= 2020 Icelandic Women's Football Cup =

Mjólkurbirkarinn kvenna

Tournament details
- Country: Iceland
- Dates: 6 June 2020 – 17 October 2020
- Teams: 29

Tournament statistics
- Matches played: 25
- Goals scored: 103 (4.12 per match)
- All statistics correct as of 8 September 2020.

The 2020 Icelandic Women's Cup also known as the Mjólkurbirkarinn kvenna is the 40th edition of Icelandic national cup. Selfoss were the defending champions after defeating KR at the last tournament's final.

== Calendar ==
Below are the dates for each round as given by the official schedule:

Round	Main date	Number of fixtures	Clubs
First Round	6–8 June 2020	7	14 → 7
Second Round	13–14 June 2020	6	12 → 6
Third Round	10–11 July 2020	8	16 → 8
Quarter-finals	3 September 2020 (originally 11–12 August)	4	8 → 4
Semi-finals	1 November 2020 (originally 9 September)	2	4 → 2
Final	6 November 2020 (originally 31 October)	1	2 → 1 at Laugardalsvöllur

== First round ==
14 teams began the cup in the first round, with 8 teams coming from the 2. deild kvenna (second division) and 6 teams from the 1. deild kvenna (first division)

Team 1	Score	Team 2
6 June 2020
Fjarðab/Höttur/Leiknir	1–1 (a.e.t.) (2–0 p)	Hamrarnir
Hamar	0–8	ÍA
ÍR	2–1 (a.e.t.)	Álftanes
7 June 2020
Afturelding	3–0	HK
Fjölnir	0–5	Augnablik
Fram	0–5	Grindavík
Grótta	3–5	Víkingur Reykjavík

6 June 2020	Fjarðab/Höttur/Leiknir	1–1 (a.e.t.) (2–0 p)	Hamrarnir	Fjarðabyggðarhöllin, Reyðarfjörður
16:00	Barbara Kopácsi 8'	ksi.is	Adalsteinsdottir 76'	Attendance: 0 Referee: Antoníus Bjarki Halldórsson

6 June 2020	Hamar	0–8	ÍA	Grýluvöllur, Hveragerði
14:00		ksi.is	Jóhannesdóttir 1', 31'; Hallórsdóttir 3'; Reynisdóttir 35'; Thórdardóttir 63', 65'; Ashley Poucel 76'; Thórsteinsdóttir 90+3'	Attendance: 0 Referee: Tómas Wolfgang Meyer

6 June 2020	ÍR	2–1 (a.e.t.)	Álftanes	Hertz völlurinn, Reykjavík
13:00	Einarsdóttir 51'; Bucko 108'	ksi.is	Sigurdardóttir 50'	Attendance: 0 Referee: Jóhann Atli Hafliðason

7 June 2020	Afturelding	3–0	HK	Fagverksvöllurinn Varmá, Mosfellsbær
19:15	Gudmundsdóttir 25'; Ólafsdóttir 80'	ksi.is		Attendance: 0 Referee: Patryk Emanuel Jurczak

7 June 2020	Fjölnir	0–5	Augnablik	Extra völlurinn, Reykjavík
19:15		ksi.is	Sigurdardóttir 6'; Bjarmadóttir 8'; Thorhallsdóttir 45'; Kristjansdóttir 78'; Jonasdóttir 80'	Referee: Óli Njáll Ingólfsson

7 June 2020	Fram	0–5	Grindavík	Framvöllur, Reykjavík
20:00		ksi.is	Hallgrímsdóttir 34', 36', 73 (pen.)', 75', 90+2'	Attendance: 0 Referee: Ásmundur Hrafn Magnússon

7 June 2020	Grótta	3–5 (a.e.t.)	Víkingur Reykjavík	Vivaldivöllurinn, Seltjarnarnes
19:15	Jónasdóttir 3', 48'; Sigurdardóttir 11'	ksi.is	Atladóttir 36', 90+2'; Björnsdóttir 40'; Ómarsdóttir 99'; Kristjánsdóttir 106'	Attendance: 0 Referee: Guðmundur Páll Friðbertsson

== Second round ==
The second round will be played on 13 June 2020 and 14 June 2020. 12 teams will complete, seven winners from the first round, one team from the 2. deild kvenna and four teams from the 1. deild kvenna.

Team 1	Score	Team 2
13 June 2020
Fjarðab/Höttur/Leiknir	5–0	UMF Sindri
ÍR	0–7	ÍA
Tindastóll	4–1	Völsungur
14 June 2020
Augnablik	5–0	Grindavík
Haukar	2–2 (a.e.t.) (3–2 p)	Víkingur Reykjavík
Keflavík IF	2–0	Afturelding

13 June 2020	Fjarðab/Höttur/Leiknir	5–0	UMF Sindri	Fjarðabyggðarhöllin, Reyðarfjörður
17:00	Gunnlaugsdóttir 51'; Thórvaldsdóttir 58'; Mesetovic 60', 75'; Barbara Kopácsi 78'	ksi.is		Attendance: 0 Referee: Vignir Freyr Magnússon

13 June 2020	ÍR	0–7	ÍA	Hertz völlurinn, Reykjavík
14:00		ksi.is	Ashley Poucel 5', 43'; Jóhannesdóttir 12', 46'; Halldórsdóttir 38', 60'; Haraldsdottir 51'	Attendance: 0 Referee: Bríet Bragadóttir

13 June 2020	Tindastóll	4–1	Völsungur	Sauðárkróksvöllur, Sauðárkrók
14:00	Pálsdóttir 7', 28', 52'; Sigmarsdóttir 33'	ksi.is	Brynjarsdóttir 82'	Attendance: 0 Referee: Patrik Freyr Guðmundsson

14 June 2020	Augnablik	5–0	Grindavík	Kópavogsvöllur, Kópavogur
13:00	Helgadóttir 8', 85'; Bjarmadóttir 48', 52'; Kristjánsdóttir 56'	ksi.is		Attendance: 0 Referee: Steinar Stephensen

14 June 2020	Haukar	2–2 (a.e.t.) (3–2 p)	Víkingur Reykjavík	Gaman Ferða völlurinn, Hafnarfjörður
13:00	Björnsdóttir 20'; Behnke 67'	ksi.is	Atladóttir 19'; V. Björnsdóttir 37'	Attendance: 0 Referee: Patryk Emanuel Jurczak

14 June 2020	Keflavík IF	2–0	Afturelding	Nettóvöllurinn, Keflavík
14:00	Einarsdóttir 24'; Gudmundsdóttir 50'	ksi.is		Attendance: 0 Referee: Guðmundur Ingi Bjarnason

== Third round ==
The third round will be played on 10 July 2020 and 11 July 2020 and will consist of 16 teams. The six winners of the second round and the ten Úrvalsdeild teams entered this round.

Team 1	Score	Team 2
10 July 2020
Valur	3–1	ÍBV
Stjarnan	0–3	Selfoss
KR	4–1	Tindastóll
Þróttur	0–1	FH
Fylkir	0–1	Breiðablik
Haukar	7–1	Fjarðab/Höttur/Leiknir
11 July 2020
Þór/KA	1–0	Keflavík IF
ÍA	2–1	Augnablik

10 July 2020	Valur	3–1	ÍBV	Origovöllurin, Reykjavík
18:00	Elín Metta Jensen 5', 8'; Hermansdóttir 10'	ksi.is	Einarsdóttir 90+3'	Attendance: 0 Referee: Guðmundur Valgeirsson

10 July 2020	Stjarnan	0–3	Selfoss	Samsung Völlurinn, (Garðabær, Reykjavík)
19:15		ksi.is	Magnúsdóttir 42', 51'; Brynjarsdóttir 78'	Attendance: 0 Referee: Kristinn Fidrik Hrafnsson

10 July 2020	KR	4–1	Tindastóll	KR-völlur, Reykjavík
19:15	Hermannsdóttir 52', 65'; Ásbjörnsdóttir 58', 70'	ksi.is	Halldórsdóttir 37'	Attendance: 0 Referee: Magnus Gardarsson

10 July 2020	Þróttur	0–1	FH	Eimskipsvöllurinn, Reykjavík
19:15		ksi.is	A. Pálsdóttir 16'	Attendance: 0 Referee: Asmundur Thun Sveinsson

10 July 2020	Fylkir	0–1	Breiðablik	Würth völlurin, Reykjavík
20:00		ksi.is	Albertsdóttir 9'	Attendance: 0 Referee: Briet Bragadóttir

10 July 2020	Haukar	7–1	Fjarðab/Höttur/Leiknir	Gaman Ferða völlurinn, Hafnarfjörður
20:15	Eiríksdóttir 5', 57'I; Björnsdóttir 43', 78'; Guðmundsdóttir 60'; Símonardóttir 75'; Þorkelsdóttir 88'	ksi.is	Þorvarðardóttir 59'	Attendance: 0 Referee: Sveinn Thor Thorvaldsson

11 July 2020	Þór/KA	1–0	Keflavík IF	Þórsvöllur, Akureyri
16:00	Aðalsteinsdóttir 13'	ksi.is		Attendance: 0 Referee: Arna Ingi Ingvarsson

11 July 2020	ÍA	2–1	Augnablik	Norðurálsvöllurinn, Akranes
16:15	Jóhannesdóttir 27'; Jónsdóttir 90+2'	ksi.is	Bjarmadóttir 74'	Attendance: 0 Referee: Gudhmundur Ingi Bjarnason

== Quarter-finals ==
The quarter-final matches were originally scheduled to be played on 11 & 12 August 2020 but were later moved to 3 September 2020.

Team 1	Score	Team 2
Selfoss	1–0	Valur
ÍA	0–5	Breiðablik
Þór/KA	3–1	Haukar
FH	1–2	KR

3 September 2020	Selfoss	1–0	Valur	JÁVERK-völlurinn, Selfoss
17:00	Magnúsdóttir 75'	ksi.is		Attendance: 0 Referee: Jóhann Ingi Jónsson

3 September 2020	Þór/KA	3–1	Haukar	Boginn, Akureyri
17:00	Ásgrímsdóttir 68'; Baldursdóttir 78'; Ingvarsdóttir 90+4'	ksi.is	Behnke 57'	Attendance: 0 Referee: Sveinn Arnasson

3 September 2020	FH	1–2	KR	Kaplakriki, Hafnarfjörður
17:00	Beard 52' (o.g.)	ksi.is	Ómarsdóttir 24'; K. Ásbjörnsdóttir 80'	Attendance: 0 Referee: Briet Bragadóttir

3 September 2020	ÍA	0–5	Breiðablik	Akraneshöllin, Akranes
19:00		ksi.is	Jónsdóttir 11'; Hönnudóttir 22'; Albertsdóttir 23', 38'; V. Friðriksdóttir 47'	Attendance: 0 Referee: Ásmundur Þór Sveinsson

== Semi-finals ==
Matches will be played on 1 November 2020

Team 1	Score	Team 2
TBD	–	TBD
TBD	–	TBD

1 November 2020	TBD	v	TBD	TBD
14:00				Attendance: 0

1 November 2020	TBD	v	TBD	TBD
14:00				Attendance: 0

== Final ==
Match will be played on 6 November 2020 at the Laugardalsvöllur

Team 1	Score	Team 2
TBD	–	TBD

6 November 2020	TBD	v	TBD	Laugardalsvöllur
19:15				Attendance: 0

Note:- Due to the COVID-19 pandemic, spectators were not allowed into stadiums.

== Topscorers ==
As of matches played on 3 September 2020.

Rank	Player	Club	Goals
1	(Iceland) Birgitta Hallgrímsdóttir	Keflavík IF	5
1	(Iceland) Erla Karitas Jóhannesdóttir	ÍA	5
3	(Iceland) Björk Bjarmadóttir	Augnablik	4
4	(Iceland) Agla María Albertsdóttir	Breiðablik	3
4	(Iceland) Hólmfríður Magnúsdóttir	Selfoss	3
4	(Iceland) Nadia Atladóttir	Víkingur Reykjavík	3
4	(Iceland) Katrín Ásbjörnsdóttir	KR	3
4	(Iceland) Hugrún Pálsdóttir	Tindastóll	3
4	(Iceland) Saeunn Björnsdóttir	Víkingur Reykjavík	3
4	(United States) Jaclyn Ashley Poucel	ÍA	3
4	(Iceland) Fríða Halldórsdóttir	ÍA	3
