= 2019 Úrvalsdeild kvenna (football) =

Úrvalsdeild kvenna
- Season: 2019
- Dates: 2 May 2019 – 21 September 2019
- Champions: Valur
- Relegated: Keflavík and HK/Víkingur
- Matches: 90
- Goals: 310 (3.44 per match)
- Top goalscorer: Berglind Björg Þorvaldsdóttir (16); Hlín Eiríksdóttir (16); Elín Metta Jensen (16)
- All statistics correct as of 15 March 2020.

The 2019 Úrvalsdeild kvenna was the 48th season of the women's football top level league in Iceland. Breiðablik is the defending champion.

== Teams ==
The 2019 Úrvalsdeild kvenna is contested by ten teams, eight of which played in the division the previous year and two teams promoted from 1. deild kvenna. The bottom two teams from the previous season, Grindavík and FH, were relegated to the 1. deild kvenna and were replaced by Keflavík and Fylkir, champions and runners-up of the 2018 1. deild kvenna respectively.

=== Club information ===
Team	Location	Stadium	Capacity
Breiðablik	Kópavogur	Kópavogsvöllur	5,501
Fylkir	Reykjavík	Floridana völlurinn	2,872
HK/Víkingur	Kópavogur/Reykjavík	Kórinn/Víkingsvöllur	2,000/1,449
ÍBV	Vestmannaeyjar	Hásteinsvöllur	3,034
Keflavík	Keflavík	Keflavíkurvöllur	4,957
KR	Reykjavík	Alvogenvöllurinn	3,333
Selfoss	Selfoss	Selfossvöllur	950
Stjarnan	Garðabær	Samsung völlurinn	2,300
Valur	Reykjavík	Valsvöllur	2,465
Þór/KA	Akureyri	Þórsvöllur	1,550

Source: Scoresway

== League table ==
Pos	Team	Pld	W	D	L	GF	GA	GD	Pts	Qualification or relegation
1	Valur	18	16	2	0	65	12	+53	50	2020–21 UEFA Women's Champions League
2	Breiðablik	18	15	3	0	54	15	+39	48	
3	Selfoss	18	11	1	6	24	17	+7	34	
4	Þór/KA	18	8	4	6	29	27	+2	28	
5	Stjarnan	18	7	2	9	21	32	−11	23	
6	Fylkir	18	7	1	10	22	39	−17	22	
7	KR	18	6	1	11	24	35	−11	19	
8	ÍBV	18	6	0	12	29	44	−15	18	
9	Keflavík	18	4	1	13	30	41	−11	13	Relegation to 1. deild kvenna
10	HK/Víkingur	18	2	1	15	12	48	−36	7	Relegation to 1. deild kvenna

Updated to match(es) played on 21 September 2019. Source: soccerway.com
Rules for classification: 1) Points; 2) Goal difference; 3) Number of goals scored; 4) Head-to-head points; 5) Head-to-head goal difference; 6) Head-to-head away goals scored

== Top goalscorers ==
As of matches played on 21 September 2019.

Rank	Player	Club	Goals
1	(Iceland) Berglind Björg Þorvaldsdóttir	Breiðablik	16
1	(Iceland) Hlín Eiríksdóttir	Valur	16
1	(Iceland) Elín Metta Jensen	Valur	16
4	(Iceland) Margrét Lára Viðarsdóttir	Valur	15
5	(Iceland) Agla María Albertsdóttir	Breiðablik	12
6	(Canada) Cloé Lacasse	ÍBV	11
6	(Mexico) Sandra Stephany Mayor	Þór/KA	11
6	(United States) Sophie McMahon Groff	Keflavík	11
6	(Iceland) Alexandra Jóhannsdóttir	Breiðablik	11
10	(Iceland) Hólmfríður Magnúsdóttir	Selfoss	7
10	(Iceland) Sveindís Jane Jónsdóttir	Keflavík	7
10	(Iceland) Ída Marín Hermannsdóttir	Fylkir	7
10	(Iceland) Fanndís Friðriksdóttir	Valur	7
