= 2017 Úrvalsdeild kvenna (football) =

Úrvalsdeild kvenna
- Season: 2017
- Champions: Þór/KA
- Relegated: Fylkir; Haukar
- Champions League: Þór/KA
- Matches: 90
- Goals: 284 (3.16 per match)
- Top goalscorer: Sandra Stephany Mayor (19 goals)
- Biggest home win: Valur 8–0 Haukar (6 September 2017)
- Biggest away win: Fylkir 0–5 ÍBV (16 June 2017); KR 0–5 Valur (20 June 2017); Grindavík 0–5 Breiðablik (20 June 2017); FH 0–5 Breiðablik (27 June 2017)
- Highest scoring: Breiðablik 7–2 Haukar (23 August 2017)
- All statistics correct as of 29 September 2017.

The 2017 Úrvalsdeild kvenna was the 46th season of the women's football top level league in Iceland. Stjarnan was the defending champion. The season began on 27 April and concluded on 29 September. Þór/KA were crowned champions.

== Teams ==
Locations of the 2017 Úrvalsdeild teams

The 2017 Úrvalsdeild kvenna was contested by ten teams, eight of which played in the division the previous year and two teams promoted from 1. deild kvenna. The bottom two teams from the previous season, Selfoss and ÍA Akranes, were relegated to the 2017 1. deild kvenna and were replaced by Grindavík and Haukar, champions and runners-up of the 2016 1. deild kvenna respectively.

=== Club information ===
| Team | Location | Stadium | Capacity |
|---|---|---|---|
| Breiðablik | Kópavogur | Kópavogsvöllur | 5,501 |
| FH | Hafnarfjörður | Kaplakrikavöllur | 6,738 |
| Fylkir | Reykjavík | Floridana völlurinn | 2,872 |
| Grindavík | Grindavík | Grindavíkurvöllur | 1,750 |
| Haukar | Hafnarfjörður | Ásvellir | 2,120 |
| ÍBV | Vestmannaeyjar | Hásteinsvöllur | 3,034 |
| KR | Reykjavík | Alvogenvöllurinn | 3,333 |
| Stjarnan | Garðabær | Samsung völlurinn | 2,300 |
| Valur | Reykjavík | Valsvöllur | 2,465 |
| Þór/KA | Akureyri | Þórsvöllur | 1,550 |

Source: Scoresway

== League table ==
| Pos | Team | Pld | W | D | L | GF | GA | GD | Pts | Qualification or relegation |
|---|---|---|---|---|---|---|---|---|---|---|
| 1 | Þór/KA (C) | 18 | 14 | 2 | 2 | 44 | 15 | +29 | 44 | 2018–19 UEFA Women's Champions League |
| 2 | Breiðablik | 18 | 14 | 0 | 4 | 47 | 10 | +37 | 42 | |
| 3 | Valur | 18 | 12 | 1 | 5 | 48 | 18 | +30 | 37 | |
| 4 | Stjarnan | 18 | 10 | 3 | 5 | 36 | 19 | +17 | 33 | |
| 5 | ÍBV | 18 | 9 | 6 | 3 | 33 | 21 | +12 | 33 | |
| 6 | FH | 18 | 7 | 2 | 9 | 17 | 24 | −7 | 23 | |
| 7 | Grindavík | 18 | 5 | 3 | 10 | 16 | 44 | −28 | 18 | |
| 8 | KR | 18 | 5 | 0 | 13 | 15 | 41 | −26 | 15 | |
| 9 | Fylkir (R) | 18 | 2 | 3 | 13 | 13 | 36 | −23 | 9 | Relegation to 1. deild kvenna |
| 10 | Haukar (R) | 18 | 1 | 2 | 15 | 15 | 56 | −41 | 5 | Relegation to 1. deild kvenna |

Updated to match(es) played on 29 September 2017. Source: soccerway.com
Rules for classification: 1) Points; 2) Goal difference; 3) Number of goals scored; 4) Head-to-head points; 5) Head-to-head goal difference; 6) Head-to-head away goals scored
(C) Champions; (R) Relegated

== Results ==
Each team will play home and away once against every other team for a total of 18 games played each.

| Home \ Away | BRE | FH | FYL | GRI | HAU | ÍBV | KR | STJ | VAL | THO |
|---|---|---|---|---|---|---|---|---|---|---|
| Breiðablik | — | 1–0 | 2–0 | 4–0 | 7–2 | 3–0 | 6–0 | 1–0 | 3–0 | 1–2 |
| FH | 0–5 | — | 2–0 | 0–0 | 1–0 | 1–1 | 2–1 | 1–3 | 2–0 | 0–1 |
| Fylkir | 0–2 | 0–1 | — | 1–0 | 1–1 | 0–5 | 1–3 | 0–1 | 0–2 | 1–4 |
| Grindavík | 0–5 | 1–3 | 2–1 | — | 2–1 | 0–4 | 1–3 | 0–0 | 0–3 | 3–2 |
| Haukar | 1–3 | 0–3 | 1–2 | 1–2 | — | 2–2 | 0–2 | 1–5 | 1–4 | 1–4 |
| ÍBV | 2–0 | 1–0 | 0–0 | 2–2 | 3–0 | — | 1–0 | 1–1 | 3–1 | 3–2 |
| KR | 0–2 | 2–1 | 3–1 | 0–1 | 0–3 | 0–2 | — | 1–5 | 0–5 | 0–2 |
| Stjarnan | 0–2 | 2–0 | 1–0 | 4–1 | 5–0 | 2–2 | 2–0 | — | 1–2 | 1–3 |
| Valur | 2–0 | 4–0 | 3–2 | 5–1 | 8–0 | 4–0 | 3–0 | 1–3 | — | 1–1 |
| Þór/KA | 1–0 | 2–0 | 3–3 | 5–0 | 2–0 | 3–1 | 3–0 | 3–0 | 1–0 | — |

Updated to match(es) played on 29 September 2017. Source: KSÍ (Football Association of Iceland) (in Icelandic)
Legend: Blue = home team win; Yellow = draw; Red = away team win.

== Top goalscorers ==
As of matches played on 29 September 2017.

| Rank | Player | Club | Goals |
|---|---|---|---|
| 1 | (Mexico) Sandra Stephany Mayor | Þór/KA | 19 |
| 2 | (Iceland) Elín Metta Jensen | Valur | 16 |
| 3 | (Iceland) Berglind Björg Þorvaldsdóttir | Breiðablik | 15 |
| 4 | (Canada) Cloé Lacasse | ÍBV | 13 |
| 4 | (Iceland) Katrín Ásbjörnsdóttir | Stjarnan | 13 |
| 6 | (Iceland) Fanndís Friðriksdóttir | Breiðablik | 10 |
| 7 | (Iceland) Rakel Hönnudóttir | Breiðablik | 9 |
| 8 | (Iceland) Sandra María Jessen | Þór/KA | 8 |
| 8 | (Iceland) Kristín Erna Sigurlásdóttir | ÍBV | 8 |
| 10 | (Serbia) Vesna Elísa Smiljkovic | Valur | 7 |
| 10 | (Iceland) Hulda Ósk Jónsdóttir | Þór/KA | 7 |
| 10 | (United States) Marjani Hing-Glover | Haukar | 7 |
| 10 | (Mexico) Ariana Calderón | Valur | 7 |
