= 2020 Úrvalsdeild kvenna (football) =

Úrvalsdeild kvenna
- Season: 2020
- Dates: 12 June 2020 – 4 October 2020
- Champions: Breiðablik
- Relegated: FH; KR Reykjavík
- UEFA Champions League: Breiðablik; Valur
- Matches: 78
- Goals: 278 (3.56 per match)
- Top goalscorer: Agla María Albertsdóttir (14); Sveindís Jane Jónsdóttir (14)
- Biggest home win: Breiðablik 8–0 ÍBV (27 September 2020)
- Biggest away win: Fylkir 0–7 Valur (26 September 2020) Þór/KA 0–7 Breiðablik (13 September 2020) FH 0–7 Breiðablik (16 August 2020)
- Highest scoring: Stjarnan 5–5 Þróttur (28 July 2020)
- All statistics correct as of 30 October 2020.

The 2020 Úrvalsdeild kvenna was the 49th season of the women's association football highest division league in Iceland.Due to the effects of the COVID-19 pandemic the season started late on 12 June 2020. Valur were the defending champions after claiming the 2019 championship.

On 30 October 2020, due to the COVID-19 pandemic, the season was abandoned with just two rounds of matches left to be played. Breiðablik were declared champions, claiming their 18th Úrvalsdeild championship. The top two teams of the league at the time of the abandonment based on the average number of points per game played, Breiðablik and Valur, were selected to play in the 2021–22 UEFA Women's Champions League by the Football Association of Iceland, likewise the last two teams relegating to the 1.deild kvenna.

== Teams ==
The 2020 Úrvalsdeild kvenna was contested by 10 teams, eight of which played in the division the previous season and two promoted from the 2019 1. deild kvenna. The bottom two teams from the previous season, Keflavík and HK/Vikingur were relegated to the 1. deild kvenna and were replaced by Þróttur and FH, the winner and runners-up of the 2019 1. deild kvenna respectively.

Team	Location	Stadium	Capacity
Breiðablik	Kópavogur	Kópavogsvöllur	5,501
FH	Hafnarfjörður	Kaplakrikavöllur	6,738
Fylkir	Reykjavík	Floridana Völlurinn	1,800
ÍBV	Vestmannaeyjar	Hásteinsvöllur	3,034
KR Reykjavík	Reykjavík	Alvogenvöllurinn	3,333
Selfoss	Selfoss	Selfossvöllur	950
Stjarnan	Garðabær	Samsung völlurinn	2,300
Þróttur	Reykjavík	Valbjarnarvöllur	5,478
Valur	Reykjavík	Valsvöllur	2,465
Þór/KA	Akureyri	Þórsvöllur	1,550

Source: Scoresway

== League table ==
Pos	Team	Pld	W	D	L	GF	GA	GD	Pts	PPG	Qualification or relegation
1	Breiðablik (C)	15	14	0	1	66	3	+63	42	2.80	Qualification for the Champions League first round
2	Valur	16	13	1	2	43	11	+32	40	2.50	Qualification for the Champions League first round
3	Fylkir	15	5	6	4	22	29	−7	21	1.40	
4	Selfoss	16	7	1	8	24	20	+4	22	1.38	
5	Þróttur	16	4	6	6	28	34	−6	18	1.13	
6	Stjarnan	16	5	3	8	25	34	−9	18	1.13	
7	Þór/KA	16	5	3	8	20	37	−17	18	1.13	
8	ÍBV	16	5	2	9	16	39	−23	17	1.06	
9	FH (R)	16	5	1	10	19	35	−16	16	1.00	Relegation to 1. deild kvenna
10	KR Reykjavík (R)	14	3	1	10	15	36	−21	10	0.71	Relegation to 1. deild kvenna

Source: Soccerway
Rules for classification: 1) Points; 2) Goal difference; 3) Number of goals scored; 4) Head-to-head points; 5) Head-to-head goal difference; 6) Head-to-head away goals scored
(C) Champions; (R) Relegated

== Results ==
Home \ Away	THO	BRE	VAL	ÍBV	FYL	THR	SEL	STA	FH	KR
Þór/KA	—	0–7	0–2	4–0	2–2	—	1–0	4–1	0–1	2–1
Breiðablik	7–0	—	4–0	8–0	—	5–0	1–2	3–1	3–0	6–0
Valur	6–0	0–1	—	4–0	1–1	3–1	—	3–0	3–1	3–0
ÍBV	1–0	0–4	1–3	—	2–2	4–3	3–2	0–1	1–3	—
Fylkir	4–2	0–4	0–7	1–1	—	2–2	1–0	2–1	—	—
Þróttur	1–1	0–4	1–2	0–2	2–1	—	0–0	—	2–2	5–0
Selfoss	2–1	0–2	1–2	—	0–1	1–3	—	2–3	1–0	2–1
Stjarnan	1–1	—	0–3	1–0	1–1	5–5	1–4	—	3–0	2–3
FH	1–2	0–7	—	0–1	3–1	1–2	0–2	3–2	—	4–2
KR	—	—	0–1	3–0	1–3	1–1	0–5	0–2	3–0	—

Source: Soccerway
Legend: Blue = home team win; Yellow = draw; Red = away team win.

== Top goalscorers ==
As of matches played on 4 October 2020.

Rank	Player	Club	Goals
1	(Iceland) Agla María Albertsdóttir	Breiðablik	14
1	(Iceland) Sveindís Jane Jónsdóttir	Breiðablik	14
3	(Iceland) Elín Metta Jensen	Valur	13
4	(Iceland) Berglind Björg Þorvaldsdóttir	Breiðablik	12
5	(Iceland) Hlín Eiríksdóttir	Valur	11
6	(Iceland) Alexandra Jóhannsdóttir	Breiðablik	10
6	(Iceland) Bryndís Arna Níelsdóttir	Fylkir	10
6	(United States) Stephanie Mariana Ribeiro	Þróttur	10
9	(United States) Tiffany McCarty	Selfoss	9
