= Fatma Kara =

Turkish women's football midfielder (born 1991)

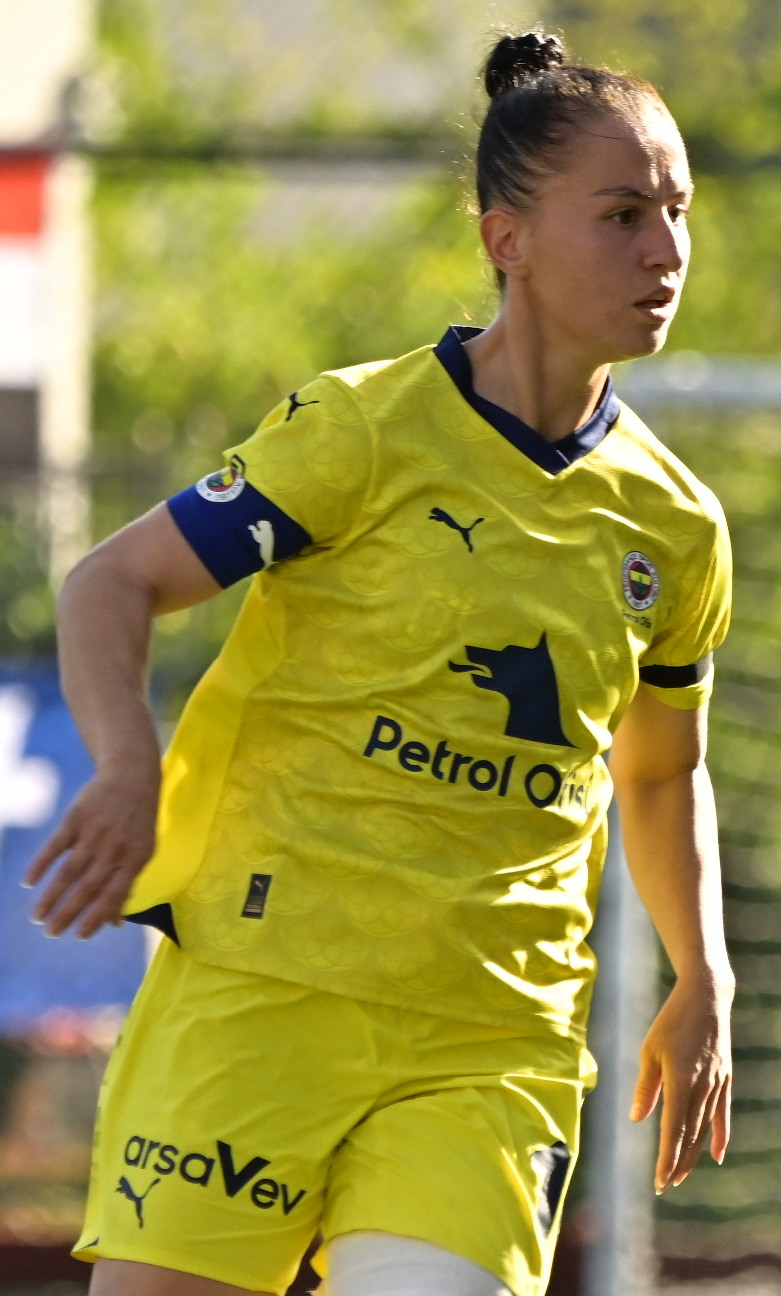
- Fatma Kara for Fenerbahçe (October 2023)

Personal information
- Full name: Fatma Kara Gültekin
- Birth name: Fatma Kara
- Date of birth: 15 June 1991 (age 35)
- Place of birth: Herten, Recklinghausen, NRW, Germany
- Position: Midfielder

Team information
- Current team: Trabzon
- Number: 28

Senior career*
Years	Team	Apps	(Gls)
2007–2009	1. FFC Recklinghausen	11	(5)
2009	SG Lütgendortmund	12	(5)
2010	TuS Harpen	7	(0)
2010–2011	Trabzonspor	22	(9)
2011–2014	Trabzon İdmanocağı	48	(10)
2014–2017	Ataşehir	63	(28)
2017–2018	Beşiktaş	17	(5)
2018–2019	HK/Víkingur	34	(3)
2020	ÍBV	16	(2)
2021	1. FFC Recklinghausen	2	(0)
2021–2024	Fenerbahçe	67	(14)
2024–2025	Beylerbeyi	21	(1)
2025–	Trabzon	3	(1)

International career^{‡}
2007	Turkey U-17	10	(0)
2007–2010	Turkey U-19	32	(18)
2009–2020	Turkey	45	(5)
- * Club domestic league appearances and goals as of 5 October 2025 ‡ National team caps and goals as of 18 September 2020

Fatma Kara Gültekin (born Fatma Kara; 15 June 1991) is a Turkish women's football midfielder, who plays in Turkish Women's Football Super League for Trabzon. She was a member of the Turkish national team.

== Early life ==
Fatma Kara was born in Herten district of Recklinghausen in North Rhine-Westphalia, Germany on June 15, 1991. Her father Hasan Kara is a Turkish immigrant. Her parents, initially, did not allow her to play football. The father of her German schoolmate, however, succeeded to convince the parents. At the age of nine, Kara entered the local football club JK SpVgg. Herten.

Her three-year younger sister Ayşe Kara is also a footballer, who follows her footsteps.

== Club career ==
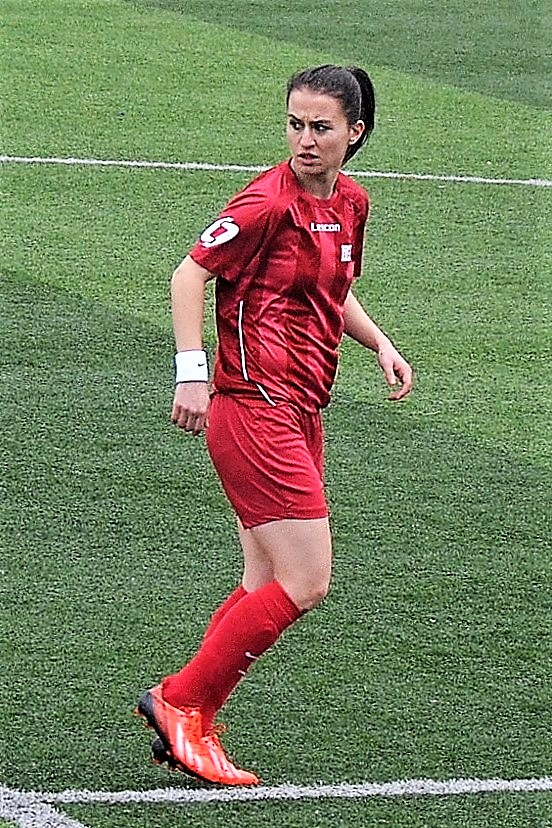
Fatma Kara for Ataşehir Belediyespor (March 2014)

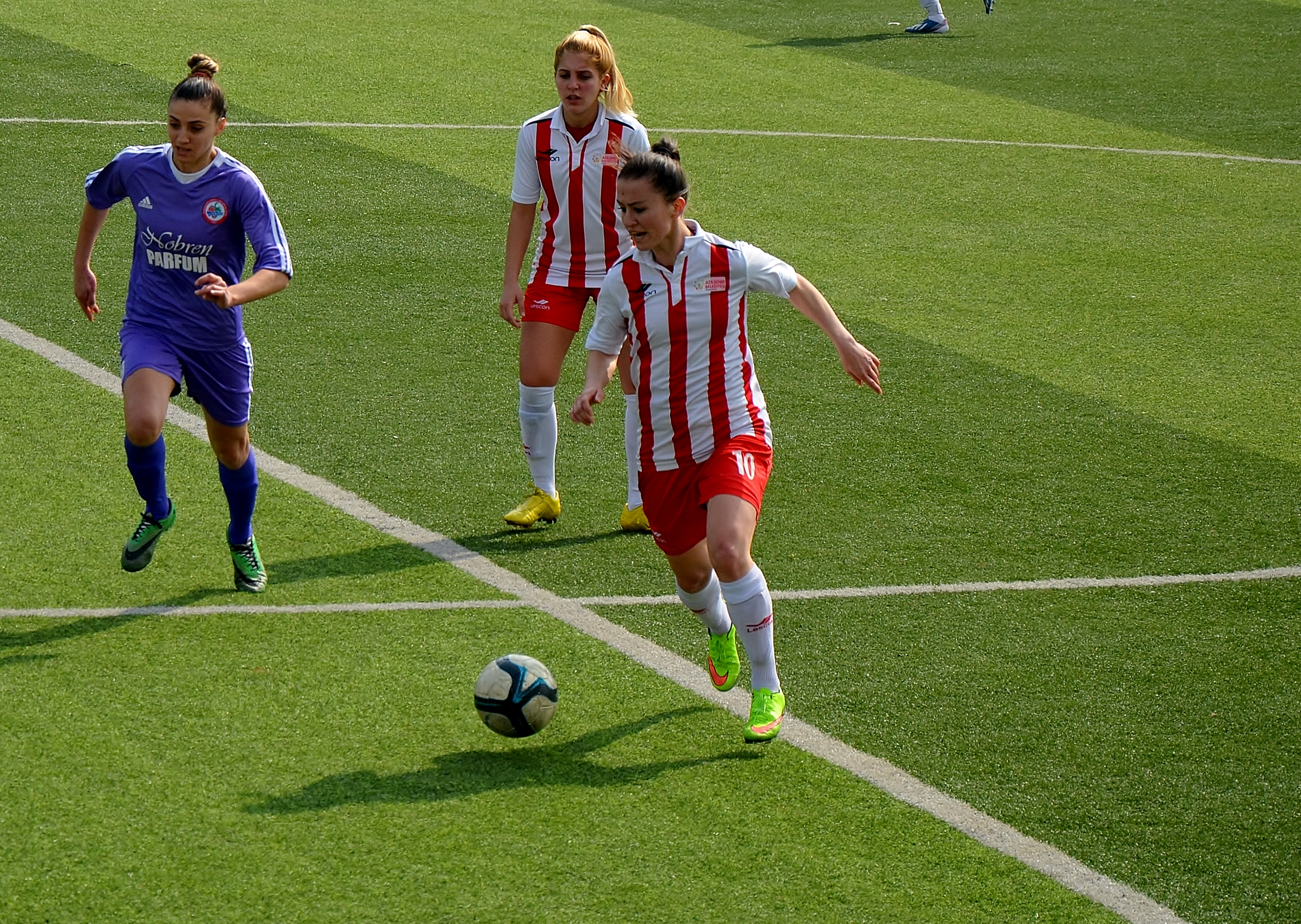
Fatma Kara(white/red) driving the ball for Ataşehir Belediyespor in the 2014–15 season's home match against Kdz. Ereğlispor.

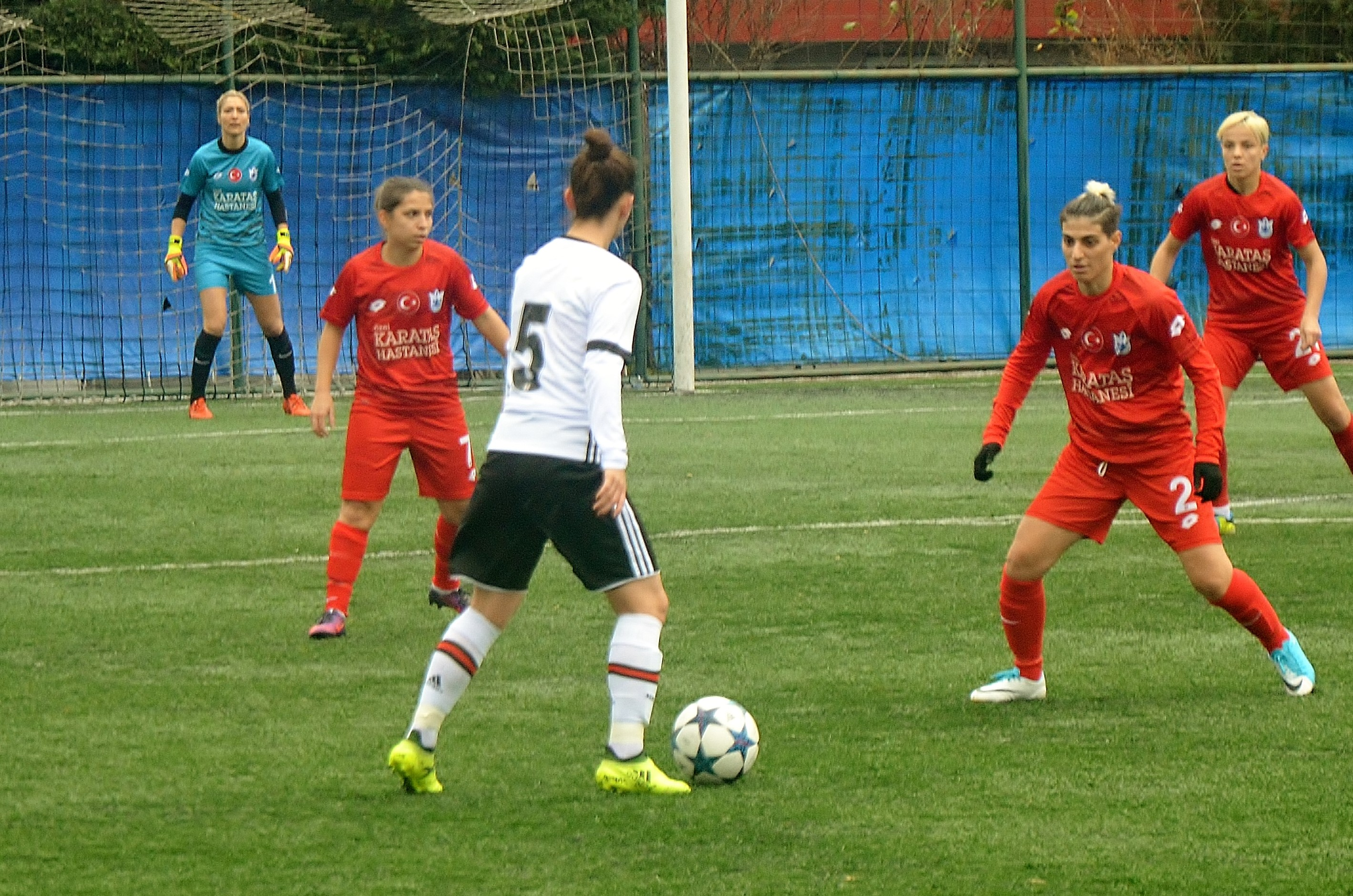
Fatma Kara (#5) attacking Konak Belediyespor for Beşiktaş J.K. in the 2017–18 season home match.

Fatma Kara played in Germany for the hometown club 1. FFC Recklinghausen in the German Regionalliga West. In the 2008–09 season, she moved to SG Lütgend Dortmund upon an offer to accomplish her high school education there. The next season, she joined TuS Harpen.

After her graduation, she moved to Turkey, and signed for Trabzonspor. She scored nine goals in 22 matches she appeared with Trabzonspor. After playing one season, the women's side of the club dissolved, and she transferred to the rival club Trabzon İdmanocağı in the 2010–11 season. In the two seasons with Trabzon İdmanocağı, Kara netted 10 goals in 40 appearances.

On January 10, 2014, Kara was transferred by the Istanbul-based club Ataşehir Belediyespor.

After four seasons by Ataşehir Belediyespor, she transferred to Beşiktaş J.K. in the 2017–18 season.

In May 2018, Kara signed with the Reykjavík-based club HK/Víkingur of the Icelandic women's league Úrvalsdeild kvenna. She scored two goals in 17 matches of the 2018 season for her team. In November 2019, Kara signed with ÍBV. After one season in Vestmannaeyjar, Kara returned to her initial club 1. FFC Recklinghausen 2003 in the German Frauen-Regionalliga West, for which she had played until 2009.

Mid November 2021, she returned to Turkey, and joined the newly re-established and in the Super League entered club Fenerbahçe. After scoring 14 goals in 67 matches in three seasons, she transferred in the 2024–25 Super League season to Beylerbeyi.

In August 2025, she transferred once again to her former club Trabzon.

== Internationa career ==
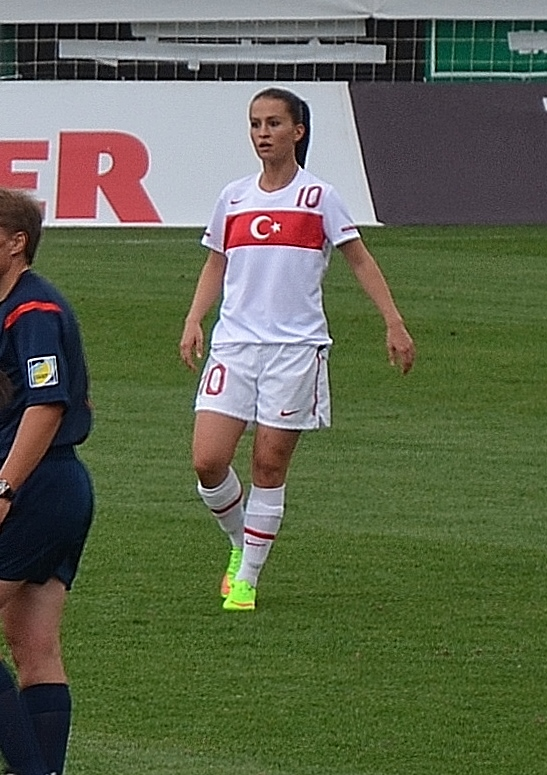
Fatma Kara for Turkey women's national team in the 2015 FIFA Women's World Cup qualification – UEFA Group 6 match against Belarus.

In 2007 still living in Germany, she was called up for the Turkey girls' U-17 national team, and made her debut in the friendly match against the Azeri team on May 27. Until October 2007, she capped ten times in the youth national team, and participated also at the 2008 UEFA Women's U-17 Championship qualification round matches.

Fatma Kara debuted in the Turkey U-19 national team in the friendly match against Maceonian juniors on September 16, 2007. She capped 32 times until April 2010, and played in the 2008, 2009 and 2010 qualification matches of UEFA Women's Under-19 Championship.

Kara appeared for the first time in the women's national team playing against Azerbaijan team in the UEFA Support International Tournament on May 11, 2009. She also took part in the 2011 FIFA Women's World Cup qualification – UEFA Group 5 and UEFA Women's Euro 2013 qualifying – Group 2 matches. As of end September 2014, she capped 25 times in the national team scoring 4 goals.

== International goals ==
No.	Date	Venue	Opponent	Score	Result	Competition
1.	13 May 2009	Poladi Stadium, Rustavi, Georgia	Georgia	0–4	0–4	UEFA Women's Support International Tournament
2.	7 May 2014	Spartak Stadium, Mogilev, Belarus	Belarus	1–2	1–2	2015 FIFA Women's World Cup qualification
3.	19 June 2014	Stadion pod Malim brdom, Petrovac, Montenegro	Montenegro	2–3	2–3	2015 FIFA Women's World Cup qualification
4.	17 September 2014	Minareliçavuş Spor Tesisleri, Bursa, Turkey	Belarus	1–0	3–0	2015 FIFA Women's World Cup qualification
5.	8 October 2019	Kocaeli Stadium, İzmit, Turkey	Slovenia	1–6	1–6	UEFA Women's Euro 2022 qualifying

== Career statistics ==
As of 22 September 2024

Club	Season	League			Continental		National		Total	
Club	Season	Division	Apps	Goals	Apps	Goals	Apps	Goals	Apps	Goals
1. FFC Recklinghausen	2007–09	Verbandsliga Westfalen	11	5	–	–	32	13	43	18
SG Lütgendortmund	2009–10	Frauen-Regionalliga	12	5	–	–	5	4	17	9
TuS Harpen	2009–10	Frauen-Regionalliga	7	0	–	–	15	2	22	2
Trabzon	2010–11	First League	22	9	–	–	8	0	30	9
Trabzon İdmanocağı	2011–12	First League	22	6	–	–	0	0	22	6
Trabzon İdmanocağı	2012–13	First League	18	4	–	–	0	0	18	4
Trabzon İdmanocağı	2013–14	First League	8	0	–	–	0	0	8	0
Trabzon İdmanocağı	Total		48	10	–	–	0	0	48	10
Ataşehir Belediyespor	2013–14	First League	9	12	–	–	6	3	15	15
Ataşehir Belediyespor	2014–15	First League	17	8	–	–	5	0	22	8
Ataşehir Belediyespor	2015–16	First League	13	4	–	–	0	0	13	4
Ataşehir Belediyespor	2016–17	First League	24	4	–	–	0	0	24	4
Ataşehir Belediyespor	Total		63	28	–	–	11	3	74	31
Beşiktaş	2017–18	First League	17	5	–	–	2	0	19	5
HK/Víkingur	2018	Úrvalsdeild kvenna	17	2	–	–	2	0	19	2
HK/Víkingur	2019	Úrvalsdeild kvenna	17	1	–	–	10	1	27	2
HK/Víkingur	Total		34	3	–	–	12	1	46	4
ÍBV	2020	Úrvalsdeild kvenna	16	2	–	–	2	0	18	2
1. FFC Recklinghausen	2020–21	Frauen-Regionalliga	2	0	–	–	0	0	2	0
Fenerbahçe	2021–22	Super League	22	9	–	–	0	0	22	9
Fenerbahçe	2022–23	Super League	16	3	–	–	0	0	16	3
Fenerbahçe	2023–24	Super League	29	2	–	–	0	0	29	2
Fenerbahçe	Total		67	14	–	–	0	0	57	14
Beylerbeyi	2024–25	Super League	21		–	–	0	0	21	1
Trabzon	2025–26	Super League	3	1	–	–	0	0	3	1
Career total			323	81	–	–	87	23	410	104

== Honors ==
Verbandsliga Westfalen

1. FFC Recklinghausen
Winners (1): 2008–09

Turkish First league

Ataşehir
Runners-up (3): 2013–14, 2014–15, 2015–16

Beşiktaş
Runners-up (1): 2017–18

Turkish Super league

Fenerbahçe
Runners-up (2): 2021–22, 2023-23
Third places (1): 2023–24
