= Karólína Lea Vilhjálmsdóttir =

Icelandic footballer

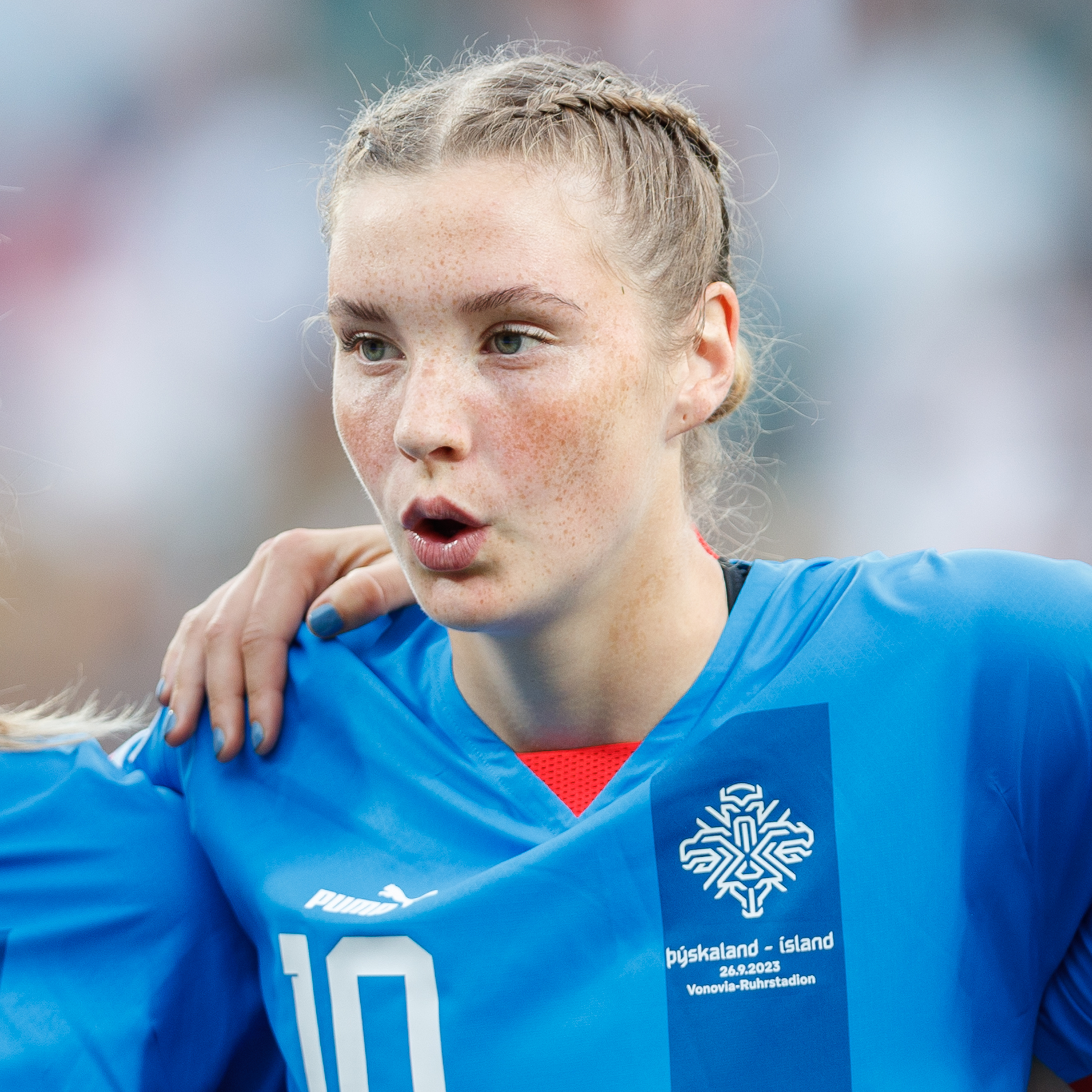
- Karólína with Iceland in 2023

Personal information
- Date of birth: 8 August 2001 (age 25)
- Place of birth: Reykjavík, Iceland
- Height: 1.77 m (5 ft 10 in)
- Position: Midfielder

Team information
- Current team: Inter Milan
- Number: 23

Senior career*
Years	Team	Apps	(Gls)
2016–2017	FH	29	(3)
2018–2020	Breiðablik	49	(8)
2021–2025	Bayern Munich	23	(0)
2021–2023	Bayern Munich II	3	(3)
2023–2025	→ Bayer Leverkusen (loan)	44	(7)
2025–	Inter Milan	22	(4)

International career^{‡}
2016–2017	Iceland U-16	11	(2)
2016–2018	Iceland U-17	15	(7)
2018–2020	Iceland U-19	22	(10)
2019–	Iceland	66	(15)
- * Club domestic league appearances and goals as of 21 November 2026 ‡ National team caps and goals as of 15 October 2026

Karólína Lea Vilhjálmsdóttir (born 8 August 2001) is an Icelandic footballer who plays as a midfielder for Inter Milan and the Iceland national team.

== Club career ==
Karólína started her senior professional career with Icelandic club FH. She then moved to Breiðablik, where she won the Besta deild kvenna (Iceland league title) and Icelandic Cup in her first year. In 2019, she won the Icelandic League Cup and Super Cup trophies and played UEFA Women's Champions League football for the first time, scoring two goals. Karólína won the league title for the second time with Breiðablik in 2020.

In January 2021, Karólína signed with Bayern Munich. In June 2021, she won the Frauen-Bundesliga with the team. It was announced on 10 February 2022 that she had extended her contract at Bayern Munich until 2025. Karólína won the Bundesliga title for the second time in the 2022-23 season.

In July 2023, she joined Bayer Leverkusen on loan in order to get more regular playing time. The 2023–24 season saw Karólína record her best Bundesliga goal tally to date of five goals. On 19 June 2024, Karólína signed another contract extension with Bayern until 2026 whilst also agreeing to have another season on loan at Leverkusen.

In July 2025, after the end of her loan at Leverkusen, Karólína left Bayern Munich and moved permanently to Serie A club Inter Milan.

== International career ==
Karólína has been capped several times for the Iceland national team. On 17 June 2019, she made her debut in a 2–0 friendly win over Finland, replacing Hlín Eiríksdóttir in the 61st-minute. Karólína scored her first goal for Iceland in a 9–0 win over Latvia on 17 September 2020.

She was part of the Iceland squad that played at the UEFA Euro 2022 in England. Iceland drew all three of their group stage games, with Karólína scoring in a 1–1 draw against Italy, but they failed to reach the knockout stage.

In February 2023, Karólína featured in all three matches for Iceland as they won the 2023 Pinatar Cup. It was the first time the nation had won the tournament.

On 13 June 2025, Karólína was called up to the Iceland squad for the UEFA Euro 2025.

== Personal life ==
Her maternal uncle, Gylfi Sigurðsson, is a professional footballer.

== Career statistics ==
=== Club ===
As of match played 19 November 2026

Appearances and goals by club, season and competition
Club	Season	League			National cup (Note: includes Icelandic Women's Football Cup, DFB-Pokal, Coppa Italia Femminile)		League cup (Note: includes Icelandic Women's Football League Cup, Serie A Women's Cup)		Continental (Note: Includes UEFA Women's Champions League)		Total	
Club	Season	Division	Apps	Goals	Apps	Goals	Apps	Goals	Apps	Goals	Apps	Goals
FH	2016	Besta deild kvenna	14	1	1	1	2	0	—		17	2
FH	2017	Besta deild kvenna	15	2	0	0	5	0	—		20	2
FH	Total		29	3	1	1	7	0	—		37	4
Breiðablik	2018	Besta deild kvenna	16	0	4	1	4	0	—		24	1
Breiðablik	2019	Besta deild kvenna	18	4	1	0	7	4	7	2	33	10
Breiðablik	2020	Besta deild kvenna	15	4	2	0	2	3	—		19	7
Breiðablik	Total		49	8	7	1	13	7	7	2	76	18
Bayern Munich II	2021–22	2. Frauen-Bundesliga	2	2	–		–		–		2	2
Bayern Munich II	2022–23	2. Frauen-Bundesliga	1	1	–		–		–		1	1
Bayern Munich II	Total		3	3	–		–		–		3	3
Bayern Munich	2020–21	Frauen-Bundesliga	6	0	0	0	—		3	1	9	1
Bayern Munich	2021–22	Frauen-Bundesliga	10	0	2	0	—		2	0	14	0
Bayern Munich	2022–23	Frauen-Bundesliga	7	0	2	0	—		2	0	11	0
Bayern Munich	Total		23	0	4	0	—		7	1	34	1
Bayer Leverkusen (loan)	2023–24	Frauen-Bundesliga	22	5	3	0	—		—		25	5
Bayer Leverkusen (loan)	2024–25	Frauen-Bundesliga	22	2	3	0	—		—		25	2
Bayer Leverkusen (loan)	Total		44	7	6	0	—		—		50	7
Inter Milan	2025–26	Serie A Femminile	16	2	4	1	2	1	7	1 (Note: Two appearances and one goal in UEFA Women's Champions League qualifying rounds and Five appearances in UEFA Women's Europa Cup)	29	5
Inter Milan	2026–27	Serie A Femminile	6	2	0	0	4	2	7	0	17	4
Inter Milan	Total		22	4	4	1	6	3	14	1	46	9
Career total			170	25	22	3	26	10	28	4	246	42

=== International ===
As of match played 13 October 2026

Appearances and goals by national team and year
National team	Year	Apps	Goals
Iceland	2019	1	0
Iceland	2020	3	1
Iceland	2021	9	4
Iceland	2022	9	3
Iceland	2023	13	1
Iceland	2024	12	1
Iceland	2025	12	5
Iceland	2026	7	0
Total		66	15

Scores and results list Iceland's goal tally first, score column indicates score after each Vilhjálmsdóttir goal.

List of international goals scored by Karólína Lea Vilhjálmsdóttir
No.	Date	Venue	Opponent	Score	Result	Competition
1	17 September 2020	Laugardalsvöllur, Reykjavík, Iceland	Latvia	9–0	9–0	UEFA Women's Euro 2022 qualifying
2	13 April 2021	Campo Enzo Bearzot, Coverciano, Italy	Italy	1–1	1–1	Friendly
3	15 June 2021	Laugardalsvöllur, Reykjavík, Iceland	Republic of Ireland	2–0	2–0	Friendly
4	26 October 2021	Laugardalsvöllur, Reykjavík, Iceland	Cyprus	3–0	5–0	2023 FIFA Women's World Cup qualification
5	30 November 2021	AEK Arena – Georgios Karapatakis, Larnaca, Cyprus	Cyprus	1–0	4–0	2023 FIFA Women's World Cup qualification
6	7 April 2022	Voždovac Stadium, Belgrade, Serbia	Belarus	4–0	5–0	2023 FIFA Women's World Cup qualification
7	7 April 2022	Voždovac Stadium, Belgrade, Serbia	Belarus	5–0	5–0	2023 FIFA Women's World Cup qualification
8	14 July 2022	Academy Stadium, Manchester, England	Italy	1–0	1–1	UEFA Women's Euro 2022
9	5 December 2023	Viborg Stadium, Viborg, Denmark	Denmark	1–0	1–0	2023–24 UEFA Women's Nations League
10	27 October 2024	Geodis Park, Nashville, United States	United States	1–0	1–3	Friendly
11	25 February 2025	Stade Marie-Marvingt, Le Mans, France	France	1–2	2–3	2025 UEFA Women's Nations League
12	8 April 2025	Valbjarnarvöllur/Thróttarvöllur, Reykjavik, Iceland	Switzerland	1–2	3–3	2025 UEFA Women's Nations League
13	8 April 2025	Valbjarnarvöllur/Thróttarvöllur, Reykjavik, Iceland	Switzerland	2–3	3–3	2025 UEFA Women's Nations League
14	8 April 2025	Valbjarnarvöllur/Thróttarvöllur, Reykjavik, Iceland	Switzerland	3–3	3–3	2025 UEFA Women's Nations League
15	27 June 2025	Serbian FA Sports Center, Stara Pazova, Serbia	Serbia	2–0	3–1	Friendly

== Honours ==
Breiðablik

- Besta deild kvenna: 2018, 2020
- Icelandic Cup: 2018
- Icelandic League Cup: 2019
- Icelandic Women's Football Super Cup: 2019

Bayern Munich

- Frauen-Bundesliga: 2020–21, 2022–23

Iceland Women

- Pinatar Cup: 2023
