= 2018 Úrvalsdeild kvenna (football) =

Úrvalsdeild kvenna
- Season: 2018
- Dates: 3 May 2018 – 22 September 2018
- Champions: Breiðablik
- Relegated: FH and Grindavík
- Matches: 90
- Goals: 291 (3.23 per match)
- Top goalscorer: Berglind Björg Þorvaldsdóttir (19)
- All statistics correct as of 20 October 2018.

The 2018 Úrvalsdeild kvenna is the 47th season of the women's football top-level league in Iceland. Þór/KA is the defending champion. The season is scheduled to begin on 3 May and to conclude on 22 September.

== Teams ==
The 2018 Úrvalsdeild kvenna is contested by ten teams, eight of which played in the division the previous year and two teams promoted from 1. deild kvenna. The bottom two teams from the previous season, Haukar and Fylkir, were relegated to the 1. deild kvenna and were replaced by HK/Víkingur and Selfoss, champions and runners-up of the 2017 1. deild kvenna respectively.

=== Club information ===
Team	Location	Stadium	Capacity
Breiðablik	Kópavogur	Kópavogsvöllur	5,501
FH	Hafnarfjörður	Kaplakrikavöllur	6,738
Grindavík	Grindavík	Grindavíkurvöllur	1,750
HK/Víkingur	Kópavogur/Reykjavík	Kórinn/Víkingsvöllur	2,000/1,449
ÍBV	Vestmannaeyjar	Hásteinsvöllur	3,034
KR	Reykjavík	Alvogenvöllurinn	3,333
Selfoss	Selfoss	Selfossvöllur	950
Stjarnan	Garðabær	Samsung völlurinn	2,300
Valur	Reykjavík	Valsvöllur	2,465
Þór/KA	Akureyri	Þórsvöllur	1,550

Source: Scoresway

== League table ==
Pos	Team	Pld	W	D	L	GF	GA	GD	Pts	Qualification or relegation
1	Breiðablik	18	15	1	2	44	12	+32	46	2019–20 UEFA Women's Champions League
2	Þór/KA	18	13	2	3	49	14	+35	41	
3	Stjarnan	18	12	2	4	46	24	+22	38	
4	Valur	18	10	3	5	40	19	+21	33	
5	ÍBV	18	7	4	7	25	22	+3	25	
6	Selfoss	18	5	5	8	15	25	−10	20	
7	HK/Víkingur	18	5	3	10	22	42	−20	18	
8	KR	18	5	2	11	18	32	−14	17	
9	Grindavík	18	3	4	11	14	40	−26	13	Relegation to 1. deild kvenna
10	FH	18	2	0	16	18	61	−43	6	Relegation to 1. deild kvenna

Updated to match(es) played on 6 September 2018. Source: soccerway.com
Rules for classification: 1) Points; 2) Goal difference; 3) Number of goals scored; 4) Head-to-head points; 5) Head-to-head goal difference; 6) Head-to-head away goals scored
