= Cloé Lacasse =

Canadian soccer player (born 1993)

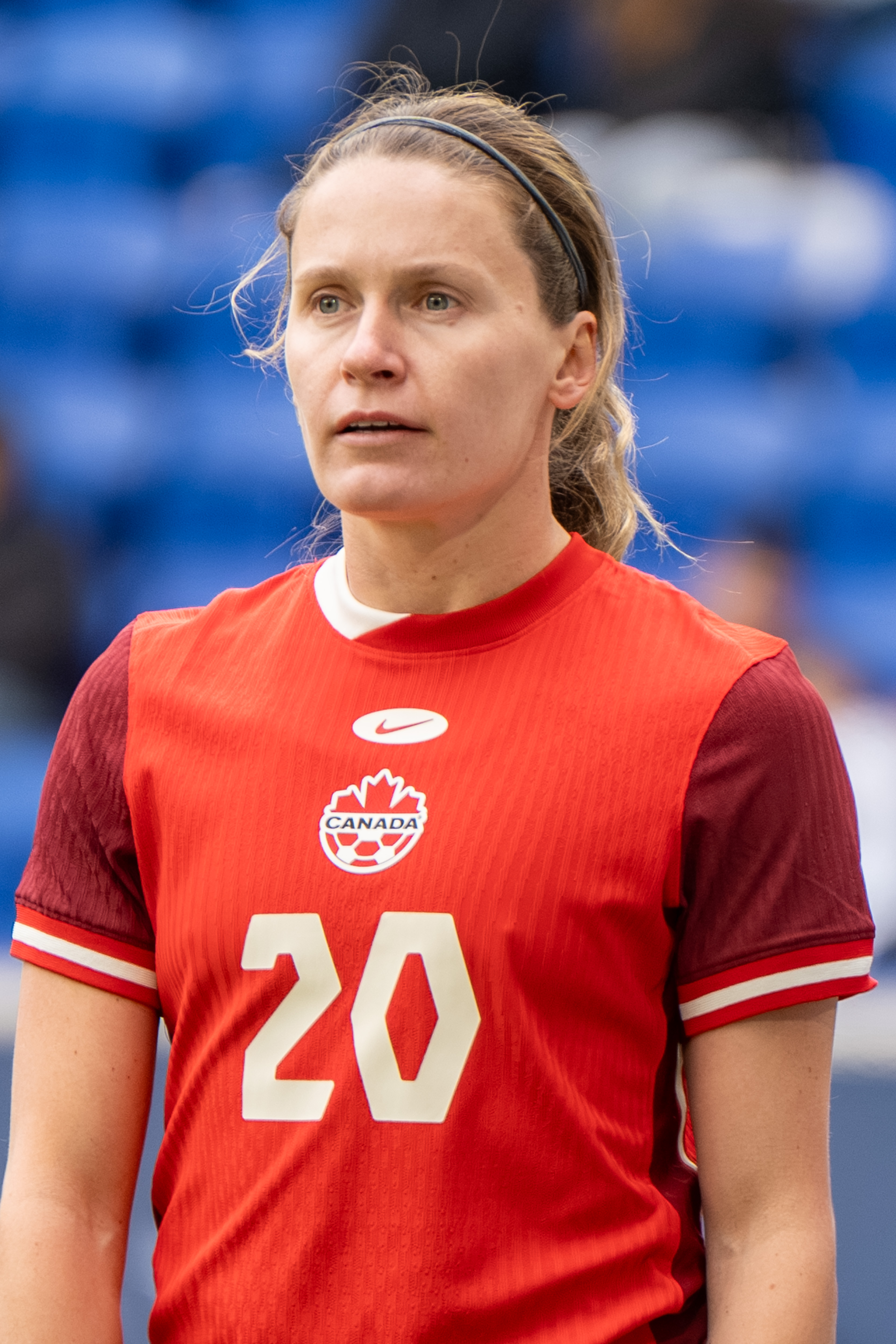
- Lacasse with Canada in 2026

Personal information
- Full name: Cloé Zoé Eyja Lacasse
- Date of birth: July 7, 1993 (age 33)
- Place of birth: Sudbury, Ontario, Canada
- Height: 1.70 m (5 ft 7 in)
- Position: Forward

Team information
- Current team: Utah Royals
- Number: 24

Youth career
- Sudbury Canadians
- 2010: Brampton Brams United

College career
Years	Team	Apps	(Gls)
2011–2014	Iowa Hawkeyes	85	(43)

Senior career*
Years	Team	Apps	(Gls)
2012	Toronto Lady Lynx		
2015–2019	ÍBV	98	(57)
2019–2023	Benfica	76	(72)
2023–2024	Arsenal	18	(3)
2024–	Utah Royals	51	(13)

International career^{‡}
2021–	Canada	48	(6)
- * Club domestic league appearances and goals as of 04:21, November 10, 2026 (UTC) ‡ National team caps and goals as of October 12, 2026

Cloé Zoé Eyja Lacasse (born July 7, 1993) is a Canadian professional soccer player who plays as a forward for National Women's Soccer League (NWSL) club Utah Royals and the Canada national team.

== Early life ==
Lacasse began playing soccer at age five with the Sudbury Canadians before moving on to Brampton Brams United in 2010. She attended École secondaire Macdonald-Cartier, where she helped her team with the provincial OFSAA championship twice in 2010 and 2011. In her youth, she made the national team for taekwondo, where she is a black belt, before deciding to focus solely on soccer at age 12.

== College career ==
Lacasse attended the University of Iowa, where she played for the women's soccer team on a scholarship. In her freshman season in 2011, she led the team in scoring with 12 goals, appearing in all 20 of the team's games, also being named Big Ten Freshman of the Week twice, and was named the team's Most Valuable Offensive Player and to the Big Ten All Freshman Team. In 2012, she was named to the NSCAA All-Great Lakes Region second team and was the co-winner of Iowa's Most Valuable Player award and was named team's Offensive Player of the Year again. In 2013, she was a Second-team All-Big Ten selection and a Second Team NSCAA All-Great Lakes Region selection. In her senior season, she was named to the All Big Ten First Team and was also a First Team NSCAA All-Great Lakes Region, First Team All-Big Ten, was named to the Big Ten All-Tournament team, and was named Iowa's Offensive MVP for a fourth straight season.

Lacasse was the school's top scorer during all her four seasons there. She led the Hawkeyes to their first two Big Ten Tournament Championship games in her final two years at Iowa, and their first NCAA national tournament berth in 2013. Lacasse finished her Iowa career tied for the school record with 112 points (43 goals and 26 assists), while ranking second all-time with 43 goals. She also finished tied for first in shots (306) and second in game-winning goals (13) and assists (26).

== Club career ==
=== Toronto Lady Lynx ===
In 2012, Lacasse played with the Toronto Lady Lynx in the USL W-League.

=== ÍBV ===
After receiving offers to play for teams in the United States and Europe, Lacasse signed with Icelandic club ÍBV in the Úrvalsdeild kvenna in 2015. In 2016, she won the League Cup and in 2017, she won the Icelandic Cup with ÍBV. In 2018, the team were runner-ups in the Super Cup and she was named ÍBV's Player of the Year, and was she was named the league's best player by the newspaper Morgunblaðið.

=== Benfica ===
After being spotted by a Portuguese agent while playing in Iceland, Lacasse signed a two-year contract in July 2019 with Portuguese club Benfica in the Campeonato Nacional Feminino. On November 17, 2021, she became the first player to score a goal for a Portuguese club in the group stage of the UEFA Women's Champions League after scoring the opening goal in a 2–1 victory over BK Häcken FF. In 2021, she extended her contract until 2024. With Benfica, she is a three-time Campeonato Nacional Feminino winner (2020–21, 2021–22, 2022–23), a three-time Taça da Liga winner (2020, 2021, 2022), and a two-time Supertaça de Portugal winner (2019, 2022). In the 2022–23 season, she was voted top player in the league by the players union. In her final season with the club, she scored 35 goals and added 18 assists in 43 games across all competitions. Over her four seasons, she scored over 100 goals and won eight trophies.

=== Arsenal ===
On June 29, 2023, Lacasse signed with Women's Super League club Arsenal. She called the move a "dream", citing a desire to be part of a team with strong internal competition for playing time. On October 6, 2023, Lacasse came on as a substitute in an away match against Manchester United, scoring her first Arsenal goal in second-half stoppage time to help salvage a point in a 2–2 draw. Lacasse scored a goal in the 3–1 victory against Manchester United in front of the first sold-out crowd for a Super League match at Emirates Stadium. She ultimately made 28 appearances for Arsenal across all competitions and won the Women's League Cup with Arsenal, but only started in six of nineteen games in the 2023-24 WSL season.

=== Utah Royals ===
Lacasse with the Utah Royals in 2025

In August 2024, Lacasse transferred to the Utah Royals of the National Women's Soccer League. She scored a first-half hat trick in a 3–0 win over the Seattle Reign on October 13; this was the first hat trick in Utah Royals history. In late October 2024, Lacasse ruptured her ACL and sprained her MCL, forcing her to miss the remainder of the season. After spending ten months recovering from her injury, Lacasse returned to the field on August 8, 2025, in a loss to the Kansas City Current.

== International career ==
In August 2012, Lacasse attended a training camp with the Canada U20 team for the first time, but did not make the team's final roster for their upcoming matches.

After Lacasse was granted Icelandic citizenship in June 2019, the head coach of the Iceland national team, Jón Þór Hauksson, stated that she would be considered for a call-up for the team's next games. Lacasse applied to FIFA and UEFA to be eligible to represent Iceland internationally; however, it was confirmed in July 2020 that her application was denied, as it was ruled she did not meet FIFA's residency requirements to be eligible to represent a new national association. FIFA requires continuous residency for five years after reaching 18 years of age; Lacasse had lived in Iceland for only four years and had since lived elsewhere, meaning she would have had to move back to Iceland and re-start the five-year clock to become eligible.

In April 2021, Lacasse was called up to the Canada national team ahead of friendlies against England and Wales, but did not appear in either match. She was one of the final players cut from the final selections for the Canadian Olympic team for Tokyo shortly afterward, thus missing the team's eventual gold medal win. Given her minimal experience with the national team to that point, she later acknowledged "I knew it was ambitious" to hope to make the squad. She then made her debut for the national team on November 27, 2021, in a friendly against Mexico and was named Canada's player of the match.

Lacasse made her first appearance at a major international tournament as part of the national squad for the 2022 CONCACAF W Championship, winning the silver medal after a loss to the United States in the final. She later scored her first goal for the national team on October 6, 2022, in a 2–0 friendly victory over Argentina.

Continuing to make appearances with the team into 2023, Lacasse was named to the Canadian roster for the 2023 FIFA Women's World Cup. She appeared in all three of the team's matches before Canada was eliminated in the group stage. Following the disappointing results at the World Cup, coach Bev Priestman sought to reorganize the team, and opted to start Lacasse in both of the team's next matches, the CONCACAF Olympic qualification playoff against Jamaica. In the second match, held on home soil at BMO Field, Lacasse scored in the first half to equalize a game that Canada would eventually win 2–1, clinching their fifth consecutive Olympic berth.

In 2024, she was selected for the Canadian Olympic team for Paris. She scored Canada's first goal in their 2–1 win against New Zealand in the opening match.

In February 2026, Lacasse made her return to the national team following her recovery from an ACL rupture, being named to the roster for the 2026 SheBelieves Cup.

== Personal life ==
In 2017, Lacasse stated she was working towards applying for Icelandic citizenship, and said it would be an honour for her to be named to the Icelandic national team. In June 2019, the Icelandic Judicial Affairs and Education Committee recommended that Lacasse's application to be granted Icelandic citizenship be approved. On June 19, 2019, she was officially granted Icelandic citizenship but, as described above, she was ultimately ruled ineligible to play for Iceland.

In December 2025, Lacasse announced her engagement.

== Career statistics ==
=== Club ===
As of August 3, 2026

Appearances and goals by club, season and competition
Club	Season	League			National cup		League cup		Continental		Other		Total	
Club	Season	Division	Apps	Goals	Apps	Goals	Apps	Goals	Apps	Goals	Apps	Goals	Apps	Goals
ÍBV	2015	Úrvalsdeild kvenna	17	7	2	2	3	1	—		—		22	10
ÍBV	2016	Úrvalsdeild kvenna	18	13	4	3	7	4	—		—		29	20
ÍBV	2017	Úrvalsdeild kvenna	15	13	4	3	6	3	—		—		25	19
ÍBV	2018	Úrvalsdeild kvenna	17	10	1	0	0	0	—		1 (Note: Appearance in Icelandic Women's Football Super Cup.)	0	19	10
ÍBV	2019	Úrvalsdeild kvenna	12	11	1	1	5	2	—		—		18	14
ÍBV	Total		79	54	12	9	22	10	0	0	1	0	113	73
Benfica	2019–20	Campeonato Nacional Feminino	15	23	3	2	4	2	—		1 (Note: Appearance(s) in Supertaça de Portugal Feminina)	0	23	27
Benfica	2020–21	Campeonato Nacional Feminino	22	16	3	3	0	0	4 (Note: Appearance(s) in UEFA Women's Champions League)	1	0	0	29	20
Benfica	2021–22	Campeonato Nacional Feminino	17	11	3	1	5	4	10	4	1	0	36	20
Benfica	2022–23	Campeonato Nacional Feminino	20	20	5	3	4	2	10	7	2	1	41	33
Benfica	Total		74	70	14	9	13	8	24	12	4	1	129	100
Arsenal	2023–24	FA WSL	15	3	1	0	5	2	2	0	0	0	23	5
Utah Royals	2024	NWSL	9	4	0	0	0	0	0	0	0	0	9	4
Utah Royals	2025	NWSL	12	1	0	0	0	0	0	0	0	0	12	1
Utah Royals	2026	NWSL	18	6	0	0	0	0	0	0	0	0	18	6
Utah Royals	Total		39	11	0	0	0	0	0	0	0	0	39	11
Career total			207	138	27	18	40	20	26	12	5	1	305	189

=== International goals ===
No.	Date	Venue	Opponent	Score	Result	Competition
1.	October 6, 2022	Estadio El Palmar, Cádiz, Spain	Argentina	2–0	2–0	Friendly
2.	September 26, 2023	BMO Field, Toronto, Canada	Jamaica	1–1	2–1	CONCACAF Olympic play-off
3.	December 1, 2023	Starlight Stadium, Langford, Canada	Australia	3–0	5–0	Friendly
4.	February 22, 2024	Shell Energy Stadium, Houston, United States	El Salvador	1–0	6–0	2024 CONCACAF W Gold Cup
5.	June 1, 2024	Stade Saputo, Montréal, Canada	Mexico	2–0	2–0	Friendly
6.	July 25, 2024	Stade Geoffroy-Guichard, Saint-Étienne, France	New Zealand	1–1	2–1	2024 Summer Olympics

== Honours ==
ÍBV

- Icelandic Women's Football Cup: 2017
- Icelandic Women's Football League Cup: 2016
- Icelandic Women's Football Super Cup runner-up: 2018

Benfica

- Campeonato Nacional Feminino: 2020–21, 2021–22, 2022–23
- Taça da Liga Feminina: 2019–20, 2020–21, 2022–23
- Supertaça de Portugal Feminina: 2019, 2022, 2023

Arsenal

- FA Women's League Cup: 2023–24

Canada

- CONCACAF W Championship runner-up: 2022
- SheBelieves Cup runner-up: 2024, 2026

Individual

- ÍBV's Player of the Year: 2018
- Campeonato Nacional Feminino Player of the Year: 2022–23
- Campeonato Nacional Feminino Golden Boot: 2019–20, 2022–23
- WSL Goal of the Month: October 2023
- Arsenal Women's Player of the Month: February 2024
