= Hólmfríður Magnúsdóttir =

Icelandic footballer (born 1984)

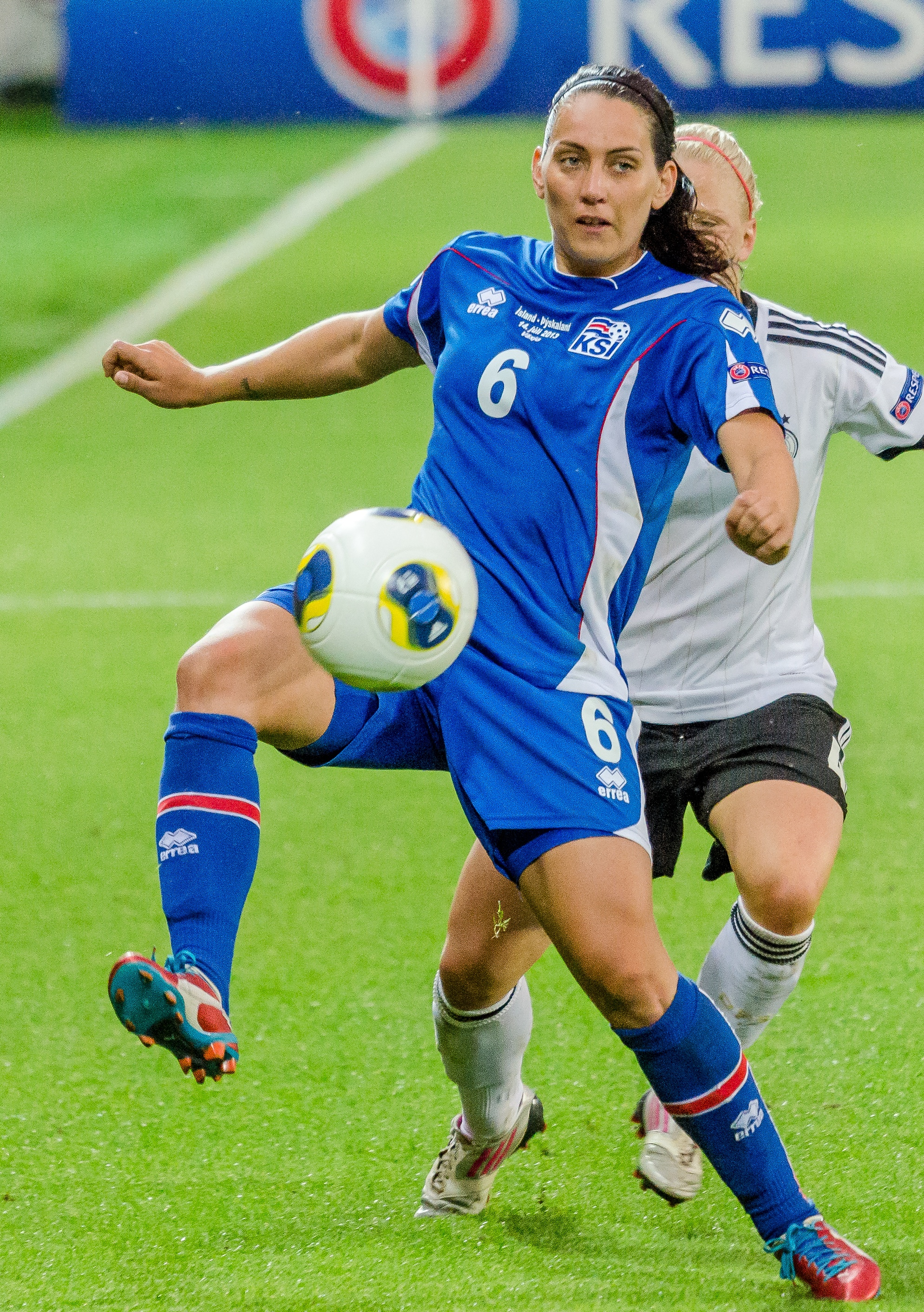
- Hólmfríður playing for Iceland at UEFA Women's Euro 2013

Personal information
- Full name: Hólmfríður Magnúsdóttir
- Date of birth: 20 September 1984 (age 42)
- Place of birth: Reykjavík, Iceland
- Height: 1.71 m (5 ft 7 in)
- Position: Midfielder

Team information
- Current team: Selfoss
- Number: 26

Senior career*
Years	Team	Apps	(Gls)
2000–2004	KR	53	(37)
2005	ÍBV	14	(11)
2006	KR	12	(19)
2006–2007	Fortuna Hjørring		
2007–2008	KR	31	(33)
2009	Kristianstads DFF	21	(5)
2010–2011	Philadelphia Independence	31	(4)
2011	Valur	8	(6)
2012–2016	Avaldsnes IL	70	(45)
2017	KR	13	(6)
2019–2020	Selfoss	25	(9)
2020	Avaldsnes IL	4	(1)
2021–	Selfoss	27	(5)

International career^{‡}
2000	Iceland U17	4	(1)
2001–2002	Iceland U19	8	(1)
2002–2006	Iceland U21	14	(3)
2003–2020	Iceland	113	(37)
- * Club domestic league appearances and goals as of 16 March 2021 ‡ National team caps and goals as of 16 March 2021

Hólmfríður "Fríða" Magnúsdóttir (born 20 September 1984) is an Icelandic footballer who plays as a left winger or as an attacking midfielder. Hólmfríður was a part of Iceland's national team from 2003 to 2020 and represented her country at the 2009 and 2013 editions of the UEFA Women's Championship.

== Club career ==
At the 2009 WPS International Draft, Hólmfríður was picked fifth by the Philadelphia Independence, one of two expansion teams entering Women's Professional Soccer (WPS). She was often deployed as a left back by coach Paul Riley and made 31 appearances in two seasons with the Independence, scoring four goals.

During her second season, 2011, Hólmfríður struggled with fitness after being injured and was allowed to move back to Iceland with Valur. Philadelphia brought her back for 2012, but the league folded before the campaign began. Instead Hólmfríður accepted a contract from ambitious Norwegian club Avaldsnes IL, then languishing in the First Division. During her stay with Avaldsnes, she was sexually harassed and stalked by her coach, Tom Nordlie, which led to his firing.

In November 2016, Hólmfríður rejoined her hometown club, KR.

Hólmfríður sat out the 2018 season due to pregnancy. After contemplating retiring, she signed with Úrvalsdeild kvenna club Selfoss in April 2019, and started training five days before the 2019 Úrvalsdeild season started. On 17 August 2019, Hólmfríður scored in Selfoss' 2–1 victory against KR in the Icelandic Cup finals, securing the club's first major trophy.

In September 2020, Hólmfríður returned to Norway and signed with Avaldsnes again. She finished the season with Avaldsnes, scoring one goal in four games, before returning to Selfoss in December 2020. She appeared in one game in the Icelandic Women's Football League Cup on 28 February 2021.

On 16 March 2021, Hólmfríður announced her retirement from football. A month later, she reversed her decision and decided to return to Selfoss. She appeared in eleven matches, scoring three goals, before the club announced on 17 August that due to being pregnant with her second child she would be leaving the team. She returned in 2022, appearing in 4 games in the top-tier. After missing all of 2023 due to a life-threatening illness, Hólmfríður returned once again in May 2024.

== International career ==
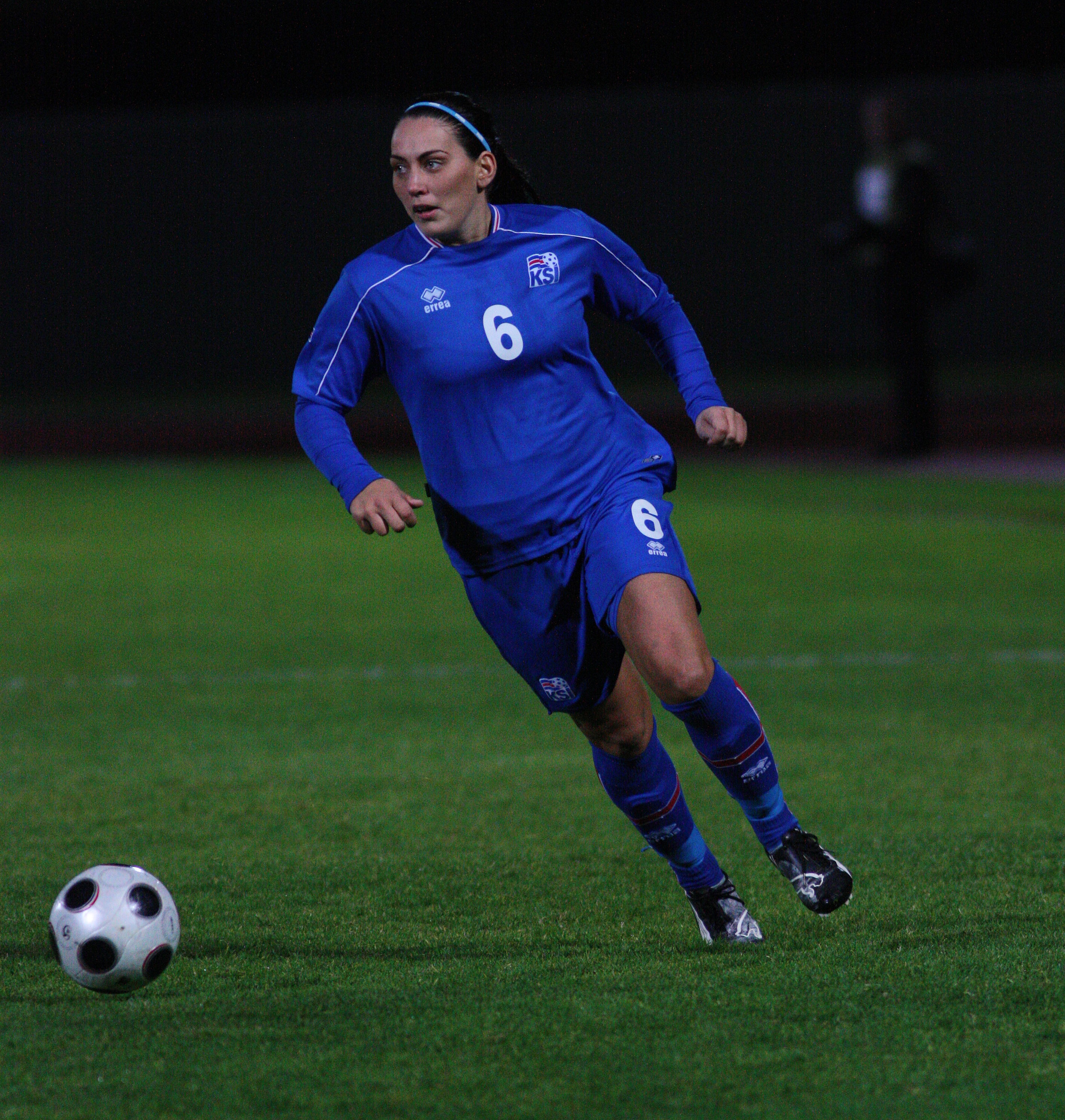
Hólmfríður playing against Estonia in September 2009

Hólmfríður made her senior international debut for Iceland in a 1–0 friendly defeat to the United States on 16 February 2003.

In Iceland's UEFA Women's Euro 2009 qualifying play-off against the Republic of Ireland, Hólmfríður scored in the first minute of the first leg in Dublin. At the final tournament, she played in all three group matches as Iceland were eliminated in the first round.

National team coach Siggi Eyjólfsson selected Hólmfríður in his Iceland squad for UEFA Women's Euro 2013. Again she featured in all three group matches but collected two yellow cards and was suspended for Iceland's 4–0 quarter-final defeat to hosts Sweden.

In October 2020, Hólmfríður was selected to the national team squad for the first time in three years, replacing injured Dagný Brynjarsdóttir.

== International goals ==
No.	Date	Venue	Opponent	Score	Result	Competition
1.	13 September 2003	Reykjavík, Iceland	Poland	1–0	10–0	UEFA Women's Euro 2005 qualifying
2.	12 March 2007	Lagos, Portugal	Portugal	2–1	5–1	2007 Algarve Cup
3.	12 March 2007	Lagos, Portugal	Portugal	3–1	5–1	2007 Algarve Cup
4.	12 March 2007	Lagos, Portugal	Portugal	4–1	5–1	2007 Algarve Cup
5.	26 June 2008	Reykjavík, Iceland	Greece	2–0	7–0	UEFA Women's Euro 2009 qualifying
6.	26 June 2008	Reykjavík, Iceland	Greece	4–0	7–0	UEFA Women's Euro 2009 qualifying
7.	26 June 2008	Reykjavík, Iceland	Greece	5–0	7–0	UEFA Women's Euro 2009 qualifying
8.	26 October 2008	Dublin, Ireland	Republic of Ireland	1–0	1–1	UEFA Women's Euro 2009 qualifying
9.	22 August 2009	Tampere, Finland	France	1–0	1–3	UEFA Women's Euro 2009
10.	17 September 2009	Reykjavík, Iceland	Estonia	8–0	12–0	2011 FIFA Women's World Cup qualification
11.	17 September 2009	Reykjavík, Iceland	Estonia	10–0	12–0	2011 FIFA Women's World Cup qualification
12.	17 September 2009	Reykjavík, Iceland	Estonia	11–0	12–0	2011 FIFA Women's World Cup qualification
13.	26 February 2010	Vila Real de Santo António, Portugal	Sweden	1–0	1–5	2010 Algarve Cup
14.	1 March 2010	Silves, Portugal	Norway	2–3	2–3	2010 Algarve Cup
15.	3 March 2010	Faro, Portugal	Portugal	1–0	3–0	2010 Algarve Cup
16.	27 March 2010	Banatski Dvor, Serbia	Serbia	1–0	2–0	2011 FIFA Women's World Cup qualification
17.	27 March 2010	Banatski Dvor, Serbia	Serbia	2–0	2–0	2011 FIFA Women's World Cup qualification
18.	22 June 2010	Reykjavík, Iceland	Croatia	1–0	3–0	2011 FIFA Women's World Cup qualification
19.	22 June 2010	Reykjavík, Iceland	Croatia	2–0	3–0	2011 FIFA Women's World Cup qualification
20.	19 May 2011	Reykjavík, Iceland	Bulgaria	4–0	6–0	UEFA Women's Euro 2013 qualifying
21.	17 September 2011	Reykjavík, Iceland	Norway	1–0	3–1	UEFA Women's Euro 2013 qualifying
22.	17 September 2011	Reykjavík, Iceland	Norway	3–0	3–1	UEFA Women's Euro 2013 qualifying
23.	26 October 2011	Belfast, Northern Ireland	Northern Ireland	2–0	2–0	UEFA Women's Euro 2013 qualifying
24.	7 March 2012	Ferreiras, Portugal	Denmark	1–2	1–3	2012 Algarve Cup
25.	16 June 2012	Reykjavík, Iceland	Hungary	2–0	3–0	UEFA Women's Euro 2013 qualifying
26.	15 September 2012	Reykjavík, Iceland	Northern Ireland	1–0	2–0	UEFA Women's Euro 2013 qualifying
27.	20 October 2012	Sevastopol, Ukraine	Ukraine	2–0	3–2	UEFA Women's Euro 2013 qualifying
28.	8 March 2013	Albufeira, Portugal	Sweden	1–6	1–6	2013 Algarve Cup
29.	1 June 2013	Reykjavík, Iceland	Scotland	2–3	2–3	Friendly
30.	19 June 2014	Reykjavík, Iceland	Malta	1–0	5–0	2015 FIFA Women's World Cup qualification
31.	22 September 2015	Reykjavík, Iceland	Belarus	1–0	2–0	UEFA Women's Euro 2017 qualifying
32.	4 March 2016	Parchal, Portugal	Denmark	3–1	4–1	2016 Algarve Cup
33.	4 March 2016	Parchal, Portugal	Denmark	4–1	4–1	2016 Algarve Cup
