= Miyah Watford =

American soccer player

Personal information
- Full name: Miyah Ashley Watford
- Date of birth: August 3, 1998 (age 28)
- Place of birth: Indianapolis, Indiana, USA
- Height: 5 ft 7 in (1.70 m)
- Position: Forward

Team information
- Current team: ÍBV
- Number: 5

College career
Years	Team	Apps	(Gls)
2017–2019	Murray State Racers	55	(31)

Senior career*
Years	Team	Apps	(Gls)
2020–	ÍBV	15	(3)
- * Club domestic league appearances and goals as of October 33, 2020

Miyah Watford (born August 3, 1998) is an American professional soccer player who currently plays for ÍBV of the Úrvalsdeild kvenna. She played college soccer at Murray State Racers.

== Early years ==
Watford grew up in Indianapolis, Indiana, alongside one sister, Malia Withers, and one brother, Marvin Watford Jr. She is the daughter of René and Marvin Watford Sr.

== College career ==
Watford played for the Murray State Racers, finishing her university career with 31 goals and 14 assists in 55 games. She was named the 2019 OVC Offensive Player of the Year and set records for her school by breaking the single-season record for goals and points.

== Professional career ==
=== ÍBV, 2020–present ===
Watford signed her first professional contract with ÍBV following her senior season at Murray State. ÍBV, located in Vestmannaeyjar, Iceland, competes in the Úrvalsdeild kvenna – the top-tier women's professional soccer league in Iceland.

On 15 June 2020, Watford made her Úrvalsdeild kvenna debut against Þróttur Reykjavík and scored her first goal just six minutes into the game. The match ended in a 4–3 victory, with Watford scoring two goals and winning a crucial penalty, which was converted by Fatma Kara.
