= 2016 Algarve Cup =

International women's football tournament

Tournament details
- Host country: Portugal
- Dates: 2–9 March
- Teams: 8 (from 4 confederations)
- Venues: 4 (in 4 host cities)

Final positions
- Champions: Canada (1st title)
- Runners-up: Brazil
- Third place: Iceland
- Fourth place: New Zealand

Tournament statistics
- Matches played: 16
- Goals scored: 38 (2.38 per match)
- Top scorer(s): (Belgium) Janice Cayman (4 goals)
- Best player: (Canada) Kadeisha Buchanan
- Fair play award: Denmark

The 2016 Algarve Cup was the 23rd edition of the Algarve Cup, an invitational women's football tournament held annually in Portugal. It took place from 2 to 9 March.

== Teams ==
Team	FIFA Rankings (December 2015)
Brazil	7
Canada	11
Denmark	15
New Zealand	16
Iceland	19
Russia	22
Belgium	28
Portugal	40

== Referees ==
On 19 February 2016, FIFA announced the referees and the assistant referees for the tournament.

Confederation	Referees	Assistant referees
AFC	(Myanmar) Aye Thein	(South Korea) Lee Seul Gi (Vietnam) Thi Le Trinh Truong
CAF	(Ethiopia) Ledya Tafesse	(Ghana) Emmanuella Aglago (Cameroon) Josiane Mbakop
CONMEBOL	(Costa Rica) Marianela Araya Cruz (Paraguay) Olga Miranda	(Cuba) Nereida Diaz (Costa Rica) Katherine Jimenez (Brazil) Neuza Back (Venezuela) Yoleida Lara
OFC	(Cook Islands) Tupou Patia	(Samoa) Maria Tamalelagi (Fiji) Lonisa Elite Dilioni
UEFA	(Portugal) Sandra Braz (Poland) Monika Mularczyk (Sweden) Sara Persson	(Portugal) Olga Martins (North Macedonia) Biljana Atanasovski (Poland) Anna Dabrowska (Poland) Katarzyna Wojs (Sweden) Annica Johansson (Sweden) Julia Magnusson

== Group stage ==
The groups were announced on 14 December 2015, with the match schedule being announced on 10 February 2016.
All times WET (UTC±00:00).

=== Tie-breaking criteria ===
For the group stage of this tournament, where two or more teams in a group tied on an equal number of points, the finishing positions will be determined by the following tie-breaking criteria in the following order:

1. number of points obtained in the matches among the teams in question
2. goal difference in all the group matches
3. number of goals scored in all the group matches
4. fair-play ranking in all the group matches
5. FIFA ranking

=== Group A ===
Pos	Team	Pld	W	D	L	GF	GA	GD	Pts
1	Canada	3	2	0	1	2	1	+1	6
2	Iceland	3	2	0	1	6	3	+3	6
3	Belgium	3	1	0	2	3	4	−1	3
4	Denmark	3	1	0	2	3	6	−3	3

2 March 2016
15:00

Iceland	2–1	Belgium
Jónsdóttir 5'; Brynjarsdóttir 90+2'	Report	Cayman 42'

Lagos Municipal Stadium, Lagos
Referee: Ledya Tafesse (Ethiopia)
2 March 2016
15:00

Canada	0–1	Denmark
	Report	Nadim 55'

Albufeira Municipal Stadium, Albufeira
Referee: Olga Miranda (Paraguay)

4 March 2016
15:00

Canada	1–0	Belgium
Clarke 87'	Report

VRS António Sports Complex, Vila Real de Santo António
Referee: Sandra Braz (Portugal)
4 March 2016
15:00

Denmark	1–4	Iceland
Nadim 53'	Report	Þorvaldsdóttir 11'; Ómarsdóttir 12'; Magnúsdóttir 56', 90'

Bela Vista Municipal Stadium, Parchal
Referee: Tupou Patia (Cook Islands)

Note: The Football Association of Iceland match report lists Elín Metta Jensen (10'), Denmark own goal (12'), Sandra Jessen (59') and Hólmfríður Magnúsdóttir (90') as the goal scorers of this match. However, for the statistics purpose of this page, the data provided by the tournament's organizer (Portuguese Football Federation) is being used.

7 March 2016
18:30

Denmark	1–2	Belgium
Sandvej 90+3'	Report	Sørensen 43' (o.g.); Cayman 86'

Albufeira Municipal Stadium, Albufeira
Referee: Aye Thein (Myanmar)
7 March 2016
18:30

Canada	1–0	Iceland
Beckie 41'	Report

Lagos Municipal Stadium, Lagos
Referee: Monika Mularczyk (Poland)

=== Group B ===
Pos	Team	Pld	W	D	L	GF	GA	GD	Pts
1	Brazil	3	3	0	0	7	1	+6	9
2	New Zealand	3	1	1	1	1	1	0	4
3	Russia	3	1	1	1	1	3	−2	4
4	Portugal	3	0	0	3	1	5	−4	0

2 March 2016
18:00

Portugal	0–1	Russia
	Report	Makarenko 58'

Albufeira Municipal Stadium, Albufeira
Referee: Sara Persson (Sweden)
2 March 2016
18:30

Brazil	1–0	New Zealand
Debinha 20'	Report

Lagos Municipal Stadium, Lagos
Referee: Marianela Araya (Costa Rica)

4 March 2016
18:30

New Zealand	0–0	Russia
	Report

Bela Vista Municipal Stadium, Parchal
Referee: Aye Thein (Myanmar)
4 March 2016
20:00

Portugal	1–3	Brazil
T. Pinto 30'	Report	Cristiane 17'; Marta 22'; Raquel 74'

VRS António Sports Complex, Vila Real de Santo António
Referee: Monika Mularczyk (Poland)

7 March 2016
15:00

Brazil	3–0	Russia
Formiga 51'; Bia 66'; Thaís Guedes 89'	Report

Lagos Municipal Stadium, Lagos
Referee: Sandra Braz (Portugal)
7 March 2016
15:00

Portugal	0–1	New Zealand
	Report	Hearn 78'

Albufeira Municipal Stadium, Albufeira
Referee: Ledya Tafesse (Ethiopia)

Note: The New Zealand Football match report lists Annalie Longo (69') as the goal scorer of this match. However, for the statistics purpose of this page, the data provided by the tournament's organizer (Portuguese Football Federation) is being used.

== Placement matches ==
Matches times and venues were announced on 7 March 2016.

=== 7th Place ===
9 March 2016
15:00

Denmark	3–1	Portugal
Troelsgaard 4', 11'; Rasmussen 81'	Report	Di. Silva 73'

Bela Vista Municipal Stadium, Parchal
Referee: Tupou Patia (Cook Islands)

=== 5th Place ===
9 March 2016
14:00

Belgium	5–0	Russia
Wullaert 18'; Cayman 42', 73'; Schryvers 51'; Coutereels 61' (pen.)	Report

VRS António Sports Complex, Vila Real de Santo António
Referee: Marianela Araya Cruz (Costa Rica)

=== 3rd Place ===
9 March 2016
17:30

Iceland	1–1	New Zealand
A. Hauksdóttir 27'	Report	Hearn 70'
Penalties
Viggósdóttir (penalty scored); Viðarsdóttir (penalty scored); Brynjarsdóttir (penalty scored); Jessen (penalty scored); Þorsteinsdóttir (penalty scored); Friðriksdóttir (penalty scored)	6–5	(penalty scored) Percival; (penalty scored) Anna Green; (penalty scored) Stott; (penalty scored) Hassett; (penalty scored) White; (penalty missed) ???

VRS António Sports Complex, Vila Real de Santo António
Referee: Olga Miranda (Paraguay)

Note: The official match report lists just the players who converted the penalties, in no particular order. New Zealand Football reports the missed penalty as being the sixth from New Zealand, citing Anna Green as the player who missed (contradicting the official report), without providing any information on the players who successfully converted their penalties. For the statistics purpose of this page, the data provided by the tournament's organizer (Portuguese Football Federation) is being used.

=== Final ===
9 March 2016
18:30

Canada	2–1	Brazil
Zadorsky 60'; Beckie 67'	Report	Andressa Alves 90'

Bela Vista Municipal Stadium, Parchal
Referee: Sara Persson (Sweden)

Note: The Brazilian Football Confederation match report lists Cristiane as the Brazilian goal scorer of this match. However, for the statistics purpose of this page, the data provided by the tournament's organizer (Portuguese Football Federation) is being used.

== Final standings ==
Rank	Team
1st place, gold medalist(s)	Canada
2nd place, silver medalist(s)	Brazil
3rd place, bronze medalist(s)	Iceland
4	New Zealand
5	Belgium
6	Russia
7	Denmark
8	Portugal

Tournament's best player	Team
Kadeisha Buchanan	Canada

Fair play award
Denmark

== Goalscorers ==
4 goals

- (Belgium) Janice Cayman

2 goals

- (Canada) Janine Beckie
- (Denmark) Nadia Nadim
- (Denmark) Sanne Troelsgaard
- (Iceland) Hólmfríður Magnúsdóttir
- (New Zealand) Amber Hearn

1 goal

- (Belgium) Maud Coutereels
- (Belgium) Tine Schryvers
- (Belgium) Tessa Wullaert
- (Brazil) Andressa Alves
- (Brazil) Bia
- (Brazil) Cristiane
- (Brazil) Debinha
- (Brazil) Formiga
- (Brazil) Marta
- (Brazil) Raquel
- (Brazil) Thaís Guedes
- (Canada) Summer Clarke
- (Canada) Shelina Zadorsky
- (Denmark) Johanna Rasmussen
- (Denmark) Cecilie Sandvej
- (Iceland) Dagný Brynjarsdóttir
- (Iceland) Andrea Rán Snæfeld Hauksdóttir
- (Iceland) Gunnhildur Yrsa Jónsdóttir
- (Iceland) Katrín Ómarsdóttir
- (Iceland) Berglind Björg Þorvaldsdóttir
- (Portugal) Tatiana Pinto
- (Portugal) Diana Silva
- (Russia) Daria Makarenko

Own goal

- (Denmark) Simone Boye Sørensen (playing against Belgium)
