= Stephany Mayor =

Mexican footballer (born 1991)

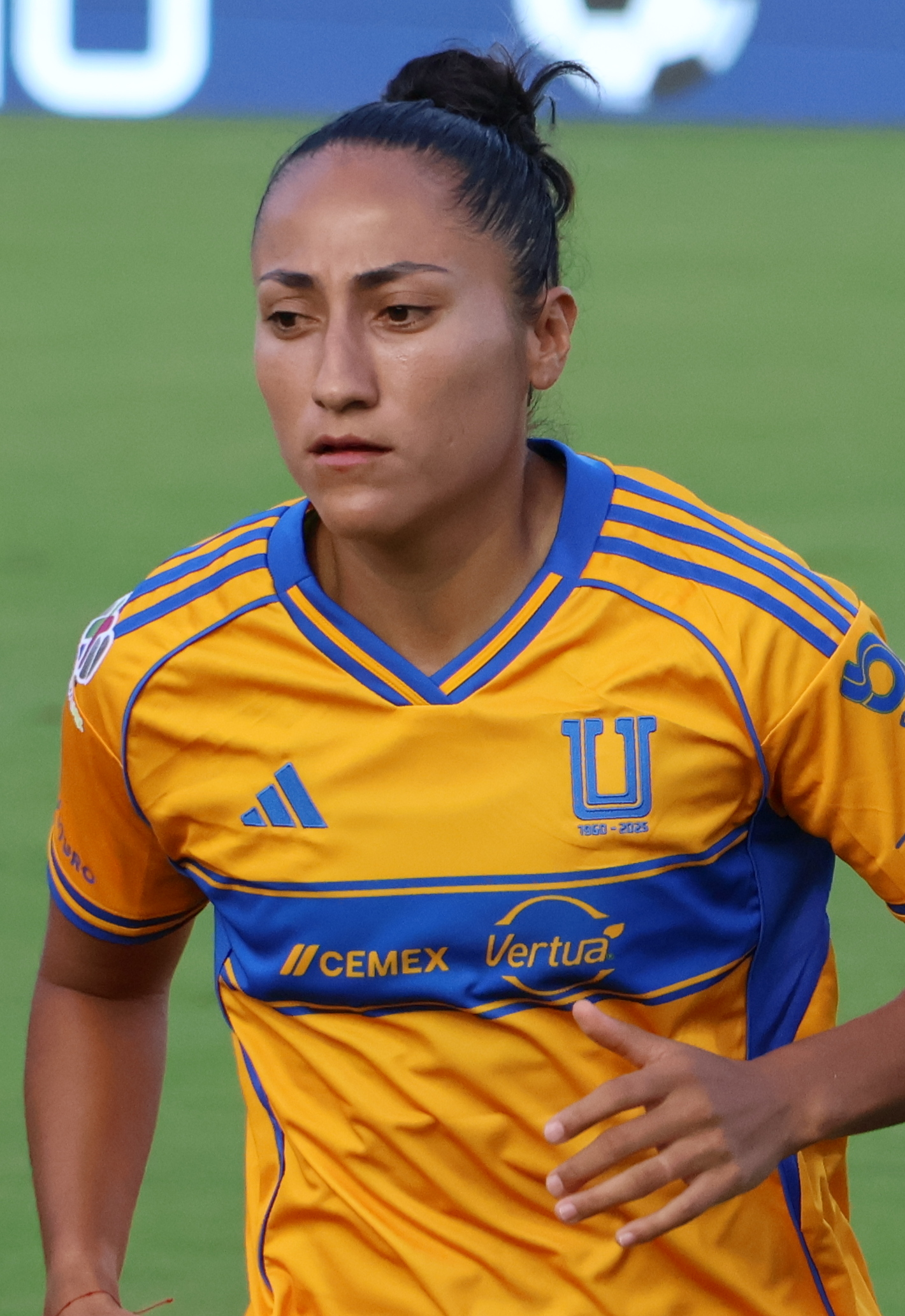
- Mayor with Tigres UANL in 2025

Personal information
- Full name: Sandra Stephany Mayor Gutiérrez
- Date of birth: 23 September 1991 (age 35)
- Place of birth: Mexico City, Mexico
- Height: 1.62 m (5 ft 4 in)
- Position: Attacking midfielder

Team information
- Current team: UANL
- Number: 9

Senior career*
Years	Team	Apps	(Gls)
2016–2019	Þór/KA	49	(40)
2020–	UANL	160	(87)

International career^{‡}
2008–2010	Mexico U-20		
2010–	Mexico	92	(21)
Medal record
Women's football
Representing Mexico
Central American and Caribbean Games
Gold medal – first place	2023 San Salvador
- * Club domestic league appearances and goals as of 2 September 2025 ‡ National team caps and goals as of 10 April 2021

Sandra Stephany Mayor Gutiérrez (born 23 September 1991) is a Mexican professional footballer who plays as a forward for Liga MX Femenil club Tigres UANL and the Mexico national team.

== Early life ==
Mayor is from Azcapotzalco, an industrial suburb of Mexico City. She played on boy's teams growing up and later on Mexican youth national teams.

== Club career ==
=== Collegiate ===
Mayor played for Universidad de las Américas Puebla.

=== Úrvalsdeild ===
Mayor signed for Icelandic Úrvalsdeild kvenna team Þór/KA in February 2016. On 28 September 2017, she won the Icelandic championship with Þór/KA after defeating FH, in the last game of the season, 2–0 with goals from Sandra Jessen and herself. She scored 19 goals in the 2017 season, becoming the second foreign player to win the league's golden boot, and was also named the league's player of the year.

On 24 April, she helped Þór/KA win the 2018 League Cup. On 29 April, she scored one goal in Þór/KA's 3–0 victory against ÍBV women's football in the Icelandic Super Cup.

== International career ==
In international competitions she played in the Women's 2011 World Cup in Germany where she represented Mexico against England, Japan, and New Zealand. In the Women's World Cup she scored in the game against New Zealand in the 2nd minute to open the scoring. In October 2017, she had a total of 55 international cups and 10 goals.

== Personal life ==
In June 2016, fellow Mexico women's national teammate Bianca Sierra announced publicly that she had a relationship with Mayor. Mayor and Sierra are believed to be the first openly gay athletes in Mexican history. Previously, in 2015, Mexican coach, Leonardo Cuellar, had warned Mayor and Sierra to avoid any "stunts" or "holding hands". In 2016, Mayor was not selected by Cuellar to play for the Mexico national team and Sierra declined to play on the national team. Mayor departed Mexico to play in Iceland. Sierra later joined her in Iceland.

Mayor rejoined the Mexico national team, under new coach Roberto Medina, for a friendly match against Venezuela on 10 June 2017. Sierra rejoined the national team shortly thereafter.

== Career statistics ==
Scores and results list Mexico's goal tally first.

No.	Date	Venue	Opponent	Score	Result	Competition
1.	9 March 2011	Paralimni Stadium, Paralimni, Cyprus	New Zealand	1–0	5–0	2011 Cyprus Women's Cup
2.	9 March 2011	Paralimni Stadium, Paralimni, Cyprus	New Zealand	2–0	5–0	2011 Cyprus Women's Cup
3.	9 March 2011	Paralimni Stadium, Paralimni, Cyprus	New Zealand	5–0	5–0	2011 Cyprus Women's Cup
4.	5 July 2011	Rhein-Neckar-Arena, Sinsheim, Germany	New Zealand	1–0	2–2	2011 FIFA Women's World Cup
5.	18 October 2014	Toyota Park, Bridgeview, United States	Martinique	3–0	10–0	2014 CONCACAF Women's Championship
6.	21 October 2014	RFK Stadium, Washington, D.C., United States	Jamaica	1–1	3–1	2014 CONCACAF Women's Championship
7.	26 October 2014	PPL Park, Chester, United States	Trinidad and Tobago	1–0	4–2 (a.e.t.)	2014 CONCACAF Women's Championship
8.	21 November 2014	Estadio Unidad Deportiva Hugo Sánchez, Veracruz, Mexico	Haiti	1–0	1–0	2014 Central American and Caribbean Games
9.	18 July 2015	Tim Hortons Field, Hamilton, Canada	Trinidad and Tobago	1–0	3–1	2015 Pan American Games
10.	18 July 2015	Tim Hortons Field, Hamilton, Canada	Trinidad and Tobago	2–0	3–1	2015 Pan American Games
11.	24 July 2015	Tim Hortons Field, Hamilton, Canada	Canada	2–0	2–1	2015 Pan American Games
12.	31 July 2019	Estadio Universidad San Marcos, Lima, Peru	Paraguay	1–1	1–2	2019 Pan American Games
13.	6 August 2019	Estadio Universidad San Marcos, Lima, Peru	Panama	3–0	5–1	2019 Pan American Games
14.	1 February 2020	H-E-B Park, Edinburg, United States	Saint Kitts and Nevis	3–0	6–0	2020 CONCACAF Women's Olympic Qualifying Championship
15.	27 November 2021	Centro de Alto Rendimiento, Mexico City, Mexico	Canada	1–0	2–1	Friendly
16.	17 February 2022	Estadio Universitario, San Nicolás de los Garza, Mexico	Suriname	1–0	9–0	2022 CONCACAF W Championship qualification
17.	20 February 2022	Estadio Olímpico Félix Sánchez, Santo Domingo, Dominican Republic	Antigua and Barbuda	1–0	8–0	2022 CONCACAF W Championship qualification
18.	20 February 2022	Estadio Olímpico Félix Sánchez, Santo Domingo, Dominican Republic	Antigua and Barbuda	3–0	8–0	2022 CONCACAF W Championship qualification
19.	9 April 2022	Raymond E. Guishard Stadium, The Valley, Anguilla	Anguilla	4–0	11–0	2022 CONCACAF W Championship qualification
20.	25 June 2022	Estadio Corona, Torreón, Mexico	Peru	1–0	5–1	Friendly
21.	21 February 2023	Estadio León, León, Mexico	Colombia	1–1	1–1	2023 Women's Revelations Cup
22.	3 July 2023	Estadio Las Delicias, Santa Tecla, El Salvador	Jamaica	5–2	7–3	2023 Central American and Caribbean Games
23.	3 July 2023	Estadio Las Delicias, Santa Tecla, El Salvador	Jamaica	7–3	7–3	2023 Central American and Caribbean Games
24.	7 July 2023	Estadio Las Delicias, Santa Tecla, El Salvador	Venezuela	1–0	2–1 (a.e.t.)	2023 Central American and Caribbean Games

== Honours ==
Þór/KA

- Besta deild kvenna: 2017
- Super Cup: 2018
- League Cup: 2018

UANL

- Liga MX Femenil: Guardianes 2020, Guardianes 2021, Apertura 2025

Individual

- Úrvalsdeild Player of the Year: 2017
- Úrvalsdeild Golden Boot: 2017

== See also ==
- List of Mexican Fútbol (soccer) athletes
