= Sandra Jessen =

Icelandic footballer (born 1995)

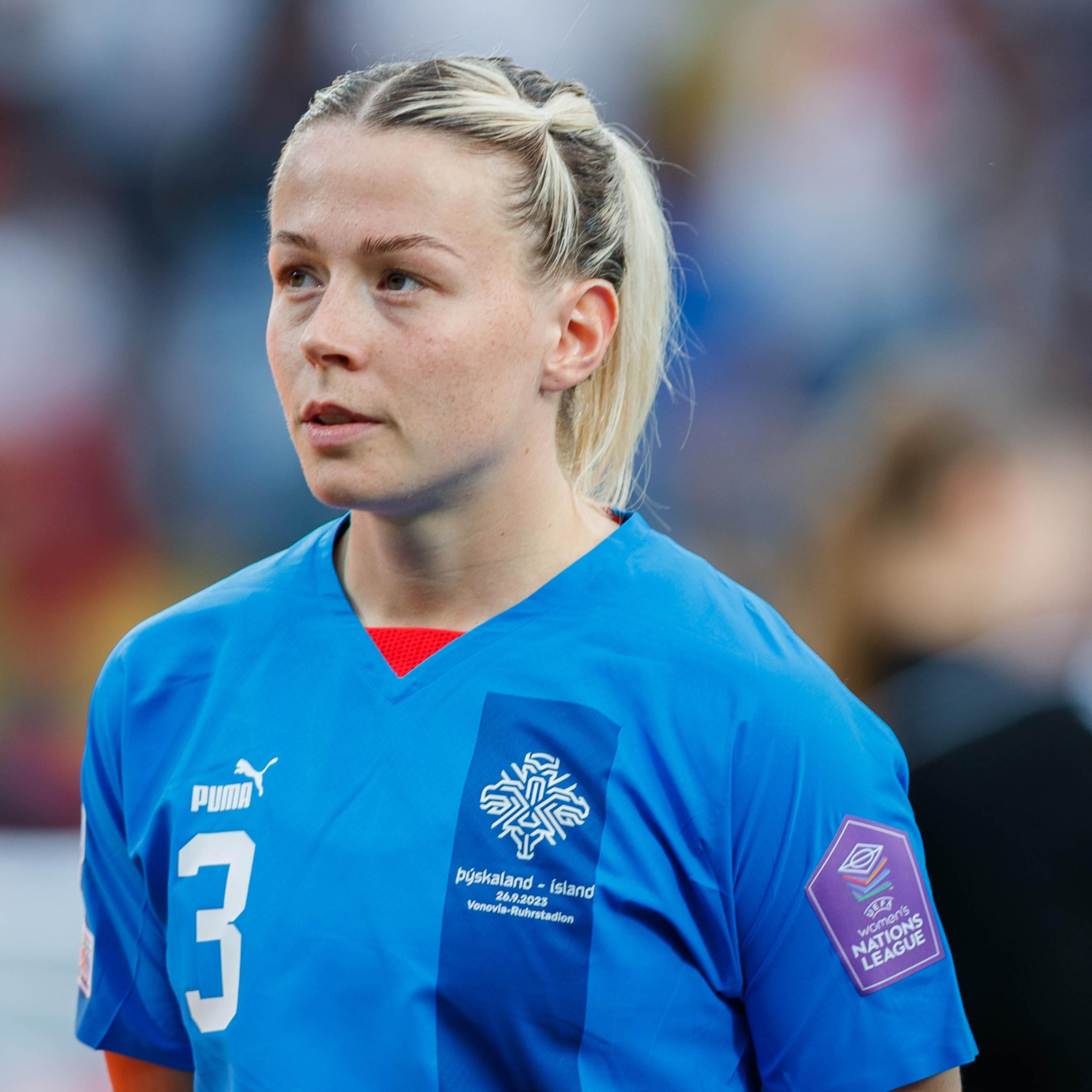
- Jessen with Iceland in 2023

Personal information
- Full name: Sandra María Jessen
- Date of birth: 18 January 1995 (age 31)
- Place of birth: Iceland
- Height: 1.68 m (5 ft 6 in)
- Position: Midfielder

Team information
- Current team: 1. FC Köln
- Number: 6

Senior career*
Years	Team	Apps	(Gls)
2011–2018	Þór/KA	116	(75)
2016	→ Bayer Leverkusen (loan)	8	(0)
2018	→ Slavia Praha (loan)	6	(2)
2019–2021	Bayer Leverkusen	34	(1)
2022–2025	Þór/KA	74	(48)
2025–	1. FC Köln	31	(12)

International career^{‡}
2011–2012	Iceland U17	12	(1)
2012–2014	Iceland U19	12	(1)
2012	Iceland U23	1	(0)
2012–	Iceland	65	(7)
- * Club domestic league appearances and goals as of 19 September 2026 ‡ National team caps and goals as of 27 September 2026

Sandra María Jessen (born 18 January 1995) is an Icelandic professional footballer who plays as a midfielder for Frauen-Bundesliga club 1. FC Köln and the Iceland national team. She won the Icelandic championship with Þór/KA in 2012 and 2017 and was named the Úrvalsdeild kvenna Player of the Year in 2018.

== Club career ==
In February 2016, Sandra joined Bayer Leverkusen on loan for the rest of the 2015–16 Bundesliga season. She rejoined Þór/KA in May 2016.

On 28 September 2017 she won the Icelandic championship with Þór/KA after defeating FH, in the last game of the season, 2–0 with goals from herself and Sandra Stephany Mayor.

On 4 January 2018 Sandra joined Slavia Praha on loan until the end of April. She is scheduled to return before the start of the 2018 Úrvalsdeild kvenna season.

On 22 September 2018, Sandra was voted as the Úrvalsdeild kvenna Player of the Year.

In January 2019, Sandra signed with Bayer Leverkusen.

In January 2022, Sandra signed back with Þór/KA. On 21 June 2023, she suffered a broken hand in a match against Tindastóll.

In August 2025, Sandra joined 1. FC Köln. In the away game against SGS Essen, she scored both goals for her team for a 2–1 victory.

== International career ==
On 13 June 2025, Sandra was called up to the Iceland squad for the UEFA Euro 2025.

== Career statistics ==
=== International ===
Scores and results list Iceland's goal tally first, score column indicates score after each Jessen goal.

List of international goals scored by Sandra Jessen
No.	Date	Venue	Opponent	Score	Result	Competition
1	16 June 2012	Laugardalsvöllur, Reykjavík, Iceland	Hungary	3–0	3–0	UEFA Women's Euro 2013 qualifying
2	13 March 2013	Stadium Bela Vista, Parchal, Portugal	Hungary	4–1	4–1	2013 Algarve Cup
3	26 October 2015	Lendava Sports Park, Lendava, Slovenia	Slovenia	5–0	6–0	UEFA Women's Euro 2017 qualifying
4	27 June 2025	Serbian FA Sports Center, Stara Pazova, Serbia	Serbia	3–0	3–1	Friendly

== Honours ==
Þór/KA

- Úrvalsdeild kvenna: 2012, 2017
- Icelandic Women's Super Cup: 2013
- Icelandic Women's Cup runner-up: 2013

Individual

- Úrvalsdeild kvenna Player of the Year: 2018
