= Haukar (women's football) =

- Full name: Knattspyrnufélagið Haukar
- Ground: Ásvellir, Hafnarfjörður, Iceland
- Capacity: 2,120
- Head Coach: Jakob Leó Bjarnason
- League: 1. deild kvenna
- 2024: ▲1st in 2. deild kvenna
- Website: http://www.haukar.is/knattspyrna/
Home colours	Away colours

The Haukar women's football team is the women's football department of the Haukar multi-sport club. It is based in Hafnarfjörður, Iceland, and currently plays in the 1. deild kvenna, the second-tier women's football league in Iceland, after being relegated from Úrvalsdeild kvenna in 2017.

== Trophies ==
- 1. deild kvenna
  - Winner: 1985, 1996, 2009, 2016, 2023
