= HK/Víkingur =

- Founded: 2001
- Dissolved: 2019
- Ground: Kórinn; Víkingsvöllur

HK/Víkingur was a women's football team located in Iceland. It was a joint team of Handknattleiksfélag Kópavogs and Víkingur Reykjavík. The collaboration started in 2001 and played four times in the top-tier Úrvalsdeild kvenna, won the 1. deild kvenna twice and played five times in the finals of the 1. deild kvenna. After the 2019 season, the teams decided to end their eighteen years of collaboration.

== Titles ==
- 1. deild kvenna: 2007, 2017
