= Þór/KA =

Icelandic women's football club

Þór/KA (Thor/KA)
- Full name: Þór/KA
- Short name: Þór/KA
- Founded: 1993 (as ÍBA); 1999 (as Þór/KA)
- Dissolved: 2026
- Ground: Þórsvöllur, Akureyri, Iceland
- Capacity: 2,948 (948 seats)
- 2026: Úrvalsdeild kvenna, 8th
- Website: https://www.thorka.is
Home colours	Away colours

Þór/KA was an Icelandic women's football team based in Akureyri. It was a joint team fielded by Þór Akureyri and Knattspyrnufélag Akureyrar (KA). The team won the Icelandic championship twice, in 2012 and 2017. Following the 2026 season, KA announced that they would not renew the 34 year collaboration.

== History ==
The collaboration between Þór Akureyri and KA started in 1993 when the clubs sent a joint team under the name Íþróttabandalags Akureyrar (ÍBA). In 1999 the joint team played for the first time under the name Þór/KA in the Iceland's top tier Úrvalsdeild kvenna. Knattspyrnufélag Siglufjarðar joined the collaboration in 2001 and subsequently the team was named Þór/KA/KS until KS left the collaboration after 2005 season. In 2006 the team finished 7th of 8 teams, 8th/9 in 2007, the reaching a good 4th/10 in 2008 and then bettering those results with 3rd/10 in 2009 and a second-place finish in 2010. As Iceland was in the top 8 leagues of UEFA, those second place was enough to qualify for the 2011–12 UEFA Women's Champions League. The team entered in the round of 32 but lost 14–2 on aggregate to German team Turbine Potsdam.

In 2010 the team also went to the semi-finals in the Icelandic cup, losing to the eventual winner Valur. In 2013 they lost the cup final.

In 2012 Þór/KA finished first in the Úrvalsdeild and secured its first ever Icelandic championship.

Prior to the 2017 season, KA declared that it was going to end the collaboration and field its own women's team. The decision was highly criticised, including by Þór's chairman, team captain Karen Nóadóttir and star player Sandra María Jessen. In March, KA reversed its decision and struck a deal with Þór to continue the collaboration until at least to the end of the 2019 season.

On September 29, 2017, the club secured its second national championship by defeating FH, in the last game of the season, 2–0 with goals from Sandra Jessen and Sandra Stephany Mayor.

On April 24, Þór/KA won the 2018 League Cup. On April 29, they won the Icelandic Super Cup, defeating ÍBV women's football 3–0 with goals from Sandra Stephany Mayor and Margrét Árnadóttir.

On 23 November 2018, the teams announced that they agreed to continue the collaboration until at least to the end of the 2023 season.

The team finished 8th during the 2026 season. Following the sesson, KA announced that they would not renew the 34 year collaboration. KA's team would start the following season in the third tier 2. deild kvenna while Þór Akureyri would keep the Besta deild kvenna seat.

== Trophies and achievements ==
- Úrvalsdeild kvenna (Premier League):
  - 2012, 2017
- Icelandic Women's Football Cup:
  - Runner-up: 1989^{1}, 2013
- Super Cup :
  - 2013, 2018
- League Cup :
  - 2009, 2018
  - B-division: 2004, 2006, 2007, 2008
- Icelandic Division I :
  - 1983^{1}, 1992^{2}, 1994 (as ÍBA), 1999, 2005
1. As Þór Akureyri
2. As KA

== Players ==
=== Current squad ===
Note: Flags indicate national team as defined under FIFA eligibility rules; some limited exceptions apply. Players may hold more than one non-FIFA nationality.

No.	Pos.	Nation	Player
1	GK	ISL	Harpa Jóhannsdóttir
2	DF	ISL	Angela Mary Helgadóttir
3	DF	ISL	Kolfinna Eik Elínardóttir
4	FW	USA	Ellie Moreno
5	MF	ISL	Steingerður Snorradóttir
6	DF	ISL	Hildur Anna Birgisdóttir
7	FW	ISL	Amalía Árnadóttir
8	MF	ISL	Kimberley Dóra Hjálmarsdóttir
9	MF	ISL	Karen María Sigurgeirsdóttir
10	FW	ISL	Sandra María Jessen
13	FW	ISL	Sonja Björg Sigurðardóttir
14	FW	ISL	Margrét Árnadóttir
16	DF	ISL	Eva Rut Ásþórsdóttir
17	MF	ISL	Emelía Ósk Kruger
18	FW	ISL	Bríet Jóhannsdóttir
19	DF	ISL	Agnes Birta Stefánsdóttir
20	GK	USA	Jessica Berlin
21	DF	ISL	Krista Dís Kristinsdóttir
22	DF	ISL	Hulda Ósk Jónsdóttir
23	MF	ISL	Briet Fjóla Bjarnadóttir
24	DF	ISL	Hulda Björg Hannesdóttir
27	DF	ISL	Henríetta Ágústsdóttir
48		ISL	Ísey Ragnarsdóttir
50		ISL	Emelía Blöndal Ásgeirsdóttir
66		ISL	Eva S. Dolina-Sokolowska
—		ISL	Bríet Kolbrún Hinriksdóttir
—	DF	USA	Libby Moore
