= Berglind Björg Þorvaldsdóttir =

Icelandic footballer (born 1992)

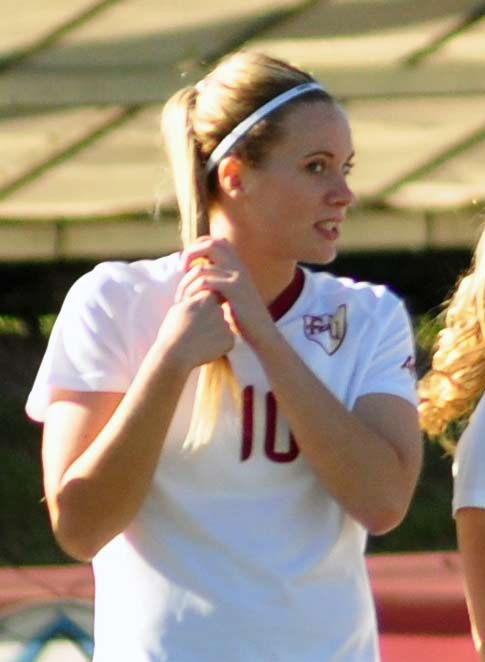
- Þorvaldsdóttir with Florida State Seminoles in 2013

Personal information
- Date of birth: 18 January 1992 (age 34)
- Place of birth: Vestmannaeyjar, Iceland
- Height: 1.75 m (5 ft 9 in)
- Position: Forward

Team information
- Current team: Valur
- Number: 92

Youth career
- Breiðablik

College career
Years	Team	Apps	(Gls)
2012–2016	Florida State Seminoles	72	(27)

Senior career*
Years	Team	Apps	(Gls)
2007–2010	Breiðablik	55	(28)
2011–2012	ÍBV	29	(16)
2013–2014	Breiðablik	16	(7)
2015–2016	Fylkir	20	(16)
2016–2017	Breiðablik	26	(23)
2017	Hellas Verona	8	(4)
2018–2020	Breiðablik	44	(47)
2019	→ PSV (loan)	9	(1)
2020	→ AC Milan (loan)	5	(5)
2020–2021	Le Havre	18	(5)
2021	Hammarby	8	(1)
2022	Brann	7	(1)
2022–2024	Paris Saint-Germain	1	(0)
2024–	Valur	13	(4)

International career^{‡}
2008	Iceland U16	4	(1)
2007–2008	Iceland U17	9	(10)
2008–2011	Iceland U19	25	(17)
2010–	Iceland	72	(12)
- * Club domestic league appearances and goals as of 04:43, 28 December 2025 (UTC) ‡ National team caps and goals as of 21 February 2023

Berglind Björg Þorvaldsdóttir (born 18 January 1992), commonly anglicised as Berglind Björg Thorvalsdottir, is an Icelandic professional footballer who plays as a forward for Besta deild kvenna club Valur and the Iceland national team.

== Club career ==
A prolific goal scorer since youth, Berglind Björg started her professional career at Breiðablik in the Úrvalsdeild kvenna, the women's football top-tier league in Iceland. In 2011, she moved to ÍBV, spending two seasons with the team. From August 2012 until June 2016, Berglind Björg attended the Florida State University in the United States. During this period, she divided her time between playing for Florida State Seminoles and brief stints playing for professional clubs in her native country: first with Breiðablik (2013 and 2014) and later with Fylkir (2015 and 2016). In July 2016, Berglind Björg definitively returned home to play again for Breiðablik. In September 2017, Berglind Björg left Iceland to play for Italy's Serie A club Verona. She had played five matches for the team when the season was halted due to the COVID-19 pandemic.

On 25 August 2022, Paris Saint-Germain announced the signing of Berglind Björg on a two-year deal until June 2024. On 26 April 2024, she left the club on a mutual consent.

== International career ==
Berglind Björg debuted for Iceland U17 on 17 September 2007, in a match against Latvia for the 2008 UEFA Women's Under-17 Championship. She participated in all the six matches Iceland played in the competition. Berglind Björg also represented Iceland at the 2009 UEFA Women's Under-17 Championship. On 24 April 2008 she started to play for the Iceland U19 team. Her first match was against Belgium in the 2008 UEFA Women's Under-19 Championship Qualification. She also represented Iceland at the 2009 UEFA Women's Under-19 Championship, 2010 UEFA Women's Under-19 Championship Qualifying Rounds and 2011 UEFA Women's Under-19 Championship Qualifying Rounds.

In 2010, Berglind Björg was called for the 2010 Algarve Cup and debuted in Iceland's first match in the competition on February 24 against the United States. She also represented Iceland at the 2011 Algarve Cup, the 2016 Algarve Cup (when Iceland finished third) and the 2017 Algarve Cup. On 6 April 2017, in a match against Slovakia, she scored her first international goal. On 22 June 2017 she was included by coach Freyr Alexandersson in the squad that represented Iceland at the UEFA Women's Euro 2017.

== Personal life ==
Berglind is the sister of international footballer Gunnar Heiðar Þorvaldsson.

== Career statistics ==
=== International ===
As of match played 21 February 2023

Appearances and goals by national team and year
National team	Year	Apps	Goals
Iceland	2010	6	0
Iceland	2011	1	0
Iceland	2012	0	0
Iceland	2013	0	0
Iceland	2014	0	0
Iceland	2015	2	0
Iceland	2016	10	0
Iceland	2017	11	2
Iceland	2018	4	0
Iceland	2019	10	2
Iceland	2020	4	2
Iceland	2021	9	3
Iceland	2022	12	3
Iceland	2023	3	0
Total		72	12

Scores and results list Iceland's goal tally first, score column indicates score after each Berglind Björg goal.

List of international goals scored by Berglind Björg Þorvaldsdóttir
No.	Date	Venue	Opponent	Score	Result	Competition
1	6 April 2017	NTC Senec, Senec, Slovakia	Slovakia	2–0	2–0	Friendly
2	18 September 2017	Laugardalsvöllur, Reykjavík, Iceland	Faroe Islands	7–0	8–0	2019 FIFA Women's World Cup qualification
3	6 April 2019	Yongin Mireu Stadium, Yongin, South Korea	South Korea	1–0	3–2	Friendly
4	6 April 2019	Yongin Mireu Stadium, Yongin, South Korea	South Korea	2–0	3–2	Friendly
5	26 November 2020	NTC Senec, Senec, Slovakia	Slovakia	1–1	3–1	UEFA Women's Euro 2022 qualification
6	1 December 2020	Szusza Ferenc Stadion, Budapest, Hungary	Hungary	1–0	1–0	UEFA Women's Euro 2022 qualification
7	15 June 2021	Laugardalsvöllur, Reykjavík, Iceland	Republic of Ireland	1–0	2–0	Friendly
8	25 November 2021	Yanmar Stadion, Almere, Netherlands	Japan	2–0	2–0	Friendly
9	30 November 2021	AEK Arena – Georgios Karapatakis, Larnaca, Cyprus	Cyprus	2–0	4–0	2023 FIFA Women's World Cup qualification
10	7 April 2022	Voždovac Stadium, Belgrade, Serbia	Belarus	3–0	5–0	2023 FIFA Women's World Cup qualification
11	29 June 2022	Stadion Dyskobolii Grodzisk Wielkopolski, Grodzisk Wielkopolski, Poland	Poland	1–1	3–1	Friendly
12	10 July 2022	Academy Stadium, Manchester, England	Belgium	1–0	1–1	UEFA Women's Euro 2022
