= Grindavík (women's football) =

- Full name: Ungmennafélag Grindavíkur
- Ground: Grindavíkurvöllur
- Chairman: Jónas Karl Þórhallsson
- Manager: Róbert Haraldsson
- League: Úrvalsdeild kvenna
- 2017: 7th
- Website: http://www.umfg.is/umfg/fotbolti
Home colours	Away colours

The Grindavík women's football team, commonly known as Grindavík or UMFG, is the women's football department of the Ungmennafélag Grindavíkur multi-sport club. It is based in Grindavík, Iceland, and currently plays in the Úrvalsdeild kvenna, the top-tier women's football league in Iceland.
