= 1. deild kvenna (football) =

Women's football league

- Founded: 1955 (as 2. deild kvenna); 1982 (as 1. deild kvenna)
- First season: Víðir (1982)
- Country: Iceland
- Confederation: UEFA
- Divisions: 1
- Number of clubs: 10
- Level on pyramid: 2
- Promotion to: Besta deild kvenna
- Relegation to: 2. deild kvenna
- Domestic cup(s): Bikarkeppni kvenna Deildabikar Women
- Current champions: ÍBV (2025)
- Most championships: Haukar, Þróttur R. (4 titles)
- Website: Official website
- Current: 2026 1. deild kvenna

1. deild kvenna, also known as Lengjudeild kvenna (English: The Lengja League) for sponsorship reasons, is the second-tier women's football league in Iceland. The league was founded in 1982. ÍBV were the 2025 league's champions. The league features 10 teams; the top two finishers qualify for promotion to the Besta deild kvenna, while the bottom two are relegated to 2. deild kvenna. Two teams are relegated from the bottom group of the top-tier Besta deild kvenna to this league, and the top two teams from 2. deild kvenna are promoted into this league.

== Champions ==
The list of all champions:

- 1982: Víðir
- 1983: Þór
- 1984: ÍBK
- 1985: Haukar
- 1986: Stjarnan
- 1987: Fram
- 1988: Breiðablik
- 1989: BÍ
- 1990: Þróttur Neskaupstað
- 1991: Stjarnan
- 1992: KA
- 1993: Höttur
- 1994: ÍBA
- 1995: Afturelding
- 1996: Haukar
- 1997: Reynir Sandgerði
- 1998: Grindavík
- 1999: Þór/KA
- 2000: Grindavík
- 2001: Þróttur Reykjavík
- 2002: Þróttur Reykjavík
- 2003: Fjölnir
- 2004: Keflavík
- 2005: Fylkir
- 2006: Fjölnir
- 2007: HK/Víkingur
- 2008: ÍR
- 2009: Haukar
- 2010: ÍBV
- 2011: FH
- 2012: Þróttur Reykjavík
- 2013: Fylkir
- 2014: KR
- 2015: ÍA
- 2016: Haukar
- 2017: HK/Víkingur
- 2018: Fylkir
- 2019: Þróttur R.
- 2020: UMF Tindastóll
- 2021: KR
- 2022: FH
- 2023: Víkingur R.
- 2024: Fjardabyggd/Höttur/Leiknir
- 2025: ÍBV

=== By club ===
Club	Titles	Years
Haukar	4	1985, 1996, 2009, 2016
Þróttur R.	4	2001, 2002, 2012, 2019
Fylkir	3	2005, 2013, 2018
Fjölnir	2	2003, 2006
Grindavík	2	1998, 2000
Stjarnan	2	1986, 1991
HK/Víkingur	2	2007, 2017
FH	2	2011, 2022
Keflavík, ÍBK (Note: Keflavík Sports Federation (Íþróttabandalag Keflavíkur, ÍBK) became Keflavík Sports and Youth Club (Keflavík, íþrótta- og ungmennafélag) in 1994.)	2	1984, 2004
KR	2	2014, 2021
ÍBV	2	2010, 2025
Afturelding	1	1995
BÍ	1	1989
Breiðablik	1	1988
Fram	1	1987
Höttur	1	1993
ÍA	1	2015
ÍBA	1	1994
ÍR	1	2008
KA (Note: Þór Akureyri and Knattspyrnufélag Akureyrar formed a separate joint team, Þór/KA, in 1999.)	1	1992
Reynir S.	1	1997
UMF Tindastóll	1	2020
Víkingur R.	1	2023
Víðir	1	1982
Þór/KA	1	1999
Þór	1	1983
Þróttur N.	1	1990

== See also ==
- 1. deild karla (men's football league)
