= Hásteinsvöllur =

Stadium in Vestmannaeyjar, Iceland

Coordinates: 63°26′21.89″N 20°17′16.62″W

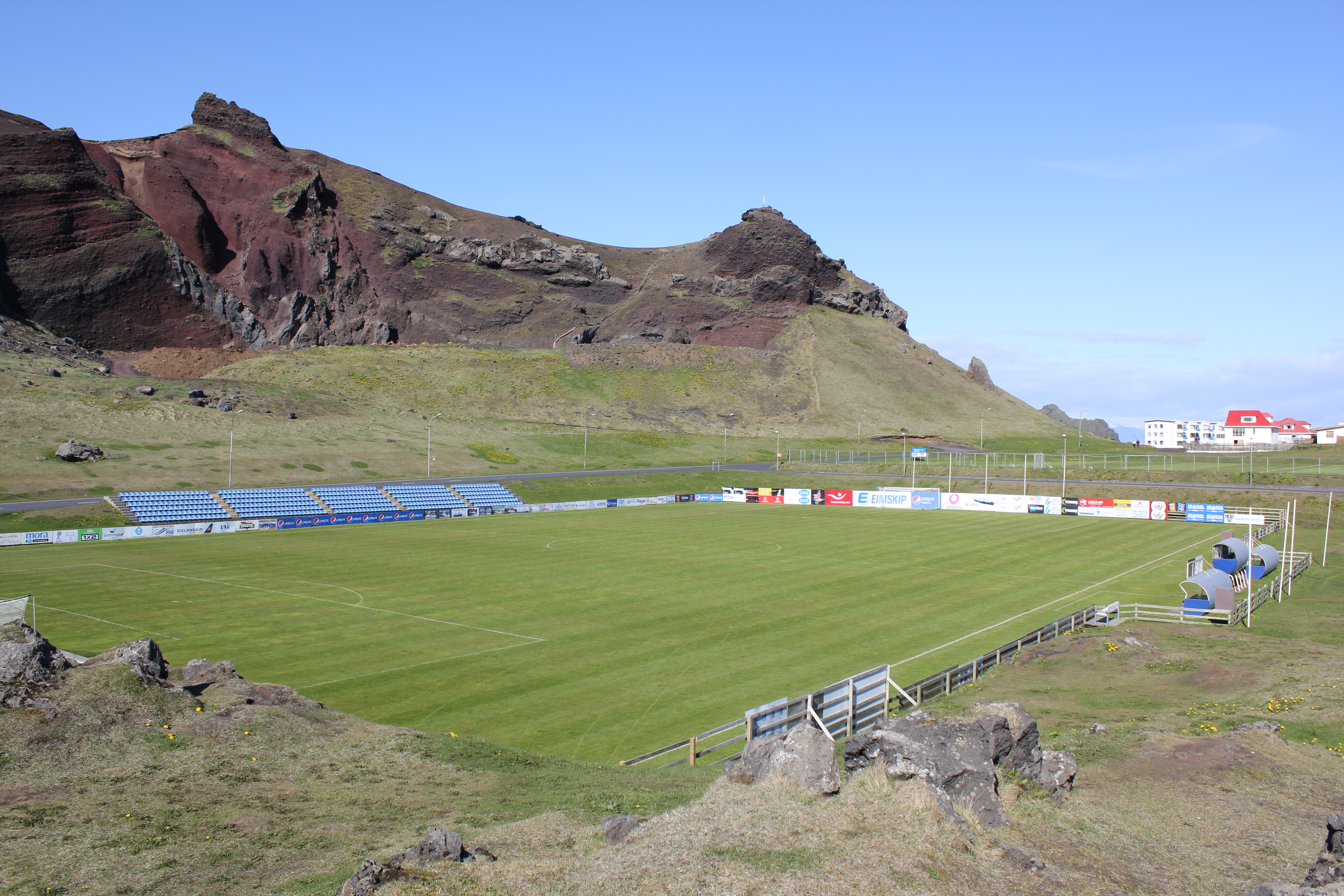
- Interactive map of Hásteinsvöllur
- Location: Vestmannaeyjar, Iceland
- Owner: ÍBV
- Capacity: 2,300 (534 seated)
- Surface: Grass

Construction
- Opened: 1912
- Renovated: 1922, 1960, 2012

Tenant
- ÍBV

Hásteinsvöllur (Icelandic pronunciation: [ˈhauːˌsteinsˌvœtlʏr̥], lit. 'Hásteinn Field' or more precisely 'Hásteinn Stadium') is a multi-use stadium in Vestmannaeyjar, Iceland. It is located in the town of Vestmannaeyjar on the island of Heimaey. It is used mostly for football matches, and is the home ground of Íþróttabandalag Vestmannaeyja (ÍBV). The stadium's capacity is 2,834.

The stadium is named after the imposing rock Hásteinn, which it is located at the foot of. "Hásteinn" means "high rock" in Icelandic.

In January 2012, ÍBV announced plans to install 700 additional seats in time for the first game of the summer of 2012 against Breiðablik. The estimated cost of the additional seating is 40 million ISK (315,000 USD).

In 2017, it was named as one of the Top 10 Most Beautiful Sporting Arenas by the BBC. In April 2021 the website 90min.com rated Hásteinsvöllur, 14th best looking stadium in the world.
