= FH (women's football) =

- Full name: Fimleikafélag Hafnarfjarðar
- Nickname: FH-ingar
- Short name: FH
- Ground: Kaplakriki, Hafnarfjörður, Iceland
- Capacity: 6,500 (3,050 seats)
- Chairman: Valdimar Svavarsson
- Manager: Guðni Eiríksson
- League: Besta deild kvenna
- 2025: 2nd
- Website: http://www.fh.is
Home colours	Away colours

The Fimleikafélag Hafnarfjarðar women's football team is the women's football department of the Fimleikafélag Hafnarfjarðar multi-sport club. It is based in Hafnarfjörður, Iceland, and currently plays in the Besta deild kvenna, the top-tier women's football league in Iceland.

== History ==
FH's women's football team won the first edition of the national championship in 1972. After losing the title to Ármann in 1973, FH won three successive titles in 1974, 1975 and 1976. The club was promoted from the second-tier 1. deild in 2015, and finished sixth in the 2016 Úrvalsdeild.

=== Current squad ===
As of 6 May 2020.

Note: Flags indicate national team as defined under FIFA eligibility rules; some limited exceptions apply. Players may hold more than one non-FIFA nationality.

No.	Pos.	Nation	Player
1	GK	ISL	Aníta Dögg Guðmundsdóttir
2	DF	ISL	Hrafnhildur Hauksdóttir
3	MF	ISL	Lilja Gunnarsdóttir
4	DF	ISL	Ingibjörg Rún Óladóttir
5	DF	ISL	Elisa Sigurjónsdóttir
7	DF	ISL	Erna Guðrún Magnúsdóttir
9	FW	ISL	Rannveig Bjarnadóttir
10	MF	ISL	Selma Dögg Björgvinsdóttir

No.	Pos.	Nation	Player
13	DF	ISL	Melkorka Katrín Fl Pétursdóttir
15	MF	ISL	Birta Stefánsdóttir
16	MF	ISL	Tinna Sól Þórsdóttir
17	FW	USA	Maddy Gonzalez
22	MF	ISL	Lovisa Maria Hermannsdótir
24	DF	USA	Taylor Sekyra
—	MF	ISL	Svanhildur Yifa Dagbjartsdóttir

== Honours ==
=== League ===
- Úrvalsdeild kvenna
  - Winners (4): 1972, 1974, 1975, 1976
- 1. deild kvenna
  - Winners (1): 2015
