= ÍBV (women's football) =

- Full name: Íþróttabandalag Vestmannaeyja
- Short name: ÍBV
- Founded: 1993; 32 years ago
- Ground: Hásteinsvöllur; Vestmannaeyjar, Iceland
- Capacity: 2300 (534 seated)
- Manager: Jón Óli Daníelsson
- League: Besta deild kvenna
- 2022: 6th
| Home colours | Away colours |

The ÍBV women's football team is the women's football department of the ÍBV-íþróttafélag (English: ÍBV sports club) multi-sport club. It is based in Vestmannaeyjar, Iceland, and currently plays in the Besta deild kvenna, the top-tier women's football league in Iceland. The team plays its home games at the Hásteinsvöllur. ÍBV has won the Icelandic Cup twice, in 2004 and 2017.

== History ==
ÍBV women's team first played in 1993, in the Icelandic second-tier 1. deild kvenna (then named 2. deild kvenna) but folded after five games. The team was back the next season and in 1996 it was promoted to Úrvalsdeild kvenna. The team folded after the 2004 season but was resurrected in 2007 when it participated in the Icelandic cup. In 2008 they participated again in 1. deild kvenna and in 2010 they won the league and got promoted back to Úrvalsdeild kvenna. In 2017 the team won its second Icelandic Cup after beating Stjarnan 3-2 in extra time. In November 2018, the club hired Jón Óli Daníelsson as its manager, replacing Ian Jeffs who joined the Icelandic women's national football team as an assistant manager.

== Trophies ==
- 1. deild kvenna
  - Winner: 2010
- Icelandic cup
  - Winner: 2004, 2017
- Icelandic Super Cup
  - Winner: 2012

=== Former players ===
For details of current and former players with a Wikipedia article, see Category:ÍBV women's football players. They include:

- Miyah Watford in the 2020 season.

== Managers ==
- (Iceland) Sveinn Sveinsson (1993)
- (Poland) Miroslaw Mojsiuszko (1994–1995)
- (Iceland) Sigurlás Þorleifsson (1996–1998)
- (Iceland) Heimir Hallgrímsson (1999–2001)
- (Iceland) Elísabet Gunnarsdóttir (2002)
- (Scotland) Michelle Barr (2002)
- (Iceland) Heimir Hallgrímsson (2003–2004)
- (Iceland) Jón Ólafur Daníelsson (2007–2014)
- (England) Ian Jeffs (2015–2018)
- (Iceland) Jón Óli Daníelsson (2018–2019)
- (Iceland) Andri Ólafsson (2020)
- (England) Ian Jeffs (2021)
- (Trinidad and Tobago) Jonathan Glenn (2022)
