= 2024 Icelandic Women's Football Cup =

Icelandic women's football tournament season

2024 Bikarkeppni
Tournament details
- Country: Iceland
- Dates: 20 April 2024 – 16 August 2024
- Teams: 33

Final positions
- Champions: Valur (15th title)
- Runners-up: Breiðablik

Tournament statistics
- Matches played: 32
- Goals scored: 145 (4.53 per match)
- Top goal scorer(s): (Iceland) Dröfn Einarsdóttir (5 goals)
- All statistics correct as of 16 August 2024. Goals scored in penalty shoot-outs not included.

The 2024 Bikarkeppni, also known as Mjólkurbikar due to sponsorship reasons, was the 44th edition of Icelandic domestic women's cup competition.

The 2024 edition started with the first round on 20 April 2024 and the final match was played on 16 August 2024 at Reykjavík's Laugardalsvöllur. Valur have been crowned champions of the 2024 season after besting Breiðablik in the final 2 to 1. Their 15th title.

Víkingur R., the defending champions following their first trophy in the 2023 season, were eliminated in the third round.

== Teams ==
Besta deild	1. deild	2. deild
The 10 teams in the 2024 season.	The 10 teams in the 2024 season.	The 13 teams in the 2024 season.
Breiðablik; FH; Fylkir; Keflavík; Stjarnan; Tindastóll; Þór/KA; Þróttur R.; Valur; Víkingur R.	Afturelding; FHL; Fram Reykjavík; Grindavík; Grótta; HK Kópavogur; ÍA Akranes; ÍBV; ÍR Reykjavík; Selfoss	Álftanes; Augnablik; Dalvík/Reynir; Einherji; Fjölnir; Haukar; ÍH Hafnarfjörður; KH; KR; Njarðvík (Note: Njarðvík is not a 2024 2. deild competitor, but appears in the roster in place of Vestri.); Sindri; Smári; Völsungur

== Round 1 ==
20 April 2024	Dalvík/Reynir	0–3	Einherji	Dalvíkurvöllur, Dalvík
14:00 CEST (UTC+2)		Report	Hafsteinsdóttir 61'; Jónsdóttir 73'; Ion 90+1'	Referee: Sveinn Arnarsson

20 April 2024	Haukar	2–0	ÍR Reykjavík	BIRTU völlurinn, Hafnarfjörður
14:00 CEST (UTC+2)	Svansdóttir 50'; unknown player	Report		Referee: Ronnarong Wongmahadthai

21 April 2024	Fjölnir	8–0	Sindri	Egilshöll, Reykjavík
13:00 CEST (UTC+2)	Atladóttir 3', 10'; Baldvinsdóttir 8', 50'; Aradóttir 26'; Victoriudóttir 64'; Magnúsdóttir 67', 75'	Report		Attendance: 40; Referee: Przemyslaw Janik

21 April 2024	Njarðvík	0–10	ÍH Hafnarfjörður	Nettóhöllin, Keflavík
14:00 CEST (UTC+2)		Report	Magnúsdóttir 6', 20', 34'; Helgadóttir 12', 43'; Traustadóttir 47', 68', 79'; Sæþórsdóttir 74'; Ólafsdóttir 84'	Referee: Brynjar Þór Elvarsson

21 April 2024	Völsungur	1–2	FHL	PCC völlurinn, Húsavík
14:00 CEST (UTC+2)	Kristjánsdóttir 34'	Report	Hawkins 17', 23'	Attendance: 55; Referee: Bergvin Fannar Gunnarsson

21 April 2024	Augnablik	0–5	Fram Reykjavík	Kópavogsvöllur, Kópavogur
15:00 CEST (UTC+2)		Report	Tiernan 3', 45+1'; Ólafsdóttir 13', 24', 59'	Attendance: 90; Referee: Patryk Emanuel Jurczak

21 April 2024	Smári	0–9	Grindavík	Fagrilundur, Kópavogur
15:00 CEST (UTC+2)		Report	Á. Einarsdóttir 2'; Jónsdóttir 11'; D. Einarsdóttir 32', 38', 48', 61', 74'; Goodwill 48'; Unnarsdóttir 50'	Attendance: 75; Referee: Bjarni Víðir Pálmason

22 April 2024	KR	2–0	Álftanes	KR-völlur, Reykjavík
18:00 CEST (UTC+2)	Grétarsdóttir 56'; Kristjánsdóttir 90'	Report		Referee: Ágúst Hjalti Tómasson

22 April 2024	Afturelding	4–0	KH	Malbikstöðin að Varmá, Mosfellsbær
19:15 CEST (UTC+2)	Gunnarsdóttir 17', 70', 90+3'; Kvaran 80'	Report		Attendance: 50; Referee: Hallgrímur Viðar Arnarson

22 April 2024	ÍA Akranes	5–4 (a.e.t.)	Selfoss	Akraneshöllin, Akranes
19:15 CEST (UTC+2)	Paoletti 75', 84'; Schwartzenberger 76'; Elíasdóttir 90+1', 94'	Report	Bergsdóttir 4'; Halldórsdóttir 22'; Ágústsdóttir 45'; Friðgeirsdóttir 90'	Referee: Bríet Bragadóttir

23 April 2024	HK Kópavogur	1–1 (a.e.t.) (3–4 p)	Grótta	Kórinn, Kópavogur
18:30 CEST (UTC+2)	Óladóttir 85'	Report	Búadóttir 73'	Attendance: 80; Referee: Steinar Stephensen

== Round 2 ==
ÍBV were given a bye in the first round as the team relegated from Besta deild in the 9th place.

30 April 2024	Haukar	2–3	Grótta	BIRTU völlurinn, Hafnarfjörður
17:30 CEST (UTC+2)	Aðalgeirsdóttir 13' (o.g.); Hjaltadóttir 58'	Report	Amano 31'; Davíðsdóttir Scheving 45+1'; Jónasdóttir 53'	Attendance: 42; Referee: Bergrós Lilja Unudóttir

1 May 2024	Fram Reykjavík	5–1	ÍH Hafnarfjörður	Lambhagavöllurinn, Reykjavík
12:00 CEST (UTC+2)	Eyþórsdóttir 2'; Ólafsdóttir 36'; Tiernan 48'; Harðardóttir 49'; Stefánsdóttir 84'	Report	Bjarnadóttir 83'	Referee: Bergrós Lilja Unudóttir

1 May 2024	Einherji	0–5	FHL	Greifavöllurinn, Akureyri
13:30 CEST (UTC+2)		Report	Jónsdóttir 55'; Hawkins 59'; Smith 77', 90+1'; Salas 85'	Attendance: 30; Referee: Bergvin Fannar Gunnarsson

1 May 2024	Fjölnir	0–1	ÍA Akranes	Egilshöll, Reykjavík
14:00 CEST (UTC+2)		Report	Sigurðardóttir 83'	Referee: Ásmundur Þór Sveinsson

1 May 2024	ÍBV	1–2 (a.e.t.)	Afturelding	Hásteinsvöllur, Vestmannaeyjar
14:00 CEST (UTC+2)	Sevcova 23'	Report	Lewis 54'; Heiðarsdóttir 108'	Referee: Sigurður Schram

1 May 2024	Grindavík	2–1	KR	Víkingsvöllur, Reykjavík
16:00 CEST (UTC+2)	Young 40'; Jónsdóttir 70'	Report	Grétarsdóttir 49'	Attendance: 332; Referee: Sindri Snær A van Kasteren

== Round 3 ==
The pairings for the third round were drawn on 3 May 2024. The 2024 Besta deild teams entered the competition in this round.

18 May 2024	Tindastóll	1–2	Þór/KA	Dalvíkurvöllur, Dalvík
12:00 CEST (UTC+2)	Rhodes 29'	Report	Sigurgeirsdóttir 34'; Jónsdóttir 44'	Attendance: 80; Referee: Gunnar Freyr Róbertsson

18 May 2024	Grindavík	2–2 (a.e.t.) (4–3 p)	ÍA Akranes	Stakkavíkurvöllur-Safamýri, Reykjavík
14:00 CEST (UTC+2)	Einarsdóttir 41', 79'	Report	Elíasdóttir 57'; Schwartzenberger 90+3'	Attendance: 200; Referee: Aðalbjörn Heiðar Þorsteinsson

18 May 2024	Grótta	1–3	Keflavík	Vivaldivöllurinn, Seltjarnarnes
14:00 CEST (UTC+2)	Arnarsdóttir 55'	Report	Magnúsdóttir 11'; Rendeiro 38'; Miller 89'	Referee: Stefán Ragnar Guðlaugsson

19 May 2024	Afturelding	1–0	Víkingur R.	Malbikstöðin að Varmá, Mosfellsbær
14:00 CEST (UTC+2)	Gunnarsdóttir 8'	Report		Attendance: 70; Referee: Guðni Páll Kristjánsson

19 May 2024	Valur	8–0	Fram Reykjavík	N1-völlurinn Hlíðarenda, Reykjavík
14:00 CEST (UTC+2)	Cousins 15'; Björgvinsdóttir 23', 34'; Friðriksdóttir 36'; Tryggvadóttir 44'; Andradóttir 47', 69', 78'	Report		Referee: Brynjar Þór Elvarsson

19 May 2024	FH	3–2	FHL	Kaplakrikavöllur, Hafnarfjörður
14:30 CEST (UTC+2)	Jörundsdóttir 12'; Hermannsdóttir 69'; Snæfeld Hauksdóttir 79'	Report	Sandoval 35'; Smith 67'	Attendance: 36; Referee: Bergrós Lilja Unudóttir

19 May 2024	Þróttur R.	5–0	Fylkir	AVIS völlurinn, Reykjavík
16:00 CEST (UTC+2)	Lelii 25'; Eyjólfsdóttir 34'; Antonsdóttir 45+2'; Þorvarðardóttir 64'; Guðmundsdóttir 90+4'	Report		Referee: Hreinn Magnússon

19 May 2024	Stjarnan	3–4 (a.e.t.)	Breiðablik	Samsungvöllurinn, Garðabær
19:30 CEST (UTC+2)	Cosme 25'; Pálsdóttir 57'; Arnarsdóttir 88'	Report	Georgsdóttir 1'; Árnadóttir 22'; Albertsdóttir 55', 100'	Attendance: 107; Referee: Bríet Bragadóttir

== Round 4 (quarter-finals) ==
The pairings for the quarter-finals were drawn on 21 May 2024.

11 June 2024	FH	0–1	Þór/KA	Kaplakrikavöllur, Hafnarfjörður
17:15 CEST (UTC+2)		Report	Jessen 48'	Attendance: 125; Referee: Twana Khalid Ahmed

11 June 2024	Breiðablik	5–2	Keflavík	Kópavogsvöllur, Kópavogur
19:15 CEST (UTC+2)	Ásbjörnsdóttir 2', 64' (pen.); Nurmi 10'; Gísladóttir 18'; Kristjánsdóttir 90'	Report	Rendeiro 54'; Miller 90+3'	Attendance: 157; Referee: Gunnar Oddur Hafliðason

11 June 2024	Grindavík	0–6	Valur	Stakkavíkurvöllur-Safamýri, Reykjavík
19:15 CEST (UTC+2)		Report	Tryggvadóttir 15'; Atladóttir 38', 57'; Ingadóttir 74', 83'; Ágústsdóttir 87'	Attendance: 108; Referee: Bríet Bragadóttir

11 June 2024	Afturelding	1–4	Þróttur R.	Malbikstöðin að Varmá, Mosfellsbær
20:00 CEST (UTC+2)	Steinarsdóttir 62' (o.g.)	Report	Pais 20' (pen.), 50', 58', 60'	Referee: Ásmundur Þór Sveinsson

== Round 5 (semi-finals) ==
The pairings for the semi-finals were drawn on 12 June 2024, immediately following the conclusion of the last quarter-final match.

28 June 2024	Þór/KA	1–2 (a.e.t.)	Breiðablik	VÍS völlurinn, Akureyri
19:45 CEST (UTC+2)	Jessen 105'	Report	Halldórsdóttir 99'; Gonzalez 113'	Attendance: 250; Referee: Gunnar Oddur Hafliðason

29 June 2024	Valur	3–0	Þróttur R.	N1-völlurinn Hlíðarenda, Reykjavík
13:00 CEST (UTC+2)	Björnsdóttir 7' (o.g.); Ingadóttir 45+1'; Eyjólfsdóttir 80' (o.g.)	Report		Attendance: 393; Referee: Arnar Þór Stefánsson

== Final ==
16 August 2024
19:15 CEST (UTC+2)

Valur	2–1	Breiðablik
Björgvinsdóttir 65'; Ingadóttir 81'	Report	Tómasdóttir 90+2'

Laugardalsvöllur, Reykjavík
Attendance: 1,451
Referee: Arnar Þór Stefánsson

== Top goalscorers ==
As of 16 August 2024

Rank	Player	Team	Goals
1	(Iceland) Dröfn Einarsdóttir	Grindavík	5
2	(Iceland) Jasmín Ingadóttir	Valur	4
2	(Iceland) Hildur Karítas Gunnarsdóttir	Afturelding	4
2	(Canada) Leah Maryann Pais	Þróttur R.	4
2	(Iceland) Alda Ólafsdóttir	Fram Reykjavík	4
6	(Iceland) Amanda Andradóttir	Valur	3
6	(Iceland) Guðrún Björgvinsdóttir	Valur	3
6	(Iceland) Erna Björt Elíasdóttir	ÍA Akranes	3
6	(United States) Emma Hawkins	FHL	3
6	(Iceland) Ingibjörg Magnúsdóttir	ÍH Hafnarfjörður	3
6	(United States) Samantha Smith	FHL	3
6	(United States) Murielle Tiernan	Fram Reykjavík	3
6	(Iceland) Aldís Tinna Traustadóttir	ÍH Hafnarfjörður	3
