= Football in Iceland =

- Country: Iceland
- Governing body: Football Association of Iceland
- National teams: men's national team women's national team

National competitions
- Icelandic Men's Cup; Icelandic Women's Cup; Icelandic Men's Football League Cup; Icelandic Women's Football League Cup; Icelandic Men's Football Super Cup

Club competitions
- Úrvalsdeild karla Besta deild kvenna Úrvalsdeild kvenna

International competitions
- Men's Champions League; Women's Champions League; Europa League; Super Cup; FIFA Club World Cup; FIFA World Cup (Men's National Team); Men's European Championship (Men's National Team); UEFA Nations League (Men's National Team); FIFA Women's World Cup (Women's National Team); Women's European Championship

Football is the most popular sport in Iceland. Approximately half of the people in Iceland are considered association football fans. Iceland hosted the U-18 European Championship in 1997, but an Icelandic national team has qualified for the final competition of a major tournament only five times—three times by the women's national team at UEFA Women's Euro in 2009, 2013 and 2017, and twice by the men's team at UEFA Euro 2016 and the 2018 FIFA World Cup. The only Iceland teams to advance past the group stage at a major tournament were the women in 2013 and the men in 2016.

Iceland's most famous football player is Eiður Guðjohnsen. He has won two Premier League titles with Chelsea F.C. as well as La Liga, Copa del Rey and the UEFA Champions League title for FC Barcelona.

There are 20,000 players (men and women) registered at clubs.

== The championship ==
For each championship, an official sponsor name or a name is given. The number of clubs participating in each level is defined in advance. At the end of each season, clubs finishing bottom of their division get relegated to a lower division (unless the clubs find themselves in the lowest division), and clubs finishing at the top of their division get promoted to a higher division. The club that ends the season at the top of the highest league will be national champion. The highest tier of Icelandic football is called Úrvalsdeild (lit. "selection division"), with the Úrvalsdeild karla for the men, and the Úrvalsdeild kvenna for the women.

== History of national competitions ==
- 1912: Creation of the national championship (Úrvalsdeild karla). Three clubs, two from Reykjavik and one from Vestmannaeyjar, take part in this inaugural edition. Knattspyrnufélag Reykjavíkur became the first team to register their name in the history.
- 1955: Establishment of the men's Second Division and the promotion and relegation system (1. deild karla champion takes the last place of Úrvalsdeild karla at the end of the season).
- 1966: Creation of the third national division (2. deild karla) that is fully regionalised.
- 1970: 1. deild karla (football) becomes a single national division rather than two regionalised groups.
- 1972: Creation of the women's national championship (Úrvalsdeild kvenna)
- 1977: Promotion and relegation in the men's leagues moves to two teams.
- 1982: Creation of the men's fourth national division (3. deild karla) with regional groups, 2. deild karla changes to only two regional groups. Creation of the women's second division 1. deild kvenna with regionalised groups and promotion and relegation system (1. deild kvenna champion takes the last place of Úrvalsdeild kvenna at the end of the season).
- 1984: Promotion and relegation in the women's leagues moves to two teams.
- 1990: 2. deild karla becomes a single national division rather than two regionalised groups.
- 2013: Reform of the pyramid scheme championships with the creation of a fifth division 4. deild karla, with the regional groups. 3. deild karla changes to a national league format.
- 2017: Creation of the women's third division 2. deild kvenna; all women's leagues move to a national format rather than a regionalised one.

== League system ==
=== Men's ===
Level	League(s) / Division(s)	
1	Icelandic Premier League; Besta-deildin - (Nationwide League); 12 clubs	
2	Icelandic First Division; Lengjudeild karla - (Nationwide League); 12 clubs	
3	Icelandic Second Division; 2. deild karla - (Nationwide League); 12 clubs	
4	Icelandic Third Division; 3. deild karla - (Nationwide League); 12 clubs	
5	Icelandic Fourth Division; 4. deild karla - (Nationwide League); 10 clubs	
6	Icelandic Fifth Division Group A 5. deild karla - (Nationwide League); 9 clubs	Icelandic Fifth Division Group B 5. deild karla - (Nationwide League); 9 clubs

=== Women's ===
Level	League(s) / Division(s)
1	Besta-deild kvenna (Nationwide League); 10 clubs
2	1. deild kvenna; (Nationwide League); 10 clubs
3	2. deild kvenna; (Nationwide League); 12 clubs as of 2022

== Other competitions ==
- Men's Icelandic Cup has been organized since 1960 and the Women's Icelandic Cup since 1981. They bring together the clubs of all divisions in the country and are played from May to October, with the final traditionally at the national stadium, Laugardalsvöllur. The winner of the men's cup qualifies for the UEFA Europa Conference League Qualifiers.
- The Icelandic Men's League Cup is a competition for clubs in the top two national divisions. Unlike the Icelandic Cup, it has a first group stage before ending with knockout matches from the quarterfinals. The Icelandic Women's League Cup is similar, but for only the top 6 clubs in the Besta-deild kvenna. A single group stage is used to qualify 4 clubs for knockout matches from semi-finals onwards. Both were formed in 1996.
- The Men's Super Cup/Women's Super Cup, played since 1969/1992, sees the champion of Úrvalsdeild and the cup winner in Iceland. This is traditionally the game that inaugurates the season before the championship began. If one club has won the Úrvalsdeild title and the cup, then they shall face the club the finished second in the league.

== Genesis of football in Iceland ==
Football arrived in Iceland at the end of the nineteenth century. The oldest club in the country, KR Reykjavik, was founded in 1899, and the first championship of Iceland, the Urvalsdeild, was held in 1912. It pitted three teams, KR Reykjavik, Fram Reykjavik and Íþróttabandalag Vestmannaeyja against each other. Until 1929, it was just these three clubs competing against each other with Fram Reykjavik winning ten titles, KR Reykjavik six and Víkingur Reykjavík two.

A majority of Icelandic clubs began to form at the end of the First World War and into the 1920s, including KR Reykjavik. One of the most prolific scorers in this division, Friðþjófur Thorsteinsson, was already playing abroad. In 1930, a fourth club of the capital, Reykjavik Valur, won its first championship.

During the 1930s, several foreign clubs came and played games on Icelandic soil. These matches were against some of the best clubs of the time (mostly against teams from England). The teams had started to tour Europe during this period, and it was during the first tour to the Faroe Islands in 1930 that takes place which can be likened to the first game of the Icelandic national team. Indeed, a selection of fifteen Icelandic players (two of them will follow one another at the head of the Federation twenty years later) made the trips to the neighboring island, first confronting a local club. The second match pits a selection of the best Faroese players. Albert Guðmundsson became the first professional footballer from Iceland.

== Women's football in Iceland ==
The first women's football team in Iceland was Fótboltafélagið Hvöt that was founded in 1914. However, public opinion meant that the early women's football did not last. Thoughts around the sport re-emerged in 1970, with consideration from KSÍ, the Football Association of Iceland, for it being public in the early half of the year. By the end of the year a friendly match would be organised between a selected XI from each of Reykjavík and Keflavík, with the capital team winning. The national league would form the next year, though only indoors at first, with the transition to the modern day outdoor league coming another year after, in 1972. Eight teams would participate in the inaugural season, though few of Iceland's traditional footballing heavyweights would participate at first, with the main expansion coming in 1982.

Today, the federation manages the national championship and the women's national team. Breiðablik UBK is the dominating women's football in Iceland, unlike its male counterpart (16 titles for the women versus one for the men). The national side played its first official game in 1981, though games were not regular at first and they did not play across 1988-1991. Even though they have never qualified for a World Cup, they have four consecutive appearances in the European Championship, where they have reached the quarterfinals in 1995 and 2013, being the smallest UEFA nations to qualify and to reach the knockout stages.

== Modern development ==
In 2012, the Icelandic Men's National Football Team were placed 122nd in the FIFA World Rankings. Since then, the team has risen nearly 88 spots in the rankings, entering UEFA Euro 2016 at #34 in the rankings. The team barely missed out on qualifying for the 2014 FIFA World Cup, falling in a playoff against Croatia, and qualified for Euro 2016, advancing to the quarterfinals. During their qualification campaign for the latter event, Strákarnir Okkar ("Our Boys") defeated the Czech Republic, the Netherlands, and Turkey at home, and also defeated the Netherlands away. The women's national team has also risen steadily in the FIFA Women's World Rankings, frequently appearing in the world top 20 in the 2010s, with a peak of 15th in 2011.

The country has risen to these previously unheard-of heights despite major challenges. As of 2016, the country's population of about 330,000 was comparable to that of Corpus Christi, Texas, and it had fewer registered football players (of both sexes) than the U.S. state of Rhode Island. Iceland, being a far northern country, also has to deal with average daily temperatures that stay around freezing for nearly half the year, making it difficult or impossible for players to train year-round outdoors.

The seeds for this rise were planted by the KSí in the mid-1990s, when it began discussions on how to overcome its challenges of population and climate. The initiative bore its first fruit in 2000, when KSí built the first of a series of domed football facilities known as "football houses" in Keflavík near the country's main international airport. Eventually, a total of 15 football houses were commissioned, some with full-sized pitches and others with half-size pitches, with these facilities supplemented by more than 20 full-sized outdoor artificial pitches and over 100 smaller artificial pitches throughout the country. All children's schools in the country now have at least a five-a-side football pitch on their premises. Additionally, all of the football houses are publicly owned, making access easier and much less expensive than comparable facilities in many other countries.

At the same time, KSí invested heavily in training of coaches, starting a regular program designed to equip coaches with UEFA "A" and "B" licenses. The association chose to conduct all courses at its headquarters in Reykjavík, and deliberately chose not to make a profit off the courses, reducing costs for participants. By January 2016, more than 180 Icelandic coaches held an A license and nearly 600 held a B license; an additional 13 held UEFA's highest Pro license. This translates to about one in every 500 Icelanders being a UEFA-qualified coach. By contrast, the corresponding ratio in England is about 1 in 10,000. Many top clubs in the country have B-licensed and even A-licensed coaches overseeing children as young as age 6. Every UEFA-licensed coach in the country has a paid coaching position, although only a small number receive a full-time salary.

== Men's national football team ==
The national team played its first match in 1930 against the Faroe Islands, and won by one goal to nil. Following the affiliation of the Federation to FIFA in 1947 and UEFA in 1954, the selection was committed for the first time in the qualifiers for the World Cup in 1957.

Iceland qualified for their first finals of an international competition on the occasion of Euro 2016, and reached the quarter-finals. The team plays its home games at Laugardalsvöllur stadium (15,000 seats), built in 1958 and located in the capital, Reykjavik. The current manager is Heimir Hallgrímsson, who served as co-manager alongside Swede Lars Lagerbäck before the latter departed following Euro 2016 and took the Norway position. Iceland ended 2015 at 36th in the FIFA World Rankings, and rose to their highest-ever position of 19th in July 2017.

Iceland became the smallest nation by population ever to clinch a FIFA World Cup spot when they secured qualification for the 2018 tournament on 9 October 2017 by defeating Kosovo 2–0.

== National football stadium ==
Arena	Capacity	City	Home team(s)	Opened
Laugardalsvöllur	9,500	Reykjavík	Iceland national football team	1959

== Attendances ==
The average attendance per top-flight football league season and the club with the highest average attendance:

Season	League average	Best club	Best club average
2025	851	KR	1,443
2024	843	Breiðablik	1,224
