= Selma Sól Magnúsdóttir =

Icelandic footballer

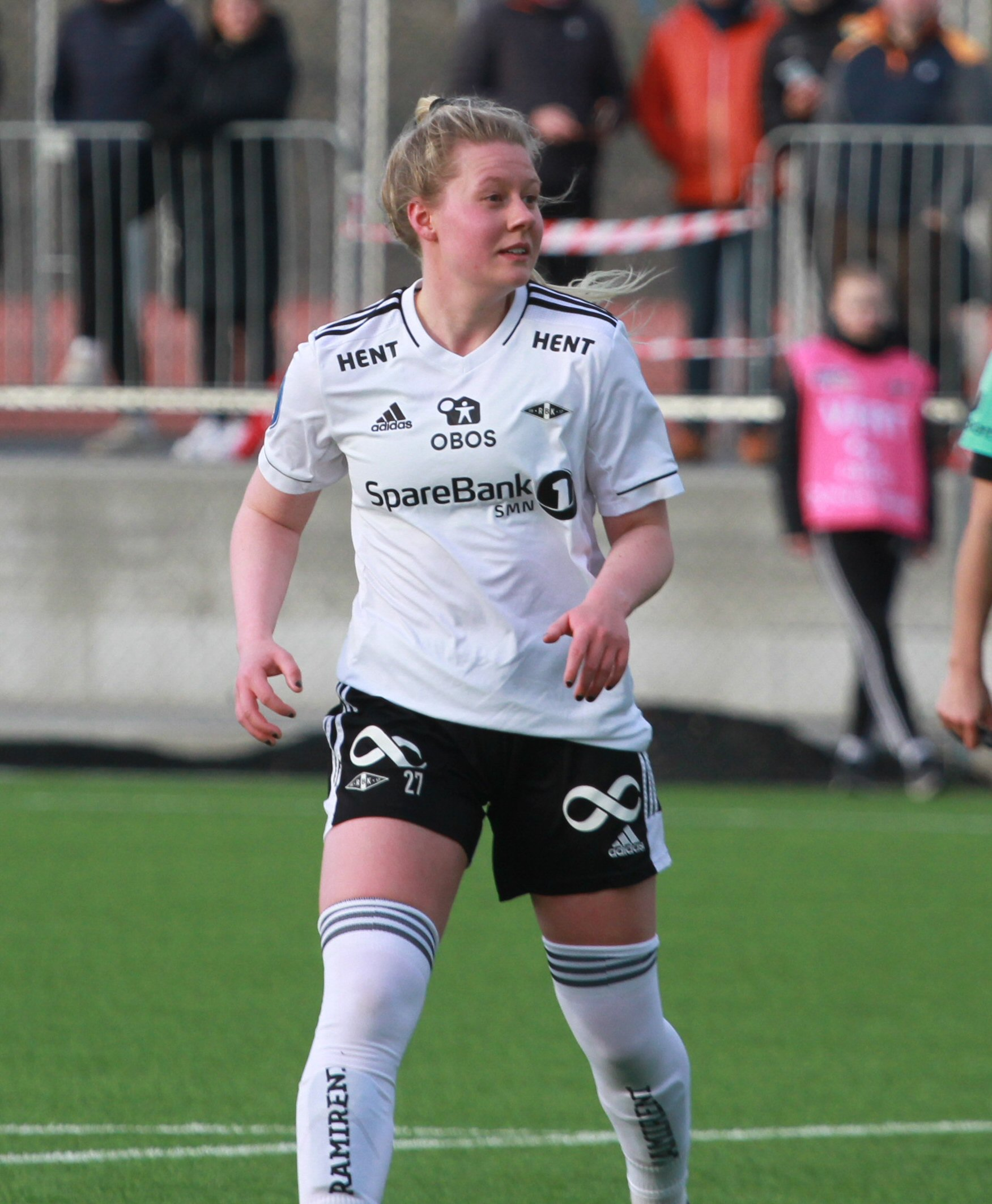
- Selma Sól in 2022

Personal information
- Date of birth: 23 April 1998 (age 28)
- Place of birth: Iceland
- Height: 1.73 m (5 ft 8 in)
- Position: Midfielder

Team information
- Current team: Rosenborg

Senior career*
Years	Team	Apps	(Gls)
2013–2021	Breiðablik	69	(8)
2015	→ Fylkir (loan)	14	(0)
2022–2023	Rosenborg	15	(3)
2024	1. FC Nürnberg	12	(4)
2024–	Rosenborg	0	(0)

International career^{‡}
2018–	Iceland	39	(4)
- * Club domestic league appearances and goals as of 4 June 2024 (UTC) ‡ National team caps and goals as of 09:59, 22 February 2023 (UTC)

Selma Sól Magnúsdóttir (born 23 April 1998) is an Icelandic footballer who last played as a midfielder for Norwegian side Rosenborg, and for the Iceland women's national team.

== Club career ==
Selma Sól began her senior career at Breiðablik, during which she was loaned to Fylkir in 2015. She remained with Breiðablik until 2021, then transferred to Norwegian side Rosenborg. In January 2024, she signed with Bundesliga club 1. FC Nürnberg, for the remainder of the 2023–24 season before the team's relegation.

== International career ==
Selma Sól has been capped for the Iceland national team, appearing for the team during the 2019 FIFA Women's World Cup qualifying cycle.

== Honours ==
Breiðablik

- Besta deild kvenna: 2018, 2020
- Icelandic Cup: 2013, 2016, 2018, 2021
- Icelandic Super Cup: 2014, 2016, 2017, 2019

Rosenborg

- Norwegian Cup: 2023

== International goals ==
No.	Date	Venue	Opponent	Score	Result	Competition
1.	6 March 2019	Bela Vista Municipal Stadium, Parchal, Portugal	Portugal	2–0	4–1	2019 Algarve Cup
2.	20 February 2022	Dignity Health Sports Park, Carson, United States	Czech Republic	2–0	2–1	2022 SheBelieves Cup
3.	2 September 2022	Laugardalsvöllur, Reykjavík, Iceland	Belarus	6–0	6–0	2023 FIFA Women's World Cup qualification
4.	21 February 2023	Pinatar Arena, San Pedro del Pinatar, Spain	Philippines	3–0	5–0	2023 Pinatar Cup
5.	24 October 2024	Q2 Stadium, Austin, United States	United States	1–1	1–3	Friendly
