= Women's football in Iceland =

Overview of Iceland in football

Women's Football in Iceland
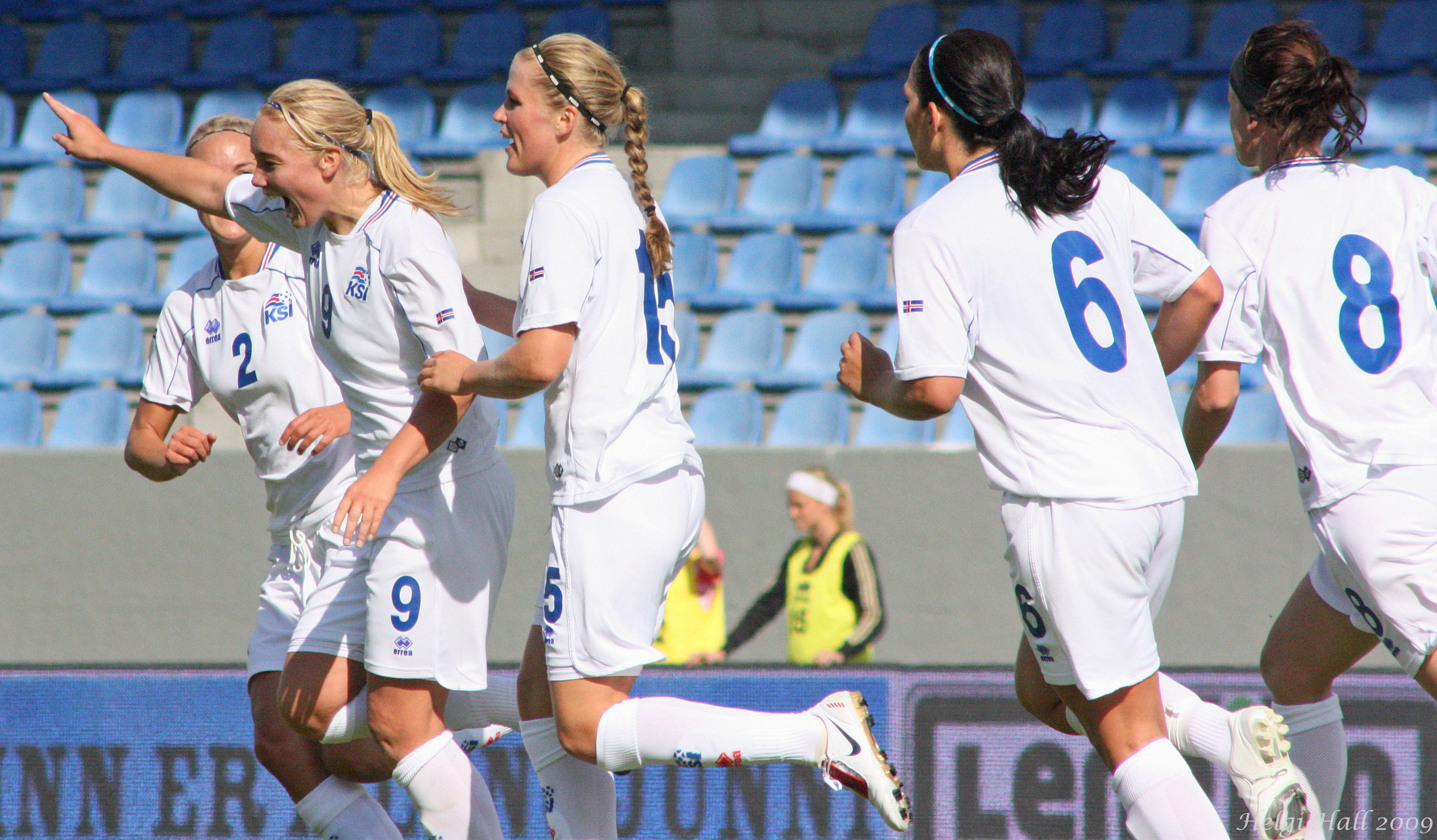
- Margrét Lára Viðarsdóttir scoring against Serbia in 2009.
- Country: Iceland
- Governing body: Iceland Football Association
- National team: Women's national team

National competitions
- FIFA Women's World Cup; UEFA Women's Championship

Club competitions
- League: 1. deild kvenna 2. deild kvenna Kvinde 2. division Cups: Icelandic Women's Football Cup

International competitions
- UEFA Women's Champions League

Women's football in Iceland is growing in popularity.

== History ==
The first women's football team in Iceland was Fótboltafélagið Hvöt that was founded in 1914 in Ísafjörður after the girls had been denied to practice with Fótboltafélag Ísafjarðar, an all-boys team. A year later, future actress Anna Borg founded a short lived football team in Reykjavík.

It took several decades for a women's national league to form, first with an indoors league in 1971. A year later the transition to the modern day outdoor league came with 8 teams participating in the inaugural season. Few of Iceland's traditional footballing heavyweights participated at first, but came in with the main expansion in 1982.

== Club Football ==
Besta deild kvenna is the highest tier of women's football in Iceland.

== International Team ==
Since the 21st Century Iceland has seen an upsurge of success with the national team qualifying for the UEFA Women's Championship four times and their greatest achievement was reaching the quarter finals of UEFA Women's Euro 2013. Most of the best players play overseas.

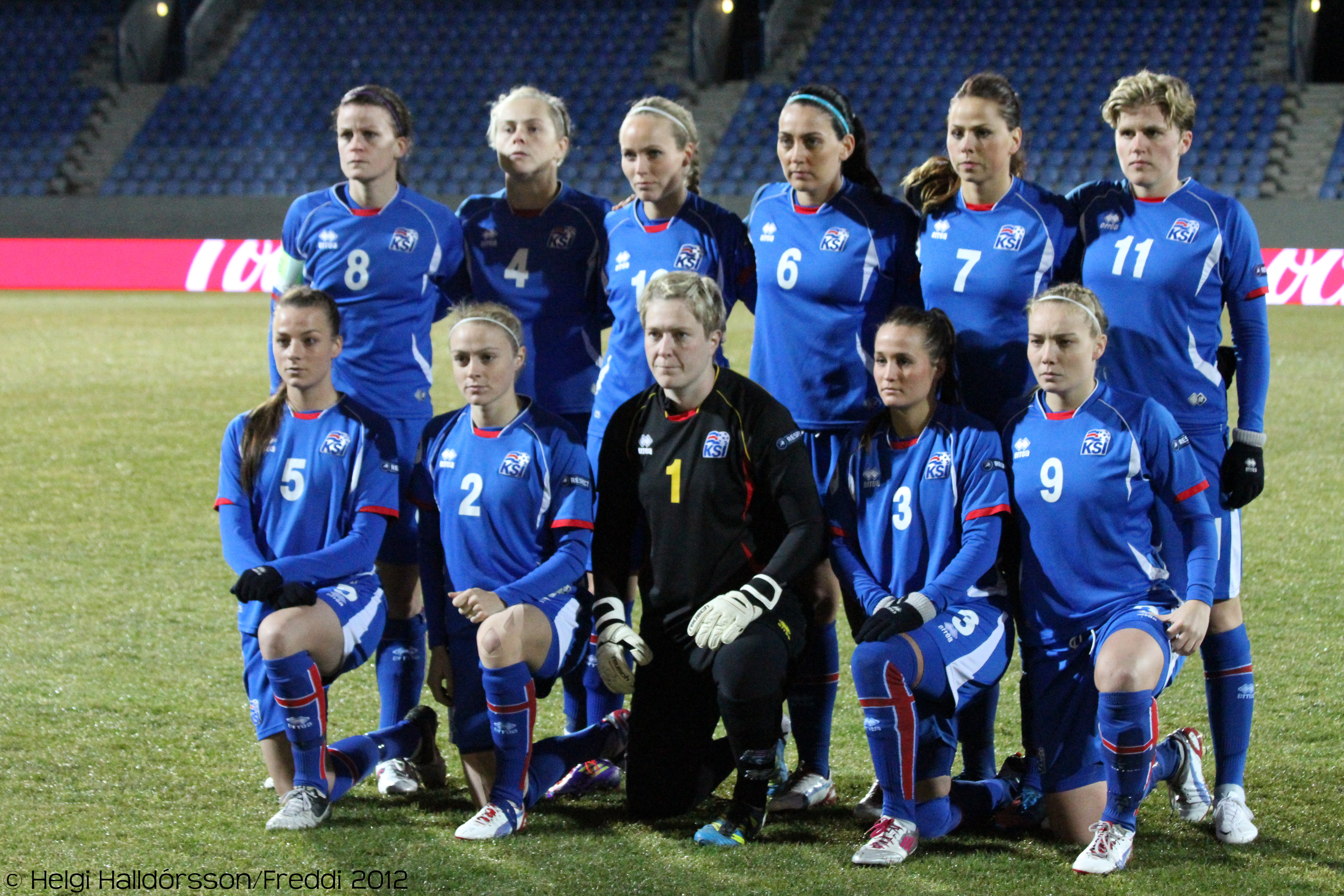
Iceland women's national football team line-up in 2012
