= Katie Cousins =

American soccer player (born 1996)

Personal information
- Full name: Katherine Amanda Cousins
- Date of birth: September 25, 1996 (age 30)
- Place of birth: Columbia, South Carolina, United States
- Height: 5 ft 0 in (1.52 m)
- Position: Midfielder

Team information
- Current team: Þróttur Reykjavík
- Number: 10

Youth career
- Richmond Kickers

College career
Years	Team	Apps	(Gls)
2015–2019	Tennessee Volunteers	74	(7)

Senior career*
Years	Team	Apps	(Gls)
2021	Þróttur Reykjavík	17	(7)
2022	Angel City	1	(0)
2023	Þróttur Reykjavík	20	(4)
2024	Valur	21	(2)
2025	Þróttur Reykjavík	23	(4)
2026	Damaiense	2	(0)
2026–	Þróttur Reykjavík	0	(0)

International career
2014	United States U-18		
2015–2016	United States U-20		
- * Club domestic league appearances and goals as of March 15, 2026

Katherine Amanda Cousins (born September 25, 1996) is an American professional soccer player who plays as a midfielder for Icelandic club Þróttur Reykjavík. She played college soccer for the Tennessee Volunteers, earning All-American honors twice. She was named the Gatorade National Player of the Year in high school in 2014.

Cousins began her professional career with Iceland's Þróttur Reykjavík in 2021, before joining National Women's Soccer League (NWSL) expansion team Angel City FC in 2022. She spent the next three seasons back in Iceland, winning the domestic cup double with Valur in 2024, before a brief stint with Damaiense in Portugal.

Cousins played for the United States up to the under-20 level, appearing at the 2016 FIFA U-20 Women's World Cup.

== Early life ==
Cousins was born in Columbia, South Carolina, the middle of three children born to Luther Cousins and Molly Cousins. She began playing soccer when she was four years old. After her family moved to Forest, Virginia, she joined the Richmond Kickers and earned NSCAA All-American recognition two times. She attended Jefferson Forest High School, where she played both soccer and basketball, played French horn in the band, and led the school's Fellowship of Christian Athletes chapter.

In her junior year in 2014, Cousins was named the Gatorade National Player of the Year, presented to the country's best high school soccer player, after recording 8 goals and 5 assists for Jefferson Forest and leading the team to a 14–1 record. She was ranked by TopDrawerSoccer as the top recruit of the 2015 class. She committed to Tennessee in 2012 over other offers including Virginia, Clemson, and Wake Forest.

== College career ==
Cousins graduated high school and enrolled at Tennessee one semester early. She played in all 18 games in her freshman season in 2015, making the Southeastern Conference (SEC) all-freshman team. She redshirted the entire 2016 season to focus on the 2016 FIFA U-20 Women's World Cup.

When she returned in 2017, Cousins started all 21 games for the Volunteers and scored 2 goals as she helped the team qualify for the NCAA tournament for the first time in five years. She was the only Volunteer to make her penalty in the shootout loss in the second round.

Cousins scored a career-high 3 goals in 21 games in 2018. In the NCAA tournament, she assisted Danielle Marcano's last-minute winner in the second round against Arizona as the Volunteers reached the quarterfinals for the first time in program history. She played in 14 games in 2019. During her final three seasons in Tennessee, Cousins was named All-SEC three times (twice first-team) and third-team All-American twice.

== Club career ==
Cousins began her professional career in Iceland's top-flight Úrvalsdeild kvenna, signing with Þróttur Reykjavík in January 2021. She scored 7 goals in 17 games in the 2021 season (second on the team), helping Þróttur finish third in the league. She also helped the team reach the final of the 2021 Icelandic Women's Football Cup, which they lost to Breiðablik. Cousins was named Þróttur's player of the season; Helena Ólafsdóttir later said that Cousins was one of the best foreigners ever to play in Iceland.

In December 2021, Cousins returned to the United States and joined National Women's Soccer League (NWSL) expansion team Angel City FC along with her Tennessee and Þróttur teammate M.A. Vignola. She signed for two years with an option to extend for an additional year. She made just one official appearance for Angel City, a stoppage-time substitution against the Portland Thorns on July 1, 2022. She also started and played 45 minutes in an exhibition game against the Mexico national team. Angel City released Cousins from her contract at the end of the 2022 season.

Cousins returned to Iceland and re-signed with Þróttur in December 2022. She scored 4 goals in 20 games in the 2023 season as the team placed fourth in the Besta deild kvenna.

Cousins joined city rivals and three-time defending champions Valur the following year. Playing a deeper role in the midfield, she scored 2 goals in 21 games in the 2024 season as the team finished runners-up to Breiðablik by one point. She collected two trophies with the team, winning the Icelandic Women's League Cup and the Icelandic Women's Cup. She also made her European debut with Valur, entering the UEFA Women's Champions League in the first qualifying round, where the team won against Ljuboten of North Macedonia, before losing to Twente of the Netherlands in the next game.

After failing to reach a contract extension with Valur, Cousins returned to Þróttur in February 2025, signing for two years. She played in 23 league games and scored 4 goals in her third stint with the club as they placed third in the league.

After spending four of her first five professional seasons in Iceland, Cousins joined Portuguese club Damaiense and made her debut in a 3–0 loss to Sporting CP on February 6, 2026.

In July 2026, Cousins returned to Þróttur in her fourth stint with the club.

== International career ==
Cousins was called into training camp with the United States under-15 team in 2011. During an under-18 camp in 2013, she was invited to scrimmage on the side of the under-20s and then called up to a friendly tournament at the older age level.

Cousins was named to the roster for the 2016 FIFA U-20 Women's World Cup in Papua New Guinea. She started four of the team's six games at the tournament. In the final group stage game, she assisted Mallory Pugh's equalizer and was named player of the match after a 1–1 draw against Ghana. She conceded a handball penalty in the semifinals, opening a 2–1 loss to North Korea. She started in the third place match, a 1–0 loss to Japan.

== Personal life ==
During her tenure at Angel City, Cousins received attention for sharing a social media post about baseball player Jason Adam's decision due to his Christian faith not to wear a rainbow-themed jersey for his team's Pride Night. Cousins later said in an interview: "Life just kind of blew up after that ... The fanbase was mad, my coach was mad. My teammates, I still haven't really talked to a couple of them".

== Honors and awards ==
Valur

- Icelandic Women's Football Cup: 2024
- Icelandic Women's Football League Cup: 2024

Individual

- Third-team All-American: 2017, 2018
- First-team All-SEC: 2017, 2018
- Second-team All-SEC: 2019
- SEC all-freshman team: 2015
- Gatorade National Player of the Year: 2014
