= Ásta Eir Árnadóttir =

Icelandic footballer (born 1993)

Personal information
- Date of birth: 23 August 1993 (age 33)
- Place of birth: Iceland
- Position: Defender

Senior career*
Years	Team	Apps	(Gls)
2009–2024	Breiðablik	176	(7)

International career^{‡}
2008–2009	Iceland U-17	12	(3)
2008–2009	Iceland U-17	6	(1)
2010–2012	Iceland U-19	10	(0)
2019–2023	Iceland	12	(0)
- * Club domestic league appearances and goals as of 6 October 2023 ‡ National team caps and goals as of 6 October 2023 (UTC)

Ásta Eir Árnadóttir (born 23 August 1993) is an Icelandic former footballer who played her entire career with Breiðablik. She was a member of the Icelandic national team from 2019 to 2023. She won three national championships and three national cups during her career.

== Club career ==
Ásta Eir started her senior team career with Breiðablik in 2009. In August 2018, she won the Icelandic Cup. She missed the 2020 season due to pregnancy.

Follwong Breiðablik's 2024 championship, she announced her retirement from football.

== International career ==
From 2008 to 2012, Ásta Eir played 25 games for Iceland's junior national teams. In February 2019, she was selected to the Icelandic senior national team ahead of its games in the Algarve Cup.

== Personal life ==
Ásta's mother, Kristín Anna Arnþórsdóttir, was a multi-sport athlete who played 12 games for the Icelandic national football team and 8 games for the Icelandic national handball team where she scored 18 goals.

== Honours ==
=== League ===
- Icelandic championship
  - 2015, 2018, 2024

=== Cups ===
- Icelandic Cup
  - 2016, 2018, 2021
- Icelandic Women's Football Super Cup
  - 2014, 2019
- Icelandic League Cup
  - 2012, 2019, 2022
