= Elín Metta Jensen =

Icelandic footballer (born 1995)

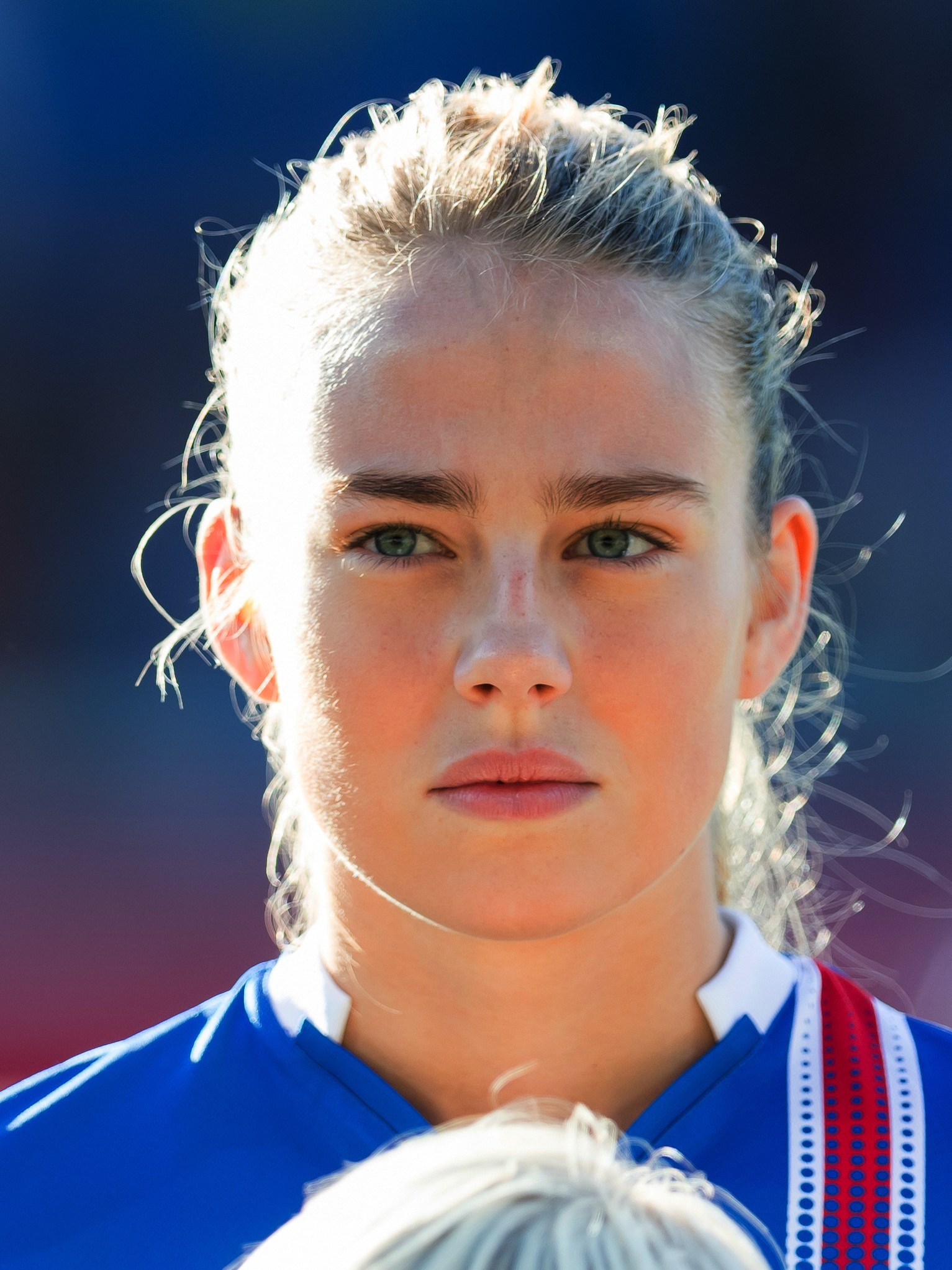
- Elín Metta Jensen in October 2017

Personal information
- Full name: Elín Metta Jensen
- Date of birth: 1 March 1995 (age 31)
- Place of birth: Reykjavík, Iceland
- Height: 1.72 m (5 ft 8 in)
- Position: Striker

Team information
- Current team: Þróttur Reykjavík

College career
Years	Team	Apps	(Gls)
2015–2017	Florida State	34	(8)

Senior career*
Years	Team	Apps	(Gls)
2010–2022	Valur	183	(132)
2023–	Þróttur Reykjavík	5	(2)

International career^{‡}
2010–2012	Iceland U17	14	(17)
2011–2014	Iceland U19	19	(9)
2012–2015	Iceland U23	2	(3)
2013–	Iceland	62	(16)
- * Club domestic league appearances and goals as of 3 October 2022 ‡ National team caps and goals as of 3 October 2022

Elín Metta Jensen (born 1 March 1995) is an Icelandic footballer who currently plays for Þróttur Reykjavík. Elín represented her country at the 2013, 2017 and 2022 editions of the UEFA Women's Championship.

== Club career ==
Elín has played for Valur since 2010. She made her Úrvalsdeild debut aged 15 in July 2010, scoring the fifth goal in Valur's 7–2 win over Haukar. In 2012, she scored 18 goals in 18 games to win the league's Golden Boot. Elín was voted Úrvalsdeild player of the year for the season of 2019, scoring 16 goals and providing 10 assists, a season that saw Valur win the title. Elín signed a new three-year contract with Valur in February 2020.

== International career ==
Elín made her senior international debut for Iceland on 16 June 2012, aged 17, replacing record goalscorer Margrét Lára Viðarsdóttir after 75 minutes of a 3–0 friendly win over Hungary. Her first two goals came in a 5–0 victory over Malta on 19 June 2014. Elín played in a historic 3–2 win over Germany in the 2019 World Cup qualifiers, scoring one goal and providing two assists to her teammate Dagný Brynjarsdóttir. Elín was also instrumental in securing a place for Iceland in the UEFA Women's Euro 2022, scoring the winning goal against Slovakia at home and the equalizer against Sweden, also at home. She finished as the top goalscorer in group F in the UEFA Women's Euro 2021 qualifiers. Elín was called up to be part of the national team for the UEFA Women's Euro 2013, 2017 and 2022.

== Honours ==
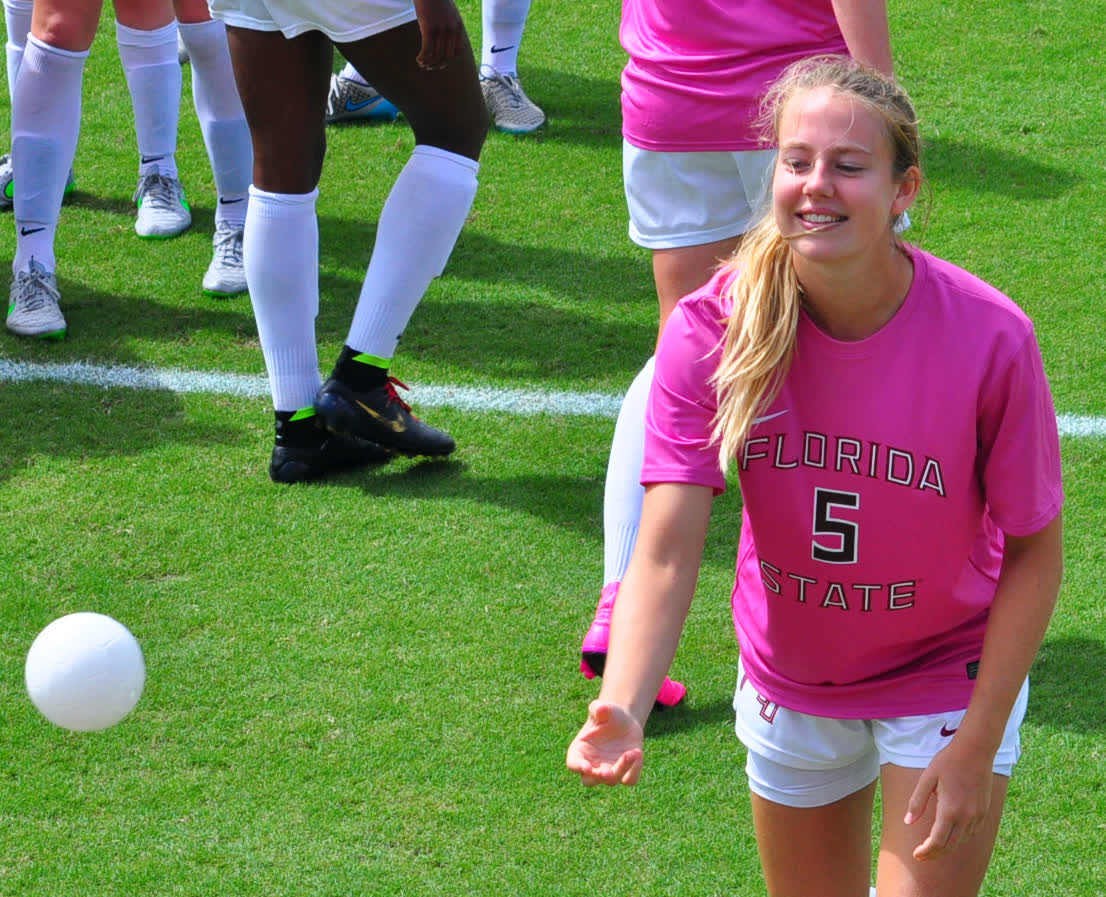
Jensen at Florida State

=== Club ===
Valur

Winner

- Icelandic Champion 2010, 2019, 2021, 2022
- Icelandic Women's Cup: 2010, 2011, 2022
- Icelandic Women's Football League Cup: 2017
- Icelandic Women's Super Cup: 2022

Runner-up

- Icelandic Women's Cup: 2012
- Icelandic Women's Football League Cup: 2013, 2019
- Icelandic Women's Super Cup: 2012, 2020

=== Individual ===
- Úrvalsdeild Player of the Year: 2019
- Úrvalsdeild Golden Boot: 2012

== Career statistics ==
=== Club ===
As of 20 August 2021

Appearances and goals by club, season and competition
Club	Season	League			Icelandic Cup		League Cup		Super Cup		Europe		Total	
Club	Season	Division	Apps	Goals	Apps	Goals	Apps	Goals	Apps	Goals	Apps	Goals	Apps	Goals
Valur	2010	Úrvalsd.	2	1	0	0	0	0	0	0	0	0	2	1
Valur	2011	Úrvalsd.	6	1	2	0	3	1	0	0	2	0	13	2
Valur	2012	Úrvalsd.	18	18	4	4	4	2	1	0	0	0	27	24
Valur	2013	Úrvalsd.	17	17	2	0	7	10	0	0	0	0	26	29
Valur	2014	Úrvalsd.	18	8	2	1	5	5	0	0	0	0	25	14
Valur	2015	Úrvalsd.	12	9	3	1	4	4	0	0	0	0	19	14
Valur	2016	Úrvalsd.	10	3	1	1	0	0	0	0	0	0	11	4
Valur	2017	Úrvalsd.	17	16	3	1	6	8	0	0	0	0	26	25
Valur	2018	Úrvalsd.	17	12	2	0	2	0	0	0	0	0	21	12
Valur	2019	Úrvalsd.	18	16	2	1	7	4	0	0	0	0	27	21
Valur	2020	Úrvalsd.	16	13	2	2	3	2	1	1	2	1	24	19
Valur	2021	Úrvalsd.	16	11	2	2	4	9	0	0	0	0	22	22
Valur	2022	Úrvalsd.	16	7	2	0	2	2	1	0	4	0	25	9
Þróttur	2023	Úrvalsd.	5	2	0	0	0	0	0	0	0	0	5	2
Career total			188	134	28	13	47	47	3	1	8	1	266	192

=== International goals ===
As of match played 22 September 2020. Iceland score listed first, score column indicates score after each Elín Jensen goal.

International goals by date, venue, cap, opponent, score, result and competition
No.	Date	Venue	Cap	Opponent	Score	Result	Competition
1	19 June 2014	Laugardalsvöllur, Reykjavík, Iceland	10	Malta	2–0	5–0	2015 FIFA Women's World Cup qualification
2	19 June 2014	Laugardalsvöllur, Reykjavík, Iceland	10	Malta	5–0	5–0	2015 FIFA Women's World Cup qualification
3	4 March 2016	Est. Bela Vista Parchal, Algarve, Portugal	15	Denmark	1–0	4–1	2016 Algarve Cup
4	7 June 2016	Laugardalsvöllur, Reykjavík, Iceland	20	North Macedonia	3–0	8–0	UEFA Women's Euro 2017 qualifying
5	6 April 2017	NTC Senec, Senec, Slovakia	26	Slovakia	1–0	2–0	Friendly
6	18 September 2017	Laugardalsvöllur, Reykjavík, Iceland	30	Faroe Islands	1–0	8–0	2019 FIFA Women's World Cup qualification
7	18 September 2017	Laugardalsvöllur, Reykjavík, Iceland	30	Faroe Islands	3–0	8–0	2019 FIFA Women's World Cup qualification
8	20 October 2017	BRITA-Arena, Wiesbaden, Germany	31	Germany	2–1	3–2	2019 FIFA Women's World Cup qualification
9	21 January 2019	La Manga, La Manga, Spain	37	Scotland	1–0	2–1	Friendly
10	21 January 2019	La Manga, La Manga, Spain	37	Scotland	2–0	2–1	Friendly
11	29 August 2019	Laugardalsvöllur, Reykjavík, Iceland	43	Hungary	1–0	4–1	UEFA Women's Euro 2021 qualifying
12	29 August 2019	Laugardalsvöllur, Reykjavík, Iceland	43	Hungary	4–1	4–1	UEFA Women's Euro 2021 qualifying
13	2 September 2019	Laugardalsvöllur, Reykjavík, Iceland	44	Slovakia	1–0	1–0	UEFA Women's Euro 2021 qualifying
14	8 October 2019	Daugava Stadium, Riga, Latvia	46	Latvia	4–0	6–0	UEFA Women's Euro 2021 qualifying
15	17 September 2020	Laugardalsvöllur, Reykjavík, Iceland	50	Latvia	1–0	9–0	UEFA Women's Euro 2021 qualifying
16	22 September 2020	Laugardalsvöllur, Reykjavík, Iceland	51	Sweden	1–1	1–1	UEFA Women's Euro 2021 qualifying

== Personal life ==
In June 2025, Elín graduated as a Doctor of Medicine.
