= Reynir Karlsson =

Icelandic footballer (1934–2014)

Personal information
- Full name: Reynir Gísli Karlsson
- Date of birth: 27 February 1934
- Place of birth: Reykjavík, Kingdom of Iceland
- Date of death: 12 November 2014 (aged 80)
- Place of death: Reykjavík, Iceland
- Position: Defender

Senior career*
Years	Team	Apps	(Gls)
1950–1958	Fram		

International career
1956–1957	Iceland	3	(0)

Managerial career
- 1959–1961: Fram
- 1962: ÍBA
- 1966: Keflavík
- 1966–1967: Iceland
- 1968: Keflavík
- 1970: Breiðablik
- 1974: Breiðablik
- * Club domestic league appearances and goals

Reynir Gísli Karlsson (27 February 1934 – 12 November 2014) was an Icelandic football manager and player. He managed the Icelandic national team in 1967.

== Playing career ==
A defender, Reynir played for Fram from 1950 to 1958. He played three matches for the Iceland national team from 1956 to 1957.

== Managerial career ==
Reynir was the manager of several clubs in Iceland, including Fram, ÍBA, Keflavík, and Breiðablik.

== Personal life ==
Reynir was married to Svanfríður Guðjónsdóttir, the first woman to be a member of the board of Football Association of Iceland. Their daughter, Ásta María Reynisdóttir, was a key player for the Breiðablik team that won 11 national championships and 4 Icelandic Cups from 1977 to 1995. Their son, Guðjón Karl Reynisson, played football for Breiðablik men's team and later managed the women's team.

== Honours ==
- 1. deild karla^{1}: 1970

^{1} The league was named 2. deild karla from 1955 to 1996
