= 2024 Besta deild kvenna =

Icelandic women's football league season

Besta deild kvenna
- Season: 2024
- Dates: 21 April 2024 – 5 October 2024
- Champions: Breiðablik (18th title)
- Relegated: Keflavík; Fylkir
- Champions League: Breiðablik; Valur
- Matches: 111
- Goals: 355 (3.2 per match)
- Top goalscorer: (Iceland) Sandra Jessen (22 goals)
- Biggest home win: Valur 7–2 Víkingur R. 2 May 2024; Þór/KA 5–0 Tindastóll; 24 May 2024; Breiðablik 6–1 Þór/KA; 22 September 2024
- Biggest away win: FH 0–4 Þór/KA; 27 April 2024; FH 0–4 Breiðablik; 7 July 2024
- Highest scoring: Valur 7–2 Víkingur R. 2 May 2024
- Longest winning run: 9 matches Valur
- Longest unbeaten run: 17 matches Valur
- Longest winless run: 9 matches Fylkir; Tindastóll
- Longest losing run: 7 matches Fylkir
- Highest attendance: 1,625; Valur 0–0 Breiðablik; 5 October 2024
- Lowest attendance: 60; Keflavík 1–2 Valur; 8 May 2024
- Attendance: 24,074 (217 per match)
- All statistics correct as of 5 October 2024.

The 2024 Besta deild kvenna was the 53rd edition of the Icelandic top-level women's football league.

The 2024 season has opened on 21 April 2024. The regular season concluded on 25 August 2024 with the championship round running until 5 October 2024.

Breiðablik won the 2024 season with a narrow 1 point lead over Valur.

== Tiebreakers for league ranking ==
The following criteria are applied to determine the order of the teams in all rounds of the leagues:

1. The total number of points;
2. Goal difference in all league matches;
3. Number of goals scored in all league matches;
4. Number of points in head-to-head matches;
5. Goal difference in head-to-head matches;
6. Number of goals scored in head-to-head matches;
7. Number of away goals scored in head-to-head matches;

If teams are still tied after all the above criteria are applied, a play-off match is held to determine the order.

== Teams ==
Locations of teams in the 2024 Besta deild.

Team	Home city	Home ground	Capacity	2023 finish
Breiðablik	Kópavogur	Kópavogsvöllur	3,009	2nd
FH	Hafnarfjörður	BIRTU völlurinn	2,120	6th
Fylkir	Reykjavík	Würth völlurinn	1,800	2nd (1. deild)
Keflavík	Reykjanesbær	Nettóhöllin	1,000	8th
Stjarnan	Garðabær	Samsungvöllurinn	1,400	4th
Tindastóll	Sauðárkrókur	Sauðárkróksvöllur	1,300	7th
Þór/KA	Akureyri	Boginn	400	5th
Þróttur R.	Reykjavík	AVIS völlurinn	3,000	3rd
Valur	Reykjavík	N1-völlurinn Hlíðarenda	1,524	1st
Víkingur R.	Reykjavík	Víkingsvöllur	1,449	1st (1. deild)

=== Team changes ===
Entering league	Exiting league
Promoted from 2023 1. deild	Relegated to 2024 1. deild
Fylkir; Víkingur R.	ÍBV; Selfoss

== Regular season ==
=== League table ===
Pos	Team	Pld	W	D	L	GF	GA	GD	Pts	Qualification
1	Valur	18	16	1	1	48	16	+32	49	Advances to championship round
2	Breiðablik	18	16	0	2	46	9	+37	48	Advances to championship round
3	Þór/KA	18	9	3	6	40	28	+12	30	Advances to championship round
4	Víkingur R.	18	8	5	5	28	29	−1	29	Advances to championship round
5	FH	18	8	1	9	30	36	−6	25	Advances to championship round
6	Þróttur R.	18	7	2	9	23	27	−4	23	Advances to championship round
7	Stjarnan	18	6	3	9	22	34	−12	21	Participates in the qualifying round
8	Tindastóll	18	3	4	11	20	41	−21	13	Participates in the qualifying round
9	Fylkir	18	2	4	12	17	34	−17	10	Participates in the qualifying round
10	Keflavík	18	3	1	14	16	36	−20	10	Participates in the qualifying round

Source: KSÍ.is
Rules for classification: Tiebreakers

=== Results ===
Home \ Away	BRE	FHA	FYL	KEF	STJ	TIN	THK	THR	VAL	VIK
Breiðablik		3–0	1–0	3–0	5–1	3–0	4–2	3–0	2–1	4–0
FH	0–4		3–1	1–0	1–2	4–1	0–4	1–0	2–4	2–2
Fylkir	0–2	0–3		4–2	0–1	4–1	2–2	1–1	1–4	0–0
Keflavík	0–2	3–4	1–0		2–3	0–2	0–1	1–0	1–2	1–2
Stjarnan	0–1	4–3	2–1	1–0		0–2	1–4	1–2	1–1	1–2
Tindastóll	0–1	0–1	3–0	1–1	0–0		3–3	1–2	1–4	1–1
Þór/KA	0–3	0–1	3–1	4–0	2–2	5–0		2–1	1–2	0–2
Þróttur R.	2–4	2–1	1–0	4–2	1–0	4–2	2–4		1–2	0–1
Valur	1–0	3–1	2–0	2–1	4–0	3–1	3–1	1–0		7–2
Víkingur R.	2–1	3–2	2–2	0–1	3–2	5–1	1–2	0–0	0–2	

Source: KSÍ.is
Legend: Blue = home team win; Yellow = draw; Red = away team win.

== Championship round ==
=== League table ===
Pos	Team	Pld	W	D	L	GF	GA	GD	Pts	Qualification
1	Breiðablik	23	20	1	2	64	13	+51	61	Secures a spot in the 2025–26 Champions League qualifying round 2, champions path
2	Valur	23	19	3	1	54	18	+36	60	Secures a spot in the 2025–26 Champions League qualifying round 2, league path
3	Víkingur R.	23	10	6	7	34	36	−2	36	
4	Þór/KA	23	10	4	9	42	36	+6	34	
5	Þróttur R.	23	8	5	10	29	33	−4	29	
6	FH	23	8	1	14	32	49	−17	25	

Source: KSÍ.is
Rules for classification: Tiebreakers

=== Results ===
Home \ Away	VAL	BRE	THK	VIK	FHA	THR
Valur		0–0			2–0	1–1
Breiðablik			6–1	4–0	4–2	
Þór/KA	0–1			0–1	1–0	
Víkingur R.	1–2					1–1
FH				0–3		0–3
Þróttur R.		1–4	0–0			

Updated to match(es) played on 5 October 2024. Source: KSÍ.is
Legend: Blue = home team win; Yellow = draw; Red = away team win.

== Qualifying round ==
=== League table ===
Pos	Team	Pld	W	D	L	GF	GA	GD	Pts	Relegation
1	Stjarnan	21	7	4	10	29	41	−12	25	
2	Tindastóll	21	5	4	12	26	44	−18	19	
3	Keflavík	21	4	2	15	25	43	−18	14	Relegation to 2025 1. deild
4	Fylkir	21	3	4	14	20	42	−22	13	Relegation to 2025 1. deild

Source: KSÍ.is
Rules for classification: Tiebreakers

=== Results ===
Home \ Away	STJ	TIN	FYL	KEF
Stjarnan		2–1	1–2	
Tindastóll			3–0	2–1
Fylkir				1–4
Keflavík	4–4			

Source: KSÍ.is
Legend: Blue = home team win; Yellow = draw; Red = away team win.

== Statistics ==
=== Top goalscorers ===
As of 5 October 2024

Rank	Player	Team	Goals
1	(Iceland) Sandra Jessen	Þór/KA	22
2	(United States) Jordyn Rhodes	Tindastóll	12
3	(Iceland) Andrea Rut Bjarnadóttir	Breiðablik	11
3	(Iceland) Vigdís Lilja Kristjánsdóttir	Breiðablik	11
5	(United States) Samantha Smith	Breiðablik	9
6	(Iceland) Agla María Albertsdóttir	Breiðablik	8
6	(Iceland) Katrín Ásbjörnsdóttir	Breiðablik	8
6	(United States) Shaina Ashouri	Víkingur R.	8
6	(Iceland) Jasmín Ingadóttir	Valur	8
10	(Iceland) Amanda Andradóttir	Valur	7
10	(Iceland) Hildigunnur Benediktsdóttir	FH	7
10	(Iceland) Úlfa Úlfarsdóttir	Stjarnan	7

=== Attendance ===
Pos	Team	Total	High	Low	Average	Change
1	Breiðablik	2,918	507	107	243	−21.4%
2	FH	1,937	344	101	176	−13.3%
3	Fylkir	3,196	749	167	320	n/a^{1}
4	Keflavík	822	110	60	82	−22.6%
5	Stjarnan	1,639	304	74	149	−18.6%
6	Tindastóll	1,850	347	89	168	+17.5%
7	Þór/KA	2,186	278	103	182	+1.7%
8	Þróttur R.	2,221	867	72	202	−12.6%
9	Valur	4,101	1,625	112	342	−11.6%
10	Víkingur R.	3,204	552	97	291	n/a^{1}
	League total	24,074	1,625	60	217	+1.9%

Updated to games played on 5 October 2024
Source: KSÍ.is
Notes:
1: Team played last season in 1. deild.
