= Icelandic League Cup =

Icelandic League Cup may refer to:

- Icelandic Men's Football League Cup
- Icelandic Women's Football League Cup
