= Svanfríður Guðjónsdóttir =

Icelandic footballer (1940–2024)

- Born: 30 December 1940; Ísafjörður, Kingdom of Iceland
- Died: 13 September 2024 (aged 83); Reykjavík, Iceland
- Known for: Women's football
- Spouse: Reynir Karlsson (m. 1960; died 2014)
- Children: 2
- Awards: ÍSÍ Cross of Honor; ÍSÍ Gold Badge; KSÍ Gold Badge

Svanfríður María Guðjónsdóttir (30 December 1940 – 13 September 2024) was an Icelandic women's football pioneer and the first female member of the board of the Football Association of Iceland (KSÍ).

Svanfríður started working for Breiðablik women's teams in the 1970s and soon started attending the KSÍ's annual meetings as a representative of Breiðablik. She became a member of the KSÍ women's committee, along with Gunnar Sigurðsson and Sigurður Hannesson, when it was established in 1980. In September 1981, she accompanied the Icelandic women's national team for its first ever game, when it faced Scotland on 20 September. In July 1984, she and Sigurður Hannesson, resigned from the women's committee after the board of KSÍ decided not to register the women's national team for the upcoming UEFA competition. They both withdrew their resignation after the chairman of the Association, Ellert Schram, promised that KSÍ would find replacement matches for the team.

In December 1984 she became the first woman to elected as a member of the board of the Football Association of Iceland.

In February 1986, she attended the inaugural meeting of the FÍKK or Félag Íslenskra knattspyrnukvenna (English: Association of Icelandic Women's Footballers). In September the same year, she was a guest of honor at the first annual Icelandic women's football awards ceremony.

In 1992, Svanfríður was awarded KSÍ's Gold Badge for her work towards women's football. In 1996, the National Olympic and Sports Association of Iceland (ÍSÍ) awarded her its Gold Badge for her work. In 2019, ÍSÍ awarded Svanfríður the Cross of Honor, its highest honorary award.

The Svanfríður Trophy, that the winners of the Icelandic women's football Super Cup receive, is named in her honour.

== Personal life ==
Svanfríður was married to Reynir Karlsson, the former manager of the Icelandic men's national football team. Their daughter, Ásta María Reynisdóttir, was a key player for the Breiðablik team that won 11 national championships and 4 Icelandic Cups from 1977 to 1995. Their son, Guðjón Karl Reynisson, played football for Breiðablik men's team and later managed the women's team.
