= Kristín Anna Arnþórsdóttir =

Icelandic multi-sport athlete (born 1965)

- Born: 5 October 1965 (age 61); Reykjavík, Iceland
Association football career
- Positions: Defender; forward
Senior career*
Years	Team	Apps	(Gls)
19??–1994	Valur	99	(63)
1998	Grótta	4	(2)
International career
1984–1994	Iceland	12	(2)
- * Club domestic league appearances and goals
- Handball career
- Sport: Handball

Senior clubs
- Years: Team
- 19??–1984: ÍR
- 1984–1993: Valur
National team
Years	Team	Apps	(Gls)
–	Iceland	8	(18)

Kristín Anna Arnþórsdóttir (born 5 October 1965) is an Icelandic former multi-sport athlete. She was a member of Iceland's national teams in both football and handball. She was named the Úrvalsdeild kvenna Football Player of the Year in 1986 when she also lead the league in goals scored.

== Football ==
Kristín played 99 league games for Valur, scoring 63 goals. She had a short comeback with Grótta in 1998, appearing in 4 games and scoring 2 goals. She played 12 games for the Iceland national football team from 1984 to 1994, although there was no active national team from 1988 to 1992. She started her career as a defender but later moved to the forward position.

=== Honours ===
==== Titles ====
- Icelandic championship
  - 1986, 1988, 1989
- Icelandic Cup
  - 1984, 1985, 1986, 1987, 1988, 1990, 1995

==== Awards ====
- Úrvalsdeild kvenna Player of the Year
  - 1986
- Úrvalsdeild kvenna Top Goal Scorer
  - 1986

== Handball ==
During the winters, Kristín played handball for several years, first for ÍR and later for Valur. She played 8 games for the Icelandic national handball team, scoring 18 goals. In 1993, she won the Icelandic Cup while pregnant of her second child.

=== Titles ===
- Icelandic Cup
  - Winner : 1988, 1993

== Personal life ==
Kristín's daughter, Ásta Eir Árnadóttir, debuted for the Icelandic national football team in 2019.
