= Ásta María Reynisdóttir =

Icelandic football player

Personal information
- Date of birth: 5 October 1962 (age 64)
- Place of birth: Reykjavík, Iceland
- Position: Midfielder

Senior career*
Years	Team	Apps	(Gls)
197?–1990	Breiðablik	134	(40)
1995	Breiðablik	3	(2)

International career
1981–1987	Iceland	12	(4)
- * Club domestic league appearances and goals

Ásta María Reynisdóttir (born 23 February 1962) is an Icelandic former footballer who was a member of Iceland's ignaural national team in 1981. She was a key player for Breiðablik for almost two decades, winning eight national championships and three Icelandic Cups from 1977 to 1995.

== Personal life ==
Ásta María was born to Reynir Karlsson, the former manager of the Icelandic men's national football team, and Svanfríður Guðjónsdóttir, the first woman to be a member of the board of Football Association of Iceland. Her brother, Guðjón Karl Reynisson, played football for Breiðablik men's team and later managed the women's team.

== Honours ==
- Icelandic championship: 1977, 1979, 1980, 1981, 1982, 1983, 1990, 1995
- Icelandic Cup: 1981, 1982, 1983
