= Dida (footballer, born 1991) =

Brazilian footballer (born 1991)

Personal information
- Full name: Ana Lúcia Nascimento dos Santos
- Date of birth: 22 July 1991 (age 35)
- Place of birth: Simões Filho, Bahia, Brazil
- Height: 1.76 m (5 ft 9 in)
- Position: Goalkeeper

Team information
- Current team: Real Brasília
- Number: 12

Youth career
- Bahia

Senior career*
Years	Team	Apps	(Gls)
2009–2011	Caucaia		
2011	São José-SP		
2012	Atlético Mineiro		
2013	Centro Olímpico		
2013	Vitória das Tabocas	1	(0)
2013–2014	BÍ/Bolungarvík	31	(0)
2014	Vasco	4	(0)
2015	Rio Preto		
2015	Tindastóll	6	(0)
2015	São José	0	(0)
2016–2017	Santos	1	(0)
2017	Tindastóll	15	(0)
2017–2018	São Gonçalo	12	(0)
2018	Afturelding/Fram	5	(0)
2018	Augnablik	5	(0)
2018	Tiradentes	2	(0)
2018–2019	Maccabi Holon	5	(0)
2019	Grótta	10	(0)
2019–2020	Benfica	7	(0)
2020	Napoli	12	(0)
2021	Santos	1	(0)
2022–2024	Real Brasília	11	(0)
2025	Bahia	0	(0)

International career
2009	Brazil U19		
2009	Brazil U20	2	(0)
2015–2016	Equatorial Guinea	3	(0)
- * Club domestic league appearances and goals as of 19 June 2022

Ana Lúcia Nascimento dos Santos (born 22 July 1991), commonly known as Dida, is a Brazilian professional footballer who plays as a goalkeeper for the Campeonato Brasileiro de Futebol Feminino Série A3 club Clube Atlético Piauiense. She was a member of the Equatorial Guinea women's national football team before being disqualified from playing for them in 2017 due to a lack of familial connection to the country.

== Career ==
After making her debut playing for a number of local Brazilian sides, in 2013 she moved to Iceland to play for BÍ/Bolungarvík. She remained playing for various Icelandic clubs before moving to the Portuguese side Benfica in 2019. In 2021, Dida returned to Brazil and rejoined Santos but left in her second season after not renewing her contract. After playing a season each at Real Brasília and EC Bahia, in 2026 she signed to play for Clube Atlético Piauiense.

=== International career ===
Dida represented Brazil on the under-19 and under-20 national teams and was also called up at senior level but did not play for the senior team.

=== Controversy ===
From 2015 to 2016, Dida made appearances for the Equatorial Guinea national team, despite having no connection with the African nation. She played the 2015 CAF Women's Olympic Qualifying Tournament and the 2016 Africa Women Cup of Nations Qualifying. On 5 October 2017, she and other nine Brazilian footballers were declared by FIFA as ineligible to play for Equatorial Guinea, with Equatorial Guinea being banned from qualifying for the 2019 FIFA Women's World Cup as a result.

== Career statistics ==
=== International ===
As of 19 April 2021

Equatorial Guinea
Year	Apps	Goals
2015	1	0
2016	2	0
Total	3	0

== Honours ==
Grótta

- 2. deild kvenna: 2018

Benfica

- Supertaça de Portugal: 2019
