= Icelandic Super Cup =

Icelandic Super Cup may refer to:

- Icelandic Men's Football Super Cup
- Icelandic Women's Football Super Cup
