= Hauksdóttir =

Hauksdóttir is an Icelandic patronymic meaning daughter of Haukur. In Icelandic names, this is not a family name. Notable people with the surname include:

- Gunnhildur Hauksdóttir (born 1972), Icelandic artist
- Hrafnhildur Hauksdóttir (born 1996), Icelandic footballer
- Vigdís Hauksdóttir (born 1965), Icelandic politician
