= 2017 Icelandic Women's Football Cup =

Borgunarbikar kvenna

Tournament details
- Country: Iceland
- Teams: 28

Final positions
- Champions: ÍBV
- Runners-up: Stjarnan

Tournament statistics
- Matches played: 27
- Goals scored: 97 (3.59 per match)
- Top goal scorer(s): Laufey Elísa Hlynsdóttir; Sandra Stephany Mayor; Elena Brynjarsdóttir (4 goals)
- All statistics correct as of 9 September 2017.

The 2017 Icelandic Women's Football Cup, also known as Borgunarbikar kvenna for sponsorship reasons, was the 37th edition of the Icelandic national football cup. ÍBV were winners after beating Stjarnan in the final.

== Calendar ==
Below are the dates for each round as given by the official schedule:

Round	Main date	Number of fixtures	Clubs
First Round	6–7 May 2017	6	12 → 6
Second Round	22–23 May 2017	6	12 → 6
Round of 16	2–3 June 2017	8	16 → 8
Quarter-Finals	23–24 June 2017	4	8 → 4
Semi-Finals	13 August 2017	2	4 → 2
Final	9 September 2017	1	2 → 1

== First round ==
12 teams began the cup in the first round, with 8 teams coming from 2. deild kvenna (second division) and 4 teams from 1. deild kvenna (first division).

Team 1	Score	Team 2
6 May 2017
Víkingur Ó.	0–1	Þróttur R.
Grótta	1–2	ÍR
HK/Víkingur	6–0	Álftanes
Fjölnir	6–0	Hvíti riddarinn
Augnablik	2 – 1 (a.e.t.)	Afturelding/Fram
7 May 2017
Fjarðabyggð/Höttur/Leiknir F.	1 – 1 (a.e.t.) (0–3 p)	Einherji

6 May 2017	Víkingur Ó.	0–1	Þróttur R.	Ólafsvíkurvöllur, Ólafsvík
14:00		ksi.is	Sóley María Steinarsdóttir 80'	Attendance: 60; Referee: Jóhannes Elíasson

6 May 2017	Grótta	1–2	ÍR	Vivaldivöllurinn, Seltjarnarnes
14:00	Tinna Jónsdóttir 17'	ksi.is	Ástrós Eiðsdóttir 16'; Dagmar Mýrdal Gunnarsdóttir 45'	Referee: Óli Njáll Ingólfsson

6 May 2017	HK/Víkingur	6–0	Álftanes	Kórinn, Kópavogur
14:00	Laufey Elísa Hlynsdóttir 27', 33', 63'; Karólína Jack 50'; Milena Pesic 72', 89' (pen.)	ksi.is		Attendance: 30; Referee: Gunnar Freyr Róbertsson

6 May 2017	Fjölnir	6–0	Hvíti riddarinn	Extra völlurinn, Reykjavík
14:00	Lára Marý Lárusdóttir 27'; Ásta Sigrún Friðriksdóttir 35'; Rósa Pálsdóttir 61', 84'; Lilja Nótt Lárusdóttir 86'; Vala Kristín Theódórsdóttir 88'	ksi.is		Referee: Arnar Ingi Ingvarsson

6 May 2017	Augnablik	2–1 (a.e.t.)	Afturelding/Fram	Fífan, Kópavogur
17:00	Fanney Einarsdóttir 60'; Bryndís Gréta Björgvinsdóttir 97'	ksi.is	Stefanía Valdimarsdóttir 90+4'	Referee: Gunnar Oddur Hafliðason

7 May 2017	Fjarðabyggð/Höttur/Leiknir F.	1–1 (a.e.t.) (0–3 p)	Einherji	Fellavöllur, Egilsstaðir
14:00	Elísabet Eir Hjálmarsdóttir 39'	ksi.is	Barbara Kopacsi 47'; Bernadett Viktoria Szeles (yellow card) 74' (red card)	Referee: Guðgeir Einarsson

== Second round ==
The second round will be played 22–23 May 2017. 12 teams will compete, 6 winners from the first round and 6 teams from 1. deild kvenna.

Team 1	Score	Team 2
22 May 2017
Tindastóll	3–1	Völsungur
23 May 2017
Sindri	4–0	Einherji
Fjölnir	0 – 0 (a.e.t.) (4–2 p)	Keflavík
ÍA	2–3	Þróttur R.
HK/Víkingur	2–1	ÍR
Selfoss	5–0	Augnablik

22 May 2017	Tindastóll	3–1	Völsungur	Sauðárkróksvöllur, Sauðárkrókur
19:15	Kolbrún Ósk Hjaltadóttir 22'; Bryndís Rún Baldursdóttir 45'; Madison Cannon 80'	ksi.is	Hulda Ösp Ágústsdóttir 21'	Referee: Sverrir Gunnar Pálmason

23 May 2017	Sindri	4–0	Einherji	Sindravellir, Höfn
18:00	Phoenetia Browne 5' (pen.), 24'; Chestley Strother 33'; Shameeka Fishley 57'	ksi.is		Referee: Antoníus Bjarki Halldórsson

23 May 2017	Fjölnir	0–0 (a.e.t.) (4–2 p)	Keflavík	Extra völlurinn, Reykjavík
19:15		ksi.is		Referee: Ásbjörn Sigþór Snorrason

23 May 2017	ÍA	2–3	Þróttur R.	Norðurálsvöllurinn, Akranes
19:15	Ruth Þórðar Þórðardóttir 7'; Unnur Elva Traustadóttir 69'	ksi.is	Michaela Mansfield 59'; Sierra Marie Lelii 89', 111'	Attendance: 50; Referee: Gunnar Freyr Róbertsson

23 May 2017	HK/Víkingur	2–1	ÍR	Kórinn, Reykjavík
19:15	Edda Mjöll Karlsdóttir 63'; Laufey Elisa Hlynsdóttir 77' (pen.)	ksi.is	Mónika Hlíf Sigurhjartardóttir 90'	Referee: Arnar Ingi Ingvarsson

23 May 2017	Selfoss	5–0	Augnablik	JÁVERK-völlurinn, Selfoss
19:15	Anna María Friðgeirsdóttir 29', 40'; Magdalena Anna Reimus 37'; Eva Lind Elíasdóttir 62'; Barbára Sól Gísladóttir 90+4'	ksi.is		Referee: Magnús Garðarsson

== Round of 16 ==
The Round of 16 will be played 2–3 June 2017.

2 June 2017	Þróttur R.	0–3	Haukar	Eimskipsvöllurinn, Reykjavík
16:30		ksi.is	Marjani Hing-Glover 43', 44'; Heiða Rakel Guðmundsdóttir 86'	Referee: Gunnar Oddur Hafliðason

2 June 2017	Selfoss	0–1	ÍBV	JÁVERK-völlurinn, Selfoss
18:00		ksi.is	Cloé Lacasse 72'	Referee: Kristinn Friðrik Hrafnsson

2 June 2017	Sindri	2–5	Grindavík	Sindravellir, Höfn
18:00	Logey Rós Waagfjörð 51'; Chestley Strother 88'	ksi.is	Elena Brynjarsdóttir 1'; Rilany Aguiar da Silva 16'; Anna Þórunn Guðmundsdóttir 17'; Sara Hrund Helgadóttir 45' (pen.); Berglind Ósk Kristjánsdóttir 90'	Attendance: 50; Referee: Viatcheslav Titov

2 June 2017	KR	1–5	Stjarnan	Alvogenvöllurinn, Reykjavík
19:15	Þórunn Helga Jónsdóttir 84'	ksi.is	Ana Victoria Cate 13'; Katrín Ásbjörnsdóttir 16', 57' (pen.); Agla María Albertsdóttir 22'; Sigrún Ella Einarsdóttir 86'	Referee: Andri Vigfússon

2 June 2017	HK/Víkingur	2–1	Fjölnir	Kórinn, Kópavogur
19:15	Gígja Valgerður Harðardóttir 81'; Margrét Eva Sigurðardóttir 90+3'	ksi.is	Lára Marý Lárusdóttir 12'	Referee: Bryngeir Valdimarsson

2 June 2017	FH	0–4	Valur	Kaplakrikavöllur, Hafnarfjörður
19:15		ksi.is	Anisa Guajardo 49', 86'; Vesna Smiljković 63'; Málfríður Erna Sigurðardóttir 75'	Referee: Bríet Bragadóttir

2 June 2017	Tindastóll	2–1	Fylkir	Sauðárkróksvöllur, Sauðárkrókur
19:15	Madison Cannon 28'; Evan Banton 57'	ksi.is	Jasmín Erla Ingadóttir 27' (pen.)	Attendance: 67; Referee: Helgi Ólafsson

3 June 2017	Breiðablik	1–3	Þór/KA	Kópavogsvöllur, Kópavogur
16:00	Svava Rós Guðmundsdóttir 52'	ksi.is	Sandra Stephany Mayor 24', 44' (pen.), 73'	Referee: Gunnar Jarl Jónsson

== Quarter-finals ==
The quarter-finals will be played 23–24 June 2017.

23 June 2017	ÍBV	1–0	Haukar	Hásteinsvöllur, Vestmannaeyjar
17:30	Sigríður Lára Garðarsdóttir 76'	ksi.is		Referee: Viatcheslav Titov

23 June 2017	Stjarnan	3–2	Þór/KA	Samsung völlurinn, Garðabær
18:00	Kristrún Kristjánsdóttir 3'; Agla María Albertsdóttir 50'; Harpa Þorsteinsdóttir 85'	ksi.is	Sandra Stephany Mayor 10'; Sandra María Jessen 29'	Attendance: 124; Referee: Bríet Bragadóttir

23 June 2017	Grindavík	3–2	Tindastóll	Grindavíkurvöllur, Grindavík
19:15	Elena Brynjarsdóttir 33', 41'; Ísabel Jasmín Almarsdóttir 43'	ksi.is	Emily Key 69', 87'	Referee: Frosti Viðar Gunnarsson

23 June 2017	Valur	5–0	HK/Víkingur	Valsvöllur
19:15	Elín Metta Jensen 29'; Anisa Guajardo 56'; Arna Sif Ásgrímsdóttir 66', 79'; Stefanía Ragnarsdóttir 84'	ksi.is		Attendance: 50; Referee: Gunnar Helgason

== Semi-finals ==
The semi-finals will be played 13 August 2017.

13 August 2017	ÍBV	1–1 (a.e.t.) (4–2 p)	Grindavík	Hásteinsvöllur, Vestmannaeyjar
14:00	Cloé Lacasse 41'	ksi.is	Elena Brynjarsdóttir 90+6'; Dröfn Einarsdóttir (yellow card) 106' (red card)	Referee: Helgi Mikael Jónasson

13 August 2017	Stjarnan	1–0 (a.e.t.)	Valur	Samsung völlurinn, Garðabær
16:00	Guðmunda Brynja Óladóttir 117'	ksi.is		Attendance: 243; Referee: Pétur Guðmundsson

== Final ==
The Final will be played 9 September 2017.

9 September 2017	Stjarnan	2–3 (a.e.t.)	ÍBV	Laugardalsvöllur, Reykjavík
17:00	Agla María Albertsdóttir 42'; Harpa Þorsteinsdóttir 43'	ksi.is	Cloé Lacasse 4'; Kristín Erna Sigurlásdóttir 89'; Sigríður Lára Garðarsdóttir 112' (pen.)	Attendance: 1015; Referee: Bríet Bragadóttir

== Top goalscorers ==
As of matches played on 9 September 2017.

Rank	Player	Club	Goals
1	(Iceland) Laufey Elísa Hlynsdóttir	HK/Víkingur	4
1	(Mexico) Sandra Stephany Mayor	Þór/KA	4
1	(Iceland) Elena Brynjarsdóttir	Grindavík	4
4	(Mexico) Anisa Guajardo	Valur	3
4	(Canada) Cloé Lacasse	ÍBV	3
4	(Iceland) Agla María Albertsdóttir	Stjarnan	3
