= Andrea Rán Snæfeld Hauksdóttir =

Icelandic footballer

Personal information
- Full name: Andrea Rán Snæfeld Hauksdóttir
- Date of birth: 28 January 1996 (age 30)
- Place of birth: Iceland
- Position: Attacking midfielder

Team information
- Current team: FH

Youth career
- Breiðablik

College career
Years	Team	Apps	(Gls)
2016–2019	South Florida Bulls	78	(18)

Senior career*
Years	Team	Apps	(Gls)
2011–2021	Breiðablik	122	(10)
2021	→ Le Havre	7	(0)
2021	Houston Dash	1	(0)
2022	América	6	(0)
2023	Mazatlán	15	(0)
2024	FH		
2024–2025	Tampa Bay Sun	15	(0)
2025–	FH	0	(0)

International career^{‡}
2012	Iceland U16	4	(0)
2012–2013	Iceland U17	9	(0)
2014	Iceland U18	2	(0)
2013–2015	Iceland U19	20	(2)
2016–	Iceland	12	(2)
- * Club domestic league appearances and goals as of 24 July 2025 ‡ National team caps and goals as of 24 April 2022

Andrea Rán Snæfeld Hauksdóttir (born 28 January 1996) is an Icelandic professional footballer who plays as a midfielder for Besta deild kvenna club FH and the Iceland national team. She has previously played for South Florida Bulls in the American NCAA Division I, Breiðablik and FH in the Icelandic Besta deild kvenna, Le Havre in the French Division 1 Féminine, Houston Dash in the American National Women's Soccer League, and América and Mazatlán in the Mexican Liga MX Femenil.

== College career ==
Andrea Rán played college soccer for the South Florida Bulls. She was named the American Athletic Conference (AAC) midfielder of the year in 2018 and 2019. During her time at South Florida, she scored 18 goals in 78 starting appearances and was selected three consecutive seasons for the AAC All-Conference First Team.

== Club career ==
Andrea Rán played for Breiðablik from 2011 to 2021, making over 100 appearances for the club and helped win the league title twice. Her debut for the club in the Pepsi League was at the age of 15. She was loaned to Le Havre for part of the 2020–21 Division 1 Féminine season, where she made seven appearances.

In June 2021, Andrea Rán signed for American club Houston Dash. In February 2022 she signed with Club América of the Liga MX Femenil. In August 2023, she joined fellow Liga MX Femenil side Mazatlán.

In March 2024, Andrea Rán returned to her homeland Iceland, signing a contract with FH until the end of the season. The club announced the signing in Spanish too, due to her popularity amongst the Mexican fans. Andrea Rán returned to play in the United States in July 2024, signing with Tampa Bay Sun in the USL Super League, coached by Denise Schilte-Brown, who coached Andrea Rán while she played for the South Florida Bulls.

On 24 July 2025, Andrea Rán returned to FH for the second half of the Besta deild kvenna.

== International career ==
Andrea Rán played at youth level for Iceland, from under-16 up to under-19. She was first called up for Iceland's senior national team in January 2016.

== Honors ==
Breiðablik

- Úrvalsdeild kvenna: 2015, 2018
- Icelandic Cup: 2016, 2018
- Icelandic Super Cup: 2014, 2016

Tampa Bay Sun

- USL Super League: 2024–25

Individual

- American Athletic Conference Midfielder of the Year: 2018, 2019
- American Athletic Conference All-Conference First Team: 2017, 2018, 2019

== Personal life ==
Andrea Rán is in a relationship with professional baseball pitcher Shane McClanahan, who plays for the Tampa Bay Rays. The couple met while they attended college at the University of South Florida.
