= 2017 Valur season =

Valur
- Full name: Knattspyrnufélagið Valur
- Nickname: Valsarar
- Founded: 11 May 1911
- Ground: Hlíðarendi; Reykjavík; Iceland
- Capacity: 1,524
- Club Chairman: Þorgrímur Þráinsson
- Manager: Ólafur Jóhannesson
- League: Úrvalsdeild
- 2017: TBA
Home colours	Away colours

Knattspyrnufélagið Valur is an Icelandic athletic club based in Reykjavík, Iceland. In 2017, they competed in the following competitions: League Cup, Cup, Úrvalsdeild, UEFA Europa League, Super Cup.

== Competitions ==
=== League Cup ===
==== Group 3 ====
Pos	Team	Pld	W	D	L	GF	GA	GD	Pts	Qualification	VAL	ÍA	ÞÓR	HK	VIÓ	ÍR
1	Valur	5	5	0	0	17	7	+10	15	Withdrew After The Group Stage	—	3–1	—	—	2–1	5–2
2	ÍA	5	4	0	1	12	8	+4	12	Qualification for the Quarter finals	—	—	—	—	3–2	2–1
3	Þór	5	2	1	2	9	9	0	7	Qualification for the Quarter finals	2–4	2–3	—	2–1	—	—
4	HK	5	2	0	3	6	10	−4	6		1–3	0–2	—	—	2–1	—
5	Víkingur Ólafsvík	5	1	0	4	8	10	−2	3		—	—	0–2	—	—	—
6	ÍR	5	0	1	4	6	14	−8	1		—	—	1–1	1–2	1–4	—

Updated to match(es) played on 3 April 2017. Source: ksí.is

=== Matches ===
17 February 2017 Group 3 Match 1	Valur	5 - 2	IR	Reykjavík
19:00	Lárusson 8' 71'; Lýðsson 74'; Kristinn Ingi Halldórsson 80'; Sigurðsson 83'	Report	Hilmar Þór Kárason 59'; Guðfinnur Þórir Ómarsson 65'	Stadium: Egilshöll; Referee: (Iceland) Gunnar Jarl Jónsson

9 March 2017 Group 3 Match 2	HK	1 - 3	Valur	Kópavogur
19:00	Ásgeir Marteinsson 25' (pen.); Ingimar Elí Hlynsson (yellow card) 80' (yellow-red card)	Report	Kristinn Ingi Halldórsson 57'; Orri Sigurður Ómarsson 60'; Einar Karl Ingvarsson 77'	Stadium: Kórinn; Referee: (Iceland) Egill Arnar Sigurþórsson

19 March 2017 Group 3 Match 3	Valur	2 - 1	Víkingur Ólafsvík	Reykjavík
19:15	Bøgild 24'; Hansen 84'	Report	Óttar Ásbjörnsson 90+1'	Stadium: Hlíðarendi; Referee: (Iceland) Þorvaldur Árnason

25 March 2017 Group 3 Match 4	Þór Akureyri	2 - 4	Valur	Akureyri
18:30	Gunnar Örvar Stefánsson 67'; Sigurðsson 69'; Gauti Gautason (red card) 82'; Jóhann Helgi Hannesson (red card) 88'	Report	Lárusson 39' 71'; Guðjohnsen 51'; Sindri Björnsson 74'	Stadium: Boginn; Referee: (Iceland) Sigurður Hjörtur Þrastarson

30 March 2017 Group 3 Match 5	Valur	3 - 1	IA	Reykjavík
18:00	Lárusson 31' 73' 90'	Report	Þórður Þorsteinn Þórðarson 83' (pen.)	Stadium: Hlíðarendi; Attendance: 120; Referee: (Iceland) Vilhjálmur Alvar Þórarinsson

=== Super Cup ===
24 April 2017 Final	Valur	1 - 0	FH	Reykjavík
20:15	Sigurðsson 42'	Report	Guðnason (yellow card) 27'; Crawford (yellow card) 86'	Stadium: Hlíðarendi; Attendance: 440; Referee: (Iceland) Ivar Orri Kristjánsson

=== Úrvalsdeild ===
==== Results summary ====
Overall								Home						Away					
Pld	W	D	L	GF	GA	GD	Pts	W	D	L	GF	GA	GD	W	D	L	GF	GA	GD
20	13	5	2	37	16	+21	44	8	2	0	22	5	+17	5	3	2	15	11	+4

Last updated: 19 September 2017.
Source: ksi.is

==== Results by matchday ====
Matchday	1	2	3	4	5	6	7	8	9	10	11	12	13	14	15	16	17	18	19	20	21	22
Ground	H	A	H	H	A	H	A	H	A	H	A	A	H	A	A	H	A					
Result	W	W	D	W	L	W	W	W	D	D	W	W	W	L	D	W						
Position	1	1	1	1	1	1	1	1	1	1	1	1	1	1	1	1						

Updated to match(es) played on 21 August 2017. Source:
A = Away; H = Home; W = Win; D = Draw; L = Loss

=== Matches ===
30 April 2017 Match 1	Valur	2 - 0	Víkingur Ólafsvík	Reykjavík
19:15	Dion Acoff 65'; Sigurðsson (yellow card) 70'; Hansen 80'	Report	Egill Jónsson (yellow card) 27'; Kenan Turudija (yellow card) 83'	Stadium: Hlíðarendi; Attendance: 1,079; Referee: (Iceland) Petur Gudmundsson

8 May 2017 Match 2	ÍA	2 - 4	Valur	Akranes
19:15	Ingvar Þór Kale (yellow card) 23'; Stefański (yellow card) 32'; Þórður Þorsteinn Þórðarson 39'; Tryggvi Haraldsson (yellow card) 66'; Menzel 76'; Hafþór Pétursson (yellow card) 90+3'	Report	Lárusson 21' (pen.); Lýðsson 34'; Sigurðsson 58'; Ómarsson (yellow card) 61'; Hansen (yellow card) 82' (goal) 90+3'	Stadium: Akranesvöllur; Attendance: 887; Referee: (Iceland) Thorvaldur Arnason

15 May 2017 Match 3	Valur	1 - 1	FH	Reykjavík
20:00	Lárusson 33' (pen.) (yellow card) 35'	Report	Pálsson (yellow card) 30'; Lennon 83'; Bergsveinn Ólafsson (yellow card) 86'	Stadium: Hlíðarendi; Attendance: 1,407; Referee: (Iceland) Vilhjálmur Alvar Thórarinsson

22 May 2017 Match 4	Valur	2 - 1	KR	Reykjavík
20:00	Lýðsson 14'; Ómarsson (yellow card) 36'; Lárusson 45' (yellow card) 90+4'; Einar Karl Ingvarsson (yellow card) 55'; Sigurðsson (yellow card) 75'; Anton Ari Einarsson (yellow card) 81'	Report	Aron Bjarki Jósepsson (yellow card) 41'; Aðalsteinsson (yellow card) 56'; Thomsen 82' (pen.)	Stadium: Hlíðarendi; Attendance: 1,443; Referee: (Iceland) Thoroddur Hjaltalin

28 May 2017 Match 5	Grindavík	1 - 0	Valur	Grindavík
19:15	Alexander Veigar Þórarinsson (yellow card) 19' (yellow-red card); Andri Rúnar Bjarnason 50'; Jon Ingason (yellow card) 66'	Report	Arnar Sveinn Geirsson (yellow card) 30'	Stadium: Grindavíkurvöllur; Attendance: 699; Referee: (Iceland) Thorvaldur Arnason
