= Hrafnhildur Hauksdóttir =

Icelandic footballer

Personal information
- Date of birth: 4 September 1996 (age 30)
- Place of birth: Iceland
- Position: Defender

Team information
- Current team: FH

Youth career
- –2011: KFR
- 2011–2012: ÍBV

Senior career*
Years	Team	Apps	(Gls)
2012	ÍBV	0	(0)
2013–2016	Selfoss	58	(1)
2017–2018	Valur	12	(0)
2018–2019	Selfoss	20	(2)
2020–	FH	12	(1)

International career^{‡}
2013	Iceland U17	5	(0)
2014–2015	Iceland U19	13	(0)
2016–2017	Iceland	4	(0)
- * Club domestic league appearances and goals as of 18:16, 14 April 2021 (UTC) ‡ National team caps and goals as of 19:05, 14 April 2021 (UTC)

Hrafnhildur Hauksdóttir (born 4 September 1996) is an Icelandic footballer who plays as a defender for FH and the Iceland national team.

== Club career ==
Hrafnhildur played youth football for KFR. She played her first senior team match with ÍBV in the Icelandic League Cup in 2012. She transferred to Selfoss in 2013. She was named the Athlete of the Year for Rangárþing eystra in 2014 and again in 2016. In December 2016, she transferred to Valur.

Hrafnhildur returned to Selfoss in May 2018.

In October 2019, Hrafnhildur signed with FH.

== International career ==
Hrafnhildur debuted with the Iceland national team in 2016.
