= 2016 Icelandic Women's Football Cup =

Borgunarbikar kvenna

Tournament details
- Country: Iceland
- Teams: 25

Final positions
- Champions: Breiðablik
- Runners-up: ÍBV

Tournament statistics
- Matches played: 30
- Goals scored: 120 (4 per match)
- Top goal scorer(s): Berglind Björg Þorvaldsdóttir (5 goals)

The 2016 Icelandic Women's Football Cup, also known as Borgunarbikar kvenna for sponsorship reasons, was the 36th edition of the Icelandic national football cup.

== Calendar ==
Below are the dates for each round as given by the official schedule:

Round	Main date	Number of fixtures	Clubs
First Round	8–9 May 2016	9	18 → 9
Second Round	22–23 May 2016	6	12 → 6
Round of 16	10–12 June 2016	8	16 → 8
Quarter-Finals	4–5 July 2016	4	8 → 4
Semi-Finals	22–23 July 2016	2	4 → 2
Final	12 August 2016	1	2 → 1

== First round ==
18 teams began the cup in the first round.

Team 1	Score	Team 2
8 May 2016
Grótta	2–3	Tindastóll
Völsungur	3–1	Einherji
Sindri	1–5	Haukar
Augnablik	2–1	KH
9 May 2016
Hvíti riddarinn	0–5	HK/Víkingur
Álftanes	7–1	Víkingur Ó.
Fjölnir	0–2	Grindavík
ÍR	2–1	Fram
Skínandi	0–2	Keflavík

8 May 2016	Grótta	2–3	Tindastóll	Vivaldivöllurinn, Seltjarnarnes
14:00	Karen Sturludóttir 6'; Diljá Mjöll Aronsdóttir 37'	ksi.is	Kolbrún Ósk Hjaltadóttir 46', 66'; Snæbjört Pálsdóttir 57'	Attendance: 60; Referee: Arnar Ingi Ingvarsson

8 May 2016	Völsungur	3–1	Einherji	Húsavíkurvöllur, Húsavík
14:00	Lovísa Björk Sigmarsdóttir 45+1'; Krista Eik Harðardóttir 54', 72'	ksi.is	Karen Ósk Svansdóttir 23'	Attendance: 81; Referee: Halldór Vilhelm Svavarsson

8 May 2016	Sindri	1–5	Haukar	Sindravellir, Höfn
14:00	Ólöf María Arnarsdóttir 59'	ksi.is	Konný Arna Hákonardóttir 9', 19'; Hildigunnur Ólafsdóttir 45+9', 57'; Sunna Líf Þorbjörnsdóttir 88'	Referee: Gunnar Gunnarsson

8 May 2016	Augnablik	2–1	KH	Fífan, Kópavogur
18:00	Guðrún Gyða Haralz 45', 86'	ksi.is	Rakel Leósdóttir 2'	Referee: Samir Mesetovic

9 May 2016	Hvíti riddarinn	0–5	HK/Víkingur	Tungubakkavöllur, Mosfellsbær
19:00		ksi.is	María Soffía Júlíusdóttir 17'; Rakel Lind Ragnarsdóttir 25'; Milena Pesic 67'; Þórhildur Stefánsdóttir 88'; Lára Hallgrímsdóttir 90+2'	Attendance: 44; Referee: Daníel Ingi Þórisson

9 May 2016	Álftanes	7–1	Víkingur Ó.	Bessastaðavöllur, Álftanes
19:00	Sunna Sigurveig Thorarensen 5'; Margrét Eva Einarsdóttir 19'; Júlíana M Sigurgeirsdóttir 28', 46', 87'; Oddný Sigurbergsdóttir 62'; Sigrún Auður Sigurðardóttir 79'	ksi.is	Regína Sigurjónsdóttir 34'	Referee: Jovana Vladovic

9 May 2016	Fjölnir	0–2	Grindavík	Extra völlurinn, Reykjavík
19:00		ksi.is	Anna Þórunn Guðmundsdóttir 77'; Marjani Hing-Glover 88'	Referee: Guðrún Fema Ólafsdóttir

9 May 2016	ÍR	2–1	Fram	Hertz-völlurinn, Reykjavík
19:00	Heba Björg Þórhallsdóttir 27'; Ásgerður Arna Pálsdóttir 62'; Andrea Kristín Pálsdóttir (red card) 90+2'	ksi.is	Berglind Arnardóttir 90+2' (pen.)	Referee: Bríet Bragadóttir

9 May 2016	Skínandi	0–2	Keflavík	Samsung völlurinn, Garðabær
19:00		ksi.is	Birgitta Hallgrímsdóttir 24' (pen.); Anita Lind Daníelsdóttir 50'	Referee: Jóhann Ingi Jónsson

== Second round ==
The second round was played on 22–23 May 2017.

Team 1	Score	Team 2
22 May 2016
Álftanes	1–6	Keflavík
Þróttur R.	2–0	Tindastóll
Haukar	2–0	Augnablik
Völsungur	0 – 0 (a.e.t.) (4–5 p)	Fjarðabyggð/Höttur/Leiknir F.
23 May 2016
Afturelding	0–4	Grindavík
ÍR	1–2	HK/Víkingur

22 May 2016	Álftanes	1–6	Keflavík	Bessastaðavöllur, Álftanes
14:00	Oddný Sigurbergsdóttir 49'	ksi.is	Anita Lind Daníelsdóttir 41'; Sveindís Jane Jónsdóttir 64', 68', 70', 80'; Katla María Þórðardóttir 90+2'	Referee: Gunnar Oddur Hafliðason

22 May 2016	Þróttur R.	2–0	Tindastóll	Þróttarvöllur, Reykjavík
14:00	Þórkatla María Halldórsdóttir 4'; Eva Þóra Hartmannsdóttir 42'	ksi.is		Referee: Atli Haukur Arnarsson

22 May 2016	Haukar	2–0	Augnablik	Ásvellir, Hafnarfjörður
14:00	Konný Arna Hákonardóttir 71'; Heiða Rakel Guðmundsdóttir 73'	ksi.is		Referee: Samir Mesetovic

22 May 2016	Völsungur	0–0 (a.e.t.) (4–5 p)	Fjarðabyggð/Höttur/Leiknir F.	Húsavíkurvöllur, Húsavík
14:30		ksi.is		Referee: Halldór Vilhelm Svavarsson

23 May 2016	Afturelding	0–4	Grindavík	N1-völlurinn Varmá, Mosfellsbær
19:00		ksi.is	Sashana Carolyn Campbell 15', 66'; Dröfn Einarsdóttir 62'; Sara Hrund Helgadóttir 86'	Attendance: 47; Referee: Kristján Már Ólafs

23 May 2016	ÍR	1–2	HK/Víkingur	Hertz völlurinn, Reykjavík
19:00	Andrea Magnúsdóttir 83'	ksi.is	Þórhildur Stefánsdóttir 35', 44'	Referee: Jovana Vladovic

== Round of 16 ==
The Round of 16 were played on 10–12 June 2016.

Team 1	Score	Team 2
10 June 2016
KR	1–3	ÍBV
11 June 2016
Haukar	1–0	ÍA
FH	1–3	Stjarnan
Keflavík	0–5	Breiðablik
Fylkir	11–0	Fjarðabyggð/Höttur/Leiknir F.
Þór/KA	6–0	Grindavík
Selfoss	3–2	Valur
12 June 2016
HK/Víkingur	5–0	Þróttur R.

10 June 2016	KR	1–3	ÍBV	Alvogenvöllurinn, Reykjavík
19:15	Sigríður María S Sigurðardóttir 13'	ksi.is	Sigríður Lára Garðarsdóttir 28', 88'; Díana Dögg Magnúsdóttir 48'	Referee: Einar Ingi Jóhannsson

11 June 2016	Haukar	1–0	ÍA	Ásvellir, Hafnarfjörður
14:00	Margrét Björg Ástvaldsdóttir 65'	ksi.is		Referee: Sigurður Hjörtur Þrastarson

11 June 2016	FH	1–3	Stjarnan	Kaplakrikavöllur, Hafnarfjörður
14:00	Karólína Lea Vilhjálmsdóttir 90'	ksi.is	Donna-Kay Henry 5', 35'; Harpa Þorsteinsdóttir 67'	Attendance: 175; Referee: Sigurður Ingi Magnússon

11 June 2016	Keflavík	0–5	Breiðablik	Nettóvöllurinn, Keflavík
14:00		ksi.is	Andrea Rán Snæfeld Hauksdóttir 18', 28', 90+3'; Guðrún Arnardóttir 33'; Ingibjörg Sigurðardóttir 60'; Fanndís Friðriksdóttir (red card) 70'	Referee: Daníel Ingi Þórisson

11 June 2016	Fylkir	11–0	Fjarðabyggð/Höttur/Leiknir F.	Floridana völlurinn, Reykjavík
14:00	Berglind Björg Þorvaldsdóttir 9', 41', 54', 90'; Kristín Erna Sigurlásdóttir 19', 22', 45+1', 56'; Selja Ósk Snorradóttir 39'; Hulda Hrund Arnarsdóttir 66'; Sandra Sif Magnúsdóttir 68'	ksi.is		Attendance: 242; Referee: Kristinn Friðrik Hrafnsson

11 June 2016	Þór/KA	6–0	Grindavík	Þórsvöllur, Akureyri
16:30	Hulda Ósk Jónsdóttir 4'; Sandra María Jessen 14' (pen.), 57'; Andrea Mist Pálsdóttir 24'; Stephany Mayor 37', 45'	ksi.is		Attendance: 170; Referee: Bríet Bragadóttir

11 June 2016	Selfoss	3–2	Valur	JÁVERK-völlurinn, Selfoss
17:30	Lauren Elizabeth Hughes 80', 90'; Heiðdís Sigurjónsdóttir 90+2'	ksi.is	Elín Metta Jensen 14'; Margrét Lára Viðarsdóttir 48'	Referee: Hjalti Þór Halldórsson

12 June 2016	HK/Víkingur	5–0	Þróttur R.	Víkingsvöllur, Reykjavík
17:00	Milena Pesic 3', 28', 35'; Hugrún María Friðriksdóttir 21', 59'	ksi.is		Attendance: 80; Referee: Viatcheslav Titov

== Quarter-finals ==
The quarter-finals were played on 4–5 July 2017.

4 July 2016	ÍBV	5–0	Selfoss	Hásteinsvöllur, Vestmannaeyjar
17:30	Rebekah Bass 24'; Cloé Lacasse 41', 45', 57'; Sigríður Lára Garðarsdóttir 80' (pen.)	ksi.is		Referee: Helgi Mikael Jónasson

4 July 2016	Þór/KA	1–0	Fylkir	Þórsvöllur, Akureyri
17:30	Stephany Mayor 13'	ksi.is		Attendance: 157; Referee: Gunnþór Steinar Jónsson

12 June 2016	Stjarnan	4–0	Haukar	Samsung völlurinn, Garðabær
17:00	Jenna McCormick 5'; Donna-Kay Henry 48'; Þórdís Hrönn Sigfúsdóttir 71'; Katrín Ásbjörnsdóttir 87'	ksi.is		Attendance: 126; Referee: Gunnar Helgason

12 June 2016	Breiðablik	1–0	HK/Víkingur	Kópavogsvöllur, Kópavogur
17:00	Arna Dís Arnþórsdóttir 37'	ksi.is		Referee: Sigurður Ingi Magnússon

== Semi-finals ==
The semi-finals was played on 22–23 July 2016.

22 July 2016	Stjarnan	2–3	Breiðablik	Samsung völlurinn, Garðabær
19:15	Anna Björk Kristjánsdóttir 74'; Ana Victoria Cate 86'	ksi.is	Andrea Rán Snæfeld Hauksdóttir 31'; Svava Rós Guðmundsdóttir 43'; Fanndís Friðriksdóttir 66'	Attendance: 437; Referee: Ívar Orri Kristjánsson

23 July 2016	Þór/KA	0–1 (a.e.t.)	ÍBV	Þórsvöllur, Akureyri
12:30		ksi.is	Rebekah Bass 112'	Attendance: 203; Referee: Bryngeir Valdimarsson

== Final ==
The Final was played on 12 August 2016.

12 August 2016	Breiðablik	3–1	ÍBV	Laugardalsvöllur, Reykjavík
19:15	Olivia Chance 2'; Berglind Björg Þorvaldsdóttir 24'; Fanndís Friðriksdóttir 60'	ksi.is	Natasha Moraa Anasi 49'	Attendance: 2042; Referee: Erlendur Eiríksson

== Top goalscorers ==
Rank	Player	Club	Goals
1	(Iceland) Berglind Björg Þorvaldsdóttir	Fylkir/Breiðablik	5
2	(Iceland) Kristín Erna Sigurlásdóttir	Fylkir	4
2	(Iceland) Andrea Rán Snæfeld Hauksdóttir	Breiðablik	4
2	(Iceland) Sveindís Jane Jónsdóttir	Keflavík	4
2	(Serbia) Milena Pesic	HK/Víkingur	4
