= Barbára Sól Gísladóttir =

Icelandic footballer

Personal information
- Full name: Barbára Sól Gísladóttir Hlíðdal
- Date of birth: 26 March 2001 (age 25)
- Place of birth: Iceland,
- Position: Midfielder

Team information
- Current team: Breiðablik
- Number: 10

Senior career*
| Years | Team | Apps | (Gls) |
| 2016– | Selfoss | 92 | (9) |
| 2021 | → Brøndby (loan) | 10 | (2) |
| 2022–2023 | Selfoss | 29 | (3) |
| 2024– | Breiðablik | 22 | (1) |

International career^{‡}
| 2018 | Iceland U-17 | 6 | (0) |
| 2019–2020 | Iceland U-19 | 8 | (0) |
| 2021– | Iceland | 3 | (0) |
- * Club domestic league appearances and goals as of 19 December 2024 (UTC) ‡ National team caps and goals as of 13:43, 19 January 2021 (UTC)

Barbára Sól Gísladóttir (born 26 March 2001) is an Icelandic footballer who plays as a midfielder for Breiðablik, and the Iceland women's national team.

== Career ==
Barbára Sól has been capped for the Iceland national team. She earned her first call up to the national team in September 2020 after being selected by then-manager Jón Þór Hauksson.
