= Íþróttabandalag Vestmannaeyja in European football =

Íþróttabandalag Vestmannaeyja is an Icelandic football club that was founded in 1903. Based in Vestmannaeyjar, the team first qualified for a European competition when they finished in fifth place in 1968 to enter the 1969–70 European Cup Winners' Cup first round, where they were eliminated by Bulgarian side Levski-Spartak by 0–8 on aggregate. After coming second in 1971, ÍBV secured a place in the 1972–73 UEFA Cup. Their first European Cup participation was confirmed in 1979, after being crowned as winners, thus being allowed into the 1980–81 season of that contest. The Icelandic outfit achieved their best performance in the 1978–79 UEFA Cup of the second tie, where they were defeated by Poland's Śląsk Wrocław with a cumulative score of 1–4.

ÍBV's highest victory was against Hibernians of Malta in the 1997–98 UEFA Cup Winners' Cup qualifying stage, a 3–0 win at their home turf, Hásteinsvöllur. The biggest loss came against Borussia Mönchengladbach, in the 1973–74 European Cup Winners' Cup beginning phase, which was a 1–9 deficit at Bökelbergstadion. The side's most recent meeting was against Serbians Red Star Belgrade in the 2013–14 UEFA Europa League, recording a 0–2 comprehensive rout, following a 0–0 home draw and 0–2 away blow.

== Matches ==
List of Íþróttabandalag Vestmannaeyja games
Season	Competition	Round	Opposition	Home	Away	Agg.	Refs
1969–70	European Cup Winners' Cup	1R	(Bulgaria) Levski-Spartak	0–4	0–4	0–8	
1972–73	UEFA Cup	1R	(Norway) Viking	0–0	0–1	0–1	
1973–74	European Cup Winners' Cup	1R	(West Germany) Borussia Mönchengladbach	0–7	1–9	1–16	
1978–79	UEFA Cup	1R	(Northern Ireland) Glentoran	0–0	1–1	1–1 (Note: Won on away goals)	
1978–79	UEFA Cup	2R	(Poland) Śląsk Wrocław	0–2	1–2	1–4	
1980–81	European Cup	1R	(Czechoslovakia) Baník Ostrava	1–1	0–1	1–2	
1982–83	European Cup Winners' Cup	1R	(Poland) Lech Poznań	0–1	0–3	0–4	
1983–84	UEFA Cup	1R	(East Germany) Carl Zeiss Jena	0–0	0–3	0–3	
1984–85	European Cup Winners' Cup	1R	(Poland) Wisła Kraków	1–3	2–4	3–7	
1996–97	UEFA Cup	PR	(Estonia) Lantana Tallinn	0–0	1–2	1–2	
1997–98	UEFA Cup Winners' Cup	QR	(Malta) Hibernians	3–0	1–0	4–0	
1997–98	UEFA Cup Winners' Cup	1R	(Germany) Stuttgart	1–3	1–2	2–5	
1998–99	UEFA Champions League	1QR	(Serbia and Montenegro) Obilić	1–2	0–2	1–4	
1999–2000	UEFA Champions League	1QR	(Albania) KF Tirana	1–0	2–1	3–1	
1999–2000	UEFA Champions League	2QR	(Hungary) MTK Hungária	0–2	1–3	1–5	
2000–01	UEFA Cup	QR	(Scotland) Heart of Midlothian	0–2	0–3	0–5	
2002–03	UEFA Cup	QR	(Sweden) AIK	1–3	0–2	1–5	
2005–06	UEFA Cup	1QR	(Faroe Islands) B36 Tórshavn	1–1	1–2	2–3	
2011–12	UEFA Europa League	1QR	(Republic of Ireland) St Patrick's Athletic	1–0	0–2	1–2	
2012–13	UEFA Europa League	1QR	(Republic of Ireland) St Patrick's Athletic	2–1 (Note: After extra time)	0–1	2–2 (Note: Lost on away goals)	
2013–14	UEFA Europa League	1QR	(Faroe Islands) HB Tórshavn	1–1	1–0	2–1	
2013–14	UEFA Europa League	2QR	(Serbia) Red Star Belgrade	0–0	0–2	0–2	
2018–19	UEFA Europa League	1QR	(Norway) Sarpsborg 08	0−4	0–2	0–6	

== Overall record ==
=== By competition ===
As of 25 July 2013.

Competition	Pld	W	D	L	GF	GA	GD	Win% (Note: Win% is rounded to two decimal places)
European Cup / UEFA Champions League	8	2	1	5	6	12	–6	25.00
European Cup Winners' Cup / UEFA Cup Winners' Cup	12	2	0	10	10	40	–30	16.67
UEFA Cup / UEFA Europa League	24	3	8	13	11	31	–20	12.50
Total	44	7	9	28	27	83	–56	15.91

=== By country ===
As of 25 July 2013.

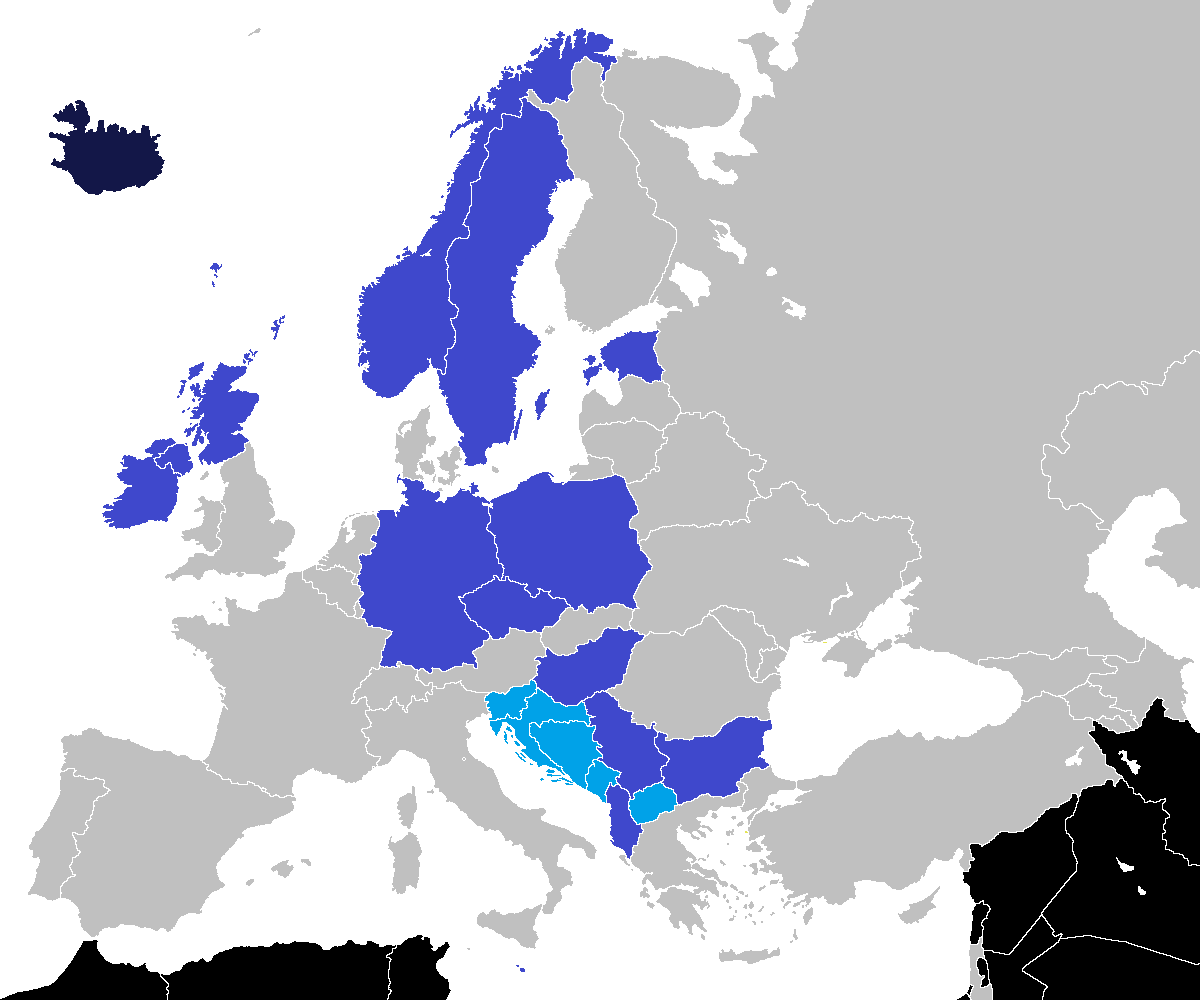
ÍBV's opponents highlighted in blue as shown on the map.

Country	Pld	W	D	L	GF	GA	GD	Win%
Albania	2	2	0	0	3	1	+2	100.00
Bulgaria	2	0	0	2	0	8	–8	0.00
Czechoslovakia	2	0	1	1	1	2	–1	0.00
East Germany	2	0	1	1	0	3	–3	0.00
Estonia	2	0	1	1	1	2	–1	0.00
Faroe Islands	4	1	2	1	4	4	0	25.00
Germany	2	0	0	2	2	5	–3	0.00
Hungary	2	0	0	2	1	5	–4	0.00
Malta	2	2	0	0	4	0	+4	100.00
Norway	2	0	1	1	0	1	–1	0.00
Northern Ireland	2	0	2	0	1	1	0	0.00
Poland	6	0	0	6	4	15	–11	0.00
Republic of Ireland	4	2	0	2	3	4	–1	50.00
Scotland	2	0	0	2	0	5	–5	0.00
Serbia	2	0	1	1	0	2	–2	0.00
Serbia and Montenegro	2	0	0	2	1	4	–3	0.00
Sweden	2	0	0	2	1	5	–4	0.00
West Germany	2	0	0	2	1	16	–15	0.00
Total	44	7	9	28	27	83	–56	15.91
