= Robert Menzel =

Polish footballer

Personal information
- Date of birth: 14 February 1991 (age 35)
- Place of birth: Wrocław, Poland
- Height: 1.92 m (6 ft 4 in)
- Position: Defender

Youth career
- 1998–2009: Wratislavia Wrocław
- 2009–2012: Śląsk Wrocław

Senior career*
Years	Team	Apps	(Gls)
2012–2015	Śląsk Wrocław	2	(0)
2013–2014	Śląsk Wrocław II	27	(2)
2014	→ Jarota Jarocin (loan)	14	(1)
2015	→ Legionovia Legionowo (loan)	14	(2)
2015–2016	Rozwój Katowice	28	(0)
2016–2017	Podbeskidzie	8	(0)
2017	ÍA	8	(1)
2018–2019	Kórdrengir		
- * Club domestic league appearances and goals

Robert Menzel (born 14 February 1991) is a Polish former professional footballer who played as a defender.

== Club career ==
He made his professional debut on 29 April 2012 against Zagłębie Lubin.

== Honours ==
Śląsk Wrocław

- Ekstraklasa: 2011–12
