= Kristrún Rut Antonsdóttir =

Icelandic multi-sport athlete

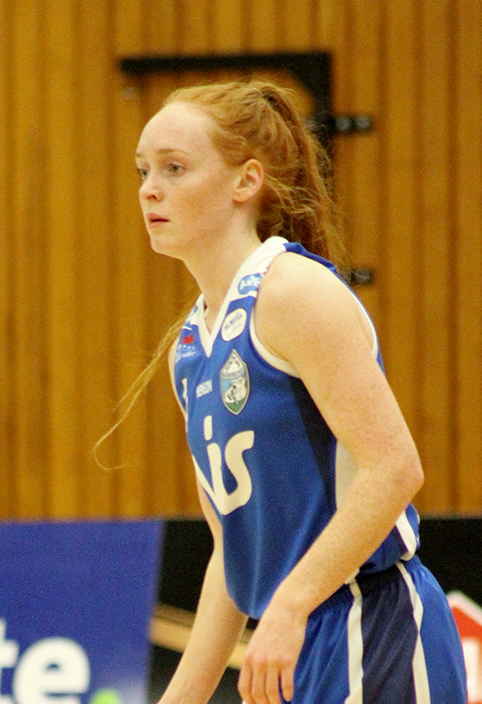
- Kristrún with Hamar in 2014.
- Born: 12 October 1994 (age 32); Odense, Denmark
- Height: 1.64 m (5 ft 5 in)
Association football career
- Position: Midfielder
Team information
- Current team: Selfoss
College career
Years	Team	Apps	(Gls)
2015–2016	Pepperdine University	3	(0)
Senior career*
Years	Team	Apps	(Gls)
2010–2014	Selfoss	43	(3)
2016–2017	Selfoss	31	(9)
2017–2018	A.S.D. Chieti	17	(5)
2018	Selfoss	8	(1)
2018–2019	A.S. Roma	5	(0)
2019	Avaldsnes IL	4	(0)
2019–2020	BSF	10	(0)
2020	Mallbackens IF	16	(0)
2021	St. Pölten	0	(0)
2021–	Selfoss	8	(1)
- * Club domestic league appearances and goals
- Basketball career

Career information
- High school: Potomac (Dumfries, Virginia)
- Playing career: 2009–2015
- Position: Guard
- Number: 5

Career history
- 2009–2012: Hamar
- 2013–2015: Hamar

Kristrún Rut Hassing Antonsdóttir (born 12 October 1994) is an Icelandic multi-sport athlete. She played in both the Icelandic top-tier basketball and football leagues and later professionally in football overseas.

== Early life ==
Kristrún was born in Odense, Denmark to Anton Tómasson and Helga Hassing.

== Football career ==
In October 2017, Kristrún signed with Serie B club A.S.D. Chieti. In her first game, she scored after 2 minutes in a 4–0 victory against Real Colombo. For the season, she appeared in 17 games for Chieti, scoring 5 goals.

She returned to Selfoss in May 2018 before signing with Serie A club A.S. Roma in July the same year. In April 2019, she left Roma and signed with Avaldsnes IL.

In June 2021, Kristrún signed back with Selfoss.

== Basketball career ==
Kristrún played five seasons with Hamar from 2009 to 2015 and helped the team to the 2010 Úrvalsdeild finals. She spent the 2012–2013 season playing for Potomac High School in Dumfries, Virginia.
