= Selfoss (women's football) =

Icelandic women's football team

- Full name: Ungmennafélag Selfoss
- Short name: Selfoss
- Ground: JÁVERK-völlur; Selfoss, Iceland
- Capacity: 750
- Manager: Alfreð Elías Jóhannsson
- League: 1. deild kvenna (football)
- 2026: 1. deild kvenna, 5th of 10
- Website: www.umfs.is/knattspyrna/
Home colours	Away colours

The Selfoss women's football club, commonly known as Selfoss, is a team in the women's football department of the Ungmennafélag Selfoss multi-sport club. It is based in Selfoss, Iceland, and currently plays in the 1. deild kvenna, the second tier women's football league in Iceland. The team plays its home matches at the JÁVERK-völlur.

== History ==
In August 2019, Selfoss won its first major trophy when it defeated KR in the Icelandic Cup final. On 6 June 2020, the team won the Icelandic Super Cup after defeating Valur 2 - 1.

== Players ==
=== First Team Squad ===
As of 13 June 2021.

Note: Flags indicate national team as defined under FIFA eligibility rules; some limited exceptions apply. Players may hold more than one non-FIFA nationality.

No.	Pos.	Nation	Player
1	GK	THA	Tiffany Sornpao
2	FW	ISL	Bryna Jónsdóttir
5	DF	USA	Susanna Friedrichs
6	DF	ISL	Bergrós Ásgeirsdóttir
7	DF	ISL	Anna Friðgeirsdóttir
8	MF	ISL	Katrín Ágústsdóttir
9	MF	ISL	Eva Abrahamdóttir
10	MF	ISL	Barbára Gísladóttir
11	DF	ISL	Anna Bergþórsdóttir
15	MF	ISL	Unnur Bergsdóttir
16	MF	ISL	Selma Fridriksdóttir
17	MF	ISL	Íris Gissurardóttir

No.	Pos.	Nation	Player
18	MF	ISL	Magdalena Reimus
19	FW	ISL	Eva Lind Eliasdóttir
20	MF	ISL	Helena Hekla Hlynsdóttir
21	MF	ISL	Thóra Jónsdóttir
22	FW	USA	Brenna Lovera
23	DF	AUS	Emma Checker
24	DF	ISL	Áslaug Sigurbjörnsdóttir
26	MF	ISL	Hólmfríður Magnúsdóttir
27	MF	USA	Caity Heap

== Trophies ==
- Icelandic cup
  - Winner: 2019
  - Runner-up: 2014, 2015
- Icelandic Super Cup
  - Winner: 2020

== Managers ==
- (United States) Valorie O'Brien (2015–2016)
- (Iceland) Guðjón Bjarni Hálfdánarson (2016)
- (Iceland) Alfreð Elías Jóhannsson (2016–present)

== Notable players ==
- (United States) Brenna Lovera
- (United States) Ally Haran
- (Guyana) Chanté Sandiford
- (Iceland) Dagný Brynjarsdóttir
- (Jamaica) Donna-Kay Henry
- (Iceland) Hólmfríður Magnúsdóttir
- (Iceland) Hrafnhildur Hauksdóttir
- (United States) Kelsey Wys
- (Iceland) Kristrún Rut Antonsdóttir
- (Iceland) Olga Færseth
