= Fótboltafélagið Hvöt =

First women's football team in Iceland

- Full name: Fótboltafélagið Hvöt
- Short name: Hvöt
- Founded: 14 July 1914
- Dissolved: 1916
- Ground: Hrossataðsvellir, Tangstún and Riistún

Fótboltafélagið Hvöt (English: Hvöt Football Club) was the first women's football club in Iceland. It was founded on 14 July 1914 in Ísafjörður and its first board was appointed by Guðrún Skúladóttir, the chairman, Bergþóra Árnadóttir and Ingibjörg Helgadóttir, and the team's first coach was Einar Oddur Kristjánsson. The club operated from 1914 to 1916 and the girls competed with each other as well as competing with boys' clubs in the town, so-called "Púka clubs". The clubs training grounds were at Hrossataðsvellir and they played their games there and at Tangstún and Riistún.
