= 2. deild kvenna (football) =

- Founded: 2017
- Country: Iceland
- Number of clubs: 10 (2023)
- Level on pyramid: 3
- Promotion to: 1. deild kvenna
- Relegation to: 3. deild kvenna
- Domestic cups: Bikarkeppni kvenna; Deildabikar Women
- Current champions: Fram (2nd title) (2022)
- Most championships: Fram (2 titles)
- Website: KSÍ.is
- Current: 2025 2. deild kvenna

The 2. deild kvenna is the third tier women's football league in Iceland. The league was founded in 2017. As of 2023 it features 10 teams and the top two qualify for a spot in the 1. deild kvenna.

== Past winners ==
Promoted teams shown in green

Year	Winners	Runners-up	3rd Place	4th Place
2017	Afturelding/Fram (Note: A joint team of Ungmennafélagið Afturelding and Knattspyrnufélagið Fram.)	Fjölnir	Álftanes	Augnablik
2018	Augnablik	Tindastóll	Álftanes	Grótta
2019	Völsungur	Grótta	Sindri Höfn	Fjarðabyggð/Höttur/Leiknir (Note: A joint team of Knattspyrnufélag Fjarðabyggðar, Íþróttafélagið Höttur and Ungmennafélagið Leiknir.)
2020	Grindavík	HK	Fjarðabyggð/Höttur/Leiknir	Álftanes
2021	Fjarðabyggð/Höttur/Leiknir	Fjölnir	Völsungur	Fram
2022	Fram	Grótta	Völsungur	ÍR

== By club ==
As of 2022

Club	Titles	Runners-up	Title year(s)	Runner-up year(s)
Fram	1	0	2022	—
Afturelding/Fram	1	0	2017	—
Augnablik	1	0	2018	—
Völsungur	1	0	2019	—
Grindavík	1	0	2020	—
Fjarðabyggð/Höttur/Leiknir	1	0	2021	—
Fjölnir	0	2	—	2017, 2021
Grótta	0	2	—	2019, 2022
Tindastóll	0	1	—	2018
HK	0	1	—	2020

== See also ==
- 2. deild karla (men's football league)
