= Tindastóll (women's football) =

UMF Tindastóll
- Full name: Ungmennafélag Tindastóll
- Founded: 1907
- Ground: Sauðárkróksvöllur, Sauðárkrókur
- Capacity: 1,300
- Chairman: Ómar Bragi Stefánsson
- League: 1. deild kvenna
- 2025: Besta deild kvenna, 9th of 10 (relegated)
- Website: http://www.tindastoll.is
Home colours	Away colours

The Tindastól women's football team, commonly known as Tindastóll, is an Icelandic football team based in Sauðárkrókur. It is part of the Tindastóll multi-sport club.

== History ==
On 18 August 2018, Tindastóll women's team achieved promotion from 2. deild kvenna to 1. deild kvenna. On 23 September 2020, Tindastóll achieved promotion to the top-tier Úrvalsdeild kvenna for the first time in its history. They made their Úrvalsdeild debut on 5 May 2021 with a 1–1 tie against Þróttur Reykjavík.

=== Titles ===
- 1. deild kvenna
  - Winners: 2020
- 2. deild kvenna
  - Runner-ups: 2018

== Current squad ==
As of 13 April 2026

Note: Flags indicate national team as defined under FIFA eligibility rules; some limited exceptions apply. Players may hold more than one non-FIFA nationality.

No.	Pos.	Nation	Player
1	GK	USA	Genevieve Crenshaw
2	MF	ISL	Saga Ísey Þorsteinsdóttir
3	DF	ISL	Bryndís Rut Haraldsdóttir (captain)
4	MF	ISL	Birna María Sigurðardóttir
5	MF	ISL	Bergljót Ásta Pétursdóttir
6	DF	ISL	Laufey Harpa Halldórsdóttir
8	DF	USA	Elise Morris
11	MF	ISL	Aldís María Jóhannsdóttir
12	GK	ISL	Sigríður Hrafnhildur Stefánsdóttir

No.	Pos.	Nation	Player
16	MF	ISL	Emelía Björk Elefsen
17	MF	ISL	Hugrún Pálsdóttir
18	MF	ISL	Sunneva Dís Halldórsdóttir
20	MF	ISL	Kristrún María Magnúsdóttir
23	MF	ISL	Magnea Petra Rúnarsdóttir
—	GK	SWE	Tea Lundmark
—	DF	ISL	Eydís Arna Hallgrímsdóttir
—	MF	ISL	Eyvör Pálsdóttir
—	MF	USA	Rita Feist Lang
—	MF	ISL	Sara Líf Elvarsdóttir
—	MF	ISL	Agnes Nótt Þórðardóttir
—	FW	GRE	Aimilia Daskalou

== Awards ==
- 2. deild kvenna Player of the Year:
  - Murielle Tiernan - 2018

== Notable players ==
- (Brazil) Dida
- (Iceland) Vanda Sigurgeirsdóttir
- (Romania) Laura Rus
- (United States) Makala Woods
