= Icelandic Women's Football Super Cup =

Icelandic Super Cup
- Organiser(s): KSÍ
- Founded: 1992; 34 years ago
- Region: Iceland
- Teams: 2
- Related competitions: Besta deild kvenna Icelandic Women's Football Cup
- Current champions: Víkingur (1st title)
- Most championships: Breiðablik (10 titles)
- Website: KSÍ

The Icelandic Women's Super Cup (Icelandic: Meistarakeppni kvenna), also known as the Meistarakeppni KSÍ kvenna, is an annual women's football match between the reigning champions of the Besta deild kvenna league and the Icelandic Cup holders, or if the same team holds both titles between the title-holder and the team placed second in the league, or occasionally the second-placed team in the Icelandic Cup. The match generally takes place at the start of the Iceland domestic season in May. The competition was uninterrupted from its founding in 1992 to 1998, and from 2003 (when the holders of the 2002 titles competed) until 2020. Title-holders from 1999, 2000, 2001, and 2021 did not play for this cup.

The most successful team is Breiðablik with a total of ten wins.

Since 2023, the winners receive the Svanfríður Trophy, named in honour of women's football pioneer Svanfríður Guðjónsdóttir.

== Past finals ==
List of Super Cup results
Year	League champions	Score	Cup champions
1992	Breiðablik	0–3	ÍA
1993	Breiðablik	4–2	ÍA
1994	KR	3–1	ÍA
1995	Breiðablik	0–1 (Note: The league champions had also won the women's cup.)	KR
1996 (Spring) (Note: There were two Super Cup matches played in 1996, one in the spring and one in the autumn, with the spring-game covering the year before and the autumn-game covering the just-finished season. For easier understanding, the years listed are always the year after a team won the Úrvalsdeild/Besta deild or Cup, so the autumn games are listed as having been played the year after they were played.)	Breiðablik	3–0	Valur
1996 (Autumn)	Breiðablik	1–0	Valur
1997	KR	3–1	Breiðablik
1998	KR	1–4	Breiðablik
1999	Not played		
2000	Not played		
2001	Not played		
2002	Not played		
2003	KR	1–2	Breiðablik
2004	KR	1–2	Valur
2005	Valur	10–0	ÍBV
2006	Breiðablik	5–1	Valur
2007	Valur	8–1	Breiðablik
2008	Valur	2–1	KR
2009	Valur	2–1	KR
2010	Valur	4–0	Breiðablik
2011	Valur	3–1	Þór/KA
2012	Stjarnan	3–1	Valur
2013	Þór/KA	0–0 (4–1 p)	Stjarnan
2014	Stjarnan	0–0	Breiðablik
2015	Stjarnan	4–1	Breiðablik
2016	Breiðablik	0–0 (4–3 p)	Stjarnan
2017	Stjarnan	0–3	Breiðablik
2018	Þór/KA	3–0	ÍBV
2019	Breiðablik	5–0	Þór/KA
2020	Valur	1–2	Selfoss
2021	Not played		
2022	Valur	0–0 (4–2 p)	Breiðablik
2023	Valur	0–0 (3–4 p)	Stjarnan
2024	Valur	1–1 (4–5 p)	Víkingur

== Results by teams ==
Super Cup champions and runners-up
Team	Winners	Runners-up	Years won	Years runner-up
Breiðablik	10	7	1993, 1996 (2), 1998, 2003, 2006, 2014, 2016, 2017, 2019	1992, 1995, 1997, 2007, 2010, 2015, 2022
Valur	8	7	2004, 2005, 2007, 2008, 2009, 2010, 2011, 2022	1996 (2), 2006, 2012, 2020, 2023, 2024
KR	3	5	1994, 1995, 1997	1998, 2003, 2004, 2008, 2009
Stjarnan	3	5	2012, 2015, 2023	2013, 2014, 2016, 2017, 2023
Þór/KA	2	2	2013, 2018	2011, 2019
ÍA	1	2	1992	1993, 1994
Selfoss	1	0	2020	
Víkingur	1	0	2024	
ÍBV	0	2		2005, 2018

== See also ==
- Besta deild kvenna
- Icelandic Women's Football Cup
- Icelandic Women's Football League Cup
