= Icelandic Women's Football League Cup =

Lengjubikar kvenna
- Organiser(s): KSÍ
- Founded: 1996; 30 years ago
- Region: Iceland
- Teams: 6
- Current champions: Stjarnan (5th title)
- Most championships: Breiðablik (8 titles)
- Website: KSÍ

The Icelandic Women's Football League Cup (Icelandic: Deildarbikar kvenna), known as Lengjubikar kvenna for sponsorship reasons, is a pre-season professional women's football competition in Iceland. It is considered the third most important competition in Icelandic women's football.

The pre-season tournament involves the top six clubs in Iceland from the previous season of Besta deild kvenna. It generally takes place between February and May.

== Format ==
The six teams are placed in one group, and each team plays each other once during the pool stage. The final positions of the group are determined after these five matches are played, and the top four in the group advance to the semifinal stage. From the semifinal stage, the competition becomes a single-leg knockout competition. If a match is not decided in 90 minutes, a penalty shoot-out determines the result.

== Winners ==
Total League Cup championships
Club	Titles	Year(s)
Breiðablik	8	1996, 1997, 1998, 2001, 2006, 2012, 2019, 2022
Valur	5	2003, 2005, 2007, 2010, 2017
Stjarnan	5	2011, 2013, 2014, 2015, 2023
KR	4	1999, 2000, 2002, 2008
ÍBV	2	2004, 2016
Þór/KA	2	2009, 2018

== Finals ==
List of League Cup champions
Year	Winner	Score	Runner-up
1996	Breiðablik	4–2	Valur
1997	Breiðablik	2–0	KR
1998	Breiðablik	3–2	Valur
1999	KR	4–0	Stjarnan
2000	KR	8–2	Valur
2001	Breiðablik	1–1 (4–2 p)	Valur
2002	KR	4–0	Valur
2003	Valur	4–1	Breiðablik
2004	ÍBV	3–1	Valur
2005	Valur	6–1	KR
2006	Breiðablik	2–1	Valur
2007	Valur	2–1	KR
2008	KR	4–0	Valur
2009	Þór/KA	3–2	Stjarnan
2010	Valur	2–0	Fylkir
2011	Stjarnan	2–1	Valur
2012	Breiðablik	3–2	Valur
2013	Stjarnan	4–0	Valur
2014	Stjarnan	3–0	Breiðablik
2015	Stjarnan	3−0	Breiðablik
2016	ÍBV	3−2	Breiðablik
2017	Valur	2–1	Breiðablik
2018	Þór/KA	2–2 (4–2 p)	Stjarnan
2019	Breiðablik	3–1	Valur
2020	Abandoned due to the COVID-19 pandemic.		
2021	Abandoned due to the COVID-19 pandemic.		
2022	Breiðablik	2–1	Stjarnan
2023	Stjarnan	2–2 (5–4 p)	Þór/KA

== See also ==
- Besta deild kvenna
- Icelandic Women's Football Cup
- Icelandic Women's Football Super Cup
- Icelandic Men's Football League Cup
