= Icelandic Women's Football Cup =

Bikarkeppni kvenna
- Founded: 1981
- Region: Iceland
- Current champions: Valur (15th title)
- Most championships: Valur (15 titles)
- Website: Official site (in Icelandic)
- 2024

The Icelandic Women's Football Cup (Icelandic: Bikarkeppni kvenna í knattspyrnu) is the national women's football cup competition in Iceland. The first edition of the cup was played out in 1981.

== List of finals ==
The list of finals:

| Year | Winner | Runner-up | Result |
|---|---|---|---|
| 1981 | Breiðablik | Valur | 4–0 |
| 1982 | Breiðablik | Valur | 1–1 (7–6 pen) |
| 1983 | Breiðablik | ÍA | 3–1 |
| 1984 | Valur | ÍA | 3–3 (6–4 pen) |
| 1985 | Valur | ÍA | 1–0 |
| 1986 | Valur | Breiðablik | 2–0 |
| 1987 | Valur | ÍA | 2–1 |
| 1988 | Valur | ÍA | 1–0 |
| 1989 | ÍA | Þór A. (Thor) | 3–1 |
| 1990 | Valur | ÍA | 1–0 |
| 1991 | ÍA | ÍBK | 6–0 |
| 1992 | ÍA | Breiðablik | 3–2 |
| 1993 | ÍA | Stjarnan | 3–1 |
| 1994 | Breiðablik | KR | 1–0 |
| 1995 | Valur | KR | 1–0 |
| 1996 | Breiðablik | Valur | 3–0 |
| 1997 | Breiðablik | Valur | 2–1 |
| 1998 | Breiðablik | KR | 3–2 |
| 1999 | KR | Breiðablik | 3–1 |
| 2000 | Breiðablik | KR | 1–0 |
| 2001 | Valur | Breiðablik | 2–0 |
| 2002 | KR | Valur | 4–3 |
| 2003 | Valur | ÍBV | 3–1 |
| 2004 | ÍBV | Valur | 2–0 |
| 2005 | Breiðablik | KR | 4–1 |
| 2006 | Valur | Breiðablik | 3–3 (4–1 pen) |
| 2007 | KR | Keflavík | 3–0 |
| 2008 | KR | Valur | 4–0 |
| 2009 | Valur | Breiðablik | 5–1 (aet) |
| 2010 | Valur | Stjarnan | 1–0 |
| 2011 | Valur | KR | 2–0 |
| 2012 | Stjarnan | Valur | 1–0 |
| 2013 | Breiðablik | Þór/KA | 2–1 |
| 2014 | Stjarnan | Selfoss | 4–0 |
| 2015 | Stjarnan | Selfoss | 2–1 |
| 2016 | Breiðablik | ÍBV | 3–1 |
| 2017 | ÍBV | Stjarnan | 3–2 |
| 2018 | Breiðablik | Stjarnan | 2–1 |
| 2019 | Selfoss | KR | 2–1 |
| 2020 | Cancelled due to the COVID-19 pandemic | | |
| 2021 | Breiðablik | Þróttur Reykjavík | 4–0 |
| 2022 | Valur | Breiðablik | 2–1 |
| 2023 | Víkingur | Breiðablik | 3–1 |
| 2024 | Valur | Breiðablik | 2–1 |
| 2025 | Breiðablik | FH | 3–2 (AET) |
| 2026 | Þróttur Reykjavík | Grindavík | 2–1 |

== By team ==
| Winner | Runner-up | Team (town) |
|---|---|---|
| 15 | 8 | Valur (Reykjavík) |
| 14 | 9 | Breiðablik (Kópavogur) |
| 4 | 7 | KR (Reykjavík) |
| 4 | 6 | ÍA (Akranes) |
| 3 | 4 | Stjarnan (Garðabær) |
| 2 | 2 | ÍBV (Vestmannaeyjar) |
| 1 | 2 | Selfoss |
| 1 | 0 | Víkingur (Reykjavík) |
| 0 | 2 | Keflavík (Keflavík) |
| 0 | 1 | Þór/KA (Akureyri) |
| 0 | 1 | Þór (Akureyri) |
| 1 | 1 | Þróttur Reykjavík |
| 0 | 1 | Grindavík |
| 0 | 1 | FH |

== See also ==
- Icelandic Men's Football Cup
