= Helena Ólafsdóttir =

Icelandic footballer and manager

Personal information
- Full name: Helena Ólafsdóttir
- Date of birth: 12 November 1969 (age 56)
- Place of birth: Neskaupstaður, Iceland
- Position: Striker

Youth career
- 1985–1986: Víkingur R.

Senior career*
Years	Team	Apps	(Gls)
1986–1991	KR	64	(55)
1992	ÍA	14	(9)
1993–2001	KR	105	(90)

International career
1987–1999	Iceland	8	(0)

Managerial career
- 2002–2003: Valur
- 2003–2004: Iceland
- 2005–2008: KR
- 2009–2010: Selfoss
- 2010–2012: FH
- 2012–2014: Valur
- 2014–2016: Fortuna Ålesund
- 2016–2019: ÍA
- * Club domestic league appearances and goals

Helena Ólafsdóttir (born 12 November 1969) is an Icelandic football manager and former player. A striker during her playing career, she is currently in her second spell as manager of the women's team at Valur in the Úrvalsdeild kvenna. A qualified sports teacher and personal trainer outside of football, Helena grew up in the town of Neskaupstaður before moving to Reykjavík aged 11. She started her career in the youth team at Víkingur Reykjavík before joining KR in the summer of 1986 and went on to score 55 goals in 64 league appearances for the club over the following five seasons. In 1992, she signed for ÍA and it was there that she won the first honours of her career as the side won both the Icelandic Women's Cup and the Icelandic Women's Super Cup that year. She went on to become one of the most successful female Icelandic footballers in history, winning four league titles and six cup winners' medals during her career.

Helena returned to KR as club captain ahead of the 1993 season and success followed as the team won their first ever Úrvalsdeild championship, before winning the Women's Super Cup on consecutive occasions in 1994 and 1995. After missing the majority of the 1996 campaign following the birth of her son, Helena returned to playing in 1997 and helped KR to the first of three successive league titles. She continued playing until the end of the 2001 season before retiring to embark on a career in management. At the time of her retirement, she was ranked in the all-time top four for both appearances and goals in the Icelandic women's leagues.

In 2002, Helena undertook her first managerial appointment at Valur and guided the team to a Women's Cup success in 2003. The same year, she was hired as manager of the Icelandic women's national football team but she was sacked after a year in charge due to the country's failure to qualify for the 2005 UEFA Women's Championship. Helena returned to her former club KR as manager in 2005 and led the side to two Women's Cup titles during her three years in charge. After spending a year away from football, she returned to management with second-tier outfit Selfoss in 2009. Her spell at the helm lasted one year before she was appointed manager of FH in October 2010. The Hafnarfjörður club won promotion to the Úrvalsdeild at the end of the 2011 season, but Helena resigned as FH manager in July 2012 following an indifferent start to the following campaign. In September 2012, it was announced that she would return to her first managerial post at Valur for the 2013 season.

== Biography ==
Helena was born on 12 November 1969, the only daughter of Ólafur Hauksson and Guðbjörg Svala Guðjónsdóttir. She grew up in the small town of Neskaupstaður on the east side of Iceland, before moving to the capital city, Reykjavík, at the age of 11. She is a qualified sports teacher, having graduated from the Íþróttakennaraskóli Íslands in Laugarvatn in 1992. After graduation she taught at the Hagaskóli in Vesturbær for a year and later worked at the Hólabrekkuskóli in Breiðholt for over a decade. She has one son, Ólafur Daði, who was born in 1996. In 2008, she qualified as a personal trainer, before becoming a CrossFit trainer the following year.

== Playing career ==
After playing in the youth team at Víkingur Reykjavík, Helena started her senior career with KR in the summer of 1986. She progressed quickly, establishing herself as a first-team regular, and at the 1987 end-of-season awards she was named the most promising player in Icelandic women's football. She spent the first five years of her career with KR, her most prolific season for the side coming in 1991 when she scored 11 goals in 14 league matches. Following five years with KR, Helena transferred to Akranes-based club ÍA ahead of the 1992 season. During her single summer with ÍA, Helena netted 11 times in 18 league and cup appearances as the team finished as runners-up in the 1. deild kvenna and won the Icelandic Women's Cup, beating Breiðablik 3–2 in the final. On 16 June 1992, she scored twice as ÍA beat the same club 3–0 in the final of the inaugural Icelandic Women's Super Cup.

Helena rejoined KR ahead of the 1993 season. She was appointed club captain and her return to Reykjavík coincided with the club winning its first ever Úrvalsdeild kvenna title that summer. She scored 9 goals for KR and played all 12 league matches as the side went through the campaign undefeated to finish four points clear of runners-up Breiðablik. During the following season, Helena netted 16 goals in 12 matches, including a five-goal haul in the 18–0 win against Haukar on 9 July 1994, as KR finished second in the division behind Breiðablik. She scored seven goals in four games as KR also reached the final of the Women's Cup before losing 0–1 to the same club. Despite these disappointments, KR won the Women's Super Cup by defeating ÍA, the 1993 Women's Cup winners, 3–1 at the Ásvellir on 17 May 1994.

The team defended the trophy the following year, beating Breiðablik 1–0 in the final. However, they performed below expectations in the league with a fourth-place finish, winning 8 of their 14 matches. Nevertheless, Helena was again the top goalscorer for KR netting 10 times in 14 appearances, one goal more than fellow striker Olga Færseth. She missed almost the whole of the 1996 season following the birth of her son, Ólafur, only returning for the final match of the Úrvalsdeild campaign, a 5–0 home win over ÍBA. She scored the final goal of the game six minutes from time after coming on as a second-half subsitiute for Ásdís Þorgilsdóttir. Helena returned to the side full-time for the 1997 season and ended the campaign with a record of more than one goal per game as KR won all 14 of their league matches to secure their second Icelandic championship. She was also instrumental in the side regaining the Women's Super Cup the same year, scoring the team's first goal in the 3–1 victory against Breiðablik on 20 September 1997.

Over the next two years KR established themselves as the strongest club in Icelandic women's football, retaining the Úrvalsdeild title in both the 1998 and 1999 seasons. Helena scored 12 league goals in 1998, the team's second highest scorer behind Olga Færseth who ended the campaign with a tally of 23, before setting a career-best total of 19 goals the following season as the KR again went undefeated in the league, amassing 72 goals in only 14 matches. In 1999, the team also won the Icelandic Women's Cup for the first time in its history, defeating Breiðablik 3–1 in the final at the Laugardalsvöllur, the country's national stadium, on 12 September.

By 2000, Helena had become less of an integral part of the KR side, only twice playing the full 90 minutes of a league match, and began to share captain duties with Guðrún Jóna Kristjánsdóttir. The team could not retain the Úrvalsdeild crown for a third successive season, finishing as runners-up to Breiðablik. The following season, Helena was selected in the starting line-up for less than half of the team's matches, although she did appear in every game and scored five goals during the campaign. At the end of the summer of 2001, after a 15-year playing career, Helena retired from playing football in order to move into management. In total, she had played 193 league matches, placing her fourth in the all-time Icelandic women's league appearances list, and was the third-highest league goalscorer in the country's history with 154 league goals.

== International appearances ==
Helena received her first call-up to the Iceland women's national football team in September 1987, when she was selected in the squad for the two matches against West Germany by manager Aðalsteinn Örnólfsson. She made her international debut on 4 September, playing the whole match as Iceland were beaten 5–0. She was also selected to start in the second match of the tour two days later as West Germany won for a second time. It was almost five years before Helena was selected to play for her country again when she was included in the squad for the 1993 UEFA Women's Championship qualifiers against England and Scotland in May 1992. She was an unused substitute in the first of the two matches, but played the first hour of the goalless draw against Scotland before being replaced by Ragna Lóa Stefánsdóttir. Helena played once more for her country that year, featuring in the return match against England in Iceland.

During the following two seasons Helena made a further three appearances for Iceland, including the 1995 UEFA Women's Championship qualifying match against Greece on 29 May 1994. Iceland topped their group to progress to the second qualifying round, in which they were drawn against England. However, Helena did not play in either the home or away fixture as England won 4–2 on aggregate to qualify for the final tournament. She won her eighth and final cap for Iceland more than five years later, coming on as a late substitute for Sigrún Sigríður Óttarsdóttir in the 0–5 defeat to Germany on 14 October 1999.

== Coaching career ==
Helena began her career as a football coach in 1989, training various KR youth teams during her time as a player at the club. During the 1996 season, she took charge of the team for both league matches against Afturelding in place of Gísli Jón Magnússon. In October 2001, after her retirement from playing, she was hired as the manager of top-flight side Valur for the following season. During her first year in charge, she guided the team to a third-place finish in the Úrvalsdeild and the final of the Icelandic Women's Cup, although they were beaten 4–3 by KR. On 11 February 2003, Helena was appointed manager of the Icelandic women's national football team on a two-year contract, taking over from Jörundur Áki Sveinsson, who was leaving to coach Breiðablik. She continued to coach Valur despite taking the national team job, and led the club to another third-place league finish at the end of the 2003 campaign. The team also reached the cup final for the second consecutive season and on 17 August 2003 they defeated ÍBV 3–1 to win their ninth cup title.

On 4 September 2003, it was announced that Helena had quit as Valur coach to concentrate on managing the Icelandic national team, despite being asked to stay with the club. She led Iceland through the qualification campaign for the 2005 UEFA Women's Championship as the team won four of their eight matches, including a 10–0 victory over Poland, to finish third in their group. The team consequently progressed to the play-off round, where they were beaten 9–3 on aggregate over two legs by Norway. During 2004, the side also played a number of friendly internationals, including a short two-match tour of America, during which they played against the United States. It was confirmed on 7 December 2004 that Helena would not continue as Iceland manager after her contract expired, with KSÍ chairman Eggert Magnússon stating his disappointment at failing to qualify for the Euro tournament. The departure proved unpopular with supporters; in one poll of almost 1,000 fans, more than 80 per cent disagreed with the decision of the KSÍ.

Before the start of the 2005 season, Helena agreed a deal to return to her former club KR as manager of the women's team later that year in place of Íris Eysteinsdóttir, who was to take maternity leave. Helena took charge of the team on 4 August 2005, initially on a temporary basis until the end of the campaign. The same evening, she led KR to a 7–0 win against FH, although this was to be the last victory of the season as KR went on to finish in fourth place. The team was then defeated in the Women's Cup final on 10 September 2005, losing 4–1 to Breiðablik. On 29 October 2005, she was appointed manager of KR on a permanent deal, signing a two-year contract with the club. She guided the side to a fourth-place finish in the Úrvalsdeild in 2006, despite the team winning by ten or more goals on four occasions. A number of new signings were made ahead of the 2007 campaign including Edda Garðarsdóttir and Ólína Viðarsdóttir, who both arrived from Breiðablik. The team improved by two places on their previous league position, finishing as runners-up at the end of the season. KR lost only one league game in 2007, suffering a 4–2 defeat against eventual league winners Valur, who went through the campaign unbeaten.

The build-up to the 2008 campaign went well for KR. Firstly, the team won the Reykjavik Tournament after beating Fjölnir 1–0 in the final, although Helena was not present at the match. This was followed by success in the Icelandic League Cup after a 4–0 victory over Valur in the final. Helena stated that she hoped the cup win would provide a basis for a promising Úrvalsdeild campaign. Two new signings, those of Iceland international players Guðrún Sóley Gunnarsdóttir and María Björg Ágústsdóttir, were made during the close season and the team was tipped to be crowned Icelandic champions in 2008. However, the league season proved to be similar to the previous year as KR again finished second in the league behind Valur despite winning 16 of their 18 fixtures. On 9 September 2008, Helena announced that she would not continue to manage the team for the following season as she wished to take a year out from football.

After spending the 2009 season without a club, it was announced in October of that year that Helena would take charge of 1. deild kvenna side Selfoss for the 2010 campaign. The club had only joined the Icelandic women's league in 2009 and had finished third in the division during its first year in the second tier. Selfoss made 16 new signings during the close season, including former Iceland under-17 internationals Anna Þorsteinsdóttir, who arrived from Þróttur, and Aníta Guðlaugsdóttir. Helena led Selfoss to an 8–0 home win over Höttur in her first league match in charge and the team continued their good form, winning their first 13 games of the season. The team also reached the third round of the Icelandic Women's Cup before being knocked out by Úrvalsdeild side FH. Selfoss won all but one of their league matches to finish second in Group B and qualify for the promotion play-offs at the end of the campaign. The play-offs consisted of two matches against Þróttur, who had finished as runners-up in Group A. Selfoss lost 4–1 on aggregate over the two legs, drawing 1–1 at home before suffering a 3–1 defeat at the Valbjarnarvöllur.

On 1 October 2010, Helena was appointed manager of the women's team at FH for the following season. She replaced Jón Þór Brandsson, who had left following the club's relegation from the Úrvalsdeild at the end of the 2010 campaign. The team began the 2011 season well with a 4–0 away win at Álftanes. They also performed well in the cup competition, beating both HK/Víkingur and ÍA to reach the last 8, before being knocked out by top division side Fylkir. In June 2011, Helena was one of 35 Icelandic coaches to graduate with a UEFA A coaching license, the second highest qualification in European football. FH continued their league form, winning all 12 of their group matches to qualify for the end-of-season play-offs. In the semi-finals, FH defeated Haukar 14–1 on aggregate over two matches to progress to the final against Helena's former club Selfoss. On 3 September 2011, they recorded a 6–2 win against Selfoss to secure promotion to the Úrvalsdeild for the 2012 season. After the match, Helena expressed her delight at winning the 1. deild, but was aware of the challenges ahead in preparing to play in a higher division. In the end of season awards, Helena was named 1. deild kvenna Manager of the Season, while four FH players were selected in the Team of the Year.

Ahead of the new campaign, only one player left the club while six new signings, including Northern Irish forward Sarah McFadden, arrived at the club. FH took a point from their first league match of the season, conceding a last-minute equaliser in a 1–1 draw against Afturelding. This was followed by a 4–1 win against ÍBV. However, the team lost five and won only one of their next six matches. On 16 July 2012, it was announced that Helena had resigned as manager of FH with the team in seventh place in the Úrvalsdeild. Her assistant, former Iceland international Guðrún Jóna Kristjánsdóttir, was subsequently appointed to take charge of the team on a temporary basis.

Valur announced on 19 September 2012 that Helena had agreed to return to the club for a second spell as manager for the 2013 season following the departure of Gunnar Borgþórsson.

On September 4, 2016, Helena was hired as manager of ÍA. In July 2019, she stepped down as manager along with her assistant manager, Aníta Lísa Svansdóttir.

== Honours ==
=== Player ===
KR

- Úrvalsdeild kvenna: 1993, 1997, 1998, 1999
- Icelandic Women's Cup: 1999
- Icelandic Women's Super Cup: 1994, 1995, 1997

ÍA

- Icelandic Women's Cup: 1992
- Icelandic Women's Super Cup: 1992

=== Manager ===
Valur

- Icelandic Women's Cup: 2003

KR

- Icelandic Women's Cup: 2007, 2008

FH

- 1. deild kvenna: 2011
