= Mist Edvardsdóttir =

Icelandic footballer

Personal information
- Date of birth: 17 October 1990 (age 36)
- Place of birth: Iceland
- Position: Defender

Team information
- Current team: Valur

Senior career*
Years	Team	Apps	(Gls)
2007–2008	Afturelding	29	(10)
2009–2010	KR	25	(2)
2011–2012	Valur	35	(7)
2012–2013	Avaldsnes IL	15	(2)
2013–2013	Vitória	2	(0)
2014–	Valur	62	(11)

International career^{‡}
2009	Iceland U19	6	(0)
2012	Iceland U23	1	(0)
2010–2015	Iceland	13	(1)
- * Club domestic league appearances and goals as of 22 April 2021 ‡ National team caps and goals as of 22 April 2021

Mist Edvardsdóttir (born 17 October 1990) is an Icelandic footballer who plays as a defender for Valur in the Icelandic top-tier Úrvalsdeild kvenna. She was a member of the Icelandic national team, appearing in 13 matches from 2010 to 2015. Over her career she has battled and recovered from Hodgkin's lymphoma and three separate anterior cruciate ligament tears.

== Club career ==
Mist started her career with Afturelding in the 1. deild kvenna at the age of 16 and later played two seasons for KR before signing with Valur in 2011. She played for Avaldsnes IL in 2013 and in October the same year, she signed with Brazilian club Vitória.

After her stint with Vitória, Mist returned to Valur in 2014. In June 2014, she was diagnosed with Hodgkin's lymphoma. Despite undergoing chemotherapy, Mist appeared in 15 of Valur's 18 matches during the season, missing one game due to being suspended after receiving a red card and the last two games after becoming too ill to play. By January 2015, the cancer was in remission and she played in all 18 matches during the 2018 season.

In January 2017, Mist tore her left ACL during practice and was expected to miss all of the upcoming season. In November 2017, Mist signed a three-year contract extension with Valur. In March 2018, on her second full practice since the injury, she tore the same ACL again. She returned for the 2019 season and appeared in eight Úrvalsdeild matches before tearing her ACL once again, this time in her right knee. In 2020, Mist returned to the field with Valur. On 26 September 2020, she scored four goals in a 7–0 victory against third-placed Fylkir.

She had a standout season with Valur in 2021 and helped the team to the national championship.

On 21 September 2022, in a game against Slavia Prague, Mist suffered the fourth anterior cruciate ligament tear of her career, ending her season.

== Titles ==
- Icelandic Championships:

- 2019, 2021, 2022

- Icelandic Cup:

- 2011, 2022

- Icelandic Super Cup:

- 2010, 2011, 2022
