= Þórdís Hrönn Sigfúsdóttir =

Icelandic footballer (born 1993)

Personal information
- Full name: Þórdís Hrönn Sigfúsdóttir
- Date of birth: 19 November 1993 (age 32)
- Place of birth: Kópavogur, Iceland
- Position: Midfielder

Team information
- Current team: Valur
- Number: 17

Senior career*
Years	Team	Apps	(Gls)
2009–2013	Breiðablik	55	(13)
2014–2015	Älta IF	47	(22)
2016–2018	Stjarnan	30	(9)
2019	Kristianstads	5	(1)
2019	→ Þór/KA (loan)	13	(2)
2020	KR	13	(0)
2021–2022	Breiðablik	7	(1)
2021	→ Apollon (loan)	8	(6)
2022–2025	Valur	27	(6)
2025–	Knattspyrnufélagið	0	(0)

International career^{‡}
2009	Iceland U16	6	(2)
2009	Iceland U17	3	(2)
2010–2012	Iceland U19	18	(3)
2012–2015	Iceland U23	2	(0)
2019–	Iceland	2	(0)
- * Club domestic league appearances and goals as of 17:03, 29 August 2025 (UTC) ‡ National team caps and goals as of 19:35, 5 March 2021 (UTC)

Þórdís Hrönn Sigfúsdóttir (born 19 November 1993, sometimes anglicised as Thórdís Hrönn Sigfúsdóttir) is an Icelandic footballer who plays for Knattspyrnufélagið Fram. She has made two appearances for the Iceland women's national football team.

== Club career ==
From 2009 to 2013, Þórdís Hrönn played for Icelandic Úrvalsdeild kvenna club Breiðablik. In March 2014, Þórdís Hrönn signed for Swedish Elitettan side Älta IF. In October 2014, she signed a one-year contract extension with Älta IF. In 2016, Þórdís Hrönn signed for Icelandic Úrvalsdeild kvenna team Stjarnan, and she played for them until 2018, when she joined Swedish Damallsvenskan club Kristianstads DFF. In May 2019, Þórdís was loaned to Þór/KA for two months, during the Swedish league offseason. Her loan was later extended until the end of the season, and whilst at Þór/KA, Þórdís Hrönn announced that she would not be returning to Kristianstads after her loan expired.

In 2020, Þórdís Hrönn signed for Iceland club Knattspyrnufélag Reykjavíkur (KR). Þórdís Hrönn was supportive of the 2020 Úrvalsdeild kvenna being ended early due to an increase of COVID-19 cases in Iceland. In 2021, Þórdís Hrönn re-signed for Breiðablik, on a two-year contract. In July 2021, she was loaned to Cypriot club Apollon for the rest of the season. She scored six goals in eight league appearances for Apollon, and also made four appearances for the club in the 2021–22 UEFA Women's Champions League. She returned to Breiðablik ahead of the 2022 Besta-deild kvenna, before signing for Valur in February 2022.

She missed the entire 2023 season with a knee injury, and played 11 games for Valur in 2024. In March 2025, she signed for Knattspyrnufélagið Fram.

== International career ==
Þórdís Hrönn has made 29 appearances for Iceland junior national teams and two appearances for the Iceland women's national football team. Both senior appearances were in friendly matches against South Korea in 2019. She was in the Iceland squad for the 2019 Algarve Cup; she was on the bench for three matches of the tournament, but did not make any appearances.

== Personal life ==
Þórdís Hrönn was born in Kópavogur, Iceland. Aside from football, she works in a hospital. During the COVID-19 pandemic, Þórdís Hrönn had to self-isolate four times. In March 2020, Þórdís Hrönn was forced to quarantine as she worked in a hospital. The next two quarantines were because of close contact with KR footballers who tested positive. The fourth time was after being a close contact of a KR coach who tested positive. It was the third time that the KR squad went into isolation.

== Honours ==
- 2013 Icelandic Women's Football Cup
- 2016 Úrvalsdeild kvenna
