= Kristín Ýr Bjarnadóttir =

Icelandic footballer

Personal information
- Full name: Kristín Ýr Bjarnadóttir
- Date of birth: 1 February 1984 (age 42)
- Place of birth: Iceland
- Position: Striker

Team information
- Current team: Valur
- Number: 12

Senior career*
Years	Team	Apps	(Gls)
2001–2004	Valur	50	(30)
2007	Afturelding	0	(0)
2008–2011	Valur	65	(66)
2012	Avaldsnes IL	22	(24)
2013–2016	Valur	38	(6)
2015	→ HK/Víkingur (loan)	6	(5)
2018	Augnablik	9	(2)

International career^{‡}
2000–2001	Iceland U-17	8	(0)
2001–2002	Iceland U-19	5	(2)
2003–2004	Iceland U-21	3	(0)
2009–2012	Iceland	5	(1)
- * Club domestic league appearances and goals as of 8 May 2021 ‡ National team caps and goals as of 8 May 2021

Kristín Ýr Bjarnadóttir (born 1 February 1984) is an Icelandic former footballer who played as a striker.

== Football ==
=== Club career ===
Kristín was a squad member of Iceland women's national team at UEFA Women's Euro 2009. She was the top scorer for Valur in 2001 and 2003 but got badly injured in 2004 and quit football after that. She made a comeback with Afturelding in 2007 without playing for them and then transferring back to Valur for the 2008 season. She was the top scorer in Iceland in both 2009 and 2010 with 23 league goals in 18 games in both seasons. She played for Avaldsnes IL in Norway for the 2012 season but returned to Valur for 2013.

=== International career ===
Kristín first represented Iceland at Under-17 level, making her debut against Germany in July 2000. She played eight times at Under-17 level before making her debut at Under-19 level in September 2001, scoring the final goal in a 7–0 win over Bulgaria. In 2003, she stepped up to Under-21 level, making her debut in March against Sweden. She also played in the Under-21 games against Denmark and Germany in July 2004, before dropping out of football due to a serious back injury sustained in a car accident.

Following her return to action with Valur, Kristín was called into Iceland's UEFA Women's Euro 2009 squad as a late replacement for Harpa Þorsteinsdóttir, who had a broken leg. She did not play in the tournament but made her debut for the Iceland senior women's team on 17 September 2009, coming on as a late substitute for Dóra María Lárusdóttir as Iceland mauled Estonia 12–0. She was again a late substitute, this time for Margrét Lára Viðarsdóttir in the following game, a 1–0 win in Northern Ireland.

=== Achievements ===
- Icelandic champion (4): 2004, 2008, 2009 and 2010.
- Icelandic cup (4):
- Úrvalsdeild kvenna top goal scorer in (2): 2009, 2010

== Personal life ==
Kristín was a member of the band Igore, who released 9 líf (9 lives), their only album to date, in 2004. As her alter ego Kido, Kristín was a rapper and the group's main lyricist. In 2018, she released the single "Ég Sé Þig".
