= Vanda Sigurgeirsdóttir =

Icelandic multi-sport athlete

10th Chairman of the Football Association of Iceland
- In office 2021–2024
- Preceded by: Guðni Bergsson
- Succeeded by: Þorvaldur Örlygsson

Personal details
- Born: 28 June 1965 (age 61) Sauðárkrókur, Iceland
Association football career
Senior career*
Years	Team	Apps	(Gls)
1982	KA		
1983–1989	ÍA		(23)
1990–1996	Breiðablik	87	(12)
2003	KR	0	(0)
2007–2008	Tindastóll	10	(0)
International career
1985–1996	Iceland	37	(1)
Managerial career
- 1994–1996: Breiðablik
- 1997–1998: Iceland
- 2001: Neisti Hofsósi
- 2002–2003: KR
- 2007: Tindastóll
- 2008: Breiðablik
- 2010–2011: Breiðablik (assistant)
- 2013: Þróttur Reykjavík
- * Club domestic league appearances and goals

Halldóra Vanda Sigurgeirsdóttir (born 28 June 1965) is an Icelandic former multi-sport athlete who played both for the Icelandic national football team and the Icelandic national basketball team. In 2001 she became the first woman in Iceland to coach a men's football team when she was hired as the manager of Neisti Hofsósi. In 2020, she was awarded the Order of the Falcon for her work towards women's football. In 2021, she became the first female chairman of the Football Association of Iceland.

== Early life ==
Vanda started playing football at an early age with the boys team of Ungmennafélag Tindastóll. When she moved to Akureyri to study at the Menntaskólinn á Akureyri, she played with a women's team for the first time.

== Football ==
=== Club career ===
Vanda started her senior team career with Knattspyrnufélag Akureyrar in 1982 in the second-tier league. She went on to play several seasons in the Icelandic top-tier Úrvalsdeild kvenna with ÍA and Breiðablik. Her last game was on 21 June 2008 when she was called into Tindastóll's squad an hour before its game against Höttur due to an injury to Tindastóll's goalkeeper. It was the first time in her career that she had played the goalkeeper position.

=== National team career ===
From 1985 to 1996, Vanda played 37 matches for the Icelandic national football team, scoring one goal. She was the captain of the team for 28 matches.

=== Executive career ===
On 2 October 2021, Vanda became the first female chairman of the Football Association of Iceland.

=== Titles ===
- Icelandic championships: 1984, 1985, 1987, 1990, 1991, 1992, 1994, 1995, 1996
- Icelandic Women's Football Cup: 1989, 1994, 1996

=== Awards ===
- Úrvalsdeild kvenna Player of the Year: 1990

== Basketball ==
Vanda Sigurgeirsdóttir
Career information
- Playing career: 1986–1992
- Position: Guard

Career history
- 1986–1991: ÍS
- 1992: ÍS

Career highlights
- Icelandic champion (1991); Icelandic Basketball Cup (1991)
Medals
Women's basketball
Representing Iceland
Games of the Small States of Europe
Bronze medal – third place	1991 Andorra	Team

=== Club career ===
Vanda played basketball for several seasons with Íþróttafélag Stúdenta. She was a key player in the ÍS team that won the national championship and the Icelandic Cup in 1991.

=== National team career ===
She played 9 games for the Icelandic national basketball team from 1989 to 1991. She helped the team to Bronze at the 1991 Games of the Small States of Europe.
