= Ólafsdóttir =

Ólafsdóttir is an Icelandic patronymic. Notable people with the name include:

- Alda Olafsdottir, known as simply Alda, Icelandic pop singer and songwriter
- Anna Mjöll Ólafsdóttir, Icelandic jazz singer and songwriter
- Anna Ólafsdóttir (1932–2013), Icelandic former swimmer
- Auður Ava Ólafsdóttir (born 1958), Icelandic professor of art history, a novelist, playwright and poet
- Auður Íris Ólafsdóttir (born 1992), Icelandic basketball coach and player, former member of the Icelandic national basketball team
- Björt Ólafsdóttir, Icelandic politician who represented Bright Future in the Althing 2013–17
- Bryndís Ólafsdóttir (born 1969), retired Icelandic freestyle swimmer
- Doris Olafsdóttir (born 1986), Faroese former footballer
- Edda Run Olafsdottir (born 1978), a founding member of Amiina, an Icelandic band
- Gyrid Olafsdottir, according to legends a Swedish princess and a Danish queen consort as the spouse of King Harald Bluetooth of Denmark
- Helena Ólafsdóttir (born 1969), Icelandic football manager and former player
- Kolbrún Ólafsdóttir (1933–1960), Icelandic swimmer
- Laufey Ólafsdóttir, Icelandic football midfielder
- María Ólafsdóttir (born 1993), Icelandic singer, musician, and actress
- Sigrún Björg Ólafsdóttir (born 2001), Icelandic basketball player
- Þorgerður Ólafsdóttir, Icelandic visual artist
- Thuridur Olafsdottir (died 1678), alleged Icelandic witch
