= Guðrún Sóley Gunnarsdóttir =

Icelandic footballer (born 1982)

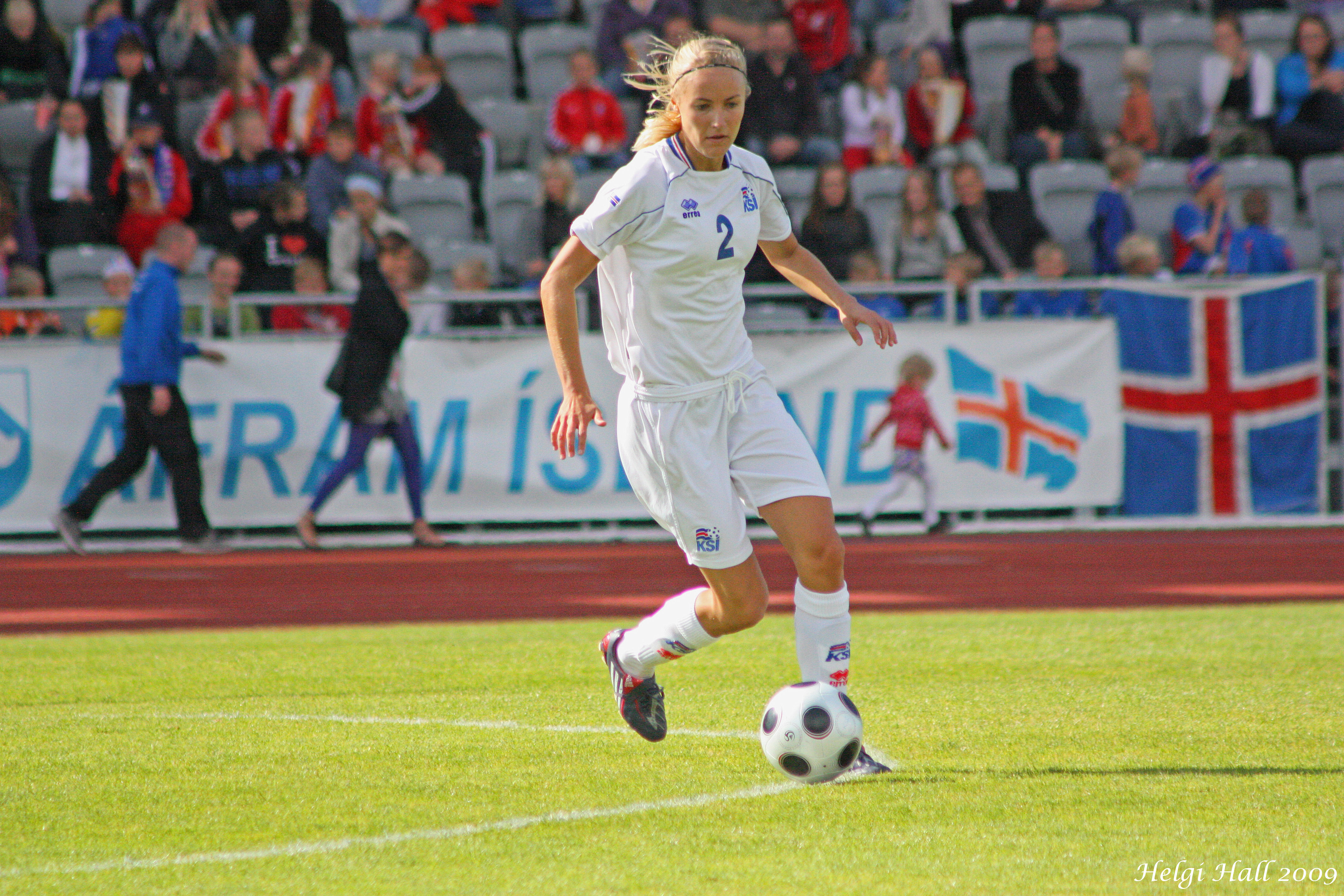
- Guðrún playing for Iceland in 2009

Personal information
- Full name: Guðrún Sóley Gunnarsdóttir
- Date of birth: 15 September 1981 (age 45)
- Place of birth: Iceland
- Position: Defender

College career
Years	Team	Apps	(Gls)
2001–2004	Notre Dame Fighting Irish	66	(0)

Senior career*
Years	Team	Apps	(Gls)
1996–2005	KR	97	(8)
2006–2007	Breiðablik	27	(6)
2008	KR	18	(2)
2009	→ Djurgården (loan)	17	(2)

International career^{‡}
1996–1998	Iceland U-17	13	(0)
1997–1999	Iceland U-19	7	(3)
1998–2000	Iceland U-21	17	(0)
1999–2009	Iceland	65	(1)
- * Club domestic league appearances and goals as of 16 August 2009 ‡ National team caps and goals as of 30 August 2009

Guðrún Sóley Gunnarsdóttir (born 15 September 1982) is an Icelandic former football defender who was part of Iceland's national team and competed at UEFA Women's Euro 2009. Guðrún was the captain of Breiðablik and also played in Sweden's Damallsvenskan for Djurgårdens IF Dam. During her career she won the Icelandic championship five times and the Icelandic Cup three times. In 2004, she won the NCAA championship with the Notre Dame Fighting Irish.

== Club career ==
Named in the Icelandic Úrvalsdeild's team of the year nine times, Guðrún was also named KR Reykjavík's player of the season in 2008. She had simultaneously completed a scholarship at the University of Notre Dame, where she played varsity soccer for the "Fighting Irish". For the 2009 season, Guðrún went on loan to Djurgårdens IF Dam in Sweden, where she joined compatriot Guðbjörg Gunnarsdóttir.

Guðrún played well in Sweden and was reportedly subject to approaches from Chicago Red Stars and Sky Blue FC of the American Women's Professional Soccer (WPS). A head injury sustained at UEFA Women's Euro 2009 proved more serious than anticipated and caused Guðrún's premature retirement from football. It was reported in July 2013 that she was contemplating a comeback with KR.

== International career ==
Guðrún's senior international debut for Iceland was on 14 October 1999, in a 5–0 defeat by Germany.

== Personal life ==
A reader poll by Finnish newspaper Ilta-Sanomat saw Guðrún voted the most beautiful player at UEFA Women's Euro 2009, with more than twice as many votes as runner-up Kosovare Asllani. Since 2009 she has worked as an investment banker, with Sveriges Riksbank then Central Bank of Iceland.

== Achievements ==
- Five times Icelandic champion
- Three times Icelandic cup winner

== Honours ==
- Player of the Year in Breiðablik in 2007.
- Player of the Year in KR in 2008.
- Sport Person of the Year in Seltjarnarnes in 1999.
