= Ashley Bares =

American soccer player and coach (born 1989)

Personal information
- Date of birth: March 17, 1989 (age 37)
- Place of birth: Belgium, Wisconsin, United States
- Height: 1.75 m (5 ft 9 in)
- Position: Forward

Youth career
- 2004–2007: Ozaukee HS

College career
Years	Team	Apps	(Gls)
- Marquette Golden Eagles

Senior career*
Years	Team	Apps	(Gls)
2010	Chicago Red Eleven		
2011–2012	Stjarnan	36	(31)

Managerial career
- 2013–2019: Marquette Golden Eagles (asst.)
- 2020–: Iowa State Cyclones (asst.)
- * Club domestic league appearances and goals

Ashley Bares (born March 17, 1989) is a former American women's soccer coach and player who most recently served as an assistant coach for the Iowa State Cyclones women's soccer team. As a player, she was a forward for Icelandic club Stjarnan of the professional top-division Úrvalsdeild kvenna, where she won the league, the league's golden boot, the Icelandic Women's Football Cup, and the Icelandic Women's Football Super Cup.

== Youth career ==
Bares is from Belgium, Wisconsin. She began playing soccer when she was four years old, following her older sister. She attended Ozaukee High School in Fredonia from 2004 to 2007. Playing for the school's girls' soccer team, she scored 72 goals and 157 points in her 2006 season, setting state records that lasted until being broken by Taylor Shad in 2022, and scored 224 career goals and 505 career points, both state records among both boys and girls that remained intact as of June 29, 2023. She scored seven goals in a game against St. Mary Central in 2005 and eight goals in the state tournament in 2005, also state records as of 2022.

== College career ==
Bares played NCAA Division I women's soccer for the Marquette Golden Eagles from 2007 to 2010. She scored 19 goals and was credited with 10 assists in 86 appearances. She left in 2011 before completing her coursework to play professionally, then returned in 2012 to graduate with a bachelor's degree in social welfare and justice in August 2013.

Bares suffered two concussions while playing for Marquette, resulting in lingering health issues in subsequent years.

== Club career ==
Bares played for Chicago Red Eleven of the USL W-League in 2010.

An agent connected Bares to Bares played for Stjarnan in Iceland's Úrvalsdeild kvenna in November, after the end of Marquette's 2010 season. from 2011 to 2012. After scoring 11 goals in her first nine rounds at the club, including a six-minute match-winning hat-trick against Breiðablik on July 12, 2011, the league named her its best player on July 15. The following week, she scored four goals in a match against Þróttur Reykjavík.

Her 21 league goals led the 2011 Úrvalsdeild kvenna, making Bares the first foreign player to win the league's Golden Boot. Stjarnan won fifteen consecutive matches on the season, a top-division record, and completed a domestic double by winning both the league and the Icelandic Women's Football Cup. The league named Bares its foreign player of the year and an all-star player.

After completing a one-year contract, Bares agreed on November 30, 2011, to return to Stjarnan for a second season. She made two appearances for Stjarnan in the 2012–13 UEFA Women's Champions League and scored a goal in the 2012 Icelandic Women's Football Super Cup in May, which Stjarnan won 3–1 for its first Super Cup victory. Bares scored a hat-trick against Selfoss on July 10, 2012, and finished the league season with 10 goals, second on the team to Harpa Þorsteinsdóttir, in 18 appearances. Stjarnan finished third in the league.

== Coaching career ==
Bares began coaching as a volunteer assistant at Marquette soccer camps and Stjarnan club teams during her playing career, then became an assistant coach at Marquette in August 2013, where she served as a recruiting coordinator, camp director, and instructor until 2019.

In January 2020, Iowa State Cyclones women's soccer head coach Matt Fannon hired Bares as an assistant coach. As of 2021, Bares was no longer on the Iowa State Cyclones coaching staff.

== Honors ==
Marquette Golden Eagles

As player:

- All-Big East Conference first team: 2010

As coach:

- Big East Conference regular season: 2013, 2016
- Big East Conference Coaching Staff of the Year: 2013, 2016

Stjarnan

- Úrvalsdeild kvenna: 2011
- Úrvalsdeild kvenna Golden Boot: 2011
- Úrvalsdeild kvenna Foreign Player of the Year: 2011
- Icelandic Women's Football Cup: 2011
- Icelandic Women's Football Super Cup: 2012
