= Laufey =

Laufey may refer to:

== Mythology ==
- Laufey (mythology), a figure in Norse mythology

== Fictional characters ==
- Laufey (Marvel Comics), a Marvel Comics character introduced 1965
  - Laufey (Marvel Cinematic Universe), a fictional character introduced 2011
- Laufey (God of War), character from the God of War franchise

== People ==
- Laufey (singer) (born 1999), Icelandic singer born Laufey Lín Bing Jónsdóttir
- Laufey Ámundadóttir (born 1962), Icelandic cell biologist
- Laufey Ólafsdóttir (born 1981), Icelandic footballer
- Laufey Sigurðardóttir (born 1963), Icelandic footballer
- Laufey Valdimarsdóttir (1890–1945), Icelandic women's rights activist
