= 2022 Besta deild kvenna =

Besta deild kvenna
- Season: 2022
- Dates: 26 April – 1 October

The 2022 Besta deild kvenna was the 51st season of the women's association football highest division league in Iceland. Valur were the defending champions after claiming the 2021 championship.

== Teams ==
The 2021 Úrvalsdeild kvenna is contested by 10 teams, eight of which played in the division the previous season and two promoted from the 2021 1. deild kvenna. The bottom two teams from the previous season, Tindastóll and Fylkir were relegated to the 1. deild kvenna and were replaced by KR and Afturelding, the winner and runners-up of the 2021 1. deild kvenna respectively.

| Team | Location | Stadium | Capacity |
|---|---|---|---|
| Afturelding | Mosfellsbær | Fagverksvöllurinn Varmá | 1,000 |
| Breiðablik | Kópavogur | Kópavogsvöllur | 5,501 |
| Keflavík | Keflavík | Keflavíkurvöllur | 4,000 |
| KR | Reykjavík | KR-völlur | 2,781 |
| ÍBV | Vestmannaeyjar | Hásteinsvöllur | 3,034 |
| Selfoss | Selfoss | Selfossvöllur | 950 |
| Stjarnan | Garðabær | Samsung völlurinn | 2,300 |
| Þróttur | Reykjavík | Valbjarnarvöllur | 5,478 |
| Valur | Reykjavík | Valsvöllur | 2,465 |
| Þór/KA | Akureyri | Þórsvöllur | 1,550 |
