= Hrefna Huld Jóhannesdóttir =

Icelandic footballer

Hrefna Jóhannesdóttir
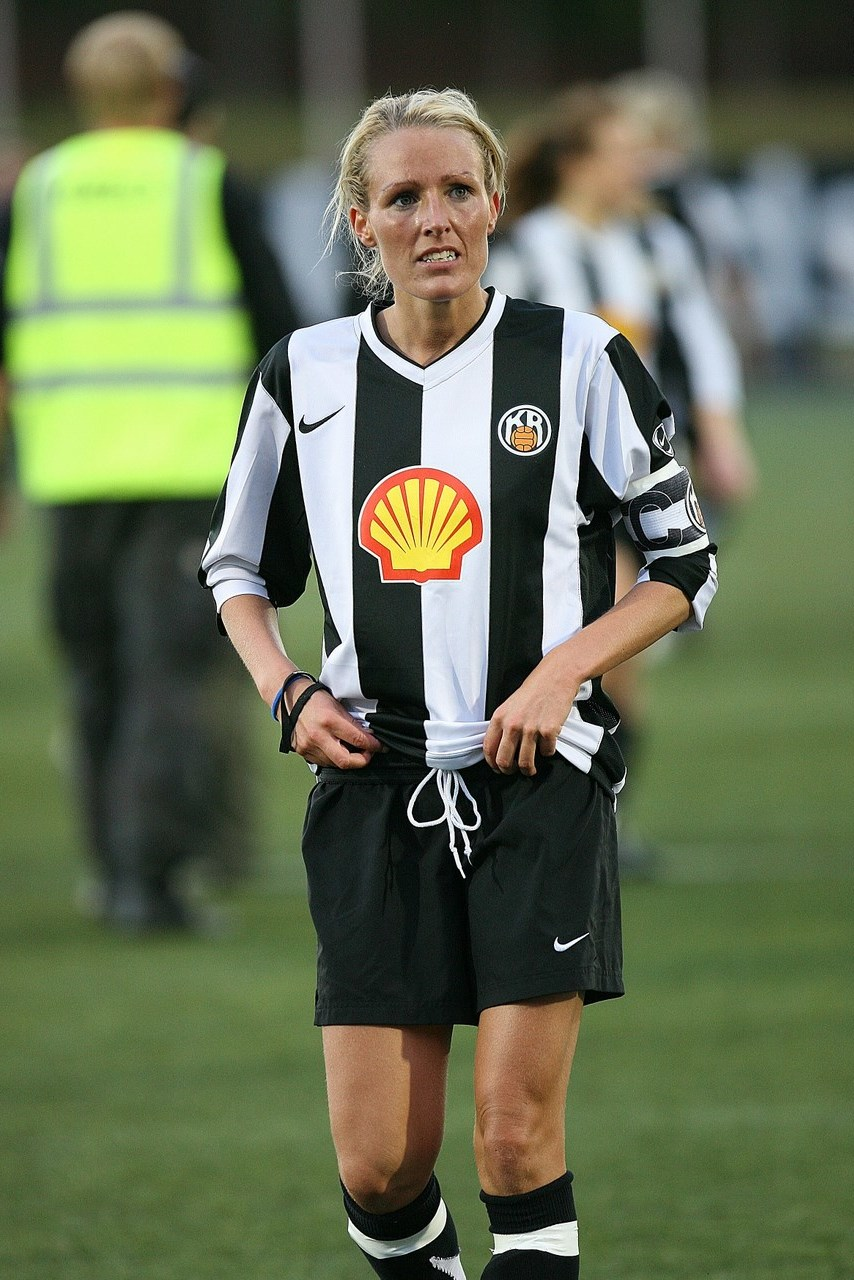
- Hrefna in 2008 with KR.

Personal information
- Full name: Hrefna Huld Jóhannesdóttir
- Date of birth: 25 October 1980 (age 46)
- Place of birth: Iceland
- Height: 1.68 m (5 ft 6 in)
- Position: Striker

College career
Years	Team	Apps	(Gls)
- Auburn Montgomery

Senior career*
Years	Team	Apps	(Gls)
1995–1997	KR	28	(14)
1998–1999	ÍBV	27	(11)
2000	Breiðablik	14	(9)
2001–2003	KR	42	(54)
2004	Medkila IL		
2005–2009	KR	59	(59)
2010	Þróttur	11	(15)
2011	Afturelding	4	(0)

International career^{‡}
1996–1997	Iceland U17	9	(2)
1997	Iceland U19	1	(2)
1997–2004	Iceland U21	32	(4)
2000–2005	Iceland	10	(3)
- * Club domestic league appearances and goals as of 26 February 2018 ‡ National team caps and goals as of 26 February 2018

Hrefna Huld Jóhannesdóttir (born 25 October 1980) is an Icelandic former footballer who played as a striker. She spent most of her career with KR and scored 179 goals in 220 Úrvalsdeild kvenna matches. In 2003, she won the Úrvalsdeild kvenna golden boot after scoring 21 goals in 14 matches. She played college football for Auburn Montgomery, and was named to the 2004 NAIA Women's Soccer All-American second team. From 2000 to 2005, she made ten appearances for the Iceland women's national football team. Hrefna retired from football in 2012 due to mental health issues.

== National team career ==
Hrefna played ten games for the Icelandic national football team from 2000 to 2005, scoring three goals.

== Honours ==
=== Club ===
- Úrvalsdeild kvenna (4): 1997, 2000, 2002, 2003
- Icelandic Women's Cup (3): 2002, 2007, 2008

=== Individual ===
- Úrvalsdeild kvenna top goalscorer: 2003
- NAIA Women's Soccer All-American second team: 2003
