= Hrönn =

Hrönn is a name. Notable people with the name include:

- Ólafía Hrönn Jónsdóttir (born 1962), Icelandic actress
- Þórdís Hrönn Sigfúsdóttir (born 1993), Icelandic footballer
