= Margrét Lára Viðarsdóttir =

Icelandic footballer (born 1986)

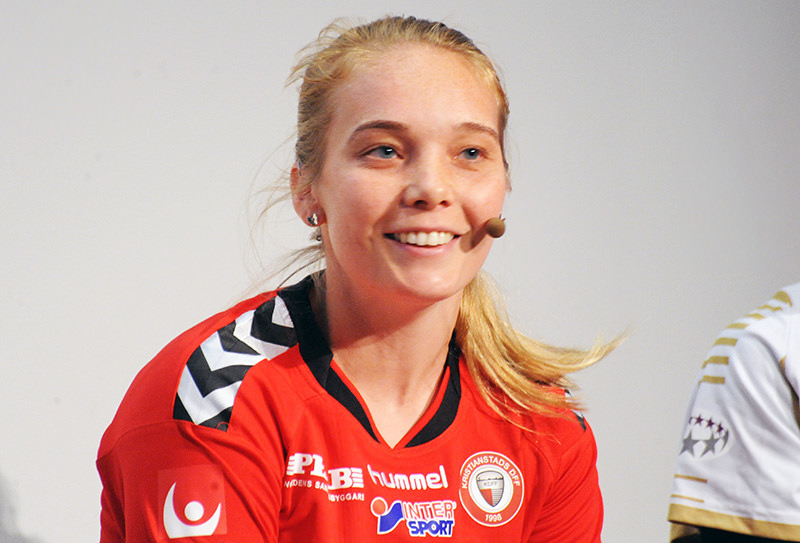
- Margrét Lára in 2015

Personal information
- Full name: Margrét Lára Viðarsdóttir
- Date of birth: 25 July 1986 (age 40)
- Place of birth: Vestmannaeyjar, Iceland
- Height: 5 ft 7 in (1.70 m)
- Position: Striker

Youth career
- Týr
- ÍBV

Senior career*
Years	Team	Apps	(Gls)
2000–2004	ÍBV	40	(48)
2005–2006	Valur	28	(57)
2006–2007	FCR Duisburg	0	(0)
2007–2008	Valur	34	(70)
2009	Linköpings FC	12	(2)
2009–2011	Kristianstads DFF	51	(27)
2012	Turbine Potsdam	7	(1)
2012–2015	Kristianstads DFF	50	(21)
2016–2019	Valur	41	(32)

International career
2001–2003	Iceland U-17	15	(6)
2001–2004	Iceland U-19	15	(13)
2003–2006	Iceland U-21	13	(11)
2003–2019	Iceland	124	(79)
- * Club domestic league appearances and goals

Margrét Lára Viðarsdóttir (born 25 July 1986) is an Icelandic former footballer who played as a striker. She is the all-time top goalscorer of the Iceland national team and competed for her country at the UEFA Women's Championships in 2009 and 2013. In a club career sometimes disrupted by injury, Margrét Lára represented ÍBV and Valur of the Icelandic Úrvalsdeild, Duisburg and Turbine Potsdam of the Frauen-Bundesliga, and Linköpings and Kristianstads DFF of the Damallsvenskan.

Margrét Lára is the elder sister of Elísa Viðarsdóttir, who also played for Iceland's national team.

== Early life ==
Margrét Lára was born in Vestmannaeyjar, Iceland to Viðar Elíasson and his wife Guðmunda Bjarnadóttir. Viðar had played football for ÍBV and later became chairman of the club. As well as Margrét Lára, both her brothers Bjarni Geir Viðarsson and Sindri Viðarsson played football for ÍBV, as did her only sister Elísa.

== Club career ==
Making her Úrvalsdeild kvenna debut as a 15-year-old, Margrét Lára developed into a prolific striker at ÍBV. In 2004, she switched to rivals Valur of Reykjavík and continued to score regularly. She won a league and cup double with Valur in 2006.

Margrét Lára's goalscoring record in Iceland meant that several leading clubs in Europe and America pursued her transfer. The Germans FCR 2001 Duisburg won the race for her signature and in October 2006 she scored twice in Duisburg's 3–2 win at holders Turbine Potsdam in the Frauen DFB Pokal. Margrét Lára failed to settle in Germany and returned to Valur in January 2007, citing homesickness.

A record-breaking season in 2007 saw Margrét Lára hit 38 goals in 16 league matches for Valur. She was also named Iceland's Sports Personality of the Year, ahead of the male footballer Eiður Guðjohnsen. As well as her scoring feats at domestic level, she thrived in the UEFA Women's Cup, finishing as overall top goalscorer in 2005–06, 2007–08 and 2008–09.

In the 2008 WPS International Draft, Margrét Lára was selected by the Los Angeles Sol but decided not to join the Women's Professional Soccer team. Instead she moved to Sweden and signed for Linköpings FC, remarking: "I will absolutely try to play in USA [sic] some time, but where I am career wise right now it feels better to play in Sweden."

At Linköpings Margrét Lára struggled to replicate her earlier form and started four of her 12 matches in the first half of the season, scoring twice. She wanted more playing time ahead of the 2009 European Championships so moved to Kristianstads DFF during the mid-season break. Although Kristianstads were a lower ranked team, she was happy to move in order to reunite with Elísabet Gunnarsdóttir – who had been her coach at Valur.

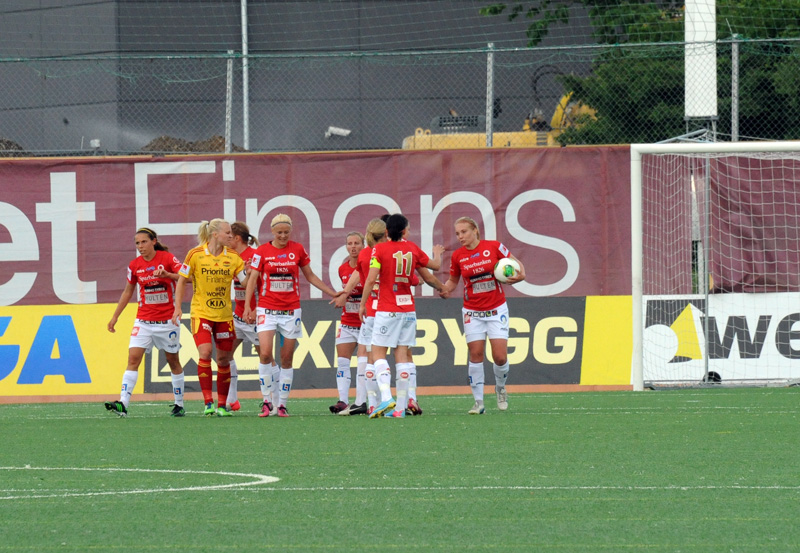
Margrét Lára (right) congratulated after scoring for Kristianstads at Tyresö FF in June 2013

She won the Damallsvenskan top scorer award in 2011, tied at 16 goals with Manon Melis of LdB FC Malmö. In October 2011 she signed for German champions Turbine Potsdam. Transferring outside the transfer window meant she was ineligible for league and Champions League matches until 1 January 2012.

A persistent hamstring injury marred Margrét Lára's second spell in German football. After scoring one league goal she was allowed to rejoin Kristianstads at the end of the season.

In September 2012 a Norwegian doctor diagnosed Margrét Lára's longstanding thigh injury as compartment syndrome. She immediately scheduled surgery to fix the issue which had inhibited her training for several seasons and caused her to operate at 70% of her true level.

Before the 2013 Damallsvenskan season, Kristianstads gave a trial to Margrét Lára's visiting sister Elísa in a pre-season friendly, but had no immediate plans to sign the younger Viðarsdóttir to a contract. Margrét Lára remained sidelined for several more weeks following her thigh operation. She scored 13 goals in 22 Damallsvenskan appearances in 2013, but announced her pregnancy in December which ruled her out of Kristianstads' 2014 campaign.

Following the birth of her first child, Margrét Lára returned to training with Kristianstads in December 2014. After playing in the 2015 Damallsvenskan season she made the decision to leave Kristianstads and returned to Iceland.

In November 2015, she completed her move back to Iceland by signing a two-year contract for a second spell with Valur. On 30 July 2019, she became the second player – after Olga Færseth – to score 200 goals in the Úrvalsdeild kvenna.

On 26 November 2019, Margrét Lára announced her retirement from football.

== International career ==
Margrét Lára made her first appearance for the Iceland senior national team on 14 June 2003, in a 2005 UEFA Women's Championship qualification match against Hungary at Laugardalsvöllur. She scored four minutes after entering play as a 66th-minute substitute in Iceland's 4–1 win.

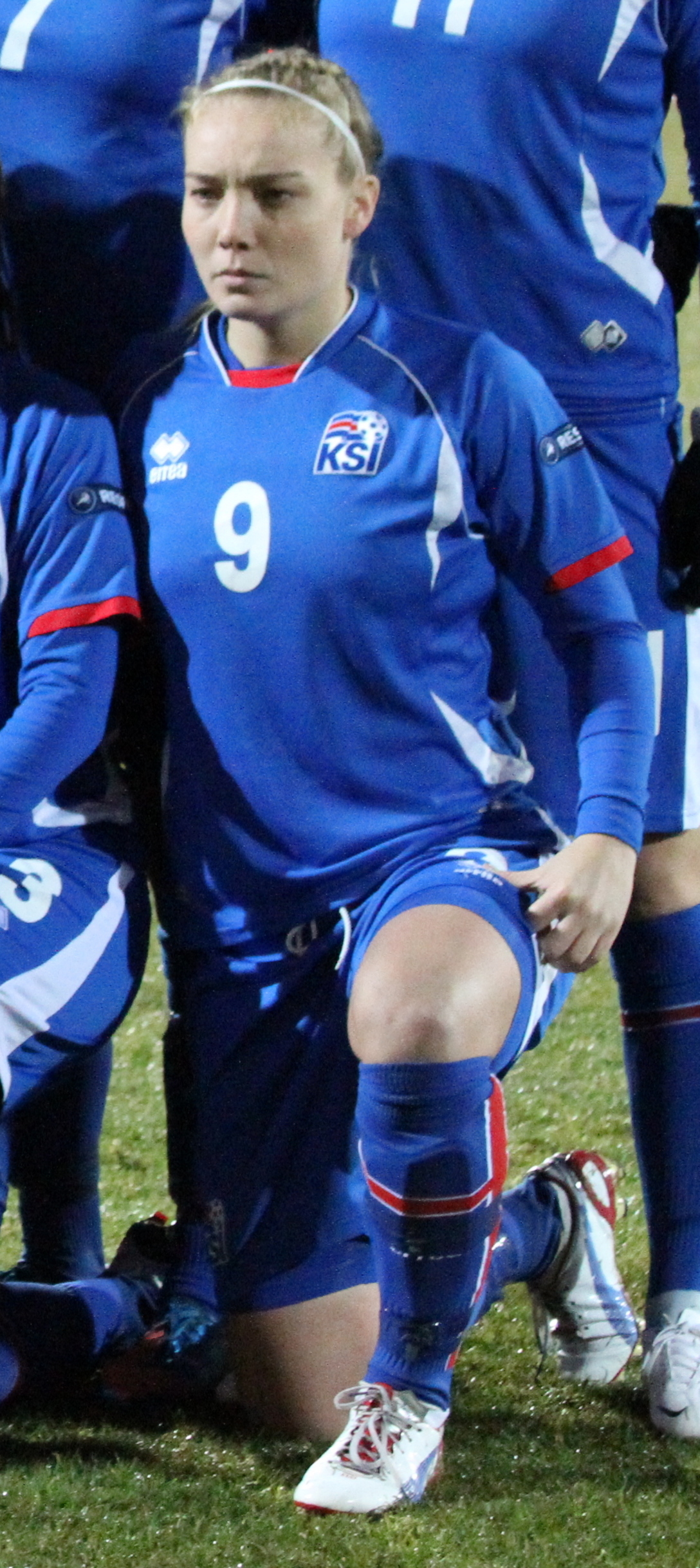
Lining up for Iceland in 2012

In qualifying for UEFA Women's Euro 2009, Margrét Lára was the competition's top scorer with 12 goals. She scored the only goal in a home win over France as Iceland reached their first major international tournament at any level. At the final tournament in Finland, she played in all three group games as Iceland made a first round exit.

Four years later, national team coach Siggi Eyjólfsson selected Margrét Lára in the Iceland squad for UEFA Women's Euro 2013. She had contributed 11 goals during qualifying, including goals in both legs of the play-off win over Ukraine.

In Iceland's opening match in Kalmar, Margrét Lára struck a late penalty to secure a 1–1 draw with Norway which gave Iceland their first ever point in a European Championship finals. It was her 70th goal in her 89th cap. The team qualified for the quarter-finals, where they were beaten 4–0 by hosts Sweden.

With Margrét Lára on maternity leave, incoming national coach Freyr Alexandersson appointed Sara Björk Gunnarsdóttir as the new team captain in 2014. After the birth of her first child Margrét Lára was swiftly recalled to Iceland's squad for the 2015 Algarve Cup.

Her last international game came on 8 October 2019 where she scored one goal in Iceland's 6–0 victory against Latvia.

== Career statistics ==
As of match played on 8 October 2019

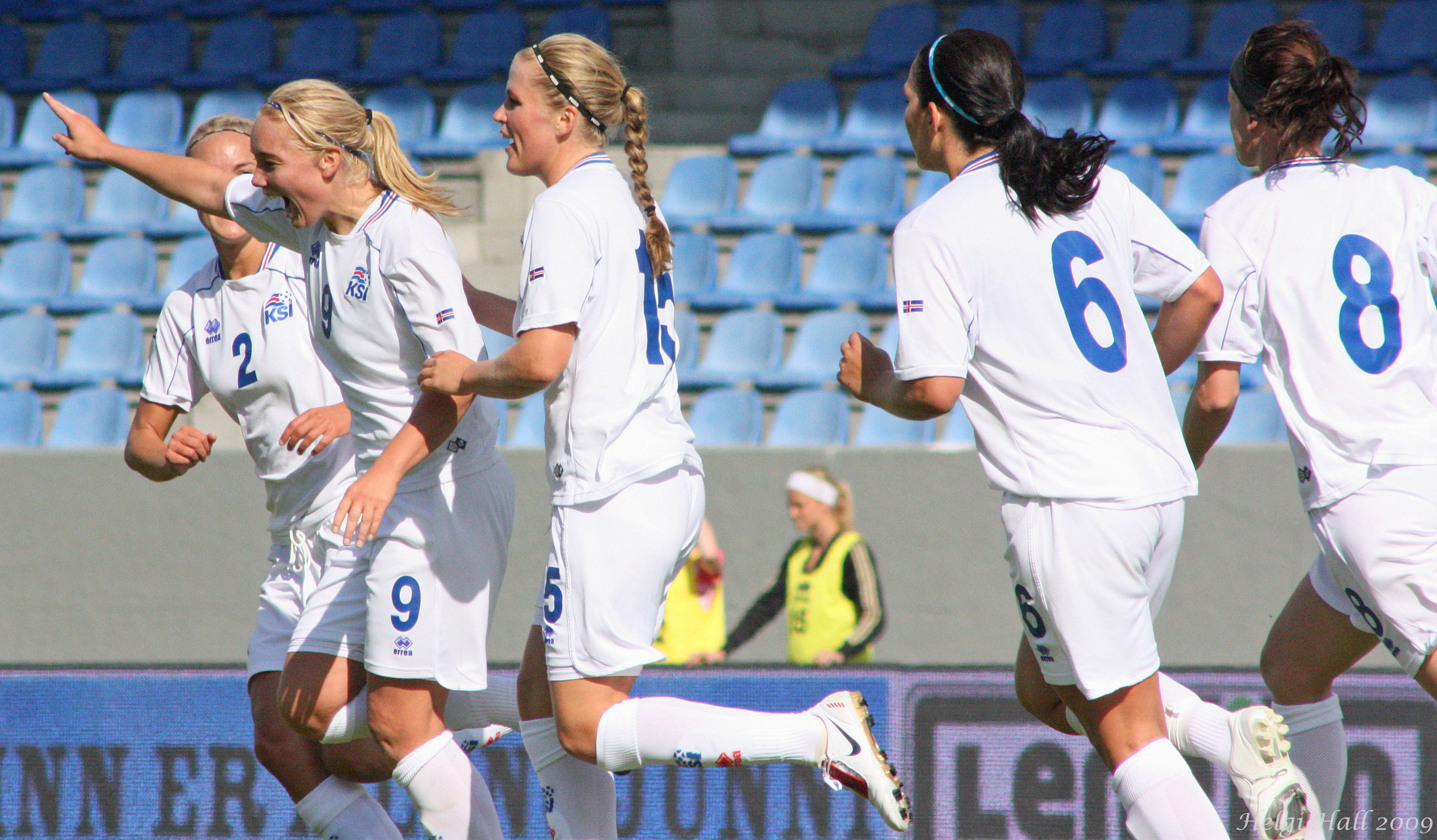
Margrét Lára (9) after scoring for Iceland in 2009

Appearances and goals by national team and year
National team	Year	Apps	Goals
Iceland	2003	5	5
Iceland	2004	9	6
Iceland	2005	4	2
Iceland	2006	8	8
Iceland	2007	9	8
Iceland	2008	11	14
Iceland	2009	14	8
Iceland	2010	8	4
Iceland	2011	9	8
Iceland	2012	9	6
Iceland	2013	8	2
Iceland	2014	0	0
Iceland	2015	8	4
Iceland	2016	10	2
Iceland	2017	5	0
Iceland	2018	0	0
Iceland	2019	7	2
Total		124	79

Scores and results list Iceland's goal tally first, score column indicates score after each Margrét Lára goal.

List of international goals scored by Margrét Lára Viðarsdóttir
No.	Date	Venue	Opponent	Score	Result	Competition
1	14 June 2003	Reykjavík, Iceland	Hungary	4–1	4–1	UEFA Euro 2005 qualification
2	9 September 2003	Reykjavík, Iceland	Poland	4–0	10–0	UEFA Euro 2005 qualification
3	9 September 2003	Reykjavík, Iceland	Poland	5–0	10–0	UEFA Euro 2005 qualification
4	9 September 2003	Reykjavík, Iceland	Poland	7–0	10–0	UEFA Euro 2005 qualification
5	27 September 2003	Bydgoszcz, Poland	Poland	2–1	3–2	UEFA Euro 2005 qualification
6	13 March 2004	Reykjavík, Iceland	Scotland	1–1	5–1	Friendly
7	13 March 2004	Reykjavík, Iceland	Scotland	3–1	5–1	Friendly
8	13 March 2004	Reykjavík, Iceland	Scotland	4–1	5–1	Friendly
9	29 May 2004	Székesfehérvár, Hungary	Hungary	1–0	5–0	UEFA Euro 2005 qualification
10	29 May 2004	Székesfehérvár, Hungary	Hungary	5–0	5–0	UEFA Euro 2005 qualification
11	10 November 2004	Reykjavík, Iceland	Norway	2–6	2–7	UEFA Euro 2005 qualification
12	21 August 2005	Reykjavík, Iceland	Belarus	2–0	3–0	2007 FIFA World Cup qualification
13	28 August 2005	Karlskoga, Sweden	Sweden	2–2	2–2	2007 FIFA World Cup qualification
14	18 June 2006	Reykjavík, Iceland	Portugal	1–0	3–0	2007 FIFA World Cup qualification
15	18 June 2006	Reykjavík, Iceland	Portugal	3–0	3–0	2007 FIFA World Cup qualification
16	19 August 2006	Reykjavík, Iceland	Czech Republic	2–1	2–4	2007 FIFA World Cup qualification
17	28 September 2006	Lisbon, Portugal	Portugal	2–0	6–0	2007 FIFA World Cup qualification
18	28 September 2006	Lisbon, Portugal	Portugal	4–0	6–0	2007 FIFA World Cup qualification
19	28 September 2006	Lisbon, Portugal	Portugal	5–0	6–0	2007 FIFA World Cup qualification
20	28 September 2006	Lisbon, Portugal	Portugal	6–0	6–0	2007 FIFA World Cup qualification
21	8 October 2006	Richmond, United States	United States	1–1	1–2	Friendly
22	7 March 2007	Lagos, Portugal	Italy	1–1	1–2	2007 Algarve Cup
23	12 March 2007	Lagos, Portugal	Portugal	5–1	5–1	2007 Algarve Cup
24	14 March 2007	Albufeira, Portugal	China	3–0	4–1	2007 Algarve Cup
25	14 March 2007	Albufeira, Portugal	China	4–0	4–1	2007 Algarve Cup
26	31 May 2007	Kaisariani, Greece	Greece	1–0	3–0	UEFA Euro 2009 qualification
27	16 June 2007	Reykjavík, Iceland	France	1–0	1–0	UEFA Euro 2009 qualification
28	21 June 2007	Reykjavík, Iceland	Greece	4–0	5–0	UEFA Euro 2009 qualification
29	26 August 2007	Dravograd, Slovenia	Slovenia	1–0	1–2	UEFA Euro 2009 qualification
30	5 March 2008	Lagos, Portugal	Poland	2–0	2–0	2008 Algarve Cup
31	7 March 2008	Lagos, Portugal	Republic of Ireland	2–0	4–0	2008 Algarve Cup
32	7 March 2008	Lagos, Portugal	Republic of Ireland	4–0	4–0	2008 Algarve Cup
33	10 March 2008	Vila Real de Santo António, Portugal	Portugal	1–0	3–0	2008 Algarve Cup
34	10 March 2008	Vila Real de Santo António, Portugal	Portugal	2–0	3–0	2008 Algarve Cup
35	12 March 2008	Loulé, Portugal	Finland	1–0	3–0	2008 Algarve Cup
36	28 May 2008	Kragujevac, Serbia	Serbia	2–0	4–0	UEFA Euro 2009 qualification
37	28 May 2008	Kragujevac, Serbia	Serbia	4–0	4–0	UEFA Euro 2009 qualification
38	21 June 2008	Reykjavík, Iceland	Slovenia	1–0	5–0	UEFA Euro 2009 qualification
39	21 June 2008	Reykjavík, Iceland	Slovenia	2–0	5–0	UEFA Euro 2009 qualification
40	21 June 2008	Reykjavík, Iceland	Slovenia	3–0	5–0	UEFA Euro 2009 qualification
41	26 June 2008	Reykjavík, Iceland	Greece	3–0	7–0	UEFA Euro 2009 qualification
42	26 June 2008	Reykjavík, Iceland	Greece	7–0	7–0	UEFA Euro 2009 qualification
43	30 October 2008	Reykjavík, Iceland	Republic of Ireland	2–0	3–0	UEFA Euro 2009 qualification
44	16 July 2009	Colchester, England	England	2–0	2–0	Friendly
45	15 August 2009	Reykjavík, Iceland	Serbia	1–0	5–0	2011 FIFA World Cup qualification
46	15 August 2009	Reykjavík, Iceland	Serbia	2–0	5–0	2011 FIFA World Cup qualification
47	15 August 2009	Reykjavík, Iceland	Serbia	3–0	5–0	2011 FIFA World Cup qualification
48	15 August 2009	Reykjavík, Iceland	Serbia	5–0	5–0	2011 FIFA World Cup qualification
49	17 September 2009	Reykjavík, Iceland	Estonia	1–0	12–0	2011 FIFA World Cup qualification
50	17 September 2009	Reykjavík, Iceland	Estonia	3–0	12–0	2011 FIFA World Cup qualification
51	17 September 2009	Reykjavík, Iceland	Estonia	7–0	12–0	2011 FIFA World Cup qualification
52	1 March 2010	Silves, Portugal	Norway	1–1	2–3	2010 Algarve Cup
53	31 March 2010	Vrbovec, Croatia	Croatia	2–0	3–0	2011 FIFA World Cup qualification
54	25 August 2010	Rakvere, Estonia	Estonia	1–0	5–0	2011 FIFA World Cup qualification
55	25 August 2010	Rakvere, Estonia	Estonia	2–0	5–0	2011 FIFA World Cup qualification
56	2 March 2011	Loulé, Portugal	Sweden	1–1	2–1	2011 Algarve Cup
57	4 March 2011	Albufeira, Portugal	China	1–1	2–1	2011 Algarve Cup
58	4 March 2011	Albufeira, Portugal	China	2–1	2–1	2011 Algarve Cup
59	19 May 2011	Reykjavík, Iceland	Bulgaria	1–0	6–0	UEFA Euro 2013 qualification
60	19 May 2011	Reykjavík, Iceland	Bulgaria	3–0	6–0	UEFA Euro 2013 qualification
61	19 May 2011	Reykjavík, Iceland	Bulgaria	5–0	6–0	UEFA Euro 2013 qualification
62	19 May 2011	Reykjavík, Iceland	Bulgaria	6–0	6–0	UEFA Euro 2013 qualification
63	17 September 2011	Reykjavík, Iceland	Norway	2–0	3–1	UEFA Euro 2013 qualification
64	16 June 2012	Reykjavík, Iceland	Hungary	1–0	3–0	UEFA Euro 2013 qualification
65	21 June 2012	Lovech, Bulgaria	Bulgaria	3–0	10–0	UEFA Euro 2013 qualification
66	21 June 2012	Lovech, Bulgaria	Bulgaria	4–0	10–0	UEFA Euro 2013 qualification
67	19 September 2012	Oslo, Norway	Norway	1–2	1–2	UEFA Euro 2013 qualification
68	20 October 2012	Sevastopol, Ukraine	Ukraine	3–2	3–2	UEFA Euro 2013 qualification
69	25 October 2012	Reykjavík, Iceland	Ukraine	1–0	3–2	UEFA Euro 2013 qualification
70	11 July 2013	Kalmar, Sweden	Norway	1–1	1–1	UEFA Euro 2013
71	31 October 2013	Belgrade, Serbia	Serbia	1–0	2–1	2015 FIFA World Cup qualification
72	17 September 2015	Reykjavík, Iceland	Slovakia	3–0	4–0	Friendly
73	22 October 2015	Skopje, FYR Macedonia	North Macedonia	1–0	4–0	UEFA Euro 2017 qualification
73	22 October 2015	Skopje, FYR Macedonia	North Macedonia	4–0	4–0	UEFA Euro 2017 qualification
75	26 October 2015	Lendava, Slovenia	Slovakia	4–0	6–0	UEFA Euro 2017 qualification
76	12 April 2016	Minsk, Belarus	Belarus	1–0	5–0	UEFA Euro 2017 qualification
77	3 June 2016	Falkirk, Scotland	Scotland	4–0	4–0	UEFA Euro 2017 qualification
78	6 March 2019	Parchal, Portugal	Portugal	3–1	4–1	2019 Algarve Cup
79	8 October 2019	Liepāja, Latvia	Latvia	6–0	6–0	UEFA Euro 2021 qualification

== Honours ==
Valur

- Úrvalsdeild kvenna: 2006, 2007, 2008, 2019
- Icelandic Women's Cup: 2006

Individual

- Úrvalsdeild kvenna top scorer: 2004, 2005, 2006, 2007, 2008
- Damallsvenskan top scorer: 2011
- UEFA Women's Champions League top scorer: 2006, 2008, 2009
