= Lára Pedersen =

Icelandic footballer (born 1994)

Personal information
- Full name: Lára Kristín Pedersen
- Date of birth: 23 May 1994 (age 32)
- Height: 5 ft 8 in (1.73 m)
- Position: Midfielder

College career
Years	Team	Apps	(Gls)
2013	St. John's Red Storm	20	(0)

Senior career*
Years	Team	Apps	(Gls)
2009–2013	Afturelding	58	(8)
2014–2018	Stjarnan	77	(5)
2019	Þór/KA	18	(1)
2020	KR	15	(1)
2021	Napoli	6	(0)
2021–2023	Valur	49	(3)
2024	Fortuna Sittard	13	(0)
2024–2025	Club Brugge	1	(1)

International career^{‡}
2009–2010	Iceland U16	9	(0)
2009–2011	Iceland U17	6	(0)
2011–2013	Iceland U19	15	(1)
2012–2015	Iceland U23	2	(0)
2015–2023	Iceland	3	(0)
- * Club domestic league appearances and goals as of 5 September 2025 ‡ National team caps and goals as of 5 September 2025

Lára Kristín Pedersen (born 23 May 1994) is an Icelandic former footballer who played as a midfielder. She won the Icelandic championship five times during her career.

== Club career ==
Lára Kristín grew up in Mosfellsbær and began her football career with Afturelding. She spent five largely successful seasons with Stjarnan from 2014 to 2018, but refused a new contract and decided to move on after the club finished third in 2018. After spending a season with Þór/KA, she signed a two-year contract with KR in October 2019.

In February 2021, Lára Kristín signed for Napoli, as a replacement for Jacynta Galabadaarachchi who had transferred to Celtic.

== International career ==
Lára Kristín won her first senior cap for the Iceland women's national football team on 4 March 2015, in a 2–0 defeat by Switzerland at the 2015 Algarve Cup. She was named as one of eight players on standby for the Iceland squad at UEFA Women's Euro 2017.

== Personal life ==
In February 2019, Lára Kristín gave a radio interview which revealed her long-term struggle with a food addiction.
