= María Björg Ágústsdóttir =

Icelandic footballer (born 1982)

Personal information
- Date of birth: 1 December 1982 (age 43)
- Place of birth: Iceland
- Position: Goalkeeper

College career
Years	Team	Apps	(Gls)
2005	Harvard Crimson		

Senior career*
Years	Team	Apps	(Gls)
1997–2003	Stjarnan		
2004–2008	KR		
2009–2010	Valur	36	(0)
2011	KIF Örebro	4	(0)
2013	KR	3	(0)
2021	Stjarnan	0	(0)

International career
- Iceland
- * Club domestic league appearances and goals

María Björg Ágústsdóttir (born 1 December 1982) is an Icelandic former footballer who played as a goalkeeper.

== Early life ==
María attended Harvard University in the United States.

== Club career ==
Before the 2004 season, María signed for Icelandic side KR, helping the club win the 2008 Icelandic Women's Football League Cup. Before the 2009 season, she signed for Icelandic side Valur, where she was regarded as one of the club's most important players. In 2011, she signed for Swedish side KIF Örebro, where she suffered a knee injury. In 2012, she retired from professional football. She previously took a temporary break from professional football from 2006 to 2007.

== International career ==
María played for the Iceland women's national football team and helped the team achieve qualification to UEFA Women's Euro 2009.

== Style of play ==
María is known for her ball distribution ability.

== Personal life ==
María has been nicknamed "Maja".
