= Ásgerður Baldursdóttir =

Icelandic footballer

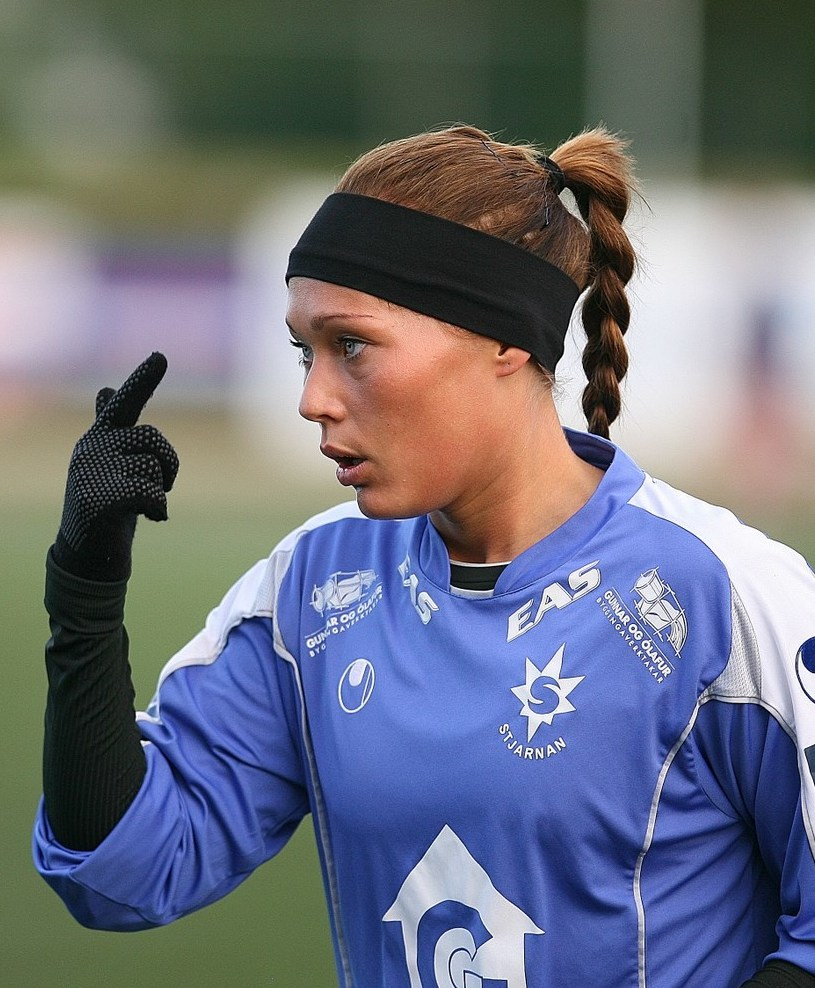
- Ásgerður in 2008.

Personal information
- Full name: Ásgerður Stefanía Baldursdóttir
- Date of birth: 5 January 1987 (age 39)
- Position: Midfielder

Team information
- Current team: Valur
- Number: 27

Senior career*
Years	Team	Apps	(Gls)
2004	Breiðablik UBK	1	(0)
2005–2018	Stjarnan	218	(28)
2015	→ Kristianstads DFF (loan)	5	(0)
2019–2022	Valur	32	(0)

International career^{‡}
2014–2016	Iceland	10	(0)
- * Club domestic league appearances and goals as of 20 April 2020 ‡ National team caps and goals as of 20 April 2020

Ásgerður Stefanía "Adda" Baldursdóttir (born 5 January 1987) is an Icelandic footballer who plays for Valur of the Úrvalsdeild kvenna. She also plays for the Iceland women's national team.

== Club career ==
In 2015 she was loaned to Kristianstads DFF and played five Damallsvenskan matches for the Swedish club, before returning for the start of the Iceland season in May. She agreed to join Kristianstads permanently in January 2016, but then changed her mind and decided to stay with Stjarnan.

Ásgerður missed the 2017 Úrvalsdeild season due to pregnancy.

In October 2022, Ásgerður decided to retire from playing as it was announced that she was hired as a coach for the Valur team following their cup championship in the prior season.

== International career ==
Ásgerður was called into the Iceland national team for the first time in September 2013. Incoming national coach Freyr Alexandersson called up six Stjarnan players following the club's successful season. She made her debut in a 2–1 defeat to Germany at the Algarve Cup in March 2014.

== Personal life ==
In September 2014 Ásgerður was in a relationship with footballer Almarr Ormarsson.
