= Dóra María Lárusdóttir =

Icelandic footballer (born 1985)

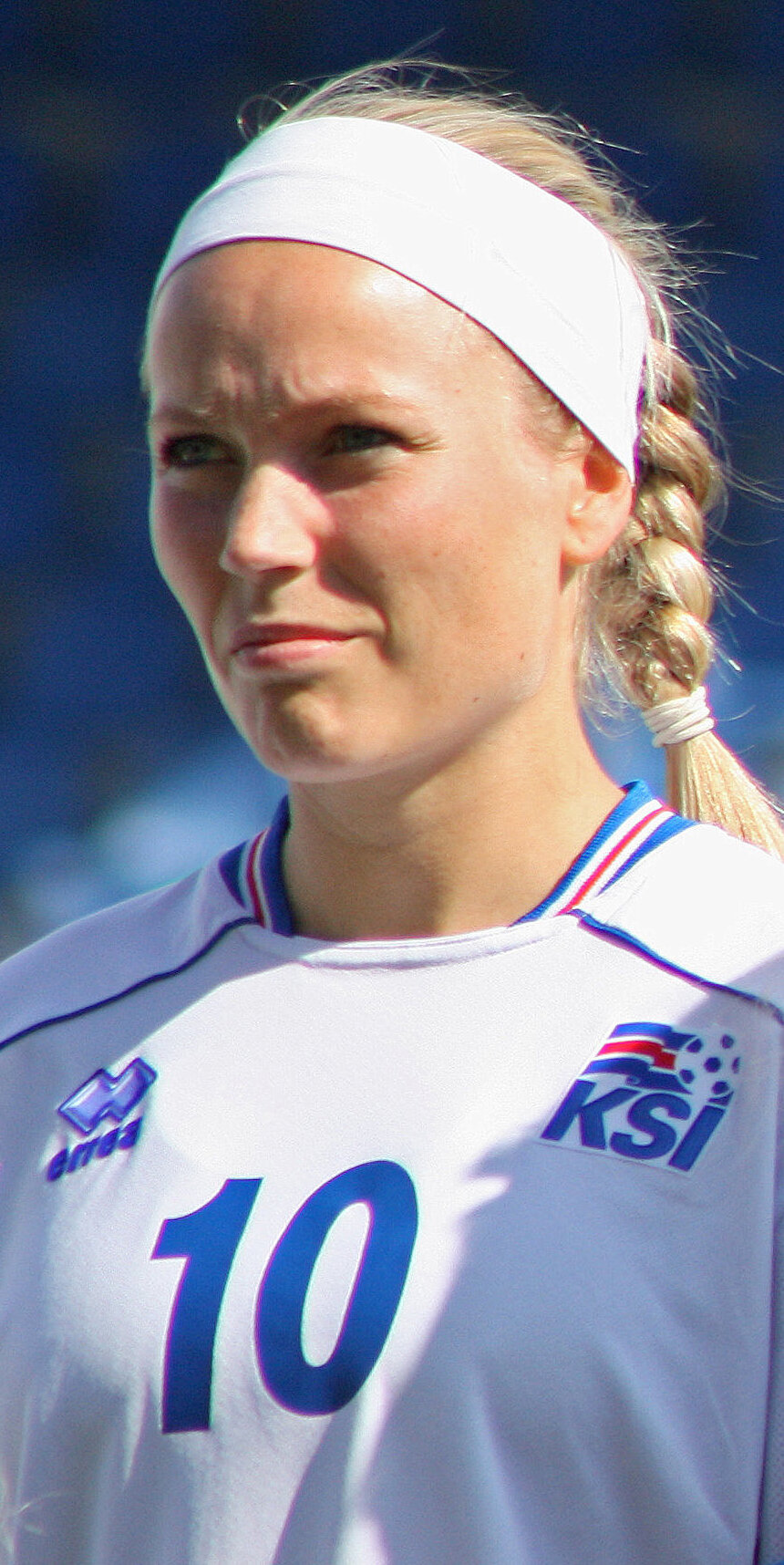
- Dóra María Lárusdóttir lined up for Iceland in 2009

Personal information
- Full name: Dóra María Lárusdóttir
- Date of birth: 24 July 1985 (age 41)
- Place of birth: Iceland
- Height: 1.69 m (5 ft 7 in)
- Positions: Right back; right wing

Team information
- Current team: Valur
- Number: 22

College career
| Years | Team | Apps | (Gls) |
| 2005–2008 | Rhode Island Rams | | |

Senior career*
| Years | Team | Apps | (Gls) |
| 2001–2010 | Valur | 135 | (70) |
| 2011 | Djurgårdens IF | 22 | (2) |
| 2012 | Vitória | | |
| 2012–2021 | Valur | 134 | (24) |

International career^{‡}
| 2001–2002 | Iceland U-17 | 8 | (3) |
| 2001–2004 | Iceland U-19 | 17 | (6) |
| 2002–2006 | Iceland U-21 | 21 | (2) |
| 2003–2017 | Iceland | 114 | (18) |
- * Club domestic league appearances and goals as of 12 February 2017 ‡ National team caps and goals as of 19 March 2022

Dóra María Lárusdóttir (born 24 July 1985) is an Icelandic former football player who predominantly played as a winger for Icelandic club Valur. Having played for Valur for a decade and been voted national Player of the Year in 2008 and 2010, Dóra María was for many years one of Iceland's leading female footballers. During her career, she won the Icelandic championship eight times and the Icelandic Cup five times. From 2003 to 2017, Dóra María was part of the Iceland women's national team and she participated at the 2009 and 2013 editions of the UEFA Women's Championship.

== Club career ==
Dóra María spent the 2011 season playing for Djurgårdens IF in Sweden's Damallsvenskan. She scored twice in her 22 league appearances. In January 2012 Dóra María signed for Vitória, of Brazil, where she joined compatriot Þórunn Helga Jónsdóttir.

In March 2022, she announced her retirement from football.

== International career ==
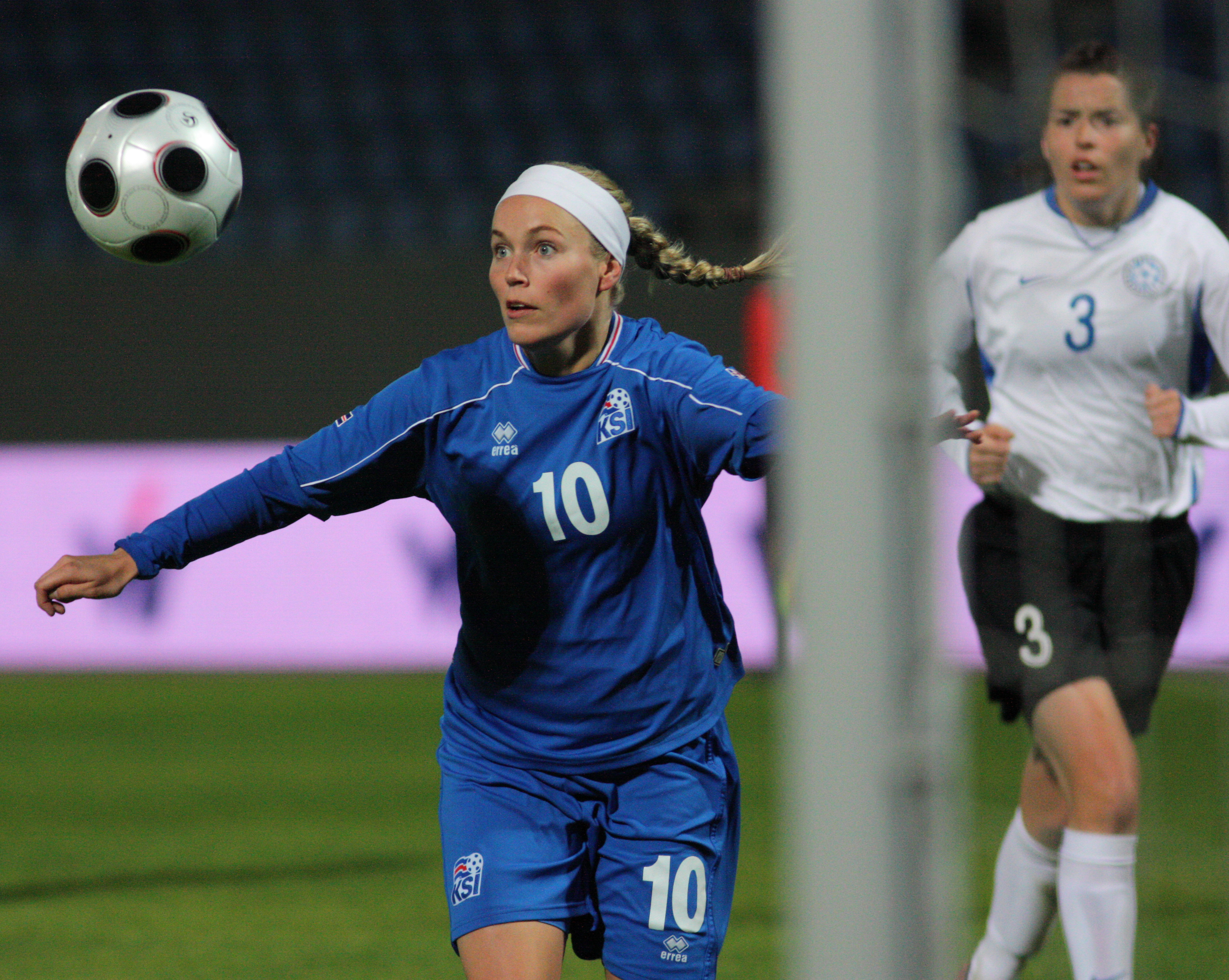
Dóra María (10) playing against Estonia in September 2009

In September 2003 Dóra María made her senior debut for the Iceland national team, in a 10–0 rout of Poland at Laugardalsvöllur during the 2005 UEFA Women's Championship qualification series. She scored Iceland's final goal of the match after entering play as a 71st-minute substitute.

She became a national team regular over the following years, usually playing on the right wing. In qualifying for UEFA Women's Euro 2009, Dóra María scored twice in the 3–0 play-off second leg win over Ireland as Iceland reached their first major international tournament at any level. At the final tournament in Finland, she played in all three group games as Iceland made a first round exit.

National team coach Siggi Eyjólfsson selected Dóra María in the Iceland squad for UEFA Women's Euro 2013 in Sweden.

== Honours ==
=== Club ===
Valur

- Úrvalsdeild kvenna: 2004, 2006, 2007, 2008, 2009, 2010
- Icelandic Women's Football Cup: 2001, 2003, 2006, 2009, 2010

=== Individual ===
- Úrvalsdeild kvenna Player of the Year: 2008, 2010

== International goals ==
| No. | Date | Venue | Opponent | Score | Result | Competition |
|---|---|---|---|---|---|---|
| 1. | 13 September 2003 | Reykjavík, Iceland | Poland | 10–0 | 10–0 | UEFA Women's Euro 2005 qualifying |
| 2. | 21 August 2005 | Reykjavík, Iceland | Belarus | 1–0 | 3–0 | 2007 FIFA Women's World Cup qualification |
| 3. | 21 August 2005 | Reykjavík, Iceland | Belarus | 3–0 | 3–0 | 2007 FIFA Women's World Cup qualification |
| 4. | 14 March 2007 | Albufeira, Portugal | China | 1–0 | 4–1 | 2007 Algarve Cup |
| 5. | 21 July 2007 | Reykjavík, Iceland | Serbia | 2–0 | 5–0 | UEFA Women's Euro 2009 qualifying |
| 6. | 30 October 2008 | Reykjavík, Iceland | Republic of Ireland | 1–0 | 3–0 | UEFA Women's Euro 2009 qualifying |
| 7. | 30 October 2008 | Reykjavík, Iceland | Republic of Ireland | 3–0 | 3–0 | UEFA Women's Euro 2009 qualifying |
| 8. | 17 September 2009 | Reykjavík, Iceland | Estonia | 2–0 | 12–0 | 2011 FIFA Women's World Cup qualification |
| 9. | 3 March 2010 | Faro, Portugal | Portugal | 3–0 | 3–0 | 2010 Algarve Cup |
| 10. | 7 March 2011 | Lagos, Portugal | Denmark | 1–0 | 1–0 | 2011 Algarve Cup |
| 11. | 22 October 2011 | Pápa, Hungary | Hungary | 1–0 | 1–0 | UEFA Women's Euro 2013 qualifying |
| 12. | 2 March 2012 | Ferreiras, Portugal | Sweden | 1–2 | 1–4 | 2012 Algarve Cup |
| 13. | 21 June 2012 | Lovech, Bulgaria | Bulgaria | 9–0 | 10–0 | UEFA Women's Euro 2013 qualifying |
| 14. | 10 April 2014 | Ta'Qali, Malta | Malta | 2–0 | 8–0 | 2015 FIFA Women's World Cup qualification |
| 15. | 15 June 2014 | Vejle, Denmark | Denmark | 1–0 | 1–1 | 2015 FIFA Women's World Cup qualification |
| 16. | 19 June 2014 | Reykjavík, Iceland | Malta | 3–0 | 5–0 | 2015 FIFA Women's World Cup qualification |
