= Ragna Lóa Stefánsdóttir =

Icelandic footballer (born 1966)

Personal information
- Date of birth: 10 September 1966 (age 60)
- Place of birth: Iceland
- Position: Centre back

Senior career*
Years	Team	Apps	(Gls)
1990	ÍA	10	(3)
1992–1995	Stjarnan	45	(16)
1996	Valur	13	(1)
1997–1998	KR	18	(1)
2003	KR	1	(0)
Total		81	(21)

International career^{‡}
1985–1997	Iceland	35	(2)

Managerial career
- 1997: KR (player-manager)
- 2013–2014: Fylkir
- 2019–present: KR (assistant)
- 2019: KR (caretaker)
- * Club domestic league appearances and goals as of 10:46, 31 March 2012 (UTC) ‡ National team caps and goals as of 16:35, 27 October 2011 (UTC)

Ragna Lóa Stefánsdóttir (born 10 September 1966) is an Icelandic former football player who played for Úrvalsdeild kvenna clubs ÍA, Stjarnan, Valur and KR. Ragna Lóa won 35 caps and scored two goals for the Iceland women's national football team.

== International career ==
Ragna Lóa made her debut for Iceland in an August 1985 friendly match against Switzerland. She scored in her second match, another friendly against the same opposition two days later. In a 1993 UEFA Women's Championship qualification match against England in July 1992, Ragna Lóa scored her second international goal.

On 2 September 1997, Ragna Lóa broke her leg in a 1999 FIFA Women's World Cup qualification match against Ukraine. The injury was severe and required surgery. After the surgery she developed a life-threatening fat embolism syndrome which caused her lungs to shut down. She was put to a medically induced coma and kept on a ventilator for almost five days. She never fully recovered from the injury and retired from playing football following the 1998 season, except one match played in 2003.

== Managerial career ==
Ragna Lóa was named the 1997 Icelandic women's football manager of the year after she guided KR to the Icelandic championship. The day that KR secured the title, Ragna Lóa was still in a medically induced coma following her broken leg in Iceland's game against Ukraine. The first thing she saw when she woke up was the Icelandic championship trophy by her bedside.

She was the manager of Fylkir women's team from 2013 to 2014.

In November 2018, Ragna Lóa was hired as an assistant coach to Bojana Kristín Besic at KR. In July 2019, she took over as caretaker manager of the team after Besic resigned and guided the team to two victories before being replaced with Jóhannes Karl Sigursteinsson.

== Personal life ==
Ragna Lóa was married to fellow Icelander Hermann Hreiðarsson, himself a football player. She has four children, including footballers Ída Marín Hermannsdóttir and Thelma Lóa Hermannsdóttir.
