= 2021 Úrvalsdeild kvenna (football) =

Úrvalsdeild kvenna
- Season: 2021
- Dates: 4 May 2021 – 12 September 2021
- Matches: 90
- Goals: 301 (3.34 per match)
- All statistics correct as of 30 October 2020.

The 2021 Úrvalsdeild kvenna, known as Pepsi Max deild kvenna for sponsorship reasons, was the 50th season of the women's association football highest division league in Iceland. Breiðablik were the defending champions after claiming the 2020 championship.

== Teams ==
The 2021 Úrvalsdeild kvenna was contested by 10 teams, eight of which played in the division the previous season and two promoted from the 2020 1. deild kvenna. The bottom two teams from the previous season, FH and KR were relegated to the 1. deild kvenna and were replaced by Keflavík and Tindastóll, the winner and runners-up of the 2020 1. deild kvenna respectively.

| Team | Location | Stadium | Capacity |
|---|---|---|---|
| Breiðablik | Kópavogur | Kópavogsvöllur | 5,501 |
| Keflavík | Keflavík | Keflavíkurvöllur | 4,000 |
| Fylkir | Reykjavík | Floridana Völlurinn | 1,800 |
| ÍBV | Vestmannaeyjar | Hásteinsvöllur | 3,034 |
| Selfoss | Selfoss | Selfossvöllur | 950 |
| Stjarnan | Garðabær | Samsung völlurinn | 2,300 |
| Tindastóll | Sauðárkrókur | Sauðárkróksvöllur | 1,300 |
| Þróttur | Reykjavík | Valbjarnarvöllur | 5,478 |
| Valur | Reykjavík | Valsvöllur | 2,465 |
| Þór/KA | Akureyri | Þórsvöllur | 1,550 |

Source: Scoresway

== League table ==
| Pos | Team | Pld | W | D | L | GF | GA | GD | Pts | PPG | Qualification or relegation |
|---|---|---|---|---|---|---|---|---|---|---|---|
| 1 | Valur (C) | 18 | 14 | 3 | 1 | 52 | 17 | +35 | 45 | 2.50 | Champions and qualified to UEFA Women's Champions league First Round (Champions Path) |
| 2 | Breiðablik | 18 | 11 | 3 | 4 | 59 | 27 | +32 | 36 | 2.00 | Qualified to UEFA Women's Champions league First Round (League Path) |
| 3 | Þróttur | 18 | 8 | 5 | 5 | 36 | 34 | +2 | 29 | 1.61 | |
| 4 | Stjarnan | 18 | 8 | 3 | 7 | 23 | 27 | −4 | 27 | 1.50 | |
| 5 | Selfoss | 18 | 7 | 4 | 7 | 31 | 32 | −1 | 25 | 1.39 | |
| 6 | Þór/KA | 18 | 5 | 7 | 6 | 18 | 23 | −5 | 22 | 1.22 | |
| 7 | ÍBV | 18 | 7 | 1 | 10 | 33 | 40 | −7 | 22 | 1.22 | |
| 8 | Keflavík | 18 | 4 | 6 | 8 | 16 | 26 | −10 | 18 | 1.00 | |
| 9 | Tindastóll (R) | 18 | 4 | 2 | 12 | 15 | 32 | −17 | 14 | 0.78 | Relegation to 1. deild kvenna |
| 10 | Fylkir (R) | 18 | 3 | 4 | 11 | 18 | 43 | −25 | 13 | 0.72 | Relegation to 1. deild kvenna |

Source: KSÍ
Rules for classification: 1) Points; 2) Goal difference; 3) Number of goals scored; 4) Head-to-head points; 5) Head-to-head goal difference; 6) Head-to-head away goals scored
(C) Champions; (R) Relegated
