= Ída Marín Hermannsdóttir =

Icelandic footballer

Personal information
- Date of birth: 13 July 2002 (age 24)
- Place of birth: England
- Positions: Midfielder; forward

Team information
- Current team: Hammarby IF
- Number: 19

College career
Years	Team	Apps	(Gls)
2022–	LSU Tigers	60	(19)

Senior career*
Years	Team	Apps	(Gls)
2016–2019	Fylkir	26	(7)
2020–2023	Valur	50	(10)
2024–2026	FH	31	(19)
2026–	Hammarby IF	8	(5)

International career^{‡}
2018–2019	Iceland U-17	9	(1)
2019	Iceland U-19	3	(0)
2021–	Iceland	11	(1)
- * Club domestic league appearances and goals as of 22 November 2026 ‡ National team caps and goals as of 15 October 2026

Ída Marín Hermannsdóttir (born 13 July 2002) is an Icelandic footballer who plays as a midfielder and forward for Hammarby IF and the Iceland national team.

== International career ==
Ída Marín made her debut for the Iceland national team on 30 November 2021, coming on as a substitute for Dagný Brynjarsdóttir in the match against Cyprus.

=== International ===
As of 13 October 2026

Scores and results list Finland's goal tally first, score column indicates score after each Hermannsdóttir goal.

List of international goals scored by Ída Marín Hermannsdóttir
No.	Date	Venue	Cap	Opponent	Score	Result	Competition
1	13 October 2026	Laugardalsvöllur, Reykjavík, Iceland	15	Croatia	2–0	5–0	2027 FIFA Women's World Cup play-offs

== Personal life ==
Ída Marín is the daughter of former footballers Hermann Hreiðarsson and Ragna Lóa Stefánsdóttir, both of whom represented Iceland at international level.
