= Harpa Þorsteinsdóttir =

Icelandic footballer

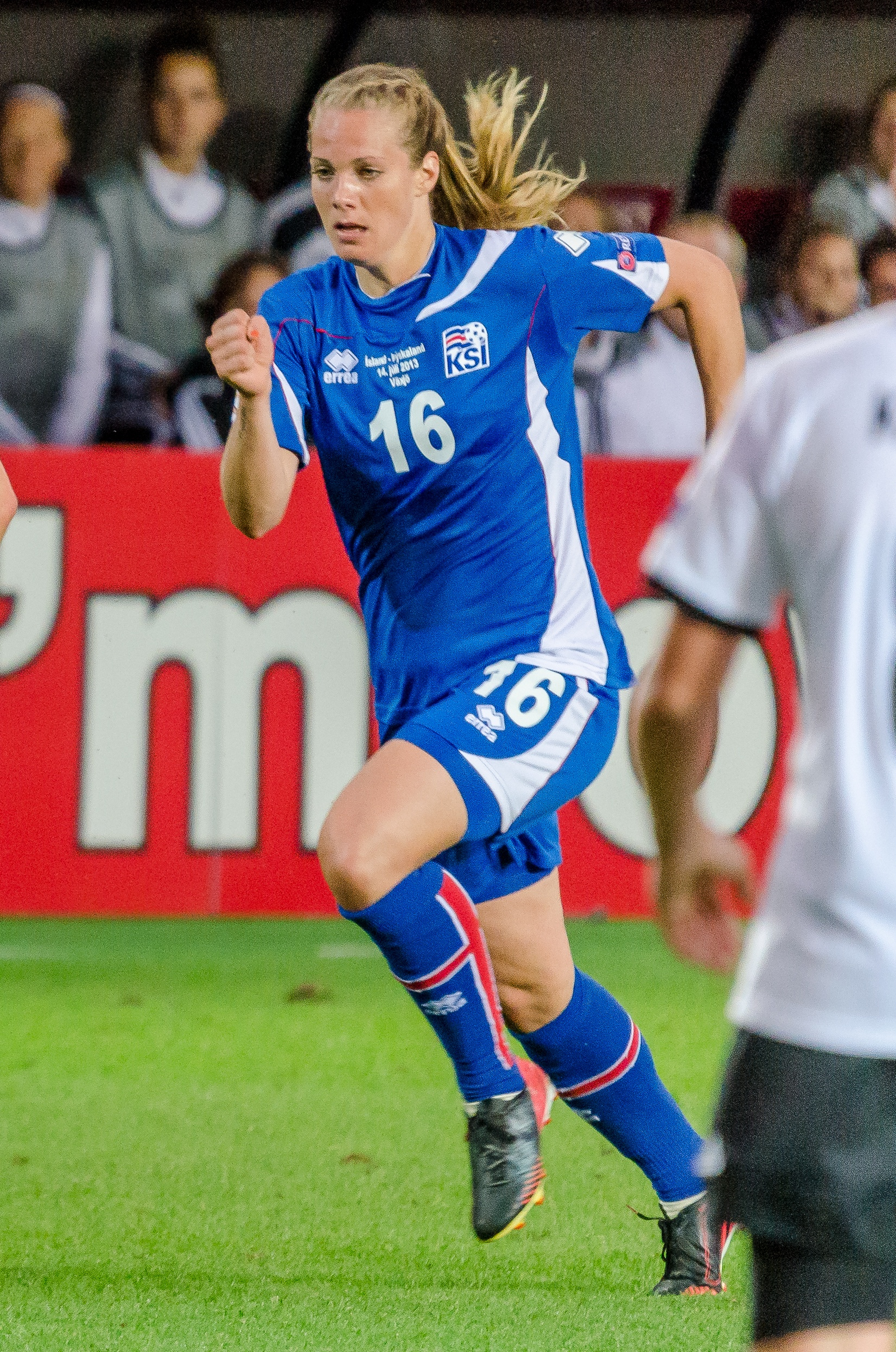
- Harpa with Iceland in 2013

Personal information
- Date of birth: 27 June 1986 (age 40)
- Place of birth: Garðabær, Iceland
- Position: Striker

Senior career*
Years	Team	Apps	(Gls)
2002–2007	Stjarnan	84	(34)
2008–2010	Breiðablik	47	(23)
2011–2018	Stjarnan	120	(123)

International career^{‡}
2002–2003	Iceland U17	9	(2)
2003–2004	Iceland U19	8	(3)
2006	Iceland U21	3	(0)
2006–2018	Iceland	67	(19)
- * Club domestic league appearances and goals as of 20 March 2020 ‡ National team caps and goals as of 22 March 2017

Harpa Þorsteinsdóttir (born 27 June 1986) is an Icelandic former footballer who played as a striker. During her career, she won the Úrvalsdeild four times and the Icelandic Cup three times. She scored 181 goals in 252 matches in the Úrvalsdeild, and was the league's top scorer on three occasions. She played 67 matches for the Iceland national team, scoring 19 goals.

== Club career ==
She played for Stjarnan from 2002 to 2007 before moving to Breiðablik. In 2011, she moved back to Stjarnan. In 2013 Harpa was top goalscorer in the Úrvalsdeild kvenna with 28 goals in 18 games. On 17 August 2018, Harpa tore her anterior cruciate ligament in the Icelandic cup finals where Stjarnan lost 1–2 against Breiðablik. After missing the 2019 season, she announced her retirement in March 2020.

== International career ==
Harpa made her debut for the Iceland national team in March 2006, a 1–0 friendly defeat to England at Carrow Road. She broke her leg in July 2009 and was removed from Iceland's UEFA Women's Euro 2009 squad, to be replaced by Kristín Ýr Bjarnadóttir.

National team coach Siggi Eyjólfsson selected Harpa in the Iceland squad for UEFA Women's Euro 2013.

== Personal life ==
In April 2011 Harpa gave birth to son Steinar Karl. She returned to competitive football three months later.

== Honours ==
=== Club ===
Stjarnan

Winner
- Úrvalsdeild: 2011, 2013, 2014, 2016
- Icelandic Women's Cup: 2012, 2014, 2015
- Icelandic Women's Football League Cup: 2013
- Icelandic Women's Super Cup: 2012

Runner-up
- Icelandic Women's Super Cup: 2013

== International goals ==
No.	Date	Venue	Opponent	Score	Result	Competition
1.	11 March 2009	Olhão, Portugal	China	1–1	1–2	2009 Algarve Cup
2.	7 March 2014	Lagos, Portugal	Norway	2–1	2–1	2014 Algarve Cup
3.	12 March 2014	Albufeira, Portugal	Sweden	1–0	2–1	2014 Algarve Cup
4.	12 March 2014	Albufeira, Portugal	Sweden	2–1	2–1	2014 Algarve Cup
5.	10 April 2014	Ta'Qali, Malta	Malta	1–0	8–0	2015 FIFA Women's World Cup qualification
6.	10 April 2014	Ta'Qali, Malta	Malta	4–0	8–0	2015 FIFA Women's World Cup qualification
7.	10 April 2014	Ta'Qali, Malta	Malta	6–0	8–0	2015 FIFA Women's World Cup qualification
8.	17 September 2014	Reykjavík, Iceland	Serbia	1–0	9–1	2015 FIFA Women's World Cup qualification
9.	17 September 2014	Reykjavík, Iceland	Serbia	7–1	9–1	2015 FIFA Women's World Cup qualification
10.	22 October 2015	Skopje, North Macedonia	North Macedonia	3–0	4–0	UEFA Women's Euro 2017 qualifying
11.	26 October 2015	Lendava, Slovenia	Slovenia	1–0	6–0	UEFA Women's Euro 2017 qualifying
12.	26 October 2015	Lendava, Slovenia	Slovenia	6–0	6–0	UEFA Women's Euro 2017 qualifying
13.	12 April 2016	Minsk, Belarus	Belarus	2–0	5–0	UEFA Women's Euro 2017 qualifying
14.	12 April 2016	Minsk, Belarus	Belarus	3–0	5–0	UEFA Women's Euro 2017 qualifying
15.	12 April 2016	Minsk, Belarus	Belarus	4–0	5–0	UEFA Women's Euro 2017 qualifying
16.	3 June 2016	Falkirk, Scotland	Scotland	2–0	4–0	UEFA Women's Euro 2017 qualifying
17.	8 June 2016	Reykjavík, Iceland	North Macedonia	2–0	8–0	UEFA Women's Euro 2017 qualifying
18.	8 June 2016	Reykjavík, Iceland	North Macedonia	5–0	8–0	UEFA Women's Euro 2017 qualifying
19.	8 June 2016	Reykjavík, Iceland	North Macedonia	6–0	8–0	UEFA Women's Euro 2017 qualifying
20.	10 April 2018	Tórshavn, Faroe Islands	Faroe Islands	3–0	5–0	2019 FIFA Women's World Cup qualification
