= 1985–86 DFB-Pokal Frauen =

Tournament details
- Country: Germany
- Teams: 16

Final positions
- Champions: TSV Siegen
- Runners-up: SSG Bergisch Gladbach

Tournament statistics
- Matches played: 16
- Goals scored: 62 (3.88 per match)

The Frauen DFB-Pokal 1985–86 was the 6th season of the cup competition, Germany's second-most important title in women's football. In the final which was held in Berlin on 3 May 1986 TSV Siegen defeated SSG Bergisch Gladbach 2–0, thus winning their first national title.

== Participants ==
Northern region	Western region	Southwestern region	Southern region	Berlin
Bremen: Bremer TS Neustadt; Hamburg: FTSV Lorbeer Rothenburgsort; Lower Saxony: VfR Eintracht Wolfsburg; Schleswig-Holstein: Schmalfelder SV	Middle Rhine: SSG Bergisch Gladbach; Lower Rhine: KBC Duisburg; Westphalia: TSV Siegen	Rhineland: SC 07 Bad Neuenahr; Saarland: VfR 09 Saabrücken; Southwest: TuS Niederkirchen	Baden Klinge Seckach; Bavaria Bayern Munich; Hesse: SV Flörsheim; South Baden: TuS Binzen; Württemberg: SV Oberteuringen	Berlin: BFC Meteor 06

== First round ==
KBC Duisburg	6 – 0	Schmalfelder SV
SSG Bergisch Gladbach	1 – 0	VfR Eintracht Wolfsburg
BTS Neustadt Bremen	0 – 4	TSV Siegen
BFC Meteor 06	0 – 0	FTSV Lorbeer Rothenburgsort	(aet)
SV Flörsheim	2 – 3	Klinge Seckach	(aet)
VfR 09 Saarbrücken	0 – 4	Bayern Munich
TuS Niederkirchen	7 – 0	SV Oberteuringen
TuS Binzen	0 – 4	SC 07 Bad Neuenahr

=== Replay ===
FTSV Lorbeer Rothenburgsort	1 – 0	BFC Meteor 06

== Quarter-finals ==
TSV Siegen	5 – 0	KBC Duisburg
Bayern Munich	5 – 0	Klinge Seckach
TuS Niederkirchen	2 – 4	SC 07 Bad Neuenahr
FTSV Lorbeer Rothenburgsort	0 – 4	SSG Bergisch Gladbach

== Semi-finals ==
SC 07 Bad Neuenahr	0 – 3	TSV Siegen
Bayern Munich	0 – 5	SSG Bergisch Gladbach

== Final ==
3 May 1986

TSV Siegen	2 – 0	SSG Bergisch Gladbach
Chaladyniak 37'; Fischbach 66'

Olympic Stadium (Berlin)
Attendance: 50,000
Referee: Günter Wiesel (Ottbergen)

TSV SIEGEN:
GK	1	(Germany) Rosemarie Neuser
DF	(Germany) Manuela Kozany
DF	(Germany) Andrea Haberlaß
DF	(Germany) Karin Sänger
DF	(Germany) Ingrid Göbel	(substituted off) 70'
MF	(Germany) Silvia Neid
MF	(Germany) Petra Bartelmann
MF	(Germany) Sissy Raith
MF	(Germany) Melitta Thomas
FW	Beate Henkel
FW	(Germany) Christine Chaladyniak	(substituted off) 66'
Substitutes:
(Germany) Petra Hamm	(substituted on) 70'
(Germany) Heike Fischbach	(substituted on) 66'
Manager:
(Germany) Gerhard Neuser

SSG 09 BERGISCH GLADBACH:
GK	1	(Germany) Andrea Krieger
DF	(Germany) Erika Neuenfeldt
DF	(Germany) Bettina Krug
DF	(Germany) Monika Degwitz
DF	(Germany) Gaby Dlugi-Winterberg
MF	(Germany) Gisela Dahl
MF	(Germany) Anne Knüpp
MF	(Germany) Adele Corica	(substituted off) 63'
MF	(Germany) Petra Meyer	(substituted off) 41'
FW	(Iceland) Laufey Sigurðardóttir
FW	(Germany) Doris Kresimon
Substitutes:
(Germany) Lori Winkel	(substituted on) 63'
(Germany) Nicole Hartmann	(substituted on) 41'
Manager:
(Germany) Anne Trabant-Haarbach

== See also ==
- 1985–86 DFB-Pokal men's competition
