= Ásthildur Helgadóttir =

Icelandic footballer

Personal information
- Full name: Ásthildur Helgadóttir
- Date of birth: 9 May 1976 (age 50)
- Place of birth: Reykjavík, Iceland
- Height: 1.78 m (5 ft 10 in)
- Positions: Striker; midfielder

Youth career
- 1997–2000: Vanderbilt Commodores

Senior career*
Years	Team	Apps	(Gls)
1991–1992	Breiðablik	28	(7)
1993–1994	KR	25	(23)
1994–1997	Breiðablik	35	(31)
1998–2000	KR	34	(34)
2001	Carolina Courage	0	(0)
2001	Boston Renegades		
2001	ÍBV	5	(2)
2002–2003	KR	26	(36)
2003–2007	Malmö	58	(46)

International career^{‡}
1991–1992	Iceland U-17	10	(1)
1993–1998	Iceland U-21	20	(7)
1993–2007	Iceland	69	(23)
- * Club domestic league appearances and goals as of 13:15, 7 August 2013 (UTC) ‡ National team caps and goals as of 13:15, 7 August 2013 (UTC)

Ásthildur Helgadóttir (born 9 May 1976) is an Icelandic former footballer who played club football in America and Sweden, as well as her native Iceland. She played as a forward, or midfielder. From 1993 until her retirement in 2007 she represented the Iceland women's national football team, winning 69 caps and scoring 23 goals. She is the elder sister of Iceland national team goalkeeper Þóra Björg Helgadóttir.
