= Þórunn Helga Jónsdóttir =

Icelandic footballer (born 1984)

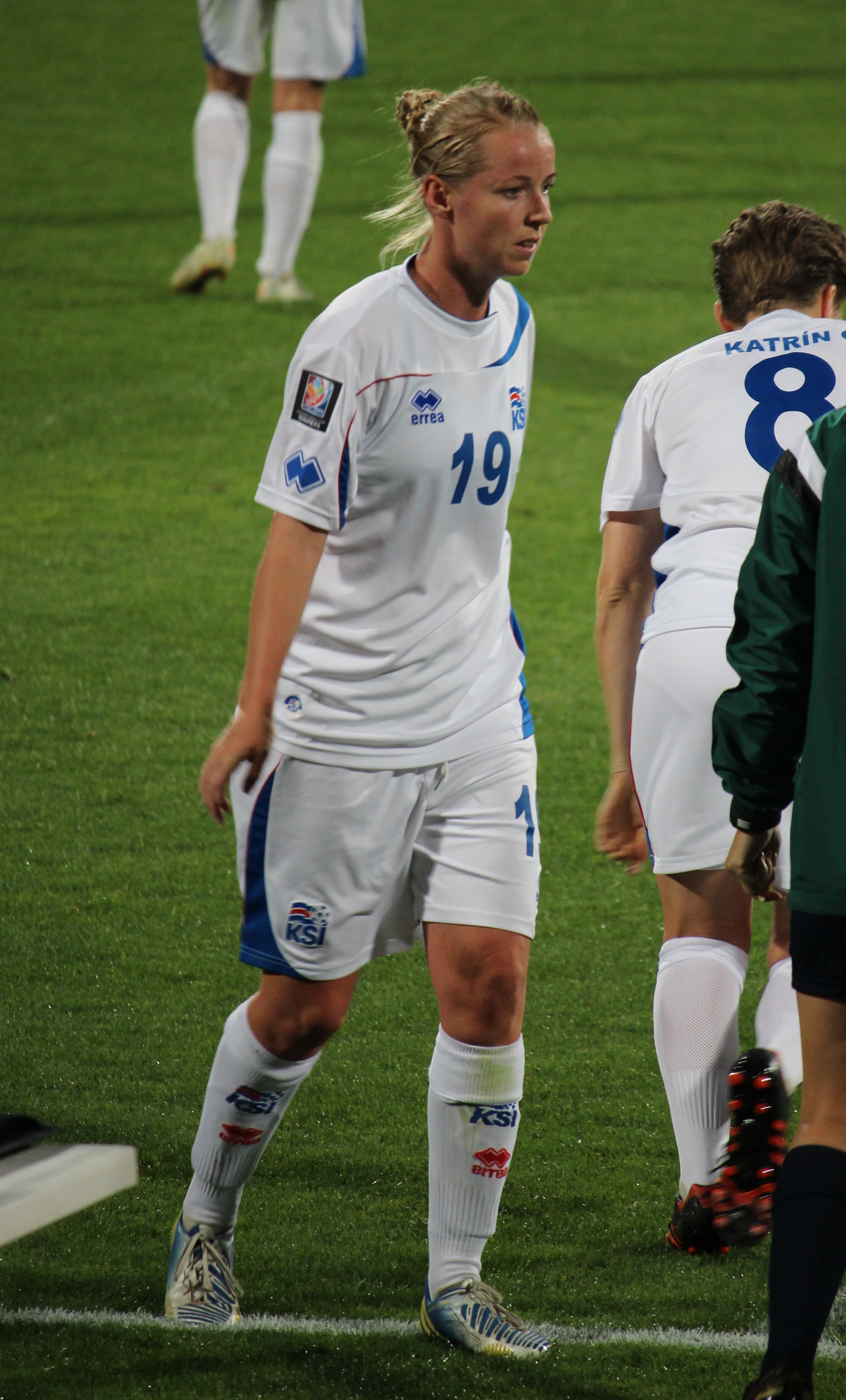
- Þórunn Helga playing for Iceland in 2014

Personal information
- Full name: Þórunn Helga Jónsdóttir
- Date of birth: 17 December 1984 (age 41)
- Place of birth: Reykjavík, Iceland
- Height: 1.70 m (5 ft 7 in)
- Position: Midfielder

Team information
- Current team: KR
- Number: 20

College career
Years	Team	Apps	(Gls)
2004	Rhode Island Rams		

Senior career*
Years	Team	Apps	(Gls)
2001–2008	KR	94	(10)
2009–2010	Santos		
2011	Flamengo		
2012	Vitória		
2013–2016	Avaldsnes IL	67	(0)
2017-	KR	56	(0)

International career^{‡}
2001	Iceland U-17	4	(0)
2002	Iceland U-19	1	(0)
2002–2005	Iceland U-21	7	(0)
2009–	Iceland	9	(0)
- * Club domestic league appearances and goals as of 5 May 2013 ‡ National team caps and goals as of 5 May 2013

Þórunn Helga Jónsdóttir (born 17 December 1984) is an Icelandic footballer who currently plays for KR as a defensive midfielder. Þórunn Helga is part of Iceland's national team and has played professional football in Brazil.

== Club career ==
In 2004 Þórunn Helga played varsity soccer for Rhode Island Rams and was named Atlantic 10 Rookie of the Year.

Following her return to KR, Þórunn Helga signed for Brazilian club Santos in October 2008. There she found success in the Copa Libertadores Femenina in both 2009 and 2010.

After a year with Flamengo in 2011 and Vitória in 2012, Þórunn Helga signed with Norway's Avaldsnes for the 2013 season.

== International career ==
Þórunn Helga was called into the senior Iceland squad for the first time in July 2009, for friendlies against England and Denmark. She was not selected for UEFA Women's Euro 2009, but four years later, national team coach Siggi Eyjólfsson included her in the Iceland squad for UEFA Women's Euro 2013.
