= Laufey Sigurðardóttir =

Icelandic footballer

Personal information
- Date of birth: 27 January 1963 (age 63)
- Place of birth: Akureyri, Iceland
- Position: Forward

Senior career*
Years	Team	Apps	(Gls)
1973–1985	ÍA		
1985–1986	SV Bergisch Gladbach 09		
1987	ÍA		
1988	Stjarnan		(10)
1991	ÍA	14	(16)
1992–1993	Stjarnan	18	(5)
1994–2003	ÍA	53	(23)

International career
1984–1997	Iceland	18	(0)
- * Club domestic league appearances and goals

Laufey Sigurðardóttir (born 27 January 1963) is an Icelandic former multi-sport athlete who was a member of the Iceland national teams in badminton, football and handball. A prominent goalscorer in football, she led the Icelandic top-tier league in goals scored in 1983 and 1991.

== Football ==
Laufey started her senior team career with Íþróttabandalag Akraness (ÍA) in 1973. She led the Icelandic top-tier league in scoring in 1983 and helped the team to back-to-back national championships in 1984 and 1985. On 21 July 1983, she scored 8 goals in a 12–1 win against Víðir Garður.

Laufey played for SV Bergisch Gladbach 09 during the 1985–1986 season. An injury in the DFB-Pokal final on 3 May 1986 cut her season short and she was forced to miss the rest of the West Germany championship where her team finished second. She returned to ÍA prior to the 1987 season where she had a hot start, scoring 7 goals in the first 6 matches and helped the team win the national championship. Following the season, she signed with Stjarnan. After one season with Stjarnan, she moved to Kansas City in the United States where she played for Gino Shiraldis and Hurray.

She returned to ÍA in 1991 and took the league by a storm, leading it in goals scored and was named the Player of the Year in 1991 while helping the club win the Icelandic Cup.

After initially planning on sitting out the 1992 season following the birth of her second child, she signed Stjarnan in July 1992. After two seasons with Stjarnan, Laufey returned again to ÍA in 1994. Following the 1997 season, she played sporadically with the club until finally retiring for good in 2003.

== Honours ==
Club

- Úrvalsdeild kvenna: 1984, 1985, 1987
- Icelandic Cup: 1991

Individual

- Úrvalsdeild kvenna Player of the Year: 1991
- Úrvalsdeild kvenna top scorer: 1983, 1991
