= Laufey Ólafsdóttir =

Icelandic footballer

Personal information
- Full name: Laufey Ólafsdóttir
- Date of birth: 10 June 1981 (age 45)
- Place of birth: Iceland
- Position: Midfielder

Senior career*
Years	Team	Apps	(Gls)
1996–1998	Valur	30	(22)
2000–2001	Breiðablik	23	(9)
2002	ÍBV	14	(2)
2003–2011	Valur	59	(34)

International career
1995–1998	Iceland U17	18	(1)
1997	Iceland U19	1	(0)
1996–2001	Iceland U21	18	(1)
1998–2011	Iceland	26	(1)
- * Club domestic league appearances and goals

Laufey Ólafsdóttir is an Icelandic football midfielder who plays in the Úrvalsdeild kvenna for Valur, with whom she has also played the Champions League. She was named Icelandic Player of the Year in 2004 and 2005.

She has been a member of the Icelandic national team.
