= Olga Færseth =

Icelandic multi-sport athlete

Personal information
- Full name: Andrea Olga Færseth
- Date of birth: 6 October 1975 (age 51)
- Place of birth: Keflavík, Iceland
- Height: 1.60 m (5 ft 3 in)
- Position: Striker

Youth career
- 1982–1990: Keflavík

Senior career*
Years	Team	Apps	(Gls)
1991	Keflavík	12	(54)
1992–1994	Breiðablik	37	(45)
1995–2002	KR	101	(144)
2003–2005	ÍBV	34	(45)
2006–2008	KR	45	(35)
2010	Selfoss	4	(3)
Total		233	(326)

International career
1991–1992	Iceland U17	9	(6)
1993–1995	Iceland U21	9	(3)
1994–2006	Iceland	54	(14)
Basketball career
Career information
Playing career	1990–1995
Position	Guard
Number	7, 12
Career history
1990–1994	Keflavík
1994–1995	Breiðablik
Career highlights
As player: Úrvalsdeild Domestic Player of the Year (1994); 2x Úrvalsdeild Domestic All-First Team (1993, 1994); 4x Icelandic champion (1992–1995); 2× Icelandic Basketball Cup (1993, 1994)
Medals Women's basketball Representing Iceland Games of the Small States of Europe: Bronze medal – third place / 1993 Malta / National Team
- * Club domestic league appearances and goals

Andrea Olga Færseth (born 6 October 1975) is an Icelandic former multi-sport athlete. She was a member of the Icelandic national teams in both football and basketball. In 1994, Olga won the national championship and national cup in both football and basketball.

== Football ==
=== Club career ===
Olga started her senior career with Keflavík in 1991 but moved to Breiðablik in 1992 where she became Icelandic champion in 1992 and 1994. In 1995 she joined KR where she became Icelandic champion three years in a row (1997-1999). She is the leading scorer in the Icelandic women's top division, scoring 269 goals in 217 games.

=== International career ===
Olga played 54 games for the Icelandic national football team, scoring 14 goals.

=== Honours ===
==== Club ====
- Úrvalsdeild: 1992, 1994, 1997, 1998, 1999, 2002
- Icelandic Women's Cup: 1994, 1999, 2002, 2004, 2007, 2008

==== Individual ====
- Úrvalsdeild player of the year: 1998, 2001
- Icelandic Footballer of the Year: 2001
- Úrvalsdeild top goal scorer: 1994, 1997, 1998, 2000, 2001, 2002

== Basketball ==
=== Club career ===
Olga played for five seasons in the Icelandic top-tier league, winning the national championship four times. She was voted the domestic player of the year in 1994 and was twice selected for the domestic All-first team, in 1993 and 1994. In 1994 she set a finals record by scoring 111 points in the finals series (22.2 points per game). The record stood for 22 years until it was broken by Haiden Denise Palmer in 2016. She spent the 1995-96 season in the United States, playing for Brewton–Parker College in Georgia. After tearing a cruciate ligament in her knee in 1996 she decided to retire from basketball and focus solely on football.

=== International career ===
Between 1991 and 1994, Olga played 16 games for the Icelandic national basketball team. She was a member of the team that won bronze at the 1993 Games of the Small States of Europe in Malta.

=== Honours ===
==== Club ====
- Icelandic champion: 1992, 1993, 1994, 1995
- Icelandic Basketball Cup: 1993, 1994

==== Individual ====
- Úrvalsdeild Domestic Player of the Year (1994)
- Úrvalsdeild Domestic All-First Team (1993, 1994)
