= Besta deild kvenna =

Top tier women's football league in Iceland

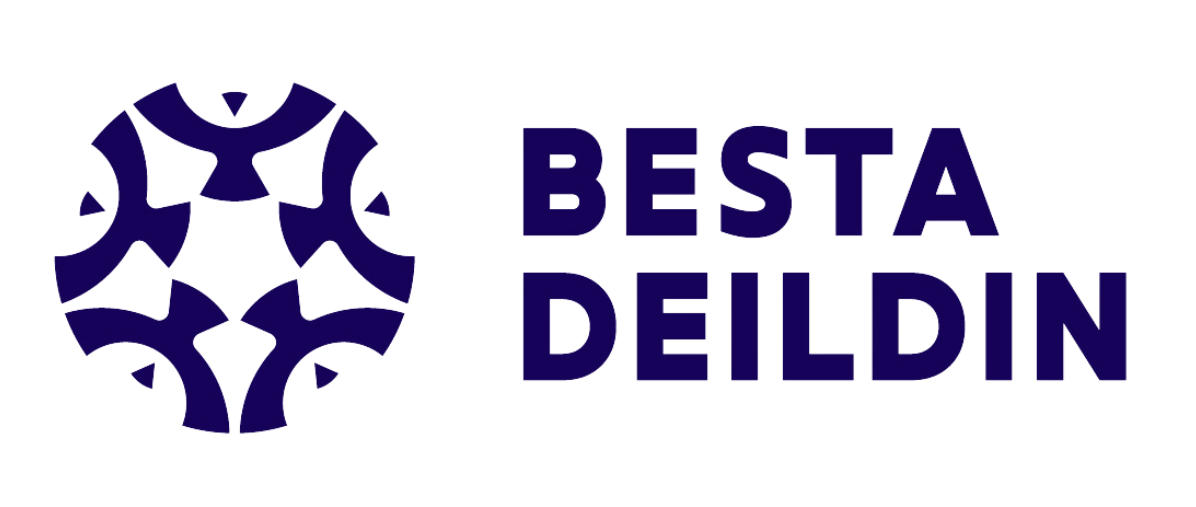
- Founded: 1972
- Country: Iceland
- Confederation: UEFA
- Number of clubs: 10
- Level on pyramid: 1
- Relegation to: 1. deild kvenna
- Domestic cup: Icelandic Cup
- League cup: Icelandic Football League Cup
- International cup: UEFA Champions League
- Current champions: Breiðablik (2025)
- Most championships: Breiðablik (20 titles)
- Website: ksi.is
- Current: 2026 Besta deild kvenna

The Besta deild kvenna (lit. 'Women's Best Division') is the top-tier women's football league in Iceland. It features 10 teams that play a double round robin to decide the champion, which qualifies for a spot in the UEFA Women's Champions League. The 2022 season was the first season of the league after it was rebranded as Besta deild kvenna; previously, it had been named Úrvalsdeild kvenna (lit. 'Women's Elite League').

== History ==
The Icelandic women's tournament began in 1972. Eight teams competed in two groups and the top team from each group, FH and Ármann. met in a final where FH won 2–0. In 1976, only five team registered for competition so the group arrangement was abandoned and instead the teams played in one division with home and away games. The following years, fewer and fewer teams participated, due to lack of training, lack of access to Grass fields, and little or none youth programs. After only three teams participating in 1980, the tide turned the following season with five new teams registering for competition and the addition of the Icelandic Women's Football Cup. On 24 February 2022, the league was rebranded as Besta deild kvenna.

== Champions ==
The list of all champions:

- 1972: FH
- 1973: Ármann
- 1974: FH
- 1975: FH
- 1976: FH
- 1977: Breiðablik
- 1978: Valur
- 1979: Breiðablik
- 1980: Breiðablik
- 1981: Breiðablik
- 1982: Breiðablik
- 1983: Breiðablik
- 1984: ÍA
- 1985: ÍA
- 1986: Valur
- 1987: ÍA
- 1988: Valur
- 1989: Valur
- 1990: Breiðablik
- 1991: Breiðablik
- 1992: Breiðablik
- 1993: KR
- 1994: Breiðablik
- 1995: Breiðablik
- 1996: Breiðablik
- 1997: KR
- 1998: KR
- 1999: KR
- 2000: Breiðablik
- 2001: Breiðablik
- 2002: KR
- 2003: KR
- 2004: Valur
- 2005: Breiðablik
- 2006: Valur
- 2007: Valur
- 2008: Valur
- 2009: Valur
- 2010: Valur
- 2011: Stjarnan
- 2012: Þór/KA
- 2013: Stjarnan
- 2014: Stjarnan
- 2015: Breiðablik
- 2016: Stjarnan
- 2017: Þór/KA
- 2018: Breiðablik
- 2019: Valur
- 2020: Breiðablik
- 2021: Valur
- 2022: Valur
- 2023: Valur
- 2024: Breiðablik
- 2025: Breiðablik

== By club ==
Club	Titles
Breiðablik	20
Valur	14
KR	6
FH	4
Stjarnan	4
ÍA	3
Þór/KA	2
Ármann	1

== Players ==
=== Players of the year ===
Year	Player	Club
1986	(Iceland) Kristín Arnþórsdóttir	Valur
1987	(Iceland) Guðrún Sæmundsdóttir	Valur
1988	(Iceland) Guðrún Sæmundsdóttir	Valur
1989	(Iceland) Arna Steinsen	KR
1990	(Iceland) Vanda Sigurgeirsdóttir	Breiðablik
1991	(Iceland) Laufey Sigurðardóttir	ÍA
1992	(Iceland) Jónína Víglundsdóttir	ÍA
1993	(Iceland) Jónína Víglundsdóttir	ÍA
1994	(Iceland) Margrét Ólafsdóttir	Breiðablik
1995	(Iceland) Guðlaug Jónsdóttir	KR
1996	(Iceland) Ásthildur Helgadóttir	Breiðablik
1997	(Iceland) Guðrún Jóna Kristjánsdóttir	KR
1998	(Iceland) Olga Færseth	KR
1999	(Iceland) Guðlaug Jónsdóttir	KR
2000	(Iceland) Rakel Ögmundsdóttir	Breiðablik
2001	(Iceland) Olga Færseth	KR
2002	(Iceland) Ásthildur Helgadóttir	Breiðablik
2003	(Iceland) Ásthildur Helgadóttir	Breiðablik
2004	(Iceland) Laufey Ólafsdóttir	Valur
2005	(Iceland) Laufey Ólafsdóttir	Valur
2006	(Iceland) Margrét Lára Viðarsdóttir	Valur
2007	(Iceland) Hólmfríður Magnúsdóttir	KR
2008	(Iceland) Dóra María Lárusdóttir	Valur
2009	(Iceland) Katrín Jónsdóttir	Valur
2010	(Iceland) Dóra María Lárusdóttir	Valur
2011	(Iceland) Gunnhildur Yrsa Jónsdóttir	Stjarnan
2012	(United States) Chantel Jones	Þór/KA
2013	(Iceland) Harpa Þorsteinsdóttir	Stjarnan
2014	(Iceland) Harpa Þorsteinsdóttir	Stjarnan
2015	(Iceland) Fanndís Friðriksdóttir	Breiðablik
2016	(Iceland) Harpa Þorsteinsdóttir	Stjarnan
2017	(Mexico) Stephany Mayor	Þór/KA
2018	(Iceland) Sandra Jessen	Þór/KA
2019	(Iceland) Elín Metta Jensen	Valur
2020	(Iceland) Sveindís Jane Jónsdóttir	Breiðablik
2021	(Iceland) Agla María Albertsdóttir	Breiðablik

=== Top goalscorers of all time ===
#	Player	Years	Goals	Apps	Goals per game
1	Olga Færseth	1992–2008	269	217	1.24
2	Margrét Lára Viðarsdóttir	2000–2008, 2016–2019	207	143	1.46
3	Harpa Þorsteinsdóttir	2002–2018	181	252	0.72
4	Ásta Breiðfjörð Gunnlaugsdóttir	1976–1995	154	143	1.08
4	Helena Ólafsdóttir	1986–2001	154	193	0.80
6	Hrefna Huld Jóhannesdóttir	1995–2009	147	176	0.84
7	Berglind Björg Þorvaldsdóttir	2007–2020, 2024-	140	199	0.70
8	Laufey Sigurðardóttir	1981–1998	137	178	0.77
9	Elín Metta Jensen	2010–	134	189	0.71
10	Ásthildur Helgadóttir	1991–2003	133	153	0.87
11	Rakel Hönnudóttir	2006–2017, 2020	125	215	0.58
12	Hólmfríður Magnúsdóttir	2000–2008, 2011, 2017–2021	124	167	0.75
13	Fanndís Friðriksdóttir	2005–2012, 2014–2017, 2018-	118	248	0.48
14	Sandra María Jessen	2012–2018, 2022-	107	170	0.63
15	Kristín Ýr Bjarnadóttir	2000–2004, 2008–2011, 2013–2016	102	153	0.67
16	Ásgerður Ingibergsdóttir	1992–2005	97	162	0.60
17	Dóra María Lárusdóttir	2001–2010, 2012–2014, 2016–2021	94	269	0.35
18	Katrín Ásbjörnsdóttir	2009–	91	207	0.44
18	Guðrún Jóna Kristjánsdóttir	1985–2004	91	215	0.42
18	Rakel Logadóttir	1997–2014	91	216	0.42

Source: KSI

=== Top scorers by season ===
Season	Name	Goals	Club
1990	(Iceland) Helena Ólafsdóttir	7	KR
1991	(Iceland) Laufey Sigurðardóttir	16	ÍA
1992	(Iceland) Guðný Guðnadóttir	15	Stjarnan
1993	(Iceland) Guðný Guðnadóttir	12	Stjarnan
1994	(Iceland) Olga Færseth	24	Breiðablik
1995	(Iceland) Margrét Rannveig Ólafsdóttir	13	Breiðablik
1996	(Iceland) Ásthildur Helgadóttir	17	Breiðablik
1997	(Iceland) Olga Færseth	19	KR
1998	(Iceland) Olga Færseth	23	KR
1999	(Iceland) Ásgerður Hildur Ingibergsdóttir	20	Valur
2000	(Iceland) Olga Færseth	26	KR
2001	(Iceland) Olga Færseth	28	KR
2002	(Iceland) Olga Færseth	20	KR
2002	(Iceland) Ásthildur Helgadóttir	20	KR
2003	(Iceland) Hrefna Huld Jóhannesdóttir	21	KR
2004	(Iceland) Margrét Lára Viðarsdóttir	23	ÍBV
2005	(Iceland) Margrét Lára Viðarsdóttir	23	Valur
2006	(Iceland) Margrét Lára Viðarsdóttir	34	Valur
2007	(Iceland) Margrét Lára Viðarsdóttir	38	Valur
2008	(Iceland) Margrét Lára Viðarsdóttir	32	Valur
2009	(Iceland) Kristín Ýr Bjarnadóttir	23	Valur
2009	(Iceland) Rakel Hönnudóttir	23	Þór/KA
2010	(Iceland) Kristín Ýr Bjarnadóttir	23	Valur
2011	(United States) Ashley Bares	21	Stjarnan
2012	(Iceland) Elín Metta Jensen	18	Valur
2012	(Iceland) Sandra María Jessen	18	Þór/KA
2013	(Iceland) Harpa Þorsteinsdóttir	28	Stjarnan
2014	(Iceland) Harpa Þorsteinsdóttir	27	Stjarnan
2015	(Iceland) Fanndís Friðriksdóttir	19	Valur
2016	(Iceland) Harpa Þorsteinsdóttir	20	Stjarnan
2017	(Mexico) Stephany Mayor	19	Þór/KA
2018	(Iceland) Berglind Björg Þorvaldsdóttir	19	Breiðablik
2019	(Iceland) Berglind Björg Þorvaldsdóttir	16	Breiðablik
2019	(Iceland) Hlín Eiríksdóttir	16	Valur
2019	(Iceland) Elín Metta Jensen	16	Valur
2020	(Iceland) Sveindís Jane Jónsdóttir	14	Breiðablik
2020	(Iceland) Agla María Albertsdóttir	14	Breiðablik
2021	(United States) Brenna Lovera	13	Selfoss
2022	(Iceland) Jasmín Erla Ingadóttir	11	Stjarnan
2023	(Iceland) Bryndís Arna Níelsdóttir	15	Valur

== See also ==
- Besta deild karla (men's football league)
