= Breiðablik (women's football) =

Icelandic women's football team

- Full name: Breiðablik
- Nickname: Blikar
- Founded: February 12th 1950
- Ground: Kópavogsvöllur, Kópavogur, Iceland
- Capacity: 5,501 (1,869 seated)
- Chairman: Flosi Eiríksson> Stjórn knattspyrnudeildar Breiðabliks
- Manager: Nik Chamberlain
- League: Besta deild kvenna
- 2025: Champions
- Website: http://breidablik.is
Home colours	Away colours	Third colours

The Breiðablik women's football team is the women's football department of the Breiðablik UBK multi-sport club. It is based in Kópavogur, Iceland, and currently plays in the Besta deild kvenna, the top-tier women's football league in Iceland.

== History ==
The women's football team is the powerhouse of Icelandic women's football and nearly made a clean sweep in 2005, winning the championship and cup plus almost all of the younger division titles. In international competitions Breiðablik has taken part in The Nordic Open Championship in the years 1995, 1996 and 1997 among teams such as Fortuna Hjørring from Denmark, Trondheims Örn from Norway and HJK from Finland.

Breiðablik was the first Icelandic team to earn a seat in The European Women's Cup 2001–02 but due to financial reasons Breiðablik did not participate and KR was therefore the first Icelandic team to take part.

== Current squad ==
As of 25 August 2025

Current squad 2025

== Honours ==
=== League ===
- Úrvalsdeild kvenna (Premier league)
  - Winners (20): 1977, 1979, 1980, 1981, 1982, 1983, 1990, 1991, 1992, 1994, 1995, 1996, 2000, 2001, 2005, 2015, 2018, 2020, 2024, 2025

Runners-up Premier League: 2023, 2021, 2019, 2017, 2016, 2014, 2009, 2006, 2002, 1999, 1997, 1993, 1986, 1985, 1984, 1978, 1976.

- 1. deild kvenna (1st division)
  - Winners (1): 1988

=== Cups ===
- Icelandic Cup
  - Winners (14): 1981, 1982, 1983, 1994, 1996, 1997, 1998, 2000, 2005, 2013, 2016, 2018, 2021, 2025

Runners-up Women's Icelandic Cup: 2024, 2023, 2022, 2009, 2006, 1999, 1986.

- Icelandic League Cup
  - Winners (9): 1996, 1997, 1998, 2001, 2006, 2012, 2019, 2022, 2025

== European record ==
- note that qualifying rounds are a round-robin tournament of one game each against three opponents in the group, rather than a two-game aggregate against a single opponent

Season	Competition	Round	Opponents	Home	Away	Agg
2002–03	UEFA Women's Cup	Second qualifying round: Group 6	(Belarus) Babruyshanka	2–3		
2002–03	UEFA Women's Cup	Second qualifying round: Group 6	(Denmark) Fortuna Hjørring	0–9		
2002–03	UEFA Women's Cup	Second qualifying round: Group 6	(Moldova) Codru Anenii Noi	2–0		
2006–07	UEFA Women's Cup	First qualifying round: Group A3	(Portugal) SU 1° Dezembro	4–0		
2006–07	UEFA Women's Cup	First qualifying round: Group A3	(Austria) Neulengbach	3–0		
2006–07	UEFA Women's Cup	First qualifying round: Group A3	(Northern Ireland) Crusaders Newtownabbey Strikers	7–0		
2006–07	UEFA Women's Cup	Second qualifying round: Group B1	(Finland) HJK Helsinki	2–1		
2006–07	UEFA Women's Cup	Second qualifying round: Group B1	(Germany) 1. FFC Frankfurt	0–5		
2006–07	UEFA Women's Cup	Second qualifying round: Group B1	(Belarus) Universitet Vitebsk	1–0		
2006–07	UEFA Women's Cup	Quarter-finals	(England) Arsenal LFC	0–5	1–4	1–9
2010–11	UEFA Women's Champions League	Qualifying round: Group 4	(Estonia) Levadia Tallinn	8–1		
2010–11	UEFA Women's Champions League	Qualifying round: Group 4	(Romania) FCM Târgu Mureş	7–0		
2010–11	UEFA Women's Champions League	Qualifying round: Group 4	(France) Juvisy	3–3		
2010–11	UEFA Women's Champions League	Round of 32	(France) Juvisy	0–3	0–6	0–9
2016–17	UEFA Women's Champions League	Qualifying round: Group 3	(Serbia) Spartak Subotica	1–1		
2016–17	UEFA Women's Champions League	Qualifying round: Group 3	(Bulgaria) NSA Sofia	5–0		
2016–17	UEFA Women's Champions League	Qualifying round: Group 3	(Wales) Cardiff Met	0–8		
2016–17	UEFA Women's Champions League	Round of 32	(Sweden) Rosengård	0–1	0–0	0–1
2019–20	UEFA Women's Champions League	Qualifying round: Group 1	(Israel) ASA Tel Aviv	1–4		
2019–20	UEFA Women's Champions League	Qualifying round: Group 1	(North Macedonia) Dragon 2014	11–0		
2019–20	UEFA Women's Champions League	Qualifying round: Group 1	(Bosnia and Herzegovina) SFK 2000	3–1		
2019–20	UEFA Women's Champions League	Round of 32	(Czech Republic) Sparta Prague	3–2	1–0	4–2
2019–20	UEFA Women's Champions League	Round of 16	(France) Paris Saint-Germain	0–4	1–3	1–7
2021–22	UEFA Women's Champions League	First qualifying round: Champions Path Tournament 1	(Faroe Islands) KÍ	7–0		
2021–22	UEFA Women's Champions League	First qualifying round: Champions Path Tournament 1	(Lithuania) Gintra Universitetas	0–1		
2021–22	UEFA Women's Champions League	Second qualifying round	(Croatia) Osijek	3–0	1–1	4–1
2021–22	UEFA Women's Champions League	Group stage: Group B	(France) Paris Saint-Germain	0–2	0–6	0–8
2021–22	UEFA Women's Champions League	Group stage: Group B	(Spain) Real Madrid	0–3	0–5	0–8
2021–22	UEFA Women's Champions League	Group stage: Group B	(Ukraine) Zhytlobud-1 Kharkiv	0–2	0–0	0–2
2022–23	UEFA Women's Champions League	First qualifying round: League Path Tournament 2	(Norway) Rosenborg	2–4		
2022–23	UEFA Women's Champions League	First qualifying round: League Path Tournament 2	(Czech Republic) Slovácko	3–0		
2024–25	UEFA Women's Champions League	First qualifying round: League Path Tournament 4	(Belarus) FC Minsk	6–1		
2024–25	UEFA Women's Champions League	First qualifying round: League Path Tournament 4	(Portugal) Sporting CP	0–2		
