= Valur (women's football) =

- Full name: Knattspyrnufélagið Valur
- Nickname: Valsarar
- Ground: Hlíðarendi, Reykjavík, Iceland
- Capacity: 1,524
- Head Coach: Pétur Pétursson
- League: Besta deild kvenna
- 2025: 6th
- Website: valur.is/fotbolti.aspx
Home colours	Away colours

The Valur women's football team, commonly known as Valur, is the women's football department of the Valur multi-sport club. It is based in Reykjavík, Iceland, and currently plays in the Besta deild kvenna, the top-tier women's football league in Iceland. The team plays its home games at Hlíðarendi located in Reykjavík. The team's colors are red and white.

Valur has won the Icelandic championship 11 times and the Icelandic Women's Cup 13 times.

== Recent history ==
In 2017, the team hired Pétur Pétursson as head coach. In September 2019, Valur won the national championship for the eleventh time in its history, and first time since 2010.

== Titles ==
- Besta deild kvenna:
  - Winners (14): 1978, 1986, 1988, 1989, 2004, 2006, 2007, 2008, 2009, 2010, 2019, 2021, 2022, 2023
- Cup Champions: 15

- 1984, 1985, 1986, 1987, 1988, 1990, 1995, 2001, 2003, 2006, 2009, 2010, 2011, 2022, 2024

- Super Cup Champions: 9

- 2004, 2005, 2007, 2008, 2009, 2010, 2011, 2018, 2019, 2022

- Icelandic Women's League Cup: 5

- 2003, 2005, 2007, 2010, 2017

== Current squad ==
- As of 4 July 2022

Note: Flags indicate national team as defined under FIFA eligibility rules; some limited exceptions apply. Players may hold more than one non-FIFA nationality.

No.	Pos.	Nation	Player
1	GK	ISL	Sandra Sigurðardóttir
4	DF	ISL	Arna Ásgrímsdóttir
5	MF	ISL	Lára Pedersen
6	MF	ISL	Mist Edvardsdottir
7	DF	ISL	Elísa Viðarsdóttir
8	MF	ISL	Ásdís Halldórsdóttir
9	FW	ISL	Ída Marín Hermannsdóttir
10	FW	ISL	Elín Metta Jensen
11	DF	ISL	Anna Rakel Pétursdóttir
13	FW	USA	Cyera Hintzen
15	MF	USA	Brookelynn Entz

No.	Pos.	Nation	Player
16	MF	ISL	þórdís Ágústsdóttir
17	MF	ISL	þórdís Sigfúsdóttir
18	DF	ISL	Málfríður Anna Eiríksdóttir
19	FW	ISL	Bryndis Níelsdóttir
20	GK	ISL	Fanney Inga Birkisdótir
21	MF	ISL	Lillý Rut Hlynsdóttir
22	FW	VEN	Mariana Speckmaier
23	FW	ISL	Guðrún Karítas Sigurðardóttir
24	DF	ISL	Mikaela Pétursdóttir
27	MF	ISL	Ásgerður Baldursdóttir
32	FW	ISL	Fanndís Friðriksdóttir
