= KR (women's football) =

- Full name: Knattspyrnufélag Reykjavíkur
- Nickname: KR-ingar
- Short name: KR
- Founded: 16 February 1899; 127 years ago
- Ground: KR-völlur, Reykjavík, Iceland
- Capacity: 2,781 (1,541 seated)
- Website: https://www.kr.is/knattspyrna/
Home colours	Away colours

The KR women's football team is the women's football division of Knattspyrnufélag Reykjavíkur (Reykjavík Football Club), commonly known as KR. It is based in the capital of Iceland, Reykjavík.

== Club honours ==
- Icelandic Championships: 6

1993, 1997, 1998, 1999, 2002, 2003

- Icelandic Cups: 4

1999, 2002, 2007, 2008

- Icelandic League Cups: 4

1999, 2000, 2002, 2008

- Icelandic Super Cup: 3

1994, 1995, 1997

- 1. deild kvenna:

2014

== Current squad ==
- As of 4 July 2022

Note: Flags indicate national team as defined under FIFA eligibility rules; some limited exceptions apply. Players may hold more than one non-FIFA nationality.

No.	Pos.	Nation	Player
2	DF	ISL	Kristín Johnson
3	MF	AUS	Susan Phonsongkham
4	MF	ISL	Laufey Björnsdóttir
5	MF	ISL	Brynja Sævarsdóttir
6	DF	ISL	Rebekka Sverrisdóttir
7	FW	ISL	Guðmunda Óladóttir
8	MF	ISL	Hildur Ágústsdóttir
9	MF	ISL	Ólöf Freyja Þorvaldsdóttir
10	DF	ISL	Inga Ágústsdóttir
11	FW	USA	Marcy Barberic
14	DF	ISL	Rut Matthíasdóttir
17	DF	ISL	Hildur Kristjánsdóttir
18	FW	ISL	Bergdís Einarsdóttir

No.	Pos.	Nation	Player
20	MF	ISL	Ásta Kristinsdóttir
21	DF	SRB	Tijana Krstić
23	GK	SWE	Cornelia Baldi Sundelius
24	MF	ISL	Ísabella Tryggvadóttir
30	DF	AUS	Margaux Chauvet

== Managers ==
- (Iceland) Edda Garðarsdóttir (2016-2017)
- (Iceland) Bojana Kristín Besic (2017-2019)
- (Iceland) Ragna Lóa Stefánsdóttir (2019)
- (Iceland) Jóhannes Karl Sigursteinsson (2019–present)
