= UEFA Women's Euro 2025 Group A =

Football tournament group stage

Group A of UEFA Women's Euro 2025 was played from 2 to 10 July 2025. The group was made up of hosts Switzerland, Norway, Iceland and Finland. The top two teams of the group, Norway and Switzerland, advanced to the quarter-finals.

== Teams ==
Draw position	Team	Pot	Method of qualification	Date of qualification	Finals appearance	Last appearance	Previous best performance	Euro 2025 qualifying rankings (Note: The UEFA Women's Euro 2025 qualifying ranking was used for seeding for the final draw.)	FIFA Rankings June 2025
A1	Switzerland	1	Host	4 April 2023	3rd	2022	Group stage (2017, 2022)	19	23
A2	Norway	3	Play-off winner	3 December 2024	13th	2022	Winners (1987, 1993)	10	16
A3	Iceland	2	Group A4 runners-up	12 July 2024	5th	2022	Quarter-finals (2013)	5	14
A4	Finland	4	Play-off winner	3 December 2024	5th	2022	Semi-finals (2005)	13	26

== Standings ==
Pos	Team	Pld	W	D	L	GF	GA	GD	Pts	Qualification
1	Norway	3	3	0	0	8	5	+3	9	Advance to knockout stage
2	Switzerland (H)	3	1	1	1	4	3	+1	4 (Note: Tied on head-to-head result (Finland 1–1 Switzerland). Overall goal difference was used as the tiebreaker.)	Advance to knockout stage
3	Finland	3	1	1	1	3	3	0	4	
4	Iceland	3	0	0	3	3	7	−4	0	

Source: UEFA
Rules for classification: Group stage tiebreakers
(H) Hosts

== Matches ==
=== Iceland vs Finland ===
2 July 2025
18:00

Iceland	0–1	Finland
	Report	Kosola 70'

Arena Thun, Thun
Attendance: 7,683
Referee: Katalin Kulcsár (Hungary)

Iceland	Finland

GK	1	Cecilía Rán Rúnarsdóttir
RB	20	Guðný Árnadóttir
CB	4	Glódís Perla Viggósdóttir (c)		(substituted off) 46'
CB	6	Ingibjörg Sigurðardóttir
LB	18	Guðrún Arnardóttir
CM	8	Alexandra Jóhannsdóttir
CM	7	Karólína Lea Vilhjálmsdóttir		(substituted off) 84'
CM	16	Hildur Antonsdóttir	(yellow card) 52' (yellow-red card) 58'
RF	14	Hlín Eiríksdóttir		(substituted off) 54'
CF	3	Sandra Jessen		(substituted off) 62'
LF	23	Sveindís Jane Jónsdóttir
Substitutions:
DF	5	Sædís Rún Heiðarsdóttir		(substituted in) 46'
MF	17	Agla María Albertsdóttir		(substituted in) 54'
MF	10	Dagný Brynjarsdóttir		(substituted in) 62'
MF	15	Katla Tryggvadóttir		(substituted in) 84'
Manager:
Þorsteinn Halldórsson

GK	1	Anna Koivunen
RB	5	Emma Koivisto		(substituted off) 78'
CB	15	Natalia Kuikka
CB	3	Eva Nyström	(yellow card) 3'
LB	6	Joanna Tynnilä
RM	9	Katariina Kosola
CM	4	Ria Öling		(substituted off) 90+5'
CM	20	Eveliina Summanen		(substituted off) 90+5'
LM	13	Oona Siren
SS	18	Linda Sällström (c)		(substituted off) 78'
CF	17	Sanni Franssi		(substituted off) 66'
Substitutions:
FW	21	Oona Sevenius		(substituted in) 66'
DF	16	Nea Lehtola		(substituted in) 78'
FW	22	Jutta Rantala		(substituted in) 78'
DF	19	Maaria Roth		(substituted in) 90+5'
MF	2	Vilma Koivisto		(substituted in) 90+5'
Manager:
Marko Saloranta

Player of the Match:
Katariina Kosola (Finland)

Assistant referees:
Anita Vad (Hungary)
Irina Pozdejeva (Lithuania)
Fourth official:
Catarina Campos (Portugal)
Video assistant referee:
Tamás Bognár (Hungary)
Assistant video assistant referee:
Katrin Rafalsky (Germany)

=== Switzerland vs Norway ===
2 July 2025
21:00

Switzerland	1–2	Norway
Riesen 28'	Report	Hegerberg 54'; Stierli 58' (o.g.)

St. Jakob-Park, Basel
Attendance: 34,063
Referee: Alina Peşu (Romania)

Switzerland	Norway

GK	12	Livia Peng
CB	18	Viola Calligaris
CB	2	Julia Stierli		(substituted off) 87'
CB	5	Noelle Maritz
RWB	19	Iman Beney
LWB	8	Nadine Riesen
CM	4	Noemi Ivelj		(substituted off) 63'
CM	13	Lia Wälti (c)
CM	14	Smilla Vallotto	(yellow card) 90+6'
CF	6	Géraldine Reuteler
CF	7	Riola Xhemaili		(substituted off) 63'
Substitutions:
FW	20	Alayah Pilgrim		(substituted in) 63'
FW	22	Sydney Schertenleib		(substituted in) 63'
DF	9	Ana-Maria Crnogorčević		(substituted in) 87'
Manager:
(Sweden) Pia Sundhage

GK	1	Cecilie Fiskerstrand
RB	13	Thea Bjelde	(yellow card) 85'
CB	6	Maren Mjelde		(substituted off) 64'
CB	4	Tuva Hansen
LB	2	Marit Bratberg Lund
CM	8	Vilde Bøe Risa		(substituted off) 64'
CM	10	Caroline Graham Hansen		(substituted off) 90+2'
CM	7	Ingrid Syrstad Engen
RF	18	Frida Maanum		(substituted off) 75'
CF	14	Ada Hegerberg (c)		(substituted off) 75'
LF	11	Guro Reiten
Substitutions:
DF	16	Mathilde Harviken		(substituted in) 64'
MF	21	Lisa Naalsund		(substituted in) 64'
MF	19	Elisabeth Terland		(substituted in) 75'
FW	17	Celin Bizet		(substituted in) 75'
FW	20	Synne Jensen		(substituted in) 90+2'
Manager:
(England) Gemma Grainger

Player of the Match:
Géraldine Reuteler (Switzerland)

Assistant referees:
Daniela Constatinescu (Romania)
Svitlana Grushko (Ukraine)
Fourth official:
Marta Huerta de Aza (Spain)
Video assistant referee:
Dennis Higler (Netherlands)
Assistant video assistant referee:
Cătălin Popa (Romania)

=== Norway vs Finland ===
6 July 2025
18:00

Norway	2–1	Finland
Nyström 3' (o.g.); Graham Hansen 84'	Report	Sevenius 32'

Stade de Tourbillon, Sion
Attendance: 7,376
Referee: Silvia Gasperotti (Italy)

Norway	Finland

GK	1	Cecilie Fiskerstrand
RB	13	Thea Bjelde
CB	16	Mathilde Harviken
CB	4	Tuva Hansen
LB	2	Marit Bratberg Lund
CM	8	Vilde Bøe Risa	(substituted off) 46'
CM	10	Caroline Graham Hansen	(substituted off) 87'
CM	7	Ingrid Syrstad Engen
RF	18	Frida Maanum	(substituted off) 46'
CF	14	Ada Hegerberg (c)	(substituted off) 90+2'
LF	11	Guro Reiten
Substitutions:
MF	21	Lisa Naalsund	(substituted in) 46'
MF	22	Signe Gaupset	(substituted in) 46'
FW	17	Celin Bizet	(substituted in) 87'
FW	9	Karina Sævik	(substituted in) 90+2'
Manager:
(England) Gemma Grainger

GK	1	Anna Koivunen
CB	15	Natalia Kuikka
CB	3	Eva Nyström
CB	6	Joanna Tynnilä	(substituted off) 87'
RWB	5	Emma Koivisto	(substituted off) 72'
LWB	9	Katariina Kosola
RM	4	Ria Öling	(substituted off) 61'
CM	13	Oona Siren
CM	20	Eveliina Summanen
LM	21	Oona Sevenius	(substituted off) 87'
CF	18	Linda Sällström (c)	(substituted off) 72'
Substitutions:
FW	17	Sanni Franssi	(substituted in) 61'
FW	22	Jutta Rantala	(substituted in) 72'
DF	16	Nea Lehtola	(substituted in) 72'
MF	8	Olga Ahtinen	(substituted in) 87'
DF	7	Anni Hartikainen	(substituted in) 87'
Manager:
Marko Saloranta

Player of the Match:
Caroline Graham Hansen (Norway)

Assistant referees:
Franca Overtoom (Netherlands)
Amina Gutschi (Austria)
Fourth official:
Shona Shukrula (Netherlands)
Video assistant referee:
Aleandro Di Paolo (Italy)
Assistant video assistant referee:
Willy Delajod (France)

=== Switzerland vs Iceland ===
6 July 2025
21:00

Switzerland	2–0	Iceland
Reuteler 76'; Pilgrim 90'	Report

Stadion Wankdorf, Bern
Attendance: 29,658
Referee: Marta Huerta de Aza (Spain)

Switzerland	Iceland

GK	12	Livia Peng
CB	18	Viola Calligaris
CB	2	Julia Stierli	(substituted off) 56'
CB	5	Noelle Maritz
RWB	19	Iman Beney
LWB	8	Nadine Riesen	(substituted off) 78'
CM	6	Géraldine Reuteler
CM	13	Lia Wälti (c)
CM	14	Smilla Vallotto
CF	22	Sydney Schertenleib
CF	17	Svenja Fölmli	(substituted off) 56'
Substitutions:
DF	9	Ana-Maria Crnogorčević	(substituted in) 56'
FW	3	Leila Wandeler	(substituted in) 56'
FW	20	Alayah Pilgrim	(substituted in) 78'
Manager:
(Sweden) Pia Sundhage

GK	1	Cecilía Rán Rúnarsdóttir
RB	20	Guðný Árnadóttir		(substituted off) 34'
CB	4	Glódís Perla Viggósdóttir (c)
CB	6	Ingibjörg Sigurðardóttir	(yellow card) 23'	(substituted off) 81'
LB	18	Guðrún Arnardóttir
CM	8	Alexandra Jóhannsdóttir	(yellow card) 25'	(substituted off) 81'
CM	7	Karólína Lea Vilhjálmsdóttir	(yellow card) 65'
CM	10	Dagný Brynjarsdóttir
RF	17	Agla María Albertsdóttir		(substituted off) 67'
CF	3	Sandra Jessen
LF	23	Sveindís Jane Jónsdóttir
Substitutions:
DF	5	Sædís Rún Heiðarsdóttir		(substituted in) 34'
DF	21	Hafrún Rakel Halldórsdóttir		(substituted in) 67'
MF	15	Katla Tryggvadóttir		(substituted in) 81'
DF	19	Áslaug Munda Gunnlaugsdóttir		(substituted in) 81'
Manager:
Þorsteinn Halldórsson			(yellow card) 34'

Player of the Match:
Géraldine Reuteler (Switzerland)

Assistant referees:
Guadalupe Porras Ayuso (Spain)
Eliana Fernández (Spain)
Fourth official:
Olatz Rivera Olmedo (Spain)
Video assistant referee:
Guillermo Cuadra Fernández (Spain)
Assistant video assistant referee:
Judit Romano García (Spain)

=== Finland vs Switzerland ===
10 July 2025
21:00

Finland	1–1	Switzerland
Kuikka 79' (pen.)	Report	Xhemaili 90+2'

Stade de Genève, Geneva
Attendance: 26,388
Referee: Stéphanie Frappart (France)

Finland	Switzerland

GK	1	Anna Koivunen	(yellow card) 90+1'
RB	6	Joanna Tynnilä
CB	15	Natalia Kuikka
CB	3	Eva Nyström
LB	5	Emma Koivisto
CM	20	Eveliina Summanen		(substituted off) 72'
CM	13	Oona Siren
CM	21	Oona Sevenius		(substituted off) 57'
AM	4	Ria Öling		(substituted off) 57'
AM	9	Katariina Kosola		(substituted off) 82'
CF	18	Linda Sällström (c)		(substituted off) 72'
Substitutions:
MF	8	Olga Ahtinen		(substituted in) 57'
FW	17	Sanni Franssi		(substituted in) 57'
DF	16	Nea Lehtola		(substituted in) 72'
FW	22	Jutta Rantala		(substituted in) 72'
DF	19	Maaria Roth		(substituted in) 82'
Manager:
Marko Saloranta

GK	12	Livia Peng
CB	18	Viola Calligaris
CB	2	Julia Stierli		(substituted off) 82'
CB	5	Noelle Maritz
RWB	19	Iman Beney		(substituted off) 82'
LWB	8	Nadine Riesen		(substituted off) 46'
CM	6	Géraldine Reuteler	(yellow card) 34'
CM	13	Lia Wälti (c)
CM	14	Smilla Vallotto
CF	22	Sydney Schertenleib		(substituted off) 71'
CF	17	Svenja Fölmli		(substituted off) 46'
Substitutions:
DF	9	Ana-Maria Crnogorčević		(substituted in) 46'
FW	3	Leila Wandeler		(substituted in) 46'
FW	20	Alayah Pilgrim		(substituted in) 71'
MF	7	Riola Xhemaili		(substituted in) 82'
FW	23	Alisha Lehmann		(substituted in) 82'
Manager:
(Sweden) Pia Sundhage

Player of the Match:
Géraldine Reuteler (Switzerland)

Assistant referees:
Camille Soriano (France)
Irina Pozdejeva (Lithuania)
Fourth official:
Catarina Campos (Portugal)
Video assistant referee:
Willy Delajod (France)
Assistant video assistant referee:
Christian Dingert (Germany)

=== Norway vs Iceland ===
10 July 2025
21:00

Norway	4–3	Iceland
Gaupset 15', 26'; Maanum 49', 76'	Report	Jónsdóttir 6'; Eiríksdóttir 84'; Viggósdóttir 90+5' (pen.)

Arena Thun, Thun
Attendance: 7,859
Referee: Alina Peșu (Romania)

Norway	Iceland

GK	1	Cecilie Fiskerstrand (c)
RB	3	Emilie Woldvik
CB	6	Maren Mjelde		(substituted off) 79'
CB	16	Mathilde Harviken		(substituted off) 46'
LB	4	Tuva Hansen
CM	8	Vilde Bøe Risa		(substituted off) 46'
CM	18	Frida Maanum
CM	21	Lisa Naalsund
RF	17	Celin Bizet		(substituted off) 73'
CF	19	Elisabeth Terland		(substituted off) 61'
LF	22	Signe Gaupset
Substitutions:
MF	15	Justine Kielland		(substituted in) 46'
DF	2	Marit Bratberg Lund	(yellow card) 64' (yellow-red card) 90+4'	(substituted in) 46'
FW	9	Karina Sævik		(substituted in) 61'
FW	20	Synne Jensen		(substituted in) 73'
DF	5	Marthine Østenstad		(substituted in) 79'
Manager:
(England) Gemma Grainger

GK	1	Cecilía Rán Rúnarsdóttir
RB	18	Guðrún Arnardóttir
CB	4	Glódís Perla Viggósdóttir (c)	(yellow card) 35'
CB	6	Ingibjörg Sigurðardóttir
LB	5	Sædís Rún Heiðarsdóttir
CM	8	Alexandra Jóhannsdóttir		(substituted off) 82'
CM	7	Karólína Lea Vilhjálmsdóttir		(substituted off) 71'
CM	16	Hildur Antonsdóttir		(substituted off) 57'
RF	23	Sveindís Jane Jónsdóttir
CF	3	Sandra Jessen		(substituted off) 71'
LF	15	Katla Tryggvadóttir		(substituted off) 57'
Substitutions:
MF	17	Agla María Albertsdóttir		(substituted in) 57'
MF	10	Dagný Brynjarsdóttir		(substituted in) 57'
MF	22	Amanda Andradóttir		(substituted in) 71'
FW	14	Hlín Eiríksdóttir		(substituted in) 71'
MF	2	Berglind Rós Ágústsdóttir		(substituted in) 82'
Manager:
Þorsteinn Halldórsson

Player of the Match:
Signe Gaupset (Norway)

Assistant referees:
Daniela Constatinescu (Romania)
Svitlana Grushko (Ukraine)
Fourth official:
Hristiana Guteva (Bulgaria)
Video assistant referee:
Katrin Rafalsky (Germany)
Assistant video assistant referee:
Cătălin Popa (Romania)

== Discipline ==
Disciplinary points would have been used as a tiebreaker in the group if teams were tied on overall and head-to-head records, with a lower number of disciplinary points ranking higher. Points were calculated based on yellow and red cards received by players and coaches in all group matches as follows:

- first yellow card: plus 1 point;
- indirect red card (second yellow card): plus 3 points;
- direct red card: plus 3 points;
- yellow card and direct red card: plus 4 points;

Team	Match 1				Match 2				Match 3				Points
Team	Booked	(yellow card) (yellow-red card)	Sent off (straight red)	(yellow card) (red card)	Booked	(yellow card) (yellow-red card)	Sent off (straight red)	(yellow card) (red card)	Booked	(yellow card) (yellow-red card)	Sent off (straight red)	(yellow card) (red card)	Points
Finland	1								1				2
Switzerland	1								1				2
Norway	1									1			4
Iceland		1			4				1				8
