= Glódís Perla Viggósdóttir =

Icelandic footballer (born 1995)

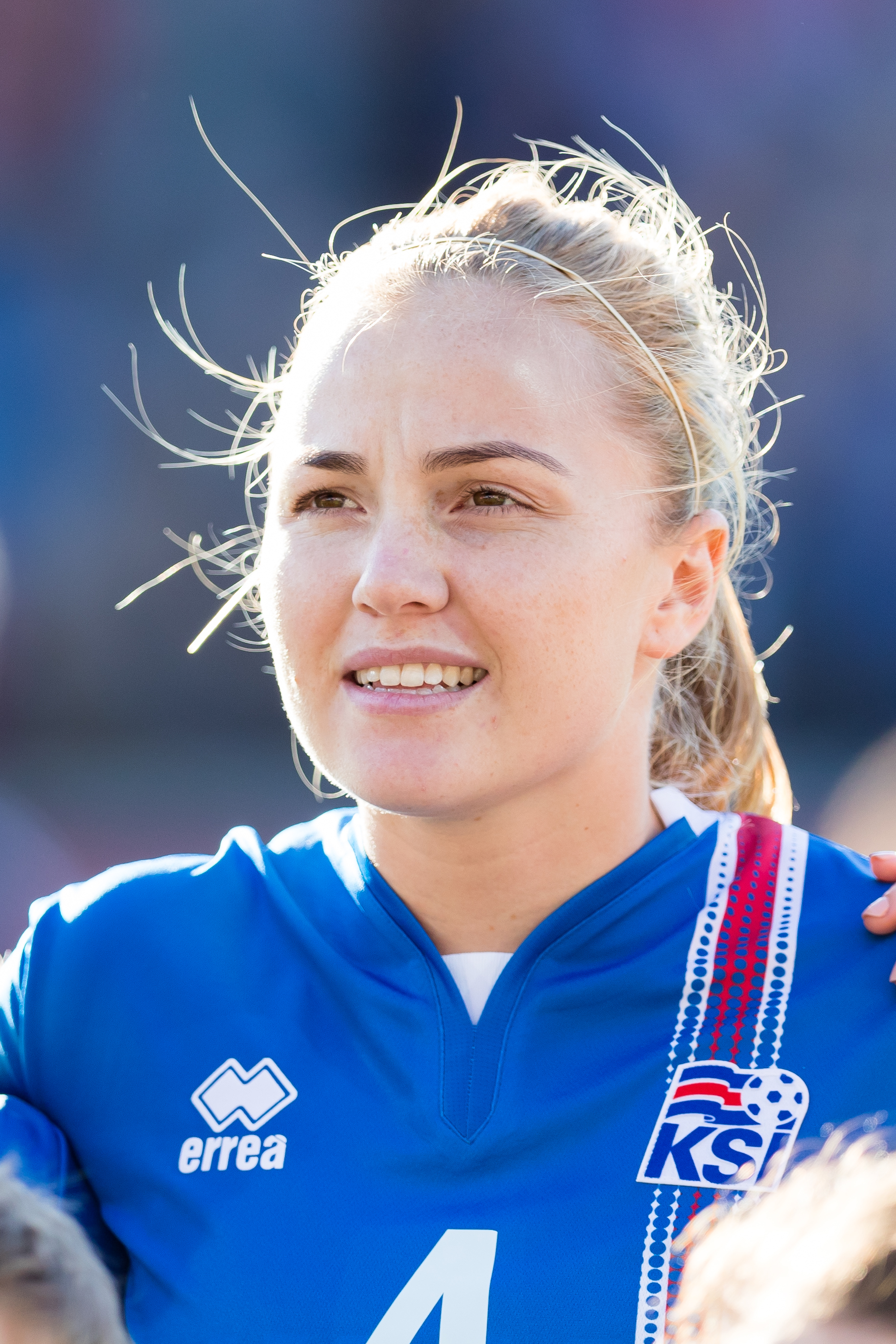
- Glódís Perla with Iceland in 2017

Personal information
- Date of birth: 27 June 1995 (age 31)
- Place of birth: Akureyri, Iceland
- Height: 1.73 m (5 ft 8 in)
- Position: Centre-back

Team information
- Current team: Bayern Munich
- Number: 4

Youth career
- Egebjerg EIF

Senior career*
Years	Team	Apps	(Gls)
2009–2011	HK/Víkingur	17	(14)
2011	Horsens SIK		
2012–2015	Stjarnan	50	(5)
2015–2017	Eskilstuna United DFF	53	(1)
2017–2021	FC Rosengård	89	(10)
2021–	Bayern Munich	110	(10)

International career^{‡}
2009–2012	Iceland U-17	24	(6)
2011–2012	Iceland U-19	9	(0)
2012	Iceland U-23	1	(0)
2012–	Iceland	150	(14)
- * Club domestic league appearances and goals as of 23 October 2026 ‡ National team caps and goals as of 15 October 2026

Glódís Perla Viggósdóttir (born 27 June 1995) is an Icelandic professional footballer who plays as a centre-back for and captains both Frauen-Bundesliga club Bayern Munich and the Iceland national team.

Glódís Perla started her career with HK/Víkingur, Horsens SIK, and Stjarnan. She moved to Sweden in 2015, first playing for Eskilstuna United and then FC Rosengård. With Rosengård, she won one Damallsvenskan title and two Svenska Cupen trophies. She then moved to Bayern Munich, where she has won three consecutive Frauen-Bundesliga titles.

Glódís Perla is a four-time Icelandic Women's Footballer of the Year winner and one-time Icelandic Sportsperson of the Year. Later on in 2024, she became the first Icelandic player to be nominated for the Ballon d'Or Féminin.

== Club career ==
=== HK/Víkingur, Stjarnan ===
Glódís Perla played youth football in Denmark with Egebjerg EIF before moving to her first senior club, HK/Víkingur, in 2009. She was a productive scorer for HK/Víkingur, managing to net 14 goals in 17 league appearances with the team while playing as a striker. She had a short, three-month stint with Horsens SIK in Denmark before heading back to Iceland and joining Stjarnan for the 2012 season. With Stjarnan, Glódís Perla won two Besta deild kvenna titles across four years.

=== Eskilstuna United ===
In November 2014, Glódís Perla signed in Sweden for Damallsvenskan club Eskilstuna United, where she played between 2015 and 2017. After her first season with the club, in which she played every single minute of the campaign, Eskilstuna and Glódís Perla agreed on a one-year contract extension. She later helped contribute to Eskilstuna United's run in the 2016–17 UEFA Women's Champions League, where they reached the Round of 16. She started all 11 matches in 2017 before ultimately departing.

=== FC Rosengård ===
In July 2017, Glódís Perla moved clubs and signed for one of Eskilstuna's competitors, FC Rosengård. She had prior familiarity with the club, having attended Rosengård training camps at ages 16 and 17. With center backs Emma Berglund and Amanda Ilestedt having previously moved on from Rosengård, Glódís Perla was able to cement herself as an important figure in the team. Her play earned her a contract extension in 2018, and she re-signed for two more seasons. In 2019, she helped Rosengård win the Damallsvenskan title.

In 2020, Rosengård finished second overall in the league and secured qualification for the UEFA Women's Champions League. Earlier on in the year, Glódís Perla had helped the team start the season on a good note, scoring the lone goal against Kristianstad to give Rosengård their second win in as many games. An example of consistency, she ended up not missing a single club match for the first three years of her tenure, starting 57 in a row. At the end of 2020, she was nominated for the Damallsvenskan's Defender of the Year award, but the accolade was instead won by Kopparbergs/Goeteborg player Natalia Kuikka. However, Glódís Perla still was able to secure a spot on the Damallsvenskan team of the season, along with five of her teammates. She played her final Rosengård match on 9 July 2021. In her five years at Rosengård, Glódís Perla had appeared for the team in 89 league matches and scored 10 goals.

=== Bayern Munich ===
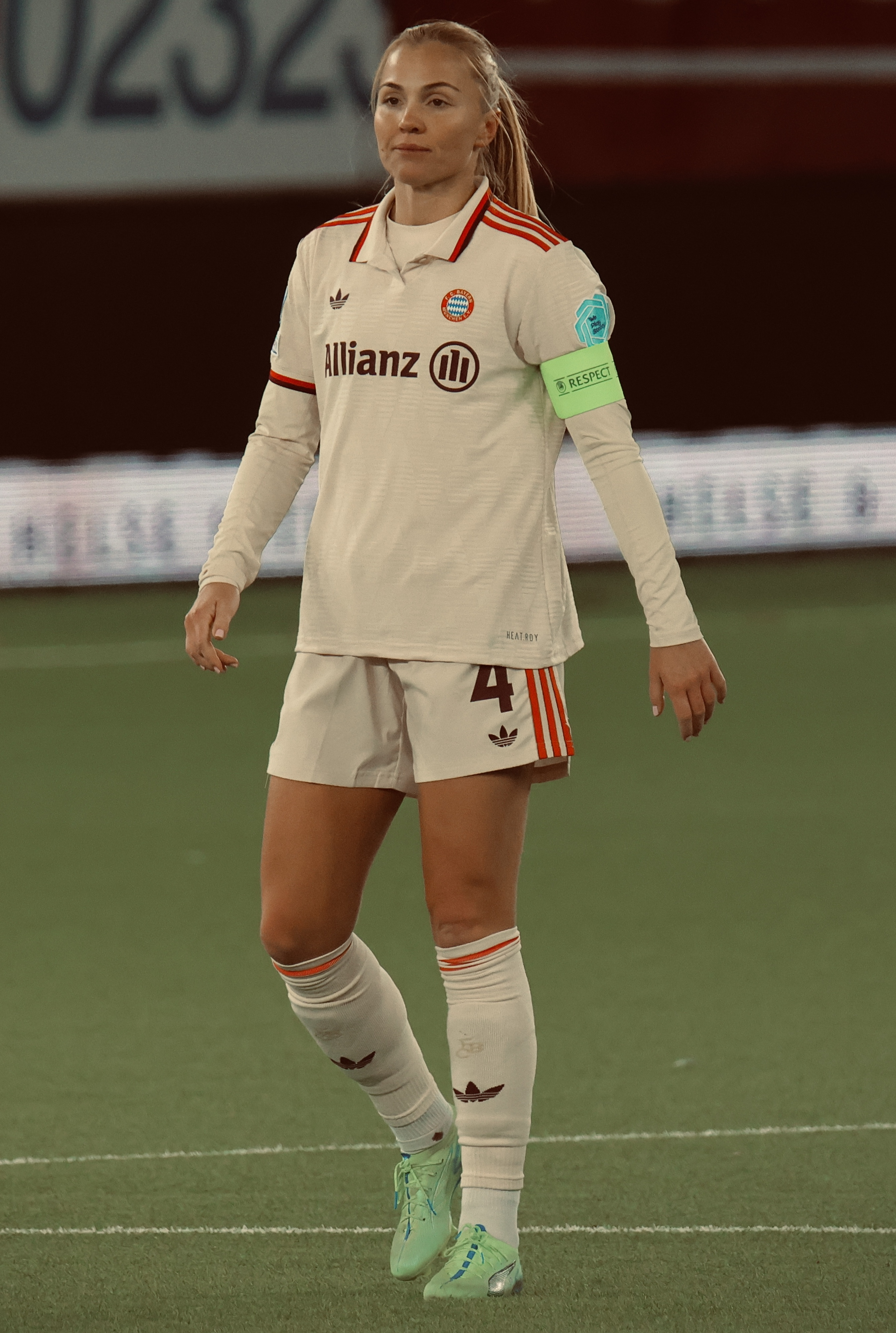
Playing for Bayern München, 2024

In July 2021, Glódís Perla signed with Bayern Munich of the Frauen-Bundesliga, inking a three-year contract in the midst of her sixth professional season. Although she had previously heard negative stories about Bayern, a chat with Icelandic teammate Karólína Lea Vilhjálmsdóttir assuaged her concerns. She made her Bayern debut in the club's season-opener, coming on as a second-half substitute for Sarah Zadrazil in an eventual 8–0 victory over Werder Bremen. On 12 September 2021, she scored her first Frauen-Bundesliga goal in a win over SC Freiburg.

The following season, Bayern Munich hired manager Alexander Straus, whom Glódís Perla has expressed helped her perform better than the year prior. She earned her first trophy at the club by winning the 2022–23 Frauen-Bundesliga, capping off a season in which she played every single minute of Bayern's campaign. Ahead of the 2023–24 season, she was named club captain (a position which had been held for three years prior by Lina Magull) and extended her contract until 2026. In 2023–24, she was a key contributor as Bayern won their second Frauen-Bundesliga in a row. The team repeated the feat in the following season, securing the title in the third-to-last match of the season. During the game, Glódís Perla scored once as Bayern beat Freiburg, 3–1, to ensure that the title would end up in their hands. Once again, she did not miss a single game of the season as Bayern also finished second in the DFB-Pokal.

Glódís Perla led FC Bayern Women to the first double in the club's history in 2024–25 season. In December 2025, her contract was extended until 30 June 2028.

== International career ==
Glódís Perla played for multiple Icelandic youth national teams, one of which she has captained. It was at the under-17 level that she was fully converted into a centre-back after playing as a midfielder and forward for HK/Víkingur.

In July 2012, Glódís Perla received her first call-up to the Icelandic senior national team. On 4 August 2012, she made her senior international debut in Iceland's 1–1 friendly draw with Scotland at Cappielow. She was called up to be part of the national team for the UEFA Women's Euro 2013. Glódís Perla was also a member of Iceland's team in the 2017 Women's Euro. While she expressed excitement and balance among the team leading up to the tournament, Iceland lost their opening match to France in a slim defeat and were beaten in each of their other two fixtures, resulting in their elimination from the group.

On 11 June 2018, she scored her first international brace against Slovenia as part of Iceland's 2019 FIFA Women's World Cup qualification journey. Glódís Perla was included in Iceland's squad for the UEFA Women's Euro 2022. She started in all three matches as Iceland posted three 1–1 draws, staying undefeated but failing to qualify for the knockout stages of the tournament. On 7 April 2022, she played her 100th match for Iceland in a 5–0 win over Belarus in the 2023 FIFA Women's World Cup qualification. At the end of 2022, she was named Iceland's Footballer of the Year, beating teammate Sveindís Jane Jónsdóttir. Glódís Perla would go on to win the award in 2023 and 2024 as well, setting a three-year streak.

In 2024, Glódís Perla received multiple other honors in addition to the Icelandic Footballer of the Year, as she was named the Icelandic Sportsperson of the Year and nominated for the Ballon d'Or Féminin. She became the first Icelandic women's footballer to be nominated for the Ballon d'Or. Despite not winning, she was also the highest-voted centre-back.

In July 2024, Glódís Perla played in a 3–0 win over Germany and executed a key goal-line clearance in the second half. The result, Iceland's first-ever win against the Germans, sealed their spot in the UEFA Women's Euro 2025. When the Euros rolled around the following summer, Glódís Perla was called up to the Iceland squad, marking her fourth Euro tournament since her arrival onto the national team. In the opening game of the competition, a match against Finland, she went down for treatment in the first half of the game before being substituted off during halftime. After the conclusion of the game, which ended as a 1–0 win for Finland, Glódís Perla revealed that her absence was caused by diarrhea.

== Style of play ==
Glódís Perla plays primarily as a centre back for both club and country, although she was a midfielder at the start of her career. She has been described by ESPN's Bill Connelly as a "do-everything defender". As a captain for both Bayern Munich and Iceland, Glódís Perla has been recognized for her leadership qualities. She is also known for her aerial presence, physical strength, capabilities in build-up play, and calmness on the field. Glódís Perla has also been touted for her experience from a young age, having already received 25 international caps at the age of 19.

== Personal life ==
Born in Akureyri, Glódís Perla grew up in Kópavogur. She dabbled in multiple sports as a child, including judo and handball, before focusing on football at age 16. After graduating from the Reykjavík Women's College, she studied at the University of Akureyri. She graduated from Akureyri with a Bachelor of Arts in psychology the day after scoring a brace against Slovenia in a 2019 World Cup qualifier. Glódís Perla is also a certified personal trainer and enjoys playing the guitar in her spare time.

== Career statistics ==
Scores and results list Iceland's goal tally first.

List of international goals scored by Glódís Perla Viggósdóttir
No.	Date	Venue	Opponent	Score	Result	Competition
1	17 September 2014	Laugardalsvöllur, Reykjavík, Iceland	Serbia	2–0	9–1	2015 FIFA Women's World Cup qualification
2	22 October 2015	Petar Miloševski Training Centre, Skopje, North Macedonia	North Macedonia	2–0	4–0	UEFA Women's Euro 2017 qualifying
3	11 June 2018	Laugardalsvöllur, Reykjavík, Iceland	Slovenia	1–0	2–0	2019 FIFA Women's World Cup qualification
4	11 June 2018	Laugardalsvöllur, Reykjavík, Iceland	Slovenia	2–0	2–0	2019 FIFA Women's World Cup qualification
5	4 September 2018	Laugardalsvöllur, Reykjavík, Iceland	Czech Republic	1–1	1–1	2019 FIFA Women's World Cup qualification
6	2 September 2022	Laugardalsvöllur, Reykjavík, Iceland	Belarus	4–0	6–0	2023 FIFA Women's World Cup qualification
7	11 October 2022	Estádio da Mata Real, Paços de Ferreira, Portugal	Portugal	1–1	1–4 (a.e.t.)	2023 FIFA Women's World Cup qualification – UEFA play-offs
8	11 April 2023	Stadion Letzigrund, Zürich, Switzerland	Switzerland	1–0	2–1	Friendly
9	22 September 2023	Laugardalsvöllur, Reykjavík, Iceland	Wales	1–0	1–0	2023–24 UEFA Women's Nations League
10	31 May 2024	Josko Arena, Ried im Innkreis, Austria	Austria	1–1	1–1	UEFA Women's Euro 2025 qualifying
11	10 July 2025	Arena Thun, Thun, Switzerland	Norway	3–4	3–4	UEFA Women's Euro 2025
12	24 October 2025	The Showgrounds, Ballymena, Northern Ireland	Northern Ireland	1–0	2–0	2025 UEFA Women's Nations League play-off matches
13	9 October 2026	Stadion Aldo Drosina, Pula, Croatia	Croatia	2–0	4–0	2027 FIFA Women's World Cup qualification

== Honours ==
Stjarnan

- Icelandic Women's Cup: 2012
- Icelandic Women's Football League Cup: 2013
- Icelandic Women's Super Cup: 2012

FC Rosengård

- Damallsvenskan: 2019
- Svenska Cupen: 2017, 2018

Bayern Munich

- Frauen-Bundesliga: 2022–23, 2023–24, 2024–25, 2025–26
- DFB-Pokal: 2024–25, 2025–26
- DFB-Supercup: 2024 , 2026

Individual

- Icelandic Women's Footballer of the Year: 2022, 2023, 2024, 2025
- Icelandic Sportsperson of the Year: 2024
- Order of the Falcon: 2025
