= 2023 Pinatar Cup =

2023 edition of the Pinatar Cup

Tournament details
- Host country: Spain
- Dates: 15–21 February
- Teams: 4 (from 2 confederations)
- Venue: 1 (in 1 host city)

Final positions
- Champions: Iceland (1st title)
- Runners-up: Wales
- Third place: Scotland
- Fourth place: Philippines

Tournament statistics
- Matches played: 6
- Goals scored: 13 (2.17 per match)
- Top scorer(s): (Iceland) Amanda Andradóttir (Iceland) Ólöf Sigríður Kristinsdóttir (2 goals each)

The 2023 Pinatar Cup was the third edition of the Pinatar Cup, an international women's football tournament. It was held in San Pedro del Pinatar, Spain from 15 to 21 February 2023.

Iceland won the tournament for the first time, while Wales were the runners-up.

== Format ==
The four invited teams played a round-robin tournament. Points awarded in the group stage followed the formula of three points for a win, one point for a draw, and zero points for a loss. A tie in points was decided by goal differential.

== Venue ==
San Pedro del Pinatar
Pinatar Arena
Capacity: 3,000
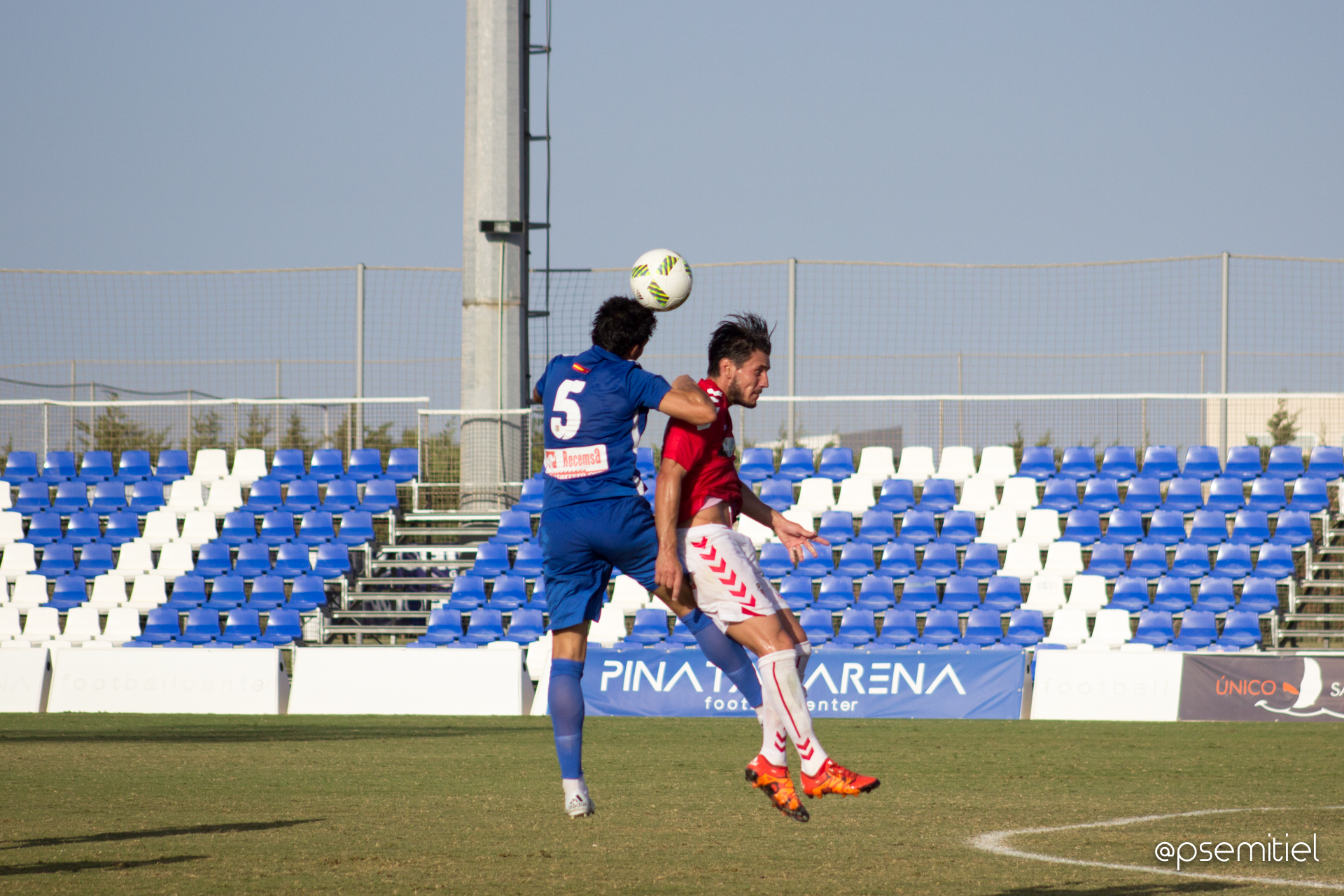

== Teams ==
Team	FIFA Rankings (December 2022)
Iceland	16
Scotland	25
Wales	32
Philippines	53

== Standings ==
Pos	Team	Pld	W	D	L	GF	GA	GD	Pts
1	Iceland (C)	3	2	1	0	7	0	+7	7
2	Wales	3	1	2	0	2	1	+1	5
3	Scotland	3	1	1	1	3	4	−1	4
4	Philippines	3	0	0	3	1	8	−7	0

Source: KSI
Rules for classification: 1) points; 2) goal difference; 3) goals scored; 4) head-to-head points; 5) head-to-head goal difference; 6) head-to-head number of goals scored; 7) FIFA ranking.
(C) Champions

== Results ==
All times are local (UTC+1).

15 February 2023
15:00

Scotland	0–2	Iceland
	Report	Kristinsdóttir 50', 51'

Pinatar Arena, San Pedro del Pinatar
Referee: Zuzana Valentová (Slovakia)
15 February 2023
20:30

Wales	1–0	Philippines
Green 45+1' (pen.)	Report

Pinatar Arena, San Pedro del Pinatar
Referee: Lucie Šulcová (Czech Republic)

18 February 2023
15:00

Philippines	1–2	Scotland
Serrano 90'	Report	Davidson 40'; Corsie 57'

Pinatar Arena, San Pedro del Pinatar
Attendance: 150
Referee: Zuzana Valentová (Slovakia)
18 February 2023
20:30

Wales	0–0	Iceland
	Report

Pinatar Arena, San Pedro del Pinatar
Referee: Lucie Šulcová (Czech Republic)

21 February 2023
15:00

Scotland	1–1	Wales
Howard 8'	Report	Holland 42'

Pinatar Arena, San Pedro del Pinatar
Referee: Lucie Šulcová (Czech Republic)
21 February 2023
20:30

Iceland	5–0	Philippines
Andradóttir 20', 51'; Magnúsdóttir 71'; Eiríksdóttir 80'; Jóhannsdóttir 90+2'	Report

Pinatar Arena, San Pedro del Pinatar
Referee: Zuzana Valentová (Slovakia)

== Goalscorers ==
There were 13 goals scored in 6 matches, for an average of 2.17 goals per match.

2 goals

- (Iceland) Amanda Andradóttir
- (Iceland) Ólöf Sigríður Kristinsdóttir

1 goal

- (Iceland) Hlín Eiríksdóttir
- (Iceland) Alexandra Jóhannsdóttir
- (Iceland) Selma Sól Magnúsdóttir
- (Philippines) Meryll Serrano
- (Scotland) Rachel Corsie
- (Scotland) Lauren Davidson
- (Scotland) Sophie Howard
- (Wales) Kayleigh Green
- (Wales) Ceri Holland
