= Alexandra Jóhannsdóttir =

Icelandic footballer (born 2000)

Personal information
- Date of birth: 19 March 2000 (age 26)
- Place of birth: Iceland
- Height: 1.67 m (5 ft 6 in)
- Position: Midfielder

Team information
- Current team: Kristianstads DFF
- Number: 6

Senior career*
Years	Team	Apps	(Gls)
2017	Haukar	16	(2)
2018–2020	Breiðablik	51	(26)
2021–2022	Eintracht Frankfurt	24	(0)
2022	Breiðablik	7	(3)
2022–2025	Fiorentina	55	(8)
2025–	Kristianstad	3	(1)

International career^{‡}
2015–2017	Iceland U17	17	(5)
2018–2019	Iceland U19	19	(5)
2019–	Iceland	67	(7)
- * Club domestic league appearances and goals as of 18 April 2025 ‡ National team caps and goals as of 15 October 2026 (UTC)

Alexandra Jóhannsdóttir (born 19 March 2000) is an Icelandic professional footballer who plays as a midfielder for Damallsvenskan club Kristianstads DFF and the Iceland national team.

== Early life ==
Alexandra first started playing football in the Haukar academy at the age of six. In May 2019, she graduated from Flensborgarskóli in Hafnarfjörður. Aside from football, she also played handball and practised gymnastics frequently in her youth.

== Career ==
Alexandra has been capped for the Iceland national team. In her time at Breiðablik, she scored 44 goals in 88 games. It was announced, in January 2021, that she had signed for German club Eintracht Frankfurt.

== International career ==
On 13 June 2025, Alexandra was called up to the Iceland squad for the UEFA Women's Euro 2025.

=== International goals ===
Scores and results list the Iceland's goal tally first.

#	Date	Venue	Opponent	Score	Result	Competition
4.	21 February 2023	Pinatar Arena, San Pedro del Pinatar, Spain	Philippines	5–0	5–0	2023 Pinatar Cup
8.	14 April 2026	Laugardalsvöllur, Reykjavík, Iceland	Ukraine	1–0	1–0	2027 FIFA Women's World Cup qualification
