= Signe Gaupset =

Norwegian footballer (born 2005)

- Gaupset in 2026

Personal information
- Date of birth: 18 June 2005 (age 21)
- Height: 1.73 m (5 ft 8 in)
- Position: Midfielder

Team information
- Current team: Tottenham Hotspur
- Number: 8

Youth career
- –2018: Rival
- 2019–2020: Molde

Senior career*
Years	Team	Apps	(Gls)
2021–2025	Brann	85	(26)
2026–	Tottenham Hotspur	13	(4)

International career^{‡}
2021	Norway U16	7	(2)
2022	Norway U17	8	(8)
2022–2023	Norway U19	8	(6)
2025	Norway U23	1	(0)
2024–	Norway	22	(8)
- * Club domestic league appearances and goals as of 07:47, 14 September 2026 (UTC) ‡ National team caps and goals as of 22:30, 14 October 2026 (UTC)

Signe Gaupset (Norwegian: [ˈsɪŋ.nə ˈɡæʉp.sɛt]; born 18 June 2005) is a Norwegian professional footballer who plays as a midfielder for English Women's Super League club Tottenham Hotspur and the Norway national team. Regarded as one of the best young talents in women's football, she is known for her attacking play, technical skill and goalscoring abilities.

== Club career ==
Gaupset hails from Molde Municipality and started her youth career in Rival and went on to the largest club in the city, Molde. At a young age, she trained before school, after school and after dinner. High quantities of training may have contributed to an injury which made her miss half the 2023 season.

Gaupset joined IL Sandviken in 2021, some time before her 16th birthday, and remained in the club when it was rebranded as SK Brann Kvinner in 2022. Gaupset made her national breakthrough in the 2022 Norwegian Women's Cup final, where she scored the two goals that put Brann ahead 3–1 to Stabæk.

She then made her international breakthrough during the 2023–24 UEFA Women's Champions League group stage. First, she was praised as "a sensation" during Brann's loss to Lyon. One week later, in the reverse match against Lyon, Gaupset scored the equalizing goal in extra time. Lastly, against Slavia Prague one of her crosses was converted to an own goal; with this being the only goal in the match, Brann progressed to the next round.

On 21 November 2025, it was announced that Gaupset would join Tottenham Hotspur on 1 January 2026. She scored her first goal for Tottenham in a 7–3 win over Aston Villa on 15 February 2026, also providing an assist for the goal scored by Maika Hamano in the match.

== International career ==
She became a prolific goalscorer for youth international teams. Her scoring Norway's only goal at the 2022 UEFA Women's Under-17 Championship did not prevent Norway from being eliminated.

In February 2024, Gaupset was called up to Norway's senior team in Gemma Grainger's first squad as national team manager. She made her debut as a substitute against Croatia.

On 16 June 2025, Gaupset was called up to the Norway squad for the UEFA Women's Euro 2025.

== Career statistics ==
=== Club ===
As of match played 13 September 2026

Appearances and goals by club, season and competition
Club	Season	League			National cup (Note: Includes Norwegian Women's Cup, Women's FA Cup)		League cup (Note: Includes Women's League Cup)		Continental		Total	
Club	Season	Division	Apps	Goals	Apps	Goals	Apps	Goals	Apps	Goals	Apps	Goals
Brann	2021	Toppserien	5	1	4	1	—		—		9	2
Brann	2022	Toppserien	19	3	3	3	—		—		22	6
Brann	2023	Toppserien	8	0	1	1	—		4 (Note: Appearance(s) in UEFA Women's Champions League)	0	13	1
Brann	2024	Toppserien	27	7	2	0	—		9	1	38	8
Brann	2025	Toppserien	26	15	2	1	—		6 (Note: Four appearances, one goal in UEFA Women's Champions League; two appearances in UEFA Women's Europa Cup)	1	34	17
Brann	Total		85	26	12	6	0	0	19	2	116	34
Tottenham Hotspur	2025–26	Women's Super League	11	3	3	0	0	0	—		14	3
Tottenham Hotspur	2026–27	Women's Super League	2	1	0	0	0	0	—		2	1
Tottenham Hotspur	Total		13	4	3	0	0	0	0	0	16	4
Career total			98	30	15	6	0	0	19	2	132	38

=== International ===
As of match played 13 October 2026

Appearances and goals by national team and year
National team	Year	Apps	Goals
Norway	2024	4	0
Norway	2025	10	7
Norway	2026	8	2
Total		22	8

Scores and results list Norway's goal tally first, score column indicates score after each Gaupset goal.

List of international goals scored by Signe Gaupset
No.	Date	Venue	Opponent	Score	Result	Competition
1	29 October 2024	Ullevaal Stadion, Oslo, Norway	Albania	7–0	9–0	UEFA Women's Euro 2025 qualifying play-offs
2	10 July 2025	Arena Thun, Thun, Switzerland	Iceland	1–1	4–3	UEFA Women's Euro 2025
3	10 July 2025	Arena Thun, Thun, Switzerland	Iceland	2–1	4–3	UEFA Women's Euro 2025
4	28 October 2025	Estadio Municipal de La Línea, La Línea, Spain	Japan	1–0	2–0	Friendly
5	28 October 2025	Estadio Municipal de La Línea, La Línea, Spain	Japan	2–0	2–0	Friendly
6	28 November 2025	Estadio Municipal de La Línea, La Línea, Spain	Brazil	1–0	3–1	Friendly
7	28 November 2025	Estadio Municipal de La Línea, La Línea, Spain	Brazil	2–1	3–1	Friendly
8	18 April 2026	Ptuj City Stadium, Ptuj, Slovenia	Slovenia	3–2	3–2	2027 FIFA Women's World Cup qualification

== Honours ==
Brann

- Toppserien: 2022, 2025
- Norwegian Women's Cup: 2022
