= Sveindís Jane Jónsdóttir =

Icelandic footballer (born 2001)

Sveindís Jónsdóttir
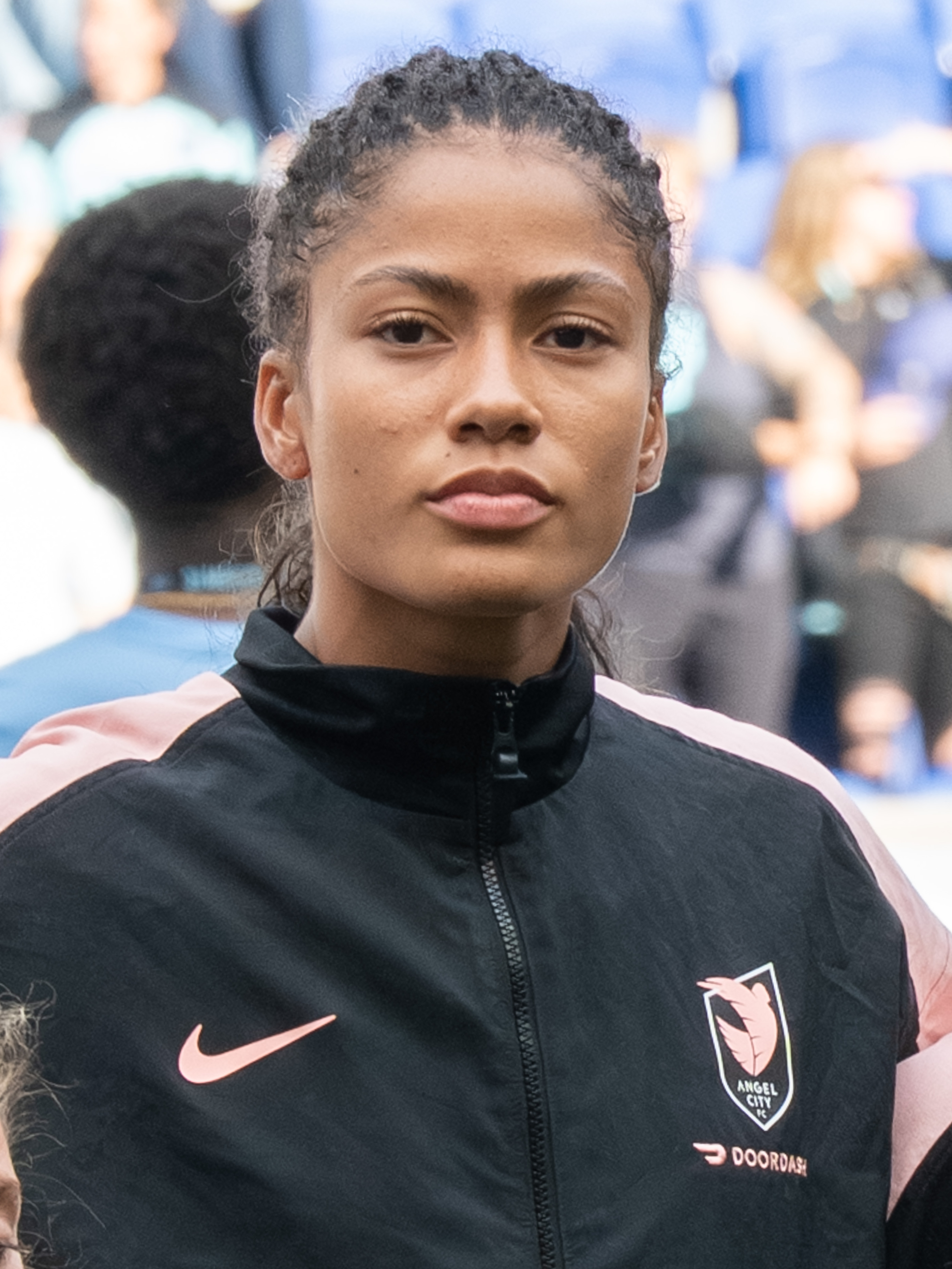
- Sveindís Jane with Angel City FC in 2025

Personal information
- Full name: Sveindís Jane Jónsdóttir
- Date of birth: 5 June 2001 (age 25)
- Place of birth: Keflavík, Iceland
- Height: 1.76 m (5 ft 9 in)
- Position: Forward

Team information
- Current team: Angel City FC
- Number: 32

Youth career
- Keflavík

Senior career*
Years	Team	Apps	(Gls)
2015–2020	Keflavík	75	(49)
2020	→ Breiðablik (loan)	15	(14)
2021–2025	VfL Wolfsburg	58	(12)
2021	→ Kristianstads DFF (loan)	19	(6)
2025–	Angel City FC	36	(11)

International career^{‡}
2016–2017	Iceland U16	10	(6)
2016–2018	Iceland U17	12	(5)
2016–2020	Iceland U19	19	(13)
2020–	Iceland	62	(16)
- * Club domestic league appearances and goals as of 06:00, 12 November 2026 (UTC) ‡ National team caps and goals as of 15 October 2026

Sveindís Jane Jónsdóttir (born 5 June 2001) is an Icelandic professional footballer who plays as a forward for National Women's Soccer League club Angel City FC and the Iceland national team.

In 2020, she won the Icelandic championship with Breiðablik, while also being named the Úrvalsdeild Player of the Year and winning the Úrvalsdeild Golden Boot award. In 2021, she was named the Icelandic Women's Footballer of the Year and in 2022, she won the Frauen-Bundesliga with VfL Wolfsburg.

== Club career ==
=== Keflavík ===
Sveindís Jane Jónsdóttir with Angel City FC in 2026

Sveindís debuted with Keflavík's first team in 2015. During the 2016 season, she scored 27 goals in 19 games in the 1. deild kvenna. In 2018, she helped Keflavík to a second-place finish in the 1. deild and promotion to the top-tier Úrvalsdeild kvenna after scoring 9 goals in 18 matches.

In December 2019, Sveindís was loaned to Breiðablik. She helped Breiðablik finish first in the Úrvalsdeild in 2020 and was named the Player of the Year as well as winning the Golden Boot award after leading the league with 14 goals, same as teammate Agla María Albertsdóttir but in fewer minutes.

=== VfL Wolfsburg ===
In December 2020, Sveindís signed with VfL Wolfsburg. She was immediately loaned to Kristianstads DFF to gain experience. On 18 April 2021, she scored after 11 minutes in her first match with Kristianstads in the Damallsvenskan. In her second match, she scored one goal and assisted on another in Kristianstads' 2–1 win against Djurgården. On 30 April she injured her knee in a game against Växjö DFF after her foot got stuck in the hybrid grass and was carried from the pitch on a stretcher. She was later ruled out for at least 6 weeks. On 5 May it was announced that she had been named the Damallsvenskan Player of the Month for March. In December 2021, she was named the Icelandic Women's Footballer of the Year.

On 29 January 2022, Sveindís debuted in the Frauen-Bundesliga. In her first start, on 11 March 2022, she scored two goals in a 5–1 victory against 1. FC Köln. In May 2022, she won the Bundesliga with Wolfsburg.

On 11 December 2024, she became the first Icelander to score 4 goals in a single UEFA Women's Champions League match. She scored the goals in a 25-minute span after coming in as a substitute in Wolfsburg's 6–1 win against AS Roma.

=== Angel City ===
On 21 May 2025, it was announced by Angel City FC of the National Women's Soccer League that the club had signed Sveindís through 2027. She made her NWSL debut on 1 August 2025, starting in a 2–0 loss to Seattle Reign FC. Sveindís provided her first assist for Angel City in the following match on August 9, 2025, teeing-up the stoppage-time equalizer scored by teammate Alanna Kennedy in a 1–1 draw against San Diego Wave FC. On 13 September, she scored her first NWSL goal against the North Carolina Courage.

Sveindís got off to a quick start in her second season with Angel City, racking up 3 goals and 2 assists in Angel City's opening slate of matches in 2026 and earning her first NWSL Team of the Month award.

== International career ==
Sveindís was selected to the Icelandic national team for the first time ahead of its game against Latvia on 17 September 2020. She started the match and scored Iceland's second goal on 8 minute. She later added another goal on 32 minute in Iceland's 9–0 victory. On 23 September she set up Iceland's goal in a 1–1 tie against Sweden. Sveindís made her 50th appearance for Iceland on June 3, 2025, in a UEFA Women's Nations League match against France.

On 13 June 2025, Sveindís was called up to the Iceland squad for the UEFA Women's Euro 2025.

== Personal life ==
Sveindís was born in Keflavík, Iceland, to an Icelandic father and a Ghanaian mother and raised in Keflavík. Her uncle Þorsteinn Bjarnason was a footballer who represented Iceland as a goalkeeper.

Sveindís is in a relationship with Colorado Rapids defender Rob Holding, since at least late 2024.

== Career statistics ==
=== International ===
As of match played 13 October 2026

Appearances and goals by national team and year
National team	Year	Apps	Goals
Iceland	2020	5	2
Iceland	2021	8	4
Iceland	2022	12	1
Iceland	2023	7	1
Iceland	2024	12	4
Iceland	2025	12	4
Iceland	2026	6	0
Total		62	16

Scores and results list Iceland's goal tally first, score column indicates score after each Sveindís Jane goal.

List of international goals scored by Sveindís Jane Jónsdóttir
No.	Date	Venue	Opponent	Score	Result	Competition
1	17 September 2020	Laugardalsvöllur, Reykjavík, Iceland	Latvia	2–0	9–0	UEFA Women's Euro 2021 qualifying
2	17 September 2020	Laugardalsvöllur, Reykjavík, Iceland	Latvia	5–0	9–0	UEFA Women's Euro 2021 qualifying
3	26 October 2021	Laugardalsvöllur, Reykjavík, Iceland	Cyprus	2–0	5–0	2023 FIFA Women's World Cup qualification
4	26 October 2021	Laugardalsvöllur, Reykjavík, Iceland	Cyprus	4–0	5–0	2023 FIFA Women's World Cup qualification
5	25 November 2021	Yanmar Stadium, Almere, Netherlands	Japan	1–0	2–0	Friendly
6	30 November 2021	AEK Arena, Larnaca, Cyprus	Cyprus	3–0	4–0	2023 FIFA Women's World Cup qualification
7	29 June 2022	Stadion Dyskobolii Grodzisk Wielkopolski, Grodzisk Wielkopolski, Poland	Poland	2–0	3–1	Friendly
8	11 April 2023	Stadion Letzigrund, Zürich, Switzerland	Switzerland	2–1	2–1	Friendly
9	27 February 2024	Kópavogsvöllur, Kópavogur, Iceland	Serbia	1–1	2–1	2023–24 UEFA Women's Nations League play-off matches
10	5 April 2024	Kópavogsvöllur, Kópavogur, Iceland	Poland	3–0	3–0	UEFA Women's Euro 2025 qualifying
11	12 July 2024	Laugardalsvöllur, Reykjavík, Iceland	Germany	3–0	3–0	UEFA Women's Euro 2025 qualifying
12	16 July 2024	Zagłębiowski Park Sportowy, Sosnowiec, Poland	Poland	1–0	1–0	UEFA Women's Euro 2025 qualifying
13	30 May 2025	Lerkendal Stadion, Trondheim, Norway	Norway	1–0	1–1	2025 UEFA Women's Nations League
14	27 June 2025	Serbian FA Sports Center, Stara Pazova, Serbia	Serbia	3–0	3–1	Friendly
15	10 July 2025	Arena Thun, Thun, Switzerland	Norway	1–0	3–4	UEFA Women's Euro 2025
16	29 October 2025	Valbjarnarvöllur, Reykjavík, Iceland	Northern Ireland	1–0	3–0	2025 UEFA Women's Nations League play-off matches

== Honours ==
Breiðablik

- Icelandic Champion: 2020

VfL Wolfsburg

- Frauen-Bundesliga: 2022
- DFB-Pokal Frauen: 2022–23, 2023–24

Individual

- Úrvalsdeild Player of the Year: 2020
- Úrvalsdeild Golden Boot: 2020
- Icelandic Women's Footballer of the Year: 2021
- NWSL Team of the Month: March 2026
- NWSL Best XI Second Team: 2026
