= Amanda Andradóttir =

Icelandic footballer (born 2003)

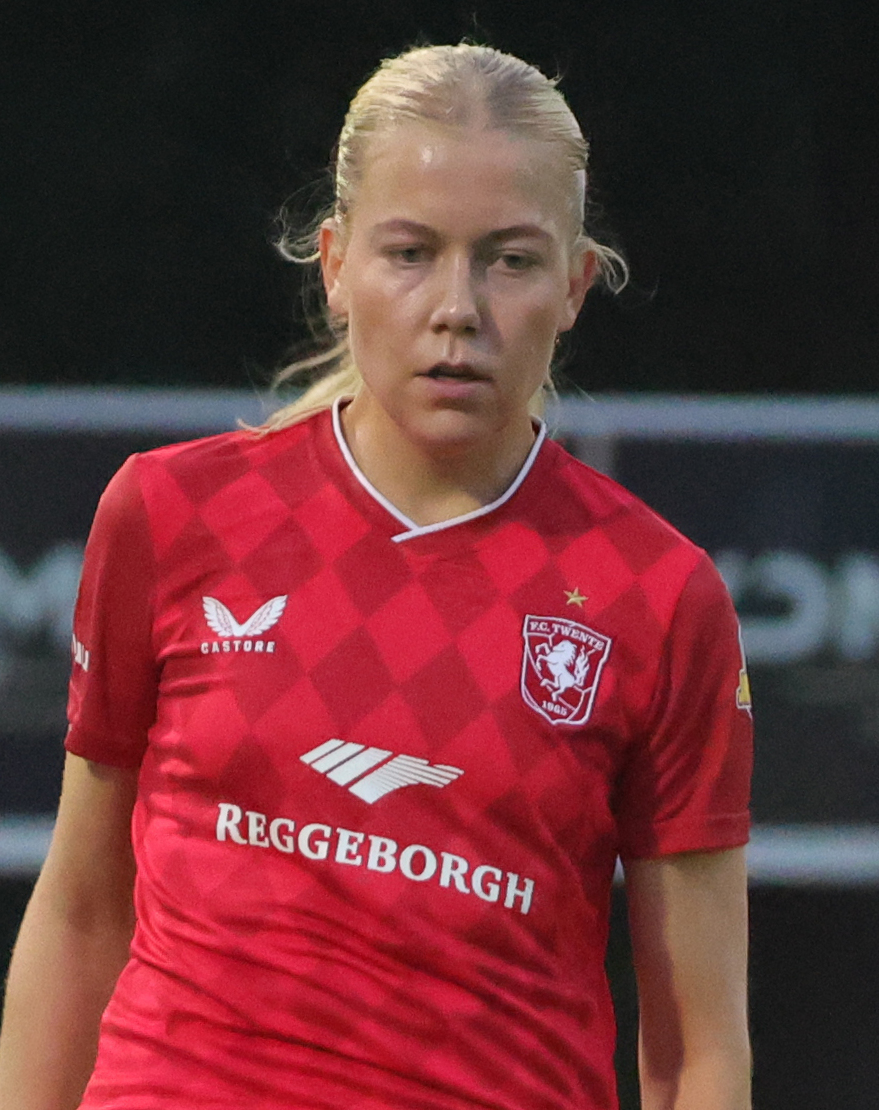
- Amanda with FC Twente in 2025

Personal information
- Full name: Amanda Jacobsen Andradóttir
- Date of birth: 18 December 2003 (age 22)
- Place of birth: Molde, Norway
- Height: 1.76 m (5 ft 9 in)
- Position: Midfielder

Team information
- Current team: FC Twente
- Number: 17

Youth career
- 2014: Víkingur
- 2014–2019: Valur
- 2019–2020: Fortuna Hjørring

Senior career*
Years	Team	Apps	(Gls)
2020–2021	Nordsjælland	8	(1)
2021	Vålerenga	15	(4)
2022–2023	Kristianstads DFF	40	(3)
2023–2024	Valur	20	(11)
2024–	FC Twente	7	(1)

International career^{‡}
2019	Iceland U-17	3	(1)
2021–	Iceland	20	(2)
- * Club domestic league appearances and goals as of 14:56, 15 January 2025 (UTC) ‡ National team caps and goals as of 09:46, 22 February 2023 (UTC)

Amanda Jacobsen Andradóttir (born 18 December 2003) is an Icelandic footballer who plays as a midfielder for FC Twente and the Iceland national team.

== Career ==
On 4 August 2020, Amanda was announced at Nordsjælland.

On 21 December 2020, Amanda was announced at Vålerenga.

On 15 December 2021, Amanda was announced at Kristianstads DFF.

On 13 July 2023, Amanda was announced at Valur.

On 15 July 2024, Amanda was announced at FC Twente on a two-year contract. She made her league debut against Fortuna Sittard on 29 September 2024. Amanda scored her first league goal against SC Heerenveen on 7 December 2024, scoring in the 51st minute.

== International career ==
Amanda has dual Norwegian nationality and was called up to Norway's under-19 team at one point.

Amanda made her debut for the Iceland national team on 21 September 2021, coming on as a substitute for Gunnhildur Yrsa Jónsdóttir in the match against the Netherlands.

On 11 June 2022, Amanda was called up to the Iceland squad for the UEFA Women's Euro 2022.

On 3 February 2023, Amanda was called up to the Iceland squad for the 2023 Pinatar Cup. She scored her first international goals in the 2023 Pinatar Cup final against Philippines on 21 February 2023, scoring a brace. This helped Iceland win the Pinatar Cup for the first time in their history.

On 13 June 2025, Amanda was called up to the Iceland squad for the UEFA Women's Euro 2025.

=== International goals ===
Scores and results list the Iceland's goal tally first.

#	Date	Venue	Opponent	Score	Result	Competition
1.	February 21, 2023	Pinatar Arena, San Pedro del Pinatar, Spain	Philippines	1–0	5–0	2023 Pinatar Cup
2.	February 21, 2023	Pinatar Arena, San Pedro del Pinatar, Spain	Philippines	2–0	5–0	2023 Pinatar Cup

== Personal life ==
Amanda's father Andri Sigþórsson was a professional footballer who represented Iceland at international level.
