= Guðný Árnadóttir =

Icelandic footballer (born 2000)

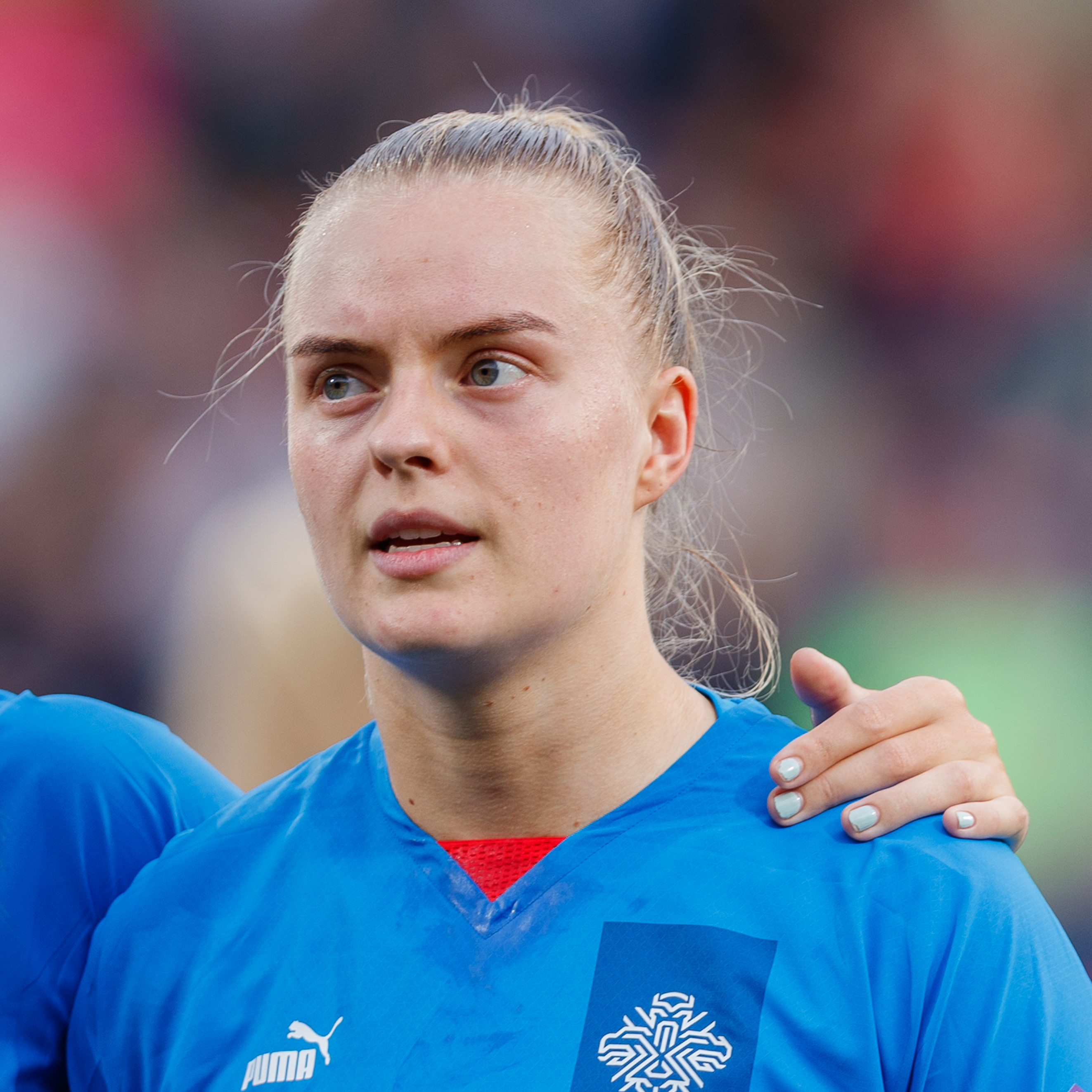
- Guðný with Iceland in 2023

Personal information
- Date of birth: 4 August 2000 (age 26)
- Place of birth: Iceland
- Position: Right back

Team information
- Current team: Kristianstads DFF

Senior career*
Years	Team	Apps	(Gls)
2015–2018	FH	64	(8)
2019–2020	Valur	34	(0)
2020–2024	AC Milan	45	(1)
2020–2021	→ Napoli (loan)	12	(0)
2024–	Kristianstads DFF	11	(0)

International career^{‡}
2016	Iceland U16	7	(0)
2015–2017	Iceland U17	16	(0)
2016–2019	Iceland U19	17	(1)
2018–	Iceland	30	(0)
- * Club domestic league appearances and goals as of 24 July 2023 ‡ National team caps and goals as of 27 March 2022

Guðný Árnadóttir (born 4 August 2000) is an Icelandic professional footballer who plays as a left back for Kristianstads DFF and the Iceland women's national team. In 2019, she won the Icelandic championship with Valur.

== International career ==
On 13 June 2025, Guðný was called up to the Iceland squad for the UEFA Women's Euro 2025.
