= Hlín Eiríksdóttir =

Icelandic footballer

- Eiríksdóttir in 2023

Personal information
- Date of birth: 12 June 2000 (age 26)
- Place of birth: Iceland
- Height: 1.67 m (5 ft 6 in)
- Positions: Midfielder; winger

Team information
- Current team: Malmö FF

Senior career*
Years	Team	Apps	(Gls)
2015–2020	Valur	80	(33)
2021–2022	Piteå IF	39	(10)
2023–2025	Kristianstads	29	(11)
2025–2026	Leicester City	1	(0)
2026	→ ACF Fiorentina (loan)	10	(0)
2026–	Malmö FF	0	(0)

International career^{‡}
2015–2017	Iceland U17	28	(15)
2016–2019	Iceland U19	17	(8)
2018–	Iceland	62	(10)
- * Club domestic league appearances and goals as of 9 February 2025 ‡ National team caps and goals as of 15 October 2026

Hlín Eiríksdóttir (Icelandic: [l̥iːn ˈeiːriksˌtouhtɪr̥]; born 12 June 2000) is an Icelandic professional footballer who plays as a midfielder for Damallsvenskan side Malmö FF, and the Iceland national team.

== Career ==
=== Club ===
Hlín made her Úrvalsdeild debut with Valur in 2015. She played her first game on 1 September 2015, when she replaced Berglind Rós Ágústsdóttir in the 64th minute in a 0–4 defeat against Þór/KA. It would be her only appearance that summer. Hlín's first goal for her senior side came against Breiðablik on 10 August 2017, in a 2–0 win at home.

In December 2020, Hlín signed with Piteå IF of the Swedish top-tier Damallsvenskan. In November 2022, it was reported that she would not play for the team the following season.

On 30 January 2025, Hlín signed for Women's Super League side Leicester City for an undisclosed fee.

On 27 January 2026, it was announced that Hlín had been loaned to Serie A club ACF Fiorentina for the duration of the 2025–26 season.

On 2 July 2026, it was announced that Hlín has signed with Swedish Club Malmö FF and will wear the number 9 for the club.

== International career ==
Hlín debuted for Iceland U17 on 23 April 2015, at 14 years old in a match against Wales. She participated in all the six matches Iceland U17 played in the 2017 UEFA Women's Under-17 Championship qualification. On 25 August 2016, Hlín debuted for Iceland U19 in a match against Poland. On 23 January 2018, Hlín made her first appearance for Iceland senior team in a friendly match against Norway. Hlín scored her first international goal against Denmark in the 2018 Algarve Cup.

On 13 June 2025, Hlín was called up to the Iceland squad for the UEFA Women's Euro 2025.

=== International goals ===
Scores and results list the Iceland's goal tally first.

#	Date	Venue	Opponent	Score	Result	Competition
1.	2 March 2018	Bela Vista Municipal Stadium, Parchal, Portugal	Japan	1–1	1–2	2018 Algarve Cup
2.	7 March 2018	VRS António Sports Complex, Vila Real de Santo António, Portugal	Denmark	1–1	1–1 (5–4 p)	2018 Algarve Cup
3.	29 August 2019	Laugardalsvöllur, Reykjavík, Iceland	Hungary	2–1	4–1	UEFA Women's Euro 2022 qualifying
4.	21 February 2023	Pinatar Arena, San Pedro del Pinatar, Spain	Philippines	4–0	5–0	2023 Pinatar Cup
5.	23 February 2024	Serbian FA Sports Center, Stara Pazova, Serbia	Serbia	1–1	1–1	2023–24 UEFA Women's Nations League play-offs
6.	9 April 2024	New Tivoli, Aachen, Germany	Germany	1–1	1–3	UEFA Women's Euro 2025 qualifying
7.	4 June 2024	Laugardalsvöllur, Reykjavík, Iceland	Austria	1–0	2–1	UEFA Women's Euro 2025 qualifying
8.	10 July 2025	Arena Thun, Thun, Switzerland	Norway	2–4	3–4	UEFA Women's Euro 2025
9.	29 October 2025	Valbjarnarvöllur, Reykjavík, Iceland	Northern Ireland	2–0	3–0	2025 UEFA Women's Nations League play-off matches
10.	9 October 2026	Stadion Aldo Drosina, Pula, Croatia	Croatia	3–0	4–0	2027 FIFA Women's World Cup qualification
11.	13 October 2026	Laugardalsvöllur, Reykjavík, Iceland	Croatia	1–0	5–0	2027 FIFA Women's World Cup qualification

== Personal life ==
Hlín's mother is former Iceland national team player Guðrún Sæmundsdóttir.
