= Gemma Grainger =

English football manager

Personal information
- Full name: Gemma Grainger
- Date of birth: 17 July 1982 (age 44)
- Place of birth: Middlesbrough, England

Team information
- Current team: Norway (manager)

Managerial career
- Years: Team
- 2010–2011: Leeds United
- 2012–2013: Middlesbrough
- 2013–2021: England (youth and senior)
- 2021–2024: Wales
- 2024–: Norway

Gemma Grainger (born 17 July 1982) is an English football manager and current head coach of the Norway women's national football team. At the UEFA Women's Euro 2025, she became the first English manager — male or female — whose teams won all three group matches at a debut European Championship. Under her leadership, Norway recorded their best tournament start since 1998 and reached the knockout stage for the first time since 2013.

Previously, Grainger managed the Wales women's national football team (2021–2024), guiding them to their first World Cup play-off. Earlier in her career, she coached across several England women's development teams, working at two World Cups and four UEFA youth finals, and she holds a UEFA Pro Licence.

== Managerial career ==
=== Early club career ===
Grainger began her managerial career in 2010 with Leeds United, competing in the FA Women's Premier League. She took charge during a transitional period for the club, and left in 2011.

She subsequently managed Middlesbrough during the 2012–13 Northern Combination season, guiding the team to a top-four finish and helping to professionalise structures within the club. During this time, she also began coaching for Middlesbrough Football in the Community, where she worked with youth players across Teesside.

=== England ===
A UEFA Pro Licence holder since 2016, Grainger spent more than a decade working for The Football Association, coaching across England’s women's development pathway. Between 2010 and 2021, she managed at under-17, under-19, and under-20 level, taking England to four UEFA European finals and two FIFA U-20 World Cups.

She was also part of the England senior coaching staff for UEFA Women’s Euro 2017, supporting head coach Mark Sampson and later Phil Neville's backroom team during subsequent international camps.

During her time with the FA, Grainger was recognised for developing players who went on to senior international success, including Beth Mead, Georgia Stanway, and Ella Toone. FA Director Sue Campbell, Baroness Campbell of Loughborough said her work "showed how vital the Lionesses' pathway is in developing coaches and building the talent pool for the future".

=== Wales ===
Grainger was appointed Wales head coach in March 2021 on a four-year contract. Her tenure was marked by progress in performance and professionalism, with the team reaching their first World Cup play-off and recording their highest FIFA ranking to date during her time in charge.

Under her leadership, Wales earned victories over Bosnia and Herzegovina and Kazakhstan, and drew record crowds at Cardiff City Stadium, reflecting growing national support. Grainger was praised for fostering a "clear process and culture of growth", according to captain Angharad James-Turner, while Jess Fishlock credited her with taking the team "to another level".

Grainger left her role with Wales in January 2024 to become manager of Norway, with FAW officials describing her time in charge as "transformative for the women's programme".

=== Norway ===
On 10 January 2024, Grainger was appointed head coach of the Norway women’s national team, succeeding Hege Riise.

In her first major international tournament in charge, the UEFA Women’s Euro 2025, Grainger guided Norway to three wins from three group-stage matches. The achievement made her the first English manager — male or female — whose teams won all three group-stage games on their debut at a European Championship.

Norway finished top of Group B, ahead of Finland, Iceland and hosts Switzerland, before being narrowly defeated by Italy in the quarter-finals. The campaign marked a step forward for Norway, combining renewed belief with results, and was described in Norwegian media as a "successful rebuild built on structure and calm leadership".

Grainger's side also set a new team scoring record for Norway at a European Championship, netting seven goals across the group stage, while maintaining an unbeaten record until the quarter-final stage.

== Managerial statistics ==
As of 9 June 2026

Managerial record by team and tenure
Team	From	To	Record							
Team	From	To	P	W	D	L	GF	GA	GD	Win %
Wales	19 March 2021	10 January 2024	32	10	9	13	39	35	+4	31.25
Norway	10 January 2024	Present	32	18	7	7	65	28	+37	56.25
Career totals			64	28	16	20	104	63	+41	43.75
