= Katariina Kosola =

Finnish footballer (born 2001)

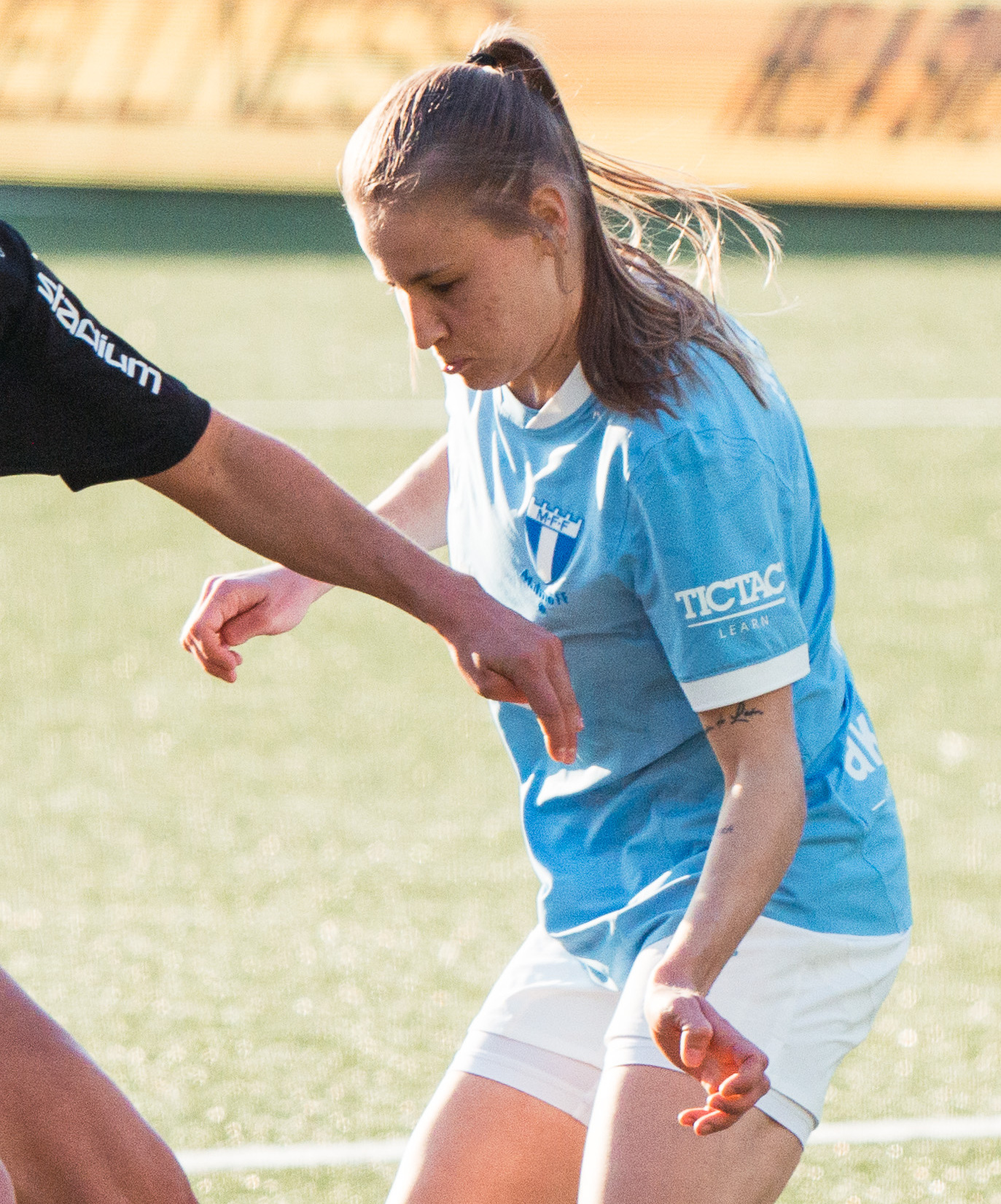
- Kosola with Malmö FF in 2025

Personal information
- Full name: Saara Katariina Kosola
- Date of birth: 24 February 2001 (age 25)
- Place of birth: Hämeenlinna, Finland
- Height: 1.62 m (5 ft 4 in)
- Positions: Midfielder; wing-back

Team information
- Current team: Vålerenga

Youth career
- 2008–2018: HJS
- 2018: Ilves
- 2018: Hämeenlinnan Härmä
- 2019: HFA-Märsky

Senior career*
Years	Team	Apps	(Gls)
2018	Hämeenlinnan Härmä	6	(9)
2020–2021	HJK	41	(9)
2022	Umeå IK	24	(2)
2023	KIF Örebro	17	(0)
2023–2024	BK Häcken	13	(1)
2025–2026	Malmö FF	29	(2)
2026–	Vålerenga	0	(0)

International career^{‡}
2018	Finland U17	1	(0)
2019	Finland U18	2	(0)
2019	Finland U19	1	(0)
2021–2022	Finland U23	4	(0)
2023–	Finland	36	(5)
- * Club domestic league appearances and goals as of 3 July 2025 ‡ National team caps and goals as of 15 October 2026

Saara Katariina Kosola (Finnish: ['sɑːrɑ 'kɑtɑriːnɑ 'kosolɑ] born 24 February 2001) is a Finnish professional footballer who plays as a wing-back for Toppserien club Vålerenga and the Finland national team. She is seen as one of the rising stars of the Finland national team.

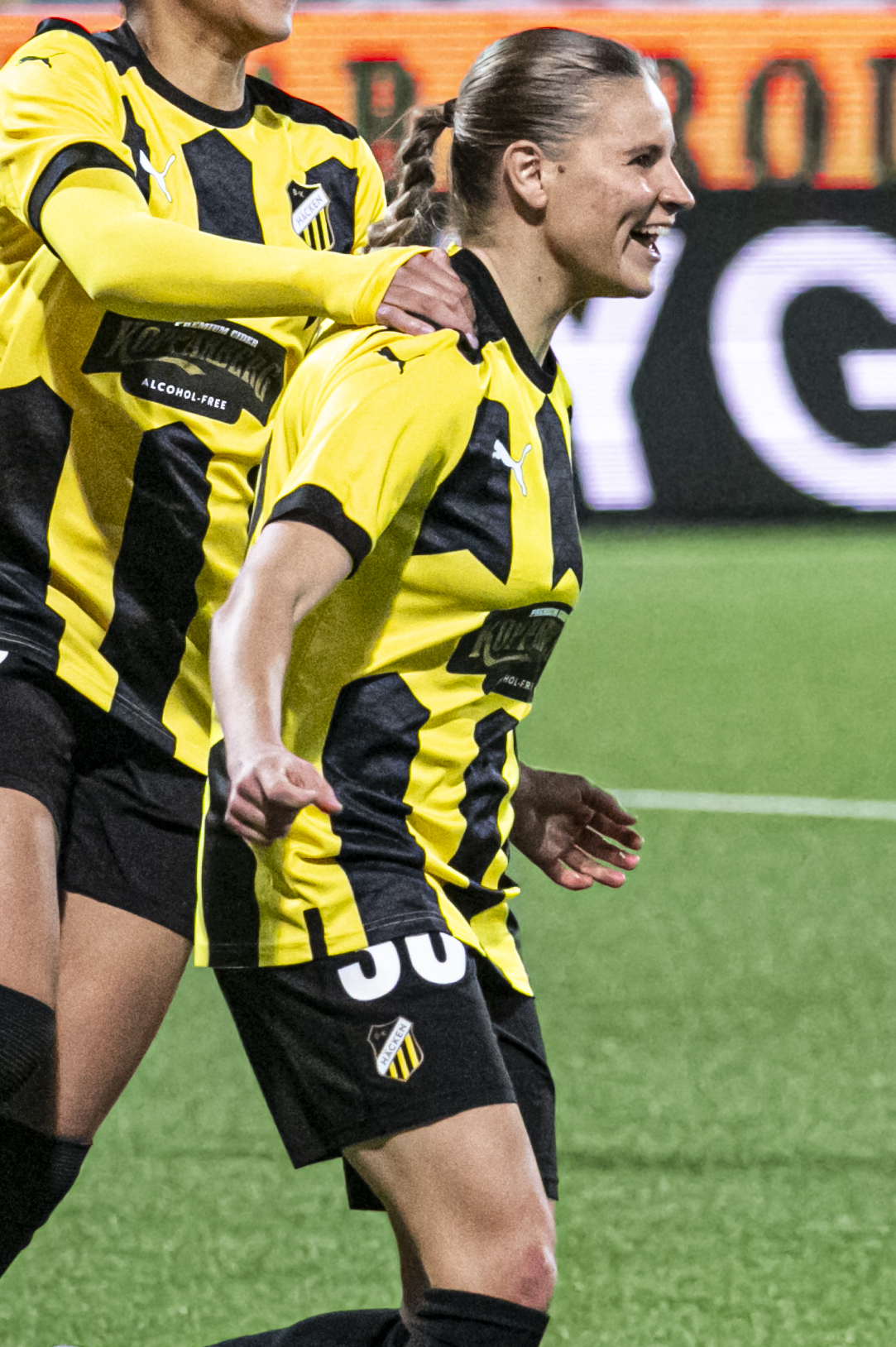
Kosola celebrating a goal for BK Häcken, in a UEFA Women's Champions League match against FC Twente in October 2023.

== Early career ==
Born in Hämeenlinna, Kosola started football with local club Hämeenlinnan Jalkapalloseura. She also played briefly for youth teams of Ilves, Hämeenlinnan Härmä, and Helsinki-based HFA Märsky. She made her senior debut with Härmä in 2018, playing in third-tier Naisten Kakkonen and scoring nine goals in six appearances.

== Club career ==
For the 2020 Kansallinen Liiga season, Kosola joined reigning champions HJK Helsinki. On 21 August 2020, it was announced that Kosola would continue with the club. During her time at HJK, she scored 9 goals in 41 games, and became one of the best wingers in the league.

In 2022, Kosola was announced by Damallsvenskan club Umeå IK.

In 2023, Kosola was announced at KIF Örebro, signing for the 2023 season.

On 29 August 2023, Kosola was announced at BK Häcken, signing a three-year deal with the club for an undisclosed fee. On 23 November 2023, Kosola scored the 2nd goal in a 2–1 win over Real Madrid in the UEFA Women's Champions League, scoring in the 76th minute. In April 2024, she suffered a serious ankle injury that kept her out for months.

On 7 January 2025, Kosola signed with Malmö FF on a three-year deal.

== International career ==
Kosola represented Finland U17 at the 2018 FIFA U-17 Women's World Cup in Uruguay.

Whilst playing for Umeå IK, Kosola got her first call up to the Finland national team, joining teammate Vilma Koivisto.

Kosola scored two goals against Slovakia in the 2023–24 UEFA Women's Nations League B.

Kosola was part of the Finland squad that won the 2023 Cyprus Women's Cup for the first time.

On 19 June 2025, Kosola was called up to the Finland squad for the UEFA Women's Euro 2025. On 2 July, in the first match of the tournament, Kosola scored the match winner for Finland in a 1–0 win against Iceland, winning also the Player of the Match award.

== Career statistics ==
=== Club ===
As of 3 July 2025

Appearances and goals by club, season and competition
Club	Season	League			National cup (Note: Includes Finnish Women's Cup and Svenska Cupen (women))		Europe		Other		Total	
Club	Season	Division	Apps	Goals	Apps	Goals	Apps	Goals	Apps	Goals	Apps	Goals
Hämeenlinnan Härmä	2018	Naisten Kakkonen	6	9	–		–		–		6	9
HJK	2020	Kansallinen Liiga	18	3	2	1	1 (Note: Includes UEFA Women's Champions League)	0	–		21	4
HJK	2021	Kansallinen Liiga	23	6	4	3	–		–		27	9
HJK	Total		41	9	6	4	1	0	0	0	48	13
Umeå IK	2022	Damallsvenskan	24	2	4	3	–		–		28	5
KIF Örebro	2023	Damallsvenskan	17	0	3	0	–		–		20	0
BK Häcken	2023	Damallsvenskan	9	1	5	1	10	2	–		24	4
BK Häcken	2024	Damallsvenskan	4	0	0	0	0	0	–		4	0
BK Häcken	Total		13	1	5	1	10	2	0	0	28	4
Malmö FF	2025	Damallsvenskan	11	0	3	0	–		–		14	0
Career total			112	21	21	8	11	2	0	0	144	31

=== International ===
As of 13 October 2026

Appearances and goals by national team and year
National team	Year	Apps	Goals
Finland	2022	1	0
Finland	2023	11	3
Finland	2024	5	0
Finland	2025	12	1
Finland	2026	7	1
Total		36	5

=== International goals ===
Scores and results list Finland's goal tally first, score column indicates score after each Kosola goal.

List of international goals scored by Katariina Kosola
No.	Date	Venue	Opponent	Score	Result	Competition
1.	7 April 2023	NTC Senec, Senec, Slovakia	Slovakia	1–0	1–0	Friendly
2.	22 September 2023	Veritas Stadium, Turku, Finland	Slovakia	3–0	4–0	2023–24 UEFA Women's Nations League
3.	22 September 2023	Veritas Stadium, Turku, Finland	Slovakia	4–0	4–0	2023–24 UEFA Women's Nations League
4.	2 July 2025	Arena Thun, Thun, Switzerland	Iceland	1–0	1–0	UEFA Women's Euro 2025
5.	14 April 2026	Töölö Football Stadium, Helsinki, Finland	Slovakia	1–0	4–2	2027 FIFA Women's World Cup qualification
