= Julia Stierli =

Swiss footballer (born 1997)

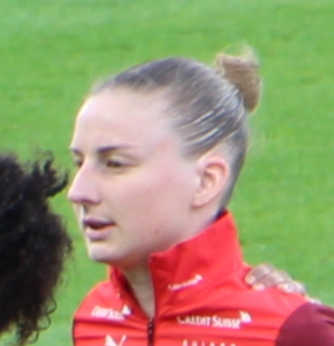

Personal information
- Full name: Julia Stierli
- Date of birth: 3 April 1997 (age 29)
- Place of birth: Muri, Switzerland
- Height: 1.82 m (5 ft 11 1/2 in)
- Position: Defender

Team information
- Current team: SC Freiburg
- Number: 5

Senior career*
Years	Team	Apps	(Gls)
2012–2014	FC Aarau		
2014–2024	Zürich	164	(23)
2024–	SC Freiburg	44	(1)

International career^{‡}
2017–	Switzerland	55	(2)
- * Club domestic league appearances and goals as of 22 November 2026 ‡ National team caps and goals as of 14 October 2026

Julia Stierli (born 3 April 1997) is a Swiss footballer who plays as a defender for SC Freiburg and the Switzerland national team.

== Career ==
=== Club ===
With the Stierli started her career at the age of eight with FC Muri. From 2012 to 2014 she played for FC Aarau and then switched to Zürich, with whom she won the double four times. As of 17 December 2020, she has played 25 games for Zurich in the UEFA Women's Champions League, scoring four goals. Best result was reaching the round of 16 in the 2014/15 season, where after a 2-1 home win, where she scored the winning goal, they lost 2-4 away to Glasgow City F.C. Season 2016/17 and 2018/19 they reached the round of 16 again, but were eliminated with a total of 0:17 goals against the ultimately successful defending champion Olympique Lyonnais and with a total of 0:5 goals against FC Bayern Munich. In the 2021/22 UEFA Women's Champions League, she was eliminated with Zurich by a 2-1 home defeat by AC Milan in the semi-finals of qualifying and thus missed the inaugural group stage. In the third-place play-off, which was irrelevant to progression and lost to Valur Reykjavík 3-1, she scored the goal to make it 3-1.

=== International ===
Stierli has been capped for the Switzerland national team, appearing for the team during the 2019 World Cup qualifying cycle.

On 23 June 2025, Stierli was called up to the Switzerland squad for the UEFA Women's Euro 2025.

== International goals ==
No.	Date	Venue	Opponent	Score	Result	Competition
1.	21 February 2023	Marbella Football Center, Marbella, Spain	Poland	1–1	1–1	Friendly
2.	13 October 2026	Stade de Tourbillon , Sion, Switzerland	Israel	2–0	2–0	2027 FIFA Women's World Cup qualification play-offs
