= Agla María Albertsdóttir =

Icelandic footballer (born 1999)

Personal information
- Date of birth: 5 August 1999 (age 27)
- Place of birth: Iceland
- Positions: Forward; attacking midfielder

Team information
- Current team: Breiðablik (on loan from BK Häcken)

Senior career*
Years	Team	Apps	(Gls)
2014–2015	Breiðablik	0	(0)
2015	Valur	8	(2)
2016–2017	Stjarnan	34	(8)
2018–2021	Breiðablik	66	(44)
2022–	BK Häcken	8	(0)
2022–	Breiðablik	43	(23)

International career^{‡}
2014–2016	Iceland U17	22	(4)
2015–2016	Iceland U19	5	(6)
2017–	Iceland	58	(4)
- * Club domestic league appearances and goals as of 24 March 2019 ‡ National team caps and goals as of 19:50, 3 July 2022 (UTC)

Agla María Albertsdóttir (born 5 August 1999) is an Icelandic footballer who plays as a forward or an attacking midfielder for Breiðablik. She has won the Icelandic championship five times in 2016, 2018, 2020, 2024 and 2025 as well as the Icelandic Cup three times in 2018, 2021 and 2025.

== Playing career ==
=== Club career ===
Agla María came up through the junior ranks of Breiðablik and was first called up to the senior team in 2014 when she was an unused sub in a Úrvalsdeild kvenna game against Selfoss. On 30 June 2015 Agla María moved to Valur where she made her professional debut on 17 July 2015, when she replaced Hildur Antonsdóttir in the 46th minute of a defeated against Þór/KA. On 14 January 2016 she signed with Stjarnan. She won the Icelandic championship with the club in September that year.

In January 2018, Agla María signed back with Breiðablik. In August 2018, she assisted in both goals in Breiðablik's 2–1 victory against Stjarnan in the Icelandic Cup Finals. On 17 September, she helped Breiðablik win the national championship after it defeated Selfoss in the Úrvalsdeild kvenna. In March 2019, she signed a new 3-year contract with Breiðablik.

=== National team career ===
Agla María debuted for Iceland U17 on 13 April 2014, at 15 years old, in a match against Wales. She participated in all the six matches Iceland U17 played in the 2016 UEFA Women's Under-17 Championship qualification. On 4 April 2015 Agla María debuted for Iceland U19 in a match against France. She subsequently was part of the group that tried to qualify for the 2015 UEFA Women's Under-19 Championship and for the 2016 UEFA Women's Under-19 Championship. On 6 April 2017 Agla María debuted for Iceland Senior Team in a match against Slovakia. On 22 June 2017 she was called by coach Freyr Alexandersson to represent Iceland at the UEFA Women's Euro 2017. She participated in all three matches Iceland played in the competition.

On 13 June 2025, Agla María was called up to the Iceland squad for the UEFA Women's Euro 2025.

== Honours ==
=== Club ===
Breiðablik

- Icelandic champion (5):
- Icelandic Cup (3):

=== Individual ===
- Úrvalsdeild Player of the Year: 2021
- Úrvalsdeild Golden Boot: 2020
