= UEFA Women's Euro 2025 =

European football tournament

Fussball-Europameisterschaft der Frauen 2025 Championnat d'Europe féminin de football 2025 Campionato europeo di calcio femminile 2025 Campiunadi d'Europa da ballape dunna 2025
- The Summit of Emotions

Tournament details
- Host country: Switzerland
- Dates: 2–27 July
- Teams: 16 (from 1 confederation)
- Venues: 8 (in 8 host cities)

Final positions
- Champions: England (2nd title)
- Runners-up: Spain

Tournament statistics
- Matches played: 31
- Goals scored: 106 (3.42 per match)
- Attendance: 657,291 (21,203 per match)
- Top scorer(s): (Spain) Esther González (4 goals)
- Best player: (Spain) Aitana Bonmatí
- Best young player: (England) Michelle Agyemang

The 2025 UEFA Women's Championship, commonly referred to as UEFA Women's Euro 2025 or simply Euro 2025, was the 14th edition of the UEFA Women's Championship, the quadrennial international football championship organised by UEFA for the women's national teams of Europe. The tournament was played in Switzerland from 2 to 27 July 2025. This was the third edition since the tournament was expanded to 16 teams. The tournament returned to its usual four-year cycle after the previous tournament was delayed to 2022 because of the COVID-19 pandemic.

Defending champions England retained the title, defeating Spain in the final via a penalty shootout. It was the first time a country defended their European title since Germany in 2013, and the first time the title was decided via a shootout since the inaugural tournament in 1984.

Record attendance and viewership across Europe caused the tournament to be declared a huge success by UEFA's head of women's football, Nadine Kessler. Every host city has also stated it was a massive success. The tournament broke the total attendance record, previously held by England in 2022, with 657,291 spectators.

== Host selection ==
Applications were submitted in August 2022, while final submissions were made in October. Switzerland was selected to host the tournament on 4 April 2023 at the UEFA Executive Committee in Lisbon, Portugal. To be appointed as hosts, a majority of votes was needed in the first round. If the first vote did not produce a majority, the two bids with the most votes would advance to a second and final round. As the first round produced a three-way tie for first, a ballot was used to determine which two bidders would proceed to the second round.

Voting results
| Country(s) | Votes by round | | |
| Country(s) | 1st | Tiebreak | 2nd |
|---|---|---|---|
| Switzerland | 4 | 6 | 9 |
| Denmark, Finland, Norway, Sweden | 4 | 4 | 4 |
| Poland | 4 | 3 | — |
| France | 1 | — | — |
| Total | 13 | 13 | 13 |

=== Confirmed bids ===
Four declarations of interest to host the tournament were received by UEFA before the deadline of 12 October 2022.

- Poland – On 3 June 2021, Zbigniew Boniek, head of the Polish Football Association, announced that the association had filed its bid at UEFA to host the 2025 Women's Championship, citing women's football as gaining in popularity in many European countries, including Poland.
- Denmark, Finland, Norway, Sweden – On 15 October 2021, the Danish Football Association announced that the Nordic countries Denmark, Finland, Norway, and Sweden, with support from Iceland and Faroe Islands, had confirmed their bids to host the UEFA Euro 2025. On 6 April they submitted their application with multiple stadiums in each host country. The government of Sweden declared its support on the 12th. Finland also submitted an application to be part of the 2025 women's football European Championship on 12 October 2022.
- France – On 3 February 2022, the French Football Federation and its president, Noël Le Graët, confirmed that France had been bidding for the organisation of the competition.
- Switzerland – On 14 September 2022, the Swiss Football Association officially confirmed the bid and announced Basel, Bern, Geneva, Lucerne, Lausanne (withdrew), Zurich, Thun, St. Gallen, and Sion as their candidate-cities to host the events.

Switzerland previously hosted the men's 1954 FIFA World Cup and co-hosted the men's UEFA Euro 2008 with Austria.

== Venues ==
During the bidding process, venues in Lausanne (Stade Olympique de la Pontaise), Neuchâtel (Stade de la Maladière) and Schaffhausen (Stadion Breite) failed to make the cut. Liechtenstein's capital, Vaduz, was also included in the Swiss bid, but due to the capacity of the Rheinpark Stadion not meeting requirements, the idea was scrapped. Right before the vote, Lausanne (with the Stade de la Tuilière as their proposed venue) voluntarily withdrew as a venue to focus on hosting the 2025 Swiss Federal Gymnastics Festival.

On 2 December 2023, the schedule was provisionally announced, with Basel chosen to host the opening match and final. Originally, the eight venues were going to be divided into four pairs (Basel and Lucerne, Zurich and St. Gallen, Bern and Thun, and Geneva and Sion) with each pair hosting one group. However, this was changed instead to having two different geographical clusters. With the exception of the opening match and a group C match, the two different geographical clusters were: Bern, Geneva, Sion and Thun in the west zone, with Basel, Lucerne, St. Gallen and Zurich in the east zone. Previously, Bern wanted to host the final, but after Young Boys raised concerns about the turf being damaged, they were only allowed to use the stadium as far as the quarterfinals.

For commercial reasons, venues in Lucerne (Swissporarena), St. Gallen (Kybunpark) and Thun (Stockhorn Arena) changed their names for the tournament. The four stadiums previously used in UEFA Euro 2008 (St. Jakob-Park, Stadion Wankdorf, Stade de Genève and Stadion Letzigrund) were chosen to host matches.

The following 8 host cities and stadiums were selected for Switzerland's bid:

| Basel | Bern | Geneva | Zurich |
|---|---|---|---|
| St. Jakob-Park | Stadion Wankdorf | Stade de Genève | Stadion Letzigrund |
| Capacity: 34,250 | Capacity: 29,800 | Capacity: 26,750 | Capacity: 22,700 |
UEFA Women's Euro 2025 is located in Switzerland
| St. Gallen | Lucerne | Thun | Sion |
| Arena St.Gallen | Allmend Stadion Luzern | Arena Thun | Stade de Tourbillon |
| Capacity: 16,300 | Capacity: 14,350 | Capacity: 8,100 | Capacity: 7,750 |

=== Team base camps ===
Each team chose a "team base camp" for its stay between the matches. The teams trained and resided in these locations throughout the tournament, travelling to games staged away from their bases. The "team base camp" needed to be in Switzerland. UEFA announced the hotels and training sites for each participating team; additional potential sites were later announced on 11 February 2025.

Team base camps
| Team | Training site | Hotel |
|---|---|---|
| Belgium | Stade Saint-Laurent, Saillon | Les Bains de Saillon Hôtel, Saillon |
| Denmark | Stade des Buchilles, Boudry | Hôtel Beaulac Neuchâtel, Neuchâtel |
| England | Sportanlage Au, Opfikon | Dolder Grand, Zurich |
| Finland | Centre Sportif de Versoix, Versoix | InterContinental Geneva, Geneva |
| France | Sportanlage Bützel, Thal | Hotel Heiden, Heiden |
| Germany | Sportzentrum Buchlern, Zurich | FIVE Zurich, Zurich |
| Iceland | Sportplatz Zelgli, Thun | Parkhotel Gunten, Gunten |
| Italy | Thermoplan Arena, Weggis | Campus Hotel Hertenstein, Weggis |
| Netherlands | Stadion Lachen, Thun | Belvédère Strandhotel, Spiez |
| Norway | Stade des Chézards, Colombier | Beau-Rivage Hôtel, Neuchâtel |
| Poland | Stadion Herti Allmend, Zug | SeminarHotel am Ägerisee, Unterägeri |
| Portugal | Stade des Arbères, Meyrin | Geneva Marriott Hotel, Geneva |
| Spain | Stade Juan-Antonio-Samaranch, Lausanne | Royal Savoy Hôtel & Spa, Lausanne |
| Sweden | Eizmoos, Cham | On Your Marks, Cham |
| Switzerland | FC Dürrenast, Thun | Hotel Seepark, Thun |
| Wales | Sportanlage Güttingersreuti, Weinfelden | Wellnesshotel Golfpanorama, Lipperswil |

== Qualification ==
Qualified Did not qualify Did not enter Suspended

All 55 UEFA national teams were able to submit an entry for the competition by 23 March 2023. This involved participation in both the inaugural 2023–24 UEFA Women's Nations League and UEFA Women's Euro 2025 qualifying. The Nations League took place between September 2023 and February 2024. The qualification was organised between April and December 2024.

In total, 51 teams entered the qualifying competition. Russia was not permitted to enter the competition, as Russian teams had been suspended indefinitely from UEFA and FIFA competitions in 28 February 2022 due to their country's invasion of Ukraine. In addition, Gibraltar, Liechtenstein and San Marino did not submit an entry.

Of the 16 qualified teams, 14 had taken part in the 2022 edition, while Austria and Northern Ireland missed out, having qualified in 2022. Poland and Wales both made their first appearance in a major finals tournament.

The lowest ranked team to qualify was Wales, ranked 30th, while the highest placed team to not qualify was Austria, positioned 19th.

=== Qualified teams ===
The following teams qualified for the final tournament alongside host Switzerland.

| Order | Team | Qualified as | Date of qualification | App | First | Last | Streak | Best performance | WR |
|---|---|---|---|---|---|---|---|---|---|
| 1 | Switzerland | Hosts | 4 April 2023 | 3rd | 2017 | 2022 | 3 | Group stage (2017, 2022) | 23 |
| 2 | Germany | Group A4 winners | 4 June 2024 | 12th | 1989 | 2022 | 12 | Champions (1989, 1991, 1995, 1997, 2001, 2005, 2009, 2013) | 3 |
| 3 | Spain | Group A2 winners | 4 June 2024 | 5th | 1997 | 2022 | 4 | Semi-finals (1997) | 2 |
| 4 | Iceland | Group A4 runners-up | 12 July 2024 | 5th | 2009 | 2022 | 5 | Quarter-finals (2013) | 14 |
| 5 | Denmark | Group A2 runners-up | 12 July 2024 | 11th | 1984 | 2022 | 8 | Runners-up (2017) | 12 |
| 6 | France | Group A3 winners | 12 July 2024 | 8th | 1997 | 2022 | 8 | Semi-finals (2022) | 10 |
| 7 | England | Group A3 runners-up | 16 July 2024 | 10th | 1984 | 2022 | 7 | Champions (2022) | 5 |
| 8 | Italy | Group A1 winners | 16 July 2024 | 13th | 1984 | 2022 | 8 | Runners-up (1993, 1997) | 13 |
| 9 | Netherlands | Group A1 runners-up | 16 July 2024 | 5th | 2009 | 2022 | 5 | Champions (2017) | 11 |
| 10 | Portugal | Play-off winners | 3 December 2024 | 3rd | 2017 | 2022 | 3 | Group stage (2017, 2022) | 22 |
| 11 | Norway | Play-off winners | 3 December 2024 | 13th | 1987 | 2022 | 13 | Champions (1987, 1993) | 13 |
| 12 | Finland | Play-off winners | 3 December 2024 | 5th | 2005 | 2022 | 2 | Semi-finals (2005) | 26 |
| 13 | Poland | Play-off winners | 3 December 2024 | 1st | Debut | | | | 27 |
| 14 | Sweden | Play-off winners | 3 December 2024 | 12th | 1984 | 2022 | 9 | Champions (1984) | 6 |
| 15 | Belgium | Play-off winners | 3 December 2024 | 3rd | 2017 | 2022 | 3 | Quarter-finals (2022) | 20 |
| 16 | Wales | Play-off winners | 3 December 2024 | 1st | Debut | | | | 30 |

== Final draw ==
The SwissTech Convention Center in Lausanne hosted the draw.

The final draw took place at 17:00 CET on 16 December 2024 at the SwissTech Convention Center in Lausanne. Former footballer, Ian Wright, and Swiss sports presenter, Annette Fetscherin, hosted the draw. The guests for the draw were all footballers who have participated in a men's or women's Euro. Those players were: Leonardo Bonucci, Verónica Boquete, Lara Dickenmann, Sami Khedira, Jill Scott, Caroline Seger, Xherdan Shaqiri and Raphaël Varane. The draw started with the hosts, Switzerland, being assigned to position A1. The draw continued with, in order, pots 1, 2, 3 and 4 being drawn, with each team selected then allocated into the first available group alphabetically. The position for the team within the group would then be drawn (for the purpose of the schedule).

=== Seeding ===
The seeding was according to the UEFA Women's Euro 2025 qualifying ranking.

Pot 1
| Team | Rank |
|---|---|
| Switzerland ^{H} | 19 |
| Spain | 1 |
| Germany | 2 |
| France | 3 |

Pot 2
| Team | Rank |
|---|---|
| Italy | 4 |
| Iceland | 5 |
| Denmark | 6 |
| England | 7 |

Pot 3
| Team | Rank |
|---|---|
| Netherlands | 8 |
| Sweden | 9 |
| Norway | 10 |
| Belgium | 12 |

Pot 4
| Team | Rank |
|---|---|
| Finland | 13 |
| Poland | 16 |
| Portugal | 17 |
| Wales | 20 |

=== Draw ===
Group A
| Pos | Team |
|---|---|
| A1 | Switzerland |
| A2 | Norway |
| A3 | Iceland |
| A4 | Finland |

Group B
| Pos | Team |
|---|---|
| B1 | Spain |
| B2 | Portugal |
| B3 | Belgium |
| B4 | Italy |

Group C
| Pos | Team |
|---|---|
| C1 | Germany |
| C2 | Poland |
| C3 | Denmark |
| C4 | Sweden |

Group D
| Pos | Team |
|---|---|
| D1 | France |
| D2 | England |
| D3 | Wales |
| D4 | Netherlands |

=== Schedule ===
Schedule
| Round | Matchday | Date |
|---|---|---|
| Group stage | Matchday 1 | 2–5 July 2025 |
| Group stage | Matchday 2 | 6–9 July 2025 |
| Group stage | Matchday 3 | 10–13 July 2025 |
| Knockout stage | Quarter-finals | 16–19 July 2025 |
| Knockout stage | Semi-finals | 22–23 July 2025 |
| Knockout stage | Final | 27 July 2025 |

== Squads ==
Each national team had to submit a squad of 23 players, three of whom had to be goalkeepers, by the deadline of 25 June 2025.

== Match officials ==
On 31 March 2025, UEFA announced the selected match officials for the tournament.

=== Referees ===
- (Brazil) Edina Alves Batista
- (Croatia) Ivana Martinčić
- (Denmark) Frida Klarlund
- (France) Stéphanie Frappart
- (Hungary) Katalin Kulcsár
- (Italy) Maria Sole Ferrieri Caputi
- (Italy) Silvia Gasperotti
- (Portugal) Catarina Campos
- (Romania) Iuliana Demetrescu
- (Romania) Alina Peșu
- (Spain) Marta Huerta de Aza
- (Sweden) Tess Olofsson
- (Switzerland) Désirée Grundbacher

=== Assistant referees ===
- (Andorra) Ainhoa Fernández
- (Austria) Amina Gutschi
- (Brazil) Neuza Back
- (Brazil) Fabrini Bevilaqua
- (Croatia) Sanja Rođak-Karšić
- (Denmark) Fie Bruun
- (England) Emily Carney
- (Finland) Heini Hyvönen
- (France) Camille Soriano
- (Hungary) Anita Vad
- (Italy) Francesca Di Monte
- (Lithuania) Irina Pozdejeva
- (Netherlands) Franca Overtoom
- (Norway) Monica Løkkeberg
- (Poland) Paulina Baranowska
- (Portugal) Andreia Ferreira Sousa
- (Portugal) Vanessa Gomes
- (Romania) Daniela Constatinescu
- (Romania) Mihaela Țepușă
- (Spain) Eliana Fernández
- (Spain) Guadalupe Porras Ayuso
- (Slovenia) Štaša Špur
- (Sweden) Almira Spahić
- (Switzerland) Susanne Küng
- (Switzerland) Linda Schmid
- (Ukraine) Svitlana Grushko

=== VARs ===
- (England) Jarred Gillett
- (England) Sian Massey-Ellis
- (France) Willy Delajod
- (Germany) Christian Dingert
- (Germany) Katrin Rafalski
- (Hungary) Tamás Bognár
- (Italy) Aleandro Di Paolo
- (Netherlands) Dennis Higler
- (Portugal) Tiago Martins
- (Romania) Cătălin Popa
- (Serbia) Momčilo Marković
- (Serbia) Jelena Cvetković
- (Slovenia) Alen Borošak
- (Spain) Guillermo Cuadra Fernández
- (Spain) Judit Romano García
- (Switzerland) Fedayi San

=== Support referees ===
- (Bulgaria) Hristiana Guteva
- (Netherlands) Shona Shukrula
- (Spain) Olatz Rivera Olmedo

== Group stage ==
Result of teams participating in UEFA Euro 2025: Winner Runner-up / Semi-finals Quarter-finals / Group stage

The provisional match schedule was confirmed by the UEFA Executive Committee during their meeting in Hamburg, Germany on 2 December 2023.

=== Tiebreakers ===
In the group stage, teams were ranked according to points (3 points for a win, 1 point for a draw, 0 points for a loss), and if tied on points, the following tiebreaking criteria would be applied, in the order given, to determine the rankings:

1. Points in head-to-head matches among tied teams;
2. Goal difference in head-to-head matches among tied teams;
3. Goals scored in head-to-head matches among tied teams;
4. If more than two teams were tied, and after applying all head-to-head criteria above, a subset of teams were still tied, all head-to-head criteria above would be reapplied exclusively to this subset of teams;
5. Goal difference in all group matches;
6. Goals scored in all group matches;
7. Lower disciplinary points (red card = 3 points, yellow card = 1 point, expulsion for two yellow cards in one match = 3 points);
8. Position in the Women's European Qualifiers overall phase rankings.

However, these criteria do not apply if two teams tied on points, goal difference and goals scored drew against each other in their final group match with knockout stage implications, and no other team in the group finished with the same number of points; in that case, the tie is broken by a penalty shoot-out.

All times are local, CEST (UTC+2).

=== Group A ===
| Pos | Team | Pld | W | D | L | GF | GA | GD | Pts | Qualification |
|---|---|---|---|---|---|---|---|---|---|---|
| 1 | Norway | 3 | 3 | 0 | 0 | 8 | 5 | +3 | 9 | Advance to knockout stage |
| 2 | Switzerland (H) | 3 | 1 | 1 | 1 | 4 | 3 | +1 | 4 (Note: Tied on head-to-head result (Finland 1–1 Switzerland). Overall goal difference was used as the tiebreaker.) | Advance to knockout stage |
| 3 | Finland | 3 | 1 | 1 | 1 | 3 | 3 | 0 | 4 | |
| 4 | Iceland | 3 | 0 | 0 | 3 | 3 | 7 | −4 | 0 | |

Source: UEFA
(H) Hosts
Notes:
2 July 2025
18:00

| Iceland | 0–1 | Finland |
|---|---|---|
| | Report | Kosola 70' |

Arena Thun, Thun
Attendance: 7,683
Referee: Katalin Kulcsár (Hungary)
2 July 2025
21:00

| Switzerland | 1–2 | Norway |
|---|---|---|
| Riesen 28' | Report | Hegerberg 54'; Stierli 58' (o.g.) |

St. Jakob-Park, Basel
Attendance: 34,063
Referee: Alina Peşu (Romania)

6 July 2025
18:00

| Norway | 2–1 | Finland |
|---|---|---|
| Nyström 3' (o.g.); Graham Hansen 84' | Report | Sevenius 32' |

Stade de Tourbillon, Sion
Attendance: 7,376
Referee: Silvia Gasperotti (Italy)
6 July 2025
21:00

| Switzerland | 2–0 | Iceland |
|---|---|---|
| Reuteler 76'; Pilgrim 90' | Report |

Stadion Wankdorf, Bern
Attendance: 29,658
Referee: Marta Huerta de Aza (Spain)

10 July 2025
21:00

| Finland | 1–1 | Switzerland |
|---|---|---|
| Kuikka 79' (pen.) | Report | Xhemaili 90+2' |

Stade de Genève, Geneva
Attendance: 26,388
Referee: Stéphanie Frappart (France)
10 July 2025
21:00

| Norway | 4–3 | Iceland |
|---|---|---|
| Gaupset 15', 26'; Maanum 49', 76' | Report | Jónsdóttir 6'; Eiríksdóttir 84'; Viggósdóttir 90+5' (pen.) |

Arena Thun, Thun
Attendance: 7,859
Referee: Alina Peșu (Romania)

=== Group B ===
| Pos | Team | Pld | W | D | L | GF | GA | GD | Pts | Qualification |
|---|---|---|---|---|---|---|---|---|---|---|
| 1 | Spain | 3 | 3 | 0 | 0 | 14 | 3 | +11 | 9 | Advance to knockout stage |
| 2 | Italy | 3 | 1 | 1 | 1 | 3 | 4 | −1 | 4 | Advance to knockout stage |
| 3 | Belgium | 3 | 1 | 0 | 2 | 4 | 8 | −4 | 3 | |
| 4 | Portugal | 3 | 0 | 1 | 2 | 2 | 8 | −6 | 1 | |

Source: UEFA
3 July 2025
18:00

| Belgium | 0–1 | Italy |
|---|---|---|
| | Report | Caruso 44' |

Stade de Tourbillon, Sion
Attendance: 7,544
Referee: Désirée Grundbacher (Switzerland)
3 July 2025
21:00

| Spain | 5–0 | Portugal |
|---|---|---|
| González 2', 43'; López 7'; Putellas 41'; Martín-Prieto 90+3' | Report |

Stadion Wankdorf, Bern
Attendance: 29,520
Referee: Iuliana Demetrescu (Romania)

7 July 2025
18:00

| Spain | 6–2 | Belgium |
|---|---|---|
| Putellas 22', 86'; Paredes 39'; González 52'; Caldentey 61'; Pina 81' | Report | Vanhaevermaet 24'; Eurlings 51' |

Arena Thun, Thun
Attendance: 7,961
Referee: Katalin Kulcsár (Hungary)
7 July 2025
21:00

| Portugal | 1–1 | Italy |
|---|---|---|
| Gomes 89' | Report | Girelli 70' |

Stade de Genève, Geneva
Attendance: 22,713
Referee: Ivana Martinčić (Croatia)

11 July 2025
21:00

| Italy | 1–3 | Spain |
|---|---|---|
| Oliviero 10' | Report | Athenea 14'; Guijarro 49'; González 90+1' |

Stadion Wankdorf, Bern
Attendance: 29,644
Referee: Iuliana Demetrescu (Romania)
11 July 2025
21:00

| Portugal | 1–2 | Belgium |
|---|---|---|
| Encarnação 87' | Report | Wullaert 3'; Cayman 90+6' |

Stade de Tourbillon, Sion
Attendance: 7,515
Referee: Tess Olofsson (Sweden)

=== Group C ===
| Pos | Team | Pld | W | D | L | GF | GA | GD | Pts | Qualification |
|---|---|---|---|---|---|---|---|---|---|---|
| 1 | Sweden | 3 | 3 | 0 | 0 | 8 | 1 | +7 | 9 | Advance to knockout stage |
| 2 | Germany | 3 | 2 | 0 | 1 | 5 | 5 | 0 | 6 | Advance to knockout stage |
| 3 | Poland | 3 | 1 | 0 | 2 | 3 | 7 | −4 | 3 | |
| 4 | Denmark | 3 | 0 | 0 | 3 | 3 | 6 | −3 | 0 | |

Source: UEFA
4 July 2025
18:00

| Denmark | 0–1 | Sweden |
|---|---|---|
| | Report | Angeldahl 55' |

Stade de Genève, Geneva
Attendance: 17,319
Referee: Edina Alves Batista (Brazil)
4 July 2025
21:00

| Germany | 2–0 | Poland |
|---|---|---|
| Brand 52'; Schüller 66' | Report |

Arena St.Gallen, St. Gallen
Attendance: 15,972
Referee: Stéphanie Frappart (France)

8 July 2025
18:00

| Germany | 2–1 | Denmark |
|---|---|---|
| Nüsken 56' (pen.); Schüller 66' | Report | Vangsgaard 26' |

St. Jakob-Park, Basel
Attendance: 34,165
Referee: Catarina Campos (Portugal)
8 July 2025
21:00

| Poland | 0–3 | Sweden |
|---|---|---|
| | Report | Blackstenius 28'; Asllani 52'; Hurtig 77' |

Allmend Stadion Luzern, Lucerne
Attendance: 14,176
Referee: Maria Sole Ferrieri Caputi (Italy)

12 July 2025
21:00

| Sweden | 4–1 | Germany |
|---|---|---|
| Blackstenius 12'; Holmberg 25'; Rolfö 34' (pen.); Hurtig 80' | Report | Brand 7' |

Stadion Letzigrund, Zurich
Attendance: 22,552
Referee: Silvia Gasperotti (Italy)
12 July 2025
21:00

| Poland | 3–2 | Denmark |
|---|---|---|
| Padilla 13'; Pajor 20'; Wiankowska 76' | Report | Thomsen 59'; Bruun 83' |

Allmend Stadion Luzern, Lucerne
Attendance: 14,213
Referee: Olatz Rivera Olmedo (Spain)

=== Group D ===
| Pos | Team | Pld | W | D | L | GF | GA | GD | Pts | Qualification |
|---|---|---|---|---|---|---|---|---|---|---|
| 1 | France | 3 | 3 | 0 | 0 | 11 | 4 | +7 | 9 | Advance to knockout stage |
| 2 | England | 3 | 2 | 0 | 1 | 11 | 3 | +8 | 6 | Advance to knockout stage |
| 3 | Netherlands | 3 | 1 | 0 | 2 | 5 | 9 | −4 | 3 | |
| 4 | Wales | 3 | 0 | 0 | 3 | 2 | 13 | −11 | 0 | |

Source: UEFA
5 July 2025
18:00

| Wales | 0–3 | Netherlands |
|---|---|---|
| | Report | Miedema 45+3'; Pelova 48'; Brugts 57' |

Allmend Stadion Luzern, Lucerne
Attendance: 14,147
Referee: Frida Klarlund (Denmark)
5 July 2025
21:00

| France | 2–1 | England |
|---|---|---|
| Katoto 36'; Baltimore 39' | Report | Walsh 87' |

Stadion Letzigrund, Zurich
Attendance: 22,542
Referee: Tess Olofsson (Sweden)

9 July 2025
18:00

| England | 4–0 | Netherlands |
|---|---|---|
| James 22', 60'; Stanway 45+2'; Toone 67' | Report |

Stadion Letzigrund, Zurich
Attendance: 22,600
Referee: Edina Alves Batista (Brazil)
9 July 2025
21:00

| France | 4–1 | Wales |
|---|---|---|
| Mateo 8'; Diani 45+1' (pen.); Majri 53'; Geyoro 63' | Report | Fishlock 13' |

Arena St.Gallen, St. Gallen
Attendance: 15,886
Referee: Désirée Grundbacher (Switzerland)

13 July 2025
21:00

| Netherlands | 2–5 | France |
|---|---|---|
| Pelova 26'; Bacha 41' (o.g.) | Report | Toletti 22'; Katoto 61'; Cascarino 64', 67'; Karchaoui 90+2' (pen.) |

St. Jakob-Park, Basel
Attendance: 34,133
Referee: Ivana Martinčić (Croatia)
13 July 2025
21:00

| England | 6–1 | Wales |
|---|---|---|
| Stanway 13' (pen.); Toone 21'; Hemp 30'; Russo 44'; Mead 72'; Beever-Jones 89' | Report | Cain 76' |

Arena St.Gallen, St. Gallen
Attendance: 15,953
Referee: Frida Klarlund (Denmark)

== Knockout stage ==
In the knockout stage, extra time and a penalty shoot-out were used to decide the winner if necessary.

=== Bracket ===
Quarter-finals
17 July – Zurich
Sweden | 2 (2)
England (p) | 2 (3)
16 July – Geneva
Norway | 1
Italy | 2
19 July – Basel
France | 1 (5)
Germany (p) | 1 (6)
18 July – Bern
Spain | 2
Switzerland | 0

Semi-finals
22 July – Geneva
England (a.e.t.) | 2
Italy | 1
23 July – Zurich
Germany | 0
Spain (a.e.t.) | 1

Final
27 July – Basel
England (p) | 1 (3)
Spain | 1 (1)

=== Quarter-finals ===
16 July 2025
21:00

| Norway | 1–2 | Italy |
|---|---|---|
| Hegerberg 66' | Report | Girelli 50', 90' |

Stade de Genève, Geneva
Attendance: 26,276
Referee: Stéphanie Frappart (France)

17 July 2025
21:00

| Sweden | 2–2 (a.e.t.) | England |
|---|---|---|
| Asllani 2'; Blackstenius 25' | Report | Bronze 79'; Agyemang 81' |
Penalties
| Angeldahl (penalty missed); Zigiotti Olme (penalty scored); Eriksson (penalty missed); Björn (penalty scored); Falk (penalty missed); Jakobsson (penalty missed); Holmberg (penalty missed) | 2–3 | (penalty scored) Russo; (penalty missed) James; (penalty missed) Mead; (penalty missed) Greenwood; (penalty scored) Kelly; (penalty missed) Clinton; (penalty scored) Bronze |

Stadion Letzigrund, Zurich
Attendance: 22,397
Referee: Marta Huerta de Aza (Spain)

18 July 2025
21:00

| Spain | 2–0 | Switzerland |
|---|---|---|
| Athenea 66'; Pina 71' | Report |

Stadion Wankdorf, Bern
Attendance: 29,734
Referee: Maria Sole Ferrieri Caputi (Italy)

19 July 2025
21:00

| France | 1–1 (a.e.t.) | Germany |
|---|---|---|
| Geyoro 15' (pen.) | Report | Nüsken 25' |
Penalties
| Majri (penalty missed); Karchaoui (penalty scored); Malard (penalty scored); Baltimore (penalty scored); Jean-François (penalty scored); N'Dongala (penalty scored); Sombath (penalty missed) | 5–6 | (penalty scored) Minge; (penalty scored) Dallmann; (penalty scored) Knaak; (penalty missed) Däbritz; (penalty scored) Berger; (penalty scored) Bühl; (penalty scored) Nüsken |

St. Jakob-Park, Basel
Attendance: 34,128
Referee: Tess Olofsson (Sweden)

=== Semi-finals ===
22 July 2025
21:00

| England | 2–1 (a.e.t.) | Italy |
|---|---|---|
| Agyemang 90+6'; Kelly 119' | Report | Bonansea 33' |

Stade de Genève, Geneva
Attendance: 26,539
Referee: Ivana Martinčić (Croatia)

23 July 2025
21:00

| Germany | 0–1 (a.e.t.) | Spain |
|---|---|---|
| | Report | Bonmatí 113' |

Stadion Letzigrund, Zurich
Attendance: 22,432
Referee: Edina Alves Batista (Brazil)

=== Final ===
27 July 2025
18:00

| England | 1–1 (a.e.t.) | Spain |
|---|---|---|
| Russo 57' | Report | Caldentey 25' |
Penalties
| Mead (penalty missed); Greenwood (penalty scored); Charles (penalty scored); Williamson (penalty missed); Kelly (penalty scored) | 3–1 | (penalty scored) Guijarro; (penalty missed) Caldentey; (penalty missed) Bonmatí; (penalty missed) Paralluelo |

St. Jakob-Park, Basel
Attendance: 34,203
Referee: Stéphanie Frappart (France)

== Statistics ==
=== Goalscorers ===
There were 106 goals scored in 31 matches, for an average of 3.42 goals per match.

4 goals

- (Spain) Esther González

3 goals

- (Italy) Cristiana Girelli
- (Spain) Alexia Putellas
- (Sweden) Stina Blackstenius

2 goals

- (England) Michelle Agyemang
- (England) Lauren James
- (England) Alessia Russo
- (England) Georgia Stanway
- (England) Ella Toone
- (France) Delphine Cascarino
- (France) Grace Geyoro
- (France) Marie-Antoinette Katoto
- (Germany) Jule Brand
- (Germany) Sjoeke Nüsken
- (Germany) Lea Schüller
- (Netherlands) Victoria Pelova
- (Norway) Signe Gaupset
- (Norway) Ada Hegerberg
- (Norway) Frida Maanum
- (Spain) Mariona Caldentey
- (Spain) Athenea del Castillo
- (Spain) Clàudia Pina
- (Sweden) Kosovare Asllani
- (Sweden) Lina Hurtig

1 goal

- (Belgium) Janice Cayman
- (Belgium) Hannah Eurlings
- (Belgium) Justine Vanhaevermaet
- (Belgium) Tessa Wullaert
- (Denmark) Signe Bruun
- (Denmark) Janni Thomsen
- (Denmark) Amalie Vangsgaard
- (England) Agnes Beever-Jones
- (England) Lucy Bronze
- (England) Lauren Hemp
- (England) Chloe Kelly
- (England) Beth Mead
- (England) Keira Walsh
- (Finland) Katariina Kosola
- (Finland) Natalia Kuikka
- (Finland) Oona Sevenius
- (France) Sandy Baltimore
- (France) Kadidiatou Diani
- (France) Sakina Karchaoui
- (France) Amel Majri
- (France) Clara Mateo
- (France) Sandie Toletti
- (Iceland) Hlín Eiríksdóttir
- (Iceland) Sveindís Jane Jónsdóttir
- (Iceland) Glódís Perla Viggósdóttir
- (Italy) Arianna Caruso
- (Italy) Barbara Bonansea
- (Italy) Elisabetta Oliviero
- (Netherlands) Esmee Brugts
- (Netherlands) Vivianne Miedema
- (Norway) Caroline Graham Hansen
- (Poland) Natalia Padilla
- (Poland) Ewa Pajor
- (Poland) Martyna Wiankowska
- (Portugal) Telma Encarnação
- (Portugal) Diana Gomes
- (Spain) Aitana Bonmatí
- (Spain) Patricia Guijarro
- (Spain) Vicky López
- (Spain) Cristina Martín-Prieto
- (Spain) Irene Paredes
- (Sweden) Filippa Angeldahl
- (Sweden) Smilla Holmberg
- (Sweden) Fridolina Rolfö
- (Switzerland) Alayah Pilgrim
- (Switzerland) Géraldine Reuteler
- (Switzerland) Nadine Riesen
- (Switzerland) Riola Xhemaili
- (Wales) Hannah Cain
- (Wales) Jess Fishlock

1 own goal

- (Finland) Eva Nyström (against Norway)
- (France) Selma Bacha (against Netherlands)
- (Switzerland) Julia Stierli (against Norway)

=== Awards ===

UEFA Team of the Tournament

UEFA Team of the Tournament

UEFA's technical observer team was given the objective of naming a team of the best eleven players from the tournament. Four players from the winning England squad were named in the team as well as four from runners-up Spain.

| Goalkeeper | Defenders | Midfielders | Forwards |
|---|---|---|---|
| (England) Hannah Hampton | (Germany) Franziska Kett (Italy) Elena Linari (Spain) Irene Paredes (England) Lucy Bronze | (Spain) Alexia Putellas (Spain) Patricia Guijarro (Spain) Aitana Bonmatí | (England) Chloe Kelly (England) Alessia Russo (Germany) Jule Brand |

Player of the Tournament

The Player of the Tournament award was given to Aitana Bonmatí, who was chosen by UEFA's technical observers.

- (Spain) Aitana Bonmatí

Young Player of the Tournament

The Young Player of the Tournament award was open to players born on or after 1 January 2003. The award was given to Michelle Agyemang, as chosen by UEFA's technical observers.

- (England) Michelle Agyemang

Top Scorer

The top scorer award, sponsored by Grifols, was given to the top goalscorer in the tournament. Esther González won the award with four goals scored in the tournament.

- (Spain) Esther González (4 goals)

Goal of the Tournament

The Goal of the Tournament was decided by UEFA's Technical Observer panel. On 28 July 2025, UEFA announced that France forward Delphine Cascarino's goal against the Netherlands had been named the goal of the tournament.

- (France) Delphine Cascarino (vs Netherlands)

The Technical Observer panel ranked a list of the top ten goals of the tournament, four of which were scored by Spain:

Top ten goals of the tournament
| Rank | Player | Match | Goal |
|---|---|---|---|
| 1st place, gold medalist(s) | (France) Delphine Cascarino | vs Netherlands | 3–2 |
| 2 | (Norway) Caroline Graham Hansen | vs Finland | 2–1 |
| 3 | (Spain) Alexia Putellas | vs Portugal | 3–0 |
| 4 | (Germany) Jule Brand | vs Poland | 1–0 |
| 5 | (Italy) Cristiana Girelli | vs Portugal | 1–0 |
| 6 | (Spain) Aitana Bonmatí | vs Germany | 1–0 |
| 7 | (Spain) Athenea del Castillo | vs Italy | 1–1 |
| 8 | (England) Alessia Russo | vs Spain | 1–1 |
| 9 | (Spain) Clàudia Pina | vs Belgium | 5–2 |
| 10 | (Netherlands) Vivianne Miedema | vs Wales | 1–0 |

== Marketing ==
=== Official mascot and match ball ===
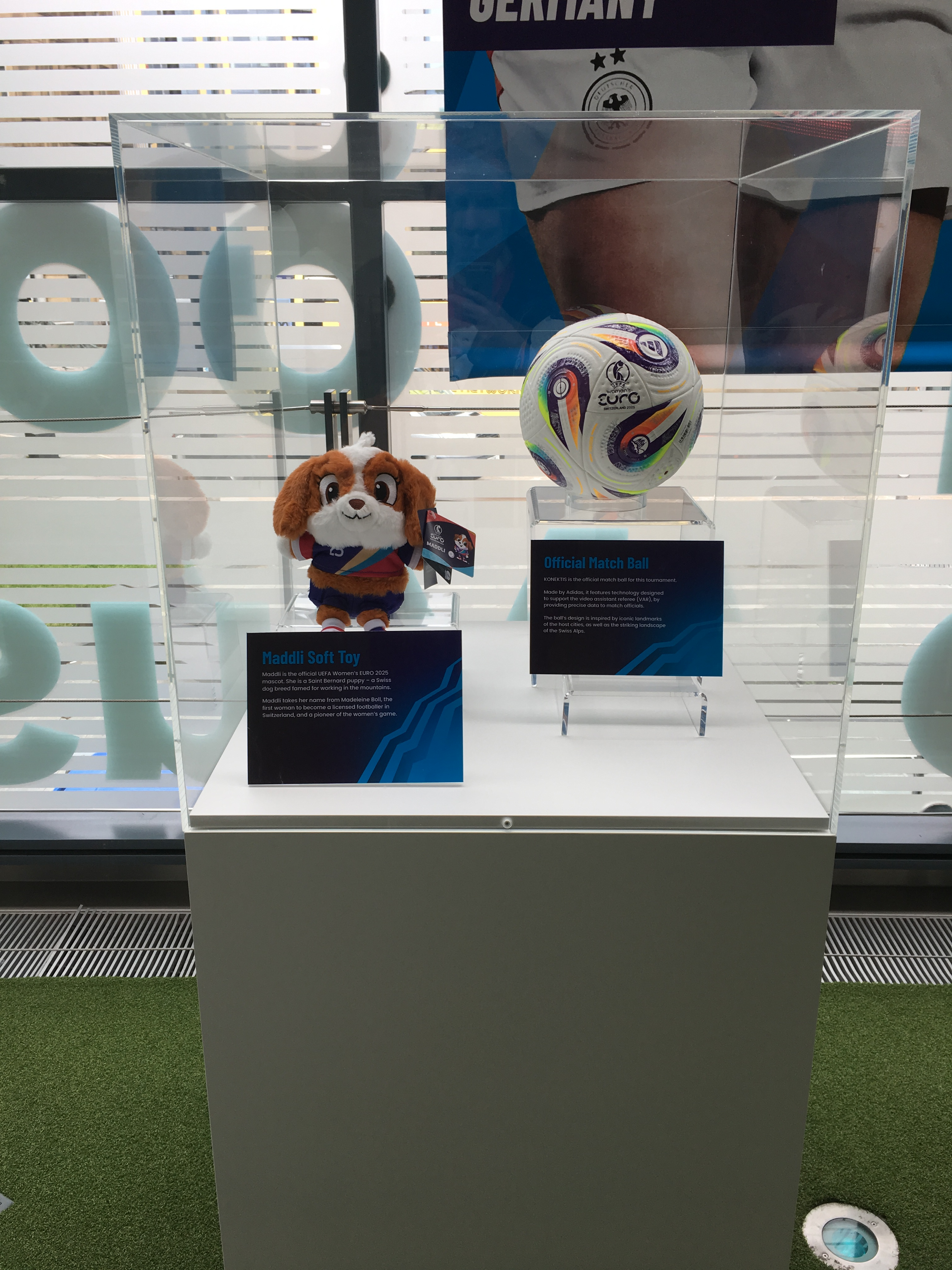
Maddli and Konektis displayed during the tournament at the National Football Museum

On 29 November 2024, the official mascot was unveiled. Her name is Maddli, a Saint Bernard puppy. On 16 December 2024, the official ball was announced, named Konektis.

=== Sponsors ===
| UEFA Women's Football global sponsors | National partners |
|---|---|
| Adidas; Amazon; Axa; Booking.com; EA Sports; Euronics; Grifols; Heineken; Hublot; Just Eat Takeaway.com; Lidl; PepsiCo; PlayStation; Unilever; Visa; Volkswagen | Miele; PHW Group (Wiesenhof); Swisscom; Swissquote; Yuh |

=== Preparations ===
Switzerland stated that their goal was to sell out every game at the tournament, and increase the benchmark for women's sporting events.

On 8 March 2024, to celebrate 500 days to go before the tournament starts, the Swiss Football Association organised a kick off event in Bern. During the event, they launched their slogan for the tournament, Summit of Emotions.

Despite being skeptical about the money involved, Lucerne funded the tournament for 4 million francs, organising an event exactly a year before the tournament started. The Security Commission in Bern approved a loan of 1.2 million francs for sports promotion after the tournament. The Finance Committee of the Council of States applied for a loan of 5 million francs for Swiss tourism in regards to the tournament. They added another 1.13 million francs on 11 June 2024.

On 31 May 2024, the Swiss Football Association published their legacy plan. The tournament coordinator, Doris Keller, also emphasized the hope that the tournament would have an impact for Swiss women's football. On 14 June 2024, before the start of UEFA Euro 2024, a Swiss Federation delegation went to the Swiss embassy in Berlin, to have a sport-related party, and discussed their ambitions for Euro 2025.

It was projected that 80% of people attending the matches will be Swiss. During the ticket launch event, a campaign to find volunteers was started. On 24 October 2024, Zurich unveiled their ambassadors for the tournament. On 4 March 2025, a human rights declaration was signed. On 11 March 2025, a special art exhibition was held at the UEFA headquarters.

=== Tickets ===
Around 720,000 tickets were on sale for the tournament. Ticket prices started at 25 francs. Tickets were put up for sale on 1 October 2024. A ticket launch event took place at the Jungfraujoch. As of 18 December 2024, over 300,000 tickets had been sold, with Germany, England, Wales, France, and Norway being the countries with the highest ticket sales outside of Switzerland. As of the start of the tournament, over 600,000 tickets had been sold, surpassing the previous record for the event of 574,875 tickets sold at the 2022 England tournament.

=== One-year-to-go events ===
Several cities around early July 2024 organised events to commemorate a year before the opening match kicks off.

Bern

The city of Bern held a one year to go event in collaboration with the Tour de Berne, with activities on 30 June 2024 at the Bundesplatz. Municipal Councillor Reto Nause said:

We are looking forward to an unforgettable football festival here in the heart of Europe, in the heart of Switzerland, in the heart of Bern!

Basel

In Basel, a countdown clock was unveiled and activated on 2 July. Plus, a tram advertising the Women's Euro traveled around the city. Basel set aside 12.9 million francs for the European Championship.

Zurich

In Zurich, it was confirmed that a fan zone will be set up on Europaallee. Similar to Basel, a tram with the Women's Euro design and colours traveled around the city.

Lucerne

Lucerne Cantonal Councillor Michaela Tschuor and Mayor Beat Züsli were at the Europaplatz to promote the tournament. A mobile football field also traveled on the road around Lucerne's municipalities.

Michaela Tschuor said at the media event in Europaplatz:

It is a great honour for us to be able to welcome top female footballers next year, it is important to us to promote women and young girls, and to focus on the importance of this sport.

St. Gallen

St. Gallen held a media conference to underline their plans for the tournament. City Councillor Mathias Gabathuler said he wanted to unleash a wave of enthusiasm for women's football in the city. The canton would also support a training course for women, while Céline Bradke, Women's Euro Project Manager for St. Gallen, announced that around 200 volunteers would be present on match days.

The city and canton of St. Gallen together pledged 2.8 million francs for the planning, organisation and implementation of the event.

== Broadcasting ==
=== UEFA ===
| Territory | Broadcaster | References |
|---|---|---|
| Albania | RTSH | |
| Andorra | RTVE, TF1, France Télévisions | |
| Armenia | Armenia 1TV | |
| Austria | ORF | |
| Belgium | VRT (Dutch) | |
| Belgium | RTBF (French) | |
| Bosnia and Herzegovina | BHRT | |
| Bulgaria | BNT | |
| Croatia | HRT | |
| Cyprus | CyBC | |
| Czech Republic | ČT Sport | |
| Denmark | Viaplay | |
| Estonia | ERR | |
| Finland | YLE | |
| France | TF1 - France Télévisions | |
| Georgia | First Channel | |
| Germany | ARD - ZDF | |
| Greece | ERT | |
| Hungary | M4 Sport | |
| Iceland | RÚV | |
| Ireland | RTÉ | |
| Italy | RAI | |
| Kosovo | RTK | |
| Latvia | LTV | |
| Liechtenstein | SRG SSR | |
| Lithuania | LRT | |
| Luxembourg | RTBF Tipik & Auvio (French) | |
| Luxembourg | Sporza and VRT | |
| Malta | TVMSport | |
| Moldova | TVR | |
| Monaco | TF1 | |
| Montenegro | RTCG | |
| Netherlands | NOS | |
| North Macedonia | MRT | |
| Norway | NRK - TV 2 | |
| Poland | TVP | |
| Portugal | RTP | |
| Romania | TVR | |
| San Marino | RAI | |
| Serbia | RTS | |
| Slovakia | RTVS | |
| Slovenia | RTV SLO | |
| Spain | RTVE | |
| Sweden | SVT - Viaplay | |
| Switzerland | SRG SSR | |
| Turkey | TRT | |
| United Kingdom | BBC - ITV - S4C | |
| Ukraine | Megogo | |

Due to the Russian invasion of Ukraine, UEFA was unable to find broadcasters for Russia and Belarus.

=== Outside UEFA ===
| Territory | Broadcaster | References |
|---|---|---|
| Australia | Optus Sport | |
| Australia | Stan Sport | |
| Brazil | Cazé TV | |
| Canada | TSN, CTV | |
| French overseas territories and French Guiana | TF1 | |
| Ghana | Sporty TV | |
| Hong Kong | HOY TV | |
| Indian subcontinent | Fancode | |
| Kenya | Sporty TV | |
| Latin America | ESPN | |
| MENA | beIN Sports | |
| Nigeria | Sporty TV | |
| South Africa | Sporty TV | |
| South Korea | SPOTV | |
| Sub-Saharan Africa | Azam Sports | |
| Sub-Saharan Africa | SuperSport | |
| Sub-Saharan Africa | New World Sport | |
| United States | Fox Sports (English) | |
| United States | TUDN / Vix (Spanish) | |
| Worldwide (in-flight and cruise ship markets) | Sport 24 | |

== Forecasts ==
Statisticians from the Technical University of Dortmund and the University of Innsbruck calculated the winning probabilities of all teams in the run-up to the tournament. According to the results, the probability of Spain having won the title was 27.2 percent, Germany 23.0 percent, France 17.6 percent and England 17.2 percent. The analysis was built on statistical models based on past match data and betting odds, which were used to simulate the tournament 100,000 times.

== Controversies ==
=== Government funding ===
On 31 January 2024, the Swiss federal government announced they would support the tournament with 4 million francs. This sparked controversy as during the bidding process, they promised 15 million francs, which was seen as a big reason why the Swiss bid won. Many people around women's football and politicians in Switzerland criticised the funding cuts, with people from the former saying how England's hosting of the 2022 edition changed the perception of the sport in the country and had big economic benefits for the host cities. Regarding the latter, co-president of the parliamentary group "Euro 25" Corina Gredig, said that the tournament would become a "junk tournament" with the lack of money. While municipal councillor of host city Thun, Katharina Ali-Oesch, said the city would have had to withdraw as a host venue due to the cuts in funding.

The Swiss Football Association also said that this money would only have been partially sufficient for their goals for the tournament, and hoped the situation would be taken up again in the further political discussion.

On 16 February 2024, the Committee of the Council of States for Science, Education and Culture, applied for a federal contribution of 15 million francs for the competition. The Council of States was able to get a cross-party commission motion calling for the federal government to support the Women's Euro 2025 in Switzerland with 15 million francs to be unanimously approved by the lower house.

Then, on 6 March 2024, the eight host cities sent a letter to the federal government asking them to reconsider their decision, stating that they have spent millions on this tournament and hoped for improvements.

On 19 April 2024, mayor of Lucerne, Beat Züsli, stated that in order to make the tournament as sustainable as possible, the 15 million francs are vital.

On 27 April 2024, the Swiss house of representatives voted in favour of increasing the money to 15 million francs.

On 8 May 2024, the finance commission also threw in their support for a potential increase in financial support.

On 30 May 2024, the Council of States and the National Council officially reversed the decision to allocate 4 million and increased the distributed money to 15 million.

In December 2024, the Grand Chamber approved the motion to distribute 15 million francs for the tournament.

=== Basel's concerns ===
On 30 August 2023, it was reported that while Basel wanted to host the tournament, they were concerned about the additional costs and scheduling conflicts that would occur due to hosting the competition. Also, it was deemed necessary by UEFA that Basel needed to guarantee that there would be no blackout in St. Jakob-Park during the tournament and requested that they upgrade their lights. However, on 29 September 2023, the problems were fixed as, at a cost of 1 million francs, LED lights were put in place for the stadium, despite no host city contract had been signed.

=== Participation of Israel in qualification ===
The qualifying match between Scotland and Israel on 31 May and the return fixture on 4 June 2024, were played behind closed doors due to anticipated protests against the Gaza war. The 31 May match was delayed 30 minutes after a protester wearing a "Red Card For Israel" T-shirt chained himself to one of the goal frames just before the scheduled kick-off time. About 400 pro-Palestinian protesters also gathered outside the national stadium in Glasgow.

== See also ==
- UEFA Euro 2024
