= Ingrid Ryland =

Norwegian footballer (born 1989)

Personal information
- Full name: Ingrid Ryland
- Date of birth: 29 May 1989 (age 37)
- Place of birth: Førde, Norway
- Height: 1.65 m (5 ft 5 in)
- Position: Right-back

Youth career
- Austrheim
- Åsane

Senior career*
Years	Team	Apps	(Gls)
2007–2014	Arna-Bjørnar	132	(8)
2015	Liverpool	8	(0)
2015–2017	Avaldsnes IL	39	(3)
2018	Djurgården	11	(0)
2019-2021	IL Sandviken	50	(5)
2022	Brann	15	(2)

International career^{‡}
2010–2018	Norway	22	(0)
Medal record
Women's football
Representing Norway
UEFA Women's Championship
Silver medal – second place	2013 Sweden	Team
- * Club domestic league appearances and goals as of 08 August 2019 (UTC) ‡ National team caps and goals as of 24 January 2018

Ingrid Ryland (born 29 May 1989) is a Norwegian former footballer who played as a right-back.

She previously played for Toppserien team Arna-Bjørnar from 2007 until 2014. In January 2015 her transfer to FA WSL club Liverpool was announced. Liverpool failed miserably to defend their WSL title and Ryland was among four players to be released by the club at the end of the 2015 season. She subsequently returned to Norway to sign for Avaldsnes IL.

She was called up to be part of the national team for the UEFA Women's Euro 2013. In the final against Germany at Friends Arena, Ryland was an unused substitute. Anja Mittag's goal gave the Germans their sixth successive European title.

== Career statistics ==
As of 24 January 2018

Season	Club	Division	League		National Cup		League Cup		Europe		Total	
Season	Club	Division	Apps	Goals	Apps	Goals	Apps	Goals	Apps	Goals	Apps	Goals
2007	Arna-Bjørnar	Toppserien	16	0	0	0	—		—		16	0
2008	Arna-Bjørnar	Toppserien	22	0	0	0	—		—		22	0
2010	Arna-Bjørnar	Toppserien	21	0	0	0	—		—		21	0
2011	Arna-Bjørnar	Toppserien	18	1	1	0	—		—		19	1
2012	Arna-Bjørnar	Toppserien	15	2	4	0	—		—		19	2
2013	Arna-Bjørnar	Toppserien	22	1	2	0	—		—		24	1
2014	Arna-Bjørnar	Toppserien	18	4	2	1	—		—		20	5
2015	Liverpool	FA WSL 1	8	0	0	0	—		—		8	0
2016	Avaldsnes IL	Toppserien	21	2	2	0	—		—		21	2
2017	Avaldsnes IL	Toppserien	18	1	5	2	—		—		23	3
Career total			179	11	16	3	0	0	0	0	195	14
