= 2012 Norwegian Women's Cup =

Norgesmesterskapet i fotball for kvinner 2012

Tournament details
- Country: Norway
- Teams: 50

Final positions
- Champions: Stabaek
- Runners-up: Roa

Tournament statistics
- Matches played: 49

The 2012 Norwegian Women's Cup was the 35th season of the Norwegian annual knockout football tournament for women. The tournament started on 8 May 2012, and ended on 24 November 2012 with the final. The defending champions are Stabæk which beat Røa in the last year's final on penalties.

After playing the last three finals in Telenor Arena, the Football Association of Norway announced on 6 June 2012 that this year's final will be played on Åråsen Stadion.

Stabaek won the final 4–0 over Roa.

== First round ==
Team 1	Score	Team 2
8 May 2012
Loddefjord	2–7	Linderud-Grei
Avaldsnes	8–0	Fana
Førde	0–5	Kaupanger
Grand Bodø	7–0	Sandnessjøen
Hardhaus	0–5	Medkila
Haugar	2–1	Åsane
Volda	0–2	Fortuna
Lyngdal	0–7	Urædd
Nymark	2–3	Voss
Sunndal	1–2	Træff
Tromsdalen	1–3	Fløya
Øvrevoll Hosle	2–5	Sarpsborg 08
Sola	3–2	Gimletroll
Skarphedin	2–1	Eik-Tønsberg
Fossum (Skien)	5–3	Konnerud
Tynset	11–0	Lillehammer
Konsvinger	4–1	Raufoss
Freidig	1–0	Byåsen

== Second round ==
Team 1	Score	Team 2
5 June 2012
Sarpsborg 08	2–1	Fortuna Ålesund
Fossum (Skien)	0–4	Kolbotn
Kongsvinger	0–7	Stabæk
Tynset	0–8	Trondheims-Ørn
Urædd	0–7	Røa
Skarphedin	0–3	Amazon Grimstad
Sola	4–5	Klepp
Haugar	1–2	Arna-Bjørnar
Avaldsnes	9–1	Voss
Kaupanger	1–2	Sandviken
Hødd	1–9	LSK Kvinner
Træff	0–4	Vålerenga
Freidig	0–7	Kattem
Medkila	2–1	Grand Bodø
Alta	0–5	Fløya
Linderud-Grei	0–1	Fart

== Third round ==
Team 1	Score	Team 2
27 June 2012
Røa	6–1	Kattem
Fløya	0–3	Stabæk
Vålerenga	0–1	Sandviken
Amazon Grimstad	3–0	Avaldsnes
Arna-Bjørnar	4–1	Klepp
Trondheims-Ørn	1–1 (5–4 on penalties)	Medkila
LSK Kvinner	5–1	Sarpsborg 08
Kolbotn	1–0	Fart

== Quarter-finals ==
Number of teams per tier entering this round
Toppserien (1)	1. divisjon (2)	2. divisjon (3)	Total
8 / 12	0 / 12	0 / 76	8 / 100

31 July 2012	Arna-Bjørnar (1)	4–1	(1) Kolbotn	Bergen
18:00	Eikeland 6'; Mjelde 25'; Hansen 82', 90'	Report	Tomter 65'	Stadium: Arna Idrettspark; Attendance: 247; Referee: Monica Larsen

31 July 2012	Stabæk (1)	4–0	(1) Trondheims-Ørn	Bærum
18:00	Pedersen 3'; Moore 36', 56'; Hansen 54'	Report		Stadium: Nadderud Stadion; Attendance: 514; Referee: Marte Sørø

31 July 2012	Sandviken (1)	0–1	(1) Amazon Grimstad	Bergen
18:00		Report	Åvik 66'	Stadium: Stemmemyren Kunstgress; Attendance: 252; Referee: Henrikke Nervik

31 July 2012	LSK Kvinner (1)	1–3	(1) Røa	Lillestrøm
19:00	Knudsen 26'	Report	Thorsnes 72', 85'; Haavi 81'	Stadium: LSK-Hallen; Attendance: 337; Referee: Ann Wenche Kleven

== Semi-finals ==
10 October 2012	Amazon Grimstad (1)	0–3	(1) Stabæk	Grimstad
15:30		Report	Hansen 77'; Hegerberg 86', 88'	Stadium: Levermyr Stadion; Attendance: 561; Referee: Christina W. Pedersen

11 October 2012	Røa (1)	3–1	(1) Arna-Bjørnar	Oslo
15:30	Tårnes 1'; Herregården 67'; Haavi 74'	Report	Hansen 81'	Stadium: Røa Kunstgress; Attendance: 205; Referee: Monica Larsen

== Final ==
24 November 2012
16:00

Røa	0–4	Stabæk
	Report	Hegerberg 14', 38', 45'; Hansen 67'

Åråsen Stadion, Lillestrøm
Attendance: 2,453
Referee: Marte Sørø (Malmefjorden)
