= 2012 in Norwegian football =

Football in Norway
- Season: 2012

Men's football
- Tippeligaen: Molde
- 1. divisjon: Start
- 2. divisjon: Elverum (Group 1); Kristiansund (Group 2); Vard Haugesund (Group 3); Follo (Group 4)
- Cupen: Hødd

Women's football
- Toppserien: LSK Kvinner
- 1. divisjon: Avaldsnes
- Cupen: Stabæk

The 2012 season was the 107th season of competitive football in Norway.

The season began on 25 March 2012 for Tippeligaen, with 1. divisjon started 9 April 2012. First round of 2. divisjon was scheduled to 14 April 2012. 1. divisjon ended on 11 October 2012, while Tippeligaen finished on 18 November 2012. The Cup Final was played on 25 November 2012.

== Men's football ==
=== Promotion and relegation ===
| League | Promoted to league | Relegated from league |
|---|---|---|
| Tippeligaen | Sandnes Ulf; Hønefoss | Start; Sarpsborg 08 |
| 1. divisjon | Ull/Kisa; Bærum; Notodden; Tromsdalen | Asker; Nybergsund-Trysil; Randaberg; Løv-Ham |
| 2. divisjon | Østsiden; Gjøvik FF; Grorud; Birkebeineren; Jerv; Egersund; Brann 2; Fana; Træff; Buvik; Mo; Finnsnes | Tiller; Strindheim; Steinkjer; Herd; Jevnaker; Manglerud Star; Viking 2; Førde; Austevoll; Harstad; Hasle-Løren; Skarp |

=== League season ===
==== Tippeligaen ====
| Pos | Team | Pld | W | D | L | GF | GA | GD | Pts | Qualification or relegation |
|---|---|---|---|---|---|---|---|---|---|---|
| 1 | Molde (C) | 30 | 19 | 5 | 6 | 51 | 31 | +20 | 62 | Qualification for the Champions League second qualifying round |
| 2 | Strømsgodset | 30 | 17 | 7 | 6 | 62 | 40 | +22 | 58 | Qualification for the Europa League second qualifying round (Note: Hødd, which played in the 2012 First Division, also qualified for the 2013–14 UEFA Europa League second qualifying round as winners of the 2012 Norwegian Cup.) |
| 3 | Rosenborg | 30 | 15 | 10 | 5 | 53 | 26 | +27 | 55 | Qualification for the Europa League first qualifying round (Note: Tromsø qualified for the first qualifying round of the UEFA Europa League via the UEFA Fair Play ranking.) |
| 4 | Tromsø | 30 | 14 | 7 | 9 | 45 | 32 | +13 | 49 | Qualification for the Europa League first qualifying round |
| 5 | Viking | 30 | 14 | 7 | 9 | 41 | 36 | +5 | 49 | |
| 6 | Brann | 30 | 13 | 3 | 14 | 57 | 50 | +7 | 42 | |
| 7 | Haugesund | 30 | 11 | 9 | 10 | 46 | 40 | +6 | 42 | |
| 8 | Vålerenga | 30 | 12 | 5 | 13 | 42 | 44 | −2 | 41 | |
| 9 | Lillestrøm | 30 | 9 | 12 | 9 | 46 | 47 | −1 | 39 | |
| 10 | Odd Grenland | 30 | 11 | 7 | 12 | 40 | 43 | −3 | 39 (Note: Odd Grenland were deducted 1 point for lack of financial control) | |
| 11 | Aalesund | 30 | 9 | 11 | 10 | 40 | 41 | −1 | 38 | |
| 12 | Sogndal | 30 | 8 | 10 | 12 | 29 | 37 | −8 | 34 | |
| 13 | Hønefoss | 30 | 7 | 12 | 11 | 30 | 42 | −12 | 33 | |
| 14 | Sandnes Ulf (O) | 30 | 8 | 8 | 14 | 44 | 56 | −12 | 32 | Qualification for the relegation play-offs |
| 15 | Fredrikstad (R) | 30 | 9 | 3 | 18 | 42 | 59 | −17 | 30 | Relegation to First Division |
| 16 | Stabæk (R) | 30 | 5 | 2 | 23 | 25 | 69 | −44 | 17 | Relegation to First Division |

Source: fotball.no
Rules for classification: 1) points; 2) goal difference; 3) number of goals scored.
(C) Champions; (O) Play-off winners; (R) Relegated

==== 1. divisjon ====
| Pos | Team | Pld | W | D | L | GF | GA | GD | Pts | Promotion or relegation |
|---|---|---|---|---|---|---|---|---|---|---|
| 1 | Start (C, P) | 30 | 20 | 6 | 4 | 71 | 35 | +36 | 66 | Promotion to Tippeligaen |
| 2 | Sarpsborg 08 (P) | 30 | 19 | 6 | 5 | 73 | 43 | +30 | 63 | Promotion to Tippeligaen |
| 3 | Sandefjord | 30 | 16 | 7 | 7 | 44 | 29 | +15 | 55 | Qualification for the promotion play-offs |
| 4 | Mjøndalen | 30 | 16 | 7 | 7 | 52 | 43 | +9 | 55 | Qualification for the promotion play-offs |
| 5 | Bodø/Glimt | 30 | 13 | 9 | 8 | 59 | 36 | +23 | 48 | Qualification for the promotion play-offs |
| 6 | Ullensaker/Kisa | 30 | 14 | 2 | 14 | 45 | 39 | +6 | 44 | Qualification for the promotion play-offs |
| 7 | Ranheim | 30 | 11 | 10 | 9 | 55 | 40 | +15 | 43 | |
| 8 | HamKam (Note: HamKam were deducted 2 points for lack of financial control) | 30 | 13 | 6 | 11 | 51 | 49 | +2 | 43 | |
| 9 | Kongsvinger | 30 | 12 | 3 | 15 | 44 | 48 | −4 | 39 | |
| 10 | Bryne | 30 | 10 | 8 | 12 | 41 | 53 | −12 | 38 | |
| 11 | Strømmen | 30 | 10 | 7 | 13 | 39 | 51 | −12 | 37 | |
| 12 | Hødd | 30 | 10 | 5 | 15 | 43 | 52 | −9 | 35 | Qualification for the Europa League second qualifying round (Note: Hødd qualified for the second qualifying round of the UEFA Europa League as winners of the 2012 Norwegian Cup.) |
| 13 | Tromsdalen (R) | 30 | 10 | 5 | 15 | 51 | 62 | −11 | 35 | Relegation to Second Division |
| 14 | Bærum (R) | 30 | 5 | 7 | 18 | 49 | 73 | −24 | 22 | Relegation to Second Division |
| 15 | Notodden (R) | 30 | 6 | 4 | 20 | 38 | 71 | −33 | 22 | Relegation to Second Division |
| 16 | Alta (Note: Alta were deducted 1 point for lack of financial control) (R) | 30 | 4 | 10 | 16 | 30 | 61 | −31 | 21 | Relegation to Second Division |

Source: nifs.no
Rules for classification: 1) points; 2) goal difference; 3) number of goals scored.
(C) Champions; (P) Promoted; (R) Relegated

==== 2. divisjon ====
===== Group 1 =====
| Pos | Team | Pld | W | D | L | GF | GA | GD | Pts | Promotion or relegation |
|---|---|---|---|---|---|---|---|---|---|---|
| 1 | Elverum (P) | 26 | 14 | 9 | 3 | 57 | 30 | +27 | 51 | Promotion to First Division |
| 2 | Raufoss | 26 | 13 | 7 | 6 | 54 | 26 | +28 | 46 | |
| 3 | Nybergsund-Trysil | 26 | 13 | 5 | 8 | 49 | 32 | +17 | 44 | |
| 4 | Birkebeineren | 26 | 13 | 4 | 9 | 50 | 46 | +4 | 43 | |
| 5 | Strømsgodset 2 | 26 | 11 | 5 | 10 | 57 | 68 | −11 | 38 | |
| 6 | Fram Larvik | 26 | 10 | 6 | 10 | 39 | 37 | +2 | 36 | |
| 7 | Valdres | 26 | 10 | 6 | 10 | 38 | 40 | −2 | 36 | |
| 8 | Gjøvik | 26 | 9 | 9 | 8 | 38 | 43 | −5 | 36 | |
| 9 | Vålerenga 2 | 26 | 9 | 6 | 11 | 44 | 43 | +1 | 33 | |
| 10 | Grorud | 26 | 7 | 11 | 8 | 44 | 40 | +4 | 32 | |
| 11 | Tønsberg (Note: Tønsberg were deducted 2 point for using an illegal player. This was reduced to 1 point on appeal.) | 26 | 10 | 3 | 13 | 32 | 52 | −20 | 32 | |
| 12 | Ørn-Horten (R) | 26 | 8 | 4 | 14 | 42 | 50 | −8 | 28 | Relegation to Third Division |
| 13 | Lillehammer (R) | 26 | 6 | 10 | 10 | 42 | 54 | −12 | 28 | Relegation to Third Division |
| 14 | Brumunddal (R) | 26 | 3 | 7 | 16 | 29 | 54 | −25 | 16 | Relegation to Third Division |

Source: nifs.no
Rules for classification: 1) points; 2) goal difference; 3) number of goals scored.
(P) Promoted; (R) Relegated

===== Group 2 =====
| Pos | Team | Pld | W | D | L | GF | GA | GD | Pts | Promotion or relegation |
|---|---|---|---|---|---|---|---|---|---|---|
| 1 | Kristiansund (P) | 26 | 22 | 2 | 2 | 77 | 18 | +59 | 68 | Promotion to First Division |
| 2 | Nardo | 26 | 15 | 5 | 6 | 58 | 42 | +16 | 50 | |
| 3 | Fyllingsdalen | 26 | 14 | 5 | 7 | 51 | 37 | +14 | 47 | |
| 4 | Byåsen | 26 | 14 | 5 | 7 | 57 | 47 | +10 | 47 | |
| 5 | Kjelsås | 26 | 14 | 2 | 10 | 58 | 48 | +10 | 44 | |
| 6 | Rosenborg 2 | 26 | 11 | 5 | 10 | 63 | 50 | +13 | 38 | |
| 7 | KFUM Oslo | 26 | 11 | 5 | 10 | 48 | 49 | −1 | 38 | |
| 8 | Levanger | 26 | 10 | 4 | 12 | 53 | 48 | +5 | 34 | |
| 9 | Træff | 26 | 8 | 8 | 10 | 51 | 50 | +1 | 32 | |
| 10 | Molde 2 | 26 | 9 | 5 | 12 | 65 | 67 | −2 | 32 | |
| 11 | Fana | 26 | 8 | 6 | 12 | 54 | 52 | +2 | 30 | |
| 12 | Skeid (R) | 26 | 7 | 5 | 14 | 42 | 55 | −13 | 26 | Relegation to Third Division |
| 13 | Buvik (R) | 26 | 4 | 4 | 18 | 41 | 88 | −47 | 16 | Relegation to Third Division |
| 14 | Aalesund 2 (R) | 26 | 4 | 1 | 21 | 25 | 92 | −67 | 13 | Relegation to Third Division |

Source: nifs.no
Rules for classification: 1) points; 2) goal difference; 3) number of goals scored.
(P) Promoted; (R) Relegated

===== Group 3 =====
| Pos | Team | Pld | W | D | L | GF | GA | GD | Pts | Promotion or relegation |
|---|---|---|---|---|---|---|---|---|---|---|
| 1 | Vard Haugesund (P) | 26 | 15 | 8 | 3 | 60 | 26 | +34 | 53 | Promotion to First Division |
| 2 | Flekkerøy | 26 | 14 | 4 | 8 | 53 | 30 | +23 | 46 | |
| 3 | Åsane | 26 | 11 | 7 | 8 | 46 | 44 | +2 | 40 | |
| 4 | Nest-Sotra | 26 | 12 | 3 | 11 | 50 | 47 | +3 | 39 | |
| 5 | Vidar | 26 | 10 | 8 | 8 | 42 | 42 | 0 | 38 | |
| 6 | Ålgård | 26 | 11 | 5 | 10 | 36 | 48 | −12 | 38 | |
| 7 | Brann 2 | 26 | 11 | 4 | 11 | 60 | 63 | −3 | 37 | |
| 8 | Pors Grenland | 26 | 10 | 6 | 10 | 40 | 36 | +4 | 36 | |
| 9 | Vindbjart | 26 | 9 | 8 | 9 | 56 | 47 | +9 | 35 | |
| 10 | Egersund | 26 | 9 | 8 | 9 | 46 | 45 | +1 | 35 | |
| 11 | Odd Grenland 2 | 26 | 10 | 3 | 13 | 39 | 47 | −8 | 33 | |
| 12 | Jerv (R) | 26 | 9 | 5 | 12 | 45 | 53 | −8 | 32 | Relegation to Third Division |
| 13 | Mandalskameratene (R) | 26 | 6 | 6 | 14 | 46 | 72 | −26 | 24 | Relegation to Third Division |
| 14 | Randaberg (R) | 26 | 6 | 3 | 17 | 31 | 49 | −18 | 21 | Relegation to Third Division |

Source: nifs.no
Rules for classification: 1) points; 2) goal difference; 3) number of goals scored.
(P) Promoted; (R) Relegated

===== Group 4 =====
| Pos | Team | Pld | W | D | L | GF | GA | GD | Pts | Promotion or relegation |
|---|---|---|---|---|---|---|---|---|---|---|
| 1 | Follo (P) | 26 | 18 | 2 | 6 | 58 | 28 | +30 | 56 | Promotion to First Division |
| 2 | Lørenskog | 26 | 16 | 3 | 7 | 51 | 39 | +12 | 51 | |
| 3 | Senja | 26 | 15 | 5 | 6 | 54 | 44 | +10 | 50 | |
| 4 | Asker | 26 | 14 | 5 | 7 | 54 | 36 | +18 | 47 | |
| 5 | Kvik Halden | 26 | 11 | 6 | 9 | 53 | 40 | +13 | 39 | |
| 6 | Østsiden | 26 | 12 | 3 | 11 | 45 | 43 | +2 | 39 | |
| 7 | Nesodden | 26 | 9 | 7 | 10 | 39 | 47 | −8 | 34 | |
| 8 | Frigg | 26 | 9 | 5 | 12 | 53 | 58 | −5 | 32 | |
| 9 | Mo | 26 | 9 | 4 | 13 | 41 | 49 | −8 | 31 | |
| 10 | Moss | 26 | 8 | 6 | 12 | 42 | 46 | −4 | 30 | |
| 11 | Tromsø 2 | 26 | 8 | 3 | 15 | 35 | 48 | −13 | 27 | |
| 12 | Mjølner (R) | 26 | 7 | 6 | 13 | 26 | 41 | −15 | 27 | Relegation to Third Division |
| 13 | Finnsnes (R) | 26 | 8 | 3 | 15 | 35 | 51 | −16 | 27 | Relegation to Third Division |
| 14 | Stabæk 2 (R) | 26 | 8 | 2 | 16 | 36 | 52 | −16 | 26 | Relegation to Third Division |

Source: nifs.no
Rules for classification: 1) points; 2) goal difference; 3) number of goals scored.
(P) Promoted; (R) Relegated

=== Norwegian Football Cup ===
==== Final ====
25 November 2012
13:15 CET (UTC+1)

| Hødd | 1–1 (a.e.t.) | Tromsø |
|---|---|---|
| Sellin 62' | Report | Ciss 87' |
Penalties
| Latifu (penalty scored); Nilsen (penalty scored); Helland (penalty scored); Sandal (penalty missed); Rekdal (penalty scored) | 4–2 | (penalty scored) Årst; (penalty scored) Drage; (penalty missed) Johansen; (penalty missed) Ciss |

Ullevaal Stadion, Oslo
Attendance: 24,217
Referee: Kjetil Sælen (Arna-Bjørnar)

== Women's football ==
=== League season ===
==== Toppserien ====
| Pos | Team | Pld | W | D | L | GF | GA | GD | Pts | Qualification or relegation |
|---|---|---|---|---|---|---|---|---|---|---|
| 1 | LSK Kvinner (C) | 22 | 18 | 2 | 2 | 66 | 17 | +49 | 56 | Qualification for the Champions League round of 32 |
| 2 | Stabæk | 22 | 15 | 5 | 2 | 70 | 21 | +49 | 50 | |
| 3 | Arna-Bjørnar | 22 | 14 | 5 | 3 | 61 | 21 | +40 | 47 | |
| 4 | Røa | 22 | 15 | 4 | 3 | 58 | 19 | +39 | 47 (Note: Røa were deducted 2 point because of lack of financial control.) | |
| 5 | Kolbotn | 22 | 9 | 7 | 6 | 36 | 35 | +1 | 34 | |
| 6 | Sandviken | 22 | 9 | 2 | 11 | 45 | 51 | −6 | 29 | |
| 7 | Klepp | 22 | 7 | 5 | 10 | 41 | 41 | 0 | 26 | |
| 8 | Vålerenga | 22 | 6 | 5 | 11 | 27 | 47 | −20 | 23 | |
| 9 | Trondheims-Ørn | 22 | 6 | 3 | 13 | 29 | 50 | −21 | 21 | |
| 10 | Amazon Grimstad | 22 | 5 | 5 | 12 | 25 | 35 | −10 | 20 | |
| 11 | Kattem (Note: Kattem withdrew their team after the season ended and Fart were offered their place in the 2013 Toppserien, but declined. Instead, Medkila were awarded a spot in the 2013 Toppserien season.) (O) | 22 | 5 | 3 | 14 | 34 | 56 | −22 | 15 (Note: Kattem were deducted 3 point because of license of act plan.) | Qualification for the relegation play-offs |
| 12 | Fart (R) | 22 | 0 | 0 | 22 | 9 | 108 | −99 | 0 | Relegation to First Division |

Source: NIFS
Rules for classification: (1) points; (2) goal difference; (3) number of goals scored.
(C) Champions; (O) Play-off winners; (R) Relegated

=== Norwegian Women's Cup ===
==== Final ====
- Røa 0–4 Stabæk

== Men's UEFA competitions ==
These are the results of Norway's teams in European competitions during the 2012 season. (Norway team score displayed first)

| Team | Contest | Round | Opponent | 1st leg score* | 2nd leg score** | Aggregate score |
|---|---|---|---|---|---|---|
| Molde | UEFA Champions League | Second qualifying round | (Latvia) Ventspils | 3–0 (H) | 1–1 (A) | W 4–1 |
| Molde | UEFA Champions League | Third qualifying round | (Switzerland) Basel | 0–1 (H) | 1–1 (A) | L 1–2 |
| Molde | UEFA Europa League | Play-off round | (Netherlands) Heerenveen | 2–0 (H) | 2–1 (A) | W 4–1 |
| Aalesund | UEFA Europa League | Second qualifying round | (Albania) Tirana | 1–1 (A) | 5–0 (H) | W 6–1 |
| Aalesund | UEFA Europa League | Third qualifying round | (Cyprus) APOEL | 1–2 (A) | 0–1 (H) | L 1–3 |
| Tromsø | UEFA Europa League | Second qualifying round | (Slovenia) Olimpija Ljubljana | 0–0 (A) | 1–0 (H) (aet) | W 1–0 |
| Tromsø | UEFA Europa League | Third qualifying round | (Ukraine) Metalurh Donetsk | 1–1 (H) | 1–0 (A) | W 2–1 |
| Tromsø | UEFA Europa League | Play-off round | (Serbia) Partizan | 3–2 (H) | 0–1 (A) | L 3–3 |
| Rosenborg | UEFA Europa League | First qualifying round | (Northern Ireland) Crusaders | 3–0 (A) | 1–0 (H) | W 4–0 |
| Rosenborg | UEFA Europa League | Second qualifying round | (Kazakhstan) Ordabasy | 2–2 (H) | 2–1 (A) | W 4–3 |
| Rosenborg | UEFA Europa League | Third qualifying round | (Switzerland) Servette | 1–1 (A) | 0–0 (H) | W 1–1 |
| Rosenborg | UEFA Europa League | Play-off round | (Poland) Legia Warsaw | 1–1 (A) | 2–1 (H) | W 3–2 |
| Stabæk | UEFA Europa League | First qualifying round | (Finland) JJK | 0–2 (A) | 3–2 (H) | L 3–4 |

* For group games in Champions League or Europa League, score in home game is displayed
** For group games in Champions League or Europa League, score in away game is displayed

== UEFA Women's Champions League ==
=== Knockout stage ===
==== Round of 32 ====
| Team 1 | Agg. | Team 2 | 1st leg | 2nd leg |
|---|---|---|---|---|
| Stabæk (Norway) | 5–3 | (Denmark) Brøndby | 2–0 | 3–3 |
| BIIK Kazygurt (Kazakhstan) | 0–8 | (Norway) Røa | 0–4 | 0–4 |

==== Round of 16 ====
| Team 1 | Agg. | Team 2 | 1st leg | 2nd leg |
|---|---|---|---|---|
| Wolfsburg (Germany) | 5–2 | (Norway) Røa | 4–1 | 1–1 |
| Stabæk (Norway) | 1–2 | (France) Juvisy | 0–0 | 1–2 |

== National teams ==
=== Norway men's national football team ===
==== 2014 FIFA World Cup qualification (UEFA) ====
The Norway national football team played four games in the qualification for 2014 FIFA World Cup.

===== Group E =====
| 7 September 2012 | Iceland | 2–0 | Norway | Reykjavík, Iceland |
| 18:45 UTC±0 | Árnason 21'; Finnbogason 81' | Report | | Stadium: Laugardalsvöllur; Attendance: 8,352; Referee: Anthony Gautier (France) |

| 11 September 2012 | Norway | 2–1 | Slovenia | Oslo, Norway |
| 20:00 UTC+2 | Henriksen 26'; J. A. Riise 90+4' (pen.) | Report | Šuler 16' | Stadium: Ullevaal Stadion; Attendance: 11,168; Referee: Fırat Aydınus (Turkey) |

| 12 October 2012 | Switzerland | 1–1 | Norway | Bern, Switzerland |
| 20:30 UTC+2 | Gavranović 79' | Report | Hangeland 81' | Stadium: Stade de Suisse; Attendance: 30,712; Referee: David Fernández Borbalán (Spain) |

| 16 October 2012 | Cyprus | 1–3 | Norway | Larnaca, Cyprus |
| 21:00 UTC+3 | Aloneftis 42' | Report | Hangeland 45'; Elyounoussi 81' (pen.); King 83' | Stadium: Antonis Papadopoulos Stadium; Attendance: 2,493; Referee: Paweł Gil (Poland) |

==== Friendlies ====
Norway will also participate in a number of friendly matches.

| 15 January 2012 | Denmark League XI | 1–1 | Norway | Bangkok, Thailand |
| 16:10 UTC+7 | Makienok 71' | Report | Elyounoussi 79' | Stadium: Rajamangala Stadium; Attendance: 3,000; Referee: Mongkolchasi Petsri (Thailand) |

| 18 January 2012 | Thailand | 0–1 | Norway | Bangkok, Thailand |
| 19:00 UTC+7 | | Report | Reginiussen 84' | Stadium: Rajamangala Stadium; Attendance: 6,000; Referee: Yadai Yamamoto (Japan) |

| 21 January 2012 | South Korea U-23 | 3–0 | Norway | Bangkok, Thailand |
| 16:30 UTC+7 | Kim Bo-Kyung 16' (pen.); Kim Hyun-Sung 20'; Seo Jung-Jin 59' | Report | | Stadium: Rajamangala Stadium; Referee: Chaiya Mahapab (Thailand) |

| 29 February 2012 | Northern Ireland | 0–3 | Norway | Belfast (Northern Ireland) |
| 20:45CET | | Report | Nordtveit 44'; Elyounoussi 88'; Ruud 90+3' | Stadium: Windsor Park |

| 26 May 2012 | Norway | 0–1 | England | Oslo, Norway |
| 20:45 CEST | | Report | Young 9' | Stadium: Ullevaal Stadion; Attendance: 21,496; Referee: Michael Weiner (Germany) |

| 2 June 2012 | Norway | 1–1 | Croatia | Oslo, Norway |
| 19:00 CEST | Elyounoussi 90' | Report | da Silva 79' | Stadium: Ullevaal Stadion; Attendance: 14,208; Referee: Sergey Karasev (Russia) |

| 15 August 2012 | Norway | 2–3 | Greece | Oslo, Norway |
| 20:00 CEST | Hangeland 13'; Riise 75' | Report | Torosidis 7'; Papadopoulos 11'; Mitroglou 56' | Stadium: Ullevaal Stadion; Attendance: 13,680; Referee: Alan Kelly (Ireland) |

| 14 November 2012 | Hungary | 0–2 | Norway | Budapest, Hungary |
| 20:30 | | Report | Nielsen 38'; Abdellaoue 79' | Stadium: Ferenc Puscás Stadium; Attendance: 15,000; Referee: Marijo Strahonja (Croatia) |

== Managerial changes ==
| Name | Club | Date of departure | Replacement | Date of appointment |
|---|---|---|---|---|
| Harald Aabrekk | Sogndal | 31 December 2011 | Jonas Olsson | 1 January 2012 |
| Petter Belsvik; Magnus Powell | Lillestrøm | 31 December 2011 | Magnus Haglund | 1 January 2012 |
| Thomas Berntsen | Strømmen | 31 December 2011 | Erland Johnsen | 1 January 2012 |
| Jörgen Lennartsson | Stabæk | 31 December 2011 | Petter Belsvik | 2 January 2012 |
| Tom Freddy Aune | Fredrikstad | 10 May 2012 | Trond Amundsen | 10 May 2012 |

== Events of the season ==
=== February ===
20 February 2011: Knut Torbjørn Eggen, the coach of the U-19 team and formerly head coach of Moss and Fredrikstad passes away at the age of 51.

=== March ===
23 March 2012: In the opening match of Tippeligaen, Molde wins 2–1 at home against Strømsgodset.

25 March 2012: Sogndal beats Odd Grenland 4–0, and is on top of the table for the first time in history.

=== April ===
1 April 2012: In Haugesund's 2–0 win against Molde, Alexander Søderlund's goal was never across the line and the debate about goal-line technology is again raised.

9 April 2012: Sogndal collect their first point against Rosenborg at Lerkendal Stadion, having lost the first 13 meetings at Lerkendal. In the opening match of Adeccoligaen, the two teams relegated from Tippeligaen, Start and Sarpsborg 08 draws 4–4.

15 April 2012: Sogndal's goalkeeper Kenneth Udjus surpasses Rosenborg's Daniel Örlund as the goalkeeper with the longest clean sheet since 1991. Udjus' new record is 558 minutes, while Örlund's clean sheet lasted for 553 minutes.

=== September ===
16 September 2012: Kristiansund BK secures promotion to the 1. divisjon after winning the 2012 2. divisjon group 2.
