= Ingrid Moe Wold =

Norwegian footballer (born 1990)

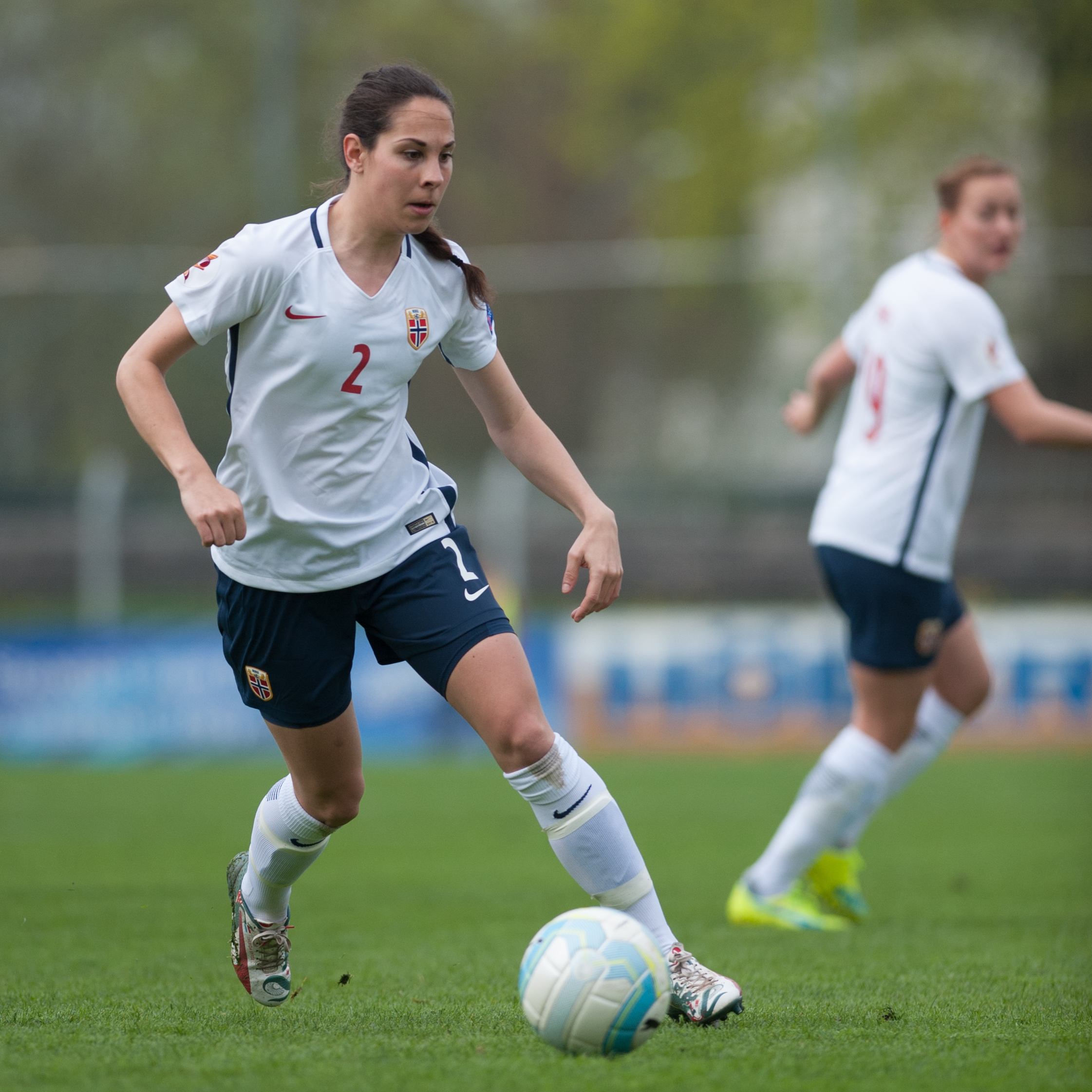
- Moe Wold representing Norway in April 2016

Personal information
- Date of birth: 29 January 1990 (age 36)
- Place of birth: Gjøvik, Norway
- Height: 1.64 m (5 ft 5 in)
- Position: Defender

Team information
- Current team: Everton
- Number: 2

Senior career*
Years	Team	Apps	(Gls)
2009–2019	LSK Kvinner	231	(29)
2020	Madrid CFF	8	(0)
2020–2021	Everton	21	(0)
Total		260	(29)

International career^{‡}
2012–2021	Norway	70	(3)
- * Club domestic league appearances and goals as of 18 May 2021 ‡ National team caps and goals as of 9 November 2019

Ingrid Moe Wold (born 29 January 1990) is a Norwegian former professional footballer who played as a defender.

A legend of LSK Kvinner, Moe Wold spent 10 years at the club, winning seven league titles, before moving to Madrid CFF in 2020. She later joined Everton, spending a season with the club before retiring to become a physiotherapist. She played in the UEFA Women's Champions League, and was part of the Norway squads at two World Cups, and one Euros.

== Club career ==
=== LSK Kvinner ===
Moe Wold joined Norwegian club LSK Kvinner in 2009. Over ten years at the club, she played 283 games in all competitions, scoring 38 goals and being appointed captain. In December 2019, it was announced that she's leaving the club, for the opportunity to play overseas. During her time at the club, she won 7 Toppseriens and 5 Norwegian Women's Cups.

=== Madrid CFF ===
In January 2020, Moe Wold joined Spanish club Madrid CFF. She played her last match for the club on 1 March against Barcelona, before travelling back to Norway for a weekend off. This meant she missed the Covid lockdown in Spain, and was instead in quarantine in Norway. Following a season which was halted due to the COVID-19 pandemic in Spain, Moe Wold was released by the club, along with 11 other players, in June 2020.

=== Everton ===
In July 2020, Moe Wold joined Everton on a two-year deal. She made her debut in Everton's first game of the season, a 4–0 victory over Bristol City. In May 2021, Moe Wold announced that she will retire at the end of the 2020–21 FA WSL season, to pursue a career in physiotherapy. She appeared in 21 league matches during her time at Everton.

== International career ==
Moe Wold made her senior debut for Norway against Sweden on 17 January 2012. She scored her first international goal against Denmark on 11 March 2015, scoring in the 65th minute.

On 13 May 2015, Moe Wold was called up to the Norway squad for the 2015 FIFA Women's World Cup.

On 28 June 2017, Moe Wold was called up to the Norway squad for the UEFA Women's Euro 2017.

On 2 May 2019, Moe Wold was called up to the Norway squad for the 2019 FIFA Women's World Cup.

== Career statistics ==
As of 6 March 2021

Club	Season	Division	League		Cup^{1}		Continental^{2}		Total	
Club	Season	Division	Apps	Goals	Apps	Goals	Apps	Goals	Apps	Goals
LSK Kvinner	2009	Toppserien	14	1	0	0	-		14	1
LSK Kvinner	2010	Toppserien	22	3	0	0	-		22	3
LSK Kvinner	2011	Toppserien	22	7	1	0	-		23	7
LSK Kvinner	2012	Toppserien	22	3	2	2	-		24	5
LSK Kvinner	2013	Toppserien	22	3	3	1	2	0	27	4
LSK Kvinner	2014	Toppserien	22	3	5	1	-		27	4
LSK Kvinner	2015	Toppserien	22	1	5	2	4	0	31	3
LSK Kvinner	2016	Toppserien	22	3	5	1	2	0	29	4
LSK Kvinner	2017	Toppserien	22	1	4	1	4	0	30	2
LSK Kvinner	2018	Toppserien	20	2	4	1	4	0	28	3
LSK Kvinner	2019	Toppserien	21	2	3	0	2	0	26	2
LSK Kvinner	Total		231	29	32	9	18	0	281	38
Madrid	2019–20	Primera División	8	0	2	0	-		10	0
Madrid	Total		8	0	2	0	-	-	10	0
Everton	2020–21	FA WSL	14	0	3	0	-		17	0
Everton	Total		14	0	3	0	-	-	17	0
Career total			253	29	37	9	18	0	308	38

== Honours ==
LSK Kvinner FK

- Toppserien (7): 2012, 2014, 2015, 2016, 2017, 2018, 2019
- Norwegian Women's Cup (5): 2014, 2015, 2016, 2018, 2019
