= Amalie Eikeland =

Norwegian footballer (born 1995)

- Amalie Eikeland in 2026

Personal information
- Full name: Amalie Vevle Eikeland
- Date of birth: 26 August 1995 (age 31)
- Place of birth: Norway
- Height: 1.64 m (5 ft 5 in)
- Position: Forward

Team information
- Current team: Brann
- Number: 9

Youth career
- Arna-Bjørnar

Senior career*
Years	Team	Apps	(Gls)
2011–2018	Arna-Bjørnar	166	(44)
2019	Sandviken	11	(1)
2019–2023	Reading	77	(7)
2023–	Brann	53	(23)

International career^{‡}
2010	Norway U15	1	(0)
2011	Norway U16	9	(7)
2012	Norway U17	4	(2)
2012–2014	Norway U19	23	(7)
2014–2018	Norway U23	18	(3)
2016–	Norway	47	(3)
- * Club domestic league appearances and goals as of 6 September 2025 ‡ National team caps and goals as of 31 January 2024

Amalie Vevle Eikeland (born 26 August 1995) is a Norwegian professional footballer who plays for Brann and the Norway national team.

== Personal life ==
Eikeland was born in Bergen on 26 August 1995.

== Club career ==
Eikeland played for the club Arna-Bjørnar from 2011 to 2018, and for IL Sandviken in 2019.

On 8 August 2019, Eikeland signed for FA WSL club Reading. On 21 May 2023, Eikeland played her 100th game for Reading, becoming the sixth player to do so in the process. On 29 June 2023, Reading announced the departure of Eikeland following their relegation to the Women's Championship. The day after, Brann announced that they had signed her. Brann was formerly known as Sandviken, which Eikeland played for before she signed for Reading.

== International career ==
Eikeland was selected to represent Norway at the 2019 FIFA Women's World Cup.

On 19 June 2023, she was included in the 23-player Norwegian squad for the FIFA Women's World Cup 2023.

== Career statistics ==
=== Club ===
As of match played 7 June 2025

Appearances and goals by club, season and competition
Club	Season	League			National Cup		League Cup		Continental		Total	
Club	Season	Division	Apps	Goals	Apps	Goals	Apps	Goals	Apps	Goals	Apps	Goals
Arna-Bjørnar	2019	Toppserien	17	3	1	0	-		-		18	3
Arna-Bjørnar	2012	Toppserien	21	11	4	2	-		-		25	13
Arna-Bjørnar	2013	Toppserien	22	6	3	0	-		-		25	6
Arna-Bjørnar	2014	Toppserien	18	2	1	0	-		-		19	2
Arna-Bjørnar	2015	Toppserien	22	3	2	0	-		-		24	3
Arna-Bjørnar	2016	Toppserien	22	5	2	1	-		-		24	6
Arna-Bjørnar	2017	Toppserien	22	5	3	0	-		-		25	5
Arna-Bjørnar	2018	Toppserien	22	9	2	0	-		-		24	9
Arna-Bjørnar	Total		166	44	18	3	-	-	-	-	184	47
Sandviken	2019	Toppserien	11	1	1	1	-		-		12	2
Reading	2019–20	FA WSL	14	2	2	0	6	0	-		22	2
Reading	2020–21	FA WSL	22	2	1	0	3	1	-		26	3
Reading	2021–22	FA WSL	20	2	2	0	3	0	-		25	2
Reading	2022–23	FA WSL	21	1	3	0	3	0	-		27	1
Reading	Total		77	7	8	0	15	1	-	-	100	8
Brann	2023	Toppserien	10	5	1	0	-		4	2	15	7
Brann	2024	Toppserien	25	10	3	2	-		8	1	36	13
Brann	2025	Toppserien	12	6	1	1	-		0	0	13	7
Brann	Total		47	21	5	3	0	0	12	3	64	27
Career total			301	73	32	7	15	1	12	3	360	84

=== International ===
As of match played on 26 September 2023

Appearances and goals by national team and year
National team	Year	Apps	Goals
Norway	2016	2	0
Norway	2017	0	0
Norway	2018	0	0
Norway	2019	10	3
Norway	2020	4	0
Norway	2021	10	0
Norway	2022	14	0
Norway	2023	7	0
Total		47	3

Scores and results list Norways's goal tally first, score column indicates score after each Norway goal.
As of match played on 30 August 2019

List of international goals scored by Amalie Eikeland
No.	Date	Venue	Opponent	Score	Result	Competition	Ref.
1	30 August 2019	Seaview, Belfast, Northern Ireland	Northern Ireland	5–0	6–0	UEFA Women's Euro 2022 qualifying	
2	30 August 2019	Seaview, Belfast, Northern Ireland	Northern Ireland	6–0	6–0	UEFA Women's Euro 2022 qualifying	
3	17 August 2014	Tórsvøllur, Tórshavn, Faroe Islands	Faroe Islands	3–0	13–0	UEFA Women's Euro 2022 qualifying	

== Honours ==
=== International ===
Norway

- Algarve cup: 2019

=== Individual ===
- Reading - Player of the Season: 2021–22
- Reading - Players' Player of the Season: 2021–22
