= 2008 Toppserien =

Toppserien
- Season: 2008
- Champions: Røa; 3rd title
- Relegated: Larvik; Fart
- Matches: 132
- Goals: 492 (3.73 per match)
- Top goalscorer: (England) Kristy Moore (20 goals)

The 2008 season of the Toppserien, the highest women's football (soccer) league in Norway, began on 12 April 2008 and ended on 2 November 2008.

22 games were played with 3 points given for wins and 1 for draws. Number eleven and twelve were relegated, while the two top teams from the First Division were promoted.

Røa won the league, defending their title. Asker went defunct after the season, but relocated their team to Stabæk.

== League table ==
Pos	Team	Pld	W	D	L	GF	GA	GD	Pts	Qualification or relegation
1	Røa (C)	22	20	1	1	90	10	+80	61	Qualification for the Champions League round of 32
2	Team Strømmen	22	14	4	4	44	22	+22	46	Qualification for the Champions League qualifying round
3	Asker	22	14	3	5	53	26	+27	45	
4	Kolbotn	22	12	6	4	51	23	+28	42	
5	Arna-Bjørnar	22	12	5	5	58	26	+32	41	
6	Klepp	22	8	7	7	51	30	+21	31	
7	Fløya	22	9	3	10	41	39	+2	30	
8	Amazon Grimstad	22	7	4	11	30	45	−15	25	
9	Trondheims-Ørn	22	6	5	11	26	38	−12	23	
10	Kattem	22	5	2	15	21	67	−46	17	
11	Larvik (R)	22	3	3	16	24	80	−56	12	Relegation to First Division
12	Fart (R)	22	0	1	21	13	86	−73	1	Relegation to First Division

Source: NRK Sport
Rules for classification: 1) points; 2) goal difference; 3) number of goals scored.
(C) Champions; (R) Relegated

== Results ==
Home \ Away	AG	A-B	AFK	FLF	IFF	KAT	KLP	KOL	FKL	RØA	TS	ØRN
Amazon Grimstad	—	2–3	0–2	4–1	2–1	0–1	0–0	0–4	2–0	0–1	4–2	1–1
Arna-Bjørnar	10–1	—	2–1	3–0	2–1	3–0	2–2	1–1	5–0	0–1	1–2	6–1
Asker	3–1	2–1	—	6–1	1–3	3–0	2–1	3–2	7–2	0–3	1–1	0–1
Fart	1–5	0–2	0–7	—	0–1	1–2	3–3	1–3	2–3	0–7	0–2	2–5
Fløya	1–0	2–2	0–0	3–0	—	7–0	0–2	0–4	5–2	1–9	2–2	1–2
Kattem	1–3	0–3	1–3	4–1	0–1	—	1–0	1–1	4–1	0–5	1–4	1–1
Klepp	3–1	1–1	0–1	6–0	4–0	3–1	—	0–0	5–0	0–4	0–4	4–1
Kolbotn	2–2	5–3	2–5	3–0	1–0	5–0	1–1	—	3–0	0–0	2–3	1–0
Larvik	0–0	1–5	2–5	1–0	1–6	3–0	2–4	0–7	—	1–6	1–5	1–2
Røa	5–0	2–1	3–0	12–0	3–2	11–1	3–0	3–1	5–1	—	1–2	4–0
Team Strømmen	2–0	0–1	0–0	1–0	2–1	4–1	2–1	0–2	1–1	0–1	—	1–0
Trondheims-Ørn	1–2	1–1	0–1	3–0	0–3	4–1	1–1	0–1	1–1	0–1	1–4	—

Source: NRK Sport
Legend: Blue = home team win; Yellow = draw; Red = away team win.

== Top goalscorers ==
Rank	Player	Club	Goals
1	(England) Kristy Moore	Fløya	20
2	(Norway) Guro Knutsen	Røa	17
2	(Norway) Lene Mykjåland	Røa	17
4	(Norway) Melissa Wiik	Asker	16
5	(Norway) Lise Klaveness	Asker	14
5	(Norway) Elise Thorsnes	Arna-Bjørnar	14
7	(Norway) Kristin Blystad Bjerke	Kolbotn	13
8	(Norway) Aimee Edris	Arna-Bjørnar	11
8	(England) Una Nwajei	Amazon Grimstad	11
10	(Norway) Hege Hansen	Klepp	10
10	(Norway) Kristin Lie	Trondheims-Ørn	10

== Promotion and relegation ==
- Larvik and Fart were relegated to the First Division.
- Sandviken and Fortuna Ålesund were promoted from the First Division.
