= Elise Thorsnes =

Norwegian footballer (born 1988)

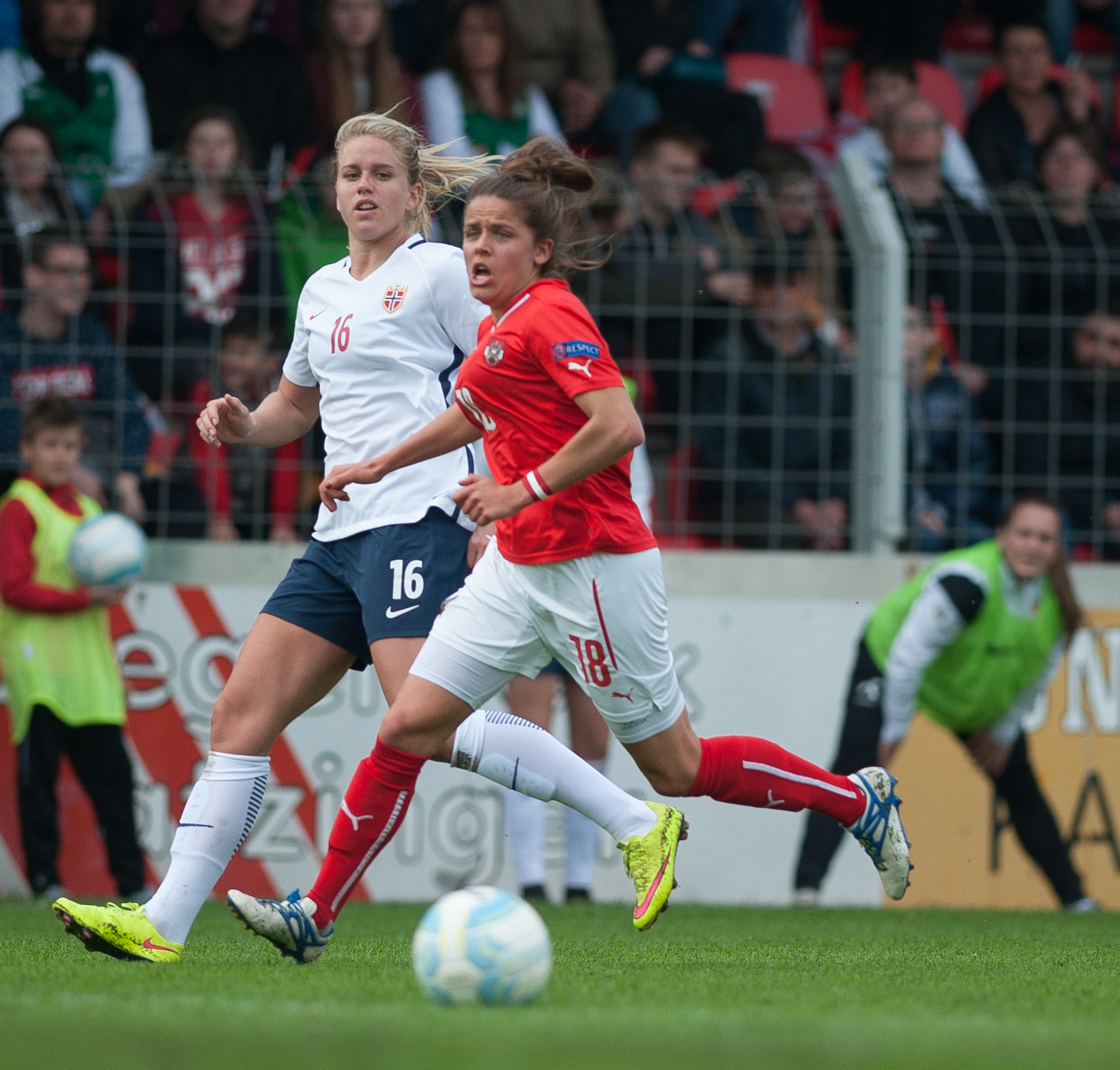
- Thorsnes (left) playing for Norway in 2016

Personal information
- Full name: Elise Hove Thorsnes
- Date of birth: 14 August 1988 (age 38)
- Place of birth: Leikanger, Norway
- Height: 1.74 m (5 ft 8 1/2 in)
- Position: Forward

Senior career*
| Years | Team | Apps | (Gls) |
- Kaupanger
| 2006–2008 | Arna-Bjørnar | 59 | (39) |
| 2009–2012 | Røa | 76 | (60) |
| 2013–2014 | Stabæk | 40 | (31) |
| 2015–2017 | Avaldsnes | 59 | (27) |
| 2017–2018 | Canberra United | 9 | (6) |
| 2018 | Utah Royals | 9 | (0) |
| 2019 | LSK Kvinner | 22 | (12) |
| 2019–2020 | → Canberra United | 10 | (2) |
| 2020 | Avaldsnes | 15 | (8) |
| 2021–2025 | Vålerenga | 99 | (46) |

International career^{‡}
| 2004–2005 | Norway U17 | 8 | (3) |
| 2005–2007 | Norway U19 | 17 | (9) |
| 2008 | Norway U20 | 2 | (0) |
| 2006 | Norway U21 | 3 | (2) |
| 2007–2010 | Norway U23 | 5 | (1) |
| 2006–2022 | Norway | 130 | (21) |
Medal record
Women's football
Representing Norway
UEFA Women's Championship
| Silver medal – second place | 2013 Sweden | Team |
- * Club domestic league appearances and goals as of 17 November 2025 ‡ National team caps and goals as of 23 February 2022

Elise Hove Thorsnes (born 14 August 1988) is a Norwegian former footballer who played as a forward.

== Club career ==
Thorsnes was born in Leikanger Municipality. She made her debut for the former elite team Kaupanger, and stayed there until her debut for Arna-Bjørnar in 2006. Thorsnes made her debut at the same time as Erika Skarbø, Madeleine Giske and Trude Johannessen. Arna-Bjørnar finished in 5th place in 2006. Thorsnes was the top scorer in the Toppserien with 19 goals, and was named Young Player of the Year, and was named to the 2006 Toppserien Team of the Year. The 2007 season was less successful for Thorsnes as she only scored 6 goals and Arna-Bjørnar finished in 4th place.

In the 2008 season Thorsnes scored 14 goals in the Toppserien, she also scored 11 cup goals in 10 cup games. She helped Arna-Bjørnar to a 5th-place finish and scored against all the top teams (apart from Røa). On 12 December, Thorsnes revealed that she would be signing with Røa.

Thorsnes won two championships in her first three seasons in Røa. In 2011, she was the Toppserien's Golden Boot for the second time with 27 goals, a personal record.

Following the 2012 season, Thorsnes signed with Stabæk. In the 2013 season Thorsnes won the Golden Boot for the third time, scoring 19 goals. Stabæk finished in first place in the Toppserien and won the Norwegian Cup.

After two seasons with Stabæk, Thorsnes joined Avaldsnes where she would play for three seasons. In 2017 Thorsnes became the all-time leading goal scorer in the Toppserien.

In October 2017, Thorsnes joined Canberra United for the 2017–18 W-League season, meaning she would play club football outside of Norway for the first time. Thorsnes scored six goals in nine games with Canberra.

On 14 February 2018 Thorsnes signed with the Utah Royals of the NWSL for their inaugural season. This was a disappointing stint for Thorsnes as she only appeared in nine games, and didn't score any goals. After the season ended Utah declined her contract option, she was placed on Re-Entry wires and wasn't claimed by another team.

In November 2018, Thorsnes signed a one-year contract with Toppserien champions LSK Kvinner for the 2019 season. In 2019 Thorsnes went to Canberra United as a guest player for the season, after she is finished there she is going back to her former club Avaldsnes.

== International career ==
In 2006 Thorsnes made her debut for Norway Women's National Team, but she was not included in the squad for the 2007 Women's World Cup. Thorsnes scored her first goal for Norway against Italy at the 2008 Algarve Cup. In 2008 Thorsnes was named to the Norwegian Team for the Beijing Olympics, she appeared in three matches. Norway lost to Brazil in the Quarter-finals.

She scored her second international goal in the Quarter-finals of the 2009 European Championships, helping Norway defeat Sweden 3–1. Thorsnes participated in the 2011 World Cup. She appeared in all three group games for Norway, and scored a goal in Norway's final game, a 2–1 loss to Australia. Norway finished third in their group and did not advance to the knockout round.

At the 2013 European Championships Thorsnes appeared in every game for Norway as they advanced all the way to the Championship game, where they lost to Germany 1–0.

Thorsnes appeared in her second World Cup in 2015. She played in all four games for Norway, who were eliminated in the Round of 16 by England. Norway had a very disappointing European Championship in 2017, as they lost all three group games and failed to score a goal. Thorsnes started two games.

Thorsnes appeared in six games for Norway in the 2019 World Cup Qualification, scoring one goal. Norway won their qualifying group and qualified for the 2019 World Cup.

== International goals ==
List of international goals scored by Elise Thorsnes
| No. | Date | Venue | Opponent | Score | Result | Competition |
|---|---|---|---|---|---|---|
| 1. | 5 March 2008 | Restinga Stadium, Alvor, Portugal | Italy | 1–0 | 4–2 | 2008 Algarve Cup |
| 2. | 25 August 2010 | Goce Delčev Stadium, Prilep, Macedonia | Macedonia | 4–0 | 7–0 | 2011 FIFA Women's World Cup qualification |
| 3. | 2 March 2011 | Municipal Stadium, Lagos, Portugal | Finland | 1–1 | 2–1 | 2011 Algarve Cup |
| 4. | 19 May 2011 | Nadderud Stadion, Bærum, Norway | Finland | 1–0 | 5–1 | Friendly |
| 5. | 19 May 2011 | Nadderud Stadion, Bærum, Norway | Finland | 3–0 | 5–1 | Friendly |
| 6. | 19 May 2011 | Nadderud Stadion, Bærum, Norway | Finland | 5–1 | 5–1 | Friendly |
| 7. | 6 July 2011 | BayArena, Leverkusen, Germany | Australia | 1–0 | 1–2 | 2011 FIFA Women's World Cup |
| 8. | 2 March 2012 | Estádio Municipal, Lagos, Portugal | United States | 1–2 | 1–2 | 2012 Algarve Cup |
| 9. | 15 September 2012 | Ullevaal Stadion, Oslo, Norway | Belgium | 1–0 | 3–2 | UEFA Women's Euro 2013 qualifying |
| 10. | 19 September 2012 | Ullevaal Stadion, Oslo, Norway | Iceland | 2–0 | 2–0 | UEFA Women's Euro 2013 qualifying |
| 11. | 12 January 2013 | Yongchuan Sports Center, Chongqing, China | South Korea | 1–0 | 2–0 | 2013 Four Nations Tournament |
| 12. | 26 October 2013 | Sarpsborg Stadion, Sarpsborg, Norway | Albania | 2–0 | 7–0 | 2015 FIFA Women's World Cup qualification |
| 13. | 14 January 2014 | La Manga Stadium, La Manga, Spain | Spain | 1–1 | 2–1 | Friendly |
| 14. | 13 February 2014 | Komotini Municipal Stadium, Komotini, Greece | Greece | 2–0 | 5–0 | 2015 FIFA Women's World Cup qualification |
| 15. | 13 February 2014 | Komotini Municipal Stadium, Komotini, Greece | Greece | 4–0 | 5–0 | 2015 FIFA Women's World Cup qualification |
| 16. | 7 May 2014 | Tønsberg Gressbane, Tønsberg, Norway | Portugal | 1–0 | 2–0 | 2015 FIFA Women's World Cup qualification |
| 17. | 19 September 2017 | Sarpsborg Stadion, Sarpsborg, Norway | Slovakia | 2–0 | 6–1 | 2019 FIFA Women's World Cup qualification |
| 18. | 28 February 2018 | Albufeira Municipal Stadium, Albufeira, Portugal | Australia | 1–0 | 3–4 | 2018 Algarve Cup |
| 19. | 28 February 2018 | Albufeira Municipal Stadium, Albufeira, Portugal | Australia | 3–3 | 3–4 | 2018 Algarve Cup |
| 20. | 8 October 2019 | Tórsvøllur, Tórshavn, Faroe Islands | Faroe Islands | 13–0 | 13–0 | UEFA Women's Euro 2022 qualifying |
| 21. | 4 March 2020 | Vista Municipal Stadium, Parchal, Portugal | Denmark | 1–1 | 2–1 | 2020 Algarve Cup |

== Career statistics ==
As of 17 November 2025

| Club | Season | Division | League | | Cup | | Continental | | Total | |
| Club | Season | Division | Apps | Goals | Apps | Goals | Apps | Goals | Apps | Goals |
|---|---|---|---|---|---|---|---|---|---|---|
| Arna-Bjørnar | 2006 | Toppserien | 18 | 19 | 0 | 0 | - | | 18 | 19 |
| Arna-Bjørnar | 2007 | Toppserien | 22 | 6 | 0 | 0 | - | | 22 | 6 |
| Arna-Bjørnar | 2008 | Toppserien | 19 | 14 | 0 | 0 | - | | 19 | 14 |
| Arna-Bjørnar | Total | | 59 | 39 | 0 | 0 | - | - | 59 | 39 |
| Røa | 2009 | Toppserien | 18 | 11 | 0 | 0 | 6 | 1 | 24 | 12 |
| Røa | 2010 | Toppserien | 21 | 11 | 0 | 0 | 4 | 2 | 25 | 13 |
| Røa | 2011 | Toppserien | 19 | 27 | 3 | 0 | - | | 22 | 27 |
| Røa | 2012 | Toppserien | 18 | 11 | 5 | 6 | 4 | 2 | 27 | 19 |
| Røa | Total | | 76 | 60 | 8 | 6 | 14 | 5 | 98 | 71 |
| Stabæk | 2013 | Toppserien | 21 | 19 | 5 | 2 | - | | 26 | 21 |
| Stabæk | 2014 | Toppserien | 19 | 12 | 1 | 1 | 1 | 0 | 21 | 13 |
| Stabæk | Total | | 40 | 31 | 6 | 3 | 1 | 0 | 47 | 34 |
| Avaldsnes | 2015 | Toppserien | 21 | 10 | 4 | 2 | - | | 25 | 12 |
| Avaldsnes | 2016 | Toppserien | 16 | 6 | 2 | 0 | 5 | 4 | 23 | 10 |
| Avaldsnes | 2017 | Toppserien | 22 | 11 | 5 | 6 | 5 | 2 | 32 | 19 |
| Avaldsnes | Total | | 59 | 27 | 11 | 8 | 10 | 6 | 80 | 41 |
| Canberra United | 2017–18 | W-League | 9 | 6 | 0 | 0 | - | | 9 | 6 |
| Canberra United | Total | | 9 | 6 | 0 | 0 | - | - | 9 | 6 |
| Utah Royals | 2019 | NWSL | 9 | 0 | 0 | 0 | - | | 9 | 0 |
| Utah Royals | Total | | 9 | 0 | 0 | 0 | - | - | 9 | 0 |
| LSK Kvinner | 2019 | Toppserien | 22 | 12 | 4 | 4 | 1 | 0 | 27 | 16 |
| LSK Kvinner | Total | | 22 | 12 | 4 | 4 | 1 | 0 | 27 | 16 |
| Canberra United | 2019–20 | W-League | 10 | 2 | 0 | 0 | - | | 10 | 2 |
| Canberra United | Total | | 10 | 2 | 0 | 0 | - | - | 10 | 2 |
| Avaldsnes | 2020 | Toppserien | 15 | 8 | 0 | 0 | - | | 15 | 8 |
| Avaldsnes | Total | | 15 | 8 | 0 | 0 | - | - | 15 | 8 |
| Vålerenga | 2021 | Toppserien | 13 | 5 | 2 | 6 | 3 | 4 | 18 | 15 |
| Vålerenga | 2022 | Toppserien | 24 | 19 | 3 | 3 | 0 | 0 | 27 | 22 |
| Vålerenga | 2023 | Toppserien | 21 | 6 | 4 | 1 | 4 | 1 | 29 | 8 |
| Vålerenga | 2024 | Toppserien | 20 | 8 | 3 | 0 | 7 | 2 | 30 | 10 |
| Vålerenga | 2025 | Toppserien | 21 | 8 | 4 | 1 | 5 | 2 | 30 | 11 |
| Vålerenga | Total | | 99 | 46 | 16 | 11 | 19 | 9 | 134 | 66 |
| Career total | | | 398 | 231 | 47 | 38 | 45 | 20 | 490 | 289 |

== Honours ==
=== Club ===
Røa

- Toppserien: 2009, 2011
- Norwegian Cup: 2009, 2010

Stabæk

- Toppserien: 2013
- Norwegian Cup: 2013

LSK Kvinner

- Toppserien: 2019
- Norwegian Cup: 2019

Avaldsnes

- Norwegian Cup: 2017

Vålerenga

- Toppserien: 2023, 2024
- Norwegian Cup: 2021, 2024

=== Individual ===
- Toppserien Golden Boot: 2006 (19 goals), 2011 (27 goals), 2013 (19 goals)

== See also ==
- List of women's footballers with 100 or more international caps
