= 2010 Toppserien =

Toppserien
- Season: 2010
- Champions: Stabæk
- Relegated: Donn; Fløya
- Champions League: Stabæk
- Matches: 132
- Goals: 443 (3.36 per match)
- Top goalscorer: Lise Klaveness (21)
- Biggest home win: Stabæk 9–0 Linderud-Grei (7 August 2010)
- Biggest away win: Kattem 0–7 Arna-Bjørnar (12 June 2010); Arna-Bjørnar 0–7 Stabæk (4 September 2010)
- Highest scoring: Kattem 2–7 Stabæk (1 May 2010); Linderud-Grei 2–7 Røa (31 July 2010); Stabæk 9–0 Linderud-Grei (7 August 2010)

The 2010 Toppserien was the 27th season of top-tier women's football in Norway. A total of twelve teams contested the league, consisting of ten who competed in the previous season and two promoted from the 1. divisjon. The season ran from 5 April to 11 November 2010, and was won by Stabæk, their first ever title. As champions, they also qualified for the Round of 32 of the 2011-12 UEFA Women's Champions League.

Stabæk completed the entire season undefeated, and were confirmed as league champions on the penultimate day after beating Trondheims-Ørn 3–0, at the same time as runners-up Røa lost 0–4 to Kolbotn. The roles were thus reversed from the previous season, when Røa won the league ahead of Stabæk. Kolbotn once again finished third after winning 2–0 against Arna-Bjørnar in the final round.

Fløya were the first team of the season to be relegated, on 30 October. They would have been joined by newcomers Donn, whose licensing application for the 2011 season was denied on 4 November for financial reasons. Those same reasons, however, lead to Donn being declared bankrupt six days later.

Linderud-Grei, founded in 2006 by Linderud IL and SF Grei to promote women's football in Groruddalen, played in the top flight for the first time. They finished second to last in the standings, but retained their Toppserien spot because of Donn's bankruptcy and demotion. It was the first time since 2007 that a newly promoted team had avoided relegation.

As of 2010, the women's football club Team Strømmen are affiliated with Lillestrøm SK and have changed their name to LSK Kvinner. This is the second instance in Norway of a leading women's club becoming affiliated with a leading men's club, the first occurring in 2009 when Asker Fotball relocated to Bærum and became Stabæk Fotball.

== League table ==
Pos	Team	Pld	W	D	L	GF	GA	GD	Pts	Qualification or relegation
1	Stabæk (C)	22	17	5	0	72	8	+64	56	Qualification for the Champions League round of 32
2	Røa	22	15	3	4	56	33	+23	48	
3	Kolbotn	22	15	2	5	49	12	+37	47	
4	Arna-Bjørnar	22	14	1	7	55	26	+29	43	
5	Trondheims-Ørn	22	12	2	8	34	29	+5	38	
6	LSK Kvinner	22	11	3	8	42	32	+10	36	
7	Klepp	22	8	5	9	34	29	+5	29	
8	Amazon Grimstad	22	9	2	11	28	43	−15	29	
9	Donn (R)	22	6	2	14	25	45	−20	20	Relegation to First Division (Note: Donn were demoted to the 1. divisjon after their licensing application for the 2011 season was denied.)
10	Kattem	22	4	2	16	17	58	−41	14	
11	Linderud-Grei	22	3	4	15	16	62	−46	13	
12	Fløya (R)	22	1	3	18	15	66	−51	6	Relegation to First Division

Source: NRK Sport
Rules for classification: 1) points; 2) goal difference; 3) number of goals scored.
(C) Champions; (R) Relegated

== Results ==
Home \ Away	STB	RØA	KOL	A-B	ØRN	LSK	KLP	AG	FKD	KAT	LGT	IFF
Stabæk	—	7–0	0–0	1–0	3–0	2–0	2–0	2–0	3–0	2–0	9–0	4–0
Røa	2–2	—	0–4	1–0	2–1	3–0	1–0	4–1	6–2	4–1	2–0	5–0
Kolbotn	0–1	3–0	—	2–0	0–2	1–1	2–1	6–0	3–1	4–0	8–0	4–0
Arna-Bjørnar	0–7	1–1	1–2	—	3–1	6–1	1–0	8–0	1–0	1–0	3–0	4–0
Trondheims-Ørn	1–5	1–2	1–0	1–2	—	2–3	3–1	2–1	1–0	2–0	1–0	3–0
LSK Kvinner	0–2	2–1	1–0	3–0	2–2	—	3–0	1–0	1–2	2–3	4–0	4–0
Klepp	2–2	1–1	1–0	1–3	0–1	1–2	—	0–0	5–1	4–0	3–1	6–1
Amazon Grimstad	0–6	0–2	0–2	3–0	1–2	2–0	2–3	—	1–0	3–0	2–0	4–2
Donn	0–0	2–5	0–2	2–4	1–2	2–0	1–2	0–2	—	0–0	2–1	4–2
Kattem	2–7	3–5	0–1	0–7	0–3	0–5	1–2	1–3	1–2	—	1–1	1–0
Linderud-Grei	0–4	2–7	0–2	0–4	1–1	1–5	0–0	1–1	2–1	0–2	—	2–0
Fløya	1–1	0–2	2–3	0–6	2–1	2–2	1–1	1–2	1–2	0–1	0–4	—

Source: NRK Sport
Legend: Blue = home team win; Yellow = draw; Red = away team win.

== Top goalscorers ==
Rank	Player	Club	Goals
1	(Norway) Lise Klaveness	Stabæk	21
2	(Norway) Tina Algrøy	Arna-Bjørnar	15
2	(Norway) Emilie Haavi	Røa	15
4	(Norway) Lisa-Marie Woods	Stabæk	13
5	(England) Kristy Moore	Stabæk	13
6	(Norway) Gry Ims	Klepp	11
6	(Norway) Elise Thorsnes	Røa	11
8	(England) Rebecca Angus	Kolbotn	10
8	(Norway) Cathrine Dyngvold	Klepp	10
8	(Norway) Madeleine Giske	Arna-Bjørnar	10
8	(Denmark) Maiken Pape	Stabæk	10

== See also ==
- 2010 in Norwegian football
