= Maria Brochmann =

Norwegian footballer (born 1993)

Personal information
- Full name: Maria Dybwad Brochmann
- Date of birth: 25 March 1993 (age 33)
- Height: 1.82 m (6 ft 0 in)
- Position: Forward

Team information
- Current team: Åsane (playing assistant manager)

Youth career
- Åsane

Senior career*
Years	Team	Apps	(Gls)
2009–2013	Åsane		
2014–2018	Arna-Bjørnar	85	(27)
2019–2023	Brann	93	(38)
2024	Djurgården	4	(0)
2025–	Åsane		

International career^{‡}
2014–2015	Norway U23	7	(1)

Managerial career
- 2020: Tertnes
- 2022–2023: Fana
- 2025–: Åsane (playing assistant)
- * Club domestic league appearances and goals as of 1 January 2025 ‡ National team caps and goals as of 1 January 2025

Maria Dybwad Brochmann (born 25 March 1993) is a Norwegian footballer who plays as a forward for Djurgården.

== Club career ==
Brochmann hails from Bergen and started her career in Åsane. Her breakthrough came in the 2013 Norwegian First Division, where she became top goalscorer with 20 goals in 20 games.

In 2014 she moved up one division to Arna-Bjørnar. During parts of her spell at Arna-Bjørnar, she played as a defender. However, she reverted to being a forward and became one of the most prolific goalscorers of the 2018 Toppserien. She lastly served as team captain before moving to city rivals IL Sandviken ahead of the 2019 season.

Brochmann reached a milestone when winning the 2021 Toppserien with Sandviken. In the penultimate game, the team secured gold as Brochmann scored 5 times in a 8–0 thrashing of Klepp. Sandviken was subsequently renamed SK Brann Kvinner, and with Brann, Brochmann scored her first Champions League goals in 2022, with 3 goals in 4 games during the 2022–23 UEFA Women's Champions League qualifying rounds. During the 2023–24 UEFA Women's Champions League qualifying rounds, she scored 3 goals in a single game against Stare Zagora. At the same time, there was doubt whether Brann wanted to renew Brochmann's contract which was due to expire after the 2023 season. At the end of the season, it was announced that Brann brought in Anna Aahjem to replace Brochmann. Instead, Brochmann signed for Djurgårdens IF in Sweden. In the spring of 2024, she played 4 games in Damallsvenskan.

== International career ==
Brochmann did not play for any youth national teams until the age of 21, when she was selected for Norway U23. She received her first callup for Norway in August 2018, when she was included in the squad to face Slovakia and the Netherlands. She did not get any playtime however.

== Managerial career ==
In her late 20s, Brochmann began working as a coach in Tertnes IL. Her work here was severely curtailed by the COVID-19 pandemic. In January 2022 she was announced as the head coach of Fana IL. As at August 2023, the team was leading their Third Division group. The team won promotion to the 2024 Second Division. However, Brochmann resigned as coach when she moved to play in Sweden.

Ahead of the 2025 season, Brochmann was announced as the new playing assistant coach of Åsane.
