= 2011 Toppserien =

Toppserien
- Season: 2011
- Champions: Røa
- Relegated: Medkila; Linderud-Grei
- Champions League: Røa; Stabæk
- Matches: 132
- Goals: 505 (3.83 per match)
- Top goalscorer: Elise Thorsnes (27 goals)
- Biggest home win: Røa 13–0 Linderud-Grei
- Biggest away win: Amazon Grimstad 0–7 Arna-Bjørnar
- Highest scoring: Røa 13–0 Linderud-Grei

The 2011 Toppserien was the 28th season of top-tier women's football in Norway. A total of twelve teams contested the league, consisting of ten who competed in the previous season and two promoted from the 1. divisjon. The season started on 2 April 2011 and, it ended on 29 October 2011.

== Changes from 2010 ==
- Norway overtook Iceland in the UEFA coefficient rankings for eighth spot in the 2012–13 European season. Thus Norway gains a second entry for the Champions League which is naturally given to the season's runner-up.

== Teams ==
Teams not returning for this season, after being relegated in 2010 were IF Fløya and FK Donn. Donn finished 9th of 12 but were denied a license for 2011. Teams entering this season, after being promoted in 2010 are IL Sandviken and Medkila IL.

== League table ==
Pos	Team	Pld	W	D	L	GF	GA	GD	Pts	Qualification or relegation
1	Røa (C)	22	18	0	4	76	18	+58	54	Qualification for the Champions League round of 32
2	Stabæk	22	16	3	3	57	10	+47	51	Qualification for the Champions League round of 32
3	Kolbotn	22	16	3	3	59	26	+33	51	
4	Arna-Bjørnar	22	16	1	5	64	19	+45	49	
5	LSK Kvinner	22	13	1	8	47	42	+5	40	
6	Trondheims-Ørn	22	11	2	9	45	41	+4	35	
7	Amazon Grimstad	22	8	3	11	33	42	−9	27	
8	Klepp	22	6	5	11	28	37	−9	23	
9	Kattem	22	5	4	13	36	60	−24	19	
10	Sandviken	22	5	4	13	24	51	−27	19	
11	Medkila (R)	22	3	3	16	20	63	−43	12	Relegation to First Division
12	Linderud-Grei (R)	22	0	1	21	16	96	−80	1	Relegation to First Division

Source: NRK Sport
Rules for classification: 1) points; 2) goal difference; 3) number of goals scored.
(C) Champions; (R) Relegated

== Results ==
Locations of teams in the 2011 Toppserien

Home \ Away	STB	RØA	KOL	A-B	LSK	ØRN	KLP	AG	KAT	ILS	MED	LGT
Stabæk	—	2–0	0–0	0–1	4–0	2–0	2–1	0–0	3–0	5–1	4–0	8–0
Røa	1–2	—	1–4	1–0	5–0	3–1	4–1	4–1	8–1	3–1	4–0	13–0
Kolbotn	2–1	0–4	—	2–1	3–2	0–1	4–0	2–3	5–1	5–1	2–2	5–2
Arna-Bjørnar	0–1	0–1	1–2	—	1–0	2–1	3–0	1–0	4–1	5–0	3–1	9–0
LSK Kvinner	1–0	2–1	2–4	3–4	—	3–2	2–0	3–2	4–2	2–2	3–1	3–1
Trondheims-Ørn	0–2	1–4	0–2	2–5	4–3	—	2–0	4–1	3–3	2–1	4–2	5–0
Klepp	1–1	1–2	1–1	2–4	3–0	0–1	—	1–0	0–1	0–0	1–0	5–0
Amazon Grimstad	0–5	1–2	0–3	0–7	0–1	4–0	0–1	—	3–2	2–2	2–0	3–1
Kattem	1–5	0–1	1–2	2–2	1–5	0–3	3–3	0–5	—	1–0	5–0	4–0
Sandviken	0–1	0–3	1–3	1–4	1–2	2–2	3–1	0–2	2–1	—	2–1	2–1
Medkila	0–4	0–6	1–4	0–3	0–3	0–4	3–3	1–1	0–4	4–0	—	2–0
Linderud-Grei	1–5	0–5	0–4	0–4	1–3	2–3	1–3	2–3	2–2	1–2	1–3	—

Source: NRK Sport results
Legend: Blue = home team win; Yellow = draw; Red = away team win.

== Top goalscorers ==
Rank	Player	Club	Goals
1	(Norway) Elise Thorsnes	Røa	27
2	(England) Kristy Moore	Stabæk	20
3	(Norway) Emilie Haavi	Røa	16
4	(Norway) Madeleine Giske	Arna-Bjørnar	14
4	(Norway) Julie Adserø	Kattem	14
6	(Norway) Ada Hegerberg	Kolbotn	12
7	(Norway) Maren Mjelde	Arna-Bjørnar	11
7	(Norway) Line Smørsgård	Kolbotn	11
9	(Norway) Nasra Abdullah	LSK Kvinner	10
9	(Norway) Melissa Bjånesøy	Sandviken	10
9	(Norway) Oda Fugelsnes	Trondheims-Ørn	10
9	(Norway) Lene Mykjåland	Røa	10
