= Stine Hovland =

Norwegian football player (born 1991)

Personal information
- Full name: Stine Hovland
- Date of birth: 31 January 1991 (age 35)
- Place of birth: Vadheim, Norway
- Height: 1.72 m (5 ft 8 in)
- Position: Defender

Team information
- Current team: FK Bergen Nord

Youth career
- Høyang

Senior career*
Years	Team	Apps	(Gls)
2010–2013	Kaupanger		
2014–2019	Sandviken	119	(9)
2019–2020	A.C. Milan	13	(1)
2022–2026	Arna-Bjørnar	71	(1)
2026–	FK Bergen Nord	0	(0)

International career
2018–2019	Norway	7	(0)
- * Club domestic league appearances and goals as of 10 May 2020

Stine Hovland (born 31 January 1991) is a Norwegian football defender, who plays for FK Bergen Nord in the Toppserien. A relatively late bloomer, Hovland did not play in the Norwegian Toppserien until she was 24 years old and she made her national team debut at 27 years old.

== Club career ==
Hovland joined Bergen-based Sandviken from Kaupanger in December 2013 and went on to be an important player and club captain. In her first season Sandviken were promoted to the Toppserien as 1. divisjon champions. In 2018 she helped Sandviken reach the Norwegian Women's Cup final, which they lost 4–0 to LSK Kvinner FK.

In April 2019, Hovland was reported to be a transfer target for professional clubs A.C. Milan and West Ham United. She signed for Milan in July.

== International career ==
In November 2018, Hovland won her first cap for the senior Norway women's national football team, in a 4–1 friendly defeat by Japan at Tottori Bank Bird Stadium. She was also included in the 2019 Algarve Cup-winning squad and secured her place in Norway's 2019 FIFA Women's World Cup panel.

== Personal life ==
Hovland's brother Even is also an international footballer. The siblings were team mates in their local youth team. At the time of the 2019 FIFA Women's World Cup, Hovland was not a professional footballer. She had to take annual leave from her day job as a preschool teacher to attend the tournament in France.

== Career statistics ==
As of 9 November 2019

Club	Season	Division	League		Cup		Continental		Total	
Club	Season	Division	Apps	Goals	Apps	Goals	Apps	Goals	Apps	Goals
Sandviken	2014	1. divisjon	22	4	3	0	-		25	4
Sandviken	2015	Toppserien	22	1	3	0	-		25	1
Sandviken	2016	Toppserien	22	2	3	0	-		25	2
Sandviken	2017	Toppserien	22	1	2	0	-		24	1
Sandviken	2018	Toppserien	22	1	5	0	-		27	1
Sandviken	2019	Toppserien	9	0	0	0	-		9	0
Sandviken	Total		119	9	16	0	-	-	135	9
A.C. Milan	2019–20	Serie A	5	1	0	0	-		5	1
A.C. Milan	Total		5	1	0	0	-	-	5	1
Career total			124	10	16	0	-	-	140	10
