= Nora Neset Gjøen =

Norwegian footballer (born 1992)

Nora Gjøen-Gjøsæter
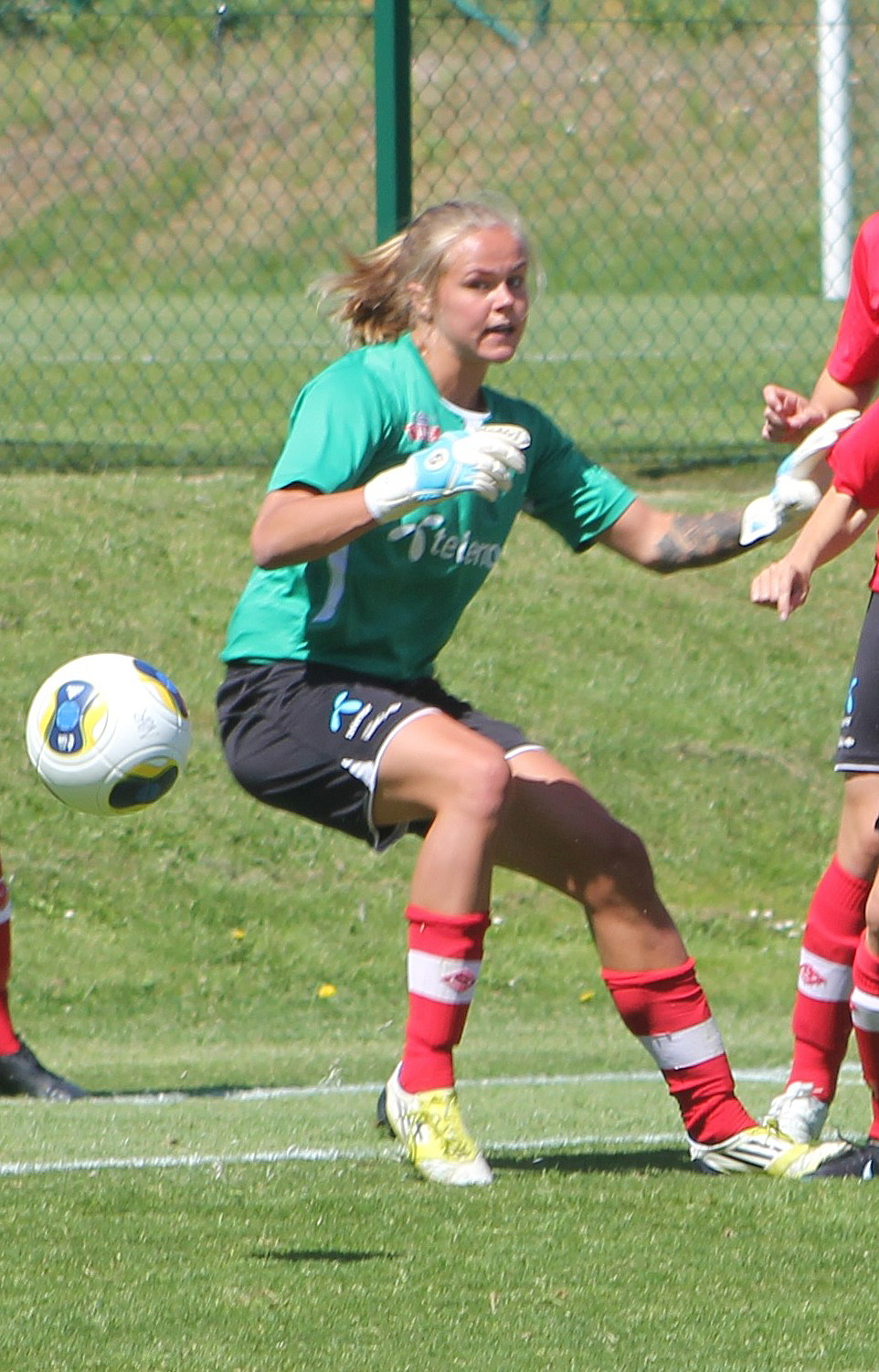

Personal information
- Full name: Nora Gjøen-Gjøsæter
- Birth name: Nora Neset Gjøen
- Date of birth: 20 February 1992 (age 34)
- Place of birth: Bergen, Norway
- Height: 1.74 m (5 ft 8 1/2 in)
- Position: Goalkeeper

Team information
- Current team: Arna-Bjørnar
- Number: 99

Youth career
- 1998–2007: Øygard

College career
Years	Team	Apps	(Gls)
2013	Florida Gators		

Senior career*
Years	Team	Apps	(Gls)
2008	IL Gneist		
2009	Arna-Bjørnar		
2010–2011	LSK Kvinner	29	(0)
2012	Sandviken	17	(0)
2013	Kolbotn	8	(0)
2014–2015	LSK Kvinner	20	(0)
2016	Grei Kvinner		
2017–2020	Sandviken	67	(0)
2021–2022	Grand Bodø	4	(0)
2023–	Arna-Bjørnar	0	(0)

International career^{‡}
2013–	Norway	3	(0)
Medal record
Women's football
Representing Norway
UEFA Women's Championship
Silver medal – second place	2013 Sweden	Team
- * Club domestic league appearances and goals as of 18 May 2024 ‡ National team caps and goals as of 14:16, 21 September 2014 (UTC)

Nora Gjøen-Gjøsæter (born Nora Neset Gjøen; 20 February 1992) is a Norwegian football goalkeeper who plays in the Toppserien league for Arna-Bjørnar. She plays for the Norway women's national football team.

Gjøen first came to national attention in December 2007 as a 15-year-old when she escaped with her life after being trapped by smoke and flames in a fire that destroyed her family home on the island of Sotra in the space of only a few minutes, by jumping from a third-floor window at a height of over seven metres. Her goalkeeper's instincts were said to have helped her to survive the fall with a relatively minor injury, a broken vertebra without nerve damage (no one else was injured). The press coverage was summarised in English.

== Club Football ==
After making a full recovery she returned to top-level football a year later, as a junior keeper for Arna-Bjørnar, and in December 2009 she joined LSK Kvinner FK in Oslo as the club's reserve keeper. She made her Toppserien debut on June 12, 2010 against the Norwegian champions, Røa, and then went on to play every match for LSK Kvinner during 2011. In 2012, she moved back to Bergen as first-keeper for IL Sandviken, a club her family had been involved with for many years.

With Gjøen as their keeper Sandviken finished the 2012 Toppserien season in sixth place, their best for many years. At the end of the season she announced she would spend the spring semester of 2013 at the University of Florida at Gainesville, from where she returned to play in the Toppserien for Kolbotn from 5 May until 15 June. At the end of 2013 Gjøen signed a contract to play for LSK Kvinner.

== International Football ==
Gjøen was Norway's first-choice goalkeeper in the 2012 FIFA U-20 Women's World Cup competition, held in Japan during August and September, 2012. She played in all Norway's matches. The team beat Canada and Argentina in the group stage but lost to North Korea, finishing in second place in the group. In the quarter-finals they were beaten by the eventual beaten finalists, Germany.

From summer 2007 until 16 July 2012 Nora Gjøen played 27 matches in goal for Norway's international youth teams from Under-15 to Under-23. The four matches with the Under-20s in Japan in August referred to above bring the total to 31.

In September 2012 Norway qualified for the UEFA Women's Euro 2013 by beating Belgium and Iceland, and the team produced a short video in which Gjøen rapped the story of the team's qualification campaign in Norwegian and English.

Gjøen joined the Norwegian squad that travelled to Sweden to play in the Euros as the third goalkeeper, but she became the first reserve after the second keeper suffered an injury, and Gjøen sat on the bench as Norway's reserve goalkeeper in the final at Friends Arena, which Norway lost 1–0 to Germany.
