= 2012 Toppserien =

Toppserien
- Season: 2012
- Champions: Lillestrøm
- Relegated: Fart, Kattem
- Champions League: Lillestrøm
- Matches: 132
- Goals: 501 (3.8 per match)
- Top goalscorer: Isabell Herlovsen (25 goals)
- Biggest home win: Røa 7–0 Fart
- Biggest away win: Fart 0–11 Arna-Bjørnar
- Highest scoring: Fart 0–11 Arna-Bjørnar
- Longest winning run: 11 games - Røa
- Longest unbeaten run: 15 games - Stabæk
- Longest winless run: 22 games - Fart
- Longest losing run: 22 games - Fart
- Total attendance: 26,068
- Average attendance: 197

The 2012 Toppserien was the 29th season of top-tier women's football in Norway. A total of 12 teams contested the league, ten returning from the 2011 season and the two teams promoted from the First Division, Vålerenga and Fart.

The season started on 14 April 2012.

== Changes from 2011 ==
- Norway fell from 8th to 11th in the UEFA coefficient rankings for the 2013–14 European season. Thus the runners-up is no longer qualified to the Champions League.
- The eleventh placed teams will play a promotion/relegation play-off against the second league's second-place finisher. A play-off was last played in 2006.

== Teams ==
Locations of the teams in the 2013 Toppserien

Team	Location	Arena	Manager
Amazon Grimstad	Grimstad	Levermyr Stadion	Margunn Haugenes
Arna-Bjørnar	Bergen	Arna Stadion	Morten Kalvenes
Fart	Vang	Fartbana	
Kattem	Trondheim	Åsheim kunstgress	Steinar Mikkelsen
Kolbotn	Kolbotn	Sofiemyr Stadion	Kjell S. H. Wold
Klepp	Kleppe	Klepp Stadion	Knut Eriksen
Lillestrøm	Lillestrøm	LSK-Hallen	Ranveig Karlsen
Røa	Oslo	Røa Kunstgress	Geir Nordby
Sandviken	Bergen	Stemmemyren idrettsplass	Arne Møller
Stabæk	Bærum	Nadderud Stadion	Øyvind Eide
Trondheims-Ørn	Trondheim	DnB NOR Arena	Thomas Dahle
Vålerenga	Oslo	Vallhall Arena	Anita Waage

== League table ==
Pos	Team	Pld	W	D	L	GF	GA	GD	Pts	Qualification or relegation
1	LSK Kvinner (C)	22	18	2	2	66	17	+49	56	Qualification for the Champions League round of 32
2	Stabæk	22	15	5	2	70	21	+49	50	
3	Arna-Bjørnar	22	14	5	3	61	21	+40	47	
4	Røa	22	15	4	3	58	19	+39	47 (Note: Røa were deducted 2 point because of lack of financial control.)	
5	Kolbotn	22	9	7	6	36	35	+1	34	
6	Sandviken	22	9	2	11	45	51	−6	29	
7	Klepp	22	7	5	10	41	41	0	26	
8	Vålerenga	22	6	5	11	27	47	−20	23	
9	Trondheims-Ørn	22	6	3	13	29	50	−21	21	
10	Amazon Grimstad	22	5	5	12	25	35	−10	20	
11	Kattem (Note: Kattem withdrew their team after the season ended and Fart were offered their place in the 2013 Toppserien, but declined. Instead, Medkila were awarded a spot in the 2013 Toppserien season.) (O)	22	5	3	14	34	56	−22	15 (Note: Kattem were deducted 3 point because of license of act plan.)	Qualification for the relegation play-offs
12	Fart (R)	22	0	0	22	9	108	−99	0	Relegation to First Division

Source: NIFS
Rules for classification: (1) points; (2) goal difference; (3) number of goals scored.
(C) Champions; (O) Play-off winners; (R) Relegated

== Relegation play-offs ==
Kattem had to face second league's second-place finisher Medkila in a two-legged play-off match for the right to play in the 2013 Toppserien. Kattem won the playoff, but subsequently withdrew their team from the league. Medkila were promoted to take their place in Toppserien.

14 November 2012
18:00

Kattem	3 – 0	Medkila

Nissekollen, Trondheim
17 November 2012
11:30

Medkila	3 – 2	Kattem

Harstad Stadion, Harstad

== Top goalscorers ==
Rank	Player	Club	Goals
1	(Norway) Isabell Herlovsen	LSK Kvinner	25
2	(Norway) Ada Hegerberg	Stabæk	22
3	(Norway) Cecilie Pedersen	LSK Kvinner	19
4	(Norway) Cathrine Dyngvold	Klepp	15
5	(Norway) Lene Mykjåland	Røa	13
6	(Norway) Guro Reiten	Kattem	11
6	(Norway) Elise Thorsnes	Røa	11
6	(Norway) Amalie Eikeland	Arna-Bjørnar	11
9	(Norway) Melissa Bjånesøy	Sandviken	10
9	(Norway) Gry Ims	Klepp	10
