= FL Fart =

Norwegian football club

- Full name: Fotballaget Fart
- Short name: Fart
- Founded: 1934
- Ground: Fartbana; Slemsrud
- Capacity: 1,300
- Chairman: Bjørn-Magne Broen
- Head coach: Morten Flengsrud
- League: Norwegian First Division (women)
- 2019: Toppserien (women), 12th (relegated)
Home colours	Away colours

Fotballaget Fart is a Norwegian football club based in Slemsrud outside Hamar. The club is most noted for their women's team which played in Toppserien in 2008, 2012 and 2019. Their home matches are played at Fartbana. Norway international footballers Thorstein Helstad and Kristin Bekkevold started their careers at Fart.

== History ==
Fotballaget Fart was first founded in 1917, before it was dissolved after nine years of activity. The club was refounded on 28 August 1934. The club got its first pitch with grass in 1958.

In July 2014 FL Fart received 4 million krone from the will of a fan who bequeathed his belongings to the club.

== Women's team ==
The women's team was founded in 1982, and was in 2002 promoted to the third tier with a lot of young players. The club decided to focus more on their women's team and won their 2. Divisjon group in 2003, and was promoted to the 1. divisjon. Fart were originally relegated from the 1. Divisjon in 2006 after a 2–0 loss against Larvik in the decisive match of the 2006 season, but when Liungen decided to withdraw their team, Fart was asked if they wanted to play in 1. Divisjon the next season. Fart won the 1. Divisjon in 2007, and was promoted to Toppserien. Fart only managed to collect one point, a draw against Klepp, in the 2008 Toppserien and were relegated back to the 1. Divisjon. Fart was fighting for promotion in the 2009 season, but was surpassed by Donn after a draw in the penultimate match against Alta and eventually finished third in the league. Fart finished fifth in the 2010 season.

Fart was again promoted to Toppserien in 2011. Fart lost all their matches in the 2012 Toppserien and were again relegated, and beat their own record from 2007 for fewest points in a single Toppserien season. In 44 matches in Toppserien, the team has 1 draw and 43 losses, and holds the record for most matches without a victory in a row. The team has lost their 27 last matches in Toppserien, which is also a record. The club also has most of the negative records for a women's club. After Kattem withdrew their team from Toppserien ahead of the 2013 season, the Football Association of Norway asked Fart if they wanted Kattem's spot in the top-flight. The club rejected the offer after their players stated that they did not want another season where they lost every match.

The team had a slow start in the 2013 season, and the 1–0 victory against Åsane in the eight round was their first victory of the season. This was also the first match Fart won since the 2–1 victory against Vålerenga on 16 October 2011.

== Men's team ==
The men's team were playing in the lower division, except for a spell at the fourth tier between 1968 and 1974. The team won promotion to 3. Divisjon in 1993, where they were playing until the 2007 season, when the team were relegated. During this 14-year spell in the 3. Divisjon, it was the club with the longest spell at the fourth tier. The men's team also played in the 3. Divisjon in 2008 and 2009.

== Notable members ==
Thorstein Helstad started his career in Fart, and aged 16 he scored two goals against Løten in 1993 that made the team win promotion to 3. Divisjon. He has later been capped 38 times for Norway, scoring 10 goals. Kristin Bekkevold, who won the 2000 Summer Olympics with the Norwegian women's team, also started her career in Fart, and played at the same youth-team as Helstad. She later returned to Fart and helped the team progress through the league-system. The referee Espen Berntsen started representing Fart ahead of the 2012 season, after representing FL Vang for most of his career.

== Recent seasons ==
=== Women's team ===
Season		Pos.	Pl.	W	D	L	GS	GA	P	Cup	Notes
2004	D1	7	18	7	1	10	34	46	22	2nd round	
2005	D1	7	18	4	7	7	26	39	19	2nd round	
2006	D1	8	18	4	3	11	24	38	15	3rd round	
2007	D1	1	18	9	5	4	28	22	32	2nd round	Promoted to Toppserien
2008	TS	12	22	0	1	21	13	86	1	3rd round	Relegated to 1. Division
2009	D1	4	22	10	10	2	42	23	40	3rd round	
2010	D1	5	22	9	5	8	35	33	32	1st round	
2011	D1	2	20	13	3	4	53	25	42	2nd round	Promoted to Toppserien
2012	TS	12	22	0	0	22	9	108	0	3rd round	Relegated to 1. Division
2013	D1	10	20	3	3	14	21	55	12	1st round	
2014	D1	8	22	6	7	9	34	50	25	1st round	
2015	D1	7	22	6	9	7	39	35	27	1st round	
2016	D1	9	22	7	4	11	25	45	25	1st round	
2017	D1	10	22	7	3	12	30	42	24	2nd round	
2018	D1	1	22	14	5	3	45	20	47	2nd round	Promoted
2019	TS	12	22	2	4	16	14	60	10	2nd round	Relegated
2020	D1	10	18	1	2	15	13	62	5	1st round	
