= 2013 Norwegian First Division (women) =

1. divisjon
- Season: 2013
- Matches: 110
- Goals: 436 (3.96 per match)
- Biggest home win: Grand Bodø 6–0 Kaupanger; Grand Bodø 6–0 Sarpsborg 08
- Biggest away win: Voss 0–7 Grand Bodø
- Highest scoring: Kongsvinger 3–7 Åsane
- Longest winning run: 7 games Grand Bodø; Sarpsborg 08
- Longest unbeaten run: 12 games Grand Bodø
- Longest winless run: 11 games Voss
- Longest losing run: 6 games Fart; Voss
- Total attendance: 11,338
- Average attendance: 103

The 2013 1. divisjon (women) is the second tier of Norwegian women's football in 2013. The season kicked off on 13 April 2013, and was finished on 19 October 2013.

The top placed team was promoted to the 2014 Toppserien. The second placed team contested a playoff against the eleventh-placed team from this year's Toppserien for the right to play in Toppserien next season.

== Participating teams ==
Locations of the teams in 1. Divisjon, 2012

2012 champions Avaldsnes were promoted to the Toppserien at the end of the 2012 season. They were replaced by Fart, who were relegated from the 2012 Toppserien. Alta and Voss were relegated at the end of the 2012 season after finishing in the bottom two places of the table. They were replaced by the two playoff-winners Kaupanger and Lyn. In January 2013, Toppserien-club Kattem withdrew from the league. Their place in the 2013 Toppserien was first offered to Fart, who declined, and then to Medkila, who accepted. Alta were then offered Medkila's place in the 2013 1. divisjon, but declined. The offer then went to Voss, who accepted, and took their place in the 2013 1. divisjon despite finishing last in 2012. Subsequently, Sola withdrew their team from the 2013 1. divisjon. The football association decided not to offer Sola's place to another team. The season will therefore be played with only 11 teams.

These are the participating teams:

- Fart
- Fløya
- Fortuna Ålesund
- Grand Bodø
- Kaupanger
- Kongsvinger
- Linderud-Grei
- Lyn
- Sarpsborg 08
- Voss
- Åsane

== League table ==
| Pos | Team | Pld | W | D | L | GF | GA | GD | Pts | Promotion, qualification or relegation |
|---|---|---|---|---|---|---|---|---|---|---|
| 1 | Grand Bodø (C, P) | 20 | 16 | 1 | 3 | 73 | 23 | +50 | 49 | Promotion to Toppserien |
| 2 | Sarpsborg 08 | 20 | 14 | 0 | 6 | 48 | 28 | +20 | 42 | Qualification for the promotion play-offs |
| 3 | Åsane | 20 | 12 | 2 | 6 | 44 | 33 | +11 | 38 | |
| 4 | Linderud-Grei | 20 | 11 | 2 | 7 | 34 | 24 | +10 | 35 | |
| 5 | Lyn | 20 | 8 | 6 | 6 | 39 | 36 | +3 | 30 | |
| 6 | Fløya | 20 | 9 | 2 | 9 | 50 | 43 | +7 | 29 | |
| 7 | Fortuna | 20 | 8 | 5 | 7 | 38 | 35 | +3 | 29 | |
| 8 | Kongsvinger | 20 | 7 | 1 | 12 | 40 | 54 | −14 | 22 | |
| 9 | Kaupanger | 20 | 6 | 3 | 11 | 30 | 48 | −18 | 21 | |
| 10 | Fart | 20 | 3 | 3 | 14 | 21 | 55 | −34 | 12 | |
| 11 | Voss (R) | 20 | 1 | 5 | 14 | 19 | 57 | −38 | 8 | Relegation to Second Division |

Source: nifs.no
Rules for classification: 1) points; 2) goal difference; 3) number of goals scored.
(C) Champions; (P) Promoted; (R) Relegated

== Top scorers ==
| Goalscorers | Goals | Team |
|---|---|---|
| (Norway) Maria Dybwad Brochmann | 20 | Åsane |
| (Norway) Elin Gladheim | 16 | Sarpsborg 08 |
| (Norway) Pernille Velta | 13 | Kongsvinger |
| (Norway) Anette Heimli Jokstad | 11 | Lyn |
| (Norway) Eli Gulbrandsen | 11 | Linderud-Grei |
| (Norway) Lise Janbu Eide | 11 | Fortuna Ålesund |
| (Norway) Anne Marthe Birkeland | 10 | Grand Bodø |
| (Norway) Eline Johansen | 10 | Fløya |
| (Norway) Ingeborg Anette Nordheim | 10 | Grand Bodø |
| (Norway) Line Dverseth Danielsen | 10 | Grand Bodø |

== See also ==
- 2013 in Norwegian football
- 2013 Toppserien
