= Kristin Bekkevold =

Norwegian footballer (born 1977)

Personal information
- Full name: Kristin Bekkevold Sørum
- Date of birth: 19 April 1977 (age 49)
- Place of birth: Hamar, Norway
- Height: 1.73 m (5 ft 8 in)
- Position: Centre-back

Youth career
- FL Fart

Senior career*
Years	Team	Apps	(Gls)
1994–1996	Brumunddal		
1997–2002	Asker		
2003–2008	FL Fart		
2009–2011	Brumunddal		

International career^{‡}
2000–2001	Norway	12	(1)
Medal record
Women's football
Representing Norway
Olympic Games
Gold medal – first place	2000 Sydney	Team competition
- * Club domestic league appearances and goals as of 14:16, 14 September 2014 (UTC) ‡ National team caps and goals as of 14:16, 14 September 2014 (UTC)

Kristin Bekkevold Sørum (born 19 April 1977) is a former Norwegian footballer and Olympic champion.

She received a gold medal at the 2000 Summer Olympics in Sydney.

In January 2001 Bekkevold underwent surgery for a knee injury. She left Asker in 2002 and returned to playing for FL Fart. When Fart won the 1. divisjon in 2007, they were promoted and Bekkevold made a Toppserien comeback in 2008. She signed for Brumunddal, who she had previously represented between 1994 and 1996, in February 2009. Bekkevold left Brumunddal and retired from football at the age of 34 after suffering another knee injury.
