= Madeleine Giske =

Norwegian football midfielder (born 1987)

Personal information
- Full name: Madeleine Giske
- Date of birth: 14 September 1987 (age 39)
- Place of birth: Nuremberg, West Germany
- Height: 1.65 m (5 ft 5 in)
- Positions: Midfielder; forward

Senior career*
Years	Team	Apps	(Gls)
- Bjarg
- Fana
2003–2006	Sandviken		
2006–2011	Arna-Bjørnar	91	(55)
2012	Røa	6	(0)
2013–2014	LSK Kvinner	18	(5)
2015-2016	IL Sandviken	19	(4)

International career^{‡}
	Norway U17	6	(0)
	Norway U19	29	(3)
	Norway U21	9	(0)
	Norway U23	2	(0)
2006–2012	Norway	22	(1)
- * Club domestic league appearances and goals as of 14 April 2013 ‡ National team caps and goals as of 19 February 2012

Madeleine Giske (born 14 September 1987) is a Norwegian former footballer who played as a midfielder. She is a member of the Norway women's national football team.

Giske is the daughter of Anders Giske, a former professional footballer who captained the Norway national football team, as well as playing for clubs such as SK Brann, 1. FC Nürnberg, Bayer Leverkusen and 1. FC Köln.

== Career ==
In 2003 as a 15-year-old Madeleine Giske joined the Bergen club IL Sandviken where she debuted in Division-1 on 26 April. She was an immediate success and continued with the same club when it was promoted into the Toppserien in 2004, scoring eleven goals in that season and also in the next. In 2006, she moved to Arna-Bjørnar, also in Bergen, where she debuted with Erika Skarbø and Elise Thorsnes. She has contributed to making Arna-Bjørnar one of the top clubs in Norway and it finished fifth in the league table for 2009.

Having progressed through Norway's national youth teams, Giske made her senior national team debut on 25 March 2006 in a match against Greece, and scored her first international goal, also in a match against Greece, on 20 June 2006. In most of her first 11 matches for the national team she started on the bench, but she played as a back, an attacking midfielder and as a winger. She went with the team to the 2007 FIFA Women's World Cup in China in 2007 and played as a substitute in Norway's match against Ghana which they won 7–2. The team reached the semifinals of the World Cup where they lost to Germany and eventually finished in 4th place behind Germany, Brazil and USA.

In June 2008, Giske heard of her selection as a reserve for the Norway national side to travel to China for the 2008 Summer Olympics only minutes after she had an anterior cruciate ligament rupture diagnosed, suffered in a club match against Team Strømmen two days earlier on 7 June. The remainder of 2008 was spent recovering and she resumed full training in January 2009.

Giske played 45 minutes for Arna-Bjørnar in a training match against Sandviken on 7 March 2009, resuming her football career exactly nine months after the injury. Since then she became a regular member of Arna-Bjørnar's starting eleven and in the 2009 season she scored eight goals.

Following the end of the 2011 season she signed for Røa IL.

In September 2013 Giske damaged ligaments in her other knee and was ruled out for another nine months.

== International goals ==
No.	Date	Venue	Opponent	Score	Result	Competition
1.	20 June 2006	Halden stadion, Halden, Norway	Greece	4–0	4–0	2007 FIFA Women's World Cup qualification
