= 2013 Toppserien =

Toppserien
- Season: 2013
- Champions: Stabæk
- Relegated: Sandviken
- Champions League: Stabæk
- Matches: 114
- Goals: 388 (3.4 per match)
- Top goalscorer: Elise Thorsnes (19 goals)
- Biggest home win: Arna-Bjørnar 8–1 Medkila
- Biggest away win: Sandviken 0–5 LSK Kvinner; Amazon Grimstad 0–5 Stabæk
- Highest scoring: Arna-Bjørnar 8–1 Medkila
- Longest winning run: 10 games - Stabæk
- Longest unbeaten run: 19 games - Stabæk
- Longest winless run: 14 games - Amazon Grimstad
- Longest losing run: 6 games - Klepp, Sandviken

The 2013 Toppserien was the 30th season of top-tier women's football in Norway. A total of 12 teams are contesting the league, ten returning from the 2012 season and the two teams promoted from the First Division, Avaldsnes and Medkila.

The season started on 13 April 2013 and is planned to end on 2 November 2013.

Locations of the teams in the 2013 Toppserien

== Teams ==
Team	Location	Arena	Manager
Amazon Grimstad	Grimstad	Levermyr Stadion	Margunn Haugenes
Arna-Bjørnar	Bergen	Arna Stadion	Morten Kalvenes
Avaldsnes	Avaldsnes	Avaldsnes Idrettssenter	Roar Wold
Kolbotn	Kolbotn	Sofiemyr Stadion	David Brocken
Klepp	Kleppe	Klepp Stadion	Tommy Velde
Lillestrøm	Lillestrøm	LSK-Hallen	Monica Knudsen
Medkila	Harstad	Harstad Stadion	Roy Berntsen
Røa	Oslo	Røa Kunstgress	Geir Nordby
Sandviken	Bergen	Stemmemyren idrettsplass	Øyvind Nordtveit
Stabæk	Bærum	Nadderud Stadion	Øyvind Eide
Trondheims-Ørn	Trondheim	DnB NOR Arena	Thomas Dahle
Vålerenga	Oslo	Vallhall Arena	Cecilie Berg-Hansen

== League table ==
Pos	Team	Pld	W	D	L	GF	GA	GD	Pts	Qualification or relegation
1	Stabæk (C)	22	17	4	1	64	9	+55	55	Qualification for the Champions League round of 32
2	LSK Kvinner	22	15	4	3	51	18	+33	49	
3	Arna-Bjørnar	22	10	8	4	39	24	+15	38	
4	Avaldsnes	22	10	3	9	39	33	+6	33	
5	Vålerenga	22	8	8	6	41	37	+4	32	
6	Kolbotn	22	9	4	9	39	42	−3	31	
7	Trondheims-Ørn	22	9	3	10	39	49	−10	30	
8	Røa	22	7	7	8	25	33	−8	28	
9	Medkila	22	7	5	10	27	44	−17	26	
10	Klepp	22	6	3	13	29	50	−21	21	
11	Amazon Grimstad (O)	22	3	6	13	22	39	−17	15	Qualification for the relegation play-offs
12	Sandviken (R)	22	3	1	18	19	56	−37	10	Relegation to First Division

Source: NIFS
Rules for classification: 1) points; 2) goal difference; 3) number of goals scored.
(C) Champions; (O) Play-off winners; (R) Relegated

== Top goalscorers ==
Rank	Player	Club	Goals
1	(Norway) Elise Thorsnes	Stabæk	20
2	(Norway) Emilie Haavi	LSK Kvinner	12
2	(Norway) Cathrine Dekkerhus	Stabæk	12
4	(Norway) Caroline Hansen	Stabæk	11
5	(Iceland) Hólmfríður Magnúsdóttir	Avaldsnes	10
5	(Norway) Cecilie Pedersen	Avaldsnes	10
7	(Norway) Trine Lise Åvik	Amazon Grimstad	9
8	(Norway) Elisabeth Jeppesen	Medkila	8
8	(Norway) Line Krogedal	Klepp	8
