= Stabæk Fotball (women) =

Norwegian football team

Stabæk
- Full name: Stabæk Fotball Kvinner
- Nickname: De blaa (The Blues)
- Founded: 16 March 1912; 114 years ago
- Ground: Nadderud Stadion; Bærum
- Chairman: Mimi Berdal
- Coach: Jan Jönsson
- League: Toppserien
- 2026: Toppserien, 6th
Home colours	Away colours

Stabæk Fotball Kvinner is Stabæk IF's women's football team, started on 23 October 2008 with a core of players from Asker. Asker had lost its licence to play in the top league after a failure to meet financial targets, and Stabæk's chairman Mimi Berdal arranged for the new team to be formed within Stabæk IF. The team was immediately joined by other players including Solveig Gulbrandsen.

Stabæk plays in the Toppserien, the top women's league in Norway. The new team set an attendance record in its first match, with 1,321 spectators watching a 2–0 win over Røa, and these two teams have dominated the Norwegian league and cup competitions since then.

Stabæk won the league championship in 2010 and thus qualified for the 2011–12 UEFA Women's Champions League to debut in Europe. The team also finished in second place to Røa in the Toppserien in 2009 and 2011, and in November 2011 won the Norwegian Cup Final.

The team played in the Champions League for the first time in 2011. They met FFC Frankfurt in their first tie and beat them 1–0 in the home match at Nadderud Stadium, Oslo, but lost the return match in Frankfurt 4-1 a week later. They were also qualified to play in the Champions League again in 2012.

Notable former players in the team include Lise Klaveness, Ingrid Hjelmseth, Trine B. Rønning, and the national team captains of Norway and Denmark, Ingvild Stensland and Katrine Pedersen. Ada Hegerberg, the first ever recipient of the Ballon d'Or Féminin in 2018, played for Stabæk in 2012.

== Recent history ==
Season		Pos.	Pl.	W	D	L	GS	GA	P	Cup	Notes
2009	Toppserien	2	22	16	5	1	83	15	53	Third round	
2010	Toppserien	1	22	17	5	0	72	8	56	Quarter-final	
2011	Toppserien	2	22	16	3	3	57	10	51	Winner	
2012	Toppserien	2	22	15	5	2	70	21	50	Winner	
2013	Toppserien	1	22	17	4	1	64	9	55	Winner	
2014	Toppserien	2	22	16	4	2	62	19	52	Quarter-final	
2015	Toppserien	4	22	10	7	5	32	17	37	Semi-final	
2016	Toppserien	3	22	12	6	4	39	17	42	Quarter-final	
2017	Toppserien	3	22	13	4	5	46	23	43	Quarter-final	
2018	Toppserien	8	22	7	2	13	29	37	23	Third round	
2019	Toppserien	↓ 11	22	3	4	15	16	43	13	Third round	Relegated to 1. divisjon
2020	1. divisjon	↑ 1	18	17	0	1	68	13	51	Quarter-final	Promoted to Toppserien
2021	Toppserien	7	18	5	2	11	15	36	17	Third round	
2022	Toppserien	4	18	8	3	7	23	22	27	Final	
2022	Toppserien	4	6	0	0	6	2	20	0	Final	
2023	Toppserien	5	27	10	7	10	41	43	37	Fourth round	
2024	Toppserien	5	27	11	4	12	40	38	37	Third round	
2025	Toppserien	5	27	12	4	11	31	37	40	Third round	
2026	Toppserien	6	22	9	3	10	39	26	30	Semi-final	

== Achievements ==
- Toppserien
  - Champions (2): 2010, 2013
  - Runners-up (4): 2009, 2011, 2012, 2014
  - Third (2): 2016, 2017
- Norwegian Women's Cup
  - Winners (3): 2011, 2012, 2013
  - Runners-up (1): 2022

== Players ==
=== Current squad ===
As of 29 July 2025

Note: Flags indicate national team as defined under FIFA eligibility rules; some limited exceptions apply. Players may hold more than one non-FIFA nationality.

No.	Pos.	Nation	Player
1	GK	NOR	Martine Leonards
2	DF	NOR	Emilie Bølviken
3	DF	NOR	Henriette de Lange
4	MF	NOR	Thea Loennecken
5	DF	NOR	Silje Bjørneboe
7	MF	NOR	Mathea Berg-Solemdal
8	MF	NOR	Emilie Østerås
9	FW	KOR	Jeong Da-bin
11	FW	NOR	Ida Mortensen Natvik
13	DF	SWE	Fanny Lång
14	DF	NOR	Tiril Flokketveit
15	MF	NOR	Anastasia Høgevold
16	DF	NOR	Silje Skaara Helgesen

No.	Pos.	Nation	Player
17	FW	SWE	Amanda Johnsson Haahr
19	MF	NOR	Andrea Anderdal
20	MF	NOR	Selma Hernes
21	DF	NOR	Sandra Pallesen-Nygård
22	GK	NOR	Sunniva Skoglund
23	DF	NOR	Mille Helland Flø
24	FW	NOR	Guro Hammer Røn
30	MF	NOR	Elida Holvik Kolbjørnsen
32	DF	NOR	Selma Lie
40	MF	NOR	Anna Malmin
51	FW	NOR	Iris Omarsdottir
80	MF	NOR	Celia Lind Halvorsen
95	FW	NOR	Maren Hagfors Thoresen

=== Out on loan ===
Note: Flags indicate national team as defined under FIFA eligibility rules; some limited exceptions apply. Players may hold more than one non-FIFA nationality.

No.	Pos.	Nation	Player
6	DF	NOR	Lena Soleng Hansen (at Como until 30 June 2025)

== Managers ==
Period	Manager
2009	Jan Aksel Opsahl Odden
2010–2011	Roger Finjord
2012–2016	Øyvind Eide
2017–2019	Vanja Stefanovic
2019	Martin Lindmark and Ingvild Stensland (caretakers)
2019–2022	Per Inge Jacobsen
2023	Petter Belsvik
2024–	Jan Jönsson
