= 2014 Toppserien =

Toppserien
- Season: 2014
- Champions: LSK Kvinner
- Relegated: Grand Bodø
- Matches: 114
- Goals: 388 (3.4 per match)
- Top goalscorer: Debinha (20 goals)
- Biggest home win: Avaldsnes IL 10–0 Grand Bodø
- Biggest away win: Grand Bodø 0–7 Stabæk; Medkila 1–7 Arna-Bjørnar
- Highest scoring: Avaldsnes IL 10–0 Grand Bodø
- Longest winning run: 8 games - LSK Kvinner
- Longest unbeaten run: 12 games - LSK Kvinner
- Longest winless run: 14 games - Grand Bodø
- Longest losing run: 8 games - Grand Bodø

The 2014 Toppserien was the 31st season of top-tier women's football in Norway. A total of 12 teams are contesting the league, eleven returning from the 2013 season and the one teams promoted from the First Division, Grand Bodø.

The season started on 21 April 2014 and ended on 1 November 2014.

Locations of the teams in the 2013 Toppserien

== Teams ==
Team	Location	Arena	Manager
Amazon Grimstad	Grimstad	Levermyr Stadion	Margunn Haugenes
Arna-Bjørnar	Bergen	Arna Stadion	Morten Kalvenes
Avaldsnes	Avaldsnes	Avaldsnes Idrettssenter	Roar Wold
Kolbotn	Kolbotn	Sofiemyr Stadion	David Brocken
Klepp	Kleppe	Klepp Stadion	Tommy Velde
Lillestrøm	Lillestrøm	LSK-Hallen	Monica Knudsen
Medkila	Harstad	Harstad Stadion	Roy Berntsen
Røa	Oslo	Røa Kunstgress	Geir Nordby
Grand Bodø	Bodø	Nordlandshallen	Trond Schjølberg
Stabæk	Bærum	Nadderud Stadion	Øyvind Eide
Trondheims-Ørn	Trondheim	DnB NOR Arena	Thomas Dahle
Vålerenga	Oslo	Vallhall Arena	Cecilie Berg-Hansen

== League table ==
Pos	Team	Pld	W	D	L	GF	GA	GD	Pts	Qualification or relegation
1	LSK Kvinner (C)	22	18	3	1	64	14	+50	57	Qualification for the Champions League round of 32
2	Stabæk	22	16	4	2	62	19	+43	52	
3	Arna-Bjørnar	22	14	0	8	58	21	+37	42	
4	Kolbotn	22	13	0	9	41	32	+9	39	
5	Avaldsnes	22	12	2	8	56	27	+29	38	
6	Røa	22	9	5	8	36	27	+9	32	
7	Vålerenga	22	9	3	10	27	45	−18	30	
8	Trondheims-Ørn	22	7	6	9	33	37	−4	27	
9	Klepp	22	8	2	12	32	45	−13	26	
10	Medkila	22	4	3	15	18	62	−44	15	
11	Amazon Grimstad (O)	22	4	2	16	18	60	−42	14	Qualification for the relegation play-offs
12	Grand Bodø (R)	22	1	4	17	15	71	−56	7	Relegation to First Division

Source: NIFS
Rules for classification: 1) points; 2) goal difference; 3) number of goals scored.
(C) Champions; (O) Play-off winners; (R) Relegated

== Top goalscorers ==
Rank	Player	Club	Goals
1	(Brazil) Debinha	Avaldsnes	20
2	(Norway) Cecilie Pedersen	Avaldsnes	16
2	(Norway) Emilie Haavi	LSK Kvinner	16
4	(Norway) Isabell Herlovsen	LSK Kvinner	15
5	(Norway) Hege Hansen	Arna-Bjørnar	14
6	(Norway) Synne Sofie Jensen	Kolbotn	13
6	(Norway) Melissa Bjånesøy	Stabæk	13
8	(Norway) Elise Thorsnes	Stabæk	11
8	(Norway) Tina Algrøy	Arna-Bjørnar	11
8	(Norway) Lene Mykjåland	LSK Kvinner	11
