= Arna-Bjørnar =

Norwegian football club

- Full name: Arna-Bjørnar Fotball
- Founded: 2000; 26 years ago
- Ground: Arna Idrettpark, Indre Arna
- Capacity: 1,200
- Chairman: Torbjørn Andersen
- Manager: Erik Mjelde
- League: 2025 1.div kvinner
- 2024: Toppserien, 10th of 10
Home colours	Away colours

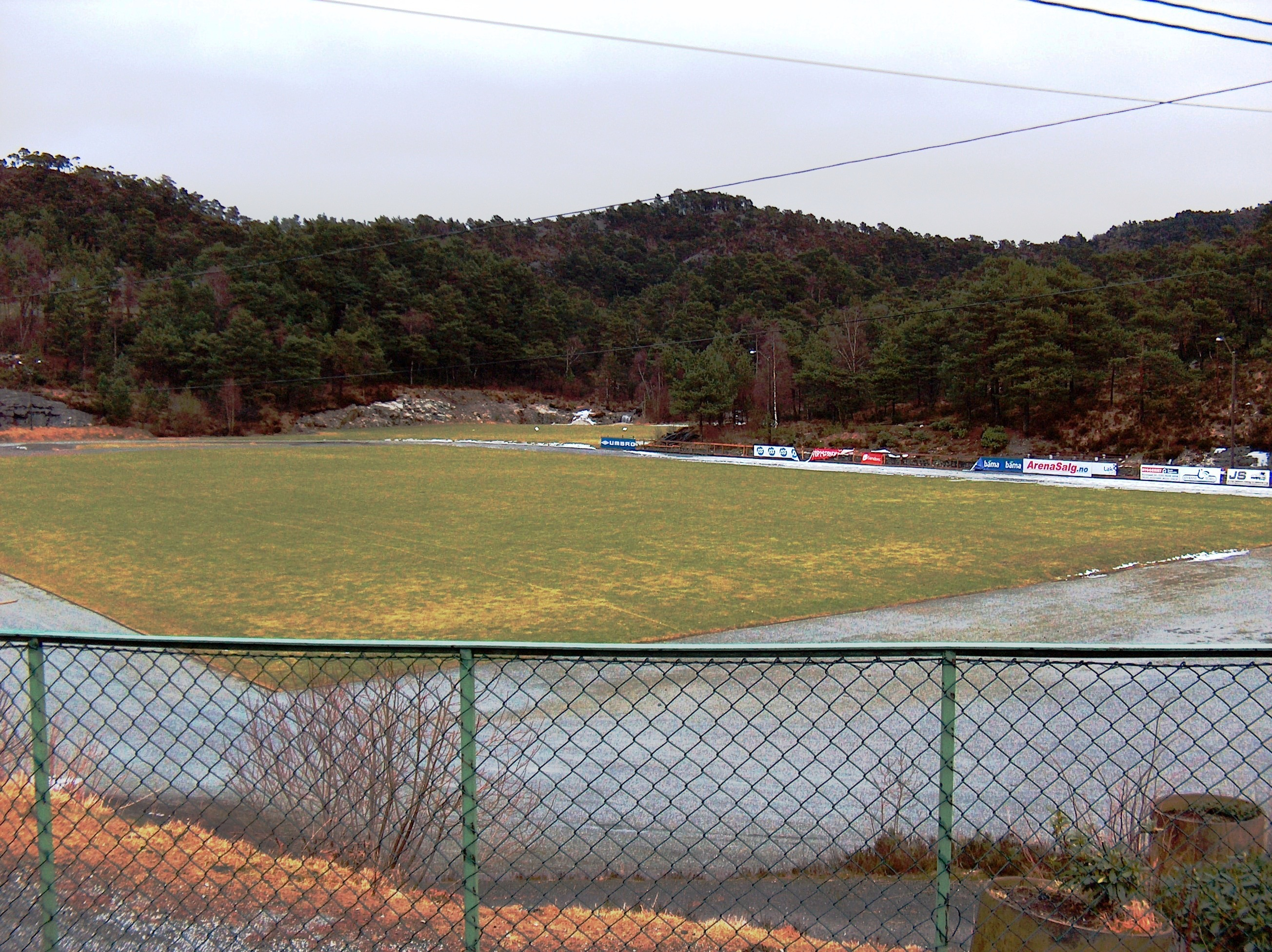
Arna Stadion

Arna-Bjørnar Fotball is a Norwegian football club from Arna, Bergen.

It was founded in late 2000 as a merger between the football branches from IL Bjørnar and Arna T&IL, and replaced Bjørnar IL in the league system from 2001. The women's team has played since then in the Toppserien apart from the 2005 season when it was in the 1.divisjon.

Prominent members of the women's team (2009) are goalkeepers Reidun Seth and Erika Skarbø, and Nigerian keeper Precious Dede brought in to cover while Skarbø recovers from a long-term wrist injury. Arna-Bjørnar has earned a reputation for developing young players and the squad includes the former and current Norway Under-19 captains, Maren Mjelde and Kristine Hegland, and prominent former Under-19 players Caroline Walde and Ingrid Ryland, both now Under-23 players, as well as senior international Madeleine Giske who played in the FIFA Women's World Cup 2007. The team has players in Norway's Under-17 team also.

Arna-Bjørnar's women's team is trained by Morten Kalvenes, brother of former Burnley player Christian Kalvenes.

In February 2011 the club had 13 players selected for Norway's international teams at senior level, Under-23, Under-19 and Under-17.

The men's team currently plays in the 4. divisjon. They last played in the Norwegian Football Cup in 2019, losing 6-1 to Brann in the first round.

== Women's team ==
=== Recent history ===
Season		Pos.	Pl.	W	D	L	GS	GA	P	Cup	Notes
2001	TS	3	18	13	2	3	41	27	41	Semi-final	
2002	TS	5	18	8	2	8	44	38	26	Runner-up	
2003	TS	6	18	6	4	8	43	48	22	Third round	
2004	TS	↓ 9	18	4	1	13	31	54	13	Quarter-final	Relegated to 1. divisjon
2005	1D	↑ 1	18	17	1	0	89	10	52	Third round	Promoted to Toppserien
2006	TS	5	18	11	2	5	60	26	35	Quarter-final	
2007	TS	4	22	12	4	6	47	34	40	Semi-final	
2008	TS	5	22	12	5	5	58	26	41	Quarter-final	
2009	TS	5	22	9	6	7	37	35	33	Quarter-final	
2010	TS	4	22	14	1	7	55	26	43	Semi-final	
2011	TS	4	22	16	1	5	64	19	49	Quarter-final	
2012	TS	3	22	14	5	3	61	21	47	Semi-final	
2013	TS	3	22	10	8	4	39	24	38	Quarter-final	
2014	TS	3	22	14	0	8	58	21	42	Second round	
2015	TS	7	22	7	5	10	35	45	26	Third round	
2016	TS	8	22	7	4	11	22	38	25	Third round	
2017	TS	6	22	9	8	5	39	28	35	Semi-final	
2018	TS	3	22	11	6	5	53	26	39	Quarter-final	
2019	TS	9	22	6	5	11	26	41	23	Semi-final	
2020	TS	8	18	5	2	11	13	29	17	Quarter-final	
2021	TS	5	18	6	3	9	27	44	21	Third round	
2022	TS	8	18	4	2	12	18	53	14	Third round	
2022	TS	2	7	4	2	1	17	6	14	Third round	
2023	TS	10	27	4	4	19	32	70	16	Third round	Avoided relegation
2024	TS	↓ 10	27	2	9	16	17	62	15	Second round	Relegated to 1. divisjon
2025 (in progress)	1D	5	17	7	4	6	28	29	25	Third round	

=== Players ===
==== Current women's squad ====
As of 18 May 2024.

Note: Flags indicate national team as defined under FIFA eligibility rules; some limited exceptions apply. Players may hold more than one non-FIFA nationality.

No.	Pos.	Nation	Player
1	GK	NOR	Benedicte Lund Berge
2	DF	BIH	Samra Muhic
3	MF	NOR	Alva Skåla
4	DF	NOR	Tora Ose
6	DF	NOR	Stine Hovland (captain)
8	MF	NOR	Nora Nøss
9	FW	NOR	Vilde Drange Veglo
10	FW	NOR	Linnéa Laupstad
13	MF	NOR	Marie Hella Andresen
14	FW	NOR	Ada Henschien

No.	Pos.	Nation	Player
15	DF	NOR	Helle Sternesen
15	MF	NOR	Isabel Nielsen Sæbø
16	MF	NOR	Malin Dalsgård
17	MF	NOR	Emma Sivertsen
18	DF	NOR	Anna Nigårdsøy
19	FW	NOR	Linnea Sælen
22	FW	NOR	Sofie Bjørnsen
24	GK	NOR	Hanne Larsen
99	GK	NOR	Nora Gjøen-Gjøsæter
—	FW	NOR	Vilde Vedeler

=== Honours ===
- Toppserien
  - Third (5): 2001, 2012, 2013, 2014, 2018
- Norwegian Women's Cup
  - Runners-up (2): 2000, 2002

== Men's team ==
=== Recent seasons ===
Season		Pos.	Pl.	W	D	L	GS	GA	P	Cup	Notes
2001	3. divisjon	7	22	8	3	11	37	50	27		
2002	3. divisjon	9	22	6	3	13	37	51	21	First round	
2003	3. divisjon	8	22	8	4	10	45	55	28	First qualifying round	
2004	3. divisjon	6	22	10	3	9	37	49	33	First round	
2005	3. divisjon	3	22	12	3	7	49	38	39	First qualifying round	
2006	3. divisjon	2	20	12	1	7	41	30	37	First qualifying round	
2007	3. divisjon	7	22	9	2	11	44	53	29	Second qualifying round	
2008	3. divisjon	10	22	7	3	12	48	58	24	Second qualifying round	
2009	3. divisjon	4	22	11	2	9	41	43	35	First qualifying round	
2010	3. divisjon	3	22	14	1	7	67	36	43	First round	
2011	3. divisjon	6	26	12	4	10	52	41	42	Second qualifying round	
2012	3. divisjon	↑ 1	26	19	4	3	83	32	61	Second round	Promoted to the 2. divisjon
2013	2. divisjon	↓ 14	26	8	1	17	28	67	25	First round	Relegated to the 3. divisjon
2014	3. divisjon	11	26	7	6	13	36	57	27	Second qualifying round	
2015	3. divisjon	8	26	9	4	13	39	63	31	First qualifying round	
2016	3. divisjon	↓ 8	24	7	6	11	43	57	27	Second qualifying round	Relegated to 4. divisjon
2017	4. divisjon	2	22	15	6	1	65	31	34	Second qualifying round	
2018	4. divisjon	2	22	13	7	2	61	32	46	First round	
2019	4. divisjon	2	22	14	3	5	55	31	45	First round	
2020	4. divisjon	No season due to Corona Virus Pandemic									
2021	4. divisjon	2	10	7	0	3	29	12	21		
2022	4. divisjon	4	22	12	2	8	51	40	38	Second Qualifying round	
2023	4. divisjon	2	22	15	4	3	72	32	49	Second Qualifying round	
2024	4. divisjon	2	22	13	3	6	53	35	42	First Qualifying round	
