= Kattem IL =

Norwegian sports club

Kattem
- Full name: Kattem Idrettslag
- Founded: 1979
- Ground: Åsheim kunstgress, Trondheim
- Chairman: Per Wold
- Manager: Steinar Mikkelsen
- League: Toppserien
- 2012: Toppserien, 11th
Home colours	Away colours

Kattem IL is a Norwegian sports club from the neighborhood Kattem in Heimdal borough, Trondheim. It has sections for football, handball, ice hockey and skiing.

The women's football team has been in Toppserien, the highest tier of women's football in Norway. It gained promotion after the 2006 season after one year in the First Division (second tier), having been relegated in 2005.

The men's team won played in the Third Division (fourth tier) in from 2007 to 2010.

== Recent history ==
Season		Pos.	Pl.	W	D	L	GS	GA	P	Cup	Notes
2006	1D	2	18	13	4	1	41	26	43	3rd round	Promoted to Toppserien
2007	TS	10	22	5	4	13	24	55	19	3rd round	
2008	TS	10	22	5	2	15	21	67	17	2nd round	
2009	TS	9	22	7	4	11	28	45	25	3rd round	
2010	TS	10	22	4	2	16	17	58	14	2nd round	
2011	TS	9	22	5	4	13	36	60	19	3rd round	
2012	TS	11	22	5	3	14	34	56	16	3rd round	
