= Amazon Grimstad =

Norwegian football club

- Full name: Amazon Grimstad Fotballklubb
- Founded: 1999
- Ground: Levermyr stadion, Grimstad
- Capacity: 1,800
- Chairman: Jens Anders Ravnaas
- Manager: Steinar Pedersen
- Coach: Olli Harder
- League: 1. divisjon
- 2020: 1. divisjon 7th
Home colours

Amazon Grimstad FK is a Professional Norwegian women's football club from Grimstad. It is named after the Amazons of Greek mythology.

It was founded in 1999 when the women's football section split from FK Jerv. The senior team currently plays in the Norwegian First Division following relegation from the Toppserien at the conclusion of the 2015 Toppserien.

== Recent history ==
Season		Pos.	Pl.	W	D	L	GS	GA	P	Cup	Notes
2006	TS	6	18	7	2	9	29	32	23	3rd round	
2007	TS	8	22	7	5	10	29	46	26	quarter-final	
2008	TS	8	22	7	4	11	30	45	25	3rd round	
2009	TS	10	22	7	1	14	14	33	22	quarter-final	
2010	TS	8	22	9	2	11	28	43	29	quarter-final	
2011	TS	7	22	8	3	11	33	42	27	3rd round	
2012	TS	10	22	5	5	12	25	35	20	semi-final	
2013	TS	11	22	3	6	13	22	39	15	3rd round	
2014	TS	11	22	4	2	16	18	59	14	1st round	
2015	TS	↓ 12	22	4	4	14	22	50	15	3rd round	Relegated
2016	D1	10	22	7	1	14	23	55	22	2nd round	
2017	D1	9	22	8	2	12	31	47	26	2nd round	
2018	D1	6	22	8	5	9	37	38	29	2nd round	
2019	D1	5	22	11	1	10	51	36	34	3rd round	
2020	D1	7	18	6	2	10	25	38	20	1st round	

== 2015 squad ==
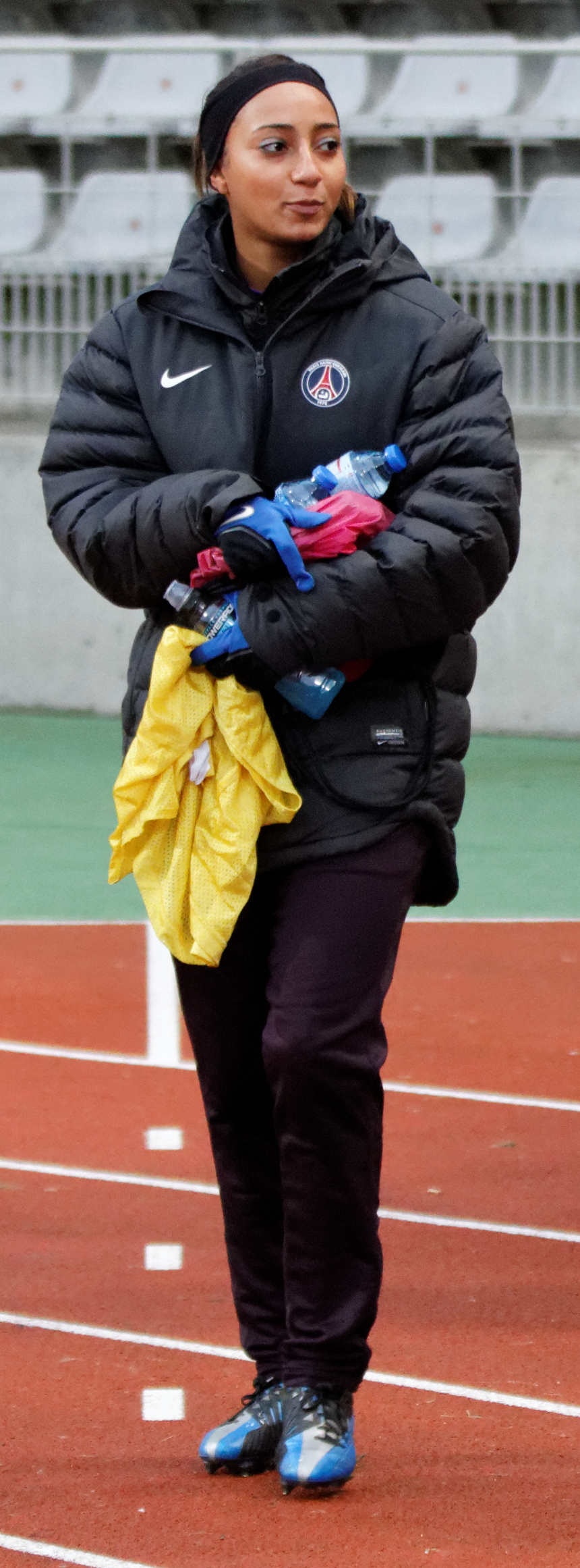
Saïda Akherraze

As of 12 April 2015.

No.	Position	Nation	Player
1	GK	NOR	Karoline Sævareid
3	DF	NOR	Gro Ingvardsen
6	FW	NOR	Eline Glamsland
7	MF	NOR	Stina Kleppe
8	FW	NOR	Heidi Eikeland
10	FW	NOR	Trine Lise Åvik
11	DF	IRL	Emma Salomonsson
13	DF	USA	Kelsey Hood
15	DF	USA	Rachel Breton
16	DF	NOR	Lisbeth Rothschild
17	MF	GER	Mona Lohmann
18	MF	ENG	Georgia France
19	MF	NOR	Kristine Meland
20	MF	NOR	Linn Farbergshagen
21	MF	NOR	Silje Blakstad
22	GK	DEN	Line Geltzer Johansen
29	MF	IRL	Emma Beckett
