= Klepp IL =

Norwegian sports club

Klepp
- Full name: Klepp Idrettslag
- Founded: 1 October 1919; 106 years ago
- Ground: Klepp Stadion, Kleppe
- Manager: Nick Loftus
- League: 1. divisjon
- 2021: Toppserien, 10th of 10 (relegated)
Home colours	Away colours

Klepp IL is a Norwegian sports club from Klepp Municipality. It was founded on 1 October 1919, and has sections for football, handball and gymnastics as well as the less active sections for athletics and orienteering.

Best known for their women's football team, Klepp Elite women currently play in the Toppserien, and have the distinction of being in the Norwegian top flight since its inception. Additionally, Klepp Elite have won the league in 1987 and 1989. Klepp Elite have also won the National Championship Norgesmester for Junior Girls U19 more than any other club, winning in 2008, 2011, 2016, 2018, and most recently in 2019. Among its most famous former players are Birthe Hegstad, Dagny Mellgren and Ane Stangeland Horpestad.

The men's football team currently plays in the Third Division (fourth tier), having last played in the Second Division back in 2006.

Gymnast Åge Storhaug was a member of Klepp IL.

== Recent seasons ==
Season		Pos.	Pl.	W	D	L	GS	GA	P	Cup	Notes
2006	TS	9	18	3	2	13	17	60	11	quarter-final	
2007	TS	7	22	8	4	10	35	30	28	quarter-final	
2008	TS	6	22	8	7	7	41	30	31	quarter-final	
2009	TS	7	22	8	6	8	39	38	30	semi-final	
2010	TS	7	22	8	5	9	34	29	29	3rd round	
2011	TS	8	22	6	5	11	28	37	23	quarter-final	
2012	TS	7	22	7	5	10	41	41	26	3rd round	
2013	TS	10	22	6	3	13	29	50	21	quarter-final	
2014	TS	9	22	8	2	12	32	45	26	quarter-final	
2015	TS	6	22	8	6	8	36	46	30	3rd round	
2016	TS	10	22	6	2	14	32	49	20	3rd round	
2017	TS	4	22	12	4	6	34	24	40	quarter-final	
2018	TS	2	22	15	3	4	39	21	48	semi-final	
2019	TS	3	22	14	2	6	48	19	44	3rd round	
2020	TS	7	18	5	3	10	19	33	18	1st round	
2021	TS	↓ 10	18	2	1	15	12	53	7	quarter-final	Relegated

== Players ==
=== Current squad ===
As of 23 March 2023.

No.	Position	Nation	Player
2	DF	AUS	Nikola Orgill
6	DF	NOR	Marte Gjellan Leine
8	MF	NOR	Marie Hella Andresen
9	FW	USA	Olivia Nguyen
12	DF	NOR	Halene Broch
14	MF	NOR	Mille Aune
16	MF	NOR	Sofie Bjørnsen
19	FW	NOR	Hege Hansen
20	DF	NOR	Anette Snørteland Jensen
21	DF	NOR	Kaja Karlsen
24	FW	NOR	Ingeborg Lye Skretting
25	DF	NOR	Susanne Vistnes
26	MF	NOR	Miriam Byberg
28	MF	NOR	Julie Austdal
30	FW	NOR	Madeleine Hille Mellemstrand
33	MF	GER	Tilja Ellingsen
41	GK	NOR	Amalie Reed Kolnes

=== Honours ===
- 1. divisjon/Eliteserien/Toppserien
  - Champions (1): 1987
  - Runners-up (2): 1988, 2018
  - Third (6): 1986, 1989, 1990, 1997, 1999, 2019
- Norwegian Women's Cup
  - Winners (1): 1989
  - Runners-up (3): 1987, 1996, 1997
