= LSK Kvinner FK =

Norwegian football club

LSK Kvinner
- Full name: LSK Kvinner Fotballklubb
- Founded: 10 October 1989; 37 years ago
- Ground: LSK-Hallen; Lillestrøm; Norway
- Capacity: 1,500
- Chairman: Per Kristiansen
- Manager: André Bergdølmo
- League: Toppserien
- 2026: Toppserien, 11th of 12 (relegated)
Home colours	Away colours

LSK Kvinner Fotballklubb is a Norwegian women's football club from Lillestrøm. They currently play in Toppserien, the top division of Norwegian football. The club was founded as Setskog/Høland Fotballklubb on 10 October 1989.

== History ==
Logo between 2001 and 2009 as Team Strømmen FK

The club was founded in 1989 as a merger between the women's football branches of Setskog IF and Høland IL. It was known as Setskog/Høland FK and played their home games on AHF-banen in Bjørkelangen, Aurskog-Høland.

Before the 2001 season the club was relocated from Bjørkelangen to Strømmen and the name was changed to Team Strømmen. Team Strømmen finished the 2008 season in 2nd position in Toppserien, the top division of Norwegian football. They lost 1–3 against league champions Røa IL in the Norwegian Cup final on Bislett Stadion on 8 November 2008.

From 2010 the club has been an alliance club of Lillestrøm SK. Thus changing its name to LSK Kvinner FK, as well as the logo and kits likewise. LSK Kvinner won six consecutive Toppserien titles from 2014 to 2019.

At Lillestrøm Sportsklubb's annual meeting on 23 March 2022, a controversial proposal was made to merge LSK Kvinner FK into Lillestrøm Sportsklubb. When the annual meetings of both clubs decided to incorporate Team Strømmen as an alliance club in 2009, there was an ambition for the clubs to eventually merge. However, this never happened, and when the new merger proposal surfaced in 2022, it sparked a debate about the relationship between the two clubs. At Lillestrøm Sportsklubb's extraordinary annual meeting on 30 November, the proposal was rejected with 151 votes against and only 7 votes in favour of the merger. After this failed merger process, LSK Kvinner FK began exploring other clubs due to financial difficulties. On 29 May 2024, the club signed a letter of intent with Lørenskog IF regarding a potential merger. However, Lørenskog IF ultimately withdrew from the agreement.

== Recent seasons ==
Season		Pos.	Pl.	W	D	L	GS	GA	P	Cup	Notes
2005	TS	2	18	12	3	3	44	22	39	Runner-up	
2006	TS	4	18	12	2	4	46	25	38	Quarter-final	
2007	TS	5	22	10	6	6	37	29	36	Quarter-final	
2008	TS	2	22	14	4	4	44	22	46	Runner-up	
2009	TS	4	22	11	3	8	48	31	36	Runner-up	Last season as Team Strømmen FK
2010	TS	6	22	11	3	8	42	32	36	Semi-final	First season as LSK Kvinner FK
2011	TS	5	22	13	1	8	47	42	40	Quarter-final	
2012	TS	1	22	18	2	2	66	17	56	Quarter-final	
2013	TS	2	22	15	4	3	51	18	49	Semi-final	
2014	TS	1	22	18	3	1	64	14	57	Winner	
2015	TS	1	22	18	2	2	58	16	56	Winner	
2016	TS	1	22	19	3	0	88	10	60	Winner	
2017	TS	1	22	19	2	1	68	18	59	Semi-final	
2018	TS	1	22	20	1	1	71	15	61	Winner	
2019	TS	1	22	15	5	2	51	18	50	Winner	
2020	TS	5	18	9	2	7	29	23	29	Runner-up	
2021	TS	3	18	12	1	5	46	32	37	Semi-final	
2022	TS	7	18	6	5	7	23	21	23	Fourth round	
2022	TS	3	7	3	2	2	14	9	11	Fourth round	
2023	TS	3	27	16	7	4	44	21	55	Semi-final	
2024	TS	4	27	14	6	7	43	31	44	Second round	
2025	TS	4	27	12	4	11	48	46	40	Quarter-final	
2026	TS	11	22	4	4	14	26	46	16	3rd round	Relegated

== Players ==
=== Current squad ===
As of 4 August 2025

Note: Flags indicate national team as defined under FIFA eligibility rules; some limited exceptions apply. Players may hold more than one non-FIFA nationality.

No.	Pos.	Nation	Player
1	GK	NOR	Klara Sporsem
2	DF	NOR	Josefine Løken
3	MF	PHI	Sara Eggesvik
4	DF	NOR	Marte Hjelmhaug (captain)
5	MF	FIN	Aada Mäkelä
6	MF	NOR	Carina Wik Alfredsen
8	MF	NOR	Kaja Hjelmhaug
9	FW	NOR	Mari Nyhagen
10	MF	NOR	Mille Ivi Christensen
11	FW	NOR	Thea Kyvåg
12	FW	NOR	Christina Herseth

No.	Pos.	Nation	Player
15	DF	NOR	Linnea Tveit
16	DF	NOR	Andrea Holmstrøm
17	DF	DEN	Sarah Tofft (on loan from Nordsjælland)
18	FW	NOR	Sara Hoftun Bjerksæter
19	DF	FIN	Jasmin Mansaray
22	FW	NOR	Luana Cotrau
24	GK	NOR	Emma Lykke Sjåfjell
33	MF	NOR	Tilde Andersson
35	FW	NOR	Emma Reshane
99	MF	NOR	Tonje Erikstein

== Honours ==
- Toppserien
  - Champions (7): 2012, 2014, 2015, 2016, 2017, 2018, 2019
  - Runners-up (5): 1992, 1995, 2005, 2008, 2013
- Norwegian Women's Cup
  - Winners (6): 1992, 2014, 2015, 2016, 2018, 2019
  - Runners-up (3): 2005, 2008, 2009, 2020
- UEFA Competitions
  - Quarter-final in UEFA Women's Champions League: 2018–19

== European record ==
UEFA Women's Champions League:

- 2009–10: Qualifying round (as Team Strømmen)
- 2013–14: Round of 32
- 2015–16: Round of 16
- 2016–17: Round of 32
- 2017–18: Round of 16
- 2018–19: Quarter-finals
- 2019–20: Qualifying round
