= IL Sandviken =

Norwegian sports club

Sandviken
- Full name: Idrettslaget Sandviken
- Founded: 29 June 1945; 81 years ago
- Ground: Stemmemyren idrettsplass, Bergen
- Manager: Alexander Stockinger
- League: Second Division
- 2024: Third Division group 1, 1st of 14 (promoted)
- Website: https://ilsandviken.no/
| Home colours | Away colours | Third colours |

Idrettslaget Sandviken is a Norwegian sports club from the neighborhood of Sandviken in Bergenhus borough, Bergen. It has sections for basketball, football and handball.

It was mostly known for its women's football team that played in the Toppserien. It won the league in 2021, and the Norwegian Women's Cup in 1995. The team was renamed SK Brann Kvinner ahead of the 2022 season.

The men's football team currently resides in the Norwegian Second Division, the third tier of the Norwegian football league system.

== Current squad ==
As of 3 September 2026

Note: Flags indicate national team as defined under FIFA eligibility rules; some limited exceptions apply. Players may hold more than one non-FIFA nationality.

| No. | Pos. | Nation | Player |
|---|---|---|---|
| 1 | GK | NOR | Isak Solberg |
| 3 | DF | NOR | Henrik Flagtvedt |
| 3 | DF | NOR | Markus Bergstrøm |
| 4 | DF | NOR | Nicholas Martinusen |
| 5 | DF | NOR | Markus Helland Tislevoll |
| 6 | DF | NOR | Lionel Kamanzi |
| 7 | MF | NOR | Lars Dalstø |
| 8 | FW | NOR | Oscar Bakke Hodne |
| 9 | MF | NOR | Vebjørn Høynes |
| 10 | MF | NOR | Sebastian Skåre Tune |
| 11 | FW | NOR | Bendik Engen |
| 12 | GK | NOR | Aksel Bergsvik (on loan from Hødd) |
| 14 | DF | NOR | Anders Njøs |
| 15 | FW | NOR | Joakim Aasen (on loan from Åsane) |

| No. | Pos. | Nation | Player |
|---|---|---|---|
| 16 | DF | NOR | Mats Alexander Røtvold-Leenaars |
| 17 | FW | NOR | Kristoffer Aasen Garmann |
| 18 | FW | NOR | Markus Ottesen |
| 19 | FW | NOR | Herman Stang Stakset |
| 20 | FW | NOR | Jakob Hellevik-Lie |
| 21 | MF | NOR | Casper Thorsen |
| 22 | MF | ESP | Samuel Villalta Huesa |
| 23 | MF | NOR | Henrik Østrått |
| 24 | DF | NOR | Thorvald Trætteberg |
| 25 | MF | NOR | Marcus Devik |
| 26 | DF | NOR | Magnus Bruun-Hansen |
| 27 | MF | NOR | Thomas Lotsberg |
| 67 | FW | BDI | Beltran Mvuka |
| 77 | FW | NOR | David Sissoko |
| — | DF | NOR | Tom-Rune Sæle |
