= 2020 Toppserien =

37th season of top women's football (soccer) league in Norway

Toppserien
- Season: 2020
- Dates: 3 July 2020 – 6 December 2020
- Champions: Vålerenga
- Relegated: Røa
- UEFA Women's Champions League: Vålerenga; Rosenborg
- Matches: 90
- Goals: 251 (2.79 per match)
- Top goalscorer: Ajara Nchout (10 goals)
- Biggest home win: Vålerenga 7–0 Klepp (27 September 2020)
- Biggest away win: Røa 1–5 Lillestrøm (17 July 2020)
- Highest scoring: Vålerenga 7–0 Klepp (27 September 2020) Avalsdnes 5–2 Lyn (4 July 2020)
- All statistics correct as of 6 December 2020.

The 2020 Toppserien was the 37th season of the highest women's football league in Norway. The season was to start initially on 21 March 2020 but due to the effects of the COVID-19 pandemic, it was delayed. It finally commenced on 3 July 2020 and ended on 6 December 2020. This season featured just 10 teams.

Vålerenga won their first Toppserien title on goal difference after finishing second the previous season.

== Format ==
The league consisted of 10 teams this season, which played each other twice (home and away) totalling 18 matches for a team.

== Teams ==
Locations of teams in the 2020 Toppserien

=== Teams information ===
Team	Home city	Home ground	Seasons
Arna-Bjørnar	Indre Arna (Bergen)	Arna Idrettspark	19
Avaldsnes	Avaldsnes	Avaldsnes Idrettssenter	8
Klepp	Kleppe	Klepp Stadion	34
Kolbotn	Kolbotn	Sofiemyr	26
LSK Kvinner	Lillestrøm	LSK-Hallen	34
Lyn	Oslo	Kringsjå kunstgress	3
Røa	Oslo	Røa kunstgress	21
Rosenborg	Trondheim	Koteng Arena	34
Sandviken	Bergen	Stemmemyren	27
Vålerenga	Oslo	Intility Arena	9

== League table ==
Pos	Team	Pld	W	D	L	GF	GA	GD	Pts	Qualification or relegation
1	Vålerenga (C)	18	11	5	2	39	14	+25	38	Qualification for the Champions League first round
2	Rosenborg	18	10	8	0	34	16	+18	38	Qualification for the Champions League first round
3	Avaldsnes	18	10	4	4	31	21	+10	34	
4	Sandviken	18	9	3	6	29	23	+6	30	
5	LSK Kvinner	18	9	2	7	29	23	+6	29	
6	Lyn	18	6	3	9	24	30	−6	21	
7	Klepp	18	5	3	10	19	33	−14	18	
8	Arna-Bjørnar	18	5	2	11	13	29	−16	17	
9	Kolbotn (O)	18	2	7	9	18	29	−11	13	Qualification for the relegation play-offs
10	Røa (R)	18	3	3	12	15	33	−18	12	Relegation to First Division

Source: Norges Fotballforbund (in Norwegian)
Rules for classification: 1) Points; 2) Goal difference; 3) Number of goals scored; 4) Head-to-head points; 5) Head-to-head goal difference; 6) Head-to-head away goals scored
(C) Champions; (O) Play-off winners; (R) Relegated

== Results ==
=== Matches ===
Home \ Away	ARN	AVA	KLE	KOL	LSK	LYN	ROA	ROS	SAN	VAL
Arna-Bjørnar	—	0–2	0–1	2–1	1–0	2–1	0–0	1–2	0–1	0–3
Avaldsnes	1–0	—	3–0	2–1	1–0	5–2	4–0	1–1	1–3	0–0
Klepp	2–1	1–2	—	0–0	2–3	1–0	0–1	1–2	3–2	1–2
Kolbotn	2–3	2–2	2–2	—	1–1	1–0	2–1	2–2	1–3	0–0
LSK Kvinner	2–1	1–3	3–0	3–1	—	0–1	2–0	0–1	1–0	1–3
Lyn	4–0	1–1	1–3	1–0	2–3	—	1–1	1–4	2–0	3–2
Røa	0–1	0–1	1–0	2–0	1–5	1–3	—	2–3	2–3	1–2
Rosenborg	1–1	3–1	1–1	3–1	1–1	3–0	2–0	—	1–1	0–0
Sandviken	2–0	4–0	2–1	1–0	0–1	1–1	2–2	1–3	—	3–2
Vålerenga	4–0	2–1	7–0	1–1	4–2	2–0	2–0	1–1	2–0	—

Source: Soccerway
Legend: Blue = home team win; Yellow = draw; Red = away team win.

=== Positions by round ===
Team ╲ Round	1	2	3	4	5	6	7	8	9	10	11	12	13	14	15	16	17	18
Vålerenga	8	5	4	3	2	3	1	1	1	1	1	1	1	1	1	1	1	1
Rosenborg	5	2	1	2	3	2	3	2	3	3	3	2	3	2	2	2	2	2
Avaldsnes	1	1	3	4	5	4	5	5	5	4	2	4	4	4	3	3	3	3
Sandviken	2	6	5	5	4	5	4	4	4	5	5	5	5	5	5	5	5	4
LSK Kvinner	4	3	2	1	1	1	2	3	2	2	4	3	2	3	4	4	4	5
Lyn	10	10	9	7	8	8	9	9	9	9	10	9	9	9	9	8	6	6
Klepp	6	4	6	6	7	6	6	7	7	6	6	7	8	7	7	6	7	7
Arna-Bjørnar	3	7	7	8	9	9	8	6	6	7	8	6	6	6	6	7	8	8
Kolbotn	7	8	8	9	6	7	7	8	8	8	7	8	7	8	8	9	9	9
Røa	9	9	10	10	10	10	10	10	10	10	9	10	10	10	10	10	10	10

Leader / Champions League
Champions League
Relegation play-offs
Relegation to 1.divisjon

Source: World football

== Relegation play-offs ==
The league's ninth placed team, Kolbotn, faced Medkila, the 2020 1. divisjon runners-up, in a two-legged play-off to decide who will play in the 2021 Toppserien.

=== 1st leg ===
22 November 2020
13:00

Kolbotn	5–0	Medkila
Skau 2' (o.g.); Holmen 17', 43'; Fridlund 38'; Klæboe 52'	Report

Strømmen Stadion, Strømmen
Referee: Fatemeh Zangeneh

Note- This match was played before the final round of matches as Kolbotn had played theirs a week earlier.

=== 2nd leg ===
25 November 2020
19:00

Medkila	2–1	Kolbotn
Mjåseth 1'; Brustad 54'	Report	Sørsdahl 74'

Harstad stadion, Harstad
Referee: Ingvild Langnes Aarland

Kolbotn won 6–2 on aggregate and both teams remained in their respective leagues.

== Season statistics ==
=== Top scorers ===
Updated to matches played on 6 December 2020

Rank	Player	Club	Goals
1	(Cameroon) Ajara Nchout	Vålerenga	10
2	(Norway) Marit Clausen	Rosenborg	9
2	(Norway) Camilla Linberg	Lyn	9
4	(Norway) Sophie Roman Haug	LSK Kvinner	8
4	(Norway) Elise Thorsnes	Avaldsnes	8
6	(Nigeria) Rasheedat Ajibade	Avaldsnes	7
6	(Norway) Julie Blakstad	Rosenborg	7
6	(Serbia) Dejana Stefanović	Vålerenga	7
9	(Trinidad and Tobago) Kennya Cordner	Sandviken	6
9	(Norway) Lisa-Marie Karlseng Utland	Rosenborg	6

=== Disciplinary ===
==== Players ====
Updated to matches played on 6 December 2020

Rank	Player	Club	Yellow Card	Red Card	Points
1	(Norway) Olaug Tvedten	Avaldsnes	3	1	6
1	(Norway) Emilie Bølviken	Lyn	3	1	6
3	(Serbia) Dejana Stefanović	Vålerenga	5	0	5
3	(Norway) Katrine Emilie Winnem Jørgensen	Røa	5	0	5
3	(Norway) Trine Skjelstad Jensen	Lyn	5	0	5
3	(Norway) Frida Berg Lyshoel	Røa	5	0	5
3	(Norway) Vilde Anett Fjelldal	Røa	5	0	5

Points classification: Yellow card - 1 point, Red card - 3 points.

==== Club ====
Updated to matches played on 6 December 2020

Rank	Club	Yellow Card	Red Card	Points
1	Lyn	28	1	31
2	Arna-Bjørnar	25	1	28
3	Røa	27	0	27
4	Vålerenga	22	1	25
5	Avaldsnes	19	1	22
6	Kolbotn	20	0	20
7	Rosenborg	13	1	16
8	Sandviken	10	0	10
8	LSK Kvinner	10	0	10
8	Klepp	10	0	10

Points classification: Yellow card - 1 point, Red card - 3 points

=== Awards ===
Award	Winner	
Best Player Award	(Norway) Emilie Haavi	LSK Kvinner
Top Scorer	(Cameroon) Ajara Nchout	Vålerenga
Best Goalkeeper	(Australia) Teagan Micah	Arna-Bjørnar

Best XI
Goalkeeper	(Australia) Teagan Micah (Arna-Bjørnar)			
Defenders	(Norway) Emilie Woldvik (LSK Kvinner)		(Iceland) Ingibjörg Sigurðardóttir (Vålerenga)	(Norway) Rebekka Hansen (Klepp)
Midfielders	(Norway) Emilie Haavi (LSK Kvinner)	(Norway) Lisa Naalsund (Sandviken)	(Netherlands) Sherida Spitse (Vålerenga)	(Nigeria) Rasheedat Ajibade (Avaldsnes)
Forwards	(Norway) Cesilie Andreassen (Rosenborg)		(Norway) Julie Blakstad (Rosenborg)	(Norway) Camilla Linberg (Lyn)
