= 2021 in Norwegian football =

Football in Norway
- Season: 2021

Men's football
- Eliteserien: Bodø/Glimt
- 1. divisjon: HamKam
- 2. divisjon: Kongsvinger (Group 1); Skeid (Group 2)

Women's football
- Toppserien: Sandviken
- 1. divisjon: Røa
- Cupen: Vålerenga

The 2021 season was the 116th season of competitive football in Norway.

The season was scheduled to begin on 1 May 2021.

== Men's football ==
=== League season ===
==== Promotion and relegation ====
League	Promoted to league	Relegated from league
Eliteserien	Tromsø; Lillestrøm	Start; Aalesund
1. divisjon	Fredrikstad; Bryne	Kongsvinger; Øygarden
2. divisjon	none	none

==== Eliteserien ====
Pos	Team	Pld	W	D	L	GF	GA	GD	Pts	Qualification or relegation
1	Bodø/Glimt (C)	30	18	9	3	59	25	+34	63	Qualification for the Champions League first qualifying round
2	Molde	30	18	6	6	70	40	+30	60	Qualification for the Europa Conference League second qualifying round (Note: Since the winners of the 2021 Norwegian Cup, Molde, have already qualified for European competitions based on league position, the last European spot was passed down to the fourth placed team, Lillestrøm.)
3	Viking	30	17	6	7	60	47	+13	57	Qualification for the Europa Conference League second qualifying round
4	Lillestrøm	30	14	7	9	49	40	+9	49	Qualification for the Europa Conference League second qualifying round
5	Rosenborg	30	13	9	8	58	42	+16	48	
6	Kristiansund	30	14	4	12	41	46	−5	46	
7	Vålerenga	30	11	12	7	46	37	+9	45	
8	Sarpsborg 08	30	11	6	13	39	44	−5	39	
9	Strømsgodset	30	9	9	12	43	43	0	36	
10	Sandefjord	30	10	6	14	38	52	−14	36	
11	Haugesund	30	9	8	13	46	45	+1	35	
12	Tromsø	30	8	11	11	33	44	−11	35	
13	Odd	30	8	9	13	44	58	−14	33	
14	Brann (R)	30	5	11	14	38	55	−17	26	Qualification for the relegation play-offs
15	Stabæk (R)	30	6	7	17	35	62	−27	25	Relegation to First Division
16	Mjøndalen (R)	30	4	10	16	33	52	−19	22	Relegation to First Division

Source: Football Association of Norway (in Norwegian)
Rules for classification: 1) Points; 2) Goal difference; 3) Goals scored; 4) Head-to-head points; 5) Head-to-head goal difference; 6) Head-to-head away goals scored (only if between two teams); 7) Head-to-head goals scored; 8) Play-off (only used to decide champions or relegation).
(C) Champions; (R) Relegated

==== 1. divisjon ====
Pos	Team	Pld	W	D	L	GF	GA	GD	Pts	Promotion, qualification or relegation
1	HamKam (C, P)	30	21	6	3	62	21	+41	69	Promotion to Eliteserien
2	Aalesund (P)	30	16	10	4	68	43	+25	58	Promotion to Eliteserien
3	Jerv (O, P)	30	15	9	6	49	46	+3	54	Qualification for the promotion play-offs
4	Fredrikstad	30	15	7	8	60	42	+18	52	Qualification for the promotion play-offs
5	KFUM Oslo	30	12	8	10	46	45	+1	44	Qualification for the promotion play-offs
6	Sogndal	30	11	9	10	40	35	+5	42	Qualification for the promotion play-offs
7	Åsane	30	11	7	12	44	53	−9	40	
8	Sandnes Ulf	30	10	9	11	43	49	−6	39	
9	Start	30	10	8	12	59	59	0	38	
10	Bryne	30	11	4	15	44	48	−4	37	
11	Raufoss	30	10	5	15	51	54	−3	34 (Note: Raufoss have been deducted 1 point.)	
12	Ranheim	30	9	7	14	56	62	−6	34	
13	Grorud	30	10	4	16	45	59	−14	34	
14	Stjørdals-Blink (O)	30	8	7	15	32	50	−18	31	Qualification for the relegation play-offs
15	Ull/Kisa (R)	30	7	8	15	34	50	−16	29	Relegation to Second Division
16	Strømmen (R)	30	4	12	14	32	49	−17	24	Relegation to Second Division

Source: Soccerway, NIFS
Rules for classification: 1) Points; 2) Goal difference; 3) Goals scored; 4) Head-to-head points; 5) Head-to-head goal difference; 6) Head-to-head away goals scored (only if between two teams); 7) Head-to-head goals scored; 8) Play-off (only used to decide champions or relegation).
(C) Champions; (O) Play-off winners; (P) Promoted; (R) Relegated

==== 2. divisjon ====
===== Group 1 =====
Pos	Team	Pld	W	D	L	GF	GA	GD	Pts	Promotion, qualification or relegation
1	Kongsvinger (C, P)	26	22	2	2	88	26	+62	68	Promotion to First Division
2	Hødd	26	18	6	2	67	18	+49	60	Qualification for promotion play-offs
3	Asker	26	15	4	7	60	37	+23	49	
4	Tromsdalen	26	13	6	7	52	34	+18	45	
5	Brattvåg	26	12	5	9	55	48	+7	41	
6	Alta	26	12	5	9	49	47	+2	41	
7	Kvik Halden	26	12	5	9	46	48	−2	41	
8	Eidsvold Turn	26	11	6	9	45	47	−2	39	
9	Bærum	26	9	3	14	41	51	−10	30	
10	Moss	26	8	5	13	44	51	−7	29	
11	Vålerenga 2	26	7	5	14	43	63	−20	26	
12	Florø (R)	26	5	3	18	29	63	−34	18	Relegation to Third Division
13	Fløya (R)	26	2	8	16	29	72	−43	14	Relegation to Third Division
14	Senja (R)	26	2	5	19	22	65	−43	11	Relegation to Third Division

Source: NIFS (in Norwegian)
Rules for classification: 1) Points; 2) Goal difference; 3) Goals scored; 4) Head-to-head points; 5) Head-to-head goal difference; 6) Head-to-head goals scored.
(C) Champions; (P) Promoted; (R) Relegated

===== Group 2 =====
Pos	Team	Pld	W	D	L	GF	GA	GD	Pts	Promotion, qualification or relegation
1	Skeid (C, P)	26	17	5	4	63	22	+41	56	Promotion to First Division
2	Arendal	26	13	9	4	57	38	+19	48	Qualification for promotion play-offs
3	Egersund	26	15	3	8	55	40	+15	48	
4	Levanger	26	13	4	9	65	41	+24	43	
5	Vard Haugesund	26	13	4	9	39	32	+7	43	
6	Notodden	26	11	6	9	53	43	+10	39	
7	Øygarden	26	10	9	7	41	34	+7	39	
8	Odd 2	26	10	4	12	32	42	−10	34	
9	Kjelsås	26	8	9	9	43	44	−1	33	
10	Sotra	26	10	3	13	41	48	−7	33	
11	Fløy-Flekkerøy	26	5	12	9	30	38	−8	27	
12	Fram Larvik (R)	26	6	9	11	33	42	−9	27	Relegation to Third Division
13	Nardo (R)	26	6	6	14	31	55	−24	24	Relegation to Third Division
14	Rosenborg 2 (R)	26	2	3	21	29	93	−64	9	Relegation to Third Division

Source: NIFS (in Norwegian)
Rules for classification: 1) Points; 2) Goal difference; 3) Goals scored; 4) Head-to-head points; 5) Head-to-head goal difference; 6) Head-to-head goals scored.
(C) Champions; (P) Promoted; (R) Relegated

==== 3. divisjon ====
===== Group 1 =====
Pos	Team	Pld	W	D	L	GF	GA	GD	Pts	Promotion or relegation
1	Gjøvik-Lyn (P)	13	13	0	0	49	9	+40	39	Promotion to Second Division
2	Gjelleråsen	13	8	2	3	37	18	+19	26	
3	Elverum	13	7	4	2	27	18	+9	25	
4	Brumunddal	13	7	3	3	33	15	+18	24	
5	Kongsvinger 2	13	7	1	5	32	24	+8	22	
6	Lillestrøm 2	13	6	3	4	27	23	+4	21	
7	Lørenskog	13	5	3	5	18	17	+1	18	
8	Grorud 2	13	4	4	5	21	22	−1	16	
9	Raufoss 2	13	4	2	7	19	30	−11	14	
10	Toten	13	4	2	7	21	42	−21	14	
11	Fu/Vo	13	3	2	8	18	30	−12	11	
12	Nybergsund (R)	13	2	5	6	11	23	−12	11	Relegation to Fourth Division
13	Ull/Kisa 2 (R)	13	2	2	9	12	33	−21	8	Relegation to Fourth Division
14	Stovner (R)	13	1	3	9	12	33	−21	6	Relegation to Fourth Division

Source: NIFS (in Norwegian)
Rules for classification: 1) Points; 2) Goal difference; 3) Goals scored; 4) Head-to-head points; 5) Head-to-head goal difference; 6) Head-to-head goals scored.
(P) Promoted; (R) Relegated

===== Group 2 =====
Pos	Team	Pld	W	D	L	GF	GA	GD	Pts	Promotion or relegation
1	Ørn Horten (P)	13	9	2	2	32	12	+20	29	Promotion to Second Division
2	Eik Tønsberg	13	8	3	2	29	14	+15	27	
3	Pors	13	7	4	2	33	13	+20	25	
4	Hønefoss	13	7	4	2	28	18	+10	25	
5	Oppsal	13	5	4	4	17	20	−3	19	
6	Strømsgodset 2	13	5	3	5	34	29	+5	18	
7	Sarpsborg 08 2	13	5	3	5	26	28	−2	18	
8	Fredrikstad 2	13	4	5	4	28	21	+7	17	
9	Halsen	13	5	1	7	20	33	−13	16	
10	Follo	13	3	6	4	18	14	+4	15	
11	Mjøndalen 2	13	3	6	4	23	20	+3	15	
12	Flint (R)	13	4	3	6	21	26	−5	15	Relegation to Fourth Division
13	Kråkerøy (R)	13	3	1	9	16	32	−16	10	Relegation to Fourth Division
14	Åssiden (R)	13	0	1	12	10	55	−45	1	Relegation to Fourth Division

Source: NIFS (in Norwegian)
Rules for classification: 1) Points; 2) Goal difference; 3) Goals scored; 4) Head-to-head points; 5) Head-to-head goal difference; 6) Head-to-head goals scored.
(P) Promoted; (R) Relegated

===== Group 3 =====
Pos	Team	Pld	W	D	L	GF	GA	GD	Pts	Promotion or relegation
1	Staal Jørpeland (P)	13	8	3	2	30	18	+12	27	Promotion to Second Division
2	Sola	13	8	2	3	34	18	+16	26	
3	Vindbjart	13	8	1	4	32	24	+8	25	
4	Djerv 1919	13	6	4	3	25	18	+7	22	
5	Brodd	13	6	3	4	15	19	−4	21	
6	Viking 2	13	6	2	5	29	20	+9	20	
7	Start 2	13	5	4	4	24	15	+9	19	
8	Vidar	13	5	2	6	21	20	+1	17	
9	Åkra	13	4	5	4	21	23	−2	17	
10	Express	13	5	2	6	26	31	−5	17	
11	Mandalskameratene	13	4	4	5	27	22	+5	16	
12	Hinna (R)	13	3	2	8	15	29	−14	11	Relegation to Fourth Division
13	Madla (R)	13	3	1	9	18	36	−18	10	Relegation to Fourth Division
14	Donn (R)	13	2	1	10	17	41	−24	7	Relegation to Fourth Division

Source: NIFS (in Norwegian)
Rules for classification: 1) Points; 2) Goal difference; 3) Goals scored; 4) Head-to-head points; 5) Head-to-head goal difference; 6) Head-to-head goals scored.
(P) Promoted; (R) Relegated

===== Group 4 =====
Pos	Team	Pld	W	D	L	GF	GA	GD	Pts	Promotion or relegation
1	Frigg (P)	13	11	2	0	48	10	+38	35	Promotion to Second Division
2	Fana	13	11	1	1	43	16	+27	34	
3	Fyllingsdalen	13	9	0	4	34	22	+12	27	
4	Lyn	13	6	5	2	32	20	+12	23	
5	Bjarg	13	7	1	5	25	29	−4	22	
6	Os	13	5	3	5	26	27	−1	18	
7	Ready	13	4	4	5	25	24	+1	16	
8	Brann 2	13	5	0	8	34	30	+4	15	
9	Lysekloster	13	4	3	6	27	23	+4	15	
10	Sandviken	13	4	3	6	25	26	−1	15	
11	Stord	13	4	3	6	30	35	−5	15	
12	Fjøra (R)	13	4	1	8	26	32	−6	13	Relegation to Fourth Division
13	Årdal (R)	13	2	2	9	10	35	−25	8	Relegation to Fourth Division
14	Sogndal 2 (R)	13	0	2	11	7	63	−56	2	Relegation to Fourth Division

Source: NIFS (in Norwegian)
Rules for classification: 1) Points; 2) Goal difference; 3) Goals scored; 4) Head-to-head points; 5) Head-to-head goal difference; 6) Head-to-head goals scored.
(P) Promoted; (R) Relegated

===== Group 5 =====
Pos	Team	Pld	W	D	L	GF	GA	GD	Pts	Promotion or relegation
1	Træff (P)	13	10	1	2	41	20	+21	31	Promotion to Second Division
2	Spjelkavik	13	9	1	3	28	9	+19	28	
3	Strindheim	13	7	5	1	33	17	+16	26	
4	Aalesund 2	13	7	2	4	25	19	+6	23	
5	Kolstad	13	6	3	4	31	20	+11	21	
6	Byåsen	13	5	4	4	23	20	+3	19	
7	Tiller	13	5	3	5	22	21	+1	18	
8	Molde 2	13	5	2	6	24	21	+3	17	
9	Orkla	13	5	2	6	24	34	−10	17	
10	Volda	13	4	4	5	27	21	+6	16	
11	Melhus	13	4	3	6	14	19	−5	15	
12	Ranheim 2 (R)	13	3	3	7	24	50	−26	12	Relegation to Fourth Division
13	NTNUI (R)	13	2	3	8	18	31	−13	9	Relegation to Fourth Division
14	Tynset (R)	13	1	0	12	19	51	−32	3	Relegation to Fourth Division

Source: NIFS (in Norwegian)
Rules for classification: 1) Points; 2) Goal difference; 3) Goals scored; 4) Head-to-head points; 5) Head-to-head goal difference; 6) Head-to-head goals scored.
(P) Promoted; (R) Relegated

===== Group 6 =====
Pos	Team	Pld	W	D	L	GF	GA	GD	Pts	Promotion or relegation
1	Ullern (P)	13	11	2	0	36	9	+27	35	Promotion to Second Division
2	Lokomotiv Oslo	13	7	2	4	28	17	+11	23	
3	Junkeren	13	6	4	3	33	22	+11	22	
4	Tromsø 2	13	6	3	4	24	19	+5	21	
5	Stabæk 2	13	6	3	4	24	22	+2	21	
6	Nordstrand	13	6	2	5	20	20	0	20	
7	Mjølner	13	5	4	4	23	16	+7	19	
8	Rana	13	6	1	6	23	30	−7	19	
9	Bodø/Glimt 2	13	6	0	7	22	28	−6	18	
10	Skjervøy	13	5	2	6	19	21	−2	17	
11	Skeid 2	13	4	4	5	26	25	+1	16	
12	Melbo (R)	13	4	2	7	15	25	−10	14	Relegation to Fourth Division
13	Skånland (R)	13	2	1	10	15	35	−20	7	Relegation to Fourth Division
14	Finnsnes (R)	13	2	0	11	17	36	−19	6	Relegation to Fourth Division

Source: NIFS (in Norwegian)
Rules for classification: 1) Points; 2) Goal difference; 3) Goals scored; 4) Head-to-head points; 5) Head-to-head goal difference; 6) Head-to-head goals scored.
(P) Promoted; (R) Relegated

== Women's football ==
=== League season ===
==== Promotion and relegation ====
League	Promoted to league	Relegated from league
Toppserien	Stabæk	Røa
1. divisjon	none	none

==== Toppserien ====
Pos	Team	Pld	W	D	L	GF	GA	GD	Pts	Qualification or relegation
1	Sandviken (C)	18	17	1	0	50	6	+44	52	Qualification for the Champions League first round
2	Rosenborg	18	16	0	2	42	15	+27	48	Qualification for the Champions League first round
3	LSK Kvinner	18	12	1	5	46	32	+14	37	
4	Vålerenga	18	11	2	5	46	17	+29	35	
5	Arna-Bjørnar	18	6	3	9	27	44	−17	21	
6	Kolbotn	18	6	2	10	21	31	−10	20	
7	Stabæk	18	5	2	11	15	36	−21	17	
8	Avaldsnes	18	3	3	12	25	35	−10	12	
9	Lyn (O)	18	3	3	12	19	34	−15	12	Qualification for the relegation play-offs
10	Klepp (R)	18	2	1	15	12	53	−41	7	Relegation to First Division

Source: Soccerway
Rules for classification: 1) Points; 2) Goal difference; 3) Number of goals scored; 4) Head-to-head points; 5) Head-to-head goal difference; 6) Head-to-head away goals scored
(C) Champions; (O) Play-off winners; (R) Relegated

==== 1. divisjon ====
Pos	Team	Pld	W	D	L	GF	GA	GD	Pts	Promotion, qualification or relegation
1	Røa (C, P)	18	13	5	0	54	6	+48	44	Promotion to Toppserien
2	Åsane	18	11	3	4	33	19	+14	36	Qualification for the promotion play-offs
3	Øvrevoll Hosle	18	10	5	3	39	25	+14	35	
4	Amazon Grimstad	18	10	2	6	24	20	+4	32	
5	Fløya	18	7	3	8	31	27	+4	24	
6	Hønefoss	18	7	2	9	24	35	−11	23	
7	Medkila	18	7	1	10	24	42	−18	22	
8	KIL/Hemne	18	5	2	11	27	32	−5	17	
9	Grei (R)	18	4	2	12	18	33	−15	14	Relegation to Second Division
10	Fart (R)	18	2	3	13	17	52	−35	9	Relegation to Second Division

Source: NIFS (in Norwegian)
Rules for classification: 1) Points; 2) Goal difference; 3) Goals scored; 4) Head-to-head points; 5) Head-to-head goal difference; 6) Head-to-head goals scored.
(C) Champions; (P) Promoted; (R) Relegated

=== Norwegian Women's Cup ===
==== Final ====
31 October 2021
15:00 CEST (UTC+2)

Sandviken	1–2	Vålerenga
Lund 50'	Report	Markussen 13'; Stefanović 45+1'

Ullevaal Stadion, Oslo
Attendance: 3,183
Referee: Karoline Marie Jensen

== UEFA competitions ==
=== UEFA Champions League ===
==== Qualifying phase and play-off round ====
===== First qualifying round =====
Team 1	Agg.	Team 2	1st leg	2nd leg
Bodø/Glimt (Norway)	2–5	(Poland) Legia Warsaw	2–3	0–2

=== UEFA Europa League ===
==== Knockout phase ====
===== Round of 32 =====
The tournament continued from the 2020 season.

Team 1	Agg.	Team 2	1st leg	2nd leg
Molde (Norway)	5–3	(Germany) 1899 Hoffenheim	3–3	2–0

===== Round of 16 =====
Team 1	Agg.	Team 2	1st leg	2nd leg
Granada (Spain)	3–2	(Norway) Molde	2–0	1–2

=== UEFA Europa Conference League ===
==== Second qualifying round ====
Team 1	Agg.	Team 2	1st leg	2nd leg
Valur (Iceland)	0–6	(Norway) Bodø/Glimt	0–3	0–3
Molde (Norway)	3–2	(Switzerland) Servette	3–0	0–2
Gent (Belgium)	4–2	(Norway) Vålerenga	4–0	0–2
FH (Iceland)	1–6	(Norway) Rosenborg	0–2	1–4

==== Third qualifying round ====
Team 1	Agg.	Team 2	1st leg	2nd leg
Prishtina (Kosovo)	2–3	(Norway) Bodø/Glimt	2–1	0–2
Trabzonspor (Turkey)	4–4 (4–3 p)	(Norway) Molde	3–3	1–1 (a.e.t.)
Rosenborg (Norway)	8–2	(Slovenia) Domžale	6–1	2–1

==== Play-off round ====
Team 1	Agg.	Team 2	1st leg	2nd leg
Žalgiris (Lithuania)	2–3	(Norway) Bodø/Glimt	2–2	0–1
Rennes (France)	5–1	(Norway) Rosenborg	2–0	3–1

==== Group stage ====
===== Group C =====
Pos	Team	Pld	W	D	L	GF	GA	GD	Pts	Qualification	ROM	BOD	ZOR	CSS
1	(Italy) Roma	6	4	1	1	18	11	+7	13	Advance to round of 16	—	2–2	4–0	5–1
2	(Norway) Bodø/Glimt	6	3	3	0	14	5	+9	12	Advance to knockout round play-offs	6–1	—	3–1	2–0
3	(Ukraine) Zorya Luhansk	6	2	1	3	5	11	−6	7		0–3	1–1	—	2–0
4	(Bulgaria) CSKA Sofia	6	0	1	5	3	13	−10	1		2–3	0–0	0–1	—

Source: UEFA
Rules for classification: Group stage tiebreakers

=== UEFA Women's Champions League ===
==== 2020–21 ====
===== Knockout phase =====
====== Round of 16 ======
The tournament continued from the 2020 season.

Team 1	Agg.	Team 2	1st leg	2nd leg
VfL Wolfsburg (Germany)	4–0	(Norway) LSK Kvinner	2–0	2–0

==== 2021–22 ====
===== Qualifying rounds =====
====== Round 1 ======
Semi-finals

Team 1	Score	Team 2
Vålerenga (Norway)	5–0	(Kosovo) Mitrovica
FC Minsk (Belarus)	1–2	(Norway) Rosenborg

Finals

Team 1	Score	Team 2
Vålerenga (Norway)	2–0	(Greece) PAOK
Levante (Spain)	4–3 (a.e.t.)	(Norway) Rosenborg

====== Round 2 ======
Team 1	Agg.	Team 2	1st leg	2nd leg
Vålerenga (Norway)	3–6	(Sweden) BK Häcken	1–3	2–3

== National teams ==
=== Norway men's national football team ===
==== 2022 FIFA World Cup qualification ====
===== Group G =====
Pos	Team	Pld	W	D	L	GF	GA	GD	Pts	Qualification	Netherlands	Turkey	Norway	Montenegro	Latvia	Gibraltar
1	Netherlands	10	7	2	1	33	8	+25	23	Qualification for 2022 FIFA World Cup	—	6–1	2–0	4–0	2–0	6–0
2	Turkey	10	6	3	1	27	16	+11	21	Advance to play-offs	4–2	—	1–1	2–2	3–3	6–0
3	Norway	10	5	3	2	15	8	+7	18		1–1	0–3	—	2–0	0–0	5–1
4	Montenegro	10	3	3	4	14	15	−1	12		2–2	1–2	0–1	—	0–0	4–1
5	Latvia	10	2	3	5	11	14	−3	9		0–1	1–2	0–2	1–2	—	3–1
6	Gibraltar	10	0	0	10	4	43	−39	0		0–7	0–3	0–3	0–3	1–3	—

Source: FIFA, UEFA
Rules for classification: Tiebreakers

24 March 2021 2022 FIFA World Cup qualification	Gibraltar	0–3	Norway	Gibraltar
20:45 UTC+1		Report	Sørloth 43'; Thorstvedt 45'; Svensson 57'	Stadium: Victoria Stadium; Referee: Duje Strukan (Croatia)

27 March 2021 2022 FIFA World Cup qualification	Norway	0–3	Turkey	Málaga, Spain
18:00 UTC+1		Report	Tufan 4', 59'; Söyüncü 28'	Stadium: La Rosaleda Stadium; Referee: Alejandro Hernández (Spain)

30 March 2021 2022 FIFA World Cup qualification	Montenegro	0–1	Norway	Podgorica, Montenegro
20:45 UTC+1		Report	Sørloth 35'	Stadium: Podgorica City Stadium; Referee: Anthony Taylor (England)

1 September 2021 2022 FIFA World Cup qualification	Norway	1–1	Netherlands	Oslo, Norway
20:45 UTC+1	Haaland 20'	Report	Klaassen 37'	Stadium: Ullevaal Stadion; Referee: Szymon Marciniak (Poland)

4 September 2021 2022 FIFA World Cup qualification	Latvia	0–2	Norway	Riga, Latvia
18:00 UTC+1		Report	Haaland 20' (pen.); M. Elyounoussi 66'	Stadium: Daugava Stadium; Referee: David Fuxman (Israel)

7 September 2021 2022 FIFA World Cup qualification	Norway	5–1	Gibraltar	Oslo, Norway
20:45 UTC+1	Thorstvedt 23'; Haaland 27', 39', 90+1'; Sørloth 59'	Report	Styche 43'	Stadium: Ullevaal Stadion; Referee: Nikolas Neokleous (Cyprus)

8 October 2021 2022 FIFA World Cup qualification	Turkey	1–1	Norway	Istanbul, Turkey
20:45 UTC+1	Aktürkoğlu 6'	Report	Thorstvedt 41'	Stadium: Şükrü Saracoğlu Stadium; Referee: Felix Brych (Germany)

11 October 2021 2022 FIFA World Cup qualification	Norway	2–0	Montenegro	Oslo, Norway
20:45 UTC+1	Elyounoussi 29', 90+6'	Report		Stadium: Ullevaal Stadion; Referee: István Kovács (Romania)

13 November 2021 2022 FIFA World Cup qualification	Norway	0–0	Latvia	Oslo, Norway
18:00 UTC+1		Report (FIFA); Report (UEFA)		Stadium: Ullevaal Stadion; Referee: Lawrence Visser (Belgium)

16 November 2021 2022 FIFA World Cup qualification	Netherlands	2–0	Norway	Rotterdam, Netherlands
20:45 UTC+1	Bergwijn 84'; Depay 90+1'	Report (FIFA); Report (UEFA)		Stadium: Stadion Feijenoord; Referee: Clément Turpin (France)

==== Friendlies ====
2 June 2021 Friendly	Norway	1–0	Luxembourg	Málaga, Spain
	Haaland 90+2'	Report		Stadium: La Rosaleda Stadium; Referee: Kristoffer Karlsson (Sweden)

6 June 2021 Friendly	Norway	1–2	Greece	Málaga, Spain
19:00	Strandberg 64'	Report	Masouras 13'; Androutsos 21'	Stadium: La Rosaleda Stadium; Referee: Jakob Kehlet (Denmark)

=== Norway women's national football team ===
==== Friendlies ====
8 April 2021 Friendly	Belgium	0–2	Norway	Brussels, Belgium
11:00 UTC+1		Report	Reiten 41'; Utland 73'	Stadium: King Baudouin Stadium; Referee: Victoria Beyer (France)

13 April 2021 Friendly	Germany	3–1	Norway	Wiesbaden, Germany
16:00 UTC+1	Freigang 8'; Dallmann 17'; Krumbiegel 62'	Report	Reiten 4'	Stadium: BRITA-Arena; Referee: Désirée Grundbacher (Switzerland)

10 June 2021 Friendly	Sweden	1–0	Norway	Kalmar, Sweden
18:30 UTC+2	Blackstenius 66'	Report		Stadium: Guldfågeln Arena; Attendance: 500; Referee: Maika Vanderstichel (France)

15 June 2021 Friendly	Netherlands	7–0	Norway	Enschede, Netherlands
11:00 UTC+1	Miedema 13', 57'; Spitse 35'; Roord 51'; Moe Wold (o.g.); Van de Sanden 73'; Van de Donk 84'	Report		Stadium: De Grolsch Veste; Referee: Ainara Acevedo (Spain)

==== 2023 FIFA Women's World Cup qualification ====
===== Group F =====
Pos	Team	Pld	W	D	L	GF	GA	GD	Pts	Qualification	(Norway)	(Belgium)	(Poland)	(Albania)	(Kosovo)	(Armenia)
1	Norway	10	9	1	0	47	2	+45	28	2023 FIFA Women's World Cup	—	4–0	2–1	5–0	5–1	10–0
2	Belgium	10	7	1	2	56	7	+49	22	Play-offs	0–1	—	4–0	7–0	7–0	19–0
3	Poland	10	6	2	2	28	9	+19	20		0–0	1–1	—	2–0	7–0	12–0
4	Albania	10	3	1	6	14	30	−16	10		0–7	0–5	1–2	—	1–1	5–0
5	Kosovo	10	2	1	7	8	35	−27	7		0–3	1–6	1–2	1–3	—	2–1
6	Armenia	10	0	0	10	1	71	−70	0		0–10	0–7	0–1	0–4	0–1	—

Source: UEFA
Rules for classification: Tiebreakers

16 September 2021 2023 Women's World Cup Q	Norway	10–0	Armenia	Oslo, Norway
18:00	Bergsvand 10'; Graham Hansen 28' (pen.), 78', 90+5'; Sævik 38'; Karlseng Utland 47', 79', 87'; Blakstad 62'; Terland 90'	Report	Sakhinova (yellow card) 27'; Osipyan (yellow card) 49'	Stadium: Ullevaal Stadion; Referee: Rasa Grigonė (Lithuania)

21 September 2021 2023 Women's World Cup Q	Kosovo	0–3	Norway	Pristina, Kosovo
19:00		Report	Avduli 12' (o.g.); Blakstad 36'; Karlseng Utland 56'	Stadium: Fadil Vokrri Stadium; Referee: Reelika Turi (Estonia)

21 October 2021 2023 Women's World Cup Q	Poland	0–0	Norway	Łódź
		Report		Stadium: Stadion Miejski Widzewa; Referee: Jana Adámková (Czech Republic)

26 October 2021 2023 Women's World Cup Q	Norway	4–0	Belgium	Oslo
	Bergsvand 6'; Graham Hansen 30'; Terland 68'; Syrstad Engen 90+1'	Report		Stadium: Ullevaal Stadion; Referee: Rebecca Welch (England)

25 November 2021 2023 Women's World Cup Q	Albania	0–7	Norway	Rrogozhinë
		Report	Maanum 23', 77'; Reiten 60'; Thorisdottir 62'; Sævik 72'; Hasund 81'; Terland 84'	Stadium: Rrogozhinë Stadium; Referee: Miriama Matulova (Slovakia)

30 November 2021 (Note: Suspended in the 71st minute at 0–9 due to adverse weather. The match resumed on 1 December.) 2023 Women's World Cup Q	Armenia	0–10	Norway	Yerevan
		Report	Terland 31', 34'; Karlseng Utland 43', 56'; Maanum 47'; Reiten 51'; Sønstevold 59'; Bergsvand 63'; Ildhusøy 69'; Syrstad Engen 81' (pen.)	Stadium: Yerevan Football Academy Stadium; Referee: Victoria Beyer (France)
