= 2020 in Norwegian football =

Football in Norway
- Season: 2020

Men's football
- Eliteserien: Bodø/Glimt
- 1. divisjon: Tromsø
- 2. divisjon: Fredrikstad (Group 1); Bryne (Group 2)

Women's football
- Toppserien: Vålerenga
- 1. divisjon: Stabæk
- Cupen: Vålerenga

The 2020 season was the 115th season of competitive football in Norway.

The season was originally scheduled to start on 4 April, but due to the COVID-19 pandemic in Norway the football season was delayed. On 7 May 2020, the Norwegian government allowed the league to start on 16 June 2020.

The men's 3. divisjon and women's 2. divisjon, along with all other lower divisions, were cancelled due to the COVID-19 pandemic. The men's football cup was also cancelled.

== Men's football ==
=== League season ===
==== Promotion and relegation ====
League	Promoted to league	Relegated from league
Eliteserien	Aalesund; Sandefjord; Start	Lillestrøm; Tromsø; Ranheim
1. divisjon	Stjørdals-Blink; Grorud; Åsane	Notodden; Skeid; Tromsdalen
2. divisjon	Eidsvold Turn; Vålerenga 2; Fløy; Vard Haugesund; Rosenborg 2; Fløya	Vidar; Sola; Byåsen; Elverum; Oppsal; Mjølner

==== Eliteserien ====
Pos	Team	Pld	W	D	L	GF	GA	GD	Pts	Qualification or relegation
1	Bodø/Glimt (C)	30	26	3	1	103	32	+71	81	Qualification for the Champions League first qualifying round
2	Molde	30	20	2	8	77	36	+41	62	Qualification for the Europa Conference League second qualifying round
3	Vålerenga	30	15	10	5	51	33	+18	55	Qualification for the Europa Conference League second qualifying round
4	Rosenborg	30	15	7	8	50	35	+15	52	Qualification for the Europa Conference League second qualifying round
5	Kristiansund	30	12	12	6	57	45	+12	48	
6	Viking	30	12	8	10	54	52	+2	44	
7	Odd	30	13	4	13	52	51	+1	43	
8	Stabæk	30	9	12	9	41	45	−4	39	
9	Haugesund	30	11	6	13	39	51	−12	39	
10	Brann	30	9	9	12	40	49	−9	36	
11	Sandefjord	30	9	8	13	31	43	−12	35	
12	Sarpsborg 08	30	8	8	14	33	43	−10	32	
13	Strømsgodset	30	7	10	13	41	57	−16	31	
14	Mjøndalen (O)	30	8	3	19	26	45	−19	27	Qualification for the relegation play-offs
15	Start (R)	30	6	9	15	33	56	−23	27	Relegation to First Division
16	Aalesund (R)	30	2	5	23	30	85	−55	11	Relegation to First Division

Source: Football Association of Norway (in Norwegian)
Rules for classification: 1) Points; 2) Goal difference; 3) Goals scored; 4) Head-to-head points; 5) Head-to-head goal difference; 6) Head-to-head away goals scored (only if between two teams); 7) Head-to-head goals scored; 8) Play-off (only used to decide champions or relegation).
(C) Champions; (O) Play-off winners; (R) Relegated

==== 1. divisjon ====
Pos	Team	Pld	W	D	L	GF	GA	GD	Pts	Promotion, qualification or relegation
1	Tromsø (C, P)	30	19	6	5	60	29	+31	63	Promotion to Eliteserien
2	Lillestrøm (P)	30	16	9	5	49	26	+23	57	Promotion to Eliteserien
3	Sogndal	30	15	6	9	57	36	+21	51	Qualification for the promotion play-offs
4	Ranheim	30	13	8	9	61	41	+20	47	Qualification for the promotion play-offs
5	Åsane	30	12	9	9	60	48	+12	45	Qualification for the promotion play-offs
6	Raufoss	30	11	10	9	53	44	+9	42 (Note: Raufoss have been deducted 1 point.)	Qualification for the promotion play-offs
7	Sandnes Ulf	30	11	8	11	46	55	−9	41	
8	KFUM Oslo	30	10	9	11	44	44	0	39	
9	HamKam	30	10	9	11	49	52	−3	39	
10	Strømmen	30	10	8	12	47	51	−4	35 (Note: Strømmen have been deducted 3 points.)	
11	Jerv	30	9	8	13	41	57	−16	35	
12	Ull/Kisa	30	10	5	15	45	63	−18	35	
13	Grorud	30	9	7	14	45	56	−11	34	
14	Stjørdals-Blink (O)	30	8	9	13	52	59	−7	33	Qualification for the relegation play-offs
15	Kongsvinger (R)	30	6	10	14	35	53	−18	28	Relegation to Second Division
16	Øygarden (R)	30	6	9	15	37	67	−30	27	Relegation to Second Division

Source: NFF, Soccerway
Rules for classification: 1) Points; 2) Goal difference; 3) Goals scored; 4) Head-to-head points; 5) Head-to-head goal difference; 6) Head-to-head away goals scored (only if between two teams); 7) Head-to-head goals scored; 8) Play-off (only used to decide champions or relegation).
(C) Champions; (O) Play-off winners; (P) Promoted; (R) Relegated

==== 2. divisjon ====
===== Group 1 =====
Pos	Team	Pld	W	D	L	GF	GA	GD	Pts	Promotion, qualification or relegation
1	Fredrikstad	13	13	0	0	45	12	+33	39	Qualification for promotion group 1
2	Hødd	13	8	2	3	21	7	+14	26	Qualification for promotion group 1
3	Skeid	13	8	1	4	29	17	+12	25	Qualification for promotion group 1
4	Kvik Halden	13	8	1	4	29	20	+9	25	Qualification for promotion group 1
5	Alta	13	8	1	4	25	17	+8	25	Qualification for promotion group 1
6	Brattvåg	13	5	4	4	26	17	+9	19	Qualification for promotion group 1
7	Tromsdalen	13	5	3	5	26	17	+9	18	Qualification for promotion group 1
8	Vålerenga 2	13	5	2	6	14	29	−15	17	
9	Eidsvold Turn	13	5	1	7	25	33	−8	16	
10	Florø	13	4	2	7	26	25	+1	14	
11	Kjelsås	13	3	5	5	21	21	0	14	
12	Moss	13	3	2	8	16	24	−8	11	
13	Senja	13	2	3	8	13	33	−20	8 (Note: Senja have been deducted 1 point.)	
14	Fløya	13	0	1	12	10	54	−44	1	

Source: fotball.no (in Norwegian)
Rules for classification: 1) Points; 2) Goal difference; 3) Goals scored; 4) Head-to-head points; 5) Head-to-head goal difference; 6) Head-to-head away goals scored (only if between two teams); 7) Head-to-head goals scored; 8) Play-off (only used to decide champions or relegation).

====== Promotion group 1 ======
Pos	Team	Pld	W	D	L	GF	GA	GD	Pts	Promotion, qualification or relegation
1	Fredrikstad (C, P)	19	17	1	1	60	19	+41	52	Promotion to First Division
2	Skeid	19	12	2	5	36	21	+15	38	Qualification for the promotion play-offs
3	Hødd	17	9	3	5	28	14	+14	30	
4	Alta	17	9	2	6	33	26	+7	29	
5	Kvik Halden	17	9	2	6	37	31	+6	29	
6	Brattvåg	18	6	6	6	32	28	+4	24	
7	Tromsdalen	18	6	4	8	31	24	+7	22	

Source: nifs.no (in Norwegian)
Rules for classification: 1) Points; 2) Goal difference; 3) Goals scored; 4) Head-to-head points; 5) Head-to-head goal difference; 6) Head-to-head away goals scored (only if between two teams); 7) Head-to-head goals scored; 8) Play-off (only used to decide champions or relegation).
(C) Champions; (P) Promoted

===== Group 2 =====
Pos	Team	Pld	W	D	L	GF	GA	GD	Pts	Promotion, qualification or relegation
1	Bryne	13	9	3	1	33	16	+17	30	Qualification for promotion group 2
2	Vard Haugesund	13	9	1	3	29	10	+19	28	Qualification for promotion group 2
3	Egersund	13	7	2	4	34	15	+19	23	Qualification for promotion group 2
4	Asker	13	6	5	2	21	15	+6	23	Qualification for promotion group 2
5	Arendal	13	6	3	4	22	10	+12	21	Qualification for promotion group 2
6	Fløy-Flekkerøy	13	6	3	4	18	13	+5	21	Qualification for promotion group 2
7	Sotra	13	6	2	5	17	18	−1	20	Qualification for promotion group 2
8	Levanger	13	5	4	4	20	18	+2	17 (Note: Levanger have been deducted 2 points.)	
9	Notodden	13	5	1	7	16	24	−8	16	
10	Nardo	13	2	6	5	12	20	−8	12	
11	Bærum	13	1	8	4	13	18	−5	11	
12	Rosenborg 2	13	3	2	8	12	24	−12	11	
13	Odd 2	13	2	3	8	9	31	−22	9	
14	Fram Larvik	13	1	3	9	17	41	−24	6	

Source: fotball.no (in Norwegian)
Rules for classification: 1) Points; 2) Goal difference; 3) Goals scored; 4) Head-to-head points; 5) Head-to-head goal difference; 6) Head-to-head away goals scored (only if between two teams); 7) Head-to-head goals scored; 8) Play-off (only used to decide champions or relegation).

====== Promotion group 2 ======
Pos	Team	Pld	W	D	L	GF	GA	GD	Pts	Promotion, qualification or relegation
1	Bryne (C, P)	19	13	5	1	47	23	+24	44	Promotion to First Division
2	Asker	19	10	7	2	38	21	+17	37	Qualification for the promotion play-offs
3	Egersund	19	10	4	5	48	22	+26	34	
4	Vard Haugesund	19	11	1	7	34	19	+15	34	
5	Arendal	19	9	5	5	32	18	+14	32	
6	Fløy-Flekkerøy	18	6	3	9	21	27	−6	21	
7	Sotra	18	6	2	10	21	34	−13	20	

Source: nifs.no (in Norwegian)
Rules for classification: 1) Points; 2) Goal difference; 3) Goals scored; 4) Head-to-head points; 5) Head-to-head goal difference; 6) Head-to-head away goals scored (only if between two teams); 7) Head-to-head goals scored; 8) Play-off (only used to decide champions or relegation).
(C) Champions; (P) Promoted

== Women's football ==
=== League season ===
==== Promotion and relegation ====
League	Promoted to league	Relegated from league
Toppserien	none	Stabæk; Fart
1. divisjon	Frigg; KIL/Hemne	Grand Bodø; Byåsen; Kaupanger; Nanset; Snøgg

==== Toppserien ====
Pos	Team	Pld	W	D	L	GF	GA	GD	Pts	Qualification or relegation
1	Vålerenga (C)	18	11	5	2	39	14	+25	38	Qualification for the Champions League first round
2	Rosenborg	18	10	8	0	34	16	+18	38	Qualification for the Champions League first round
3	Avaldsnes	18	10	4	4	31	21	+10	34	
4	Sandviken	18	9	3	6	29	23	+6	30	
5	LSK Kvinner	18	9	2	7	29	23	+6	29	
6	Lyn	18	6	3	9	24	30	−6	21	
7	Klepp	18	5	3	10	19	33	−14	18	
8	Arna-Bjørnar	18	5	2	11	13	29	−16	17	
9	Kolbotn (O)	18	2	7	9	18	29	−11	13	Qualification for the relegation play-offs
10	Røa (R)	18	3	3	12	15	33	−18	12	Relegation to First Division

Source: Norges Fotballforbund (in Norwegian)
Rules for classification: 1) Points; 2) Goal difference; 3) Number of goals scored; 4) Head-to-head points; 5) Head-to-head goal difference; 6) Head-to-head away goals scored
(C) Champions; (O) Play-off winners; (R) Relegated

==== 1. divisjon ====
Pos	Team	Pld	W	D	L	GF	GA	GD	Pts	Promotion, qualification or relegation
1	Stabæk (C, P)	18	17	0	1	68	13	+55	51	Promotion to Toppserien
2	Medkila	18	12	0	6	33	21	+12	36	Qualification for the promotion play-offs
3	Øvrevoll Hosle	18	11	2	5	39	21	+18	35	
4	Hønefoss	18	11	1	6	44	33	+11	34	
5	Åsane	18	10	2	6	43	23	+20	32	
6	KIL/Hemne	18	5	6	7	30	36	−6	21	
7	Amazon Grimstad	18	6	2	10	25	38	−13	20	
8	Grei	18	4	6	8	20	32	−12	18	
9	Fløya	18	1	3	14	19	55	−36	6	
10	Fart	18	1	2	15	13	62	−49	5	

Source: Norges Fotballforbund (in Norwegian)
Rules for classification: 1) Points; 2) Goal difference; 3) Goals scored; 4) Head-to-head points; 5) Head-to-head goal difference; 6) Head-to-head away goals scored (only if between two teams); 7) Head-to-head goals scored; 8) Play-off (only used to decide champions or relegation).
(C) Champions; (P) Promoted

=== Norwegian Women's Cup ===
==== Final ====
13 December 2020
15:30 CET

LSK Kvinner	0–2 (a.e.t.)	Vålerenga
	Report	Njoya 102'; Markussen 105'

Ullevaal Stadion, Oslo
Attendance: 200
Referee: Henrikke Holm Nervik (Trygg/Lade)

== UEFA competitions ==
=== UEFA Champions League ===
==== Qualifying phase and play-off round ====
===== First qualifying round =====
Team 1	Score	Team 2
Molde (Norway)	5–0	(Finland) KuPS

===== Second qualifying round =====
Team 1	Score	Team 2
Celje (Slovenia)	1–2	(Norway) Molde

===== Third qualifying round =====
Team 1	Score	Team 2
Qarabağ (Azerbaijan)	0–0 (a.e.t.) (5–6 p)	(Norway) Molde

===== Play-off round =====
Team 1	Agg.	Team 2	1st leg	2nd leg
Molde (Norway)	3–3 (a)	(Hungary) Ferencváros	3–3	0–0

=== UEFA Europa League ===
==== Qualifying phase and play-off round ====
===== First qualifying round =====
Team 1	Score	Team 2
Rosenborg (Norway)	4–2	(Iceland) Breiðablik
Bodø/Glimt (Norway)	6–1	(Lithuania) Kauno Žalgiris

===== Second qualifying round =====
Team 1	Score	Team 2
Viking (Norway)	0–2	(Scotland) Aberdeen
Ventspils (Latvia)	1–5	(Norway) Rosenborg
Bodø/Glimt (Norway)	3–1	(Lithuania) Žalgiris

===== Third qualifying round =====
Team 1	Score	Team 2
Rosenborg (Norway)	1–0	(Turkey) Alanyaspor
Milan (Italy)	3–2	(Norway) Bodø/Glimt

===== Play-off round =====
Team 1	Score	Team 2
Rosenborg (Norway)	0–2	(Netherlands) PSV Eindhoven

==== Group stage ====
===== Group B =====
Pos	Team	Pld	W	D	L	GF	GA	GD	Pts	Qualification	ARS	MOL	RW	DUN
1	(England) Arsenal	6	6	0	0	20	5	+15	18	Advance to knockout phase	—	4–1	4–1	3–0
2	(Norway) Molde	6	3	1	2	9	11	−2	10	Advance to knockout phase	0–3	—	1–0	3–1
3	(Austria) Rapid Wien	6	2	1	3	11	13	−2	7		1–2	2–2	—	4–3
4	(Republic of Ireland) Dundalk	6	0	0	6	8	19	−11	0		2–4	1–2	1–3	—

Source: UEFA

The tournament continued into the 2021 season.

=== UEFA Women's Champions League ===
==== Qualifying rounds ====
===== First qualifying round =====
Team 1	Score	Team 2
Vålerenga (Norway)	7–0	(Faroe Islands) KÍ

===== Second qualifying round =====
Team 1	Score	Team 2
Gintra Universitetas (Lithuania)	0–7	(Norway) Vålerenga

==== Knockout phase ====
===== Round of 32 =====
Team 1	Agg.	Team 2	1st leg	2nd leg
FC Minsk (Belarus)	1–2	(Norway) LSK Kvinner	0–2	1–0
Vålerenga (Norway)	1–1 (4–5 p)	(Denmark) Brøndby	—	1–1 (a.e.t.)

The tournament continued into the 2021 season.

== National teams ==
=== Norway men's national football team ===
==== UEFA Euro 2020 qualifying ====
===== Play-offs path C =====
8 October 2020 UEFA Euro 2020 qualifying play-offs	Norway	1–2 (a.e.t.)	Serbia	Oslo, Norway
18:00	Normann 88'	Report	Milinković-Savić 82', 102'	Stadium: Ullevaal Stadion; Referee: Daniele Orsato (Italy)

==== 2020–21 UEFA Nations League B ====
===== Group 1 =====
Pos	Team	Pld	W	D	L	GF	GA	GD	Pts	Promotion or relegation	(Austria)	(Norway)	(Romania)	(Northern Ireland)
1	Austria (P)	6	4	1	1	9	6	+3	13	Promotion to League A	—	1–1	2–3	2–1
2	Norway	6	3	1	2	12	7	+5	10		1–2	—	4–0	1–0
3	Romania	6	2	2	2	8	9	−1	8		0–1	3–0 (Note: The Romania v Norway match was awarded as a 3–0 win to Romania after being cancelled as Norway could not travel to the match due to a positive SARS-CoV-2 test in the team.)	—	1–1
4	Northern Ireland (R)	6	0	2	4	4	11	−7	2	Relegation to League C	0–1	1–5	1–1	—

Source: UEFA
Rules for classification: Tiebreakers
(P) Promoted; (R) Relegated
Notes:

4 September 2020 2020–21 UEFA Nations League B	Norway	1–2	Austria	Oslo, Norway
20:45	Haaland 66'	Report	Gregoritsch 35'; Sabitzer 54' (pen.)	Stadium: Ullevaal Stadion; Attendance: NIL; Referee: Mattias Gestranius (Finland)

7 September 2020 2020–21 UEFA Nations League B	Northern Ireland	1–5	Norway	Belfast, Northern Ireland
20:45 (19:45 UTC+1)	McNair 6'	Report	Elyounoussi 2'; Haaland 7', 58'; Sørloth 19', 47'	Stadium: Windsor Park; Attendance: NIL; Referee: Bartosz Frankowski (Poland)

11 October 2020 2020–21 UEFA Nations League B	Norway	4–0	Romania	Oslo, Norway
18:00	Haaland 13', 64', 74'; Sørloth 39'	Report		Stadium: Ullevaal Stadion; Referee: Ivan Kružliak (Slovakia)

14 October 2020 2020–21 UEFA Nations League B	Norway	1–0	Northern Ireland	Oslo, Norway
20:45	Dallas 68' (o.g.)	Report		Stadium: Ullevaal Stadion; Referee: Kristo Tohver (Estonia)

15 November 2020 2020–21 UEFA Nations League B	Romania	3–0; Awarded (Note: The Romania v Norway match was cancelled and awarded as a 3–0 win to Romania after the Norway national team were prohibited from travelling to Romania by the Norwegian government due to a positive SARS-CoV-2 test in the squad.)	Norway	Bucharest, Romania
20:45 (21:45 UTC+2)		Report		Stadium: Arena Națională; Referee: Ali Palabıyık (Turkey)

18 November 2020 2020–21 UEFA Nations League B	Austria	1–1	Norway	Vienna, Austria
20:45	Grbić 90+4'	Report	Zahid 61'	Stadium: Ernst-Happel-Stadion; Referee: Benoît Bastien (France)

=== Norway women's national football team ===
==== UEFA Women's Euro 2021 qualifying ====
===== Group C =====
Pos	Team	Pld	W	D	L	GF	GA	GD	Pts	Qualification	Norway		Wales	Belarus	Faroe Islands
1	Norway	6	6	0	0	34	1	+33	18	Final tournament	—	6–0	1–0	Canc.	Canc.
2	Northern Ireland	8	4	2	2	17	17	0	14 (Note: Ranked on head-to-head away goals: Northern Ireland 2; Wales 0.)	Play-offs	0–6	—	0–0	3–2	5–1
3	Wales	8	4	2	2	16	4	+12	14		0–1	2–2	—	3–0	4–0
4	Belarus	7	2	0	5	11	15	−4	6		1–7	0–1	0–1	—	6–0
5	Faroe Islands	7	0	0	7	1	42	−41	0		0–13	0–6	0–6	0–2	—

Source: UEFA
Notes:

22 September 2020 UEFA Women's Euro 2021 qualifying	Norway	1–0	Wales	Oslo
18:00	Reiten 29'; Wold (yellow card) 65'; Minde (yellow card) 71'	Report	James (yellow card) 75'; K. Green (yellow card) 81'	Stadium: Ullevaal Stadion; Referee: Petra Pavlikova (Slovakia)

27 October 2020 UEFA Women's Euro 2021 qualifying	Wales	0–1	Norway	Newport, Wales
19:00		Report	Maanum 61'	Stadium: Rodney Parade; Referee: Marta Frías Acedo (Spain)

26 November 2020 UEFA Women's Euro 2021 qualifying	Norway	Cancelled	Faroe Islands	Drammen
20:00		Cancellation		Stadium: Marienlyst Stadion
