= Emilie Woldvik =

Norwegian footballer (born 1999)

Personal information
- Full name: Emilie Marie Aanes Woldvik
- Date of birth: 8 January 1999 (age 27)
- Place of birth: Norway
- Position: Full-back

Team information
- Current team: Fiorentina
- Number: 2

Youth career
- 2012–2014: Kløfta
- 2015–2019: LSK Kvinner

Senior career*
| Years | Team | Apps | (Gls) |
| 2017–2024 | LSK Kvinner | 150 | (13) |
| 2025 | FC Rosengård | 12 | (3) |
| 2025– | Fiorentina | 8 | (1) |

International career^{‡}
| 2014 | Norway U15 | 4 | (0) |
| 2015 | Norway U16 | 2 | (0) |
| 2016 | Norway U17 | 4 | (0) |
| 2018 | Norway U19 | 5 | (0) |
| 2019–2024 | Norway U23 | 22 | (1) |
| 2020– | Norway | 19 | (0) |
- * Club domestic league appearances and goals as of 02:27, 15 December 2025 (UTC) ‡ National team caps and goals as of 9 June 2026

Emilie Marie Aanes Woldvik (born 8 January 1999) is a Norwegian footballer who plays as a defender for Italian Serie A club ACF Fiorentina and the Norway national team. She started her career with LSK Kvinner, coming up through the academy before winning three Toppserien titles and captaining the team.

== Club career ==
=== LSK Kvinner ===
After three seasons in the youth system of Kløfta, Woldvik joined LSK Kvinner in 2015. She won multiple youth tournaments while in the different age categories including the under-18 Gothia Cup in 2015, under-19 Norway Cup in 2019 and the 2. divisjon avdeling 1 league title with LSK 2 in 2016.

Ahead of the 2017 season, Woldvik was promoted to the first-team. She made her senior debut on 17 April 2017 as a 74th-minute substitute in a 7–1 Toppserien victory over Klepp. She scored her first goal for the club on 9 September 2017 in a 6–1 league victory over Røa. In her first season, Woldvik made eight league appearances including two starts as LSK won the Toppserien title for the fourth consecutive season. The following season she made eight starts in 15 appearances as LSK successfully defended their Toppserien title again. She also started in the 2018 Norwegian Cup final at right-back in the absence of the injured Ingrid Moe Wold as LSK beat Sandviken 4–0, registering an assist on Guro Reiten's second goal. She also made her UEFA Women's Champions League debut on 27 September 2018, as a 71st-minute substitute in a Round of 32 second leg victory over Russian side Zvezda-2005 Perm.

Woldvik cemented her place as a starter during the 2019 season as LSK did the double for the second consecutive season, starting in 17 of 19 appearances. On 20 October 2019, she scored an 87th-minute equaliser in a 2–2 draw with Kolbotn, her only goal of the season. The result clinched the Toppserien title with two games to spare. At the end of the year Woldvik was named in the 2019 Toppserien team of the season. The award synopsis notably mentioned her 77% tackle success rate and the fact she led all left-backs in passes in the opposition half. She retained her place in the team of the season in 2020. This time she was noted for her set piece ability and link-up with Emilie Haavi to form "the Toppserien's best offensive left side." Despite a strong season personally, LSK's six-year reign at the top of the table was ended as the team finished in 5th-place and also lost in the Norwegian Cup final to league champions Vålerenga, losing 2–0 in extra-time.

Ahead of the 2022 season, Woldvik was named captain of LSK following the departure of Emilie Haavi to AS Roma in the offseason.

After the conclusion of the 2024 season, on 18 December, it was announced Woldvik was departing LSK Kvinner after 10 years following the expiration of her contract.

=== Rosengård ===
On 11 January 2025, Woldvik joined reigning Swedish Damallsvenskan champions FC Rosengård on a two-year contract. She spent six months with Rosengård, scoring three goals in twelve starts for the club.

=== Fiorentina ===
In August 2025, Woldvik was announced at Italian club ACF Fiorentina.

== International career ==
Woldvik has represented Norway at multiple youth levels, starting in 2014 with the under-15s. In 2018 she was a member of the squad that competed at the 2018 Under-19 European Championship. She made three appearances as Norway topped the group before being eliminated by Germany 2–0 in the semi-finals.

In February 2020, Woldvik received her first senior national team call-up for the 2020 Algarve Cup, the only debutant in the squad. On 7 March 2020, she made her senior international debut as a 74th-minute substitute for Ingrid Moe Wold in a 4–0 semi-final defeat to Germany.

On 16 June 2025, Woldvik was called up to the Norway squad for the UEFA Women's Euro 2025.

== Career statistics ==
=== Club ===
As of match played 16 November 2024.

Appearances and goals by club, season and competition
| Club | Season | League | | | National Cup (Note: Includes NM Kvinner) | | Continental (Note: Includes Champions League) | | Playoffs | | Total | |
| Club | Season | Division | Apps | Goals | Apps | Goals | Apps | Goals | Apps | Goals | Apps | Goals |
|---|---|---|---|---|---|---|---|---|---|---|---|---|
| LSK Kvinner | 2017 | Toppserien | 8 | 1 | 2 | 0 | 0 | 0 | — | | 10 | 1 |
| LSK Kvinner | 2018 | Toppserien | 15 | 0 | 4 | 0 | 2 | 0 | — | | 21 | 0 |
| LSK Kvinner | 2019 | Toppserien | 19 | 1 | 5 | 0 | 3 | 0 | — | | 27 | 1 |
| LSK Kvinner | 2020 | Toppserien | 18 | 1 | 4 | 1 | 2 | 0 | — | | 24 | 2 |
| LSK Kvinner | 2021 | Toppserien | 18 | 1 | 4 | 2 | 2 | 0 | — | | 24 | 3 |
| LSK Kvinner | 2022 | Toppserien | 18 | 1 | 3 | 0 | — | | 3 | 0 | 24 | 1 |
| LSK Kvinner | 2023 | Toppserien | 27 | 4 | 3 | 1 | — | | — | | 30 | 5 |
| LSK Kvinner | 2024 | Toppserien | 27 | 4 | 2 | 0 | — | | — | | 29 | 4 |
| LSK Kvinner | Total | | 150 | 13 | 27 | 4 | 9 | 0 | 3 | 0 | 189 | 17 |
| FC Rosengård | 2025 | Damallsvenskan | 0 | 0 | 0 | 0 | 0 | 0 | — | | 0 | 0 |
| Career total | | | 150 | 13 | 27 | 4 | 9 | 0 | 3 | 0 | 189 | 17 |

=== International ===
Statistics accurate as of match played 10 July 2025.

Norway
| Year | Apps | Goals |
|---|---|---|
| 2020 | 1 | 0 |
| 2021 | 2 | 0 |
| 2024 | 5 | 0 |
| 2025 | 7 | 0 |
| Total | 15 | 0 |

== Honours ==
=== Club ===
LSK Kvinner

- Toppserien: 2017, 2018, 2019
- Norwegian Women's Cup: 2018, 2019

=== Individual ===
- Toppserien Team of the Season: 2019, 2020 2024
