= Cornelia Fladberg =

Norwegian footballer (born 2001)

Personal information
- Full name: Cornelia Remme Fladberg
- Date of birth: 8 February 2001 (age 25)
- Position: Midfielder

Team information
- Current team: Lyn
- Number: 8

Youth career
- Mysen
- –2016: Askim
- 2017: Stabæk

Senior career*
Years	Team	Apps	(Gls)
2018–2021	Stabæk	55	(2)
2022–	Lyn	88	(3)

International career
2016	Norway U15	3	(1)
2017	Norway U16	8	(0)
2018	Norway U17	5	(1)
2019	Norway U19	5	(0)
- * Club domestic league appearances and goals as of 18 May 2015

Cornelia Fladberg (born 8 February 2001) is a Norwegian footballer who plays as a midfielder for Lyn.

== Career ==
She was born in Fredrikstad, but comes from Mysen and started her career in Mysen IL before moving on to Askim FK. She also represented Norway internationally from the U15 category.

After the 2016 season, she moved to top-flight team Stabæk. She made her Toppserien debut in May 2018. After the 2021 season she continued her career in Lyn.

Fladberg was injured in early and mid-2020, having had little systematic strength training in the teenage years.
