= 2020 Norwegian First Division (women) =

1. divisjon
- Season: 2020
- Dates: 11 July 2020 – 22 November 2020
- Champions: Stabæk
- Promoted: Stabæk
- Matches: 90
- Goals: 334 (3.71 per match)
- Top goalscorer: Melissa Bjånesøy (25 goals)
- Biggest home win: Stabæk 9–1 Amazon Grimstad (15 November 2020)
- Biggest away win: Fløya 0–6 Åsane (17 October 2020) Hønefoss 0–6 Øvrevoll Hosle (10 October 2020)
- Highest scoring: Stabæk 9–1 Amazon Grimstad (15 November 2020)
- All statistics correct as of 22 November 2020.

The 2020 1. divisjon was the 36th season of the 1. divisjon, the second-tier Norwegian women's football division, and the 19th season under the current format. The season started on 11 July 2020 and ended on 22 November 2020

Stabæk won the league and were thus promoted to the Toppserien.

Due to the COVID-19 pandemic, the season's starting date was delayed and the format changed, there will be no play-offs this season. Starting from 2021 the league will assume a new format.

== Format ==
The teams were reduced from 12 teams to 10 as four teams relegated from the previous season, Grand Bodø were relegated after losing to KIL/Hemne at the relegation play-offs. In addition, Stabæk and Fart were relegated from the 2019 Toppserien. The winner will be promoted to the 2021 Toppserien automatically while the second placed team will enter a play-off with the 2020 Toppserien best relegating team, there would be no relegation this season.

== League table ==
Pos	Team	Pld	W	D	L	GF	GA	GD	Pts	Promotion, qualification or relegation
1	Stabæk (C, P)	18	17	0	1	68	13	+55	51	Promotion to Toppserien
2	Medkila	18	12	0	6	33	21	+12	36	Qualification for the promotion play-offs
3	Øvrevoll Hosle	18	11	2	5	39	21	+18	35	
4	Hønefoss	18	11	1	6	44	33	+11	34	
5	Åsane	18	10	2	6	43	23	+20	32	
6	KIL/Hemne	18	5	6	7	30	36	−6	21	
7	Amazon Grimstad	18	6	2	10	25	38	−13	20	
8	Grei	18	4	6	8	20	32	−12	18	
9	Fløya	18	1	3	14	19	55	−36	6	
10	Fart	18	1	2	15	13	62	−49	5	

Source: Norges Fotballforbund (in Norwegian)
Rules for classification: 1) Points; 2) Goal difference; 3) Goals scored; 4) Head-to-head points; 5) Head-to-head goal difference; 6) Head-to-head away goals scored (only if between two teams); 7) Head-to-head goals scored; 8) Play-off (only used to decide champions or relegation).
(C) Champions; (P) Promoted

== Results ==
Home \ Away	ÅSA	AMG	FAR	FLØ	GRE	HØN	KIL	MED	ØVR	STA
Åsane	—	0–1	4–0	4–1	1–1	4–1	3–0	0–1	1–0	2–3
Amazon Grimstad	3–1	—	2–0	4–3	3–0	1–2	0–3	0–1	0–2	0–1
Fart	0–3	2–4	—	0–4	0–2	1–4	1–3	1–3	0–3	1–6
Fløya	0–6	1–1	3–3	—	0–1	1–4	2–2	0–1	1–4	0–3
Grei	1–2	4–2	2–2	1–0	—	1–3	1–1	1–2	0–1	0–3
Hønefoss	4–2	3–1	7–0	5–2	1–1	—	1–0	2–1	0–6	0–2
KIL/Hemne	2–2	1–1	5–0	3–0	2–2	2–1	—	1–2	0–2	1–2
Medkila	2–1	4–1	0–1	4–1	2–1	1–2	6–1	—	2–1	0–4
Øvrevoll Hosle	1–3	1–0	2–1	5–0	1–1	4–3	3–3	1–0	—	1–2
Stabæk	2–4	9–1	5–0	4–0	6–0	3–1	7–0	2–1	4–1	—

Source: Norges Fotballforbund (in Norwegian)
Legend: Blue = home team win; Yellow = draw; Red = away team win.

== Promotion play-offs ==
The league's runners-up, Medkila, faced Kolbotn, the 9th placed team in the 2020 Toppserien, in a two-legged play-off to decide who will play in the 2021 Toppserien.

=== 1st leg ===
22 November 2020
13:00

Kolbotn	5–0	Medkila
Skau 2' (o.g.); Holmen 17', 43'; Fridlund 38'; Klæboe 52'	Report

Strømmen Stadion, Strømmen
Referee: Fatemeh Zangeneh

=== 2nd leg ===
25 November 2020
19:00

Medkila	2–1	Kolbotn
Mjåset 1'; Brustad 54'	Report	Sørsdahl 74'

Harstad stadion, Harstad
Referee: Ingvild Langnes Aarland

Kolbotn won 6–2 on aggregate.

== Statistics ==
=== Top scorers ===
Rank	Player	Club	Goals
1	(Norway) Melissa Bjånesøy	Stabæk	25
2	(Norway) Silje Bekkåsen Nyhagen	Hønefoss	18
3	(Norway) Zara Jönsson	Stabæk	14
4	(Norway) Cathrine Dyngvold	Amazon Grimstad	11
4	(Poland) Milena Kokosz	Åsane	11
4	(Norway) Anna Østrem	Åsane	11
7	(Norway) Joshualyn Favour Reeves	Øvrevoll Hosle	10
8	(Norway) Agnethe Olaug Mathisen	Medkila IL	9
9	(Norway) Maiken Elise Bjørndalen	Stabæk	8
10	4 players		7
