= Gullballen =

Norwegian football award

- Awarded for: Association football award
- Country: Norway
- Presented by: Norwegian Football Federation

History
- First award: 2014
- Most wins: Erling Haaland (6 awards)
- Most recent: Erling Haaland; Caroline Graham Hansen (6th awards)
- Website: Fotball.no

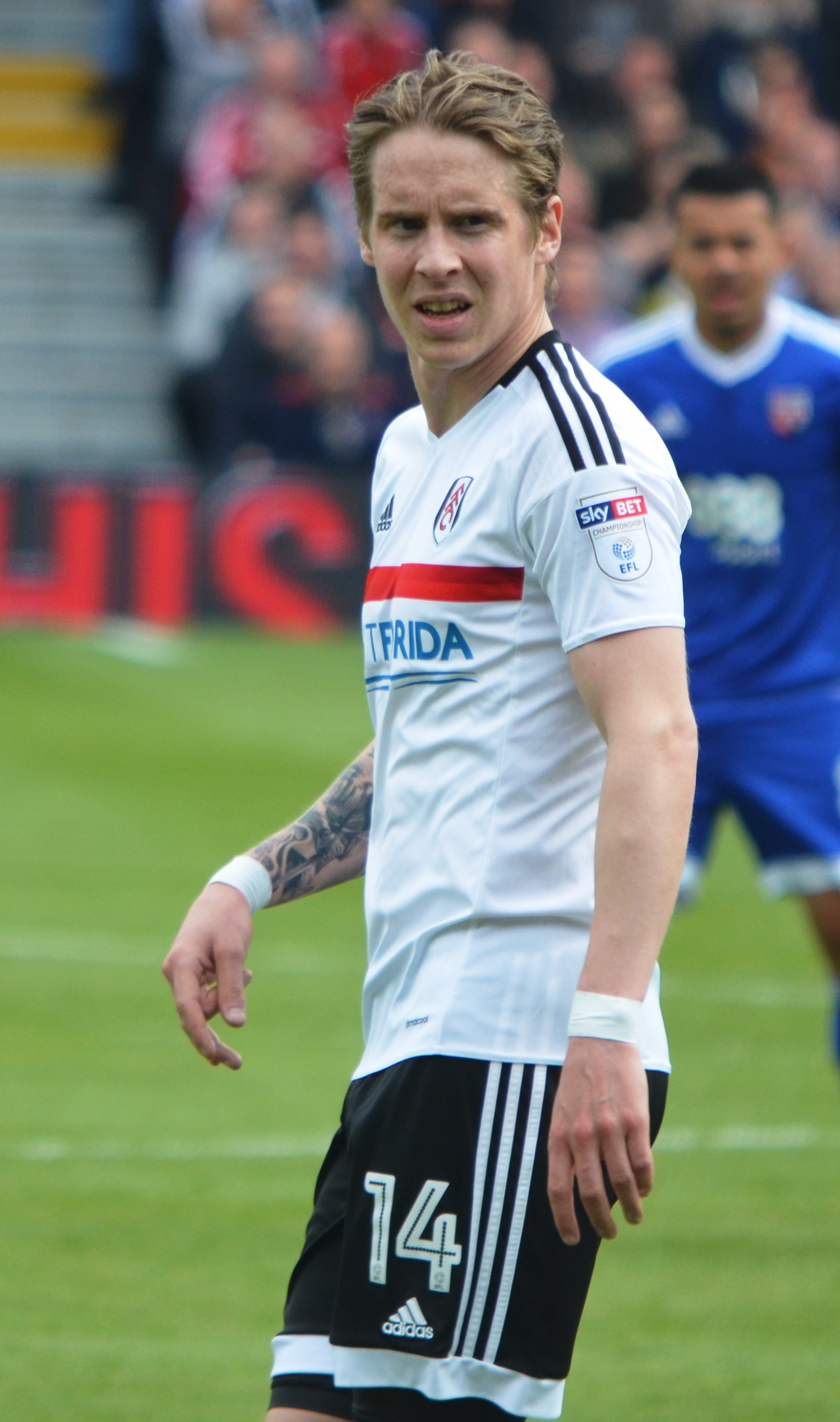
Stefan Johansen, the first recipient of Gullballen.

Gullballen (English: the Golden Ball) is a Norwegian football award given by the Norwegian Football Federation to the best male and female Norwegian footballers each year. The award replaced Kniksen of the Year as the main award given to the best Norwegian footballer in a calendar year.

The first award was given in 2014 to Stefan Johansen. Until 2018, the award was given to only one player, either male or female. In 2015, Ada Hegerberg became the first woman to win the award. Hegerberg, Caroline Graham Hansen, and Erling Haaland are the only players to have won the award more than twice. Gullballen has been given out at Norwegian sport award Idrettsgallaen since 2015.

== Winners ==
=== 2014–2017 ===
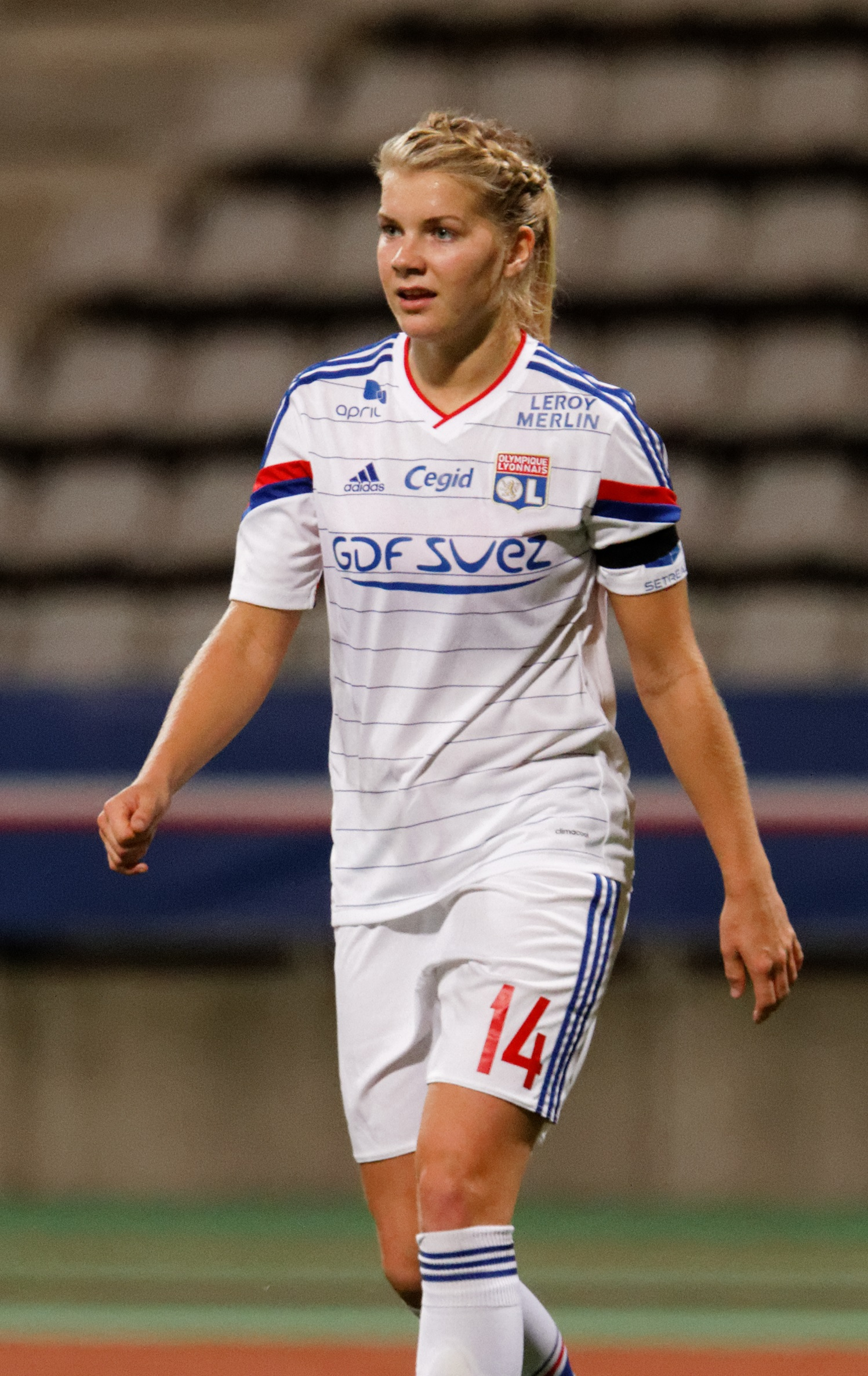
Ada Hegerberg, winner in 2015, 2016 and 2018.

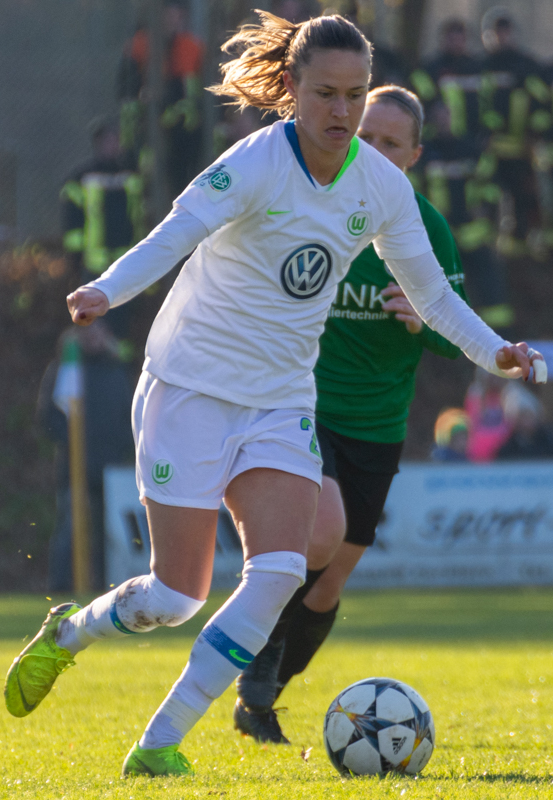
Caroline Graham Hansen, winner in 2019, 2020, 2021, 2023, 2024 and 2025.

Year	Winner	Club(s)
2014	Stefan Johansen	(Scotland) Celtic
2015	Ada Hegerberg	(France) Lyon
2016	Ada Hegerberg (2)	(France) Lyon
2017	Joshua King	(England) Bournemouth

=== 2018–present ===
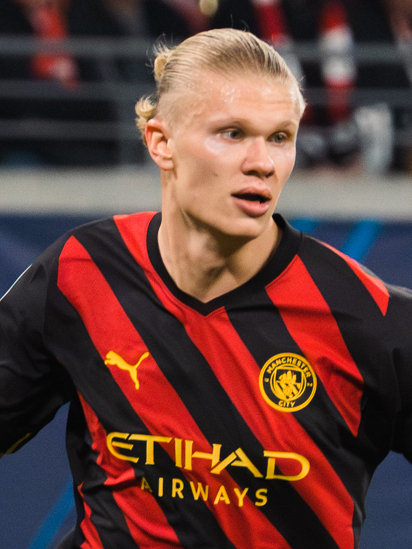
Erling Haaland, winner in 2020, 2021, 2022, 2023, 2024 and 2025.

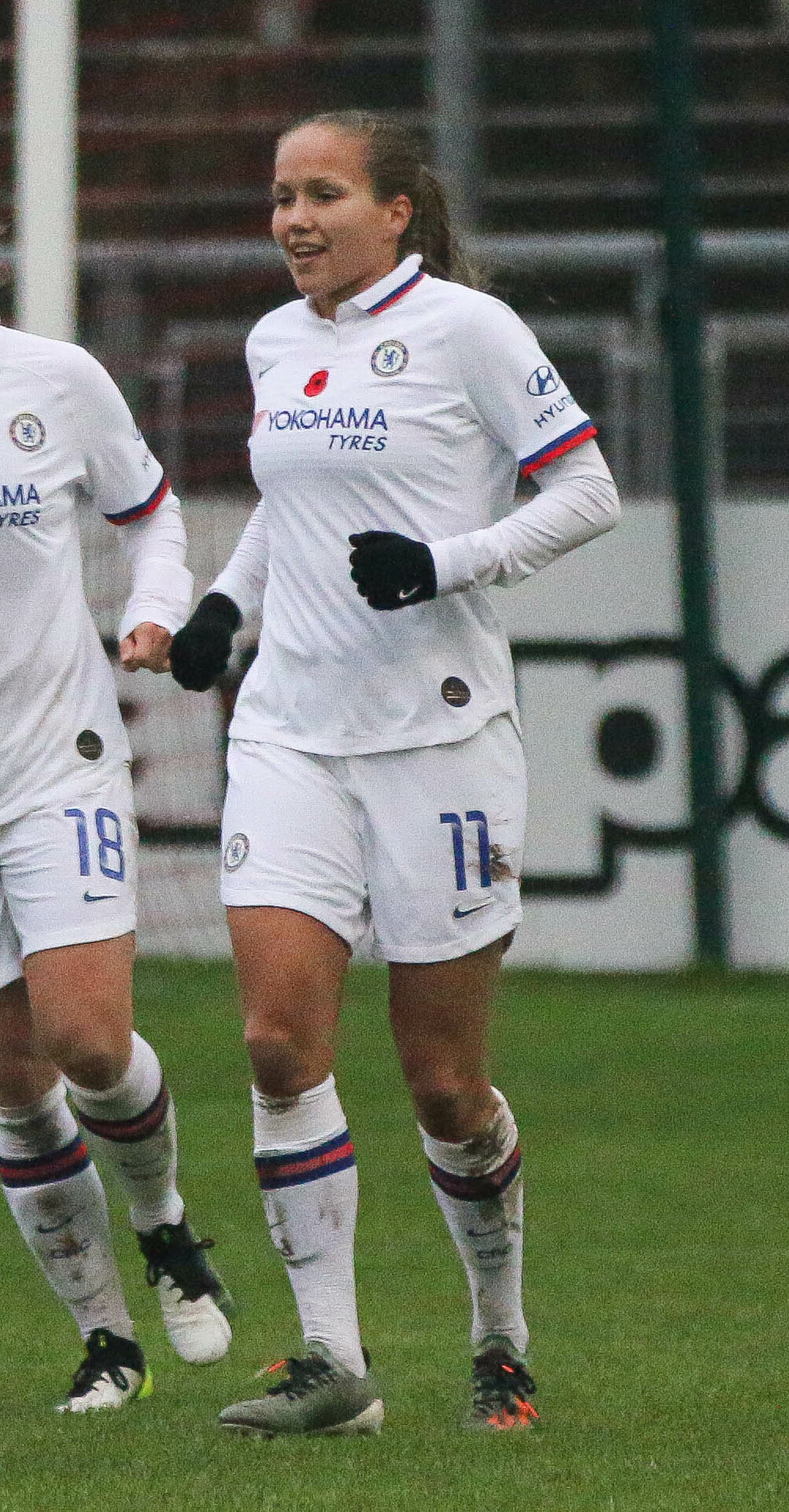
Guro Reiten, winner in 2022.

From 2018, the Gullballen has been awarded to both a male and female footballer.

Men's award
Year	Winner	Club(s)
2018	Rune Jarstein	(Germany) Hertha BSC
2019	Martin Ødegaard	(Netherlands) Vitesse (Spain) Real Sociedad
2020	Erling Haaland	(Germany) Borussia Dortmund
2021	Erling Haaland (2)	(Germany) Borussia Dortmund
2022	Erling Haaland (3)	(Germany) Borussia Dortmund (England) Manchester City
2023	Erling Haaland (4)	(England) Manchester City
2024	Erling Haaland (5)	(England) Manchester City
2025	Erling Haaland (6)	(England) Manchester City

Women's award
Year	Winner	Club(s)
2018	Ada Hegerberg (3)	(France) Lyon
2019	Caroline Graham Hansen	(Germany) VfL Wolfsburg (Spain) Barcelona
2020	Caroline Graham Hansen (2)	(Spain) Barcelona
2021	Caroline Graham Hansen (3)	(Spain) Barcelona
2022	Guro Reiten	(England) Chelsea
2023	Caroline Graham Hansen (4)	(Spain) Barcelona
2024	Caroline Graham Hansen (5)	(Spain) Barcelona
2025	Caroline Graham Hansen (6)	(Spain) Barcelona

=== By club ===
==== Men's clubs ====
Club	Wins
(England) Manchester City	4
(Germany) Borussia Dortmund	3
(England) Bournemouth	1
(Scotland) Celtic	1
(Germany) Hertha BSC	1
(Spain) Real Sociedad	1
(Netherlands) Vitesse	1

==== Women's clubs ====
Club	Wins
(Spain) Barcelona	6
(France) Lyon	3
(England) Chelsea	1
(Germany) VfL Wolfsburg	1
