= Dejana Stefanović =

Serbian footballer (born 1997)

Personal information
- Date of birth: 5 July 1997 (age 29)
- Place of birth: Kragujevac, Serbia, FR Yugoslavia
- Height: 1.71 m (5 ft 7 in)
- Position: Midfielder

Team information
- Current team: Red Star Belgrade
- Number: 22

Senior career*
Years	Team	Apps	(Gls)
2017–2018	ASPTT Albi	17	(0)
2018–2019	Avaldsnes	16	(5)
2019–2022	Vålerenga	70	(22)
2023–2025	Brighton & Hove Albion	16	(0)
2025–	Red Star Belgrade		

International career^{‡}
2018–	Serbia	25	(3)
- * Club domestic league appearances and goals as of 10 May 2025 ‡ National team caps and goals as of 20 April 2025

Dejana Stefanović (Serbian Cyrillic: Дејана Стефановић, pronounced [dějana stefǎːnovitɕ]; born 5 July 1997) is a Serbian professional footballer who plays as a midfielder for Red Star Belgrade and the Serbia women's national team.

== Career ==
Stefanović has been capped for the Serbia national team, appearing for the team during the 2019 FIFA Women's World Cup qualifying cycle.

In 2023, she signed for Brighton & Hove Albion on a one-and-a-half-year contract. On 9 August 2024 she signed a contract extension with Brighton.

On 5 May 2025, it was announced that Stefanovic would be leaving Brighton as a free agent when her contract expires in June 2025.

== Career statistics ==
=== Club ===
As of 10 May 2025.

Appearances and goals by club, season and competition
Club	Season	League			National Cup		League Cup		Continental		Total	
Club	Season	Division	Apps	Goals	Apps	Goals	Apps	Goals	Apps	Goals	Apps	Goals
ASPTT Albi	2017–18	D1 Féminine	17	0	0	0	—		—		17	0
Avaldsnes	2018	Toppserien	7	0	0	0	—		2	0	9	0
Avaldsnes	2019	Toppserien	9	5	0	0	—		—		9	5
Avaldsnes	Total		16	5	0	0	—		2	0	18	5
Vålerenga	2019	Toppserien	12	2	0	0	—		—		12	2
Vålerenga	2020	Toppserien	17	7	0	0	—		3	3	20	10
Vålerenga	2021	Toppserien	18	9	0	0	—		3	0	21	9
Vålerenga	2022	Toppserien	23	4	0	0	—		—		23	4
Vålerenga	Total		70	22	0	0	—		6	3	76	25
Brighton & Hove Albion	2022–23	WSL	6	0	0	0	0	0	—		6	0
Brighton & Hove Albion	2023–24	WSL	2	0	0	0	0	0	—		2	0
Brighton & Hove Albion	2024–25	WSL	8	0	2 (Note: Appearances in Women's FA Cup)	0	1	0	—		11	0
Brighton & Hove Albion	Total		16	0	2	0	1	0	—		19	0
Career total			119	27	2	0	1	0	8	3	130	30

== International goals ==
No.	Date	Venue	Opponent	Score	Result	Competition
1.	5 October 2019	Petar Miloševski Training Centre, Skopje, North Macedonia	North Macedonia	6–0	6–0	UEFA Women's Euro 2022 qualifying
2.	26 October 2021	Stadion Metalac, Gornji Milanovac, Serbia	Turkey	1–0	2–0	2023 FIFA Women's World Cup qualification
3.	14 July 2023	Matija Gubec Stadium, Krško, Slovenia	Slovenia	3–0	3–0	Friendly
