= Emilie Bølviken =

Norwegian footballer (born 2000)

Personal information
- Date of birth: 22 May 2000 (age 26)
- Position: Centre-back

Team information
- Current team: Stabæk
- Number: 2

Youth career
- Uvdal
- –2016: Geilo
- 2016–2018: Lyn

Senior career*
Years	Team	Apps	(Gls)
2017–2022	Lyn	60	(0)
2023–	Stabæk	89	(6)

International career
2017	Norway U17	6	(0)
- * Club domestic league appearances and goals as of 1 July 2026

Emilie Bølviken (born 22 May 2000) is a Norwegian footballer who plays as a centre-back for Stabæk.

== Career ==
She grew up in Rødberg. After playing for Uvdal IL and Geilo IL, among others captaining Geilo's boys' team, Bølviken left Buskerud behind at the age of 16 to join the youth section of Lyn. She also represented Norway U17 internationally, contesting the 2017 UEFA Women's Under-17 Championship qualification.

Bølviken made her first-team debut for Lyn in the 2017 cup. In 2019 she made her Toppserien debut. She became a regular player in the autumn of 2019.

Ahead of the 2023 season she signed for fellow Toppserien team Stabæk. In June 2026, she was honored for reaching 100 games across all competitions for Stabæk.

== Personal life ==
Bølviken has become known for environmental activism, especially speaking out against excessive consumption tied to climate change, and fast fashion tendencies in sports clothing. When becoming affiliated with Morten Thorsby's We Play Green initiative, she changed jersey number to 2 to remind people of the 2 degree climate target.

She is nicknamed "Bølla" (literally "the bully", but derived from her surname).
