= Guro Bergsvand =

Norwegian footballer (born 1994)

Personal information
- Date of birth: 3 March 1994 (age 32)
- Place of birth: Oslo, Norway
- Height: 1.75 m (5 ft 9 in)
- Position: Defender

Team information
- Current team: Fiorentina

Youth career
- Heming
- Lyn

College career
Years	Team	Apps	(Gls)
2014–2017	California Golden Bears	45	(4)

Senior career*
Years	Team	Apps	(Gls)
2011–2013	Lyn		
2014	Stabæk	6	(0)
2015–2017	Lyn	11	(3)
2018–2019	Stabæk	46	(1)
2020–2023	Brann	53	(9)
2023–2025	Brighton & Hove Albion	54	(1)
2025–2026	VfL Wolfsburg	16	(1)
2026–	Fiorentina	0	(0)

International career^{‡}
2010	Norway U16	2	(0)
2012–2013	Norway U19	16	(0)
2019	Norway U23	3	(0)
2021–	Norway	50	(7)
- * Club domestic league appearances and goals as of 14 July 2026 ‡ National team caps and goals as of 14 October 2026

Guro Bergsvand (Norwegian: [ˈɡʉːrʊ ˈbærɡsvɑn]; born 3 March 1994) is a Norwegian professional footballer who plays as a defender for Serie A club Fiorentina and the Norway women's national team.

She got her debut at the national team at the age of 27, and she scored in her first match. After the 2021 season in Toppserien, she was named the players' role model of the year. The jury said that she, among others, was an inspiration for all young players that meet adversity, doubt themselves and need evidence for what might seem impossible, is actually possible.

== Club career ==
Bergsvand started playing football for Heming, before she changed to Lyn at a young age. She was part of the team that took Lyn from division three to the first divisjon, and she became the captain of the team. Before the 2014 season, she went to Stabæk, where she played six matches during the spring in Toppserien, before she moved to the USA to play football for California Golden Bears at the University of California, Berkeley. The summer of 2015, she played a few matches for Lyn in 1.divisjon before she returned to USA.

In USA, she tore both her meniscus and one of the cruciate ligaments in the knee after she twisted it. The first time she was back again, she fell and fractured her kneecap. The injuries prevented her from playing the rest of that season in 2015, and the following season.

In 2017, she had again a short stay in Lyn in the first division and she finished her college studies.

After returning to Norway, she signed for Stabæk in 2018. After just half of the season, one of the ligaments in the same knee that was previously injured, ruptured. She managed to get back from this injury as well and played the remaining 13 matches in Toppserien and one match in the Norwegian Women's Cup for Stabæk. The Summer of 2019, Sandviken wanted to sign her, but she said no since it didn't feel right to leave Stabæk, which at that point was at the bottom of the league. Røa, Vålrenga and Kolbotn were all also among clubs that wanted to sign her.

After it became clear that Stabæk would be relegated, it became official that Bergsvand left the club and signed for Sandviken. She was in 2021 part of the team who won Toppserien for the first time in Sandviken's history. After the season, NTB, Norske Fotballkvinner and Sportkollektivet all placed her on the team of the season. She extended the contract with Sandviken, who changed name to Brann, after the 2021 season.

On 5 January 2023, Bergsvand signed a two-and-a-half-year contract with Brighton & Hove Albion. On 5 May 2025, it was announced that Bergsvand would be leaving Brighton when her contract expires in June 2025.

On 6 June 2025, it was announced that Bergsvand had signed a contract with VfL Wolfsburg until 30 June 2027.

On 15 July 2026, it was announced that Bergsvand had joined Fiorentina.

== International career ==
She has played matches for U16, U19, U23, and the national team. For the U-19 team, she played in the three group matches of the 2013 European Women's U-19 Football Championship .

The first time she was part of the national team was at the age of 27 in September 2021. She got her debut against Armenia, 16 September 2021, and she also scored the first goal of the match in her debut. At the 2022 Algarve Cup, she was used in all games involving Norway.

Bergsvand was part of the squad that was called up to the UEFA Women's Euro 2022. She was also used in all three preliminary round matches at the 2022 European Championship, coming on as a substitute twice and starting once. As in third place in the group, the Norwegians were eliminated after the group matches, just like in 2017. Qualified on September 2, 2022, she and her team defeated Belgium 1-0 in the decisive game to win the group for the World Cup in Australia and New Zealand.

On 19 June 2023, she was included in the 23-player Norwegian squad for the FIFA Women's World Cup 2023.

Appearances and goals by national team and year
National team	Year	Apps	Goals
Norway	2021	6	3
Norway	2022	13	1
Norway	2023	7	0
Norway	2024	5	0
Total		31	4

As of match played 12 July 2024

== International goals ==
No.	Date	Venue	Opponent	Score	Result	Competition
1.	16 September 2021	Ullevaal Stadion, Oslo, Norway	Armenia	1–0	10–0	2023 FIFA Women's World Cup qualification
2.	26 October 2021	Ullevaal Stadion, Oslo, Norway	Belgium	1–0	4–0	2023 FIFA Women's World Cup qualification
3.	30 November 2021	Yerevan Football Academy Stadium, Yerevan, Armenia	Armenia	8–0	10–0	2023 FIFA Women's World Cup qualification
4.	25 June 2022	Ullevaal Stadion, Oslo, Norway	New Zealand	2–0	2–0	Friendly
5.	25 October 2024	Loro Boriçi Stadium, Shkodër, Albania	Albania	2–0	5–0	UEFA Women's Euro 2025 qualifying play-offs
6.	25 October 2024	Loro Boriçi Stadium, Shkodër, Albania	Albania	3–0	5–0	UEFA Women's Euro 2025 qualifying play-offs
7.	29 November 2024	Inver Park, Larne, Northern Ireland	Northern Ireland	3–0	4–0	UEFA Women's Euro 2025 qualifying play-offs

== Honours ==
Sandviken

- Toppserien 2021

Individual

- The player's role model of the year, Toppserien 2021

== Personal life ==
Guro Bergsvand is the daughter of the retired football player Jo Bergsvand.

She has a degree in Media studies from the University of California, Berkeley. In addition to being a football player, she also works as a marketing consultant. She says that she needs to do something outside just playing football, otherwise she would get bored.
