= Kirvil Odden Sundsfjord =

Norwegian footballer (born 1992)

Kirvil Odden
Personal information
- Full name: Kirvil Odden Sundsfjord
- Date of birth: 29 July 1992 (age 34)
- Position: Goalkeeper

Team information
- Current team: Lyn

Youth career
- Snøgg

Senior career*
Years	Team	Apps	(Gls)
- Snøgg
2011	Røa	3	(0)
2012–2013	Kolbotn	25	(0)
2014–2019	Røa	60	(0)
2020–2022	Lyn	54	(0)
2022–2023	Sampdoria	5	(0)
2023–	Lyn	42	(0)

International career
2010–2011	Norway U19	7	(0)
2011–2012	Norway U20	3	(0)
2011	Norway U23	1	(0)
- * Club domestic league appearances and goals as of 8 July 2025

Kirvil Odden Sundsfjord (born 29 July 1992) is a Norwegian footballer who plays as a goalkeeper for Lyn.

== Career ==
Odden hails from Notodden Municipality and started her career in SK Snøgg. Concurrently with her football career in the Third Division, she competed on national level in age-specific track and field, mostly high jump, shot put and discus throw. In her late teenages, she moved to Oslo and had spells in Røa IL and Kolbotn IL before returning to Røa in 2014. She became Røa's first choice in 2017 following the retirement of Silje Vesterbekkmo. Odden was selected as team captain ahead of the 2018 season.

However, after the 2019 season she had lost motivation to continue, and terminated her contract. She agreed to move to city rivals Lyn. She became club captain here as well, in 2021.

In 2022 Odden was contacted and signed by Italian club Sampdoria. She played 5 Serie A games for Sampdoria. The club fell into economic disarray in 2023, allegedly with months of unpaid wages. She returned to Lyn during the summer 2023 transfer window.

== Personal life ==
Odden was born as Kirvil Schau Odden. In 2017 she married Charlotte Sundsfjord. The couple has one child. Alongside her football career, Odden has held a job as head of IT at Lysejordet Primary School.
