= Trine Skjelstad Jensen =

Norwegian footballer

Personal information
- Date of birth: 31 December 1994 (age 31)
- Height: 1.80 m (5 ft 11 in)
- Position: Central defender

Youth career
- Kvarven
- –2012: Grand Bodø

Senior career*
| Years | Team | Apps | (Gls) |
| 2012–2013 | Grand Bodø | 21 | (5) |
| 2014–2017 | Røa | 16 | (2) |
| 2017 | → Grand Bodø (loan) | 21 | (6) |
| 2018–2020 | Lyn | 46 | (3) |
| 2021–2022 | Grand Bodø | 30 | (6) |
| 2023–2024 | Lyn | 52 | (4) |
- * Club domestic league appearances and goals as of 20 May 2024

Trine Skjelstad Jensen (born 31 December 1994) is a Norwegian footballer who last played as a central defender for Lyn.

== Career ==
Jensen started her career in Kvarven UIL in Kjerringøy. Moving on to the larger team in the region, IK Grand Bodø, Jensen captained the U20 team that won the 2013 Norwegian Women's U20 Cup. Jensen scored the winning goal in the cup final against Arna-Bjørnar.

Trine Jensen and her twin sister Sofie proceeded to join Oslo-based team Røa IL in 2014. The twins played against each other in 2017, when Trine was loaned back to Grand. After a full year in Grand, Trine Jensen returned to Oslo and Lyn in 2018.

Jensen graduated with a law degree from the University of Oslo in 2018. She was a junior solicitor before choosing to serve as a deputy judge in Salten og Lofoten District Court for two years. During that period, she spent her third stint in Grand Bodø, helping them win promotion from the Second Division to the First Division.

Returning to Oslo and another spell in Lyn, she spent her civil career in the law firm Schjødt. Among several cases she has worked on, she represented the former Lyn teammate Runa Lillegård in a combined welfare and insurance dispute regarding Lillegård's football injury.

In the 2024 season, Jensen played every second of the Toppserien campaign. Internally in Lyn, she was designated as "Player of the Year", and she ranked 15th on the average grading rank of Toppserien operated by Norwegian News Agency. She was not offered a new contract in Lyn.

=== Style of play ===
Standing taller than most players in Toppserien, Trine Skjelstad Jensen is known for aerial strength.
