= 2021 Norwegian First Division (women) =

Norwegian women's football season

Norwegian First Division
- Season: 2021
- Dates: 22 May 2021 – 14 November 2021
- Champions: Røa
- Promoted: Røa
- Relegated: Grei; Fart
- Matches: 90
- Goals: 291 (3.23 per match)
- Top goalscorer: Tuva Espås (13 goals)
- Biggest home win: Røa 8–0 Hønefoss (9 October 2021)
- Biggest away win: Medkila 1–6 Fløya (16 October 2021); Grei 0–5 Røa (14 November 2021)
- Highest scoring: Røa 8–0 Hønefoss (9 October 2021); KIL/Hemne 3–5 Fløya (14 November 2021)

The 2021 Norwegian First Division was the 37th season of the Norwegian First Division, the second-tier Norwegian women's football division, and the 20th season under the current format. The league consisted of 10 teams. The season started on 22 May 2021 and ended on 14 November 2021.

Røa won the league and were thus promoted to the 2022 Toppserien. Grei and Fart were relegated to the 2022 Norwegian Second Division.

== Teams ==
Locations of teams in the 2021 1. divisjon.

The following ten teams compete in the 1. divisjon:

Club	Location	Ground
Amazon Grimstad	Grimstad	Levermyr Stadion
Fart	Hamar	Fart Kunstgress
Fløya	Tromsø	Fløya Arena
Grei	Oslo	Grei Kunstgress
Hønefoss	Hønefoss	Aka Arena
KIL/Hemne	Kyrksæterøra	Hemne Sparebank Arena
Medkila	Harstad	Harstad Stadion
Røa	Oslo	Røa Kunstgress
Øvrevoll Hosle	Bærum	Ferd Arena Hosle
Åsane	Bergen	Myrdal Stadion / Åsane Arena

== League table ==
Pos	Team	Pld	W	D	L	GF	GA	GD	Pts	Promotion, qualification or relegation
1	Røa (C, P)	18	13	5	0	54	6	+48	44	Promotion to Toppserien
2	Åsane	18	11	3	4	33	19	+14	36	Qualification for the promotion play-offs
3	Øvrevoll Hosle	18	10	5	3	39	25	+14	35	
4	Amazon Grimstad	18	10	2	6	24	20	+4	32	
5	Fløya	18	7	3	8	31	27	+4	24	
6	Hønefoss	18	7	2	9	24	35	−11	23	
7	Medkila	18	7	1	10	24	42	−18	22	
8	KIL/Hemne	18	5	2	11	27	32	−5	17	
9	Grei (R)	18	4	2	12	18	33	−15	14	Relegation to Second Division
10	Fart (R)	18	2	3	13	17	52	−35	9	Relegation to Second Division

Source: NIFS (in Norwegian)
Rules for classification: 1) Points; 2) Goal difference; 3) Goals scored; 4) Head-to-head points; 5) Head-to-head goal difference; 6) Head-to-head goals scored.
(C) Champions; (P) Promoted; (R) Relegated

== Results ==
Home \ Away	AZG	FAR	FLØ	GRE	HBK	K/H	MED	RØA	ØVH	ÅSA
Amazon Grimstad	—	3–0	1–0	3–2	2–0	1–2	1–0	0–2	1–0	1–1
Fart	1–1	—	2–2	2–0	1–2	1–4	1–2	0–2	2–2	0–2
Fløya	2–0	4–0	—	0–3	1–2	2–1	1–2	0–0	2–1	1–0
Grei	1–2	2–3	1–0	—	2–1	0–1	1–3	0–5	2–4	0–2
Hønefoss	1–2	3–1	2–1	3–1	—	3–2	0–1	0–1	1–1	4–0
KIL/Hemne	0–1	1–0	3–5	0–1	0–0	—	3–1	1–1	3–4	0–1
Medkila	0–4	4–3	1–6	1–1	4–0	2–1	—	0–4	1–2	0–1
Røa	3–0	7–0	3–0	1–1	8–0	3–1	6–0	—	1–1	3–0
Øvrevoll Hosle	1–0	6–0	3–3	1–0	4–2	3–2	3–1	0–2	—	1–0
Åsane	4–1	5–0	2–1	1–0	3–0	3–2	4–1	2–2	2–2	—

Source: Norwegian Football Federation
Legend: Blue = home team win; Yellow = draw; Red = away team win.

== Top scorers ==
Rank	Player	Club	Goals
1	(Norway) Tuva Espås	Røa	13
2	(Norway) Miriam Mjåseth	Medkila	11
3	(Norway) Katarina Dybvik Sunde	Åsane	10
4	(Norway) Joshualyn Reeves	Øvrevoll Hosle	9
5	(Norway) Mathilde Harviken	Røa	8
5	(Norway) Mia Huse	Røa	8
