= 2019 Toppserien =

Toppserien
- Season: 2019
- Champions: LSK Kvinner
- Relegated: Stabæk; Fart
- Matches: 132
- Goals: 403 (3.05 per match)
- Top goalscorer: Kennya Cordner (17 goals)
- Biggest home win: LSK Kvinner 6–0 Lyn (11 May 2019)
- Biggest away win: Fart 1–6 Klepp (16 November 2019)
- Highest scoring: Sandviken 6–4 Avaldsnes (27 April 2019)
- Total attendance: 35,571
- Average attendance: 269 ▲5.9%

The 2019 Toppserien was the 36th season of the highest women's football league in Norway. LSK Kvinner entered the season as the defending champions.

== Teams ==
Locations of teams in the 2019 Toppserien

Team	Home city	Home ground	In Toppserien since	First appearance	Seasons
Arna-Bjørnar	Ytre Arna (Bergen)	Arna Idrettspark	2006	2001	18
Avaldsnes	Avaldsnes	Avaldsnes Idrettssenter	2013	2013	7
Fart	Vang	Fartbana	2019	2008	3
Klepp	Kleppe (Stavanger)	Klepp Stadion	1987	1987	33
Kolbotn	Kolbotn (Oslo)	Sofiemyr	1995	1995	25
LSK Kvinner	Lillestrøm	LSK-Hallen	1987	1987	33
Lyn	Oslo	Kringsjå kunstgress	2018	2018	2
Røa	Røa (Oslo)	Røa kunstgress	2000	2000	20
Sandviken	Bergen	Stemmemyren	2015	1987	26
Stabæk	Bærum (Oslo)	Nadderud Stadion	2009	2009	11
Trondheims-Ørn	Trondheim	Koteng Arena	1987	1987	33
Vålerenga	Oslo	Intility Arena	2012	2012	8

== League table ==
Pos	Team	Pld	W	D	L	GF	GA	GD	Pts	Qualification or relegation
1	LSK Kvinner (C)	22	15	5	2	51	18	+33	50	Qualification for the Champions League Round of 32
2	Vålerenga	22	14	4	4	41	24	+17	46	Qualification for the Champions League qualifying round
3	Klepp	22	14	2	6	48	19	+29	44	
4	Sandviken	22	12	4	6	43	32	+11	40	
5	Avaldsnes	22	9	7	6	40	33	+7	34	
6	Røa	22	7	8	7	40	35	+5	29	
7	Trondheims-Ørn	22	8	5	9	26	22	+4	29	
8	Kolbotn	22	7	6	9	35	39	−4	27	
9	Arna-Bjørnar	22	6	5	11	26	41	−15	23	
10	Lyn (O)	22	4	8	10	23	37	−14	20	Qualification for the relegation play-offs
11	Stabæk (R)	22	3	4	15	16	43	−27	13	Relegation to First Division
12	Fart (R)	22	2	4	16	14	60	−46	10	Relegation to First Division

Source: Norges Fotballforbund (in Norwegian)
Rules for classification: 1) Points; 2) Goal difference; 3) Number of goals scored; 4) Head-to-head points; 5) Head-to-head goal difference; 6) Head-to-head away goals scored
(C) Champions; (O) Play-off winners; (R) Relegated

=== Position by round ===
Team ╲ Round	1	2	3	4	5	6	7	8	9	10	11	12	13	14	15	16	17	18	19	20	21	22
LSK Kvinner	2	4	3	1	3	3	1	1	1	1	1	1	1	1	1	1	1	1	1	1	1	1
Vålerenga	3	3	1	2	1	1	2	5	5	5	4	4	4	4	4	4	2	2	2	2	2	2
Klepp	3	2	2	3	2	2	4	2	2	2	2	2	2	2	3	2	3	4	4	3	3	3
Sandviken	12	5	4	4	4	4	3	3	3	3	3	3	3	3	2	3	4	3	3	4	4	4
Avaldsnes	10	8	7	9	10	9	10	9	10	9	7	7	8	6	6	6	5	5	5	5	5	5
Røa	1	1	5	5	6	7	6	6	6	6	6	5	5	5	5	5	6	6	6	6	6	6
Trondheims-Ørn	5	8	7	10	9	10	9	10	9	10	8	9	10	9	9	9	10	8	8	8	7	7
Kolbotn	9	11	10	8	7	5	5	4	4	4	5	6	7	8	8	8	7	7	7	7	8	8
Arna-Bjørnar	5	6	9	7	8	8	8	8	8	7	9	8	6	7	7	7	8	9	9	9	9	9
Lyn	5	6	6	6	5	6	7	7	7	8	10	10	9	10	10	10	9	10	10	10	10	10
Stabæk	10	12	12	11	11	12	12	12	12	11	12	11	12	12	11	11	11	11	11	11	11	11
Fart	5	10	11	12	12	11	11	11	11	12	11	12	11	11	12	12	12	12	12	12	12	12

Leader / Champions League qualifying round
Silver
Bronze
Relegation play-offs
Relegation to 2020 1. divisjon

Source: nifs.no

== Relegation play-offs ==
The relegation play-offs will this season be contested by the 10th placed team in Toppserien, Lyn, and the winner of the 1. divisjon, IF Fløya.

24 November 2019
16:00 CET (UTC+1)

Fløya	0–5	Lyn
	Report	Linberg 22'; Godø 39'; Lillegård 51', 59'; Eckhoff 85'

Bardufoss storhall, Bardufoss
Attendance: 350
Referee: Marit Buhaug Folstad (Buvik)
1 December 2019
12:00 CET (UTC+1)

Lyn	2–1	Fløya
Hasund 29'; Huseby 66'	Report	Simonsen 50'

Kringså kunstgress, Oslo
Attendance: 157
Referee: Sarah Fatemeh Zangeneh (Nordstrand)

Lyn won 7–1 on aggregate.

== Season statistics ==
=== Top scorers ===
Rank	Player	Club	Goals
1	(Trinidad and Tobago) Kennya Cordner	Sandviken	17
2	(Norway) Synne Jensen	Røa	16
3	(Norway) Guro Reiten	LSK Kvinner	12
3	(Norway) Elise Thorsnes	LSK Kvinner	12
5	(Norway) Maria Dybwad Brochmann	Sandviken	11
5	(England) Natasha Dowie	Vålerenga	11
5	(Cameroon) Ajara Nchout Njoya	Vålerenga	11
8	(Norway) Runa Lillegård	Lyn	10
8	(Jamaica) Havana Solaun	Klepp	10
8	(Australia) Tameka Yallop	Klepp	10

=== Discipline ===
==== Player ====
- Most yellow cards: 5
  - (Netherlands) Sherida Spitse (Vålerenga)
- Most red cards: 1
  - (Australia) Aivi Luik (Avaldsnes)
  - (Norway) Rikke Nygard (Arna-Bjørnar)
  - (Norway) Maria Sørenes (Avaldsnes)
  - (Norway) My Haugland Sørsdahl (Kolbotn)
  - (Belgium) Justine Vanhaevermaet (Røa)
  - (Norway) Ina Lundereng Vårhus (Trondheims-Ørn)
  - (Netherlands) Maruschka Waldus (Vålerenga)

==== Club ====
- Most yellow cards: 26
  - Røa
- Most red cards: 2
  - Avaldsnes
