= Lyn Fotball Damer =

Lyn Fotball
- Full name: Lyn Fotball Damer
- Ground: Kringsjå kunstgress Oslo
- Capacity: 450
- Chairman: Tone Etholm
- Manager: Ole Johan Aas
- League: Toppserien
- 2026: Toppserien, 5th
Home colours	Away colours

Lyn Fotball Damer is the women's football branch of Lyn Fotball. The team plays in Toppserien, the top division of women's football in Norway.

Lyn formed a women's team in the fifth tier 4. divisjon in 2009. The team promoted to the second tier in 2012, their third consecutive promotion. In 2017, after five seasons spent in 1. divisjon, Lyn promoted to the 2018 Toppserien. The team finished their first top tier season in eleventh place, and became tenth in the 2019 season.

Lyn Fotball Damer play their home games at Kringsjå kunstgress, a stadium which was renovated in 2016.

== Players ==
=== Current squad ===
As of 1 August 2020

Note: Flags indicate national team as defined under FIFA eligibility rules; some limited exceptions apply. Players may hold more than one non-FIFA nationality.

No.	Pos.	Nation	Player
1	GK	NOR	Karen Oline Sneve
2	MF	NOR	Hedda Myhre Foslie
3	MF	NOR	Julie Jorde
4	DF	NOR	Trine Skjelstad Jensen
5	DF	NOR	Christina Osnes-Ringen
6	FW	NOR	Kristin Haugstad
8	MF	NOR	Anna Palm
10	FW	NOR	Runa Lillegård

No.	Pos.	Nation	Player
11	MF	NOR	Ingrid Bakke
12	GK	NOR	Kirvil Odden
14	DF	NOR	Joanna Bækkelund
16	FW	NOR	Anna Aahjem
18	MF	NOR	Selma Hernes
21	FW	NOR	Una Søyland
22	DF	NOR	Sofie Tunes
23	DF	NOR	Emilie Raaum Closs
24	DF	NOR	Iselin Sandnes Olsen
31	GK	NOR	Mari Hasselknippe
—	DF	NOR	Maja Nordahl

== Recent seasons ==
Season		Pos.	Pl.	W	D	L	GS	GA	P	Cup	Notes	Ref.
2015	1. divisjon	5	22	12	2	8	59	38	38	Second round		
2016	1. divisjon	2	22	15	3	4	63	28	48	Second round		
2017	1. divisjon	↑ 1	22	15	4	3	43	16	49	Third round	Promoted to Toppserien	
2018	Toppserien	11	22	3	3	16	27	56	12	Third round		
2019	Toppserien	10	22	4	8	10	23	37	20	Second round		
2020	Toppserien	6	18	6	3	9	24	30	21	First Round		
2021	Toppserien	9	18	3	3	12	19	34	12	Second Round		
2022	Toppserien	6	18	7	5	6	22	26	26	Fourth round		
2022	Toppserien	1	7	4	3	0	14	8	15	Fourth round		
2023	Toppserien	6	27	7	7	13	33	44	28	Semi Final		
2024	Toppserien	6	27	9	6	12	25	41	33	Third Round		
2025	Toppserien	7	27	6	7	14	31	52	25	Second Round		
2026	Toppserien	5	22	10	5	7	43	32	35	Quarter-final		

== Honours ==
- 1. divisjon
  - Winners: 2017
