= Guro Reiten =

Norwegian footballer (born 1994)

- Reiten with Gotham FC in 2026

Personal information
- Date of birth: 26 July 1994 (age 32)
- Place of birth: Sunndalsøra, Norway
- Height: 1.67 m (5 ft 6 in)
- Positions: Winger; left-back

Team information
- Current team: Gotham FC
- Number: 18

Youth career
- Sunndal
- Kattem
- Trondheims-Ørn

Senior career*
Years	Team	Apps	(Gls)
2010	Sunndal	1	(0)
2011–2012	Kattem	35	(11)
2013–2016	Trondheims-Ørn	82	(25)
2017–2019	LSK Kvinner	53	(51)
2019–2026	Chelsea	119	(37)
2026	→ Gotham FC (loan)	6	(0)
2026–	Gotham FC	19	(2)

International career^{‡}
2008–2009	Norway U15	7	(1)
2009–2010	Norway U16	17	(5)
2010–2011	Norway U17	8	(2)
2011–2013	Norway U19	26	(10)
2012	Norway U20	8	(1)
2013–2016	Norway U23	14	(2)
2014–	Norway	114	(22)
- * Club domestic league appearances and goals as of 1 November 2026 ‡ National team caps and goals as of 13 October 2026

Guro Reiten (Norwegian: [ˈɡʉːrʊ ˈræɪtn̩]; born 26 July 1994) is a Norwegian professional footballer who plays as a winger or left-back for National Women's Soccer League (NWSL) club Gotham FC and the Norway national team. She previously played seven seasons for English club Chelsea, making over 200 appearances and winning six Women's Super League titles. Before that, she played in Norway for Sunndal, Kattem, Trondheims-Ørn, and LSK Kvinner. Reiten made her debut for Norway in 2014 and has represented the team at several UEFA Women's Championships and FIFA Women's World Cups.

== Club career ==
=== Early career ===
Born in Sunndalsøra, Møre og Romsdal, Reiten began her senior career with local side Sunndal, then in the second division of the Norwegian football.

At age 16, Reiten joined Toppserien side Kattem in 2011. During her year-and-a-half spell with Kattem, she made 35 league appearances and scored 11 goals in her second season, becoming the club's 2012 top scorer.

After Kattem pulled out of the Toppserien, Reiten joined Trondheims-Ørn in 2013. During her four seasons with Trondheims, she made 82 league appearances and scored 25 goals. With Trondheims-Ørn, she has also reached the final of the 2014 Norwegian Cup.

=== LSK Kvinner ===
Reiten then transferred to Toppserien side LSK Kvinner for the 2017 season. With the club, she won the league title in 2017 and was the Toppserien's regular season top scorer with 18 goals. Reiten repeated both feats in 2018, this time with 21 goals, as well as winning the 2018 Norwegian Cup, scoring a brace in the final against IL Sandviken. In addition, she won the 2018 Toppserien Player of the Year and Goal of the Year awards. Her performances in 2018 saw her shortlisted for the Norway's Footballer of the Year award. At the time of her departure from LSK Kvinner, Reiten was the Toppserien's leading scorer in the 2019 season.

=== Chelsea ===
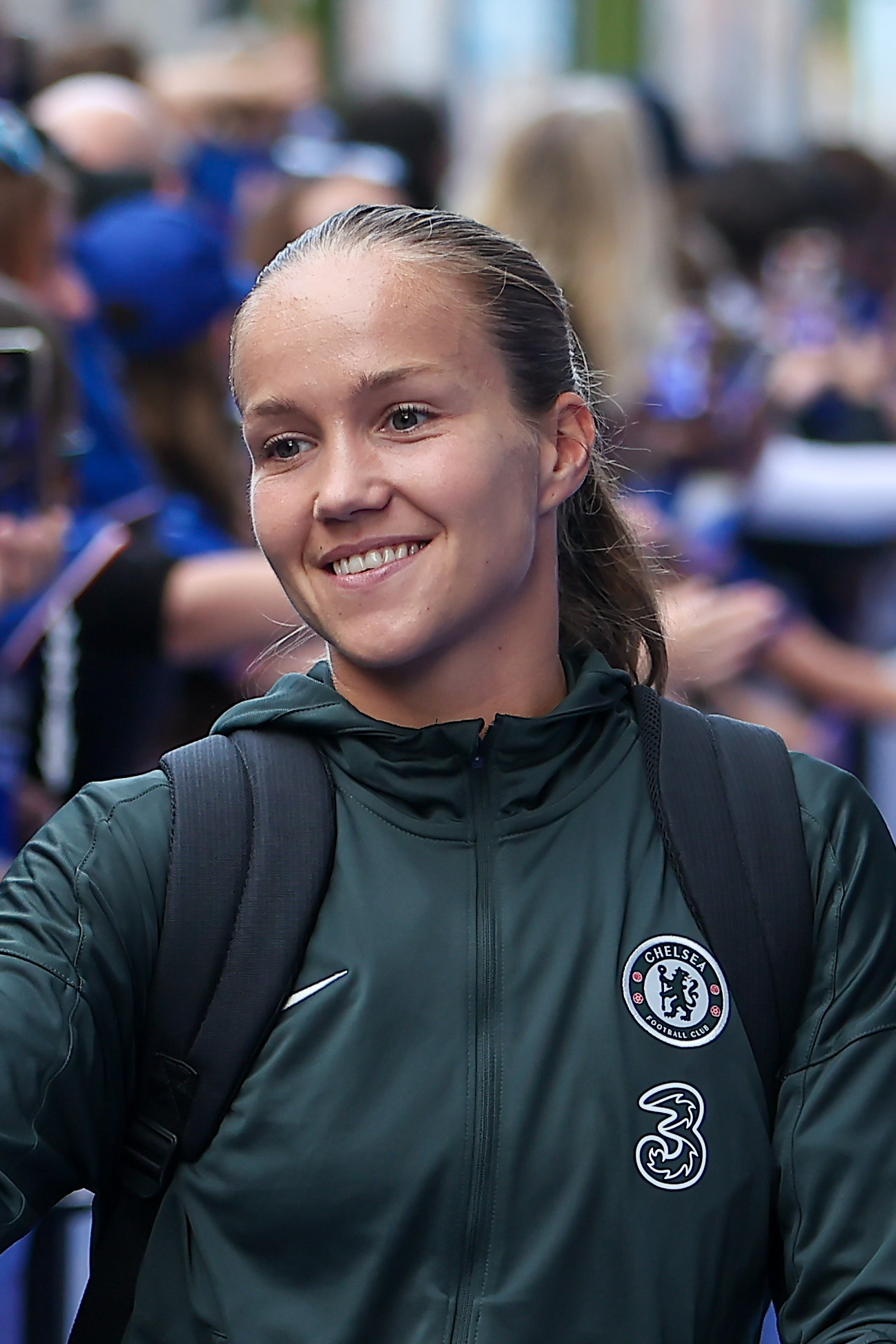
Reiten with Chelsea in 2025

On 31 May 2019, Reiten signed with the Women's Super League (WSL) side Chelsea. It was reported that the transfer fee was around 100,000 Norwegian kroner. In her first season with Chelsea, Reiten made 23 appearances and scored 7 goals across all competitions. She featured less frequently for Chelsea in the 2020–21 season, mostly coming off the bench, scoring one goal in nineteen league appearances. In the same season, she scored in the 2021 FA Women's League Cup final against Bristol City as Chelsea retained the trophy. Reiten's third season at Chelsea saw her play more often as a left wing-back. In this campaign, Reiten scored eleven goals and earned a place in the PFA WSL Team of the Year.

In 2022–23, Reiten won her fourth consecutive WSL title with Chelsea and made 39 appearances in all competitions, the most of any player in the squad. She scored 13 goals across the season, including the winning goal in the first leg of the Champions League quarter-final against Lyon, and also scored Chelsea's only goal in the 2–1 aggregate semi-final defeat against Barcelona. At the start of the 2023–24 season in October, Reiten scored a 96th-minute equaliser against Manchester City in a 1–1 draw. In the same month, she suffered an ankle ligament injury and was sidelined until December. During this period, she extended her contract with Chelsea until 2026 and was nominated for the 2023 Ballon d'Or Féminin.

In the final home game of the 2023–24 season against Bristol City, Reiten scored four goals in an 8–0 win, putting Chelsea one goal ahead of Manchester City on goal difference with two games to go. On the final day of the season, she provided two assists in a 6–0 win against Manchester United to win her fifth successive WSL title as Chelsea won the title on goal difference.

At the time of her departure from Chelsea in March 2026, Reiten had made 207 appearances and scored 59 goals for the club.

=== Gotham FC ===
On 12 March 2026, Reiten joined National Women's Soccer League (NWSL) club Gotham FC. Initially joining on loan from Chelsea, she signed for the club on a permanent deal as a free agent on 1 July 2026 after her contract with Chelsea expired, signing a three-year deal until 2029. She made her NWSL debut on 25 April 2026, starting at left-back in place of the injured Lilly Reale in a 3–0 victory over Bay FC. On 1 November 2026, the last day of the season, she tapped in the opening goal in a 2–0 win over the Utah Royals as Gotham clinched their first NWSL Shield.

== International career ==
=== Youth career ===
Reiten has represented Norway at all youth international levels from under-15 to under-23. As a 13-year-old, she was already selected for the under-15 national team to play a match in Kristiansund. In April 2010, Reiten represented the under-17 team at the 2010 UEFA Under-17 Championship in Switzerland, where Norway were eliminated in the second qualifying round, finishing second in their group behind Germany.

She made her under-19 debut on 30 May 2011 in the opening game of the 2011 UEFA Under-19 Championship against Germany, which her team lost 3–1. Reiten made four appearances at the tournament and scored one goal, against Spain in the group stage. Norway eventually reached the final where they lost 8–1 to Germany and finished the tournament as silver medalists. The semi-final finish qualified Norway for the 2012 FIFA U-20 World Cup in Japan, where the team was once again defeated by Germany, this time in the quarter-finals, with Reiten appearing in three of Norway's four games at the tournament, including a 4–1 group stage victory over Argentina where she played full 90 minutes.

After a successful qualifying campaign for the 2013 UEFA Under-19 Championship, in which Reiten scored three goals in six matches and was the team's joint top scorer, she led Norway at the main tournament in Wales as team captain. The team failed to qualify for the knockout stages after finishing third in Group B, behind Germany and Finland, with three points from three matches, winning the only game of the tournament against Sweden 5–0. Reiten played in all three matches.

Between 2013 and 2016, Reiten made 14 appearances for the under-23 team, but did not feature in any UEFA or FIFA tournaments.

=== Senior career ===
On 14 January 2014, Reiten made her senior team debut in a friendly tournament in La Manga against Spain, coming on as a 63rd-minute substitute for Elise Thorsnes in an eventual 2–1 victory. Three days later, she was included in the starting lineup for the first time, in a 1–1 draw with England, where she played the full 90 minutes. On 13 February, Reiten played her first competitive match against Greece in a 2015 World Cup qualifiers, where she again played the full 90 minutes, before representing Norway at the 2014 Algarve Cup a month later.

After two appearances in the last two World Cup qualifying matches in September 2014, through which Norway qualified for the 2015 World Cup, Reiten had to wait more than two years for her next appearance, and in the meantime she played for the under-23 national team. She returned to the Norwegian squad in March 2017 for the 2017 Algarve Cup and made three appearances at the tournament. Reiten also managed to score her first senior goal in the process, against tournament hosts Portugal, scoring her team's second goal in a 2–0 win only three minutes after being substituted in.

Reiten represented Norway at UEFA Euro 2017, where she came on as a substitute in the opening game against the Netherlands. She also played in the last group match against Denmark, however, she was unable to prevent her team from being eliminated without a single point or goal for the first time in a major tournament. After an unsuccessful European Championship campaign, Norway played qualifiers for the 2019 World Cup. Reiten played in all eight matches and scored four goals, including a brace against Northern Ireland in the opening game, as Norway qualified for the World Cup finals with a first-place finish and seven wins from eight games.

Reiten had her first tournament success in 2019 by winning the Algarve Cup. On 2 May, she was included in the squad for the 2019 World Cup, her first World Cup. At the World Cup, she played in all five of Norway's matches. In the opening game against Nigeria, she scored the first goal of the tournament for Norway and was named the best player on the pitch for her goal and assist. A 3–0 defeat to England in the quarter-finals saw her and her team eliminated, also missing out on the 2020 Summer Olympics.

In the Euro 2022 qualifiers, Reiten featured in all six of Norway's matches and scored four goals, including the 1–0 winner against Wales. In the 2023 World Cup qualifiers that followed, she also played in all ten games and netted two goals.

In June 2022, Reiten was called-up to the Norwegian national team for the 2022 European Championship finals. She appeared in all three group matches, starting with a match against Euro newcomers Northern Ireland, in which she scored Norway's last goal in a 4–1 win. They then suffered the heaviest defeat in their international history against England, 8–0. Norway failed to qualify for the knockout rounds of the European Championship for the second consecutive time after losing 1–0 to Austria in the last game, finishing third in their group.

In June 2023, she was named in the 23-player Norwegian squad for the 2023 World Cup. She appeared in all four of Norway's matches at the final tournament, scoring two goals. Two years later, Reiten represented Norway at UEFA Euro 2025.

== Personal life ==
Following the 2022 Oslo shooting, Reiten publicly came out as a lesbian in an interview with the Norwegian newspaper Verdens Gang. In November 2025, her partner Julie Nilssen gave birth to a son.

== Career statistics ==
=== Club ===
As of match played 15 November 2026

Appearances and goals by club, season and competition
Club	Season	Division	League		National cup (Note: Includes Norwegian Women's Cup, Women's FA Cup)		League cup (Note: Includes Women's League Cup, NWSL Challenge Cup)		Continental (Note: Includes UEFA Women's Champions League, CONCACAF W Champions Cup)		Other		Total	
Club	Season	Division	Apps	Goals	Apps	Goals	Apps	Goals	Apps	Goals	Apps	Goals	Apps	Goals
Kattem	2011	Toppserien	13	0	0	0	—		—		—		13	0
Kattem	2012	Toppserien	22	11	1	1	—		—		1 (Note: Appearance in Toppserien relegation play-offs)	0	24	12
Kattem	Total		35	11	1	1	0	0	0	0	1	0	37	12
Trondheims-Ørn	2013	Toppserien	21	6	2	0	—		—		—		23	6
Trondheims-Ørn	2014	Toppserien	20	7	4	1	—		—		—		24	8
Trondheims-Ørn	2015	Toppserien	20	3	4	0	—		—		—		24	3
Trondheims-Ørn	2016	Toppserien	21	9	4	0	—		—		—		25	9
Trondheims-Ørn	Total		82	25	14	1	0	0	0	0	0	0	96	26
LSK Kvinner	2017	Toppserien	22	18	3	1	—		—		—		25	19
LSK Kvinner	2018	Toppserien	21	21	5	6	—		4	0	—		30	27
LSK Kvinner	2019	Toppserien	10	12	1	2	—		6	1	—		17	15
LSK Kvinner	Total		53	51	9	9	0	0	10	1	0	0	72	61
Chelsea	2019–20	WSL	15	5	3	1	6	1	—		—		24	7
Chelsea	2020–21	WSL	19	1	3	1	5	4	8	0	1 (Note: Appearance in Women's FA Community Shield)	0	36	6
Chelsea	2021–22	WSL	21	7	3	3	3	0	6	1	—		33	11
Chelsea	2022–23	WSL	21	9	5	1	3	1	10	2	—		39	13
Chelsea	2023–24	WSL	16	7	3	0	2	0	8	2	—		29	9
Chelsea	2024–25	WSL	17	8	3	1	2	1	7	2	—		29	12
Chelsea	2025–26	WSL	10	0	2	1	2	0	3	0	—		17	1
Chelsea	Total		119	37	22	8	23	7	42	7	1	0	207	59
Gotham FC	2026	NWSL	25	2	—		1	0	2	0	2 (Note: Appearances in NWSL playoffs)	0	30	2
Career total			314	126	46	19	24	7	54	8	4	0	442	160

=== International ===
As of match played 13 October 2026

Appearances and goals by national team and year
National team	Year	Apps	Goals
Norway	2014	9	0
Norway	2017	11	4
Norway	2018	11	1
Norway	2019	16	4
Norway	2020	5	1
Norway	2021	8	4
Norway	2022	15	3
Norway	2023	11	2
Norway	2024	11	2
Norway	2025	9	0
Norway	2026	8	1
Total		114	22

Scores and results list Norway's goal tally first, score column indicates score after each Reiten goal.

List of international goals scored by Guro Reiten
No.	Date	Venue	Opponent	Score	Result	Competition
1	8 March 2017	Bela Vista Municipal Stadium, Parchal, Portugal	Portugal	2–0	2–0	2017 Algarve Cup
2	15 September 2017	Nye Fredrikstad Stadion, Fredrikstad, Norway	Northern Ireland	1–0	4–1	2019 World Cup qualification
3	15 September 2017	Nye Fredrikstad Stadion, Fredrikstad, Norway	Northern Ireland	4–1	4–1	2019 World Cup qualification
4	19 September 2017	Sarpsborg Stadion, Sarpsborg, Norway	Slovakia	3–0	6–1	2019 World Cup qualification
5	31 August 2018	NTC Senec, Senec, Slovakia	Slovakia	2–0	4–0	2019 World Cup qualification
6	8 June 2019	Stade Auguste-Delaune, Reims, France	Nigeria	1–0	3–0	2019 FIFA Women's World Cup
7	30 August 2019	Seaview, Belfast, Northern Ireland	Northern Ireland	1–0	6–0	UEFA Women's Euro 2022 qualifying
8	4 October 2019	Borisov Arena, Barysaw, Belarus	Belarus	4–1	7–1	UEFA Women's Euro 2022 qualifying
9	8 November 2019	Viking Stadion, Stavanger, Norway	Northern Ireland	3–0	6–0	UEFA Women's Euro 2022 qualifying
10	22 September 2020	Ullevaal Stadion, Oslo, Norway	Wales	1–0	1–0	UEFA Women's Euro 2022 qualifying
11	8 April 2021	King Baudouin Stadium, Brussels, Belgium	Belgium	1–0	2–0	Friendly
12	13 April 2021	BRITA-Arena, Wiesbaden, Germany	Germany	1–0	1–3	Friendly
13	25 November 2021	Arena Kombëtare, Tirana, Albania	Albania	2–0	7–0	2023 FIFA Women's World Cup qualification
14	30 November 2021	Yerevan Football Academy Stadium, Yerevan, Armenia	Armenia	5–0	10–0	2023 FIFA Women's World Cup qualification
15	29 June 2022	Viborg Stadium, Viborg, Denmark	Denmark	1–1	2–1	Friendly
16	29 June 2022	Viborg Stadium, Viborg, Denmark	Denmark	2–1	2–1	Friendly
17	7 July 2022	St Mary's Stadium, Southampton, England	Northern Ireland	4–1	4–1	UEFA Women's Euro 2022
18	30 July 2023	Eden Park, Auckland, New Zealand	Philippines	5–0	6–0	2023 FIFA Women's World Cup
19	5 August 2023	Wellington Regional Stadium, Wellington, New Zealand	Japan	1–1	1–3	2023 FIFA Women's World Cup
20	12 July 2024	Veritas Stadion, Turku, Finland	Finland	1–0	1–1	UEFA Women's Euro 2025 qualifying
21	29 October 2024	Ullevaal Stadion, Oslo, Norway	Albania	8–0	9–0	UEFA Women's Euro 2025 qualifying play-offs
22	9 October 2026	Arcul de Triumf Stadium, Bucharest, Romania	Romania	1–0	2–0	2027 FIFA Women's World Cup qualification play-offs

== Honours ==
LSK Kvinner

- Toppserien: 2017, 2018
- Norwegian Women's Cup: 2018

Chelsea

- Women's Super League: 2019–20, 2020–21, 2021–22, 2022–23, 2023–24, 2024–25
- Women's FA Cup: 2020–21, 2021–22, 2022–23, 2024–25
- Women's League Cup: 2019–20, 2020–21, 2024–25; runner-up: 2021–22, 2022–23, 2023–24
- Women's FA Community Shield: 2020
- UEFA Women's Champions League runner-up: 2020–21

Gotham FC

- NWSL Shield: 2026
- NWSL Challenge Cup: 2026

Norway

- Algarve Cup: 2019

Individual

- Toppserien Golden Boot: 2017, 2018
- Toppserien Player of the Year: 2018
- Toppserien Goal of the Year: 2018
- Women's Super League PFA Team of the Year: 2021–22, 2022–23
- Norwegian Golden Ball: 2022

== See also ==
- List of women's footballers with 100 or more international caps
