= 2021 Toppserien =

38th season of top women's football (soccer) league in Norway

Toppserien
- Season: 2021
- Dates: 22 May 2021 – 13 November 2021
- Champions: Sandviken
- Relegated: Klepp
- Champions League: Sandviken; Rosenborg
- Matches: 90
- Goals: 303 (3.37 per match)
- Top goalscorer: Emilie Haavi (13 goals)
- Biggest home win: Sandviken 8–0 Klepp (7 November 2021)
- Biggest away win: Arna-Bjørnar 0–8 Vålerenga (17 October 2021)
- Highest scoring: Vålerenga 5–3 Avaldsnes (22 May 2021); Rosenborg 7–1 Arna-Bjørnar (9 October 2021); Arna-Bjørnar 0–8 Vålerenga (17 October 2021); Sandviken 8–0 Klepp (7 November 2021)

The 2021 Toppserien was the 38th season of the highest women's football league in Norway. The season started on 22 May 2021 and ended on 13 November 2021.

Sandviken won their first Toppserien title. Rosenborg were the runners-up.

== Format ==
The league consists of 10 teams this season, which will play each other twice (home and away) totalling 18 matches per team.

== Teams ==
Locations of teams in the 2021 Toppserien

=== Teams information ===
Team	Home city	Home ground	Seasons
Arna-Bjørnar	Indre Arna (Bergen)	Arna Idrettspark	20
Avaldsnes	Avaldsnes	Avaldsnes Idrettssenter	9
Klepp	Kleppe	Klepp Stadion	35
Kolbotn	Kolbotn	Sofiemyr Stadion	27
LSK Kvinner	Lillestrøm	LSK-Hallen	35
Lyn	Oslo	Kringsjå kunstgress	4
Rosenborg	Trondheim	Koteng Arena	35
Sandviken	Bergen	Stemmemyren	28
Stabæk	Bærum	Nadderud Stadion	12
Vålerenga	Oslo	Intility Arena	10

== League table ==
Pos	Team	Pld	W	D	L	GF	GA	GD	Pts	Qualification or relegation
1	Sandviken (C)	18	17	1	0	50	6	+44	52	Qualification for the Champions League first round
2	Rosenborg	18	16	0	2	42	15	+27	48	Qualification for the Champions League first round
3	LSK Kvinner	18	12	1	5	46	32	+14	37	
4	Vålerenga	18	11	2	5	46	17	+29	35	
5	Arna-Bjørnar	18	6	3	9	27	44	−17	21	
6	Kolbotn	18	6	2	10	21	31	−10	20	
7	Stabæk	18	5	2	11	15	36	−21	17	
8	Avaldsnes	18	3	3	12	25	35	−10	12	
9	Lyn (O)	18	3	3	12	19	34	−15	12	Qualification for the relegation play-offs
10	Klepp (R)	18	2	1	15	12	53	−41	7	Relegation to First Division

Source: Soccerway
Rules for classification: 1) Points; 2) Goal difference; 3) Number of goals scored; 4) Head-to-head points; 5) Head-to-head goal difference; 6) Head-to-head away goals scored
(C) Champions; (O) Play-off winners; (R) Relegated

== Results ==
Home \ Away	ARN	AVA	KLE	KOL	LSK	LYN	ROS	SAN	STA	VAL
Arna-Bjørnar	—	3–0	3–1	2–2	3–4	3–1	0–2	1–1	1–0	0–8
Avaldsnes	1–3	—	3–0	3–1	2–3	0–1	0–1	0–1	1–1	1–1
Klepp	4–1	0–4	—	1–2	1–5	1–1	0–3	1–3	1–0	1–3
Kolbotn	1–0	2–2	3–0	—	1–2	1–0	1–2	1–3	1–2	1–2
LSK Kvinner	5–2	4–3	2–0	5–2	—	3–2	0–3	0–2	4–0	1–1
Lyn	1–1	3–1	2–0	0–1	1–2	—	1–2	1–2	2–2	0–1
Rosenborg	7–1	1–0	2–1	3–0	2–1	3–2	—	0–2	2–0	2–1
Sandviken	4–0	3–0	8–0	1–0	4–1	5–0	2–0	—	3–0	3–0
Stabæk	0–3	2–1	1–0	0–1	1–3	2–1	2–5	1–2	—	0–5
Vålerenga	2–0	5–3	7–0	3–0	2–1	4–0	1–2	0–1	0–1	—

Source: Norwegian Football Federation
Legend: Blue = home team win; Yellow = draw; Red = away team win.

== Relegation play-offs ==
The league's ninth placed team, Lyn, faced Åsane, the 2021 First Division runners-up, in a two-legged play-off to decide who would play in the 2022 Toppserien.

17 November 2021
13:00 CET

Lyn	2–1	Åsane
Aahjem 4'; Olsen 54'	Report	Vestbøstad 89'

Kringsjå Stadion, Oslo
Attendance: 123
Referee: Henrikke Holm Nervik
21 November 2021
13:00 CET

Åsane	0–1	Lyn
	Report	Tandberg 13'

Åsane Arena, Bergen
Attendance: 514
Referee: Karoline Marie Jensen

Lyn won 3–1 on aggregate and both teams remained in their respective leagues.

== Season statistics ==
=== Top scorers ===
Rank	Player	Club	Goals
1	(Norway) Emilie Haavi	LSK Kvinner	13
2	(Norway) Synne Jensen	Vålerenga	11
2	(Norway) Lisa-Marie Utland	Rosenborg	11
4	(Norway) Julie Blakstad	Rosenborg	10
4	(Norway) Maria Brochmann	Sandviken	10
6	(Norway) Sophie Romàn Haug	LSK Kvinner	9
6	(Serbia) Dejana Stefanović	Vålerenga	9
8	(Norway) Sara Kanutte Fornes	Rosenborg	7
8	(Norway) Marit Bratberg Lund	Sandviken	7
10	(Norway) Vilde Hasund	Sandviken	6

=== Disciplinary ===
==== Players ====
Updated to matches played on 26 June 2021

Rank	Player	Club	Yellow Card	Red Card	Points
1	(Norway) Sara Lindbak Hørte	Kolbotn	2	0	2
1	(Norway) Ingeborg Lye Skretting	Klepp	2	0	2
1	(Norway) Olaug Tvedten	Avaldsnes	2	0	2
1	(Serbia) Dejana Stefanović	Vålerenga	2	0	2

Points classification: Yellow card - 1 point, Red card - 3 points.

==== Club ====
Updated to matches played on 26 June 2021

Rank	Club	Yellow Card	Red Card	Points
1	Kolbotn	6	0	6
1	LSK Kvinner	6	0	6
3	Avaldsnes	4	0	4
3	Klepp	4	0	4
5	Arna-Bjørnar	3	0	3
5	Sandviken	3	0	3
5	Vålerenga	3	0	3
8	Lyn	2	0	2
8	Rosenborg	2	0	2
8	Stabæk	2	0	2

Points classification: Yellow card = 1 point, Red card = 3 points

=== Awards ===
Best XI
Goalkeeper	(Sweden) Moa Edrud (Arna-Bjørnar)			
Defenders	(Norway) Ingrid Ryland (Sandviken)	(Norway) Guro Bergsvand (Sandviken)	(Norway) Emilie Bragstad (Rosenborg)	(Norway) Marit Bratberg Lund (Sandviken)
Midfielders	(Norway) Lisa Naalsund (Sandviken)		(Norway) Emilie Joramo (Rosenborg)	(Serbia) Dejana Stefanović (Vålerenga)
Forwards	(Norway) Julie Blakstad (Rosenborg)		(Norway) Sophie Román Haug (LSK Kvinner)	(Norway) Emilie Haavi (LSK Kvinner)
