= Medkila IL =

Norwegian football club

Medkila
- Full name: Medkila Idrettslag
- Founded: 1944; 82 years ago
- Ground: Harstad Stadion, Harstad, Norway
- Chairman: Evan Didriksen
- Manager: Margunn Haugenes (women)
- League: 1. divisjon (women) (women); 2. divisjon (men)
- 2020: 1. divisjon, 2nd (women)
Home colours	Away colours

Medkila IL is a football team from Harstad in North Norway, most notable for its women's football team, which plays in the 1. divisjon, the second tier of Norwegian women's football.

Medkila first came to prominence after winning the 2003 Norwegian Women's Cup while playing in the First Division. Medkila knocked out Leknes FK (1–10), Grand Bodø (1–5), IF Fløya (2–1), IL Sandviken (6–1) and Team Strømmen (1–3), and beat Kolbotn (2–1) in the final. That same year, they were promoted to Toppserien for the first time. Medkila couldn't avoid relegation in their first season in the top-flight and were back in 1. divisjon for the 2005 season.

Five years later, they were promoted for the 2011 Toppserien, but as last time, they were relegated after only one season. In 2012, they finished second in the First division, earning a playoff against Kattem for the chance to win promotion. They lost the playoff, but subsequently, Kattem withdrew their team from the league, and after Fart declined the offer to remain in Toppserien, Medkila were promoted after all. In 2013, Medkila's women survived comfortably in 9th place in the Toppserien.

Medkila also fields a men's team, which played in the Third Division (fourth tier) from 1995 to 2010 and again from 2013.

== Recent seasons ==
Season		Pos.	Pl.	W	D	L	GS	GA	P	Cup	Notes
2003	1. divisjon	↑ 2	18	13	3	2	57	27	42	Winner	Promoted to the Toppserien
2004	Toppserien	↓ 10	18	2	1	15	12	65	7	Third round	Relegated to the 1. divisjon
2005	1. divisjon	6	18	6	2	10	24	42	20	Third round	
2006	1. divisjon	5	18	8	4	6	35	25	28	Second round	
2007	1. divisjon	5	18	7	6	5	24	16	27	Quarterfinal	
2008	1. divisjon	4	18	8	4	6	22	25	28	Second round	
2009	1. divisjon	6	22	9	5	8	35	30	32	Third round	
2010	1. divisjon	↑ 2	22	14	2	6	39	18	44	Third round	Promoted to the Toppserien
2011	Toppserien	↓ 11	22	3	3	16	20	63	12	Quarterfinal	Relegated to the 1. divisjon
2012	1. divisjon	↑ 2	22	15	4	3	48	15	49	Third round	Promoted to the Toppserien
2013	Toppserien	9	22	7	5	10	27	44	26	Quarterfinal	
2014	Toppserien	10	22	4	3	15	18	62	15	Quarterfinal	
2015	Toppserien	11	22	5	2	15	28	63	17	Quarterfinal	
2016	Toppserien	11	22	2	5	15	21	50	11	Quarterfinal	
2017	Toppserien	↓ 12	22	1	2	19	9	69	5	Second round	Relegated to the 1. divisjon
2018	1. divisjon	5	22	10	4	8	29	26	34	Second round	
2019	1. divisjon	4	18	12	5	5	37	33	41	Third round	
2020	1. divisjon	2	18	12	0	6	33	21	36	First qualifying round	

== Honours ==
- Norwegian Women's Cup (1): 2003

== Current women's squad ==
As of 18 July 2016.

No.	Position	Nation	Player
1	GK	USA	Megan Kufeld
2	DF	NOR	Anja Rasmussen
4	FW	NOR	Emilie Kristiansen
5	MF	NOR	Anna Wulff Iversen
6	FW	NOR	Martine Olsen
7	DF	USA	Alexandra Jean Quincey (Captain)
8	DF	NOR	Mette Aasvik Skau
9	MF	NOR	Kristine Amundsen
11	FW	NOR	Lotte Fossem
14	MF	NOR	Maria Hustad
16	MF	NOR	Ida Marie Fossem
17	DF	NOR	Marianne Linaker
18	DF	NOR	Louise Normann
19	FW	NOR	Hedda Jakobsen
20	DF	NOR	Rebekka Hansen
21	DF	SWE	Fanny Johansson
22	DF	NOR	Sigrun Linaker Dybvik
23	DF	NOR	Silje Helen Johansen

== Recent history men ==
Season		Pos.	Pl.	W	D	L	GS	GA	P	Cup	Notes
2010	3. divisjon	↓ 7	22	9	5	8	56	41	32	Not Qualified	Relegated to the 3. divisjon
2011	4. Divisjon	3	22	14	3	5	74	43	45	Not Qualified	
2012	4. Divisjon	↑ 1	20	18	1	1	100	23	55	Not Qualified	Promoted to the 3. divisjon
2013	3. divisjon	↑ 1	22	17	4	1	71	24	55	First qualifying round	Promoted to the 2. divisjon
2014	2. divisjon	↓ 14	26	2	1	23	13	91	7	First round	Relegated to the 3. divisjon
2015	3. divisjon	10	22	4	4	14	20	52	16	First qualifying round	
2016	3. divisjon	↓ 12	22	1	2	19	21	80	5	First qualifying round	Relegated to the 4. Divisjon
2017	4. Divisjon	8	22	7	3	12	36	46	24	Second qualifying round	
2018	4. Divisjon	5	22	12	1	9	49	37	37	First qualifying round	
