= Norwegian women's football clubs in international competitions =

This is a compilation of the results of the teams representing Norway at official international women's football competitions, that is the UEFA Women's Cup and its successor, the UEFA Women's Champions League.

As of the 2016–17 edition Norway stands 12th in the UWCL's association rankings, and it is thus the last of twelve association currently awarded two spots in the competition, closely followed by Switzerland. Its major successes to date came in the UEFA Women's Cup era, with two appearances in the semifinals by Kolbotn and Trondheims-Ørn.

== Teams ==
These are the six teams that have represented Norway in the UEFA Women's Cup and the UEFA Women's Champions League.

Club	Founded	Region	Location	Appearances	First	Last	Best result
Avaldsnes	1989	Western Norway	Avaldsnes	2	2016–17	2017–18	6 / 7 - Last 32
Kolbotn	1991	Eastern Norway	Oppegård	3	2003–04	2007–08	3 / 7 - Semifinals
Lillestrøm	1989	Eastern Norway	Lillestrøm	5	2009–10	2017–18	5 / 7 - Last 16
Røa	1984	Eastern Norway	Oslo	5	2005–06	2012–13	4 / 7 - Quarterfinals
Stabæk	2008	Eastern Norway	Bærum	3	2011–12	2014–15	5 / 7 - Last 16
Trondheims-Ørn	1972	Trøndelag	Trondheim	3	2001–02	2004–05	3 / 7 - Semifinals

Location of the teams within Norway

== Historical progression ==
		2001–02	2002–03	2003–04	2004–05	2005–06	2006–07	2007–08	2008–09	2009–10
Champion										
Finalists										
Semifinalists					TRO		KOL			
Quarterfinalists		TRO	TRO	KOL	TRO		KOL			RØA
Round of 16		Not played	Not played	Not played	TRO		KOL	KOL	RØA	RØA
Round of 32		TRO	TRO	KOL		RØA			RØA	RØA
Earlier stages										LIL
	2010–11	2011–12	2012–13	2013–14	2014–15	2015–16	2016–17			
Champion										
Finalists										
Semifinalists										
Quarterfinalists										
Round of 16	RØA		RØA - STA			LIL				
Round of 32	RØA	STA	RØA - STA	LIL	STA	LIL	LIL - AVA			
Earlier stages							AVA			

== Results by team ==
=== Avaldsnes ===
2016–17 UEFA Women's Champions League
Round	Opponent	1st	2nd	Agg.	Scorers
Last 32	(France) Olympique Lyonnais	h: 2–5	a: 0–5	2–10	Hansen - Thorsnes

2017–18 UEFA Women's Champions League
Round	Opponent	1st	2nd	Agg.	Scorers
Qualifiers (group stage)	(Montenegro) Breznica	2–1			Gielnik – Thorsnes
Qualifiers (group stage)	(Israel) Kiryat Gat	6–2			Pedersen 2 – Gielnik – Paixão – Rosa – Thorsnes
Qualifiers (group stage)	(Serbia) Spartak Subotica	2–0		9 points	Logarzo – Daiane
Round of 32	(Spain) Barcelona	h: 0–4			Alves – Caldentey – Duggan – Martens

=== Kolbotn ===
2003–04 UEFA Women's Cup
Round	Opponent	1st	2nd	Agg.	Scorers
Last 16 (group stage)	(Poland) Wroclaw	15–2			S. Gulbrandsen 4 - Hansen 3 - Rønning 3 - Bøe Jensen 3 - Galvez - Wang Andersen
Last 16 (group stage)	(Republic of Ireland) University College Dublin	8–0			Lindblom 2 - Stundal 2 - Wang Andersen 2 - S. Gulbrandsen - Stensland
Last 16 (group stage)	(France) Juvisy	2–1		9 points	Bøe Jensen - S. Gulbrandsen
Quarterfinals	(Sweden) Malmö	a: 0–2	h: 1–0	1–2	Galvez

2006–07 UEFA Women's Cup
Round	Opponent	1st	2nd	Agg.	Scorers
Last 16 (group stage)	(Spain) Espanyol	4–2			Hansen 2 - S. Gulbrandsen - Schjelderup
Last 16 (group stage)	(Ukraine) Lehenda Chernihiv	2–1			Hammarø-Huse - Rønning
Last 16 (group stage)	(Sweden) Umeå	1–2		6 points	Stensland
Quarterfinals	(Germany) Frankfurt	h: 2–1	a: 2–3	4–4 (agr)	S. Gulbrandsen 3 - Herlovsen
Semifinals	(Sweden) Umeå	h: 1–5	a: 0–6	1–11	Rønning

2007–08 UEFA Women's Cup
Round	Opponent	1st	2nd	Agg.	Scorers
Last 16 (group stage)	(Czech Republic) Sparta Prague	3–1			S. Gulbrandsen 2 - Angus
Last 16 (group stage)	(France) Olympique Lyonn. (host)	0–1			
Last 16 (group stage)	(Denmark) Brøndby	0–1		3 points	

=== Lillestrøm ===
2009–10 UEFA Women's Champions League
Round	Opponent	1st	2nd	Agg.	Scorers
Qualifiers (group stage)	(Estonia) Levadia Tallinn	5–0			Dekkerhus 2 - Nwajei 2 - Abdullah
Qualifiers (group stage)	(Croatia) Osijek (host)	9–0			Dekkerhus 2 - Knudsen 2 - Nwajei 2 - E. Gulbrandsen - Matheson - Storløkken
Qualifiers (group stage)	(England) Everton	0–1		6 points	

2013–14 UEFA Women's Champions League
Round	Opponent	1st	2nd	Agg.	Scorers
Last 32	(Sweden) Malmö	h: 1–3	a: 0–5	1–8	Haavi

2015–16 UEFA Women's Champions League
Round	Opponent	1st	2nd	Agg.	Scorers
Last 32	(Switzerland) Zürich	h: 1–0	a: 1–1 (aet)	2–1	Bachor - Mykjåland
Last 16	(Germany) Frankfurt	h: 0–2	a: 2–0 (aet)	2–2 (p: 4–5)	Lund - Lundh

2016–17 UEFA Women's Champions League
Round	Opponent	1st	2nd	Agg.	Scorers
Last 32	(France) Paris Saint-Germain	h: 3–1	a: 1–4	4–5	Berget - Haavi - Mykjåland - Spord

2017–18 UEFA Women's Champions League
Round	Opponent	1st	2nd	Agg.	Scorers
Last 32	(Denmark) Brøndby	h: 0–0			

=== Røa ===
2005–06 UEFA Women's Cup
Round	Opponent	1st	2nd	Agg.	Scorers
Last 36 (group stage)	(Iceland) Valur	1–4			Stadsøy
Last 36 (group stage)	(Estonia) Pärnu	9–1			Bredland 5 - Stadsøy 3 - Fostervoll
Last 36 (group stage)	(Finland) United Jakobstad	3–2		6 points	Braavold Johansen - Nordby - Vesterbekkmo

2008–09 UEFA Women's Cup
Round	Opponent	1st	2nd	Agg.	Scorers
Qualifiers (group stage)	(Finland) Honka	2–0			
Qualifiers (group stage)	(Bulgaria) NSA Sofia	7–0		6 points	
Last 16 (group stage)	(Scotland) Glasgow City	6–1			
Last 16 (group stage)	(Germany) Frankfurt	1–3			
Last 16 (group stage)	(Russia) Zvezda Perm	1–3		3 points	

2009–10 UEFA Women's Champions League
Round	Opponent	1st	2nd	Agg.	Scorers
Last 32	(England) Everton	h: 3–0	a: 0–2	3–2	Haavi - M. Knutsen - Thorsnes
Last 16	(Russia) Zvezda Perm	h: 0–0	a: 1–1	1–1 (agr)	G. Knutsen
Quarterfinals	(Germany) Turbine Potsdam	a: 0–5	h: 0–5	0–10	

2010–11 UEFA Women's Champions League
Round	Opponent	1st	2nd	Agg.	Scorers
Last 32	(Belarus) Zorka Minsk	a: 2–1	h: 0–0	2–1	Stange - Thorsnes
Last 16	(Russia) Zvezda Perm	h: 1–1	a: 0–4	1–5	Thorsnes

2012–13 UEFA Women's Champions League
Round	Opponent	1st	2nd	Agg.	Scorers
Last 32	(Kazakhstan) Kazygurt	a: 4–0	h: 4–0	8–0	Andreassen 2 - Thorsnes 2 - Haavi - Kvaslvik - Tårnes
Last 16	(Germany) Wolfsburg	h: 1–1	a: 1–4	2–5	Haavi - Johansen

=== Stabæk ===
2011–12 UEFA Women's Champions League
Round	Opponent	1st	2nd	Agg.	Scorers
Last 32	(Germany) Frankfurt	h: 1–0	a: 1–4	2–4	Dekkerhus - Moore

2012–13 UEFA Women's Champions League
Round	Opponent	1st	2nd	Agg.	Scorers
Last 32	(Denmark) Brøndby	h: 2–0	a: 3–3	5–3	Hegerberg 2 - Stensland 2 - Kaurin
Last 16	(France) Juvisy	h: 0–0	a: 1–2	1–2	Moore

2014–15 UEFA Women's Champions League
Round	Opponent	1st	2nd	Agg.	Scorers
Last 32	(Germany) Wolfsburg	h: 0–1	a: 1–2	1–3	Wiik

=== Trondheims-Ørn ===
2001–02 UEFA Women's Cup
Round	Opponent	1st	2nd	Agg.	Scorers
Last 32 (group stage)	(Iceland) KR	9–0			Pedersen 4 - Sandaune 2 - R. Gulbrandsen - Jordanger - Lie
Last 32 (group stage)	(Belarus) Babruyshanka	6–1			Rønning 2 - Enlid 2 - R. Gulbrandsen - Lie
Last 32 (group stage)	(Belgium) Eendracht Aalst	6–0		9 points	R. Gulbrandsen 3 - Sandaune 2 - Jordanger - Lehn - Rønning
Quarterfinals	(Finland) HJK	h: 2–1	a: 0–2	2–3	Sandaune

2002–03 UEFA Women's Cup
Round	Opponent	1st	2nd	Agg.	Scorers
Last 32 (group stage)	(Netherlands) Saestum	2–0			Enlid - Rønning
Last 32 (group stage)	(Greece) PAOK (host)	12–0			Pedersen 5 - Andersen 2 - Jordanger 2 - Nordgård - Nyrønning - Rønning
Last 32 (group stage)	(Romania) Regal Bucharest	6–0		9 points	Nordgård 2 - Andersen - Rønning
Quarterfinals	(Denmark) Fortuna Hjørring	h: 2–2	a: 0–1	2–3	Pedersen - Rønning

2004–05 UEFA Women's Cup
Round	Opponent	1st	2nd	Agg.	Scorers
Last 16 (group stage)	(Kazakhstan) Alma	3–0			R. Gulbrandsen - Mørkved - Pedersen
Last 16 (group stage)	(Russia) Energiya Voronezh	1–1			Sandaune
Last 16 (group stage)	(Denmark) Brøndby (host)	2–0		7 points	Engen - R. Gulbrandsen
Quarterfinals	(Belarus) Babruyshanka	a: 4–0	h: 2–1	6–1	Engen 2 - Enlid 2 - Mørkved - Sandaune
Semifinals	(Germany) Turbine Potsdam	a: 0–4	h: 1–3	1–7	Pedersen
