= 2002 Toppserien =

Toppserien
- Season: 2002
- Champions: Kolbotn; 1st title
- Relegated: Sandviken; Byåsen
- Matches: 90
- Goals: 409 (4.54 per match)
- Top goalscorer: (Norway) Marianne Pettersen (22 goals)

The 2002 season of the Toppserien, the highest women's football (soccer) league in Norway, began on 20 April 2002 and ended on 26 October 2002.

18 games were played with 3 points given for wins and 1 for draws. Number nine and ten were relegated, while the two top teams from the First Division were promoted.

Kolbotn won the league.

== League table ==
Pos	Team	Pld	W	D	L	GF	GA	GD	Pts	Qualification or relegation
1	Kolbotn (C)	18	15	2	1	60	9	+51	47	Qualification for the UEFA Women's Cup second qualifying round
2	Asker	18	14	2	2	81	23	+58	44	
3	Trondheims-Ørn	18	12	3	3	63	21	+42	39	
4	Røa	18	9	4	5	47	32	+15	31	
5	Arna-Bjørnar	18	8	2	8	44	38	+6	26	
6	Team Strømmen	18	6	2	10	29	59	−30	20	
7	Klepp	18	5	2	11	26	45	−19	17	
8	Larvik	18	4	5	9	26	55	−29	17	
9	Sandviken (R)	18	3	4	11	20	48	−28	13	Relegation to First Division
10	Byåsen (R)	18	0	2	16	13	79	−66	2	Relegation to First Division

Source: NIFS
Rules for classification: 1) points; 2) goal difference; 3) number of goals scored.
(C) Champions; (R) Relegated

== Top goalscorers ==
- 22 goals:
  - (Norway) Marianne Pettersen, Asker
- 19 goals:
  - (Norway) Kjersti Thun, Asker
  - (Norway) Christine Bøe Jensen, Kolbotn
  - (Norway) Elene Moseby, Team Strømmen
- 13 goals:
  - (Norway) Brit Sandaune, Trondheims-Ørn
- 12 goals:
  - (Norway) Solveig Gulbrandsen, Kolbotn
- 10 goals:
  - (Norway) Ingrid Camilla Fosse Sæthre, Arna-Bjørnar
  - (Norway) Bente Musland, Arna-Bjørnar
  - (Norway) Lene Espedal, Klepp
  - (Norway) Heidi Pedersen, Trondheims-Ørn
- 9 goals:
  - (Norway) Anita Eftedal, Larvik
  - (Norway) Kristine Edner, Røa
  - (Norway) Trine Rønning, Trondheims-Ørn

== Promotion and relegation ==
- Sandviken and Byåsen were relegated to the First Division.
- Liungen and Fløya were promoted from the First Division.
