= Miriam Mumtaz =

Norwegian footballer (born 1979)

Personal information
- Date of birth: 6 June 1979 (age 47)
- Position: Striker

Youth career
- Våg
- 1989–1990: Radar
- 1991–1994: Donn

Senior career*
| Years | Team | Apps | (Gls) |
| 1995–1997 | Donn | | |
| 1997–2000 | Larvik | | |
| 2000 | HEI | | |
| 2001–2003 | Larvik | | |
| 2004–2005 | Røa | 15 | (1) |
| 2005 | → Liungen (loan) | 3 | (1) |
| 2006 | Liungen | 16 | (4) |
| 2007–2008 | Team Strømmen | 36 | (7) |
| 2009 | Kolbotn | 20 | (12) |
| 2012 | Donn | | |

International career
| 1998 | Norway U18 | 4 | (1) |
- * Club domestic league appearances and goals

Miriam Mumtaz (born 6 June 1979) is a Norwegian footballer who played as a striker. She won the double with Røa and finished in the top 10 on the top goalscorer table with Kolbotn.

== Career ==
She was born to a Norwegian mother and Pakistani father. She grew up in Vågsbygd and started her youth career in FK Våg. She played with boys initially, moving on to Radar at the age of ten and FK Donn at the age of 12. She made her senior debut in a friendly match in 1994, but under league rules, she was too young to play official matches.

Mumtaz was a regular player for Donn's first team from 1995. After the 1996 season, when Donn failed to win promotion, Mumtaz wanted to leave for a bigger club. She received offers from Klepp and Verdal; the latter club also tried to sign the erstwhile Donn player Line Anzjøn.

Mumtaz remained in Donn until the fall of 1997, when she traveled up the coast to join FK Larvik. She would attend her last year of secondary school at Thor Heyerdahl. She scored on her debut for FK Larvik. She also featured for Norway U18 in 1998, gaining 4 caps and scoring 1 goal, against Sweden U18.

For the year 2000–01, Mumtaz applied for a teachers' college in Denmark. She would play for HEI, but already in November 2000 her return to Larvik was announced. She scored important goals as Larvik were newly promoted to the 2002 Toppserien, when the team avoided relegation. They were relegated in 2003. In 2004 Mumtaz joined Røa IL.

She helped Røa win the first championship in club history, the 2004 Toppserien. Though she was an unused substitute in the final, Mumtaz also won the 2004 cup with Røa.

In August 2005 she went on loan to league strugglers IF Liungen, scoring on her debut. The move was made permanent in 2006, but the season ended in relegation from the Toppserien. Mumtaz was approached by Amazon Grimstad, but chose to continue her career in Team Strømmen. She was an unused substitute in the 2008 cup final, which Team Strømmen lost to her former club Røa.

Mumtaz moved on to Kolbotn in 2009. Aged 29, she was among their most experienced players and felt a responsibility for the younger teammates on and off the field. She was particularly noted for scoring 4 goals against Fortuna Ålesund in a 8–1 thrashing. Nonetheless, she chose to retire after the 2009 season. In her last elite match, she scored the decisive goal in a victory over Amazon Grimstad. In the 2009 Toppserien, Mumtaz ended 9th in the top goalscorer table with 12 goals.

She made a brief comeback for FK Donn in 2012. (Note: Miriam Mumtaz at the Norwegian Football Federation (in Norwegian)) Mumtaz later served as a board member of IK Start's women's team.

== Personal life ==
Mumtaz started a gym and a crossfit facility in Vågsbygd, later starting and co-owning the gym Urban Fitness. She settled in Lund, Kristiansand, with Monica Kleppe.
