= 2001 Toppserien =

Toppserien
- Season: 2001
- Champions: Trondheims-Ørn; 6th title
- Relegated: Liungen; Athene Moss
- Matches: 90
- Goals: 379 (4.21 per match)
- Top goalscorer: (Norway) Ragnhild Gulbrandsen (31 goals)

The 2001 season of the Toppserien, the highest women's football (soccer) league in Norway, began on 21 April 2001 and ended on 27 October 2001.

18 games were played with 3 points given for wins and 1 for draws. Number nine and ten were relegated, while the two top teams from the First Division were promoted.

Trondheims-Ørn won the league.

== League table ==
Pos	Team	Pld	W	D	L	GF	GA	GD	Pts	Qualification or relegation
1	Trondheims-Ørn (C)	18	17	1	0	90	13	+77	52	Qualification for the UEFA Women's Cup second qualifying round
2	Kolbotn	18	15	0	3	55	20	+35	45	
3	Arna-Bjørnar	18	13	2	3	41	27	+14	41	
4	Asker	18	11	2	5	59	26	+33	35	
5	Klepp	18	8	2	8	32	38	−6	26	
6	Team Strømmen	18	6	0	12	31	50	−19	18	
7	Røa	18	3	3	12	18	51	−33	12	
8	Byåsen	18	3	3	12	15	64	−49	12	
9	Liungen (R)	18	2	4	12	25	57	−32	10	Relegation to First Division
10	Athene Moss (R)	18	1	5	12	13	33	−20	8	Relegation to First Division

Source: NIFS
Rules for classification: 1) points; 2) goal difference; 3) number of goals scored.
(C) Champions; (R) Relegated

== Top goalscorers ==
- 31 goals:
  - (Norway) Ragnhild Gulbrandsen, Trondheims/Ørn
- 19 goals:
  - (Norway) Elene Moseby, Team Strømmen
- 18 goals:
  - (Norway) Solveig Gulbrandsen, Kolbotn
- 15 goals:
  - (Norway) Ingunn Sørum, Liungen
- 14 goals:
  - (Norway) Brit Sandaune, Trondheims-Ørn
- 13 goals:
  - (Norway) Ellinor Grønfur, Klepp
  - (Norway) Linda Ørmen, Kolbotn
- 11 goals:
  - (Norway) Bente Musland, Arna-Bjørnar
  - (Norway) Kjersti Thun, Asker
- 10 goals:
  - (Norway) Kristin Stundal, Asker
  - (Norway) Trine Rønning, Trondheims-Ørn
  - (Norway) Heidi Pedersen, Trondheims-Ørn
- 9 goals:
  - (Norway) Ingrid Camilla Fosse Sæthre, Arna-Bjørnar
  - (Norway) Marit Jordanger, Trondheims-Ørn

== Promotion and relegation ==
- Liungen and Athene Moss were relegated to the First Division.
- Sandviken and Larvik were promoted from the First Division.
