= 2000 Toppserien =

- Season: 2000
- Teams: 10
- Champions: Trondheims-Ørn; 5th title
- Relegated: Larvik; Grand Bodø
- Matches: 90
- Goals: 381 (4.23 per match)
- Top goalscorer: Kjersti Thun; Ragnhild Gulbrandsen (24 goals)

The 2000 season of the Toppserien, the highest women's football (soccer) league in Norway, began on 29 April 2000 and ended on 21 October 2000.

18 games were played with 3 points given for wins and 1 for draws. Number nine and ten were relegated, while the two top teams from the 1. divisjon were promoted.

Trondheims-Ørn won the league.

== League table ==
Pos	Team	Pld	W	D	L	GF	GA	GD	Pts	Qualification or relegation
1	Trondheims-Ørn (C)	18	16	0	2	62	14	+48	48	Qualification for the UEFA Women's Cup second qualifying round
2	Asker	18	15	2	1	64	20	+44	47	
3	Kolbotn	18	11	2	5	47	27	+20	35	
4	Bjørnar	18	9	3	6	52	30	+22	30	
5	Athene Moss	18	9	3	6	48	29	+19	30	
6	Klepp	18	8	1	9	27	26	+1	25	
7	Byåsen	18	4	1	13	17	47	−30	13	
8	Setskog/Høland	18	4	0	14	27	78	−51	12	
9	Larvik (R)	18	3	2	13	19	55	−36	11	Relegation to First Division
10	Grand Bodø (R)	18	3	2	13	18	55	−37	11	Relegation to First Division

Source: NIFS
Rules for classification: 1) points; 2) goal difference; 3) number of goals scored.
(C) Champions; (R) Relegated

== Top goalscorers ==
- 24 goals:
  - (Norway) Kjersti Thun, Asker
  - (Norway) Ragnhild Gulbrandsen, Trondheims/Ørn
- 20 goals:
  - (Norway) Marianne Pettersen, Athene Moss
- 15 goals:
  - (Norway) Bente Musland, Bjørnar
- 13 goals:
  - (Norway) Ingrid Camilla Fosse Sæthre, Bjørnar
  - (Norway) Ellinor Grønfur, Klepp
  - (Norway) Ann Kristin Aarønes, Trondheims-Ørn
- 12 goals:
  - (Norway) Margunn Haugenes, Bjørnar
  - (Norway) Linda Ørmen, Kolbotn
  - (Norway) Ann Elisabeth Kallevik, Setskog/Høland
- 11 goals:
  - (Norway) Linda Medalen, Asker
  - (Norway) Tonje Hansen, Kolbotn
- 10 goals:
  - (Norway) Anita Rapp, Asker

== Promotion and relegation ==
- Larvik and Grand Bodø were relegated to the 1. divisjon.
- Røa and Liungen were promoted from the 1. divisjon.
