= 2003 Toppserien =

Norwegian women's football league season

Toppserien
- Season: 2003
- Champions: Trondheims-Ørn; 7th title
- Relegated: FK Larvik; Liungen
- Matches: 90
- Goals: 368 (4.09 per match)
- Top goalscorer: Bente Musland; Solveig Gulbrandsen; Marianne Pettersen (15 goals each)

The 2003 season of the Toppserien, the highest women's football (soccer) league in Norway, began on 16 April 2003 and ended on 2 November 2003.

18 games were played with 3 points given for wins and 1 for draws. Number nine and ten were relegated, while the two top teams from the First Division were promoted.

Trondheims-Ørn won the league.

== League table ==
Pos	Team	Pld	W	D	L	GF	GA	GD	Pts	Qualification or relegation
1	Trondheims-Ørn (C)	18	15	2	1	53	7	+46	47	Qualification for the UEFA Women's Cup second qualifying round
2	Kolbotn	18	13	0	5	63	28	+35	39	
3	Asker	18	12	3	3	54	20	+34	39	
4	Røa	18	7	6	5	23	27	−4	27	
5	Fløya	18	8	1	9	28	40	−12	25	
6	Arna-Bjørnar	18	6	4	8	43	48	−5	22	
7	Team Strømmen	18	6	2	10	33	47	−14	20	
8	Klepp	18	3	8	7	25	36	−11	17	
9	Liungen (R)	18	5	2	11	32	45	−13	17	Relegation to First Division
10	Larvik (R)	18	0	2	16	14	70	−56	2	Relegation to First Division

Source: NIFS
Rules for classification: 1) points; 2) goal difference; 3) number of goals scored.
(C) Champions; (R) Relegated

== Top goalscorers ==
- 15 goals:
  - (Norway) Bente Musland, Arna-Bjørnar
  - (Norway) Marianne Pettersen, Asker
  - (Norway) Solveig Gulbrandsen, Kolbotn
- 12 goals:
  - (Norway) Tonje Hansen, Kolbotn
  - (Norway) Ingunn Sørum, Liungen
- 11 goals:
  - (Norway) Elene Moseby, Team Strømmen
  - (Norway) Heidi Pedersen, Trondheims-Ørn
- 9 goals:
  - (Norway) Ingrid Camilla Fosse Sæthre, Arna-Bjørnar
  - (Norway) Kjersti Thun, Asker
  - (Norway) Christine Bøe Jensen, Kolbotn
- 8 goals:
  - (Norway) Veronica Stefanussen, Fløya
  - (Norway) Lene Espedal, Klepp
  - (Norway) Brit Sandaune, Trondheims-Ørn

== Promotion and relegation ==
- Liungen and Larvik were relegated to the First Division
- Sandviken and Medkila were promoted from the First Division.
