= Trine Rønning =

Norwegian footballer (born 1982)

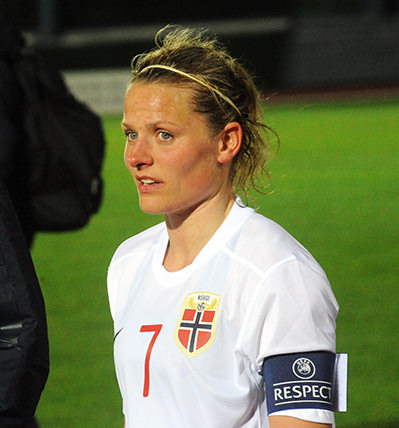
- Rønning at the 2015 Algarve Cup

Personal information
- Full name: Trine Bjerke Rønning
- Date of birth: 14 June 1982 (age 44)
- Place of birth: Trondheim, Norway
- Height: 1.64 m (5 ft 4 1/2 in)
- Positions: Defender; midfielder

Youth career
- Kolstad IL
- Trond IL

Senior career*
Years	Team	Apps	(Gls)
1998–2002	Trondheims-Ørn	84	(39)
2003–2008	Kolbotn	99	(44)
2009–2017	Stabæk	168	(26)

International career^{‡}
1999–2016	Norway	162	(22)
Medal record
Women's football
Representing Norway
UEFA Women's Championship
Silver medal – second place	2005 England	Team
Silver medal – second place	2013 Sweden	Team
- * Club domestic league appearances and goals as of 09:22, 5 November 2017 (UTC) ‡ National team caps and goals as of 21:37, 09 March 2016 (UTC)

Trine Bjerke Rønning (born 14 June 1982) is a former Norwegian footballer. She has previously played for Trondheims-Ørn and Kolbotn. Since making her Norway women's national football team debut in October 1999, she has won over 150 caps. Rønning represented her country at the 2005, 2009 and 2013 editions of the UEFA Women's Championship, after being a non-playing squad member in 2001. She also played at the 2003, 2007, 2011 and 2015 FIFA Women's World Cups, as well as at the 2008 Olympic football tournament. In February 2015 she was appointed captain of the national team.

== Club career ==
Rønning has won the Norwegian elite Toppserien league six times with three different clubs. First with Trondheims-Ørn SK in 2000 and in 2001, then with Kolbotn in 2005 and in 2006 and again with Stabæk FK in 2010 and 2013. She won the national Norwegian Women's Cup in 1998 (as a 16-year-old), 1999, 2001 and 2002 with Trondheims-Ørn, as the captain of Kolbotn in 2007 and with Stabæk in 2011, 2012 and 2013. In five seasons with Trondheims-Ørn, Rønning scored 40 league goals in 86 appearances. After captaining Kolbotn through the 2007 and 2008 seasons Rønning declined a contract extension and joined the newly formed team Stabæk FK in early 2009. After the 2017 season Rønning decided to retire.

== International career ==
Rønning made her debut on the Norway women's national football team in October 1999, a 4–0 win over Portugal. In 2001 with Norway's youth team she won silver in second place in the UEFA Women's Under-19 Championship. In her early appearances with the national team Rønning played in nearly every position except goalkeeper. She eventually found a settled place in the team at centre back.

She played for the Norway team that won silver at the UEFA Women's Euro 2005 in England, and finished fourth at the 2007 FIFA Women's World Cup in China. Norway also reached the quarter-finals of the Beijing Olympics in 2008 with Rønning as a leading member of the squad. On 4 September 2009 Rønning overcame a knee injury to play her 100th game for Norway in their 3–1 quarter-final win over arch-rivals Sweden in the UEFA Women's Euro 2009. In the same year she became vice captain.

Veteran national coach Even Pellerud selected Rønning in Norway's squad for UEFA Women's Euro 2013 in Sweden. In the final at Friends Arena, she had a first-half penalty kick saved by Germany's goalkeeper Nadine Angerer. Anja Mittag's goal gave the Germans their sixth successive title.

In February 2015 Rønning was named national team captain, as a replacement for the injured Ingvild Stensland. She scored the team's first goal at the 2015 FIFA Women's World Cup, a free-kick in Norway's 4–0 win over Thailand.

== Personal life ==
Rønning's brother Thomas Rønning is also a footballer who formerly played for Bodø/Glimt in the Tippeligaen. In January 2009, Rønning married national team-mate Kristin Blystad-Bjerke, shortly after same-sex marriage in Norway was made legal.

== Career statistics ==
Statistics accurate as of match played 4 November 2017

Club	Season	Division	League		Cup		Total	
Club	Season	Division	Apps	Goals	Apps	Goals	Apps	Goals
1998	Trondheims-Ørn	Toppserien	15	4	0	0	15	4
1999	Trondheims-Ørn	Toppserien	17	10	3	2	20	12
2000	Trondheims-Ørn	Toppserien	17	6	4	0	21	6
2001	Trondheims-Ørn	Toppserien	18	10	1	1	19	11
2002	Trondheims-Ørn	Toppserien	17	9	5	6	22	15
2003	Kolbotn	Toppserien	14	4	5	2	19	6
2004	Kolbotn	Toppserien	17	4	4	1	21	5
2005	Kolbotn	Toppserien	17	11	4	3	21	14
2006	Kolbotn	Toppserien	17	11	0	0	17	11
2007	Kolbotn	Toppserien	20	8	0	0	20	8
2008	Kolbotn	Toppserien	14	6	1	0	15	6
2009	Stabæk	Toppserien	14	6	0	0	14	6
2010	Stabæk	Toppserien	21	0	0	0	21	0
2011	Stabæk	Toppserien	17	1	3	2	20	3
2012	Stabæk	Toppserien	15	1	4	1	19	2
2013	Stabæk	Toppserien	20	5	5	2	25	7
2014	Stabæk	Toppserien	21	6	3	0	24	6
2015	Stabæk	Toppserien	21	2	3	3	24	5
2016	Stabæk	Toppserien	19	3	3	2	22	5
2017	Stabæk	Toppserien	20	2	1	0	21	2
Career Total			351	109	49	19	400	128

== International goals ==
No.	Date	Venue	Opponent	Score	Result	Competition
1.	18 January 2006	Guangzhou, China	United States	1–2	1–3	2006 Four Nations Tournament
2.	24 October 2009	Bærum, Norway	Netherlands	1–0	3–0	2011 FIFA Women's World Cup qualification
3.	27 March 2010	Hønefoss, Norway	North Macedonia	2–0	14–0	2011 FIFA Women's World Cup qualification
4.	21 August 2010	Senec, Slovakia	Slovakia	1–0	4–0	2011 FIFA Women's World Cup qualification
5.	25 August 2010	Prilep, North Macedonia	North Macedonia	7–0	7–0	2011 FIFA Women's World Cup qualification
6.	7 June 2015	Ottawa, Canada	Thailand	1–0	4–0	2015 FIFA Women's World Cup

== See also ==
- List of women's footballers with 100 or more international caps
