= Isabell Herlovsen =

Norwegian footballer (born 1988)

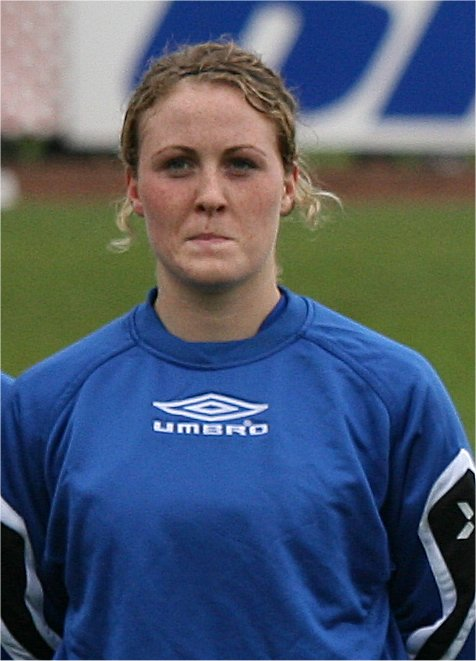
- Isabell Herlovsen in October 2007

Personal information
- Full name: Isabell Lehn Herlovsen
- Date of birth: 23 June 1988 (age 38)
- Place of birth: Mönchengladbach, West Germany
- Height: 1.70 m (5 ft 7 in)
- Position: Striker

Youth career
- 2000–2004: Kolbotn

Senior career*
| Years | Team | Apps | (Gls) |
| 2004–2009 | Kolbotn | 95 | (48) |
| 2009–2010 | Olympique Lyon | 13 | (3) |
| 2011–2017 | LSK Kvinner | 108 | (100) |
| 2017 | Jiangsu Suning | | |
| 2018–2020 | Vålerenga | 19 | (6) |
| 2019 | → Kolbotn (loan) | 17 | (8) |
| 2021 | Fredrikstad | 2 | (3) |

International career^{‡}
| 2003–2004 | Norway U17 | 12 | (1) |
| 2004–2007 | Norway U19 | 13 | (3) |
| 2008 | Norway U20 | 4 | (2) |
| 2006 | Norway U21 | 2 | (0) |
| 2007 | Norway U23 | 2 | (0) |
| 2005–2019 | Norway | 133 | (67) |
- * Club domestic league appearances and goals as of 15 November 2021 ‡ National team caps and goals as of 8 October 2019

Isabell Lehn Herlovsen (born 23 June 1988) is a Norwegian former football player.

She last played for Våleranga and Kolbotn after moving home from China and the club Jiangsu Suning. She plays as a midfielder and a striker.

Herlovsen is the daughter of former football player Kai Erik Herlovsen and was born in Germany during his spell at Borussia Mönchengladbach. She is a Norwegian women's international having made her debut at the age of 16. Herlovsen was the youngest player at UEFA Women's Euro 2005 and became the youngest goal-scorer in the tournament's history on 9 June 2005 when she scored a goal in a 1–1 draw against France.

== Club career ==
Herlovsen began her career at Kolbotn IL. She made her debut with the club in 2004 and played for five seasons winning two league titles in 2005 and 2006 and winning the women's national cup in 2007. Following the UEFA Women's Euro 2005, Herlovsen drew interest from the women's section of English club Arsenal. The two sides met for negotiations, but were unable to reach an agreement. Later on, Herlovsen scored for her club Kolbotn in the 2007 edition of the women's Norwegian Cup. The players received their championship medals from the King of Norway.

On 28 October 2009, Herlovsen's parent club Kolbotn announced that the player, alongside club and national team teammate Christine Colombo Nilsen, would be joining Olympique Lyonnais of the Division 1 Féminine. She made her debut for the club on 8 November 2009 coming on as a substitute in a 6–1 victory over Juvisy. Herlovsen scored her first goal for the club on 7 March 2010 scoring a brace in a 9–0 victory over Muret in the Challenge de France. She later featured in the final match of the UEFA Women's Champions League in 2010.

In February 2017, Herlovsen signed a contract with the Chinese club Jiangsu Suning, at the same time taking a break from playing for the Norwegian national team. In her Chinese debut match she scored a goal.

In 2018, Herlovsen returned to Norway to join Våleranga, then she was loaned out to her former club Kolbotn in 2019. In 2020, she and her club Våleranga agreed to terminate her contract.

She made a brief comeback in 2021 for Fredrikstad FK, to secure promotion to the Second Division.

== International career ==
Herlovsen had her first appearance for the Norwegian national team at the age of 16. In her first major tournament, Herlovsen was the youngest player at the competition. She scored two goals; one against France in the group stage and another against Sweden in the semi-finals. Norway won the match 3–2, but lost 3–1 in the final to Germany.

At the 2007 FIFA Women's World Cup in China, Herlovsen scored one goal in the group stage against Ghana. In the quarter-finals she scored the game-winning goal in Norway's 1–0 victory over the hosts, thus eliminating China from the tournament, in front of 50,000 spectators. In the semi-finals, Norway again lost to Germany. On 9 June 2008, Herlovsen was named to the national team squad to play in the women's tournament at the 2008 Summer Olympics.

In August 2009, Herlovsen was selected for the Norway team that had qualified for the UEFA Women's Euro 2009 in Finland. With a steady place in the team for the first time, as a striker, she played all matches and won praise for her energetic and accurate play even at times as the team's single front runner. Norway beat Sweden unexpectedly in the quarter finals only to lose to the champions Germany in the semifinal in which Herlovsen scored Norway's only goal.

== Personal life ==
Herlovsen's home is in Fredrikstad. Her father is Kai Erik Herlovsen, a former Norwegian international footballer who also played professionally in Germany for Borussia Mönchengladbach. Isabell has an older sister and a younger brother. In July 2011, Herlovsen came out as a lesbian, having been out to friends and family while in her teens. She has a son with her partner Christine Porsmyr Olsen.

== Career statistics ==
As of 4 October 2019

| Club | Season | Division | League | | Cup | | Continental | | Total | |
| Club | Season | Division | Apps | Goals | Apps | Goals | Apps | Goals | Apps | Goals |
|---|---|---|---|---|---|---|---|---|---|---|
| Kolbotn | 2004 | Toppserien | 10 | 6 | 3 | 4 | - | | 13 | 10 |
| Kolbotn | 2005 | Toppserien | 18 | 13 | 4 | 2 | - | | 22 | 15 |
| Kolbotn | 2006 | Toppserien | 13 | 4 | 0 | 0 | - | | 13 | 4 |
| Kolbotn | 2007 | Toppserien | 19 | 5 | 0 | 0 | - | | 19 | 5 |
| Kolbotn | 2008 | Toppserien | 21 | 7 | 0 | 0 | - | | 21 | 7 |
| Kolbotn | 2009 | Toppserien | 14 | 13 | 0 | 0 | - | | 14 | 13 |
| Kolbotn | Total | | 95 | 48 | 7 | 6 | - | - | 102 | 54 |
| Lyon | 2009–10 | Division 1 Féminine | 9 | 0 | 0 | 0 | 5 | 0 | 14 | 0 |
| Lyon | 2010–11 | Division 1 Féminine | 4 | 3 | 0 | 0 | 2 | 0 | 6 | 3 |
| Lyon | Total | | 13 | 3 | 0 | 0 | 7 | 0 | 20 | 3 |
| LSK Kvinner | 2011 | Toppserien | 16 | 6 | 1 | 1 | - | | 17 | 7 |
| LSK Kvinner | 2012 | Toppserien | 22 | 25 | 2 | 0 | - | | 24 | 25 |
| LSK Kvinner | 2013 | Toppserien | 17 | 5 | 1 | 1 | 2 | 0 | 20 | 6 |
| LSK Kvinner | 2014 | Toppserien | 20 | 15 | 4 | 7 | - | | 24 | 22 |
| LSK Kvinner | 2015 | Toppserien | 12 | 19 | 3 | 3 | 2 | 0 | 17 | 22 |
| LSK Kvinner | 2016 | Toppserien | 21 | 30 | 4 | 4 | 2 | 0 | 27 | 34 |
| LSK Kvinner | Total | | 108 | 100 | 15 | 16 | 6 | 0 | 129 | 116 |
| Vålerenga | 2018 | Toppserien | 19 | 6 | 3 | 6 | - | | 22 | 12 |
| Vålerenga | Total | | 19 | 6 | 3 | 6 | - | - | 22 | 12 |
| Kolbotn (loan) | 2019 | Toppserien | 17 | 8 | 1 | 5 | - | | 18 | 13 |
| Kolbotn (loan) | Total | | 17 | 8 | 1 | 5 | - | - | 18 | 13 |
| Career total | | | 252 | 165 | 26 | 33 | 13 | 0 | 291 | 198 |

=== International goals ===
Key (expand for notes on "international goals" and sorting)
| Location | Geographic location of the venue where the competition occurred Sorted by country name first, then by city name |
| Lineup | Start – played entire match on minute (off player) – substituted on at the minute indicated, and player was substituted off at the same time off minute (on player) – substituted off at the minute indicated, and player was substituted on at the same time (c) – captain Sorted by minutes played |
| Min | The minute in the match the goal was scored. For list that include caps, blank indicates played in the match but did not score a goal. |
| Assist/pass | The ball was passed by the player, which assisted in scoring the goal. This column depends on the availability and source of this information. |
| penalty or pk | Goal scored on penalty-kick which was awarded due to foul by opponent. (Goals scored in penalty-shoot-out, at the end of a tied match after extra-time, are not included.) |
| Score | The match score after the goal was scored. Sorted by goal difference, then by goal scored by the player's team |
| Result | The final score. Sorted by goal difference in the match, then by goal difference in penalty-shoot-out if it is taken, followed by goal scored by the player's team in the match, then by goal scored in the penalty-shoot-out. For matches with identical final scores, match ending in extra-time without penalty-shoot-out is a tougher match, therefore precede matches that ended in regulation |
| aet | The score at the end of extra-time; the match was tied at the end of 90' regulation |
| pso | Penalty-shoot-out score shown in parentheses; the match was tied at the end of extra-time |
| | Yellow background color – match at an invitational tournament |
| | Red background color – Olympic women's football qualification match |
NOTE: some keys may not apply for a particular football player

| Goal | Date | Location | Opponent | Score | Result | Competition |
|---|---|---|---|---|---|---|
| 1. | 9 June 2005 | Halliwell Jones Stadium, Warrington, England | France | 1–1 | 1–1 | 2005 UEFA Women's Championship |
| 2. | 16 June 2005 | Halliwell Jones Stadium, Warrington, England | Sweden | 2–1 | 3–2 | 2005 UEFA Women's Championship |
| 3. | 20 September 2007 | Yellow Dragon Stadium, Hangzhou, China | Ghana | 4–0 | 7–2 | 2007 FIFA Women's World Cup |
| 4. | 23 September 2007 | Wuhan Stadium, Wuhan, China | China | 1–0 | 1–0 | 2007 FIFA Women's World Cup |
| 5. | 25 June 2008 | City Stadium, Kutno, Poland | Poland | 3–0 | 3–0 | UEFA Women's Euro 2009 qualifying |
| 6. | 19 August 2009 | Enavallen, Enköping, Sweden | Sweden | 1–0 | 1–0 | Friendly |
| 7. | 29 October 2009 | Nadderud stadion, Bærum, Norway | Netherlands | 3–0 | 3–0 | 2011 FIFA Women's World Cup qualification (UEFA) |
| 8. | 26 February 2010 | José Arcanjo Stadium, Olhão, Portugal | United States | 1–1 | 1–2 | 2010 Algarve Cup |
| 9. | 27 March 2010 | AKA Arena, Hønefoss, Norway | North Macedonia | 1–0 | 14–0 | 2011 FIFA Women's World Cup qualification (UEFA) |
| 10. | 27 March 2010 | AKA Arena, Hønefoss, Norway | North Macedonia | 3–0 | 14–0 | 2011 FIFA Women's World Cup qualification (UEFA) |
| 11. | 27 March 2010 | AKA Arena, Hønefoss, Norway | North Macedonia | 4–0 | 14–0 | 2011 FIFA Women's World Cup qualification (UEFA) |
| 12. | 27 March 2010 | AKA Arena, Hønefoss, Norway | North Macedonia | 8–0 | 14–0 | 2011 FIFA Women's World Cup qualification (UEFA) |
| 13. | 27 March 2010 | AKA Arena, Hønefoss, Norway | North Macedonia | 10–0 | 14–0 | 2011 FIFA Women's World Cup qualification (UEFA) |
| 14. | 27 March 2010 | AKA Arena, Hønefoss, Norway | North Macedonia | 12–0 | 14–0 | 2011 FIFA Women's World Cup qualification (UEFA) |
| 15. | 30 March 2010 | Neman Stadium, Grodno, Belarus | Belarus | 3–0 | 5–0 | 2011 FIFA Women's World Cup qualification (UEFA) |
| 16. | 19 June 2010 | Oosterenkstadion, Zwolle, Netherlands | Netherlands | 1–1 | 2–2 | 2011 FIFA Women's World Cup qualification (UEFA) |
| 17. | 26 October 2010 | Falkenburg, Sweden | Sweden | 2–1 | 3–1 | Friendly |
| 18. | 21 September 2011 | Nadderud Stadion, Nadderud, Norway | Hungary | 2–0 | 6–0 | UEFA Women's Euro 2013 qualifying |
| 19. | 21 September 2011 | Nadderud Stadion, Nadderud, Norway | Hungary | 3–0 | 6–0 | UEFA Women's Euro 2013 qualifying |
| 20. | 19 November 2011 | Mourneview Park, Lurgan, Northern Ireland | Northern Ireland | 1–2 | 1–3 | UEFA Women's Euro 2013 qualifying |
| 21. | 29 February 2012 | Estádio Municipal, Parchal, Portugal | Japan | 1–0 | 1–2 | 2012 Algarve Cup |
| 22. | 16 June 2012 | Sarpsborg Stadion, Sarpsborg, Norway | Bulgaria | 1–0 | 11–0 | UEFA Women's Euro 2013 qualifying |
| 23. | 16 June 2012 | Sarpsborg Stadion, Sarpsborg, Norway | Bulgaria | 2–0 | 11–0 | UEFA Women's Euro 2013 qualifying |
| 24. | 16 June 2012 | Sarpsborg Stadion, Sarpsborg, Norway | Bulgaria | 4–0 | 11–0 | UEFA Women's Euro 2013 qualifying |
| 25. | 16 June 2012 | Sarpsborg Stadion, Sarpsborg, Norway | Bulgaria | 6–0 | 11–0 | UEFA Women's Euro 2013 qualifying |
| 26. | 16 June 2012 | Sarpsborg Stadion, Sarpsborg, Norway | Bulgaria | 7–0 | 11–0 | UEFA Women's Euro 2013 qualifying |
| 27. | 30 August 2012 | East End Park, Edinburgh, Scotland | Scotland | 1–1 | 2–2 | Friendly |
| 28. | 30 August 2012 | East End Park, Edinburgh, Scotland | Scotland | 2–1 | 2–2 | Friendly |
| 29. | 15 September 2012 | Ullevaal Stadion, Oslo, Norway | Belgium | 2–0 | 3–2 | UEFA Women's Euro 2013 qualifying |
| 30. | 7 May 2014 | Tønsberg Gressbane, Tønsberg, Norway | Portugal | 2–0 | 2–0 | 2015 FIFA Women's World Cup qualification (UEFA) |
| 31. | 14 June 2014 | Brann Stadion, Bergen, Norway | Greece | 5–0 | 6–0 | 2015 FIFA Women's World Cup qualification (UEFA) |
| 32. | 18 June 2014 | Estádio Marcolino de Castro, Santa Maria da Feira, Portugal | Portugal | 1–0 | 2–0 | 2015 FIFA Women's World Cup qualification (UEFA) |
| 33. | 13 September 2014 | Niko Dovana Stadium, Durrës, Albania | Albania | 1–0 | 11–0 | 2015 FIFA Women's World Cup qualification (UEFA) |
| 34. | 13 September 2014 | Niko Dovana Stadium, Durrës, Albania | Albania | 4–0 | 11–0 | 2015 FIFA Women's World Cup qualification (UEFA) |
| 35. | 13 September 2014 | Niko Dovana Stadium, Durrës, Albania | Albania | 8–0 | 11–0 | 2015 FIFA Women's World Cup qualification (UEFA) |
| 36. | 25 November 2014 | Randaberg Stadion, Randaberg, Norway | New Zealand | 1–1 | 1–1 | Friendly |
| 37. | 13 January 2015 | La Manga, Spain | Sweden | 1–0 | 2–3 | Friendly |
| 38. | 13 January 2015 | La Manga, Spain | Sweden | 2–0 | 2–3 | Friendly |
| 39. | 9 March 2015 | Estádio Municipal, Albufeira, Portugal | Switzerland | 2–2 | 2–2 | 2015 Algarve Cup |
| 56. | 1 March 2019 | Albufeira Municipal, Albufeira, Portugal | China | 1–0 | 3–1 | 2019 Algarve Cup |
| 57. | 6 March 2019 | Bela Vista Municipal, Parchal, Portugal | Poland | 1–0 | 3–0 | 2019 Algarve Cup |
| 58. | 2 June 2019 | Stade Moulonguet, Amiens, France | South Africa | 4–0 | 7–2 | Friendly |
| 59. | 2 June 2019 | Stade Moulonguet, Amiens, France | South Africa | 5–0 | 7–2 | Friendly |
| 60. | 2 June 2019 | Stade Moulonguet, Amiens, France | South Africa | 6–1 | 7–2 | Friendly |
| 61. | 17 June 2019 | Stade Auguste-Delaune, Reims, France | South Korea | 2–0 | 2–1 | 2019 FIFA Women's World Cup |
| 62. | 22 June 2019 | Allianz Riviera, Nice, France | Australia | 1–0 | 1–1 | 2019 FIFA Women's World Cup |
| 63. | 4 October 2019 | Borisov Arena, Barysaw, Belarus | Belarus | 1–0 | 7–1 | UEFA Women's Euro 2021 qualifying |
| 64. | 4 October 2019 | Borisov Arena, Barysaw, Belarus | Belarus | 2–0 | 7–1 | UEFA Women's Euro 2021 qualifying |
| 65. | 8 October 2019 | Tórsvøllur, Tórshavn, Faroe Islands | Faroe Islands | 6–0 | 13–0 | UEFA Women's Euro 2021 qualifying |
| 66. | 8 October 2019 | Tórsvøllur, Tórshavn, Faroe Islands | Faroe Islands | 10–0 | 13–0 | UEFA Women's Euro 2021 qualifying |
| 67. | 8 October 2019 | Tórsvøllur, Tórshavn, Faroe Islands | Faroe Islands | 12–0 | 13–0 | UEFA Women's Euro 2021 qualifying |

== Honours ==
=== Club ===
Kolbotn

- Toppserien: 2005, 2006
- Norwegian Cup: 2007

Lyon

- Division 1 Féminine: 2009–10
- Champions League runners-up: 2010

LSK Kvinner

- Toppserien: 2012, 2014, 2015, 2016
- Norwegian Cup: 2014, 2015, 2016

Jiangsu Suning

- Chinese Women's FA Cup: 2017

=== Individual ===
- Top Scorer, Toppserien: 2012 (25 goals), 2016 (30 goals)

== See also ==
- List of women's footballers with 100 or more international caps
