= Ciara McCormack =

Association football player (born 1979)

Personal information
- Full name: Ciara Marie McCormack
- Date of birth: 29 September 1979 (age 47)
- Place of birth: North Vancouver, British Columbia, Canada
- Height: 5 ft 7 in (1.70 m)
- Position: Defender

College career
Years	Team	Apps	(Gls)
1997–2000	Yale Bulldogs		
2001	Connecticut Huskies		

Senior career*
Years	Team	Apps	(Gls)
2001	Boston Renegades		
2002	Vancouver Whitecaps Women		
2002–2004	Fortuna Hjørring		
2005–2006	Vancouver Whitecaps Women	15	(0)
2007–2008	Ottawa Fury Women	18	(2)
2008	Asker	1	(0)
2008	Larvik	5	(0)
2009–2010	Kolbotn	7	(0)
2010	Donn	4	(0)
2011	Vancouver Whitecaps Women	3	(0)
2012	New England Mutiny	3	(0)
2013–2014	Newcastle Jets	7	(0)
2023	Treaty United	0	(0)

International career
2008–2010	Republic of Ireland	8	(0)
- * Club domestic league appearances and goals

Ciara Marie McCormack (born 29 September 1979) is a former football player who played as a defender. Born in Canada, she made eight appearances for the Republic of Ireland national team. She was previously the co-owner and CEO of Limerick based club, Treaty United.

== College career ==
McCormack won a scholarship to Yale University and played college soccer for four years. She spent a further year at the University of Connecticut.

== Club career ==
McCormack has featured for Boston Renegades, Vancouver Whitecaps Women and Ottawa Fury Women in the W-League. She also played for Fortuna Hjørring in Denmark and was the first North American to play in a UEFA Champions League final.

Since moving to Norway in 2008, McCormack represented Toppserien clubs Asker Fotball, FK Larvik and Kolbotn Fotball. She left Kolbotn for Donn Toppfotball in August 2010, before the club bankrupted at the end of the following season, prompting a return to the United States.

In January 2023, McCormack joined Irish club Treaty United.

In October 2023, McCormack was installed as co-owner and CEO of a reinvigorated organisation featuring Limerick’s only professional men’s and women’s soccer teams, with a focus on youth development. The takeover made McCormack the first female CEO in the League of Ireland. At the end of November 2025, McCormack stepped down from her role as CEO of Treaty United after more than two years in the position.

== International career ==
In late 2007 McCormack delayed her arrival in Norway to attend a training camp with the Canadian national team.

However, McCormack first appeared for the Republic of Ireland in three friendly games against the United States in September 2008. She then played in both defence and midfield for Ireland. McCormack's father Barry is from Athlone and her mother is from County Cork.

She won the last of her eight caps in a defeat to the Netherlands in August 2010. On 5 May 2014, Ireland manager Susan Ronan recalled McCormack to an experimental squad for a friendly against the Basque Country. McCormack started Ireland's 2–0 defeat in Azpeitia, which was not classified as a full international fixture.
