= Nora Holstad Berge =

Norwegian footballer (born 1987)

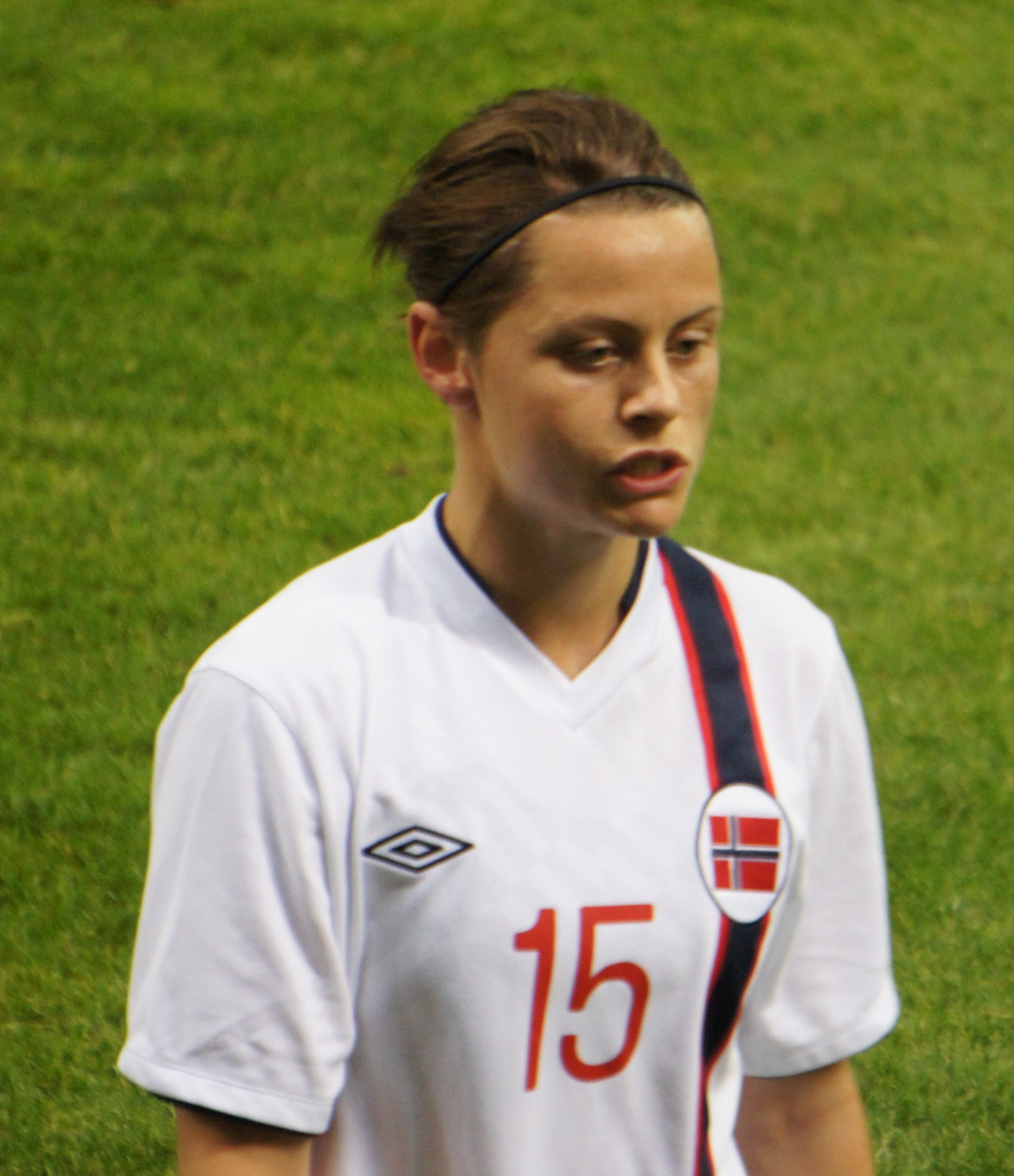

Personal information
- Full name: Nora Holstad Berge
- Date of birth: 26 March 1987 (age 39)
- Place of birth: Oslo, Norway
- Height: 1.74 m (5 ft 8 1/2 in)
- Position: Defender

Youth career
- Store Bergan IL

Senior career*
Years	Team	Apps	(Gls)
2003–2004	FK Larvik	12	(0)
2006–2009	Kolbotn	55	(7)
2010–2012	Linköpings FC	66	(5)
2013	Arna-Bjørnar	22	(7)
2014–2017	FC Bayern Munich	63	(5)
2017	North Carolina Courage	2	(0)

International career^{‡}
2003	Norway U-17	6	(1)
2003–2006	Norway U-19	21	(1)
2005–2006	Norway U-21	7	(0)
2007–2010	Norway U-23	26	(1)
2011–2017	Norway	69	(2)
Medal record
Women's football
Representing Norway
UEFA Women's Championship
Silver medal – second place	2013 Sweden	Team
- * Club domestic league appearances and goals as of 18:32, 25 July 2017 (UTC) ‡ National team caps and goals as of 11:12, 30 August 2017 (UTC)

Nora Holstad Berge (born 26 March 1987) is a retired Norwegian footballer who played as a defender for NWSL club North Carolina Courage and the Norway national team. In the past, she has played for FK Larvik, Kolbotn, Linköpings FC, Arna-Bjørnar, and FC Bayern Munich.

Holstad Berge has seen playing time with the national team during a number of major tournaments, including the 2011 World Cup, 2013 European Championship, 2015 World Cup, and 2017 European Championship.

== Honours ==
FC Bayern Munich

- Bundesliga: Winner 2015, 2016

North Carolina Courage

- NWSL Shield: 2017

Kolbotn Fotball

- Norwegian Women's Cup: Winner 2007
- Toppserien: Winner 2006
