= Lizzy Muzungu =

Zambian footballer (born 1984)

Personal information
- Full name: Lizzy Likika Muzungu
- Date of birth: 6 June 1984 (age 42)

Youth career
- All Kabwata Girls
- Asker

Senior career*
Years	Team	Apps	(Gls)
2005–2006	Liungen		
2007	Grand Bodø		
2010	Asker		

International career
- Zambia
- * Club domestic league appearances and goals

Lizzy Muzungu (born 6 June 1984) is a retired Zambian footballer.

She played for a Zambian girls' team All Kabwata Girls, which triumphed in several editions of the Norway Cup. In 2000 she was selected to sit beside Crown Prince Haakon at a Norway Cup banquet. She was allowed to migrate to Norway to play football, first for Asker's youth teams. By 2005 she played in Toppserien for IF Liungen. Following relegation, she returned to 2007 Toppserien when transferring to IK Grand Bodø. She later returned to Asker.

Muzungu was capped for Zambia.
