= 2004 Toppserien =

Toppserien
- Season: 2004
- Champions: Røa; 1st title
- Relegated: Arna-Bjørnar; Medkila
- Matches: 90
- Goals: 348 (3.87 per match)
- Top goalscorer: (Australia) Kristy Moore (20 goals)

The 2004 season of the Toppserien, the highest women's football (soccer) league in Norway, began on 17 April 2004 and ended on 30 October 2004.

18 games were played with 3 points given for wins and 1 for draws. Number nine and ten were relegated, while the two top teams from the First Division were promoted.

Røa won the league one point ahead of Trondheims-Ørn.

== League table ==
Pos	Team	Pld	W	D	L	GF	GA	GD	Pts	Qualification or relegation
1	Røa (C)	18	14	2	2	39	9	+30	44	Qualification for the UEFA Women's Cup first qualifying round
2	Trondheims-Ørn	18	13	4	1	46	18	+28	43	
3	Fløya	18	10	3	5	47	22	+25	33	
4	Asker	18	9	4	5	37	23	+14	31	
5	Kolbotn	18	9	1	8	51	34	+17	28	
6	Team Strømmen	18	7	2	9	36	39	−3	23	
7	Sandviken	18	4	6	8	23	44	−21	18	
8	Klepp	18	5	2	11	26	40	−14	17	
9	Arna-Bjørnar (R)	18	4	1	13	31	54	−23	13	Relegation to First Division
10	Medkila (R)	18	2	1	15	12	65	−53	7	Relegation to First Division

Source: NIFS
Rules for classification: 1) points; 2) goal difference; 3) number of goals scored.
(C) Champions; (R) Relegated

== Top goalscorers ==
- 20 goals:
  - (Australia) Kristy Moore, Fløya
- 17 goals:
  - (Norway) Elene Moseby, Team Strømmen
  - (Norway) Ragnhild Gulbrandsen, Trondheims-Ørn
- 12 goals:
  - (Norway) Tonje Hansen, Kolbotn
- 11 goals:
  - (Norway) Melissa Wiik, Asker
- 10 goals:
  - (Norway) Solveig Gulbrandsen, Kolbotn
- 9 goals:
  - (Norway) Ingrid Camilla Fosse Sæthre, Arna-Bjørnar
  - (Norway) Kjersti Thun, Asker
  - (Norway) Tone Heimlund, Fløya
  - (Norway) Siv Elin Byberg, Klepp
- 8 goals:
  - (Norway) Heidi Pedersen, Trondheims-Ørn

== Promotion and relegation ==
- Arna-Bjørnar and Medkila were relegated to the First Division
- Kattem and Liungen were promoted from the First Division.
