= 2006 Toppserien =

Toppserien
- Season: 2006
- Champions: Kolbotn; 3rd title
- Relegated: Liungen
- Matches: 90
- Goals: 417 (4.63 per match)
- Top goalscorer: (Norway) Elise Thorsnes (Norway) Tonje Hansen (19 goals each)

The 2006 season of the Toppserien, the highest women's football (soccer) league in Norway, began on 6 May 2006 and ended on 28 October 2006.

18 games were played with 3 points given for wins and 1 for draws. Number nine and ten went to a playoff round with number three and four from the First Division. The two top teams from the First Division were promoted, as the league was expanded from 10 teams to 12 teams in 2007.

Kolbotn won the league after beating Trondheims-Ørn on goal difference.

== League table ==
Pos	Team	Pld	W	D	L	GF	GA	GD	Pts	Qualification or relegation
1	Kolbotn (C)	18	13	3	2	76	17	+59	42	Qualification for the UEFA Women's Cup second qualifying round
2	Trondheims-Ørn	18	13	3	2	47	10	+37	42	
3	Røa	18	12	3	3	69	24	+45	39	
4	Team Strømmen	18	12	2	4	47	25	+22	38	
5	Arna-Bjørnar	18	11	2	5	60	26	+34	35	
6	Amazon Grimstad	18	7	2	9	42	32	+10	23	
7	Fløya	18	4	2	12	24	57	−33	14	
8	Sandviken	18	4	1	13	25	63	−38	13	
9	Klepp (O)	18	3	2	13	17	61	−44	11	Qualification for the relegation play-offs
10	Liungen (R)	18	1	0	17	10	102	−92	3	Qualification for the relegation play-offs

Source: NIFS
Rules for classification: 1) points; 2) goal difference; 3) number of goals scored.
(C) Champions; (O) Play-off winners; (R) Relegated

== Top goalscorers ==
- 19 goals:
  - (Norway) Elise Thorsnes, Arna-Bjørnar
  - (Norway) Tonje Hansen, Kolbotn
- 16 goals:
  - (Norway) Elene Moseby, Team Strømmen
- 14 goals:
  - (England) Una Nwajei, Amazon Grimstad
  - (Norway) Kristine Edner, Røa
- 12 goals:
  - (Norway) Kristin Lie, Trondheims-Ørn
- 11 goals:
  - (Norway) Trine Rønning, Kolbotn
  - (Norway) Guro Knutsen, Røa
  - (Norway) Solfrid Andersen, Trondheims-Ørn
- 10 goals:
  - (Norway) Trude Amundsen, Sandviken
- 9 goals:
  - (Norway) Madeleine Giske, Arna-Bjørnar
  - (Norway) Ingrid Camilla Fosse Sæthre, Arna-Bjørnar
  - (Norway) Kristin Blystad Bjerke, Kolbotn
  - (Norway) Linda Stadsøy, Røa
  - (Norway) Lene Mykjåland, Røa

== Relegation play-offs ==
- The qualification matches were contested between Klepp (9th in the Toppserien), Liungen (10th in the Toppserien), Grand Bodø (3rd in the First Division), and Manglerud Star (4th in the First Division). Grand Bodø and Klepp won, and were respectively promoted to, and stayed in, the Toppserien. Liungen was relegated to the First Division.
- Grand Bodø - Liungen 1–0
- Manglerud Star - Klepp 0–1
- Liungen - Grand Bodø 0–1
- Klepp - Manglerud Star 4–0
