= Kristine Edner =

Norwegian footballer (born 1976)

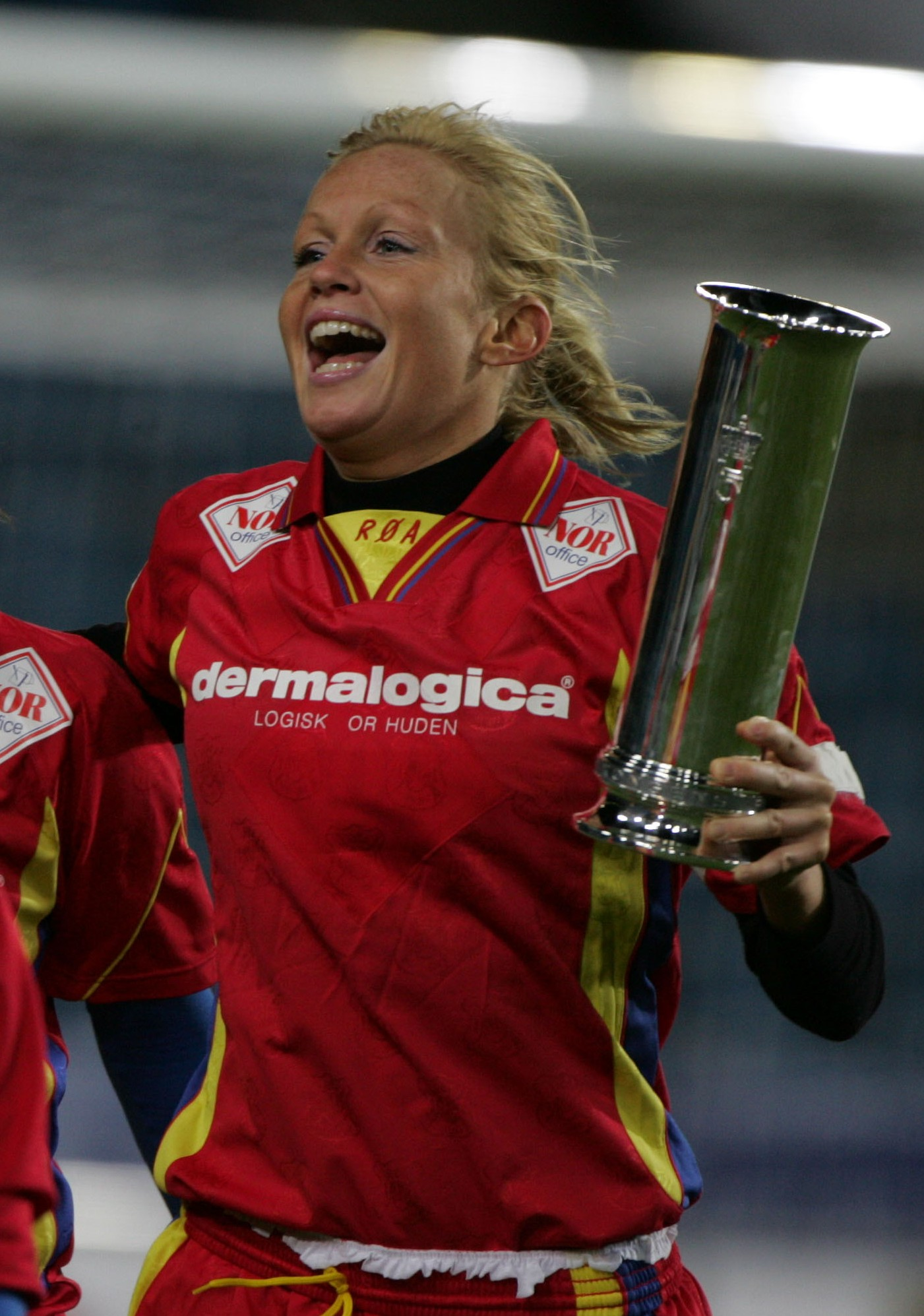
- Edner in 2004

Personal information
- Full name: Kristine Edner Wæhler
- Date of birth: 8 March 1976 (age 50)
- Place of birth: Røa, Norway
- Position: Midfielder

Senior career*
Years	Team	Apps	(Gls)
1993–2009	Røa	126	(46)

International career^{‡}
	Norway	10	
- * Club domestic league appearances and goals ‡ National team caps and goals as of 20 September 2003 (before the 2003 FIFA Women's World Cup)

Kristine Edner Wæhler (born 8 November 1976) is a retired Norwegian footballer who played as a midfielder for the Norway women's national football team. She was part of the team at the 2003 FIFA Women's World Cup. On club level she played for Røa IL in Norway.

== Honors and awards ==
with Røa

- Toppserien Champions: 2004, 2007, 2008, 2009
- Norwegian Women's Cup: 2004, 2006, 2008, 2009

== Personal life ==
She is married to footballer Thomas Wæhler.
