= 2009 Toppserien =

Toppserien
- Season: 2009
- Champions: Røa; 4th title
- Relegated: Sandviken; Fortuna
- Matches: 132
- Goals: 475 (3.6 per match)
- Top goalscorer: (Norway) Lene Mykjåland (20 goals)

The 2009 Toppserien was the 26th season of top-tier women's football in Norway. A total of twelve teams contested the league, consisting of ten who competed in the previous season and two promoted from the 1. divisjon. Running from 13 April to 31 October 2009, it was won by Røa for the third consecutive year. As winners, Røa qualified for the Round of 32 of the 2010–11 UEFA Women's Champions League as the sole representative from Norway. Because Norway had dropped to ninth place in the UEFA coefficient rankings for 2010–11, the runners-up in the Toppserien could no longer enter the qualifying round of the Champions League, as had been the case in the previous season.

Røa were confirmed as league champions on the last day of the season after drawing 0–0 with runners-up Stabæk, thus becoming the second team in the league's history to secure three consecutive titles (Trondheims-Ørn managed four in a row in 1994–1997). With their fourth league title overall, Røa also drew level with Sprint/Jeløy in terms of number of titles won, behind Trondheims-Ørn and Asker. Stabæk finished three points behind Røa in what was their first season after relocating to Bærum and becoming an affiliate of Stabæk Fotball. They had previously competed as Asker. Kolbotn finished third, six points behind Røa and three behind Stabæk.

Neither of the two promoted teams were able to maintain their spot in the top flight. Fortuna Ålesund were the first team to be relegated to the 1. divisjon after losing 1–2 at home to Arna-Bjørnar on 26 September. They were joined by Sandviken on 10 October when they lost 0–4 at home, also to Arna-Bjørnar.

On 27 October, the Football Association of Norway penalized Fløya for their use of two ineligible players in the league and Norwegian Cup. The players, both acquired before the start of the season, were fielded in thirteen and nine matches respectively before it was discovered that the club had not registered the transfers properly. Fløya were fined 10,000 kroner and deducted four points. Consequently, they dropped from eighth to tenth place in the standings.

== League table ==
Pos	Team	Pld	W	D	L	GF	GA	GD	Pts	Qualification or relegation
1	Røa (C)	22	18	2	2	64	16	+48	56	Qualification for the Champions League round of 32
2	Stabæk	22	16	5	1	83	15	+68	53	
3	Kolbotn	22	16	2	4	51	25	+26	50	
4	Team Strømmen	22	11	3	8	48	31	+17	36	
5	Arna-Bjørnar	22	9	6	7	37	35	+2	33	
6	Trondheims-Ørn	22	9	4	9	37	41	−4	31	
7	Klepp	22	8	6	8	39	38	+1	30	
8	Kattem	22	7	4	11	28	45	−17	25	
9	Amazon Grimstad	22	7	1	14	14	33	−19	22	
10	Fløya	22	7	4	11	36	37	−1	21 (Note: Fløya 4 points deducted for using ineligible players.)	
11	Sandviken (R)	22	3	2	17	20	72	−52	11	Relegation to First Division
12	Fortuna Ålesund (R)	22	0	3	19	18	87	−69	3	Relegation to First Division

Source: rsssf.no
Rules for classification: 1) points; 2) goal difference; 3) number of goals scored.
(C) Champions; (R) Relegated

== Results ==
Home \ Away	AG	A-B	IFF	FÅ	KAT	KLP	KOL	RØA	ILS	STB	TS	ØRN
Amazon Grimstad	—	1–3	0–2	1–0	1–0	2–1	2–1	0–1	1–0	0–3	0–1	0–2
Arna-Bjørnar	1–1	—	1–0	3–1	1–2	5–3	0–3	1–5	2–0	1–1	3–0	3–0
Fløya	2–0	2–2	—	3–1	1–2	3–3	1–2	0–1	5–0	0–0	2–1	1–2
Fortuna Ålesund	0–1	1–2	0–2	—	0–0	3–3	2–6	0–6	1–2	0–5	0–8	2–2
Kattem	1–0	1–1	3–0	5–1	—	2–1	1–2	1–4	2–2	1–5	1–2	2–1
Klepp	1–0	1–1	3–2	7–1	3–0	—	1–1	0–3	4–1	1–4	2–0	1–0
Kolbotn	1–0	4–1	3–1	8–1	2–1	0–3	—	1–2	2–0	3–1	1–0	1–0
Røa	3–0	1–0	4–2	3–2	6–0	4–1	0–3	—	2–1	0–0	1–1	2–0
Sandviken	0–2	0–4	1–3	3–2	2–1	0–0	0–2	1–7	—	1–10	1–5	4–5
Stabæk	2–0	6–1	5–2	6–0	5–0	0–0	5–1	2–0	6–1	—	5–0	7–0
Team Strømmen	4–2	0–0	2–2	5–0	3–0	3–0	2–3	0–3	4–0	1–3	—	3–2
Trondheims-Ørn	4–0	2–1	1–0	6–0	2–2	3–0	1–1	0–6	2–0	2–2	0–3	—

Source: NRK Sport
Legend: Blue = home team win; Yellow = draw; Red = away team win.

== Top goalscorers ==
Rank	Player	Club	Goals
1	(Norway) Lene Mykjåland	Røa	20
2	(England) Kristy Moore	Stabæk	19
3	(Norway) Lise Klaveness	Stabæk	17
4	(Norway) Kristin Lie	Trondheims-Ørn	16
4	(Norway) Melissa Wiik	Stabæk	16
6	(Norway) Isabell Herlovsen	Kolbotn	13
6	(England) Una Nwajei	Team Strømmen	13
6	(Norway) Elise Thorsnes	Røa	13
9	(Norway) Miriam Mumtaz	Kolbotn	12
10	(England) Rebecca Angus	Kolbotn	10
10	(Norway) Anneli Giske	Fløya	10
