= 2005 Toppserien =

Toppserien
- Season: 2005
- Champions: Kolbotn; 2nd title
- Relegated: Asker; Kattem
- Matches: 90
- Goals: 369 (4.1 per match)
- Top goalscorer: (Norway) Tone Heimlund (18 goals)

The 2005 season of the Toppserien, the first-tier women's football (soccer) league in Norway, began on 16 April 2005 and ended on 22 October 2005.

18 games were played with 3 points given for wins and 1 for draws. Number nine and ten were originally relegated, but ninth-placed Liungen survived after Asker was forcibly relegated due to economic license issues. The two top teams from the First Division were promoted.

Kolbotn won the league.

== League table ==
Pos	Team	Pld	W	D	L	GF	GA	GD	Pts	Qualification or relegation
1	Kolbotn (C)	18	14	3	1	72	15	+57	45	Qualification for the UEFA Women's Cup second qualifying round
2	Team Strømmen	18	12	3	3	44	22	+22	39	
3	Fløya	18	10	3	5	49	26	+23	33	
4	Trondheims-Ørn	18	10	3	5	31	17	+14	33	
5	Klepp	18	8	5	5	39	24	+15	29	
6	Røa	18	9	1	8	35	28	+7	28	
7	Asker (Note: Asker was forcibly relegated due to economic license issues.) (R)	18	7	3	8	34	30	+4	24	Relegation to First Division
8	Sandviken	18	4	3	11	25	58	−33	15	
9	Liungen	18	2	1	15	19	76	−57	7	
10	Kattem (R)	18	1	1	16	20	72	−52	4	Relegation to First Division

Source: NIFS
Rules for classification: 1) points; 2) goal difference; 3) number of goals scored.
(C) Champions; (R) Relegated

== Top goalscorers ==
- 18 goals:
  - (Norway) Tone Heimlund, Fløya
- 14 goals:
  - (Norway) Solveig Gulbrandsen, Kolbotn
- 13 goals:
  - (Nigeria) Maureen Mmadu, Klepp
  - (Norway) Tonje Hansen, Kolbotn
  - (Norway) Isabell Herlovsen, Kolbotn
- 12 goals:
  - (Norway) Dagny Mellgren, Klepp
  - (Norway) Lene Espedal, Kolbotn
- 11 goals:
  - (Norway) Lindy Melissa Wiik, Asker
  - (Australia) Kristy Moore, Fløya
  - (Norway) Trine Rønning, Kolbotn
- 10 goals:
  - (Norway) Ingunn Sørum, Liungen
- 9 goals:
  - (Norway) Siri Nordby, Røa

== Promotion and relegation ==
- Asker and Kattem were relegated to the First Division
- Arna-Bjørnar and Amazon Grimstad were promoted from the First Division
