= Melissa Wiik =

Norwegian footballer (born 1985)

Personal information
- Full name: Lindy Melissa Løvbræk Wiik
- Date of birth: 7 February 1985 (age 41)
- Place of birth: Oslo, Norway
- Height: 1.65 m (5 ft 5 in)
- Position: Forward

Team information
- Current team: Urædd FK
- Number: 10

Youth career
- 1999–2000: Slemmestad

Senior career*
Years	Team	Apps	(Gls)
2001–2008	Asker	83	(61)
2009	Stabæk	21	(18)
2010–2011	VfL Wolfsburg	20	(10)
2011–2015	Stabæk	58	(15)
2016–	Urædd	22	(5)

International career^{‡}
2004–2012	Norway	63	(15)
- * Club domestic league appearances and goals ‡ National team caps and goals as of 23:14, 27 August 2016 (UTC)

Lindy Melissa Løvbræk Wiik (born 7 February 1985) is a Norwegian footballer who plays for Urædd FK and the Norway national team.

== Career ==
Asker played in the elite Toppserien league in Norway, and Wiik was the league's top scorer of the 2007 season, with 22 goals from 22 matches. At the start of 2009 Wiik with most of the other Asker players joined the newly formed Stabæk Fotball Kvinner, continuing in the Toppserien. In January 2010 Wiik signed to play for the German club VfL Wolfsburg, and scored her first three goals for her new club at an indoor tournament on 23 January with over 4000 spectators.

In 2011 Wiik returned to Stabæk FK. In early May she suffered a damaged anterior cruciate ligament, surgery followed in June. Her goal to recover quickly materialized with her in Football training by early October.

== Career statistics ==
Statistics accurate as of match played 10 August 2013

Club	Season	Division	League		Cup		Total	
Club	Season	Division	Apps	Goals	Apps	Goals	Apps	Goals
2003	Asker	Toppserien	13	2	1	1	14	3
2004	Asker	Toppserien	16	11	3	4	19	15
2005	Asker	Toppserien	18	11	5	6	23	17
2007	Asker	Toppserien	20	22	0	0	20	22
2008	Asker	Toppserien	16	15	0	0	16	15
2009	Stabæk	Toppserien	21	18	0	0	21	18
2009–10	Wolfsburg	Bundesliga	11	7	0	0	11	7
2010–11	Wolfsburg	Bundesliga	9	3	1	1	10	4
2011	Stabæk	Toppserien	7	3	1	2	8	5
2012	Stabæk	Toppserien	4	1	1	0	5	1
2013	Stabæk	Toppserien	18	3	5	2	23	5
2014	Stabæk	Toppserien	12	3	3	3	15	6
2015	Stabæk	Toppserien	17	5	3	2	20	7
2016	Urædd	Toppserien	22	5	2	0	24	5
Career Total			204	109	25	21	229	130

== International career ==
She is a member of the Norway national team. She was named on 9 June to the bronze medalist team Norway at the 2008 Summer Olympics, held in Beijing, China. At the opening match on 6 August she scored Norway's second goal in the fourth minute, which ended Norway 2 – USA 0.

== International goals ==
No.	Date	Venue	Opponent	Score	Result	Competition
1.	9 March 2005	Lagos, Portugal	China	2–1	2–1	2005 Algarve Cup
2.	7 March 2007	Faro, Portugal	Germany	2–1	2–1	2007 Algarve Cup
3.	14 March 2007	Lagoa, Portugal	Finland	1–0	2–0	2007 Algarve Cup
4.	17 June 2007	Ramat Gan, Israel	Israel	3–0	3–0	UEFA Women's Euro 2009 qualifying
5.	21 June 2007	Lillestrøm, Norway	Austria	2–0	3–0	UEFA Women's Euro 2009 qualifying
6.	27 October 2007	Stavanger, Norway	Russia	1–0	3–0	UEFA Women's Euro 2009 qualifying
7.	7 March 2008	Albufeira, Portugal	China	3–1	3–1	2008 Algarve Cup
8.	12 March 2008	Vila Real de Santo António, Portugal	Germany	1–0	2–0	2008 Algarve Cup
9.	3 May 2008	Kristiansand, Norway	Israel	1–0	7–0	UEFA Women's Euro 2009 qualifying
10.	3 May 2008	Kristiansand, Norway	Israel	3–0	7–0	UEFA Women's Euro 2009 qualifying
11.	7 May 2008	Stavanger, Norway	Poland	3–0	3–0	UEFA Women's Euro 2009 qualifying
12.	6 August 2008	Qinhuangdao, China	United States	2–0	2–0	2008 Summer Olympics
13.	9 AUgust 2008	Qinhuangdao, China	New Zealand	1–0	1–0	2008 Summer Olympics
14.	24 March 2010	Vila Real de Santo António, Portugal	Sweden	1–0	2–2	2010 Algarve Cup

== Personal life ==
She has a relationship with Péter Kovács.

== Honours ==
=== Club ===
Stabæk

- Toppserien (1): 2013
- Norwegian Cup (3): 2011, 2012, 2013

=== Individual ===
- Top Scorer, Toppserien (1): 2007 (22 goals)
