= Kristin Lie =

Norwegian footballer (born 1978)

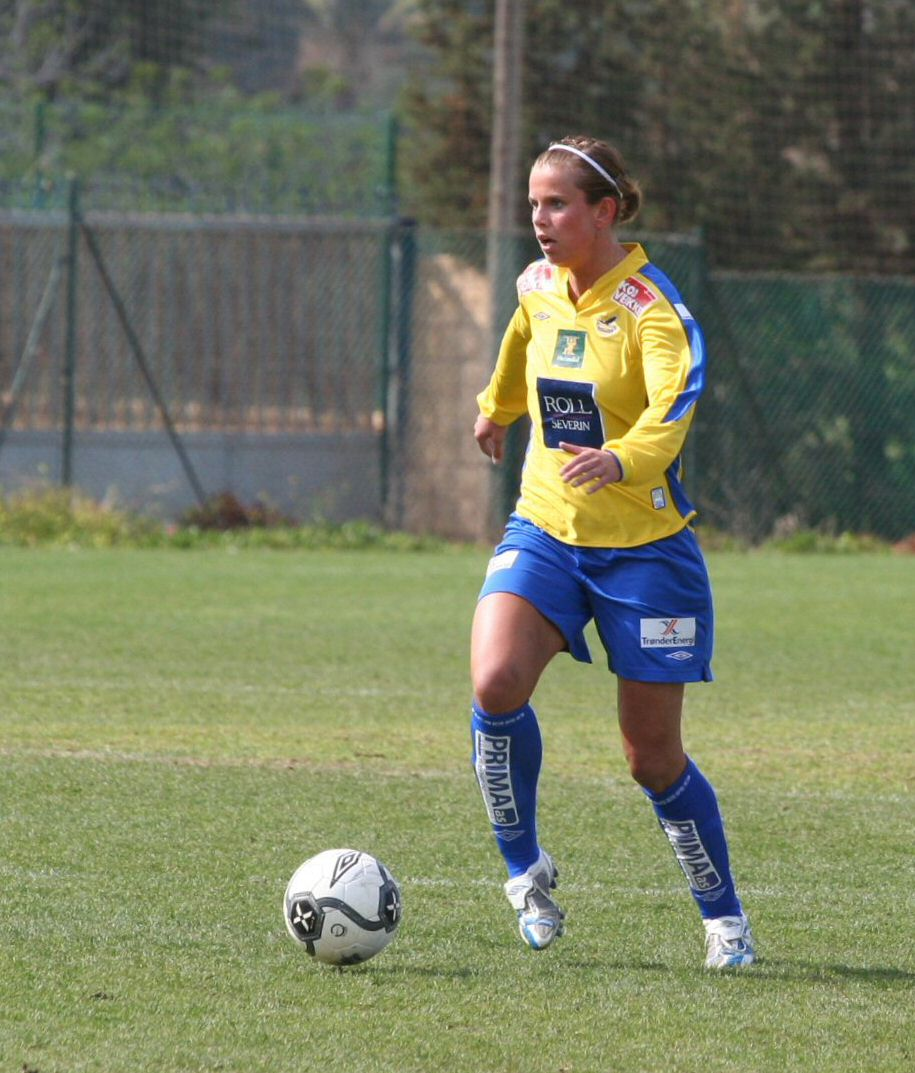

Personal information
- Date of birth: 13 December 1978 (age 47)
- Position: Striker

Youth career
- Namdalseid

Senior career*
Years	Team	Apps	(Gls)
- Beitstad
–1999	Verdal	10	(0)
1999–2013	Trondheims-Ørn	263	(90)
2014–2017	Egge	21	(41)
2022-	Sørlia	6	(5)

International career
2007–2009	Norway	16	(1)
- * Club domestic league appearances and goals

Kristin Lie (born 13 December 1978) is a Norwegian footballer who played as a striker for Egge. She was also capped while playing for Norway.

== Career ==
Lie was born in Steinkjer Municipality and grew up in Namdalseid Municipality in Nord Trøndelag county, where she started her football career with three local clubs, Namdalseid, Beitstad and Verdal. She joined Trondheims-Ørn in 1999.

Lie was the team's top scorer in four consecutive seasons from 2006 to 2009 and also became top scorer in the 2007 Toppserien.

With Trondheims-Ørn, Lie won the Toppserien in 2000, 2001 and 2003, and the Norwegian Women's Cup in 1999, 2001 and 2003. The team also became runner-up in the Toppserien in 1999, 2004 and 2006, as well as in the 2010 Norwegian Women's Cup.

Lie signed a two-year contract extension to continue with Trondheims-Ørn in February 2012, and after 15 seasons with the club she played her last match at home when she got seven minutes as a substitute against Klepp in October 2013. Her last match before her retirement from top football was the last match of the 2013 Toppserien season, away against Lillestrøm.

For Norway, Lie played 12 matches and scored seven goals for the Under-21 team between 1999 and 2001. In 2007, the same year as she became top goalscorer in the Toppserien, she made her debut for the senior national team against Finland. She was a member of the Norwegian squad for the 2009 UEFA Women's European Championship, and played a total of 16 matches for the Norway, scoring one goal, between 2007 and 2009.
