= Ann Iren Mørkved =

Norwegian footballer (born 1981)

Ann-Iren Mørkved
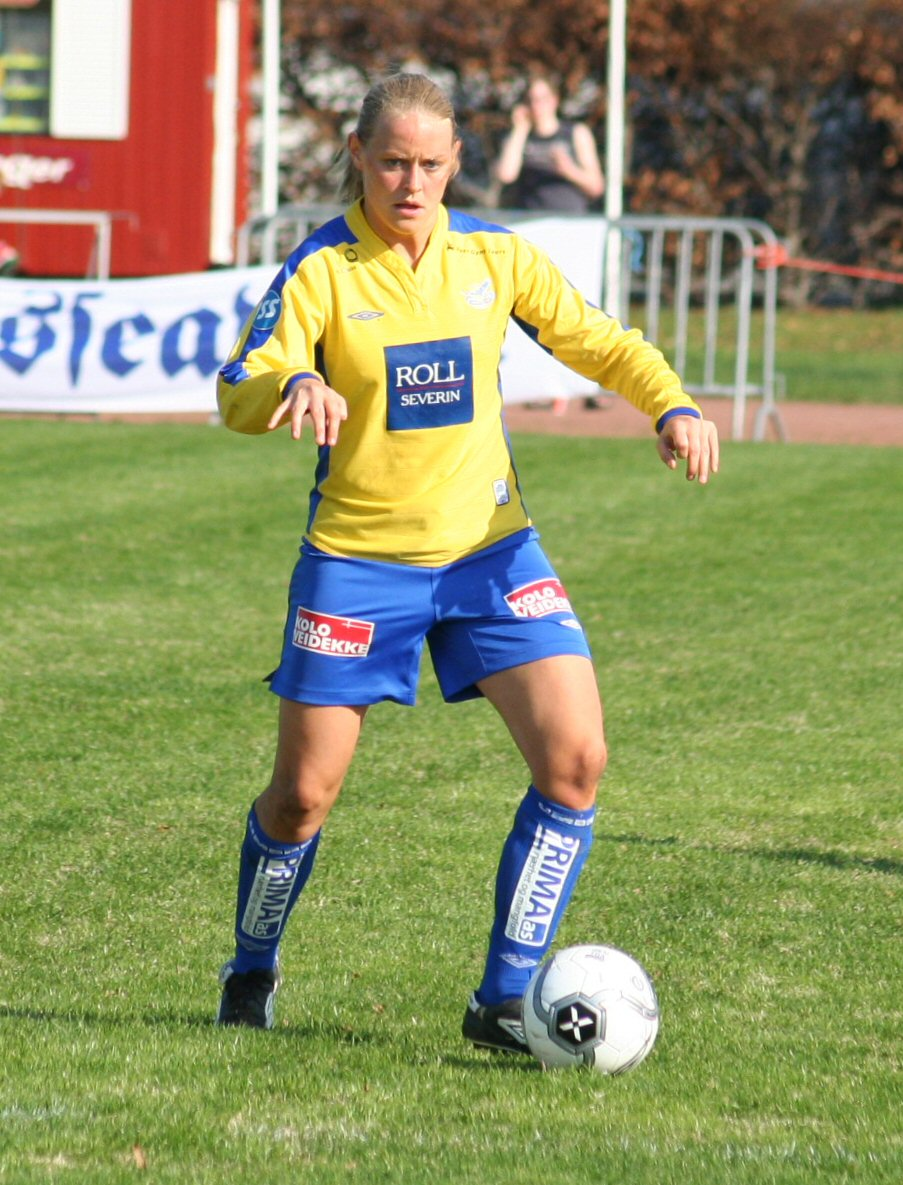

Personal information
- Full name: Ann-Iren Mørkved Skevik
- Date of birth: 7 August 1981 (age 45)
- Position: Defender

Youth career
- Innstranden

Senior career*
Years	Team	Apps	(Gls)
–2000	Grand Bodø		
2001	Athene Moss		
2002–2007	Trondheims-Ørn		
2002	→ Fløya (loan)		
2008	Grand Bodø		
2009–2012	Kattem		
2013	Grand Bodø		
2014	Trondheims-Ørn		
2017	Ranheim		

International career^{‡}
1998	Norway u-17	3	(0)
2000–2005	Norway u-21	11	(0)
2004–2005	Norway	11	(0)
- * Club domestic league appearances and goals ‡ National team caps and goals as of 19 December 2007

Ann-Iren Mørkved (married Skevik, born 7 August 1981) is a Norwegian football defender. She played for Trondheims-Ørn and the Norwegian national team.

She retired from first-tier football in 2014.
