= Thomas Rønning =

Norwegian footballer (born 1985)

Personal information
- Full name: Thomas Rønning
- Date of birth: 16 July 1985 (age 41)
- Place of birth: Trondheim, Norway
- Position: Midfielder

Senior career*
| Years | Team | Apps | (Gls) |
| 2005–2007 | Strindheim | 11 | (6) |
| 2008–2011 | Bodø/Glimt | 91 | (7) |
| 2012–2015 | Ranheim | 88 | (7) |
- * Club domestic league appearances and goals as of 20 April 2015

Thommas Rønning (born 16 July 1985) is a Norwegian former professional football player. He played as a central midfielder, and played for both Bodø/Glimt, and Ranheim.

He is the brother of female football player Trine Rønning who plays for Stabæk Fotball.

== Career statistics ==
| Season | Club | Division | League | | Cup | | Total | |
| Season | Club | Division | Apps | Goals | Apps | Goals | Apps | Goals |
|---|---|---|---|---|---|---|---|---|
| 2008 | Bodø/Glimt | Tippeligaen | 19 | 1 | 3 | 0 | 22 | 1 |
| 2009 | Bodø/Glimt | Tippeligaen | 23 | 2 | 3 | 0 | 26 | 2 |
| 2010 | Bodø/Glimt | Adeccoligaen | 25 | 0 | 3 | 0 | 28 | 0 |
| 2011 | Bodø/Glimt | Adeccoligaen | 24 | 4 | 3 | 0 | 27 | 4 |
| 2012 | Ranheim | Adeccoligaen | 27 | 1 | 0 | 0 | 27 | 1 |
| 2013 | Ranheim | Adeccoligaen | 27 | 3 | 3 | 1 | 30 | 4 |
| 2014 | Ranheim | 1. divisjon | 26 | 3 | 4 | 0 | 30 | 3 |
| 2015 | Ranheim | OBOS-ligaen | 8 | 0 | 1 | 0 | 9 | 0 |
| Career Total | | | 179 | 14 | 20 | 1 | 199 | 15 |
