= Tone Røst Heimlund =

Norwegian footballer (born 1985)

Tone Heimlund
Personal information
- Date of birth: 24 May 1985 (age 41)
- Height: 1.76 m (5 ft 9 in)

Senior career*
Years	Team	Apps	(Gls)
2002-2007	Fløya		

International career
2002	Norway U-17	6	(1)
2003-2004	Norway U-19	25	(15)
2005-2006	Norway U-21	7	(3)
2007	Norway U-23	2	(0)
- * Club domestic league appearances and goals

Tone Heimlund (born 24 May 1985) is a Norwegian retired football midfielder who played for Fløya and the Norwegian national team.

== Club career ==
Heimlund had a breakout season with Fløya scoring 18 goals in the Toppserien in 2005. A serious knee injury ended Heimlund's promising career in 2007. Heimlund took up competitive cross-country skiing as an alternative in 2009 in order to still compete in sports.

== International career ==
=== Youth ===
Heimlund also participated at the 2003 UEFA Women's Under-19 Championship. Heimlund efforts helped Norway reach the final ultimately losing to France.

=== Senior ===
Heimlund was selected as part of the Norwegian squad at the 2005 European Championships.
