= Christine Bøe Jensen =

Norwegian footballer (born 1975)

Personal information
- Full name: Christine Bøe Jensen
- Date of birth: 3 June 1975 (age 51)
- Place of birth: Hammerfest, Norway
- Height: 1.68 m (5 ft 6 in)
- Position: Midfielder

Youth career
- HIF-Stein

Senior career*
Years	Team	Apps	(Gls)
- Kvaløysletta
- Fløya
1999–2000	Grand Bodø		
2001–2003	Kolbotn		
- Manglerud Star
- Vålerenga

International career^{‡}
2000–2001	Norway	18	(2)
Medal record
Women's football
Representing Norway
Olympic Games
Gold medal – first place	2000 Sydney	Team competition
- * Club domestic league appearances and goals as of 14:16, 30 September 2014 (UTC) ‡ National team caps and goals as of 14:16, 30 September 2014 (UTC)

Christine Bøe Jensen (born 3 June 1975) is a Norwegian former footballer and Olympic champion, born in Hammerfest.

Jensen's first club was HIF-Stein in her native Finnmark. She later moved to Tromsø and turned out for Kvaløysletta and Fløya, before linking up with Grand Bodø. In 2000, she broke into the Norway women's national football team as a Grand Bodø player and was included in the gold medal-winning squad at the 2000 Summer Olympics in Sydney.

On the back of that success Jensen secured a transfer to Kolbotn in 2001. In 2002, she was top goalscorer with 19 as Kolbotn won the Toppserien title. She later played for Manglerud Star and Vålerenga.
