= IF Liungen =

Norwegian football club

- Full name: Idrettsforeningen Liungen
- Founded: 3 December 1916
- Dissolved: 1 January 2016
- Ground: Liungbanen, Lier

Idrettsforeningen Liungen was a Norwegian multi-sports club from Lier.

The club was founded on 3 December 1916 as IF Odd. Having to change name to avoid confusion with other clubs named Odd, "Liung" is the demonym for Lier. The club had sections for association football, team handball, Nordic skiing and athletics. The team colours were green with a yellow centre column and white shorts. This was later changed to bright yellow with green details as well as green shorts.

Liungen became best known for its women's football team. The team won its First Division group in 2000, qualifying for a playoff to Toppserien, the highest league in Norway. Liungen defeated both Fløya and Fortuna Ålesund, reaching the 2001 Toppserien. The team struggled, but found themselves one point over the relegation line with one match to go. Here, they lost 1–2 to Røa at home, meaning that Røa passed Liungen and the latter were relegated.

Liungen won the 2002 First Division by a wide margin, 14 points. The pattern repeated itself: In the 2003 Toppserien, Liungen could survive if they beat FK Larvik in the last round. Larvik had taken only one point from 17 matches, but held Liungen to 1–1 in the last match. Liungen were therefore relegated on goal difference, having equal points to Klepp—but bounced back from the 2004 First Division.

In the 2005 Toppserien, Liungen were originally relegated again, collecting only 7 points. However, the club was saved as 7th-placed Asker were thrown out with no valid license. Nonetheless, the 2006 Toppserien ended disastrously for Liungen. Scoring only 10 goals in 18 matches and conceding 102, the club ended a distant last with 3 points. That year, there was no direct relegation, rather a playout, but Liungen lost both matches 0–1 to Grand Bodø. The team was not relegated either. Having a financial deficit of 900,000 kr, Liungen withdrew from the First Division and had to restart on the lowest tier.

Men's football team in Liungen discontinued, being merged with Sparta/Bragerøen to found Stoppen SK on 12 April 2012. Liungen still existed as a children's club, but on 1 January 2016, it too was fully incorporated into Stoppen SK.

Liungen also operated the ski jumping hill Lyngåsbakken before World War II.
