= 2007 Toppserien =

Toppserien
- Season: 2007
- Champions: Røa; 2nd title
- Relegated: Sandviken; Grand Bodø
- Matches: 132
- Goals: 483 (3.66 per match)
- Top goalscorer: Melissa Wiik (22 goals)

The 2007 season of the Toppserien, the highest women's football (soccer) league in Norway, began on 21 April 2007 and ended on 3 November 2007.

22 games were played with 3 points given for wins and 1 for draws. Number eleven and twelve were relegated, while the two top teams from the First Division were promoted.

Røa won the league, three points ahead of reigning champion Kolbotn.

== League table ==
| Pos | Team | Pld | W | D | L | GF | GA | GD | Pts | Qualification or relegation |
|---|---|---|---|---|---|---|---|---|---|---|
| 1 | Røa (C) | 22 | 17 | 2 | 3 | 63 | 24 | +39 | 53 | Qualification for the UEFA Women's Cup first qualifying round |
| 2 | Kolbotn | 22 | 16 | 2 | 4 | 71 | 18 | +53 | 50 | |
| 3 | Asker | 22 | 15 | 5 | 2 | 68 | 18 | +50 | 50 | |
| 4 | Arna-Bjørnar | 22 | 12 | 4 | 6 | 47 | 34 | +13 | 40 | |
| 5 | Team Strømmen | 22 | 10 | 6 | 6 | 37 | 29 | +8 | 36 | |
| 6 | Trondheims-Ørn | 22 | 9 | 3 | 10 | 38 | 38 | 0 | 30 | |
| 7 | Klepp | 22 | 8 | 4 | 10 | 35 | 30 | +5 | 28 | |
| 8 | Amazon Grimstad | 22 | 7 | 5 | 10 | 29 | 46 | −17 | 26 | |
| 9 | Fløya | 22 | 7 | 4 | 11 | 36 | 52 | −16 | 25 | |
| 10 | Kattem | 22 | 5 | 4 | 13 | 24 | 55 | −31 | 19 | |
| 11 | Sandviken (R) | 22 | 2 | 3 | 17 | 16 | 76 | −60 | 9 | Relegation to First Division |
| 12 | Grand Bodø (R) | 22 | 2 | 2 | 18 | 19 | 63 | −44 | 8 | Relegation to First Division |

Source: NIFS
Rules for classification: 1) points; 2) goal difference; 3) number of goals scored.
(C) Champions; (R) Relegated

== Top goalscorers ==
- 22 goals:
  - (Norway) Melissa Wiik, Asker
- 14 goals:
  - (Norway) Ragnhild Gulbrandsen, Asker
  - (Norway) Solveig Gulbrandsen, Kolbotn
- 12 goals:
  - (Norway) Kristin Blystad Bjerke, Kolbotn
- 11 goals:
  - (Norway) Madeleine Giske, Arna-Bjørnar
  - (England) Rebecca Angus, Kolbotn
  - (Norway) Lene Mykjåland, Røa
  - (Norway) Kristin Lie, Trondheims-Ørn
- 10 goals:
  - (Australia) Kristy Moore, Fløya
- 9 goals:
  - (Norway) Guro Knutsen, Røa
  - (Norway) Ida Elise Enget, Team Strømmen
  - (Norway) Lene Storløkken, Team Strømmen

== Promotion and relegation ==
- Sandviken and Grand Bodø were relegated to the First Division.
- Larvik and Fart were promoted from the First Division.
