= Kristin Blystad-Bjerke =

Norwegian footballer (born 1980)

Personal information
- Full name: Kristin Blystad-Bjerke
- Date of birth: 7 July 1980 (age 46)
- Place of birth: Norway
- Position: Forward

Senior career*
Years	Team	Apps	(Gls)
1997–1999	Kolbotn	43	(11)
1999–2002	Aalborg Freja		
2002–2008	Kolbotn	108	(51)

International career
2002–2005	Norway		
- * Club domestic league appearances and goals

Kristin Blystad-Bjerke (born 7 July 1980) is a Norwegian footballer who played as a striker for Kolbotn of the Toppserien and Norway women's national football team.

== Club career ==
Blystad-Bjerke started her career playing for Kolbotn in 1997. Later on, she moved to Denmark to play for Idrætsklubben Aalborg Freja for a couple of years, then to return eventually to Kolbotn in 2002.

After over 200 games and around 60 goals, she was released in 2008, the same year when she was the club's top scorer with 13 goals.

== International career ==
Blystad-Bjerke played for the Norway women's team, in which she got a silver medal after finishing second in the UEFA Women's Euro 2005, coming at 87th minute in the final against Germany.

== Personal life ==
In January 2009, Blystad-Bjerke married national team-mate Trine Rønning, shortly after same-sex marriage in Norway was made legal.
