= Monica Enlid =

Norwegian footballer (born 1973)

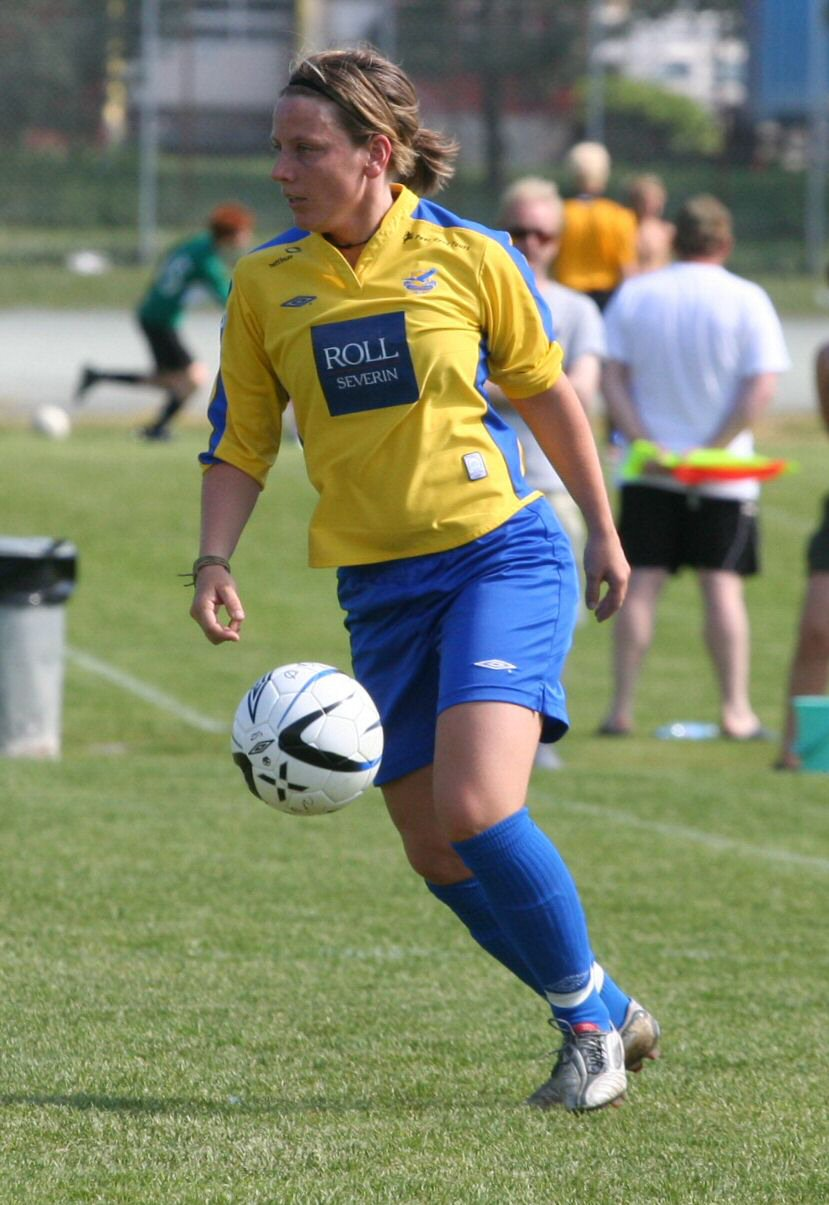
- Enlid in 2007

Personal information
- Date of birth: 24 April 1973 (age 53)
- Position: Midfielder

Senior career*
Years	Team	Apps	(Gls)
1997–2005	Trondheims-Ørn	136	(30)

International career
1995–1998	Norway	9	(0)
- * Club domestic league appearances and goals

Monica Enlid (born 24 April 1973) is a Norwegian footballer who played as a midfielder for the Norway women's national football team. She was part of the team at the UEFA Women's Euro 1995. On club level she played for Trondheims-Ørn in Norway.
