= Rebecca Angus =

English footballer

Personal information
- Full name: Rebecca Louise Leirmo Harvey
- Date of birth: 2 December 1985 (age 40)
- Place of birth: Redcar, England
- Position: Striker

Team information
- Current team: Snøgg Fotball

College career
Years	Team	Apps	(Gls)
2003–2006	Carson–Newman Eagles	86	(73)

Senior career*
Years	Team	Apps	(Gls)
2001–2003	Marton		
2007–2010	Kolbotn		(31)
2011	Jitex	17	(3)
2012–2014	Vålerenga	53	(13)
2015–	Snøgg Fotball		

International career
2008	England U23		
- * Club domestic league appearances and goals

Rebecca Louise Leirmo Harvey (née Angus; born 2 December 1985) is an English football striker, who most recently played for Vålerenga of Norway's Toppserien.

Angus came from the American South Atlantic Conference when she signed for Kolbotn Fotball in the Toppserien in 2007. She became an important player in her two last seasons in the team scoring 21 goals, which earned her a move to Jitex BK in the Swedish Damallsvenskan. For the 2012 season she returned to the Toppserien to play for newly-promoted Vålerenga.

In 2008 she played for the England women's national under-23 football team.
