= Bente Musland =

Norwegian footballer (born 1981)

Bente Haveland
Personal information
- Birth name: Bente Musland
- Date of birth: 2 March 1981 (age 45)
- Position: Striker

Youth career
- Uskedal
- Rosendal

Senior career*
Years	Team	Apps	(Gls)
–1998	Rosendal		
1998	Solid		
1999	Sandviken	18	(9)
2000–2004	Arna-Bjørnar	105	(52)
2006	Follese		
2007–2008	Åsane		
- Nordhordland
- Rosendal

International career
1998	Norway U17	6	(5)
1999	Norway U18	1	(0)
2001-2002	Norway U21	10	(6)
- * Club domestic league appearances and goals

Bente Musland, married Haveland (born 2 March 1981) is a Norwegian footballer who played as a striker.

== Career ==
She hails from Uskedalen and played children's football for Uskedal and Rosendal. She was discovered by the Football Association and taken into youth national team training camps. She made her youth international debut for Norway U17 against Finland U17 in May 1998, scoring on her debut.

By June 1997, she was already approaching 50 league goals; Rosendal's team having scored 83 goals in the first 11 matches of the season. In August 1997, Musland scored 9 goals in a 25–0 evisceration of Åsane. By that time, Musland was behind 61 of the team's 120 goals in 14 matches.

She was ready to play on a higher level, and in August 1998 she joined IL Solid on the second tier. On her debut, she scored twice in a victory over Haugar. Ahead of the 1999 season, however, Solid discontinued their team. Musland was considering her options while wanting to finish Stord Upper Secondary School. Ultimately, she moved to Bergen to finish secondary school there, and play for IL Sandviken.

In 2000 she moved on to a team on the outskirts of Bergen city, Arna-Bjørnar. Musland had considered whether she changed clubs too often, but liked the higher level at Arna-Bjørnar training sessions. She scored twice on her legue debut for her new club. Musland reached the 2000 cup final with Arna-Bjørnar, as the first player from Kvinnherad to do so. Arna-Bjørnar lost the final.

She started the 2001 season with two assists in the first match, followed by three goals in the next one. Musland then became top goalscorer in the 2003 Toppserien, jointly with national team stalwarts Marianne Pettersen and Solveig Gulbrandsen.

After the 2004 season, Musland was tired of football on an elite level. Despite being wanted by IL Sandviken, she signed for lowly Follese FK in 2006. She moved to Åsane in 2007. In 2009 she continued to ENK, a cooperation team between Nordhordland, Eikanger and Kvernbit.

== Personal life ==
Bente Musland married Ølver Haveland on 7/7/07, 7 July 2007. The family settled in his home village of Omvikdalen in Kvam.
