= Lene Espedal =

Norwegian footballer (born 1983)

Personal information
- Date of birth: 11 June 1983 (age 43)
- Position: Midfielder

Youth career
- –1999: Sandved

Senior career*
Years	Team	Apps	(Gls)
1999–2004	Klepp		
2005–2006	Kolbotn		
2007–2008	Klepp		

International career^{‡}
1999–2000	Norway u-17	11	(0)
2001	Norway u-18	2	(0)
2002	Norway u-19	8	(0)
2002–2005	Norway u-21	10	(0)
2004	Norway	1	(0)
- * Club domestic league appearances and goals as of 6 November 2019 ‡ National team caps and goals as of 6 November 2019

Lene Espedal (born 11 January 1983) is a Norwegian former football midfielder.

She played junior football for Sandved IL and made her senior debut Klepp IL in 1999. After a spell in Kolbotn IL she rejoined Klepp before retiring after the 2008 season.

She won her sole cap for the Norway women's national football team in the 2004 Algarve Cup. A prolific youth international, she was a squad member for the 2002 UEFA Women's Under-19 Championship.
