= Solveig Gulbrandsen =

Norwegian footballer (born 1981)

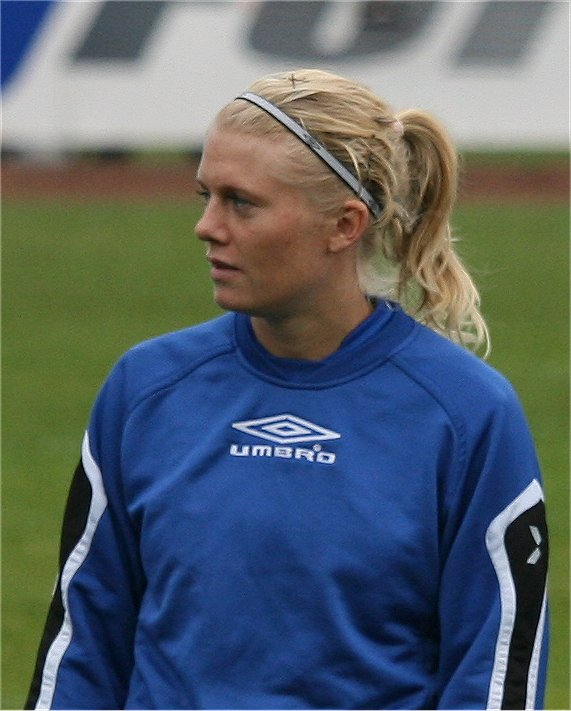
- Solveig Gulbrandsen in October 2007

Personal information
- Full name: Solveig Ingersdatter Gulbrandsen
- Date of birth: 12 January 1981 (age 45)
- Place of birth: Oslo, Norway
- Height: 1.69 m (5 ft 7 in)
- Position: Midfielder

Senior career*
Years	Team	Apps	(Gls)
1997–2008	Kolbotn	190	(102)
2009	Stabæk	10	(6)
2010	FC Gold Pride	8	(1)
2010	Stabæk	8	(1)
2011–2013	Vålerenga	43	(12)
2014	Stabæk	5	(1)
2015–2017	Kolbotn	52	(11)
2020	Kolbotn	0	(0)

International career^{‡}
1996–1997	Norway U-16	11	(4)
1998–1999	Norway U-18	3	(1)
1998	Norway U-21	1	(0)
1998–2015	Norway	183	(55)
Medal record
Women's football
Representing Norway
Olympic Games
Gold medal – first place	2000 Sydney	Team
UEFA Women's Championship
Silver medal – second place	2005 England	Team
Silver medal – second place	2013 Sweden	Team
- * Club domestic league appearances and goals as of 6 June 2017 ‡ National team caps and goals as of 23 June 2015

Solveig Ingersdatter Gulbrandsen (born 12 January 1981) is a Norwegian former footballer played a midfielder. At club level she has previously represented Kolbotn, FC Gold Pride, Vålerenga Fotball Damer and Stabæk. With the Norwegian national team Gulbrandsen accrued 183 caps, scored 55 goals and won the 2000 Summer Olympics.

== Club career ==
Hailing from Oppegård Municipality (to the southeast of Oslo), Gulbrandsen started her career for Kolbotn. Her team became the Norwegian Cup holders after winning the Cup Final in November 2007.

In December 2008 Gulbrandsen announced her transfer to Stabæk Fotball Kvinner, formed from the bankrupt Asker FK and other players.

On 10 December 2009 FC Gold Pride in Santa Clara, California, playing in the WPS league, announced that Gulbrandsen had signed a contract to play and to take part in coaching and education, starting in March 2010. However, on 7 July 2010, FC Gold Pride announced that Gulbrandsen would be returning to Norway and Stabæk FK, effective after the club's 17 July match against Philadelphia. Gulbrandsen cited a desire to begin a transition to a post-soccer career in Norway for her decision.

After a successful autumn season with Stabæk in 2010 she announced her retirement as a football player and joined the Oslo club Vålerenga as an assistant trainer. She also announced that she was expecting her second child.

A highlight video of Gulbrandsen's last league match, in which she assisted two goals and Stabæk won the Toppserien league title, can be seen on line from the Norwegian channel TV 2. She retired from her club side Stabæk Fotball Kvinner after the 2010 season.

In the latter half of the 2011 season Gulbrandsen played some matches as a substitute for the first-division club Vålerenga, and was later hired as the team's assistant player coach. During 2012 and 2013 she played regularly for Vålerenga, who had been promoted into the Toppserien.

After another brief period of retirement, 33-year-old Gulbrandsen rejoined Stabæk as a player in September 2014. She had been working as a television pundit for TV 2 but agreed to help out her former team who had an injury crisis.

== International career ==
In 1998 Gulbrandsen made her debut for the Norwegian National Team and made regular appearances until the end of 2010. She won a gold medal with the Norwegian national team in the 2000 Summer Olympics. In 2005 Norway reached the Final of the 2005 UEFA Women's Championship by beating Sweden 3–2, with Gulbrandsen scoring two goals and earning a yellow card for hoisting her shirt over her head after scoring the first goal.

Gulbrandsen took part in the FIFA Women's World Cup 2007 tournament in China, her third such tournament, when Norway achieved fourth place behind Germany, Brazil and the USA. On 9 June 2008, she was named to the Norwegian roster for the 2008 Summer Olympics that was held in Beijing, China. Norway advanced to the quarter-finals where they lost to Brazil. Gulbrandsen was hit in a wrist early in the match but continued playing and discovered only afterwards that a bone had been broken.

Gulbrandsen was selected for Norway's team in the UEFA Women's Euro 2009 played in Finland. The team survived the group stage to beat Sweden 3–1 in the quarter-final, losing to Germany 3–1 in the semifinal. At the end of the tournament she announced it would be her last championship but she would continue playing to the end of the season at least. In October 2009 she announced that she had decided with her family to continue playing for another season.

Veteran national coach Even Pellerud selected Gulbrandsen in Norway's squad for UEFA Women's Euro 2013 in Sweden. In the final at Friends Arena, she had a second half penalty kick saved by Germany's goalkeeper Nadine Angerer. Anja Mittag's goal gave the Germans their sixth successive title.

== International goals ==
No.	Date	Venue	Opponent	Score	Result	Competition
1.	23 June 1999	Landover, United States	Canada	7–1	7–1	1999 FIFA Women's World Cup
2.	7 May 2000	Moss, Norway	Portugal	1–0	5–0	UEFA Women's Euro 2001 qualifying
3.	7 May 2000	Moss, Norway	Portugal	2–0	5–0	UEFA Women's Euro 2001 qualifying
4.	4 June 2000	Moss, Norway	England	4–0	8–0	UEFA Women's Euro 2001 qualifying
5.	24 June 2000	Interlaken, Switzerland	Switzerland	1–0	1–0	UEFA Women's Euro 2001 qualifying
6.	8 September 2001	Lillestrøm, Norway	Ukraine	2–0	4–0	2003 FIFA Women's World Cup qualification
7.	11 September 2001	Kongsvinger, Norway	Czech Republic	3–0	5–0	2003 FIFA Women's World Cup qualification
8.	25 January 2002	Guangzhou, China	China	2–0	3–0	2002 Four Nations Tournament
9.	27 January 2002	Guangzhou, China	Germany	1–0	1–3	2002 Four Nations Tournament
10.	3 March 2002	Ferreiras, Portugal	Sweden	3–3	3–3	2002 Algarve Cup
11.	5 March 2002	Lagos, Portugal	United States	3–2	3–2	2002 Algarve Cup
12.	24 March 2002	Slaný, Czech Republic	Czech Republic	2–1	5–1	2003 FIFA Women's World Cup qualification
13.	12 May 2002	Boryspil, Ukraine	Ukraine	1–0	1–1	2003 FIFA Women's World Cup qualification
14.	11 May 2003	Kristiansand, Norway	Belgium	1–0	6–0	UEFA Women's Euro 2005 qualifying
15.	23 September 2003	Foxborough, United States	South Korea	1–0	7–1	2003 FIFA Women's World Cup
16.	7 March 2004	Strombeek-Bever, Belgium	Belgium	6–1	6–1	UEFA Women's Euro 2005 qualifying
17.	14 March 2004	Guia, Portugal	Finland	4–?	4–1	2004 Algarve Cup
18.	10 November 2004	Reykjavík, Iceland	Iceland	1–0	7–2	UEFA Women's Euro 2005 qualifying
19.	10 November 2004	Reykjavík, Iceland	Iceland	3–0	7–2	UEFA Women's Euro 2005 qualifying
20.	10 November 2004	Reykjavík, Iceland	Iceland	6–0	7–2	UEFA Women's Euro 2005 qualifying
21.	12 June 2005	Preston, England	Italy	3–1	5–3	UEFA Women's Euro 2005
22.	16 June 2005	Warrington, England	Sweden	1–0	3–2 (a.e.t.)	UEFA Women's Euro 2005
23.	16 June 2005	Warrington, England	Sweden	3–2	3–2 (a.e.t.)	UEFA Women's Euro 2005
24.	24 September 2005	Lazarevac, Serbia	Serbia	1–0	4–0	2007 FIFA Women's World Cup qualification
25.	24 September 2005	Lazarevac, Serbia	Serbia	4–0	4–0	2007 FIFA Women's World Cup qualification
26.	17 June 2007	Ramat Gan, Israel	Israel	1–0	3–0	UEFA Women's Euro 2009 qualifying
27.	17 June 2007	Ramat Gan, Israel	Israel	2–0	3–0	UEFA Women's Euro 2009 qualifying
28.	21 June 2007	Lillestrøm, Norway	Austria	1–0	3–0	UEFA Women's Euro 2009 qualifying
29.	27 October 2007	Stavanger, Norway	Russia	2–0	3–0	UEFA Women's Euro 2009 qualifying
30.	3 May 2008	Kristiansand, Norway	Israel	2–0	7–0	UEFA Women's Euro 2009 qualifying
31.	3 May 2008	Kristiansand, Norway	Israel	7–0	7–0	UEFA Women's Euro 2009 qualifying
32.	7 May 2008	Stavanger, Norway	Poland	2–0	3–0	UEFA Women's Euro 2009 qualifying
33.	21 June 2008	Amstetten, Austria	Austria	2–0	4–0	UEFA Women's Euro 2009 qualifying
34.	25 June 2008	Kutno, Poland	Poland	1–0	3–0	UEFA Women's Euro 2009 qualifying
35.	11 March 2009	Loulé, Portugal	Austria	2–0	2–0	2009 Algarve Cup
36.	24 October 2009	Bærum, Norway	Netherlands	2–0	3–0	2011 FIFA Women's World Cup qualification
37.	1 March 2010	Silves, Portugal	Iceland	1–0	3–2	2010 Algarve Cup
38.	1 March 2010	Silves, Portugal	Iceland	2–1	3–2	2010 Algarve Cup
39.	30 March 2010	Grodno, Belarus	Belarus	5–0	5–0	2011 FIFA Women's World Cup qualification
40.	21 August 2010	Senec, Slovakia	Slovakia	2–0	4–0	2011 FIFA Women's World Cup qualification
41.	25 August 2010	Prilep, North Macedonia	North Macedonia	6–0	7–0	2011 FIFA Women's World Cup qualification
42.	15 September 2010	Bærum, Norway	Ukraine	2–0	2–0	2011 FIFA Women's World Cup qualification
43.	14 July 2013	Kalmar, Sweden	Netherlands	1–0	1–0	UEFA Women's Euro 2013
44.	22 July 2013	Kalmar, Sweden	Spain	1–0	3–1	UEFA Women's Euro 2013
45.	26 October 2013	Sarpsborg, Norway	Albania	5–0	7–0	2015 FIFA Women's World Cup qualification
46.	11 March 2015	Albufeira, Portugal	Denmark	1–0	5–2	2015 Algarve Cup
47.	11 March 2015	Albufeira, Portugal	Denmark	2–0	5–2	2015 Algarve Cup
48.	11 March 2015	Albufeira, Portugal	Denmark	3–0	5–2	2015 Algarve Cup
49.	15 June 2015	Moncton, Canada	Ivory Coast	3–0	3–1	2015 FIFA Women's World Cup
50.	22 June 2015	Ottawa, Canada	England	1–0	1–2	2015 FIFA Women's World Cup

== Personal life ==
Gulbrandsen is the daughter of former Norway international footballer Terje Gulbrandsen and Inger Elise Johansen, a former Norwegian champion in Rhythmic Gymnastics. She is married to Espen Andreassen, a former football trainer in Kolbotn women's football club. On 8 June 2006 Solveig Gulbrandsen gave birth to her first child, a son named Theodor. Her second child was born on 19 June 2011, a daughter named Lilly. She is unrelated to the other footballer Ragnhild Gulbrandsen.

== Honours ==
=== Club ===
- Toppserien: Winner 2002, 2005, 2006, 2010
- Norwegian Women's Cup: Winner 2007

=== Country ===
Norway

- 1999 FIFA Women's World Cup: Fourth place
- 2003 FIFA Women's World Cup: Quarter-final
- 2007 FIFA Women's World Cup: Fourth place
- 2015 FIFA Women's World Cup: Round of 16
- 2000 Summer Olympics in Sydney: Gold
- 2008 Summer Olympics in Beijing: Quarter-final
- UEFA Women's Euro 2001: Semi-finals
- UEFA Women's Euro 2005: Runners-up
- UEFA Women's Euro 2009: Semi-finals
- UEFA Women's Euro 2013: Runners-up

=== Individual ===
- UEFA Women's Championship All-Star Team: 2013

== See also ==
- List of women's footballers with 100 or more international caps
