= Røa IL =

Norwegian sports club

Røa
- Full name: Røa Idrettslag
- Nicknames: Dynamite Girls (women); Herrelaget (men)
- Founded: 11 November 1900; 126 years ago
- Ground: Røa kunstgress, Oslo
- Manager: Fredrik Sæland
- League: Toppserien
- 2026: Toppserien, 10th of 12 (relegated)
Home colours	Away colours

Røa IL is a Norwegian sports club from Røa in the borough of Vestre Aker, Oslo. It was founded on 11 November 1900, and has sections for football, gymnastics, bandy, and cross-country skiing. Football, bandy, and Nordic skiing have been dominant in Røa. In bandy, the team has twice made it to the finals in the Norwegian cup, losing both to arch-rivals Stabæk. In skiing, the two foremost names are Olav Hansson, world champion team large hill ski jumping in the 1982 World Ski Championships and Martin Johnsrud Sundby, a Norwegian national team cross-country skier who won the FIS Cross-Country World Cup and the Tour de Ski in 2013–14.

The biggest success so far is probably the women's football team. While Røa was open for women participating in handball and gymnastics, football was frowned upon for quite some time. Women's football was started outside the club by Røa legend Ole Bjørn Edner and his daughter Kristine with friends. The team was finally recognized when they started winning the Norway Cup in 1993. The team started in the fourth tier in 1994, and spent two years in each tier before they qualified for the first tier, Toppserien, in 2000. As the bandy team were relegated the same season, the football team took over as the main success. In an attempt to brand the team, a former bandy player came up with the nickname "Dynamite Girls", which has stuck since.

Røa's first season in Toppserien was a fierce battle to avoid relegation. In the last match the team saw it through. The next two seasons were a dramatic improvement, the team finished fourth (out of ten) both times. In 2004 Røa won both league and cup. After an abysmal 2005 season, they continued their dominance with a cup victory in 2006, a league victory in 2007, and a Double in 2008 and 2009. With in all eight trophies, Røa is the third most successful team in women's football in Norway (joint with Sprint-Jeløy if one counts the proto-national league from 1984.1986).

The team has a host of current and former national team players. Among them are the 2007 World Cup players Siri Nordby (captain), Guro Knutsen Mienna, Lene Mykjåland, Marie Knutsen and Marit Fiane Christensen.

The men's football team currently plays in the Third Division (fourth tier).

== List of seasons ==
Season		Pos.	Pl.	W	D	L	GS	GA	P	Cup
2001	Toppserien	7	18	3	3	12	18	51	12	Quarter-final
2002	Toppserien	4	18	9	4	5	47	32	31	Semi-final
2003	Toppserien	4	18	7	6	5	23	27	27	Quarter-final
2004	Toppserien	1	18	14	2	2	39	9	44	Winner
2005	Toppserien	6	18	9	1	8	35	28	28	Semi-final
2006	Toppserien	3	18	12	3	3	69	24	39	Winner
2007	Toppserien	1	22	17	2	3	63	24	53	Semi-final
2008	Toppserien	1	22	20	1	1	90	10	61	Winner
2009	Toppserien	1	22	18	2	2	64	16	56	Winner
2010	Toppserien	2	22	15	3	4	56	33	48	Winner
2011	Toppserien	1	22	18	0	4	76	18	54	Final
2012	Toppserien	4	22	15	4	3	58	19	47	Final
2013	Toppserien	8	22	7	7	8	25	33	28	Quarter-final
2014	Toppserien	6	22	9	5	8	36	27	32	Semi-final
2015	Toppserien	3	22	10	8	4	32	24	38	Quarter-final
2016	Toppserien	5	22	9	6	7	34	31	33	Final
2017	Toppserien	5	22	11	4	7	42	28	37	Third round
2018	Toppserien	7	22	10	2	10	42	42	31	Semi-final
2019	Toppserien	6	22	7	8	7	40	35	29	Quarter-final
2020	Toppserien	10	18	3	3	12	15	33	12	Quarter-final
2021	1. divisjon	1	18	13	5	0	54	6	44	Third round
2022	Toppserien	10	18	0	3	15	9	47	3	3rd round
2022	Toppserien	5	7	2	2	3	12	11	8	3rd round
2023	Toppserien	7	27	6	9	12	33	43	27	4th round
2024	Toppserien	7	27	9	2	16	22	37	29	Semi-final
2025	Toppserien	9	27	4	7	16	23	52	19	Quarter-final
2026	Toppserien	10	22	4	5	13	20	46	17	3rd round

== First team squad ==
As of 6 February 2024

Note: Flags indicate national team as defined under FIFA eligibility rules; some limited exceptions apply. Players may hold more than one non-FIFA nationality.

No.	Pos.	Nation	Player
1	GK	SWE	Louise Högrell
2	DF	NOR	Hanna Rake Ellingsen
3	DF	NOR	Sarah Suphellen
4	DF	NOR	Synne Masdal
5	DF	NOR	Jenny Storaker Skogmo
7	MF	NOR	Oline Brekke Fuglem
8	MF	NOR	Martine Humlestøl Midtbø
9	FW	NOR	Julie Hoff Klæbo
11	FW	NOR	Rakel Renolen
13	MF	NOR	Milla Baumeler Isaksen
14	MF	NOR	Ragne Hagen Svastuen

No.	Pos.	Nation	Player
15	DF	NOR	Mia Hambro Svendsen
16	MF	NOR	Cassandra Bogere
17	MF	NOR	Maja Svensson Martinsen
18	MF	NOR	Solveig Engås
19	MF	NOR	Kaja Brendengen Rosenlund
20	FW	NOR	Malene Wik Alfredsen
21	MF	NOR	Siw Døvle
22	FW	NOR	Mina Bell Folland
25	GK	NOR	Hildegunn Sævik
30	FW	TTO	Anya De Courcy
33	FW	NOR	Irene Castillo Didriksen

== European history ==
Røa has participated in five seasons of UEFA competitions with their best result reaching the quarter-finals in 2009/10 losing in those to Turbine Potsdam, the eventual champion.

UEFA Women's Cup

- 2005/06: First qualifying round
- 2008/09: Second qualifying round

UEFA Women's Champions League

- 2009/10: Quarter-finals
- 2010/11: Round of 16
- 2012/13: Round of 16
