= Kjersti Thun =

Norwegian footballer (born 1974)

Medal record

Women's football

Representing Norway

Olympic Games
Bronze medal – third place	1996 Atlanta	Team

Kjersti Anita Thun (born 18 June 1974) is a Norwegian former soccer player. Thun played 12 games and scored one goal for Norway, and was on the team that took bronze at the 1996 Summer Olympics in Atlanta.

At club level, she played for the Asker and Konnerud. She was champion with Asker in 2000 and scored a goal in the finals against the Administrator, and in 2005 with two goals in the final against Team Stream. She was also the series' top scorer with Asker in 1999.
