= Heidi Pedersen =

Norwegian footballer (born 1979)

Personal information
- Date of birth: 19 November 1979 (age 46)
- Position: Forward

Youth career
- Clausenengen

Senior career*
Years	Team	Apps	(Gls)
1998–2007	Trondheims-Ørn		
2014–2017	Nardo		

International career^{‡}
1995–1996	Norway u-16	17	(14)
1998	Norway u-18	3	(1)
1997	Norway u-20	6	(0)
1998–2003	Norway u-21	28	(11)
2001–2005	Norway	15	(5)
- * Club domestic league appearances and goals as of 7 November 2019 ‡ National team caps and goals as of 7 November 2019

Heidi Pedersen (born 19 November 1979) is a retired Norwegian football striker.

She played youth football for Clausenengen FK when first called up to Norway's national youth team. She made her senior debut for Trondheims-Ørn in 1998, playing ten seasons.

She was capped fifteen times and scored five times for the Norway women's national football team.
