= Ingrid Camilla Fosse Sæthre =

Norwegian footballer (born 1978)

Personal information
- Date of birth: 19 January 1978 (age 48)
- Position: Forward

Senior career*
Years	Team	Apps	(Gls)
–2006	Arna-Bjørnar		
2010–2011	Stabæk	15	(3)

International career
1997	Norway U20	6	(4)
1998–2000	Norway U21	10	(5)
1998–2003	Norway	17	(3)
- * Club domestic league appearances and goals

Ingrid Camilla Fosse Sæthre (born 19 January 1978) is a Norwegian footballer who played as a forward for the Norway national team. She was part of the team at the 2003 FIFA Women's World Cup. At club level she played for Arna-Bjørnar, retiring in 2006. She made a comeback for Stabæk in 2010. Sæthre made 15 appearances for the club from 2010 to 2011 and scored three goals.

== Personal life ==
Fosse Sæthre is married to former footballer Lise Klaveness; they have three children.

== Honors ==
Stabæk

- Toppserien: 2010
