= IF Fløya =

Norwegian football club

- Full name: Idrettsforeningen Fløya
- Founded: 22 June 1922; 104 years ago
- Ground: Fløyabanen, Tromsø
- Chairman: Roger Johansen
- Manager: Mikael Raimo Johnsen (men)
- League: 1. divisjon (women); 3. divisjon (men)
- 2021 2024: 1. divisjon, 5th (women); 3. divisjon, 2nd (men)
Home colours	Away colours

Idrettsforeningen Fløya is a Norwegian football club from the city of Tromsø. The club was founded on 22 June 1922 and named after the Fløya mountain which overlooks Tromsø centre.

The women's team has got two third-place finishes in Toppserien, in 2004 and 2005, as its best ever achievements. On 16 December 2020, the women's team merged with Tromsø IL under the name of TIL 2020. The new name was taken into effect starting from the 2022 season.

The men's team plays in the Norwegian Third Division, the fourth tier in the Norwegian football league system. The famous Norwegian striker Rune Lange started his career in IF Fløya.

== Recent seasons ==
=== Women's seasons ===
Season		Pos.	Pl.	W	D	L	GS	GA	P	Cup	Notes
2005	Toppserien	3	18	10	3	5	49	27	33	Quarter-final	
2006	Toppserien	7	18	4	2	12	24	57	14	Semi-final	
2007	Toppserien	9	22	7	4	11	36	52	25	Quarter-final	
2008	Toppserien	7	22	9	3	10	41	39	30	Quarter-final	
2009	Toppserien	8	22	7	4	11	36	37	25	Quarter-final	
2010	Toppserien	↓ 12	22	1	3	18	15	66	6	Quarter-final	Relegated
2011	1. divisjon	3	20	10	5	5	43	26	35	1st round	
2012	1. divisjon	6	22	11	1	10	44	37	34	3rd round	
2013	1. divisjon	6	20	9	2	9	50	43	29	3rd round	
2014	1. divisjon	↓ 12	22	1	6	15	18	56	9	2nd round	Relegated
2015	2. divisjon	↑ 1	14	12	1	1	61	7	37	2nd round	Promoted
2016	1. divisjon	4	22	12	3	7	55	33	39	3rd round	
2017	1. divisjon	7	22	8	4	10	37	36	28	2nd round	
2018	1. divisjon	7	22	8	5	9	37	40	29	3rd round	
2019	1. divisjon	1	22	15	2	5	62	30	47	3rd round	
2020	1. divisjon	9	18	1	3	14	19	55	6	1st round	
2021	1. divisjon	5	18	7	3	8	31	27	24	Quarter-final	

=== Men's seasons ===
Season		Pos.	Pl.	W	D	L	GS	GA	P	Cup	Notes
2011	3. divisjon	5	22	11	2	9	62	58	35	First round	
2012	3. divisjon	2	22	16	2	4	103	28	50	Second qual. round	
2013	3. divisjon	2	22	15	2	5	68	30	47	Second round	
2014	3. divisjon	2	22	15	4	3	63	23	49	First round	
2015	3. divisjon	3	22	14	1	7	59	32	43	Second round	
2016	3. divisjon	1	22	18	2	2	82	23	56	First round	
2017	3. divisjon	8	26	9	8	9	42	39	36	Third round	
2018	3. divisjon	4	26	14	5	7	56	35	47	First round	
2019	3. divisjon	↑ 1	26	18	2	6	75	40	56	Second round	Promoted
2020	2. divisjon	14	13	0	1	12	10	54	1	Cancelled	
2021	2. divisjon	↓ 13	26	2	8	16	29	72	14	Second round	Relegated
2022	3. divisjon	3	26	15	4	7	58	35	49		
2023	3. divisjon	7	26	7	10	9	35	36	31		
2024	3. divisjon	↓ 12	26	6	4	16	44	61	22		Relegated
2025	4. divisjon	↑ 1	26								Promoted
2026	3. divisjon	↑ 1	26	18	3	5	81	36	57		Promoted

== Honours ==
- Men
  - Northern Norwegian Cup: 1936
- Women
  - Toppserien bronze: 2004, 2005
