= Asker Fotball =

Association football club

Asker
- Full name: Asker Fotball
- Founded: 1889; 137 years ago
- Ground: Føyka Stadion, Asker
- Capacity: 2,000
- Chairman: Tormod Ruud
- Head coach: Rolf Magnus Czeremuga Bredal
- League: 2. divisjon
- 2024: 3. divisjon, group 3, 1st of 14 (promoted)
Home colours	Away colours

Asker Fotball is the football department of Norwegian sports club Asker SK from Asker.

The women's football team is one of the most successful clubs ever in Norway, with six top flight championships and five cup championships. Due to financial difficulties at the end of 2008, the team's licence to play in the Toppserien was revoked; the team members then joined Stabæk IF's football group, Stabæk Fotball, which set up a new women's team. NFF gave Asker's place in the Toppserien to Stabæk Fotball. Asker's second team became Asker's first team, playing in the 2. divisjon, and they now have a recruiting arrangement with Stabæk Fotball.

The men's team currently play in the 2. divisjon, the third tier of the Norwegian football league system.

== History ==
=== Best achievements ===
The men's team played in the Norwegian top flight between 1951 and 1959. In 1951 they were runners-up in the Norwegian cup.

The women's team won all its league matches in the 1998 season. The men's division did the same thing in 2005, though in the 3. divisjon.

=== Match-fixing allegations ===
On 13 July 2012, four players – one of them from Asker – were arrested by police due to match-fixing allegations in games involving Aker and Follo FK. Asker's 7–1 loss to Frigg was deemed suspicious because of the odd scoreline and the substantial bets placed on the game.

== Recent history ==
=== Men's team ===
Season		Pos.	Pl.	W	D	L	GS	GA	P	Cup	Notes
2001	2. divisjon, section 1	↓ 12	26	8	5	13	42	56	29	First round	Relegated to 3. divisjon
2002	3. divisjon, section 8	2	22	15	3	4	80	32	48		
2003	3. divisjon, section 1	1	22	15	2	5	50	23	47	First round	Lost playoffs for promotion
2004	3. divisjon, section 8	3	22	14	3	5	54	26	45	First round	
2005	3. divisjon, section 4	1	20	20	0	0	79	10	60	First round	Lost playoffs for promotion
2006	3. divisjon, section 8	↑ 1	22	20	0	2	103	26	60	First round	Promoted to 2. divisjon
2007	2. divisjon, section 2	2	26	15	7	4	72	33	52	First round	
2008	2. divisjon, section 4	6	26	14	2	10	58	52	44	Third round	
2009	2. divisjon, section 4	3	26	15	4	7	63	31	49	Third round	
2010	2. divisjon, section 1	↑ 1	26	17	6	3	71	30	57	Second round	Promoted to 1. divisjon
2011	1. divisjon	↓ 13	30	9	7	14	38	56	34	Third round	Relegated to 2. divisjon
2012	2. divisjon, section 4	4	26	14	5	7	54	36	47	Fourth round	
2013	2. divisjon, section 1	2	26	17	5	4	80	37	56	Third round	
2014	2. divisjon, section 1	↓ 13	26	5	6	15	36	50	21	Second round	Relegated to 3. divisjon
2015	3. divisjon, section 2	↑ 1	26	24	2	0	151	19	74	First round	Promoted to 2. divisjon
2016	2. divisjon, section 4	5	26	13	4	9	52	44	43	Third round	
2017	2. divisjon, section 1	3	26	13	8	5	50	36	47	Second round	
2018	2. divisjon, section 1	4	26	14	3	9	53	31	45	Second round	
2019	2. divisjon, section 2	4	26	13	7	6	39	28	46	Second round	
2020	2. divisjon, section 2	2	19	10	7	2	38	21	37	Cancelled	Lost playoffs for promotion
2021	2. divisjon, section 1	3	26	15	4	7	60	37	49	First round	
2022	2. divisjon, section 2	↓ 13	26	6	6	14	32	47	24	First round	Relegated to 3. divisjon
2023	3. divisjon, section 6	4	26	14	1	11	58	40	43		
2024	3. divisjon, section 3	↑ 1	26	20	2	4	82	39	62		Promoted to 2. divisjon
2025	2. divisjon, section 2	↓ 14	26	3	5	18	32	68	14		Relegated to 3. divisjon
2026	3. divisjon, section 1	↑ 1	26								Promoted to 2. divisjon

=== Women's team ===
Season		Pos.	Pl.	W	D	L	GS	GA	P	Cup	Notes
2001	Toppserien	4	18	11	2	5	59	26	35	Final	
2002	Toppserien	2	18	14	2	2	60	9	47	Quarterfinal	
2003	Toppserien	3	18	12	3	3	54	20	39	Quarterfinal	
2004	Toppserien	4	18	9	4	5	37	23	31	Final	
2005	Toppserien	↓ 7	18	7	3	8	34	30	24	Winners	Relegated because their license was revoked
2006	1. divisjon	↑ 1	18	16	0	2	110	13	48	Final	Promoted to Toppserien
2007	Toppserien	3	22	15	5	2	68	18	50	Final	
2008	Toppserien	3	22	14	3	5	53	26	45	Semifinal	Team folded
