= FK Larvik =

Larvik
- Full name: Fotballklubben Larvik
- Founded: 1997
- Dissolved: 2010
- Ground: Bergeskogen idrettspark, Larvik
- Capacity: N/A
Home colours	Away colours

FK Larvik was a Norwegian women's football club from Larvik. It was founded in 1997 through a merger of the women's football sections of Nanset IF and Halsen IF.

The senior team played in the Toppserien, the highest tier of Norwegian women's football, as late as in 2008. In March 2010, ahead of the 2010 season, the club dissolved after one year in the First Division and the club went defunct.
