= Kolbotn Fotball =

Norwegian football team

- Full name: Kolbotn Fotball
- Founded: 1916; 110 years ago
- Ground: Sofiemyr stadion Oppegård
- Capacity: 400
- Sports Leader: Knut Norem
- League: Toppserien
- 2025: Toppserien, 10th of 10 (relegatez)
- Website: https://kolbotnkvinnefotball.no/
Home colours	Away colours

Kolbotn IL Fotball is a sub-section under the sports club Kolbotn IL from Kolbotn, Norway. The club started football in 1916 and organized football as a semi-autonomous sub-section in 1960.

The women's team plays in Toppserien and is one of the most successful in Norway with three league titles (2002, 2005 and 2006) and one cup title (2007).

The men's team resides in the 4. divisjon (fifth tier of the Norwegian football league system), after being relegated from the 3. divisjon in 2011 and played in the 2. divisjon as late as 1993.

== Recent history ==
Season		Pos.	Pl.	W	D	L	GS	GA	P	Cup	Notes
2006	TS	1	18	13	3	2	76	17	42	quarter-final	
2007	TS	2	22	16	2	4	71	18	50	winner	
2008	TS	4	22	12	6	4	51	23	42	semi-final	
2009	TS	3	22	16	2	4	51	25	50	quarter-final	
2010	TS	3	22	15	2	5	49	12	47	quarter-final	
2011	TS	3	22	16	3	3	59	26	51	semi-final	
2012	TS	5	22	9	7	6	36	35	34	quarter-final	
2013	TS	6	22	9	4	9	39	42	31	3rd round	
2014	TS	4	22	13	0	9	41	32	39	quarter-final	
2015	TS	5	22	9	5	8	45	28	32	quarter-final	
2016	TS	4	22	12	4	6	32	17	40	semi-final	
2017	TS	10	22	4	3	15	17	43	15	3rd round	
2018	TS	5	22	11	6	5	34	35	39	quarter-final	
2019	TS	8	22	7	6	9	35	39	27	quarter-final	
2020	TS	9	18	2	7	9	18	29	13	1st round	
2021	TS	6	18	6	2	10	21	31	20	quarter-final	
2022	TS	↓ 8	18	8	2	8	27	22	26	Semi-final	Relegated
2022	TS	↓ 8	7	1	2	4	8	13	5	Semi-final	Relegated
2023	1D	↑ 1	24	18	4	2	48	13	58	quarter-final	Promoted
2024	TS	8	27	7	5	15	28	55	26	3rd round	
2025	TS	↓ 10	27	5	2	20	27	68	17	3rd round	Relegated

== Achievements ==
=== Women's football ===
- Toppserien
  - Champions (3): 2002, 2005, 2006
  - Runners-up (3): 2001, 2003, 2007
  - Third (4): 2000, 2009, 2010, 2011
- Norwegian Women's Cup
  - Winners (1): 2007
  - Runners-up (2): 1998, 2003
- UEFA Competitions
  - Semi-final in UEFA Women's Cup: 2006 (defeating 1. FFC Frankfurt)

== Players ==
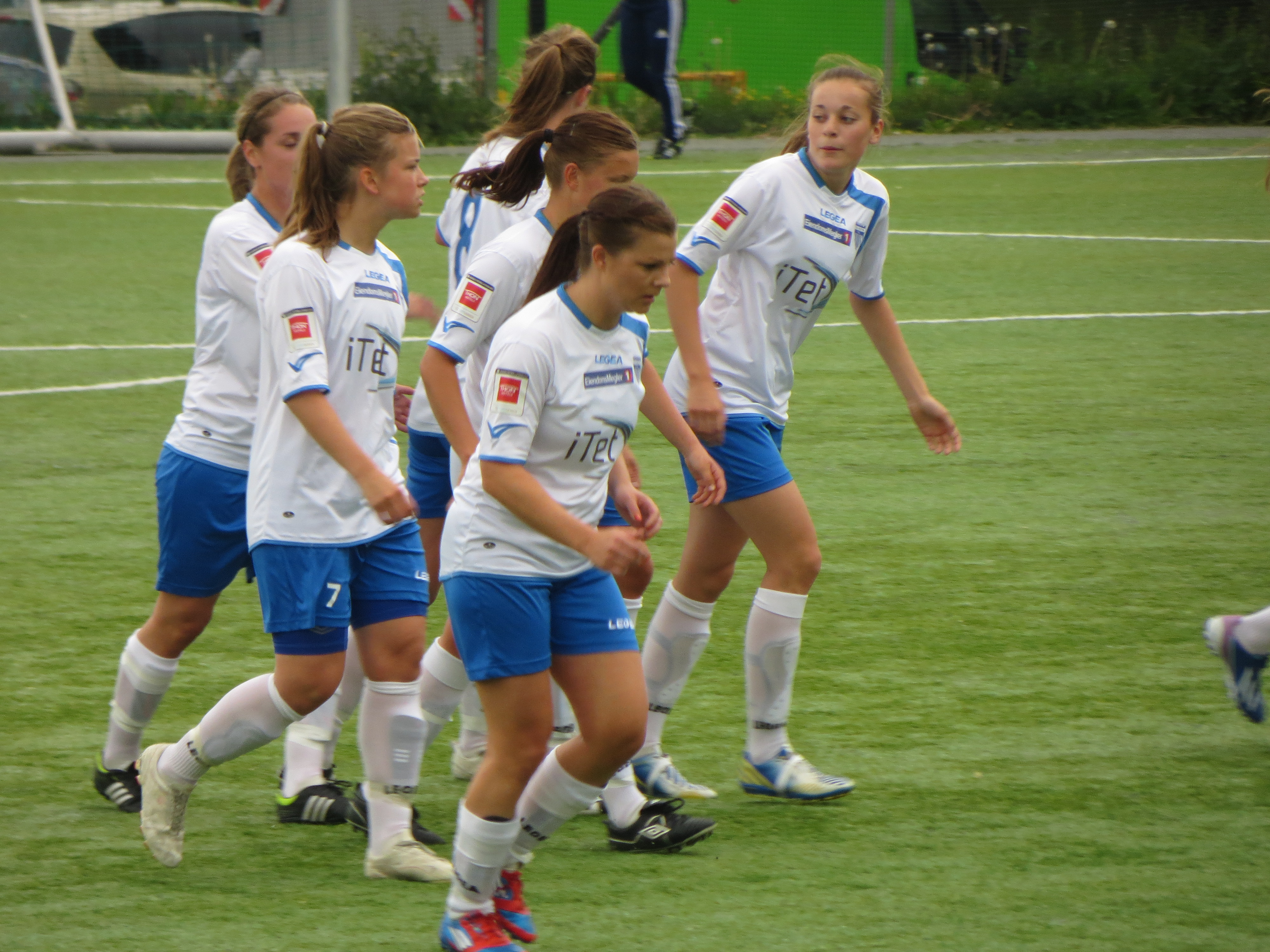
Kolbotn players in June 2013

=== Current squad ===
As of 24 June 2025.

Note: Flags indicate national team as defined under FIFA eligibility rules; some limited exceptions apply. Players may hold more than one non-FIFA nationality.

No.	Pos.	Nation	Player
1	GK	NOR	Savanna Mary-Anne Duffy
2	DF	NOR	Josefine Thorsnes Lefdal
3	DF	NOR	Ebba Lovisa Niss
4	DF	NOR	Anna Bure Pettersen
5	DF	NOR	Camilla Huseby (captain)
6	MF	NZL	Olivia Chance
7	MF	NOR	Camilla Linberg
8	MF	NOR	Sigrid Gamst
9	MF	NOR	Linn Huseby
10	FW	JPN	Kanna Matsuhisa
11	DF	NOR	Lea Brandstadmoen Ellingsen
12	GK	NOR	Margaux Batt Lægreid
14	MF	NOR	Aida Berg

No.	Pos.	Nation	Player
15	DF	NOR	Ingrid Linnea Haugen
16	MF	NOR	Iselin Brualøkken
17	FW	NOR	Nadia Tahirukaj
18	FW	NOR	Amalie Lia
20	MF	NOR	Liliana Malloul
21	DF	NOR	Malin Stranne Rønningen
23	FW	NOR	Tiril Haga
25	DF	NOR	Inger Helene Urberg
28	FW	NOR	Linea Kessler-Hansen
34	MF	NOR	Maiken Enge-Kristiansen
40	MF	NOR	Eva Sellevoll
—	FW	NZL	Jacqui Hand

=== Former players ===
Ada Hegerberg, the first ever recipient of the Ballon d'Or Féminin in 2018, played for Kolbotn in 2010 and 2011.
