= 2017–18 UEFA Women's Champions League knockout phase =

Tournament details
- Dates: 4 October 2017 – 24 May 2018
- Teams: 32 (from 22 associations)

Tournament statistics
- Matches played: 61
- Goals scored: 211 (3.46 per match)
- Attendance: 146,361 (2,399 per match)
- Top scorer: Ada Hegerberg (15 goals)

The 2017–18 UEFA Women's Champions League knockout phase began on 4 October 2017 and ended on 24 May 2018 with the final at the Valeriy Lobanovskyi Dynamo Stadium in Kyiv, Ukraine, to decide the champions of the 2017–18 UEFA Women's Champions League. A total of 32 teams competed in the knockout phase.

Times from 29 October 2017 up to 24 March 2018 (both legs of round of 16 and first legs of quarter-finals) are CET (UTC+1), all other times are CEST (UTC+2).

== Round and draw dates ==
The schedule of the knockout phase was as follows (all draws are held at the UEFA headquarters in Nyon, Switzerland).

Round	Draw	First leg	Second leg
Round of 32	1 September 2017	4–5 October 2017	11–12 October 2017
Round of 16	16 October 2017	8–9 November 2017	15–16 November 2017
Quarter-finals	24 November 2017	21–22 March 2018	28–29 March 2018
Semi-finals	24 November 2017	21–22 April 2018	28–29 April 2018
Final	24 November 2017	24 May 2018 at Valeriy Lobanovskyi Dynamo Stadium, Kyiv	

== Format ==
The knockout phase involved 32 teams: 21 teams which received a bye, and the 11 teams which advanced from the qualifying round (ten group winners and the best runners-up). In the knockout phase, teams played against each other over two legs on a home-and-away basis, except for the one-match final. If the aggregate score was tied after full time of the second leg, the away goals rule was used to decide the winners. If still tied, extra time is played. The away goals rule was again used after extra time, i.e. if there are goals scored during extra time and the aggregate score was still tied after extra time, the away team of the second leg advanced by virtue of more away goals scored. If no goals were scored during extra time, the match was decided by penalty shoot-out. In the final, which was played as a single match, if the score was tied after full time, extra time was played, followed by penalty shoot-out if the score was still tied after extra time.

The mechanism of the draws for each round is as follows:

- In the draw for the round of 32, the sixteen teams with the highest UEFA club coefficients were seeded (with the title holders being the automatic top seed), and the other sixteen teams are unseeded. The seeded teams are drawn against the unseeded teams, with the seeded teams hosting the second leg. Teams from the same association or the same qualifying round group cannot be drawn against each other.
- In the draw for the round of 16, the eight teams with the highest UEFA club coefficients are seeded (with the title holders being the automatic top seed should they qualify), and the other eight teams are unseeded. The seeded teams are drawn against the unseeded teams, with the order of legs decided by draw. Teams from the same association cannot be drawn against each other.
- In the draws for the quarter-finals and semi-finals, there are no seedings, and teams from the same association can be drawn against each other. As the draws for the quarter-finals and semi-finals are held together before the quarter-finals are played, the identity of the teams in the semi-finals are not known at the time of the draw. A draw is also held to determine the "home" team for the final (for administrative purposes as it is played at a neutral venue).

== Qualified teams ==
Below are the 32 teams which participated in the knockout phase (with their 2017 UEFA club coefficients, which took into account their performance in European competitions from 2012–13 to 2016–17 plus 33% of their association coefficient from the same time span).

Bye to round of 32
Team	Coeff.
(France) Lyon (Title holders)	111.400
(Germany) Wolfsburg	129.380
(Sweden) Rosengård	83.925
(Spain) Barcelona	68.520
(Denmark) Fortuna Hjørring	54.705
(Germany) Bayern Munich	48.380
(Denmark) Brøndby	47.705
(Russia) Rossiyanka	37.715
(England) Manchester City	36.490
(Scotland) Glasgow City	34.580
(Russia) Zvezda Perm	33.715
(Italy) Brescia	33.210
(Czech Republic) Slavia Praha	31.890
(Czech Republic) Sparta Praha	31.890
(Sweden) Linköping	30.295
(England) Chelsea	29.490
(France) Montpellier	26.400
(Norway) Lillestrøm	26.075
(Austria) St. Pölten	21.420
(Spain) Atlético Madrid	20.520
(Italy) Fiorentina	12.210

Advanced from qualifying round
Group	Winners (or best runners-up)	Coeff.
1	(Lithuania) Gintra Universitetas	15.960
2	(Romania) Olimpia Cluj	19.950
3	(Netherlands) Ajax	8.250
4	(Poland) Medyk Konin	19.600
5	(Cyprus) Apollon Limassol	23.940
6	(Belarus) FC Minsk	10.800
7	(Iceland) Stjarnan	15.610
8	(Kazakhstan) BIIK Kazygurt	24.930
9	(Norway) Avaldsnes	12.075
10	(Greece) PAOK	10.305
6	(Switzerland) Zürich (Best runners-up)	43.890

== Bracket ==
The full bracket was fixed after the quarter-final and semi-final draws.

Round of 32
(Netherlands) Ajax	1	0	1
(Italy) Brescia	0	2	2
(France) Montpellier	0	2	2
(Russia) Zvezda Perm	1	0	1
(England) Chelsea (a)	1	1	2
(Germany) Bayern Munich	0	2	2
(Romania) Olimpia Cluj	0	0	0
(Sweden) Rosengård	1	4	5
(Italy) Fiorentina	2	0	2
(Denmark) Fortuna Hjørring	1	0	1
(Spain) Atlético Madrid	0	2	2
(Germany) Wolfsburg	3	12	15
(Iceland) Stjarnan	1	4	5
(Russia) Rossiyanka	1	0	1
(Belarus) FC Minsk	1	3	4
(Czech Republic) Slavia Praha	3	4	7
(Norway) Lillestrøm	0	3	3
(Denmark) Brøndby	0	1	1
(Austria) St. Pölten	0	0	0
(England) Manchester City	3	3	6
(Greece) PAOK	0	0	0
(Czech Republic) Sparta Praha	5	3	8
(Cyprus) Apollon Limassol	0	0	0
(Sweden) Linköping	1	3	4
(Kazakhstan) BIIK Kazygurt (a)	3	1	4
(Scotland) Glasgow City	0	4	4
(Poland) Medyk Konin	0	0	0
(France) Lyon	5	9	14
(Lithuania) Gintra Universitetas	1	2	3
(Switzerland) Zürich	1	1	2
(Norway) Avaldsnes	0	0	0
(Spain) Barcelona	4	2	6

Round of 16
(Italy) Brescia	2	0	2
(France) Montpellier	3	6	9
(England) Chelsea	3	1	4
(Sweden) Rosengård	0	0	0
(Italy) Fiorentina	0	3	3
(Germany) Wolfsburg	4	3	7
(Iceland) Stjarnan	1	0	1
(Czech Republic) Slavia Praha	2	0	2
(Norway) Lillestrøm	0	1	1
(England) Manchester City	5	2	7
(Czech Republic) Sparta Praha	1	0	1
(Sweden) Linköping	1	3	4
(Kazakhstan) BIIK Kazygurt	0	0	0
(France) Lyon	7	9	16
(Lithuania) Gintra Universitetas	0	0	0
(Spain) Barcelona	6	3	9

Quarter-finals
(France) Montpellier	0	1	1
(England) Chelsea	2	3	5
(Germany) Wolfsburg	5	1	6
(Czech Republic) Slavia Praha	0	1	1
(England) Manchester City	2	5	7
(Sweden) Linköping	0	3	3
(France) Lyon	2	1	3
(Spain) Barcelona	1	0	1

Semi-finals
(England) Chelsea	1	0	1
(Germany) Wolfsburg	3	2	5
(England) Manchester City	0	0	0
(France) Lyon	0	1	1

Final
24 May – Kyiv
(Germany) Wolfsburg	1
(France) Lyon (a.e.t.)	4

== Round of 32 ==
The draw for the round of 32 was held on 1 September 2017, 13:30 CEST, at the UEFA headquarters in Nyon, Switzerland.

Seeded	Unseeded
(France) Lyon; (Germany) Wolfsburg; (Sweden) Rosengård; (Spain) Barcelona; (Denmark) Fortuna Hjørring; (Germany) Bayern Munich; (Denmark) Brøndby; (Switzerland) Zürich; (Russia) Rossiyanka; (England) Manchester City; (Scotland) Glasgow City; (Russia) Zvezda Perm; (Italy) Brescia; (Czech Republic) Slavia Praha; (Czech Republic) Sparta Praha; (Sweden) Linköping	(England) Chelsea; (France) Montpellier; (Norway) Lillestrøm; (Kazakhstan) BIIK Kazygurt; (Cyprus) Apollon Limassol; (Austria) St. Pölten; (Spain) Atlético Madrid; (Romania) Olimpia Cluj; (Poland) Medyk Konin; (Lithuania) Gintra Universitetas; (Iceland) Stjarnan; (Italy) Fiorentina; (Norway) Avaldsnes; (Belarus) FC Minsk; (Greece) PAOK; (Netherlands) Ajax

Notes

1. ^{†} Advanced from qualifying round.

=== Overview ===
The first legs were played on 4 and 5 October, and the second legs on 11 and 12 October 2017.

Team 1	Agg.	Team 2	1st leg	2nd leg
Stjarnan (Iceland)	5–1	(Russia) Rossiyanka	1–1	4–0
Fiorentina (Italy)	2–1	(Denmark) Fortuna Hjørring	2–1	0–0
Apollon Limassol (Cyprus)	0–4	(Sweden) Linköping	0–1	0–3
Montpellier (France)	2–1	(Russia) Zvezda Perm	0–1	2–0
BIIK Kazygurt (Kazakhstan)	4–4 (a)	(Scotland) Glasgow City	3–0	1–4
Gintra Universitetas (Lithuania)	3–2	(Switzerland) Zürich	1–1	2–1
Atlético Madrid (Spain)	2–15	(Germany) Wolfsburg	0–3	2–12
Lillestrøm (Norway)	3–1	(Denmark) Brøndby	0–0	3–1
Ajax (Netherlands)	1–2	(Italy) Brescia	1–0	0–2
St. Pölten (Austria)	0–6	(England) Manchester City	0–3	0–3
Chelsea (England)	2–2 (a)	(Germany) Bayern Munich	1–0	1–2
FC Minsk (Belarus)	4–7	(Czech Republic) Slavia Praha	1–3	3–4
Medyk Konin (Poland)	0–14	(France) Lyon	0–5	0–9
PAOK (Greece)	0–8	(Czech Republic) Sparta Praha	0–5	0–3
Olimpia Cluj (Romania)	0–5	(Sweden) Rosengård	0–1	0–4
Avaldsnes (Norway)	0–6	(Spain) Barcelona	0–4	0–2

=== Matches ===
5 October 2017
21:15

Stjarnan (Iceland)	1–1	(Russia) Rossiyanka
Ásbjörnsdóttir 22' (pen.)	Report	Shadrina 48'

Stjörnuvöllur, Garðabær
Attendance: 287
Referee: Barbara Poxhofer (Austria)
11 October 2017
15:30

Rossiyanka (Russia)	0–4	(Iceland) Stjarnan
	Report	Þorsteinsdóttir 41', 49'; Ásbjörnsdóttir 54'; Ananyeva 63' (o.g.)

Arena Khimki, Khimki
Attendance: 162
Referee: Sarah Garratt (England)

Stjarnan won 5–1 on aggregate.

4 October 2017
20:30

Fiorentina (Italy)	2–1	(Denmark) Fortuna Hjørring
Vigilucci 39'; Mauro 60'	Report	Bruun 73'

Stadio Artemio Franchi, Florence
Attendance: 2,881
Referee: Sofia Karagiorgi (Cyprus)
11 October 2017
20:00

Fortuna Hjørring (Denmark)	0–0	(Italy) Fiorentina
	Report

Hjørring Stadium, Hjørring
Attendance: 1,024
Referee: Bibiana Steinhaus (Germany)

Fiorentina won 2–1 on aggregate.

4 October 2017
16:00

Apollon Limassol (Cyprus)	0–1	(Sweden) Linköping
	Report	Minde 58'

Makario Stadium, Nicosia
Attendance: 100
Referee: Ivana Martinčić (Croatia)
11 October 2017
18:00

Linköping (Sweden)	3–0	(Cyprus) Apollon Limassol
Arnth 10'; Hurtig 72', 76'	Report

Linköping Arena, Linköping
Attendance: 1,402
Referee: Maria Marotta (Italy)

Linköping won 4–0 on aggregate.

4 October 2017
20:45

Montpellier (France)	0–1	(Russia) Zvezda Perm
	Report	Sembrant 64' (o.g.)

Stade de la Mosson, Montpellier
Attendance: 1,600
Referee: Sara Persson (Sweden)
11 October 2017
18:00

Zvezda Perm (Russia)	0–2	(France) Montpellier
	Report	Jakobsson 52', 71'

Sapsan Arena, Moscow
Attendance: 300
Referee: Eszter Urbán (Hungary)

Montpellier won 2–1 on aggregate.

4 October 2017
11:00

BIIK Kazygurt (Kazakhstan)	3–0	(Scotland) Glasgow City
Kirgizbaeva 48'; Korte 54'; Gabelia 58'	Report

BIIK Stadium, Shymkent
Attendance: 1,500
Referee: Eleni Antoniou (Greece)
12 October 2017
20:30

Glasgow City (Scotland)	4–1	(Kazakhstan) BIIK Kazygurt
Grant 43', 51', 63'; Murray 59'	Report	Ihezuo 19'

Petershill Park, Glasgow
Attendance: 552
Referee: Marta Huerta De Aza (Spain)

4–4 on aggregate. BIIK Kazygurt won on away goals.

4 October 2017
17:00

Gintra Universitetas (Lithuania)	1–1	(Switzerland) Zürich
Coleman 23'	Report	Moser 18'

Savivaldybė Stadium, Šiauliai
Attendance: 1,500
Referee: Angelika Söder (Germany)
11 October 2017
19:00

Zürich (Switzerland)	1–2	(Lithuania) Gintra Universitetas
Humm 73'	Report	Coleman 27', 86'

Letzigrund, Zürich
Attendance: 2,520
Referee: Lois Otte (Belgium)

Gintra Universitetas won 3–2 on aggregate.

4 October 2017
19:30

Atlético Madrid (Spain)	0–3	(Germany) Wolfsburg
	Report	Harder 47'; Meseguer 78' (o.g.); Pajor 86'

Estadio Cerro del Espino, Majadahonda
Attendance: 823
Referee: Florence Guillemin (France)
11 October 2017
17:00

Wolfsburg (Germany)	12–2	(Spain) Atlético Madrid
Popp 2', 15', 16'; Gunnarsdóttir 8'; Harder 29', 49'; Dickenmann 33', 44'; Jucinara 41' (o.g.); Wullaert 57', 83'; Graham Hansen 69'	Report	Ludmila 31'; Wedemeyer 76' (o.g.)

AOK Stadion, Wolfsburg
Attendance: 1,753
Referee: Justina Lavrenovaitė (Lithuania)

Wolfsburg won 15–2 on aggregate.

4 October 2017
19:00

Lillestrøm (Norway)	0–0	(Denmark) Brøndby
	Report

Åråsen Stadion, Lillestrøm
Attendance: 829
Referee: Désirée Grundbacher (Switzerland)
11 October 2017
18:00

Brøndby (Denmark)	1–3	(Norway) Lillestrøm
Larsen 61'	Report	Berget 8'; Bachor 21'; Haavi 66'

Brøndby Stadium, Brøndby
Attendance: 1,336
Referee: Eleni Lampadariou (Greece)

Lillestrøm won 3–1 on aggregate.

4 October 2017
19:30

Ajax (Netherlands)	1–0	(Italy) Brescia
Bakker 88'	Report

Sportpark De Toekomst, Ouder-Amstel
Attendance: 1,700
Referee: Lorraine Clark (Scotland)
11 October 2017
20:30

Brescia (Italy)	2–0	(Netherlands) Ajax
Daleszczyk 23'; Mendes 83'	Report

Stadio Mario Rigamonti, Brescia
Attendance: 2,030
Referee: Volha Tsiareshka (Belarus)

Brescia won 2–1 on aggregate.

4 October 2017
20:15

St. Pölten (Austria)	0–3	(England) Manchester City
	Report	Stokes 23'; Houghton 31'; Parris 35'

NV Arena, Sankt Pölten
Attendance: 2,236
Referee: Sandra Bastos (Portugal)
12 October 2017
20:00

Manchester City (England)	3–0	(Austria) St. Pölten
Parris 35'; Scott 44'; Lawley 85'	Report

Academy Stadium, Manchester
Attendance: 1,041
Referee: Monika Mularczyk (Poland)

Manchester City won 6–0 on aggregate.

4 October 2017
20:05

Chelsea (England)	1–0	(Germany) Bayern Munich
Spence 10'	Report

Kingsmeadow, Kingston upon Thames
Attendance: 2,136
Referee: Olga Zadinová (Czech Republic)
11 October 2017
19:00

Bayern Munich (Germany)	2–1	(England) Chelsea
Davison 76' (o.g.); Voňková 83'	Report	Kirby 60'

Grünwalder Stadion, Munich
Attendance: 1,285
Referee: Katalin Kulcsár (Hungary)

2–2 on aggregate. Chelsea won on away goals.

4 October 2017
17:30

FC Minsk (Belarus)	1–3	(Czech Republic) Slavia Praha
Khimich 60'	Report	Svitková 28'; Cahynová 74'; Divišová 80'

FC Minsk Stadium, Minsk
Attendance: 2,000
Referee: Ivana Projkovska (Macedonia)
11 October 2017
18:30

Slavia Praha (Czech Republic)	4–3	(Belarus) FC Minsk
Svitková 7', 63', 85'; Cahynová 82'	Report	Duben 4'; Khimich 34' (pen.); Ogbiagbevha 90'

Eden Arena, Prague
Attendance: 1,535
Referee: Ewa Augustyn (Poland)

Slavia Praha won 7–4 on aggregate.

4 October 2017
15:15

Medyk Konin (Poland)	0–5	(France) Lyon
	Report	Hegerberg 11', 29', 67'; Renard 32'; Le Sommer 83'

Stadion im. Złotej Jedenastki Kazimierza Górskiego w Koninie, Konin
Attendance: 1,200
Referee: Anastasia Romanyuk (Ukraine)
11 October 2017
18:30

Lyon (France)	9–0	(Poland) Medyk Konin
Majri 22'; Hegerberg 29', 39'; Bronze 32'; Renard 38', 62', 88'; Abily 43'; Kumagai 65' (pen.)	Report

Parc Olympique Lyonnais, Décines-Charpieu
Attendance: 4,822
Referee: Vivian Peeters (Netherlands)

Lyon won 14–0 on aggregate.

4 October 2017
16:00

PAOK (Greece)	0–5	(Czech Republic) Sparta Praha
	Report	Martínková 14', 45+1', 87'; Hälinen 61'; Kladrubská 82'

Toumba Stadium, Thessaloniki
Attendance: 810
Referee: Ifeoma Kulmala (Finland)
11 October 2017
18:00

Sparta Praha (Czech Republic)	3–0	(Greece) PAOK
Stašková 27', 88'; Mocová 61'	Report

Generali Arena, Prague
Attendance: 526
Referee: Rebecca Welch (England)

Sparta Praha won 8–0 on aggregate.

5 October 2017
15:30

Olimpia Cluj (Romania)	0–1	(Sweden) Rosengård
	Report	Wieder 35'

Cluj Arena, Cluj-Napoca
Attendance: 250
Referee: Petra Pavlíková (Slovakia)
11 October 2017
19:00

Rosengård (Sweden)	4–0	(Romania) Olimpia Cluj
Mittag 37'; Landeka 63'; Folkesson 75'; Viggósdóttir 90+2'	Report

Malmö IP, Malmö
Attendance: 633
Referee: Efthalia Mitsi (Greece)

Rosengård won 5–0 on aggregate.

4 October 2017
18:00

Avaldsnes (Norway)	0–4	(Spain) Barcelona
	Report	Martens 19'; Duggan 70'; Andressa 75'; Caldentey 81'

Haugesund Stadion, Haugesund
Attendance: 4,528
Referee: Silvia Domingos (Portugal)
11 October 2017
18:30

Barcelona (Spain)	2–0	(Norway) Avaldsnes
Martens 52'; Losada 57'	Report

Mini Estadi, Barcelona
Attendance: 957
Referee: Graziella Pirriatore (Italy)

Barcelona won 6–0 on aggregate.

== Round of 16 ==
The draw for the round of 16 was held on 16 October 2017, 13:30 CEST, at the UEFA headquarters in Nyon, Switzerland.

Seeded	Unseeded
(France) Lyon; (Germany) Wolfsburg; (Sweden) Rosengård; (Spain) Barcelona; (England) Manchester City; (Italy) Brescia; (Czech Republic) Slavia Praha; (Czech Republic) Sparta Praha	(Sweden) Linköping; (England) Chelsea; (France) Montpellier; (Norway) Lillestrøm; (Kazakhstan) BIIK Kazygurt; (Lithuania) Gintra Universitetas; (Iceland) Stjarnan; (Italy) Fiorentina

=== Overview ===
The first legs were played on 8 and 9 November and the second legs on 15 and 16 November 2017.

Team 1	Agg.	Team 2	1st leg	2nd leg
Sparta Praha (Czech Republic)	1–4	(Sweden) Linköping	1–1	0–3
Gintra Universitetas (Lithuania)	0–9	(Spain) Barcelona	0–6	0–3
Chelsea (England)	4–0	(Sweden) Rosengård	3–0	1–0
Lillestrøm (Norway)	1–7	(England) Manchester City	0–5	1–2
Brescia (Italy)	2–9	(France) Montpellier	2–3	0–6
BIIK Kazygurt (Kazakhstan)	0–16	(France) Lyon	0–7	0–9
Fiorentina (Italy)	3–7	(Germany) Wolfsburg	0–4	3–3
Stjarnan (Iceland)	1–2	(Czech Republic) Slavia Praha	1–2	0–0

=== Matches ===
8 November 2017
18:00

Sparta Praha (Czech Republic)	1–1	(Sweden) Linköping
Strom 47'	Report	Hurtig 54'

Generali Arena, Prague
Attendance: 489
Referee: Désirée Grundbacher (Switzerland)
15 November 2017
18:00

Linköping (Sweden)	3–0	(Czech Republic) Sparta Praha
Hurtig 18'; Minde 78'; Sørensen 86'	Report

Linköping Arena, Linköping
Attendance: 701
Referee: Angelika Söder (Germany)

Linköping won 4–1 on aggregate.

8 November 2017
17:00

Gintra Universitetas (Lithuania)	0–6	(Spain) Barcelona
	Report	Bonmatí 36'; Caldentey 44', 57'; Duggan 68'; García 82'; Andonova 89'

Savivaldybė Stadium, Šiauliai
Attendance: 3,500
Referee: Lorraine Clark (Scotland)
15 November 2017
18:30

Barcelona (Spain)	3–0	(Lithuania) Gintra Universitetas
Putellas 35'; Duggan 44'; Alekperova 76' (o.g.)	Report

Mini Estadi, Barcelona
Attendance: 707
Referee: Eszter Urbán (Hungary)

Barcelona won 9–0 on aggregate.

8 November 2017
20:05

Chelsea (England)	3–0	(Sweden) Rosengård
Kirby 33'; Bachmann 66'; Flaherty 73'	Report

Kingsmeadow, Kingston upon Thames
Attendance: 1,861
Referee: Bibiana Steinhaus (Germany)
15 November 2017
18:30

Rosengård (Sweden)	0–1	(England) Chelsea
	Report	Ji 53'

Malmö IP, Malmö
Attendance: 1,358
Referee: Esther Staubli (Switzerland)

Chelsea won 4–0 on aggregate.

9 November 2017
18:30

Lillestrøm (Norway)	0–5	(England) Manchester City
	Report	Stokes 26'; Christiansen 40' (pen.); Emslie 69'; Ross 74', 78'

Åråsen Stadion, Lillestrøm
Attendance: 1,225
Referee: Stéphanie Frappart (France)
16 November 2017
20:00

Manchester City (England)	2–1	(Norway) Lillestrøm
Christiansen 46'; Parris 73'	Report	Berget 17'

Academy Stadium, Manchester
Attendance: 716
Referee: Olga Zadinová (Czech Republic)

Manchester City won 7–1 on aggregate.

8 November 2017
15:00

Brescia (Italy)	2–3	(France) Montpellier
Girelli 8', 37'	Report	Blackstenius 30'; Cayman 42'; Sembrant 58'

Stadio Tullio Saleri, Lumezzane
Attendance: 1,100
Referee: Jana Adámková (Czech Republic)
15 November 2017
20:45

Montpellier (France)	6–0	(Italy) Brescia
Dekker 19'; Jakobsson 25'; Veje 37'; Toletti 67'; Léger 81'; Torrecilla 85'	Report

Stade de la Mosson, Montpellier
Attendance: 1,263
Referee: Katalin Kulcsár (Hungary)

Montpellier won 9–2 on aggregate.

8 November 2017
07:00

BIIK Kazygurt (Kazakhstan)	0–7	(France) Lyon
	Report	Hegerberg 5', 19' (pen.), 73', 90'; Abily 44'; Majri 47'; Le Sommer 75'

BIIK Stadium, Shymkent
Attendance: 250
Referee: Sofia Karagiorgi (Cyprus)
15 November 2017
20:30

Lyon (France)	9–0	(Kazakhstan) BIIK Kazygurt
Majri 12'; Hegerberg 32', 36', 46', 58' (pen.); Abily 43', 69', 83'; Cascarino 73'	Report

Groupama Academy Stadium, Décines-Charpieu
Attendance: 509
Referee: Silvia Domingos (Portugal)

Lyon won 16–0 on aggregate.

8 November 2017
19:00

Fiorentina (Italy)	0–4	(Germany) Wolfsburg
	Report	Gunnarsdóttir 49', 60'; Harder 54'; Popp 73'

Stadio Artemio Franchi, Florence
Attendance: 2,369
Referee: Sara Persson (Sweden)
15 November 2017
18:00

Wolfsburg (Germany)	3–3	(Italy) Fiorentina
Wullaert 30', 32'; Gunnarsdóttir 71'	Report	Mauro 2'; Rinaldi 60'; Brazil 81'

AOK Stadion, Wolfsburg
Attendance: 1,226
Referee: Kateryna Monzul (Ukraine)

Wolfsburg won 7–3 on aggregate.

9 November 2017
20:00

Stjarnan (Iceland)	1–2	(Czech Republic) Slavia Praha
Pedersen 69'	Report	Divišová 36'; Svitková 71' (pen.)

Stjörnuvöllur, Garðabær
Attendance: 372
Referee: Justina Lavrenovaitė (Lithuania)
16 November 2017
18:30

Slavia Praha (Czech Republic)	0–0	(Iceland) Stjarnan
	Report

Eden Arena, Prague
Attendance: 1,306
Referee: Ivana Martinčić (Croatia)

Slavia Praha won 2–1 on aggregate.

== Quarter-finals ==
The draw for the quarter-finals was held on 24 November 2017, 13:30 CET, at the UEFA headquarters in Nyon, Switzerland.

=== Overview ===
The first legs were played on 21 and 22 March, and the second legs on 28 March 2018.

Team 1	Agg.	Team 2	1st leg	2nd leg
Montpellier (France)	1–5	(England) Chelsea	0–2	1–3
Wolfsburg (Germany)	6–1	(Czech Republic) Slavia Praha	5–0	1–1
Manchester City (England)	7–3	(Sweden) Linköping	2–0	5–3
Lyon (France)	3–1	(Spain) Barcelona	2–1	1–0

=== Matches ===
21 March 2018
20:45

Montpellier (France)	0–2	(England) Chelsea
	Report	Ji 49'; Cuthbert 77'

Stade de la Mosson, Montpellier
Attendance: 5,291
Referee: Kateryna Monzul (Ukraine)
28 March 2018
20:05

Chelsea (England)	3–1	(France) Montpellier
Kirby 4', 77' (pen.); Bachmann 50'	Report	Jakobsson 36'

Kingsmeadow, Kingston upon Thames
Attendance: 3,050
Referee: Anastasia Pustovoitova (Russia)

Chelsea won 5–1 on aggregate.

22 March 2018
18:00

Wolfsburg (Germany)	5–0	(Czech Republic) Slavia Praha
Harder 12', 58'; Graham Hansen 13'; Gunnarsdóttir 39'; Pajor 85'	Report

AOK Stadion, Wolfsburg
Attendance: 1,326
Referee: Florence Guillemin (France)
28 March 2018
18:00

Slavia Praha (Czech Republic)	1–1	(Germany) Wolfsburg
Divišová 30'	Report	Pajor 68'

Eden Arena, Prague
Attendance: 1,712
Referee: Lina Lehtovaara (Finland)

Wolfsburg won 6–1 on aggregate.

21 March 2018
20:00

Manchester City (England)	2–0	(Sweden) Linköping
Parris 37' (pen.); Ross 55'	Report

Academy Stadium, Manchester
Attendance: 1,259
Referee: Stéphanie Frappart (France)
28 March 2018
18:00

Linköping (Sweden)	3–5	(England) Manchester City
Banušić 51', 60' (pen.); Almqvist 77'	Report	Ross 14'; Stanway 23', 33'; Beattie 42'; Christiansen 64'

Linköping Arena, Linköping
Attendance: 1,903
Referee: Jana Adámková (Czech Republic)

Manchester City won 7–3 on aggregate.

22 March 2018
18:45

Lyon (France)	2–1	(Spain) Barcelona
Marozsán 44'; Hegerberg 80'	Report	Guijarro 72'

Parc Olympique Lyonnais, Décines-Charpieu
Attendance: 15,104
Referee: Pernilla Larsson (Sweden)
28 March 2018
19:00

Barcelona (Spain)	0–1	(France) Lyon
	Report	Le Sommer 62'

Mini Estadi, Barcelona
Attendance: 12,178
Referee: Sandra Bastos (Portugal)

Lyon won 3–1 on aggregate.

== Semi-finals ==
The draw for the semi-finals was held on 24 November 2017, 13:30 CET (together with the quarter-final draw), at the UEFA headquarters in Nyon, Switzerland.

=== Overview ===
The first legs were played on 22 April, and the second legs on 29 April 2018.

Team 1	Agg.	Team 2	1st leg	2nd leg
Chelsea (England)	1–5	(Germany) Wolfsburg	1–3	0–2
Manchester City (England)	0–1	(France) Lyon	0–0	0–1

=== Matches ===
22 April 2018
19:05

Chelsea (England)	1–3	(Germany) Wolfsburg
Ji 3'	Report	Gunnarsdóttir 18'; Bright 43' (o.g.); Dickenmann 66'

Kingsmeadow, Kingston upon Thames
Attendance: 3,329
Referee: Esther Staubli (Switzerland)
29 April 2018
17:30

Wolfsburg (Germany)	2–0	(England) Chelsea
Harder 69'; Pajor 78'	Report

AOK Stadion, Wolfsburg
Attendance: 3,813
Referee: Olga Zadinová (Czech Republic)

Wolfsburg won 5–1 on aggregate.

22 April 2018
14:00

Manchester City (England)	0–0	(France) Lyon
	Report

Academy Stadium, Manchester
Attendance: 2,876
Referee: Bibiana Steinhaus (Germany)
29 April 2018
14:45

Lyon (France)	1–0	(England) Manchester City
Bronze 17'	Report

Parc Olympique Lyonnais, Décines-Charpieu
Attendance: 20,837
Referee: Katalin Kulcsár (Hungary)

Lyon won 1–0 on aggregate.

== Final ==
The final was played at the Valeriy Lobanovskyi Dynamo Stadium in Kyiv on 24 May 2018. The "home" team for the final (for administrative purposes) was determined by an additional draw held after the quarter-final and semi-final draws.

24 May 2018
18:00 (19:00 UTC+3)

Wolfsburg (Germany)	1–4 (a.e.t.)	(France) Lyon
Harder 93'	Report	Henry 98'; Le Sommer 99'; Hegerberg 103'; Abily 116'

Valeriy Lobanovskyi Dynamo Stadium, Kyiv
Attendance: 14,237
Referee: Jana Adámková (Czech Republic)
