= 2018 UEFA Women's Champions League final =

2018 UEFA Women's Champions League Final
- Match programme cover
- Event: 2017–18 UEFA Women's Champions League
Wolfsburg	Lyon
(Germany)	(France)
1	4
- After extra time
- Date: 24 May 2018
- Venue: Valeriy Lobanovskyi Dynamo Stadium, Kyiv
- Player of the Match: Amandine Henry (Lyon)
- Referee: Jana Adámková (Czech Republic)
- Attendance: 14,237
- Weather: Clear night 26 °C (79 °F); 53% humidity

The 2018 UEFA Women's Champions League Final was the final match of the 2017–18 UEFA Women's Champions League, the 17th season of Europe's premier women's club football tournament organised by UEFA, and the ninth season since it was renamed from the UEFA Women's Cup to the UEFA Women's Champions League. It was played at the Valeriy Lobanovskyi Dynamo Stadium in Kyiv, Ukraine, on 24 May 2018, between German side Wolfsburg and French side Lyon. This was the last time that a host city for the Women's Champions League final is automatically assigned by which city won the bid to host the men's Champions League final.

Lyon won the match 4–1 after extra time, following a scoreless opening 90 minutes; Wolfsburg's Pernille Harder opened the scoring in the 93rd minute, before goals from Amandine Henry, Eugénie Le Sommer, Ada Hegerberg and Camille Abily sealed the win for Lyon, their third UEFA Women's Champions League title in a row (the first team to do so) and their record fifth overall.

== Teams ==
In the following table, finals until 2009 were in the UEFA Women's Cup era, since 2010 were in the UEFA Women's Champions League era.

Team	Previous finals appearances (bold indicates winners)
(Germany) Wolfsburg	3 (**2013**, **2014**, 2016)
(France) Lyon	6 (2010, **2011**, **2012**, 2013, **2016**, **2017**)

This was Lyon's seventh UEFA Women's Champions League Final, a new record. This was the third UEFA Women's Champions League Final between the two teams, after 2013 (won by Wolfsburg 1–0) and 2016 (won by Lyon 4–3 on penalties, 1–1 after extra time), and the third season in a row where the two teams met, as they also played each other in the previous season's quarter-finals, won by Lyon 2–1 on aggregate.

== Venue ==
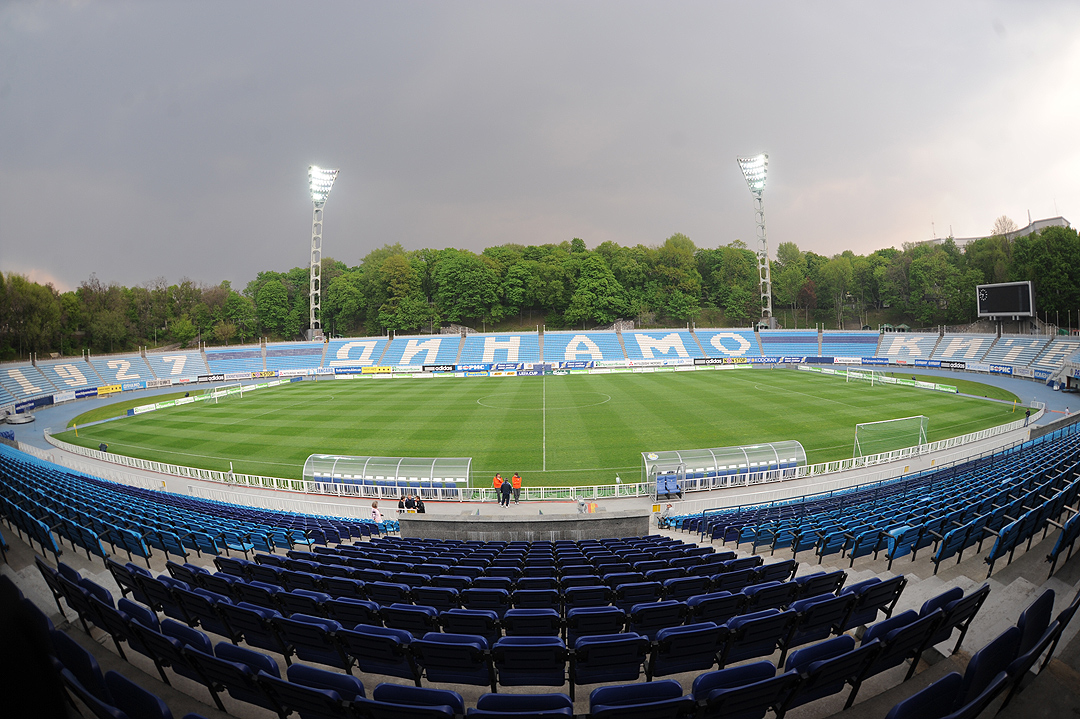
The Valeriy Lobanovskyi Dynamo Stadium in Kyiv hosted the final

The Valeriy Lobanovskyi Dynamo Stadium was announced as the final venue on 15 September 2016, following the decision of the UEFA Executive Committee meeting in Athens, Greece to appoint NSC Olimpiyskiy Stadium as the venue of the 2018 UEFA Champions League Final.

== Route to the final ==
Note: In all results below, the score of the finalist is given first (H: home; A: away).

(Germany) Wolfsburg				Round	(France) Lyon			
Opponent	Agg.	1st leg	2nd leg	Knockout phase	Opponent	Agg.	1st leg	2nd leg
(Spain) Atlético Madrid	15–2	3–0 (A)	12–2 (H)	Round of 32	(Poland) Medyk Konin	14–0	5–0 (A)	9–0 (H)
(Italy) Fiorentina	7–3	4–0 (A)	3–3 (H)	Round of 16	(Kazakhstan) BIIK Kazygurt	16–0	7–0 (A)	9–0 (H)
(Czech Republic) Slavia Praha	6–1	5–0 (H)	1–1 (A)	Quarter-finals	(Spain) Barcelona	3–1	2–1 (H)	1–0 (A)
(England) Chelsea	5–1	3–1 (A)	2–0 (H)	Semi-finals	(England) Manchester City	1–0	0–0 (A)	1–0 (H)

== Pre-match ==
=== Ambassador ===
The ambassador for the final was Ukrainian international player Iya Andrushchak.

=== Ticketing ===
Tickets were available on sale for ₴100 and ₴70.

=== Opening ceremony ===
Ukrainian singer Tayanna performed at the opening ceremony preceding the final.

== Match ==
=== Officials ===
On 7 May 2018, UEFA announced that Jana Adámková of the Czech Republic would officiate the final. She would be joined by Sian Massey-Ellis of England and Sanja Rođak-Karšić of Croatia as assistant referees. The fourth official for the final was Ukrainian Kateryna Monzul, joined by fellow countrywoman Maryna Striletska as reserve official.

=== Summary ===
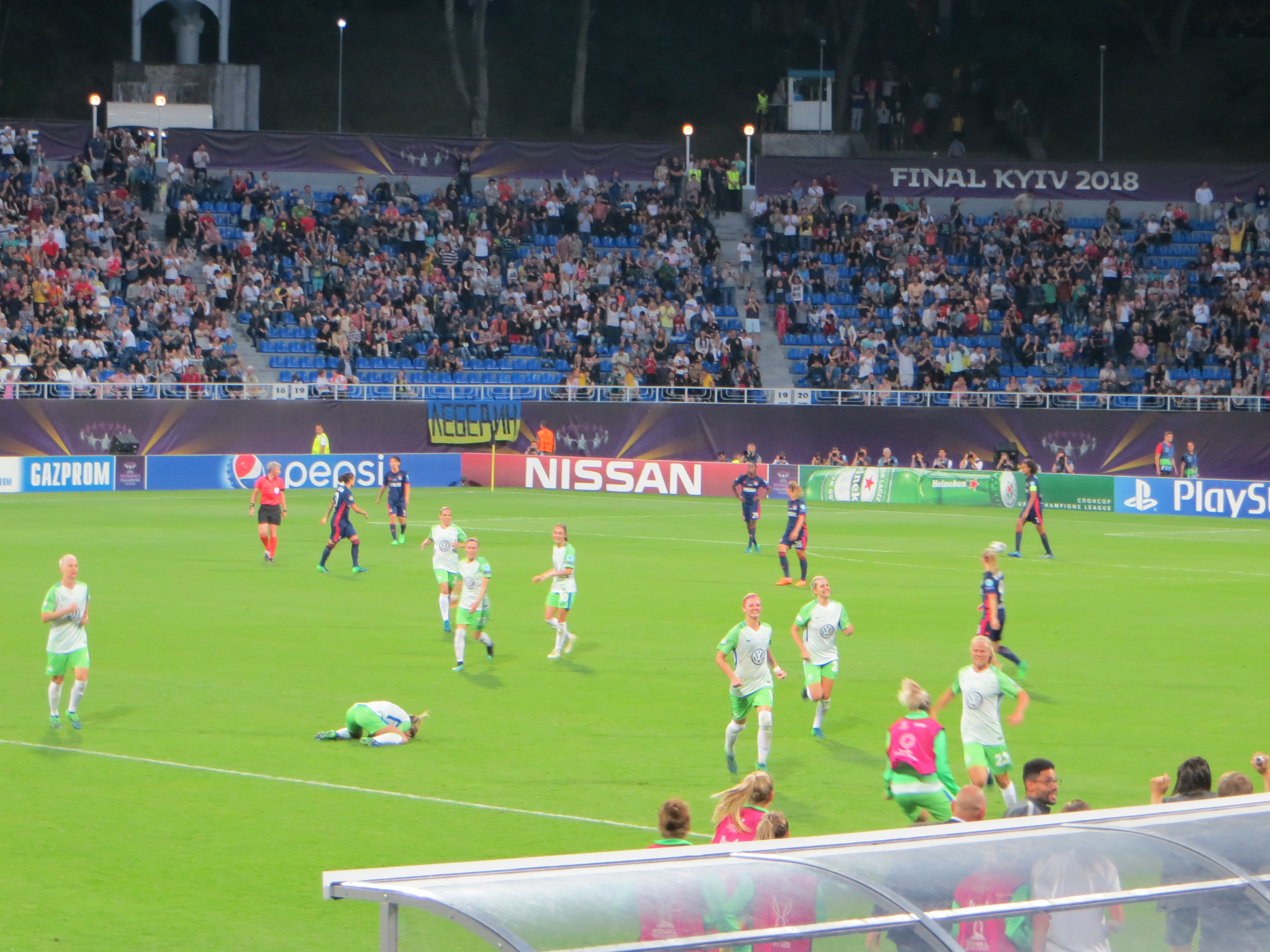
Scenes from the match

The match began with near-empty stands due to heavy security at the Valeriy Lobanovskyi Dynamo Stadium, where attendance was primarily local Kyivans. Lyon had the majority of chances in the first half, with several shots near the goal that were saved or deflected out of bounds. While Wolfsburg failed to register a shot on target during the first half, the team had several attacks that were stopped prematurely by Lyon's defense. Wolfsburg substituted two of their midfielders, Caroline Graham Hansen and Sara Björk Gunnarsdóttir, to bring on winger Tessa Wullaert and relieve Gunnarsdóttir after she showed signs of fatigue. Wolfsburg's defense forced several long-distance shots from Lyon early in the second half, while the team's attacking players failed to create chances on counterattacks. In the 69th minute, Lyon appeared to have scored the match's first goal on a shot by Amandine Henry, but it was disallowed by referee Jana Adámková. During the first 90 minutes of play, Wolfsburg only registered two shots, neither of which were on target.

Wolfsburg scored their first goal in the third minute of extra time on a deflected strike from Pernille Harder. Two minutes later, a tackle by Wolfsburg's Alexandra Popp on Delphine Cascarino earned her a second yellow card and she was sent off. Lyon's Henry scored the equalizing goal in the 95th minute on a long-range shot into the top corner of the goal. A minute later, Lyon's Eugénie Le Sommer scored the team's second goal on an assist from Shanice van de Sanden. Van de Sanden would also assist Lyon's next two goals, scored by Ada Hegerberg in the 103rd minute and Camille Abily in the 116th minute, as the team clinched their fifth Champions League title.

=== Details ===
The "home" team (for administrative purposes) was determined by an additional draw held after the quarter-final and semi-final draws, which was held on 24 November 2017, 13:30 CET, at the UEFA headquarters in Nyon, Switzerland.

24 May 2018
19:00 UTC+3

Wolfsburg (Germany)	1–4 (a.e.t.)	(France) Lyon
Harder 93'	Report	Henry 98'; Le Sommer 99'; Hegerberg 103'; Abily 116'

Valeriy Lobanovskyi Dynamo Stadium, Kyiv
Attendance: 14,237
Referee: Jana Adámková (Czech Republic)

**Wolfsburg**	**Lyon**

GK	1	(Germany) Almuth Schult
RB	9	(Germany) Anna Blässe
CB	4	(Sweden) Nilla Fischer (c)
CB	28	(Germany) Lena Goeßling
LB	16	(Switzerland) Noelle Maritz	(yellow card) 80'
RM	26	(Norway) Caroline Graham Hansen		(substituted off) 46'
CM	7	(Iceland) Sara Björk Gunnarsdóttir		(substituted off) 57'
CM	11	(Germany) Alexandra Popp	(yellow card) 72' (yellow-red card) 96'
LM	21	(Switzerland) Lara Dickenmann		(substituted off) 89'
CF	17	(Poland) Ewa Pajor
CF	22	(Denmark) Pernille Harder
Substitutes:
GK	29	(Germany) Merle Frohms
DF	6	(Germany) Katharina Baunach
DF	8	(Germany) Babett Peter
DF	24	(Germany) Joelle Wedemeyer		(substituted on) 57'
MF	3	(Hungary) Zsanett Jakabfi
MF	27	(Germany) Isabel Kerschowski		(substituted on) 89'
FW	10	(Belgium) Tessa Wullaert		(substituted on) 46'
Manager:
(Germany) Stephan Lerch

GK	16	(France) Sarah Bouhaddi
RB	22	(England) Lucy Bronze
CB	29	(France) Griedge Mbock Bathy
CB	3	(France) Wendie Renard (c)	(yellow card) 107'
LB	4	(France) Selma Bacha	(yellow card) 61'	(substituted off) 65'
RM	10	(Germany) Dzsenifer Marozsán
CM	5	(Japan) Saki Kumagai		(substituted off) 95'
CM	26	(France) Amandine Henry
LM	7	(France) Amel Majri
CF	14	(Norway) Ada Hegerberg
CF	9	(France) Eugénie Le Sommer		(substituted off) 114'
Substitutes:
GK	1	(France) Pauline Peyraud-Magnin
DF	21	(Canada) Kadeisha Buchanan
MF	8	(France) Jessica Houara
MF	11	(France) Kheira Hamraoui
MF	23	(France) Camille Abily		(substituted on) 114'
FW	19	(Netherlands) Shanice van de Sanden		(substituted on) 95'
FW	20	(France) Delphine Cascarino		(substituted on) 65'
Manager:
(France) Reynald Pedros

Player of the Match:
Amandine Henry (Lyon)

Assistant referees:
Sian Massey-Ellis (England)
Sanja Rođak-Karšić (Croatia)
Fourth official:
Kateryna Monzul (Ukraine)
Reserve official:
Maryna Striletska (Ukraine)

**Match rules**

- 90 minutes.
- 30 minutes of extra time if necessary.
- Penalty shoot-out if scores still level.
- Seven named substitutes, of which up to three may be used.

=== Statistics ===
Statistic	Wolfsburg	Lyon
Goals scored	1	4
Total shots	6	26
Shots on target	3	15
Saves	11	2
Ball possession	55%	45%
Corner kicks	3	8
Fouls committed	11	10
Offsides	2	2
Yellow cards	3	2
Red cards	1	0

== See also ==
- 2017–18 Olympique Lyonnais Féminin season
- 2018 UEFA Champions League final
- 2018 UEFA Europa League final
- Played between same clubs:
- 2013 UEFA Women's Champions League final
- 2016 UEFA Women's Champions League final
- 2020 UEFA Women's Champions League final
