= 2017–18 UEFA Women's Champions League =

17th edition of the European women's club football championship organized by UEFA

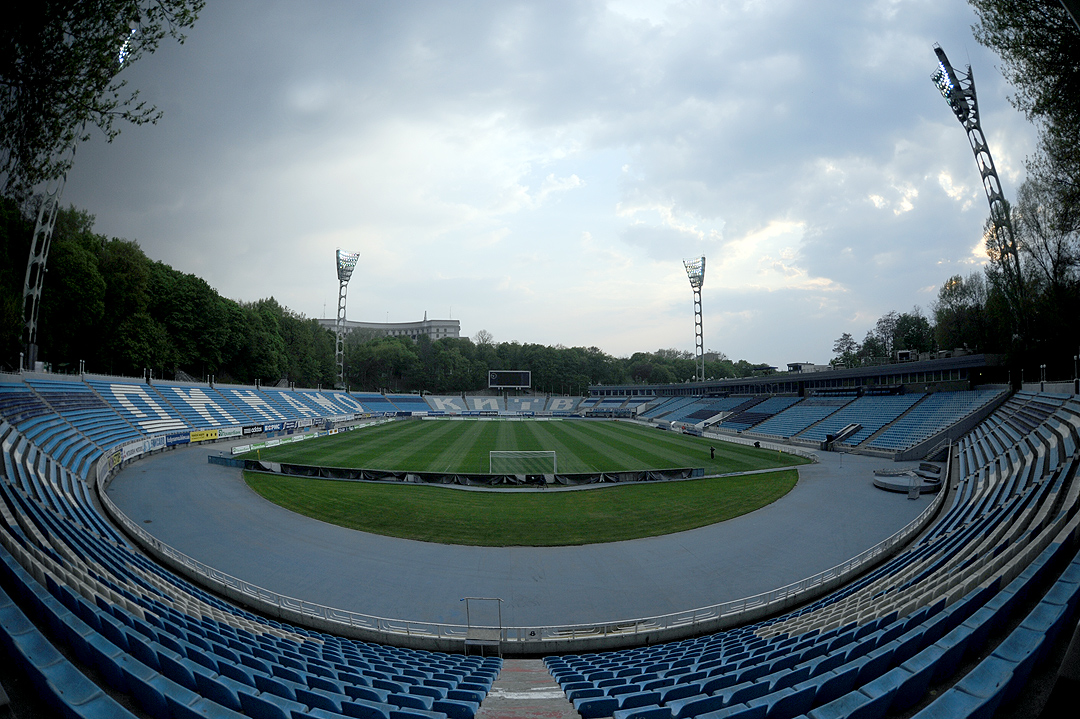
- The Valeriy Lobanovskyi Dynamo Stadium in Kyiv hosted the final

Tournament details
- Dates: Qualifying round: 22–28 August 2017; Knockout phase: 4 October 2017 – 24 May 2018
- Teams: Knockout phase: 32; Total: 61 (from 49 associations)

Final positions
- Champions: (France) Lyon (5th title)
- Runners-up: (Germany) Wolfsburg

Tournament statistics
- Matches played: 121
- Goals scored: 448 (3.7 per match)
- Attendance: 156,973 (1,297 per match)
- Top scorer(s): (Norway) Ada Hegerberg; 15 goals

The 2017–18 UEFA Women's Champions League was the 17th season of the European women's club football championship organised by UEFA, and the ninth since being rebranded as the UEFA Women's Champions League.

The final was held at the Valeriy Lobanovskyi Dynamo Stadium in Kyiv, Ukraine on 24 May 2018, two days before the final of the men's tournament played at the NSC Olimpiyskiy Stadium in the same city.

In the final, Lyon defeated Wolfsburg to win a record fifth title, and also became the first team to win three titles in a row.

== Association team allocation ==
A maximum of 68 teams from 55 UEFA member associations were eligible to participate in the 2017–18 UEFA Women's Champions League. The association ranking based on the UEFA league coefficient for women is used to determine the number of participating teams for each association:

- Associations 1–12 each have two teams qualify.
- All other associations, should they enter, each have one team qualify.
- The winners of the 2016–17 UEFA Women's Champions League are given an additional entry if they do not qualify for the 2017–18 UEFA Women's Champions League through their domestic league. Since the title holders Lyon qualified through their domestic league, the additional entry for the Champions League title holders was not necessary for this season.

=== Association ranking ===
For the 2017–18 UEFA Women's Champions League, the associations are allocated places according to their 2016 UEFA league coefficients for women, which takes into account their performance in European competitions from 2011–12 to 2015–16.

Rank	Association	Coeff.	Teams
1	Germany	89.500	2
2	France	77.000	2
3	Sweden	65.500	2
4	England	51.000	2
5	Spain	41.500	2
6	Russia	40.500	2
7	Italy	38.500	2
8	Denmark	38.500	2
9	(Czech Republic) Czech Republic	35.000	2
10	Austria	30.500	2
11	Scotland	30.000	2
12	Norway	28.500	2
13	Switzerland	28.000	1
14	Netherlands	20.000	1
15	Kazakhstan	19.000	1
16	Cyprus	18.000	1
17	Belgium	17.000	1
18	Poland	16.500	1
19	Iceland	16.500	1

Rank	Association	Coeff.	Teams
20	Romania	16.000	1
21	Serbia	15.000	1
22	Hungary	13.500	1
23	Finland	13.000	1
24	Turkey	11.500	1
25	(Republic of Ireland) Republic of Ireland	11.000	1
26	(Bosnia and Herzegovina) Bosnia and Herzegovina	11.000	1
27	Portugal	10.500	1
28	Lithuania	10.500	1
29	Belarus	10.000	1
30	Ukraine	10.000	1
31	Slovenia	9.000	1
32	Croatia	9.000	1
33	Greece	8.500	1
34	Israel	8.000	1
35	Bulgaria	6.500	1
36	Estonia	6.000	1
37	Slovakia	5.500	1

Rank	Association	Coeff.	Teams
38	(Northern Ireland) Northern Ireland	3.000	1
39	(Faroe Islands) Faroe Islands	3.000	1
40	(North Macedonia) Macedonia	3.000	1
41	Wales	2.000	1
42	Albania	1.500	1
43	Latvia	1.000	1
44	Montenegro	1.000	1
45	Malta	0.500	1
46	Moldova	0.000	1
47	Luxembourg	0.000	1
(NR)	(Georgia (country)) Georgia	0.000	1
(NR)	Kosovo	0.000	1
(NR)	Andorra	0.000	0 (DNE)
(NR)	Armenia	0.000	0 (DNE)
(NR)	Azerbaijan	0.000	0 (DNE)
(NR)	Gibraltar	0.000	0 (DNE)
(NR)	Liechtenstein	0.000	0 (DNE)
(NR)	(San Marino) San Marino	0.000	0 (DNE)

Notes

- (TH) – Additional berth for title holders
- (DNE) – Did not enter
- (NR) – No rank (association did not enter in the five seasons used for computing coefficients)

=== Distribution ===
The format of the competition remained unchanged from previous years, starting from the qualifying round (played as mini-tournaments with four teams in each group), followed by the knockout phase starting from the round of 32 (played as home-and-away two-legged ties except for the one-match final).

Unlike the men's Champions League, not every association enters a team, and so the exact number of teams entering in each round (qualifying round and round of 32) can not be determined until the full entry list is known. In general, the title holders, the champions of the top 12 associations, plus the runners-up of highest-ranked associations (exact number depending on the number of entries) receive a bye to the round of 32. All other teams (runners-up of lowest-ranked associations plus champions of associations starting from 13th) enter the qualifying round, with the group winners plus a maximum of two best runners-up advancing to the round of 32.

=== Teams ===
A record total of 61 teams from 49 associations entered this season's competition. Two associations had no league as of 2016–17 (Liechtenstein, San Marino). Andorra's league was not played eleven-a-side. The champions of Armenia (Yerevan LH), Azerbaijan (Gabala) and Gibraltar (Lincoln Red Imps) did not enter. Georgia entered a team for the first time since 2010–11, while Luxembourg returned after a one-year absence.

Among the entrants, 21 teams entered the round of 32: the champions and runners-up from associations 1–9 (including title holders Lyon) and the champions from associations 10–12. The remaining 40 teams entered the qualifying round: the runners-up from associations 10–12 and the champions from the 37 associations ranked 13 or lower.

Legend

- TH: Women's Champions League title holders
- CH: Domestic league champions
- RU: Domestic league runners-up

Round of 32 (Champions from associations 1–12 + Runners-up from associations 1–9)
(Germany) Wolfsburg (CH)	(Germany) Bayern Munich (RU)	(France) Lyon (CH)^{TH}	(France) Montpellier (RU)
(Sweden) Linköping (CH)	(Sweden) Rosengård (RU)	(England) Manchester City (CH)	(England) Chelsea (RU)
(Spain) Atlético Madrid (CH)	(Spain) Barcelona (RU)	(Russia) Rossiyanka (CH)	(Russia) Zvezda Perm (RU)
(Italy) Fiorentina (CH)	(Italy) Brescia (RU)	(Denmark) Brøndby (CH)	(Denmark) Fortuna Hjørring (RU)
(Czech Republic) Slavia Praha (CH)	(Czech Republic) Sparta Praha (RU)	(Austria) St. Pölten (CH)	(Scotland) Glasgow City (CH)
(Norway) Lillestrøm (CH)			
Qualifying round (Runners-up from associations 10–12 + Champions from associations 13–49)
(Austria) Sturm Graz (RU)	(Scotland) Hibernian (RU)	(Norway) Avaldsnes (RU)	(Switzerland) Zürich (RU)
(Netherlands) Ajax (CH)	(Kazakhstan) BIIK Kazygurt (CH)	(Cyprus) Apollon Limassol (CH)	(Belgium) Standard Liège (CH)
(Poland) Medyk Konin (CH)	(Iceland) Stjarnan (CH)	(Romania) Olimpia Cluj (CH)	(Serbia) Spartak Subotica (CH)
(Hungary) MTK Hungária (CH)	(Finland) PK-35 Vantaa (CH)	(Turkey) Konak Belediyespor (CH)	(Republic of Ireland) Shelbourne (CH)
(Bosnia and Herzegovina) SFK 2000 (CH)	(Portugal) Sporting CP (CH)	(Lithuania) Gintra Universitetas (CH)	(Belarus) FC Minsk (CH)
(Ukraine) Zhytlobud-2 Kharkiv (CH)	(Slovenia) Olimpija Ljubljana (CH)	(Croatia) Osijek (CH)	(Greece) PAOK (CH)
(Israel) Kiryat Gat (CH)	(Bulgaria) NSA Sofia (CH)	(Estonia) Pärnu (CH)	(Slovakia) Partizán Bardejov (CH)
(Northern Ireland) Linfield (CH)	(Faroe Islands) KÍ Klaksvík (CH)	(North Macedonia) Istatov (CH)	(Wales) Swansea City (CH)
(Albania) Vllaznia (CH)	(Latvia) Rīgas FS (CH)	(Montenegro) Breznica Pljevlja (CH)	(Malta) Birkirkara (CH)
(Moldova) Noroc Nimoreni (CH)	(Luxembourg) Bettembourg (CH)	(Kosovo) Hajvalia (CH)	(Georgia (country)) Martve (CH)

Notes

1. Switzerland (SUI): The Swiss champions FC Neunkirch announced their withdrawal from the league after the season, and so the berth was given to the runners-up Zürich.

== Round and draw dates ==
UEFA has scheduled the competition as follows (all draws are held at the UEFA headquarters in Nyon, Switzerland).

Round	Draw	First leg	Second leg
Qualifying round	23 June 2017	22–28 August 2017	
Round of 32	1 September 2017	4–5 October 2017	11–12 October 2017
Round of 16	16 October 2017	8–9 November 2017	15–16 November 2017
Quarter-finals	24 November 2017	21–22 March 2018	28–29 March 2018
Semi-finals	24 November 2017	21–22 April 2018	28–29 April 2018
Final	24 November 2017	24 May 2018 at Valeriy Lobanovskyi Dynamo Stadium, Kyiv	

== Qualifying round ==
The draw of the qualifying round was held on 23 June 2017, 13:30 CEST, at the UEFA headquarters in Nyon, Switzerland. The 40 teams were allocated into four seeding positions based on their UEFA club coefficients at the beginning of the season. They were drawn into ten groups of four containing one team from each of the four seeding positions. First, the ten teams which were pre-selected as hosts were drawn from their own designated pot and allocated to their respective group as per their seeding positions. Next, the remaining 30 teams were drawn from their respective pot which were allocated according to their seeding positions.

In each group, teams played against each other in a round-robin mini-tournament at the pre-selected hosts. The ten group winners and the runners-up with the best record against the teams finishing first and third in their group advanced to the round of 32 to join the 21 teams which received a bye.

The matches were played on 22, 25 and 28 August 2017.

Tiebreakers
Teams were ranked according to points (3 points for a win, 1 point for a draw, 0 points for a loss), and if tied on points, the following tiebreaking criteria were applied, in the order given, to determine the rankings (Regulations Articles 14.01 and 14.02):
1. Points in head-to-head matches among tied teams;
2. Goal difference in head-to-head matches among tied teams;
3. Goals scored in head-to-head matches among tied teams;
4. If more than two teams are tied, and after applying all head-to-head criteria above, a subset of teams are still tied, all head-to-head criteria above are reapplied exclusively to this subset of teams;
5. Goal difference in all group matches;
6. Goals scored in all group matches;
7. Penalty shoot-out if only two teams have the same number of points, and they met in the last round of the group and are tied after applying all criteria above (not used if more than two teams have the same number of points, or if their rankings are not relevant for qualification for the next stage);
8. Disciplinary points (red card = 3 points, yellow card = 1 point, expulsion for two yellow cards in one match = 3 points);
9. UEFA club coefficient.

To determine the best runner-up, the results against the teams in fourth place were discarded. The following criteria were applied (Regulations Article 14.03):

1. Points;
2. Goal difference;
3. Goals scored;
4. Disciplinary points;
5. UEFA club coefficient.

=== Group 1 ===
Pos	Team	Pld	W	D	L	GF	GA	GD	Pts	Qualification	GIN	BEL	BAR	MAR
1	(Lithuania) Gintra Universitetas	3	3	0	0	13	1	+12	9	Round of 32	—	—	4–0	6–0
2	(Turkey) Konak Belediyespor	3	2	0	1	11	4	+7	6		1–3	—	—	5–0
3	(Slovakia) Partizán Bardejov	3	1	0	2	4	9	−5	3		—	1–5	—	—
4	(Georgia (country)) Martve (H)	3	0	0	3	0	14	−14	0		—	—	0–3	—

Source: UEFA
(H) Hosts

=== Group 2 ===
Pos	Team	Pld	W	D	L	GF	GA	GD	Pts	Qualification	CLU	HIB	KHA	SWA
1	(Romania) Olimpia Cluj (H)	3	2	1	0	5	1	+4	7	Round of 32	—	—	1–0	3–0
2	(Scotland) Hibernian	3	1	2	0	7	2	+5	5		1–1	—	—	5–0
3	(Ukraine) Zhytlobud-2 Kharkiv	3	1	1	1	10	2	+8	4		—	1–1	—	—
4	(Wales) Swansea City	3	0	0	3	0	17	−17	0		—	—	0–9	—

Source: UEFA
(H) Hosts

=== Group 3 ===
Pos	Team	Pld	W	D	L	GF	GA	GD	Pts	Qualification	AJA	LIE	PÄR	RIG
1	(Netherlands) Ajax	3	3	0	0	11	1	+10	9	Round of 32	—	3–0	—	6–0
2	(Belgium) Standard Liège	3	2	0	1	10	3	+7	6		—	—	2–0	8–0
3	(Estonia) Pärnu (H)	3	1	0	2	3	4	−1	3		1–2	—	—	—
4	(Latvia) Rīgas FS	3	0	0	3	0	16	−16	0		—	—	0–2	—

Source: UEFA
(H) Hosts

=== Group 4 ===
Pos	Team	Pld	W	D	L	GF	GA	GD	Pts	Qualification	KON	SHE	VAN	LIN
1	(Poland) Medyk Konin	3	2	1	0	6	2	+4	7	Round of 32	—	0–0	—	4–1
2	(Republic of Ireland) Shelbourne	3	1	2	0	3	1	+2	5		—	—	0–0	—
3	(Finland) PK-35 Vantaa	3	1	1	1	2	2	0	4		1–2	—	—	1–0
4	(Northern Ireland) Linfield (H)	3	0	0	3	2	8	−6	0		—	1–3	—	—

Source: UEFA
(H) Hosts

=== Group 5 ===
Pos	Team	Pld	W	D	L	GF	GA	GD	Pts	Qualification	LIM	GRA	SOF	NIM
1	(Cyprus) Apollon Limassol (H)	3	3	0	0	14	1	+13	9	Round of 32	—	—	4–0	6–0
2	(Austria) Sturm Graz	3	2	0	1	8	5	+3	6		1–4	—	—	4–0
3	(Bulgaria) NSA Sofia	3	1	0	2	2	7	−5	3		—	1–3	—	—
4	(Moldova) Noroc Nimoreni	3	0	0	3	0	11	−11	0		—	—	0–1	—

Source: UEFA
(H) Hosts

=== Group 6 ===
Pos	Team	Pld	W	D	L	GF	GA	GD	Pts	Qualification	MIN	ZÜR	LJU	BIR
1	(Belarus) FC Minsk	3	2	1	0	13	0	+13	7	Round of 32	—	0–0	—	8–0
2	(Switzerland) Zürich	3	2	1	0	7	1	+6	7	Round of 32	—	—	2–1	5–0
3	(Slovenia) Olimpija Ljubljana (H)	3	1	0	2	2	7	−5	3		0–5	—	—	—
4	(Malta) Birkirkara	3	0	0	3	0	14	−14	0		—	—	0–1	—

Source: UEFA
(H) Hosts

=== Group 7 ===
Pos	Team	Pld	W	D	L	GF	GA	GD	Pts	Qualification	STJ	OSI	KLA	IST
1	(Iceland) Stjarnan	3	3	0	0	21	0	+21	9	Round of 32	—	—	9–0	11–0
2	(Croatia) Osijek (H)	3	2	0	1	11	1	+10	6		0–1	—	—	7–0
3	(Faroe Islands) KÍ Klaksvík	3	1	0	2	6	14	−8	3		—	0–4	—	—
4	(North Macedonia) Istatov	3	0	0	3	1	24	−23	0		—	—	1–6	—

Source: UEFA
(H) Hosts

=== Group 8 ===
Pos	Team	Pld	W	D	L	GF	GA	GD	Pts	Qualification	KAZ	SPO	HUN	HAJ
1	(Kazakhstan) BIIK Kazygurt	3	3	0	0	6	1	+5	9	Round of 32	—	2–1	—	1–0
2	(Portugal) Sporting CP	3	2	0	1	7	3	+4	6		—	—	2–0	—
3	(Hungary) MTK Hungária (H)	3	1	0	2	2	5	−3	3		0–3	—	—	2–0
4	(Kosovo) Hajvalia	3	0	0	3	1	7	−6	0		—	1–4	—	—

Source: UEFA
(H) Hosts

=== Group 9 ===
Pos	Team	Pld	W	D	L	GF	GA	GD	Pts	Qualification	AVA	SUB	PLJ	KIR
1	(Norway) Avaldsnes	3	3	0	0	10	3	+7	9	Round of 32	—	2–0	2–1	—
2	(Serbia) Spartak Subotica	3	2	0	1	13	3	+10	6		—	—	6–0	7–1
3	(Montenegro) Breznica Pljevlja (H)	3	0	1	2	3	10	−7	1		—	—	—	2–2
4	(Israel) Kiryat Gat	3	0	1	2	5	15	−10	1		2–6	—	—	—

Source: UEFA
(H) Hosts

=== Group 10 ===
Pos	Team	Pld	W	D	L	GF	GA	GD	Pts	Qualification	PAO	VLL	SFK	BET
1	(Greece) PAOK	3	3	0	0	12	0	+12	9	Round of 32	—	—	3–0	8–0
2	(Albania) Vllaznia	3	2	0	1	3	1	+2	6		0–1	—	—	—
3	(Bosnia and Herzegovina) SFK 2000 (H)	3	1	0	2	3	4	−1	3		—	0–1	—	3–0
4	(Luxembourg) Bettembourg	3	0	0	3	0	13	−13	0		—	0–2	—	—

Source: UEFA
(H) Hosts

=== Ranking of second-placed teams ===
To determine the best second-placed team from the qualifying round which advanced to the knockout phase, only the results of the second-placed teams against the first and third-placed teams in their group were taken into account, while results against the fourth-placed team were not included. As a result, two matches played by each second-placed team counted for the purposes of determining the ranking.

Pos	Grp	Team	Pld	W	D	L	GF	GA	GD	Pts	Qualification
1	6	(Switzerland) Zürich	2	1	1	0	2	1	+1	4	Round of 32
2	9	(Serbia) Spartak Subotica	2	1	0	1	6	2	+4	3	
3	7	(Croatia) Osijek	2	1	0	1	4	1	+3	3	
4	1	(Turkey) Konak Belediyespor	2	1	0	1	6	4	+2	3	
5	8	(Portugal) Sporting CP	2	1	0	1	3	2	+1	3	
6	10	(Albania) Vllaznia	2	1	0	1	1	1	0	3	
7	5	(Austria) Sturm Graz	2	1	0	1	4	5	−1	3	
8	3	(Belgium) Standard Liège	2	1	0	1	2	3	−1	3	
9	2	(Scotland) Hibernian	2	0	2	0	2	2	0	2	
10	4	(Republic of Ireland) Shelbourne	2	0	2	0	0	0	0	2	

Source: UEFA

== Knockout phase ==
In the knockout phase, teams played against each other over two legs on a home-and-away basis, except for the one-match final. If the aggregate score was tied after full time of the second leg, the away goals rule was used to decide the winners. If still tied, extra time is played. The away goals rule was again used after extra time, i.e. if there are goals scored during extra time and the aggregate score was still tied after extra time, the away team of the second leg advanced by virtue of more away goals scored. If no goals were scored during extra time, the match was decided by penalty shoot-out. In the final, which was played as a single match, if the score was tied after full time, extra time was played, followed by penalty shoot-out if the score was still tied after extra time.

The mechanism of the draws for each round is as follows:

- In the draw for the round of 32, the sixteen teams with the highest UEFA club coefficients were seeded (with the title holders being the automatic top seed), and the other sixteen teams are unseeded. The seeded teams are drawn against the unseeded teams, with the seeded teams hosting the second leg. Teams from the same association or the same qualifying round group cannot be drawn against each other.
- In the draw for the round of 16, the eight teams with the highest UEFA club coefficients are seeded (with the title holders being the automatic top seed should they qualify), and the other eight teams are unseeded. The seeded teams are drawn against the unseeded teams, with the order of legs decided by draw. Teams from the same association cannot be drawn against each other.
- In the draws for the quarter-finals and semi-finals, there are no seedings, and teams from the same association can be drawn against each other. As the draws for the quarter-finals and semi-finals are held together before the quarter-finals are played, the identity of the teams in the semi-finals are not known at the time of the draw. A draw is also held to determine the "home" team for the final (for administrative purposes as it is played at a neutral venue).

=== Bracket ===
Round of 32
(Netherlands) Ajax	1	0	1
(Italy) Brescia	0	2	2
(France) Montpellier	0	2	2
(Russia) Zvezda Perm	1	0	1
(England) Chelsea (a)	1	1	2
(Germany) Bayern Munich	0	2	2
(Romania) Olimpia Cluj	0	0	0
(Sweden) Rosengård	1	4	5
(Italy) Fiorentina	2	0	2
(Denmark) Fortuna Hjørring	1	0	1
(Spain) Atlético Madrid	0	2	2
(Germany) Wolfsburg	3	12	15
(Iceland) Stjarnan	1	4	5
(Russia) Rossiyanka	1	0	1
(Belarus) FC Minsk	1	3	4
(Czech Republic) Slavia Praha	3	4	7
(Norway) Lillestrøm	0	3	3
(Denmark) Brøndby	0	1	1
(Austria) St. Pölten	0	0	0
(England) Manchester City	3	3	6
(Greece) PAOK	0	0	0
(Czech Republic) Sparta Praha	5	3	8
(Cyprus) Apollon Limassol	0	0	0
(Sweden) Linköping	1	3	4
(Kazakhstan) BIIK Kazygurt (a)	3	1	4
(Scotland) Glasgow City	0	4	4
(Poland) Medyk Konin	0	0	0
(France) Lyon	5	9	14
(Lithuania) Gintra Universitetas	1	2	3
(Switzerland) Zürich	1	1	2
(Norway) Avaldsnes	0	0	0
(Spain) Barcelona	4	2	6

Round of 16
(Italy) Brescia	2	0	2
(France) Montpellier	3	6	9
(England) Chelsea	3	1	4
(Sweden) Rosengård	0	0	0
(Italy) Fiorentina	0	3	3
(Germany) Wolfsburg	4	3	7
(Iceland) Stjarnan	1	0	1
(Czech Republic) Slavia Praha	2	0	2
(Norway) Lillestrøm	0	1	1
(England) Manchester City	5	2	7
(Czech Republic) Sparta Praha	1	0	1
(Sweden) Linköping	1	3	4
(Kazakhstan) BIIK Kazygurt	0	0	0
(France) Lyon	7	9	16
(Lithuania) Gintra Universitetas	0	0	0
(Spain) Barcelona	6	3	9

Quarter-finals
(France) Montpellier	0	1	1
(England) Chelsea	2	3	5
(Germany) Wolfsburg	5	1	6
(Czech Republic) Slavia Praha	0	1	1
(England) Manchester City	2	5	7
(Sweden) Linköping	0	3	3
(France) Lyon	2	1	3
(Spain) Barcelona	1	0	1

Semi-finals
(England) Chelsea	1	0	1
(Germany) Wolfsburg	3	2	5
(England) Manchester City	0	0	0
(France) Lyon	0	1	1

Final
24 May – Kyiv
(Germany) Wolfsburg	1
(France) Lyon (a.e.t.)	4

=== Round of 32 ===
The draw for the round of 32 was held on 1 September 2017, 13:30 CEST, at the UEFA headquarters in Nyon, Switzerland. The first legs were played on 4 and 5 October, and the second legs on 11 and 12 October 2017.

Team 1	Agg.	Team 2	1st leg	2nd leg
Stjarnan (Iceland)	5–1	(Russia) Rossiyanka	1–1	4–0
Fiorentina (Italy)	2–1	(Denmark) Fortuna Hjørring	2–1	0–0
Apollon Limassol (Cyprus)	0–4	(Sweden) Linköping	0–1	0–3
Montpellier (France)	2–1	(Russia) Zvezda Perm	0–1	2–0
BIIK Kazygurt (Kazakhstan)	4–4 (a)	(Scotland) Glasgow City	3–0	1–4
Gintra Universitetas (Lithuania)	3–2	(Switzerland) Zürich	1–1	2–1
Atlético Madrid (Spain)	2–15	(Germany) Wolfsburg	0–3	2–12
Lillestrøm (Norway)	3–1	(Denmark) Brøndby	0–0	3–1
Ajax (Netherlands)	1–2	(Italy) Brescia	1–0	0–2
St. Pölten (Austria)	0–6	(England) Manchester City	0–3	0–3
Chelsea (England)	2–2 (a)	(Germany) Bayern Munich	1–0	1–2
FC Minsk (Belarus)	4–7	(Czech Republic) Slavia Praha	1–3	3–4
Medyk Konin (Poland)	0–14	(France) Lyon	0–5	0–9
PAOK (Greece)	0–8	(Czech Republic) Sparta Praha	0–5	0–3
Olimpia Cluj (Romania)	0–5	(Sweden) Rosengård	0–1	0–4
Avaldsnes (Norway)	0–6	(Spain) Barcelona	0–4	0–2

=== Round of 16 ===
The draw for the round of 16 was held on 16 October 2017, 13:30 CEST, at the UEFA headquarters in Nyon, Switzerland. The first legs were played on 8 and 9 November and the second legs on 15 and 16 November 2017.

Team 1	Agg.	Team 2	1st leg	2nd leg
Sparta Praha (Czech Republic)	1–4	(Sweden) Linköping	1–1	0–3
Gintra Universitetas (Lithuania)	0–9	(Spain) Barcelona	0–6	0–3
Chelsea (England)	4–0	(Sweden) Rosengård	3–0	1–0
Lillestrøm (Norway)	1–7	(England) Manchester City	0–5	1–2
Brescia (Italy)	2–9	(France) Montpellier	2–3	0–6
BIIK Kazygurt (Kazakhstan)	0–16	(France) Lyon	0–7	0–9
Fiorentina (Italy)	3–7	(Germany) Wolfsburg	0–4	3–3
Stjarnan (Iceland)	1–2	(Czech Republic) Slavia Praha	1–2	0–0

=== Quarter-finals ===
The draw for the quarter-finals was held on 24 November 2017, 13:30 CET, at the UEFA headquarters in Nyon, Switzerland. The first legs were played on 21 and 22 March, and the second legs on 28 March 2018.

Team 1	Agg.	Team 2	1st leg	2nd leg
Montpellier (France)	1–5	(England) Chelsea	0–2	1–3
Wolfsburg (Germany)	6–1	(Czech Republic) Slavia Praha	5–0	1–1
Manchester City (England)	7–3	(Sweden) Linköping	2–0	5–3
Lyon (France)	3–1	(Spain) Barcelona	2–1	1–0

=== Semi-finals ===
The draw for the semi-finals was held on 24 November 2017, 13:30 CET (together with the quarter-final draw), at the UEFA headquarters in Nyon, Switzerland. The first legs were played on 22 April, and the second legs on 29 April 2018.

Team 1	Agg.	Team 2	1st leg	2nd leg
Chelsea (England)	1–5	(Germany) Wolfsburg	1–3	0–2
Manchester City (England)	0–1	(France) Lyon	0–0	0–1

=== Final ===
The final was played at the Valeriy Lobanovskyi Dynamo Stadium in Kyiv on 24 May 2018. The "home" team for the final (for administrative purposes) was determined by an additional draw held after the quarter-final and semi-final draws.

24 May 2018
19:00 UTC+3

Wolfsburg (Germany)	1–4 (a.e.t.)	(France) Lyon
Harder 93'	Report	Henry 98'; Le Sommer 99'; Hegerberg 103'; Abily 116'

Valeriy Lobanovskyi Dynamo Stadium, Kyiv
Attendance: 14,237
Referee: Jana Adámková (Czech Republic)

== Statistics ==
Notes

- — denotes the team did not participate in this stage.

=== Top goalscorers ===
Qualifying goals count towards the topscorer award. The 15 goals scored by Ada Hegerberg was a new competition record.

Rank	Player	Team	Goals		
Rank	Player	Team	Qual	Tourn	Total
1	(Norway) Ada Hegerberg	(France) Lyon	—	15	15
2	(Denmark) Pernille Harder	(Germany) Wolfsburg	—	8	8
3	(Iceland) Katrín Ásbjörnsdóttir	(Iceland) Stjarnan	5	2	7
4	(France) Camille Abily	(France) Lyon	—	6	6
4	(Namibia) Zenatha Coleman	(Lithuania) Gintra Universitetas	3	3	6
4	(Iceland) Sara Björk Gunnarsdóttir	(Germany) Wolfsburg	—	6	6
4	(Turkey) Kader Hançar	(Turkey) Konak Belediyespor	6	—	6
4	(Ukraine) Tamila Khimich	(Belarus) FC Minsk	4	2	6
9	(England) Rosella Ayane	(Cyprus) Apollon Limassol	5	0	5
9	(Jamaica) Donna-Kay Henry	(Iceland) Stjarnan	5	0	5
9	(Czech Republic) Kateřina Svitková	(Czech Republic) Slavia Praha	—	5	5

Source: UEFA

=== Squad of the season ===
The UEFA technical study group selected the following 18 players as the squad of the tournament:

Pos.	Player	Team
GK	(Spain) Sandra Paños	(Spain) Barcelona
GK	(Germany) Almuth Schult	(Germany) VfL Wolfsburg
DF	(England) Lucy Bronze	(France) Lyon
DF	(England) Steph Houghton	(England) Manchester City
DF	(France) Amel Majri	(France) Lyon
DF	(France) Griedge Mbock Bathy	(France) Lyon
DF	(France) Wendie Renard	(France) Lyon
MF	(France) Amandine Henry	(France) Lyon
MF	(South Korea) Ji So-yun	(England) Chelsea
MF	(Japan) Saki Kumagai	(France) Lyon
MF	(Germany) Dzsenifer Marozsán	(France) Lyon
MF	(England) Georgia Stanway	(England) Manchester City
FW	(Denmark) Pernille Harder	(Germany) VfL Wolfsburg
FW	(Norway) Ada Hegerberg	(France) Lyon
FW	(England) Fran Kirby	(England) Chelsea
FW	(Netherlands) Lieke Martens	(Spain) Barcelona
FW	(France) Eugénie Le Sommer	(France) Lyon
FW	(Poland) Ewa Pajor	(Germany) VfL Wolfsburg

== See also ==
- 2017–18 UEFA Champions League
