= Beverly Leon =

American footballer

Personal information
- Date of birth: April 23, 1992 (age 34)
- Place of birth: Wrentham, Massachusetts, United States
- Height: 1.73 m (5 ft 8 in)
- Position: Midfielder

College career
Years	Team	Apps	(Gls)
2010–2013	Columbia Lions	66	(17)

Senior career*
Years	Team	Apps	(Gls)
2015	Stjarnan	2	(0)
2016–2018	Sunderland	11	(5)
- * Club domestic league appearances and goals as of May 23, 2022

Beverly Leon is a former American footballer and entrepreneur. She played as a midfielder for Sunderland in the FA Women's Super League. She previously played for the Icelandic Stjarnan club.

== Biography ==
Leon grew up in Wrentham, Massachusetts, and attended Milton Academy, where she was Boston Globe Player of the Year, and the recipient of Milton's Priscilla Bailey Award for demonstrating "exceptional individual skills and teamwork as well as sportsmanship."

Leon then attended Columbia University and played for Columbia's varsity women's soccer team. After graduating from Columbia in 2014, Leon worked for Morgan Stanley in the global capital markets division.

After a year at Morgan Stanley, Leon played for Stjarnan women's football and then signed to play for Sunderland A.F.C. Ladies as a midfielder. She was the top scorer in the team's 2017 Spring Series.

Leon then pursued her education at Green Templeton College, Oxford and Columbia Business School. In 2018, she founded Local Civics, which is a startup that uses game-based learning to encourage kids to strengthen their civic leadership skills. Leon was named to the 2022 Forbes 30 Under 30 list.
