= Anna María Baldursdóttir =

Icelandic footballer

Personal information
- Full name: Anna María Baldursdóttir
- Date of birth: August 28, 1994 (age 32)(30 years old 2024)
- Place of birth: Iceland
- Height: 5 ft 9 in (1.75 m)
- Position: Defender

Team information
- Current team: Stjarnan
- Number: 10

College career
Years	Team	Apps	(Gls)
2015–2016	St. John's Red Storm	40	(3)

Senior career*
Years	Team	Apps	(Gls)
2010–	stjarnan.is	169	(2)

International career^{‡}
2012–2017	Iceland	9	(0)
- * Club domestic league appearances and goals as of 20:47, 14 June 2021 (UTC) ‡ National team caps and goals as of 20:47, 14 June 2021 (UTC)

Anna María Baldursdóttir (born 28 August 1994) is an Icelandic football defender who plays for Stjarnan of the Úrvalsdeild. She has also played for the Iceland women's national football team.

== College career ==
In 2015 Anna María began studying at St. John's University in New York City and playing college soccer for the "Red Storm". In a two-year stint she started 39 of her 40 appearances and scored two goals.

== Club career ==
Anna María developed into an important defender at her first club, Stjarnan. She signed a new three-year contract in October 2018. In 2020, Stjarnan club captain Anna María missed much of the season with a torn thigh muscle but returned in September.

== International career ==
Anna María won her first senior cap for the Iceland women's national football team on 2 March 2012, as an 86th-minute substitute for Mist Edvardsdóttir in a 4–1 defeat by Sweden at the 2012 Algarve Cup. She had been called up to the squad by coach Sigurður Ragnar Eyjólfsson as a late replacement for Sif Atladóttir, who was injured. She was named as one of eight players on standby for the Iceland squad at UEFA Women's Euro 2017.

== Honours ==
Stjarnan

- Úrvalsdeild (4): 2011, 2013, 2014, 2016
- Icelandic Women's Cup (3): 2012, 2014, 2015
- Icelandic League Cup A (3): 2013, 2014, 2015
- Icelandic Super Cup (2): 2012, 2015
