= 2016 Úrvalsdeild kvenna (football) =

Úrvalsdeild (women)
- Season: 2016
- Champions: Stjarnan
- Relegated: ÍA Akranes; Selfoss
- UEFA Women's Champions League: Stjarnan
- Matches: 90
- Goals: 263 (2.92 per match)
- Top goalscorer: Harpa Þorsteinsdóttir (20 goals)

The 2016 Úrvalsdeild kvenna was the 45th season of the women's football top-level league in Iceland.

Stjarnan won the title and thus their fourth championship.

== Standings ==
| Pos | Team | Pld | W | D | L | GF | GA | GD | Pts | Qualification or relegation |
|---|---|---|---|---|---|---|---|---|---|---|
| 1 | Stjarnan (C, Q) | 18 | 14 | 2 | 2 | 46 | 11 | +35 | 44 | 2017–18 UEFA Women's Champions League |
| 2 | Breiðablik | 18 | 11 | 6 | 1 | 35 | 8 | +27 | 39 | |
| 3 | Valur | 18 | 12 | 3 | 3 | 38 | 17 | +21 | 39 | |
| 4 | Þór/KA | 18 | 9 | 6 | 3 | 38 | 21 | +17 | 33 | |
| 5 | ÍBV | 18 | 10 | 1 | 7 | 34 | 23 | +11 | 31 | |
| 6 | Fimleikafélag Hafnarfjarðar | 18 | 5 | 2 | 11 | 12 | 38 | −26 | 17 | |
| 7 | KR | 18 | 4 | 3 | 11 | 17 | 39 | −22 | 15 | |
| 8 | Fylkir | 18 | 3 | 5 | 10 | 14 | 35 | −21 | 14 | |
| 9 | Selfoss (R) | 18 | 3 | 4 | 11 | 18 | 35 | −17 | 13 | Relegation to 1. deild kvenna |
| 10 | ÍA Akranes (R) | 18 | 2 | 2 | 14 | 11 | 36 | −25 | 8 | Relegation to 1. deild kvenna |

Source: soccerway.com
Rules for classification: 1) Points; 2) Goal difference; 3) Number of goals scored; 4) Head-to-head points; 5) Head-to-head goal difference; 6) Head-to-head away goals scored
(C) Champions; (Q) Qualified for the phase indicated; (R) Relegated

== Top scorers ==
As of 30 September 2016.

| Rank | Player | Club | Goals |
|---|---|---|---|
| 1 | (Iceland) Harpa Þorsteinsdóttir | Stjarnan | 20 |
| 2 | (Iceland) Margrét Lára Viðarsdóttir | Valur | 14 |
| 3 | (Iceland) Berglind Björg Þorvaldsdóttir | Breiðablik | 12 |
| 4 | (Mexico) Stephany Mayor | Þór/KA | 11 |
| 4 | (Canada) Cloé Lacasse | ÍBV | 11 |
| 6 | (Iceland) Sandra Jessen | Þór/KA | 9 |
| 7 | (Iceland) Katrín Ásbjörnsdóttir | Stjarnan | 7 |
| 8 | (United States) Megan Dunnigan | ÍA Akranes | 6 |
| 8 | (Canada) Lauren Hughes | Selfoss | 6 |
| 8 | (Iceland) Fanndís Friðriksdóttir | Breiðablik | 6 |
