= Stjarnan (women's football) =

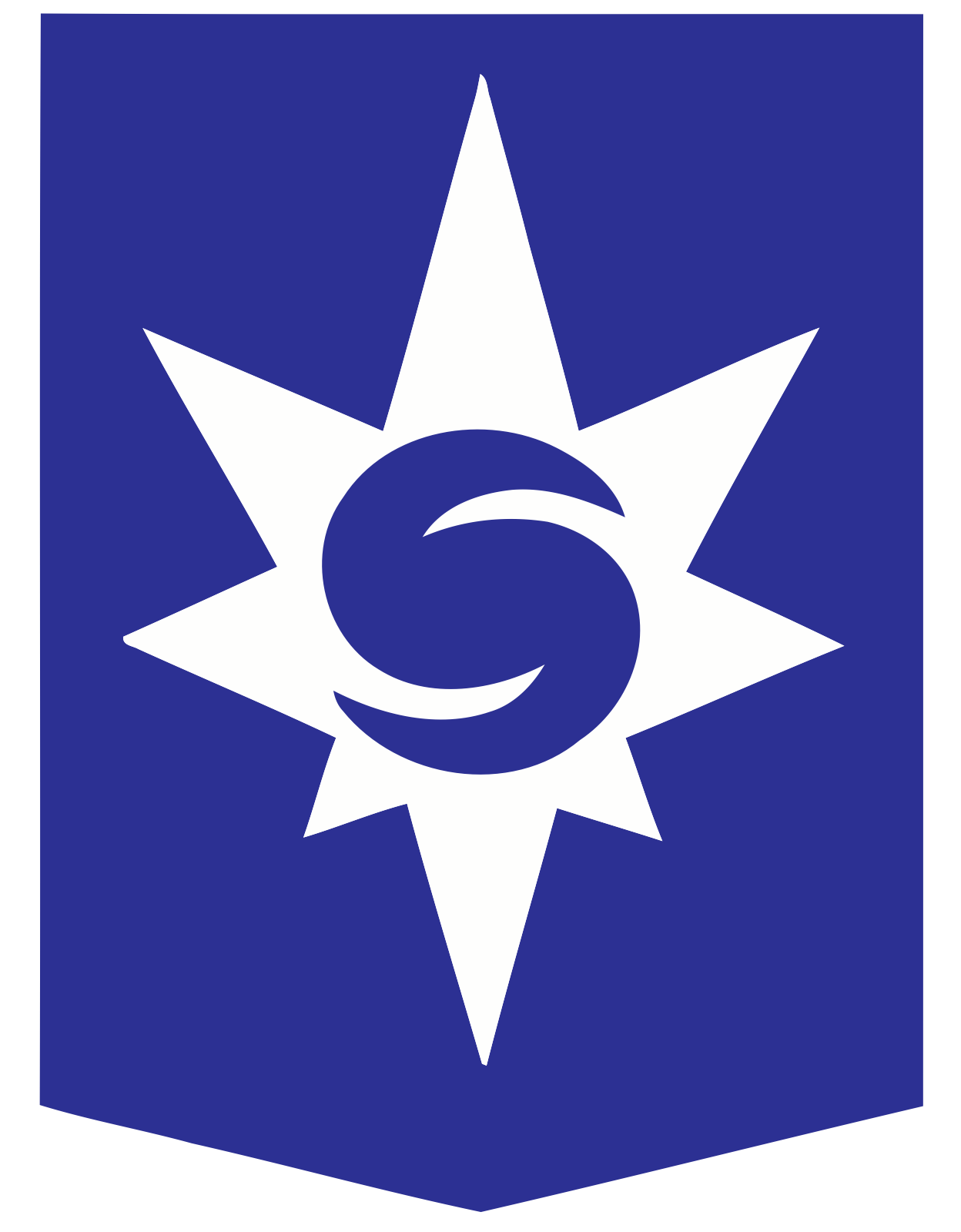
- Full name: Ungmennafélag Stjarnan
- Ground: Samsung völlurinn, Garðabær, Iceland
- Capacity: 1,298
- Head Coach: Kristján Gudmundsson
- League: Besta deild kvenna
- 2025: 4th
- Website: stjarnan.is/pages/meistaraflokkur-kvenna/
Home colours	Away colours

The Stjarnan women's football team is the women's football department of the Ungmennafélagið Stjarnan multi-sport club. It is based in Garðabær, Iceland, and currently plays in the Besta deild kvenna, the top-tier women's football league in Iceland. The team plays its home games at the Samsung völlurinn located in Garðabær. The team's colors are blue and white. Stjarnan has won the Icelandic championship four times and also the Icelandic Women's Cup in 2012, 2014 and 2015.

== Current squad ==
As of 9 May 2022.

Note: Flags indicate national team as defined under FIFA eligibility rules; some limited exceptions apply. Players may hold more than one non-FIFA nationality.

No.	Pos.	Nation	Player
1	GK	GUY	Chanté Sandiford
2	DF	ISL	Sóley Guðmundsdóttir
3	DF	ISL	Arna Dís Arnþórsdóttir
5	MF	ISL	Eyrún Embla Hjartardóttir
6	MF	ISL	Úlfa Úlfarsdóttir
8	DF	ISL	Ingibjörg Ragnarsdóttir
9	DF	USA	Alexa Kirton
10	DF	ISL	Anna Baldursdóttir
13	DF	ISL	Ólína Ágústa Valdimarsdóttir
14	MF	ISL	Snædis Maria Jörundsdóttir
15	FW	ISL	Alma Mathiesen

No.	Pos.	Nation	Player
16	DF	ISL	Sædis Rún Heiðarsdóttir
17	MF	ISL	Mist Smáradóttir
18	FW	ISL	Jasmín Erla Ingadóttir
20	GK	ISL	Aníta Ólafsdóttir
21	MF	ISL	Heiða Ragney
23	MF	ISL	Gyða Kristin Gunnarsdóttir
24	DF	ISL	Málfriður Sigurðardótir
25	MF	ISL	Rakel Lóa Brynjarsdóttir
30	MF	ISL	Katrín Ásbjörnsdóttir
31	MF	ISL	Hildigunnur Ýr Benediktsdóttir

=== Former internationals ===
- Iceland: Katrín Ásbjörnsdóttir, Gunnhildur Yrsa Jónsdóttir, Glódís Perla Viggósdóttir
- Italy: Marta Carissimi
- Jamaica: Donna-Kay Henry
- Mexico: Verónica Pérez
- Nicaragua: Ana Cate
- Serbia: Danka Podovac
- Trinidad and Tobago: Ahkeela Mollon
- Tunisia: Imen Troudi

=== Former non-international professional players ===
- (United States) Kate Deines, Kristen Edmonds, Beverly Leon

== Record in UEFA Women's Champions League ==
Season	Round	Club	Home	Away	Aggregate
2012–13	Round of 32	(Russia) Zorky Krasnogorsk	0–0 ^{a}	1–3	1–3
2014–15	Round of 32	(Russia) Zvezda Perm	2–5 ^{a}	1–3	3–8
2015–16	Qualifying round	(Malta) Hibernians Paola	–	5–0	–
2015–16	Qualifying round	(Faroe Islands) Klaksvík	–	4–0	–
2015–16	Qualifying round	(Cyprus) Apollon Limassol (Host)	–	2–0	–
2015–16	Round of 32	(Russia) Zvezda Perm	1–3 ^{a}	1–3	2–6
2017–18	Qualifying round	(Faroe Islands) Klaksvík	–	9–0	–
2017–18	Qualifying round	(North Macedonia) Istatov	–	11–0	–
2017–18	Qualifying round	(Croatia) Osijek (Host)	–	1–0	–
2017–18	Round of 32	(Russia) Rossiyanka Khimki	1–1 ^{a}	4–0	5–1
2017–18	Round of 16	(Czech Republic) Slavia Prague	1–2 ^{a}	0–0	1–2
2023–24	Qualifying round 1	(Spain) Levante	–	0–4	–
2023–24	Qualifying round 1	(Austria) Sturm Graz	0–0 (a.e.t.) (7–6 p)	–	–

^{a} First leg.

== Trophies ==
- Besta deild kvenna
  - Winners (4): 2011, 2013, 2014, 2016
- Icelandic Cup
  - Winner: 2012, 2014, 2015
- Icelandic Super Cup
  - Winner: 2012, 2015

== Managers ==
- (Iceland) Ásgeir Heiðar Pálsson (Apr 1, 1984 – Dec 31, 1986)
- (Iceland) Erla Rafnsdóttir (Jan 1, 1987 – Dec 31, 1987)
- (Iceland) Helgi Thordarson (Jan 1, 1990 – Oct 16, 1993)
- (Iceland) Örnólfur Oddsson (Nov 1, 1993 – Apr 16, 1994)
- (Iceland) Ásgeir Heiðar Pálsson (Apr 16, 1994 – Oct 1, 1994)
- (Iceland) Jón Óttarr Karlsson (Oct 1, 1994 – Oct 16, 1995)
- (Iceland) Ólafur Guðbjörnsson (Jan 1, 2014–Dec 2018)
- (Iceland) Kristján Gudmundsson (Jan, 2019–)
