= Ada Hegerberg =

Norwegian footballer (born 1995)

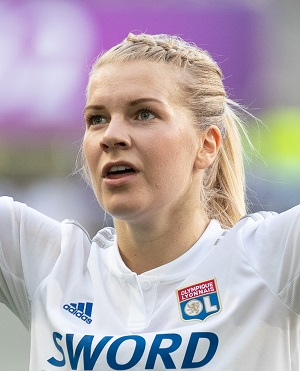
- Hegerberg in 2019

Personal information
- Full name: Ada Martine Stolsmo Hegerberg
- Date of birth: 10 July 1995 (age 31)
- Place of birth: Molde, Norway
- Height: 1.79 m (5 ft 10 in)
- Position: Striker

Team information
- Current team: Lyon
- Number: 14

Youth career
- Sunndal

Senior career*
Years	Team	Apps	(Gls)
2010–2011	Kolbotn	31	(15)
2011	Kolbotn 2	1	(0)
2012–2013	Stabæk	18	(24)
2013–2014	Turbine Potsdam	25	(11)
2014–	Lyon	192	(188)

International career^{‡}
2009–2010	Norway U15	3	(1)
2010	Norway U16	8	(7)
2010–2011	Norway U17	5	(3)
2011	Norway U19	12	(10)
2011–2012	Norway U20	9	(5)
2011–	Norway	101	(55)
Medal record
Women's football
Representing Norway
UEFA Women's Championship
Runner-up	2013 Sweden
- * Club domestic league appearances and goals as of 22 November 2026 ‡ National team caps and goals as of 9 October 2026

Ada Martine Stolsmo Hegerberg (born 10 July 1995) is a Norwegian professional footballer who plays as a striker for the Première Ligue club Lyon and captains the Norway national team. She is widely regarded as one of the best female footballers in the world.

Hegerberg has represented Norway at the youth international level, and made her debut for the senior team in 2011. In 2013, she was a part of the silver medalist team at the 2013 UEFA European Championship. She was on team Norway at the 2015 FIFA World Cup, the 2017 UEFA European Championship and the 2022 UEFA European Championship.

Hegerberg was awarded the 2016 UEFA Best Women's Player in Europe Award on 25 August 2016, and in 2017 and 2019 was named BBC Women's Footballer of the Year. In 2018 she was the first-ever recipient of the Ballon d'Or Féminin. She holds the record for most goals in a UEFA Women's Champions League season (15), and is currently the all-time highest goalscorer in UEFA Women's Champions League (69).

== Club career ==
=== Youth ===
Hegerberg was born in Molde, but grew up in Sunndalsøra where she played for Sunndal Fotball along with her older sister Andrine. In 2007, their family moved to Kolbotn, where the sisters later joined Kolbotn IL.

=== Kolbotn ===
She made her debut for Kolbotn in 2010. On 6 August 2011, she scored three goals in seven minutes as Røa were beaten 4–1, with Andrine scoring the last goal. Aged 16, this made her the youngest player ever to have scored a hat-trick in Toppserien. While still 16 years old, she finished as Kolbotn's top scorer in the 2011 Toppserien season and was voted as the league's Young Player of the Year.

=== Stabæk ===
Ahead of the 2012 season, both Hegerberg sisters joined Stabæk. During a match against Fart in May 2012, she scored five goals during the first half of Stabæk's 8–2 win. At this stage the sisters were considered to be two of the biggest talents in Norwegian women's football, and Ada won the Statoil "Talent of the Month" award for the second time in May 2012. She became top goalscorer in the 2012 Toppserien with 25 goals in 18 matches. She also contributed two goals in the semi-final of the 2012 Norwegian Women's Cup, when Amazon Grimstad were beaten 3–0. Stabæk's 4–0 final victory over Røa saw Hegerberg score a hat-trick.

=== Turbine Potsdam ===
In 2013, she and her sister signed contracts with the German side 1. FFC Turbine Potsdam until 30 June 2014, where they became teammates of their countrywoman Maren Mjelde. Hegerberg scored in her Bundesliga debut when SC Freiburg was beaten 3–1. In their first season in Germany, the Hegerbergs and Turbine finished second in both the 2012–13 Bundesliga and the 2012–13 DFB-Pokal.

=== Lyon ===
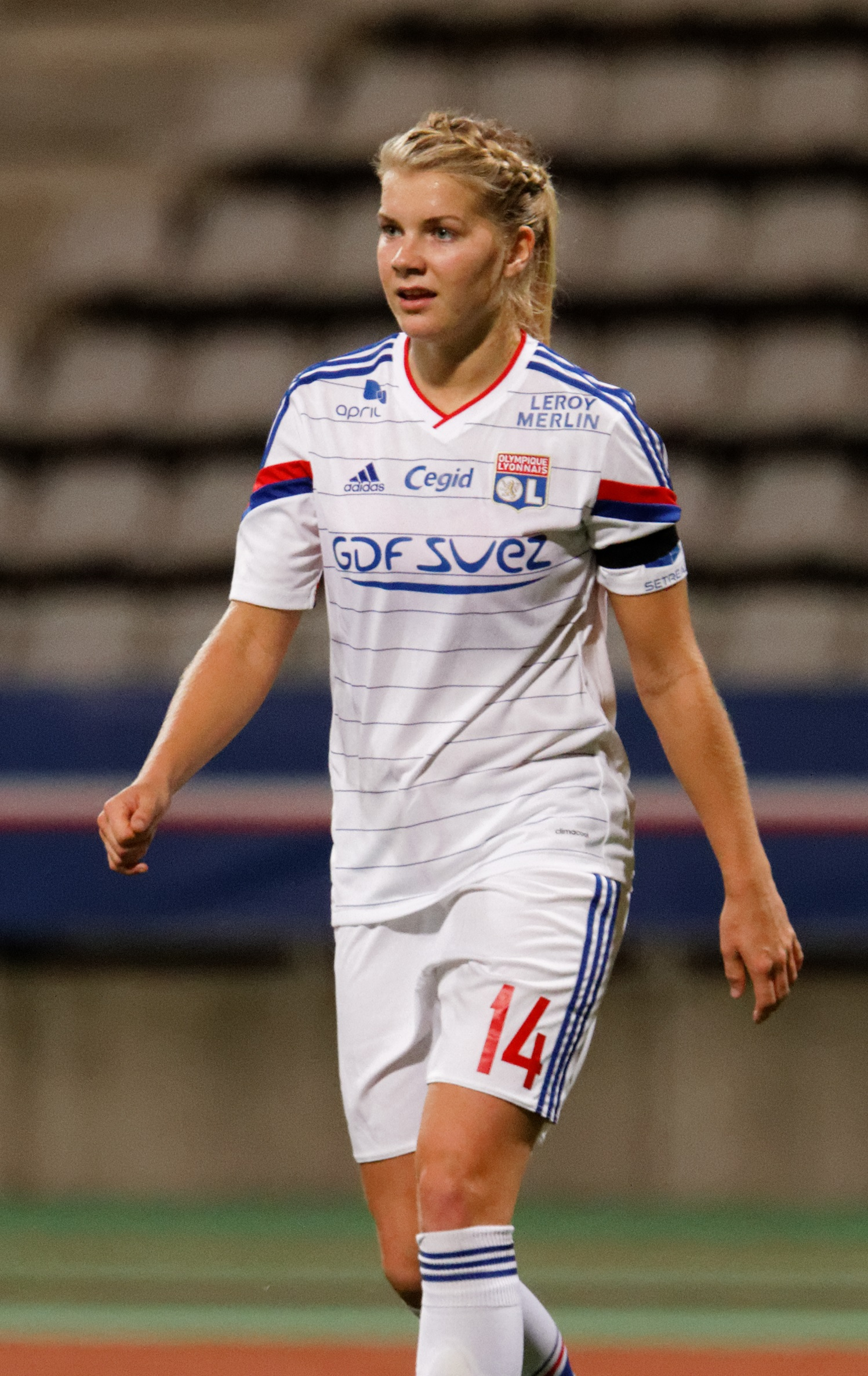
Hegerberg with Lyon in 2014

In the summer of 2014, she transferred to Lyon. Hegerberg had a very successful first season in France. She scored 26 goals in 22 league games, leading Lyon to a ninth consecutive Division 1 Féminine title. In the Coupe de France Féminine Final, Hegerberg scored the tying goal in the 47th minute, eventually culminating in a 2–1 victory over Montpellier.

2015–16 season

Hegerberg returned to Lyon for the 2015–16 campaign. On 27 September, she scored a hat-trick in Lyon's 5–0 victory against rival PSG. Hegerberg became the first player to score a hat-trick against PSG since Julie Morel in October 2008. In November, Hegerberg reached an agreement on a contract extension to stay with the club through the 2019 season. Lyon retained the league title for the tenth time in a row on 8 May 2016. Hegerberg finishing the season as the top scorer of the league with 33 goals in 21 appearances. One week later, Hegerberg secured the Coupe de France with Lyon. In UEFA Women's Champions League action, Lyon went on to win the competition behind Hegerberg's 13 goals in 9 matches, to complete a treble.

Ballon d'Or

On 3 December 2018, Hegerberg became the first ever winner of the Ballon d'Or Féminin. There was controversy during the ceremony, however, as the host, DJ Martin Solveig, asked Hegerberg upon receiving the award if she wanted to dance in celebration and "knew how to twerk", who in turn responded "no". His comments were criticized as sexist in the media; he later apologized for his remark. Regarding the incident, Hegerberg later commented: "He came to me afterwards and was really sad that it went that way. I didn’t really consider it sexual harassment or anything in the moment. I was just happy to do the dance and win the Ballon d’Or." Concerning her award, she also added: "It’s incredible. This is a great motivation to continue working hard and we will continue to work together to win more titles. I wanted to end with some words for young girls around the world: believe in yourselves." In a later interview, she said, "I know the importance of having role models to look up at," and called the decision of France Football to have a Ballon d'Or for women "a huge step forward".

2018–19 season

Head to head with Paris Saint-Germain all season long, Lyon crushed their rivals 5–0 on 13 April 2019, with a goal and an assist for Hegerberg, a major individual performance. Lyon secured the title ten days later. After scoring the only goal of the Coupe de France semi-final against Grenoble Foot 38, Hegerberg was involved in two of the three goals in the final against Lille OSC, winning yet another competition.

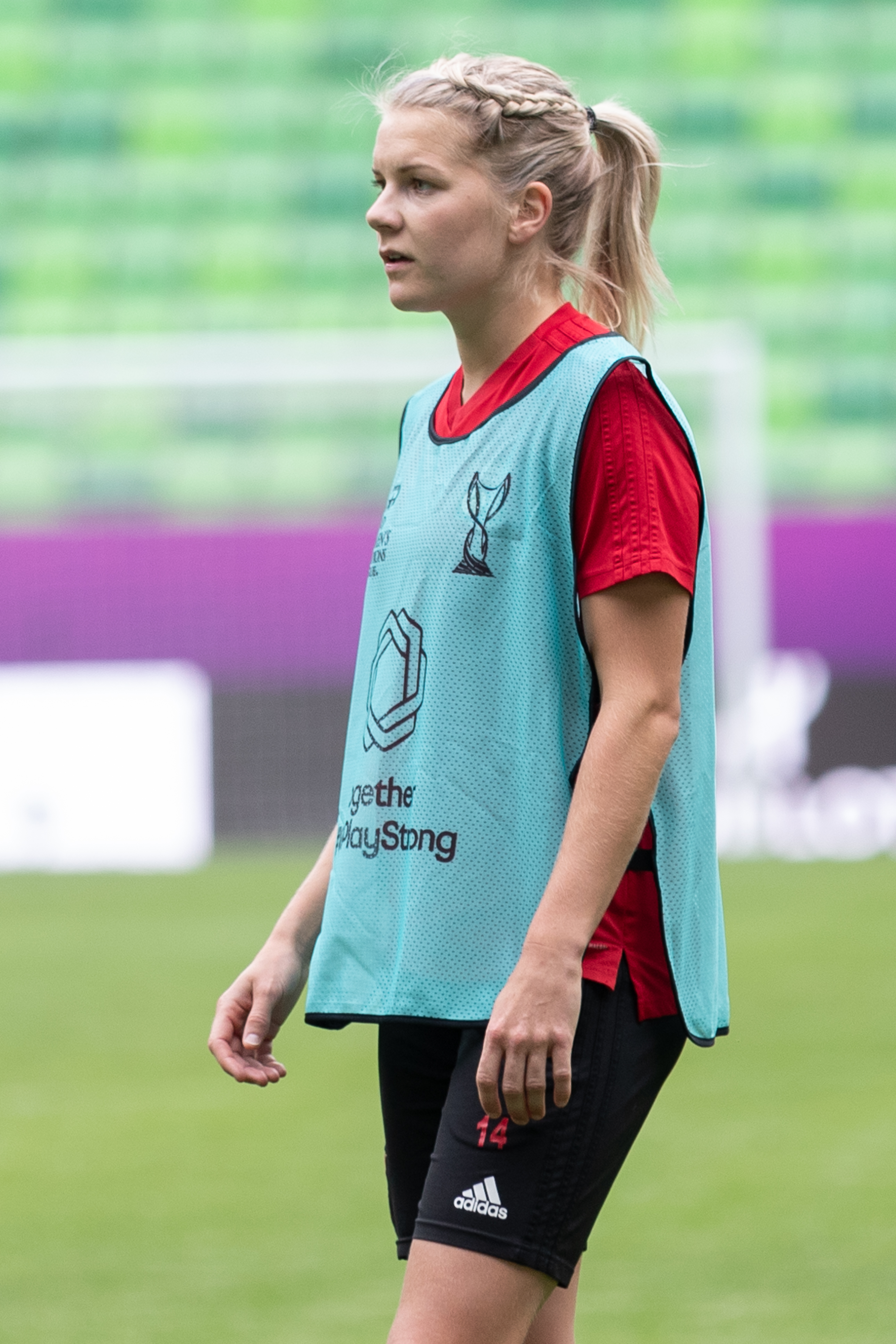
Hegerberg warming up for Lyon in the 2019 UEFA Champions League Final

On 18 May 2019, Hegerberg delivered a Player of the Match performance in the 2019 UEFA Women's Champions League Final. With a hat-trick in just 16 minutes, she became the first player to score three goals in a UWCL final. Lyon completed the treble against Barcelona with a 4–1 victory, winning a fourth UWCL trophy in a row, a unique performance in modern football. By the end of the season, Hegerberg had won 13 out of 15 trophies possible in her stay with Lyon.

Injury

On 30 October 2019, she became the UEFA Women's Champions League all-time top scorer, after scoring her 53rd goal in her 50th appearance.

Hegerberg sustained an injury before Lyon were due to play Stade de Reims on 26 January 2020. It was later confirmed via an MRI scan that she had ruptured her anterior cruciate ligament. On 28 January, the club announced that she would miss at least the remainder of the season. In the wake of the COVID-19 breakthrough, the season was stopped only a few weeks after.

On 18 December 2020, she signed a contract extension with Lyon keeping her at the club through June 2024. It was said in a later press release from the club that Hegerberg would not be available before the start of the 2021–22 season.

Comeback

On 5 October 2021, Hegerberg made her Lyon comeback after 21 months on the sideline, playing the final 12 minutes in Lyon's 3–0 win over BK Häcken in the opening match of the UEFA Champions League group stage. She scored her first goals post-injury on 14 November 2021, with a brace against arch-rival Paris Saint-Germain, in one of the biggest games in women's football.

In April 2022, she was instrumental in the qualification of her team to the final of the Champions League, being credited with an assist in a 3–2 victory at home against Paris Saint-Germain, and scoring the opening goal in a 2–1 win away, in a national record 43,000 fans at the Parc des Princes. In the final, she scored a goal and had an assist in a 3–1 win over Barcelona, to win her sixth title in the competition.

On 17 April 2024, Hegerberg extended her contract with Lyon until the summer of 2027.

== International career ==
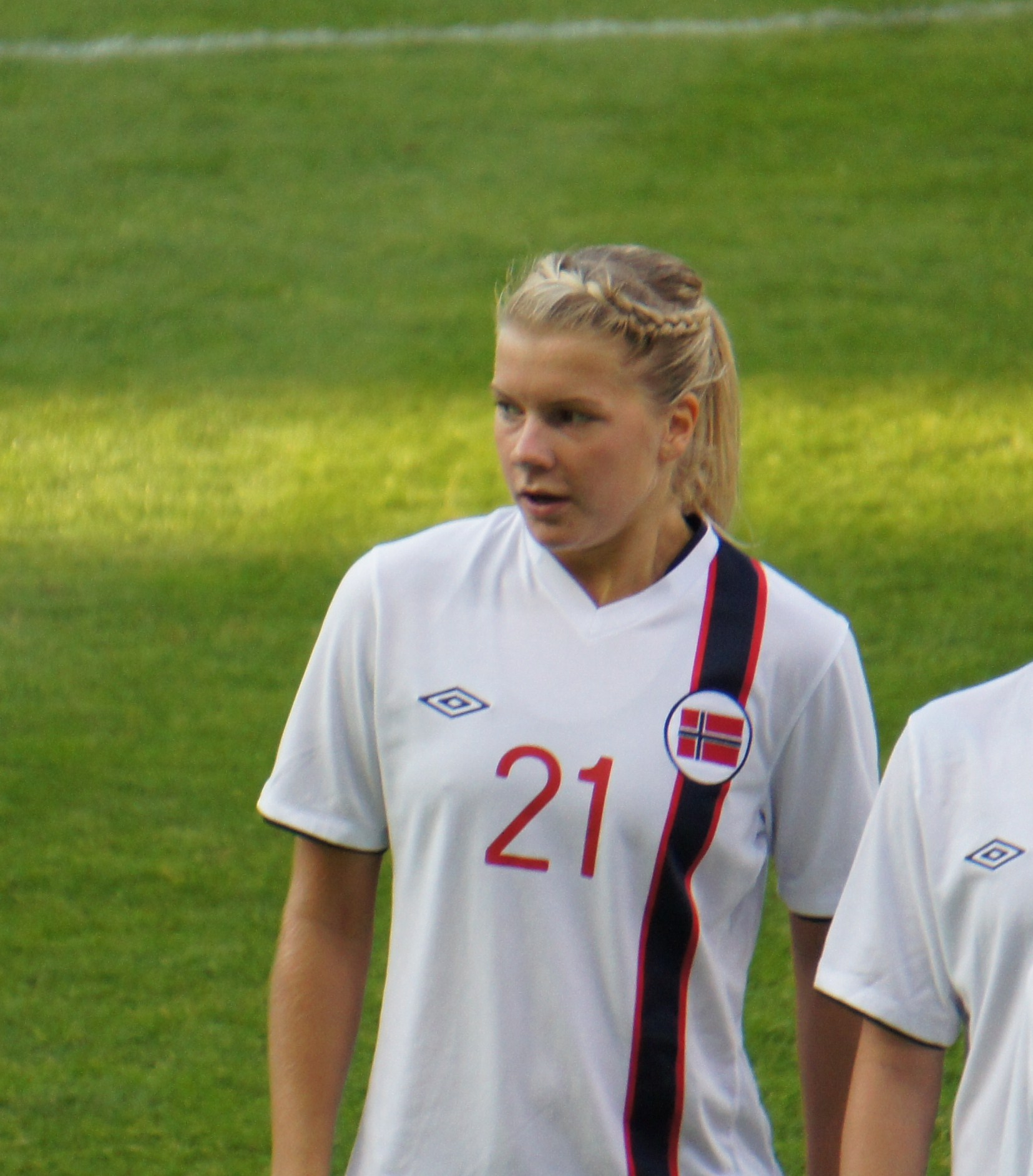
Ada Hegerberg playing for Norway in 2013

=== Youth ===
At the age of 15, Hegerberg was on team Norway under-19 that played at the 2011 UEFA U-19 Championship. She was also included in the squad for the final tournament, where Norway reached the final. Hegerberg was a member of the Norwegian team that reached the quarter-finals at the 2012 FIFA U-20 World Cup. She and Andrine scored the goals in a 2–1 win over Canada in the group stage.

=== Senior ===
She made her senior debut for Norway as a substitute in a 3–1 defeat to Northern Ireland in Lurgan on 19 November 2011.

Hegerberg made her championship debut on team Norway that played at the 2013 UEFA European Championship; a 1–1 draw with Iceland on 11 July 2013. She scored her first goal in the tournament as Spain were defeated 3–1 in the quarter-final and played the entire 90 minutes as Norway lost the final 1–0 to Germany.

Hegerberg was on team Norway at the 2015 World Cup. She scored three goals in three group stage games, highlighted by a two-goal performance in Norway 3–1 over Ivory Coast. Hegerberg was nominated for the Best Young Player Award for her efforts.

In January 2016, Hegerberg was awarded the 2015 Norwegian Gold Ball, given to the best footballer in Norway. The previous time it was awarded to a woman was 20 years earlier.

Protest

In the summer of 2017, Hegerberg decided to stop representing the national team as a form of protest due to a dispute with the NFF about how they treat women's football. Despite some improvements including the doubling of the remuneration pot for women, Hegerberg felt there was "still a long way to go" so has continued to refuse to be called up and missed the 2019 World Cup. She described her time with the national team "deeply depressing", giving her "nightmares", and leaving her "mentally broken".

Return

In March 2022, Hegerberg ended her five year exile from the national team. On her first game back on 7 April, Hegerberg scored a hat-trick in a 5–1 win against Kosovo in the 2023 World Cup qualification. A large influence in Hegerberg's decision to return to national play was the appointment of new NFF president Lise Klaveness, with whom Hegerberg spoke in depth about the vision of women's football moving forward.

On 19 June 2023, she was included in the 23-player Norwegian squad for the World Cup 2023. In the match against Switzerland she was in the starting lineup, but suffered a groin injury during warm-up sprints, and exited the field before the match began. She returned two games later, coming on as a 74th minute substitute for Caroline Graham Hansen in the Round of 16 against Japan, but the game was lost 3–1.

On 16 June 2025, Hegerberg was called up to the Norway squad for the UEFA Euro 2025.

== Personal life ==
In June 2019, Hegerberg married Thomas Rogne.

=== Sponsors and media ===
Hegerberg is one of the most in-demand athletes in the world. After being awarded the Ballon d'Or in 2018, she became an ambassador for the watchmaker Hublot, as well as the financial technology company Mastercard. During the summer of 2019, after attending events such as the UEFA Champions League Final and the French Open for her sponsor Mastercard, she became the global ambassador of the Danone Nations Cup, the biggest international tournament of U12, for both girls and boys. In the summer of 2020, after six years collaborating with sports equipment supplier Puma, Nike and herself announced a long-term partnership. The American giant immediately elevated Hegerberg in multiple marketing campaigns, reinforcing its will to support activism, Hegerberg being known as a gender equality and sustainability activist.

Hegerberg has had a massive media impact over the past years, widely considered as the number one spokesperson for her sport, given the numerous interviews she gave for women's football.

On 19 November 2020, the US-based streaming platform ESPN+ published a documentary about Hegerberg: My Name is Ada Hegerberg.

Hegerberg has been named one of the most powerful women in sport by a number of media, including Sports Illustrated.

== Career statistics ==
=== Club ===
As of match played 18 September 2026

Appearances and goals by club, season and competition
Club	Season	Division	League		National cup (Note: Includes Norwegian Cup, DFB-Pokal and Coupe de France)		Continental (Note: Appearances in UEFA Women's Champions League)		Total	
Club	Season	Division	Apps	Goals	Apps	Goals	Apps	Goals	Apps	Goals
Kolbotn	2010	Toppserien	9	3	0	0	—		9	3
Kolbotn	2011	Toppserien	21	12	2	0	—		23	12
Stabæk	2012	Toppserien	18	25	5	7	3	2	26	34
Total			48	40	7	7	3	2	58	49
Turbine Potsdam	2012–13	Bundesliga	11	5	2	0	0	0	13	5
Turbine Potsdam	2013–14	Bundesliga	14	6	1	1	5	2	20	9
Turbine Potsdam	Total		25	11	3	1	5	2	33	14
Lyon	2014–15	Division 1 Féminine	22	26	6	7	4	1	32	34
Lyon	2015–16	Division 1 Féminine	21	33	5	8	9	13	35	54
Lyon	2016–17	Division 1 Féminine	22	20	3	3	8	4	33	27
Lyon	2017–18	Division 1 Féminine	20	31	4	7	9	15	33	53
Lyon	2018–19	Division 1 Féminine	20	20	4	2	9	7	33	29
Lyon	2019–20	Division 1 Féminine	13	14	1	0	4	9	18	23
Lyon	2020–21	Division 1 Féminine	0	0	0	0	0	0	0	0
Lyon	2021–22	Division 1 Féminine	16	10	2	1	10	6	28	17
Lyon	2022–23	Division 1 Féminine	5	4	2	2	1	0	8	6
Lyon	2023–24	Division 1 Féminine	15	12	4	4	7	5	26	21
Lyon	2024–25	Première Ligue	15	5	1	0	7	2	23	7
Lyon	2025–26	Première Ligue	17	7	7	5	11	3	35	15
Lyon	2026–27	Première Ligue	9	10	0	0	4	0	13	10
Lyon	Total		195	192	39	39	83	65	317	296
Career total			268	244	49	47	91	69	408	359

=== International ===
As of match played 9 October 2026

Appearances and goals by national team and year
National team	Year	Apps	Goals
Norway
Norway	2011	1	0
Norway	2012	1	0
Norway	2013	13	5
Norway	2014	11	7
Norway	2015	16	11
Norway	2016	13	12
Norway	2017	11	3
Norway	—N/a (Note: Hegerberg wasn't part of the national team from July 2017 to April 2022 due to a dispute with the Norwegian Football Federation.)		
Norway	2022	8	4
Norway	2023	6	4
Norway	2024	6	3
Norway	2025	10	3
Norway	2026	5	3
Total		101	55

Scores and results list Norway's goal tally first, score column indicates score after each Hegerberg goal.

List of international goals scored by Ada Hegerberg
No.	Date	Venue	Opponent	Score	Result	Competition
1	6 March 2013	Estádio Municipal Bela Vista, Parchal, Portugal	Japan	2–0	2–0	2013 Algarve Cup
2	13 March 2013	Municipal Stadium, Lagos, Portugal	Sweden	2–2	2–2	2013 Algarve Cup
3	6 April 2013	Colovray Sports Centre, Nyon, Switzerland	Switzerland	1–2	1–3	Friendly
4	1 June 2013	Linköping Arena, Linköping, Sweden	Sweden	1–0	1–2	Friendly
5	22 July 2013	Guldfågeln Arena, Kalmar, Sweden	Spain	3–0	3–1	UEFA Women's Euro 2013
6	14 January 2014	La Manga Club Football Stadium, La Manga, Spain	Spain	2–1	2–1	Friendly
7	13 February 2014	Komotini Municipal Stadium, Komotini, Greece	Greece	3–0	5–0	2015 FIFA Women's World Cup qualification
8	10 April 2014	Den Dreef, Leuven, Belgium	Belgium	2–0	2–1	2015 FIFA Women's World Cup qualification
9	14 June 2014	Brann Stadion, Bergen, Norway	Greece	1–0	6–0	2015 FIFA Women's World Cup qualification
10	13 September 2014	Niko Dovana Stadium, Durrës, Albania	Albania	5–0	11–0	2015 FIFA Women's World Cup qualification
11	13 September 2014	Niko Dovana Stadium, Durrës, Albania	Albania	6–0	11–0	2015 FIFA Women's World Cup qualification
12	27 November 2014	Randaberg Stadion, Randaberg, Norway	New Zealand	2–0	2–0	Friendly
13	15 January 2015	La Manga Club Football Stadium, La Manga, Spain	Republic of Ireland	1–0	3–1	Friendly
14	15 January 2015	La Manga Club Football Stadium, La Manga, Spain	Republic of Ireland	2–1	3–1	Friendly
15	4 March 2015	VRSA Sports Complex, Vila Real de Santo António, Portugal	United States	1–0	1–2	2015 Algarve Cup
16	23 May 2015	Stayen, Sint-Truiden, Belgium	Belgium	2–2	2–3	Friendly
17	7 June 2015	TD Place Stadium, Ottawa, Canada	Thailand	4–0	4–0	2015 FIFA Women's World Cup
18	15 June 2015	Croix-Bleue Medavie Stadium, Moncton, Canada	Ivory Coast	1–0	3–1	2015 FIFA Women's World Cup
19	15 June 2015	Croix-Bleue Medavie Stadium, Moncton, Canada	Ivory Coast	2–0	3–1	2015 FIFA Women's World Cup
20	17 September 2015	Firhill Stadium, Glasgow, Scotland	Scotland	2–0	4–0	Friendly
21	22 September 2015	Kazhymukan Munaitpasov Stadium, Nur-Sultan, Kazakhstan	Kazakhstan	1–0	4–0	2017 UEFA Women's Euro qualification
22	22 September 2015	Kazhymukan Munaitpasov Stadium, Nur-Sultan, Kazakhstan	Kazakhstan	2–0	4–0	2017 UEFA Women's Euro qualification
23	23 October 2015	Color Line Stadion, Ålesund, Norway	Wales	2–0	4–0	2017 UEFA Women's Euro qualification
24	22 January 2016	La Manga Club Football Stadium, La Manga, Spain	Romania	4–0	6–0	Friendly
25	22 January 2016	La Manga Club Football Stadium, La Manga, Spain	Romania	5–0	6–0	Friendly
26	5 March 2016	Sparta Stadion Het Kasteel, Rotterdam, Netherlands	Netherlands	3–1	4–1	2016 UEFA Women's Olympic Qualifying Tournament
27	5 March 2016	Sparta Stadion Het Kasteel, Rotterdam, Netherlands	Netherlands	4–1	4–1	2016 UEFA Women's Olympic Qualifying Tournament
28	6 April 2016	Ramat Gan Stadium, Ramat Gan, Israel	Israel	1–0	1–0	2017 UEFA Women's Euro qualification
29	7 June 2016	Newport Stadium, Newport, Wales	Wales	1–0	2–0	2017 UEFA Women's Euro qualification
30	7 June 2016	Newport Stadium, Newport, Wales	Wales	2–0	2–0	2017 UEFA Women's Euro qualification
31	15 September 2016	Aker Stadion, Molde, Norway	Kazakhstan	1–0	10–0	2017 UEFA Women's Euro qualification
32	19 September 2016	Høddvoll Stadion, Ulsteinvik, Norway	Israel	1–0	5–0	2017 UEFA Women's Euro qualification
33	19 September 2016	Høddvoll Stadion, Ulsteinvik, Norway	Israel	2–0	5–0	2017 UEFA Women's Euro qualification
34	19 September 2016	Høddvoll Stadion, Ulsteinvik, Norway	Israel	3–0	5–0	2017 UEFA Women's Euro qualification
35	29 November 2016	Stadion an der Gellertstraße, Chemnitz, Germany	Germany	1–0	1–1	Friendly
36	22 January 2017	La Manga Club Football Stadium, La Manga, Spain	England	1–0	1–0	Friendly
37	1 March 2017	Estádio Municipal Bela Vista, Parchal, Portugal	Iceland	1–0	1–1	2017 Algarve Cup
38	10 April 2017	Skagerak Arena, Skien, Norway	Switzerland	1–0	2–1	Friendly
39	7 April 2022	Sandefjord Arena, Sandefjord, Norway	Kosovo	1–0	5–1	2023 FIFA Women's World Cup qualification
40	7 April 2022	Sandefjord Arena, Sandefjord, Norway	Kosovo	2–0	5–1	2023 FIFA Women's World Cup qualification
41	7 April 2022	Sandefjord Arena, Sandefjord, Norway	Kosovo	4–1	5–1	2023 FIFA Women's World Cup qualification
42	25 June 2022	Ullevaal Stadion, Oslo, Norway	New Zealand	1–0	2–0	Friendly
43	6 April 2023	Estadi Municipal de Can Misses, Ibiza, Spain	Spain	1–1	2–4	Friendly
44	1 December 2023	Ullevaal Stadion, Oslo, Norway	Portugal	1–0	4–0	2023–24 UEFA Women's Nations League
45	1 December 2023	Ullevaal Stadion, Oslo, Norway	Portugal	2–0	4–0	2023–24 UEFA Women's Nations League
46	1 December 2023	Ullevaal Stadion, Oslo, Norway	Portugal	3–0	4–0	2023–24 UEFA Women's Nations League
47	23 February 2024	Opus Arena, Osijek, Croatia	Croatia	1–0	3–0	2023–24 UEFA Women's Nations League play-offs
48	25 October 2024	Loro Boriçi Stadium, Shkodër, Albania	Albania	4–0	5–0	UEFA Women's Euro 2025 qualifying play-offs
49	29 October 2024	Ullevaal Stadion, Oslo, Norway	Albania	3–0	9–0	UEFA Women's Euro 2025 qualifying play-offs
50	2 July 2025	St. Jakob-Park, Basel, Switzerland	Switzerland	1–1	2–1	UEFA Women's Euro 2025
51	16 July 2025	Stade de Genève, Geneva, Switzerland	Italy	1–1	1–2	UEFA Women's Euro 2025
52	28 November 2025	Estadio Municipal de La Línea, La Línea, Spain	Brazil	3–1	3–1	Friendly
53	14 April 2026	Åråsen Stadion, Lillestrøm, Norway	Slovenia	1–0	5–0	2027 FIFA Women's World Cup qualification
54	14 April 2026	Åråsen Stadion, Lillestrøm, Norway	Slovenia	5–0	5–0	2027 FIFA Women's World Cup qualification
55	18 April 2026	Ptuj City Stadium, Ptuj, Slovenia	Slovenia	1–0	3–2	2027 FIFA Women's World Cup qualification

== Honours ==
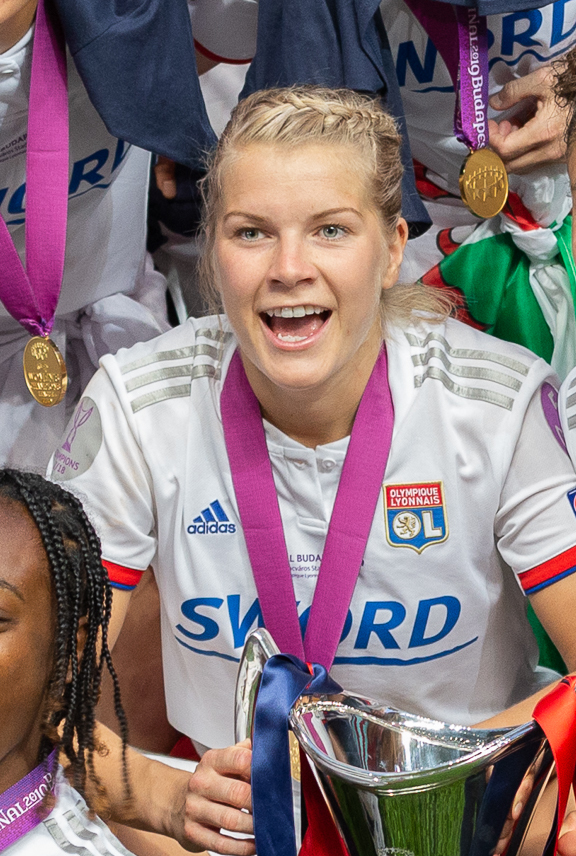
Ada Hegerberg with Lyon in 2019

Stabæk

- Norwegian Women's Cup: 2012

Lyon

- Première Ligue: 2014–15, 2015–16, 2016–17, 2017–18, 2018–19, 2019–20, 2021–22, 2022–23, 2023–24, 2024–25
- Coupe de France Féminine: 2014–15, 2015–16, 2016–17, 2018–19, 2019–20, 2022–23, 2025–26
- Coupe LFFP: 2025–26
- Trophée des Championnes: 2019, 2022, 2023
- UEFA Women's Champions League: 2015–16, 2016–17, 2017–18, 2018–19, 2019–20, 2021–22

Norway

- UEFA Women's Euro: runner-up 2013

Individual

- UEFA Best Women's Player in Europe: 2016
- UEFA Best Women's Player in Europe: runner-up 2018, 2019
- Norwegian Sportsperson of the Year: 2016
- FIFA FIFPro World XI: 2016
- The 100 Best Female Footballers In The World Winner: 2016
- BBC Women's Footballer of the Year: 2017, 2019
- Ballon d'Or Féminin: 2018
- The Best FIFA Women's Player – Third Place: 2018
- The Best FIFA Women's Player – Nominated: 2019
- IFFHS Women's World Team: 2018, 2019
- Gullballen: 2015, 2016, 2018
- IFFHS World's Woman Team of the Decade 2011–2020
- IFFHS UEFA Woman Team of the Decade 2011–2020
- UEFA Women's Champions League Best Goalscorer: 2016, 2018
- Division 1 Féminine Best Goalscorer: 2016, 2017, 2018
- Division 1 Féminine Best Player: 2016
- 2019 UEFA Women's Champions League Final Player of the Match
- UEFA Women's Champions League Squad of the Season: 2015–16, 2017–18, 2018–19, 2021–22

Records

- Most goals in the UEFA Women's Champions League: 59
- Most goals in a UEFA Women's Champions League season: 15
- Most goals in the UEFA Women's Champions League for a club: 55 (Olympique Lyonnais)
- First footballer to score a hat-trick in a UEFA Women's Champions League final (single match)
- First footballer to score in 4 different UEFA Women's Champions League finals (second to Alfredo di Stefano both men and women combined)
- Quickest footballer to reach 50 goals both UEFA Women's Champions and UEFA Champions League combined (49 games)

== See also ==
- List of women's footballers with 100 or more international caps

== Notes ==
Awards
Preceded by Petter Northug	Norwegian Sportsperson of the Year; 2016	Succeeded by Karsten Warholm
