= Jana Adámková =

Czech football referee

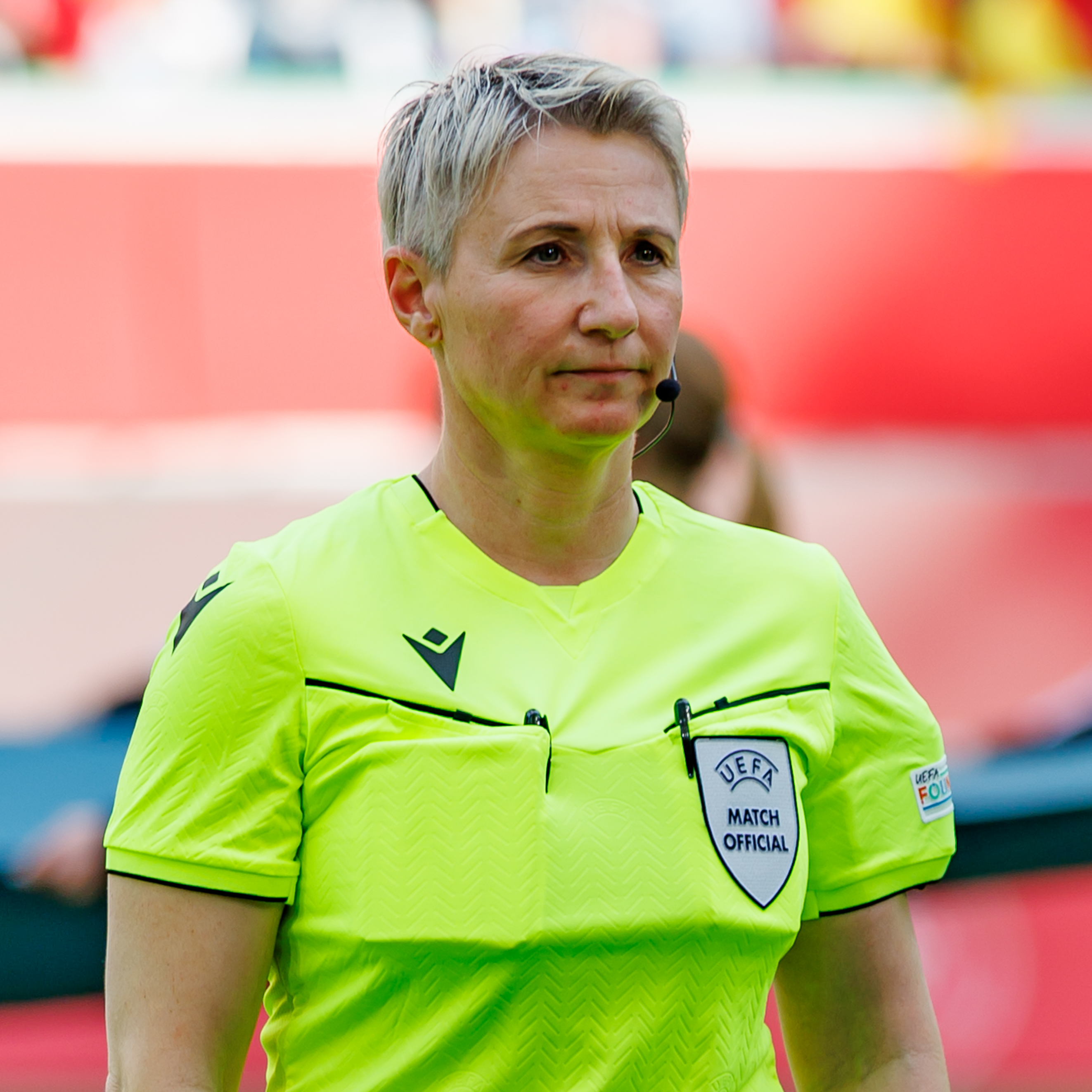
- Full name: Jana Adámková
- Born: 27 January 1978 (age 48); Brno, Czechoslovakia (now the Czech Republic)

Domestic
Years	League	Role
2018–	Czech First League	Referee

International
Years	League	Role

Jana Adámková (born 27 January 1978) is a football referee from the Czech Republic.

In the Czech Domestic league system, Adámková has refereed in the Czech First League.

At confederation level she has officiated at the UEFA Women's Champions League, UEFA Women's Euro.

Adámková was appointed to be an official at the 2019 FIFA Women's World Cup in France.
