= Matilde Fidalgo =

Portuguese footballer

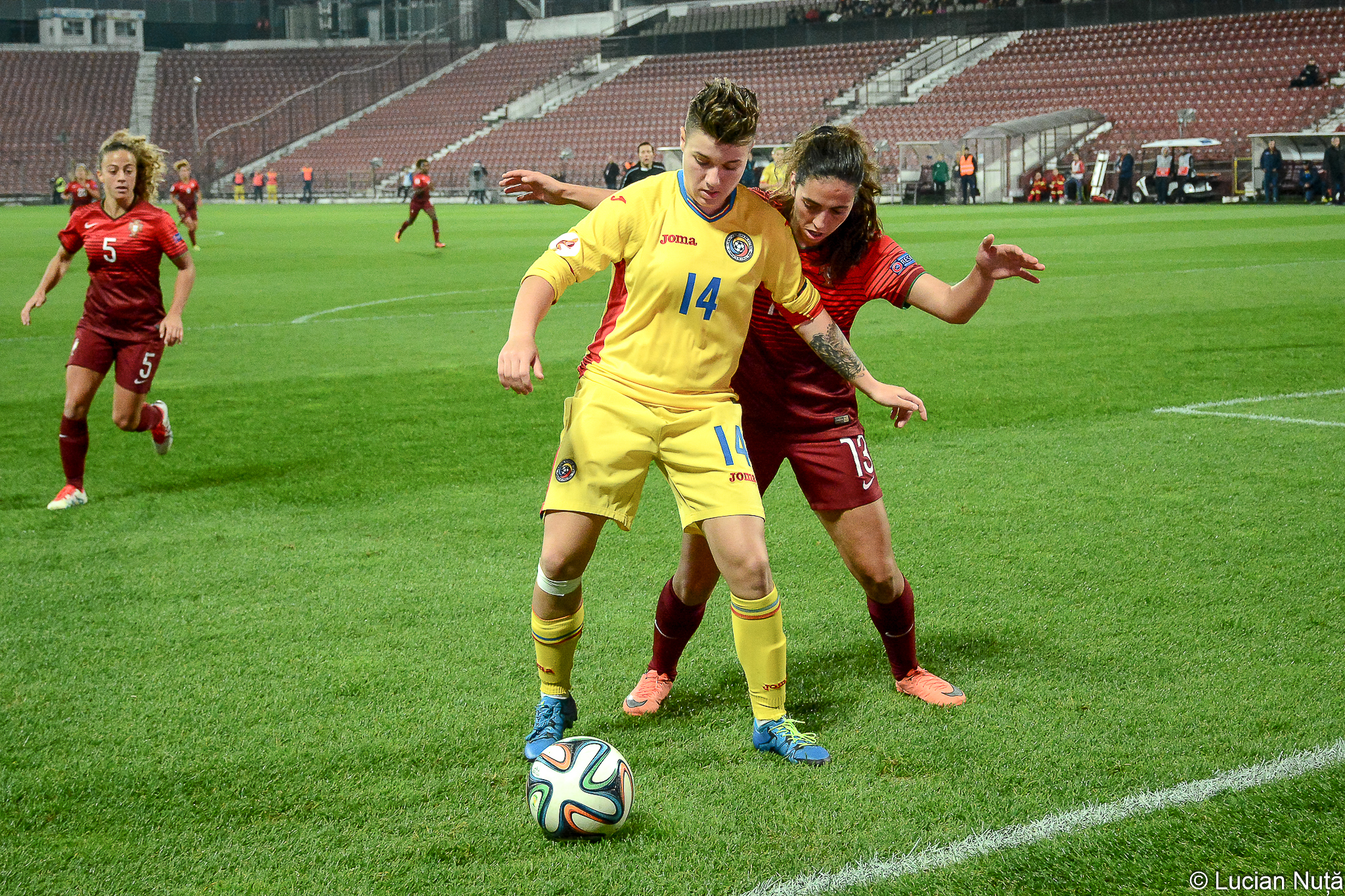
- Fidalgo (in red jersey)

Personal information
- Full name: Matilde Mota Veiga Santiago Fidalgo
- Date of birth: 15 May 1994 (age 32)
- Place of birth: São Domingos de Benfica, Portugal
- Height: 1.59 m (5 ft 3 in)
- Position: Defender

Senior career*
Years	Team	Apps	(Gls)
2009–2017	CF Benfica	55	(5)
2017–2018	Sporting CP	17	(1)
2018–2019	SC Braga	16	(0)
2018	SC Braga B	1	(0)
2019–2020	Manchester City	2	(0)
2020–2021	Benfica	23	(1)
2021–2023	Betis	19	(0)
2023–2024	Famalicão	16	(0)

International career
2011–2013	Portugal U19	24	(0)
2013–?	Portugal	48	(0)
- * Club domestic league appearances and goals

Matilde Mota Veiga Santiago Fidalgo (born 15 May 1994) is a Portuguese professional former footballer who played as a right-back or a centre-back. She earned 48 caps for the Portugal national team, having made her senior debut for Portugal in September 2013, and represented her country at UEFA Women's Euro 2017.

== Club career ==
Fidalgo was born in São Domingos de Benfica, Lisbon and from a young age has played football. In 2009, Fidalgo started her career at CF Benfica in the Portuguese League. She played for the Lisbon club until June 2017 when she moved to Sporting CP. With CF Benfica, Fidalgo won two national titles in the 2014–15, 2015–16 seasons and was elected "Best Player" for the 2015/2016 season by the "Sindicato dos Jogadores Profissionais de Futebol (SJPF)". She also captained the team for several seasons. In March 2018, Fidalgo won the "Quinas de Ouro" award as one of the "11 Best Players in the Women's League". The award is given by the Portuguese Football Federation. In 2018 she moved to the rival team SC Braga, with whom she won the Portuguese League title – Braga's first championship win. On 30 May 2019, it was announced that Fidalgo was signed to Women's Super League team Manchester City. Fidalgo moved to S.L Benfica on 4 August 2020, after only making two league appearances and becoming third-choice behind Janine Beckie and even Georgia Stanway, who was not a natural right-back.

== International career ==
On 22 February 2011, Fidalgo debuted for Portugal U19 in a win against Finland U19 for the 2011 UEFA Women's Under-19 Championship Qualifying Round. She also represented Portugal at the qualifying stages of the 2012 UEFA Women's Under-19 Championship and the 2013 UEFA Women's Under-19 Championship. On 26 September 2013, Fidalgo debuted for the Portuguese Senior Team in a win against Greece, a 2015 FIFA Women's World Cup qualification's match. Since then, she represented Portugal in several international competitions including the qualifying stages for the UEFA Women's Euro 2017 and the 2019 FIFA Women's World Cup. On 6 July 2017, Fidalgo was called by coach Francisco Neto to represent Portugal at the UEFA Women's Euro 2017, the first time the Portuguese team reached the final stage of a big international tournament. She didn't play in any matches as her team was eliminated while still in the Group Stage.

== Personal life ==
Fidalgo is a cousin of Bernardo Silva. Both were born in 1994, share the same great-grandparents, play internationally for the Portugal national team and once both played their club football at Manchester City.

== Honours ==
CF Benfica

- Campeonato Nacional Feminino: 2014–15, 2015–16
- Campeonato Nacional II Divisão: 2009–10
- Taça de Portugal Feminina: 2014–15, 2015–16
- Supertaça de Portugal Feminina: 2015

Sporting CP

- Campeonato Nacional Feminino: 2017–18
- Taça de Portugal Feminina: 2017–18
- Supertaça de Portugal Feminina: 2017

SC Braga

- Campeonato Nacional Feminino: 2018–19

Manchester City

- Women's FA Cup: 2019–20

Benfica

- Campeonato Nacional Feminino: 2020–21, 2021–22
- Taça da Liga: 2019–20, 2020–21
