= Kika Nazareth =

Portuguese footballer (born 2002)

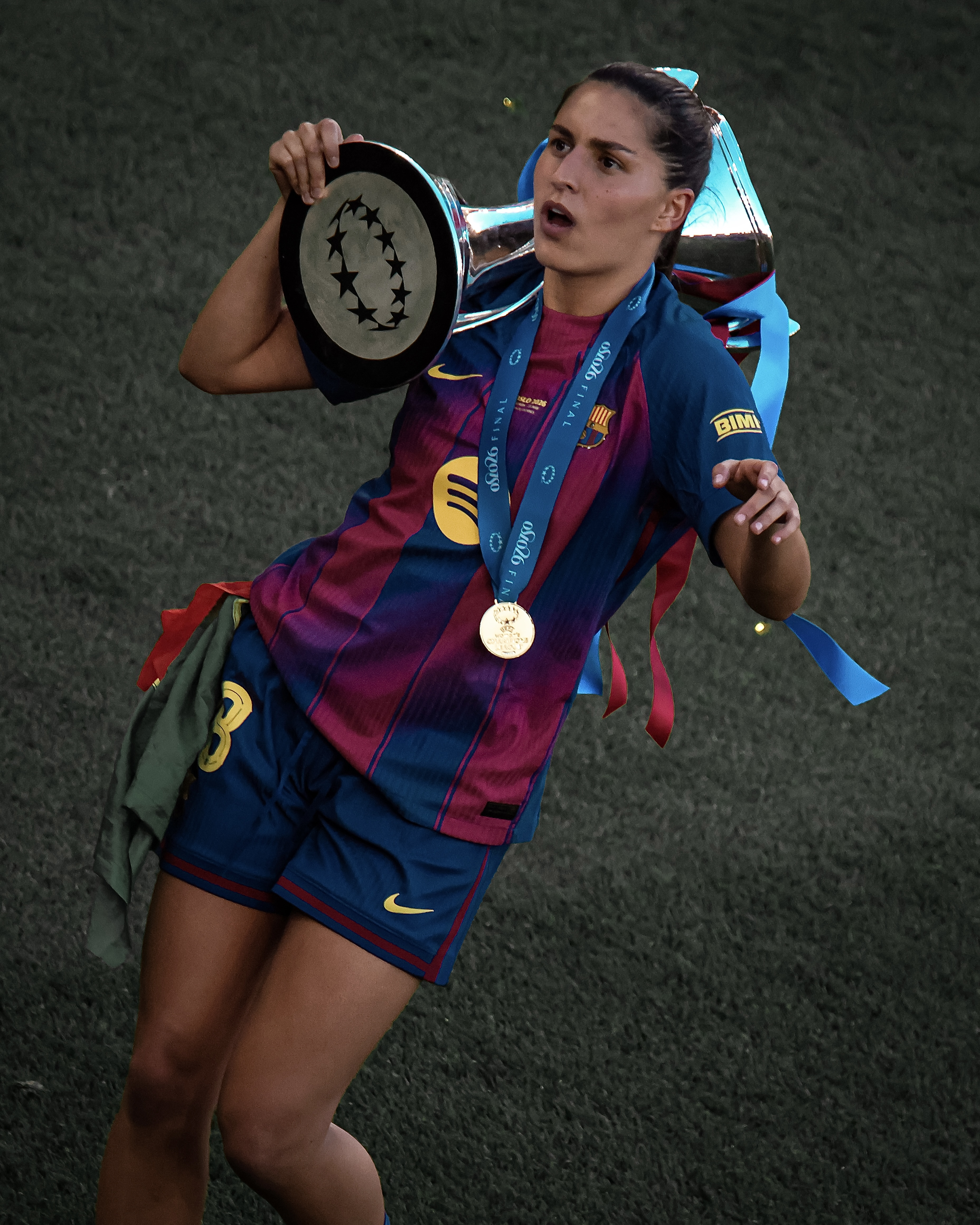
- Nazareth in 2026

Personal information
- Full name: Francisca Ramos Ribeiro Nazareth Sousa
- Date of birth: 17 November 2002 (age 23)
- Place of birth: Lisbon, Portugal
- Height: 1.70 m (5 ft 7 in)
- Positions: Forward; midfielder

Team information
- Current team: Barcelona
- Number: 18

Youth career
- 2016–2017: CF Benfica
- 2017–2018: Casa Pia A.C.
- 2018–2020: Benfica

Senior career*
Years	Team	Apps	(Gls)
2018–2024	Benfica	68	(57)
2024–	Barcelona	38	(12)

International career^{‡}
2018–2019	Portugal U17	13	(5)
2019–2020	Portugal U19	7	(6)
2020–	Portugal	52	(13)
- * Club domestic league appearances and goals as of 27 March 2026 ‡ National team caps and goals as of 18 April 2026

Francisca Ramos Ribeiro Nazareth Sousa (born 17 November 2002), commonly known as Kika or Kika Nazareth, is a Portuguese footballer who plays for Liga F club Barcelona and the Portugal national team.

== Club career ==
=== Benfica ===
Nazareth made her senior debut for Benfica at the age of 16 and signed her first professional contract with the club on 7 October 2020, at the age of 17.

On the 2023–24 season, Nazareth was part of the historic Benfica team that won all four domestic competitions: the Supertaça de Portugal, the Taça da Liga, the Campeonato Nacional, and the Taça de Portugal.

Nazareth was forced to miss two months of play after sustaining an injury in early January 2024. She returned in March and quickly took back her spot in the starting lineup.

=== Barcelona ===
On 4 July 2024, Nazareth completed a move to Liga F side FC Barcelona for €500,000, a record fee for the women's football in Portugal. She made her official debut in a 3–0 win against Deportivo de La Coruña in early September, and scored her first league goal for the club in a 4–1 win over Levante in late October.

Nazareth secured her first piece of silverware with Barcelona on 26 January 2025, when the culers defeated rivals Real Madrid 5–0 to claim the Spanish Supercup.

On the second leg of the Copa de la Reina semi-final against Real Madrid, Nazareth suffered a serious ankle injury, forcing her to be substituted off at half-time. This injury would force the end of her club football season, and brought her participation in the 2025 Euro into question. From the sidelines, Nazareth saw Barcelona win a record sixth consecutive Liga F title and second consecutive Copa de la Reina. Barcelona could not secure a Champions League victory, losing 1-0 against Arsenal in the final, held in Nazareth's hometown of Lisbon. She was able to help Barcelona win the 2024-25 Copa Catalunya Femenina, given the large interval of over six months between the semi-finals and final.

In the 2025–26 season, Nazareth helped Barcelona win another quadruple (the club's fourth overall and second to include the Champion's League). The team won every competition they entered that season, further cementing their chokehold both nationally and continentally. With Barcelona's Champions League victory, Nazareth became only the second Portuguese player to win the women's competition, following the footsteps of former teammate Jéssica Silva.

== International career ==
Nazareth made her debut for the Portugal national team on 4 March 2020, coming on as a substitute for Carolina Mendes in the 2020 Algarve Cup. She scored her first and second goals for the Portugal national team on 22 June 2022 in a 4–0 friendly win against Greece. On 30 May 2023, she was included in the 23-player squad for the 2023 World Cup. During the tournament, she became the youngest-ever player to score for Portugal in a World Cup, breaking a record previously set in 2006 by Cristiano Ronaldo.

On 24 June 2025, Nazareth was called up to the Portugal squad for the 2025 Euro. She had not played since March, having suffered an ankle injury requiring surgery. At the tournament, Nazareth played two group-stage matches, but did not manage to contribute with any goals or assists. The Portuguese team were eliminated in the group stage after collecting only one point in three matches, suffering losses to both Spain and Belgium, and drawing against Italy.

== Career statistics ==
=== Club ===
As of match played 21 March 2026

Appearances and goals by club, season and competition
Club	Season	League			National cup (Note: Includes Taça de Portugal and Copa de la Reina)		League cup (Note: Includes Taça da Liga)		Continental (Note: Includes UEFA Women's Champions League)		Other (Note: Includes Supertaça de Portugal, Supercopa de España and Copa Catalunya Femenina)		Total	
Club	Season	Division	Apps	Goals	Apps	Goals	Apps	Goals	Apps	Goals	Apps	Goals	Apps	Goals
Benfica	2018–19	II Divisão Feminino	1	0	0	0	0	0	—		—		1	0
Benfica	2019–20	Campeonato Nacional Feminino	2	3	1	0	2	0	—		—		5	3
Benfica	2020–21	Campeonato Nacional Feminino	15	12	1	0	4	1	3	0	—		24	13
Benfica	2021–22	Campeonato Nacional Feminino	13	10	2	0	4	1	10	3	1	0	30	14
Benfica	2022–23	Campeonato Nacional Feminino	17	15	5	6	4	3	8	1	1	1	36	26
Benfica	2023–24	Campeonato Nacional Feminino	18	17	2	1	1	0	9	5	2	2	31	25
Benfica	Total		66	57	11	7	15	5	30	9	4	3	126	81
Barcelona	2024–25	Liga F	19	3	3	0	0	0	6	3	3	0	29	6
Barcelona	2025–26	Liga F	19	9	2	1	0	0	5	1	1	0	13	5
Barcelona	Total		38	12	5	1	0	0	11	4	4	0	58	17
Career total			104	69	16	8	15	5	41	13	8	3	184	98

=== International ===
As of match played 18 April 2026

Appearances and goals by national team and year
National team	Year	Apps	Goals
Portugal	2020	1	0
Portugal	2021	10	0
Portugal	2022	12	6
Portugal	2023	12	1
Portugal	2024	7	2
Portugal	2025	6	1
Portugal	2026	4	3
Total		52	13

Scores and results list Portugal's goal tally first, score column indicates score after each Nazareth goal.

List of international goals scored by Kika Nazareth
No.	Date	Venue	Opponent	Score	Result	Competition
1	23 June 2022	Estadio do Restelo, Lisbon, Portugal	Greece	2–0	4–0	Friendly
2	23 June 2022	Estadio do Restelo, Lisbon, Portugal	Greece	4–0	4–0	Friendly
3	2 September 2022	Serbian FA Sports Center, Stara Pazova, Serbia	Serbia	2–1	2–1	2023 FIFA Women's World Cup qualification
4	6 September 2022	Estádio do FC Vizela, Vizela, Portugal	Turkey	2–0	4–0	2023 FIFA Women's World Cup qualification
5	11 October 2022	Estádio da Mata Real, Paços de Ferreira, Portugal	Iceland	4–1	4–1 (a.e.t.)	2023 FIFA Women's World Cup qualification – UEFA play-offs
6	11 November 2022	Estádio Municipal José Martins Vieira, Almada, Portugal	Haiti	5–0	5–0	Friendly
7	27 July 2023	Waikato Stadium, Hamilton, New Zealand	Vietnam	2–0	2–0	2023 FIFA Women's World Cup
8	4 June 2024	Mourneview Park, Lurgan, Northern Ireland	Northern Ireland	1–1	2–1	UEFA Women's Euro 2025 qualifying
9	29 November 2024	Estádio do Dragão, Porto, Portugal	Czech Republic	1–1	1–1	UEFA Women's Euro 2025 qualifying play-offs
10	21 February 2025	Estádio Municipal de Portimão, Portimão, Portugal	England	1–1	1–1	2025 UEFA Women's Nations League
11	14 April 2026	Daugava Stadium, Riga, Latvia	Latvia	1–0	3–0	2027 FIFA Women's World Cup qualification
12	14 April 2026	Daugava Stadium, Riga, Latvia	Latvia	3–0	3–0	2027 FIFA Women's World Cup qualification
13	18 April 2026	Futbal Tatran Arena, Prešov, Slovakia	Slovakia	2–1	2–1	2027 FIFA Women's World Cup qualification
14	5 June 2026	Estádio António Coimbra da Mota, Estoril, Portugal	Latvia	3–0	5–0	2027 FIFA Women's World Cup qualification
15	5 June 2026	Estádio António Coimbra da Mota, Estoril, Portugal	Latvia	4–0	5–0	2027 FIFA Women's World Cup qualification

== Honours ==
Benfica

- Campeonato Nacional Feminino: 2020–21, 2021–22, 2022–23, 2023–24
- Campeonato Nacional II Divisão Feminino: 2018–19
- Taça de Portugal: 2023–24
- Taça da Liga: 2019–20, 2020–21, 2022–23, 2023–24
- Supertaça de Portugal: 2022, 2023

Barcelona

- Primera División: 2024–25, 2025–26
- Copa de la Reina: 2024–25, 2025–26
- Supercopa de España Femenina: 2024–25, 2025–26
- Copa Catalunya Femenina: 2024–25
- UEFA Women's Champions League: 2025–26

Individual

- Cosme Damião Awards – Women's Revelation of the Year: 2022
- Cosme Damião Awards – Women's Footballer of the Year: 2023, 2024
- Campeonato Nacional Feminino Player of the Year: 2023–24
- Campeonato Nacional Feminino Player of the Month: September/October 2023
- Campeonato Nacional Feminino Golden Boot: 2023–24
- Mundo Deportivo Revelation Player award: 2024
