= Ana Capeta =

Portuguese footballer (born 1997)

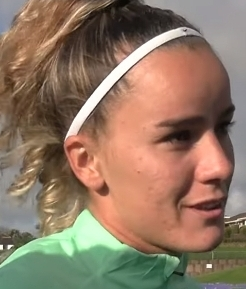
- Ana Capeta in 2023

Personal information
- Full name: Ana Inês Palma Capeta
- Date of birth: 22 December 1997 (age 28)
- Place of birth: Aljustrel, Beja, Portugal
- Height: 1.75 m (5 ft 9 in)
- Position: Forward

Team information
- Current team: Juventus
- Number: 7

Youth career
- 2005–2010: Operário Rio Moinhos (F7)
- 2010–2011: Aljustrelense (F7)
- 2011–2013: CB Castro Verde (F7)

Senior career*
Years	Team	Apps	(Gls)
2013–2015	Atlético Ouriense	1	(2)
2015–2016	CAC	0	(0)
2016–2021	Sporting CP	84	(66)
2021	PSV	0	(0)
2021–2022	Famalicão	14	(2)
2022–2026	Sporting CP	31	(24)
2026	→ Juventus (loan)	9	(2)
2026–	Juventus	0	(0)

International career^{‡}
2013	Portugal U16	2	(2)
2013–2016	Portugal U19	14	(3)
2018–	Portugal	58	(13)
- * Club domestic league appearances and goals as of 12 August 2026 ‡ National team caps and goals as of 12 August 2026

Ana Inês Palma Capeta (born 22 December 1997) is a Portuguese professional footballer who plays as a forward for Serie A club Juventus and the Portugal women's national team.

== Career ==
Capeta is a player from Sporting Clube de Portugal and has been capped for the Portugal national team, appearing for the team during the 2019 FIFA Women's World Cup qualifying cycle.

On 30 May 2023, she was included in the 23-player squad for the 2023 FIFA Women's World Cup.

On 24 June 2025, Capeta was called up to the Portugal squad for the UEFA Women's Euro 2025.

On 2 February 2026, Capeta joined Juventus on loan from Sporting CP until June 2026, with an option to buy.

On 11 May 2026, Juventus exercised the option that turn the loan into a permanent signing, with contract until 30 June 2028.

=== Club ===
As of match played 24 January 2026

Appearances and goals by club, season and competition
Club	Season	League			Cups		Continental		Total	
Club	Season	Division	Apps	Goals	Apps	Goals	Apps	Goals	Apps	Goals
Sporting CP	2017–18	Campeonato Nacional Feminino	15	10	1	3	0	0	16	13
Sporting CP	2018–19	Campeonato Nacional Feminino	20	25	0	0	3	1	23	28
Sporting CP	2019–20	Campeonato Nacional Feminino	11	5	0	0	0	0	11	5
Sporting CP	2020–21	1a Divisao - Sul	7	5	2	1	0	0	19	8
Sporting CP	2020–21	Campeão	10	2	2	1	0	0	19	8
Sporting CP	Total		63	47	3	4	0	0	66	51
FC Famalicão	2021–22	1a Divisao - Norte	3	1	8	8	0	0	22	9
FC Famalicão	2021–22	Campeão	11	1	8	8	0	0	22	9
FC Famalicão	Total		14	1	8	8	0	0	22	9
Sporting CP	2022–23	Campeonato Nacional Feminino	19	6	8	5	0	0	27	11
Sporting CP	2023–24	Campeonato Nacional Feminino	18	9	12	3	0	0	30	12
Sporting CP	2024–25	Campeonato Nacional Feminino	15	8	9	4	4	1	28	13
Sporting CP	2025–26	Campeonato Nacional Feminino	3	0	4	3	4	0	11	3
Sporting CP	Total		55	23	15	16	8	1	96	40
Juventus (loan)	2025–26	Serie A	0	0	0	0	0	0	0	0
Juventus (loan)	Total		0	0	0	0	0	0	0	0
Career total			132	71	26	28	8	1	166	100

=== Youth ===
As of match played 10 April 2016

Appearances and goals by national youth team and year
National team	Year	Apps	Goals
Portugal U19	2013	3	0
Portugal U19	2014	2	1
Portugal U19	2016	3	1
Total		7	0

=== Senior ===
As of match played 28 November 2025

Appearances and goals by national team and year
National team	Year	Apps	Goals
Portugal	2017	2	0
Portugal	2018	3	1
Portugal	2019	6	0
Portugal	2020	2	2
Portugal	2021	5	2
Portugal	2022	6	0
Portugal	2023	13	1
Portugal	2024	9	1
Portugal	2025	9	1
Total		55	8

== International goals ==
No.	Date	Venue	Opponent	Score	Result	Competition
1.	23 October 2020	AEK Arena – Georgios Karapatakis, Larnaca, Cyprus	Cyprus	3–0	3–0	UEFA Women's Euro 2022 qualifying
2.	1 December 2020	Estádio do Restelo, Lisbon, Portugal	Albania	1–0	1–0	UEFA Women's Euro 2022 qualifying
3.	23 February 2021	Antonis Papadopoulos Stadium, Larnaca, Cyprus	Scotland	1–0	2–0	UEFA Women's Euro 2022 qualifying
4.	17 February 2023	Waikato Stadium, Hamilton, New Zealand	New Zealand	3–0	5–0	Friendly
5.	17 February 2023	Waikato Stadium, Hamilton, New Zealand	New Zealand	4–0	5–0	Friendly
6.	7 April 2023	Estádio D. Afonso Henriques, Guimarães, Portugal	Japan	1–0	1–2	Friendly
7.	31 October 2023	Estádio do Varzim SC, Póvoa de Varzim, Portugal	Austria	1–1	1–2	2023–24 UEFA Women's Nations League
8.	21 February 2024	Estádio António Coimbra da Mota, Estoril, Portugal	Czech Republic	1–0	3–1	Friendly
9.	9 April 2024	Centenary Stadium, Ta' Qali, Malta	Malta	2–0	2–0	UEFA Women's Euro 2025 qualifying
10.	16 July 2024	Estádio Dr. Magalhães Pessoa, Leiria, Portugal	Malta	1–0	3–1	UEFA Women's Euro 2025 qualifying
11.	25 October 2024	Dalga Arena, Baku, Azerbaijan	Azerbaijan	1–0	4–1	UEFA Women's Euro 2025 qualifying play-offs
12.	7 March 2026	Estádio Cidade de Barcelos, Barcelos, Portugal	Slovakia	1–0	4–0	2027 FIFA Women's World Cup qualification
13.	7 March 2026	Estádio Cidade de Barcelos, Barcelos, Portugal	Slovakia	2–0	4–0	2027 FIFA Women's World Cup qualification
14.	5 June 2026	Estádio António Coimbra da Mota, Estoril, Portugal	Latvia	2–0	5–0	2027 FIFA Women's World Cup qualification

== Honours ==
Sporting CP

- Campeonato Nacional: 2016–17, 2017–18
- Taça de Portugal: 2016–17, 2017–18
- Supertaça de Portugal: 2017, 2024
