= Carole Costa =

Portuguese footballer (born 1990)

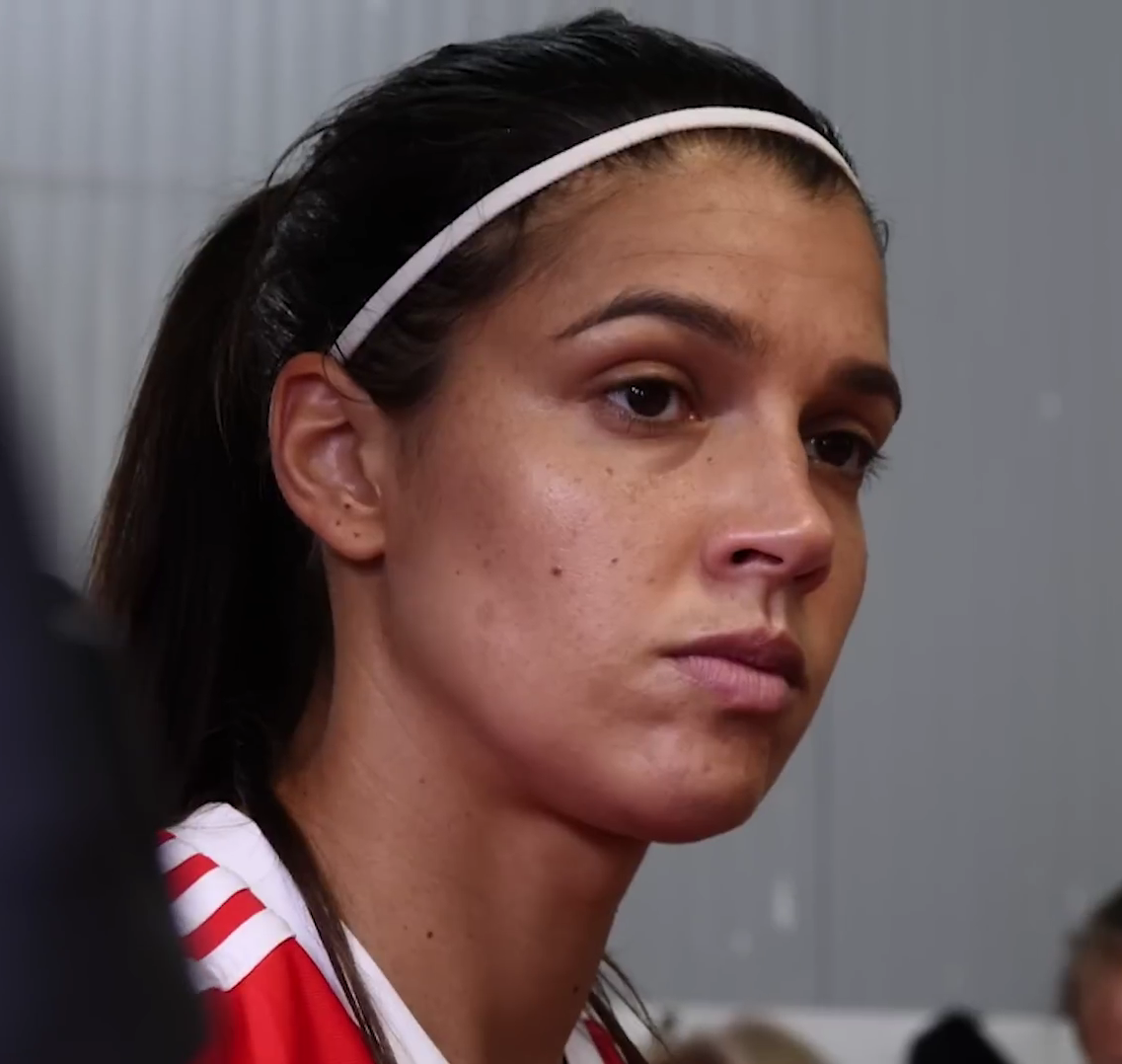
- Costa with Benfica in 2023

Personal information
- Full name: Carole da Silva Costa
- Date of birth: 3 May 1990 (age 36)
- Place of birth: Braga, Portugal
- Height: 1.73 m (5 ft 8 in)
- Position: Defender

Team information
- Current team: Galatasaray
- Number: 15

Youth career
- 2003–2009: Casa Povo Martim

Senior career*
Years	Team	Apps	(Gls)
2009–2010	Leixões	0	(0)
2010–2013	SGS Essen	42	(1)
2013–2015	MSV Duisburg	41	(1)
2015–2017	BV Cloppenburg	33	(6)
2017–2020	Sporting CP	52	(10)
2020–2026	Benfica	84	(19)
2026–	Galatasaray	0	(0)

International career^{‡}
2006–2009	Portugal U19	18	(0)
2010–	Portugal	192	(26)
- * Club domestic league appearances and goals as of 12 June 2025 ‡ National team caps and goals as of 13 October 2026

Carole da Silva Costa (born 3 May 1990) is a Portuguese footballer who plays as a centre-back for Galatasaray and the Portugal women's national football team.

== Club career ==
Born in northern Portugal, Carole Costa moved to Germany to play club football in August 2010. She joined Frauen-Bundesliga side SGS Essen, where she learned to speak German while playing football.

On July 13, 2026, she signed a contract with the Turkish giant Galatasaray.

== International career ==
On 30 May 2023, she was included in the 23-player squad for the FIFA Women's World Cup 2023.

On 24 June 2025, Costa was called up to the Portugal squad for the UEFA Women's Euro 2025.

== Honours ==
Benfica

- Campeonato Nacional Feminino: 2020–21, 2021–22, 2022–23, 2023–24, 2024–25
- Taça de Portugal Feminina: 2023–24
- Taça da Liga: 2019–20, 2020–21, 2022–23, 2023–24, 2024–25
- Supertaça de Portugal Feminina: 2022, 2023

Sporting

- Campeonato Nacional Feminino: 2017–18
- Taça de Portugal Feminina: 2017–18
- Supertaça de Portugal Feminina: 2017

== International goals ==
No.	Date	Venue	Opponent	Score	Result	Competition
1.	31 March 2010	Complexo Desportivo da Tocha, Tocha, Portugal	Armenia	5–0	7–0	2011 FIFA Women's World Cup qualification
2.	25 August 2010	Mika Stadium, Yerevan, Armenia	Armenia	2–0	3–0	2011 FIFA Women's World Cup qualification
3.	15 February 2012	Estádio Municipal do Cartaxo, Cartaxo, Portugal	Armenia	2–0	6–0	UEFA Women's Euro 2013 qualification
4.	31 October 2013	Olympisch Stadion, Antwerp, Belgium	Belgium	1–0	1–4	2015 FIFA Women's World Cup qualification
5.	27 October 2015	Estádio Comendador Joaquim de Almeida Freitas, Moreira de Cónegos, Portugal	Republic of Ireland	1–0	1–2	UEFA Women's Euro 2017 qualification
6.	19 January 2016	Centro de Estágios de Melgaço, Melgaço, Portugal	Poland	1–0	1–0	Friendly
7.	24 November 2017	Estádio do Bonfim, Setúbal, Portugal	Moldova	3–0	8–0	2019 FIFA Women's World Cup qualification
8.	24 November 2017	Estádio do Bonfim, Setúbal, Portugal	Moldova	7–0	8–0	2019 FIFA Women's World Cup qualification
9.	28 February 2018	Estádio Municipal de Lagos, Lagos, Portugal	China	2–1	2–1	2018 Algarve Cup
10.	19 November 2018	Estádio Municipal de Rio Maior, Rio Maior, Portugal	Wales	1–0	1–0	Friendly
11.	14 June 2021	Shell Energy Stadium, Houston, United States	Nigeria	2–0	3–3	Friendly
12.	19 September 2021	Haberfeld Stadium, Rishon LeZion, Israel	Israel	4–0	4–0	2023 FIFA Women's World Cup qualification
13.	26 October 2021	Stadion Lokomotiv, Plovdiv, Bulgaria	Bulgaria	5–0	5–0	2023 FIFA Women's World Cup qualification
14.	12 April 2022	Estádio Cidade de Barcelos, Barcelos, Portugal	Bulgaria	3–0	3–0	2023 FIFA Women's World Cup qualification
15.	25 June 2022	Estádio António Coimbra da Mota, Estoril, Portugal	Greece	1–0	1–0	Friendly
16.	13 July 2022	Leigh Sports Village, Leigh, England	Netherlands	1–2	2–3	UEFA Women's Euro 2022
17.	11 October 2022	Estádio da Mata Real, Paços de Ferreira, Portugal	Iceland	1–0	4–1 (a.e.t.)	2023 FIFA Women's World Cup qualification – UEFA play-offs
18.	22 February 2023	Waikato Stadium, Hamilton, New Zealand	Cameroon	2–1	2–1	2023 FIFA Women's World Cup qualification
19.	26 September 2023	Estádio Cidade de Barcelos, Barcelos, Portugal	Norway	2–1	3–2	2023–24 UEFA Women's Nations League
20.	26 September 2023	Estádio Cidade de Barcelos, Barcelos, Portugal	Norway	3–2	3–2	2023–24 UEFA Women's Nations League
21.	5 April 2024	Estádio Dr. Magalhães Pessoa, Leiria, Portugal	Bosnia and Herzegovina	1–0	3–0	UEFA Women's Euro 2025 qualifying
22.	9 April 2024	Centenary Stadium, Ta' Qali, Malta	Malta	1–0	2–0	UEFA Women's Euro 2025 qualifying
23.	31 May 2024	Estádio Dr. Magalhães Pessoa, Leiria, Portugal	Northern Ireland	1–0	4–0	UEFA Women's Euro 2025 qualifying
24.	26 February 2025	Den Dreef, Leuven, Belgium	Belgium	1–0	1–0	2025 UEFA Women's Nations League
25.	4 April 2025	Estádio Capital do Móvel, Paços de Ferreira, Portugal	Spain	2–3	2–4	2025 UEFA Women's Nations League
26.	13 October 2026	Estádio Municipal de Portimão, Portimão, Portugal	Northern Ireland	3–1	3–1	2027 FIFA Women's World Cup qualification play-offs
