= Tatiana Pinto =

Portuguese footballer (born 1994)

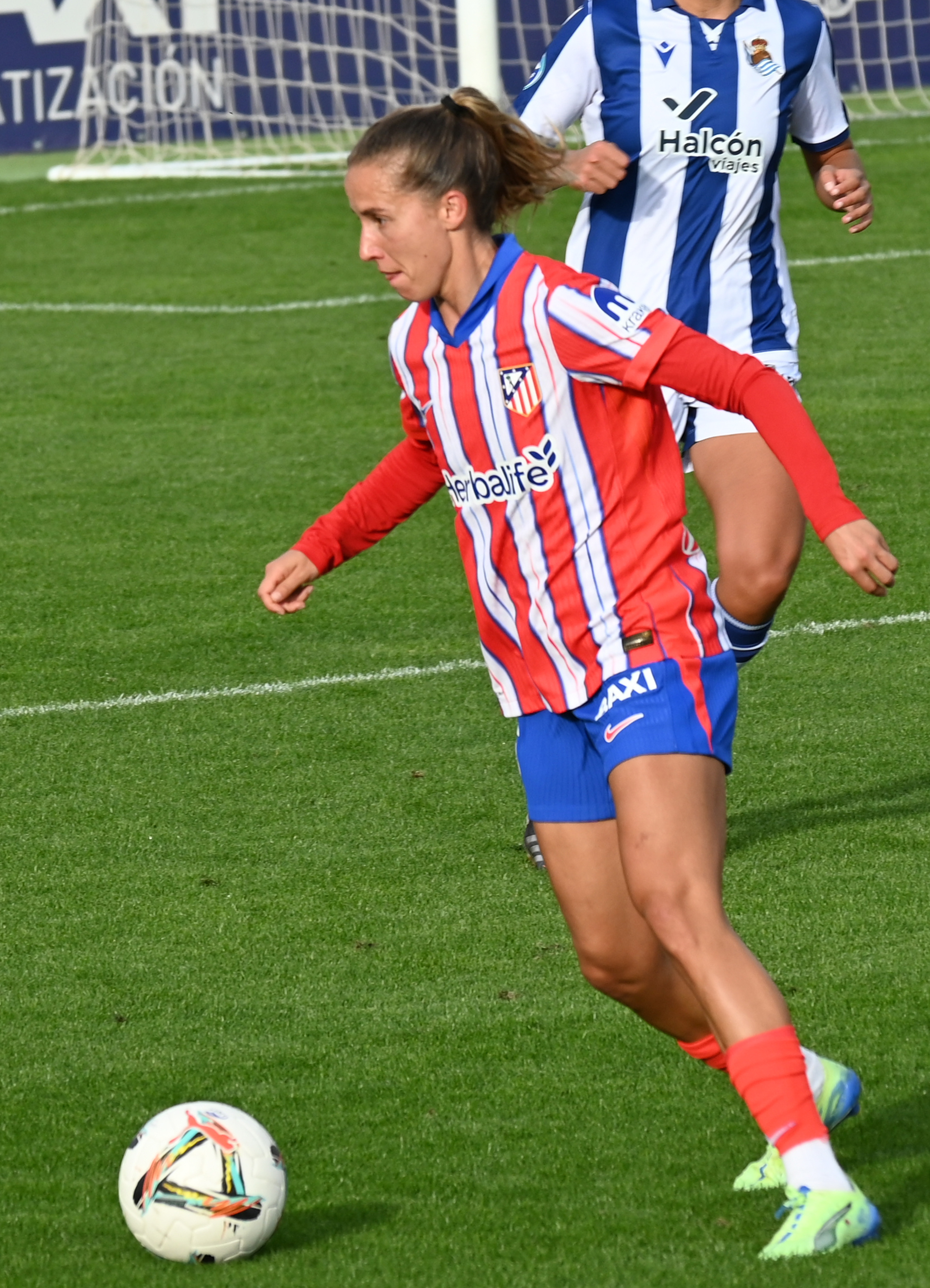
- Pinto with Atlético Madrid in 2024

Personal information
- Full name: Tatiana Vanessa Ferreira Pinto
- Date of birth: 28 March 1994 (age 32)
- Place of birth: Oliveira do Bairro, Portugal
- Height: 1.60 m (5 ft 3 in)
- Position: Midfielder

Team information
- Current team: Juventus
- Number: 29

Senior career*
Years	Team	Apps	(Gls)
2011–2013	Clube de Albergaria	13	(8)
2013–2014	SC Sand	9	(1)
2015	Valadares Gaia	0	(0)
2015–2016	Bristol City	7	(1)
2016–2021	Sporting CP	100	(28)
2021–2023	Levante	54	(15)
2023–2024	Brighton & Hove Albion	20	(2)
2024–2025	Atlético Madrid	29	(3)
2025–	Juventus	22	(5)

International career^{‡}
2010–2013	Portugal U19	24	(0)
2014–	Portugal	129	(7)
- * Club domestic league appearances and goals as of 1 December 2025 ‡ National team caps and goals as of 24 July 2025

Tatiana Vanessa Ferreira Pinto (born 28 March 1994) is a Portuguese professional footballer plays as a midfielder for Serie A club Juventus and the Portugal national team.

== Club career ==
After spells abroad with SC Sand and Bristol City, Pinto returned to her home country in summer 2016. She signed with the newly formed women's team of Sporting CP; the club she supports. In 2020, she ended her contract with Sporting and signed for Levante.

On 6 September 2023, Brighton & Hove Albion announced the signing of Pinto. On 5 June 2024, Brighton reported that Pinto, and three other players, would leave when their contracts expire in June.

On 21 August 2025, Pinto joined Juventus by signing a contract until 2027.

== International career ==
On 30 May 2023, Pinto was included in the Portugal's 23-player squad for the FIFA Women's World Cup 2023.

On 24 June 2025, Pinto was called up to the Portugal squad for the UEFA Women's Euro 2025.

== Career statistics ==
=== Club ===
As of match played 7 June 2025

Appearances and goals by club, season and competition
Club	Season	League			National cup (Note: Includes Taça de Portugal, Women's FA Cup, DFB-Pokal, Copa de la Reina)		League cup (Note: Includes Taça da Liga, FA Women's League Cup)		Continental (Note: Includes UEFA Women's Champions League)		Other (Note: Includes Supertaça de Portugal, Supercopa de España)		Total	
Club	Season	Division	Apps	Goals	Apps	Goals	Apps	Goals	Apps	Goals	Apps	Goals	Apps	Goals
Clube de Albergaria	2010–11	Campeonato Nacional Feminino	2	0	0	0	—		—		—		2	0
Clube de Albergaria	2011–12	Campeonato Nacional Feminino	4	3	2	0	—		—		—		6	3
Clube de Albergaria	2012–13	Campeonato Nacional Feminino	5	0	0	0	—		—		—		5	0
Clube de Albergaria	Total		11	3	2	0	—		—		—		13	3
SC Sand	2013–14	2. Frauen-Bundesliga	9	1	0	0	—		—		—		9	1
SC Sand	2014–15	Frauen-Bundesliga	0	0	0	0	—		—		—		0	0
SC Sand	Total		9	1	0	0	—		—		—		9	1
Bristol City	2015	Women's Super League	7	1	?	?	6	0	—		—		13	1
Bristol City	2016	Women's Super League	0	0	0	0	0	0	—		—		0	0
Bristol City	Total		7	1	0	0	6	0	—		—		13	1
Sporting CP	2016–17	Campeonato Nacional Feminino	23	11	4	0	—		—		—		27	11
Sporting CP	2017–18	Campeonato Nacional Feminino	19	10	5	1	—		3	2	1	0	28	13
Sporting CP	2018–19	Campeonato Nacional Feminino	20	3	1	1	—		3	0	1	0	25	4
Sporting CP	2019–20	Campeonato Nacional Feminino	15	1	2	0	3	0	—		—		20	1
Sporting CP	2020–21	Campeonato Nacional Feminino	23	3	0	0	3	0	—		—		26	3
Sporting CP	Total	Campeonato Nacional Feminino	100	28	12	2	6	0	6	2	2	0	126	32
Levante	2021–22	Segunda División Pro	24	3	1	0	—		4	0	1	0	30	3
Levante	2022–23	Liga F	30	12	1	0	—		—		—		31	12
Levante	Total		54	15	2	0	—		4	0	1	0	61	15
Brighton & Hove Albion	2023–24	Women's Super League	20	2	3	2	4	1	—		—		27	5
Atlético Madrid	2024-25	Liga F	27	3	5	0	—		2	0	1	0	35	3
Career total			228	53	24	4	16	1	12	2	4	0	284	60

=== International ===
As of match played 3 June 2025

Appearances and goals by national team and year
National team	Year	Apps	Goals
Portugal	2014	2	0
Portugal	2015	6	0
Portugal	2016	9	1
Portugal	2017	15	0
Portugal	2018	17	0
Portugal	2019	12	0
Portugal	2020	6	0
Portugal	2021	12	0
Portugal	2022	17	3
Portugal	2023	15	2
Portugal	2024	8	1
Portugal	2025	6	0
Total		125	7

Scores and results list Portugal's goal tally first, score column indicates score after each Pinto goal.

List of international goals scored by Tatiana Pinto
No.	Date	Venue	Opponent	Score	Result	Competition
1	5 March 2016	Complexo Desportivo, Vila Real de Santo António, Portugal	Brazil	1–2	1–3	2016 Algarve Cup
2	17 February 2022	Estádio Municipal Fernando Cabrita, Lagos, Portugal	Norway	1–0	2–0	2022 Algarve Cup
3	12 October 2022	Estádio da Mata Real, Paços de Ferreira, Portugal	Iceland	3–1	4–1	2023 FIFA Women's World Cup qualification
4	11 November 2022	Estádio Municipal José Martins Vieira, Almada, Portugal	Haiti	4–0	5–0	Friendly
5	17 February 2023	Waikato Stadium, Hamilton, New Zealand	New Zealand	5–0	5–0	Friendly
6	27 October 2023	Stadion Schnabelholz, Altach, Austria	Austria	1–2	1–2	2023–24 UEFA Women's Nations League
7	25 October 2024	Dalga Arena, Baku, Azerbaijan	Azerbaijan	2–0	4–1	UEFA Women's Euro 2025 qualifying play-offs
8	14 April 2026	Daugava Stadium, Riga, Latvia	Latvia	2–0	3–0	2027 FIFA Women's World Cup qualification

== Honours ==
Sporting

- Campeonato Nacional Feminino: 2016–17, 2017–18
- Taça de Portugal: 2016–17, 2017–18
- Supertaça de Portugal: 2017

Atlético Madrid

- Copa de la Reina de Fútbol runner-up: 2024-25
