= 2024–25 Campeonato Nacional Feminino =

Portuguese women's football league season

Campeonato Nacional Feminino
- Season: 2024–25
- Dates: 30 August 2024 – 11 May 2025
- Champions: Benfica (5th title)
- Relegated: Länk Vilaverdense
- Champions League: Benfica; Sporting CP; Braga
- Matches: 132
- Goals: 434 (3.29 per match)
- Top goalscorer: Cristina Martín-Prieto (19 Goals)
- Biggest home win: Sporting CP 8–0 Clube de Albergaria; 16 November 2024 Valadares Gaia 8–0 Länk Vilaverdense; 9 February 2025
- Biggest away win: Länk Vilaverdense 0–9 Sporting CP; 25 January 2025
- Highest scoring: Länk Vilaverdense 0–9 Sporting CP; 25 January 2025
- Longest winning run: 11 matches Benfica
- Longest unbeaten run: 20 matches Benfica
- Longest winless run: 20 matches Länk Vilaverdense
- Longest losing run: 20 matches Länk Vilaverdense
- All statistics correct as of 11 May 2025.

The 2024–25 of the Campeonato Nacional, also known as Liga BPI for sponsorship reasons, was the 40th iteration of Portuguese women's top-level league. Benfica were the defending champions, having won their fourth title in the 2023–24 season, and successfully revalidated their title with their fifth consecutive league trophy.

The schedule for the first half of the season was announced on 12 July 2024. The first matchday was scheduled for 1 September 2024, but some matches were rescheduled and played on 30 and 31 August 2024. The schedule was originally announced up till 11th matchday on 5 January 2025. The final matches are expected to be played on 11 May 2025.

As part of the planned changes to the women's league framework in Portugal culminating with the 2026–27 season, the Campeonato Nacional is being reduced from 12 to 10 teams in the 2025–26 season. As a result, two extra teams, for a total of three, are directly relegated to Campeonato Nacional II Divisão in the 2024–25 season. The relegation play-off is still played, with the team that finishes in 9th participating.

Länk Vilaverdense were relegated in March, accumulating zero points over the course of the season.

== Teams ==
Locations of teams in the 2024–25 Campeonato Nacional. See cutout below for Madeira-based teams.
Locations of Madeira-based teams in the 2024–25 Campeonato Nacional.

Since this 2024/25 season, there has been a major change: as a rule, all games must be played on natural grass, and as a result, several teams have been forced to change venues.

Team	Home city	Home ground	Capacity	2023–24 result
Clube de Albergaria	Oliveira de Azeméis	Estádio do Mergulhão	5,000	9th
Benfica	Seixal	Benfica Campus	2,721	1st
Braga	Braga	Estádio 1º de Maio	28,000	5th
Braga	Braga	Estádio Amélia Morais	2,500	5th
Damaiense	Lisbon	Estádio Engenheiro Carlos Salema	4,000	4th
Estoril Praia	Estoril	Estádio António Coimbra da Mota	5,100	1st (II Divisão)
Famalicão	Vila Nova de Famalicão	Academia F.C. Famalicão	500	10th
Marítimo	Funchal	Campo da Imaculada Conceição	1,824	7th
Racing Power	Oeiras	Estádio Nacional do Jamor	37,593	3rd
Sporting CP	Alcochete	Estádio Aurélio Pereira	1,180	2nd
Torreense	Torres Vedras	Estádio Manuel Marques	2,431	8th
Valadares Gaia	Vila Nova de Gaia	Estádio do Canelas	7,000	6th
Länk Vilaverdense	Vila Verde	Campo da Cruz do Reguengo	1,000	11th

=== Team changes ===
Entering league	Exiting league
Promoted from 2023–24 II Divisão	Relegated to 2024–25 II Divisão
Estoril Praia	Atlético Ouriense

== League table ==
Pos	Team	Pld	W	D	L	GF	GA	GD	Pts	Qualification or relegation
1	Benfica (C)	22	20	2	0	65	10	+55	62	Qualification for the Champions League league stage
2	Sporting CP	22	17	3	2	66	9	+57	54	Qualification for the Champions League second round
3	Braga	22	13	3	6	51	17	+34	42	Qualification for the Champions League first round
4	Torreense	22	13	2	7	46	22	+24	41	
5	Valadares Gaia	22	12	2	8	44	24	+20	38	
6	Racing Power	22	9	7	6	35	23	+12	34	
7	Marítimo	22	9	3	10	28	26	+2	30	
8	Damaiense	22	8	2	12	22	29	−7	26	
9	Famalicão (R)	22	7	2	13	32	54	−22	23	Participates in the relegation play-off
10	Estoril Praia (R)	22	5	4	13	28	49	−21	19	Relegation to 2025–26 II Divisão
11	Clube de Albergaria (R)	22	3	2	17	13	60	−47	11	Relegation to 2025–26 II Divisão
12	Länk Vilaverdense (R)	22	0	0	22	4	111	−107	0	Relegation to 2025–26 II Divisão

Updated to match(es) played on 11 May 2025. Source: FPF.pt
Rules for classification: 1) Points; 2) Goal difference; 3) Number of goals scored;
(C) Champions; (R) Relegated

== Results ==
Home \ Away	ALB	BEN	BRA	DAM	EST	FAM	MAR	RAC	SPO	TOR	VAL	VIL
Clube de Albergaria		1–3	0–3	0–1	0–3	2–2	2–0	1–2	0–6	0–2	0–4	2–1
Benfica	5–0		3–1	2–0	6–1	4–0	2–0	4–1	1–1	2–1	3–0	6–0
Braga	4–0	1–2		2–1	1–2	6–1	0–0	2–0	1–1	4–1	3–0	4–0
Damaiense	1–0	0–2	2–1		2–1	3–0	0–2	1–1	0–1	1–2	1–1	2–0
Estoril Praia	0–0	1–4	1–2	0–2		3–1	0–0	0–0	1–6	0–4	0–1	2–0
Famalicão	2–0	1–3	0–6	3–0	2–2		0–3	1–4	1–3	0–5	0–2	7–1
Marítimo	2–0	0–1	0–1	2–1	3–1	0–1		1–1	0–3	1–0	1–0	6–0
Racing Power	3–0	0–2	0–0	3–0	3–2	0–2	2–0		0–0	1–1	0–0	4–0
Sporting CP	8–0	0–2	2–0	2–0	3–0	5–0	3–0	3–0		1–2	2–1	4–0
Torreense	2–0	1–1	0–2	2–0	3–2	1–2	5–1	1–0	0–2		3–1	3–0
Valadares Gaia	5–0	0–3	1–0	2–0	6–2	1–0	3–1	2–3	0–1	1–0		8–0
Länk Vilaverdense	1–5	0–4	0–7	0–4	0–4	0–6	0–5	0–7	0–9	0–7	1–5	

Updated to match(es) played on 11 May 2025. Source: FPF.pt
Legend: Blue = home team win; Yellow = draw; Red = away team win.

== Relegation play-off ==
The team that finishes 9th participates in a two-leg play-off against the runners-up of the 2024–25 Campeonato II Divisão.

Team 1	Agg.	Team 2	1st leg	2nd leg
Position 9	–	II Divisão Position 2	–	–

2025
CEST (UTC+2)
1st leg

–

2025
CEST (UTC+2)
2nd leg

–

== Statistical leaders ==
=== Top scorers ===
As of 11 May 2025

Rank	Player	Club	Goals
1	(Spain) Cristina Martín-Prieto	Benfica	19
2	(Brazil) Taty Sena	Braga	15
3	(United States) Jennie Lakip	Valadares Gaia	13
4	(Brazil) Janaina Weimer	Torreense	12
5	(Portugal) Vanessa Marques	Racing Power	10
6	(Brazil) Malu Schmidt	Braga	9
7	(Portugal) Ana Capeta	Sporting CP	8
8	(Portugal) Sara Brasil	Estoril Praia	8
9	(United States) Brittany Raphino	Sporting CP	7
10	(Brazil) Maiara Niehues	Sporting CP	7
11	(Portugal) Telma Encarnação	Sporting CP	7
12	(United States) Sofia Lewis	Marítimo	7

=== Top assists ===
Rank	Player	Club	Assists
1	(Portugal) Beatriz Fonseca	Sporting CP	8
2	(Norway) Marit Bratberg Lund	Benfica	7
2	(Germany) Anna Gasper	Benfica	7
2	(Brazil) Karoline Cardozo	FC Famalicão	7
5	(Canada) Chandra Davidson	Benfica	6
5	(Venezuela) Daniuska Rodríguez	Torreense	6
5	(Brazil) Nycole Raysla	Benfica	6
5	(Portugal) Laura Luís	Clube de Albergaria	6
5	(Brazil) Sissi	Braga	6
5	(Portugal) Ana Borges	Sporting CP	6

=== Clean sheets ===
Rank	Player	Club	Clean sheets
1	(United States) Hannah Seabert	Sporting CP	13
2	(United States) Erin Seppi	Valadares Gaia	10
3	(Germany) Lena Pauels	Benfica	9
3	(Portugal) Patrícia Morais	Braga	9
5	(Cameroon) Michaely Bihina	Racing Power	8
5	(Netherlands) Nicole Panis	Marítimo	8
7	(Brazil) Janny Belém	Torreense	6
8	(Portugal) Carolina Jóia	Damaiense	4
8	(Portugal) Adriana Rocha	Estoril Praia	4
10	(Brazil) Aline Lima	Braga	2
10	(Portugal) Rute Costa	Benfica	2
10	(United States) Amber Lockwood	Clube de Albergaria	2
10	(Portugal) Daniela Araújo	FC Famalicão	2

== See also ==
- Taça da Liga Feminina
- Taça de Portugal Feminina
- Supertaça de Portugal Feminina
