= 2019–20 Campeonato Nacional Feminino =

35th edition of Campeonato Nacional de Futebol Feminino

Campeonato Nacional Feminino
- Season: 2019–20
- Dates: 15 September 2019 – 08 April 2020
- Champions League: Benfica
- Matches: 89
- Goals: 420 (4.72 per match)
- Top goalscorer: Cloé Lacasse (23 goals)
- Biggest home win: Benfica 24–0 A-dos-Francos (15 September 2019)
- Biggest away win: A-dos-Francos 0–17 Sporting CP (22 September 2019)
- Highest scoring: Benfica 24–0 A-dos-Francos (15 September 2019)
- All statistics correct as of 12 October 2019.

The 2019–20 Campeonato Nacional Feminino (also known as Liga BPI for sponsorship reasons) is the 35th edition of Campeonato Nacional Feminino.

On 8 April 2020 the Portuguese Football Federation cancelled all non-professional competitions in the country due to the COVID-19 pandemic in Portugal. No titles were awarded, and no teams will be promoted or relegated. Benfica was later appointed to the UEFA Champions League qualifying round as table leaders at the time of interruption.

On 19 October 2019 Benfica hosted the first official female Lisbon derby on Estádio da Luz against Sporting CP. The game ended 3–0 for the home team and established a new attendance record of 12,812 people on a women's football match in Portugal.

== Teams ==
Location of teams in 2019–20 Campeonato Nacional Feminino (Mainland)
Location of teams in 2019–20 Campeonato Nacional Feminino (Madeira)

Twelve teams compete in the league – ten teams from the 2018–19 Campeonato Nacional, as well as two teams promoted from the Campeonato de Promoção.

The team changes were the following:

- Boavista and Vilaverdense were the teams relegated, finishing 11th and 12th, respectively.
- Benfica, the winner of Campeonato Nacional II Divisão and Cadima, were the teams promoted.

=== Stadia and locations ===
Team	Location	Stadium	Capacity
A-dos-Francos	Caldas da Rainha	Campo Municipal Quinta Boneca	2,000
Atlético Ouriense	Ourém	Campo da Caridade	260
Benfica	Alcântara	Estádio da Tapadinha	4,000
Braga	Braga	Estádio 1º de Maio	28,000
Cadima	Cantanhede	Complexo Desportivo de Cantanhede	2,000
Clube de Albergaria	Albergaria-a-Velha	Estádio Municipal António Augusto Martins Pereira	1,500
Estoril	Estoril	Centro de Treino e Formação Desportiva	0
Futebol Benfica	Lisbon	Estádio Francisco Lázaro	1,500
Marítimo	Funchal	Campo Complexo Desportivo C.F. Andorinha	500
Ovarense	Ovar	Estádio Marques Silva	3,200
Sporting CP	Alcochete	CGD Stadium Aurélio Pereira	1,128
Valadares Gaia	Vila Nova de Gaia	Complexo Desportivo Valadares	750

== Season summary ==
=== League table ===
Season abandoned after 15 match days.

Pos	Team	Pld	W	D	L	GF	GA	GD	Pts	Qualification or relegation
1	Benfica	15	14	0	1	101	4	+97	42 (Note: Head-to-head away goals: Benfica 2, Sporting 0)	Qualification for UEFA Champions League qualifying round (Note: Benfica was awarded the UEFA Champions League qualifying round as table leaders at the time of interruption, despite not receiving champions title.)
2	Sporting CP	15	14	0	1	69	10	+59	42	
3	Braga	15	11	1	3	61	10	+51	34	
4	Estoril	15	8	1	6	26	27	−1	25	
5	Futebol Benfica	15	8	0	7	31	29	+2	24	
6	Marítimo	14	7	0	7	22	28	−6	21	
7	Valadares Gaia	15	6	1	8	24	40	−16	19	
8	Atlético Ouriense	15	5	3	7	27	27	0	18	
9	Clube de Albergaria	15	5	2	8	24	25	−1	17	
10	Ovarense	14	2	3	9	15	40	−25	9	
11	Cadima	15	1	3	11	12	54	−42	6	~~Relegation to Campeonato Nacional II Divisão~~ (Note: Due to the COVID-19 pandemic in Portugal, no teams were relegated.)
12	A-dos-Francos	15	1	0	14	8	126	−118	3	~~Relegation to Campeonato Nacional II Divisão~~

Source: FPF, zerozero.pt
Rules for classification: 1) Points; 2) Head-to-head points; 3) Head-to-head goal difference; 4) Goal difference; 5) Matches won; 6) Goals scored; 7) Play-off.

=== Positions by round ===
The table lists the positions of teams after each week of matches. In order to preserve chronological evolvements, any postponed matches are not included to the round at which they were originally scheduled, but added to the full round they were played immediately afterwards.

Team ╲ Round	1	2	3	4	5	6	7	8	9	10	11	12	13	14	15
A-dos-Francos	12	12	12	12	12	12	12	12	12	12	12	12	12	12	12
Atlético Ouriense	4	4	3	5	4	5	6	4	4	5	5	7	6	8	8
Benfica	1	1	1	1	1	1	1	1	1	1	1	1	1	1	1
Braga	7	6	5	4	3	3	3	3	3	3	3	3	3	3	3
Cadima	10	9	10	9	9	10	11	11	11	11	11	11	11	11	11
Clube de Albergaria	10	5	7	8	7	7	7	7	7	9	9	9	9	9	9
Estoril	4	8	9	10	10	9	8	9	8	7	6	4	4	5	4
Futebol Benfica	2	3	4	6	5	4	4	6	5	4	4	5	5	4	—
Marítimo	7	10	8	7	8	8	9	8	9	8	7	6	7	6	—
Ovarense	7	11	11	11	11	11	10	10	10	10	10	10	10	10	10
Sporting CP	4	2	2	2	2	2	2	2	2	2	2	2	2	2	2
Valadares Gaia	2	7	6	3	6	6	5	5	6	6	8	8	8	7	7

Leader and UEFA Champions League qualifying round
Relegation to Campeonato Nacional II Divisão

Source: Liga BPI (in Portuguese)

=== Results ===
Home \ Away	ADF	OUR	BEN	BRA	CAD	ALB	EST	CFB	MAR	OVA	SCP	VAL
A-dos-Francos	—	1–10	0–14		2–6	1–11			1–2	1–2	0–17	
Atlético Ouriense		—		0–4	3–3	0–3	1–1	1–2	1–2	2–0	0–2	
Benfica	24–0	4–0	—		10–0	4–0	5–0			6–0	3–0	
Braga	9–0		0–2	—	8–0		2–0	4–0	5–1		2–4	7–0
Cadima	0–1	0–0		0–7	—			0–2		1–2	0–8	0–3
Clube de Albergaria		2–1		0–3	0–0	—	2–0	2–1		1–1	1–2	1–3
Estoril	9–0		0–7		3–0	1–0	—		2–0	2–1	0–4	4–2
Futebol Benfica	7–0	1–2	1–2	0–6		3–0	1–3	—	3–1			4–0
Marítimo	6–2	0–1	0–5	0–2	2–0	3–0			—			
Ovarense			0–7	1–1			0–1	3–4	2–3	—	0–3	2–2
Sporting CP	5–0		3–2	2–1				5–0	4–0	6–1	—	4–0
Valadares Gaia	4–0	2–5	0–6		3–2	2–1	2–0	0–2	1–2			—

Source: FPF
Legend: Blue = home team win; Yellow = draw; Red = away team win.

== Statistics ==
=== Top scorers ===
Rank	Player	Team	Goals
1	(Canada) Cloé Lacasse	Benfica	23
2	(Brazil) Darlene	Benfica	20
3	(Brazil) Raquel Fernandes	Sporting CP	15
4	(Brazil) Nycole Raysla	Benfica	13
5	(New Zealand) Hannah Wilkinson	Sporting CP	12
6	(Portugal) Carolina Mendes	Sporting CP	10
7	(Portugal) Érica Costa	Marítimo	9
7	(Portugal) Francisca Cardoso	Braga	9
7	(Portugal) Carlota Cristo	Valadares Gaia	9
10	3 players	Various	8
