= 2015–16 Campeonato Nacional Feminino =

Campeonato Nacional de Futebol Feminino
- Season: 2015–16
- Champions: CF Benfica
- Relegated: Fundação Laura Santos; Cadima
- Champions League: CF Benfica
- Matches: 132
- Goals: 495 (3.75 per match)
- Top goalscorer: Sara Brasil (23 goals)

The 2015–16 Campeonato Nacional de Futebol Feminino was the 31st edition of the top division of the Portugal women's football championship. It started on 5 September 2015 and ended on 19 June 2016. Viseu 2001 ADSC and União Recreativa Cadima were promoted to the category, replacing Leixões SC and FC Cesarense.

CF Benfica won the championship for the second time and qualified for the Champions League. Clube de Albergaria was the runner-up, and Valadares Gaia FC was third. Fundação Laura Santos and Cadima were the teams relegated.

== Teams ==
Location of the ten teams in the 2015-16 Campeonato Nacional

Team	Location	Stadium	Capacity
Atlético Ouriense	Ourém	Campo da Caridade	2,500
GDC A-dos-Francos	Caldas da Raínha	Campo Luís Duarte	1,000
CF Benfica	Lisbon	Estádio Francisco Lázaro	1,500
Clube de Albergaria	Albergaria-a-Velha	Municipal António Martins Pereira	2,000
Boavista FC	Porto	Estádio do Bessa Século XXI	28,263
Vilaverdense FC	Vila Verde	Campo Cruz do Reguengo	5,000
Valadares Gaia FC	Gulpilhares e Valadares	Complexo Desportivo de Valadares	500
Cadima	Cadima, Cantanhede	Complexo Desportivo de Cantanhede	2,000
Fundacão Laura Santos	Gouveia	Municipal do Farvão	5,000
Viseu 2001 ADSC	Viseu	Estádio do Fontelo	12,000

== First stage ==
Pos	Team	G	W	D	L	GF	GA	Pts
1	Clube de Albergaria	18	16	1	1	44	10	49
2	Valadares Gaia FC	18	15	0	3	55	13	45
3	CF Benfica	18	14	2	2	49	6	44
4	GDC A-dos-Francos	18	9	2	7	41	43	29
5	Vilaverdense FC	18	8	3	7	43	30	27
6	Atlético Ouriense	18	8	3	7	26	21	27
7	Fundação Laura Santos	18	4	3	11	19	60	15
8	Viseu 2001 ADSC	18	2	4	12	17	41	10
9	Boavista FC	18	2	1	15	18	45	7
10	Cadima	18	0	5	13	9	52	5

== Second stage ==
Points of first stage have been halved and rounded-up.

=== Championship group ===
Pos	Team	G	W	D	L	GF	GA	Pts
1	CF Benfica	6	4	2	0	12	4	36
2	Clube de Albergaria	6	2	2	2	7	7	33
3	Valadares Gaia FC	6	3	1	2	13	7	33
4	GDC A-dos-Francos	6	0	1	5	7	21	16

2016-17 Champions League

	Ben	Alb	Val	Fr
CF Benfica		0-0	1-1	3-2
Clube de Albergaria	0-3		2-0	2-0
Valadares Gaia FC	1-2	1-0		3-1
GDC A-dos-Francos	0-3	3-3	1-7	

=== Relegation group ===
Pos	Team	G	W	D	L	GF	GA	Pts
5	Atlético Ouriense	10	7	1	2	33	14	36
6	Vilaverdense FC	10	6	1	3	30	17	33
7	Boavista FC	10	5	3	2	21	16	22
8	Viseu 2001 ADSC	10	4	2	4	18	14	19
9	Fundação Laura Santos	10	2	0	8	21	42	14
10	Cadima	10	1	3	6	12	32	9

Relegated

	Our	Vil	Boa	Vis	Fun	Cad
Atlético Ouriense		1-0	0-3	1-1	5-0	4-0
Vilaverdense FC	2-5		1-3	2-0	9-2	4-1
Boavista FC	2-0	3-2		2-3	1-0	4-2
Viseu 2001 ADSC	2-3	2-1	1-1		7-0	1-0
Fundação Laura Santos	1-6	3-6	2-3	3-2		8-0
Cadima	3-7	0-0	3-3	3-2	1-1	

== Top scorers ==
Rank	Player	Club	Goals
1	Sara Brasil	Vilaverdense FC	23
2	Vanessa Marques	Valadares Gaia FC	19
3	Joana Marchão	Atlético Ouriense	17
3	Catarina Sousa	GDC A-dos-Francos	17
5	Diana Silva	Clube de Albergaria	16
5	Adriana Gomes	Boavista FC	16
7	Edite Fernandes	Valadares Gaia FC	14
8	Daniela "Pipa" Alves	Fundação Laura Santos	12
9	Joana Flores	CF Benfica	11
9	Jéssica Silva	Clube de Albergaria	11
