= 2014–15 Campeonato Nacional Feminino =

Portugal women's football season

Location of the ten teams in the 2014-15 Campeonato Nacional

The 2014–15 Campeonato Nacional de Futebol Feminino was the 30th edition of the top division of the Portugal women's football championship. It started on 21 September 2014 and ended on 14 June 2015. Leixões SC and Fundação Laura Santos returned to the category on the first try, replacing Escola Setúbal and 12-times champion 1º Dezembro.

CF Benfica won the championship for the first time and qualified for the Champions League. Valadares Gaia FC was the runner-up, while defending champion Atlético Ouriense was third. Leixões and FC Cesarense were relegated.

== Teams ==
Team	2013-14	2014-15	Location	Stadium	Capacity
Atlético Ouriense	1st	3rd	Ourém	Campo da Caridade	2,500
A-dos-Francos	2nd	6th	Caldas da Raínha	Campo Luís Duarte	1,000
Benfica	3rd	1st	Lisbon	Estádio Francisco Lázaro	1,500
Albergaria	4th	5th	Albergaria-a-Velha	Municipal António Martins Pereira	2,000
Boavista	5th	8th	Porto	Estádio do Bessa Século XXI	28,263
Vilaverdense	6th	7th	Vila Verde	Campo Cruz do Reguengo	5,000
Valadares Gaia FC	7th	2nd	Gulpilhares e Valadares	Complexo Desportivo de Valadares	500
Cesarense	8th	10th	Cesar	Estádio do Mergulhão	5,000
Fundação Santos	Promoted	4th	Gouveia	Municipal do Farvão	5,000
Leixões SC	Promoted	9th	Leça da Palmeira	Complexo da Bataria	2,500

== First stage ==
Pos	Team	G	W	D	L	GF	GA	Pts
1	Atlético Ouriense	18	13	3	2	48	13	42
2	Benfica	18	13	2	3	41	9	41
3	Valadares Gaia FC	18	13	2	3	40	11	41
4	Fundação Santos	18	8	4	6	37	35	28
5	A-dos-Francos	18	8	4	6	37	23	28
6	Albergaria	18	8	3	7	37	25	27
7	Vilaverdense	18	6	3	9	22	32	21
8	Leixões	18	3	5	10	24	42	14
9	Boavista	18	3	3	12	18	47	12
10	Cesarense	18	0	1	17	10	77	1

Championship group	Relegation group

	Our	Ben	Val	Fun	Fra	Alb	Vil	Lei	Boa	Ces
Atlético Ouriense		1-0	2-0	6-0	3-0	2-3	1-1	3-0	4-1	6-0
Benfica	1-1		1-0	2-1	1-1	1-0	4-0	2-0	3-0	6-0
Valadares Gaia	1-0	1-0		3-0	1-0	1-2	2-0	1-1	2-0	6-0
Fundação Santos	1-4	0-3	1-1		3-1	3-1	4-1	1-5	2-0	4-0
A-dos-Francos	2-3	2-0	0-4	1-2		4-1	1-0	1-1	4-0	7-1
Albergaria	1-2	1-3	0-1	1-1	0-0		1-2	2-1	7-1	2-0
Vilaverdense	2-3	0-1	2-4	2-2	0-3	0-0		2-1	1-0	3-0
Leixões	0-0	1-6	1-3	3-4	1-2	0-6	1-2		0-0	2-0
Boavista	0-2	0-5	0-5	1-1	2-2	2-3	2-3	4-1		3-1
Cesarense	0-5	0-2	1-4	0-7	0-6	1-6	1-2	4-4	1-2	

== Second stage ==
=== Championship group ===
Pos	Team	G	W	D	L	GF	GA	Pts
1	Benfica	6	5	1	0	16	2	37
2	Valadares Gaia FC	6	2	2	2	9	6	29
3	Atlético Ouriense	6	2	1	3	6	6	28
4	Fundação Santos	6	1	0	5	6	23	17

2015-16 Champions League

	Ben	Val	Our	Fun
Benfica		0-0	1-0	5-1
Valadares Gaia	0-2		0-2	2-1
Atlético Ouriense	0-1	1-1		2-0
Fundação Santos	1-7	0-6	3-1	

=== Relegation group ===
Pos	Team	G	W	D	L	GF	GA	Pts
5	Albergaria	10	10	0	0	38	11	44
6	A-dos-Francos	10	6	1	3	28	15	33
7	Vilaverdense	10	6	2	2	22	11	31
8	Boavista	10	3	2	5	21	24	17
9	Leixões	10	1	2	7	15	23	12
10	Cesarense	10	0	1	9	6	46	2

Relegated

	Alb	Fra	Vil	Boa	Lei	Ces
Albergaria		1-0	3-2	9-2	3-1	3-0
A-dos-Francos	3-5		1-3	3-1	4-0	4-1
Vilaverdense	1-3	1-1		3-1	2-1	4-0
Boavista	1-4	1-2	0-0		4-1	6-0
Leixões	0-1	1-4	1-2	1-1		8-1
Cesarense	1-6	1-6	0-4	1-4	1-1	
