= 2021–22 Campeonato Nacional Feminino =

36th edition of Campeonato Nacional de Futebol Feminino

Campeonato Nacional Feminino
- Season: 2021–22
- Champions: Benfica (2nd title)
- All statistics correct as of 17 May 2022.

The 2021–22 Campeonato Nacional Feminino (also known as Liga BPI for sponsorship reasons) is the 37th edition of Campeonato Nacional Feminino.

On 8 May 2022, Benfica beat Sporting CP at home by 3–1 and became champions for the second time in their history.

== Teams ==
Location of teams in 2021–22 Campeonato Nacional Feminino (Mainland)
Red: North Serie; Blue: South Serie.
Location of teams in 2021–22 Campeonato Nacional Feminino (Madeira)
Blue: South Serie.

16 teams contested the Campeonato Nacional de Futebol Feminino in 2021–22.

=== Team changes ===
To Campeonato Nacional

- Vilaverdense (runners-up)
- Atlético CP (semifinal loser to Sporting CP B)

From Campeonato Nacional

- Cadima (North Serie 5th)
- Fiães (North Serie 6th)
- Futebol Benfica (South Serie 5th)
- A-dos-Francos (South Serie 6th)
- Ovarense (Play-off loser)
- Damaiense (Play-off loser)

== Format ==
The competition continued to be played in two stages, but the number of teams being reduced from 20 to 16. In the first stage, the 16 clubs will be divided in two series (North and South) of 8 teams, according to geographic criteria. In each series, teams play against each other once in a single round-robin system.

In the second stage, the four best-placed teams of each of the Series advanced to the championship group and the remaining teams to the relegation series. On the championship group, all eight teams play against each other in a home-and-away double round-robin system, to decide the champions. On the relegation series (North and South) the competition work in the same way, with the first and second placed teams being granted a place in 2022–23 Campeonato Nacional de Futebol Feminino. The eighth-placed team (last) was relegated while the teams place from third to seventh will play the relegation play-offs along with teams from Campeonato Nacional II Divisão placed second to fourth. Eight teams participate in the play-off, with the winner of each round advancing to the next one. Only the winner guarantees a place in 2022–23 Campeonato Nacional de Futebol Feminino.

== First stage ==
=== North Serie ===
Pos	Team	Pld	W	D	L	GF	GA	GD	Pts	Qualification
1	Braga	7	7	0	0	31	1	+30	21	Advance to Championship Group
2	Famalicão	7	5	1	1	22	3	+19	16	Advance to Championship Group
3	Länk Vilaverdense	7	4	1	2	17	10	+7	13	Advance to Championship Group
4	Clube de Albergaria	7	2	2	3	5	9	−4	8	Advance to Championship Group
5	Valadares Gaia	7	1	4	2	11	13	−2	7	Advance to Relegation North Serie
6	Condeixa	7	1	2	4	7	11	−4	5	Advance to Relegation North Serie
7	Varzim	7	1	1	5	3	23	−20	4	Advance to Relegation North Serie
8	Gil Vicente	7	1	1	5	3	29	−26	4	Advance to Relegation North Serie

Rules for classification: 1) Points, 2) Head-to-head points, 3) Head-to-head goal difference, 4) Goal difference, 5) Matches won, 6) Goals scored

=== South Serie ===
Pos	Team	Pld	W	D	L	GF	GA	GD	Pts	Qualification
1	Benfica	7	6	0	1	32	11	+21	18	Advance to Championship Group
2	Sporting CP	7	5	2	0	24	2	+22	17	Advance to Championship Group
3	Torreense	7	3	3	1	14	6	+8	12	Advance to Championship Group
4	Marítimo	7	3	2	2	12	6	+6	11	Advance to Championship Group
5	Amora	7	3	2	2	12	16	−4	11	Advance to Relegation South Serie
6	Atlético Ouriense	7	1	2	4	7	12	−5	5	Advance to Relegation South Serie
7	Estoril	7	0	2	5	2	19	−17	2	Advance to Relegation South Serie
8	Atlético CP	7	0	1	6	2	33	−31	1	Advance to Relegation South Serie

Rules for classification: 1) Points, 2) Head-to-head points, 3) Head-to-head goal difference, 4) Goal difference, 5) Matches won, 6) Goals scored

== Second stage ==
=== Championship group ===
Pos	Team	Pld	W	D	L	GF	GA	GD	Pts
1	Benfica	14	13	1	0	36	4	+32	40
2	Sporting CP	14	10	1	3	40	9	+31	31
3	Braga	14	8	1	5	24	10	+14	25
4	Famalicão	14	7	1	6	23	12	+11	22
5	Marítimo	14	7	0	7	25	36	−11	21
6	Torreense	14	4	3	7	14	21	−7	15
7	Clube de Albergaria	14	2	1	11	9	40	−31	7
8	Länk Vilaverdense	14	1	0	13	11	50	−39	3

Rules for classification: 1) Points, 2) Head-to-head points, 3) Head-to-head goal difference, 4) Goal difference, 5) Matches won, 6) Goals scored

=== Relegation Phase ===
Pos	Team	Pld	W	D	L	GF	GA	GD	Pts	Qualification
1	Amora	14	12	1	1	53	22	+31	37	Not relegated
2	Valadares Gaia	14	11	1	2	33	10	+23	34	Not relegated
3	Atlético Ouriense	14	9	1	4	26	17	+9	28	Relegation play-offs
4	Condeixa	14	6	2	6	28	21	+7	20	Relegation play-offs
5	Gil Vicente	14	5	1	8	15	36	−21	16	Relegation play-offs
6	Estoril	14	2	4	8	10	17	−7	10	Relegation play-offs
7	Varzim	14	2	3	9	15	29	−14	9	Relegation play-offs
8	Atlético CP	14	2	1	11	17	45	−28	7	Relegated

Rules for classification: 1) Points, 2) Head-to-head points, 3) Head-to-head goal difference, 4) Goal difference, 5) Matches won, 6) Goals scored

==== Relegation play-offs ====
The teams placed third to seventh in the relegation group and the teams placed second to four in the 2021-22 Second Division League played against each other in a play-off championship to define the last team to play the 2022–23 Campeonato Nacional de Futebol Feminino.

===== Quarter-finals =====
Team 1	Agg.	Team 2	1st leg	2nd leg
Rio Ave	2–4	Atlético Ouriense	1–2	2–1
Racing Power	3–0	Condeixa	1–0	0–2
Futebol Benfica	3–0	Gil Vicente	0–0	2–2
Varzim	3–3	Estoril	3–1	2–0

===== Semi-finals =====
Team 1	Agg.	Team 2	1st leg	2nd leg
Futebol Benfica	4–3	Racing Power	4–1	2–0
Estoril	1–2	Atlético Ouriense	1–0	2–0

===== Final =====
June 26, 2022	Atlético Ouriense	0 – 1	Futebol Benfica	Stadium of Rio Maior
17:00

Although Futebol Benfica won the play-off stage, they did not obtain the licensing required to participate in 2022–23 Campeonato Nacional de Futebol Feminino. Thus, Atlético Ouriense was invited instead.
