= 2020–21 Campeonato Nacional Feminino =

36th edition of Campeonato Nacional de Futebol Feminino

Campeonato Nacional Feminino
- Season: 2020–21
- Champions: Benfica (1st title)
- Relegated: A-dos-Francos; Cadima; Damaiense; Fiães; Futebol Benfica; Ovarense
- All statistics correct as of 14 June 2020.

The 2020–21 Campeonato Nacional Feminino (also known as Liga BPI for sponsorship reasons) is the 36th edition of Campeonato Nacional Feminino.

Due to the COVID-19 pandemic in Portugal, no teams were relegated on the previous season, and a total of eight teams from 2019–20 Campeonato Nacional II Divisão first stage series were promoted, one from each serie. This led to the implementation of a new format this season including all 20 teams.

== Teams ==
Location of teams in 2020–21 Campeonato Nacional Feminino (Mainland)
Red: North Serie; Blue: South Serie.
Lisbon teams
Blue: South Serie.
Location of teams in 2020–21 Campeonato Nacional Feminino (Madeira)
Blue: South Serie.

20 teams contested the Campeonato Nacional de Futebol Feminino in 2020–21.

=== Team changes ===
Due to the COVID-19 pandemic in Portugal, no teams were relegated on the previous season, and all the eight top placed teams from 2019–20 Campeonato Nacional II Divisão first stage series were promoted.

==== To Campeonato Nacional ====
Promoted from Campeonato Nacional II Divisão

- Gil Vicente (serie A)
- Famalicão (Serie B)
- Boavista (Serie C)
- Fiães (Serie D)
- Condeixa (Serie E)
- Torreense (Serie F)
- Damaiense (Serie G 2nd place)
- Amora (Serie H)

=== Stadia and Location ===
North Serie
Team	Location	Stadium	Capacity
Boavista	Porto (Ramalde)	Parque Desportivo de Ramalde	1,000
Braga	Braga	Estádio 1º de Maio	28,000
Cadima	Cantanhede (Cadima)	Complexo Desportivo de Cantanhede	2,000
Clube de Albergaria	Albergaria-a-Velha	Estádio Municipal António Augusto Martins Pereira	1,500
Condeixa	Condeixa-a-Nova	Estádio Municipal de Condeixa-a-Nova	918
Famalicão	Vila Nova de Famalicão	Academia do F.C. Famalicão	500
Fiães	Santa Maria da Feira (Fiães)	Estádio do Bolhão	11,000
Gil Vicente	Barcelos	Estádio Adelino Ribeiro Novo	8,500
Ovarense	Ovar	Estádio Marques da Silva	3,200
Valadares Gaia	Vila Nova de Gaia	Complexo Desportivo Valadares	750

South Serie
Team	Location	Stadium	Capacity
A-dos-Francos	Caldas da Rainha	Campo Luís Duarte	200
Amora	Amora	Parque do Serrado	0
Atlético Ouriense	Ourém	Campo da Caridade	260
Benfica	Lisbon (Alcântara)	Estádio da Tapadinha	4,000
Damaiense	Amadora	Complexo Desportivo Municipal Monte da Galega	2,000
Estoril	Estoril	Centro de Treino e Formação Desportiva	0
Futebol Benfica	Lisbon	Estádio Francisco Lázaro	1,500
Marítimo	Funchal	Campo Adelino Rodrigues	2,000
Sporting CP	Alcochete	CGD Stadium Aurélio Pereira	1,128
Torreense	Torres Vedras	Estádio Manuel Marques	12,000

== Format ==
The new competition format consists of two stages. In the first stage, the 20 clubs will be divided in two series (North and South) of 10 teams, according to geographic criteria. In each series, teams play against each other once in a single round-robin system.

In the second stage, the four best-placed teams of each of the Series advance to the championship group and remaining teams to the relegation series. On the championship group, all eight teams play against each other in a home-and-away double round-robin system, to decide the champions. On the relegation series (North and South), teams start with half the points they had on the first stage and play against each other in a home-and-away double round-robin system, the bottom two teams get relegated, and the 3rd and 4th-placed teams will play the relegation play-offs. The relegation play-offs are played home and away, and the losers are relegated.

== First stage ==
First Stage schedule was drawn on 28 August 2020 at FPF headquarters, and was originally set to be played from 27 September to 6 December 2020 but, due to restrictions imposed in response to the COVID-19 pandemic in Portugal, was concluded on 13 January 2021. Clubs advancing to the Championship Group also qualify to the league cup.

=== North Serie ===
Pos	Team	Pld	W	D	L	GF	GA	GD	Pts	Qualification
1	Famalicão	9	9	0	0	37	4	+33	27	Advance to Championship Group
2	Braga	9	8	0	1	38	5	+33	24	Advance to Championship Group
3	Clube de Albergaria	9	4	2	3	12	14	−2	14 (Note: Head-to-head points: Clube de Albergaria 4, Condeixa 3, Valadares Gaia 1.)	Advance to Championship Group
4	Condeixa	9	4	2	3	16	14	+2	14	Advance to Championship Group
5	Valadares Gaia	9	4	2	3	24	23	+1	14	Advance to Relegation North Serie
6	Ovarense	9	3	3	3	12	18	−6	12	Advance to Relegation North Serie
7	Boavista	9	3	0	6	7	27	−20	9	Advance to Relegation North Serie
8	Fiães	9	1	3	5	10	20	−10	6	Advance to Relegation North Serie
9	Gil Vicente	9	0	5	4	10	23	−13	5	Advance to Relegation North Serie
10	Cadima	9	0	1	8	6	24	−18	1	Advance to Relegation North Serie

Source: FPF.pt
Rules for classification: 1) Points, 2) Head-to-head points, 3) Head-to-head goal difference, 4) Goal difference, 5) Matches won, 6) Goals scored

=== South Serie ===
Pos	Team	Pld	W	D	L	GF	GA	GD	Pts	Qualification
1	Sporting CP	9	9	0	0	47	4	+43	27	Advance to Championship Group
2	Benfica	9	8	0	1	34	8	+26	24	Advance to Championship Group
3	Marítimo	9	5	1	3	18	13	+5	16	Advance to Championship Group
4	Torreense	9	4	3	2	19	16	+3	15	Advance to Championship Group
5	Estoril	9	4	1	4	13	13	0	13	Advance to Relegation South Serie
6	Damaiense	9	4	0	5	13	17	−4	12	Advance to Relegation South Serie
7	Amora	9	3	1	5	10	19	−9	10	Advance to Relegation South Serie
8	Atlético Ouriense	9	2	1	6	9	28	−19	7	Advance to Relegation South Serie
9	Futebol Benfica	9	2	0	7	5	21	−16	6	Advance to Relegation South Serie
10	A-dos-Francos	9	0	1	8	4	33	−29	1	Advance to Relegation South Serie

Source: FPF.pt
Rules for classification: 1) Points, 2) Head-to-head points, 3) Head-to-head goal difference, 4) Goal difference, 5) Matches won, 6) Goals scored

== Second stage ==
=== Championship group ===
Championship Group matches will be played from 19 December 2020 to 23 May 2021.

Pos	Team	Pld	W	D	L	GF	GA	GD	Pts	Qualification	BEN	SPO	BRA	FAM	CAL	MAR	TOR	CON
1	Benfica (C)	14	13	0	1	47	7	+40	39	Qualification for the Champions League first round	—	0–1	4–0	3–1	1–0	4–2	7–0	7–0
2	Sporting CP	14	11	1	2	30	7	+23	34		0–3	—	1–0	2–2	8–0	2–0	3–0	1–0
3	Braga	14	9	0	5	30	17	+13	27		1–2	2–1	—	1–4	4–1	2–1	7–0	2–0
4	Famalicão	14	7	2	5	31	20	+11	23		0–1	0–1	0–2	—	3–1	3–1	0–2	2–1
5	Clube de Albergaria	14	5	1	8	17	37	−20	16		0–4	0–4	0–1	3–3	—	2–1	2–1	5–2
6	Marítimo	14	5	0	9	22	24	−2	15		1–2	0–2	0–2	1–3	4–0	—	5–1	2–0
7	Torreense	14	3	1	10	15	48	−33	10		1–7	0–2	3–2	1–7	0–1	1–2	—	3–3
8	Condeixa	14	0	1	13	7	39	−32	1		0–2	0–2	0–4	0–3	1–2	0–2	0–2	—

Updated to match(es) played on 8 May 2021. Source: FPF.pt
Rules for classification: 1) Points, 2) Head-to-head points, 3) Head-to-head goal difference, 4) Goal difference, 5) Matches won, 6) Goals scored
(C) Champions

=== Relegation Groups ===
Relegation Groups' matches were played from 17 January to 25 April 2021.

==== North Serie ====
Pos	Team	Pld	W	D	L	GF	GA	GD	Pts	Qualification or relegation
1	Valadares Gaia	10	6	3	1	18	6	+12	28	
2	Boavista	10	5	2	3	20	8	+12	22	
3	Gil Vicente (O)	10	6	1	3	17	9	+8	22	Advance to relegation play-offs
4	Ovarense (R)	10	3	3	4	16	10	+6	18	Advance to relegation play-offs
5	Cadima (R)	10	4	1	5	10	20	−10	14	Relegation to Campeonato Nacional II Divisão
6	Fiães (R)	10	0	2	8	4	32	−28	5	Relegation to Campeonato Nacional II Divisão

Source: FPF.pt
Rules for classification: 1) Points, 2) Head-to-head points, 3) Head-to-head goal difference, 4) Goal difference, 5) Matches won, 6) Goals scored
(O) Play-off winners; (R) Relegated

==== South Serie ====
Pos	Team	Pld	W	D	L	GF	GA	GD	Pts	Qualification or relegation
1	Amora	10	8	0	2	18	6	+12	29	
2	Atlético Ouriense	10	6	1	3	8	8	0	23	
3	Estoril (O)	10	5	0	5	14	12	+2	22	Advance to relegation play-offs
4	Damaiense (R)	10	5	0	5	14	12	+2	21	Advance to relegation play-offs
5	Futebol Benfica (R)	10	4	0	6	15	14	+1	15	Relegation to Campeonato Nacional II Divisão
6	A-dos-Francos (R)	10	1	1	8	7	24	−17	5	Relegation to Campeonato Nacional II Divisão

Source: FPF.pt
Rules for classification: 1) Points, 2) Head-to-head points, 3) Head-to-head goal difference, 4) Goal difference, 5) Matches won, 6) Goals scored
(O) Play-off winners; (R) Relegated

==== Relegation play-offs ====
Team 1	Agg.	Team 2	1st leg	2nd leg
Ovarense	1–2	Estoril	1–1	0–1
Damaiense	4–5	Gil Vicente	1–2	3–3
