= 2022–23 Campeonato Nacional Feminino =

38th edition of Campeonato Nacional de Futebol Feminino

Campeonato Nacional Feminino
- Season: 2022–23
- Champions: Benfica (3rd title)
- Relegated: Amora
- Champions League: Benfica
- Matches: 132
- Goals: 463 (3.51 per match)
- Top goalscorer: Cloé Lacasse (22 goals)
- Biggest home win: Benfica 9–0 Clube de Albergaria (4 February 2023)
- Biggest away win: Amora 0–8 Sporting (16 October 2022)
- Highest scoring: Benfica 9–0 Clube de Albergaria (4 February 2023); Torreense 3–6 Braga (25 March 2023)
- Longest winning run: Benfica (16 matches)
- Longest unbeaten run: Benfica (16 matches)
- Longest winless run: Amora (13 matches)
- Longest losing run: Amora (13 matches)
- Highest attendance: 27,221; Benfica 0–1 Sporting (26 March 2023)

The 2022–23 Campeonato Nacional Feminino (also known as Liga BPI for sponsorship reasons) is the 38th edition of Campeonato Nacional Feminino. Benfica is the defending champion.

Following the consecutive reduction of teams, the competition was reduced to 12 teams and played in a home-away league. This format removed the North and South series, used until the previous year.

== Teams ==
Location of teams in 2022–23 Campeonato Nacional Feminino (Mainland).
Location of teams in 2022–23 Campeonato Nacional Feminino (Madeira).

12 teams contest the Campeonato Nacional de Futebol Feminino in 2022–23.

=== Stadia and locations ===
| Team | Location | Stadium | Capacity | 2021–22 |
|---|---|---|---|---|
| Amora | Amora | Parque do Serrado | 1.000 | 1st (RP) |
| Atlético Ouriense | Ourém | Campo da Caridade | 260 | 3rd (RP) |
| Benfica | Seixal | Benfica Campus | 2,721 | 1st |
| Braga | Braga | Estádio 1º de Maio | 28,000 | 3rd |
| Clube de Albergaria | Albergaria-a-Velha | Estádio Municipal António Augusto Martins Pereira | 1,500 | 7th |
| Damaiense | Amadora | Complexo Desportivo Municipal Monte da Galega | 2,000 | 2nd (CF2) |
| Famalicão | Vila Nova de Famalicão | Academia do F.C. Famalicão | 500 | 4th |
| Länk Vilaverdense | Vila Verde | Estádio Municipal de Vila Verde | 3,000 | 8th |
| Marítimo | Funchal | Campo Adelino Rodrigues | 2,000 | 5th |
| Sporting CP | Alcochete | CGD Stadium Aurélio Pereira | 1,128 | 2nd |
| Torreense | Torres Vedras | Parque Desportivo Maximino Santos | 2,000 | 6th |
| Valadares Gaia | Vila Nova de Gaia | Complexo Desportivo Valadares | 750 | 2nd (RP) |

== League table ==
| Pos | Team | Pld | W | D | L | GF | GA | GD | Pts | Qualification or relegation |
|---|---|---|---|---|---|---|---|---|---|---|
| 1 | Benfica (C) | 22 | 21 | 0 | 1 | 99 | 7 | +92 | 63 | Qualification for the Champions League first round |
| 2 | Sporting CP | 22 | 17 | 3 | 2 | 67 | 14 | +53 | 54 | |
| 3 | Braga | 22 | 16 | 3 | 3 | 60 | 26 | +34 | 51 | |
| 4 | Famalicão | 22 | 12 | 4 | 6 | 48 | 24 | +24 | 40 | |
| 5 | Damaiense | 22 | 10 | 6 | 6 | 35 | 34 | +1 | 36 | |
| 6 | Länk Vilaverdense | 22 | 9 | 1 | 12 | 34 | 47 | −13 | 28 | |
| 7 | Torreense | 22 | 6 | 4 | 12 | 25 | 47 | −22 | 22 | |
| 8 | Clube de Albergaria | 22 | 5 | 6 | 11 | 21 | 54 | −33 | 21 | |
| 9 | Valadares Gaia | 22 | 5 | 5 | 12 | 17 | 38 | −21 | 20 | |
| 10 | Atlético Ouriense | 22 | 4 | 5 | 13 | 16 | 43 | −27 | 17 | Qualification for the Relegation play-offs |
| 11 | Marítimo | 22 | 5 | 2 | 15 | 29 | 58 | −29 | 17 | Qualification for the Relegation play-offs |
| 12 | Amora (R) | 22 | 2 | 1 | 19 | 12 | 71 | −59 | 7 | Relegation to the Campeonato Nacional II Divisão Feminino |

Source: Liga BPI
Rules for classification: 1) Points; 2) Goal difference; 3) Number of goals scored.
(C) Champions; (R) Relegated

== Relegation play-offs ==
| Team 1 | Agg. | Team 2 | 1st leg | 2nd leg |
|---|---|---|---|---|
| Atlético Ouriense | 3–2 | Gil Vicente | 2–1 | 1–1 |
| Marítimo | 6–2 | Futebol Benfica | 4–1 | 1–2 |
