= 2017–18 Campeonato Nacional Feminino =

Campeonato Nacional de Futebol Feminino
- Season: 2017–18
- Dates: 9 September 2017 – 20 May 2018
- Champions: Sporting CP; 1st title
- Relegated: Cadima; Quintajense
- Champions League: Sporting CP
- Matches: 132
- Goals: 545 (4.13 per match)
- Top goalscorer: Laura Luís (31 goals)
- Biggest home win: Braga 15–0 Quintajense (18 November 2017)
- Biggest away win: Quintajense 0–9 Braga (28 April 2018)
- Highest scoring: Braga 15–0 Quintajense (18 November 2017)
- Longest winning run: 13 matches Sporting CP
- Longest unbeaten run: 22 matches Sporting CP
- Longest winless run: 17 matches Quintajense
- Longest losing run: 13 matches Quintajense
- All statistics correct as of 31 July 2018.

The 2017–18 Campeonato Nacional de Futebol Feminino (also known as Liga de Futebol Feminino Allianz for sponsorship reasons) was the 33rd edition of Campeonato Nacional de Futebol Feminino. Sporting CP successfully defended their title, winning the competition for the 2nd time.

== Teams ==
Location of teams in 2017–18 Campeonato Nacional de Futebol Feminino

Twelve teams competed in the league – the top ten teams from the 2016–17 Campeonato Nacional, as well as two teams promoted from the Campeonato de Promoção.

As the competition was reduced from 14 to 12 teams, only two teams were promoted to replace the four teams relegated:

- Atlético Ouriense, Viseu 2001, Belenenses and Pontinha were the teams relegated, finishing 11th, 12th, 13th and 14th, respectively.
- Quintajense, the winner of the Campeonato de Promoção, and Cadima, the runner-up, were the teams promoted.

=== Stadia and locations ===
Team	Location	Stadium	Capacity
A-dos-Francos	Caldas da Rainha	Campo Municipal Quinta Boneca	2,000
A-dos-Francos	Caldas da Rainha	Campo Luís Duarte (Note: A-dos-Francos used Campo Luís Duarte on his games against Vilaverdense and Sporting CP.)	200
Boavista	Porto	Parque Desportivo de Ramalde	1,000
Boavista	Porto	Complexo Desportivo de Campanhã (Note: Boavista used Complexo Desportivo de Campanhã on his games against Clube de Albergaria, Estoril and União Ferreirense.)	1,500
Boavista	Porto	Estádio do Bessa (Note: Boavista used Estádio do Bessa on his game against Valadares.)	28,263
Braga	Braga	Estádio 1º de Maio	28,000
Braga	Braga	Campo Da Ponte (Note: Braga used Campo da Ponte on his game against A-dos-Francos)	500
Cadima	Cantanhede	Parque Desportivo do Fujanco	2,000
Clube de Albergaria	Albergaria-a-Velha	Estádio Municipal António Augusto Martins Pereira	1,500
Estoril	Estoril	Centro de Treino e Formação Desportiva	—
Futebol Benfica	Lisbon	Estádio Francisco Lázaro	1,500
Quintajense	Palmela	Campo Leonel Martins	500
Sporting CP	Alcochete	CGD Stadium Aurélio Pereira	1,128
Sporting CP	Lisbon	Estádio José Alvalade (Note: Sporting CP used Estádio José Alvalade on his games against Braga and Valadares (game of the title).)	50,095
União Ferreirense	Anadia	Complexo Desportivo da Junta de Freguesia da Moita	—
União Ferreirense	Anadia	Campo Dr. Pequito Rebelo (Note: União Ferreirense used Campo Dr. Pequito Rebelo on his game against Boavista.)	1,500
Valadares Gaia	Vila Nova de Gaia	Complexo Desportivo Valadares	750
Valadares Gaia	Vila Nova de Gaia	Estádio do C.F. Oliveira do Douro (Note: Valadares used Estádio do C.F. Oliveira do Douro on his games against Futebol Benfica and Boavista)	1,500
Vilaverdense	Vila Verde	Estádio Municipal de Vila Verde	5,000
Vilaverdense	Vila Verde	Campo da Cruz do Reguengo (Note: Vilaverdense used Campo da Cruz do Reguengo on his game against Estoril.)	5,000

=== Personnel and kits ===
Team	Manager	Kit manufacturer	Shirt sponsor (chest)
A-dos-Francos	Eduardo Manuel G. Marques Silva	Roly	Transwhite
Boavista	Pedro Ribeiro Oliveira Santos	Nike	none
Braga	Carlos Alexandre Peso Valadar	Lacatoni	none
Cadima	Carlos Filipe Rodrigues Silva	Joma	Cadimarte
Clube de Albergaria	Ana Paula Pinho Almeida	Joma	none
Estoril	João Pedro Garcia Martins	Aronick	LAIQ
Futebol Benfica	Antonio Henriques Marinho	Lacatoni	Football & Friends
Quintajense	Faisal Sulemangy Abdobakar		
Sporting CP	Nuno Preto R. Cristovao Almeida	Macron	Espaço Casa
União Ferreirense	Mario Rui Duarte Reis Martins	Adidas	Clínica do Cértoma
Valadares Gaia	Sergio Paulo Loureiro Barreto	MKA	Liberty Seguros
Vilaverdense	Jose Rui Abreu Pereira	Lacatoni	Cachapuz

== Season summary ==
=== League table ===
Pos	Team	Pld	W	D	L	GF	GA	GD	Pts	Qualification or relegation
1	Sporting CP (C)	22	20	2	0	92	5	+87	62	Qualification for UEFA Champions League qualifying round
2	Braga	22	19	2	1	126	7	+119	59	
3	Estoril	22	14	5	3	59	18	+41	47	
4	Vilaverdense	22	11	3	8	42	44	−2	36	
5	Valadares Gaia	22	10	2	10	37	41	−4	32	
6	Clube de Albergaria	22	9	4	9	35	41	−6	31	
7	Futebol Benfica	22	8	4	10	36	43	−7	28	
8	União Ferreirense (X)	22	7	4	11	27	49	−22	25	Resigned from Campeonato Nacional
9	Boavista	22	7	2	13	31	58	−27	23	
10	A-dos-Francos	22	4	3	15	28	75	−47	15 (Note: A-dos-Francos is ahead of Cadima on head-to-head goal difference: A-dos-Francos 4–1 Cadima, Cadima 2–1 A-dos-Francos)	
11	Cadima (R)	22	4	3	15	25	70	−45	15	Relegation to Campeonato Nacional II Divisão
12	Quintajense (R)	22	1	2	19	7	94	−87	5	Relegation to Campeonato Nacional II Divisão

Source: FPF
Rules for classification: 1) Points; 2) Head-to-head points; 3) Head-to-head goal difference; 4) Goal difference; 5) Matches won; 6) Goals scored; 7) Play-off.
(C) Champions; (R) Relegated; (X) Ended women's football at the end of the season

=== Results ===
Home \ Away	SPO	BRA	EST	VIL	VAL	ALB	BEN	FER	BOA	ADF	CAD	QUI
Sporting CP	—	0–0	2–0	3–2	4–1	3–0	2–0	8–0	6–0	6–0	8–1	11–0
Braga	1–2	—	4–0	6–0	6–0	5–0	5–0	5–0	9–0	13–0	7–0	15–0
Estoril	0–0	0–4	—	4–1	3–0	6–1	2–0	3–0	4–0	6–2	0–0	4–0
Vilaverdense	0–5	1–1	0–5	—	1–0	4–2	3–1	1–3	2–5	6–0	2–1	3–0
Valadares Gaia	0–2	1–4	1–5	0–2	—	1–3	2–1	2–0	2–2	2–0	3–1	3–0
Clube de Albergaria	0–4	1–2	0–2	0–2	1–1	—	3–2	0–0	2–0	3–1	2–1	3–0
Futebol Benfica	0–4	0–7	0–0	1–0	0–2	3–1	—	1–1	3–4	5–3	4–0	6–0
União Ferreirense	0–4	0–8	0–3	1–1	2–1	1–3	1–1	—	5–2	2–0	2–0	4–0
Boavista	0–4	0–1	0–3	2–5	0–1	1–3	0–1	1–0	—	1–2	3–2	1–1
A-dos-Francos	0–5	2–6	0–0	1–2	2–3	1–1	2–2	3–2	1–4	—	4–1	2–1
Cadima	0–6	0–8	3–3	3–4	1–3	1–1	1–3	2–1	1–3	2–1	—	2–1
Quintajense	0–3	0–9	0–6	0–0	1–8	0–5	0–2	0–2	0–2	2–1	1–2	—

Source: FPF
Legend: Blue = home team win; Yellow = draw; Red = away team win.
