= 2023–24 Campeonato Nacional Feminino =

39th edition of Campeonato Nacional de Futebol Feminino

Campeonato Nacional Feminino
- Season: 2023–24
- Champions: Benfica (4th title)
- Relegated: Atlético Ouriense
- Champions League: Benfica; Sporting CP
- Matches: 132
- Goals: 402 (3.05 per match)
- Top goalscorer: Kika Nazareth (17 goals)
- Biggest home win: Sporting CP 10–0 Atlético Ouriense (6 January 2024)
- Biggest away win: Marítimo 0–7 Sporting CP (27 April 2024)
- Highest scoring: Sporting CP 10–0 Atlético Ouriense (6 January 2024)
- Longest winning run: Sporting CP (8 matches)
- Longest unbeaten run: Racing Power (12 matches)
- Longest winless run: Länk Vilaverdense (14 matches)
- Longest losing run: Länk Vilaverdense (10 matches)

The 2023–24 Campeonato Nacional Feminino (also known as Liga BPI for sponsorship reasons) was the 39th edition of Campeonato Nacional Feminino. Benfica was the defending champion at the start of the season, and successfully revalidated their title with their fourth consecutive league trophy.

SL Benfica B won the Campeonato Nacional II Divisão Feminino. Because SL Benfica B and Sporting CP B, who finished 1st and 2nd respectively, are reserve teams, Estoril, who finished 3rd, was promoted.

== Teams ==
Location of teams in 2023–24 Campeonato Nacional Feminino. (Mainland)
Location of teams in 2022–23 Campeonato Nacional Feminino (Madeira).

12 teams contested the Campeonato Nacional de Futebol Feminino in 2023–24.

=== Stadia and locations ===
Team	Location	Stadium	Capacity	2022–23
Atlético Ouriense	Ourém	Campo da Caridade	260	10th
Benfica	Seixal	Benfica Campus	2,721	1st
Braga	Braga	Estádio 1º de Maio	28,000	3rd
Clube de Albergaria	Albergaria-a-Velha	Estádio Municipal António Augusto Martins Pereira	1,000	8th
Damaiense	Amadora	Complexo Desportivo Municipal Monte da Galega	2,000	5th
Famalicão	Vila Nova de Famalicão	Academia do F.C. Famalicão	500	4th
Länk Vilaverdense	Vila Verde	Estádio Municipal de Vila Verde	3,000	6th
Marítimo	Funchal	Campo Adelino Rodrigues	2,000	11th
Racing Power	Seixal	Complexo Municipal de Atletismo de Setúbal	1,500	1st (CF2)
Sporting CP	Alcochete	CGD Stadium Aurélio Pereira	1,180	2nd
Torreense	Torres Vedras	Parque Desportivo Maximino Santos	1,300	7th
Valadares Gaia	Vila Nova de Gaia	Complexo Desportivo Valadares	750	9th

== League table ==
Pos	Team	Pld	W	D	L	GF	GA	GD	Pts	Qualification or relegation
1	Benfica (C)	22	18	2	2	66	12	+54	56	Qualification for the Champions League first round - Champions Path
2	Sporting CP	22	17	3	2	68	10	+58	54	Qualification for the Champions League first round - League Path
3	Racing Power	22	13	4	5	34	13	+21	43	
4	Damaiense	22	11	4	7	31	33	−2	37	
5	Braga	22	11	3	8	47	30	+17	36	
6	Valadares Gaia	22	11	3	8	24	19	+5	36	
7	Marítimo	22	10	1	11	33	41	−8	31	
8	Torreense	22	8	6	8	33	39	−6	30	
9	Clube de Albergaria	22	5	2	15	18	51	−33	17	
10	Famalicão	22	5	1	16	18	41	−23	16	Qualification for the Relegation play-offs
11	Länk Vilaverdense	22	3	3	16	15	52	−37	12	Qualification for the Relegation play-offs
12	Atlético Ouriense (R)	22	2	4	16	15	61	−46	10	Relegation to the Campeonato Nacional II Divisão Feminino

Updated to match(es) played on 21 May 2024. Source: Liga BPI
Rules for classification: 1) Points; 2) Goal difference; 3) Number of goals scored.
(C) Champions; (R) Relegated

== Relegation play-offs ==
Team 1	Agg.	Team 2	1st leg	2nd leg
Famalicão	8–2	Vitória de Guimarães	6–1	2–1
Länk Vilaverdense	2–1	Amora	1–1	1–0
