= Ana Borges =

Portuguese footballer (born 1990)

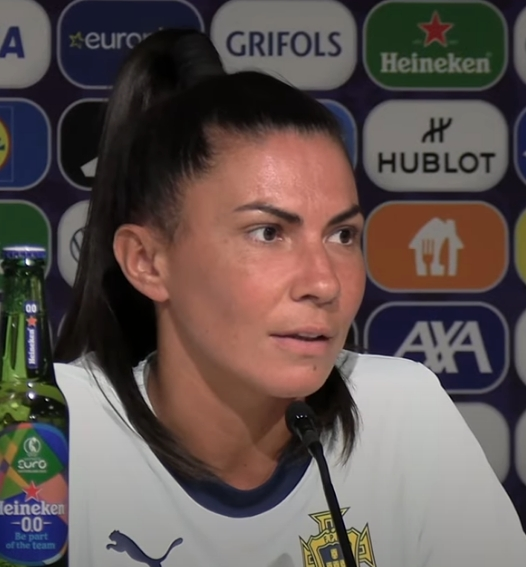
- Borges in 2025

Personal information
- Full name: Ana Catarina Marques Borges
- Date of birth: 15 June 1990 (age 36)
- Place of birth: Gouveia, Portugal
- Height: 1.55 m (5 ft 1 in)
- Positions: Forward; defender

Team information
- Current team: Benfica
- Number: 11

Youth career
- 2003–2007: Laura Santos

Senior career*
Years	Team	Apps	(Gls)
2007–2008	Laura Santos		(0)
2008–2013	Prainsa Zaragoza	130	(35)
2012–2013	Santa Clarita Blue Heat		
2013–2014	Atlético Madrid	21	(0)
2014–2017	Chelsea	35	(3)
2016–2017	→ Sporting (loan)	13	(1)
2017–2025	Sporting	139	(25)
2025–	Benfica	0	(0)

International career^{‡}
2006–2009	Portugal U19	27	(5)
2009–	Portugal	187	(11)
- * Club domestic league appearances and goals as of 10 June 2025 ‡ National team caps and goals as of 11 August 2025

Ana Catarina Marques Borges (European Portuguese pronunciation: [ˈɐnɐ ˈβɔɾʒɨʃ]; born 15 June 1990) is a Portuguese footballer who plays as a right winger or a right-back for Benfica and the Portugal women's national football team. After initially joining on loan from Chelsea, she made the move back to Portugal permanent in July 2017, just before UEFA Women's Euro 2017. She is an important member of the Portugal national team with over 110 caps.

== Club career ==
At the 2015 FA Women's Cup Final, staged at Wembley Stadium for the first time, Borges appeared as a late substitute in Chelsea's 1–0 win over Notts County. It was Chelsea's first major trophy. In October 2015 she was an unused substitute for Chelsea's 4–0 win over Sunderland, which secured the club's first FA WSL title and a League and Cup "double".

In December 2016, Borges renewed her contract with Chelsea but agreed to move on loan to Sporting CP at the same time. On being introduced to the crowd at Estádio José Alvalade, Borges vowed: "I will do everything to help Sporting, the club of my whole life."

Borges was voted the 2017–18 Campeonato Nacional de Futebol Feminino Player of the Season in June 2018.

== International career ==
Borges scored on her debut for the Portugal women's national football team on 4 March 2009, a 2–1 win over Poland at the 2009 Algarve Cup. Two days later Portugal secured another 2–1 win, this time against Wales, and Borges scored again on the occasion of her second cap. She was named by coach Francisco Neto in the 23-player Portugal squad for UEFA Women's Euro 2017 in the Netherlands.

In November 2017 she made her 100th appearance for Portugal in a 2019 FIFA Women's World Cup qualification fixture against Moldova.

On 30 May 2023, she was included in the 23-player squad for the 2023 FIFA Women's World Cup.

On 24 June 2025, Borges was called up to the Portugal squad for the UEFA Women's Euro 2025.

== Honours ==
Sporting

- Campeonato Nacional Feminino: 2016–17, 2017–18
- Taça de Portugal: 2016–17, 2017–18, 2021–22
- Supertaça de Portugal: 2017, 2021, 2024

Chelsea

- FA WSL: 2015
- FA Women's Cup: 2014–15

Individual

- Campeonato Nacional Feminino Player of the Year: 2017–18
