= Jamila Marreiros =

Portuguese footballer

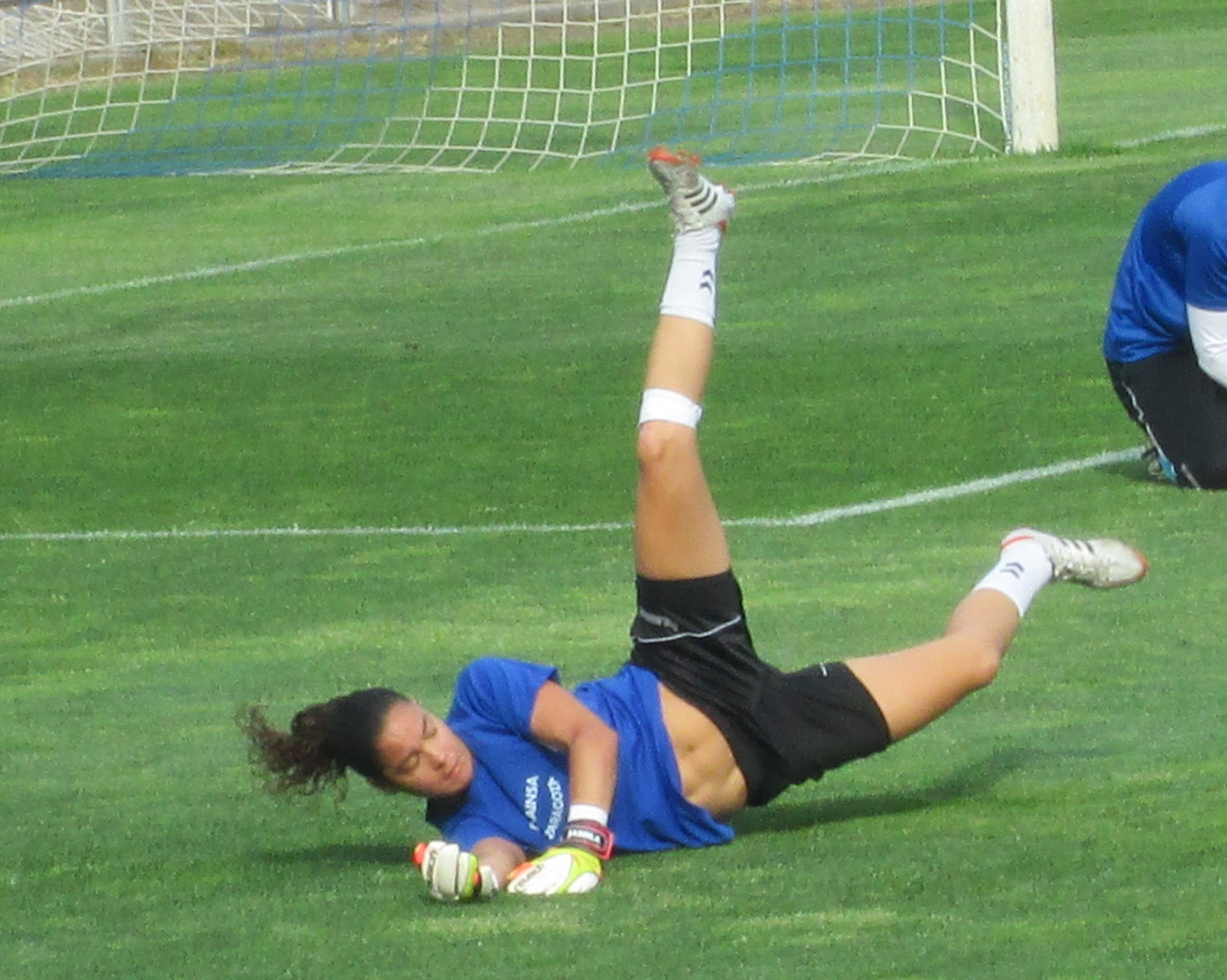

Personal information
- Full name: Jamila Soraia Martins Marreiros
- Date of birth: 30 May 1988 (age 38)
- Place of birth: Lagos, Portugal
- Height: 1.67 m (5 ft 6 in)
- Position: Goalkeeper

Team information
- Current team: CF Benfica
- Number: 1

Senior career*
Years	Team	Apps	(Gls)
	União de Lagos	0	(0)
2009–2013	Prainsa Zaragoza	71	(0)
2013–2014	RCD Espanyol	26	(0)
2014–2015	A-dos-Francos	0	(0)
2015–	CF Benfica	0	(0)

International career^{‡}
2009–	Portugal	12	(0)
- * Club domestic league appearances and goals as of 18 November 2017 ‡ National team caps and goals as of 18 November 2017

Jamila Soraia Martins Marreiros (born 30 May 1988) is a Portuguese football goalkeeper who plays for CF Benfica and the Portugal women's national football team.

== Club career ==
Marreiros is the daughter of a Portuguese father and Angolan mother. She grew up playing futsal for União de Lagos alongside team-mate Cláudia Neto. After switching to 11-a-side, she later played alongside Neto at Spanish Primera División clubs Prainsa Zaragoza and RCD Espanyol. Both players were allowed to leave Espanyol in June 2014.

She returned to Portugal and played for A-dos-Francos in 2014–15. In season 2015–16 CF Benfica secured their second consecutive League and Cup double and their goalkeeper Marreiros was named Campeonato Nacional de Futebol Feminino Goalkeeper of the Year.

== International career ==
Marreiros was named by coach Francisco Neto in the Portugal national team for UEFA Women's Euro 2017, where she understudied Patrícia Morais.
