= 2018–19 Campeonato Nacional Feminino =

34th edition of Campeonato Nacional de Futebol Feminino

Campeonato Nacional de Futebol Feminino
- Season: 2018–19
- Dates: 16 September 2018 – 12 May 2019
- Champions: Braga; 1st title
- Relegated: Vilaverdense; Boavista
- Champions League: Braga
- Matches: 132
- Goals: 505 (3.83 per match)
- Top goalscorer: Vanessa Marques (29 goals)
- All statistics correct as of 13 May 2019.

The 2018–19 Campeonato Nacional de Futebol Feminino (also known as Liga BPI for sponsorship reasons) was the 34th edition of Campeonato Nacional de Futebol Feminino. SC Braga won the title for the first time.

== Teams ==
Location of teams in 2018–19 Campeonato Nacional de Futebol Feminino (Mainland)
Location of teams in 2018–19 Campeonato Nacional de Futebol Feminino (Madeira)

Twelve teams will compete in the league – nine teams from the 2017–18 Campeonato Nacional, as well as three teams promoted from the Campeonato de Promoção.

The team changes were the following:

- Cadima and Quintajense were the teams relegated, finishing 11th and 12th, respectively.
- Marítimo, the winner of Campeonato de Promoção and Ovarense, the runner-up, were the teams promoted.
- After finishing 8th, União Ferreirense ended women's football because of problems in the direction and was replaced by Atlético Ouriense, the 3rd placed team of Campeonato de Promoção along with Braga B, which is a reserve team and can't be promoted.

=== Stadia and locations ===
Team	Location	Stadium	Capacity
A-dos-Francos	Caldas da Rainha	Campo Municipal Quinta Boneca	2,000
Atlético Ouriense	Ourém	Campo da Caridade	260
Boavista	Porto	Parque Desportivo de Ramalde	1,000
Braga	Braga	Estádio 1º de Maio	28,000
Clube de Albergaria	Albergaria-a-Velha	Estádio Municipal António Augusto Martins Pereira	1,500
Estoril	Estoril	Centro de Treino e Formação Desportiva	—
Futebol Benfica	Lisbon	Estádio Francisco Lázaro	1,500
Marítimo	Funchal	Campo Complexo Desportivo C.F. Andorinha	500
Ovarense	Ovar	Estádio Marques Silva	3,200
Sporting CP	Alcochete	CGD Stadium Aurélio Pereira	1,128
Valadares Gaia	Vila Nova de Gaia	Complexo Desportivo Valadares	750
Vilaverdense	Vila Verde	Estádio Municipal de Vila Verde	5,000

== Season summary ==
=== League table ===
Pos	Team	Pld	W	D	L	GF	GA	GD	Pts	Qualification or relegation
1	Braga (C)	22	20	2	0	108	6	+102	62	Qualification for UEFA Champions League qualifying round
2	Sporting CP	22	19	2	1	76	4	+72	59	
3	Futebol Benfica	22	15	2	5	46	23	+23	47	
4	Estoril	22	12	3	7	55	38	+17	39	
5	Clube de Albergaria	22	10	5	7	31	33	−2	35	
6	Marítimo	22	8	5	9	35	40	−5	29	
7	Atlético Ouriense	22	8	2	12	34	51	−17	26	
8	Valadares Gaia	22	8	5	9	42	39	+3	29	
9	A-dos-Francos	22	7	1	14	24	54	−30	22	
10	Ovarense	22	4	2	16	29	60	−31	14	
11	Vilaverdense (R)	22	3	2	17	8	73	−65	11	Relegation to Campeonato Nacional II Divisão
12	Boavista (R)	22	1	3	18	17	84	−67	6	Relegation to Campeonato Nacional II Divisão

Updated to match(es) played on 11 May 2019. Source: FPF
Rules for classification: 1) Points; 2) Head-to-head points; 3) Head-to-head goal difference; 4) Goal difference; 5) Matches won; 6) Goals scored; 7) Play-off.
(C) Champions; (R) Relegated

=== Results ===
Home \ Away	ADF	OUR	BOA	BRA	ALB	EST	BEN	MAR	OVA	SPO	VAL	VIL
A-dos-Francos	—	1–2	2–3	1–6	0–2	1–7	1–3	0–1	3–0	0–4	0–0	3–0
Atlético Ouriense	1–3	—	4–2	0–6	1–1	0–1	0–4	1–4	1–2	0–6	2–0	5–0
Boavista	1–2	1–6	—	0–8	0–2	1–4	1–4	0–3	2–4	0–2	2–2	1–2
Braga	4–0	5–1	9–0	—	9–0	1–1	3–0	7–0	4–0	0–0	10–1	7–0
Clube de Albergaria	3–0	0–1	0–0	0–5	—	1–1	1–2	4–1	3–2	0–2	0–3	2–0
Estoril	3–0	3–2	7–0	0–6	0–2	—	0–1	3–1	4–3	0–1	3–8	5–0
Futebol Benfica	3–1	2–1	0–0	0–1	0–1	4–2	—	1–0	2–1	0–1	2–1	3–0
Marítimo	1–0	2–2	6–1	1–4	2–2	0–1	3–4	—	2–2	1–1	3–0	1–2
Ovarense	1–2	0–1	1–0	1–4	2–4	0–0	2–6	2–3	—	0–6	1–2	5–0
Sporting CP	8–0	3–0	3–0	0–2	1–0	3–0	2–1	4–0	7–0	—	2–0	11–0
Valadares Gaia	0–1	4–1	8–0	0–2	1–0	3–6	1–1	3–0	3–0	0–2	—	0–0
Vilaverdense	1–3	1–2	1–1	0–5	0–2	0–4	0–3	0–1	1–0	0–7	0–2	—

Updated to match(es) played on 11 May 2019. Source: FPF
Legend: Blue = home team win; Yellow = draw; Red = away team win.
