= Campeonato Nacional III Divisão Feminino =

Portuguese women's association football league

- Organising body: Portuguese Football Federation (FPF)
- Founded: 2020; 6 years ago
- Country: Portugal
- Number of clubs: 60
- Level on pyramid: 3
- Promotion to: Campeonato Nacional II Divisão
- Relegation to: Campeonato Nacional IV Divisão
- Domestic cup: Taça de Portugal
- Current champions: Real SC (1st title) (2025–26)
- Website: FPF.pt
- Current: 2025–26

The Campeonato Nacional III Divisão de Futebol Feminino is the third-highest division of the Portuguese women's football league system. It is run by the Portuguese Football Federation and began in 2008. The current champions are Real SC, who won their first title in 2026.

== Competition ==
After some years of supporting women football, many teams were formed and supported by FPF. In order to have a more competitive level before the first division, the number of teams of the second division was reduced and the third division was formed. The inaugural season was in 2021-22.

== List of champions ==
Season	Champions	2nd place
National Championship 3ª Division
2020–21	Racing Power	Rio Ave
2021–22	Braga B	Famalicão B
2022–23	Vitória FC	Tirsense
2023–24	Rio Ave	Guia FC
2024–25	FC Porto	Real SC
2025–26	Real SC	
