= Taça de Portugal Feminina =

- Founded: 2003
- Region: Portugal
- Teams: 40
- Current champions: S.L. Benfica (3rd title)
- Most championships: 1º de Dezembro (7 titles)
- Broadcaster: RTP1
- Website: Official site
- 2025-26

The Taça de Portugal Feminina (lit. 'Women's Taça de Portugal') is an annual association football competition and the premier knockout tournament in Portuguese female football. It was founded in 2003. For sponsorship reasons, it has been known as Taça de Portugal Feminina Allianz. It is disputed from the clubs from the Campeonato Nacional Feminino and the Campeonato Nacional II Divisão Feminino.

The winners dispute the Supertaça de Futebol Feminino against the first league winners.

1º de Dezembro were the first winners, in the 2003–04 season, and hold the record of most wins (7). S.L. Benfica are the current holders (3rd title) after beating FC Porto 2–0 in the 2026 final.

== List of finals ==
The following is a list of all finals so far.

List of finals matches, their venues and locations, the finalists, and final scores
Year	Winners	Score	Runners-up	Venue	Attendance	References
2003–04	1º de Dezembro	6–0	Marítimo Murtoense	Abrantes		
2004–05	Marítimo Murtoense	3–2	Várzea	Pedroso		
2005–06	1º de Dezembro	3–1	Marítimo Murtoense	Fátima		
2006–07	1º de Dezembro	5–0	Boavista	Pombal		
2007–08	1º de Dezembro	6–0	Clube de Albergaria	Nazaré		
2008–09	Escola	1–1 (6–5 pen.)	Boavista	Parque de Jogos de Cujães, Oliveira de Azeméis		
2009–10	1º de Dezembro	6–0	Boavista	Estádio Nacional, Jamor	3,500	
2010–11	1º de Dezembro	3–0	Futebol Benfica	Estádio Nacional, Jamor		
2011–12	1º de Dezembro	4–0	Clube de Albergaria	Estádio Nacional, Jamor	4,000	
2012–13	Boavista	3–1	Valadares Gaia	Estádio Nacional, Jamor	850	
2013–14	Atlético Ouriense	1–0	C.F. Benfica	Estádio Nacional, Jamor		
2014–15	C.F. Benfica	1–0	Clube de Albergaria	Estádio Nacional, Jamor		
2015–16	C.F. Benfica	2–1	Valadares Gaia	Estádio Nacional, Jamor		
2016–17	Sporting CP	1–1 (2–1 (a.e.t.)))	Braga	Estádio Nacional, Jamor	12,213	
2017–18	Sporting CP	0–0 (1–0 (a.e.t.))	Braga	Estádio Nacional, Jamor	11,714	
2018–19	S.L. Benfica	4–0	Valadares Gaia	Estádio Nacional, Jamor	12,632	
2019–20	Braga	3–1	S.L. Benfica	Estádio Municipal de Aveiro, Aveiro	0	
2020–21	Abandoned due to the COVID-19 pandemic in Portugal					
2021–22	Sporting CP	2–1	Famalicão	Estádio Nacional, Jamor	13,894	
2022–23	Famalicão	2–0	Braga	Estádio Nacional, Jamor		
2023–24	S.L. Benfica	4–1	Racing Power	Estádio Nacional, Jamor	18,124	
2024–25	Torreense	1–1 (2–1 (a.e.t.))	S.L. Benfica	Estádio Nacional, Jamor		
2025–26	S.L. Benfica	2—0	FC Porto	Estádio Nacional, Jamor	22,258	

=== Performance by club ===
Club	Winners	Runners-up	Winning years	Runner-up years
1º de Dezembro	7	0	2004, 2006, 2007, 2008, 2010, 2011, 2012	–
S.L. Benfica	3	2	2019, 2024, 2026	2020, 2025
Sporting CP	3	0	2017, 2018, 2022	–
C.F. Benfica	2	2	2015, 2016	2011, 2014
Boavista	1	3	2013	2007, 2009, 2010
Marítimo Murtoense	1	2	2005	2004, 2006
Braga	1	3	2020	2017, 2018, 2023
Famalicão	1	1	2023	2022
Escola	1	0	2009	–
Atlético Ouriense	1	0	2014	–
Torreense	1	0	2025	–
Clube de Albergaria	0	3	–	2008, 2012, 2015
Valadares Gaia	0	3	–	2013, 2016, 2019
Várzea	0	1	–	2005
Racing Power	0	1	–	2024
FC Porto	0	1	–	2026
