= Supertaça de Portugal Feminina =

- Organiser(s): FPF
- Founded: 2015; 11 years ago
- Region: Portugal
- Teams: 2 (formerly 4, from 2022 to 2024, and 2, from 2015 to 2021)
- Current champions: SL Benfica (4th title)
- Most championships: SL Benfica (4 titles)
- Broadcaster(s): RTP, TVI
- Website: https://www.fpf.pt
- 2026

The Supertaça de Portugal Feminina (English: Portuguese Women's Super Cup) is an annual Portuguese football tournament played since 2015.

Originally, the Super Cup was played between the winners of the Portuguese league, Campeonato Nacional Feminino, and the holders of the Portuguese Cup, Taça de Portugal Feminina. If the League champions also won the Cup (i.e. achieve the double, Portuguese: dobradinha), they would play against the Cup runners-up.

The first edition of the Super Cup, played in August 2015 in this two-team format, saw Futebol Benfica beat Clube de Albergaria 4–0.

In 2022, the FPF announced the Supercup would be extended to include the League's runner-ups and the League Cup's winners, bringing it up to a four-team format. If any team would take more than one spot (for example, by winning both the league and league cup, or winning the cup and finishing second in the league), the remaining spots were to be awarded to the League's 3rd and/or 4th finishers of the previous season. This was the case in 2024, following SL Benfica's success in the 2023/2024 editions of the League, the Cup, and the League Cup, granting third-place finshers Racing Power and fourth-place finishers Damaiense a spot in the Super Cup.

In 2024, Sporting CP won the Super Cup after qualifying through a second-place league finish in the 2023–24 season. This marked the first time in Portuguese football history (male or female) where a team won the Super Cup without winning neither the League or the Cup, nor at least reaching the Cup final (in case of a domestic double).

On February 4th, 2025, FPF once again changed the format of the competition, reverting it back to the two-team format used before 2022.

== Editions ==
Edition	Year	Winners	Score	Runners-up	Date	Venue		
1st	2015	Futebol Benfica	4–0	Clube de Albergaria ‡	29 August 2015	Estádio Municipal de Abrantes, Abrantes		
2nd	2016	Valadares Gaia ‡	1–0	Futebol Benfica	3 September 2016	Estádio Municipal da Marinha Grande, Marinha Grande		
3rd	2017	Sporting	3–1 (a.e.t.)	Braga ‡	3 September 2017	Estádio Cidade de Coimbra, Coimbra		
4th	2018	Braga ‡	1–1 (5–4 pen.)	Sporting	9 September 2018	Estádio do Fontelo, Viseu		
5th	2019	SL Benfica	1–0	Braga	8 September 2019	Estádio João Cardoso, Tondela		
–	2020	Cancelled due to the COVID-19 pandemic in Portugal						
6th	2021	Sporting	2–0	SL Benfica	28 August 2021	Estádio do Restelo, Lisbon		
Four-team format
Edition	Year	Winners	Score	Runners-up	Date	Venue	Third Place	Fourth Place
7th	2022	SL Benfica	4–1 (a.e.t.)	Sporting	26 August 2022	Estádio Dr. Magalhães Pessoa, Leiria	Braga	Famalicão ‡
8th	2023	SL Benfica	1–1 (3–0 pen.)	Sporting	13 September 2023	Estádio Dr. Magalhães Pessoa, Leiria	Braga ‡	Famalicão
9th	2024	Sporting	2-1	SL Benfica	23 August 2024	Estádio do Restelo, Lisbon	Damaiense	Racing Power ‡
Two-team format
Edition	Year	Winners	Score	Runners-up	Date	Venue		
10th	2025	Torreense	2-1	SL Benfica	7 September 2025	Estádio António Coimbra da Mota, Lisbon		
11th	2026	SL Benfica	5-1	FC Porto ‡	6 September 2026	Estádio Municipal do Fontelo, Viseu		

Champions
Cup representatives
‡ Cup runners-up

Note: teams with an ‡ played the Super Cup as losing Cup finalists, since their opponents had won both the Championship and the Cup in the same year (that is, made the double).

== Performance by club ==
Club	Winners	Runners-up	Winning years	Runner-up years
SL Benfica	4	3	2019, 2022, 2023, 2026	2021, 2024, 2025
Sporting CP	3	3	2017, 2021, 2024	2018, 2022, 2023
Braga	1	2	2018	2017, 2019
Futebol Benfica	1	1	2015	2016
Valadares Gaia	1	0	2016	–
Torreense	1	0	2025	–
Clube de Albergaria	0	1	–	2015
FC Porto	0	1	–	2026

== See also ==
- List of association football competitions#Portugal
