= Campeonato Nacional II Divisão Feminino =

Portuguese women's association football league

- Organising body: Portuguese Football Federation (FPF)
- Founded: 2005; 21 years ago
- Country: Portugal
- Number of clubs: 20
- Level on pyramid: 2
- Promotion to: Campeonato Nacional
- Relegation to: Campeonato Nacional III
- Domestic cup: Taça de Portugal
- Current champions: FC Porto (1st title) (2025–26)
- Most championships: Odivelas F.C. (2 titles)
- Website: FPF.pt
- Current: 2025–26

The Campeonato Nacional II Divisão de Futebol Feminino (Portuguese for National Championship II division of Women's Football) is the second-highest division of the Portuguese women's football league system, after the Campeonato Nacional Feminino. It is run by the Portuguese Football Federation and began in 2008.

== Competition ==
As of 2017–18 there were 56 clubs in the Campeonato Promoção. During the first phase, clubs are divided into seven regionalised groups (Séries A–F and a four-club Série Madeira). The second phase comprises two groups of four teams (Série Norte and Série Sul). Each club plays the others twice (a double round-robin system), once at their home stadium and once at that of their opponents', for six games. Teams receive three points for a win and one point for a draw. No points are awarded for a loss. Teams are ranked by total points, then head-to-head points, head-to-head goal difference, goal difference, matches won, and goals scored. The group winners are promoted to the following season's Campeonato Nacional and meet in a two-legged Final phase to establish the champion.

After the creation of a third division whose inaugural season was 2020-21, the number of teams competing was reduced to 20 by 2021-22. In this format, the clubs were divided in only two series (north and South), with the best placed teams playing a subsequent phase to determine the champion.

== History ==
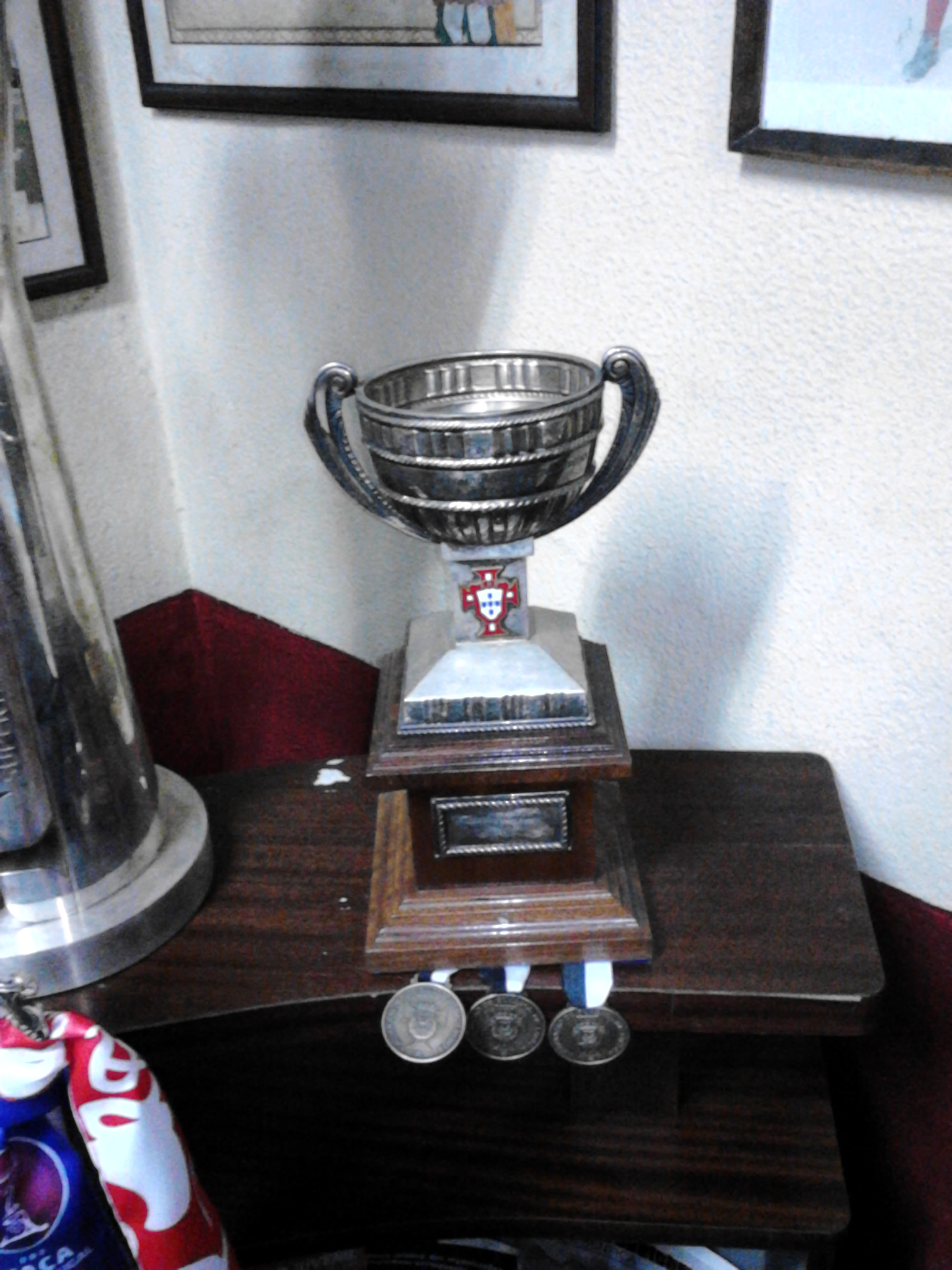
The Trophy

In 2008–09, coach Helena Costa steered Odivelas F.C. to the inaugural championship title. In September 2018 Benfica made their debut in the competition and beat U.D. Ponte de Frielas 28–0. The result established a new record winning margin in Portuguese senior football, beating Sporting CP's 21–0 win over Mindelense in 1971.

== List of champions ==
Season	Champions	2nd place
Campeonato Nacional 2ª Divisão
2005–06	Fonte Boa	
2006–07	Odivelas	
2007–08	Beira Mar Almada	
2008–09	Odivelas	Cadima
2009–10	Futebol Benfica	Vilaverdense
2010–11	Casa do Povo de Martim	Escola de Futebol Feminino de Setúbal
Campeonato Nacional de Promoção
2011–12	C.A. Ouriense	Fundacão Laura Santos
2012–13	A-dos-Francos	Valadares Gaia
2013–14	Leixões	Fundacão Laura Santos
2014–15	Viseu 2001	Cadima
2015–16	CAC Pontinha	União Ferreirense
2016–17	Quintajense	Cadima
2017–18	Marítimo	Ovarense
Campeonato Nacional II Divisão
2018–19	SL Benfica	Braga B
2019–20	Abandoned due to the COVID-19 pandemic in Portugal	
2020–21	Sporting CP B	Länk Vilaverdense
2021–22	Damaiense	Futebol Benfica
2022–23	Racing Power	SL Benfica B
2023–24	SL Benfica B	Sporting CP B
2024–25	Vitória SC	SL Benfica B
2025–26	FC Porto	
