= C.F. Benfica (women) =

Portuguese women's football team

Futebol Benfica
- Full name: Clube Futebol Benfica
- Nickname: Fofó
- Ground: Estádio Francisco Lázaro, Benfica, Lisbon, Portugal
- Capacity: 1,500
- President: Domingos Estanislau
- Manager: Madalena Gala
- League: Campeonato Nacional
- 2018–19: 3rd of 12
- Website: https://pt-pt.facebook.com/pages/Clube-Futebol-Benfica-Feminino/280773818636523
Home colours	Away colours

Clube de Futebol Benfica, commonly known as Futebol Benfica or simply as Fofó, is a Portuguese women's football team from Lisbon. It is the women's section of C.F. Benfica.

== History ==
Futebol Benfica already played in the top Portuguese level in the 1990s. In the 2010–11 season it returned to the category. Though that same season it reached the Cup final, initially it struggled to avoid relegation. But in the 2013–14 season Futebol Benfica rose to the top positions. The next year, 2014–15, Futebol Benfica won both the championship and the cup. Futebol Benfica repeated the feat in 2015–16, winning both the championship and cup again.

In the 2015–16 season Futebol Benfica made its Champions League debut. Despite winning two out of its three games, Futebol Benfica was eliminated in the qualifying round.

== Honours ==
- Campeonato Nacional

Winners (2): 2014–15, 2015–16

- Taça de Portugal

Winners (2): 2014–15, 2015–16

- Supertaça de Portugal

Winners (1): 2015

- Campeonato Nacional II Divisão

Winners (1): 2009–10

== Current squad ==
As of 4 October 2022.

Note: Flags indicate national team as defined under FIFA eligibility rules; some limited exceptions apply. Players may hold more than one non-FIFA nationality.

No.	Pos.	Nation	Player
1	GK	POR	Jamila Marreiros
2	DF	POR	Sara Ribeiro
6	DF	POR	Sofia Nunes
7	MF	POR	Sílvia Brunheira
8	MF	POR	Catarina Realista
9	MF	POR	Andreia Silvia
10	FW	POR	Filipa Galvão
11	MF	POR	Andreia Veiga
13	MF	POR	Maria Baleia
15	DF	POR	Carla Silva
16	FW	POR	Mafalda Marujo
18	DF	POR	Ana Teixeira

No.	Pos.	Nation	Player
20	FW	POR	Mariana Coelho
21	FW	POR	Andreia Marques
22	FW	POR	Joana Flores
23	MF	POR	Ana Bral
—	GK	POR	Inês Andrada
—	GK	POR	Sara Machado
—	DF	POR	Maria Inês
—	MF	POR	Carla Cardoso
—	MF	POR	Daniela Veloso
—	FW	POR	Adriana Afonso
—	FW	POR	Joana Vieira
