= G.D.C. A-dos-Francos =

Portuguese sports club

GDC A-dos-Francos
- Full name: Grupo Desportivo Cultural A-dos-Francos
- Founded: 1976
- Ground: Campo Luis Duarte
- Capacity: 1,000
- Manager: (Portugal) Renato Fernades
- League: Campeonato Nacional de Futebol Feminino
- 2018-19: 9th

Grupo Desportivo Cultural A-dos-Francos is a Portuguese women's football club based in A dos Francos, freguesia in the municipality of Caldas da Rainha (Centro Region, Portugal)-

== Current squad ==
As of 8 May 2020.

Note: Flags indicate national team as defined under FIFA eligibility rules; some limited exceptions apply. Players may hold more than one non-FIFA nationality.

No.	Pos.	Nation	Player
19	MF	MDA	Anastasia Sivolobova
—	GK	POR	Mariana Ferreira
—	GK	POR	Bárbara Santos
—	GK	POR	Joana Silva
—	DF	POR	Denise Ferreira
—	DF	POR	Carolina Silva
—	DF	POR	Sofia Silva
—	MF	POR	Tatiana Costa
—	MF	POR	Carolina Ferreira
—	MF	POR	Filipa Francisco
—	MF	POR	Cristiana Garia
—	MF	POR	Luciana García

No.	Pos.	Nation	Player
—	MF	POR	Maria Jesus
—	MF	POR	Jéssica Pacheco
—	MF	POR	Milene Ramos
—	MF	POR	Bárbara Reis
—	FW	POR	Ana Batista
—	FW	POR	Ana Dias
—	FW	POR	Telma Fernandes
—	FW	POR	Lara Matos
—	FW	POR	Ian Moirinho
—	FW	POR	Catarina Sousa
—	FW	POR	Cláudia Tecedeiro

== Titles ==
=== Official ===
- Campeonato Nacional II Divisão

Winners: 2012–13

- Taça Promoção Feminino

Winners: 2009–10, 2011–12
