= Vilaverdense F.C. (women) =

Portuguese football club

Vilaverdense
- Full name: Vilaverdense Futebol Clube
- Founded: 2008; 18 years ago
- Ground: Estádio Municipal de Vila Verde; Vila Verde, Portugal
- Capacity: 3,000
- Chairman: Isidro Fernandes
- Head Coach: Carlos Valadar
- League: Campeonato Nacional de Futebol Feminino
- 2023-24: 11th

Vilaverdense Futebol Clube, formerly known as Länk Vilaverdense, is a Portuguese women's football club based in Vila Verde. The team plays in Portugal's top-division league, Campeonato Nacional de Futebol Feminino.

It's part of the Portuguese club Vilaverdense F.C., which also operates a men's team.

== Current squad ==
Note: Flags indicate national team as defined under FIFA eligibility rules; some limited exceptions apply. Players may hold more than one non-FIFA nationality.

No.	Pos.	Nation	Player
1	GK	BRA	Letícia Rodrigues
4	MF	POR	Ana Carolina Sá
6	DF	POR	Cláudia Machado (captain)
7	MF	USA	Selena Barnett
8	DF	ESP	Laura Navajas
10	MF	POR	Margarida Oliveira
12	DF	MEX	Estefanía Fuentes
15	MF	BRA	Joyce Silva
17	MF	POR	Fáti Sousa

No.	Pos.	Nation	Player
20	MF	POR	Matilde Pereira
21	MF	POR	Ema Cruz
25	FW	POR	Eduarda Rodrigues
27	MF	POR	Iara Ribeiro
42	FW	POR	Maria Ribeiro
77	GK	POR	Sofia Bernardo
80	FW	POR	Francisca Veiga
87	DF	POR	Constança Fernandes
97	MF	BRA	Pâmela Dutra
99	FW	POR	Mara Gonçalves
