= Clube de Albergaria =

Portuguese women's football team

- Full name: Clube de Albergaria
- Ground: Estádio do Mergulhão Oliveira de Azeméis
- Chairman: (Portugal) José Oliveira
- Manager: (Portugal) Nuno Amieiro
- League: Campeonato Nacional Feminino
- 2024–25: 11th
- Website: http://www.clubedealbergaria.pt/

Clube de Albergaria is a Portuguese women's football team from Albergaria-a-Velha (Aveiro District).

== Current squad ==
As of 14 September 2024.

- Note: Flags indicate national team as defined under FIFA eligibility rules. Players may hold more than one non-FIFA.

Goalkeepers	Defenders	Midfielders	Forwards
(Portugal) Sabrina Araújo (Portugal) Leonor Martins (Portugal) Luísa Pinheiro	(Portugal) Luana Doce (Portugal) Marta Galvão (Portugal) Mariana Couto (Germany) Paula Ruess (Portugal) Beatriz Oliveira (Portugal) Matilde Róias (Portugal) Carolina Ferreira	(Kosovo) Blerta Smaili (Canada) Karima Lemire (Belarus) Anna Bysik (Portugal) Beatriz Rocha (Portugal) Luana Barata (Portugal) Maria Carolina (Portugal) Kiki (Portugal) Ana Filipa Rodrigues (Haiti) Anyssa Ibrahim (Portugal) Maria Rodrigues	(Portugal) Andreia Freitas (Portugal) Cristiana Martins (Portugal) Sara Lemos (Portugal) Rita Montenegro (United States) Lacee Bethea (Portugal) Laura Luís (Portugal) Alexandra Henriques (Portugal) Cheila Nolasco (Portugal) Ana Alves
