= Atlético Ouriense =

Women's football club from Ourém, Portugal

- Full name: Clube Atlético Ouriense
- Founded: 1949
- Ground: Campo da Caridade
- Capacity: 5,000
- Chairman: (Portugal) João Sousa
- Manager: (Portugal) Carlos Ribeiro
- League: Campeonato Nacional de Futebol Feminino
- 2023–24: 12th
- Website: http://ouriensefutebolfeminino.blogspot.pt/
Home colours	Away colours

Clube Atlético Ouriense is a women's football club from Ourém, Portugal. The team was promoted to the national top division in 2011–12. In its first year in the Campeonato Nacional de Futebol Feminino it won the championship outright, ending an eleven-year title sequence by S.U. 1º de Dezembro. The team defended the title in 2014. In August 2014, Atlético Ouriense became the first Portuguese women's football club to qualify to the UEFA Women's Champions League knock-out stage.

== Current squad ==
As of 24 September 2023.

Note: Flags indicate national team as defined under FIFA eligibility rules; some limited exceptions apply. Players may hold more than one non-FIFA nationality.

No.	Pos.	Nation	Player
7	MF	(Portugal) POR	Jéssica Pastilha
11	MF	(Portugal) POR	Anita Santos
17	FW	(Portugal) POR	Flávia Fartaria
18	DF	(Portugal) POR	Ana Valinho
20	DF	(Portugal) POR	Catarina Rodrigues
22	GK	(Portugal) POR	Daniela Pereia
30	GK	(Portugal) POR	Bárbara Santos
66	MF	(Portugal) POR	Cristina Pastilha

No.	Pos.	Nation	Player
71	MF	(Portugal) POR	Bárbara Pragana
—	MF	(Portugal) POR	Mafalda Baptista
—	MF	(Portugal) POR	Ana Cláudia Neves
—	FW	(Australia) AUS	Tiffany Eliadis
—	DF	(Portugal) POR	Anaís Oliveira
—	FW	(Portugal) POR	Patrícia Teixeira
—	DF	(Portugal) POR	Ana Tomaz

== Titles ==
- Campeonato Nacional de Futebol Feminino
  - Champions (2): 2012–13, 2013–14

== UEFA Competition Record ==
Season	Competition	Stage	Result	Opponent
2013–14	Champions League	Qualifying Stage	0–5	(Switzerland) Zürich
2013–14	Champions League	Qualifying Stage	2–1	(Faroe Islands) KÍ Klaksvík
2013–14	Champions League	Qualifying Stage	1–1	(Montenegro) Ekonomist
2014–15	Champions League	Qualifying Stage	1–0	(Belgium) Standard Liège
2014–15	Champions League	Qualifying Stage	2–1	(Israel) ASA Tel Aviv
2014–15	Champions League	Qualifying Stage	1–2	(Wales) Cardiff Met.
2014–15	Champions League	Round of 32	0–3 0–6	(Denmark) Fortuna Hjørring
