= Valadares Gaia F.C. =

Portuguese football club

Valadares Gaia
- Full name: Valadares Gaia Futebol Clube
- Founded: 17 June 2011; 14 years ago
- Ground: Complexo Desportivo de Valadares; Valadares (Vila Nova de Gaia)
- Chairman: José Manuel Soares
- Head Coach: Fernando Matos
- League: Campeonato Nacional de Futebol Feminino
- 2025–26: 4th
- Website: http://valadaresgaia.com/
Home colours

Valadares Gaia Futebol Clube is a Portuguese women's football club based in Valadares, Vila Nova de Gaia.

== Current squad ==
As of 17 May 2025

Note: Flags indicate national team as defined under FIFA eligibility rules; some limited exceptions apply. Players may hold more than one non-FIFA nationality.

No.	Pos.	Nation	Player
1	GK	POR	Carol Alves
2	DF	USA	Mackenzie Cherry
4	DF	GHA	Louisa Aniwaa
6	MF	POR	Margarida Pinto
7	MF	ENG	Erica Parkinson
8	MF	GER	Emily Hähnel
9	FW	USA	Jennie Lakip
11	FW	POR	Carolina Santiago
13	FW	USA	McKenna Martinez
14	MF	POR	Angeline da Costa
16	FW	POR	Neuza Besugo
17	MF	POR	Ana Carolina Ferreira

No.	Pos.	Nation	Player
18	DF	POR	Maria Baleia
19	FW	POR	Margarida Teixeira
22	DF	POR	Sara Monteiro (Captain)
23	MF	USA	Alexis Strickland
25	MF	POR	Cristiana Vieira
27	DF	POR	Inês Barge
31	GK	USA	Erin Seppi
33	GK	ESP	María Ortiz
77	MF	POR	Matilde Silva
78	DF	POR	Beatriz Barbosa
88	MF	POR	Érica Ventura
—	MF	USA	Gabby Dellocono

== Honours ==
- Supertaça de Portugal de Futebol Feminino
  - Champions: 2015–16
