= 2026–27 Campeonato Nacional Feminino =

Portuguese women's football league season

Campeonato Nacional Feminino
- Season: 2026–27
- Dates: 12 September 2026 – 23 May 2027
- Matches: 29
- Goals: 77 (2.66 per match)
- Top goalscorer: Telma Encarnação (5 goals)
- Best goalkeeper: Lena Pauels (4 clean sheets)
- Biggest home win: Torreense 8–0 Marítimo; 27 September 2026
- Biggest away win: Marítimo 0–4 Benfica; 18 October 2026
- Highest scoring: Torreense 8–0 Marítimo; 27 September 2026
- Longest winning run: 5 games Benfica
- Longest unbeaten run: 6 games Porto
- Longest winless run: 6 games Marítimo; Rio Ave
- Longest losing run: 6 games Marítimo
- All statistics correct as of 3 November 2026.

The 2026–27 Campeonato Nacional Femenino, known as the 2026–27 Liga BPI for sponsorship reasons, is the 42nd season of the Campeonato Nacional Feminino (Liga BPI), the top division of women's football in Portugal. The season began on 12 September 2026 and will conclude on 23 May 2027.

Benfica are the defending champions, having won their sixth title in the 2025–26 season.

== Teams ==
Locations of the teams in the 2026–27 Campeonato Nacional

Team	Location	Stadium	Capacity
Benfica	Seixal (Quinta da Trindade)	Benfica Campus	2,721
Braga	Braga (Andorinhas)	Estádio Amélia Morais	2,500
Marítimo	Funchal (Quinta do Falcão)	Campo da Imaculada Conceição	1,824
Porto	Vila Nova de Gaia (Seixo Alvo - Olival)	Estádio Luís Filipe de Menezes	3,800
Racing Power	Setúbal (Pontes)	Complexo Municipal de Atletismo de Setúbal	1,500
Rio Ave	Vila do Conde (Lapa)	Estádio do Rio Ave FC	5,300
Sporting CP	Alcochete	Estádio Aurélio Pereira	1,180
Torreense	Torres Vedras	Estádio Manuel Marques	2,431
Valadares Gaia	Pedroso, Vila Nova de Gaia	Estádio Municipal Jorge Sampaio	8,500
Vitória de Guimarães	Guimarães (Oliveira do Castelo)	Academia Vitória SC	2,500

== League table ==
Pos	Team	Pld	W	D	L	GF	GA	GD	Pts	Qualification or relegation
1	Benfica	5	5	0	0	14	1	+13	15	Qualification for the Champions League league phase
2	Sporting CP	6	4	1	1	13	7	+6	13	Qualification for the Champions League second qualifying round
3	Torreense	6	4	0	2	19	4	+15	12	Qualification for the Champions League second qualifying round
4	Braga	6	3	2	1	9	4	+5	11	
5	Porto	6	2	4	0	7	4	+3	10	
6	Valadares Gaia	6	3	0	3	8	7	+1	9	
7	Racing Power	6	1	2	3	2	7	−5	5	
8	Vitória de Guimarães	5	1	1	3	2	8	−6	4	Qualification for the relegation playoffs
9	Rio Ave	6	0	2	4	1	8	−7	2	Qualification for the relegation playoffs
10	Marítimo	6	0	0	6	2	27	−25	0	Relegation to the II Divisão

Updated to match(es) played on 3 November 2026. Source: Portuguese Football Federation (in Portuguese)
Rules for classification: 1) Points; 2) Goal difference; 3) Number of goals scored

=== Positions by round ===
Team ╲ Round	1	2	3	4	5	6	7	8	9	10	11	12	13	14	15	16	17	18
Benfica	2	3	3	3	2	1												
Torreense	3	2	1	2	1	2												
Sporting CP	5	1	2	1	3	3												
Braga	1	4	4	4	5	4												
Porto	4	5	5	5	6	5												
Valadares Gaia	6	7	7	6	4	6												
Racing Power	8	6	6	7	7	7												
Vitória de Guimarães	7	9	9	9	9	8												
Rio Ave	9	8	8	8	8	9												
Marítimo	10	10	10	10	10	10												

Leader and 2027–28 UEFA Champions League league stage
2027–28 UEFA Champions League second round
2027–28 UEFA Champions League first round
Relegation playoffs
Relegation to the II Divisão

Updated to match(es) played on 3 November 2026. Source: Portuguese Football Federation (in Portuguese)

== Results ==
Home \ Away	BEN	BRA	MAR	POR	RAC	RIO	SPO	TOR	VAL	VIT
Benfica	—			a	3–0		4–1			
Braga		—	5–0				0–0	0–3		a
Marítimo	0–4		—	1–2						
Porto	a	1–1		—	0–0		a			0–0
Racing Power		0–2			—	0–0			1–0	
Rio Ave	0–2	0–1		1–1		—				
Sporting CP	a		5–0	a			—	3–2	2–1	2–0
Torreense	0–1		8–0			3–0		—		
Valadares Gaia			3–1	1–3		1–0			—	
Vitória de Guimarães		a			2–1			0–3	0–2	—

Updated to match(es) played on 3 November 2026. Source: Portuguese Football Federation (in Portuguese)
Legend: Blue = home team win; Yellow = draw; Red = away team win.
For upcoming matches, an "a" indicates there is an article about the rivalry between the two participants.

=== Results by round ===
Team ╲ Round	1	2	3	4	5	6	7	8	9	10	11	12	13	14	15	16	17	18
Benfica	W	W	P	W	W	W												
Braga	W	D	D	W	L	W												
Marítimo	L	P	L	L	L	L					L							
Porto	W	D	D	D	D	W												
Racing Power	L	W	D	L	D	L												
Rio Ave	L	L	L	D	D	L												
Sporting CP	W	P	D	W	L	W					W							
Torreense	W	W	W	L	W	L												
Valadares Gaia	L	L	W	W	W	L												
Vitória de Guimarães	L	L	P	L	D	W												

Updated to match(es) played on 3 November 2026. Source: Portuguese Football Federation (in Portuguese)
W = Win; D = Draw; L = Loss; P = Postponed

== Season statistics ==
As of 3 November 2026

=== Top scorers ===
Rank	Player	Club	Goals
1	(Portugal) Telma Encarnação	Sporting CP	5
2	(Spain) Bárbara Latorre	Torreense	4
2	(Brazil) Nycole Raysla	Benfica	4
2	(Brazil) Malu Schmidt	Braga	4
5	(United States) Maile Hayes	Torreense	3
5	(United States) Leah Lewis	Braga	3
5	(Australia) Ella Tonkin	Torreense	3
5	(Brazil) Janaina Weimer	Torreense	3
9	(Canada) Chandra Davidson	Benfica	2
9	(Portugal) Ana Dias	Sporting CP	2
9	(United States) Jennie Lakip	Torreense	2
9	(Norway) Marit Lund	Benfica	2
9	(Denmark) Caroline Møller	Benfica	2
9	(Brazil) Matilda Nave	Valadares Gaia	2

==== Hat-tricks ====
Player	For	Against	Result	Date

=== Clean sheets ===
Rank	Player	Club	Clean sheets
1	(Germany) Lena Pauels	Benfica	4
2	(Portugal) Rute Costa	Torreense	3
2	(United States) Cassie Coster	Sporting CP	3
2	(United States) Samantha Leshnak Murphy	Braga	3
2	(United States) Taylor Rath	Racing Power	3
6	(United States) Cora Brendle	Porto	2
6	(United States) Erin Seppi	Valadares Gaia	2
8	(United States) Genevieve Crenshaw	Racing Power	1
8	(Portugal) Carolina Jóia	Torreense	1
8	(Brazil) Aline Lima	Braga	1
8	(Thailand) Tiffany Sornpao	Vitória de Guimarãraes	1

=== Discipline ===
==== Player ====
- Most yellow cards: 3
  - (Portugal) Matilde Sousa (Valadares Gaia)
- Most red cards: 1
  - (Portugal) Bruna Aguiar (Marítimo)
  - (Portugal) Matilde Sousa (Valadares Gaia)

==== Club ====
- Most yellow cards: 13
  - Valadares Gaia
- Most red cards: 1
  - Marítimo
  - Valadares Gaia
- Fewest yellow cards: 1
  - Benfica
- Fewest red cards: 0
