= Leah de Oliveira =

South African Australian soccer player (born 2006)

Personal information
- Date of birth: 17 February 2006 (age 20)
- Place of birth: Cape Town, Western Cape, South Africa
- Position: Forward

Team information
- Current team: Marítimo

Youth career
- –2023: Football NSW Institute

Senior career*
Years	Team	Apps	(Gls)
2023–2024	APIA Leichhardt		
2024	Estoril Praia U19	12	(11)
2024–2025	Estoril Praia	3	(1)
2025–	Marítimo	17	(1)

International career
2022–2023	Australia U17	3	(0)
- * Club domestic league appearances and goals as of 16 March 2026

Leah de Oliveira (Portuguese: [d‿ɔ.liˈvɐj.ɾɐ]; born 17 February 2006) is a professional soccer player who plays as a striker for Campeonato Nacional Feminino (Liga BPI) club Marítimo. She previously played for National Premier Leagues NSW Women's (NPL NSW Women's) club APIA Leichhardt and Liga BPI club Estoril Praia. Born in South Africa, she has represented Australia at under-17 level.

== Early life ==
De Oliveira was born on 17 February 2006 in Cape Town, Western Cape. She is of Portuguese descent through her grandparents, who were born and raised on the island of Madeira. Her family migrated from South Africa to Australia, where she was raised and began her soccer career, playing youth soccer for the Football NSW Institute until 2023.

== Club career ==
=== APIA Leichhardt ===
De Oliveira began her senior career in 17 years old, signing for National Premier Leagues NSW Women's (NPL NSW Women's) club APIA Leichhardt ahead of the 2023 season. She left the club during the 2024 season to sign for Portuguese side Estoril Praia in the Campeonato Nacional Feminino (Liga BPI).

=== Estoril Praia ===
In June 2024, De Oliveira moved to Portugal and signed for Campeonato Nacional Feminino (Liga BPI) club Estoril Praia ahead of the 2024–25 season. Initially playing for their under-19s team, she made her debut for the first team on 7 October 2024, making a cameo appearance as a substitute in a 2–1 loss at home to Braga at Estádio António Coimbra da Mota in Bairro Fausto de Figueiredo, Estoril. She departed the club at the end of the season following the club's relegation to the II Divisião Feminino for the 2025–26 season, finishing her spell with one goal in three brief appearances.

=== Marítimo ===
In August 2025, de Oliveira signed for Campeonato Nacional Feminino (Liga BPI) club Marítimo ahead of the 2025–26 season. She made her debut for the club on 21 September 2025 in the opening round of the season, starting in a 4–2 home loss to Torreense at Campo da Imaculada Conceição in Quinta do Falcão, Funchal. She scored her first goal for the club on 7 December 2025 in a 2–1 loss away to Vitória de Guimarães at Academia Vitória SC in Oliveira do Castelo, Guimarães.

== International career ==
Per FIFA eligibility rules, de Oliveira is eligible to represent three countries internationally: Australia (where she was raised), Portugal (through her Madeiran grandparents) and South Africa (the country she and her parents were born in).

In June 2022, de Oliveira was selected twice by coach Rae Dower for the Australia under-17 national team for two training camps ahead of the 2022 AFF U-18 Women's Championship from July to August in Palembang, Indonesia, with the first camp being in Wollongong and the second camp being in Brisbane. She was later selected by Dower for the official tournament's 28-player squad. At the tournament, she played in two group stage matches: a 4–0 win over the Philippines on 25 July (coming on as a substitute) and an 8–0 win over Malaysia on 27 July (the only match in the tournament that she started in), both held at Jakabaring Athletic Field. She also came on as a substitute in the final on 4 August at Gelora Sriwijaya Stadium, which Australia won 2–0 over Vietnam to clinch their first title.
