= Carolina Correia =

Portuguese footballer

Personal information
- Full name: Carolina Costa Malheiro Dias Correia
- Date of birth: 3 April 2002 (age 24)
- Place of birth: Lisbon, Portugal
- Height: 1.72 m (5 ft 8 in)
- Position: Centre-back

Team information
- Current team: Torreense
- Number: 5

Youth career
- 2015–2018: Casa Pia A.C.
- 2018–2020: Benfica

Senior career*
| Years | Team | Apps | (Gls) |
| 2020–2024 | Benfica | 18 | (1) |
| 2020–2021 | → Damaiense (loan) | 21 | (1) |
| 2023–2024 | → Torreense (loan) | 22 | (0) |
| 2024– | Torreense | 22 | (1) |

International career^{‡}
| 2020 | Portugal U19 | 1 | (0) |
| 2022–2023 | Portugal U23 | 3 | (0) |
| 2024– | Portugal | 2 | (0) |
- * Club domestic league appearances and goals as of 20 July 2025 ‡ National team caps and goals as of 20 July 2025

Carolina Costa Malheiro Dias Correia (born 3 April 2002) is a Portuguese professional footballer who played as a centre-back for Torreense and the Portugal national team.

== International career ==
Correia was part of Portugal's 23-player squad that participated in the UEFA Women's Euro 2025 in Switzerland.

== Honours ==
Benfica

- Campeonato Nacional Feminino: 2021–22, 2022–23
- Taça da Liga: 2022–23
- Supertaça de Portugal: 2022

Torreense

- Taça de Portugal: 2024–25

Individual

- Record Campeonato Nacional Feminino Best XI: 2025–26
