= Ana Seiça =

Portuguese footballer (born 2001)

Personal information
- Full name: Ana Rita da Silva Seiça
- Date of birth: 25 March 2001 (age 25)
- Place of birth: Coimbra, Portugal
- Height: 1.69 m (5 ft 7 in)
- Position: Centre-back

Youth career
- 2010–2012: Juventude Arzila
- 2012–2015: Casaense
- 2015–2017: Académica
- 2017–2018: Condeixa

Senior career*
Years	Team	Apps	(Gls)
2018–2019	Condeixa	18	(8)
2019–2024	Benfica	63	(11)
2024–2025	UANL	40	(0)

International career^{‡}
2016	Portugal U16	5	(0)
2016	Portugal U17	5	(0)
2019–2020	Portugal U19	14	(0)
2023–	Portugal	12	(0)
- * Club domestic league appearances and goals as of 10 June 2025 ‡ National team caps and goals as of 10 June 2025

Ana Rita da Silva Seiça (born 25 March 2001) is a Portuguese footballer who plays as a centre-back. She previously played for Clube Condeixa, Benfica, and Tigres UANL.

== Club career ==
From the age of eight, Seiça played football for various clubs in the Coimbra region before joining Condeixa in 2017. Their first team competed in the II Divisão (second division). She stayed there for two seasons before joining Benfica for three seasons. She made her official debut in the Supertaça de Portugal on 8 September 2019, coming on in the 75th minute as a substitute for Raquel Infante. Benfica won 1–0 against Braga. Her first start came two months later, on 2 November 2019, in the 10th round of the Liga BPI (Campeonato Nacional Feminino), a 10–0 victory against Cadima. She scored the final goal for As Águias in the 88th minute. In May 2021, she renewed her contract with Benfica, which linked her to the club until 2024.

After five seasons with the Encarnadas (Reds), having played 121 matches, scored 11 goals, and won five league titles, four League Cups, three Super Cups, and one Portuguese Cup, Seiça joined the Mexican club Tigres UANL in June 2024.

== International career ==
On 30 May 2023, she was included in the 23-player squad for the FIFA Women's World Cup 2023.

On 24 June 2025, Seiça was called up to the Portugal squad for the UEFA Women's Euro 2025.

== Honours ==
Benfica

- Campeonato Nacional Feminino: 2020–21, 2021–22, 2022–23, 2023–24
- Taça de Portugal: 2023–24
- Taça da Liga: 2019–20, 2020–21, 2022–23, 2023–24
- Supertaça de Portugal: 2019, 2022, 2023
