= Malu Schmidt =

Brazilian footballer (born 2000)

Personal information
- Full name: Maria Luísa Schmidt
- Date of birth: 4 December 2000 (age 25)
- Place of birth: Marechal Cândido Rondon, Paraná, Brazil
- Height: 1.70 m (5 ft 7 in)
- Position: Forward

Team information
- Current team: Braga
- Number: 9

Youth career
- 2016–2017: Foz Cataratas
- 2017–2019: Tiger Academia

Senior career*
Years	Team	Apps	(Gls)
2020–2021	Napoli	24	(9)
2021	Valadares Gaia B	5	(3)
2021–2022	Valadares Gaia	21	(12)
2022	Länk Vilaverdense B	2	(1)
2022–2023	Länk Vilaverdense	22	(9)
2023	Ceará	1	(0)
2023–2024	Valadares Gaia	22	(9)
2024–	Braga	41	(22)
- * Club domestic league appearances and goals as of 29 September 2026

Maria Luísa Schmidt (Brazilian Portuguese: [maˈɾi.a luˈizɐ], Hunsrik: [ʃmɪt]; born 4 December 2000), also known mononymously as Malu (Brazilian Portuguese: [maˈlu]), is a Brazilian footballer who plays as an inside forward for Campeonato Nacional Feminino (Liga BPI) club Braga. She previously played for Campeonato Brasileiro de Futebol Feminino Série A1 (Brasileirão Feminino) club Napoli, and Liga BPI clubs Valadares Gaia and Länk Vilaverdense.

== Early life ==
Schmidt was born on 4 December 2000 in Marechal Cândido Rondon, a municipality in the state of Paraná, Brazil. She is of German descent, being a part of the municipality's large German community.

Schmidt initially played futsal, before transitioning into football by the age of 19.

== Career ==
=== Napoli (2020–2021) ===
Schmidt began playing senior football at the age of 19, beginning at Campeonato Brasileiro de Futebol Feminino (Brasileirão Feminino) club Napoli in the 2020 season. She left the club during the 2021 season.

=== Valadares Gaia (2021–2022) ===
For her first venture overseas, Schmidt moved to Portugal, where she signed for Campeonato Nacional Feminino (Liga BPI) club Valadares Gaia ahead of the 2021–22 season.

=== Länk Vilaverdense (2022–2023) ===
Ahead of the 2022–23 season, Schmidt made her first intra-league transfer in the Liga BPI, signing for Länk Vilaverdense.

=== Ceará (2023) ===
In the European offseason, Schmidt very briefly returned home to sign for Brasileirão Feminina club Ceará. However, she only played one match for the club before departing, making her sole appearance by coming on as a substitute in a 1–1 draw with Atlético Mineiro at home at Cidade Vizão in Itaitinga, Ceará on 12 June 2023.

=== Valadares Gaia (2023–2024) ===
Schmidt rejoined Liga BPI club Valadares Gaia ahead of the 2023–24 season. She finished as the club's top goalscorer that season, scoring 16 goals in all competitions. On 25 November 2023, she scored a hat-trick in a 4–2 away victory over Albergaria at the Estádio Municipal António Augusto Martins Pereira in Albergaria-a-Velha, Aveiro District, earning her a Player of the Match (POTM) award. She departed the club at the end of the season.

=== Braga (2024–) ===
Schmidt signed for Liga BPI club Braga ahead of the 2024–25 season. On 11 February 2025, in a midseason friendly match, she became the first ever goalscorer at the new Estádio Amélia Morais in Braga, Braga District, scoring in a 2–1 victory over visiting French side Paris Saint-Germain (PSG). She finished the season as the club's top goalscorer.

Schmidt remained at the club for the 2025–26 season. On 14 January 2026, she scored a hat-trick in a 3–2 home victory over Benfica in the Taça da Liga Feminina at Estádio 1º de Maio in Braga. The result was regarded as an upset due to Benfica's dominance in Portuguese women's football and the fact that Benfica had gone unbeaten in 13 straight domestic matches prior to the defeat. She finished the season as the Liga BPI's joint top scorer, but did not win the Golden Boot as Benfica's Carole Costa (a Portuguese centre-back) won the award under the goals per game tiebreaker rule, as while both players scored 10 goals, Costa had a better average of 0.71 goals per game. At the 2026 Gala das Campeãs, held at the Casino Estoril in Estoril, Cascais, Lisbon District, she was named in the Best 11, the league's official team of the season, alongside teammate Nádia Bravo (a Portuguese midfielder).

Ahead of the 2026–27 season, Schmidt extended her contract for three years, keeping her under contract at the club until 2029.

== Personal life ==
In 2026, Schmidt stated that one of her biggest long-term goals is to play for the Brazil national team. While she is yet to be called up, she maintains a belief that she could be selected provided she continues to be in good form, despite Brazil's deep depth in attacking positions.
