= 2025–26 Campeonato Nacional Feminino =

Portuguese women's football league season

Campeonato Nacional Feminino
- Season: 2025–26
- Dates: 14 September 2025 – 10 May 2026
- Champions: Benfica
- Relegated: Damaiense
- Champions League: Benfica; Sporting CP; Torreense
- Matches: 90
- Goals: 247 (2.74 per match)
- Top goalscorer: Carole Costa; Malu Schmidt (10 goals each)
- Best goalkeeper: Cassie Coster (7 clean sheets)
- Biggest home win: Benfica 8–0 Damaiense; 27 September 2025
- Biggest away win: Damaiense 0–6 Sporting CP; 24 September 2025
- Highest scoring: Benfica 8–0 Damaiense; 27 September 2025
- Longest winning run: 6 games Benfica
- Longest unbeaten run: 18 games Benfica
- Longest winless run: 14 games Damaiense
- Longest losing run: 6 games Marítimo

The 2025–26 Campeonato Nacional Femenino, known as the 2025–26 Liga BPI for sponsorship reasons, is the 41st and current season of the Campeonato Nacional Feminino, the top division of women's football in Portugal.

Benfica were the defending champions, having won their fifth title in the 2024–25 season, and successfully revalidated their title with their sixth consecutive league trophy.

== Teams ==
Locations of the teams in the 2025–26 Campeonato Nacional

The number of teams in the league was decreased to 12, down from 10 in the previous season.

Team	Location	Stadium	Capacity
Benfica	Seixal (Quinta da Trindade)	Benfica Campus	2,721
Braga	Braga (Andorinhas)	Estádio Amélia Morais	2,500
Damaiense	Loulé (Caliços)	Estádio Algarve	30,305
Marítimo	Funchal (Quinta do Falcão)	Campo da Imaculada Conceição	1,824
Racing Power	Oeiras (Pontes)	Complexo Municipal de Atletismo de Setúbal	1,500
Rio Ave	Vila do Conde (Lapa)	Estádio do Rio Ave FC	5,300
Sporting CP	Alcochete	Academia Cristiano Ronaldo	1,180
Torreense	Queijas (Linda a Pastora)	Estádio Nacional	37,593
Valadares Gaia	Pedroso	Estádio Municipal Jorge Sampaio	8,500
Vitória de Guimarães	Guimarães (Oliveira do Castelo)	Academia Vitória SC	2,500

=== Personnel and kits ===
Team	Manager	Captain	Kit manufacturer
Benfica	(Portugal) Ivan Baptista		
Braga	(Germany) Marwin Bolz		
Damaiense	(Iceland) Kristján Guðmundsson		
Marítimo	(Portugal) Luís Gabriel		
Racing Power	(Portugal) Albano Oliveira		
Rio Ave	(Portugal) João Marques		
Sporting CP	(Portugal) Micael Sequeira		
Torreense	(Portugal) Gonçalo Nunes		
Valadares Gaia	(Portugal) Zé Nando		
Vitória de Guimarães	(Portugal) Ivo Roque		

=== Managerial changes ===
Team	Outgoing manager	Manner of departure	Date of vacancy	Position in table	Incoming manager	Date of appointment
Braga	(Portugal) Miguel Santos	Resigned	13 May 2025	Preseason	(Germany) Marwin Bolz	26 May 2025
Marítimo	(Portugal) Albano Oliviera	End of contract	13 May 2026	Preseason	(Portugal) Luís Gabriel	23 May 2025
Benfica	(Portugal) Filipa Patão	Signed by (United States) Boston Legacy	25 June 2025	Preseason	(Portugal) Ivan Baptista	8 July 2025
Racing Power	(Spain) Manolo Cano	Signed by (China) Wuhan Three Towns	6 September 2025	Preseason	(Spain) Yerai Martin	6 September 2025
Racing Power	(Spain) Yerai Martin	Signed by (Spain) Tenerife	29 December 2025	5th	(Portugal) Albano Oliveira	7 January 2026

== League table ==
Pos	Team	Pld	W	D	L	GF	GA	GD	Pts	Qualification or relegation
1	Benfica (C)	18	15	3	0	58	11	+47	48	Qualification for the Champions League league phase
2	Sporting CP	18	10	5	3	35	16	+19	35	Qualification for the Champions League second qualifying round
3	Torreense	18	10	2	6	29	22	+7	32	Qualification for the Champions League second qualifying round
4	Valadares Gaia	18	7	5	6	21	22	−1	26	
5	Braga	18	6	6	6	26	21	+5	24	
6	Vitória de Guimarães	18	4	9	5	16	23	−7	21	
7	Racing Power	18	4	6	8	16	23	−7	18	
8	Rio Ave (O)	18	4	5	9	10	18	−8	17	Qualification for the relegation playoffs
9	Marítimo (O)	18	4	2	12	19	40	−21	14	Qualification for the relegation playoffs
10	Damaiense (R)	18	2	5	11	17	51	−34	11	Relegation to the II Divisão

Source: Portuguese Football Federation (in Portuguese)
Rules for classification: 1) Points; 2) Goal difference; 3) Number of goals scored;
(C) Champions; (O) Play-off winners; (R) Relegated

=== Positions by round ===
Team ╲ Round	1	2	3	4	5	6	7	8	9	10	11	12	13	14	15	16	17	18
Benfica	7	1	1	1	1	1	1	1	1	1	1	1	1	1	1	1	1	1
Sporting CP	5	3	2	2	2	2	2	2	2	2	2	2	2	2	2	2	2	2
Torreense	10	5	7	9	7	8	5	4	3	4	4	3	3	3	3	3	3	3
Valadares Gaia	2	4	6	7	4	5	3	3	4	3	3	4	4	4	4	4	4	4
Braga	9	9	10	8	3	4	7	7	7	6	6	5	5	5	5	6	6	5
Vitória de Guimarães	4	10	9	10	6	6	4	6	5	5	5	6	6	6	7	5	5	6
Racing Power	8	2	3	3	5	3	6	5	6	8	8	7	7	7	6	7	7	7
Rio Ave	6	7	4	4	8	7	8	8	9	9	9	9	9	8	8	8	8	8
Marítimo	3	8	5	5	9	10	10	10	8	7	7	8	8	9	9	9	9	9
Damaiense	1	6	8	6	10	9	9	9	10	10	10	10	10	10	10	10	10	10

Leader and 2026–27 UEFA Champions League league stage
2026–27 UEFA Champions League second round
2026–27 UEFA Champions League first round
Relegation playoffs
Relegation to the II Divisão

Source: Portuguese Football Federation (in Portuguese)

== Results ==
Home \ Away	BEN	BRA	DAM	MAR	RAC	RIO	SPO	TOR	VAL	VIT
Benfica	—	3–2	8–0	5–0	0–0	2–0	3–1	2–0	2–2	5–1
Braga	1–3	—	1–2	1–2	0–0	0–0	1–1	1–1	0–0	2–0
Damaiense	0–4	0–3	—	1–2	1–1	1–1	0–6	0–4	1–3	1–1
Marítimo	1–3	0–2	3–3	—	1–2	2–1	0–4	2–4	0–1	0–1
Racing Power	0–5	1–2	2–2	3–0	—	1–0	2–3	0–2	0–1	1–1
Rio Ave	0–1	0–2	2–0	1–1	1–0	—	1–3	1–0	0–2	0–0
Sporting CP	1–1	3–1	3–0	1–0	0–0	2–1	—	2–3	2–0	1–1
Torreense	0–2	2–5	3–1	3–1	2–1	1–0	2–0	—	0–1	2–1
Valadares Gaia	1–4	1–1	1–3	2–3	2–1	0–1	0–2	2–0	—	1–1
Vitória de Guimarães	1–5	2–1	3–1	2–1	0–1	0–0	0–0	0–0	1–1	—

Source: Portuguese Football Federation (in Portuguese)
Legend: Blue = home team win; Yellow = draw; Red = away team win.
For upcoming matches, an "a" indicates there is an article about the rivalry between the two participants.

=== Results by round ===
Team ╲ Round	1	2	3	4	5	6	7	8	9	10	11	12	13	14	15	16	17	18
Benfica	D	W	W	W	W	W	W	D	W	W	W	W	D	W	W	W	W	W
Braga	L	D	L	W	W	D	L	D	L	W	D	W	D	D	L	L	W	W
Damaiense	W	L	L	D	L	D	L	D	L	L	L	L	D	D	L	W	L	L
Marítimo	D	L	W	L	L	L	L	D	W	W	L	L	L	L	L	L	W	L
Racing Power	D	W	D	D	L	W	L	D	L	L	L	W	D	L	W	L	L	D
Rio Ave	D	L	W	D	L	D	L	L	L	L	W	L	D	D	W	L	W	L
Sporting CP	D	W	W	W	L	D	W	D	W	D	W	W	W	L	W	W	L	D
Torreense	L	L	L	L	W	L	W	W	W	L	W	W	D	W	L	W	D	W
Valadares Gaia	W	D	L	L	W	D	W	W	L	W	D	L	D	W	D	L	L	W
Vitória de Guimarães	D	L	D	D	W	D	W	L	W	D	L	L	D	D	D	W	D	L

Source: Portuguese Football Federation (in Portuguese)
W = Win; D = Draw; L = Loss; P = Postponed

== Promotion/relegation playoffs ==
Both playoff winners will qualify for the 2026–27 Campeonato Nacional Feminino.

=== Group 1 ===
24 May 2026
14:00

Marítimo	1–0	Albergaria
Ferreira 72'

Estádio do Marítimo, Funchal

30 May 2026
11:00

Albergaria	0–0	Marítimo

Estádio Municipal António Augusto Martins Pereira, Albergaria-a-Velha

Marítimo won 1–0 on aggregate

=== Group 2 ===
23 May 2026
15:00

Rio Ave	1–1	Gil Vicente
Gerrie 70' (o.g.)		Brændstrup 36'

Estádio do Rio Ave FC, Vila do Conde

31 May 2026
11:00

Gil Vicente	0–2	Rio Ave
		Mateus 13', 50'

Complexo Desportivo De São Martinho, São Martinho do Porto

Rio Ave won 3–1 on aggregate

== Season statistics ==
=== Top scorers ===
Rank	Player	Club	Goals
1	(Portugal) Carole Costa	Benfica	10
1	(Brazil) Malu Schmidt	Braga	10
3	(Brazil) Nycole Raysla	Benfica	8
3	(Portugal) Carolina Santiago	Sporting CP	8
3	(Brazil) Lidiane Antunes	Damaiense	8
6	(Canada) Chandra Davidson	Benfica	7
6	(Portugal) Diana Silva	Benfica	7
6	(Portugal) Telma Encarnação	Sporting CP	7
6	(Brazil) Janaina Weimer	Torreense	7
10	(Venezuela) Daniuska Rodríguez	Torreense	6
10	(Portugal) Betinha	Vitória de Guimarães	6

==== Hat-tricks ====
Player	For	Against	Result	Date
(Portugal) Carolina Santiago	Sporting CP	Damaiense	6–0 (A)	23 September 2025
(Haiti) Brittany Raphino	Sporting CP	Marítimo	4–0 (A)	11 October 2025
(Portugal) Carolina Santiago	Sporting CP	Damaiense	3–0 (H)	7 February 2026

=== Clean sheets ===
Rank	Player	Club	Clean sheets
1	(United States) Cassie Coster	Rio Ave	7
2	(Germany) Lena Pauels	Benfica	6
2	(Portugal) Patrícia Morais	Braga	6
4	(Thailand) Tiffany Sornpao	Vitória de Guimarães	5
5	(Germany) Anna Wellmann	Sporting CP	4
5	(Portugal) Catarina Potra	Sporting CP	4
5	(Portugal) Erin Seppi	Valadares Gaia	4
5	(Spain) Natalia Expósito	Racing Power	4
9	(Portugal) Rute Costa	Torreense	3
9	(Portugal) Carol Alves	Valadares Gaia	3

=== Discipline ===
==== Player ====
- Most yellow cards: 6
  - (United States) Rielee Fetty (Rio Ave)
  - (Canada) Tianna Harris (Marítimo)
- Most red cards: 2
  - (Portugal) Érica Costa (Marítimo)

==== Club ====
- Most yellow cards: 34
  - Vitória de Guimarães
- Most red cards: 4
  - Marítimo
- Fewest yellow cards: 19
  - Benfica
- Fewest red cards: 0
  - Benfica
  - Rio Ave
  - Vitória de Guimarães
