= Catarina Amado =

Portuguese footballer (born 1999)

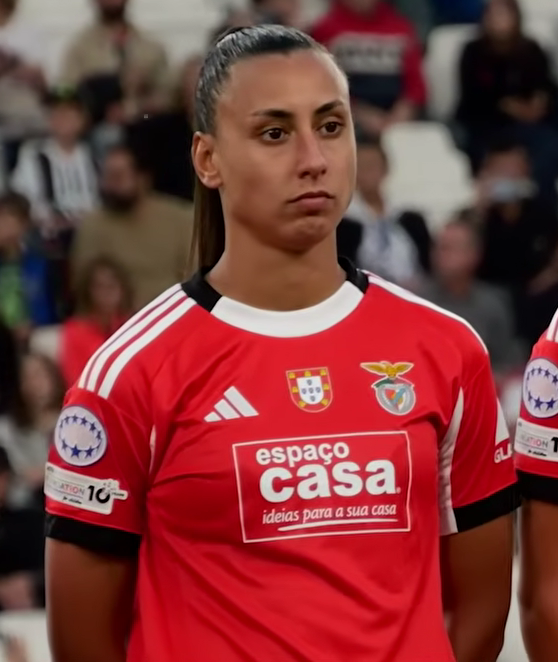
- Amado with Benfica in 2025

Personal information
- Full name: Catarina Isabel Silva Amado
- Date of birth: 21 July 1999 (age 27)
- Place of birth: Lousã, Coimbra, Portugal
- Height: 1.65 m (5 ft 5 in)
- Position: Right-back

Team information
- Current team: Benfica
- Number: 19

Youth career
- 2008–2014: Lousanense
- 2014–2015: Poiares

Senior career*
| Years | Team | Apps | (Gls) |
| 2015–2016 | Poiares | | |
| 2016–2019 | Estoril Praia | 54 | (35) |
| 2019– | Benfica | 131 | (8) |

International career^{‡}
| 2014–2015 | Portugal U17 | 6 | (4) |
| 2015–2018 | Portugal U19 | 26 | (6) |
| 2021– | Portugal | 46 | (2) |
- * Club domestic league appearances and goals as of 10 June 2025 ‡ National team caps and goals as of 10 June 2025

Catarina Isabel Silva Amado (born 21 July 1999) is a Portuguese footballer who plays as a right-back for SL Benfica in the Campeonato Nacional Feminino and the Portugal national team.

== International career ==
On 30 May 2023, she was included in the 23-player squad for the FIFA Women's World Cup 2023.

On 24 June 2025, Amado was called up to the Portugal squad for the UEFA Women's Euro 2025.

== Honours ==
Benfica

- Campeonato Nacional Feminino: 2020–21, 2021–22, 2022–23, 2023–24
- Taça de Portugal: 2023–24
- Taça da Liga: 2019–20, 2020–21, 2022–23, 2023–24
- Supertaça de Portugal: 2019, 2022, 2023, 2026
- Record Campeonato Nacional Feminino Best XI: 2025–26

== International goals ==
| No. | Date | Venue | Opponent | Score | Result | Competition |
|---|---|---|---|---|---|---|
| 1. | 31 May 2024 | Estádio Dr. Magalhães Pessoa, Leiria, Portugal | Northern Ireland | 3–0 | 4–0 | UEFA Women's Euro 2025 qualifying |
| 2. | 4 April 2025 | Estádio Capital do Móvel, Paços de Ferreira, Portugal | Spain | 1–1 | 2–4 | 2025 UEFA Women's Nations League |
