= Rute Costa =

Portuguese football player (born 1994)

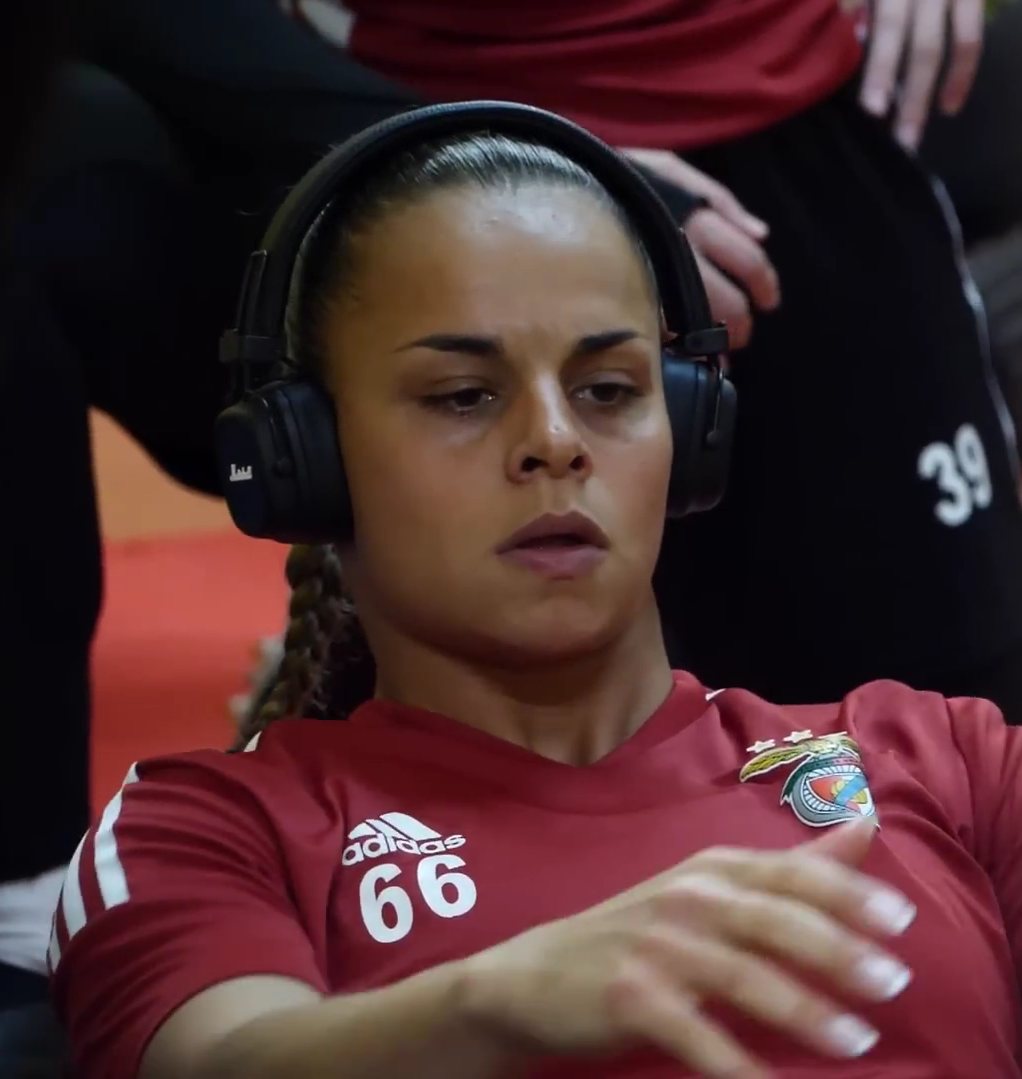
- Costa with Benfica in 2023

Personal information
- Full name: Ana Rute Campos Costa
- Date of birth: 1 June 1994 (age 32)
- Place of birth: Barcelos, Portugal
- Height: 1.70 m (5 ft 7 in)
- Position: Goalkeeper

Senior career*
Years	Team	Apps	(Gls)
2010–2012	Casa Povo Martim	1	(0)
2012–2014	Boavista F.C.	4	(0)
2014–2016	Clube de Albergaria	25	(0)
2016–2020	Braga	61	(0)
2020–2022	Famalicão	36	(0)
2022–2026	Benfica		(0)

International career^{‡}
2012	Portugal U19	1	(0)
2017–	Portugal	8	(0)
- * Club domestic league appearances and goals as of 15 January 2026 ‡ National team caps and goals as of 17 Feb 2023

Ana Rute Campos Costa (born 1 June 1994) is a Portuguese footballer who plays as a goalkeeper for Benfica of the Campeonato Nacional de Futebol Feminino.

== Career ==
=== Club ===
Costa started her career at Portuguese Second Division's team Casa do Povo de Martim, playing for the club in the 2011–12 season. In the 2015–16 season, while playing for Clube de Albergaria, she kept her 10th clean sheet in February 2016. That season she kept three consecutive clean sheets at the start of the season, and four in a row towards the end of the first phase. In 2016 Costa signed with S.C. Braga. Costa was voted the 2017–18 Campeonato Nacional de Futebol Feminino Goalkeeper of the Season in June 2018. In 2018 she extended her contract with Braga. During her four years with Braga, Costa won the Portuguese league, the Taça de Portugal Feminina and the Supertaça de Portugal Feminina once each.

In July 2020 Costa signed for Famalicão on a one-year contract. She subsequently joined Benfica in 2022 on a two-year deal.

=== International ===
Costa represented Portugal at several levels, starting on 15 March 2012 in a 2-1 defeat against Wales U19 team. On 19 January 2017 Costa debuted for the Portugal senior team in a 1-0 defeat against Northern Ireland. On 6 July 2017 she was called by coach Francisco Neto to represent Portugal at the UEFA Women's Euro 2017, the first time the Portugal national team qualified for a women's football major tournament.

On 30 May 2023, she was included in the 23-player squad for the FIFA Women's World Cup 2023.

== Personal life ==
Costa played volleyball for her entire adolescence and she almost became a professional player. Costa graduated in Sports science and has a Master's degree in her field of study.

== Honours ==
Boavista

- Taça de Portugal de Futebol Feminino: 2012–13

Braga

- Campeonato Nacional: 2018–19
- Taça de Portugal Feminina: 2019–20
- Supertaça de Portugal: 2018

Benfica

- Campeonato Nacional: 2022–23, 2023–24, 2024–25
- Taça de Portugal: 2023–24
- Taça da Liga: 2022–23, 2023–24, 2024–25
- Supertaça de Portugal: 2022, 2023
