= Zoe Matthews =

American soccer player (born 2007)

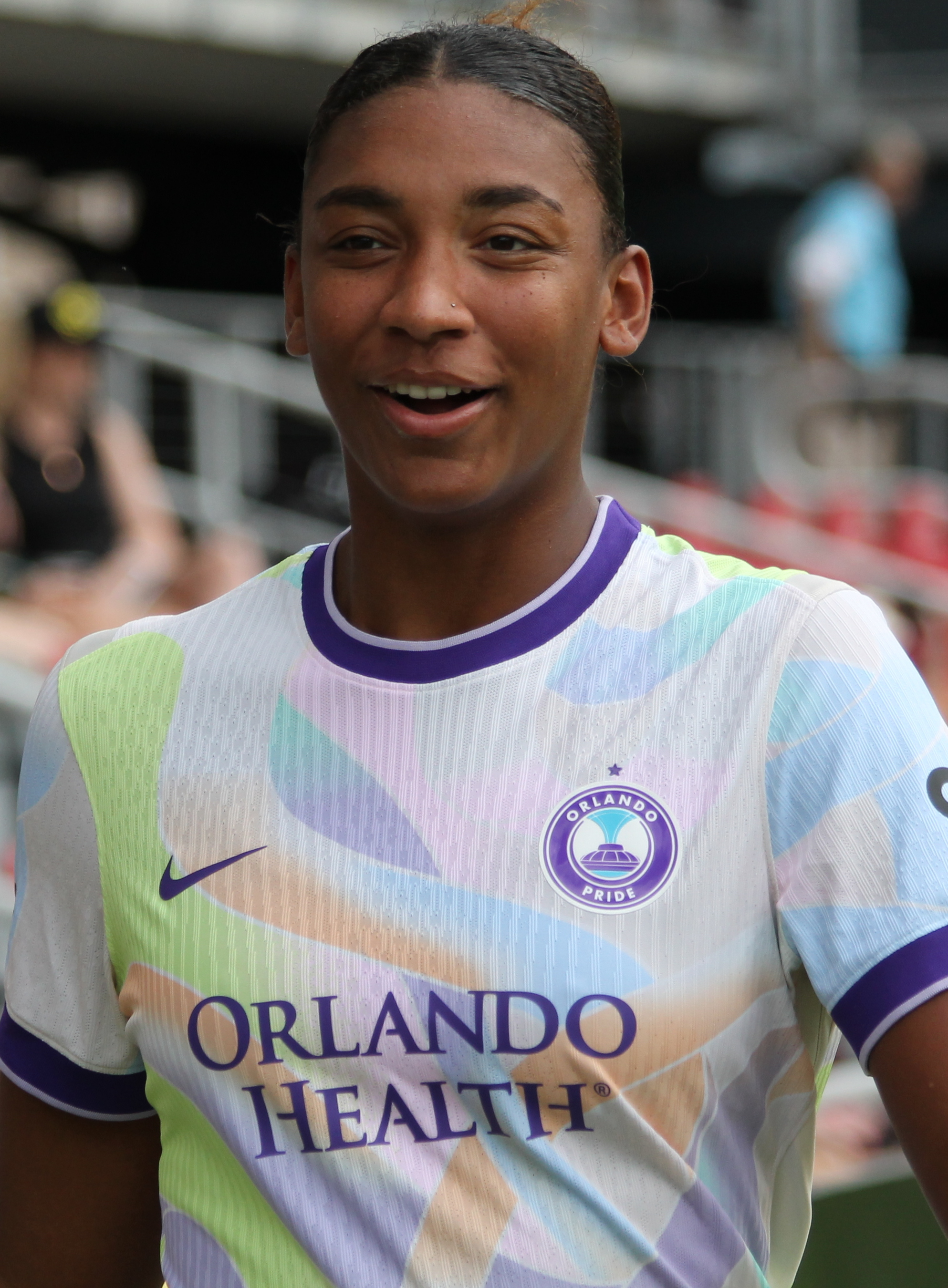
- Matthews with the Orlando Pride in 2026

Personal information
- Full name: Zoe Noel Matthews
- Date of birth: May 25, 2007 (age 19)
- Height: 6 ft 2 in (1.88 m)
- Positions: Midfielder; defender

Team information
- Current team: Orlando Pride
- Number: 33

Youth career
- Solar SC
- 2021–2023: Southlake Carroll Dragons
- 2022–2024: Legends FC

Senior career*
Years	Team	Apps	(Gls)
2024–2026	Houston Dash	2	(0)
2025	→ Dux Logroño (loan)	8	(0)
2026	→ Benfica (loan)	0	(0)
2026–	Orlando Pride	3	(0)

International career
2023	United States U-16	3	(1)
2025–	United States U-20	2	(0)
- * Club domestic league appearances and goals as of 03:26, November 8, 2026 (UTC)

Zoe Noel Matthews (born May 25, 2007) is an American professional soccer player who plays as a midfielder or defender for the Orlando Pride of the National Women's Soccer League (NWSL). She started her professional career with the Houston Dash at age 17 in 2024.

== Early life ==
Matthews grew up in Southlake, Texas, the daughter of Jason and Angie Matthews. She played high school soccer at Carroll Senior High School, leading the team to the UIL Class 6A state championship as a freshman in 2022. She scored a goal and had an assist in the final as teammate Kennedy Fuller scored a hat trick in the 4–0 win. She scored 22 goals and tallied 26 assists as a sophomore, being named All-American by United Soccer Coaches in 2023. She played ECNL club soccer for Solar SC and Legends SC, earning all-conference honors twice. She helped lead both teams to ECNL national finals, winning the under-14 title with Solar SC in 2021 and finishing runner-up for the under-17 title with Legends SC in 2024. She played as an attacking midfielder growing up and was mentored by North Carolina Courage midfielder Brianna Pinto through the group Voice in Sport. Before going pro, she was committed to play college soccer for the LSU Tigers.

== Club career ==
=== Houston Dash ===
National Women's Soccer League (NWSL) club Houston Dash announced on October 11, 2024, that they had signed Matthews to her first professional contract on a three-year deal running through 2026. The following week, she made her professional debut against the Seattle Reign, replacing Sarah Puntigam as a 85th-minute substitute in a 2–1 loss. She became the youngest player in Dash history and the youngest African American to play in the NWSL.

On August 20, 2025, having barely featured for Houston, Matthews was sent to newly promoted Liga F club Dux Logroño on a season-long loan. She joined the Spanish club alongside Dash teammate Rebeca. On September 6, she made her club debut – and first professional start – in a 1–0 loss to Real Sociedad. She made nine appearances before the loan ended after half a season.

On February 2, 2026, Matthews joined Benfica on loan for the rest of the Campeonato Nacional Feminino season. Benfica initially announced that they had activated a purchase option in the loan, signing Matthews to a three-year contract through 2029, but it was later revealed that the loan had not been made permanent due to medical reasons. She made no appearances for the Portuguese champions, and agreed to leave the Dash when the loan expired.

=== Orlando Pride ===
On July 16, 2026, it was announced that Matthews had signed with the NWSL's Orlando Pride until the end of the season.

== International career ==
Matthews is eligible to represent the United States and Jamaica internationally. In 2022, she trained with the United States under-15 and under-16 teams. The same year, she was called up to the Jamaica national team at age 15 by head coach Lorne Donaldson. She played a friendly tournament with the United States under-16s in 2023, scoring in a pre-tournament friendly against hosts France and starting in the final with high school teammate Kennedy Fuller. She trained with the United States under-18 and under-19 teams in 2024 and 2025. She was called into a development camp, training concurrently with the senior national team, in January 2026.

== Honors ==
Benfica

- Campeonato Nacional Feminino: 2025–26
- Taça de Portugal: 2025–26
