= Pauleta (footballer, born 1997) =

Portuguese footballer

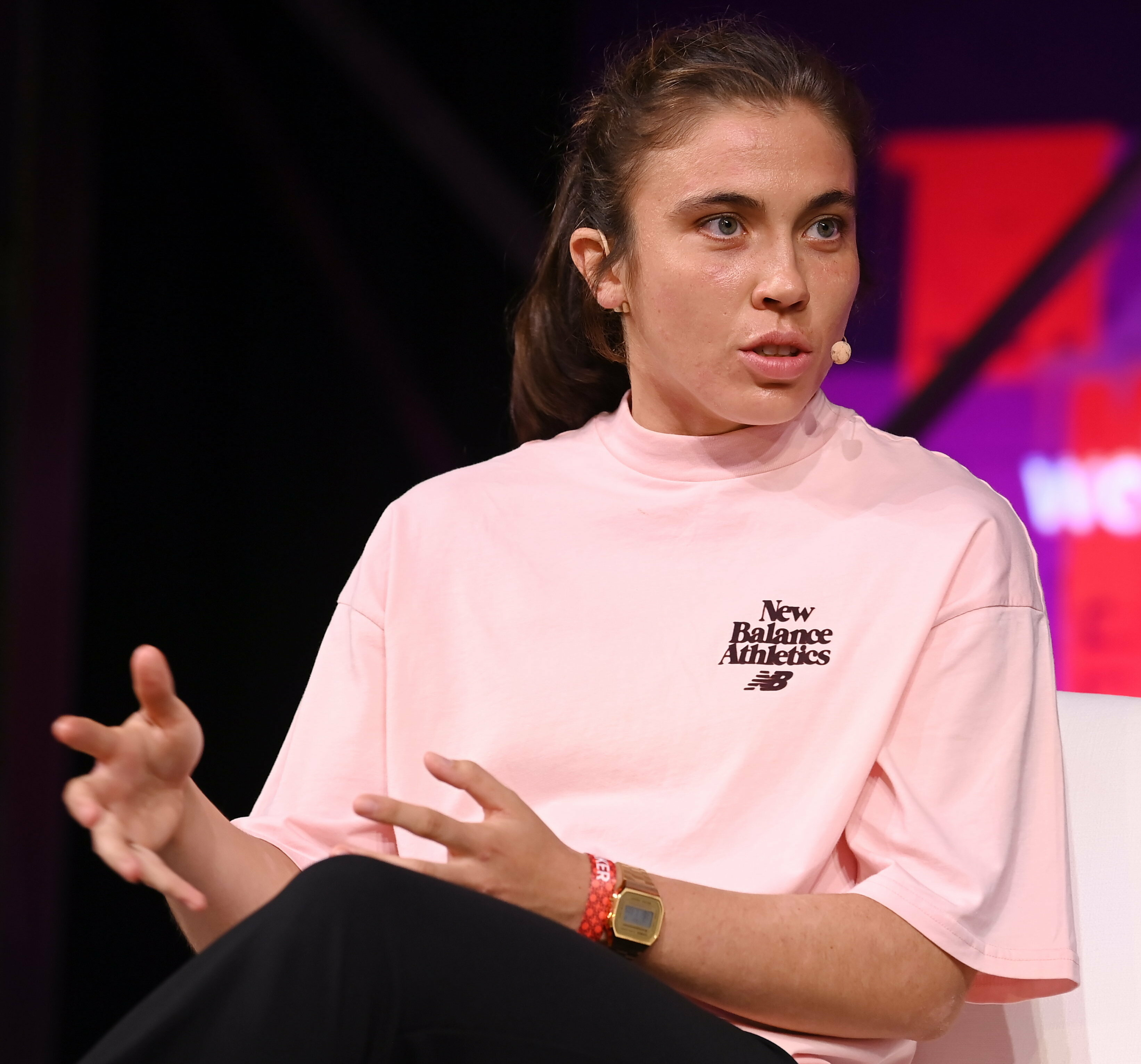
- Pauleta at Web Summit in 2022

Personal information
- Full name: Paula Domínguez Encinas
- Date of birth: 11 August 1997 (age 29)
- Place of birth: Redondela, Pontevedra, Galicia, Spain
- Height: 1.71 m (5 ft 7 in)
- Position: Midfielder

Team information
- Current team: Benfica
- Number: 21

Senior career*
Years	Team	Apps	(Gls)
2013–2016	El Olivo		
2016–2018	Braga	41	(23)
2018–	Benfica	96	(24)

International career^{‡}
2026–	Portugal	4	(0)
- * Club domestic league appearances and goals as of 4 June 2024 ‡ National team caps and goals as of 22:01, 2 November 2026 (UTC)

Paula Domínguez Encinas (born 11 August 1997), known as Pauleta, is a professional footballer who plays for Campeonato Nacional Feminino club Benfica as a midfielder. Born in Spain, she plays for the Portugal national team. Alongside her football career, she studies chemistry at university.

== International career ==
Born in Spain, Pauleta moved to Portugal at the age of 18, and eventually gained Portuguese nationality. In February 2026, she was called up to the Portugal national team.

== Personal life ==
Pauleta married her long-time partner Nerea Blanco on 20 June 2026.

== Honours ==
Benfica

- Campeonato Nacional Feminino: 2020–21, 2021–22, 2022–23, 2023–24
- Campeonato Nacional II Divisão Feminino: 2018–19
- Taça de Portugal: 2018–19, 2023–24
- Taça da Liga: 2019–20, 2020–21, 2022–23, 2023–24
- Supertaça de Portugal: 2019, 2022, 2023
