= Ana Rute =

Portuguese footballer (born 1998)

Personal information
- Full name: Ana Rute Santos Marques Rodrigues
- Date of birth: 29 January 1998 (age 28)
- Height: 1.72 m (5 ft 8 in)
- Position: Midfielder

Team information
- Current team: Braga
- Number: 23

Senior career*
Years	Team	Apps	(Gls)
2015-2018	AD Poiares		
2018-2021	Condeixa		
2021-	Braga	81	(15)

International career^{‡}
2021–	Portugal	8	(0)
- * Club domestic league appearances and goals as of 20 June 2025 ‡ National team caps and goals as of 20 June 2025

Ana Rute Santos Marques Rodrigues (born 29 January 1998) is a Portuguese footballer who plays as a midfielder for Campeonato Nacional Feminino club SC Braga and the Portugal women's national team.

== International career ==
Ana Rute made her debut for Portugal against Israel . On 30 May 2023, she was included in the 23-player squad for the 2023 FIFA Women's World Cup.

== Honours ==
Braga

- Taça da Liga: 2021–22
