= Natalia Expósito =

Spanish footballer (born 1997)

Personal information
- Full name: Natalia Expósito Reyes
- Date of birth: 20 October 1997 (age 29)
- Place of birth: Madrid, Spain
- Height: 1.70 m (5 ft 7 in)
- Position: Goalkeeper

Team information
- Current team: Sporting de Huelva
- Number: 1

Senior career*
Years	Team	Apps	(Gls)
2013–2014	Atlético Madrid C		
2014–2017	Atlético Madrid B		
2017–2018	Rayo Vallecano B		
2018–2019	Madrid CFF	7	(0)
2019–2021	Rayo Vallecano	2	(0)
2021–2023	Madrid CFF	3	(0)
2023–2024	Dux Logroño		
2024–2025	Sporting de Huelva		
2025–	Racing Power	4	(0)
- * Club domestic league appearances and goals as of 13:23, 17 April 2022 (UTC)

Natalia Expósito Reyes (born 20 October 1997) is a Spanish footballer who plays as a goalkeeper for Campeonato Nacional Feminino club Racing Power.

== Club career ==
Expósito started her career at Atlético Madrid C.
