= Women's football in Portugal =

Overview of Poland in football

Women's Football in Portugal
- Country: Portugal
- Governing body: Portuguese Football Federation
- National team: Women's national team

National competitions
- FIFA Women's World Cup; UEFA Women's Championship

Club competitions
- League: Campeonato Nacional Feminino; Campeonato Nacional II Divisão; Campeonato Nacional III; Cups: Taça de Portugal (Portuguese Cup); Taça da Liga (League Cup); Supertaça (Supercup)

International competitions
- UEFA Women's Champions League

Audience records
- Single match: 27,211

Women's football in Portugal is growing in popularity.

== Club Football ==
Campeonato Nacional de Futebol Feminino is Portugal's highest tier of women's football.

=== National Title Winners (by season) ===
Season	Champions*	Taça de Portugal	Supertaça	Taça da Liga
1985–86	Boavista	--	--	--
1986–87	Boavista (2)	--	--	--
1987–88	Boavista (3)	--	--	--
1988–89	Boavista (4)	--	--	--
1989–90	Boavista (5)	--	--	--
1990–91	Boavista (6)	--	--	--
1991–92	Boavista (7)	--	--	--
1992–93	Boavista (8)	--	--	--
1993–94	Boavista (9)	--	--	--
1994–95	Boavista (10)	--	--	--
1995–96	Lobão	--	--	--
1996–97	Boavista (11)	--	--	--
1997–98	Gatões	--	--	--
1998–99	Gatões (2)	--	--	--
1999–2000	1º de Dezembro	--	--	--
2000–01	Gatões (3)	--	--	--
2001–02	1º de Dezembro (2)	--	--	--
2002–03	1º de Dezembro (3)	--	--	--
2003–04	1º de Dezembro (4)	1º de Dezembro	--	--
2004–05	1º de Dezembro (5)	Sport Marítimo Murtoense	--	--
2005–06	1º de Dezembro (6)	1º de Dezembro (2)	--	--
2006–07	1º de Dezembro (7)	1º de Dezembro (3)	--	--
2007–08	1º de Dezembro (8)	1º de Dezembro (4)	--	--
2008–09	1º de Dezembro (9)	Escola FC	--	--
2009–10	1º de Dezembro (10)	1º de Dezembro (5)	--	--
2010–11	1º de Dezembro (11)	1º de Dezembro (6)	--	--
2011–12	1º de Dezembro (12)	1º de Dezembro (7)	--	--
2012–13	Atlético Ouriense	Boavista	--	--
2013–14	Atlético Ouriense (2)	Atlético Ouriense	--	--
2014–15	Futebol Benfica	Futebol Benfica	--	--
2015–16	Futebol Benfica (2)	Futebol Benfica (2)	Futebol Benfica	--
2016–17	Sporting CP	Sporting CP	Valadares Gaia	--
2017–18	Sporting CP (2)	Sporting CP (2)	Sporting CP	--
2018–19	SC Braga	SL Benfica	SC Braga	--
2019–20	abandoned	SC Braga	SL Benfica	SL Benfica
2020–21	SL Benfica	abandoned	abandoned	SL Benfica (2)
2021–22	SL Benfica (2)	Sporting CP (3)	Sporting CP (2)	SC Braga
2022–23	SL Benfica (3)	FC Famalicão	SL Benfica (2)	SL Benfica (3)
2023–24	SL Benfica (4)	SL Benfica (2)	SL Benfica (3)	SL Benfica (4)
2024–25	SL Benfica (5)	S.C.U. Torreense	Sporting CP (3)	SL Benfica (5)
2025–26	SL Benfica (6)	SL Benfica (3)	S.C.U. Torreense	S.C.U. Torreense
2026–27			SL Benfica (4)	

Notes: * Includes both the "Taça Nacional" and "Campeonato Nacional". The abandoned competitions relate to the restrictions imposed by the Portuguese government during the COVID-19 pandemic.

=== Major Honours by club ===
#	Club	Championships	Taça de Portugal	Supertaça	Taça da Liga	Total
1	1º de Dezembro	**12**	**7**	0	0	19
2	SL Benfica	6	3	**4**	**5**	18
3	Boavista	11	1	0	0	12
4	Sporting CP	2	3	3	0	8
5	Futebol Benfica	2	2	1	0	5
6	SC Braga	1	1	1	1	4
7	Atlético Ouriense	2	1	0	0	3
7	Gatões	3	0	0	0	3
7	S.C.U. Torreense	0	1	1	1	3
8	Lobão	1	0	0	0	1
8	Marítimo Murtoense	0	1	0	0	1
8	FC Famalicão	0	1	0	0	1
8	Escola	0	1	0	0	1
8	Valadares Gaia	0	0	1	0	1

Bold denotes club with the most number of trophies in the specified category.

Updated as of June 1st, 2026

== International Team ==
Since the 21st Century, Portugal has seen an upsurge of success, with the national team qualifying for the UEFA Women's Championship twice and reaching the World cup once.
