= Pauels =

Pauels is a German and Dutch surname. Notable people with the surname include:

- Lena Pauels (born 1998), German footballer
- Willibert Pauels (born 1954), German Büttenrede (carnival speaker), singer, guitarist and Roman Catholic deacon
