= Pauleta (disambiguation) =

Pauleta (born 1973) is a Portuguese footballer.

Pauleta may also refer to:

- Pauleta (footballer, born 1997) (Paula Domínguez Encinas), Spanish women's footballer
- Pauleta (footballer, born 1998) (Paula Sancho Gutiérrez), Spanish women's footballer
- Pauleta (futsal player) (Paulo César Vaz Mendes, born 1994), Portuguese futsal player
- Paulo César Martin (1962–2026), Brazilian journalist and radio host who used the pseudonym Pauleta
