= Daniuska Rodríguez =

Venezuelan footballer (born 1999)

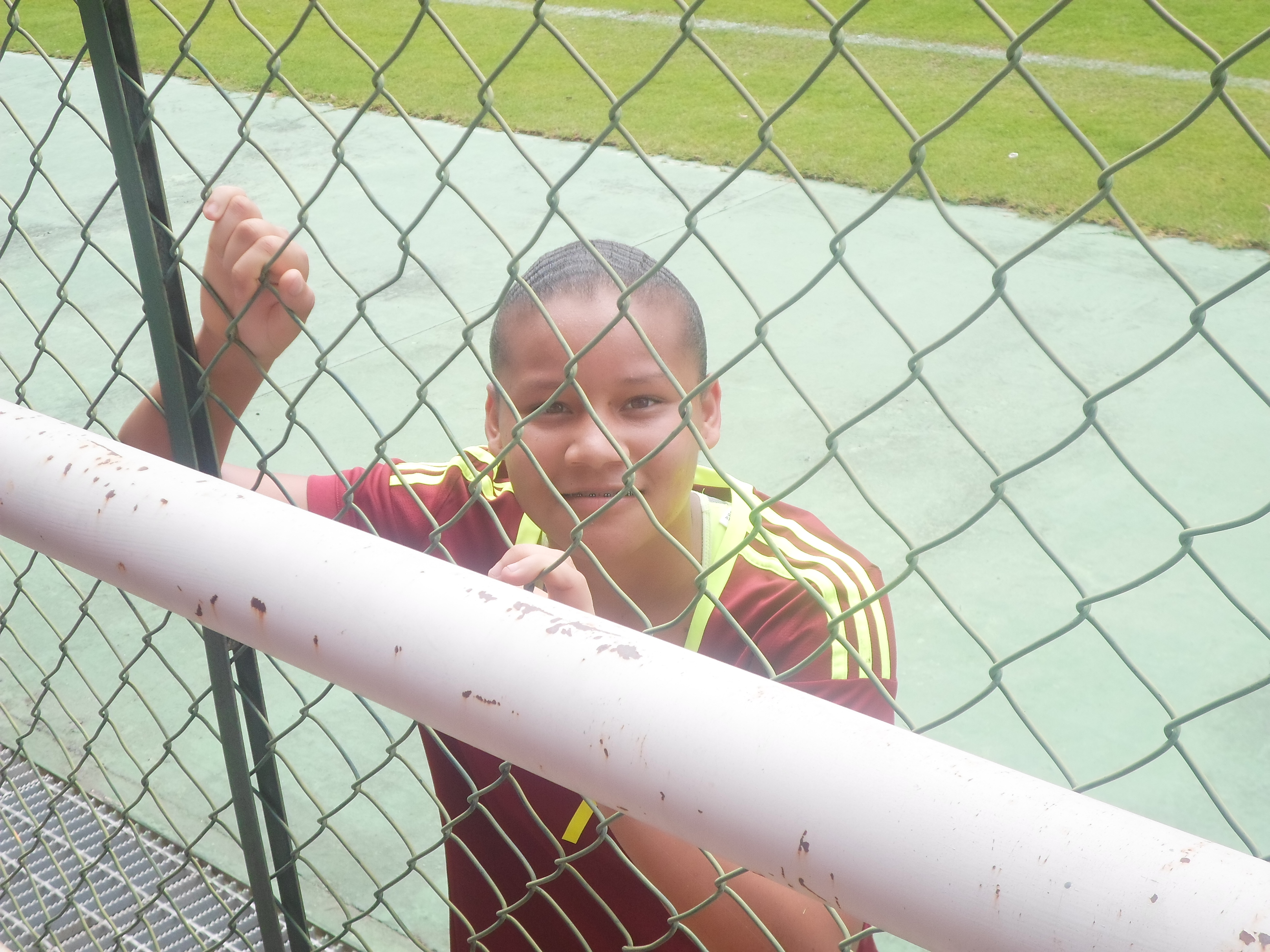

Personal information
- Full name: Daniuska Isamar Rodríguez Pineda
- Date of birth: 4 January 1999 (age 27)
- Place of birth: Ciudad Ojeda, Venezuela
- Height: 1.66 m (5 ft 5 in)
- Position: Midfielder

Team information
- Current team: Torreense

Senior career*
Years	Team	Apps	(Gls)
–2018	AFF San Diego		
2018–2021	Braga	24	(5)
2021–	Torreense	15	(1)

International career^{‡}
2014–2016	Venezuela U17	20	(9)
2014–2018	Venezuela U20	7	(0)
2014–	Venezuela	8	(1)
- * Club domestic league appearances and goals as of 26 March 2022 ‡ National team caps and goals as of 22:04, 23 March 2015 (UTC)

Daniuska Isamar Rodríguez Pineda (born 4 January 1999) is a Venezuelan footballer who plays as a midfielder for Torreense and the Venezuela women's national team. She ranked third in the FIFA Puskas Award 2016.

== International career ==
Rodríguez represented Venezuela at the 2014 South American U-20 Women's Championship.
