= Jennie Lakip =

American soccer player (born 1990)

Jennie Marshall Lakip
Personal information
- Full name: Jennie Marshall Lakip
- Date of birth: September 15, 1990 (age 36)
- Place of birth: Kirkland, Washington, United States
- Height: 5 ft 6 in (1.68 m)
- Position: Forward

Team information
- Current team: S.C.U. Torreense
- Number: 22

College career
Years	Team	Apps	(Gls)
2008–2011	BYU Cougars	89	(17)

Senior career*
Years	Team	Apps	(Gls)
2021	Dimas Escazú	15	(14)
2021–2022	Alajuelense	17	(12)
2023–2024	Querétaro	15	(7)
2024–2026	Valadares Gaia	57	(35)
2026–	Torreense	8	(6)
- * Club domestic league appearances and goals as of 28 September 2026

Jennie Marshall Lakip (Jen-née Marshall: born September 15, 1990) is an American soccer player who plays as a striker for Campeonato Nacional Feminino (Liga BPI) club Torreense.

== Early life ==
Lakip attended Brigham Young University in the United States, where she was regarded as one of the soccer team's most important players.

== Career ==
While playing for Costa Rican side Dimas Escazú, Lakip was the top scorer of the 2021 Costa Rican Women's Premier Division with fourteen goals. After that, she played for Costa Rican side Alajuelense. She was regarded as one of the club's most important players.

== Style of play ==
Lakip mainly operates as a striker and has been described as a "player with goals, control of the ball, a lot of technique and she also knows how to use her body very well".

== Personal life ==
Lakip is a Mormon, being a member of The Church of Jesus Christ of Latter-day Saints (LDS Church). She married husband Romy A. Lakip in 2013, and has two children.

Lakip has regarded Norway international Erling Haaland as her football idol.
