= Nycole Raysla =

Brazilian footballer

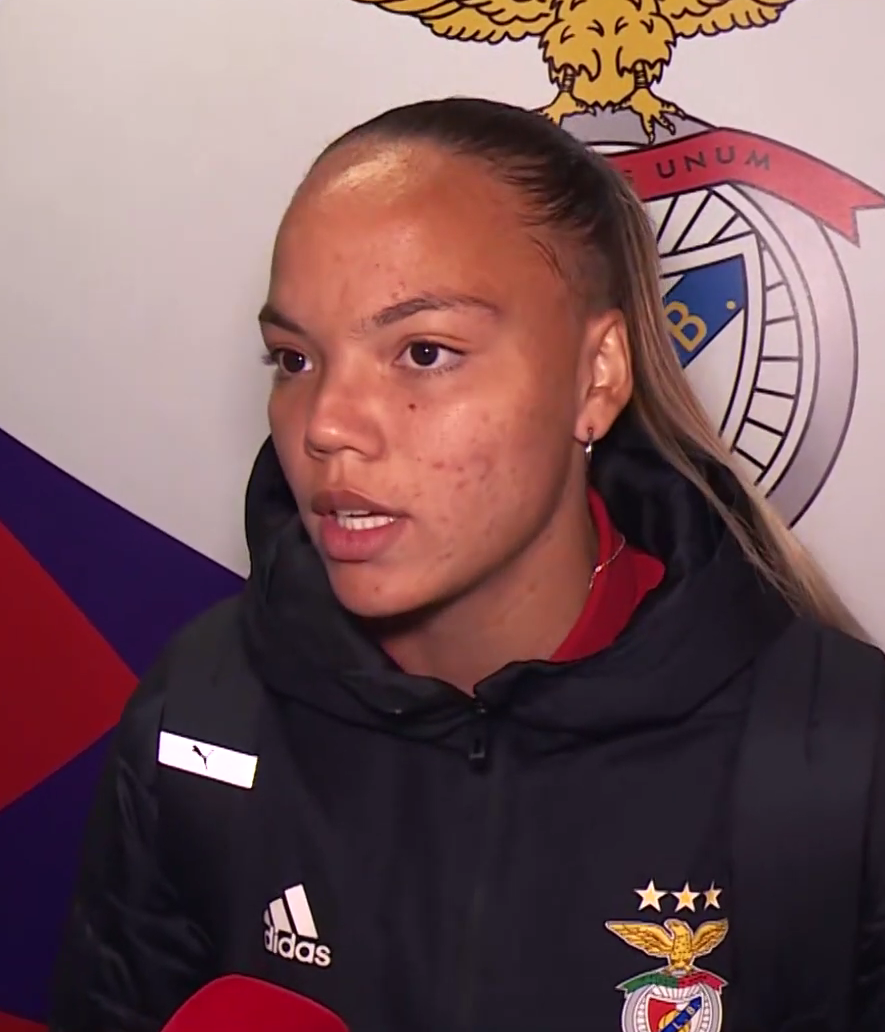
- Raysla in 2021

Personal information
- Full name: Nycole Raysla Silva Sobrinho
- Date of birth: 26 March 2000 (age 26)
- Place of birth: Brasília, Brazil
- Height: 1.73 m (5 ft 8 in)
- Position: Forward

Team information
- Current team: Benfica
- Number: 9

Senior career*
Years	Team	Apps	(Gls)
2018	Sport Recife	23	(6)
2019	Minas Brasília	15	(4)
2019–	Benfica	73	(38)

International career^{‡}
2020–	Brazil	7	(1)
- * Club domestic league appearances and goals as of 30 September 2024 ‡ National team caps and goals as of 30 September 2024

Nycole Raysla Silva Sobrinho (born 26 March 2000) is a Brazilian professional footballer who plays as a forward for Portuguese club SL Benfica and the Brazil women's national team.

== Club career ==
On 6 August 2019, it was announced that Nycole Raysla would be joining Portuguese club Benfica, signing a two-year contract. After scoring 22 goals in 30 games for Benfica, her contract was extended until 2026.

== International career ==
Nycole Raysla made her debut for the Brazil national team on 28 November 2020 against Ecuador, coming on as a substitute for Ludmila da Silva.

== International goals ==
Goal	Date	Location	Opponent	Score	Result	Competition
1	2021-09-20	João Pessoa, Brazil	Argentina	3–0	4–1	Friendly game

== Honours ==
Benfica

- Campeonato Nacional Feminino: 2020–21, 2021–22, 2022–23, 2023–24
- Taça de Portugal Feminina: 2023–24
- Taça da Liga: 2019–20, 2020–21, 2022–23, 2023–24
- Supertaça de Portugal: 2019, 2022, 2023
