= Tiffany Sornpao =

American-born Thai footballer

Personal information
- Full name: Tiffany Darunee Sornpao
- Date of birth: 22 May 1998 (age 28)
- Place of birth: Duluth, Georgia, United States
- Height: 1.70 m (5 ft 7 in)
- Position: Goalkeeper

Team information
- Current team: Vitória de Guimarães
- Number: 18

Youth career
- 2014–2016: Duluth High School

College career
Years	Team	Apps	(Gls)
2017–2020	Kennesaw State Owls	52	(0)

Senior career*
Years	Team	Apps	(Gls)
2021	Keflavik	20	(0)
2022	Selfoss	21	(0)
2024–2025	Brøndby	7	(0)
2025–	Vitória de Guimarães	23	(0)

International career^{‡}
2019–	Thailand	29	(0)
- * Club domestic league appearances and goals as of 00:50, 05 February 2024 (UTC) ‡ National team caps and goals as of 05 February 2024

Tiffany Darunee Sornpao (Thai: ทิฟฟานี่ ดารุณี สอนเผ่า; RTGS: Daruni Sonphao; born 22 May 1998), is a professional footballer who plays as a goalkeeper for Vitória de Guimarães in Liga BPI. Born and raised in Georgia, United States, she represents the Thailand women's national team. Her national team debut was in 2019. She was rostered for the 2019 FIFA Women's World Cup in France. She appeared in the 2020 AFC Olympic Qualifiers, 2022 AFC Women's Asian Cup World Cup Qualifiers, 2022 Asian Games, 2023 SEA Games, and 2024 AFC Olympic Qualifiers.

== Early life ==
Sornpao was raised in Berkeley Lake, Georgia.

== Collegiate career ==
Sornpao redshirted her freshman year in 2016 for Kennesaw State University. In 2017 she appeared in 14 matches. She solidified her starting position and appeared in all matches for the 2018 and 2019 season. Due to Covid-19 Sornpao did not take her last season and decided to finish her degree in December 2020 and pursue her professional soccer career overseas.

== Club career ==
=== Keflavik, 2021 ===
Sornpao signed a one-year contract with the team. Playing in the Besta deild kvenna in Iceland.

=== UMF Selfoss, 2022 ===
Sornpao signed a one-year contract with the team. Playing in the Besta deild kvenna in Iceland.

=== Brondby IF, 2024-2025 ===
Sornpao signed a 2 year contract with the team. Playing in the A-Liga in Denmark.

=== Vitoria SC, 2025- ===
Sornpao signed a contract until the end of 2026-2027 season with the team. Playing in the Liga BPI in Portugal.

== International career ==
Sornpao was rostered and appeared in a total of 27 matches from 2019- .
