= Chandra Davidson =

Canadian soccer player

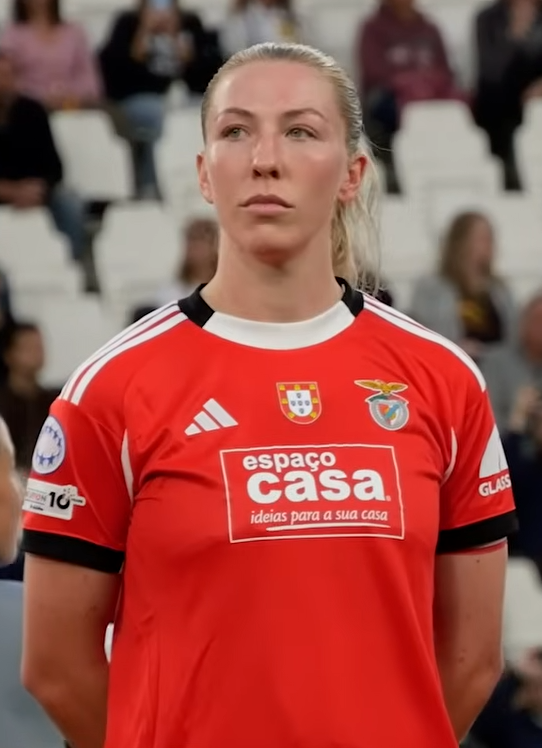
- Davidson with Benfica in 2025

Personal information
- Full name: Chandra Nicole Davidson
- Date of birth: May 15, 1998 (age 28)
- Place of birth: Hamilton, Ontario, Canada
- Height: 1.73 m (5 ft 8 in)
- Position: Forward

Team information
- Current team: Benfica
- Number: 25

Youth career
- St. Catharines Jets
- 2012: Burlington Bayhawks

College career
Years	Team	Apps	(Gls)
2016–2020	Indiana University	75	(13)

Senior career*
Years	Team	Apps	(Gls)
2020-2021	Torreense	18	(8)
2021–2023	Sporting CP	36	(11)
2023-2024	Fortuna Sittard	11	(2)
2024–	Benfica	38	(12)
- * Club domestic league appearances and goals as of 22:50, June 29, 2026 (UTC)

Chandra Nicole Davidson (born May 15, 1998) is a Canadian professional soccer player who plays as a forward for Campeonato Nacional Feminino club Benfica.

== Early life ==
Davidson was born in Hamilton, Ontario to parents Bill and Kathy. She attended Bishop Ryan Catholic Secondary School where she was two-time team MVP and league champion. She played for the U21 Provincial St. Catharines Jets and the Burlington Bayhawks. She was three-time MVP with Burlington and led the team to the 2012 National Club Championship, two Ontario Cup titles and an OYSL Championship. From 2011 to 2013, she was a member of Team Ontario, guiding the team to the 2013 National All-Star Championship.

== College career ==
Davidson attended Indiana University. In her freshman season in 2016, she played in 19 games and made 14 starts, bagging 1 goal and 1 assist. In 2017, she started all 19 games, scoring six goals and assisting 2. She was named Academic All-Big Ten. In 2018, she started all 18 games, netted a pair of goals and added 5 assists. She was once again named Academic All-Big Ten along with being named to the Big Ten Preseason Honors List. She was also a part of TopDrawerSoccer's National Team of the Week on September 18. In her final season, she served as captain, playing all 19 games, scoring 4 goals and assisting 1. Similar to the prior season, she was named Academic All-Big Ten and named to the Big Ten Preseason Honors List. Additionally, she was named Big Ten Distinguished Scholar. She graduated college with a Bachelor of Science in Exercise Science.

== Club career ==
In September 2020, she joined Portuguese club Torreense, scoring 8 goals in 19 games.

The following season, she signed with Sporting CP, playing 2 1/2 years for the club, appearing 53 times (in all competitions), scoring 21 goals and assisting 11.

During the 2023 summer transfer window, she left Portugal for Dutch club Fortuna Sittard. After 11 appearances and 2 goals for the club she returned to Portugal, signing a 2-year contract with Sporting CP rival, Benfica. Since joining, she has scored 5 goals and assisted 1 in 18 appearances. On March 3, 2024, she was awarded with Player of the Match.

== Career statistics ==
=== Club ===
As of May 12, 2024

Appearances and goals by club, season and competition
Club	Season	League			Domestic Cup		League Cup		Continental		Other		Total	
Club	Season	Division	Apps	Goals	Apps	Goals	Apps	Goals	Apps	Goals	Apps	Goals	Apps	Goals
Torreense	2020–21	Campeonato Nacional Feminino	18	8	—		1	0	—		—		19	8
Sporting CP	2021–22	Campeonato Nacional Feminino	19	7	6	5	4	4	—		—		29	16
Sporting CP	2022–23	Campeonato Nacional Feminino	17	4	3	0	4	1	—		—		24	5
Sporting CP	Total		54	19	9	5	9	5	0	0	0	0	72	29
Fortuna Sittard	2023–24	Eredivisie Vrouwen	11	2	—		—		—		—		11	2
Benfica	2023–24	Campeonato Nacional Feminino	10	3	3	1	2	1	2	0	0	0	17	5
Benfica	2024–25	Campeonato Nacional Feminino	17	2	1	0	2	1	4	1	2	0	26	4
Career total			75	24	12	6	10	6	2	0	0	0	99	36

== Honours ==
Sporting

- Supertaça de Portugal Feminina: 2021

Benfica

- Campeonato Nacional Feminino: 2023–24
- Taça da Liga Feminina: 2024
