= Lena Pauels =

German footballer (born 1998)

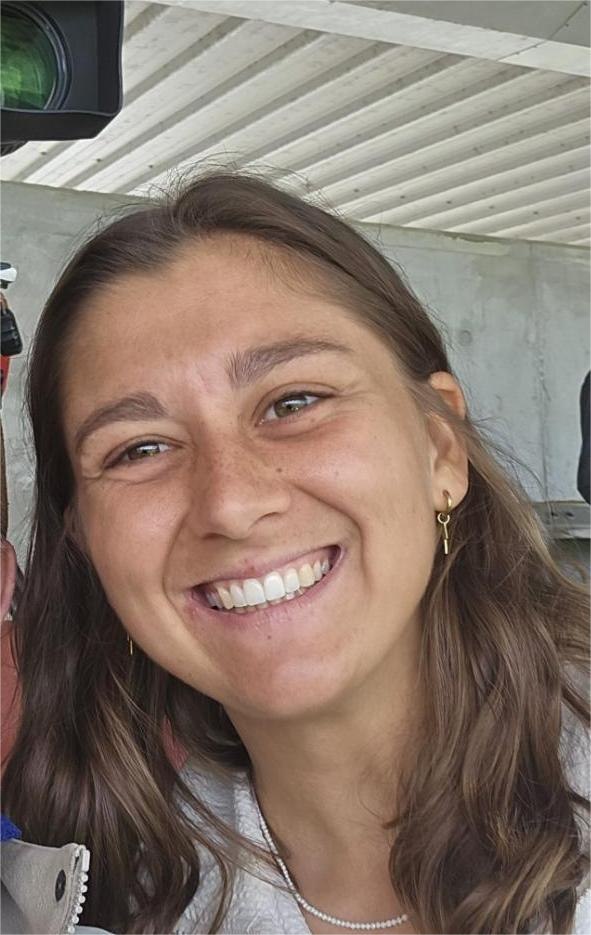
- Pauels in 2024

Personal information
- Date of birth: 2 February 1998 (age 28)
- Place of birth: Kevelaer, Germany
- Height: 1.78 m (5 ft 10 in)
- Position: Goalkeeper

Team information
- Current team: Benfica
- Number: 1

Youth career
- 20??–2013: Kevelaerer SV
- 2013–2015: SGS Essen

Senior career*
Years	Team	Apps	(Gls)
2014–2016	SGS Essen II	15	(0)
2015–2016	SGS Essen	3	(0)
2016–2023	Werder Bremen	76	(0)
2018–2023	Werder Bremen II	3	(0)
2023–	Benfica	41	(0)

International career
2012–2013	Germany U15	4	(0)
2013–2014	Germany U16	4	(0)
2014	Germany U17	2	(0)
2015–2017	Germany U19	14	(0)
2015–2018	Germany U20	4	(0)
- * Club domestic league appearances and goals as of 21:09, 24 December 2025 (UTC)

Lena Pauels (born 2 February 1998) is a German professional footballer who plays as a goalkeeper in Campeonato Nacional Feminino for the Portuguese club Benfica.

== International career ==
Pauels has represented Germany at youth level.

== Honours ==
Benfica

- Campeonato Nacional Feminino: 2023–24, 2024–25
- Taça de Portugal: 2023–24
- Taça da Liga: 2023–24, 2024–25
- Supertaça de Portugal: 2023

Individual

- Record Campeonato Nacional Feminino Best XI: 2025–26
