= U.R. Cadima =

Portuguese women's association football team

Cadima
- Full name: União Recreativa Cadima
- Founded: 18 August 1959 (65 years ago)
- Ground: Complexo Desportivo de Cantanhede; Candanhede, Portugal
- Capacity: 2,000
- President: Luis Gil
- Head coach: Filipe Silva
- League: Campeonato Nacional de Futebol Feminino
- 2018–19: Campeonato Nacional II Divisão, 2nd (promoted)
Home colours	Away colours

União Recreativa Cadima, commonly known as Cadima, is a Portuguese women's football team based in Cadima, Cantanhede, district of Coimbra.

== Players ==
=== Current squad ===
As of 19 October 2019

Note: Flags indicate national team as defined under FIFA eligibility rules; some limited exceptions apply. Players may hold more than one non-FIFA nationality.

No.	Pos.	Nation	Player
1	GK	(Portugal) POR	Mónica Carvalho
2	DF	(Portugal) POR	Mariana Rodrigues
4	MF	(Portugal) POR	Ana Cordeiro
5	MF	(Portugal) POR	Ana Mendes
6	MF	(Portugal) POR	Sónia Almeida
7	MF	(Portugal) POR	Dina Almeida
8	FW	(Portugal) POR	Beatriz Jesus
9	DF	(Portugal) POR	Petra Nunes
10	DF	(Portugal) POR	Sara Oliveira
11	FW	(Portugal) POR	Rita Dias
12	MF	(Portugal) POR	Maria Matos
14	MF	(Portugal) POR	Andreia Santos
15	DF	(Portugal) POR	Rita Oliveira

No.	Pos.	Nation	Player
16	DF	(Portugal) POR	Daniela Costa
18	FW	(Portugal) POR	Raquel Correia
19	FW	(Portugal) POR	Luana Marques
20	MF	(Portugal) POR	Daniela Pereira
21	FW	(Portugal) POR	Maria Amaro
23	MF	(Portugal) POR	Catarina Esteves
27	DF	(Portugal) POR	Ana Cristovão
29	DF	(Portugal) POR	Andreia Neves
31	MF	(Portugal) POR	Ana Matos
47	GK	(Portugal) POR	Carolina Proença
96	GK	(Portugal) POR	Telma Martins
—	MF	(Portugal) POR	Beatriz Costa
—	FW	(Cape Verde) CPV	Kleydiana Borges

== Honours ==
- National Championship

Runners-up (1): 2010–11

- AF Coimbra Cup

Winners (1): 2018–19
