= Boavista F.C. (women) =

Portuguese sports club

Boavista
- Full name: Boavista Futebol Clube
- Nicknames: As Panteras Negras (The Black Panthers); As Axadrezados (The Chequered ones)
- Founded: 1903; 123 years ago
- President: João Loureiro
- League: Campeonato Nacional de Futebol Feminino
- 2015-16: 7th
- Website: http://www.boavistafc.pt
Home colours	Away colours

Boavista Futebol Clube Women (Portuguese pronunciation: [boɐˈviʃtɐ]), commonly known as Boavista, is a women's football club based in Porto, Portugal. It is the women's football section off Boavista F.C.

== Current squad ==
As of 31 August 2020.

Note: Flags indicate national team as defined under FIFA eligibility rules; some limited exceptions apply. Players may hold more than one non-FIFA nationality.

No.	Pos.	Nation	Player
1	GK	POR	Cláudia Rocha
2	DF	POR	Sara Pinheiro
3	DF	POR	Isabel Silva "Belinha"
4	MF	POR	Claudia Calçada
5	DF	POR	Bruna Rocha
6	DF	POR	Orlanda Sousa "Landinha"
7	DF	POR	Rita Machado
8	MF	POR	"Xana" Rodrigues
9	MF	POR	Kiki Dias
10	FW	POR	Flavia Marinho "Fáfá"

No.	Pos.	Nation	Player
11	MF	POR	Paula Cristiana
13	DF	POR	Marcela Gomes
14	MF	POR	Sara Freitas
16	MF	POR	Adriana Gomes
17	FW	POR	Bárbara Azevedo "Babi"
18	FW	POR	Rita Pereira
19	MF	POR	Joana Gil "Jú"
20	FW	POR	Beatriz Rodrigues "Babi"
21	MF	POR	Rita Lage
27	FW	POR	Cláudia Lima

== Titles ==
=== Official ===
- Campeonato Nacional de Futebol Feminino: 11
  - 1985–86, 1986–87, 1987–88, 1988–89, 1989–90, 1990–91, 1991–92, 1992–93, 1993–94, 1994–95, 1996–97
- Taça de Portugal de Futebol Feminino: 1
  - 2012–13
