= S.C.U. Torreense (women) =

Women's football team in Portugal

Torreense
- Full name: Sport Clube União Torreense
- Nickname: Azul-grenás (The Blue-garnets)
- Short name: Torreense; SCUT
- Founded: 1 May 1917; 109 years ago (club); 1978; 48 years ago (section)
- Stadium: Estádio Manuel Marques
- Capacity: 2,431
- President: José Sebastião
- Head coach: Gonçalo Nunes
- League: Liga BPI
- 2025–26: Liga BPI, 3rd of 10
- Website: torreense.com
Home colours	Away colours

Sport Clube União Torreense ([toˈʁiẽsɨ], known simply as Torreense, SCUT, or, in this instance commonly as "Torreense Feminino" (lit. Torreense Women), is a Portuguese women's football team from Torres Vedras, within the sports club of the same name that was founded in 1917. It currently plays in the Campeonato Nacional Feminino, the first tier of portuguese women's football.

The club's women's football section was originally established in 1978 and played locally during the 1980s until it laid dormant for almost 25 years. After its revival, it rose to the country's top flight and is currently one of three teams to have won all three national cups (Taça, Taça da Liga and Supertaça). In 2026, the team had their debut in european competitions, in the UEFA Women's Champions League.

== History ==
=== A first iteration ===
At the tail end of 1978, the announcement for the creation of a women's football team within Sport Clube União Torreense was made. Although the team would not immediately begin play, the prospect and intention can still be considered vanguardist for the time and the country's context, considering the national team would only first play on 24 October 1981. Torreense would finally play its first match on 21 November 1982 at their home stadium of Campo Manuel Marques against Valcovense, a team from the municipality of Bombarral - it would be a positive debut for the section, having won 6-0.

Overall, the women's football landscape was not particularly structured during this time - indeed, the first national competition would only start in 1985-86 and a national league would only come to be established in 1993-94, which left only the currently-defunct Lisbon District Championship as official competitions, in which it participated in at least 1982-83 and 1983-84. In between, Torreense would frequently play small locally or club organised tournaments, such as Costa do Sol (1982) or even reportedly abroad in Palma de Mallorca (1983). Possibly the most notable meeting in this first period of the section, however, was their reception of the Dutch national team in a friendly on 5 January 1985.

The team, which was considerably funded through sponsors to the point of having the name Torreense/Destaque, after a local fashion store Destaque Modas; would keep playing matches into late 1987 until it laid dormant for the next several decades.

=== Revival ===
Nearly three decades later, the section returned after an announcement in October 2014 through the practice of youth football at the start of the 2015-16 season. Its senior team would be (re-)launched three seasons later for the 2018-19 season. The women's football pyramid in the country at this stage was still on the brink of its large expansion and with the inexistence of district leagues, was directly placed in the national second tier, which is in turn divided into local groups. They officially debuted on 23 September 2018 away at União de Almeirim, with a 2-2 draw and their first home match a week later on the 30th, a 3-0 defeat to Sintrense. The rest of the maiden voyage, with João Ferreira at the helm, was expectedly tough, finishing seventh of 9 teams with points from four victories and two draws in sixteen games - the wins from the two teams under them (Os Vidreiros and Pêgo) and the two other points against the aforementioned Almeirim, directly above.

== Stadium ==
The team typically play their matches at the club's Estádio Manuel Marques, which is usually capped at 2,431 for professional football matches.

After a poor pitch classification in 2024-25 during the men's team second-tier campaign, the women's team (as well as the men's under-23 team) ceased play at the ground and effectively became travelling teams. The women's team played the first half of the season at the Estádio Nacional at Jamor, some 52 kilometres from home, where they had won the Portuguese Cup just months before. Just after the season's halfway point, the team switched to the Estádio Municipal de Rio Maior (some 67 kilometres on the road from their home city), which hosted their last four home games, starting with their reception of Rio Ave on 21 February 2026.

During the Summer of 2026, the Manuel Marques had works to replace the grass pitch in time for the new season. It was officially inaugurated by the women's team in their homecoming and debut European reception, against Kolos Kovalivka.

== Players ==
=== Current squad ===
As of 18 September 2026

Note: Flags indicate national team as defined under FIFA eligibility rules; some limited exceptions apply. Players may hold more than one non-FIFA nationality.

No.	Pos.	Nation	Player
1	GK	BRA	Janny Belém
2	DF	POR	Bruna Ramos
3	DF	POR	Matilde Costa
4	DF	AUS	Ella Tonkin
5	MF	AUS	Sophie Hoban
6	FW	USA	Maile Hayes
7	MF	VEN	Daniuska Rodríguez
8	MF	BRA	Rafaela Rufino
9	FW	BRA	Janaina Weimer
10	MF	ESP	Bárbara Latorre
11	FW	POR	Daniela Silva
12	MF	NGR	Shakirat Moshood
14	DF	ESP	Núria Mendoza

No.	Pos.	Nation	Player
16	DF	POR	Catarina Pereira
17	FW	ENG	Tinaya Alexander
18	MF	POR	Vera Cid
19	FW	POR	Margarida Guerreiro
20	FW	POR	Matilde Fortes
21	MF	NED	Gerda Konst
22	FW	USA	Jennie Lakip
33	DF	POR	Carolina Pimenta
55	GK	POR	Carolina Jóia
66	GK	POR	Rute Costa
68	DF	POR	Bárbara Lopes
77	MF	POR	Raquel Ferreira (captain)
88	MF	POR	Nicole Lopes

== Honours ==
- Taça de Portugal Feminina (1): 2024-25
- Taça da Liga Feminina (1): 2025-26
- Supertaça de Portugal Feminina (1): 2025

=== Other notable results ===
- Campeonato Nacional Feminino, third place (european qualification): 2025-26
- II Divisão (tier 2), group winner: 2019-20

== European record ==
Torreense is presented as the home score (left) in the results shown.

SCU Torreense (women) results in international competitions
Season	Competition	Round	Opponent	Home	Away	Agg.
2026–27	UEFA Women's Champions League	QR2 - SF	(Italy) Juventus	–	1-2	–
2026–27	UEFA Women's Champions League	QR2 - 3PPO	(Albania) Apolonia	5-2 (Note: Neutral venue - As part of the second qualifying round mini-tournaments, this match was played at the Stadio La Marmora-Pozzo, in Biella, Italy as part of Juventus' hosting duties)	–	–
2026–27	UEFA Women's Europa Cup	QR1	(Ukraine) Kolos Kovalivka	6-1	3-1 (Note: Played at the Stal Stalowa Wola Stadium, Stalowa Wola, Poland due to the ongoing conflict in Ukraine.)	9-2
2026–27	UEFA Women's Europa Cup	QR2	(Ukraine) FC Kharkiv	4-1	2-1 (Note: Played at the Stadionul Zimbru-2, Chișinău, Moldova due to the ongoing conflict in Ukraine.)	6-2
2026–27	UEFA Women's Europa Cup	Ro16	(Czech Republic) Sparta Prague	3-0	2-2	5-2
2026–27	UEFA Women's Europa Cup	QF	(Norway) Brann			

== Performance ==
SCU Torreense (women) season-by-season summary
Season	Tier	League	Pos.	P	W	D	L	GF	GA	GD	Pts.	Cup	Cup II	Other
2018-19	2	II Divisão Série D	7	16	4	2	10	18	65	-47	14	R1	TFP - GS (R1)	–
2019-20 (Note: The season was cut short due to the COVID-19 pandemic in Portugal, on the 2nd matchday of the promotion phase)	2	II Divisão Série F	1	12	11	1	0	129	8	121	34	1/8	–	–
2019-20	2	II Divisão F.Subida South	1	2	2	0	0	7	1	+6	6	1/8	–	–
2020-21	1	Liga BPI Série Sul	4	9	4	3	2	19	16	+3	15	(R3) (Note: The tournament was cancelled by the third round)	TLF - QF	–
2020-21	1	Liga BPI; Championship Phase	7	14	3	1	10	15	48	-33	10	(R3)	TLF - QF	–
2021-22	1	Liga BPI Série Sul	3	7	3	3	1	14	6	+8	12	R3	TLF - QF	–
2021-22	1	Liga BPI; Championship Phase	6	14	4	3	7	14	21	-8	15	R3	TLF - QF	–
2022-23	1	Liga BPI	7	22	6	4	12	25	47	-22	22	R3	TLF - R1	–
2023-24	1	Liga BPI	8	22	8	6	8	33	39	-6	30	R4	TLF - R1	–
2024-25	1	Liga BPI	4	22	13	2	7	46	22	+24	41	W	TLF - SF	–
2025-26	1	Liga BPI	3	18	10	2	6	29	22	+6	32	QF	TLF - W	SPF - W
2026-27	1	Liga BPI	Current season											UWCL - QR2; UWEC - TBD

Source: FPF Centro de Resultados, UEFA, RSSSF
