= Racing Power FC =

- Full name: Racing Power Football Club
- Founded: 2020
- Ground: Seixal, Portugal
- President: Nuno Painço
- League: Campeonato Nacional Feminino
- 2025–26: 7th
- Website: https://racingpowerfc.pt/

Racing Power Football Club is a Portuguese women's football club based in Seixal.

The team was founded in 2020, entering the Campeonato Nacional III Divisão Feminino the following year. Within three years, the team achieved promotion to the top-flight Campeonato Nacional Feminino.

== History ==
The team's origins date to 2019, when Ismael Duarte, CEO of RPower Energy Drink and father of Paio Pires player Mariana Duarte, wanted his daughter to be able to continue her football career. He was joined by Nuno Painço, future president of Racing Power and the father of Benfica B player Beatriz Painço, and Pedro Sebastião, future vice president of the club and father of Racing player Beatriz Sebastião. The following year, the team was created by splitting from Paio Pires FC and with the sponsorship of RPower Energy Drink. Exclusively a women's club, it had ambitions early on reach the top division of Portuguese football.

Debuting in the Campeonato Nacional III Divisão Feminino, the team moved up to the Campeonato Nacional II Divisão Feminino in its debut season. It was built up over the following years, adding under-17 and under-19 sides, and won promotion to the top division after the 2022–23 season. Now coached by João Marques, the team reached the final of the 2023–24 Taça de Portugal Feminina, losing 4–1 to Benfica..

== Players ==
=== Current squad ===
As of 10 July 2026

Note: Flags indicate national team as defined under FIFA eligibility rules; some limited exceptions apply. Players may hold more than one non-FIFA nationality.

No.	Pos.	Nation	Player
1	GK	POR	Ana Oliveira
2	FW	USA	Maliah Morris
3	DF	POR	Raquel Infante
5	DF	POR	Bárbara Azevedo
7	MF	POR	Vanessa Marques
8	MF	POR	Catarina Ferreira
13	FW	NGR	Mercy Idoko
15	DF	POR	Ana Assucena
17	DF	POR	Taina Rodrigues
18	FW	POR	Carolina Mendes
21	MF	NED	Gerda Konst
22	DF	USA	Ashley Barron

No.	Pos.	Nation	Player
25	DF	POR	Beatriz Rodrigues
26	DF	POR	Ana Nogueira
28	DF	POR	Joana Pinheiro
29	FW	CMR	Doly Djiatio
31	DF	PUR	Mirianée Hernández
38	FW	POR	Marta Ferreira
46	GK	CMR	Michaely Bihina
57	FW	POR	Inês Gonçalves
78	DF	FRA	Bénédicte Simon
—	MF	GER	Rieke Dieckmann
—	DF	POL	Alexis Legowski
—	DF	AUS	Matilda McNamara
