= Vitória S.C. (women) =

Association football club

Vitória de Guimarães
- Full name: Vitória Sport Clube
- Nicknames: As Conquistadoras (The Conquerors); As Vimaranenses (The ones from Guimarães)
- Founded: 12 October 2018; 7 years ago
- Ground: Academia Vitória SC
- Capacity: 2,500
- Chairman: Rui Rodrigues
- Manager: Ivo Roque
- League: Campeonato Nacional Feminino
- 2025–26: 6th of 10
- Website: vitoriasc.pt/futebol-feminino/
Home colours	Away colours

Vitória Sport Clube, commonly known as Vitória de Guimarães or just Vitória, is a women's football club based in Guimarães, Portugal. It is the women's football section of Vitória S.C. and it was initially founded in 1989, a project that was short-lived, and was later re-founded in 2018. Since then it has taken six seasons to finally be promoted to the top flight, the Campeonato Nacional Feminino, where they compete after winning the Second Division title in 2025.

The women's team plays its home games at the club's mini stadium, which has a capacity of 2,500 people, at the Vitória S.C. Academy training facilities.

== History ==
The first steps of women's football at Vitória began in 1989, with the team participating for just two seasons in the top flight, which was called the National Women's Football Cup. However, the section didn't succeed and was extinguished at the end of that period.

Later, on 12 October 2018, the former president of Vitória, Júlio Mendes, publicly confirmed the creation of a women's football team, a long-desired reactivation, as well as training levels to start competitively the following season.

Vitória SC entered the Portuguese second division with a team made up mostly of local players who identified with the club. However, following the COVID-19 pandemic, the competition was declared over by the Portuguese Football Federation, without a winner or the application of an up and down system.

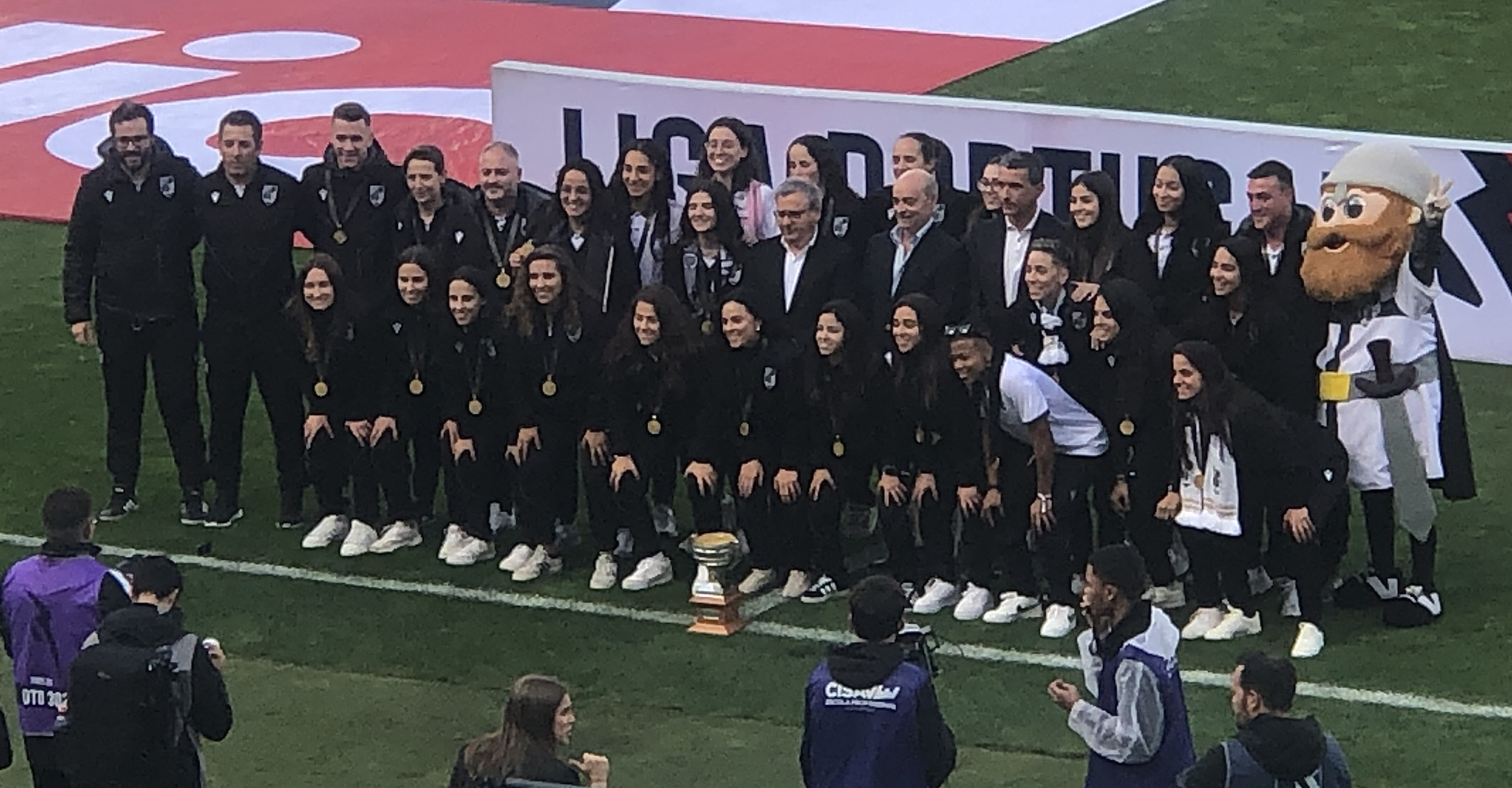
Vitória S.C. women’s team and staff with their Second Division trophy at the Estádio D. Afonso Henriques, May 2025.

Since then, the club has been steadily improving its performances and has always been in the final promotion places, although without any practical effects until the 2023/24 season when they lost 2–8 to Famalicão in the play-off of access to the Women's National Championship.

In the 2024/25 season, the team won the II Division and secured promotion to the Liga BPI, the elite of women's football, for 2025/26 by beating Rio Ave 3-0 in the final round with a full house in attendance.

== Players ==
=== Current squad ===
As of 15 February 2025

Note: Flags indicate national team as defined under FIFA eligibility rules; some limited exceptions apply. Players may hold more than one non-FIFA nationality.

No.	Pos.	Nation	Player
1	GK	POR	Inês Marques
21	GK	POR	Andrea Neves
11	DF	VIR	Naya Vialva
19	DF	POR	Letícia Costa
24	DF	POR	Iara Cavalheiro
2	DF	BRA	Débora Maciel
3	DF	POR	Belinha
6	DF	POR	Naná
31	DF	POR	Kika Silva
15	DF	PHI	Jaime Turrentine
4	DF	POR	Joana Monteiro
20	MF	POR	Beatriz Pinheiro
72	MF	POR	Patrícia Teixeira
8	MF	SVN	Nika Babnik
—	MF	POR	Soraia Gomes

No.	Pos.	Nation	Player
16	MF	POR	Isaura Machado
5	MF	POR	Joana Ribeiro
19	MF	POR	Ana Monteiro
7	MF	POR	Bárbara Martins
13	FW	POR	Cristiana Duarte
17	FW	POR	Ana Veloso
80	FW	POR	Maria Salgado
42	FW	POR	Maria Ribeiro
74	FW	POR	Diana Novais
5	FW	BRA	Laura Pires
9	FW	POR	Inês Lopes
10	FW	POR	Betinha
25	FW	CPV	Irlanda Lopes
—	FW	POR	Maria Neto

== Honours ==
- Campeonato Nacional II Divisão

Winners (1): 2024–25
