= Campo da Imaculada Conceição =

Football stadium in Funchal, Portugal

- Interactive map of Campo da Imaculada Conceição
- Full name: Campo da Imaculada Conceição
- Location: Rua Campo do Marítimo; 9020-208 Funchal; Madeira, Portugal
- Coordinates: 32.670966°N 16.936198°W
- Owner: Club Sport Marítimo
- Capacity: 1,824
- Surface: Grass
- Field size: 100 x 63 metres

Construction
- Opened: 1966
- Renovated: 2001
- Architect: 32°40'15.5"N 16°56'10.3"W

Tenants
- C.S. Marítimo (women); C.S. Marítimo B C.S. Marítimo C C.S. Marítimo Juniors

Campo da Imaculada Conceição is a football stadium in Funchal, Portugal. It is currently used for football matches and has a capacity for 1,824 people. The stadium is owned by C.S. Marítimo and forms part of the Complexo Desportivo do Marítimo training facility. The stadium is the home venue of Marítimo's reserve team, Marítimo B as well as the youth teams, and of women´s football.

== History ==
The stadium opened in 1966, and was constructed using funds raised by Marítimo's fans who had purchased the land in 1958. The stadium received a facelift in the 1980s and again in 2001 when the land adjacent to the site was used to construct the Complexo Desportivo do Marítimo training facility.

=== First team matches ===
The following first team matches were held in the stadium, when the Estádio dos Barreiros was unavailable.

#	Date	Score	Opponent	Competition
1.	6 May 1990	3–1	Boavista	Primeira Divisão
2.	16 May 1992	1–0	Torreense	Primeira Divisão
3.	2 September 2000	1–0	Gil Vicente	Primeira Liga (Note: The match was moved due to issues with the Barreiros pitch, which was affected by fungus after renovation work)

== See also ==
- Estádio dos Barreiros
- Marítimo
