= C.S. Marítimo (women) =

Portuguese football club

Marítimo
- Full name: Club Sport Marítimo
- Nicknames: Os Verde-Rubros (The Green-and-Red); Os Leões (The Lions)
- Founded: 2014
- Ground: Campo do Adelino Rodrigues, Funchal
- Capacity: 2,000
- Chairman: Rui Fontes
- Manager: Luis Gabriel
- League: Campeonato Nacional Feminino
- 2025–26: 9th, Campeonato Nacional Feminino
- Website: http://www.csmaritimo.org.pt/
Home colours	Away colours	Third colours

Club Sport Marítimo Feminino, commonly known as Marítimo or Marítimo da Madeira, is a Portuguese women's football team from Funchal, Madeira. They are the women's section of Club Sport Marítimo and currently compete in the top-level Campeonato Nacional Feminino after being promoted in 2018 by winning the Campeonato Nacional II Divisão Feminino.

== Players ==
=== Current squad ===
As of 22 May 2025

Note: Flags indicate national team as defined under FIFA eligibility rules; some limited exceptions apply. Players may hold more than one non-FIFA nationality.

No.	Pos.	Nation	Player
1	GK	POR	Carolina Rodrigues
2	DF	USA	Jenna Holtz
3	DF	GER	Sade Henrichs
4	MF	USA	Shelby High
5	DF	POR	Joana Silva
6	DF	POR	Paula Fernandes
7	MF	POR	Telma Pereira
8	MF	NZL	Jana Radosavljevic
9	FW	USA	Sofia Lewis
11	FW	ESP	Sara Bermell
12	FW	POR	Érica Costa
13	MF	POR	Inês Freitas
14	DF	POR	Catherine Abreu
15	DF	POR	Diana Freitas

No.	Pos.	Nation	Player
18	FW	POR	Daniella Serrão
19	DF	POR	Carla Gonçalves
20	MF	POR	Lara Costa
21	FW	POR	Sara Ferreira
22	FW	POR	Carolina Ferreira
24	MF	POR	Carlota Jardim
25	FW	GNB	Fatumata Sissé
26	MF	POR	Carolina Nunes
27	MF	POR	Bruna Aguiar
29	DF	POR	Lara Pestana
30	GK	POR	Bárbara Santos
32	GK	NED	Nicole Panis
33	FW	POR	Sara Nóbrega
34	DF	POR	Catarina Silva

== Honours ==
- Campeonato Nacional II Divisão Feminino

Winners: 2018

== Season statistics ==
Season	Division	Pos	Pld	W	D	L	GF	GA	Pts	Top league scorer	Goals	Taça de Portugal	Taça da Liga
2018–19	Campeonato Nacional Feminino	6	22	8	5	9	35	40	29	(Portugal) Érica Costa	12	R3	-
2019–20	Campeonato Nacional Feminino	6	14	7	0	7	22	28	21	(Portugal) Érica Costa	9	R3	-
2020–21	Campeonato Nacional Feminino	6	23	10	1	12	40	37	31	(Portugal) Telma Encarnação	17	R3	QF
2021–22	Campeonato Nacional Feminino	5	21	10	2	9	37	42	32	(Portugal) Telma Encarnação	18	QF	QF
2022–23	Campeonato Nacional Feminino	-	-	-	-	-	-	-	-			R4	R1

- Last updated: 1 April 2023
- Division = Division; Pos = Position in League; Pld = Played; W = Won; D = Drawn; L = Lost; GF = Goals for; GA = Goals against; Pts = Points
- R5 = Fifth round R4 = Fourth round; R3 = Third round; R2 = Second round; R1 = First round; PO = Play-off; GS = Group stage; R64 = Round of 64; R32 = Round of 32; R16 = Round of 16; QF = Quarter-finals; SF = Semi-finals; RU = Runners-up; W = Winners
