= S.L. Benfica (women) =

Portuguese women's association football team

Benfica
- Full name: Sport Lisboa e Benfica
- Nicknames: As Águias (The Eagles); As Encarnadas (The Reds)
- Founded: 12 December 2017 (8 years ago)
- Ground: Benfica Campus; Estádio da Luz (selected matches)
- Capacity: 2,644; 68,100
- President: Rui Costa
- Head coach: Ivan Baptista
- League: Campeonato Nacional Feminino
- 2025–26: Campeonato Nacional Feminino, 1st of 10 (champions)
- Website: www.slbenfica.pt
Home colours	Away colours	Third colours

Sport Lisboa e Benfica (Portuguese pronunciation: [sɨˈpɔɾ liʒˈβoɐ i βɐ̃jˈfikɐ]), commonly known as Benfica, is a Portuguese women's football team based in Lisbon that plays in the Campeonato Nacional Feminino, the top-level women's football league in Portugal, following promotion in the 2018–19 season.

Founded on 12 December 2017, it is the women's team of football club S.L. Benfica. They have won six consecutive First Division titles, one Second Division title, three Portuguese Cup, five League Cups (record) and four Super Cups (record).

Their current home ground is Benfica Campus, in Seixal, with the team occasionally playing at Estádio da Luz in Lisbon.

As of 2025, Benfica have won every league title since they arrived at the Portuguese top flight in 2019, with the exception of the 2019–20 season, when the league was suspended due to COVID-19 restrictions. At the time of suspension, the team was tied for first place.

== History ==
On 12 December 2017, Benfica publicly confirmed that it was forming a long-mooted women's football team. Compiling a squad replete with several international players and a distinctly Brazilian flavour, they entered the Portuguese second division and promptly doled out several comprehensive thrashings to their outmatched opponents.

The initial squad contained a total of seven players from Brazil (an eighth, Rilany, arrived in December). Brazilians were targeted because many had the required skills and experience. As Lusophones, they were also expected to adapt quickly to Portuguese culture. This mirrored the policy of Benfica's male team, who had a successful policy of importing talented players from the Brazilian transfer market.

On 17 September 2018, Benfica made their league debut in the Campeonato Nacional II Divisão and beat UD Ponte de Frielas 28–0. The result established a new record winning margin in Portuguese senior football, surpassing Sporting CP's 21–0 win over CS Mindelense in 1971. Former Benfica player Luís Andrade was appointed as technical co-ordinator of the club's women's section in October 2018. He was tasked with developing a women's B team and revamping the youth structure, which contained approximately 200 players.

On 26 January 2019, Benfica broke their own Portuguese scoring record by thrashing CP Pego 32–0 at the Estádio da Tapadinha, increasing their league tally to 257 goals scored and none conceded in 14 matches, and the overall tally to 293–0 in 16 matches. Four days later, Benfica conceded a goal for the first time in their history, in a 5–1 away win over Marítimo in the third round of the Portuguese Cup.

Campeonato Nacional side Braga inflicted Benfica's first ever defeat on 24 March 2019, winning 2–1 away in the first leg of the Portuguese Cup semi-final. Six days later, Benfica met Sporting CP in the first but unofficial female Lisbon derby between their main teams. The match was staged at the Estádio do Restelo to raise money for the Cyclone Idai relief effort in Mozambique, attracting 15,204 spectators – a national record crowd at the time for a women's match in Portugal. Despite dominating play, Benfica lost 1–0 to Joana Marchão's 86th-minute penalty kick.

On 18 May 2019, after eliminating Braga on 5–4 aggregate in the Portuguese Cup semi-finals, Benfica beat Valadares Gaia 4–0 in the final to conquer their first trophy, in a Portuguese Cup record attendance of 12,632. Following an 8–0 win over Estoril Praia B on 29 May, Benfica secured promotion to the 2019–20 Campeonato Nacional Feminino. Later, on 23 June, they were crowned second division champions as they beat Braga B on 9–0 aggregate in the finals.

After the departure of head coach João Marques, Luís Andrade took his position, and Benfica started their second season by beating Portuguese champions Braga 1–0 with a goal from Pauleta to conquer their first Super Cup trophy. A week later, Benfica debuted in the first division with a 24–0 thrashing of A-dos-Francos. On 19 October, Benfica beat Sporting 3–0 at the Estádio da Luz in the first official derby between both sides, played before 12,812 spectators, who set a new attendance record for a women's match in Portugal.

Benfica qualified to UEFA Women's Champions League's group stage for the first time after beating Twente 4–0 on 9 September 2021 (5–1 on aggregate). Benfica made their debut in the competition with a goalless home draw against Bayern Munich on 5 October. On 17 November, Benfica secured their first victory in the group stage, 2–1 at BK Häcken FF, while scoring their first goal.

In the 2023–24 season, Benfica set a Portuguese record by winning all four domestic competitions: the Supertaça de Portugal, the Taça da Liga, the Campeonato Nacional, and the Taça de Portugal. Additionally, Benfica reached the quarter-finals of the UEFA Women's Champions League, where they were eliminated by Olympique Lyon. This marked the first time a Portuguese team was amongst the final eight teams in the competition.

The 2024–25 season did not start with the same level of success. Benfica lost the Supertaça de Portugal (Portuguese Supercup) to their rivals Sporting, on an unprecedent win by a team that had neither won the league nor made it to the cup final in the previous season. Moreover, Benfica failed to qualify to the UEFA Women's Champions League Group stage, after a surprising 0–2 loss at home saw them losing 3–2 on aggregate against Hammarby in the final qualifying round. However, Benfica managed to pick themselves up and went undefeated for most of the remaining season, picking up a women's record fifth League Cup and a fifth consecutive League title (pentacampeonato) in the process. This resulted in Benfica's first undefeated league title, with a record of 20 wins, 2 draws, and 0 losses. The streak ended at the 30th game mark, where Benfica lost 2-1 against SCU Torreense in the Taça de Portugal final, failing to revalidate the title they had won in the previous season.

== Crest and shirt ==
Benfica women's team uses the same crest as the rest of the club. Benfica's crest is composed of an eagle, as a symbol of independence, authority and nobility, positioned atop a shield with red and white colours, symbolizing bravery and peace respectively; the motto "E pluribus unum" ("Out of many, one"), defining union between all members; and the club's initials, "SLB", over a football – all this superimposed on a bicycle wheel representing one of the club's first sports, cycling.

The club has had four main crests since its inception in 1904. The origin of the current crest goes back to 1908, when Sport Lisboa absorbed Grupo Sport Benfica. Afterwards, the shape of the crest was changed in 1930 and 1999. The most significant of the latest changes were the modification and repositioning of the eagle and the reduction of the wheel's size. Seeing as the women's team has been established in 2017, it has always used the latest club crest.

Since the 2008–09 season, Benfica football shirts have displayed three stars above the crest, with each star representing ten league titles won by the men's team. These stars were initially adopted by women's team as well, even though the rationale behind them would not be applicable. Starting in the 2024/2025 season, the stars over the crest were removed from the women's football team's shirt.

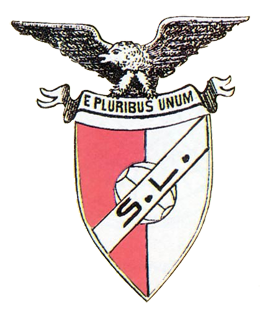
1904–1908
(Sport Lisboa)

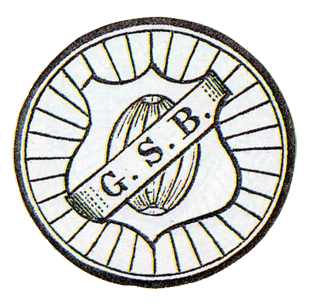
1906–1908
(Grupo Sport Benfica)

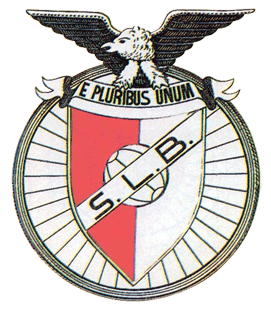
1908–1930

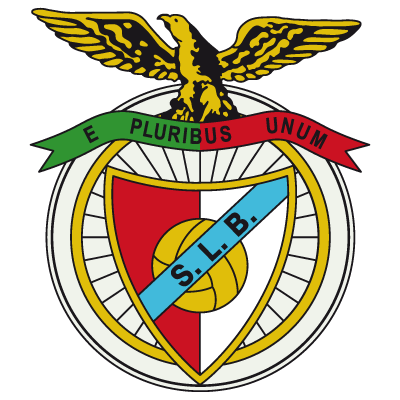
1930–1999

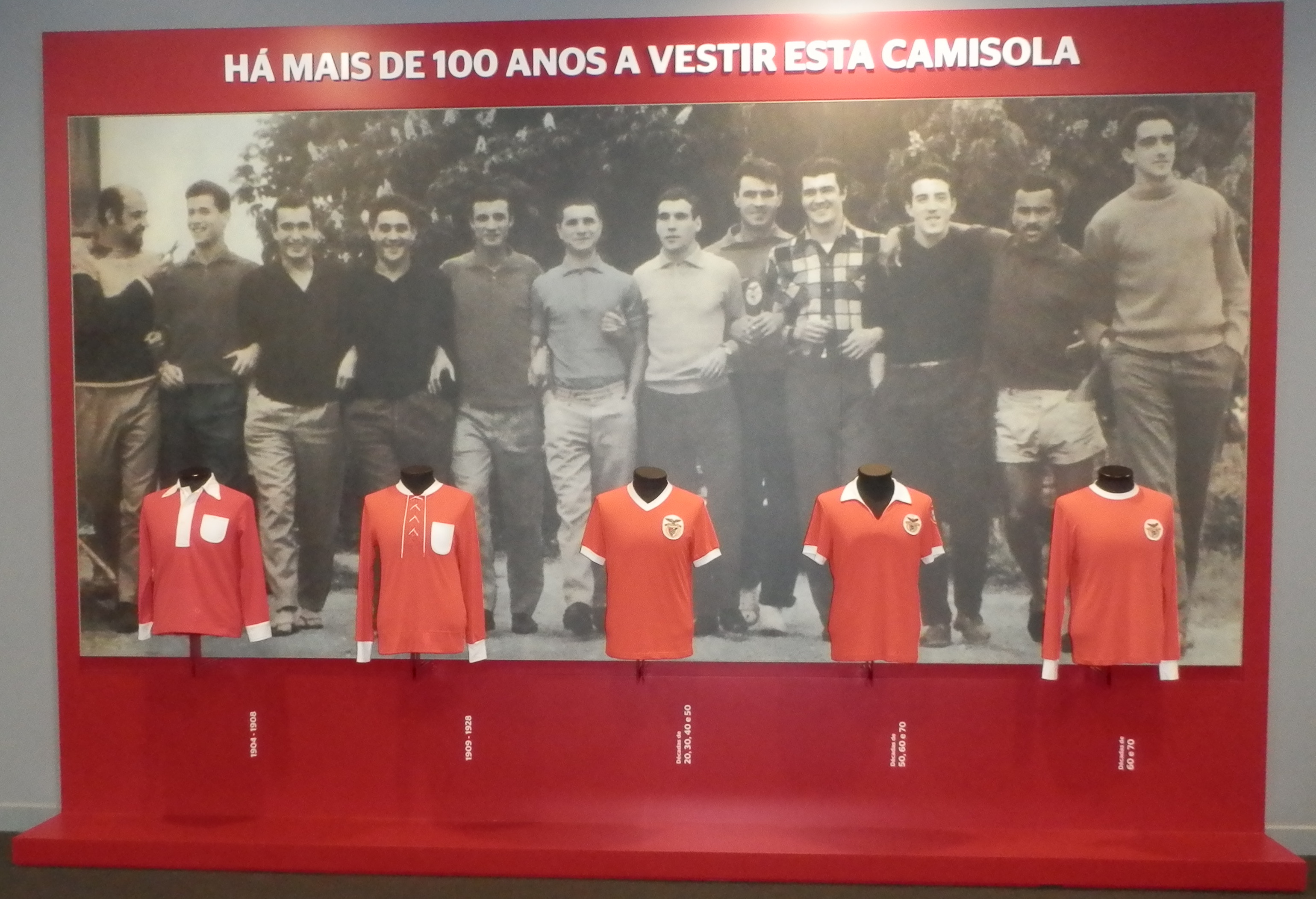
Evolution of the Benfica shirt from 1904 until the 1970s

José da Cruz Viegas was the person responsible for the selection of Benfica's kit in 1904. Red and white colours were chosen for being the ones that stood out better to players' eyes. One year after its inception, the club opted for red shirts with white collars, pockets and cuffs, combined with white shorts and black socks. Benfica's white alternative kit was officially used for the first time in 1944–45, when Salgueiros, who also wore red, were promoted to the first division. The women's team follows this tradition since its inception, and as such, the home shirt has always been primarily red.

Benfica have always worn red shirts; for that reason, in Portugal, Benfica and their supporters (benfiquistas) were nicknamed Vermelhos (Reds). This changed in 1936 with the start of the Spanish Civil War: the Portuguese Estado Novo's Censorship Commission censored the word "vermelhos" because the Popular Front communists in Spain were also known by that name. From then on, Benfica became known as Encarnados – word similar to "reds", but with a different connotation.

== Players ==
=== Current squad ===
As of 27 August 2026

Note: Flags indicate national team as defined under FIFA eligibility rules; some limited exceptions apply. Players may hold more than one non-FIFA nationality.

No.	Pos.	Nation	Player
1	GK	GER	Lena Pauels
3	DF	POR	Inês Meninas
4	DF	USA	Zoe Matthews
5	DF	NOR	Marit Bratberg Lund
6	MF	POR	Beatriz Cameirão
7	FW	NOR	Frøya Dorsin
8	MF	POR	Andreia Norton
9	FW	BRA	Nycole Raysla
10	FW	DEN	Caroline Møller
11	DF	POR	Ana Borges
12	GK	BRA	Thaís Lima
13	FW	POR	Lúcia Alves
14	MF	POR	Letícia Almeida
15	DF	POR	Carole Costa
16	MF	BRA	Clarinha

No.	Pos.	Nation	Player
17	FW	POR	Diana Silva
18	MF	NOR	Rakel Engesvik
19	DF	POR	Catarina Amado
20	FW	POR	Lara Martins
21	MF	ESP	Pauleta
22	DF	POR	Diana Gomes
23	GK	CMR	Michaely Bihina
24	FW	NGR	Janet Akekoromowei
25	FW	CAN	Chandra Davidson
31	MF	CHN	Shao Ziqin
77	FW	POR	Neide Guedes
47	FW	POR	Diana Costa
—	MF	HUN	Anna Csiki

=== Other players under contract ===
Note: Flags indicate national team as defined under FIFA eligibility rules; some limited exceptions apply. Players may hold more than one non-FIFA nationality.

No.	Pos.	Nation	Player
—	DF	POR	Luena Ferreira
—	DF	POR	Carolina Simões
—	DF	POR	Caetana Vicente
—	DF	SLO	Tinkara Testen
—	MF	POR	Sorana Godzsa
—	MF	POR	Matilde Matos

No.	Pos.	Nation	Player
—	MF	POR	Carolina Tristão
—	MF	POR	Joana Valente
—	FW	POR	Cristina Fernandes
—	FW	POR	Mélanie Florentino
—	FW	POR	Érica Silva

=== Out on loan ===
Note: Flags indicate national team as defined under FIFA eligibility rules; some limited exceptions apply. Players may hold more than one non-FIFA nationality.

No.	Pos.	Nation	Player
—	DF	POR	Daniela Areia (at Valadares Gaia)
—	DF	POR	Carolina Ferreira (at Valadares Gaia)
—	DF	POR	Inês Meninas (at Valadares Gaia)
—	DF	FRA	Salomé Prat (on loan (Spain) Dux Logroño)
—	FW	POR	Diana Costa (on loan (Portugal) Racing Power FC)

== Coaching staff ==
Position	Name
Head coach	Ivan Baptista
Assistant coaches	André Vale; Pedro Carneiro
Goalkeeping coach	Pedro Espinha
Video analyst	Mauro Rodrigues

Last updated: 12 August 2025

== Records and statistics ==
=== Competition record ===
Benfica's performance over their completed seasons:

Season	League	Pos	Pld	W	D	L	GF	GA	Top league scorer	Goals	Top overall scorer	Goals	TP	TL	ST	UCL	References
2018–19	2D	1st	20	18	1	0	365	31	Darlene	80	Darlene	109	W	—	—	—	
2019–20	1D	1st	15	14	0	1	101	4	Cloé Lacasse	23	Cloé Lacasse	25	RU	W	W	—	
2020–21	1D	1st	23	21	0	2	81	15	Cloé Lacasse	16	Cloé Lacasse	22	—	W	—	R32	
2021–22	1D	1st	40	28	5	7	107	39	Cloé Lacasse	11	Cloé Lacasse	20	R16	RU	RU	GS	
2022–23	1D	1st	44	37	1	6	177	44	Cloé Lacasse	22	Cloé Lacasse	35	SF	W	W	GS	
2023–24	1D	1st	47	33	9	5	141	41	Kika Nazareth	17	Marie-Yasmine Alidou	26	W	W	W	QF	
2024–25	1D	1st	39	31	5	3	101	26	Cristina Martín-Prieto	19	Cristina Martín-Prieto	30	RU	W	RU	2QR	
2025–26	1D	1st	35	23	6	6	87	32	Carole Costa	10	Carole Costa	11	W	SF	RU	LP	
2026–27	1D	-	-	-	-	-	-	-	-	-	-	-	-	-	W	-	

Key

W = Winners; RU = Runners-up; SF = Semi-finals; QF = Quarter-Finals; R16 = Round of 16; R32 = Round of 32; LP= League Phase; GS = Group stage; 2QR = Second Qualifying Round

=== Managerial statistics ===
As of match played 12 August 2025. Only competitive matches are included.

Name	Nat	From	To	P	W	D	L	GF	GA	Win %	Honours	Refs
João Marques	(Portugal)	8 March 2018	25 June 2019	36	34	1	1	452	6	94.44	Campeonato Nacional II Divisão, Taça de Portugal	
Luís Andrade	(Portugal)	2 July 2019	26 December 2020	35	30	1	4	171	28	85.71	Supertaça de Portugal	
Filipa Patão	(Portugal)	27 December 2020	25 June 2025	180	141	18	21	561	155	78.33	5 Campeonato Nacional, 5 Taça da Liga, 2 Supertaça de Portugal, Taça de Portugal	
Ivan Baptista	(Portugal)	8 July 2025									Campeonato Nacional, Taça de Portugal, Supertaça de Portugal	

== Honours ==
- Campeonato Nacional

Winners (6): 2020–21, 2021–22, 2022–23, 2023–24, 2024–25, 2025–26

- Campeonato Nacional II Divisão

Winners (1): 2018–19

- Taça de Portugal

Winners (3): 2018–19, 2023–24, 2025–26

- Taça da Liga

Winners (5) – record: 2019–20, 2020–21, 2022–23, 2023–24, 2024–25

- Supertaça de Portugal

Winners (4) – record: 2019, 2022, 2023, 2026

Benfica B

- Campeonato Nacional II Divisão

Winners (1): 2023–24

== European Record ==
Note: SL Benfica score is always listed first.

Season	Round	Opponent	Home	Away	Agg.
UEFA Women's Champions League - 2020/2021	1R	(Greece) PAOK	—N/a	3–1	3–1
UEFA Women's Champions League - 2020/2021	2R	(Belgium) Anderlecht	—N/a	2–1	2–1
UEFA Women's Champions League - 2020/2021	R32	(England) Chelsea	0–5	0–3	0–8
UEFA Women's Champions League - 2021/2022	1R - CP	(Israel) Maccabi Kiryat Gat	4–0		4–0
UEFA Women's Champions League - 2021/2022	2R - CP	(Luxembourg) Racing FC	7–0		7–0
UEFA Women's Champions League - 2021/2022	3R	(Netherlands) Twente	4–0	1–1	5–1
UEFA Women's Champions League - 2021/2022	GS	(Germany) Bayern Munich	0–0	0–4	3rd place
UEFA Women's Champions League - 2021/2022	GS	(France) Olympique Lyonnais	0–5	0–5	3rd place
UEFA Women's Champions League - 2021/2022	GS	(Sweden) BK Häcken	0–1	2–1	3rd place
UEFA Women's Champions League - 2022/2023	1R - CP	(Kosovo) Hajvalia	9–0		9–0
UEFA Women's Champions League - 2022/2023	2R - CP	(Netherlands) Twente	2–1		2–1
UEFA Women's Champions League - 2022/2023	3R	(Scotland) Rangers	2–1 (a.e.t.)	3–2	5–3
UEFA Women's Champions League - 2022/2023	GS	(Spain) FC Barcelona	2–6	0–9	3rd place
UEFA Women's Champions League - 2022/2023	GS	(Germany) Bayern Munich	2–3	0–2	3rd place
UEFA Women's Champions League - 2022/2023	GS	(Sweden) FC Rosengård	3–1	1–0	3rd place
UEFA Women's Champions League - 2023/2024	1R - CP	(Northern Ireland) Cliftonville	8–1		8–1
UEFA Women's Champions League - 2023/2024	2R - CP	(Latvia) Rīga	4–0		4–0
UEFA Women's Champions League - 2023/2024	3R	(Cyprus) Apollon Limassol	4–0	7–0	11–0
UEFA Women's Champions League - 2023/2024	GS	(Spain) FC Barcelona	4–4	0–5	2nd place
UEFA Women's Champions League - 2023/2024	GS	(Sweden) FC Rosengård	1–0	2–2	2nd place
UEFA Women's Champions League - 2023/2024	GS	(Germany) Eintracht Frankfurt	1–0	1–1	2nd place
UEFA Women's Champions League - 2023/2024	QF	(France) Olympique Lyonnais	1–2	1–4	2–6
UEFA Women's Champions League - 2024/2025	1R - CP	(Denmark) Nordsjælland	3–1		3–1
UEFA Women's Champions League - 2024/2025	2R - CP	(Bosnia and Herzegovina) FK Sarajevo	4–0		4–0
UEFA Women's Champions League - 2024/2025	3R	(Sweden) Hammarby	0–2	2–1	2–3
UEFA Women's Champions League - 2025/2026	LP	(Italy) Juventus	—N/a	1–2	16th
UEFA Women's Champions League - 2025/2026	LP	(England) Arsenal FC	0–2	—N/a	16th
UEFA Women's Champions League - 2025/2026	LP	(Netherlands) Twente	1–1	—N/a	16th
UEFA Women's Champions League - 2025/2026	LP	(France) Paris FC	—N/a	0–2	16th
UEFA Women's Champions League - 2025/2026	LP	(Spain) FC Barcelona	—N/a	1–3	16th
UEFA Women's Champions League - 2025/2026	LP	(France) Paris Saint-Germain	1–1	—N/a	16th
UEFA Women's Champions League - 2026/2027	LP	(Italy) Juventus	—N/a	2–1	
UEFA Women's Champions League - 2026/2027	LP	(Germany) Bayern Munich	0–3	—N/a	
UEFA Women's Champions League - 2026/2027	LP	(England) Arsenal FC	—N/a	0–3	
UEFA Women's Champions League - 2026/2027	LP	Austria Wien	3–1	—N/a	
UEFA Women's Champions League - 2026/2027	LP	(Italy) AS Roma		—N/a	
UEFA Women's Champions League - 2026/2027	LP	(Denmark) HB Køge	—N/a		

== Sources ==
- Oliveira, Mário Fernando de; Silva, Carlos Rebelo da. História do Sport Lisboa e Benfica (1904–1954) [History of Sport Lisboa e Benfica (1904–1954)] (in Portuguese). Preface by Lieutenant Colonel Ribeiro dos Reis. Lisbon, Portugal.
- Pereira, Luís Miguel (November 2009). Bíblia do Benfica [Benfica Bible] (in Portuguese) (7th ed.). Carcavelos, Portugal: Prime Books. ISBN 978-989-655-005-9.
