= S.C. Braga (women) =

Portuguese women's football team

Braga
- Full name: Sporting Clube de Braga
- Nickname: As Guerreiras do Minho (The Minho Warriors)
- Founded: 2016; 10 years ago
- Ground: Estádio Amélia Morais
- Capacity: 2,500
- Chairman: António Salvador
- Head coach: Marwin Bolz (Germany)
- League: Campeonato Nacional Feminino
- 2025–26: Campeonato Nacional Feminino, 5th
- Website: http://www.scbraga.pt
Home colours	Away colours

Sporting Clube de Braga, commonly known as Sporting de Braga or just Braga, is a Portuguese women's football team from the city of Braga. It is the women's football section of S.C. Braga. SC Braga competes in the Campeonato Nacional Feminino, the top flight of football in Portugal.

== Players ==
=== Current squad ===
As of 4 July 2026

Note: Flags indicate national team as defined under FIFA eligibility rules; some limited exceptions apply. Players may hold more than one non-FIFA nationality.

No.	Pos.	Nation	Player
13	GK	BRA	Aline Lima
12	GK	POR	Íris Esgueirão
3	DF	POL	Katarzyna Konat
5	DF	USA	Leah Lewis
16	DF	POR	Ágata Filipa
17	DF	POR	Mariana Azevedo
20	DF	POR	Madalena Marau
22	DF	POR	Vânia Duarte
32	DF	POR	Mariana Campino
2	MF	POR	Maria Miller
6	MF	USA	Margarida Pinto
14	MF	POR	Dolores Silva

No.	Pos.	Nation	Player
21	MF	POR	Maria Negrão
23	MF	POR	Ana Rute
37	MF	GER	Manjou Wilde
7	FW	POR	Carolina Rocha
8	FW	BRA	Mylena Freitas
9	FW	BRA	Malu Schmidt
10	FW	BRA	Taty Sena
13	FW	CPV	Melany Fortes
15	FW	NED	Zoï van de Ven
18	FW	POR	Daniela Silva
27	FW	CRO	Ana Maria Marković
30	FW	BRA	Sissi
—	MF	FIN	Ria Öling

== Historical record ==
=== Domestic competitions ===
- Campeonato Nacional:

Winners (1): 2018–19

- Taça de Portugal Feminina:

Winners (1): 2019–20

- Taça da Liga

Winners (1): 2021–22

- Supertaça de Portugal:

Winners (1): 2018

=== International Competitions ===
- UEFA Champions League:

Last 32: 2019–20

- UEFA Women's Europa Cup:

Second round: 2025–26

=== UEFA Club Competitions record ===
Season	Competition	Round	Opponent	Home	Away	Agg.
2019–20	UEFA Champions League	Qualifying round	(Austria) SK Sturm Graz	2–0	Matches played at Riga	1st (A)
2019–20	UEFA Champions League	Qualifying round	(Cyprus) Apollon Limassol	1–0	Matches played at Riga	1st (A)
2019–20	UEFA Champions League	Qualifying round	(Latvia) Rīgas FS	8–0	Matches played at Riga	1st (A)
2019–20	UEFA Champions League	L 32	(France) Paris Saint-Germain	0–7	0–0	0–7
2025–26	UEFA Champions League	Qualifying round				
