= Taça da Liga Feminina =

- Organiser(s): Portuguese Football Federation (FPF)
- Founded: 2020; 6 years ago
- Region: Portugal
- Teams: 12
- Current champions: Torreense (1st title)
- Most championships: Benfica (5 titles)
- Broadcaster: SIC (final)
- 2025–26

The Taça da Liga Feminina, known as the Taça da Liga Feminina Placard (lit. 'Placard Women's Taça da Liga') for sponsorship reasons, is the national league cup competition in Portuguese women's football. It began in the 2019–20 season involving the top four teams at the end of the first half of the Campeonato Nacional. It starts in January and feature a round-robin format with each team playing the other only once and the best two playing a final in March.

Torreense are the reigning champions, having defeated Valadares Gaia 1–0 in the final of the 2025–26 season. Benfica have won the most titles, having won the competition five times.

== Format ==
Since the 2019–20 season, the Taça da Liga format is the following:

- First round – One group of four teams, which include the first four teams of the first half of Campeonato Nacional, play in a single round-robin format. The first two qualify for the final phase
- Final phase – Final played as one-legged fixture played in a neutral ground.

== Finals ==
Taça da Liga Feminina Finals
Year	Winners	Score	Runners-up	Date	Venue
2020	Benfica	3–0	Braga	6 January 2021	Estádio Municipal de Aveiro
2021	Benfica	2–1	Sporting CP	17 March 2021	Estádio Dr. Magalhães Pessoa
2022	Braga	0–0 (3–2 p.)	Benfica	23 March 2022	Estádio Marcolino de Castro
2023	Benfica	3–1	Braga	1 April 2023	Estádio Municipal de Aveiro
2024	Benfica	1–0	Sporting CP	1 May 2024	Estádio do Restelo
2025	Benfica	2–1	Sporting CP	9 March 2025	Estádio Dr. Magalhães Pessoa
2026	Torreense	1–0	Valadares Gaia	28 March 2026	Estádio do Fontelo
