= Campeonato Nacional Feminino =

Football league in Portugal

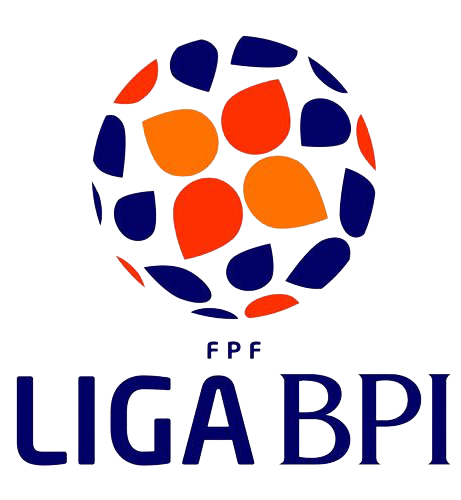
- Organising body: FPF
- Founded: 1993; 33 years ago
- Country: Portugal
- Confederation: UEFA
- Number of clubs: 10 (from 2025–26)
- Level on pyramid: 1
- Relegation to: Campeonato Nacional II Divisão
- Domestic cup(s): Taça de Portugal; Taça da Liga; Supertaça
- International cup: UEFA Champions League
- Current champions: Benfica (6th title) (2025–26)
- Most championships: S.U. 1º de Dezembro (12 titles)
- Top scorer: Diana Silva (113 goals)
- Broadcaster(s): Canal 11; Sport TV; Benfica TV; Sporting TV
- Website: fpf.pt
- Current: 2026–27 season

The Campeonato Nacional Feminino (English: Women's National Championship), also known as Liga BPI for sponsorship reasons, is the top-tier women's association football league in Portugal and part of the various women's football competitions in Portugal. It is run by the Portuguese Football Federation and began in 1993. An initial ten teams compete in the league, which replaced the Taça Nacional as the highest level of women's football in Portugal. The current champions are Benfica, who won their fourth consecutive title in 2023–24. The most successful team is S.U. 1º de Dezembro, with 12 titles.

== History ==
One of the first women's football national championship in Portugal began in 1985, under the title Taça Nacional. It included all clubs interested in participating and comprised two stages, in the first stage clubs were divided in different zone groups with the top clubs from each zone advancing to the second stage to decide the champion. Boavista dominated this competition, winning all its eight editions. The competition was renamed Campeonato Nacional for the 1993–94 season though keeping the same format. On the 1998–99 season, more matches were added to the competition as clubs not advancing to the championship stage played would play again between them. In 2001, the UEFA Women's Cup was created with the previous season winners of this competition qualifying to play on it. The Portuguese cup started on the 2003–04 season with all clubs competing on it.

In 2005, the Campeonato Nacional II Divisão was created, leaving only the top 6 teams on the first tier, each one playing the others 4 times with the bottom team being relegated. The competition was expanded for the 2009–10 season to 10 teams, playing each other twice, with top clubs advancing to a championship group and bottom teams to a relegation group. A supercup, played between the championship winners and cup winners, started in 2015.

For the 2016–17, the Portuguese Football Federation granted direct entrance to the first tier to four Primeira Liga teams, with Sporting CP, Braga, Estoril and CF Os Belenenses taking the spots. This teams had to keep the women's team for at least three seasons and introduce Under-19 sides to promote youth football. This way, Sporting CP and Braga became the first professional women's football teams in Portugal. That same season, the format was reverted to a single stage, where the 14 teams (reduced to 12 on the following season) play each other twice. The league cup was introduced for the 2019–20 season with teams qualifying through mid-season standings on the championship. That season was interrupted due to the COVID-19 pandemic in Portugal with no title awarded and no teams relegated. This was the first time no title was awarded since the creation of the competition. This led to a total of 20 teams on the first tier on the following season, requiring a format change for that season, with a first stage where teams are divided in two groups playing each other once with top teams advancing to a championship group and bottom teams to relegation groups.

== Competition format ==
=== Competition ===
As of 2016–17, there are 12 clubs in the Campeonato Nacional. During the course of a season (from September to May) each club plays the others twice (a double round-robin system), once at their home stadium and once at that of their opponents', for 22 games. Teams receive three points for a win and one point for a draw. No points are awarded for a loss. Teams are ranked by total points, then head-to-head points, head-to-head goal difference, goal difference, matches won, and goals scored. If still equal, a play-off match at a neutral venue decides rank. The two lowest placed teams are relegated into the Campeonato Nacional II Divisão, and the top two teams from the Campeonato Nacional de Promoção are promoted in their place.

=== Qualification for European competitions ===
The winner of Campeonato Nacional qualifies for the UEFA Women's Champions League qualifying round.

== Teams ==
Location of teams in 2023–24 Campeonato Nacional Feminino. (Mainland)
Location of teams in 2022–23 Campeonato Nacional Feminino (Madeira).

10 teams contest the Campeonato Nacional de Futebol Feminino in 2025–26.

=== Stadia and locations ===
Since the 2024/25 season, there has been a major change: as a rule, all games must be played on natural grass, and as a result, several teams have been forced to change venues.

Team	Location	Stadium	Capacity
Benfica	Seixal	Benfica Campus	2,644
Benfica	Lisbon	Estádio da Luz	68,100
Braga	Braga	Estádio Amélia Morais	2,500
Braga	Braga	Estádio 1º de Maio	28,000
Damaiense	Amadora	Estádio Engenheiro Carlos Salema	4,000
Damaiense	Faro	Estádio Algarve	30,305
Marítimo	Funchal	Campo da Imaculada Conceição	1,824
Marítimo	Funchal	Estádio do Marítimo	10,600
Racing Power FC	Oeiras	Estádio Nacional do Jamor	37,593
Rio Ave	Vila do Conde	Estádio do Rio Ave FC	5,300
Sporting CP	Alcochete	CGD Stadium Aurélio Pereira	1,180
Sporting CP	Lisbon	Estádio José Alvalade	52,095
Torreense	Torres Vedras	Estádio Manuel Marques	2,431
Valadares Gaia	Vila Nova de Gaia	Estádio do Canelas	7,000
Vitória de Guimarães	Guimarães	Academia Vitória SC	2,500
Vitória de Guimarães	Guimarães	Estádio D. Afonso Henriques	30,029

== List of champions ==
The following teams won the league:

=== Taça Nacional ===
Season	Champions	Runners-up	Third-place
1985–86	Boavista	Académico de Alvalade	União de Coimbra
1986–87	Boavista (2)		
1987–88	Boavista (3)		
1988–89	Boavista (4)	Costa do Estoril	União de Coimbra
1989–90	Boavista (5)	Costa do Estoril	União de Coimbra
1990–91	Boavista (6)	Costa do Estoril	União Ferreirense
1991–92	Boavista (7)	União Ferreirense	Sporting CP
1992–93	Boavista (8)	9 Abril Trajouce	Sporting CP

=== Campeonato Nacional ===
Season	Champions	Runners-up	Third-place
1993–94	Boavista (9)	9 Abril Trajouce	Lobão
1994–95	Boavista (10)	Lobão	1º de Dezembro
1995–96	Lobão	1º de Dezembro	Boavista
1996–97	Boavista (11)	1º de Dezembro	Lobão
1997–98	Gatões	Boavista	1º de Dezembro
1998–99	Gatões (2)	Boavista	1º de Dezembro
1999–2000	1º de Dezembro	Gatões	Boavista
2000–01	Gatões (3)	1º de Dezembro	Boavista
2001–02	1º de Dezembro (2)	Gatões	Futebol Benfica
2002–03	1º de Dezembro (3)	Futebol Benfica	Boavista
2003–04	1º de Dezembro (4)	Várzea	Futebol Benfica
2004–05	1º de Dezembro (5)	Várzea	Marítimo Murtoense
2005–06	1º de Dezembro (6)	Marítimo Murtoense	Várzea
2006–07	1º de Dezembro (7)	Boavista	Várzea
2007–08	1º de Dezembro (8)	Boavista	Várzea
2008–09	1º de Dezembro (9)	Boavista	Beira-Mar Almada
2009–10	1º de Dezembro (10)	Escola	Clube de Albergaria
2010–11	1º de Dezembro (11)	Cadima	Escola
2011–12	1º de Dezembro (12)	Boavista	Clube de Albergaria
2012–13	Atlético Ouriense	Clube de Albergaria	1º de Dezembro
2013–14	Atlético Ouriense (2)	A-dos-Francos	Futebol Benfica
2014–15	Futebol Benfica	Valadares Gaia	Atlético Ouriense
2015–16	Futebol Benfica (2)	Clube de Albergaria	Valadares Gaia
2016–17	Sporting CP	Braga	Futebol Benfica
2017–18	Sporting CP (2)	Braga	Estoril
2018–19	Braga	Sporting CP	Futebol Benfica
2019–20	abandoned (Note: On 8 April 2020 the Portuguese Football Federation cancelled all non-professional competitions in the country due to the COVID-19 pandemic in Portugal. No titles were awarded, and no teams will be promoted or relegated.) (Note: Benfica was later appointed to the UEFA Champions League qualifying round as table leaders at the time of interruption.)		
2020–21	Benfica	Sporting CP	Braga
2021–22	Benfica (2)	Sporting CP	Braga
2022–23	Benfica (3)	Sporting CP	Braga
2023–24	Benfica (4)	Sporting CP	Racing Power FC
2024–25	Benfica (5)	Sporting CP	Braga
2025–26	Benfica (6)	Sporting CP	Torreense

== Teams by titles ==
=== Performance by club ===
Club	Winners	Runners-up	Winning seasons	Runner-up seasons
1º de Dezembro	12	3	1999–2000, 2001–02, 2002–03, 2003–04, 2004–05, 2005–06, 2006–07, 2007–08, 2008–09, 2009–10, 2010–11, 2011–12	1995–96, 1996–97, 2000–01
Boavista	11	6	1985–86, 1986–87, 1987–88, 1988–89, 1989–90, 1990–91, 1991–92, 1992–93, 1993–94, 1994–95, 1996–97	1997–98, 1998–99, 2006–07, 2007–08, 2008–09, 2011–12
Benfica	6	0	2020–21, 2021–22, 2022–23, 2023–24, 2024–25, 2025–26	—
Gatões	3	2	1997–98, 1998–99, 2000–01	1999–2000, 2001–02
Sporting CP	2	7	2016–17, 2017–18	2018–19, 2020–21, 2021–22, 2022–23, 2023–24, 2024-25, 2025–26
Futebol Benfica	2	1	2014–15, 2015–16	2002–03
Atlético Ouriense	2	0	2012–13, 2013–14	—
Braga	1	2	2018–19	2016–17, 2017–18
Lobão	1	1	1995–96	1994–95
Costa do Estoril	0	3	—	1988–89, 1989–90, 1990–91
9 Abril Trajouce	0	2	—	1992–93, 1993–94
Várzea	0	2	—	2003–04, 2004–05
Clube de Albergaria	0	2	—	2012–13, 2015–16
Académico de Alvalade	0	1	—	1985–86
União Ferreirense	0	1	—	1991–92
Marítimo Murtoense	0	1	—	2005–06
Escola	0	1	—	2009–10
Cadima	0	1	—	2010–11
A-dos-Francos	0	1	—	2013–14
Valadares Gaia	0	1	—	2014–15
