= 2015 Algarve Cup squads =

Lists of the squads for the 2015 Algarve Cup

This article lists the squads for the 2015 Algarve Cup, the 22nd edition of the Algarve Cup. The cup consisted of a series of friendly games, and was held in the Algarve region of Portugal from 4 to 11 March 2015. The twelve national teams involved in the tournament registered a squad of 23 players.

The age listed for each player is as of 4 March 2015, the first day of the tournament. The numbers of caps and goals listed for each player do not include any matches played after the start of tournament. The club listed is the club for which the player last played a competitive match prior to the tournament. The nationality for each club reflects the national association (not the league) to which the club is affiliated. A flag is included for coaches that are of a different nationality than their own national team.

== Group A ==
=== Brazil ===
The squad was announced on 26 February 2015.

Head coach: Vadão

No.	Pos.	Player	Date of birth (age)	Caps	Goals	Club
1	GK	Luciana	24 July 1987 (aged 27)	10	0	(Brazilian Football Confederation) Ferroviária
2	DF	Fabiana	4 August 1989 (aged 25)	54	6	(Brazilian Football Confederation) Centro Olímpico
3	DF	Bruna (captain)	16 October 1985 (aged 29)	38	3	(Brazilian Football Confederation) São José
4	DF	Tayla	9 May 1992 (aged 22)	12	1	(Brazilian Football Confederation) Ferroviária
5	MF	Francielle	18 October 1989 (aged 25)	50	2	(United States Soccer Federation) Boston Breakers
6	MF	Andressa Alves	10 November 1992 (aged 22)	31	6	(United States Soccer Federation) Boston Breakers
7	MF	Maurine	14 January 1986 (aged 29)	53	6	(Brazilian Football Confederation) Ferroviária
8	MF	Thaisa	17 December 1988 (aged 26)	22	2	(Brazilian Football Confederation) Ferroviária
9	FW	Debinha	20 October 1991 (aged 23)	29	11	(Norwegian Football Federation) Avaldsnes
10	MF	Marta	19 February 1986 (aged 29)	87	88	(Swedish Football Association) Rosengård
11	MF	Rosana	7 July 1982 (aged 32)	106	17	(United States Soccer Federation) Houston Dash
12	GK	Letícia	13 August 1994 (aged 20)	0	0	(Brazilian Football Confederation) São José
13	DF	Poliana	6 February 1991 (aged 24)	24	2	(United States Soccer Federation) Houston Dash
14	DF	Érika	4 February 1988 (aged 27)	48	9	(Brazilian Football Confederation) Centro Olímpico
15	DF	Monica	21 April 1987 (aged 27)	5	0	(Brazilian Football Confederation) Ferroviária
16	DF	Tamires	10 October 1987 (aged 27)	26	3	(Brazilian Football Confederation) Centro Olímpico
17	MF	Andressinha	1 May 1995 (aged 19)	11	1	(Brazilian Football Confederation) Kindermann
18	MF	Raquel	21 March 1991 (aged 23)	16	3	(Brazilian Football Confederation) Ferroviária
19	MF	Gabi Zanotti	28 February 1985 (aged 30)	16	2	(Brazilian Football Confederation) Centro Olímpico
20	MF	Formiga	3 March 1978 (aged 37)	126	18	(Brazilian Football Confederation) São José
21	FW	Bia	17 December 1993 (aged 21)	11	0	(Korea Football Association) Hyundai Steel Red Angels
22	FW	Darlene	11 January 1990 (aged 25)	18	4	(Brazilian Football Confederation) Kindermann
23	GK	Andréia	14 September 1977 (aged 37)	101	0	(Brazilian Football Confederation) Portuguesa

=== China ===
Head coach: Hao Wei

No.	Pos.	Player	Date of birth (age)	Caps	Goals	Club
1	GK	Zhang Yue	30 September 1990 (aged 24)			(Chinese Football Association) Beijing Phoenix
2	DF	Liu Shanshan	16 March 1992 (aged 22)			(Chinese Football Association) Hebei Zhongji
3	DF	Wang Shanshan	27 January 1990 (aged 25)			(Chinese Football Association) Tianjin Huisen
4	DF	Li Jiayue	8 June 1990 (aged 24)			(Chinese Football Association) Shanghai Guotai Junan
5	DF	Wu Haiyan (captain)	26 February 1993 (aged 22)			(Chinese Football Association) Shandong Xiangshang
6	DF	Li Dongna	6 December 1988 (aged 26)			(Korea Football Association) Suwon FMC
7	MF	Xu Yanlu	16 September 1991 (aged 23)			(Chinese Football Association) Jiangsu Huatai
8	FW	Ma Jun	6 March 1989 (aged 25)			(Korea Football Association) Daejeon Sportstoto
10	MF	Li Ying	7 January 1993 (aged 22)			(Chinese Football Association) Shandong Xiangshang
11	FW	Yang Li	31 January 1991 (aged 24)			(Chinese Football Association) Jiangsu Huatai
12	GK	Wang Fei	22 March 1990 (aged 24)			(German Football Association) Turbine Potsdam
13	MF	Gao Qi	21 August 1991 (aged 23)			(Chinese Football Association) Guangdong R&F
14	FW	Zhao Rong	2 August 1991 (aged 23)			(Chinese Football Association) Beijing Phoenix
16	MF	Lei Jiahui	22 September 1995 (aged 19)			(Chinese Football Association) Henan
17	MF	Gu Yasha	28 November 1990 (aged 24)			(Chinese Football Association) Beijing Phoenix
18	MF	Han Peng	20 December 1989 (aged 25)			(Chinese Football Association) Tianjin Huisen
19	MF	Tan Ruyin	17 July 1994 (aged 20)			(Chinese Football Association) Guangdong R&F
21	MF	Wang Lisi	28 November 1991 (aged 23)			(Chinese Football Association) Jiangsu Huatai
23	MF	Ren Guixin	19 December 1988 (aged 26)			(Chinese Football Association) Changchun Dazhong Zhuoyue
24	MF	Tang Jiali	16 March 1995 (aged 19)			(Chinese Football Association) Shanghai Guotai Junan
25	MF	Zhang Rui	21 August 1991 (aged 23)			(Chinese Football Association) Bayi

=== Germany ===
The squad was announced on 23 February 2015.

No.	Pos.	Player	Date of birth (age)	Caps	Goals	Club
1	GK	Nadine Angerer (captain)	10 November 1978 (aged 36)	136	0	(United States Soccer Federation) Portland Thorns
2	DF	Tabea Kemme	14 December 1991 (aged 23)	9	0	(German Football Association) Turbine Potsdam
3	DF	Margarita Gidion	18 December 1994 (aged 20)	0	0	(German Football Association) SGS Essen
4	DF	Leonie Maier	29 September 1992 (aged 22)	22	3	(German Football Association) Bayern Munich
5	DF	Annike Krahn	1 July 1985 (aged 29)	111	5	(French Football Federation) Paris Saint-Germain
6	MF	Simone Laudehr	12 July 1986 (aged 28)	82	21	(German Football Association) FFC Frankfurt
7	FW	Anna Blässe	27 February 1987 (aged 28)	0	0	(German Football Association) VfL Wolfsburg
8	FW	Lena Petermann	5 February 1994 (aged 21)	0	0	(German Football Association) SC Freiburg
10	MF	Dzsenifer Marozsán	18 April 1992 (aged 22)	42	20	(German Football Association) FFC Frankfurt
11	FW	Anja Mittag	16 May 1985 (aged 29)	114	31	(Swedish Football Association) Rosengård
12	GK	Almuth Schult	9 February 1991 (aged 24)	17	0	(German Football Association) VfL Wolfsburg
13	FW	Célia Šašić	27 June 1988 (aged 26)	99	55	(German Football Association) FFC Frankfurt
14	DF	Babett Peter	12 May 1988 (aged 26)	84	4	(German Football Association) VfL Wolfsburg
15	DF	Kathrin Hendrich	6 April 1992 (aged 22)	6	0	(German Football Association) FFC Frankfurt
16	MF	Melanie Leupolz	14 April 1994 (aged 20)	22	4	(German Football Association) Bayern Munich
17	DF	Jennifer Cramer	24 February 1993 (aged 22)	15	0	(German Football Association) Turbine Potsdam
18	MF	Alexandra Popp	6 April 1991 (aged 23)	48	24	(German Football Association) VfL Wolfsburg
19	MF	Fatmire Alushi	1 April 1988 (aged 26)	75	18	(French Football Federation) Paris Saint-Germain
20	MF	Lena Goeßling	8 March 1986 (aged 28)	68	8	(German Football Association) VfL Wolfsburg
21	GK	Laura Benkarth	14 October 1992 (aged 22)	0	0	(German Football Association) SC Freiburg
22	DF	Luisa Wensing	8 February 1993 (aged 22)	20	1	(German Football Association) VfL Wolfsburg
23	MF	Verena Faißt	22 May 1989 (aged 25)	24	2	(German Football Association) VfL Wolfsburg
25	MF	Sara Däbritz	15 February 1995 (aged 20)	11	0	(German Football Association) SC Freiburg

=== Sweden ===
The squad was announced on 18 February 2015.

Head coach: Pia Sundhage

No.	Pos.	Player	Date of birth (age)	Caps	Goals	Club
1	GK	Hedvig Lindahl	29 April 1983 (aged 31)	103	0	(The Football Association) Chelsea
2	DF	Charlotte Rohlin	2 December 1980 (aged 34)	74	7	(Swedish Football Association) Linköping
3	DF	Linda Sembrant	15 May 1987 (aged 27)	51	4	(French Football Federation) Montpellier
4	DF	Emma Berglund	19 December 1988 (aged 26)	31	0	(Swedish Football Association) Rosengård
5	DF	Nilla Fischer	2 August 1984 (aged 30)	125	19	(German Football Association) VfL Wolfsburg
6	DF	Sara Thunebro	26 April 1979 (aged 35)	128	5	(Swedish Football Association) Eskilstuna United
7	MF	Lisa Dahlkvist	6 February 1987 (aged 28)	91	9	(Swedish Football Association) Örebro
8	FW	Lotta Schelin	27 February 1984 (aged 31)	145	76	(French Football Federation) Lyon
9	FW	Kosovare Asllani	29 July 1989 (aged 25)	70	20	(French Football Federation) Paris Saint-Germain
10	FW	Sofia Jakobsson	23 April 1990 (aged 24)	50	6	(French Football Federation) Montpellier
11	FW	Jenny Hjohlman	13 February 1990 (aged 25)	9	1	(Swedish Football Association) Umeå
12	GK	Hilda Carlén	13 August 1991 (aged 23)	1	0	(Swedish Football Association) Piteå
13	MF	Malin Diaz	3 January 1994 (aged 21)	10	0	(Swedish Football Association) Eskilstuna United
14	MF	Hanna Folkesson	15 June 1988 (aged 26)	20	0	(Swedish Football Association) Örebro
15	MF	Therese Sjögran	8 April 1977 (aged 37)	204	21	(Swedish Football Association) Rosengård
16	DF	Lina Nilsson	17 June 1987 (aged 27)	58	3	(Swedish Football Association) Rosengård
17	MF	Caroline Seger (captain)	19 March 1985 (aged 29)	131	18	(French Football Federation) Paris Saint-Germain
18	DF	Jessica Samuelsson	30 January 1993 (aged 22)	18	0	(Swedish Football Association) Linköping
19	MF	Antonia Göransson	16 September 1990 (aged 24)	49	8	(Swedish Football Association) Vittsjö
20	FW	Marija Banušić	17 September 1995 (aged 19)	2	0	(The Football Association) Chelsea
21	GK	Carola Söberg	29 July 1982 (aged 32)	8	0	(Swedish Football Association) Örebro
22	MF	Olivia Schough	11 March 1991 (aged 23)	20	1	(Swedish Football Association) Eskilstuna United
23	MF	Elin Rubensson	11 May 1993 (aged 21)	14	0	(Swedish Football Association) Kopparbergs/Göteborg

== Group B ==
=== Iceland ===
The squad was announced on 23 February 2015.

Head coach: Freyr Alexandersson

No.	Pos.	Player	Date of birth (age)	Caps	Goals	Club
1	GK	Sandra Sigurðardóttir	2 October 1986 (aged 28)	8	0	(Football Association of Iceland) Stjarnan
2	DF	Anna María Baldursdóttir	28 August 1994 (aged 20)	4	0	(Football Association of Iceland) Stjarnan
3	DF	Lára Kristín Pedersen	23 May 1993 (aged 21)	0	0	(Football Association of Iceland) Stjarnan
4	DF	Glódís Perla Viggósdóttir	27 June 1995 (aged 19)	25	1	(Swedish Football Association) Eskilstuna United
5	DF	Arna Ásgrímsdóttir	12 August 1992 (aged 22)	2	1	(Football Association of Iceland) Þór/KA
6	FW	Hólmfríður Magnúsdóttir	20 September 1984 (aged 30)	93	33	(Norwegian Football Federation) Avaldsnes
7	MF	Sara Björk Gunnarsdóttir (captain)	29 September 1990 (aged 24)	78	16	(Swedish Football Association) Rosengård
8	MF	Katrín Ómarsdóttir	27 June 1987 (aged 27)	64	10	(The Football Association) Liverpool
9	FW	Margrét Lára Viðarsdóttir	25 July 1986 (aged 28)	94	71	(Swedish Football Association) Kristianstads
10	MF	Dagný Brynjarsdóttir	10 August 1991 (aged 23)	48	11	(German Football Association) Bayern Munich
11	MF	Hallbera Guðný Gísladóttir	14 September 1986 (aged 28)	57	1	(Football Association of Iceland) Breiðablik
12	GK	Sonný Lára Þráinsdóttir	9 December 1986 (aged 28)	0	0	(Football Association of Iceland) Breiðablik
13	GK	Guðbjörg Gunnarsdóttir	18 May 1985 (aged 29)	31	0	(Norwegian Football Federation) Lillestrøm
14	MF	Gunnhildur Yrsa Jónsdóttir	28 September 1988 (aged 26)	13	0	(Norwegian Football Federation) Stabæk
15	DF	Anna Björk Kristjánsdóttir	14 October 1989 (aged 25)	9	0	(Football Association of Iceland) Stjarnan
16	FW	Harpa Þorsteinsdóttir	27 June 1986 (aged 28)	46	8	(Football Association of Iceland) Stjarnan
17	MF	Ásgerður Baldursdóttir	5 October 1987 (aged 27)	4	0	(Football Association of Iceland) Stjarnan
18	MF	Guðný Björk Óðinsdóttir	27 September 1988 (aged 26)	35	0	(Swedish Football Association) Eskilstuna United
19	FW	Elín Metta Jensen	1 March 1995 (aged 20)	11	2	(Football Association of Iceland) Valur
20	DF	Elísa Viðarsdóttir	26 May 1991 (aged 23)	17	0	(Swedish Football Association) Kristianstads
21	FW	Fanndís Friðriksdóttir	9 May 1990 (aged 24)	55	5	(Football Association of Iceland) Breiðablik
22	MF	Rakel Hönnudóttir	30 December 1988 (aged 26)	65	5	(Football Association of Iceland) Breiðablik
23	FW	Guðmunda Brynja Óladóttir	3 January 1994 (aged 21)	4	1	(Football Association of Iceland) Selfoss

=== Norway ===
The squad was announced on 16 February 2015.

Head coach: Even Pellerud

No.	Pos.	Player	Date of birth (age)	Caps	Goals	Club
1	GK	Ingrid Hjelmseth	10 April 1980 (aged 34)	89	0	(Norwegian Football Federation) Stabæk
2	DF	Marita Skammelsrud Lund	29 January 1989 (aged 26)	57	2	(Norwegian Football Federation) Lillestrøm
3	FW	Inger Ane Hole	6 February 1987 (aged 28)	3	0	(Norwegian Football Federation) Trondheims-Ørn
4	FW	Melissa Bjånesøy	18 April 1992 (aged 22)	17	3	(Norwegian Football Federation) Stabæk
5	DF	Hedda Strand Gardsjord	28 June 1982 (aged 32)	32	0	(Norwegian Football Federation) Røa
6	DF	Maren Mjelde	6 November 1989 (aged 25)	81	10	(Norwegian Football Federation) Avaldsnes
7	DF	Trine Rønning (captain)	14 June 1982 (aged 32)	150	20	(Norwegian Football Federation) Stabæk
8	MF	Solveig Gulbrandsen	12 January 1981 (aged 34)	174	50	(Norwegian Football Federation) Stabæk
9	FW	Isabell Herlovsen	23 June 1988 (aged 26)	96	40	(Norwegian Football Federation) Lillestrøm
10	DF	Maria Thorisdottir	5 June 1993 (aged 21)	0	0	(Norwegian Football Federation) Klepp
11	FW	Ida Elise Enget	14 June 1989 (aged 25)	11	1	(Norwegian Football Federation) Stabæk
12	GK	Silje Vesterbekkmo	22 June 1983 (aged 31)	6	0	(Norwegian Football Federation) Røa
13	MF	Ingrid Moe Wold	29 January 1990 (aged 25)	8	0	(Norwegian Football Federation) Lillestrøm
14	MF	Gry Tofte Ims	2 March 1986 (aged 29)	36	4	(Norwegian Football Federation) Klepp
15	DF	Anja Sønstevold	21 June 1992 (aged 22)	1	4	(Norwegian Football Federation) Lillestrøm
16	MF	Andrine Hegerberg	6 June 1993 (aged 21)	6	0	(Swedish Football Association) Kopparbergs/Göteborg
17	MF	Lene Mykjåland	20 February 1987 (aged 28)	72	11	(Norwegian Football Federation) Lillestrøm
18	DF	Kristine Minde	6 August 1992 (aged 22)	41	6	(Swedish Football Association) Linköping
19	MF	Marie Dølvik Markussen	15 February 1997 (aged 18)	0	0	(Norwegian Football Federation) Stabæk
20	MF	Emilie Haavi	16 June 1992 (aged 22)	35	7	(Norwegian Football Federation) Lillestrøm
21	FW	Ada Hegerberg	10 July 1995 (aged 19)	28	14	(French Football Federation) Lyon
22	MF	Cathrine Dekkerhus	17 September 1992 (aged 22)	20	0	(Norwegian Football Federation) Stabæk
23	GK	Cecilie Fiskerstrand	20 March 1996 (aged 18)	1	0	(Norwegian Football Federation) Stabæk

=== Switzerland ===
The squad was announced on 24 February 2015.

Head coach: Martina Voss-Tecklenburg

No.	Pos.	Player	Date of birth (age)	Caps	Goals	Club
1	GK	Stenia Michel	23 October 1987 (aged 27)	6	0	(German Football Association) USV Jena
2	DF	Nicole Remund	31 December 1989 (aged 25)	38	2	(Swiss Football Association) Zürich
3	DF	Sandra Betschart	30 March 1989 (aged 25)	63	2	(Swedish Football Association) Sunnanå
4	DF	Rachel Rinast	2 June 1991 (aged 23)	0	0	(German Football Association) 1. FC Köln
5	FW	Noelle Maritz	23 December 1995 (aged 19)	23	1	(German Football Association) VfL Wolfsburg
6	MF	Selina Kuster	8 August 1991 (aged 23)	54	1	(Swiss Football Association) Zürich
7	MF	Martina Moser	9 April 1986 (aged 28)	99	16	(German Football Association) TSG 1899 Hoffenheim
8	MF	Cinzia Zehnder	4 August 1997 (aged 17)	1	0	(Swiss Football Association) Zürich
9	MF	Lia Wälti	19 April 1993 (aged 21)	36	2	(German Football Association) Turbine Potsdam
10	FW	Ramona Bachmann	25 December 1990 (aged 24)	59	32	(Swedish Football Association) Rosengård
11	MF	Lara Dickenmann	27 November 1985 (aged 29)	94	38	(French Football Federation) Lyon
12	GK	Nadine Böni	3 May 1994 (aged 20)	1	0	(Swiss Football Association) Basel
13	FW	Ana-Maria Crnogorčević	3 October 1990 (aged 24)	63	34	(German Football Association) FFC Frankfurt
14	MF	Rahel Kiwic	5 January 1991 (aged 24)	23	2	(German Football Association) MSV Duisburg
15	DF	Caroline Abbé (captain)	13 January 1988 (aged 27)	99	9	(German Football Association) Bayern Munich
16	MF	Fabienne Humm	20 December 1986 (aged 28)	29	8	(Swiss Football Association) Zürich
17	MF	Lara Keller	13 April 1991 (aged 23)	37	0	(German Football Association) USV Jena
18	FW	Vanessa Bürki	1 April 1986 (aged 28)	64	9	(German Football Association) Bayern Munich
19	FW	Eseosa Aigbogun	23 May 1993 (aged 21)	14	2	(Swiss Football Association) Basel
20	MF	Florijana Ismaili	1 January 1995 (aged 20)	5	0	(Swiss Football Association) Young Boys
21	GK	Antonia Albisser	20 February 1987 (aged 28)	1	0	(Swiss Football Association) Luzern
22	MF	Vanessa Bernauer	23 March 1988 (aged 26)	44	2	(German Football Association) VfL Wolfsburg
23	FW	Barla Deplazes	14 November 1995 (aged 19)	0	0	(Swiss Football Association) Zürich

=== United States ===
A 23-player roster was announced 21 February 2015.

No.	Pos.	Player	Date of birth (age)	Caps	Goals	Club
1	GK	Hope Solo	30 July 1981 (aged 33)	162	0	(United States Soccer Federation) Seattle Reign
2	FW	Sydney Leroux	7 May 1990 (aged 24)	64	33	(United States Soccer Federation) Seattle Reign
4	DF	Becky Sauerbrunn	6 June 1985 (aged 29)	73	0	(United States Soccer Federation) Kansas City
5	DF	Kelley O'Hara	4 August 1988 (aged 26)	53	0	(United States Soccer Federation) Sky Blue
6	DF	Whitney Engen	28 November 1987 (aged 27)	25	3	(United States Soccer Federation) Western New York Flash
7	MF	Shannon Boxx	29 June 1977 (aged 37)	186	27	(United States Soccer Federation) Chicago Red Stars
8	FW	Amy Rodriguez	17 February 1987 (aged 28)	117	28	(United States Soccer Federation) Kansas City
9	MF	Heather O'Reilly	2 January 1985 (aged 30)	215	41	(United States Soccer Federation) Kansas City
10	MF	Carli Lloyd	16 July 1982 (aged 32)	187	61	(United States Soccer Federation) Houston Dash
11	DF	Ali Krieger	28 July 1984 (aged 30)	59	1	(United States Soccer Federation) Washington Spirit
12	MF	Lauren Holiday	30 September 1987 (aged 27)	116	23	(United States Soccer Federation) Kansas City
13	FW	Alex Morgan	2 July 1989 (aged 25)	79	50	(United States Soccer Federation) Portland Thorns
14	MF	Morgan Brian	26 February 1993 (aged 22)	21	3	(United States Soccer Federation) Houston Dash
15	MF	Megan Rapinoe	5 July 1985 (aged 29)	96	29	(United States Soccer Federation) Seattle Reign
16	DF	Lori Chalupny	29 January 1984 (aged 31)	96	8	(United States Soccer Federation) Chicago Red Stars
17	MF	Tobin Heath	29 May 1988 (aged 26)	86	11	(United States Soccer Federation) Portland Thorns
19	DF	Rachel Van Hollebeke	26 August 1985 (aged 29)	112	5	(United States Soccer Federation) Portland Thorns
20	FW	Abby Wambach (captain)	2 June 1980 (aged 34)	234	177	(United States Soccer Federation) Western New York Flash
22	DF	Crystal Dunn	3 July 1992 (aged 22)	13	0	(United States Soccer Federation) Washington Spirit
23	FW	Christen Press	29 December 1988 (aged 26)	37	19	(United States Soccer Federation) Chicago Red Stars
24	GK	Ashlyn Harris	19 October 1985 (aged 29)	6	0	(United States Soccer Federation) Washington Spirit
25	DF	Meghan Klingenberg	2 August 1988 (aged 26)	26	1	(United States Soccer Federation) Houston Dash
26	DF	Julie Johnston	6 April 1992 (aged 22)	5	0	(United States Soccer Federation) Chicago Red Stars

== Group C ==
=== Denmark ===
The squad was announced on 12 February 2015.

Head coach: Nils Nielsen

No.	Pos.	Player	Date of birth (age)	Caps	Goals	Club
1	GK	Stina Lykke Petersen	9 February 1986 (aged 29)	40	0	(German Football Association) 1. FC Köln
2	DF	Cecilie Sandvej	13 June 1990 (aged 24)	8	0	(German Football Association) SC Sand
3	DF	Janni Arnth (captain)	15 October 1986 (aged 28)	47	1	(Swedish Football Association) Linköping
4	MF	Sofie Junge Pedersen	24 April 1992 (aged 22)	33	4	(Danish Football Association) Fortuna Hjørring
5	MF	Simone Boye Sørensen	3 March 1992 (aged 23)	13	3	(Danish Football Association) Brøndby
6	DF	Nina Frausing-Pedersen	20 June 1991 (aged 23)	2	0	(German Football Association) Turbine Potsdam
7	FW	Sanne Troelsgaard Nielsen	15 August 1988 (aged 26)	77	19	(Danish Football Association) KoldingQ
8	DF	Theresa Nielsen	20 July 1986 (aged 28)	78	3	(Danish Football Association) Brøndby
9	FW	Camilla Kur Larsen	3 April 1989 (aged 25)	5	0	(United States Soccer Federation) Western New York Flash
10	MF	Pernille Harder	15 November 1992 (aged 22)	58	27	(Swedish Football Association) Linköping
11	MF	Line Sigvardsen Jensen	23 August 1991 (aged 23)	33	1	(Danish Football Association) Fortuna Hjørring
12	MF	Julie Tavlo Petersson	20 October 1989 (aged 25)	8	0	(Danish Football Association) Brøndby
13	MF	Johanna Rasmussen	2 July 1983 (aged 31)	126	35	(Swedish Football Association) Kristianstads
14	DF	Luna Gewitz	3 March 1994 (aged 21)	3	0	(Danish Football Association) Fortuna Hjørring
15	MF	Mie Leth Jans	6 February 1994 (aged 21)	3	0	(Danish Football Association) Brøndby
16	GK	Katrine Abel	28 June 1990 (aged 24)	1	0	(Danish Football Association) Brøndby
17	MF	Tenna Kappel	20 March 1992 (aged 22)	2	0	(Danish Football Association) Odense Boldklub
18	FW	Frederikke Thøgersen	24 July 1995 (aged 19)	6	0	(Danish Football Association) Fortuna Hjørring
19	MF	Sif Rykær	16 January 1988 (aged 27)	3	0	(Danish Football Association) Skovbakken
20	FW	Lotte Troelsgaard	15 August 1988 (aged 26)	3	0	(Danish Football Association) KoldingQ
21	MF	Caroline Rask	25 May 1994 (aged 20)	0	0	(Danish Football Association) Fortuna Hjørring
22	GK	Cecilie Sørensen	25 March 1987 (aged 27)	5	0	(Swedish Football Association) Vittsjö

=== France ===
The squad was announced on 23 February 2015.

Head coach: Philippe Bergeroo

No.	Pos.	Player	Date of birth (age)	Caps	Goals	Club
1	GK	Emmeline Mainguy	12 June 1988 (aged 26)	0	0	(French Football Federation) Guingamp
2	DF	Wendie Renard	20 July 1990 (aged 24)	61	16	(French Football Federation) Lyon
3	DF	Laure Boulleau	22 October 1986 (aged 28)	52	0	(French Football Federation) Paris Saint-Germain
4	MF	Sandie Toletti	13 July 1995 (aged 19)	3	0	(French Football Federation) Montpellier
5	DF	Sabrina Delannoy (captain)	18 May 1986 (aged 28)	21	2	(French Football Federation) Paris Saint-Germain
6	MF	Amandine Henry	28 September 1989 (aged 25)	33	3	(French Football Federation) Lyon
7	MF	Kenza Dali	31 July 1991 (aged 23)	6	1	(French Football Federation) Paris Saint-Germain
8	DF	Jessica Houara	29 September 1987 (aged 27)	28	1	(French Football Federation) Paris Saint-Germain
9	FW	Eugénie Le Sommer	18 May 1989 (aged 25)	98	40	(French Football Federation) Lyon
10	MF	Camille Abily	5 December 1984 (aged 30)	139	28	(French Football Federation) Lyon
11	FW	Claire Lavogez	18 June 1994 (aged 20)	4	0	(French Football Federation) Montpellier
12	MF	Élodie Thomis	13 August 1986 (aged 28)	113	31	(French Football Federation) Lyon
13	FW	Kadidiatou Diani	1 April 1995 (aged 19)	1	1	(French Football Federation) Juvisy
14	MF	Aurélie Kaci	29 December 1989 (aged 25)	2	0	(French Football Federation) Paris Saint-Germain
15	MF	Élise Bussaglia	24 September 1985 (aged 29)	139	26	(French Football Federation) Lyon
16	GK	Sarah Bouhaddi	17 October 1986 (aged 28)	89	0	(French Football Federation) Lyon
17	FW	Gaëtane Thiney	28 October 1985 (aged 29)	116	51	(French Football Federation) Juvisy
18	FW	Marie-Laure Delie	29 January 1988 (aged 27)	81	57	(French Football Federation) Paris Saint-Germain
19	DF	Griedge Mbock Bathy	26 February 1995 (aged 20)	7	0	(French Football Federation) Guingamp
20	DF	Annaïg Butel	15 February 1992 (aged 23)	3	0	(French Football Federation) Juvisy
21	GK	Méline Gérard	30 May 1990 (aged 24)	0	0	(French Football Federation) Lyon
22	DF	Marine Dafeur	20 October 1994 (aged 20)	1	0	(French Football Federation) Guingamp
23	MF	Kheira Hamraoui	13 January 1990 (aged 25)	12	0	(French Football Federation) Paris Saint-Germain

=== Japan ===
The squad was announced on 13 February 2015.

Head coach: Norio Sasaki

No.	Pos.	Player	Date of birth (age)	Caps	Goals	Club
1	GK	Miho Fukumoto	2 October 1983 (aged 31)	75	0	(Japan Football Association) Okayama Yunogo Belle
2	DF	Yukari Kinga	2 May 1984 (aged 30)	92	5	(Japan Football Association) INAC Kobe Leonessa
3	DF	Azusa Iwashimizu	14 October 1986 (aged 28)	109	11	(Japan Football Association) NTV Beleza
4	DF	Saki Kumagai	17 October 1990 (aged 24)	63	0	(French Football Federation) Lyon
5	DF	Aya Sameshima	16 June 1987 (aged 27)	57	3	(Japan Football Association) INAC Kobe Leonessa
6	MF	Mizuho Sakaguchi	15 October 1987 (aged 27)	85	26	(Japan Football Association) NTV Beleza
7	MF	Kozue Ando	9 July 1982 (aged 32)	119	18	(German Football Association) FFC Frankfurt
8	MF	Aya Miyama (captain)	28 January 1985 (aged 30)	144	34	(Japan Football Association) Okayama Yunogo Belle
9	MF	Nahomi Kawasumi	23 September 1985 (aged 29)	67	18	(Japan Football Association) INAC Kobe Leonessa
11	FW	Shinobu Ohno	23 January 1984 (aged 31)	125	39	(Japan Football Association) INAC Kobe Leonessa
12	DF	Megumi Kamionobe	15 March 1986 (aged 28)	27	2	(Japan Football Association) Albirex Niigata
13	MF	Rumi Utsugi	5 December 1988 (aged 26)	74	5	(French Football Federation) Montpellier
14	MF	Asuna Tanaka	23 April 1988 (aged 26)	30	3	(Japan Football Association) INAC Kobe Leonessa
15	FW	Megumi Takase	10 November 1990 (aged 24)	52	9	(Japan Football Association) INAC Kobe Leonessa
16	MF	Yumi Uetsuji	30 November 1987 (aged 27)	0	0	(Japan Football Association) NTV Beleza
17	FW	Yūki Ōgimi	15 July 1987 (aged 27)	112	52	(German Football Association) VfL Wolfsburg
18	GK	Ayumi Kaihori	4 September 1986 (aged 28)	46	0	(Japan Football Association) INAC Kobe Leonessa
19	DF	Saori Ariyoshi	1 November 1987 (aged 27)	30	0	(Japan Football Association) NTV Beleza
20	DF	Yuri Kawamura	17 May 1989 (aged 25)	11	1	(Japan Football Association) Vegalta Sendai
21	GK	Erina Yamane	20 December 1990 (aged 24)	13	0	(Japan Football Association) JEF United Chiba
22	FW	Kumi Yokoyama	13 August 1993 (aged 21)	0	0	(Japan Football Association) Okayama Yunogo Belle
23	MF	Asano Nagasato	24 January 1989 (aged 26)	7	1	(German Football Association) Turbine Potsdam
24	FW	Yuika Sugasawa	5 October 1990 (aged 24)	24	8	(Japan Football Association) JEF United Chiba

=== Portugal ===
The squad was announced on 23 February 2015.

Head coach: Francisco Neto

No.	Pos.	Player	Date of birth (age)	Caps	Goals	Club
1	GK	Neide Simões	19 July 1988 (aged 26)	52	0	(Portuguese Football Federation) Valadares Gaia
2	DF	Mónica Mendes	16 June 1993 (aged 21)	25	1	(United States Soccer Federation) UTB Ocelots
4	DF	Sílvia Rebelo	20 May 1989 (aged 25)	42	1	(Portuguese Football Federation) Fundação Laura Santos
5	DF	Matilde Fidalgo	15 May 1994 (aged 20)	8	0	(Portuguese Football Federation) CF Benfica
6	DF	Regina Pereira	13 August 1992 (aged 22)	31	1	(Portuguese Football Federation) Valadares Gaia
7	MF	Cláudia Neto (captain)	18 April 1988 (aged 26)	74	6	(Swedish Football Association) Linköping
8	FW	Edite Fernandes	10 October 1979 (aged 35)	116	35	(Portuguese Football Federation) Valadares Gaia
9	FW	Ana Borges	15 June 1990 (aged 24)	62	8	(The Football Association) Chelsea
10	FW	Jéssica Silva	11 December 1994 (aged 20)	27	5	(Portuguese Football Federation) Clube de Albergaria
11	FW	Diana Silva	4 June 1995 (aged 19)	5	0	(Portuguese Football Federation) Atlético Ouriense
12	GK	Patrícia Morais	17 June 1992 (aged 22)	0	0	(French Football Federation) Yzeure Allier Auvergne
13	MF	Fátima Pinto	16 January 1996 (aged 19)	7	0	(Royal Spanish Football Federation) Santa Teresa
14	MF	Dolores Silva	7 August 1991 (aged 23)	48	4	(German Football Association) MSV Duisburg
15	DF	Carole Silva Costa	3 May 1990 (aged 24)	53	4	(German Football Association) MSV Duisburg
16	FW	Laura Luís	15 August 1992 (aged 22)	26	6	(German Football Association) MSV Duisburg
17	MF	Vanessa Marques	12 April 1996 (aged 18)	15	2	(Portuguese Football Federation) Valadares Gaia
18	MF	Carolina Mendes	27 November 1987 (aged 27)	35	8	(Russian Football Union) Rossiyanka
19	FW	Andreia Silva	16 March 1985 (aged 29)	7	1	(Portuguese Football Federation) CF Benfica
20	DF	Filipa Rodrigues	4 September 1993 (aged 21)	11	2	(Portuguese Football Federation) Atlético Ouriense
21	MF	Patricia Gouveia	26 April 1987 (aged 27)	11	0	(Portuguese Football Federation) CF Benfica
22	FW	Mafalda Marujo	24 August 1991 (aged 23)	4	0	(Italian Football Federation) Torres
23	DF	Matilde Figueiras	7 August 1996 (aged 18)	0	0	(Portuguese Football Federation) A-dos-Francos

== Player representation ==
=== By club ===
Clubs with 5 or more players represented are listed.

Players	Club
12	(France) Lyon
11	(France) Paris Saint-Germain, (Germany) Wolfsburg
9	(Norway) Stabæk
7	(Japan) INAC Kobe Leonessa, (Norway) Lillestrøm, (Sweden) Rosengård
6	(Brazil) Ferroviária, (Germany) FFC Frankfurt, (Germany) Turbine Potsdam, (Iceland) Stjarnan, (Sweden) Linköping
5	(Denmark) Brøndby, (Denmark) Fortuna Hjørring, (France) Montpellier, (Germany) Bayern Munich, (Sweden) Eskilstuna United, (Switzerland) Zürich, (United States) Houston Dash

=== By club nationality ===
Players	Clubs
42	Germany
35	France
31	Sweden
30	United States
24	Norway
18	China, Japan
16	Brazil
14	Denmark
13	Iceland
12	Portugal
9	Switzerland
4	England
3	South Korea
1	Italy, Russia, Spain

=== By club federation ===
Players	Federation
187	UEFA
39	AFC
30	CONCACAF
16	CONMEBOL

=== By representatives of domestic league ===
National squad	Players
France	23
United States	23
Norway	20
Germany	19
China	18
Japan	18
Brazil	16
Sweden	15
Denmark	14
Iceland	13
Portugal	12
Switzerland	9
