= 2020 Algarve Cup squads =

Lists of the squads for the 2020 Algarve Cup

This article lists the squads for the 2020 Algarve Cup, the 27th edition of the Algarve Cup. The cup consisted of a series of friendly games, and was held in the Algarve region of Portugal from 4 to 11 March 2020. The eight national teams involved in the tournament registered a squad of 23 players.

The age listed for each player is as of 4 March 2020, the first day of the tournament. The numbers of caps and goals listed for each player do not include any matches played after the start of tournament. The club listed is the club for which the player last played a competitive match prior to the tournament. The nationality for each club reflects the national association (not the league) to which the club is affiliated. A flag is included for coaches that are of a different nationality than their own national team.

== Squads ==
=== Belgium ===
Coach: Ives Serneels

The squad was announced on 19 February 2020.

| No. | Pos. | Player | Date of birth (age) | Caps | Goals | Club |
|---|---|---|---|---|---|---|
| 1 | GK | Justien Odeurs | 13 May 1997 (aged 22) | 33 | 0 | (Royal Belgian Football Association) Anderlecht |
| 2 | DF | Davina Philtjens | 26 February 1989 (aged 31) | 78 | 8 | (Italian Football Federation) Fiorentina |
| 3 | DF | Isabelle Iliano | 2 March 1997 (aged 23) | 1 | 0 | (Royal Belgian Football Association) Gent |
| 4 | DF | Heleen Jaques | 20 April 1988 (aged 31) | 89 | 2 | (Italian Football Federation) Sassuolo |
| 5 | DF | Shari Van Belle | 22 December 1999 (aged 20) | 6 | 0 | (Royal Belgian Football Association) Gent |
| 6 | MF | Tine De Caigny | 9 June 1997 (aged 22) | 36 | 9 | (Royal Belgian Football Association) Anderlecht |
| 7 | MF | Alexandra Soree | 1 August 1998 (aged 21) | 2 | 0 | (United States Soccer Federation) UCF Knights |
| 8 | FW | Sarah Wijnants | 13 October 1999 (aged 20) | 9 | 0 | (Royal Belgian Football Association) Anderlecht |
| 9 | FW | Tessa Wullaert | 19 March 1993 (aged 26) | 78 | 39 | (The Football Association) Manchester City |
| 10 | MF | Justine Vanhaevermaet | 29 April 1992 (aged 27) | 10 | 0 | (Norwegian Football Federation) Røa |
| 11 | FW | Janice Cayman | 12 October 1988 (aged 31) | 92 | 34 | (French Football Federation) Lyon |
| 12 | GK | Diede Lemey | 7 October 1996 (aged 23) | 4 | 0 | (Italian Football Federation) Sassuolo |
| 13 | FW | Elena Dhont | 27 March 1998 (aged 21) | 10 | 1 | (Royal Belgian Football Association) Gent |
| 14 | FW | Davinia Vanmechelen | 30 August 1999 (aged 20) | 16 | 4 | (Royal Dutch Football Association) Twente |
| 15 | MF | Charlotte Tison | 21 April 1998 (aged 21) | 6 | 0 | (Royal Belgian Football Association) Anderlecht |
| 16 | MF | Marie Minnaert | 5 May 1999 (aged 20) | 3 | 0 | (Royal Belgian Football Association) Gent |
| 17 | DF | Maud Coutereels | 21 May 1986 (aged 33) | 86 | 9 | (French Football Federation) Lille |
| 18 | DF | Laura De Neve | 9 October 1994 (aged 25) | 15 | 0 | (Royal Belgian Football Association) Anderlecht |
| 19 | FW | Chloé Vande Velde | 6 June 1997 (aged 22) | 10 | 1 | (Royal Belgian Football Association) Gent |
| 20 | DF | Julie Biesmans | 4 May 1994 (aged 25) | 47 | 2 | (Royal Dutch Football Association) PSV |
| 21 | GK | Nicky Evrard | 26 May 1995 (aged 24) | 16 | 0 | (Royal Spanish Football Federation) Sporting Huelva |
| 22 | DF | Laura Deloose | 19 June 1993 (aged 26) | 24 | 3 | (Royal Belgian Football Association) Anderlecht |
| 23 | MF | Kassandra Missipo | 3 February 1998 (aged 22) | 13 | 0 | (Royal Belgian Football Association) Gent |
| 25 | FW | Lisa Petry | 12 February 2001 (aged 19) | 1 | 0 | (Royal Belgian Football Association) Standard Liège |
| 26 | FW | Lola Wajnblum | 22 January 1996 (aged 24) | 4 | 0 | (Royal Belgian Football Association) Standard Liège |
| | GK | Lisa Lichtfus | 29 December 1999 (aged 20) | 0 | 0 | (Royal Belgian Football Association) Standard Liège |
| | FW | Ella Van Kerkhoven | 20 November 1993 (aged 26) | 7 | 1 | (Italian Football Federation) Inter Milan |
| | DF | Jody Vangheluwe | 15 July 1997 (aged 22) | 2 | 0 | (Royal Belgian Football Association) Club Brugge |

=== Denmark ===
Coach: Lars Søndergaard

The squad was announced on 19 February 2020. Janni Arnth was withdrawn due to illness and replaced by Luna Gevitz. On 28 February 2020, Nadia Nadim was withdrawn due to injury and replaced by Amalie Thestrup while Juventus-based player Sofie Junge Pedersen was withdrawn as a safety measure due to coronavirus precautions and replaced by Josefine Hasbo.

| No. | Pos. | Player | Date of birth (age) | Caps | Goals | Club |
|---|---|---|---|---|---|---|
| 1 | GK | Katrine Abel | 28 June 1990 (aged 29) | 12 | 0 | (Danish Football Association) Brøndby |
| 2 | FW | Emma Snerle | 23 March 2001 (aged 18) | 6 | 0 | (Danish Football Association) Fortuna Hjørring |
| 4 | DF | Rikke Sevecke | 15 June 1996 (aged 23) | 19 | 1 | (French Football Federation) FC Fleury 91 |
| 5 | DF | Simone Boye Sørensen | 3 March 1992 (aged 28) | 55 | 5 | (German Football Association) Bayern Munich |
| 6 | MF | Nanna Christiansen | 17 June 1989 (aged 30) | 101 | 9 | (Danish Football Association) Brøndby |
| 7 | MF | Sanne Troelsgaard Nielsen | 15 August 1988 (aged 31) | 142 | 49 | (Swedish Football Association) Rosengård |
| 8 | DF | Theresa Eslund | 20 July 1986 (aged 33) | 128 | 5 | (Danish Football Association) Brøndby |
| 10 | FW | Pernille Harder (captain) | 15 November 1992 (aged 27) | 115 | 59 | (German Football Association) VfL Wolfsburg |
| 12 | FW | Stine Larsen | 24 January 1996 (aged 24) | 42 | 12 | (French Football Federation) FC Fleury 91 |
| 14 | MF | Nicoline Sørensen | 15 August 1997 (aged 22) | 30 | 7 | (Danish Football Association) Brøndby |
| 15 | FW | Frederikke Thøgersen | 24 July 1995 (aged 24) | 49 | 1 | (Italian Football Federation) Fiorentina |
| 17 | FW | Rikke Madsen | 9 August 1997 (aged 22) | 6 | 1 | (Norwegian Football Federation) Vålerenga |
| 18 | DF | Sara Holmgaard | 28 January 1999 (aged 21) | 3 | 0 | (Danish Football Association) Fortuna Hjørring |
| 19 | DF | Stine Ballisager Pedersen | 3 January 1994 (aged 26) | 13 | 1 | (Norwegian Football Federation) Vålerenga |
| 20 | MF | Sara Andersen | 15 May 1996 (aged 23) | 9 | 0 | (Danish Football Association) Fortuna Hjørring |
| 21 | FW | Amalie Thestrup | 17 March 1995 (aged 24) | 2 | 0 | (Italian Football Federation) Roma |
| 22 | GK | Kathrine Larsen | 5 May 1993 (aged 26) | 0 | 0 | (Swedish Football Association) Djurgården |
| 23 | DF | Sofie Svava | 11 August 2000 (aged 19) | 7 | 1 | (Swedish Football Association) Rosengård |
| 24 | FW | Caroline Møller | 19 December 1998 (aged 21) | 0 | 0 | (Danish Football Association) Fortuna Hjørring |
| 25 | MF | Janni Thomsen | 15 February 2000 (aged 20) | 0 | 0 | (Danish Football Association) Aarhus |
| 26 | MF | Josefine Hasbo | 20 November 2001 (aged 18) | 0 | 0 | (Danish Football Association) Brøndby |
| 27 | DF | Luna Gevitz | 3 March 1994 (aged 26) | 4 | 0 | (French Football Federation) Guingamp |

=== Germany ===
Coach: Martina Voss-Tecklenburg

The squad was announced on 24 February 2020.

| No. | Pos. | Player | Date of birth (age) | Caps | Goals | Club |
|---|---|---|---|---|---|---|
| 1 | GK | Merle Frohms | 28 January 1995 (aged 25) | 9 | 0 | (German Football Association) SC Freiburg |
| 3 | DF | Kathrin Hendrich | 6 April 1992 (aged 27) | 33 | 4 | (German Football Association) Bayern Munich |
| 4 | DF | Leonie Maier | 29 September 1992 (aged 27) | 71 | 11 | (The Football Association) Arsenal |
| 5 | DF | Marina Hegering | 17 April 1990 (aged 29) | 9 | 0 | (German Football Association) SGS Essen |
| 6 | DF | Lena Oberdorf | 19 December 2001 (aged 18) | 12 | 2 | (German Football Association) SGS Essen |
| 7 | FW | Lea Schüller | 12 November 1997 (aged 22) | 19 | 10 | (German Football Association) SGS Essen |
| 8 | FW | Pauline Bremer | 10 April 1996 (aged 23) | 19 | 4 | (The Football Association) Manchester City |
| 9 | MF | Svenja Huth | 25 January 1991 (aged 29) | 51 | 9 | (German Football Association) VfL Wolfsburg |
| 10 | MF | Dzsenifer Marozsán | 18 April 1992 (aged 27) | 97 | 32 | (French Football Federation) Lyon |
| 11 | FW | Alexandra Popp (captain) | 6 April 1991 (aged 28) | 106 | 53 | (German Football Association) VfL Wolfsburg |
| 12 | GK | Laura Benkarth | 14 October 1992 (aged 27) | 8 | 0 | (German Football Association) Bayern Munich |
| 13 | FW | Laura Freigang | 1 February 1998 (aged 22) | 0 | 0 | (German Football Association) 1. FFC Frankfurt |
| 14 | DF | Johanna Elsig | 1 November 1992 (aged 27) | 14 | 0 | (German Football Association) Turbine Potsdam |
| 15 | DF | Giulia Gwinn | 2 July 1999 (aged 20) | 17 | 3 | (German Football Association) Bayern Munich |
| 16 | MF | Linda Dallmann | 2 September 1994 (aged 25) | 27 | 6 | (German Football Association) Bayern Munich |
| 17 | DF | Felicitas Rauch | 30 April 1996 (aged 23) | 11 | 1 | (German Football Association) VfL Wolfsburg |
| 18 | MF | Melanie Leupolz | 14 April 1994 (aged 25) | 65 | 10 | (German Football Association) Bayern Munich |
| 19 | FW | Klara Bühl | 7 December 2000 (aged 19) | 10 | 7 | (German Football Association) SC Freiburg |
| 20 | MF | Lina Magull | 15 August 1994 (aged 25) | 41 | 13 | (German Football Association) Bayern Munich |
| 21 | GK | Ann-Katrin Berger | 9 October 1990 (aged 29) | 0 | 0 | (The Football Association) Chelsea |
| 22 | MF | Turid Knaak | 24 January 1991 (aged 29) | 12 | 2 | (German Football Association) SGS Essen |
| 23 | DF | Sara Doorsoun | 17 November 1991 (aged 28) | 33 | 1 | (German Football Association) VfL Wolfsburg |
| 24 | DF | Sophia Kleinherne | 12 April 2000 (aged 19) | 1 | 0 | (German Football Association) 1. FFC Frankfurt |
| 25 | MF | Sydney Lohmann | 19 June 2000 (aged 19) | 1 | 0 | (German Football Association) Bayern Munich |
| 26 | MF | Lena Lattwein | 2 May 2000 (aged 19) | 5 | 0 | (German Football Association) TSG Hoffenheim |
| 27 | FW | Lena Petermann | 5 February 1994 (aged 26) | 18 | 5 | (French Football Federation) Montpellier |

=== Italy ===
Coach: Milena Bertolini

The squad was announced on 20 February 2020. Due to coronavirus fears following an outbreak in Lombardy, the four Milan-based players Valentina Bergamaschi, Laura Fusetti, Valentina Giacinti, and Linda Tucceri Cimini were removed from the squad and replaced with Agnese Bonfantini, Arianna Caruso, Martina Lenzini, and Alice Tortelli on 27 February 2020.

| No. | Pos. | Player | Date of birth (age) | Caps | Goals | Club |
|---|---|---|---|---|---|---|
| 1 | GK | Laura Giuliani | 6 June 1993 (aged 26) | 40 | 0 | (Italian Football Federation) Juventus |
| 2 | DF | Martina Lenzini | 23 July 1998 (aged 21) | 0 | 0 | (Italian Football Federation) Sassuolo |
| 3 | DF | Sara Gama (captain) | 27 March 1989 (aged 30) | 101 | 5 | (Italian Football Federation) Juventus |
| 4 | MF | Aurora Galli | 13 December 1996 (aged 23) | 28 | 4 | (Italian Football Federation) Juventus |
| 5 | DF | Elena Linari | 15 April 1994 (aged 25) | 34 | 0 | (Royal Spanish Football Federation) Atlético Madrid |
| 6 | MF | Manuela Giugliano | 18 August 1997 (aged 22) | 26 | 3 | (Italian Football Federation) Roma |
| 7 | DF | Alia Guagni | 1 October 1987 (aged 32) | 67 | 5 | (Italian Football Federation) Fiorentina |
| 8 | MF | Martina Rosucci | 9 May 1992 (aged 27) | 37 | 1 | (Italian Football Federation) Juventus |
| 9 | FW | Daniela Sabatino | 26 June 1985 (aged 34) | 49 | 21 | (Italian Football Federation) Sassuolo |
| 10 | FW | Cristiana Girelli | 23 April 1990 (aged 29) | 56 | 31 | (Italian Football Federation) Juventus |
| 11 | FW | Barbara Bonansea | 13 June 1991 (aged 28) | 54 | 19 | (Italian Football Federation) Juventus |
| 12 | GK | Katja Schroffenegger | 28 April 1991 (aged 28) | 12 | 0 | (Italian Football Federation) Florentia San Gimignano |
| 13 | DF | Elisa Bartoli | 7 May 1991 (aged 28) | 51 | 1 | (Italian Football Federation) Roma |
| 14 | FW | Stefania Tarenzi | 29 February 1988 (aged 32) | 3 | 1 | (Italian Football Federation) Inter Milan |
| 15 | MF | Marta Mascarello | 15 October 1998 (aged 21) | 0 | 0 | (Italian Football Federation) Fiorentina |
| 16 | DF | Alice Tortelli | 22 January 1998 (aged 22) | 0 | 0 | (Italian Football Federation) Fiorentina |
| 17 | DF | Lisa Boattin | 3 May 1997 (aged 22) | 14 | 0 | (Italian Football Federation) Juventus |
| 18 | FW | Tatiana Bonetti | 15 December 1991 (aged 28) | 0 | 0 | (Italian Football Federation) Fiorentina |
| 19 | FW | Agnese Bonfantini | 4 July 1999 (aged 20) | 1 | 0 | (Italian Football Federation) Roma |
| 20 | MF | Arianna Caruso | 6 November 1999 (aged 20) | 2 | 0 | (Italian Football Federation) Juventus |
| 21 | MF | Valentina Cernoia | 22 June 1991 (aged 28) | 36 | 6 | (Italian Football Federation) Juventus |
| 22 | GK | Rachele Baldi | 2 October 1994 (aged 25) | 0 | 0 | (Italian Football Federation) Empoli |
| 23 | DF | Cecilia Salvai | 2 December 1993 (aged 26) | 26 | 1 | (Italian Football Federation) Juventus |

=== New Zealand ===
Coach: (Scotland) Tom Sermanni

The squad was announced on 27 February 2020. Following the first match of the tournament, Sarah Gregorius retired having made 100 appearances for the team.

| No. | Pos. | Player | Date of birth (age) | Caps | Goals | Club |
|---|---|---|---|---|---|---|
| 1 | GK | Erin Nayler | 17 April 1992 (aged 27) | 67 | 0 | (French Football Federation) Bordeaux |
| 2 | MF | Ria Percival | 7 December 1989 (aged 30) | 145 | 14 | (The Football Association) Tottenham Hotspur |
| 4 | DF | CJ Bott | 22 April 1995 (aged 24) | 19 | 1 | (Swedish Football Association) Vittsjö |
| 5 | DF | Meikayla Moore | 4 June 1996 (aged 23) | 35 | 3 | (German Football Association) MSV Duisburg |
| 6 | DF | Rebekah Stott | 17 June 1993 (aged 26) | 76 | 4 | (Norwegian Football Federation) Avaldsnes |
| 7 | DF | Ali Riley (captain) | 30 October 1987 (aged 32) | 129 | 1 | (United States Soccer Federation) Orlando Pride |
| 9 | FW | Katie Rood | 2 September 1992 (aged 27) | 10 | 5 | (The Football Association) Lewes |
| 10 | MF | Annalie Longo | 1 July 1991 (aged 28) | 119 | 15 | (Football Australia) Melbourne Victory |
| 11 | FW | Sarah Gregorius | 6 August 1987 (aged 32) | 99 | 34 | Unattached |
| 12 | MF | Betsy Hassett | 4 August 1990 (aged 29) | 116 | 13 | (Football Association of Iceland) KR Reykjavík |
| 13 | FW | Rosie White | 6 June 1993 (aged 26) | 105 | 24 | (United States Soccer Federation) Reign FC |
| 14 | MF | Katie Bowen | 15 April 1994 (aged 25) | 65 | 3 | (United States Soccer Federation) Utah Royals |
| 15 | DF | Nicole Stratford | 1 February 1989 (aged 31) | 2 | 0 | (German Football Association) USV Jena |
| 16 | MF | Jana Radosavljević | 4 November 1996 (aged 23) | 2 | 0 | (German Football Association) BV Cloppenburg |
| 17 | FW | Hannah Wilkinson | 28 May 1992 (aged 27) | 92 | 25 | (Portuguese Football Federation) Sporting CP |
| 18 | DF | Stephanie Skilton | 27 October 1994 (aged 25) | 9 | 0 | (New Zealand Football) Auckland Football |
| 19 | FW | Paige Satchell | 13 April 1998 (aged 21) | 15 | 1 | (German Football Association) SC Sand |
| 20 | MF | Daisy Cleverley | 30 April 1997 (aged 22) | 8 | 2 | (United States Soccer Federation) California Golden Bears |
| 21 | GK | Victoria Esson | 6 March 1991 (aged 28) | 3 | 0 | (Norwegian Football Federation) Avaldsnes |
| 22 | MF | Olivia Chance | 5 October 1993 (aged 26) | 17 | 0 | (The Football Association) Bristol City |
| 23 | GK | Anna Leat | 26 June 2001 (aged 18) | 3 | 0 | (New Zealand Football) East Coast Bays |
| 24 | DF | Claudia Bunge | 21 September 1999 (aged 20) | 2 | 0 | (New Zealand Football) Northern Lights |
| 25 | FW | Michaela Robertson | | 0 | 0 | (New Zealand Football) Wellington United |
| 26 | DF | Marisa van der Meer | 9 January 1999 (aged 21) | 0 | 0 | (New Zealand Football) Canterbury United Pride |

=== Norway ===
Coach: (Sweden) Martin Sjögren

The squad was announced on 14 February 2020. Stine Reinås and Therese Åsland replaced Stine Hovland and Synne Skinnes Hansen on 28 February 2020.

| No. | Pos. | Player | Date of birth (age) | Caps | Goals | Club |
|---|---|---|---|---|---|---|
| 1 | GK | Cecilie Fiskerstrand | 20 March 1996 (aged 23) | 26 | 0 | (The Football Association) Brighton & Hove Albion |
| 2 | DF | Ingrid Moe Wold | 29 January 1990 (aged 30) | 70 | 3 | (Royal Spanish Football Federation) Madrid CFF |
| 3 | DF | Maria Thorisdottir | 5 June 1993 (aged 26) | 41 | 2 | (The Football Association) Chelsea |
| 4 | DF | Stine Reinås | 15 July 1994 (aged 25) | 8 | 1 | (Norwegian Football Federation) Stabæk |
| 5 | FW | Therese Åsland | 26 August 1995 (aged 24) | 6 | 1 | (Swedish Football Association) Kristianstad |
| 6 | DF | Maren Mjelde | 6 November 1989 (aged 30) | 146 | 19 | (The Football Association) Chelsea |
| 7 | FW | Elise Thorsnes | 14 August 1988 (aged 31) | 121 | 20 | (Football Australia) Canberra United |
| 8 | MF | Vilde Bøe Risa | 13 July 1995 (aged 24) | 28 | 2 | (Swedish Football Association) Göteborg |
| 9 | DF | Anja Sønstevold | 21 June 1992 (aged 27) | 15 | 0 | (Norwegian Football Federation) LSK Kvinner |
| 10 | FW | Caroline Graham Hansen | 18 February 1995 (aged 25) | 82 | 37 | (Royal Spanish Football Federation) Barcelona |
| 11 | FW | Lisa-Marie Karlseng Utland | 19 September 1992 (aged 27) | 51 | 19 | (The Football Association) Reading |
| 12 | GK | Oda Maria Hove Bogstad | 24 April 1996 (aged 23) | 0 | 0 | (Norwegian Football Federation) Arna-Bjørnar |
| 13 | MF | Tuva Hansen | 4 August 1997 (aged 22) | 2 | 0 | (Norwegian Football Federation) Klepp |
| 14 | MF | Ingrid Syrstad Engen | 29 April 1998 (aged 21) | 26 | 5 | (German Football Association) VfL Wolfsburg |
| 15 | FW | Amalie Eikeland | 26 August 1995 (aged 24) | 12 | 3 | (The Football Association) Reading |
| 16 | MF | Guro Reiten | 26 July 1994 (aged 25) | 47 | 9 | (The Football Association) Chelsea |
| 17 | MF | Kristine Minde | 8 August 1992 (aged 27) | 103 | 9 | (German Football Association) VfL Wolfsburg |
| 18 | MF | Frida Maanum | 16 July 1999 (aged 20) | 29 | 2 | (Swedish Football Association) Linköping |
| 19 | FW | Synne Jensen | 15 February 1996 (aged 24) | 22 | 2 | (Norwegian Football Federation) LSK Kvinner |
| 20 | DF | Emilie Woldvik | 8 January 1999 (aged 21) | 0 | 0 | (Norwegian Football Federation) LSK Kvinner |
| 21 | MF | Karina Sævik | 24 March 1996 (aged 23) | 13 | 2 | (French Football Federation) Paris Saint-Germain |
| 22 | MF | Rikke Bogetveit Nygård | 22 May 2000 (aged 19) | 1 | 0 | (Norwegian Football Federation) Arna-Bjørnar |
| 23 | GK | Aurora Mikalsen | 21 March 1996 (aged 23) | 0 | 0 | (The Football Association) Manchester United |

=== Portugal ===
Coach: Francisco Neto

The squad was announced on 24 February 2020.

| No. | Pos. | Player | Date of birth (age) | Caps | Goals | Club |
|---|---|---|---|---|---|---|
| 1 | GK | Inês Pereira | 26 May 1999 (aged 20) | 13 | 0 | (Portuguese Football Federation) Sporting CP |
| 2 | MF | Andreia Jacinto | 8 June 2002 (aged 17) | 0 | 0 | (Portuguese Football Federation) Sporting CP |
| 3 | DF | Joana Marchão | 24 October 1996 (aged 23) | 5 | 0 | (Portuguese Football Federation) Sporting CP |
| 4 | DF | Sílvia Rebelo | 20 May 1989 (aged 30) | 93 | 1 | (Portuguese Football Federation) Benfica |
| 5 | DF | Matilde Fidalgo | 15 May 1994 (aged 25) | 43 | 0 | (The Football Association) Manchester City |
| 6 | MF | Andreia Norton | 15 August 1996 (aged 23) | 26 | 3 | (Italian Football Federation) Inter Milan |
| 7 | MF | Cláudia Neto | 18 April 1988 (aged 31) | 126 | 18 | (German Football Association) VfL Wolfsburg |
| 8 | FW | Mélissa Gomes | 27 April 1994 (aged 25) | 6 | 0 | (French Football Federation) Stade de Reims |
| 9 | DF | Ana Borges | 15 June 1990 (aged 29) | 120 | 9 | (Portuguese Football Federation) Sporting CP |
| 10 | FW | Jéssica Silva | 11 December 1994 (aged 25) | 64 | 7 | (French Football Federation) Lyon |
| 11 | MF | Tatiana Pinto | 28 March 1994 (aged 25) | 38 | 1 | (Portuguese Football Federation) Sporting CP |
| 12 | GK | Patrícia Morais | 17 June 1992 (aged 27) | 56 | 0 | (Portuguese Football Federation) Sporting CP |
| 13 | MF | Fátima Pinto | 16 January 1996 (aged 24) | 42 | 1 | (Portuguese Football Federation) Sporting CP |
| 14 | MF | Dolores Silva | 7 August 1991 (aged 28) | 112 | 12 | (Portuguese Football Federation) Braga |
| 15 | DF | Carole Costa | 3 May 1990 (aged 29) | 115 | 10 | (Portuguese Football Federation) Sporting CP |
| 16 | FW | Diana Silva | 4 June 1995 (aged 24) | 47 | 8 | (Portuguese Football Federation) Sporting CP |
| 17 | MF | Vanessa Marques | 12 April 1996 (aged 23) | 61 | 7 | (Portuguese Football Federation) Braga |
| 18 | FW | Carolina Mendes | 27 November 1987 (aged 32) | 91 | 19 | (Portuguese Football Federation) Sporting CP |
| 19 | DF | Diana Gomes | 26 July 1998 (aged 21) | 5 | 0 | (Portuguese Football Federation) Braga |
| 20 | MF | Andreia Faria | 19 April 2000 (aged 19) | 0 | 0 | (Portuguese Football Federation) Benfica |
| 21 | MF | Francisca Nazareth | 17 November 2002 (aged 17) | 0 | 0 | (Portuguese Football Federation) Benfica |
| 22 | GK | Bárbara Santos | 6 January 1994 (aged 26) | 0 | 0 | (Portuguese Football Federation) Marítimo |
| 23 | MF | Joana Martins | 4 October 2000 (aged 19) | 1 | 0 | (Portuguese Football Federation) Sporting CP |

=== Sweden ===
Coach: Peter Gerhardsson

The squad was announced on 19 February 2020. On 28 February 2020, Elin Rubensson was withdrawn from the squad due to a head injury and replaced with Julia Karlernäs, while Julia Zigiotti Olme was replaced by club mate Filippa Angeldal. On 1 March 2020, Juventus-based player Linda Sembrant was withdrawn from the squad as a safety measure due to coronavirus concerns, and was replaced by Lotta Ökvist.

| No. | Pos. | Player | Date of birth (age) | Caps | Goals | Club |
|---|---|---|---|---|---|---|
| 1 | GK | Hedvig Lindahl | 29 April 1983 (aged 36) | 168 | 0 | (German Football Association) VfL Wolfsburg |
| 2 | DF | Jonna Andersson | 2 January 1993 (aged 27) | 45 | 0 | (The Football Association) Chelsea |
| 3 | DF | Lotta Ökvist | 17 February 1997 (aged 23) | 0 | 0 | (The Football Association) Manchester United |
| 4 | DF | Hanna Glas | 16 April 1993 (aged 26) | 32 | 0 | (French Football Federation) Paris Saint-Germain |
| 5 | DF | Emma Kullberg | 25 September 1991 (aged 28) | 0 | 0 | (Swedish Football Association) Kopparbergs/Göteborg |
| 6 | DF | Magdalena Eriksson | 8 September 1993 (aged 26) | 58 | 6 | (The Football Association) Chelsea |
| 7 | FW | Madelen Janogy | 12 November 1995 (aged 24) | 10 | 4 | (German Football Association) VfL Wolfsburg |
| 8 | FW | Lina Hurtig | 5 September 1995 (aged 24) | 28 | 5 | (Swedish Football Association) Linköping |
| 9 | MF | Kosovare Asllani | 29 July 1989 (aged 30) | 137 | 37 | (Royal Spanish Football Federation) Tacón |
| 10 | FW | Sofia Jakobsson | 23 April 1990 (aged 29) | 110 | 20 | (Royal Spanish Football Federation) Tacón |
| 11 | FW | Stina Blackstenius | 5 February 1996 (aged 24) | 53 | 14 | (Swedish Football Association) Linköping |
| 12 | GK | Jennifer Falk | 26 April 1993 (aged 26) | 0 | 0 | (Swedish Football Association) Kopparbergs/Göteborg |
| 13 | DF | Amanda Ilestedt | 17 January 1993 (aged 27) | 30 | 3 | (German Football Association) Bayern Munich |
| 14 | DF | Nathalie Björn | 4 May 1997 (aged 22) | 15 | 3 | (Swedish Football Association) Rosengård |
| 15 | DF | Jessica Samuelsson | 30 January 1992 (aged 28) | 56 | 0 | (Swedish Football Association) Rosengård |
| 16 | MF | Filippa Angeldal | 14 July 1997 (aged 22) | 2 | 1 | (Swedish Football Association) Kopparbergs/Göteborg |
| 17 | MF | Caroline Seger (captain) | 19 March 1985 (aged 34) | 201 | 28 | (Swedish Football Association) Rosengård |
| 18 | FW | Fridolina Rolfö | 24 November 1993 (aged 26) | 41 | 9 | (German Football Association) VfL Wolfsburg |
| 19 | FW | Loreta Kullashi | 20 May 1999 (aged 20) | 5 | 3 | (Swedish Football Association) Eskilstuna United |
| 20 | FW | Mimmi Larsson | 9 April 1994 (aged 25) | 20 | 6 | (Swedish Football Association) Rosengård |
| 21 | GK | Zećira Mušović | 26 May 1996 (aged 23) | 2 | 0 | (Swedish Football Association) Rosengård |
| 22 | FW | Rebecka Blomqvist | 24 July 1997 (aged 22) | 1 | 0 | (Swedish Football Association) Kopparbergs/Göteborg |
| 23 | MF | Julia Karlernäs | 6 October 1993 (aged 26) | 4 | 0 | (Swedish Football Association) Piteå |
| 24 | MF | Hanna Bennison | 16 October 2002 (aged 17) | 0 | 0 | (Swedish Football Association) Rosengård |

== Player representation ==
=== By club ===
Clubs with 4 or more players represented are listed.

| Players | Club |
|---|---|
| 12 | (Portugal) Sporting CP |
| 11 | (Germany) VfL Wolfsburg |
| 10 | (Italy) Juventus |
| 9 | (Germany) Bayern Munich |
| 8 | (Sweden) Rosengård |
| 6 | (Belgium) Anderlecht, (Belgium) Gent, (England) Chelsea, (Italy) Fiorentina |
| 5 | (Denmark) Brøndby |
| 4 | (Denmark) Fortuna Hjørring, (Germany) SGS Essen, (Italy) Roma, (Italy) Sassuolo, (Sweden) Kopparbergs/Göteborg |

=== By club nationality ===
| Players | Clubs |
|---|---|
| 34 | Germany |
| 29 | Italy |
| 21 | Sweden |
| 19 | Portugal |
| 18 | England |
| 16 | Belgium |
| 12 | France, Norway |
| 10 | Denmark |
| 6 | Spain |
| 5 | New Zealand, United States |
| 2 | Australia, Netherlands |
| 1 | Iceland |

=== By club federation ===
| Players | Federation |
|---|---|
| 180 | UEFA |
| 5 | CONCACAF |
| 5 | OFC |
| 2 | AFC |

=== By representatives of domestic league ===
| National squad | Players |
|---|---|
| Italy | 22 |
| Germany | 21 |
| Portugal | 18 |
| Belgium | 16 |
| Sweden | 14 |
| Denmark | 10 |
| Norway | 7 |
| New Zealand | 5 |
