= 2016 Algarve Cup squads =

Lists of the squads for the 2016 Algarve Cup

This article lists the squads for the 2016 Algarve Cup, the 23rd edition of the Algarve Cup. The cup consisted of a series of friendly games, and was held in the Algarve region of Portugal from 2 to 9 March 2016. The eight national teams involved in the tournament registered a squad of 23 players.

The age listed for each player is as of 2 March 2016, the first day of the tournament. The numbers of caps and goals listed for each player do not include any matches played after the start of tournament. The club listed is the club for which the player last played a competitive match prior to the tournament. The nationality for each club reflects the national association (not the league) to which the club is affiliated. A flag is included for coaches that are of a different nationality than their own national team.

== Group A ==
=== Belgium ===
Belgium announced their squad on 21 February 2016.

Head coach: Ives Serneels

No.	Pos.	Player	Date of birth (age)	Caps	Goals	Club
1	GK	Justien Odeurs	30 May 1997 (aged 18)	9	0	(Royal Belgian Football Association) Lierse
2	MF	Davina Philtjens	26 February 1989 (aged 27)	39	4	(Royal Belgian Football Association) Standard Liège
3	DF	Heleen Jaques	20 April 1988 (aged 27)	55	1	(Royal Belgian Football Association) Anderlecht
4	DF	Maud Coutereels	21 May 1986 (aged 29)	48	4	(Royal Belgian Football Association) Standard Liège
5	DF	Lorca Van De Putte	3 April 1988 (aged 27)	44	2	(Swedish Football Association) Kristianstads
6	MF	Tine De Caigny	9 June 1997 (aged 18)	12	4	(Royal Belgian Football Association) Lierse
7	MF	Elke Van Gorp	12 May 1995 (aged 20)	11	3	(Royal Belgian Football Association) Lierse
8	MF	Cecile De Gernier	25 May 1986 (aged 29)	26	5	(Royal Belgian Football Association) Standard Liège
9	FW	Tessa Wullaert	19 March 1993 (aged 22)	37	25	(German Football Association) VfL Wolfsburg
10	FW	Aline Zeler (captain)	2 June 1983 (aged 32)	70	25	(Royal Belgian Football Association) Standard Liège
11	DF	Janice Cayman	12 October 1988 (aged 27)	47	8	(French Football Federation) Juvisy
12	GK	Nicky Evrard	26 May 1995 (aged 20)	12	0	(Royal Belgian Football Association) Gent
13	MF	Marlies Verbruggen	8 January 1988 (aged 28)	37	0	(Royal Belgian Football Association) Anderlecht
14	MF	Lenie Onzia	30 May 1989 (aged 26)	14	4	(Royal Dutch Football Association) Twente
15	DF	Laura De Neve	9 October 1994 (aged 21)	3	0	(Royal Belgian Football Association) Anderlecht
16	DF	Nicky Van Den Abbeele	21 February 1994 (aged 22)	14	0	(Royal Belgian Football Association) Lierse
17	FW	Jana Coryn	26 June 1992 (aged 23)	6	0	(Royal Belgian Football Association) Lierse
18	MF	Anaelle Wiard	23 March 1991 (aged 24)	14	5	(Royal Belgian Football Association) Anderlecht
19	MF	Silke Demeyere	20 June 1992 (aged 23)	2	0	(Royal Belgian Football Association) Lierse
20	MF	Julie Biesmans	4 May 1994 (aged 21)	33	2	(Royal Belgian Football Association) Standard Liège
22	DF	Laura Deloose	19 June 1993 (aged 22)	2	0	(Royal Belgian Football Association) Anderlecht
23	DF	Elien Van Wynendaele	19 February 1995 (aged 21)	5	0	(Royal Belgian Football Association) Gent
24	FW	Tine Schryvers	11 March 1993 (aged 22)	0	0	(Norwegian Football Federation) Vålerengens

=== Canada ===
Canada announced their squad on 27 February 2016.

Head coach: (England) John Herdman

No.	Pos.	Player	Date of birth (age)	Caps	Goals	Club
2	DF	Allysha Chapman	25 January 1989 (aged 27)	26	1	(United States Soccer Federation) Houston Dash
3	DF	Kadeisha Buchanan	5 November 1995 (aged 20)	49	3	(United States Soccer Federation) West Virginia Mountaineers
4	DF	Shelina Zadorsky	24 October 1992 (aged 23)	9	0	(United States Soccer Federation) Washington Spirit
5	DF	Quinn (Note: Then known as Rebecca Quinn)	11 August 1995 (aged 20)	15	3	(United States Soccer Federation) Duke Blue Devils
6	MF	Deanne Rose	3 March 1999 (aged 16)	6	3	(Canadian Soccer Association) Scarborough GS United
7	DF	Rhian Wilkinson	12 May 1982 (aged 33)	170	7	Unattached
8	MF	Diana Matheson	6 April 1984 (aged 31)	176	17	(United States Soccer Federation) Washington Spirit
9	DF	Josée Bélanger	14 May 1986 (aged 29)	43	7	(United States Soccer Federation) Orlando Pride
10	MF	Ashley Lawrence	11 June 1995 (aged 20)	31	4	(United States Soccer Federation) West Virginia Mountaineers
11	MF	Desiree Scott	31 July 1987 (aged 28)	103	0	(United States Soccer Federation) Kansas City
12	FW	Christine Sinclair (captain)	12 June 1983 (aged 32)	236	161	(United States Soccer Federation) Portland Thorns
13	MF	Sophie Schmidt	28 June 1988 (aged 27)	142	16	(German Football Association) 1. FFC Frankfurt
14	FW	Melissa Tancredi	27 December 1981 (aged 34)	113	25	Unattached
15	FW	Nichelle Prince	19 February 1995 (aged 21)	11	6	(United States Soccer Federation) Ohio State Buckeyes
16	FW	Gabrielle Carle	12 October 1998 (aged 17)	4	1	(Canadian Soccer Association) Dynamo de Québec
17	MF	Jessie Fleming	11 March 1998 (aged 17)	24	2	(Canadian Soccer Association) London Nor'West
18	GK	Stephanie Labbé	10 October 1986 (aged 29)	25	0	(United States Soccer Federation) Washington Spirit
19	FW	Janine Beckie	20 August 1994 (aged 21)	11	5	(United States Soccer Federation) Houston Dash
20	GK	Sabrina D'Angelo	11 May 1993 (aged 22)	0	0	(United States Soccer Federation) Western New York Flash
21	GK	Kailen Sheridan	16 July 1995 (aged 20)	0	0	(United States Soccer Federation) Clemson Tigers
22	FW	Summer Clarke	15 September 1995 (aged 20)	0	0	(United States Soccer Federation) LSU Tigers

=== Denmark ===
Denmark announced their squad on 9 February 2016.

Head coach: Nils Nielsen

No.	Pos.	Player	Date of birth (age)	Caps	Goals	Club
1	GK	Stina Lykke Petersen	9 February 1986 (aged 30)	48	0	(Danish Football Association) OB
2	DF	Line Røddik Hansen	31 January 1988 (aged 28)	106	13	(Swedish Football Association) Rosengård
3	DF	Janni Arnth Jensen	15 October 1986 (aged 29)	56	1	(Swedish Football Association) Linköping
4	DF	Maja Kildemoes	15 August 1996 (aged 19)	5	1	(Danish Football Association) OB
5	MF	Simone Boye Sørensen	3 March 1992 (aged 23)	21	3	(Danish Football Association) Brøndby
6	MF	Line Jensen	23 August 1991 (aged 24)	41	1	(Danish Football Association) Fortuna Hjørring
7	FW	Sanne Troelsgaard	15 August 1988 (aged 27)	89	27	(Danish Football Association) KoldingQ
8	DF	Theresa Nielsen	20 July 1986 (aged 29)	90	3	(Danish Football Association) Brøndby
9	FW	Nadia Nadim	2 January 1988 (aged 28)	58	12	(Danish Football Association) Fortuna Hjørring
10	MF	Pernille Harder (captain)	15 November 1992 (aged 23)	70	31	(Swedish Football Association) Linköping
11	MF	Katrine Veje	19 June 1991 (aged 24)	75	6	(Danish Football Association) Brøndby
12	FW	Lise Munk	26 May 1989 (aged 26)	29	5	(German Football Association) 1. FC Köln
13	MF	Johanna Rasmussen	2 July 1983 (aged 32)	137	36	(Swedish Football Association) Kristianstads
14	FW	Frederikke Thøgersen	24 July 1995 (aged 20)	12	0	(Danish Football Association) Fortuna Hjørring
15	MF	Mie Leth Jans	6 February 1994 (aged 22)	7	0	(Danish Football Association) Brøndby
16	GK	Cecilie Breil Kramer	25 March 1987 (aged 28)	9	0	(Danish Football Association) Fortuna Hjørring
17	FW	Sarah Dyrehauge Hansen	14 September 1996 (aged 19)	1	0	(Danish Football Association) Fortuna Hjørring
18	DF	Cecilie Sandvej	13 June 1990 (aged 25)	15	0	(German Football Association) SC Sand
19	FW	Louise Lundsgaard Kristiansen	24 September 1987 (aged 28)	9	0	(Danish Football Association) Brøndby
20	MF	Julie Trustrup Jensen	6 April 1994 (aged 21)	10	0	(Danish Football Association) Brøndby
21	MF	Nanna Christiansen	17 June 1989 (aged 26)	58	6	(Danish Football Association) Brøndby
22	DF	Rikke Læntver Sevecke	15 June 1996 (aged 19)	0	0	(Danish Football Association) Brøndby

=== Iceland ===
Iceland announced their squad on 23 February 2016.

Head coach: Freyr Alexandersson

No.	Pos.	Player	Date of birth (age)	Caps	Goals	Club
1	GK	Guðbjörg Gunnarsdóttir	18 May 1985 (aged 30)	38	0	(Swedish Football Association) Djurgården
2	DF	Arna Ásgrímsdóttir	12 August 1992 (aged 23)	8	1	(Football Association of Iceland) Valur
3	DF	Hrafnhildur Hauksdóttir	4 September 1996 (aged 19)	1	0	(Football Association of Iceland) Selfoss
4	DF	Glódís Perla Viggósdóttir	27 June 1995 (aged 20)	34	2	(Swedish Football Association) Eskilstuna United
5	MF	Gunnhildur Yrsa Jónsdóttir	28 September 1988 (aged 27)	22	1	(Norwegian Football Federation) Stabæk
6	FW	Hólmfríður Magnúsdóttir	20 September 1984 (aged 31)	100	36	(Norwegian Football Federation) Avaldsnes
7	MF	Sara Björk Gunnarsdóttir	29 September 1990 (aged 25)	87	17	(Swedish Football Association) Rosengård
8	MF	Katrín Ómarsdóttir	27 June 1987 (aged 28)	64	10	(The Football Association) Doncaster Rovers Belles
9	FW	Margrét Lára Viðarsdóttir (captain)	25 July 1986 (aged 29)	102	75	(Football Association of Iceland) Valur
10	MF	Dagný Brynjarsdóttir	10 August 1991 (aged 24)	57	14	(United States Soccer Federation) Portland Thorns
11	DF	Hallbera Guðný Gísladóttir	14 September 1986 (aged 29)	66	1	(Football Association of Iceland) Breiðablik
12	GK	Sandra Sigurðardóttir	2 October 1986 (aged 29)	11	0	(Football Association of Iceland) Valur
13	GK	Sonný Lára Þráinsdóttir	9 December 1986 (aged 29)	1	0	(Football Association of Iceland) Breiðablik
14	DF	Málfríður Erna Sigurðardóttir	30 May 1984 (aged 31)	23	0	(Football Association of Iceland) Breiðablik
15	MF	Sandra Jessen	18 January 1995 (aged 21)	11	5	(German Football Association) Bayer Leverkusen
16	FW	Harpa Þorsteinsdóttir	27 June 1986 (aged 29)	54	11	(Football Association of Iceland) Stjarnan
17	DF	Elísa Viðarsdóttir	26 May 1991 (aged 24)	22	0	(Football Association of Iceland) Valur
18	DF	Guðrún Arnardóttir	29 July 1995 (aged 20)	2	0	(Football Association of Iceland) Breiðablik
19	DF	Anna Björk Kristjánsdóttir	14 October 1989 (aged 26)	16	0	(Swedish Football Association) Örebro
20	FW	Berglind Björg Þorvaldsdóttir	18 January 1992 (aged 24)	10	0	(Football Association of Iceland) Fylkir
21	MF	Andrea Rán Hauksdóttir	28 January 1996 (aged 20)	1	1	(Football Association of Iceland) Breiðablik
22	MF	Elín Metta Jensen	1 March 1995 (aged 21)	13	2	(Football Association of Iceland) Valur
23	MF	Fanndís Friðriksdóttir	9 May 1990 (aged 25)	64	5	(Football Association of Iceland) Breiðablik

== Group B ==
=== Brazil ===
Brazil announced their squad on 22 February 2016.

Head coach: Vadão

No.	Pos.	Player	Date of birth (age)	Caps	Goals	Club
1	GK	Bárbara	4 July 1988 (aged 27)	34	0	(Brazilian Football Confederation) Foz Cataratas
2	DF	Fabiana	4 August 1989 (aged 26)	69	7	(Chinese Football Association) Dalian Quanjian
3	DF	Mônica	21 April 1987 (aged 28)	21	4	(United States Soccer Federation) Orlando Pride
4	DF	Rafaelle	18 June 1991 (aged 24)	22	2	(Chinese Football Association) Changchun Zhuoyue
6	DF	Tamires	10 October 1987 (aged 28)	49	3	(Danish Football Association) Fortuna Hjørring
5	MF	Thaisa	17 December 1988 (aged 27)	42	3	(Brazilian Football Confederation) São José
7	FW	Debinha	20 October 1991 (aged 24)	37	15	(Chinese Football Association) Dalian Quanjian
8	MF	Formiga	3 March 1978 (aged 37)	144	24	(Brazilian Football Confederation) São Francisco
9	FW	Andressa Alves	10 November 1992 (aged 23)	52	14	(French Football Federation) Montpellier
10	MF	Marta (captain)	19 February 1986 (aged 30)	102	100	(Swedish Football Association) Rosengård
11	FW	Cristiane	15 May 1985 (aged 30)	117	81	(French Football Federation) Paris Saint-Germain
12	GK	Luciana	24 July 1987 (aged 28)	22	0	(Brazilian Football Confederation) Rio Preto
13	DF	Poliana	6 February 1991 (aged 25)	39	5	(United States Soccer Federation) Houston Dash
14	DF	Érika	4 February 1988 (aged 28)	53	10	(French Football Federation) Paris Saint-Germain
15	DF	Bruna	16 October 1985 (aged 30)	43	4	(Brazilian Football Confederation) Foz Cataratas
16	DF	Rilany	26 June 1986 (aged 29)	17	1	(Brazilian Football Confederation) Iranduba
17	MF	Andressinha	1 May 1995 (aged 20)	31	1	(United States Soccer Federation) Houston Dash
18	MF	Maurine	14 January 1986 (aged 30)	62	8	(Brazilian Football Confederation) Flamengo
19	FW	Gabi Zanotti	28 February 1985 (aged 31)	33	2	(Chinese Football Association) Dalian Quanjian
20	FW	Bia	17 December 1993 (aged 22)	27	4	(Korea Football Association) Hyundai Red Angels
21	FW	Thaís Guedes	20 January 1993 (aged 23)	36	3	(Korea Football Association) Hyundai Red Angels
22	FW	Raquel	21 March 1991 (aged 24)	30	6	(Chinese Football Association) Changchun Zhuoyue
23	GK	Letícia	13 August 1994 (aged 21)	1	0	(Brazilian Football Confederation) Corinthians

=== New Zealand ===
New Zealand announced their squad on 12 February 2016.

Head coach: (England) Tony Readings

No.	Pos.	Player	Date of birth (age)	Caps	Goals	Club
1	GK	Erin Nayler	17 April 1992 (aged 23)	34	0	(New Zealand Football) Norwest United
2	DF	Ria Percival	7 December 1989 (aged 26)	119	11	(German Football Association) USV Jena
3	DF	Anna Green	20 August 1990 (aged 25)	56	7	(Swedish Football Association) Mallbackens
4	MF	Katie Duncan	1 February 1988 (aged 28)	108	1	(Swiss Football Association) Zürich
5	DF	Abby Erceg (captain)	20 November 1989 (aged 26)	119	6	(United States Soccer Federation) Western New York Flash
6	DF	Rebekah Stott	17 June 1993 (aged 22)	45	5	(Football Australia) Melbourne City
7	DF	Ali Riley	30 October 1987 (aged 28)	98	1	(Swedish Football Association) Rosengård
8	FW	Jasmine Pereira	20 July 1996 (aged 19)	12	0	(New Zealand Football) Three Kings United
9	FW	Amber Hearn	28 November 1984 (aged 31)	105	48	(German Football Association) USV Jena
10	FW	Sarah Gregorius	6 August 1987 (aged 28)	72	24	(Japan Football Association) Speranza Osaka-Takatsuki
11	MF	Kirsty Yallop	4 November 1986 (aged 29)	93	12	(Swedish Football Association) Mallbackens
12	MF	Betsy Hassett	4 August 1990 (aged 25)	84	8	(German Football Association) Werder Bremen
13	FW	Rosie White	6 June 1993 (aged 22)	74	14	(The Football Association) Liverpool
14	MF	Katie Bowen	15 April 1994 (aged 21)	30	0	(United States Soccer Federation) Kansas City
15	DF	Meikayla Moore	4 June 1996 (aged 19)	10	0	(New Zealand Football) Norwest United
16	MF	Annalie Longo	1 July 1991 (aged 24)	84	8	(New Zealand Football) Cashmere Technical
18	DF	Catherine Bott	22 April 1989 (aged 26)	2	0	(New Zealand Football) Forrest Hill Milford
20	MF	Daisy Cleverley	30 April 1997 (aged 18)	3	2	(New Zealand Football) Forrest Hill Milford
21	GK	Rebecca Rolls	22 August 1975 (aged 40)	21	0	(New Zealand Football) Three Kings United
23	GK	Cushla Lichtwark	29 November 1980 (aged 35)	0	0	(New Zealand Football) Upper Hutt City
24	MF	Kate Loye	15 May 1993 (aged 22)	1	0	(New Zealand Football) Claudelands Rovers
25	FW	Aimee Phillips	6 May 1991 (aged 24)	2	1	(New Zealand Football) Forrest Hill Milford
26	MF	Grace Jale	10 April 1999 (aged 16)	0	0	(New Zealand Football) Eastern Suburbs

=== Portugal ===
Portugal announced their squad on 22 February 2016.

Head coach: Francisco Neto

No.	Pos.	Player	Date of birth (age)	Caps	Goals	Club
1	GK	Neide Simões	19 July 1988 (aged 27)	58	0	(Portuguese Football Federation) Valadares Gaia
2	DF	Mónica Mendes	16 June 1993 (aged 22)	30	1	(Swiss Football Association) Neunkirch
3	DF	Inês Silva	29 March 1997 (aged 18)	6	0	(Portuguese Football Federation) Fundação Laura Santos
4	DF	Sílvia Rebelo	20 May 1989 (aged 26)	55	1	(Portuguese Football Federation) Fundação Laura Santos
5	DF	Matilde Fidalgo	15 May 1994 (aged 21)	16	0	(Portuguese Football Federation) CF Benfica
6	DF	Rita Fontemanha	13 November 1993 (aged 22)	2	0	(Royal Spanish Football Federation) Atlético Madrid
7	MF	Cláudia Neto (captain)	18 April 1988 (aged 27)	86	9	(Swedish Football Association) Linköping
8	FW	Edite Fernandes	10 October 1979 (aged 36)	127	36	(Portuguese Football Federation) Valadares Gaia
9	FW	Ana Borges	15 June 1990 (aged 25)	75	9	(The Football Association) Chelsea
10	MF	Catarina Almeida	16 September 1988 (aged 27)	2	0	(Portuguese Football Federation) Clube de Albergaria
11	MF	Tatiana Pinto	28 March 1994 (aged 21)	8	0	(The Football Association) Bristol City
12	GK	Patrícia Morais	17 June 1992 (aged 23)	28	0	(French Football Federation) ASPTT Albi
13	MF	Fátima Pinto	16 January 1996 (aged 20)	11	0	(Royal Spanish Football Federation) Santa Teresa
14	MF	Dolores Silva	7 August 1991 (aged 24)	61	7	(German Football Association) USV Jena
15	DF	Carole Costa	3 May 1990 (aged 25)	65	6	(German Football Association) BV Cloppenburg
16	FW	Diana Silva	4 June 1995 (aged 20)	7	0	(Portuguese Football Federation) Clube de Albergaria
17	MF	Vanessa Marques	12 April 1996 (aged 19)	26	2	(Portuguese Football Federation) Valadares Gaia
18	FW	Carolina Mendes	27 November 1987 (aged 28)	48	9	(Russian Football Union) Rossiyanka
19	MF	Amanda da Costa	7 October 1989 (aged 26)	3	0	(United States Soccer Federation) Chicago Red Stars
20	FW	Suzane Pires	17 August 1992 (aged 23)	4	0	(Brazilian Football Confederation) Santos
21	FW	Solange Carvalhas	22 April 1992 (aged 23)	2	0	(Royal Belgian Football Association) Anderlecht
22	DF	Raquel Infante	19 September 1990 (aged 25)	5	0	(Football Association of Finland) Åland United
23	DF	Filipa Rodrigues	4 September 1993 (aged 22)	13	3	(Portuguese Football Federation) Atlético Ouriense

=== Russia ===
Russia announced their squad on 21 February 2016.

Head coach: Elena Fomina

No.	Pos.	Player	Date of birth (age)	Caps	Goals	Club
1	GK	Elvira Todua	31 January 1986 (aged 30)	85	0	(Russian Football Union) Rossiyanka
2	DF	Yulia Gordeeva	5 January 1988 (aged 28)	8	0	(Russian Football Union) Chertanovo Moscow
3	DF	Anna Kozhnikova	10 July 1987 (aged 28)	54	4	(Russian Football Union) Rossiyanka
4	DF	Lyubov Kipyatkova	3 February 1991 (aged 25)	2	0	(Russian Football Union) Zvezda-2005 Perm
5	DF	Elvira Ziyastinova	13 February 1991 (aged 25)	1	0	(Russian Football Union) Rossiyanka
6	FW	Olesya Kurochkina	6 September 1983 (aged 32)	51	19	(Russian Football Union) Zvezda-2005 Perm
7	DF	Ekaterina Dmitrienko	16 January 1990 (aged 26)	19	0	(Russian Football Union) Rossiyanka
8	DF	Daria Makarenko	7 March 1992 (aged 23)	30	1	(Russian Football Union) Zvezda-2005 Perm
9	FW	Anna Cholovyaga	8 May 1992 (aged 23)	27	3	(Russian Football Union) Rossiyanka
10	MF	Elena Terekhova	5 July 1987 (aged 28)	66	7	(Russian Football Union) Rossiyanka
11	MF	Ekaterina Sochneva	12 August 1985 (aged 30)	71	19	(Russian Football Union) Rossiyanka
12	GK	Elena Kochneva	27 August 1989 (aged 26)	17	0	(Russian Football Union) Zvezda-2005 Perm
13	MF	Elena Kostareva	9 July 1992 (aged 23)	6	0	(Russian Football Union) Kubanochka Krasnodar
14	MF	Olesya Mashina	8 October 1987 (aged 28)	22	4	(Russian Football Union) Rossiyanka
15	FW	Nadezhda Smirnova	22 February 1996 (aged 20)	0	0	(Russian Football Union) Rossiyanka
16	MF	Anastasia Pozdeeva	12 June 1993 (aged 22)	8	0	(Russian Football Union) Zvezda-2005 Perm
17	FW	Ekaterina Pantyukhina	9 April 1993 (aged 22)	18	7	(Russian Football Union) Zvezda-2005 Perm
18	DF	Elena Medved	23 January 1985 (aged 31)	44	2	(Russian Football Union) Ryazan-VDV
19	DF	Ksenia Tsybutovich (captain)	26 June 1987 (aged 28)	75	6	(Russian Football Union) Ryazan-VDV
20	FW	Margarita Chernomyrdina	6 March 1996 (aged 19)	4	0	(Russian Football Union) Chertanovo Moscow
21	GK	Yulia Grichenko	10 March 1990 (aged 25)	5	0	(Russian Football Union) Rossiyanka
22	FW	Elena Danilova	17 June 1987 (aged 28)	24	9	(Russian Football Union) Ryazan-VDV
23	MF	Elena Morozova	15 March 1987 (aged 28)	74	15	(Russian Football Union) Rossiyanka

== Player representation ==
=== By club ===
Clubs with 5 or more players represented are listed.

Players	Club
12	(Russia) Rossiyanka
8	(Denmark) Brøndby
6	(Belgium) Anderlecht, (Belgium) Lierse, (Denmark) Fortuna Hjørring, (Iceland) Breiðablik, (Russia) Zvezda-2005 Perm
5	(Belgium) Standard Liège, (Iceland) Valur

=== By club nationality ===
Players	Clubs
23	Russia
22	United States
19	Belgium
17	Denmark
14	Iceland, Sweden
11	New Zealand
10	Germany
9	Brazil, Portugal
5	China, France
4	England
3	Canada, Norway
2	South Korea, Spain, Switzerland
1	Australia, Finland, Japan, Netherlands

=== By club federation ===
Players	Federation
125	UEFA
25	CONCACAF
11	OFC
9	AFC
9	CONMEBOL

=== By representatives of domestic league ===
National squad	Players
Russia	23
Belgium	18
Denmark	16
Iceland	14
New Zealand	11
Portugal	9
Brazil	8
Canada	3
