= Portugal women's national football team =

Women's national association football team representing Portugal

Portugal
- Nickname(s): A Selecção das Quinas; As Navegadoras
- Association: Portuguese Football Federation (FPF)
- Confederation: UEFA (Europe)
- Head coach: Francisco Neto
- Captain: Dolores Silva
- Most caps: Carole Costa (191)
- Top scorer: Edite Fernandes (39)
- FIFA code: POR
First colours	Second colours

FIFA ranking
- Current: 24 ▼2 (20 October 2026)
- Highest: 19 (August 2023)
- Lowest: 47 (March 2007; October 2007 – March 2008)

First international
- France 0–0 Portugal (Le Mans, France; 24 October 1981)

Biggest win
- Armenia 0–8 Portugal (Yerevan, Armenia; 17 September 2011); Portugal 8–0 Moldova (Setúbal, Portugal; 24 November 2017)

Biggest defeat
- Germany 13–0 Portugal (Reutlingen, Germany; 15 November 2003)

World Cup
- Appearances: 1 (first in 2023)
- Best result: Group stage (2023)

European Championship
- Appearances: 3 (first in 2017)
- Best result: Group stage (2017, 2022, 2025)

The Portugal women's national football team (Portuguese: Seleção Portuguesa de Futebol Feminino) represents Portugal in international women's football competition. The team is controlled by the Portuguese Football Federation (FPF) and competes as a member of UEFA in various international football tournaments such as the FIFA Women's World Cup, UEFA Women's Euro, the Summer Olympics, and the Algarve Cup.

== History ==
The Portuguese women's team historically was one of the weakest in Western Europe since its formation. In recent years however the team has made major strides, qualifying for the newly expanded UEFA Women's Euro 2017, marking the team's first appearance in a major tournament. Despite ultimately finishing last in their group, the team put in a respectable performance, picking up a win in their second match against a Scottish side which had been favored to beat them, and only losing to England by one goal.

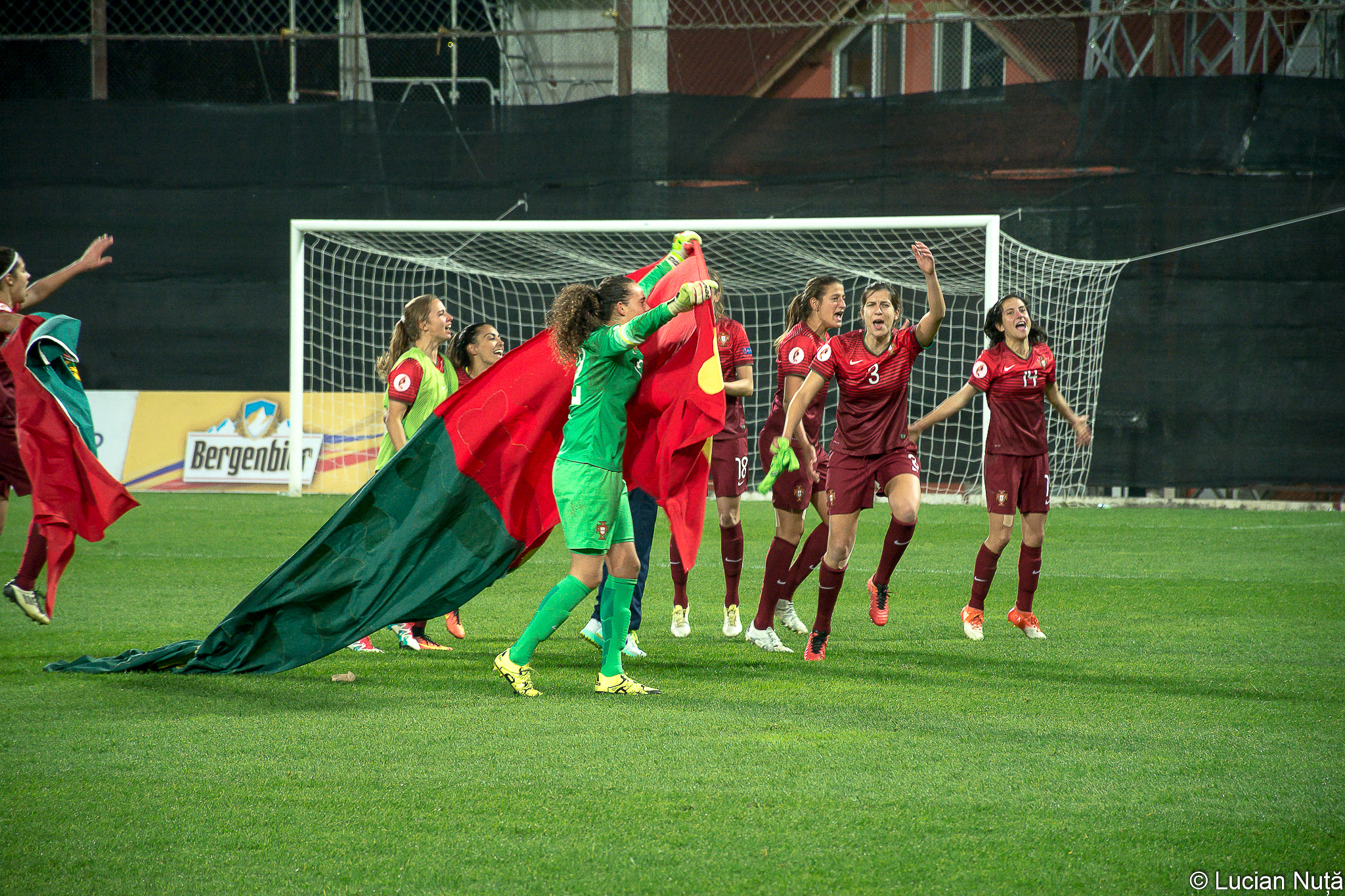
Portuguese players celebrating

After finishing a distant third in their qualifying group for the 2019 FIFA Women's World Cup behind Italy and Belgium and failing to qualify, the Portuguese team then looked forward to trying to repeat their achievement of four years prior by qualifying for UEFA Women's Euro 2022, which they eventually did under quite unusual circumstances. After a strong group stage campaign in which Portugal won all its games except for the two games against group winner Finland, including beating the heavily favored top seed Scotland both home and away, the team reached the play-off stage where they were drawn against Russia. The team came agonizingly close as they narrowly lost the first game in Portugal 0–1 before managing a goalless draw in the second leg in Russia. As a result Russia originally qualified for the Euro, but due to the 2022 Russian invasion of Ukraine all Russian representative teams were banned from competition by FIFA, thus giving Portugal a reprieve as they took Russia's place in Group C of the Women's Euro. Portugal is placed in group C with Sweden, the Netherlands and Switzerland as opponents. They were eliminated in the first round, finishing last with a point obtained thanks to a draw against Switzerland (2–2 after being 0–2 down and having dominated the game overall), and two defeats against the favorites of the group (a close one 2–3 against the Dutch title holders after having recovered a two-goal handicap for a while, then a much heavier defeat 0–5 against Sweden).

Portugal qualified for their first World Cup at the 2023 edition after beating Cameroon 2–1 at the International playoff Final. They are placed in a particularly strong group E, in the company of the United States (double world champions in title), the Netherlands (winner of the Euro 2017 and vice-world champions), as well as Vietnam. On July 23, 2023, the Portuguese played their first World Cup match against the Netherlands at the end of which they lost (0–1). The following match on July 27, the Portuguese signed their first victory in the World Cup against Vietnam (2–0 victory), notably thanks to Telma Encarnação who became the first Portuguese scorer in the World Cup. In doing so, the Lusitanians preserved their chances of qualifying for the round of 16 leaving them in a must win scenario the Americans, who were provisionally ahead of them by one point, in the last group match. The Seleçao hung against all odds on their opponent, having had opportunities to score the winning goal including a shot hitting the post in the dying moments of the game. Ultimately, they did not succeed in passing the first round drawing 0–0, and finished the World Cup in 3rd place in its group with 4 points in its first participation.

Established in 2022, the first edition of the Women's Nations League will kick off in September 2023. As such, the Portuguese women's team will take part in this new competition in League A and have been placed in a particularly challenging Group 2 alongside France, Austria, and Norway.

On September 22, 2023, the Portuguese team played their first match in this new competition against France, which they lost 2–0. However, the Portuguese team managed to pull off a feat four days later by defeating Norway (3–2), marking their first historic victory in this competition. Subsequently, the Portuguese lost every match and finished last in their group with a record of one win in six matches, resulting in relegation to League B.

== Team image ==
=== Nicknames ===
The Portugal women's national football team has been known or nicknamed as "A Selecção das Quinas".

== Results and fixtures ==
The following is a list of match results in the last 12 months, as well as any future matches that have been scheduled.

Legend

Win Draw Loss Fixture

=== 2025 ===
28 November Friendly	Portugal	1–2	Netherlands	Braga, Portugal
20:45				Stadium: Estadio Municipal de Braga

2 December Friendly	Portugal	0–5	Brazil	Aveiro, Portugal
19:45 WET (UTC+0)		Report	Gabi Zanotti 1'; Ludmila 16'; Dudinha 37'; Isabela 73'; Bia Zaneratto 90' (pen.)	Stadium: Estádio Municipal de Aveiro; Attendance: 15,323; Referee: Riem Hussein (Germany)

=== 2026 ===
3 March 2027 FIFA Women's World Cup qualification	Portugal	2–0	Finland	Pacos de Ferreira, Portugal
18:45 (17:45 UTC)	Alves 90+1'; Santiago 90+4'	Report (FIFA); Report (UEFA)		Stadium: Estádio Capital do Móvel; Referee: Franziska Wildfeuer (Germany)

7 March 2027 FIFA Women's World Cup qualification	Portugal	4–0	Slovakia	Barcelos, Portugal
16:00 (15:00 UTC)	Capeta 19', 44'; Santiago 48'; J. Silva 74'	Report (FIFA); Report (UEFA)		Stadium: Estádio Cidade de Barcelos; Attendance: 5,156; Referee: Martina Molinaro (Italy)

14 April 2027 FIFA Women's World Cup qualification	Latvia	0–3	Portugal	Riga, Latvia
19:00 (20:00 UTC+3)		Report (FIFA); Report (UEFA)	Nazareth 14', 73'; T. Pinto 18'	Stadium: Daugava Stadium; Attendance: 533; Referee: Laura Mauricio (Switzerland)

18 April 2027 FIFA Women's World Cup qualification	Slovakia	1–2	Portugal	Prešov, Slovakia
16:00	Fabová 8'	Report (FIFA); Report (UEFA)	Santiago 37'; Nazareth 42'	Stadium: Futbal Tatran Arena; Referee: Maïka Vanderstichel (France)

5 June 2027 FIFA Women's World Cup qualification	Portugal	5–0	Latvia	Estoril, Portugal
20:00	Santiago 47'; Capeta 54'; Nazareth 61', 63'; Silva 84'	Report (FIFA); Report (UEFA)		Stadium: Estádio António Coimbra da Mota; Attendance: 2,531; Referee: Olivia Tschon (Austria)

9 June 2027 FIFA Women's World Cup qualification	Finland	3–1	Portugal	Tampere, Finland
20:00	Lehtola 12', 47'; Nyström 79'	Report (FIFA); Report (UEFA)	Nazareth 29'	Stadium: Tammelan Stadion; Attendance: 7,078; Referee: Merima Čelik (Bosnia and Herzegovina)

9 October 2026 2027 FIFA Women's World Cup qualification	Northern Ireland	0–4	Portugal	Larne, Northern Ireland
20:00 (19:00 UTC+1)		Report (FIFA); Report (UEFA)	Encarnação 8'; J. Silva 22'; Holloway 28' (o.g.); F. Pinto 83'	Stadium: Inver Park; Attendance: 1,432; Referee: Iuliana Demetrescu (Romania)

13 October 2026 2027 FIFA Women's World Cup qualification	Portugal	3–1	Northern Ireland	Portimão
20:15 (19:15 UTC+1)	Santiago 45+2'; Silva 74'; Costa 83'	Report (FIFA); Report (UEFA)	Elmore 31'	Stadium: Estádio Municipal de Portimão; Referee: Silvia Gasperotti (Italy)

November 2027 FIFA Women's World Cup qualification	Portugal	v	Iceland	Portugal

December 2027 FIFA Women's World Cup qualification	Iceland	v	Portugal

- Fixtures and Results, FPF.pt

== Coaching staff ==
=== Current coaching staff ===
As of 8 November 2024.

Position	Name
Head coach	(Portugal) Francisco Neto
Assistant coach	(Portugal) Luis Marques (Portugal) Rita Goncalves (Portugal) Joana Tilly
Goalkeeping coach	(Portugal) Nuno Raphael

=== Manager history ===
- (Portugal) Francisco Neto (2014–present)

== Players ==
=== Current squad ===
The following players were called up for the 2027 FIFA Women's World Cup qualification matches against Latvia and Finland on 5 and 9 June 2026, respectively.

Caps and goals correct as of 9 June 2026, after the match against Finland.

No.	Pos.	Player	Date of birth (age)	Caps	Goals	Club
1	GK	Inês Pereira	26 May 1999 (age 27)	55	0	(Royal Spanish Football Federation) Deportivo La Coruña
12	GK	Patrícia Morais	17 June 1992 (age 34)	104	0	(Portuguese Football Federation) Braga
22	GK	Catarina Potra	31 July 2005 (age 21)	0	0	(Portuguese Football Federation) Sporting CP
2	DF	Catarina Amado	21 July 1999 (age 27)	60	2	(Portuguese Football Federation) Benfica
5	DF	Nelly Rodrigues	27 May 2003 (age 23)	4	0	(French Football Federation) Nantes
8	DF	Alice Marques	4 May 2005 (age 21)	1	0	(Royal Spanish Football Federation) Sevilla
15	DF	Carole Costa	3 May 1990 (age 36)	191	25	(Portuguese Football Federation) Benfica
18	DF	Carolina Correia	3 April 2002 (age 24)	8	0	(Portuguese Football Federation) Torreense
19	DF	Diana Gomes	26 July 1998 (age 28)	68	8	(Portuguese Football Federation) Benfica
	DF	Morgane Martins	3 January 1998 (age 28)	0	0	(French Football Federation) FC Fleury 91
4	MF	Pauleta	11 August 1997 (age 29)	4	0	(Portuguese Football Federation) Benfica
6	MF	Andreia Jacinto	8 June 2002 (age 24)	62	1	(Royal Spanish Football Federation) Real Sociedad
7	MF	Francisca Nazareth	17 November 2002 (age 24)	54	16	(Royal Spanish Football Federation) Barcelona
11	MF	Tatiana Pinto	28 March 1994 (age 32)	137	8	(Italian Football Federation) Juventus
13	MF	Fátima Pinto	16 January 1996 (age 30)	102	5	(French Football Federation) Strasbourg
14	MF	Dolores Silva (captain)	7 August 1991 (age 35)	183	19	(Royal Spanish Football Federation) Levante
16	MF	Andreia Faria	19 April 2000 (age 26)	43	3	(Saudi Arabian Football Federation) Al-Nassr
23	MF	Nádia Bravo	29 November 2004 (age 21)	5	0	(Portuguese Football Federation) Braga
	MF	Andreia Bravo	26 March 2005 (age 21)	2	0	(Portuguese Football Federation) Sporting CP
3	FW	Lúcia Alves	22 October 1997 (age 29)	35	3	(Portuguese Football Federation) Benfica
9	FW	Carolina Santiago	31 August 2006 (age 20)	9	4	(Portuguese Football Federation) Sporting CP
10	FW	Jéssica Silva	11 December 1994 (age 31)	135	20	(Saudi Arabian Football Federation) Al Hilal
17	FW	Maísa Correia	11 October 2006 (age 20)	3	0	(Portuguese Football Federation) Sporting CP
20	FW	Nádia Gomes	9 November 1996 (age 30)	3	1	(United States Soccer Federation) Chicago Red Stars
21	FW	Ana Capeta	22 December 1997 (age 28)	59	14	(Italian Football Federation) Juventus

=== Recent call-ups ===
The following players have also been called up to the squad within the past 12 months.

Pos.	Player	Date of birth (age)	Caps	Goals	Club	Latest call-up
GK	Rute Costa ^{WD}	1 June 1994 (age 32)	8	0	(Portugal) Torreense	v. Latvia, 5 June 2026
GK	Sierra Cota-Yarde	4 July 2003 (age 23)	1	0	(Canada) AFC Toronto	v. Slovakia, 18 April 2026
DF	Joana Marchão ^{INJ}	24 October 1996 (age 30)	58	3	(Switzerland) Servette	v. Latvia, 5 June 2026
DF	Beatriz Fonseca	15 September 1998 (age 28)	10	1	(Portugal) Sporting CP	v. Slovakia, 18 April 2026
DF	Bárbara Lopes	15 January 2002 (age 24)	1	0	(Portugal) Torreense	v. Slovakia, 18 April 2026
DF	Daniela Areia Santos	26 December 2006 (age 19)	1	0	(Portugal) Valadares Gaia	v. Slovakia, 18 April 2026
DF	Érica Cancelinha	26 December 2006 (age 19)	1	0	(Portugal) Sporting CP	v. Brazil, 2 December 2025
MF	Raquel Ferreira	7 February 2002 (age 24)	1	0	(Portugal) Torreense	v. Slovakia, 18 April 2026
MF	Maria Alagoa	21 April 2003 (age 23)	3	0	(United States) Florida State Seminoles	v. Brazil, 2 December 2025
FW	Diana Silva ^{WD}	4 June 1995 (age 31)	125	26	(Portugal) Benfica	v. Latvia, 5 June 2026
FW	Telma Encarnação	11 October 2001 (age 25)	44	8	(Portugal) Sporting CP	v. Brazil, 2 December 2025
FW	Stephanie Ribeiro	10 June 1994 (age 32)	5	1	(Mexico) UNAM	v. United States, 26 October 2025
Notes: ^{INJ} = Withdrew due to injury; ^{MED} = Withdrew due to medical reasons; ^{PRE} = Preliminary squad / standby; ^{WD} = Withdrew due to personal reasons

=== Previous squads ===
FIFA Women's World Cup

- 2023 FIFA Women's World Cup squad

UEFA European Women's Championship

- UEFA Women's Euro 2017 squad
- UEFA Women's Euro 2022 squad
- UEFA Women's Euro 2025 squad

Algarve Cup

- Algarve Cup 2013 squad
- Algarve Cup 2014 squad
- Algarve Cup 2015 squad
- Algarve Cup 2016 squad
- Algarve Cup 2017 squad
- Algarve Cup 2018 squad
- Algarve Cup 2019 squad
- Algarve Cup 2020 squad

== Records ==
As of 9 June 2026

Players in bold are still active with the national team.

=== Most Appearances ===
Rank	Player	Career	Caps	Goals
1	**Carole Costa**	2010–present	191	25
2	**Ana Borges**	2009–present	187	11
3	**Dolores Silva**	2009–present	183	19
4	Carla Couto	1993–2012	145	29
5	**Tatiana Pinto**	2014–present	137	8
6	Cláudia Neto	2006–2021	136	19
7	**Jéssica Silva**	2011–present	135	20
8	Edite Fernandes	1997–2016	132	39
9	**Diana Silva**	2014–present	125	26
10	**Carolina Mendes**	2007–present	124	24
10	Sílvia Rebelo	2009–2024	124	2

=== Top goalscorers ===
Rank	Player	Career	Goals	Caps	Avg.
1	Edite Fernandes	1997–2016	39	132	0.30
2	Carla Couto	1993–2012	29	145	0.20
3	**Diana Silva**	2014–present	26	125	0.21
4	**Carole Costa**	2010–present	25	191	0.13
5	**Carolina Mendes**	2007–present	24	124	0.19
6	**Jéssica Silva**	2011–present	20	135	0.15
7	Cláudia Neto	2006–2021	19	136	0.14
7	**Dolores Silva**	2009–present	19	183	0.10
9	**Francisca Nazareth**	2020–present	16	54	0.30
9	**Ana Capeta**	2014–present	14	59	0.24
9	Patrícia Sequeira	1993–2002	13	75	0.17

== Competitive record ==
=== FIFA Women's World Cup ===
FIFA Women's World Cup record									Qualification record					
Year	Round	Position	Pld	W	D	L	GF	GA	Pld	W	D	L	GF	GA
(China) 1991	Did not enter								1991 UEFA Women's Championship					
(Sweden) 1995	Did not qualify								UEFA Women's Euro 1995					
(United States) 1999	Did not qualify								6	2	0	4	4	15
(United States) 2003	Did not qualify								6	1	1	4	4	26
(China) 2007	Did not qualify								8	0	0	8	4	31
(Germany) 2011	Did not qualify								8	4	0	4	17	10
(Canada) 2015	Did not qualify								10	4	0	6	19	21
(France) 2019	Did not qualify								8	3	2	3	22	8
(Australia) (New Zealand) 2023	Group stage	19th	3	1	1	1	2	1	13	10	1	2	34	12
(Brazil) 2027	To be determined								To be determined					
(Costa Rica) (Jamaica) (Mexico) (United States) 2031	To be determined								To be determined					
(United Kingdom) 2035	To be determined								To be determined					
Total		1/10	3	1	1	1	2	1	59	24	4	31	104	123

*Draws include knockout matches decided via penalty shoot-out.

=== UEFA European Women's Championship ===
UEFA Women's Championship record									Qualification record							
Year	Round	Pos	Pld	W	D*	L	GF	GA	Pld	W	D	L	GF	GA	P/R	Rnk
1984	Did not qualify								6	0	2	4	1	10	–	
(Norway) 1987	Did not enter								Did not enter							
(West Germany) 1989	Did not enter								Did not enter							
(Denmark) 1991	Did not enter								Did not enter							
(Italy) 1993	Did not enter								Did not enter							
(Germany) 1995	Did not qualify								6	3	0	3	13	11	–	
(Norway) (Sweden) 1997	Did not qualify								8	2	0	6	5	26	–	
(Germany) 2001	Did not qualify								8	2	1	5	5	17	–	
(England) 2005	Did not qualify								8	1	0	7	5	42	–	
(Finland) 2009	Did not qualify								8	0	2	6	4	18	–	
(Sweden) 2013	Did not qualify								8	2	0	6	16	13	–	
(Netherlands) 2017	Group stage	14th	3	1	0	2	3	5	10	4	3	3	16	12	–	
(England) 2022	Group stage	14th	3	0	1	2	4	10	10	6	2	2	10	3	–	
(Switzerland) 2025	Group stage	13th	3	0	1	2	2	8	10	8	2	0	25	5	▲ (Note: From Euro 2025 onwards a new qualifying format was introduced, linked to the Women's Nations League where teams are divided into leagues with promotion/relegation between the leagues at the end of each cycle.)	17th
Total	Group stage	3/14	9	1	2	5	9	23	76	28	10	38	108	147	17th	

*Draws include knockout matches decided on penalty kicks.

1. Portugal originally failed to qualify after losing to Russia in the play-offs, but Russia was banned from FIFA and UEFA International matches after invading Ukraine (28 February 2022). On 2 May, Portugal was declared as the replacement.

=== UEFA Women's Nations League ===
UEFA Women's Nations League record
League phase												Finals							
Season	LG	Grp	Pos	Pld	W	D	L	GF	GA	P/R	Rnk	Year	Pos	Pld	W	D	L	GF	GA
2023–24	A	2	4th	6	1	0	5	5	13	▼	13th	(Europe) 2024	Did not qualify						
2025	A	3	4th	6	1	1	4	5	21	▼	13th	(Europe) 2025	To be determined						
Total				12	2	1	9	10	34	13th		Total	–	–	–	–	–	–	–

▲	Promoted at end of season
Same position	No movement at end of season
▼	Relegated at end of season
*	Participated in promotion/relegation play-offs

=== Algarve Cup ===
The Algarve Cup is an invitational tournament for national teams in women's association football hosted by the Portuguese Football Federation (FPF). Held annually in the Algarve region of Portugal since 1994, it is one of the most prestigious and longest-running women's international football events and has been nicknamed the "Mini FIFA Women's World Cup."

Algarve Cup record
Year	Result	Matches	Wins	Draws	Losses	GF	GA
1994	5th/6	3	1	0	2	2	8
1995	8th/8	4	0	0	4	1	14
1996	7th/8	4	1	0	3	4	10
1997	8th/8	4	0	1	3	0	8
1998	8th/8	4	0	1	3	3	8
1999	7th/8	4	1	1	2	2	10
2000	8th/8	4	0	0	4	1	17
2001	8th/8	4	0	0	4	3	11
2002	11th/12	4	1	0	3	6	10
2003	10th/12	4	1	2	1	5	5
2004	10th/12	4	2	0	2	7	4
2005	11th/12	4	1	0	3	5	9
2006	11th/11	2	0	0	2	0	7
2007	12th/12	4	0	2	2	2	7
2008	10th/12	4	2	1	1	6	5
2009	8th/12	4	3	1	0	6	3
2010	10th/12	4	2	1	1	7	4
2011	9th/12	4	2	2	0	6	3
2012	10th/12	4	2	0	2	6	3
2013	11th/12	4	1	1	2	3	6
2014	12th/12	4	1	0	3	5	9
2015	11th/12	4	0	2	2	5	9
2016	8th/8	4	0	0	4	2	8
2017	12th/12	4	0	1	3	0	9
2018	3rd/12	4	3	1	0	6	2
2019	12th/12	3	1	0	2	4	8
2020	8th/8	3	0	0	3	1	5
2021	Cancelled because of the COVID-19 pandemic						
2022	4th/5	3	1	0	2	2	6
Total	–	106	26	18	52	97	204

=== Torneio Internacional de Futebol Feminino ===
(Brazil) Torneio Internacional de Futebol Feminino record
Year	Result	Position	Matches	Wins	Draws	Losses	GF	GA
(Brazil) 2012	Fourth place	4th	4	1	1	2	1	6
Total	1/1	0 titles	4	1	1	2	1	6
