= Sonný Lára Þráinsdóttir =

Icelandic footballer

Personal information
- Date of birth: 9 December 1986 (age 39)
- Place of birth: Iceland
- Height: 1.84 m (6 ft 0 in)
- Position: Goalkeeper

Senior career*
Years	Team	Apps	(Gls)
2002–2008	Fjölnir	61	(0)
2009	Afturelding/Fjölnir	18	(0)
2010	Haukar	18	(0)
2011–2013	Fjölnir	42	(5)
2014–2020	Breiðablik	122	(0)

International career^{‡}
2015	Iceland U23	1	(0)
2016–2019	Iceland	7	(0)
- * Club domestic league appearances and goals as of 5 January 2021 ‡ National team caps and goals as of 5 January 2021

Sonný Lára Þráinsdóttir (born 9 December 1986) is an Icelandic former footballer who played as a goalkeeper.

== Career ==
=== Club ===
Sonný Lára started career in 2002 with Fjölnir. Despite being a goalkeeper, she scored 5 goals during the 2013 season as Fjölnir's designated penalty taker. By 2017, she recorded 107 appearances in the league, for three different teams.

In January 2021, Sonný announced her retirement from football.

=== International ===
Sonný Lára started her international career on 15 January 2015, in a match for Iceland U23 against Poland. On 14 February 2016, she debuted for Iceland Senior Team in a tie again against Poland. On 22 June 2017, she was included by coach Freyr Alexandersson on the group of 23 women who represented Iceland at the UEFA Women's Euro 2017.
