= Sílvia Rebelo =

Portuguese footballer (born 1989)

Personal information
- Full name: Sílvia Marisa Garcia Rebelo
- Date of birth: 20 May 1989 (age 37)
- Place of birth: Gouveia, Portugal
- Height: 1.73 m (5 ft 8 in)
- Position: Defender

Youth career
- 2003–2009: Fundação Laura Santos

Senior career*
Years	Team	Apps	(Gls)
2009–2016	Fundação Laura Santos	33	(16)
2016–2018	Braga	43	(6)
2018–2024	Benfica	86	(12)

International career
2006–2008	Portugal U19	14	(0)
2009–2024	Portugal	124	(2)
- * Club domestic league appearances and goals

Sílvia Marisa Garcia Rebelo (born 20 May 1989) is a former Portuguese professional footballer who played as a defender.

== Career ==
=== Club ===
Rebelo started to play football at early age. She started her career at the "Fundação Laura Santos" in 2009. Despite having more than 50 international caps for Portugal, Rebelo used to work in the Fundação Laura Santos' laundry while playing for their team in the Portuguese semi-professional league. She used to work eight hours a day as a laundry woman and train in the night. Rebelo also used to train with the C. D. Gouveia's men's team. On 31 July 2016 Rebelo moved to S.C. Braga. In 2016, the Portuguese Football Federation nominated Rebelo to the "Player of the Year" award. In June 2018, Rebelo moved to the newly formed S.L. Benfica team.

Rebelo retired from football on 1 July 2024 and joined Benfica women's team structure.

=== International ===
Rebelo played for Portugal at the 2007 UEFA Women's Under-19 Championship and the 2008 UEFA Women's Under-19 Championship Qualifying Stages. On 23 September 2009, in a qualification match against Italy, she debuted for Portugal Senior Team. On 31 March 2010, in a win against Armenia, Rebelo scored her first and only, to date, international goal. On 6 July 2017 Rebelo was called by coach Francisco Neto to represent Portugal at the UEFA Women's Euro 2017, the first time the Portuguese team reached the final stage of a big international tournament. She played every minute of the three matches Portugal played in tournament as her team was eliminated still in Group Stage. On 23 October 2020, Rebelo played her 100th match for Portugal in a 3–0 win over Cyprus in the UEFA Women's Euro 2021 qualifying.

On 30 May 2023, she was included in the 23-player squad for the FIFA Women's World Cup 2023.

== International goals ==
No.	Date	Venue	Opponent	Score	Result	Competition
1.	31 March 2010	Complexo Desportivo da Tocha, Cantanhede, Portugal	Armenia	2–0	7–0	2011 FIFA Women's World Cup qualification
2.	11 November 2022	Estádio Municipal José Martins Vieira, Almada, Portugal	Haiti	3–0	5–0	Friendly

== Honours ==
Benfica

- Campeonato Nacional Feminino: 2020–21, 2021–22, 2022–23, 2023–24
- Campeonato Nacional II Divisão Feminino: 2018–19
- Taça de Portugal: 2018–19, 2023–24
- Taça da Liga: 2019–20, 2020–21, 2022–23, 2023–24
- Supertaça de Portugal: 2019, 2022, 2023
