= Heleen Jaques =

Belgian footballer (born 1988)

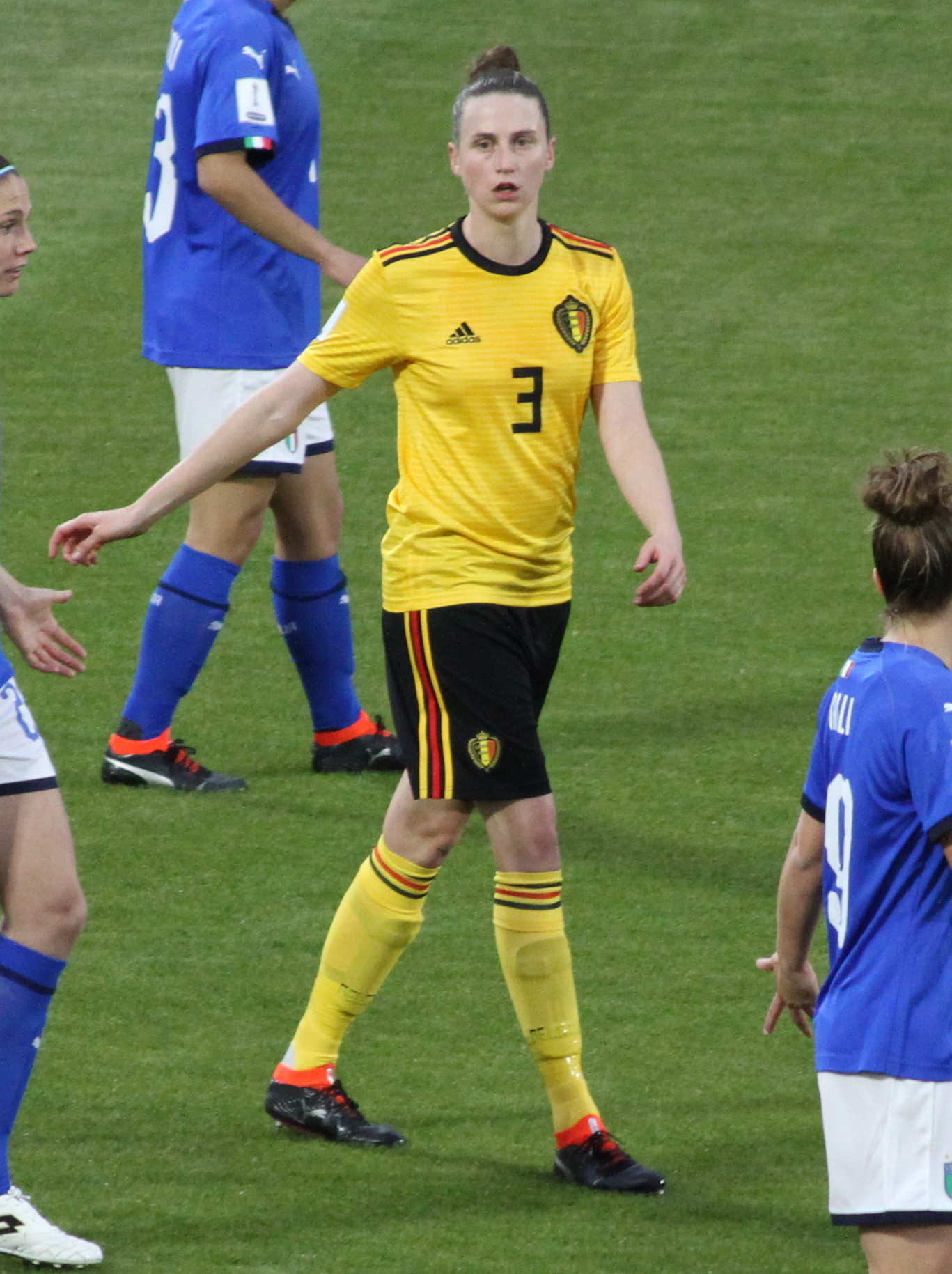
- Jaques in 2018

Personal information
- Date of birth: 20 April 1988 (age 38)
- Place of birth: Tielt, Belgium
- Height: 1.80 m (5 ft 11 in)
- Position: Defender

Senior career*
Years	Team	Apps	(Gls)
2004–2005	Oostende		
2005–2008	Zuid West-Vlaanderen		
2008–2010	Sint-Truiden		
2010–2011	Herforder SV	21	(1)
2011–2012	Sint-Truiden		
2012–2013	Turbine Potsdam	9	(0)
2013–2015	Club Brugge	43	(5)
2015–2018	Anderlecht		
2018–2019	Fiorentina	15	(2)
2019–2020	Sassuolo	2	(0)
2020–2021	Gent	22	(1)

International career
2005	Belgium U17	3	(0)
2005–2007	Belgium U19	9	(0)
2007–2020	Belgium	97	(3)

Managerial career
- 2021–2023: Belgium U16
- 2023–2024: Club YLA
- 2024–2025: KAA Gent (women)
- 2026–: SGS Essen
- * Club domestic league appearances and goals

Heleen Jaques (born 20 April 1988) is a Belgian former footballer who played as a defender for Gent of the Belgian Super League and the Belgium national team.

== Club career ==
Jaques made her Champions League debut in October 2012. She has also played for Herforder SV and Turbine Potsdam of the Bundesliga, and Sint-Truiden, Anderlecht and Club Brugge of the Belgian First Division and BeNe League. She transferred to Fiorentina for the 2018–19 season.

== International career ==
Jaques was a member of the Belgium national team since 2007.

She played her last international game on 1 December 2020 against Switzerland. Coming on as a substitute for Julie Biesmans, she played the last minutes in a 4–0 win for Belgium where they secured qualification for the 2022 UEFA Women's Euro championship.

== Career statistics ==
Scores and results list Belgium's goal tally first, score column indicates score after each Jaques goal.

List of international goals scored by Heleen Jaques
No.	Date	Venue	Opponent	Score	Result	Competition
1	16 September 2015	Proximus Basecamp, Tubize, Belgium	Poland	5–0	5–0	Friendly
2	5 March 2018	GSZ Stadium, Larnaca, Cyprus	Austria	2–0	2–0	Friendly
3	29 August 2019	Den Dreef, Leuven, Belgium	England	1–2	3–3	Friendly
