= Luna Gevitz =

Danish footballer (born 1994)

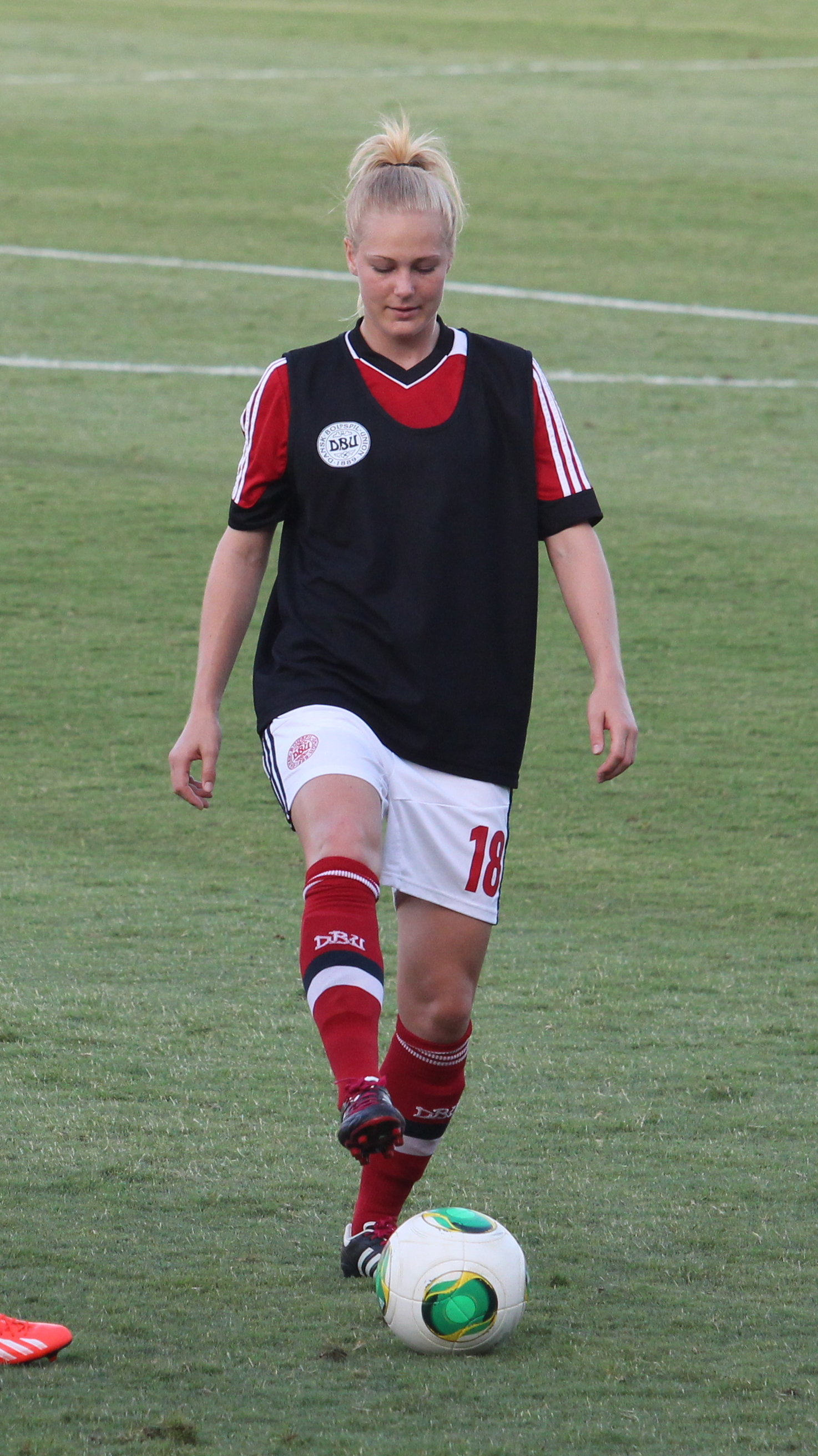
- Gevitz warming up for Denmark in June 2014

Personal information
- Full name: Luna Nørgaard Gevitz
- Date of birth: 3 March 1994 (age 32)
- Place of birth: Aarhus, Denmark
- Height: 1.74 m (5 ft 9 in)
- Position: Defender

Youth career
- Dover GF
- FC Skanderborg

Senior career*
Years	Team	Apps	(Gls)
- IK Skovbakken
2012–2013	Montpellier	2	(1)
2013–2019	Fortuna Hjørring	33	(1)
2019–2021	Guingamp	30	(1)
2021–2022	BK Häcken	33	(1)
2022–2023	Montpellier	29	(3)

International career
2010	Denmark U16	4	(0)
2010–2011	Denmark U17	15	(1)
2011–2013	Denmark U19	28	(5)
2015–2017	Denmark U23	3	(0)
2014–2023	Denmark	25	(0)
Medal record
Women's football
Representing Denmark
UEFA Women's Championship
Silver medal – second place	2017 Netherlands	Team
- * Club domestic league appearances and goals

Luna Nørgaard Gevitz (born 3 March 1994), sometimes written Gewitz, is a Danish former footballer who played as a defender for the Danish national team. Gevitz works as an expert football commentator with the Danish Broadcasting Corporation.

== Club career ==
After beginning her senior career with IK Skovbakken, Gevitz spent the 2012–13 season in France with Montpellier HSC. She signed for Fortuna Hjørring in August 2013, but an ankle injury delayed her debut for her new club until March 2014. In 2019, Gevitz signed for French Division 1 Féminine club Guingamp. She made 14 appearances for them in the 2020–21 Division 1 Féminine season. In February 2021, Gevitz signed for Swedish club BK Häcken.

== International career ==
Gevitz played for Denmark under-19s at the 2012 UEFA Under-19 European Championship. Gevitz made her debut for the senior Denmark national team in June 2014, a 5–0 win over Israel in qualifying for the 2015 FIFA World Cup. She was a member of the Danish squad at the 2017 UEFA European Championship.
