= Cláudia Neto =

Portuguese footballer (born 1988)

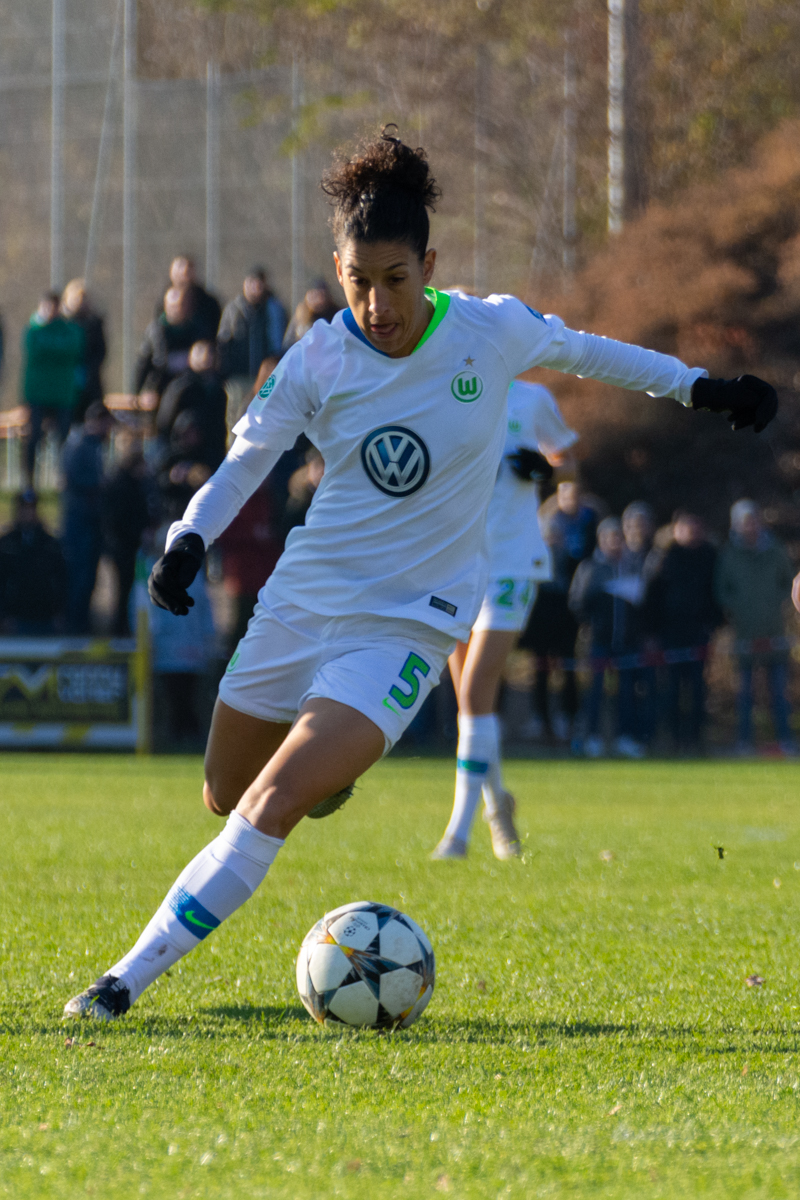
- Cláudia Neto in 2018

Personal information
- Full name: Cláudia Teresa Pires Neto
- Date of birth: 18 April 1988 (age 38)
- Place of birth: Portimão, Portugal
- Height: 1.64 m (5 ft 5 in)
- Position: Midfielder

Team information
- Current team: Sporting CP
- Number: 17

Senior career*
Years	Team	Apps	(Gls)
- União de Lagos (futsal)
2008–2013	Prainsa Zaragoza	135	(13)
2013–2014	RCD Espanyol	24	(1)
2014–2017	Linköping FC	80	(3)
2017–2020	VfL Wolfsburg	26	(1)
2020–2022	Fiorentina	37	(0)
2022–	Sporting CP	35	(15)

International career^{‡}
2006–2021	Portugal	136	(19)
- * Club domestic league appearances and goals as of 5 June 2024 ‡ National team caps and goals as of 25 October 2023

Cláudia Teresa Pires Neto (born 18 April 1988) is a Portuguese footballer who plays as a midfielder for Portuguese Campeonato Nacional Feminino club Sporting CP. She has previously played for Prainsa Zaragoza and RCD Espanyol in the Spanish Primera División, Linköping FC in the Swedish Damallsvenskan, VfL Wolfsburg in the German Frauen-Bundesliga, and Fiorentina in the Italian Serie A.

== Club career ==
=== Spain ===
Neto started playing at the age of twelve futsal with União de Lagos. With them she won all the trophies available in the Algarve Football Association. In 2008, she turned to association football and signed for Prainsa Zaragoza in Spain's Superliga. Five years later, in 2013, she moved to RCD Espanyol, where she played just one season.

=== Linköping FC ===
Neto moved to Sweden and joined Linköping FC in June 2014, signing a one-and-a-half year contract. She was one of the most influential players during the 2014 Damallsvenskan season, contributing with her precise passing and humble character. This led to her signing a two-year contract extension in September 2015. In February 2017, Neto was nominated for the FIFPRO World 11 team. During her time with Linköpings, she helped the club twice win the Svenska Cupen and win the league championship back-to-back in the 2016 and 2017 seasons.

=== Wolfsburg VfL ===
In November 2017, together with Linköpings team-mate Kristine Minde, Neto joined German champions VfL Wolfsburg, signing a contract until June 2019. After exceeding the high expectations the club had of her, they signed her to a one-year contract extension in October 2018, keeping her at the club until June 2020. In all three of her seasons at the club they won both the Frauen-Bundesliga title and the DFB-Pokal Frauen each season.

=== Fiorentina ===
In August 2020, Neto signed with Italian club Fiorentina until 2022.

=== Sporting CP ===
In June 2022, Neto returned to Portugal, after 14 seasons overseas, and signed with Sporting CP. In June 2024, Neto re-signed with Sporting CP for another season after scoring 17 goals in 54 matches since 2022. This kept her the oldest player of the squad.

== International career ==
Neto was called up for Portuguese national youth teams from 2004. In 2006, she made her debut for the Portuguese senior national team, which she later captained, helping guide the team to the 2017 UEFA Women's European Championships. She retired from international football in September 2021, having scored 19 goals in 136 caps since her debut in March 2006.

== Style of play ==
Neto stated that starting off her career playing futsal gave her technique and helped her think and execute faster due to playing in reduced spaces.

== Personal life ==
Neto was born as a premature baby in the Portuguese city Portimão.

== Honours ==
- Damallsvenskan: Winner (2) 2016, 2017
- Svenska Cupen: Winner (2) 2013–14, 2014–15

Individual

- Record Campeonato Nacional Feminino Best XI: 2025–26
