= Francisco Neto =

Portuguese football manager

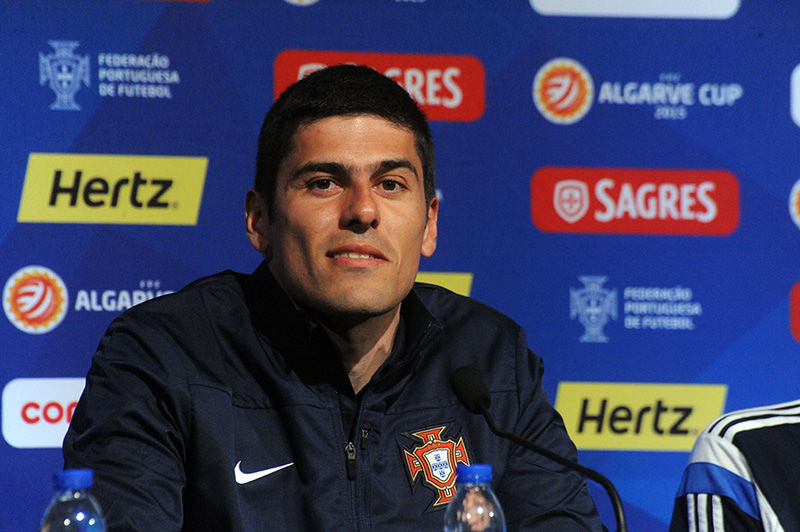
- Francisco Neto at the 2015 Algarve Cup

Personal information
- Full name: Francisco Miguel Conceição Roque Neto
- Date of birth: 11 July 1981 (age 45)
- Place of birth: Mortágua, Portugal

Team information
- Current team: Portugal women

Managerial career
- Years: Team
- 2013–2014: Goa
- 2014–: Portugal women

Francisco Miguel Conceição Roque Neto (Portuguese: [fɾɐ̃ˈsiʃku ˈnɛtu]; born 11 July 1981), known as Francisco Neto or simply Neto, is a Portuguese football manager, currently the head coach of the Portugal women's national football team. For the first time, he led the Portugal national team to Euro 2017.
