= 2025–26 S.L. Benfica (women) =

S.L. Benfica
2025–26 season
- Manager: Ivan Baptista
- Stadium: Estádio Municipal José Martins Vieira; Benfica Campus; Estádio da Luz (selected matches)
- Liga BPI: 4th
- Taça da Liga: Quarter-Finals
- Taça de Portugal: 3rd Round
- Supertaça: Final
- Champions League: League Phase
Home colours	Away colours	Third colours

The 2025–26 Sport Lisboa e Benfica season will be the club's 8th season in existence and its 7th season in the top flight of Portuguese football. Domestically, Benfica will play in the Campeonato Nacional Feminino, and will also compete in the Taça da Liga and Taça de Portugal. In Europe, Benfica will play in the UEFA Champions League.

== Players ==
=== First-team squad ===
As of 6 September 2025

Note: Flags indicate national team as defined under FIFA eligibility rules; some limited exceptions apply. Players may hold more than one non-FIFA nationality.

No.	Pos.	Nation	Player
1	GK	GER	Lena Pauels
2	DF	FRA	Salomé Prat
3	DF	POR	Joana Silva
5	DF	NOR	Marit Lund
6	MF	POR	Beatriz Cameirão
7	FW	ESP	Cristina Martín-Prieto
8	MF	POR	Andreia Norton
9	FW	BRA	Nycole Raysla
10	FW	DEN	Caroline Møller
11	DF	POR	Ana Borges
12	GK	POR	Thaís Lima
13	FW	POR	Lúcia Alves
14	MF	POR	Letícia Almeida
15	DF	POR	Carole Costa

No.	Pos.	Nation	Player
16	DF	NGA	Christy Ucheibe
17	FW	POR	Diana Silva
18	MF	NOR	Rakel Engesvik
19	DF	POR	Catarina Amado
20	FW	POR	Lara Martins
21	MF	ESP	Pauleta
22	DF	POR	Diana Gomes
23	MF	GER	Anna Gasper
25	FW	CAN	Chandra Davidson
28	FW	ESP	Andrea Falcón
31	MF	BRA	Clarinha
56	MF	USA	Carissa Boeckmann
66	GK	POR	Rute Costa
77	FW	POR	Neide Guedes
79	DF	POR	Marta Salvador

== Transfers ==
=== In ===
No.	Pos	Player	Transferred from	Date	Source
Summer transfers
11	DF	(Portugal) Ana Borges	(Portugal) Sporting	1 July 2025	
17	FW	(Portugal) Diana Silva	(Portugal) Sporting	4 July 2025	
22	DF	(Portugal) Diana Gomes	(Spain) Sevilla	16 July 2025	
2	MF	(France) Salomé Prat	(Portugal) Torreense	28 August 2025	
10	FW	(Denmark) Caroline Møller	(Spain) Real Madrid	1 September 2025	
56	MF	(United States) Carissa Boeckmann	(United States) Portland Thorns	6 September 2025	

=== Out ===
No.	Pos	Player	To Club	Date	Source
Summer transfers
80	DF	(Brazil) Laís Araújo	Free Agent	1 June 2025	
11	FW	(Jamaica) Jody Brown	(France) Marseille	21 July 2025	
99	FW	(Portugal) Beatriz Nogueira	(Switzerland) Rapperswil-Jona	23 July 2025	
36	MF	(Portugal) Mafalda Mariano	(Portugal) Vitória	23 July 2025	
10	FW	(Portugal) Andreia Faria	(Saudi Arabia) Al-Nassr	2 September 2025	

== Pre-season friendlies ==
Win Draw Loss

The pre-season began on 23 July 2025.

23 August 2025 V Trofeo Ciudad de Alcalá	(Spain) Atlético Madrid	2–2 (4–1 p)	Benfica	Madrid, Spain
11:00 CEST	Lauren 54'; Medina 86'	Report	Lund 14'; Gasper 75'	Stadium: Centro Deportivo Alcalá de Henares
	Penalties
	Menayo (penalty scored); García (penalty scored); Risa (penalty scored); Miñambres (penalty scored)		(penalty missed) Ucheibe; (penalty scored) Guedes; (penalty missed) Martín-Prieto

== Competitions ==
=== Overall record ===
Competition	First match	Last match	Starting round	Final position	Record							
Competition	First match	Last match	Starting round	Final position	Pld	W	D	L	GF	GA	GD	Win %
Campeonato Nacional Feminino	14 September 2025	10 May 2026	Matchday 1	TBD	6	5	1	0	24	2	+22	83.33
Taça de Portugal	TBD	TBD	Third round	TBD	0	0	0	0	0	0	+0	—
Taça da Liga	19 October 2025	TBD	Quarter-finals	TBD	1	1	0	0	5	1	+4	100.00
Supertaça	7 September 2025		Final	Final	1	0	0	1	1	2	−1	0.00
UEFA Champions League	7 October 2025	TBD	League Phase	TBD	2	0	0	2	1	4	−3	0.00
Total					10	6	1	3	31	9	+22	60.00

Last updated: 22 October 2025

=== Campeonato Nacional Feminino ===
==== League table ====
Pos	Team	Pld	W	D	L	GF	GA	GD	Pts	Qualification or relegation
1	Benfica	18	15	3	0	58	11	+47	48	Qualification for the Champions League league phase
2	Sporting CP	18	10	5	3	35	16	+19	35	Qualification for the Champions League second qualifying round
3	Torreense	18	10	2	6	29	22	+7	32	Qualification for the Champions League second qualifying round
4	Valadares Gaia	18	7	5	6	21	22	−1	26	
5	Braga	18	6	6	6	26	21	+5	24	
6	Vitória de Guimarães	18	4	9	5	16	23	−7	21	
7	Racing Power	18	4	6	8	16	23	−7	18	
8	Rio Ave	18	4	5	9	10	18	−8	17	Qualification for the relegation playoffs
9	Marítimo	18	4	2	12	19	40	−21	14	Qualification for the relegation playoffs
10	Damaiense (R)	18	2	5	11	17	51	−34	11	Relegation to the II Divisão

Source: Portuguese Football Federation (in Portuguese)
Rules for classification: 1) Points; 2) Goal difference; 3) Number of goals scored;
(R) Relegated

==== Results summary ====
Overall								Home						Away					
Pld	W	D	L	GF	GA	GD	Pts	W	D	L	GF	GA	GD	W	D	L	GF	GA	GD
6	5	1	0	24	2	+22	16	2	1	0	13	0	+13	3	0	0	11	2	+9

==== Results by round ====
Round	1	2	3	4	5	6	7	8	9	10	11	12	13	14	15	16	17	18
Ground	H	A	H	A	H	A	H	A	H	A	H	A	H	A	H	A	H	A
Result	D	W	W	W	W	W												
Position	4	1	1	1	1	1												
Points	1	4	7	10	13	16												

A = Away; H = Home; W = Win; D = Draw; L = Loss
Notes:
- Positions show the situation at the end of the corresponding Game Weeks (GW), not the position at the conclusion of matches or game days.

==== Matches ====
14 September 2025 1	Benfica	0-0	Racing Power	Seixal
11:00 WEST	Cameirão (yellow card) 15'; Tristão (yellow card) 78'; Lund (yellow card) 81'	Report		Stadium: Benfica Campus; Referee: Leonor Paiva

21 September 2025 2	Vitória	1-5	Benfica	Guimarães
17:00 WEST	Kaminska 15'	Report	Costa (yellow card) 13' (goal) 28'; Engesvik 46'; Møller 55'; Cameirão 57'; Davidson 70'; Guedes (yellow card) 79'	Stadium: Campo Nº5 Complexo Desportivo Dr. António Pimenta Machado Costa; Referee: Patricia Carneiro

27 September 2025 3	Benfica	8-0	Damaiense	Seixal
17:00 WEST	Martín-Prieto 5' 47'; Davidson 14'; Costa 39' (pen.) 67'; Harris 40' (o.g.); Almeida (yellow card) 57'; Silva 65' 68'	Report	Cruz (red card) 37'; Lockwood (yellow card) 84'	Stadium: Caixa Futebol Campus; Referee: Catia Duarte

12 October 2025 4	Valadares Gaia	1-4	Benfica	Vila Nova de Gaia
11:00 WEST	Monteiro (yellow card) 22'; Parkinson 45+16'; Meninas (yellow card) 90'	Report	Raysla 4'; Gasper 25' (pen.); Gomes (yellow card) 45+12'; Costa 51' (pen.) 90+4' (pen.); Cameirão (yellow card) 56'; Martín-Prieto (yellow card) 79'; Ucheibe (yellow card) 86'	Stadium: Estádio Municipal Jorge Sampaio; Referee: Raquel Correia

2 November 2025 5	Benfica	5-0	Marítimo	Seixal
17:00 WET	Møller 32' 49'; Raysla 62'; Costa 84' 90' (pen.)	Report	Ferreira (yellow card) 17' (yellow-red card) 36'	Stadium: Caixa Futebol Campus; Referee: Lorena Esteves

8 November 2025 6	Torreense	0-2	Benfica	Torres Vedras
11:00 WET	Rossman (yellow card) 28'; Rufino (yellow card) 66'	Report	Lund (yellow card) 22'; Gasper 67' (pen.); Davidson 81'	Stadium: Estádio Manuel Marques; Referee: Maria Ines Andrada

7 December 2025 7	Benfica	v	Braga	Seixal
15:00 WET				Stadium: Caixa Futebol Campus

21 December 2025 8	Sporting	v	Benfica	Alcochete
15:00 WET				Stadium: CGD Stadium Aurelio Pereira

11 January 2026 9	Benfica	v	Rio Ave	Seixal
15:00 WET				Stadium: Caixa Futebol Campus

25 January 2026 10	Racing Power	v	Benfica	Oeiras
15:00 WET				Stadium: Estádio Nacional

8 February 2026 11	Benfica	v	Vitória	Seixal
15:00 WET				Stadium: Caixa Futebol Campus

22 February 2026 12	Damaiense	v	Benfica	Lisbon
15:00 WET				Stadium: Campo Engenheiro Carlos Salema

15 March 2026 13	Benfica	v	Valadares Gaia	Seixal
15:00 WET				Stadium: Caixa Futebol Campus

22 March 2026 14	Marítimo	v	Benfica	Funchal
15:00 WET				Stadium: Campo da Imaculada Conceição

5 April 2026 15	Benfica	v	Torreense	Seixal
15:00 WEST				Stadium: Caixa Futebol Campus

26 April 2026 16	Braga	v	Benfica	Braga
15:00 WEST				Stadium: Estádio 1º de Maio

3 May 2026 17	Benfica	v	Sporting	Seixal
15:00 WEST				Stadium: Caixa Futebol Campus

10 May 2026 18	Rio Ave	v	Benfica	Vila do Conde
15:00 WET				Stadium: Estádio dos Arcos

=== Taça da Liga ===
19 October 2025 Group Stage	Marítimo	1–5	Benfica	Funchal
11:00 WEST	Sissé 40'; Holtz (yellow card) 42'	Report	Silva 30'; Boeckmann 46'; Zidoi 70' (o.g.) 79' (o.g.); Martins 87'	Stadium: Campo da Imaculada Conceição; Referee: Ana Afonso

4 January 2025 Group Stage	Benfica	v	Vitória	Seixal
15:00 WET				Stadium: Benfica Campus

14 January 2025 Group Stage	Braga	v	Benfica	Braga
15:00 WET				Stadium: Estadio Amelia Morais

31 January 2025 Group Stage	Benfica	v	Valadares Gaia	Seixal
15:00 WET				Stadium: Benfica Campus

=== Supertaça Feminina Vodafone ===
7 September 2025 Final	Benfica	1–2	Torreense	Alcabideche
17:15 WEST	Silva 1'; Lund (yellow card) 76'; Møller (yellow card) 90+8'	Report	Lemos (yellow card) 9'; Konst 11' (yellow card) 90+8'; Rossman 36'	Stadium: Estádio António Coimbra da Mota

=== UEFA Women's Champions League ===
==== League Phase ====
===== League table =====
Pos	Team	Pld	W	D	L	GF	GA	GD	Pts
14	(Italy) Roma	6	1	1	4	9	19	−10	4
15	(Netherlands) Twente	6	0	3	3	4	10	−6	3
16	(Portugal) Benfica	6	0	2	4	4	11	−7	2
17	(France) Paris Saint-Germain	6	0	2	4	4	12	−8	2
18	(Austria) St. Pölten	6	0	1	5	3	28	−25	1

Source: UEFA
Rules for classification: League phase tiebreakers

===== Results by round =====
Round	1	2	3	4	5	6
Ground	A	H	H	A	A	H
Result	L	L				
Position	16	15				
Points	0	0				

Source: UEFA
A = Away; H = Home; W = Win; D = Draw; L = Loss

===== Matches =====
7 October 2025 1	Juventus (Italy)	2-1	(Portugal) Benfica	Turin
18:45 CEST	Salvai 22' 86'	Report	Alves 6' (yellow card) 57'; Lund (yellow card) 49'; Møller (yellow card) 74'; Amado (yellow card) 83'; Gomes (yellow card) 90+1'	Stadium: Juventus Stadium; Attendance: 4,497; Referee: Ivana Martinčić (Croatia)

16 October 2025 2	Benfica (Portugal)	0-2	(England) Arsenal	Lisbon
21:00 WEST	Cameirão (yellow card) 62'; Alves (yellow card) 66'	Report	Mead 57'; Smith (yellow card) 66'; Caldentey (yellow card) 87'; Russo 89'	Stadium: Estádio da Luz; Attendance: 7,218; Referee: Miriama Bočková (Slovakia)

12 November 2025 3	Benfica (Portugal)	v	(Netherlands) Twente	Seixal
21:00 WET		Report

19 November 2025 4	Paris FC (France)	v	(Portugal) Benfica	Paris
21:00 CET		Report		Stadium: Stade Jean-Bouin

19 November 2025 5	Barcelona (Spain)	v	(Portugal) Benfica	Barcelona
18:45 CET		Report		Stadium: Johan Cruyff Stadium

17 November 2025 6	Benfica (Portugal)	v	(France) Paris Saint-Germain	Seixal
21:00 WET		Report

== Statistics ==
=== Appearances and goals ===
As of 5 November 2025

No.	Pos	Nat	Player	Total		Campeonato Nacional		Taça de Portugal		Taça da Liga		Supertaça Feminina Vodafone		Champions League	
No.	Pos	Nat	Player	Apps	Goals	Apps	Goals	Apps	Goals	Apps	Goals	Apps	Goals	Apps	Goals
Goalkeepers
1	GK	(Germany) GER	Lena Pauels	8	0	6	0	0	0	0	0	0	0	2	0
12	GK	(Portugal) POR	Thaís Lima	0	0	0	0	0	0	0	0	0	0	0	0
66	GK	(Portugal) POR	Rute Costa	1	0	0	0	0	0	1	0	0	0	0	0
Defenders
2	DF	(France) FRA	Salomé Prat	1	0	0	0	0	0	0+1	0	0	0	0	0
3	DF	(Portugal) POR	Joana Silva	1	0	0	0	0	0	1	0	0	0	0	0
5	DF	(Norway) NOR	Marit Lund	8	0	6	0	0	0	0	0	0	0	2	0
11	DF	(Portugal) POR	Ana Borges	0	0	0	0	0	0	0	0	0	0	0	0
15	DF	(Portugal) POR	Carole Costa	7	7	4+1	7	0	0	1	0	0	0	1	0
16	DF	(Nigeria) NGA	Christy Ucheibe	5	0	3	0	0	0	0	0	0	0	1+1	0
19	DF	(Portugal) POR	Catarina Amado	8	0	6	0	0	0	0	0	0	0	2	0
22	DF	(Portugal) POR	Diana Gomes	7	0	5	0	0	0	0	0	0	0	2	0
79	DF	(Portugal) POR	Marta Salvador	0	0	0	0	0	0	0	0	0	0	0	0
Midfielders
6	MF	(Portugal) POR	Beatriz Cameirão	7	1	5	1	0	0	0	0	0	0	2	0
8	MF	(Portugal) POR	Andreia Norton	0	0	0	0	0	0	0	0	0	0	0	0
10	MF	(Denmark) DEN	Caroline Møller	9	3	5+1	3	0	0	0+1	0	0	0	2	0
14	MF	(Portugal) POR	Letícia Almeida	5	0	2+1	0	0	0	1	0	0	0	0+1	0
18	MF	(Norway) NOR	Rakel Engesvik	5	1	1+3	1	0	0	0+1	0	0	0	0	0
21	MF	(Spain) ESP	Pauleta	4	0	0+3	0	0	0	0+1	0	0	0	0	0
23	MF	(Germany) GER	Anna Gasper	8	2	5+1	2	0	0	0	0	0	0	2	0
31	MF	(Brazil) BRA	Ana Oliveira	0	0	0	0	0	0	0	0	0	0	0	0
55	MF	(Portugal) POR	Carolina Tristão	7	0	0+4	0	0	0	1	0	0	0	1+1	0
56	MF	(United States) USA	Carissa Boeckmann	6	1	0+3	0	0	0	1	1	0	0	0+2	0
Forwards
7	FW	(Spain) ESP	Cristina Martín-Prieto	8	2	3+2	2	0	0	1	0	0	0	0+2	0
11	FW	(Brazil) BRA	Nycole Raysla	5	2	3+1	2	0	0	0	0	0	0	1	0
13	FW	(Portugal) POR	Lúcia Alves	7	1	4	0	0	0	0+1	0	0	0	2	1
17	FW	(Portugal) POR	Diana Silva	7	3	2+2	2	0	0	1	1	0	0	1+1	0
20	FW	(Portugal) POR	Lara Martins	7	1	0+5	0	0	0	1	1	0	0	0+1	0
25	FW	(Canada) CAN	Chandra Davidson	9	3	2+4	3	0	0	1	0	0	0	1+1	0
28	FW	(Spain) ESP	Andrea Falcón	0	0	0	0	0	0	0	0	0	0	0	0
77	FW	(Portugal) POR	Neide Guedes	4	0	1+2	0	0	0	1	0	0	0	0	0
Players who made an appearance and/or had a squad number but left the team.
