= 2025–26 in Italian football =

Football in Italy
- Season: 2025–26

Men's football
- Serie A: Internazionale
- Serie B: Venezia
- Serie C: Vicenza (Group A); Arezzo (Group B); Benevento (Group C)
- Coppa Italia: Internazionale
- Supercoppa Italiana: Napoli

Women's football
- Serie A: Roma
- Serie A Women's Cup: Juventus
- Supercoppa Italiana: Juventus

The 2025–26 season was the 124th season of competitive football in Italy.

== National teams ==
=== Men ===
==== Italy national football team ====
===== 2026 FIFA World Cup qualification =====
====== Group I ======
Pos	Team	Pld	W	D	L	GF	GA	GD	Pts	Qualification	(Norway national football team)	(Italy national football team)	(Israel national football team)	(Estonia national football team)	(Moldova national football team)
1	Norway	8	8	0	0	37	5	+32	24	Qualification for 2026 FIFA World Cup	—	3–0	5–0	4–1	11–1
2	Italy	8	6	0	2	21	12	+9	18	Advance to play-offs	1–4	—	3–0	5–0	2–0
3	Israel	8	4	0	4	19	20	−1	12		2–4	4–5	—	2–1	4–1
4	Estonia	8	1	1	6	8	21	−13	4		0–1	1–3	1–3	—	1–1
5	Moldova	8	0	1	7	5	32	−27	1		0–5	0–2	0–4	2–3	—

Source: FIFA, UEFA

====== Second round Path A ======
The winners of each path will qualify for the World Cup.

Semi-finals
26 March 2026 – Cardiff
Wales	1 (2)
Bosnia and Herzegovina (p)	1 (4)
26 March 2026 – Bergamo
Italy	2
Northern Ireland	0

Final
31 March 2026 – Zenica
Bosnia and Herzegovina (p)	1 (4)
Italy	1 (1)

26 March 2026	Italy	2–0	Northern Ireland	Bergamo, Italy
	Tonali 56'; Kean 80'	Report		Stadium: Stadio Atleti Azzurri d'Italia; Attendance: 23,439; Referee: Danny Makkelie (Netherlands)

31 March 2026	Bosnia and Herzegovina	1–1 (a.e.t.) (4–1 p)	Italy	Zenica, Bosnia and Herzegovina
20:45	Tabaković 79'	Report	Kean 15'	Stadium: Stadion Bilino Polje; Attendance: 9,500; Referee: Clément Turpin (France)
	Penalties
	Tahirović (penalty scored); Tabaković (penalty scored); Alajbegović (penalty scored); Bajraktarević (penalty scored)		(penalty missed) Esposito; (penalty scored) Tonali; (penalty missed) Cristante

==== U-20 ====
===== 2025 FIFA U-20 World Cup =====
====== Group D ======
Pos	Team	Pld	W	D	L	GF	GA	GD	Pts	Qualification
1	Argentina	3	3	0	0	8	2	+6	9	Knockout stage
2	Italy	3	1	1	1	3	3	0	4	Knockout stage
3	Australia	3	1	0	2	4	6	−2	3	
4	Cuba	3	0	1	2	4	8	−4	1	

Source: FIFA
Rules for classification: Group stage tiebreakers

====== Knockout stage ======
October 9 R16	United States	3–0	Italy	Rancagua, Chile
16:30	Cremaschi 15', 90+3'; Tsakiris 79'	Report		Stadium: Estadio El Teniente; Attendance: 6,598; Referee: Gustavo Tejera (Uruguay)

=== Women ===
==== Italy women's national football team ====
===== UEFA Women's Euro 2025 =====
====== UEFA Women's Euro 2025 Group B ======
Pos	Team	Pld	W	D	L	GF	GA	GD	Pts	Qualification
1	Spain	3	3	0	0	14	3	+11	9	Advance to knockout stage
2	Italy	3	1	1	1	3	4	−1	4	Advance to knockout stage
3	Belgium	3	1	0	2	4	8	−4	3	
4	Portugal	3	0	1	2	2	8	−6	1	

Source: UEFA
Rules for classification: Group stage tiebreakers

====== Knockout Stage ======
16 July 2025 QF	Norway	1–2	Italy	Stade de Genève, Geneva
21:00	Hegerberg 66'	Report	Girelli 50', 90'	Attendance: 26,276; Referee: Stéphanie Frappart (France)

22 July 2025 SF	England	2–1 (a.e.t.)	Italy	Stade de Genève, Geneva
21:00	Agyemang 90+6'; Kelly 119'	Report	Bonansea 33'	Attendance: 26,539; Referee: Ivana Martinčić (Croatia)

===== 2027 FIFA Women's World Cup qualification =====
====== 2027 FIFA Women's World Cup qualification – UEFA League A Group A1 ======
Pos	Team	Pld	W	D	L	GF	GA	GD	Pts	Qualification or relegation
1	Denmark	6	4	2	0	12	5	+7	14	Qualification to 2027 FIFA Women's World Cup
2	Italy	6	2	3	1	12	4	+8	9	Advance to play-offs
3	Sweden	6	2	2	2	6	6	0	8	Advance to play-offs
4	Serbia (R)	6	0	1	5	2	17	−15	1	Advance to play-offs and relegation to League B

Source: UEFA
Rules for classification: Tiebreakers
(R) Relegated

==== U–17 ====
===== FIFA U-17 Women's World Cup =====
====== Group A ======
Pos	Team	Pld	W	D	L	GF	GA	GD	Pts	Qualification
1	Italy	3	3	0	0	10	4	+6	9	Knockout stage
2	Brazil	3	1	1	1	7	5	+2	4	Knockout stage
3	Morocco (H)	3	1	0	2	4	7	−3	3	Knockout stage
4	Costa Rica	3	0	1	2	2	7	−5	1	

Source: FIFA
Rules for classification: Group stage tiebreakers
(H) Hosts

=== Round of 16 ===
28 October 2025
20:00

Italy	4–0	Nigeria
Copelli 45'; Venturelli 58'; Robino 63'; Giudici 89'	Report

Mohammed VI Football Academy (pitch 2), Salé
Attendance: 1,037
Referee: Verónica Guazhambo (Ecuador)

=== Quarter-finals ===
2 November 2025
20:00

Mexico	0–0	Italy
	Report
Penalties
Reyes (penalty scored); Ibarra (penalty scored); Villalpando (penalty scored); Alvarado (penalty scored); Ávila (penalty scored)	5–4	(penalty scored) Bedini; (penalty scored) Galli; (penalty missed) Giudici; (penalty scored) Robino; (penalty scored) Bressan

Rabat Olympic Stadium, Rabat
Attendance: 203
Referee: Lara Lee (Australia)

== UEFA competitions ==
=== UEFA Champions League ===
==== League phase ====
===== Atalanta =====
Pos	Team	Pld	W	D	L	GF	GA	GD	Pts	Qualification
13	(Italian Football Federation) Juventus	8	3	4	1	14	10	+4	13	Advance to knockout phase play-offs (seeded)
14	(Royal Spanish Football Federation) Atlético Madrid	8	4	1	3	17	15	+2	13	Advance to knockout phase play-offs (seeded)
15	(Italian Football Federation) Atalanta	8	4	1	3	10	10	0	13	Advance to knockout phase play-offs (seeded)
16	(German Football Association) Bayer Leverkusen	8	3	3	2	13	14	−1	12	Advance to knockout phase play-offs (seeded)
17	(German Football Association) Borussia Dortmund	8	3	2	3	19	17	+2	11	Advance to knockout phase play-offs (unseeded)

Source: UEFA
Rules for classification: League phase tiebreakers

Home team	Score	Away team
Paris Saint-Germain (France)	4–0	(Italy) Atalanta
Atalanta (Italy)	2–1	(Belgium) Club Brugge
Atalanta (Italy)	0–0	(Czech Republic) Slavia Prague
Marseille (France)	0–1	(Italy) Atalanta
Eintracht Frankfurt (Germany)	0–3	(Italy) Atalanta
Atalanta (Italy)	2–1	(England) Chelsea
Atalanta (Italy)	2–3	(Spain) Athletic Bilbao
Union Saint-Gilloise (Belgium)	1–0	(Italy) Atalanta

===== Inter Milan =====
Pos	Team	Pld	W	D	L	GF	GA	GD	Pts	Qualification
8	(The Football Association) Manchester City	8	5	1	2	15	9	+6	16	Advance to round of 16 (seeded)
9	(Royal Spanish Football Federation) Real Madrid	8	5	0	3	21	12	+9	15	Advance to knockout phase play-offs (seeded)
10	(Italian Football Federation) Inter Milan	8	5	0	3	15	7	+8	15	Advance to knockout phase play-offs (seeded)
11	(French Football Federation) Paris Saint-Germain	8	4	2	2	21	11	+10	14	Advance to knockout phase play-offs (seeded)
12	(The Football Association) Newcastle United	8	4	2	2	17	7	+10	14	Advance to knockout phase play-offs (seeded)

Source: UEFA
Rules for classification: League phase tiebreakers

Home team	Score	Away team
Ajax (Netherlands)	0–2	(Italy) Inter Milan
Inter Milan (Italy)	3–0	(Czech Republic) Slavia Prague
Union Saint-Gilloise (Belgium)	0–4	(Italy) Inter Milan
Inter Milan (Italy)	2–1	(Kazakhstan) Kairat
Atlético Madrid (Spain)	2–1	(Italy) Inter Milan
Inter Milan (Italy)	0–1	(England) Liverpool
Inter Milan (Italy)	1–3	(England) Arsenal
Borussia Dortmund (Germany)	0–2	(Italy) Inter Milan

===== Juventus =====
Pos	Team	Pld	W	D	L	GF	GA	GD	Pts	Qualification
11	(French Football Federation) Paris Saint-Germain	8	4	2	2	21	11	+10	14	Advance to knockout phase play-offs (seeded)
12	(The Football Association) Newcastle United	8	4	2	2	17	7	+10	14	Advance to knockout phase play-offs (seeded)
13	(Italian Football Federation) Juventus	8	3	4	1	14	10	+4	13	Advance to knockout phase play-offs (seeded)
14	(Royal Spanish Football Federation) Atlético Madrid	8	4	1	3	17	15	+2	13	Advance to knockout phase play-offs (seeded)
15	(Italian Football Federation) Atalanta	8	4	1	3	10	10	0	13	Advance to knockout phase play-offs (seeded)

Source: UEFA
Rules for classification: League phase tiebreakers

Home team	Score	Away team
Juventus (Italy)	4–4	(Germany) Borussia Dortmund
Villarreal (Spain)	2–2	(Italy) Juventus
Real Madrid (Spain)	1–0	(Italy) Juventus
Juventus (Italy)	1–1	(Portugal) Sporting CP
Bodø/Glimt (Norway)	2–3	(Italy) Juventus
Juventus (Italy)	2–0	(Cyprus) Pafos
Juventus (Italy)	2–0	(Portugal) Benfica
Monaco (France)	0–0	(Italy) Juventus

===== Napoli =====
Pos	Team	Pld	W	D	L	GF	GA	GD	Pts
28	(Royal Dutch Football Association) PSV Eindhoven	8	2	2	4	16	16	0	8
29	(Royal Spanish Football Federation) Athletic Bilbao	8	2	2	4	9	14	−5	8
30	(Italian Football Federation) Napoli	8	2	2	4	9	15	−6	8
31	(Danish Football Association) Copenhagen	8	2	2	4	12	21	−9	8
32	(Royal Dutch Football Association) Ajax	8	2	0	6	8	21	−13	6

Source: UEFA
Rules for classification: League phase tiebreakers

Home team	Score	Away team
Manchester City (England)	2–0	(Italy) Napoli
Napoli (Italy)	2–1	(Portugal) Sporting CP
PSV Eindhoven (Netherlands)	6–2	(Italy) Napoli
Napoli (Italy)	0–0	(Germany) Eintracht Frankfurt
Napoli (Italy)	2–0	(Azerbaijan) Qarabağ
Benfica (Portugal)	2–0	(Italy) Napoli
Copenhagen (Denmark)	1–1	(Italy) Napoli
Napoli (Italy)	2–3	(England) Chelsea

==== Knockout phase ====
===== Knockout phase play-offs =====
Team 1	Agg.	Team 2	1st leg	2nd leg
Galatasaray (Turkey)	7–5	(Italy) Juventus	5–2	2–3 (a.e.t.)
Borussia Dortmund (Germany)	3–4	(Italy) Atalanta	2–0	1–4
Bodø/Glimt (Norway)	5–2	(Italy) Inter Milan	3–1	2–1

===== Round of 16 =====
Team 1	Agg.	Team 2	1st leg	2nd leg
Atalanta (Italy)	2–10	(Germany) Bayern Munich	1–6	1–4

=== UEFA Europa League ===
==== League phase ====
===== Bologna =====
Pos	Team	Pld	W	D	L	GF	GA	GD	Pts	Qualification
8	(Italian Football Federation) Roma	8	5	1	2	13	6	+7	16	Advance to round of 16 (seeded)
9	(Royal Belgian Football Association) Genk	8	5	1	2	11	7	+4	16	Advance to knockout phase play-offs (seeded)
10	(Italian Football Federation) Bologna	8	4	3	1	14	7	+7	15	Advance to knockout phase play-offs (seeded)
11	(German Football Association) VfB Stuttgart	8	5	0	3	15	9	+6	15	Advance to knockout phase play-offs (seeded)
12	(Hungarian Football Federation) Ferencváros	8	4	3	1	12	11	+1	15	Advance to knockout phase play-offs (seeded)

Source: UEFA
Rules for classification: League phase tiebreakers

Home team	Score	Away team
Aston Villa (England)	1–0	(Italy) Bologna
Bologna (Italy)	1–1	(Germany) SC Freiburg
FCSB (Romania)	1–2	(Italy) Bologna
Bologna (Italy)	0–0	(Norway) Brann
Bologna (Italy)	4–1	(Austria) Red Bull Salzburg
Celta Vigo (Spain)	1–2	(Italy) Bologna
Bologna (Italy)	2–2	(Scotland) Celtic
Maccabi Tel Aviv (Israel)	0–3	(Italy) Bologna

===== Roma =====
Pos	Team	Pld	W	D	L	GF	GA	GD	Pts	Qualification
6	(Portuguese Football Federation) Braga	8	5	2	1	11	5	+6	17	Advance to round of 16 (seeded)
7	(German Football Association) SC Freiburg	8	5	2	1	10	4	+6	17	Advance to round of 16 (seeded)
8	(Italian Football Federation) Roma	8	5	1	2	13	6	+7	16	Advance to round of 16 (seeded)
9	(Royal Belgian Football Association) Genk	8	5	1	2	11	7	+4	16	Advance to knockout phase play-offs (seeded)
10	(Italian Football Federation) Bologna	8	4	3	1	14	7	+7	15	Advance to knockout phase play-offs (seeded)

Source: UEFA
Rules for classification: League phase tiebreakers

Home team	Score	Away team
Nice (France)	1–2	(Italy) Roma
Roma (Italy)	0–1	(France) Lille
Roma (Italy)	1–2	(Czech Republic) Viktoria Plzeň
Rangers (Scotland)	0–2	(Italy) Roma
Roma (Italy)	2–1	(Denmark) Midtjylland
Celtic (Scotland)	0–3	(Italy) Roma
Roma (Italy)	2–0	(Germany) VfB Stuttgart
Panathinaikos (Greece)	1–1	(Italy) Roma

==== Knockout phase ====
===== Knockout phase play-offs =====
Team 1	Agg.	Team 2	1st leg	2nd leg
Brann (Norway)	0–2	(Italy) Bologna	0–1	0–1

===== Round of 16 =====
Team 1	Agg.	Team 2	1st leg	2nd leg
Bologna (Italy)	5–4	(Italy) Roma	1–1	4–3 (a.e.t.)

===== Quarter-finals =====
Team 1	Agg.	Team 2	1st leg	2nd leg
Bologna (Italy)	1–7	(England) Aston Villa	1–3	0–4

=== UEFA Conference League ===
==== Qualifying round ====
===== Play-off round =====
Play-off round
Team 1	Agg.	Team 2	1st leg	2nd leg
Polissya Zhytomyr (Ukraine)	2–6	(Italy) Fiorentina	0–3	2–3

==== League phase ====
===== Fiorentina =====
Pos	Team	Pld	W	D	L	GF	GA	GD	Pts	Qualification
13	(Football Association of Slovenia) Celje	6	3	1	2	8	7	+1	10	Advance to knockout phase play-offs (seeded)
14	(Royal Dutch Football Association) AZ	6	3	1	2	7	7	0	10	Advance to knockout phase play-offs (seeded)
15	(Italian Football Federation) Fiorentina	6	3	0	3	8	5	+3	9	Advance to knockout phase play-offs (seeded)
16	(Croatian Football Federation) Rijeka	6	2	3	1	5	2	+3	9	Advance to knockout phase play-offs (seeded)
17	(Polish Football Association) Jagiellonia Białystok	6	2	3	1	5	4	+1	9	Advance to knockout phase play-offs (unseeded)

Source: UEFA
Rules for classification: League phase tiebreakers

Home team	Score	Away team
Fiorentina (Italy)	2–0	(Czech Republic) Sigma Olomouc
Rapid Wien (Austria)	0–3	(Italy) Fiorentina
Mainz 05 (Germany)	2–1	(Italy) Fiorentina
Fiorentina (Italy)	0–1	(Greece) AEK Athens
Fiorentina (Italy)	2–1	(Ukraine) Dynamo Kyiv
Lausanne-Sport (Switzerland)	1–0	(Italy) Fiorentina

==== Knockout phase ====
===== Knockout phase play-offs =====
Team 1	Agg.	Team 2	1st leg	2nd leg
Jagiellonia Białystok (Poland)	4–5	(Italy) Fiorentina	0–3	4–2 (a.e.t.)

===== Round of 16 =====
Team 1	Agg.	Team 2	1st leg	2nd leg
Fiorentina (Italy)	4–2	(Poland) Raków Częstochowa	2–1	2–1

===== Quarter-finals =====
Team 1	Agg.	Team 2	1st leg	2nd leg
Crystal Palace (England)	4–2	(Italy) Fiorentina	3–0	1–2

=== UEFA Women's Champions League ===
==== Qualifying rounds ====
===== Second qualifying round =====
====== Semi-finals ======
Semi-finals
Team 1	Score	Team 2
Roma (Italy)	2–0	(Kazakhstan) Aktobe
Brann (Norway)	2–1	(Italy) Inter Milan

====== Third place ======
Third place
Team 1	Score	Team 2
Valur (Iceland)	1–4	(Italy) Inter Milan

====== Final ======
Final
Team 1	Score	Team 2
Roma (Italy)	5–1	(Czech Republic) Sparta Prague

===== Third qualifying round =====
Third qualifying round
Team 1	Agg.	Team 2	1st leg	2nd leg
Roma (Italy)	3–2	(Portugal) Sporting CP	1–2	2–0

==== League stage ====
===== Juventus =====
Pos	Team	Pld	W	D	L	GF	GA	GD	Pts	Qualification
6	(The Football Association) Manchester United	6	4	0	2	7	9	−2	12	Advance to the knockout phase play-offs (seeded)
7	(Royal Spanish Football Federation) Real Madrid	6	3	2	1	13	7	+6	11	Advance to the knockout phase play-offs (seeded)
8	(Italian Football Federation) Juventus	6	3	1	2	13	8	+5	10	Advance to the knockout phase play-offs (seeded)
9	(German Football Association) VfL Wolfsburg	6	3	0	3	13	10	+3	9	Advance to the knockout phase play-offs (unseeded)
10	(French Football Federation) Paris FC	6	2	2	2	6	9	−3	8	Advance to the knockout phase play-offs (unseeded)

Source: UEFA
Rules for classification: League phase tiebreakers

Home team	Score	Away team
Juventus (Italy)	2–1	(Portugal) Benfica
Bayern Munich (Germany)	2–1	(Italy) Juventus
Atlético Madrid (Spain)	1–2	(Italy) Juventus
Juventus (Italy)	3–3	(France) Lyon
St. Pölten (Austria)	0–5	(Italy) Juventus
Juventus (Italy)	0–1	(England) Manchester United

===== Roma =====
Pos	Team	Pld	W	D	L	GF	GA	GD	Pts	Qualification
12	(Royal Belgian Football Association) OH Leuven	6	1	3	2	5	10	−5	6	Advance to the knockout phase play-offs (unseeded)
13	(Norwegian Football Federation) Vålerenga	6	1	1	4	4	9	−5	4	
14	(Italian Football Federation) Roma	6	1	1	4	9	19	−10	4	
15	(Royal Dutch Football Association) Twente	6	0	3	3	4	10	−6	3	
16	(Portuguese Football Federation) Benfica	6	0	2	4	4	11	−7	2	

Source: UEFA
Rules for classification: League phase tiebreakers

Home team	Score	Away team
Real Madrid (Spain)	6–2	(Italy) Roma
Roma (Italy)	0–4	(Spain) Barcelona
Roma (Italy)	0–1	(Norway) Vålerenga
OH Leuven (Belgium)	1–1	(Italy) Roma
Chelsea (England)	6–0	(Italy) Roma
Roma (Italy)	6–1	(Austria) St. Pölten

==== Knockout phase ====
===== Knockout phase play-offs =====
Team 1	Agg.	Team 2	1st leg	2nd leg
VfL Wolfsburg (Germany)	4–2	(Italy) Juventus	2–2	2–0

=== UEFA Women's Europa Cup ===
==== Qualifying rounds ====
===== First qualifying round =====
First qualifying Round
Team 1	Agg.	Team 2	1st leg	2nd leg
Inter Milan (Italy)	5–1	(Scotland) Hibernian	4–1	1–0

===== Second qualifying round =====
Second qualifying round
Team 1	Agg.	Team 2	1st leg	2nd leg
Inter Milan (Italy)	12–0	(Albania) Vllaznia	7–0	5–0

==== Knockout stage ====
===== Round of 16 =====
Round of 16
Team 1	Agg.	Team 2	1st leg	2nd leg
BK Häcken (Sweden)	1–0	(Italy) Inter Milan	1–0	0–0

=== UEFA Youth League ===
==== UEFA Champions League Path ====
===== Atalanta =====
Pos	Team	Pld	W	D	L	GF	GA	GD	Pts
27	(German Football Association) Bayern Munich	6	1	1	4	10	16	−6	4
28	(Kazakhstan Football Federation) Kairat	6	1	1	4	8	15	−7	4
29	(Italian Football Federation) Atalanta	6	1	1	4	6	13	−7	4
30	(Cyprus Football Association) Pafos	6	1	1	4	5	15	−10	4
31	(Royal Belgian Football Association) Union Saint-Gilloise	6	1	1	4	7	18	−11	4

Source: UEFA
Rules for classification: League phase tiebreakers

Home team	Score	Away team
Paris Saint-Germain (France)	5–1	(Italy) Atalanta
Atalanta (Italy)	0–2	(Belgium) Club Brugge
Atalanta (Italy)	2–0	(Czech Republic) Slavia Prague
Marseille (France)	0–0	(Italy) Atalanta
Eintracht Frankfurt (Germany)	3–2	(Italy) Atalanta
Atalanta (Italy)	1–3	(England) Chelsea

===== Inter Milan =====
Pos	Team	Pld	W	D	L	GF	GA	GD	Pts	Qualification
12	(Portuguese Football Federation) Sporting CP	6	3	3	0	13	10	+3	12	Advance to knockout phase
13	(French Football Federation) Paris Saint-Germain	6	3	2	1	17	8	+9	11	Advance to knockout phase
14	(Italian Football Federation) Inter Milan	6	3	2	1	14	8	+6	11	Advance to knockout phase
15	(Royal Dutch Football Association) Ajax	6	3	1	2	24	16	+8	10	Advance to knockout phase
16	(The Football Association) Liverpool	6	3	1	2	8	13	−5	10	Advance to knockout phase

Source: UEFA
Rules for classification: League phase tiebreakers

Home team	Score	Away team
Ajax (Netherlands)	1–1	(Italy) Inter Milan
Inter Milan (Italy)	2–2	(Czech Republic) Slavia Prague
Union Saint-Gilloise (Belgium)	1–2	(Italy) Inter Milan
Inter Milan (Italy)	3–0	(Kazakhstan) Kairat
Atlético Madrid (Spain)	4–1	(Italy) Inter Milan
Inter Milan (Italy)	5–0	(England) Liverpool

===== Juventus =====
Pos	Team	Pld	W	D	L	GF	GA	GD	Pts
24	(Hellenic Football Federation) Olympiacos	6	2	1	3	8	10	−2	7
25	(Italian Football Federation) Napoli	6	1	3	2	3	6	−3	6
26	(Italian Football Federation) Juventus	6	1	2	3	12	11	+1	5
27	(German Football Association) Bayern Munich	6	1	1	4	10	16	−6	4
28	(Kazakhstan Football Federation) Kairat	6	1	1	4	8	15	−7	4

Source: UEFA
Rules for classification: League phase tiebreakers

Home team	Score	Away team
Juventus (Italy)	2–3	(Germany) Borussia Dortmund
Villarreal (Spain)	1–0	(Italy) Juventus
Real Madrid (Spain)	1–0	(Italy) Juventus
Juventus (Italy)	2–2	(Portugal) Sporting CP
Bodø/Glimt (Norway)	2–6	(Italy) Juventus
Juventus (Italy)	2–2	(Cyprus) Pafos

===== Napoli =====
Pos	Team	Pld	W	D	L	GF	GA	GD	Pts
23	(Danish Football Association) Copenhagen	6	2	1	3	10	10	0	7
24	(Hellenic Football Federation) Olympiacos	6	2	1	3	8	10	−2	7
25	(Italian Football Federation) Napoli	6	1	3	2	3	6	−3	6
26	(Italian Football Federation) Juventus	6	1	2	3	12	11	+1	5
27	(German Football Association) Bayern Munich	6	1	1	4	10	16	−6	4

Source: UEFA
Rules for classification: League phase tiebreakers

Home team	Score	Away team
Manchester City (England)	2–0	(Italy) Napoli
Napoli (Italy)	1–1	(Portugal) Sporting CP
PSV Eindhoven (Netherlands)	0–0	(Italy) Napoli
Napoli (Italy)	0–0	(Germany) Eintracht Frankfurt
Napoli (Italy)	2–0	(Azerbaijan) Qarabağ
Benfica (Portugal)	3–0	(Italy) Napoli

==== Domestic Champions Path ====
===== Second round =====
Team 1	Agg.	Team 2	1st leg	2nd leg
Legia Warsaw (Poland)	6–4	(Italy) Fiorentina	4–1	2–3

==== Knockout phase ====
===== Round of 32 =====
Home team	Score	Away team
1. FC Köln (Germany)	1–3	(Italy) Inter Milan

===== Round of 16 =====
Home team	Score	Away team
Inter Milan (Italy)	5–3	(Spain) Real Betis

===== Quarter-finals =====
Home team	Score	Away team
Inter Milan (Italy)	2–3	(Portugal) Benfica

== League season ==
=== Men ===
==== Serie A ====
Pos	Team	Pld	W	D	L	GF	GA	GD	Pts	Qualification or relegation
1	Inter Milan (C)	38	27	6	5	89	35	+54	87	Qualification for the UEFA Champions League league phase
2	Napoli	38	23	7	8	58	36	+22	76	Qualification for the UEFA Champions League league phase
3	Roma	38	23	4	11	59	31	+28	73	Qualification for the UEFA Champions League league phase
4	Como	38	20	11	7	65	29	+36	71	Qualification for the UEFA Champions League league phase
5	AC Milan	38	20	10	8	53	35	+18	70	Qualification for the UEFA Europa League league phase (Note: Since the 2025–26 Coppa Italia winners, Inter Milan, qualified for the Champions League via league position, the Europa League spot awarded to the cup winners was passed to the sixth-placed team, and the Conference League spot was moved down one league position.)
6	Juventus	38	19	12	7	61	34	+27	69	Qualification for the UEFA Europa League league phase
7	Atalanta	38	15	14	9	51	36	+15	59	Qualification for the UEFA Conference League play-off round
8	Bologna	38	16	8	14	49	46	+3	56	
9	Lazio	38	14	12	12	41	40	+1	54	
10	Udinese	38	14	8	16	45	48	−3	50	
11	Sassuolo	38	14	7	17	46	50	−4	49	
12	Torino	38	12	9	17	44	63	−19	45 (Note: Torino finished ahead of Parma on head-to-head goal difference: Parma 2–1 Torino, Torino 4–1 Parma.)	
13	Parma	38	11	12	15	28	46	−18	45	
14	Cagliari	38	11	10	17	40	53	−13	43	
15	Fiorentina	38	9	15	14	41	50	−9	42	
16	Genoa	38	10	11	17	41	51	−10	41	
17	Lecce	38	10	8	20	28	50	−22	38	
18	Cremonese (R)	38	8	10	20	32	57	−25	34	Relegation to Serie B
19	Hellas Verona (R)	38	3	12	23	25	61	−36	21	Relegation to Serie B
20	Pisa (R)	38	2	12	24	26	71	−45	18	Relegation to Serie B

Source: Serie A
Rules for classification: 1) Points; 2) Tiebreaker for Champions team and third relegated team; 3) Head-to-head points; 4) Head-to-head goal difference; 5) Goal difference; 6) Goals scored; 7) Draw.
(Note: Head-to-head record is used only after all the matches between the teams in question have been played)
(C) Champions; (R) Relegated

==== Serie B ====
Pos	Team	Pld	W	D	L	GF	GA	GD	Pts	Promotion, qualification or relegation
1	Venezia (C, P)	38	24	10	4	77	31	+46	82	Promotion to Serie A
2	Frosinone (P)	38	23	12	3	76	34	+42	81	Promotion to Serie A
3	Monza (O, P)	38	22	10	6	61	32	+29	76	Qualification for promotion play-offs semi-finals
4	Palermo	38	20	12	6	61	33	+28	72	Qualification for promotion play-offs semi-finals
5	Catanzaro	38	15	14	9	62	51	+11	59	Qualification for promotion play-offs preliminary round
6	Modena	38	15	10	13	49	36	+13	55	Qualification for promotion play-offs preliminary round
7	Juve Stabia	38	11	18	9	44	45	−1	51	Qualification for promotion play-offs preliminary round
8	Avellino	38	13	10	15	43	55	−12	49	Qualification for promotion play-offs preliminary round
9	Mantova	38	13	7	18	45	57	−12	46 (Note: Head-to-head points: Mantova 9, Padova 4, Cesena 4. Head-to-head goal difference: Padova −1, Cesena −3.)	
10	Padova	38	12	10	16	39	49	−10	46	
11	Cesena	38	12	10	16	45	56	−11	46	
12	Carrarese	38	10	14	14	47	52	−5	44 (Note: Carrarese finished ahead of Sampdoria on head-to-head goal difference: Sampdoria 3–2 Carrarese, Carrarese 2–0 Sampdoria.)	
13	Sampdoria	38	11	11	16	35	48	−13	44	
14	Virtus Entella	38	10	12	16	36	51	−15	42	
15	Empoli	38	9	14	15	47	54	−7	41	
16	Südtirol (O)	38	8	17	13	38	48	−10	41	Qualification for relegation play-out
17	Bari (R)	38	10	10	18	38	60	−22	40	Qualification for relegation play-out
18	Reggiana (R)	38	9	10	19	36	56	−20	37	Relegation to Serie C
19	Spezia (R)	38	8	11	19	43	59	−16	35 (Note: Spezia finished ahead of Pescara on head-to-head points: Spezia 2–1 Pescara, Pescara 1–1 Spezia.)	Relegation to Serie C
20	Pescara (R)	38	7	14	17	51	66	−15	35	Relegation to Serie C

Source: Serie BKT
Rules for classification: 1) Points; 2) Head-to-head points; 3) Head-to-head goal difference; 4) Goal difference; 5) Goals scored; 6) Draw.
(Note: Head-to-head record is used only after all the matches between the teams in question have been played)
(C) Champions; (O) Play-off winners; (P) Promoted; (R) Relegated

==== Serie C ====
Group A (North)

Pos	Team	Pld	Pts
1	Vicenza (C, P)	38	89
2	Union Brescia	38	69
3	Renate	38	64
4	Lecco	38	64
5	Trento	38	63
6	Cittadella	38	59
7	Lumezzane	38	56
8	Alcione Milano	38	55
9	Arzignano	38	53
10	Giana Erminio	38	52
11	AlbinoLeffe	38	50
12	Inter Milan U23	38	48
13	Novara	38	47
14	Pro Vercelli	38	46
15	Ospitaletto	38	45
16	Pergolettese	38	41
17	Dolomiti Bellunesi	38	40
18	Virtus Verona (R)	38	25
19	Pro Patria (R)	38	23
20	Triestina (R)	38	13

Source: Lega Pro, Soccerway (in English)
(C) Champions;
(P) Promoted;
(R) Relegated
Group B (Centre)

Pos	Team	Pld	Pts
1	Arezzo (P)	36	80
2	Ascoli (O, P)	36	77
3	Ravenna	36	73
4	Campobasso	36	59
5	Juventus Next Gen	36	53
6	Pianese	36	50
7	Pineto	36	50
8	Gubbio	36	48
9	Ternana (E, R, R)	36	48
10	Vis Pesaro	36	46
11	Livorno	36	43
12	Forlì	36	40
13	Carpi	36	40
14	Perugia	36	38
15	Guidonia Montecelio	36	38
16	Sambenedettese	36	37
17	Torres (O)	36	36
18	Bra (R)	36	32
19	Pontedera (R)	36	20
20	Rimini (D, R, R)	0	0

Source: Lega Pro, Soccerway (in English)
(D) Disqualified;
(E) Eliminated;
(O) Play-off winners;
(P) Promoted;
(R) Relegated
Group C (South)

Pos	Team	Pld	Pts
1	Benevento (C, P)	38	82
2	Catania	38	70
3	Salernitana	38	69
4	Cosenza	38	67
5	Casertana	38	66
6	Crotone	38	61
7	Monopoli	38	56
8	Casarano	38	56
9	Audace Cerignola	38	54
10	Potenza	38	49
11	Atalanta U23	38	45
12	Team Altamura	38	45
13	Latina	38	42
14	Cavese	38	42
15	Picerno	38	40
16	Sorrento	38	39
17	Giugliano	38	37
18	Foggia (T)	38	27
19	Siracusa (R)	38	26
20	Trapani (R)	38	24

Source: Lega Pro, Soccerway (in English)
(C) Champions;
(P) Promoted;
(R) Relegated;
(T) Qualified, but not yet for the particular phase indicated

=== Women ===
==== Serie A (women) ====
Pos	Team	Pld	W	D	L	GF	GA	GD	Pts	Qualification
1	Roma (C)	22	17	4	1	44	19	+25	55	Qualification for the Champions League league phase
2	Inter Milan	22	13	5	4	49	26	+23	44	Qualification for the Champions League third qualifying round
3	Juventus	22	11	6	5	33	19	+14	39	Qualification for the Champions League second qualifying round
4	Fiorentina	22	10	6	6	33	30	+3	36	
5	Lazio	22	10	3	9	31	30	+1	33	
6	Milan	22	9	5	8	31	26	+5	32	
7	Napoli	22	8	8	6	30	25	+5	32	
8	Como	22	8	6	8	24	22	+2	30	
9	Sassuolo	22	4	6	12	17	34	−17	18	
10	Ternana	22	4	5	13	19	40	−21	17	
11	Parma	22	2	10	10	16	31	−15	16	
12	Genoa (R)	22	2	4	16	18	43	−25	10	Relegation to Serie B

Source: Soccerway
Rules for classification: 1) Points; 2) Tiebreaker for the Champions League team and the relegated team; 3) Head-to-head points; 4) Head-to-head goal difference; 5) Goal difference; 6) Goals scored; 7) Draw
(C) Champions; (R) Relegated

== Cup competitions ==
=== Men ===
==== Coppa Italia ====
===== Final =====
13 May 2026
21:00 CEST

Lazio	0–2	Internazionale
	Report	Marušić 14' (o.g.); L. Martínez 35'

Stadio Olimpico, Rome
Attendance: 68,729
Referee: Marco Guida

==== Supercoppa Italiana ====
Semi-finals
18 December 2025 – Riyadh
Napoli	2
AC Milan	0
19 December 2025 – Riyadh
Bologna (p)	1 (3)
Inter Milan	1 (2)

Final
22 December 2025 – Riyadh
Napoli	2
Bologna	0

===== Final =====
22 December 2025
22:00

Napoli	2–0	Bologna
Neres 39', 57'	Report

King Saud University Stadium, Riyadh
Attendance: 17,869
Referee: Andrea Colombo

=== Women ===
==== Coppa Italia ====
24 May 2026
18:00

Juventus	0–1	Roma
	Report	Giugliano 80'

Stadio Romeo Menti, Vicenza
Attendance: c. 6,000
Referee: Silvia Gasperotti

==== Supercoppa Italiana ====
11 January 2026
15:00 CET

Juventus	2–1	Roma
Vangsgaard 40'; Girelli 85'		Giugliano 23'

Stadio Adriatico – Giovanni Cornacchia, Pescara
Referee: Deborah Bianchi
