= Caroline Møller =

Danish footballer (born 1998)

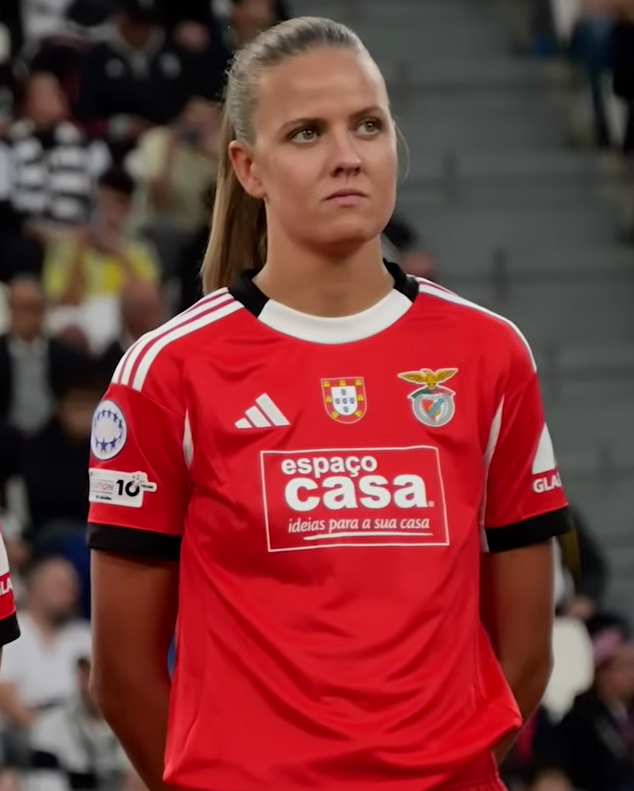
- Møller with Benfica in 2025

Personal information
- Full name: Caroline Møller Hansen
- Date of birth: 19 December 1998 (age 27)
- Place of birth: Hobro, Denmark
- Height: 1.78 m (5 ft 10 in)
- Position: Striker

Team information
- Current team: Benfica
- Number: 10

Youth career
- 2014–2015: IMG Academy

Senior career*
Years	Team	Apps	(Gls)
2013–2014	IK Skovbakken		
2015–2020	Fortuna Hjørring	53	(30)
2020–2021	Inter Milan	20	(5)
2021–2025	Real Madrid	88	(21)
2025–	Benfica	17	(4)

International career^{‡}
2013–2014	Denmark U16	9	(0)
2015–2017	Denmark U19	22	(11)
2017	Denmark U23	3	(1)
2017–	Denmark	17	(0)
- * Club domestic league appearances and goals as of 21:00, 17 may 2026 (UTC) ‡ National team caps and goals as of 23:00, 2 December 2024 (UTC)

Caroline Møller Hansen (born 19 December 1998) is a Danish professional footballer who plays as a striker for the Campeonato Nacional Feminino club Benfica and the Denmark national team.

== Club career ==
Møller began playing football with the Hobro Idræts Klub in her hometown in 2006. At the age of 15 in 2013, she joined the Idrætsklubben Skovbakken, with whom she played for one season on the first team.

After her professional debut, she moved to the United States during the winter break, and entered the IMG Academy in Bradenton, Florida. Upon her return to Denmark in the summer of 2015, she started playing for Danish champion Fortuna Hjørring in the Elite Division. With the club, Møller won three national championships, in 2016, 2018, and 2020. With her team, she finished seconds behind Brøndbyernes Idrætsforening on three occasions. She and her club won two Danish Cups, in 2016 and 2019. With Fortuna, she made her debut in the Champions League on 16 November 2016, in the second leg of the round of 16. In the match, against SSD Brescia, coming on as a substitute in the 70th minute of the match. On 11 September 2019 she scored her first goal in the competition, the final 0–1 in the first leg of the round of 32 against KF Vllaznia Shkodër. She scored a double in the 2–0 victory in the second leg.

In 2020 she moved to Inter Milan for one season.

In 2021 Møller moved to Real Madrid, the team only formed one year prior. Møller became the club's eighth signing before the start of the new season. She scored her first goal on matchday six, in a 2–1 victory against SD Eibar. In the first match of the year for 2024, Møller scored the winning goal in the 2–1 victory over Madrid CFF in the 99th minute.

== International career ==
Møller received her first call-ups from the Danish Football Union in 2013, at the age of 14, for the under-16 team, with which she played nine games until 2014. In 2015 she joined the under-19 team, where she played in the qualifiers for the U19 European Championship in Slovakia 2016 and Northern Ireland 2017, without qualifying for the final phase. By the end of her time with the team in 2017, she had 22 appearances and 11 goals. On the same date, she was selected for the under-23 category.

In August 2017 Møller was selected for the senior national team for a friendly match against the Netherlands, which was cancelled, and for the World Cup qualifier against Hungary. Despite these games being cancelled, she kept her spot on the team. She made her debut for the national team on March 4 at the 2020 Algarve Cup in the 1–2 defeat against Norway, when she was substituted after 61 minutes for Emma Snerle.

== Honours ==
Fortuna Hjørring

- Elitedivisionen: 2015–16, 2019–20
- Danish Women's Cup: 2016

Benfica

- Campeonato Nacional Feminino: 2025–26
- Taça de Portugal: 2025–26
