= 2025–26 UEFA Women's Champions League knockout phase =

Europe premier club football tournament

The 2025–26 UEFA Women's Champions League knockout phase began on 11 February 2026 with the knockout phase play-offs and ended with the final on 23 May 2026 at the Ullevaal Stadion in Oslo, Norway, to decide the champions of the 2025–26 UEFA Women's Champions League. A total of 12 teams competed in the knockout phase, with 8 entering in the play-offs and 4 receiving a bye to the quarter-finals.

Times are CET/CEST, (Note: CET (UTC+1) for dates up to 28 March 2026 (knockout phase play-offs and quarter-finals), and CEST (UTC+2) for dates thereafter (quarter-finals, semi-finals and final).) as listed by UEFA (local times, if different, are in parentheses).

== Qualified teams ==
The knockout phase involved the top 12 teams that qualified from the league phase. The top 4 teams received a bye to the quarter-finals, while teams finishing in positions 5 to 12 entered the knockout phase play-offs.

Entering the quarter-finals (seeded)
Pos	Team
1	(Spain) Barcelona
2	(France) OL Lyonnes
3	(England) Chelsea
4	(Germany) Bayern Munich

Entering the play-offs (seeded)
Pos	Team
5	(England) Arsenal
6	(England) Manchester United
7	(Spain) Real Madrid
8	(Italy) Juventus

Entering the play-offs (unseeded)
Pos	Team
9	(Germany) VfL Wolfsburg
10	(France) Paris FC
11	(Spain) Atlético Madrid
12	(Belgium) OH Leuven

== Format ==
Each tie in the knockout phase, apart from the final, was played over two legs, with each team playing one leg at home. The team that scored more goals on aggregate over the two legs advanced to the next round. If the aggregate score was level, then 30 minutes of extra time were played (the away goals rule was not applied). If the score was still level at the end of extra time, the winners were decided by a penalty shoot-out. In the final, which was played as a single match, if the score was level at the end of normal time, extra time was played, followed by a penalty shoot-out if the score was still level.

== Schedule ==
The schedule of the competition was as follows.

Schedule for 2025–26 UEFA Women's Champions League
Phase	Round	Draw date	First leg	Second leg
Knockout phase	Knockout phase play-offs	18 December 2025	11–12 February 2026	18–19 February 2026
Knockout phase	Quarter-finals	18 December 2025	24–25 March 2026	1–2 April 2026
Knockout phase	Semi-finals	—N/a	25–26 April 2026	2–3 May 2026
Knockout phase	Final	—N/a	23 May 2026 at Ullevaal Stadion, Oslo	

== Bracket ==
Knockout phase play-offs
11	(Spain) Atlético Madrid	0	0	0
6	(England) Manchester United	3	2	5
10	(France) Paris FC	2	0	2
7	(Spain) Real Madrid	3	2	5
12	(Belgium) OH Leuven	0	1	1
5	(England) Arsenal	4	3	7
9	(Germany) VfL Wolfsburg	2	2	4
8	(Italy) Juventus	2	0	2

Quarter-finals
6	(England) Manchester United	2	1	3
4	(Germany) Bayern Munich	3	2	5
7	(Spain) Real Madrid	2	0	2
1	(Spain) Barcelona	6	6	12
5	(England) Arsenal	3	0	3
3	(England) Chelsea	1	1	2
9	(Germany) VfL Wolfsburg	1	0	1
2	(France) OL Lyonnes (a.e.t.)	0	4	4

Semi-finals
4	(Germany) Bayern Munich	1	2	3
1	(Spain) Barcelona	1	4	5
5	(England) Arsenal	2	1	3
2	(France) OL Lyonnes	1	3	4

Final
23 May – Oslo
1	(Spain) Barcelona	4
2	(France) OL Lyonnes	0

== Knockout phase play-offs ==
The draw for the knockout phase play-offs was held on 18 December 2025, 13:00 CET.

=== Seeding ===
The draw was split into two seeded and two unseeded pots, based on the predetermined pairings for the knockout phase. Teams were allocated based on their final position in the league phase. Teams in positions 5 to 8 were seeded (playing the second legs at home), while teams in positions 9 to 12 were unseeded. The draw began with the unseeded teams, allocating them all to a tie. Once completed, all the seeded teams were drawn into a tie as their opponents.

5/6 vs 11/12		7/8 vs 9/10	
Seeded	Unseeded	Seeded	Unseeded
(England) Arsenal; (England) Manchester United	(Spain) Atlético Madrid; (Belgium) OH Leuven	(Spain) Real Madrid; (Italy) Juventus	(Germany) VfL Wolfsburg; (France) Paris FC

=== Summary ===
The first legs were played on 11 and 12 February, and the second legs on 18 and 19 February 2026.

Team 1	Agg.	Team 2	1st leg	2nd leg
Atlético Madrid (Spain)	0–5	(England) Manchester United	0–3	0–2
Paris FC (France)	2–5	(Spain) Real Madrid	2–3	0–2
OH Leuven (Belgium)	1–7	(England) Arsenal	0–4	1–3
VfL Wolfsburg (Germany)	4–2	(Italy) Juventus	2–2	2–0

=== Matches ===
12 February 2026
21:00

Atlético Madrid (Spain)	0–3	(England) Manchester United
	Report	Terland 3'; Malard 39'; Zigiotti Olme 81'

Centro Deportivo Wanda, Alcalá de Henares
Attendance: 1,415
Referee: Silvia Gasperotti (Italy)
19 February 2026
21:00 (20:00 UTC+0)

Manchester United (England)	2–0	(Spain) Atlético Madrid
Zigiotti Olme 28'; Park 41'	Report

Leigh Sports Village, Leigh
Attendance: 4,225
Referee: Stéphanie Frappart (France)

Manchester United won 5–0 on aggregate.

11 February 2026
21:00

Paris FC (France)	2–3	(Spain) Real Madrid
Korošec 10'; Ma. Mendy 89'	Report	Weir 39'; Athenea 45'; Caicedo 83'

Stade Charléty, Paris
Attendance: 6,757
Referee: Ivana Martinčić (Croatia)
18 February 2026
18:45

Real Madrid (Spain)	2–0	(France) Paris FC
Feller 54'; N'Dongala 67' (o.g.)	Report

Alfredo Di Stéfano, Madrid
Attendance: 1,558
Referee: Iuliana Demetrescu (Romania)

Real Madrid won 5–2 on aggregate.

11 February 2026
18:45

OH Leuven (Belgium)	0–4	(England) Arsenal
	Report	Maanum 22', 52'; Smith 37'; Russo 72'

Den Dreef, Leuven
Attendance: 5,860
Referee: Iuliana Demetrescu (Romania)
18 February 2026
21:00 (20:00 UTC+0)

Arsenal (England)	3–1	(Belgium) OH Leuven
Russo 23', 90'; Caldentey 65' (pen.)	Report	Pusztai 29'

Meadow Park, Borehamwood
Attendance: 2,634
Referee: Eleni Antoniou (Greece)

Arsenal won 7–1 on aggregate.

12 February 2026
18:45

VfL Wolfsburg (Germany)	2–2	(Italy) Juventus
Minge 82' (pen.); Linder 90+5'	Report	Capeta 6'; Vangsgaard 61'

AOK Stadion, Wolfsburg
Attendance: 2,452
Referee: Alina Peşu (Romania)
19 February 2026
18:45

Juventus (Italy)	0–2	(Germany) VfL Wolfsburg
	Report	Endemann 18'; Zicai 90+6'

Juventus Stadium, Turin
Attendance: 4,973
Referee: Frida Klarlund (Denmark)

VfL Wolfsburg won 4–2 on aggregate.

== Quarter-finals ==
The draw for the quarter-finals was held on 18 December 2025 (after the knockout phase play-offs draw).

=== Seeding ===
As the bracket was fixed, the draw contained only four seeded pots, based on the predetermined pairings for the knockout phase, with the top-four teams allocated based on their final position in the league phase. Teams in positions 1 to 4 were seeded (playing the second legs at home), while the bracket positions of the winners of the knockout phase play-offs (unseeded) were predetermined. The top-four teams were drawn into the bracket against one of their two possible opponents.

1/2 vs 7/8/9/10		3/4 vs 5/6/11/12	
Seeded	Predetermined	Seeded	Predetermined
(Spain) Barcelona; (France) OL Lyonnes	(Spain) Real Madrid; (Germany) VfL Wolfsburg	(England) Chelsea; (Germany) Bayern Munich	(England) Manchester United; (England) Arsenal

=== Summary ===
The first legs were played on 24 and 25 March, and the second legs on 1 and 2 April 2026.

Quarter-finals
Team 1	Agg.	Team 2	1st leg	2nd leg
Manchester United (England)	3–5	(Germany) Bayern Munich	2–3	1–2
Real Madrid (Spain)	2–12	(Spain) Barcelona	2–6	0–6
Arsenal (England)	3–2	(England) Chelsea	3–1	0–1
VfL Wolfsburg (Germany)	1–4	(France) OL Lyonnes	1–0	0–4 (a.e.t.)

=== Matches ===
25 March 2026
21:00 (20:00 UTC+0)

Manchester United (England)	2–3	(Germany) Bayern Munich
Le Tissier 24' (pen.); Lundkvist 76'	Report	Harder 2', 71'; Tanikawa 84'

Old Trafford, Manchester
Attendance: 7,513
Referee: Olatz Rivera Olmedo (Spain)
1 April 2026
18:45

Bayern Munich (Germany)	2–1	(England) Manchester United
Viggósdóttir 81'; Dallmann 84'	Report	Malard 11'

Allianz Arena, Munich
Attendance: 25,000
Referee: Tess Olofsson (Sweden)

Bayern Munich won 5–3 on aggregate.

25 March 2026
18:45

Real Madrid (Spain)	2–6	(Spain) Barcelona
Caicedo 30', 66'	Report	Pajor 6', 57'; Brugts 13'; Paredes 32'; López 64'; Putellas 89' (pen.)

Alfredo Di Stéfano, Madrid
Attendance: 4,203
Referee: Maria Sole Ferrieri Caputi (Italy)
2 April 2026
18:45

Barcelona (Spain)	6–0	(Spain) Real Madrid
Putellas 8'; Graham Hansen 15', 55'; Paredes 27'; Pajor 34'; Brugts 74'	Report

Camp Nou, Barcelona
Attendance: 60,067
Referee: Stéphanie Frappart (France)

Barcelona won 12–2 on aggregate.

24 March 2026
21:00 (20:00 UTC+0)

Arsenal (England)	3–1	(England) Chelsea
Blackstenius 22'; Kelly 32'; Russo 76'	Report	James 66'

Emirates Stadium, London
Attendance: 18,087
Referee: Alina Peşu (Romania)
1 April 2026
21:00 (20:00 UTC+1)

Chelsea (England)	1–0	(England) Arsenal
Nüsken 90+4'	Report

Stamford Bridge, London
Attendance: 16,117
Referee: Frida Klarlund (Denmark)

Arsenal won 3–2 on aggregate.

24 March 2026
18:45

VfL Wolfsburg (Germany)	1–0	(France) OL Lyonnes
Beerensteyn 14'	Report

Volkswagen Arena, Wolfsburg
Attendance: 5,089
Referee: Emanuela Rusta (Albania)
2 April 2026
21:00

OL Lyonnes (France)	4–0 (a.e.t.)	(Germany) VfL Wolfsburg
Yohannes 16'; Dumornay 102'; Egurrola 105+2'; Chawinga 119'	Report

Parc Olympique Lyonnais, Décines-Charpieu
Attendance: 14,083
Referee: Marta Huerta de Aza (Spain)

OL Lyonnes won 4–1 on aggregate.

== Semi-finals ==
Teams seeded one and two played the second leg at home if they progressed to this stage. If a seeded team was beaten, the team that eliminated them took over their seeding position.

=== Summary ===
The first legs were played on 25 and 26 April, and the second legs on 2 and 3 May 2026.

Semi-finals
Team 1	Agg.	Team 2	1st leg	2nd leg
Bayern Munich (Germany)	3–5	(Spain) Barcelona	1–1	2–4
Arsenal (England)	3–4	(France) OL Lyonnes	2–1	1–3

=== Matches ===
25 April 2026
18:15

Bayern Munich (Germany)	1–1	(Spain) Barcelona
Kett 69'	Report	Pajor 8'

Allianz Arena, Munich
Attendance: 31,000
Referee: Ivana Martinčić (Croatia)
3 May 2026
16:30

Barcelona (Spain)	4–2	(Germany) Bayern Munich
Paralluelo 13'; Putellas 22', 58'; Pajor 54'	Report	Dallmann 17'; Harder 71'

Camp Nou, Barcelona
Attendance: 60,021
Referee: Stéphanie Frappart (France)

Barcelona won 5–3 on aggregate.

26 April 2026
16:30 (15:30 UTC+1)

Arsenal (England)	2–1	(France) OL Lyonnes
Engen 59' (o.g.); Smith 83'	Report	Brand 18'

Emirates Stadium, London
Attendance: 26,758
Referee: Désirée Blanco (Switzerland)
2 May 2026
15:00

OL Lyonnes (France)	3–1	(England) Arsenal
Renard 22' (pen.); Diani 36'; Brand 86'	Report	Russo 76'

Parc Olympique Lyonnais, Décines-Charpieu
Attendance: 22,505
Referee: Maria Sole Ferrieri Caputi (Italy)

OL Lyonnes won 4–3 on aggregate.

== Final ==
The final was played on 23 May 2026 at the Ullevaal Stadion in Oslo. The winner of semi-final 1 was designated as the "home" team for administrative purposes.

23 May 2026
18:00

Barcelona (Spain)	4–0	(France) OL Lyonnes
Pajor 55', 69'; Paralluelo 90', 90+3'	Report

Ullevaal Stadion, Oslo
Attendance: 24,258
Referee: Tess Olofsson (Sweden)
