= Anna Gasper =

German footballer (born 1997)

- Gasper in 2026

Personal information
- Date of birth: 3 January 1997 (age 29)
- Place of birth: Cologne, Germany
- Height: 1.72 m (5 ft 8 in)
- Position: Midfielder

Team information
- Current team: Chicago Stars
- Number: 31

Youth career
- 2002–2011: DJK Südwest Köln
- 2011–2014: Bayer Leverkusen

Senior career*
Years	Team	Apps	(Gls)
2013–2016	Bayer Leverkusen	41	(3)
2016–2020	Turbine Potsdam	67	(11)
2020–2021	→ FC Altera Porta (loan)	0	(0)
2021–2022	→ USC Landhaus (loan)	0	(0)
2022	Austria Wien	7	(1)
2023–2026	Benfica	43	(9)
2026–	Chicago Stars	14	(0)

International career
2014–2016	Germany U19	12	(2)
- * Club domestic league appearances and goals as of 05:47, November 2, 2026 (UTC)

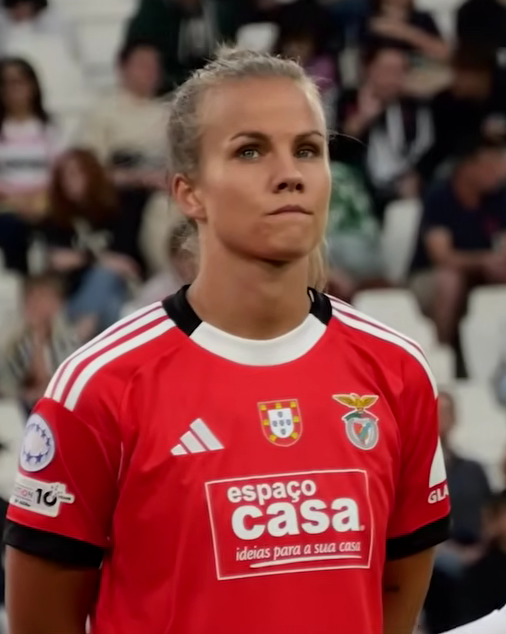
Gasper with Benfica in 2025

Anna Gasper (born 3 January 1997) is a German professional footballer who plays as a midfielder for Chicago Stars FC of the National Women's Soccer League (NWSL).

== Club career ==
Having come to football via her older brothers, Gasper started her career in 2002 in the Bambini team of DJK Südwest Köln. There she played through all the teams until the C-youth in summer 2011, before she moved to the youth department of Bayer 04 Leverkusen for the 2011–12 season. From 2012 she played with Leverkusen's B-Juniorinnen in the B-Juniorinnen-Bundesliga West/Südwest, which was played for the first time this season. With 19 goals she became top scorer of this league in the 2013–14 season. On 13 October 2013 (5th matchday), she made her first appearance in the first team squad in the 5–1 defeat to 1. FFC Turbine Potsdam and also made her Bundesliga debut in this match when she was called up for Turid Knaak in the 70th minute. On 16 February 2014, she made her first appearance in the starting eleven in an away game for MSV Duisburg and was accepted into the Bundesliga squad for the 2014–15 season. On September 7, 2014 (2nd matchday), she scored her first Bundesliga goal in the 2–1 away win against FF USV Jena, scoring the interim 2–0. After a total of 41 league and five cup appearances for Leverkusen, Gasper switched to league rivals 1 FFC Turbine Potsdam for the 2016–17 season, where she signed a two-year contract.

Gasper primarily appeared as a substitute for Turbine Potsdam, until she featured regularly for the club during the 2018–19 season.

In July 2026, Gasper joined National Women's Soccer League (NWSL) club Chicago Stars on a year-and-a-half contract with the option for another year. On 1 August 2026 she made her debut in the 77th minute against Racing Louisville FC.

== International career ==
Gasper went through all the junior women's teams of the Middle Rhine Football Association and participated with them in the Länderpokal in 2011 (U-15), 2012 (U-15, U-17) and 2013 (U-17). In 2014, she was first appointed to the U-19 national team squad and made her debut in the national jersey on 22 October 2014 in a 2–1 defeat to the Swedish team in a test match. Less than a year later, on 17 September 2015, she scored her first international goal in the European Championship qualifying match against Kazakhstan.

In November 2016, she was first selected for the German women's national team but has not appeared in a match as of yet.

== Personal life ==
Anna Gasper passed her Abitur at the Landrat-Lucas-Gymnasium in 2016 and, after moving to Potsdam, began studying to become a police commissioner. She belongs to the sports support group of the Brandenburg state police at the Brandenburg Olympic Base. Her brother Michael Gasper is dance officer of the dance group "Zunft-Müüs", the dance group of the traditional Cologne carnival club Fidele Zunftbrüder von 1919 and her brother Simon Gasper was commander and is dance officer of the KG Sr. Tollität Luftflotte, another carnival club.

== Honors ==
Bayer 04 Leverkusen

- Middle Rhine Cup winner 2012 with the C-Juniorinnen
- Top scorer of the B-Juniorinnen-Bundesliga West/Southwest 2013/14
- DFB-Hallenpokal winner 2015

Benfica

- Campeonato Nacional Feminino: 2022–23, 2023–24, 2024–25, 2025–26
- Taça de Portugal: 2023–24
- Taça da Liga: 2022–23, 2023–24
- Supertaça de Portugal: 2023
