= Thaís Lima =

Brazilian footballer (born 2008)

Personal information
- Full name: Thaís dos Santos Macedo Lima
- Date of birth: 11 April 2008 (age 18)
- Place of birth: Portugal
- Height: 1.77 m (5 ft 10 in)
- Position: Goalkeeper

Team information
- Current team: Benfica
- Number: 12

Youth career
- 2017–2020: Despertar
- 2020–2024: Benfica

Senior career*
Years	Team	Apps	(Gls)
2023–2025	Benfica B	25	(0)
2024–	Benfica	3	(0)

International career^{‡}
2022	Portugal U15	3	(0)
2023–2024	Portugal U17	19	(0)
2024–2025	Portugal U19	17	(0)
2026–	Brazil	2	(0)
- * Club domestic league appearances and goals as of 18:06, 13 February 2026 (UTC) ‡ National team caps and goals as of 10 October 2026

Thaís dos Santos Macedo Lima (born 11 April 2008) is a professional footballer who plays as a goalkeeper for Portuguese club Benfica. Born in Portugal, she represents Brazil internationally.

== Early life ==
Lima was born in Portugal to a Brazilian father and an Angolan mother.

== Club career ==
After playing for FC Despertar, Lima moved to Benfica in 2020. After progressing through the youth setup, she made her senior debut with the B-team on 16 September 2023, playing the entire second-half in a 8–0 home routing of AD Souselas.

Lima later established herself as a first-choice for the B-side, before making her first team debut on 7 September 2024, replacing Rute Costa in a 4–0 win over SFK 2000. On 22 May of the following year, she signed her a professional contract with the club until 2028, being definitely promoted to the main squad.

== International career ==
After representing Portugal at under-15, under-17 and under-19 levels, Lima switched allegiance to Brazil in 2025, and was called up to their senior team in October of that year.
