= 2025–26 UEFA Women's Champions League =

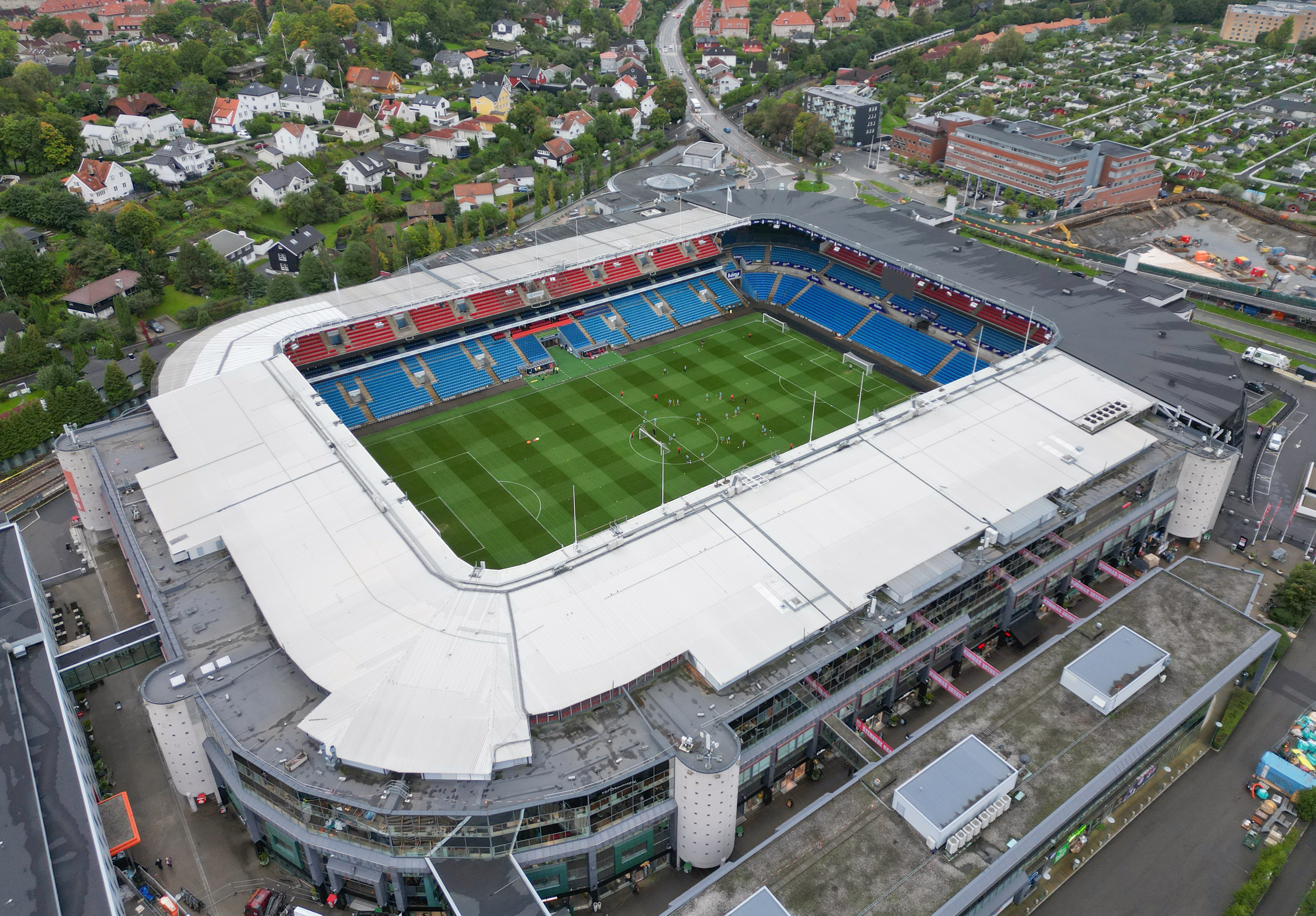
- The Ullevaal Stadion in Oslo hosted the final.

Tournament details
- Dates: Qualifying: 30 July – 18 September 2025; Competition proper: 7 October 2025 – 23 May 2026
- Teams: Competition proper: 18; Total: 74 (from 50 associations)

Final positions
- Champions: (Spain) Barcelona (4th title)
- Runners-up: (France) OL Lyonnes

Tournament statistics
- Matches played: 75
- Goals scored: 258 (3.44 per match)
- Attendance: 554,535 (7,394 per match)
- Top scorer(s): Ewa Pajor (Barcelona); 11 goals
- Best player: Alexia Putellas (Barcelona)
- Best young player: Lily Yohannes (OL Lyonnes)

The 2025–26 UEFA Women's Champions League was the 25th edition of the European women's club football championship organised by UEFA, and the 17th edition since being rebranded as the UEFA Women's Champions League. It started on 30 July 2025 and ended with the final on 23 May 2026. This was the first season under a new format, which had 18 participating teams, playing six games each against different opponents in a league phase, all in a joint group. The winners automatically qualified for the 2026–27 UEFA Women's Champions League league phase, the 2027 FIFA Women's Champions Cup semi-finals and the 2028 FIFA Women's Club World Cup. Video assistant referee (VAR) was used from the league phase onwards.

The Ullevaal Stadion in Oslo hosted the final. Barcelona won the match 4–0 against OL Lyonnes for their fourth title.

Arsenal were the defending champions, but were eliminated by OL Lyonnes in the semi-finals.

== Association team allocation ==
The association ranking based on the UEFA women's country coefficients was used to determine the number of participating teams for each association:

- Associations 1–7 each had three teams qualify.
- Associations 8–17 each had two teams qualify.
- All other associations, if they entered, each had one team qualify.
- The winners of the 2024–25 UEFA Women's Champions League were given an additional entry if they did not qualify for the 2025–26 UEFA Women's Champions League through their domestic league.

An association had to have an eleven-a-side women's domestic league to enter a team. As of 2019–20, 52 of the 55 UEFA member associations had organized a women's domestic league, with the exceptions being Andorra (1 club in Spain), Liechtenstein (3 clubs in Switzerland) and San Marino (1 club in Italy).

=== Association ranking ===
For the 2025–26 UEFA Women's Champions League, the associations were allocated places according to their 2024 UEFA women's Association coefficients, which took into account their performance in European competitions from 2019–20 to 2023–24.

Apart from the allocation based on association coefficients, associations could have additional teams participating in the Champions League, as noted below:

- (TH) – Additional berth for UEFA Women's Champions League title holders

Association ranking for 2025–26 UEFA Women's Champions League

Rank	Association	Coeff.	Teams	Notes
1	France	78.333	3	
2	Germany	68.999	3	
3	Spain	68.166	3	
4	England	59.999	3	
5	Portugal	34.000	3	
6	Italy	34.000	3	
7	Sweden	24.999	3	
8	Czech Republic	22.332	2	
9	Netherlands	22.000	2	
10	Denmark	21.750	2	
11	Norway	21.500	2	
12	Austria	21.250	2	
13	Ukraine	19.000	2	
14	Belarus	18.000	2	
15	Iceland	17.750	2	
16	Scotland	17.000	2	
17	Kazakhstan	14.750	2	
18	Switzerland	14.250	1	
19	Serbia	14.000	1	

Rank	Association	Coeff.	Teams	Notes
20	Albania	14.000	1	
21	Cyprus	12.000	1	
22	Belgium	12.000	1	
23	Russia	10.250	0	
24	Finland	10.000	1	
25	Bosnia and Herzegovina	10.000	1	
26	Hungary	9.500	1	
27	Romania	9.000	1	
28	Slovenia	9.000	1	
29	Poland	9.000	1	
30	Croatia	8.500	1	
31	Lithuania	8.500	1	
32	Republic of Ireland	8.000	1	
33	Kosovo	8.000	1	
34	Turkey	7.500	1	
35	Greece	7.000	1	
36	Israel	7.000	1	
37	Georgia	7.000	1	

Rank	Association	Coeff.	Teams	Notes
38	Montenegro	7.000	1	
39	Slovakia	6.500	1	
40	Bulgaria	6.500	1	
41	Luxembourg	6.000	1	
42	Wales	6.000	1	
43	Estonia	5.500	1	
44	Northern Ireland	5.500	1	
45	Latvia	5.500	1	
46	Malta	5.500	1	
47	Moldova	4.500	1	
48	North Macedonia	4.000	1	
49	Faroe Islands	4.000	1	
50	Armenia	3.000	1	
NR	Azerbaijan	—	1	
NR	Gibraltar	—	0	DNE
NR	Andorra	—	0	NL
NR	Liechtenstein	—	0	NL
NR	San Marino	—	0	NL

=== Distribution ===
		Teams entering in this round	Teams advancing from the previous round
First round	Champions Path (21 teams)	21 champions from associations 30 and 32–51	
Second round	Champions Path (28 teams)	21 champions from associations 7–11 and 13–29 (except Russia); 1 champion from association 31 as the team with the highest club coefficient, originally from the Round 1	6 mini-tournament winners from the first round
Second round	League Path (15 teams)	11 runners-up from associations 6 and 8–17; 4 third-placed teams from associations 4–7	
Third round	Champions Path (8 teams)	1 champion from association 12 as the team with the highest club coefficient, originally from the Round 2 of the Champions Path	7 mini-tournament winners from the second round
Third round	League Path (10 teams)	2 runners-up from associations 3 and 5; 3 third-placed teams from associations 1–3; 1 runner-up from association 7 as the team with the highest club coefficient, originally from the Round 2 of the League Path	4 mini-tournament winners from the second round
League phase (18 teams)		UEFA Women's Champions League title holder; 6 champions from associations 1–6; 2 runners-up from associations 1–2	4 winners from the third round (Champions Path); 5 winners from the third round (League Path)
Knockout phase play-offs (8 teams)			8 teams ranked 5–12 from the league phase
Quarter-finals (8 teams)			4 teams ranked 1–4 from the league phase; 4 winners from the knockout phase play-offs

Due to the suspension of Russia, the following changes to the access list were made:

- The champions of associations 29 (Poland) entered the second qualifying round (Champions Path) instead of the first qualifying round (Champions Path).

As the Champions League title holders (Arsenal) qualified for the third qualifying round (League Path) via their domestic league's standard berth allocation, the following changes to the default access list were made:

- BK Häcken as the club with the highest club coefficient that would otherwise have entered the second qualifying round (League Path), entered the third qualifying round (League Path) instead.

Since this season marked the inaugural edition of the UEFA Women's Europa Cup, with no title holders from previous season, the following changes to the default access list were made:

- St. Pölten as the club with the highest club coefficient that would otherwise have entered the second qualifying round (Champions Path), entered the third qualifying round (Champions Path).
- Gintra as the club with the highest club coefficient that would otherwise have entered the first qualifying round (Champions Path), entered the second qualifying round (Champions Path).

=== Teams ===
The labels in the parentheses show how each team qualified for the place of its starting round:

- TH: Title holders
- 1st, 2nd, 3rd: League positions of the previous season

Two qualifying rounds, round 2 and round 3, were divided into Champions Path (CH) and League Path (LP).

Qualified teams for 2025–26 UEFA Women's Champions League
Entry round		Teams			
League phase		(England) Arsenal (TH)^{2nd}	(France) OL Lyonnes (1st)	(France) Paris Saint-Germain (2nd)	(Germany) Bayern Munich (1st)
League phase		(Germany) VfL Wolfsburg (2nd)	(Spain) Barcelona (1st)	(England) Chelsea (1st)	(Portugal) Benfica (1st)
League phase		(Italy) Juventus (1st)			
Round 3	CH	(Austria) St. Pölten (1st)			
Round 3	LP	(France) Paris FC (3rd)	(Germany) Eintracht Frankfurt (3rd)	(Spain) Real Madrid (2nd)	(Spain) Atlético Madrid (3rd)
Round 3	LP	(Portugal) Sporting CP (2nd)	(Sweden) BK Häcken (2nd)		
Round 2	CH	(Sweden) Rosengård (1st)	(Czech Republic) Slavia Prague (1st)	(Netherlands) Twente (1st)	(Denmark) Fortuna Hjørring (1st)
Round 2	CH	(Norway) Vålerenga (1st)	(Ukraine) Vorskla Poltava (1st)	(Belarus) Dinamo Minsk (1st)	(Iceland) Breiðablik (1st)
Round 2	CH	(Scotland) Hibernian (1st)	(Kazakhstan) BIIK Shymkent (1st)	(Switzerland) Young Boys (1st)	(Serbia) Red Star Belgrade (1st)
Round 2	CH	(Albania) Vllaznia (1st)	(Cyprus) Apollon Ladies (1st)	(Belgium) OH Leuven (1st)	(Finland) HJK (1st)
Round 2	CH	(Bosnia and Herzegovina) SFK 2000 (1st)	(Hungary) Ferencváros (1st)	(Romania) Farul Constanța (1st)	(Slovenia) Mura (1st)
Round 2	CH	(Poland) GKS Katowice (1st)	(Lithuania) Gintra (1st)		
Round 2	LP	(England) Manchester United (3rd)	(Portugal) Braga (3rd)	(Italy) Inter Milan (2nd)	(Italy) Roma (3rd)
Round 2	LP	(Sweden) Hammarby IF (3rd)	(Czech Republic) Sparta Prague (2nd)	(Netherlands) PSV Eindhoven (2nd)	(Denmark) Nordsjælland (2nd)
Round 2	LP	(Norway) Brann (2nd)	Austria Wien (2nd)	(Ukraine) Metalist 1925 Kharkiv (2nd)	(Belarus) FC Minsk (2nd)
Round 2	LP	(Iceland) Valur (2nd)	(Scotland) Glasgow City (2nd)	(Kazakhstan) Aktobe (2nd)	
Round 1	CH	(Croatia) Agram (1st)	(Republic of Ireland) Athlone Town (1st)	(Kosovo) Mitrovica (1st)	(Turkey) ABB Fomget (1st)
Round 1	CH	(Greece) AEK Athens (1st)	(Israel) Kiryat Gat (1st)	(Georgia (country)) Lanchkhuti (1st)	(Montenegro) Budućnost Podgorica (1st)
Round 1	CH	(Slovakia) Spartak Myjava (1st)	(Bulgaria) NSA Sofia (1st)	(Luxembourg) Racing Union (1st)	(Wales) Cardiff City (1st)
Round 1	CH	(Estonia) Flora (1st)	(Northern Ireland) Cliftonville (1st)	(Latvia) Riga FC (1st)	(Malta) Swieqi United (1st)
Round 1	CH	(Moldova) Agarista Anenii Noi (1st)	(North Macedonia) Ljuboten (1st)	(Faroe Islands) NSÍ Runavík (1st)	(Armenia) Pyunik (1st)
Round 1	CH	(Azerbaijan) Neftçi (1st)			

Notes

1. Arsenal (ARS): Arsenal entered the league phase as UEFA Women's Champions League title holders. They had also qualified for the third qualifying round (League Path) as English runners-up; that domestic berth was rebalanced.
2. Russia (RUS): On 28 February 2022, Russian football clubs and national teams were suspended from FIFA and UEFA competitions. The tables reflect Russia's ongoing suspension from UEFA competitions.

== Schedule ==
The schedule of the competition was as follows.

Schedule for 2025–26 UEFA Women's Champions League
Phase	Round	Draw date	First leg	Second leg
Qualifying	First qualifying round	24 June 2025	30 July 2025 (semi-finals)	2 August 2025 (third-place play-off & final)
Qualifying	Second qualifying round	24 June 2025	27 August 2025 (semi-finals)	30 August 2025 (third-place play-off & final)
Qualifying	Third qualifying round	31 August 2025	11 September 2025	18 September 2025
League phase	Matchday 1	19 September 2025	7–8 October 2025	
League phase	Matchday 2	19 September 2025	15–16 October 2025	
League phase	Matchday 3	19 September 2025	11–12 November 2025	
League phase	Matchday 4	19 September 2025	19–20 November 2025	
League phase	Matchday 5	19 September 2025	9–10 December 2025	
League phase	Matchday 6	19 September 2025	17 December 2025	
Knockout phase	Knockout phase play-offs	18 December 2025	11–12 February 2026	18–19 February 2026
Knockout phase	Quarter-finals	18 December 2025	24–25 March 2026	1–2 April 2026
Knockout phase	Semi-finals	—N/a	25–26 April 2026	2–3 May 2026
Knockout phase	Final	—N/a	23 May 2026 at Ullevaal Stadion, Oslo	

== Qualifying rounds ==
=== First qualifying round ===
==== Champions Path ====
Tournament 1

Hosted by Racing Union.

Semi-finals
30 July
(Luxembourg) Racing Union (a.e.t.)	5
(Greece) AEK Athens	3
30 July
(Estonia) Flora	1
(Latvia) Riga FC	4

Final
2 August
(Luxembourg) Racing Union	2
(Latvia) Riga FC	1
Third place
2 August
(Greece) AEK Athens	1
(Estonia) Flora	0

Tournament 2

Hosted by Spartak Myjava.

Semi-finals
30 July
(Moldova) Agarista Anenii Noi	0
(Malta) Swieqi United	5
30 July
(Slovakia) Spartak Myjava	3
(Montenegro) Budućnost Podgorica	0

Final
2 August
(Malta) Swieqi United	1
(Slovakia) Spartak Myjava (a.e.t.)	2
Third place
2 August
(Moldova) Agarista Anenii Noi	0
(Montenegro) Budućnost Podgorica	3

Tournament 3

Hosted by Ljuboten.

Semi-finals
30 July
(North Macedonia) Ljuboten	4
(Faroe Islands) NSÍ Runavík	1
30 July
(Bulgaria) NSA Sofia	0
(Armenia) Pyunik	1

Final
2 August
(North Macedonia) Ljuboten	4
(Armenia) Pyunik	0
Third place
2 August
(Faroe Islands) NSÍ Runavík	4
(Bulgaria) NSA Sofia	0

Tournament 4

Hosted in a neutral venue.

Semi-finals
30 July
(Turkey) ABB Fomget	2
(Azerbaijan) Neftçi	0

Final
2 August
(Israel) Kiryat Gat	1
(Turkey) ABB Fomget	3

Tournament 5

Hosted by Athlone Town.

Semi-finals
30 July
(Wales) Cardiff City	0
(Republic of Ireland) Athlone Town	4

Final
2 August
(Croatia) Agram	0
(Republic of Ireland) Athlone Town	3

Tournament 6

Hosted by Mitrovica.

Semi-finals
30 July
(Kosovo) Mitrovica	1
(Northern Ireland) Cliftonville (a.e.t.)	3

Final
2 August
(Georgia (country)) Lanchkhuti	2
(Northern Ireland) Cliftonville	1

=== Second qualifying round ===
==== Champions Path ====
Tournament 1

Hosted by Mura.

Semi-finals
27 August
(Slovenia) Mura	3
(Slovakia) Spartak Myjava	2
27 August
(Kazakhstan) BIIK Shymkent	0
(Poland) GKS Katowice	2

Final
30 August
(Slovenia) Mura	0
(Poland) GKS Katowice	2
Third place
30 August
(Slovakia) Spartak Myjava	1
(Kazakhstan) BIIK Shymkent	2

Tournament 2

Hosted by Apollon Ladies.

Semi-finals
27 August
(Cyprus) Apollon Ladies	0
(Switzerland) Young Boys	1
27 August
(Denmark) Fortuna Hjørring	2
(Scotland) Hibernian	1

Final
30 August
(Switzerland) Young Boys	0
(Denmark) Fortuna Hjørring	1
Third place
30 August
(Cyprus) Apollon Ladies	2
(Scotland) Hibernian	3

Tournament 3

Hosted by OH Leuven.

Semi-finals
27 August
(Bosnia and Herzegovina) SFK 2000	1
(Belgium) OH Leuven (a.e.t.)	2
27 August
(Sweden) Rosengård	5
(North Macedonia) Ljuboten	0

Final
30 August
(Belgium) OH Leuven	3
(Sweden) Rosengård	2
Third place
30 August
(Bosnia and Herzegovina) SFK 2000	5
(North Macedonia) Ljuboten	0

Tournament 4

Hosted by Vllaznia.

Semi-finals
27 August
(Hungary) Ferencváros	3
(Luxembourg) Racing Union	0
27 August
(Albania) Vllaznia	1
(Belarus) Dinamo Minsk	2

Final
30 August
(Hungary) Ferencváros	4
(Belarus) Dinamo Minsk	0
Third place
30 August
(Luxembourg) Racing Union	1
(Albania) Vllaznia	3

Tournament 5

Hosted by Gintra.

Semi-finals
27 August
(Lithuania) Gintra	2
(Romania) Farul Constanța	1
27 August
(Ukraine) Vorskla Poltava	5
(Georgia (country)) Lanchkhuti	0

Final
30 August
(Lithuania) Gintra	0
(Ukraine) Vorskla Poltava	2
Third place
30 August
(Romania) Farul Constanța	4
(Georgia (country)) Lanchkhuti	1

Tournament 6

Hosted by Twente.

Semi-finals
27 August
(Netherlands) Twente	6
(Serbia) Red Star Belgrade	0
27 August
(Iceland) Breiðablik	3
(Republic of Ireland) Athlone Town	1

Final
30 August
(Netherlands) Twente	2
(Iceland) Breiðablik	0
Third place
30 August
(Serbia) Red Star Belgrade	0
(Republic of Ireland) Athlone Town	2

Tournament 7

Hosted by HJK.

Semi-finals
27 August
(Czech Republic) Slavia Prague	2
(Turkey) ABB Fomget	1
27 August
(Norway) Vålerenga	1
(Finland) HJK	0

Final
30 August
(Czech Republic) Slavia Prague	0
(Norway) Vålerenga	4
Third place
30 August
(Turkey) ABB Fomget	3
(Finland) HJK	2

==== League Path ====
Tournament 1

Hosted by Hammarby IF.

Semi-finals
27 August
(Sweden) Hammarby IF	5
(Ukraine) Metalist 1925 Kharkiv	4
27 August
(England) Manchester United	4
(Netherlands) PSV Eindhoven	0

Final
30 August
(Sweden) Hammarby IF	0
(England) Manchester United	1
Third place
30 August
(Ukraine) Metalist 1925 Kharkiv	0
(Netherlands) PSV Eindhoven	2

Tournament 2

Hosted by Sparta Prague.

Semi-finals
27 August
(Italy) Roma	2
(Kazakhstan) Aktobe	0
27 August
(Czech Republic) Sparta Prague (a.e.t.) (p)	4 (4)
(Denmark) Nordsjælland	4 (3)

Final
30 August
(Italy) Roma	5
(Czech Republic) Sparta Prague	1
Third place
30 August
(Kazakhstan) Aktobe	2
(Denmark) Nordsjælland	4

Tournament 3

Hosted by Inter Milan.

Semi-finals
27 August
(Iceland) Valur	1
(Portugal) Braga	3
27 August
(Norway) Brann	2
(Italy) Inter Milan	1

Final
30 August
(Portugal) Braga	0
(Norway) Brann	1
Third place
30 August
(Iceland) Valur	1
(Italy) Inter Milan	4

Tournament 4

Hosted by Austria Wien.

Semi-finals
27 August
(Scotland) Glasgow City	0
Austria Wien	2

Final
30 August
(Belarus) FC Minsk	0
Austria Wien	3

=== Third qualifying round ===
The first legs were played on 11 September, and the second legs were played on 18 September 2025. The winners of the ties advanced to the league phase.

Third qualifying round
Team 1	Agg.	Team 2	1st leg	2nd leg
Champions Path
Vålerenga (Norway)	5–1	(Hungary) Ferencváros	3–0	2–1
Vorskla Poltava (Ukraine)	0–2	(Belgium) OH Leuven	0–2	0–0
St. Pölten (Austria)	5–2	(Denmark) Fortuna Hjørring	3–1	2–1
GKS Katowice (Poland)	1–8	(Netherlands) Twente	0–4	1–4
League Path
BK Häcken (Sweden)	2–3	(Spain) Atlético Madrid	1–1	1–2 (a.e.t.)
Paris FC (France)	2–0	Austria Wien	0–0	2–0
Brann (Norway)	1–3	(England) Manchester United	1–0	0–3
Eintracht Frankfurt (Germany)	1–5	(Spain) Real Madrid	1–2	0–3
Roma (Italy)	3–2	(Portugal) Sporting CP	1–2	2–0

== League phase ==
Location of teams of the 2025–26 UEFA Women's Champions League league phase

The league phase draw for the 2025–26 UEFA Women's Champions League took place on 19 September 2025. The 18 teams were divided into three pots of six teams. Each team faced two opponents from each of the three pots, one at home and one away.

Sweden's Damallsvenskan, despite being one of the strongest leagues in the world, was without any Champions League teams this season for the first time in history, after BK Häcken, Hammarby IF and FC Rosengård were knocked out and sent to the Europa Cup.

=== Table ===
Pos	Team	Pld	W	D	L	GF	GA	GD	Pts	Qualification
1	(Royal Spanish Football Federation) Barcelona	6	5	1	0	20	3	+17	16	Advance to the quarter-finals (seeded)
2	(French Football Federation) OL Lyonnes	6	5	1	0	18	5	+13	16	Advance to the quarter-finals (seeded)
3	(The Football Association) Chelsea	6	4	2	0	20	3	+17	14	Advance to the quarter-finals (seeded)
4	(German Football Association) Bayern Munich	6	4	1	1	14	13	+1	13	Advance to the quarter-finals (seeded)
5	(The Football Association) Arsenal	6	4	0	2	11	6	+5	12	Advance to the knockout phase play-offs (seeded)
6	(The Football Association) Manchester United	6	4	0	2	7	9	−2	12	Advance to the knockout phase play-offs (seeded)
7	(Royal Spanish Football Federation) Real Madrid	6	3	2	1	13	7	+6	11	Advance to the knockout phase play-offs (seeded)
8	(Italian Football Federation) Juventus	6	3	1	2	13	8	+5	10	Advance to the knockout phase play-offs (seeded)
9	(German Football Association) VfL Wolfsburg	6	3	0	3	13	10	+3	9	Advance to the knockout phase play-offs (unseeded)
10	(French Football Federation) Paris FC	6	2	2	2	6	9	−3	8	Advance to the knockout phase play-offs (unseeded)
11	(Royal Spanish Football Federation) Atlético Madrid	6	2	1	3	13	9	+4	7	Advance to the knockout phase play-offs (unseeded)
12	(Royal Belgian Football Association) OH Leuven	6	1	3	2	5	10	−5	6	Advance to the knockout phase play-offs (unseeded)
13	(Norwegian Football Federation) Vålerenga	6	1	1	4	4	9	−5	4	
14	(Italian Football Federation) Roma	6	1	1	4	9	19	−10	4	
15	(Royal Dutch Football Association) Twente	6	0	3	3	4	10	−6	3	
16	(Portuguese Football Federation) Benfica	6	0	2	4	4	11	−7	2	
17	(French Football Federation) Paris Saint-Germain	6	0	2	4	4	12	−8	2	
18	(Austrian Football Association) St. Pölten	6	0	1	5	3	28	−25	1	

Source: UEFA
Rules for classification: League phase tiebreakers

=== Results ===
Matchday 1
Home team	Score	Away team
Juventus (Italy)	2–1	(Portugal) Benfica
Arsenal (England)	1–2	(France) OL Lyonnes
Barcelona (Spain)	7–1	(Germany) Bayern Munich
Paris FC (France)	2–2	(Belgium) OH Leuven
Twente (Netherlands)	1–1	(England) Chelsea
Real Madrid (Spain)	6–2	(Italy) Roma
St. Pölten (Austria)	0–6	(Spain) Atlético Madrid
Manchester United (England)	1–0	(Norway) Vålerenga
VfL Wolfsburg (Germany)	4–0	(France) Paris Saint-Germain

Matchday 2
Home team	Score	Away team
OL Lyonnes (France)	3–0	(Austria) St. Pölten
Vålerenga (Norway)	1–2	(Germany) VfL Wolfsburg
Chelsea (England)	4–0	(France) Paris FC
Roma (Italy)	0–4	(Spain) Barcelona
OH Leuven (Belgium)	2–1	(Netherlands) Twente
Atlético Madrid (Spain)	0–1	(England) Manchester United
Bayern Munich (Germany)	2–1	(Italy) Juventus
Paris Saint-Germain (France)	1–2	(Spain) Real Madrid
Benfica (Portugal)	0–2	(England) Arsenal

Matchday 3
Home team	Score	Away team
Roma (Italy)	0–1	(Norway) Vålerenga
OL Lyonnes (France)	3–1	(Germany) VfL Wolfsburg
Real Madrid (Spain)	1–1	(France) Paris FC
St. Pölten (Austria)	0–6	(England) Chelsea
Barcelona (Spain)	3–0	(Belgium) OH Leuven
Bayern Munich (Germany)	3–2	(England) Arsenal
Benfica (Portugal)	1–1	(Netherlands) Twente
Manchester United (England)	2–1	(France) Paris Saint-Germain
Atlético Madrid (Spain)	1–2	(Italy) Juventus

Matchday 4
Home team	Score	Away team
VfL Wolfsburg (Germany)	5–2	(England) Manchester United
Juventus (Italy)	3–3	(France) OL Lyonnes
Arsenal (England)	2–1	(Spain) Real Madrid
Vålerenga (Norway)	2–2	(Austria) St. Pölten
Paris FC (France)	2–0	(Portugal) Benfica
Twente (Netherlands)	0–4	(Spain) Atlético Madrid
Chelsea (England)	1–1	(Spain) Barcelona
Paris Saint-Germain (France)	1–3	(Germany) Bayern Munich
OH Leuven (Belgium)	1–1	(Italy) Roma

Matchday 5
Home team	Score	Away team
St. Pölten (Austria)	0–5	(Italy) Juventus
Arsenal (England)	1–0	(Netherlands) Twente
Paris Saint-Germain (France)	0–0	(Belgium) OH Leuven
Real Madrid (Spain)	2–0	(Germany) VfL Wolfsburg
Barcelona (Spain)	3–1	(Portugal) Benfica
Vålerenga (Norway)	0–1	(France) Paris FC
Chelsea (England)	6–0	(Italy) Roma
Manchester United (England)	0–3	(France) OL Lyonnes
Atlético Madrid (Spain)	2–2	(Germany) Bayern Munich

Matchday 6
Home team	Score	Away team
OL Lyonnes (France)	4–0	(Spain) Atlético Madrid
Bayern Munich (Germany)	3–0	(Norway) Vålerenga
VfL Wolfsburg (Germany)	1–2	(England) Chelsea
Juventus (Italy)	0–1	(England) Manchester United
Benfica (Portugal)	1–1	(France) Paris Saint-Germain
Roma (Italy)	6–1	(Austria) St. Pölten
Twente (Netherlands)	1–1	(Spain) Real Madrid
Paris FC (France)	0–2	(Spain) Barcelona
OH Leuven (Belgium)	0–3	(England) Arsenal

== Knockout phase ==
=== Bracket ===
Knockout phase play-offs
11	(Spain) Atlético Madrid	0	0	0
6	(England) Manchester United	3	2	5
10	(France) Paris FC	2	0	2
7	(Spain) Real Madrid	3	2	5
12	(Belgium) OH Leuven	0	1	1
5	(England) Arsenal	4	3	7
9	(Germany) VfL Wolfsburg	2	2	4
8	(Italy) Juventus	2	0	2

Quarter-finals
6	(England) Manchester United	2	1	3
4	(Germany) Bayern Munich	3	2	5
7	(Spain) Real Madrid	2	0	2
1	(Spain) Barcelona	6	6	12
5	(England) Arsenal	3	0	3
3	(England) Chelsea	1	1	2
9	(Germany) VfL Wolfsburg	1	0	1
2	(France) OL Lyonnes (a.e.t.)	0	4	4

Semi-finals
4	(Germany) Bayern Munich	1	2	3
1	(Spain) Barcelona	1	4	5
5	(England) Arsenal	2	1	3
2	(France) OL Lyonnes	1	3	4

Final
23 May – Oslo
1	(Spain) Barcelona	4
2	(France) OL Lyonnes	0

=== Knockout phase play-offs ===
The draw for the knockout phase play-offs was held on 18 December 2025, 13:00 CET. The first legs were played on 11 and 12 February, and the second legs on 18 and 19 February 2026.

Team 1	Agg.	Team 2	1st leg	2nd leg
Atlético Madrid (Spain)	0–5	(England) Manchester United	0–3	0–2
Paris FC (France)	2–5	(Spain) Real Madrid	2–3	0–2
OH Leuven (Belgium)	1–7	(England) Arsenal	0–4	1–3
VfL Wolfsburg (Germany)	4–2	(Italy) Juventus	2–2	2–0

=== Quarter-finals ===
The draw for the quarter-finals was held on 18 December 2025 (after the knockout phase play-offs draw). The first legs were played on 24 and 25 March, and the second legs on 1 and 2 April 2026.

Quarter-finals
Team 1	Agg.	Team 2	1st leg	2nd leg
Manchester United (England)	3–5	(Germany) Bayern Munich	2–3	1–2
Real Madrid (Spain)	2–12	(Spain) Barcelona	2–6	0–6
Arsenal (England)	3–2	(England) Chelsea	3–1	0–1
VfL Wolfsburg (Germany)	1–4	(France) OL Lyonnes	1–0	0–4 (a.e.t.)

=== Semi-finals ===
Teams seeded one and two played the second leg at home if they progressed to this stage. If a seeded team was beaten, the team that eliminated them took over their seeding position. The first legs were played on 25 and 26 April, and the second legs on 2 and 3 May 2026.

Semi-finals
Team 1	Agg.	Team 2	1st leg	2nd leg
Bayern Munich (Germany)	3–5	(Spain) Barcelona	1–1	2–4
Arsenal (England)	3–4	(France) OL Lyonnes	2–1	1–3

=== Final ===
The final was played on 23 May 2026 at the Ullevaal Stadion in Oslo. The winner of semi-final 1 was designated as the "home" team for administrative purposes.

23 May 2026
18:00 UTC+2

Barcelona (Spain)	4–0	(France) OL Lyonnes
Pajor 55', 69'; Paralluelo 90', 90+3'	Report

Ullevaal Stadion, Oslo
Attendance: 24,258
Referee: Tess Olofsson (Sweden)

== Statistics ==
Statistics exclude qualifying rounds.

=== Top goalscorers ===
Rank	Player	Team	Goals
1	(Poland) Ewa Pajor	(Spain) Barcelona	11
2	(England) Alessia Russo	(England) Arsenal	9
3	(Denmark) Pernille Harder	(Germany) Bayern Munich	8
4	(Spain) Alexia Putellas	(Spain) Barcelona	7
5	(Netherlands) Lineth Beerensteyn	(Germany) VfL Wolfsburg	5
5	(Scotland) Caroline Weir	(Spain) Real Madrid	5
5	(Haiti) Melchie Dumornay	(France) OL Lyonnes	5
5	(Canada) Evelyne Viens	(Italy) Roma	5
9	(Colombia) Linda Caicedo	(Spain) Real Madrid	4
9	(Netherlands) Esmee Brugts	(Spain) Barcelona	4
9	(France) Melvine Malard	(England) Manchester United	4
9	(Spain) Fiamma Benítez	(Spain) Atlético Madrid	4
9	(Norway) Caroline Graham Hansen	(Spain) Barcelona	4
9	(France) Wendie Renard	(France) OL Lyonnes	4
9	(Spain) Salma Paralluelo	(Spain) Barcelona	4

=== Team of the season ===
The UEFA technical study group selected the following players as the team of the tournament.

Pos.	Player	Team
GK	(Spain) Cata Coll	(Spain) Barcelona
DF	(United States) Emily Fox	(England) Arsenal
DF	(France) Wendie Renard	(France) OL Lyonnes
DF	(Spain) Mapi León	(Spain) Barcelona
DF	(France) Selma Bacha	(France) OL Lyonnes
MF	(Haiti) Melchie Dumornay	(France) OL Lyonnes
MF	(Spain) Patricia Guijarro	(Spain) Barcelona
MF	(Spain) Alexia Putellas	(Spain) Barcelona
FW	(Poland) Ewa Pajor	(Spain) Barcelona
FW	(Denmark) Pernille Harder	(Germany) Bayern Munich
FW	(England) Alessia Russo	(England) Arsenal

=== Player of the season ===
- (Spain) Alexia Putellas ( (Spain) Barcelona)

=== Young player of the season ===
- (United States) Lily Yohannes ( (France) OL Lyonnes)

== See also ==
- 2025–26 UEFA Women's Europa Cup
- 2025–26 UEFA Champions League
- 2025–26 UEFA Europa League
- 2025–26 UEFA Conference League
- 2025 UEFA Super Cup
- 2025–26 UEFA Youth League
