= 2025–26 UEFA Women's Champions League league phase =

International football club competition in Europe

The 2025–26 UEFA Women's Champions League league phase began on 7 October 2025 and ended on 17 December 2025. A total of 18 teams competed in the league phase to decide the 12 places in the knockout phase of the 2025–26 UEFA Women's Champions League.

== Format ==
Each team played six matches, three at home and three away, against six different opponents, with all teams ranked in a single league table (known as the Swiss system). Teams were separated into three pots based on their 2025 UEFA club coefficients, and each team played two teams from each of the three pots – one at home and one away. The top four teams in the standings received a bye to the quarter-finals. The teams ranked from fifth to eighth contested the knockout phase play-offs, with the teams ranked from 9th to 12th. Teams ranked from 13th to 18th were eliminated.

=== Tiebreakers ===
Teams were ranked according to points (3 points for a win, 1 point for a draw, 0 points for a loss). If two or more teams were equal on points upon completion of the league phase, the following tiebreaking criteria was applied, in the order given, to determine their rankings:

While the league phase was in progress, teams were ranked according to criteria 1–5 only, and if still tied, were given equal ranking and sorted alphabetically. Criteria 6–10 were only used after the final matches have taken place.

1. Goal difference;
2. Goals scored;
3. Away goals scored;
4. Wins;
5. Away wins;
6. Higher number of points obtained collectively by league phase opponents;
7. Superior collective goal difference of league phase opponents;
8. Higher number of goals scored collectively by league phase opponents;
9. Lower disciplinary points total (direct red card or expulsion for two yellow cards in one match = 3 points, yellow card = 1 point);
10. UEFA club coefficient.

== Teams and seeding ==
Key to colours
Teams ranked 1 to 4 advanced to the quarter-finals as a seeded team
Teams ranked 5 to 8 advanced to the knockout phase play-offs as a seeded team
Teams ranked 9 to 12 advanced to the knockout phase play-offs as an unseeded team

Pot 1
Team	Notes	Coeff.
(England) Arsenal		55.000
(Spain) Barcelona		124.000
(France) OL Lyonnes		104.000
(England) Chelsea		93.000
(Germany) Bayern Munich		76.000
(Germany) VfL Wolfsburg		69.000

Pot 2
Team	Notes	Coeff.
(France) Paris Saint-Germain		69.000
(Spain) Real Madrid		43.000
(Italy) Juventus		39.000
(Portugal) Benfica		33.000
(Italy) Roma		32.000
(Austria) St. Pölten		27.000

Pot 3
Team	Notes	Coeff.
(Netherlands) Twente		16.000
(Norway) Vålerenga		16.000
(France) Paris FC		14.000
(England) Manchester United		13.699
(Spain) Atlético Madrid		13.399
(Belgium) OH Leuven		2.200

Notes

1. ^{TH} Champions League title holders (automatic top seed of pot 1)
2. ^{CH} Winners of the third qualifying round (Champions Path)
3. ^{LP} Winners of the third qualifying round (League Path)

== Draw ==
League phase opponents by club
Club	Pot 1 opponents		Pot 2 opponents		Pot 3 opponents		Avg coeff.
Club	Home	Away	Home	Away	Home	Away	Avg coeff.
(England) Arsenal	OL Lyonnes	Bayern Munich	Real Madrid	Benfica	Twente	OH Leuven	45.7
(Spain) Barcelona	Bayern Munich	Chelsea	Benfica	Roma	OH Leuven	Paris FC	41.7
(France) OL Lyonnes	VfL Wolfsburg	Arsenal	St. Pölten	Juventus	Atlético Madrid	Manchester United	36.2
(England) Chelsea	Barcelona	VfL Wolfsburg	Roma	St. Pölten	Paris FC	Twente	47.0
(Germany) Bayern Munich	Arsenal	Barcelona	Juventus	Paris Saint-Germain	Vålerenga	Atlético Madrid	52.7
(Germany) VfL Wolfsburg	Chelsea	OL Lyonnes	Paris Saint-Germain	Real Madrid	Manchester United	Vålerenga	56.4
(France) Paris Saint-Germain	Bayern Munich	VfL Wolfsburg	Real Madrid	Benfica	OH Leuven	Manchester United	39.5
(Spain) Real Madrid	VfL Wolfsburg	Arsenal	Roma	Paris Saint-Germain	Paris FC	Twente	42.5
(Italy) Juventus	OL Lyonnes	Bayern Munich	Benfica	St. Pölten	Manchester United	Atlético Madrid	44.5
(Portugal) Benfica	Arsenal	Barcelona	Paris Saint-Germain	Juventus	Twente	Paris FC	52.8
(Italy) Roma	Barcelona	Chelsea	St. Pölten	Real Madrid	Vålerenga	OH Leuven	50.9
(Austria) St. Pölten	Chelsea	OL Lyonnes	Juventus	Roma	Atlético Madrid	Vålerenga	49.6
(Netherlands) Twente	Chelsea	Arsenal	Real Madrid	Benfica	Atlético Madrid	OH Leuven	39.9
(Norway) Vålerenga	VfL Wolfsburg	Bayern Munich	St. Pölten	Roma	Paris FC	Manchester United	38.6
(France) Paris FC	Barcelona	Chelsea	Benfica	Real Madrid	OH Leuven	Vålerenga	51.9
(England) Manchester United	OL Lyonnes	VfL Wolfsburg	Paris Saint-Germain	Juventus	Vålerenga	Atlético Madrid	51.7
(Spain) Atlético Madrid	Bayern Munich	OL Lyonnes	Juventus	St. Pölten	Manchester United	Twente	45.9
(Belgium) OH Leuven	Arsenal	Barcelona	Roma	Paris Saint-Germain	Twente	Paris FC	51.7

== League phase table ==
The top four ranked teams received a bye directly to the quarter-finals. Teams ranked from 9th to 12th contested the knockout phase play-offs, with teams ranked from 5th to 8th seeded for the draw, while those ranked from 9th to 12th were not. Teams ranked from 13th to 18th were eliminated from all competitions.

Pos	Team	Pld	W	D	L	GF	GA	GD	Pts	Qualification
1	(Royal Spanish Football Federation) Barcelona	6	5	1	0	20	3	+17	16	Advance to the quarter-finals (seeded)
2	(French Football Federation) OL Lyonnes	6	5	1	0	18	5	+13	16	Advance to the quarter-finals (seeded)
3	(The Football Association) Chelsea	6	4	2	0	20	3	+17	14	Advance to the quarter-finals (seeded)
4	(German Football Association) Bayern Munich	6	4	1	1	14	13	+1	13	Advance to the quarter-finals (seeded)
5	(The Football Association) Arsenal	6	4	0	2	11	6	+5	12	Advance to the knockout phase play-offs (seeded)
6	(The Football Association) Manchester United	6	4	0	2	7	9	−2	12	Advance to the knockout phase play-offs (seeded)
7	(Royal Spanish Football Federation) Real Madrid	6	3	2	1	13	7	+6	11	Advance to the knockout phase play-offs (seeded)
8	(Italian Football Federation) Juventus	6	3	1	2	13	8	+5	10	Advance to the knockout phase play-offs (seeded)
9	(German Football Association) VfL Wolfsburg	6	3	0	3	13	10	+3	9	Advance to the knockout phase play-offs (unseeded)
10	(French Football Federation) Paris FC	6	2	2	2	6	9	−3	8	Advance to the knockout phase play-offs (unseeded)
11	(Royal Spanish Football Federation) Atlético Madrid	6	2	1	3	13	9	+4	7	Advance to the knockout phase play-offs (unseeded)
12	(Royal Belgian Football Association) OH Leuven	6	1	3	2	5	10	−5	6	Advance to the knockout phase play-offs (unseeded)
13	(Norwegian Football Federation) Vålerenga	6	1	1	4	4	9	−5	4	
14	(Italian Football Federation) Roma	6	1	1	4	9	19	−10	4	
15	(Royal Dutch Football Association) Twente	6	0	3	3	4	10	−6	3	
16	(Portuguese Football Federation) Benfica	6	0	2	4	4	11	−7	2	
17	(French Football Federation) Paris Saint-Germain	6	0	2	4	4	12	−8	2	
18	(Austrian Football Association) St. Pölten	6	0	1	5	3	28	−25	1	

Source: UEFA
Rules for classification: League phase tiebreakers

== Results summary ==
Matchday 1
Home team	Score	Away team
Juventus (Italy)	2–1	(Portugal) Benfica
Arsenal (England)	1–2	(France) OL Lyonnes
Barcelona (Spain)	7–1	(Germany) Bayern Munich
Paris FC (France)	2–2	(Belgium) OH Leuven
Twente (Netherlands)	1–1	(England) Chelsea
Real Madrid (Spain)	6–2	(Italy) Roma
St. Pölten (Austria)	0–6	(Spain) Atlético Madrid
Manchester United (England)	1–0	(Norway) Vålerenga
VfL Wolfsburg (Germany)	4–0	(France) Paris Saint-Germain

Matchday 2
Home team	Score	Away team
OL Lyonnes (France)	3–0	(Austria) St. Pölten
Vålerenga (Norway)	1–2	(Germany) VfL Wolfsburg
Chelsea (England)	4–0	(France) Paris FC
Roma (Italy)	0–4	(Spain) Barcelona
OH Leuven (Belgium)	2–1	(Netherlands) Twente
Atlético Madrid (Spain)	0–1	(England) Manchester United
Bayern Munich (Germany)	2–1	(Italy) Juventus
Paris Saint-Germain (France)	1–2	(Spain) Real Madrid
Benfica (Portugal)	0–2	(England) Arsenal

Matchday 3
Home team	Score	Away team
Roma (Italy)	0–1	(Norway) Vålerenga
OL Lyonnes (France)	3–1	(Germany) VfL Wolfsburg
Real Madrid (Spain)	1–1	(France) Paris FC
St. Pölten (Austria)	0–6	(England) Chelsea
Barcelona (Spain)	3–0	(Belgium) OH Leuven
Bayern Munich (Germany)	3–2	(England) Arsenal
Benfica (Portugal)	1–1	(Netherlands) Twente
Manchester United (England)	2–1	(France) Paris Saint-Germain
Atlético Madrid (Spain)	1–2	(Italy) Juventus

Matchday 4
Home team	Score	Away team
VfL Wolfsburg (Germany)	5–2	(England) Manchester United
Juventus (Italy)	3–3	(France) OL Lyonnes
Arsenal (England)	2–1	(Spain) Real Madrid
Vålerenga (Norway)	2–2	(Austria) St. Pölten
Paris FC (France)	2–0	(Portugal) Benfica
Twente (Netherlands)	0–4	(Spain) Atlético Madrid
Chelsea (England)	1–1	(Spain) Barcelona
Paris Saint-Germain (France)	1–3	(Germany) Bayern Munich
OH Leuven (Belgium)	1–1	(Italy) Roma

Matchday 5
Home team	Score	Away team
St. Pölten (Austria)	0–5	(Italy) Juventus
Arsenal (England)	1–0	(Netherlands) Twente
Paris Saint-Germain (France)	0–0	(Belgium) OH Leuven
Real Madrid (Spain)	2–0	(Germany) VfL Wolfsburg
Barcelona (Spain)	3–1	(Portugal) Benfica
Vålerenga (Norway)	0–1	(France) Paris FC
Chelsea (England)	6–0	(Italy) Roma
Manchester United (England)	0–3	(France) OL Lyonnes
Atlético Madrid (Spain)	2–2	(Germany) Bayern Munich

Matchday 6
Home team	Score	Away team
OL Lyonnes (France)	4–0	(Spain) Atlético Madrid
Bayern Munich (Germany)	3–0	(Norway) Vålerenga
VfL Wolfsburg (Germany)	1–2	(England) Chelsea
Juventus (Italy)	0–1	(England) Manchester United
Benfica (Portugal)	1–1	(France) Paris Saint-Germain
Roma (Italy)	6–1	(Austria) St. Pölten
Twente (Netherlands)	1–1	(Spain) Real Madrid
Paris FC (France)	0–2	(Spain) Barcelona
OH Leuven (Belgium)	0–3	(England) Arsenal

== Matches ==
Times are CET or CEST, (Note: CEST (UTC+2) for dates up to 25 October 2025 (matchdays 1–2), and CET (UTC+1) for dates thereafter (matchdays 3–6).) as listed by UEFA (local times, if different, are in parentheses).

=== Matchday 1 ===
7 October 2025
18:45

Juventus (Italy)	2–1	(Portugal) Benfica
Salvai 22', 86'	Report	Alves 6'

Juventus Stadium, Turin
Attendance: 4,497
Referee: Ivana Martinčić (Croatia)

7 October 2025
21:00 (20:00 UTC+1)

Arsenal (England)	1–2	(France) OL Lyonnes
Russo 7'	Report	Dumornay 18', 23'

Meadow Park, Borehamwood
Attendance: 3,023
Referee: Maria Sole Ferrieri Caputi (Italy)

7 October 2025
21:00

Barcelona (Spain)	7–1	(Germany) Bayern Munich
Putellas 3'; Pajor 12', 56'; Brugts 27'; Paralluelo 45+1'; Pina 88', 90+2'	Report	Bühl 32'

Johan Cruyff Stadium, Sant Joan Despí
Attendance: 4,409
Referee: Silvia Gasperotti (Italy)

7 October 2025
21:00

Paris FC (France)	2–2	(Belgium) OH Leuven
Corboz 3'; Mateo 23'	Report	Everaerts 47'; Pusztai 62'

Stade Sébastien Charléty, Paris
Attendance: 1,132
Referee: Alina Peşu (Romania)

8 October 2025
18:45

Twente (Netherlands)	1–1	(England) Chelsea
Van Ginkel 63'	Report	Baltimore 71' (pen.)

De Grolsch Veste, Enschede
Attendance: 4,193
Referee: Marta Huerta de Aza (Spain)

8 October 2025
18:45

Real Madrid (Spain)	6–2	(Italy) Roma
Redondo 6', 42'; Weir 23', 59'; Lakrar 53'; Navarro 73'	Report	Viens 16'; Haavi 35'

Alfredo Di Stéfano, Madrid
Attendance: 1,440
Referee: Iuliana Demetrescu (Romania)

8 October 2025
21:00

St. Pölten (Austria)	0–6	(Spain) Atlético Madrid
	Report	Garbelini 5'; Medina 18'; Luany 22'; Bøe Risa 43'; Fiamma 88' (pen.), 90+3'

NV Arena, Sankt Pölten
Attendance: 1,024
Referee: Tess Olofsson (Sweden)

8 October 2025
21:00 (20:00 UTC+1)

Manchester United (England)	1–0	(Norway) Vålerenga
Le Tissier 31' (pen.)	Report

Leigh Sports Village, Leigh
Attendance: 2,204
Referee: Ewa Augustyn (Poland)

8 October 2025
21:00

VfL Wolfsburg (Germany)	4–0	(France) Paris Saint-Germain
Groenen 7' (o.g.); Peddemors 42'; Popp 90'; Minge 90+5' (pen.)	Report

AOK Stadion, Wolfsburg
Attendance: 1,734
Referee: Désirée Grundbacher (Switzerland)

=== Matchday 2 ===
15 October 2025
18:45

OL Lyonnes (France)	3–0	(Austria) St. Pölten
Brand 28'; Hegerberg 45'; Yohannes 52'	Report

Parc Olympique Lyonnais, Décines-Charpieu
Attendance: 3,135
Referee: Emanuela Rusta (Albania)

15 October 2025
18:45

Vålerenga (Norway)	1–2	(Germany) VfL Wolfsburg
Hørte 60'	Report	Beerensteyn 57'; Minge 90+8' (pen.)

Intility Arena, Oslo
Attendance: 3,592
Referee: Marta Huerta de Aza (Spain)

15 October 2025
21:00 (20:00 UTC+1)

Chelsea (England)	4–0	(France) Paris FC
Baltimore 31' (pen.); Rytting Kaneryd 39'; Thompson 47'; Cuthbert 63'	Report

Stamford Bridge, London
Attendance: 2,752
Referee: Michalina Diakow (Poland)

15 October 2025
21:00

Roma (Italy)	0–4	(Spain) Barcelona
	Report	Brugts 2'; Nazareth 58'; Putellas 71' (pen.); Graham Hansen 90'

Stadio Tre Fontane, Rome
Attendance: 2,731
Referee: Ivana Martinčić (Croatia)

15 October 2025
21:00

OH Leuven (Belgium)	2–1	(Netherlands) Twente
Veefkind 82' (pen.); Pusztai 90+6'	Report	Ravensbergen 39'

Den Dreef, Leuven
Attendance: 2,121
Referee: Ivana Projkovska (North Macedonia)

16 October 2025
18:45

Atlético Madrid (Spain)	0–1	(England) Manchester United
	Report	Rolfö 24'

Centro Deportivo Wanda, Alcalá de Henares
Attendance: 1,651
Referee: Eleni Antoniou (Greece)

16 October 2025
21:00

Bayern Munich (Germany)	2–1	(Italy) Juventus
Harder 11'; Schüller 90+4'	Report	Schatzer 17'

FC Bayern Campus, Munich
Attendance: 2,367
Referee: Stéphanie Frappart (France)

16 October 2025
21:00

Paris Saint-Germain (France)	1–2	(Spain) Real Madrid
Ajibade 58'	Report	Feller 29'; Redondo 45+2'

Campus PSG, Paris
Attendance: 478
Referee: Michaela Pachtová (Czech Republic)

16 October 2025
21:00 (20:00 UTC+1)

Benfica (Portugal)	0–2	(England) Arsenal
	Report	Mead 57'; Russo 89'

Estádio da Luz, Lisbon
Attendance: 7,218
Referee: Miriama Bočková (Slovakia)

=== Matchday 3 ===
11 November 2025
18:45

Roma (Italy)	0–1	(Norway) Vålerenga
	Report	Brekken 40'

Stadio Tre Fontane, Rome
Attendance: 1,562
Referee: Michaela Pachtová (Czech Republic)

11 November 2025
21:00

OL Lyonnes (France)	3–1	(Germany) VfL Wolfsburg
Hegerberg 25', 30'; Renard 72' (pen.)	Report	Beerensteyn 80'

Parc Olympique Lyonnais, Décines-Charpieu
Attendance: 4,009
Referee: Eleni Antoniou (Greece)

11 November 2025
21:00

Real Madrid (Spain)	1–1	(France) Paris FC
Weir 90+8'	Report	Azzaro 41' (pen.)

Alfredo Di Stéfano, Madrid
Attendance: 1,179
Referee: Frida Klarlund (Denmark)

11 November 2025
21:00

St. Pölten (Austria)	0–6	(England) Chelsea
	Report	Kaptein 13'; Macario 44', 53' (pen.); Kerr 75', 90+2'; Ebert 86' (o.g.)

NV Arena, Sankt Pölten
Attendance: 2,431
Referee: Franziska Wildfeuer (Germany)

12 November 2025
18:45

Barcelona (Spain)	3–0	(Belgium) OH Leuven
Putellas 45+1' (pen.); Everaerts 56' (o.g.); Paredes 67'	Report

Johan Cruyff Stadium, Sant Joan Despí
Attendance: 3,356
Referee: Riem Hussein (Germany)

12 November 2025
18:45

Bayern Munich (Germany)	3–2	(England) Arsenal
Şehitler 67'; Harder 80'; Viggósdóttir 86'	Report	Fox 5'; Caldentey 23'

Allianz Arena, Munich
Attendance: 15,407
Referee: Marta Huerta de Aza (Spain)

12 November 2025
21:00 (20:00 UTC+0)

Benfica (Portugal)	1–1	(Netherlands) Twente
Martín-Prieto 62'	Report	Groenewegen 69'

Estádio da Luz, Lisbon
Attendance: 2,645
Referee: Stéphanie Frappart (France)

12 November 2025
21:00 (20:00 UTC+0)

Manchester United (England)	2–1	(France) Paris Saint-Germain
Malard 31'; Rolfö 58'	Report	Carmona 45+3'

Old Trafford, Manchester
Attendance: 14,667
Referee: Katalin Kulcsár (Hungary)

12 November 2025
21:00

Atlético Madrid (Spain)	1–2	(Italy) Juventus
Sarriegi 39'	Report	Godø 45+4'; Bonansea 56'

Centro Deportivo Wanda, Alcalá de Henares
Attendance: 1,188
Referee: Ewa Augustyn (Poland)

=== Matchday 4 ===
19 November 2025
18:45

VfL Wolfsburg (Germany)	5–2	(England) Manchester United
Peddemors 17', 37'; Beerensteyn 45', 65'; Endemann 90+6'	Report	Rolfö 14'; Malard 45+2'

Volkswagen Arena, Wolfsburg
Attendance: 3,817
Referee: Miriama Bočková (Slovakia)

19 November 2025
18:45

Juventus (Italy)	3–3	(France) OL Lyonnes
Beccari 12'; Cambiaghi 27'; Pinto 37'	Report	Chawinga 60'; Katoto 79'; Renard 90' (pen.)

Stadio La Marmora-Pozzo, Biella
Attendance: 710
Referee: Olatz Rivera Olmedo (Spain)

19 November 2025
21:00 (20:00 UTC+0)

Arsenal (England)	2–1	(Spain) Real Madrid
Russo 53', 67'	Report	Weir 43'

Meadow Park, Borehamwood
Attendance: 3,132
Referee: Silvia Gasperotti (Italy)

19 November 2025
21:00

Vålerenga (Norway)	2–2	(Austria) St. Pölten
Sævik 11'; Tvedten 19'	Report	Elmore 45'; Klein 56' (pen.)

Intility Arena, Oslo
Attendance: 409
Referee: Michalina Diakow (Poland)

19 November 2025
21:00

Paris FC (France)	2–0	(Portugal) Benfica
Mendy 43'; Garbino 62'	Report

Stade Jean-Bouin, Paris
Attendance: 2,869
Referee: Abigail Byrne (England)

20 November 2025
18:45

Twente (Netherlands)	0–4	(Spain) Atlético Madrid
	Report	Sarriegi 29'; Bartel 41'; Jensen 67'; Fiamma 85'

De Grolsch Veste, Enschede
Attendance: 5,909
Referee: Emanuela Rusta (Albania)

20 November 2025
21:00 (20:00 UTC+0)

Chelsea (England)	1–1	(Spain) Barcelona
Carpenter 16'	Report	Pajor 24'

Stamford Bridge, London
Attendance: 11,137
Referee: Tess Olofsson (Sweden)

20 November 2025
21:00

Paris Saint-Germain (France)	1–3	(Germany) Bayern Munich
Karchaoui 16'	Report	Dallmann 17'; Tanikawa 34'; Damnjanović 89'

Parc des Princes, Paris
Attendance: 13,798
Referee: Alina Peşu (Romania)

20 November 2025
21:00

OH Leuven (Belgium)	1–1	(Italy) Roma
Conijnenberg 71' (pen.)	Report	Viens 18'

Den Dreef, Leuven
Attendance: 4,306
Referee: Hristiyana Guteva (Bulgaria)

=== Matchday 5 ===
9 December 2025
18:45

St. Pölten (Austria)	0–5	(Italy) Juventus
	Report	Vangsgaard 6'; Girelli 43' (pen.), 59' (pen.); Pinto 66'; Krumbiegel 81'

NV Arena, Sankt Pölten
Attendance: 1,023
Referee: Catarina Campos (Portugal)

9 December 2025
21:00 (20:00 UTC+0)

Arsenal (England)	1–0	(Netherlands) Twente
Mead 10'	Report

Meadow Park, Borehamwood
Attendance: 2,300
Referee: Michalina Diakow (Poland)

9 December 2025
21:00

Paris Saint-Germain (France)	0–0	(Belgium) OH Leuven
	Report

Parc des Princes, Paris
Attendance: 3,313
Referee: Olatz Rivera Olmedo (Spain)

9 December 2025
21:00

Real Madrid (Spain)	2–0	(Germany) VfL Wolfsburg
Méndez 19'; Caicedo 67'	Report

Alfredo Di Stéfano, Madrid
Attendance: 1,171
Referee: Kirsty Dowle (England)

10 December 2025
18:45

Barcelona (Spain)	3–1	(Portugal) Benfica
Pajor 29'; Ucheibe 54' (o.g.); Aleixandri 58'	Report	Davidson 46'

Johan Cruyff Stadium, Sant Joan Despí
Attendance: 3,271
Referee: Jana Adámková (Czech Republic)

10 December 2025
18:45

Vålerenga (Norway)	0–1	(France) Paris FC
	Report	Azzaro 82' (pen.)

Intility Arena, Oslo
Attendance: 957
Referee: Fabienne Michel (Germany)

10 December 2025
21:00 (20:00 UTC+0)

Chelsea (England)	6–0	(Italy) Roma
Bergamaschi 13' (o.g.); Kaptein 26'; Rytting Kaneryd 44'; Nüsken 51' (pen.); Hamano 76'; Bronze 86'	Report

Stamford Bridge, London
Attendance: 3,914
Referee: Ewa Augustyn (Poland)

10 December 2025
21:00 (20:00 UTC+0)

Manchester United (England)	0–3	(France) OL Lyonnes
	Report	Chawinga 12'; Dumornay 81', 90'

Leigh Sports Village, Leigh
Attendance: 2,318
Referee: Alina Peşu (Romania)

10 December 2025
21:00

Atlético Madrid (Spain)	2–2	(Germany) Bayern Munich
Bøe Risa 13' (pen.); Fiamma 88'	Report	Harder 63', 78'

Centro Deportivo Wanda, Alcalá de Henares
Attendance: 600
Referee: Maria Sole Ferrieri Caputi (Italy)

=== Matchday 6 ===
17 December 2025
21:00

OL Lyonnes (France)	4–0	(Spain) Atlético Madrid
Bøe Risa 31' (o.g.); Renard 52' (pen.); Diani 53'; Shrader 71'	Report

Parc Olympique Lyonnais, Décines-Charpieu
Attendance: 5,028
Referee: Ivana Projkovska (North Macedonia)

17 December 2025
21:00

Bayern Munich (Germany)	3–0	(Norway) Vålerenga
Tanikawa 2'; Ballisager 11'; Harder 58'	Report

FC Bayern Campus, Munich
Attendance: 2,120
Referee: Désirée Grundbacher (Switzerland)

17 December 2025
21:00

VfL Wolfsburg (Germany)	1–2	(England) Chelsea
Popp 16'	Report	Bronze 45'; Kerr 64'

AOK Stadion, Wolfsburg
Attendance: 2,627
Referee: Silvia Gasperotti (Italy)

17 December 2025
21:00

Juventus (Italy)	0–1	(England) Manchester United
	Report	Park 18'

Juventus Stadium, Turin
Attendance: 6,641
Referee: Marta Huerta de Aza (Spain)

17 December 2025
21:00 (20:00 UTC+0)

Benfica (Portugal)	1–1	(France) Paris Saint-Germain
Costa 32' (pen.)	Report	Echegini 5'

Estádio da Luz, Lisbon
Attendance: 2,819
Referee: Hristiyana Guteva (Bulgaria)

17 December 2025
21:00

Roma (Italy)	6–1	(Austria) St. Pölten
Pilgrim 19'; Viens 33', 60', 67'; Dragoni 76'; Corelli 84'	Report	Aistleitner 88'

Stadio Tre Fontane, Rome
Attendance: 1,214
Referee: Frida Klarlund (Denmark)

17 December 2025
21:00

Twente (Netherlands)	1–1	(Spain) Real Madrid
Ravensbergen 46'	Report	Däbritz 90+5'

De Grolsch Veste, Enschede
Attendance: 3,650
Referee: Lotta Vuorio (Finland)

17 December 2025
21:00

Paris FC (France)	0–2	(Spain) Barcelona
	Report	López 22'; Graham Hansen 49'

Stade Jean-Bouin, Paris
Attendance: 15,207
Referee: Iuliana Demetrescu (Romania)

17 December 2025
21:00

OH Leuven (Belgium)	0–3	(England) Arsenal
	Report	Smith 18'; Mead 27'; Janssen 68' (o.g.)

Den Dreef, Leuven
Attendance: 9,285
Referee: Rasa Grigonė (Lithuania)
