= Albania women's national football team results =

This is a list of the Albania women's national football team results from its formation in 2011 to the present day.

== 2011 ==
5 May 2011 Friendly	Albania	1–0	North Macedonia	Gjorgji Kyçyku Stadium, Pogradec
	Seranaj 30'	Report		Attendance: 2,000

10 November 2011 Friendly	North Macedonia	1–4	Albania	Gradska Plaža Stadium, Struga

== 2012 ==
15 May 2012 Friendly	Montenegro	2–4	Albania	Stadion Topolica, Bar

18 May 2012 Friendly	Albania	4–3	Montenegro	Loro Boriçi Stadium, Shkodër

22 May 2012 Friendly	Albania	2–0	North Macedonia	Gjorgji Kyçyku Stadium, Pogradec

== 2013 ==
4 April 2013 2015 World Cup qualifier	Albania	1–1	Malta	Ta' Qali National Stadium, Ta' Qali
16:00	Curo 76'	Report	Theuma 80'	Attendance: 120; Referee: Petra Chudá (Slovakia)

6 April 2013 2015 World Cup qualifier	Albania	2–0	Latvia	Ta' Qali National Stadium, Ta' Qali
11:00	Memedov 17'; Velaj 41'	Report		Attendance: 40; Referee: Yuliya Medvedeva-Keldyusheva (Kazakhstan)

9 April 2013 2015 World Cup qualifier	Luxembourg	1–2	Albania	Ta' Qali National Stadium, Ta' Qali
16:00	Maurer 45'	Report	Jashari 16'; Velaj 69'	Attendance: 40; Referee: Petra Chudá (Slovakia)

29 May 2013 Friendly	Albania	3–4	North Macedonia	Gjorgji Kyçyku Stadium, Pogradec

21 September 2013 2015 World Cup qualifier	Belgium	2–0	Albania	King Baudouin Stadium, Brussels
19:00	Philtjens 17'; Zeler 53' (pen.)	Report		Attendance: 1,526; Referee: Linn Andersson (Sweden)

26 September 2013 2015 World Cup qualifier	Albania	0–4	Netherlands	Qemal Stafa Stadium, Tirana
17:00		Report	Melis 4', 8', 53'; Slegers 90+1'	Attendance: 1,100; Referee: Rhona Daly (Ireland)

26 October 2013 2015 World Cup qualifier	Norway	7–0	Albania	Sarpsborg Stadion, Sarpsborg
16:00	Christensen 12'; Thorsnes 29'; Mjelde 45+2'; Hansen 51', 70', 73'; Gulbrandsen 62'	Report		Attendance: 1,528; Referee: Riem Hussein (Germany)

30 October 2013 2015 World Cup qualifier	Albania	1–0	Greece	Qemal Stafa Stadium, Tirana
14:30	Velaj 52'	Report		Attendance: 1,000; Referee: Aneliya Sinabova (Bulgaria)

== 2014 ==
12 February 2014 2015 World Cup qualifier	Portugal	7–1	Albania	Estádio Municipal de Abrantes, Abrantes
20:30	Mendes 19', 45+2', 69'; Rodrigues 27', 90+2'; Silva 61'; Garcia 88'	Report	Serenaj 49'	Attendance: 1,129; Referee: Kristina Husballe (Denmark)

5 April 2014 2015 World Cup qualifier	Albania	0–6	Belgium	Niko Dovana Stadium, Durrës
16:00		Report	van de Putte 11'; Wullaert 54'; Mermans 65'; Zeler 74', 84', 87'	Attendance: 300; Referee: Lilach Asulin (Israel)

10 April 2014 2015 World Cup qualifier	Netherlands	10–1	Albania	Stadion De Braak, Helmond
19:00	van den Heiligenberg 4'; Slegers 28', 31', 32', 79', 90+3'; Gjini 45+4' (o.g.); Martens 78', 82'; Bakker 90+1'	Report	Rrahmani 45+4'	Attendance: 3,518; Referee: Yuliya Medvedeva-Keldyusheva (Kazakhstan)

14 June 2014 2015 World Cup qualifier	Albania	0–3	Portugal	Loni Papuçiu Stadium, Fier
18:00		Report	Mendes 54'; Malho 63'; Pereira 66'	Attendance: 100; Referee: Florence Guillemin (France)

13 September 2014 2015 World Cup qualifier	Albania	0–11	Norway	Niko Dovana Stadium, Durrës
13:00		Report	Herlovsen 18', 45+2', 82'; Mjelde 34', 66'; Hansen 40', 89'; Hegerberg 60', 63'; Haavi 85'; Enget 90+1'	Attendance: 200; Referee: Morag Pirie (Scotland)

17 September 2014 2015 World Cup qualifier	Greece	4–0	Albania	Veria Stadium, Veria
16:30	Franja 2' (o.g.); Kokoviadou 31'; Kongouli 74'; Panteliadou 90+2'	Report		Attendance: 312; Referee: Sabine Bonnin (France)

== 2015 ==
24 March 2015 Friendly	Luxembourg	1–2	Albania	Stade Jean Donnersbach, Lintgen
18:00

25 June 2015 Friendly	Montenegro	1–0	Albania	Stadion pod Malim brdom, Petrovac
18:00

19 August 2015 Friendly	Albania	1–0	Turkey	Loni Papuçiu Stadium, Fier
17:00

21 August 2015 Friendly	Albania	0–1	Turkey	Loni Papuçiu Stadium, Fier
17:00

31 August 2015 Friendly	Croatia	7–1	Albania	Stadion Gradski, Belišće
17:00

2 September 2015 Friendly	Croatia	3–1	Albania	U Donjem Gradu, Osijek
17:00

22 October 2015 2017 Euro qualifier	Albania	1–4	Greece	Loni Papuçiu Stadium, Fier
14:00	Kurbogaj 23'	Report	Zani 14' (o.g.); Kydonaki 27'; Sidira 37'; Markou 90+2'	Attendance: 1,000; Referee: Zuzana Štrpková (Slovakia)

27 October 2015 2017 Euro qualifier	Romania	3–0	Albania	Stadionul Mogoșoaia, Mogoșoaia
15:00	Lunca 9'; Corduneanu 24'; Giurgiu 74'	Report		Attendance: 100; Referee: Ana Minić (Serbia)

27 November 2015 2017 Euro qualifier	Albania	1–4	France	Qemal Stafa Stadium, Tirana
21:00		Report	Houara 12', 15'; Le Sommer 25', 81'; Le Bihan 63', 73'	Attendance: 350; Referee: Vera Opeykina (Russia)

== 2016 ==
26 January 2016 2017 Euro qualifier	Greece	3–2	Albania	Trikala Municipal Stadium, Trikala
13:00	Sidira 6' (pen.); Koggouli 10'; Panteliadou 15'	Report	Velaj 26'; Hashani 41'	Attendance: 2,031; Referee: Virginie Derouaux (Belgium)

4 March 2016 2017 Euro qualifier	Albania	0–4	Ukraine	Elbasan Arena, Elbasan
14:30		Report	Apanaschenko 14' (pen.); Kozyrenko 30'; Bajraktari 67' (o.g.); Kravets 84'	Attendance: 100; Referee: Elia Martínez (Spain)

8 April 2016 2017 Euro qualifier	Ukraine	2–0	Albania	Arena Lviv, Lviv
17:00	Apanaschenko 15', 74' (pen.)	Report		Attendance: 2,484; Referee: Tanja Subotič (Slovenia)

26 April 2016 Friendly	Hungary	6–0	Albania	Ménfői út, Győr
13:30	Vágó 5' (pen.), 16' (pen.), 26', 43'; Rácz 53'; Kaján 77'

2 June 2016 2017 Euro qualifier	Albania	0–3	Romania	Elbasan Arena, Elbasan
17:00		Report	Vătafu 43', 67', 77'	Attendance: 150; Referee: Lois Otte (Belgium)

20 September 2016 2017 Euro qualifier	France	6–0	Albania	Stade Jean-Bouin, Paris
21:00	Le Bihan 18'; Hamraoui 21', 60'; Le Sommer 45+1', 64' (pen.); Delie 77'	Report		Attendance: 7,521; Referee: Elvira Nurmustafina (Kazakhstan)

== 2017 ==
6 April 2017 2019 World Cup qualifier	Albania	3–2	Kosovo	Elbasan Arena, Elbasan
12:00	Bajraktari 17'; Velaj 75'; Musa 90+6' (o.g.)	Report	Rexha 35', 59'	Attendance: 1,500; Referee: Lorraine Clark (Scotland)

8 April 2017 2019 World Cup qualifier	Malta	0–0	Albania	Elbasan Arena, Elbasan
14:00		Report		Attendance: 300; Referee: Lorraine Clark (Scotland)

11 April 2017 2019 World Cup qualifier	Albania	2–1	Greece	Elbasan Arena, Elbasan
14:00	Doci 16'; Velaj 90'	Report	Nati 18'	Attendance: 4,000; Referee: Lina Lehtovaara (Finland)

15 September 2017 2019 World Cup qualifier	Albania	1–4	Switzerland	Elbasan Arena, Elbasan
17:00	Begolli 81'	Report	Brunner 23'; Bachmann 39'; Crnogorčević 41' (pen.); Dickenmann 67'	Attendance: 200; Referee: Amy Rayner (England)

19 September 2017 2019 World Cup qualifier	Belarus	1–0	Albania	FC Minsk Stadium, Minsk
17:00	Shuppo 48'	Report		Attendance: 350; Referee: Paula Brady (Republic of Ireland)

24 October 2017 2019 World Cup qualifier	Scotland	5–0	Albania	St Mirren Park, Paisley
20:30	Begolli 21' (o.g.); Brown 33'; Ross 54'; Emslie 56'; Evans 82'	Report		Attendance: 1,845; Referee: Dimitrina Milkova (Bulgaria)

24 November 2017 2019 World Cup qualifier	Albania	1–4	Poland	Loro Boriçi Stadium, Shkodër
17:00	Doci 78'	Report	Sikora 5'; Guściora 13'; Winczo 37', 66'	Attendance: 800; Referee: Iuliana Demetrescu (Romania)

28 November 2017 2019 World Cup qualifier	Switzerland	5–1	Albania	Tissot Arena, Biel/Bienne
19:00	Ismaili 8', 87'; Bachmann 35'; Kiwic 73'; Calligaris 80'	Report	Krasniqi 29'	Attendance: 1,215; Referee: Petra Pavlikova (Slovakia)

== 2018 ==
6 April 2018 2019 World Cup qualifier	Poland	1–1	Albania	Osrodek Sportu i Rekreacji, Włocławek
17:30	Daleszczyk 2'	Report	Morina 74'	Attendance: 1,925; Referee: María Dolores Martinez Madrona (Spain)

10 April 2018 2019 World Cup qualifier	Albania	1–0	Belarus	Elbasan Arena, Elbasan
16:00	Gjini 88'	Report		Attendance: 700; Referee: Ifeoma Kulmala (Finland)

4 September 2018 2019 World Cup qualifier	Albania	1–2	Scotland	Loro Boriçi Stadium, Shkodër
17:00	Doci 45'	Report	Little 9'; Ross 68'	Attendance: 700; Referee: Barbara Poxhofer (Austria)

8 November 2018 Friendly	Slovenia	2–0	Albania	Stadion Gornja Radgona, Gornja Radgona
13:00	Zver 4', 69' (pen.)	Report		Attendance: 200; Referee: Aleksandra Česen (Slovenia)

== 2019 ==
4 April 2019 Friendly	Bosnia and Herzegovina	1–0	Albania	FF BH Football Training Centre, Zenica
15:00	Aleksić 63'	Report		Referee: Merima Čelik (Bosnia and Herzegovina)

2 September 2019 Euro 2022 qualifying	Albania	0–3	Finland	Elbasan Arena, Elbasan
17:00 UTC+2		Report	Sällström 10', 38'; Kollanen 26'	Attendance: 1,046; Referee: Ruzanna Petrosyan (Armenia)

4 October 2019 Euro 2022 qualifying	Albania	0–1	Portugal	Elbasan Arena, Elbasan
18:00 UTC+2		Report	J. Silva 16'	Attendance: 1,000; Referee: Ruzanna Petrosyan (Armenia)

== 2023 ==
7 April 2023 Friendly	Albania	3–1	North Macedonia	Elbasan, Albania
--:-- UTC+1				Stadium: Elbasan Arena

22 September 2023–24 UEFA Nations League	Albania	1–1	Hungary	Shkodër
17:00	Krasniqi 27'	Report	Fenyvesi 74'	Stadium: Loro Boriçi Stadium, Referee: Veronika Kovarova (Czech Republic)

26 September UEFA Women's Nations League	Northern Ireland	1–0	Albania	Belfast, Northern Ireland
--:--	Wade 57'	Source		Stadium: Seaview Stadium; Referee: Zulema González (Spain)

27 October 2023–24 UEFA Nations League	Republic of Ireland	5–1	Albania	Dublin
	McCabe 4', 26', 81'; Carusa 56}', 59'	Report	Doçi 7'	Stadium: Tallaght Stadium; Referee: Lizzy Van Der Helm (Netherlands)

31 October 2023–24 UEFA Nations League	Albania	0–1	Republic of Ireland	Shkodër, Albania
18:00		Report	O'Sullivan 88'	Stadium: Loro Boriçi Stadium; Referee: Araksya Saribekyan (Armenia)

1 December 2023 2023–24 UEFA Nations League	Albania	0–4	Northern Ireland	Tirana
17:00		Report	Magill 43', 47'; Maxwell 58'; Bell 85'	Stadium: Arena Kombëtare; Attendance: 600; Referee: Minka Vekkeli (Finland)

5 December 2023 2023–24 UEFA Nations League	Hungary	6–0	Albania	Budapest
19:00		Report		Stadium: Hidegkuti Nándor Stadion; Referee: Karoline Wacker (Germany)

== 2024 ==
22 February Visit Malta Women's Tournament 2024	Albania	0–3	Belarus	Paola, Malta
		Report	Maliqi 35' (o.g); Pilipienka 62', 85'	Stadium: Tony Bezzina Stadium

25 February Visit Malta Women's Tournament 2024	Albania	3–0	Faroe Islands	Paola, Malta
	Berisha 9'; Istrefaj 60'; Tukaj 65'	Report		Stadium: Tony Bezzina Stadium

5 April UEFA Women's Euro 2025 qualifying	Luxembourg	2–1	Albania	Esch-sur-Alzette, Luxembourg
--:-- UTC+0	C. Schmit 68'; Thompson 87'	Report	Gjini 43'	Stadium: Stade Emile Mayrisch; Referee: Marina Zechner (Austria)

9 April UEFA Women's Euro 2025 qualifying	Albania	2–0	Estonia	Tirana
--:-- UTC+0		Report		Stadium: Arena Kombëtare; Referee: Anastasiya Romanyuk (Ukraine)

31 May UEFA Women's Euro 2025 qualifying	Estonia	1–2	Albania	Tallinn
17:00 (18:00 UTC+3)	Himanen 17'	Report	F. Berisha 7'; Krasniqi 90+2'	Stadium: Lilleküla Stadium; Attendance: 934; Referee: Tatyana Sorokopudova (Kazakhstan)

4 June UEFA Women's Euro 2025 qualifying	Albania	3–1	Luxembourg	Elbasan, Albania
--:-- UTC+0	Doçi 29' (pen.); Krasniqi 45+2'; Berisha 46'	Report	Kremer 90+1'	Stadium: Elbasan Arena; Referee: Melek Dakan (Turkey)

25 October UEFA Women's Euro 2025 qualifying play-offs	Albania	0–5	Norway	Shkodër, Albania
16:00 UTC+2		Report	Maanum 9'; Bergsvand 23', 44'; Hegerberg 62'; Hoxhaj 74' (o.g.)	Stadium: Loro Boriçi Stadium; Attendance: 2,185; Referee: Ana Maria Terteleac (Romania)

29 October UEFA Women's Euro 2025 qualifying play-offs	Norway	9–0	Albania	Oslo, Norway
19:00 UTC+2	Maanum 18', 52', 62', 65'; Naalsund 29'; Hegerberg 44'; Gaupset 75'; Reiten 81' (pen.); Bøe Risa 90+1'	Report		Stadium: Ullevaal Stadion

3 December Friendly	Romania	1–2	Albania	Târgoviște, Romania
18:00	Carp 43'		Troka 10'; Dogi 90+2'	Stadium: Eugen Popescu Stadium

== 2025 ==
21 February 2025 UEFA Nations League	Albania	1–2	Ukraine	Durrës, Albania
18:00 UTC+1	Berisha 90+5'	Report	Ovdiychuk 31'; Kozlova 48'	Stadium: Niko Dovana Stadium; Attendance: 2,520; Referee: Franziska Wildfeuer (Germany)

25 February 2025 Nations League B	Czech Republic	5–1	Albania	České Budějovice, Czech Republic
17:30	Svitková 34', 42'; Bartoňová 45+2', 62'; Stašková 60'	Report	Doçi 24' (pen.)	Stadium: Strelecky Ostrov; Attendance: 2,025; Referee: Kristina Georgieva (Bulgaria)

4 April 2025 Nations League B	Albania	4–0	Croatia	Shkodër, Albania
16:00	Berisha 14'; Hila 24'; Doçi 72'; Hamonikaj 90+1'	Report		Stadium: Loro Boriçi Stadium; Attendance: 436; Referee: Alexandra Collin (France)

8 April 2025 Nations League B	Croatia	1–2	Albania	Zagreb, Croatia
16:00	Slipčević 11'	Report	Berisha 32'; Balog 71' (o.g.)	Stadium: Sport Centre Rudes; Attendance: 377; Referee: Maria Marotta (Italy)

30 May 2025 UEFA Nations League	Ukraine	2–1	Albania	Varaždin, Croatia
19:00 UTC+2	Ovdiychuk 19'; Basanska 41'	Report	Berisha 10'	Stadium: Stadion Varteks; Attendance: 50; Referee: Caroline Lanssens (Belgium)

3 June 2025 Nations League B	Albania	1–2	Czech Republic	Shkodër, Albania
19:00	Berisha 45+2'	Report	Bartoňová 87' (pen.); Khýrová 90'	Stadium: Loro Boriçi Stadium; Attendance: 483; Referee: Michalina Diakow (Poland)

24 October 2025 UEFA Nations League play-off	Cyprus	3–2	Albania	Larnaca, Cyprus
18:00 (19:00 EEST)	Panagiotou 43'; Violari 45+1', 83'	Report	Doçi 29', 33'	Stadium: Antonis Papadopoulos Stadium; Attendance: 350; Referee: Miriama Bočková (Slovakia)

28 October 2025 UEFA Nations League play-off	Albania	3–0	Cyprus	Tirana, Albania
18:00	Krasniqi 16'; Begallo 38'; Doçi 67' (pen.)	Report		Stadium: Arena Kombëtare; Attendance: 678; Referee: Catarina Campos (Portugal)
Note: Albania won 5–3 on aggregate, and therefore both teams remained in their respective leagues

28 November Friendly	Albania	1-1	Turkey	Antalya, Turkey
	Topçu 50'		Hilaj 20'

1 December 2025 Friendly	Turkey	2–0	Albania	Istanbul, Turkey
19:00	Şeker 14'; Altunkulak 81'			Stadium: THY Fielad; Referee: Lutfaliyeva (AZE), Nuriyeva(AZE), Akbarzada (AZE)

== 2026 ==
3 March 2027 FIFA Women's World Cup qualification	Montenegro	1–2	Albania	Nikšić, Montenegro
14:00	Kuč 67'	Report (FIFA); Report (UEFA)	Doçi 70', 76'	Stadium: Gradski stadion Referee: Miriama Bočková (Slovakia)

7 March 2027 FIFA Women's World Cup qualification	Albania	1–5	Czech Republic	Shkodër, Albania
18:00	F. Berisha 18'	Report (FIFA); Report (UEFA)	Cvrčková 14', 68'; Khýrová 37', 62'; Černá 50'	Stadium: Loro Boriçi Stadium; Attendance: 743; Referee: Lotta Vuorio (Finland)

14 April 2027 FIFA Women's World Cup qualification	Wales	4–0	Albania	Wrexham, Wales
20:15	Cain 15', 55'; E. Hughes 35'; Roberts 48'	Report (FIFA); Report (UEFA)		Stadium: Racecourse Ground; Attendance: 4,485; Referee: Katalin Sipos (Hungary)

== Record against other nations ==
As of 17 April 2026

Opponent	Games	Wins	Draws	Losses	Goals For	Goals Against	Goal Differential
Belarus	3	1	0	2	1	4	−3
Bosnia and Herzegovina	1	0	0	1	0	1	−1
Belgium	2	0	0	2	0	8	−8
Croatia	4	2	0	2	8	11	−3
Cyprus	2	1	0	1	5	3	+2
Czech Republic	3	0	0	3	3	12	−9
Estonia	2	2	0	0	4	1	+3
Faroe Islands	1	1	0	0	3	0	+3
Finland	1	0	0	1	0	3	−3
France	2	0	0	2	0	12	−12
Greece	5	2	0	3	6	12	−6
Hungary	3	0	1	2	1	13	–12
Kosovo	1	1	0	0	3	2	+1
Latvia	1	1	0	0	2	0	+2
Luxembourg	4	3	0	1	8	5	+3
North Macedonia	5	4	0	1	13	6	+7
Malta	2	0	2	0	1	1	0
Montenegro	4	2	0	2	9	8	+1
Netherlands	2	0	0	2	1	14	−13
Northern Ireland	2	0	0	2	0	5	−5
Norway	4	0	0	4	0	32	−32
Poland	2	0	1	1	2	5	−3
Portugal	3	0	0	3	1	11	−10
Republic of Ireland	2	0	0	2	1	5	−4
Romania	3	1	0	2	2	7	−5
Scotland	2	0	0	2	1	7	−6
Slovenia	1	0	0	1	0	2	−2
Switzerland	2	0	0	2	2	9	−7
Turkey	4	1	1	2	2	4	−2
Ukraine	4	0	0	4	2	10	–8
Wales	1	0	0	1	0	4	−4
31 Countries	78	22	5	51	81	217	−136
