= 2015 FIFA Women's World Cup qualification – UEFA Group 5 =

Football tournament qualification stage

The 2015 FIFA Women's World Cup qualification UEFA Group 5 was a UEFA qualifying group for the 2015 FIFA Women's World Cup. The group comprised Albania, Belgium, Greece, Netherlands, Norway and Portugal.

The group winners qualified directly for the 2015 FIFA Women's World Cup. Among the seven group runners-up, the four best (determined by records against the first-, third-, fourth- and fifth-placed teams only for balance between different groups) advanced to the play-offs. The winner of the group was Norway, with Netherlands proceeding to the play-offs.

== Standings ==
Pos	Team	Pld	W	D	L	GF	GA	GD	Pts	Qualification	Norway	Netherlands	Belgium	Portugal	Greece	Albania
1	Norway	10	9	0	1	41	5	+36	27	Women's World Cup	—	0–2	4–1	2–0	6–0	7–0
2	Netherlands	10	8	1	1	43	6	+37	25	Play-offs	1–2	—	1–1	3–2	7–0	10–1
3	Belgium	10	6	1	3	34	11	+23	19		1–2	0–2	—	4–1	11–0	2–0
4	Portugal	10	4	0	6	19	21	−2	12		0–2	0–7	0–1	—	1–0	7–1
5	Greece	10	1	0	9	6	49	−43	3 (Note: Greece scored more head-to-head goals than Albania)		0–5	0–6	1–7	1–5	—	4–0
6	Albania	10	1	0	9	3	54	−51	3		0–11	0–4	0–6	0–3	1–0	—

Source: UEFA
Rules for classification: Tiebreakers

== Results ==
All times are CEST (UTC+02:00) during summer and CET (UTC+01:00) during winter.

21 September 2013
19:00

Belgium	2–0	Albania
Philtjens 17'; Zeler 53' (pen.)	Report

King Baudouin Stadium, Brussels
Attendance: 1,526
Referee: Linn Andersson (Sweden)

25 September 2013
18:00

Norway	4–1	Belgium
Hansen 5'; Hegland 35', 54', 66'	Report	de Gernier 62'

Ullevaal Stadion, Oslo
Attendance: 4,233
Referee: Silvia Spinelli (Italy)
26 September 2013
16:30

Greece	1–5	Portugal
Pelekouda 74'	Report	Luís 6', 42'; Xera 68' (o.g.); Fernandes 80'; Silva 90+2'

Fyli Municipal Stadium, Fyli
Attendance: 108
Referee: Lina Lehtovaara (Finland)
26 September 2013
17:00

Albania	0–4	Netherlands
	Report	Melis 4', 8', 53'; Slegers 90+1'

Qemal Stafa Stadium, Tirana
Attendance: 1,100
Referee: Rhona Daly (Ireland)

26 October 2013
15:30

Greece	1–7	Belgium
Kongouli 42'	Report	Zeler 15', 27', 45+1' (pen.); Wullaert 58', 75'; Coutereels 61' (pen.) van de Putte 74'

Levadia Municipal Stadium, Livadia
Attendance: 578
Referee: Elia Martinez (Spain)
26 October 2013
16:00

Norway	7–0	Albania
Christensen 12'; Thorsnes 29'; Mjelde 45+2'; Hansen 51', 70', 73'; Gulbrandsen 62'	Report

Sarpsborg Stadion, Sarpsborg
Attendance: 1,528
Referee: Riem Hussein (Germany)
26 October 2013
17:00

Portugal	0–7	Netherlands
	Report	Slegers 2', 35'; Dekker 55' van den Berg 63'; Miedema 78', 81', 90+4'

Estádio José de Carvalho, Maia
Attendance: 1,108
Referee: Séverine Zinck (France)

30 October 2013
14:30

Albania	1–0	Greece
Velaj 52'	Report

Niko Dovana Stadium, Durrës
Attendance: 1,000
Referee: Aneliya Sinabova (Bulgaria)
30 October 2013
19:00

Netherlands	1–2	Norway
Miedema 23'	Report	Hansen 18'; Stensland 37'

Kras Stadion, Volendam
Attendance: 3,500
Referee: Gyöngyi Gaál (Hungary)
31 October 2013
20:30

Belgium	4–1	Portugal
Zeler 41' (pen.), 85'; Wullaert 67', 87'	Report	Costa 14'

Olympisch Stadion, Antwerp
Attendance: 1,141
Referee: Floarea Ionescu (Romania)

23 November 2013
19:00

Netherlands	7–0	Greece
Martens 9', 60'; Miedema 23', 29', 64'; Melis 37' (pen.) van den Berg 90'	Report

Stadion Woudestein, Rotterdam
Attendance: 3,040
Referee: Simona Ghisletta (Switzerland)

12 February 2014
19:00

Netherlands	1–1	Belgium
Miedema 48'	Report	Zeler 76'

MAC³PARK Stadion, Zwolle
Attendance: 7,296
Referee: Kateryna Monzul (Ukraine)
12 February 2014
20:30

Portugal	7–1	Albania
Mendes 19', 45+2', 69'; Rodrigues 27', 90+2'; Silva 61'; Garcia 88'	Report	Serenaj 49'

Estádio Municipal de Abrantes, Abrantes
Attendance: 1,129
Referee: Kristina Husballe (Denmark)
13 February 2014
14:00

Greece	0–5	Norway
	Report	Hegland 45+1'; Thorsnes 60', 75'; Hegerberg 66'; Bjånesøy 89'

Komotini Municipal Stadium, Komotini
Attendance: 917
Referee: Vesna Budimir (Croatia)

5 April 2014
16:00

Albania	0–6	Belgium
	Report	van de Putte 11'; Wullaert 54'; Mermans 65'; Zeler 74', 84', 87'

Niko Dovana Stadium, Durrës
Attendance: 300
Referee: Lilach Asulin (Israel)
5 April 2014
16:30

Greece	0–6	Netherlands
	Report	Melis 7'; Middag 32'; Miedema 40' van den Berg 47'; Spitse 65'; Bakker 90'

Pankritio Stadium, Heraklion
Attendance: 792
Referee: Petra Chudá (Slovakia)

9 April 2014
16:00

Portugal	1–0	Greece
Neto 78'	Report

Dr. Marques Dos Santos, Sertã
Attendance: 1,827
Referee: Anastasia Pustovoitova (Russia)
10 April 2014
19:00

Netherlands	10–1	Albania
van den Heiligenberg 4'; Slegers 28', 31', 32', 79', 90+3'; Gjini 45+4' (o.g.); Martens 78', 82'; Bakker 90+1'	Report	Rrahmani 45+4'

Stadion De Braak, Helmond
Attendance: 3,518
Referee: Yuliya Medvedeva-Keldyusheva (Kazakhstan)
10 April 2014
20:00

Belgium	1–2	Norway
Zeler 86'	Report	Stensland 45'; Hegerberg 51'

Den Dreef, Leuven
Attendance: 1,722
Referee: Bibiana Steinhaus (Germany)

7 May 2014
18:00

Norway	2–0	Portugal
Thorsnes 47'; Herlovsen 89'	Report

Tønsberg Gressbane, Tønsberg
Attendance: 2,117
Referee: Monika Mularczyk (Poland)
7 May 2014
20:00

Belgium	0–2	Netherlands
	Report	Miedema 9'; Slegers 19'

Den Dreef, Leuven
Attendance: 2,646
Referee: Katalin Kulcsár (Hungary)

14 June 2014
16:00

Norway	6–0	Greece
Hegerberg 3'; Hansen 25'; Mjelde 27'; Berge 32'; Herlovsen 43'; Haavi 58'	Report

Brann Stadion, Bergen
Attendance: 3,412
Referee: Esther Staubli (Switzerland)
14 June 2014
18:00

Albania	0–3	Portugal
	Report	Mendes 54'; Malho 63'; Pereira 66'

Loni Papuçiu Stadium, Fier
Attendance: 100
Referee: Florence Guillemin (France)

18 June 2014
19:30

Portugal	0–2	Norway
	Report	Herlovsen 25'; Mjelde 34'

Estádio Marcolino de Castro, Santa Maria da Feira
Attendance: 2,133
Referee: Amy Rayner (England)

13 September 2014
13:00

Albania	0–11	Norway
	Report	Herlovsen 18', 45+2', 82'; Mjelde 34', 66'; Hansen 40', 89'; Hegerberg 60', 63'; Haavi 85'; Enget 90+1'

Niko Dovana Stadium, Durrës
Attendance: 200
Referee: Morag Pirie (Scotland)
13 September 2014
16:00

Belgium	11–0	Greece
De Caigny 16', 71'; Zeler 34'; Mermans 40', 50'; Wullaert 46', 54', 69', 82'; Cayman 68'; Van Gorp 73'	Report

Den Dreef, Heverlee
Attendance: 1,527
Referee: Yuliya Medvedeva-Keldyusheva (Kazakhstan)
13 September 2014
19:00

Netherlands	3–2	Portugal
Miedema 28', 54', 68'	Report	Silva 52'; Luís 61'

De Koel, Venlo
Attendance: 1,910
Referee: Jana Adámková (Czech Republic)

17 September 2014
16:30

Greece	4–0	Albania
Franja 2' (o.g.); Kokoviadou 31'; Kongouli 74'; Panteliadou 90+2'	Report

Veria Stadium, Veria
Attendance: 312
Referee: Sabine Bonnin (France)
17 September 2014
18:00

Norway	0–2	Netherlands
	Report	Dekker 68'; Van de Donk 76'

Nadderud Stadion, Bekkestua
Attendance: 1,512
Referee: Cristina Dorcioman (Romania)
17 September 2014
19:30

Portugal	0–1	Belgium
	Report	Wullaert 18'

Estádio Municipal de Abrantes, Abrantes
Attendance: 630
Referee: Sara Persson (Sweden)

== Goalscorers ==
13 goals

- (Netherlands) Vivianne Miedema

12 goals

- (Belgium) Aline Zeler

10 goals

- (Belgium) Tessa Wullaert

9 goals

- (Netherlands) Renée Slegers

8 goals

- (Norway) Caroline Graham Hansen

6 goals

- (Norway) Isabell Herlovsen

5 goals

- (Netherlands) Manon Melis
- (Norway) Ada Hegerberg
- (Norway) Maren Mjelde

4 goals

- (Netherlands) Lieke Martens
- (Norway) Kristine Wigdahl Hegland
- (Norway) Elise Thorsnes

3 goals

- (Belgium) Lien Mermans
- (Netherlands) Mandy van den Berg
- (Portugal) Laura Luís
- (Portugal) Carolina Mendes
- (Portugal) Jéssica Silva

2 goals

- (Belgium) Tinne De Caigny
- (Belgium) Lorca Van De Putte
- (Greece) Sophia Koggouli
- (Netherlands) Eshly Bakker
- (Netherlands) Anouk Dekker
- (Norway) Emilie Haavi
- (Norway) Ingvild Stensland
- (Portugal) Vanessa Rodrigues

1 goal

- (Albania) Albina Rrahmani
- (Albania) Aurora Serenaj
- (Albania) Furtuna Velaj
- (Belgium) Janice Cayman
- (Belgium) Maud Coutereels
- (Belgium) Cécile de Gernier
- (Belgium) Davina Philtjens
- (Belgium) Elke Van Gorp
- (Greece) Sofia Pelekouda
- (Greece) Christina Kokoviadou
- (Greece) Dimitra Panteliadou
- (Netherlands) Tessel Middag
- (Netherlands) Sherida Spitse
- (Netherlands) Daniëlle van de Donk
- (Netherlands) Claudia van den Heiligenberg
- (Norway) Nora Holstad Berge
- (Norway) Melissa Bjånesøy
- (Norway) Marit Fiane Christensen
- (Norway) Ida Elise Enget
- (Norway) Solveig Gulbrandsen
- (Portugal) Carole Costa
- (Portugal) Edite Fernandes
- (Portugal) Cristiana Garcia
- (Portugal) Vanessa Malho
- (Portugal) Mónica Mendes
- (Portugal) Cláudia Neto
- (Portugal) Regina Pereira

1 own goal

- (Albania) Lucie Gjini (playing against the Netherlands)
- (Albania) Ezmiralda Franja (playing against Greece)
- (Greece) Efrosini Xera (playing against Portugal)
