= List of international goals scored by Tessa Wullaert =

Tessa Wullaert is a Belgian professional footballer who represents the Belgium women's national football team as a forward. As of 8 April 2025, she has scored 90 times, making her the top goalscorer in both women's and the overall national record, having scored more than Romelu Lukaku.

== International goals ==
As of match played 8 April 2025

Scores and results list Belgium's goal tally first, score column indicates score after each Wullaert goal.

List of international goals scored by Tessa Wullaert
G	C	Date	Venue	Opponent	Score	Result	Competition
1	1	20 August 2011	Stade Armand-Melis, Dessel, Belgium	Russia	1–0	1–0	Friendly
2	2	17 September 2011	Stade Armand-Melis, Dessel, Belgium	Hungary	1–0	2–1	UEFA Women's Euro 2013 qualifying
3	5	15 February 2012	Stade Armand-Melis, Dessel, Belgium	Northern Ireland	2–1	2–2	UEFA Women's Euro 2013 qualifying
4	6	4 April 2012	Stade Armand-Melis, Dessel, Belgium	Iceland	1–0	1–0	UEFA Women's Euro 2013 qualifying
5	8	9 June 2012	Henri Houtsaegerstadion, Koksijde, Belgium	North Korea	2–2	2–2	Friendly
6	11	15 September 2012	Ullevaal Stadion, Oslo, Norway	Norway	1–2	2–3	UEFA Women's Euro 2013 qualifying
7	13	9 February 2013	Regenboogstadion, Waregem, Belgium	Netherlands	1–0	2–3	Friendly
8	14	13 February 2013	PGB-Stadion, Oostakker, Belgium	Austria	1–0	2–0	Friendly
9	15	2 June 2013	Stade Leburton, Tubize, Belgium	Ukraine	3–0	3–0	Friendly
10	19	26 October 2013	Levadia Stadium, Livadeia	Greece	4–1	7–1	2015 FIFA Women's World Cup qualification
11	19	26 October 2013	Levadia Stadium, Livadeia	Greece	7–1	7–1	2015 FIFA Women's World Cup qualification
12	20	31 October 2013	Bosuilstadion, Antwerp, Belgium	Portugal	2–1	4–1	2015 FIFA Women's World Cup qualification
13	20	31 October 2013	Bosuilstadion, Antwerp, Belgium	Portugal	4–1	4–1	2015 FIFA Women's World Cup qualification
14	23	5 April 2014	Niko Dovana Stadium, Durrës, Albania	Albania	2–0	6–0	2015 FIFA Women's World Cup qualification
15	26	13 September 2014	Stade Eneco, Leuven, Belgium	Greece	4–0	11–0	2015 FIFA Women's World Cup qualification
16	26	13 September 2014	Stade Eneco, Leuven, Belgium	Greece	6–0	11–0	2015 FIFA Women's World Cup qualification
17	26	13 September 2014	Stade Eneco, Leuven, Belgium	Greece	8–0	11–0	2015 FIFA Women's World Cup qualification
18	26	13 September 2014	Stade Eneco, Leuven, Belgium	Greece	11–0	11–0	2015 FIFA Women's World Cup qualification
19	27	17 September 2014	Estádio Municipal de Abrantes, Abrantes, Portugal	Portugal	1–0	1–0	2015 FIFA Women's World Cup qualification
20	28	22 November 2014	Stadion Ludowy, Sosnowiec, Poland	Poland	1–0	4–0	Friendly
21	29	11 February 2015	Estadio José Antonio Pérez, San Pedro del Pinatar, Spain	Spain	1–0	1–2	Friendly
22	30	3 March 2015	Paralimni Stadium, Paralimni, Cyprus	Czech Republic	2–2	2–2	2015 Cyprus Cup
23	34	23 May 2015	Stayen, Sint-Truiden, Belgium	Norway	3–2	3–2	Friendly
24	37	27 October 2015	Bilino Polje Stadium, Zenica, Bosnia and Herzegovina	Bosnia and Herzegovina	3–0	5–0	UEFA Women's Euro 2017 qualifying
25	37	27 October 2015	Bilino Polje Stadium, Zenica, Bosnia and Herzegovina	Bosnia and Herzegovina	4–0	5–0	UEFA Women's Euro 2017 qualifying
26	42	9 March 2016	Complexo Desportivo de VRSA, Vila Real de Santo António, Portugal	Russia	1–0	5–0	2016 Algarve Cup
27	44	12 April 2016	Stade Eneco, Leuven, Belgium	Estonia	3–0	6–0	UEFA Women's Euro 2017 qualifying
28	44	12 April 2016	Stade Eneco, Leuven, Belgium	Estonia	5–0	6–0	UEFA Women's Euro 2017 qualifying
29	52	3 March 2017	AEK Arena, Larnaca, Cyprus	Italy	1–1	4–1	Friendly
30	54	8 March 2017	AEK Arena, Larnaca, Cyprus	Austria	1–0	1–1	Friendly
31	56	11 April 2017	Stade Eneco, Leuven, Belgium	Scotland	3–0	5–0	Friendly
32	60	11 July 2017	Van Roystadion, Denderleeuw, Belgium	Russia	1–0	2–0	Friendly
33	63	24 July 2017	Koning Willem II Stadion, Tilburg, Netherlands	Netherlands	1–1	1–2	UEFA Women's Euro 2017
34	64	19 September 2017	Stade Eneco, Leuven, Belgium	Moldova	2–0	12–0	2019 FIFA Women's World Cup qualification
35	64	19 September 2017	Stade Eneco, Leuven, Belgium	Moldova	3–0	12–0	2019 FIFA Women's World Cup qualification
36	64	19 September 2017	Stade Eneco, Leuven, Belgium	Moldova	5–0	12–0	2019 FIFA Women's World Cup qualification
37	65	20 October 2017	Stade Eneco, Leuven, Belgium	Romania	1–0	3–2	2019 FIFA Women's World Cup qualification
38	69	7 March 2018	GSZ Stadium, Larnaca, Cyprus	South Africa	1–1	2–1	2018 Cyprus Cup
39	72	20 June 2018	Stade Zimbru, Chișinău, Moldavo	Moldova	6–0	7–0	2019 FIFA Women's World Cup qualification
40	81	24 May 2019	Municipal Pylos Stadium, Pylos, Greece	Greece	2–0	2–1	Friendly
41	82	1 June 2019	Stade Eneco, Leuven, Belgium	Thailand	2–0	6–1	Friendly
42	86	8 November 2019	Ivan Laljak-Ivić Stadium, Zaprešić, Croatia	Croatia	1–0	4–1	UEFA Women's Euro 2021 qualifying
43	91	18 September 2020	Den Dreef, Leuven, Belgium	Romania	1–0	6–1	UEFA Women's Euro 2021 qualifying
44	91	18 September 2020	Den Dreef, Leuven, Belgium	Romania	3–0	6–1	UEFA Women's Euro 2021 qualifying
45	91	18 September 2020	Den Dreef, Leuven, Belgium	Romania	4–0	6–1	UEFA Women's Euro 2021 qualifying
46	92	22 September 2020	Stockhorn Arena, Thun, Switzerland	Switzerland	1–2	1–2	UEFA Women's Euro 2021 qualifying
47	93	27 October 2020	Sūduva Stadium, Marijampolė, Lithuania	Lithuania	1–0	9–0	UEFA Women's Euro 2021 qualifying
48	93	27 October 2020	Sūduva Stadium, Marijampolė, Lithuania	Lithuania	7–0	9–0	UEFA Women's Euro 2021 qualifying
49	93	27 October 2020	Sūduva Stadium, Marijampolė, Lithuania	Lithuania	8–0	9–0	UEFA Women's Euro 2021 qualifying
50	94	1 December 2020	Den Dreef, Leuven, Belgium	Switzerland	3–0	4–0	UEFA Women's Euro 2021 qualifying
51	100	21 September 2021	King Baudouin Stadium, Brussels, Belgium	Albania	6–0	7–0	2023 FIFA Women's World Cup qualification
52	101	21 October 2021	Den Dreef, Leuven, Belgium	Kosovo	3–0	7–0	2023 FIFA Women's World Cup qualification
53	101	21 October 2021	Den Dreef, Leuven, Belgium	Kosovo	6–0	7–0	2023 FIFA Women's World Cup qualification
54	101	21 October 2021	Den Dreef, Leuven, Belgium	Kosovo	7–0	7–0	2023 FIFA Women's World Cup qualification
55	103	25 November 2021	Den Dreef, Leuven, Belgium	Armenia	2–0	19–0	2023 FIFA Women's World Cup qualification
56	103	25 November 2021	Den Dreef, Leuven, Belgium	Armenia	10–0	19–0	2023 FIFA Women's World Cup qualification
57	103	25 November 2021	Den Dreef, Leuven, Belgium	Armenia	12–0	19–0	2023 FIFA Women's World Cup qualification
58	103	25 November 2021	Den Dreef, Leuven, Belgium	Armenia	17–0	19–0	2023 FIFA Women's World Cup qualification
59	103	25 November 2021	Den Dreef, Leuven, Belgium	Armenia	18–0	19–0	2023 FIFA Women's World Cup qualification
60	105	7 April 2022	Elbasan Arena, Elbasan, Albania	Albania	2–0	5–0	2023 FIFA Women's World Cup qualification
61	105	7 April 2022	Elbasan Arena, Elbasan, Albania	Albania	4–0	5–0	2023 FIFA Women's World Cup qualification
62	106	12 April 2022	Fadil Vokrri Stadium, Pristina, Kosovo	Kosovo	2–0	6–1	2023 FIFA Women's World Cup qualification
63	106	12 April 2022	Fadil Vokrri Stadium, Pristina, Kosovo	Kosovo	3–0	6–1	2023 FIFA Women's World Cup qualification
64	106	12 April 2022	Fadil Vokrri Stadium, Pristina, Kosovo	Kosovo	4–0	6–1	2023 FIFA Women's World Cup qualification
65	106	12 April 2022	Fadil Vokrri Stadium, Pristina, Kosovo	Kosovo	5–0	6–1	2023 FIFA Women's World Cup qualification
66	108	23 June 2022	Herman Vanderpoortenstadion, Lier, Belgium	Northern Ireland	1–0	3–1	Friendly
67	108	23 June 2022	Herman Vanderpoortenstadion, Lier, Belgium	Northern Ireland	3–1	3–1	Friendly
68	115	6 September 2022	Yerevan Football Academy Stadium, Yerevan, Armenia	Armenia	4–0	7–0	2023 FIFA Women's World Cup qualification
69	116	6 October 2022	Estádio do FC Vizela, Vizela, Portugal	Portugal	1–1	2–1	2023 FIFA WC Qualy play-offs
70	117	13 November 2022	Joseph Marien Stadium, Brussels, Belgium	Slovakia	3–0	7–0	Friendly
71	117	13 November 2022	Joseph Marien Stadium, Brussels, Belgium	Slovakia	6–0	7–0	Friendly
72	118	16 February 2023	Stadium MK, Milton Keynes, England	Italy	2–1	2–1	2023 Arnold Clark Cup
73	119	19 February 2023	Coventry Building Society Arena, Coventry, England	South Korea	1–1	2–1	2023 Arnold Clark Cup
74	121	11 April 2023	Den Dreef, Leuven, Belgium	Slovenia	1–1	2–2	Friendly
75	121	11 April 2023	Den Dreef, Leuven, Belgium	Slovenia	2–1	2–2	Friendly
76	125	31 October 2023	Den Dreef, Leuven, Belgium	England	2–2	3–2	2023–24 UEFA Women's Nations League
77	125	31 October 2023	Den Dreef, Leuven, Belgium	England	3–2	3–2	2023–24 UEFA Women's Nations League
78	128	23 February 2024	Pancho Aréna, Felcsút, Hungary	Hungary	2–1	5–1	2023–24 UEFA Women's Nations League play-offs
79	128	23 February 2024	Pancho Aréna, Felcsút, Hungary	Hungary	4–1	5–1	2023–24 UEFA Women's Nations League play-offs
80	129	27 February 2024	Den Dreef, Leuven, Belgium	Hungary	1–1	5–1	2023–24 UEFA Women's Nations League play-offs
81	129	27 February 2024	Den Dreef, Leuven, Belgium	Hungary	2–1	5–1	2023–24 UEFA Women's Nations League play-offs
82	129	27 February 2024	Den Dreef, Leuven, Belgium	Hungary	3–1	5–1	2023–24 UEFA Women's Nations League play-offs
83	132	31 May 2024	Eden Arena, Prague, Czech Republic	Czech Republic	1–0	2–1	UEFA Women's Euro 2025 qualifying
84	137	29 October 2024	Den Dreef, Leuven, Belgium	Greece	2–0	5–0	UEFA Women's Euro 2025 qualifying play-offs
85	137	29 October 2024	Den Dreef, Leuven, Belgium	Greece	3–0	5–0	UEFA Women's Euro 2025 qualifying play-offs
86	138	29 November 2024	Mardan Sports Complex, Antalya, Turkey	Ukraine	2–0	2–0	UEFA Women's Euro 2025 qualifying play-offs
87	139	3 December 2024	Den Dreef, Leuven, Belgium	Ukraine	2–1	2–1	UEFA Women's Euro 2025 qualifying play-offs
88	140	21 February 2025	Estadi Ciutat de València, Valencia, Spain	Spain	2–0	2–3	2025 UEFA Women's Nations League
89	142	8 April 2025	Den Dreef, Leuven, Belgium	England	1–0	3–2	2025 UEFA Women's Nations League
90	142	8 April 2025	Den Dreef, Leuven, Belgium	England	3–0	3–2	2025 UEFA Women's Nations League
