= List of international goals scored by Manon Melis =

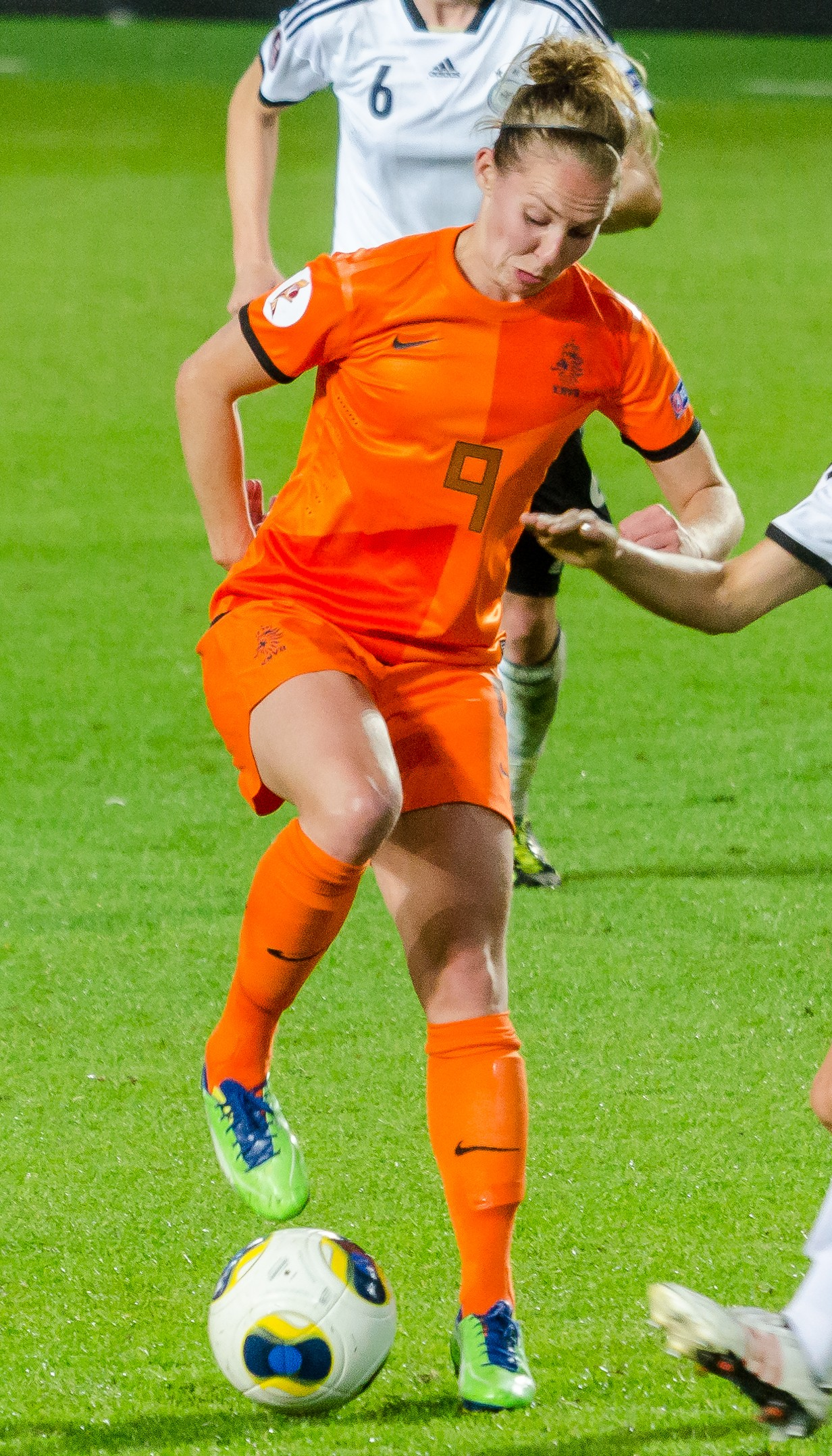
Manon Melis playing for the Netherlands during the UEFA Women's Euro 2013

Manon Melis is a retired Dutch professional footballer who played as a forward for the Netherlands women's national team from 2004 to 2016. During her international career she scored 59 goals from 136 games. From 2010 to 2019 she was the all-time top goalscorer for her country.

Melis scored on her debut for the senior national team on 25 April 2004, in an away game against Belgium, aged 17. Not until her 16th cap did she score again. An even longer goal drought followed, playing 17 matches in which she was unable to score her third. She helped the Dutch qualify for their first major finals by scoring in six of the eight matches in UEFA Women's Euro 2009 qualifying. At the finals held in Finland Melis played five matches, in which she scored once, against Denmark. On 21 August 2010 Melis became the all-time top goalscorer for the Netherlands after scoring twice against Belarus, her 29th and 30th international goals. She overtook Marjoke de Bakker's goal tally of 29, achieved between 1979 and 1991. At the 2013 Euros she played three matches but did not score and the Netherlands were eliminated at the group stage.

Melis earned her last cap on 9 March 2016 in a home game against Sweden, a qualification game for the 2016 Olympics. She scored her last goal, her 59th, in the penultimate match of her career, against Norway. Hers was the only Dutch goal in the 4–1 loss. Her highest number of goals in one match was four, scored in a 6–0 win over Serbia in 2011. In September 2013, she scored a hat-trick against Albania during 2015 FIFA Women's World Cup qualification. Serbia and Switzerland are the teams against which she has scored the most, six goals total, from two and six games respectively. Four of her 59 goals came from penalties; 25 were scored on home soil. Her most productive year was 2011 with 10 goals from 12 games. For nearly nine years Melis held the all-time goalscoring record, until 15 June 2019, when Vivianne Miedema surpassed Melis by scoring her 60th goal in a 3–1 win over Cameroon at a group stage match at the FIFA World Cup Finals in France. As of July 2025, Melis ranks third on the all-time goalscoring list for the Netherlands women's football team, behind Miedema and Lieke Martens.

== International goals ==
"Score" represents the score in the match after Melis's goal. "Score" and "Result" list the Netherlands' goal tally first. Cap represents the player's appearance in an international level match at senior level.

Key
‡	Indicates goal was scored from a penalty kick

Goals by Melis for the Netherlands' senior national team
G	C	Date	Venue	Opponent	Score	Result	Competition	Ref
1	1	25 April 2004	Den Dreef, Leuven, Belgium	Belgium	2–0	3–0	2005 UEFA Women's Euro qualification	
2	16	12 October 2005	Oosterenkstadion, Zwolle, Netherlands	Switzerland	5–0	6–0	Friendly	
3	34	21 February 2007	Mitsubishi Forklift Stadion, Almere, Netherlands	Italy	2–0	2–0	Friendly	
4	35	14 March 2007	County Ground, Swindon, England	England	1–0	1–0	Friendly	
5	37	9 May 2007	Herti Allmend Stadion, Zug, Switzerland	Switzerland	1–0	2–2	2009 UEFA Women's Euro qualification	
6	39	26 August 2007	Veronica Stadium, Volendam, Netherlands	Wales	1–0	2–1	2009 UEFA Women's Euro qualification	
7	40	1 October 2007	Mitsubishi Forklift Stadion, Almere, Netherlands	France	1–4	1–4	Friendly	
8	42	27 January 2008	Frank Cooke Park, Dublin, Ireland	Republic of Ireland	1–0	1–1	Friendly	
9	43	20 February 2008	Newport Stadium, Newport, Wales	Wales	1–0	1–0	2009 UEFA Women's Euro qualification	
10	44	23 April 2008	Patrostadion, Maasmechelen, Belgium	Belgium	2–2	2–2	2009 UEFA Women's Euro qualification	
11	46	30 August 2008	Den Haag Stadion, The Hague, Netherlands	Switzerland	1–0	1–1	2009 UEFA Women's Euro qualification	
12	47	27 September 2008	Kras Stadion, Volendam, Netherlands	Belgium	1–0	3–0	2009 UEFA Women's Euro qualification	
13	47	27 September 2008	Kras Stadion, Volendam, Netherlands	Belgium	2–0	3–0	2009 UEFA Women's Euro qualification	
14	48	5 March 2009	Makario Stadium, Nicosia, Cyprus	Russia	1–0	2–1	2009 Cyprus Cup	
15	48	5 March 2009	Makario Stadium, Nicosia, Cyprus	Russia	2–1	2–1	2009 Cyprus Cup	
16	50	12 March 2009	GSP Stadium, Nicosia, Cyprus	South Africa	1–0	5–0	2009 Cyprus Cup	
17	50	12 March 2009	GSP Stadium, Nicosia, Cyprus	South Africa	3–0	5–0	2009 Cyprus Cup	
18	51	11 July 2009	Olympic Stadium, Amsterdam, Netherlands	Switzerland	2–0	5–0	Four Nations Cup	
19	52	15 July 2009	Olympic Stadium, Amsterdam, Netherlands	China	2–4	2–4	Four Nations Cup	
20	54	8 August 2009	Koning Willem II Stadion, Tilburg, Netherlands	Poland	1–0	2–0	Friendly	
21	58	29 August 2009	Lahden Stadion, Lahti, Finland	Denmark	2–0	2–1	2009 UEFA Women's Euro	
22	62	29 October 2009	Oosterenkstadion, Zwolle, Netherlands	Macedonia	3–0	13–1	2011 FIFA Women's World Cup qualification	
23	64	24 February 2010	GSP Stadium, Nicosia, Cyprus	Scotland	1–0	4–1	2010 Cyprus Cup	
24	64	24 February 2010	GSP Stadium, Nicosia, Cyprus	Scotland	3–1	4–1	2010 Cyprus Cup	
25	65	26 February 2010	Ammochostos Stadium, Larnaca, Cyprus	New Zealand	1–1	1–1	2010 Cyprus Cup	
26	67	3 March 2010	GSP Stadium, Nicosia, Cyprus	Switzerland	1–0	4–0	2010 Cyprus Cup	
27	69	22 April 2010	Gradski Stadion, Kumanovo, Macedonia	Macedonia	5–0	7–0	2011 FIFA Women's World Cup qualification	
28	70	19 June 2010	Oosterenkstadion, Zwolle, Netherlands	Norway	1–0	2–2	2011 FIFA Women's World Cup qualification	
29	71	21 August 2010	Haradzki Stadium, Maladzechna, Belarus	Belarus	2–0	4–0	2011 FIFA Women's World Cup qualification	
30	71	21 August 2010	Haradzki Stadium, Maladzechna, Belarus	Belarus	3–0	4–0	2011 FIFA Women's World Cup qualification	
31	72	2 March 2011	GSP Stadium, Nicosia, Cyprus	New Zealand	2–0	4–1	2011 Cyprus Cup	
32	72	2 March 2011	GSP Stadium, Nicosia, Cyprus	New Zealand	3–0	4–1	2011 Cyprus Cup	
33	73	4 March 2011	Ammochostos Stadium, Larnaca, Cyprus	France	2–1	2–1	2011 Cyprus Cup	
34	77	18 May 2011	De Koel, Venlo, Netherlands	North Korea	1–1	1–1	Friendly	
35	80	24 August 2011	Hohhot City Stadium, Hohhot, China	China	1–0	1–0	Friendly	
36	81	21 September 2011	TATA Steel Stadion, Velsen-Zuid, Netherlands	Serbia	1–0	6–0	2013 UEFA Women's Euro qualification	
37	81	21 September 2011	TATA Steel Stadion, Velsen-Zuid, Netherlands	Serbia	3–0	6–0	2013 UEFA Women's Euro qualification	
38	81	21 September 2011	TATA Steel Stadion, Velsen-Zuid, Netherlands	Serbia	5–0	6–0	2013 UEFA Women's Euro qualification	
39	81	21 September 2011	TATA Steel Stadion, Velsen-Zuid, Netherlands	Serbia	6–0	6–0	2013 UEFA Women's Euro qualification	
40	82	22 October 2011	Gradski stadion, Vrbovec, Croatia	Croatia	1–0	3–0	2013 UEFA Women's Euro qualification	
41	85	28 February 2012	GSZ Stadium, Larnaca, Cyprus	Italy	1–1	2–1	2012 Cyprus Cup	
42	89	5 April 2012	De Koel, Venlo, Netherlands	Slovenia	3–1	3–1	2013 UEFA Women's Euro qualification	
43	91	20 June 2012	Stadion Srem Jakovo, Jakovo, Serbia	Serbia	1–0	4–0	2013 UEFA Women's Euro qualification	
44	91	20 June 2012	Stadion Srem Jakovo, Jakovo, Serbia	Serbia	2–0	4–0	2013 UEFA Women's Euro qualification	
45	97	9 April 2013	Kyocera Stadion, The Hague, Netherlands	United States	1–3	1–3	Friendly	
46	102	26 September 2013	Qemal Stafa Stadium, Tirana, Albania	Albania	1–0	4–0	2015 FIFA Women's World Cup qualification	
47	102	26 September 2013	Qemal Stafa Stadium, Tirana, Albania	Albania	2–0	4–0	2015 FIFA Women's World Cup qualification	
48	102	26 September 2013	Qemal Stafa Stadium, Tirana, Albania	Albania	3–0	4–0	2015 FIFA Women's World Cup qualification	
49	104	23 November 2013	Stadion Woudestein, Rotterdam, Netherlands	Greece	4–0 ‡	7–0	2015 FIFA Women's World Cup qualification	
50	107	7 March 2014	GSP Stadium, Nicosia, Cyprus	Scotland	3–4	3–4	2014 Cyprus Cup	
51	109	5 April 2014	Pankritio Stadium, Heraklion, Greece	Greece	1–0	6–0	2015 FIFA Women's World Cup qualification	
52	115	25 October 2014	Tynecastle Stadium, Edinburgh, Scotland	Scotland	2–0 ‡	2–1	2015 FIFA Women's World Cup qualification	
53	116	30 October 2014	Sparta Stadion, Rotterdam, Netherlands	Scotland	2–0	2–0	2015 FIFA Women's World Cup qualification	
54	123	8 April 2015	Strømmen Stadion, Strømmen, Norway	Norway	2–1	3–2	Friendly	
55	124	30 May 2015	York Stadium, Toronto, Canada	Sweden	1–0	1–2	Friendly	
56	131	29 November 2015	Kras Stadion, Volendam, Netherlands	Japan	2–0	3–1	Friendly	
57	131	29 November 2015	Kras Stadion, Volendam, Netherlands	Japan	3–1 ‡	3–1	Friendly	
58	134	2 March 2016	Kyocera Stadion, The Hague, Netherlands	Switzerland	1–1 ‡	4–3	2016 UEFA Women's Olympic qualification	
59	135	5 March 2016	Het Kasteel, Rotterdam, Netherlands	Norway	1–2	1–4	2016 UEFA Women's Olympic qualification	

== Statistics ==
Appearances and goals by year
National team	Year	Apps	Goals
Netherlands	2004	7	1
Netherlands	2005	11	1
Netherlands	2006	15	0
Netherlands	2007	8	5
Netherlands	2008	6	6
Netherlands	2009	16	9
Netherlands	2010	8	8
Netherlands	2011	12	10
Netherlands	2012	10	4
Netherlands	2013	11	5
Netherlands	2014	14	4
Netherlands	2015	13	4
Netherlands	2016	5	2
Total		136	59

Goals by competition
Competition	Goals
Friendlies	13
FIFA World Cup qualifiers	12
UEFA European Championship qualifiers	16
FIFA World Cup finals	0
UEFA European Championship finals	1
Other	17
Total	59

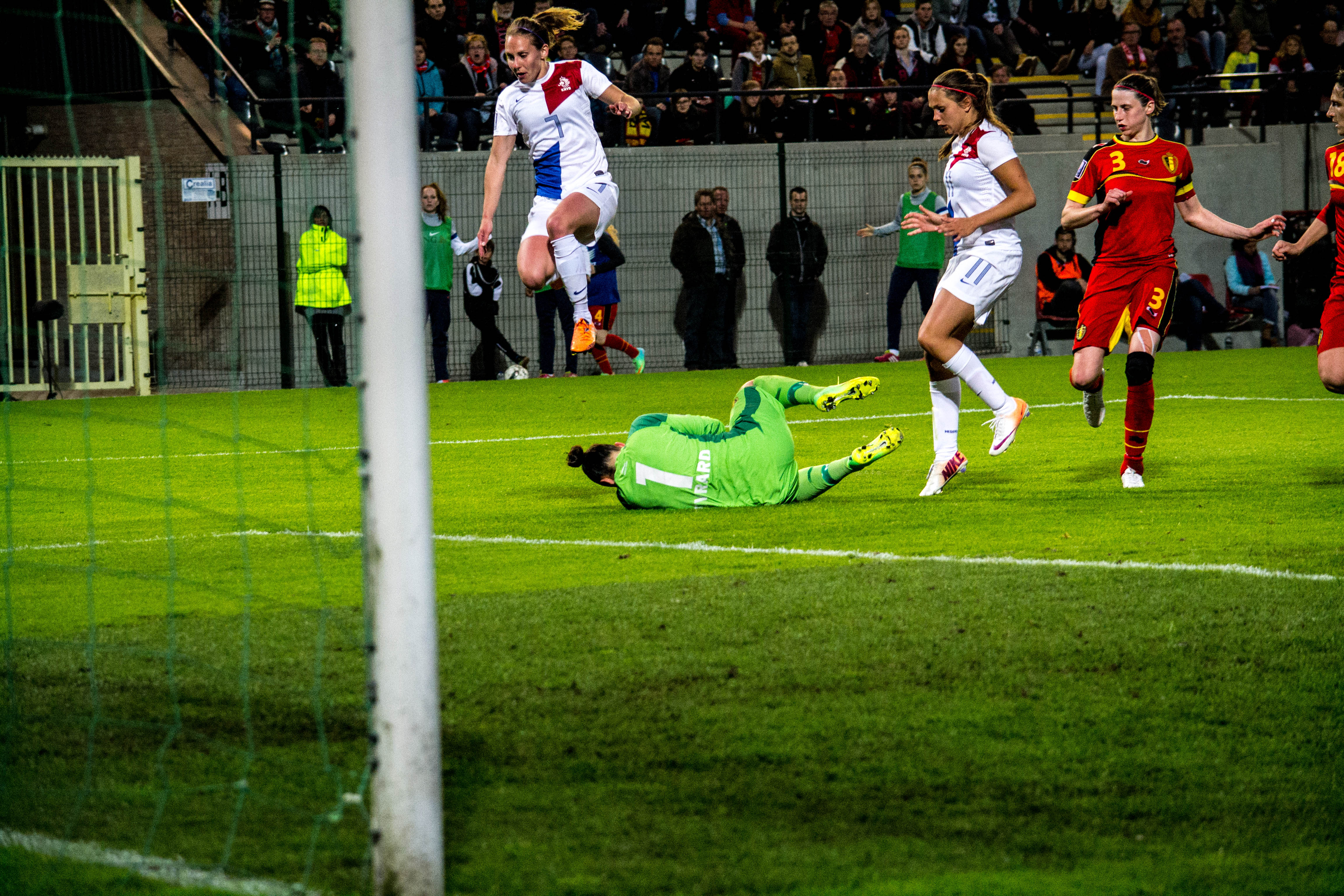
Manon Melis (7) jumps over Belgium's goalkeeper in May 2014
