= Jéssica Silva =

Portuguese footballer (born 1994)

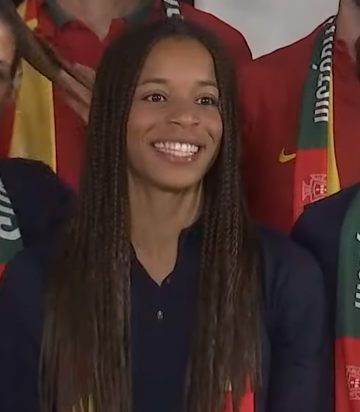
- Silva in 2023

Personal information
- Full name: Jéssica Lisandra Manjenje Nogueira Silva
- Date of birth: 11 December 1994 (age 31)
- Place of birth: Vila Nova de Milfontes, Portugal
- Height: 1.70 m (5 ft 7 in)
- Positions: Winger; forward

Team information
- Current team: Galatasaray
- Number: 20

Senior career*
Years	Team	Apps	(Gls)
2011–2014	Clube de Albergaria	22	(21)
2014	Linköpings FC	2	(0)
2014–2016	Clube de Albergaria	14	(11)
2016–2017	Braga	12	(12)
2017–2019	Levante	41	(6)
2019–2021	Olympique Lyonnais	2	(1)
2021	Kansas City Current	14	(0)
2022–2024	Benfica	38	(24)
2024–2025	Gotham FC	6	(0)
2025–2026	Al Hilal SFC		
2026–	Galatasaray	0	(0)

International career^{‡}
2011–2013	Portugal U19	21	(4)
2011–	Portugal	129	(20)
- * Club domestic league appearances and goals as of 30 June 2025 ‡ National team caps and goals as of 2 December 2025

Jéssica Lisandra Manjenje Nogueira Silva (born 11 December 1994) is a Portuguese professional footballer who plays as a winger or forward for Turkish Super League club Galatasaray and the Portugal national team.

== Club career ==
Silva had a half-year spell with Swedish Damallsvenskan club Linköpings FC from July to December 2014 and played for Clube de Albergaria from 2014 until 2016. From 2017 to 2019 she played for Levante UD in Spain.

On 10 May 2021, Silva was announced at Kansas City Current on a two year contract.

On 16 August 2024, NJ/NY Gotham FC announced that they had signed Silva through the 2024 season. She scored her first goal with Gotham on 3 October 2024, in a 13–0 drubbing over Frazsiers Whip FC in the CONCACAF W Champions Cup. After her first season at Gotham, Silva was re-signed by the club to a short-term extension.

On June 18, 2026, she signed a contract with the Turkish giant Galatasaray.

== International career ==
Silva was born in Portugal to an Angolan father and Portuguese mother, with both of her grandmothers of Angolan descent. In September 2011, she made her senior debut for the Portugal women's national football team, in a 1–0 UEFA Women's Euro 2013 qualifying defeat by Austria in Pombal.

Silva was named by coach Francisco Neto in the final 23-player Portugal squad for UEFA Women's Euro 2017 in the Netherlands. But in the last training session before departing for the tournament, she was injured. Diana Gomes was called up by Neto as her replacement.

On 30 May 2023, she was included in the 23-player squad for the FIFA Women's World Cup 2023.

On 24 June 2025, Silva was called up to the Portugal squad for the UEFA Women's Euro 2025.

== Career statistics ==
=== Club ===
As of 30 June 2025

Appearances and goals by club, season and competition
Club	Season	League					National cup (Note: Includes Taça de Portugal, Svenska Cupen, Copa de la Reina, Coupe de France)		League cup (Note: Includes Taça da Liga and NWSL Challenge Cup)		Continental (Note: Includes UEFA Women's Champions League and CONCACAF W Champions Cup)		Other (Note: Includes Supertaça de Portugal)		Total	
Club	Season	Division	Regular Season		Playoffs		National cup		League cup		Continental		Other		Total	
Club	Season	Division	Apps	Goals	Apps	Goals	Apps	Goals	Apps	Goals	Apps	Goals	Apps	Goals	Apps	Goals
Clube de Albergaria	2011–12	Campeonato Nacional Feminino	3	3	—		2	1	—		—		—		5	4
Clube de Albergaria	2012–13	Campeonato Nacional Feminino	18	18	—		1	1	—		—		—		19	19
Clube de Albergaria	2013–14	Campeonato Nacional Feminino	1	0	—		0	0	—		—		—		1	0
Clube de Albergaria	Total		22	21	—		3	2	—		—		—		25	23
Linköpings FC	2014	Damallsvenskan	2	0	—		1	0	—		—		—		3	0
Clube de Albergaria	2015–16	Campeonato Nacional Feminino	14	11	—		0	0	—		—		1	0	15	11
Braga	2016–17	Campeonato Nacional Feminino	12	12	—		2	0	—		—		—		14	12
Levante	2017–18	Primera División	20	4	—		2	0	—		—		—		22	4
Levante	2018–19	Primera División	21	2	—		2	0	—		—		—		23	2
Levante	Total		41	6	—		4	0	—		—		—		45	6
Lyon	2019–20	D1 Féminine	2	1	—		1	0	—		3	1	—		6	2
Lyon	2020–21	D1 Féminine	0	0	—		0	0	—		0	0	—		0	0
Lyon	Total		2	1	—		0	0	—		0	0	—		2	1
Kansas City Current	2021	NWSL	14	0	—		—		—		—		—		14	0
Benfica	2021–22	Campeonato Nacional Feminino	9	5	—		1	0	3	0	—		—		13	5
Benfica	2022–23	Campeonato Nacional Feminino	16	16	—		3	2	5	2	10	3	1	0	35	23
Benfica	2023–24	Campeonato Nacional Feminino	13	3	—		4	2	2	0	7	4	0	0	26	9
Benfica	Total		38	24	—		8	4	10	2	17	7	1	0	74	37
Gotham FC	2024	NWSL	3	0	1	0	—		0	0	3	1	0	0	7	1
Gotham FC	2025	NWSL	3	0	0	0	—		0	0	1	0	0	0	4	0
Gotham FC	Total		6	0	1	0	—		0	0	4	1	0	0	11	1
Career total			151	75	1	0	19	6	10	2	24	9	2	0	207	92

=== International ===
As of match played 2 December 2025

Appearances and goals by national team and year
National team	Year	Apps	Goals
Portugal	2011	1	0
Portugal	2012	4	0
Portugal	2013	6	1
Portugal	2014	14	4
Portugal	2015	9	2
Portugal	2016	2	0
Portugal	2017	7	0
Portugal	2018	15	0
Portugal	2019	11	2
Portugal	2020	1	0
Portugal	2021	11	1
Portugal	2022	15	3
Portugal	2023	12	3
Portugal	2024	9	3
Portugal	2025	12	1
Total		129	20

Scores and results list Portugal's goal tally first, score column indicates score after each Silva goal.

List of international goals scored by Jéssica Silva
No.	Date	Venue	Opponent	Score	Result	Competition
1	26 September 2013	Fyli Municipal Stadium, Fyli, Greece	Greece	5–1	5–1	2015 FIFA Women's World Cup qualification
2	12 February 2014	Estádio Municipal de Abrantes, Abrantes, Portugal	Albania	5–1	7–1	2015 FIFA Women's World Cup qualification
3	7 March 2014	Stadium Bela Vista, Parchal, Portugal	Austria	2–0	3–2	2014 Algarve Cup
4	12 March 2014	Estádio Algarve, Faro, Portugal	Austria	1–2	1–2	2014 Algarve Cup
5	13 September 2014	De Koel, Venlo, Netherlands	Netherlands	1–1	2–3	2015 FIFA Women's World Cup qualification
6	9 March 2015	Estádio Municipal, Vila Real de Santo António, Portugal	Denmark	2–2	2–2	2015 Algarve Cup
7	11 March 2015	Stadium Bela Vista, Parchal, Portugal	China	3–3	3–3 (8–7 p)	2015 Algarve Cup
8	1 March 2019	Albufeira Municipal Stadium, Albufeira, Portugal	Sweden	1–1	2–1	2019 Algarve Cup
9	4 October 2019	Elbasan Arena, Elbasan, Albania	Albania	1–0	1–0	UEFA Women's Euro 2022 qualifying
10	16 September 2021	Bahçeşehir Okulları Stadium, Alanya, Turkey	Turkey	1–1	1–1	2023 FIFA Women's World Cup qualification
11	22 June 2022	Estádio do Restelo, Lisbon, Portugal	Greece	3–0	4–0	Friendly
12	9 July 2022	Leigh Sports Village, Leigh, England	Switzerland	2–2	2–2	UEFA Women's Euro 2022
13	15 November 2022	Estádio FC Alverca, Alverca, Portugal	Costa Rica	1–0	1–0	Friendly
14	17 February 2023	Waikato Stadium, Hamilton, New Zealand	New Zealand	1–0	5–0	Friendly
15	7 July 2023	Estádio do Bessa, Porto, Portugal	Ukraine	1–0	2–0	Friendly
16	7 July 2023	Estádio do Bessa, Porto, Portugal	Ukraine	2–0	2–0	Friendly
17	27 February 2024	Estádio António Coimbra da Mota, Estoril, Portugal	South Korea	4–0	5–1	Friendly
18	27 February 2024	Estádio António Coimbra da Mota, Estoril, Portugal	South Korea	5–0	5–1	Friendly
19	16 July 2024	Estádio Dr. Magalhães Pessoa, Leiria, Portugal	Malta	3–1	3–1	UEFA Women's Euro 2025 qualifying
20	26 October 2025	Pratt & Whitney Stadium, East Hartford, United States	United States	1–1	1–3	Friendly
21	7 March 2026	Estádio Cidade de Barcelos, Barcelos, Portugal	Slovakia	4–0	4–0	2027 FIFA Women's World Cup qualification
22	9 October 2026	Inver Park, Larne, Northern Ireland	Northern Ireland	2–0	4–0	2027 FIFA Women's World Cup qualifying

== Honors ==
Benfica

- Campeonato Nacional Feminino: 2021–22, 2022–23, 2023–24
- Taça de Portugal: 2023–24
- Taça da Liga: 2022–23, 2023–24
- Supertaça de Portugal: 2022, 2023

Gotham FC

- CONCACAF W Champions Cup: 2024–25

Lyon

- Division 1 Féminine: 2019–20
- UEFA Women's Champions League: 2019–20

Linköpings FC

- Svenska Cupen: 2014, 2015
