= ARMIR =

Armir or ARMIR may refer to:

== People ==
- Armir Grimaj, Albanian football player

== ARMIR ==
- Armata Italiana in Russia, an army-sized unit of the Italian Royal Army (Regio Esercito Italiano), during World War II
