= Carolina Mendes =

Portuguese footballer (born 1987)

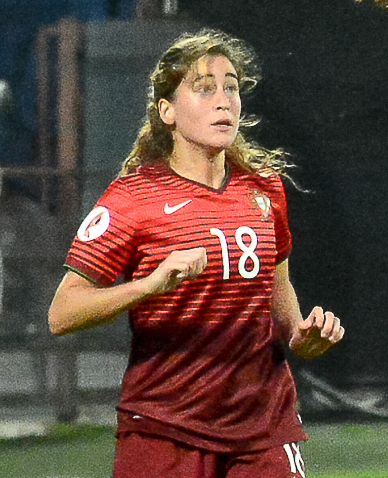
- Mendes in 2016

Personal information
- Full name: Carolina Ana Trindade Coruche Mendes
- Date of birth: 27 November 1987 (age 38)
- Place of birth: Estremoz, Portugal
- Height: 1.72 m (5 ft 8 in)
- Positions: Midfielder; forward

Team information
- Current team: Racing Power

Youth career
- Electrico Futebol Club
- Desportalegre

Senior career*
Years	Team	Apps	(Gls)
2007–2009	Ponte Frielas		
2009–2011	1º de Dezembro	5	(0)
2011–2012	L'Estartit		(2)
2012–2013	Llanos de Olivenza	29	(4)
2013–2014	Riviera di Romagna	21	(7)
2014–2016	Rossiyanka	27	(5)
2016	Djurgården	14	(3)
2017	Grindavík	17	(3)
2017–2018	Atalanta Mozzanica	21	(6)
2018–2021	Sporting CP	53	(25)
2021–2024	SC Braga	55	(13)
2024–	Racing Power	22	(4)

International career^{‡}
2004–2006	Portugal U19	21	(15)
2007–	Portugal	124	(24)
- * Club domestic league appearances and goals as of 16 June 2025 ‡ National team caps and goals as of 16 June 2025

Carolina Ana Trindade Coruche Mendes (born 27 November 1987) is a Portuguese footballer who plays as a forward for Racing Power and the Portugal women's national team.

== Club career ==
Mendes first played for UD Ponte Frielas and SU 1º de Dezembro of the National Football Championship. She subsequently moved to Spain, where she played for UE L'Estartit and SPC Llanos de Olivenza in Spain's Primera División.

In 2013, she moved to Italy's ASD Riviera di Romagna, and the next year she signed for WFC Rossiyanka in Russia. In 2016 Mendes signed a contract with Djurgårdens IF for one year.

== International career ==
Mendes made her debut for the senior Portugal national team in March 2007, as a substitute in a 1–1 draw with Ireland at the 2007 Algarve Cup. She was named by coach Francisco Neto in the Portugal squad for UEFA Women's Euro 2017 in the Netherlands.

In Portugal's 2–1 win over Scotland, Mendes scored the national team's first-ever goal at major international tournament finals. She scored again in the final group match against England, but Portugal lost 2–1 and was eliminated.

On 30 May 2023, she was included in the 23-player squad for the FIFA Women's World Cup 2023.

== Career statistics ==
Scores and results list Portugal's goal tally first.

No.	Date	Venue	Opponent	Score	Result	Competition
1.	17 September 2011	Mika Stadium, Yerevan, Armenia	Armenia	1–0	8–0	UEFA Women's Euro 2013 qualification
2.	2 March 2012	Estádio Municipal, Parchal, Portugal	Hungary	2–0	4–0	2012 Algarve Cup
3.	31 March 2012	Estádio João Cardoso, Tondela, Portugal	Czech Republic	2–5	2–5	UEFA Women's Euro 2013 qualification
4.	16 January 2014	Estádio Machico, Machico, Portugal	Switzerland	1–0	1–2	2015 FIFA Women's World Cup qualification
5.	12 February 2014	Estádio Municipal de Abrantes, Abrantes, Portugal	Albania	1–0	7–1	2015 FIFA Women's World Cup qualification
6.	12 February 2014	Estádio Municipal de Abrantes, Abrantes, Portugal	Albania	3–0	7–1	2015 FIFA Women's World Cup qualification
7.	12 February 2014	Estádio Municipal de Abrantes, Abrantes, Portugal	Albania	5–1	7–1	2015 FIFA Women's World Cup qualification
8.	7 March 2014	Stadium Bela Vista, Parchal, Portugal	Russia	1–0	1–3	2014 Algarve Cup
9.	26 November 2015	Estádio António Coimbra da Mota, Estoril, Portugal	Montenegro	3–1	6–1	UEFA Women's Euro 2017 qualifying
10.	23 July 2017	Sparta Stadion Het Kasteel, Rotterdam, Netherlands	Scotland	1–0	2–1	UEFA Women's Euro 2017
11.	27 July 2017	Koning Willem II Stadion, Tilburg, Netherlands	England	1–1	1–2	UEFA Women's Euro 2017
12.	16 September 2017	Estádio Municipal de Arouca, Arouca, Portugal	Finland	1–0	1–1	Friendly
13.	24 November 2017	Estádio do Bonfim, Setúbal, Portugal	Moldova	1–0	8–0	2019 FIFA Women's World Cup qualification
14.	28 February 2018	Lagos Municipal Stadium, Lagos, Portugal	China	1–1	2–1	2018 Algarve Cup
15.	30 June 2018	Zimbru Stadium, Chișinău, Moldova	Moldova	1–0	7–0	2019 FIFA Women's World Cup qualification
16.	6 October 2018	Yongchuan Sports Center, Chongqing, China	Thailand	2–1	4–1	2018 Yongchuan International Tournament
17.	6 October 2018	Yongchuan Sports Center, Chongqing, China	Thailand	3–1	4–1	2018 Yongchuan International Tournament
18.	6 October 2018	Yongchuan Sports Center, Chongqing, China	Thailand	4–1	4–1	2018 Yongchuan International Tournament
19.	9 April 2019	Complexo Desportivo FC Alverca, Alverca do Ribatejo, Portugal	Hungary	1–0	4–1	Friendly
20.	25 November 2021	Estádio Municipal de Portimão, Portimão, Portugal	Israel	1–0	4–0	2023 FIFA Women's World Cup qualification
21.	25 November 2021	Estádio Municipal de Portimão, Portimão, Portugal	Israel	2–0	4–0	2023 FIFA Women's World Cup qualification
22.	25 November 2021	Estádio Municipal de Portimão, Portimão, Portugal	Israel	3–0	4–0	2023 FIFA Women's World Cup qualification
23.	16 February 2022	Estádio Municipal de Lagos, Lagos, Portugal	Norway	2–0	2–0	2022 Algarve Cup
24.	21 February 2024	Estádio António Coimbra da Mota, Estoril, Portugal	Czech Republic	2–0	3–1	Friendly

== Honours ==
Braga

- Taça da Liga: 2021–22

1º de Dezembro

- Campeonato Nacional Feminino: 2010–11
- Taça de Portugal: 2010–11

Rossiyanka

- Russian Women's Football Championship: 2016
