= Vanessa Marques =

Portuguese footballer (born 1996)

Personal information
- Full name: Vanessa Marques Malho
- Date of birth: 12 April 1996 (age 30)
- Place of birth: Lyon, France
- Height: 1.75 m (5 ft 9 in)
- Position: Midfielder

Team information
- Current team: Racing Power
- Number: 17

Youth career
- 2005–2009: CC Taipas

Senior career*
| Years | Team | Apps | (Gls) |
| 2010–2014 | Vilaverdense | 9 | (6) |
| 2014–2016 | Valadares Gaia | 7 | (9) |
| 2016–2020 | Braga | 67 | (68) |
| 2020–2021 | Ferencváros | 17 | (5) |
| 2021–2023 | Braga | 36 | (15) |
| 2023 | Famalicão | 13 | (3) |
| 2024– | Racing Power | 7 | (0) |

International career^{‡}
| 2012–2015 | Portugal U19 | 31 | (19) |
| 2012– | Portugal | 89 | (12) |
- * Club domestic league appearances and goals as of 21 June 2024 ‡ National team caps and goals as of 21 June 2024

Vanessa Marques Malho (born 12 April 1996) is a Portuguese football midfielder who plays for Racing Power and the Portugal national team.

== International goals ==
| No. | Date | Venue | Opponent | Score | Result | Competition |
|---|---|---|---|---|---|---|
| 1. | 14 June 2014 | Loni Papuçiu Stadium, Fier | Albania | 0–3 | 0–3 | 2015 FIFA Women's World Cup qualification |
| 2. | 10 February 2015 | Estádio do Mergulhão, Cesar | Switzerland | 1–0 | 2–1 | Friendly |
| 3. | 24 November 2017 | Estádio do Bonfim, Setúbal | Moldova | 6–0 | 8–0 | 2019 FIFA Women's World Cup qualification |
| 4. | 24 November 2017 | Estádio do Bonfim, Setúbal | Moldova | 8–0 | 8–0 | 2019 FIFA Women's World Cup qualification |
| 5. | 7 March 2018 | Albufeira Municipal Stadium, Albufeira | Australia | 2–1 | 2–1 | 2018 Algarve Cup |
| 6. | 30 August 2018 | Zimbru Stadium, Chișinău | Moldova | 0–3 | 0–7 | 2019 FIFA Women's World Cup qualification |
| 7. | 30 August 2018 | Zimbru Stadium, Chișinău | Moldova | 0–4 | 0–7 | 2019 FIFA Women's World Cup qualification |
| 8. | 6 April 2019 | Complexo Desportivo FC Alverca, Alverca do Ribatejo | Hungary | 1–1 | 2–1 | Friendly |
| 9. | 9 April 2019 | Complexo Desportivo FC Alverca, Alverca do Ribatejo | Hungary | 3–1 | 4–1 | Friendly |
| 10. | 12 April 2022 | Estádio Cidade de Barcelos, Barcelos | Bulgaria | 2–0 | 3–0 | 2023 FIFA Women's World Cup qualification |
| 11. | 11 November 2022 | Estádio Municipal José Martins Vieira, Almada, Portugal | Haiti | 1–0 | 5–0 | 2023 FIFA Women's World Cup qualification play-offs |
| 12. | 11 November 2022 | Estádio Municipal José Martins Vieira, Almada, Portugal | Haiti | 2–0 | 5–0 | 2023 FIFA Women's World Cup qualification play-offs |
