= Lien Mermans =

Belgian footballer

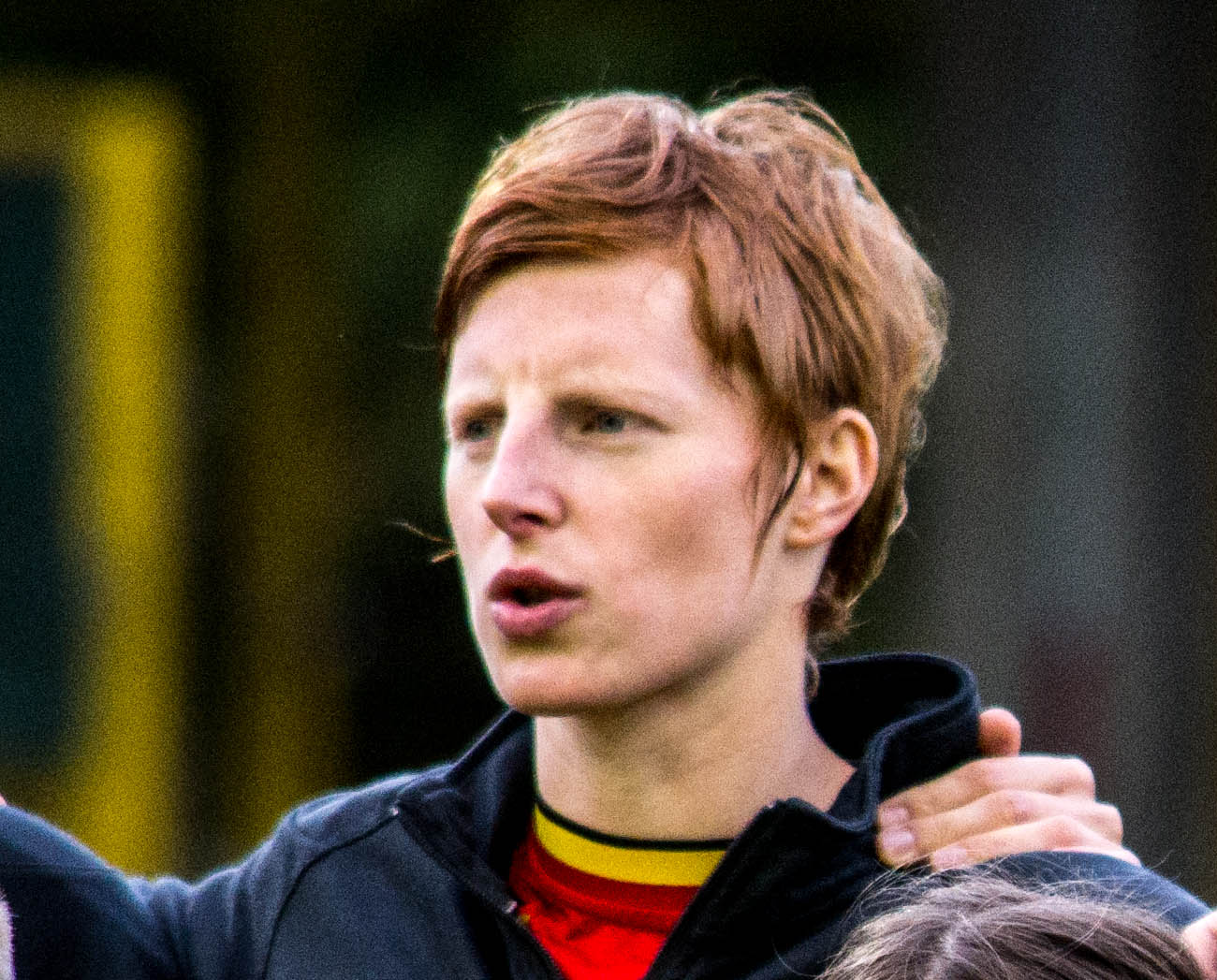
- Mermans in 2014

Personal information
- Full name: Lien Mermans
- Date of birth: 27 September 1990 (age 36)
- Place of birth: Belgium
- Height: 1.67 m (5 ft 6 in)
- Position: Attacking midfielder

Team information
- Current team: VC Moldavo
- Number: 14

Senior career*
Years	Team	Apps	(Gls)
2008–2009	Vlimmeren Sport	?	(4)
2009–2010	DVC Eva's Tienen	?	(?)
2010–2016	Lierse SK	65	(19)
2016–2018	Genk	28	(7)
2018–	VC Moldavo	?	(?)

International career^{‡}
2005	Belgium U15	1	(0)
2005	Belgium U17	4	(0)
2005–2009	Belgium U19	18	(4)
2009–2017	Belgium	48	(9)
- * Club domestic league appearances and goals as of 21:00, 24 September 2022 (UTC) ‡ National team caps and goals as of 21:00, 24 September 2022 (UTC)

Lien Mermans (born 27 September 1990) is a Belgian football midfielder who last played for VC Moldavo.

== Club career ==
Mermans started her senior career at Vlimmeren, which later became known as Women's Department Lierse SK.

After 1 year with DVC Eva's Tienen, she returned to Lierse where she played from 2010 until 2016. During that period, they won the Belgian Cup twice. At the end of the 2015/16 season, Lierse's women's department folded because of financial problems and Mermans subsequently joined KRC Genk Ladies. Her first year at Genk saw some good performances rewarded with "The Sparkle" trophy - the women's equivalent of the Belgian Golden Shoe.

She missed out on most of the 2017/18 season and the UEFA Women's Euro 2017 tournament because of an inflammation on the heart muscle. At the end of 2018, Mermans announced her retirement from the national team and signed for D1 team VC Moldavo.

== International career ==
Mermans was a long-time member of the Belgian women's national team. At youth level she played for U-15, U-17 and U-19.

On sep. 5, 2009 she earned her first cap for the senior team in a friendly game against Romania where she substituted Femke Maes in the 88th minute. The match ended in a 2–7 win for Belgium.

The first time she scored was on 20 juni 2012, during a qualification match for UEFA Women's Euro 2013 in an away game against Hungary. Mermans started the match and scored 0–1 in the 13th minute.

Mermans' 48th and final cap was in a friendly against Scotland on 11 April 2017, where she scored 2–0 in the 46th minute. The game ended in a 5–0 victory.

== Personal life ==
Mermans works full-time as a physical education teacher.

== Career statistics ==
International

Appearances and goals by national team and year
National team	Year	Apps	Goals
Belgium U15	2005	1	0
Total		1	0
Belgium U17	2005	4	0
Total		4	0
Belgium U19	2005	1	0
Belgium U19	2006	3	1
Belgium U19	2007	3	0
Belgium U19	2008	6	3
Belgium U19	2009	6	0
Total		19	4
Belgium	2009	2	0
Belgium	2010	2	0
Belgium	2011	7	0
Belgium	2012	9	1
Belgium	2013	7	2
Belgium	2014	8	4
Belgium	2015	1	0
Belgium	2016	6	0
Belgium	2017	6	2
Total		48	9

List of international goals scored by Lien Mermans
No.	Date	Venue	Opponent	Score	Result	Competition	Ref.
1	20 June 2012	Haladás Sportkomplexum, Szombathely, Hungary	Hungary	0–1	1–3	2013 W-EURO Qualy Group 3	
2	2 June 2013	Proximus Basecamp, Tubize, Belgium	Ukraine	1–0	3–0	Friendly	
3	2 June 2013	Proximus Basecamp, Tubize, Belgium	Ukraine	2–0	3–0	Friendly	
4	5 April 2014	Niko Dovana Stadium, Durrës, Albania	Albania	0–3	0–6	2015 FIFA WC, UEFA Group 5	
5	13 September 2014	Den Dreef, Louvain, Belgium	Greece	3–0	11–0	2015 FIFA WC, UEFA Group 5	
6	13 September 2014	Den Dreef, Louvain, Belgium	Greece	5-0	11–0	2015 FIFA WC, UEFA Group 5	
7	22 November 2014	Sosnowiec, Poland	Poland	1–4	1–4	Friendly	
8	1 March 2017	GSZ Stadium, Larnaca, Cyprus	Switzerland	1-1	2–2	2017 Cyprus Women's Cup	
9	11 April 2017	Den Dreef, Louvain, Belgium	Scotland	2-0	5–0	Friendly	

== Honours ==
Lierse SK

Runners-up

- Belgian Women's Super Cup: 2012–13

Individual

- Winner of The Sparkle trophy: 2017
