= Ida Elise Enget =

Norwegian footballer (born 1989)

Personal information
- Date of birth: 14 June 1989 (age 37)
- Place of birth: Folldal Municipality, Norway
- Position: Forward

Senior career*
| Years | Team | Apps | (Gls) |
| 2008–2010 | Lillestrøm | 24+ | (13) |
| 2011–2016 | Stabæk | 125 | (27) |

International career^{‡}
| 2005–200? | Norway U-19 | 24 | (15) |
| 2014 | Norway | 1 | (1) |
- * Club domestic league appearances and goals as of 5 November 2016 ‡ National team caps and goals as of 17 September 2014

Ida Elise Enget (born 14 June 1989) is a Norwegian footballer who plays as a forward. She has been a member of the Norway women's national team.

== International goals ==
| No. | Date | Venue | Opponent | Score | Result | Competition |
|---|---|---|---|---|---|---|
| 1. | 13 September 2014 | Niko Dovana Stadium, Durrës, Albania | Albania | 11–0 | 11–0 | 2015 FIFA Women's World Cup qualifying |
