= Sara Maliqi =

Albanian footballer (born 1995)

Personal information
- Date of birth: 9 October 1995 (age 31)
- Place of birth: Kaçanik, FR Yugoslavia (now Kosovo)
- Position: Defender

Team information
- Current team: Ünye
- Number: 6

Senior career*
Years	Team	Apps	(Gls)
- KF Vllaznia Shkodër
2025–	Ünye	10	(0)

International career
2014–2024	Albania	58	(0)
- * Club domestic league appearances and goals as of 13 September 2026

Sara Maliqi (born 9 October 1995) is a footballer who plays as a defender for Ünye in the Turkish Super League. Born in Kosovo, she has appeared for the Albania national team.

== Club career ==
In September 2025, Maliqi moved to Turkey, and signed with Ünye to play in the Turkish Super League.

== International career ==
Maliqi was a member of the national team during the 2019 FIFA Women's World Cup qualifying cycle.

She announced her retirement from international football on 4 June 2024 after playing her 58th and final game for Albania against Luxembourg at Elbasan Arena.

== See also ==
- List of Albania women's international footballers
