= Armir Grimaj =

Albanian footballer and manager

Personal information
- Date of birth: 16 June 1974 (age 52)
- Place of birth: Shkodër, PR Albania
- Height: 1.85 m (6 ft 1 in)
- Position: Goalkeeper

Team information
- Current team: Albania (women) (manager)

Youth career
- Vllaznia Shkodër

Senior career*
Years	Team	Apps	(Gls)
1993–1998	Vllaznia	124	(0)
1998–1999	Ethnikos	2	(0)
1999–2000	Vllaznia	11	(0)
2000–2001	Dinamo Tirana	13	(0)
2001–2002	Partizani	2	(0)
2002–2004	Vllaznia	45	(0)
2004–2005	Partizani	0	(0)
2005–2011	Vllaznia	123	(0)
Total		320	(0)

International career
1998–2000	Albania	4	(0)

Managerial career
- 2012: Vllaznia
- 2015–2016: Vllaznia
- 2016–: Albania (women)
- * Club domestic league appearances and goals

Armir Grimaj (born 16 June 1974) is an Albanian professional football coach and former player who is the manager of the Albania women's national team.

As a player, he played as a goalkeeper. Born in Shkodër, Grimaj spent most of his playing career with hometown club Vllaznia and also had a spell abroad with Ethnikos Piraeus in the Super League Greece.

He represented the Albania national team between 1998 and 2000, earning four caps in two editions of the Malta International Tournament.

== International career ==
Grimaj made his debut for Albania in a 1998 Malta International Tournament match against Georgia in February 1998. He earned four caps for Albania. His final international appearance came in a 2000 Malta International Tournament match against Andorra in February 2000.

=== International statistics ===
Appearances and goals by national team and year
National team	Year	Apps	Goals
Albania	1998	2	0
Albania	2000	2	0
Total		4	0

== Managerial career ==
On 22 April 2016, Grimaj was appointed head coach of the Albania women's national team, replacing Altin Rraklli.

== Personal life ==
Grimaj is married to Flora Grimaj and they have four children: Morena, Marina, Griselda, and Grimaldi.

=== Legal issues ===
In September 2018, Grimaj was arrested as part of an investigation into the "Bajri" criminal group over allegations of match fixing.
