= Valentina Troka =

Albanian footballer

Personal information
- Date of birth: 15 November 2002 (age 23)
- Place of birth: Fier, Albania
- Position: Forward

Team information
- Current team: Sultanbeyli Gücü
- Number: 15

Senior career*
Years	Team	Apps	(Gls)
2019-2020	Apolonia	16	(9)
2020–2021	Tirana AS	20	(28)
2021-2024	Apolonia	55	(162)
2024-2026	Trabzonspor	30	(8)
2026-	Sultanbeyli Gücü	8	(2)

International career^{‡}
2021–	Albania	13	(0)
- * Club domestic league appearances and goals as of 1 November 2026 ‡ National team caps and goals as of 3 June 2025 (UTC)

Valentina Troka (born 15 November 2002) is an Albanian women's football forward who plays in the Turkish Super League for Sultanbeyli Gücü and the Albania national team.

== Club career ==
Troka played for Tirana AS in the 2020–21 season before she transferred to Apolonia .

In September 2024, she moved to Turkey, and signed with Trabzonspor to play in the Super League.

== International career ==
Tr>oka made her debut for the Albania national team on 9 April 2021, coming on as a substitute for Luçije Gjini against Bosnia and Herzegovina. On 7 April 2023 she scored her first two goals in a friendly match against North Macedonia.

== Career statistics ==
=== Club ===
Appearances and goals by club, season, and competition. Only official games are included in this table.(Update: 1 November 2026)
Club	Season	League		Cup		Europe		Total	
Club	Season	Apps	Goals	Apps	Goals	Apps	Goals	Apps	Goals
Apolonia	2019-20	16	9	2	0	0	0	18	9
Tirana AS	2020-21	20	28	2	1	0	0	22	29
Apolonia	2021-22	17	26	0	0	0	0	17	26
Apolonia	2022-23	18	66	5	5	0	0	23	71
Apolonia	2023-24	20	70	4	5	0	0	24	75
Total		55	162	9	10	0	0	64	172
Trabzonspor	2024-25	24	6	0	0	0	0	24	6
Trabzonspor	2025-26	6	2	0	0	0	0	6	2
Total		30	8	0	0	0	0	30	8
Sultanbeyli Gücü	2026-27	8	2	0	0	0	0	8	2
Grand Total		129	209	13	11	0	0	142	220

== Personal life ==
Valentina Troka was born in Fier, Albania on 15 November 2002.

== See also ==
- List of Albania women's international footballers
