= Efrosini Xera =

Greek footballer

Personal information
- Full name: Efrosini Xera
- Date of birth: 12 June 1992 (age 34)
- Place of birth: Greece
- Position: Defender

Team information
- Current team: Ethnikos Piraeus WFC

Youth career
- 2000–2004: Laura Argyroupolis

Senior career*
Years	Team	Apps	(Gls)
2004–2011	Aegina		
2011–2022	Ergotelis		
2022–2024	Olympiada Imittou		
2024–2025	Acharnaikos		
2025–2026	Chalkida		
2026–	Ethnikos		

International career^{‡}
2010	Greece U19	3	(0)
2011–	Greece	11	(0)
- * Club domestic league appearances and goals as of 29 March 2025 ‡ National team caps and goals as of 18:55, 3 April 2015 (UTC)

Efrosini Xera (born 12 June 1992) is a Greek football defender.
