= Cécile De Gernier =

Belgian footballer

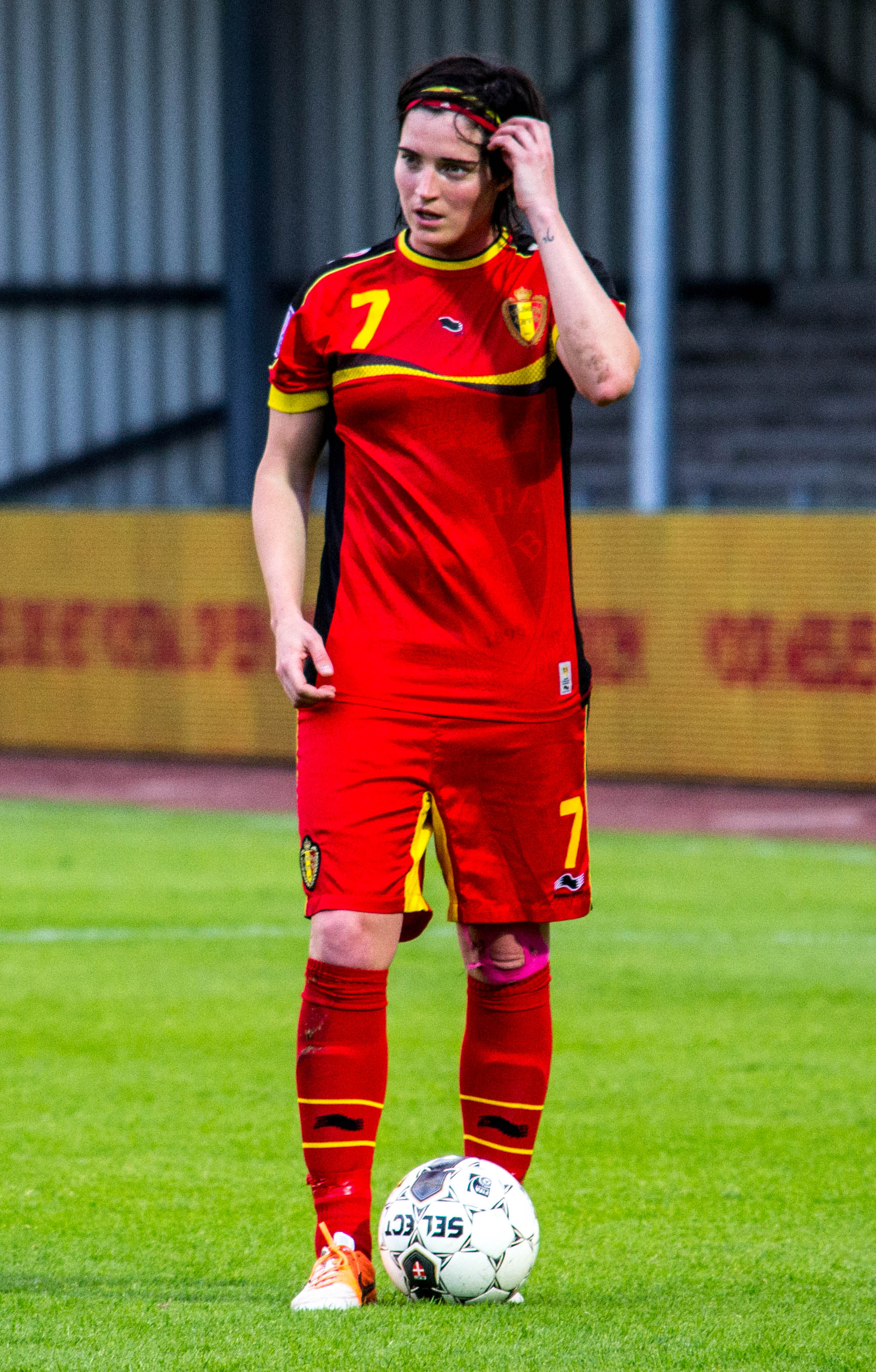
- De Gernier in 2014

Personal information
- Full name: Cécile De Gernier
- Date of birth: 25 May 1986 (age 40)
- Place of birth: Uccle, Belgium
- Position: Midfielder

Team information
- Current team: Standard Liège
- Number: 16

Senior career*
Years	Team	Apps	(Gls)
2008–	Standard Liège	68	(19)

International career^{‡}
2011–2016	Belgium	28	(5)
- * Club domestic league appearances and goals as of 3 April 2015 ‡ National team caps and goals as of 7 March 2016

Cécile De Gernier (born 25 May 1986) is a Belgian football midfielder currently playing for Standard Liège.

== Honours ==
Standard Liège

Winner

- Belgian Women's First Division (3): 2008–09, 2010–11, 2011–12
- Belgian Women's Cup (2): 2011–12, 2013–14
- BeNe Super Cup (2): 2011–12, 2012–13
- Belgian Women's Super Cup: 2012–13

Runners-up

- BeNe League (2): 2012–13, 2013–14
