= Sophia Koggouli =

Greek footballer

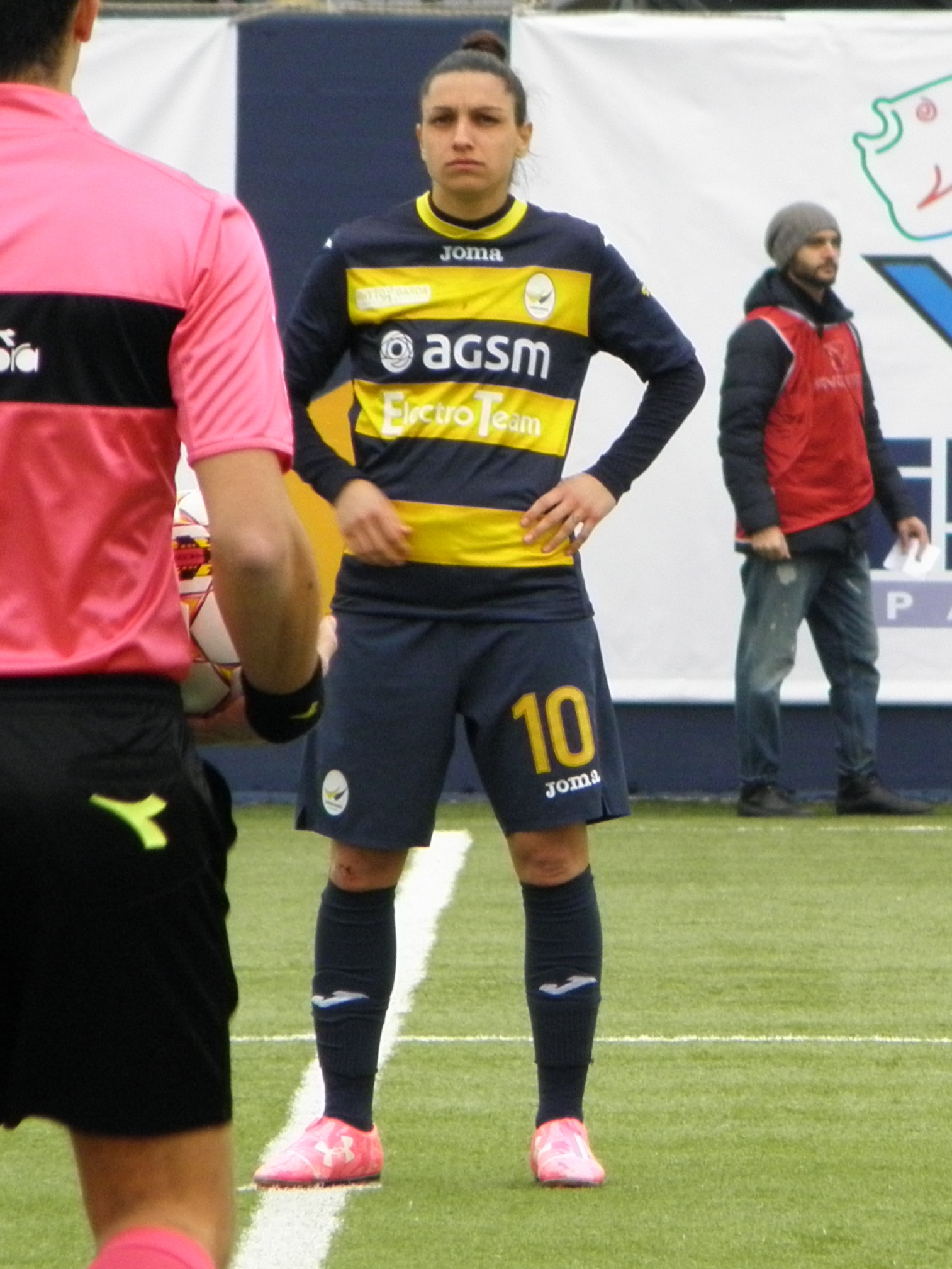
- Koggouli on AGSM Verona 2017-18 uniform

Personal information
- Full name: Sophia Koggouli
- Date of birth: 26 July 1991 (age 35)
- Place of birth: Larissa, Greece
- Position: Striker

Team information
- Current team: AEK Athens
- Number: 10

Youth career
- 2001–2005: Kentavros Larissas

Senior career*
Years	Team	Apps	(Gls)
2006–2016	Elpides Karditsas	192	(183)
2016–2018	AGSM Verona	28	(7)
2018–2019	Fiorentina	10	(1)
2019–2020	Tavagnacco	9	(2)
2020–2021	Diósgyőri VTK	8	(1)
2021–2022	Tavagnacco	37	(11)
2022–2023	Cittadella	29	(15)
2023–2024	Parma	22	(7)
2024–	AEK	48	(23)

International career^{‡}
2008	Greece U19	2	(0)
2009–	Greece	96	(26)
- * Club domestic league appearances and goals as of ‡ National team caps and goals as of

Sophia Koggouli (born 26 July 1991) is a Greek footballer who plays as a forward for AEK Athens in the Greek A Division and the Greece national team.

== Career ==
Koggouli finished as the Greek Division A top scorer for seven consecutive years (from 2009 to 2016), scoring a total of 183 goals during that time while playing for Elpides Karditsas, before transferring to Italian team AGSM Verona in June 2016. In July 2018, Koggouli moved to fellow Serie A side Fiorentina. A year later, Koggouli joined her third Italian team, Tavagnacco.

== International goals ==
No.	Date	Venue	Opponent	Score	Result	Competition
1.	26 October 2013	Levadia Municipal Stadium, Livadeia, Greece	Belgium	1–2	1–7	2015 FIFA Women's World Cup qualification
2.	12 March 2014	Glyfada Municipal Stadium, Athens, Greece	Cyprus	1–0	3–0	Friendly
3.	12 March 2014	Glyfada Municipal Stadium, Athens, Greece	Cyprus	2–0	3–0	Friendly
4.	17 September 2014	Veria Stadium, Veria, Greece	Albania	2–0	4–0	2015 FIFA Women's World Cup qualification
5.	12 March 2015	Peyia Municipal Stadium, Pegeia, Cyprus	Lebanon		14–0	Aphrodite Women Cup
6.	12 March 2015	Peyia Municipal Stadium, Pegeia, Cyprus	Lebanon		14–0	Aphrodite Women Cup
7.	15 March 2015	Peyia Municipal Stadium, Pegeia, Cyprus	Latvia		4–1	Aphrodite Women Cup
8.	15 March 2015	Peyia Municipal Stadium, Pegeia, Cyprus	Latvia		4–1	Aphrodite Women Cup
9.	18 March 2015	Stelios Kyriakides Stadium, Paphos, Cyprus	Cyprus	1–0	2–0	Aphrodite Women Cup
10.	26 January 2016	Trikala Municipal Stadium, Trikala, Greece	Albania	2–0	3–2	UEFA Women's Euro 2017 qualifying
11.	8 April 2017	Selman Stërmasi Stadium, Tirana, Albania	Kosovo	5–0	6–0	2019 FIFA Women's World Cup qualification
12.	11 November 2018	Anthi Karagianni Stadium, Kavala, Greece	Slovakia	1–1	1–1	Friendly
13.	8 April 2022	Lilleküla Stadium, Tallinn, Estonia	Estonia	1–0	3–1	2023 FIFA Women's World Cup qualification
14.	8 April 2022	Lilleküla Stadium, Tallinn, Estonia	Estonia	2-0	3–1	2023 FIFA Women's World Cup qualification
15.	12 April 2022	Pampeloponnisiako Stadium, Patras, Greece	Estonia	2–0	3–0	2023 FIFA Women's World Cup qualification
16.	6 September 2022	Stade Louis Dugauguez, Sedan, France	France	1–2	1–5	2023 FIFA Women's World Cup qualification
17.	4 June 2024	Tórsvøllur, Tórshavn, Faroe Islands	Faroe Islands	2–0	2–0	UEFA Women's Euro 2025 qualifying
18.	12 July 2024	Theodoros Vardinogiannis Stadium, Heraklion, Greece	Andorra	1–0	6–0	UEFA Women's Euro 2025 qualifying
19.	12 July 2024	Theodoros Vardinogiannis Stadium, Heraklion, Greece	Andorra	3–0	6–0	UEFA Women's Euro 2025 qualifying
20.	16 July 2024	Camp FSCG, Podgorica, Montenegro	Montenegro	1–0	3–2	UEFA Women's Euro 2025 qualifying
21.	16 July 2024	Camp FSCG, Podgorica, Montenegro	Montenegro	3–0	3–2	UEFA Women's Euro 2025 qualifying
22.	1 December 2024	NTC Senec, Senec, Slovakia	Slovakia	1–0	2–1	Friendly
23.	1 December 2024	NTC Senec, Senec, Slovakia	Slovakia	2–1	2–1	Friendly
24.	2 December 2025	BH FF Training Center, Zenica, Bosnia and Herzegovina	Bosnia and Herzegovina	1–0	1–1	Friendly
25.	7 March 2026	Theodoros Vardinogiannis Stadium, Heraklion, Greece	Faroe Islands	2–0	2–0	2027 FIFA Women's World Cup qualification

== Honours ==
AEK

- Greek A Division (1): 2024–25
- Greek Cup (1): 2025

== Career statistics ==
=== Club ===
Club	Season	Division	League		Cup		Continental		Total	
Club	Season	Division	Apps	Goals	Apps	Goals	Apps	Goals	Apps	Goals
Elpides Karditsas	2006–07	Greek Regional League	?	?	—		—		?	?
Elpides Karditsas	2007–08	Greek Regional League	?	?	—		—		?	?
Elpides Karditsas	2008–09	Greek Regional League	?	?	—		—		?	?
Elpides Karditsas	2009–10	Greek A Division	?	?	—		—		?	?
Elpides Karditsas	2010–11	Greek A Division	24	27	—		—		24	27
Elpides Karditsas	2011–12	Greek A Division	16	21	—		—		16	21
Elpides Karditsas	2012–13	Greek A Division	17	18	4	5	—		21	23
Elpides Karditsas	2013–14	Greek A Division	16	23	4	4	—		20	27
Elpides Karditsas	2014–15	Greek A Division	17	24	2	2	—		19	26
Elpides Karditsas	2015–16	Greek A Division	17	25	1	0	—		18	25
Elpides Karditsas	Total		181	172	11	11	—		192	183
Verona	2016–17	Serie A	6	1	2	0	—		8	1
Verona	2017–18	Serie A	22	6	5	5	—		27	11
Verona	Total		28	7	7	5	—		35	12
Fiorentina	2018–19	Serie A	10	1	2	2	2	0	14	3
Tavagnacco	2019–20	Serie A	9	2	0	0	—		9	2
Diósgyőri VTK	2020–21	Női NB I	8	1	1	0	—		9	1
Tavagnacco	2020–21	Serie B	12	1	0	0	—		12	1
Tavagnacco	2021–22	Serie B	25	10	2	0	—		27	10
Tavagnacco	Total		37	11	2	0	—		39	11
Citadella	2022–23	Serie B	29	15	2	3	—		31	18
Parma	2023–24	Serie B	22	7	2	0	—		24	7
AEK	2024–25	Greek A Division	20	16	4	1	—		24	17
AEK	2025–26	Greek A Division	22	6	5	0	2	3	29	9
AEK	2026-27	Greek A Division	6	1					6	1
AEK	Total		48	23	9	1	2	3	59	27
Total career			372	239	36	22	4	3	412	264
