= Cristiana Garcia =

Portuguese footballer (born 1990)

Personal information
- Full name: Cristiana Isabel Gomes Garcia
- Date of birth: 1 September 1990 (age 36)
- Place of birth: Caldas da Rainha, Portugal
- Height: 1.60 m (5 ft 3 in)
- Position: Midfielder

Team information
- Current team: Atlético Ouriense
- Number: 66

Senior career*
Years	Team	Apps	(Gls)
2008–2015	A-dos-Francos		
2015–2016	Atlético Ouriense		
2016–2017	A-dos-Francos		
2017	S.C. Braga		
2017–2018	Estoril Praia		
2018–	Atlético Ouriense		

International career^{‡}
2012–2014	Portugal	6	(1)
- * Club domestic league appearances and goals ‡ National team caps and goals as of 18:52, 28 December 2018 (UTC)

Cristiana Isabel Gomes Garcia (born 1 September 1990) is a Portuguese football midfielder who plays for Atlético Ouriense of the Campeonato Nacional de Futebol Feminino.

== International career ==
In April 2012, Garcia made her senior debut for the Portugal women's national football team, in a 1–0 UEFA Women's Euro 2013 qualifying defeat by Austria at Stadion Wiener Neustadt. Garcia was named by coach Francisco Neto in a provisional 25-player Portugal squad for UEFA Women's Euro 2017 in the Netherlands, but was one of two players to miss out on the final 23-woman squad.
