= Mónica Mendes =

Portuguese footballer (born 1993)

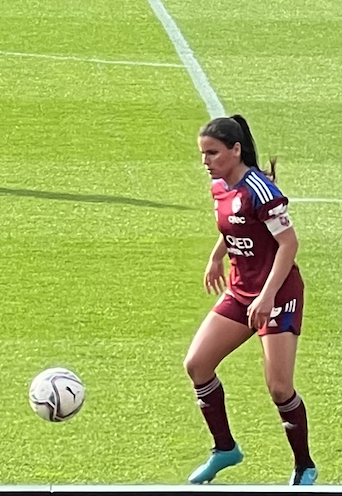
- Mendes with Servette in the Swiss Cup final in 2023.

Personal information
- Full name: Mónica Soraia Amaral Mendes
- Date of birth: 16 June 1993 (age 33)
- Place of birth: Almada, Portugal
- Height: 1.66 m (5 ft 5 in)
- Position: Centre-back

Team information
- Current team: Servette FC Chênois
- Number: 16

Youth career
- Beira-Mar de Almada

College career
Years	Team	Apps	(Gls)
2011–2015	University of Texas at Brownsville		

Senior career*
Years	Team	Apps	(Gls)
2009–2011	S.U. 1º Dezembro		
2011–2012	D.C. United (Reserves)		
2013–2015	Washington Spirit (Reserves)		
2015	Apollon Limassol		
2015	Vålerenga Fotball Damer		(0)
2016–2017	FC Neunkirch		(2)
2017–2018	Brescia	19	(2)
2018–2020	A.C. Milan	21	(0)
2020–2021	Sporting CP	6	(1)
2021–2024	Servette	27	(4)

International career^{‡}
2009–2012	Portugal U19	28	(4)
2012–	Portugal	58	(3)
- * Club domestic league appearances and goals as of 17 Feb 2023 ‡ National team caps and goals as of 17 Feb 2023

Mónica Soraia Amaral Mendes (born 16 June 1993) is a retired Portuguese football defender who last played for Servette in the Swiss Super League until the end of the 2023/2024 season. She is currently coaching the FC Sion Under 18 women's team.

== Club career ==
Mendes has played in her native Portugal for S.U. 1º Dezembro before moving to the United States, where she played in college for the University of Texas at Brownsville and in the USL W-League for the reserve teams of D.C. United / Washington Spirit.

In August 2015, she played the 2015–16 UEFA Women's Champions League qualifying round for Cyprus club Apollon Limassol. During the same month, shortly after the end of Apollon's Champions League campaign, Mendes was playing for Vålerenga Fotball in the Norwegian Toppserien.

In February 2016, she signed with FC Neunkirch of the Swiss Nationalliga A.

== International career ==
Mendes has played for both Portugal women's national football team (senior) and the under-19 team.

== Honours ==
1º Dezembro

- Campeonato Nacional de Futebol Feminino: 2009–10, 2010–11, 2011–12
