= Furtuna Velaj =

Kosovan–Albanian footballer

Personal information
- Full name: Furtuna Velaj
- Date of birth: 8 March 1990 (age 36)
- Place of birth: Gllogjan, SFR Yugoslavia
- Height: 1.64 m (5 ft 5 in)
- Position: Midfielder

College career
Years	Team	Apps	(Gls)
2008–2012	Quinnipiac Bobcats	63	(39)

Senior career*
Years	Team	Apps	(Gls)
2012	Boston Breakers	0	(0)
2012	Afturelding	5	(1)
2013	Toronto Lady Lynx	9	(4)
2013	PK-35 Vantaa	11	(7)
2014	Kolbotn IL	8	(5)
2015	SC Sand		
2015	SC Sand II	13	(20)
2016	SC Sand	10	(2)
2017	NY Surf	9	(5)

International career^{‡}
2011–	Albania	25	(8)
- * Club domestic league appearances and goals ‡ National team caps and goals as of 6 April 2017

Furtuna Velaj (born 8 March 1990) is a Kosovan-born Albanian footballer who plays as a midfielder for the Albania national team.

== Club career ==
Velaj played for four years at Quinnipiac University, scoring 39 goals in 63 appearances and receiving many conference and regional accolades. After graduation, Velaj joined Boston Breakers in the WPSL as a forward winger, but missed the season due to an injury. Her team was the 2012 WPSL regular-season champions.

Velaj continued overseas, first joining Afturelding in Iceland for the second half of the Icelandic Urvalsdeild. Velaj tried to return to play in the new NWSL league as a trialist with the Portland Thorns, but did not make the squad and settled for the amateur team, Toronto Lady Lynx in the USL W-League.

After a good season for Lady Lynx she signed a contract from the former Finnish champions and was meant as a reinforce before the UEFA Women's Champions League. She made her debut in the 4–1 loss against Åland United on 27 July 2013, where she came in as a substitute. After finishing the season in Finland at second place and winning the 2013 Finnish Cup with her team, she transferred to Kolbotn IL in the Norwegian Toppserie at the beginning of 2014.

Velaj played for Albania in Sarpsborg, Norway in late 2013, and shortly afterwards she signed a contract with the Norwegian club Kolbotn IL. She received a shoulder injury playing for the club at La Manga.

After a successful season with Kolbotn IL she transferred to German club SC Sand, where she played for the first and second team. Velaj helped SC Sand II win the Sud Regional Championship, helping the team get promoted to 2nd Bundesliga in 2015 and finishing as top goalscorer in the league with 20 goals. Velaj played one season with the 2nd team and two half season with the first team.

== International career ==
Velaj helped the Albania national team qualify twice in the world cup preliminary qualifiers in Malta and to advance to the UEFA World Cup group stage in 2013 and 2017. She is the top goal scorer for the Albanian Women's National team with 6 goals and 2 assists. She has featured for Albania 21 times. Her first stint as captain came in 2016 in the last match of the UEFA European group stage qualifiers against France.

== See also ==
- List of Albania women's international footballers
