= Lorca Van De Putte =

Belgian footballer

Lorca van de Putte
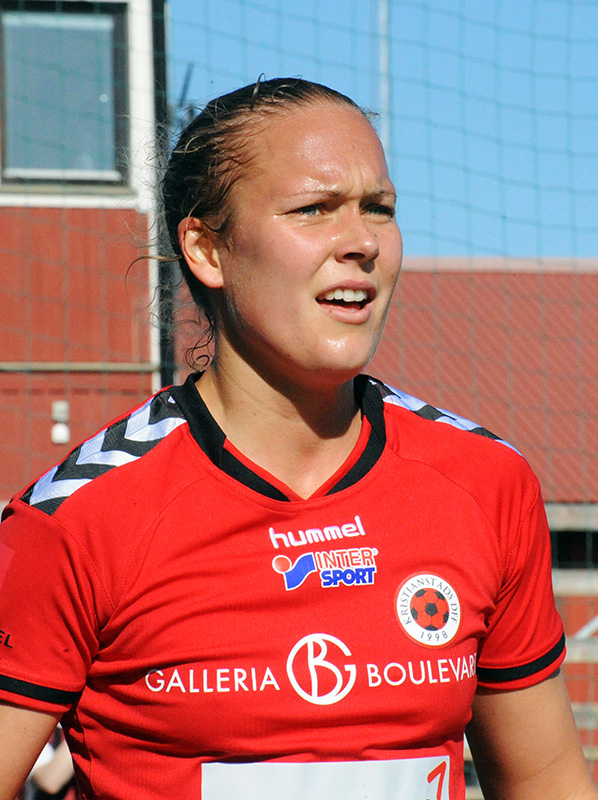
- Van De Putte in 2014

Personal information
- Full name: Lorca van de Putte
- Date of birth: 3 April 1988 (age 38)
- Place of birth: Lokeren, Belgium
- Height: 1.70 m (5 ft 7 in)
- Position: Defender

Senior career*
Years	Team	Apps	(Gls)
2002–2007	Sinaai Girls		
2007–2012	FC Twente	90	(2)
2012–2013	Anderlecht	17	(0)
2013–2017	Kristianstads DFF	76	(1)
2017–2018	Bristol City W.F.C.	1	(0)

International career^{‡}
2009–2017	Belgium	55	(2)
- * Club domestic league appearances and goals as of 22 July 2015 ‡ National team caps and goals as of 20 September 2016

Lorca Van De Putte (born 3 April 1988) is a Belgian former football defender. She played for Belgian clubs Sinaai Girls and Anderlecht, Dutch club Twente in the Eredivisie and also represented them in the UEFA Champions League, Swedish club Kristianstads DFF, and English club Bristol City in the Women's Super League. She also played internationally for the Belgian national team.

== Club career ==
Van De Putte started her football career, playing for the boys team of SK Lokeren-Doorslaar, before joining Sinaai Girls where she transitioned to the first team.

Van De Putte played for Twente from 2007 when the Eredivisie league started. During her time with the club, she played 90 matches, in which she scored one goal. With the club she won the KNVB Cup in 2008 and the Dutch Eredivisie in 2011. She also played in the UEFA Champions League with Twente.

In May 2012, Van De Putte returned to her native Belgium to enable her to continue her criminology studies in Ghent. She signed with BeNe League club Anderlecht.

In 2013, Van De Putte joined Swedish club Kristianstads DFF on a short-term contract. During her time at the club, she made 76 appearances and scored once, and was a well-known figure in Kristianstad, learneing to speak Swedish by herself.

In September 2017, Van De Putte joined English club Bristol City, with coach Willie Kirk saying he relied on past footage due to her picking up an injury. In 2018, following a knee injury, she retired from football.

== International career ==
Van De Putte played internationally for the Belgian national team, playing 55 games between 2009 and 2017. She played her milestone 50th cap in November 2016 against the Netherlands, where she saw former teammates from Twente.

== Style of play ==
Van De Putte is considered a left-back who can play a number of roles on the pitch and is physically fit and technically capable. She is noted her kicking technique, accurate crosses, and many rushes up the left wing.

== Personal life ==
In July 2021, Van De Putte became a mother, giving birth to a baby girl.
