= Ezmiralda Franja =

Albanian football defender (born 1997)

Personal information
- Full name: Ezmiralda Franja
- Date of birth: 4 February 1997 (age 29)
- Place of birth: Albania
- Position: Defender

Team information
- Current team: Volos F.C.

Senior career*
| Years | Team | Apps | (Gls) |
| 2013–2014 | KF Ada Velipojë | 24 | (0) |
| 2014–2025 | KF Vllaznia Shkodër | 220 | (102) |
| 2025 | Mitrovica | | |
| 2025–2026 | Ünye | 23 | (4) |
| 2026– | Volos | | |

International career^{‡}
| 2013–2015 | Albania U19 | 5 | (1) |
| 2014– | Albania | 49 | (0) |
- * Club domestic league appearances and goals as of 6 August 2026 ‡ National team caps and goals as of 5 October 2025

Ezmiralda Franja (born 4 February 1997) is an Albanian football defender who plays for Volos in the Greek A Division. She has been a member of the Albania women's national team as well as the Albania U19 squad.

== Club career ==
Franja was part of the Vllaznia team that won its first trophy in women's football in September 2014. The girls from Shkodra were declared the winners of the Albanian Cup.

In September 2025, she moved to Turkey, and joined Ünye in the Turkish Super League .

== See also ==
- List of Albania women's international footballers
