= Regina Pereira =

Portuguese footballer

Personal information
- Full name: Regina Carvalho Pereira
- Date of birth: 13 August 1992 (age 34)
- Place of birth: Barcelos, Portugal
- Height: 1.69 m (5 ft 7 in)
- Position: Defender

Team information
- Current team: Famalicão

Senior career*
Years	Team	Apps	(Gls)
2010–2014	Vilaverdense		
2014–2017	Valadares Gaia		
2017–2021	Braga	64	(3)
2021–	Famalicão	32	(4)

International career^{‡}
2008–2011	Portugal U19	21	(0)
2010–2015	Portugal	39	(1)
- * Club domestic league appearances and goals as of 17 Feb 2023 ‡ National team caps and goals as of 17 Feb 2023

Regina Carvalho Pereira (born 13 August 1992) is a Portuguese football defender who plays for Famalicão and the Portugal women's national football team.
