= Filipa Rodrigues =

Portuguese footballer

Personal information
- Full name: Vanessa Filipa Santos Rodrigues
- Date of birth: 4 September 1993 (age 33)
- Place of birth: Mangualde, Portugal
- Height: 1.76 m (5 ft 9 in)
- Position: Defender

Team information
- Current team: Estoril
- Number: 8

Senior career*
Years	Team	Apps	(Gls)
2012–2013	Fundação Laura Santos		
2013–2016	Atlético Ouriense	3	(1)
2016–2018	Estoril	38	(7)
2018–2019	Benfica	10	(2)

International career^{‡}
2011–2012	Portugal U19	25	(2)
2011–2015	Portugal	13	(3)
- * Club domestic league appearances and goals as of 24 June 2019 ‡ National team caps and goals as of 3 April 2015

Vanessa Filipa Santos Rodrigues (born 4 September 1993), known as Filipa Rodrigues or Pipa, is a Portuguese professional footballer who plays as a defender for the Portugal women's national team.

== Honours ==
Atlético Ouriense

- Campeonato Nacional Feminino: 2013–14

Benfica

- Campeonato Nacional II Divisão Feminino: 2018–19
- Taça de Portugal: 2018–19
