= Estádio Municipal de Abrantes =

Multi-purpose stadium in Abrantes, Portugal

- Interactive map of Estádio Municipal de Abrantes
- Location: Abrantes, Santarém District, Portugal
- Coordinates: 39.458896°N 8.215494°W
- Surface: grass

Construction
- Opened: 2005

Estádio Municipal de Abrantes (English: Abrantes Municipal Stadium) is a Portuguese multi-purpose stadium, adapted to football, rugby union and athletics, inaugurated in 2005.

The sports complex where the stadium is located also has a baseball park, the first in Portugal specially dedicated to the sport of baseball.
