= Albania women's national football team =

Women's national association football team representing Albania

Albania
- Nickname(s): Kuqezinjtë (The Red and Blacks)
- Association: Federata Shqiptare e Futbollit (FSHF)
- Confederation: UEFA (Europe)
- Head coach: Armir Grimaj
- Captain: Albina Rrahmani
- Most caps: Megi Doçi (70)
- Top scorer: Megi Doçi (23)
- Home stadium: Arena Kombëtare
- FIFA code: ALB
First colours	Second colours	Third colours

FIFA ranking
- Current: 68 ▼1 (20 October 2026)
- Highest: 59 (December 2013)
- Lowest: 81 (December 2015)

First international
- Albania 1–0 Macedonia (Pogradec, Albania; 5 May 2011)

Biggest win
- Albania 5–0 Armenia (Tirana, Albania; 21 October 2021)

Biggest defeat
- Albania 0–11 Norway (Durrës, Albania; 13 September 2014)

The Albania women's national football team (Albanian: Kombëtarja e futbollit të femrave të Shqipërisë) represents the country of Albania in international football and is controlled by the Albanian Football Association which is headquartered in the city of Tirana. The team is affiliated with UEFA and competes in the two major professional tournaments, the FIFA World Cup and the UEFA European Championship.

Women's football was long met with skepticism in Albania, and the first recorded tournament took place as late as 2007, before the FSHF formed the Albanian Women's National Championship in 2009, which is the only women's league in the country. The rise in popularity of the sport among women led to the formation of the Albania national team on 5th May, 2011, and they made their debut in a friendly match against Macedonia that ended in a 1–0 win. The current head coach is Armir Grimaj, replacing Altin Rraklli who was in charge from the formation in 2011 until 2016.

== History ==
The Albanian women's national football team was formed in 2011 and made their debut in a friendly against Macedonia FYR on 5 May 2011 at the Gjorgji Kyçyku Stadium. The match ended 1–0 with Albania's first win and midfielder Aurora Seranaj scoring the first goal for Albania. The national team ended the year with their second win against Macedonia FYR away in Struga.

On 15 May 2012, Albania faced Montenegro in Bar and won 4–2. Three days later, the Albanian team won again with a rematch against Montenegro, winning 4–3 at the Loro Boriçi Stadium in Shkodër. On 22 May, Albania encountered Macedonia FYR again, winning 2–0 with 2 goals from Suada Jashari. The national team had so far been undefeated in 5 games, with 15 goals scored, and 6 goals conceded. On 29 August, The Albania national team participated in an unofficial football tournament held in Drama. The national team drew 1–1 with Amazons Drama and lost 0–3 to Greece.

Albania's early progress stalled over the following seasons. During 2015 FIFA Women's World Cup qualifying, Albania finished bottom of a six-team group, winning just once in ten matches (1–0–9, 3 goals for, 54 against), including their heaviest ever defeat, 0–11 away to Norway in Durrës on 13 September 2014. Albania continued to compete in every subsequent World Cup and European Championship qualifying cycle without reaching a final tournament, generally finishing in the lower half of their groups throughout the 2017 and 2022 Euro qualifying campaigns and the 2019 and 2023 World Cup qualifying campaigns.

Albania's fortunes improved with the introduction of the UEFA Women's Nations League-linked qualifying format ahead of UEFA Women's Euro 2025. Seeded into League C, the lowest of the three qualifying tiers, Albania topped a three-team group (Group 5) during the 2024 league phase, securing promotion to League B for the following Nations League cycle alongside Belarus, Greece, Romania and Slovenia. As group winners, Albania entered the first round of the Euro 2025 qualifying play-offs, where they were eliminated by Norway, losing 0–5 away and 0–5 at home for a 0–9 aggregate defeat.

Despite the play-off exit, the promotion out of League C represented Albania's best showing in a UEFA Women's Euro qualifying cycle to date, and carried them into League B of the 2025 UEFA Women's Nations League. In the resulting League B campaign Albania faced Czechia and Ukraine, before entering the promotion/relegation play-offs against Cyprus in October 2025, which Albania won 5–3 on aggregate (a 3–0 home win in the second leg followed a 2–3 away defeat in the first) to retain their League B status.

As of mid-2026, Albania are competing in 2027 FIFA Women's World Cup qualification, having been drawn against the Czech Republic and Montenegro among others, with matches against both sides played in June 2026 under head coach Armir Grimaj.

== Team image ==
=== Kits and crest ===
==== Kit suppliers ====
Kit provider	Period
(Italy) Legea	2011
(Germany) Adidas	2011–2016
(Italy) Macron	2016–present

=== Home stadium ===
The Elbasan Arena is currently the national stadium of the Albania women's national football team. The first home match in the country was played in the Gjorgji Kyçyku Stadium of Pogradec in May 2011. Following the completion, the National Arena in Tirana will be the home venue of both the men's and women's national team.

In November 2013, Qemal Stafa Stadium was shut down by FIFA for not fulfilling international standards. During the period of friendly games and the Euro qualifier with Greece in 2015, the women's team used the Loni Papuçiu Stadium in Fier to hold their matches. The Qemal Stafa Stadium held the match between France and Albania on 27 November 2015.

== Results and fixtures ==
This Is the schedule of past & upcoming games for the Albania women's football team.

Legend

Win Draw Lose Fixture

=== 2025 ===
28 November Friendly	Albania	1-1	Turkey	Antalya, Turkey
	Topçu 50'		Hilaj 20'

1 December 2025 Friendly	Turkey	2–0	Albania	Istanbul, Turkey
19:00	Şeker 14'; Altunkulak 81'			Stadium: THY Fielad; Referee: Lutfaliyeva (AZE), Nuriyeva(AZE), Akbarzada (AZE)

=== 2026 ===
3 March 2027 FIFA Women's World Cup qualification	Montenegro	1–2	Albania	Nikšić, Montenegro
14:00	Kuč 67'	Report (FIFA); Report (UEFA)	Doçi 70', 76'	Stadium: Gradski stadion Referee: Miriama Bočková (Slovakia)

7 March 2027 FIFA Women's World Cup qualification	Albania	1–5	Czech Republic	Shkodër, Albania
18:00	F. Berisha 18'	Report (FIFA); Report (UEFA)	Cvrčková 14', 68'; Khýrová 37', 62'; Černá 50'	Stadium: Loro Boriçi Stadium; Attendance: 743; Referee: Lotta Vuorio (Finland)

14 April 2027 FIFA Women's World Cup qualification	Wales	4–0	Albania	Wrexham, Wales
20:15	Cain 15', 55'; E. Hughes 35'; Roberts 48'	Report (FIFA); Report (UEFA)		Stadium: Racecourse Ground; Attendance: 4,485; Referee: Katalin Sipos (Hungary)

18 April 2027 FIFA Women's World Cup qualification	Albania	0–1	Wales	Elbasan, Albania
18:00		Report (FIFA); Report (UEFA)	Roberts 28'	Stadium: Elbasan Arena; Attendance: 538; Referee: Lizzy van der Helm (Netherlands)

5 June 2027 FIFA Women's World Cup qualification	Czech Republic	1–1	Albania	Prague, Czech Republic
17:30	Cahynová 47'	Report (FIFA); Report (UEFA)	Levendi 70'	Stadium: FK Viktoria Stadion; Attendance: 1,453; Referee: Franziska Wildfeuer (Germany)

9 June 2027 FIFA Women's World Cup qualification	Albania	5−2	Montenegro	Shkodër, Albania
19:00	Doçi 24' (pen.), 63'; F. Berisha 45+4'; G. Berisha 68'; Bajraktari 70'	Report (FIFA); Report (UEFA)	Dešić 20'; Djoković 45'	Stadium: Loro Boriçi Stadium; Referee: Emily Heaslip (England)

9 October 2027 FIFA Women's World Cup play-offs	Albania	0–1	Wales	Shkodër, Albania
18:00 CET		Report	Franja 22' (o.g.)	Stadium: Loro Boriçi Stadium; Attendance: 642; Referee: Eleni Antoniou (Greece)

13 October 2027 FIFA Women's World Cup play-offs	Wales	3–0	Albania	Llanelli, Wales
19:15 BST	Davies 34'; Hughes 50'; Cain 62'	Report		Stadium: Parc y Scarlets; Attendance: 4,837; Referee: Ionela Alina Pesu (Romania)

28 November Yongchuan International Tournament	Malawi	–	Albania	Chongqing, China
15:00 UTC+8				Stadium: Yongchuan Sports Center

1 December Yongchuan International Tournament	China	–	Albania	Chongqing, China
19:35 UTC+8				Stadium: Yongchuan Sports Center

4 December Yongchuan International Tournament	Albania	–	Thailand	Chongqing, China
15:00 UTC+8				Stadium: Yongchuan Sports Center

=== 2027 ===
2 March 2027 UEFA Women's Nations League	Albania	–	Romania	Albania
		Report

6 March 2027 UEFA Women's Nations League	Albania	–	Serbia	Albania
		Report

20 April 2027 UEFA Women's Nations League	Serbia	–	Albania	Serbia
		Report

24 April 2027 UEFA Women's Nations League	Albania	–	Belgium	Albania
		Report

11 June 2027 UEFA Women's Nations League	Belgium	–	Albania	Belgium
		Report

15 June 2027 UEFA Women's Nations League	Romania	–	Albania	Romania
		Report

== Coaching staff ==
=== Current coaching staff ===
Position	Name	Ref.
Head coach	(Albania) Armir Grimaj	
Assistant coach	(Albania) Luçije Gjini	
Fitness coach	(Greece) Nikiforos Vieros	
Goalkeeping coach	(Albania) Elis Ligataj	
Video analyst	(Albania) Xhoen Tugu	
Doctor	(Albania) Genta Nallbani	
Physiotherapist	(Albania) Selime Mustafaj	
Physiotherapist	(Albania) Aisel Oseku	

=== Manager history ===
As of 9 June 2026

Manager	Tenure	P	W	D	L	Win %
(Albania) Altin Rraklli	5 May 2011 – 22 April 2016	30	10	1	19	33.3
(Albania) Armir Grimaj	22 April 2016–present	76	23	8	45	30.3

== Players ==
=== Current squad ===
The following players were called up for the 2027 FIFA Women's World Cup qualification matches against Czech Republic and Montenegro on 5 and 9 June 2026, respectively.

- Caps and goals are correct as of 9 June 2026, after the match against Montenegro.

No.	Pos.	Player	Date of birth (age)	Caps	Goals	Club
1	GK	Antigona Hyska	23 June 2003 (age 23)	12	0	(Albanian Football Federation) KFF Gramshi
12	GK	Rajmonda Spahiu	25 March 2006 (age 20)	8	0	(Football Federation of Kosovo) Mitrovica
23	GK	Klesjana Spaho	10 May 2004 (age 22)	0	0	(Albanian Football Federation) Teuta
2	DF	Armera Tukaj	25 May 2001 (age 25)	24	0	(Turkish Football Federation) Trabzonspor
3	DF	Arbenita Curraj	28 July 1996 (age 30)	43	0	(Italian Football Federation) Genoa
4	DF	Aglia Iliadhi	30 November 2004 (age 21)	1	0	(German Football Association) Wacker Mecklenbeck
5	DF	Arbiona Bajraktari	10 September 1996 (age 30)	35	2	(Albanian Football Federation) Vllaznia
13	DF	Rexhina Maxhalaku	4 February 2005 (age 21)	2	0	(Albanian Football Federation) Teuta
15	DF	Nora Dedgjonaj	14 September 1999 (age 27)	2	0	(Albanian Football Federation) KFF Gramshi
19	DF	Xhesika Ndoj	20 July 2007 (age 19)	6	0	(Albanian Football Federation) KFF Gramshi
20	DF	Klea Hamonikaj	28 May 2003 (age 23)	16	1	(Albanian Football Federation) Apolonia Fier
21	DF	Alma Hilaj	2 February 2000 (age 26)	39	2	(Italian Football Federation) Genoa
6	MF	Vanesa Levenaj	10 August 2001 (age 25)	7	1	(Turkish Football Federation) Giresun Sanayispor
8	MF	Eriola Delija	16 August 2005 (age 21)			(Swiss Football Association) Aarau
10	MF	Gresa Berisha	26 April 1998 (age 28)	18	1	(Football Federation of Kosovo) Mitrovica
11	MF	Megi Doçi (captain)	14 October 1996 (age 30)	59	21	(Albanian Football Federation) Vllaznia
14	MF	Ezmiralda Franja	4 February 1997 (age 29)	59	0	(Turkish Football Federation) Ünye Kadın
16	MF	Ilarja Zarka	1 October 2001 (age 25)	16	0	(Turkish Football Federation) Ünye Kadın
18	MF	Sara Begallo	1 March 2000 (age 26)	10	1	(Turkish Football Federation) Ünye Kadın
22	MF	Mikaela Metalla	22 October 2002 (age 24)	17	0	(Albanian Football Federation) Teuta
7	FW	Fortesa Berisha	19 June 2003 (age 23)	22	10	(Italian Football Federation) Como
9	FW	Valenita Troka	15 November 2002 (age 24)	23	0	(Turkish Football Federation) Trabzonspor
17	FW	Esi Lufo	10 September 2001 (age 25)	14	1	(Albanian Football Federation) Vllaznia

=== Recent call-ups ===
- The following players have been called up for a squad within the last 12 months and are still available for selection.

Pos.	Player	Date of birth (age)	Caps	Goals		Latest call-up
GK	Viona Rexhepi	24 July 1996 (age 30)	31	0	(Kosovo) Mitrovica	v. Cyprus, 28 October 2025
DF	Sara Maliqi	9 October 1995 (age 31)	40	0	(Turkey) Ünye Kadın	v. Cyprus, 28 October 2025
MF	Erjona Emërllahu	20 July 2001 (age 25)			(Kosovo) Mitrovica	v. Cyprus, 28 October 2025
MF	Mimoza Hamidi	28 April 1998 (age 28)	18	2	(Switzerland) FC Thun Berner Oberland	v. Cyprus, 28 October 2025
FW	Florentina Kuqi	26 March 2004 (age 22)	7	0	(Norway) Sarpsborg 08	v. Cyprus, 28 October 2025
FW	Kristina Maksuti	6 February 1993 (age 33)	35	5	(Portugal) Famalicão	v. Cyprus, 28 October 2025

- As of 17 September 2026

== Records ==
As of 17 September 2026

=== Most capped players ===
#	Player	Caps	Goals
1	Megi Doçi	59	21
1	Ezmiralda Franja	59	0
3	Qëndresa Krasniqi	50	7
4	Luçije Gjini	49	4
5	Arbenita Curraj	43	0
6	Sara Maliqi	40	0
7	Alma Hilaj	39	2
8	Kristina Maksuti	35	5
8	Arbiona Bajraktari	35	2
10	Albina Rrahmani	31	1
10	Viona Rexhepi	31	0

=== Top goalscorers ===
#	Player	Goals	Caps	Avg.
1	Megi Doçi	21	59	0.36
2	Fortesa Berisha	10	22	0.45
3	Qëndresa Krasniqi	7	50	0.14
4	Kristina Maksuti	5	35	0.14
4	Furtuna Velaj	5	19	0.26
4	Luçije Gjini	4	49	0.08
7	Alma Hilaj	2	39	0.05
7	Arbiona Bajraktari	2	35	0.06
7	Suada Jashari	2	20	0.10
7	Mimoza Hamidi	2	18	0.11

== Competitive record ==
=== FIFA Women's World Cup ===
FIFA Women's World Cup record									Qualification record							
Year	Result	Pld	W	D *	L	GF	GA	GD	Position	Pld	W	D	L	GF	GA	GD
(China) 1991	Team did not exist								Team did not exist							
(Sweden) 1995	Team did not exist								Team did not exist							
(United States) 1999	Team did not exist								Team did not exist							
(United States) 2003	Team did not exist								Team did not exist							
(China) 2007	Team did not exist								Team did not exist							
(Germany) 2011	Team did not exist								Team did not exist							
(Canada) 2015	Did not qualify								6/6	13	3	1	9	8	56	−48
(France) 2019	Did not qualify								4/5	11	3	2	6	9	25	−16
(Australia) (New Zealand) 2023	Did not qualify								4/6	10	3	1	6	14	30	−16
(Brazil) 2027	To be determined								To be determined							
(Costa Rica) (Jamaica) (Mexico) (United States) 2031	To be determined								To be determined							
(United Kingdom) 2035	To be determined								To be determined							
Total	0/6	–	–	–	–	–	–	–	Total	24	9	4	21	31	101	−70

*Draws include knockout matches decided on penalty kicks.

=== UEFA Women's Championship ===
UEFA Women's Championship record									Qualification record									
Year	Result	Pld	W	D*	L	GF	GA	GD	Position	Pld	W	D*	L	GF	GA	GD	P/R	Rnk
1984	Team did not exist								Team did not exist									
(Norway) 1987	Team did not exist								Team did not exist									
(Germany) 1989	Team did not exist								Team did not exist									
(Denmark) 1991	Team did not exist								Team did not exist									
(Italy) 1993	Team did not exist								Team did not exist									
(Germany) 1995	Team did not exist								Team did not exist									
(Norway) 1997	Team did not exist								Team did not exist									
(Germany) 2001	Team did not exist								Team did not exist									
(England) 2005	Team did not exist								Team did not exist									
(Finland) 2009	Team did not exist								Team did not exist									
(Sweden) 2013	Did not enter								Did not enter									
(Netherlands) 2017	Did not qualify								5/5	8	0	0	8	3	31	−28	–	
(England) 2021	Did not qualify								4/5	8	2	0	6	7	21	−14	–	
(Switzerland) 2025	Did not qualify								1/4	6	3	0	3	8	18	−10	▲ (Note: From Euro 2025 onwards a new qualifying format was introduced, linked to the Women's Nations League where teams are divided into leagues with promotion/relegation between the leagues at the end of each cycle.)	37th
2029	To be determined								To be determined									
Total	0/5	–	–	–	–	–	–	–	Total	22	5	0	17	18	70	−52	37th	

=== UEFA Women's Nations League ===
UEFA Women's Nations League record
Year	League	Group	Pos	Pld	W	D	L	GF	GA	P/R	Rnk
2023–24	B	1	4th	6	0	1	5	2	18	▼	32nd
2025	B	4	To be determined								
Total				6	0	1	5	2	18	32nd	

▲	Promoted at end of season
Same position	No movement at end of season
▼	Relegated at end of season
*	Participated in promotion/relegation play-offs

== Head-to-head record ==
As of 5 August 2021

Opponent	Games	Wins	Draws	Losses	Goals For	Goals Against	Goal Differential
Belgium	2	0	0	2	0	8	−8
Croatia	2	0	0	2	2	10	−8
Finland	2	0	0	2	1	11	−11
France	2	0	0	2	0	12	−12
Greece	5	2	0	3	6	12	−6
Hungary	1	0	0	1	0	6	−6
Kosovo	1	1	0	0	3	2	−1
Latvia	1	1	0	0	2	0	+2
Luxembourg	2	2	0	0	4	2	+2
North Macedonia	4	3	0	1	10	5	+5
Malta	2	0	2	0	1	1	0
Montenegro	3	2	0	1	8	6	+2
Netherlands	2	0	0	2	1	14	−13
Norway	2	0	0	2	0	18	−18
Portugal	3	0	0	3	1	11	−10
Poland	2	0	1	1	2	5	−3
Romania	2	0	0	2	0	6	−6
Turkey	2	1	0	1	1	1	0
Ukraine	2	0	0	2	0	6	−6
19 Countries	41	11	3	27	39	134	−95

== See also ==
- Sport in Albania
  - Football in Albania
    - Women's football in Albania
- Albania women's national football team
  - Albania women's national football team results
  - List of Albania women's international footballers
- Albania women's national under-19 football team
- Albania women's national under-17 football team
