= England women's national football team results (2010–2019) =

- Win Draw Loss

This is a list of the England women's national football team results from 2010 to 2019.

== Results ==
=== 2010 ===
24 February 2010 2010 Cyprus Cup group	England	1–0	South Africa	Larnaca, Cyprus
	J. Scott 5'			Stadium: GSZ Stadium

27 February 2010 2010 Cyprus Cup group	England	0–1	Canada	Larnaca, Cyprus
			Julien 10'	Stadium: Alpha Sports Centre

1 March 2010 2010 Cyprus Cup group	England	2–2	Switzerland	Nicosia, Cyprus
	Stoney 56'; Sanderson 76'		Dickenmann 27', 84'	Stadium: GSP Stadium; Referee: Katalin Kulcsár (Hungary)

3 March 2010 2010 Cyprus Cup 5th place	England	3–2	Italy	Nicosia, Cyprus
	A. Scott 10', 58'; White 90'	Report	Brown 44' (o.g.); Camporese 64'	Stadium: GSP Stadium

25 March 2010 2011 World Cup qualifying	England	3–0	Austria	London, England
	Sanderson 16'; Aluko 67'; White 90'	Report		Stadium: Loftus Road; Attendance: 3,980; Referee: Caroline De Boeck (Belgium)

1 April 2010 2011 World Cup qualifying	England	1–0	Spain	London, England
	Chapman 30'	Report		Stadium: The New Den; Attendance: 5,041; Referee: Christina Westrum Pedersen (Norway)

20 May 2010 2011 World Cup qualifying	Malta	0–6	England	Ta' Qali, Malta
		Report	White 7'; K. Smith 15'; F. Williams 29', 82'; Clarke 56'; White 67'	Stadium: Centenary Stadium; Referee: Marte Soro (Norway)

19 June 2010 2011 World Cup qualifying	Spain	2–2	England	Aranda de Duero, Spain
	Martín 16'; Bermúdez 67'	Report	Unitt 78'; F. White 88'	Stadium: Estadio El Montecillo; Attendance: 2,800; Referee: Jenny Palmqvist (Sweden)

29 July 2010 2011 World Cup qualifying	England	3–0	Turkey	Walsall, England
	Yankey 23'; E. White 62'; Clarke 78'	Report		Stadium: Bescot Stadium; Attendance: 5,457; Referee: Floarea Babadac-Ionescu (Romania)

21 August 2010 2011 World Cup qualifying	Austria	0–4	England	Krems an der Donau, Austria
		Report	K. Smith 7', 30'; A. Scott 40'; E. White 80'	Stadium: Sepp-Doll-Stadion; Referee: Kirsi Heikkinen (Finland)

12 September 2010 2011 World Cup qualifying playoff first leg	England	2–0	Switzerland	Shrewsbury, England
	Williams 44'; K. Smith 45+2'	Report		Stadium: New Meadow; Attendance: 4,119; Referee: Claudine Brohet (Belgium)

16 September 2010 2011 World Cup qualifying playoff second leg	Switzerland	2–3 (2–5 agg.)	England	Wohlen, Switzerland
	Bachmann 41'; Zumbühl 65'	Report	K. Smith 32'; Aluko 34'; Williams 50' (pen.)	Stadium: Stadion Niedermatten; Attendance: 1,800; Referee: Cristina Dorcioman (Romania)

19 October 2010 2010 Peace Queen Cup	England	0–0	South Korea	Suwon, South Korea
				Stadium: Suwon Civil Stadium; Referee: Pannipar Kamnueng (Thailand)

21 October 2010 2010 Peace Queen Cup	New Zealand	0–0	England	Suwon, South Korea
				Stadium: Suwon Civil Stadium

=== 2011 ===
2 March 2011 2011 Cyprus Cup group	England	2–0	Italy	Larnaca, Cyprus
	E.White 3'; K.Smith 38' (pen.)			Stadium: Neo GSZ Stadium

4 March 2011 2011 Cyprus Cup group	England	0–2	Scotland	Nicosia, Cyprus
			Little 26'; Beattie 52'	Stadium: GSP Stadium; Referee: Katalin Kulcsár (Hungary)

7 March 2011 2011 Cyprus Cup group	Canada	2–0	England	Nicosia, Cyprus
	Sinclair 45'; Timko 55'			Stadium: GSP Stadium

9 March 2011 2011 Cyprus Cup 5th place	England	2–0	South Korea	Dasaki Achna, Cyprus
	S. Smith 14', 80'			Stadium: Dasaki Stadium

2 April 2011 Friendly	England	2–1	United States	Leyton, England
	Clarke; Yankey	Report	Rapinoe	Stadium: Brisbane Road; Attendance: 5,801

17 May 2011 Friendly	England	2–0	Sweden	Oxford, England
	J. Scott; Carney	Report		Stadium: Kassam Stadium

27 June 2011 2011 World Cup group stage	Mexico	1–1	England	Wolfsburg, Germany
	Ocampo 33'	Report	Williams 21'	Stadium: Volkswagen-Arena; Attendance: 18,702; Referee: Silvia Reyes (Peru)

1 July 2011 2011 World Cup group stage	New Zealand	1–2	England	Dresden, Germany
	Gregorius 18'	Report	J. Scott 63'; Clarke 81'	Stadium: Rudolf-Harbig-Stadion; Attendance: 19,110; Referee: Thérèse Neguel (Cameroon)

5 July 2011 2011 World Cup group stage	England	2–0	Japan	Augsburg, Germany
	White 15'; Yankey 66'	Report		Stadium: Impuls Arena; Attendance: 20,777; Referee: Carol Anne Chenard (Canada)

9 July 2011 2011 World Cup quarter-final	England	1–1 (a.e.t.) (3–4 p)	France	Leverkusen, Germany
	J. Scott 59'	Report	Bussaglia 88'	Stadium: BayArena; Attendance: 26,395; Referee: Jenny Palmqvist (Sweden)
	Penalties
	Smith (penalty scored); Carney (penalty scored); Stoney (penalty scored); Rafferty (penalty missed); White (penalty missed)		(penalty missed) Abily; (penalty scored) Bussaglia; (penalty scored) Thiney; (penalty scored) Bompastor; (penalty scored) Le Sommer

17 September 2011 Euro 2013 qualifying	Serbia	2–2	England	Belgrade, Serbia
	Podovac 55'; Smiljković 90+4'	Report	Yankey 6'; Slović 19' (o.g.)	Stadium: Omladinski Stadium; Attendance: 200; Referee: Sandra Braz Bastos (Portugal)

22 September 2011 Euro 2013 qualifying	England	4–0	Slovenia	Swindon, England
	Yankey 1'; White 5'; Houghton 56'; Williams 88'	Report		Stadium: County Ground; Attendance: 3,878; Referee: Karolina Radzik-Johan (Poland)

27 October 2011 Euro 2013 qualifying	Netherlands	0–0	England	Zwolle, Netherlands
		Report		Stadium: Oosterenkstadion; Attendance: 8,800; Referee: Bibiana Steinhaus (Germany)

23 November 2011 Euro 2013 qualifying	England	2–0	Serbia	Doncaster, England
	Clarke 41'; White 51'	Report		Stadium: Keepmoat Stadium; Attendance: 4,112; Referee: Natalia Avdonchenko (Russia)

=== 2012 ===
28 February 2012 2012 Cyprus Cup group	England	3–1	Finland	Nicosia, Cyprus
	Smith 36' (pen.), 88' (pen.); Carney 50'		Tolvanen 8'	Stadium: GSP Stadium

1 March 2012 2012 Cyprus Cup group	Switzerland	0–1	England	Larnaca, Cyprus
			Williams 77'	Stadium: GSZ Stadium; Referee: Kirsi Heikkinen (Finland)

4 March 2012 2012 Cyprus Cup group	England	0–3	France	Paralimni, Cyprus
			Nécib 14'; Delie 49'; Thiney 80'	Stadium: Paralimni Stadium; Referee: Kirsi Heikkinen (Finland)

6 March 2012 2012 Cyprus Cup 3rd	England	1–3	Italy	Paralimni, Cyprus
	Moore 26'		Panico 59'; Conti 64'; Gabbiandini 86'	Stadium: Paralimni Stadium

31 March 2012 Euro 2013 qualifying	Croatia	0–6	England	Vrbovec, Croatia
		Report	Williams 4'; Clarke 15'; Unitt 18'; White 35'; Houghton 45', 68'	Stadium: Gradski stadion Attendance: 1,000; Referee: Petra Chudá (Slovakia)

17 June 2012 Euro 2013 qualifying	England	1–0	Netherlands	Salford, England
	Yankey 67'	Report		Stadium: Salford City Stadium; Attendance: 5,505; Referee: Jenny Palmqvist (Sweden)

21 June 2012 Euro 2013 qualifying	Slovenia	0–4	England	Velenje, Slovenia
		Report	Scott 29', 34'; Carney 54'; Williams 85'	Stadium: Ob Jezeru; Attendance: 800; Referee: Katalin Kulcsár (Hungary)

19 September 2012 Euro 2013 qualifying	England	3–0	Croatia	Walsall, England
	J. Scott 21'; Aluko 47'; Stoney 80'	Report		Stadium: Bescot Stadium; Attendance: 5,821; Referee: Esther Azzopardi (Malta)

20 October 2012 Friendly	France	2–2	England	Paris, France
	Delie 59', 83'	Report	Houghton 34'; Scott 39'	Stadium: Stade Sébastien Charléty; Attendance: 5,914; Referee: Silvia Tea Spinelli (Italy)

=== 2013 ===
6 March 2013 2013 Cyprus Cup group	England	4–2	Italy	Nicosia, Cyprus
	Nobbs 8'; Houghton 30'; Clarke 33'; E. White 84'		Camporese 17', 27'	Stadium: GSP Stadium

8 March 2013 2013 Cyprus Cup group	Scotland	4–4	England	Larnaca, Cyprus
	Evans 18'; Ross 49'; Little 51'; Mitchell 83'		E. White 40'; Duggan 45+1'; Williams 74'; Smith 78'	Stadium: GSZ Stadium

11 March 2013 2013 Cyprus Cup group	England	3–1	New Zealand	Larnaca, Cyprus
	White 71'; Aluko 72'; Duggan 90'		Hearn 7'	Stadium: GSZ Stadium

13 March 2013 2013 Cyprus Cup Final	England	1–0	Canada	Nicosia, Cyprus
	Yankey 70'	Report		Stadium: GSP Stadium

7 April 2013 Friendly	England	1–0	Canada	Rotherham, England
	White 90+'	Report		Stadium: New York Stadium; Attendance: 5,000

26 June 2013 Friendly	England	1–1	Japan	Burton upon Trent, England
	Aluko	Report	Kawasumi	Stadium: Pirelli Stadium; Attendance: 5,327

4 July 2013 Friendly	Sweden	4–1	England	Ljungskile, Sweden
	Göransson 29'; Schelin 33', 68'; Seger 51'	Report	White 13'	Stadium: Uddevalla Arena; Referee: Christine Baitinger (Germany)

12 July 2013 Euro 2013 group stage	England	2–3	Spain	Linköping, Sweden
	Aluko 8'; Bassett 89'	Report	Boquete 4'; Hermoso 85'; Putellas 90+3'	Stadium: Arena Linköping; Attendance: 5,190; Referee: Kateryna Monzul (Ukraine)

15 July 2013 Euro 2013 group stage	England	1–1	Russia	Linköping, Sweden
	Duggan 90+2'	Report	Korovkina 38'	Stadium: Arena Linköping; Attendance: 3,629; Referee: Bibiana Steinhaus (Germany)

18 July 2013 Euro 2013 group stage	France	3–0	England	Linköping, Sweden
	Le Sommer 9'; Nécib 62'; Renard 64'	Report		Stadium: Arena Linköping; Attendance: 7,332; Referee: Kirsi Heikkinen (Finland)

21 September 2013 2015 World Cup qualifying	England	6–0	Belarus	Bournemouth, England
	Carney 3', 26', 40'; White 13'; Dowie 60'; Aluko 62'	Report		Stadium: Dean Court; Attendance: 6,818; Referee: Riem Hussein (Germany)

26 September 2013 2015 World Cup qualifying	England	8–0	Turkey	Portsmouth, England
	Duggan 1', 2', 37'; White 30', 39'; Aluko 33', 49'; Dowie 75'	Report		Stadium: Fratton Park; Attendance: 6,293; Referee: Olga Zadinová (Czech Republic)

26 October 2013 2015 World Cup qualifying	England	2–0	Wales	London, England
	Nobbs 48'; Duggan 57'	Report		Stadium: The Den; Attendance: 5,764; Referee: Stéphanie Frappart (France)

31 October 2013 2015 World Cup qualifying	Turkey	0–4	England	Adana, Turkey
		Report	Aluko 10'; Williams 17' (pen.); Duggan 48'; Nobbs 60'	Stadium: Adana 5 Ocak Stadium; Attendance: 784; Referee: Yuliya Medvedeva-Keldyusheva (Kazakhstan)

=== 2014 ===
17 January 2014 Friendly	England	1–1	Norway	La Manga, Spain
	Aluko	Report	Bjaneso	Stadium: La Manga Stadium; Referee: Elia Maria Martinez (Spain)

5 March 2014 2014 Cyprus Cup group	England	2–0	Italy	Larnaca, Cyprus
	Carney 45' (pen.); Duggan 62'	Report		Stadium: Ammochostos Stadium; Referee: Elia Maria Martinez (Spain)

7 March 2014 2014 Cyprus Cup group	Finland	0–3	England	Larnaca, Cyprus
			Asante 31'; Bonner 67'; Aluko 72'	Stadium: GSZ Stadium

10 March 2014 2014 Cyprus Cup group	England	2–0	Canada	Nicosia, Cyprus
	Sanderson 2', 33'	Report		Stadium: GSP Stadium

12 March 2014 2014 Cyprus Cup Final	England	0–2	France	Nicosia, Cyprus
		Report	Thiney 6'; Abily 18'	Stadium: GSP Stadium

5 April 2014 2015 World Cup qualifying	England	9–0	Montenegro	Brighton and Hove, England
	Duggan 2', 13', 71'; Aluko 37'; J. Scott 40'; Carney 49'; Sanderson 55'; Stokes 69'; Dowie 84'	Report		Stadium: Falmer Stadium; Attendance: 8,908; Referee: Elia Martinez (Spain)

8 May 2014 2015 World Cup qualifying	England	4–0	Ukraine	Shrewsbury, England
	Dowie 41', 53'; Aluko 49', 63'	Report		Stadium: New Meadow; Attendance: 5,880; Referee: Sara Persson (Sweden)

14 June 2014 2015 World Cup qualifying	Belarus	0–3	England	Minsk, Belarus
		Report	Aluko 31'; Houghton 36'; Bronze 90+5'	Stadium: Traktor Stadium; Attendance: 350; Referee: Jana Adámková (Czech Republic)

19 June 2014 2015 World Cup qualifying	Ukraine	1–2	England	Lviv, Ukraine
	Ovdiychuk 63'	Report	Stoney 11'; Aluko 14'	Stadium: Arena Lviv; Attendance: 3,757; Referee: Cristina Dorcioman (Romania)

3 August 2014 Friendly	England	4–0	Sweden	Hartlepool, England
	Carney 36', 80'; Kirby 53'; Sanderson 68'	Report		Stadium: Victoria Park; Attendance: 4,547; Referee: Sjoukje De Jong (Netherlands)

21 August 2014 2015 World Cup qualifying	Wales	0–4	England	Cardiff, Wales
		Report	Carney 16'; Aluko 39'; Bassett 44'; Sanderson 45'	Stadium: Cardiff City Stadium; Attendance: 3,581; Referee: Efthalia Mitsi (Greece)

17 September 2014 2015 World Cup qualifying	Montenegro	0–10	England	Petrovac, Montenegro
		Report	Aluko 8', 31', 64'; Carney 22', 51'; Bronze 27'; Duggan 56', 90+4'; Greenwood 90'; Potter 90+3'	Stadium: Stadion Pod Malim Brdom; Attendance: 300; Referee: Petra Chudá (Slovakia)

23 November 2014 Friendly	England	0–3	Germany	London, England
		Report	J. Scott 6' (o.g.); Šašić 12', 45'	Stadium: Wembley Stadium; Attendance: 45,619; Referee: Esther Staubli (Switzerland)

=== 2015 ===
13 February 2015 Friendly	England	0–1	United States	Milton Keynes, England
		Report	Morgan 25'	Stadium: Stadium MK; Attendance: 14,369; Referee: Sandra Bastos (Portugal)

4 March 2015 2015 Cyprus Cup group	Finland	1–3	England	Larnaca, Cyprus
	Saari 89' (pen.)	Report	Sanderson 21'; Aluko 66'; Clarke 83'	Stadium: GSZ Stadium; Referee: Elia María Martínez (Spain)

6 March 2015 2015 Cyprus Cup group	Australia	0–3	England	Nicosia, Cyprus
		Report	Taylor 8', 17', 83'	Stadium: GSP Stadium

9 March 2015 2015 Cyprus Cup group	Netherlands	1–1	England	Nicosia, Cyprus
	Miedema 19'	Report	Aluko 43'	Stadium: GSP Stadium

11 March 2015 2015 Cyprus Cup Final	England	1–0	Canada	Larnaca, Cyprus
18:30 EET (UTC+2)	Rafferty (yellow card) 59'; Sanderson 67'; Taylor (yellow card) 88'	Report	Leon (yellow card) 31'; Chapman (yellow card) 81'; Beckie (yellow card) 85'	Stadium: GSZ Stadium; Attendance: 100

9 April 2015 Friendly	England	2–1	China	Manchester, England
19:30 BST (UTC+1)	Taylor 1'; Kirby 10'	Report	Shanshan 17'	Stadium: Academy Stadium; Attendance: 5,665; Referee: Morag Pirie (Scotland)

30 May 2015 Friendly	Canada	1–0	England	Hamilton, Canada
19:00 PDT (UTC−4)	Schmidt 23'	Report		Stadium: CIBC Hamilton Pan Am Soccer Stadium; Attendance: 23,197

9 June 2015 2015 World Cup group stage	France	1–0	England	Moncton, Canada
14:00 ADT	Le Sommer 33'	Report	Chapman (yellow card) 65'	Stadium: Moncton Stadium; Attendance: 11,686; Referee: Thalia Mitsi (Greece)

13 June 2015 2015 World Cup group stage	England	2–1	Mexico	Moncton, Canada
17:00 ADT (UTC−3)	Kirby 71'; Carney 82' (yellow card) 90+3'	Report	Garciamendez (yellow card) 64'; Fabiola Ibarra 90+1'	Stadium: Moncton Stadium; Attendance: 13,138; Referee: Anne-Marie Keighley (New Zealand)

17 June 2015 2015 World Cup group stage	England	2–1	Colombia	Montreal, Canada
17:00 PDT (UTC−4)	Carney 15'; Williams 38' (pen.); A. Scott (yellow card) 65'	Report	Usme (yellow card) 36'; Arias (yellow card) 37'; Sepúlveda (yellow card) 85'; Lady Andrade 90+4' (pen.)	Stadium: Olympic Stadium; Attendance: 13,862; Referee: Carol Anne Chenard (Canada)

22 June 2015 2015 World Cup round of 16	Norway	1–2	England	Ottawa, Canada
17:00 PDT (UTC−4)	Gulbrandsen 54'	Report	Houghton 61'; Bronze 76'	Stadium: Lansdowne Stadium; Attendance: 19,829; Referee: Esther Staubli (Switzerland)

27 June 2015 2015 World Cup quarter-final	England	2–1	Canada	Vancouver, Canada
16:30 PDT (UTC−7)	Taylor 11'; Bronze 13'; Moore (yellow card) 63'	Report	Sinclair 42'; Sesselmann (yellow card) 90+3'	Stadium: BC Place Stadium; Attendance: 54,027; Referee: Claudia Umpierrez (Uruguay)

1 July 2015 2015 World Cup semi-final	Japan	2–1	England	Edmonton, Canada
17:00 MDT (UTC−6)	Miyama 33' (pen.); Ogimi (yellow card) 90'; Bassett 90+2' (o.g.)	Report	Rafferty (yellow card) 31'; Williams 40' (pen.)	Stadium: Commonwealth Stadium; Attendance: 31,467; Referee: Anne-Marie Keighley (New Zealand)

4 July 2015 2015 World Cup 3rd place	Germany	0–1 (a.e.t.)	England	Edmonton, Canada
14:00 MDT (UTC−6)		Report	Chapman (yellow card) 77'; Bardsley (yellow card) 83'; Bassett (yellow card) 92'; Williams 108' (pen.)	Stadium: Commonwealth Stadium; Attendance: 21,483; Referee: Ri Hyang-ok (North Korea)

21 September 2015 Euro 2017 qualifying	Estonia	0–8	England	Tallinn, Estonia
18:00 EET (UTC+2)		Report	Carter 2', 83', 90+2'; Potter 34'; Kirby 40', 81'; Christiansen (yellow card) 45' (goal) 74'; J. Scott 53'	Stadium: Lilleküla Stadium; Attendance: 1,342; Referee: Dilan Gökçek (Turkey)

23 October 2015 2015 Yongchuan Tournament	China	2–1	England	Yongchuan, Chongqing, China
16:00 CST (UTC+8)	Wang Shuang 5', 45'	Report	Potter (yellow card) 21'; Aluko 45+3'	Stadium: Yongchuan Sports Center; Attendance: 12,000; Referee: Liang Qin (China)

27 October 2015 2015 Yongchuan Tournament	England	1–0	Australia	Yongchuan, Chongqing, China
16:00 CST (UTC+8)	Christiansen 50'	Report		Stadium: Yongchuan Sports Center; Attendance: 1,800; Referee: Liang Qin (China)

26 November 2015 Friendly	Germany	0–0	England	Duisburg, Germany
18:00 CET (UTC+1)		Report	Houghton (yellow card) 19'	Stadium: MSV-Arena; Attendance: 6,705; Referee: Esther Staubli (Switzerland)

29 November 2015 Euro 2017 qualifying	England	1–0	Bosnia and Herzegovina	Bristol, England
16:30 GMT (UTC)	J. Scott 69'; Turner (yellow card) 71'	Report	Dijaković (yellow card) 51'	Stadium: Ashton Gate; Attendance: 13,040; Referee: Florence Guillemin (France)

=== 2016 ===
3 March 2016 2016 SheBelieves Cup	United States	1–0	England	Tampa, Florida
19:45 EST (UTC−5)	Dunn 72'	Report		Stadium: Raymond James Stadium; Attendance: 13,027; Referee: Tatiana Guzman (Nicaragua)

6 March 2016 2016 SheBelieves Cup	Germany	2–1	England	Nashville, Tennessee
16:30 CST (UTC−06:00)	Flaherty 76' (o.g.); Peter 82' (pen.)	Report	Duggan 9'	Stadium: Nissan Stadium; Attendance: 25,363; Referee: Katja Koroleva (United States)

9 March 2016 2016 SheBelieves Cup	France	0–0	England	Boca Raton, Florida
17:00 EST (UTC−05:00)				Stadium: FAU Stadium; Referee: Gillian Martindale (Barbados)

8 April 2016 Euro 2017 qualifying	England	1–1	Belgium	Rotherham, England
20:55 BST (UTC+1)	J.Scott 84'	Report	Cayman 18'	Stadium: New York Stadium; Attendance: 10,550; Referee: Gyöngyi Gaál (Hungary)

12 April 2016 Euro 2017 qualifying	Bosnia and Herzegovina	0–1	England	Zenica, Bosnia and Herzegovina
16:00 CEST (UTC+2)		Report	Carney 18'	Stadium: Bosnia and Herzegovina FA Training Centre; Attendance: 1,500; Referee: Simona Ghisletta (Switzerland)

4 June 2016 Euro 2017 qualifying	England	7–0	Serbia	Wycombe, England
	Greenwood 16'; Carney 34' (pen.), 60', 64'; Daly 43'; White 51'; Christiansen 52'	Report		Stadium: Adams Park; Attendance: 5,903; Referee: Lina Lehtovaara (Finland)

7 June 2016 Euro 2017 qualifying	Serbia	0–7	England	Stara Pazova, Serbia
			J. Scott 13'; White 28'; Davison 41', 46'; Damjanović 53' (o.g.); Parris 69', 90'	Stadium: Sports Center of FA of Serbia; Attendance: 120; Referee: Stéphanie Frappart (France)

15 September 2016 Euro 2017 qualifying	England	5–0	Estonia	Nottingham, England
	Carter 9', 17', 56'; J. Scott 13'; Carney 90+4'	Report		Stadium: Meadow Lane; Attendance: 7,052; Referee: Vera Opeykina (Russia)

20 September 2016 Euro 2017 qualifying	Belgium	0–2	England	Leuven, Belgium
		Report	Parris 65'; Carney 85'	Stadium: Den Dreef; Attendance: 6,754; Referee: Pernilla Larsson (Sweden)

21 October 2016 Friendly	England	0–0	France	Doncaster, England
		Report		Stadium: Keepmoat Stadium; Attendance: 7,398; Referee: Graziella Pirriatore (Italy)

25 October 2016 Friendly	Spain	1–2	England	Guadalajara, Spain
	Torrejón 18'	Report	Torrejón 13' (o.g.); Houghton 15'	Stadium: Estadio Pedro Escartín; Attendance: 3,000; Referee: Elia Martínez (Spain)

29 November 2016 Friendly	Netherlands	0–1	England	Tilburg, Netherlands
		Report	Taylor 75'	Stadium: Koning Willem II Stadion; Referee: Olga Zadinová (Czechia)

=== 2017 ===
22 January 2017 Friendly	England	0–1	Norway	La Manga, Spain
17:00 CET (UTC+1)		Report	Hegerberg 26'	Stadium: La Manga Stadium; Attendance: 8,816; Referee: Marta Huerta de Aza (Spain)

24 January 2017 Friendly	England	0–0	Sweden	San Pedro del Pinatar, Spain
17:00 CET (UTC+1)		Report		Stadium: Estadio José Antonio Pérez; Referee: Marte Sørø (Norway)

1 March 2017 2017 SheBelieves Cup	England	1–2	France	Chester, Pennsylvania
16:00 EST (UTC−5)	Nobbs 32'	Report	Delie 80'; Renard 90+5'	Stadium: Talen Energy Stadium; Attendance: 8,816; Referee: Melissa Borjas (Honduras)

4 March 2017 2017 SheBelieves Cup	United States	0–1	England	Harrison, New Jersey
17:00 EST (UTC−5)		Report	White 89'	Stadium: Red Bull Arena; Attendance: 26,500; Referee: Quetzalli Alvarado (Mexico)

7 March 2017 2017 SheBelieves Cup	Germany	1–0	England	Washington, D.C.
16:00 EST (UTC−5)	Mittag 44'	Report		Stadium: Robert F. Kennedy Memorial Stadium; Attendance: 21,638; Referee: Marie-Soleil Beaudoin (Canada)

7 April 2017 Friendly	England	1–1	Italy	Stoke-on-Trent, England
	Taylor 70'	Report	Cernoia 73'	Stadium: Vale Park; Attendance: 7,181; Referee: Morag Pirie (Scotland)

10 April 2017 Friendly	England	3–0	Austria	Milton Keynes, England
	White 5'; Bronze 67'; Christiansen 86'	Report		Stadium: Stadium MK; Attendance: 6,593; Referee: Gyöngyi Gaál (Hungary)

10 June 2017 Friendly	Switzerland	0–4	England	Biel/Bienne, Switzerland
		Report	Nobbs 30'; Kirby 40'; Taylor 50', 62'	Stadium: Tissot Arena; Referee: Marte Sørø (Norway)

1 July 2017 Friendly	Denmark	1–2	England	Gladsaxe, Denmark
	Harder 66'	Report	White 44', 76'	Stadium: Gladsaxe Stadium; Referee: Sara Persson (Sweden)

19 July 2017 Euro 2017 group stage	England	6–0	Scotland	Utrecht, Netherlands
	Taylor 11', 26', 53'; White 32'; Nobbs 87'; Duggan 90+3'	Report		Stadium: Stadion Galgenwaard; Attendance: Netherlands; Referee: Esther Staubli (Switzerland)

23 July 2017 Euro 2017 group stage	England	2–0	Spain	Breda, Netherlands
	Kirby 2'; Taylor 85'	Report		Stadium: Rat Verlegh Stadion; Attendance: 4,879; Referee: Carina Vitulano (Italy)

27 July 2017 Euro 2017 group stage	Portugal	1–2	England	Tilburg, Netherlands
	C. Mendes 17'	Report	Duggan 7'; Parris 48'	Stadium: Koning Willem II Stadion; Attendance: 3,335; Referee: Kateryna Monzul (Ukraine)

30 July 2017 Euro 2017 quarter-final	England	1–0	France	Deventer, Netherlands
	Taylor 60'	Report		Stadium: De Adelaarshorst; Attendance: 6,283; Referee: Esther Staubli (Switzerland)

3 August 2017 Euro 2017 semi-final	Netherlands	3–0	England	Enschede, Netherlands
	Miedema 22'; van de Donk 62'; Bright 90+3' (o.g.)	Report		Stadium: De Grolsch Veste; Attendance: 27,093; Referee: Stéphanie Frappart (France)

19 September 2017 2019 World Cup qualifying	England	6–0	Russia	Birkenhead, England
19:00	Parris 11'; Taylor 14'; Nobbs 36'; Bronze 44'; Duggan 57', 84'	Report		Stadium: Prenton Park; Attendance: 7,047; Referee: Stéphanie Frappart (France)

20 October 2017 Friendly	France	1–0	England	Valenciennes, France
19:50 BST	Asseyi 89'	Report		Stadium: Stade du Hainaut; Referee: Jana Adámková (Czechia)

24 November 2017 2019 World Cup qualifying	England	4–0	Bosnia and Herzegovina	Walsall, England
20:05	Houghton 19', 54'; Parris 46'; Kirby 83' (pen.)	Report		Stadium: Bescot Stadium; Referee: Ewa Augustyn (Poland)

28 November 2017 2019 World Cup qualifying	England	5–0	Kazakhstan	Colchester, England
20:05	Lawley 15'; Kirby 64' (pen.); Parris 69', 75'; Christiansen 76'	Report		Stadium: Colchester Community Stadium; Referee: Lois Otte (Belgium)

=== 2018 ===
1 March 2018 2018 SheBelieves Cup	England	4–1	France	Columbus, Ohio
21:00 ET	Duggan 7'; Scott 28'; Taylor 39'; Kirby 46'	Report	Thiney 77'	Stadium: Mapfre Stadium; Attendance: 7,566; Referee: Christina Unkel (United States)

4 March 2018 2018 SheBelieves Cup	Germany	2–2	England	Harrison, New Jersey
20:00 ET	Kayikçi 17'; Bright 51' (o.g.)	Report	White 18', 73'	Stadium: Red Bull Arena; Attendance: 7,882; Referee: Karen Abt (United States)

8 March 2018 2018 SheBelieves Cup	United States	1–0	England	Orlando, Florida
18:00 ET	Bardsley 58' (o.g.)	Report		Stadium: Orlando City Stadium; Attendance: 12,351; Referee: Carol Anne Chenard (Canada)

6 April 2018 2019 World Cup qualifying	England	0–0	Wales	Southampton, England
		Report		Stadium: St Mary's Stadium; Attendance: 25,603; Referee: Pernilla Larsson (Sweden)

10 April 2018 2019 World Cup qualifying	Bosnia and Herzegovina	0–2	England	Sarajevo, Bosnia and Herzegovina
		Report	Duggan 56'; Taylor 90+3' (pen.)	Stadium: Bosnia FA Training Center; Referee: Andromachi Tsiofliki (Greece)

8 June 2018 2019 World Cup qualifying	Russia	1–3	England	Moscow, Russia
	Danilova 31'	Report	Parris 22'; Scott 27', 36'	Stadium: Sapsan Arena; Attendance: 2,000; Referee: Riem Hussein (Germany)

31 August 2018 2019 World Cup qualifying	Wales	0–3	England	Newport, Wales
19:45		Report	Duggan 57'; Scott 60'; Parris 69'	Stadium: Rodney Parade; Attendance: 5,053; Referee: Katalin Kulcsár (Hungary)

4 September 2018 2019 World Cup qualifying	Kazakhstan	0–6	England	Pavlodar, Kazakhstan
		Report	Mead 9' (pen.) 82'; Daly 35'; Christiansen 54'; Staniforth 66'; Bronze 87'	Stadium: Tsentralniy; Referee: Hristiana Guteva (Bulgaria)

6 October 2018 Friendly	England	1–0	Brazil	Nottingham, England
12:30	Kirby 2'			Stadium: Meadow Lane; Attendance: 7,864; Referee: Sandra Braz Bastos (Portugal)

9 October 2018 Friendly	England	1–1	Australia	London, England
	Kirby 21'	Report	Polkinghorne 84'	Stadium: Craven Cottage; Attendance: 6,068; Referee: Florence Guillemin (France)

8 November 2018 Friendly	Austria	0–3	England	Maria Enzersdorf, Austria
19:00		Summary; Report	Ubogagu 26'; Stanway 71'; Daly 81'	Stadium: Bundesstadion Südstadt; Referee: Lucie Šulcová (Czechia)

11 November 2018 Friendly	England	0–2	Sweden	Rotherham, England
13:30		Report	Jakobsson 20'; Anvegård 33'	Stadium: New York Stadium; Attendance: 9,561; Referee: Petra Pavlikova (Slovakia)

=== 2019 ===
27 February 2019 2019 SheBelieves Cup	England	2–1	Brazil	Chester, Pennsylvania
16:00 EST	Bronze (yellow card) 27'; White 49'; Mead 75'	Report	Andressa 16' (pen.)	Stadium: Talen Energy Stadium; Attendance: 5,954; Referee: Ekaterina Koroleva (United States)

2 March 2019 2019 SheBelieves Cup	United States	2–2	England	Nashville, Tennessee
16:30 EST	Rapinoe 33'; Heath 67'	Report	Houghton 36'; Parris 52'	Stadium: Nissan Stadium; Attendance: 22,125; Referee: Marianela Araya (Costa Rica)

5 March 2019 2019 SheBelieves Cup	Japan	0–3	England	Tampa, Florida
17:15 EST		Report	Staniforth 12'; Carney 23'; Mead 30'; Houghton (yellow card) 85'	Stadium: Raymond James Stadium; Attendance: 8,580; Referee: Christina Unkel (United States)

5 April 2019 Friendly	England	0–1	Canada	Manchester, England
19:00		Report	Chapman (yellow card) 34'; Sinclair 81'	Stadium: Academy Stadium; Attendance: 5,682; Referee: Ivana Martincic (Croatia)

9 April 2019 Friendly	England	2–1	Spain	Swindon, England
19:00	Scott (yellow card) 19'; Mead 36'; White 46'	Report	León (yellow card) 20'; Bonmatí 67'	Stadium: County Ground; Attendance: 13,449; Referee: Stephanie Frappart (France)

25 May 2019 Friendly	England	2–0	Denmark	Walsall, England
15:00	Parris 45+1'; Scott 59'	Report		Stadium: Bescot Stadium; Attendance: 8,273; Referee: Desiree Grundbacher (Switzerland)

1 June 2019 Friendly	England	0–1	New Zealand	Brighton and Hove, England
15:00		Report	Gregorius 50'; Riley (yellow card) 56'	Stadium: Falmer Stadium; Attendance: 20,076; Referee: Monika Mularczyk (Poland)

9 June 2019 2019 World Cup group stage	England	2–1	Scotland	Nice, France
18:00 CEST	Parris 14' (pen.); White 40'	Report	Beattie (yellow card) 43'; Docherty (yellow card) 47'; Emslie 79'	Stadium: Allianz Riviera; Attendance: 13,188; Referee: Jana Adámková (Czech Republic)

14 June 2019 2019 World Cup group stage	England	1–0	Argentina	Le Havre, France
21:00 CEST	Moore (yellow card) 45+2'; Taylor 61'	Report	Cometti (yellow card) 39'; Barroso (yellow card) 69'	Stadium: Stade Océane; Attendance: 20,294; Referee: Qin Liang (China)

19 June 2019 2019 World Cup group stage	Japan	0–2	England	Nice, France
21:00 CEST		Report	White 14', 84'	Stadium: Allianz Riviera; Attendance: 14,319; Referee: Claudia Umpiérrez (Uruguay)

23 June 2019 2019 World Cup round of 16	England	3–0	Cameroon	Valenciennes, France
17:30 CEST	Houghton 14'; White 45+4'; Greenwood 58'	Report	Leuko (yellow card) 4'; Takounda (yellow card) 90+10'	Stadium: Stade du Hainaut; Attendance: 20,148; Referee: Qin Liang (China PR)

27 June 2019 2019 World Cup quarter-final	Norway	0–3	England	Le Havre, France
21:00 CEST	Thorisdottir (yellow card) 88'	Report	Scott 3'; White 40'; Bronze 57'	Stadium: Stade Océane; Attendance: 21,111; Referee: Lucila Venegas (Mexico)

2 July 2019 2019 World Cup semi-final	England	1–2	United States	Décines-Charpieu, France
21:00 CEST	White 19'; Bright (yellow card) 40' (yellow-red card) 86'; Parris (yellow card) 90+5'	Report	Press 10'; Morgan 31'; Horan (yellow card) 47'; Sauerbrunn (yellow card) 83'	Stadium: Parc Olympique Lyonnais; Attendance: 53,512; Referee: Edina Alves Batista (Brazil)

6 July 2019 2019 World Cup 3rd place	England	1–2	Sweden	Nice, France
17:00 CEST	Kirby 31'; Moore (yellow card) 90+4'	Report	Asllani 11'; Jakobsson 22'; Lindahl (yellow card) 85'	Stadium: Allianz Riviera; Attendance: 20,316; Referee: Anastasia Pustovoitova (Russia)

29 August 2019 Friendly	Belgium	3–3	England	Leuven, Belgium
19:30 CEST	Philtjens (yellow card) 16'; Biesmans (yellow card) 29'; Telford 38' (o.g.); Van Kerkhoven 45+2', 55'	Report	Taylor 22'; Mead 26'; Parris 75' (pen.); McManus (yellow card) 90+3'	Stadium: Den Dreef; Referee: Riem Hussein (Germany)

3 September 2019 Friendly	Norway	2–1	England	Bergen, Norway
18:00 CEST	Maanum 53'; Graham Hansen 89'	Report	Stanway 10'	Stadium: Brann Stadion; Referee: Lina Lehtovaara (Finland)

5 October 2019 Friendly	England	1–2	Brazil	Middlesbrough, England
12:45	Daly (yellow card) 65'; England 80'	Report	Marta (yellow card) 35'; Debinha 49', 67'; Ludmila (yellow card) 57'; Milene (yellow card) 80'	Stadium: Riverside Stadium; Attendance: 29,238; Referee: Riem Hussein (Germany)

8 October 2019 Friendly	Portugal	0–1	England	Setúbal, Portugal
19:00	Pinto (yellow card) 15'; Silva (yellow card) 53'	Report	Mead 72'	Stadium: Estádio do Bonfim; Referee: Lucia Abruzzese (Italy)

9 November 2019 Friendly	England	1–2	Germany	London, England
17:30	White 44'	Report	Popp 9'; Doorsoun (yellow card) 30'; Frohms (yellow card) 36'; Kleinherne (yellow card) 53'; Bühl 90'	Stadium: Wembley Stadium; Attendance: 77,768; Referee: Stéphanie Frappart (France)

12 November 2019 Friendly	Czech Republic	2–3	England	České Budějovice, Czech Republic
20:45 CEST	Szewieczková 15', 27'	Report	England 17'; Mead 20'; Nobbs (yellow card) 84'; Williamson 86'	Stadium: Stadion Střelecký ostrov Referee: Ewa Augustyn (Poland)
