= 2015 FIFA Women's World Cup qualification =

Tournament details
- Dates: 4 April 2013 – 2 December 2014
- Teams: 134 (from 6 confederations)

Tournament statistics
- Matches played: 406
- Goals scored: 1,686 (4.15 per match)
- Top scorer: (Netherlands) Vivianne Miedema (16 goals)

The qualification for the 2015 FIFA Women's World Cup determined which 23 teams joined Canada, the hosts of the 2015 tournament, to play at the FIFA Women's World Cup.

The field was expanded from 16 teams in the 2011 edition to 24 in the 2015 edition. As a result, a new distribution of slots to each confederation was announced by FIFA on 11 June 2012:

- AFC (Asia): 5 slots (up from 3)
- CAF (Africa): 3 slots (up from 2)
- CONCACAF (North/Central America, Caribbean): 3.5+1 (host) slots (up from 2.5)
- CONMEBOL (South America): 2.5 slots (up from 2)
- OFC (Oceania): 1 slot (same as 2011)
- UEFA (Europe): 8 slots (up from 4.5+1)

A record of 134 FIFA member nations (not counting Canada) entered the qualifying tournaments. Additionally two non-FIFA nations entered the CONCACAF qualifying. Four African teams withdrew before playing any match.

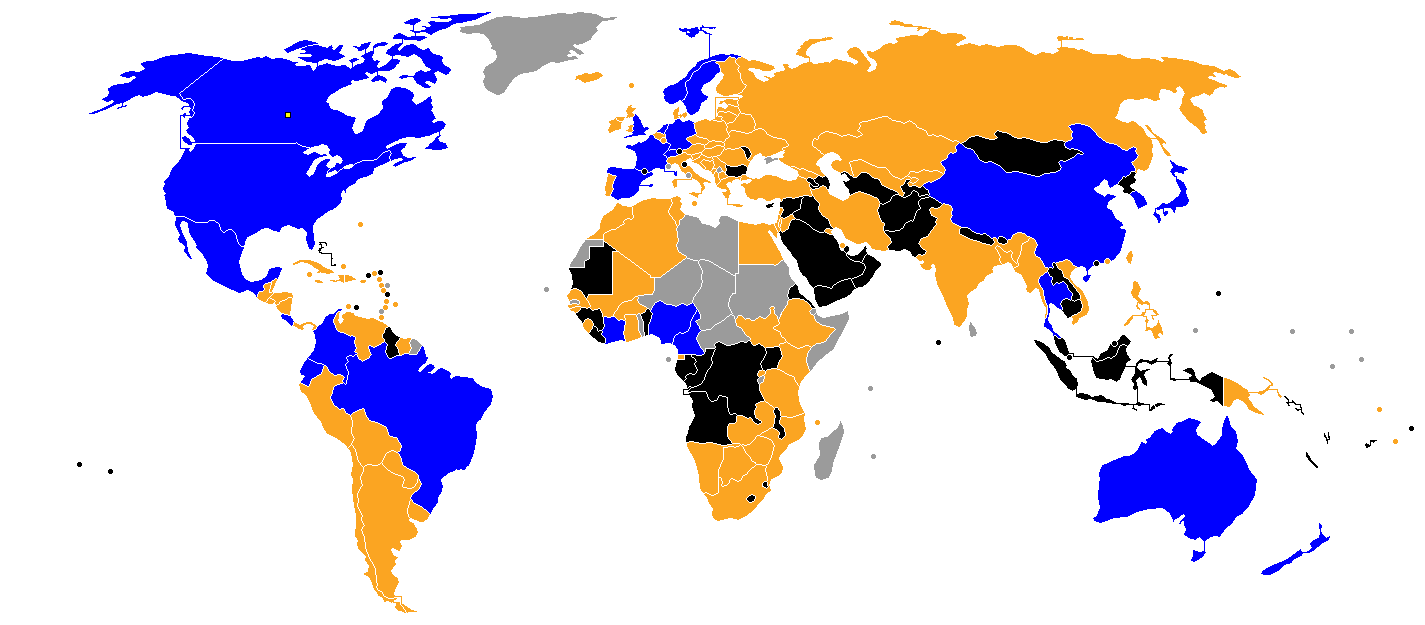
Qualified Did not qualify Did not enter Not active women's team

== Qualified teams ==
Team	Qualified as	Qualification date	Appearance in final	Consecutive streak	Previous best performance	FIFA Ranking^{1}
Canada	Hosts	3 March 2011	6th	6	Fourth place (2003)	8
Japan	2014 AFC Women's Asian Cup winner	18 May 2014	7th	7	Winners (2011)	3
Australia	2014 AFC Women's Asian Cup runner-up	18 May 2014	6th	6	Quarterfinals (2007, 2011)	10
China	2014 AFC Women's Asian Cup 3rd place	17 May 2014	6th	1	Runners-up (1999)	14
South Korea	2014 AFC Women's Asian Cup 4th place	17 May 2014	2nd	1	First round (2003)	17
Thailand	2014 AFC Women's Asian Cup 5th place	21 May 2014	1st	1	Debut	30
Switzerland	UEFA qualification group 3 winner	15 June 2014	1st	1	Debut	18
England	UEFA qualification group 6 winner	21 August 2014	4th	3	Quarterfinals (1995, 2007, 2011)	7
Norway	UEFA qualification group 5 winner	13 September 2014	7th	7	Winners (1995)	9
Germany	UEFA qualification group 1 winner	13 September 2014	7th	7	Winners (2003, 2007)	2
Spain	UEFA qualification group 2 winner	13 September 2014	1st	1	Debut	16
France	UEFA qualification group 7 winner	13 September 2014	3rd	2	Fourth place (2011)	4
Sweden	UEFA qualification group 4 winner	17 September 2014	7th	7	Runners-up (2003)	5
Brazil	2014 Copa América Femenina winner	26 September 2014	7th	7	Runners-up (2007)	6
Colombia	2014 Copa América Femenina runner-up	28 September 2014	2nd	2	First round (2011)	31
Nigeria	2014 African Women's Championship winner	22 October 2014	7th	7	Quarterfinals (1999)	35
Cameroon	2014 African Women's Championship runner-up	22 October 2014	1st	1	Debut	51
United States	2014 CONCACAF Women's Championship winner	24 October 2014	7th	7	Winners (1991, 1999)	1
Costa Rica	2014 CONCACAF Women's Championship runner-up	24 October 2014	1st	1	Debut	40
Ivory Coast	2014 African Women's Championship 3rd place	25 October 2014	1st	1	Debut	64
Mexico	2014 CONCACAF Women's Championship 3rd place	26 October 2014	3rd	2	First round (1999, 2011)	25
New Zealand	2014 OFC Women's Nations Cup winner	29 October 2014	4th	3	First round (1991, 2007, 2011)	19
Netherlands	UEFA qualification play-off winner	27 November 2014	1st	1	Debut	15
Ecuador	CONMEBOL-CONCACAF play-off winner	2 December 2014	1st	1	Debut	49

1.The rankings are shown as of 19 September 2014 – the last rankings published prior to the official draw.

== Qualifying tournaments ==
Confederation	Tournament	Nations started	Qualified	Slots	Qualification started	Qualification ends
AFC	2014 AFC Women's Asian Cup	20	5	5	21 May 2013	21 May 2014
CAF	2014 African Women's Championship	26	3	3	14 February 2014	25 October 2014
CONCACAF	2014 CONCACAF Women's Championship	28+1^{1}	3+1	3½+1	19 May 2014	2 December 2014
CONMEBOL	2014 Copa América Femenina	10	3	2½	11 September 2014	2 December 2014
OFC	2014 OFC Women's Nations Cup	4	1	1	25 October 2014	29 October 2014
UEFA	2015 FIFA Women's World Cup qualification (UEFA)	46	8	8	4 April 2013	27 November 2014
Total		134+1	23+1	23+1	4 April 2013	2 December 2014

- ^{1} 30 nations started, but Martinique and Guadeloupe are not eligible for World Cup qualification. They are only members of CONCACAF and not FIFA.

== Confederation qualification ==
=== AFC ===
(20 teams competing for 5 berths)

As in the previous World Cup cycle, the 2014 AFC Women's Asian Cup served as the qualifying tournament. A total of 20 AFC teams competed for five berths.

The final tournament, held in Vietnam from 14 to 25 May 2014, was competed by eight teams, four of which – Australia, China, Japan and South Korea – were automatically qualified though their 2010 placement, while the others were determined via a qualification tournament. North Korea was banned from the tournament due to the sanction on their doping cases in 2011 FIFA Women's World Cup.

==== Group stage ====
The top two teams from each group advanced to the semifinals of the tournament as well as qualifying for the World Cup. The third placed teams advanced to a playoff against each other to determine the fifth and final qualifying team from the AFC.

Group A
Pos	Team	Pld	Pts
1	Japan	3	7
2	Australia	3	7
3	Vietnam (H)	3	3
4	Jordan	3	0

Source: AFC Schedule & Results
(H) Hosts

Group B
Pos	Team	Pld	Pts
1	South Korea	3	7
2	China	3	7
3	Thailand	3	3
4	Myanmar	3	0

Source: AFC Schedule & Results

Japan, Australia, China and South Korea qualified for the World Cup. Vietnam and Thailand advanced to the fifth-place play-off.

==== Fifth place play-off ====
Team 1	Score	Team 2
Vietnam	1–2	Thailand

Thailand qualified for the World Cup.

=== CAF ===
(26 teams competing for 3 berths)

As in the previous World Cup cycle, the 2014 African Women's Championship served as the qualification tournament for the Women's World Cup. The qualifying saw a record entry of 25 CAF teams (26 if including final tournament host Namibia). Four teams though withdrew before playing any matches.

A total of eight teams (the host nation and seven teams which came through the qualifying rounds) competed at the final tournament in Namibia from 11 to 25 October 2014. The top three teams of the final tournament qualified for the World Cup.

==== Knockout stage ====
Nigeria, Cameroon and Ivory Coast qualified for the World Cup.

=== CONCACAF ===
(28 teams competing for 3 or 4 berths, host nation Canada also qualifies)

As with the previous World Cups, the 2014 CONCACAF Women's Championship served as the region's qualification tournament. A total of 30 teams entered qualifying, with Martinique and Guadeloupe not eligible for World Cup qualification as they are only members of CONCACAF and not FIFA. Therefore, a total of 28 teams were in contention for the three direct places plus the play-off place against CONMEBOL's Ecuador. Canada did not participate as they already qualified to the World Cup as hosts.

The final tournament was held in the United States from 15 to 26 October 2014, and the final group draw took place on 5 September. The United States and Mexico received byes to the tournament's final round, where they were joined by Costa Rica and Guatemala from Central America and by Haiti, Jamaica, Martinique, and Trinidad and Tobago from the Caribbean zone. Both finalists and the third placed team qualified automatically to the 2015 Women's World Cup. The fourth placed team advanced to play the third placed team from CONMEBOL for an additional World Cup berth. It was announced during the Final Draw on 5 September that Martinique was not able to advance beyond the group round, and that the next best team would have taken their place in the semifinals if they finished in the top two in their group.

==== Knockout stage ====
Semifinals
October 24 – Chester, PA
Costa Rica (pen.)	1 (3)
Trinidad and Tobago	1 (0)
October 24 – Chester, PA
United States	3
Mexico	0

Final
October 26 – Chester, PA
Costa Rica	0
United States	6
Third place match
October 26 – Chester, PA
Trinidad and Tobago	2
Mexico (a.e.t.)	4

United States, Costa Rica and Mexico qualified for the World Cup. Trinidad and Tobago advanced to the CONCACAF–CONMEBOL play-off.

=== CONMEBOL ===
(10 teams competing for 2 or 3 berths)

As with previous World Cup qualifications, the 2014 Copa América Femenina served as the qualification tournament to the World Cup finals.

All 10 CONMEBOL teams competed in the tournament, held in Ecuador from 11 to 28 September 2014. The top two teams of the second stage qualified directly for the World Cup, while the third placed team advanced to play the fourth placed team from CONCACAF for an additional World Cup berth.

==== Final stage ====
Pos	Team	Pld	Pts
1	Brazil	3	7
2	Colombia	3	5
3	Ecuador (H)	3	3
4	Argentina	3	1

Source: CONMEBOL
(H) Hosts

=== OFC ===
(4 teams competing for 1 berth)

As in the previous World Cup cycle, the 2014 OFC Women's Nations Cup served as the qualifying tournament.

Only four OFC teams played in the tournament, held in Papua New Guinea from 25 to 29 October 2014. That was fewer than in the last four editions of the tournament. The winner qualified.

==== Final stage ====
Pos	Team	Pld	Pts
1	New Zealand	3	9
2	Papua New Guinea (H)	3	6
3	Cook Islands	3	1
4	Tonga	3	1

Source: OFC
(H) Hosts

New Zealand qualified for the World Cup.

=== UEFA ===
(46 teams competing for 8 berths)

A record 46 UEFA teams entered qualification. The eight lowest teams entered the tournament in the preliminary round and were drawn into two groups of four, played in single round-robin format from 4 to 9 April 2013 in Malta and Lithuania respectively. The winners and runners-up of each group advanced to the group stage.

The group stage was played in home-and-away round-robin format from 20 September 2013 to 17 September 2014. All seven group winners qualified directly to the final tournament, while the four runners-ups with the best record against the sides first, third, fourth, and fifth in their groups advanced to play-off matches for the remaining berth.

The play-off matches were played in home-and-away two-legged format on 25/26 and 29/30 October (semi-finals), and 22/23 and 26/27 November 2014 (finals).

==== Group stage ====
Group 1
Pos	Team	Pld	Pts
1	Germany	10	30
2	Russia	10	22
3	Republic of Ireland	10	17
4	Croatia	10	8
5	Slovenia	10	6
6	Slovakia	10	4

Source: UEFA

Group 2
Pos	Team	Pld	Pts
1	Spain	10	28
2	Italy	10	25
3	Czech Republic	10	14
4	Romania	10	11
5	Estonia	10	7
6	Macedonia	10	1

Source: UEFA

Group 3
Pos	Team	Pld	Pts
1	Switzerland	10	28
2	Iceland	10	19
3	Denmark	10	18
4	Israel	10	12
5	Serbia	10	10
6	Malta	10	0

Source: UEFA

Group 4
Pos	Team	Pld	Pts
1	Sweden	10	30
2	Scotland	10	24
3	Poland	10	16
4	Bosnia and Herzegovina	10	9
5	Northern Ireland	10	5
6	Faroe Islands	10	2

Source: UEFA

Group 5
Pos	Team	Pld	Pts
1	Norway	10	27
2	Netherlands	10	25
3	Belgium	10	19
4	Portugal	10	12
5	Greece	10	3
6	Albania	10	3

Source: UEFA

Group 6
Pos	Team	Pld	Pts
1	England	10	30
2	Ukraine	10	22
3	Wales	10	19
4	Turkey	10	12
5	Belarus	10	6
6	Montenegro	10	0

Source: UEFA

Group 7
Pos	Team	Pld	Pts
1	France	10	30
2	Austria	10	21
3	Finland	10	21
4	Hungary	10	12
5	Kazakhstan	10	4
6	Bulgaria	10	1

Source: UEFA

Germany, Spain, Switzerland, Sweden, Norway, England and France qualified for the World Cup. Italy, Scotland, Netherlands and Ukraine advanced to the play-offs.

==== Play-offs ====
Semifinals
Scotland	1	0	1
Netherlands	2	2	4
Italy	2	2	4
Ukraine	1	2	3

Final
Netherlands	1	2	3
Italy	1	1	2

Netherlands qualified for the World Cup.

== CONMEBOL–CONCACAF play-off ==
The play-off was contested between Trinidad and Tobago, CONCACAF's fourth-placed team, and Ecuador, CONMEBOL's third-placed team. The draw for the order of legs was held in Zürich on 22 July 2014. Ecuador hosted the first leg on 8 November 2014, and Trinidad and Tobago hosted the second leg on 2 December 2014.

Team 1	Agg.	Team 2	1st leg	2nd leg
Ecuador	1–0	Trinidad and Tobago	0–0	1–0

Ecuador qualified for the World Cup.
