= 2015 FIFA Women's World Cup qualification – UEFA Group 6 =

Soccer tournament

The 2015 FIFA Women's World Cup qualification UEFA Group 6 was a UEFA qualifying group for the 2015 FIFA Women's World Cup. The group comprised Belarus, England, Montenegro, Turkey, Ukraine and Wales.

The group winners qualified directly for the 2015 FIFA Women's World Cup. Among the seven group runners-up, the four best (determined by records against the first-, third-, fourth- and fifth-placed teams only for balance between different groups) advanced to the play-offs.

England qualified for its third consecutive World Cup on 21 August 2014 after winning 4–0 against Wales.

== Standings ==
Pos	Team	Pld	W	D	L	GF	GA	GD	Pts	Qualification	England	Ukraine	Wales	Turkey	Belarus	Montenegro
1	England	10	10	0	0	52	1	+51	30	Women's World Cup	—	4–0	2–0	8–0	6–0	9–0
2	Ukraine	10	7	1	2	34	9	+25	22	Play-offs	1–2	—	1–0	8–0	8–0	7–0
3	Wales	10	6	1	3	18	9	+9	19		0–4	1–1	—	1–0	1–0	4–0
4	Turkey	10	4	0	6	12	31	−19	12		0–4	0–1	1–5	—	3–0	3–1
5	Belarus	10	2	0	8	12	31	−19	6		0–3	1–3	0–3	1–2	—	3–1
6	Montenegro	10	0	0	10	6	53	−47	0		0–10	1–4	0–3	2–3	1–7	—

Source: UEFA
Rules for classification: Tiebreakers

== Results ==
All times are CEST (UTC+02:00) during summer and CET (UTC+01:00) during winter.

21 September 2013
14:00

England	6–0	Belarus
Carney 3', 26', 40'; White 13'; Dowie 60'; Aluko 62'	Report

Dean Court, Bournemouth
Attendance: 6,818
Referee: Riem Hussein (Germany)

26 September 2013
20:00

Wales	1–0	Belarus
Ward 81'	Report

Cardiff City Stadium, Cardiff
Attendance: 820
Referee: Eszter Urban (Hungary)
26 September 2013
20:05

England	8–0	Turkey
Duggan 1', 2', 37'; White 30', 39'; Aluko 33', 49'; Dowie 75'	Report

Fratton Park, Portsmouth
Attendance: 6,293
Referee: Olga Zadinová (Czech Republic)

26 October 2013
13:00

Belarus	3–1	Montenegro
Pilipenko 2'; Kharlanova 45+1'; Avkhimovich 84'	Report	Vukčević 69'

City Stadium, Molodechno
Attendance: 250
Referee: Eleni Lampadariou (Greece)
26 October 2013
20:05

England	2–0	Wales
Nobbs 48'; Duggan 57'	Report

The Den, London
Attendance: 5,764
Referee: Stéphanie Frappart (France)

31 October 2013
13:30

Montenegro	1–4	Ukraine
Krivokapić 89'	Report	Dyatel 31'; Aloshycheva 43'; Romanenko 68'; Pekur 82'

Gradski stadion, Nikšić
Attendance: 290
Referee: Zuzana Kováčová (Slovakia)
31 October 2013
16:00

Turkey	0–4	England
	Report	Aluko 10'; Williams 17' (pen.); Duggan 48'; Nobbs 60'

Adana 5 Ocak Stadium, Adana
Attendance: 784
Referee: Yuliya Medvedeva-Keldyusheva (Kazakhstan)

23 November 2013
13:00

Montenegro	0–3	Wales
	Report	Keryakoplis 31'; Ward 70' (pen.), 79'

Gradski stadion, Nikšić
Attendance: 50
Referee: Florence Guillemin (France)

28 November 2013
15:00

Turkey	3–1	Montenegro
Çınar 11'; Uraz 68'; Topçu 75'	Report	Vukčević 90+3'

Buca Arena, İzmir
Attendance: 119
Referee: Leen Martens (Belgium)

13 February 2014
13:30

Turkey	0–1	Ukraine
	Report	Romanenko 39'

Adana 5 Ocak Stadium, Adana
Attendance: 1,131
Referee: Ana Minić (Serbia)

4 April 2014
14:00

Turkey	1–5	Wales
Karabulut 90'	Report	Fishlock 3', 25', 37'; Wiltshire 32' (pen.); Harding 67'

Eskişehir Atatürk Stadium, Eskişehir
Attendance: 516
Referee: Aneliya Sinabova (Bulgaria)
5 April 2014
13:55

England	9–0	Montenegro
Duggan 2', 13', 71'; Aluko 37'; J. Scott 40'; Carney 49'; Sanderson 55'; Stokes 69'; Dowie 84'	Report

Falmer Stadium, Brighton and Hove
Attendance: 8,908
Referee: Elia Martinez (Spain)

9 April 2014
20:05

Wales	1–1	Ukraine
Harding 78'	Report	Boychenko 7'

Parc y Scarlets, Llanelli
Attendance: 807
Referee: Séverine Zinck (France)
10 April 2014
15:00

Montenegro	1–7	Belarus
Krivokapić 24'	Report	Pilipenko 37', 64'; Borisenko 52'; Miroshnichenko 71', 82', 87', 89'

Gradski stadion, Nikšić
Attendance: 150
Referee: Marte Sørø (Norway)

7 May 2014
16:00

Belarus	1–2	Turkey
Kozyupa 90+4'	Report	Uraz 73'; Kara 90+5'

Spartak Stadium, Mogilev
Attendance: 2,100
Referee: Zuzana Kováčová (Slovakia)
8 May 2014
20:00

Wales	4–0	Montenegro
Wiltshire 12'; Fishlock 14', 23', 50'	Report

Nantporth, Bangor
Attendance: 573
Referee: Lina Lehtovaara (Finland)
8 May 2014
20:30

England	4–0	Ukraine
Dowie 41', 53'; Aluko 49', 63'	Report

New Meadow, Shrewsbury
Attendance: 5,880
Referee: Sara Persson (Sweden)

14 June 2014
16:00

Wales	1–0	Turkey
Wiltshire 33'	Report

Bridge Meadow Stadium, Haverfordwest
Attendance: 890
Referee: Monika Mularczyk (Poland)
14 June 2014
17:00

Belarus	0–3	England
	Report	Aluko 31'; Houghton 36'; Bronze 90+5'

Traktor Stadium, Minsk
Attendance: 350
Referee: Jana Adámková (Czech Republic)
14 June 2014
17:00

Ukraine	7–0	Montenegro
Dyatel 31', 50'; Yakovishyn 33'; Apanaschenko 58'; Boychenko 61'; Mrkić 76' (o.g.); Romanenko 79'	Report

Arena Lviv, Lviv
Attendance: 1,822
Referee: Sandra Bastos (Portugal)

19 June 2014
17:00

Montenegro	2–3	Turkey
Bulatović 23', 49'	Report	Duman 45+2'; Uraz 58'; Kara 80'

Stadion Pod Malim Brdom, Petrovac
Attendance: 350
Referee: Sabine Bonnin (France)
19 June 2014
17:00

Ukraine	1–2	England
Ovdiychuk 63'	Report	Stoney 11'; Aluko 14'

Arena Lviv, Lviv
Attendance: 3,757
Referee: Cristina Dorcioman (Romania)
19 June 2014
17:00

Belarus	0–3	Wales
	Report	Harding 79', 85', 90+4'

Traktor Stadium, Minsk
Attendance: 350
Referee: Linn Andersson (Sweden)

2 August 2014
17:00

Ukraine	8–0	Belarus
Pekur 27', 82'; Apanaschenko 34' (pen.); Ovdiychuk 38'; Yakovishyn 58', 67'; Romanenko 61'; Dyatel 64'	Report

FFU Training Complex, Kyiv
Attendance: 860
Referee: Sharon Sluyts (Belgium)

Game was originally scheduled for 5 April 2014 but moved back due to the 2014 Ukrainian revolution.

20 August 2014
17:00

Belarus	1–3	Ukraine
Pilipenko 61'	Report	Yakovishyn 10'; Apanaschenko 87'; Dyatel 90+3'

Traktor Stadium, Minsk
Attendance: 210
Referee: Monika Mularczyk (Poland)
21 August 2014
20:05

Wales	0–4	England
	Report	Carney 16'; Aluko 39'; Bassett 44'; Sanderson 45'

Cardiff City Stadium, Cardiff
Attendance: 3,581
Referee: Efthalia Mitsi (Greece)

13 September 2014
17:00

Ukraine	8–0	Turkey
Romanenko 33'; Boychenko 44', 45', 53'; Yakovishyn 67', 69', 77'; Dyatel 80'	Report

Arena Lviv, Lviv
Attendance: 892
Referee: Riem Hussein (Germany)

17 September 2014
14:00

Turkey	3–0	Belarus
Kara 40'; Uraz 60', 69'	Report

Minareliçavuş Spor Tesisleri, Bursa
Attendance: 103
Referee: Marianne Svendsen (Denmark)
17 September 2014
15:00

Ukraine	1–0	Wales
Romanenko 61'	Report

Arena Lviv, Lviv
Attendance: 673
Referee: Esther Staubli (Switzerland)
17 September 2014
16:00

Montenegro	0–10	England
	Report	Aluko 8', 31', 64'; Carney 22', 51'; Bronze 27'; Duggan 56', 90+4'; Greenwood 90'; Potter 90+3'

Stadion Pod Malim Brdom, Petrovac
Attendance: 300
Referee: Petra Chudá (Slovakia)

== Goalscorers ==
13 goals

- (England) Eniola Aluko

10 goals

- (England) Toni Duggan

7 goals

- (England) Karen Carney
- (Ukraine) Oksana Yakovyshyn

6 goals

- (Ukraine) Olha Boychenko
- (Ukraine) Vira Dyatel
- (Ukraine) Tetyana Romanenko
- (Wales) Jess Fishlock

5 goals

- (England) Natasha Dowie
- (Turkey) Yağmur Uraz
- (Wales) Natasha Harding

4 goals

- (Belarus) Liana Mirashnichenka
- (Belarus) Anna Pilipenko

3 goals

- (England) Ellen White
- (Turkey) Fatma Kara
- (Ukraine) Daryna Apanaschenko
- (Ukraine) Lyudmyla Pekur
- (Wales) Helen Ward
- (Wales) Sarah Wiltshire

2 goals

- (England) Lucy Bronze
- (England) Jordan Nobbs
- (England) Lianne Sanderson
- (Montenegro) Sladjana Bulatović
- (Montenegro) Ivana Krivokapić
- (Montenegro) Marija Vukčević
- (Ukraine) Olha Ovdiychuk

1 goal

- (Belarus) Ekaterina Avkhimovich
- (Belarus) Julia Borisenko
- (Belarus) Anastasiya Kharlanova
- (Belarus) Anna Kozyupa
- (England) Laura Bassett
- (England) Alex Greenwood
- (England) Steph Houghton
- (England) Josanne Potter
- (England) Jill Scott
- (England) Casey Stoney
- (England) Demi Stokes
- (England) Fara Williams
- (Turkey) Sevgi Çınar
- (Turkey) Sibel Duman
- (Turkey) Arzu Karabulut
- (Turkey) Ebru Topçu
- (Ukraine) Valeria Aleshicheva
- (Ukraine) Daryna Apanaschenko
- (Wales) Hannah Keryakoplis

1 own goal

- (Montenegro) Jovana Mrkić (playing against Ukraine)
