= 2015 FIFA Women's World Cup qualification – UEFA Group 3 =

Football tournament qualification stage

The 2015 FIFA Women's World Cup qualification UEFA Group 3 was a UEFA qualifying group for the 2015 FIFA Women's World Cup. The group comprised Denmark, Iceland, Israel, Malta, Serbia and Switzerland.

The group winners qualified directly for the 2015 FIFA Women's World Cup. Among the seven group runners-up, the four best (determined by records against the first-, third-, fourth- and fifth-placed teams only for balance between different groups) advanced to the play-offs.

After winning 9–0 at home against Israel on 14 June 2014, Switzerland qualified for the 2015 Women's World Cup on 15 June after Denmark's match with Iceland ended in a draw, which meant that Switzerland was assured group winners. Switzerland also became the first European nation to qualify for the 2015 Women's World Cup.

== Standings ==
Pos	Team	Pld	W	D	L	GF	GA	GD	Pts	Qualification	Switzerland	Iceland	Denmark	Israel	Serbia	Malta
1	Switzerland	10	9	1	0	53	1	+52	28	Women's World Cup	—	3–0	1–1	9–0	9–0	11–0
2	Iceland	10	6	1	3	29	9	+20	19		0–2	—	0–1	3–0	9–1	5–0
3	Denmark	10	5	3	2	25	6	+19	18		0–1	1–1	—	0–1	3–1	8–0
4	Israel	10	4	0	6	9	27	−18	12		0–5	0–1	0–5	—	3–1	2–0
5	Serbia	10	3	1	6	16	34	−18	10		0–7	1–2	1–1	3–0	—	5–0
6	Malta	10	0	0	10	0	55	−55	0		0–5	0–8	0–5	0–3 (Note: Israel were awarded a 3–0 win. The match originally ended 2–0 to Israel.)	0–3	—

Source: UEFA
Rules for classification: Tiebreakers

== Results ==
All times are CEST (UTC+02:00) during summer and CET (UTC+01:00) during winter.

21 September 2013
19:30

Switzerland	9–0	Serbia
Bachmann 13', 83'; Crnogorčević 21', 61', 81', 87'; Dickenmann 36' (pen.); Wälti 38'; Bürki 75'	Report

Centre sportif de Colovray Nyon, Nyon
Attendance: 915
Referee: Morag Pirie (Scotland)

26 September 2013
20:30

Iceland	0–2	Switzerland
	Report	Bachmann 9'; Dickenmann 54' (pen.)

Laugardalsvöllur, Reykjavík
Attendance: 2,050
Referee: Christine Baitinger (Germany)

26 October 2013
15:00

Serbia	1–1	Denmark
Čubrilo 20'	Report	Harder 19'

Inđija Stadium, Inđija
Attendance: 300
Referee: Rhona Daly (Ireland)
27 October 2013
13:00

Israel	2–0	Malta
Sofer 51'; Shelina 60'	Report

Ramat Gan Stadium, Ramat Gan
Attendance: 110
Referee: Hilal Tuba Tosun (Turkey)

31 October 2013
14:00

Serbia	1–2	Iceland
M. Ilić 68'	Report	Vidarsdóttir 19'; Ómarsdóttir 43'

FK Obilić Stadium, Belgrade
Attendance: 250
Referee: Anastasia Pustovoitova (Russia)
31 October 2013
18:00

Denmark	0–1	Switzerland
	Report	Bachmann 26'

Vejle Stadion, Vejle
Attendance: 1,921
Referee: Pernilla Larsson (Sweden)

24 November 2013
14:00

Malta	0–5	Denmark
	Report	S. Nielsen 7'; Nadim 26', 66'; Harder 34'; K. Nielsen 86'

Ta' Qali National Stadium, Ta' Qali
Attendance: 330
Referee: Sofia Karagiorgi (Cyprus)
24 November 2013
18:00

Israel	3–1	Serbia
Fridman 26'; Falkon 38'; Sofer 67'	Report	Podovac 3' (pen.)

HaMoshava Stadium, Petah Tikva
Attendance: 270
Referee: Marija Kurtes (Germany)

12 February 2014
16:00

Israel	0–5	Switzerland
	Report	Humm 6', 28', 36'; Dickenmann 45' (pen.); Crnogorčević 90+3'

HaMoshava Stadium, Petah Tikva
Attendance: 100
Referee: Teodora Albon (Romania)
13 February 2014
14:00

Malta	0–3	Serbia
	Report	Damnjanović 3'; Čubrilo 38'; Čanković 84'

Ta' Qali National Stadium, Ta' Qali
Attendance: 250
Referee: Zuzana Štrpková (Slovakia)

5 April 2014
16:00

Switzerland	11–0	Malta
Bachmann 4'; Dickenmann 13', 45+4', 90+3'; Moser 17', 62'; Remund 31'; Abbé 39'; Kiwic 41'; Humm 59', 85'	Report

Herti Allmend Stadion, Zug
Attendance: 1,040
Referee: Vesna Budimir (Croatia)
5 April 2014
19:30

Israel	0–1	Iceland
	Report	Brynjarsdóttir 60'

Ramat Gan Stadium, Ramat Gan
Attendance: 100
Referee: Monika Mularczyk (Poland)

10 April 2014
14:00

Malta	0–8	Iceland
	Report	Þorsteinsdóttir 2', 23', 60'; Lárusdóttir 15'; Brynjarsdóttir 33', 90+4'; Friðriksdóttir 64'; Óladóttir 87'

Ta' Qali National Stadium, Ta' Qali
Attendance: 250
Referee: Sjoukje de Jong (Netherlands)
10 April 2014
19:00

Switzerland	1–1	Denmark
Dickenmann 64' (pen.)	Report	Røddik 51'

Stadion Brügglifeld, Aarau
Attendance: 1,902
Referee: Cristina Dorcioman (Romania)

7 May 2014
14:00

Malta	0–3 Awarded (Note: Israel were awarded a 3–0 win after Malta fielding an ineligible player Dorianne Theuma. The match originally ended 2–0 to Israel.)	Israel
	Report	M. Fridman 36'; Lavi 60'

Ta' Qali National Stadium, Ta' Qali
Attendance: 157
Referee: Olga Zadinová (Czech Republic)
8 May 2014
19:00

Switzerland	3–0	Iceland
Bernauer 33'; Bürki 69'; Dickenmann 80'	Report

Centre sportif de Colovray Nyon, Nyon
Attendance: 1,350
Referee: Kateryna Monzul (Ukraine)
8 May 2014
20:30

Denmark	3–1	Serbia
Rasmussen 9' (pen.); Knudsen 10'; Christiansen 83'	Report	Podovac 58' (pen.)

Vejle Stadion, Vejle
Attendance: 726
Referee: Stéphanie Frappart (France)

14 June 2014
16:00

Switzerland	9–0	Israel
Humm 29'; Kiwic 32'; Bachmann 35', 39'; Moser 37'; Bürki 59', 84', 86'; Abbé 90+1'	Report

Stadion Niedermatten, Wohlen
Attendance: 950
Referee: Katalin Kulcsár (Hungary)
14 June 2014
17:30

Serbia	5–0	Malta
I. Ilić 4'; Čanković 28'; Savanović 42'; Krstić 67', 74'	Report

Inđija Stadium, Inđija
Attendance: 350
Referee: Zuzana Kováčová (Slovakia)
15 June 2014
13:00

Denmark	1–1	Iceland
Rasmussen 35'	Report	Lárusdóttir 28'

Vejle Stadion, Vejle
Attendance: 933
Referee: Riem Hussein (Germany)

19 June 2014
17:00

Israel	0–5	Denmark
	Report	Nielsen 35', 86'; Harder 48'; Troelsgaard 56'; Pedersen 90+3'

Ramat Gan Stadium, Ramat Gan
Attendance: 150
Referee: Morag Pirie (Scotland)
19 June 2014
17:30

Serbia	0–7	Switzerland
	Report	Bachmann 5'; Dickenmann 21', 51'; Moser 48'; Crnogorčević 60'; Humm 76'; Betschart 81'

Inđija Stadium, Inđija
Attendance: 250
Referee: Eleni Lampadariou (Greece)
19 June 2014
21:15

Iceland	5–0	Malta
Magnúsdóttir 12'; Jensen 20', 86'; Lárusdóttir 40'; Brynjarsdóttir 64'	Report

Laugardalsvöllur, Reykjavík
Attendance: 579
Referee: Séverine Zinck (France)

21 August 2014
17:00

Serbia	3–0	Israel
Smiljković 31', 34'; Bradić 82'	Report

Suvača Sportcenter, Pećinci
Attendance: 200
Referee: Aneliya Sinabova (Bulgaria)
21 August 2014
21:30

Iceland	0–1	Denmark
	Report	Harder 58'

Laugardalsvöllur, Reykjavík
Attendance: 3,395
Referee: Teodora Albon (Romania)

13 September 2014
14:15

Denmark	8–0	Malta
Røddik 5' (pen.), 89'; Rasmussen 17', 50'; Knudsen 27'; Nadim 28', 67'; Sørensen 45+1'	Report

Vejle Stadion, Vejle
Attendance: 755
Referee: Elia Martínez (Spain)
13 September 2014
19:00

Iceland	3–0	Israel
Brynjarsdóttir 2'; Friðriksdóttir 26'; Gunnarsdóttir 90+1'	Report

Laugardalsvöllur, Reykjavík
Attendance: 622
Referee: Gyöngyi Gaál (Hungary)

17 September 2014
17:00

Malta	0–5	Switzerland
	Report	Crnogorčević 10', 84', 87' (pen.); Bürki 52', 68'

Victor Tedesco Stadium, Ħamrun
Attendance: 200
Referee: Gordana Kuzmanović (Serbia)
17 September 2014
18:00

Denmark	0–1	Israel
	Report	Falkon 10'

Vejle Stadion, Vejle
Attendance: 657
Referee: Anastasia Pustovoitova (Russia)
17 September 2014
22:00

Iceland	9–1	Serbia
Þorsteinsdóttir 7', 71'; Viggósdóttir 10'; Hönnudóttir 27', 72'; Ásgrímsdóttir 58'; Brynjarsdóttir 63', 84'; Helgadóttir 67' (pen.)	Report	Čubrilo 60'

Laugardalsvöllur, Reykjavík
Attendance: 753
Referee: Efthalia Mitsi (Greece)

== Goalscorers ==
10 goals

- (Switzerland) Lara Dickenmann

9 goals

- (Switzerland) Ana-Maria Crnogorčević

8 goals

- (Switzerland) Ramona Bachmann

7 goals

- (Iceland) Dagný Brynjarsdóttir
- (Switzerland) Vanessa Bürki
- (Switzerland) Fabienne Humm

5 goals

- (Iceland) Harpa Þorsteinsdóttir

4 goals

- (Denmark) Pernille Harder
- (Denmark) Nadia Nadim
- (Denmark) Johanna Rasmussen
- (Switzerland) Martina Moser

3 goals

- (Denmark) Line Røddik Hansen
- (Denmark) Karoline Smidt Nielsen
- (Iceland) Dóra María Lárusdóttir
- (Serbia) Jelena Čubrilo

2 goals

- (Denmark) Mariann Gajhede Knudsen
- (Denmark) Sanne Troelsgaard Nielsen
- (Iceland) Fanndís Friðriksdóttir
- (Iceland) Elín Jensen
- (Israel) Lee Falkon
- (Israel) Moran Fridman
- (Israel) Daniel Sofer
- (Serbia) Jelena Čanković
- (Serbia) Tijana Krstić
- (Serbia) Danka Podovac
- (Switzerland) Caroline Abbé
- (Switzerland) Rahel Kiwic

1 goal

- (Denmark) Nanna Christiansen
- (Denmark) Sofie Junge Pedersen
- (Denmark) Simone Boye Sørensen
- (Iceland) Arna Ásgrímsdóttir
- (Iceland) Sara Björk Gunnarsdóttir
- (Iceland) Þóra Björg Helgadóttir
- (Iceland) Rakel Hönnudóttir
- (Iceland) Gudmunda Brynja Óladóttir
- (Iceland) Katrín Ómarsdóttir
- (Iceland) Hólmfríður Magnúsdóttir
- (Iceland) Margrét Lára Viðarsdóttir
- (Iceland) Glódís Perla Viggósdóttir
- Rachel Shelina Israel
- (Israel) Moran Lavi
- (Serbia) Biljana Bradić
- (Serbia) Jovana Damnjanović
- (Serbia) Indira Ilić
- (Serbia) Marija Ilić
- (Serbia) Aleksandra Savanović
- (Serbia) Vesna Smiljković
- (Switzerland) Vanessa Bernauer
- (Switzerland) Sandra Betschart
- (Switzerland) Nicole Remund
- (Switzerland) Lia Wälti
