= 2015 FIFA Women's World Cup qualification – UEFA preliminary round =

Football tournament qualification stage

The 2015 FIFA Women's World Cup qualification UEFA preliminary round was the UEFA qualifying preliminary round for the 2015 FIFA Women's World Cup.

The eight lowest teams entered the tournament in the preliminary round were drawn into two groups of four. The two best placed teams in each group advanced to the next round where they competed among the other thirty-eight teams entered. The preliminary round was drawn on 18 December 2012. Malta and Lithuania as hosts were the only seeded teams. Matches were played from 4 to 9 April 2013.

== Tiebreakers ==
If two or more teams were equal on points on completion of the group matches, the following tie-breaking criteria were applied:

1. Higher number of points obtained in the matches played between the teams in question;
2. Superior goal difference resulting from the matches played between the teams in question;
3. Higher number of goals scored in the matches played between the teams in question;
4. If, after having applied criteria 1 to 3, teams still have an equal ranking, criteria 1 to 3 are reapplied exclusively to the matches between the teams in question to determine their final rankings. If this procedure does not lead to a decision, criteria 5 to 9 apply;
5. Superior goal difference in all group matches;
6. Higher number of goals scored in all group matches;
7. If only two teams have the same number of points, and they are tied according to criteria 1–6 after having met in the last round of the group stage, their ranking is determined by a penalty shoot-out (this criterion is not used if more than two teams have the same number of points).
8. Position in the UEFA national team coefficient ranking system.

All times are CEST (UTC+02:00).

== Group A ==
Pos	Team	Pld	W	D	L	GF	GA	GD	Pts	Qualification	Malta	Albania	Latvia	Luxembourg
1	Malta (H)	3	2	1	0	9	1	+8	7	Group stage	—	—	—	6–0
2	Albania	3	2	1	0	5	2	+3	7	Group stage	1–1	—	2–0	—
3	Latvia	3	0	1	2	0	4	−4	1		0–2	—	—	—
4	Luxembourg	3	0	1	2	1	8	−7	1		—	1–2	0–0	—

Source: UEFA
Rules for classification: Tiebreakers
(H) Hosts
4 April 2013
16:00

Albania	1–1	Malta
Curo 76'	Report	Theuma 80'

Ta' Qali National Stadium, Ta' Qali
Attendance: 120
Referee: Petra Chudá (Slovakia)
4 April 2013
18:30

Luxembourg	0–0	Latvia
	Report

Ta' Qali National Stadium, Ta' Qali
Attendance: 50
Referee: Floarea Ionescu (Romania)

6 April 2013
11:00

Albania	2–0	Latvia
Memedov 17'; Velaj 41'	Report

Ta' Qali National Stadium, Ta' Qali
Attendance: 40
Referee: Yuliya Medvedeva-Keldyusheva (Kazakhstan)
6 April 2013
13:30

Malta	6–0	Luxembourg
Carabott 12'; Theuma 25' (pen.), 61'; Cuschieri 28'; Xuerreb 29'; Buttigieg 50'	Report

Ta' Qali National Stadium, Ta' Qali
Attendance: 130
Referee: Floarea Ionescu (Romania)

9 April 2013
16:00

Luxembourg	1–2	Albania
Maurer 45'	Report	Jashari 16'; Velaj 69'

Ta' Qali National Stadium, Ta' Qali
Attendance: 40
Referee: Petra Chudá (Slovakia)
9 April 2013
18:30

Latvia	0–2	Malta
	Report	Theuma 45+1'; Cuschieri 83'

Ta' Qali National Stadium, Ta' Qali
Attendance: 210
Referee: Yuliya Medvedeva-Keldyusheva (Kazakhstan)

== Group B ==
Pos	Team	Pld	W	D	L	GF	GA	GD	Pts	Qualification	Faroe Islands	Montenegro	Georgia	Lithuania
1	Faroe Islands	3	2	1	0	6	4	+2	7	Group stage	—	3–3	2–1	—
2	Montenegro	3	1	2	0	6	4	+2	5	Group stage	—	—	—	1–1
3	Georgia	3	1	0	2	5	7	−2	3		—	0–2	—	4–3
4	Lithuania (H)	3	0	1	2	4	6	−2	1		0–1	—	—	—

Source: UEFA
Rules for classification: Tiebreakers
(H) Hosts
4 April 2013
13:00

Faroe Islands	3–3	Montenegro
H. Sevdal 49', 76'; Magnussen 51'	Report	Vukčević 18', 66'; Kuć 59'

LFF Stadium, Vilnius
Attendance: 30
Referee: Linn Andersson (Sweden)
4 April 2013
17:30

Georgia	4–3	Lithuania
Pasikashvili 32', 85'; Chkonia 39'; Matveeva 60'	Report	Vanagaitė 9'; Bložytė 17'; Mažukelyte 82'

LFF Stadium, Vilnius
Attendance: 250
Referee: Paloma Quintero Siles (Spain)

6 April 2013
13:00

Georgia	0–2	Montenegro
	Report	Vukčević 38', 90+4'

LFF Stadium, Vilnius
Attendance: 10
Referee: Dilan Gökçek (Turkey)
6 April 2013
17:30

Lithuania	0–1	Faroe Islands
	Report	Andreasen 61'

LFF Stadium, Vilnius
Attendance: 262
Referee: Paloma Quintero Siles (Spain)

9 April 2013
13:00

Faroe Islands	2–1	Georgia
H. Sevdal 38', 73'	Report	Chichinadze 47'

LFF Stadium, Vilnius
Attendance: 12
Referee: Dilan Gökçek (Turkey)
9 April 2013
17:30

Montenegro	1–1	Lithuania
Vukčević 60'	Report	Vanagaitė 90+1'

LFF Stadium, Vilnius
Attendance: 130
Referee: Linn Andersson (Sweden)

== Goalscorers ==
5 goals

- (Montenegro) Marija Vukčević

4 goals

- (Faroe Islands) Heidi Sevdal
- (Malta) Dorianne Theuma

2 goals

- (Albania) Furtuna Velaj
- (Georgia (country)) Nino Pasikashvili
- (Lithuania) Sonata Vanagaitė
- (Malta) Rachel Cuschieri

1 goal

- (Albania) Ellvana Curo
- (Albania) Suada Jashari
- (Albania) Dafina Memedov
- (Faroe Islands) Rannvá Andreasen
- (Faroe Islands) Íðunn Magnussen
- (Georgia (country)) Lela Chichinadze
- (Georgia (country)) Khatia Chkonia
- (Georgia (country)) Tatiana Matveeva
- (Lithuania) Raimonda Bložytė
- (Lithuania) Rita Mažukelyte
- (Luxembourg) Sophie Maurer
- (Malta) Nicole Buttigieg
- (Malta) Ylenia Carabott
- (Malta) Emma Xuerreb
- (Montenegro) Armisa Kuć
