= UEFA Women's Euro 2013 qualifying Group 6 =

Football tournament qualification stage

The UEFA Women's Euro 2013 qualifying – Group 6 was contested by five teams competing for one automatic spot in the final tournament. The numbers 2 from all the groups were ranked with the best also automatically qualifying. While the others entered play-offs. Netherlands ranked top of the numbers 2 and also qualified for the final tournament straight out of the group.

== Standings ==
Team qualified for UEFA Women's Euro 2013

Team	Pld	W	D	L	GF	GA	GD	Pts
England	8	6	2	0	22	2	+20	20
Netherlands	8	6	1	1	20	2	+18	19
Serbia	8	4	1	3	15	18	−3	13
Slovenia	8	1	1	6	6	21	−15	4
Croatia	8	0	1	7	6	26	−20	1

Source: UEFA.com

== Fixtures ==
All times are UTC+2.

17 September 2011
16:00

Serbia	2–2	England
Podovac 55'; Smiljković 90+4'	Report	Yankey 6'; Slović 19' (o.g.)

Omladinski Stadium, Belgrade
Attendance: 200
Referee: Sandra Braz Bastos (Portugal)

21 September 2011
19:30

Netherlands	6–0	Serbia
Melis 1', 71', 78', 90+3' van den Berg 65'; Hoogendijk 77'	Report

TATA Steel Stadion, Velsen-Zuid
Attendance: 2,018
Referee: Hilal Tuba Tosun (Turkey)

22 September 2011
20:30

England	4–0	Slovenia
Yankey 1'; White 5'; Houghton 56'; Williams 88'	Report

County Ground, Swindon
Attendance: 3,878
Referee: Karolina Radzik-Johan (Poland)

22 October 2011
15:30

Croatia	0–3	Netherlands
	Report	Melis 50' van de Ven 52'; Smit 72'

Gradski Stadion, Vrbovec
Attendance: 300
Referee: Katalin Kulcsár (Hungary)
22 October 2011
18:00

Slovenia	1–2	Serbia
Stojkanović 75' (o.g.)	Report	Smiljković 8'; Sretenović 73'

Sports Park, Domžale
Attendance: 850
Referee: Lilach Asulin (Israel)

27 October 2011
14:30

Croatia	3–3	Slovenia
Juko 56'; Glavać 90+2'; Lojna 90+5'	Report	Scurich 20' (o.g.); Vrabel 54'; Žganec 66'

Gradski stadion, Vrbovec
Attendance: 350
Referee: Esther Azzopardi (Malta)
27 October 2011
19:30

Netherlands	0–0	England
	Report

Oosterenkstadion, Zwolle
Attendance: 8,800
Referee: Bibiana Steinhaus (Germany)

19 November 2011
13:00

Serbia	4–2	Croatia
Sretenović 45+2'; Radojičić 51', 71'; Podovac 75' (pen.)	Report	Kolar 27', 79'

Stadion Srem Jakovo, Jakovo
Attendance: 400
Referee: Christine Baitinger (Germany)
19 November 2011
14:00

Slovenia	0–2	Netherlands
	Report	van de Ven 31' de Ridder 90'

Ivančna Gorica Stadium, Ivančna Gorica
Attendance: 230
Referee: Petra Chudá (Slovakia)

23 November 2011
20:30

England	2–0	Serbia
Clarke 41'; White 51'	Report

Keepmoat Stadium, Doncaster
Attendance: 4,112
Referee: Natalia Avdonchenko (Russia)

24 November 2011
19:30

Netherlands	2–0	Croatia
de Ridder 7'; Spitse 13'	Report

Kyocera Stadion, The Hague
Attendance: 7,250
Referee: Sandra Braz Bastos (Portugal)

31 March 2012
14:30

Croatia	0–6	England
	Report	Williams 4'; Clarke 15'; Unitt 18'; White 35'; Houghton 45', 68'

Gradski stadion, Vrbovec
Attendance: 1,000
Referee: Petra Chudá (Slovakia)

5 April 2012
19:30

Netherlands	3–1	Slovenia
Heuver 8' van de Ven 70'; Melis 81'	Report	Zver 31'

De Koel, Venlo
Attendance: 3,500
Referee: Marte Sørø (Norway)

16 June 2012
17:30

Croatia	1–4	Serbia
Šalek 67'	Report	Smiljković 40'; Slović 43'; Radojičić 47'; Pešić 71' (pen.)

Gradski stadion, Vrbovec
Attendance: 600
Referee: Gyöngyi Gaál (Hungary)

17 June 2012
18:15

England	1–0	Netherlands
Yankey 67'	Report

Salford City Stadium, Manchester
Attendance: 5,505
Referee: Jenny Palmqvist (Sweden)

20 June 2012
17:00

Serbia	0–4	Netherlands
	Report	Melis 21', 41'; Martens 51' van de Donk 58'

Stadion Srem Jakovo, Jakovo
Attendance: 300
Referee: Carina Vitulano (Italy)

21 June 2012
20:00

Slovenia	0–4	England
	Report	Scott 29', 34'; Carney 54'; Williams 85'

Ob Jezeru, Velenje
Attendance: 800
Referee: Katalin Kulcsár (Hungary)

15 September 2012
20:00

Slovenia	1–0	Croatia
Eržen 19'	Report

Lendava Sports Park, Lendava
Attendance: 565
Referee: Marianne Svendsen (Denmark)

19 September 2012
16:30

Serbia	3–0	Slovenia
Podovac 35' (pen.), 79'; Nešić 52'	Report

Inđija Stadium, Inđija
Attendance: 200
Referee: Marina Mamaeva (Russia)
19 September 2012
18:00

England	3–0	Croatia
J. Scott 21'; Aluko 47'; Stoney 80'	Report

Bescot Stadium, Walsall
Attendance: 5,821
Referee: Esther Azzopardi (Malta)

== Goalscorers ==
8 goals

- (Netherlands) Manon Melis

4 goals

- (Serbia) Danka Podovac

3 goals

- (England) Steph Houghton
- (England) Jill Scott
- (England) Ellen White
- (England) Rachel Williams
- (England) Rachel Yankey
- (Netherlands) Kirsten van de Ven
- (Serbia) Marija Radojičić
- (Serbia) Vesna Smiljković

2 goals

- (Croatia) Katarina Kolar
- (England) Jessica Clarke
- (Netherlands) Chantal de Ridder
- (Serbia) Jovana Sretenović

1 goal

- (Croatia) Petra Glavać
- (Croatia) Dušanka Juko
- (Croatia) Izabela Lojna
- (Croatia) Martina Šalek
- (England) Eniola Aluko
- (England) Karen Carney
- (England) Casey Stoney
- (England) Rachel Unitt
- (Netherlands) Maayke Heuver
- (Netherlands) Anouk Hoogendijk
- (Netherlands) Lieke Martens
- (Netherlands) Sylvia Smit
- (Netherlands) Sherida Spitse
- (Netherlands) Daniëlle van de Donk
- (Netherlands) Mandy van den Berg
- (Serbia) Marina Nešić
- (Serbia) Milena Pešić
- (Serbia) Violeta Slović
- (Slovenia) Kaja Eržen
- (Slovenia) Tanja Vrabel
- (Slovenia) Urška Žganec
- (Slovenia) Mateja Zver

1 own goal

- (Croatia) Allison Scurich (playing against Slovenia)
- (Serbia) Violeta Slović (playing against England)
- (Serbia) Lidija Stojkanović (playing against Slovenia)
