= Katarina Kolar =

Croatian football striker (born 1989)

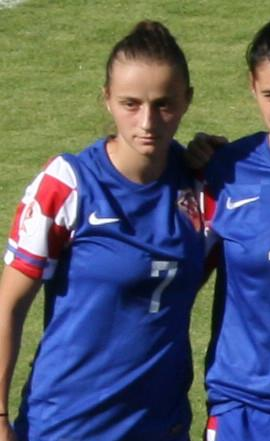

Personal information
- Date of birth: 25 November 1989 (age 36)
- Place of birth: Bogilice, SFR Yugoslavia
- Position: Forward

Team information
- Current team: BV Cloppenburg

Senior career*
Years	Team	Apps	(Gls)
2005–2009	ŽNK Osijek		
2009–2010	Austria Kärnten		
2010–2011	ŽNK Plamen		
2011–2012	ŽNK Dinamo-Maksimir		
2012–2014	Zagłębie Lubin		
2014–	BV Cloppenburg		

International career^{‡}
2005–2007	Croatia U19	13	(8)
2006–	Croatia	38	(14)
- * Club domestic league appearances and goals ‡ National team caps and goals as of 17 September 2014

Katarina Kolar is a Croatian football striker currently playing for BV Cloppenburg in the 2. Bundesliga and the Croatian national team. She has also played for ŽNK Osijek and Plamen Križevci in Croatia and Austria Kärnten in the Austrian Frauenliga.

== International career ==
Kolar made her international senior debut on 16 in October 2006 in a 3-0 friendly win over Macedonia. She is the Croatian team's top scorer with 14 goals as of September 2014.

=== International goals ===
#	Date	Venue	Opponent	Score	Result	Competition
1.	2 July 2008	Rakvere, Estonia	Estonia	1–0	3–1	Tournament
2.	2 July 2008	Rakvere, Estonia	Estonia	2–0	3–1	Tournament
3.	2 July 2008	Rakvere, Estonia	Estonia	3–0	3–1	Tournament
4.	15 December 2008	Adapazarı, Turkey	Turkey	2–1	2–2	Tournament
5.	17 December 2008	Adapazarı, Turkey	Latvia	1–0	3–0	Tournament
6.	17 December 2008	Adapazarı, Turkey	Latvia	2–0	3–0	Tournament
7.	17 December 2008	Adapazarı, Turkey	Latvia	3–0	3–0	Tournament
8.	11 April 2009	Virje, Croatia	Faroe Islands	1–0	1–3	Tournament
9.	13 April 2009	Molve, Croatia	Lithuania	4–0	6–0	Tournament
10.	16 April 2009	Koprivnica, Croatia	Bosnia and Herzegovina	1–0	3–2	Tournament
11.	16 April 2009	Koprivnica, Croatia	Bosnia and Herzegovina	2–2	3–2	Tournament
12.	20 August 2011	Županja, Croatia	Bosnia and Herzegovina	1–0	1–1	Friendly match
13.	19 November 2011	Jakovo, Serbia	Serbia	1–0	2–4	UEFA Women's Euro 2013 qualifying
14.	19 November 2011	Jakovo, Serbia	Serbia	2–4	2–4	UEFA Women's Euro 2013 qualifying

Goals scored for the Croatian WNT in official competitions
Competition	Stage	Date	Location	Opponent	Goals	Result	Overall
2013 UEFA Euro	Qualifiers	2011–11–19	Jakovo	Serbia	2	2–4	2
2015 FIFA World Cup	Qualifiers	2013–09–26	Sinj	Republic of Ireland	1	1–1	1
