= 2015 FIFA Women's World Cup qualification (CONMEBOL–CONCACAF play-off) =

- Event: 2015 FIFA Women's World Cup qualification
Ecuador	Trinidad and Tobago
(Ecuador)	(Trinidad and Tobago)
1	0
- on aggregate

First leg
Ecuador	Trinidad and Tobago
0	0
- Date: 8 November 2014
- Venue: Estadio Olímpico Atahualpa, Quito
- Referee: Bibiana Steinhaus (Germany)

Second leg
Trinidad and Tobago	Ecuador
0	1
- Date: 2 December 2014
- Venue: Hasely Crawford Stadium, Port of Spain
- Referee: Esther Staubli (Switzerland)

In the 2015 FIFA Women's World Cup qualification process, one spot was allocated to the winner of a two-legged play-off between the fourth-placed team from CONCACAF and the third-placed team from CONMEBOL.

== Qualified teams ==
Confederation	Placement	Team
CONMEBOL	2014 Copa América Femenina 3rd place	Ecuador
CONCACAF	2014 CONCACAF Women's Championship 4th place	Trinidad and Tobago

== Summary ==
The draw for the order of legs was held in Zürich on 22 July 2014. Ecuador hosted the first leg on 8 November 2014, and Trinidad and Tobago hosted the second leg on 2 December 2014.

Team 1	Agg.	Team 2	1st leg	2nd leg
Ecuador	1–0	Trinidad and Tobago	0–0	1–0

== Matches ==
8 November 2014
14:00 UTC−5

Ecuador	0–0	Trinidad and Tobago
	Report (CONCACAF); Report (CONMEBOL)

Estadio Olímpico Atahualpa, Quito
Referee: Bibiana Steinhaus (Germany)
2 December 2014
18:00 UTC−4

Trinidad and Tobago	0–1	Ecuador
	Report (CONCACAF); Report (CONMEBOL)	Quinteros 90+1'

Hasely Crawford Stadium, Port of Spain
Referee: Esther Staubli (Switzerland)

Ecuador won 1–0 on aggregate and qualified for 2015 FIFA Women's World Cup.

== Goalscorers ==
There was 1 goal scored in 2 matches, for an average of 0.5 goals per match.

1 goal

- (Ecuador) Mónica Quinteros
