= Lauryn Hutchinson =

Trinidad and Tobago footballer (born 1991)

Personal information
- Date of birth: 12 June 1991 (age 35)
- Place of birth: Sterling, Virginia, United States
- Height: 1.70 m (5 ft 7 in)
- Position: Forward

Youth career
- Dominion Titans

College career
Years	Team	Apps	(Gls)
2009–2011	VCU Rams	40	(2)

International career^{‡}
2010–2022	Trinidad and Tobago	37	(5)

Managerial career
- 2025–: VCU Rams
- ‡ National team caps and goals as of 11 July 2022

Lauryn Hutchinson (born 12 June 1991) is a former footballer who played as a forward. Born in the United States, she represented Trinidad and Tobago at international level. She is currently the head coach of the VCU Rams.

== International goals ==
Scores and results list Trinidad and Tobago' goal tally first.

No.	Date	Venue	Opponent	Score	Result	Competition
1	24 October 2014	PPL Park, Chester, United States	Costa Rica	1–1	1–1	2014 CONCACAF Women's Championship
2	15 November 2015	Ato Boldon Stadium, Couva, Trinidad and Tobago	Saint Lucia	2–0	8–1	2016 CONCACAF Women's Olympic Qualifying Championship qualification
3	15 November 2015	Ato Boldon Stadium, Couva, Trinidad and Tobago	Saint Lucia	3–0	8–1	2016 CONCACAF Women's Olympic Qualifying Championship qualification

== Coaching career ==
Wilson was announced as the head coach of the VCU Rams on 12 February 2025. She previously worked as a professional trainer, and with various youth soccer programs.

== Personal life ==
Born in the United States, Hutchinson is of Trinidad and Tobago descent through her father. She is openly lesbian. She married fellow footballer Eli Beard, an Israel international, on 24 December 2024.
