= Íðunn Magnussen =

Faroese footballer (born 1993)

Personal information
- Full name: Íðunn Magnussen
- Date of birth: 15 August 1993 (age 33)
- Place of birth: Faroe Islands
- Position: Midfielder

Team information
- Current team: EB/Streymur/Skála

Senior career*
Years	Team	Apps	(Gls)
2009–2012	EB/Streymur	32	(17)
2012–	EB/Streymur/Skála	62	(39)

International career^{‡}
2008–2009	Faroe Islands U17	8	(0)
2009–2011	Faroe Islands U19	11	(1)
2012–	Faroe Islands	14	(2)
- * Club domestic league appearances and goals as of 00:01, 01 January 2017 (UTC) ‡ National team caps and goals as of 00:01, 01 January 2017 (UTC)

Íðunn Magnussen (born 15 August 1993) is a Faroese football midfielder who currently plays for EB/Streymur/Skála.

== Honours ==
EB/Streymur/Skála

Runners-up

- 1. deild kvinnur (2): 2013, 2014

== International goals ==
Scores and results list Faroe Islands' goal tally first.

#	Date	Venue	Opponent	Score	Result	Competition	Source
1	28 November 2012	Stade Jos Haupert, Niederkorn, Luxembourg	Luxembourg	2–0	6–0	Friendly	
2	4 April 2013	LFF Stadium, Vilnius, Lithuania	Montenegro	2–1	3–3	2015 FIFA Women's World Cup qualification – UEFA preliminary round	
