= 2015 FIFA Women's World Cup qualification (UEFA) =

Tournament details
- Dates: 4 April 2013 – 14 October 2014
- Teams: 46 (from 1 confederation)

Tournament statistics
- Matches played: 228
- Goals scored: 965 (4.23 per match)
- Top scorer: (Netherlands) Vivianne Miedema (16 goals)

The European qualifying for the 2015 FIFA Women's World Cup was a women's football tournament organized by UEFA. A record 46 entrants were competing for eight spots. For the first time Albania and Montenegro entered a senior competitive tournament. The first matches were held on 4 April 2013.

== Preliminary round ==
The eight lowest teams entered the tournament in the preliminary round were drawn into two groups of four. The two best placed teams in each group advanced to the next round where they competed among the other thirty-eight teams entered. The preliminary round was drawn on 18 December 2012. Malta and Lithuania as hosts were the only seeded teams. Matches were played from 4 to 9 April 2013.

=== Group A ===
Pos	Team	Pld	W	D	L	GF	GA	GD	Pts	Qualification	Malta	Albania	Latvia	Luxembourg
1	Malta (H)	3	2	1	0	9	1	+8	7	Group stage	—	—	—	6–0
2	Albania	3	2	1	0	5	2	+3	7	Group stage	1–1	—	2–0	—
3	Latvia	3	0	1	2	0	4	−4	1		0–2	—	—	—
4	Luxembourg	3	0	1	2	1	8	−7	1		—	1–2	0–0	—

Source: UEFA
(H) Hosts

=== Group B ===
Pos	Team	Pld	W	D	L	GF	GA	GD	Pts	Qualification	Faroe Islands	Montenegro	Georgia	Lithuania
1	Faroe Islands	3	2	1	0	6	4	+2	7	Group stage	—	3–3	2–1	—
2	Montenegro	3	1	2	0	6	4	+2	5	Group stage	—	—	—	1–1
3	Georgia	3	1	0	2	5	7	−2	3		—	0–2	—	4–3
4	Lithuania (H)	3	0	1	2	4	6	−2	1		0–1	—	—	—

Source: UEFA
(H) Hosts

== Group stage ==
The group stage draw was made on 16 April 2013. Teams played each other twice, once at home and once away. Matches were played from 20 September 2013 to 17 September 2014. All seven group winners advanced directly to the final tournament, while the four runners-up with the best record against the sides first, third, fourth, and fifth in their groups advanced to play-off matches on 25/26 and 29/30 October and 22/23 and 26/27 November 2014 for the remaining berth.

=== Seeding ===
Seeding was based on results in three tournaments, the UEFA Women's Euro 2009 qualifying, 2011 FIFA Women's World Cup and the UEFA Women's Euro 2013 qualifying, each with their qualification results included.

Pot A	Pot B	Pot C	Pot D	Pot E	Pot F
**Germany**; **Sweden**; **France**; **England**; **Norway**; Italy; Denmark	Iceland; Finland; Russia; **Netherlands**; **Spain**; Scotland; Ukraine	**Switzerland**; Poland; Czech Republic; Austria; Belgium; Republic of Ireland; Belarus	Hungary; Serbia; Romania; Portugal; Wales; Slovakia; Northern Ireland	Slovenia; Greece; Turkey; Bosnia and Herzegovina; Bulgaria; Israel; Estonia	Kazakhstan; Croatia; Macedonia; Malta; Faroe Islands; Albania; Montenegro

We report in bold the teams which actually qualified to the 2015 FIFA Women's World Cup.

=== Tiebreakers ===
If two or more teams are equal on points on completion of the group matches, the following tie-breaking criteria are applied:

1. Higher number of points obtained in the matches played between the teams in question;
2. Superior goal difference resulting from the matches played between the teams in question;
3. Higher number of goals scored in the matches played between the teams in question;
4. Higher number of goals scored away from home in the matches played between the teams in question;
5. If, after having applied criteria 1 to 4, teams still have an equal ranking, criteria 1 to 4 are reapplied exclusively to the matches between the teams in question to determine their final rankings. If this procedure does not lead to a decision, criteria 6 to 10 apply;
6. Superior goal difference in all group matches;
7. Higher number of goals scored in all group matches;
8. Higher number of away goals scored in all group matches;
9. Position in the UEFA national team coefficient ranking system;

=== Group 1 ===
Pos	Team	Pld	W	D	L	GF	GA	GD	Pts	Qualification	Germany	Russia	Ireland	Croatia	Slovenia	Slovakia
1	Germany	10	10	0	0	62	4	+58	30	Women's World Cup	—	9–0	2–0	4–0	4–0	9–1
2	Russia	10	7	1	2	19	18	+1	22		1–4	—	0–0	1–0	4–1	3–1
3	Republic of Ireland	10	5	2	3	13	9	+4	17		2–3	1–3	—	1–0	2–0	2–0
4	Croatia	10	2	2	6	7	20	−13	8		0–8	1–3	1–1	—	1–0	0–1
5	Slovenia	10	2	0	8	7	34	−27	6		0–13	1–2	0–3	0–3	—	2–1
6	Slovakia	10	1	1	8	6	29	−23	4		0–6	0–2	0–1	1–1	1–3	—

Source: UEFA

=== Group 2 ===
Pos	Team	Pld	W	D	L	GF	GA	GD	Pts	Qualification	Spain	Italy	Czech Republic	Romania	Estonia	North Macedonia
1	Spain	10	9	1	0	42	2	+40	28	Women's World Cup	—	2–0	3–2	1–0	6–0	12–0
2	Italy	10	8	1	1	48	5	+43	25	Play-offs	0–0	—	6–1	1–0	4–0	15–0
3	Czech Republic	10	4	2	4	21	18	+3	14		0–1	0–4	—	0–0	6–0	5–2
4	Romania	10	3	2	5	18	11	+7	11		0–2	1–2	0–0	—	0–3 (Note: Estonia were awarded a 3–0 win. The match originally ended 2–0 to Romania.)	6–1
5	Estonia	10	2	1	7	8	33	−25	7		0–5	1–5	1–4	0–2	—	1–1
6	Macedonia	10	0	1	9	6	74	−68	1		0–10	0–11	1–3	1–9	0–2	—

Source: UEFA

=== Group 3 ===
Pos	Team	Pld	W	D	L	GF	GA	GD	Pts	Qualification	Switzerland	Iceland	Denmark	Israel	Serbia	Malta
1	Switzerland	10	9	1	0	53	1	+52	28	Women's World Cup	—	3–0	1–1	9–0	9–0	11–0
2	Iceland	10	6	1	3	29	9	+20	19		0–2	—	0–1	3–0	9–1	5–0
3	Denmark	10	5	3	2	25	6	+19	18		0–1	1–1	—	0–1	3–1	8–0
4	Israel	10	4	0	6	9	27	−18	12		0–5	0–1	0–5	—	3–1	2–0
5	Serbia	10	3	1	6	16	34	−18	10		0–7	1–2	1–1	3–0	—	5–0
6	Malta	10	0	0	10	0	55	−55	0		0–5	0–8	0–5	0–3 (Note: Israel were awarded a 3–0 win. The match originally ended 2–0 to Israel.)	0–3	—

Source: UEFA

=== Group 4 ===
Pos	Team	Pld	W	D	L	GF	GA	GD	Pts	Qualification	Sweden	Scotland	Poland	Bosnia and Herzegovina		Faroe Islands
1	Sweden	10	10	0	0	32	1	+31	30	Women's World Cup	—	2–0	2–0	3–0	3–0	5–0
2	Scotland	10	8	0	2	37	8	+29	24	Play-offs	1–3	—	2–0	7–0	2–0	9–0
3	Poland	10	5	1	4	20	14	+6	16		0–4	0–4	—	3–1	4–0	6–0
4	Bosnia and Herzegovina	10	2	3	5	7	19	−12	9		0–1	1–3	1–1	—	1–0	2–0
5	Northern Ireland	10	1	2	7	3	19	−16	5		0–4	0–2	0–3	0–0	—	3–0
6	Faroe Islands	10	0	2	8	3	41	−38	2		0–5	2–7	0–3	1–1	0–0	—

Source: UEFA

=== Group 5 ===
Pos	Team	Pld	W	D	L	GF	GA	GD	Pts	Qualification	Norway	Netherlands	Belgium	Portugal	Greece	Albania
1	Norway	10	9	0	1	41	5	+36	27	Women's World Cup	—	0–2	4–1	2–0	6–0	7–0
2	Netherlands	10	8	1	1	43	6	+37	25	Play-offs	1–2	—	1–1	3–2	7–0	10–1
3	Belgium	10	6	1	3	34	11	+23	19		1–2	0–2	—	4–1	11–0	2–0
4	Portugal	10	4	0	6	19	21	−2	12		0–2	0–7	0–1	—	1–0	7–1
5	Greece	10	1	0	9	6	49	−43	3 (Note: Greece scored more head-to-head goals than Albania)		0–5	0–6	1–7	1–5	—	4–0
6	Albania	10	1	0	9	3	54	−51	3		0–11	0–4	0–6	0–3	1–0	—

Source: UEFA

=== Group 6 ===
Pos	Team	Pld	W	D	L	GF	GA	GD	Pts	Qualification	England	Ukraine	Wales	Turkey	Belarus	Montenegro
1	England	10	10	0	0	52	1	+51	30	Women's World Cup	—	4–0	2–0	8–0	6–0	9–0
2	Ukraine	10	7	1	2	34	9	+25	22	Play-offs	1–2	—	1–0	8–0	8–0	7–0
3	Wales	10	6	1	3	18	9	+9	19		0–4	1–1	—	1–0	1–0	4–0
4	Turkey	10	4	0	6	12	31	−19	12		0–4	0–1	1–5	—	3–0	3–1
5	Belarus	10	2	0	8	12	31	−19	6		0–3	1–3	0–3	1–2	—	3–1
6	Montenegro	10	0	0	10	6	53	−47	0		0–10	1–4	0–3	2–3	1–7	—

Source: UEFA

=== Group 7 ===
Pos	Team	Pld	W	D	L	GF	GA	GD	Pts	Qualification	France	Austria	Finland	Hungary	Kazakhstan	Bulgaria
1	France	10	10	0	0	54	3	+51	30	Women's World Cup	—	3–1	3–1	4–0	7–0	14–0
2	Austria	10	7	0	3	31	14	+17	21 (Note: Austria scored more head-to-head goals than Finland)		1–3	—	3–1	4–3	5–1	4–0
3	Finland	10	7	0	3	27	9	+18	21		0–2	2–1	—	4–0	1–0	4–0
4	Hungary	10	4	0	6	20	25	−5	12		0–4	0–3	0–4	—	4–1	4–0
5	Kazakhstan	10	1	1	8	8	30	−22	4		0–4	0–3	0–2	1−2	—	4–1
6	Bulgaria	10	0	1	9	3	62	−59	1		0–10	1–6	0–8	0–7	1–1	—

Source: UEFA

=== Ranking of second-placed teams ===
Matches against the sixth-placed team in each group are not included in this ranking. As a result, eight matches played by each team counted for the purposes of the second-placed table.

The ranking of the runners-up is determined by the following parameters in this order:

1. Highest number of points
2. Goal difference
3. Highest number of goals scored
4. Highest number of away goals scored
5. Position in the UEFA national team coefficient ranking system;

Pos	Grp	Team	Pld	W	D	L	GF	GA	GD	Pts	Qualification
1	5	Netherlands	8	6	1	1	29	5	+24	19	Play-offs
2	2	Italy	8	6	1	1	22	5	+17	19	Play-offs
3	4	Scotland	8	6	0	2	21	6	+15	18	Play-offs
4	6	Ukraine	8	5	1	2	23	8	+15	16	Play-offs
5	1	Russia	8	5	1	2	14	17	−3	16	
6	7	Austria	8	5	0	3	21	13	+8	15	
7	3	Iceland	8	4	1	3	16	9	+7	13	

Source: UEFA
Rules for classification: 1) Points; 2) Goal difference; 3) Goals scored; 4) Away goals scored; 5) National team coefficient.

== Play-offs ==
After conclusion of the group stage the four runners-up with the best record against the sides first, third, fourth and fifth in their groups played home and away matches, to determine the last place in the FIFA World Cup.

The draw was held on 23 September 2014 at 14:00 local time at Nyon, Switzerland.

In the play-off draw, teams are seeded according to their UEFA Women's National Team Coefficient Ranking.

Seeded	Unseeded
Italy; Netherlands	Scotland; Ukraine

=== Semifinals ===
Team 1	Agg.	Team 2	1st leg	2nd leg
Scotland	1–4	Netherlands	1–2	0–2
Italy	4–3	Ukraine	2–1	2–2

=== Final ===
Team 1	Agg.	Team 2	1st leg	2nd leg
Netherlands	3–2	Italy	1–1	2–1
