= Marija Vukčević =

Montenegrin footballer (born 1986)

Personal information
- Full name: Marija Vukčević
- Date of birth: 26 April 1986 (age 40)
- Place of birth: Titograd, Yugoslavia
- Height: 1.73 m (5 ft 8 in)
- Position: Striker

Senior career*
| Years | Team | Apps | (Gls) |
- Mašinac Niš
- Real Marsico
- Res Roma

International career
| | Serbia and Montenegro | 35 | (16) |
| 2012– | Montenegro | 17 | (12) |
- * Club domestic league appearances and goals

Marija Vukčević is a Montenegrin football striker currently playing for ASD Res Roma in the Italian first tier. She formerly played in the Serbian First League for Mašinac Niš, with whom she also played the European Cup, and after that she played for ASD Real Marsico.

Vukčević also played for the Serbia and Montenegro national team until Montenegro declared its independence in 2006. Following the foundation of the Montenegro national team in 2012 she was appointed its captain. She scored in the team's first international.

== International goals ==
| No. | Date | Venue | Opponent | Score | Result | Competition |
|---|---|---|---|---|---|---|
| 1. | 13 March 2012 | Stadion Topolica, Bar, Montenegro | Bosnia and Herzegovina | ?–? | 2–3 | Friendly |
| 2. | 15 March 2012 | Podgorica, Montenegro | Bosnia and Herzegovina | 1–0 | 2–2 | Friendly |
| 3. | 15 March 2012 | Podgorica, Montenegro | Bosnia and Herzegovina | 2–2 | 2–2 | Friendly |
| 4. | 15 May 2012 | Stadion Topolica, Bar, Montenegro | Albania | ?–? | 2–4 | Friendly |
| 5. | 18 May 2012 | Shkoder, Albania | Albania | ?–? | 3–4 | Friendly |
| 6. | 4 April 2013 | LFF Stadium, Vilnius, Lithuania | Faroe Islands | 1–0 | 3–3 | 2015 FIFA Women's World Cup qualification |
| 7. | 4 April 2013 | LFF Stadium, Vilnius, Lithuania | Faroe Islands | 3–2 | 3–3 | 2015 FIFA Women's World Cup qualification |
| 8. | 6 April 2013 | LFF Stadium, Vilnius, Lithuania | Georgia | 1–0 | 2–0 | 2015 FIFA Women's World Cup qualification |
| 9. | 6 April 2013 | LFF Stadium, Vilnius, Lithuania | Georgia | 2–0 | 2–0 | 2015 FIFA Women's World Cup qualification |
| 10. | 9 April 2013 | LFF Stadium, Vilnius, Lithuania | Lithuania | 1–0 | 1–1 | 2015 FIFA Women's World Cup qualification |
| 11. | 26 October 2013 | City Stadium, Molodechno, Belarus | Belarus | 1–2 | 1–3 | 2015 FIFA Women's World Cup qualification |
| 12. | 28 November 2013 | Buca Arena, İzmir, Turkey | Turkey | 1–3 | 1–3 | 2015 FIFA Women's World Cup qualification |
