= Arna Ásgrímsdóttir =

Icelandic footballer (born 1992)

Personal information
- Full name: Arna Sif Ásgrímsdóttir
- Date of birth: 12 August 1992 (age 34)
- Place of birth: Akureyri, Iceland
- Positions: Centre-back; midfielder

Senior career*
Years	Team	Apps	(Gls)
2007–2015	Þór/KA	135	(25)
2015	Kopparbergs/Göteborg FC	19	(0)
2016–2017	Valur	30	(5)
2017	AGSM Verona	5	(0)
2018–2021	Þór/KA	62	(10)
2022-2025	Valur	45	(6)

International career^{‡}
2014–2023	Iceland	19	(1)
- * Club domestic league appearances and goals as of 17 November 2025 ‡ National team caps and goals as of 17 November 2025

Arna Sif Ásgrímsdóttir (born 12 August 1992) is an Icelandic footballer who plays as a defender. She had previously played for Valur in Iceland and Kopparbergs/Göteborg FC in Sweden.

== Club career ==
In 2011 Arna Sif became captain of Þór/KA and switched from playing in midfield to central defence. After guiding the club to their first ever Úrvalsdeild title in 2012, she was named Akureyri's Athlete of the Year. Arna Sif joined Swedish Damallsvenskan club Kopparbergs/Göteborg FC in February 2015, after impressing in a short trial period. At the age of 22 she had played for Þór/KA for the previous eight seasons.

In November 2015, she returned to play in the Úrvalsdeild when she signed a contract with Valur.

== International career ==
Arna Sif made her senior debut for the Iceland national team in August 2014, playing in a World Cup qualifying match lost to Denmark by 1–0 at Laugardalsvöllur in Reykjavík.

== Honours ==
Þór Akureyri

Winner

- Úrvalsdeild: 2012
- Icelandic Women's Super Cup: 2013

Runners-up

- Icelandic Women's Cup: 2013
