= 2015 FIFA Women's World Cup qualification – UEFA play-offs =

The 2015 FIFA Women's World Cup qualification UEFA play-offs decided the eighth and final UEFA qualifier for the 2015 FIFA Women's World Cup.

== Format ==
After conclusion of the group stage the four runners-up with the best record against the sides first, third, fourth and fifth in their groups played home and away matches, to determine the last participant in the FIFA World Cup.

For each play-off tie, the team that scored more goals on aggregate over the two legs qualified for the final tournament. If the aggregate score was level, the away goals rule applied, i.e., the team that scored more goals away from home over the two legs advanced. If away goals were also equal, then thirty minutes of extra time would be played, divided into two fifteen-minutes halves. The away goals rule was again applied after extra time, i.e., if there are goals scored during extra time and the aggregate score was still level, the visiting team advanced by virtue of more away goals scored. If no goals were scored during extra time, the tie would be decided by penalty shoot-out.

== Ranking of second-placed teams ==
Matches against the sixth-placed team in each group are not included in this ranking. As a result, eight matches played by each team counted for the purposes of the second-placed table.

The ranking of the runners-up is determined by the following parameters in this order:

1. Highest number of points
2. Goal difference
3. Highest number of goals scored
4. Highest number of away goals scored
5. Position in the UEFA national team coefficient ranking system;

Pos	Grp	Team	Pld	W	D	L	GF	GA	GD	Pts	Qualification
1	5	Netherlands	8	6	1	1	29	5	+24	19	Play-offs
2	2	Italy	8	6	1	1	22	5	+17	19	Play-offs
3	4	Scotland	8	6	0	2	21	6	+15	18	Play-offs
4	6	Ukraine	8	5	1	2	23	8	+15	16	Play-offs
5	1	Russia	8	5	1	2	14	17	−3	16	
6	7	Austria	8	5	0	3	21	13	+8	15	
7	3	Iceland	8	4	1	3	16	9	+7	13	

Source: UEFA
Rules for classification: 1) Points; 2) Goal difference; 3) Goals scored; 4) Away goals scored; 5) National team coefficient.

== Draw ==
The draw was held on 23 September 2014 at 14:00 local time at Nyon, Switzerland.

=== Seeding ===
In the play-off draw, teams were seeded according to their UEFA Women's National Team Coefficient Ranking (shown in brackets).

Seeded	Unseeded
Italy (6); Netherlands (8)	Scotland (12); Ukraine (15)

== Bracket ==
Semifinals
Scotland	1	0	1
Netherlands	2	2	4
Italy	2	2	4
Ukraine	1	2	3

Final
Netherlands	1	2	3
Italy	1	1	2

All times are CEST (UTC+02:00) during summer and CET (UTC+01:00) during winter.

=== Semifinals ===
Team 1	Agg.	Team 2	1st leg	2nd leg
Scotland	1–4	Netherlands	1–2	0–2
Italy	4–3	Ukraine	2–1	2–2

25 October 2014
18:30

Scotland	1–2	Netherlands
Little 49' (pen.)	Report	Martens 10'; Melis 23' (pen.)

Tynecastle Stadium, Edinburgh
Attendance: 2,098
Referee: Kateryna Monzul (Ukraine)
30 October 2014
19:00

Netherlands	2–0	Scotland
Martens 51'; Melis 77'	Report

Sparta Stadion, Rotterdam
Attendance: 7,600
Referee: Esther Staubli (Switzerland)

Netherlands won 4–1 on aggregate and advanced to final.

25 October 2014
15:00

Italy	2–1	Ukraine
Cernoia 1'; Gabbiadini 45+1'	Report	Apanaschenko 34'

Stadio Centro d'Italia, Rieti
Attendance: 5,000
Referee: Jana Adámková (Czech Republic)
29 October 2014
17:00

Ukraine	2–2	Italy
Dyatel 26', 47'	Report	Gabbiadini 55'; Panico 79'

Arena Lviv, Lviv
Attendance: 1,936
Referee: Efthalia Mitsi (Greece)

Italy won 4–3 on aggregate and advanced to final.

=== Final ===
Team 1	Agg.	Team 2	1st leg	2nd leg
Netherlands	3–2	Italy	1–1	2–1

22 November 2014
18:30

Netherlands	1–1	Italy
Miedema 54'	Report	Gabbiadini 19'

Kyocera Stadion, The Hague
Attendance: 13,109
Referee: Teodora Albon (Romania)
27 November 2014
20:30

Italy	1–2	Netherlands
Van der Gragt 53' (o.g.)	Report	Miedema 9', 43'

Stadio Marc'Antonio Bentegodi, Verona
Attendance: 6,005
Referee: Bibiana Steinhaus (Germany)

Netherlands won 3–2 on aggregate and qualified for 2015 FIFA Women's World Cup.

== Goalscorers ==
3 goals

- (Italy) Melania Gabbiadini
- (Netherlands) Vivianne Miedema

2 goals

- (Netherlands) Lieke Martens
- (Netherlands) Manon Melis
- (Ukraine) Vira Dyatel

1 goal

- (Italy) Valentina Cernoia
- (Italy) Patrizia Panico
- (Scotland) Kim Little
- (Ukraine) Daryna Apanaschenko

Own goal

- (Netherlands) Stefanie van der Gragt (playing against Italy)
