= 2014 CONCACAF Women's Championship =

CONCACAF Women's Championship USA 2014

Tournament details
- Host country: United States
- Dates: October 15–26
- Teams: 8 (from 1 confederation)
- Venues: 4 (in 4 host cities)

Final positions
- Champions: United States (7th title)
- Runners-up: Costa Rica
- Third place: Mexico
- Fourth place: Trinidad and Tobago

Tournament statistics
- Matches played: 16
- Goals scored: 65 (4.06 per match)
- Top scorer(s): (United States) Abby Wambach (7 goals)
- Best player: (United States) Carli Lloyd
- Best goalkeeper: (United States) Hope Solo
- Fair play award: Costa Rica

The 2014 CONCACAF Women's Championship, the ninth edition of the CONCACAF Women's Championship/Gold Cup/Women's World Cup qualifying tournament, was a women's soccer tournament that took place in the United States between October 15 and 26, 2014. It served as CONCACAF's qualifier to the 2015 FIFA Women's World Cup. The top three teams qualified directly. The fourth placed team advanced to a play-off against the third placed team of the 2014 Copa América Femenina.

The qualifying to the tournament was organized by the Central American Football Union (UNCAF) in Central America and the Caribbean Football Union (CFU) in the Caribbean and started on May 19, 2014.

The United States and Mexico received byes into the tournament. A total of 30 teams entered qualifying, with Martinique and Guadeloupe not eligible for World Cup qualification as they are only members of CONCACAF and not FIFA. Therefore, a total of 28 teams were in contention for the three direct places plus the play-off place against CONMEBOL's Ecuador. Canada did not participate as they already qualified to the World Cup as hosts.

The United States defeated Costa Rica 6–0 in the final to win their seventh title.

== Qualifying ==
=== North America ===
North American Football Union members Mexico and the United States gained direct entry to the final tournament. Canada did not participate as they already qualified to the World Cup as hosts.

- Mexico (2010 Runner-up)
- United States (Host, 2010 Third place)

=== Central America ===
The qualification was played between May 19 and 25.

- Guatemala (Group 1 winner)
- Costa Rica (Group 2 winner)

=== Caribbean ===
The inaugural Women's Caribbean Cup served as the qualifying event. Four nations advanced to the CONCACAF finals. Qualifying to the Women's Caribbean Cup took place from May 23 to June 22. The finals were played in August 2014. The group stage draw was published in April 2014.

- Haiti (Group A runner-up)
- Jamaica (Group A winner)
- Martinique (Group B runner-up)
- Trinidad and Tobago (Group B winner)

== Final tournament ==
Eight teams were divided in two groups and play a round-robin tournament. The top two placed teams advanced to the semifinals. The losers of those semifinals played in the third place match, while the winners faced off in the final. The top three placed teams qualified directly to the 2015 FIFA Women's World Cup.

However, as Martinique is not a member of FIFA – since it is an overseas department of the French Republic – it is therefore not eligible to qualify. It was announced during the Final Draw on September 5 that Martinique would not be able to advance beyond the group round, and that the next best team would take their place in the semifinals should they finish in the top two in their group.

== Venues ==
The tournament was played in four venues.

Washington, D.C.	Bridgeview, Illinois	Kansas City, Kansas
RFK Stadium	Toyota Park	Sporting Park
Capacity: 45,596	Capacity: 20,000	Capacity: 18,467
2014 CONCACAF Women's Championship is located in the United States		Chester, Pennsylvania
2014 CONCACAF Women's Championship is located in the United States		PPL Park
2014 CONCACAF Women's Championship is located in the United States		Capacity: 18,500

- RFK Stadium, Toyota Park and Sporting Park hosted group stage matches, while PPL Park hosted the semifinals, the third-place match and the final.

== Group stage ==
The teams are ranked according to points (3 points for a win, 1 point for a tie, 0 points for a loss). If tied on points, tiebreakers are applied in the following order:

1. Greater number of points in matches between the tied teams.
2. Greater goal difference in matches between the tied teams (if more than two teams finish equal on points).
3. Greater number of goals scored in matches among the tied teams (if more than two teams finish equal on points).
4. Greater goal difference in all group matches.
5. Greater number of goals scored in all group matches.
6. Drawing of lots.

=== Group A ===
Pos	Team	Pld	W	D	L	GF	GA	GD	Pts	Qualification
1	United States (H)	3	3	0	0	12	0	+12	9	Knockout stage
2	Trinidad and Tobago	3	2	0	1	3	2	+1	6	Knockout stage
3	Haiti	3	1	0	2	1	7	−6	3	
4	Guatemala	3	0	0	3	1	8	−7	0	

Source: CONCACAF
(H) Hosts
October 15, 2014
17:00 CDT

Guatemala	0–1	Haiti
	Report	Zullo 69'

Sporting Park, Kansas City, Kansas
Referee: Quetzalli Alvarado (Mexico)
October 15, 2014
19:30 CDT

United States	1–0	Trinidad and Tobago
Wambach 55'	Report

Sporting Park, Kansas City, Kansas
Referee: Marianela Araya (Costa Rica)

October 17, 2014
17:30 CDT

Haiti	0–1	Trinidad and Tobago
	Report	Cordner 37'

Toyota Park, Bridgeview, Illinois
Referee: Sheena Dickson (Canada)
October 17, 2014
20:00 CDT

United States	5–0	Guatemala
Heath 7', 57'; Lloyd 46'; Engen 58'; Rapinoe 66'	Report

Toyota Park, Bridgeview, Illinois
Referee: Maurees Skeete (Guyana)

October 20, 2014
17:00 EDT

Trinidad and Tobago	2–1	Guatemala
Cordner 74'; Johnson 83' (pen.)	Report	M. Monterroso 90'

RFK Stadium, Washington, D.C.
Referee: Lucila Venegas (Mexico)
October 20, 2014
19:30 EDT

Haiti	0–6	United States
	Report	Lloyd 15'; Wambach 39', 61'; Klingenberg 57'; Press 65'; Brian 82'

RFK Stadium, Washington, D.C.
Referee: Quetzalli Alvarado (Mexico)

=== Group B ===
Pos	Team	Pld	W	D	L	GF	GA	GD	Pts	Qualification
1	Costa Rica	3	3	0	0	9	2	+7	9	Knockout stage
2	Mexico	3	2	0	1	13	2	+11	6	Knockout stage
3	Jamaica	3	1	0	2	8	5	+3	3	
4	Martinique (Note: Martinique was not able to qualify past the group stage. The next best team in the group would have taken their place if they had finished the group stage in a qualifying position.)	3	0	0	3	1	22	−21	0	

Source: CONCACAF
Notes:
October 16, 2014
17:00 CDT

Jamaica	6–0	Martinique
Murray 2', 74'; Duncan 6'; Henry 22', 77'; Allen 71'	Report

Sporting Park, Kansas City, Kansas
Referee: Melissa Borjas (Honduras)
October 16, 2014
19:30 CDT

Costa Rica	1–0	Mexico
Venegas 8'	Report

Sporting Park, Kansas City, Kansas
Referee: Carol-Anne Chenard (Canada)

October 18, 2014
15:00 CDT

Costa Rica	2–1	Jamaica
Cruz Traña 76'; Cedeño 86'	Report	Duncan 77'

Toyota Park, Bridgeview, Illinois
Referee: Margaret Domka (United States)
October 18, 2014
17:30 CDT

Martinique	0–10	Mexico
	Report	Samarzich 6'; Duarte 28', 49'; Mayor 34'; Guillou 36' (o.g.); Garciamendez 40'; Garza 58'; Ocampo 75', 87'; Noyola 90+2'

Toyota Park, Bridgeview, Illinois
Referee: Tatiana Guzman (Nicaragua)

October 21, 2014
17:00 EDT

Martinique	1–6	Costa Rica
Carin 62'	Report	Sanchez 7'; Venegas 25', 90'; Acosta 32'; Cedeño 81', 83'

RFK Stadium, Washington, D.C.
Referee: Carol-Anne Chenard (Canada)
October 21, 2014
19:30 EDT

Mexico	3–1	Jamaica
Mayor 29'; Corral 59', 76'	Report	Henry 14'

RFK Stadium, Washington, D.C.
Referee: Mirian Leon (El Salvador)

== Knockout stage ==
In the knockout stage, if a match is level at the end of normal playing time, extra time is played (two periods of 15 minutes each) and followed, if necessary, by penalty shoot-out to determine the winner. The top three teams qualified directly to the 2015 FIFA Women's World Cup. The fourth placed team advanced to a play-off against the third placed team of the 2014 Copa América Femenina.

=== Bracket ===
Semifinals
October 24 – Chester, PA
Costa Rica (pen.)	1 (3)
Trinidad and Tobago	1 (0)
October 24 – Chester, PA
United States	3
Mexico	0

Final
October 26 – Chester, PA
Costa Rica	0
United States	6
Third place match
October 26 – Chester, PA
Trinidad and Tobago	2
Mexico (a.e.t.)	4

=== Semifinals ===
Winners qualified for the 2015 FIFA Women's World Cup.

October 24, 2014
16:30 EDT

Costa Rica	1–1 (a.e.t.)	Trinidad and Tobago
Venegas 19'	Report	Hutchinson 73'
Penalties
Alvarado (penalty scored); Sánchez (penalty scored); Acosta (penalty scored)	3–0	(penalty missed) Johnson; (penalty missed) Hutchinson; (penalty missed) Shade

PPL Park, Chester, Pennsylvania
Referee: Melissa Borjas (Honduras)

October 24, 2014
19:30 EDT

United States	3–0	Mexico
Lloyd 6', 30' (pen.); Press 56'	Report

PPL Park, Chester, Pennsylvania
Referee: Sheena Dickson (Canada)

=== Third place match ===
Winner qualified for the 2015 FIFA Women's World Cup. Loser entered CONMEBOL–CONCACAF play-off.

October 26, 2014
15:00 EDT

Trinidad and Tobago	2–4 (a.e.t.)	Mexico
Cordner 57'; Shade 78'	Report	Mayor 24'; Ocampo 79'; Corral 104', 106'

PPL Park, Chester, Pennsylvania
Referee: Carol-Anne Chenard (Canada)

=== Final ===
October 26, 2014
18:00 EDT

Costa Rica	0–6	United States
	Report	Wambach 4', 35', 41', 71'; Lloyd 18'; Leroux 73'

PPL Park, Chester, Pennsylvania
Referee: Lucila Venegas (Mexico)

2014 CONCACAF Women's Championship winners

United States
7th title

== Awards ==
The following awards were given at the conclusion of the tournament.

Award	Player
Golden Ball	(United States) Carli Lloyd
Golden Boot	(United States) Abby Wambach
Golden Gloves	(United States) Hope Solo
Fair Play Award	Costa Rica

All-star team
Goalkeepers	Defenders	Midfielders	Forwards
(United States) Hope Solo	(Costa Rica) Diana Saenz (United States) Christie Rampone (United States) Whitney Engen (United States) Meghan Klingenberg	(Trinidad and Tobago) Kennya Cordner (United States) Carli Lloyd (Costa Rica) Shirley Cruz Traña (United States) Christen Press	(United States) Abby Wambach (Mexico) Charlyn Corral

== Goalscorers ==
7 goals

- (United States) Abby Wambach

5 goals

- (United States) Carli Lloyd

4 goals

- (Costa Rica) Carolina Venegas
- (Mexico) Charlyn Corral

3 goals

- (Costa Rica) Raquel Rodríguez
- (Jamaica) Donna-Kay Henry
- (Mexico) Stephany Mayor
- (Mexico) Mónica Ocampo
- (Trinidad and Tobago) Kennya Cordner

2 goals

- (Jamaica) Shakira Duncan
- (Jamaica) Christina Murray
- (Mexico) Luz Duarte
- (United States) Tobin Heath
- (United States) Christen Press

1 goal

- (Costa Rica) Wendy Acosta
- (Costa Rica) Shirley Cruz Traña
- (Costa Rica) Fabiola Sanchez
- (Guatemala) María Monterroso
- (Haiti) Lindsay Zullo
- (Jamaica) Alexa Allen
- (Martinique) Prisca Carin
- (Mexico) Alina Garciamendez
- (Mexico) Dinora Garza
- (Mexico) Teresa Noyola
- (Mexico) Tanya Samarzich
- (Trinidad and Tobago) Maylee Atthin-Johnson
- (Trinidad and Tobago) Lauryn Hutchinson
- (Trinidad and Tobago) Mariah Shade
- (United States) Morgan Brian
- (United States) Whitney Engen
- (United States) Meghan Klingenberg
- (United States) Sydney Leroux
- (United States) Megan Rapinoe

1 own goal

- (Martinique) Johanne Guillou (playing against Mexico)
