= Valeria Aleshicheva =

Ukrainian football midfielder (born 1990)

Personal information
- Full name: Valeria Aleshicheva
- Date of birth: 20 August 1990 (age 36)
- Place of birth: Soviet Union
- Position: Midfielder

Team information
- Current team: Ryazan
- Number: 9

Senior career*
Years	Team	Apps	(Gls)
2009	Energiya	10	(0)
2011–	Ryazan	103	(7)

International career^{‡}
2011–	Ukraine	6	(1)
- * Club domestic league appearances and goals as of 21:13, 3 April 2015 (UTC) ‡ National team caps and goals as of 21:13, 3 April 2015 (UTC)

Valeria Aleshicheva (born 20 August 1990) is a Ukrainian football midfielder, currently playing for Ryazan.

== Honours ==
Ryazan Winner

- Russian Women's Football Championship: 2013
- Russian Women's Cup: 2014
