= Julia Borisenko =

Belarusian footballer

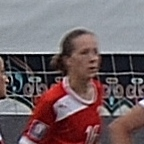

Personal information
- Full name: Julia Borisenko
- Date of birth: 4 March 1990
- Place of birth: Tallinn, then part of Estonian SSR, Soviet Union
- Date of death: 23 July 2018 (aged 28)
- Place of death: Katashy, Belarus
- Height: 1.70 m (5 ft 7 in)
- Position: Defender

Senior career*
Years	Team	Apps	(Gls)
2010–2011	Zorka-BDU Minsk	41	(10)
2011–2012	Ryazan	14	(0)
2013	Donchanka Azov	11	(0)
2013–2014	Ryazan	4	(0)
2015–2017	Minsk	52	(7)
2018	Zorka-BDU Minsk	12	(6)

International career
2009–2015	Belarus	27	(1)
- * Club domestic league appearances and goals

Julia Borisenko (4 March 1990 – 23 July 2018) was a Belarusian women's association football defender.

== Death ==
Borisenko died on 23 July 2018. Initial reports say that she drowned.

== Honours ==
Zorka-BDU

Winner

- Belarusian Women's Cup: 2010
- Belarusian Women's Super Cup: 2010

Ryazan

Winner

- Russian Women's Football Championship: 2013
- Russian Women's Cup: 2014
