= Biljana Bradić =

Serbian footballer (born 1991)

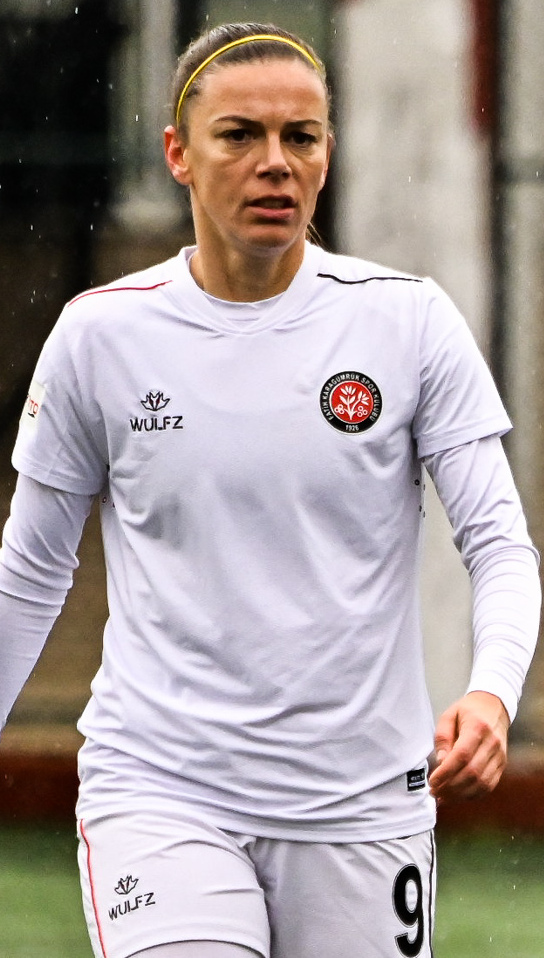
- Biljana Bradić (2023)

Personal information
- Full name: Biljana Bradić
- Date of birth: 24 April 1991 (age 35)
- Place of birth: Kuršumlija, SFR Yugoslavia
- Position: Forward

Team information
- Current team: Panathinaikos

Senior career*
Years	Team	Apps	(Gls)
2007–2008	Mašinac Niš		
2008–2014	Kolibri Kuršumlija		
2014–2016	Pomurje	20	(40)
2016	Târgu Mureș		
2017	Pomurje	9	(12)
2017–2018	Aris Thessalonikis	22	(13)
2018–2022	Diósgyőri VTK	65	(48)
2022–2023	Ferencváros		
2023–2024	Fatih Karagümrük	26	(9)
2024–2025	Granada	4	(0)
2025–	Panathinaikos	24	(7)

International career^{‡}
2013–	Serbia	18	(2)
- * Club domestic league appearances and goals as of 4 June 2026 ‡ National team caps and goals as of 7 April 2022

Biljana Bradić (born 24 April 1991) is a Serbian football forward that plays for Greek club Panathinaikos.
