= Tetyana Romanenko =

Ukrainian footballer (born 1990)

Tetiana Romanenko
Personal information
- Full name: Tetyana Oleksandrivna Romanenko
- Date of birth: 3 October 1990 (age 36)
- Place of birth: Odesa, Ukraine SSR, Soviet Union (now Ukraine)
- Position: Striker

Team information
- Current team: Saint-Étienne

Senior career*
| Years | Team | Apps | (Gls) |
| 2008 | Zhytlobud-1 | | |
| 2009 | Energiya | 6 | (1) |
| 2010–2014 | Kubanochka | 88 | (22) |
| 2014–2015 | Suwon UDC | | |
| 2015–2016 | Empoli | | |
| 2017–2022 | Reims | 95 | (26) |
| 2022– | Saint-Étienne | 16 | (1) |

International career
| 2009– | Ukraine | 65 | (9) |
- * Club domestic league appearances and goals

Tetyana Romanenko (Ukrainian: Тетяна Олександрівна Романенко) is a Ukrainian football striker, currently playing for Saint-Étienne in the Division 2 Féminine. She has also played for Zhytlobud-1 Kharkiv and Energiya Voronezh.

She is a member of the Ukrainian national team, and took part in the 2009 European Championship.

== Honours ==
- French Championship D2 : Winner 2019
