= Ivana Krivokapić =

Montenegrin footballer

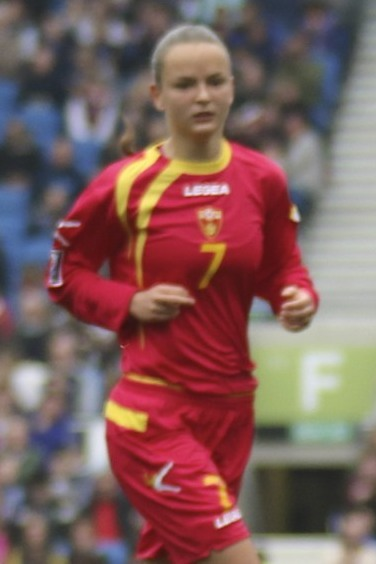

Personal information
- Full name: Ivana Krivokapić
- Date of birth: 15 June 1995 (age 31)
- Place of birth: Montenegro, FR Yugoslavia
- Position: Forward

Team information
- Current team: ŽFK Ekonomist
- Number: 7

Senior career*
Years	Team	Apps	(Gls)
2012–	ŽFK Ekonomist		

International career^{‡}
2013	Montenegro U19	3	(1)
2013–	Montenegro	18	(2)
- * Club domestic league appearances and goals as of 20:26, 3 April 2015 (UTC) ‡ National team caps and goals as of 20:26, 3 April 2015 (UTC)

Ivana Krivokapić (born 15 June 1995) is a Montenegrin football forward currently playing for ŽFK Ekonomist.
