= Oksana Yakovyshyn =

Ukrainian footballer

Personal information
- Full name: Oksana Yakovyshyn
- Date of birth: 20 March 1993 (age 33)
- Place of birth: Ukraine
- Position: Striker

Senior career*
Years	Team	Apps	(Gls)
2008	Lehenda Chernihiv	23	(23)
2011	WFC Rossiyanka	6	(0)
2011–	Mordovochka	5	(0)

International career
2009–	Ukraine		
- * Club domestic league appearances and goals

Oksana Yakovyshyn is a Ukrainian football striker, currently playing for Mordovochka Saransk in the Russian Championship. She previously played for Lehenda Chernihiv and Rossiyanka.

She is a member of the Ukrainian national team. She made her debut in the 2009 European Championship, where she replaced injured Svitlana Vanyushkina.
