= Indira Ilić =

Serbian footballer (born 1986)

Personal information
- Full name: Indira Ilić
- Date of birth: 17 November 1986 (age 39)
- Place of birth: Jagodina, SFR Yugoslavia
- Height: 1.70 m (5 ft 7 in)
- Position: Defender

Team information
- Current team: Assi IF

Youth career
- 2012: Iowa Western Community College

Senior career*
Years	Team	Apps	(Gls)
2003–2014	Mašinac Niš	257	(15)
2010–2011	Keflavik FC	37	(9)
2011	Crvena Zvezda	12	(14)
2013	Emerald City FC	13	(0)
2014–	Assi IF		

International career
2005–	Serbia	24	
- * Club domestic league appearances and goals

Indira Ilić (Serbian Cyrillic: Индира Илић; born 17 November 1986) is a Serbian association football defender, currently playing for Swedish club Assi IF. She previously played for Mašinac Niš, Crvena Zvezda, and Emerald City FC.

== Early life ==
Ilić attended college at Iowa Western Community College in Council Bluffs. She was the captain and second leading scorer on the team with 18 goals and 13 assists. She won several awards including Defensive Most Valuable Player, the Vanguard Award, and was named to the All-region XI First Team, NJCAA All-American First Team and NJCAA National All-Tournament Team.

== Playing career ==
=== International ===
Ilić is a member of the Serbian national team.
