= Ellvana Curo =

Kosovan–Albanian footballer

Personal information
- Date of birth: 22 January 1992 (age 34)
- Place of birth: Kosovo
- Height: 1.82 m (6 ft 0 in)
- Positions: Forward; midfielder

Team information
- Current team: Box Hill United
- Number: 11

Youth career
- 2003: Altona City SC
- 2004–2006: South Melbourne WFC
- 2007: Keilor Park WSC

Senior career*
Years	Team	Apps	(Gls)
2007–2009	Preston Lions	26	(11)
2009	Heidelberg United WFC	5	(2)
2010	Ashburton WSC	15	(8)
2011	Altona City WSC	16	(11)
2012	South Melbourne WFC	13	(9)
2013	Box Hill United	3	(2)
2014	Bundoora United		
2015	Bundoora United		

International career
2011–	Albania	9	(1)
- * Club domestic league appearances and goals

Ellvana Curo (born 22 January 1992), nicknamed "Elly", is a Kosovan–born Albanian footballer who plays as a forward or midfielder for Bundoora United in the Victorian Women's Premier League and the Albania women's national team. A tall and strong target striker, she rarely gets pushed off the ball.

Curo is of Albanian descent and her father was from Montenegro and a professional footballer in Australia. In her youth Curo was involved in sports and played for several women's football teams in Melbourne. Later she played at Box Hill United being awarded several trophies and winning 5 cups with the football club.

== See also ==
- List of Albania women's international footballers

== See also ==
- OzFootball's Victorian League Archive
