= Danka Podovac =

Serbian footballer (born 1982)

Personal information
- Full name: Danka Podovac
- Date of birth: 2 July 1982 (age 44)
- Place of birth: SFR Yugoslavia
- Position: Midfielder

Team information
- Current team: Assistant Coach, Serbia Women's National team

Senior career*
Years	Team	Apps	(Gls)
	Masinac Nis	83	(83)
2006–2008	Keflavík	44	(17)
2009	Fylkir	17	(13)
2010	Þór/KA	13	(9)
2011–2012	ÍBV	36	(25)
2013–2014	Stjarnan	24	(16)
2015	Östersunds	3	(1)
2015–	Pomurje		

International career
- Serbia
- * Club domestic league appearances and goals

Danka Podovac (Serbian Cyrillic: Данка Подовац; born 2 July 1982) is a Serbian-Icelandic football midfielder currently playing for ZNK Pomurje.

She began her career in Serbian powerhouse Masinac Nis, with whom she also played the European Cup and later moved to Iceland's Úrvalsdeild in 2006, playing three seasons for Keflavík and one for Fylkir and Þór/KA before signing for ÍBV in 2011. She is a member of the Serbian national team. She signed for Stjarnan in 2013. In 2014, she received an Icelandic citizenship.

After nearly a decade in Iceland, in 2015 she moved to Östersunds DFF in the Swedish 2nd tier before signing that same year for Slovenian champion ZNK Pomurje.
