= Vesna Smiljković =

Serbian footballer (born 1983)

Personal information
- Full name: Vesna Elísa Smiljković
- Date of birth: 31 January 1983 (age 43)
- Place of birth: SFR Yugoslavia
- Position: Midfielder

Team information
- Current team: Fylkir

Senior career*
Years	Team	Apps	(Gls)
?–2005	Masinac Nis		
2005–2008	Keflavík	58	(22)
2009–2010	Þór/KA	35	(17)
2011–2015	ÍBV	68	(27)
2015–2019	Valur	53	(18)
2020–present	Fylkir	0	(0)

International career
2002–	Serbia	19	(5)
- * Club domestic league appearances and goals

Vesna Elísa Smiljković (Serbian Cyrillic: Весна Елиса Смиљковић; born 31 January 1983) is a Serbian-Icelandic football midfielder currently playing in Iceland's Úrvalsdeild kvenna for Fylkir. She began her career in Serbian powerhouse Masinac Nis, with which she played the European Cup, before moving to Iceland where she has also played for Keflavik IF and Þór/KA. In 2014, she received an Icelandic citizenship.

She has been a member of the Serbian national team for a decade. One of her major highlights was scoring a goal in overtime versus England in September 2011 to attain a surprise draw against the Euro 2009 runner-up.

In February 2018, it was reported that she was pregnant and would miss most of the upcoming season.

In May 2020, she signed with Fylkir.
