= 2017 Algarve Cup squads =

Lists of the squads for the 2017 Algarve Cup

This article lists the squads for the 2017 Algarve Cup, the 24th edition of the Algarve Cup. The cup consisted of a series of friendly games, and was held in the Algarve region of Portugal from 1 to 8 March 2017. The twelve national teams involved in the tournament registered a squad of 23 players.

The age listed for each player is as of 1 March 2017, the first day of the tournament. The numbers of caps and goals listed for each player do not include any matches played after the start of tournament. The club listed is the club for which the player last played a competitive match prior to the tournament. The nationality for each club reflects the national association (not the league) to which the club is affiliated. A flag is included for coaches that are of a different nationality than their own national team.

== Group A ==
=== Canada ===
Head coach: (England) John Herdman

The squad was announced on 21 February 2017.

No.	Pos.	Player	Date of birth (age)	Caps	Goals	Club
1	GK	Stephanie Labbé	October 10, 1986 (aged 30)	38	0	(United States Soccer Federation) Washington Spirit
2	DF	Allysha Chapman	January 25, 1989 (aged 28)	40	1	(United States Soccer Federation) Houston Dash
3	DF	Kadeisha Buchanan	November 5, 1995 (aged 21)	63	3	(French Football Federation) Lyon
4	DF	Shelina Zadorsky	August 24, 1992 (aged 24)	23	1	(United States Soccer Federation) Washington Spirit
5	DF	Quinn (Note: Then known as Rebecca Quinn)	August 11, 1995 (aged 21)	25	3	(United States Soccer Federation) Duke Blue Devils
6	MF	Deanne Rose	March 3, 1999 (aged 17)	20	5	(Canadian Soccer Association) Scarborough GS United
10	DF	Ashley Lawrence	June 11, 1995 (aged 21)	46	4	(French Football Federation) Paris Saint-Germain
11	MF	Desiree Scott	July 31, 1987 (aged 29)	118	0	(United States Soccer Federation) Kansas City
12	FW	Christine Sinclair (captain)	June 12, 1983 (aged 33)	251	165	(United States Soccer Federation) Portland Thorns
13	MF	Sophie Schmidt	June 28, 1988 (aged 28)	157	17	(German Football Association) 1. FFC Frankfurt
15	FW	Nichelle Prince	February 19, 1995 (aged 22)	22	6	(United States Soccer Federation) Houston Dash
16	FW	Janine Beckie	August 20, 1994 (aged 22)	26	14	(United States Soccer Federation) Houston Dash
17	MF	Jessie Fleming	March 11, 1998 (aged 18)	37	3	(United States Soccer Federation) UCLA Bruins
18	GK	Sabrina D'Angelo	May 11, 1993 (aged 23)	4	0	(United States Soccer Federation) North Carolina Courage
19	FW	Gabrielle Carle	October 12, 1998 (aged 18)	7	1	(Canadian Soccer Association) Lévis-Est
21	GK	Kailen Sheridan	July 16, 1995 (aged 21)	1	0	(United States Soccer Federation) Sky Blue
22	DF	Lindsay Agnew	March 31, 1995 (aged 21)	0	0	(United States Soccer Federation) Ohio State Buckeyes
23	FW	Jordyn Huitema	May 8, 2001 (aged 15)	0	0	(Canadian Soccer Association) Vancouver Whitecaps
24	DF	Hannah Taylor	June 7, 1999 (aged 17)	0	0	(United States Soccer Federation) Eastside G98
25	MF	Sarah Stratigakis	March 7, 1999 (aged 17)	1	0	(Canadian Soccer Association) Aurora United
26	FW	Marie Levasseur	May 18, 1997 (aged 19)	2	0	(United States Soccer Federation) Memphis Tigers
27	FW	Alex Lamontagne	July 27, 1996 (aged 20)	0	0	(Canadian Soccer Association) Durham United

=== Denmark ===
Head coach: Nils Nielsen

The squad was announced on 3 February 2017.

No.	Pos.	Player	Date of birth (age)	Caps	Goals	Club
1	GK	Stina Lykke Petersen	9 February 1986 (aged 31)	60	0	(Danish Football Association) KoldingQ
2	DF	Line Røddik Hansen	31 January 1988 (aged 29)	120	13	(Royal Spanish Football Federation) Barcelona
3	DF	Janni Arnth Jensen	15 October 1986 (aged 30)	68	1	(Swedish Football Association) Linköping
4	DF	Maja Kildemoes	15 August 1996 (aged 20)	12	1	(Swedish Football Association) Linköping
5	DF	Simone Boye Sørensen	3 March 1992 (aged 24)	35	4	(Danish Football Association) Brøndby
7	MF	Sanne Troelsgaard	15 August 1988 (aged 28)	104	34	(Danish Football Association) KoldingQ
8	DF	Theresa Nielsen	20 July 1986 (aged 30)	104	3	(Norwegian Football Federation) Vålerenga
10	FW	Pernille Harder (captain)	15 November 1992 (aged 24)	80	40	(German Football Association) VfL Wolfsburg
11	MF	Katrine Veje	19 June 1991 (aged 25)	89	6	(Danish Football Association) Brøndby
12	FW	Stine Larsen	24 January 1996 (aged 21)	16	2	(Danish Football Association) Brøndby
14	MF	Sara Thrige	15 May 1996 (aged 20)	3	0	(Danish Football Association) KoldingQ
15	MF	Frederikke Thøgersen	24 July 1995 (aged 21)	21	0	(Danish Football Association) Fortuna Hjørring
16	GK	Line Geltzer Johansen	26 July 1989 (aged 27)	2	0	(Danish Football Association) Vejle Boldklub
17	MF	Line Sigvardsen Jensen	23 August 1991 (aged 25)	54	1	(United States Soccer Federation) Washington Spirit
18	DF	Mie Leth Jans	6 February 1994 (aged 23)	15	0	(Danish Football Association) Brøndby
19	DF	Cecilie Sandvej	13 June 1990 (aged 26)	21	1	(German Football Association) SC Sand
20	MF	Nanna Christiansen	17 June 1989 (aged 27)	72	6	(Danish Football Association) Brøndby
21	FW	Sarah Dyrehauge Hansen	14 September 1996 (aged 20)	9	2	(Danish Football Association) Fortuna Hjørring
22	GK	Naja Bahrenscheer	3 September 1996 (aged 20)	1	0	(Danish Football Association) BSF
23	FW	Lise Overgaard Munk	26 May 1989 (aged 27)	37	5	(German Football Association) 1. FFC Frankfurt
24	FW	Nicoline Sørensen	15 August 1997 (aged 19)	2	0	(Danish Football Association) Brøndby
25	DF	Luna Gevitz	3 March 1994 (aged 22)	7	0	(Danish Football Association) Fortuna Hjørring

=== Portugal ===
Head coach: Francisco Neto

The squad was announced on 20 February 2017.

No.	Pos.	Player	Date of birth (age)	Caps	Goals	Club
1	GK	Neide Simões	19 July 1988 (aged 28)	59	0	(Portuguese Football Federation) Valadares Gaia
2	DF	Mónica Mendes	16 June 1993 (aged 23)	34	1	(Swiss Football Association) Neunkirch
3	DF	Raquel Infante	19 September 1990 (aged 26)	11	0	(Royal Spanish Football Federation) Levante
4	DF	Sílvia Rebelo	20 May 1989 (aged 27)	66	1	(Portuguese Football Federation) Braga
5	DF	Matilde Fidalgo	15 May 1994 (aged 22)	28	0	(Portuguese Football Federation) CF Benfica
6	DF	Filipa Rodrigues	4 September 1993 (aged 23)	13	3	(Portuguese Football Federation) Estoril
7	MF	Cláudia Neto (captain)	18 April 1988 (aged 28)	99	13	(Swedish Football Association) Linköping
8	FW	Laura Luís	15 August 1992 (aged 24)	32	7	(German Football Association) FF USV Jena
9	MF	Ana Borges	15 June 1990 (aged 26)	87	9	(Portuguese Football Federation) Sporting CP
10	FW	Ana Leite	23 October 1991 (aged 25)	35	0	(German Football Association) Bayer Leverkusen
11	MF	Tatiana Pinto	28 March 1994 (aged 22)	19	1	(Portuguese Football Federation) Sporting CP
12	GK	Patrícia Morais	17 June 1992 (aged 24)	39	0	(Portuguese Football Federation) Sporting CP
13	MF	Fátima Pinto	16 January 1996 (aged 21)	22	0	(Portuguese Football Federation) Sporting CP
14	MF	Dolores Silva	7 August 1991 (aged 25)	73	9	(German Football Association) FF USV Jena
15	DF	Carole Costa	3 May 1990 (aged 26)	76	6	(German Football Association) BV Cloppenburg
16	FW	Diana Silva	4 June 1995 (aged 21)	17	1	(Portuguese Football Federation) Sporting CP
17	MF	Vanessa Marques^{INJ}	12 April 1996 (aged 20)	34	2	(Portuguese Football Federation) Braga
17	FW	Jéssica Silva	11 December 1994 (aged 22)	36	6	(Portuguese Football Federation) Braga
18	FW	Carolina Mendes	27 November 1987 (aged 29)	54	9	(Football Association of Iceland) Grindavík
19	MF	Amanda DaCosta	7 October 1989 (aged 27)	14	0	(United States Soccer Federation) Chicago Red Stars
20	MF	Suzane Pires	17 August 1992 (aged 24)	17	0	(Brazilian Football Confederation) Santos
21	MF	Diana Gomes	26 July 1998 (aged 18)	0	0	(Portuguese Football Federation) Valadares Gaia
22	GK	Rute Costa	1 June 1994 (aged 22)	1	0	(Portuguese Football Federation) Braga
23	MF	Mélissa Antunes	8 January 1990 (aged 27)	21	1	(Portuguese Football Federation) Braga

Following an injury in the first match against Russia, the Portuguese team was authorized to replace midfielder Vanessa Marques. Jéssica Silva joined the team.

=== Russia ===
Head coach: Elena Fomina

No.	Pos.	Player	Date of birth (age)	Caps	Goals	Club
1	GK	Tatyana Shcherbak	22 October 1997 (aged 19)	0	0	(Russian Football Union) Kubanochka Krasnodar
2	FW	Nelli Korovkina	1 November 1989 (aged 27)	27	6	(Russian Football Union) Kubanochka Krasnodar
3	DF	Anna Kozhnikova	10 July 1987 (aged 29)	61	5	(Russian Football Union) CSKA Moscow
4	DF	Tatiana Sheikina	7 March 1992 (aged 24)			(Russian Football Union) Ryazan
7	FW	Natalia Sokolova	13 June 1997 (aged 19)	0	0	(Russian Football Union) Kubanochka Krasnodar
8	DF	Daria Makarenko	7 March 1992 (aged 24)	37	2	(Russian Football Union) Ryazan
9	MF	Anna Cholovyaga	8 May 1992 (aged 24)	35	3	(Russian Football Union) CSKA Moscow
10	MF	Elena Terekhova	5 July 1987 (aged 29)	74	9	(Russian Football Union) CSKA Moscow
11	MF	Ekaterina Sochneva	12 August 1985 (aged 31)	73	19	(Russian Football Union) CSKA Moscow
12	GK	Alena Bellaeva	13 February 1992 (aged 25)	1	0	(Russian Football Union) Chertanovo Moscow
13	MF	Elena Kostareva	9 July 1992 (aged 24)			(Russian Football Union) Kubanochka Krasnodar
14	MF	Natalia Mashina	28 March 1997 (aged 19)			(Russian Football Union) CSKA Moscow
15	FW	Elena Danilova	17 June 1987 (aged 29)	25	9	(Russian Football Union) Ryazan
16	MF	Anastasia Pozdeeva	12 June 1993 (aged 23)	12	0	(Russian Football Union) Zvezda-2005 Perm
17	FW	Ekaterina Pantyukhina	9 April 1993 (aged 23)	23	8	(Russian Football Union) Zvezda-2005 Perm
18	DF	Elvira Ziyastinova	13 February 1991 (aged 26)	6	0	(Russian Football Union) CSKA Moscow
19	DF	Ekaterina Morozova	26 March 1991 (aged 25)	10	0	(Russian Football Union) Chertanovo Moscow
20	MF	Margarita Chernomyrdina	6 March 1996 (aged 20)	11	0	(Russian Football Union) Chertanovo Moscow
21	GK	Yulia Grichenko	10 March 1990 (aged 26)	8	0	(Russian Football Union) CSKA Moscow
22	DF	Kseniya Kovalenko	26 May 1995 (aged 21)	4	0	(Russian Football Union) CSKA Moscow

== Group B ==
=== Iceland ===
Head coach: Freyr Alexandersson

The squad was announced on 16 February 2017.

No.	Pos.	Player	Date of birth (age)	Caps	Goals	Club
1	GK	Guðbjörg Gunnarsdóttir	18 May 1985 (aged 31)	45	0	(Swedish Football Association) Djurgården
2	DF	Sif Atladóttir	15 July 1985 (aged 31)	56	0	(Swedish Football Association) Kristianstad
3	DF	Arna Ásgrímsdóttir	12 August 1992 (aged 24)	10	1	(Football Association of Iceland) Valur
4	DF	Glódís Perla Viggósdóttir	27 June 1995 (aged 21)	46	2	(Swedish Football Association) Eskilstuna United
5	MF	Gunnhildur Yrsa Jónsdóttir	28 September 1988 (aged 28)	34	4	(Norwegian Football Federation) Vålerenga
6	DF	Thelma Björk Einarsdóttir	11 July 1990 (aged 26)	10	0	(Football Association of Iceland) Valur
7	MF	Sara Björk Gunnarsdóttir (captain)	29 September 1990 (aged 26)	98	18	(German Football Association) VfL Wolfsburg
8	MF	Sigríður Lára Garðarsdóttir	11 March 1994 (aged 22)	15	4	(Football Association of Iceland) ÍBV
9	FW	Margrét Lára Viðarsdóttir	25 July 1986 (aged 30)	112	77	(Football Association of Iceland) Valur
10	MF	Dagný Brynjarsdóttir	10 August 1991 (aged 25)	69	19	(United States Soccer Federation) Portland Thorns
11	DF	Hallbera Guðný Gísladóttir	14 September 1986 (aged 30)	76	3	(Swedish Football Association) Djurgården
12	GK	Sandra Sigurðardóttir	2 October 1986 (aged 30)	14	0	(Football Association of Iceland) Valur
13	GK	Sonný Lára Þráinsdóttir	9 December 1986 (aged 30)	2	0	(Football Association of Iceland) Breiðablik
14	DF	Málfríður Erna Sigurðardóttir	30 May 1984 (aged 32)	28	0	(Football Association of Iceland) Breiðablik
15	FW	Elín Metta Jensen	1 March 1995 (aged 22)	21	4	(Football Association of Iceland) Valur
16	MF	Katrín Ásbjörnsdóttir	11 December 1992 (aged 24)	5	1	(Football Association of Iceland) Stjarnan
17	DF	Elísa Viðarsdóttir	26 May 1991 (aged 25)	31	0	(Football Association of Iceland) Valur
18	MF	Sandra Jessen^{INJ}	18 January 1995 (aged 22)	17	6	(Football Association of Iceland) Þór/KA
18	MF	Guðmunda Brynja Óladóttir	3 January 1994 (aged 23)	11	1	(Football Association of Iceland) Selfoss
19	DF	Anna Björk Kristjánsdóttir	14 October 1989 (aged 27)	27	0	(Swedish Football Association) LB07
20	FW	Berglind Björg Þorvaldsdóttir	18 January 1992 (aged 25)	19	0	(Football Association of Iceland) Fylkir
21	DF	Dóra María Lárusdóttir	24 July 1985 (aged 31)	113	18	(Football Association of Iceland) Valur
22	MF	Rakel Hönnudóttir	30 December 1988 (aged 28)	75	5	(Football Association of Iceland) Breiðablik
23	MF	Fanndís Friðriksdóttir	9 May 1990 (aged 26)	76	10	(Football Association of Iceland) Breiðablik

Following an injury in the first match against Norway, the Iceland team was authorized to replace midfielder Sandra Jessen. Guðmunda Brynja Óladóttir joined the team.

=== Japan ===
Head coach: Asako Takakura

The squad was announced on 9 February 2017.

No.	Pos.	Player	Date of birth (age)	Caps	Goals	Club
1	GK	Erina Yamane	20 December 1990 (aged 26)	21	0	(Japan Football Association) JEF United Chiba
2	DF	Saori Ariyoshi	1 November 1987 (aged 29)	49	1	(Japan Football Association) Nippon TV Beleza
3	DF	Aya Sameshima	16 June 1987 (aged 29)	72	4	(Japan Football Association) INAC Kobe Leonessa
4	DF	Saki Kumagai	17 October 1990 (aged 26)	81	1	(French Football Federation) Lyon
5	DF	Yuri Kawamura	17 May 1989 (aged 27)	29	2	(Japan Football Association) Albirex Niigata
6	MF	Rumi Utsugi	5 December 1988 (aged 28)	90	5	(United States Soccer Federation) Seattle Reign
7	MF	Emi Nakajima	27 September 1990 (aged 26)	31	7	(Japan Football Association) INAC Kobe Leonessa
8	FW	Sonoko Chiba	15 June 1993 (aged 23)	3	0	(Japan Football Association) AS Harima ALBION
9	FW	Yuika Sugasawa	5 October 1990 (aged 26)	39	10	(Japan Football Association) Urawa Red Diamonds
10	MF	Mizuho Sakaguchi	15 October 1987 (aged 29)	103	28	(Japan Football Association) Nippon TV Beleza
11	FW	Mana Iwabuchi	18 March 1993 (aged 23)	37	8	(German Football Association) Bayern Munich
12	GK	Ayaka Yamashita	29 September 1995 (aged 21)	6	0	(Japan Football Association) Nippon TV Beleza
13	FW	Rika Masuya	14 September 1995 (aged 21)	13	3	(Japan Football Association) INAC Kobe Leonessa
14	MF	Yu Nakasato	14 July 1994 (aged 22)	3	0	(Japan Football Association) Nippon TV Beleza
15	MF	Hikari Takagi	21 May 1993 (aged 23)	1	0	(Japan Football Association) Nojima Stella Kanagawa Sagamihara
16	FW	Mina Tanaka	28 April 1994 (aged 22)	6	1	(Japan Football Association) Nippon TV Beleza
17	MF	Yui Hasegawa (captain)	29 January 1997 (aged 20)	0	0	(Japan Football Association) Nippon TV Beleza
18	DF	Kaede Nakamura	3 August 1991 (aged 25)	0	0	(Japan Football Association) Albirex Niigata
19	FW	Mayu Sasaki	12 January 1993 (aged 24)	3	0	(Japan Football Association) Vegalta Sendai
20	DF	Kumi Yokoyama	13 August 1993 (aged 23)	13	5	(Japan Football Association) AC Nagano Parceiro
21	FW	Hikaru Kitagawa	10 May 1997 (aged 19)	0	0	(Japan Football Association) Urawa Red Diamonds
22	MF	Yuka Momiki	9 April 1996 (aged 20)	0	0	(Japan Football Association) Nippon TV Beleza
23	GK	Chika Hirao	31 December 1996 (aged 20)	0	0	(Japan Football Association) Urawa Red Diamonds

=== Norway ===
Head coach: (Sweden) Martin Sjögren

The squad was announced on 15 February 2017.

No.	Pos.	Player	Date of birth (age)	Caps	Goals	Club
1	GK	Ingrid Hjelmseth	10 April 1980 (aged 36)	108	0	(Norwegian Football Federation) Stabæk
2	DF	Ingrid Moe Wold	29 January 1990 (aged 27)	32	3	(Norwegian Football Federation) Lillestrøm
3	DF	Maria Thorisdottir	5 June 1993 (aged 23)	8	0	(Norwegian Football Federation) Klepp
4	DF	Stine Reinås	15 July 1994 (aged 22)	2	1	(Norwegian Football Federation) Stabæk
5	DF	Andrine Tomter	5 February 1995 (aged 22)	13	0	(Norwegian Football Federation) Avaldsnes
6	DF	Maren Mjelde (captain)	6 November 1989 (aged 27)	110	16	(The Football Association) Chelsea
7	MF	Guro Reiten	26 July 1994 (aged 22)	9	0	(Norwegian Football Federation) Lillestrøm
8	MF	Andrine Hegerberg	6 June 1993 (aged 23)	19	1	(The Football Association) Birmingham City
9	FW	Hege Hansen	24 October 1990 (aged 26)	12	4	(Norwegian Football Federation) Klepp
10	MF	Caroline Graham Hansen	18 February 1995 (aged 22)	41	15	(German Football Association) VfL Wolfsburg
11	DF	Nora Holstad Berge	26 March 1987 (aged 29)	64	2	(German Football Association) Bayern Munich
12	GK	Cecilie Fiskerstrand	20 March 1996 (aged 20)	11	0	(Norwegian Football Federation) Lillestrøm
13	MF	Ingrid Schjelderup	21 December 1987 (aged 29)	12	0	(Swedish Football Association) Eskilstuna United
14	FW	Ada Hegerberg	10 July 1995 (aged 21)	57	36	(French Football Federation) Lyon
16	FW	Elise Thorsnes	14 August 1988 (aged 28)	99	16	(Norwegian Football Federation) Avaldsnes
17	MF	Kristine Minde	8 August 1992 (aged 24)	70	8	(Swedish Football Association) Linköping
18	MF	Vilde Bøe Risa	13 July 1995 (aged 21)	4	1	(Norwegian Football Federation) Arna-Bjørnar
19	MF	Ingvild Isaksen	10 February 1989 (aged 28)	54	2	(Norwegian Football Federation) Stabæk
20	MF	Ingrid Marie Spord	12 July 1994 (aged 22)	0	0	(Norwegian Football Federation) Lillestrøm
21	FW	Lisa-Marie Karlseng Utland	19 September 1992 (aged 24)	14	2	(Norwegian Football Federation) Røa
22	DF	Anja Sønstevold	21 June 1992 (aged 24)	8	0	(Norwegian Football Federation) Lillestrøm
23	GK	Kristine Nøstmo	8 June 1993 (aged 23)	0	0	(Norwegian Football Federation) Trondheims-Ørn
25	FW	Synne Jensen	15 February 1996 (aged 21)	13	0	(Norwegian Football Federation) Stabæk

=== Spain ===
Head coach: Jorge Vilda

The squad was announced on 20 February 2017.

No.	Pos.	Player	Date of birth (age)	Caps	Goals	Club
1	GK	Sandra Paños	4 November 1992 (aged 24)	9	0	(Royal Spanish Football Federation) Barcelona
2	MF	Andrea Falcón	28 February 1997 (aged 20)	0	0	(Royal Spanish Football Federation) Atlético Madrid
3	DF	Leila Ouahabi	22 March 1993 (aged 23)	8	0	(Royal Spanish Football Federation) Barcelona
4	DF	Andrea Pereira	19 September 1993 (aged 23)	4	0	(Royal Spanish Football Federation) Atlético Madrid
5	DF	Ivana Andrés	13 July 1994 (aged 22)	2	0	(Royal Spanish Football Federation) Valencia
6	MF	Virginia Torrecilla	4 September 1994 (aged 22)	28	4	(French Football Federation) Montpellier
7	MF	Marta Corredera	8 August 1991 (aged 25)	39	3	(Royal Spanish Football Federation) Atlético Madrid
8	FW	Sonia Bermúdez (vice-captain)	18 November 1984 (aged 32)	59	34	(Royal Spanish Football Federation) Atlético Madrid
9	FW	Verónica Boquete (captain)	9 April 1987 (aged 29)	55	38	(French Football Federation) Paris Saint-Germain
10	FW	Jennifer Hermoso	9 May 1990 (aged 26)	38	15	(Royal Spanish Football Federation) Barcelona
11	MF	Alexia Putellas	4 February 1994 (aged 23)	36	6	(Royal Spanish Football Federation) Barcelona
12	MF	Patricia Guijarro	17 May 1998 (aged 18)	0	0	(Royal Spanish Football Federation) Barcelona
13	GK	María Asunción Quiñones	29 October 1996 (aged 20)	0	0	(Royal Spanish Football Federation) Real Sociedad
14	MF	Vicky Losada	5 March 1991 (aged 25)	37	9	(Royal Spanish Football Federation) Barcelona
15	MF	Silvia Meseguer	12 March 1989 (aged 27)	45	4	(Royal Spanish Football Federation) Atlético Madrid
16	DF	Alexandra López	26 February 1989 (aged 28)	9	0	(Royal Spanish Football Federation) Atlético Madrid
17	FW	Olga García	1 June 1992 (aged 24)	8	0	(Royal Spanish Football Federation) Barcelona
18	DF	Marta Torrejón	27 February 1990 (aged 27)	65	9	(Royal Spanish Football Federation) Barcelona
19	MF	Amanda Sampedro	26 June 1993 (aged 23)	18	6	(Royal Spanish Football Federation) Atlético Madrid
20	DF	Irene Paredes	4 July 1991 (aged 25)	37	3	(French Football Federation) Paris Saint-Germain
21	DF	María Pilar León	13 June 1995 (aged 21)	1	0	(Royal Spanish Football Federation) Atlético Madrid
22	FW	Mariona Caldentey	19 March 1996 (aged 20)	0	0	(Royal Spanish Football Federation) Barcelona
23	GK	Esther Sullastres	20 March 1993 (aged 23)	0	0	(Royal Spanish Football Federation) Valencia

== Group C ==
=== Australia ===
Head coach: Alen Stajcic

The squad was announced on 17 February 2017.

No.	Pos.	Player	Date of birth (age)	Caps	Goals	Club
1	GK	Lydia Williams	13 May 1988 (aged 28)	57	0	(Football Australia) Melbourne City
2	DF	Ellie Carpenter	28 April 2000 (aged 16)	5	0	(Football Australia) Western Sydney Wanderers
3	MF	Gema Simon	19 July 1990 (aged 26)	5	0	(Football Australia) Newcastle Jets
4	DF	Clare Polkinghorne (Co-captain)	1 February 1989 (aged 28)	92	7	(Football Australia) Brisbane Roar
5	DF	Amy Harrison	21 April 1996 (aged 20)	3	0	(Football Australia) Sydney FC
6	MF	Chloe Logarzo	22 December 1994 (aged 22)	12	0	(Football Australia) Newcastle Jets
7	DF	Steph Catley	26 January 1994 (aged 23)	53	2	(Football Australia) Melbourne City
8	MF	Elise Kellond-Knight	10 August 1990 (aged 26)	76	1	(German Football Association) Turbine Potsdam
9	MF	Caitlin Foord	11 November 1994 (aged 22)	50	8	(Football Australia) Sydney FC
10	MF	Emily van Egmond	12 July 1993 (aged 23)	57	14	(German Football Association) VfL Wolfsburg
11	FW	Lisa De Vanna (Co-captain)	14 November 1984 (aged 32)	117	40	(Football Australia) Canberra United
13	DF	Teigen Allen	12 February 1994 (aged 23)	39	0	(Football Australia) Melbourne City
14	DF	Alanna Kennedy	21 January 1995 (aged 22)	48	2	(Football Australia) Sydney FC
15	FW	Emily Gielnik	13 May 1992 (aged 24)	9	1	(Football Australia) Brisbane Roar
16	FW	Hayley Raso	5 September 1994 (aged 22)	14	1	(Football Australia) Canberra United
17	FW	Kyah Simon	25 June 1991 (aged 25)	70	21	(Football Australia) Sydney FC
18	GK	Mackenzie Arnold	25 February 1994 (aged 23)	11	0	(Football Australia) Brisbane Roar
19	MF	Katrina Gorry	13 August 1992 (aged 24)	49	13	(Football Australia) Brisbane Roar
20	FW	Sam Kerr	10 September 1993 (aged 23)	46	8	(Football Australia) Perth Glory
21	MF	Alex Chidiac	15 January 1999 (aged 18)	1	0	(Football Australia) Adelaide United
22	DF	Emma Checker	11 March 1996 (aged 20)	3	0	(Football Australia) Canberra United

=== China ===
Head coach: (France) Bruno Bini

No.	Pos.	Player	Date of birth (age)	Caps	Goals	Club
1	GK	Zhao Lina	18 September 1991 (aged 25)			(Chinese Football Association) Shanghai Yongbai
2	DF	Liu Shanshan	16 March 1992 (aged 24)			(Chinese Football Association) Hebei China Fortune
3	DF	Ma Yingshuang	3 March 1996 (aged 20)			(Chinese Football Association) Tianjin Huisen
4	DF	Gao Chen	11 August 1992 (aged 24)			(Chinese Football Association) Dalian Quanjian
5	DF	Wu Haiyan (captain)	26 February 1993 (aged 24)			(Chinese Football Association) Shandong Sports Lottery
6	DF	Li Dongna	6 December 1988 (aged 28)			(Chinese Football Association) Dalian Quanjian
7	MF	Yan Jinjin	10 September 1996 (aged 20)			(Chinese Football Association) Shanghai Guotai Junan
8	MF	Tan Ruyin	17 July 1994 (aged 22)			(Chinese Football Association) Guangdong R&F
9	MF	Tang Jiali	16 March 1995 (aged 21)			(Chinese Football Association) Shanghai Guotai Junan
10	FW	Yang Li	31 January 1991 (aged 26)			(Chinese Football Association) Jiangsu Suning
11	FW	Wang Shanshan	27 January 1990 (aged 27)			(Chinese Football Association) Tianjin Huisen
12	MF	Wang Shuang	23 January 1995 (aged 22)			(Chinese Football Association) Dalian Quanjian
13	MF	Li Ying	7 January 1993 (aged 24)			(Chinese Football Association) Shandong Sports Lottery
14	DF	Zhao Rong	2 August 1991 (aged 25)			(Chinese Football Association) Changchun Zhuoyue
16	MF	Yang Man	2 November 1995 (aged 21)			(Chinese Football Association) Shandong Sports Lottery
17	MF	Han Peng	20 December 1989 (aged 27)			(Chinese Football Association) Tianjin Huisen
18	GK	Bi Xiaolin	18 September 1989 (aged 27)			(Chinese Football Association) Dalian Quanjian
19	DF	Wang Yan	22 August 1991 (aged 25)			(Chinese Football Association) Dalian Quanjian
20	MF	Zhang Rui	21 August 1991 (aged 25)			(Chinese Football Association) Liberation Army
21	FW	Lou Jiahui	26 May 1991 (aged 25)			(Chinese Football Association) Henan Jianye
22	GK	Peng Shimeng	12 May 1998 (aged 18)			(Chinese Football Association) Jiangsu Suning
23	MF	Ren Guixin	19 December 1988 (aged 28)			(Chinese Football Association) Changchun Zhuoyue
24	MF	Yao Wei	1 September 1997 (aged 19)			(Chinese Football Association) Wuhan Zall

=== Netherlands ===
Head coach: Sarina Wiegman

No.	Pos.	Player	Date of birth (age)	Caps	Goals	Club
1	GK	Sari van Veenendaal	3 April 1990 (aged 26)	27	0	(The Football Association) Arsenal
2	DF	Desiree van Lunteren	30 December 1992 (aged 24)	39	0	(Royal Dutch Football Association) Ajax
3	DF	Stefanie van der Gragt	16 August 1992 (aged 24)	35	3	(German Football Association) Bayern Munich
4	DF	Mandy van den Berg (captain)	26 August 1990 (aged 26)	79	4	(The Football Association) Reading
6	MF	Anouk Dekker	15 November 1986 (aged 30)	52	5	(French Football Federation) Montpellier
7	FW	Shanice van de Sanden	2 October 1992 (aged 24)	33	9	(The Football Association) Liverpool
8	MF	Sherida Spitse	29 May 1990 (aged 26)	126	19	(Royal Dutch Football Association) Twente
9	FW	Vivianne Miedema	15 July 1996 (aged 20)	42	34	(German Football Association) Bayern Munich
10	MF	Daniëlle van de Donk	5 August 1991 (aged 25)	57	9	(The Football Association) Arsenal
11	FW	Lieke Martens	16 December 1992 (aged 24)	66	25	(Swedish Football Association) Rosengård
12	MF	Tessel Middag	23 December 1992 (aged 24)	39	4	(The Football Association) Manchester City
13	FW	Renate Jansen	7 December 1990 (aged 26)	8	2	(Royal Dutch Football Association) Twente
15	DF	Kika van Es	11 October 1991 (aged 25)	28	0	(Royal Dutch Football Association) Achilles '29
16	GK	Angela Christ	6 March 1989 (aged 27)	15	0	(Royal Dutch Football Association) PSV
17	MF	Kelly Zeeman	19 November 1993 (aged 23)	12	0	(Royal Dutch Football Association) Ajax
18	MF	Jackie Groenen	17 December 1994 (aged 22)	11	1	(German Football Association) 1. FFC Frankfurt
21	FW	Lineth Beerensteyn	11 October 1996 (aged 20)	9	3	(Royal Dutch Football Association) Twente
23	GK	Loes Geurts	12 January 1986 (aged 31)	113	0	(French Football Federation) Paris Saint-Germain
25	MF	Jill Roord	22 April 1997 (aged 19)	11	3	(Royal Dutch Football Association) Twente
27	DF	Sheila van den Bulk	6 April 1989 (aged 27)	1	0	(Swedish Football Association) Djurgården
29	DF	Siri Worm	20 April 1992 (aged 24)	31	0	(Royal Dutch Football Association) Twente
34	MF	Sisca Folkertsma	21 May 1997 (aged 19)	3	0	(Royal Dutch Football Association) PSV
37	DF	Liza van der Most	8 October 1993 (aged 23)	2	0	(Royal Dutch Football Association) Ajax

=== Sweden ===
Head coach: Pia Sundhage

The squad was announced on 8 February 2017.

No.	Pos.	Player	Date of birth (age)	Caps	Goals	Club
1	GK	Hedvig Lindahl	29 April 1983 (aged 33)	132	0	(The Football Association) Chelsea
2	DF	Jonna Andersson	2 January 1993 (aged 24)	11	0	(Swedish Football Association) Linköping
3	DF	Linda Sembrant	15 May 1987 (aged 29)	78	7	(French Football Federation) Montpellier
4	DF	Emma Berglund	19 December 1988 (aged 28)	51	1	(Swedish Football Association) Rosengård
5	DF	Nilla Fischer	2 August 1984 (aged 32)	153	21	(German Football Association) VfL Wolfsburg
6	DF	Magdalena Eriksson	8 September 1993 (aged 23)	20	4	(Swedish Football Association) Linköping
7	MF	Lisa Dahlkvist	6 February 1987 (aged 30)	122	11	(Swedish Football Association) Örebro
8	FW	Lotta Schelin	27 February 1984 (aged 33)	173	85	(Swedish Football Association) Rosengård
9	FW	Kosovare Asllani	29 July 1989 (aged 27)	94	25	(The Football Association) Manchester City
10	MF	Lina Hurtig	5 September 1995 (aged 21)	3	1	(Swedish Football Association) Linköping
11	FW	Stina Blackstenius	5 February 1996 (aged 21)	15	3	(French Football Federation) Montpellier
12	GK	Hilda Carlén	13 August 1991 (aged 25)	5	0	(Swedish Football Association) Piteå
13	MF	Elin Rubensson	11 May 1993 (aged 23)	39	0	(Swedish Football Association) Kopparbergs/Göteborg
14	MF	Hanna Folkesson	15 June 1988 (aged 28)	28	0	(Swedish Football Association) Rosengård
15	DF	Jessica Samuelsson	30 January 1992 (aged 25)	42	0	(Swedish Football Association) Linköping
16	DF	Hanna Glas	16 April 1993 (aged 23)	2	0	(Swedish Football Association) Eskilstuna United
17	MF	Caroline Seger (captain)	19 March 1985 (aged 31)	163	23	(French Football Federation) Lyon
18	FW	Fridolina Rolfö	24 November 1993 (aged 23)	15	4	(German Football Association) Bayern Munich
19	FW	Pauline Hammarlund	7 May 1994 (aged 22)	12	4	(Swedish Football Association) Kopparbergs/Göteborg
20	DF	Hanne Gråhns	29 August 1992 (aged 24)	1	0	(Swedish Football Association) Örebro
21	FW	Mimmi Larsson	9 April 1994 (aged 22)	2	1	(Swedish Football Association) Eskilstuna United
22	MF	Olivia Schough	11 March 1991 (aged 25)	48	8	(Swedish Football Association) Eskilstuna United
23	GK	Zećira Mušović	26 May 1996 (aged 20)	2	0	(Swedish Football Association) Rosengård

== Player representation ==
=== By club ===
Clubs with 5 or more players represented are listed.

Players	Club
10	(Spain) Barcelona
8	(Russia) CSKA Moscow, (Spain) Atlético Madrid, (Sweden) Linköping
7	(Iceland) Valur, (Japan) Nippon TV Beleza
6	(Denmark) Brøndby
5	(China) Dalian Quanjian, (Germany) Bayern Munich, (Germany) Wolfsburg, (Netherlands) Twente, (Norway) Lillestrøm, (Portugal) Sporting CP, (Sweden) Eskilstuna United, (Sweden) Rosengård

=== By club nationality ===
Players	Clubs
28	Sweden
23	China
22	Spain
20	Japan, Russia
19	Australia, Germany
18	Norway, United States
16	Iceland
14	Denmark
13	Portugal
12	France
11	Netherlands
9	England
5	Canada
1	Brazil, Switzerland

=== By club federation ===
Players	Federation
183	UEFA
62	AFC
23	CONCACAF
1	CONMEBOL

=== By representatives of domestic league ===
National squad	Players
China	23
Japan	20
Russia	20
Spain	20
Australia	19
Norway	16
Sweden	16
Iceland	15
Denmark	14
Portugal	13
Netherlands	11
Canada	5
