= 2017–18 in Scottish football =

Football in Scotland
- Season: 2017–18

2017–18 in Scottish football

Premiership champions
- Celtic

Championship champions
- St Mirren

League 1 champions
- Ayr United

League 2 champions
- Montrose

Scottish Cup winners
- Celtic

League Cup winners
- Celtic

Challenge Cup winners
- Inverness Caledonian Thistle

Youth Cup winners
- Hibernian

Teams in Europe
- Celtic, Aberdeen, Rangers, St Johnstone

Scotland national team
- 2018 FIFA World Cup qualification

The 2017–18 season was the 121st season of competitive football in Scotland. The domestic season began on 15 July 2017, with the first round of matches in the 2017–18 Scottish League Cup. The 2017–18 Scottish Professional Football League season commenced on 5 August.

== League competitions ==
=== Scottish Premiership ===
Pos	Team	Pld	W	D	L	GF	GA	GD	Pts	Qualification or relegation (Note: Teams play each other three times (33 matches) before the league is split into two groups (the top six and the bottom six).)
1	Celtic (C)	38	24	10	4	73	25	+48	82	Qualification for the Champions League first qualifying round (Note: Since the winners of the 2017–18 Scottish Cup, Celtic, qualified for European competition based on league position, the spot awarded to the Scottish Cup winners (Europa League second qualifying round) was passed to the second-placed team and the spot awarded to the second-placed team (Europa League first qualifying round) was passed to the fourth-placed team.)
2	Aberdeen	38	22	7	9	56	37	+19	73	Qualification for the Europa League second qualifying round
3	Rangers	38	21	7	10	76	50	+26	70	Qualification for the Europa League first qualifying round
4	Hibernian	38	18	13	7	62	46	+16	67	Qualification for the Europa League first qualifying round
5	Kilmarnock	38	16	11	11	49	47	+2	59	
6	Heart of Midlothian	38	12	13	13	39	39	0	49	
7	Motherwell	38	13	9	16	43	49	−6	48	
8	St Johnstone	38	12	10	16	42	53	−11	46	
9	Dundee	38	11	6	21	36	57	−21	39	
10	Hamilton Academical	38	9	6	23	47	68	−21	33	
11	Partick Thistle (R)	38	8	9	21	31	61	−30	33	Qualification for the Premiership play-off final
12	Ross County (R)	38	6	11	21	40	62	−22	29	Relegation to the Championship

Source: Soccerway BBC
Rules for classification: 1) Points; 2) Goal difference; 3) Goals scored; 4) Play-off (only if deciding champion, UEFA competitions qualification and second-stage group allocation).
(C) Champions; (R) Relegated

=== Scottish Championship ===
Pos	Team	Pld	W	D	L	GF	GA	GD	Pts	Promotion, qualification or relegation
1	St Mirren (C, P)	36	23	5	8	63	36	+27	74	Promotion to the Premiership
2	Livingston (O, P)	36	17	11	8	56	37	+19	62	Qualification for the Premiership play-off semi-final
3	Dundee United	36	18	7	11	52	42	+10	61	Qualification for the Premiership play-off quarter-final
4	Dunfermline Athletic	36	16	11	9	60	35	+25	59	Qualification for the Premiership play-off quarter-final
5	Inverness Caledonian Thistle	36	16	9	11	53	37	+16	57	
6	Queen of the South	36	14	10	12	59	53	+6	52	
7	Greenock Morton	36	13	11	12	47	40	+7	50	
8	Falkirk	36	12	11	13	45	49	−4	47	
9	Dumbarton (R)	36	7	9	20	27	63	−36	30	Qualification for the Championship play-offs
10	Brechin City (R)	36	0	4	32	20	90	−70	4	Relegation to League One

Source: Soccerway
Rules for classification: 1) Points; 2) Goal difference; 3) Goals scored; 4) Points in head-to-head matches; 5) Goal difference in hth matches; 6). Goals scored in hth matches; 7). Play-off (only for deciding promotion, play-off participation and relegation).
(C) Champions; (O) Play-off winners; (P) Promoted; (R) Relegated

=== Scottish League One ===
Pos	Team	Pld	W	D	L	GF	GA	GD	Pts	Promotion, qualification or relegation
1	Ayr United (C, P)	36	24	4	8	92	42	+50	76	Promotion to the Championship
2	Raith Rovers	36	22	9	5	68	32	+36	75	Qualification for the Championship play-offs
3	Alloa Athletic (O, P)	36	17	9	10	56	43	+13	60	Qualification for the Championship play-offs
4	Arbroath	36	17	8	11	70	51	+19	59	Qualification for the Championship play-offs
5	Stranraer	36	16	5	15	58	66	−8	53	
6	East Fife	36	13	3	20	49	67	−18	42	
7	Airdrieonians	36	10	11	15	46	60	−14	41	
8	Forfar Athletic	36	11	5	20	40	65	−25	38	
9	Queen's Park (R)	36	7	10	19	42	72	−30	31	Qualification for the League One play-offs
10	Albion Rovers (R)	36	8	6	22	57	80	−23	30	Relegation to League Two

Source: SPFL
Rules for classification: 1) Points; 2) Goal difference; 3) Number of goals scored
(C) Champions; (O) Play-off winners; (P) Promoted; (R) Relegated

=== Scottish League Two ===
Pos	Team	Pld	W	D	L	GF	GA	GD	Pts	Promotion, qualification or relegation
1	Montrose (C, P)	36	23	8	5	60	35	+25	77	Promotion to League One
2	Peterhead	36	24	4	8	79	39	+40	76	Qualification for the League One play-offs
3	Stirling Albion	36	16	7	13	61	52	+9	55	Qualification for the League One play-offs
4	Stenhousemuir (O, P)	36	15	9	12	56	47	+9	54	Qualification for the League One play-offs
5	Clyde	36	14	9	13	52	50	+2	51	
6	Elgin City	36	14	7	15	54	61	−7	49	
7	Annan Athletic	36	12	11	13	49	41	+8	47	
8	Berwick Rangers	36	9	10	17	31	59	−28	37	
9	Edinburgh City	36	7	9	20	37	62	−25	30	
10	Cowdenbeath (O)	36	4	10	22	23	56	−33	22	Qualification for the League Two play-off final

Source: SPFL
Rules for classification: 1) Points; 2) Goal difference; 3) Number of goals scored
(C) Champions; (O) Play-off winners; (P) Promoted

=== Non-league football ===
==== Level 5 ====
Highland Football League
Pos	Team	Pld	Pts
1	Cove Rangers (C)	34	90
2	Formartine United	34	79
3	Inverurie Loco Works	34	78
4	Fraserburgh	34	73
5	Forres Mechanics	34	73
6	Brora Rangers	34	63
7	Buckie Thistle	34	51
8	Deveronvale	34	51
9	Nairn County	34	51
10	Rothes	34	49
11	Huntly	34	49
12	Wick Academy	34	46
13	Clachnacuddin	34	41
14	Turriff United	34	37
15	Keith	34	16
16	Lossiemouth	34	15
17	Strathspey Thistle	34	14
18	Fort William	34	5

Source: Highland Football League
(C) Champions

Lowland Football League
Pos	Team	Pld	Pts
1	The Spartans (C)	30	73
2	East Kilbride	30	71
3	BSC Glasgow	30	65
4	East Stirlingshire	30	64
5	Selkirk	30	48
6	Cumbernauld Colts	30	41
7	Civil Service Strollers	30	40
8	Gretna 2008	30	40
9	Stirling University	30	38
10	Edusport Academy	30	34
11	Edinburgh University	30	34
12	Whitehill Welfare	30	34
13	Gala Fairydean Rovers	30	31
14	Dalbeattie Star	30	29
15	Vale of Leithen	30	29
16	Hawick Royal Albert (R)	30	6

Source: SLFL Soccerway
(C) Champions;
(R) Relegated

==== Level 6 ====
East of Scotland Football League
Pos	Team	Pld	Pts
1	Kelty Hearts (C, O, P)	24	69
2	Lothian Thistle Hutchison Vale	24	67
3	Preston Athletic	24	51
4	Leith Athletic	24	49
5	Tynecastle	24	39
6	Heriot-Watt University	24	39
7	Peebles Rovers	24	38
8	Burntisland Shipyard	24	25
9	Stirling University Reserves	24	24
10	Coldstream	24	18
11	Eyemouth United	24	18
12	Ormiston	24	12
13	Tweedmouth Rangers	24	4

Source: East of Scotland Football League
(C) Champions;
(O) Play-off winners;
(P) Promoted

South of Scotland Football League
Pos	Team	Pld	Pts
1	Threave Rovers (C)	28	73
2	Mid-Annandale	28	66
3	Lochar Thistle	28	63
4	St Cuthbert Wanderers	28	54
5	Abbey Vale	28	49
6	Bonnyton Thistle	28	46
7	Heston Rovers	28	46
8	Stranraer reserves	28	42
9	Newton Stewart	28	38
10	Upper Annandale	28	37
11	Nithsdale Wanderers	28	36
12	Lochmaben	28	33
13	Annan Athletic reserves	28	10
14	Creetown	28	11
15	Dumfries YMCA	28	6
16	Wigtown & Bladnoch	0	0

Source: South of Scotland Football League
(C) Champions

=== SPFL Development League ===
Pos	Team	Pld	W	D	L	GF	GA	GD	Pts
1	Hibernian (C)	26	19	2	5	72	35	+37	59
2	Dundee	26	16	5	5	52	33	+19	53
3	Heart of Midlothian	26	17	1	8	62	43	+19	52
4	Aberdeen	26	14	5	7	49	30	+19	47
5	Motherwell	26	14	3	9	45	34	+11	45
6	Celtic	26	13	5	8	49	27	+22	44
7	Ross County	26	11	7	8	56	52	+4	40
8	Hamilton Academical	26	11	6	9	46	38	+8	39
9	Dundee United	26	9	1	16	37	61	−24	28
10	St Mirren	26	7	5	14	43	59	−16	26
11	St Johnstone	26	7	5	14	41	57	−16	26
12	Partick Thistle	26	6	4	16	36	65	−29	22
13	Kilmarnock	26	6	1	19	29	53	−24	19
14	Falkirk	26	5	4	17	26	56	−30	19

Source: SPFL
Rules for classification: 1) Points; 2) Goal difference; 3) Number of goals scored
(C) Champions

Development League Champions

Competition	Winner	Ref
Development League	Hibernian	
Development League West	Greenock Morton	
Development League East	Raith Rovers	

== Honours ==
=== Cup honours ===
Competition	Winner	Score	Runner-up	Match report
2017–18 Scottish Cup	Celtic	2–0	Motherwell	BBC Sport
2017–18 League Cup	Celtic	2–0	Motherwell	BBC Sport
2017–18 Challenge Cup	Inverness CT	1–0	Dumbarton	BBC Sport
2017–18 Youth Cup	Hibernian	3–1	Aberdeen	BBC Sport
2017–18 Junior Cup	Auchinleck Talbot	3–2	Hurlford United	BBC Sport

=== Non-league honours ===
==== Senior ====
Competition	Winner
Highland League	Cove Rangers
Lowland League	Spartans
East of Scotland League	Kelty Hearts
South of Scotland League	Threave Rovers

==== Junior ====
West Region

Division	Winner
Super League Premier Division	Beith
Super League First Division	Petershill
Ayrshire District League	Dalry Thistle
Central District League First Division	Rossvale
Central District League Second Division	Royal Albert

East Region

Division	Winner
Superleague	Bonnyrigg Rose Athletic
Premier League	Musselburgh Athletic
North Division	Dundee North End
South Division	Pumpherston

North Region

Division	Winner
Superleague	Banks O’Dee
First Division (West)	Nairn St Ninian
First Division (East)	East End

=== Individual honours ===
==== PFA Scotland awards ====
Award	Winner	Team
Players' Player of the Year	Scott Brown	Celtic
Young Player of the Year	Kieran Tierney	Celtic
Manager of the Year	Jack Ross	St Mirren
Championship Player	Lewis Morgan	St Mirren
League One Player	Lawrence Shankland	Ayr United
League Two Player	Darren Smith	Stirling Albion

==== SFWA awards ====
Award	Winner	Team
Footballer of the Year	Scott Brown	Celtic
Young Player of the Year	Kieran Tierney	Celtic
Manager of the Year	Steve Clarke	Kilmarnock
International Player of the Year	Leigh Griffiths	Celtic

==== SPFL awards ====
Award	Winner	Team
Premiership Manager	Brendan Rodgers	Celtic
Premiership Player	Scott Brown	Celtic
Championship Manager	Jack Ross	St Mirren
Championship Player	Lewis Morgan	St Mirren
League One Manager	Ian McCall	Ayr United
League One Player	Lawrence Shankland	Ayr United
League Two Manager	Stewart Petrie	Montrose
League Two Player	Seán Dillon	Montrose

== Scottish clubs in Europe ==
=== Summary ===
Celtic, Aberdeen, Rangers and St Johnstone qualified for European competition. Rangers and St Johnstone were both eliminated in the first qualifying round, which prompted some administrators and coaches to suggest that Scottish football should adopt a summer season.

Club	Competitions	Started round	Final round	Coef.
Celtic	UEFA Champions League	Second qualifying round	Group Stage	12.5
Celtic	UEFA Europa League	Round of 32		12.5
Aberdeen	UEFA Europa League	Second qualifying round	Third qualifying round	2.5
Rangers	UEFA Europa League	First qualifying round		1.0
St Johnstone	UEFA Europa League	First qualifying round		1.0
Total				16.0
Average				4.000

=== Celtic ===
UEFA Champions League

Celtic started in the second qualifying round of the 2017–18 UEFA Champions League, and were drawn against the winners of a first round tie between Linfield and Fiorita.

14 July 2017 QR2	Linfield (Northern Ireland)	0–2	(Scotland) Celtic	Belfast
		BBC Sport	Sinclair 17'; Rogic 22'	Stadium: Windsor Park; Referee: Alejandro Hernández Hernández (Spain)

19 July 2017 QR2	Celtic (Scotland)	4–0 (6–0 agg.)	(Northern Ireland) Linfield	Glasgow
	Sinclair 4', 54'; Rogic 46'; Armstrong 90+2'	BBC Sport		Stadium: Celtic Park; Referee: Stephan Klossner (Switzerland)

26 July 2017 QR3	Celtic (Scotland)	0–0	(Norway) Rosenborg	Glasgow
		BBC Sport		Stadium: Celtic Park; Referee: Tiago Martins (Portugal)

2 August 2017 QR3	Rosenborg (Norway)	0–1 (0–1 agg.)	(Scotland) Celtic	Trondheim
		BBC Sport	Forrest 69'	Stadium: Lerkendal Stadion; Referee: Jonathan Lardot (Belgium)

16 August 2017 PO	Celtic (Scotland)	5–0	(Kazakhstan) Astana	Glasgow
	Postnikov 32' (o.g.); Sinclair 42', 60'; Forrest 79'; Shitov 88' (o.g.)	BBC Sport		Stadium: Celtic Park; Referee: Ovidiu Hategan (Romania)

22 August 2017 PO	Astana (Kazakhstan)	4–3 (4–8 agg.)	(Scotland) Celtic	Astana
	Ajer 26' (o.g.); Muzhikov 48'; Twumasi 49', 69'	BBC Sport	Sinclair 33'; Ntcham 80'; Griffiths 90'	Stadium: Astana Arena; Referee: Pavel Královec (Czech Republic)

12 September 2017 Group B	Celtic (Scotland)	0–5	(France) Paris Saint-Germain	Glasgow
		BBC Sport	Neymar 19'; Mbappé 34'; Cavani 40' (pen.), 85'; Lustig 83' (o.g.)	Stadium: Celtic Park; Attendance: 57,562; Referee: Daniele Orsato (Italy)

27 September 2017 Group B	Anderlecht (Belgium)	0–3	(Scotland) Celtic	Brussels
		BBC Sport	Griffiths 38'; Roberts 50'; Sinclair 90+3'	Stadium: Constant Vanden Stock Stadium; Attendance: 19,898; Referee: Jesús Gil Manzano (Spain)

18 October 2017 Group B	Bayern Munich (Germany)	3–0	(Scotland) Celtic	Munich
	Müller 17'; Kimmich 29'; Hummels 51'	Report		Stadium: Allianz Arena; Attendance: 70,000; Referee: Sergei Karasev (Russia)

31 October 2017 Group B	Celtic (Scotland)	1–2	(Germany) Bayern Munich	Glasgow
	McGregor 74'	Report	Coman 22'; Martinez 77'	Stadium: Celtic Park; Attendance: 58,269; Referee: Danny Makkelie (Netherlands)

22 November 2017 Group B	Paris Saint-Germain (France)	7–1	(Scotland) Celtic	Paris
	Neymar 9', 22'; Cavani 28', 79'; Mbappé 35'; Verratti 75'; Alves 80'	Report	Dembele 1'	Stadium: Parc des Princes; Attendance: 46,288; Referee: Anastasios Sidiropoulos (Greece)

5 December 2017 Group B	Celtic (Scotland)	0–1	(Belgium) Anderlecht	Glasgow
		Report	Simunovic 62' (o.g.)	Stadium: Celtic Park; Attendance: 57,931; Referee: Matej Jug (Slovenia)

UEFA Europa League

Celtic finished third in their Champions League group, which meant that they progressed to the last 32 of the Europa League.

15 February 2018 R32	Celtic (Scotland)	1–0	(Russia) Zenit St Petersburg	Glasgow
	McGregor 78'	BBC Sport		Stadium: Celtic Park; Attendance: 56,743; Referee: Damir Skomina (Slovenia)

22 February 2018 R32	Zenit St Petersburg (Russia)	3–0 (3–1 agg.)	(Scotland) Celtic	Saint Petersburg
	Ivanović 8'; Kuzyayev 27'; Kokorin 61'	BBC Sport		Stadium: Krestovsky Stadium; Attendance: 50,492; Referee: Antonio Mateu Lahoz (Spain)

=== Aberdeen ===
UEFA Europa League

Aberdeen started in the second qualifying round of the 2017–18 UEFA Europa League, and were drawn against the winners of a first round tie between Ordabasy and Široki Brijeg.

13 July 2017 QR2	Aberdeen (Scotland)	1–1	(Bosnia and Herzegovina) Široki Brijeg	Aberdeen
	Christie 17'	BBC Sport	Marković 69'	Stadium: Pittodrie Stadium; Referee: Erik Lambrechts (Belgium)

20 July 2017 QR2	Široki Brijeg (Bosnia and Herzegovina)	0–2 (1–3 agg.)	(Scotland) Aberdeen	Široki Brijeg
		BBC Sport	72' Stewart; 78' Mackay-Steven	Stadium: Stadion Pecara; Referee: Michael Tykgaard (Denmark)

27 July 2017 QR3	Aberdeen (Scotland)	2–1	(Cyprus) Apollon Limassol	Aberdeen
	Christie 4'; Shinnie 78'	BBC Sport	59' Jander	Stadium: Pittodrie Stadium; Referee: Mattias Gestranius (Finland)

3 August 2017 QR3	Apollon Limassol (Cyprus)	2–0 (3–2 agg.)	(Scotland) Aberdeen	Larnaca
	Schembri 17'; Zelaya 86'	BBC Sport		Stadium: AEK Arena; Referee: Stephan Klossner (Switzerland)

=== Rangers ===
UEFA Europa League

29 June 2017 QR1	Rangers (Scotland)	1–0	(Luxembourg) Progrès Niederkorn	Glasgow
	Miller 37'	BBC Sport		Stadium: Ibrox Stadium; Referee: Mohammed Al-Hakim (Sweden)

4 July 2017 QR1	Progrès Niederkorn (Luxembourg)	2–0 (2–1 agg.)	(Scotland) Rangers	Luxembourg City
	Francoise 66'; Thill 75'	BBC Sport		Stadium: Stade Josy Barthel; Referee: Vilhjalmur Thorarinsson (Iceland)

=== St Johnstone ===
UEFA Europa League

29 June 2017 QR1	St Johnstone (Scotland)	1–2	(Lithuania) Trakai	Perth
	Shaughnessy 32'	BBC Sport	14' Maksimov; 36' Silenas	Stadium: McDiarmid Park; Referee: Fran Jovic (Croatia)

6 July 2017 QR1	Trakai (Lithuania)	1–0 (3–1 agg.)	(Scotland) St Johnstone	Vilnius
	Maksimov 88'	BBC Sport		Stadium: LFF Stadium; Referee: Stanislav Todorov (Bulgaria)

== Scotland national team ==
1 September 2017 World Cup qualification	Lithuania	0–3	Scotland	Vilnius
		BBC Sport	25' Armstrong; 30' Robertson; 72' McArthur	Stadium: LFF Stadium; Attendance: 5,067; Referee: Carlos del Cerro Grande (Spain)

4 September 2017 World Cup qualification	Scotland	2–0	Malta	Glasgow
	Berra 9'; Griffiths 49'	BBC Sport		Stadium: Hampden Park; Attendance: 26,371; Referee: Jakob Kehlet (Denmark)

5 October 2017 World Cup qualification	Scotland	1–0	Slovakia	Glasgow
	Skrtel 89' (o.g.)	BBC Sport		Stadium: Hampden Park; Referee: Milorad Mažić (Serbia)

8 October 2017 World Cup qualification	Slovenia	2–2	Scotland	Ljubljana
	Bezjak 52', 72'	BBC Sport	32' Griffiths; 88' Snodgrass	Stadium: Stožice Stadium; Referee: Jonas Eriksson (Sweden)

9 November 2017 Friendly match	Scotland	0–1	Netherlands	Aberdeen
		BBC Sport	40' Depay	Stadium: Pittodrie Stadium; Attendance: 17,883; Referee: Ruddy Buquet (France)

23 March 2018 Friendly match	Scotland	0–1	Costa Rica	Glasgow
		BBC Sport	14' Urena	Stadium: Hampden Park; Attendance: 20,488; Referee: Tobias Stieler (Germany)

27 March 2018 Friendly match	Hungary	0–1	Scotland	Budapest
		BBC Sport	48' Phillips	Stadium: Groupama Arena; Referee: Harald Lechner (Austria)

29 May 2018 Friendly match	Peru	2–0	Scotland	Lima
	Cueva 37' (pen.); Farfan 47'	BBC Sport		Stadium: Estadio Nacional; Referee: Fernando Guerrero Ramírez (Mexico)

2 June 2018 Friendly match	Mexico	1–0	Scotland	Mexico City
	dos Santos 13'	BBC Sport		Stadium: Estadio Azteca; Attendance: 70,993; Referee: Henry Bejarano (Costa Rica)

== Women's football ==
=== League and Cup honours ===
Division	Winner
2017 SWPL 1	Glasgow City
2017 SWPL 2	Forfar Farmington
2017 SWFL First Division (North)	Central Girls
2017 SWFL First Division (South)	Kilmarnock
2017 SWFL Second Division (West)	
2017 SWFL Second Division (Central)	
2017 SWFL Second Division (East)	

Competition	Winner	Score	Runner-up	Match report
2017 Scottish Women's Cup	Hibernian	3–0	Glasgow City	BBC Sport
2017 Scottish Women's Premier League Cup	Hibernian	4–1	Celtic	BBC Sport
SWFL First Division Cup				
SWFL Second Division Cup				

=== Individual honours ===
==== SWPL awards ====
Award	Winner	Team
Players' Player of the Year		
Player of the Year		
Manager of the Year		
Young Player of the Year		

=== Scottish Women's Premier League ===
Pos	Team	Pld	W	D	L	GF	GA	GD	Pts	Qualification or relegation
1	Glasgow City (C)	21	19	2	0	70	4	+66	59	2018–19 Champions League
2	Hibernian	21	18	0	3	75	14	+61	54	
3	Celtic	21	11	2	8	54	30	+24	35	
4	Stirling University	21	8	4	9	26	39	−13	28	
5	Spartans	21	8	4	9	26	46	−20	28	
6	Rangers	21	6	2	13	33	51	−18	20	
7	Hamilton Academical	21	4	1	16	15	50	−35	13	
8	Aberdeen (R)	21	1	3	17	16	81	−65	6	2018 SWPL 2

Source: Soccerway
Rules for classification: 1) Points; 2) Goal difference; 3) Number of goals scored
(C) Champions; (R) Relegated

=== UEFA Women's Champions League ===
==== Glasgow City ====
Glasgow City entered the Champions League in the round of 32.

4 October 2017 Round of 32	BIIK Kazygurt (Kazakhstan)	3–0	(Scotland) Glasgow City	Shymkent
	Kirgizbaeva; Korte; Gabelia	BBC Sport		Stadium: Kazhymukan Munaitpasov Stadium; Referee: Eleni Antoniou (Greece)

12 October 2017 Round of 32	Glasgow City (Scotland)	4–1 (4–4 agg.)	(Kazakhstan) BIIK Kazygurt	Glasgow
	Abbi Grant (3); Noelle Murray	BBC Sport	Chinwendu Ihezuo	Stadium: Petershill Park

==== Hibernian ====
22 August 2017 Qualifying group 2	Hibernian (Scotland)	5–0	(Wales) Swansea City	Cluj-Napoca, Romania
	Small 11'; Turner 18'; Graham 42' (pen.), 87'; Hunter 48'	BBC Sport		Stadium: Cluj Arena; Referee: Julia-Stefanie Baier (Austria)

25 August 2017 Qualifying group 2	Zhytlobud-2 Kharkiv (Ukraine)	1–1	(Scotland) Hibernian	Cluj-Napoca, Romania
	Malakhova 43'	BBC Sport	Graham 80'	Stadium: Cluj Arena; Referee: Julia-Stefanie Baier (Austria)

28 August 2017 Qualifying group 2	Hibernian (Scotland)	1–1	(Romania) Olimpia Cluj	Cluj-Napoca, Romania
	Graham 84'	BBC Sport	Lunca 5'	Stadium: Cluj Arena; Referee: Florence Guillemin (France)

=== Scotland women's national team ===
7 July 2017 Friendly	Scotland	1–0	Republic of Ireland	Kirkcaldy
	Murray 85'	BBC Sport		Stadium: Stark's Park

19 July 2017 Euro 2017 Group D	England	6–0	Scotland	Utrecht
18:00 CEST	Taylor 11', 26', 53'; White 32'; Nobbs 87'; Duggan 90+3'	UEFA		Stadium: Stadion Galgenwaard; Attendance: 5,578; Referee: Esther Staubli (Switzerland)

23 July 2017 Euro 2017 Group D	Scotland	1–2	Portugal	Rotterdam
18:00 CEST	Cuthbert 68'	UEFA	27' C. Mendes; 72' Leite	Stadium: Het Kasteel; Attendance: 3,123; Referee: Katalin Kulcsár (Hungary)

27 July 2017 Euro 2017 Group D	Scotland	1–0	Spain	Deventer
20:45 CEST	Weir 42'	UEFA		Stadium: De Adelaarshorst; Attendance: 4,840; Referee: Jana Adámková (Czechia)

14 September 2017 Friendly	Hungary	0–3	Scotland	Telki
		BBC Sport	15' Clelland; 27' Emslie; 89' Ross	Stadium: Telki Training Centre

19 October 2017 2019 WCQ Group 2	Belarus	1–2	Scotland	Minsk
	Kharlanova 25'	BBC Sport	28' Ross; 62' (o.g.) Kozyupa	Stadium: FC Minsk Stadium; Referee: Nelli Stepanyan (Armenia)

24 October 2017 2019 WCQ Group 2	Scotland	5–0	Albania	Paisley
	Begolli 21' (o.g.); Brown 33'; Ross 54'; Emslie 56'; Evans 82'	BBC Sport		Stadium: St Mirren Park; Referee: Dimitrina Milkova (Bulgaria)

19 January 2018 Friendly	Scotland	0–3	Norway	La Manga
		BBC Sport	Herlovsen; Thorisdottir	Stadium: La Manga Stadium

22 January 2018 Friendly	Scotland	0–0	Russia	Murcia
		BBC Sport		Stadium: Pinatar Football Arena

3 March 2018 Friendly	Scotland	2–0	New Zealand	La Manga
	Ross; Evans	BBC Sport		Stadium: La Manga Stadium

6 March 2018 Friendly	Scotland	2–0	New Zealand	La Manga
	Ross; Brown	BBC Sport		Stadium: La Manga Stadium

5 April 2018 2019 WCQ Group 2	Switzerland	1–0	Scotland	Schaffhausen
	Dickenmann 32'	BBC Sport		Stadium: LIPO Park; Referee: Olga Zadinová

10 April 2018 2019 WCQ Group 2	Scotland	3–0	Poland	Paisley
	Ness 79'; Emslie 87'; Cuthbert 90+2'	BBC Sport		Stadium: St Mirren Park; Attendance: 2,121; Referee: Dr. Riem Hussein

7 June 2018 2019 WCQ Group 2	Scotland	2–1	Belarus	Falkirk
	Cuthbert 45+2', 65'	BBC Sport	Olkhovik 27'	Stadium: Falkirk Stadium; Attendance: 2,007; Referee: Lois Otte

12 June 2018 2019 WCQ Group 2	Poland	2–3	Scotland	Kielce
	Jaszek 6'; Howard 66' (o.g.)	BBC Sport	Little 78'; Ross 80'; Evans 90'	Stadium: Kielce City Stadium; Attendance: 4,410; Referee: Stéphanie Frappart

== Deaths ==
- 2 July: Billy Cook, 77, Kilmarnock defender.
- 2 July: John McCormick, 80, Third Lanark and Aberdeen defender.
- 5 July: John McKenzie, 91, Partick Thistle, Dumbarton and Scotland winger.
- 15 July: Davie Laing, 92, Heart of Midlothian, Clyde and Hibernian wing half.
- 19 July: Joe Walters, 82, Clyde, Albion Rovers and Stenhousemuir wing half.
- 2 August: Dave Caldwell, 85, Aberdeen and Morton left back.
- 15 August: Joe McGurn, 52, St Johnstone, Alloa and Stenhousemuir forward.
- 16 August: John Ogston, 78, Aberdeen goalkeeper.
- 12 September: Bert McCann, 84, Dundee United, Queen's Park, Motherwell, Hamilton and Scotland wing half.
- 18 September: Paul Wilson, 66, Celtic, Motherwell and Partick Thistle midfielder.
- 1 October: John Swinburne, 87, Motherwell director.
- 6 October: Ian McNeill, 85, Aberdeen forward and Ross County manager.
- 9 October: Jimmy Reid, 81, Dundee United, East Fife, Arbroath and Brechin City forward.
- 31 October: Stefano Salvatori, 49, Hearts midfielder.
- 15 November: Bert Ormond, 86, Falkirk, Airdrieonians and Dumbarton forward.
- 28 November: Jimmy McEwan, 88, Arbroath and Raith Rovers winger.
- 26 December: Willie Penman, 78, Rangers inside forward.
- 2 January: Mike McCartney, 63, Gretna manager.
- 2 January: Felix Reilly, 84, Dunfermline and East Fife forward.
- 9 January: Tommy Lawrence, 77, Scotland goalkeeper.
- 10 January: John McGlashan, 50, Montrose, Dundee, Arbroath and Ross County midfielder; Arbroath manager.
- 9 February: Liam Miller, 36, Celtic and Hibernian midfielder.
- 19 February: John Orr, 72, Kilmarnock chairman (2001–03).
- 28 February: John Muir, 70, Alloa Athletic and St Johnstone forward.
- 4 March: Alex Rennie, 69, Stirling Albion, St Johnstone and Dundee United defender; St Johnstone and Stenhousemuir manager.
- 6 March: John Kurila, 76, Celtic wing half.
- 19 March: George Meek, 84, Hamilton winger.
- 28 March: Ron Mailer, 85, Dunfermline wing half.
- 4 April: Ray Wilkins, 61, Rangers and Hibernian midfielder.
- 10 April: John Lambie, 77, Falkirk and St Johnstone defender; Hamilton, Partick Thistle and Falkirk manager.
- 27 April: George Mulhall, 81, Aberdeen, Morton and Scotland winger.
- May: Bill McCarry, 79, Falkirk, St Johnstone and Stirling Albion centre half / centre forward.
- 28 May: Neale Cooper, 54, Aberdeen, Rangers, Dunfermline and Ross County midfielder; Ross County and Peterhead manager.
- 2 June: John Ritchie, 70, Cowdenbeath, Brechin City and Dundee United goalkeeper; Brechin City manager.
- 14 June: Allan Presslie, 77, Caledonian, Arbroath, Buckie Thistle and Elgin City centre half.
- 21 June: Johnny Hubbard, 87, Rangers and Ayr United winger.
- 23 June: Douglas Rae, 87, Morton chairman.
- 26 June: Harold Davis, 85, East Fife, Rangers and Partick Thistle wing half; Queen's Park and Queen of the South manager.
- c.26 June: Ronnie Sheed, 71, Kilmarnock and Partick Thistle midfielder.
