= 2018 Scottish Women's Premier League 2 =

Scottish Women's Premier League 2
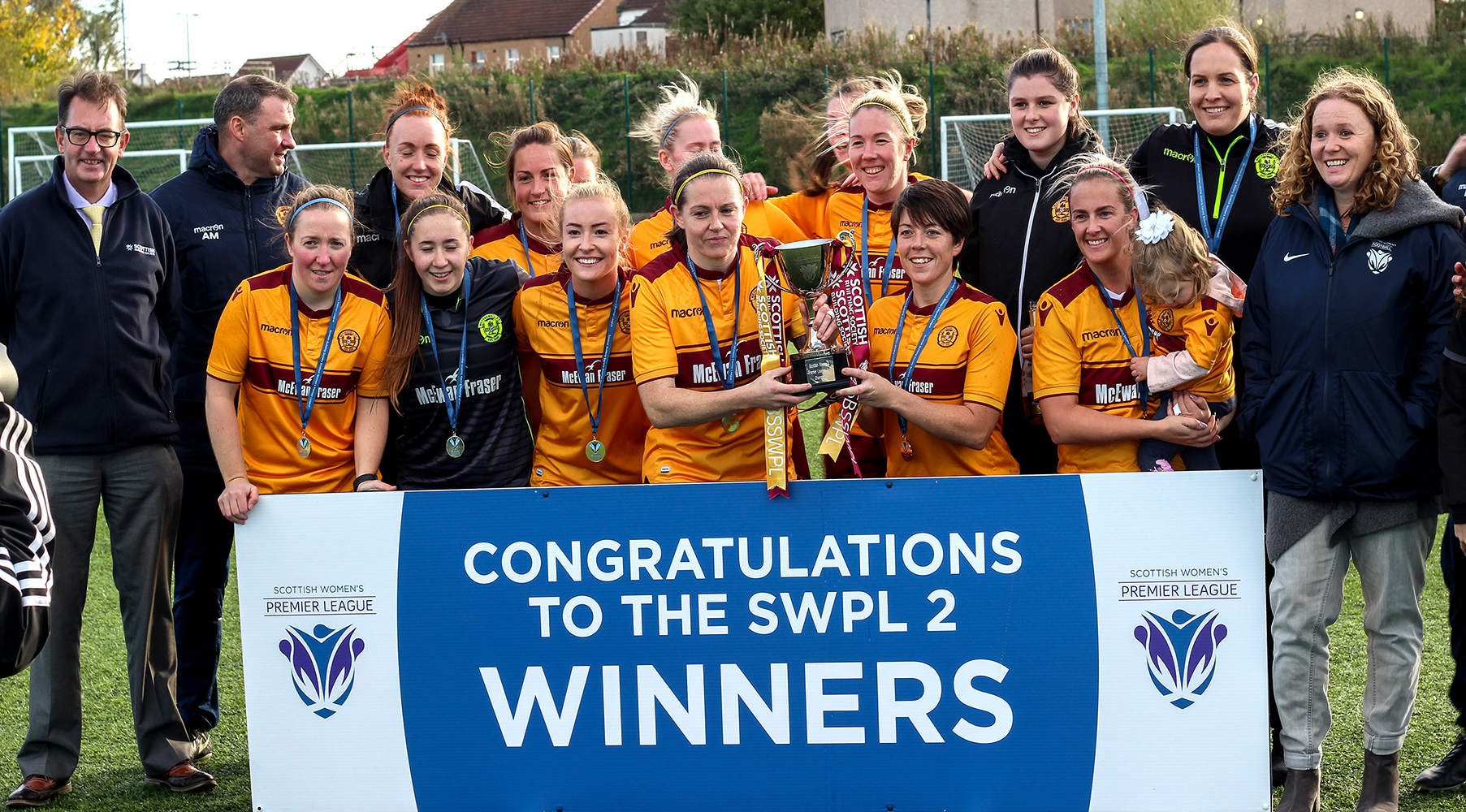
- Motherwell Ladies are presented with the 2018 SWPL 2 trophy by SWF
- Season: 2018
- Champions: Motherwell
- Promoted: Motherwell
- Relegated: Central Girls
- Matches played: 80
- Goals scored: 341 (4.26 per match)
- Top goalscorer: Suzanne Mulvey (21 goals)
- All statistics correct as of 21 October 2018.

The 2018 Scottish Women's Premier League 2 was the third season of the SWPL 2 as the second-highest division of women's football in Scotland, below SWPL 1 and above SWFL 1.

== Teams ==
Locations of teams in the 2018 SWPL 2

| Team | Location | Home ground | Capacity | 2017 position |
|---|---|---|---|---|
| Aberdeen | Aberdeen | Heathryfold Park, Aberdeen | 2,200 | 8th in SWPL 1 (relegated) |
| Central Girls Football Academy | Grangemouth | Indodrill Stadium, Alloa | 3,100 | 1st in SWFL North (promoted) |
| Edinburgh University Hutchison Vale | Edinburgh | Peffermill Sports Ground, Edinburgh | 1,000 | 4th |
| Glasgow Girls | Glasgow | Greenfield Football Centre, Carntyne | 1,000 | 2nd |
| Hearts | Edinburgh | Kings Park, Dalkeith | 1,000 | 6th |
| Kilmarnock | Kilmarnock | Rugby Park, Kilmarnock | 17,889 | 1st in SWFL South (promoted) |
| Motherwell | Wishaw | Ravenscraig, Motherwell | 13,677 | 3rd |
| St Johnstone | Perth | McDiarmid Park, Perth | 10,696 | 5th |

== Format ==
Teams play each other three times. The top team wins the championship and is promoted, with the bottom two teams relegated.

== Standings ==
Teams play 21 matches each.

| Pos | Team | Pld | W | D | L | GF | GA | GD | Pts | Qualification or relegation |
|---|---|---|---|---|---|---|---|---|---|---|
| 1 | Motherwell (Note: FC Kilmarnock were awarded a 3–0 win against Motherwell on 22 February 2018 after they failed to hand a team line to their opponents and the referee 45 minutes before kick-off. The match had finished 2–1 to Motherwell.) (C, P) | 21 | 18 | 2 | 1 | 90 | 19 | +71 | 56 | Promotion to SWPL 1 |
| 2 | FC Kilmarnock | 21 | 10 | 5 | 6 | 41 | 32 | +9 | 35 | |
| 3 | Heart of Midlothian | 21 | 10 | 4 | 7 | 39 | 30 | +9 | 34 | |
| 4 | St Johnstone | 21 | 9 | 4 | 8 | 39 | 40 | −1 | 31 | |
| 5 | Edinburgh University Hutchison Vale | 21 | 8 | 6 | 7 | 55 | 43 | +12 | 30 | |
| 6 | Glasgow Girls | 21 | 8 | 4 | 9 | 43 | 48 | −5 | 28 | |
| 7 | Aberdeen (Note: Three Aberdeen victories in August were annulled due to fielding an ineligible player, but the original results were reinstated on appeal.) (R) | 21 | 4 | 3 | 14 | 29 | 53 | −24 | 15 | Relegation to SWFL Division 1 |
| 8 | Central Girls (R) | 21 | 2 | 2 | 17 | 24 | 95 | −71 | 8 | |

Source: Soccerway
Rules for classification: 1) Points; 2) Goal difference; 3) Number of goals scored
(C) Champions; (P) Promoted; (R) Relegated

== Results ==
=== Matches 1 to 14 ===
| Home \ Away | ABE | CEN | EUH | GLG | HOM | KIL | MOT | STJ |
|---|---|---|---|---|---|---|---|---|
| Aberdeen | | 2–2 | 4–0 | 2–3 | | 1–5 | 1–1 | 0–2 |
| Central Girls | 4–1 | | 0–12 | 2–7 | 1–4 | 1–2 | 2–7 | 1–1 |
| Edinburgh University Hutchison Vale | 1–1 | 2–0 | | 5–1 | 1–1 | 2–2 | 1–5 | 4–0 |
| Glasgow Girls | 1–4 | 3–2 | 2–2 | | 2–0 | 1–1 | 2–6 | 4–0 |
| Heart of Midlothian | 4–1 | 4–3 | 1–0 | 2–0 | | 0–1 | 1–4 | 1–1 |
| FC Kilmarnock | 1–0 | 2–1 | 3–2 | 0–1 | 0–0 | | 3–0 | 2–3 |
| Motherwell | 6–0 | 3–1 | 8–0 | 7–0 | 2–1 | 2–0 | | 6–0 |
| St Johnstone | 2–0 | 1–3 | 3–3 | 3–0 | 3–1 | 4–2 | 1–2 | |

Updated to match(es) played on 21 October 2018. Source: Scottish Women's Football
Legend: Blue = home team win; Yellow = draw; Red = away team win.

=== Matches 15 to 21 ===
| Home \ Away | ABE | CEN | EUH | GLG | HOM | KIL | MOT | STJ |
|---|---|---|---|---|---|---|---|---|
| Aberdeen | | 7–0 | 1–3 | | | | 0–4 | 0–3 |
| Central Girls | | | 0–7 | | | 1–4 | | |
| Edinburgh University Hutchison Vale | | | | 3–3 | 1–2 | | | 0–2 |
| Glasgow Girls | 3–0 | | | | | | 2–3 | 0–3 |
| Heart of Midlothian | 3–0 | | | 3–0 | | 4–5 | | |
| FC Kilmarnock | 4–0 | | | 0–0 | | | 2–3 | |
| Motherwell | | 9–0 | 6–0 | | 1–1 | | | |
| St Johnstone | | 6–0 | | | 0–2 | 2–2 | | |

Updated to match(es) played on 21 October 2018. Source: Scottish Women's Football
Legend: Blue = home team win; Yellow = draw; Red = away team win.

== Annual awards ==
| Award | Winner | Club | References |
|---|---|---|---|
| SWPL 2 Golden Boot | (Scotland) Suzanne Mulvey | Motherwell | |
| SWPL 2 Player of the Year | (Scotland) Suzanne Mulvey | Motherwell | |
