= UEFA Women's Euro 2017 Group D =

Football tournament group stage

Group D of UEFA Women's Euro 2017 contained England, Portugal, Scotland and Spain. The matches were played from 19 to 27 July 2017.

== Teams ==
Draw position	Team	Method of qualification	Date of qualification	Finals appearance	Last appearance	Previous best performance	UEFA ranking for final draw	FIFA ranking at start of event
D1	England	Group 7 winners	7 June 2016	8th	2013	Runners-up (1984, 2009)	3	5
D2	Scotland	Group 1 runners-up	16 September 2016	1st	—	Debut	11	21
D3	Spain	Group 2 winners	7 June 2016	3rd	2013	Semi-finals (1997)	6	13
D4	Portugal	Play-offs winner	25 October 2016	1st	—	Debut	23	38

== Standings ==
Pos	Team	Pld	W	D	L	GF	GA	GD	Pts	Qualification
1	England	3	3	0	0	10	1	+9	9	Knockout stage
2	Spain	3	1	0	2	2	3	−1	3 (Note: Tied on head-to-head points (3). Head-to-head goal difference: Spain +1, Scotland 0, Portugal −1.)	Knockout stage
3	Scotland	3	1	0	2	2	8	−6	3	
4	Portugal	3	1	0	2	3	5	−2	3	

Source: UEFA
Rules for classification: Group stage tiebreakers
Notes:

In the quarter-finals:

- The winners of Group D, England, advance to play the runners-up of Group C, France.
- The runners-up of Group D, Spain, advance to play the winners of Group C, Austria.

== Matches ==
All times are local (UTC+2).

=== Spain vs Portugal ===
19 July 2017
18:00

Spain	2–0	Portugal
Losada 23'; Sampedro 42'	Report

De Vijverberg, Doetinchem
Attendance: 3,188
Referee: Pernilla Larsson (Sweden)

Spain	Portugal

GK	13	Sandra Paños
RB	3	Marta Torrejón (c)
CB	4	Irene Paredes
CB	5	Andrea Pereira
LB	21	Leila Ouahabi	(substituted off) 89'
RM	8	Amanda Sampedro
CM	15	Silvia Meseguer
LM	14	Victoria Losada
RF	22	Mariona Caldentey
CF	10	Jennifer Hermoso	(substituted off) 65'
LF	11	Alexia Putellas	(substituted off) 81'
Substitutions:
FW	9	Mari Paz Vilas	(substituted on) 65'
FW	19	Bárbara Latorre	(substituted on) 81'
DF	20	María Pilar León	(substituted on) 89'
Manager:
Jorge Vilda

GK	12	Patrícia Morais
RB	9	Ana Borges
CB	4	Sílvia Rebelo
CB	15	Carole Costa
LB	14	Dolores Silva
DM	11	Tatiana Pinto
RM	17	Vanessa Marques
LM	20	Suzane Pires	(substituted off) 71'
AM	7	Cláudia Neto (c)
CF	10	Ana Leite	(substituted off) 59'
CF	16	Diana Silva	(substituted off) 85'
Substitutions:
FW	18	Carolina Mendes	(substituted on) 59'
MF	23	Mélissa Antunes	(substituted on) 71'
FW	8	Laura Luís	(substituted on) 85'
Manager:
Francisco Neto

Player of the Match:
Amanda Sampedro (Spain)

Assistant referees:
Petruta Iugulescu (Romania)
Mihaela Gomoescu (Romania)
Fourth official:
Katalin Kulcsár (Hungary)

=== England vs Scotland ===
19 July 2017
20:45

England	6–0	Scotland
Taylor 11', 26', 53'; White 32'; Nobbs 87'; Duggan 90+3'	Report

Stadion Galgenwaard, Utrecht
Attendance: 5,578
Referee: Esther Staubli (Switzerland)

England	Scotland

GK	1	Karen Bardsley
RB	2	Lucy Bronze
CB	5	Steph Houghton (c)	(yellow card) 55'
CB	16	Millie Bright
LB	3	Demi Stokes
CM	11	Jade Moore
CM	4	Jill Scott	(yellow card) 62'
RW	7	Jordan Nobbs
AM	23	Fran Kirby		(substituted off) 65'
LW	18	Ellen White		(substituted off) 74'
CF	9	Jodie Taylor		(substituted off) 59'
Substitutions:
FW	19	Toni Duggan		(substituted on) 59'
FW	17	Nikita Parris		(substituted on) 65'
MF	14	Karen Carney		(substituted on) 74'
Manager:
(Wales) Mark Sampson

GK	1	Gemma Fay (c)
RB	17	Frankie Brown
CB	4	Ifeoma Dieke
CB	2	Vaila Barsley
LB	23	Chloe Arthur
DM	14	Rachel Corsie		(substituted off) 76'
RM	11	Lisa Evans
CM	10	Leanne Crichton
CM	9	Caroline Weir	(yellow card) 84'
LM	22	Fiona Brown		(substituted off) 46'
CF	13	Jane Ross		(substituted off) 63'
Substitutions:
MF	19	Lana Clelland		(substituted on) 46'
MF	8	Erin Cuthbert		(substituted on) 63'
MF	6	Joanne Love		(substituted on) 76'
Manager:
(Sweden) Anna Signeul

Player of the Match:
Jodie Taylor (England)

Assistant referees:
Belinda Brem (Switzerland)
Sanja Rodjak Karšić (Croatia)
Fourth official:
Jana Adámková (Czech Republic)

=== Scotland vs Portugal ===
23 July 2017
18:00

Scotland	1–2	Portugal
Cuthbert 68'	Report	C. Mendes 27'; Leite 72'

Sparta Stadion Het Kasteel, Rotterdam
Attendance: 3,123
Referee: Katalin Kulcsár (Hungary)

Scotland	Portugal

GK	1	Gemma Fay (c)
RB	18	Rachel McLauchlan		(substituted off) 82'
CB	4	Ifeoma Dieke
CB	2	Vaila Barsley
LB	20	Kirsty Smith
DM	14	Rachel Corsie	(yellow card) 75'
RM	11	Lisa Evans
CM	10	Leanne Crichton
CM	9	Caroline Weir
LM	22	Fiona Brown		(substituted off) 67'
CF	19	Lana Clelland		(substituted off) 54'
Substitutions:
MF	8	Erin Cuthbert		(substituted on) 54'
MF	7	Hayley Lauder		(substituted on) 67'
MF	6	Joanne Love		(substituted on) 82'
Manager:
(Sweden) Anna Signeul

GK	12	Patrícia Morais	(yellow card) 86'
RB	9	Ana Borges
CB	4	Sílvia Rebelo	(yellow card) 76'
CB	15	Carole Costa	(yellow card) 2'
LB	14	Dolores Silva		(substituted off) 90+2'
DM	11	Tatiana Pinto
RM	19	Amanda Da Costa		(substituted off) 76'
LM	17	Vanessa Marques
AM	7	Cláudia Neto (c)	(yellow card) 89'
CF	18	Carolina Mendes		(substituted off) 70'
CF	16	Diana Silva	(yellow card) 47'
Substitutions:
FW	10	Ana Leite		(substituted on) 70'
MF	20	Suzane Pires		(substituted on) 76'
FW	8	Laura Luís		(substituted on) 90+2'
Manager:
Francisco Neto

Player of the Match:
Dolores Silva (Portugal)

Assistant referees:
Judit Kulcsár (Hungary)
Nicolet Bakker (Netherlands)
Fourth official:
Lina Lehtovaara (Finland)

=== England vs Spain ===
23 July 2017
20:45

England	2–0	Spain
Kirby 2'; Taylor 85'	Report

Rat Verlegh Stadion, Breda
Attendance: 4,879
Referee: Carina Vitulano (Italy)

England	Spain

GK	1	Karen Bardsley
RB	2	Lucy Bronze
CB	5	Steph Houghton (c)
CB	16	Millie Bright
LB	3	Demi Stokes
CM	11	Jade Moore
CM	4	Jill Scott
RW	7	Jordan Nobbs
AM	23	Fran Kirby	(substituted off) 69'
LW	18	Ellen White	(substituted off) 79'
CF	9	Jodie Taylor	(substituted off) 89'
Substitutions:
MF	8	Isobel Christiansen	(substituted on) 69'
FW	19	Toni Duggan	(substituted on) 79'
DF	6	Jo Potter	(substituted on) 89'
Manager:
(Wales) Mark Sampson

GK	13	Sandra Paños
CB	3	Marta Torrejón (c)
CB	5	Andrea Pereira	(yellow card) 69'
CB	4	Irene Paredes	(yellow card) 31'
RWB	7	Marta Corredera
DM	15	Silvia Meseguer
LWB	21	Leila Ouahabi		(substituted off) 89'
CM	14	Victoria Losada		(substituted off) 73'
CM	11	Alexia Putellas
SS	8	Amanda Sampedro		(substituted off) 89'
CF	10	Jennifer Hermoso
Substitutions:
FW	17	Olga García		(substituted on) 73'
FW	19	Bárbara Latorre		(substituted on) 89'
MF	6	Virginia Torrecilla		(substituted on) 89'
Manager:
Jorge Vilda

Player of the Match:
Lucy Bronze (England)

Assistant referees:
Lucia Abruzzese (Italy)
Chrysoula Kourompylia (Greece)
Fourth official:
Monika Mularczyk (Poland)

=== Portugal vs England ===
27 July 2017
20:45

Portugal	1–2	England
C. Mendes 17'	Report	Duggan 7'; Parris 48'

Koning Willem II Stadion, Tilburg
Attendance: 3,335
Referee: Kateryna Monzul (Ukraine)

Portugal	England

GK	12	Patrícia Morais
RB	9	Ana Borges
CB	4	Sílvia Rebelo
CB	15	Carole Costa
LB	14	Dolores Silva
DM	11	Tatiana Pinto
CM	23	Mélissa Antunes
CM	20	Suzane Pires	(substituted off) 79'
AM	7	Cláudia Neto (c)
CF	18	Carolina Mendes	(substituted off) 64'
CF	16	Diana Silva	(substituted off) 87'
Substitutions:
FW	10	Ana Leite	(substituted on) 64'
MF	19	Amanda Da Costa	(substituted on) 79'
FW	8	Laura Luís	(substituted on) 87'
Manager:
Francisco Neto

GK	13	Siobhan Chamberlain
RB	22	Alex Scott
CB	15	Laura Bassett (c)
CB	16	Millie Bright		(substituted off) 60'
LB	20	Alex Greenwood
CM	10	Fara Williams	(yellow card) 5'
CM	6	Jo Potter
RW	14	Karen Carney
AM	19	Toni Duggan		(substituted off) 81'
LW	8	Isobel Christiansen	(yellow card) 27'
CF	17	Nikita Parris
Substitutions:
MF	7	Jordan Nobbs		(substituted on) 60'
DF	3	Demi Stokes		(substituted on) 81'
Manager:
(Wales) Mark Sampson

Player of the Match:
Toni Duggan (England)

Assistant referees:
Maryna Striletska (Ukraine)
Oleksandra Ardasheva (Ukraine)
Fourth official:
Esther Staubli (Switzerland)

=== Scotland vs Spain ===
27 July 2017
20:45

Scotland	1–0	Spain
Weir 42'	Report

De Adelaarshorst, Deventer
Attendance: 4,840
Referee: Jana Adámková (Czech Republic)

Scotland	Spain

GK	1	Gemma Fay (c)	(yellow card) 40'
RB	17	Frankie Brown	(yellow card) 44'
CB	4	Ifeoma Dieke
CB	14	Rachel Corsie
LB	23	Chloe Arthur
DM	10	Leanne Crichton
RM	11	Lisa Evans
CM	6	Joanne Love		(substituted off) 73'
CM	9	Caroline Weir
LM	8	Erin Cuthbert
CF	5	Leanne Ross		(substituted off) 46'
Substitutions:
MF	19	Lana Clelland		(substituted on) 46'
FW	22	Fiona Brown		(substituted on) 73'
Manager:
(Sweden) Anna Signeul

GK	13	Sandra Paños
RB	3	Marta Torrejón (c)
CB	5	Andrea Pereira
CB	4	Irene Paredes
LB	21	Leila Ouahabi	(yellow card) 54'	(substituted off) 56'
RM	8	Amanda Sampedro
CM	15	Silvia Meseguer
LM	14	Victoria Losada
RF	22	Mariona Caldentey		(substituted off) 79'
CF	10	Jennifer Hermoso		(substituted off) 46'
LF	11	Alexia Putellas
Substitutions:
FW	9	Mari Paz Vilas		(substituted on) 46'
MF	7	Marta Corredera		(substituted on) 56'
FW	19	Bárbara Latorre		(substituted on) 79'
Manager:
Jorge Vilda

Player of the Match:
Caroline Weir (Scotland)

Assistant referees:
Lucie Ratajová (Czech Republic)
Maria Sukenikova (Slovakia)
Fourth official:
Lina Lehtovaara (Finland)
