= Einarsdóttir =

Einarsdóttir is a surname. Notable people with the surname include:

- Bryndís Einarsdóttir (born 1958), Icelandic footballer
- Freydís Halla Einarsdóttir (born 1994), Icelandic alpine ski racer
- Hildigunnur Einarsdóttir (born 1988), Icelandic handball player
- Hildur Vala Einarsdóttir (born 1982), Icelandic singer
- Jóhanna Einarsdóttir (born 1952), Icelandic professor
- Ólafía Einarsdóttir (1924–2017), Icelandic archaeologist
- Sunneva Einarsdóttir (born 1990), Icelandic handball player
- Svandís Dóra Einarsdóttir (born 1984), Icelandic actress
- Thelma Björk Einarsdóttir (born 1990), Icelandic footballer
