= Andrea Rodrigues =

Andrea Rodrigues may refer to:

- Andrea Rodrigues (footballer) (born 1990), American footballer
- Andrea Rodrigues (judoka) (born 1973), Brazilian judoka
