= UEFA Women's Euro 2013 qualifying Group 7 =

Football tournament qualification stage

The UEFA Women's Euro 2013 qualifying – Group 7 was contested by five teams competing for one spot for the final tournament.

== Standings ==
| Team qualified for UEFA Women's Euro 2013 |
| Team competes in Play-off round |

| Team | Pld | W | D | L | GF | GA | GD | Pts |
|---|---|---|---|---|---|---|---|---|
| Denmark | 8 | 7 | 0 | 1 | 28 | 3 | +25 | 21 |
| Austria | 8 | 6 | 1 | 1 | 16 | 9 | +7 | 19 |
| Czech Republic | 8 | 4 | 1 | 3 | 16 | 9 | +7 | 13 |
| Portugal | 8 | 2 | 0 | 6 | 16 | 13 | +3 | 6 |
| Armenia | 8 | 0 | 0 | 8 | 2 | 44 | −42 | 0 |

Source: UEFA.com

== Fixtures ==
All times are UTC+2.

17 September 2011
14:00

| Armenia | 0–8 | Portugal |
|---|---|---|
| | Report | Mendes 2'; Rodrigues 7', 59'; Fernandes 45+2', 53'; Brandão 63'; Couto 70' (pen.); Luis 84' |

Mika Stadium, Yerevan
Attendance: 500
Referee: Esther Azzopardi (Malta)
17 September 2011
17:00

| Austria | 1–1 | Czech Republic |
|---|---|---|
| Hanschitz 60' | Report | Mocová 55' |

Voralpenstadion, Vöcklabruck
Attendance: 700
Referee: Cristina Dorcioman (Romania)

21 September 2011
14:00

| Armenia | 0–5 | Denmark |
|---|---|---|
| | Report | Kr. Pedersen 4'; Troelsgaard 29'; Harder 49'; Jensen 72'; Nielsen 90+3' |

Mika Stadium, Yerevan
Attendance: 302
Referee: Lilach Asulin (Israel)

22 October 2011
15:00

| Czech Republic | 1–0 | Portugal |
|---|---|---|
| Divišová 65' | Report |

Městský sportovní areál, Písek
Attendance: 520
Referee: Sofia Karagiorgi (Cyprus)
22 October 2011
19:30

| Denmark | 3–0 | Austria |
|---|---|---|
| Harder 32', 41', 90+2' | Report |

Vejle Stadion, Vejle
Attendance: 1,695
Referee: Efthalia Mitsi (Greece)

26 October 2011
15:30

| Austria | 3–0 | Armenia |
|---|---|---|
| Feiersinger 17'; Tasch 40'; Gstöttner 70' | Report |

Murinselstadion, Bruck an der Mur
Attendance: 614
Referee: Monika Mularczyk (Poland)
26 October 2011
16:00

| Portugal | 0–3 | Denmark |
|---|---|---|
| | Report | Christiansen 13'; Petersen 77'; Nielsen 87' |

Estádio Cidade de Barcelos, Barcelos
Attendance: 612
Referee: Esther Staubli (Switzerland)

19 November 2011
19:00

| Portugal | 0–1 | Austria |
|---|---|---|
| | Report | Feiersinger 13' |

Estádio Municipal de Pombal, Pombal
Attendance: 1,000
Referee: Linn Andersson (Sweden)

20 November 2011
13:30

| Czech Republic | 5–0 | Armenia |
|---|---|---|
| I. Martínková 3'; Sedláčková 6'; L. Martínková 11'; Hoferková 70'; Pivoňková 90+1' (pen.) | Report |

Stadion Pod Lipou, Roudnice nad Labem
Attendance: 342
Referee: Eleni Lampadariou (Greece)

23 November 2011
18:15

| Denmark | 11–0 | Armenia |
|---|---|---|
| Troelsgaard 3', 24', 53'; Røddik 28', 86'; Harder 36', 44', 88'; Christiansen 42'; Pedersen 58'; Bukh 90+2' | Report |

Vejle Stadion, Vejle
Attendance: 1,813
Referee: Anja Kunick (Germany)

15 February 2012
16:00

| Portugal | 6–0 | Armenia |
|---|---|---|
| Luis 30'; Costa 35'; Neto 46'; Rodrigues 58'; Antunes 62'; Matias 67' | Report |

Estádio Municipal do Cartaxo, Cartaxo
Attendance: 800
Referee: Marija Margareta Damjanović (Croatia)

31 March 2012
17:00

| Portugal | 2–5 | Czech Republic |
|---|---|---|
| Rodrigues 20'; Mendes 71' | Report | I. Martínková 13', 27', 36' (pen.); Divišová 45'; Pivoňková 53' |

Estádio João Cardoso, Tondela
Attendance: 620
Referee: Floarea Ionescu (Romania)

1 April 2012
13:00

| Armenia | 2–4 | Austria |
|---|---|---|
| Armenyan 7'; Ghukasyan 10' | Report | Burger 21', 35', 59'; Haas 27' |

Mika Stadium, Yerevan
Attendance: 120
Referee: Aneliya Sinabova (Bulgaria)

4 April 2012
15:30

| Czech Republic | 0–2 | Denmark |
|---|---|---|
| | Report | Veje 35'; Harder 53' |

FK Viktoria Stadion, Prague
Attendance: 886
Referee: Kateryna Monzul (Ukraine)

5 April 2012
19:00

| Austria | 1–0 | Portugal |
|---|---|---|
| Feiersinger 85' | Report |

Stadion Wiener Neustadt, Wiener Neustadt
Attendance: 3,115
Referee: Natalia Aleksakhina (Ukraine)

16 June 2012
16:00

| Czech Republic | 2–3 | Austria |
|---|---|---|
| Martínková 45+3'; Divišová 86' | Report | Puntigam 40' (pen.); Prohaska 45+5'; Burger 63' |

FK Viktoria Stadion, Prague
Attendance: 400
Referee: Christina W. Pedersen (Norway)

20 June 2012
19:30

| Denmark | 1–0 | Czech Republic |
|---|---|---|
| Nadim 55' | Report |

Vejle Stadion, Vejle
Attendance: 2,016
Referee: Silvia Tea Spinelli (Italy)

15 September 2012
18:00

| Austria | 3–1 | Denmark |
|---|---|---|
| Aschauer 42'; Burger 47', 79' | Report | Nadim 90+2' |

NV Arena, Sankt Pölten
Attendance: 2,600
Referee: Saša Ihringová (England)

19 September 2012
14:00

| Armenia | 0–2 | Czech Republic |
|---|---|---|
| | Report | Ringelová 13'; Danihelková 66' |

Republican Stadium, Yerevan
Attendance: 275
Referee: Sjoukje de Jong (Netherlands)
19 September 2012
18:00

| Denmark | 2–0 | Portugal |
|---|---|---|
| Harder 65'; Røddik 81' (pen.) | Report |

Vejle Stadion, Vejle
Attendance: 2,521
Referee: Gyöngyi Gaál (Hungary)

== Goalscorers ==
9 goals

- (Denmark) Pernille Harder

6 goals

- (Austria) Nina Burger

5 goals

- (Czech Republic) Irena Martínková

4 goals

- (Denmark) Sanne Troelsgaard
- (Portugal) Andrea Rodrigues

3 goals

- (Austria) Laura Feiersinger
- (Czech Republic) Petra Divišová
- (Denmark) Line Røddik

2 goals

- (Czech Republic) Adéla Pivoňková
- (Czech Republic) Markéta Ringelová
- (Denmark) Nanna Christiansen
- (Denmark) Nadia Nadim
- (Denmark) Theresa Nielsen
- (Denmark) Kristine Pedersen
- (Portugal) Edite Fernandes
- (Portugal) Carolina Mendes
- (Portugal) Laura Luis

1 goal

- (Armenia) Gohar Armenyan
- (Armenia) Ani Ghukasyan
- (Austria) Verena Aschauer
- (Austria) Maria Gstöttner
- (Austria) Cornelia Haas
- (Austria) Marlies Hanschitz
- (Austria) Nadine Prohaska
- (Austria) Sarah Puntigam
- (Austria) Daniela Tasch
- (Czech Republic) Nikola Danihelková
- (Czech Republic) Veronika Hoferková
- (Czech Republic) Lucie Martínková
- (Czech Republic) Iva Mocová
- (Czech Republic) Jana Sedláčková
- (Denmark) Julie Rydahl Bukh
- (Denmark) Line Jensen
- (Denmark) Katrine Pedersen
- (Denmark) Katrine Veje
- (Portugal) Melissa Antunes
- (Portugal) Kimberly Brandão
- (Portugal) Carole Costa
- (Portugal) Carla Couto
- (Portugal) Sónia Matias
- (Portugal) Cláudia Neto
