= Adriana Rodrigues =

Portuguese footballer (born 1992)

Personal information
- Date of birth: 9 May 1992 (age 34)
- Place of birth: St. Petersburg, Florida, United States
- Height: 1.62 m (5 ft 4 in)
- Position: Midfielder

Team information
- Current team: FC Neunkirch
- Number: 8

Youth career
- 1999: Clearwater Chargers
- 2000: Strictly Soccer Club
- 2001: Clearwater Chargers
- 2002: Countryside Lightning
- 2003–2009: Clearwater Chargers
- 2006–2009: St. Petersburg Devils

College career
Years	Team	Apps	(Gls)
2010	Florida Gators		
2011–2013	Jacksonville Dolphins		

Senior career*
Years	Team	Apps	(Gls)
2014–2016	FC Neunkirch	34	(1)
2016–2017	SC Braga	15	(0)
2017–	Győri ETO FC	8	(0)

International career^{‡}
2008	Brazil U17		
2011	Portugal U19	5	(0)
2011– 2014	Portugal	6	(0)
- * Club domestic league appearances and goals as of 16:37, 31 August 2015 (UTC) ‡ National team caps and goals as of 16:37, 31 August 2015 (UTC)

Adriana Rodrigues Orem (born 9 May 1992) is a Portuguese soccer player.

== Life ==
=== Early life ===
Rodrigues was born in Florida to a Portuguese father and Brazilian mother. Adriana's sister Andrea Rodrigues is also a Portuguese international soccer player.

=== Career ===
==== National ====
Rodrigues started her career for Clearwater Chargers, played later than with Strictly Soccer Club, Countryside Lightning and another eight years for Clearwater. She played besides four year from 2005 until 2009, for St. Petersburg Devils the St. Petersburg High School. 2010 went for Studies to Florida who played for the Florida Gators and later 3 years for Jacksonville Dolphins. Shortly after graduating from Jacksonville University in December 2013 with a degree in communications, Rodrigues agreed a contract with FC Neunkirch of the Swiss Nationalliga A. After two and a half year left Swiss side Neunkirch and signed in the Homeland of her father Portugal by Sporting Clube de Braga. After one year who played 15 games for SC Braga in the joined to Hungary top-tier club Győri ETO FC.

==== International ====
She played for Brazil in the 2008 South American Under-17 Women's Football Championship, but switched her allegiance to Portugal and made her senior national team debut on 17 September 2011 against Armenia women's national football team, in 8:0 win.
