= Recreation Park, Alloa =

Football stadium in Alloa, Clackmannanshire, Scotland

Recreation Park
- Recreation Park
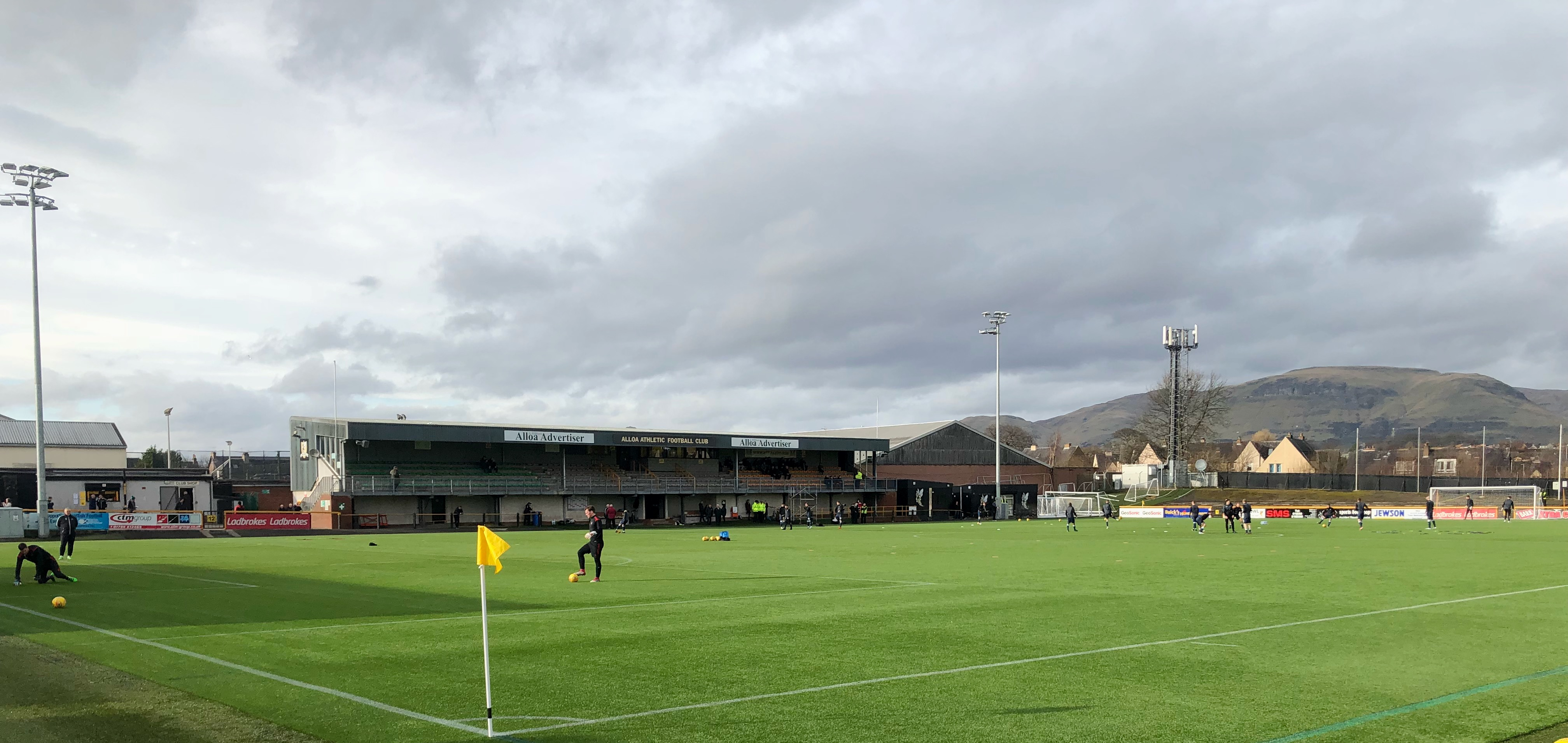

- Location within Clackmannanshire
- Location: Alloa, Scotland
- Coordinates: 56°07′0″N 3°46′43″W
- Owner: Alloa Athletic
- Operator: Alloa Athletic
- Capacity: 3,100 (919 seated)
- Surface: Artificial Turf

Construction
- Opened: 1895

Tenants
- Alloa Athletic (1895–); Broomhill (2016–2022); Central Girls (2017–)

Recreation Park, also known as Recreation Grounds, "The Recs" and The Indodrill Stadium for sponsorship reasons, is a football stadium in Alloa, Clackmannanshire, Scotland. It is the home ground of Scottish Professional Football League team Alloa Athletic, who have played there since 1895. Additionally, Broomhill (formerly BSC Glasgow) of the Scottish Lowland Football League groundshared at Recreation Park from 2016–2022. From 2025 Stirling University's 2nd team who play in the EoSFL will groundshare going forward. Central Girls Football Academy have used the stadium for home matches from 2017. The stadium has an artificial playing surface and a capacity of 3,100.

== History ==
Alloa Athletic have played at Recreation Park since 1895. A wooden main stand was built during the 1920s. Around 1950, a terracing cover was built on the Hilton Road Side. A record attendance of 15,467 was set by a 1954–55 Scottish Cup match against Celtic. Floodlights were installed in 1979. A new main stand was opened in 1991. The new main stand cost £350,000, most of which was provided by the Football Trust. By the mid-1990s, when the ground was being used for Rangers reserve team matches, capacity had been restricted to just over 4,000.

An artificial surface was installed at the ground before the 2007–08 season. A seated stand was constructed on the Hilton Road Side in 2008. Clyde played matches at Recreation Park early in the 2012–13 season, while a synthetic surface was being installed at Broadwood Stadium.

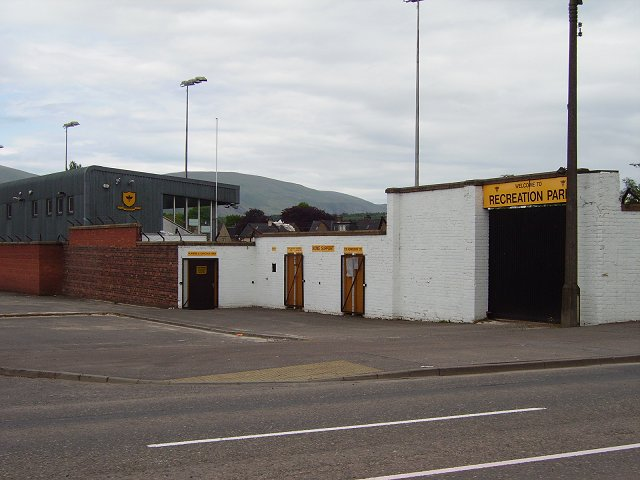
The stadium's turnstiles in 2006

On 12 September 2014, a six-figure sponsorship deal was struck that saw the stadium renamed as The Indodrill Stadium. However, supporters of the club continue to call it Recreation Park, Recreation Grounds or "The Recs". In June 2016, it was announced that from the 2016–17 season, Alloa would ground share with Lowland Football League side BSC Glasgow, while the latter continued to work towards their goal of having their own facility.

== Structure and facilities ==
Recreation Park has two seated stands, one on each side, totalling 919 seats. The main stand, which has just over 400 seats, runs approximately half the length of the pitch and is raised above ground level. The other stand, on the Hilton Road Side, is used by away team supporters. The rest of the ground is open terracing, apart from a small cover at the Clackmannan Road End. The Ochil Hills are clearly visible behind the Railway End of the ground. Since 2007, an artificial pitch has been used at Recreation Park. The 3G surface was replaced in 2016 with upgraded MX TriMension technology. Between July and early August 2025 the pitch will be relaid with a Vertex Core Prime surface meeting FIFA Quality Pro criteria.

== Transport ==
Alloa railway station, which is within walking distance of Recreation Park, reopened in May 2008. It is served by trains on the Croy Line from Glasgow Queen Street and Stirling. Recreation Park is situated on the A907 road (Clackmannan Road), which runs between Stirling and Dunfermline. Street parking is available in the surrounding area.
