= Naja Bahrenscheer =

Danish footballer (born 1996)

Personal information
- Full name: Naja Stolberg Bahrenscheer
- Date of birth: 3 September 1996 (age 30)
- Place of birth: Helsingør, Denmark
- Height: 1.69 m (5 ft 7 in)
- Position: Goalkeeper

Team information
- Current team: Brøndby IF
- Number: 20

Youth career
- 2007-2018: BSF

Senior career*
Years	Team	Apps	(Gls)
2018-2019	Ballerup-Skovlunde Fodbold		
2018-2019	LB07 Malmö		
2017-2020	BSF	45	(0)
2020-	Brøndby IF	15	(0)

International career^{‡}
2012	Denmark U16	4	(0)
2012-2013	Denmark U17	10	(0)
2013-2015	Denmark U19	22	(0)
2015-2018	Denmark U23	2	(0)
2018-	Denmark	2	(0)
- * Club domestic league appearances and goals as of 10 June 2020 ‡ National team caps and goals as of 10 June 2020

Naja Bahrenscheer (born 3 September 1996) is a Danish footballer who plays as a goalkeeper for Brøndby IF in the Elitedivisionen and has appeared for the Denmark women's national team. She has also played for the Danish youth teams several times.

== Club career ==
She started playing for Ballerup-Skovlunde Fodbold in her youth years. In 2018, she moved up to the first team, but she signed with LB07 Malmö in some months after. She went back to Ballerup-Skovlunde Fodbold in Spring 2019. After being first choice-goalkeeper in the club, she moved to the rivals from Brøndby IF.
