= Andrea Rodrigues (footballer) =

Portuguese footballer (born 1990)

Personal information
- Full name: Andrea Christine Rodrigues Orem
- Date of birth: 6 January 1990 (age 36)
- Place of birth: St. Petersburg, Florida, U.S.
- Height: 1.68 m (5 ft 6 in)
- Positions: Defender; midfielder

Youth career
- Clearwater Chargers
- Tampa Bay Club Sport
- 2003–2007: St. Petersburg Devils

College career
Years	Team	Apps	(Gls)
2008–2012	UCF Knights		

Senior career*
Years	Team	Apps	(Gls)
2013–2014	Tampa Bay Hellenic		

International career
2010	Brazil U20		
2010–2014	Portugal	13	(5)
- * Club domestic league appearances and goals

Andrea Christine Rodrigues Orem (born January 6, 1990) is an American-born Portuguese football player.

== Biography ==
Rodrigues was born in St. Petersburg, Florida, the daughter of a Portuguese father and a Brazilian mother. Andrea's sister Adriana Rodrigues is also a Portuguese international soccer player. After retiring, she became a Client Services Manager with the Orlando Magic.

== Career ==
The midfielder that used play for UCF Knights in the NCAA and a year in the Women's Premier Soccer League for Tampa Bay Hellenic.

=== International ===
She played the Portuguese national team. She made her international debut at 20 in June 2010 in a 1–0 win over Slovenia.

With one match remaining she was Portugal's top scorer in the 2013 Euro qualifying with four goals.
