= Line Geltzer Johansen =

Danish footballer (born 1989)

Personal information
- Full name: Line Geltzer Johansen
- Date of birth: 26 July 1989 (age 37)
- Place of birth: Aalborg, Denmark
- Height: 1.78 m (5 ft 10 in)
- Position: Goalkeeper

Youth career
- AaB

Senior career*
Years	Team	Apps	(Gls)
2010	B52/Aalborg Fodbold Club		
2011	Watford		
2011–2013	AaB		
2013	Box Hill United SC		
2014	Fortuna Hjørring		
2014	Team Viborg		
2014	University of Queensland FC		
2015	Grimstad Amazon FK	22	(0)
2016	Vålerenga		
2017	Vejle B		
2017–2018	Kopparbergs/Göteborg FC	11	(0)
2018–2019	Avaldsnes IL	16	(0)
2019–2020	Logroño	16	(0)
2021–2022	Fortuna Hjørring	18	(0)

International career
2016–2019	Denmark	5	(0)
Medal record
Women's football
Representing Denmark
UEFA Women's Championship
Silver medal – second place	2017 Netherlands	Team
- * Club domestic league appearances and goals

Line Geltzer Johansen (born 26 July 1989) is a Danish football agent and former player who played as a goalkeeper for the Denmark national team.

== Club career ==
Line grew up in Aalborg, Denmark and featured for her hometown club AaB throughout her youth career, except from a short stint to B52/Aalborg FC. As part of her studies at university, Line went to London for a semester where she played for Watford Ladies FC in the Women's Premier League. Upon her return to Denmark, she made a move to Fortuna Hjørring but soon left the club and returned to AaB in search for more game time at senior level.

Master studies then opened an internship opportunity in Melbourne and Line made the move down under and joined Box Hill United SC in the Victorian Women's Premier League. It earned her a starting spot with the FFV WPL All Stars team and a train-on spot with Melbourne Victory in the W-League. An offer from the University of Queensland FC in the South East Queensland Women's Premier League saw her make the move to Brisbane where she had a successful season with the team. She returned to Denmark and joined Team Viborg in the Danish Elitedivisionen. In January 2015, she received her first offer of a full-time professional contract with Amazon Grimstad FK in Norwegian Toppserien. She played the full season at the club and spent her second pro year with Vålerenga IF in Norwegian Toppserien.

With the ambition of making it into the Danish Euro squad, she made a move home to Vejle Boldklub and amateur football for the spring of 2017. The gamble paid off in a spot as the third-choice goalkeeper with the Danish Euro team in July 2017 and later earned her the professional contract with Kopparbergs/Göteborg FC in Swedish Damallsvenskan from August 2017.

== International career ==
Line has been involved with the national team since early 2015. She made her first international appearance for the Danish National Team on 28 January 2016 in a friendly against Netherlands. Line was capped three times and was part of the Danish squad that finished second in the UEFA European Championship 2017.
