= Hanne Gråhns =

Swedish footballer

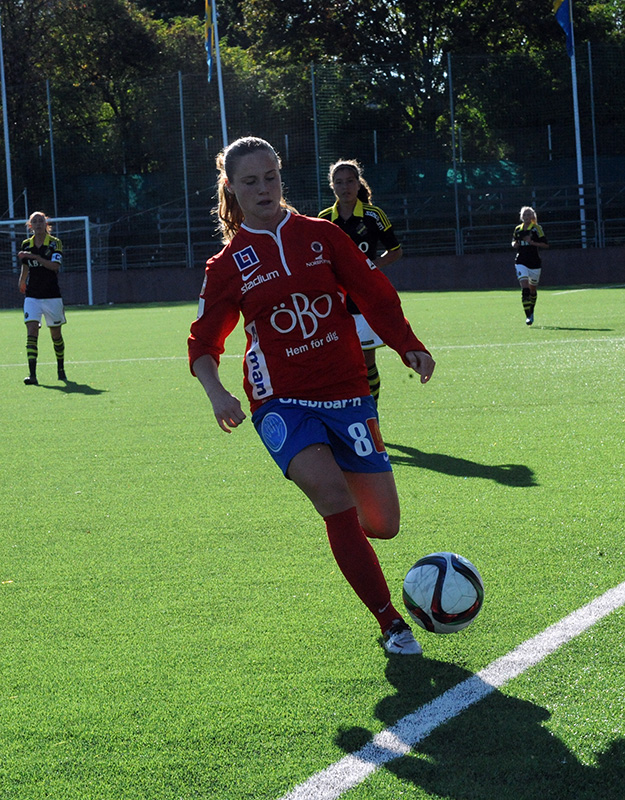
- Gråhns in 2015

Personal information
- Full name: Hanne Gråhns
- Date of birth: 29 August 1992 (age 34)
- Place of birth: Hedemora, Sweden
- Height: 1.67 m (5 ft 6 in)
- Position: Midfielder

Senior career*
Years	Team	Apps	(Gls)
2011	IFK Norrköping	10	(4)
2011	Linköpings FC	9	(0)
2011	→ IFK Norrköping	3	(4)
2012	Norrkoping	16	(8)
2013–2014	Kvarnsveden	51	(7)
2015–2018	KIF Orebro	73	(2)

International career
2016–2017	Sweden	4	(0)
- * Club domestic league appearances and goals as of 10:11, 8 December 2018 (UTC)

Hanne Gråhns (born 29 August 1992) is a Swedish former football midfielder who played for KIF Örebro DFF.

At the 2016 Summer Olympics Gråhns was an alternate for the Sweden national team, who came second in the tournament.

When Örebro suffered a shock relegation from the Damallsvenskan in 2017, Gråhns remained loyal to the club. She retired from football after captaining the team to promotion in 2018.

== Honours ==
Sweden U19

Winner

- UEFA Women's Under-19 Championship: 2012
