= Joe McGurn =

Scottish footballer (1965–2017)

Personal information
- Full name: Joseph McGurn
- Date of birth: 2 January 1965
- Place of birth: Hamilton, Scotland
- Date of death: 2017 (aged 52)
- Position(s): Forward

Senior career*
Years	Team	Apps	(Gls)
1984–1988	St Johnstone	63	(7)
1988–1989	Alloa Athletic	5	(0)
1989–1991	Stenhousemuir	11	(4)
- East Kilbride Thistle
- *Club domestic league appearances and goals

Joseph McGurn (2 January 1965 – 2017) was a Scottish footballer who played as a forward.

McGurn played the bulk of his senior career with St Johnstone making 63 appearances for the Perth club. He then had short spells with Alloa Athletic and Stenhousemuir before moving to the juniors with East Kilbride Thistle.

McGurn died on 15 August 2017 at the age of 52 having fought cancer.
