= Laura Luís =

Portuguese footballer

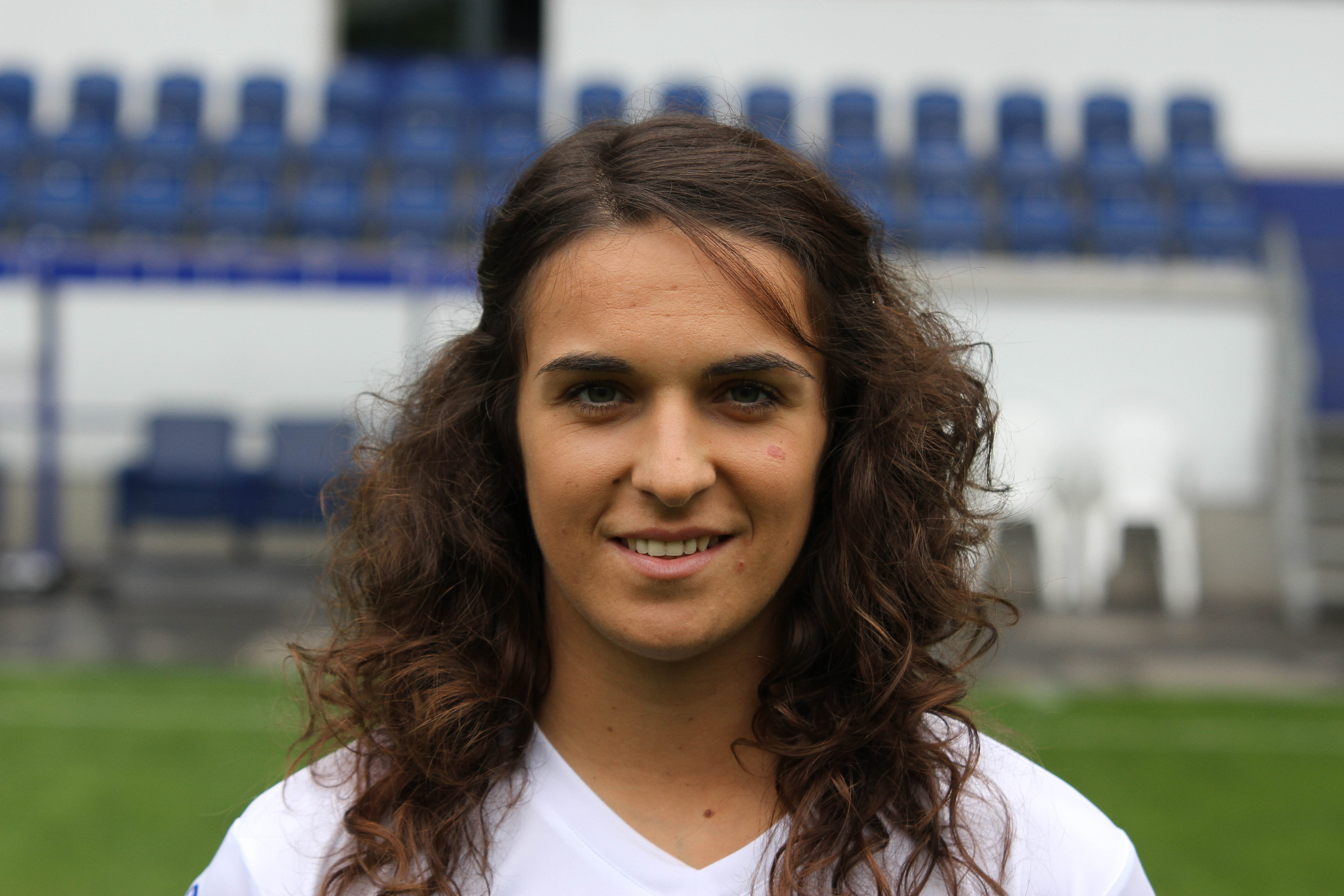
- Luís in 2014

Personal information
- Full name: Laura José Ramos Luís
- Date of birth: 15 August 1992 (age 34)
- Place of birth: Funchal, Madeira, Portugal
- Height: 1.60 m (5 ft 3 in)
- Position: Forward

Team information
- Current team: SC Braga
- Number: 8

Youth career
- G.D. Apel

College career
Years	Team	Apps	(Gls)
2011	UTB/TSC Ocelots	12	(14)

Senior career*
Years	Team	Apps	(Gls)
2008–2010	Marítimo		
2010–2011	Desportivo Madeira		
2012	Santa Clarita Blue Heat		
2012–2013	Marítimo		
2013	FCR 2001 Duisburg	3	(1)
2013–2016	MSV Duisburg	18	(6)
2016–2017	FF USV Jena	14	(1)
2017–	SC Braga	95	(59)

International career^{‡}
2008–2011	Portugal U19	17	(7)
2011–	Portugal	53	(8)
- * Club domestic league appearances and goals as of 17 Feb 2023 ‡ National team caps and goals as of 17 Feb 2023

Laura José Ramos Luís (born 15 August 1992) is a Portuguese football forward who plays for Campeonato Nacional de Futebol Feminino club SC Braga and the Portugal women's national football team.

== Club career ==
In May 2017, Luís ended a four-year spell in German football by signing for SC Braga. By March 2018 Luís had already scored 20 goals when she agreed an extension to her contract with Braga. In April her acrobatic bicycle kick goal against Boavista went viral and was compared to a celebrated goal which fellow Madeiran Cristiano Ronaldo had recently scored against Juventus. She finished as the top goalscorer of the 2017–18 Campeonato Nacional de Futebol Feminino, with 32 goals.

== International career ==
Luís scored on her senior debut for the Portugal women's national football team on 17 September 2011, an 8–0 UEFA Women's Euro 2013 qualifying win over Armenia.

She was named by coach Francisco Neto in the 23-player Portugal squad for UEFA Women's Euro 2017 in the Netherlands.
