= Central Girls Football Academy =

Central Girls
- Imagine, Believe, Achieve
- Full name: Central Girls Football Academy
- Nicknames: Central, The Cyan
- Founded: 2014; 12 years ago
- Ground: Indodrill Stadium, Alloa
- Capacity: 3,100
- Head coach: Ian Dibdin
- League: SWPL 2
- 2017: SWFL 1 North, Champions
- Website: http://www.centralfootballacademy.com
Home colours	Away colours

Central Girls Football Academy is a women's football team based in Grangemouth, Central Scotland.

From 2018, they have been members of the Scottish Women's Premier League (SWPL), the highest level women's football league in Scotland. They currently compete in its second tier, SWPL2, having won the third-tier Scottish Women's Football League Division 1 North in 2017. The club's motto is "Imagine, Believe, Achieve".

Central also have a team that play in the fourth tier of Scottish women's football in the SWFL2 Central league. The SWFL team play their home games at Inchyra Park, Grangemouth.

== History ==
=== Foundation ===
The club was founded by football coach Ian Dibdin. In the early 2000s, whilst working within youth development at Falkirk Football Club under Ian McCall, Dibdin was invited to work on expanding the Falkirk girls section. Under this initiative, Dibdin designed and set up women's programs for Falkirk and Stenhousemuir football clubs. In January 2014, Dibdin founded Central Girls Football Academy.

=== 2015–2017 ===
In 2015 the team won the SWFL Division 2 Central and were promoted to the SWFL Division 1 North.

On 5 November 2017, Central beat Inverness 6–0 to win the SWFL North league and gain promotion to the SWPL2 for the 2018 season. Central won 17 of their 18 league games, scoring 102 goals and conceding only 18 during the campaign.

=== 2018 (SWPL 2) ===
During the 2018 SWPL launch, captain Ellie Kane intimated Central intended to challenge for that years SWPL2 title. On 11 February, Central began the campaign with a 3–1 win away to St Johnstone.

In April 2018, Central midfielder, Chelsea McEachran won the first SWPL Player of the Month award of 2018 for February/March at only 15 years of age.

In July 2018, Central captain Ellie Kane and midfielder Kim McAlpine left the club to take up university scholarships in the United States. Both spoke highly of Central coach Ian Dibdin with McAlpine stating she hoped to return to Central after her four-year scholarship to Carson–Newman University, Tennessee. Kane left for University of South Alabama, also on a four-year scholarship.

== Youth and development ==
The club has had considerable success at youth level, winning many titles.

In 2014 the Central Under-14 team won the UK Championships. In 2015, the Central Under-15 team won the Scottish Cup when they beat Glasgow City 5–0. In 2016 the team won UK Championships again at Under-16 and Under-17 level.

Eight players of the 2017 SWFL winning team played in and won the Under-14 UK Championship in July 2014.

In July 2018 Central won the Under-15 UK Championship. The win gave Central a UK Championship haul with titles at U14, U15, U16 & U17 level. Later in the same month, the under-15 team also won the Home International Coalfields Cup held in Kelty, Fife. The team beat Boroughmuir Thistle 3–1 in the final, on 30 July 2018.

== Matchday programme ==
The Central Girls Football Academy SWPL Match Day programme is called View from the Centre. Each edition contains match reports, player profiles, league updates and opposition news.

== Current squad ==
Note: Flags indicate national team as defined under FIFA eligibility rules; some limited exceptions apply. Players may hold more than one non-FIFA nationality.

No.	Pos.	Nation	Player
1	GK	SCO	Sarah King
2	DF	SCO	Zoe Young
3	DF	SCO	Sophie Mauriello
5	DF	SCO	Shaney McCabe
18	DF	SCO	Emma McMurdo
4	MF	SCO	Megan Gallagher
6	MF	SCO	Kim McAlpine

No.	Pos.	Nation	Player
7	MF	SCO	Ellie Kane (captain)
10	MF	SCO	Chelsea McEachran
11	MF	SCO	Monica Anderson
8	FW	SCO	Abby Callaghan
9	FW	SCO	Morgan Cross
15	FW	SCO	Naomi Welch
16	FW	SCO	Jade Lockie

== Personnel ==
Club manager:	Ian Dibdin
Senior Team Coach:	Adam Young
Senior Team Coaching Staff:	Ian Dibdin / Kenny McAlpine / Adam Young (Jnr)
SWFL Team Coach:	Darren Dibdin
SWFL Team Coaching Staff:	Ian Dibdin / Mark Lenathen
Goalkeeping coach:	Davie King
Secretary:	Mark Lenathen
Club Sponsor:	Fitzsimons Chartered Accountants
Kit Manufacturer:	Uhlsport / Adidas
Senior Team Sponsor:	Baberton Solutions
SWFL Team Sponsor:	MSL (Scotland) Ltd

== Honours ==
Central Girls F.A. honours
Honour	No.	Years
SWFL Division 2 Central	1	2015
SWFL Division 1 North	2	2017
