= 2017 Scottish Women's Football League First Division =

SWFL 1
- Season: 2017
- All statistics correct as of 4 November 2016.

The 2017 Scottish Women's Football League First Division, commonly known as SWFL 1, is the second season of the Scottish Women's Football League First Division, the third tier of women's football in Scotland since its reconstruction at the end of the 2015 season.

The leagues are split into two regional divisions of 12 teams each, North and South. The change was made to increase competitiveness in the league.

Central Girls won the North division and Kilmarnock won the South division. Both were promoted to SWPL 2 for the 2018 season.

== SWFL 1 North ==
=== Teams ===
Locations of teams in the 2017 SWFL 1 North

Team	Location	Home ground	Capacity	2016 position	source
Aberdeen Reserves	Aberdeen	Balgownie Playing Fields	1,000		
Central Girls	Grangemouth	Inchyra Park, Grangemouth	1,000		
Dee Ladies	Portlethen	Nicol Park	1,000	6th	
Westdyke Dee Vale	Aberdeen	Corbie Hall and Field Maryculter	1,000		
Dundee United	Dundee	GA Arena	1,000	1st in Second Division East (promoted)	
Dunfermline Athletic	Cowdenbeath	Humbug Park	1,000	2nd	
Stirling Uni Development	Stirling			7th	
Falkirk Ladies	Denny	Westfield Park	1,000	8th	
Forfar Farmington Development	Forfar			5th	
Granite City	Aberdeen			1st in Second Division North (promoted)	
Inverness City	Inverness	Jubilee Park	1,000	8th in SWPL 2 (relegated)	
Tayside Ladies	Dundee	St Pauls Academy	1,000	9th	

=== Standings ===
Pos	Team	Pld	W	D	L	GF	GA	GD	Pts	Qualification or relegation
1	Central Girls	18	17	0	1	102	18	+84	51	2018 SWPL 2
2	Dundee United	18	13	3	2	97	30	+67	42	
3	Dunfermline Athletic	18	12	2	4	57	37	+20	38	
4	Granite City	18	10	3	5	52	43	+9	33	
5	Inverness City	18	8	1	9	37	45	−8	25	
6	Aberdeen Reserves	18	7	1	10	46	55	−9	22	
7	Stirling Uni Development	18	6	2	10	41	53	−12	20	
8	Dee Ladies	18	5	1	12	38	74	−36	16	
9	Falkirk Ladies	18	5	0	13	35	63	−28	15	
10	Westdyke Dee Vale	18	0	1	17	19	106	−87	1	
11	Forfar Farmington Development	0	0	0	0	0	0	0	0	2018 SWFL 2
12	Tayside Ladies	0	0	0	0	0	0	0	0	2018 SWFL 2

Updated to match(es) played on 22 December 2017. Source: soccerway.com and scotwomensfootball.com
Rules for classification: 1) Points; 2) Goal difference; 3) Number of goals scored

=== Results ===
Scottish Women's Football

== SWFL 1 South ==
=== Teams ===
Locations of teams in the 2017 SWFL 1 South

Team	Location	Home ground	Capacity	2015 position	source
Boroughmuir Thistle	Edinburgh	Meggetland Sport Complex	1,000	9th	
Celtic Academy	Lennoxtown	Lennoxtown Training Centre	1,000	4th	
Cumbernauld Colts	Cumbernauld	Ravenswood Playing Fields	1,000	7th	
Glasgow City Development	Glasgow			6th	
Heart of Midlothian U23s	Edinburgh			10th	
Hibernian Development	Edinburgh	Meggetland Sport Complex	1,000	2nd	
FC Kilmarnock	Hurlford	Blair Park	1,500	5th	
Partick Thistle	Glasgow			1st in Second Division Central (promoted)	
Queen's Park	Glasgow	Toryglen Regional Football Centre		7th in SWPL 2 (relegated)	
Rangers Development	Glasgow			3rd	
Renfrew	Renfrew	New Western Park	1,000	1st in Second Division South-West (promoted)	
Westerlands	Glasgow			8th	

=== Standings ===
Pos	Team	Pld	W	D	L	GF	GA	GD	Pts	Qualification or relegation
1	FC Kilmarnock (C)	20	19	0	1	69	17	+52	57	2018 SWPL 2
2	Celtic Academy	20	11	4	5	64	29	+35	37	
3	Partick Thistle	20	11	4	5	50	44	+6	37	
4	Cumbernauld Colts	20	10	4	6	44	43	+1	34	
5	Renfrew	20	10	1	9	56	47	+9	31	
6	Hibernian Development	20	9	3	8	53	44	+9	30	
7	Rangers Development	20	8	0	12	43	44	−1	24	
8	Westerlands	20	6	5	9	48	60	−12	23	
9	Queen's Park	20	6	3	11	45	60	−15	21	
10	Boroughmuir Thistle	20	4	4	12	35	51	−16	16	
11	Heart of Midlothian U23s	20	2	0	18	17	85	−68	6	2018 SWFL 2
12	Glasgow City Development	0	0	0	0	0	0	0	0	2018 SWFL 2

Rules for classification: 1) Points; 2) Goal difference; 3) Number of goals scored

=== Results ===
Scottish Women's Football
