= Thelma Björk Einarsdóttir =

Icelandic footballer

Personal information
- Date of birth: 11 July 1990 (age 36)
- Place of birth: Iceland
- Positions: Defender; midfielder

Youth career
- 1996-2009: Valur

College career
Years	Team	Apps	(Gls)
2011–2014	California Golden Bears		

Senior career*
Years	Team	Apps	(Gls)
2006-2013	Valur	66	(4)
2014-2015	Selfoss	11	(0)
2016-2019	Valur	42	(2)
2021	KR	6	(0)

International career^{‡}
2007	Iceland U-16	3	(0)
2007-2009	Iceland U-19	8	(0)
2012	Iceland U-23	1	(0)
2010-2017	Iceland	12	(0)
- * Club domestic league appearances and goals as of 17 May 2021 ‡ National team caps and goals as of 17 May 2021

Thelma Björk Einarsdóttir (born 11 July 1990) is an Icelandic former footballer who played as a midfielder and defender. She capped 12 times for the Icelandic national team from 2010 to 2017. Thelma spent the majority of her career with Valur in the Icelandic top-tier Úrvalsdeild kvenna, winning the national championship six times and the Icelandic Cup three times.

She announced her retirement from football in February 2020. However, she returned to football in August 2021, appearing in 6 matches for KR in the second-tier 1. deild kvenna.
