= Ana Leite =

Portuguese-German footballer

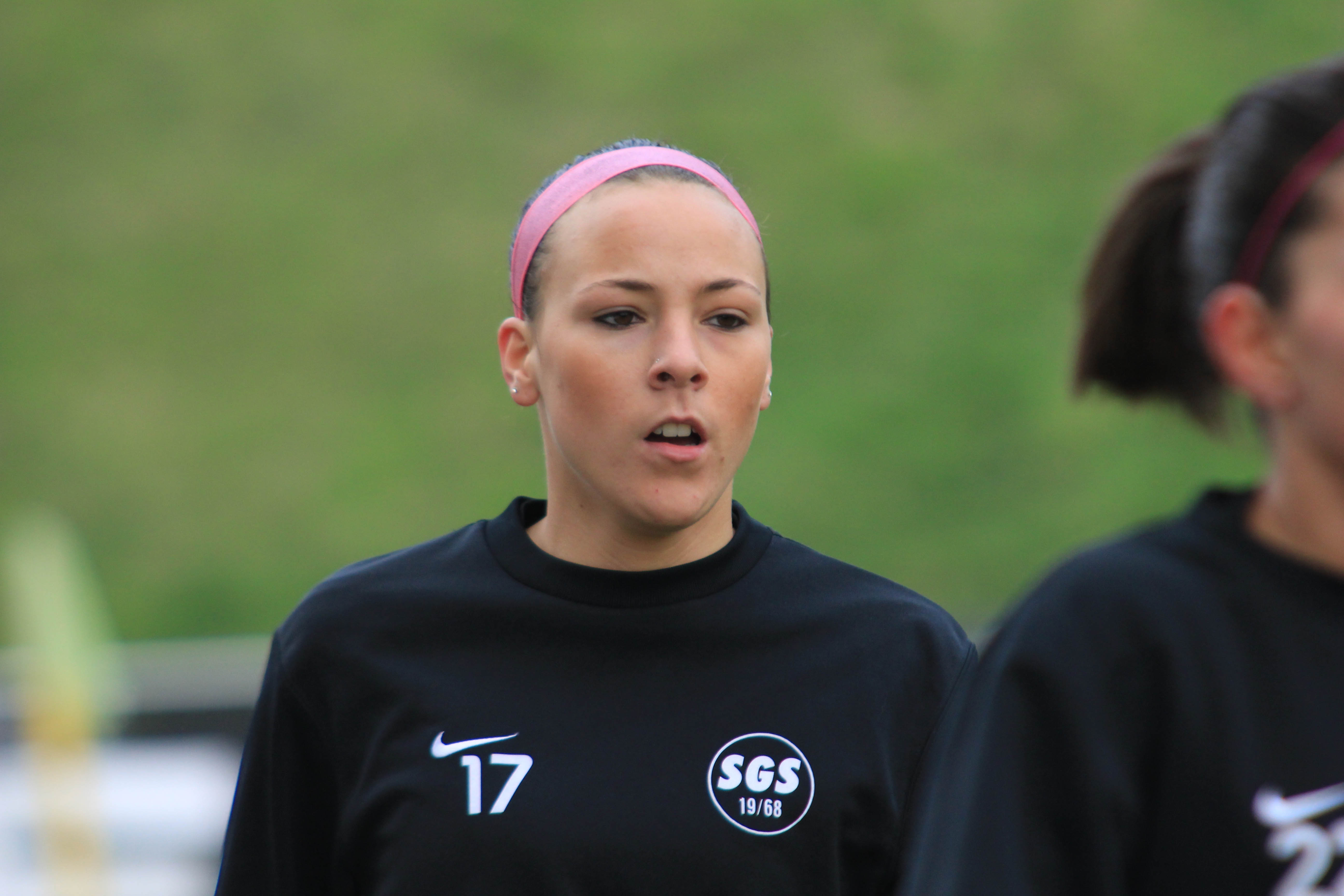
- Leite in 2012

Personal information
- Full name: Ana Cristina Oliveira Leite
- Date of birth: 23 October 1991 (age 35)
- Place of birth: Bocholt, Germany
- Height: 1.67 m (5 ft 6 in)
- Position: Midfielder

Team information
- Current team: YB Frauen
- Number: 21

Youth career
- 2007–2010: FCR Duisburg II

Senior career*
Years	Team	Apps	(Gls)
2007–2010	FCR Duisburg	4	(1)
2010–2014	SGS Essen	54	(5)
2015–2016	Borussia Mönchengladbach	4	(0)
2016–2017	Bayer 04 Leverkusen	10	(0)
2017–2018	Sporting CP		(0)
2018–2019	Bayer 04 Leverkusen	17	(0)
2019-2023	Borussia Bocholt	41	(1)
2023-	YB Frauen	13	(0)

International career^{‡}
2010–	Portugal	49	(1)
- * Club domestic league appearances and goals ‡ National team caps and goals as of 23 July 2017

Ana Cristina Oliveira Leite (born 23 October 1991) is a Portuguese-German football forward, currently playing for YB Frauen in Switzerland's Swiss Women's Super League.

Born in Bocholt, Germany, Ana Cristina played club football in the Frauen Bundesliga while she studied at university in Bochum.

She was a member of the U-17 German national team, but subsequently chose to play for Portugal. She debuted for the senior Portugal women's national football team in the 2010 Algarve Cup and debuted one month later against Italy in the 2011 World Cup qualifying.

== Honours ==
FCR 2001 Duisburg

- UEFA Women's Champions League: Winner 2008–09
- DFB-Pokal: Winner 2008–2009, 2009–2010
