= Melissa Antunes =

Canadian-born Portuguese footballer

Personal information
- Date of birth: 8 January 1990 (age 36)
- Place of birth: Montreal, Quebec, Canada
- Height: 1.65 m (5 ft 5 in)
- Position: Midfielder

Team information
- Current team: S.C. Braga

Youth career
- 1999–2001: Fair-play
- 2001–2005: Merelinense F.C.

Senior career*
| Years | Team | Apps | (Gls) |
| 2005–2008 | Maria da Fonte (Futsal) | | |
| 2008–2009 | Gualtar (Futsal) | | |
| 2009–2011 | Maria da Fonte (Futsal) | | |
| 2012–2014 | ARJ Mogege (Futsal) | | |
| 2014–2016 | Santa Luzia (Futsal) | 33 | (21) |
| 2016–2018 | S.C. Braga | 29 | (15) |

International career
| 2006–2008 | Portugal U19 | 18 | (5) |
| 2011–2016 | Portugal women's futsal | 44 | (30) |
| 2009– | Portugal | 32 | (1) |
- * Club domestic league appearances and goals

Melissa Antunes (born 8 January 1990) is a Portuguese footballer who most recently played as a midfielder for S.C. Braga in the Campeonato Nacional de Futebol Feminino.

== Early life ==
Antunes was born in Canada but moved to Portugal at a young age. She started to play women's futsal as a child.

== Career ==
=== Club ===
Antunes started playing adult women's futsal in her adolescence in semi-professional leagues and teams around Portugal. She played the sport for most of her career. In 2016, she signed with her first women's football team, S.C. Braga, that plays in the Portuguese's semi-professional women's football league. She stated several times that she did not intend to leave futsal but as she was offered a contract by Braga she could not decline it, as she is an S.C. Braga fan since a young age.

=== International ===
Antunes first played for Portugal U19 team on 26 September 2006, in a match against Hungary U19 at a 2006 UEFA Women's Under-19 Championship qualifying game. She then went to represent the team until 2008, earning 18 caps and scoring 5 goals.

On 16 February 2008, Antunes debuted for Portugal in a UEFA Women's Euro 2009 qualifying match against Slovakia. She then went to represent Portugal in several competitions until 2011. In that year, she transitioned to represent Portugal women's futsal team. She debuted for the futsal team on 5 December 2011, in a 4–0 win against Japan at the first stage of the 2011 Women's Futsal World Tournament in Fortaleza, Brazil. Portugal finished third in that competition as she played all the team's matches in the tournament. Antunes resumed representing Portugal football team in February 2012, in a 6–0 win against Armenia. She then started playing for both teams concomitantly until September 2012 when Antunes decided to play internationally only for the futsal team. Until December 2016, she played for the team in several women's futsal tournaments (including 6 Women's Futsal World Tournament) and earned 44 caps, scoring 30 goals.

After signing with S.C. Braga in December 2016, Antunes resumed playing women's football and in February 2017, she was selected by coach Francisco Neto to represent Portugal at the 2017 Algarve Cup. On 3 March 2017, she resumed playing for Portugal in a 6–0 defeat against Denmark women's national football team, putting an end in a five years-hiatus from the national team. On 6 July 2017, Antunes was selected by Francisco Neto to represent Portugal at the UEFA Women's Euro 2017, the first time the Portuguese women's national team qualified for a major tournament. Antunes played two matches in the tournament as Portugal was eliminated in the competition's first stage.

== Personal life ==
Like many Portuguese international women's football players, Antunes is not a professional athlete. After signing with S.C. Braga in December 2016, she started to be paid for playing football for the first time in her life. However, her earnings are not enough to grant her a livelihood, so she is forced to keep other professional activities concomitantly with football. Antunes is a graduate in physical education and works as a teacher at the Universidade de Fafe in Fafe, Portugal. She also works as a sports agent.
