= Greece women's national football team results (2010–2019) =

- Win Draw Loss

This is a list of the Greece women's national football team results and scheduled fixtures from 2010 to 2019.

== Results ==
Legend

Win Draw Lose Fixture

=== 2010 ===
15 April 2010 2011 FIFA Women's World Cup qualification	Georgia	0–3	Greece	Tbilisi, Georgia
14:00 EEST		UEFA; HFF	Gkatzogianni 23'; Chalkiadaki 28'; Sidira 60'	Stadium: Mikheil Meskhi Stadium; Referee: Leen Martens (Belgium)

19 June 2010 2011 FIFA Women's World Cup qualification	Denmark	7–0	Greece	Vejle, Denmark
15:30 EEST	Røddik Hansen 7'; J. Rasmussen 45+1', 80'; Pape 49' (pen.); Kakambouki 50' (o.g.); Paaske-Sørensen 77'; Gajhede 79'	UEFA; HFF		Stadium: Vejle Stadium; Referee: Teodora Albon (Romania)

21 August 2010 2011 FIFA Women's World Cup qualification	Scotland	4–1	Greece	Dumbarton, Scotland
16:00 EEST	Beattie 22'; Fleeting 24'; Corsie 81'; Grant 83'	UEFA; HFF	Sidira 6' (pen.)	Stadium: Dumbarton Football Stadium; Referee: Gyöngyi Gaál (Hungary)

25 August 2010 2011 FIFA Women's World Cup qualification	Greece	1–2	Bulgaria	Arta, Greece
17:30 EEST	Kakambouki 5'	UEFA; HFF	Radoyska 69'; Kostova 80' (pen.)	Stadium: Arta Municipal Stadium; Referee: Mihaela Gurdon Bašimamović (Croatia)

=== 2011 ===
21 October 2011 UEFA Women's Euro 2013 qualifying	Poland	2–0	Greece	Nowy Sącz, Poland
17:00 EEST	Żelazko 45+4' (pen.), 49'	UEFA; HFF		Stadium: IM Ksiedza Wladyslaw; Attendance: 500; Referee: Séverine Zinck (France)

26 October 2011 UEFA Women's Euro 2013 qualifying	North Macedonia	1–1	Greece	Prilep, North Macedonia
15:00 EEST	Andonova 86'	UEFA; HFF	Papadopoulou 37'	Stadium: Stadion Goce Delčev; Attendance: 600; Referee: Elia Martinez (Spain)

19 November 2011 UEFA Women's Euro 2013 qualifying	Greece	0–4	Russia	Athens, Greece
15:00 EET		UEFA; HFF	Petrova 23', 78'; Sochneva 58'; Terekhova 79'	Stadium: Yiannis Pathiakakis Stadium; Attendance: 122; Referee: Pernilla Larsson (Sweden)

23 November 2011 UEFA Women's Euro 2013 qualifying	Italy	2–0	Greece	Trani, Italy
15:00 EET	Gabbiadini 59'; Domenichetti 83'	UEFA; HFF		Stadium: Nicola Lapi Stadium; Attendance: 1,600; Referee: Floarea Ionescu (Romania)

=== 2012 ===
15 February 2012 UEFA Women's Euro 2013 qualifying	Greece	2–3	Bosnia and Herzegovina	Thessaloniki, Greece
15:00 EET	Panteliadou 75', 89'	UEFA; HFF	Kuliš 8', 21'; Murić 60'	Stadium: Kleanthis Vikelidis Stadium; Attendance: 409; Referee: Ginta Pēce (Latvia)

31 March 2012 UEFA Women's Euro 2013 qualifying	Greece	1–1	Poland	Athens, Greece
16:00 EEST	Moskofidou 38'	UEFA; HFF	Sałata 20'	Stadium: Nea Smyrni Stadium; Attendance: 279; Referee: Anja Kunick (Germany)

4 April 2012 UEFA Women's Euro 2013 qualifying	Greece	2–2	North Macedonia	Athens, Greece
16:00 EEST	Mitkou 32'; Moskofidou 58'	UEFA; HFF	Rochi 23', 45+1'	Stadium: Nea Smyrni Stadium; Attendance: 189; Referee: Hilal Tuba Tosun Ayer (Turkey)

16 June 2012 UEFA Women's Euro 2013 qualifying	Russia	4–0	Greece	Krasnoarmeysk, Russia
17:00 EEST	Kostyukova 24'; Suslova 28'; Sochneva 60'; Shlyapina 68'	UEFA; HFF		Stadium: Krasnoarmeysk Stadium; Attendance: 1,500; Referee: Paloma Quintero Siles (Spain)

15 September 2012 UEFA Women's Euro 2013 qualifying	Bosnia and Herzegovina	1–1	Greece	Sarajevo, Bosnia and Herzegovina
18:00 EEST	Šabić 16'	UEFA; HFF	Sidira 56' (pen.)	Stadium: Asim Ferhatovic Hase Stadium; Attendance: 80; Referee: Sabine Bonnin (France)

19 September 2012 UEFA Women's Euro 2013 qualifying	Greece	0–0	Italy	Athens, Greece
17:00 EEST		UEFA; HFF		Stadium: Nea Smyrni Stadium; Attendance: 223; Referee: Lina Lehtovaara (Finland)

=== 2013 ===
15 January 2013 Friendly	Greece	0–3	Wales	Athens, Greece
13:30 EET		HFF	Fishlock 38', 89'; Ward 59'	Stadium: Glyfada Municipal Stadium

1 June 2013 Friendly	Romania	4–0	Greece	Bucharest, Romania
17:30 EEST	30'; 39'; 65'; 88'	HFF		Stadium: Arena Națională

26 September 2013 2015 FIFA Women's World Cup qualification	Greece	1–5	Portugal	Fyli, Greece
17:30 EEST	Pelekouda 74'	UEFA; HFF	Luís 6', 42'; Xera 68' (o.g.); Fernandes 80'; Silva 90+2'	Stadium: Fyli Municipal Stadium; Attendance: 108; Referee: Lina Lehtovaara (Finland)

26 October 2013 2015 FIFA Women's World Cup qualification	Greece	1–7	Belgium	Livadeia, Greece
16:30 EEST	Koggouli 42'	UEFA; HFF	Zeler 15', 27', 45+1' (pen.); Wullaert 58', 75'; Coutereels 61' (pen.); van de Putte 74'	Stadium: Levadia Municipal Stadium; Attendance: 578; Referee: Elia Martinez (Spain)

30 October 2013 2015 FIFA Women's World Cup qualification	Albania	1–0	Greece	Tirana, Albania
15:30 EET	Velaj 52'	UEFA; HFF		Stadium: Qemal Stafa Stadium; Attendance: 1,000; Referee: Aneliya Sinabova (Bulgaria)

23 November 2013 2015 FIFA Women's World Cup qualification	Netherlands	7–0	Greece	Rotterdam, Netherlands
20:00 EET	Martens 9', 60'; Miedema 23', 29', 64'; Melis 37' (pen.); van den Berg 90'	UEFA; HFF		Stadium: Van Donge & De Roo Stadion; Attendance: 3,040; Referee: Simona Ghisletta (Switzerland)

=== 2014 ===
13 February 2014 2015 FIFA Women's World Cup qualification	Greece	0–5	Norway	Komotini, Greece
15:00 EET		UEFA; HFF	Hegland 45+1'; Thorsnes 60', 75'; Hegerberg 66'; Bjånesøy 89'	Stadium: Komotini Municipal Stadium; Attendance: 917; Referee: Vesna Budimir (Croatia)

12 March 2014 Friendly	Greece	3–0	Cyprus	Athens, Greece
15:00 EET	Koggouli 7', 28'; Moskofidou 34'	HFF		Stadium: Glyfada Municipal Stadium; Referee: Eleni Lampadariou (Greece)

5 April 2014 2015 FIFA Women's World Cup qualification	Greece	0–6	Netherlands	Heraklion, Greece
17:30 EEST		UEFA; HFF	Melis 7'; Middag 32'; Miedema 40'; van den Berg 47'; Spitse 65'; Bakker 90'	Stadium: Pankritio Stadium; Attendance: 792; Referee: Petra Chudá (Slovakia)

9 April 2014 2015 FIFA Women's World Cup qualification	Portugal	1–0	Greece	Sertã, Portugal
17:00 EEST	Neto 78'	UEFA; HFF		Stadium: Municipal Stadium Dr Marques Dos Santo; Attendance: 1,827; Referee: Anastasia Pustovoitova (Russia)

14 June 2014 2015 FIFA Women's World Cup qualification	Norway	6–0	Greece	Bergen, Norway
17:00 EEST	Hegerberg 3'; Hansen 25'; Mjelde 27'; Berge 32'; Herlovsen 43'; Haavi 58'	UEFA		Stadium: Brann Stadion; Attendance: 3,412; Referee: Esther Staubli (Switzerland)

13 September 2014 2015 FIFA Women's World Cup qualification	Belgium	11–0	Greece	Heverlee, Belgium
17:00 EEST	De Caigny 16', 71'; Zeler 34'; Mermans 40', 50'; Wullaert 46', 54', 69', 82'; Cayman 68'; Van Gorp 73'	UEFA; HFF		Stadium: Den Dreef; Attendance: 1,527; Referee: Yuliya Medvedeva-Keldyusheva (Kazakhstan)

17 September 2014 2015 FIFA Women's World Cup qualification	Greece	4–0	Albania	Veria, Greece
17:30 EEST	Franja 2', o.g.'; Kokoviadou 31'; Koggouli 74'; Panteliadou 90+2'	UEFA; HFF		Stadium: Veria Stadium; Attendance: 312; Referee: Sabine Bonnin (France)

=== 2015 ===
12 March 2015 Aphrodite Women Cup	Greece	14–0	Lebanon	Pegeia, Cyprus
11:00 EEST	Panteliadou; Moskofidou; Kydonaki; Koggouli; Markou; Arvanitaki; Kokoviadou	HFF		Stadium: Peyia Municipal Stadium

13 March 2015 Aphrodite Women Cup	Greece	7–0	United Arab Emirates	Pegeia, Cyprus
11:00 EEST	Moskofidou; Sidira; Panteliadou; Kokoviadou; Papadopoulou; Chatzigiannidou	HFF		Stadium: Peyia Municipal Stadium

15 March 2015 Aphrodite Women Cup	Latvia	1–4	Greece	Pegeia, Cyprus
15:00 EEST	Goal	HFF	Koggouli; Markou; Kokoviadou	Stadium: Peyia Municipal Stadium

18 March 2015 Aphrodite Women Cup	Cyprus	0–2	Greece	Paphos, Cyprus
15:00 EEST		HFF	Koggouli 38'; Sidira 76'	Stadium: Stelios Kyriakides Stadium

17 June 2015 Friendly	Greece	0–1	Hungary	Loutraki, Greece
18:00 EEST		MLSZ	Szarvas 46'	Stadium: Loutraki Municipal Stadium

19 June 2015 Friendly	Greece	1–1	Hungary	Loutraki, Greece
17:00 EEST	78'	MLSZ	Kaján 90+1'	Stadium: Loutraki Municipal Stadium

22 October 2015 UEFA Women's Euro 2017 qualifying	Albania	1–4	Greece	Fier, Albania
15:00 EEST	Kurbogaj 23'	UEFA; HFF	Zani 14' (o.g.); Kydonaki 27'; Sidira 37'; Markou 90+2'	Stadium: Loni Papuçiu Stadium; Attendance: 1,000; Referee: Zuzana Štrpková (Slovakia)

27 November 2015 UEFA Women's Euro 2017 qualifying	Greece	1–3	Romania	Katerini, Greece
15:00 EET	Sarri 65'	UEFA; HFF	Rus 10'; Voicu 45+1'; Spânu 90+1'	Stadium: Katerini Stadium; Attendance: 303; Referee: Irina Turovskaya (Belarus)

1 December 2015 UEFA Women's Euro 2017 qualifying	Greece	0–3	France	Katerini, Greece
19:45 EET		UEFA; HFF	Bilbault 12'; Le Bihan 72'; Le Sommer 75'	Stadium: Katerini Stadium; Attendance: 511; Referee: Vivian Peeters (Netherlands)

=== 2016 ===
26 January 2016 UEFA Women's Euro 2017 qualifying	Greece	3–2	Albania	Trikala, Greece
14:00 EET	Sidira 6' (pen.); Koggouli 10'; Panteliadou 15'	UEFA; HFF	Velaj 26'; Hashani 41'	Stadium: Trikala Municipal Stadium; Attendance: 2,031; Referee: Virginie Derouaux (Belgium)

8 March 2016 UEFA Women's Euro 2017 qualifying	Greece	1–3	Ukraine	Athens, Greece
14:30 EET	Kravets 64' (o.g.)	UEFA; HFF	Apanaschenko 31' (pen.); Kalinina 68'; Boychenko 80'	Stadium: Acharnes Stadium; Attendance: 304; Referee: Karolina Radzik-Johan (Poland)

3 June 2016 UEFA Women's Euro 2017 qualifying	France	1–0	Greece	Rennes, France
22:00 EEST	Le Sommer 36'	UEFA; HFF		Stadium: Roazhon Park; Attendance: 24,835; Referee: Esther Azzopardi (Malta)

7 June 2016 UEFA Women's Euro 2017 qualifying	Ukraine	2–0	Greece	Lviv, Ukraine
19:00 EEST	Apanaschenko 2' (pen.); Boychenko 44'	UEFA; HFF		Stadium: Arena Lviv; Attendance: 3,102; Referee: Linn Andersson (Sweden)

20 September 2016 UEFA Women's Euro 2017 qualifying	Romania	4–0	Greece	Cluj-Napoca, Romania
20:00 EEST	Lunca 5'; Ficzay 15'; Vătafu 76'; Bâtea 79'	UEFA; HFF		Stadium: Dr. Constantin Rădulescu Stadium; Attendance: 1,264; Referee: Esther Staubli (Switzerland)

23 November 2016 Friendly	Greece	5–1	Cyprus	Komotini, Greece
13:00 EET	Kokoviadou 7', 59'; Sidira 15'; Nati 46'; Spyridonidou 90+2'	HFF	Giannou 38'	Stadium: Komotini Municipal Stadium

25 November 2016 Friendly	Greece	5–1	Cyprus	Komotini, Greece
13:00 EET	Kydonaki 31', 35'; Papadopoulou 51'; Panteliadou 71'; Markou 89'	HFF	Chrysostomou 11'	Stadium: Komotini Municipal Stadium; Referee: Andromachi Tsiofliki (Greece)

=== 2017 ===
6 April 2017 2019 FIFA Women's World Cup qualification	Greece	1–0	Malta	Tirana, Albania
15:00 EEST	Papadopoulou 18'	UEFA; HFF		Stadium: Selman Stërmasi Stadium; Attendance: 100; Referee: Lina Lehtovaara (Finland)

8 April 2017 2019 FIFA Women's World Cup qualification	Greece	6–0	Kosovo	Tirana, Albania
13:00 EEST	Markou 33'; Chatzigiannidou 39'; Kakambouki 51'; Nati 57'; Koggouli 76'; Sidira 82'	UEFA; HFF		Stadium: Selman Stërmasi Stadium; Attendance: 100; Referee: Amy Rayner (England)

11 April 2017 2019 FIFA Women's World Cup qualification	Albania	2–1	Greece	Elbasan, Albania
15:00 EEST	Doci 16'; Velaj 90'	UEFA; HFF	Nati 18'	Stadium: Elbasan Arena; Attendance: 4,000; Referee: Lina Lehtovaara (Finland)

9 June 2017 Friendly	Slovakia	1–0	Greece	Poprad, Slovakia
19:00 EEST	Mikolajová 36'	HFF		Stadium: NTC Poprad

12 June 2017 Friendly	Slovakia	1–1	Greece	Ružomberok, Slovakia
19:00 EEST	Fabová 79'	HFF	Spyridonidou 18'	Stadium: Štadión pod Čebraťom

23 October 2017 Friendly	Poland	3–0	Greece	Ostróda, Poland
19:00 EEST	Dudek 30'; Kamczyk 58'; Kaletka 74'	HFF		Stadium: Ostróda Municipal Stadium; Attendance: 2,214

=== 2018 ===
6 June 2018 Friendly	Hungary	0–0	Greece	Telki, Hungary
14:00 EEST		HFF		Stadium: Globall Football Park

8 November 2018 Friendly	Greece	1–1	Slovakia	Prosotsani, Greece
16:00 EET	Moraitou 42'	HFF	Mikolajová 51'	Stadium: Georgios Makris Stadium

11 November 2018 Friendly	Greece	1–1	Slovakia	Kavala, Greece
13:00 EET	Koggouli 83'	HFF	Vojteková 4'	Stadium: Anthi Karagianni Stadium

=== 2019 ===
8 October 2019 UEFA Women's Euro 2022 qualifying	Greece	0–5	Germany	Thessaloniki, Greece
15:00 EEST		UEFA; HFF	Popp 33'; Oberdorf 40'; Starke 66'; Bremer 75'; Bühl 90'	Stadium: Kleanthis Vikelidis Stadium; Attendance: 510; Referee: Vera Opeykina (Russia)

6 November 2019 UEFA Women's Euro 2022 qualifying	Montenegro	0–4	Greece	Podgorica, Montenegro
14:00 EEST		UEFA; HFF	Sidira 14', 78'; Kokoviadou 51'; Vardali 90+3'	Stadium: Podgorica City Stadium; Attendance: 53; Referee: Reelika Turi (Estonia)

12 November 2019 UEFA Women's Euro 2022 qualifying	Greece	1–1	Republic of Ireland	Athens, Greece
15:00 EEST	Spyridonidou 90+3'	UEFA; HFF	Barrett 13'	Stadium: Nea Smyrni Stadium; Attendance: 500; Referee: Henrikke Nervik (Norway)

== Record by opponent ==
Positive Record Neutral Record Negative Record

Opponents	Pld	W	D	L	GF	GA	GD
Albania	5	3	0	2	12	6	+6
Belgium	2	0	0	2	1	18	-17
Bosnia and Herzegovina	2	0	1	1	3	4	-1
Bulgaria	1	0	0	1	1	2	-1
Cyprus	4	4	0	0	15	2	+13
Denmark	1	0	0	1	0	7	-7
France	2	0	0	2	0	4	-4
Georgia	1	1	0	0	3	0	+3
Germany	1	0	0	1	0	5	-5
Hungary	3	0	2	1	1	2	-1
Republic of Ireland	1	0	1	0	1	1	0
Italy	2	0	1	1	0	2	-2
Kosovo	1	1	0	0	6	0	+6
Latvia	1	1	0	0	4	1	+3
Lebanon	1	1	0	0	14	0	+14
Malta	1	1	0	0	1	0	+1
Montenegro	1	1	0	0	4	0	+4
Netherlands	2	0	0	2	0	13	-13
North Macedonia	2	0	2	0	3	3	0
Norway	2	0	0	2	0	11	-11
Poland	3	0	1	2	1	6	-5
Portugal	2	0	0	2	1	6	-5
Romania	3	0	0	3	1	11	-10
Russia	2	0	0	2	0	8	-8
Scotland	1	0	0	1	1	4	-3
Slovakia	4	0	3	1	3	4	-1
Ukraine	2	0	0	2	1	5	-4
United Arab Emirates	1	1	0	0	7	0	+7
Wales	1	0	0	1	0	3	-3
Total (55)	55	14	11	30	84	128	-44

== Stats ==
=== Most appearances ===
#	Player	Caps
1	Natalia Chatzigiannidou	52
2	Eleni Kakambouki	50
3	Sophia Koggouli	45
3	Danai-Eleni Sidira	45
4	Anastasia Papadopoulou	40
4	Dimitra Panteliadou	40
5	Vasso Kydonaki	35
6	Chara Dimitriou	34
7	Eleni Markou	31
8	Maria Mitkou	26
9	Maria Adamaki	25
10	Eirini Vlasiadou	23

=== Top goalscorers ===
#	Player	Goals	Caps
1	Sophia Koggouli	12	45
2	Danai-Eleni Sidira	11	45
3	Dimitra Panteliadou	10	40
4	Vasiliki Moskofidou	7	21
4	Christina Kokoviadou	7	17
5	Vasso Kydonaki	5	35
5	Eleni Markou	5	31
6	Anastasia Papadopoulou	4	40
7	Sofia Nati	3	13
7	Anastasia Spyridonidou	3	10
