= UEFA Women's Euro 2013 qualifying Group 3 =

The UEFA Women's Euro 2013 qualifying – Group 3 was contested by six teams competing for one spot for the final tournament.

== Standings ==
Team qualified for UEFA Women's Euro 2013
Team competes in Play-off round

Team	Pld	W	D	L	GF	GA	GD	Pts
Norway	10	8	0	2	35	9	+26	24
Iceland	10	7	1	2	28	4	+24	22
Belgium	10	6	2	2	18	8	+10	20
Northern Ireland	10	3	2	5	12	15	−3	11
Hungary	10	3	1	6	18	22	−4	10
Bulgaria	10	0	0	10	1	54	−53	0

Source: UEFA.com

== Fixtures ==
All times are UTC+2.

19 May 2011
21:30

Iceland	6–0	Bulgaria
Viðarsdóttir 6', 36', 72' (pen.), 90+2'; Gunnarsdóttir 12'; Magnúsdóttir 63'	Report

Laugardalsvollur, Reykjavík
Attendance: 1,371
Referee: Floarea Ionescu (Romania)

17 September 2011
16:00

Belgium	2–1	Hungary
Wullaert 43'; Demoustier 85'	Report	Jakabfi 81'

Lorzestraat, Dessel
Attendance: 389
Referee: Saša Ihringová (England)
17 September 2011
18:00

Iceland	3–1	Norway
Magnúsdóttir 8', 32'; Viðarsdóttir 15' (pen.)	Report	Stensland 70'

Laugardalsvollur, Reykjavík
Attendance: 3,007
Referee: Kirsi Heikkinen (Finland)

21 September 2011
16:30

Norway	6–0	Hungary
Andersen 23'; Herlovsen 31', 62'; Lund 65'; Stensland 78'; Tofte Ims 89'	Report

Nadderud Stadion, Nadderud
Attendance: 193
Referee: Natalia Avdonchenko (Russia)
21 September 2011
21:30

Iceland	0–0	Belgium
	Report

Laugardalsvollur, Reykjavík
Attendance: 2,968
Referee: Christine Beck (Germany)

22 October 2011
14:00

Hungary	0–1	Iceland
	Report	Lárusdóttir 68'

Stadion Várkerti, Pápa
Attendance: 158
Referee: Riem Hussein (Germany)
22 October 2011
15:00

Bulgaria	0–1	Northern Ireland
	Report	Stephens 10'

Lovech Stadium, Lovech
Attendance: 24
Referee: Gordana Kuzmanović (Serbia)

26 October 2011
16:00

Belgium	0–1	Norway
	Report	Lund 66'

Lorzestraat, Dessel
Attendance: 933
Referee: Kateryna Monzul (Ukraine)
26 October 2011
20:30

Northern Ireland	0–2	Iceland
	Report	Magnúsdóttir 39'; Brynjarsdóttir 41'

The Oval, Belfast
Attendance: 382
Referee: Carina Vitulano (Italy)

27 October 2011
15:00

Bulgaria	0–4	Hungary
	Report	Vágó 24' (pen.), 33'; Sipos 36', 71'

Lovech Stadium, Lovech
Attendance: 150
Referee: Betina Norman (Denmark)

19 November 2011
16:00

Belgium	5–0	Bulgaria
Zeler 5', 56'; Wiard 14', 43' van Gils 70'	Report

Lorzestraat, Dessel
Attendance: 867
Referee: Zuzana Kováčová (Slovakia)
19 November 2011
20:30

Northern Ireland	3–1	Norway
McGuinness 17'; Hutton 44'; Furness 74'	Report	Herlovsen 60'

Mourneview Park, Lurgan
Attendance: 300
Referee: Florence Guillemin (France)

23 November 2011
13:00

Bulgaria	0–1	Belgium
	Report	Demoustier 13'

Lovech Stadium, Lovech
Attendance: 30
Referee: Stéphanie Frappart (France)
23 November 2011
14:00

Hungary	2–2	Northern Ireland
Hutton 76' (o.g.); Tálosi 90+2'	Report	Nelson 32'; Hutton 71'

Stadion Városi, Sopron
Attendance: 75
Referee: Ausra Kance (Lithuania)

15 February 2012
20:00

Belgium	2–2	Northern Ireland
Zeler 44'; Wullaert 53'	Report	O'Hagan 51'; Nelson 83'

Lorzestraat, Dessel
Attendance: 815
Referee: Sandra Braz Bastos (Portugal)

31 March 2012
13:00

Bulgaria	0–3	Norway
	Report	Tofte Ims 70'; Hansen 90', 90+4'

Lovech Stadium, Lovech
Attendance: 100
Referee: Ausra Kance (Lithuania)

4 April 2012
17:00

Hungary	0–5	Norway
	Report	Pedersen 8'; Tofte Ims 30'; Hansen 46', 64'; Stensland 60'

Széktói Stadion, Kecskemét
Attendance: 200
Referee: Sofia Karagiorgi (Cyprus)
4 April 2012
20:00

Belgium	1–0	Iceland
Wullaert 66'	Report

Lorzestraat, Dessel
Attendance: 1,618
Referee: Natalia Avdonchenko (Russia)

25 April 2012
20:30

Northern Ireland	0–1	Hungary
	Report	Vágó 90+4' (pen.)

Mourneview Park, Lurgan
Attendance: 358
Referee: Karolina Radzik-Johan (Poland)

19 May 2012
16:00

Northern Ireland	4–1	Bulgaria
Magill 3'; McGuinness 5'; Kireva 44' (o.g.); Milligan 55'	Report	Gospodinova 34'

Solitude, Belfast
Attendance: 275
Referee: Linn Andersson (Sweden)

16 June 2012
14:30

Norway	11–0	Bulgaria
Herlovsen 8', 12', 30', 43', 47'; Mjelde 22', 34'; Hansen 48'; Pedersen 78'; Knudsen 80' Voyskova 83' (o.g.)	Report

Sarpsborg Stadion, Sarpsborg
Attendance: 642
Referee: Sandra Braz Bastos (Portugal)
16 June 2012
18:30

Iceland	3–0	Hungary
Viðarsdóttir 7'; Magnúsdóttir 42'; Jessen 86'	Report

Laugardalsvöllur, Reykjavík
Attendance: 1,395
Referee: Cristina Dorcioman (Romania)

20 June 2012
17:00

Hungary	1–3	Belgium
Dombai-Nagy 19'	Report	Mermans 13'; Cayman 65'; Wiard 77'

Rohonci Street Stadium, Szombathely
Attendance: 225
Referee: Tanja Schett (Austria)
20 June 2012
18:00

Norway	2–0	Northern Ireland
Mykjåland 77'; Mjelde 86'	Report

Sarpsborg Stadion, Sarpsborg
Attendance: 627
Referee: Christine Baitinger (Germany)

21 June 2012
17:00

Bulgaria	0–10	Iceland
	Report	Jónsdóttir 10', 80'; Gunnarsdóttir 29', 50'; Viðarsdóttir 36', 49'; Brynjarsdóttir 64'; Ómarsdóttir 67'; Bjarnadóttir 70'; Lárusdóttir 73'

Lovech Stadium, Lovech
Attendance: 50
Referee: Elia Martinez (Spain)

15 September 2012
14:30

Norway	3–2	Belgium
Thorsnes 4'; Herlovsen 50'; Christensen 61'	Report	Wullaert 54'; Wiard 73'

Ullevaal Stadion, Oslo
Attendance: 2,457
Referee: Teodora Albon (Romania)
15 September 2012
18:15

Iceland	2–0	Northern Ireland
Magnúsdóttir 37'; Friðriksdóttir 53'	Report

Laugardalsvöllur, Reykjavík
Attendance: 2,929
Referee: Efthalia Mitsi (Greece)

19 September 2012
15:00

Hungary	9–0	Bulgaria
Vágó 12' (pen.), 14', 52', 54'; Sipos 37'; Zágor 46'; Rácz 73', 74'; Pádár 76'	Report

Stadion Városi, Sopron
Attendance: 65
Referee: Hilal Tuba Tosun Ayer (Turkey)
19 September 2012
19:30

Northern Ireland	0–2	Belgium
	Report	Cayman 77'; Zeler 86'

Windsor Park, Belfast
Attendance: 300
Referee: Esther Staubli (Switzerland)
19 September 2012
19:30

Norway	2–1	Iceland
Mjelde 39'; Thorsnes 42'	Report	Viðarsdóttir 66'

Ullevaal Stadion, Oslo
Attendance: 1,378
Referee: Bibiana Steinhaus (Germany)

== Goalscorers ==
9 goals

- (Iceland) Margrét Lára Viðarsdóttir
- (Norway) Isabell Herlovsen

7 goals

- (Hungary) Fanny Vágó

6 goals

- (Iceland) Hólmfríður Magnúsdóttir

4 goals

- (Belgium) Annaelle Wiard
- (Belgium) Tessa Wullaert
- (Belgium) Aline Zeler
- (Norway) Hege Hansen
- (Norway) Maren Mjelde

3 goals

- (Hungary) Lilla Sipos
- (Iceland) Sara Björk Gunnarsdóttir
- (Norway) Gry Tofte Ims
- (Norway) Ingvild Stensland

2 goals

- (Belgium) Janice Cayman
- (Belgium) Audrey Demoustier
- (Hungary) Zsófia Rácz
- (Iceland) Dagný Brynjarsdóttir
- (Iceland) Katrín Jónsdóttir
- (Iceland) Dóra María Lárusdóttir
- (Northern Ireland) Ashley Hutton
- (Northern Ireland) Kirsty McGuinness
- (Northern Ireland) Julie Nelson
- (Norway) Marita Skammelsrud Lund
- (Norway) Cecilie Pedersen
- (Norway) Elise Thorsnes

1 goal

- (Belgium) Lien Mermans
- (Belgium) Stéphanie van Gils
- (Bulgaria) Valentina Gospodinova
- (Hungary) Zsanett Jakabfi
- (Hungary) Anett Dombai-Nagy
- (Hungary) Anita Pádár
- (Hungary) Szabina Tálosi
- (Hungary) Bernadett Zágor
- (Iceland) Kristín Ýr Bjarnadóttir
- (Iceland) Fanndís Friðriksdóttir
- (Iceland) Sandra Jessen
- (Iceland) Katrín Ómarsdóttir
- (Northern Ireland) Rachel Furness
- (Northern Ireland) Simone Magill
- (Northern Ireland) Caragh Milligan
- (Northern Ireland) Catherine O'Hagan
- (Northern Ireland) Jessica Stephens
- (Norway) Solfrid Andersen
- (Norway) Marit Christensen
- (Norway) Caroline Hansen
- (Norway) Mari Knudsen
- (Norway) Lene Mykjåland

1 own goal

- (Bulgaria) Borislava Kireva (playing against Northern Ireland)
- (Northern Ireland) Ashley Hutton (playing against Hungary)
