= UEFA Women's Euro 2013 qualifying Group 1 =

Football tournament qualification stage

The UEFA Women's Euro 2013 qualifying – Group 1 was contested by six teams competing for one spot for the final tournament.

== Standings ==
Team qualified for UEFA Women's Euro 2013
Team competes in Play-off round

Team	Pld	W	D	L	GF	GA	GD	Pts
Italy	10	9	1	0	35	0	+35	28
Russia	10	7	1	2	31	6	+25	22
Poland	10	5	2	3	17	11	+6	17
Bosnia and Herzegovina	10	3	1	6	12	21	−9	10
Greece	10	0	5	5	7	20	−13	5
Macedonia	10	0	2	8	5	49	−44	2

Source: UEFA.com

== Results ==
All times are UTC+2.

17 September 2011
18:00

Bosnia and Herzegovina	0–1	Italy
	Report	Parisi 44' (pen.)

Asim Ferhatović Hase Stadium, Sarajevo
Attendance: 140
Referee: Jana Adámková (Czech Republic)

21 September 2011
16:00

Poland	~~0–2~~ 0–3	Russia
	Report	Morozova 18'; Sochneva 81'

OSiR Racibórz, Racibórz
Attendance: 2,500
Referee: Teodora Albon (Romania)

Game ended originally 0–2 before it was awarded a default victory in favor of Russia.

22 October 2011
13:00

Russia	4–1	Bosnia and Herzegovina
Petrova 27', 55'; Shlyapina 80', 90+1'	Report	Kuliš 54'

Rossijanka Stadion, Krasnoarmeysk
Attendance: 550
Referee: Anja Kunick (Germany)
22 October 2011
14:00

Macedonia	0–9	Italy
	Report	Conti 1', 11'; Camporese 18', 72'; Sabatino 31', 34', 79'; Parisi 36'; Gabbiadini 52'

Stadion Goce Delčev, Prilep
Attendance: 300
Referee: Knarik Grigoryan (Armenia)
22 October 2011
16:00

Poland	2–0	Greece
Żelazko 45+4' (pen.), 49'	Report

im. Ojca Władysława Augustynka, Nowy Sącz
Attendance: 500
Referee: Séverine Zinck (France)

26 October 2011
14:00

Macedonia	1–1	Greece
Andonova 86'	Report	Papadopoulou 37'

Stadion Goce Delčev, Prilep
Attendance: 600
Referee: Elia Martinez (Spain)
26 October 2011
15:00

Italy	2–0	Russia
Conti 10' (pen.), 28'	Report

Stadio Omobono Tenni, Treviso
Attendance: 800
Referee: Christina W. Pedersen (Norway)
26 October 2011
19:30

Poland	4–0	Bosnia and Herzegovina
Żelazko 45+1', 77'; Winczo 82'; Stobba 86'	Report

Stadion Ludowy, Sosnowiec
Attendance: 628
Referee: Sandra Braz Bastos (Portugal)

19 November 2011
13:00

Macedonia	2–6	Bosnia and Herzegovina
Salihi 50'; Rochi 78'	Report	Kršo 17'; Kuliš 33', 36', 60', 76'; Spahić 79'

Stadion Goce Delčev, Prilep
Attendance: 150
Referee: Natalia Aleksakhina (Ukraine)
19 November 2011
14:00

Greece	0–4	Russia
	Report	Petrova 23', 78'; Sochneva 58'; Terekhova 79'

Yiannis Pathiakakis Stadium, Athens
Attendance: 122
Referee: Pernilla Larsson (Sweden)
19 November 2011
17:00

Poland	0–5	Italy
	Report	Gabbiadini 25', 63', 82'; Panico 74'; Camporese 77'

MZOS Znicz, Pruszków
Attendance: 490
Referee: Esther Staubli (Switzerland)

23 November 2011
13:00

Macedonia	0–3	Poland
	Report	Winczo 3', 14'; Żelazko 10'

Stadion Goce Delčev, Prilep
Attendance: 212
Referee: Eszter Urban (Hungary)
23 November 2011
14:00

Italy	2–0	Greece
Gabbiadini 59'; Domenichetti 83'	Report

Stadio Comunale, Trani
Attendance: 1,600
Referee: Floarea Ionescu (Romania)

15 February 2012
14:00

Greece	2–3	Bosnia and Herzegovina
Panteliadou 75', 89'	Report	Kuliš 8', 21'; Murić 60'

Kleanthis Vikelidis Stadium, Thessaloniki
Attendance: 409
Referee: Ginta Pēce (Latvia)

31 March 2012
13:00

Russia	8–0	Macedonia
Morozova 14', 68', 82'; Mashina 21', 74', 79'; Pertseva 54'; Medved 87'	Report

Trud Stadium, Podolsk
Attendance: 1,200
Referee: Sjoukje de Jong (Netherlands)
31 March 2012
15:00

Greece	1–1	Poland
Moskofidou 38'	Report	Sałata 20'

Nea Smyrni Stadium, Athens
Attendance: 279
Referee: Anja Kunick (Germany)
31 March 2012
16:00

Italy	4–0	Bosnia and Herzegovina
Panico 14', 74'; Camporese 40'; Conti 46'	Report

Stadio Paolo Mazza, Ferrara
Attendance: 1,700
Referee: Esther Azzopardi (Malta)

4 April 2012
13:00

Russia	0–2	Italy
	Report	Panico 8', 65'

Trud Stadium, Podolsk
Attendance: 6,100
Referee: Saša Ihringová (England)
4 April 2012
15:00

Greece	2–2	Macedonia
Mitkou 32'; Moskofidou 58'	Report	Rochi 23', 45+1'

Nea Smyrni Stadium, Athens
Attendance: 189
Referee: Hilal Tuba Tosun Ayer (Turkey)

16 June 2012
15:00

Italy	9–0	Macedonia
Panico 34', 48', 55'; Manieri 31', 45'; Iannella 54'; Camporese 62'; Sabatino 78'; Tona 78'	Report

Stadio Olimpico di Torino, Turin
Attendance: 3,000
Referee: Ausra Kance (Lithuania)
16 June 2012
16:00

Russia	4–0	Greece
Kostyukova 24'; Suslova 28'; Sochneva 60'; Shlyapina 68'	Report

Rossijanka Stadion, Krasnoarmeysk
Attendance: 1,500
Referee: Paloma Quintero Siles (Spain)
16 June 2012
17:00

Bosnia and Herzegovina	0–2	Poland
	Report	Żelazko 9', 27' (pen.)

Asim Ferhatović Hase Stadium, Sarajevo
Attendance: 150
Referee: Kateryna Monzul (Ukraine)

20 June 2012
17:00

Poland	4–0	Macedonia
Leśnik 4'; Sałata 35', 51'; Żelazko 67'	Report

Stadion Miejski im. Grzegorza Duneckiego, Toruń
Attendance: 600
Referee: Petra Chudá (Slovakia)

21 June 2012
17:00

Bosnia and Herzegovina	0–1	Russia
	Report	Morozova 73' (pen.)

Asim Ferhatović Hase Stadium, Sarajevo
Attendance: 150
Referee: Morag Pirie (Scotland)

15 September 2012
15:30

Macedonia	0–6	Russia
	Report	Shlyapina 32', 41', 78'; Mashina 58'; Korovkina 87', 90'

Stadion Goce Delčev, Prilep
Attendance: 300
Referee: Aneliya Sinabova (Bulgaria)
15 September 2012
17:00

Bosnia and Herzegovina	1–1	Greece
Šabić 16'	Report	Sidira 56' (pen.)

Asim Ferhatović Hase Stadium, Sarajevo
Attendance: 80
Referee: Sabine Bonnin (France)

16 September 2012
15:00

Italy	1–0	Poland
Panico 86'	Report

Stadio Riviera delle Palme, San Benedetto del Tronto
Attendance: 390
Referee: Kirsi Heikkinen (Finland)

19 September 2012
16:00

Greece	0–0	Italy
	Report

Nea Smyrni Stadium, Athens
Attendance: 223
Referee: Lina Lehtovaara (Finland)
19 September 2012
17:00

Bosnia and Herzegovina	1–0	Macedonia
Fetahović 31'	Report

Asim Ferhatović Hase Stadium, Sarajevo
Attendance: 60
Referee: Venera Muradova (Azerbaijan)
19 September 2012
18:00

Russia	1–1	Poland
Korovkina 73'	Report	Balcerzak 45'

Rodina Stadium, Khimki
Attendance: 800
Referee: Christine Baitinger (Germany)

== Goalscorers ==
9 goals

- (Italy) Patrizia Panico

7 goals

- (Bosnia and Herzegovina) Lidija Kuliš

6 goals

- (Poland) Anna Żelazko

5 goals

- (Italy) Pamela Conti
- (Italy) Melania Gabbiadini
- (Italy) Elisa Camporese
- (Russia) Elena Morozova
- (Russia) Natalia Shlyapina

4 goals

- (Italy) Daniela Sabatino
- (Russia) Olesya Mashina
- (Russia) Olga Petrova

3 goals

- (North Macedonia) Gentjana Rochi
- (Poland) Sandra Sałata
- (Poland) Agnieszka Winczo
- (Russia) Nelli Korovkina

2 goals

- (Greece) Vasilikas Moskofidou
- (Greece) Dimitra Panteliadou
- (Italy) Alice Parisi
- (Italy) Raffaella Manieri
- (Russia) Ekaterina Sochneva

1 goal

- (Bosnia and Herzegovina) Amela Fetahović
- (Bosnia and Herzegovina) Amela Kršo
- (Bosnia and Herzegovina) Moira Murić
- (Bosnia and Herzegovina) Nejra Šabić
- (Bosnia and Herzegovina) Alisa Spahić
- (Greece) Maria Mitkou
- (Greece) Anastasia Papadopoulou
- (Greece) Danai-Eleni Sidira
- (Italy) Giulia Domenichetti
- (Italy) Elisabetta Tona
- (Italy) Sandy Iannella
- (North Macedonia) Natasha Andonova
- (North Macedonia) Afrodita Salihi
- (Poland) Patrycja Balcerzak
- (Poland) Donata Leśnik
- (Poland) Marta Stobba
- (Russia) Elena Medved
- (Russia) Natalia Pertseva
- (Russia) Elena Terekhova
