= Jordy Croux =

Belgian footballer (born 1994)

Personal information
- Date of birth: 15 January 1994 (age 32)
- Place of birth: Hasselt, Belgium
- Height: 1.72 m (5 ft 8 in)
- Position: Winger

Team information
- Current team: Yokohama F. Marinos
- Number: 11

Youth career
- 2000–2001: Runkst VV
- 2001–2011: Genk

Senior career*
Years	Team	Apps	(Gls)
2011–2015	Genk	18	(0)
2014	→ OH Leuven (loan)	2	(0)
2014–2015	→ MVV Maastricht (loan)	38	(5)
2015–2016	MVV Maastricht	40	(10)
2016–2019	Willem II	59	(2)
2019	→ MVV Maastricht (loan)	14	(3)
2019–2020	Roda JC Kerkrade	45	(6)
2021–2022	Avispa Fukuoka	56	(8)
2023–2024	Cerezo Osaka	36	(2)
2024–2025	Júbilo Iwata	40	(4)
2025–	Yokohama F. Marinos	33	(3)

International career
2009	Belgium U15	7	(2)
2009–2010	Belgium U16	11	(2)
2010–2011	Belgium U17	15	(0)
2011–2012	Belgium U18	4	(0)
2012–2013	Belgium U19	13	(1)
- * Club domestic league appearances and goals as of 11 August 2026

Jordy Croux (Dutch pronunciation: [ˈjɔrdi ˈkruks]; born 15 January 1994) is a Belgian professional footballer who plays as a winger for Japanese club Yokohama F. Marinos.

== Club career ==
=== Early career ===
Croux was born in Hasselt where he began to play football with Runkst VV. He moved to the Racing Genk academy at the age of seven where he progressed through their youth squads.

=== Genk ===
Croux made his debut for Racing Genk's senior team on 21 March 2012 during their 3–1 win against Gent when he came in as a substitute for Anthony Limbombe in the 60th minute.

In April 2012, Croux signed a contract extension with the club, which is to end in 2015. He scored his first goal for Genk in their 6–0 win against Saint-Gilloise in the sixth round of the 2012–13 Belgian Cup. It was the first goal of the match, scored in the 14th minute.

=== Avispa Fukuoka ===
On 8 January 2021, Croux moved to Japan and signing with J1 club, Avispa Fukuoka for 2021 season. After two seasons with the club he moved on to Cerezo Osaka in 2022.

=== Cerezo Osaka ===
On 7 December 2022, Croux officially transferred to Cerezo Osaka for the 2023 season.

== International career ==
=== Belgium U16 ===
Croux made his international debut for the Belgium U-16s during their 4–0 loss against the Germany U-16 team on 14 October 2009.

=== Belgium U17 ===
On 26 August 2010, Croux was part of the Belgium U-17 squad that played and won 1–0 against Switzerland U-17. He played again for the team that lost 3–1 against Spain U-17 on 26 March 2011. He played again two days later in a 2–1 loss against the England U-17 squad.

=== Belgium U18 ===
Croux appeared for the Belgium U-18 team in a 1–0 loss against the Germany U-18 team on 13 November 2011.

=== Belgium U19 ===
Croux was called up to the Belgium U-19 squad that played against Serbia U-19 in a 0–0 draw on 26 February 2012.

== Career statistics ==
=== Club ===
As of 10 July 2024

Appearances and goals by club, season and competition
Club	Season	League			National cup		League cup		Continental		Other		Total	
Club	Season	Division	Apps	Goals	Apps	Goals	Apps	Goals	Apps	Goals	Apps	Goals	Apps	Goals
Genk	2011–12	Belgian Pro League	10	0	—		—		—		—		10	0
Genk	2012–13	Belgian Pro League	6	0	2	1	—		1	0	—		9	1
Genk	2013–14	Belgian Pro League	2	0	0	0	—		0	0	1	0	3	0
Genk	Total		18	0	2	1	0	0	1	0	1	0	22	1
OH Leuven (loan)	2013–14	Belgian Pro League	2	0	—		—		—		2	0	4	0
MVV Maastricht (loan)	2014–15	Eerste Divisie	38	5	2	1	—		—		—		40	6
MVV Maastricht	2015–16	Eerste Divisie	35	8	1	0	—		—		4	2	40	10
MVV Maastricht	2016–17	Eerste Divisie	5	2	0	0	—		—		—		5	2
MVV Maastricht	Total		40	10	1	0	0	0	0	0	4	2	45	12
Willem II	2016–17	Eredivisie	29	1	1	0	—		—		—		30	1
Willem II	2017–18	Eredivisie	22	1	2	0	—		—		—		24	1
Willem II	2018–19	Eredivisie	8	0	3	0	—		—		—		11	0
Willem II	Total		59	2	6	0	0	0	0	0	0	0	65	2
MVV Maastricht (loan)	2018–19	Eerste Divisie	14	3	0	0	—		—		—		14	3
Roda JC Kerkrade	2019–20	Eerste Divisie	29	3	2	0	—		—		—		31	3
Roda JC Kerkrade	2020–21	Eerste Divisie	16	3	1	0	—		—		—		17	3
Roda JC Kerkrade	Total		45	6	3	0	0	0	0	0	0	0	48	6
Avispa Fukuoka	2021	J1 League	25	4	2	2	1	1	—		—		28	7
Avispa Fukuoka	2022	J1 League	31	4	4	0	10	1	—		—		45	5
Avispa Fukuoka	Total		56	8	6	2	11	1	0	0	0	0	73	12
Cerezo Osaka	2023	J1 League	27	2	2	0	3	0	—		—		32	2
Cerezo Osaka	2024	J1 League	9	0	2	0	3	1	—		—		14	1
Cerezo Osaka	Total		36	2	4	0	6	1	0	0	0	0	46	3
Career total			307	36	24	4	17	3	1	0	7	2	357	45

=== International ===
National team	Season	Apps	Goals
Belgium U15	2008–09	7	2
Belgium U16	2009–10	11	2
Belgium U17	2010–11	15	0
Belgium U18	2011–12	4	0
Belgium U19	2011–12	1	0
Belgium U19	2012–13	10	1
Belgium U19	Total	11	1
Career total		48	5
