= 2011–12 in Belgian football =

Football in Belgium
- Season: 2011–12

The 2011–12 football season in Belgium, which is the 109th season of competitive football in the country and runs from July 2011 until June 2012.

== National team football ==
=== Men's national football team ===
The Belgian national team started the 2011–12 season knowing they were still undefeated in 2011, but also knowing that they needed to make up for earlier mistakes during the UEFA Euro 2012 qualifying campaign. With Germany topping the qualifying group with the maximum number of points after seven matches, the battle for second place and the resulting play-offs place was between Belgium and Turkey. Turkey was one point down, but had a game in hand.

On 2 September 2011, all looked fine for the Belgians until the last few minutes, as Rauf Aliyev scored the equalizer for Azerbaijan against Belgium in Baku, while on the same day, Turkey scored a 96th-minute winner against Kazakhstan. Turkey now lead Belgium by one point and had a game in hand. Four days later, Belgium partially recovered mentally by beating the United States in a friendly, while Turkey dropped points away to Austria, only drawing 0–0.

Turkey lost second place again as they were beaten 1–3 at home to Germany, while Belgium successfully put Kazakhstan away 4–1. On the last matchday, however, Belgium needed to match the result of Turkey and while Turkey hosted Azerbaijan, Belgium played an away game in Germany, who had won all their matches so far. The miracle did not happen for Belgium as they lost 3–1 and Turkey won 1–0, causing Belgium to miss out on yet another major tournament, still waiting for one since the 2002 FIFA World Cup. The general feeling in Belgium was one of a missed chance, as the Belgian team had shown promising football throughout the campaign, but often were not able to get or hold on to a needed result. Too many mistakes were made during the campaign, with many citing the 4–4 home draw with Austria, the 1–1 home draw with Turkey and the 1–1 away draw with Azerbaijan, which all should have been won. Coach Georges Leekens, however, not blamed, as his goal was to qualify for the 2014 World Cup.

After the unsuccessful Euro 2012 qualifying campaign, Belgium continued with a series of friendlies to bridge the gap until the start of the 2014 World Cup qualification matches in September 2012. In November, Belgium overpowered Romania in a friendly in Liège, but only won 2–1 before drawing 0–0 with France in Paris. In February, a mediocre match in and against Greece resulted in a 1–1 draw.

On 13 May, the Belgian soccer fans were shocked as head coach Georges Leekens decided to quit his position and become the head coach at Club Brugge. Assistant coach Marc Wilmots was persuaded to take over the position as caretaker, while the Royal Belgian Football Association looked for a new candidate. Wilmots led the team in a 2–2 friendly draw at home against Montenegro and a 1–0 loss against England at Wembley Stadium. In the week following these matches, Wilmots was appointed as the head coach of the national team.

==== UEFA Euro 2012 qualification ====
| 2 September 2011 | Azerbaijan | 1 – 1 | Belgium | Tofik Bakhramov Stadium, Baku |
| 21:00 UTC+5 | R. Aliyev 86' | Report | Simons 55' (pen.) | Attendance: 8,000; Referee: Lee Probert (England) |

| 7 October 2011 | Belgium | 4 – 1 | Kazakhstan | King Baudouin Stadium, Brussels |
| | Simons 40' (pen.); Hazard 43'; Kompany 49'; Yevstigneyev 84' (o.g.) | Report | Nurdauletov 86' (pen.) | Attendance: 29,578; Referee: Milorad Mažić (Serbia) |

| 11 October 2011 | Germany | 3 – 1 | Belgium | Esprit Arena, Düsseldorf |
| 19:00 CET | Özil 30'; Schürrle 33'; Gómez 48' | Report | Fellaini 86' | Attendance: 48,483; Referee: Svein Oddvar Moen (Norway) |

==== Friendlies ====
| 10 August 2011 | Slovenia | 0 – 0 | Belgium | Stožice Stadium, Ljubljana |
| 20:45 CEST | | Report | | Referee: Marijo Strahonja (Croatia) |

| 6 September 2011 | Belgium | 1 – 0 | United States | King Baudouin Stadium, Brussels |
| 20:45 CEST | Lombaerts 56' | Report | | Referee: William Collum (Scotland) |

| 11 November 2011 | Belgium | 2 – 1 | Romania | Stade Maurice Dufrasne, Liège |
| 20:45 CET | Van Buyten 11'; Cociș 44' (o.g.) | Report | Niculae 67' | Referee: Saïd Ennjimi (France) |

| 15 November 2011 | France | 0 – 0 | Belgium | Stade de France, Saint-Denis |
| 20:45 CET | | | | Attendance: 60,000; Referee: César Muñiz Fernández (Spain) |

| 29 February 2012 | Greece | 1 – 1 | Belgium | Pankritio Stadium, Greece |
| 20:30 CET | Salpingidis 9' | Summary | Chadli 32' | Referee: Daniel Stalhammar (Sweden) |

| 25 May 2012 | Belgium | 2 – 2 | Montenegro | King Baudouin Stadium, Brussels |
| 20:45 CEST | Mirallas 25'; Hazard 33' (pen.) | Report | Vučinić 6'; Drinčić 75' | Referee: Clement Turpain (France) |

| 2 June 2012 | England | 1 – 0 | Belgium | Wembley Stadium, England |
| 18:15 CEST | Welbeck 36' | Report | | Referee: Peter Rasmussen (Denmark) |

=== Women's national football team ===
==== Euro 2013 qualifying ====
| 17 September 2011 | Belgium | 2 – 1 | Hungary | Lorzestraat, Dessel |
| 16:00 | Wullaert 43'; Demoustier 85' | Report | Jakabfi 81' | Attendance: 389; Referee: Saša Ihringová (England) |

| 21 September 2011 | Iceland | 0 – 0 | Belgium | Laugardalsvollur, Reykjavík |
| 21:30 | | Report | | Attendance: 2,968; Referee: Christine Beck (Germany) |

| 26 October 2011 | Belgium | 0 – 1 | Norway | Lorzestraat, Dessel |
| 16:00 | | Report | Lund 66' | Attendance: 933; Referee: Kateryna Monzul (Ukraine) |

| 19 November 2011 | Belgium | 5 – 0 | Bulgaria | Lorzestraat, Dessel |
| 16:00 | Zeler 5', 56'; Wiard 14', 43'; Van Gils 70' | Report | | Referee: Zuzana Kováčová (Slovakia) |

| 23 November 2011 | Bulgaria | 0 – 1 | Belgium | Lovech Stadium, Lovech |
| 13:00 | | Report | Demoustier 13' | Referee: Stéphanie Frappart (France) |

| 15 February 2012 | Belgium | 2 – 2 | Northern Ireland | Lorzestraat, Dessel |
| 20:00 | Zeler 44'; Wullaert 53' | Report | O'Hagan 51'; Nelson 83' | Referee: Sandra Braz Bastos (Portugal) |

| 4 April 2012 | Belgium | 1 – 0 | Iceland | Lorzestraat, Dessel |
| 19:00 | Van Broeck (yellow card) 27'; Philtjens (yellow card) 45+1'; Wullaert 66' | Summary | Magnusdottir (yellow card) 79' | Referee: (Russia) Natalia Avdonchenko |

| 19 June 2012 | Hungary | 1 – 3 | Belgium | Rohonci Street Stadium, Szombathely |
| 17:00 | Dombai-Nagy 19' | Report | Mermans 13'; Cayman 65'; Wiard 77' | Attendance: 225; Referee: (Austria) Tanja Schett |

=== Men's national under-21 team ===
==== Friendly match ====
| 9 August 2011 | Belgium | 2 – 3 | Turkey | Den Dreef, Heverlee, Belgium |
| | Benteke 9', 29' | | Gülle 60'; Kaplan 70', 87' |

==== U-21 Championship qualifiers ====
The Belgium under-21 squad is currently in Group 8 of the qualification process for the 2013 UEFA European Under-21 Football Championship.

| 1 September 2011 | Iceland | 2 – 1 | Belgium | Hlíðarendi, Reykjavík |
| 19:00 | Sigurðarson 25', 87' | Report | Benteke 42' | Referee: Miroslav Zelinka (Czech Republic) |

| 6 September 2011 | Belgium | 4 – 1 | Azerbaijan | Olympisch Stadion, Antwerp |
| 18:00 | Bruno 2'; Mertens 35'; Meunier 81'; Benteke 83' | Report | Imamverdiyev 24' | Referee: Ivan Kružliak (Slovakia) |

| 10 October 2011 | Azerbaijan | 2 – 2 | Belgium | Dalga Arena, Baku |
| 15:00 | Imamverdiyev 22'; Özkara 31' | Report | De Pauw 40'; De Jonghe 76' | Referee: Marius Avram (Romania) |

| 10 November 2011 | Norway | 2 – 2 | Belgium | Viking Stadion, Stavanger |
| 19:00 | Pedersen 57' de Lanlay 70' | Report | Bruno 2'; Badibanga 60' | Referee: Ilias Spathas (Greece) |

| 14 November 2011 | Belgium | 2 – 1 | England | Stade Charles Tondreau, Mons |
| 20:45 | Naessens 72'; El Kaddouri 90+1' | Report | Kelly 14' | Referee: Harald Lechner (Austria) |

| 29 February 2012 | England | 4 - 0 | Belgium | Riverside Stadium |
| 18:00 | Lansbury 9', 53'; Caulker 36'; Oxlade-Chamberlain 90+4' (pen.) | Summary | | Referee: (Israel) Liran Liany |

This leaves two matches, home to Norway and home to Iceland to be played in the next season.

== Promotion and relegation ==
Team promoted to 2011–12 Belgian Pro League

- Belgian Second Division Champions: OH Leuven
- Playoff winners: Mons

Teams relegated from 2010–11 Belgian Pro League

- 15th Place: Eupen (lost playoff)
- 16th Place: Charleroi

Teams promoted to 2011–12 Belgian Second Division

- Belgian Third Division A Champions: Aalst
- Belgian Third Division B Champions: WS Woluwe
- Playoff winners: Sint-Niklaas

Teams relegated from 2010-11 Belgian Second Division

- 16th Place, lost playoff: Turnhout
- 17th Place: Rupel Boom
- 18th Place: Tournai

== European Club results ==
Genk and Standard Liège participated in the qualifying rounds of the Champions League, while Westerlo, Club Brugge and Anderlecht started respectively in the second qualifying round, third qualifying round and playoff round of the Europa League.

- Partizan twice took the lead against Genk in the Third qualifying round, but Genk managed to overcome the deficit with a 2-1 victory at home and a 1–1 draw in Belgrade. After a 2–1 loss in Haifa and a 2–1 win in Genk, Genk needed penalty kicks to get past Maccabi Haifa in the Play-off round. Genk was drawn together with Bayer Leverkusen, Chelsea and Valencia and started with a promising 0-0 home draw against Valencia, followed by a 2–0 loss away to Leverkusen. After a 5–0 loss in London, supporters feared the worst when Chelsea came to play in Genk, but surprisingly, Chelsea was held to a 1–1 draw. Hopes were shattered on the next match day however, as Valencia humiliated Genk with a 7–0 victory, thereby eliminating Genk from European football with still one matchday to go. In the final match against already qualified Leverkusen, Genk maintained their unbeaten status at home, drawing for the third time.
- Unlike Genk, Standard was not able to qualify for the group stage of the Champions League, as they lost out 2–1 on aggregate to Zürich, thereby dropping into the Play-off round of the UEFA Europa League, where they were paired with Helsingborgs IF. After both a home and an away win, Standard moved on to Group B of the Group stage where they were coupled with Copenhagen, Hannover and Vorskla Poltava. After three wins and two draws, Standard qualified for the knockout phase and was sure of winning the group with still one match to go. In the knockout stages, Standard first beat Wisła Kraków on the away goals rule after drawing twice, before being paired again with Hannover 96 in the round of 16. Although Standard kept Hannover to a 2–2 draw at home, they were well beaten 4–0 in the return leg in Germany.
- Westerlo qualified for the third qualifying round of the Europa League by putting aside TPS Turku, where they lost out 5–1 on aggregate to Young Boys.
- Starting in the third qualifying round of the Europa League, Club Brugge needed to get past two opponents to qualify for the group stage. Club Brugge was twice given an unattractive draw in a far away region, as they first beat Qarabağ from Azerbaijan before eliminating Zestafoni from Georgia. Twice they secured the qualification at home and had trouble in their away match, losing 1–0 in Baku and only drawing 3–3 in Tbilisi. In the group stage, both Maribor (at home) and Braga (away) were beaten in the first two matches, before Club Brugge lost 1–2 at home to Birmingham City due to a 99th-minute winner from Chris Wood. After a 2–2 draw in Birmingham and the "miracle of Maribor" (3–4 win in Maribor when they were 3–0 down after 70 minutes), Club Brugge needed only a draw in their final home match against Braga to qualify as group winners. In the knockout stages, they were eliminated by Hannover 96 after losing both legs.
- Anderlecht qualified relatively easily for the group stage of the Europa League after eliminating Bursaspor 4–3 on aggregate, but their engine only started running properly during the group stage, where they scored a perfect six out of six victories. After putting away AEK Athens 4–1 at home, they stole the points away to Lokomotiv Moscow, winning 0–2. Then followed two wins against Sturm Graz, resulting in an early qualification already after four matchdays. In the last two matches, Anderlecht won away to AEK Athens and managed to finish the group with the maximum number of points after a final 5–3 home win against Lokomotiv. However, Anderlecht were then paired with AZ and lost both legs 1–0 in the round of 32. During the group stage, Anderlecht had equalled three records:
  - They were only the third team to score the maximum number of points in the group stage of the UEFA Europa League after Red Bull Salzburg in 2009–10 and Zenit Saint Petersburg in 2010–11.
  - Matías Suárez scored seven goals during the group stage, equalling the record set the previous season by Radamel Falcao with Porto.
  - A total of 18 goals were scored, which equals the record set by CSKA Moscow and Zenit in 2010–11.

| Date | Team | Competition | Round | Leg | Opponent | Location | Score | Belgian Team Goalscorers |
|---|---|---|---|---|---|---|---|---|
| 14 July 2011 | Westerlo | Europa League | Qual. Round 2 | Leg 1, Away | (Finland) TPS Turku | Veritas Stadion, Turku | 0-1 | Cabeke |
| 21 July 2011 | Westerlo | Europa League | Qual. Round 2 | Leg 2, Home | (Finland) TPS Turku | Het Kuipje, Westerlo | 0-0 | |
| 26 July 2011 | Genk | Champions League | Qual. Round 3 | Leg 1, Home | (Serbia) Partizan Belgrade | Cristal Arena, Genk | 2-1 | Vossen, Ogunjimi |
| 27 July 2011 | Standard Liège | Champions League | Qual. Round 3 | Leg 1, Home | (Switzerland) Zürich | Stade Maurice Dufrasne, Liège | 1-1 | González |
| 28 July 2011 | Club Brugge | Europa League | Qual. Round 3 | Leg 1, Home | (Azerbaijan) Qarabağ | Jan Breydel Stadium, Bruges | 4-1 | Vleminckx, Vázquez, Donk, Dirar |
| 28 July 2011 | Westerlo | Europa League | Qual. Round 3 | Leg 1, Away | (Switzerland) Young Boys | Stade de Suisse, Bern | 3-1 | Brüls |
| 3 August 2011 | Genk | Champions League | Qual. Round 3 | Leg 2, Away | (Serbia) Partizan | Stadion FK Partizan, Belgrade | 1-1 | Vossen |
| 3 August 2011 | Standard Liège | Champions League | Qual. Round 3 | Leg 2, Away | (Switzerland) Zürich | Letzigrund, Zürich | 1-0 | |
| 4 August 2011 | Club Brugge | Europa League | Qual. Round 3 | Leg 2, Away | (Azerbaijan) Qarabağ | Tofiq Bahramov Stadium, Baku | 1-0 | |
| 4 August 2011 | Westerlo | Europa League | Qual. Round 3 | Leg 2, Home | (Switzerland) Young Boys | Het Kuipje, Westerlo | 0-2 | |
| 17 August 2011 | Genk | Champions League | Playoff Round | Leg 1, Away | (Israel) Maccabi Haifa | Kiryat Eliezer Stadium, Haifa | 2-1 | Barda |
| 18 August 2011 | Anderlecht | Europa League | Play-off Round | Leg 1, Away | (Turkey) Bursaspor | Bursa Atatürk Stadium, Bursa | 1-2 | Legear, Jovanović |
| 18 August 2011 | Club Brugge | Europa League | Play-off Round | Leg 1, Away | (Georgia (country)) Zestafoni | David Abashidze Stadium, Zestafoni | 3-3 | Akpala, Refaelov, Hoefkens |
| 18 August 2011 | Standard Liège | Europa League | Play-off Round | Leg 1, Home | (Sweden) Helsingborgs IF | Stade Maurice Dufrasne, Liège | 1-0 | Tchité |
| 23 August 2011 | Genk | Champions League | Playoff Round | Leg 2, Home | (Israel) Maccabi Haifa | Cristal Arena, Genk | 2-1 (aet) (pen 4–1) | Vossen, Buffel |
| 25 August 2011 | Anderlecht | Europa League | Play-off Round | Leg 2, Home | (Turkey) Bursaspor | Constant Vanden Stock Stadium, Anderlecht | 2-2 | Juhász, Jovanović |
| 25 August 2011 | Club Brugge | Europa League | Play-off Round | Leg 2, Home | (Georgia (country)) Zestafoni | Jan Breydel Stadium, Bruges | 2-0 | Akpala (2) |
| 25 August 2011 | Standard Liège | Europa League | Play-off Round | Leg 2, Away | (Sweden) Helsingborgs IF | Olympia, Helsingborg | 1-3 | Leye, Berrier, Kanu |
| 13 September 2011 | Genk | Champions League | Group Stage | Matchday 1, Home | (Spain) Valencia | Cristal Arena, Genk | 0-0 | |
| 15 September 2011 | Anderlecht | Europa League | Group Stage | Matchday 1, Home | (Greece) AEK Athens | Constant Vanden Stock Stadium, Anderlecht | 4-1 | Suárez (3), Jovanović |
| 15 September 2011 | Club Brugge | Europa League | Group Stage | Matchday 1, Home | (Slovenia) Maribor | Jan Breydel Stadium, Bruges | 2-0 | Odjidja, Dirar |
| 15 September 2011 | Standard Liège | Europa League | Group Stage | Matchday 1, Away | (Germany) Hannover 96 | AWD-Arena, Hanover | 0-0 | |
| 28 September 2011 | Genk | Champions League | Group Stage | Matchday 2, Away | (Germany) Bayer Leverkusen | BayArena, Leverkusen | 2-0 | |
| 29 September 2011 | Anderlecht | Europa League | Group Stage | Matchday 2, Away | (Russia) Lokomotiv Moscow | Lokomotiv Stadium, Moscow | 0-2 | Suárez, Mbokani |
| 29 September 2011 | Club Brugge | Europa League | Group Stage | Matchday 2, Away | (Portugal) Braga | Estádio Municipal, Braga | 1-2 | Akpala, Donk |
| 29 September 2011 | Standard Liège | Europa League | Group Stage | Matchday 2, Home | (Denmark) Copenhagen | Stade Maurice Dufrasne, Liège | 3-0 | Seijas, Felipe, Kanu |
| 19 October 2011 | Genk | Champions League | Group Stage | Matchday 3, Away | (England) Chelsea | Stamford Bridge, London | 5-0 | |
| 20 October 2011 | Anderlecht | Europa League | Group Stage | Matchday 3, Away | (Austria) Sturm Graz | UPC-Arena, Graz | 0-2 | Gillet, Suárez |
| 20 October 2011 | Club Brugge | Europa League | Group Stage | Matchday 3, Home | (England) Birmingham City | Jan Breydel Stadium, Bruges | 1-2 | Akpala |
| 20 October 2011 | Standard Liège | Europa League | Group Stage | Matchday 3, Home | (Ukraine) Vorskla Poltava | Stade Maurice Dufrasne, Liège | 0-0 | |
| 1 November 2011 | Genk | Champions League | Group Stage | Matchday 4, Home | (England) Chelsea | Cristal Arena, Genk | 1-1 | Vossen |
| 3 November 2011 | Club Brugge | Europa League | Group Stage | Matchday 4, Away | (England) Birmingham City | St Andrew's, Birmingham | 2-2 | Meunier, Akpala |
| 3 November 2011 | Anderlecht | Europa League | Group Stage | Matchday 4, Home | (Austria) Sturm Graz | Constant Vanden Stock Stadium, Anderlecht | 3-0 | Gillet, Suárez, De Sutter |
| 3 November 2011 | Standard Liège | Europa League | Group Stage | Matchday 4, Away | (Ukraine) Vorskla Poltava | Butovsky Vorskla Stadium, Poltava | 1-3 | Seijas, Kanu, Tchité |
| 23 November 2011 | Genk | Champions League | Group Stage | Matchday 5, Away | (Spain) Valencia | Mestalla Stadium, Valencia | 7-0 | |
| 30 November 2011 | Club Brugge | Europa League | Group Stage | Matchday 5, Away | (Slovenia) Maribor | Ljudski vrt, Maribor | 3-4 | Dirar (2), Akpala, Donk |
| 30 November 2011 | Standard Liège | Europa League | Group Stage | Matchday 5, Home | (Germany) Hannover 96 | Stade Maurice Dufrasne, Liège | 2-0 | Tchité, Cyriac |
| 1 December 2011 | Anderlecht | Europa League | Group Stage | Matchday 5, Away | (Greece) AEK Athens | Olympic Stadium, Athens | 1-2 | Gillet (2) |
| 6 December 2011 | Genk | Champions League | Group Stage | Matchday 6, Home | (Germany) Bayer Leverkusen | Cristal Arena, Genk | 1-1 | Vossen |
| 14 December 2011 | Anderlecht | Europa League | Group Stage | Matchday 6, Home | (Russia) Lokomotiv Moscow | Constant Vanden Stock Stadium, Anderlecht | 5-3 | Kljestan, Canesin, Wasilewski, Suárez, Gillet |
| 15 December 2011 | Club Brugge | Europa League | Group Stage | Matchday 6, Home | (Portugal) Braga | Jan Breydel Stadium, Bruges | 1-1 | Vleminckx |
| 15 December 2011 | Standard Liège | Europa League | Group Stage | Matchday 6, Away | (Denmark) Copenhagen | Parken Stadium, Copenhagen | 0-1 | Batshuayi |
| 16 February 2012 | Anderlecht | Europa League | Round of 32 | Leg 1, Away | (Netherlands) AZ | AFAS Stadion, Alkmaar | 1-0 | |
| 16 February 2012 | Club Brugge | Europa League | Round of 32 | Leg 1, Away | (Germany) Hannover 96 | AWD-Arena, Hanover | 2-1 | Lestienne |
| 16 February 2012 | Standard Liège | Europa League | Round of 32 | Leg 1, Away | (Poland) Wisła Kraków | Stadion im. Henryka Reymana | 1-1 | Cyriac |
| 23 February 2012 | Anderlecht | Europa League | Round of 32 | Leg 2, Home | (Netherlands) AZ | Constant Vanden Stock Stadium, Anderlecht | 0-1 | |
| 23 February 2012 | Club Brugge | Europa League | Round of 32 | Leg 2, Home | (Germany) Hannover 96 | Jan Breydel Stadium, Bruges | 0-1 | |
| 23 February 2012 | Standard Liège | Europa League | Round of 32 | Leg 2, Home | (Poland) Wisła Kraków | Stade Maurice Dufrasne, Liège | 0-0 | |
| 8 March 2012 | Standard Liège | Europa League | Round of 16 | Leg 1, Home | (Germany) Hannover 96 | Stade Maurice Dufrasne, Liège | 2-2 | Buyens, Tchité |
| 15 March 2012 | Standard Liège | Europa League | Round of 16 | Leg 2, Away | (Germany) Hannover 96 | AWD-Arena, Hanover | 4-0 | |

== Other honours ==
| Competition | Winner |
|---|---|
| Cup | Lokeren |
| Supercup | |
| Third division A | Mouscron-Péruwelz |
| Third division B | Dessel Sport |
| Promotion A | Izegem |
| Promotion B | Berchem |
| Promotion C | Cappellen |
| Promotion D | Ciney |

== European qualification for 2012-13 summary ==
| Competition | Qualifiers | Reason for Qualification |
|---|---|---|
| UEFA Champions League Third Qualifying Round for Champions | Anderlecht | 1st in Jupiler League |
| UEFA Champions League Third Qualifying Round for Non-Champions | Club Brugge | 2nd in Jupiler League |
| UEFA Europa League Play-off Round | Lokeren | Cup winner |
| UEFA Europa League Third Qualifying Round | Genk | 3rd in Jupiler League |
| UEFA Europa League Second Qualifying Round | Gent | Europa League Playoff winner |

== See also ==
- 2011–12 Belgian Pro League
- 2011–12 Belgian Cup
- 2012 Belgian Super Cup
- Belgian Second Division
- Belgian Third Division: divisions A and B
- Belgian Promotion: divisions A, B, C and D
