= Eleni Markou =

Greek footballer

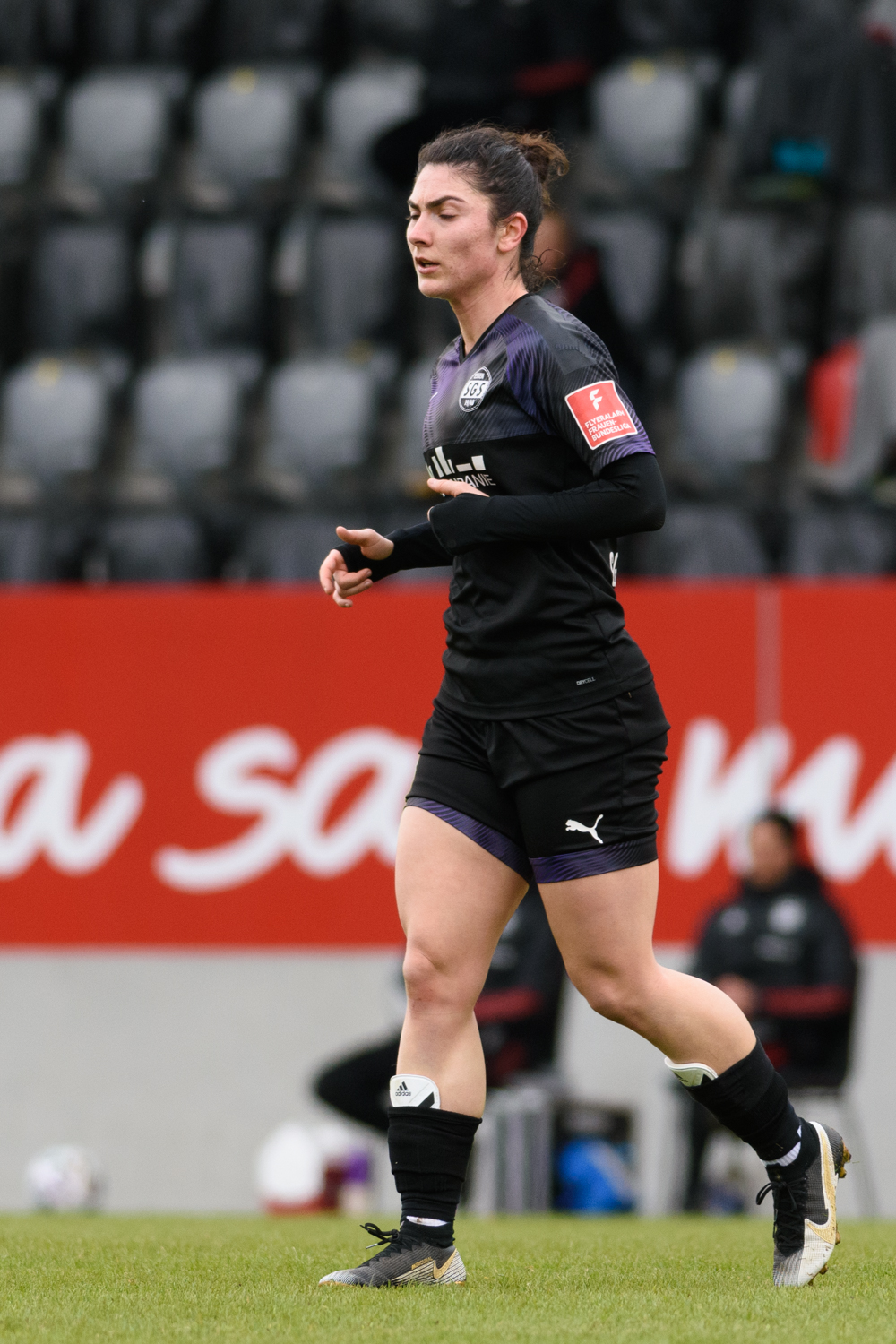

Personal information
- Full name: Eleni Markou
- Date of birth: 29 March 1995 (age 31)
- Place of birth: Kastoria, Greece
- Height: 1.71 m (5 ft 7 in)
- Position: Defensive midfielder

Team information
- Current team: Galatasaray
- Number: 11

College career
| Years | Team | Apps | (Gls) |
| 2016 | Monroe Community College | 19 | (29) |

Senior career*
| Years | Team | Apps | (Gls) |
| 2012–2018 | PAOK | | |
| 2018–2020 | Apollon Ladies | 34 | (47) |
| 2020–2021 | SGS Essen | 19 | (2) |
| 2021–2022 | Basel | 21 | (4) |
| 2022–2023 | Zürich | 11 | (0) |
| 2023–2024 | Basel | 14 | (0) |
| 2024–2025 | Union Berlin | 23 | (3) |
| 2025–2026 | Eintracht Frankfurt | 7 | (0) |
| 2026– | Galatasaray | 9 | (2) |

International career^{‡}
| 2012–2013 | Greece U19 | 9 | (1) |
| 2014– | Greece | 75 | (10) |
- * Club domestic league appearances and goals as of 21 November 2026 ‡ National team caps and goals as of 3 March 2026

Eleni Markou (born 29 March 1995) is a Greek professional footballer who plays as a defensive midfielder for Turkish Super League club Galatasaray and the Greece national team, whom she captains.

== International goals ==
| No. | Date | Venue | Opponent | Score | Result | Competition |
|---|---|---|---|---|---|---|
| 1. | 12 March 2015 | Peyia Municipal Stadium, Pegeia, Cyprus | Lebanon | | 14–0 | Aphrodite Women Cup |
| 2. | 15 March 2015 | Peyia Municipal Stadium, Pegeia, Cyprus | Latvia | | 4–1 | Aphrodite Women Cup |
| 3. | 22 October 2015 | Loni Papuçiu Stadium, Fier, Albania | Albania | 4–1 | 4–1 | UEFA Women's Euro 2017 qualifying |
| 4. | 25 November 2016 | Komotini Municipal Stadium, Komotini, Greece | Cyprus | 5–1 | 5–1 | Friendly |
| 5. | 8 April 2017 | Selman Stërmasi Stadium, Tirana, Albania | Kosovo | 1–0 | 6–0 | 2019 FIFA Women's World Cup qualification |
| 6. | 11 October 2020 | Leoforos Alexandras Stadium, Athens, Greece | Montenegro | 1–0 | 1–0 | UEFA Women's Euro 2022 qualifying |
| 7. | 22 September 2023 | Georgios Kamaras Stadium, Athens, Greece | Poland | 1–1 | 1–3 | 2023–24 UEFA Women's Nations League |
| 8. | 27 October 2023 | Theodoros Vardinogiannis Stadium, Heraklion, Greece | Ukraine | 1–1 | 2–1 | 2023–24 UEFA Women's Nations League |
| 9. | 31 May 2024 | Theodoros Vardinogiannis Stadium, Heraklion, Greece | Montenegro | 1–1 | 2–2 | UEFA Women's Euro 2025 qualifying |
| 10. | 3 March 2026 | Theodoros Vardinogiannis Stadium, Heraklion, Greece | Georgia | 1–0 | 3–0 | 2027 FIFA Women's World Cup qualification |

== Honours ==
=== Club ===
PAOK

- Greek A Division (5): 2012/13, 2014/15, 2015/16, 2016/17, 2017/18
- Greek Cup (5): 2013, 2014, 2015, 2016, 2017

Monroe Community College

- NJCAA Region III Division I: 2016

Apollon

- Cypriot First Division (1): 2018/19

Zürich

- Swiss Super League (1): 2022/23

Union Berlin

- 2. Frauen-Bundesliga (1): 2024/25

=== Individual ===
- WNYAC Co-Freshman Female Athlete of the Year: 2016
- NJCAA Region III Player of the Year: 2016
- NSCAA National Player of the Year: 2016
- NJCAA Division I Women's Soccer First-Team All-American: 2016
- NSCAA Junior College Division I Women's First-Team All-American: 2016
