= Hege Hansen =

Norwegian footballer (born 1990)

Personal information
- Date of birth: 24 October 1990 (age 36)
- Place of birth: Norway
- Height: 1.60 m (5 ft 3 in)
- Position: Forward

Youth career
- Bryne

Senior career*
Years	Team	Apps	(Gls)
2006–2010	Klepp	60	(14)
2010–2014	Arna-Bjørnar	100	(49)
2015	Klepp	20	(13)
2016	Avaldsnes	17	(4)
2017–2022	Klepp	80	(24)

International career^{‡}
2005–2007	Norway U17	16	(6)
2006–2009	Norway U19	27	(9)
2008	Norway U20	1	(0)
2009–2013	Norway U23	23	(5)
2012–2017	Norway	13	(4)
- * Club domestic league appearances and goals as of 10:02, 14 June 2022 (UTC) ‡ National team caps and goals as of 10:02, 14 June 2022 (UTC)

Hege Hansen (born 24 October 1990) is a Norwegian former footballer who played as a forward.

== Career ==
Hansen played from 2006 to 2010 for the Toppserien club Klepp IL. In August 2010, she switched to Arna-Bjørnar and her first match for new club, was against her old club. After five seasons, she returned to Klepp IL for 2015 season.

== International career ==
Hansen was in several Norwegian junior teams. In autumn 2007, she was part of the U-19 team that qualified and reached the final in the 2008 UEFA Women's Under-19 Championship in France. They were runners-up, after losing to Italy, for the minimum score, 1:0. She also participated in the team that played the 2009 UEFA Women's Under-19 Championship. Norway qualified for the final tournament, but was unable to surpass the group stage and only scored once. In February 2009, she played two matches for the U-23 team in La Manga, Spain. Three years later, on 17 January 2012 – also in La Manga – she played her first game for the senior team. On 14 May 2015, she was nominated for the final squad for the 2015 FIFA Women's World Cup.

== International goals ==
No.	Date	Venue	Opponent	Score	Result	Competition
1.	31 March 2012	Lovech Stadium, Lovech, Bulgaria	Bulgaria	2–0	3–0	UEFA Women's Euro 2013 qualifying
2.	31 March 2012	Lovech Stadium, Lovech, Bulgaria	Bulgaria	3–0	3–0	UEFA Women's Euro 2013 qualifying
3.	4 April 2012	Széktói Stadion, Kecskemét, Hungary	Hungary	3–0	5–0	UEFA Women's Euro 2013 qualifying
4.	4 April 2012	Széktói Stadion, Kecskemét, Hungary	Hungary	4–0	5–0	UEFA Women's Euro 2013 qualifying

== Family ==
Her father Hugo Hansen and her brother Cato Hansen were both professional footballers. Her sister, Tuva Hansen, is also a professional footballer.
