= UEFA Women's Euro 2013 qualifying =

Football tournament qualifying matches

The Qualifying rounds for the UEFA Women's Euro 2013 determined which 11 teams joined Sweden, the hosts of the 2013 tournament, to play for the UEFA Women's Championship.

== Tie breakers ==
If two or more teams are tied in points the tie breakers are in ascending order:

1. Points in matches between tied teams
2. superior goal difference in matches between tied teams
3. higher number of goals scored in matches between tied teams
4. higher number of goals scored away from home in matches between tied teams (not to be used in preliminary round ties)

If the number of tied teams is reduced now, tie breakers 1 to 4 are applied again to the still tied teams. Only then the next tie breakers are used

1. superior goal difference in all matches
2. higher number of goals scored in all matches
3. position in the UEFA women’s national team coefficient ranking used for the group stage draw
4. higher number of goals scored away from home in all matches (not to be used in preliminary round ties)

== Preliminary round ==
Eight teams were divided into two groups of four. The two group winners qualified for the actual qualification round. The draw took place on 3 December 2010. The games were played from 3 to 8 March 2011. The hosts of the two one-venue preliminary round groups are indicated below in italics.

=== Group 1 ===
Team	Pld	W	D	L	GF	GA	GD	Pts
Macedonia	3	2	1	0	7	2	+5	7
Lithuania	3	1	1	1	5	3	+2	4
Luxembourg	3	1	0	2	4	9	−5	3
Latvia	3	1	0	2	1	3	−2	3

Source: UEFA.com

3 March 2011
13:00

Lithuania	1–1	Macedonia
Budrytė 71'	Report	Andonova 21'

Stadion Mladost, Strumica
Attendance: 70
Referee: Simona Ghisletta (Switzerland)
3 March 2011
13:00

Luxembourg	2–0	Latvia
Settanni 60' (pen.); Berscheid 70'	Report

Stadion Kukuš, Strumica
Attendance: 15
Referee: Marija Margareta Damjanovic (Croatia)

5 March 2011
13:00

Luxembourg	1–5	Macedonia
Settanni 82'	Report	Andonova 21', 62'; Brahimi 24'; Salihi 59'; Rochi 90+3'

Stadion Mladost, Strumica
Attendance: 75
Referee: Simona Ghisletta (Switzerland)
5 March 2011
13:00

Latvia	1–0	Lithuania
Sokolova 13'	Report

Stadion Kukuš, Strumica
Attendance: 30
Referee: Ivana Projkovska (Macedonia)

8 March 2011
13:00

Lithuania	4–1	Luxembourg
Imanalijeva 45+2', 85'; Vanagaitė 48'; Stasiulytė 59'	Report	Thompson 65'

Stadion Mladost, Strumica
Attendance: 20
Referee: Marija Margareta Damjanovic (Croatia)
8 March 2011
13:00

Macedonia	1–0	Latvia
Rochi 31'	Report

Stadion Kukuš, Strumica
Attendance: 100
Referee: Sabine Bonnin (France)

=== Group 2 ===
Team	Pld	W	D	L	GF	GA	GD	Pts
Armenia	3	1	2	0	2	1	+1	5
Malta	3	1	1	1	2	3	−1	4
Georgia	3	1	1	1	1	1	0	4
Faroe Islands	3	1	0	2	2	2	0	3

Source: UEFA.com

3 March 2011
11:00

Georgia	0–1	Malta
	Report	D'Agostino 90+1'

Ta' Qali National Stadium, Ta' Qali
Attendance: 220
Referee: Pernilla Larsson (Sweden)
3 March 2011
14:00

Faroe Islands	0–1	Armenia
	Report	Kostanyan 8'

Ta' Qali National Stadium, Ta' Qali
Attendance: 30
Referee: Sjoukje de Jong (Netherlands)

5 March 2011
11:00

Armenia	0–0	Georgia
	Report

Ta' Qali National Stadium, Ta' Qali
Attendance: 30
Referee: Pernilla Larsson (Sweden)
5 March 2011
14:00

Faroe Islands	2–0	Malta
Josephsen 26'; O. Hansen 86'	Report

Ta' Qali National Stadium, Ta' Qali
Attendance: 250
Referee: Lilach Asulin (Israel)

8 March 2011
11:00

Georgia	1–0	Faroe Islands
Chichinadze 90+5'	Report

Ta' Qali National Stadium, Ta' Qali
Attendance: 20
Referee: Lilach Asulin (Israel)
8 March 2011
14:00

Malta	1–1	Armenia
Cuschieri 14'	Report	Mangasaryan 64'

Ta' Qali National Stadium, Ta' Qali
Attendance: 250
Referee: Sjoukje de Jong (Netherlands)

== Qualification round ==
The two winners of the preliminary round would join the 36 top ranked nations, with the exception of already qualified Sweden, and play in four groups of five teams and three of six teams. The group winners and the best ranked runner-up qualified for the final tournament. The other six runners-up would play three two-legged playoffs with those winners also advancing to the final tournament. This stage ran from September 2011 to September 2012.

=== Seeding ===
Pot A	Pot B	Pot C	Pot D	Pot E
Germany (Holder); Norway; England; France; Italy; Denmark; Finland	Russia; Netherlands; Iceland; Spain; Ukraine; Scotland; Czech Republic	Switzerland; Poland; Republic of Ireland; Austria; Belgium; Belarus; Slovenia	Hungary; Serbia; Portugal; Greece; Slovakia; Romania; Wales	Bulgaria; Northern Ireland; Turkey; Israel; Estonia; Croatia; Kazakhstan; Bosnia and Herzegovina; Armenia; Macedonia

As the Bosnia and Herzegovina Football Federation (NFSBiH) were at risk of suspension from FIFA, Bosnia and Herzegovina were automatically drawn in sixth position in Group 1 in order to avoid the possibility of a five-team group being reduced to four. The draw was made on March 14, 2011.

=== Group 1 ===
Team	Pld	W	D	L	GF	GA	GD	Pts
Italy	10	9	1	0	35	0	+35	28
Russia	10	7	1	2	31	6	+25	22
Poland	10	5	2	3	17	11	+6	17
Bosnia and Herzegovina	10	3	1	6	12	21	−9	10
Greece	10	0	5	5	7	20	−13	5
Macedonia	10	0	2	8	5	49	−44	2

Source: UEFA.com

	(Bosnia and Herzegovina)	(Greece)	(Italy)	(North Macedonia)	(Poland)	(Russia)
Bosnia and Herzegovina	–	1–1	0–1	1–0	0–2	0–1
Greece	2–3	–	0–0	2–2	1–1	0–4
Italy	4–0	2–0	–	9–0	1–0	2–0
Macedonia	2–6	1–1	0–9	–	0–3	0–6
Poland	4–0	2–0	0–5	4–0	–	0–3
Russia	4–1	4–0	0–2	8–0	1–1	–

- The Poland–Russia match ended 0–2 originally but was awarded a 3–0 win for Russia by the UEFA.

=== Group 2 ===
Team	Pld	W	D	L	GF	GA	GD	Pts
Germany	10	9	1	0	64	3	+61	28
Spain	10	6	2	2	43	14	+29	20
Romania	10	5	1	4	20	20	0	16
Switzerland	10	5	0	5	29	24	+5	15
Kazakhstan	10	2	1	7	4	55	−51	7
Turkey	10	0	1	9	4	48	−44	1

Source: UEFA.com

	(Germany)	(Kazakhstan)	(Romania)	(Spain)	(Switzerland)	(Turkey)
Germany	–	17–0	5–0	5–0	4–1	10–0
Kazakhstan	0–7	–	0–3	0–4	1–0	2–0
Romania	0–3	3–0	–	0–4	4–2	7–1
Spain	2–2	13–0	0–0	–	3–2	4–0
Switzerland	0–6	8–1	4–1	4–3	–	5–0
Turkey	0–5	0–0	1–2	1–10	1–3	–

Spain's María Paz Vilas set a new competition record when she scored seven goals against Kazakhstan.

=== Group 3 ===
Team	Pld	W	D	L	GF	GA	GD	Pts
Norway	10	8	0	2	35	9	+26	24
Iceland	10	7	1	2	28	4	+24	22
Belgium	10	6	2	2	18	8	+10	20
Northern Ireland	10	3	2	5	12	15	−3	11
Hungary	10	3	1	6	18	22	−4	10
Bulgaria	10	0	0	10	1	54	−53	0

Source: UEFA.com

	(Belgium)	(Bulgaria)	(Hungary)	(Iceland)	(Northern Ireland)	(Norway)
Belgium	–	5–0	2–1	1–0	2–2	0–1
Bulgaria	0–1	–	0–4	0–10	0–1	0–3
Hungary	1–3	9–0	–	0–1	2–2	0–5
Iceland	0–0	6–0	3–0	–	2–0	3–1
Northern Ireland	0–2	4–1	0–1	0–2	–	3–1
Norway	3–2	11–0	6–0	2–1	2–0	–

=== Group 4 ===
Team	Pld	W	D	L	GF	GA	GD	Pts
France	8	8	0	0	32	2	+30	24
Scotland	8	5	1	2	21	12	+9	16
Wales	8	3	1	4	12	14	−2	10
Republic of Ireland	8	3	0	5	8	11	−3	9
Israel	8	0	0	8	1	35	−34	0

Source: UEFA.com

	(France)	(Israel)	(Republic of Ireland)	(Scotland)	(Wales)
France	–	5–0	4–0	2–0	4–0
Israel	0–5	–	0–2	1–6	0–2
Republic of Ireland	1–3	2–0	–	0–1	0–1
Scotland	0–5	8–0	2–1	–	2–2
Wales	1–4	5–0	0–2	1–2	–

=== Group 5 ===
Team	Pld	W	D	L	GF	GA	GD	Pts
Finland	8	6	1	1	22	4	+18	19
Ukraine	8	5	1	2	18	4	+14	16
Belarus	8	4	1	3	10	17	−7	13
Slovakia	8	3	1	4	8	7	+1	10
Estonia	8	0	0	8	5	31	−26	0

Source: UEFA.com

	(Belarus)	(Estonia)	(Finland)	(Slovakia)	(Ukraine)
Belarus	–	2–1	2–2	1–0	0–5
Estonia	2–4	–	0–5	0–2	1–4
Finland	4–0	6–0	–	2–0	0–1
Slovakia	3–0	3–1	0–1	–	0–2
Ukraine	0–1	5–0	1–2	0–0	–

=== Group 6 ===
Team	Pld	W	D	L	GF	GA	GD	Pts
England	8	6	2	0	22	2	+20	20
Netherlands	8	6	1	1	20	2	+18	19
Serbia	8	4	1	3	15	18	−3	13
Slovenia	8	1	1	6	6	21	−15	4
Croatia	8	0	1	7	6	26	−20	1

Source: UEFA.com

	(Croatia)	(England)	(Netherlands)	(Serbia)	(Slovenia)
Croatia	–	0–6	0–3	1–4	3–3
England	3–0	–	1–0	2–0	4–0
Netherlands	2–0	0–0	–	6–0	3–1
Serbia	4–2	2–2	0–4	–	3–0
Slovenia	1–0	0–4	0–2	1–2	–

=== Group 7 ===
Team	Pld	W	D	L	GF	GA	GD	Pts
Denmark	8	7	0	1	28	3	+25	21
Austria	8	6	1	1	16	9	+7	19
Czech Republic	8	4	1	3	16	9	+7	13
Portugal	8	2	0	6	16	13	+3	6
Armenia	8	0	0	8	2	44	−42	0

Source: UEFA.com

	(Armenia)	(Austria)	(Czech Republic)	(Denmark)	(Portugal)
Armenia	–	2–4	0–2	0–5	0–8
Austria	3–0	–	1–1	3–1	1–0
Czech Republic	5–0	2–3	–	0–2	1–0
Denmark	11–0	3–0	1–0	–	2–0
Portugal	6–0	0–1	2–5	0–3	–

=== Ranking of second-placed teams ===
The highest ranked second placed team from the groups qualified automatically for the tournament, while the remainder entered the play-offs. As some groups contained six teams and some five, matches against the sixth-placed team in each group were not included in this ranking. As a result, a total of eight matches played by each team counted toward the purpose of the second-placed ranking table. The Netherlands finished as best runners-up.

Grp	Team	Pld	W	D	L	GF	GA	GD	Pts
6	Netherlands		6	1	1	20	2	+18	19
7	Austria		6	1	1	16	9	+7	19
5	Ukraine		5	1	2	18	4	+14	16
1	Russia		5	1	2	17	6	+11	16
4	Scotland		5	1	2	21	12	+9	16
3	Iceland		5	1	2	12	4	+8	16
2	Spain		4	2	2	29	13	+16	14

== Play-off round ==
The six teams advancing as runners-up were drawn against each other to qualify three team through a two legged play-off. The three nations with the highest UEFA coefficients were seeded and played their second leg at home. The draw took place on Friday, 21 September 2012, at 12:45 local time at the UEFA headquarters in Nyon, Switzerland.

The seeded teams were Iceland, Russia and Spain.

Team 1	Agg.	Team 2	1st leg	2nd leg
Scotland	3–4	Spain	1–1	2–3 (a.e.t.)
Ukraine	4–6	Iceland	2–3	2–3
Austria	1–3	Russia	0–2	1–1

=== First leg ===
20 October 2012
15:00

Scotland	1–1	Spain
Little 26' (pen.)	Report	Adriana 30'

Hampden Park, Glasgow
Attendance: 4,058
Referee: Esther Staubli (Switzerland)

20 October 2012
15:00

Ukraine	2–3	Iceland
Romanenko 39'; Chorna 51'	Report	Ómarsdóttir 5'; Magnúsdóttir 25'; Viðarsdóttir 64'

Sport Complex, Sevastopol
Attendance: 1,000
Referee: Kirsi Heikkinen (Finland)

21 October 2012
18:30

Austria	0–2	Russia
	Report	Savchenkova 25'; Shlyapina 43'

NV Arena, Sankt Pölten
Attendance: 3,600
Referee: Jenny Palmqvist (Sweden)

=== Second leg ===
24 October 2012
18:00

Spain	3–2 (a.e.t.)	Scotland
Adriana 74'; Meseguer 113'; Boquete 120+2'	Report	Mitchell 62'; Little 98'

La Ciudad del Fútbol, Madrid
Attendance: 800
Referee: Bibiana Steinhaus (Germany)

Spain won 4–3 on aggregate.

25 October 2012
17:00

Russia	1–1	Austria
Kostyukova 30'	Report	Puntigam 75'

Olimp – 2, Rostov-on-Don
Attendance: 5,000
Referee: Efthalia Mitsi (Greece)

Russia won 3–1 on aggregate.

25 October 2012
20:30

Iceland	3–2	Ukraine
Viðarsdóttir 8'; Ómarsdóttir 12'; Brynjarsdóttir 76'	Report	Dyatel 36'; Apanaschenko 72'

Laugardalsvöllur, Reykjavík
Attendance: 6,647
Referee: Teodora Albon (Romania)

Iceland won 6–4 on aggregate.

== Top goalscorers ==
The top scorers in UEFA Women's Euro 2013 qualifying are as follows:

Rank	Name	Goals	Minutes played
1	(Germany) Célia Šašić	17	532'
2	(Switzerland) Ramona Bachmann	11	848'
3	(Spain) María Paz Vilas	10	269'
3	(Spain) Verónica Boquete	10	799'
5	(Italy) Patrizia Panico	9	593'
5	(Norway) Isabell Herlovsen	9	630'
5	(Denmark) Pernille Harder	9	720'
5	(Iceland) Margrét Lára Viðarsdóttir	9	824'
9	(Germany) Alexandra Popp	8	473'
9	(Netherlands) Manon Melis	8	540'
9	(Poland) Anna Żelazko	8	627'
