= Moira Murić =

Bosnian footballer (born 1985)

Personal information
- Full name: Moira Murić
- Date of birth: 19 October 1985 (age 41)
- Place of birth: SFR Yugoslavia
- Position: Striker

Senior career*
Years	Team	Apps	(Gls)
2006–2008	Olimpija Ljubljana		
2008–2009	Senožeti		
2009–	Rudar Škale		

International career
2011–	Bosnia and Herzegovina	5	(1)
- * Club domestic league appearances and goals

Moira Murić is a Bosnian football forward currently playing for Rudar Škale in Slovenia's SŽNL. She previously played for Olimpija Ljubljana and ŽNK Senožeti.

She made her official debut for the Bosnian national team in November 2011, in the 2013 European Championship qualifiers. She scored her first goal three months later in a 2–3 win on Greece.
