= Sofia Inguanta =

Greek footballer

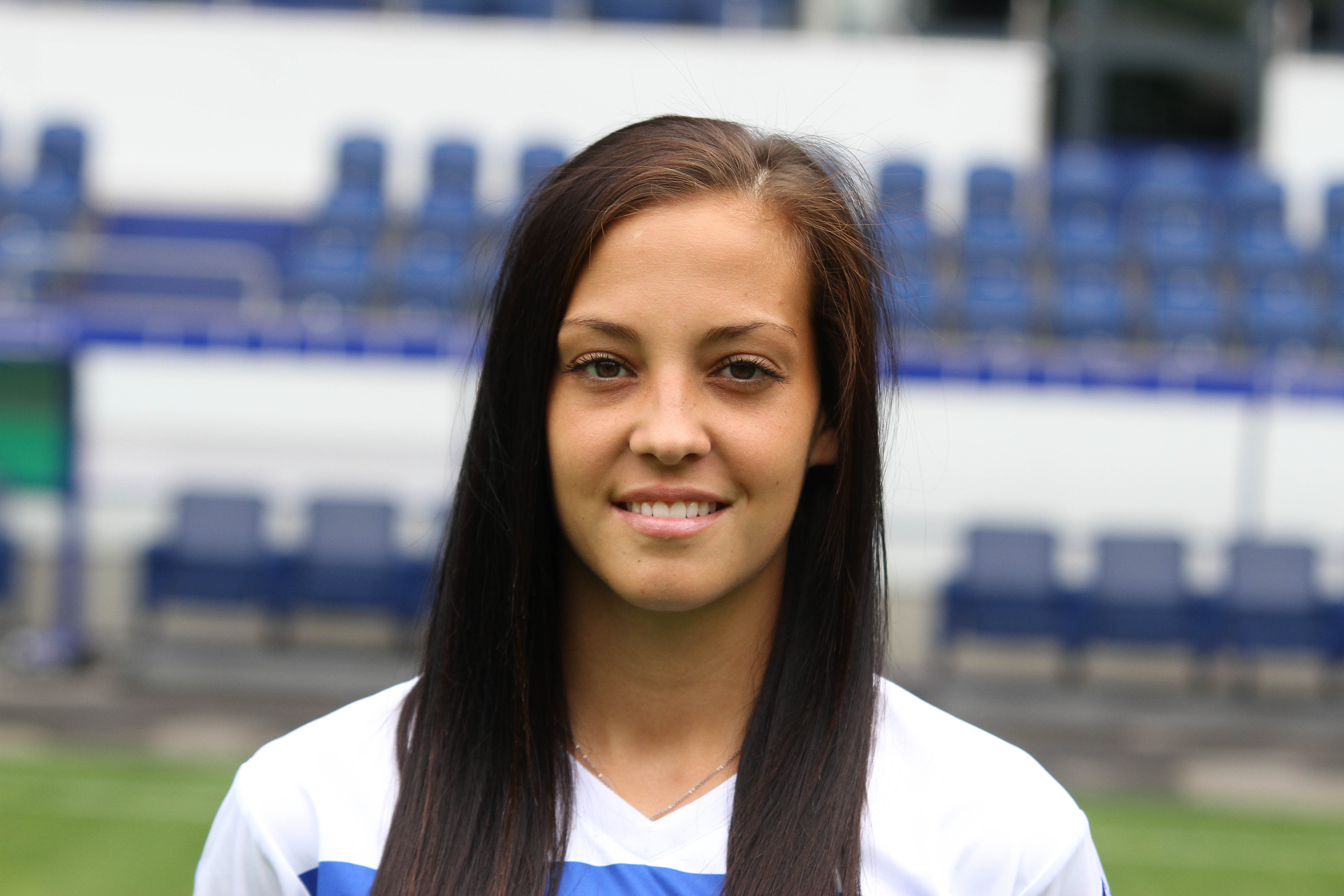
- Inguanta in 2014

Personal information
- Birth name: Sofia Nati
- Date of birth: 19 April 1993 (age 33)
- Place of birth: Oberhausen, Germany
- Height: 1.64 m (5 ft 5 in)
- Position: Forward

Team information
- Current team: Karlsruher SC

Senior career*
Years	Team	Apps	(Gls)
2008–2011	SGS Essen	33	(9)
2011–2013	SC 07 Bad Neuenahr	17	(1)
2013–2017	MSV Duisburg	74	(35)
2018	PSV	9	(2)
2019	Werder Bremen	4	(3)
2021–2022	Karlsruher SC		

International career^{‡}
2011	Germany U19		
2016–	Greece		
- * Club domestic league appearances and goals as of 1 July 2019 ‡ National team caps and goals as of 19:22, 30 August 2019 (UTC)

Sofia Inguanta (née Nati; born 19 April 1993) is a footballer who played as a forward. Born in Germany, she represents Greece at international level.

== Career ==
Inguanta has been capped for the Greece national team, appearing for the team during the 2019 FIFA Women's World Cup qualifying cycle.

She joined Frauen-Bundesliga club Werder Bremen in January 2019 from PSV. She scored three goals in four league matches before sustaining a cruciate ligament tear in March, ending her season.
