= Christina Kokoviadou =

Greek footballer

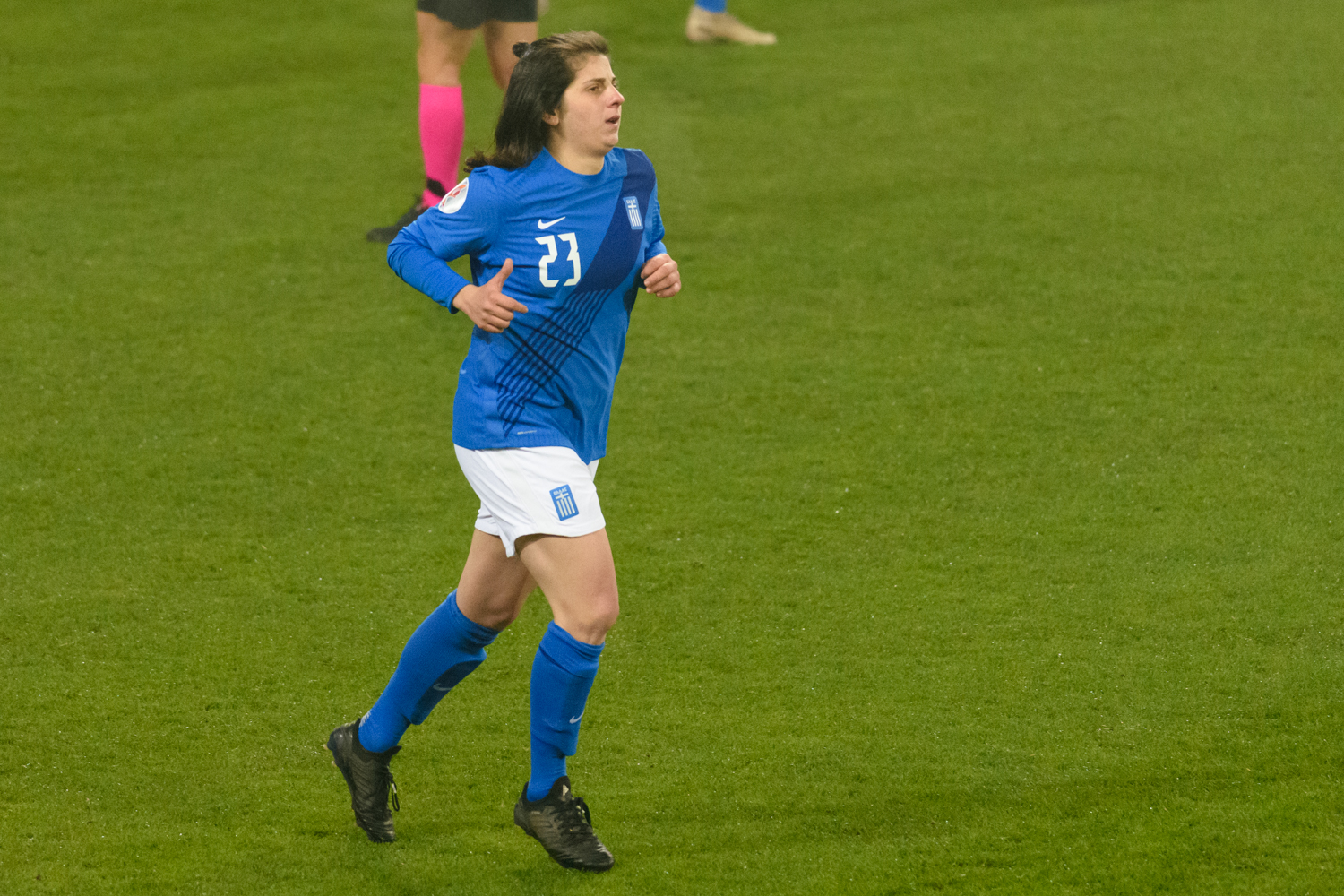

Personal information
- Full name: Christina Kokoviadou
- Date of birth: 14 May 1994 (age 32)
- Place of birth: Ptolemaida, Greece
- Position: Midfielder

Team information
- Current team: Aris Thessaloniki WFC

Youth career
- 2008: Neufahrn
- 2008–2010: Moos-Eittingermoos

Senior career*
Years	Team	Apps	(Gls)
2010–2014	Wacker München	63	(26)
2014	BSC Marzahn	10	(8)
2014–2015	Amazones Dramas		
2015–2016	Anorthosis Famagusta		
2016–2017	Amazones Dramas		
2017–2022	Aris Thessalonikis		
2022–2023	Trikala	5	(1)
2023–	Aris Thessalonikis		

International career^{‡}
2011–2013	Greece U19	9	(5)
2014–	Greece	21	(7)
- * Club domestic league appearances and goals ‡ National team caps and goals as of 18:58, 3 April 2015 (UTC)

Christina Kokoviadou (born 14 May 1994) is a Greek football midfielder who currently plays for Aris Thessaloniki in the Greek B Division.
