= Ashley Hutton =

Northern Ireland footballer (born 1987)

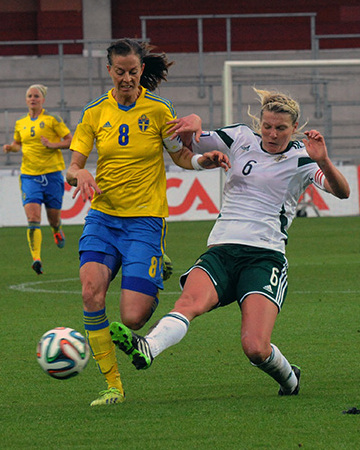
- Hutton (right) in 2014

Personal information
- Full name: Ashley Hutton
- Date of birth: 2 November 1987 (age 39)
- Height: 1.74 m (5 ft 9 in)
- Position: Defender

Team information
- Current team: Linfield
- Number: 5

Senior career*
Years	Team	Apps	(Gls)
- Crusaders Strikers
2012–	Linfield		

International career^{‡}
2005–	Northern Ireland	114	(9)
- * Club domestic league appearances and goals as of 19:22, 30 August 2019 (UTC) ‡ National team caps and goals as of 22:55, 13 July 2022 (UTC)

Ashley Hutton (born 2 November 1987) is a Northern Irish footballer who plays as a defender for Linfield and has appeared for the Northern Ireland women's national team.

== International career ==
Hutton has been capped for the Northern Ireland national team, appearing for the team during the 2019 FIFA Women's World Cup qualifying cycle.

On 3 September 2019, Hutton played her 100th match for Northern Ireland against Wales.

Hutton was part of the squad that was called up to the UEFA Women's Euro 2022.
