= Audrey Demoustier =

Belgian football midfielder

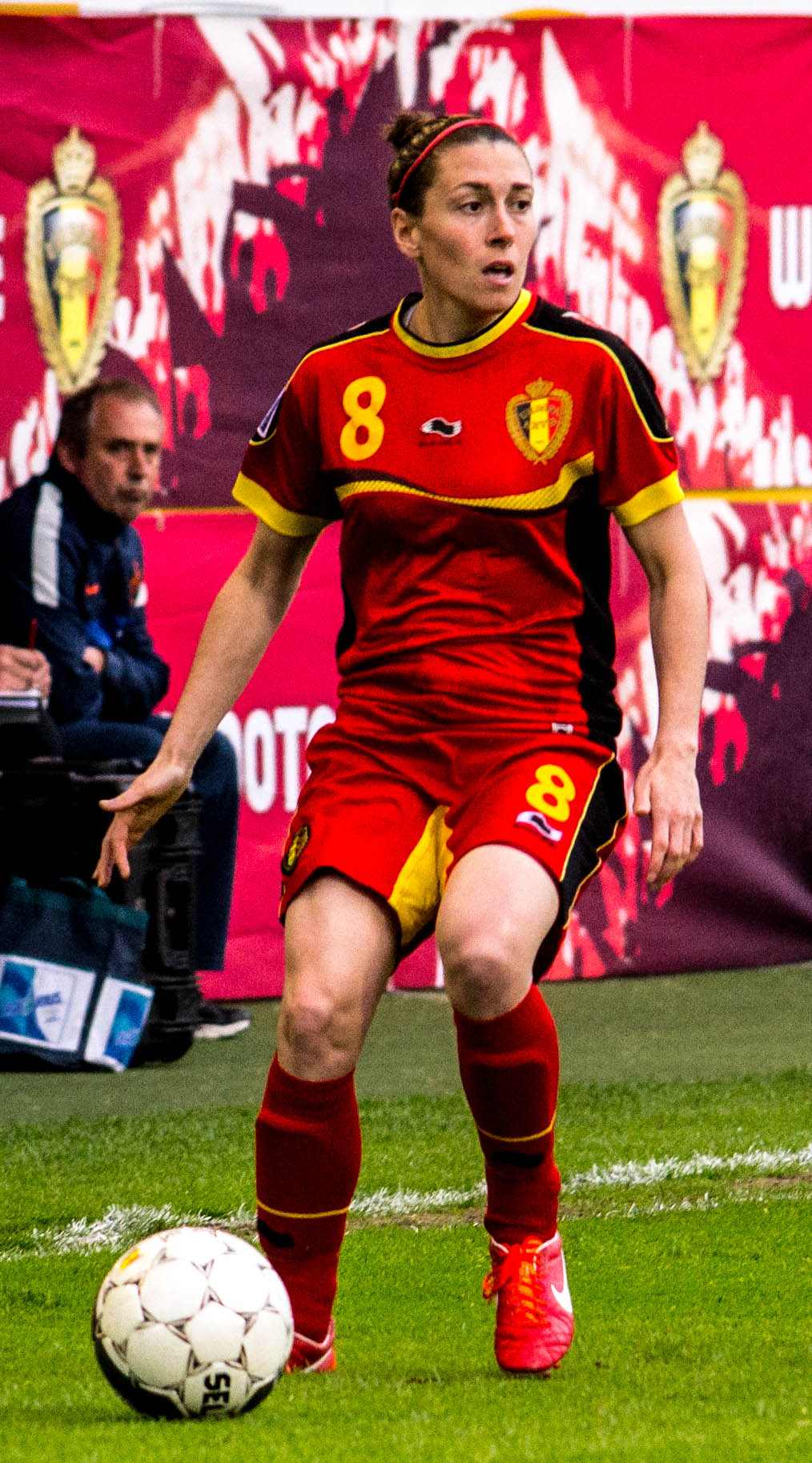
- Demoustier in 2014

Personal information
- Full name: Audrey Demoustier
- Date of birth: 17 March 1985 (age 41)
- Place of birth: Chimay, Belgium
- Position: Midfielder

Team information
- Current team: Standard Liège
- Number: 8

Senior career*
Years	Team	Apps	(Gls)
2000–2006	FCF Braine-Rebecq		
2006–2008	White Star Woluwe		
2008–2016	Standard Liège		
2016–	White Star Woluwe	23	(0)

International career^{‡}
2001–2002	Belgium U17	2	(0)
2002–2004	Belgium U19	15	(2)
2007–2015	Belgium	40	(4)
- * Club domestic league appearances and goals ‡ National team caps and goals as of 30 November 2015

Audrey Demoustier (born 17 March 1985) is a Belgian football midfielder, currently playing for White Star Woluwe of the First Division.

She is a former member of the Belgian national team.

== Biography ==
Demoustier started here senior career at FCF Braine where she played for 5 seasons. She left Braine for White Star Woluwe where she only stayed for 2 seasons. She left Woluwe for Standard Liège where she played until 2016. With standard she played Champions league, promoted to the BeNe League and, when the BeNe League was disbanded, the Super League. In 2016 she left Standard for again Woluwe that now plays in the First Division.

=== Champions League ===
Demoustier played with Standard Liège for 13 Champions League games. In the six times she competed, only one time was the team unable to participate in the main tournament. They did not get past the qualification round as they lost the first game, 1–3, against Minsk. They did better in the second game and won, 11–0, against ŽFK Dragon 2014. But in the last game they couldn't get any further than a 1–1 draw against ŽNK Osijek.

=== BeNe League ===
When the BeNe League first saw light at the start of season 2012–13, Standard Liège was there from start until the end at season 2014–15. Demoustier played in those 3 seasons a total of 57 games for a total of 3946 minutes and scored 11 goals.

=== Super League ===
In her last season for Standard Liège she played the Super League level. She made 12 appearances for a total of 861 minutes and scored 3 goals.

== Statistics ==
=== Club ===
Champions League
Year	Club	Apps	Goals	Minutes
2009-10	Standard Luik	2	0	159
2011-12	Standard Luik	2	1	180
2012-13	Standard Luik	2	0	180
2013-14	Standard Luik	2	0	174
2014-15	Standard Luik	2	0	107
2015-16	Standard Luik	3	0	180
Total		13	1	980

BeNe League
Year	Club	Apps	Goals	Minutes
2012-13	Standard Luik	24	4	1857
2013-14	Standard Luik	25	5	1973
2014-15	Standard Luik	8	2	116
Total		57	11	3946

Super League
Year	Club	Apps	Goals	Minutes
2015-16	Standard Luik	12	3	861
Total		12	3	861

=== International ===
==== Youth ====
Red Flames U17
Year	Apps	Goals	Minutes
2001	1	0	80
2002	1	0	52
Total	1	0	132

Red Flames U19
Year	Apps	Goals	Minutes
2002	3	0	34
2003	7	2	498
2004	5	0	406
Total	6	2	938

==== Seniors ====
Red Flames
Year	Apps	Goals	Minutes
2007	2	0	152
2008	3	0	126
2009	2	0	90
2010	2	0	106
2011	10	2	826
2012	8	1	631
2013	7	0	392
2014	4	0	248
2015	2	1	28
Total	40	4	2689

== Awards ==
- Belgium Champion (7):
  - 2008–09
  - 2010–11
  - 2011–12
  - 2012–13
  - 2013–14
  - 2014–15
  - 2015–16
- BeNe League Champion (1):
  - 2014–15
- Winner Belgian Cup (2):
  - 2011–12
  - 2013–14
- Runner-up Belgian Cup (1):
  - 2008–09
- Winner Belgian Super Cup (3):
  - 2008–09
  - 2010–11
  - 2011–12
- Winner BeNe Super Cup (2):
  - 2010–11
  - 2011-12
