= Marita Skammelsrud Lund =

Norwegian footballer (born 1989)

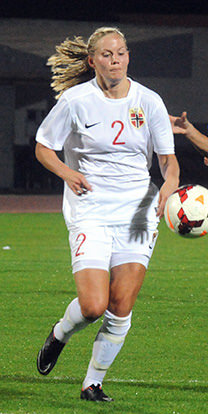

Personal information
- Date of birth: 29 January 1989 (age 37)
- Place of birth: Lørenskog, Norway
- Height: 1.73 m (5 ft 8 in)
- Positions: Defender; midfielder

Senior career*
Years	Team	Apps	(Gls)
- Lisleby FK
- Skogstrand
- Flyers and Vikings Singapore
2007–2016	LSK Kvinner FK	131	(10)

International career^{‡}
2005–2006	Norway U-17	13	(1)
2006–2008	Norway U-19	23	(2)
2008	Norway U-20	7	(1)
2010–2011	Norway U-23	4	(1)
2007–2016	Norway	81	(2)
Medal record
Women's football
Representing Norway
UEFA Women's Championship
Silver medal – second place	2013 Sweden	Team
- * Club domestic league appearances and goals as of 1 May 2015 ‡ National team caps and goals as of 23:02, 24 October 2016 (UTC)

Marita Skammelsrud Lund (born 29 January 1989) is a Norwegian former footballer. She began as a midfielder, but for the Norway women's national football team she plays at right back and at her club, LSK Kvinner FK, she usually plays as central midfield. Lund has previously played for Lisleby FK, Skogstrand and Flyers and Vikings Singapore. She lived in Singapore for four years from 1997 until 2001.

== Career ==
Lund has won 27 caps for Norway women's national football team, while scoring two goals. In October 2007 she was drafted into the senior squad for a match against Russia, aged 18, following an injury to Marit Fiane Christensen. Lund then played for Norway at the 2008 Summer Olympics in China. She also represented Norway in the 2011 FIFA Women's World Cup, where her pace and versatility were praised by the coach, and the 2015 FIFA Women's World Cup.

Marita Skammelsrud Lund is the niece of Bent Skammelsrud, former captain of Rosenborg BK.
