= Sandra Sałata =

Polish footballer

Personal information
- Full name: Sandra Sałata
- Birth name: Aleksandra Sałata
- Date of birth: 17 January 1991 (age 35)
- Place of birth: Ostrowiec Świętokrzyski, Poland
- Position: Defender

Youth career
- 2001–2005: KSZO Ostrowiec
- 2005–2008: Medyk Konin

Senior career*
Years	Team	Apps	(Gls)
2008–2013	Medyk Konin		
2013–2014	AZS UAM Poznań (indoor)		
2016–2022	Medyk Konin		

International career
- Poland U17
- Poland U19
2009–2018	Poland	34	(4)
- * Club domestic league appearances and goals

Aleksandra "Sandra" Sałata (born 17 January 1991) is a Polish former footballer who played as a defender. She made 34 appearances and scored four goals for the Poland national team.

== Career statistics ==
=== International ===
Appearances and goals by national team and year
National team	Year	Apps	Goals
Poland	2009	2	0
Poland	2010	3	0
Poland	2011	7	0
Poland	2012	7	3
Poland	2016	1	0
Poland	2017	9	1
Poland	2018	5	0
Total		34	4

== Honours ==
Medyk Konin

- Ekstraliga: 2016–17
- Polish Cup: 2012–13, 2016–17, 2018–19
