= Lidija Kuliš =

Bosnian footballer (born 1992)

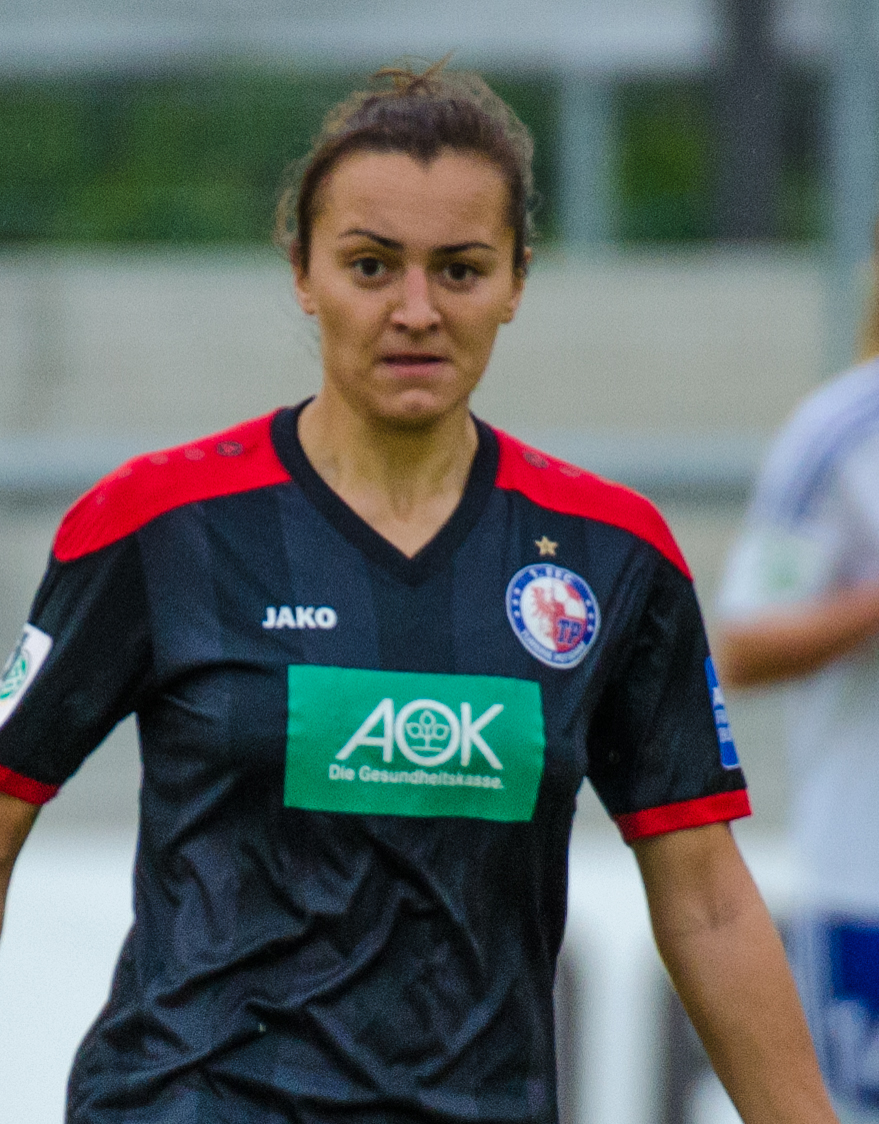

Personal information
- Date of birth: 2 May 1992 (age 34)
- Place of birth: Visoko, Bosnia and Herzegovina
- Height: 1.68 m (5 ft 6 in)
- Position: Striker

Team information
- Current team: Spartak Moscow
- Number: 23

Senior career*
| Years | Team | Apps | (Gls) |
| 2008–2011 | SFK 2000 | | |
| 2011–2018 | Turbine Potsdam II | 41 | (39) |
| 2011–2018 | Turbine Potsdam | 51 | (2) |
| 2013 | → Linköpings FC (loan) | 9 | (1) |
| 2018 | → FC Köln (loan) | 10 | (1) |
| 2018–2019 | Glasgow City | | |
| 2019–2021 | A.C. Milan | 7 | (0) |
| 2021–2022 | Ferencváros | | |
| 2022–2024 | Split | | |
| 2024 | Thór/KA | | |

International career
| 2008–2010 | Bosnia and Herzegovina U-19 | | |
| 2011– | Bosnia and Herzegovina | | |
- * Club domestic league appearances and goals

Lidija Kuliš (born 2 May 1992) is a Bosnian women's international footballer who plays as a striker for Abu Dhabi Country Club. While playing for Germany's Turbine Potsdam, she scored on debut in 2011. Kuliš previously played for Bosnian champions SFK Sarajevo, participating in three Champions League campaigns despite her young age.

In 2008, at 16, she was named female player of the year at Idol Nacije.

Kuliš left Potsdam on a loan transfer to Damallsvenskan club Linköpings FC in March 2013. She had played most of her football for Potsdam's second team in Germany, scoring 22 goals. Linköpings were in the market for a forward because Linda Sällström had suffered an anterior cruciate ligament injury.

In July 2018, Kuliš signed for Scottish champions Glasgow City.
