= Komotini Municipal Stadium =

Multi-purpose stadium in Komotini, Greece

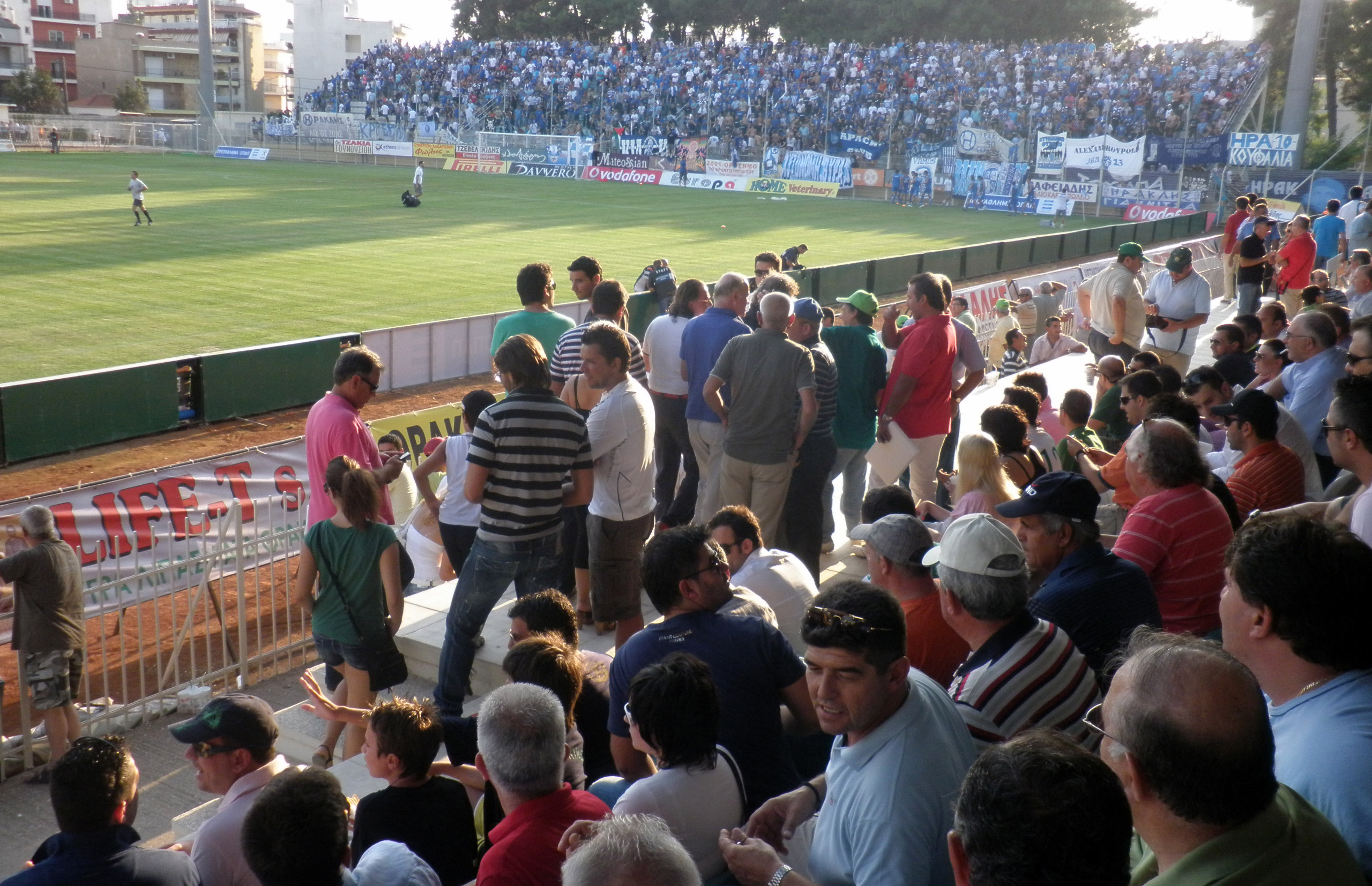
- Interactive map of Komotini Municipal Stadium
- Location: Komotini, Thrace, Greece
- Coordinates: 41°06′51″N 25°23′48″E
- Operator: Panthrakikos F.C.
- Capacity: 6,198
- Surface: Grass
- Field size: 105 x 68 m

Construction
- Built: 1922

Tenant
- Panthrakikos F.C.

The Municipal Athletic Centre of Komotini is a multi-purpose stadium in the administrative capital of North-eastern Greece, the city of Komotini.

== History ==
It was originally built in 1922/3, after the conquest of Western Thrace by the Greek Army. The Northern Stand was constructed in the 1950s. The smaller Southern Stand was built in the 1970s. The stadium remained in a state of disrepair until the 2000s and its capacity was 3,000.

In 2006, reconstruction of the Northern Stand took place. A partial roof was also added at the same time and as a result, most of its seats are now covered. The overall renovation, the addition of a Western Stand and super-bright flood lighting were undertaken in 2008. In 2009, the Eastern Stand was added and increased the total capacity to 6,700 seats. Underneath the Eastern Stand, up to 12 stores were pre-planned and were expected to be leased to private businesses. Plans for 2010 include further enlargement of the stadium and addition of VIP lounges.

== Present ==
It is currently used by the Greek Superleague side of Panthrakikos F.C. for football matches and has a capacity of 6,700 seats.
