= 2025 FC Rosengård season =

Rosengård
2025 season
- Head coach: Joel Kjetselberg (until 9 September 2025); Qvarmans Möller (from 9 September 2025)
- Stadium: Malmö IP, Kronborg
- Damallsvenskan: 11th
- Svenska Cupen: Group stage
- Champions League: Second qualifying round
- Europa Cup: Second qualifying round
- World Sevens: Group stage
- Top goalscorer: League: Emilia Larsson (6); All: Emilia Larsson (10)
- Highest home attendance: 4,654 v Malmö; Damallsvenskan; 8 August 2025
- Lowest home attendance: 437 v Norrköping; Damallsvenskan; 10 May 2025
- Average home league attendance: 882
- Biggest win: 3–0 v Linköping (A); Damallsvenskan; 14 June 2025
- Biggest defeat: 0–4 v Hammarby (A); Damallsvenskan; 14 April 2025
Home colours	Away colours

The 2025 season is FC Rosengård's 29th season in the Damallsvenskan, the top flight of women's football in Sweden. Alongside competing in the Damallsvenskan, Rosengård are also competing in the Svenska Cupen and in the qualifying rounds of the inaugural UEFA Women's Europa Cup (UWEC) after being knocked out of the UEFA Women's Champions League (UWCL) in the second qualifying round. The club also competed in the inaugural World Sevens Football, being eliminated in the group stage without earning a point or even scoring a single goal.

The season was Rosengård's worst ever league season in history. The club finished in 11th place with just 25 points, 20 points worse than their seventh place finish with 45 points in 2023 (their previous record low finish).

== Squad ==
As of 24 September 2025

Note: Flags indicate national team as defined under FIFA eligibility rules; some limited exceptions apply. Players may hold more than one non-FIFA nationality.

No.	Pos.	Nation	Player
2	DF	NOR	Thea Sørbo
4	DF	SWE	Emma Pennsäter
5	DF	FIN	Anni Hartikainen
6	DF	FIN	Elli Pikkujämsä
8	DF	SWE	Emma Jansson
9	MF	SWE	Hanna Andersson
10	FW	ISL	Ísabella Sara Tryggvadóttir
11	MF	SWE	Molly Johansson
12	GK	SWE	Adela Dautović-Rix
13	GK	USA	Samantha Leshnak Murphy
14	FW	SWE	Emilia Larsson
16	MF	SWE	Emilia Pelgander

No.	Pos.	Nation	Player
18	MF	NGA	Halimatu Ayinde
19	FW	SWE	Maja Johansson
20	DF	SWE	Mikaela Stojanovska
23	MF	BLR	Anastasiya Pobegaylo
24	FW	NGA	Anam Imo
30	MF	JPN	Aemu Oyama
43	GK	SWE	Saga Andersson
44	DF	SWE	Jo-Anne Cronquist
45	MF	SWE	Tilde Björklund
47	FW	SWE	Filippa Sjöström
49	DF	SWE	Alice Enehov
51	MF	SWE	Lovisa Yng

== Transfers ==
=== Transfers in ===
Date	Position	Nationality	Name	From	Ref.
30 July 2025	GK	(United States)	Samantha Leshnak Murphy	(United States) Carolina Ascent	
10 July 2025	MF	(Belarus)	Anastasiya Pobegaylo	(Denmark) Fortuna Hjørring	
21 July 2025	DF	(Finland)	Elli Pikkujämsä	(United States) Racing Louisville	
31 July 2025	FW	(Nigeria)	Anam Imo	(Sweden) Piteå IF	
2 August 2025	DF	(Norway)	Thea Sørbo	(Sweden) Hammarby IF	

=== Loans in ===
Date	Position	Nationality	Name	From	Ref.
24 January 2025	MF	(Sweden)	Emilia Pelgander	(England) Leicester City	
5 August 2025	MF	(Japan)	Aemu Oyama	(England) Manchester City	

=== Transfers out ===
Date	Position	Nationality	Name	To	Ref.
27 June 2025	MF	(Japan)	Yuna Hazekawa	Free agent	
18 July 2025	DF	(Iceland)	Guðrún Arnardóttir	(Portugal) Braga	
26 July 2025	MF	(Sweden)	Bea Sprung	(Sweden) Hammarby IF	
1 August 2025	GK	(Sweden)	Angel Mukasa	(Turkey) Galatasaray	
2 August 2025	DF	(Norway)	Emilie Woldvik	(Italy) Fiorentina	
8 August 2025	GK	(Scotland)	Eartha Cumings	(England) Manchester City	
30 August 2025	FW	(Finland)	Oona Sevenius	(England) Newcastle United	

== Friendlies ==
25 January 2025 Friendly	Brøndby IF (Denmark)	2–0	(Sweden) FC Rosengård	Brøndby
13:30	Hashemi 58', 81'	Report		Stadium: 1964 Park

1 February 2025 Friendly	FC Rosengård (Sweden)	0–1	(Denmark) FC Nordsjælland	Malmö
13:00		Report	Kolbjørnsen 3'	Stadium: Malmö IP; Referee: Niklas Olsson

8 February 2025 Friendly	FC Rosengård (Sweden)	8–0	(Denmark) FC Copenhagen	Malmö
13:00	Larsson 8'; Andersson 23', 82'; Cronquist 44'; Sevenius 54', 56', 62'; Johansson 74'	Report		Stadium: Malmö IP; Referee: Viktor Wiaczek

15 February 2025 Friendly	Kristianstads DFF	1–0	FC Rosengård	Kristianstad
13:00	Egnér 77'	Report		Stadium: Kristianstads Fotbollsarena; Referee: Hassan Al-Saqr

18 July 2025 Friendly	FC Rosengård (Sweden)	1–0	(Denmark) FC Nordsjælland	Malmö
18:00	Pobegaylo 19'	Report		Stadium: Malmö IP; Attendance: 109; Referee: Bobby Sjögren-Engels

25 July 2025 Friendly	FC Rosengård (Sweden)	5–2	(Norway) Lillestrøm SK	Fjärås Kyrkby
16:00	Pobegaylo 28'; Andersson 50'; Pikkujämsä 52'; Pelgander 66'; Johansson 89'	Report	Christensen 38', 63' (pen.)	Stadium: Ögardets IP; Referee: Lovisa Johansson

1 August 2025 Friendly	HB Køge (Denmark)	2–0	(Sweden) FC Rosengård	Køge
14:00	Garcia 75'; Luplau 79'	Report		Stadium: Capelli Sport Stadion

== Damallsvenskan ==
=== League table ===
Pos	Team	Pld	W	D	L	GF	GA	GD	Pts	Qualification or relegation
9	Piteå IF	26	9	4	13	31	43	−12	31	
10	Växjö DFF	26	9	3	14	38	56	−18	30	
11	FC Rosengård	26	7	4	15	30	42	−12	25	
12	IF Brommapojkarna (O)	26	7	2	17	42	65	−23	23	Qualification for the relegation play-offs
13	Linköping FC (R)	26	4	4	18	27	62	−35	16	Relegation to the Elitettan

Source: Swedish Football Association (in Swedish)
Rules for classification: 1) Points; 2) Goal difference; 3) Number of goals scored; 4) Head-to-head points; 5) Head-to-head goal difference; 6) Head-to-head away goals scored
(O) Play-off winners; (R) Relegated

=== Results summary ===
Overall								Home						Away					
Pld	W	D	L	GF	GA	GD	Pts	W	D	L	GF	GA	GD	W	D	L	GF	GA	GD
26	7	4	15	30	42	−12	25	4	3	6	18	21	−3	3	1	9	12	21	−9

Last updated: 16 November 2025.
Source: SvFF

=== Results by matchweek ===
Round	1	2	3	4	5	6	7	8	9	10	11	12	13	14	15	16	17	18	19	20	21	22	23	24	25	26
Ground	H	A	A	H	A	A	H	A	A	H	A	H	H	A	H	H	A	H	A	H	A	H	A	H	A	H
Result	W	W	L	W	D	L	W	L	L	L	W	D	L	L	L	D	L	L	L	L	L	L	L	D	W	W
Position	6	8	6	4	4	4	4	6	6	8	6	7	8	8	9	9	11	11	11	12	12	12	12	12	12	11

Source: SvFF
A = Away; H = Home; W = Win; D = Draw; L = Loss

=== Results ===
23 March 2025 Matchweek 1	FC Rosengård	1–0	Piteå IF	Malmö
14:00	Sevenius 46'	Report	Gray (yellow card) 56'; Henschler (yellow card) 60'; Imo (yellow card) 73'; Holm (yellow card) 87'	Stadium: Malmö IP; Attendance: 511; Referee: Lovisa Johansson

29 March 2025 Matchweek 2	Växjö DFF	0–1	FC Rosengård	Växjö
15:00	Harrysson (yellow card) 81'	Report	Woldvik 45'; Pelgander (yellow card) 59'; Johansson (yellow card) 90+2'; Hartikainen (yellow card) 90+3'	Stadium: Spiris Arena; Attendance: 416; Referee: George Jansizian

14 April 2025 Matchweek 3	Hammarby IF	4–0	FC Rosengård	Stockholm
19:00	Blakstad 4'; Wangerheim 18'; Holmberg 41'; Hasund 44'; Bragstad (yellow card) 82'; Persson Lundgren (yellow card) 88'	Report	Pelgander (yellow card) 79'; Andersson (yellow card) 83'	Stadium: Hammarby IP; Attendance: 2,069; Referee: Lovisa Johansson

21 April 2025 Matchweek 4	FC Rosengård	2–1	Kristianstads DFF	Malmö
15:00	Sprung 26'; Sevenius 48'; Cronquist 67'; Hartikainen (yellow card) 90'	Report	Reidy (yellow card) 36'; Árnadóttir (yellow card) 63'; Olsson 75'; Tryggvadóttir (yellow card) 90+6'	Stadium: Malmö IP; Attendance: 1,027; Referee: Maral Mirzai

27 April 2025 Matchweek 5	Djurgårdens IF	2–2	FC Rosengård	Stockholm
15:00	Wahlström 27'; Arnardóttir 37' (o.g.); Duras (yellow card) 43'; Ulenius (yellow card) 70'	Report	Andersson 24' (yellow card) 53'; Johansson (yellow card) 26' (goal) 34'; Kjetselberg (yellow card) 75'	Stadium: Kristinebergs IP; Attendance: 703; Referee: Lovisa Johansson

4 May 2025 Matchweek 6	Alingsås IF	1–0	FC Rosengård	Alingsås
15:00	Barth (yellow card) 18' (yellow-red card) 90+1'; Lundin 45'; Lorén (yellow card) 60'; Öhman (yellow card) 79'	Report		Stadium: Mjörnvallen; Attendance: 460; Referee: Isabelle Svensson

10 May 2025 Matchweek 7	FC Rosengård	2–1	IFK Norrköping	Malmö
15:00	Andersson 27'; Lindroos (yellow card) 45'; Kjetselberg (yellow card) 45'; Ayinde (yellow card) 45+3'; Larsson 74'	Report	Wik (yellow card) 23' (yellow-red card) 83'; Woldvik 45+5' (o.g.); Jones (yellow card) 58' (red card) 90+1'	Stadium: Malmö IP; Attendance: 437; Referee: Selma Griberg

17 May 2025 Matchweek 8	IF Brommapojkarna	2–1	FC Rosengård	Stockholm
14:00	Bengtsson 4'; Ahlberg 52'; Lillbäck (yellow card) 81'	Report	Woldvik 78'	Stadium: Grimsta IP; Attendance: 211; Referee: Hanna Laajanen

24 May 2025 Matchweek 9	FC Rosengård	0–1	BK Häcken	Malmö
15:00	Johannsson (yellow card) 31'	Report	Wickenheiser (yellow card) 13'; Lind (yellow card) 32'; Jusu Bah 56'	Stadium: Malmö IP; Attendance: 448; Referee: Hanna Laajanen

7 June 2025 Matchweek 10	AIK Stockholm	1–0	FC Rosengård	Stockholm
13:00	Grabus 62' (pen.); Reidy (yellow card) 90'	Report	Wickenheiser (yellow card) 13'; Lind (yellow card) 32'; Jusu Bah 56'	Stadium: Skytteholms IP; Attendance: 759; Referee: George Jansizian

14 June 2025 Matchweek 11	Linköping FC	0–3	FC Rosengård	Linköping
15:00	Eckhoff (yellow card) 77'	Report	Larsson 14'; Sevenius 60'; Woldvik 66'	Stadium: Linköping Arena; Attendance: 585; Referee: Ulrica Löv

19 June 2025 Matchweek 12	FC Rosengård	2–2	Vittsjö GIK	Malmö
18:00	Jansson 25'; Larsson 69'	Report	Nyby (yellow card) 12'; Wänglund 45+4'; Blagojević (yellow card) 74'; Persson 81'; Lind (yellow card) 90+3'	Stadium: Malmö IP; Attendance: 523; Referee: Maral Mirzai

8 August 2025 Matchweek 13	FC Rosengård	0–1	Malmö FF	Malmö
18:00	Jansson (yellow card) 65'; Lindroos (yellow card) 74'	Report	Plantin 86'	Stadium: Malmö IP; Attendance: 4,654; Referee: Eva Svärdsudd

12 August 2025 Matchweek 16	FC Rosengård	2–2	Hammarby IF	Malmö
19:00	Imo 28'; Sørbo 40'; Johansson (yellow card) 90+2'; Leshnak Murphy (yellow card) 90+6'	Report	Hasund 47'; Koivisto 50'	Stadium: Malmö IP; Attendance: 787; Referee: George Jansizian

16 August 2025 Matchweek 14	Kristianstads DFF	2–1	FC Rosengård	Kristianstad
15:00	Janzen (yellow card) 20'; Petrović 34'; Olsson (yellow card) 45'; Egnér 48'	Report	Pennsälter 56'	Stadium: Kristianstads Fotbollsarena; Attendance: 713; Referee: Selma Griberg

22 August 2025 Matchweek 15	FC Rosengård	2–3	Växjö DFF	Malmö
19:00	Pennsäter (yellow card) 26' (goal) 60'; Jansson 69'	Report	Nilsson 62'; Russell 78'; Ayinde 87' (o.g.)	Stadium: Malmö IP; Attendance: 324; Referee: Ulrica Löv

5 September 2025 Matchweek 17	Vittsjö GIK	3–2	FC Rosengård	Vittsjö
18:00	Rewucha 10', 38'; Sällström 16'; Galić (yellow card) 50'; Persson (yellow card) 74'; Tunturi (yellow card) 90+2'	Report	Pabihaila 7'; Pikkujämsä (yellow card) 42'; Larsson 64'; Sjöström (yellow card) 86'	Stadium: Vittsjö IP; Attendance: 852; Referee: Selma Griberg

14 September 2025 Matchweek 18	FC Rosengård	1–2	AIK Stockholm	Malmö
13:00	Oyama 41'; Imo (yellow card) 43'	Report	Whyman (yellow card) 41'; Grabus 49' (pen.); Selin 63'; Oskarsson (yellow card) 76'	Stadium: Malmö IP; Attendance: 302; Referee: George Jansizian

21 September 2025 Matchweek 19	BK Häcken	3–0	FC Rosengård	Gothenburg
16:00	Schröder (yellow card) 3' (goal) 68'; Cronquist 72' (o.g.); Nildén 80'	Report		Stadium: Bravida Arena; Attendance: 1,464; Referee: Eva Svärdsudd

28 September 2025 Matchweek 20	FC Rosengård	2–5	IF Brommapojkarna	Malmö
13:00	Larsson 73'; Ayinde (yellow card) 74'; Jansson 88'	Report	Lillbäck 16', 68'; Thörnqvist 24'; Bengtsson 64'; Olsson 75' (pen.)	Stadium: Malmö IP; Attendance: 342; Referee: Ulrica Löv

4 October 2025 Matchweek 21	Malmö FF	1–2	FC Rosengård	Malmö
13:00	Kanutte Fornes 17', 32'; Kristell (yellow card) 56'	Report	Sørbo (yellow card) 11'; Larsson 51'; Hartikainen (yellow card) 55'	Stadium: Stadion; Attendance: 2,808; Referee: Isabelle Svensson

11 October 2025 Matchweek 22	FC Rosengård	1–2	Djurgårdens IF	Malmö
13:00	Jansson 90' (pen.)	Report	Ulenius 48', 64' (yellow card) 90+5'; Koivunen (yellow card) 89'	Stadium: Malmö IP; Referee: Selma Griberg

19 October 2025 Matchweek 23	IFK Norrköping	1–0	FC Rosengård	Norrköping
15:00	Wik 8'; de la Harpe (yellow card) 36'; Carrie Jones (yellow card) 90+3'	Report		Stadium: Nya Parken; Attendance: 757; Referee: Eva Svärdsudd

2 November 2025 Matchweek 24	FC Rosengård	0–0	Alingsås IF	Malmö
16:00		Report	Roholt (yellow card) 61'	Stadium: Malmö IP; Attendance: 387; Referee: Hanna Laajanen

8 November 2025 Matchweek 25	Piteå IF	0–1	FC Rosengård	Piteå
13:00	Tenini (yellow card) 90'	Report	Imo 90'	Stadium: LF Arena; Attendance: 667; Referee: Lovisa Johansson

16 November 2025 Matchweek 26	FC Rosengård	3–0	Linköping FC	Malmö
14:00	Andersson 2', 48', 84'; Johansson (yellow card) 38'	Report	Eriksson 40'	Stadium: Malmö IP; Attendance: 968; Referee: Hanna Laajanen

== Svenska Cupen ==
=== Third round ===
24 September 2025 Third round	Lilla Torg FF	0–7	FC Rosengård	Malmö
18:30		Report	Oyama 10', 67'; Cronquist 25'; Tryggvadóttir 37'; Johansson 51'; Jansson 61'; Larsson 81'	Stadium: Malmö Stadion; Attendance: 572; Referee: Fatmir Ademi

=== Group stage ===
Pos	Team	Pld	W	D	L	GF	GA	GD	Pts	Qualification	HAM	ROS	VÄX	VIT
1	Hammarby IF	3	2	1	0	9	2	+7	7	Advance to the semi-finals			2–2	3–0
2	FC Rosengård	3	1	1	1	4	5	−1	4		0–3			
3	Växjö DFF	3	0	2	1	4	7	−3	2			0–3		
4	Vittsjö GIK	3	0	2	1	3	6	−3	2			1–1	2–2	

Source: Swedish Football Association
Rules for classification: Tiebreakers

14 February 2026	Vittsjö GIK	1–1	FC Rosengård	Hässleholm
17:00	Klinga 20'; Jakobsson (yellow card) 87'	Report	Johansson (yellow card) 54'; Lindroos (yellow card) 87'; Pobegaylo 90+2'	Stadium: Österås IP; Referee: Dino Demo

23 February 2026	FC Rosengård	v	Hammarby IF	Malmö
19:00		Report		Stadium: Malmö IP; Referee: George Jansizian

16 March 2026	Växjö DFF	v	FC Rosengård	Växjö
19:00		Report		Stadium: Sportfältet Teleborg

== UEFA Women's Champions League ==
=== Second qualifying round ===
27 August 2025 Second qualifying round	FC Rosengård (Sweden)	5–0	(North Macedonia) Ljuboten	Leuven
13:00	Johansson (yellow card) 15'; Imo 44' (pen.), 59'; Sjöström 52'; Larsson 80', 90+1'	Report	Zivikj (yellow card) 18'; Nedeva (yellow card) 35'; Mustafa (yellow card) 43'; Terawaki (yellow card) 79'	Stadium: Den Dreef; Attendance: 60; Referee: Martina Molinaro (Italy)

30 August 2025 Second qualifying round	FC Rosengård (Sweden)	2–3	(Belgium) OH Leuven	Leuven
20:00	Larsson 60'; Imo 71'; Jo-Anne Cronquist (yellow card) 90+5'	Report	Reynders 10' (yellow card) 45+2'; Conijnenberg 18', 35'; Veefkind (yellow card) 68'	Stadium: Den Dreef; Attendance: 998; Referee: Michalina Diakow (Poland)

== UEFA Women's Europa Cup ==
=== Second qualifying round ===
7 October 2025 Second qualifying round	Sporting CP (Portugal)	3–0	(Sweden) FC Rosengård	Alcochete
20:45 (19:45 UTC+1)	Haugen 39'; Santiago 60'; Barron (yellow card) 87'; Bonsegundo 90+5'	Report	Cronquist (yellow card) 41'; Larsson (yellow card) 90+3'	Stadium: Stadium Aurelio Pereira; Attendance: 427; Referee: Franziska Wildfeuer (Germany)

15 October 2025 Second qualifying round	FC Rosengård (Sweden)	2–2	(Portugal) Sporting CP	Malmö
19:00	Björklund (yellow card) 12'; Johansson 47'; Sjöström 62'; Larsson (yellow card) 66'	Report	Neto 29'; Santiago 57'	Stadium: Malmö IP; Attendance: 248; Referee: Jana Adámková (Czech Republic)

== World Sevens Football ==
=== Group stage ===
Pos	Team	Pld	W	D	L	GF	GA	GD	Pts	Qualification
1	(Germany) Bayern Munich	3	3	0	0	11	3	+8	3	Advanced to knockout stage
2	(England) Manchester City	3	2	0	1	7	5	+2	2	Advanced to knockout stage
3	(Netherlands) Ajax	3	1	0	2	6	6	0	1	
4	(Sweden) Rosengård	3	0	0	3	0	10	−10	0	

Source: World Sevens

21 May 2025 Group stage	Manchester City (England)	4–0	(Sweden) FC Rosengård	Estoril
17:00	Fujino 2'; Kerolin 5', 16'; Oyama 25'	Report		Stadium: Estádio António Coimbra da Mota

22 May 2025 Group stage	FC Rosengård (Sweden)	0–4	(Germany) Bayern Munich	Estoril
14:30		Report	Tanikawa 4'; Damnjanović 16'; Harder 18'; Zigiotti Olme 29'	Stadium: Estádio António Coimbra da Mota

22 May 2025 Group stage	FC Rosengård (Sweden)	0–2	(Netherlands) Ajax	Estoril
19:30		Report	Yohannes 5'; Jansen 26'	Stadium: Estádio António Coimbra da Mota

== Squad statistics ==
As of 16 November 2025

Starting appearances are listed first, followed by substitute appearances after the + symbol where applicable.

No.	Pos	Nat	Player	Total		Damallsvenskan		Svenska Cupen		Champions League		Europa Cup	
No.	Pos	Nat	Player	Apps	Goals	Apps	Goals	Apps	Goals	Apps	Goals	Apps	Goals
2	DF	(Norway) NOR	Thea Sørbo	19	1	13+1	1	1	0	2	0	0+2	0
4	DF	(Sweden) SWE	Emma Pennsäter	7	3	5+2	2	0	1	0	0	0	0
5	DF	(Finland) FIN	Anni Hartikainen	22	0	12+7	0	0+1	0	0	0	2	0
6	DF	(Finland) FIN	Elli Pikkujämsä	16	0	3+8	0	1	0	1+1	0	2	0
8	DF	(Sweden) SWE	Emma Jansson	28	6	24	4	1	0+1	1	1	1+1	0
9	MF	(Sweden) SWE	Hanna Andersson	29	5	21+5	5	0	0	1	0	0+2	0
10	FW	(Iceland) ISL	Ísabella Sara Tryggvadóttir	21	0	4+12	0	1	0	0+2	0	2	0
11	MF	(Sweden) SWE	Molly Johansson	28	2	20+4	1	0+1	1	1	0	2	0
13	GK	(United States) USA	Samantha Leshnak Murphy	15	0	13	0	0	0	2	0	0	0
14	MF	(Sweden) SWE	Emilia Larsson	30	10	18+7	6	0+1	1	2	3	0+2	0
16	MF	(Sweden) SWE	Emilia Pelgander	30	0	22+3	0	0+1	0	1+1	0	1+1	0
18	MF	(Nigeria) NGA	Halimatu Ayinde	19	1	15+3	0	0	1	1	0	0	0
19	FW	(Sweden) SWE	Maja Johansson	13	0	2+8	0	1	0	1	0	1	0
20	DF	(Sweden) SWE	Mikaela Stojanovska	5	0	0+2	0	1	0	0+1	0	1	0
23	MF	(Belarus) BLR	Anastasiya Pobegaylo	17	1	12+1	1	0	0	2	0	1+1	0
24	MF	(Nigeria) NGA	Anam Imo	14	5	7+4	2	0	0	2	3	1	0
30	MF	(Japan) JPN	Aemu Oyama	16	3	7+4	1	1	2	1+1	0	2	0
43	GK	(Sweden) SWE	Saga Andersson	4	0	1	0	1	0	0	0	2	0
44	DF	(Sweden) SWE	Jo-Anne Cronquist	27	1	23+1	0	1	1	1	0	1	0
45	MF	(Sweden) SWE	Tilde Björklund	12	0	4+5	0	1	0	0	0	1+1	0
49	DF	(Sweden) SWE	Alice Enehov	4	0	0+3	0	0	0	0+1	0	0	0
50	FW	(Sweden) SWE	Filippa Sjöström	17	1	2+11	0	0	0	1+1	1	2	0
51	MF	(Sweden) SWE	Lovisa Yng	1	0	0	0	1	0	0	0	0	0
Players who left the club during the season
1	GK	(Scotland) SCO	Eartha Cumings	12	0	12	0	0	0	0	0	0	0
2	DF	(Norway) NOR	Emilie Woldvik	12	3	12	3	0	0	0	0	0	0
3	DF	(Iceland) ISL	Guðrún Arnardóttir	12	0	11+1	0	0	0	0	0	0	0
21	FW	(Sweden) SWE	Oona Sevenius	13	3	13	3	0	0	0	0	0	0
40	MF	(Sweden) SWE	Bea Sprung	12	1	9+3	1	0	0	0	0	0	0

- Source: Swedish Football Association

== See also ==
- 2025 FC Rosengård 1917 season
