= 2020 Elitettan =

Elitettan
- Season: 2020
- Dates: 14 June 2020 – 8 November 2020
- Champions: AIK
- Relegated: Kvarnsvedens IK; Sandvikens IF; Sunnanå SK
- Matches played: 182
- Goals scored: 650 (3.57 per match)
- Top goalscorer: Adelisa Grabus (25 goals)
- Biggest home win: Hammarby IF 8–0 Sandvikens IF (11 July 2020) Alingsås IF 7–0 Älvsjö (17 October 2020) Morön BK 7–0 Sunnanå SK (1 July 2020)
- Biggest away win: Bollstanäs SK 1–7 AIK (7 November 2020)
- Highest scoring: Bollstanäs SK 1–7 AIK (7 November 2020) IFK Kalmar 5–3 Sandvikens IF (17 October 2020) Sandvikens IF 4–4 IF Brommapojkarna (14 October 2020) IF Brommapojkarna 4–4 Älvsjö (24 September 2020) Mallbackens IF 5–3 Lidköpings FK (29 July 2020) Hammarby IF 8–0 Sandvikens IF (11 July 2020)
- All statistics correct as of 14 November 2020.

The 2020 Elitettan was the eighth season of the Elitettan, the Swedish women's association football second tier division. The season started on 14 June 2020 and ended on 8 November 2020. Umeå IK were the defending champions.

== Teams ==
Fourteen teams contested the league; the nine remaining teams from the previous season, the two relegated teams from the 2019 Damallsvenskan and the three promoted teams from the Division 1.

Club	Location	Venue	Capacity
AIK	Stockholm	Skytteholms IP	5,000
Alingsås	Alingsås	Mjörnvallen Idrottsplats	1,500
Bollstanäs SK	Uppslands Väsby	Bolstanäs IP	
IF Brommapojkarna	Stockholm	Grimsta IP	7,350
Hammarby IF	Stockholm	Hammarby IP	3,700
Jitex BK	Mölndal	Åbyvallen	8,000
IFK Kalmar	Kalmar	Gröndal	12,182
Kvarnsvedens IK	Borlänge	Ljungbergsplanen	1,010
Lidköpings FK	Lidköping	Framnäs IP	2,500
Mallbackens IF	Lysvik	Strandvallen	2,000
Morön BK	Skellefteå	Skogsvallen IP	1,500
Sandvikens IF	Sandviken	Jernvallen	7,000
Sunnanå SK	Skellefteå	Norvalla IP	10,000
Älvsjö AIK	Älvsjö	Älvsjö IP	

== League table ==
Pos	Team	Pld	W	D	L	GF	GA	GD	Pts	Promotion, qualification or relegation
1	AIK	26	24	0	2	77	17	+60	72	Promotion to Damallsvenskan
2	Hammarby IF	26	21	3	2	76	25	+51	66	Promotion to Damallsvenskan
3	Morön BK	26	18	1	7	61	30	+31	55	
4	IFK Kalmar	26	14	3	9	53	39	+14	45	
5	Mallbackens IF	26	12	6	8	41	37	+4	42	
6	Jitex BK	26	13	1	12	45	49	−4	40	
7	Alingsås IF	26	11	6	9	50	38	+12	39	
8	IF Brommapojkarna	26	11	6	9	57	47	+10	39	
9	Bollstanäs SK	26	9	5	12	42	52	−10	32	
10	Älvsjö AIK	26	6	4	16	29	62	−33	22	
11	Lidköpings FK	26	5	6	15	39	63	−24	21	
12	Kvarnsvedens IK	26	6	2	18	27	54	−27	20	Relegation to Division 1
13	Sandvikens IF	26	5	4	17	30	65	−35	19	Relegation to Division 1
14	Sunnanå SK	26	3	1	22	23	72	−49	10	Relegation to Division 1

Source: Svenskfotboll.se (in Swedish)
Rules for classification: 1) Points; 2) Goal difference; 3) Number of goals scored; 4) Head-to-head points; 5) Head-to-head goal difference; 6) Head-to-head away goals scored

== Results ==
Home \ Away	AIK	ALI	BOL	BRO	HAM	JIT	KAL	KVA	LID	MAL	MOR	SAN	SUN	ÄLV
AIK		1–0	5–1	3–1	1–2	4–2	3–2	6–0	2–0	2–0	1–0	5–0	3–2	2–0
Alingsås IF	0–2		3–0	0–1	0–1	2–3	0–3	3–2	2–2	1–1	1–4	3–0	1–0	7–0
Bollstanäs SK	1–7	2–2		1–1	0–3	2–1	3–2	0–2	3–3	1–1	1–6	4–0	6–0	1–0
IF Brommapojkarna	1–0	2–2	2–3		3–4	1–2	1–2	3–1	4–2	4–1	1–2	1–1	5–1	4–4
Hammarby IF	1–4	1–3	4–1	2–2		3–0	2–1	4–1	5–1	2–1	2–0	8–0	5–1	5–2
Jitex BK	0–2	0–4	2–3	1–3	0–5		0–1	3–2	1–1	1–0	3–4	1–2	3–2	2–0
IFK Kalmar	0–4	1–2	1–0	3–1	1–2	1–2		3–1	3–2	2–2	3–2	5–3	2–1	5–1
Kvarnsvedens IK	0–2	3–0	0–4	1–3	0–0	1–2	1–3		3–0	0–1	0–2	0–0	1–2	0–1
Lidköpings FK	0–2	3–3	2–2	3–2	0–2	1–3	1–0	2–3		0–3	1–2	0–2	1–1	2–3
Mallbackens IF	1–3	3–4	1–0	3–0	1–1	1–3	1–1	2–1	5–3		1–1	3–2	1–0	2–0
Morön BK	1–2	0–1	1–0	0–4	0–3	2–1	2–0	1–0	5–1	3–0		4–1	7–0	2–1
Sandvikens IF	0–5	0–2	1–0	4–4	1–2	0–1	1–3	1–2	1–2	1–2	0–2		2–0	1–2
Sunnanå SK	0–2	2–1	1–3	1–2	1–4	1–2	0–4	3–0	0–3	1–2	1–2	1–5		0–2
Älvsjö AIK	2–4	1–1	1–0	0–1	0–3	1–4	1–1	1–2	1–3	0–2	1–6	1–1	3–1	

Source: Soccerway
Legend: Blue = home team win; Yellow = draw; Red = away team win.

== Top scorers ==
As of 14 November 2020

Rank	Player	Club	Goals
1	(Sweden) Adelisa Grabus	AIK	25
2	(Sweden) Emma Jansson	Hammarby IF	18
3	(Sweden) Emilia Larsson	Hammarby IF	17
4	(Sweden) Mimmi Asperot	IFK Kalmar	16
4	(United States) Tabby Tindell	IFK Kalmar	16
6	(United States) Hayley Dowd	Morön BK	15
7	(Sweden) Ina Burström	Bollstanäs SK	13
7	(Philippines) Katrina Guillou	Morön BK	13
