= Halimatu Ayinde =

Nigerian footballer (born 1995)

Personal information
- Full name: Halimatu Ibrahim Ayinde
- Date of birth: 16 May 1995 (age 31)
- Place of birth: Kaduna, Nigeria
- Height: 1.65 m (5 ft 5 in)
- Position: Midfielder

Team information
- Current team: BK Häcken
- Number: 28

Senior career*
Years	Team	Apps	(Gls)
- Delta Queens
2015–2016	Western New York Flash	9	(1)
2016	FC Minsk	5	(4)
2018	Asarums IF	22	(4)
2019–2022	Eskilstuna United	50	(0)
2022–2025	FC Rosengård	45	(1)
2026–	BK Häcken	3	(0)

International career^{‡}
2010–2012	Nigeria U17	6	(4)
2014	Nigeria U20	6	(0)
2015–	Nigeria	36	(1)
- * Club domestic league appearances and goals as of 18 August 2026 ‡ National team caps and goals as of 18 August 2026

Halimatu Ibrahim Ayinde OON (born 16 May 1995) is a Nigerian professional footballer who plays as a midfielder for Damallsvenskan club BK Häcken and the Nigeria national team. She previously played for Western New York Flash in the United States, Delta Queens in Nigeria and Eskilstuna United in Sweden.

== Club career ==
Ayinde was signed by the American team Western New York Flash on 15 June 2015 from the Nigerian domestic team Delta Queens. She made her debut with a start in the 1–0 loss against the Houston Dash; she was substituted in the 79th minute. After spending a season with the team, during which time she made nine appearances, including five in the starting lineups, she was released on 12 May 2016. She had admitted underperforming in her first season with the Flash, but felt that she had improved in the 2016 preseason, scoring against the A team put forward by the University of Vermont. At the time this affected her selection for the Nigeria women's national football team, with Ayinde not being selected for a match against Senegal.

She joined FC Minsk of the Belarusian Premier League later that year, making her debut in the 3–0 victory over Bobruichanka Bobruisk on 2 September. She was one of three Minsk players to score in the match, and went on to appear for the team in their UEFA Women's Champions League games. Her form continued in her first few games, scoring the only goal in an away match against Nadezhda SDJuShOR-7 Mogilev on her third match for Minsk.

== International career ==
She was part of the Nigeria national team at the 2015 FIFA Women's World Cup and the winning squad at the 2014 African Women's Championship.

On 16 June 2023, she was included in the 23-player Nigerian squad for the FIFA Women's World Cup 2023.

== Honours ==
FC Rosengård

- Damallsvenskan: 2021, 2022, 2024
- Svenska Cupen: 2021–22

BK Häcken

- UEFA Women's Europa Cup: 2025–26

Nigeria

- Women's Africa Cup of Nations: 2014, 2016, 2024
- U-20 Women's World Cup: runners-up 2014

Orders

- Officer of the Order of the Niger
