= Guðrún Arnardóttir =

Guðrún Arnardóttir may refer to:

- Guðrún Arnardóttir (hurdler) (born 1971), Icelandic track and field athlete
- Guðrún Arnardóttir (footballer) (born 1995), Icelandic footballer
