= Ashley Barron =

American soccer player (born 2001)

Personal information
- Date of birth: January 24, 2001 (age 25)
- Height: 5 ft 11 in (1.80 m)
- Position: Center back

Team information
- Current team: Sporting CP
- Number: 41

Youth career
- Pacesetter SC
- 2015–2018: Notre Dame Eagles

College career
Years	Team	Apps	(Gls)
2019–2023	Cincinnati Bearcats	82	(5)

Senior career*
Years	Team	Apps	(Gls)
2024	KIF Örebro	15	(1)
2024–2025	Racing Power	22	(1)
2025–	Sporting CP	17	(3)
- * Club domestic league appearances and goals as of August 5, 2026

Ashley Michelle Barron (born January 24, 2001) is an American professional soccer player who plays as a center back for Campeonato Nacional Feminino club Sporting CP. She played college soccer for the Cincinnati Bearcats, winning AAC Defensive Player of the Year three times. She began her professional career with Swedish club KIF Örebro in 2024. Later that year, she moved to Portuguese club Racing Power, their first player acquired for a transfer fee. She then joined Sporting CP in 2025.

== Early life ==
Barron grew up in Toledo, Ohio. She played high school soccer at Notre Dame Academy, scoring 62 goals and adding 28 assists over four seasons. She was a three-time first-team all-state selection, three-time conference player of the year, and two-time district player of the year. She was also an all-conference performer in basketball and ran track. She played club soccer for Pacesetter SC. She committed to play college soccer for the Cincinnati Bearcats during her senior year.

== College career ==
Barron played in all 19 games, starting 18, and scored 1 goal for the Cincinnati Bearcats as a freshman in 2019. She led the team in outfield minutes played and was named first-team All-American Athletic Conference (AAC). In 2020, during a season shortened by the COVID-19 pandemic, she started all 11 games and scored 1 goal and was recognized as the AAC Defensive Player of the Year. She joined Vanessa Gilles as the second Bearcat to earn multiple first-team All-AAC selections.

Barron started 16 matches in her junior year in 2021, being named AAC Defensive Player of the Year for the second time. In her senior year in 2022, she started all 17 games and scored 2 goals as she became the first three-time AAC Defensive Player of the Year selection in any sport in conference history. She then registered for the 2023 NWSL Draft, but after going unselected, she returned to Cincinnati for her fifth and final season as the Bearcats joined the Big 12 Conference. That year, she started all 19 games and scored 1 goal and helped the team reach the Big 12 tournament quarterfinals.

== Club career ==
After going unselected in the 2024 NWSL Draft, Barron trained with Gotham FC as a non-roster invitee in the preseason. On February 1, 2024, she signed her first professional contract with Swedish club KIF Örebro on a one-year deal. She was viewed as the replacement for recently sold compatriot Regan Steigleder. She made her professional debut on March 9, starting and scoring the opening goal against AIK in the Swedish Women's Cup group stage. She was substituted out in the second half for concussion protocol in the eventual 2–1 loss. On May 9, she scored her first league goal – her club's first of the Damallsvenskan season – as they lost 4–2 to Kristianstad. Their first win of the campaign came a month later against Brommapojkarna with Barron recording an assist in the 4–1 victory. On August 1, KIF Örebro announced that Barron had been sold to an unnamed club after the buy-out clause in her contract was activated. She made 17 appearances and scored 2 goals for the club.

On August 21, 2024, Portuguese club Racing Power announced the signing of Barron. She was the first player the club ever acquired for a transfer fee, albeit for a reportedly "symbolic" amount. She debuted for the club on August 31, playing the entire match as the season began with a 1–1 draw with Marítimo. On January 26, 2025, she scored her first goal for the club in a 3–0 victory over Albergaria. She finished the season with 26 appearances and 1 goal in all competitions as Racing Power placed sixth in the league.

On August 7, 2025, Barron moved to fellow Portuguese club Sporting CP. Joining the club's sizable American contingent alongside Mackenzie Cherry, she was their biggest signing of the summer on a transfer fee of €50,000. She debuted for the club on September 11, playing the entire match in a 2–1 win away over Roma in the first leg of the UEFA Women's Champions League third qualifying round. The following week, she headed an own goal in the return leg as Sporting lost 2–0 and were eliminated from the competition. On September 22, she scored her first goal for the club in a 6–0 victory over Damaiense on the first day of the league season. Displaying strong performances throughout the season, she helped Sporting reach the quarterfinals of the inaugural UEFA Women's Europa Cup, losing on penalties to eventual runners-up Hammarby after a 1–1 draw on aggregate. She finished the season with 31 appearances and 3 goals in all competitions as Sporting were league runners-up to Benfica. She was runner-up in voting for the SJPF (players' union) Player of the Year award behind Benfica's Lúcia Alves.

== Honors and awards ==
Individual

- AAC Defensive Player of the Year: 2020, 2021, 2022
- First-team All-AAC: 2019, 2020, 2021, 2022
