= Mai Kadowaki (footballer) =

Japanese footballer (born 2001)

Mai Kadowaki 門脇 真依
Personal information
- Date of birth: 22 April 2001 (age 25)
- Place of birth: Hyōgo, Japan
- Height: 1.58 m (5 ft 2 in)
- Position: Forward

Team information
- Current team: RB Omiya Ardija
- Number: 20

Senior career*
Years	Team	Apps	(Gls)
–2019	JFA Academy Fukushima		
2023–2025	FC Rosengård	33	(14)
2025–2026	RB Leipzig	18	(0)
2026	→ RB Omiya Ardija (loan)	7	(0)
2026–	RB Omiya Ardija	3	(0)
- * Club domestic league appearances and goals as of 21:30, 7 October 2026 (UTC)

Mai Kadowaki (門脇 真依, Mai Kadowaki; born 22 April 2001) is a Japanese professional footballer who plays as a forward for WE League club RB Omiya Ardija.
