= Elli Pikkujämsä =

Finnish footballer (born 1999)

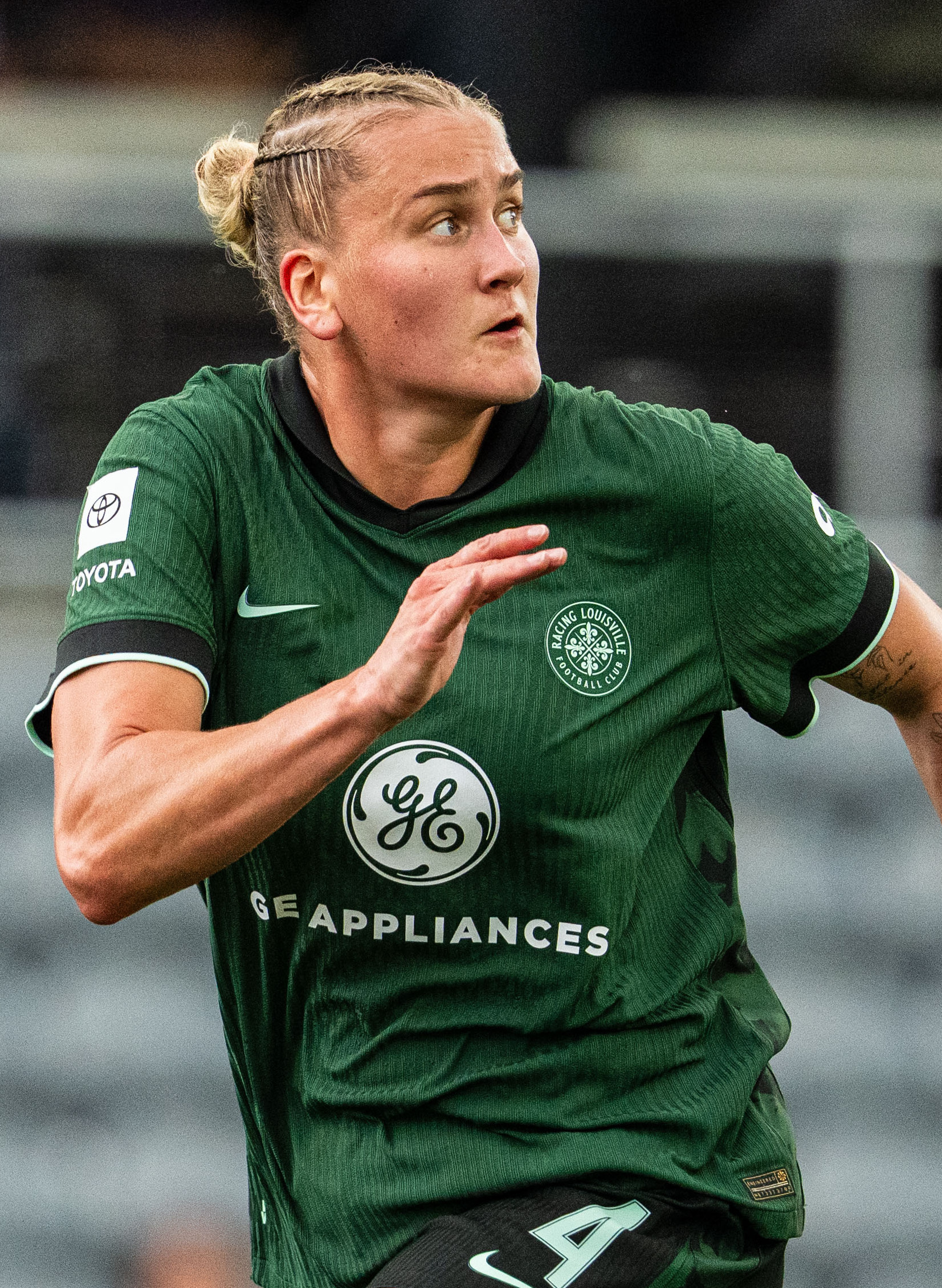
- Pikkujämsä with Racing Louisville FC in 2025

Personal information
- Date of birth: 24 October 1999 (age 27)
- Place of birth: Turku, Finland
- Height: 1.72 m (5 ft 8 in)
- Position: Defender

Team information
- Current team: FC Rosengård

Youth career
- TuNL
- Turun Weikot
- TPS

Senior career*
Years	Team	Apps	(Gls)
2015–2017	TPS	60	(15)
2018–2020	Honka	42	(3)
2020–2022	KIF Örebro	67	(6)
2023–2025	Racing Louisville	22	(1)
2025–	FC Rosengård	0	(0)

International career^{‡}
2019–	Finland	30	(2)
- * Club domestic league appearances and goals as of 21 July 2025 ‡ National team caps and goals as of 14 April 2024

Elli Pikkujämsä (born 24 October 1999) is a Finnish professional footballer who plays as a defender for Damallsvenskan club FC Rosengård and the Finland women's national football team. She is also a former snowboarder.

== Early years ==
Pikkujämsä was raised in Runosmäki, Turku. Growing up, Pikkujämsä's hobbies included basketball, swimming, track and field, tennis and snowboarding. Before her professional football career, Pikkujämsä won a silver medal in snowboarding in Junior World Championships in 2014 and bronze medal in 2015. In addition, she won a silver medal in 2016 Winter Youth Olympics.

== Club career ==
She has previously played for Swedish club KIF Örebro and Finnish clubs Turun Palloseura (TPS) and Honka.

On 13 December 2017, Pikkujämsä was announced at FC Honka.

In 2019, Pikkujämsä was given the award as the best defender in Finnish Naisten Liiga.

On 28 November 2019, Pikkujämsä was announced at KIF Örebro. On 3 November 2021, she signed a new one-year contract with the club.

She signed with National Women's Soccer League club Racing Louisville in December 2022. During her first season with Louisville, Pikkujämsä made 18 appearances in the league, scoring one goal. In March 2024, Pikkujämsä injured her knee in a NWSL match.

On 21 July 2025, Louisville transferred Pikkujämsä to Swedish club FC Rosengård in exchange for an undisclosed fee.

== International career ==
Pikkujämsä was called up to the 2019 Cyprus Women's Cup squad. On 1 March 2019, she made her international debut against Czech Republic.

Pikkujämsä was called up to the 2020 Cyprus Women's Cup squad.

Pikkujämsä was called up to the UEFA Women's Euro 2022 squad.

Pikkujämsä was part of the Finland squad that won the 2023 Cyprus Women's Cup for the first time.

On 18 July 2023, Pikkujämsä scored her first international goal against Scotland, scoring in the 25th minute.

Pikkujämsä was part of the Finland squad that won the 2024 Pinatar Cup for the first time.

== Career statistics ==
=== Club ===
As of 21 July 2025

Appearances and goals by club, season and competition
Club	Season	League			Cup (Note: Includes Finnish Women's Cup, Svenska Cupen (women) and NWSL Challenge Cup)		Continental		Total	
Club	Season	Division	Apps	Goals	Apps	Goals	Apps	Goals	Apps	Goals
TPS	2015	Naisten Liiga	16	2	—		—		16	2
TPS	2016	Naisten Liiga	23	8	4	1	—		27	9
TPS	2017	Naisten Liiga	21	5	2	2	—		23	7
TPS	Total		60	15	6	3	0	0	66	18
Honka	2018	Naisten Liiga	18	2	—		4 (Note: Appearances in UEFA Women's Champions League)	0	22	2
Honka	2019	Naisten Liiga	22	1	5	0	—		27	1
Honka	Total		40	3	5	0	4	0	49	3
KIF Örebro	2020	Damallsvenskan	22	0	4	0	—		26	0
KIF Örebro	2021	Damallsvenskan	21	1	3	1	—		24	2
KIF Örebro	2022	Damallsvenskan	24	5	1	1	—		25	6
KIF Örebro	Total		67	6	8	2	0	0	75	8
Racing Louisville	2023	NWSL	18	1	8	0	—		26	1
Racing Louisville	2024	NWSL	3	0	0	0	0	0	3	0
Racing Louisville	2025	NWSL	1	0	0	0	0	0	1	0
Racing Louisville	Total		22	1	8	0	0	0	30	1
FC Rosengård	2025	Damallsvenskan	0	0	0	0	—		0	0
Career total			189	25	27	5	4	0	220	30

=== International goals ===
No.	Date	Venue	Opponent	Score	Result	Competition
1.	18 July 2023	Tampere Stadium, Tampere, Finland	Scotland	1–2	1–2	Friendly
2.	5 December 2023	Anton Malatinský Stadium, Trnava, Slovakia	Slovakia	1–0	2–2	2023–24 UEFA Women's Nations League
