= Guðrún Arnardóttir (footballer) =

Icelandic footballer (born 1995)

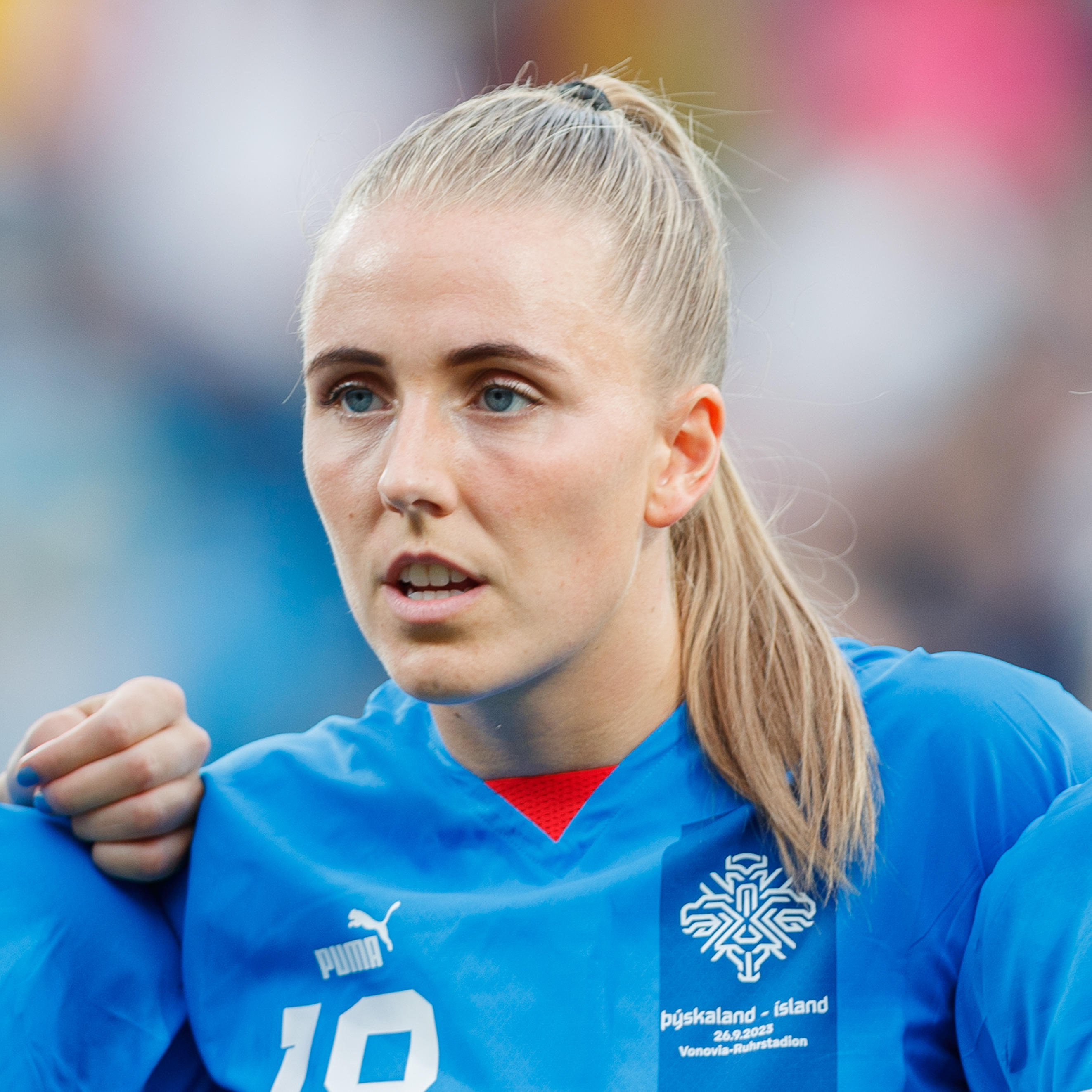
- Guðrún with Iceland in 2023

Personal information
- Date of birth: 29 July 1995 (age 31)
- Place of birth: Hafnarfjörður, Iceland
- Height: 5 ft 7 in (1.70 m)
- Position: Defender

Team information
- Current team: Hammarby

Youth career
- –2009: BÍ
- 2009–2011: Selfoss

College career
| Years | Team | Apps | (Gls) |
| 2016–2017 | Santa Clara | 45 | (5) |

Senior career*
| Years | Team | Apps | (Gls) |
| 2011 | Selfoss | 15 | (2) |
| 2012–2018 | Breiðablik | 97 | (8) |
| 2019–2021 | Djurgården | 47 | (0) |
| 2021–2025 | Rosengård | 98 | (11) |
| 2025–2026 | Braga | 7 | (0) |
| 2026– | Hammarby | 24 | (4) |

International career^{‡}
| 2018– | Iceland | 65 | (1) |
- * Club domestic league appearances and goals as of 22 November 2026 ‡ National team caps and goals as of 15 October 2026

Guðrún Arnardóttir (born 29 July 1995) is an Icelandic footballer who plays as a defender for Damallsvenskan club Hammarby IF and the Iceland women's national team.

In October 2021 she won the Damallsvenskan championship with FC Rosengård, and followed up with further titles in 2022 and 2024.

== Early life ==
Guðrún was born to Ingibjörg María Guðmundsdóttir and Örn Torfason and grew up in Ísafjörður. She played football for BÍ's junior teams before moving to play for Selfoss in 2009 where she played her first senior team match in 2011.

== National team career ==
Guðrún has been capped for the Iceland national team, appearing for the team during the 2019 FIFA Women's World Cup qualifying cycle.

On 13 June 2025, Guðrún was called up to the Iceland squad for the UEFA Women's Euro 2025.

== Honours ==
FC Rosengård

- Damallsvenskan: 2021, 2022, 2024
- Svenska Cupen: 2021–22
