= Anni Hartikainen =

Finnish footballer (born 2003)

Personal information
- Full name: Anni Eveliina Hartikainen
- Date of birth: 19 August 2003 (age 23)
- Place of birth: Kuopio, Finland
- Position: Midfielder

Youth career
- Pallokissat

Senior career*
Years	Team	Apps	(Gls)
2019–2023	KuPS	82	(17)
2024–	Rosengård	31	(1)

International career^{‡}
2021–2022	Finland U19	7	(2)
2022–2023	Finland U23	4	(0)
2023–	Finland	12	(1)
- * Club domestic league appearances and goals as of 3 July 2025 ‡ National team caps and goals as of 3 December 2024

Anni Eveliina Hartikainen (born 19 August 2003) is a Finnish professional footballer who plays as a midfielder for Damallsvenskan club FC Rosengård and the Finland national team.

== Club career ==
Hartikainen debuted in Naisten Liiga with KuPS in 2019. With KuPS, she won three consecutive Finnish championship titles in 2021–2023, and additionally the Finnish Women's Cup in 2023.

She signed with Damallsvenskan club Rosengård for the 2024 season. At the end of the season, they won the Swedish championship title.

== International career ==
A former youth international, Hartikainen debuted with the Finland national team on 22 September 2023, in a 2023–24 UEFA Women's Nations League win against Slovakia. She scored her first goal on 30 November 2023, in a 6–0 win against Romania.

In the beginning of December 2023, Hartikainen attended the annual Captain's Ball awards, held by the Football Association of Finland, where she was awarded the Kansallinen Liiga Player of the Year. Next morning, she overslept and missed the flight to the national team preparation camp for the last match of the Nations League campaign. Because of that, she was left out of the squad, by the decision of the head coach Marko Saloranta. She returned to the national team in early 2024.

== Career statistics ==
=== Club ===
As of 3 July 2025

Appearances and goals by club, season and competition
Club	Season	League			Cup (Note: Includes Finnish Women's Cup and Svenska Cupen (women))		League cup (Note: Includes Kansallinen Cup)		Europe		Total	
Club	Season	Division	Apps	Goals	Apps	Goals	Apps	Goals	Apps	Goals	Apps	Goals
KuPS	2019	Naisten Liiga	1	0	–		–		–		1	0
KuPS	2020	Kansallinen Liiga	18	2	1	0	–		–		19	2
KuPS	2021	Kansallinen Liiga	18	4	3	0	–		–		21	4
KuPS	2022	Kansallinen Liiga	23	3	2	0	–		4 (Note: Appearances in UEFA Women's Champions League)	1	29	4
KuPS	2023	Kansallinen Liiga	22	8	4	4	7	4	2	0	35	16
KuPS	Total		82	17	10	4	7	4	6	1	105	26
Rosengård	2024	Damallsvenskan	20	1	4	0	–		–		24	1
Rosengård	2025	Damallsvenskan	11	0	2	0	–		–		13	0
Rosengård	Total		31	1	6	0	0	0	0	0	37	1
Career total			113	18	16	4	7	4	6	1	142	27

=== International ===
As of 3 December 2024

Appearances and goals by national team and year
National team	Year	Apps	Goals
Finland	2023	4	1
Finland	2024	8	0
Total		12	1

Scores and results list Finland's goal tally first, score column indicates score after each Hartikainen goal.

List of international goals scored by Anni Hartikainen
No.	Date	Venue	Opponent	Score	Result	Competition
1.	30 Nov 2023	Veritas Stadion, Turku, Finland	Romania	6–0	6–0	2023–24 UEFA Women's Nations League B

== Honours ==
KuPS

- Kansallinen Liiga (3): 2021, 2022, 2023
- Finnish Women's Cup: 2023
- Kansallinen Cup runner-up: 2023

Rosengård

- Damallsvenskan: 2024

Finland

- Pinatar Cup: 2024

Individual

- Kansallinen Liiga Player of the Year: 2023
