= Eartha Cumings =

Scottish footballer (born 1999)

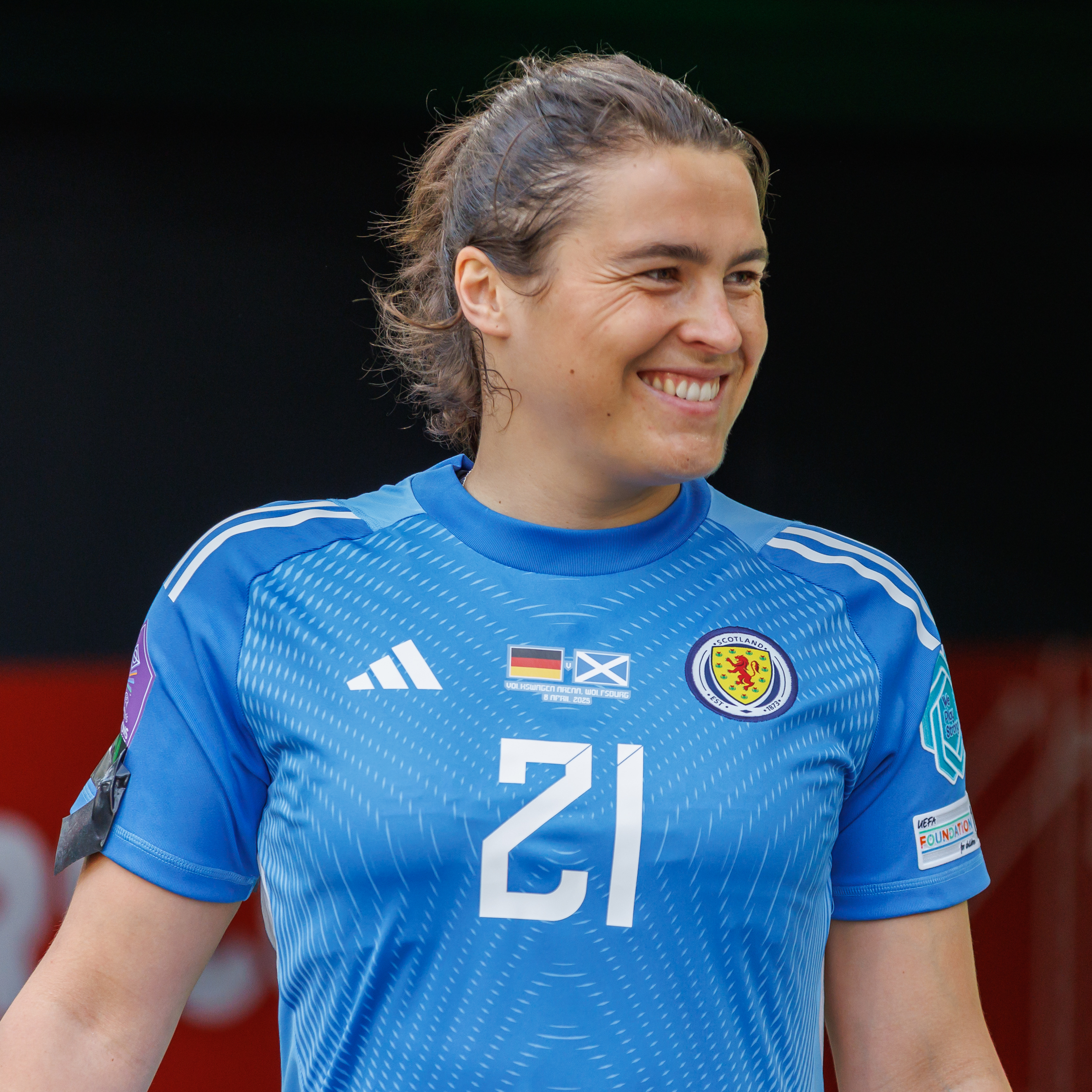
- Cumings with Scotland in 2025

Personal information
- Full name: Eartha Eliza Grace Cumings Budd
- Date of birth: 11 June 1999 (age 27)
- Place of birth: Edinburgh, Scotland
- Height: 1.70 m (5 ft 7 in)
- Position: Goalkeeper

Team information
- Current team: Manchester City
- Number: 1

Youth career
- Spartans

Senior career*
Years	Team	Apps	(Gls)
2014–2018	Spartans		
2018–2020	Bristol City	0	(0)
2020–2022	Charlton Athletic	37	(0)
2022–2023	Liverpool	2	(0)
2023	→ Everton (loan)	0	(0)
2023–2025	FC Rosengård	43	(0)
2025–	Manchester City	3	(0)

International career^{‡}
2013–2014	Scotland Under-16	3	(0)
2015–2016	Scotland Under-17	6	(0)
2016–2018	Scotland Under-19	7	(0)
2022–	Scotland	7	(0)
- * Club domestic league appearances and goals as of 21:45, 14 November 2026 (UTC) ‡ National team caps and goals as of 14:20, 8 August 2025 (UTC)

Eartha Eliza Grace Cumings Budd (born 11 June 1999) is a Scottish footballer who plays as a goalkeeper for Women's Super League club Manchester City and the Scotland national team.

== Life ==
Cumings was born in 1999 in Edinburgh. She went to university where she studied Ancient History.

== Playing career ==
=== Spartans ===
Cumings started her senior career at age 14 with the Scottish Women's Premier League (SWPL) club Spartans, which she joined age 10.

=== Bristol City ===
Cumings subsequently joined Bristol City in the FA WSL alongside fellow Scottish international Lucy Graham prior to the 2018–19 season.

=== Charlton Athletic ===
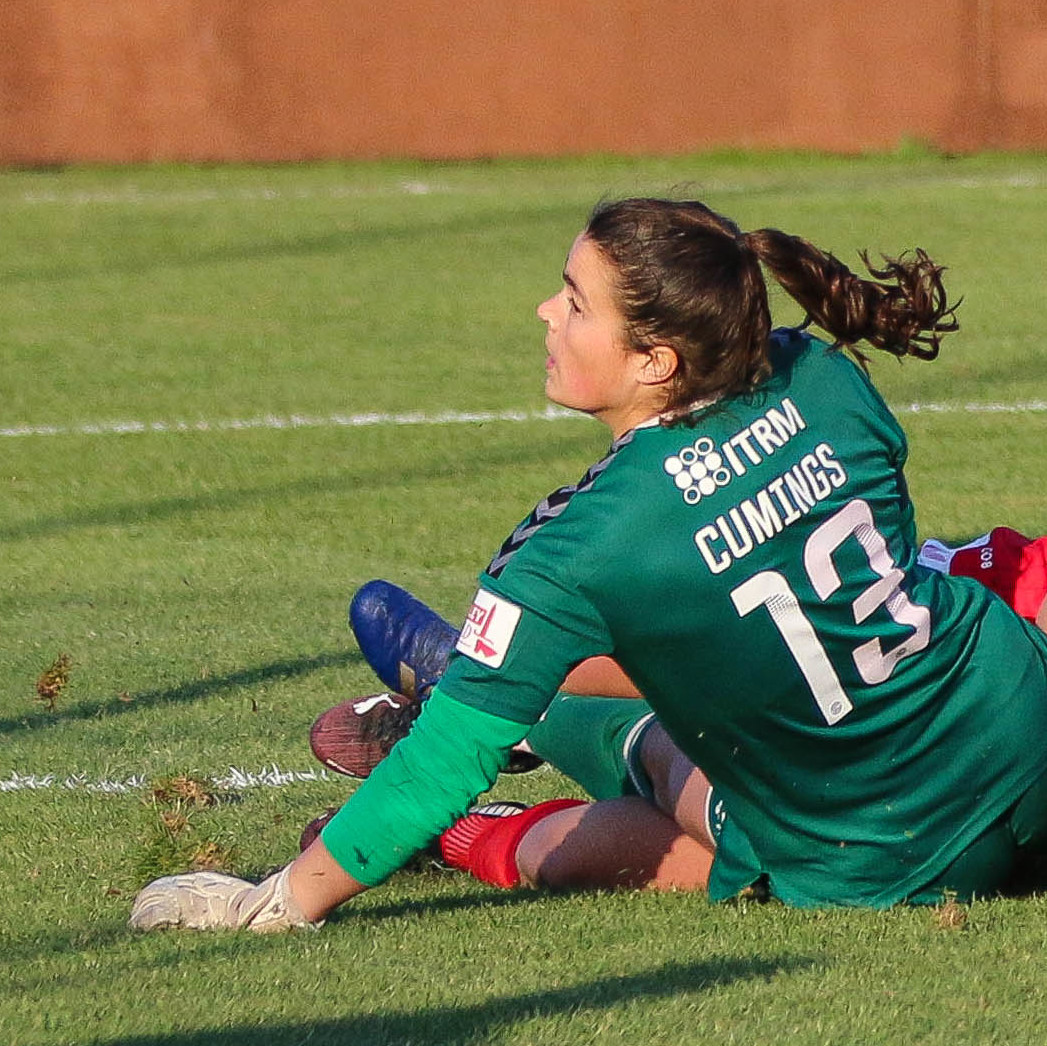
Cumings defending during a victory for Charlton over Lewes F.C. Women, 2022

In July 2021, Charlton Athletic announced its intentions to become a fully professional club. Cumings became the first player to sign a professional full-time contract with Charlton. Manager Karen Hills signed her although she had already played thirteen matches before signing the contract. Her debut season saw her named Players' Player of the Year, while in May she was named Player of the Year after an impressive campaign that included nine clean sheets and a run of almost 15 hours without conceding a goal in all competitions.

=== Liverpool ===
On 14 July 2022, Cumings joined the Reds after two impressive seasons with Charlton Athletic Women in the FA Women's Championship. On 4 March 2023, Cumings joined Liverpool's local rivals Everton on an emergency goalkeeper loan after Emily Ramsey sustained an ankle injury while on international duty with England.

=== FC Rosengård ===
On 7 August 2023, it was announced that Cumings had signed a two-year deal with FC Rosengård.

=== Manchester City ===
Cumings returned to the WSL on 8 August 2025, signing a three-year deal with Manchester City.

== International career ==
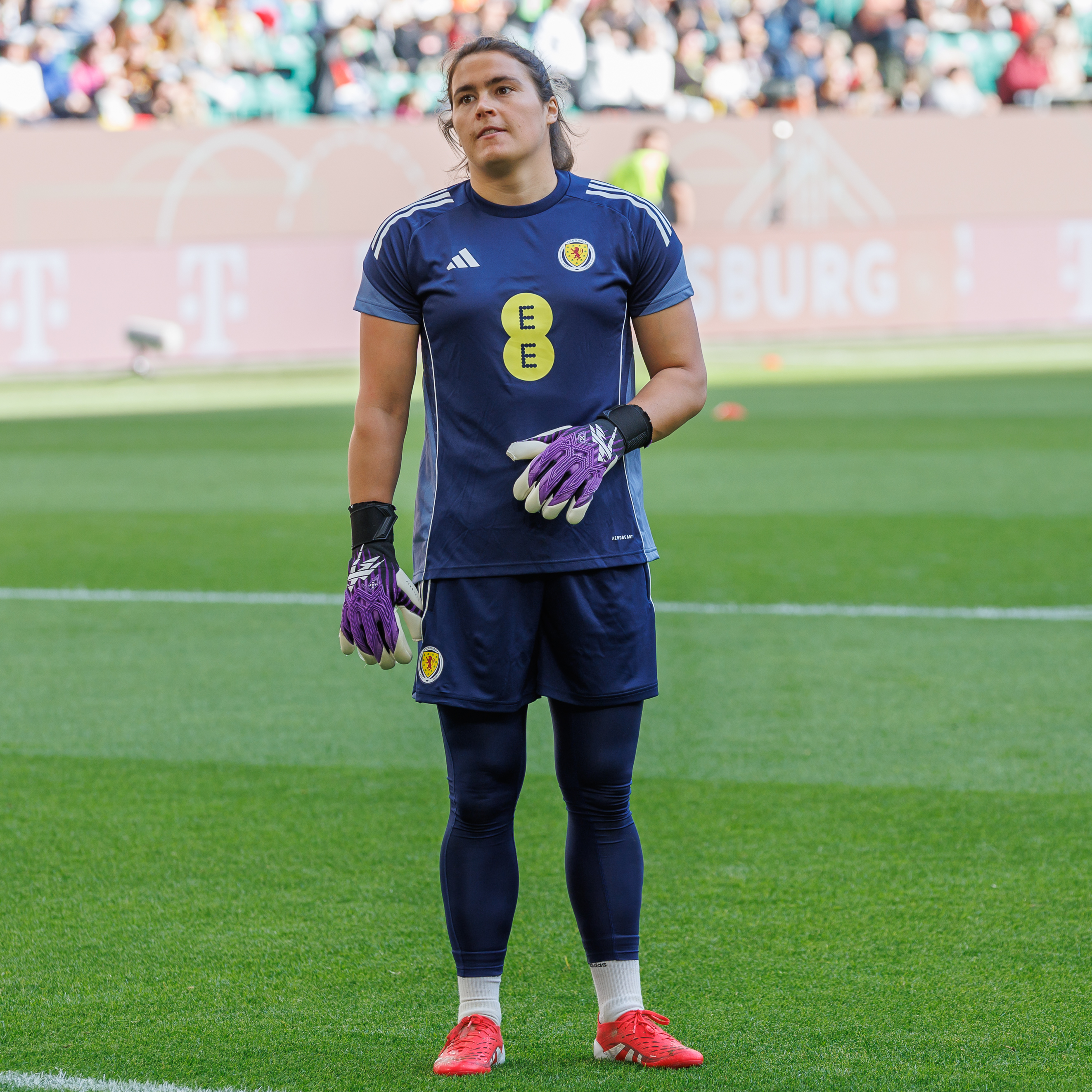
Cumings warming up for Scotland, 2025

Cumings represented Scotland at the under-16, under-17 and under-19 levels. In May 2021, she was named in the Scottish senior national squad for the first time, ahead of friendlies against Northern Ireland and Wales in June 2021. Cumings made her full international debut during the 2022 Pinatar Cup, in a goalless draw with Hungary.

== Personal life ==
During a routine operation, Cumings developed compartment syndrome and almost had to have both of her legs amputated. Cumings commented on the experience while speaking to The Guardian, "I had to have numerous surgeries to repair the injury and spent a good bit of time on crutches. Nearly losing the opportunity to play football changed my outlook. Even if I'm just sitting on the bench, I still think that's a huge achievement."

== Career statistics ==
=== Club ===
As of match played 14 November 2026

Appearances and goals by club, season and competition
Club	Season	League			National Cup		League Cup		Europe		Total	
Club	Season	Division	Apps	Goals	Apps	Goals	Apps	Goals	Apps	Goals	Apps	Goals
Bristol City	2018–19	Women's Super League	0	0	0	0	1	0	—		1	0
Bristol City	2019–20	Women's Super League	0	0	0	0	1	0	—		1	0
Bristol City	Total		0	0	0	0	2	0	0	0	2	0
Charlton Athletic	2020–21	Women's Championship	16	0	0	0	1	0	—		17	0
Charlton Athletic	2021–22	Women's Championship	21	0	1	0	3	0	—		25	0
Charlton Athletic	Total		37	0	1	0	4	0	0	0	42	0
Liverpool	2022–23	Women's Super League	2	0	0	0	3	0	—		5	0
Everton (loan)	2022–23	Women's Super League	0	0	0	0	0	0	—		0	0
FC Rosengård	2023	Damallsvenskan	5	0	1	0	—		1	0	7	0
FC Rosengård	2024	Damallsvenskan	26	0	0	0	—		—		26	0
FC Rosengård	2025	Damallsvenskan	12	0	4	0	—		—		16	0
FC Rosengård	Total		43	0	5	0	0	0	1	0	49	0
Manchester City	2025–26	Women's Super League	1	0	0	0	2	0	—		3	0
Manchester City	2026–27	Women's Super League	2	0	0	0	—		0	0	2	0
Manchester City	Total		3	0	0	0	2	0	0	0	5	0
Career total			85	0	6	0	11	0	1	0	103	0

=== International ===
As of match played 3 December 2024

Appearances and goals by national team and year
National team	Year	Apps	Goals
Scotland	2022	1	0
Scotland	2024	6	0
Total		7	0

== Honours ==
FC Rosengård

- Damallsvenskan: 2024

Manchester City

- Women's Super League: 2025–26
- Women's FA Cup: 2025–26
