= Anam Imo =

Nigerian footballer (born 2000)

Personal information
- Full name: Anam Mary Imo
- Date of birth: 30 November 2000 (age 25)
- Place of birth: Warri, Nigeria
- Height: 1.70 m (5 ft 7 in)
- Position: Forward

Team information
- Current team: FC Rosengård
- Number: 24

Senior career*
Years	Team	Apps	(Gls)
	Nasarawa Amazons	0	(0)
2019–2020	Rosengård	37	(7)
2021–2025	Piteå IF	98	(27)
2025–	FC Rosengård	0	(0)

International career^{‡}
	Nigeria U-20	4	(0)
2018–	Nigeria	12	(2)
- * Club domestic league appearances and goals as of 04:00, 10 December 2022 (UTC) ‡ National team caps and goals as of 13:15, 13 June 2019 (UTC)

Anam Mary Imo (born 30 November 2000) is a Nigerian footballer who plays for FC Rosengård in the Damallsvenskan and the national football team. She has also played for the under-20 team.

== Career ==
=== Club career ===
In March 2016, Imo scored the only goal for Nasarawa Amazons in their defeat to Nigeria under 17 team, in preparation for 2016 FIFA U-17 Women's World Cup.

=== International ===
Imo was among the players invited to the Nigerian squad for the 2015 African Games by head coach, Christopher Danjuma. During camping, she scored several goals for the team. Ahead of the 2016 Africa Women Cup of Nations, Imo was in the 30-man provisional squad by Florence Omagbemi, but didn't make the final team of 23 players. At under-20 level, She was instrumental in the qualification of Nigeria for 2018 FIFA U-20 Women's World Cup, scoring in both legs of the final qualification game against South Africa.

She was named in the final squad list by coach Thomas Dennerby to the 2018 WAFU Women's Cup. At the tournament, she scored a goal against the Togolese women's team in the final group game. In April 2018, Imo was in the starting lineup in Nigerian defeat to France in a friendly game in Le Mans.

== Accolades ==
- 2018 Nigeria Football Federation Awards – Woman Young Player of the Year (nominated)
