= 2024 Damallsvenskan =

Swedish women's football top division, 2024 season

Damallsvenskan
- Season: 2024
- Dates: 13 April – 9 November 2024
- Champions: FC Rosengård
- Relegated: KIF Örebro DFF; Trelleborgs FF
- Champions League: FC Rosengård; Häcken; Hammarby
- Matches: 182
- Goals: 558 (3.07 per match)
- Top goalscorer: Momoko Tanikawa (16 goals)
- Best goalkeeper: Eartha Cumings (19 clean sheets)
- Biggest home win: Rosengård 8–1 Trelleborg; 30 June 2024; Häcken 7–0 Trelleborg; 5 July 2024; Häcken 8-1 Linköpings FC; 12 October 2024; Brommapojkarna 7-0 Trelleborg; 19 October 2024
- Biggest away win: Trelleborg 1-9 Rosengård; 26 June 2024; Trelleborg 0-8 Hammarby; 26 August 2024
- Highest scoring: Trelleborg 1-9 Rosengård; 26 June 2024
- Longest winning run: Rosengård (23 matches)
- Longest unbeaten run: Rosengård (23 matches)
- Longest winless run: Trelleborg (26 matches)
- Longest losing run: Trelleborg (11 matches)
- Highest attendance: 6,012; Hammarby 4–0 AIK; 5 July 2024
- Lowest attendance: 119; Brommapojkarna 1-0 Örebro; 25 August 2024
- Total attendance: 157,143
- Average attendance: 863
- All statistics correct as of 25 November 2024.

The 2024 Damallsvenskan was the 37th season of the Swedish women's association football top division, Damallsvenskan. The league began on 13 April 2024, and ended on 9 November 2024. The league had a five-week break from 6 July to 11 August.

AIK and Trelleborg FF were new teams for this season after being promoted from Elitettan.

== Teams ==
Location of teams in 2024 Damallsvenskan

| Team | Location | Stadium | Turf | Stadium capacity^{a} |
|---|---|---|---|---|
| BK Häcken FF | Gothenburg | Bravida Arena | Artificial | 6,500 |
| Djurgårdens IF | Stockholm | Stockholm Olympic Stadium | Natural | 14,417 |
| FC Rosengård | Malmö | Malmö IP | Artificial | 5,700 |
| Hammarby IF | Stockholm | Hammarby IP | Artificial | 3,700 |
| IF Brommapojkarna | Stockholm | Grimsta IP | Artificial | 5,000 |
| AIK | Stockholm | Skytteholms IP | Artificial | 5,200 |
| KIF Örebro DFF | Örebro | Behrn Arena | Artificial | 12,624 |
| Kristianstads DFF | Kristianstad | Kristianstads fotbollsarena | Hybrid | 3,080^{b} |
| Kristianstads DFF | Kristianstad | Vilans IP | Natural | 5,000^{b} |
| Linköpings FC | Linköping | Arena Linköping | Artificial | 8,500 |
| IFK Norrköping | Norrköping | PlatinumCars Arena | Artificial | 17,234 |
| Piteå IF | Piteå | LF Arena | Artificial | 6,500 |
| Trelleborgs FF | Trelleborg | Vångavallen | Natural | 7,400 |
| Växjö DFF | Växjö | Visma Arena | Natural | 12,000 |
| Vittsjö GIK | Vittsjö | Vittsjö IP | Natural | 3,000 |

Notes: ^{a} According to each club information page previously available at the Swedish Football Association website for Damallsvenskan, unless otherwise noted. Since May 2018 this is no longer present. Numbers were usually lower than official stadium numbers.
^{b} According to Kristianstads DFF's history web page.

== Standings ==
| Pos | Team | Pld | W | D | L | GF | GA | GD | Pts | Qualification or relegation |
|---|---|---|---|---|---|---|---|---|---|---|
| 1 | FC Rosengård (C) | 26 | 25 | 0 | 1 | 99 | 9 | +90 | 75 | Qualification to Champions League second qualifying round |
| 2 | BK Häcken | 26 | 20 | 4 | 2 | 68 | 17 | +51 | 64 | Qualification to Champions League third qualifying round |
| 3 | Hammarby | 26 | 20 | 1 | 5 | 66 | 14 | +52 | 61 | Qualification to Champions League second qualifying round |
| 4 | Kristianstads DFF | 26 | 16 | 4 | 6 | 52 | 30 | +22 | 52 | |
| 5 | IFK Norrköping | 26 | 11 | 5 | 10 | 32 | 34 | −2 | 38 | |
| 6 | Piteå IF | 26 | 9 | 6 | 11 | 24 | 30 | −6 | 33 | |
| 7 | Djurgårdens IF | 26 | 8 | 7 | 11 | 34 | 38 | −4 | 31 | |
| 8 | Växjö DFF | 26 | 8 | 6 | 12 | 27 | 49 | −22 | 30 | |
| 9 | Linköping FC | 26 | 8 | 5 | 13 | 32 | 51 | −19 | 29 | |
| 10 | Vittsjö GIK | 26 | 7 | 6 | 13 | 25 | 41 | −16 | 27 | |
| 11 | IF Brommapojkarna | 26 | 7 | 6 | 13 | 32 | 52 | −20 | 27 | |
| 12 | AIK (O) | 26 | 7 | 5 | 14 | 36 | 54 | −18 | 26 | Qualification for the relegation play-offs |
| 13 | KIF Örebro DFF (R) | 26 | 5 | 4 | 17 | 19 | 43 | −24 | 19 | Relegation to Elitettan |
| 14 | Trelleborgs FF (R) | 26 | 0 | 3 | 23 | 12 | 96 | −84 | 3 | Relegation to Elitettan |

Source: svenskfotboll.se
Rules for classification: 1) Points; 2) Goal difference; 3) Number of goals scored; 4) Head-to-head points; 5) Head-to-head goal difference; 6) Head-to-head away goals scored
(C) Champions; (O) Play-off winners; (R) Relegated

== Results ==
| Home \ Away | AIK | DIF | HÄK | HAM | IBP | KRI | LIN | NOR | ORE | PIT | ROS | TRE | VÄX | VIT |
|---|---|---|---|---|---|---|---|---|---|---|---|---|---|---|
| AIK | | 1–1 | 1–2 | 0–2 | 2–2 | 1–3 | 1–0 | 2–3 | 1–0 | 0–0 | 1–5 | 4–0 | 2–1 | 2–3 |
| Djurgårdens IF | 2–0 | | 1–2 | 0–2 | 2–3 | 1–2 | 5–2 | 2–2 | 2–0 | 0–0 | 0–3 | 2–0 | 1–1 | 2–1 |
| BK Häcken | 4–0 | 4–1 | | 2–0 | 2–0 | 0–0 | 8–1 | 4–3 | 4–0 | 3–1 | 0–2 | 7–0 | 4–0 | 2–0 |
| Hammarby | 4–0 | 4–1 | 1–2 | | 2–1 | 1–2 | 3–0 | 2–0 | 2–0 | 2–0 | 0–1 | 5–0 | 1–2 | 6–0 |
| Brommapojkarna | 2–2 | 0–3 | 1–5 | 0–5 | | 1–3 | 0–0 | 0–1 | 1–0 | 0–0 | 0–7 | 7–0 | 3–2 | 4–0 |
| Kristianstad | 4–1 | 3–1 | 2–2 | 0–2 | 2–0 | | 3–1 | 1–3 | 3–1 | 0–1 | 1–3 | 3–1 | 3–3 | 0–0 |
| Linköpings FC | 1–0 | 0–2 | 1–1 | 0–0 | 0–0 | 0–2 | | 2–2 | 2–1 | 4–2 | 1–6 | 4–0 | 2–1 | 3–2 |
| IFK Norrköping | 2–3 | 2–2 | 0–1 | 0–3 | 0–0 | 2–0 | 1–0 | | 2–1 | 0–1 | 0–1 | 1–0 | 1–0 | 1–1 |
| KIF Örebro DFF | 1–1 | 1–0 | 0–1 | 0–1 | 4–1 | 2–4 | 2–1 | 0–2 | | 0–0 | 0–4 | 1–1 | 1–2 | 0–1 |
| Piteå IF | 5–3 | 1–0 | 0–0 | 0–1 | 4–1 | 1–2 | 0–2 | 1–0 | 0–1 | | 0–1 | 3–1 | 3–2 | 1–0 |
| FC Rosengård | 3–0 | 3–0 | 1–0 | 2–3 | 3–0 | 2–1 | 4–0 | 4–0 | 4–0 | 4–0 | | 8–1 | 4–0 | 5–0 |
| Trelleborgs FF | 1–5 | 0–2 | 0–2 | 0–8 | 0–2 | 0–5 | 0–3 | 1–2 | 2–3 | 0–0 | 1–9 | | 1–2 | 1–4 |
| Växjö DFF | 1–3 | 1–1 | 0–3 | 1–4 | 2–1 | 0–2 | 2–1 | 1–0 | 1–0 | 1–0 | 0–7 | 1–1 | | 0–0 |
| Vittsjö GIK | 2–0 | 0–0 | 1–3 | 0–2 | 1–2 | 0–1 | 3–1 | 1–2 | 0–0 | 2–0 | 0–3 | 3–0 | 0–0 | |

Updated to match(es) played on 9 November 2024. Source: svenskfotboll.se (in Swedish)
Legend: Blue = home team win; Yellow = draw; Red = away team win.

=== Positions by round ===
The table lists the positions of teams after each week of matches. In order to preserve chronological progress, any matches moved from their original game round are not included in the round at which they were originally scheduled, but added to the full round they were played immediately afterwards. For example, if a match is scheduled for round 13, but then postponed and played between rounds 16 and 17, it will be added to the standings for round 16.

| Team ╲ Round | 1 | 2 | 3 | 4 | 5 | 6 | 7 | 8 | 9 | 10 | 11 | 12 | 13 | 14 | 15 | 16 | 17 | 18 | 19 | 20 | 21 | 22 | 23 | 24 | 25 | 26 |
|---|---|---|---|---|---|---|---|---|---|---|---|---|---|---|---|---|---|---|---|---|---|---|---|---|---|---|
| FC Rosengård | 1 | 1 | 1 | 1 | 1 | 1 | 1 | 1 | 1 | 1 | 1 | 1 | 1 | 1 | 1 | 1 | 1 | 1 | 1 | 1 | 1 | 1 | 1 | 1 | 1 | 1 |
| Hammarby | 6 | 2 | 2 | 2 | 2 | 2 | 2 | 4 | 4 | 3 | 3 | 3 | 3 | 3 | 2 | 2 | 2 | 3 | 3 | 3 | 3 | 3 | 3 | 3 | 3 | 3 |
| BK Häcken | 4 | 4 | 4 | 3 | 3 | 3 | 3 | 2 | 2 | 2 | 2 | 2 | 2 | 2 | 3 | 3 | 3 | 2 | 2 | 2 | 2 | 2 | 2 | 2 | 2 | 2 |
| Kristianstads DFF | 2 | 6 | 9 | 7 | 4 | 4 | 4 | 3 | 3 | 4 | 4 | 4 | 4 | 4 | 4 | 4 | 4 | 4 | 4 | 4 | 4 | 4 | 4 | 4 | 4 | 4 |
| IFK Norrköping | 9 | 10 | 7 | 5 | 7 | 5 | 5 | 5 | 6 | 6 | 6 | 6 | 7 | 5 | 5 | 5 | 5 | 5 | 5 | 5 | 5 | 5 | 5 | 5 | 5 | 5 |
| Piteå IF | 5 | 5 | 8 | 10 | 10 | 10 | 10 | 11 | 10 | 11 | 9 | 7 | 5 | 8 | 9 | 6 | 6 | 6 | 6 | 7 | 7 | 7 | 7 | 7 | 6 | 6 |
| Djurgårdens IF | 3 | 3 | 3 | 6 | 8 | 6 | 6 | 6 | 5 | 5 | 5 | 5 | 6 | 6 | 6 | 7 | 9 | 7 | 7 | 6 | 6 | 6 | 6 | 6 | 7 | 7 |
| Linköpings FC | 7 | 9 | 11 | 11 | 12 | 11 | 11 | 12 | 11 | 10 | 7 | 8 | 8 | 7 | 7 | 8 | 7 | 8 | 10 | 8 | 8 | 8 | 9 | 10 | 11 | 9 |
| Växjö DFF | 10 | 7 | 5 | 4 | 5 | 7 | 8 | 9 | 7 | 7 | 8 | 9 | 9 | 10 | 8 | 9 | 8 | 9 | 8 | 9 | 9 | 9 | 8 | 9 | 10 | 8 |
| Vittsjö GIK | 14 | 8 | 10 | 8 | 6 | 8 | 9 | 7 | 8 | 9 | 11 | 11 | 11 | 9 | 10 | 11 | 11 | 10 | 9 | 10 | 10 | 10 | 10 | 8 | 8 | 10 |
| IF Brommapojkarna | 8 | 11 | 6 | 9 | 9 | 9 | 7 | 8 | 9 | 8 | 10 | 10 | 10 | 11 | 11 | 10 | 10 | 11 | 11 | 11 | 11 | 11 | 11 | 11 | 9 | 11 |
| KIF Örebro DFF | 11 | 13 | 13 | 13 | 14 | 14 | 13 | 13 | 13 | 13 | 13 | 13 | 13 | 13 | 13 | 13 | 13 | 12 | 12 | 12 | 12 | 12 | 12 | 13 | 13 | 13 |
| AIK | 12 | 14 | 14 | 14 | 11 | 12 | 12 | 10 | 12 | 12 | 12 | 12 | 12 | 12 | 12 | 12 | 12 | 13 | 13 | 13 | 13 | 13 | 13 | 12 | 12 | 12 |
| Trelleborgs FF | 13 | 12 | 12 | 12 | 13 | 13 | 14 | 14 | 14 | 14 | 14 | 14 | 14 | 14 | 14 | 14 | 14 | 14 | 14 | 14 | 14 | 14 | 14 | 14 | 14 | 14 |

| Leader and Champions League second round |
| Champions League second round |
| Champions League first round |
| Relegation play-offs |
| Elitettan |

Updated to match(es) played on 28 December 2024. Source:

=== Results by round ===
| Team ╲ Round | 1 | 2 | 3 | 4 | 5 | 6 | 7 | 8 | 9 | 10 | 11 | 12 | 13 | 14 | 15 | 16 | 17 | 18 | 19 | 20 | 21 | 22 | 23 | 24 | 25 | 26 |
|---|---|---|---|---|---|---|---|---|---|---|---|---|---|---|---|---|---|---|---|---|---|---|---|---|---|---|
| AIK | L | L | L | L | W | L | L | W | L | D | W | L | L | D | L | L | L | L | L | D | W | D | D | W | W | W |
| Djurgårdens IF | W | D | W | L | L | W | W | D | W | L | L | L | W | L | L | D | L | D | W | D | W | D | D | L | L | L |
| BK Häcken | W | D | W | W | W | L | W | W | D | W | W | W | W | D | W | L | D | W | W | L | W | W | W | W | W | W |
| Hammarby | W | W | W | W | W | W | L | L | L | W | W | W | W | W | W | W | W | L | W | W | W | D | W | W | W | W |
| IF Brommapojkarna | D | L | W | L | D | W | W | L | L | D | L | D | L | L | W | W | D | L | L | D | L | L | L | W | W | L |
| Kristianstads DFF | W | L | L | W | W | W | W | W | D | W | W | D | L | L | D | L | W | W | W | W | W | L | D | W | W | W |
| Linköpings FC | D | D | L | L | L | W | L | L | W | W | W | L | W | W | L | D | D | L | L | W | L | D | L | L | L | W |
| IFK Norrköping | L | D | W | W | L | W | W | W | L | L | D | L | W | W | L | D | W | W | L | D | D | W | L | W | L | L |
| KIF Örebro DFF | L | L | L | L | L | L | D | L | W | D | L | L | L | D | W | L | L | W | L | W | L | D | W | L | L | L |
| Piteå IF | W | D | L | L | D | L | D | L | W | L | W | W | W | D | L | W | D | W | L | L | L | D | W | L | W | L |
| FC Rosengård | W | W | W | W | W | W | W | W | W | W | W | W | W | W | W | W | W | W | W | W | W | W | W | L | W | W |
| Trelleborgs FF | L | D | L | L | L | L | L | L | L | D | L | L | L | L | L | L | L | L | L | L | L | D | L | L | L | L |
| Växjö DFF | L | W | W | W | L | L | L | D | W | L | L | D | L | W | W | D | D | L | W | L | L | D | D | L | L | W |
| Vittsjö GIK | L | W | L | W | W | L | L | W | L | L | L | D | D | L | D | W | D | D | W | L | D | L | L | W | L | L |

Updated to match(es) played on 22 November 2024. Source: svenskfotboll.se (in Swedish)
W = Win; D = Draw; L = Lose

== Player statistics ==
=== Top scorers ===
As of matches played on 9 November 2024

| Rank | Player | Club | Goals |
|---|---|---|---|
| 1 | (Japan) Momoko Tanikawa | FC Rosengård | 16 |
| 2 | (Norway) Cathinka Tandberg | Hammarby (Note: 4 goals scored for Linköpings FC.) | 15 |
| 2 | (Iceland) Hlín Eiríksdóttir | Kristianstads DFF | 15 |
| 4 | (Sweden) Ellen Wangerheim | Hammarby | 13 |
| 4 | (Denmark) Olivia Holdt | FC Rosengård | 13 |
| 6 | (Sweden) Felicia Schröder | BK Häcken | 12 |
| 6 | (Japan) Mai Kadowaki | FC Rosengård | 12 |
| 6 | (Germany) Rebecca Knaak | FC Rosengård | 12 |
| 9 | (Norway) Sara Kanutte Fornes | IFK Norrköping | 11 |
| 9 | (United States) Tabby Tindell | BK Häcken (Note: 7 goals scored for Kristianstads DFF.) | 11 |
| 11 | (Sweden) Olivia Schough | FC Rosengård | 10 |

==== Hat-tricks ====
| Player | For | Against | Result | Date |
|---|---|---|---|---|
| (Sweden) Felicia Schröder | BK Häcken | IFK Norrköping | 4-3 (H) | 13 April 2024 |
| (Sweden) Adelisa Grabus | AIK | Trelleborgs FF | 1-5 (A) | 9 May 2024 |
| (Norway) Vilde Hasund^{4} | Hammarby | Trelleborgs FF | 5-0 (H) | 16 June 2024 |
| (Denmark) Olivia Holdt | FC Rosengård | Trelleborgs FF | 1-9 (A) | 26 June 2024 |
| (Finland) Ria Öling | FC Rosengård | Trelleborgs FF | 8-1 (H) | 30 June 2024 |
| (Norway) Cathinka Tandberg | Hammarby | FC Rosengård | 2-3 (A) | 20 October 2024 |
| (Australia) Remy Siemsen | Kristianstads DFF | Trelleborgs FF | 0-5 (A) | 9 November 2024 |

Notes

^{4} Player scored 4 goals
(H) – Home team
(A) – Away team

=== Clean sheets ===
As of matches played on 24 November 2024

| Rank | Player | Club | Clean sheets |
|---|---|---|---|
| 1 | (Scotland) Eartha Cumings | Rosengård | 19 |
| 2 | (Finland) Anna Tamminen | Hammarby | 14 |
| 3 | (Sweden) Jennifer Falk | Häcken | 11 |
| 4 | (Sweden) Elin Vaughan | Vittsjö | 9 |
| 5 | (Finland) Anna Koivunen | Brommapojkarna | 8 |
| 6 | (Sweden) Moa Öhman | Piteå | 7 |
| 6 | (Sweden) Cajsa Andersson | Linköping | 7 |
| 8 | (Sweden) Elvira Björklund | Djurgården | 6 |
| 8 | (Sweden) Moa Olsson | Kristianstad | 6 |
| 10 | (Denmark) Maja Bay Østergaard | Växjö | 5 |
| 11 | (Sweden) Moa Edrud | Hammarby | 4 |
| 11 | (Sweden) Sofia Hjern | Norrköping | 4 |
| 11 | (Sweden) Clara Ekstrand | Örebro | 4 |
| 11 | (United States) Samantha Murphy | Piteå | 4 |
| 15 | (Netherlands) Loes Geurts | Häcken | 3 |
| 16 | (United States) Katelin Talbert | Djurgården | 2 |
| 16 | (Colombia) Vendela Persbeck | AIK | 2 |
| 16 | (Australia) Jada Mathyssen-Whyman | AIK | 2 |
| 16 | (United States) Caroline DeLisle | Norrköping | 2 |
| 20 | (Sweden) Somea Položen | Trelleborg | 1 |
| 20 | (United States) Brett Maron | Kristianstad | 1 |

=== Discipline ===
As of matches played on 9 November 2024

==== Player ====
- Most yellow cards: 11
  - (Sweden) Nellie Persson (Vittsjö)

==== Club ====
- Most yellow cards: 35
  - AIK

==== Player ====
- Most red cards: 1
  - (Sweden) Selina Henriksson (Piteå)

==== Club ====
- Most red cards: 1
  - Piteå

== Awards ==
=== Monthly awards ===
| Month | Player of the Month | | Other nominated players | | | |
| Month | Player | Club | Player | Club | Player | Club |
|---|---|---|---|---|---|---|
| April | (Japan) Momoko Tanikawa | FC Rosengård | (Japan) Shinomi Koyama | Djurgårdens IF | (Norway) Sara Kanutte Fornes | IFK Norrköping |
| May | (Iceland) Gudrun Arnardottir | FC Rosengård | (Denmark) Johanna Fossdalsá Sørensen | BK Häcken | (Iceland) Hlin Eiriksdottir | Kristianstads DFF |
| June | (Germany) Rebecca Knaak | FC Rosengård | (Iceland) Hlin Eiriksdottir | Kristianstads DFF | (Sweden) Selina Henriksson | Piteå IF |
| July | —N/a | | | | | |
| August | (Sweden) Caroline Seger | FC Rosengård | (Sweden) Ellen Wangerheim | Hammarby IF | (Finland) Anna Koivunen | IF Brommapojkarna |
| September | (Norway) Cathinka Tandberg | Hammarby IF | (Japan) Mai Kadowaki | FC Rosengård | (Iceland) Hlin Eiriksdottir | Kristianstads DFF |
| October | (Sweden) Beata Olsson | AIK | (Norway) Cathinka Tandberg | Hammarby IF | (Sweden) Anna Anvegård | BK Häcken |

=== Seasonal awards ===
| Award | Winner | Club |
|---|---|---|
| Most Valuable Player | (Sweden) Caroline Seger | FC Rosengård |
| Best Goalkeeper | (Scotland) Eartha Cumings | FC Rosengård |
| Best Defender | (Germany) Rebecca Knaak | FC Rosengård |
| Best Midfielder | (Japan) Momoko Tanikawa | FC Rosengård |
| Best Striker | (Norway) Cathinka Tandberg | Hammarby IF |
| Coach of the Season | (Sweden) Joel Kjetselberg | FC Rosengård |
| Goal of the Season | (Norway) Cathinka Tandberg | Hammarby IF |
| Sportbladetpriset | (Sweden) Caroline Seger | FC Rosengård |
