= Hanna Andersson =

American clothing company

- Company type: Private
- Industry: Retail
- Founded: 1983
- Founder: Gun Denhart, Tom Denhart
- Headquarters: Portland, Oregon, USA
- Key people: Aimée Lapic (CEO)
- Products: Children's clothing
- Owner: L Catterton
- Number of employees: 400
- Website: www.hannaandersson.com

Hanna Andersson is a Portland, Oregon-based corporation that specializes in children's apparel. The company operates online and mail-order in the United States and ships to almost 200 countries around the world.

== History ==
In 1983, Swedish-born Gun Denhart founded the company in Portland, Oregon, in the garage of her home. The company began as an exclusively mail-order catalog retailer; Hanna Andersson mailed out its first catalog in 1984. Co-founder Tom Denhart would remain the company's creative director until 1995. The first brick-and-mortar store opened in 1990, but now operates as an online only retailer.

In 1995, the Denharts hired Phil Iosca as CEO/President. He refocused the company on young children's apparel. Then, in 2001, the Denharts sold the company for $175 million. Following the initial sale, Hanna Andersson was sold to a succession of private equity firms and purchased by Sun Capital Partners. Gun Denhart remained on the Board of Directors until 2007. When Iosca retired in 2010, then-COO Adam Stone was named the new CEO of the company.

In August 2016, Hanna Andersson was sold to L Catterton for an undisclosed amount. The company's executive team was kept intact. In 2022, Aimée Lapic was named as the CEO of Hanna Andersson.

== Philanthropy and company policies ==
The company has received notable attention over the years due to Denhart's advocacy of progressive workplace policies. Denhart's initiatives included family-friendly employment policies in support of work-family balance and the charitable donation of 5% of the company's pre-tax profits to groups working for children's welfare. These efforts, along with Denhart's other work, led the Oregon Commission of Women to name her the "Woman of Achievement" for 2013. The company's "HannaHelps" program also garnered attention for awarding yearly grants to schools and non-profit groups serving children throughout the United States.

== Products ==
Hanna Andersson manufactures clothing for babies, toddlers, kids, and women. Over 60% of the company's products are OEKO-TEX Standard 100 certified and many items are made with organic cotton. In 2014, the company expanded its offerings to include home décor and bedding. Currently the brand focuses on high-quality clothing and pajamas for babies, toddlers, kids, and adults and was and is known for bright, happy designs and matching family pajamas.
