= Emma Pennsäter =

Swedish footballer

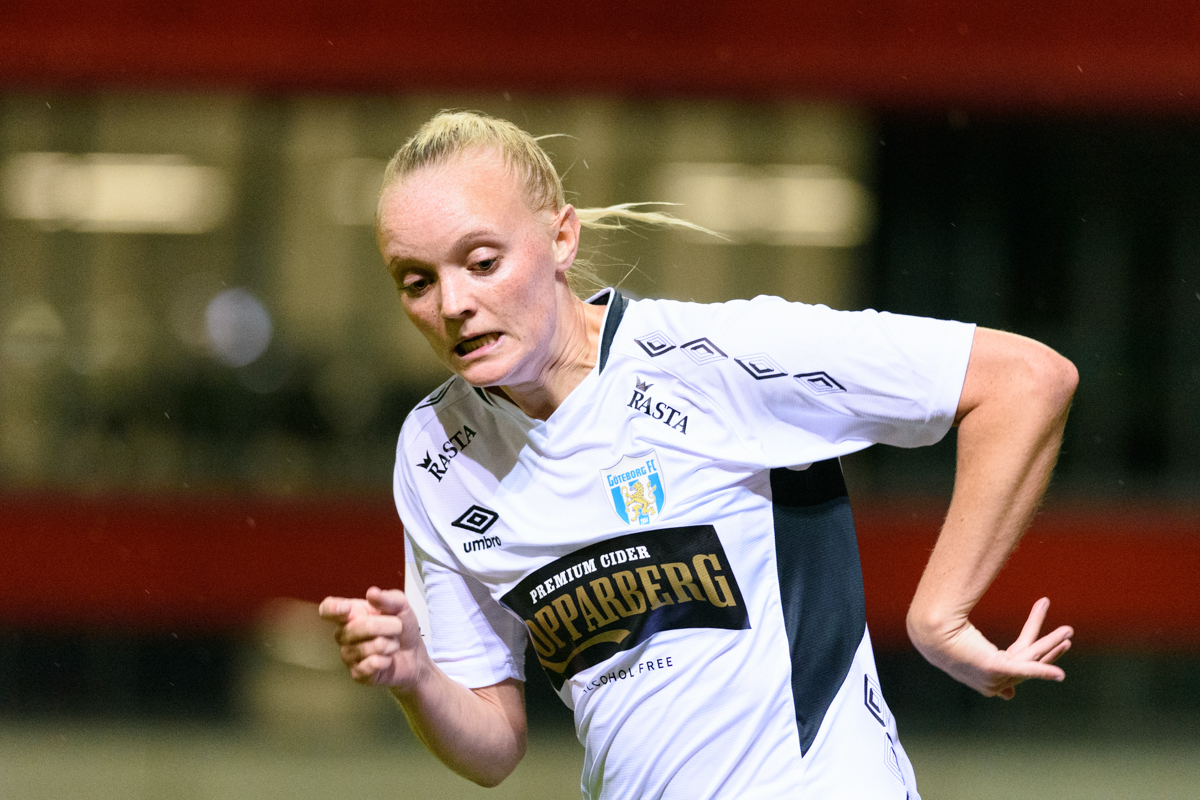
- Pennsäter in 2019

Personal information
- Full name: Emma Anna Marianne Pennsäter
- Date of birth: 29 November 1997 (age 28)
- Place of birth: Malmö, Sweden
- Position: Defender

Team information
- Current team: FC Rosengård
- Number: 4

Senior career*
Years	Team	Apps	(Gls)
2012	IF Limhamn Bunkeflo	0	(0)
2014–2017	FC Rosengård	13	(0)
2017–2018	→ Brøndby (loan)	23	(0)
2018–2019	Kopparbergs/Göteborg FC	20	(0)
2020	Vittsjö GIK	22	(1)
2021–2024	Växjö DFF	51	(2)

International career^{‡}
2013–2014	Sweden U17	4	(0)
2015–2016	Sweden U19	8	(0)
2017–2020	Sweden U23	22	(0)
- * Club domestic league appearances and goals as of 15:17, 4 May 2023 (UTC) ‡ National team caps and goals as of 10:58, 15 December 2018 (UTC)

Emma Anna Marianne Pennsäter (born 29 November 1997) is a Swedish footballer who plays as a defender for FC Rosengård. She began her professional career with FC Rosengård and was sent on loan to Brøndby IF of the Danish Elitedivisionen in July 2017.

== Honours ==
Rosengård

Winner

- Damallsvenskan (2): 2014, 2015
- Svenska Supercupen: 2015

Runner-up

- Svenska Cupen: 2014–15

Brøndby

Winner

- Kvindepokalen: 2017–18

Runner-up

- Elitedivisionen: 2017–18
