= Jo-Anne Cronquist =

Swedish footballer (born 2004

Personal information
- Full name: Emma Jo-Anne Agbor-Tataw Cronquist
- Date of birth: 6 October 2004 (age 22)
- Place of birth: Sweden
- Position: Defensive midfielder

Team information
- Current team: FC Rosengård
- Number: 44

Youth career
- Hörby FF
- Askeröds IF
- 2014–2021: FC Rosengård

Senior career*
Years	Team	Apps	(Gls)
2021–	FC Rosengård	62	(0)
2021–2024	→ FC Rosengård 1917	23	(4)

International career^{‡}
2019	Sweden U17	1	(0)
2022–2023	Sweden U19	12	(1)
2025–	Sweden U23	1	(0)
- * Club domestic league appearances and goals as of 3 September 2026 ‡ National team caps and goals as of 3 September 2026

Emma Jo-Anne Agbor-Tataw Cronquist (born 6 October 2004) is a Swedish professional footballer who plays as a defensive midfielder for Damallsvenskan club FC Rosengård.

== Club career ==
Cronquist began her career with Hörby FF and Askeröds IF before moving to the academy of FC Rosengård. Following a promotion to the senior team and establishing herself within the team, Cronquist's contract was extended on 8 January 2025. Two months later she scored her first senior goal, a late equalizer in the first ever derby match between FC Rosengård and Malmö FF.

== International career ==
Cronquist is a youth international for Sweden.
