= Thea Sørbo =

Norwegian football player (born 2003)

Personal information
- Full name: Thea Helene Gammelgaard Sørbo
- Date of birth: 28 March 2003 (age 23)
- Position: Right-back

Team information
- Current team: FC Rosengård
- Number: 7

Youth career
- Nesodden IF
- Lyn

Senior career*
Years	Team	Apps	(Gls)
2020–2022	Kolbotn	39	(0)
2023–2025	Hammarby IF	35	(2)
2025	→ UD Tenerife (loan)	13	(0)
2025–	FC Rosengård	0	(0)

International career^{‡}
2018	Norway U15	1	(0)
2019	Norway U16	15	(3)
2020	Norway U17	2	(0)
2021–2022	Norway U19	14	(2)
2022–	Norway U23	6	(0)
2023–	Norway	1	(0)
- * Club domestic league appearances and goals as of 21 November 2024 ‡ National team caps and goals as of 11 November 2023

Thea Helene Gammelgaard Sørbo (born 28 March 2003) is a Norwegian footballer who plays as a right-back for the Swedish club Rosengård and the Norway national team.

== Club career ==
=== Kolbotn ===
Sørbo played youth and junior football in Nesoddens IF and Lyn. In 2019, she made her debut in senior football, making nine appearances for Lyn's 2nd team in the Norwegian Second Division, the domestic third tier.

In 2020, she moved to Kolbotn where she made her debut in Toppserien, the domestic top tier. On 14 October 2021, after establishing herself as a starter, she signed her first senior contract with Kolbotn, running until the end of August 2023.

=== Hammarby IF ===
On 9 January 2023, Sørbo signed a three-year contract with the Swedish club Hammarby IF. On 6 June the same year, Hammarby won the 2022–23 Svenska Cupen. Sørbo appeared in the final, that ended in a 3–0 win at home against BK Häcken. The club also won the 2023 Damallsvenskan, claiming its second Swedish championship after 38 years, with Sørbo making 14 league appearances.

=== FC Rosengård ===
On 2 August 2025, Sørbo signed a two and a half-year contract with the Swedish club Rosengård.

== International career ==
Sørbo has played international matches for the U15, U16, U17, U19, and the U23 national teams of Norway.

She was part of the Norwegian U19 national team that won the silver medal in the 2022 Under-19 European Championship.

In November 2022, she was selected for the senior Norwegian national team for the first time. On 18 February 2023, she made her senior debut for Norway in a 0–2 friendly loss against Denmark.

== Honours ==
Hammarby IF

- Svenska Cupen: 2022–23
- Damallsvenskan: 2023
