= Anastasiya Pobegaylo =

Belarusian footballer

Personal information
- Date of birth: 23 January 2004 (age 22)
- Place of birth: Lyakhavichy, Belarus
- Height: 1.61 m (5 ft 3 in)
- Position: Forward

Team information
- Current team: Rosengård
- Number: 23

Senior career*
Years	Team	Apps	(Gls)
2020–2022	Minsk	67	(65)
2023–2025	Fortuna Hjørring	53	(14)
2025–	Rosengård	6	(1)

International career^{‡}
2019	Belarus U17	6	(2)
2021	Belarus U19	3	(2)
2020–	Belarus	5	(0)
- * Club domestic league appearances and goals as of 24 April 2025 ‡ National team caps and goals as of 22 September 2020

Anastasiya Anatolyevna Pobegaylo (Note: Belarusian: Анастасія Анатолеўна Пабягайла, romanized: Anastasija Anatolieŭna Pabiahajla, Russian: Анастасия Анатольевна Побегайло, romanized: Anastasiya Anatol'yevna Pobegaylo) (born 23 January 2004) is a Belarusian footballer who plays as a forward for Damallsvenskan club FC Rosengård and the Belarus national team.

== International goals ==
No.	Date	Venue	Opponent	Score	Result	Competition
1.	8 June 2021	Spartak Stadium, Mogilev, Belarus	Iran	6–0	6–0	Friendly
