= Emilia Larsson =

Swedish footballer (born 1998)

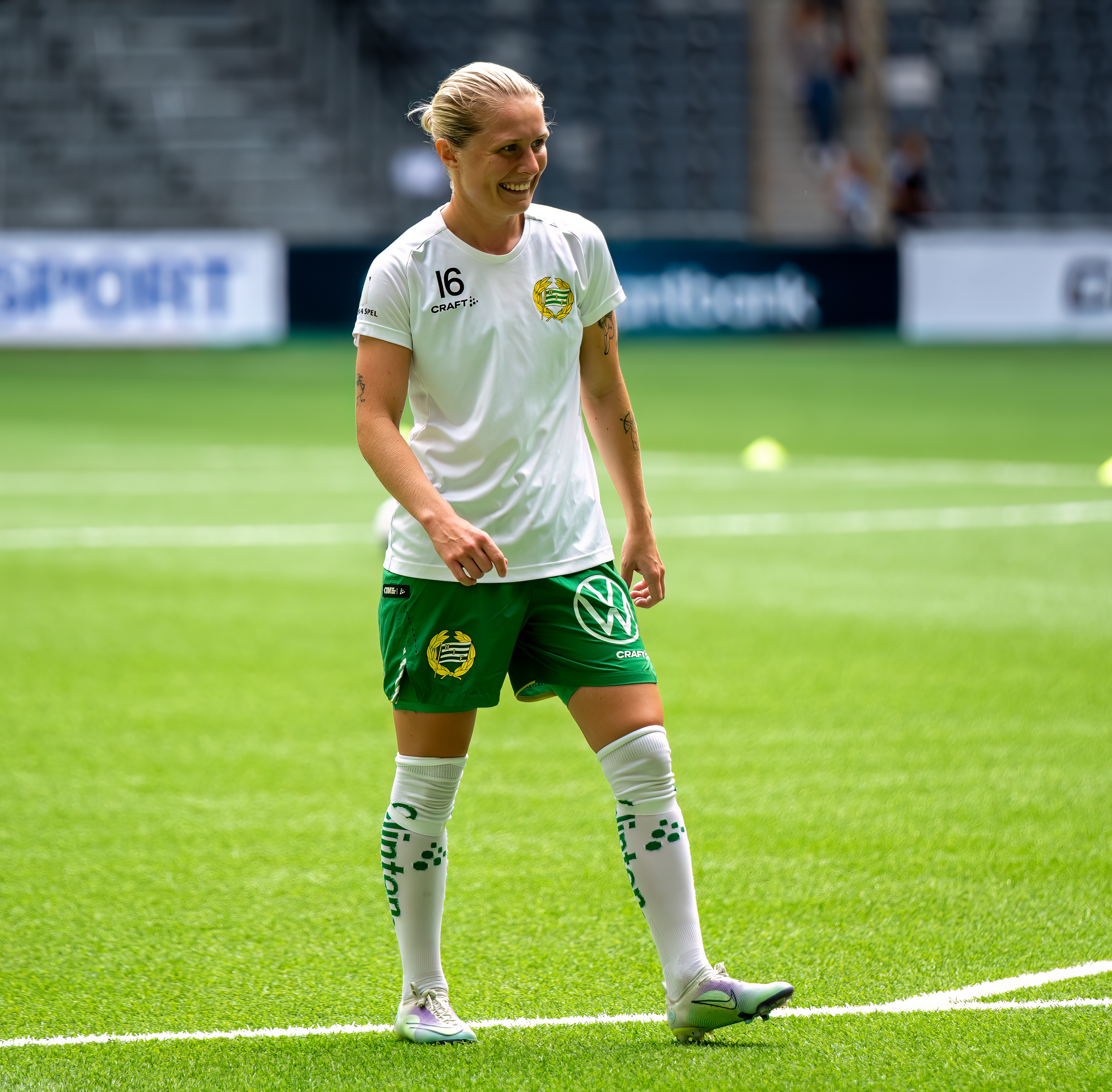

Personal information
- Date of birth: 13 July 1998 (age 28)
- Place of birth: Linköping, Sweden
- Height: 1.61 m (5 ft 3 in)
- Position: Midfielder

Team information
- Current team: Newcastle United
- Number: 14

Youth career
- IK Östria Lambohov
- Linköpings FC

Senior career*
Years	Team	Apps	(Gls)
2014–2016	Linköpings FC	11	(1)
2017–2018	IFK Norrköping		
2019–2023	Hammarby IF	98	(43)
2023–2026	FC Rosengård	74	(6)
2026–	Newcastle United	4	(0)

International career
2014	Sweden U17	5	(2)
2021–2022	Sweden U23	7	(1)
- * Club domestic league appearances and goals as of 4 February 2026

Emilia Larsson (Swedish: [eˈmiːlɪa ˈlɑ̌ːʂɔn]; born 13 July 1998) is a Swedish professional footballer who plays as a midfielder for Women's Super League 2 club Newcastle United.

== Career ==
Larsson signed for FC Rosengård in January 2023, moving from fellow Damallsvenskan club Hammarby. She made a total of 135 appearances for Rosengård.

On 19 January 2026, Larsson was announced at Women's Super League 2 club Newcastle United following the expiry of her contract with FC Rosengård. Speaking about Larsson, Newcastle manager Tanya Oxtoby said "She can score and create opportunities off both feet and brings pace to the forward line. She will add valuable experience to our group, and we are looking forward to welcoming her to the club."

== Personal life ==
She is currently in a same-sex relationship with Cornelia Kapocs, another Swedish footballer of Hungarian origin.

== Honours ==
Linköping FC

- Svenska Cupen (2): 2013–14, 2014–15
- Svenska Supercupen Runner-up: 2015

FC Rosengård

- Damallsvenskan: 2024
