= AIK Fotboll (women) =

AIK
- Full name: Allmänna Idrottsklubben Fotboll Damer
- Nickname: Gnaget (The Gnaw)
- Short name: AIK
- Founded: 1970; 56 years ago
- Ground: Skytteholms IP, Stockholm
- Capacity: 1,300
- Chairman: Robert Falck
- Head Coach: Lukas Syberyjski
- League: Damallsvenskan
- 2025: Damallsvenskan, 8th of 14
- Website: AIK
Home colours	Away colours

AIK Fotboll Dam (Swedish: [aːiːkoː fuːˌβ̞ɔl dɑːm]), internationally known as AIK Solna or AIK Stockholm, is a Swedish professional women's association football club from Stockholm, currently competing in the Damallsvenskan. The team, a section of AIK, is affiliated to the Stockholms Fotbollförbund and plays in the Skytteholms IP in Solna, Stockholm.

Founded in 1970, AIK first earned promotion to the Damallsvenskan in 1992, and avoided relegation for two seasons before ending second to last in 1995. A decade passed before the team was back for the 2005 season. AIK was promptly relegated but earned its third promotion the next year. The following years marked the team's major successes yet, with AIK reaching the national Cup's final in 2007, which they lost 4–3 against Umeå IK, and ending 4th in 2008. After four years in top flight AIK was relegated in 2010 but recovered the category for the 2012 season after topping the Swedish First Division's Norrettan Group. They were relegated to the Norrettan after the 2012 season after finishing in last position. They regained promotion to the Damallsvenskan the following season. They were relegated to the Elitettan, the Swedish second division in 2015.

== Players ==
=== Current squad ===
As of 2 September 2026

Note: Flags indicate national team as defined under FIFA eligibility rules; some limited exceptions apply. Players may hold more than one non-FIFA nationality.

No.	Pos.	Nation	Player
3	DF	SWE	Thindra Mattsson
4	DF	SWE	Jennie Nordin (captain)
5	MF	JPN	Haruna Tabata
6	MF	SWE	Felicia Saving
7	MF	SWE	Ellie Junetoft
8	MF	DEN	Dajan Hashemi
9	FW	KOS	Loreta Kullashi
10	MF	SWE	Nova Selin
11	MF	SWE	Ida Björnberg
12	FW	SWE	Klara Ahnberg
13	MF	SWE	Daniella Famili
14	FW	BIH	Adelisa Grabus
15	FW	ISL	Ásdís Halldórsdóttir

No.	Pos.	Nation	Player
17	DF	SWE	Janelle Yilmaz
18	GK	SWE	Agnekil
19	MF	SWE	Olivia Bodin
20	FW	POL	Aleksandra Bogucka
21	GK	FIN	Emilia Dannbäck
22	DF	SWE	Anna Oscarsson
23	MF	SWE	Ella Reidy
24	FW	FIN	Lotta Kalske
25	MF	SWE	Olivia Lindstedt
26	DF	SWE	Julia Ragnarsson
28	FW	POL	Zofia Cendrowska
29	DF	SWE	Matilda Plan
30	DF	SWE	Fanny Ahlin

=== Out on loan ===
Note: Flags indicate national team as defined under FIFA eligibility rules; some limited exceptions apply. Players may hold more than one non-FIFA nationality.

No.	Pos.	Nation	Player
16	MF	SWE	Nellie Eriksen Yasseri (at KIF Örebro DFF until 31 December 2026)

=== Former players ===
Selection of players who have played in AIK.

Name	Number of seasons	Seasons	Matches	Goals
(Sweden) Amanda Nildén	1	2017	25	3
(Finland) Anne Mäkinen	2	2008-2009	?	?
(Sweden) Filippa Angeldal	2	2014-2015	36	5
(Japan) Honoka Hayashi	2	2021-2022	36	7
(Finland) Jessica Julin	2	2007-2008	?	?
(Sweden) Julia Zigiotti Olme	1	2015	21	4
(Australia) Kathryn Gill	1	2008	16	4
(Sweden) Linda Sembrant	3	2008-2010	62	6
(Australia) Lisa De Vanna	1	2008	19	15
(Sweden) Nathalie Björn	2	2014-2015	34	0
(Sweden) Rosa Kafaji	3	2019-2021	49	19

For details of current and former players, see Category:AIK Fotboll (women) players.

== Honours ==
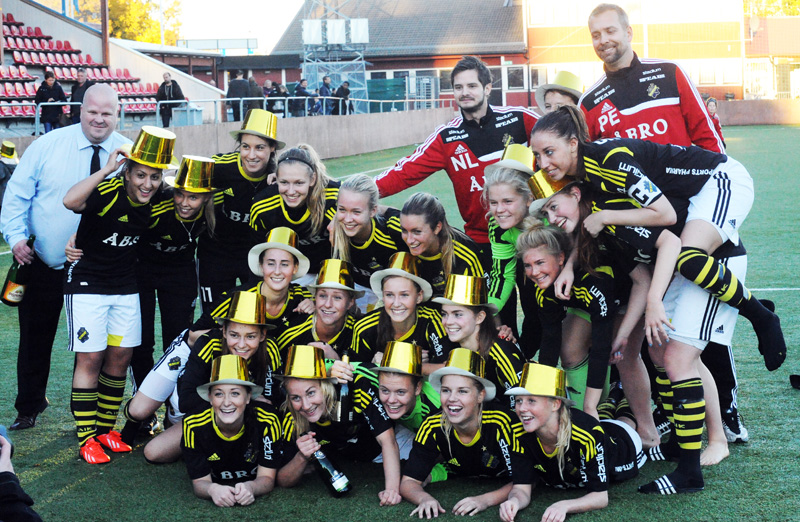
AIK celebrating promotion to the Damallsvenskan after winning the 2013 Elitettan

- Elitettan (Tier 2)
  - Winners (1): 2020

Svenska cupen 2007: Runners-up

== Attendances ==
In recent seasons AIK Fotboll Dam have had the following average attendances:

Season	Average attendance	Division/section	Level
2011	215	Norrettan	Tier 2
2012	513	Damallsvenskan	Tier 1
2013	316	Elitettan	Tier 2
2014	605	Damallsvenskan	Tier 1
2015	510	Damallsvenskan	Tier 1
2016	243	Elitettan	Tier 2
2017	272	Elitettan	Tier 2
2018	260	Elitettan	Tier 2
2019	457	Elitettan	Tier 2
2020	0	Elitettan	Tier 2
2021	218	Damallsvenskan	Tier 1
2022	451	Damallsvenskan	Tier 1
2023	416	Elitettan	Tier 2
2024	607	Damallsvenskan	Tier 1
2025	802	Damallsvenskan	Tier 1

* Attendances are provided in the Svenska Fotbollförbundet website.

== Records ==
- Victory, Stockholmsserien klass 1: 15–0 vs. KFUM Söder (14 October 1973)
- Loss, Division 1, Norra: 0–13 vs. Djurgårdens IF (7 May 1996)
- Most appearances: 378, (Sweden) Marie Nyberg
- Most goals scored: 89, (Finland) Ulla-Riita Kaasinen

== See also ==
- AIK Fotboll (men's team)
