= Adelisa Grabus =

Swedish footballer

Personal information
- Date of birth: May 26, 1996 (age 30)
- Place of birth: Västerås, Sweden
- Position: Forward

Team information
- Current team: AIK
- Number: 14

Youth career
- 2001–2012: Arboga Södra
- 2012: KIF Örebro DFF

Senior career*
| Years | Team | Apps | (Gls) |
| 2013–2018 | KIF Örebro DFF | 48 | (6) |
| 2019 | Växjö DFF | 9 | (0) |
| 2020– | AIK | 80 | (51) |

International career^{‡}
| 2012–2013 | Sweden U17 | 6 | (1) |
| 2023– | Bosnia and Herzegovina | 1 | (0) |
- * Club domestic league appearances and goals as of 4 May 2024 ‡ National team caps and goals as of 4 May 2024

Adelisa Grabus (born 26 May 1996) is a Swedish football forward of Bosnian decent who plays for AIK in the Swedish Damallsvenskan and for the Bosnia and Herzegovina national team.

== Honours ==
=== Club ===
KIF Örebro DFF

Runner-up

- Damallsvenskan: 2014

AIK

Winners

- Elitettan: 2020, 2023

=== International ===
Sweden U17

Runner-up

- UEFA Women's Under-17 Championship: 2013
