= 2021 Damallsvenskan =

Damallsvenskan
- Season: 2021
- Champions: FC Rosengård
- Relegated: Växjö DFF
- Champions League: FC Rosengård; BK Häcken; Kristianstad
- Matches: 132
- Goals: 355 (2.69 per match)
- Top goalscorer: Stina Blackstenius (17 goals)
- Biggest home win: BK Häcken 10–0 AIK (20 June 2021)
- Biggest away win: AIK 0–7 Rosengård (25 May 2021)
- Highest scoring: BK Häcken 10–0 AIK (20 June 2021); Vittsjö 8-2 Örebro (6 November 2021)
- Longest winning run: 7 matches Rosengård
- Longest unbeaten run: 17 matches Rosengård
- Longest winless run: 18 matches Växjö
- Longest losing run: 6 matches Djurgårdens IF
- All statistics correct as of 6 November 2021.

The 2021 Damallsvenskan was the 34th season of the Swedish women's association football top division, Damallsvenskan. The league began on 17 April 2021, and ended on 6 November 2021.

Hammarby and AIK returned to the top tier after 2 years and 5 years in Elitettan respectively.

All matches are viewed worldwide, except for Mexico, for a fee at Damallsvenskan TV. Aftonbladet have bought broadcasting rights for all Damallsvenskan matches from 2020 to 2022 and will have them available at Sportbladet Play.

== Summary ==
The game Hammarby IF–AIK (4–1) on 10 October was played at Tele2 Arena in Stockholm, in front of 18 537 spectators, leading to a new Damallsvenskan record attendance.

== Teams ==
Location of teams in 2021 Damallsvenskan

Team	Location	Stadium	Turf	Stadium capacity^{a}
AIK	Stockholm	Skytteholms IP	Artificial	5,200
BK Häcken FF	Gothenburg	Bravida Arena	Artificial	6,500
Djurgårdens IF	Stockholm	Stockholm Olympic Stadium	Natural	14,417
Eskilstuna United DFF	Eskilstuna	Tunavallen	Artificial	7,600
FC Rosengård	Malmö	Malmö IP	Artificial	5,700
Hammarby IF	Stockholm	Hammarby IP	Artificial	3,700
KIF Örebro DFF	Örebro	Behrn Arena	Artificial	12,624
Kristianstads DFF	Kristianstad	Kristianstads fotbollsarena	Hybrid	3,080^{b}
Kristianstads DFF	Kristianstad	Vilans IP	Natural	5,000^{b}
Linköpings FC	Linköping	Arena Linköping	Artificial	8,500
Piteå IF	Piteå	LF Arena	Artificial	3,000
Vittsjö GIK	Vittsjö	Vittsjö IP	Natural	3,000
Växjö DFF	Växjö	Myresjöhus Arena	Artificial	12,173

Notes: ^{a} According to each club information page previously available at the Swedish Football Association website for Damallsvenskan, unless otherwise noted. Since May 2018 this is no longer present. Numbers were usually lower than official stadium numbers.
^{b} According to Kristianstads DFF's history web page.

== Standings ==
Pos	Team	Pld	W	D	L	GF	GA	GD	Pts	Qualification or relegation
1	FC Rosengård (C)	22	18	3	1	54	10	+44	57	Qualification to Champions League second round
2	BK Häcken	22	14	5	3	53	13	+40	47	Qualification to Champions League second round
3	Kristianstads DFF	22	9	8	5	33	26	+7	35	Qualification to Champions League first round
4	Eskilstuna United DFF	22	10	5	7	27	22	+5	35	
5	Vittsjö GIK	22	8	8	6	29	20	+9	32	
6	Linköpings FC	22	8	7	7	33	27	+6	31	
7	Hammarby	22	9	4	9	40	37	+3	31	
8	KIF Örebro DFF	22	9	3	10	25	43	−18	30	
9	Djurgårdens IF	22	6	3	13	21	38	−17	21	
10	AIK	22	5	5	12	14	48	−34	20	
11	Piteå IF	22	4	4	14	19	38	−19	16	
12	Växjö DFF (R)	22	2	5	15	7	33	−26	11	Relegation to Elitettan

Source: svenskfotboll.se
Rules for classification: 1) Points; 2) Goal difference; 3) Number of goals scored; 4) Head-to-head points; 5) Head-to-head goal difference; 6) Head-to-head away goals scored
(C) Champions; (R) Relegated

== Results ==
Home \ Away	AIK	DIF	ESK	HÄK	HAM	LIN	KRI	ORE	PIT	ROS	VIT	VÄX
AIK		1–0	0–2	0–0	2–2	1–2	1–1	2–0	0–1	0–7	1–0	1–0
Djurgårdens IF	1–2		1–0	1–4	2–1	2–2	1–4	1–0	3–0	0–2	2–2	1–0
Eskilstuna United DFF	1–0	3–1		3–2	1–1	1–0	1–1	1–2	3–0	0–2	1–1	2–1
BK Häcken	10–0	4–0	3–0		5–1	0–1	6–2	2–0	0–0	2–0	0–0	2–0
Hammarby	4–1	3–2	0–2	0–1		1–3	3–1	5–0	1–1	1–2	0–1	2–1
Linköpings FC	2–0	3–1	0–0	0–3	3–3		1–1	4–1	4–3	0–1	0–0	5–0
Kristianstads DFF	1–1	2–1	2–0	1–3	1–2	1–0		2–2	6–1	0–0	1–0	0–1
KIF Örebro DFF	2–0	1–0	1–1	0–3	2–3	2–1	0–2		2–1	0–0	1–0	4–1
Piteå IF	4–0	1–0	0–2	0–1	0–3	1–1	1–2	0–2		2–3	1–1	1–0
FC Rosengård	3–0	3–0	3–1	2–0	3–1	2–1	1–1	6–0	1–0		3–1	5–0
Vittsjö GIK	4–0	0–1	1–0	1–1	3–1	3–0	0–0	8–2	2–1	0–4		1–0
Växjö DFF	1–1	0–0	0–2	1–1	0–2	0–0	0–1	0–1	1–0	0–1	0–0	

Updated to match(es) played on 6 November 2021. Source: svenskfotboll.se (in Swedish)
Legend: Blue = home team win; Yellow = draw; Red = away team win.

=== Positions by Round ===
The table lists the positions of teams after each week of matches. In order to preserve chronological progress, any postponed matches are not included in the round at which they were originally scheduled, but added to the full round they were played immediately afterwards. For example, if a match is scheduled for round 13, but then postponed and played between rounds 16 and 17, it will be added to the standings for round 16.

Team ╲ Round	1	2	3	4	5	6	7	8	9	10	11	12	13	14	15	16	17	18	19	20	21	22
FC Rosengård	4	1	1	1	1	1	1	1	1	1	1	1	1	1	1	1	1	1	1	1	1	1
BK Häcken	3	2	2	3	3	2	2	2	2	2	2	2	2	2	2	2	2	2	2	2	2	2
Kristianstads DFF	7	4	3	2	2	3	4	4	3	3	3	4	5	5	6	5	4	4	4	3	3	3
Eskilstuna United DFF	6	3	5	6	7	8	8	9	7	6	6	5	3	3	3	3	3	3	3	4	4	4
Vittsjö GIK	1	7	6	8	5	7	7	6	6	7	7	7	7	7	7	7	7	6	6	5	6	5
Linköpings FC	11	6	8	4	4	4	3	3	5	5	5	6	6	6	5	6	6	7	8	8	7	6
Hammarby	10	11	7	7	8	6	5	5	4	4	4	3	4	4	4	4	5	5	5	6	8	7
KIF Örebro DFF	12	8	10	9	6	5	6	7	8	9	9	9	11	9	9	9	9	9	7	7	5	8
Djurgårdens IF	2	5	9	11	11	11	11	11	10	8	8	8	8	8	8	8	8	8	9	9	9	9
AIK	5	9	4	5	9	9	10	8	9	10	11	11	9	10	10	11	11	11	11	10	10	10
Piteå IF	9	12	12	10	10	10	9	10	11	11	10	10	10	11	11	10	10	10	10	11	11	11
Växjö DFF	8	10	11	12	12	12	12	12	12	12	12	12	12	12	12	12	12	12	12	12	12	12

Leader and Champions League second round
Champions League second round
Champions League first round
Elitettan

Updated to match(es) played on 6 November 2021. Source:

== Results by round ==
Team ╲ Round	1	2	3	4	5	6	7	8	9	10	11	12	13	14	15	16	17	18	19	20	21	22
AIK	D	L	W	D	L	D	L	W	L	L	L	L	D	W	L	L	L	W	L	D	W	L
Djurgårdens IF	W	L	L	L	L	L	L	W	D	W	D	W	L	W	L	D	W	L	L	L	L	L
Eskilstuna United DFF	D	W	L	D	D	L	D	L	W	W	W	W	W	W	L	W	D	W	L	L	L	W
BK Häcken	W	W	D	L	W	W	W	D	W	L	W	W	W	W	W	W	D	W	D	D	W	L
Hammarby	L	L	W	D	D	W	W	D	W	W	L	W	L	L	W	L	L	D	W	L	L	W
Linköpings FC	L	W	W	W	D	D	D	D	L	W	D	L	D	L	W	L	D	L	L	W	W	W
Kristianstads DFF	D	W	W	W	D	D	L	D	W	W	L	D	D	L	L	W	D	D	W	W	L	W
KIF Örebro DFF	L	W	L	D	W	W	L	L	L	L	D	L	L	W	W	L	W	D	W	W	W	L
Piteå IF	L	L	W	L	L	L	W	D	L	L	W	L	D	L	L	W	D	D	L	L	L	L
FC Rosengård	W	W	W	W	W	W	W	D	W	W	D	W	W	W	W	W	D	L	W	W	W	W
Vittsjö GIK	W	L	D	L	W	D	D	W	L	L	W	D	D	L	W	D	D	W	D	W	L	W
Växjö DFF	D	L	L	L	L	L	D	L	D	L	L	L	D	L	L	L	D	L	W	L	W	L

Updated to match(es) played on 6 November 2021. Source:
W = Win; D = Draw; L = Lose

== Player statistics ==
=== Top scorers ===
As of matches played on 6 November 2021.

Rank	Player	Club	Goals
1	(Sweden) Stina Blackstenius	BK Häcken	17
2	(Nigeria) Uchenna Kanu	Linköpings FC	14
3	(Sweden) Olivia Schough	FC Rosengård	12
4	(Sweden) Madelen Janogy	Hammarby	10
4	(Sweden) Felicia Rogic	Eskilstuna United DFF	10
6	(Denmark) Sanne Troelsgaard Nielsen	FC Rosengård	9
7	(Serbia) Jelena Čanković	FC Rosengård	8
7	(Sweden) Emilia Larsson	Hammarby	8
9	(Brazil) Fernanda Da Silva	Vittsjö GIK	7
9	(Sweden) Emma Jansson	Hammarby	7
9	(Sweden) Cornelia Kapocs	Linköpings FC	7
9	(Sweden) Mimmi Larsson	FC Rosengård	7
