= Hammarby IP =

Football stadium in Stockholm, Sweden

- Kanalplan
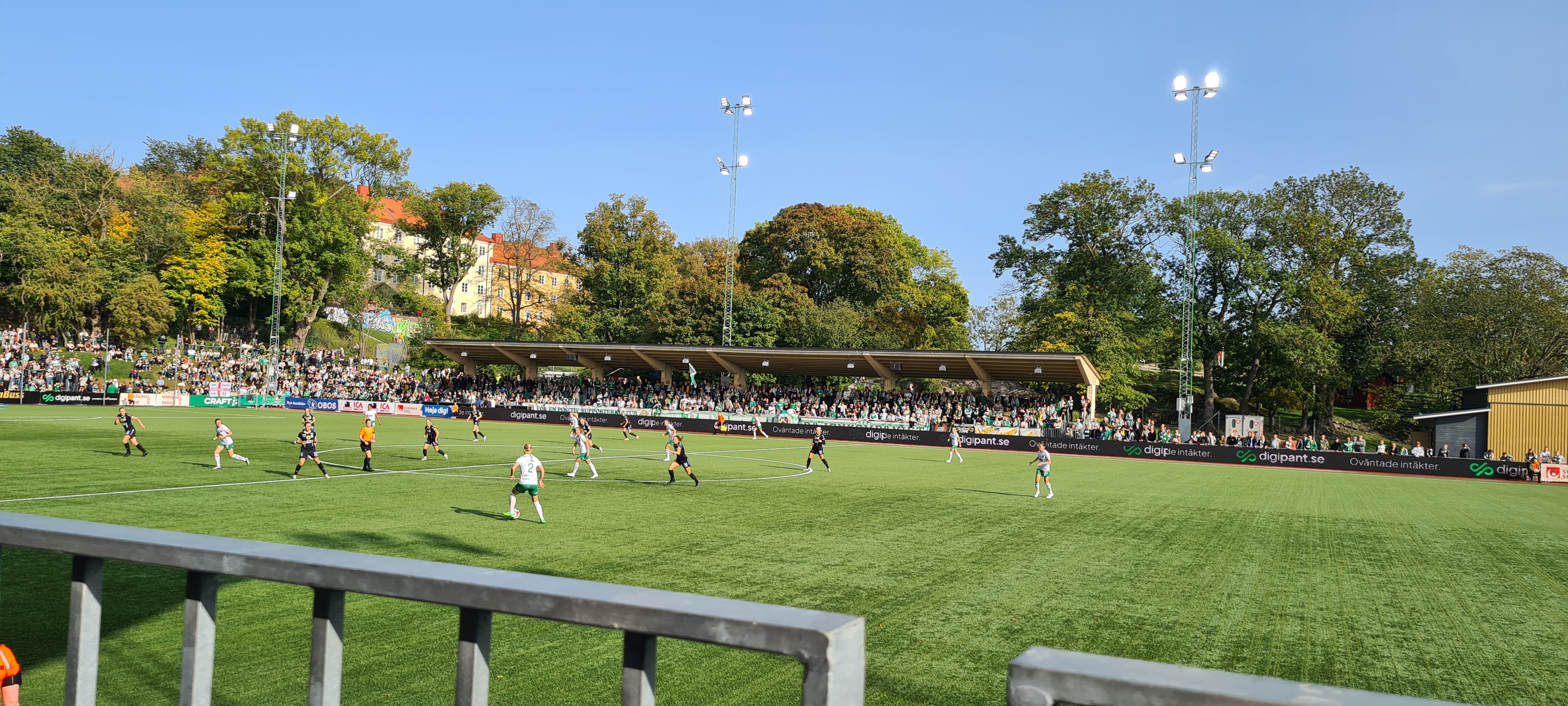
- Hammarby IP in 2023
- Interactive map of Hammarby IP
- Full name: Hammarby Idrottsplats
- Former names: Söderstadion
- Address: Södermannagatan 61, 11666 Stockholm
- Location: Stockholm, Sweden
- Coordinates: 59.306379°N 18.085037°E
- Capacity: 3,700
- Surface: Artificial turf
- Scoreboard: Yes
- Record attendance: 3,100
- Field size: 105 m × 65 m (115 yd × 71 yd)

Construction
- Opened: 12 September 1915
- Cost: 30,000 SEK (1915)

Tenants
- Hammarby IF (1915–1947); Hammarby IF (women) (1970–present); Hammarby Talang FF (2003–2011, 2021–); FC Stockholm

Hammarby IP (short for "Hammarby Idrottsplats", "Hammarby Sports Ground") also known as "Kanalplan", is a football stadium in Stockholm, Sweden. The current main tenants are FC Stockholm and the women's football team Hammarby IF.

The stadium was officially opened by Gustaf VI Adolf, at the time the crown prince of Sweden in 1915.

== Renovation ==
Due to Hammarby winning promotion to Damallsvenskan in 2014 season, it was unclear if Hammarby IF DFF still would play in Kanalplan. The stadium didn't meet the requirements for the top-tier league because of "bad condition of the field and the surrounding area".

In October 2014, it was announced that Kanalplan is planned for renovation for the upcoming season.

== Other uses ==
From the mid 1940s to 1969, the motorcycle speedway club Monarkerna raced at Hammarby IP.
