= FC Rosengård =

Women's association football club in Malmö, Sweden

- Full name: Fotboll Club Rosengård
- Nickname: The socks
- Founded: 7 September 1970; 56 years ago (as Malmö FF Dam); 12 December 2013; 12 years ago (as FC Rosengård Malmö)
- Ground: Malmö IP, Malmö
- Capacity: 7,600
- Chairman: Håkan Wifvesson
- Head coach: Joel Kjetselberg
- League: Damallsvenskan
- 2025: 11th
- Website: fcrosengard.se
Home colours	Away colours

Fotboll Club Rosengård, (Note: Swedish: [ruːsɛnɡoːrd]) formerly known as Malmö Fotbollförening Dam (Malmö FF Dam) (Note: Swedish: [ˈmâlːmøː ˈfûːtbɔlːfœˌreːnɪŋ dɑːm]) (1970–2007) and LdB FC Malmö (2007–2013), is a professional football club based in Malmö, Scania, Sweden. It is managed by multi-club ownership business Crux. It was established as Malmö FF Dam in 1970, and played seven seasons in Division 1 before moving to the Damallsvenskan league after its founding in 1988. FC Rosengård has won a record 14 league championships (most recently in 2024) and plays home games at Malmö IP in Malmö. The club it merged with, FC Rosengård 1917, has both men's and women's teams.

== History ==
On 7 September 1970 the board of Malmö FF decided to start a women's team as part of the main club. The team was called Malmö FF Dam – the word dam meaning "lady" – to distinguish the team from the men's division of the same club.

In 1986 the club won the Swedish Women's Football Division 1 for the first time. The Division 1 was Sweden's highest division until 1988 when the Damallsvenskan was formed. It took three seasons for the club to win the newly formed Damallsvenskan in 1990 and more success followed in 1991, 1993 and 1994. Malmö FF Dam would then finish as runners-up for seven consecutive seasons (from 1996 to 2002).

In April 2007, Malmö FF Dam started a rebranding of the team, including a new team name, jerseys, and logo. The team was renamed LdB FC Malmö on 11 April 2007. This meant that the club fully withdrew from Malmö FF and became a club of its own. The change of name was related to a 24 million SEK sponsorship deal with Swedish skincare firm Hardford; whose leading brand Lait de Beauté (literally "beauty milk" in French) became the name of the club.

Under the LdB FC Malmö name, the club won the Damallsvenskan championship in 2010, which qualified them for the 2011–12 UEFA Women's Champions League. A successful title defense campaign followed in the 2011 season. In the final match of the 2012 season they suffered a home defeat (0–1) to Tyresö FF, the result meant Tyresö FF were champions due to better goal difference. In 2013, they clinched the title once again, with a (2–3) win away against Tyresö FF being the turning point of the season.

In October 2013, LdB FC Malmö merged with FC Rosengård 1917, adopting the name of the latter. The Damallsvenskan title wins of 2014 and 2015 added to the 2013 title (as LdB FC Malmö), made the club three times in a row title winners for the first time in its history.

== Squad ==
As of 10 July 2026

Note: Flags indicate national team as defined under FIFA eligibility rules; some limited exceptions apply. Players may hold more than one non-FIFA nationality.

No.	Pos.	Nation	Player
1	GK	SWE	Moa Edrud
2	DF	SWE	Klara Svensson Senelius
3	DF	JPN	Ran Iwai
4	DF	SWE	Emma Pennsäter
5	DF	FIN	Anni Hartikainen
6	MF	FIN	Ria Laihonen
7	MF	NOR	Thea Sørbo
8	DF	FIN	Elli Pikkujämsä
9	MF	SWE	Hanna Andersson
10	FW	AUS	Remy Siemsen
11	MF	SWE	Molly Johansson
13	GK	USA	Samantha Leshnak Murphy
15	DF	ENG	Cecily Wellesley-Smith (on loan from Arsenal)
18	FW	CAN	Amanda West (on loan from Houston Dash)

No.	Pos.	Nation	Player
19	FW	SWE	Maja Johansson
20	MF	AUS	Isabel Gomez
21	FW	SWE	Stella Malmros
23	MF	BLR	Anastasiya Pobegaylo
24	FW	NGR	Anam Imo
26	FW	AUS	Bryleeh Henry
40	DF	SWE	Sara Sulaiman
41	MF	SWE	Saga Kristell
43	GK	SWE	Saga Andersson
44	DF	SWE	Jo-Anne Cronquist
45	MF	SWE	Tilde Björklund
47	FW	SWE	Filippa Sjöström
49	DF	SWE	Alice Enehov
51	MF	SWE	Lovisa Yng

=== Former players ===
For details of current and former players, see Category:FC Rosengård players.

== Honours ==
Note: Achievements of Malmö FF Dam, LdB FC Malmö and FC Rosengård are all counted here

=== Domestic ===
==== League ====
- Damallsvenskan (Tier 1)
  - Winners (14): 1986, 1990, 1991, 1993, 1994, 2010, 2011, 2013, 2014, 2015, 2019, 2021, 2022, 2024
  - Runners-up (13): 1989, 1996, 1997, 1998, 1999, 2000, 2001, 2002, 2005, 2012, 2016, 2017, 2020
- Division 1 Södra (Tier 1)
  - Winners (1): 1986
- Division 2 Södra Götaland (Tier 2)
  - Winners (1): 1980

==== Cups ====
- Svenska Cupen:
  - Winners (5): 1990, 1997, 2015–16, 2016–17, 2017–18, 2021–22
  - Runners-up (2): 2003, 2014–15
- Svenska Supercupen:
  - Winners (4): 2011, 2012, 2015, 2016

== Record in UEFA competitions ==
All results (away, home and aggregate) list Rosengård Malmö's goal tally first.

Season	Competition	Round	Club	Away	Home	Aggregate
2003–2004	UEFA Women's Cup	Second qualifying round	(Finland) Jakobstad–Pietarsaari	3–0	—N/a	—N/a
2003–2004	UEFA Women's Cup	Second qualifying round	(Israel) Maccabi Holon	6–1	—N/a	—N/a
2003–2004	UEFA Women's Cup	Second qualifying round	(Ukraine) Legenda Chernihiv (Host)	3–0	—N/a	—N/a
2003–2004	UEFA Women's Cup	Quarter-final	(Norway) Kolbotn	0–1	2–0 ^{f}	2–1
2003–2004	UEFA Women's Cup	Semi-final	(Germany) Frankfurt	1–4	0–0 ^{f}	1–4
2011–2012	UEFA Women's Champions League	Round of 32	(Italy) Tavagnacco	1–2 ^{f}	5–0	6–2
2011–2012	UEFA Women's Champions League	Round of 16	(Austria) Neulengbach	3–1 ^{f}	1–0	4–1
2011–2012	UEFA Women's Champions League	Quarter-final	(Germany) Frankfurt	0–3	1–0 ^{f}	1–3
2012–2013	UEFA Women's Champions League	Round of 32	(Hungary) MTK Budapest	4–0 ^{f}	6–1	10–1
2012–2013	UEFA Women's Champions League	Round of 16	(Italy) Verona	2–0	1–0 ^{f}	3–0
2012–2013	UEFA Women's Champions League	Quarter-final	(France) Olympique Lyon	0–5 ^{f}	0–3	0–8
2013–2014	UEFA Women's Champions League	Round of 32	(Norway) Lillestrøm	3–1 ^{f}	5–0	8–1
2013–2014	UEFA Women's Champions League	Round of 16	(Germany) Wolfsburg	1–3	1–2 ^{f}	2–5
2014–2015	UEFA Women's Champions League	Round of 32	(Russia) Ryazan	3–1 ^{f}	2–0	5–1
2014–2015	UEFA Women's Champions League	Round of 16	(Denmark) Fortuna Hjørring	2–0	2–1 ^{f}	4–1
2014–2015	UEFA Women's Champions League	Quarter-final	(Germany) Wolfsburg	1–1 ^{f}	3–3	4–4 (agr)
2015–2016	UEFA Women's Champions League	Round of 32	(Finland) Vantaa	2–0 ^{f}	7–0	9–0
2015–2016	UEFA Women's Champions League	Round of 16	(Italy) Verona	3–1 ^{f}	5–1	8–2
2015–2016	UEFA Women's Champions League	Quarter-final	(Germany) Frankfurt	1–0 a.e.t. (4p–5p)	0–1 ^{f}	1–1
2016–2017	UEFA Women's Champions League	Round of 32	(Iceland) Breiðablik Kópavogur	1–0 ^{f}	0–0	1–0
2016–2017	UEFA Women's Champions League	Round of 16	(Czech Republic) Slavia Prague	3–1 ^{f}	3–0	6–1
2016–2017	UEFA Women's Champions League	Quarter-final	(Spain) FC Barcelona	0–2	0–1 ^{f}	0–3
2017–2018	UEFA Women's Champions League	Round of 32	(Romania) Olimpia Cluj-Napoca	1–0 ^{f}	4–0	5–0
2017–2018	UEFA Women's Champions League	Round of 16	(England) Chelsea	0–3 ^{f}	0–1	0–4
2018–2019	UEFA Women's Champions League	Round of 32	(Russia) Ryazan	1–0 ^{f}	2–0	3–0
2018–2019	UEFA Women's Champions League	Round of 16	(Czech Republic) Slavia Prague	0–0	2–3 ^{f}	2–3
2020–2021	UEFA Women's Champions League	Round of 32	(Georgia (country)) Lanchkhuti	7–0 ^{f}	10–0	17–0
2020–2021	UEFA Women's Champions League	Round of 16	(Austria) St. Pölten	2–2	2–0 ^{f}	4–2
2020–2021	UEFA Women's Champions League	Quarter-finals	(Germany) Bayern Munich	0–3 ^{f}	0–1	0–4
2021–2022	UEFA Women's Champions League	Round 2	(Germany) 1899 Hoffenheim	3–3	0–3 ^{f}	3–6
2022–23	UEFA Women's Champions League	Qualifying round 2	(Norway) Brann	1–1 ^{f}	3–1	4–2
2022–23	UEFA Women's Champions League	Group stage	(Spain) Barcelona	0–6	1–4 ^{f}	4th
2022–23	UEFA Women's Champions League	Group stage	(Portugal) Benfica	0–1 ^{f}	1–3	4th
2022–23	UEFA Women's Champions League	Group stage	(Germany) Bayern Munich	1–2 ^{f}	0–4	4th
2023–24	UEFA Women's Champions League	Qualifying round 2	(Serbia) Spartak Subotica	2–1 ^{f}	5–1	7–2
2023–24	UEFA Women's Champions League	Group stage	(Spain) Barcelona	0–7	0–6 ^{f}	
2023–24	UEFA Women's Champions League	Group stage	(Portugal) Benfica	0–1 ^{f}	2–2	
2023–24	UEFA Women's Champions League	Group stage	(Germany) Eintracht Frankfurt	0–5	1–2 ^{f}	
2025–26	UEFA Women's Champions League	Second qualifying round	(North Macedonia) Ljuboten	5–0	—N/a	—N/a
2025–26	UEFA Women's Champions League	Second qualifying round	(Belgium) OH Leuven	2–3	—N/a	—N/a
2025–26	UEFA Women's Europa Cup	Second qualifying round	(Portugal) Sporting CP	0–3 ^{f}	2–2	2–5

^{f} First leg.

== Social impact ==
FC Rosengård is renowned for their work off the pitch on various projects. The club uses the slogan "Believe in your dream".

In South Africa, FC Rosengård has run the Football for Life center for girls since 2008, educating them to be football players, coaches and referees.

In Malmö, FC Rosengård has helped over 7,000 people since 2003 in the program Boost by FC Rosengård. The club has employed teachers, work counsellors and personnel to guide young unemployed people to work, studies and/or better health. The club is running a project for the European Social Fund.

Every week, the club reads to 350 children between 5 and 10 years of age before practice. The club visits kindergartens in the area of Rosengård in Malmö, where most people do not speak Swedish at home. Through the club, the children improve their vocabulary, which strengthens their chances of academic success in school.

In the project Move, financed by the Municipality of Malmö and sponsor Novo Nordisk, the club fights type 2 diabetes in socioeconomically challenged areas in Malmö. Nutrition, football, awareness and knowledge are spread to parents and children, in cooperation with health agencies and nurses.
