= 2024–25 Svenska Cupen (women) =

Tournament details
- Country: Sweden
- Dates: 8 May 2024 – 21 May 2025
- Teams: 72

Final positions
- Champions: Hammarby (4th title)
- Runners-up: Norrköping

Tournament statistics
- Matches played: 40
- Goals scored: 168 (4.2 per match)
- Attendance: 3,872 (97 per match)
- Top goal scorer(s): (Sweden) Ellen Wangerheim (11 goals)
- All statistics correct as of 21 August 2024. Goals scored in penalty shoot-outs not included.

The 2024–25 season of the Svenska Cupen was the 43rd season of the Swedish national women's football cup competition.

Piteå IF were the defending champions, having won their first Svenska Cupen in the 2023–24 season.

Hammarby IF defeated IFK Norrköping 2–0 in the final to win their fourth title thanks to a brace by 20-year-old Ellen Wangerheim, the tournament's top scorer.

== Teams ==
| Damallsvenskan | Elitettan | Division 1 and lower | |
| The 14 teams in the 2024 season. | 13 out of the 14 teams in the 2024 season. (Note: Sundsvalls DFF does not appear in the match order for round 2 and is instead replaced by Division 1's Team TG FF. No official statement has been issued about the change by SvFF, Sundsvalls DFF or Team TG FF.) | 45 (44 + 1) regional division qualifiers. | |
| AIK; IF Brommapojkarna; Djurgårdens IF; BK Häcken; Hammarby; Kristianstads DFF; Linköping FC; IFK Norrköping; KIF Örebro DFF; Piteå IF; FC Rosengård; Trelleborgs FF; Växjö DFF; Vittsjö GIK | Alingsås IF; Bollstanäs SK; Eskilstuna United DFF; Jitex BK; IFK Kalmar; Lidköpings FK; Mallbackens IF; Malmö FF; Örebro SK; Sunnanå SK; Umeå IK; IK Uppsala Fotboll; Gamla Upsala SK | Alnö IF; Älvsjö AIK; Bankeryds SK; Bele Barkarby FF; Borens IK; IK Brage; Degerfors IF; IF Elfsborg; Enköpings SK FK; Enskede IK; Eskilsminne IF; IFK Göteborg; Hällbybrunns IF; Helsingborgs IF; Hertzöga BK; Hittarps IK; IF Team Hudik; Husqvarna FF; IFK Karlshamn; IFK Lidingö FK; Ljungskile SK; Lilla Torg FF; Mariebo IK | Onsala BK; Örgryte IS; IFK Östersund; Östervåla IF; P18 IK; Sandvikens IF; Segeltorps IF; Själevads IK; Skellefteå FC; Skoftebyns IF; Smedby AIS; Sollentuna FK; Spjutstorps IF; IK Sturehov; Team TG FF; Tjust IF FF; FC Trollhättan; Tyresö FF; Utsiktens BK; Varbergs BoIS; Västerås SK Fotboll; IFK Wreta Kloster |

== Draw rules ==
The draw for rounds 1–3 is biased by geographical location to alleviate the economic burden on the participating teams. In round 2, the teams competing in the 2024 Elitettan cannot be drawn against each other. Similarly, teams competing in the 2024 Damallsvenskan cannot be drawn against each other in round 3. If the opponents in any of the rounds 1–3 compete in different league tiers, the lower ranked team get the home advantage. Otherwise, in round 2–3, the team that won the previous round in an away game gets the home advantage. In round 1 or if both teams won at home or away, the host is decided by a draw.

The top eight Damallsvenskan teams to advance from round 3 are assigned to groups in a predetermined order, as indicated by the following table:

| | Group 1 | Group 2 | Group 3 | Group 4 |
|---|---|---|---|---|
| A | Rank 1 | Rank 2 | Rank 3 | Rank 4 |
| B | Rank 8 | Rank 7 | Rank 6 | Rank 5 |
| C | Draw | Draw | Draw | Draw |
| D | Draw | Draw | Draw | Draw |

The team D is always guaranteed to be the lowest ranked team. The match order and home advantages of the single round-robin tournament are predetermined according to the following schema, where A–D are as defined above.

| Match order | Group with 4 Damallsvenskan teams | Group with 3 Damallsvenskan teams | Group with 2 Damallsvenskan teams |
|---|---|---|---|
| 1 | A – C | A – C | C – A |
| 2 | B – D | D – B | D – B |
| 3 | D – A | D – A | B – C |
| 4 | B – C | B – C | D – A |
| 5 | C – D | C – D | C – D |
| 6 | A – B | A – B | A – B |

The semi-final matches and the home side in both semi-finals and the final are decided by a draw.

== Round 1 ==
Number of teams per tier still in competition
| Damallsvenskan (Note: Damallsvenskan teams joined in the third round.) | Elitettan (Note: Elitettan teams joined in the second round.) | Division 1 and lower (Note: Team TG joined in the second round.) | Total |
|---|---|---|---|
| 14 / 14 | 13 / 13 | 45 / 45 | 72 / 72 |

| 8 May 2024 | IFK Lidingö FK | 3–0 | Enköpings SK FK | Lidingövallen, Lidingö |
| 20:15 CET (UTC+1) | Bylund 55', 89'; Palmkvist 79' | Report | | Attendance: 36; Referee: Mimmi Damtew |

| 9 May 2024 | IK Sturehov | 2–1 | Degerfors IF | Sörbyvallen, Örebro |
| 13:00 CET (UTC+1) | Thomsen 6'; Nilsson 47' | Report | Lindbäck 34' | Attendance: 115; Referee: Bengin Turan |

| 14 May 2024 | Hällbybrunns IF | 1–2 | Älvsjö AIK | Skogsvallen, Eksilstuna |
| 19:30 CET (UTC+1) | Forsström 29' | Report | Bäckberg 45'; Cederholm 73' | Attendance: 76; Referee: Mohamed Aziz |

| 15 May 2024 | Borens IK | 0–3 | Husqvarna FF | Borens IP, Motala |
| 18:30 CET (UTC+1) | | Report | C. Johansson 4'; L. Johansson 71'; Wigren 86' | Referee: Rickard Karlsson |

| 15 May 2024 | Östervåla IF | 2–3 | IK Brage | Lundavallen, Östervålla |
| 19:00 CET (UTC+1) | V. Andersson 65'; L. Nilsson 75' | Report | Hjälte 12'; Sandin 49', 87' | Attendance: 250; Referee: Nike Sjögerås |

| 15 May 2024 | IFK Wreta Kloster | 3–3 (a.e.t.) (5–6 p) | Tjust IF FF | Kungsbrohov, Vreta Kloster |
| 19:00 CET (UTC+1) | J. Andersson 5'; Wisén 25', 75' | Report | Ilhammar 5'; Karlberg 35'; Stenström 62' | Attendance: 55; Referee: Olivia Wickström |
| | Penalties |
| | E. Seger (penalty scored); Jansson (penalty scored); Grankvist (penalty missed); Nilsson (penalty scored); S. Seger (penalty missed); Sjöberg (penalty scored); Szilveszter (penalty scored); Wisén (penalty missed) | | (penalty scored) Karlberg; (penalty scored) Stenström; (penalty missed) Oskarsson; (penalty scored) Bergström; (penalty missed) Torgner; (penalty scored) Gustafsson; (penalty scored) Carlberg; (penalty scored) Salomonsson |

| 15 May 2024 | Smedby AIS | 3–0 | Tyresö FF | PreZero Arena, Norrköping |
| 19:30 CET (UTC+1) | Ibrahim 15'; Sävhult 49', 73' | Report | | Attendance: 113; Referee: Rafil Alinnbjörk |

| 22 May 2024 | Varbergs BoIS | 2–2 (a.e.t.) (4–3 p) | IF Elfsborg | Påskbergsvallen, Varberg |
| 19:00 CET (UTC+1) | Martinez 6'; Heurlin 40' | Report | unnamed player 15' (o.g.); Nilsson 82' | Referee: Maja Nyberg |
| | Penalties |
| | Borgman (penalty scored); unnamed player (penalty missed); Josefsson (penalty scored); Graudums (penalty scored); Klasson (penalty scored) | | (penalty scored) Nyström; (penalty scored) Nilsson; (penalty missed) unnamed player; (penalty scored) Jiozon; (penalty missed) unnamed player |

| 28 May 2024 | Utsiktens BK | 5–2 | Onsala BK | Valhalla IP, Gothenburg |
| 19:00 CET (UTC+1) | Söderström 6'; Ekner 23', 90+3'; Marin 34'; Nilsson 90' | Report | Nedrén 39'; Cederberg 49' | Referee: Petra Gabriella Saliba |

| 28 May 2024 | Lilla Torg FF | 3–0 | Hittarps IK | Mariedals IP, Malmö |
| 19:15 CET (UTC+1) | Aall-Flood 12'; Nordahl 38'; Ilvemark 52' | Report | | Referee: Molly Froste |

| 29 May 2024 | Spjutstorps IF | 2–0 | IFK Karlshamn | Bäckavallen, Tomelilla |
| 19:00 CET (UTC+1) | Emi. Nilsson 6'; Mattsson 56' | Report | | Referee: Ismar Huremovic |

| 29 May 2024 | Skellefteå FC | 3–1 | Själevads IK | Skogsvallen, Luleå |
| 19:15 CET (UTC+1) | Bjursell 10', 89'; Eskelinen 30' | Report | Moström 15' | Attendance: 51; Referee: Kaisa Kokkarinen |

| 29 May 2024 | Alnö IF | 0–1 | IFK Östersund | Släda IP, Alnö |
| 19:30 CET (UTC+1) | | Report | Sterner 82' | Referee: Oscar Moss |

| 29 May 2024 | Enskede IK | 1–0 | Bele Barkarby FF | Enskede IP, Stockholm |
| 20:00 CET (UTC+1) | Apel 86' | Report | | Attendance: 78; Referee: Nike Sjögerås |

| 29 May 2024 | Västerås SK Fotboll | 0–3 | Sollentuna FK | Hitachi Energy Arena, Västerås |
| 20:00 CET (UTC+1) | | Report | Somkumpee 13'; Okhiria 28'; Kalaitzidou 85' | Attendance: 129; Referee: Faisal Anmar Shanshal |

| 30 May 2024 | Skoftebyns IF | 0–4 (a.e.t.) | Örgryte IS | Nysätra IP, Trollhättan |
| 19:45 CET (UTC+1) | | Report | Fahlgren 94'; Sjöström 98', 117'; Björestam 115' | Referee: Abdullah Al-Ameri |

| 4 June 2024 | Eskilsminne IF | 1–1 (a.e.t.) (4–3 p) | Helsingborgs IF | Harlyckans IP, Helsingborg |
| 19:00 CET (UTC+1) | Karlsson 39' | Report | Larsson 43' | Attendance: 129; Referee: Maja Nyberg |
| | Penalties |
| | Karlsson (penalty scored); Nyberg Spets (penalty scored); unnamed player (penalty missed); Alva Hed (penalty scored) | | (penalty scored) Nilsson; (penalty scored) Rahmberg; (penalty scored) Winroth; (penalty scored) Manglind; (penalty scored) Skarström |

| 5 June 2024 | Bankeryds SK | 2–1 | Mariebo IK | Furuvik, Bankeryd |
| 19:00 CET (UTC+1) | Karlsson 5'; Elomri 56' | Report | Frössberg 4' | Attendance: 80; Referee: Raned Werdina |

| 5 June 2024 | Ljungskile SK | 3–4 (a.e.t.) | IFK Göteborg | Skarsjövallen, Ljungskile |
| 19:00 CET (UTC+1) | Forsblom 17'; Magnusson Tell 20'; Hell Johansson 45+2' | Report | Svanström 33', 43'; Johansson 69'; Palm 109' | Attendance: 100; Referee: Heidi Pagels |

| 5 June 2024 | IF Team Hudik | 2–6 | Sandvikens IF | Glysis Sparbanken Arena, Hudiksvall |
| 20:00 CET (UTC+1) | Sjölund64; Stenborg 88' | Report | Kempe Kivi 10'; Folkesson 54'; Pierre 56'; Sågström 57'; Johnsson 79'; Söderström 85' | Attendance: 107; Referee: Axel Örnehag |

| 6 June 2024 | Hertzöga BK | 0–1 | FC Trollhättan | Ilanda IP, Karlstad |
| 14:00 CET (UTC+1) | | Report | Drougge 39' | Attendance: 121; Referee: Amanda Davidsson |

| 6 June 2024 | Segeltorps IF | 9–0 | P18 IK | Segeltorps IP, Kungens Kurva |
| 14:00 CET (UTC+1) | Eriksson 5', 23', 42'; Sjöberg 8'; Ejnarsson 9'; Egegård 12'; Alkfors 32'; Sand 52'; Elmqvist 67' | Report | | Attendance: 60; Referee: Nike Sjögerås |

== Round 2 ==
Number of teams per tier still in competition
| Damallsvenskan (Note: Damallsvenskan teams joined in the third round.) | Elitettan | Division 1 and lower | Total |
|---|---|---|---|
| 14 / 14 | 13 / 13 | 22 / 45 | 27 / 72 |

| 30 July 2024 | Smedby AIS | 0–2 | Eskilstuna United DFF | PreZero Arena, Norrköping |
| 19:30 CET (UTC+1) | | Report | Youhana 11'; Bülow 62' | Attendance: 189; Referee: Rafil Alinnbjörk |

| 31 July 2024 | Spjutstorps IF | 0–6 | Malmö FF | Bäckavallen, Tomelilla |
| 19:00 CET (UTC+1) | | Report | Plantin 12', 43'; Welin Azinovic 25'; Persson 54'; Wahlgren 61'; unnamed player 79' (o.g.) | Attendance: 400; Referee: Molly Froste |

| 31 July 2024 | Älvsjö AIK | 1–0 | Segeltorps IF | Älvsjö IP, Stockholm |
| 19:15 CET (UTC+1) | Fernström 75' | Report | | Attendance: 75; Referee: Nike Sjögerås |

| 6 August 2024 | IFK Göteborg | 1–4 | Jitex BK | Valhalla IP, Gothenburg |
| 19:00 CET (UTC+1) | Molund 63' | Report | Alcaide 50', 77'; Ivarsson Lidström 53'; Magnusson Tell 62' | Attendance: 405; Referee: Jonathan Samefors |

| 7 August 2024 | IK Brage | 1–4 | Mallbackens IF | Borlänge Energi Arena, Borlänge |
| 19:00 CET (UTC+1) | Berglund 89' | Report | Rexhi 16'; Hallstensson 52' (59), 87' | Attendance: 122; Referee: Ibrahim Mizher |

| 7 August 2024 | IFK Östersund | 0–1 | Sandvikens IF | Jämtkraft Arena, Östersund |
| 19:00 CET (UTC+1) | | Report | unnamed player 80' (o.g.) | Attendance: 140; Referee: Andreas Olsson |

| 14 August 2024 | Bankeryds SK | 0–8 | Husqvarna FF | Furuvik, Bankeryd |
| 18:30 CET (UTC+1) | | Report | Glemdal Bergkvist 8', 49'; Wigren 27', 75'; Norlund 35'; C. Johansson 61'; L. Johansson 65'; Estunger 83' | Attendance: 100; Referee: Emran Kadrija |

| 14 August 2024 | Örgryte IS | 1–2 | Alingsås IF | Valhalla IP, Gothenburg |
| 19:00 CET (UTC+1) | Karisik 85' | Report | Lorén 56'; Milton 59' | Attendance: 162; Referee: Adam Granquist |

| 14 August 2024 | Tjust IF FF | 1–6 | IFK Kalmar | Tjustvallen, Gamleby |
| 19:00 CET (UTC+1) | unnamed player 10' (o.g.) | Report | Treiberg 20', 35'; Boubezari 44'; Petersson 87', 90+3'; Hagström 90+4' | Attendance: 80; Referee: Zelda Jakobsson |

| 14 August 2024 | Sollentuna FK | 1–5 | Bollstanäs SK | Sollentunavallen, Sollentuna |
| 20:00 CET (UTC+1) | Edström 90+1' | Report | Dreifaldt 52', 67'; Thim 71'; Lillbäck 87'; Wulff 90' | Attendance: 136; Referee: Mimmi Damtew |

| 20 August 2024 | IFK Lidingö FK | 1–8 | Gamla Upsala SK | Lidingövallen, Lidingö |
| 19:00 CET (UTC+1) | Gantelius 48' | Report | Rydell 10', 36', 75', 84', 85'; Thimstrand 27'; Paulsson 67'; Munthe Nilsson 72' | Attendance: 35; Referee: Rasmus Ekberg |

| 20 August 2024 | FC Trollhättan | 1–3 | Lidköpings FK | Edsborgs IP, Trollhättan |
| 19:30 CET (UTC+1) | unknown player | Report | Lindfors 25'; Bengtsson 41'; Ahlbom 62' | Referee: Ossian Henrysson |

| 21 August 2024 | Lilla Torg FF | 0–1 | Helsingborgs IF | Mariedals IP, Malmö |
| 18:30 CET (UTC+1) | | Report | Johansson 5' | Referee: Emilia Miter |

| 21 August 2024 | IK Sturehov | 1–3 | Örebro SK | Sörbyvallen, Örebro |
| 18:30 CET (UTC+1) | Lerjeryd 78' | Report | Karlsson Törnborg 57'; Dahlberg 83'; Olofsson 88' | Attendance: 72; Referee: Linnéa Wallin |

| 21 August 2024 | Enskede IK | 2–5 (a.e.t.) | IK Uppsala Fotboll | Enskede IP, Stockholm |
| 19:00 CET (UTC+1) | Stigmar 32'; Pingani 45' | Report | S. Leffler 5', 10'; Lindström 97'; Frisk 100'; Leffler 108' | Attendance: 78; Referee: Meysam Moosavi Ghahfarokhi |

| 21 August 2024 | Team TG FF | 1–1 (a.e.t.) (2–3 p) | Umeå IK | Umeå Energi Arena SOL, Umeå |
| 19:00 CET (UTC+1) | Mellouk 54' | Report | Bäckström 33' | Attendance: 178; Referee: Edvin Sundkvist |
| | Penalties |
| | Lindström (penalty missed); Norberg (penalty scored); Vikström (penalty scored); Lundgren (penalty missed); Wallner (penalty missed) | | (penalty missed) Nygren; (penalty missed) Sörlén; (penalty scored) Ek; (penalty scored) Langdok; (penalty scored) Davis |

| 21 August 2024 | Varbergs BoIS | 4–0 | Utsiktens BK | Påskbergsvallen, Varberg |
| 19:00 CET (UTC+1) | Martinez 9'; Graudums 37'; Heurlin 44', 72' | Report | | Referee: Jesper Hultén |

| 21 August 2024 | Skellefteå FC | 4–3 | Sunnanå SK | Skogsvallen, Luleå |
| 19:15 CET (UTC+1) | Bjursell 19', 29'; Munter 54'; Forslund 85' | Report | Forslund 63'; unnamed player 88'; Lundqvist 90+1' | Attendance: 200; Referee: Peter Lundström |

== Round 3 ==
Number of teams per tier still in competition
| Damallsvenskan | Elitettan | Division 1 and lower | Total |
|---|---|---|---|
| 14 / 14 | 12 / 13 | 6 / 45 | 32 / 72 |

The draw for round three has been conducted on 22 August 2024, with the Damallsvenskan teams entering the competition.

| 11 September 2024 | Mallbackens IF | 1–4 | KIF Örebro | Strandvallen, Lysvik |
| 2026-05-05 12:23 UTC | Hanna Stenberg 64' | Report | 6' Nora Harnes Håheim; 30', 34' Viivi Ollonqvist; 69' Áslaug Dóra Sigurbjörnsdottír | Attendance: 129; Referee: Honraw Ghassali |

| 11 September 2024 | Varbergs BoIS | 0–5 | Vittsjö GIK | Påskbergsvallen, Varberg |
| 2026-05-05 12:23 UTC | | Report | 42', 64', 84' Milla Larsson; 56' Cajsa Rubensson; 75' Heidi Kollanen | Referee: Maja Nyberg |

| 18 September 2024 | Skellefteå FC | 0–10 | Piteå IF | Skogsvallen, Skellefteå |
| 2026-05-05 12:23 UTC | | Report | 14' (pen.), 18' (pen.), 50' Maja Green; 32' Anam Imo; 69' Matilda Ekblom; 70' Emma Åström; 79' Ásla Johannesen; 85' Emma Viklund; 86' Olivia Holm; 90' Ellen Löfqvist | Attendance: 288; Referee: Edvin Sundkvist |

| 25 September 2024 | Husqvarna FF | 0–1 | Växjö DFF | Vapenvallen, Huskvarna |
| 2026-05-05 12:23 UTC | | Report | 52' Elin Nilsson | Referee: Maja Nyberg |

| 25 September 2024 | IFK Kalmar | 0–2 | Kristianstads DFF | Gröndals IP, Kalmar |
| 2026-05-05 12:23 UTC | | Report | 17' Tilda Persson; 62' Hlin Eiriksdottir | Referee: Molly Froste |

| 2 October 2024 | Eskilstuna United | 1–2 | IFK Norrköping | Tunavallen, Eskilstuna |
| 2026-05-05 12:23 UTC | Moa Selling 90+1' | Report | 6' Wilma Leidhammar; 43' Svea Rehnberg | Attendance: 189; Referee: Adli Assali |

| 15 October 2024 | Jitex BK | 0–9 | BK Häcken | Åbyvallen, Mölndal |
| 2026-05-05 12:23 UTC | | Report | 2', 5', 10' Alice Bergström; 8' Josefine Rybrink; 17' Hikaru Kitagawa; 25' Clarissa Larisey; 37' Felicia Schröder; 42' Ruby Grant; 50' Matilda Nildén | Referee: Amane Kandas |

| 16 October 2024 | IK Uppsala | 2–2 (a.e.t.) (3–4 p) | Djurgårdens IF | Studenternas IP, Uppsala |
| 2026-05-05 12:23 UTC | Thindra Mattsson 50'; Elin Flakberg 59' | Report | 5' Mimmi Larsson; 82' Zara Jönsson | Attendance: 108; Referee: Adli Assali |
| | Penalties |
| | Lisa Frisk (penalty scored); Clara Leffler (penalty missed); Olivia Mattsson (penalty missed); Arsema Weldai (penalty scored); Amanda Sundström (penalty scored) | | (penalty scored) Therese Åsland; (penalty scored) Shinomi Koyama; (penalty scored) Mimmi Larsson; (penalty missed) Ebba Hed; (penalty scored) Olivia Ländin Sjöblom |

| 16 October 2024 | Helsingborgs IF | 0–4 | FC Rosengård | Olympia, Helsingborg |
| 2026-05-05 12:23 UTC | | Report | 2' Mai Kadowaki; 19' Rebecca Knaak; 57' Rebecca Maravall Almqvist; 65' Gudrun Arnardottir | Attendance: 958; Referee: Molly Froste |

| 23 October 2024 | Sandvikens IF | 0–7 | Umeå IK | Jernvallen, Sandviken |
| 2026-05-05 12:23 UTC | | Report | 14' Alva Eriksson; 21' Alexandra Sandström; 25' Frida Lähteenmäki; 33' Makenzie Langdok; 43', 89' Stina Andersson; 87' Tyra Eriksén | Attendance: 106; Referee: Rasmus Ekberg |

| 24 October 2024 | Bollstanäs SK | 1–3 (a.e.t.) | AIK | Bollstanäs IP, Upplands Väsby |
| 2026-05-05 12:23 UTC | Louise Lillbäck 59' | Report | 90+1' Haruna Tabata; 94' Nellie Eriksen Yasseri; 105+3' Nina Jakobsson | Attendance: 285; Referee: Oscar Forsberg |

| 24 October 2024 | Alingsås IF | 1–0 | Lidköpings FK | Alströmervallen, Alingsås |
| 2026-05-05 12:23 UTC | Moa Jarl 55' | Report | | Referee: Victor Karimi |

| 5 November 2024 | Älvsjö AIK | 0–9 | IF Brommapojkarna | Älvsjö IP, Stockholm |
| 2026-05-05 12:23 UTC | | Report | 17', 33' Tuva Ölvestad; 18' Johanna Svedberg; 20' (o.g.); 26', 55' Emma Engström; 45' Cassandra Larsson; 69' Ellinor Johansson; 77' Fanny Hjelm Rönnlund | Attendance: 150; Referee: Jesper Fredholm |

| 6 November 2024 | Gamla Upsala SK | 0–9 | Hammarby IF | Lötens IP, Uppsala |
| 2026-05-05 12:23 UTC | | Report | 11', 40', 56' Smilla Valloto; 15', 61' Emma Westin; 21' Anna Jøsendal; 50', 84' Suzu Amano; 88' Ellen Wangerheim | Attendance: 497; Referee: Amanda Nylund Karman |

| 6 November 2024 | Örebro SK | 2–4 | Linköpings FC | Behrn Arena, Örebro |
| 2026-05-05 12:23 UTC | Sofia Vesterlund 13'; Emelie Alfredsson 89' | Report | 55' Eshly Bakker; 71', 97' Delaney Baie Pridham; 108' Aimee Claypole | Referee: Linnéa Wallin |

| 6 November 2024 | Malmö FF | 1–0 | Trelleborgs FF | Stadion, Malmö |
| 2026-05-05 12:23 UTC | Mia Persson 35' | Report | | Attendance: 1,069; Referee: Niklas Olsson |

== Group stage ==
Number of teams per tier still in competition
| Damallsvenskan | Elitettan | Division 1 and lower | Total |
|---|---|---|---|
| 12 / 14 | 4 / 13 | 0 / 45 | 16 / 72 |

=== Group 1 ===
| Pos | Team | Pld | W | D | L | GF | GA | GD | Pts | Qualification | FCR | MFF | LFC | VDFF |
|---|---|---|---|---|---|---|---|---|---|---|---|---|---|---|
| 1 | FC Rosengård | 3 | 2 | 1 | 0 | 5 | 2 | +3 | 7 | Advance to the semi-finals | | | 2–0 | 2–1 |
| 2 | Malmö FF | 3 | 1 | 1 | 1 | 5 | 5 | 0 | 4 | | 1–1 | | | 4–3 |
| 3 | Linköping FC | 3 | 1 | 1 | 1 | 3 | 4 | −1 | 4 | | | 1–0 | | |
| 4 | Växjö DFF | 3 | 0 | 1 | 2 | 6 | 8 | −2 | 1 | | | | 2–2 | |

Source: SvFF
Rules for classification: Tiebreakers

=== Group 2 ===
| Pos | Team | Pld | W | D | L | GF | GA | GD | Pts | Qualification | BKH | DIF | UIK | VGIK |
|---|---|---|---|---|---|---|---|---|---|---|---|---|---|---|
| 1 | BK Häcken | 3 | 3 | 0 | 0 | 16 | 3 | +13 | 9 | Advance to the semi-finals | | 4–2 | | 7–1 |
| 2 | Djurgårdens IF | 3 | 1 | 1 | 1 | 5 | 5 | 0 | 4 | | | | | 2–0 |
| 3 | Umeå IK | 3 | 0 | 2 | 1 | 2 | 7 | −5 | 2 | | 0–5 | 1–1 | | |
| 4 | Vittsjö GIK | 3 | 0 | 1 | 2 | 2 | 10 | −8 | 1 | | | | 1–1 | |

Source: SvFF
Rules for classification: Tiebreakers

=== Group 3 ===
| Pos | Team | Pld | W | D | L | GF | GA | GD | Pts | Qualification | HIF | BP | PIF | AIF |
|---|---|---|---|---|---|---|---|---|---|---|---|---|---|---|
| 1 | Hammarby IF | 3 | 3 | 0 | 0 | 10 | 2 | +8 | 9 | Advance to the semi-finals | | 3–1 | 3–1 | |
| 2 | IF Brommapojkarna | 3 | 1 | 1 | 1 | 5 | 4 | +1 | 4 | | | | | 3–0 |
| 3 | Piteå IF | 3 | 1 | 1 | 1 | 3 | 4 | −1 | 4 | | | 1–1 | | |
| 4 | Alingsås IF | 3 | 0 | 0 | 3 | 0 | 8 | −8 | 0 | | 0–4 | | 0–1 | |

Source: SvFF
Rules for classification: Tiebreakers

=== Group 4 ===
| Pos | Team | Pld | W | D | L | GF | GA | GD | Pts | Qualification | IFK | KDFF | AIK | KIF |
|---|---|---|---|---|---|---|---|---|---|---|---|---|---|---|
| 1 | IFK Norrköping | 3 | 2 | 1 | 0 | 4 | 1 | +3 | 7 | Advance to the semi-finals | | | 2–0 | 1–1 |
| 2 | Kristianstads DFF | 3 | 2 | 0 | 1 | 3 | 2 | +1 | 6 | | 0–1 | | 2–1 | |
| 3 | AIK | 3 | 1 | 0 | 2 | 3 | 5 | −2 | 3 | | | | | 2–1 |
| 4 | KIF Örebro | 3 | 0 | 1 | 2 | 2 | 4 | −2 | 1 | | | 0–1 | | |

Source: SvFF
Rules for classification: Tiebreakers

== Final rounds ==
=== Bracket ===
Semi-finals
1 May 2025
Norrköping | 2
Häcken | 1
1 May 2025
Hammarby | 5
Rosengård | 0

Final
6 June 2025
Norrköping | 0
Hammarby | 2

=== Semi-finals ===
1 May 2025
13:00 CEST (UTC+2)

| IFK Norrköping | 2–1 | BK Häcken |
|---|---|---|
| Rehnberg 29'; Leidhammar 78' | Report | Schröder 89' |

Nya Parken, Norrköping
Referee: Hanna Laajanen
1 May 2025
16:00 CEST (UTC+2)

| Hammarby IF | 5–0 | FC Rosengård |
|---|---|---|
| Blakstad 12', 58'; Wangerheim 26'; Tandberg 85', 90+2' (pen.) | Report |

Hammarby IP, Stockholm
Attendance: 3,238
Referee: Eva Svärdsudd

=== Final ===
21 May 2025
19:00 CEST (UTC+2)

| Hammarby | 2–0 | Norrköping |
|---|---|---|
| Wangerheim 12', 69' | Report |

3Arena, Stockholm
Attendance: 13,080
Referee: Tess Olofsson

== Top goalscorers ==
| Rank | Player | Team | Goals |
|---|---|---|---|
| 1 | (Sweden) Ellen Wangerheim | Hammarby | 11 |
| 2 | (Sweden) Felicia Schröder | Häcken | 7 |
| 3 | (Sweden) Izabell Rydell | Gamla Upsala | 5 |
| 4 | (Sweden) Leia Bjursell | Skellefteå | 4 |
| 5 | (Sweden) Linda Eriksson | Segeltorps | 3 |
| 5 | (Sweden) Ida Hallstensson | Mallbacken | 3 |
| 5 | (Sweden) Ellen Heurlin | Varberg | 3 |
| 5 | (Norway) Sara Kanutte Fornes | Malmö | 3 |
| 5 | (Sweden) Matilda Nildén | Häcken | 3 |
| 5 | (Sweden) Wilma Wigren | Husqvarna | 3 |
