= 2025 Damallsvenskan =

Swedish women's football top division, 2025 season

Damallsvenskan
- Season: 2025
- Dates: 23 March – 16 November 2025
- Champions: Häcken; 2nd title
- Relegated: Linköping; Alingsås
- Champions League: Häcken; Hammarby; Malmö
- Matches: 182
- Goals: 606 (3.33 per match)
- Top goalscorer: Felicia Schröder (30 goals)
- Best goalkeeper: Jennifer Falk (10 clean sheets)
- Biggest home win: Hammarby 7–0 Alingsås (8 August 2025)
- Biggest away win: Växjö 0–7 Hammarby (28 September 2025)
- Highest scoring: AIK 6–3 Alingsås; 11 October 2025
- Longest winning run: 9 games Häcken
- Longest unbeaten run: 13 games Norrköping
- Longest winless run: 12 games Rosengård
- Longest losing run: 7 games Alingsås; Linköping; Rosengård
- Highest attendance: 6,372; Hammarby 2–1 Malmö (6 September 2025)
- Lowest attendance: 140; Brommapojkarna 3–1 Piteå (3 May 2025); Brommapojkarna 0–6 Häcken (19 October 2025)
- Total attendance: 168,615
- Average attendance: 926

The 2025 Damallsvenskan, known as the 2025 OBOS Damallsvenskan for sponsorship reasons, was the 38th season of the Damallsvenskan, the top division of women's football in Sweden. The season began on 23 March and ended on 16 November.

FC Rosengård were the reigning champions, having won a record 14th title in the previous season. However, the club did not defend their title, and instead had their worst season in history until the 2026 season.

Alingsås IF were relegated back down to the Elitettan on 19 October following a 3–3 draw at home with Växjö DFF. Linköping FC, once one of Sweden's top clubs, were relegated to the Elitettan on 8 November for the first time in history, following Rosengård's 1–0 away win over Piteå IF and IF Brommapojkarna's 3–0 home win over AIK Stockholm. Brommapojkarna finished 12th and defeated KIF Örebro in the promotion/relegation playoffs, therefore staying in the top flight.

BK Häcken won the title on 8 November following a 2–0 away win over Djurgårdens IF, clinching their second Damallsvenskan title and their first since 2020 (when the club was known as Kopparbergs/Göteborg FC). Häcken alongside runners-up Hammarby IF and newly-promoted third place Malmö FF secured spots in the qualifying rounds of the UEFA Women's Champions League (UWCL).

== Teams ==
Location of teams in the 2025 Damallsvenskan
Location of teams in the 2025 Damallsvenskan in Stockholm Municipality

Team	Location	Stadium	Stadium capacity (Note: According to each club information page previously available at the Swedish Football Association website for Damallsvenskan, unless otherwise noted. Since May 2018 this is no longer present. Numbers were usually lower than official stadium numbers.)
AIK	Stockholm (Solna)	Skytteholms IP	5,200
Alingsås IF	Alingsås	Mjörnvallen	1,500
BK Häcken	Gothenburg (Brämaregården)	Bravida Arena	6,500
Djurgårdens IF	Stockholm (Villastaden)	Stockholm Olympic Stadium	14,417
FC Rosengård	Malmö (Kronborg)	Malmö IP	5,700
Hammarby IF	Stockholm (Skanstull)	Hammarby IP	3,700
Hammarby IF	Stockholm (Johanneshov)	3Arena	30,000
IF Brommapojkarna	Stockholm (Vällingby)	Grimsta IP	5,000
IF Brommapojkarna	Stockholm (Kristineberg)	Kristinebergs IP	1,500
IFK Norrköping	Norrköping	PlatinumCars Arena	17,234
Kristianstads DFF	Kristianstad	Kristianstads Fotbollsarena	3,080 (Note: According to the history page on Kristianstad's website.)
Linköping FC	Linköping	Arena Linköping	8,500
Malmö FF	Malmö (Stadionområdet)	Eleda Stadion	26,500
Malmö FF	Malmö (Stadionområdet)	Malmö Stadion	22,500
Piteå IF	Piteå	LF Arena	6,500
Piteå IF	Luleå	JIABvallen	1,503
Växjö DFF	Växjö	Visma Arena	12,000
Vittsjö GIK	Vittsjö	Vittsjö IP	3,000

=== Personnel and kits ===
Team	Manager	Captain	Kit manufacturer
AIK	(Sweden) Lukas Syberyjski	(Sweden) Jennie Nordin	(United States) Nike
Alingsås	(Sweden) Robert Ranieli		
Brommapojkarna	(Sweden) Daniel Gunnars	(Sweden) Elsa Karlsson	(United States) Nike
Djurgården	(Sweden) Marcelo Fernández		(Germany) Puma
Häcken	(Lebanon) Mak Lind	(Sweden) Jennifer Falk	(Germany) Puma
Hammarby	(Sweden) Martin Sjögren	(Sweden) Alice Carlsson	(Sweden) Craft
Kristianstad	(Sweden) Johanna Almgren (Sweden) Daniel Angergård	(Sweden) Alice Nilsson	
Linköping	(Scotland) Willie Kirk	(Sweden) Emma Lennartsson	
Malmö	(Sweden) Jonas Valfridsson	(Sweden) Elin Björklund	(Germany) Puma
Norrköping	(Sweden) Stellan Carlsson		(Germany) Adidas
Piteå	(Sweden) Fredrik Bernhardsson	(Sweden) Cecilia Edlund	
Rosengård	(Sweden) Qvarmans Möller		
Växjo	(Sweden) Olof Unogård	(Sweden) Josefin Harrysson	
Vittsjö	(Serbia) Mladen Blagojević	(Sweden) Sandra Lynn	

=== Managerial changes ===
Team	Outgoing manager	Manner of departure	Date of vacancy	Position in table	Incoming manager	Date of appointment
Linköping	(Finland) Jonne Kunnas	Sacked	30 June 2025	13th	(Scotland) Willie Kirk	1 July 2025
Rosengård	(Sweden) Joel Kjetselberg	Sacked	9 September 2025	11th	(Sweden) Qvarmans Möller	9 September 2025

== League table ==
Pos	Team	Pld	W	D	L	GF	GA	GD	Pts	Qualification or relegation
1	BK Häcken (C)	26	21	1	4	86	17	+69	64	Qualification for the Champions League league phase (Note: BK Häcken originally qualified for the 2026–27 UEFA Women's Champions League second qualifying round, but will enter the third qualifying round as 2025–26 UEFA Women's Europa Cup champions. They will furthermore promote to the league phase as the winners of the since the 2025–26 UEFA Women's Champions League winner (Barcelona) already qualified via their domestic league.)
2	Hammarby IF	26	19	3	4	72	19	+53	60	Qualification for the Champions League second qualifying round
3	Malmö FF	26	18	3	5	58	27	+31	57	Qualification for the Champions League second qualifying round
4	Djurgårdens IF	26	15	5	6	49	38	+11	50	
5	IFK Norrköping	26	13	7	6	37	33	+4	46	
6	Kristianstads DFF	26	12	5	9	46	36	+10	41	
7	Vittsjö GIK	26	10	5	11	36	48	−12	35	
8	AIK	26	11	1	14	35	42	−7	34	
9	Piteå IF	26	9	4	13	31	43	−12	31	
10	Växjö DFF	26	9	3	14	38	56	−18	30	
11	FC Rosengård	26	7	4	15	30	42	−12	25	
12	IF Brommapojkarna (O)	26	7	2	17	42	65	−23	23	Qualification for the relegation play-offs
13	Linköping FC (R)	26	4	4	18	27	62	−35	16	Relegation to the Elitettan
14	Alingsås IF (R)	26	2	3	21	19	78	−59	9	Relegation to the Elitettan

Source: Swedish Football Association (in Swedish)
Rules for classification: 1) Points; 2) Goal difference; 3) Number of goals scored; 4) Head-to-head points; 5) Head-to-head goal difference; 6) Head-to-head away goals scored
(C) Champions; (O) Play-off winners; (R) Relegated

=== Positions by round ===
Team ╲ Round	1	2	3	4	5	6	7	8	9	10	11	12	13	14	15	16	17	18	19	20	21	22	23	24	25	26
BK Häcken	9	11	9	7	5	5	5	4	3	2	2	1	1	1	3	2	3	3	3	2	1	1	1	1	1	1
Hammarby IF	2	1	1	1	1	1	1	1	2	1	1	2	2	2	1	3	1	1	1	1	2	2	2	2	2	2
Malmö FF	4	10	5	3	3	3	3	3	4	4	3	3	3	3	2	1	2	2	2	3	3	3	3	3	3	3
Djurgårdens IF	5	2	2	2	2	2	2	2	1	3	4	4	4	5	4	4	4	4	4	4	4	4	4	4	4	4
IFK Norrköping	8	4	3	5	7	7	8	10	11	12	12	11	9	9	7	7	6	6	6	6	6	5	5	5	5	5
Kristianstads DFF	10	7	10	10	11	9	6	5	5	5	5	5	5	4	5	5	5	5	5	5	5	6	6	6	6	6
Vittsjö GIK	7	5	8	9	10	11	12	9	9	10	8	8	7	7	8	8	8	8	8	7	7	7	8	7	7	7
AIK	3	9	12	12	9	10	7	8	7	6	7	6	6	6	6	6	7	7	7	8	8	8	7	8	8	8
Piteå IF	11	8	7	6	6	8	10	11	10	7	9	9	11	11	11	11	10	10	10	10	10	9	9	9	9	9
Växjö DFF	13	12	11	11	12	13	11	12	12	11	11	12	10	10	10	10	9	9	9	9	9	10	10	10	10	10
FC Rosengård	6	8	6	4	4	4	4	6	6	8	6	7	8	8	9	9	11	11	11	12	12	12	12	12	12	11
IF Brommapojkarna	1	6	4	8	8	6	9	7	8	9	10	10	12	12	12	12	12	12	12	11	11	11	11	11	11	12
Linköping FC	12	14	13	13	13	12	13	13	13	13	13	13	13	14	13	13	13	13	13	13	13	13	13	13	13	13
Alingsås IF	14	13	14	14	14	14	14	14	14	14	14	14	14	13	14	14	14	14	14	14	14	14	14	14	14	14

Leader and 2026–27 UEFA Champions League first round
2026–27 UEFA Champions League first round
Relegation play-off
Relegation to the Elitettan

Source: Swedish Football Association (in Swedish)

== Results ==
Home \ Away	AIK	ALI	BRO	DJU	HÄK	HAM	KRI	LIN	MAL	NOR	PIT	ROS	VÄX	VIT
AIK	—	6–3	2–0	0–1	2–5	1–0	2–0	2–0	1–4	1–2	0–1	1–0	1–2	1–2
Alingsås	1–4	—	3–2	1–4	0–2	0–3	0–3	0–1	0–4	0–0	1–3	1–0	3–3	0–1
Brommapojkarna	3–0	5–1	—	1–2	0–6	1–4	1–2	3–1	2–5	1–2	3–1	2–1	2–3	2–3
Djurgården	4–0	5–1	1–0	—	0–2	2–1	2–1	3–2	1–4	1–1	3–3	2–2	2–1	1–1
Häcken	6–0	6–1	6–1	4–1	—	2–0	1–1	4–0	2–3	1–3	1–0	3–0	3–1	5–1
Hammarby	1–0	7–0	6–0	2–1	1–0	—	1–0	3–0	2–1	4–0	2–1	4–0	4–1	3–2
Kristianstad	0–3	7–1	2–2	2–4	2–0	2–0	—	3–1	1–1	0–1	1–1	2–1	2–1	3–2
Linköping	1–4	2–1	4–1	1–2	0–5	0–5	2–2	—	1–1	1–1	2–2	0–3	0–4	3–0
Malmö	2–0	1–0	1–0	4–0	0–3	1–1	1–0	2–1	—	0–2	1–2	2–1	3–1	3–1
Norrköping	1–0	3–0	3–3	2–0	0–4	2–2	1–4	2–0	0–4	—	1–2	1–0	2–0	1–1
Piteå	2–0	2–1	1–2	0–0	0–0	0–5	2–0	2–1	0–3	1–2	—	0–1	0–1	2–3
Rosengård	1–2	0–0	2–5	1–2	0–1	2–2	2–1	3–1	0–1	2–1	1–0	—	2–3	2–2
Växjö	0–2	3–0	2–0	0–3	0–5	0–7	2–3	2–1	2–4	1–1	1–2	0–1	—	2–2
Vittsjö	0–0	1–0	1–0	1–2	0–4	0–2	1–3	2–1	3–2	0–2	2–1	3–2	1–2	—

Source: Swedish Football Association (in Swedish)
Legend: Blue = home team win; Yellow = draw; Red = away team win.
For upcoming matches, an "a" indicates there is an article about the rivalry between the two participants.

=== Results by round ===
Team ╲ Round	1	2	3	4	5	6	7	8	9	10	11	12	13	14	15	16	17	18	19	20	21	22	23	24	25	26
AIK	W	L	L	L	W	D	W	L	W	W	L	W	W	L	L	W	L	W	L	L	L	W	W	L	L	L
Alingsås	L	L	L	L	L	W	L	L	D	L	L	L	L	W	L	L	L	L	L	L	L	L	D	D	L	L
Brommapojkarna	W	L	W	L	L	W	L	W	L	W	D	L	L	L	L	L	D	W	L	W	L	L	L	L	W	L
Djurgården	W	W	D	W	D	D	W	W	W	L	L	W	L	D	W	W	W	L	W	W	D	W	L	W	L	W
Häcken	L	L	W	W	W	L	W	W	W	W	W	W	W	W	L	W	D	W	W	W	W	W	W	W	W	W
Hammarby	W	W	W	W	D	W	L	W	L	W	W	D	W	W	W	D	W	W	L	W	W	L	W	W	W	W
Kristianstad	L	W	L	L	D	W	W	W	W	W	D	W	L	W	L	L	D	W	W	D	W	L	L	L	D	W
Linköping	L	L	L	D	W	D	L	L	L	L	L	L	L	L	W	W	L	L	D	L	W	L	L	L	D	L
Malmö	W	L	W	W	D	D	W	W	L	W	W	W	W	W	W	W	L	L	W	D	W	W	W	L	W	W
Norrköping	D	W	W	D	L	D	L	L	D	L	D	D	W	W	W	W	D	W	W	W	W	W	W	L	L	W
Piteå	L	W	D	W	D	L	L	L	W	W	L	L	L	L	W	L	W	L	D	L	D	W	W	W	L	L
Rosengård	W	W	L	W	D	L	W	L	L	L	W	D	L	L	L	D	L	L	L	L	L	L	L	D	W	W
Växjö	L	L	W	W	D	L	W	L	L	L	D	L	W	L	W	L	W	L	W	L	L	L	D	W	W	L
Vittsjö	D	W	L	L	D	D	L	W	W	L	W	D	W	D	L	L	W	W	L	W	L	W	L	W	L	L

Source: Swedish Football Association (in Swedish)
W = Win; D = Draw; L = Loss

== Relegation playoffs ==
Team 1	Agg.	Team 2	1st leg	2nd leg
IF Brommapojkarna	4–0	KIF Örebro	2–0	2–0

=== First leg ===
20 November 2025
19:00 CEST

KIF Örebro	0–2	IF Brommapojkarna
	Report	Priks 38'; Lillbäck 46'

Eyravallen, Örebro
Attendance: 638
Referee: Lovisa Johansson

=== Second leg ===
23 November 2025
14:00 CEST

IF Brommapojkarna	2–0	KIF Örebro
Thörnqvist 55'; Engström 90+1'	Report

Grimsta IP
Attendance: 195
Referee: Tess Olofsson

Brommapojkarna won 4–0 on aggregate

== Season statistics ==
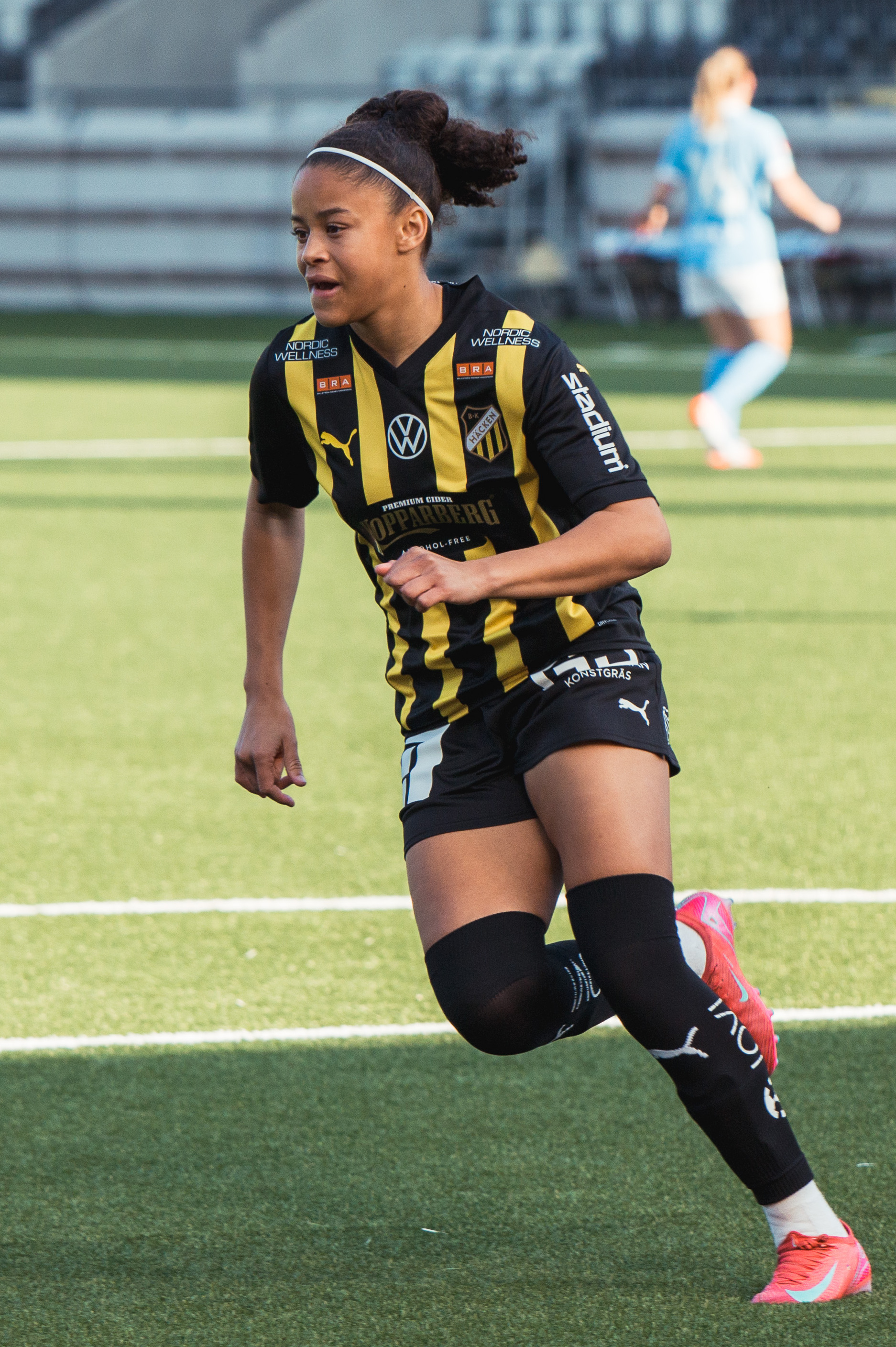
Häcken's Felicia Schröder finished the season with the most goals, with 30.

=== Top scorers ===
Players in italics left during the season

Rank	Player	Club	Goals
1	(Sweden) Felicia Schröder	Häcken	30
2	(Norway) Sara Kanutte	Malmö	17
2	(Sweden) Ellen Wangerheim	Hammarby	17
4	(Norway) Julie Blakstad	Hammarby	15
5	(United States) Larkin Russell	Växjö	12
6	(Bosnia and Herzegovina) Adelisa Grabus	AIK	11
6	(Sweden) Mimmi Wahlström	Djurgården	11
8	(Sweden) Anna Anvegård	Häcken	10
8	(Sweden) Monica Jusu Bah	Häcken	10
10	(Norway) Therese Åsland	Djurgården	9
10	(United States) Izzy D'Aquila	Malmö	9
10	(Sweden) Beata Olsson	Kristianstad	9

==== Hat tricks ====
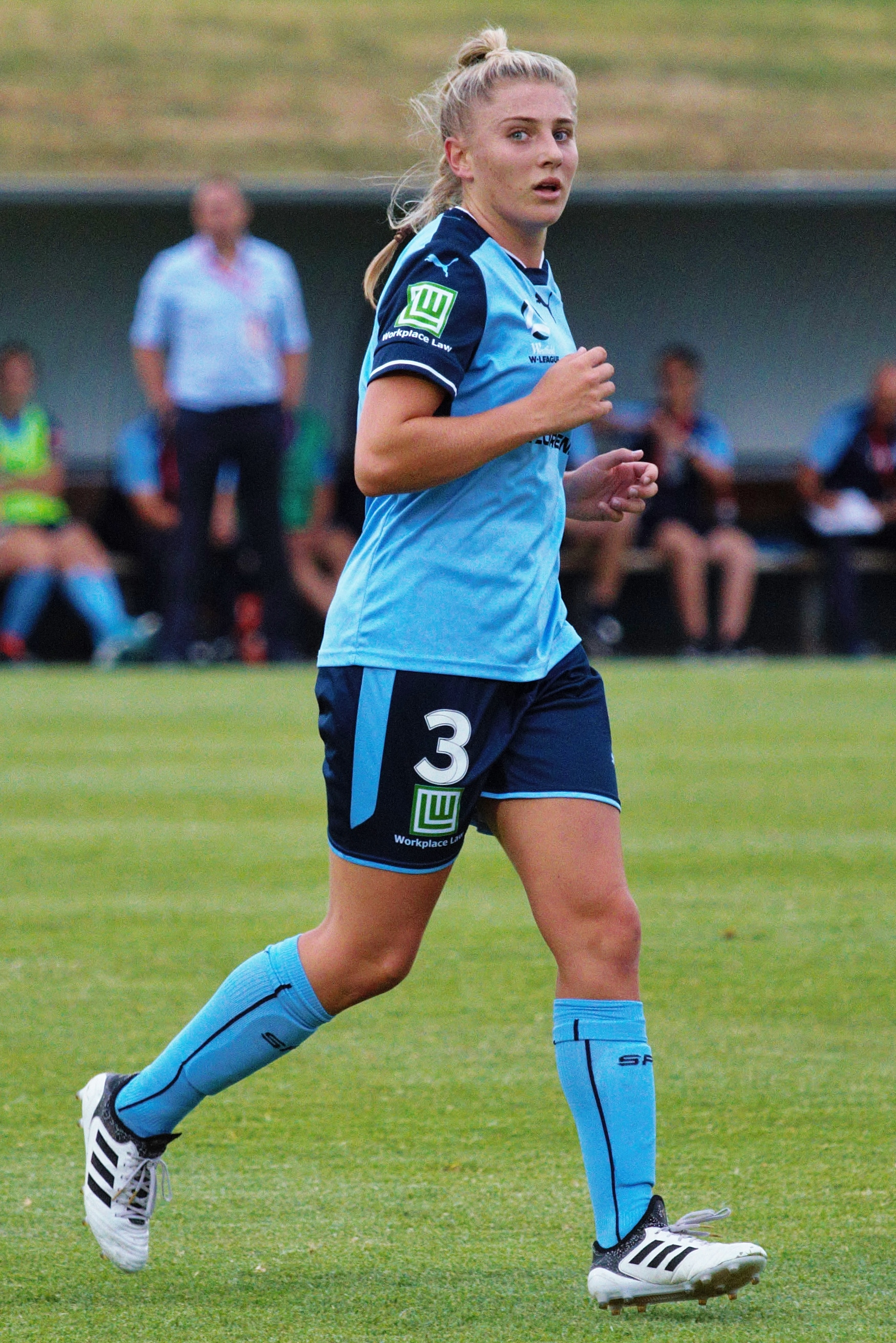
Kristianstad's Remy Siemsen was the only non-Scandinavian to score a hat-trick in the entire season, having netted one on the final day against Alingsås, who finished last. Last season, she also netted a hat-trick on the final day against the last-placed team (Trelleborg).

Player	For	Against	Result	Date
(Sweden) Ellen Wangerheim	Hammarby	Linköping	5–0 (A)	29 March 2025
(Sweden) Felicia Schröder (Note: Scored four goals.)	Häcken	Vittsjö	5–1 (H)	12 April 2025
(Sweden) Felicia Schröder	Häcken	Brommapojkarna	6–1 (H)	11 May 2025
(Norway) Sara Kanutte	Malmö	Växjö	4–2 (A)	16 May 2025
(Sweden) Felicia Schröder	Häcken	Piteå	5–0 (A)	19 June 2025
(Norway) Julie Blakstad	Hammarby	Alingsås	7–0 (H)	8 August 2025
(Sweden) Felicia Schröder	Häcken	Djurgården	4–1 (H)	9 August 2025
(Sweden) Hanna Andersson	Rosengård	Linköping	3–1 (H)	16 November 2025
(Australia) Remy Siemsen	Kristianstad	Alingsås	7–1 (H)	16 November 2025

=== Top assists ===
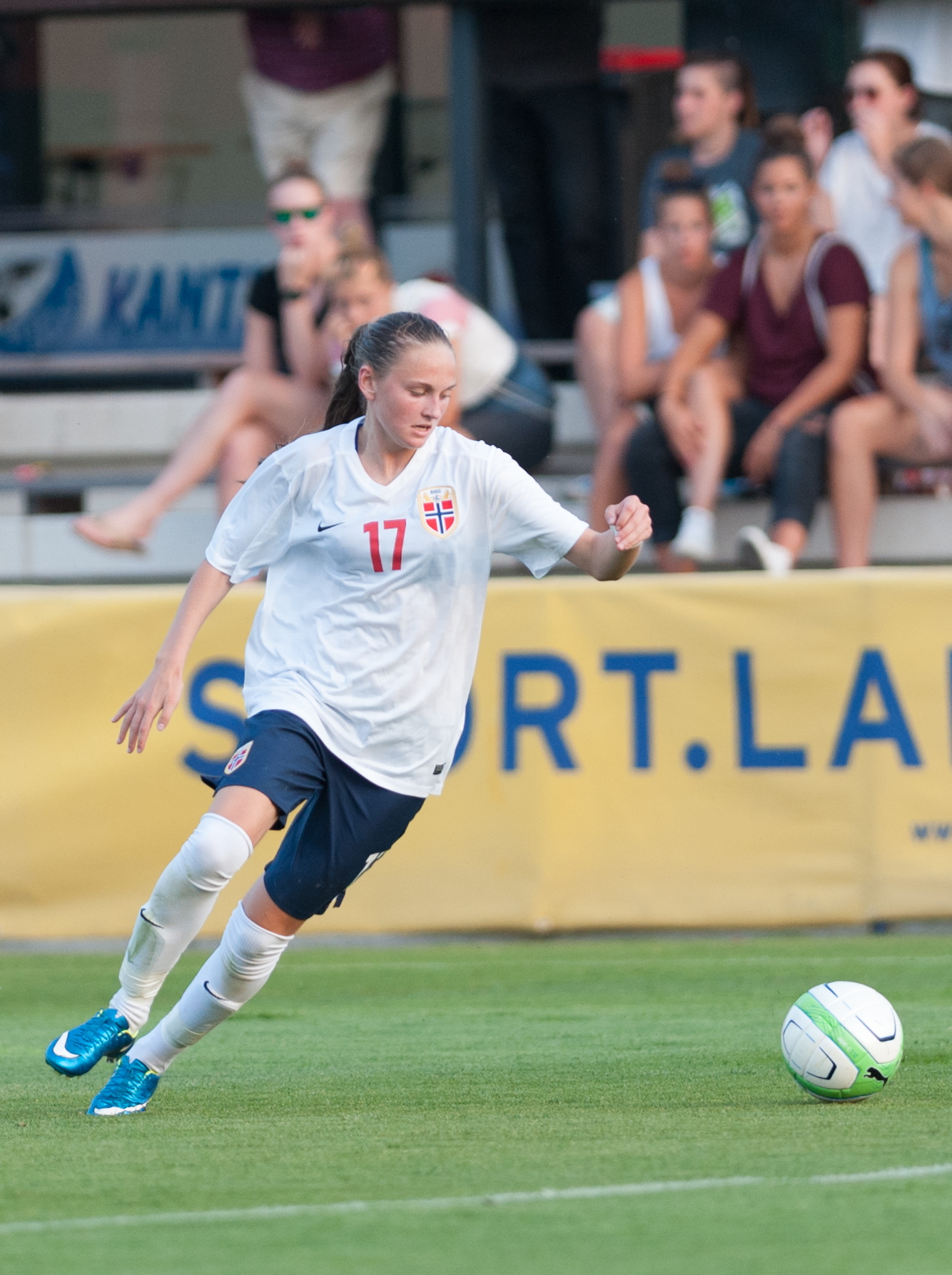
Hammarby's Vilde Hasund finished the season with the most assists, with 12.

Rank	Player	Club	Assists
1	(Norway) Vilde Hasund	Hammarby	12
2	(Sweden) Alice Bergström	Häcken	10
3	(Sweden) Tuva Skoog	Malmö	9
4	(Sweden) Wilma Leidhammar	Norrköping	8
4	(Sweden) Felicia Schröder	Häcken	8
6	(Sweden) Mia Persson	Malmö	7
6	(Sweden) Ellen Wangerheim	Hammarby	7
8	(Sweden) Alice Egnér	Kristianstad	6
8	(Sweden) Hanna Ekengren	Vittsjö	6
8	(Japan) Miho Kamogawa	Växjö	6
8	(Japan) Urara Watanabe	Djurgården	6

=== Clean sheets ===
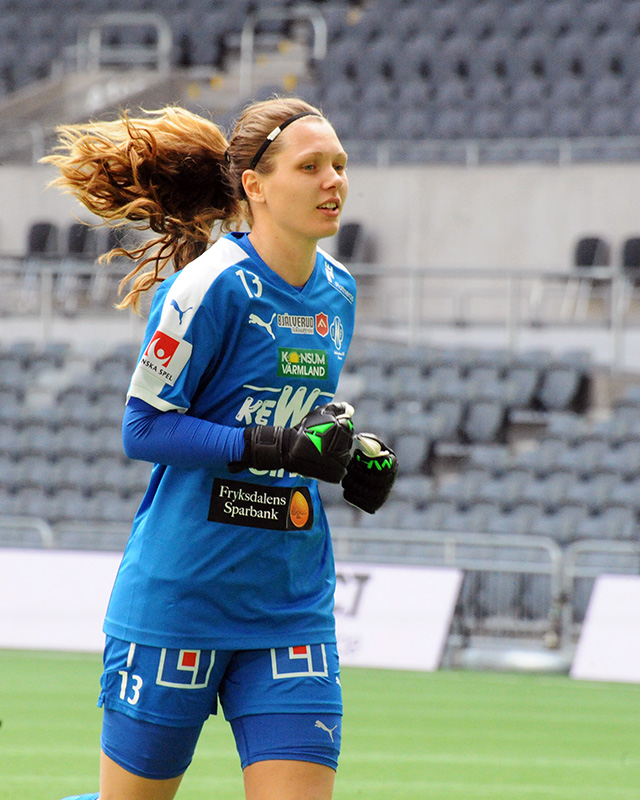
Häcken's Jennifer Falk finished with the most clean sheets, with 11.

Players in italics left during the season

Rank	Player	Club	Clean sheets
1	(Sweden) Jennifer Falk	Häcken	11
2	(Sweden) Moa Öhman	Malmö	9
3	(Australia) Jada Whyman	AIK	7
4	(Germany) Melina Loeck	Hammarby	6
5	(Sweden) Sofia Hjern	Norrköping	5
5	(Finland) Anna Koivunen	Djurgården	5
7	(Hungary) Lauren Brzykcy	Piteå	4
7	(United States) Caroline DeLisle	Norrköping	4
7	(Sweden) Moa Edrud	Hammarby	4
10	(Scotland) Eartha Cumings	Rosengård	3
10	(Iceland) Fanney Birkisdóttir	Häcken	3
10	(United States) Savannah Madden	Vittsjö	3
10	(Sweden) Moa Olsson	Kristianstad	3
10	(Denmark) Maja Bay Østergaard	Växjö	3

=== Discipline ===
==== Player ====
- Most yellow cards: 8
  - (Sweden) Olivia Holm (Piteå)
- Most red cards: 1
  - (Sweden) Serina Backmark (AIK)
  - (Sweden) Johanna Barth (Alingsås)
  - (Sweden) Wilma Carlsson (Piteå)
  - (Sweden) Selina Henriksson (Piteå)
  - (Sweden) Emma Jansson (Rosengård)
  - (Wales) Carrie Jones (Norrköping)
  - (Sweden) Lisa Klinga (Vittsjö)
  - (Finland) Dana Leskinen (Norrköping)
  - (Sweden) Ellen Löfqvist (Malmö)
  - (Sweden) Ina Österlind (Alingsås)
  - (Serbia) Emma Petrović (Kristianstad)
  - (Sweden) Matilda Plan (AIK)
  - (Japan) Haruna Tabata (AIK)
  - (Sweden) Jessica Wik (Norrköping)

==== Club ====
- Most yellow cards: 31
  - Alingsås
- Fewest yellow cards: 13
  - Brommapojkarna
- Most red cards: 3
  - AIK
  - Norrköping
- Fewest red cards: 0
  - Brommapojkarna
  - Djurgården
  - Häcken
  - Hammarby
  - Linköping
  - Växjö

== Awards ==
=== Monthly awards ===
Players in italics left during the season

Month	Player of the Month		Other nominated players			
Month	Player	Club	Player	Club	Player	Club
March	(Sweden) Ellen Wangerheim	Hammarby	(Norway) Therese Åsland	Djurgården	(Sweden) Smilla Holmberg	Hammarby
April	(Sweden) Felicia Schröder	Häcken	(United States) Izzy D'Aquila	Malmö	(United States) Emily Gray	Piteå
May	(Sweden) Beata Olsson	Kristianstad	(Norway) Therese Åsland	Djurgården	(Iceland) Katla Tryggvadóttir	Kristianstad
June	(Sweden) Mia Persson	Malmö	(Norway) Julie Blakstad	Hammarby	(Denmark) Jóhanna Fossdalsá	Häcken
July	Summer break					
August	(Sweden) Mia Persson	Malmö	(Sweden) Wilma Leidhammar	Norrköping	(Sweden) Felicia Schröder	Häcken
September	(Sweden) Mimmi Wahlström	Djurgården	(Sweden) Ida Bengtsson	Brommapojkarna	(Sweden) Julia Karlernäs	Norrköping
October	(Sweden) Anna Anvegård	Häcken	(Sweden) Cecilia Edlund	Piteå	(Sweden) Jessica Wik	Norrköping
November	(Norway) Julie Blakstad	Hammarby	(Sweden) Jennifer Falk	Häcken	(Serbia) Miljana Ivanović	Malmö

=== Seasonal awards ===
2025 Damallsvenskan Awards
Award	Winner	Club
Most Valuable Player	(Sweden) Felicia Schröder	Häcken
Youth Prize	(Sweden) Felicia Schröder	Häcken
Breakthrough of the Year	(Sweden) Smilla Holmberg	Hammarby
Goal of the Year	(Sweden) Anna Anvegård	Häcken
Team of the Year
Goalkeeper of the Year	(Sweden) Jennifer Falk	Häcken
Defender of the Year	(Norway) Julie Blakstad	Hammarby
Midfielder of the Year	(Sweden) Anna Anvegård	Häcken
Forward of the Year	(Sweden) Felicia Schröder	Häcken
Coach of the Year	(Lebanon) Mak Lind	Häcken
