= 2024–25 Svenska Cupen (women) group stage =

Football tournament group stage

The 2024–25 Svenska Cupen group stage is the fourth round of the 43rd iteration of the Swedish national women's cup competition. The group stage consisted of four groups of four teams, the winners of which advanced to the semi-finals.

BK Häcken, FC Rosengård, Hammarby IF and IFK Norrköping advanced to the semi-finals.

== Draw rules ==
The top eight Damallsvenskan teams to advance from round 3 are assigned to groups in a predetermined order, as indicated by the following table:

	Group 1	Group 2	Group 3	Group 4
A	Rank 1	Rank 2	Rank 3	Rank 4
B	Rank 8	Rank 7	Rank 6	Rank 5
C	Draw	Draw	Draw	Draw
D	Draw	Draw	Draw	Draw

The team D is always guaranteed to be the lowest ranked team. The match order and home advantages of the single round-robin tournament are predetermined according to the following schema, where A–D are as defined above.

Match order	Group with 4 Damallsvenskan teams	Group with 3 Damallsvenskan teams	Group with 2 Damallsvenskan teams
1	A – C	A – C	C – A
2	B – D	D – B	D – B
3	D – A	D – A	B – C
4	B – C	B – C	D – A
5	C – D	C – D	C – D
6	A – B	A – B	A – B

== Tiebreakers for group ranking ==
The following criteria are applied (in order from top to bottom) to determine the order of the teams in all groups:

1. The total number of points;
2. Goal difference in all matches;
3. Number of goals scored in all matches;
4. Total number of points obtained in head-to-head match;
5. Goal difference in head-to-head match;
6. Number of goals scored in head-to-head match;
7. Lower disciplinary score determined as: single yellow card = 1 point; single yellow card interrupting a scoring chance = 2 points; second yellow card = 3 points; straight red card = 4 points;
8. Higher rank;

== Groups ==
=== Group 1 ===
Pos	Team	Pld	W	D	L	GF	GA	GD	Pts	Qualification	FCR	MFF	LFC	VDFF
1	FC Rosengård	3	2	1	0	5	2	+3	7	Advance to the semi-finals			2–0	2–1
2	Malmö FF	3	1	1	1	5	5	0	4		1–1			4–3
3	Linköping FC	3	1	1	1	3	4	−1	4			1–0		
4	Växjö DFF	3	0	1	2	6	8	−2	1				2–2	

Source: SvFF
Rules for classification: Tiebreakers

3 March 2025
19:00 CET (UTC+1)

Malmö FF	4–3	Växjö DFF
D'Aquila 22'; Fornes 42', 66', 88'	Report	Bodin 4'; Kamagawa 7', 31'

Malmö IP, Malmö
Attendance: 322
Referee: Cecila Ekwall

4 March 2025
19:00 CET (UTC+1)

FC Rosengård	2–0	Linköping FC
Sevenius 9'; Woldvik 53'	Report

Malmö IP, Malmö
Attendance: 317
Referee: Maral Mirzai

8 March 2025
15:00 CET (UTC+1)

Malmö FF	1–1	FC Rosengård
D'Aquila 45+1'	Report	Cronquist 89'

Stadion, Malmö
Attendance: 8,797
Referee: Selma Griberg

9 March 2025
15:00 CET (UTC+1)

Växjö DFF	2–2	Linköping FC
Redenstrand 78'; Russell 85' (pen.)	Report	Halttunen 12'; Bakker 38'

Teleborg Sports Field, Teleborg
Attendance: 150
Referee: Amane Kandas

17 March 2025
19:00 CET (UTC+1)

Linköping FC	1–0	Malmö FF
Grós 1'	Report

Linköping Arena, Linköping
Attendance: 231
Referee: Cecilia Ekwall

17 March 2025
19:00 CET (UTC+1)

FC Rosengård	2–1	Växjö DFF
Sevenius 44'; Larsson 54'	Report	Níelsdóttir 78'

Malmö IP, Malmö
Attendance: 252
Referee: Hanna Laajanen

=== Group 2 ===
Pos	Team	Pld	W	D	L	GF	GA	GD	Pts	Qualification	BKH	DIF	UIK	VGIK
1	BK Häcken	3	3	0	0	16	3	+13	9	Advance to the semi-finals		4–2		7–1
2	Djurgårdens IF	3	1	1	1	5	5	0	4					2–0
3	Umeå IK	3	0	2	1	2	7	−5	2		0–5	1–1		
4	Vittsjö GIK	3	0	1	2	2	10	−8	1				1–1	

Source: SvFF
Rules for classification: Tiebreakers

2 March 2025
15:00 CET (UTC+1)

Umeå IK	1–1	Djurgårdens IF
Westbom 88'	Report	Larsson 68'

Umeå Energi Arena, Umeå
Referee: Mattias Eriksson

3 March 2025
15:00 CET (UTC+1)

BK Häcken	7–1	Vittsjö GIK
Jusu Bah 25'; 30' (o.g.); Nildén 57', 80'; Schröder 63' (pen.); Jensen 90+1'; Larsson 90+2'	Report	Ekengren 71'

Bravida Arena, Gothenburg
Referee: Selma Griberg

9 March 2025
15:00 CET (UTC+1)

Djurgårdens IF	2–0	Vittsjö GIK
Hammarlund 13'; Pelgander 77'	Report

Kristinebergs IP, Stockholm
Attendance: 133
Referee: Cecilia Ekwall

9 March 2025
15:00 CET (UTC+1)

Umeå IK	0–5	BK Häcken
	Report	Schröder 38' (pen.), 76', 86'; Kitagawa 64'; Tindell 72' (pen.)

Umeå Energi Arena, Umeå
Attendance: 252
Referee: Hugo Evebring

15 March 2025
15:00 CET (UTC+1)

Vittsjö GIK	1–1	Umeå IK
Kolanen 64'	Report	Larsson 15'

Österås IP, Hässleholm
Attendance: 177
Referee: Maral Mirzai

15 March 2025
15:00 CET (UTC+1)

BK Häcken	4–2	Djurgårdens IF
Schröder 23', 39'; Larsson 90'; Nyström 90+3'	Report	Duras 41'; Hammarlund 90+5'

Bravida Arena, Gothenburg
Attendance: 529
Referee: Amanda Nylund Karman

=== Group 3 ===
Pos	Team	Pld	W	D	L	GF	GA	GD	Pts	Qualification	HIF	BP	PIF	AIF
1	Hammarby IF	3	3	0	0	10	2	+8	9	Advance to the semi-finals		3–1	3–1	
2	IF Brommapojkarna	3	1	1	1	5	4	+1	4					3–0
3	Piteå IF	3	1	1	1	3	4	−1	4			1–1		
4	Alingsås IF	3	0	0	3	0	8	−8	0		0–4		0–1	

Source: SvFF
Rules for classification: Tiebreakers

2 March 2025
14:00 CET (UTC+1)

Alingsås IF	0–1	Piteå IF
	Report	Viklund 74'

Gerdskenvallen, Alingsås
Attendance: 120
Referee: Amanda Nylund Karman

2 March 2025
15:00 CET (UTC+1)

Hammarby IF	3–1	IF Brommapojkarna
Hasund 10'; Wangerheim 22', 49'	Report	Thörnqvist 37'

Hammarby IP, Stockholm
Attendance: 1,066
Referee: Eva Svärdsudd

8 March 2025
15:00 CET (UTC+1)

Alingsås IF	0–4	Hammarby IF
	Report	Wangerheim 19', 44', 72'; Ökvist 87'

Gerdskenvallen, Alingsås
Attendance: 301
Referee: Maral Mirzai

9 March 2025
15:00 CET (UTC+1)

Piteå IF	1–1	IF Brommapojkarna
Green 5'	Report	Lillbäck 22'

LF Arena, Piteå
Attendance: 461
Referee: Eva Svärdsudd

16 March 2025
15:00 CET (UTC+1)

IF Brommapojkarna	3–0	Alingsås IF
Bengtsson 30', 53'; Bækkelund 45'	Report

Grimsta IP, Stockholm
Attendance: 52
Referee: Camilla Friberg

16 March 2025
15:00 CET (UTC+1)

Hammarby IF	3–1	Piteå IF
Wangerheim 16', 44'; 58' (o.g.)	Report	Swedman 74'

Hammarby IP, Stockholm
Attendance: 982
Referee: Lovisa Johansson

=== Group 4 ===
Pos	Team	Pld	W	D	L	GF	GA	GD	Pts	Qualification	IFK	KDFF	AIK	KIF
1	IFK Norrköping	3	2	1	0	4	1	+3	7	Advance to the semi-finals			2–0	1–1
2	Kristianstads DFF	3	2	0	1	3	2	+1	6		0–1		2–1	
3	AIK	3	1	0	2	3	5	−2	3					2–1
4	KIF Örebro	3	0	1	2	2	4	−2	1			0–1		

Source: SvFF
Rules for classification: Tiebreakers

1 March 2025
15:00 CET (UTC+1)

IFK Norrköping	1–1	KIF Örebro
Rehnberg 90+3'	Report	Andersson 56'

Nya Parken, Norrköping
Attendance: 324
Referee: Amane Kandas

2 March 2025
15:00 CET (UTC+1)

Kristianstads DFF	2–1	AIK
Siemsen 59'; Nilsson 68'	Report	Reidy 74'

Kristianstads Arena, Kristianstad
Attendance: 153
Referee: Lovisa Johansson

9 March 2025
17:00 CET (UTC+1)

KIF Örebro	0–1	Kristianstads DFF
	Report	Olsson 46'

Eyravallen, Örebro
Attendance: 57
Referee: Erik Enerholm

10 March 2025
19:00 CET (UTC+1)

IFK Norrköping	2–0	AIK
Miliojevic 57'; Leidhammar 68'	Report

Nya Parken, Norrköping
Attendance: 336
Referee: George Jansizian

16 March 2025
17:00 CET (UTC+1)

AIK	2–1	KIF Örebro
Selin 17'; 50' (o.g.)	Report	Gross-Benberg 1'

Skytteholms IP, Stockholm
Attendance: 328
Referee: Ulrica Löv

16 March 2025
17:00 CET (UTC+1)

Kristianstads DFF	0–1	IFK Norrköping
	Report	Conijnenberg 90'

Kristianstads Arena, Kristianstad
Referee: Selma Griberg

== Combined table ==
Pos	Team	Pld	W	D	L	GF	GA	GD	Pts	Qualification
1	BK Häcken	3	3	0	0	16	3	+13	9	Advance to the semi-finals
2	Hammarby IF	3	3	0	0	10	2	+8	9	Advance to the semi-finals
3	FC Rosengård	3	2	1	0	5	2	+3	7	Advance to the semi-finals
4	IFK Norrköping	3	2	1	0	4	1	+3	7	Advance to the semi-finals
5	Kristianstads DFF	3	2	0	1	3	2	+1	6	
6	IF Brommapojkarna	3	1	1	1	5	4	+1	4	
7	Djurgårdens IF	3	1	1	1	5	5	0	4	
8	Malmö FF	3	1	1	1	5	5	0	4	
9	Linköping FC	3	1	1	1	3	4	−1	4	
10	Piteå IF	3	1	1	1	3	4	−1	4	
11	AIK	3	1	0	2	3	5	−2	3	
12	Umeå IK	3	0	2	1	2	7	−5	2	
13	Växjö DFF	3	0	1	2	6	8	−2	1	
14	KIF Örebro	3	0	1	2	2	4	−2	1	
15	Vittsjö GIK	3	0	1	2	2	10	−8	1	
16	Alingsås IF	3	0	0	3	0	8	−8	0	

Source: SvFF
Rules for classification: Tiebreakers

== Top scorers ==
Rank	Player	Team	Goals
1	(Sweden) Ellen Wangerheim	Hammarby	7
2	(Sweden) Felicia Schröder	Häcken	6
3	(Norway) Sara Kanutte Fornes	Malmö	3
4	(Sweden) Ida Bengtsson	Brommapojkarna	2
4	(United States) Izzy D'Aquila	Malmö	2
4	(Sweden) Pauline Hammarlund	Djurgården	2
4	(Japan) Miho Kamogawa	Växjö	2
4	(Sweden) Alexandra Larsson	Häcken	2
4	(Sweden) Matilda Nildén	Häcken	2
4	(Finland) Oona Sevenius	Rosengård	2
10	29 players		1
