= 2024 Elitettan =

Elitettan
- Season: 2024
- Dates: 12 April 2024 – 10 November 2024
- Promoted: Malmö FF; Alingsås IF
- Matches: 133
- Goals: 423 (3.18 per match)
- Top goalscorer: (Sweden) Moa Öhman (15 goals)
- Biggest home win: Alingsås IF 10–0 Sundsvalls DFF; 8 June 2024
- Biggest away win: IFK Kalmar 0–5 Eskilstuna United DFF; 19 May 2024; Lidköpings FK 0–5 Malmö FF; 24 May 2024; Gamla Upsala SK 1–6 IK Uppsala Fotboll; 24 May 2024
- Highest scoring: Alingsås IF 10–0 Sundsvalls DFF; 8 June 2024
- Longest winning run: 7 matches Alingsås IF; Malmö FF
- Longest unbeaten run: 17 matches Alingsås IF
- Longest winless run: 14 matches IFK Kalmar
- Longest losing run: 6 matches Jitex BK
- Highest attendance: 1,723; Malmö FF 0–4 Umeå IK; 13 April 2024
- Lowest attendance: 47; Sundsvalls DFF 2–2 IFK Kalmar; 16 June 2024
- Attendance: 33,911 (255 per match)
- All statistics correct as of 15 September 2024.

The 2024 Elitettan was the 12th season of the Swedish second-tier women's football league.

The schedule for the 2024 edition was published on 16 January 2024. The 2024 Elitettan kicked-off with an advance first matchday bout on 12 April 2024 and concluded on 20 November 2024.

== Teams ==
Locations of teams in the 2024 Elitettan.

Team	Home city	Home ground	Capacity^{a}
Alingsås IF	Alingsås	Mjörnvallen	1,500
Bollstanäs SK	Upplands Väsby	Bollstanäs IP	1,000
Eskilstuna United DFF	Eskilstuna	Tunavallen	7,800
Jitex BK	Mölndal	Åbyvallen	1,500
IFK Kalmar	Kalmar	Gröndals IP	1,500
Lidköpings FK	Lidköping	Framnäs IP	2,500
Mallbackens IF	Lysvik	Strandvallen	2,000
Malmö FF	Malmö	Malmö Stadion	26,500
Örebro SK	Örebro	Eyravallen	12,645
Sundsvalls DFF	Sundsvall	NP3 Arena	8,000
Sunnanå SK	Skellefteå	Norrvalla IP	1,500
Umeå IK	Umeå	Umeå Energi Arena	6,000
IK Uppsala Fotboll	Uppsala	Studenternas IP	10,522
Gamla Upsala SK	Uppsala	Lötens IP	2,500

=== Team changes ===
Entering league		Exiting league	
Promoted from Division 1	Relegated from 2023 Damallsvenskan	Promoted to 2024 Damallsvenskan	Relegated to Division 1
Malmö FF (from Division 1 Södra); Örebro SK (from Division 1 Mellersta); Sunnanå SK (from Division 1 Norra)	IFK Kalmar; IK Uppsala Fotboll	AIK Fotboll; Trelleborgs FF	BK Häcken FF II; Ifö Bromölla IF; IK Rössö

== League table ==
Pos	Team	Pld	W	D	L	GF	GA	GD	Pts	Promotion or relegation
1	Malmö FF (C, P)	26	21	2	3	70	23	+47	65	Promotion to Damallsvenskan
2	Alingsås IF (P)	26	18	6	2	67	21	+46	60	Promotion to Damallsvenskan
3	Umeå IK	26	16	3	7	56	34	+22	51	Qualification for Damallsvenskan play-off
4	IK Uppsala	26	15	1	10	48	31	+17	46	
5	Bollstanäs SK	26	13	4	9	46	35	+11	43	
6	Sunnanå SK	26	11	3	12	33	36	−3	36	
7	Mallbackens IF	26	9	6	11	34	35	−1	33	
8	Jitex BK	26	9	5	12	48	54	−6	32	
9	Eskilstuna United	26	9	4	13	37	42	−5	31	
10	Gamla Upsala	26	9	3	14	41	48	−7	30	
11	Örebro SK	26	7	5	14	31	47	−16	26	
12	Lidköpings FK (R)	26	7	4	15	33	68	−35	25	Relegation to Division 1
13	Sundsvalls DFF (R)	26	4	8	14	20	51	−31	20	Relegation to Division 1
14	IFK Kalmar (R)	26	5	4	17	25	64	−39	19	Relegation to Division 1

Source: SvenskFotboll.se
Rules for classification: 1) Points; 2) Goal difference; 3) Number of goals scored; 4) Head-to-head points; 5) Head-to-head goal difference; 6) Head-to-head away goals scored
(C) Champions; (P) Promoted; (R) Relegated

== Results ==
Home \ Away	ALI	BOL	ESK	JIT	KAL	LID	MAB	MAM	ÖRE	SUD	SUN	UME	UPF	UPG
Alingsås IF	—	3–0	2–1	3–1		3–1			5–0	10–0		3–0	1–2	1–1
Bollstanäs SK		—	4–1	5–4	2–1		0–1	0–2	1–0	0–3		4–5	2–0	1–2
Eskilstuna United DFF	1–1		—	2–0		1–0			2–0	0–0	2–3	1–2	2–1	1–0
Jitex BK		0–2	4–2	—		5–0	0–2		4–2	2–0	1–2	2–3		
IFK Kalmar	0–3	2–1	0–5	3–3	—	1–3	2–1	0–0			0–4	0–0		0–4
Lidköpings FK		3–3		1–0		—		0–5	0–4	2–1	3–1	1–2	1–4	2–2
Mallbackens IF	1–2	0–0	2–1	2–2	3–0	0–2	—	0–1	4–1		0–2		1–2	
Malmö FF	2–2		3–1	3–1	3–1	9–0	1–2	—	3–1	2–1		0–4		1–0
Örebro SK	0–4	1–0	1–1		3–0	3–1	0–1		—	1–1	2–2		1–0	0–2
Sundsvalls DFF		0–2		1–1	2–2		0–0	0–4	1–2	—	0–0		1–0	0–3
Sunnanå SK	0–4	1–3	3–1		1–2	3–1	2–1	0–2		2–0	—	0–1		
Umeå IK	1–3				3–0	2–1	5–0	2–3	2–1	0–1	1–0	—	1–2	3–1
IK Uppsala Fotboll	0–1	1–2	1–0	1–2	5–0			1–3		1–0	1–0	1–4	—	1–0
Gamla Upsala SK	1–4		2–0	3–1	2–1	2–1	2–3	1–2			1–2		1–6	—

Updated to match(es) played on 15 September 2024. Source: SvenskFotboll.se
Legend: Blue = home team win; Yellow = draw; Red = away team win.

== Top goalscorers ==
As of 15 September 2024

Rank	Player	Team	Goals
1	(Sweden) Moa Öhman	Alingsås IF	15
2	(Sweden) Louise Lillbäck	Bollstanäs SK	11
3	(Sweden) Olivia Alcaide	Jitex BK	9
3	(Sweden) Wilma Dahlgren	Sunnanå SK	9
3	(Sweden) Alma Öberg	Alingsås IF	9
3	(Sweden) Ema Paljevic	Malmö FF	9
7	(Sweden) Rebecca Cameras	Alingsås IF	8
7	(Sweden) Alma Davis	Umeå IK	8
7	(Sweden) Julia Elvbo	Lidköpings FK	8
7	(Sweden) Tove Lorén	Alingsås IF	8
7	(Sweden) Ina Österlind	Alingsås IF	8
7	(United States) Nicole Robertson	Eskilstuna United DFF	8
