= Bella Sember =

American soccer player (born 2003)

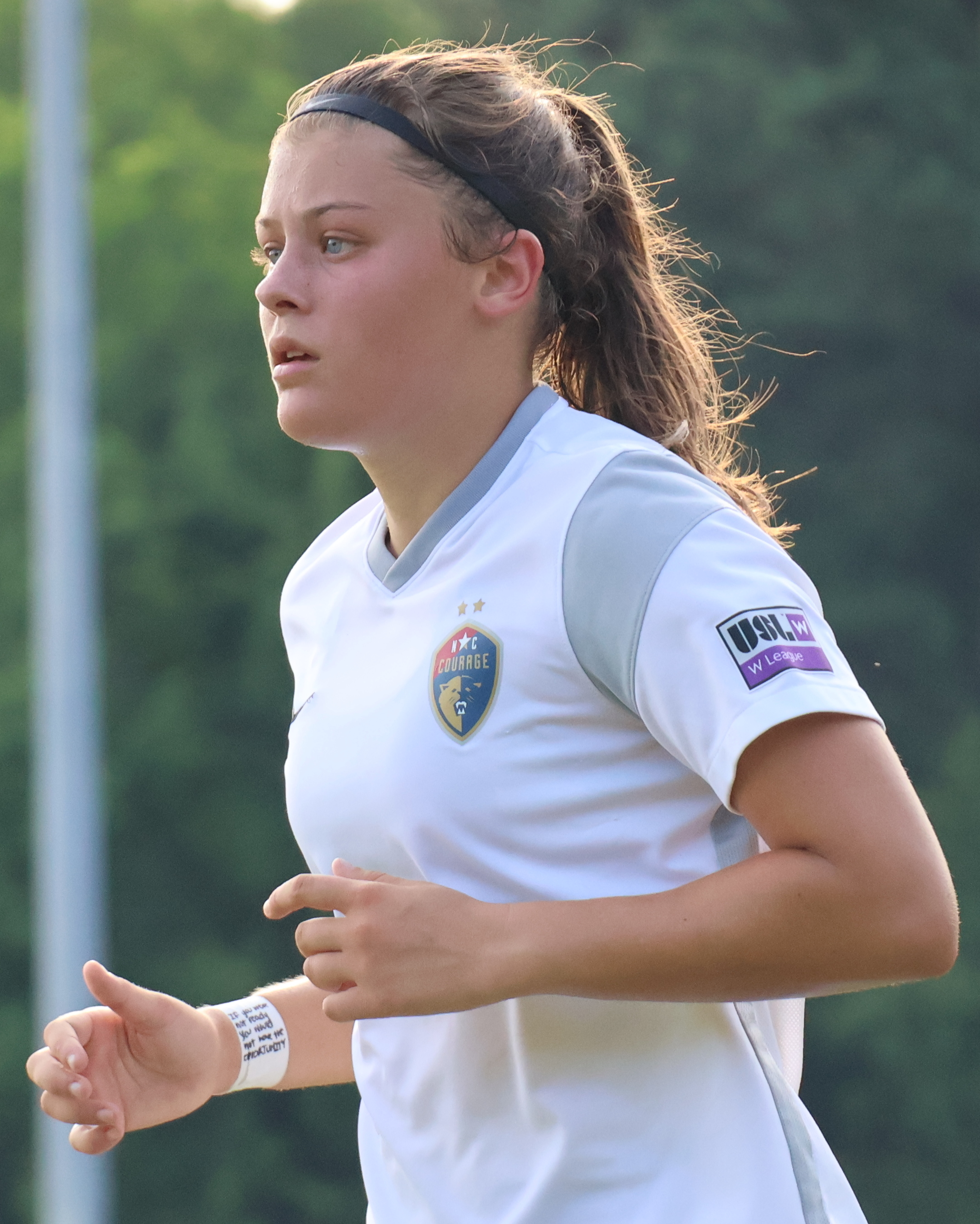
- Sember with the North Carolina Courage U23 in 2024

Personal information
- Full name: Bella Victoria Sember
- Date of birth: September 10, 2003 (age 23)
- Height: 5 ft 7 in (1.70 m)
- Position: Midfielder

Team information
- Current team: Eskilstuna United
- Number: 18

Youth career
- New York City FC

College career
Years	Team	Apps	(Gls)
2021–2024	North Carolina Tar Heels	82	(13)

Senior career*
Years	Team	Apps	(Gls)
2021–2022	Downtown United Soccer Club	–	(11)
2023	Long Island Rough Riders	6	(7)
2024	North Carolina Courage U23	5	(3)
2025	KIF Örebro	26	(14)
2026–	Eskilstuna United	11	(1)

International career
2019	United States U-17		
- * Club domestic league appearances and goals as of June 24, 2026

Bella Victoria Sember (born September 10, 2003) is an American professional soccer player who plays as a midfielder for Damallsvenskan club Eskilstuna United. She played college soccer for the North Carolina Tar Heels, winning the 2024 national championship. She began her professional career with Swedish club KIF Örebro in 2025.

== Early life ==
Sember grew up in Centerport, New York, the oldest of four children born to Dana Porciello and Paul Sember. She began playing soccer when she was three. She played club soccer for New York City FC's academy. She also played futsal and was called into the futsal youth national team in 2015, 2023, and 2024. She committed to the University of North Carolina during her freshman year at Harborfields High School in Greenlawn, New York.

== College career ==
Sember scored 2 goals in 32 appearances off the bench during her first two seasons with the North Carolina Tar Heels. She was an unused substitute as a sophomore in the 2022 national title game, where North Carolina lost to UCLA. In her junior season in 2023, she appeared in all 23 games (1 start) and scored 3 goals with 1 assist. She scored two goals during the NCAA tournament, including the lone goal against Texas Tech in the third round, as North Carolina reached the quarterfinals.

Sember played a bigger role in her senior season in 2024, becoming one of the team's captains after only 12 players returned to the team. She appeared in all 27 games (23 starts) and scored a team-third-high 8 goals (half of them penalties) with 4 assists. In the NCAA tournament, she opened scoring with a penalty in the first round. She started the first four games of the tournament, before seeing limited minutes in the semifinal and final, as North Carolina won their 23rd national title and first since 2012.

While in college, Sember played during the summer with the WPSL's Downtown United Soccer Club in 2021 and 2022, the USL W League's Long Island Rough Riders in 2023, and the USL W League champion North Carolina Courage U23 in 2024. She also helped the US Women–sponsored team win the Soccer Tournament 2024, scoring in the final and several games leading up to the final.

== Club career ==
=== KIF Örebro ===
On January 4, 2025, newly relegated Elitettan club KIF Örebro announced that they had signed Sember to her first professional contract on a one-year deal. KIF Örebro's sporting director said she possessed Damallsvenskan quality and could have signed in the top flight. She made her professional debut on March 1, starting and playing the entire match in a 1–1 draw with Norrköping in the Swedish Cup group stage. On April 19, she scored her first professional goal in her home league debut, though her side lost 2–1 to Trelleborg.

On October 11, Sember scored her tenth goal of the season in a 3–2 win over city rivals Örebro SK. She said before the game that she was "a little surprised" to have scored so many good goals, especially from distance. The following game, she scored against Mallbacken as KIF Örebro extended their league unbeaten run to 17 games. On November 15, she scored in the season finale against Sunnanå, confirming KIF Örebro's place in the promotion playoffs, where they were unable to overcome Brommapojkarna. She finished her rookie season with 15 goals in 32 games in all competitions, including 14 goals in the league (tied for first on the team and third in the league).

=== Eskilstuna United ===
On November 24, 2025, Sember signed a two-year contract with newly promoted Damallsvenskan club Eskilstuna United. On March 28, 2026, she made her debut for the club as the season began with a 2–1 defeat to Vittsjö. On May 3, she scored her first goal for the club – and first Damallsvenskan goal – in a 2–0 win over Norrköping.

== International career ==
Sember trained with the United States youth national team at the under-14, under-15, and under-17 levels from 2016 to 2020, scoring for the under-17 team against the Republic of Ireland at the UEFA Development Tournament in 2019.

== Honors and awards ==
North Carolina Tar Heels

- NCAA Division I women's soccer tournament: 2024
- Atlantic Coast Conference: 2022

North Carolina Courage U23

- USL W League: 2024
