= Ellen Wangerheim =

Swedish footballer (born 2004)

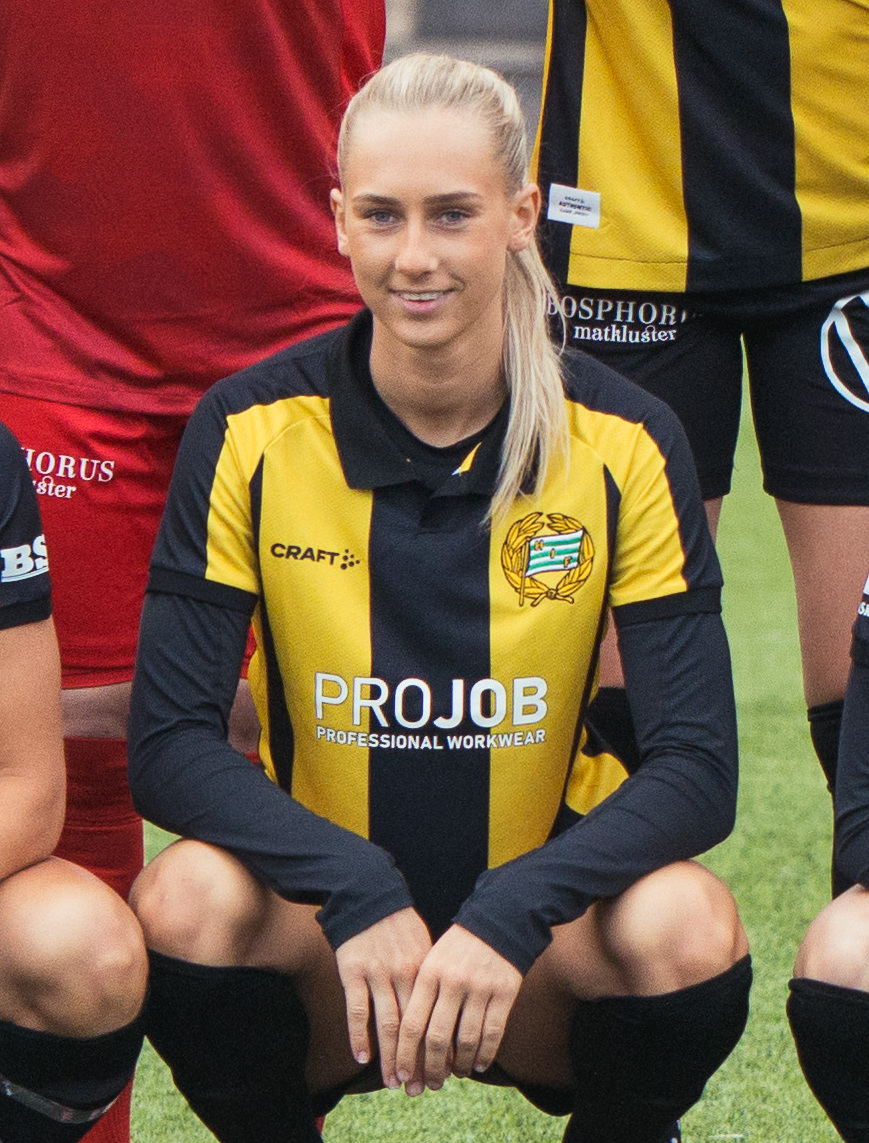
- Wangerheim with Hammarby in 2025

Personal information
- Full name: Ellen Ingergerd Wangerheim
- Date of birth: 1 September 2004 (age 22)
- Position: Forward

Team information
- Current team: Manchester United
- Number: 19

Youth career
- Nacka FC

Senior career*
Years	Team	Apps	(Gls)
2020–2025	Hammarby IF	109	(42)
2026–	Manchester United	8	(0)

International career^{‡}
2021–2022	Sweden U18	0	(0)
2022–2023	Sweden U19	7	(3)
2021–	Sweden U23	11	(5)
2025–	Sweden	5	(0)
- * Club domestic league appearances and goals as of 00:55, 17 May 2026 (UTC) ‡ National team caps and goals as of 20:00, 15 March 2026 (UTC)

Ellen Ingergerd Wangerheim (born 1 September 2004) is a Swedish professional footballer who plays as a forward for Women's Super League club Manchester United and the Sweden national team.

== Club career ==
=== Hammarby IF ===
Spending her youth career at Nacka FC, Wangerheim joined Hammarby in 2020 as a 15-year-old when the club was promoted from the Elitettan. In May 2022, Wangerheim suffered a cruciate ligament injury just minutes after scoring a goal at Brommapojkarna and was sidelined for around 13 months.

In 2023, she scored eight league goals to help Hammarby win both the OBOS Damallsvenskan (Swedish league) title and the Svenska Cupen (Swedish Cup). This completed a historic domestic double for the club. In 2024, Wangerheim developed into a prolific goalscorer for Hammarby, netting 13 times in the league. On 21 November 2024, Wangerheim scored her first UEFA Women's Champions League goal in a 2-1 loss against Manchester City.

Wangerheim scored a career-best tally of 17 goals in the 2025 Damallsvenskan and she fired Hammarby to the 2024-25 Svenska Cupen trophy, remarkably scoring 11 times in just six matches to finish as the cup's top scorer. On 21 May 2025, Wangerheim scored both goals as Hammarby beat Norrköping 2-0 in the Swedish Cup final. Regarded as an emerging talent in Swedish women's football, the rising star reportedly attracted interest from several top European clubs, including Women's Super League (WSL) clubs Chelsea and Manchester City and Frauen-Bundesliga club Wolfsburg. She scored 65 goals and made 136 appearances for Hammarby during her six years at the club.

=== Manchester United ===
On 16 January 2026, English Women's Super League club Manchester United announced that they had signed Wangerheim on a three-year contract until June 2029. The Swede made her United debut on 18 January in a 5-0 Women's FA Cup win over Burnley.

== International career ==
Wangerheim played for Sweden's youth national teams between 2021 and 2023. On 4 April 2025, she made her senior debut for Sweden, coming on for Stina Blackstenius during a 3-2 UEFA Women's Nations League victory against Italy in Solna.

She was included in Sweden's squad for the UEFA Women's Euro 2025. Wangerheim made two substitute appearances at the tournament as Sweden were knocked out on penalties by eventual winners England in the quarter-finals.

== Career statistics ==
=== Club ===
As of match played 18 November 2026

Appearances and goals by club, season and competition
Club	Season	League			National Cup		Europe		Other		Total	
Club	Season	Division	Apps	Goals	Apps	Goals	Apps	Goals	Apps	Goals	Apps	Goals
Hammarby	2020	Elitettan	15	2	—		—		—		15	2
Hammarby	2021	Damallsvenskan	22	0	—		—		—		22	0
Hammarby	2022	Damallsvenskan	8	2	4 (Note: Appearances in Svenska Cupen)	3	—		—		12	5
Hammarby	2023	Damallsvenskan	14	8	—		—		—		14	8
Hammarby	2024	Damallsvenskan	25	13	1	0	—		—		26	13
Hammarby	2025	Damallsvenskan	25	17	6	11	7 (Note: Appearances in UEFA Women's Champions League)	1	—		38	29
Hammarby	2026	Damallsvenskan	—		—		6 (Note: Two appearances in UEFA Women's Champions League, four appearances in UEFA Women's Europa Cup)	6	—		6	6
Hammarby	Total		109	42	11	14	13	7	—		133	63
Manchester United	2025–26	Women's Super League	8	0	2 (Note: Appearances in Women's FA Cup)	0	2	0	2 (Note: Appearances in FA Women's League Cup/WSL Players Cup)	0	14	0
Manchester United	2026–27	Women's Super League	0	0	0	0	—		5	1	5	1
Manchester United	Total		8	0	2	0	2	0	7	1	19	1
Career total			117	42	13	14	15	7	7	1	152	64

== Honours ==
Hammarby IF

- Svenska Cupen: 2022–23, 2024–25
- Damallsvenskan: 2023

Manchester United

- Women's League Cup runner-up: 2025–26
