= Sarah Mellouk =

Swedish footballer

Personal information
- Full name: Sarah Mellouk
- Date of birth: 21 August 1998 (age 28)
- Place of birth: Trelleborg, Sweden
- Position: Midfielder

Team information
- Current team: Malmö FF
- Number: 26

Youth career
- FC Rosengård

Senior career*
Years	Team	Apps	(Gls)
2013–2014	FC Rosengård	7	(2)
2015–2016	Umeå IK	27	(1)
2016–2017	Kopparbergs/Göteborg FC		
2017–2019	Jitex BK	34	(9)
2019–2022	Umeå IK	73	(9)
2023–	Malmö FF	7	(6)
2024–	→ Team TG (loan)	0	(0)

International career^{‡}
2013–2014	Sweden U17	8	(0)
2016	Sweden U19	2	(0)
2019	Sweden U23	9	(0)
- * Club domestic league appearances and goals as of 15 March 2023 ‡ National team caps and goals as of 18 July 2022

Sarah Mellouk (born 21 August 1998 in Trelleborg) is a Swedish footballer who plays for Malmö FF in the Division 1. Mellouk is of Algerian descent.

== Honours ==
FC Rosengård

- Damallsvenskan: 2013, 2014

Umeå IK

- Elitettan: 2019, 2021

Jitex BK

- Division 1 Mellersta Götaland: 2017, 2018

Malmö FF

- Division 1 Södra: 2023
