= Emma Lennartsson =

Swedish footballer (born 1991)

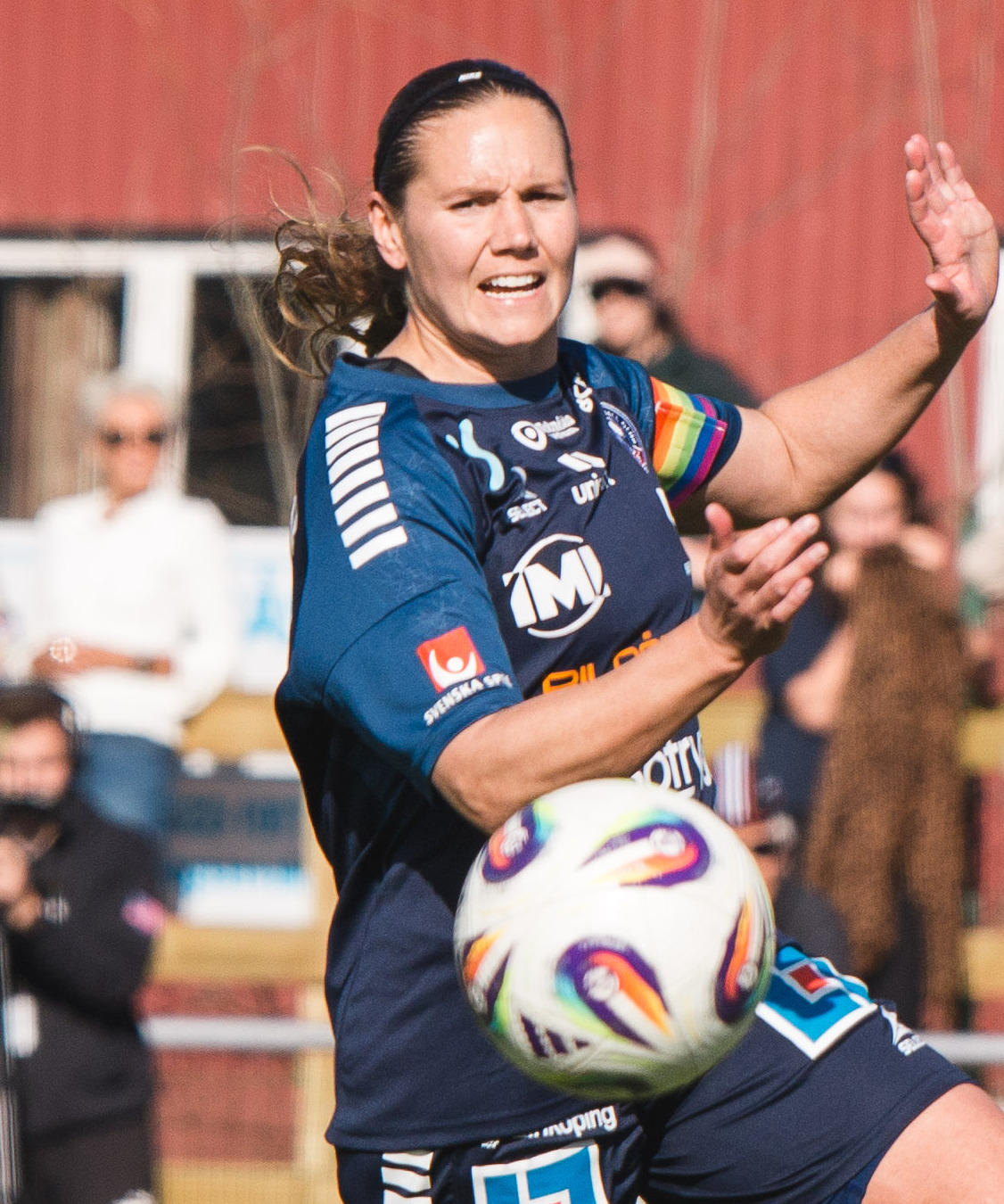
- Lennartsson with Linköpings in 2025

Personal information
- Full name: Emma Lennartsson
- Date of birth: 23 April 1991 (age 35)
- Place of birth: Norrköping, Sweden
- Height: 1.72 m (5 ft 8 in)
- Position: Defender

Senior career*
Years	Team	Apps	(Gls)
2011–2012	IFK Norrköping DFK	41	(7)
2013–2025	Linköpings	255	(12)
- * Club domestic league appearances and goals as of 02:24, 19 June 2025 (UTC)

Emma Lennartsson (born 23 April 1991) is a Swedish former football player who played as a central defender for Linköpings in Sweden's Damallsvenskan for 13 seasons with 255 appearances.

== Honours ==
Linköpings FC

Winner

- Damallsvenskan: 2016, 2017
- Svenska Cupen (2): 2013–14, 2014–15

Runner-up

- Svenska Supercupen: 2015

== Personal life ==
Lennartsson is in a relationship with Norwegian footballer and former Linköping teammate Frida Maanum.
