= Tor-Arne Fredheim =

Swedish footballer and manager

Personal information
- Full name: Tor-Arne Fredheim
- Date of birth: 5 November 1962 (age 63)
- Place of birth: Hallstahammar, Sweden
- Height: 1.80 m (5 ft 11 in)
- Position: Midfielder

Youth career
- 1970–1979: Hallstahammars SK

Senior career*
Years	Team	Apps	(Gls)
1980–1983	Hallstahammars SK		
1984–1992	IFK Norrköping		
1993–1994	Linköpings FF		
1995–1996	Åby IF		

Managerial career
- 1995–1996: Åby IF (player-manager)
- 1997–2000: IFK Norrköping (assistant)
- 2001: IFK Norrköping
- 2005–2009: IK Sleipner
- 2010–2011: IF Sylvia
- 2011–2015: Ljungskile SK
- 2016: Assyriska FF
- 2017: FC Trollhättan
- 2018: Västerås SK
- 2019: Åtvidabergs FF
- 2020–2021: Ljungskile SK
- 2021–2024: IFK Norrköping women
- 2025: Östersund
- * Club domestic league appearances and goals

Tor-Arne Fredheim (born 5 November 1962) is a Swedish football manager and former player.

== Career ==
A midfielder, Fredheim started out his playing career in hometown club Hallstahammars SK before moving to IFK Norrköping where he played for eight seasons and won the Swedish league.

== Manager career ==
He was appointed manager of FC Trollhättan on 25 November 2016.

== Honours ==
=== Club ===
IFK Norrköping

- Swedish champions: 1989
