= Sara Kanutte =

Swedish association football player

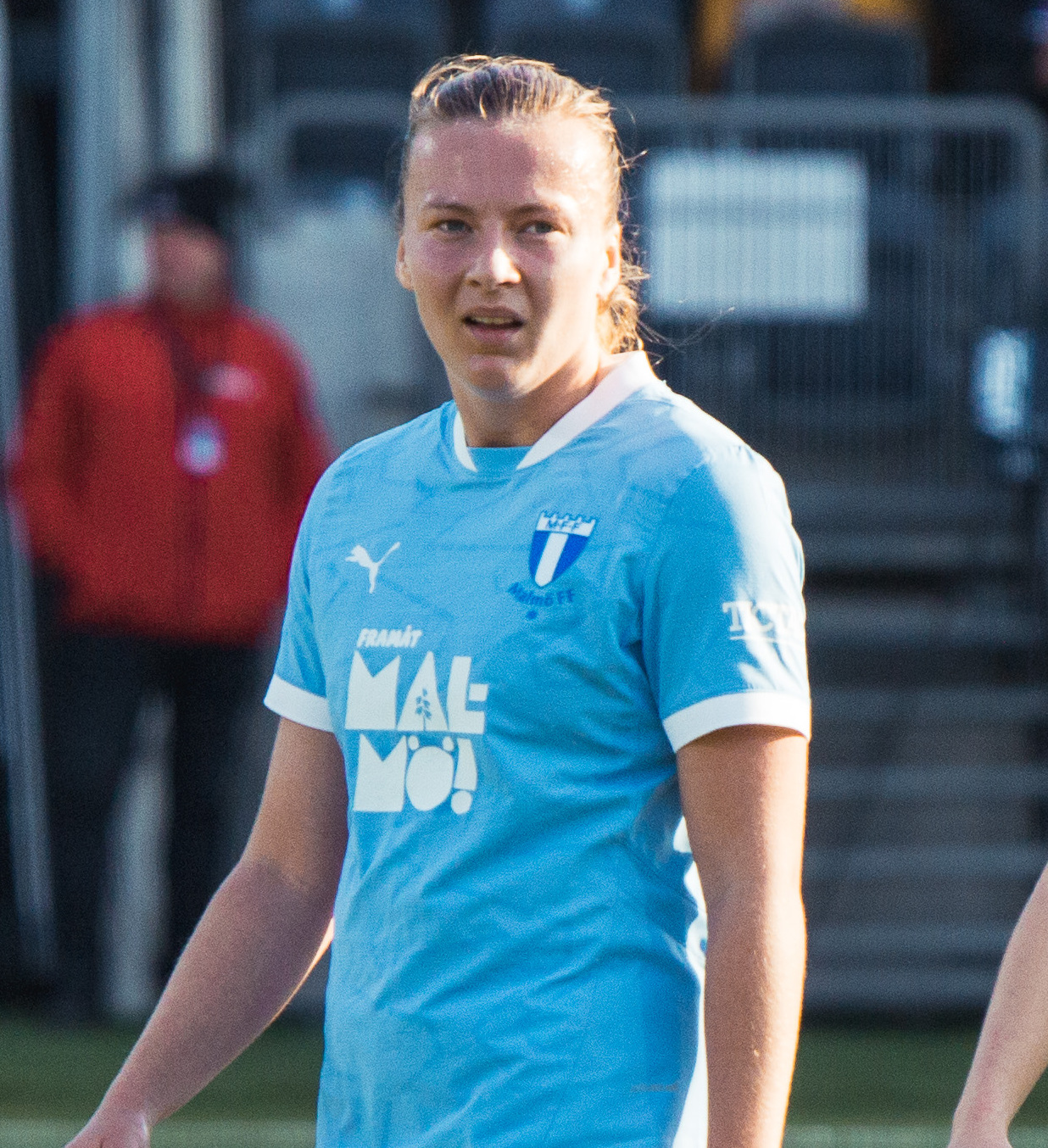
- Fornes with Malmö in 2025

Personal information
- Full name: Sara Kanutte Sørensen Fornes
- Date of birth: 1 December 2001 (age 24)
- Position: Forward

Team information
- Current team: AC Milan
- Number: 9

Youth career
- Gossen

Senior career*
Years	Team	Apps	(Gls)
2016–2018	Træff	27	(50)
2018–2022	Rosenborg (Note: Known as Trondheims-Ørn until February 2020.)	75	(19)
2023–2025	Hammarby	23	(14)
2024	→ Norrköping (loan)	27	(11)
2025–2026	Malmö	36	(24)
2026–	AC Milan	0	(0)

International career^{‡}
2017	Norway U16	8	(3)
2018	Norway U17	6	(1)
2018–2019	Norway U19	7	(2)
2021–	Norway U23	14	(1)
- * Club domestic league appearances and goals as of 27 June 2026 ‡ National team caps and goals as of 3 July 2025

Sara Kanutte Sørensen Fornes (born 1 December 2001) is a Norwegian professional footballer who plays as a forward for Serie A Women club AC Milan and the Norway under-23 national team.

== Early life ==
Kanutte grew up on the island of Gossa in Møre og Romsdal. She first played for Gossen IL during her youth before beginning her career in Norway's Division 3 at SK Træff. She debuted at just 15 years old.

In 2018, Kanutte moved to Toppserien club SK Trondheims-Ørn (renamed Rosenborg BK in February 2020).

In 2023, Kanutte moved to Sweden to join Damallsvenskan club Hammarby IF, where she was usually a substitute. She was loaned out to IFK Norrköping for the 2024 season, where she became a regular starter.

In 2025, Kanutte stayed in the Damallsvenskan and signed for newly-promoted but well-invested side Malmö FF.

On 29 June 2026, Italian Serie A club AC Milan announced the signing of Kanutte on a three-year deal.
