= Moa Öhman (footballer, born 1998) =

Swedish association football player

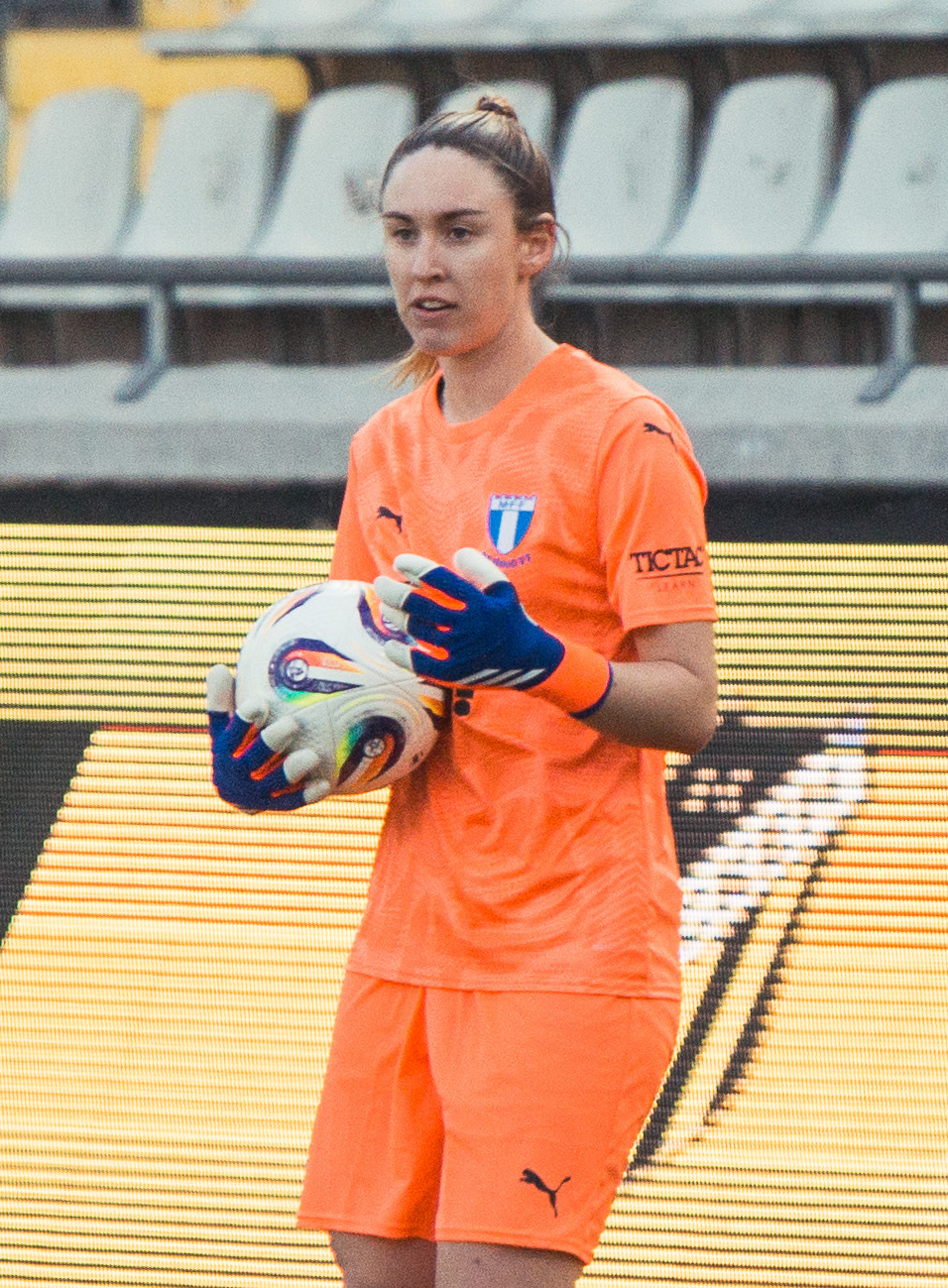
- Öhman with Malmö in 2025

Personal information
- Full name: Signe Karin Moa Öhman
- Date of birth: 25 June 1998 (age 28)
- Height: 1.75 m (5 ft 9 in)
- Position: Goalkeeper

Team information
- Current team: Malmö FF
- Number: 31

Youth career
- Piteå

Senior career*
Years	Team	Apps	(Gls)
2016–2019	Piteå	0	(0)
2017	→ Assi (loan)	1	(0)
2019–2020	Kungsbacka	19	(0)
2020–2023	KIF Örebro	11	(0)
2023–2024	Piteå	19	(0)
2024–	Malmö FF	22	(0)

International career^{‡}
2014	Sweden U17	6	(0)
2016–2017	Sweden U19	10	(0)
- * Club domestic league appearances and goals as of 16 October 2025 ‡ National team caps and goals as of 24 October 2025

Signe Karin Moa Öhman (born 25 June 1998) is a Swedish professional footballer who plays as a goalkeeper for Damallsvenskan club Malmö FF.

A product of Piteå IF's academy, Öhman has played for several clubs across the Swedish football pyramid.

== International career ==
As a youth international, Öhman represented Sweden at the UEFA Women's Under-17 Championship in 2014–15 and at the UEFA Women's Under-19 Championship in 2015–16 and 2016–17.

On 15 October 2025, Öhman was included in the senior national team's squad for Sweden's match against Spain in the 2025 UEFA Women's Nations League Finals. The squad was the team's first under new manager Tony Gustavsson, and she was included alongside two other goalkeepers (BK Häcken's Jennifer Falk and Vålerenga IF's Tove Enblom).
