= Dana Leskinen =

Finnish footballer (born 2001)

Personal information
- Date of birth: 22 September 2001 (age 25)
- Place of birth: Espoo, Finland
- Height: 1.60 m (5 ft 3 in)
- Position: Forward

Team information
- Current team: Copenhagen
- Number: 12

Senior career*
Years	Team	Apps	(Gls)
2017	Honka	0	(0)
2017–2019	TSG Hoffenheim II	22	(5)
2019–2020	Honka	34	(11)
2021–2023	Åland United	58	(24)
2024	1. FC Nürnberg	2	(0)
2024–2025	IFK Norrköping	45	(2)
2026	Parma	7	(1)
2026–	Copenhagen	7	(1)

International career^{‡}
2018	Finland U17	7	(1)
2019–2020	Finland U19	8	(3)
2021–2024	Finland U23	7	(5)
2024–	Finland	3	(0)
- * Club domestic league appearances and goals as of 05:42, 6 October 2026 (UTC) ‡ National team caps and goals as of 1 December 2025

Dana Leskinen (born 22 September 2001) is a Finnish professional footballer who plays as a forward for A-Liga club Copenhagen and the Finland national team.

== Club career ==
Leskinen scored her first goal for TSG Hoffenheim II on 26 November 2017, scoring against VfL Sindelfingen in the 6th minute. She scored her second goal for the club against FC Bayern Munich II on 11 March 2018, scoring in the 84th minute.

On 24 November 2020, it was announced that Leskinen would join Åland United for the 2021 season from Honka. During her time at Åland United, she won a bronze medal. Leskinen remained with the team for the 2022 season. She was part of the team that won the 2022 Finnish Cup.

In 2024, Leskinen was announced at 1. FC Nürnberg. She decided to cancel her contract with 1. FC Nürnberg.

On 17 April 2024, Leskinen was announced at IFK Norrköping. She made her league debut against Djurgårdens IF Fotboll on 19 April 2024. On 28 September 2024, Leskinen scored her first goal for the club against Vittsjö GIK, scoring in the 55th minute.

== International career ==
Leskinen represented Finland U17 at the 2018 FIFA U-17 Women's World Cup in Uruguay.

On 4 April 2021, Leskinen was called up to the Finland squad for a match against Austria, replacing Kaisa Collin due to an injury.

On 28 May 2024, Leskinen was called up to the Finland squad for a European Championship qualifying match against Netherlands, replacing Tiia Peltonen for health reasons. She made her debut for the international side on 31 May 2024, coming on in the 83rd minute for Jutta Rantala.
