= Alingsås IF (women) =

Swedish football club

- Full name: Alingsås Idrottsförening Fotboll
- Nickname: AIF
- Ground: Mjörnvallen, Alingsås
- Sports Director: Robert Ranieri
- League: Elitettan
- 2025: ▼14th, Damallsvenskan (relegated)
Home colours	Away colours

Alingsås IF (Swedish: [ˈɑːlɪŋˌsoːs iːɛf]) is a Swedish women's football club based in Alingsås, West Gothia. It is the women's section of Alingsås IF. The club plays in the Damallsvenskan, following promotion from the Elitettan in 2024.
