= Therese Åsland =

Norwegian footballer (born 1995)

Personal information
- Full name: Therese Sessy Åsland
- Date of birth: 26 August 1995 (age 31)
- Place of birth: Stavanger, Norway
- Height: 1.63 m (5 ft 4 in)
- Position: Forward

Team information
- Current team: Djurgårdens IF
- Number: 11

Senior career*
Years	Team	Apps	(Gls)
2011–2012	Klepp	37	(4)
2013	Avaldsnes	7	(0)
2013–2015	Klepp	56	(6)
2016–2018	Røa	64	(10)
2019	LSK Kvinner	22	(2)
2020–2021	Kristianstad	44	(9)
2022	Brann	22	(6)
2023	Madrid CFF	8	(0)
2023–	Djurgården	40	(10)

International career^{‡}
2010	Norway U16	3	(1)
2011	Norway U17	9	(5)
2011–2012	Norway U18	8	(0)
2013	Norway U20	5	(1)
2014–2018	Norway U23	9	(0)
2018–	Norway	6	(1)
- * Club domestic league appearances and goals as of 18:30, 27 April 2025 (UTC) ‡ National team caps and goals as of 20:40, 3 June 2019

Therese Åsland (born 26 August 1995) is a Norwegian footballer who plays for Djurgårdens IF and the Norway women's national football team. She was selected to the team representing Norway at the 2019 FIFA Women's World Cup.

== Club career ==
=== Brann ===
In December 2021, Åsland became the first signing for the newly formed women's side of Brann.

In July 2023, she joined Djurgården. In February 2025, she was appointed captain of the team.

== Career statistics ==
As of 9 July 2020

Club	Season	Division	League		Cup		Continental		Total	
Club	Season	Division	Apps	Goals	Apps	Goals	Apps	Goals	Apps	Goals
Klepp	2011	Toppserien	15	2	1	0	-		16	2
Klepp	2012	Toppserien	22	2	2	0	-		24	2
Klepp	Total		37	4	3	0	-	-	40	4
Avaldsnes	2013	Toppserien	7	0	0	0	-		7	0
Avaldsnes	Total		7	0	0	0	-	-	7	0
Klepp	2013	Toppserien	13	2	2	0	-		15	2
Klepp	2014	Toppserien	21	2	3	2	-		24	4
Klepp	2015	Toppserien	22	2	2	0	-		24	2
Klepp	Total		56	6	7	2	-	-	63	8
Røa	2016	Toppserien	20	3	5	3	-		25	6
Røa	2017	Toppserien	22	3	2	0	-		24	3
Røa	2018	Toppserien	22	4	4	4	-		26	8
Røa	Total		64	10	11	7	-	-	75	17
LSK Kvinner	2019	Toppserien	21	2	4	3	2	0	27	5
LSK Kvinner	Total		21	2	4	3	2	0	27	5
Kristianstad	2020	Damallsvenskan	2	0	0	0	-		2	0
Kristianstad	Total		2	0	0	0	-	-	2	0
Career total			187	22	25	12	2	0	214	34
