= Mia Persson =

Swedish footballer (born 1990)

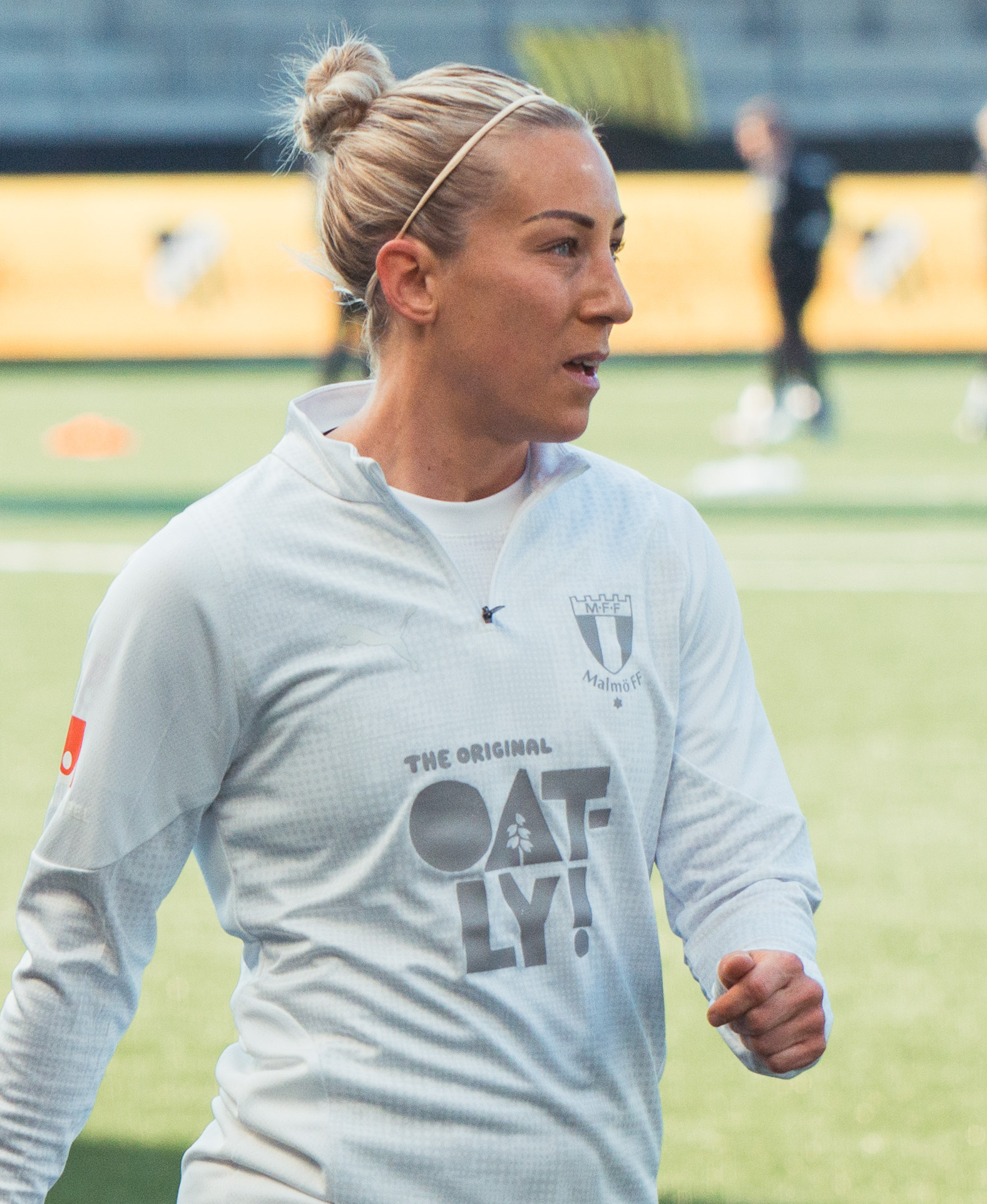
- Persson with Malmö in 2025

Personal information
- Full name: Mia Johanna Persson
- Date of birth: 15 July 1990 (age 36)
- Position: Midfielder

Team information
- Current team: Malmö
- Number: 8

Youth career
- 2003–2008: Sjöbo

College career
Years	Team	Apps	(Gls)
2008–2013	Lindsey Wilson Blue Raiders		

Senior career*
Years	Team	Apps	(Gls)
2013–2019	Limhamn Bunkeflo	124	(50)
2019–2021	Slavia Prague	7	(1)
2021–2024	Rosengård	59	(10)
2024–	Malmö	25	(8)
- * Club domestic league appearances and goals as of 3 July 2025

Mia Johanna Persson (born 15 July 1990) is a Swedish professional footballer who plays as a midfielder for Malmö FF.

== Youth and college career ==
Persson began her career at Sjöbo IF in Sweden's Division 1 at the age of 13. After high school, Persson moved to the United States to play for college team Lindsey Wilson Blue Raiders. At Lindsey Wilson, she won offensive player of the week in October 2012.

== Club career ==
After college, Persson returned to Sweden and signed for IF Limhamn Bunkeflo, where she became a key player and was the club's captain for several years. After four seasons in the Elitettan, Persson helped the club earn promotion to the Damallsvenskan in 2017.

In 2019, Persson moved to the Czech Republic to play for Slavia Prague in the Czech Women's First League, where she won two league titles and played Champions League football for the first time in her career. She played in the Champions League again the following year.

In 2021, Persson moved back to Sweden to play for FC Rosengård, where she won two league titles and a Svenska Cupen as well as once again playing in the Champions League.

In 2022, she was nominated for the Damallsvenskan's most valuable player.

In the summer of 2024, Persson moved to cross-city rivals Malmö FF. The team moved up to Damallsvenskan in October of that year, after defeating Örebro SK.

In June 2025, she was named OBOS Damallsvenskan Player of the Month.
