= Lysvik =

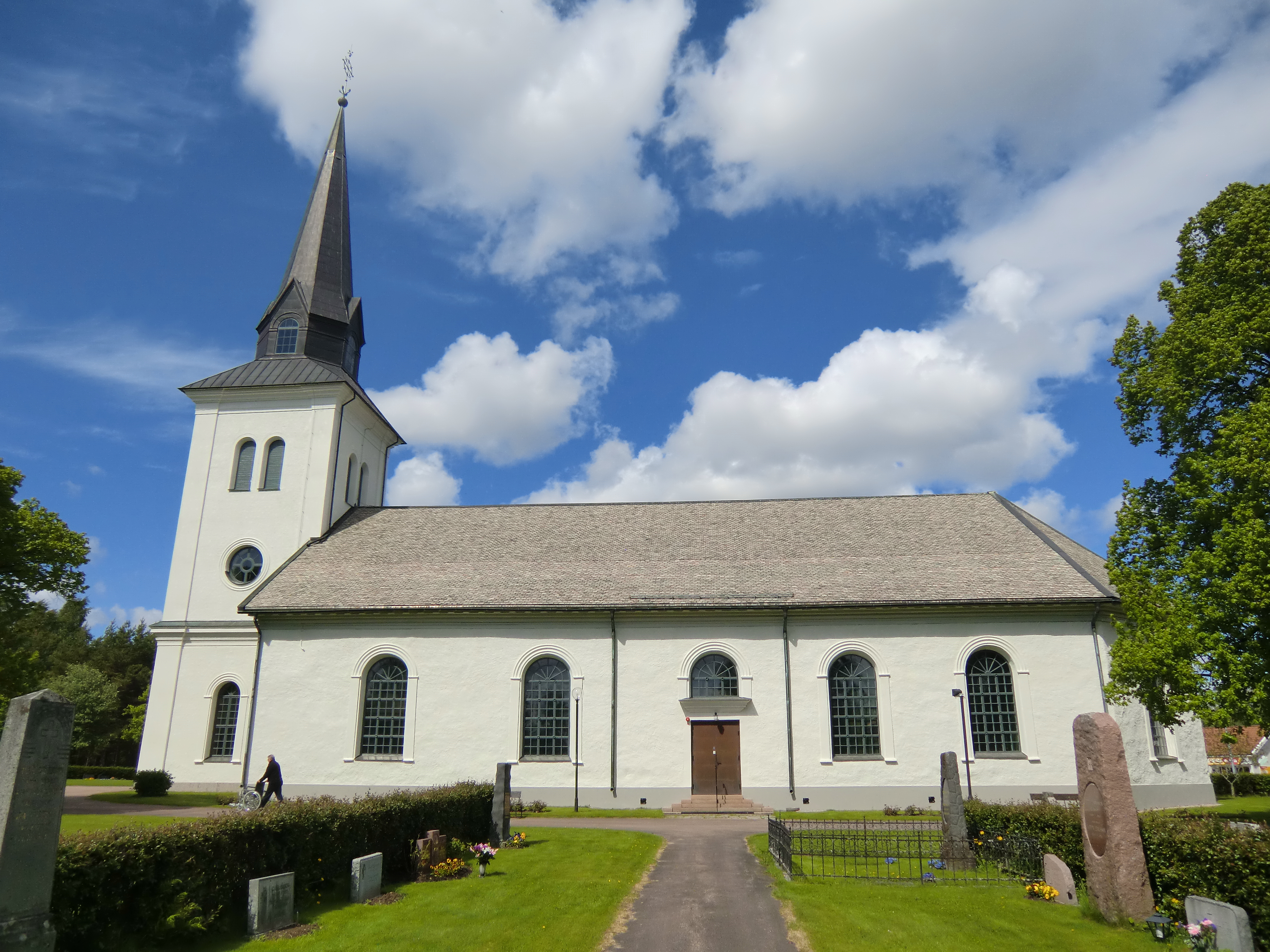
- Lysvik Church in late-May 2011

- Location within Sweden
- Coordinates: 60°01′N 13°08′E
- Country: Sweden
- Province: Värmland
- County: Värmland County
- Municipality: Sunne Municipality

Area
  - Total: 0.81 km^{2} (0.31 sq mi)

Population (31 December 2010)
  - Total: 341
  - Density: 421/km^{2} (1,090/sq mi)
- Time zone: UTC+1 (CET)
  - Summer (DST): UTC+2 (CEST)

Lysvik is a locality situated in Sunne Municipality, Värmland County, Sweden with 341 inhabitants in 2010.
