= Wilma Leidhammar =

Swedish footballer (born 2003)

Personal information
- Full name: Wilma Maria Leidhammar
- Date of birth: 16 June 2003 (age 23)
- Place of birth: Sweden
- Height: 1.77 m (5 ft 10 in)
- Positions: Midfielder; forward

Team information
- Current team: Birmingham City
- Number: 8

Senior career*
Years	Team	Apps	(Gls)
–2022	BK Astrio		
2022–2025	IFK Norrköping	87	(26)
2026-	Birmingham City	10	(5)

International career
2019	Sweden U17	9	(3)
2022	Sweden U19	3	(0)
2023-	Sweden U23	24	(5)
- * Club domestic league appearances and goals as of 26 April 2026

Wilma Maria Leidhammar (born 16 June 2003) is a Swedish professional footballer who plays as a midfielder or forward for Women's Super League club Birmingham City.

== Early life ==
Leidhammar was born on 16 June 2003. Born in Sweden, she started playing football at the age of four.

== Club career ==
Leidhammar started her career with Swedish side BK Astrio. Following her stint there, she signed for Swedish side IFK Norrköping in 2022, where she made eighty-seven league appearances and scored twenty-six goals and helped the club achieve promotion from the second tier to the top flight. Subsequently, she signed for English Birmingham City WFC. She scored in both halves of Birmingham's last game of the 2025-26 season as the club won promotion to the Women's Super League.

== International career ==
Leidhammar is a Sweden youth international. During the summer of 2022, she played for the Sweden women's national under-19 football team at the 2022 UEFA Women's Under-19 Championship.

== Style of play ==
Leidhammar plays as a midfielder or forward. English news website WSL Football wrote in 2026 that "comfortable as an attacking midfielder or in central areas, she is the kind of player who resists categorisation. She links play with ease, carries forward efficiently, and arrives in the final third with purpose".

== Honours ==
Birmingham City

- Women's Super League 2: 2025–26
