= Alingsås IF =

Swedish football club

- Full name: Alingsås Idrottsförening Fotboll
- Nickname: AIF
- Founded: 1906
- Ground: Mjörnvallen; Alingsås; Sweden
- Chairman: Joakim Bergman, Ordförande
- Sports Director: Robert Ranieli (women); Daniel Miglavs (men)
- League: Women: Elitettan (women); Division 4 (men)
Home colours	Away colours

Alingsås IF (Swedish: [ˈɑːlɪŋˌsoːs iːɛf]) is a Swedish football club located in Alingsås in Västra Götaland County.

By 2023, Alingsås IF FF had a women's team in Elitettan and a men's team in Division 4.

On 12 October 2024, the women's football team qualified for the Swedish top division.

== History ==
Alingsås Idrottsförening were formed in 1906 and are one of the oldest and most prestigious clubs in Alingsås. The club has almost 1,000 members of which 400 are active in football, 250 in athletics and 270 in gymnastics.

Since their foundation Alingsås IF has participated mainly in the middle divisions of the Swedish football league system. The club currently plays in Division 3 Mellersta Götaland which is the fifth tier of Swedish football. AIF have played six seasons in Division 2, which was then the second tier of Swedish football, in 1924/25, 1936/37, 1937/38, 1966, 1967 and 1968. They play their home matches at the Mjörnvallen in Alingsås. This facility is located next to the beach of the Lake Mjörn, and includes three 11-a-side pitches and a 5 a-side pitch.

Alingsås IF are affiliated to Västergötlands Fotbollförbund.

== Recent history ==
In recent seasons Alingsås IF have competed in the following divisions for women:

- 2018 - Division 1
- 2019 - Division 1
- 2020 - Elitettan
- 2021 - Elitettan
- 2022 - Elitettan
- 2023 - Elitettan
- 2024 - Elitettan
- 2025 - Damallsvenskan

In recent seasons Alingsås IF have competed in the following divisions for the men:

- 1993 – Division III, Mellersta Götaland

- 1994 – Division III, Mellersta Götaland
- 1995 – Division II, Västra Götaland
- 1996 – Division III, Nordvästra Götaland
- 1997 – Division IV, Västergötland Västra
- 1998 – Division IV, Västergötland Västra
- 1999 – Division V, Västra Älvsborg
- 2000 – Division V, Västra Älvsborg
- 2001 – Division IV, Västergötland Västra
- 2002 – Division IV, Västergötland Västra
- 2003 – Division IV, Västergötland Södra
- 2004 – Division IV, Västergötland Södra
- 2005 – Division IV, Västergötland Västra
- 2006 – Division IV, Västergötland Södra
- 2007 – Division III, Mellersta Götaland
- 2008 – Division IV, Västergötland Västra
- 2009 – Division IV, Västergötland Västra
- 2010 – Division IV, Västergötland Västra
- 2011 – Division III, Mellersta Götaland
- 2012 – Division III, Mellersta Götaland
- 2013 – Division III, Mellersta Götaland
- 2014 - No answer
- 2015 - No answer
- 2016 - No answer
- 2017 - Division 3
- 2018 - Division 4
- 2019 - Division 3
- 2020 - Division 3
- 2021 - Division 3
- 2022 - Division 3
- 2023 - Division 3

== Attendances ==
In recent seasons Alingsås IF have had the following average attendances:

Season	Average attendance	Division / Section	Level
2006	Not available	Div 4 Västergötland Södra	Tier 6
2007	188	Div 3 Mellersta Götaland	Tier 5
2008	Not available	Div 4 Västergötland Västra	Tier 6
2009	Not available	Div 4 Västergötland Västra	Tier 6
2010	139	Div 4 Västergötland Västra	Tier 6

* Attendances are provided in the attendance statistics of the Swedish Football Association's website.
