= IF Brommapojkarna (women) =

Swedish women's association football club

- Full name: Idrottsföreningen Brommapojkarna
- Founded: 1971; 55 years ago
- Ground: Grimsta IP, Stockholm
- Capacity: 6,820
- Sporting Director: Staffan Jacobsson
- Coach: Daniel Gunnars
- League: Damallsvenskan
- 2025: 12th
- Website: http://ifbp.se/dam/
| Home colours | Away colours |

Idrottsföreningen Brommapojkarna, (lit. 'the Bromma boys') more commonly known simply by its initials BP (Swedish: [ˈbeːˌpeː]), is a women's football club from Bromma, in Stockholm Municipality, Sweden. The team, a section of IF Brommapojkarna, was founded in 1971 and promoted to the second tier Elitettan in 2014. In November 2021, Brommapojkarna qualified for the 2022 Damallsvenskan, the Swedish top-flight, for the first time.

The club play their home games at Grimsta IP in Stockholm. The team colours are red and black. The club is affiliated to the Stockholms Fotbollförbund.

== Current squad ==
As of 6 January 2026.

Note: Flags indicate national team as defined under FIFA eligibility rules; some limited exceptions apply. Players may hold more than one non-FIFA nationality.

| No. | Pos. | Nation | Player |
|---|---|---|---|
| 1 | GK | FIN | Anna Koivunen |
| 2 | DF | SWE | Emma Theorén |
| 3 | DF | SWE | Julia Olsson |
| 4 | DF | SWE | Emilia Hjertberg |
| 5 | DF | SWE | Wilma Wärulf |
| 6 | MF | SWE | Fanny Hjelm |
| 7 | DF | SWE | Sara Olai |
| 8 | MF | SWE | Alice Ahlberg |
| 9 | FW | SWE | Line Wessman |
| 10 | FW | FIN | Adelina Engman |
| 11 | MF | SWE | Villemo Dahlqvist |
| 12 | MF | SWE | Tuva Ölvestad |

| No. | Pos. | Nation | Player |
|---|---|---|---|
| 13 | MF | SWE | Klara Andrup |
| 14 | FW | SWE | Frida Thörnqvist |
| 15 | DF | SWE | Elsa Karlsson (captain) |
| 16 | MF | SWE | Ellinor Johansson |
| 17 | MF | SWE | Augusta Priks |
| 18 | MF | SWE | Ida Bengtsson |
| 19 | MF | SWE | Vera Blom |
| 20 | GK | SWE | Alia Olsson Skinner |
| 21 | DF | SWE | Paula Broddner Klingspor |
| 22 | DF | SWE | Ebba Hjalmarsson |
| 23 | MF | SWE | Sirelle Maroutian |
| 23 | MF | SWE | Ellen Michelsson |
| 26 | GK | SWE | Hanna Skogfors |

=== Former players ===
For details of current and former players, see Category:IF Brommapojkarna (women) players.
