= Malmö FF (women) =

Swedish football club

- Full name: Malmö Fotbollförening
- Nicknames: Di blåe (Scanian: The Blue Ones); Himmelsblått (Sky Blue)
- Short name: MFF
- Founded: 7 September 1970; 56 years ago as Malmö FF Dam; 26 November 2019; 6 years ago as Malmö FF
- Ground: Malmö Stadion, Malmö
- Capacity: 26,500
- President: Anders Pålsson
- Head coach: Jonas Valfridsson
- League: Damallsvenskan
- 2025: 3rd of 14 (promoted)
- Website: www.mff.se
Home colours	Away colours	Third colours

Malmö Fotbollförening (Swedish: [ˈmâlːmøː ˈfûːtbɔlːfœˌreːnɪŋ]), commonly known as Malmö FF ([ˈmâlːmøː ɛfɛf]), Malmö, or MFF ([ɛmɛfɛf]), are a women's association football team from Malmö, who compete in the Damallsvenskan, the highest level of women's football in Sweden. Formed on 26 November 2019 and affiliated with the Scania Football Association, Malmö FF are based in Malmö, Scania.

== History ==
On 7 September 1970 the board of Malmö FF took the decision to start a women's team as part of the main club. The team was called Malmö FF Dam – the word dam meaning lady – to distinguish the team from the men's division of the same club. In 1986 the club won the Swedish Women's Football Division 1 for the first time. The Division 1 was Sweden's highest division until 1988 when the Damallsvenskan was formed. It took three seasons for the club to win the newly formed Damallsvenskan in 1990 and more success followed in 1991, 1993 and 1994. Malmö FF Dam would then finish as runners-up for seven consecutive seasons (from 1996 to 2002). In April 2007, Malmö FF Dam started a rebranding of the team, including a new team name, jerseys, and logo. The team was renamed LdB FC Malmö on 11 April 2007. This meant that the club fully withdrew from Malmö FF and became a club of its own. That club is now known as FC Rosengård.

On 26 November 2019, an extraordinary annual members meeting of Malmö FF voted in favour of reintroducing a women's section. A merger with IF Limhamn Bunkeflo was rejected and it was decided that the new club would apply for a place at the lowest level of women's football in Sweden, Division 4 Skåne Sydvästra, for the 2020 season. Subsequently, a head coach was hired and eighteen players were recruited, many of them from levels as high as Division 1, the third level of the league system.

== Rivalries ==
=== Malmö derby ===
The club's main rivals are FC Rosengård.

== Current squad ==
As of 9 September 2026

Note: Flags indicate national team as defined under FIFA eligibility rules; some limited exceptions apply. Players may hold more than one non-FIFA nationality.

No.	Pos.	Nation	Player
1	GK	SWE	Zećira Mušović
2	DF	SWE	Nathalie Hoff Persson
3	DF	AUS	Charli Grant
4	DF	SWE	Ellen Löfqvist
5	DF	SWE	Wilma Carlsson
6	MF	SWE	Nellie Lilja (captain)
7	MF	SWE	Stinalisa Johansson
8	MF	SWE	Mia Persson (vice-captain)
9	FW	ISL	Hlín Eiríksdóttir
10	FW	USA	Izzy D'Aquila
11	MF	SRB	Vesna Milivojević

No.	Pos.	Nation	Player
13	DF	SRB	Emma Petrovic
14	MF	SWE	Klara Åström
15	DF	SWE	Agnes Mårtensson
16	MF	SWE	Tuva Skoog
17	MF	DEN	Karoline Olesen
18	DF	AUS	Courtney Nevin
19	MF	USA	Larkin Russell
21	MF	AUS	Amy Sayer
25	MF	SWE	Mayar Khatawi
26	MF	SWE	Lovisa Breland
29	MF	SWE	Älvali Lindström
30	GK	SWE	Tilde Benilsson
31	GK	AUT	Kristin Krammer (on loan from Sturm Graz)

=== Out on loan ===
Note: Flags indicate national team as defined under FIFA eligibility rules; some limited exceptions apply. Players may hold more than one non-FIFA nationality.

No.	Pos.	Nation	Player
—	FW	SWE	Lilian Häggkvist (at Enskede IK until 31 December 2026)

== Management ==
=== Organisation ===
As of 8 December 2020

Name	Role
(Sweden) Zlatko Rihter	President
(Sweden) Jimmy Rosengren	Chief executive officer
(Sweden) Pontus Hansson	Secretary
(Sweden) Maxim Khalil	Sporting director
(Sweden) Anne-Maj Jansson	Sporting assistant

=== Technical staff ===
As of 13 March 2023

Name	Role
(Sweden) Jonas Valfridsson	Head coach
(Sweden) Daniel Angergård	Assistant coaches
(Sweden) Jeff Petersson	Assistant coaches
(Sweden) Anders Nilsson	Team Manager
(Sweden) Emelie Karlström	Goalkeeping coaches
(Sweden) Helena Ivarsson	Goalkeeping coaches
(Sweden) Jared Wallance	Fitness trainer
(Sweden) Filip Qvist	Physiotherapists
(Sweden) Karin Boman	Physiotherapists

== Honours ==
- Elitettan
  - Winners: 2024
- Division 1 Södra
  - Winners: 2023
- Division 2 Södra Götaland
  - Winners: 2022
- Division 3 Skåne Sydvästra
  - Winners: 2021
- Division 4 Skåne Sydvästra
  - Winners: 2020
