= IFK Norrköping (women) =

Swedish women's association football club

IFK Norrköping Dam
- Full name: Idrottsföreningen Kamraterna Norrköping
- Nickname: Peking (Beijing)
- Founded: 2009; 17 years ago
- Ground: PlatinumCars Arena, Norrköping
- Capacity: 17,234
- Chairman: Sakarias Mårdh
- Manager: Stellan Carlsson
- League: Damallsvenskan
- 2024: Damallsvenskan, 5th of 14
- Website: ifknorrkoping.se/damlaget
Home colours	Away colours	Third colours

Idrottsföreningen Kamraterna Norrköping (Swedish: [iːˌdrɔtsfœrˈeːnɪŋɛn kamˈrɑːtɛrna ˈnɔ̂rːˌɕøːpɪŋ]), more commonly known as IFK Norrköping ([iːɛfkoː ˈnɔ̂rːˌɕøːpɪŋ]) or simply Norrköping, is a women's football club from Norrköping, in Östergötland County, Sweden. The team, a section of IFK Norrköping, was founded in 2009 and gained promotion to the top tier Damallsvenskan for the first time in 2022.

The club play their home games at Nya Parken in Norrköping. The club colours, reflected in their crest and kit, are white and blue. The club is affiliated to the Östergötlands Fotbollförbund.

== History ==
IFK Norrköping had a women's team in the 1970s.

The current women's team was founded in 2009 from Lindö FF and Saltängens BK, with support from Åby IF, Eneby BK, and Smedby AIS. It entered Division 2. Tor-Arne Fredheim took over the club during the 2021 season, when the team resided in Elitettan. They were promoted to the top tier Damallsvenskan for the first time in 2022.

On 1 October 2024, it was presented that Piteå IF manager Stellan Carlsson would leave his club after 13 seasons to take over IFK Norrköping the upcoming season.

== Current squad ==
As of 2 January 2026

Note: Flags indicate national team as defined under FIFA eligibility rules; some limited exceptions apply. Players may hold more than one non-FIFA nationality.

No.	Pos.	Nation	Player
1	GK	SWE	Sofia Hjern
2	DF	SWE	Malva Larsson
4	DF	SWE	Ebba Handfast
7	DF	SWE	Elin Rombing
8	MF	WAL	Carrie Jones
9	FW	NED	Jada Conijnenberg
10	FW	SWE	Wilma Leidhammar
11	MF	SRB	Vesna Milivojević
13	DF	SWE	Maja Regnås Valčić
14	MF	SWE	Elsa Burvall
15	DF	SWE	Jessica Wik

No.	Pos.	Nation	Player
16	FW	SWE	Svea Rehnberg
17	FW	SWE	Alexandra Hellekant
18	DF	DEN	Frederikke Holmberg
19	FW	SWE	Sabina Ravnell
20	MF	FIN	Dana Leskinen
21	DF	SWE	Freja Lindwall
22	MF	SWE	Fanny Andersson
23	DF	CAN	Maya Antoine
24	FW	ISL	Sigdís Bárðardóttir
25	MF	SWE	Viktoria Veber
40	GK	USA	Caroline DeLisle

=== Out on loan ===
Note: Flags indicate national team as defined under FIFA eligibility rules; some limited exceptions apply. Players may hold more than one non-FIFA nationality.

No.	Pos.	Nation	Player
13	FW	SWE	Thilde Alvberger
18	FW	SWE	Stina Dahl Forslund

No.	Pos.	Nation	Player
30	GK	SWE	Tyra Berggården
—	DF	SWE	Selma Nyström

== Coaching history ==
Name	Period
(Sweden) Tor-Arne Fredheim	August 2021 – 2024
Stellan Carlsson	2025 –
