= 2026 Elitettan =

Swedish women's football second division, 2026 season

Elitettan
- Season: 2026
- Dates: 28 March – 14 November 2026
- Champions: Elfsborg
- Promoted: Elfsborg; Göteborg
- Relegated: Gamla Upsala; Sandviken; Häcken II
- Matches: 182
- Goals: 543 (2.98 per match)
- Top goalscorer: Cajsa Rubensson (16 goals)
- Best goalkeeper: Tilda Torstensson (16 clean sheets)
- Biggest home win: KIF Örebro 7–0 Sandviken; 3 October 2026
- Biggest away win: Sandviken 0–5 Göteborg; 10 May 2026; Enskede 0–5 Elfsborg; 15 August 2026
- Highest scoring: KIF Örebro 7–2 Jitex; 17 October 2026
- Longest winning run: 7 games KIF Örebro
- Longest unbeaten run: 17 games Göteborg
- Longest winless run: 14 games Häcken II
- Longest losing run: 10 games Häcken II
- Highest attendance: 3,519; Elfsborg 1–1 Göteborg; 22 May 2026
- Lowest attendance: 55; Häcken II 0–2 Umeå; 12 September 2026
- Total attendance: 54,687
- Average attendance: 300

The 2026 Elitettan is the 14th season of the Elitettan, the second division of women's football in Sweden. The season began on 28 March and will end on 14 November.

Eskilstuna United are the reigning champions, and were promoted to the Damallsvenskan alongside IK Uppsala in the previous season.

IF Elfsborg won their first title, which was confirmed on the final day after they defeated Husqvarna FF 1–0 at home. They were promoted alongside second-placed IFK Göteborg, who defeated Umeå IK by the same scoreline at home on the same day. Both Elfsborg and Göteborg, both of whom have men's teams in the Allsvenskan, were promoted for the first time in their history. KIF Örebro will play in the two-legged promotion/relegation playoff for the second season in a row, this year against 12th-placed Damallsvenskan side FC Rosengård, the most successful Damallsvenskan club in history who have never been relegated before.

BK Häcken II's relegation was confirmed following a 2–0 away defeat to Alingsås IF on 17 October, despite their senior team winning the Damallsvenskan. Sandvikens IF were later relegated on 1 November, after losing 5–1 away to Jitex BK. Gamla Upsala were the final team to be relegated, with their relegation being confirmed on the final day after they lost 2–1 away to Linköping FC, in turn allowing Alingsås to avoid a double relegation.

== Teams ==
Locations of teams in the 2026 Elitettan.

Team	Home city	Home ground	Capacity
Alingsås IF	Alingsås	Mjörnvallen	1,500
IF Elfsborg	Borås	Borås Arena	14,500
Enskede IK	Stockholm (Gamla Enskede)	Enskede IP	1,000
Gamla Upsala	Uppsala	Lötens IP	2,500
IFK Göteborg	Gothenburg	Valhalla IP	1,500
BK Häcken II	Gothenburg	Gothia Park Academy	
Husqvarna FF	Jönköping	Rosenlunds IP	2,000
Jitex BK	Mölndal	Åbyvallen	1,500
Linköping FC	Linköping	Linköping Arena	8,500
KIF Örebro	Örebro	Behrn Arena	12,624
Örebro SK	Örebro	Eyravallen	12,645
Sandvikens IF	Sandviken	Jernvallen	7,000
Trelleborgs FF	Trelleborg	Vångavallen	7,400
Umeå IK	Umeå	Umeå Energi Arena	6,000

=== Foreign players ===
While the Elitettan does not limit how many foreign players a club can have, it is uncommon for lower league clubs in Sweden to sign non-Swedish players. Below is a list of foreign players registered for the 2026 season, with their nationalities indicated by flags.

Foreign players by club
Club	Players
Alingsås	(Finland) Minni Laukka; (Austria) Isabella Svanström (Note: Born in Sweden, but representing another nation internationally)
Elfsborg	(Thailand) Matilda Mårtensson; (Kosovo) Valentina Metaj (Note: Played for Göteborg earlier in the season)
Gamla Upsala	(Finland) Anni Miettunen
Göteborg	(Netherlands) Anna Ursem
Häcken II	(Iceland) Eyrún Hjartardóttir
Husqvarna	(Norway) Amanda Norberg; (Serbia) Natalija Obradović
Jitex	(Bosnia and Herzegovina) Mia Karišik
KIF Örebro	(United States) Ella Frost; (United States) Rowan Lapi; (Poland) Julia Walentowicz
Linköping	(United States) Noelle Bond-Flasza; (Puerto Rico) Amber DiOrio (Note: Born in the Continental United States (CUS)); (Australia) Polly Doran; (Denmark) Sophia Ganzhorn; (Japan) Miu Kitamura; (United States) Ashlynn Serepca
Sandviken	(Finland) Veera Hullman; (Finland) Matilda Kuusiniemi-Fishwick; (Nigeria) Florence Onyinye Okoli; (United States) Natalie Viggiano
Trelleborg	(Finland) Heidi Kollanen; (Peru) Andrea Thorisson

Summary by country
Rank	Country	Players
1	Finland	5
1	United States	5
8	Australia	1
8	Austria	1
8	Bosnia and Herzegovina	1
8	Denmark	1
8	Iceland	1
8	Japan	1
8	Netherlands	1
8	Norway	1
8	Kosovo	1
8	Nigeria	1
8	Peru	1
8	Poland	1
8	Puerto Rico	1
8	Serbia	1
8	Thailand	1

== League table ==
Pos	Team	Pld	W	D	L	GF	GA	GD	Pts	Promotion or relegation
1	IF Elfsborg (C, P)	26	18	7	1	49	13	+36	61	Promotion to the Damallsvenskan
2	IFK Göteborg (P)	26	18	6	2	67	27	+40	60	Promotion to the Damallsvenskan
3	KIF Örebro	26	19	2	5	66	30	+36	59	Qualification for the promotion playoffs
4	Umeå IK	26	14	5	7	45	25	+20	47	
5	Linköping FC	26	14	4	8	43	38	+5	46	
6	Trelleborgs FF	26	10	7	9	36	41	−5	37	
7	Husqvarna FF	26	9	7	10	33	36	−3	34	
8	Jitex BK	26	8	8	10	38	42	−4	32	
9	Enskede IK	26	9	5	12	36	44	−8	32	
10	Örebro SK	26	7	6	13	28	45	−17	27	
11	Alingsås IF	26	6	8	12	23	32	−9	26	
12	Gamla Upsala (R)	26	6	5	15	30	43	−13	23	Relegation to Division 1
13	Sandvikens IF (R)	26	3	5	18	25	70	−45	14	Relegation to Division 1
14	BK Häcken II (Note: BK Häcken II are the reserve team of BK Häcken and are therefore ineligible for promotion.) (R)	26	2	3	21	25	58	−33	9	Relegation to Division 1

Source: Swedish Football Association (in Swedish)
Rules for classification: 1) Points; 2) Goal difference; 3) Number of goals scored; 4) Head-to-head points; 5) Head-to-head goal difference; 6) Head-to-head away goals scored
(C) Champions; (P) Promoted; (R) Relegated

=== Positions by round ===
Team ╲ Round	1	2	3	4	5	6	7	8	9	10	11	12	13	14	15	16	17	18	19	20	21	22	23	24	25	26
Elfsborg	2	1	1	1	1	1	1	1	1	2	1	1	1	1	3	2	3	2	1	1	1	1	1	1	1	1
Göteborg	8	7	7	5	4	4	3	3	3	3	4	4	3	3	2	1	1	1	3	3	3	3	3	2	2	2
KIF Örebro	13	10	6	4	7	5	5	4	4	4	3	2	4	4	4	3	4	4	4	2	2	2	2	3	3	3
Umeå	1	4	2	2	2	2	4	5	6	7	7	8	7	6	5	5	5	5	5	5	5	5	5	4	4	4
Linköping	4	2	3	3	3	3	2	2	2	1	2	3	2	2	1	4	2	3	2	4	4	4	4	5	5	5
Trelleborg	3	3	4	7	6	7	6	6	5	5	5	5	5	5	6	6	6	6	6	6	6	6	7	6	6	6
Husqvarna	6	6	8	8	9	8	10	10	8	9	9	10	10	10	7	7	7	7	7	7	7	7	6	7	7	7
Jitex	14	8	10	9	10	11	9	9	10	10	10	9	9	9	10	10	10	8	8	8	8	8	8	8	8	8
Enskede	10	12	11	10	8	9	7	8	7	6	6	6	6	7	8	8	9	10	11	11	10	10	10	9	9	9
Örebro SK	7	9	5	6	5	6	8	7	9	8	8	7	8	8	9	9	8	9	9	9	9	9	9	10	10	10
Alingsås	9	13	12	12	12	12	11	11	11	12	12	11	11	11	11	11	11	11	10	10	11	11	11	12	12	11
Gamla Upsala	5	5	9	11	11	10	12	12	12	11	11	12	12	12	12	12	12	12	12	12	12	12	12	11	11	12
Sandviken	11	11	13	13	13	13	13	13	13	13	13	13	13	13	13	13	13	13	13	13	13	13	13	13	13	13
Häcken II	12	14	14	14	14	14	14	14	14	14	14	14	14	14	14	14	14	14	14	14	14	14	14	14	14	14

Leader and promotion to the Damallsvenskan
Promotion to the Damallsvenskan
Qualification for the promotion playoffs
Relegation to Division 1

Source: Swedish Football Association (in Swedish)

== Results ==
Home \ Away	ALI	ELF	ENS	GAM	GÖT	HÄC	HUS	JIT	KÖR	LIN	ÖRS	SAN	TRE	UME
Alingsås IF	—	0–1	1–1	0–0	1–1	2–0	0–1	0–3	0–2	1–2	1–1	3–0	0–1	2–0
IF Elfsborg	0–0	—	3–0	2–0	1–1	2–1	1–0	1–0	0–2	0–0	2–0	1–0	0–0	4–1
Enskede IK	0–1	0–5	—	4–1	0–2	1–1	1–1	2–2	1–2	1–2	2–1	4–0	3–1	1–1
Gamla Upsala	1–1	0–2	1–2	—	2–4	3–0	2–2	0–1	1–2	0–2	1–1	1–3	0–1	2–3
IFK Göteborg	2–1	1–1	2–0	2–1	—	2–1	2–1	1–1	3–0	2–3	2–1	6–0	3–1	1–0
BK Häcken II	0–1	0–1	2–0	1–2	1–4	—	1–2	2–2	1–3	1–2	2–3	3–4	2–4	0–2
Husqvarna FF	2–1	1–1	0–1	1–0	4–4	1–1	—	0–0	2–1	1–3	0–1	3–1	1–0	1–2
Jitex BK	1–2	0–1	1–2	1–2	0–3	1–0	1–1	—	0–1	2–1	3–2	5–1	4–1	0–4
KIF Örebro	2–0	0–3	4–3	0–2	5–1	3–0	2–1	7–2	—	4–0	1–0	7–0	2–1	2–1
Linköping FC	4–0	2–3	2–1	2–1	1–4	3–0	2–1	1–1	3–2	—	2–4	1–0	0–2	0–0
Örebro SK	2–2	0–3	2–1	0–1	0–4	2–1	0–2	1–4	0–3	2–0	—	1–1	0–0	1–0
Sandvikens IF	3–3	0–4	0–1	1–2	0–5	2–3	3–4	0–0	1–5	3–2	1–1	—	0–0	1–2
Trelleborgs FF	1–0	2–4	1–3	4–4	0–4	2–0	3–0	3–3	2–2	1–1	2–1	1–0	—	0–4
Umeå IK	1–0	1–1	5–1	1–0	1–1	4–1	2–0	2–0	2–2	1–2	3–0	2–0	0–2	—

Source: SvenskFotboll.se
Legend: Blue = home team win; Yellow = draw; Red = away team win.

=== Results by round ===
Team ╲ Round	1	2	3	4	5	6	7	8	9	10	11	12	13	14	15	16	17	18	19	20	21	22	23	24	25	26
Alingsås	L	L	D	W	L	L	W	L	D	L	D	D	D	L	W	D	L	W	D	L	L	W	L	D	L	W
Elfsborg	W	W	W	D	W	W	W	W	D	D	W	D	W	W	L	W	D	W	W	D	W	W	W	D	W	W
Enskede	L	L	W	D	W	L	W	L	W	W	D	D	L	L	L	D	L	L	L	L	W	W	L	D	W	W
Gamla Upsala	W	D	L	L	L	L	L	D	D	W	L	L	D	L	L	L	W	W	D	L	L	L	W	W	L	L
Göteborg	L	W	D	W	W	W	W	W	D	W	D	D	W	W	W	W	W	D	L	D	W	L	W	W	W	W
Häcken II	L	L	L	L	L	L	L	L	L	L	D	L	L	L	W	L	W	L	L	D	L	L	L	L	D	L
Husqvarna	W	D	L	D	L	W	L	L	W	D	D	L	L	W	W	W	L	W	L	W	L	W	D	D	D	L
Jitex	L	W	D	D	L	W	L	D	L	L	W	W	W	L	L	D	L	D	W	D	W	L	D	W	L	
KIF Örebro	L	D	W	W	L	W	W	W	W	W	W	W	L	W	W	W	D	L	W	W	W	W	W	L	W	W
Linköping	W	W	D	D	W	W	W	W	W	W	D	L	W	W	W	L	W	L	W	L	L	D	L	L	L	W
Örebro SK	W	L	W	D	W	L	L	D	L	W	L	W	D	L	L	D	D	L	L	W	W	L	L	L	D	L
Sandviken	L	L	L	D	L	L	L	D	L	L	D	W	L	L	L	W	D	D	L	L	L	L	W	L	L	L
Trelleborg	W	W	L	L	W	L	W	W	W	L	D	D	D	W	L	L	D	D	W	W	L	L	L	W	D	
Umeå	W	D	W	D	W	W	L	L	L	L	L	D	W	W	W	L	D	W	W	W	W	D	W	W	W	L

Source: Swedish Football Association (in Swedish)
W = Win; D = Draw; L = Loss; P = Postponed

== Promotion playoffs ==
Team 1	Agg.	Team 2	1st leg	2nd leg
Rosengård	TBD	KIF Örebro	TBD	TBD

19 November 2026
18:00 CEST

KIF Örebro	v	Rosengård

Eyravallen, Örebro

22 November 2026
15:00 CEST

Rosengård	v	KIF Örebro

Malmö IP, Malmö

== Season statistics ==
=== Top scorers ===
Rank	Player	Club	Goals
1	(Sweden) Cajsa Rubensson	KIF Örebro	16
2	(Sweden) Linnéa Westbom	Umeå	15
3	(Sweden) Stina Jensen	Elfsborg	13
3	(Sweden) Ronja Lind	Husqvarna	13
5	(Sweden) Olivia Alcaide	Jitex	12
5	(Sweden) Helene Gross-Benberg	KIF Örebro	12
5	(Sweden) Lisa Johansson	Göteborg	12
8	(Sweden) Louise Matsgård	Gamla Upsala	11
9	(United States) Rowan Lapi	KIF Örebro	10
9	(Sweden) Moa Öhman	Göteborg	10
11	(Sweden) Tindra Ivarsson Lidström	Jitex	9
11	(Sweden) Hanna Persson	Trelleborg	9
11	(United States) Ashlynn Serepca	Linköping	9

==== Hat-tricks ====
Player	For	Against	Result	Date
(Sweden) Olivia Alcaide	Jitex	Örebro	3–2 (H)	25 July 2026
(Sweden) Cajsa Rubensson	KIF Örebro	Göteborg	5–1 (H)	19 September 2026
(Sweden) Cajsa Rubensson (Note: Scored four goals)	KIF Örebro	Sandviken	7–0 (H)	3 October 2026
(Sweden) Helene Gross-Benberg	KIF Örebro	Jitex	7–2 (H)	17 October 2026

=== Clean sheets ===
Rank	Player	Club	Clean sheets
1	(Sweden) Tilda Torstensson	Elfsborg	16
2	(Sweden) Elvira Björklund	Umeå	10
3	(Sweden) Julia Langörgen	KIF Örebro	9
4	(Sweden) Mimmi Carlsbogård	Göteborg	7
5	(Sweden) Sarah Melén	Alingsås	6
5	(Sweden) Clara Wiklund	Trelleborg	6
8	(Sweden) Emilie Borg	Jitex	5
8	(Sweden) Julia Cavander	Linköping	5
8	(Sweden) Wilma Delerud	Trelleborg	5
8	(Sweden) Wilma Edman	Husqvarna	5

=== Discipline ===
==== Player ====
- Most yellow cards: 5
  - (Sweden) Ebba Cabander (Örebro)
  - (Sweden) Hanna Gunnarson (Elfsborg)
  - (Sweden) Stina Jensen (Elfsborg)
- Most red cards: 1
  - (Sweden) Amelia Aurelius (Häcken II)
  - (Sweden) Lovisa Falkenteg (Linköping)
  - (Sweden) Stina Jensen (Elfsborg)
  - (Sweden) Stella Johansson (Jitex)
  - (Sweden) Sarah Melén (Alingsås)
  - (Finland) Anni Miettunen (Gamla Upsala)
  - (Sweden) Alma Öberg (Alingsås)
  - (Sweden) Anna Svanberg (Häcken II)
  - (Sweden) Tilda Sörlén (Umeå)

==== Club ====
- Most yellow cards: 29
  - Elfsborg
- Most red cards: 2
  - Alingsås
- Fewest yellow cards: 9
  - Umeå
- Fewest red cards: 0
  - Enskede
  - Gamla Upsala
  - Göteborg
  - Häcken II
  - Husqvarna
  - KIF Örebro
  - Örebro
  - Sandviken
  - Trelleborg

== Awards ==
=== Monthly awards ===
Month	Player of the Month		Other nominated players			
Month	Player	Club	Player	Club	Player	Club
April	(United States) Cassandra Larsson	Umeå	(Sweden) Jonna Andersson	Linköping	(Sweden) Izabella Bergström	Elfsborg
May	(Sweden) Hanna Persson	Trelleborg	(Sweden) Helene Gross-Benberg	KIF Örebro	(Sweden) Tilda Torstensson	Elfsborg
June	(United States) Noelle Bond-Flasza	Linköping	(Sweden) Tilda Glemdal Bergkvist	Husqvarna	(Sweden) Moa Öhman	Göteborg
July	Summer break					
August	(Sweden) Lisa Johansson	Göteborg	(Sweden) Helene Gross-Benberg	KIF Örebro	(Sweden) Lovisa Brogren	Göteborg
September	(Sweden) Ronja Lind	Husqvarna	(Sweden) Cajsa Rubensson	KIF Örebro	(Sweden) Linnéa Westbom	Umeå
October	(Sweden) Cajsa Rubensson	KIF Örebro	(Sweden) Lilian Häggkvist	Enskede	(Sweden) Tove Lorén	Elfsborg
November						
