= 2026 Damallsvenskan =

Swedish women's football top division, 2026 season

Damallsvenskan
- Season: 2026
- Dates: 28 March – 15 November 2026
- Champions: Häcken (3rd title)
- Relegated: Rosengård; Växjö; Uppsala
- Champions League: Häcken; Hammarby; Malmö
- Matches: 182
- Goals: 542 (2.98 per match)
- Top goalscorer: Maja Bodin (16 goals)
- Best goalkeeper: Zećira Mušović (12 clean sheets)
- Biggest home win: Häcken 9–0 Uppsala; 4 October 2026
- Biggest away win: Uppsala 0–7 Hammarby; 1 November 2026
- Highest scoring: AIK 8–2 Uppsala; 7 November 2026
- Longest winning run: 13 games Häcken
- Longest unbeaten run: 23 games Häcken
- Longest winless run: 21 games Uppsala
- Longest losing run: 18 games Uppsala
- Highest attendance: 8,003; Malmö 1–0 Rosengård; 4 October 2026
- Lowest attendance: 64; Uppsala 0–5 Kristianstad; 17 October 2026
- Total attendance: 139,672
- Average attendance: 767

The 2026 Damallsvenskan, known as the 2026 OBOS Damallsvenskan for sponsorship reasons, is the 39th and current season of the Damallsvenskan, the top division of women's football in Sweden.

BK Häcken are the reigning champions, having won their second ever title in the previous season. They successfully retained their title, being confirmed champions on 2 November following a 4–1 victory at home over Kristianstads DFF. Häcken qualified for the UEFA Women's Champions League (UWCL) qualifying rounds, alongside second-placed Hammarby IF and third-placed Malmö FF, with the same three teams qualifying in the same order as last season.

IK Uppsala were relegated to the Elitettan on 17 October following their 5–0 defeat at home to Kristianstads DFF in front of a crowd of just 64 fans, one of the lowest attendances in the league's history (in what was an otherwise well-attended season). Their relegation came after it was announced the day before that club would be folding at the end of the season, and the club filed for bankruptcy after the team played their final match. Växjö DFF were also relegated after three consecutive seasons in the top flight, following their 1–0 defeat at home to IFK Norrköping on 8 November.

After what was their worst season on record, FC Rosengård, the most successful club in the league's history, were relegated for the first time ever after losing 5–4 on aggregate in the promotion/relegation playoff against third-placed Elitettan team KIF Örebro, who narrowly missed out on automatic promotion to IF Elfsborg and IFK Göteborg. This was the first time an Elitettan team defeated a Damallsvenskan team in the promotion/relegation playoff since the playoffs were introduced in 2022. However, it is unclear whether KIF Örebro will be promoted, as they filed for bankruptcy at the end of the season.

== Teams ==
Location of teams in the 2026 Damallsvenskan
Location of teams in the 2026 Damallsvenskan in Stockholm Municipality

Team	Location	Stadium	Stadium capacity (Note: According to each club information page previously available at the Swedish Football Association website for Damallsvenskan, unless otherwise noted. Numbers are usually lower than official stadium numbers.)
AIK	Stockholm (Solna)	Skytteholms IP	5,200
BK Häcken	Gothenburg (Brämaregården)	Bravida Arena	6,500
Djurgårdens IF	Stockholm (Villastaden)	Stockholm Olympic Stadium	14,417
Eskilstuna United	Eskilstuna	Tunavallen	7,800
FC Rosengård	Malmö (Kronborg)	Malmö IP	5,700
Hammarby IF	Stockholm (Skanstull)	Hammarby IP	3,700
Hammarby IF	Stockholm (Johanneshov)	3Arena	30,000
IF Brommapojkarna	Stockholm (Vällingby)	Grimsta IP	5,000
IF Brommapojkarna	Stockholm (Kristineberg)	Kristinebergs IP	1,500
IFK Norrköping	Norrköping	PlatinumCars Arena	17,234
IK Uppsala	Uppsala (Kungsängen)	Studenternas IP	10,522
Kristianstads DFF	Kristianstad	Kristianstads Fotbollsarena	3,080 (Note: According to the history page on Kristianstad's website.)
Malmö FF	Malmö (Stadionområdet)	Eleda Stadion	26,500
Malmö FF	Malmö (Stadionområdet)	Malmö Stadion	22,500
Piteå IF	Piteå	LF Arena	6,500
Piteå IF	Luleå	JIABvallen	1,503
Växjö DFF	Växjö	Visma Arena	12,000
Vittsjö GIK	Vittsjö	Vittsjö IP	3,000

=== Personnel and kits ===
Team	Manager	Captain	Kit manufacturer
AIK	(Sweden) Lukas Syberyjski	(Sweden) Jennie Nordin	(United States) Nike
Brommapojkarna	(Sweden) Daniel Gunnars	(Sweden) Elsa Karlsson	(United States) Nike
Djurgården	(Sweden) Marcelo Fernández		(Germany) Puma
Eskilstuna United	(Sweden) Rickard Johansson		(United States) Nike
Häcken	(Sweden) Elena Sadiku	(Sweden) Jennifer Falk	(Germany) Puma
Hammarby	(Sweden) William Strömberg	(Sweden) Alice Carlsson	(Sweden) Craft
Kristianstad	(England) Nik Chamberlain	(Sweden) Alice Nilsson	
Malmö	(Sweden) Jonas Valfridsson	(Sweden) Elin Björklund	(Germany) Puma
Norrköping	(Sweden) Stellan Carlsson		
Piteå	(Sweden) Fredrik Bernhardsson	(Sweden) Cecilia Edlund	
Rosengård	(Sweden) Qvarmans Möller		
Uppsala	(Sweden) Hanna Spets		(Sweden) Craft
Växjo	(Sweden) Olof Unogård	(Sweden) Emma Pennsäter	
Vittsjö	(Serbia) Mladen Blagojević	(Sweden) Sandra Lynn	

=== Managerial changes ===
Team	Outgoing manager	Manner of departure	Date of vacancy	Position in table	Incoming manager	Date of appointment
Hammarby	(Sweden) Martin Sjögren	Signed by Chicago Stars	16 November 2025	Pre-season	(Sweden) William Strömberg	6 November 2025
Kristianstad	(Sweden) Daniel Angergård	Resigned	16 November 2025	Pre-season	(England) Nik Chamberlain	16 November 2025
Häcken	(Lebanon) Mak Lind	Resigned	4 December 2025	Pre-season	(Sweden) Elena Sadiku	23 December 2025

== League table ==
Pos	Team	Pld	W	D	L	GF	GA	GD	Pts	Qualification or relegation
1	BK Häcken (C)	26	23	2	1	82	16	+66	71	Qualification for the Champions League second qualifying round
2	Hammarby IF	26	21	2	3	64	13	+51	65	Qualification for the Champions League second qualifying round
3	Malmö FF	26	13	9	4	48	20	+28	48	Qualification for the Champions League second qualifying round
4	AIK	26	13	5	8	48	37	+11	44	
5	Kristianstads DFF	26	11	5	10	44	40	+4	38	
6	Vittsjö GIK	26	10	6	10	35	37	−2	36	
7	IF Brommapojkarna	26	11	2	13	39	49	−10	35	
8	Djurgårdens IF	26	10	4	12	34	40	−6	34	
9	Eskilstuna United	26	10	3	13	23	33	−10	33	
10	Piteå IF	26	7	7	12	29	37	−8	28	
11	IFK Norrköping	26	6	10	10	28	39	−11	28	
12	FC Rosengård (R)	26	6	6	14	24	33	−9	24	Qualification for the relegation playoffs
13	Växjö DFF (R)	26	6	4	16	29	48	−19	22	Relegation to the Elitettan
14	IK Uppsala	26	1	3	22	16	101	−85	6	Dissolved after the season

Source: Swedish Football Association (in Swedish)
Rules for classification: 1) Points; 2) Goal difference; 3) Number of goals scored; 4) Head-to-head points; 5) Head-to-head goal difference; 6) Head-to-head away goals scored
(C) Champions; (R) Relegated

=== Positions by round ===
Team ╲ Round	1	2	3	4	5	6	7	8	9	10	11	12	13	14	15	16	17	18	19	20	21	22	23	24	25	26
Häcken	3	3	4	3	2	2	2	2	1	2	1	2	1	1	1	1	1	1	1	1	1	1	1	1	1	1
Hammarby	2	1	3	2	1	1	1	1	2	1	2	1	2	2	2	2	2	2	2	2	2	2	2	2	2	2
Malmö	1	5	2	1	3	5	4	4	4	3	3	3	4	3	3	3	3	3	3	3	3	3	3	3	3	3
AIK	7	4	5	6	7	6	6	3	3	4	4	4	3	4	4	6	7	5	4	4	4	5	4	4	4	4
Kristianstad	4	2	1	4	4	4	5	7	7	6	6	6	7	6	6	5	6	4	5	5	5	4	5	5	5	5
Vittsjö	11	12	13	10	12	9	8	8	9	8	8	5	6	7	7	7	5	7	7	6	6	6	6	7	6	6
Brommapojkarna	9	14	14	11	13	13	11	9	8	9	9	9	9	9	10	11	9	8	8	7	7	7	7	8	8	7
Djurgården	6	7	7	8	10	12	9	10	10	12	13	13	12	11	11	9	10	10	10	10	10	8	10	9	9	8
Eskilstuna United	5	8	9	7	6	3	3	6	5	5	5	7	5	5	5	4	4	6	6	8	8	9	8	6	7	9
Piteå	8	9	6	5	5	7	7	5	6	7	7	8	8	8	8	8	8	9	9	9	9	10	9	10	10	10
Norrköping	12	10	10	12	11	8	10	11	12	11	12	10	11	12	12	12	13	13	13	13	13	12	12	12	11	11
Rosengård	13	13	12	14	14	14	12	13	13	13	11	12	13	13	13	13	12	11	12	11	11	11	11	11	12	12
Växjö	10	6	8	9	9	11	14	14	11	10	10	11	11	10	9	10	11	12	11	12	12	13	13	13	13	13
Uppsala	14	11	11	13	8	10	13	12	14	14	14	14	14	14	14	14	14	14	14	14	14	14	14	14	14	14

Leader and 2026–27 UEFA Champions League first round
2026–27 UEFA Champions League first round
Relegation play-off
Relegation to the Elitettan

Source: Swedish Football Association (in Swedish)

== Results ==
Home \ Away	AIK	BRO	DJU	ESK	HÄC	HAM	KRI	MAL	NOR	PIT	ROS	UPS	VÄX	VIT
AIK	—	1–0	3–0	1–0	2–1	2–1	0–1	2–2	1–0	2–1	2–0	8–2	3–0	1–2
Brommapojkarna	2–5	—	2–1	0–1	0–6	0–3	3–2	3–1	2–0	1–1	2–0	4–2	2–1	1–2
Djurgården	2–1	2–2	—	0–0	1–1	0–2	0–2	0–1	1–1	3–2	0–1	8–0	2–1	2–0
Eskilstuna United	1–1	2–1	0–1	—	0–3	0–1	1–0	1–1	1–2	2–0	0–3	1–0	1–2	2–1
Häcken	4–1	3–2	3–0	6–0	—	3–0	4–1	1–1	2–0	2–0	2–0	9–0	4–2	4–0
Hammarby	4–1	2–0	3–0	3–0	0–1	—	1–0	2–1	2–0	5–0	3–1	3–0	5–0	3–1
Kristianstad	3–0	0–2	4–1	2–1	0–3	0–1	—	1–2	2–2	2–2	1–1	3–2	1–0	1–3
Malmö	3–2	2–0	3–0	1–0	1–2	1–1	6–0	—	1–1	0–0	1–0	3–0	3–0	1–1
Norrköping	1–1	3–0	0–1	0–2	0–6	0–4	0–5	1–1	—	1–2	2–1	5–0	0–0	1–1
Piteå	0–1	1–2	0–1	0–1	1–4	1–1	2–3	1–1	1–1	—	2–1	5–1	2–0	1–0
Rosengård	1–2	1–2	4–1	0–1	0–1	0–2	2–2	0–1	1–1	1–0	—	1–0	1–1	2–0
Uppsala	2–2	0–1	1–4	0–6	2–3	0–7	0–5	0–6	0–4	0–0	1–1	—	0–3	3–0
Växjö	3–3	2–1	2–3	3–0	1–2	0–3	0–2	0–4	0–1	1–2	2–0	4–0	—	0–2
Vittsjö	1–0	5–4	1–0	2–0	1–2	1–2	1–1	1–0	1–1	0–2	1–1	5–0	2–2	—

Source: Swedish Football Association (in Swedish)
Legend: Blue = home team win; Yellow = draw; Red = away team win.
For upcoming matches, an "a" indicates there is an article about the rivalry between the two participants.

=== Results by round ===
Team ╲ Round	1	2	3	4	5	6	7	8	9	10	11	12	13	14	15	16	17	18	19	20	21	22	23	24	25	26
AIK	W	W	W	L	D	W	D	D	W	L	W	L	W	L	L	L	D	W	W	W	L	L	W	W	W	D
Brommapojkarna	L	L	L	W	L	L	W	W	W	L	L	W	L	L	D	D	W	W	W	W	L	W	L	L	L	W
Djurgården	W	L	D	L	L	L	W	D	L	L	L	L	W	W	D	W	L	L	L	W	W	W	L	W	D	W
Eskilstuna United	W	L	L	W	W	W	L	D	D	W	L	L	W	W	L	W	D	L	L	L	L	L	W	W	L	L
Häcken	W	W	L	W	W	W	W	W	W	W	W	W	W	W	W	W	D	W	W	W	W	W	W	W	D	W
Hammarby	W	W	W	W	W	W	W	W	L	W	D	W	W	W	D	W	W	W	L	W	W	L	W	W	W	W
Kristianstad	W	W	W	L	D	D	L	L	D	W	L	W	L	W	D	W	L	W	D	L	W	W	L	L	W	L
Malmö	W	D	W	W	L	L	D	W	D	W	W	D	L	W	D	W	D	W	W	L	W	W	W	D	D	D
Norrköping	L	D	D	L	D	W	L	L	D	D	D	W	L	L	D	L	L	L	W	L	D	W	W	D	W	D
Piteå	L	D	W	W	W	L	L	W	L	L	D	D	L	L	W	D	W	L	D	L	D	L	W	L	D	L
Rosengård	L	L	D	L	L	D	W	L	D	L	W	D	L	L	D	L	W	W	L	W	L	W	L	D	L	L
Uppsala	L	D	D	L	W	L	L	D	L	L	L	L	L	L	L	L	L	L	L	L	L	L	L	L	L	L
Växjö	L	W	L	L	D	L	L	L	W	D	W	L	W	L	W	L	L	L	D	L	L	L	L	D	L	W
Vittsjö	L	L	L	W	L	W	W	L	D	W	D	D	W	W	D	L	W	L	D	W	W	L	L	L	W	D

Source: Swedish Football Association (in Swedish)
W = Win; D = Draw; L = Loss; P = Postponed

== Relegation playoffs ==
Team 1	Agg.	Team 2	1st leg	2nd leg
Rosengård	4–5	KIF Örebro	1–2	3–3

=== First leg ===
19 November 2026
18:00 CEST

KIF Örebro	2–1	Rosengård
Gross-Benberg 11'; Rubensson 47'	Report	Gomez 79'

Eyravallen, Örebro
Attendance: 412
Referee: Lovisa Johansson

=== Second leg ===
22 November 2026
15:00 CEST

Rosengård	3–3	KIF Örebro
Gomez 7'; Siemsen 78'; Malmros 90+7'	Report	Selling 39'; Lapi 45+1'; Eriksen Yasseri 69'

Malmö IP, Malmö
Attendance: 601
Referee: Amanda Nylund Karman

KIF Örebro won 5–4 on aggregate.

== Season statistics ==
Players in italics left during the season

=== Top scorers ===
Rank	Player	Club	Goals
1	(Sweden) Maja Bodin	Växjö; Häcken	16
2	(United States) Tabby Tindell	Häcken	15
3	(Sweden) Frida Thörnqvist	Brommapojkarna	11
4	(Sweden) Emma Engström	Norrköping	10
4	(Sweden) Älvali Lindström	Uppsala; Malmö	10
6	(Sweden) Anna Anvegård	Häcken	9
7	(United States) Izzy D'Aquila	Malmö	8
7	(Sweden) Daniella Famili	AIK	8
7	(Australia) Daniela Galić	Vittsjö	8
7	(Iceland) Ásdís Halldórsdóttir	AIK	8
7	(Sweden) Alexandra Hellekant	Piteå	8
7	(Norway) Elin Sørum	Hammarby	8
7	(Japan) Urara Watanabe	Djurgården	8

==== Hat tricks ====
Player	For	Against	Result	Date
(Sweden) Hanna Ekengren	Kristianstad	Uppsala	3–2 (H)	18 June 2026
(Norway) Sara Kanutte	Malmö	Kristianstad	6–0 (H)	27 June 2026
(Sweden) Emma Engström	Norrköping	Uppsala	4–0 (A)	1 August 2026
(Sweden) Maja Bodin	Häcken	Brommapojkarna	6–0 (A)	15 August 2026
(Iceland) Hlín Eiríksdóttir	Malmö	Växjö	4–0 (A)	29 August 2026
(United States) Tabby Tindell	Häcken	Uppsala	9–0 (H)	4 October 2026
(Sweden) Mathilde Janzen	Hammarby	Uppsala	7–0 (A)	1 November 2026
(Iceland) Ásdís Halldórsdóttir	AIK	Uppsala	8–2 (H)	7 November 2026

=== Clean sheets ===
Rank	Player	Club	Clean sheets
1	(Sweden) Zećira Mušović	Malmö	12
2	(Sweden) Cajsa Andersson	Hammarby	9
2	(Sweden) Jennifer Falk	Häcken	9
4	(United States) Monica Wilhelm	Eskilstuna United	8
5	(Sweden) Moa Olsson	Kristianstad	8
6	(Finland) Emilia Dannbäck	AIK	7
6	(Sweden) Elin Vaughan	Vittsjö	7
8	(Denmark) Maja Bay Østergaard	Växjö	5
8	(Iceland) Fanney Birkisdóttir	Häcken	5
8	(Sweden) Moa Edrud	Rosengård	5

=== Discipline ===
==== Player ====
- Most yellow cards: 9
  - (Sweden) Nellie Persson (Vittsjö)
- Most red cards: 1
  - (United States) Rylie Combs (Eskilstuna United)
  - (Sweden) Emma Holmqvist (Djurgården)
  - (Faroe Islands) Ásla Johannesen (Piteå)

==== Club ====
- Most yellow cards: 26
  - AIK
  - Norrköping
- Most red cards: 1
  - Djurgården
  - Eskilstuna United
  - Piteå
- Fewest yellow cards: 15
  - Häcken
  - Kristianstad
  - Uppsala
- Fewest red cards: 0
  - AIK
  - Häcken
  - Hammarby
  - Kristianstad
  - Malmö
  - Norrköping
  - Rosengård
  - Uppsala
  - Växjö
  - Vittsjö

== Awards ==
=== Monthly awards ===
Players in italics left during the season

Month	Player of the Month		Other nominated players			
Month	Player	Club	Player	Club	Player	Club
April	(Iceland) Linda Líf Boama	Kristianstad	(Sweden) Nathalie Persson	Malmö	(Japan) Urara Watanabe	Djurgården
May	(Sweden) Nova Selin	AIK	(United States) Olivia García	AIK	(United States) Tabby Tindell	Häcken
June	(Serbia) Miljana Ivanović	Malmö	(Belarus) Anastasiya Pobegaylo	Rosengård	(Sweden) Felicia Schröder	Häcken
July	Summer break					
August	(Sweden) Maja Bodin	Häcken	(Iceland) Hlín Eiríksdóttir	Malmö	(United States) Tabby Tindell	Häcken
September	(Sweden) Anna Anvegård	Häcken	(Sweden) Moa Edrud	Rosengård	(Sweden) Amanda Wulff	Brommapojkarna
October	(United States) Tabby Tindell	Häcken	(Sweden) Moa Edrud	Rosengård	(Australia) Aivi Luik	Häcken
November						

=== Season awards ===
2026 Damallsvenskan Awards
Award	Winner	Club
Most Valuable Player		
Youth Prize		
Breakthrough of the Year		
Goal of the Year		
Team of the Year
Goalkeeper of the Year		
Defender of the Year		
Midfielder of the Year		
Forward of the Year		
Coach of the Year		
