= 2024 Division 1 (Swedish women's football) =

Division 1
- Season: 2024
- Dates: 5 April 2024 – 27 October 2024
- Matches played: 420
- Goals scored: 1,519 (3.62 per match)
- All statistics correct as of 15 September 2024.

The 2024 Division 1 is the third-tier women's football league in Sweden. The 2024 season is the second iteration since the introduction of the new format with only three groups (middle, north, south) of 14 teams each.

The 2024 schedule has been announced by SvFF on 18 January 2024. The first matchday has been scheduled for 6–7 April 2024, however, one group Södra match ended up being played already on 5 April 2024. The season should conclude by 27 October 2024.

== Teams ==
Locations of teams in the 2024 Division 1:
Norra group;
Mellersta group;
Södra group;
See cutout below for teams based in Stockholm County.
Locations of Stockholm County-based teams in the 2024 Division 1.

=== Team changes ===
Ifö Bromölla IF, relegated from Elitettan, has not been granted Division 1 license by SvFF and has thus been relegated directly to Division 2.

Västerås BK30 has pulled out of Division 1 in the 2024 season.

Entering league		Exiting league	
Promoted from Division 2	Relegated from 2023 Elitettan	Promoted to 2024 Elitettan	Relegated to Division 2
Älmhults IF (from södra Götaland); Alnö IF (from mellersta Norrland); Bergnäsets AIK (from norra Norrland norra); FC Djursholm (from mellersta Svealand, as runners-up) (Note: FC Djursholm was admitted to Division 1 as a replacement for Västerås BK30.); IF Elfsborg (from nordvästra Götaland); Gideonsbergs IF (from västra Svealand); Helsingborgs IF (from västra Götaland); Karlbergs BK (from mellersta Svealand); Tjust IF FF (from nordöstra Götaland); FC Trollhättan (from nordvästra Götaland, as runners-up) (Note: FC Trollhättan was admitted to Division 1 as a replacement for Ifö Bromölla IF who has not been granted 2024 license by SvFF.); Värmdö IF (from östra Svealand)	BK Häcken II (Södra); IK Rössö Uddevalla (Södra)	Malmö FF (Södra); Örebro SK (Mellersta); Sunnanå SK (Norra)	Hertzöga BK (to västra Svealand); IF Team Hudik (to södra Norrland); BK Kenty (to nordöstra Götaland); Kvarnsvedens IK (to mellersta Svealand); Lödöse Nygård IK (withdrew from Division 2); Mariebo IK (to nordöstra Götaland); Ope IF (to mellersta Norrland); Rävåsens IK (to västra Svealand); Södra Sandby IF (to södra Götaland)

== Groups ==
=== Norra ===
Pos	Team	Pld	W	D	L	GF	GA	GD	Pts	Promotion or relegation
1	Team TG	20	18	1	1	63	7	+56	55	Promotion to Elitettan
2	Gefle IF	20	14	1	5	52	24	+28	43	
3	Enskede IK (Note: Competed in Mellersta group in 2023.)	20	11	8	1	44	20	+24	41	
4	Sandvikens IF	20	12	4	4	42	20	+22	40	
5	Sollentuna FK	20	11	5	4	39	18	+21	38	
6	Heffnersklubbans BK	20	9	5	6	39	35	+4	32	
7	IFK Östersund	20	9	4	7	32	22	+10	31	
8	IK Brage	20	8	6	6	33	26	+7	30	
9	Karlbergs BK	20	5	4	11	14	22	−8	19	
10	Luleå DFF	20	4	4	12	27	43	−16	16	
11	Bele Barkarby FF	20	4	4	12	20	38	−18	16	
12	Bergnäsets AIK	20	4	4	12	27	55	−28	16	Relegation to Division 2
13	Själevads IK	20	3	3	14	23	66	−43	12	Relegation to Division 2
14	Alnö IF	20	0	3	17	11	70	−59	3	Relegation to Division 2

Updated to match(es) played on 15 September 2024. Source: SvenskFotboll.se
Rules for classification: 1) Points; 2) Goal difference; 3) Number of goals scored; 4) Head-to-head points; 5) Head-to-head goal difference; 6) Head-to-head away goals scored

==== Results ====
Home \ Away	ALN	BEL	BER	BRA	ENS	GEF	HEF	KAR	LUL	ÖST	SAN	SJÄ	SOL	TEA
Alnö IF	—		1–2		0–5		0–5	0–0	2–2	0–4	0–2	3–4	0–3	0–4
Bele Barkarby FF	6–0	—		0–2	0–2	1–5	1–2	0–0	3–2	0–0		1–0	0–1	
Bergnäsets AIK	4–3	1–1	—	1–2		0–7	1–1		1–3		2–2	3–2	1–4	0–3
IK Brage	6–0	3–0		—	0–0	1–0		2–2	3–1	1–1		4–1	1–2	0–3
Enskede IK	3–1		4–0	0–0	—	4–2	4–1	1–1	1–1	3–0	2–2	3–2	1–3	
Gefle IF	5–0	5–1	3–1		2–3	—		2–0		0–0		3–0	1–0	1–8
Heffnersklubbans BK		3–1	2–1	4–1	2–2	0–3	—			3–2	1–1	4–4		0–4
Karlbergs BK		1–2	3–2	1–0		0–2	0–1	—	2–0	0–1	0–1		0–1	0–2
Luleå DFF	5–1	3–2	3–3	2–2		0–2	0–3	0–2	—		0–2	1–2	0–4	
IFK Östersund	4–0	1–0	3–1	1–3		2–3	1–1	0–1	4–1	—	3–0		0–1	0–3
Sandvikens IF	3–0	2–1	2–1	2–0	1–2	1–2	3–0		2–1		—	8–1		0–2
Själevads IK	0–0		1–2		1–3	0–3	0–4	1–0	1–2	0–3	0–5	—	3–3	
Sollentuna FK		0–0	5–0	1–1	0–0		4–1	3–1		1–2	2–2		—	0–2
Team TG FF	3–0	5–0		4–1	1–1	2–1	2–1	1–0	1–0		0–1	11–0	2–1	—

Updated to match(es) played on 15 September 2024. Source: SvenskFotboll.se
Legend: Blue = home team win; Yellow = draw; Red = away team win.

=== Mellersta ===
Pos	Team	Pld	W	D	L	GF	GA	GD	Pts	Promotion or relegation
1	IF Elfsborg	20	15	3	2	59	17	+42	48	Promotion to Elitettan
2	Husqvarna FF	20	14	2	4	62	15	+47	44	
3	IFK Värnamo (Note: Competed in Södra group in 2023.)	20	14	2	4	70	27	+43	44	
4	FC Djursholm	20	12	4	4	44	31	+13	40	
5	Boo FF	20	11	5	4	32	19	+13	38	
6	Segeltorps IF	20	12	2	6	48	37	+11	38	
7	Degerfors IF	20	7	5	8	39	40	−1	26	
8	Tyresö FF	20	8	2	10	19	28	−9	26	
9	Smedby AIS	20	6	3	11	30	59	−29	21	
10	Gideonsbergs IF	20	5	4	11	22	43	−21	19	
11	Älvsjö AIK	20	4	6	10	26	37	−11	18	
12	Tjust IF	20	2	5	13	22	57	−35	11	Relegation to Division 2
13	P18 IK	20	2	4	14	14	42	−28	10	Relegation to Division 2
14	Värmdö IF	20	1	7	12	25	60	−35	10	Relegation to Division 2

Updated to match(es) played on 15 September 2024. Source: SvenskFotboll.se
Rules for classification: 1) Points; 2) Goal difference; 3) Number of goals scored; 4) Head-to-head points; 5) Head-to-head goal difference; 6) Head-to-head away goals scored

==== Results ====
Home \ Away	ÄLV	BOO	DEG	DJU	ELF	GID	HUS	P18	SEG	SME	TJU	TYR	VÄM	VÄN
Älvsjö AIK	—	0–2	3–2	1–2		0–0	1–3		0–3		2–2	0–1	5–1	1–2
Boo FF	1–1	—	2–1	2–1		2–1	1–0	2–1	1–2		3–0		2–1	1–1
Degerfors IF	1–0	2–1	—	2–3	1–3	4–2	1–7		3–1			2–2	4–1	2–2
FC Djursholm			2–1	—	3–3		2–5	1–0	1–1	5–2	6–3	2–1	3–0	3–1
IF Elfsborg	2–0	1–1	1–1		—	4–1	3–1	0–1	4–0	6–1	6–1			0–1
Gideonsbergs IF				0–0	0–8	—	1–1	2–0	1–3	1–3	3–2	3–0	2–3	3–2
Husqvarna FF		2–0		1–0	0–2	2–0	—	10–0	5–1	7–0	1–0	2–0	8–0	
P18 IK	0–2	1–1	2–3	1–2	1–2	0–0	0–0	—		1–1		0–3		3–5
Segeltorps IF	4–1		2–1			2–1	0–2	2–0	—	6–2	6–1	1–0	5–2	3–2
Smedby AIS	2–2	0–2	2–1	1–5	2–4	3–0	1–4	2–0	3–2	—				0–8
Tjust IF	1–1	2–2	1–4	1–2	1–4	0–1		2–1		0–3	—	2–0	1–1	
Tyresö FF	0–2	0–1	1–1		0–2			1–0	3–0	1–0	2–0	—	2–0	0–5
Värmdö IF	3–3	0–3	2–2	1–1	0–2			1–2	4–4	1–1	2–2	0–1	—	
IFK Värnamo	5–1	3–2		4–1	1–2	4–0	2–1			3–1	7–0	5–1	7–2	—

Updated to match(es) played on 15 September 2024. Source: SvenskFotboll.se
Legend: Blue = home team win; Yellow = draw; Red = away team win.

=== Södra ===
Pos	Team	Pld	W	D	L	GF	GA	GD	Pts	Promotion or relegation
1	Eskilsminne IF	20	14	5	1	66	21	+45	47	Promotion to Elitettan
2	IFK Göteborg	20	14	2	4	71	16	+55	44	
3	BK Häcken II	20	14	2	4	54	21	+33	44	
4	Helsingborgs IF	20	11	5	4	37	24	+13	38	
5	FC Trollhättan	20	10	4	6	41	36	+5	34	
6	IS Halmia	20	10	2	8	43	27	+16	32	
7	Älmhults IF	20	8	5	7	32	29	+3	29	
8	Örgryte IS	20	8	3	9	28	38	−10	27	
9	Halmstads BK	20	7	4	9	36	35	+1	25	
10	IFK Örby	20	6	3	11	35	42	−7	21	
11	FC Rosengård II	20	6	2	12	24	44	−20	20	
12	Ljungskile SK	20	4	4	12	30	59	−29	16	Relegation to Division 2
13	Onsala BK	20	3	4	13	32	65	−33	13	Relegation to Division 2
14	IK Rössö Uddevalla	20	2	1	17	12	84	−72	7	Relegation to Division 2

Updated to match(es) played on 15 September 2024. Source: SvenskFotboll.se
Rules for classification: 1) Points; 2) Goal difference; 3) Number of goals scored; 4) Head-to-head points; 5) Head-to-head goal difference; 6) Head-to-head away goals scored

==== Results ====
Home \ Away	ÄLM	ESK	GÖT	HÄ2	HAI	HAS	HEL	LJU	ONS	ÖRB	ÖRG	RO2	RÖS	TRO
Älmhults IF	—		1–0	1–3	0–2	3–1	1–1		2–2	3–0			6–0	0–4
Eskilsminne IF	2–1	—		2–0	4–0		1–2	3–2	5–1		1–1	4–4	8–0	5–1
IFK Göteborg	5–0	1–1	—			1–1	3–0	5–2	8–0	2–3	4–0	6–1		6–0
BK Häcken II	2–0		3–1	—	1–2	3–1	2–2	4–1	3–0	1–1	2–1	0–1		2–1
IS Halmia	1–2	2–3	0–2		—	3–0	1–2	1–2		3–2	1–0	3–0		1–3
Halmstads BK	2–2	1–1	1–3	0–3		—		4–0	3–1	4–1	0–2	2–1	3–0	
Helsingborgs IF		0–1	1–0	1–2	1–0	1–0	—			2–2	4–0		3–1	1–1
Ljungskile SK	1–1	0–5			1–5	3–2	2–2	—	4–3	2–2	0–2	0–3		2–3
Onsala BK	1–1		1–6	0–5	1–6	2–3	3–4	3–2	—	3–0	2–2			2–3
IFK Örby	0–2	0–1	1–3	1–2		3–2	0–3	5–0	3–1	—	2–3	0–2	4–1	
Örgryte IS	0–2	2–7		3–1	0–0				3–2	1–4	—	1–3	1–0	
FC Rosengård II	0–3	0–2	0–3	2–6	1–1		0–2	3–1	0–2			—	1–2	0–3
IK Rössö Uddevalla	2–1	0–7	0–10	0–9	1–9	0–4	0–2	2–4	2–2		0–3	1–2	—	0–1
FC Trollhättan		3–3	0–2		1–2	2–2	4–3	1–1		4–2	0–2	2–0	4–0	—

Updated to match(es) played on 15 September 2024. Source: SvenskFotboll.se
Legend: Blue = home team win; Yellow = draw; Red = away team win.
