= Andrea Thorisson =

Peruvian footballer (born 1998)

Personal information
- Full name: Andrea Celeste Thorisson Díaz
- Date of birth: 14 March 1998 (age 28)
- Place of birth: Malmö, Sweden
- Position: Forward

Team information
- Current team: Trelleborgs FF

Youth career
- BK Vången
- 2010–2015: FCR Malmö

Senior career*
Years	Team	Apps	(Gls)
2015–2017	FC Rosengård	6	(0)
2018	Kungsbacka DFF	24	(3)
2019	Limhamn Bunkeflo	15	(1)
2020–2021	IFK Kalmar	39	(6)
2022–2023	IK Uppsala	29	(3)
2024	Gamla Upsala SK	11	(1)
2024	IFK Kalmar	12	(2)
2025	Bollstanäs SK	19	(0)
2026	Trelleborgs FF		

International career^{‡}
2014	Iceland U16	9	(3)
2015	Iceland U17	5	(0)
2015–2016	Iceland U19	7	(2)
2025–	Peru	1	(0)
- * Club domestic league appearances and goals as of 11 October 2025 ‡ National team caps and goals as of 09:51, 25 May 2019 (UTC)

Andrea Celeste Thorisson Díaz (born 14 March 1998) is a footballer who plays as a midfielder for club Trelleborgs FF and the Peru national team. Born in Sweden, she has an Icelandic father and a Peruvian mother.

== Club career ==
In October 2015, Thorisson made her Damallsvenskan debut for FC Rosengård in a 3–0 home win over Umeå IK. She was an 87th-minute substitute for Marta. Thorisson was one of six youth players to be given a first-team contract by Rosengård in December 2015.

In search of regular first-team football, Thorisson left FC Rosengård in 2018 and signed for Kungsbacka DFF of the second-tier Elitettan. Despite helping Kungsbacka to promotion Thorisson left after one season. She joined Limhamn Bunkeflo because she wanted to live near her family in Scania and was unhappy that Kungsbacka Municipality failed to provide financial support they had promised to Kungsbacka DFF.

== International career ==
When Thorisson was 12 years old she played well in a match against a touring Icelandic team. Her father told the opposition coach of her Icelandic heritage and the coach passed the information on to the Football Association of Iceland. Later Thorrison was approached to play for Iceland's youth national team through her Rosengård teammates Sara Björk Gunnarsdóttir and Þóra Björg Helgadóttir. Thorrison has also trained with Sweden's youth national teams at Bosön and as of 2016 remained undecided about which national team to represent at senior level.

Before the men's 2018 FIFA World Cup in Russia, Thorisson diplomatically stated that she was supporting Sweden, Iceland and Peru equally. Ultimately she decided to make herself eligible to represent Iceland at senior international level.

== Honours ==
=== Club ===
FC Rosengård

- Damallsvenskan: 2015
- Svenska Cupen: 2015–16, 2016–17
- Svenska Supercupen: 2015, 2016
