= Anni Miettunen =

Finnish footballer (born 1997)

Personal information
- Full name: Anni Maaria Miettunen
- Date of birth: 19 October 1997 (age 29)
- Place of birth: Oulu, Finland
- Height: 1.65 m (5 ft 5 in)
- Position: Defender

Team information
- Current team: Gamla Upsala
- Number: 19

Youth career
- 2012–2014: ONS

Senior career*
Years	Team	Apps	(Gls)
2014–2017	ONS	84	(12)
2017–2019	FC Honka	36	(6)
2020–2021	Åland United	41	(3)
2022	Umeå	24	(0)
2023	Kalmar	16	(0)
2023–2024	Åland United	32	(4)
2025	Umeå	26	(0)
2026	Tromsø	8	(0)
2026–	Gamla Upsala	10	(0)

International career^{‡}
2016	Finland U19	0	(0)
2017	Finland U20	1	(0)
2018	Finland B	2	(0)
2021	Finland U23	1	(0)
2022–	Finland	0	(0)
- * Club domestic league appearances and goals as of 14 October 2026 ‡ National team caps and goals as of 14 October 2026

Anni Maaria Miettunen (Finnish: [ˈɑnːi ˈmɑːriɑ ˈmietːunen]; born 19 October 1997) is a Finnish footballer who plays as a full-back for Elitettan club Gamla Upsala and the Finland national team.

Born in Oulu, she began her career in her home city at Naisten Liiga club Oulu Nice Soccer (ONS), followed by a spell at FC Honka. She later moved to the Åland Islands and played for Åland United, before moving to Sweden for spells at Damallsvenskan clubs Umeå IK and IFK Kalmar. She later returned to Åland United before returning to Umeå in the Elitettan, then having a brief stint at Norwegian First Division club Tromsø IL before going back to the Elitettan to play for Gamla Upsala.

Internationally, Miettunen has represented Finland as a youth international, beginning with a call-up at under-19 level before being capped at under-20, under-23 and reserve level. In 2022, she received her first call-up to the senior national team, which remains her only one to date.

== Early life ==
Miettunen was born on 19 October 1997 in Oulu, North Ostrobothnia, Finland, where she grew up.

== Club career ==
=== Oulu Nice Soccer (2014–2017) ===
Miettunen began her senior footballing career at the age of 17, joining Naisten Liiga club Oulu Nice Soccer (ONS) in the 2014 season. The club suffered relegation to the Naisten Ykkönen that season.

In the 2015 season, Miettunen remained at the club. She was part of the team that won promotion back to the Naisten Liiga following a 5–1 aggregate win over Vasa IFK in the promotion/relegation playoffs.

During the 2017 season, Miettunen departed the club.

=== FC Honka (2017–2019) ===
During the 2017 season, Miettunen made a move across the Naisten Liiga to FC Honka.

At the end of the 2019 season, Miettunen departed the club.

=== Åland United (2020–2021) ===
Ahead of the 2020 season, Miettunen signed for Åland United, remaining in the Kansallinen Liiga but moving to the Åland Islands.

Ahead of the 2021 season, Miettunen extended her contract at the club. She departed the club at the end of the season.

=== Umeå IK (2022) ===
Ahead of the 2022 season, Miettunen moved to Sweden and signed for Damallsvenskan club Umeå IK. She was one of five Finnish players at the club that season, playing alongside defenders Katariina Kosola and Emma Santamäki, midfielder Vilma Koivisto and forward Henna-Riikka Honkanen, in addition to being managed by Åland Islander Samuel Fagerholm. She departed the club at the end of the season.

=== IFK Kalmar (2023) ===
Ahead of the 2023 season, Miettunen remained in Sweden and signed for Damallsvenskan club IFK Kalmar. However, she would only have a brief stint at the club, departing midseason.

=== Åland United (2023–2024) ===
During the 2023 season, Miettunen moved back to Finland and re-signed for Åland United in the Kansallinen Liiga.

Ahead of the 2024 season, Miettunen extended her contract at the club until the end of the season. She departed the club at the end of the season.

=== Umeå IK (2025) ===
Ahead of the 2025 season, Miettunen moved back to Sweden and returned to Umeå IK, this time in the Elitettan. She departed the club at the end of the season.

=== Tromsø IL (2026) ===
Ahead of the 2026 season, Miettunen moved to Norway and signed for Norwegian First Division (1. Divisjon) Tromsø IL. However, her time at the club would not last long, as she departed midseason.

=== Gamla Upsala (2026–) ===
During the 2026 season, Miettunen returned to Sweden and signed for Elitettan club Gamla Upsala.

== International career ==
=== Finland U19 ===
Miettunen was selected for the Finland under-19 national team by manager Marianne Miettinen for the 2016 UEFA Women's Under-19 Championship qualification elite round, in which Finland were drawn into Group B in the Netherlands. She played in none of the three matches, which were a 2–1 victory over Belarus, a 2–1 loss to the Czech Republic and a 1–1 draw with the Netherlands, all held at Sportpark De Bijenkamp in Eibergen. Having finished third in the group (with only the winner advancing), Finland were eliminated and thus failed to qualify for the tournament proper in Slovakia.

=== Finland U20 ===
Miettunen was selected for the Finland under-20 national team by manager Rosa Lappi-Seppälä as part of a 20-player squad for a three-match friendly series against the United States on 7, 9 and 11 December 2017 at Premier Sports Campus in Lakewood Ranch, Florida.

=== Finland B ===
Miettunen was selected for the Finland national B team by manager Lappi-Seppälä as part of a 20-player squad for a two-match friendly series against the Latvia senior national team on 4 and 6 April 2018 at the Elektrum Olympic Centre in Rīga, Latvia. She was named as a replacement for midfielder Roosa Bröijer.

=== Finland U23 ===
Miettunen was selected for the Finland under-23 national team by English manager Gary Williams as part of a 23-player squad for a friendly against France on 12 June 2021 at Munkedals IP in Munkedal, Sweden. She started the match before being replaced by defender Emmi Siren in the 61st minute, with France winning the match 2–1.

=== Finland ===
Miettunen received her first call-up for the Finland senior national team when interim manager Marko Saloranta selected her as part of a squad for two 2023 FIFA Women's World Cup qualification group stage matches against the Republic of Ireland and Sweden on 1 and 6 September 2022. She was brought into the team as an injury replacement for midfielders Emmi Alanen and Adelina Engman. Finland lost the first match 1–0 away to Ireland at Tallaght Stadium in Dublin, while they lost the second match 5–0 at home to Sweden at Tampere Stadium in Tampere. Finland finished third in Group A (with the top two teams advancing), thus eliminating them from the tournament proper in Australia and New Zealand.

== Career statistics ==
=== Club ===
As of 14 October 2026

Appearances and goals by club, season and competition
Club	Season	League			Domestic cup			Other		Total	
Club	Season	Division	Apps	Goals	Cup	Apps	Goals	Apps	Goals	Apps	Goals
ONS Oulu	2014	Naisten Liiga	22	0	Finnish Women's Cup	0	0	—N/a		22	0
ONS Oulu	2015	Naisten Ykkönen	21	7	Finnish Women's Cup	0	0	2	0	23	7
ONS Oulu	2016	Naisten Liiga	24	2	Finnish Women's Cup	0	0	—N/a		24	2
ONS Oulu	2017	Naisten Liiga	17	3	Finnish Women's Cup	0	0	—N/a		17	3
ONS Oulu	Total		84	12	Total	0	0	2	0	86	12
FC Honka	2017	Naisten Liiga	1	0	Finnish Women's Cup	0	0	—N/a		1	0
FC Honka	2018	Naisten Liiga	15	2	Finnish Women's Cup	1	0	—N/a		16	2
FC Honka	2019	Naisten Liiga	20	4	Finnish Women's Cup	4	1	—N/a		24	5
FC Honka	Total		36	6	Total	5	1	—N/a		41	7
Åland United	2020	Kansallinen Liiga	18	2	Finnish Women's Cup	5	1	—N/a		23	3
Åland United	2021	Kansallinen Liiga	23	1	Finnish Women's Cup	4	0	—N/a		27	1
Åland United	Total		41	3	Total	9	1	—N/a		50	4
Umeå IK	2022	Damallsvenskan	24	0	Svenska Cupen	4	3	—N/a		28	3
Umeå IK	Total		24	0	Total	4	3	—N/a		28	3
IFK Kalmar	2023	Damallsvenskan	16	0	Svenska Cupen	0	0	—N/a		16	0
IFK Kalmar	Total		16	0	Total	0	0	—N/a		16	0
Åland United	2023	Kansallinen Liiga	8	2	Finnish Women's Cup	0	0	—N/a		8	2
Åland United	2024	Kansallinen Liiga	24	2	Finnish Women's Cup	3	0	—N/a		27	2
Åland United	Total		32	4	Total	3	0	—N/a		35	4
Umeå IK	2025	Elitettan	26	0	Svenska Cupen	5	0	—N/a		31	0
Umeå IK	Total		26	0	Total	5	0	—N/a		31	0
Tromsø IL	2026	Norwegian First Division	8	0	Norwegian Women's Cup	3	0	—N/a		11	0
Tromsø IL	Total		8	0	Total	3	0	—N/a		11	0
Gamla Upsala	2026	Elitettan	10	0	Svenska Cupen	2	0	—N/a		12	0
Gamla Upsala	Total		10	0	Total	2	0	—N/a		12	0
Career total			277	25	Total	31	5	2	0	310	30

=== International ===
Appearances and goals by national team and year
National team	Year	Apps	Goals
Finland U19	2016	0	0
Finland U20	2017	1	0
Finland B	2018	2	0
Finland U23	2021	1	0
Finland	2022	0	0

== Activism ==
Having played in the league herself, Miettunen has vocally criticised issues in the Kansallinen Liiga, advocating for more and better facilities, better working conditions and higher standards in Finnish women's football. Her concerns over these issues were recognised by the league and by the Football Association of Finland (SPL).
