= 2025 Elitettan =

Swedish women's football second division, 2025 season

Elitettan
- Season: 2025
- Dates: 11 April – 15 November 2025
- Champions: Eskilstuna United
- Promoted: Eskilstuna United; Uppsala
- Relegated: Bollstanäs; Mallbacken; Sunnanå
- Matches: 182
- Goals: 586 (3.22 per match)
- Top goalscorer: Nicole Robertson (24 goals)
- Biggest home win: Eskilstuna United 5–0 Team TG (25 May 2025); Jitex 5–0 Team TG (18 June 2025); Gamla Upsala 6–1 Mallbacken (27 June 2025); Uppsala 6–1 Mallbacken (30 August 2025)
- Biggest away win: Team TG 0–6 KIF Örebro (3 August 2025); Team TG 1–7 Umeå (5 October 2025)
- Highest scoring: Team TG 1–7 Umeå (5 October 2025)
- Highest attendance: 3,298; IF Elfsborg 0–1 Eskilstuna United (6 September 2025)
- Lowest attendance: 47; Team TG 1–4 Elfsborg (26 April 2025)
- Total attendance: 46,194
- Average attendance: 254

The 2025 Elitettan was the 13th season of the Elitettan, the second division of women's football in Sweden. The season began on 11 April and ended on 15 November.

Malmö FF were the reigning champions, and were promoted to the Damallsvenskan alongside Alingsås IF in the previous season.

Eskilstuna United were promoted to the 2026 Damallsvenskan following a 5–0 win over KIF Örebro on 1 November. IK Uppsala were promoted on 8 November following Umeå IK's 3–2 home win over newly-relegated Trelleborgs FF. KIF Örebro qualified for the promotion/relegation playoff, in which they were defeated 4–0 on aggregate by Damallsvenskan side IF Brommapojkarna.

Bollstanäs SK, Mallbackens IF and Sunnanå SK were relegated to the 2026 Division 1.

== Teams ==
Locations of teams in the 2025 Elitettan.

Team	Home city	Home ground	Capacity
Bollstanäs SK	Upplands Väsby	Bollstanäs IP	1,000
Eskilstuna United	Eskilstuna	Tunavallen	7,800
Gamla Upsala	Uppsala	Lötens IP	2,500
BK Häcken II	Gothenburg	Gothia Park Academy	
IF Elfsborg	Borås	Borås Arena	14,500
Jitex BK	Mölndal	Åbyvallen	1,500
Mallbackens IF	Lysvik	Strandvallen	2,000
KIF Örebro	Örebro	Behrn Arena	12,624
Örebro SK	Örebro	Eyravallen	12,645
Sunnanå SK	Skellefteå	Norrvalla IP	1,500
Team TG FF	Umeå	Umeå Energi Arena	6,000
Trelleborgs FF	Trelleborg	Vångavallen	7,400
Umeå IK	Umeå	Umeå Energi Arena	6,000
IK Uppsala	Uppsala	Studenternas IP	10,522

== League table ==
Pos	Team	Pld	W	D	L	GF	GA	GD	Pts	Promotion or relegation
1	Eskilstuna United (P)	26	21	2	3	67	17	+50	65	Promotion to the Damallsvenskan
2	IK Uppsala (P)	26	19	2	5	62	23	+39	59	Promotion to the Damallsvenskan
3	KIF Örebro	26	17	4	5	66	34	+32	55	Qualification for the Damallsvenskan play-off
4	Trelleborgs FF	26	17	3	6	54	27	+27	54	
5	Umeå IK	26	14	9	3	53	23	+30	51	
6	Jitex BK	26	12	4	10	52	50	+2	40	
7	IF Elfsborg	26	11	3	12	41	34	+7	36	
8	Örebro SK	26	10	3	13	38	36	+2	33	
9	BK Häcken II (Note: BK Häcken II are the reserve team of BK Häcken and were therefore ineligible for promotion.)	26	6	7	13	27	48	−21	25	
10	Gamla Upsala	26	6	4	16	32	66	−34	22	
11	Team TG FF	26	6	4	16	23	59	−36	22	
12	Bollstanäs SK (R)	26	5	6	15	23	55	−32	21	Relegation to Division 1
13	Mallbackens IF (R)	26	4	6	16	23	63	−40	18	Relegation to Division 1
14	Sunnanå SK (R)	26	3	5	18	25	51	−26	14	Relegation to Division 1

Source: SvenskFotboll.se
Rules for classification: 1) Points; 2) Goal difference; 3) Number of goals scored; 4) Head-to-head points; 5) Head-to-head goal difference; 6) Head-to-head away goals scored
(P) Promoted; (R) Relegated

== Results ==
Home \ Away	BOL	ELF	ESK	GUP	HÄK	JIT	KÖR	MAL	ÖRS	SUN	TTG	TRE	UME	UPS
Bollstanäs SK	—	3–2	1–4	2–1	0–0	0–3	1–2	2–2	0–0	0–0	2–4	1–0	1–1	0–4
IF Elfsborg	2–1	—	0–1	2–1	0–1	3–1	1–1	0–1	2–1	3–0	1–2	2–2	1–0	2–2
Eskilstuna United	3–0	2–0	—	4–0	4–0	3–1	2–1	3–0	2–0	2–0	5–0	2–0	0–1	3–1
Gamla Upsala	1–0	2–1	1–5	—	1–0	1–1	2–5	6–1	0–1	1–1	1–3	1–2	0–5	0–5
BK Häcken II	2–0	0–2	1–4	5–1	—	0–1	0–2	3–0	0–2	1–1	1–1	0–4	1–1	0–2
Jitex BK	2–2	2–1	1–2	4–3	3–3	—	2–3	4–3	1–4	4–3	5–0	1–2	0–4	1–0
KIF Örebro	2–3	2–1	0–5	4–0	4–0	2–1	—	1–0	3–1	5–4	5–0	1–2	0–0	1–2
Mallbackens IF	2–1	1–6	1–1	1–2	1–1	0–4	2–5	—	1–1	1–0	0–1	0–3	2–2	0–2
Örebro SK	3–0	0–1	1–5	1–2	3–0	1–2	2–3	4–0	—	3–1	2–2	1–2	1–2	1–0
Sunnanå SK	1–2	1–2	0–0	2–1	1–2	0–1	1–2	0–2	2–3	—	2–1	2–3	1–1	0–1
Team TG FF	2–0	1–4	0–1	2–2	0–2	0–2	0–6	1–0	0–1	0–1	—	1–1	1–7	0–2
Trelleborgs FF	3–1	3–1	2–1	3–0	3–0	4–1	0–0	4–1	1–0	4–0	3–1	—	0–1	0–1
Umeå IK	3–0	2–1	1–2	4–0	2–2	3–3	2–2	0–0	1–0	3–1	2–0	3–2	—	2–0
IK Uppsala	6–0	1–0	4–1	2–2	5–2	3–1	0–4	6–1	3–1	3–0	1–0	4–1	2–0	—

Source: SvenskFotboll.se
Legend: Blue = home team win; Yellow = draw; Red = away team win.

== Promotion playoffs ==
Team 1	Agg.	Team 2	1st leg	2nd leg
IF Brommapojkarna	4–0	KIF Örebro	2–0	2–0

20 November 2025
19:00 CEST

KIF Örebro	0–2	IF Brommapojkarna
	Report	Priks 38'; Lillbäck 46'

Eyravallen, Örebro
Attendance: 638
Referee: Lovisa Johansson

KIF Örebro	IF Brommapojkarna

GK	12	Julia Langörgen
RB	2	Vera Andersson (substituted off) 66'
CB	3	Sofia Parkner
CB	4	Johanna Alm
LB	5	Julia Walentowicz (c)
DM	8	Veera Hellman
RW	13	Emilia Jägestedt Widstrand
CM	18	Bella Sember
LW	10	Ella Frost
ST	9	Cajsa Rubensson
ST	14	Helene Gross-Benberg
Substitutions:
GK	22	Stina Krakowski
DF	16	Saga Nordin
DF	20	Stina Dahlman (substituted on) 66'
MF	6	Stina Zakrisson
MF	7	Tuva Frejd Bark
MF	15	Ella Dahlkvist
MF	19	Lilly Andersson
MF	48	Stella Lambertsson

GK	1	Clara Ekstrand
RB	2	Amanda Wulff
CB	19	Alice Wahlberg
CB	3	Julia Olsson
LB	5	Wilma Wärulf
RM	21	Adelina Engman (substituted off) 74'
CM	8	Johanna Svedberg
CM	17	Augusta Priks (substituted off) 46'
LM	14	Frida Thörnqvist
ST	11	Ellen Toivio (c) (substituted off) 74'
ST	10	Louise Lillbäck (substituted off) 90+1'
Substitutions:
GK	20	Emilia Johansson
DF	4	Julia Laukström
DF	25	Joanna Aalstad Bækkelund
MF	6	Sara Frigren (substituted on) 90+1'
MF	7	Vera Blom (substituted on) 46'
MF	15	Isabelle Navrén (substituted on) 74'
MF	18	Ida Bengtsson
MF	23	Sofia Paulsson
FW	9	Emma Engström (substituted on) 74'

23 November 2025
14:00 CEST

IF Brommapojkarna	2–0	KIF Örebro
Thörnqvist 55'; Engström 90+1'	Report

Grimsta IP
Attendance: 195
Referee: Tess Olofsson

Brommapojkarna won 4–0 on aggregate

== Statistics ==
As of 16 November 2025

=== Top scorers ===
Rank	Player	Club	Goals
1	(United States) Nicole Robertson	Umeå	24
2	(Sweden) Stina Jensen	Elfsborg	16
3	(Sweden) Cajsa Rubensson	KIF Örebro	14
3	(United States) Bella Sember	KIF Örebro	14
3	(Sweden) Molly Wiklander	Örebro SK	14
6	(Sweden) Ida Kjellman	Jitex	13
7	(Sweden) Linnea Prambrant	Trelleborg	12
7	(Sweden) Felicia Rogić	Eskilstuna United	12
9	(Finland) Viivi Ollonqvist	Eskilstuna United	10
9	(Sweden) Hanna Persson	Trelleborg	10
9	(Sweden) Thelma Persson Welin	Trelleborg	10

==== Hat-tricks ====
Player	For	Against	Result	Date
(Sweden) Olivia Alcaide	Jitex	Gamla Upsala	4–3 (H)	18 April 2025
(Sweden) Felicia Rogić	Eskilstuna United	Örebro SK	5–1 (A)	4 May 2025
(Sweden) Stina Jensen	Elfsborg	Mallbacken	6–1 (A)	7 June 2025
(Sweden) Tilde Ahlén (Note: Scored four goals)	Gamla Upsala	Mallbacken	6–1 (H)	27 July 2025
(United States) Nicole Robertson	Umeå	Bollstanäs	3–0 (H)	2 August 2025
(Sweden) Molly Wiklander	Örebro SK	Mallbacken	4–0 (H)	26 September 2025
(Sweden) Thelma Persson Telin	Trelleborg	Jitex	4–1 (H)	27 September 2025
(Netherlands) Sheila van den Bulk	Eskilstuna United	Gamla Upsala	5–1 (A)	8 November 2025
