= Fagerholm (surname) =

Fagerholm is a Swedish-language surname, more common in Finland than in Sweden.

== Geographical distribution ==
As of 2014, 62.7% of all known bearers of the surname Fagerholm were residents of Finland (frequency 1:7,129), 23.5% of Sweden (1:34,072), 9.5% of the United States (1:3,087,618) and 2.5% of Norway (1:165,882).

In Finland, the frequency of the surname was higher than national average (1:7,129) in the following regions:

1. Åland (1:547)
2. Ostrobothnia (1:934)
3. Southwest Finland (1:4,896)
4. Uusimaa (1:4,969)
5. Central Ostrobothnia (1:5,573)

In Sweden, the frequency of the surname was higher than national average (1:34,072) in the following counties:

1. Halland County (1:11,761)
2. Södermanland County (1:17,451)
3. Stockholm County (1:19,341)
4. Kalmar County (1:23,637)
5. Kronoberg County (1:27,340)
6. Värmland County (1:30,826)
7. Västmanland County (1:32,422)

== People ==
- Karl-August Fagerholm (1901–1984), Finnish politician
- Anneli Aarika-Szrok (1924–2004), née Fagerholm, Finnish opera singer
- Monika Fagerholm (born 1961), Finnish author
- Michael Monroe (born 1962), real name Matti Antero Kristian Fagerholm, Finnish rock musician
- Ardis Fagerholm (born 1971), Swedish pop singer
- Samuel Fagerholm (born 1992), Finnish football manager and former footballer
