= Nora Håheim =

Norwegian footballer (born 2002)

Personal information
- Full name: Nora Harnes Håheim
- Date of birth: 14 March 2002 (age 24)
- Height: 1.75 m (5 ft 9 in)
- Position: Forward

Team information
- Current team: Aalesunds FK

Youth career
- 2014–2016: Harøya
- 2017–2018: Gossen
- 2019–2021: Molde

Senior career*
Years	Team	Apps	(Gls)
2017	Træff/Gossen	6	(10)
2018–2021	Molde	45	(41)
2022–2023	AaFK Fortuna	54	(20)
2024	KIF Örebro	26	(3)
2025	Lyn	20	(0)
2025–2026	Paris FC	14	(0)
2026–	Aalesunds FK	0	(0)

International career^{‡}
2023–	Norway U23	5	(1)
- * Club domestic league appearances and goals as of 20:39, 5 June 2026 (UTC) ‡ National team caps and goals as of 02:42, 30 November 2025 (UTC)

Nora Harnes Håheim (born 14 March 2002) is a Norwegian professional footballer who plays as a forward for Toppserien club Aalesunds FK. She has previously played for Norwegian clubs Molde and Lyn, as well as KIF Örebro DFF of the Swedish Damallsvenskan and Paris FC of the French Première Ligue.

== Early life ==
Håheim grew up on the Norwegian island of Harøya alongside her two parents and two older sisters. Influenced by the strong presence of football in her family, Håheim started playing at age 5 for the island's girls team. She then traversed through the local football system, including stints on boys teams and with Træff/Gossen, before joining the youth teams of Molde. For half a year, Håheim traveled to the mainland four times a week to train with Molde; at age 16, she left home and moved permanently to the city of Molde to cut down on the commute.

== Club career ==
=== Molde ===
Håheim had a prolific career with Molde FK, netting 41 goals in 45 games across three seasons with the club's first team. In 2021, her final season with Molde, she scored 19 goals in 11 games. Despite finding the back of the net regularly, Håheim was unable to help Molde get promoted to the Norwegian First Division in any of her four years with the team. Although the outcome appeared possible on multiple occasions, Molde were not able to thwart rivals AaFK Fortuna and earn promotion.

=== AaFK Fortuna ===
Leading up to the 2022 season, Håheim fielded offers from a variety of Toppserien teams. However, she chose to sign for the team which had received promotion to the Norwegian second tier instead of Molde, AaFK Fortuna. In her first year with Fortuna, Håheim was the top scorer on the team. One of her ten goals, which came against Klepp IL, was named the league's Goal of the Season. Håheim was also nominated for the Norwegian First Division's Young Player of the Year award.

Håheim built upon her success in her second year with Fortuna, scoring a large quantity of goals to become the second-highest scorer in the league for 2023. She left the club at the end of 2023 having scored 20 goals and registered 11 assists across two years; nine of her assists took place in her first season alone.

=== KIF Örebro ===
After leaving Fortuna, Håheim trained with German Frauen-Bundesliga club SGS Essen. She ultimately ended up instead joining Swedish club KIF Örebro, marking her first time playing for a top-division team. Playing mostly as a right winger, she registered 26 appearances and 3 goals over the course of the 2024 Damallsvenskan. In the final match of Örebro's 2023–24 Svenska Cupen campaign, she scored five minutes after coming in to a match against Djurgårdens IF to secure Örebro's lone win of the group stage. Håheim chose to depart from Örebro after the team finished 2024 in 13th place and were relegated to the Elitettan.

=== Lyn ===
In January 2025, Håheim moved back to Norway and joined first-division Toppserien team Lyn on a free transfer. In her sole season with Lyn, Håheim recorded 7 assists across 20 matches, which was the second-highest in the league. 4 of her 7 assists occurred in a six-match window that stretched from 7 June to a match on 16 August in which Håheim received her first Toppserien red card; the ensuing suspension appeared to stop Håheim's flow of assists, as she did not register any further goal contributions over the remainder of the season. Despite having signed a two-year contract with the Lyn, Håheim was sold at the end of 2025 after only nine months. The transfer fee that Lyn received in exchange for Håheim was the largest in club history.

=== Paris FC ===
On 16 September 2025, French club Paris FC officially confirmed the signing of Håheim. Håheim made her Première Ligue debut five days later, coming on as a late-game substitute in Paris FC's second match of the season. On 7 October, Håheim received her first start for her new team and played in her first UEFA Women's Champions League match as Paris FC drew with Oud-Heverlee Leuven, 2–2. She scored her only goal for Paris FC on 10 January 2026, helping her team beat RC Lens and advance to the Coupe de France Round of 16. In her loan season in Paris, Håheim totaled 23 appearances across all competitions.

=== Aalesunds FK ===
In June 2026, Paris FC transferred Håheim to Norwegian first-division club Aalesunds FK, which Håheim had previously played for from 2022 to 2023 under the era of AaFK Fortuna.

== International career ==
At the start of 2023, Håheim received her first call-up to the Norway under-23 national team. She made four appearances in her first year with the U23s and netted one goal.
