= Beatrice Gärds =

Swedish footballer

Personal information
- Full name: Beatrice Gärds
- Date of birth: February 10, 1997 (age 29)
- Place of birth: Sweden
- Position: Midfielder

Team information
- Current team: KIF Örebro DFF
- Number: 18

College career
Years	Team	Apps	(Gls)
2018–2019	EFSC Titans	0	(0)

Senior career*
Years	Team	Apps	(Gls)
2013–2020	Kvarnsvedens IK	98	(1)
2021–2023	IK Uppsala	70	(0)
2024–	KIF Örebro DFF	4	(0)
- * Club domestic league appearances and goals as of 8 May 2024

Beatrice Gärds (born 10 February 1997) is a Swedish footballer who plays as a midfielder for Damallsvenskan club KIF Örebro DFF.
