= Ella Frost =

American soccer player (born 2003)

Personal information
- Date of birth: July 17, 2003 (age 23)
- Height: 5 ft 4 in (1.63 m)
- Position: Midfielder

Team information
- Current team: KIF Örebro
- Number: 10

Youth career
- OC Surf SC
- West Coast FC

College career
Years	Team	Apps	(Gls)
2021–2024	Denver Pioneers	77	(17)

Senior career*
Years	Team	Apps	(Gls)
2025–	KIF Örebro	51	(8)
- * Club domestic league appearances and goals

Ella Frost (born July 17, 2003) is an American professional soccer player who plays as a midfielder for Damallsvenskan club KIF Örebro. She played college soccer for the Denver Pioneers and was named the Summit League Midfielder of the Year in 2024.

== Early life ==
Frost grew up in Palos Verdes Estates, California. Both her parents played college soccer: her mother, Jill, for UC Santa Barbara, and her father, J.B., for UCLA. She has three siblings. She played high school soccer at Palos Verdes High School, receiving all-area honors. She played DA club soccer for OC Surf SC and West Coast FC.

== College career ==
Frost played in all 21 games and scored 2 goals for the Denver Pioneers as a freshman in 2021. She helped Denver win their fourth consecutive Summit League regular-season title. She became a starter as a sophomore in 2022, scoring 4 goals in 19 appearances as the Pioneers again repeated as regular-season champions. She scored 4 goals in 18 games mainly off the bench in her junior year in 2023, again taking the conference regular-season title with Denver. In her senior year in 2024, she started all 19 games and led the Pioneers with 7 goals (top three in the conference), garnering recognition as first-team all-conference and the Summit League Midfielder of the Year.

== Club career ==
Swedish club KIF Örebro announced on March 27, 2025, that they had signed Frost to her first professional contract on a one-year deal. She was the replacement for compatriot Rowan Lapi, who was injured in preseason. She made her professional debut on April 19, the second day of the Elitettan season, giving the ball away for the deciding goal in a 2–1 defeat to Trelleborg.

Frost quickly established herself in the starting lineup and played nearly every minute for the club. She scored her first professional goal in a 3–2 win over Jitex on August 23, 2025. She finished the season with 6 goals as KIF Örebro reached the promotion playoffs, where they lost 4–0 on aggregate to Brommapojkarna.

Frost signed a one-year extension with KIF Örebro before the next season. On November 6, 2026, she made her 50th career Elitettan appearance in a 4–0 victory over Linköping. She finished the season with 2 goals as KIF Örebro gained promotion through the playoffs winning 5–4 on aggregate against FC Rosengård.

== Honors and awards ==
Denver Pioneers

- Summit League: 2021, 2022, 2023

Individual

- Summit League Midfielder of the Year: 2024
