= 2027 Damallsvenskan =

Swedish women's football top division, 2027 season

Damallsvenskan
- Season: 2027
- Dates: TBC
- Total attendance: 0

The 2027 Damallsvenskan, known as the 2027 OBOS Damallsvenskan for sponsorship reasons, will be the 40th season of the Damallsvenskan, the top division of women's football in Sweden.

BK Häcken are the reigning champions, having won their third ever title and second consecutive title in the previous season.

== Teams ==
Location of teams in the 2026 Damallsvenskan
Location of teams in the 2026 Damallsvenskan in Stockholm Municipality

Team	Location	Stadium	Stadium capacity (Note: According to each club information page previously available at the Swedish Football Association website for Damallsvenskan, unless otherwise noted. Numbers are usually lower than official stadium numbers.)
AIK	Stockholm (Solna)	Skytteholms IP	5,200
BK Häcken	Gothenburg (Brämaregården)	Bravida Arena	6,500
Djurgårdens IF	Stockholm (Villastaden)	Stockholm Olympic Stadium	14,417
Eskilstuna United	Eskilstuna	Tunavallen	7,800
Hammarby IF	Stockholm (Skanstull)	Hammarby IP	3,700
Hammarby IF	Stockholm (Johanneshov)	3Arena	30,000
IF Brommapojkarna	Stockholm (Vällingby)	Grimsta IP	5,000
IF Brommapojkarna	Stockholm (Kristineberg)	Kristinebergs IP	1,500
IF Elfsborg	Borås	Borås Arena	14,500
IFK Göteborg	Gothenburg	Valhalla IP	1,500
Kristianstads DFF	Kristianstad	Kristianstads Fotbollsarena	3,080 (Note: According to the history page on Kristianstad's website.)
Malmö FF	Malmö (Stadionområdet)	Eleda Stadion	26,500
Malmö FF	Malmö (Stadionområdet)	Malmö Stadion	22,500
IFK Norrköping	Norrköping	PlatinumCars Arena	17,234
Piteå IF	Piteå	LF Arena	6,500
Piteå IF	Luleå	JIABvallen	1,503
Vittsjö GIK	Vittsjö	Vittsjö IP	3,000

=== Personnel and kits ===
Team	Manager	Captain	Kit manufacturer

=== Managerial changes ===
Team	Outgoing manager	Manner of departure	Date of vacancy	Position in table	Incoming manager	Date of appointment

== League table ==
Pos	Team	Pld	W	D	L	GF	GA	GD	Pts	Qualification or relegation
1	AIK	0	0	0	0	0	0	0	0	Qualification for the Champions League second qualifying round
2	IF Brommapojkarna	0	0	0	0	0	0	0	0	Qualification for the Champions League second qualifying round
3	Djurgårdens IF	0	0	0	0	0	0	0	0	Qualification for the Champions League second qualifying round
4	IF Elfsborg	0	0	0	0	0	0	0	0	
5	Eskilstuna United	0	0	0	0	0	0	0	0	
6	IFK Göteborg	0	0	0	0	0	0	0	0	
7	BK Häcken	0	0	0	0	0	0	0	0	
8	Hammarby IF	0	0	0	0	0	0	0	0	
9	Kristianstads DFF	0	0	0	0	0	0	0	0	
10	Malmö FF	0	0	0	0	0	0	0	0	
11	IFK Norrköping	0	0	0	0	0	0	0	0	
12	Piteå IF	0	0	0	0	0	0	0	0	Qualification for the relegation playoffs
13	Vittsjö GIK	0	0	0	0	0	0	0	0	Relegation to the Elitettan
14	TBD	0	0	0	0	0	0	0	0	Relegation to the Elitettan

First match(es) will be played: to be determined. Source: Swedish Football Association (in Swedish)
Rules for classification: 1) Points; 2) Goal difference; 3) Number of goals scored; 4) Head-to-head points; 5) Head-to-head goal difference; 6) Head-to-head away goals scored

== Season statistics ==
Players in italics left during the season

=== Top scorers ===
Rank	Player	Club	Goals

==== Hat tricks ====
Player	For	Against	Result	Date

=== Clean sheets ===
Rank	Player	Club	Clean sheets

== Awards ==
=== Monthly awards ===
Players in italics left during the season

Month	Player of the Month		Other nominated players			
Month	Player	Club	Player	Club	Player	Club

=== Season awards ===
2027 Damallsvenskan Awards
Award	Winner	Club
Most Valuable Player		
Youth Prize		
Breakthrough of the Year		
Goal of the Year		
Team of the Year
Goalkeeper of the Year		
Defender of the Year		
Midfielder of the Year		
Forward of the Year		
Coach of the Year		
