= Division 2 (Swedish women's football) =

Women's association football league in Sweden

Division 2 (Swedish: Division 2 i fotboll för damer) is the fourth level in the league system of Swedish women's football and comprises 9 sections with 10 football teams in each.

== Current sections - 2019 season ==
Div 2 Norra Norrland

Alviks IK | Assi IF | Hägglunds IoFK | IFK Åkullsjön | Infjärdens SK | Köpmanholmen-Bjästa IF | Luleå DFC | Mariehem SK | Morön BK | Notvikens IK

Div 2 Södra Norrland

Frösö IF | IF Team Hudik | Krokom/ Dvärsätt IF | Ljusdals IF | Myssjö-Ovikens IF | Remsle UIF FF | Selånger FK | Sund IF | Sundsvall FK | Östersunds DFF

Div 2 Norra Svealand

IK Huge | KIF Örebro DUFF | Korsnäs IF FK | Stensätra IF | Strömsbro IF | Västanfors IF FK | Västerås BK 30 | Västerås IK | Örebro SK Söder

Div 2 Östra Svealand

Bajen DFF | Bele Barkarby FF | Dalhem IF | Danmark-Sirius DFF | Gimo IF FK | IF Brommapojkarna | IFK Lidingö FK | IFK Täby FK | Roslagsbro IF | Tierps IF

Div 2 Södra Svealand

Borens IK | Enskede IK | Haninge DFF | IFK Nyköping | Kisa BK | Smedby AIS | Stuvsta IF | Telge United FF | Triangelns IK | Tyresö DFF

Div 2 Norra Götaland

IF Viken | IFK Skoghall DF | IK Arvika Fotboll | IK Gauthiod | IK Rössö Uddevalla | Mallbackens IF | Mariestads BoIS FF | Skövde KIK | Stångenäs AIS | Ämterviks FF

Div 2 Östra Götaland

Asarums IF FK | Glimåkra IF | Habo IF | IFK Värnamo | Landsbro IF | Lindsdals IF | Lörby IF | Madesjö IF | Rödeby AIF | Älmhults IF

Div 2 Västra Götaland

Derome BK | Husqvarna FF | IF Norvalla | IK Friscopojkarna | Jitex DFF | Mariebo IK | Qviding FIF | Skepplanda BTK | Torslanda IK | Vallens IF

Div 2 Södra Götaland

Borgeby FK | Falkenbergs FF | Husie IF | Höllvikens GIF | IF Böljan | IF Limhamn Bunkeflo | IS Halmia | Ljungby IF | Stattena IF | Valinge IF
