= IF Limhamn Bunkeflo =

IF Limhamn Bunkeflo may refer to

- IF Limhamn Bunkeflo (men's)
- IF Limhamn Bunkeflo (women's)
