= Samuel Fagerholm =

Finnish footballer and manager (born 1992)

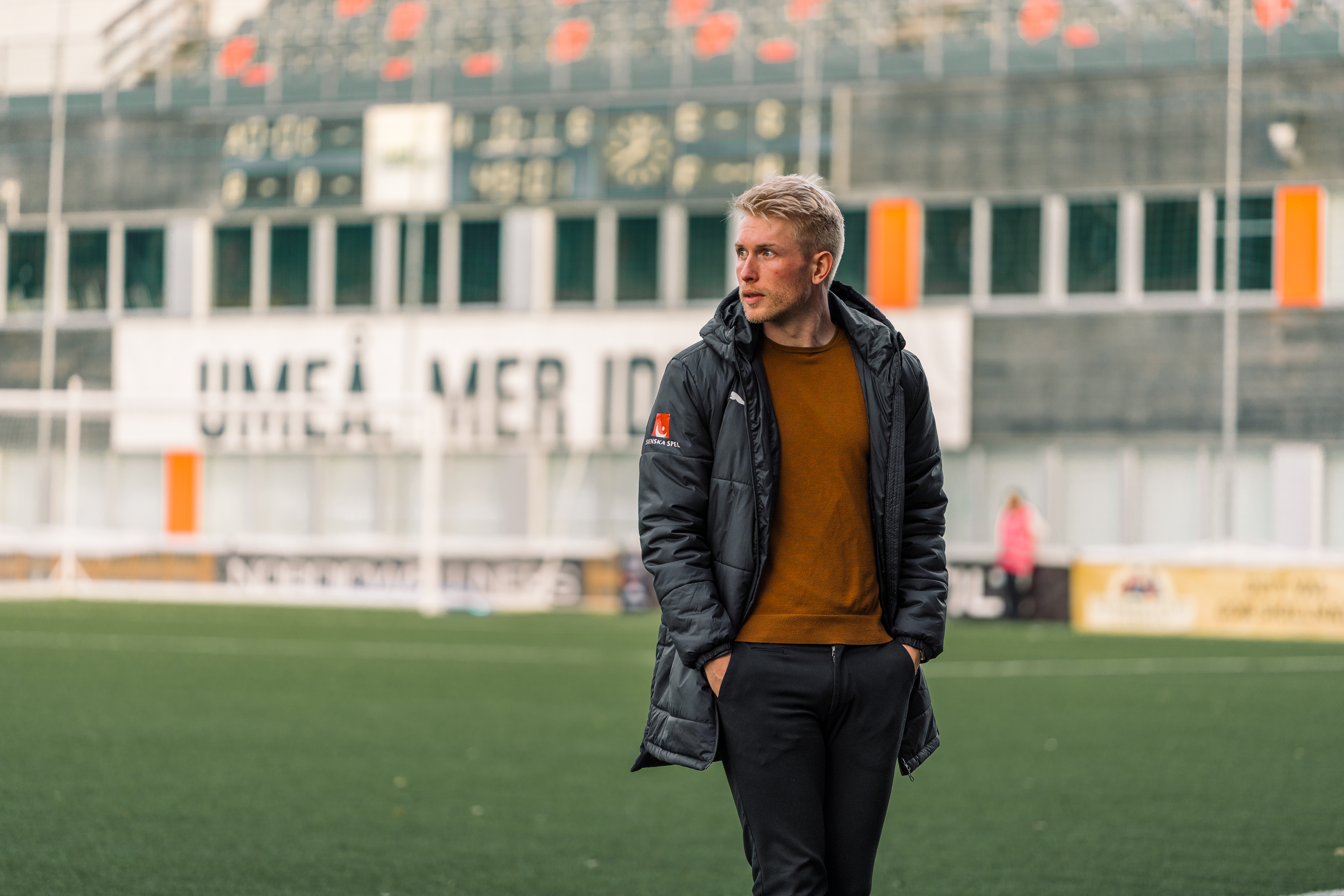
- Samuel Fagerholm during a Damallsvenskan game with Umea IK in 2022

Personal information
- Date of birth: 10 October 1992 (age 34)
- Place of birth: Finland
- Position: Defender

Senior career*
| Years | Team | Apps | (Gls) |
| 2009–2013 | FC Åland | | |
| 2011-2012 | IFK Mariehamn | 1 | (0) |
| 2014 | Täby FK | | |
| 2015-2016 | Sundbybergs IK | | |

International career^{‡}
| 2011–2015 | Åland Islands | 4 | (1) |

Managerial career
- 2018-2020: Aland United
- 2021-2022: Umea IK
- 2023: IK Uppsala
- * Club domestic league appearances and goals as of 13 September 2014 ‡ National team caps and goals as of 13 September 2014

Samuel Fagerholm (born 10 October 1992) is a Finnish football manager and a former footballer, managed Åland United in the Finnish Kansallinen Liiga, women's premier division, during the seasons of 2018-2020 where the team succeeded to win both the cup and the league during the 2020 season. He has also managed the historically successful club Umea IK in Damallsvenskan which he promoted back to the top flight during the 2021 season. He has played for FC Åland as a defender. He made one appearance in the Finnish top football division (Veikkausliiga) in 2011 for IFK Mariehamn.

== International career ==
Fagerholm played his first game with the (FIFA neither UEFA affiliated) Åland Islands team on 26 June 2011 against Saaremaa (3–3), in which he played the entire match. So far, he only featured at the 2011 edition of the Island Games.

== Honours ==
Manager

- Kansallinen Liiga 2020
- Finnish women's Cup 2020
- Elitettan 2021

Individual

- Kansallinen Liiga Coach of the Year: 2020
