= Hanna Persson =

Swedish footballer

Personal information
- Full name: Hanna Matilda Persson
- Date of birth: 26 January 1996 (age 30)
- Place of birth: Sweden
- Position: Midfielder

Team information
- Current team: Uppsala

Youth career
- Vellinge

Senior career*
Years	Team	Apps	(Gls)
2013–2017	Rosengård	10	(0)
2017–2018	Brøndby	19	(3)
2018–2019	Limhamn Bunkeflo	32	(0)
2020	Kalmar	23	(2)
2021–2022	Uppsala	51	(12)
2023–	Trelleborg	85	(21)
- * Club domestic league appearances and goals as of 14 June 2026

Hanna Persson (born 26 January 1996) is a Swedish footballer who plays as a midfielder for Elitettan club Trelleborgs FF. She previously played for Damallsvenskan clubs FC Rosengård and Limhamn Bunkeflo, Elitedivisionen club Brøndby IF, and Elitettan club IK Uppsala.

== Honours ==
Rosengård

Winner

- Damallsvenskan (3): 2013, 2014, 2015
- Svenska Supercupen: 2015

Runner-up

- Svenska Cupen: 2014–15

Brøndby

Winner

- Kvindepokalen: 2017–18

Runner-up

- Elitedivisionen: 2017–18
