= Marcus Lantz =

Swedish footballer (born 1975)

Personal information
- Date of birth: 23 October 1975 (age 50)
- Place of birth: Bromölla, Sweden
- Height: 1.78 m (5 ft 10 in)
- Position: Midfielder

Team information
- Current team: IFK Göteborg (head coach)

Senior career*
Years	Team	Apps	(Gls)
1993	IFÖ/Bromölla IF	10	(3)
1994–1999	Helsingborgs IF	92	(8)
1999	Torino	3	(0)
1999–2005	Hansa Rostock	164	(6)
2005–2007	Brøndby IF	57	(2)
2007–2010	Helsingborgs IF	75	(8)
2011–2012	Landskrona BoIS	43	(3)
Total		444	(30)

International career
1991	Sweden U17	1	(0)
1994	Sweden U19	3	(0)
1996–1997	Sweden U21	8	(3)
1998–2010	Sweden	6	(0)

Managerial career
- 2013–2017: Örgryte IS
- 2018–2019: Kopparbergs/Göteborg FC
- 2020: Mjällby AIF
- 2021: Örebro SK
- 2024: Västra Frölunda IF
- 2024–: IFK Göteborg (women)
- * Club domestic league appearances and goals

Marcus Lantz (born 23 October 1975) is a Swedish football manager and former professional footballer who played as a holding midfielder. He is the head coach of the women's team of IFK Göteborg. A full international between 1998 and 2010, he played six matches for the Sweden national team.

== Career ==
Born in Kristianstad, Lantz started playing football with amateur club IFÖ/Bromölla IF. After one season, he moved on to Helsingborgs IF in the top-flight Allsvenskan championship. He helped Helsingborg win the 1998 Svenska Cupen and 1999 Allsvenskan titles and had a trial at English club Chelsea in December 1997, before he moved abroad in the winter 1999. After a short stop at Torino F.C. in Italy, where he had limited playing time, Lantz moved to FC Hansa Rostock in the Bundesliga championship in November 1999.

He was instantly a part of the Rostock first team line-up, and in his six seasons with the club, he played 164 league matches. While at Rostock, Lantz chose to play no longer for the Sweden national team. With his contract running out in the summer 2005, he left Rostock on a free transfer. He joined Danish club Brøndby IF, under manager Michael Laudrup. In his second season with Brøndby, Lantz suffered an injury, treatment was indifferent and kept him out for two months.

He moved back to Sweden and Helsingborgs IF on 31 August 2007 and signed a contract until 2011. After his contract expired he joined Landskrona BoIS in early 2011, where he played for two seasons finishing his playing career with the 2012 season.

== Honours ==
Helsingborgs IF

- Allsvenskan: 1999
- Svenska Cupen: 1997–98, 2010
