= Åkullsjön =

Village in Robertsfors Municipality, Sweden

Coordinates: 64°16′N 20°30′E

Åkullsjön is a small village in Robertsfors Municipality, Västerbotten, Sweden. It is located about 20 km (12 mi) west of the town of Robertsfors.
