= Stensätra IF =

Swedish football club

- Full name: Stensätra Idrottsförening
- Founded: 1943
- Ground: Skogsvallen; Sandviken; Sweden
- League: Division 4 Gestrikland
Home colours	Away colours

Stensätra IF is a Swedish football club located in Sandviken.

== Background ==
Stensätra IF currently plays in Division 4 Gestrikland which is the sixth tier of Swedish football. They play their home matches at the Skogsvallen in Sandviken.

The club is affiliated to Gestriklands Fotbollförbund. Stensätra IF have competed in the Svenska Cupen on 9 occasions and have played 13 matches in the competition.

== Season to season ==
Season	Level	Division	Section	Position	Movements
1999	Tier 6	Division 5	Gästrikland	12th	Relegated
2000	Tier 7	Division 6	Gästrikland	5th	Promoted
2001	Tier 6	Division 5	Gästrikland	1st	Promoted
2002	Tier 5	Division 4	Gästrikland	6th	
2003	Tier 5	Division 4	Gästrikland	7th	
2004	Tier 5	Division 4	Gästrikland	8th	
2005	Tier 5	Division 4	Gästrikland	7th	
2006*	Tier 6	Division 4	Gästrikland	10th	
2007	Tier 6	Division 4	Gästrikland	9th	
2008	Tier 6	Division 4	Gästrikland	8th	
2009	Tier 6	Division 4	Gästrikland	7th	
2010	Tier 6	Division 4	Gästrikland	9th	
2011	Tier 6	Division 4	Gästrikland	10th	

* League restructuring in 2006 resulted in a new division being created at Tier 3 and subsequent divisions dropping a level.
