= IFK Göteborg (women) =

Football club in Gothenburg, Sweden

- Full name: Idrottsföreningen Kamraterna Göteborg (officially IFK Göteborg Fotboll)
- Nicknames: Blåvitt (Blue-white); Änglarna (The Angels); Kamraterna (The Comrades)
- Short name: IFK
- Founded: 4 October 1904; 122 years ago (club); 18 November 2019; 6 years ago (women's senior team)
- Ground: Valhalla IP, Gothenburg
- Capacity: 4,000
- Coordinates: 57°42′5.4″N 11°59′25.1″E
- Owner: Member-owned
- Chairman: Magnus Nilsson
- Head coach: Marcus Lantz
- League: Damallsvenskan
- 2026: Elitettan, 2nd of 14 (promoted)
- Website: http://www.ifkgoteborg.se/
Home colours

Idrottsföreningen Kamraterna Göteborg (officially IFK Göteborg Fotboll), commonly known as IFK Göteborg, IFK (especially locally) or simply Göteborg, is a Swedish women's football team based in Gothenburg. Founded in 2019 as part of the football club IFK Göteborg, the team plays in Division 2 Nordvästra Götaland, the 4th level of women's football in Sweden. IFK is affiliated with Göteborgs Fotbollförbund and play their home games at Valhalla IP. The club colours are blue and white, colours shared both with the sports society which the club originated from, Idrottsföreningen Kamraterna, and with the coat of arms of the city of Gothenburg.

== History ==
IFK Göteborg fielded a women's team in the late 1910s, and the first women's match in Gothenburg was played between IFK Göteborg and a combination team in 1918, even though it was more of a frivolous exhibition match than anything else. Plans to merge with Jitex BK to establish a women's team were set in motion in the 1970s, but never materialised. Activities and teams for girls were finally added to the IFK Göteborg Academy programme in 2007, and at an extra general meeting of IFK Göteborg in 2019, the club members voted to create a senior women's team, which administratively remains part of the academy.

The team started the 2020 season on the lowest level of the league pyramid with a long-term ambition of reaching the highest league, Damallsvenskan, within seven years, a previous cooperation with the senior team of Kopparbergs/Göteborg FC was ended as of this. The squad was mainly composed of players from the under-15 team of 2019. The extra general meeting also decided that the team would create its own organisation within the IFK Göteborg alliance organisation at latest on 1 January 2022.

The first competitive match of the team was played on 24 June 2020 against Ösets BK, the 6–0 victory was live-streamed by the regional newspaper Göteborgs-Posten. The run-up to the match was covered in an article in the well-respected Swedish football magazine Offside, written by a journalist playing for Ösets BK. As most players were relatively young, the team also competed in a youth league, as well as in the under-17 national championships. The team won their under-15 league twice in a row the previous years, and the immediate goal for 2020 was to advance to Division 3, a goal the team managed to meet by finishing second in the league, clinching a promotion spot. No major changes to the squad were planned for the 2021 season, and the original decision to split the women's team from the organisation by 2022 was undone by a counter-decision taken at the 2021 annual general meeting.

The 2021 season in Division 3 did not prove to be a major challenge as the team steamrolled through the league with a 66–4 goal difference, but the promotion play-offs against local rivals Örgryte IS were more dramatic. The first leg ended in a 4–4 draw as IFK scored three late goals to equalise, and at home in the second leg IFK Göteborg found themselves down 1–3 some 10 minutes into the second half. But the team again managed to both reduce and equalise, scoring the vital—due to the away goal rule being used—third goal in the 86th minute, securing promotion to Division 2 for the 2022 season.

== Stadiums ==
The home ground of the team was originally Prioritet Serneke Arena, a multi-sport complex in the district of Kviberg which includes a full-size indoor football pitch with an attendance capacity of around 3,000. Planning for the 2021 season included moving to the outdoor stadium Valhalla IP, and the home game of the promotion play-offs at the end of the season was played at Valhalla IP in front of a record crowd of 2,027. The official switch to Valhalla as home ground did not happen until the start of the 2022 season.

== Players ==
=== First-team squad ===
As of 24 July 2025

Note: Flags indicate national team as defined under FIFA eligibility rules; some limited exceptions apply. Players may hold more than one non-FIFA nationality.

No.	Pos.	Nation	Player
1	GK	SWE	Mimmi Carlsbogård
2	DF	NED	Marieke Kramer
4	DF	SWE	Nathalie Andersson
5	DF	SWE	Alice Andersson
6	MF	SWE	Wilma Lantz
7	MF	SWE	Melissa Davin
8	MF	SWE	Parva Zarassi
9	MF	SWE	Thilda Gianello
10	MF	KOS	Valentina Metaj
11	FW	SWE	Lisa Johansson
12	FW	SWE	Maja Ragnewall

No.	Pos.	Nation	Player
15	GK	SWE	Lisa Hall
16	DF	SWE	Maja Landin
17	DF	SWE	Filippa Andersson
18	FW	SWE	Leia Molund
20	MF	SWE	Saron Berhe
21	DF	SWE	Emilia Andersson
23	FW	SWE	Josan Semere Melake
24	FW	SWE	Felicia Holmberg
25	DF	SWE	Linnea Linden
—	FW	SWE	Frida Bremer
—	MF	SWE	Klara Andrup

=== Out on loan ===
As of 24 July 2025

Note: Flags indicate national team as defined under FIFA eligibility rules; some limited exceptions apply. Players may hold more than one non-FIFA nationality.

No.	Pos.	Nation	Player
30	GK	SWE	Madelein Sköld

=== Youth players with first-team experience ===
As of 24 July 2025 (Note: Current youth players who at least have played in a competitive match.)

Note: Flags indicate national team as defined under FIFA eligibility rules; some limited exceptions apply. Players may hold more than one non-FIFA nationality.

No.	Pos.	Nation	Player
—	DF	BIH	Elma Brkovic
—	DF	SWE	Tida Jatta

No.	Pos.	Nation	Player
—	MF	SWE	Emily Svantesson
—	FW	SWE	Astrid Samuelson

== Management ==
=== Board ===
As of 10 March 2026

Role	Name
Chairman	(Sweden) Magnus Nilsson
Vice chairman	(Sweden) Teresa Utković
Secretary	(Sweden) Lars Dahlström
Board members	(Sweden) Sofia Bohlin
Board members	(Sweden) Philip Haglund
Board members	(Sweden) Andrej Häggblad Hristov
Board members	(Sweden) Jessica Nauckhoff
Board members	(Sweden) Rickard Ärlig
Board members	(Sweden) Ingalill Östman

=== Organisation ===
As of 6 July 2026

Role	Name
Club director	(Sweden) Nicklas Lauwell
Operations manager	(Sweden) Sofia Hultberg
Financial manager	(Sweden) Martina Sjögren
Communications manager	(Sweden) Marcus Modéer
Head of football	(Sweden) Jesper Jansson
Sporting director	(Sweden) Peter Svanström
Director of youth academy	(Sweden) Jonas Olsson

=== Technical staff ===
As of 13 January 2026

Role	Name
Head coach	(Sweden) Marcus Lantz
Assistant coach	(Ghana) Frankie Boakye
Goalkeeping coach	(France) Louis Diolez
Coordinator	(Sweden) Eva Qvistgaard
Analyst	(Sweden) Eric Löwendahl
