= Rowan Lapi =

American soccer player (born 2001)

Personal information
- Full name: Rowan Alexandra Lapi
- Date of birth: April 16, 2001 (age 25)
- Height: 5 ft 7 in (1.70 m)
- Position: Central midfielder

Team information
- Current team: KIF Örebro
- Number: 17

Youth career
- Penn Fusion

College career
Years	Team	Apps	(Gls)
2019–2022	Northwestern Wildcats	58	(9)
2023–2024	Penn State Nittany Lions	41	(4)

Senior career*
Years	Team	Apps	(Gls)
2025–	KIF Örebro	25	(10)

Managerial career
- 2025: Northwestern Wildcats (assistant)
- * Club domestic league appearances and goals as of November 19, 2026

Rowan Alexandra Lapi (born April 16, 2001) is an American professional soccer player who plays as a midfielder for Damallsvenskan club KIF Örebro. She played college soccer for the Northwestern Wildcats and the Penn State Nittany Lions.

== Early life ==
Lapi grew up in Reinholds, a small town in Lancaster County, Pennsylvania. She played high school soccer at Cocalico High School in Denver, Pennsylvania, and played club soccer for Penn Fusion, earning DA all-conference honors.

== College career ==
Lapi played four seasons for the Northwestern Wildcats from 2019 to 2022, making 58 appearances and scoring 9 goals. She started all 17 games as a junior in 2021. She again started all 23 games and scored a career-high 6 goals as a senior in 2022, earning second-team All-Big Ten honors. In 2022, she helped the Wildcats finish second in the Big Ten, reach the Big Ten tournament semifinals, and earn their first NCAA tournament berth in five years with the highest seed in program history. She reached the NCAA tournament round of sixteen but was injured in the loss to eventual champions UCLA. After four seasons at Northwestern, she graduated with her degree in economics and retained two years of NCAA eligibility.

Lapi transferred to the Penn State Nittany Lions as a graduate student in 2023. She played in 22 games in 2023, helping the team to the Big Ten tournament semifinals and the NCAA tournament quarterfinals. She was named a team captain for her final season in 2024. She played in 19 games, starting 15, and scored 4 goals in 2024, again reaching the NCAA tournament quarterfinals. While at Penn State, she earned her Master of Business Administration and founded the clothing brand Esoteric.

== Club career ==
Swedish club KIF Örebro announced on December 19, 2024, that they had signed Lapi to her first professional contract on a one-year deal. However, before the Elitettan season began, she injured her anterior cruciate ligament (ACL) during a preseason game against AIK. On August 1, 2025, she signed a one-year extension with KIF Örebro while recovering. She also returned to the United States to serve as an assistant coach with Northwestern. She missed the entire season due to the injury.

Lapi made her professional debut in a season-opening 3–0 defeat to Elfsborg on March 28, 2026. She scored her first professional goal in a 5–1 victory over Sandviken on April 25, the third game of the season. She finished the season with 11 goals in all competitions as KIF Örebro won promotion through the playoffs winning 5–4 on aggregate against FC Rosengård, scoring in the 3–3 away leg.

== Coaching career ==
While rehabbing from her ACL injury in 2025, Lapi returned to her college team Northwestern Wildcats as an assistant coach to Michael Moynihan.

== Honors and awards ==
Individual

- Second-team All-Big Ten: 2022
