= Anneli Aarika-Szrok =

Finnish opera singer

Eini Anneli Aarika-Szrok (née Fagerholm, 18 October 1924 – 2004) was a Finnish opera singer.

Aarika-Szrok was born in October 1924 in Helsinki. She studied at the Sibelius Academy from 1944 to 1949, and then at the Franz Liszt Academy of Music in Budapest from 1949 to 1952.

She was the soloist of the Hungarian State Opera from 1951 to 1962. Aarika-Szrok worked as a singer at the Riihimäki Music Institute. She was also the executive director of the Finland-Hungary Society.

Aarika-Szrok was married to Istvan Szrok, and they had one child. She died in Helsinki in 2004.
