= IF Limhamn Bunkeflo (women) =

Swedish football club

- Full name: Ideella Föreningen Limhamn Bunkeflo 2007
- Nickname: LB07
- Founded: 1 January 2008; 18 years ago
- Ground: Limhamns IP, Malmö
- Capacity: 2,800
- Chairman: Nicklas Larsson
- Head Coach: Renée Slegers
- League: Division 3 Dam Sydvästra Skåne
- 2018: 10th
- Website: http://www.lb07.com/
Home colours	Away colours

IF Limhamn Bunkeflo 07, commonly known as LB07, is a football club based in Malmö, Sweden. It is the biggest football club from the Scania region. The club is affiliated with Skånes Fotbollförbund and play their home games at Limhamns IP. The club colours, reflected in their crest and kit, are red and white. The club promoted to the second level of Swedish women's football in 2011 (which later became known as the Elitettan). They did this by winning against IF Norvalla (5–0) and losing to Mallbackens IF with a small goal difference (2–3) in the final promotion group. For five years after the promotion LB07 continued playing in the Elitettan.

In 2016, they won the league championship and gained promotion to the top level Damallsvenskan. The club has an associated men's team who play in the lower categories.

== Squad ==
As of 9 April 2019

Note: Flags indicate national team as defined under FIFA eligibility rules; some limited exceptions apply. Players may hold more than one non-FIFA nationality.

No.	Pos.	Nation	Player
3	DF	SWE	Malin Winberg
4	DF	SWE	Elin Björklund
12	FW	SWE	Johanna Olsson

No.	Pos.	Nation	Player
14	MF	USA	Erin Gunther
15	FW	SWE	Mia Persson (captain)
16	MF	SWE	Elina Lenir
17	MF	USA	Dallas Dorosy
18	FW	SWE	Lisa Lang-Nilsson
19	DF	SWE	Rebecka Persson
20	FW	SWE	Jennie Egeriis
21	MF	FRA	Doriane Pau
22	MF	SWE	Hanna Persson
23	MF	SWE	Emma Paulsson
24	DF	SWE	Saga Ollerstam
26	GK	ALB	Meriem Isa
30	GK	SWE	Chandra Bednar

== Technical staff ==
As of December 2018

Name	Role
(Netherlands) Renée Slegers	Head coach
(Sweden) Ola Tidman	Goalkeeping Coach

== Honours ==
- Elitettan (Tier 2)
  - Winners: 2016
