= Gamla Upsala SK =

Swedish football club

- Full name: Gamla Upsala Sportklubb
- Nickname(s): GUSK
- Founded: 24 April 1947
- Ground: Lötens IP; Uppsala; Sweden
- Capacity: 1,000
- Chairman: Åsa Sandgren Åkerman
- League: Division 3 Norra Svealand
- 2024: Division 3 Norra Svealand, 4th of 12
Home colours

Gamla Upsala SK is a Swedish football club located in Uppsala.

== Background ==
Since their foundation on 24 April 1947 Gamla Upsala SK has participated mainly in the middle and lower divisions of the Swedish football league system. The club currently plays in Division 2 Norra Svealand which is the fourth tier of Swedish football. They play their home matches at the Lötens IP in Uppsala.

The club developed strong roots with Gamla Upsala (Old Upsala) in its early years and afterwards with the northeastern part of the municipality of Uppsala. Football has been the dominant sport for GUSK but the club has also specialised in table tennis, cross-country skiing, bandy and floorball.

Gamla Upsala SK are affiliated to the Upplands Fotbollförbund.

== Season to season ==
| Season | Level | Division | Section | Position | Movements |
|---|---|---|---|---|---|
| 1993 | Tier 5 | Division 4 | Uppland | 2nd | |
| 1994 | Tier 5 | Division 4 | Uppland/Gotland | 7th | |
| 1995 | Tier 5 | Division 4 | Uppland | 2nd | Promotion Playoffs |
| 1996 | Tier 5 | Division 4 | Uppland | 1st | Promoted |
| 1997 | Tier 4 | Division 3 | Norra Svealand | 10th | Relegated |
| 1998 | Tier 5 | Division 4 | Uppland Norra Vår | 3rd | Spring Competition |
| | Tier 5 | Division 4 | Uppland/Gotland Höst | 1st | Autumn Competition – Promoted |
| 1999 | Tier 4 | Division 3 | Norra Svealand | 10th | Relegated |
| 2000 | Tier 5 | Division 4 | Uppland Västra | 4th | Spring Competition |
| | Tier 5 | Division 4 | Uppland/Gotland Höst | 1st | Autumn Competition – Promoted |
| 2001 | Tier 4 | Division 3 | Norra Svealand | 5th | |
| 2002 | Tier 4 | Division 3 | Norra Svealand | 4th | |
| 2003 | Tier 4 | Division 3 | Norra Svealand | 1st | Promoted |
| 2004 | Tier 3 | Division 2 | Östra Svealand | 8th | |
| 2005 | Tier 3 | Division 2 | Norra Svealand | 12th | Relegated |
| 2006* | Tier 5 | Division 3 | Norra Svealand | 4th | |
| 2007 | Tier 5 | Division 3 | Norra Svealand | 3rd | |
| 2008 | Tier 5 | Division 3 | Norra Svealand | 1st | Promoted |
| 2009 | Tier 4 | Division 2 | Norra Svealand | 4th | |
| 2010 | Tier 4 | Division 2 | Norra Svealand | 6th | |
| 2011 | Tier 4 | Division 2 | Norra Svealand | 3rd | |
| 2012 | Tier 4 | Division 2 | Norra Svealand | 9th | |
| 2013 | Tier 4 | Division 2 | Norra Svealand | | |

* League restructuring in 2006 resulted in a new division being created at Tier 3 and subsequent divisions dropping a level.
