= Vångavallen =

Sports ground in Trelleborg, Sweden

Coordinates: 55°23′6.54″N 13°9′39.54″E

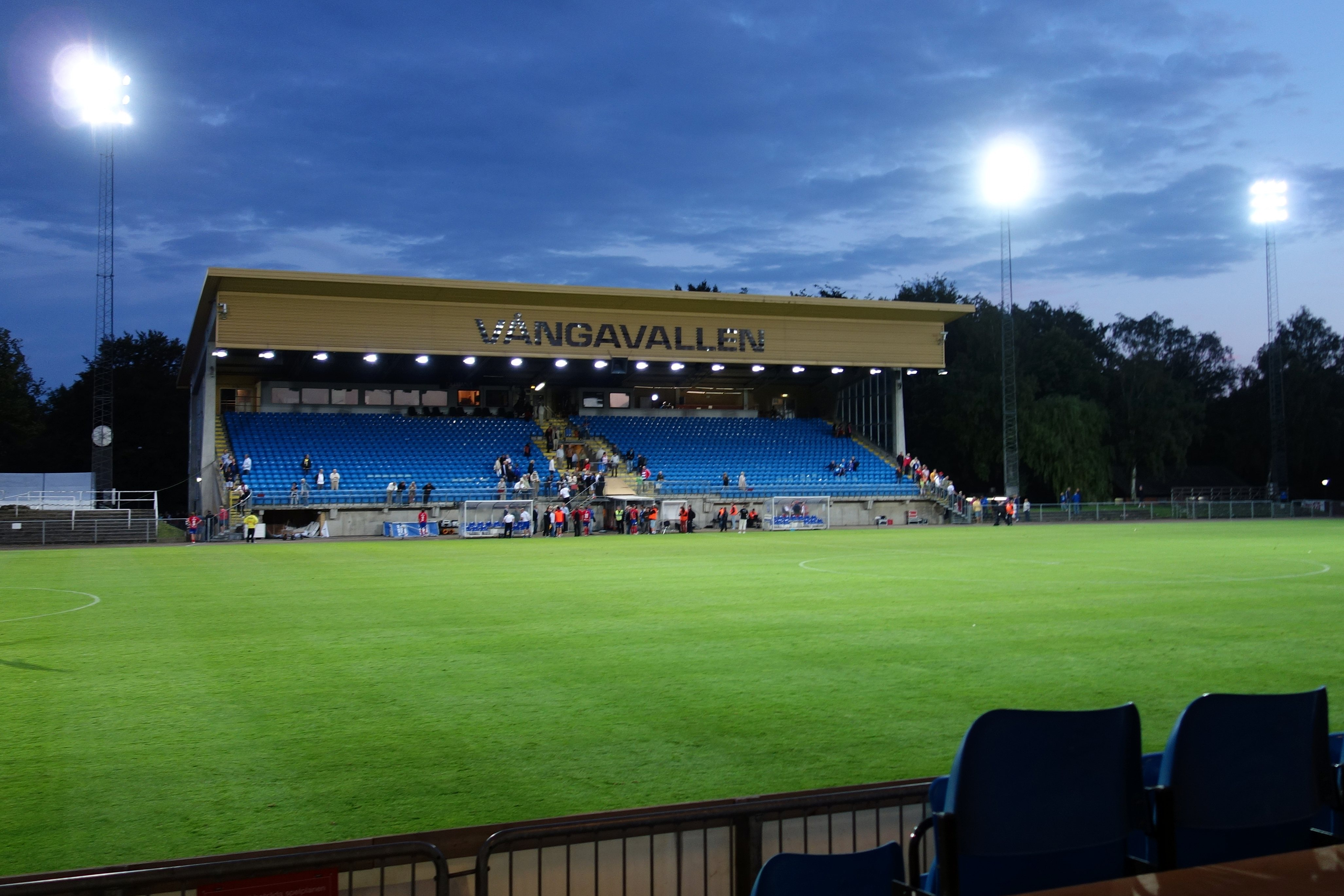
- Vångavallen under floodlights
- Interactive map of Vångavallen
- Location: Trelleborg, Sweden
- Capacity: 7,357 (~3000 seated)
- Type: sports ground
- Surface: Grass
- Record attendance: 9,843, Trelleborgs FF – Malmö FF 2004

Construction
- Opened: 5 June 1933
- Renovated: 2001

Tenant
- Trelleborgs FF

Vångavallen is a multi-purpose stadium in Trelleborg, Sweden. It is currently used mostly for football matches and is the home stadium of Trelleborgs FF. The stadium was opened on 5 June 1933. It has a capacity of 7,400 spectators, 3,000 of which is seated.
