= Bollstanäs SK =

Swedish football club

- Full name: Bollstanäs Sportklubb
- Nickname: BSK
- Founded: 1922; 104 years ago
- Ground: Bollstanäs IP; Upplands Väsby; Sweden
- Head coach: Oscar Braniff; Thomas Lind
- Coach: Tommy Flemström; Robin Hildeland
- League: Superettan
- 2023: 11th
- Website: Official website
Home colours	Away colours

Bollstanäs SK is a Swedish professional football club located in Upplands Väsby in Stockholm County.

== Background ==
Bollstanäs Sportklubb was formed in May 1922 and is one of the largest sports clubs in the Greater Stockholm area running a total of 93 teams (82 of which are youth teams) in football, basketball, handball and bandy. The first sections were basketball for girls and football for boys. The club has around 2,000 members and the current breakdown of teams is as follows:

Men's Football

- 27 youth teams
- 2 senior teams

Women's Football

- 11 youth teams
- 3 senior teams

Basketball

- 16 youth teams
- 2 senior teams

Handball

- 13 youth teams
- 2 senior teams

Bandy

- 14 youth teams
- 2 senior teams

Since their foundation Bollstanäs SK has participated mainly in the middle and lower divisions of the Swedish football league system. The club currently plays in Division 3 Norra Svealand which is the fifth tier of Swedish football. They play their home matches at the Bollstanäs IP in Upplands Väsby.

Bollstanäs SK are affiliated to Stockholms Fotbollförbund.

== Recent history ==
In recent seasons Bollstanäs SK have competed in the following divisions:

2011 – Division III, Norra Svealand
2010 – Division III, Norra Svealand
2009 – Division III, Norra Svealand
2008 – Division IV, Stockholm Norra
2007 – Division IV, Stockholm Norra
2006 – Division III, Norra Svealand
2005 – Division II, Östra Svealand
2004 – Division III, Norra Svealand
2003 – Division III, Norra Svealand
2002 – Division III, Norra Svealand
2001 – Division III, Norra Svealand
2000 – Division IV, Stockholm Norra
1999 – Division IV, Stockholm Norra

== Attendances ==
In recent seasons Bollstanäs SK have had the following average attendances:

Season	Average attendance	Division / Section	Level
2005	223	Div 2 Östra Svealand	Tier 3
2006	139	Div 3 Norra Svealand	Tier 5
2007	Not available	Div 4 Stockholm Norra	Tier 6
2008	Not available	Div 4 Stockholm Norra	Tier 6
2009	261	Div 3 Norra Svealand	Tier 5
2010	168	Div 3 Norra Svealand	Tier 5
2011	259	Div 3 Norra Svealand	Tier 5

* Attendances are provided in the Publikliga sections of the Svenska Fotbollförbundet website.
