= KIF Örebro DFF =

- Full name: Karlslunds Idrottsförening Örebro Damfotbollsförening
- Founded: 1980; 46 years ago
- Ground: Behrn Arena; Örebro, Sweden
- Capacity: 12,640
- Club director: Elin Stengarn
- Head coach: Fredrik Andersson
- League: Elitettan
- 2025: 3rd of 14
- Website: http://www.kiforebro.se/
Home colours	Away colours

KIF Örebro DFF is a Swedish women's football club based in Örebro. Founded in 1980 as the women's football section of multi-sports association Karlslunds IF, the club's first team currently plays in the Elitettan, the second-highest level of the women's football pyramid in Sweden. The club also operates two reserve teams at the under-19 and under-17 levels, as well as a youth academy.

KIF Örebro play their home games at Behrn Arena, which they share with the men's football club Örebro SK.

== History ==
Karlslunds IF, founded in 1920, took up women's football in 1980. By the 2005 season, they became known as KIF Örebro DFF.

Under manager Richard Holmlund, KIF Örebro won the 2010 Svenska Cupen.

In 2014, the first team enjoyed their best ever season, finishing second in the league and qualifying for the UEFA Women's Champions League for the first time in club history.

== Players and staff ==
=== First-team squad ===
As of 8 May 2024.

Note: Flags indicate national team as defined under FIFA eligibility rules; some limited exceptions apply. Players may hold more than one non-FIFA nationality.

No.	Pos.	Nation	Player
1	GK	SWE	Clara Ekstrand
3	DF	ISL	Áslaug Dóra Sigurbjörnsdóttir
5	DF	SWE	Amanda Altheden
7	FW	SWE	Ronja Karlsson Törnborg
8	MF	SWE	Wilma Öhman
9	MF	FIN	Inka Sarjanoja
10	FW	NOR	Nora Håheim
11	DF	SWE	Molly Johansson
12	FW	SWE	Ida Björnberg
14	MF	ISL	Bergþóra Sól Ásmundsdóttir

No.	Pos.	Nation	Player
16	DF	ISL	Katla María Þórðardóttir
17	DF	SWE	Ebba Cabander
18	DF	SWE	Beatrice Gärds
19	MF	FIN	Minea Lassas (captain)
20	FW	SWE	Lisa Frisk
22	DF	USA	Ashley Barron
25	GK	SWE	Elin Ekmark
43	GK	SWE	Saga Andersson
88	FW	SWE	Maja Bodin
—	MF	FIN	Wilma Sjöholm

==== Former players ====
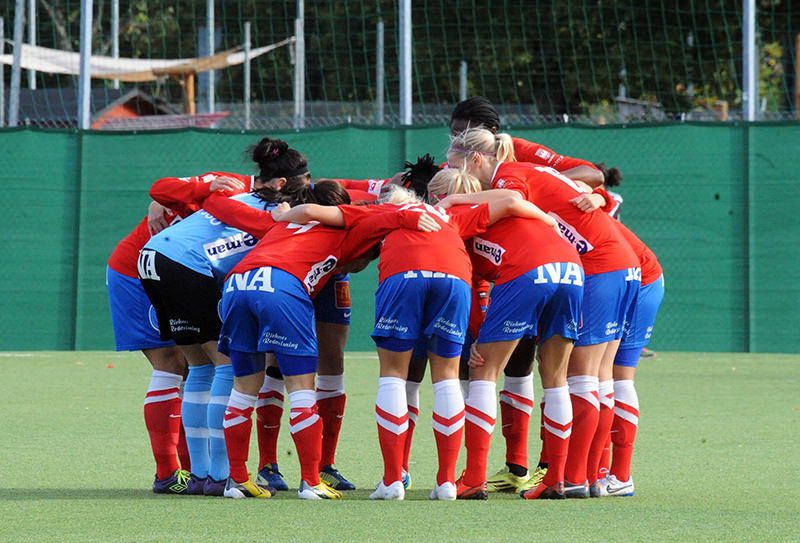
Before a match in September 2014

Notable former players include Americans Kristine Lilly, Kate Markgraf, and Christie Welsh; they played for the club in 2004 under Pia Sundhage.

=== Coaching staff ===
As of 28 March 2025.

Position	Name
Sports director	Jonas Nilsson
Head coach	Fredrik Andersson
Assistant coach	Tim Gladh
Assistant coach	Rickard Nilsson
Goalkeeper coach	Oskar Klasson
Fitness coach	Linus Andersson
Team coordinator	Björn Sundström
Physiotherapist	Mi Borg
Physiotherapist	Olivia Puhls

== Record in UEFA Women's Champions League ==
All results (away, home and aggregate) list Örebro's goal tally first.

Competition	Round	Club	Away	Home	Aggregate
2015–2016	Round of 32	(Greece) PAOK Thessaloniki	3–0 ^{a}	5–0	8–0
2015–2016	Round of 16	(France) Paris Saint-Germain	0–0	1–1 ^{a}	1–1 (agr)

^{a} First leg.
