= Eyravallen =

Swedish football stadium

Coordinates: 59°15′58″N 15°13′23″E

- Behrn Arena
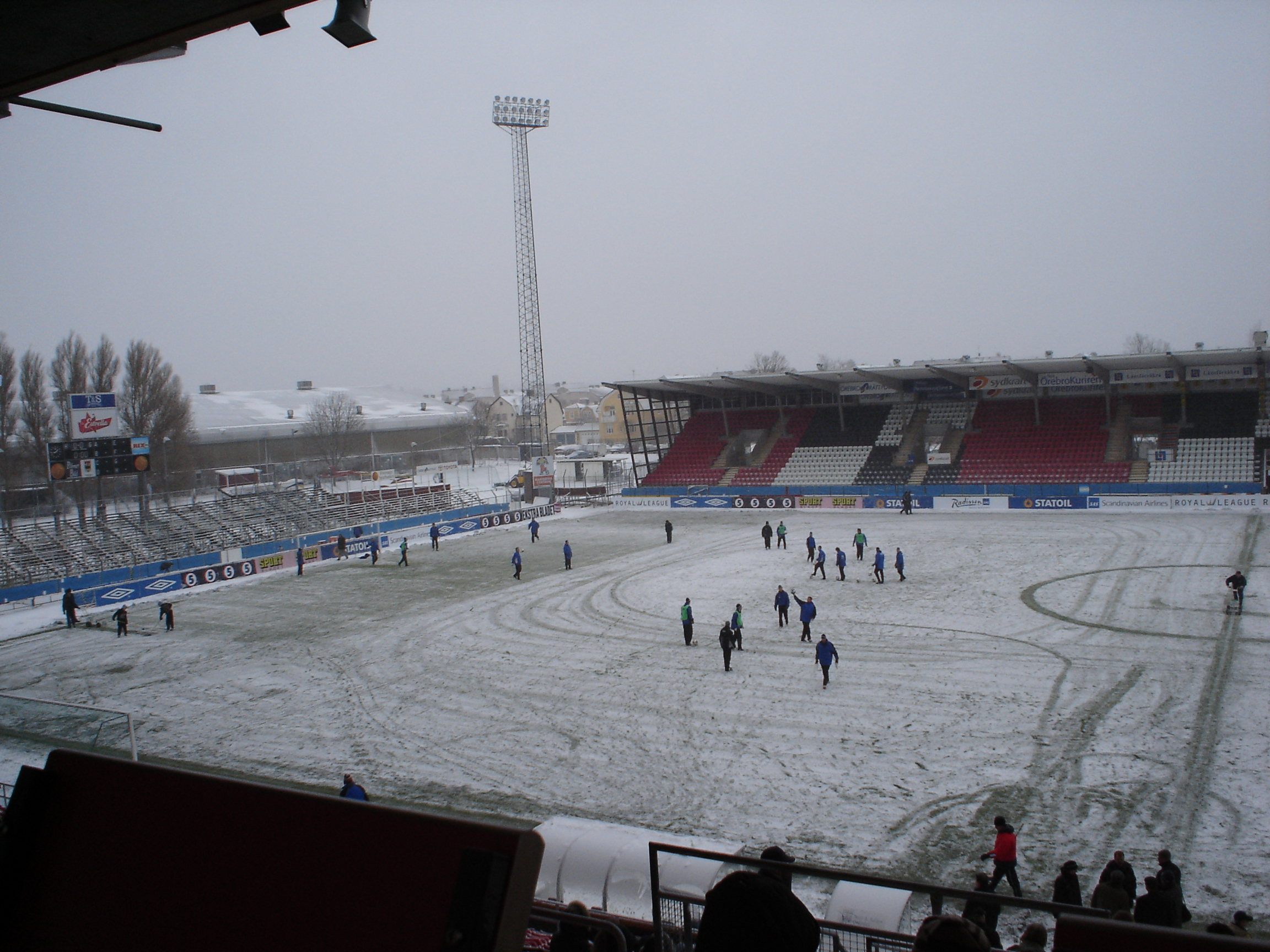
- Interactive map of Eyravallen
- Location: Restalundsvägen 4-6, Örebro, Sweden
- Capacity: 12,645
- Surface: Artificial turf
- Record attendance: 12,523 (against HIF 13/05/18)

Construction
- Opened: 26 August 1923

Tenants
- Örebro SK; KIF Örebro DFF; Örebro Black Knights

Eyravallen, currently known as Behrn Arena for sponsorship reasons, is a football stadium in Örebro, Sweden and home stadium for Örebro SK in Swedish second division Superettan. The stadium holds 12,645 people and was built in 1923. The stadium underwent renovation between 2003 and 2009.

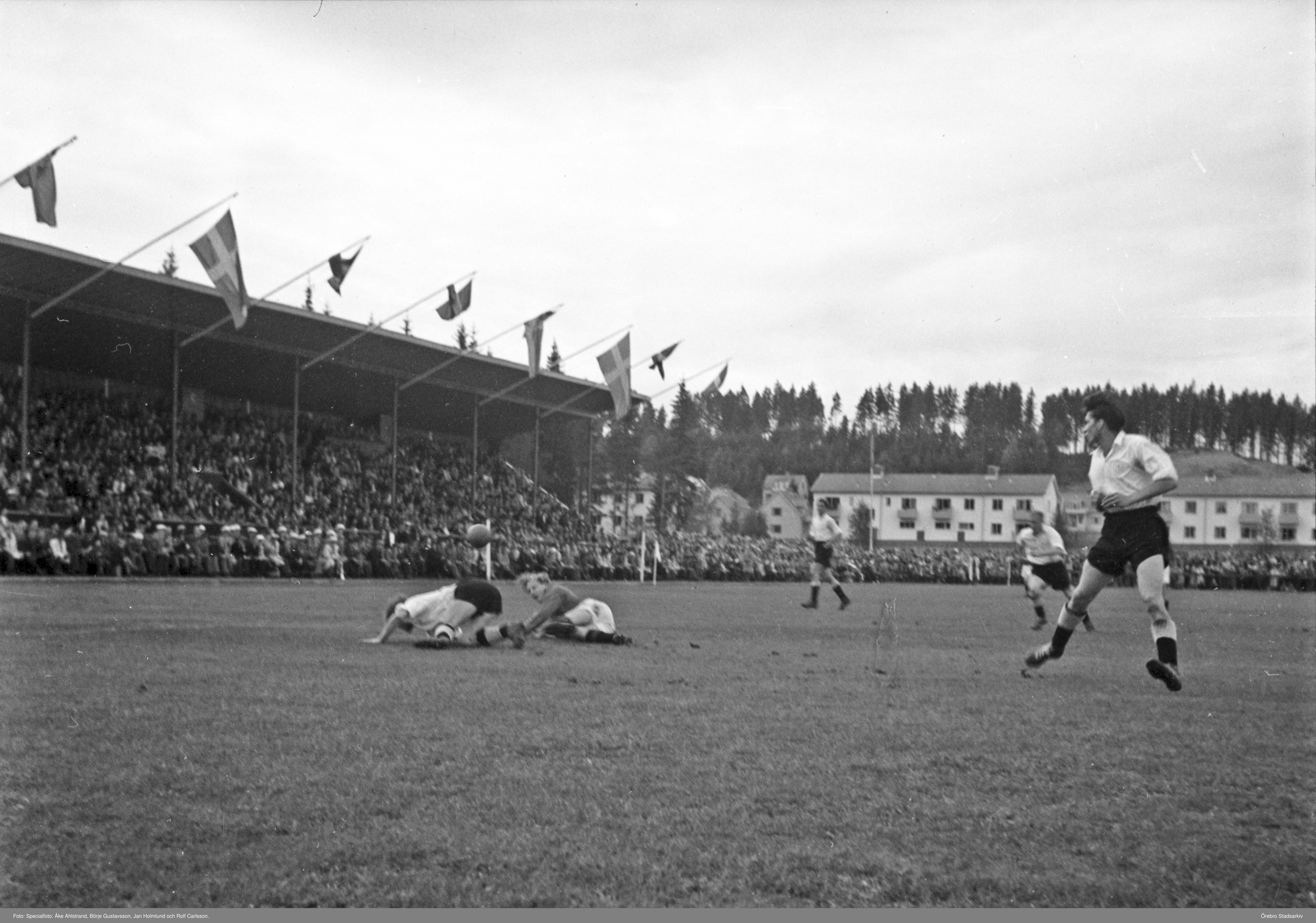
Eyravallen in 1946 during a game between Örebro SK and Degerfors IF.

The attendance record at the arena was against the local rival of Degerfors IF having 20,066 people watching the game 8 June 1961, and the record in the modern-day arena is 12,523 being during the game against Hammarby IF, on 13 May 2018.

The stadium's grass is astroturf since 2003, and Örebro was the first top-flight club in Sweden to have that playing surface. This was in part due to the harsher winters in Örebro compared to coastal and further southern areas.

Football club KIF Örebro and American football club Örebro Black Knights also became tenants of the stadium.

== Stands ==
- North stand built 2003. 4,000 seats + a gondol stand with 250 seats, all under roof.
  - Two restaurants, one pub and several business stores.
- South stand built 1974. 3,000 seats under roof.
- West stand built 2007. 4,350 standing people.
- East stand built 2009 is a mixed standing and seating stand, with 1,600 for standing and 1,300 seats.

== See also ==
- List of football stadiums in Sweden
- Lists of stadiums
