= Elitettan =

Swedish football league

- Founded: 2013
- Country: Sweden
- Confederation: UEFA (Europe)
- Number of clubs: 14
- Level on pyramid: 2
- Promotion to: Damallsvenskan
- Relegation to: Division 1
- Domestic cup: Svenska Cupen
- Current champions: Eskilstuna United DFF (2025)
- Most championships: AIK (2 titles); Umeå IK (2 titles); Växjö DFF (2 titles)
- Website: https://www.elitettan.se/
- Current: 2026 Elitettan

Elitettan (Swedish: [ɛˈliːtˌɛtːan], lit. 'The Elite First') is the second highest division of Swedish women's football. Contested by 14 clubs, it operates on a system of promotion and relegation with Damallsvenskan and Division 1. Seasons run from April to October, with teams playing 26 matches each in the season. The league was created in 2013.

== Current clubs ==
Locations of teams in the 2025 Elitettan.

| Team | Home city | Home ground | Capacity^{a} |
|---|---|---|---|
| Bollstanäs SK | Upplands Väsby | Bollstanäs IP | 1,000 |
| Eskilstuna United DFF | Eskilstuna | Tunavallen | 7,800 |
| Jitex BK | Mölndal | Åbyvallen | 1,500 |
| IFK Kalmar | Kalmar | Gröndals IP | 1,500 |
| Lidköpings FK | Lidköping | Framnäs IP | 2,500 |
| Mallbackens IF | Lysvik | Strandvallen | 2,000 |
| KIF Örebro DFF | Örebro | Behrn Arena | 12,624 |
| Örebro SK | Örebro | Eyravallen | 12,645 |
| Sundsvalls DFF | Sundsvall | NP3 Arena | 8,000 |
| Sunnanå SK | Skellefteå | Norrvalla IP | 1,500 |
| Trelleborgs FF | Trelleborg | Vångavallen | 7,400 |
| Umeå IK | Umeå | Umeå Energi Arena | 6,000 |
| IK Uppsala Fotboll | Uppsala | Studenternas IP | 10,522 |
| Gamla Upsala SK | Uppsala | Lötens IP | 2,500 |

== Promoted teams ==
| Season | Champions | Runners-up |
|---|---|---|
| 2013 | Eskilstuna United | AIK |
| 2014 | Mallbackens IF | Hammarby IF |
| 2015 | Kvarnsvedens IK | Djurgårdens IF |
| 2016 | IF Limhamn Bunkeflo | Hammarby IF |
| 2017 | Växjö DFF | IFK Kalmar |
| 2018 | Kungsbacka | KIF Örebro |
| 2019 | Umeå IK | IK Uppsala |
| 2020 | AIK | Hammarby IF |
| 2021 | Umeå IK | IFK Kalmar |
| 2022 | Växjö DFF | IFK Norrköping |
| 2023 | AIK | Trelleborgs FF |
| 2024 | Malmö FF | Alingsås IF |
| 2025 | Eskilstuna United | IK Uppsala |
