= IK Uppsala Fotboll =

Swedish women's association football club

- Full name: Idrottsklubben Uppsala Fotboll
- Founded: 2016; 10 years ago
- Ground: Studenternas IP
- Capacity: 1,500
- President: Linda Zillén
- Coach: Jonas Valfridsson
- League: Damallsvenskan
- 2025: ▲2nd, Elitettan (promotion)
- Website: https://www.uppsalafotboll.se/
Home colours

IK Uppsala Fotboll is a football club from Uppsala, in Uppsala County, Sweden. The club was established in 2016 when IK Sirius Fotboll's women's department decided to reform as an independent club. It was promoted into the women's Premier Division (Damallsvenskan) for the first time in 2020.

The club play their home games at Studenternas IP in Uppsala. The team colours are dark red and white. The club is affiliated to the Upplands Fotbollförbund.

On 5 December 2022, the Swedish Football Association announced that Eskilstuna United DFF club was denied for failing to fulfill economic requirements, and weren't allowed to play the 2023 Damallsvenskan and instead were relegated to Elitettan. Eskilstuna United DFF appealed, but on 2 January 2023, the Swedish Football Association announced that instead, IK Uppsala would be promoted.

== Personnel ==
Updated as of 3 August 2022.

=== Current technical staff ===
Position	Name
Head coach	(Sweden) Jonas Valfridsson
Assistant coach	(Sweden) Rikard Östergren
Mental coach	(Sweden) Ingemar Persson
Goalkeeper coach	(Sweden) Jonas Bylund
Physiotherapist	(Sweden) Hampus Ågren
Trainer	(Sweden) Jonatan Berg
Team leader	(Sweden) Håkan Sandberg

== Current squad ==
As of 7 July 2026.

Note: Flags indicate national team as defined under FIFA eligibility rules; some limited exceptions apply. Players may hold more than one non-FIFA nationality.

No.	Pos.	Nation	Player
1	GK	FIN	Matilda Nurmi
2	DF	SWE	Arsema Weldai
3	DF	SWE	Ellen Andersson
4	DF	SWE	Clara Flenhagen
5	DF	SWE	Maja Wangerheim (on loan from Kristianstads)
5	DF	SWE	Sofia From
6	MF	SWE	Tekla Höckert
7	DF	SWE	Josefin Baudou
8	MF	FIN	Olivia Mattsson
9	MF	SWE	Clara Leffler
10	FW	SWE	Elin Flakberg
11	MF	SWE	Sonja Ekholm
12	MF	SWE	Amanda Sundström
14	MF	SWE	Angelina Klingberg
15	MF	SWE	Lova Tomic

No.	Pos.	Nation	Player
16	MF	SWE	Hedvig Karlsson
20	DF	SWE	Fanny Öhngren
21	MF	SWE	Stina Leffler
22	DF	SWE	Agnes Ahlsson
23	MF	SWE	Alva Johansson
24	MF	SWE	Thindra Mattsson
25	MF	SWE	Alva Karlsson
26	MF	SWE	Meja Blomkvist
27	DF	SWE	Martina Leon Andersson
28	GK	SWE	Tindra Gustavson
28	MF	SWE	Filipa Edberg

=== Former players ===
For details of current and former players, see Category:IK Uppsala Fotboll players.
