= Swedish county road 190 =

Road in Sweden

Swedish county road 190 (Swedish: Länsväg 190) is a Swedish county road in the province Västra Götalands län in Sweden. The road is 71 kilometres long.

== Places along the road ==
- Hjällbo
- Angered
- Rågården
- Torvhög
- Bergum
- Olofstorp
- Gråbo
- Björboholm
- Sjövik
- Gräfsnäs
- Sollebrunn
- Stora Mellby
- Nossebro
