= Alingsås =

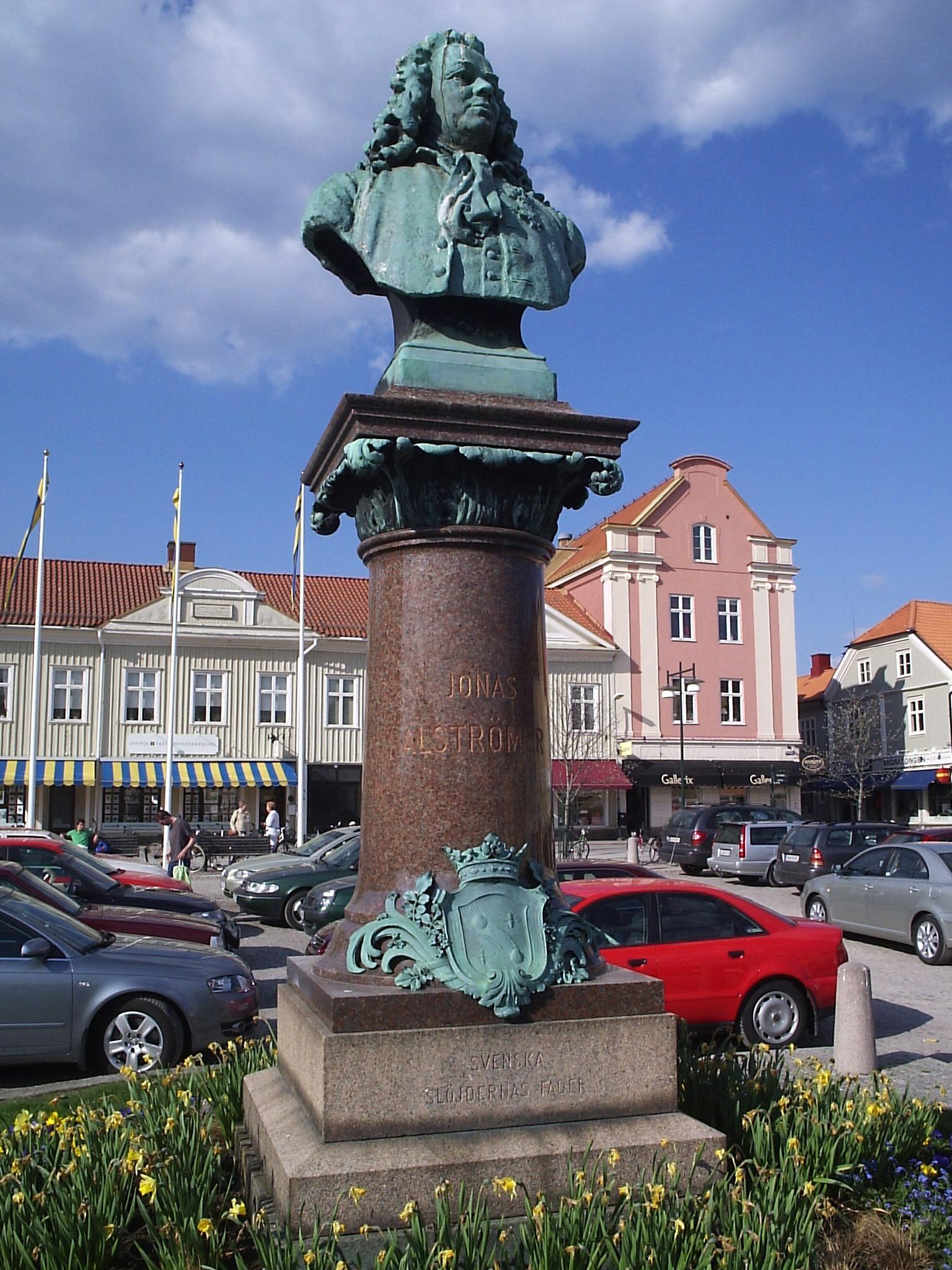
- Statue of Jonas Alströmer located at "Stora Torget" in Alingsås.

- Location within Västra Götaland Location within Sweden
- Coordinates: 57°55′48″N 12°31′59″E
- Country: Sweden
- Province: Västergötland
- County: Västra Götaland County
- Municipality: Alingsås Municipality
- Established: 1619

Area
  - City: 12.3523 km^{2} (4.7692 sq mi)
- Elevation: 66 m (217 ft)

Population (31 December 2010)
  - City: 24,482
  - Density: 1,982/km^{2} (5,130/sq mi)
  - Urban: 38,509
- Time zone: UTC+1 (CET)
  - Summer (DST): UTC+2 (CEST)
- Postal code: 441 xx
- Area code: (+46) 322
- Website: Official website

Alingsås (Swedish pronunciation: [alɪŋˈsoːs]) is a locality and the seat of Alingsås Municipality in Västra Götaland County, Sweden. It had 24,482 inhabitants in 2010.

== Geography ==
Geographically the city is situated by the outlet of the small rivulet Säveån into lake Mjörn. Transportation links are provided by the western main line railway (Västra stambanan) between Stockholm and Gothenburg, and by motorway through the European route E20. Next to Alingsås you can also find a small village called Sollebrunn.

== History ==
Alingsås was founded as inhabitants from the city Nya Lödöse were made homeless as Danish troops burnt it down. Gustavus Adolphus granted Alingsås its Royal Charter in 1619, which makes it older than Västra Götaland's largest city Gothenburg (which was granted its charter in 1621).

Among its historical inhabitants is Jonas Alströmer, who was born in Alingsås in 1685. Alströmer is credited for introducing the potato plant to Sweden. He also established a large scale draper's industry there, which before long became Sweden's largest. However, some too-optimistic calculations, devastating fires and political setbacks finally forced its closure in 1779.

In April 2021, archaeologists announced the discovery of 2,500-year-old Bronze Age ornaments which can be related with a woman of high status. Some of the necklaces, chains and pins, discovered by chance by the cartographer Tomas Karlsson, are very well preserved.

== Historical sites ==
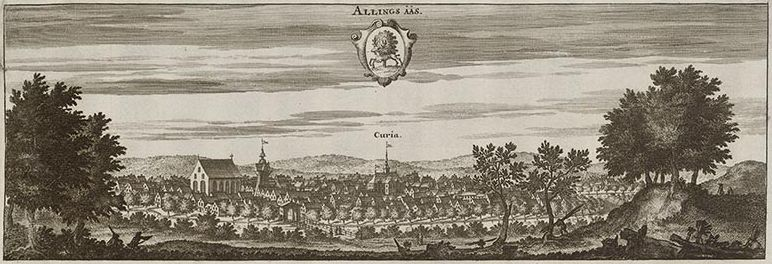
Alingsås c. 1700 in Suecia antiqua et hodierna.

In different locations in Alingsås you can find several large potholes carved in the rock. These are called Giant's Kettles, and can vary a lot in size and depth. The biggest ones are in Brobacka, which is located on the way to Gräfsnäs. The Giant's Kettles are common visiting sites for secondary school classes.

Gräfsnäs slottsruin is a castle ruin located by the lake Anten, just outside Alingsås. It was built in 1550 by Count Sten Eriksson Leijonhufvud, who already owned a castle on the other side of the lake, in Loholmen. After Eriksson's death, 1568, his wife Ebba Månsson Leijonhufvud took care of the castle, and it would stay in the family until 1724. In 1634 the castle burnt to the ground, but was rebuilt as a magnificent castle in late renaissance style. In 1734 it burned down again, but the owner at that time rebuilt it to match what it had been. In 1834, exactly two hundred years after it had burnt for the first time, the castle was sold to Otto Ulfsparre for 110 000 barrels of schnapps. The day that the papers on the purchase were to be signed, the castle burnt - for the third time, with exactly 100 years between each of the three occasions. The last person to make the castle his permanent home was fisherman Nils Andersson, who paid his rent in fish. After his death, the roof was eventually removed to prevent the partying that the youths in the village were doing in the old castle. In 1911 the castle was restored by Västergötland-Göteborgs Järnvägs AB, and since 1930 it is cared for by Alingsås Municipality. Alingsås museum was founded in 1928, and contains memorial collections of photographs and the municipal archives, as well as hosting several exhibitions. It has been closed to the public since spring 2010, due to rearrangement with the premises.

== Culture ==
Alingsås is known for its cafes, 26 in total (in 2010), and is often called "The Capital of Fika". Three of the cafes are included in the White Guide.

Karin Boye, a Swedish writer, committed suicide in a forest in the Alingsås city district of Nolby in 1941. The place is now a memorial, and a popular visiting site for schoolclasses, taking the "Karin Boye tour".

Alingsås has an art gallery, libraries and a museum.

== Yearly events ==
Alingsås has a rich cultural life, and hosts a few different cultural events throughout the year. In October, Lights in Alingsås is held for one month; 6 European lighting designers get to light up selected sections of the city as they please. To help them, they get about 65 international students of architecture, and together they have one week to create the vision of the lightning designers, who act as workshop leaders. The public can then either walk the tour themselves or in guided groups, and it has over the years become very popular internationally. The project is a cooperation between Alingsås Kommun and Professional Lighting Designers' Association since 2000.

In the summer, a festival is hosted by Alingsås Kommun, called Potatisfestivalen (the Potato Festival). It is a city festival with different activities, such as concerts and performances.

== Education ==
- Alströmergymnasiet - high school

== Sports ==
Alingsås has several sports associations. Swimming, figure skating, ice hockey, track and field, orienteering, soccer, handball and floorball are some of the more popular sports. There are two health centres, which host different types of group training as well as providing training machines.

Alingsås HK, the handball association of Alingsås, yearly hosts a tournament where teams from all over the country can join and play against each other. It is, according to the city's history and nickname, called Potatiscupen (the potato tournament). The teams use the different schools in the area for accommodation.

Alingsås IF's women's team is the town's most reputable football club. The team currently competes in the Elitettan, the Swedish second tier of women's football below the Damallsvenskan.

Two men's football clubs also exist in the city, Holmalunds IF and Alingsås IF, both competing in the regional Division 3 Mellersta Götaland, in the fifth tier of Swedish football.

== City districts ==
- Hjälmared
- Röhult
- Rosendal
- Dammhultet
- Västra Ängabo
- Östra Ängabo
- Gråbo
- Dammen
- Prästeryd
- Klinten
- Hjortgården
- Alefors
- Grimsholmen
- Nolby Kapell
- Kristineholm
- Holmalund
- Stampen
- Brogården
- Nolby
- Noltorp
- Enehagen
- Tegelbruket
- Nolhaga
- Sörhaga
- Kulingsberg
- Alfhem
- Lövekulle
- Eriksberg
- Mariedal
- Stadsskogen

== Other ==
There is a Unisys data center here.
