= Giant's kettle =

Hole drilled in the rock by eddy currents of water bearing gravel

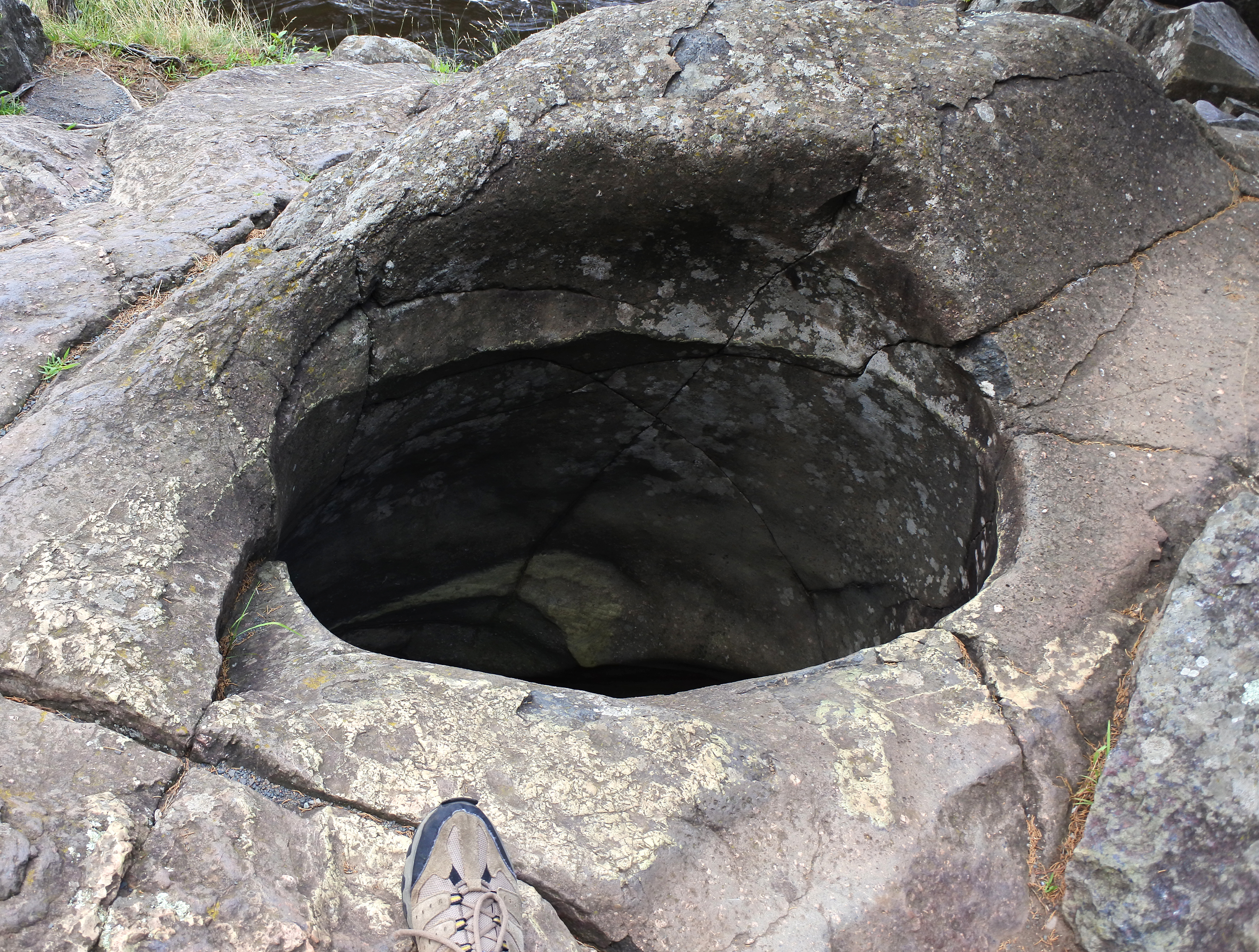
Glacial pothole in Taylors Falls on the St. Croix River at Interstate State Park, Minnesota, U.S.

A giant's kettle, also known as either a giant's cauldron, moulin pothole, or glacial pothole, is a typically large and cylindrical pothole drilled in solid rock underlying a glacier either by water descending down a deep moulin or by gravel rotating in the bed of subglacial meltwater stream. The interiors of potholes tend to be smooth and regular, unlike a plunge pool.

== Formation ==
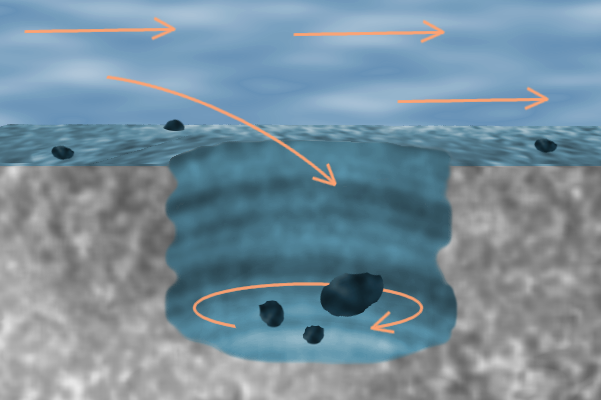
Illustration of a giant's kettle being formed by rotating gravel

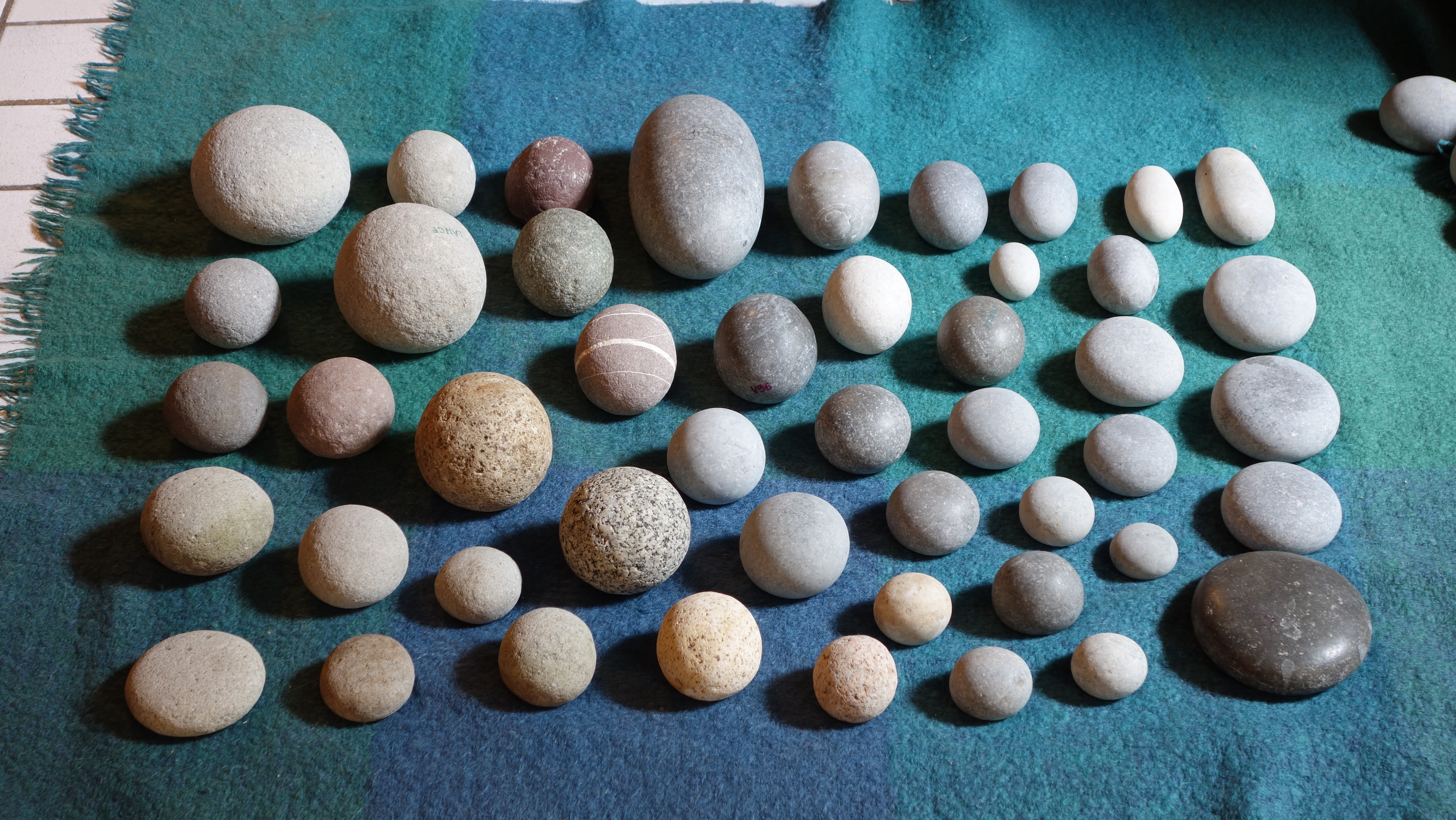
Collection of pebbles shaped in giant's kettles

Giant's kettles are formed while a bedrock surface is covered by a glacier. Water, produced by the thawing of the ice and snow, forms streams on the surface of the glacier, which, having gathered into their courses a certain amount of morainic debris, finally flow down a crevasse as a swirling cascade or moulin. The sides of the crevasse are abraded, and a vertical shaft is formed in the ice. The erosion may be continued into the bed of the glacier. After the ice departed the area, the giant's kettle formed as an empty shaft, or as a pipe filled with gravel, sand, or boulders. Such cavities and pipes afford valuable evidence as to the former extent of glaciers.

Similar potholes are encountered in riverbeds and the Channeled Scablands scoured by glacial outburst floods.

== Locations and notable examples ==
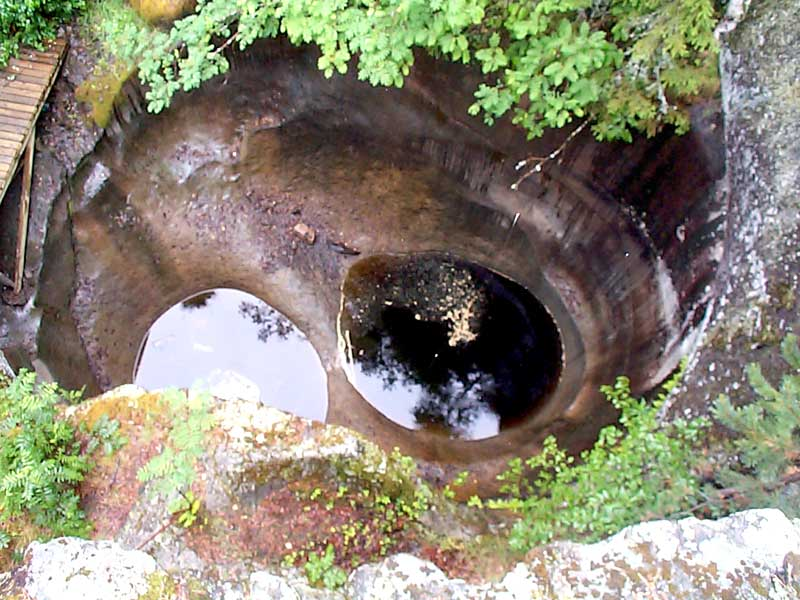
Giant's kettle in Rovaniemi, Finland

Giant's kettles are common in Germany (gletschertopf; glacier pot), Sweden (jättegryta), Finland (hiidenkirnu; hiisi's churn), and Moss Island in the United States.

In Sweden, they are found in relatively large numbers along the Bohuskusten as well as in the Stockholm area, and in Blekinge. For example, a giant's kettle can be seen under glass in the foundation of Solna's old courthouse in Hagaparken. There are also a number of giant's kettles on the island of Blå Jungfrun in northern Kalmarsund outside Oskarshamn. The Brobacka Nature Reserve, Sweden, located outside Alingsås between the lakes Mjörn and Anten, contains one of the country's most impressive areas with giant's kettles, boasting around forty excavations, where the largest one, with its 18 metres (59 ft) diameter, stands out. The giant's kettles can be accessed via the Brobacka Nature Center, and the location offers views over Lake Mjörn.

Helvete in Gausdal Municipality, Norway, is a gill about 100 metres (330 ft) deep with giant's kettles (Norwegian: jettegryter) up to 20 m (66 ft) wide and 60 m (200 ft) deep. The GletscherGarten of Lucerne (Switzerland) is famous for its giant's kettles, having 32 in number, the largest being 8 m (26 ft) wide and 9 m (30 ft) deep.

Another example is the large pothole found in Archbald, Pennsylvania, United States, in Archbald Pothole State Park.

== See also ==
- Pothole (disambiguation)
