= Mjörn (lake) =

Lake in Västergötland, Sweden

- Lake
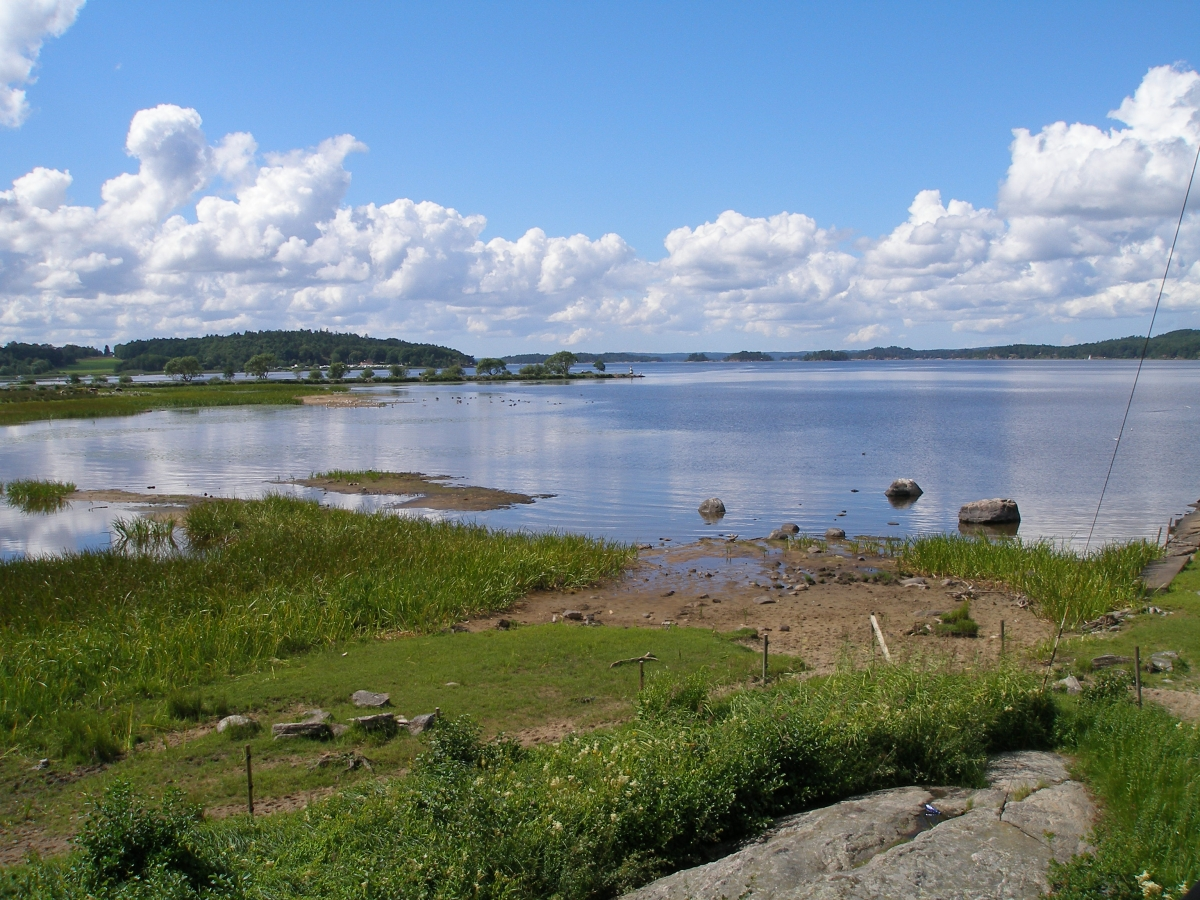
- Lake Mjörn
- Interactive map of Mjörn
- Location: Sweden
- Coordinates: 57°54′1.22″N 12°24′33.88″E
- Surface area: 54.5 km^{2} (21.0 sq mi)
- Average depth: 15.7 m (52 ft)
- Max. depth: 48 m (157 ft)
- Water volume: 855,010,000 m^{3} (3.0194×10^{10} cu ft)
- Shore length^{1}: 106 km (66 mi)
- Surface elevation: 57.1 m (187 ft)
- ^{1} Shore length is not a well-defined measure.

Mjörn is a lake in Västergötland, shared between the municipalities of Alingsås and Lerum and is part of the main catchment area of the Göta River. The lake is 48 meters deep, covers an area of 54.5 square kilometers and has an elevation of 57.1 meters above sea level.

== About the lake ==
Mjörn is 55 km^{2} in size and has a maximum depth of 48 meters. It is 16 km long and 7 km wide. This makes it the second largest lake in Västergötland that lies entirely within the landscape (after Unden). The lake is 58 m above sea level. There are around 60 named islands in Mjörn. Alingsås and Västra Bodarna lie on the lake's eastern shore and Sjövik and Björboholm on the western shore. The lake is not fully regulated, so the water level can vary quite considerably. Its ice and winds are also quite unpredictable. Mjörn is drained by Säveån.

Its tributaries include Lake Anten and Lake Ålandasjön in the north and Säveån through Alingsås. Its outflow is mainly in Solveden as well as the power plant in Norsesund. It then continues in the lake Sävelången, Säveån through Lerum and Partille municipalities and into the Göta River in Gothenburg.

There are several valuable biological, geological and cultural-historical areas around Mjörn.

== Fishes ==
Eighteen different species have been identified so far. Among these are more unusual species such as alpine bullhead, lamprey and the special Mjörn trout. The others are northern pike, perch, zander, eel, bream, roach, ide, tench, burbot, ninespine stickleblack, ruffe, vendace and smelt. A local rumor in the Alingså area claims that the lake also hosts the wels catfish, but this has never been confirmed.

A fishing license is required. In test fishing, perch, bream, northern pike, perch, zander, burbot, roach, ruffe, vendace and tench have been caught in the lake.

== Bird life ==
Mjörn also offers a rich bird life. There are purely maritime species here that do not normally belong in an inland environment, such as great black-backed gull, eurasian oystercatcher and common eider. During migration times, countless birds pass over Mjörn. Examples of breeding seabirds are the black-throated loon, osprey, little ringed plover, red-breasted merganser and great black-backed gull. Bird reserves have been established in Mjörn.

== Islands in Mjörn ==
All the islands in Mjörn are areas with high nature values. Several small islands are bird protection areas. As late as the 1950s, agriculture was practiced on four of the lake's largest islands. There are now two permanent homes, one on Bokö and one on Kärleken.

== Shipping ==
In 1987, the non-profit association "Mjörns Sjökortsförening" was formed with the aim of creating reliable nautical charts of Mjörn and to manage the marking of a fairway across the lake. Since then, the association has built five new lighthouses on the lake, in addition to the existing "Alingsås angöring" lighthouse, and published seven editions of nautical charts.

== Sub-catchment area ==
Mjörn is part of the sub-basin (642512-129848) that SMHI calls the outlet of Mjörn. The average height is 81 meters above sea level and the area is 155.69 square kilometers. If the 46 upstream catchment areas are included, the accumulated area is 1.115.33 square kilometers. The Säveån river that drains the catchment area has tributary order 2, which means that the water flows through a total of 2 watercourses before reaching the sea after 46 kilometers. The catchment area consists mostly of forest (41%). It also has 55.73 square kilometers of water surface, giving it a lake percentage of 35.8%. Settlements in the area cover an area of 8.65 square kilometers or 6% of the catchment area.

== Areas of application ==
Mjörn is popular as a swimming, boating and fishing lake. Alingsås Segelsällskap, Sjöscoutkår and Mjörns Motorbåtsällskap are based on the lake. Mjörns Ångbåtsförening operates the steam tug S/S Herbert, built in 1905. Recreational fishing is controlled by Alingsås Sportfiskeförening. The Mjörn Runt cycle race is organized annually, starting and finishing in Alingsås. Other associations with links to Mjörn include Föreningen Mjörn, Hjällnäs Båt- och Bryggförening, Mjörns Fiskevårdsområdesförening, Föreningen Mjörnbygden and Björboholms Segelsällskap.

The attractiveness of the environment around the lake is shown by the increased demand for plots and large house constructions in Alingsås. The attraction is the "magnificent view of Lake Mjörn". Also worth mentioning are the old historic large farms of Bryngenäs, Öijared, Östad and Vikaryd.

In connection with the advent of the railroad, typical summer homes were built. The villages of Björboholm, Västra Bodarne and Skår, Lövekulle with its large holiday villas, owned by wealthy merchants mostly from Gothenburg, developed alongside both the Western Main Line, whose first sod was turned in Lövekulle outside Alingsås, and the West Gothenburg Line. Several of them still exist along the shores of Lake Mjörn.

== The name ==
The lake's oldest name is Mior, and it is already mentioned in Västgötalagen (1350) as a public lake. According to the county administrative board, Mjörn has also been classified as a lake with "particularly high nature value", meaning the highest possible classification.

== History of the lake ==
There are many ancient remains around the lake and on the islands, and ancient finds have been found on the shores and islands. Several excavations have been made on Risön and objects from the Stone Age (3000-1800 BC) have been found.

At the Brobacka Nature Reserve on the northern shore of Mjörn, Scandinavia's largest giant's kettle field can be found, with the largest one measuring approximately 18 metres (59 ft) in diameter. It serves as a reminder of the time when the inland ice covered the area. The powerful flow of meltwater through the narrow passage in Brobacka carried large stones, shaping the enormous kettles.

Mjörn was once part of the North Sea and remnants from this period can still be found today, including so-called glacial marine relics, caridean shrimp that have adapted to fresh water and seashells from sea snails.
