= Pothole (disambiguation) =

A pothole is a surface disruption in a roadway, caused by fatigue and erosion.

Pothole may also refer to:

- Pothole (geology), a phenomenon encountered in the platinum mining industry in South Africa
- Pothole (landform), evorsion, swirlhole, or giant's kettle, a smooth, bowl-shaped or cylindrical hollow created by water erosion of bedrock
- Pothole, or panhole, a shallow solution basin, or closed depression, found on flat or gently sloping rock
- Pothole, a shallow depression formed during deglaciation commonly known as a kettle (landform), often containing a lake or marsh, as in the Prairie Pothole Region of North America
- Pothole, or pit cave, a predominantly vertical cave system

== See also ==
- Potholes, California
- Potholes (film), a 1928 Soviet silent film
- "Pothole", a song by Tyler, the Creator from the 2017 album Flower Boy
- Pothole, the upper section of Bull Shoals Lake, Missouri
- Potholes Reservoir, Washington state
- Potholing, or caving, spelunking
- Pothole Dome
- The Pothole (Seinfeld)
