= Emil Victor Langlet =

Swedish architect (1824–1898)

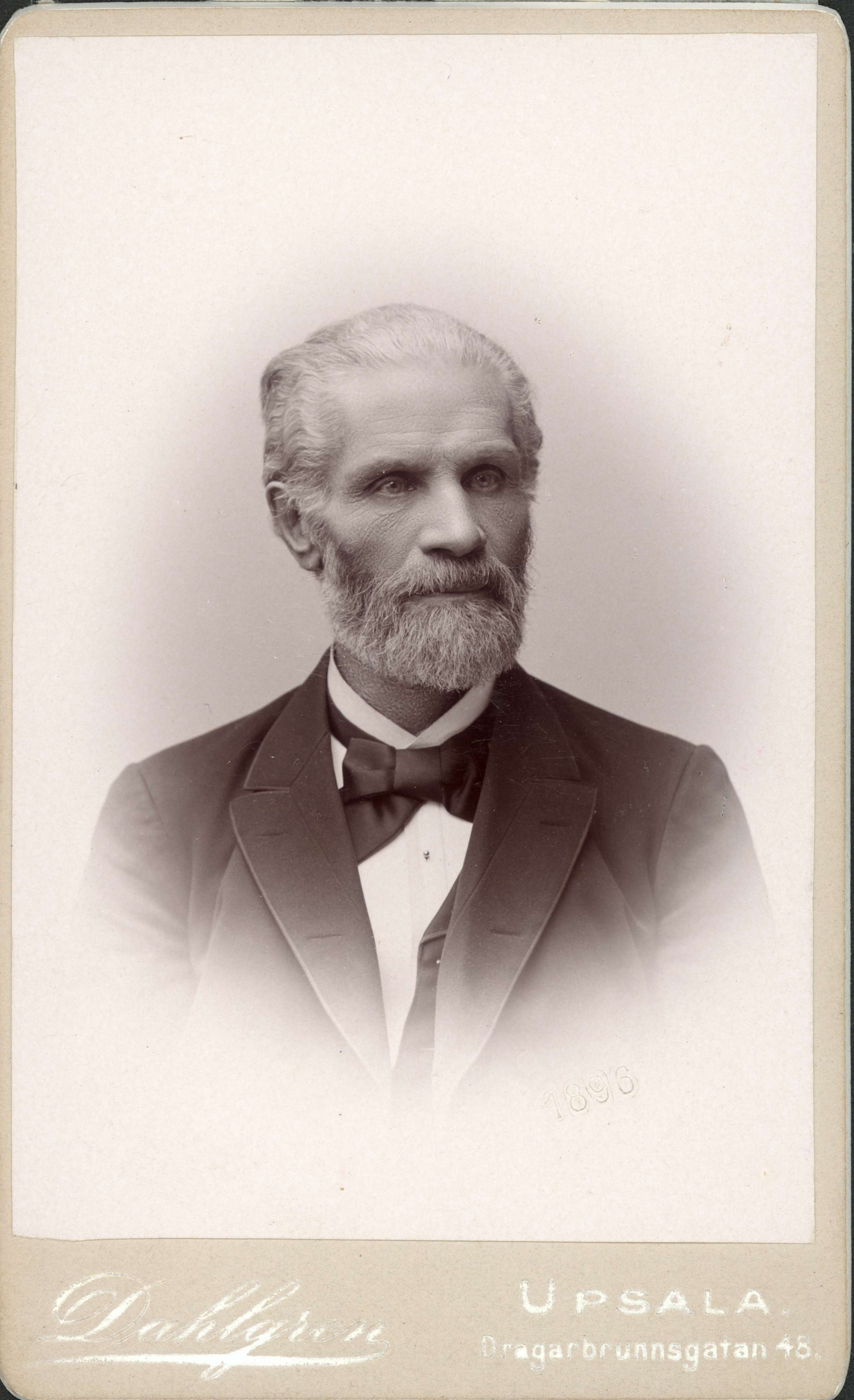
Emil Victor Langlet

Emil Victor Langlet (26 February 1824 – 10 March 1898) was a Swedish architect. He is most commonly associated with his design for the Norwegian Parliament Building in Oslo, Norway.

== Background ==
Langlet was born in Borås, Sweden. He was educated at Chalmers University of Technology in Gothenburg and at the Royal Institute of Art, Stockholm where he trained under Per Axel Nyström (1793-1868). From 1850, he attended the École des Beaux-arts in Paris where he trained under Guillaume-Abel Blouet (1795–1853).

== Career ==
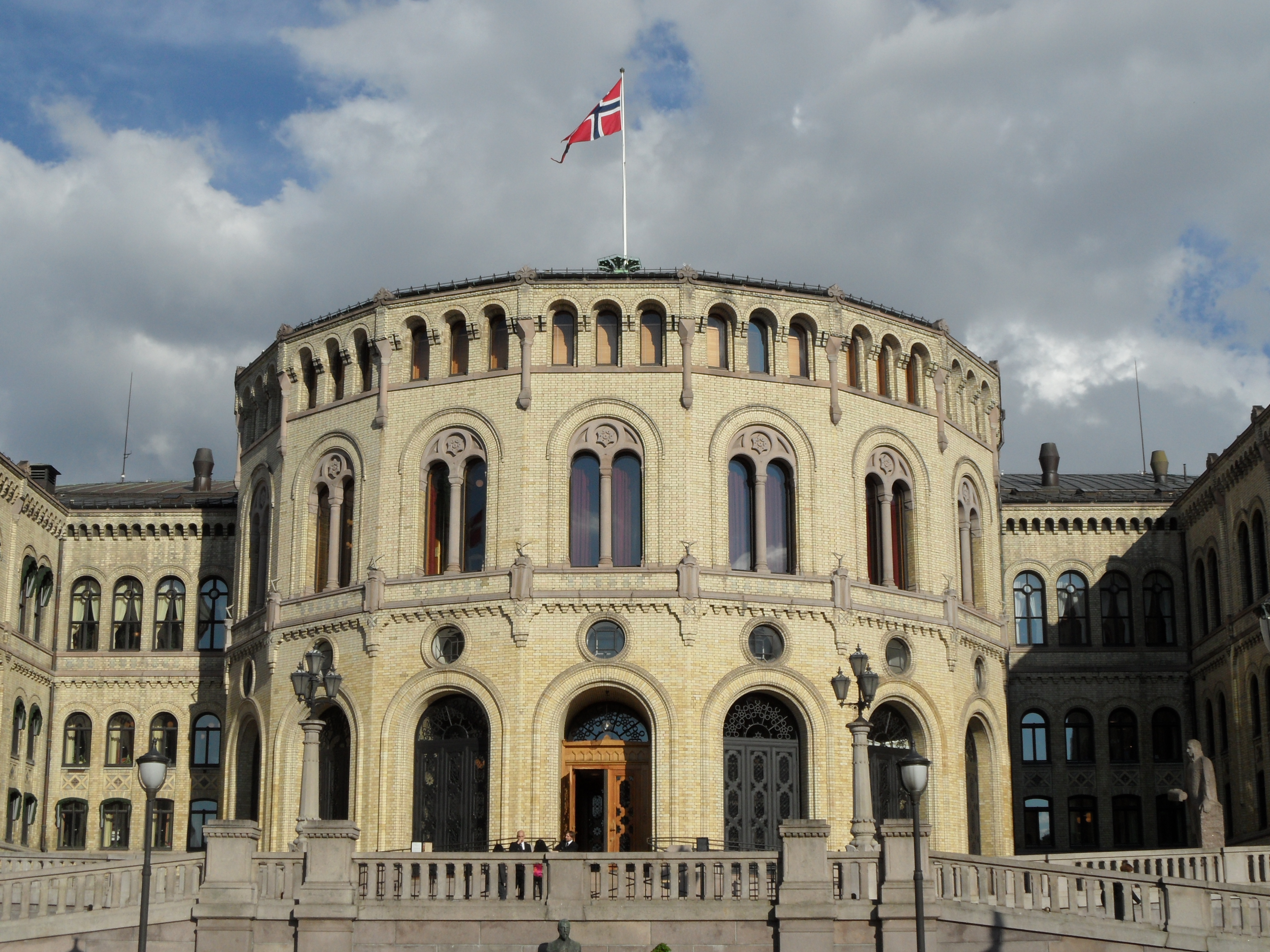
Norwegian Parliament Building, Oslo (1866)

He first made his mark when designing the Norwegian Parliament Building, which was built between 1861 and 1866. He also drew plans the Fredrikstad Town Hall (1861-64) and the Fredrikstad Hospital (1863), several villas and Sagatun, the first folk high school in Norway. After 1866 he returned to Sweden, where he oversaw the construction of twelve churches, including Erska Church in Sollebrunn (1885-1886). He still drew the occasional building in Norway, including Hartvig Nissens Girls' School in Oslo (1859-60) and Drammen Theater (1869–1870).

From 1867, he was included in the editorial staff of the engineering publication Tidskrift för byggkunkonst og ingeniørskennis. He took the position of editor in 1871. He was also an instructor at KTH Royal Institute of Technology. He was later given responsibility for the Stockholm Royal Palace.

From 1884 to 1886 he led the works for the preservation of the medieval Visby City Wall (Visby ringmur).

From 1886 to 1893 was the building manager for the restoration of the 13th century Uppsala Cathedral (Uppsala domkyrka).

== Personal life ==
Emil Victor Langlet was married to author and translator Clara Mathilda Ulrika Clementine Söderén (1832-1904). They were the parents of civil engineer Filip Langlet (1866-1950), chemist Abraham Langlet (1868-1936), painter Alexander Langlet (1870-1953) and author Valdemar Langlet (1872-1960).

== Gallery ==
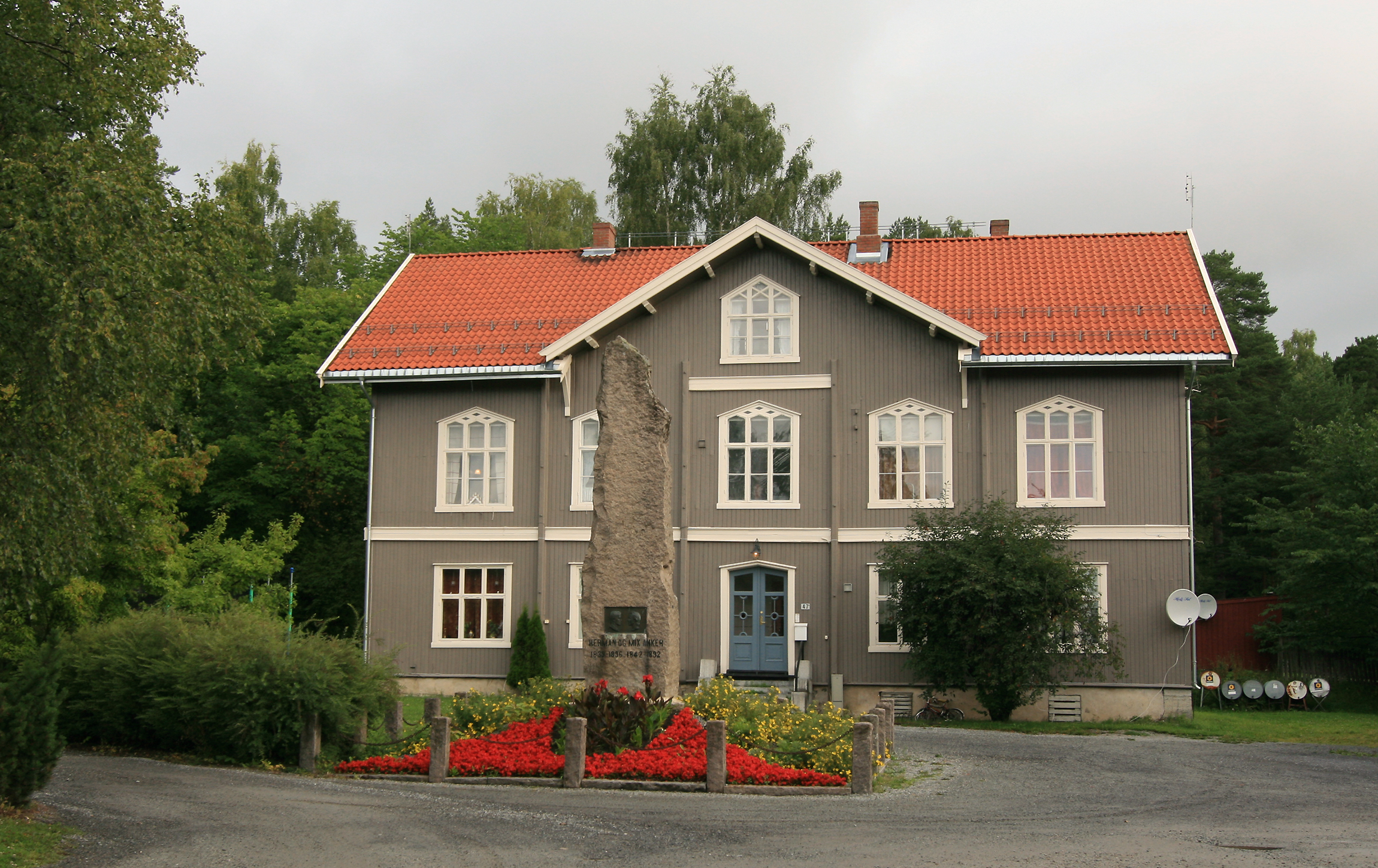
Sagatun Folk High School (1864)

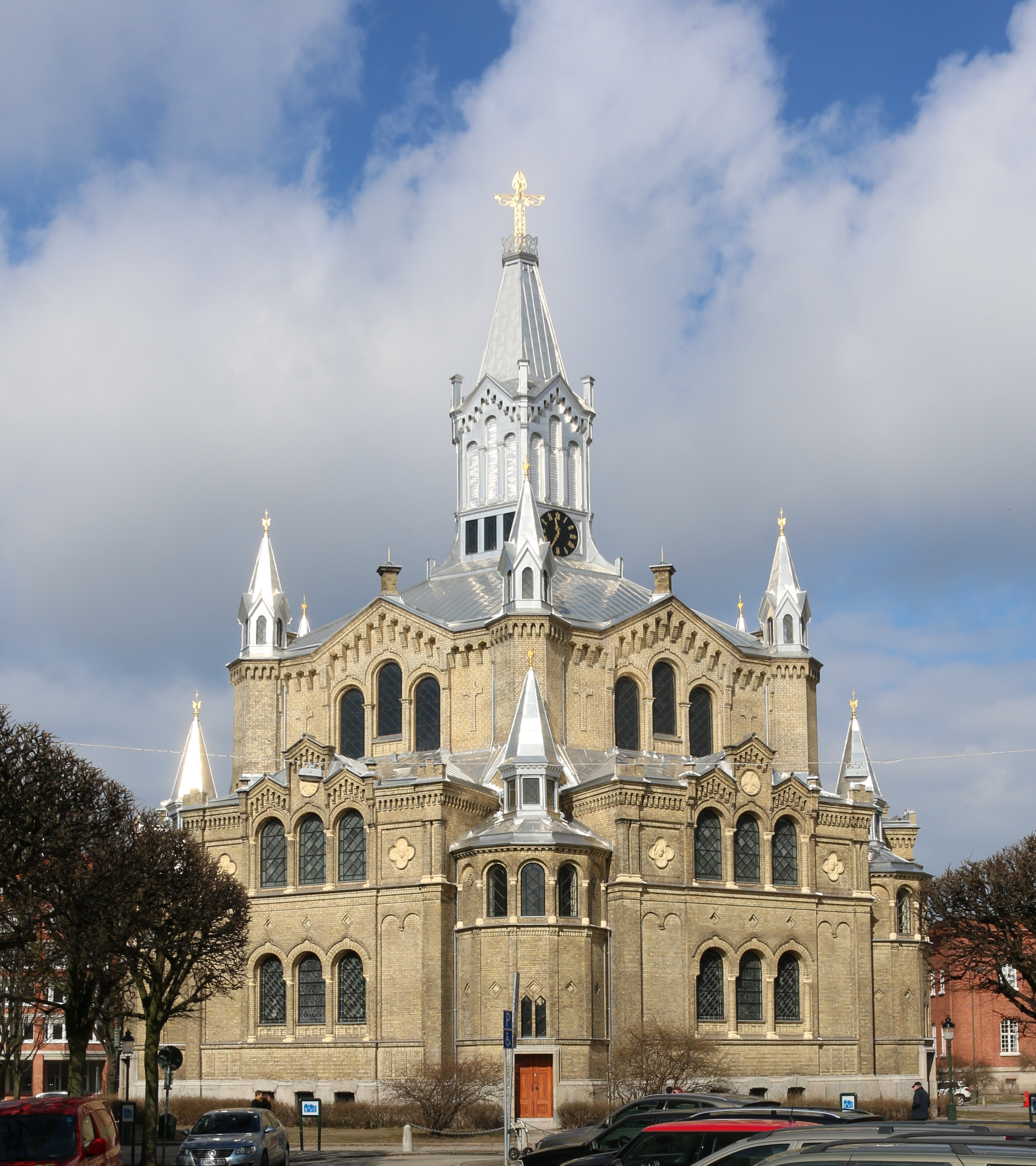
St. Pauli Church, Malmö (1882)

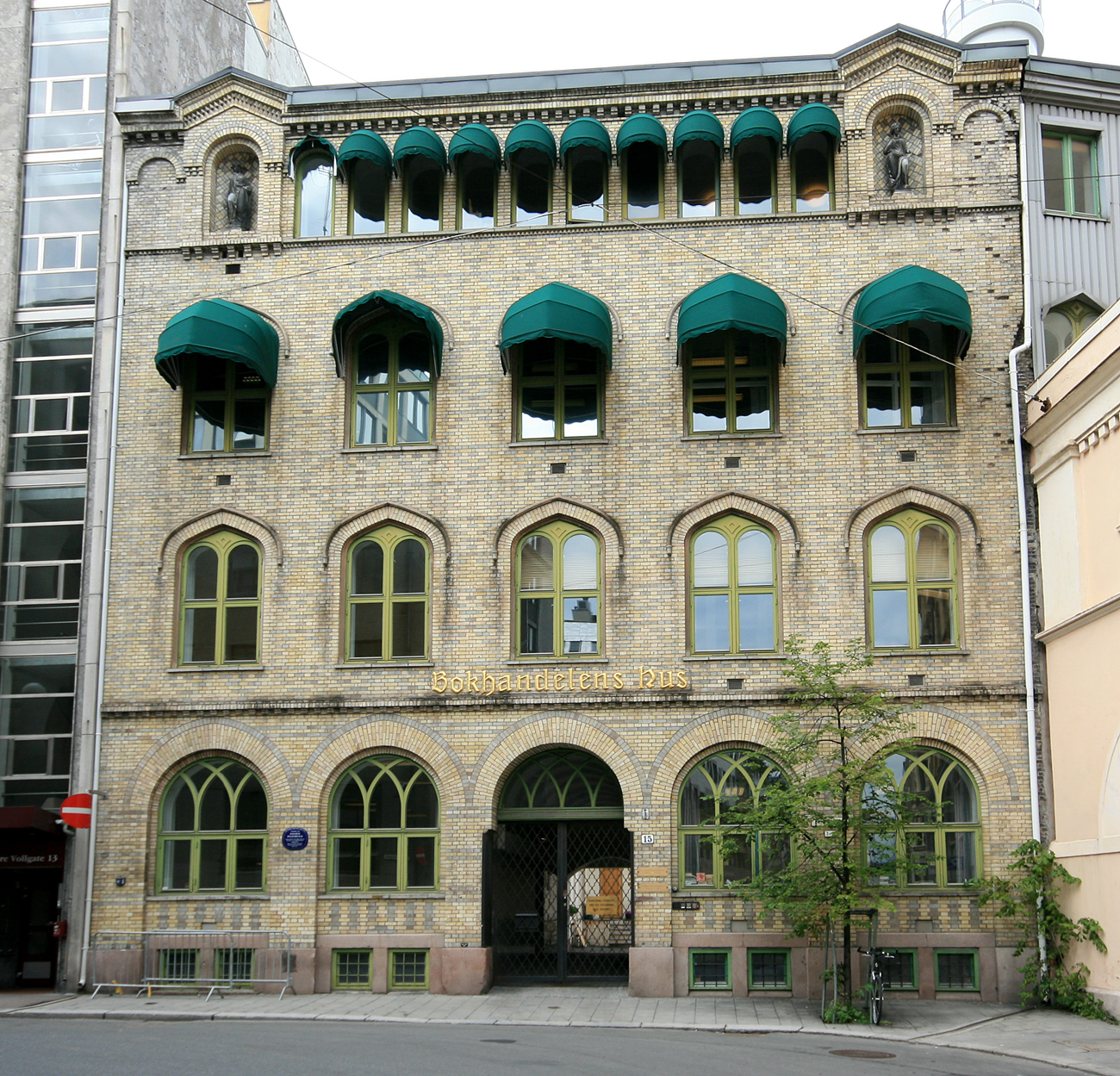
Bokhandelens hus, Oslo (1860)

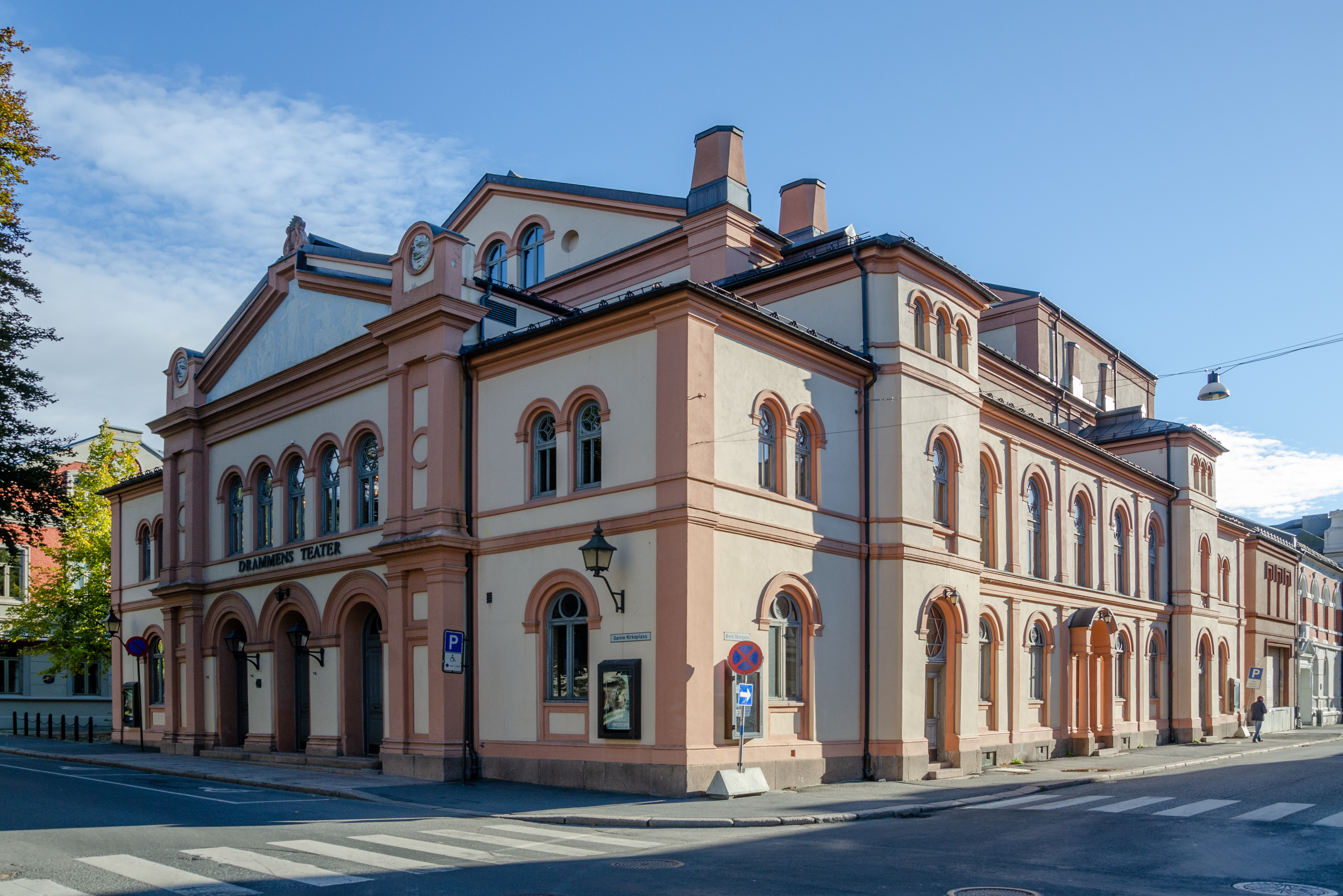
Drammen Theater (1869)

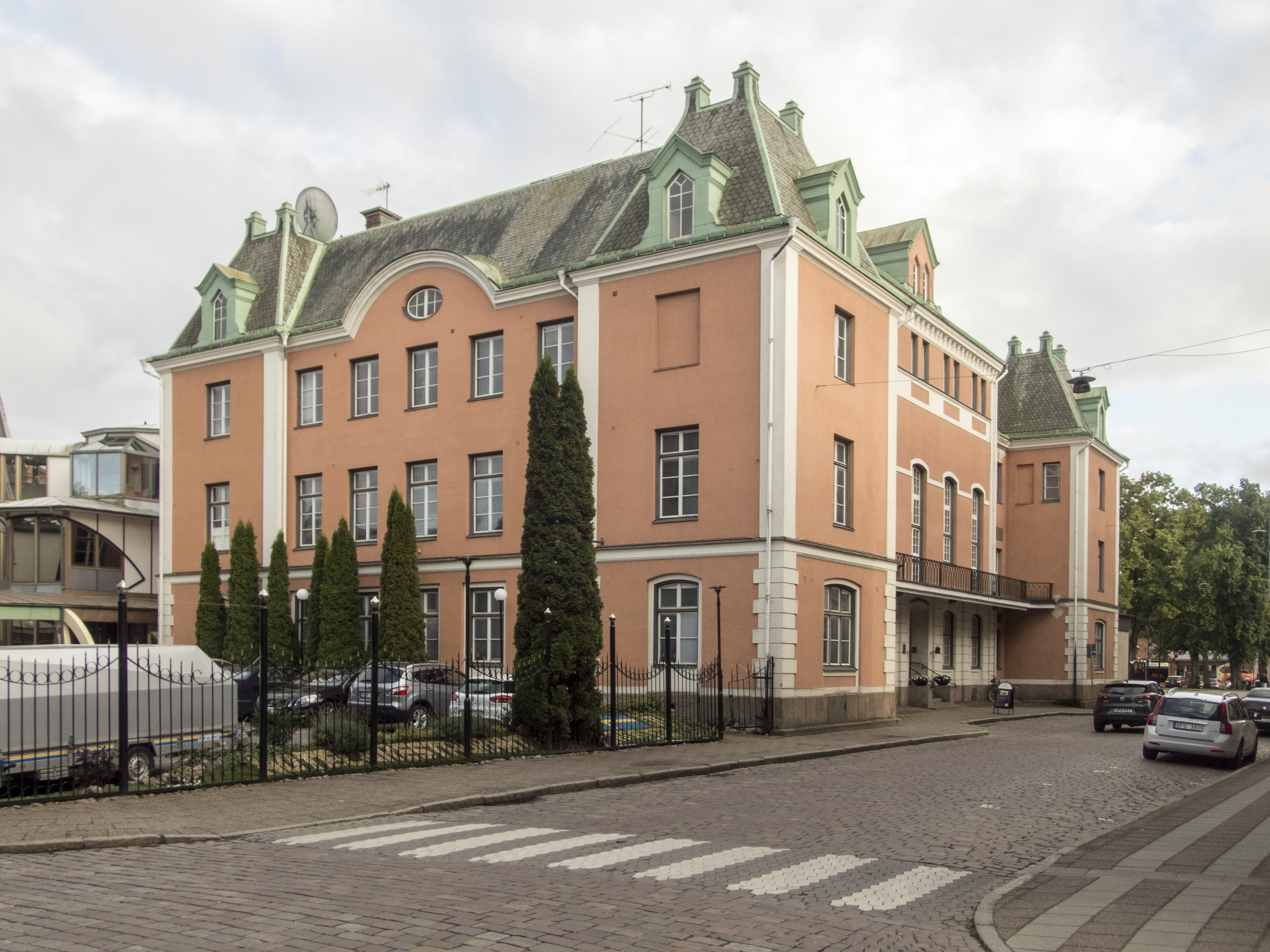
Skara Stadshotellet (1874-1875)

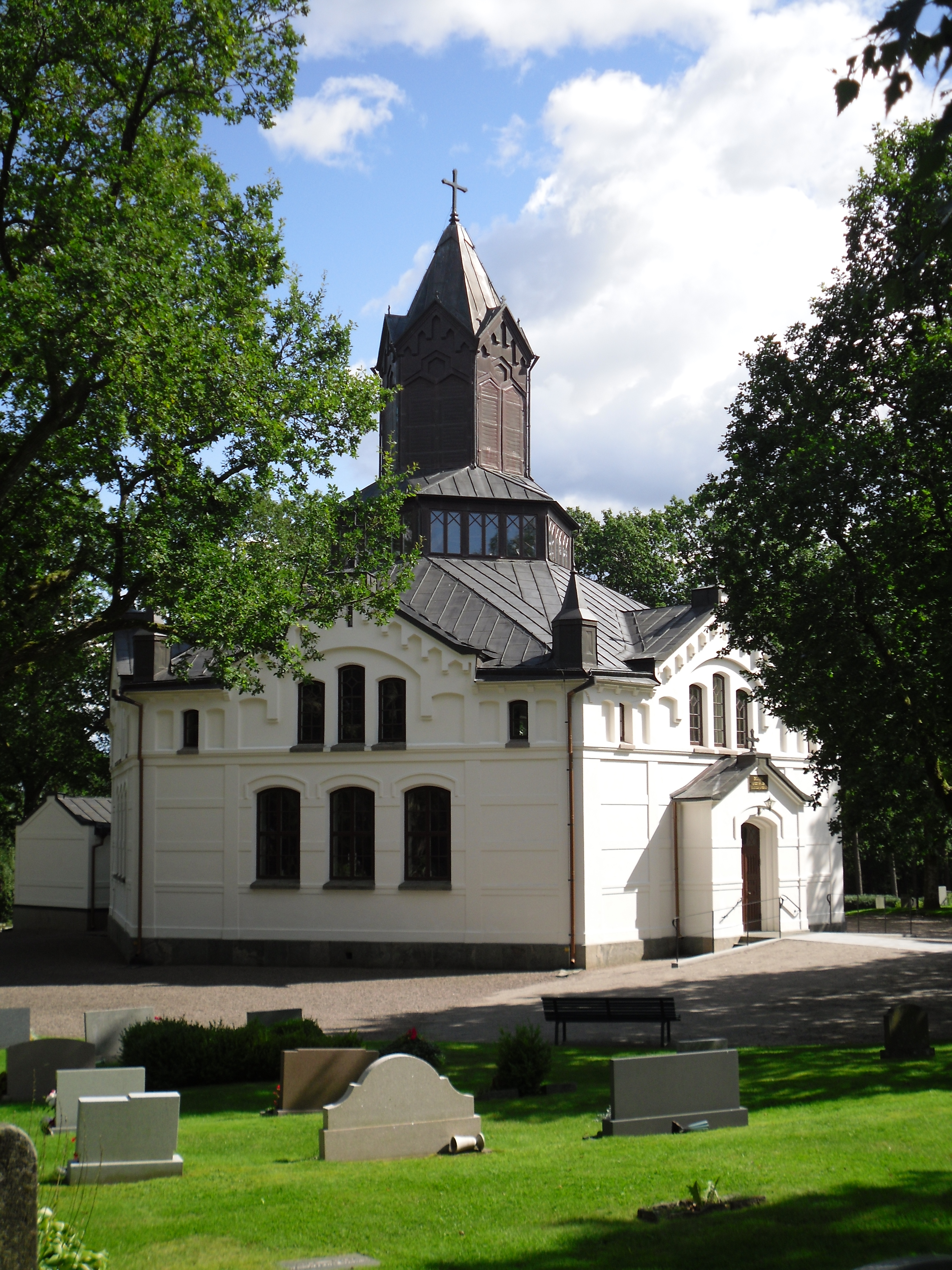
Erska Church, Sollebrunn (1885-1886)
