= Hjälmared, Alingsås =

Hjälmared
- Location within Västra Götaland Location within Sweden
- Coordinates: 57°53′N 12°32′E
- Country: Sweden
- Province: Västergötland
- County: Västra Götaland County
- Municipality: Alingsås Municipality

Area
  - Total: 0.36 km^{2} (0.14 sq mi)

Population (31 December 2010)
  - Total: 260
  - Density: 718/km^{2} (1,860/sq mi)
- Time zone: UTC+1 (CET)
  - Summer (DST): UTC+2 (CEST)

Hjälmared is a locality situated in Alingsås Municipality, Västra Götaland County, Sweden. It had 260 inhabitants in 2010.
