= Stamsjö =

- Location within Västra Götaland Location within Sweden
- Coordinates: 57°45′10″N 12°17′10″E
- Country: Sweden
- Province: Västergötland
- County: Västra Götaland County
- Municipality: Lerum Municipality

Area
  - Total: 0.27 km^{2} (0.10 sq mi)

Population (31 December 2010)
  - Total: 408
  - Density: 1,534/km^{2} (3,970/sq mi)
- Time zone: UTC+1 (CET)
  - Summer (DST): UTC+2 (CEST)

Stamsjö (or Hallsåsåsen) is a locality situated in Lerum Municipality, Västra Götaland County, Sweden with 408 inhabitants in 2010.
