= Stora Mellby Church =

Church in Stora Mellby, Sweden

Coordinates: 58°8′46″N 12°34′36″E

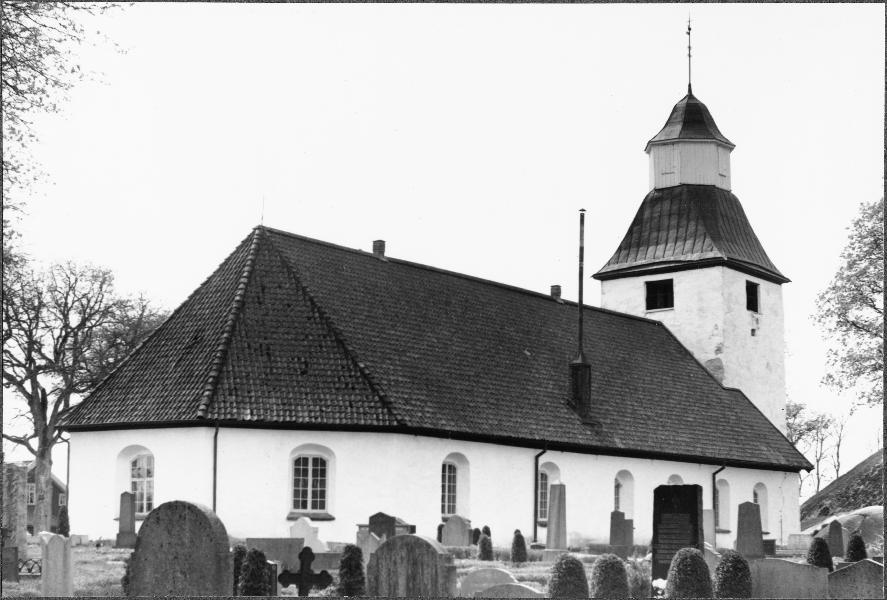
Stora Mellby Church in 1952

Stora Mellby Church (Swedish: Stora Mellby kyrka) is a church in Stora Mellby, Alingsås Municipality, Västergötland, Sweden. It belongs to the parish of Bjärke, in the Diocese of Skara.

The stone church was built in the early Middle Ages. In 1724, the church was broadened to the north and extended. A five-story tower was added in the west in 1762–1765, and in 1828 the church was extended to the east, when the old chancel and sacristy was demolished. A new triangular cross was built. The roof is hipped over the chancel. The baptismal font with carved ornaments are from the 12th century or 13th century. The pulpit is from the 18th century and is decorated with columns and evangelistic images. The altarpiece is a sculpted crucifix surrounded by sculptures depicting Peter and Paul. These were donated to the church in 1737 by the Baroness Fehman. The current organ was made in 1966 by Nils Hammarberg.
