= Öxeryd =

- Location within Västra Götaland Location within Sweden
- Coordinates: 57°44′15″N 12°16′30″E
- Country: Sweden
- Province: Västergötland
- County: Västra Götaland County
- Municipality: Lerum Municipality

Area
  - Total: 0.87 km^{2} (0.34 sq mi)

Population (31 December 2010)
  - Total: 491
  - Density: 564/km^{2} (1,460/sq mi)
- Time zone: UTC+1 (CET)
  - Summer (DST): UTC+2 (CEST)

Öxeryd is a locality situated in Lerum Municipality, Västra Götaland County, Sweden. It had 491 inhabitants in 2010.
