= Erska Church =

Church in Alingsås, Sweden

Coordinates: 58°6′42″N 12°31′12″E

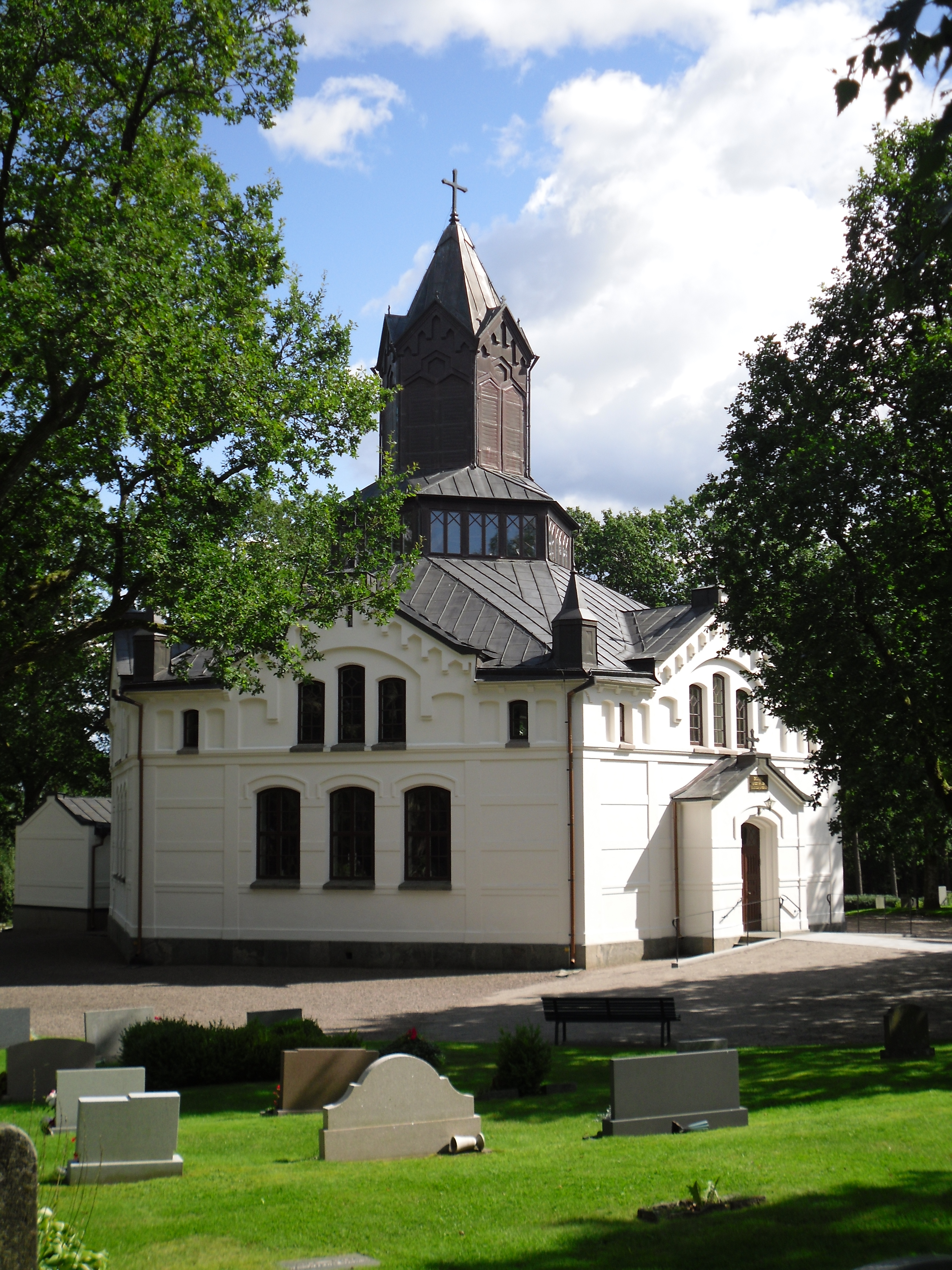
Erska Church

Erska Church (Swedish: Erska kyrka) is a church in Sollebrunn, Västergötland, Sweden. Erska Church stands on a hill near the town center. The first medieval church on the site was made of wood, and was probably destroyed by the Danes during the wars in the early 1600s. It was replaced by a stone church around 1630, funded by Count Johan Casimir Lejonhufvud of Raseborg. This church had a wooden bell tower, and a bell dated to 1689. The bell was recast in 1784.

The current church, designed by Emil Viktor Langlet, was built from 1885 to 1886 in the Byzantine style in a hexagonal shape, with a central tower above the nave. The facades are whitewashed. The older church was demolished around 1888. In 1939, work began preserving and strengthening the chapel.
