= Stenkullen =

Coordinates: 57°47.525′N 12°18.839′E

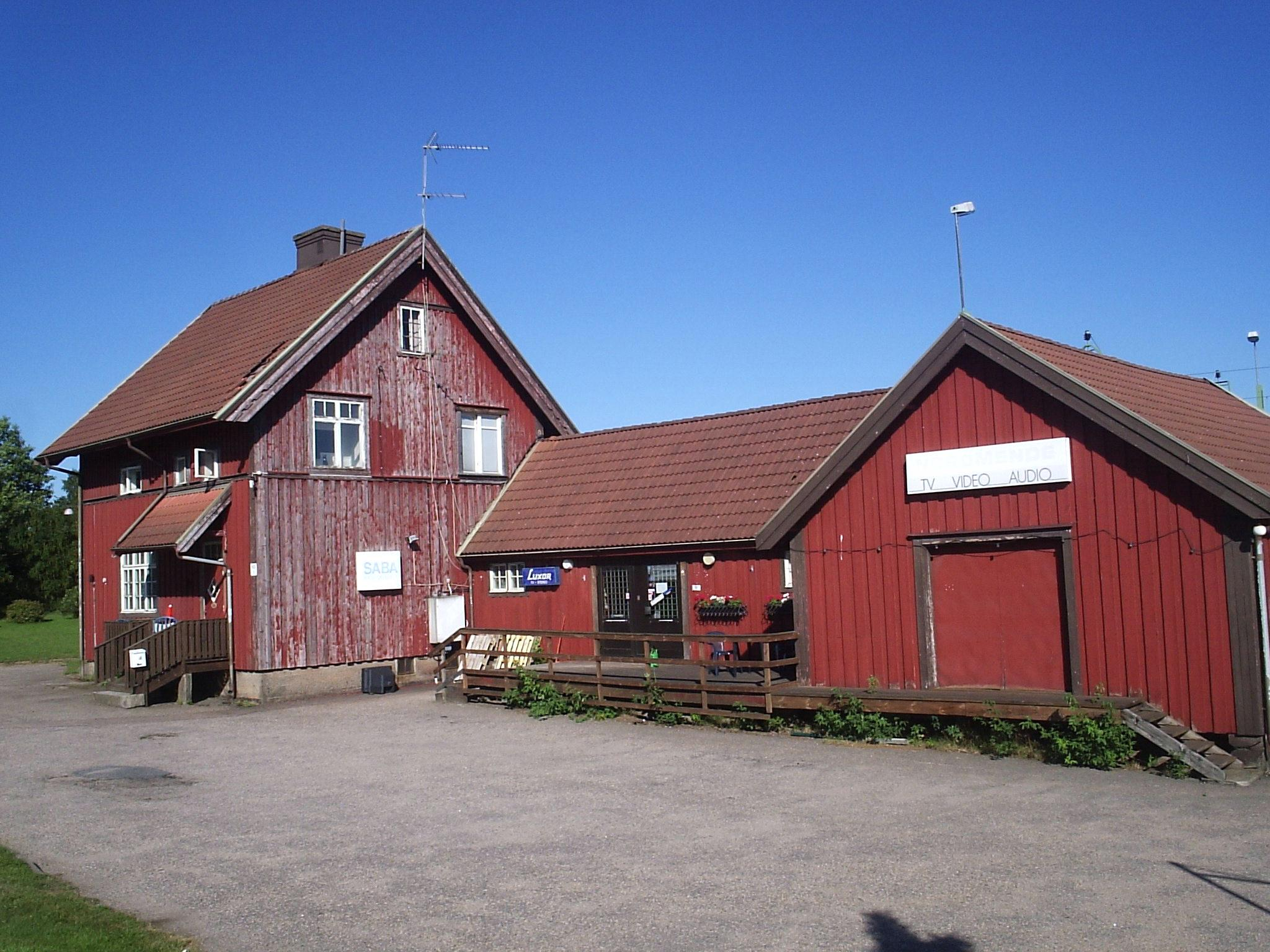
Stenkullen Station Building

Stenkullen is a part of Lerum Municipality, Sweden. Stekullen is situated by the river Säveån. It is home for the soccer team, Stenkullens GoIK, and the ice hockey team, Lerums boll klubb (LBK), where NHL player Loui Eriksson started playing hockey. Stenkullen has the largest skatepark in the Municipality.
