= Alströmergymnasiet =

High school in Alingsås, Sweden

Coordinates: 57.9380°N 12.5288°E

Alströmergymnasiet is a high school in Alingsås, Sweden, opened in 1969.
