= Stenkullens GoIK =

Swedish football club

Stenkullen GoIK
- Full name: Stenkullens Gymnastik och Idrottsklubb
- Founded: 1926
- Ground: Stenkullens IP; Stenkullen; Sweden
- Chairman: Ove Nilsson
- Head coach: Markus Engelbertsen
- Coach: Bernt Ahlenius
- League: Division 4 Göteborg A
| Home colours | Away colours |

Stenkullens GoIK is a Swedish football club located in Stenkullen.

== Background ==
Stenkullens GoIK currently plays in Division 4 Göteborg A which is the sixth tier of Swedish football. They play their home matches at the Stenkullen IP in Stenkullen.

The club is affiliated to Göteborgs Fotbollförbund.

The women's soccer team was started in 1970, and played six seasons in the Swedish top division between 1979 and 1986. and won the district championship in 1979 and 1981.

Monika Jacobsson scored 236 goals for the women's team between 1973 and 1975, and played for the Swedish national team. Goalkeeper Sabine Piltorp also played for Sweden, however that occurred when her club team was Jitex BK.

== Season to season ==
| Season | Level | Division | Section | Position | Movements |
|---|---|---|---|---|---|
| 2006* | Tier 8 | Division 6 | Göteborg A | 3rd | |
| 2007 | Tier 8 | Division 6 | Göteborg A | 6th | |
| 2008 | Tier 8 | Division 6 | Göteborg A | 2nd | Promoted |
| 2009 | Tier 7 | Division 5 | Göteborg A | 8th | |
| 2010 | Tier 7 | Division 5 | Göteborg A | 2nd | Promoted |
| 2011 | Tier 6 | Division 4 | Göteborg A | 3rd | |
| 2012 | Tier 6 | Division 4 | Göteborg A | 10th | |

* League restructuring in 2006 resulted in a new division being created at Tier 3 and subsequent divisions dropping a level.
