= Tollered =

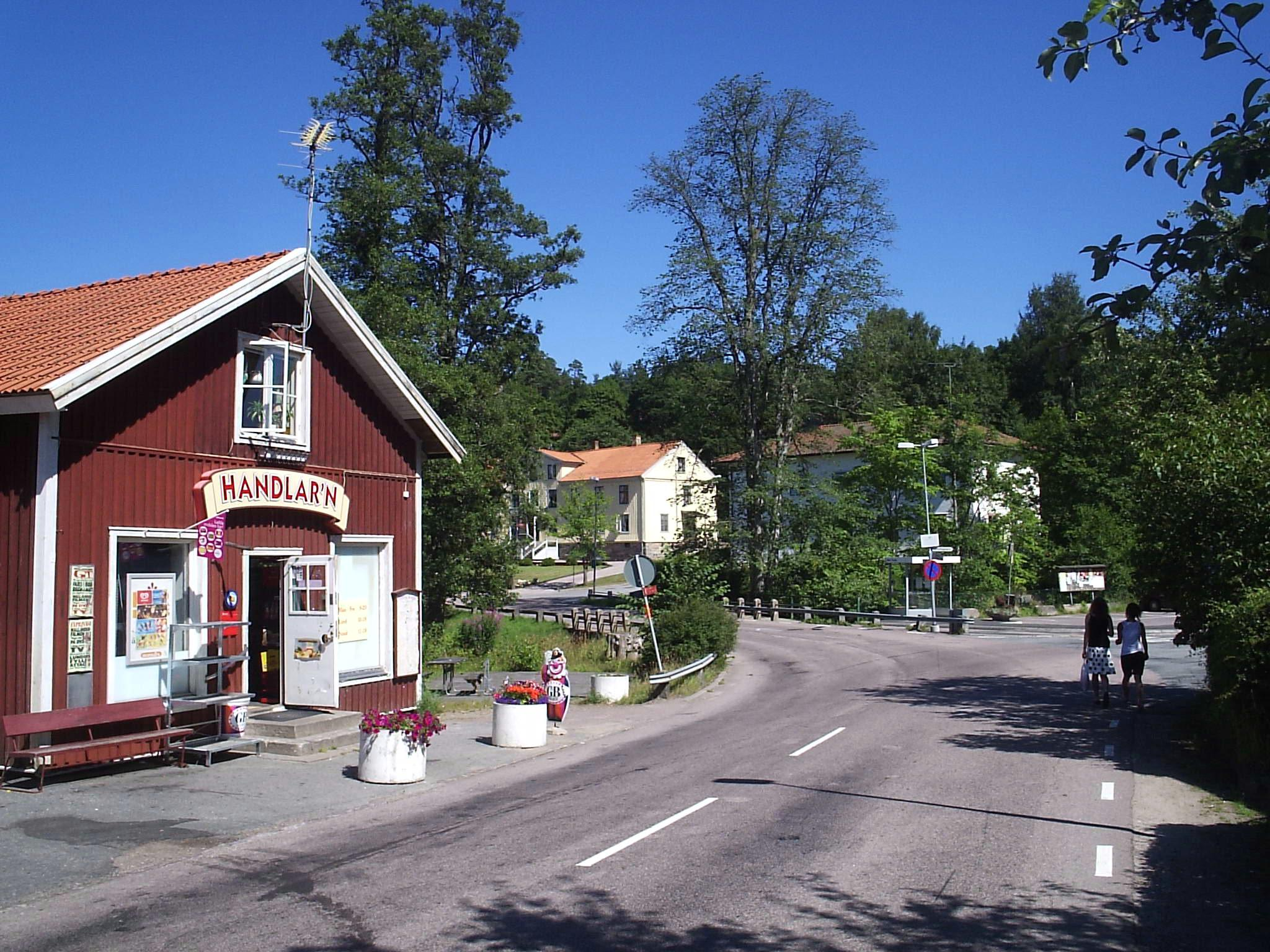

- Location within Västra Götaland Location within Sweden
- Coordinates: 57°49′N 12°26′E
- Country: Sweden
- Province: Västergötland
- County: Västra Götaland County
- Municipality: Lerum Municipality

Area
  - Total: 0.65 km^{2} (0.25 sq mi)

Population (31 December 2010)
  - Total: 900
  - Density: 1,382/km^{2} (3,580/sq mi)
- Time zone: UTC+1 (CET)
  - Summer (DST): UTC+2 (CEST)

Tollered is a locality situated in Lerum Municipality, Västra Götaland County, Sweden. It had 900 inhabitants in 2010.
