= Noltorp Church =

Church in Alingsås, Västergötland, Sweden

Coordinates: 57°56′15″N 12°31′7″E

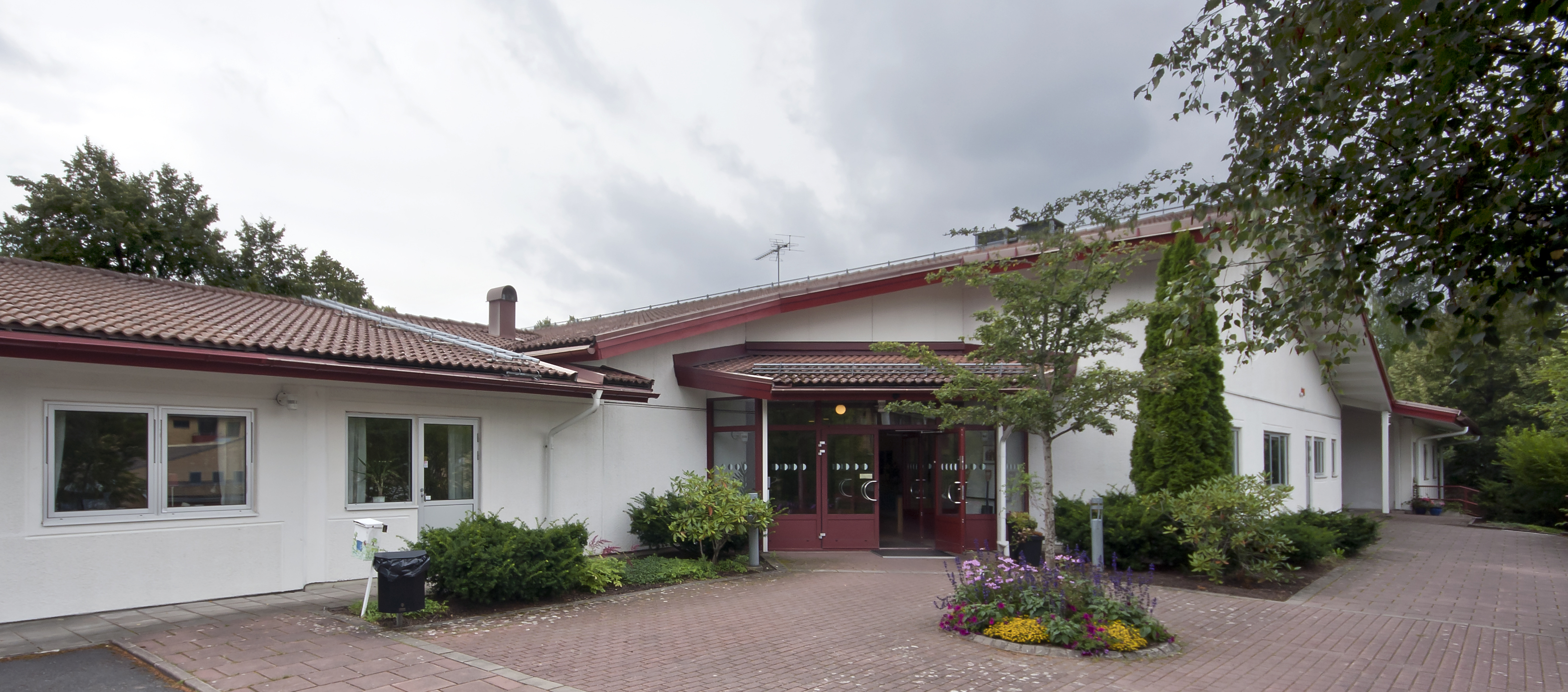
The church in 2012

Noltorp Church (Swedish: Noltorpskyrkan) is a church in Alingsås, Västergötland, Sweden. It is partner church, run in collaboration between the Alingsås Assembly and the ETUC Mission Association in Noltorp. The church was built in 1991 and replaced an earlier place of worship which was housed in a wooden villa. The building complex, which was inaugurated in December 1991, has two floors. The altar relief was carved by Eva Spångberg.
