= Västra Bodarna =

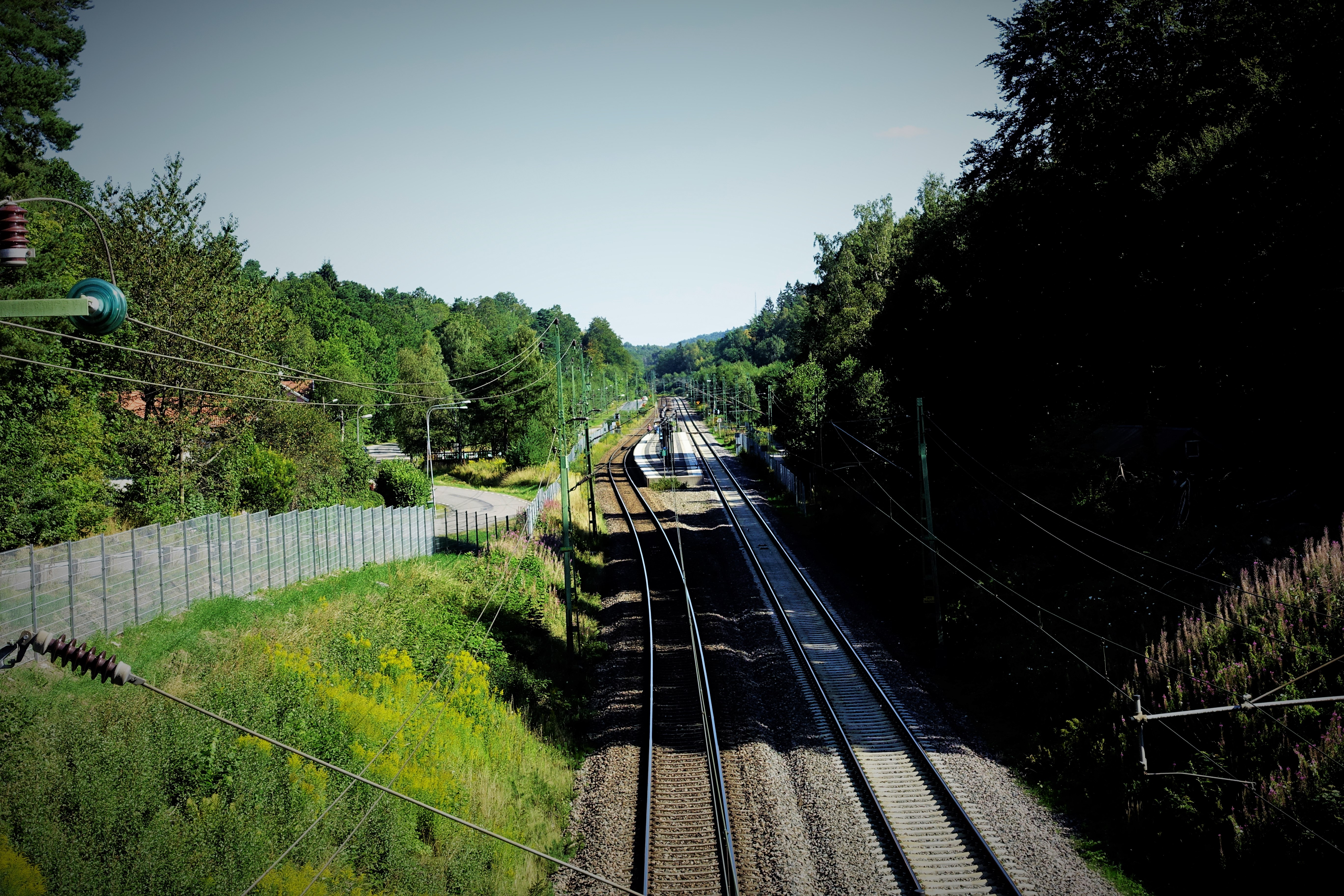
- Commuter train station in Västra Bodarna

- Location within Västra Götaland Location within Sweden
- Coordinates: 57°53′N 12°29′E
- Country: Sweden
- Province: Västergötland
- County: Västra Götaland County
- Municipality: Alingsås Municipality

Area
  - Total: 2.05 km^{2} (0.79 sq mi)

Population (31 December 2010)
  - Total: 1,059
  - Density: 516/km^{2} (1,340/sq mi)
- Time zone: UTC+1 (CET)
  - Summer (DST): UTC+2 (CEST)

Västra Bodarna (Västra Bodarne) is a locality situated in Alingsås Municipality, Västra Götaland County, Sweden. It had 1,059 inhabitants in 2010.
