= Pothole (geology) =

Depression in rock filled with cool magma

A geological pothole is a natural depression in the rock filled with cooled magma, creating a fault. In horizontal section, potholes are roughly circular to elliptical and vary in diameter from 20 m to more than 1 km. In vertical section, their shape is generally dish-like and may be quite asymmetric.

== Formation ==
Potholes are frequently encountered during mining operations in the Bushveld Igneous Complex in South Africa. The massive intrusion of molten magma, predating the nearby Vredefort impact by at least 30 million years, led to partial to complete melting of the cumulus floor already in place. Flow and turbulence, high temperatures, and chemical reactions sculpted and potholed the surface of the floor in a process similar to the erosion caused by running water that results in a riverbed pothole. With the end of the outpouring, when emplacement ceased, cooling of the magma started, leaving the potholes filled, and creating a fault surface at the interface of the pothole and the filling magma. The final phase was when crystallisation of chromitite was followed by that of pyroxene and plagioclase, while the contents of the potholes, also consisting of UG2 or Merensky Reef, but having followed a different cooling profile, showed little or no crystallisation of chromitite.

== Mining ==
In the Bushveld Igneous Complex, two orebodies, the Upper Group 2 (UG2) and the Merensky Reef, host about 70% of the world's platinum group metals (PGM), and pose major extraction problems for the mining industry in their faults, dykes, joints, domes, iron-rich ultramafic pegmatoids, rolls and dunite pipes. The greatest mining problems, though, are presented by potholes.

The problems posed by potholes to mining operations are rooted in the fracturing and fragmentation of the material in potholes and their surroundings. These lead to ground instabilities, especially in the hanging wall, and serious safety hazards. Mining is generally abandoned when more than about 40% of the raise line is potholed. A crew for developing new raise lines is usually on standby for such cases, incurring considerable development and labour costs.
