= Stora Mellby =

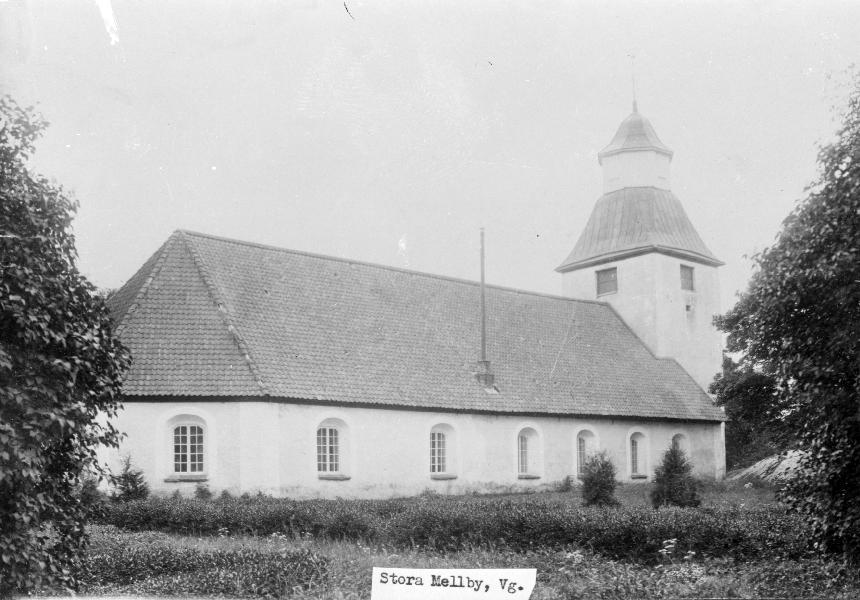

- Location within Västra Götaland Location within Sweden
- Coordinates: 58°08′N 12°34′E
- Country: Sweden
- Province: Västergötland
- County: Västra Götaland County
- Municipality: Alingsås Municipality

Area
  - Total: 0.55 km^{2} (0.21 sq mi)

Population (31 December 2010)
  - Total: 321
  - Density: 589/km^{2} (1,530/sq mi)
- Time zone: UTC+1 (CET)
  - Summer (DST): UTC+2 (CEST)

Stora Mellby is a locality situated in Alingsås Municipality, Västra Götaland County, Sweden. It had 321 inhabitants in 2010. It contains Stora Mellby Church.
