= Jonas Alströmer =

Swedish agriculture and industry pioneer (1685–1761)

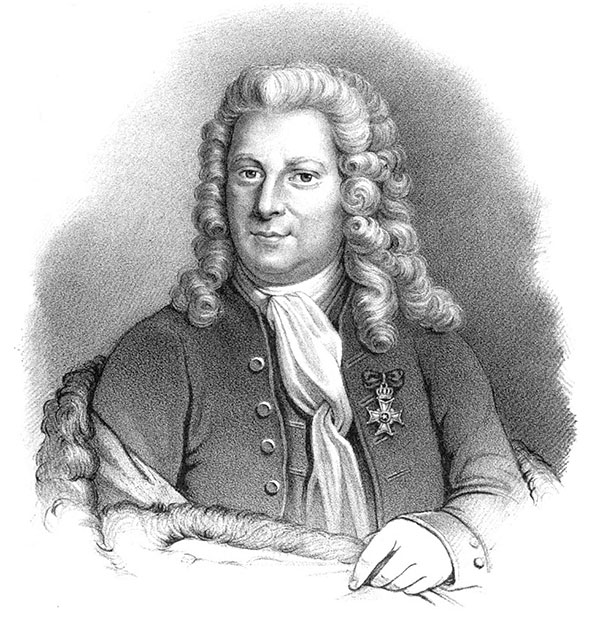
Jonas Alströmer

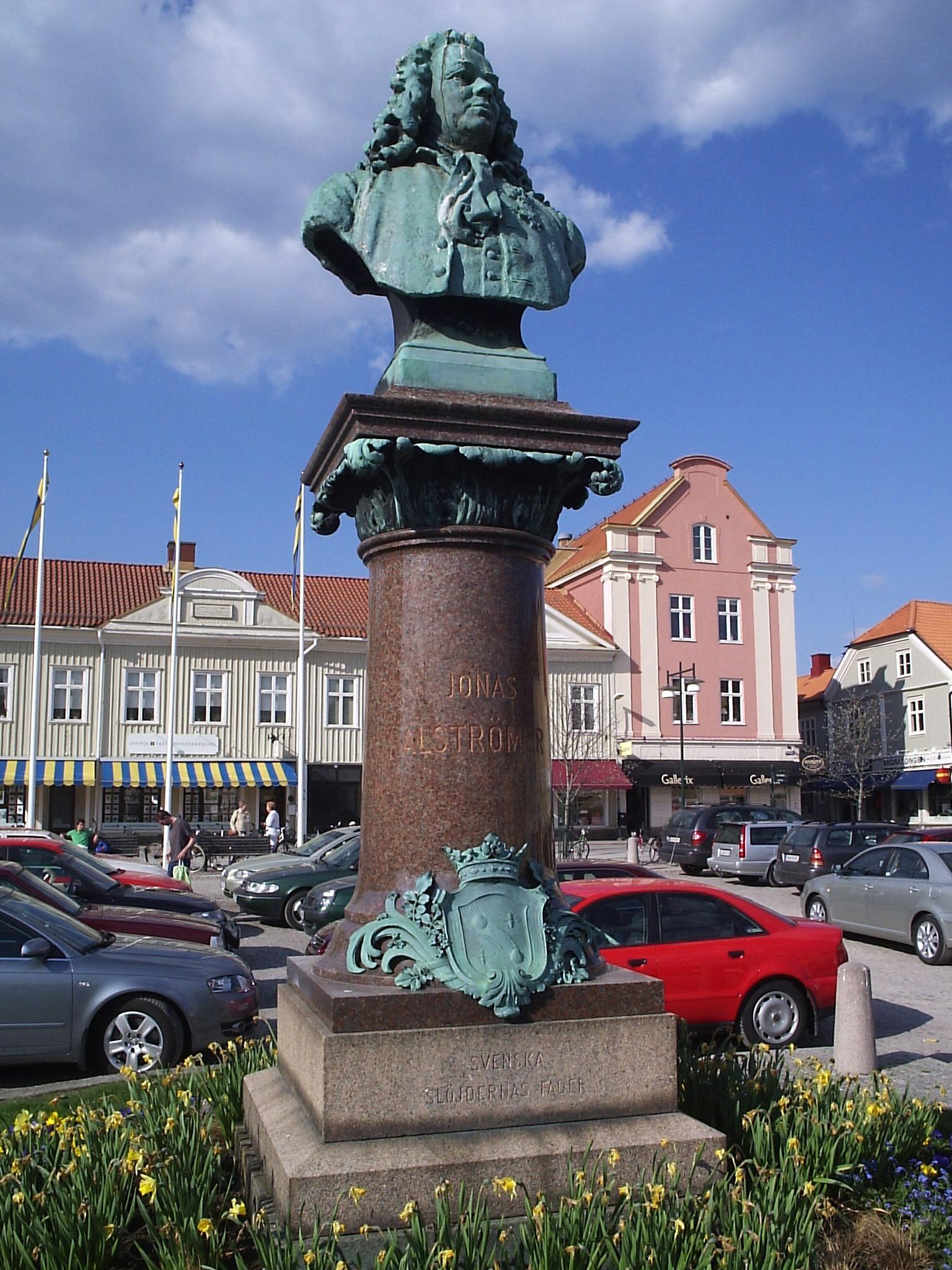
Bust of Jonas Alströmer in Alingsås

Jonas Alströmer (7 January 1685 – 2 June 1761) was a pioneer of agriculture and industry in Sweden.

Born Jonas Toresson (later changed to Alström) in the town of Alingsås in Västergötland, in 1707 he became a clerk for Stockholm merchant Alberg in London. Alberg's business failed after about three years, but Alström became a shipbroker on his own, and did very well.

Eventually he desired to establish industry back home, and in 1724 established a woolen factory in his native village, which became profitable after some initial difficulties. He then established a sugar refinery in Gothenburg, encouraged improvements in potato cultivation, tanning, cutlery, and shipbuilding.

Although Alströmer was pivotal in popularizing the cultivation of potatoes, the popular idea that he was responsible for introducing the potato in Sweden is a myth, as potatoes were grown in the Uppsala Botanical Garden (in what is now the Linnaean Garden) by Olaus Rudbeck in 1658, before Alströmer was even born. Nevertheless, Alströmer himself maintained that he had brought the potato to Sweden, and his name has remained closely associated with potatoes.

He was one of the six persons who founded the Royal Swedish Academy of Sciences in 1739. The King made him a knight of the Order of the Polar Star in 1748, and soon after with letters of nobility, changed his name to Alströmer.

Jonas Alströmer had four sons in two marriages, Patrik Alströmer, August Alströmer (father of Anna Margaretha Alströmer), Clas Alströmer and Johan Alströmer. His son Clas Alströmer was a noted naturalist.

== Memorials ==
- In 1790 he was honoured with a bust made of marble in the Stockholm Stock Exchange Building
- In 1905 he was honoured with a statue in Gothenburg
- In 1905 he was honoured with a bust in his hometown of Alingsås
- In 1961 a postage stamp marked the 200th anniversary of his passing.
