= Norsesund =

- Location within Västra Götaland Location within Sweden
- Coordinates: 57°52′N 12°26′E
- Country: Sweden
- Province: Västergötland
- County: Västra Götaland County
- Municipality: Alingsås Municipality and Lerum Municipality

Area
  - Total: 0.65 km^{2} (0.25 sq mi)

Population (31 December 2010)
  - Total: 274
  - Density: 423/km^{2} (1,100/sq mi)
- Time zone: UTC+1 (CET)
  - Summer (DST): UTC+2 (CEST)

Norsesund is a bimunicipal locality situated in Alingsås Municipality and Lerum Municipality in Västra Götaland County, Sweden. It had 274 inhabitants in 2010.

== Subdivisions ==
Gallvik is a hamlet outside Norsesund situated in Lerum Municipality.
