= Gräfsnäs =

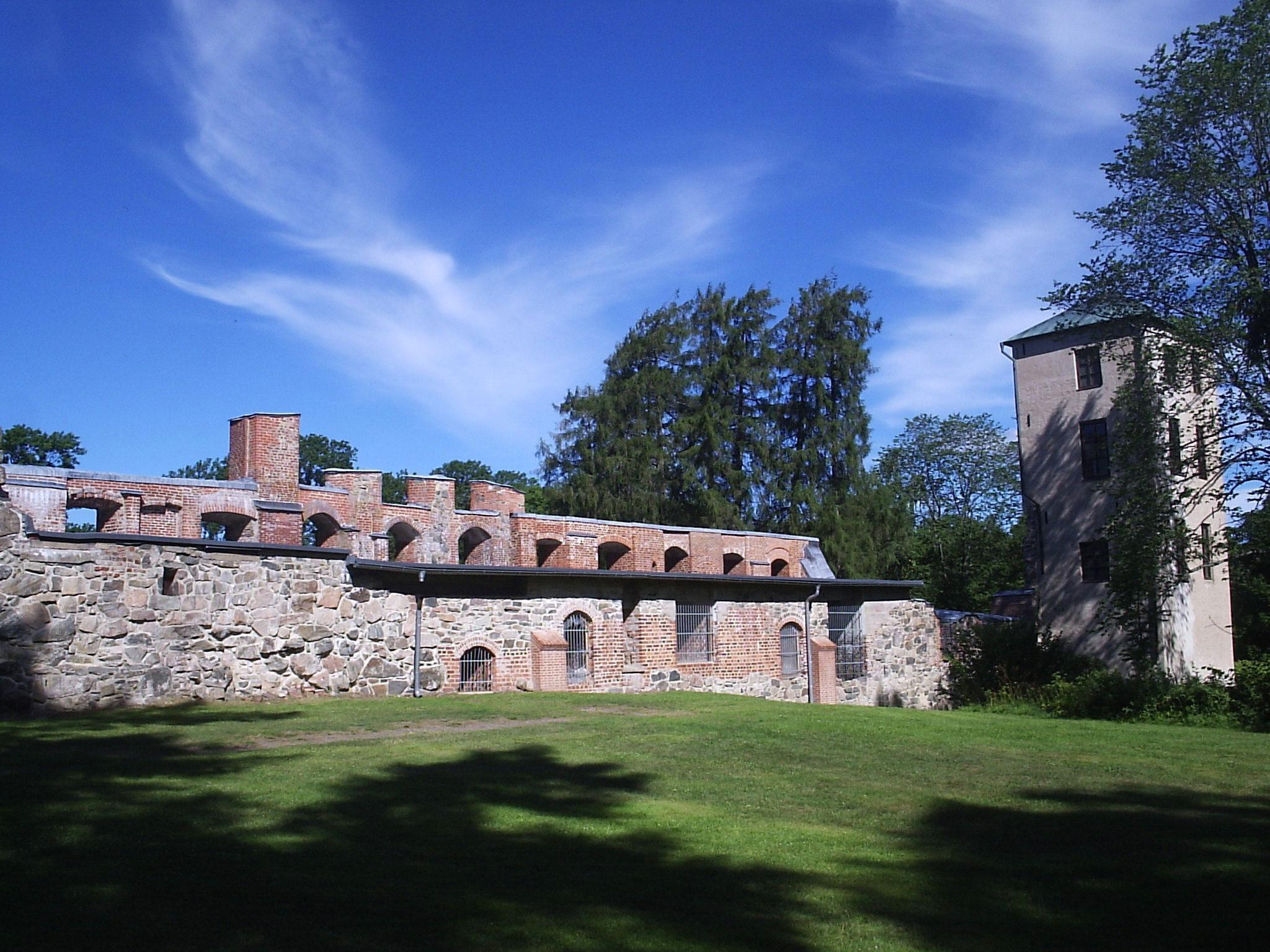

- Location within Västra Götaland Location within Sweden
- Coordinates: 58°05′N 12°29′E
- Country: Sweden
- Province: Västergötland
- County: Västra Götaland County
- Municipality: Alingsås Municipality

Area
  - Total: 0.81 km^{2} (0.31 sq mi)

Population (31 December 2010)
  - Total: 367
  - Density: 452/km^{2} (1,170/sq mi)
- Time zone: UTC+1 (CET)
  - Summer (DST): UTC+2 (CEST)

Gräfsnäs is a locality situated in Alingsås Municipality, Västra Götaland County, Sweden. It had 367 inhabitants in 2010.
