= Angered (locality) =

- Location within Västra Götaland Location within Sweden
- Coordinates: 57°47′N 12°06′E
- Country: Sweden
- Province: Västergötland
- County: Västra Götaland County
- Municipality: Göteborg Municipality

Area
  - Total: 1.60 km^{2} (0.62 sq mi)

Population (31 December 2010)
  - Total: 950
  - Density: 595/km^{2} (1,540/sq mi)
- Time zone: UTC+1 (CET)
  - Summer (DST): UTC+2 (CEST)

Angered is a locality situated in Göteborg Municipality, Västra Götaland County, Sweden. It is 12 km north of Gothenburg and it had 950 inhabitants in 2010. The locality consists of buildings adjacent to Angered Church. Commuting to Gothenburg occurs.
