= Björboholm =

- Location within Sweden
- Coordinates: 57°53′N 12°19′E
- Country: Sweden
- Province: Västergötland
- County: Västra Götaland County
- Municipality: Lerum Municipality

Area
  - Total: 1.81 km^{2} (0.70 sq mi)

Population (31 December 2010)
  - Total: 963
  - Density: 532/km^{2} (1,380/sq mi)
- Time zone: UTC+1 (CET)
  - Summer (DST): UTC+2 (CEST)

Björboholm is a locality situated in Lerum Municipality, Västra Götaland County, Sweden. It had 963 inhabitants in 2010.
