= Sollebrunn =

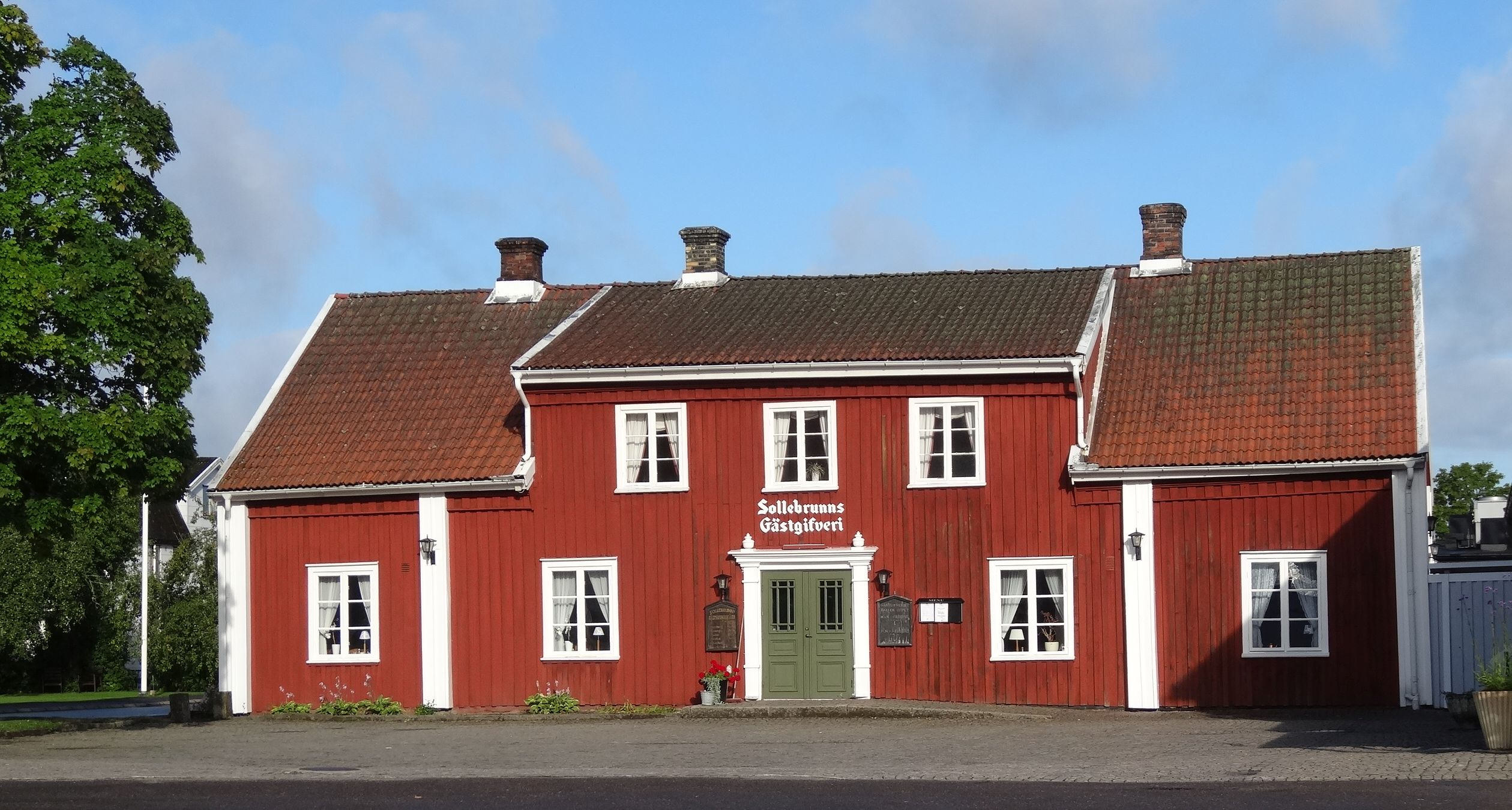
- An 18th century inn at Sollebrunn

- Location within Västra Götaland Location within Sweden
- Coordinates: 58°07′N 12°32′E
- Country: Sweden
- Province: Västergötland
- County: Västra Götaland County
- Municipality: Alingsås Municipality

Area
  - Total: 1.40 km^{2} (0.54 sq mi)

Population (31 December 2010)
  - Total: 1,440
  - Density: 1,028/km^{2} (2,660/sq mi)
- Time zone: UTC+1 (CET)
  - Summer (DST): UTC+2 (CEST)

Sollebrunn (Swedish pronunciation: [ˈsɔ̂lːɛˌbrɵn]) is a locality situated in Alingsås Municipality, Västra Götaland County, Sweden. It had 1,440 inhabitants in 2010. It is the site of Erska Church.
