= Lerum Municipality =

Lerum Municipality Lerums kommun
- Municipality
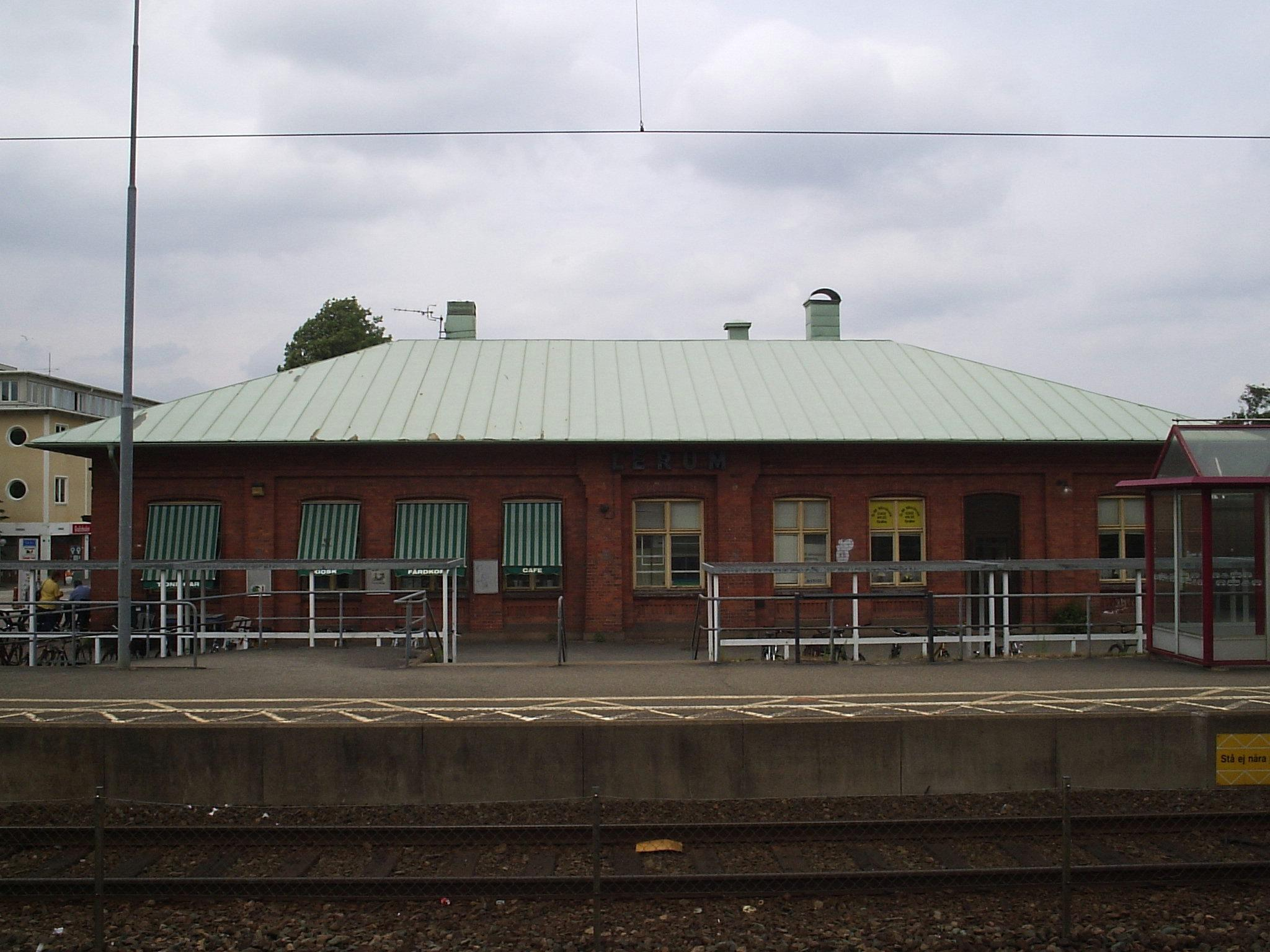
- Lerum Railway Station

- Coat of arms

- Coordinates: 57°46′N 12°18′E
- Country: Sweden
- County: Västra Götaland County
- Seat: Lerum

Area
  - Total: 308.38 km^{2} (119.07 sq mi)
  - Land: 258.61 km^{2} (99.85 sq mi)
  - Water: 49.77 km^{2} (19.22 sq mi)
- Area as of 1 January 2014.

Population (30 June 2025)
  - Total: 43,776
  - Density: 169.27/km^{2} (438.42/sq mi)
- Time zone: UTC+1 (CET)
  - Summer (DST): UTC+2 (CEST)
- ISO 3166 code: SE
- Province: Västergötland
- Municipal code: 1441
- Website: www.lerum.se
- Density is calculated using land area only.

Lerum Municipality (Swedish: Lerums kommun) is a municipality in Västra Götaland County in western Sweden, situated just east of Gothenburg. Its seat is located in the town of Lerum.

In 1969 the municipality reached its present size when "old" Lerum was amalgamated with Skallsjö and Stora Lundby.

In 2007, Lerum Municipality launched a new logotype to be used instead of its official municipal coat of arms which features the head of an ox and three oak leaves. Municipal officials and PR staff felt the coat "outdated". The new logotype featured a multi-coloured weaving pattern. Following a citizen campaign the old heraldic logotype was reinstated in 2024 and received an award in 2025.

== Localities ==
- Floda
- Gråbo
- Lerum (seat)
- Norsesund (partly)
- Stenkullen
- Tollered

== Demographics ==
This is a demographic table based on Lerum Municipality's electoral districts in the 2022 Swedish general election sourced from SVT's election platform, in turn taken from SCB official statistics.

In total there were 43,372 residents, including 31,378 Swedish citizens of voting age. 45.1% voted for the left coalition and 54.0% for the right coalition. Indicators are in percentage points except population totals and income.

Location	Residents	Citizen adults	Left vote	Right vote	Employed	Swedish parents	Foreign heritage	Income SEK	Degree
Location			%	%					
Aggetorp-Björboholm	2,110	1,483	43.3	55.5	86	80	20	30,642	42
Berghult-Ryggebol	1,215	906	40.2	59.0	86	85	15	30,754	43
Brattås-Hjällsnäs	1,516	1,148	43.8	54.6	87	85	15	29,148	40
C Floda-Nordåsen	1,779	1,329	47.3	52.4	83	84	16	29,666	49
Centrala Gråbo	2,427	1,773	43.8	54.4	80	72	28	24,786	31
Centrala Lerum	1,287	1,120	44.5	54.4	80	84	16	24,443	45
Drängsered-Hästhagen	1,893	1,348	49.1	49.4	86	88	12	29,336	52
Hyltorna-Öjared	1,780	1,328	48.6	50.6	84	87	13	29,464	55
Kyrkmossen-Lindskogen	1,490	1,000	39.7	59.7	87	86	14	31,420	45
Ljungsbacken-Stamsjön	2,249	1,560	40.4	58.8	91	91	9	39,527	72
N Aspenäs-Axåsen	1,707	1,264	41.3	58.1	89	89	11	36,892	65
N Hallsås-Höjden	2,331	1,598	42.3	56.9	88	85	15	31,962	56
Olstorp	1,745	1,233	40.3	59.0	88	82	18	31,797	41
Rydsberg-Almekärr	2,037	1,423	43.9	55.6	85	87	13	32,412	60
Sjövik	1,584	1,108	46.7	52.0	80	76	24	25,607	35
Stannum-Ljungvik	1,351	1,004	43.1	55.7	87	86	14	27,934	35
Stenkullen-Hedefors	2,240	1,576	48.5	50.4	84	82	18	27,760	43
S Aspenäs-Torpadal	2,065	1,505	40.3	59.2	87	90	10	36,097	68
Södra Hallsås	1,916	1,454	51.2	48.4	87	89	11	30,126	60
S Lerum-Slätthult	2,076	1,507	40.4	58.7	89	92	8	33,073	56
Tollered-Norsesund	1,481	1,078	57.2	42.3	85	88	12	29,547	54
Uddared-Oryd	1,700	1,174	53.3	45.4	88	91	9	33,182	64
V Hulan-Bråta	1,657	1,243	47.7	51.0	83	82	18	29,493	55
Ö Hylan-Öxeryd	1,736	1,216	47.7	51.0	88	86	14	32,572	52
Source: SVT
