= Pothole (landform) =

Natural bowl-shaped hollow carved into a streambed

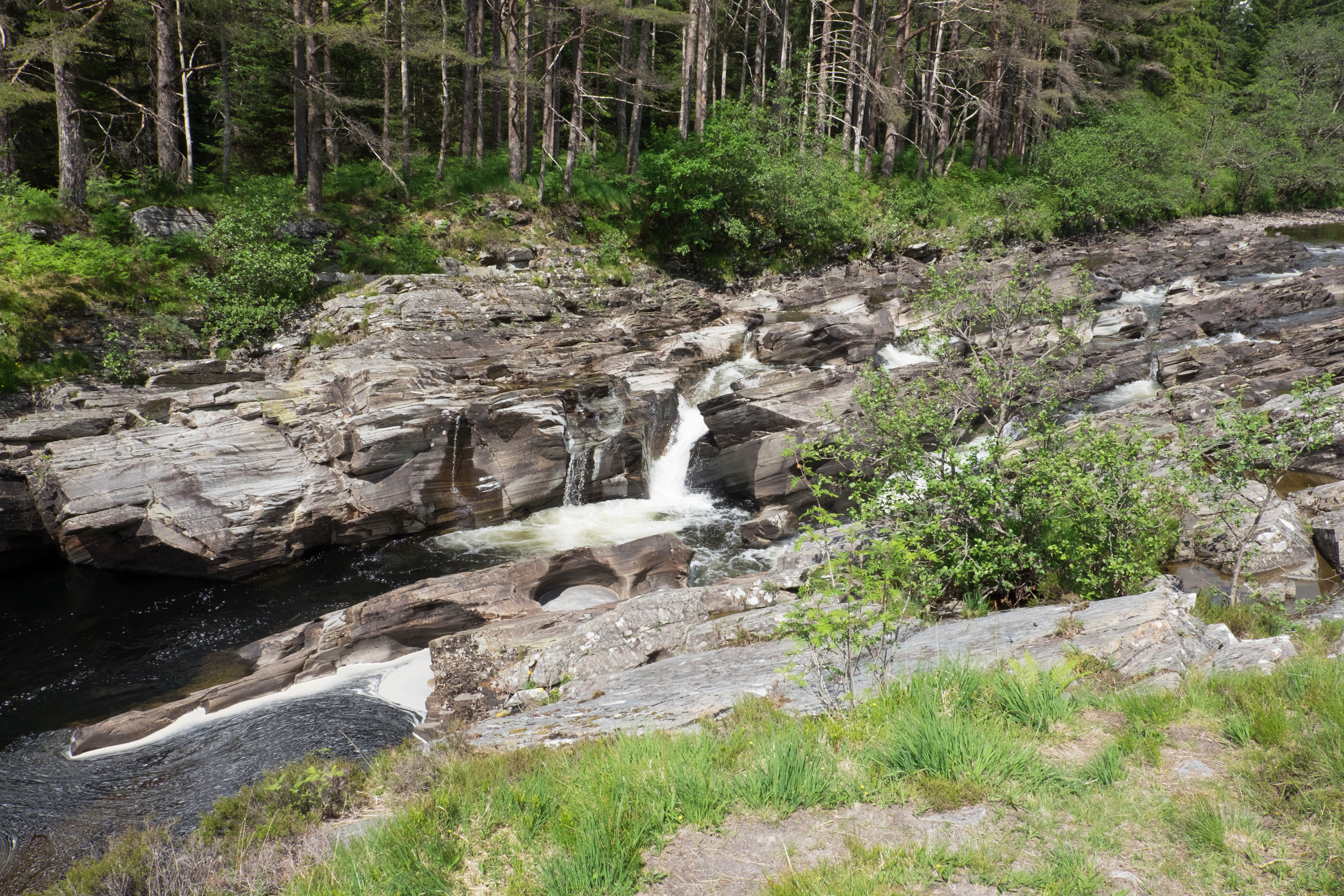
River Orchy, Scotland, showing erosion potholes in bedrock

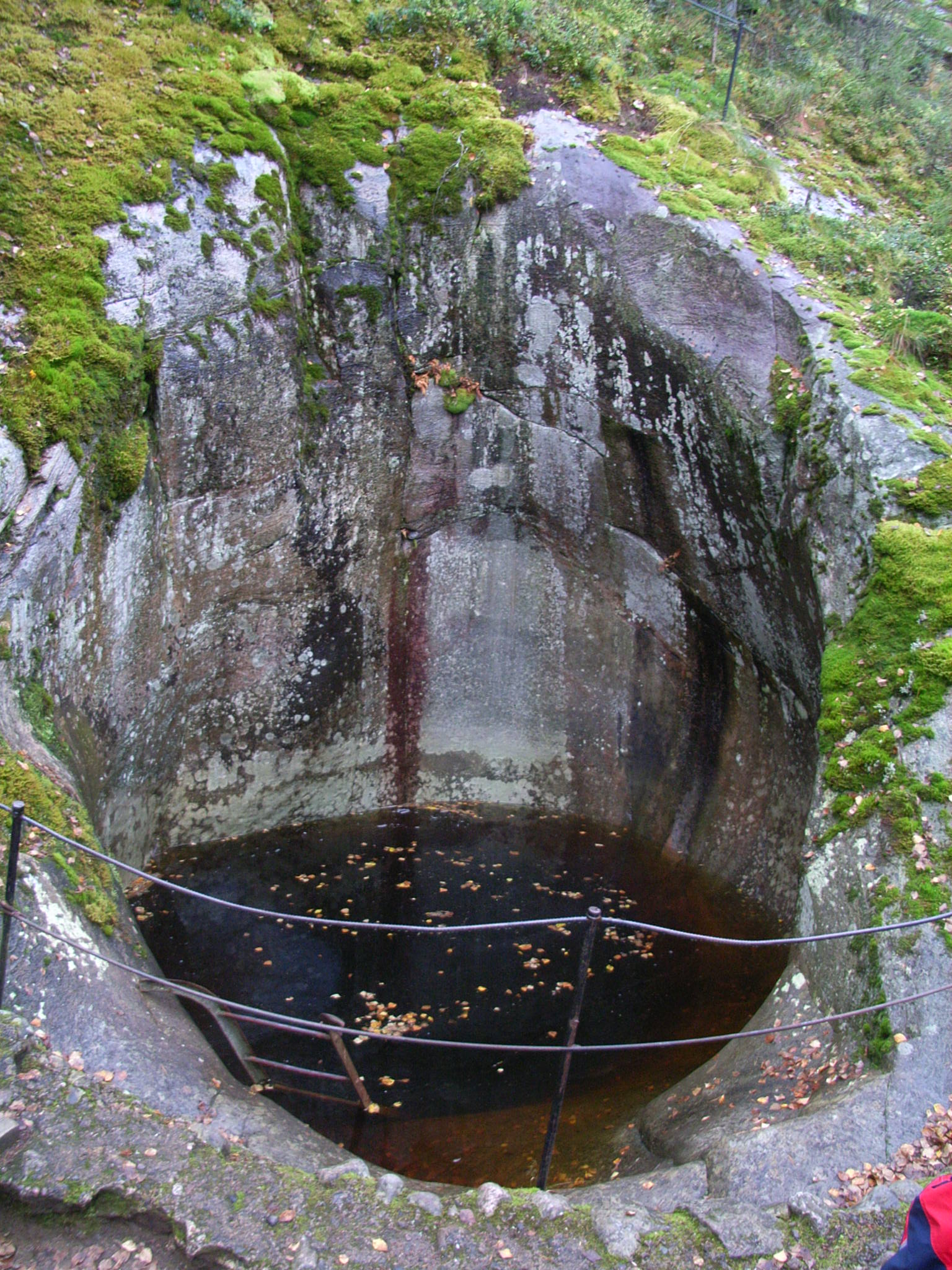
The hiidenkirnu pothole in Askola, Finland

In Earth science, a pothole is a smooth, bowl-shaped or cylindrical hollow, generally deeper than wide, found carved into the rocky bed of a watercourse. Other names used for riverine potholes are pot, (stream) kettle, giant's kettle, evorsion, hollow, rock mill, churn hole, eddy mill, and kolk. Although somewhat related to a pothole in origin, a plunge pool (or plunge basin or waterfall lake) is the deep depression in a stream bed at the base of a waterfall. It is created by the erosional forces of turbulence generated by water falling on rocks at a waterfall's base where the water impacts. Potholes are also sometimes referred to as swirlholes. This word was created to avoid confusion with an English term for a vertical or steeply inclined karstic shaft in limestone. However, given widespread usage of this term for a type of fluvial sculpted bedrock landform, pothole is preferred in usage to swirlhole.

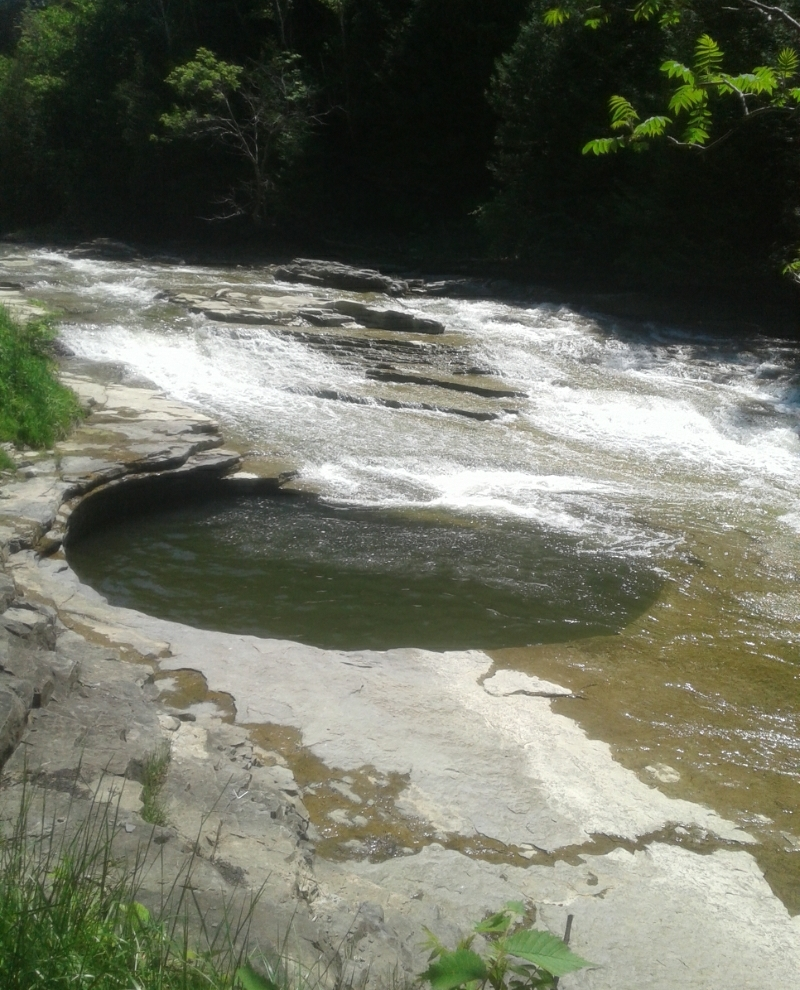
The "pot that washes itself" located just south of the village of Canajoharie

The term pothole is also used to refer to other types of depressions and basins that differ in origin. For example, some authors refer to panholes found in the Colorado Plateau also as potholes. Other terms used for panholes are gnamma (Australia), Opferkessel (German; “sacrificial cauldron”), armchair hollows, weathering pans (or pits) and solution pans or solution pits. In another case, the term pothole is used to refer to a shallow depression, generally less than 10-acre (4.0 ha) in area that occurs between dunes or on subdued morainic relief on a prairie, as in Minnesota and the Dakotas, and often contains an intermittent pond or marsh that serves as a nesting place for waterfowl.

== Origin ==
The consensus of geomorphologists and sedimentologists is that fluvial potholes are created by the grinding action of either a stone or stones or coarse sediment (sand, gravel, pebbles, boulders), whirled around and kept in motion by eddies within and force of the stream current in a given spot. Being a spectacular feature of bedrock river channels, they have been and still are studied extensively and considered as a key factor in bedrock channel development and morphology and important factor in the incision of bedrock channels.
