= Alingsås Municipality =

Alingsås Municipality Alingsås kommun
- Municipality
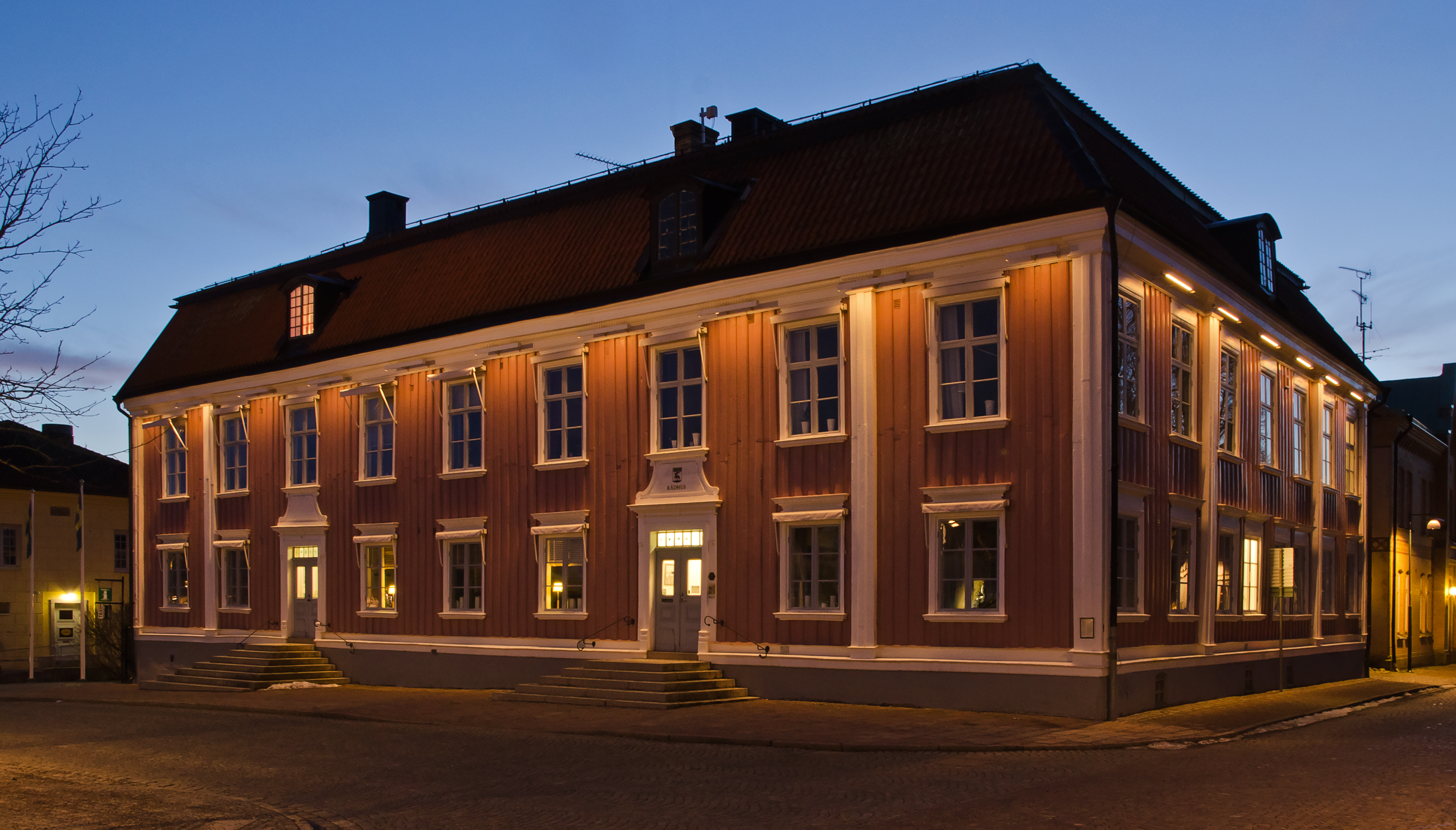
- Alingsås town hall

- Coat of arms

- Coordinates: 57°56′N 12°32′E
- Country: Sweden
- County: Västra Götaland County
- Seat: Alingsås

Area
  - Total: 551.17 km^{2} (212.81 sq mi)
  - Land: 472.03 km^{2} (182.25 sq mi)
  - Water: 79.14 km^{2} (30.56 sq mi)
- Area as of 1 January 2014.

Population (30 June 2025)
  - Total: 42,871
  - Density: 90.823/km^{2} (235.23/sq mi)
- Time zone: UTC+1 (CET)
  - Summer (DST): UTC+2 (CEST)
- ISO 3166 code: SE
- Province: Västergötland
- Municipal code: 1489
- Website: www.alingsas.se
- Density is calculated using land area only.

Alingsås Municipality (Swedish: Alingsås kommun) is a municipality in Västra Götaland County in western Sweden. Its seat is located in the city of Alingsås.

== History ==
The present municipality was formed in 1974 then the former City of Alingsås (itself a municipality of unitary type since the subdivision reform of 1971) was amalgamated with Bjärke and Hemsjö.

The two highest-ranking politicians of the municipality resigned in January 2025 after reporting by Göteborgs-Posten about alleged inappropriate content in secret group chats.

== Location, population ==
Alingsås is part (together with 12 other municipalities) of the Gothenburg Metropolitan Area with 900,000 inhabitants. As of 31 December 2021 Alingsås Municipality had 41,853 inhabitants, most of which lived in Alingsås city (ca 25,000).

== Demographics ==
This is a demographic table based on Alingsås Municipality's electoral districts in the 2022 Swedish general election sourced from SVT's election platform, in turn taken from SCB official statistics.

In total there were 41,777 residents, including 31,871 Swedish citizens of voting age. 49.1% voted for the left coalition and 49.4% for the right coalition. Indicators are in percentage points except population totals and income.

Location	Residents	Citizen adults	Left vote	Right vote	Employed	Swedish parents	Foreign heritage	Income SEK	Degree
Location			%	%					
Anten/Gräfsnäs	1,128	892	46.3	50.8	83	88	12	25,572	40
Bälinge/Gråbo	1,173	888	50.8	48.0	87	89	11	27,542	44
Centrum N	1,837	1,598	48.6	49.8	84	87	13	24,145	40
Centrum S/Tuvebo	1,889	1,594	50.3	48.7	83	87	13	24,963	39
Dammen/Prästeryd	2,201	1,681	51.6	47.5	89	90	10	31,086	56
Erska/Sollebrunn	1,928	1,443	44.0	54.6	82	87	13	23,944	27
Hemsjö S	1,703	1,343	42.5	56.5	87	92	8	29,075	41
Hemsjö/V Bodarne	1,719	1,286	50.9	48.3	85	91	9	31,857	61
Ingared	1,924	1,344	52.6	46.5	90	90	10	30,612	58
Kullingsberg/Hedvigsberg	2,269	1,593	50.0	49.5	86	87	13	31,416	58
Kvarnbacken	1,636	1,210	52.3	46.6	90	86	14	29,486	51
Långared	1,345	1,014	38.7	59.7	86	91	9	26,482	42
Nolby V/Bolltorp	1,974	1,481	52.4	46.5	86	84	16	27,044	41
Nolby Ö/Rödene	1,402	1,118	52.9	45.5	88	88	12	26,070	43
Noltorp V	1,817	1,368	59.6	38.5	73	67	33	20,513	36
Noltorp Ö	1,342	1,006	55.6	41.2	71	66	34	20,297	31
Stadsskogen/Lövekulle	2,155	1,558	43.2	55.8	88	85	15	32,391	56
Stockslycke/Holmalund	1,976	1,525	51.0	45.7	71	71	29	21,879	28
Stora Mellby/Magra	1,751	1,320	38.8	59.7	85	93	7	24,714	29
Sörhaga	1,652	1,409	47.5	50.7	83	89	11	27,532	50
Tegelbruket/Simmenäs	1,634	1,196	46.7	52.6	87	85	15	28,645	44
Ängabo/Maryd	1,688	1,239	53.1	46.0	88	88	12	29,154	50
Ödenäs/Skaftared	1,787	1,359	42.4	55.6	85	89	11	27,155	44
Östlyckan/Brogården	1,847	1,406	56.9	41.0	70	62	38	20,575	28
Source: SVT

== Sister cities ==
Alingsås has seven sister cities:

- Leisi, Estonia
- Karis, Finland
- Kartong, Gambia
- Mont-de-Marsan, France
- Ocatal, Nicaragua
- Skedsmo, Norway
- Tårnby, Denmark
