= 2019 Damallsvenskan =

32nd season of top women's football league in Sweden

Damallsvenskan
- Season: 2019
- Champions: FC Rosengård
- Relegated: IF Limhamn Bunkeflo; Kungsbacka DFF
- Champions League: FC Rosengård; Kopparbergs/Göteborg FC
- Matches: 132
- Top goalscorer: Anna Anvegård (14 goals)
- Biggest home win: 6 goals: GÖT 6–0 KUN (10 Aug)
- Biggest away win: 5 goals: KUN 0–5 KRI (20 Jul)
- Highest scoring: 10 goals: VÄX 5–5 KUN (23 Sep)
- Highest attendance: 3,262; ROS 0–0 VIT (20 Oct)
- Lowest attendance: 103; LIM 1–1 ESK (5 May)
- All statistics correct as of 20 October 2019.

The 2019 Damallsvenskan was the 32nd season of the Swedish women's association football top division, Damallsvenskan. It began on 13 April 2019, and ended on 26 October. Kopparbergs/Göteborg FC are the defending champions, having won the competition in 2018.

Kungsbacka DFF and KIF Örebro DFF were promoted from 2018 Elitettan after finishing first and second respectively. Kungsbacka makes their first appearance in Damallsvenskan.

All matches can be viewed worldwide for a fee at Damallsvenskan TV.

On 20 October, the winner of Damallsvenskan was settled, when FC Rosengård netted one point in the league table and gained an impregnable lead with one remaining round against then relatively new closest competitor Kopparbergs/Göteborg FC. This is their 10th win of Damallsvenskan, the first club to achieve that. They immediately put a star on top of their emblem to mark this. Vittsjö GIK had held the second place for some time but failed to hold on to it at the end.

== Teams ==
Locations of the 2019 Damallsvenskan. Kungsbacka is marked on Påskbergsvallen in Varberg.

Team	Location	Stadium	Turf	Stadium capacity^{1}
Djurgårdens IF	Stockholm	Stockholm Olympic Stadium	Natural	14,417
Eskilstuna United DFF	Eskilstuna	Tunavallen	Artificial	7,600
FC Rosengård	Malmö	Malmö IP	Artificial	5,700
IF Limhamn Bunkeflo (LB07)	Malmö	Limhamns IP	Artificial	2,800
KIF Örebro DFF	Örebro	Behrn Arena	Artificial	12,624
Kopparbergs/Göteborg FC	Gothenburg	Valhalla IP	Artificial	4,000
Kristianstads DFF	Kristianstad	Kristianstads fotbollsarena Vilans IP	Hybrid; Natural	3080; 5000
Linköpings FC	Linköping	Arena Linköping	Artificial	8,500
Piteå IF	Piteå	LF Arena	Artificial	3,000
Vittsjö GIK	Vittsjö	Vittsjö IP	Natural	3,000
Växjö DFF	Växjö	Myresjöhus Arena	Artificial	12,173
Kungsbacka DFF	Kungsbacka	Påskbergsvallen^{2}	Natural	n/a

Notes: ^{1} According to each club information page previously available at the Swedish Football Association website for Damallsvenskan. Since May 2018 this is no longer present.
^{2} Kungsbacka DFF's home arena is really Tingbergsvallen, but because it didn't meet the requirements for Damallsvenskan, and SvFF did not grant dispensation, where particularly the lack of lightning was deemed unacceptable considering all games are broadcast, they had to relocate their games to Påskbergsvallen about 50 km away, in Varberg, instead.

== League table ==
Pos	Team	Pld	W	D	L	GF	GA	GD	Pts	Qualification or relegation
1	FC Rosengård (Q)	22	14	7	1	51	16	+35	49	Qualification to 2020–21 Champions League
2	Kopparbergs/Göteborg FC^{R} (Q)	22	13	6	3	45	19	+26	45	Qualification to 2020–21 Champions League
3	Vittsjö GIK	22	12	5	5	33	13	+20	41	
4	Eskilstuna United DFF	22	11	5	6	34	19	+15	38	
5	Linköpings FC	22	10	6	6	37	20	+17	36	
6	Piteå IF^{C}	22	8	10	4	30	21	+9	34	
7	Kristianstads DFF	22	9	6	7	38	30	+8	33	
8	KIF Örebro DFF^{P2}	22	9	3	10	28	30	−2	30	
9	Växjö DFF	22	6	7	9	25	40	−15	25	
10	Djurgårdens IF	22	4	2	16	24	49	−25	14	
11	IF Limhamn Bunkeflo	22	3	5	14	16	46	−30	14	Relegation to Elitettan
12	Kungsbacka DFF^{P1} (R)	22	1	2	19	14	72	−58	5	Relegation to Elitettan

Updated to match(es) played on 6 November 2019. Source: svenskfotboll.se
Rules for classification: 1) Points; 2) Goal difference; 3) Number of goals scored; 4) Head-to-head points; 5) Head-to-head goal difference; 6) Head-to-head away goals scored
(Q) Qualified for the phase indicated; (R) Relegated

^{C} Last season's champion.
^{R} Last season's runner up.
^{P1} Promoted to Damallsvenskan from last season's Elitettan, finishing first there.
^{P2} Promoted to Damallsvenskan from last season's Elitettan, finishing second there.

== Top scorers ==
As of 20 October 2019.

Rank	Player	Club	Goals
1	(Sweden) Anna Anvegård	Växjö DFF and FC Rosengård	14 (Note: 5 for Växjö and 9 for Rosengård.)
2	(Sweden) Rebecka Blomqvist	Kopparbergs/Göteborg FC	13
3	(Sweden) Therese Ivarsson	Kristianstads DFF	11
3	(Sweden) Mia Jalkerud	Djurgårdens IF	11
5	(Norway) Lisa-Marie Utland (Note: Lisa-Marie Utland left Damallsvenskan midseason.)	FC Rosengård	9
5	(Sweden) Michelle De Jongh	Vittsjö GIK	9
5	(Sweden) Pauline Hammarlund	Kopparbergs/Göteborg FC	9
8	(Sweden) Felicia Rogic	Eskilstuna United DFF	8
8	(Sweden) Mimmi Larsson	Linköpings FC	8
8	(Sweden) Julia Karlernäs	Piteå IF	8
8	(Sweden) Lina Hurtig	Linköpings FC	8
12	(Sweden) Amanda Edgren	Kristianstads DFF	7
12	(Sweden) Clara Markstedt	Vittsjö GIK	7
12	(Sweden) Loreta Kullashi	Eskilstuna United DFF	7
12	(Sweden) Madelen Janogy	Piteå IF	7
12	(Sweden) Sophie Sundqvist	IF Limhamn Bunkeflo	7
12	(Sweden) Stina Blackstenius	Linköpings FC	7
12	Heather Williams	KIF Örebro DFF	7

=== Goal of the week ===
Rank	Player	Club	Score	Result	Opponent
1	Not awarded				
2	Ebba Hed	Vittsjö GIK	1–0	1–1	Eskilstuna United DFF
3	Tabitha Chawinga	Kvarnsvedens IK	2–3	3–3	Kopparbergs/Göteborg FC
4	Emma Jansson	KIF Örebro DFF	1–0	1–2	Eskilstuna United DFF
5	Tabitha Chawinga	Kvarnsvedens IK	1–1	2–3	Vittsjö GIK
6	Cecilia Pedersen	IF Limhamn Bunkeflo	1–0	2–1	Djurgårdens IF
7	Hanna Sandström	Kristianstads DFF	1–0	1–0	Piteå IF
8	Filippa Angeldal	Hammarby IF	1–3	3–3	Kopparbergs/Göteborg FC
9	Lieke Martens	FC Rosengård	1–0	3–0	Vittsjö GIK
10	Marija Banušić	Linköpings FC	1–0	2–0	Vittsjö GIK
11	Hanna Terry	KIF Örebro DFF	2–1	2–1	Djurgårdens IF
12	Marija Banušić	Linköpings FC	2–0	5–0	KIF Örebro DFF
13	Josefin Johansson	Piteå IF	1–0	3–2	Linköpings FC
14	Kristine Minde	Linköpings FC	1–0	2–0	Kopparbergs/Göteborg FC
15	Marija Banušić	Linköpings FC	2–0	2–2	FC Rosengård
16	Elin Bragnum	Piteå IF	1–0	2–0	Hammarby IF
17	Tine Schryvers	Kristianstads DFF	2–1	2–1	FC Rosengård
18	Olivia Schough	Eskilstuna United DFF	2–1	2–1	Kristianstads DFF
19	Olga Ekblom	Hammarby IF	6–1	6–1	KIF Örebro DFF

== Attendance ==
=== Highest attendances ===
All games with more than 1500.

Rank	Home team	Score	Away team	Attendance	Date	Stadium
1	FC Rosengård	1–1	Vittsjö GIK	3,262	20 October 2019	Malmö IP
2	Linköpings FC	0–0	Kristianstads DFF	2,866	5 May 2019	Linköping Arena
3	FC Rosengård	3–3	Linköpings FC	2,398	13 October 2019	Malmö IP
4	Linköpings FC	0–0	FC Rosengård	2,384	20 May 2019	Linköping Arena
5	Eskilstuna United DFF	2–0	Linköpings FC	2,379	22 July 2019	Tunavallen
6	Piteå IF	1–1	FC Rosengård	1,978	25 August 2019	LF Arena
7	Piteå IF	0–3	KIF Örebro DFF	1,876	21 July 2019	LF Arena
8	Piteå IF	1–0	Djurgårdens IF	1,822	14 April 2019	LF Arena
9	Piteå IF	3–1	Eskilstuna United DFF	1,779	4 August 2019	LF Arena
10	Piteå IF	1–0	Linköpings FC	1,748	22 September 2019	LF Arena
11	Vittsjö GIK	2–0	Kristianstads DFF	1,663	13 October 2019	Vittsjö IP
12	Eskilstuna United DFF	1–0	Kopparbergs/Göteborg FC	1,646	7 September 2019	Tunavallen
13	FC Rosengård	3–0	Växjö DFF	1,644	21 July 2019	Malmö IP
14	FC Rosengård	3–0	IF Limhamn Bunkeflo	1,586	14 August 2019	Malmö IP
15	IF Limhamn Bunkeflo	3–2	FC Rosengård	1,536	11 May 2019	Limhamns IP
16	Kristianstads DFF	0–3	Vittsjö GIK	1,527	26 July 2019	Kristianstads Fotbollsarena
17	Piteå IF	0–0	Vittsjö GIK	1,519	14 August 2019	LF Arena
18	Eskilstuna United DFF	1–0	KIF Örebro DFF	1,511	15 May 2019	Tunavallen
19	Djurgårdens IF	0–3	Eskilstuna United DFF	1,511	28 July 2019	Tele2 Arena

Updated to games played on 20 October 2019.
