= 2022 Damallsvenskan =

Damallsvenskan
- Season: 2022
- Dates: 26 March 2022 – 5 November 2022
- Champions: Rosengård
- Relegated: AIK; Umeå
- Champions League: Rosengård; Häcken; Linköping
- Matches: 182
- Goals: 559 (3.07 per match)
- Top goalscorer: Amalie Jørgensen Vangsgaard (22)
- Biggest home win: Linköping 7–0 Umeå; 19 June 2022
- Biggest away win: Kalmar 0-6 Rosengård; 8 June 2022; AIK 0-6 Rosengård; 19 June 2022
- Highest scoring: AIK 2-6 Kristianstad; 10 September 2022; Rosengård 6-2 Kalmar; 16 September 2022; Häcken 7-1 AIK; 31 October 2022
- Longest winning run: Häcken; Kristianstad (9 matches)
- Longest unbeaten run: Rosengård (15 matches)
- Longest winless run: Umeå (16 matches)
- Longest losing run: AIK (11 matches)
- Highest attendance: 7,877; Hammarby v Eskilstuna; 26 March 2022
- Lowest attendance: 100; AIK v Umeå; 21 August 2022
- All statistics correct as of 5 November 2022.

The 2022 Damallsvenskan was the 35th season of the Swedish women's association football top division, Damallsvenskan. The league began on 26 March 2022, and ended on 5 November 2022.

IF Brommapojkarna, IFK Kalmar and Umeå IK were new teams for this season.

== Teams ==
Location of teams in 2022 Damallsvenskan

Team	Location	Stadium	Turf	Stadium capacity^{a}
AIK	Stockholm	Skytteholms IP	Artificial	5,200
BK Häcken FF	Gothenburg	Bravida Arena	Artificial	6,500
Djurgårdens IF	Stockholm	Stockholm Olympic Stadium	Natural	14,417
Eskilstuna United DFF	Eskilstuna	Tunavallen	Artificial	7,600
FC Rosengård	Malmö	Malmö IP	Artificial	5,700
Hammarby IF	Stockholm	Hammarby IP	Artificial	3,700
IF Brommapojkarna	Stockholm	Grimsta IP	Artificial	5,000
IFK Kalmar	Kalmar	Guldfågeln Arena	Natural	12,000
KIF Örebro DFF	Örebro	Behrn Arena	Artificial	12,624
Kristianstads DFF	Kristianstad	Kristianstads fotbollsarena	Hybrid	3,080^{b}
Kristianstads DFF	Kristianstad	Vilans IP	Natural	5,000^{b}
Linköpings FC	Linköping	Arena Linköping	Artificial	8,500
Piteå IF	Piteå	LF Arena	Artificial	3,000
Umeå IK	Umeå	Umeå Energi Arena	Artificial	10,000
Vittsjö GIK	Vittsjö	Vittsjö IP	Natural	3,000

Notes: ^{a} According to each club information page previously available at the Swedish Football Association website for Damallsvenskan, unless otherwise noted. Since May 2018 this is no longer present. Numbers were usually lower than official stadium numbers.
^{b} According to Kristianstads DFF's history web page.

== Standings ==
Pos	Team	Pld	W	D	L	GF	GA	GD	Pts	Qualification or relegation
1	FC Rosengård (C)	26	21	3	2	74	24	+50	66	Qualification to Champions League second round
2	BK Häcken	26	18	5	3	65	22	+43	59	Qualification to Champions League second round
3	Linköpings FC	26	18	3	5	61	26	+35	57	Qualification to Champions League first round
4	Kristianstads DFF	26	16	4	6	57	28	+29	52	
5	Hammarby	26	15	3	8	43	29	+14	48	
6	Vittsjö GIK	26	13	6	7	40	26	+14	45	
7	Piteå IF	26	12	4	10	34	26	+8	40	
8	Eskilstuna United DFF	26	12	4	10	33	32	+1	40	
9	KIF Örebro DFF	26	12	2	12	37	37	0	38	
10	Djurgårdens IF	26	8	2	16	31	48	−17	26	
11	IFK Kalmar	26	5	4	17	25	64	−39	19	
12	IF Brommapojkarna	26	3	3	20	20	60	−40	12	Qualification for the relegation play-offs
13	Umeå IK	26	3	3	20	21	68	−47	12	Relegation to Elitettan
14	AIK	26	2	2	22	18	69	−51	8	Relegation to Elitettan

Source: svenskfotboll.se
Rules for classification: 1) Points; 2) Goal difference; 3) Number of goals scored; 4) Head-to-head points; 5) Head-to-head goal difference; 6) Head-to-head away goals scored
(C) Champions

== Results ==
Home \ Away	AIK	IBP	DIF	ESK	HÄK	HAM	KAL	KRI	LIN	ORE	PIT	ROS	UME	VIT
AIK		0–2	2–4	1–2	0–3	0–1	1–2	2–6	0–4	2–0	1–0	0–6	0–0	0–3
Brommapojkarna	1–1		1–1	1–3	1–5	0–2	2–3	1–2	1–5	1–2	0–1	0–3	3–0	1–3
Djurgårdens IF	4–2	2–1		2–0	1–3	1–2	4–0	1–0	1–2	1–2	1–4	2–5	3–0	0–3
Eskilstuna	1–0	3–0	1–0		1–2	0–1	1–0	1–1	0–2	2–0	1–3	0–3	4–2	0–0
BK Häcken	7–1	1–0	0–0	0–1		4–1	3–1	3–1	2–0	6–0	3–1	2–2	5–0	2–3
Hammarby	2–0	4–1	3–0	0–3	1–2		4–0	0–2	0–1	0–0	1–0	2–0	2–0	2–2
IFK Kalmar	3–1	1–0	0–1	1–1	1–2	1–5		0–2	1–4	0–4	0–1	0–6	3–2	0–1
Kristianstad	5–1	4–1	4–0	2–2	1–2	3–1	4–0		1–0	3–0	1–0	0–2	4–1	1–0
Linköpings FC	2–1	4–0	2–1	5–2	1–5	3–1	2–2	4–1		1–0	2–0	3–4	7–0	1–1
KIF Örebro DFF	5–1	4–0	2–0	1–0	0–1	0–1	4–2	3–2	0–0		0–1	2–4	2–0	0–1
Piteå IF	1–0	0–0	3–0	1–2	1–1	1–1	1–0	2–2	0–1	4–1		2–1	3–1	1–2
FC Rosengård	2–1	2–0	3–0	1–0	2–0	4–1	6–2	1–1	1–0	2–0	2–1		5–2	3–2
Umeå IK	2–0	1–2	2–1	1–2	1–1	0–3	1–1	0–2	0–3	1–3	0–1	0–3		4–0
Vittsjö GIK	1–0	3–0	1–0	2–0	0–0	1–2	1–1	0–2	1–2	1–2	2–1	1–1	5–0	

Updated to match(es) played on 5 November 2022. Source: svenskfotboll.se (in Swedish)
Legend: Blue = home team win; Yellow = draw; Red = away team win.

== Relegation play-offs ==
The 12th-placed team of Damallsvenskan will meet the third-placed team from 2022 Elitettan in a two-legged tie on a home-and-away basis with the team from Damallsvenskan finishing at home.

20 November 2022	Uppsala	0–1	Brommapojkarna	Uppsala
15:00 CET	Selberg (yellow card) 18'	Report	Selberg 19' (o.g.)	Stadium: Studenternas IP; Attendance: 653; Referee: Eva Svärdsudd

27 November 2022	Brommapojkarna	3–1	Uppsala	Vällingby
15:00 CET	Ahlberg 5'; Johansson Prakt 9'; Andrup 63'	Report	Robertson (yellow card) 6'; Thorisson 62'	Stadium: Grimsta IP; Attendance: 404; Referee: Sara Persson

Brommapojkarna won 4–1 on aggregate and will remain in Damallsvenskan for the 2023 season.

=== Positions by Round ===
The table lists the positions of teams after each week of matches. In order to preserve chronological progress, any matches moved from their original game round are not included in the round at which they were originally scheduled, but added to the full round they were played immediately afterwards. For example, if a match is scheduled for round 13, but then postponed and played between rounds 16 and 17, it will be added to the standings for round 16.

Team ╲ Round	1	2	3	4	5	6	7	8	9	10	11	12	13	14	15	16	17	18	19	20	21	22	23	24	25	26
FC Rosengård	4	5	2	3	2	1	1	1	1	1	1	1	1	1	1	1	1	1	1	1	1	1	1	1	1	1
BK Häcken	9	3	1	1	1	4	2	2	2	2	3	2	4	4	4	4	4	4	4	4	4	4	3	2	2	2
Linköpings FC	7	4	3	2	4	3	4	3	3	3	2	3	2	2	3	3	2	2	2	2	2	3	2	3	3	3
Kristianstads DFF	1	1	5	7	6	8	7	7	6	6	5	4	3	3	2	2	3	3	3	3	3	2	4	4	4	4
Hammarby	13	14	12	13	9	12	11	10	10	8	7	7	7	7	7	6	5	5	5	5	5	5	5	5	6	5
Vittsjö GIK	8	11	13	8	7	6	8	6	5	5	4	5	5	5	6	7	6	7	6	7	8	7	6	6	5	6
Piteå IF	2	2	6	6	3	2	3	5	7	7	9	8	9	8	9	8	8	8	8	6	6	6	7	8	8	7
Eskilstuna United DFF	3	6	7	5	8	5	5	4	4	4	6	6	6	6	5	5	7	6	7	8	7	8	8	7	7	8
KIF Örebro DFF	10	9	4	4	5	7	6	8	9	10	8	10	10	10	10	10	10	10	9	9	9	9	9	9	9	9
Djurgårdens IF	12	13	14	14	13	10	9	9	8	9	10	9	8	9	8	9	9	9	10	10	10	10	10	10	10	10
IFK Kalmar	14	10	11	12	10	11	12	12	13	11	11	11	11	11	11	11	11	11	11	11	11	11	11	11	11	11
IF Brommapojkarna	11	7	9	10	12	13	13	13	12	13	13	13	13	13	13	13	14	14	13	12	12	12	13	13	12	12
Umeå IK	6	12	8	9	11	9	10	11	11	12	12	12	12	12	12	12	12	12	12	13	13	13	12	12	13	13
AIK	5	8	10	11	14	14	14	14	14	14	14	14	14	14	14	14	13	13	14	14	14	14	14	14	14	14

Leader and Champions League second round
Champions League second round
Champions League first round
Relegation play-offs
Elitettan

Updated to match(es) played on 5 November 2022. Source:

=== Results by round ===
Team ╲ Round	1	2	3	4	5	6	7	8	9	10	11	12	13	14	15	16	17	18	19	20	21	22	23	24	25	26
AIK	W	L	L	L	L	L	L	L	L	L	L	L	W	L	L	L	D	D	L	L	L	L	L	L	L	L
IF Brommapojkarna	L	W	L	L	L	L	L	L	W	L	L	L	L	L	L	L	L	D	D	D	L	L	L	L	W	L
Djurgårdens IF	L	L	L	L	W	W	W	W	L	L	D	W	W	L	W	L	L	L	L	D	L	W	L	L	L	L
Eskilstuna United DFF	W	L	D	W	L	W	W	W	W	L	L	D	W	W	W	L	L	W	L	L	W	D	L	W	D	L
BK Häcken	D	W	W	W	D	D	W	W	W	D	D	W	L	L	W	W	L	W	W	W	W	W	W	W	W	W
Hammarby	L	L	W	L	W	L	D	W	W	L	W	W	W	W	L	W	W	W	W	L	L	D	W	W	D	W
IFK Kalmar	L	W	L	L	W	L	L	L	L	W	L	L	L	L	L	L	D	D	L	L	L	W	L	D	D	W
Kristianstads DFF	W	D	D	L	W	L	W	D	W	W	W	W	W	W	W	W	W	L	W	W	W	D	L	L	L	W
Linköpings FC	D	W	W	W	L	W	L	W	W	W	W	L	W	W	W	W	W	L	W	W	W	L	W	D	W	D
KIF Örebro DFF	L	W	W	W	L	L	W	L	L	L	W	L	L	L	W	W	L	L	W	W	W	L	W	W	D	D
Piteå IF	W	D	L	W	W	W	L	L	L	D	L	W	L	W	L	W	W	W	D	W	W	D	L	L	L	W
FC Rosengård	W	D	W	W	D	W	W	D	W	W	W	W	W	W	W	L	W	W	L	W	W	W	W	W	W	W
Umeå IK	D	L	W	L	L	W	L	L	L	L	L	L	L	L	L	D	D	L	L	L	L	L	W	L	L	L
Vittsjö GIK	D	D	L	W	W	D	D	W	W	W	W	D	L	W	L	L	W	D	W	L	L	W	W	W	W	L

Updated to match(es) played on 5 November 2022. Source: svenskfotboll.se (in Swedish)
W = Win; D = Draw; L = Lose

== Player statistics ==
=== Top scorers ===
As of matches played on 5 November 2022

Rank	Player	Club	Goals
1	(Denmark) Amalie Jørgensen Vangsgaard	Linköping	22
2	(Canada) Évelyne Viens	Kristianstad	21
3	(United States) Tabby Tindell	Kristianstad	14
4	(Sweden) Olivia Schough	Rosengård	12
5	(Sweden) Pauline Hammarlund	Häcken	11
5	(Sweden) Madelen Janogy	Hammarby	11
7	(Iceland) Hlín Eiríksdóttir	Piteå	10
7	(Sweden) Paulina Nyström	Eskilstuna United DFF	10
7	(Finland) Jutta Rantala	Vittsjö	10
10	(Sweden) Loreta Kullashi	Rosengård	9
10	(Sweden) Mia Persson	Rosengård	9
10	(United States) Alyssa Walker	Kalmar	9

=== Top assists ===
As of matches played on 5 November 2022

Rank	Player	Club	Assists
1	(Sweden) Olivia Schough	Rosengård	12
2	(Canada) Évelyne Viens	Kristianstad	10
3	(Finland) Heidi Kollanen	Örebro	8
3	(Sweden) Loreta Kullashi	Rosengård	8
5	(Sweden) Mia Carlsson	Kristianstad	7
5	(Sweden) Alva Selerud	Linköping	7
7	(Sweden) Stina Lennartsson	Linköping	6
7	(Sweden) Clara Markstedt	Vittsjö	6
9	(Nigeria) Anam Imo	Piteå	5

==== Hat-tricks ====
Player	For	Against	Result	Date
(Sweden) Filippa Curmark	Häcken	AIK	3-0 (A)	15 April 2022
(Sweden) Mia Persson	Rosengård	Djurgårdens IF	5-2 (A)	15 April 2022
(Denmark) Amalie Jørgensen Vangsgaard	Linköping	Hammarby	3-1 (H)	20 April 2022
(Finland) Jutta Rantala	Vittsjö	AIK	3-0 (A)	24 April 2022
(Sweden) Madelen Janogy	Hammarby	Kalmar	5-1 (A)	29 May 2022
(Iceland) Hlín Eiríksdóttir	Piteå	Djurgårdens IF	3-0 (H)	13 June 2022
(Sweden) Pauline Hammarlund	Häcken	Umeå IK	5-0 (H)	9 September 2022
(Canada) Évelyne Viens^{4}	Kristianstad	AIK	6-2 (A)	10 September 2022
(Denmark) Amalie Jørgensen Vangsgaard^{4}	Linköping	Eskilstuna United DFF	5-2 (H)	11 September 2022
(Sweden) Karin Lundin	Rosengård	Kalmar	6-2 (H)	16 September 2022
(Canada) Évelyne Viens	Kristianstad	Djurgårdens IF	4-0 (H)	24 September 2022
(Denmark) Amalie Jørgensen Vangsgaard	Linköping	Kristianstad	4-1 (H)	28 October 2022
(Hungary) Anna Csiki	Häcken	AIK	7-1 (H)	31 October 2022

Notes

^{4} Player scored 4 goals
(H) – Home team
(A) – Away team

=== Clean sheets ===
Rank	Player	Club	Clean sheets
1	(Finland) Anna Tamminen	Hammarby	12
2	(Germany) Melina Loeck	Kristianstad	11
3	(Sweden) Cajsa Andersson	Linköping	10
3	(Canada) Sabrina D'Angelo	Vittsjö	10
5	(United States) Mandy McGlynn	Piteå	9
5	(Australia) Teagan Micah	Rosengård	9
7	(Sweden) Tove Enblom	Örebro	7
7	(Sweden) Jennifer Falk	Häcken	7
7	(United States) Katie Fraine	Eskilstuna	7
10	(United States) Kelsey Daugherty	Djurgården	6
11	(Sweden) Lovisa Koss	IF Brommapojkarna	3
12	(Sweden) Serina Backmark	AIK	2
12	(Sweden) Angel Mukasa	Rosengård	2
12	(New Zealand) Erin Nayler	Umeå IK	2

=== Discipline ===
==== Player ====
- Most yellow cards: 6
  - (Finland) Olga Ahtinen (Linköping)
  - (Sweden) Olivia Holm (Umeå)
  - (Sweden) Stina Lennartsson (Linköping)
  - (Sweden) Agnes Nyberg (AIK)
- Most red cards: 3
  - (Sweden) Matilda Plan (Eskilstuna)

==== Club ====
- Most yellow cards: 38
  - AIK
- Most red cards: 3
  - Eskilstuna
