= 2017 Damallsvenskan =

Damallsvenskan
- Season: 2017
- Champions: Linköpings FC
- Relegated: Kvarnsvedens IK; KIF Örebro DFF
- Champions League: Linköpings FC; FC Rosengård
- Matches: 132
- Goals: 394 (2.98 per match)
- Top goalscorer: Tabitha Chawinga (26 goals)
- Biggest home win: 5 goals: ROS 7–2 KVA (16 Apr); ROS 5–0 GÖT (7 May); KVA 5–0 LIM (3 Jun); LIN 5–0 ÖRE (18 Aug); HAM 6–1 ÖRE (14 Oct)
- Biggest away win: 6 goals: LIN 0–6 ESK (4 Nov)
- Highest scoring: 9 goals: ROS 7–2 KVA (16 Apr); ROS 6–3 DJU (8 Oct)
- Highest attendance: 7,825; LIM 0–1 ROS (30 Aug)
- Lowest attendance: 169; HAM 1–1 KRI (5 Nov)
- Total attendance: 106,791
- Average attendance: 809
- All statistics correct as of 30 March 2018.

The 2017 Damallsvenskan was the 29th season of the Swedish women's association football top division, Damallsvenskan. It began on 16 April 2017, and ended on 12 November. Linköpings FC were the defending champions, having won the competition in 2016.

On 29 October 2017, the winner of Damallsvenskan was settled, when Linköpings FC, in a goalless game against Kvarnsvedens IK, netted one point in the league table and gained an impregnable lead with two remaining rounds against main rival and closest competitor FC Rosengård. Thus Linköping successfully defended their title from last year.

== Teams ==
Locations of the 2017 Damallsvenskan

Team	Location	Stadium	Stadium capacity^{1}
Djurgårdens IF	Stockholm	Stockholm Olympic Stadium	14,417
Eskilstuna United DFF	Eskilstuna	Tunavallen	7,600
FC Rosengård	Malmö	Malmö IP	5,700
KIF Örebro DFF	Örebro	Behrn Arena	12,624
Kopparbergs/Göteborg FC	Gothenburg	Valhalla IP	4,000
Kvarnsvedens IK	Borlänge	Ljungbergsplanen	1,000
Linköpings FC	Linköping	Arena Linköping	8,500
Piteå IF	Piteå	LF Arena	3,000
Vittsjö GIK	Vittsjö	Vittsjö IP	3,000
IF Limhamn Bunkeflo	Malmö	Limhamns IP	2,800
Hammarby IF	Stockholm	Zinkensdamms IP	3,000
Kristianstads DFF	Kristianstad	Vilans IP	5,000

Note: ^{1} According to each club information page at the Swedish Football Association website for Damallsvenskan.

== League table ==
Pos	Team	Pld	W	D	L	GF	GA	GD	Pts	Qualification or relegation
1	Linköpings FC	22	16	3	3	45	24	+21	51	Qualification to 2018–19 Champions League
2	FC Rosengård	22	12	6	4	50	23	+27	42	Qualification to 2018–19 Champions League
3	Eskilstuna United DFF	22	11	5	6	37	24	+13	38	
4	Piteå IF	22	10	6	6	31	20	+11	36	
5	Kristianstads DFF	22	9	4	9	33	26	+7	31	
6	Djurgårdens IF	22	9	3	10	31	36	−5	30	
7	Hammarby IF	22	6	9	7	27	26	+1	27	
8	Kopparbergs/Göteborg FC	22	7	6	9	31	41	−10	27	
9	IF Limhamn Bunkeflo	22	8	2	12	23	43	−20	26	
10	Vittsjö GIK	22	5	8	9	24	30	−6	23	
11	Kvarnsvedens IK	22	4	7	11	41	54	−13	19	Relegation to Elitettan
12	KIF Örebro DFF	22	2	7	13	21	47	−26	13	Relegation to Elitettan

Source: soccerway.com
Rules for classification: 1) Points; 2) Goal difference; 3) Number of goals scored; 4) Head-to-head points; 5) Head-to-head goal difference; 6) Head-to-head away goals scored

== Attendance ==
=== Average home attendances ===
Team	GP	Attendance	High	Low	Average
Eskilstuna United DFF	11	17,742	2,876	722	1,612
Piteå IF	11	13,370	4,122	541	1,215
FC Rosengård	11	11,553	3,307	453	1,050
IF Limhamn Bunkeflo	11	10,769	7,825	219	979
Linköpings FC	11	10,689	2,105	518	971
Hammarby IF	11	7,828	2,137	169	711
Vittsjö GIK	11	6,241	956	353	567
Kvarnsvedens IK	11	6,200	822	343	563
Djurgårdens IF	11	5,905	2,074	186	536
Kristianstads DFF	11	5,815	1,112	266	528
Kopparbergs/Göteborg FC	11	5,442	710	325	494
KIF Örebro DFF	11	5,237	1,311	221	476
Total	132	106,791	7,825	169	809

Updated to games played on 12 November 2017.

=== Highest attendances ===
Rank	Home team	Score	Away team	Attendance	Date	Stadium
1	IF Limhamn Bunkeflo	0–1	FC Rosengård	7,825	30 August 2017	Swedbank Stadion
2	Piteå IF	0–2	FC Rosengård	4,122	29 June 2017	LF Arena
3	FC Rosengård	3–0	IF Limhamn Bunkeflo	3,307	26 June 2017	Malmö IP
4	Eskilstuna United DFF	3–2	FC Rosengård	2,876	3 May 2017	Tunavallen
5	FC Rosengård	2–2	Linköpings FC	2,541	10 September 2017	Malmö IP
6	Eskilstuna United DFF	4–1	Kvarnsvedens IK	2,369	24 May 2017	Tunavallen
7	Eskilstuna United DFF	0–2	Linköpings FC	2,325	29 June 2017	Tunavallen
8	Eskilstuna United DFF	0–1	Piteå IF	2,182	18 June 2017	Tunavallen
9	Hammarby IF	0–2	Djurgårdens IF	2,137	18 June 2017	Zinkensdamms IP
10	Linköpings FC	0–3	FC Rosengård	2,105	20 May 2017	Linköping Arena

Updated to games played on 12 November 2017.

== Top scorers ==
As of 20 November 2017.

Rank	Player	Club	Goals
1	(Malawi) Tabitha Chawinga	Kvarnsvedens IK	25
2	(Finland) Linda Sällström	Vittsjö GIK	15
3	(United States) Ella Masar	FC Rosengård	13
4	(Sweden) Marija Banušić	Linköpings FC	11
4	(Sweden) Mia Jalkerud	Djurgårdens IF	11
4	(Sweden) Pauline Hammarlund	Kopparbergs/Göteborg FC	11
4	(Sweden) Mimmi Larsson	Eskilstuna United DFF	11
8	(Sweden) Julia Zigiotti Olme	Hammarby IF	8
8	(Sweden) Olivia Schough	Eskilstuna United DFF	8
8	(Denmark) Sanne Troelsgaard	FC Rosengård	8
11	(Norway) Kristine Minde	Linköpings FC	7
11	(Netherlands) Lieke Martens (Note: Lieke Martens left Damallsvenskan midseason.)	FC Rosengård	7
11	(Sweden) Madelen Janogy	Piteå IF	7
14	(Sweden) Amanda Edgren	Kristianstads DFF	6
14	(Sweden) Elin Rubensson	Kopparbergs/Göteborg FC	6
14	(Sweden) Julia Spetsmark	KIF Örebro DFF	6
14	(Sweden) Loreta Kullashi	Eskilstuna United DFF	6

=== Goal of the week ===
Rank	Player	Club	Score	Result	Opponent
1	Not awarded				
2	Ebba Hed	Vittsjö GIK	1–0	1–1	Eskilstuna United DFF
3	Tabitha Chawinga	Kvarnsvedens IK	2–3	3–3	Kopparbergs/Göteborg FC
4	Emma Jansson	KIF Örebro DFF	1–0	1–2	Eskilstuna United DFF
5	Tabitha Chawinga	Kvarnsvedens IK	1–1	2–3	Vittsjö GIK
6	Cecilia Pedersen	IF Limhamn Bunkeflo	1–0	2–1	Djurgårdens IF
7	Hanna Sandström	Kristianstads DFF	1–0	1–0	Piteå IF
8	Filippa Angeldal	Hammarby IF	1–3	3–3	Kopparbergs/Göteborg FC
9	Lieke Martens	FC Rosengård	1–0	3–0	Vittsjö GIK
10	Marija Banušić	Linköpings FC	1–0	2–0	Vittsjö GIK
11	Hanna Terry	KIF Örebro DFF	2–1	2–1	Djurgårdens IF
12	Marija Banušić	Linköpings FC	2–0	5–0	KIF Örebro DFF
13	Josefin Johansson	Piteå IF	1–0	3–2	Linköpings FC
14	Kristine Minde	Linköpings FC	1–0	2–0	Kopparbergs/Göteborg FC
15	Marija Banušić	Linköpings FC	2–0	2–2	FC Rosengård
16	Elin Bragnum	Piteå IF	1–0	2–0	Hammarby IF
17	Tine Schryvers	Kristianstads DFF	2–1	2–1	FC Rosengård
18	Olivia Schough	Eskilstuna United DFF	2–1	2–1	Kristianstads DFF
19	Olga Ekblom	Hammarby IF	6–1	6–1	KIF Örebro DFF
