= Emma Kullberg =

Swedish footballer (born 1991)

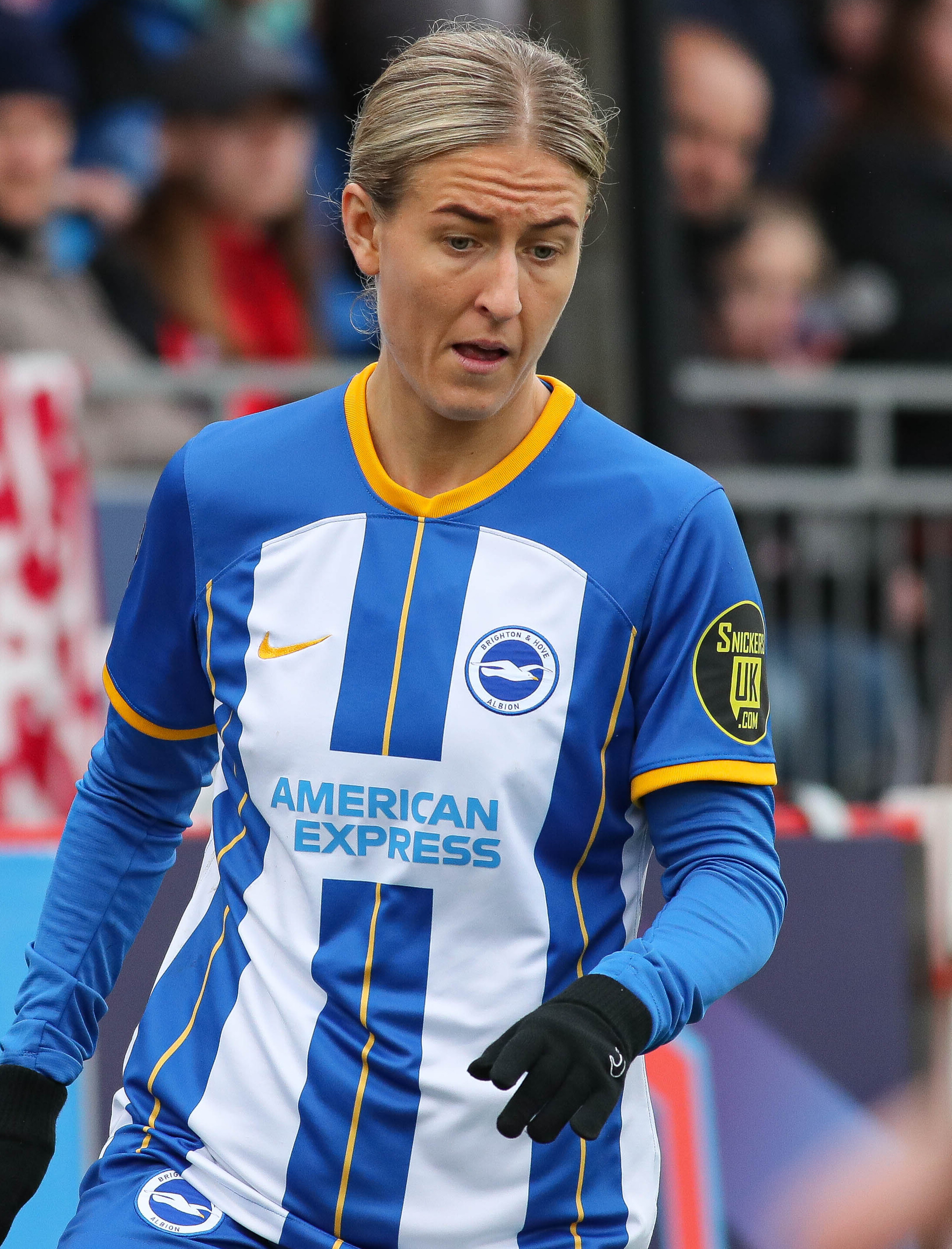
- Kullberg with Brighton & Hove Albion in 2023

Personal information
- Full name: Emma Nanny Charlotte Kullberg
- Date of birth: 25 September 1991 (age 35)
- Place of birth: Umeå, Sweden
- Height: 1.70 m (5 ft 7 in)
- Position: Defender

Team information
- Current team: Inter Milan
- Number: 2

Youth career
- Umeå IK

Senior career*
| Years | Team | Apps | (Gls) |
| 2009–2010 | Umeå IK | 9 | (0) |
| 2010 | Mariehem SK | 5 | (2) |
| 2011 | Östers IF | 21 | (0) |
| 2012 | Vittsjö GIK | 7 | (0) |
| 2013–2015 | Umeå Södra FF | 44 | (2) |
| 2016 | Team TG FF | 12 | (3) |
| 2017 | Umeå IK | 25 | (4) |
| 2018 | Kungsbacka DFF | 23 | (2) |
| 2019 | KIF Örebro DFF | 25 | (0) |
| 2020 | Kopparbergs/Göteborg FC | 22 | (1) |
| 2021 | BK Häcken | 20 | (1) |
| 2022–2024 | Brighton & Hove Albion | 53 | (0) |
| 2024–2026 | Juventus | 27 | (0) |
| 2026– | Inter Milan | 0 | (0) |

International career^{‡}
| 2019– | Sweden | 14 | (0) |
Medal record
Olympic Games
| Silver medal – second place | 2020 Tokyo | Team |
- * Club domestic league appearances and goals as of 1 October 2026 (UTC) ‡ National team caps and goals as of 1 October 2026

Emma Nanny Charlotte Kullberg (born 25 September 1991) is a Swedish professional footballer who plays as a defender for Inter Milan of the Italian Serie A. She previously played for the Damallsvenskan team BK Häcken. Kullberg made her debut for the Sweden women's national football team in November 2019 and won a silver medal with the team at the 2020 Summer Olympics.

== Club career ==
Kullberg transferred to Kopparbergs/Göteborg FC in October 2019, after a successful 2019 season with KIF Örebro DFF in which she played in all 22 Damallsvenskan matches and broke into the national team.

Kulberg won the 2020 Damallsvenskan title with Kopparbergs/Göteborg and with the club retitled as BK Häcken, lifted the 2020-21 Swedish Cup with them.

In January 2022 she joined FA Women's Super League club Brighton & Hove Albion. She signed an 18-month contract in a double transfer with teammate Julia Zigiotti Olme. On 9 August 2023, after 30 appearances with Brighton, she signed a new contract with the club.

On 11 February 2024, as a substitute, Kullberg scored her debut goals for Brighton, a hat trick against Wolverhampton Wanders in the FA Cup for a 4–1 victory, with the winning goals.

On 5 June 2024, Brighton reported that Kullberg, alongside three other players, would leave when their contracts expire in June.

On 31 July 2024, Kullberg signed a one-year contract with Juventus.

== International career ==
On 7 November 2019 Kullberg made her senior Sweden debut, in a 3–2 friendly defeat by the United States in Columbus, Ohio.

Kullberg was selected in Sweden's 2020 Summer Olympics squad, appearing as a late substitute in the final as Sweden lost to Canada on penalties.

== Personal life ==
Emma Kullberg is the daughter of Swedish footballer Stephan Kullberg and sister to footballer Sanna Kullberg. Kullberg lives together with Swedish footballer Julia Zigiotti Olme.

== Career statistics ==
=== Club ===
As of match played 8 February 2026

Appearances and goals by club, season and competition
| Club | Season | League | | | Cups | | Continental | | Total | |
| Club | Season | Division | Apps | Goals | Apps | Goals | Apps | Goals | Apps | Goals |
|---|---|---|---|---|---|---|---|---|---|---|
| Umeå IK | 2009 | Damallsvenskan | 1 | 0 | 0 | 0 | 3 | 0 | 4 | 0 |
| Mariehem SK | 2010 | Damallsvenskan | 5 | 2 | 0 | 0 | 0 | 0 | 5 | 2 |
| Östers IF | 2011 | Damallsvenskan | 21 | 0 | 0 | 0 | 0 | 0 | 21 | 0 |
| Vittsjö GIK | 2012 | Damallsvenskan | 7 | 0 | 1 | 0 | 0 | 0 | 8 | 0 |
| Umeå Södra FF | 2013 | Damallsvenskan | 44 | 2 | 0 | 0 | 0 | 0 | 44 | 2 |
| Umeå Södra FF | 2014 | Damallsvenskan | 44 | 2 | 0 | 0 | 0 | 0 | 44 | 2 |
| Umeå Södra FF | 2015 | Damallsvenskan | 44 | 2 | 0 | 0 | 0 | 0 | 44 | 2 |
| Umeå Södra FF | Total | | 44 | 2 | 0 | 0 | 0 | 0 | 44 | 2 |
| Team TG FF | 2016 | Damallsvenskan | 12 | 3 | 0 | 0 | 0 | 0 | 12 | 3 |
| Umeå IK | 2017 | Damallsvenskan | 25 | 4 | 0 | 0 | 0 | 0 | 25 | 4 |
| Kungsbacka DFF | 2018 | Damallsvenskan | 23 | 2 | 0 | 0 | 0 | 0 | 23 | 2 |
| Kopparbergs/Göteborg FC | 2020 | Damallsvenskan | 22 | 0 | 1 | 0 | 2 | 0 | 24 | 0 |
| BK Häcken FF | 2021 | Damallsvenskan | 20 | 1 | 4 | 0 | 5 | 0 | 29 | 1 |
| Brighton & Hove Albion | 2021–22 | WSL | 13 | 0 | 1 | 0 | 0 | 0 | 14 | 0 |
| Brighton & Hove Albion | 2022–23 | WSL | 19 | 0 | 4 | 0 | 0 | 0 | 23 | 0 |
| Brighton & Hove Albion | 2023–24 | WSL | 21 | 0 | 7 | 3 | 0 | 0 | 28 | 3 |
| Brighton & Hove Albion | Total | | 53 | 0 | 12 | 3 | 0 | 0 | 65 | 3 |
| Juventus | 2024–25 | Serie A | 19 | 0 | 5 | 2 | 7 | 1 | 31 | 3 |
| Juventus | 2025–26 | Serie A | 8 | 0 | 7 | 0 | 6 | 0 | 17 | 0 |
| Juventus | Total | | 27 | 0 | 12 | 2 | 12 | 1 | 48 | 3 |
| Career total | | | 260 | 14 | 30 | 5 | 22 | 1 | 309 | 20 |

=== International ===
As of match played 25 February 2025

Appearances and goals by national team and year
| National team | Year | Apps | Goals |
|---|---|---|---|
| Sweden | 2019 | 1 | 0 |
| Sweden | 2020 | 1 | 0 |
| Sweden | 2021 | 7 | 0 |
| Sweden | 2022 | 3 | 0 |
| Sweden | 2023 | 0 | 0 |
| Sweden | 2024 | 2 | 0 |
| Sweden | 2025 | 2 | 0 |
| Total | | 16 | 0 |

== Honours ==
Kopparbergs/Göteborg

- Damallsvenskan: 2020

BK Häcken

- Svenska Cupen: 2020–21

Juventus

- Serie A: 2024–25
- Coppa Italia: 2024–25
- Serie A Women's Cup: 2025

Sweden

- Summer Olympics runner-up: 2020
- Algarve Cup: 2018
