= Lina Hurtig =

Swedish footballer (born 1995)

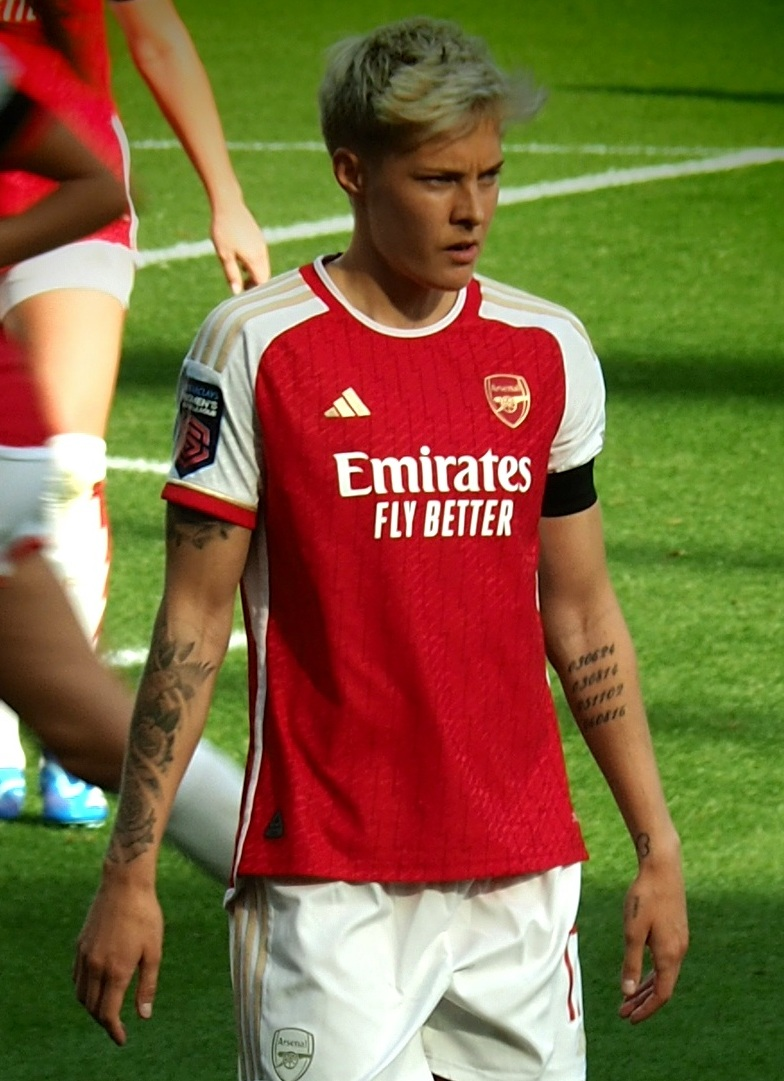
- Hurtig playing for Arsenal in 2023

Personal information
- Full name: Lina Mona Andréa Hurtig
- Date of birth: 5 September 1995 (age 31)
- Place of birth: Avesta, Sweden
- Height: 1.80 m (5 ft 11 in)
- Position: Forward

Team information
- Current team: Fiorentina
- Number: 8

Youth career
- Avesta AIK

Senior career*
Years	Team	Apps	(Gls)
2011	Gustafs GoIF	20	(14)
2012–2016	Umeå IK	88	(24)
2017–2020	Linköping	54	(17)
2020–2022	Juventus	34	(11)
2022–2025	Arsenal	16	(2)
2025–	Fiorentina	10	(0)

International career^{‡}
2011–2012	Sweden U17	6	(2)
2012–2014	Sweden U19	23	(7)
2014–	Sweden	76	(24)
Medal record
Women's football
Representing Sweden
Olympic Games
Silver medal – second place	2020 Tokyo	Team
FIFA Women's World Cup
Bronze medal – third place	2019 France
Bronze medal – third place	2023 Australia-New Zealand
- * Club domestic league appearances and goals as of 05:55, 24 October 2026 (UTC) ‡ National team caps and goals as of 21:30, 13 July 2025 (UTC)

Lina Mona Andréa Hurtig (Swedish: [ˈlîːna ˈmôːna anˈdrêːa ˈhɵ̌ʈːɪɡ]; born 5 September 1995) is a Swedish professional footballer who plays as a forward for Italian Serie A club Fiorentina and the Sweden national team.

== Club career ==
When she was 15 years old, Hurtig played the 2011 season with Gustafs GoIF in the Norrettan, which at the time was the second division of Swedish football. She scored 14 goals and made four assists in 20 games. At the end of that campaign she was approached by Damallsvenskan clubs LdB FC Malmö and Umeå IK. She joined the latter after a short training spell.

Upon Umeå's relegation following the 2016 season, Hurtig transferred to league champions Linköping FC on a two-year contract. In 2017, she and her team won the 2017 Damallsvenskan league title.

On 31 August 2020, Hurtig joined Juventus. She won back to back league titles with Juventus in the 2020–21 and 2021–22 seasons. In the 2021–22 Champions League, Hurtig scored the first goal in a 4–0 victory against Servette FC, helping send Juventus to the Champions League quarter-finals for the first time.

On 18 August 2022, Hurtig joined Arsenal on a permanent transfer, for a fee later reported by Juventus as €73k. She scored her first goals for Arsenal on 27 October 2022 with a brace against FC Zurich at the Emirates Stadium. In the new year she scored immediately after coming off the bench in the FA Cup match vs Leeds United at Meadow Park. Following an injury-affected end of her first season, she scored in the first game of the 23/24 season on 6 September 2023 in the 3–0 victory against her former club Linköping in the 2023–24 Champions League first qualifying round. On 12 November 2023 she scored the final goal in a 6-2 win over Leicester City at the King Power Stadium. She missed most of the rest of the season due to personal issues. She continued to struggle for minutes in the 24/25 season but scored a crucial last minute winner against her former club, Juventus in a result that ultimately helped Arsenal win the group. In her final game as an Arsenal player, she came on at the end of the 2025 Women's Champions League final to help see out the win in Lisbon. She left Arsenal upon the expiry of her contract at the end of the 2024–25 season, having scored 7 goals in 36 appearances for the club.

On 17 June 2025, Hurtig was announced at Fiorentina on a three year contract.

== International career ==
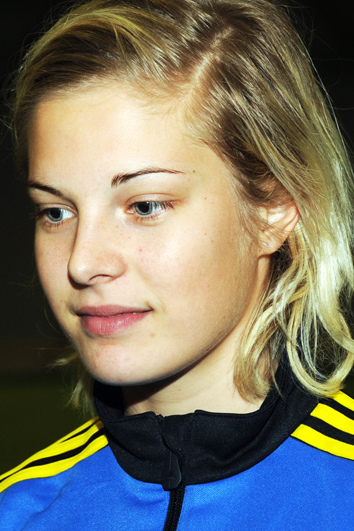
Hurtig with Sweden in 2013

As a Swedish under-19 international, Hurtig was a regular starter at the 2012 U-19 European Championship. She started the victorious Swedish team's 1–0 extra time win over Spain in the final.

In December 2012, national team coach Pia Sundhage called up 17-year-old Hurtig to a senior squad training camp at Bosön. Hurtig was also named in the senior squad for a 1–1 friendly draw with Brazil on 19 June 2013. She was hopeful of making the hosts' final squad for UEFA Euro 2013, but was not selected.

After leaving Hurtig out of the final pre-tournament friendly against Norway in May 2013, Sundhage described her as a potentially world class player.

Hurtig won her first senior cap as a substitute in a 1–1 draw with Canada in November 2014.

Hurtig was selected in the Sweden squad that travelled to France for the 2019 World Cup. She scored her first goal in the tournament in a 5–1 win against Thailand. In July 2021, she was selected in the Sweden squad for the 2020 Summer Olympics. On 21 July, she scored in the 3–0 victory over United States.

On 13 June 2023, she was included in the 23-player squad for the 2023 World Cup. In the Round of 16, she successfully converted on a video-confirmed penalty in the shootout against the United States, knocking the two-time defending champions out of the tournament.

== Personal life ==
On 16 August 2019, Hurtig announced that she had married Lisa Lantz, her teammate at Umeå IK and Linköping FC. On 11 June 2021, Hurtig had a daughter, Lo. In early December 2024, she had a son.

== Career statistics ==
=== Club ===
As of 24 May 2025

Appearances and goals by club, season and competition
Club	Season	League			Domestic Cups		Europe		Total	
Club	Season	Division	Apps	Goals	Apps	Goals	Apps	Goals	Apps	Goals
Umea FC	2012	Unknown	2	2	—		—		2	2
Umea FC	2013	Unknown	6	9	—		—		6	9
Umea FC	2014	Unknown	16	6	—		—		16	6
Umea FC	2015	Unknown	18	4	—		—		18	4
Umea FC	2016	Unknown	17	2	1	2	—		18	4
Umea FC	Total		59	23	1	2	0	0	60	25
Linköping FC	2017	Damallsvenskan	21	5	—		—		21	5
Linköping FC	2018	Damallsvenskan	11	5	—		6	4	17	9
Linköping FC	2019	Damallsvenskan	22	8	1	0	4	1	27	9
Linköping FC	2020	Damallsvenskan	11	2	4	1	2	1	17	4
Linköping FC	Total		65	20	5	1	12	6	82	38
Juventus FC (women)	2020–21	Serie A	15	7	6	1	2	1	23	9
Juventus FC (women)	2021–22	Serie A	19	4	6	2	11	4	36	10
Juventus FC (women)	Total		34	11	12	3	13	5	59	19
Arsenal	2022–23	Women's Super League	9	0	3	1	7	2	19	3
Arsenal	2023–24	Women's Super League	2	1	2	0	2	1	6	2
Arsenal	2024–25	Women's Super League	5	1	0	0	7	1	12	2
Arsenal	Total		16	2	5	1	16	4	37	7
Career total			174	56	23	7	41	15	238	89

=== International ===
As of match played 26 September 2023

Appearances and goals by national team and year
National team	Year	Apps	Goals
Sweden U19	2014	4	7
Sweden	2017	2	1
Sweden	2019	13	3
Sweden	2021	11	5
Sweden	2022	13	5
Sweden	2023	17	6
Total		60	27

As of goal scored on 22 September 2023
Scores and results list Sweden's goal tally first, score column indicates score after each Hurtig goal.

List of international goals scored by Lina Hurtig
No.	Date	Venue	Opponent	Score	Result	Competition	Ref.
1	22 September 2015	Gamla Ullevi, Gothenburg, Sweden	Poland	1–0	3–0	UEFA Euro 2017 qualification	
2	19 September 2017	Stadion Varteks, Varaždin, Croatia	Croatia	1–0	2–0	2019 FIFA World Cup qualification	
3	24 October 2017	Borås Arena, Borås, Sweden	Hungary	1–0	5–0	2019 FIFA World Cup qualification	
4	16 June 2019	Allianz Riviera, Nice, France	Thailand	4–0	5–1	2019 FIFA World Cup	
5	8 October 2019	Gamla Ullevi, Gothenburg, Sweden	Slovakia	2–0	7–0	UEFA Euro 2022 qualification	
6	7 March 2020	Lagos Municipal Stadium, Lagos, Portugal	Denmark	1–0	1–2	2020 Algarve Cup	
7	17 September 2020	Gamla Ullevi, Gothenburg, Sweden	Hungary	1–0	8–0	UEFA Euro 2022 qualification	
8	17 September 2020	Gamla Ullevi, Gothenburg, Sweden	Hungary	5–0	8–0	UEFA Euro 2022 qualification	
9	22 October 2020	Gamla Ullevi, Gothenburg, Sweden	Latvia	1–0	7–0	UEFA Euro 2022 qualification	
10	19 February 2021	Hibernians Stadium, Paola, Malta	Austria	3–1	6–1	Friendly	
11	10 April 2021	Friends Arena, Stockholm, Sweden	United States	1–0	1–1	Friendly	
12	13 April 2021	Widzew Stadium, Łódź, Poland	Poland	4–2		Friendly	
13	21 July 2021	Ajinomoto Stadium, Chofu, Japan	United States	3–0		2020 Summer Olympics	
14	24 July 2021	Saitama Stadium 2002, Saitama, Japan	Australia	2–2	4–2	2020 Summer Olympics	
15	25 November 2021	Gamla Ullevi, Gothenburg, Sweden	Finland	2–1		2023 FIFA World Cup qualification	
16	30 November 2021	Stadion, Malmö, Sweden	Slovakia	1–0	3–0	2023 FIFA World Cup qualification	
17	7 April 2022	Tengiz Burjanadze Stadium, Gori, Georgia	Georgia	9–0	15–0	2023 FIFA World Cup qualification	
18	7 April 2022	Tengiz Burjanadze Stadium, Gori, Georgia	Georgia	11–0	15–0	2023 FIFA World Cup qualification	
19	28 June 2022	Friends Arena, Stockholm, Sweden	Brazil	2–1	3–1	Friendly	
20	6 September 2022	Tampere Stadium, Tampere, Finland	Finland	2–0	5–0	2023 FIFA Women's World Cup qualification	
21	22 September 2023	Gamla Ullevi, Gothenburg, Sweden	Spain	2–2	2–3	2023–24 UEFA Women's Nations League	
22	3 June 2025	Strawberry Arena, Solna, Sweden	Denmark	6–1	6–1	2025 UEFA Women's Nations League A	
23	8 July 2025	Allmend Stadion Luzern, Lucerne, Switzerland	Poland	3–0	3–0	UEFA Women's Euro 2025	
24	12 July 2025	Stadion Letzigrund, Zurich, Switzerland	Germany	4–1	4–1	UEFA Women's Euro 2025	

== Honours ==
Linköpings FC

- Damallsvenskan: 2017

Juventus

- Serie A: 2020–21, 2021–22
- Coppa Italia: 2021–22
- Supercoppa Italiana: 2020–21, 2021–22

Arsenal

- FA League Cup: 2022–23
- UEFA Champions League: 2024–25

Sweden

- UEFA Under-19 Championship: 2012
- Summer Olympics Silver Medal: 2020
- FIFA Women's World Cup Bronze Medal: 2019, 2023
