= 2023–24 Brighton & Hove Albion W.F.C. season =

Brighton & Hove Albion
2023–24 season
- Chairman: Tony Bloom
- Manager: Melissa Phillips (until 1 February); Mikey Harris (interim, from 1 February)
- Stadium: Broadfield Stadium, Crawley
- Women's Super League: 9th
- FA Cup: Quarter-finals
- League Cup: Quarter-finals
- Top goalscorer: League: Elisabeth Terland (13); All: Elisabeth Terland (15)
- Highest home attendance: 6,951 (Falmer Stadium); 4,921 (Broadfield Stadium)
- Lowest home attendance: 1,126
- Average home league attendance: 3,551
- Biggest win: 6–0 vs Luton Town (FA Cup – 14 January 2024)
- Biggest defeat: 0–5 vs Arsenal (WSL – 18 May 2024)
Home colours	Away colours	Third colours
- All statistics correct as of 18 May 2024.

The 2023–24 Brighton & Hove Albion W.F.C. season was the club's 33rd season in existence and their sixth in the Women's Super League, the highest level of the football pyramid. Along with competing in the WSL, the club also contested two domestic cup competitions: the FA Cup and the League Cup.

== Squad ==
As of 27 January 2024

Note: Flags indicate national team as defined under FIFA eligibility rules; some limited exceptions apply. Players may hold more than one non-FIFA nationality.

No.	Pos.	Nation	Player
2	DF	NOR	Maria Thorisdottir
3	DF	ENG	Poppy Pattinson
5	DF	NOR	Guro Bergsvand
6	MF	ESP	Vicky Losada (captain)
7	MF	GRE	Veatriki Sarri
8	FW	GER	Pauline Bremer
9	FW	KOR	Lee Geum-min
10	FW	SWE	Julia Zigiotti Olme
11	FW	NOR	Elisabeth Terland
13	FW	USA	Taylor Smith
14	DF	COL	Jorelyn Carabalí

No.	Pos.	Nation	Player
16	DF	SWE	Emma Kullberg
17	MF	POR	Tatiana Pinto
18	MF	ENG	Maisie Symonds
20	MF	SRB	Dejana Stefanović
21	MF	USA	Madison Haley
22	MF	ENG	Katie Robinson
26	DF	CHN	Li Mengwen
28	GK	GER	Melina Loeck
32	GK	ENG	Sophie Baggaley
33	MF	AUS	Charlize Rule

== Brighton players at the 2023 FIFA Women's World Cup ==
Five Brighton players received international call-ups to play at the 2023 FIFA Women's World Cup.

- Guro Bergsvand – Norway
- Lee Geum-min – South Korea
- Katie Robinson – England
- Rebekah Stott – New Zealand
- Lydia Williams – Australia

== Preseason ==
30 August 2023 Friendly	Sporting de Huelva (Spain)	1–2	Brighton & Hove Albion	Huelva
	Ballesté (pen.)	Report	(o.g.); Bremer	Stadium: Ciudad Deportiva del Recreativo de Huelva

2 September 2023 Friendly	Sevilla (Spain)	0–1	Brighton & Hove Albion	Seville
		Report	Gomes (o.g.)	Stadium: Estadio Jesús Navas

10 September 2023 Friendly	Brighton & Hove Albion	0–0	Tottenham Hotspur	Lancing
		Report		Stadium: American Express Elite Football Performance Centre

== Competitions ==
=== Women's Super League ===
==== Results summary ====
Overall								Home						Away					
Pld	W	D	L	GF	GA	GD	Pts	W	D	L	GF	GA	GD	W	D	L	GF	GA	GD
22	5	4	13	26	48	−22	19	1	2	8	10	25	−15	4	2	5	16	23	−7

Last updated: 18 May 2024.
Source: Women's Super League

==== Results by matchday ====
Round	1	2	3	4	5	6	7	8	9	10	11	12	13	14	15	16	17	18	19	20	21	22
Ground	A	H	H	A	H	A	H	A	H	A	H	H	A	H	A	H	A	A	H	A	H	A
Result	W	L	L	L	D	W	L	L	D	L	W	L	L	L	W	L	W	D	L	D	L	L
Position	3	8	10	9	9	8	8	9	9	9	8	10	11	11	9	10	8	8	8	8	9	9
Points	3	3	3	3	4	7	7	7	8	8	11	11	11	11	14	14	17	18	18	19	19	19

Source: Women's Super League
A = Away; H = Home; W = Win; D = Draw; L = Loss

==== Results ====
1 October 2023 1	Everton	1–2	Brighton & Hove Albion	Liverpool
13:00 BST	Finnigan 65'	Report	Terland 3', 14'; Thorisdottir (yellow card) 35'; Sarri (yellow card) 90+4'	Stadium: Walton Hall Park; Attendance: 1,295; Referee: Kirsty Dowle

8 October 2023 2	Brighton & Hove Albion	0–2	West Ham United	Crawley
12:00 BST	Thorisdottir (yellow card) 24'; Bergsvand (yellow card) 65'	Report	Smith 12'; Ueki (yellow card) 25', (goal) 52'; Asseyi (yellow card) 38'; Evans (yellow card) 75'; Atkinson (yellow card) 89'; Shimizu (yellow card) 90+1'	Stadium: Broadfield Stadium; Attendance: 1,126; Referee: Amy Fearn

15 October 2023 3	Brighton & Hove Albion	1–3	Tottenham Hotspur	Falmer
16:00 BST	Terland 8'; Pinto (yellow card) 81'	Report	Thomas 45+3'; Clinton 65'; Percival 90+4'	Stadium: Falmer Stadium; Attendance: 6,951; Referee: Kirsty Dowle

22 October 2023 4	Chelsea	4–2	Brighton & Hove Albion	Kingston upon Thames
12:30 BST	Nüsken 45+4', 52'; Bergsvand 74' (o.g.); Beever-Jones 82'	Report	Bremer 10'; Terland 90'	Stadium: Kingsmeadow; Attendance: 3,647; Referee: Stacey Fullicks

5 November 2023 5	Brighton & Hove Albion	2–2	Manchester United	Crawley
18:45 GMT	Terland 30'; Bergsvand 89'	Report	Le Tissier (yellow card) 11'; Riviere (yellow card) 57'; Toone 78'; Williams 90+8'	Stadium: Broadfield Stadium; Attendance: 3,444; Referee: Elizabeth Simms

12 November 2023 6	Manchester City	0–1	Brighton & Hove Albion	Manchester
13:00 GMT		Report	Lee 81'	Stadium: Academy Stadium; Attendance: 2,885; Referee: Stacey Pearson

19 November 2023 7	Brighton & Hove Albion	0–3	Arsenal	Crawley
14:00 GMT	Losada (yellow card) 32'; Bergsvand (yellow card) 72'	Report	Blackstenius 12'; Foord 80'; Russo (yellow card) 83'; Maanum 90+5'	Stadium: Broadfield Stadium; Attendance: 4,921; Referee: Tim Robinson

26 November 2023 8	Liverpool	4–0	Brighton & Hove Albion	Birkenhead
14:00 GMT	Bonner 27'; van de Sanden 43'; Holland 63'; Lundgaard (yellow card) 90'; Haug 90+2'	Report	Carabalí (yellow card) 10'	Stadium: Prenton Park; Attendance: 1,344; Referee: Adewunmi Soneye

10 December 2023 9	Brighton & Hove Albion	2–2	Leicester City	Crawley
14:00 GMT	Losada (yellow card) 65'; Terland (yellow card) 71', (goal) 82', 88'	Report	Green (yellow card) 17'; Petermann 45'; Rantala 46'	Stadium: Broadfield Stadium; Attendance: 1,954; Referee: Melissa Burgin

17 December 2023 10	Aston Villa	1–0	Brighton & Hove Albion	Walsall
18:45 GMT	Leon 63', (yellow card) 87'; Pacheco (yellow card) 80' (yellow-red card) 90'	Report	Losada (yellow card) 36'; Symonds (yellow card) 40'	Stadium: Bescot Stadium; Attendance: 1,784; Referee: Emily Heaslip

21 January 2024 11	Brighton & Hove Albion	3–2	Bristol City	Crawley
14:00 GMT	Terland 31', 90+5'; Robinson 57'	Report	Rodgers (yellow card) 52'; Harrison 55'; Jones 83'	Stadium: Broadfield Stadium; Attendance: 2,049; Referee: Lisa Benn

27 January 2024 12	Brighton & Hove Albion	0–3	Chelsea	Crawley
17:30 GMT		Report	James 46', 59'; Kirby 51'	Stadium: Broadfield Stadium; Attendance: 4,549; Referee: Amy Fearn

4 February 2024 13	Manchester United	2–0	Brighton & Hove Albion	Leigh
12:00 GMT	Parris 9', 64'	Report	Terland (yellow card) 55'; Lee (yellow card) 58'	Stadium: Leigh Sports Village; Attendance: 4,060; Referee: Megan Wilson

18 February 2024 14	Brighton & Hove Albion	0–1	Liverpool	Crawley
12:00 GMT		Report	Holland 53', (yellow card) 68' (yellow-red card) 90+3'; Fisk (yellow card) 57'; Fahey (yellow card) 57'	Stadium: Broadfield Stadium; Attendance: 2,959; Referee: Amy Fearn/Emily Heaslip

3 March 2024 15	Bristol City	3–7	Brighton & Hove Albion	Bristol
14:00 GMT	Powell (yellow card) 22'; Megan Connolly 47'; Aspin 71'; Thestrup 74'	Report	Terland 20', 54'; Bremer 24'; Pinto 64'; Haley 89'; Losada 90+2' (pen.); Robinson 90+6'	Stadium: Ashton Gate; Attendance: 3,648; Referee: Adewunmi Soneye

17 March 2024 16	Brighton & Hove Albion	1–4	Manchester City	Crawley
12:00 GMT	Carabalí (yellow card) 65'; McEwen (yellow card) 85'; Lee 90+1'; Symonds (yellow card) 90+3'	Report	Hemp 27'; Fowler 40'; Shaw 69'; Coombs 78'	Stadium: Broadfield Stadium; Attendance: 3,490; Referee: Megan Wilson

24 March 2024 17	Leicester City	2–3	Brighton & Hove Albion	Leicester
15:00 GMT	Rantala 54'; Petermann 84'	Report	Terland (yellow card) 31', (goal) 85'; Haley 62'; Losada (yellow card) 64'; Robinson 68'; Lee (yellow card) 72'; Olme (yellow card) 77'	Stadium: King Power Stadium; Attendance: 2,714; Referee: Cheryl Foster

31 March 2024 18	West Ham United	0–0	Brighton & Hove Albion	Dagenham
15:00 BST	Ueki (yellow card) 69'	Report	Losada (yellow card) 31'; Olme (yellow card) 34'; Haley (yellow card) 64'; Symonds (yellow card) 89'	Stadium: Victoria Road; Attendance: 1,769; Referee: Kirsty Dowle

19 April 2024 19	Brighton & Hove Albion	1–2	Everton	Falmer
19:00 BST	Pinto (yellow card) 59', (goal) 63'	Report	Stenevik (yellow card) 49'; Holmgaard 60'; Bergsvand 72' (o.g.); Finnigan (yellow card) 75'	Stadium: Falmer Stadium; Attendance: 4,967; Referee: Kirsty Dowle

28 April 2024 20	Tottenham Hotspur	1–1	Brighton & Hove Albion	Leyton
14:00 BST	England 81'; Clinton (yellow card) 90+7'	Report	Terland 17'; Lee (yellow card) 48'; Haley (yellow card) 65'; Pinto (yellow card) 69'	Stadium: Brisbane Road; Attendance: 1,290; Referee: Melissa Burgin

4 May 2024 21	Brighton & Hove Albion	0–1	Aston Villa	Crawley
13:00 BST	Thorisdottir (yellow card) 18'	Report	Hanson (yellow card) 45+2'; Maritz (yellow card) 60'; Lehmann 64'	Stadium: Broadfield Stadium; Attendance: 2,651; Referee: Elizabeth Simms

18 May 2024 22	Arsenal	5–0	Brighton & Hove Albion	Borehamwood
15:00 BST	Russo 17', 24'; Miedema 64'; Carabalí 67' (o.g.); Maanum 88'	Report	Losada (yellow card) 43'	Stadium: Meadow Park; Attendance: 3,553; Referee: Lauren Impey

==== League table ====
Pos	Team	Pld	W	D	L	GF	GA	GD	Pts
7	Aston Villa	22	7	3	12	27	43	−16	24
8	Everton	22	6	5	11	24	37	−13	23
9	Brighton & Hove Albion	22	5	4	13	26	48	−22	19
10	Leicester City	22	4	6	12	26	45	−19	18
11	West Ham United	22	3	6	13	20	45	−25	15

Source: Women's Super League Table
Rules for classification: 1) Points; 2) Goal difference; 3) Number of goals scored.

=== FA Cup ===
As a member of the Women's Super League Brighton & Hove Albion enter the FA Cup in the fourth round.

14 January 2024 Fourth round	Luton Town	0–6	Brighton & Hove Albion	Barton-le-Clay
13:00 GMT		Report	Sarri 34'; Losada 39'; Pinto 48', 72'; Terland 55'; Bremer 88'	Stadium: Sharpenhoe Road; Attendance: 1,235; Referee: Ruby Sykes

11 February 2024 Fifth round	Wolverhampton Wanderers	1–4	Brighton & Hove Albion	Telford
13:00 GMT	Toussaint (yellow card) 36'; Merrick 67' (pen.)	Report	Robinson 42'; Losada (yellow card) 45'; Kullberg 88', 90+2', 90+6'	Stadium: New Bucks Head; Attendance: 1,812; Referee: Phoebe Cross

9 March 2024 Quarter-finals	Brighton & Hove Albion	0–4	Manchester United	Crawley
17:15 GMT	Olme (yellow card) 58'	Report	Turner 8'; Parris 17'; García 45+1'; Naalsund 59'	Stadium: Broadfield Stadium; Attendance: 3,701; Referee: Lisa Benn

=== League Cup ===
==== Group stage ====
11 October 2023 Group stage	Birmingham City	0–3	Brighton & Hove Albion	Birmingham
19:00 BST		Report	Rule 16', (yellow card) 80'; Symonds (yellow card) 45'; Robinson 49'; Losada (yellow card) 61'; Terland 86'	Stadium: St Andrew's; Attendance: 588; Referee: Phoebe Cross

22 November 2023 Group stage	Brighton & Hove Albion	3–1	West Ham United	Crawley
19:00 GMT	Thorisdottir (yellow card) 28'; Bergsvand 45+1'; Losada 52' (pen.); Sarri 61' (pen.); Pattinson (yellow card) 64'	Report	Stapleton (yellow card) 23'; Asseyi (yellow card) 28'; Stringer (yellow card) 44'; Cooke (yellow card) 51'; Cissoko 89'	Stadium: Broadfield Stadium; Attendance: 845; Referee: Amy Fearn

24 January 2024 Group stage	Charlton Athletic	1–2	Brighton & Hove Albion	Crayford
19:00 GMT	Green 90+2'	Report	Carabalí 22'; Pinto 37'	Stadium: The Oakwood; Attendance: 365; Referee: Grace Lowe

Pos	Team	Pld	W	PW	PL	L	GF	GA	GD	Pts	Qualification	BHA	CHA	WHU	BIR
1	Brighton & Hove Albion (Q)	3	3	0	0	0	8	2	+6	9	Advanced to knock-out stage	—	–	3–1	–
2	Charlton Athletic	3	1	0	0	2	3	4	−1	3	Possible knock-out stage based on ranking	1–2	—	–	1–0
3	West Ham United	3	1	0	0	2	4	6	−2	3		–	2–1	—	–
4	Birmingham City	3	1	0	0	2	2	5	−3	3		0–3	–	2–1	—

Source: FA Women's League Cup
Rules for classification: 1) Points; 2) Goal difference; 3) Number of goals scored; 4) Number of wins; 5) Head-to-head record
(Q) Qualified to the phase indicated

==== Knock-out Stage ====
7 February 2024 Quarter-final	Brighton & Hove Albion	1–1 (a.e.t.) (0–2 p)	Aston Villa	Crawley
19:00 GMT	Sarri 35'	Report	Magill (yellow card) 46'; Hanson 69'; Pacheco (yellow card) 86'	Stadium: Broadfield Stadium; Attendance: 1,050; Referee: Lauren Impey
	Penalties
	(penalty missed) Losada; (penalty missed) Lee; (penalty missed) Terland; (penalty missed) Olme		(penalty missed) Mayling; (penalty scored) Leon; (penalty missed) Corsie; (penalty scored) Patten

== Squad statistics ==
=== Appearances ===
As of 18 May 2024

Starting appearances are listed first, followed by substitute appearances after the + symbol where applicable.

No.	Pos	Nat	Player	Total		WSL		FA Cup		League Cup	
No.	Pos	Nat	Player	Apps	Goals	Apps	Goals	Apps	Goals	Apps	Goals
Goalkeepers
28	GK	(Germany) GER	Melina Loeck	2	0	2	0	0	0	0	0
32	GK	(England) ENG	Sophie Baggaley	23	0	19	0	3	0	1	0
Defenders
2	DF	(Norway) NOR	Maria Thorisdottir	26	0	19+1	0	2	0	3+1	0
3	DF	(England) ENG	Poppy Pattinson	20	0	14+1	0	2	0	3	0
5	DF	(Norway) NOR	Guro Bergsvand	29	2	22	1	3	0	3+1	1
13	DF	(United States) USA	Taylor Smith	0	0	0	0	0	0	0	0
14	DF	(Colombia) COL	Jorelyn Carabalí	18	1	12+1	0	1+1	0	2+1	1
16	DF	(Sweden) SWE	Emma Kullberg	28	3	14+7	0	2+1	3	2+2	0
26	DF	(China) CHN	Li Mengwen	15	0	6+5	0	1+1	0	2	0
44	DF	(England) ENG	Grace McEwen	4	0	0+1	0	0+1	0	0+2	0
52	DF	(England) ENG	Jessica Pegram	0	0	0	0	0	0	0	0
Midfielders
6	MF	(Spain) ESP	Vicky Losada	28	3	20+1	1	2+1	1	3+1	1
7	MF	(Greece) GRE	Veatriki Sarri	26	3	11+8	0	2+1	1	4	2
17	MF	(Portugal) POR	Tatiana Pinto	27	5	9+11	2	2+1	2	4	1
18	MF	(England) ENG	Maisie Symonds	26	0	10+10	0	1+1	0	3+1	0
20	MF	(Serbia) SRB	Dejana Stefanović	2	0	0+2	0	0	0	0	0
21	MF	(United States) USA	Madison Haley	16	2	6+7	2	0+1	0	1+1	0
22	MF	(England) ENG	Katie Robinson	30	5	19+4	3	3	1	2+2	1
33	MF	(Australia) AUS	Charlize Rule	11	1	4+5	0	0	0	2	1
39	MF	(England) ENG	Olivia Johnson	1	0	0+1	0	0	0	0	0
Forwards
8	FW	(Germany) GER	Pauline Bremer	20	3	14+2	2	2	1	1+1	0
9	FW	(South Korea) KOR	Lee Geum-min	26	2	8+12	2	2+1	0	2+1	0
10	FW	(Sweden) SWE	Julia Zigiotti Olme	26	0	19+1	0	3	0	1+2	0
11	FW	(Norway) NOR	Elisabeth Terland	28	15	21+1	13	2+1	1	1+2	1
34	FW	(England) ENG	Clarabella Hall	1	0	0	0	0+1	0	0	0
45	FW	(England) ENG	Lily Dent	4	0	0+3	0	0+1	0	0	0
Squad players who left the club permanently or on loan during the season
1	GK	(Belgium) BEL	Nicky Evrard	3	0	1	0	0	0	2	0
15	MF	(Australia) AUS	Mackenzie Hawkesby	1	0	0	0	0	0	1	0
40	GK	(England) ENG	Katie Startup	1	0	0	0	0	0	1	0

Note

• Mackenzie Hawkesby rejoined Australian A-League Women club Sydney FC on 29 December 2023.

• Katie Startup joined Manchester City on 14 April on loan until the end of the season.

=== Goalscorers ===
As of 18 May 2024

Rnk	No	Pos	Nat	Name	WSL	FA Cup	League Cup	Total
1	11	FW	(Norway)	Elisabeth Terland	13	1	1	15
2	17	MF	(Portugal)	Tatiana Pinto	2	2	1	5
2	22	MF	(England)	Katie Robinson	3	1	1	5
3	8	FW	(Germany)	Pauline Bremer	2	1	0	3
3	16	DF	(Sweden)	Emma Kullberg	0	3	0	3
3	6	MF	(Spain)	Vicky Losada	1	1	1	3
3	7	MF	(Greece)	Veatriki Sarri	0	1	2	3
4	5	DF	(Norway)	Guro Bergsvand	1	0	1	2
4	21	MF	(United States)	Madison Haley	2	0	0	2
4	9	FW	(South Korea)	Lee Geum-min	2	0	0	2
5	14	DF	(Colombia)	Jorelyn Carabalí	0	0	1	1
5	33	MF	(Australia)	Charlize Rule	0	0	1	1
Own goals					0	0	0	0
Total					26	10	9	45

== Transfers ==
=== In ===
Date	Position	Nationality	Name	From	Ref.
19 June 2023	FW	(Germany)	Pauline Bremer	(Germany) VfL Wolfsburg	
16 July 2023	MF	(Spain)	Vicky Losada	(Italy) AS Roma	
17 July 2023	MF	(United States)	Madison Haley	(Australia) Sydney FC	
21 July 2023	MF	(Australia)	Mackenzie Hawkesby	(Australia) Sydney FC	
26 July 2023	DF	(Australia)	Charlize Rule	(Australia) Sydney FC	
30 August 2023	DF	(Norway)	Maria Thorisdottir	(England) Manchester United	
1 September 2023	DF	(China)	Li Mengwen	(China) Jiangsu	
6 September 2023	MF	(Portugal)	Tatiana Pinto	(Spain) Levante	
13 September 2023	MF	(Colombia)	Jorelyn Carabalí	(Brazil) Atlético Mineiro	
14 September 2023	GK	(England)	Sophie Baggaley	(England) Manchester United	
22 January 2024	GK	(Germany)	Melina Loeck	(Sweden) Kristianstads DFF	

=== Loans in ===
Date	Position	Nationality	Name	From	Until	Ref.
14 September 2023	GK	(Belgium)	Nicky Evrard	(England) Chelsea	9 January 2024 (Note: Evrard returned to Chelsea on 9 January to continue her recovery from a long-term hamstring injury.)	
31 January 2024	FW	(United States)	Taylor Smith	(United States) Gotham FC	8 March 2024 (Note: Smith was recalled by Gotham FC on 8 March.)	

=== Out ===
Date	Position	Nationality	Name	To	Ref.
30 June 2023	FW	(England)	Danielle Carter	(England) London City Lionesses	
30 June 2023	MF	(Republic of Ireland)	Megan Connolly	(England) Bristol City	
30 June 2023	MF	(Wales)	Kayleigh Green	(England) Charlton Athletic	
30 June 2023	GK	(Republic of Ireland)	Megan Walsh	(England) West Ham United	
30 June 2023	DF	(Jamaica)	Victoria Williams	Unattached	
10 August 2023	DF	(New Zealand)	Rebekah Stott	(Australia) Melbourne City	
31 August 2023	MF	(United States)	Brianna Visalli	(Denmark) Aarhus GF	
14 September 2023	DF	(United States)	Zoe Morse	Retired	
14 September 2023	MF	(South Korea)	Park Ye-eun	(Scotland) Heart of Midlothian	
16 September 2023	GK	(Australia)	Lydia Williams	(Australia) Melbourne Victory	
29 December 2023	MF	(Australia)	Mackenzie Hawkesby	(Australia) Sydney FC	

=== Loans out ===
Date	Position	Nationality	Name	To	Until	Ref.
8 September 2023	FW	(England)	Chelsea Ferguson	(England) Blackburn Rovers	8 January 2024 (Note: On 8 January, Ferguson was recalled from her loan at Blackburn Rovers.)	
14 September 2023	MF	(England)	Lulu Jarvis	(England) Reading	End of Season	
14 September 2023	MF	(England)	Libby Bance	(Scotland) Rangers	End of Season	
31 January 2024	FW	(England)	Chelsea Ferguson	(England) Lewes	End of Season	
1 February 2024	GK	(England)	Comfort Erhabor	(Scotland) Hibernian	End of Season	
14 April 2024	GK	(England)	Katie Startup	(England) Manchester City	End of Season	
