= Julia Zigiotti Olme =

Swedish footballer (born 1997)

- Zigiotti with Manchester United in 2025

Personal information
- Full name: Julia Margareta Zigiotti Olme
- Date of birth: 24 December 1997 (age 28)
- Place of birth: Upplands Väsby, Sweden
- Height: 1.60 m (5 ft 3 in)
- Position: Defensive midfielder

Team information
- Current team: Manchester United
- Number: 15

Youth career
- Bollstanäs SK

Senior career*
Years	Team	Apps	(Gls)
2012–2014	Bollstanäs SK	44	(17)
2015	AIK	21	(4)
2016–2018	Hammarby	58	(22)
2018–2021	BK Häcken	71	(16)
2022–2024	Brighton & Hove Albion	51	(4)
2024–2025	Bayern Munich	16	(0)
2025–	Manchester United	31	(6)

International career^{‡}
2014	Sweden U17	6	(2)
2014–2016	Sweden U19	18	(3)
2018–	Sweden	60	(2)
Medal record
Women's soccer
Representing Sweden
FIFA Women's World Cup
Bronze medal – third place	2019 France	Team
- * Club domestic league appearances and goals as of 19:05, 22 November 2026 (UTC) ‡ National team caps and goals as of 09:09, 14 October 2026 (UTC)

Julia Margareta Zigiotti Olme (born 24 December 1997) is a Swedish professional footballer who plays as a defensive midfielder for Women's Super League club Manchester United and the Sweden national team.

== Club career ==
=== Early career ===
Zigiotti joined the youth ranks of Bollstanäs SK in her home locality of Upplands Väsby, making her senior debut in her mid-teens. Between 2014 and 2018, she played with AIK and Hammarby in Sweden's Damallsvenskan.

=== BK Häcken ===
Zigiotti joined Kopparbergs/Göteborg FC from Hammarby in 2018. In November 2020, Zigiotti Olme won the Damallsvenskan with Kopparbergs/Göteborg FC, the club's first league title. Just days after the win, the club announced its plans to cease operations. This decision was shortly reversed, but the club became part of BK Häcken, operating under the name Bollklubben Häcken Fotbollsförening (BK Häcken FF). Zigiotti Olme underwent surgery on both hips in December 2020, and was sidelined for six months.

In October 2021, Zigiotti was on the bench as Häcken missed out on a chance to win their second Damallsvenskan title; her agent alleged that she was excluded from the match because she had not signed a new contract with the club.

=== Brighton & Hove Albion ===
In January 2022, Zigiotti joined Women's Super League club Brighton & Hove Albion on an 18-month contract in a double transfer with international teammate (and partner) Emma Kullberg.

She was named Player's Player of the Season for her performance in the 2022–23 campaign. She captained the club during the latter part of the season before losing the armband under new head coach Melissa Phillips. On 9 August 2023, she signed a new contract with Brighton.

On 24 July 2024, it was announced that Zigiotti had left the club after the expiry of her contract. She had rejected a contract extension from Brighton.

=== Bayern Munich ===
On 30 July 2024, Zigiotti signed a two-year contract with Frauen-Bundesliga side Bayern Munich. With Bayern, she won the domestic treble: the Frauen-Bundesliga, the DFB-Pokal, and the DFB-Supercup.

=== Manchester United ===
On 31 July 2025, Zigiotti signed for Manchester United in the WSL on a two-year contract with the option for a further year. She made her club debut on 10 September, with head coach Marc Skinner describing her as "exceptional". On 7 February 2026, she scored her first goal for the club in a 0–2 win over Leicester City; she also assisted Elisabeth Terland's second-half goal.

== International career ==
Zigiotti Olme was first called up to the senior Sweden national team in September 2018.

In May 2019, she was called up to the Swedish team for the 2019 Women's World Cup. Sweden beat England to claim third-place at the tournament. She was not called up to team for the 2020 Summer Olympics, 2022 Women's Euro or the 2023 Women's World Cup.

Zigiotti represented Sweden at the 2025 Women's Euro tournament in Switzerland, where Sweden were eliminated in the quarter-finals through a 2–3 penalty shootout loss to eventual champions England. Only Zigiotti Olme and Nathalie Björn scored their penalties for Sweden, with Player of the Match Hannah Hampton making two saves and five Swedish players recording misses.

== Personal life ==
Zigiotti born to a Italian mother and a Swedish father. She has always intended to play for Sweden internationally, and plays with her mother's surname to honour her Italian side. She was a childhood Juventus supporter, and idolised Alessandro Del Piero.

Zigiotti was in a relationship with her Häcken and Brighton teammate and fellow Swedish footballer Emma Kullberg. The pair became engaged in 2022, but appeared to have split by 2025.

== Career statistics ==
=== Club ===
As of match played 22 November 2026.

Appearances and goals by club, season and competition
Club	Season	League			National cup (Note: Includes Svenska Cupen Damer, Women's FA Cup and DFB-Pokal)		League cup		Continental		Total	
Club	Season	Division	Apps	Goals	Apps	Goals	Apps	Goals	Apps	Goals	Apps	Goals
Bollstanäs SK	2012	Norretta	5	2	0	0	—		—		5	2
Bollstanäs SK	2013	Norra Svealand	14	7	1	0	—		—		15	7
Bollstanäs SK	2014	Elitettan	25	8	1	0	—		—		26	8
Bollstanäs SK	Total		44	17	2	0	0	0	0	0	46	17
AIK	2014	Damallsvenskan	0	0	1	0	—		—		1	0
AIK	2015	Damallsvenskan	21	4	1	1	—		—		22	5
AIK	Total		21	4	2	1	0	0	0	0	23	5
Hammarby	2015	Damallsvenskan	0	0	1	0	—		—		1	0
Hammarby	2016	Elitettan	25	9	0	0	—		—		25	9
Hammarby	2017	Damallsvenskan	22	8	4	1	—		—		26	9
Hammarby	2018	Damallsvenskan	11	5	0	0	—		—		11	5
Hammarby	Total		58	22	5	1	0	0	0	0	63	23
BK Häcken	2018	Damallsvenskan	11	7	6	3	—		—		17	10
BK Häcken	2019	Damallsvenskan	22	4	1	0	—		2	0	25	4
BK Häcken	2020	Damallsvenskan	20	4	5	3	—		0	0	25	7
BK Häcken	2021	Damallsvenskan	18	1	1	0	—		5	0	24	1
BK Häcken	Total		71	16	13	6	0	0	7	0	91	22
Brighton & Hove Albion	2021–22	Women's Super League	11	2	1	0	0	0	—		12	2
Brighton & Hove Albion	2022–23	Women's Super League	20	2	4	2	3	0	—		27	4
Brighton & Hove Albion	2023–24	Women's Super League	20	0	3	0	3	0	—		26	0
Brighton & Hove Albion	Total		51	4	8	2	6	0	0	0	65	6
Bayern Munich	2024–25	Frauen-Bundesliga	16	0	4	1	—		5	0	25	1
Manchester United	2025–26	Women's Super League	20	2	2	1	3	0	14	2	39	5
Manchester United	2026–27	Women's Super League	11	4	0	0	2	0	—		13	4
Manchester United	Total		31	6	2	1	5	0	14	2	52	9
Career total			292	69	36	12	11	0	26	2	365	83

=== International ===
As of match played 13 October 2026

Appearances and goals by national team and year
National team	Year	Apps	Goals
Sweden	2018	2	0
Sweden	2019	11	0
Sweden	2020	3	0
Sweden	2021	1	0
Sweden	2022	3	0
Sweden	2023	7	1
Sweden	2024	10	1
Sweden	2025	15	0
Sweden	2026	8	0
Total		60	2

No.	Date	Venue	Opponent	Score	Result	Competition
1.	5 December 2023	La Rosaleda, Málaga, Spain	Spain	1–0	3–5	2023–24 UEFA Women's Nations League
2.	29 October 2024	Gamla Ullevi, Gothenburg, Sweden	Luxembourg	4–0	8–0	UEFA Women's Euro 2025 qualifying play-offs

== Honours ==
BK Häcken

- Damallsvenskan: 2020
- Svenska Cupen: 2019

Bayern Munich

- Frauen-Bundesliga: 2024–25
- DFB-Pokal: 2024–25
- DFB-Supercup: 2024

Manchester United

- Women's League Cup runner-up: 2025–26

Sweden

- FIFA Women's World Cup third place: 2019

Sweden U19

- UEFA Women's Under-19 Championship: 2015

Individual

- Brighton & Hove Albion Player's Player of the Season: 2022-23
- Shadow Football's End of Season Awards 2025/26: Best Signing
