= Sabrina Henriksson-Benhadj =

Swedish footballer

Sabrina Henriksson

Personal information
- Full name: Sabrina Zara Helén Henriksson Benhadj Djillali
- Date of birth: 12 January 1994 (age 32)
- Place of birth: Sweden
- Height: 1.73 m (5 ft 8 in)
- Position: Defender

Senior career*
| Years | Team | Apps | (Gls) |
| 2013 | Kungsbacka DFF | 16 | (4) |
| 2014 | Kvarnsvedens IK | 25 | (1) |
| 2015 | Mallbackens IF | 4 | (0) |
| 2016–2017 | Umeå IK | 14 | (1) |
- * Club domestic league appearances and goals

Sabrina Zara Helén Henriksson Benhadj Djillali (born 12 January 1994) is a Swedish football defender.
