= Tine Schryvers =

Belgian footballer

Personal information
- Full name: Tine Schryvers
- Date of birth: 11 March 1993 (age 33)
- Place of birth: Antwerp, Belgium
- Height: 1.73 m (5 ft 8 in)
- Positions: Forward; midfielder

Team information
- Current team: Club YLA
- Number: 32

College career
Years	Team	Apps	(Gls)
2012	Memphis	18	(6)
2013–2015	Tulsa	17	(0)

Senior career*
Years	Team	Apps	(Gls)
2016	Vålerenga	17	(1)
2017–2018	Kristianstads DFF	28	(3)
2019–2020	Gent		
2020–2021	OH Leuven		
2021-2022	Club YLA	0	(0)

International career^{‡}
2010–2012	Belgium U19	17	(4)
2016	Belgium	6	(3)
- * Club domestic league appearances and goals as of 17 January 2019 ‡ National team caps and goals as of 23 October 2016

Tine Schryvers (born 11 March 1993) is a former Belgian footballer. She played as a forward for Club YLA in Super League Vrouwenvoetbal and the Belgium women's national football team.

== College ==
She attended the University of Memphis for the 2012 season. Prior to the 2013 season, she transferred to the University of Tulsa.

== Club ==
She signed with Vålerenga Fotball Damer in January 2016, but after one season in the Norwegian Toppserien she moved to the Swedish top league to play for Kristianstads DFF.

She signed with Gent in January 2019.

She signed with OH Leuven in April 2020.

For the 2021/22 season she signed for Club YLA. This turned out to be her last season as a football player, as injuries and external factors proved too difficult to overcome.

== International ==
She was called up to the Belgium squad for the 2016 Algarve Cup. She made her senior national team debut in the 4 March 2016 match against Canada.

== Career statistics ==
=== College ===
Club	Season	Apps	Goals
Memphis	2012	18	6
Tulsa	2013	10	0
Tulsa	2014	0	0
Tulsa	2015	7	0
Career totals		35	6

=== Club ===
Club	Season	League		
Club	Season	League	Apps	Goals
Vålerenga	2016	Toppserien	17	1
Kristianstads DFF	2017	Damallsvenskan	11	2
Kristianstads DFF	2018	Damallsvenskan	17	1
Gent	2018–19	Super League Vrouwenvoetbal		
Gent	2019–20	Super League Vrouwenvoetbal		
Career totals			45	4

=== International ===
As of 23 October 2016

Belgium
Year	Apps	Goals
2016	6	3
Total	6	3

=== International goals ===
Scores and results list Belgium's goal tally first.

#	Date	Venue	Opponent	Score	Result	Competition
1.	9 March 2016	Vila Real de Santo António, Portugal	Russia	3–0	5–0	2016 Algarve Cup
2.	12 April 2016	Heverlee, Belgium	Estonia	6–0	6–0	Euro 2017 qualifying
3.	23 October 2016	Tubize, Belgium	Russia	2–0	3–1	Friendly
