= Lisa Hurtig =

Swedish footballer (born 1987)

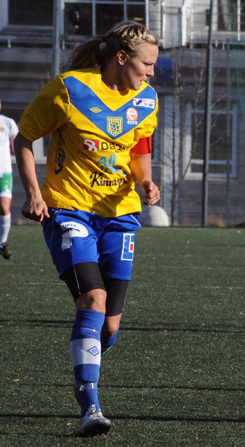
- Captaining Umeå Södra FF in 2013

Personal information
- Full name: Lisa Hurtig Lantz
- Date of birth: 26 August 1987 (age 39)
- Place of birth: Delsbo, Sweden
- Height: 1.76 m (5 ft 9 in)
- Position: Defender

Youth career
- Delsbo IF
- Team Hudik

Senior career*
Years	Team	Apps	(Gls)
2005–2006	Sundsvalls DFF		
2007–2008	Bälinge IF		
2009–2013	Umeå Södra FF		
2014–2016	Umeå IK	60	(4)
2017–2020	Linköpings FC	74	(2)
- * Club domestic league appearances and goals as of 23:51, 2 May 2021 (UTC)

Lisa Hurtig (née Lantz; born 26 August 1987) is a Swedish footballer who played as a defender for Linköpings FC.

== Club career ==
Hurtig started playing football in Delsbo IF and then went to IF Team Hudik. In 2005, she was recruited by Sundsvalls DFF. Hurtig played 43 games for the club in Norrettan over two seasons.

Before the 2007 season, Hurtig went to Bälinge IF. She made her debut in the Damallsvenskan during her time at the club and played a total of 32 matches. Before the 2009 season, Hurtig signed for Umeå Södra. In total, she played five seasons for the club.

In February 2014, Hurtig was recruited by Umeå IK. In March 2015, she was named team captain for the club. In December 2016, Hurtig was signed by Linköpings FC. In November 2017, Hurtig extended her contract at the club by one year. In October 2018, she extended her contract by two years. After the 2020 season, Hurtig retired.

== Personal life ==
She married Lina Hurtig, a teammate at Linköpings FC and also a member of the Sweden national team. In March 2021, Lisa announced she was pregnant with the couple's first child. On June 11, 2021, Lisa gave birth to the couples 1st child. In October 2024, both Lisa and Lina announced Lisa was pregnant with the couple's second child. On 2 December 2024, Lina announced that Lisa had given birth to their second child which the gender hasn't been revealed as of yet.

== Honours ==
Linköpings FC

- Damallsvenskan: 2017
