= Stephan Kullberg =

Swedish footballer

Personal information
- Full name: Stephan Svante Walter Kullberg
- Date of birth: 10 January 1959 (age 67)

Senior career*
Years	Team	Apps	(Gls)
- Åtvidabergs FF
1983–1985	IFK Göteborg	63	(0)
1986–1991	Djurgårdens IF	127	(4)
1992–1993	IF Brommapojkarna	46	(6)
- Gimonäs CK

International career
1975	Sweden U16	2	(0)
1978–1983	Sweden U21	16	(1)
- * Club domestic league appearances and goals

Stephan Svante Walter Kullberg (born 10 January 1959) is a Swedish former football defender. He played for Åtvidabergs FF, IFK Göteborg, Djurgårdens IF, IF Brommapojkarna and Gimonäs CK.

Kullberg played two matches for the Sweden national under-16 football team and then 16 matches for the Sweden national under-21 football team, in which he scored one goal.

Stephen Kullberg is the father of Swedish footballers Emma and Sanna Kullberg, where Sanna also represented Djurgården.
