= Marija Banušić =

Swedish footballer (born 1995)

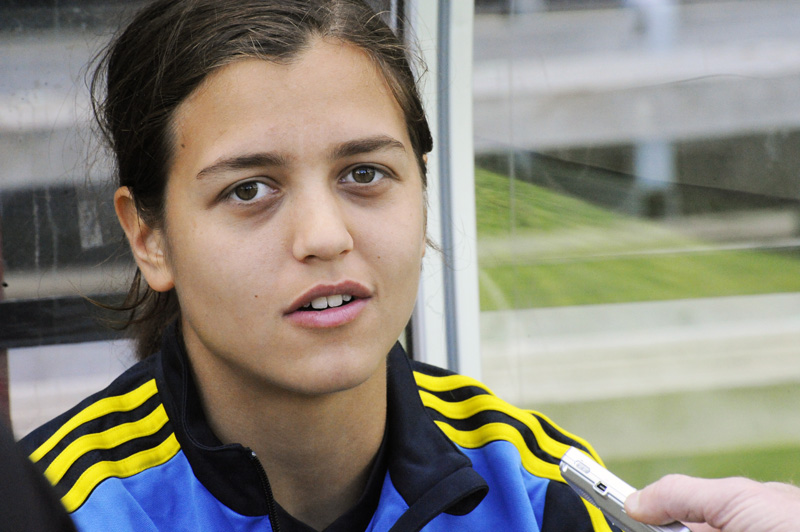

Personal information
- Full name: Marija Maredinho Banušić
- Birth name: Marija Banušić
- Date of birth: 17 September 1995 (age 31)
- Place of birth: Uppsala, Sweden
- Height: 1.76 m (5 ft 9 in)
- Positions: Midfielder; forward

Team information
- Current team: Napoli
- Number: 10

Youth career
- VP
- IK Fyris

Senior career*
Years	Team	Apps	(Gls)
2011	Gamla Upsala SK		
2012	IK Sirius	16	(16)
2013–2014	Kristianstads DFF	33	(7)
2015	Chelsea Ladies	8	(0)
2016	Eskilstuna United DFF	16	(6)
2017–2018	Linköpings FC	26	(13)
2018–2019	Beijing BG Phoenix		
2019–2021	Montpellier	13	(3)
2021	Roma	5	(1)
2021–2022	Pomigliano	21	(7)
2022–2023	Parma	13	(4)
2023–	Napoli	49	(10)

International career^{‡}
2014–2018	Sweden	7	(0)
- * Club domestic league appearances and goals as of 17 May 2026 ‡ National team caps and goals as of 00:52, 2 January 2022 (UTC)

Marija Maredinho Banušić (born 17 September 1995) is a Swedish professional footballer who plays as a midfielder for Italian Serie A club Napoli. She previously played for Linköpings FC, Eskilstuna United DFF and Kristianstads DFF of the Damallsvenskan, spent a season in England with FA WSL club Chelsea, a season in China with Beijing BG Phoenix and two seasons in France with Montpellier before spending half a season with AS Roma in 2021 and then one year with Pomigliano and one year with Parma. She won her first cap for the Sweden women's national team in November 2014. She has previously worn the name Maredinho on her shirt, originally a nickname her father had given her in homage to male footballer Ronaldinho, which she later adopted as her middle name.

== Club career ==
In 2012 Banušić scored 16 goals for Norrettan club IK Sirius and became a transfer target for clubs in the Damallsvenskan, Sweden's top division. Banušić made a favourable early impression after signing for Kristianstads in 2013. Teammate and fellow Uppsala-native Josefine Öqvist called her a potential "världsspelare" (English: world-class player), while coach Elísabet Gunnarsdóttir declared her the biggest talent in the history of Swedish women's football.

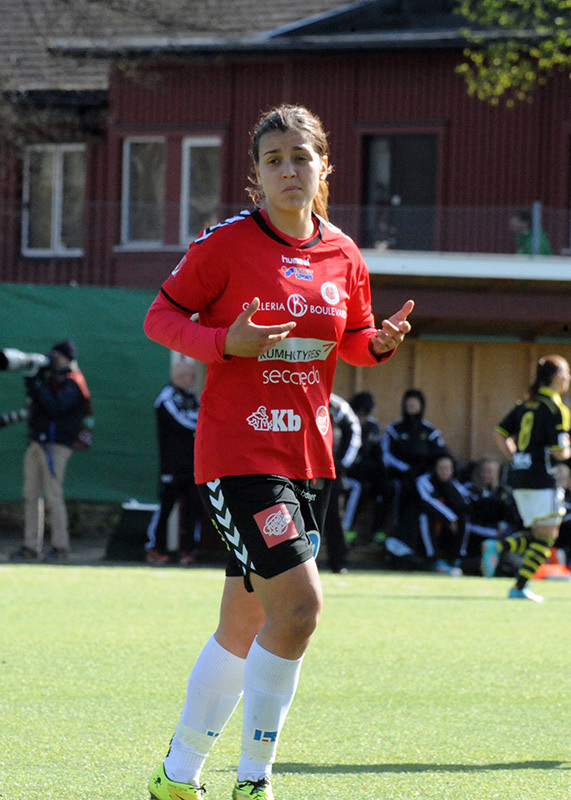
Playing for Kristianstads in 2014

Banušić gave Kristianstads the lead in the 2014 Svenska Cupen (English: Swedish Cup) final, but they were defeated 2–1 by Linköpings FC. After the season she decided to leave Kristianstads and returned to Uppsala, where she considered several offers from other clubs from Sweden and abroad. Banušić agreed a transfer to London-based FA WSL club Chelsea Ladies in January 2015.

With Chelsea Banušić started three of her eight league appearances as the club won the 2015 FA WSL title. She was an unused substitute in Chelsea's 1–0 win over Notts County at the 2015 FA Women's Cup Final, staged at Wembley Stadium for the first time. Banušić had fallen further down the pecking order when Chelsea broke the British transfer record to sign Fran Kirby during the season.

In December 2015 Banušić announced that she would return to Sweden to play for Damallsvenskan club Eskilstuna United DFF in 2016. After moving to Linköpings FC the following season, her new club won the 2017 Damallsvenskan title. While her teammates celebrated, an emotional Banušić invited her critics to eat their words. In July 2018 she was reunited with her former Linköping coach Kim Björkegren when she transferred to the Chinese Women's Super League club Beijing Phoenix.

On 1 February 2021, Banušić signed with Italian Serie A team Roma. She made her Roma debut on 6 February 2021, coming off the substitutes' bench in Roma's 4–0 away victory over Pink Bari. In her third appearance for Roma, Banušić scored an overhead kick against Inter Milan in what would prove to be the winning goal on the day. Banušić was also part of the Roma squad that won the 2021 Coppa Italia final against AC Milan in May 2021.

In total, Banušić made five appearances for Roma and scored one goal during her half-year stay in the Italian capital. On 14 July 2021, it was announced that Banušić had moved from Roma to newly-promoted Serie A club Pomigliano. Seven goals in 21 appearances helped Pomigliano avoid relegation, before Banušić signed for Parma in July 2022.

On 2 August 2023 she signed for newly-promoted Serie A club Napoli.

== International career ==
In June 2013 Banušić was named in senior national team coach Pia Sundhage's squad for a 1–1 friendly draw with Brazil. She was hopeful of a surprise call-up to Sweden's UEFA Women's Euro 2013 squad, but was not selected and went to the 2013 UEFA Women's Under-19 Championship instead.

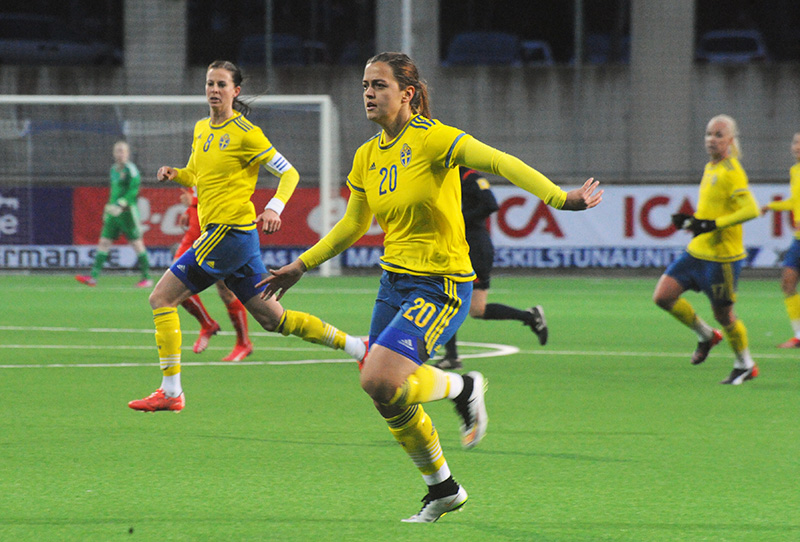
Playing for Sweden in 2015

In November 2014 Banušić made her senior Sweden debut against Canada in Los Angeles. The match, which finished in a 1–0 defeat, was played behind closed doors but still counted as a full FIFA international fixture. Banušić was disappointed with the result but satisfied with her performance after coming on as a second-half substitute. She hoped to stay in contention for a place at the 2015 FIFA Women's World Cup. She was particularly disappointed to be dropped from the national team for UEFA Women's Euro 2017, although she was recalled shortly afterwards.

Because of her Croatian origin, she was also eligible to represent Croatia.
