= 2018 Damallsvenskan =

Damallsvenskan
- Season: 2018
- Champions: Piteå IF
- Relegated: Hammarby IF; IFK Kalmar
- Champions League: Piteå IF; Kopparbergs/Göteborg FC
- Matches: 132
- Goals: 412 (3.12 per match)
- Top goalscorer: Anja Mittag (17 goals)
- Biggest home win: ROS 10–0 Kalmar
- Biggest away win: KAL 1–9 ROS
- Highest attendance: 4,423 Kopparbergs v Rosengard
- Lowest attendance: 118 Bunkeflo v Växjö
- Average attendance: 894
- All statistics correct as of 20 May 2018.

The 2018 Damallsvenskan was the 30th season of the Swedish Women's association football top division, Damallsvenskan. It began on 14 April 2018 and ended on 27 October the same year. Linköpings FC were the defending champions, having won the competition in 2017.

Piteå IF won the series, and so also their first Swedish National Championship title.

== Teams ==
Locations of the 2018 Damallsvenskan

Team	Location	Stadium	Stadium capacity^{1}
Djurgårdens IF	Stockholm	Stockholm Olympic Stadium	14,417
Eskilstuna United DFF	Eskilstuna	Tunavallen	7,600
FC Rosengård	Malmö	Malmö IP	5,700
Kopparbergs/Göteborg FC	Gothenburg	Valhalla IP	4,000
Linköpings FC	Linköping	Arena Linköping	8,500
Piteå IF	Piteå	LF Arena	3,000
Vittsjö GIK	Vittsjö	Vittsjö IP	3,000
IF Limhamn Bunkeflo	Malmö	Limhamns IP	2,800
Hammarby IF	Stockholm	Zinkensdamms IP	3,000
Kristianstads DFF	Kristianstad	Vilans IP	5,000
IFK Kalmar	Kalmar	Guldfågeln Arena	12,182
Växjö DFF	Växjö	Myresjöhus Arena	12,173

Note: ^{1} According to each club information page at the Swedish Football Association website for Damallsvenskan.

== League table ==
Pos	Team	Pld	W	D	L	GF	GA	GD	Pts	Qualification or relegation
1	Piteå IF (C)	22	16	0	6	42	24	+18	48	Qualification to 2019–2020 Champions League
2	Kopparbergs/Göteborg FC	22	15	2	5	54	27	+27	47	Qualification to 2019–2020 Champions League
3	FC Rosengård	22	14	3	5	55	18	+37	45	
4	Kristianstads DFF	22	11	6	5	30	26	+4	39	
5	Linköpings FC	22	9	6	7	47	31	+16	33	
6	Eskilstuna United DFF	22	9	4	9	30	36	−6	31	
7	Växjö DFF	22	9	2	11	29	33	−4	29	
8	Djurgårdens IF	22	7	6	9	25	30	−5	27	
9	Vittsjö GIK	22	7	5	10	32	26	+6	26	
10	IF Limhamn Bunkeflo	22	8	2	12	25	40	−15	26	
11	Hammarby IF (R)	22	8	0	14	29	39	−10	24	Relegation to Elitettan
12	IFK Kalmar (R)	22	1	0	21	14	82	−68	3	Relegation to Elitettan

Updated to match(es) played on 27 October 2018. Source: svenskfotboll.se
Rules for classification: 1) Points; 2) Goal difference; 3) Number of goals scored; 4) Head-to-head points; 5) Head-to-head goal difference; 6) Head-to-head away goals scored
(C) Champions; (R) Relegated

== Attendance ==
=== Home attendances ===
Team	GP	Attendance	High	Low	Average
Hammarby IF	2	3,988	2,369	1,619	1,994
Eskilstuna United DFF	3	4,554	1,957	1,270	1,518
Piteå IF	3	3,714	1,448	1,018	1,238
Kristianstads DFF	3	3,135	1,518	382	1,045
Djurgårdens IF	2	1,966	1,033	933	983
IFK Kalmar	3	2,662	1,398	487	887
Kopparbergs/Göteborg FC	2	1,410	825	585	705
FC Rosengård	2	1,351	895	456	675
Linköpings FC	2	1,316	805	511	658
Vittsjö GIK	3	1,850	669	555	616
Växjö DFF	2	919	473	446	459
IF Limhamn Bunkeflo	3	858	356	228	286
Total	30	27,723	2,369	228	924

Updated to games played on 20 May 2018.

=== Highest attendances ===
Rank	Home team	Score	Away team	Attendance	Date	Stadium
1	Kopparbergs/Göteborg FC	4–2	FC Rosengård	4,423	27 October 2018	Ullevi
2	Hammarby IF	0–1	Djurgårdens IF	4,197	27 May 2018	Tele2 Arena
3	Piteå IF	6–1	Växjö DFF	3,778	27 October 2018	LF Arena
4	IF Limhamn Bunkeflo	0–2	FC Rosengård	3,122	31 May 2018	Stadion
5	Piteå IF	4–3	Kopparbergs/Göteborg FC	3,022	12 August 2018	LF Arena
6	Piteå IF	4–2	Linköpings FC	2,789	30 September 2018	LF Arena
7	FC Linköping	1–1	Vittsjö GIK	2,597	5 August 2018	Linköping Arena
8	Hammarby IF	4–2	IF Limhamn Bunkeflo	2,369	14 April 2018	Hammarby IP
9	Piteå IF	0–1	Kristianstads DFF	2,328	26 August 2018	LF Arena
10	Piteå IF	0–2	FC Rosengård	2,296	16 June 2018	Lombia IP

Updated to games played on 27 October 2018.

== Top scorers ==
As of End of season.

Player	Club	Goals
(Germany) Anja Mittag	FC Rosengård	17
(Sweden) Anna Anvegård	Växjö DFF	14
(Sweden) Rebecka Blomqvist	Kopparbergs/Göteborg FC	14
(Sweden) Julia Zigiotti Olme	Kopparbergs/Göteborg FC	12
(Sweden) Julia Karlenäs	Piteå IF	11
