= Madelen Janogy =

Swedish footballer (born 1995)

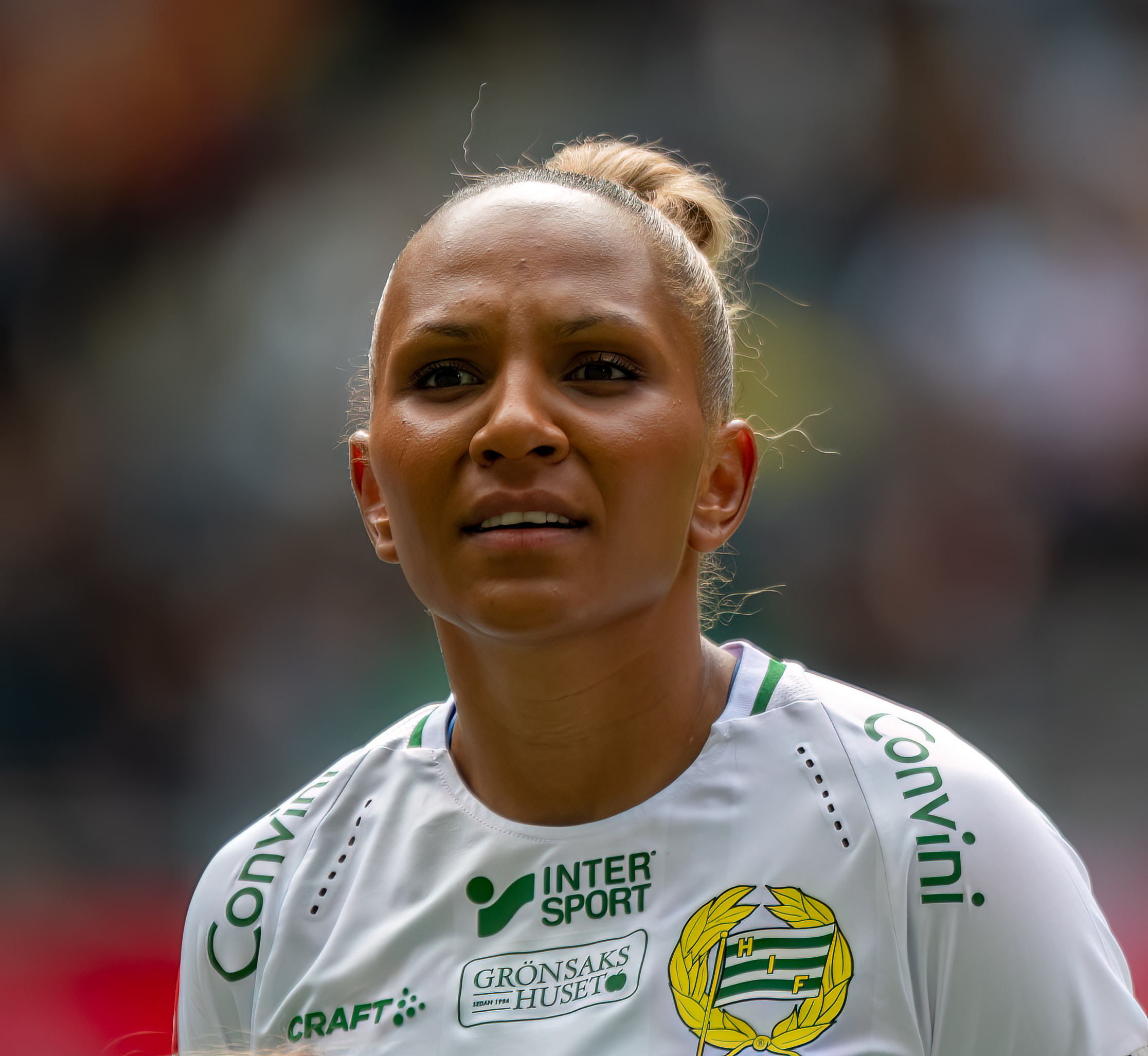
- Janogy with Hammarby in 2022

Personal information
- Full name: Madelen Fatimma Maria Janogy
- Date of birth: 12 November 1995 (age 30)
- Place of birth: Falköping, Sweden
- Height: 1.64 m (5 ft 4 1/2 in)
- Position: Forward

Team information
- Current team: Fiorentina
- Number: 9

Senior career*
Years	Team	Apps	(Gls)
2011–2014	Falköpings KIK	53	(48)
2014–2016	Mallbackens IF	48	(11)
2017–2019	Piteå IF	62	(19)
2019–2020	Wolfsburg	0	(0)
2020	Piteå IF	12	(3)
2021–2023	Hammarby IF	66	(32)
2024–	Fiorentina	14	(9)

International career^{‡}
2019–	Sweden	43	(10)
Medal record
Women's soccer
Representing Sweden
Olympic Games
Silver medal – second place	2020 Tokyo	Team
FIFA Women's World Cup
Bronze medal – third place	2019 France	Team
- * Club domestic league appearances and goals as of 11 November 2023 ‡ National team caps and goals as of 24 February 2024

Madelen Fatimma Maria Janogy (born 12 November 1995) is a Swedish professional footballer who plays as a forward for Serie A club Fiorentina and the Sweden national team.

== Club career ==
=== Falköping and Mallbacken ===
Janogy started to play youth football with hometown team Falköpings KIK at age 11. In 2010, she made her senior debut for the club in Division 1, by then the second highest domestic tier, making three appearances. In 2013, Janogy had her major breakthrough, scoring 32 goals in 21 games in Division 1, which by then had become the domestic third tier.

In 2014, Janogy moved to Mallbackens IF in Elitettan, the Swedish second tier, helping the side to win the league and reach promotion. In 2015, during her debut season in Damallsvenskan, Janogy scored twice in 21 games, helping her side finish 10th in the table, avoiding relegation. In 2016, Janogy scored five goals in 22 appearances, but was unable to help the side from finishing at the foot of the Damallsvenskan table.

=== Piteå IF ===
In 2017, Janogy joined Piteå IF in Damallsvenskan, together with her teammate Julia Karlernäs from Mallbacken. In her first season with the club, Janogy scored seven goals in 22 appearances, helping Piteå finish 4th in the table. On 2 November 2017, she signed a new one-year contract, with an option for a further year.

In 2018, Piteå won their first ever Damallsvenskan title. Janogy scored four goals in 21 league appearances throughout the season, most notably a brace in the title deciding 6–1 win against Växjö in the last round.

In 2019, Janogy scored eight goals in 19 league games, although Piteå was unable to repeat their success in Damallsvenskan, finishing 6th in the table. In the 2019–20 UEFA Women's Champions League, Piteå was knocked out by Danish club Brøndby IF in the round of 32 by 1–2 on aggregate, with Janogy featuring in both legs. At the end of the year, it was announced that Janogy would leave Piteå at the expiration of her contract.

=== Wolfsburg ===
On 19 December 2019, Janogy signed a one-and-a-half-year contract with defending German Bundesliga champions Wolfsburg, effective in January 2020. On 1 July 2020, about six months after her arrival, Janogy left Wolfsburg by mutual consent without making any competitive appearances. She later revealed that she suffered from a mental illness while at the club.

=== Return to Piteå ===
On 5 August 2020, after taking a break from football for a couple of months, Janogy returned to her former club Piteå IF in Damallsvenskan, signing a one-and-a-half-year contract. After returning to the pitch, Janogy scored three goals in 12 appearances. In November the same year, it was announced that she had exercised an option in her contract to leave the club.

=== Hammarby IF ===
On 22 December 2020, Janogy moved to Hammarby IF, that just had been promoted to Damallsvenskan, signing a two-year contract. In 2021, Janogy scored 10 goals in 21 appearances, helping the side to finish 7th in the table. Janogy was voted Hammarby Player of the Year by the supporters of the club. She was also nominated for the award of Damallsvenskan Forward of the Year, but the prize eventually went to Stina Blackstenius from BK Häcken.

In 2022, Janogy suffered from injuries, but still managed to score 11 goals in 21 appearances, helping Hammarby finish 5th in the Damallsvenskan table. On 22 December 2022, Janogy signed a new one-year contract with the club.

On 6 June 2023, Hammarby won the 2022–23 Svenska Cupen. Janogy scored a brace in the final, that ended in a 3–0 win at home against BK Häcken. The club also won the 2023 Damallsvenskan, claiming its second Swedish championship after 38 years, with Janogy scoring 12 goals in 24 appearances. At the end of the season, Janogy was awarded the Damallsvenskan prize Forward of the Year, while also leaving the club following the expiration of her contract.

=== Fiorentina ===
On 3 January 2024, Janogy joined Italian club Fiorentina on a free transfer, signing a contract until June 2026.

== International career ==
Janogy made her senior Sweden debut on 22 January 2019, coming on as a 61st minute substitute in a goalless draw against South Africa. She scored her first international goal on 31 May 2019 in a 1–0 friendly win against South Korea. Janogy was part of the squad for the 2019 FIFA Women's World Cup, scoring in stoppage time against Chile after subbing on in the 81st minute to help secure a 2–0 win in Sweden's opening game of the tournament. She made three appearances at the 2019 World Cup, all from the bench.

On 13 June 2023, she was included in the 23-player squad for the FIFA Women's World Cup 2023.

=== International goals ===
Goal	Date	Location	Opponent	Score	Result	Competition
1	2019-05-31	Gothenburg, Sweden	South Korea	1–0	1–0	Friendly
2	2019-06-11	Rennes, France	Chile	0–2	0–2	2019 FIFA Women's World Cup
3	2019-10-04	Miskolc, Hungary	Hungary	0–2	0–5	Euro 2022 qualifying
4	2019-10-04	Miskolc, Hungary	Hungary	0–3	0–5	Euro 2022 qualifying
5	2021-07-27	Rifu, Japan	New Zealand	0–2	0–2	Olympics 2021
6	2022-10-11	Gothenburg, Sweden	France	3–0	3–0	Friendly
7	2023-02-16	Marbella, Spain	China	2–0	4–1	Friendly
8	2023-02-16	Marbella, Spain	China	3–0	4–1	Friendly
9	2024-02-23	Bosnia and Herzegovina FA Training Centre, Zenica, Bosnia	Bosnia and Herzegovina	1–0	5–0	2023–24 UEFA Women's Nations League promotion/relegation matches
10	2024-02-23	Bosnia and Herzegovina FA Training Centre, Zenica, Bosnia	Bosnia and Herzegovina	2–0	5–0	2023–24 UEFA Women's Nations League promotion/relegation matches

== Personal life ==
Janogy was born and raised in Falköping. Her mother is Swedish and her father is from Mali, making her the first player in Sweden women's national football team history with African roots. Both Madelen and her twin sister, Victoria, are named after the princesses of the Swedish royal family.

== Honours ==
=== Club ===
Mallbackens IF

- Elitettan: 2014

Piteå IF

- Damallsvenskan: 2018

Hammarby IF

- Svenska Cupen: 2022–23
- Damallsvenskan: 2023

=== International ===
Sweden

- Summer Olympic Games silver medal: 2020
- FIFA Women's World Cup third place: 2019, 2023

=== Individual ===
- Damallsvenskan Forward of the Year: 2023
