= Clara Gorry =

Swedish footballer (born 1989)

Clara Markstedt
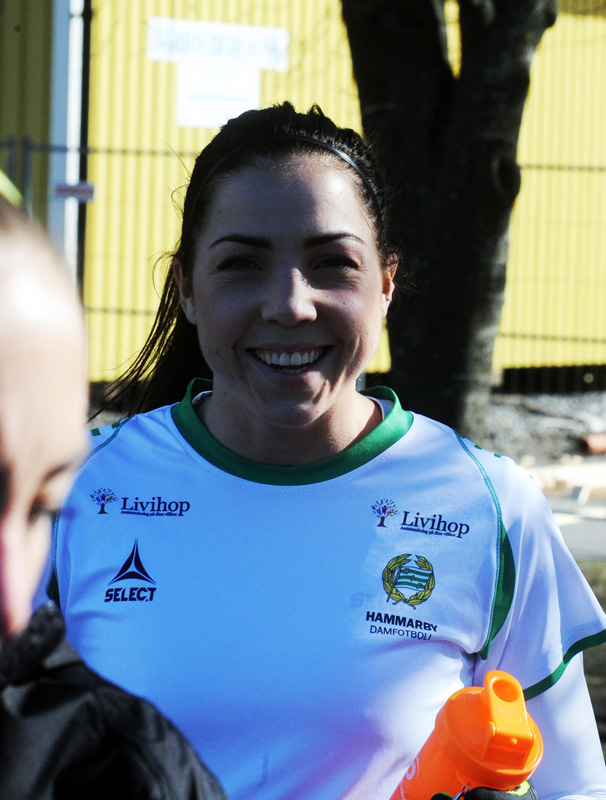

Personal information
- Full name: Clara Anna Linnea Markstedt
- Date of birth: 20 August 1989 (age 37)
- Place of birth: Sweden
- Position: Forward

Senior career*
Years	Team	Apps	(Gls)
2010–2012	AIK Fotboll	63	(22)
2013–2014	Piteå IF	39	(5)
2015	Hammarby IF DFF	18	(2)
2016–2023	Vittsjö GIK	155	(51)
- * Club domestic league appearances and goals as of 01:30, 21 September 2023 (UTC)

Clara Anna Linnea Gorry (née Markstedt; born 20 August 1989) is a Swedish footballer and artist.

== Artist career ==
Markstedt is also an artist who exhibits her paintings.

== Personal life ==
She is married to Australian footballer Katrina Gorry. Markstedt and Gorry have announced that Markstedt is pregnant with their first child together and will retire from football. Koby was born in 2024, and is the younger brother of Harper.
