= Hanna Sandström =

Swedish footballer

Personal information
- Full name: Hanna Sandström
- Date of birth: 15 August 1995 (age 31)
- Place of birth: Sweden
- Position: Midfielder

Senior career*
Years	Team	Apps	(Gls)
2012–2016	Umeå IK	57	(8)
2017–2018	Kristianstads DFF	38	(4)

International career
2012	Sweden U17	2	(0)
- * Club domestic league appearances and goals as of 27 October 2018

Hanna Sandström (born 15 August 1995) is a Swedish footballer who played for Kristianstads DFF and Umeå IK.
