= Julia Karlernäs =

Swedish footballer (born 1993)

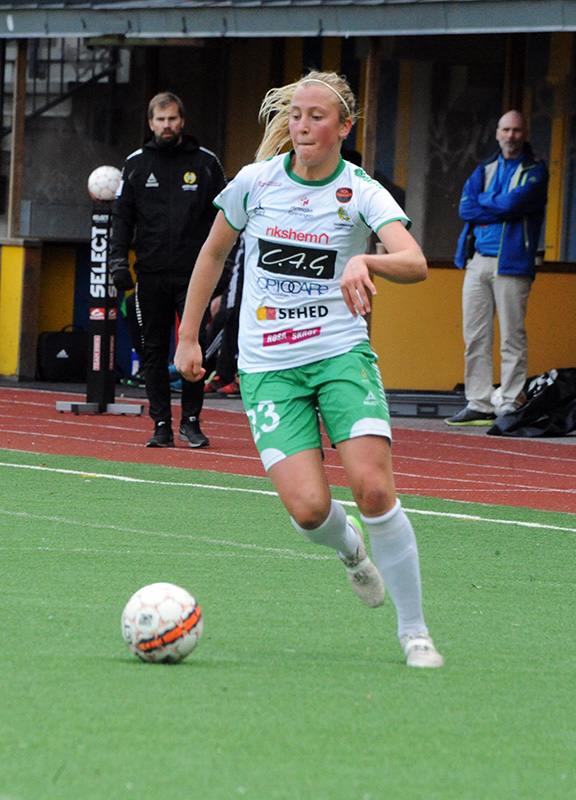
- Karlernäs with Hammarby in 2015

Personal information
- Full name: Julia Helena Maria Karlernäs
- Date of birth: 6 October 1993 (age 33)
- Place of birth: Torsby, Sweden
- Height: 1.75 m (5 ft 9 in)
- Position: Midfielder

Team information
- Current team: Brommapojkarna
- Number: 16

Youth career
- Västanvik

College career
Years	Team	Apps	(Gls)
2014	Embry–Riddle Eagles	21	(8)

Senior career*
Years	Team	Apps	(Gls)
2009–2014	Mallbacken	78	(17)
2015	Hammarby	21	(1)
2016	Mallbacken	22	(3)
2017–2020	Piteå	102	(38)
2020–2021	Sevilla	19	(0)
2021–2022	Häcken	13	(0)
2022–2025	Como	70	(16)
2025–	Brommapojkarna	10	(1)

International career^{‡}
2018–	Sweden	5	(0)
- * Club domestic league appearances and goals as of 19 October 2025 ‡ National team caps and goals as of 10:16, 29 June 2019 (UTC)

Julia Karlernäs (also spelled Karlenäs; born 6 October 1993) is a Swedish professional footballer who plays as a midfielder for Damallsvenskan club IF Brommapojkarna and the Sweden women's national team.

== Club career ==
In the 2018 Damallsvenskan season, Karlernäs's 11 goals from midfield helped Piteå secure the League title and won her the Most Valuable Player award. She signed a new contract with the club shortly afterwards.

== International career ==
Karlernäs was called up to the senior Sweden squad for the first time in June 2018. On 30 August 2018 she won her first cap as a substitute in a 3–0 2019 FIFA Women's World Cup qualifying win over Ukraine at Gamla Ullevi. She won a second cap and made her first start for the national team in October, in a 2–1 win over rivals Norway.

Karlernäs has competed in the UEFA Women's champions league with Piteå IF in 2019 and with BK Häcken in 2021.
