= Elin Bragnum =

Swedish football midfielder (born 1994)

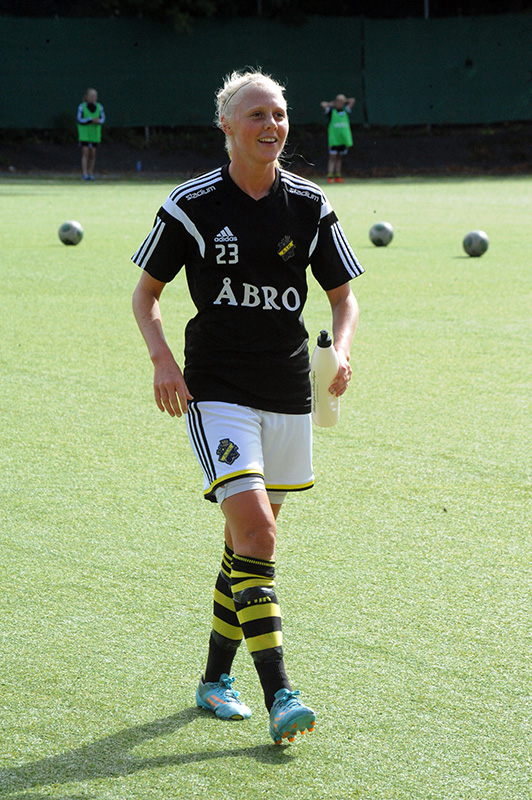
- Bragnum in 2014

Personal information
- Full name: Elin Bragnum
- Date of birth: 1 May 1994 (age 32)
- Height: 1.66 m (5 ft 5 1/2 in)
- Position: Midfielder

Team information
- Current team: Tyresö FF

Senior career*
Years	Team	Apps	(Gls)
2010–2015	AIK	60	(1)
2016–2019	Pitea	41	(5)
2024–	Tyresö		

International career
2010–2011	Sweden U17	5	(1)
2012–2013	Sweden U19	9	(0)
2013	Sweden U23	2	(1)
- * Club domestic league appearances and goals as of 9 May 2024

Elin Bragnum (born 1 May 1994) is a Swedish football midfielder who plays for Tyresö FF in Division 1. She previously played for AIK and Piteå IF and has represented Sweden at the under-17, under-19, and under-23 levels.
