= Kungsbacka DFF =

Swedish women's association football club

- Full name: Kungsbacka DFF
- Founded: 2013; 12 years ago
- Ground: Tingbergsvallen, Kungsbacka
- Capacity: 760
- President: Gunilla Gustafsson
- Coach: Henrik Korhonen
- League: Damallsvenskan
- 2018: Elitettan, 1st (promoted)
- Website: https://www.kungsbackadff.se/
Home colours

Kungsbacka DFF is a football club from Kungsbacka, in Halland County, Sweden. The club was established in 2013 and was promoted into the Women's Premier Division (Damallsvenskan) for the first time in 2018.

The club play their home games at Tingbergsvallen in Kungsbacka. The team colours are orange and black. The club is affiliated to the Hallands Fotbollförbund.

== History ==
Kungsbacka DFF were conceived as a collaboration between several local football clubs to bring elite women's football to the area. In December 2012, the Swedish Football Association (SvFF) gave dispensation for Tölö IF's place in Division 1 to be given to the new club.

Ahead of their first season in the second level Elitettan in 2015, Kungsbacka DFF appointed prominent former national team players Johanna Almgren and Stina Segerström as their management team.

In 2018 Kungsbacka DFF won the Elitettan title, securing promotion to the top level Damallsvenskan for the first time in 2019. This was despite financial difficulties caused by Kungsbacka Municipality's failure to provide support they had promised. The club also faced the prospect of playing all their Damallsvenskan games away from home, as their Tingbergsvallen ground fell below the standard required by the league.

== Current squad ==
As of 4 July 2020

Note: Flags indicate national team as defined under FIFA eligibility rules; some limited exceptions apply. Players may hold more than one non-FIFA nationality.

No. / Pos. / Nation / Player; 4 / DF / (Sweden) SWE / Lina Gerhardsson	No. / Pos. / Nation / Player; 20 / DF / (Sweden) SWE / Malin Fors

=== Former players ===
For details of current and former players, see Category:Kungsbacka DFF players.

== Honours ==
- Elitettan (Tier 2)
  - Winners: 2018
