= Mia Jalkerud =

Swedish footballer

Personal information
- Full name: Mia Jalkerud
- Date of birth: 5 November 1989 (age 37)
- Place of birth: Stockholm, Sweden
- Position: Forward

Youth career
- Enskede

Senior career*
Years	Team	Apps	(Gls)
2006–2007	Enskede		
2008	Djurgården	12	(0)
2009–2010	Vasalund		
2011–2012	Djurgården	44	(14)
2013	Avaldsnes	8	(1)
2014–2019	Djurgården	137	(90)
2021	Arna-Bjørnar	9	(5)
2021–2022	Eskilstuna United	28	(8)
- * Club domestic league appearances and goals

Mia Jalkerud (born 5 November 1989) is a Swedish football forward. She has played Damallsvenskan football for Djurgårdens IF and Eskilstuna United.

== Career ==
Jalkerud has played for Enskede IK, Djurgårdens IF, Vasalunds IF and Avaldsnes.
