= Josefin Johansson =

Swedish footballer (born 1988)

Personal information
- Full name: Josefin Johansson
- Date of birth: 17 March 1988 (age 38)
- Place of birth: Sweden,
- Height: 1.60 m (5 ft 3 in)
- Position: Midfielder

Team information
- Current team: Piteå IF
- Number: 4

Senior career*
Years	Team	Apps	(Gls)
2008–2011	Sunnanå SK	37	(3)
2011–	Piteå IF	96	(19)
- * Club domestic league appearances and goals

Josefin Johansson (born 17 March 1988) is a Swedish football midfielder currently playing for Piteå IF in the Damallsvenskan.
