= Linköping Arena =

Association football stadium in Linköping, Sweden

Coordinates: 58°25′5″N 15°38′57″E

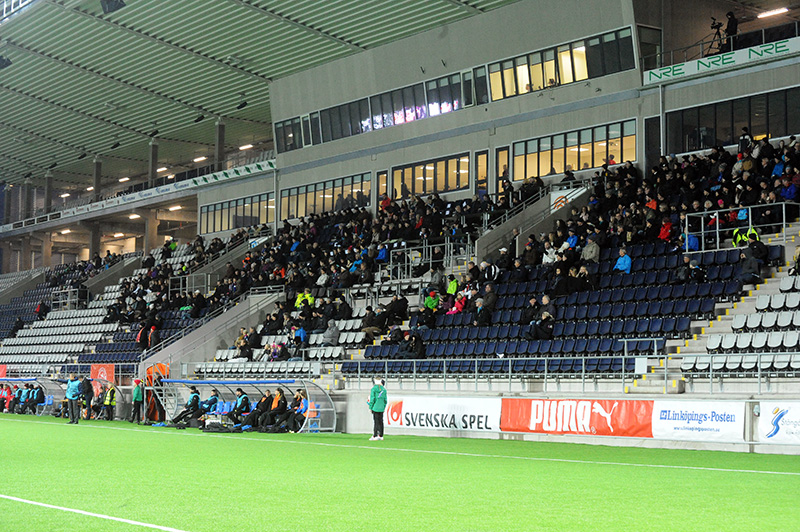
- Linköping Arena in November 2014
- Interactive map of Linköping Arena
- Location: Linköping, Sweden
- Capacity: 7,400

Construction
- Groundbreaking: 29 August 2011
- Opened: 5 May 2013

Tenant
- Linköpings FC (2013–)

The Linköping Arena, also known by its sponsored name Bilbörsen Arena, is an association football stadium in Linköping, Sweden. Opened in 2013, the stadium has a capacity of 7,400 and hosted four games at the UEFA Women's Euro 2013 tournament. Following the tournament, the stadium became home to Linköpings FC women's association football team. The name was discussed for a while and the project name was Arena Linköping before at the inauguration it was announced as Linköping Arena. In April 2023, Bilbörsen bought the rights to the stadium and it was renamed Bilbörsen Arena.
