= Tunavallen =

Sports venue in Eskilstuna, Sweden

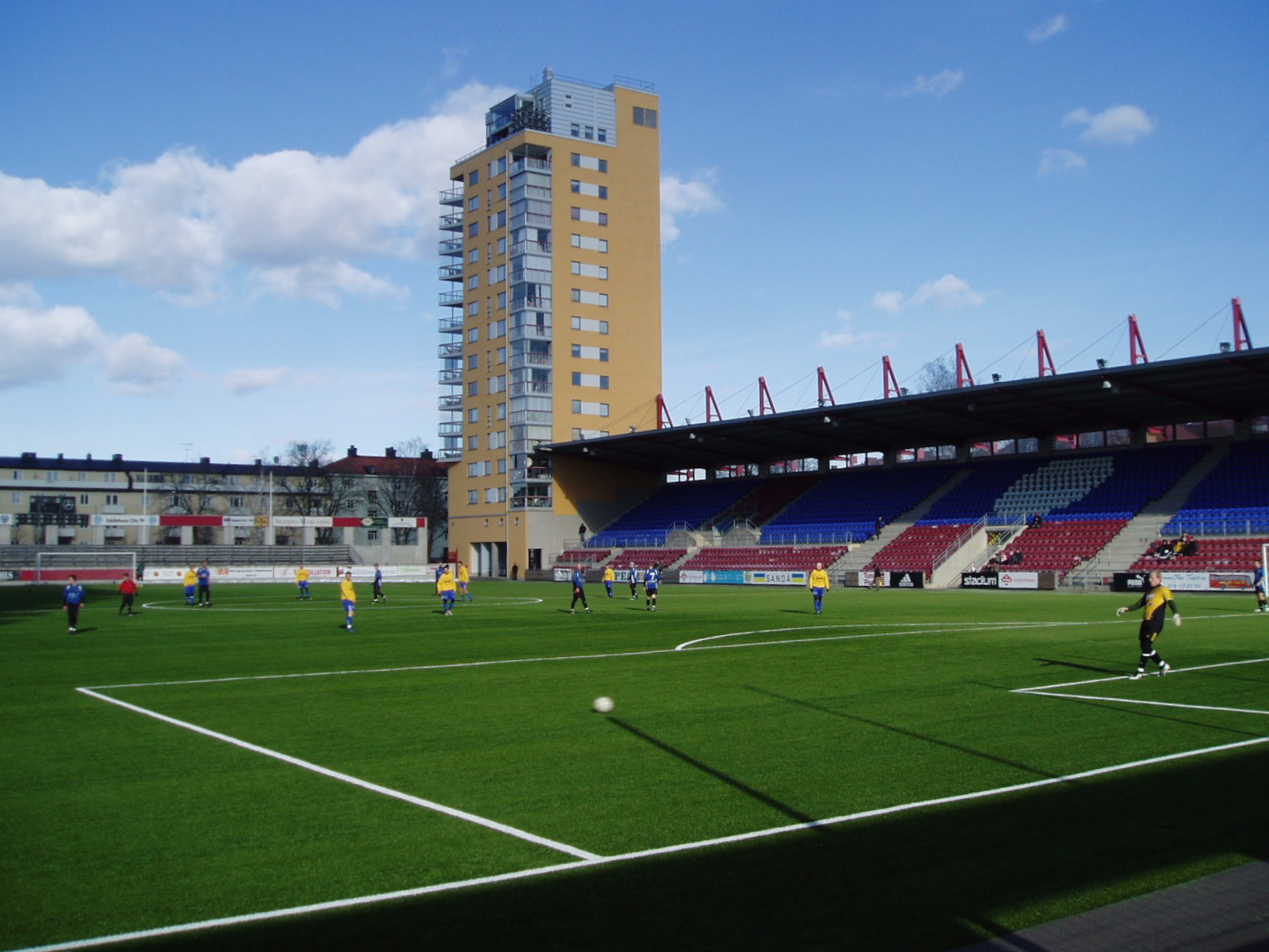
- Tunavallen in 2011
- Interactive map of Tunavallen
- Location: Eskilstuna, Sweden
- Coordinates: 59°22′14″N 16°29′42″E
- Owner: Eskilstuna Municipality
- Capacity: 7,800

Construction
- Opened: 1924
- Renovated: 2002

Tenants
- Eskilstuna City FK; IFK Eskilstuna; Eskilstuna United DFF; AFC Eskilstuna (2017–)

Tunavallen is a multi-use stadium in Eskilstuna, Sweden. It is currently used mostly for football matches. The stadium holds 7,800 seated spectators.

Work was underway on its construction by 1922. Tunavallen was inaugurated on 25 May 1924, with Gustaf VI Adolf and Louise Mountbatten in attendance.

The original stadium was one of the venues for the 1958 FIFA World Cup. It was also the venue for the replay of the Swedish bandy final in 1954. The capacity was 22,000 spectators.

In 2002 a new arena was built. This is the home ground for the football teams AFC Eskilstuna and Eskilstuna City FK.
