= LF Arena =

Football stadium in Piteå, Sweden

Coordinates: 65.3240°N 21.4749°E

LF Arena, previosly known as Kvarnvallen, is a football stadium in Piteå, Sweden, and the home stadium for the football team Piteå IF. LF Arena has a total capacity of 6,500 spectators. It has been named after the insurance company LF since 2007. The current naming rights agreement runs until 2027. The arena was first used in 1939 in a match between IFK Piteås and Degerfors IF.
