= Piteå IF =

- Full name: Piteå Idrottsförening
- Founded: 1985; 41 years ago
- Ground: LF Arena, Piteå
- Capacity: 3,950
- Chairman: Berndt Siljemark
- Coach: Fredrik Bernhardsson
- League: Damallsvenskan
- 2025: 9th
- Website: https://www.piteaif.se/
Home colours	Away colours

Piteå Idrottsförening (Swedish: [ˈpǐːtɛɔ iːˌdrɔtsfœrˈeːnɪŋ]), commonly known as Piteå IF ([ˈpǐːtɛɔ iːɛf]), is a Swedish football club located in Piteå that currently competes in Sweden's top-division women's league, Damallsvenskan, which it won in 2018.

== History ==
The sports club Piteå IF was formed on 24 May 1918 but did not take up men's football until 1920 when they merged with IFK Piteå, who then dissolved. The women's team was founded in 1985. Piteå IF's women's department reached the top-tier Damallsvenskan for the first time in 2009.

In the 2018 season, they won the Swedish national title for the first time. In May 2024, they won their first Swedish Cup title. On 1 October 2024, it was presented that the coach Stellan Carlsson would leave Piteå IF after 13 seasons to join IFK Norrköping for the upcoming 2025 season. Fredrik Bernhardsson took over the role as coach after Carlsson.

The club has one of the largest football youth academies in the county of Norrbotten and is one of two clubs who arrange the large international youth soccer cup, the Piteå Summer Games.

== Players ==
=== Current squad ===
As of 23 December 2025

Note: Flags indicate national team as defined under FIFA eligibility rules; some limited exceptions apply. Players may hold more than one non-FIFA nationality.

No.	Pos.	Nation	Player
1	GK	SWE	Moa Öhman
2	MF	SWE	Thea Eriksson
3	DF	FRO	Ásla Johannesen
4	MF	SWE	Josefin Johansson
5	DF	SWE	Wilma Carlsson
6	MF	SWE	Olivia Holm
7	MF	SWE	Sara Eriksson
8	FW	SWE	Emma Åström
9	FW	SWE	Tuva Skoog
10	FW	NGA	Anam Imo
11	FW	SWE	Cecilia Edlund (captain)
12	FW	SWE	Saga Swedman

No.	Pos.	Nation	Player
13	GK	LVA	Elza Strazdiņa
14	DF	NGA	Faith Michael
15	MF	SWE	Ellen Löfqvist
16	DF	SWE	Maja Green
17	MF	SWE	Selina Henriksson
18	DF	SWE	Selma Åström
19	FW	SWE	Emma Viklund
20	FW	SWE	Matilda Ekblom
21	DF	SWE	Ronja Aronsson
26	FW	SWE	Evelina Moberg

== Stadium ==
The club plays their home matches at LF Arena, better known as "Kvarnvallen" by the local population.

== Honours ==
=== Domestic ===
==== League ====
- Damallsvenskan (Tier 1)
  - Winners (1): 2018

==== Cups ====
- Swedish Cup (Tier 1)
  - Winners (1): 2023–24
