= Kristianstads DFF =

- Full name: Kristianstads DFF
- Nickname: KDFF
- Founded: 1998
- Ground: Kristianstads Fotbollsarena, Kristianstad
- Capacity: 3,080
- Chairman: Anders Flügel
- Head coaches: Johanna Almgren; Daniel Angergård
- League: Damallsvenskan
- 2025: 6th
- Website: http://www.kdff.nu
Home colours	Away colours

Kristianstads DFF (Swedish: [krɪˈɧǎnːstas ˌdeːɛfˈɛfː]) is a women's association football club from Kristianstad, Sweden. The club is affiliated to the Scania Football Association.

== History ==
Wä IF was founded in 1935 and their women team played from 1990 to 1994 and again in 1998 in the Damallsvenskan. The team merged on 5 November 1998 with the women team of Kristianstads FF to become Kristianstad/Wä DFF. The team continued as Kristianstad/Wä DFF during the seasons of 1999 until 2001 in the Damallsvenskan. In 2006 the club was renamed to the current name Kristianstads DFF. Prominent players to have represented the club include Malin Andersson, Therese Sjögran, Sara Johansson and Nilla Fischer. In 2005 the team finished third in the Söderettan, before winning the Söderettan unbeaten in 2008 and clinching promotion to the Damallsvenskan. In July 2009 the players posed for a nude team photograph, to raise funds as the club was in financial difficulty. In 2018, the club changed their homeground from Vilans IP to Kristianstads Fotbollsarena. In the same year the team achieved their best league placing since their foundation, securing a fourth-place finish in the Damallsvenskan.

=== Homeground ===
Kristianstads DFF play their home games at Kristianstads Fotbollsarena in Kristianstad.

=== Club colours ===
The team colours are Orange shirt and black shorts and socks for home games and white for away games.

=== Managers ===
- (Sweden) Ulf Berglund (2008–2009)
- (Sweden) Pierre Persson (2010–2011)
- (Iceland) Elísabet Gunnarsdóttir (2009–2023)
- (Sweden) Johanna Almgren (2024–2025)
- (Sweden) Nik Chamberlain (2026– )

== Current squad ==
As of 16 August 2025

Note: Flags indicate national team as defined under FIFA eligibility rules; some limited exceptions apply. Players may hold more than one non-FIFA nationality.

No.	Pos.	Nation	Player
1	GK	SWE	Malva Mellblom
2	DF	SWE	Sofia Reidy
3	MF	SWE	Mathilde Janzen
4	FW	SWE	Alice Egnér
5	DF	ENG	Lucy Roberts
6	MF	ISL	Alexandra Jóhannsdóttir
7	MF	ISL	Katla Tryggvadóttir
8	DF	SWE	Alice Nilsson (captain)
9	FW	AUS	Remy Siemsen
10	MF	FIN	Emmi Alanen
11	FW	SWE	Beata Olsson
12	MF	FIN	Annika Huhta

No.	Pos.	Nation	Player
13	DF	SRB	Emma Petrović
14	DF	SWE	Tilda Persson
17	MF	AUS	Amy Sayer
18	MF	SWE	Filippa Andersson Widén
19	FW	SWE	Agnez Pilblad
20	DF	ISL	Guðný Árnadóttir
22	DF	SWE	Emmy Olofsson
25	MF	SWE	Emma Broddheimer
27	DF	SWE	Viktoria Persson
29	FW	SWE	Tilda Sandén
31	GK	SWE	Emmy Thyberg
33	GK	SWE	Moa Olsson

=== Out on loan ===
Note: Flags indicate national team as defined under FIFA eligibility rules; some limited exceptions apply. Players may hold more than one non-FIFA nationality.

No.	Pos.	Nation	Player

=== Former players ===
For details of current and former players, see Category:Kristianstads DFF players.

=== Staff ===
==== Sports ====
Head coach:

- (Sweden) Daniel Angergård
- (Sweden) Johanna Almgren

Assistant coach:

- (Sweden) Sandra Wuopio

Goalkeeper coach:

- (Serbia) Bojan Jovic

Physiotherapist:

- (Sweden) Frida Berlin

Team leader:

- (Sweden) Isabella Sjöstedt

==== Management ====
Club Manager:

- (Iceland) Albert Sigurdsson

Sports Director:

- (Sweden) Lovisa Ström
