= Football at the 2020 Summer Olympics – Women's tournament final =

2020 Summer Olympic women's football final
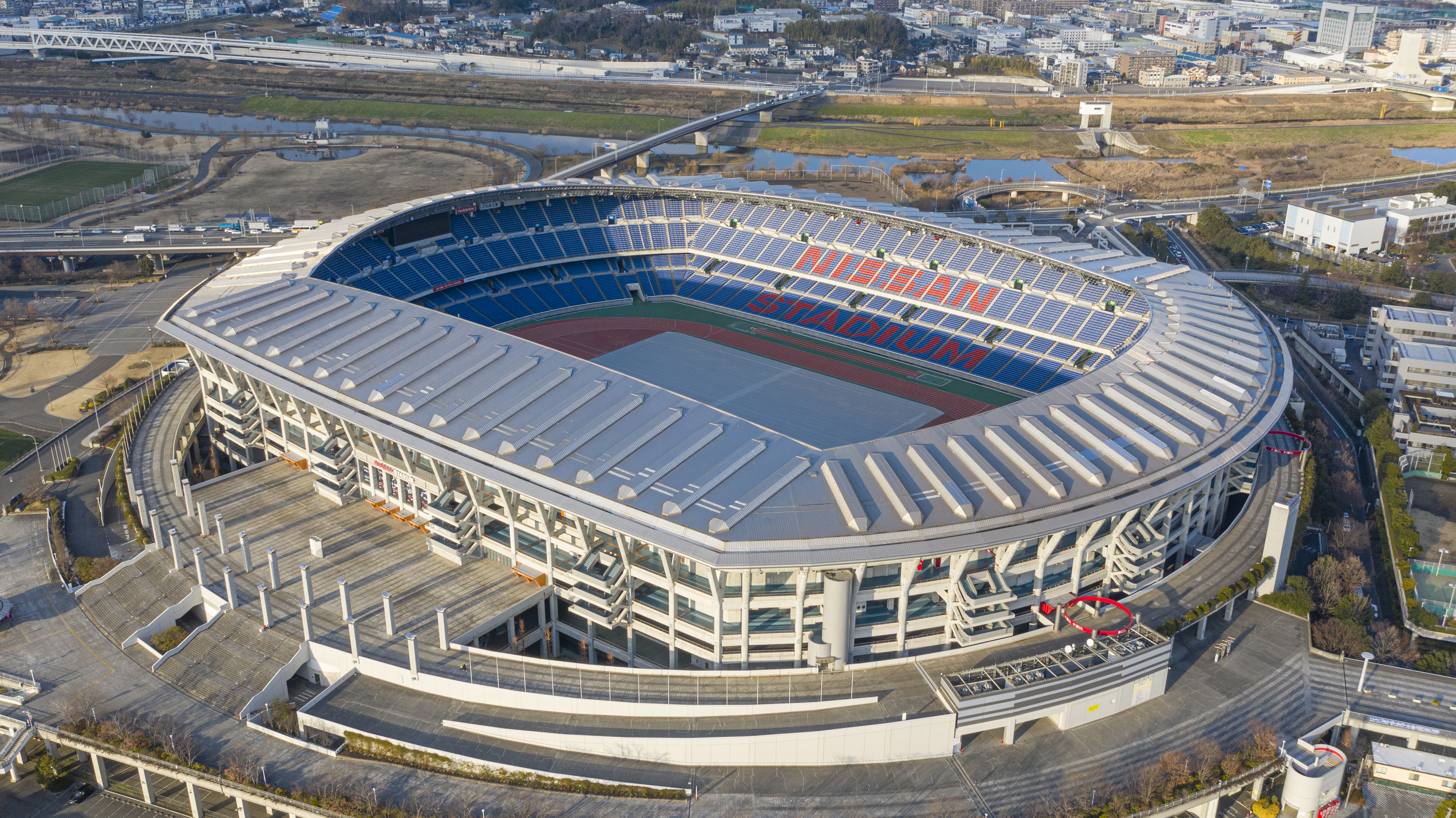
- International Stadium Yokohama in Yokohama
- Event: Football at the 2020 Summer Olympics – Women's tournament
Sweden	Canada
(Sweden)	(Canada)
1	1
- After extra time Canada won 3–2 on penalties
- Date: 6 August 2021
- Venue: International Stadium Yokohama, Yokohama
- Referee: Anastasia Pustovoitova (Russia)

The 2020 Summer Olympic women's football final was a football match that took place at International Stadium Yokohama in Yokohama, Japan, on 6 August 2021 to determine the winner of women's football tournament at the 2020 Summer Olympics. Canada won their first gold medal by defeating Sweden 3–2 in the penalty shoot-out after both teams drew 1–1 after extra time in the final.

== Venue ==
The final was originally scheduled to be held at the Japan National Stadium in Tokyo at 11:00 local time. Both teams requested a later kickoff time due to concerns about excessive heat; as the National Stadium was already booked for athletics events in the evening, the game was moved to 21:00 local time at the International Stadium Yokohama in Yokohama.

== Route to the final ==
=== Sweden ===
Sweden's route to the final
Match	Opponent	Result
1	United States	3–0
2	Australia	4–2
3	New Zealand	2–0
QF	Japan	3–1
SF	Australia	1–0

Sweden qualified for the tournament by placing top-three of European teams at the 2019 FIFA Women's World Cup. In the finals tournament in Japan, they were drawn into Group G alongside the United States, Australia, and New Zealand.

=== Canada ===
Canada's route to the final
Match	Opponent	Result
1	Japan	1–1
2	Chile	2–1
3	Great Britain	1–1
QF	Brazil	0–0 (a.e.t.) (4–3 p)
SF	United States	1–0

Canada qualified for the tournament by advancing to the final of the qualifying tournament. For the finals tournament, they were drawn into Group E alongside Japan, Great Britain and Chile. Canada opened their tournament vs Japan at Sapporo Dome in Sapporo, a 1–1 draw with Christine Sinclair providing the goal in the 6th minute.

== Match ==
=== Details ===
6 August 2021
21:00

Sweden	1–1 (a.e.t.)	Canada
Blackstenius 34'	Report (TOCOG); Report (FIFA)	Fleming 68' (pen.)
Penalties
Asllani (penalty missed); Björn (penalty scored); Schough (penalty scored); Anvegård (penalty missed); Seger (penalty missed); Andersson (penalty missed)	2–3	(penalty scored) Fleming; (penalty missed) Lawrence; (penalty missed) Gilles; (penalty missed) Leon; (penalty scored) Rose; (penalty scored) Grosso

International Stadium Yokohama, Yokohama
Referee: Anastasia Pustovoitova (Russia)

Sweden	Canada

GK	1	Hedvig Lindahl
RB	4	Hanna Glas
CB	13	Amanda Ilestedt		(substituted off) 120'
CB	14	Nathalie Björn
LB	6	Magdalena Eriksson		(substituted off) 75'
CM	16	Filippa Angeldal		(substituted off) 75'
CM	17	Caroline Seger (c)
RW	10	Sofia Jakobsson		(substituted off) 75'
AM	9	Kosovare Asllani	(yellow card) 104'
LW	18	Fridolina Rolfö		(substituted off) 106'
CF	11	Stina Blackstenius		(substituted off) 106'
Substitutions:
DF	2	Jonna Andersson		(substituted on) 75'
MF	5	Hanna Bennison		(substituted on) 75'
FW	8	Lina Hurtig		(substituted on) 75'
FW	19	Anna Anvegård		(substituted on) 106'
MF	15	Olivia Schough		(substituted on) 106'
DF	3	Emma Kullberg		(substituted on) 120'
Manager:
Peter Gerhardsson

GK	1	Stephanie Labbé
RB	10	Ashley Lawrence
CB	14	Vanessa Gilles
CB	3	Kadeisha Buchanan
LB	2	Allysha Chapman		(substituted off) 93'
DM	11	Desiree Scott		(substituted off) 120+2'
CM	17	Jessie Fleming
CM	5	Quinn		(substituted off) 46'
AM	12	Christine Sinclair (c)		(substituted off) 86'
CF	16	Janine Beckie	(yellow card) 27'	(substituted off) 46'
CF	15	Nichelle Prince		(substituted off) 63'
Substitutions:
MF	7	Julia Grosso		(substituted on) 46'
FW	9	Adriana Leon		(substituted on) 46'
FW	6	Deanne Rose		(substituted on) 63'
FW	19	Jordyn Huitema		(substituted on) 86'
DF	8	Jayde Riviere		(substituted on) 93'
DF	4	Shelina Zadorsky		(substituted on) 120+2'
Manager:
(United Kingdom) Bev Priestman

Assistant referees:
Ekaterina Kurochkina (Russia)
Sanja Rodak (Croatia)
Fourth official:
Salima Mukansanga (Rwanda)
Reserve assistant referee:
Kim Kyong-min (South Korea)
Video assistant referee:
Bibiana Steinhaus (Germany)
Assistant video assistant referee:
Marco Guida (Italy)

=== Statistics ===
Overall
Statistic	Sweden	Canada
Goals scored	1	1
Total shots	24	14
Shots on target	3	3
Saves	2	2
Ball possession	54%	46%
Corner kicks	14	5
Fouls committed	12	9
Offsides	1	0
Yellow cards	1	1
Red cards	0	0

== Viewership ==
Despite taking place early in the morning in Canada, the game was viewed by 4.4 million Canadians on CBC Television, making it the most watched event of the games in Canada.
