= Football at the 2020 Summer Olympics – Women's tournament – Group G =

Football at the Olympics

Group G of the women's football tournament at the 2020 Summer Olympics was played from 21 to 27 July 2021 and included Australia, New Zealand, Sweden and the United States. The top two teams, Sweden and the United States, advanced to the knockout stage, along with third-placed Australia as one of the two best third-placed teams among all three groups.

== Teams ==
| Draw position | Team | Pot | Confederation | Method of qualification | Date of qualification | Olympic appearance | Last appearance | Previous best performance | FIFA Rankings | |
| Draw position | Team | Pot | Confederation | Method of qualification | Date of qualification | Olympic appearance | Last appearance | Previous best performance | April 2021 (Note: The rankings of April 2021 were used for seeding for the final draw.) | June 2021 |
|---|---|---|---|---|---|---|---|---|---|---|
| G1 | Sweden | 2 | UEFA | 2019 FIFA Women's World Cup 2nd place European team | 29 June 2019 | 7th | 2016 | Silver medalists (2016) | 5 | 5 |
| G2 | United States | 1 | CONCACAF | 2020 CONCACAF Women's Olympic Qualifying Championship 1st place | 7 February 2020 | 7th | 2016 | Gold medalists (1996, 2004, 2008, 2012) | 1 | 1 |
| G3 | Australia | 3 | AFC | 2020 AFC Women's Olympic Qualifying Tournament play-off round winners | 11 March 2020 | 4th | 2016 | Quarter-finals (2004, 2016) | 9 | 9 |
| G4 | New Zealand | 4 | OFC | 2018 OFC Women's Nations Cup winners | 1 December 2018 | 4th | 2016 | Quarter-finals (2012) | 22 | 22 |

== Standings ==
| Pos | Team | Pld | W | D | L | GF | GA | GD | Pts | Qualification |
|---|---|---|---|---|---|---|---|---|---|---|
| 1 | Sweden | 3 | 3 | 0 | 0 | 9 | 2 | +7 | 9 | Advance to knockout stage |
| 2 | United States | 3 | 1 | 1 | 1 | 6 | 4 | +2 | 4 | Advance to knockout stage |
| 3 | Australia | 3 | 1 | 1 | 1 | 4 | 5 | −1 | 4 | Advance to knockout stage |
| 4 | New Zealand | 3 | 0 | 0 | 3 | 2 | 10 | −8 | 0 | |

Source: TOCOG and FIFA
Rules for classification: Group stage tiebreakers

In the quarter-finals,

- The winner of Group G, Sweden, advanced to play the third-placed team of Group E, Japan.
- The runner-up of Group G, the United States, advanced to play the winner of Group F, the Netherlands.
- The third-placed team of Group G, Australia, advanced as one of the two best third-placed teams to play the winner of Group E, Great Britain.

== Matches ==
=== Sweden vs United States ===
21 July 2021
17:30

| Sweden | 3–0 | United States |
|---|---|---|
| Blackstenius 25', 54'; Hurtig 72' | Report (TOCOG); Report (FIFA) |

Tokyo Stadium, Chōfu
Attendance: 0
Referee: Yoshimi Yamashita (Japan)

| Sweden | United States |

| GK | 1 | Hedvig Lindahl |
| RB | 4 | Hanna Glas |
| CB | 13 | Amanda Ilestedt |
| CB | 14 | Nathalie Björn |
| LB | 2 | Jonna Andersson | (substituted off) 88' |
| CM | 16 | Filippa Angeldal | (substituted off) 75' |
| CM | 9 | Kosovare Asllani |
| CM | 17 | Caroline Seger (c) |
| RF | 10 | Sofia Jakobsson | (substituted off) 75' |
| CF | 11 | Stina Blackstenius | (substituted off) 64' |
| LF | 18 | Fridolina Rolfö | (substituted off) 63' |
Substitutions:
| MF | 15 | Olivia Schough | (substituted on) 63' |
| FW | 8 | Lina Hurtig | (substituted on) 64' |
| FW | 7 | Madelen Janogy | (substituted on) 75' |
| MF | 5 | Hanna Bennison | (substituted on) 75' |
| MF | 20 | Julia Roddar | (substituted on) 88' |
Manager:
Peter Gerhardsson

| GK | 1 | Alyssa Naeher |
| RB | 5 | Kelley O'Hara |
| CB | 17 | Abby Dahlkemper |
| CB | 4 | Becky Sauerbrunn (c) |
| LB | 2 | Crystal Dunn | (substituted off) 81' |
| CM | 16 | Rose Lavelle | (substituted off) 80' |
| CM | 9 | Lindsey Horan |
| CM | 3 | Sam Mewis | (substituted off) 46' |
| RF | 11 | Christen Press |
| CF | 13 | Alex Morgan | (substituted off) 46' |
| LF | 7 | Tobin Heath | (substituted off) 64' |
Substitutions:
| MF | 8 | Julie Ertz | (substituted on) 46' |
| FW | 10 | Carli Lloyd | (substituted on) 46' |
| FW | 15 | Megan Rapinoe | (substituted on) 64' |
| MF | 6 | Kristie Mewis | (substituted on) 80' |
| DF | 12 | Tierna Davidson | (substituted on) 81' |
Manager:
(North Macedonia) Vlatko Andonovski

Assistant referees:
Naomi Teshirogi (Japan)
Makoto Bozono (Japan)
Fourth official:
Anastasia Pustovoitova (Russia)
Video assistant referee:
Paweł Raczkowski (Poland)
Assistant video assistant referee:
Fu Ming (China PR)

=== Australia vs New Zealand ===
21 July 2021
20:30

| Australia | 2–1 | New Zealand |
|---|---|---|
| Yallop 20'; Kerr 33' | Report (TOCOG); Report (FIFA) | Rennie 90+1' |

Tokyo Stadium, Chōfu
Attendance: 0
Referee: Lucila Venegas (Mexico)

| Australia | New Zealand |

| GK | 1 | Lydia Williams |
| CB | 12 | Ellie Carpenter |
| CB | 4 | Clare Polkinghorne |
| CB | 7 | Steph Catley |
| RM | 16 | Hayley Raso | (substituted off) 83' |
| CM | 10 | Emily van Egmond |
| CM | 5 | Aivi Luik |
| LM | 13 | Tameka Yallop | (substituted off) 75' |
| RF | 17 | Kyah Simon | (substituted off) 75' |
| CF | 2 | Sam Kerr (c) |
| LF | 9 | Caitlin Foord | (substituted off) 90+1' |
Substitutions:
| MF | 11 | Mary Fowler | (substituted on) 75' |
| MF | 3 | Kyra Cooney-Cross | (substituted on) 75' |
| DF | 14 | Alanna Kennedy | (substituted on) 83' |
| FW | 15 | Emily Gielnik | (substituted on) 90+1' |
Manager:
(Sweden) Tony Gustavsson

| GK | 1 | Erin Nayler |
| CB | 3 | Anna Green | | (substituted off) 69' |
| CB | 8 | Abby Erceg |
| CB | 5 | Meikayla Moore |
| RM | 4 | C. J. Bott | (yellow card) 71' | (substituted off) 89' |
| CM | 14 | Katie Bowen | (yellow card) 81' |
| CM | 2 | Ria Percival |
| LM | 7 | Ali Riley (c) |
| RF | 12 | Betsy Hassett |
| CF | 17 | Hannah Wilkinson |
| LF | 11 | Olivia Chance | | (substituted off) 68' |
Substitutions:
| MF | 15 | Daisy Cleverley | | (substituted on) 68' |
| FW | 13 | Paige Satchell | | (substituted on) 69' |
| FW | 9 | Gabi Rennie | | (substituted on) 89' |
Manager:
(United Kingdom) Tom Sermanni

Assistant referees:
Mayte Chávez (Mexico)
Enedina Caudillo (Mexico)
Fourth official:
Melissa Borjas (Honduras)
Video assistant referee:
Andrés Cunha (Uruguay)
Assistant video assistant referee:
Erick Miranda (Mexico)

=== Sweden vs Australia ===
24 July 2021
17:30

| Sweden | 4–2 | Australia |
|---|---|---|
| Rolfö 20', 63'; Hurtig 52'; Blackstenius 82' | Report (TOCOG); Report (FIFA) | Kerr 36', 48' |

Saitama Stadium 2002, Saitama
Attendance: 0
Referee: Edina Alves Batista (Brazil)

| Sweden | Australia |

| GK | 1 | Hedvig Lindahl |
| RB | 4 | Hanna Glas | (substituted off) 46' |
| CB | 13 | Amanda Ilestedt |
| CB | 6 | Magdalena Eriksson |
| LB | 2 | Jonna Andersson |
| CM | 16 | Filippa Angeldal | (substituted off) 79' |
| CM | 17 | Caroline Seger (c) |
| RW | 10 | Sofia Jakobsson | (substituted off) 79' |
| AM | 9 | Kosovare Asllani |
| LW | 18 | Fridolina Rolfö | (substituted off) 87' |
| CF | 8 | Lina Hurtig | (substituted off) 59' |
Substitutions:
| DF | 14 | Nathalie Björn | (substituted on) 46' |
| FW | 11 | Stina Blackstenius | (substituted on) 59' |
| MF | 15 | Olivia Schough | (substituted on) 79' |
| MF | 5 | Hanna Bennison | (substituted on) 79' |
| FW | 7 | Madelen Janogy | (substituted on) 87' |
Manager:
Peter Gerhardsson

| GK | 18 | Teagan Micah |
| CB | 12 | Ellie Carpenter |
| CB | 4 | Clare Polkinghorne |
| CB | 5 | Aivi Luik | (substituted off) 64' |
| RM | 16 | Hayley Raso | (substituted off) 80' |
| CM | 10 | Emily van Egmond |
| CM | 13 | Tameka Yallop | (substituted off) 64' |
| LM | 7 | Steph Catley |
| RF | 17 | Kyah Simon | (substituted off) 87' |
| CF | 2 | Sam Kerr (c) |
| LF | 9 | Caitlin Foord |
Substitutions:
| DF | 14 | Alanna Kennedy | (substituted on) 64' |
| MF | 3 | Kyra Cooney-Cross | (substituted on) 64' |
| MF | 11 | Mary Fowler | (substituted on) 80' |
| FW | 15 | Emily Gielnik | (substituted on) 87' |
Manager:
(Sweden) Tony Gustavsson

Assistant referees:
Neuza Back (Brazil)
Mónica Amboya (Ecuador)
Fourth official:
Salima Mukansanga (Rwanda)
Video assistant referee:
Tiago Martins (Portugal)
Assistant video assistant referee:
Mahmoud Mohamed Ashour (Egypt)

=== New Zealand vs United States ===
24 July 2021
20:30

| New Zealand | 1–6 | United States |
|---|---|---|
| Hassett 72' | Report (TOCOG); Report (FIFA) | Lavelle 9'; Horan 45'; Erceg 63' (o.g.); Press 80'; Morgan 88'; Bott 90+3' (o.g.) |

Saitama Stadium 2002, Saitama
Attendance: 0
Referee: Stéphanie Frappart (France)

| New Zealand | United States |

| GK | 18 | Anna Leat |
| RB | 4 | C. J. Bott |
| CB | 5 | Meikayla Moore |
| CB | 8 | Abby Erceg |
| LB | 15 | Daisy Cleverley | (substituted off) 80' |
| RM | 12 | Betsy Hassett | (substituted off) 87' |
| CM | 2 | Ria Percival |
| CM | 14 | Katie Bowen |
| LM | 7 | Ali Riley (c) |
| CF | 17 | Hannah Wilkinson |
| CF | 11 | Olivia Chance | (substituted off) 65' |
Substitutions:
| FW | 13 | Paige Satchell | (substituted on) 65' |
| FW | 9 | Gabi Rennie | (substituted on) 80' |
| MF | 10 | Annalie Longo | (substituted on) 87' |
Manager:
(United Kingdom) Tom Sermanni

| GK | 1 | Alyssa Naeher |
| RB | 14 | Emily Sonnett |
| CB | 17 | Abby Dahlkemper |
| CB | 12 | Tierna Davidson |
| LB | 2 | Crystal Dunn | (substituted off) 84' |
| CM | 16 | Rose Lavelle | (substituted off) 68' |
| CM | 8 | Julie Ertz |
| CM | 9 | Lindsey Horan | (substituted off) 84' |
| RF | 7 | Tobin Heath |
| CF | 10 | Carli Lloyd | (substituted off) 74' |
| LF | 15 | Megan Rapinoe (c) | (substituted off) 68' |
Substitutions:
| MF | 3 | Sam Mewis | (substituted on) 68' |
| FW | 11 | Christen Press | (substituted on) 68' |
| FW | 13 | Alex Morgan | (substituted on) 74' |
| MF | 19 | Catarina Macario | (substituted on) 84' |
| DF | 20 | Casey Krueger | (substituted on) 84' |
Manager:
(North Macedonia) Vlatko Andonovski

Assistant referees:
Manuela Nicolosi (France)
Michelle O'Neill (Republic of Ireland)
Fourth official:
Laura Fortunato (Argentina)
Video assistant referee:
Marco Guida (Italy)
Assistant video assistant referee:
Adil Zourak (Morocco)

=== New Zealand vs Sweden ===
27 July 2021
17:00

| New Zealand | 0–2 | Sweden |
|---|---|---|
| | Report (TOCOG); Report (FIFA) | Anvegård 17'; Janogy 29' |

Miyagi Stadium, Rifu
Attendance: 884
Referee: Laura Fortunato (Argentina)

| New Zealand | Sweden |

| GK | 1 | Erin Nayler |
| RB | 4 | C. J. Bott |
| CB | 5 | Meikayla Moore |
| CB | 8 | Abby Erceg |
| LB | 7 | Ali Riley (c) |
| CM | 15 | Daisy Cleverley | | (substituted off) 88' |
| CM | 2 | Ria Percival | (yellow card) 67' |
| RW | 12 | Betsy Hassett |
| AM | 14 | Katie Bowen |
| LW | 16 | Emma Rolston | | (substituted off) 60' |
| CF | 17 | Hannah Wilkinson | | (substituted off) 85' |
Substitutions:
| FW | 13 | Paige Satchell | | (substituted on) 60' |
| FW | 9 | Gabi Rennie | | (substituted on) 85' |
| DF | 6 | Claudia Bunge | | (substituted on) 88' |
Manager:
(United Kingdom) Tom Sermanni

| GK | 12 | Jennifer Falk |
| RB | 20 | Julia Roddar |
| CB | 3 | Emma Kullberg |
| CB | 6 | Magdalena Eriksson (c) | (substituted off) 46' |
| LB | 2 | Jonna Andersson | (substituted off) 46' |
| RM | 7 | Madelen Janogy |
| CM | 16 | Filippa Angeldal | (substituted off) 72' |
| CM | 5 | Hanna Bennison |
| LM | 15 | Olivia Schough | (substituted off) 65' |
| CF | 19 | Anna Anvegård | (substituted off) 86' |
| CF | 21 | Rebecka Blomqvist |
Substitutions:
| DF | 14 | Nathalie Björn | (substituted on) 46' |
| DF | 13 | Amanda Ilestedt | (substituted on) 46' |
| FW | 8 | Lina Hurtig | (substituted on) 65' |
| MF | 17 | Caroline Seger | (substituted on) 72' |
| FW | 9 | Kosovare Asllani | (substituted on) 86' |
Manager:
Peter Gerhardsson

Assistant referees:
Mariana De Almeida (Argentina)
Chantal Boudreau (Canada)
Fourth official:
Lucila Venegas (Mexico)
Video assistant referee:
Mauro Vigliano (Argentina)
Assistant video assistant referee:
Guillermo Cuadra Fernández (Spain)

=== United States vs Australia ===
27 July 2021
17:00

| United States | 0–0 | Australia |
|---|---|---|
| | Report (TOCOG); Report (FIFA) |

Kashima Stadium, Kashima
Attendance: 0
Referee: Anastasia Pustovoitova (Russia)

| United States | Australia |

| GK | 1 | Alyssa Naeher |
| RB | 5 | Kelley O'Hara |
| CB | 4 | Becky Sauerbrunn (c) |
| CB | 12 | Tierna Davidson |
| LB | 2 | Crystal Dunn |
| CM | 16 | Rose Lavelle | (yellow card) 72' | (substituted off) 88' |
| CM | 8 | Julie Ertz |
| CM | 3 | Sam Mewis | | (substituted off) 65' |
| RF | 11 | Christen Press | | (substituted off) 74' |
| CF | 13 | Alex Morgan | | (substituted off) 74' |
| LF | 15 | Megan Rapinoe | (yellow card) 38' | (substituted off) 65' |
Substitutions:
| MF | 9 | Lindsey Horan | | (substituted on) 65' |
| FW | 7 | Tobin Heath | | (substituted on) 65' |
| FW | 10 | Carli Lloyd | | (substituted on) 74' |
| FW | 21 | Lynn Williams | | (substituted on) 74' |
| MF | 6 | Kristie Mewis | | (substituted on) 88' |
Manager:
(North Macedonia) Vlatko Andonovski

| GK | 18 | Teagan Micah |
| CB | 12 | Ellie Carpenter |
| CB | 14 | Alanna Kennedy |
| CB | 4 | Clare Polkinghorne |
| RM | 17 | Kyah Simon | | (substituted off) 84' |
| CM | 10 | Emily van Egmond |
| CM | 13 | Tameka Yallop |
| LM | 7 | Steph Catley |
| RF | 11 | Mary Fowler |
| CF | 2 | Sam Kerr (c) |
| LF | 6 | Chloe Logarzo | | (substituted off) 62' |
Substitutions:
| MF | 3 | Kyra Cooney-Cross | (yellow card) 69' | (substituted on) 62' |
| FW | 15 | Emily Gielnik | | (substituted on) 84' |
Manager:
(Sweden) Tony Gustavsson

Assistant referees:
Ekaterina Kurochkina (Russia)
Sanja Rodak (Croatia)
Fourth official:
Esther Staubli (Switzerland)
Video assistant referee:
Adil Zourak (Morocco)
Assistant video assistant referee:
Bibiana Steinhaus (Germany)

== Discipline ==
Fair play points would have been used as a tiebreaker if the overall and head-to-head records of teams were tied. These were calculated based on yellow and red cards received in all group matches as follows:

- first yellow card: minus 1 point;
- indirect red card (second yellow card): minus 3 points;
- direct red card: minus 4 points;
- yellow card and direct red card: minus 5 points;

Only one of the above deductions could be applied to a player in a single match.

| Team | Match 1 | | | | Match 2 | | | | Match 3 | | | | Points |
| Team | Booked | (yellow card) (yellow-red card) | Sent off (straight red) | (yellow card) (red card) | Booked | (yellow card) (yellow-red card) | Sent off (straight red) | (yellow card) (red card) | Booked | (yellow card) (yellow-red card) | Sent off (straight red) | (yellow card) (red card) | Points |
|---|---|---|---|---|---|---|---|---|---|---|---|---|---|
| Sweden | | | | | | | | | | | | | 0 |
| Australia | | | | | | | | | 1 | | | | −1 |
| United States | | | | | | | | | 2 | | | | −2 |
| New Zealand | 2 | | | | | | | | 1 | | | | −3 |
