= Football at the 2020 Summer Olympics – Women's tournament – Knockout stage =

Football at the Olympics

The knockout stage of the women's football tournament at the 2020 Summer Olympics was played from 30 July to 6 August 2021. The top two teams from each group in the group stage, as well as the two best third-placed teams, qualified for the knockout stage.

All times listed are Japan Standard Time (UTC+9).

== Format ==
In the knockout stage, if a match was level at the end of 90 minutes of normal playing time, extra time was played (two periods of 15 minutes each) and followed, if necessary, by a penalty shoot-out to determine the winner.

=== Combinations of matches in the quarter-finals ===
The specific match-ups involving the third-placed teams depended on which two third-placed teams qualified for the quarter-finals:

Combination according to the two qualified teams

Third-placed teams qualify from groups			1E vs	1G vs
E	F		3F	3E
E		G	3G	3E
	F	G	3G	3F

== Qualified teams ==
The top two placed teams from each of the three groups, along with the two best-placed third teams, qualified for the knockout stage.

Group	Winners	Runners-up	Third-placed teams (Best two qualify)
E	Great Britain	Canada	Japan
F	Netherlands	Brazil	—N/a
G	Sweden	United States	Australia

== Bracket ==
Quarter-finals
30 July – Kashima
Great Britain	3
Australia (a.e.t.)	4
30 July – Saitama
Sweden	3
Japan	1
30 July – Yokohama
Netherlands	2 (2)
United States (p)	2 (4)
30 July – Rifu
Canada (p)	0 (4)
Brazil	0 (3)

Semi-finals
2 August – Yokohama
Australia	0
Sweden	1
2 August – Kashima
United States	0
Canada	1

Gold medal match
6 August – Yokohama
Sweden	1 (2)
Canada (p)	1 (3)
Bronze medal match
5 August – Kashima
Australia	3
United States	4

== Quarter-finals ==
=== Canada vs Brazil ===
30 July 2021
17:00

Canada	0–0 (a.e.t.)	Brazil
	Report (TOCOG); Report (FIFA)
Penalties
Sinclair (penalty missed); Fleming (penalty scored); Lawrence (penalty scored); Leon (penalty scored); Gilles (penalty scored)	4–3	(penalty scored) Marta; (penalty scored) Debinha; (penalty scored) Érika; (penalty missed) Andressa; (penalty missed) Rafaelle

Miyagi Stadium, Rifu
Attendance: 3,403
Referee: Stéphanie Frappart (France)

Canada	Brazil

GK	1	Stephanie Labbé
RB	10	Ashley Lawrence	(yellow card) 90+1'
CB	14	Vanessa Gilles
CB	3	Kadeisha Buchanan
LB	2	Allysha Chapman		(substituted off) 109'
DM	11	Desiree Scott
CM	17	Jessie Fleming
CM	5	Quinn		(substituted off) 63'
AM	12	Christine Sinclair (c)
CF	16	Janine Beckie		(substituted off) 105+2'
CF	15	Nichelle Prince		(substituted off) 63'
Substitutions:
FW	6	Deanne Rose		(substituted on) 63'	(substituted off) 114'
MF	7	Julia Grosso		(substituted on) 63'
FW	9	Adriana Leon		(substituted on) 105+2'
DF	8	Jayde Riviere	(yellow card) 117'	(substituted on) 109'
FW	19	Jordyn Huitema			(substituted on) 114'
Manager:
(United Kingdom) Bev Priestman

GK	1	Bárbara
RB	13	Bruna
CB	3	Érika
CB	4	Rafaelle
LB	6	Tamires
RM	7	Duda	(yellow card) 59'	(substituted off) 102'
CM	8	Formiga		(substituted off) 73'
CM	17	Andressinha
LM	10	Marta (c)
CF	16	Beatriz		(substituted off) 59'
CF	9	Debinha
Substitutions:
FW	12	Ludmila	(yellow card) 101'	(substituted on) 59'
MF	11	Angelina		(substituted on) 73'
FW	21	Andressa		(substituted on) 102'
Manager:
(Sweden) Pia Sundhage

Assistant referees:
Manuela Nicolosi (France)
Michelle O'Neill (Republic of Ireland)
Fourth official:
Esther Staubli (Switzerland)
Video assistant referee:
Bibiana Steinhaus (Germany)
Assistant video assistant referee:
Abdulkadir Bitigen (Turkey)

=== Great Britain vs Australia ===
30 July 2021
18:00

Great Britain	3–4 (a.e.t.)	Australia
White 57', 66', 115'	Report (TOCOG); Report (FIFA)	Kennedy 35'; Kerr 89', 106'; Fowler 103'

Kashima Stadium, Kashima
Attendance: 0
Referee: Salima Mukansanga (Rwanda)

Great Britain	Australia

GK	1	Ellie Roebuck
RB	2	Lucy Bronze	(yellow card) 44'	(substituted off) 112'
CB	5	Steph Houghton (c)
CB	16	Leah Williamson
LB	3	Demi Stokes		(substituted off) 58'
CM	4	Keira Walsh		(substituted off) 97'
CM	11	Caroline Weir
RW	12	Rachel Daly		(substituted off) 58'
AM	8	Kim Little		(substituted off) 80'
LW	15	Lauren Hemp		(substituted off) 96'
CF	9	Ellen White
Substitutions:
DF	14	Millie Bright		(substituted on) 58'
FW	10	Fran Kirby		(substituted on) 58'
MF	18	Jill Scott		(substituted on) 80'
FW	7	Nikita Parris		(substituted on) 96'
MF	6	Sophie Ingle		(substituted on) 97'
MF	17	Georgia Stanway	(yellow card) 120+1'	(substituted on) 112'
Manager:
(Norway) Hege Riise

GK	18	Teagan Micah
CB	12	Ellie Carpenter
CB	14	Alanna Kennedy
CB	5	Aivi Luik		(substituted off) 80'
RM	16	Hayley Raso		(substituted off) 88'
CM	10	Emily van Egmond
CM	13	Tameka Yallop
LM	7	Steph Catley
RF	17	Kyah Simon	(yellow card) 71'	(substituted off) 80'
CF	2	Sam Kerr (c)	(yellow card) 26'
LF	9	Caitlin Foord		(substituted off) 80'
Substitutions:
MF	3	Kyra Cooney-Cross		(substituted on) 80'	(substituted off) 108'
FW	11	Mary Fowler		(substituted on) 80'
FW	15	Emily Gielnik		(substituted on) 80'
MF	6	Chloe Logarzo		(substituted on) 88'
DF	4	Clare Polkinghorne			(substituted on) 108'
Manager:
(Sweden) Tony Gustavsson

Assistant referees:
Bernadettar Kwimbira (Malawi)
Mary Njorge (Kenya)
Fourth official:
Edina Alves Batista (Brazil)
Video assistant referee:
Benoît Millot (France)
Assistant video assistant referee:
Fu Ming (China PR)

=== Sweden vs Japan ===
30 July 2021
19:00

Sweden	3–1	Japan
Eriksson 7'; Blackstenius 53'; Asllani 68' (pen.)	Report (TOCOG); Report (FIFA)	Tanaka 23'

Saitama Stadium 2002, Saitama
Attendance: 0
Referee: Lucila Venegas (Mexico)

Sweden	Japan

GK	1	Hedvig Lindahl
RB	4	Hanna Glas
CB	13	Amanda Ilestedt	(yellow card) 29'
CB	14	Nathalie Björn
LB	6	Magdalena Eriksson
CM	16	Filippa Angeldal		(substituted off) 62'
CM	17	Caroline Seger (c)
RW	10	Sofia Jakobsson		(substituted off) 90'
AM	9	Kosovare Asllani		(substituted off) 90'
LW	18	Fridolina Rolfö		(substituted off) 75'
CF	11	Stina Blackstenius		(substituted off) 75'
Substitutions:
MF	5	Hanna Bennison		(substituted on) 62'
MF	15	Olivia Schough		(substituted on) 75'
FW	8	Lina Hurtig		(substituted on) 75'
DF	2	Jonna Andersson		(substituted on) 90'
FW	7	Madelen Janogy		(substituted on) 90'
Manager:
Peter Gerhardsson

GK	18	Ayaka Yamashita
RB	2	Risa Shimizu
CB	4	Saki Kumagai (c)
CB	5	Moeka Minami
LB	16	Asato Miyagawa
RM	14	Yui Hasegawa		(substituted off) 82'
CM	7	Emi Nakajima		(substituted off) 86'
CM	8	Narumi Miura		(substituted off) 72'
LM	6	Hina Sugita
CF	10	Mana Iwabuchi	(yellow card) 38'
CF	11	Mina Tanaka
Substitutions:
MF	12	Jun Endo		(substituted on) 72'
DF	17	Nanami Kitamura		(substituted on) 82'
MF	20	Honoka Hayashi		(substituted on) 86'
Manager:
Asako Takakura

Assistant referees:
Mayte Chávez (Mexico)
Enedina Caudillo (Mexico)
Fourth official:
Melissa Borjas (Honduras)
Video assistant referee:
Mauro Vigliano (Argentina)
Assistant video assistant referee:
Andrés Cunha (Uruguay)

=== Netherlands vs United States ===
30 July 2021
20:00

Netherlands	2–2 (a.e.t.)	United States
Miedema 18', 54'	Report (TOCOG); Report (FIFA)	S. Mewis 28'; Williams 31'
Penalties
Miedema (penalty missed); Janssen (penalty scored); Van der Gragt (penalty scored); Nouwen (penalty missed)	2–4	(penalty scored) Lavelle; (penalty scored) Morgan; (penalty scored) Press; (penalty scored) Rapinoe

International Stadium Yokohama, Yokohama
Attendance: 0
Referee: Kate Jacewicz (Australia)

Netherlands	United States

GK	1	Sari van Veenendaal (c)
RB	2	Lynn Wilms
CB	3	Stefanie van der Gragt
CB	4	Aniek Nouwen
LB	17	Dominique Janssen
CM	6	Jill Roord		(substituted off) 97'
CM	14	Jackie Groenen
CM	10	Daniëlle van de Donk	(yellow card) 90+4'
RF	7	Shanice van de Sanden		(substituted off) 63'
CF	9	Vivianne Miedema
LF	11	Lieke Martens
Substitutions:
FW	18	Lineth Beerensteyn		(substituted on) 63'
MF	13	Victoria Pelova		(substituted on) 97'
Manager:
Sarina Wiegman

GK	1	Alyssa Naeher
RB	5	Kelley O'Hara	(yellow card) 115'
CB	17	Abby Dahlkemper
CB	4	Becky Sauerbrunn (c)
LB	2	Crystal Dunn
CM	9	Lindsey Horan	(yellow card) 77'
CM	8	Julie Ertz
CM	3	Sam Mewis		(substituted off) 58'
RF	7	Tobin Heath		(substituted off) 64'
CF	10	Carli Lloyd		(substituted off) 58'
LF	21	Lynn Williams		(substituted off) 57'
Substitutions:
MF	16	Rose Lavelle		(substituted on) 57'
FW	11	Christen Press		(substituted on) 58'
FW	13	Alex Morgan		(substituted on) 58'
FW	15	Megan Rapinoe		(substituted on) 64'
Manager:
(North Macedonia) Vlatko Andonovski

Assistant referees:
Kim Kyong-min (South Korea)
Lee Seul-gi (South Korea)
Fourth official:
Yoshimi Yamashita (Japan)
Video assistant referee:
Abdulla Al-Marri (Qatar)
Assistant video assistant referee:
Muhammad Taqi (Singapore)

== Semi-finals ==
=== United States vs Canada ===
2 August 2021
17:00

United States	0–1	Canada
	Report (TOCOG); Report (FIFA)	Fleming 75' (pen.)

Kashima Stadium, Kashima
Attendance: 0
Referee: Kateryna Monzul (Ukraine)

United States	Canada

GK	1	Alyssa Naeher		(substituted off) 30'
RB	5	Kelley O'Hara	(yellow card) 32'	(substituted off) 80'
CB	4	Becky Sauerbrunn (c)
CB	12	Tierna Davidson
LB	2	Crystal Dunn
CM	16	Rose Lavelle
CM	8	Julie Ertz
CM	9	Lindsey Horan
RF	7	Tobin Heath		(substituted off) 60'
CF	13	Alex Morgan		(substituted off) 61'
LF	21	Lynn Williams		(substituted off) 60'
Substitutions:
GK	18	Adrianna Franch		(substituted on) 30'
FW	11	Christen Press		(substituted on) 60'
FW	15	Megan Rapinoe		(substituted on) 60'
FW	10	Carli Lloyd		(substituted on) 61'
MF	3	Sam Mewis		(substituted on) 80'
Manager:
(North Macedonia) Vlatko Andonovski

GK	1	Stephanie Labbé
RB	10	Ashley Lawrence
CB	14	Vanessa Gilles
CB	3	Kadeisha Buchanan
LB	2	Allysha Chapman
DM	11	Desiree Scott
CM	17	Jessie Fleming
CM	5	Quinn	(substituted off) 60'
AM	12	Christine Sinclair (c)	(substituted off) 87'
CF	16	Janine Beckie
CF	15	Nichelle Prince	(substituted off) 60'
Substitutions:
MF	7	Julia Grosso	(substituted on) 60'
FW	6	Deanne Rose	(substituted on) 60'	(substituted off) 90'
FW	19	Jordyn Huitema	(substituted on) 87'
FW	9	Adriana Leon		(substituted on) 90'
Manager:
(United Kingdom) Bev Priestman

Assistant referees:
Lucie Ratajová (Czech Republic)
Maryna Striletska (Ukraine)
Fourth official:
Stéphanie Frappart (France)
Reserve assistant referee:
Manuela Nicolosi (France)
Video assistant referee:
Paweł Raczkowski (Poland)
Assistant video assistant referee:
Fu Ming (China PR)

=== Australia vs Sweden ===
2 August 2021
20:00

Australia	0–1	Sweden
	Report (TOCOG); Report (FIFA)	Rolfö 46'

International Stadium Yokohama, Yokohama
Attendance: 0
Referee: Melissa Borjas (Honduras)

Australia	Sweden

GK	18	Teagan Micah
CB	12	Ellie Carpenter	(red card) 90+6'
CB	14	Alanna Kennedy
CB	7	Steph Catley
RM	16	Hayley Raso		(substituted off) 84'
CM	10	Emily van Egmond
CM	6	Chloe Logarzo		(substituted off) 69'
LM	13	Tameka Yallop		(substituted off) 69'
RF	17	Kyah Simon		(substituted off) 69'
CF	2	Sam Kerr (c)
LF	9	Caitlin Foord		(substituted off) 90+1'
Substitutions:
DF	4	Clare Polkinghorne		(substituted on) 69'
MF	11	Mary Fowler		(substituted on) 69'
MF	3	Kyra Cooney-Cross		(substituted on) 69'
FW	15	Emily Gielnik		(substituted on) 84'
DF	21	Laura Brock		(substituted on) 90+1'
Manager:
(Sweden) Tony Gustavsson

GK	1	Hedvig Lindahl
RB	4	Hanna Glas
CB	13	Amanda Ilestedt
CB	14	Nathalie Björn
LB	6	Magdalena Eriksson
CM	16	Filippa Angeldal	(substituted off) 73'
CM	17	Caroline Seger (c)
RW	10	Sofia Jakobsson	(substituted off) 90+1'
AM	9	Kosovare Asllani
LW	18	Fridolina Rolfö
CF	11	Stina Blackstenius	(substituted off) 90+4'
Substitutions:
MF	5	Hanna Bennison	(substituted on) 73'
DF	2	Jonna Andersson	(substituted on) 90+1'
FW	8	Lina Hurtig	(substituted on) 90+4'
Manager:
Peter Gerhardsson

Assistant referees:
Shirley Perello (Honduras)
Enedina Caudillo (Mexico)
Fourth official:
Salima Mukansanga (Rwanda)
Reserve assistant referee:
Mariana De Almeida (Argentina)
Video assistant referee:
Nicolás Gallo (Colombia)
Assistant video assistant referee:
Erick Miranda (Mexico)

== Bronze medal match ==
5 August 2021
17:00

Australia	3–4	United States
Kerr 17'; Foord 54'; Gielnik 90'	Report (TOCOG); Report (FIFA)	Rapinoe 8', 21'; Lloyd 45+1', 51'

Kashima Stadium, Kashima
Attendance: 0
Referee: Laura Fortunato (Argentina)

Australia	United States

GK	18	Teagan Micah
CB	14	Alanna Kennedy
CB	4	Clare Polkinghorne	(substituted off) 74'
CB	7	Steph Catley
RM	16	Hayley Raso	(substituted off) 67'
CM	10	Emily van Egmond
CM	6	Chloe Logarzo	(substituted off) 67'
LM	13	Tameka Yallop	(substituted off) 87'
RF	17	Kyah Simon	(substituted off) 67'
CF	2	Sam Kerr (c)
LF	9	Caitlin Foord
Substitutions:
FW	11	Mary Fowler	(substituted on) 67'
MF	3	Kyra Cooney-Cross	(substituted on) 67'
DF	19	Courtney Nevin	(substituted on) 67'
FW	15	Emily Gielnik	(substituted on) 74'
DF	21	Laura Brock	(substituted on) 87'
Manager:
(Sweden) Tony Gustavsson

GK	18	Adrianna Franch
RB	5	Kelley O'Hara
CB	4	Becky Sauerbrunn (c)
CB	12	Tierna Davidson
LB	2	Crystal Dunn
CM	3	Sam Mewis	(substituted off) 61'
CM	8	Julie Ertz
CM	9	Lindsey Horan
RF	11	Christen Press	(substituted off) 85'
CF	10	Carli Lloyd	(substituted off) 81'
LF	15	Megan Rapinoe	(substituted off) 60'
Substitutions:
FW	7	Tobin Heath	(substituted on) 60'
MF	16	Rose Lavelle	(substituted on) 61'
FW	13	Alex Morgan	(substituted on) 81'
DF	14	Emily Sonnett	(substituted on) 85'
Manager:
(North Macedonia) Vlatko Andonovski

Assistant referees:
Mariana De Almeida (Argentina)
Mary Blanco (Colombia)
Fourth official:
Stéphanie Frappart (France)
Reserve assistant referee:
Bernadettar Kwimbira (Malawi)
Video assistant referee:
Mauro Vigliano (Argentina)
Assistant video assistant referee:
Andrés Cunha (Uruguay)

== Gold medal match ==
The gold medal match was originally scheduled to be held on 6 August 2021, 11:00, at Japan National Stadium, Tokyo. Both teams requested a later kick-off time due to concerns about excessive heat; as the National Stadium was already booked for athletics events in the evening, the game was moved to 21:00 on the same day at the International Stadium Yokohama in Yokohama.

6 August 2021
21:00

Sweden	1–1 (a.e.t.)	Canada
Blackstenius 34'	Report (TOCOG); Report (FIFA)	Fleming 68' (pen.)
Penalties
Asllani (penalty missed); Björn (penalty scored); Schough (penalty scored); Anvegård (penalty missed); Seger (penalty missed); Andersson (penalty missed)	2–3	(penalty scored) Fleming; (penalty missed) Lawrence; (penalty missed) Gilles; (penalty missed) Leon; (penalty scored) Rose; (penalty scored) Grosso

International Stadium Yokohama, Yokohama
Referee: Anastasia Pustovoitova (Russia)

Sweden	Canada

GK	1	Hedvig Lindahl
RB	4	Hanna Glas
CB	13	Amanda Ilestedt		(substituted off) 120'
CB	14	Nathalie Björn
LB	6	Magdalena Eriksson		(substituted off) 75'
CM	16	Filippa Angeldal		(substituted off) 75'
CM	17	Caroline Seger (c)
RW	10	Sofia Jakobsson		(substituted off) 75'
AM	9	Kosovare Asllani	(yellow card) 104'
LW	18	Fridolina Rolfö		(substituted off) 106'
CF	11	Stina Blackstenius		(substituted off) 106'
Substitutions:
DF	2	Jonna Andersson		(substituted on) 75'
MF	5	Hanna Bennison		(substituted on) 75'
FW	8	Lina Hurtig		(substituted on) 75'
FW	19	Anna Anvegård		(substituted on) 106'
MF	15	Olivia Schough		(substituted on) 106'
DF	3	Emma Kullberg		(substituted on) 120'
Manager:
Peter Gerhardsson

GK	1	Stephanie Labbé
RB	10	Ashley Lawrence
CB	14	Vanessa Gilles
CB	3	Kadeisha Buchanan
LB	2	Allysha Chapman		(substituted off) 93'
DM	11	Desiree Scott		(substituted off) 120+2'
CM	17	Jessie Fleming
CM	5	Quinn		(substituted off) 46'
AM	12	Christine Sinclair (c)		(substituted off) 86'
CF	16	Janine Beckie	(yellow card) 27'	(substituted off) 46'
CF	15	Nichelle Prince		(substituted off) 63'
Substitutions:
MF	7	Julia Grosso		(substituted on) 46'
FW	9	Adriana Leon		(substituted on) 46'
FW	6	Deanne Rose		(substituted on) 63'
FW	19	Jordyn Huitema		(substituted on) 86'
DF	8	Jayde Riviere		(substituted on) 93'
DF	4	Shelina Zadorsky		(substituted on) 120+2'
Manager:
(United Kingdom) Bev Priestman

Assistant referees:
Ekaterina Kurochkina (Russia)
Sanja Rodak (Croatia)
Fourth official:
Salima Mukansanga (Rwanda)
Reserve assistant referee:
Kim Kyong-min (South Korea)
Video assistant referee:
Bibiana Steinhaus (Germany)
Assistant video assistant referee:
Marco Guida (Italy)
