= Football at the 2020 Summer Olympics =

Football at the Games of the XXXII Olympiad
- Football pictogram for the 2020 Summer Olympics

Event details
- Games: 2020 Summer Olympics
- Host country: Japan
- Dates: 21 July – 7 August 2021
- Venues: Six stadiums across Japan (in 6 host cities)
- Competitors: 504 from 24 nations

Men's tournament
- Teams: 16 (from 6 confederations)
Medalists
Gold	Brazil
Silver	Spain
Bronze	Mexico

Women's tournament
- Teams: 12 (from 6 confederations)
Medalists
Gold	Canada
Silver	Sweden
Bronze	United States

Editions
- ← 2016 2024 →

The football tournament at the 2020 Summer Olympics was held from 21 July to 7 August 2021 in Japan.

In addition to the Olympic host city of Tokyo, matches were also played in Kashima, Saitama, Sapporo, Rifu and Yokohama.

Two events were contested: a men's and women's competitions. Associations affiliated with FIFA may send teams to participate in the tournament. There were no age restrictions on women's teams, while men's teams were restricted to under-24 players (born on or after 1 January 1997) with a maximum of three overage players allowed. The men's tournament is typically restricted to under-23 players, though following the postponement of the Olympics by a year, FIFA decided to maintain the restriction of players born on or after 1 January 1997. In June 2020, FIFA approved the use of the video assistant referee (VAR) system at the Olympics. Teams were restricted to 18 athletes, however due to the COVID-19 pandemic, rosters were allowed to consist of up to 22 athletes.

Brazil were the men's defending champions. Germany won the previous women's tournament, but failed to qualify after losing to Sweden in the quarter-finals of the 2019 FIFA Women's World Cup.

== Schedule ==
Legend
G	Group stage	¼	Quarter-finals	½	Semi-finals	B	Bronze medal match	F	Gold medal match

Date Event	21 Wed	22 Thu	23 Fri	24 Sat	25 Sun	26 Mon	27 Tue	28 Wed	29 Thu	30 Fri	31 Sat	1 Sun	2 Mon	3 Tue	4 Wed	5 Thu	6 Fri	7 Sat
Men		G			G			G			¼			½			B	F
Women	G			G			G			¼			½			B	F	

== Venues ==
A total of six venues were used:

Chōfu (Tokyo Area)	Saitama	Yokohama
Tokyo Stadium	Saitama Stadium 2002	International Stadium Yokohama
Capacity: 49,970	Capacity: 63,700	Capacity: 72,327
Kashima	Location of the host cities of the football at the 2020 Summer Olympics.	
Ibaraki Kashima Stadium	Location of the host cities of the football at the 2020 Summer Olympics.	
Capacity: 37,638	Location of the host cities of the football at the 2020 Summer Olympics.	
Rifu	Location of the host cities of the football at the 2020 Summer Olympics.	
Miyagi Stadium	Location of the host cities of the football at the 2020 Summer Olympics.	
Capacity: 49,133	Location of the host cities of the football at the 2020 Summer Olympics.	
Sapporo	Location of the host cities of the football at the 2020 Summer Olympics.	
Sapporo Dome	Location of the host cities of the football at the 2020 Summer Olympics.	
Capacity: 42,065	Location of the host cities of the football at the 2020 Summer Olympics.	

== Qualification ==
The Organizing Committee for FIFA Competitions ratified the distribution of spots at their meeting on 14 September 2017.

=== Summary ===
Nation	Men's	Women's	Athletes
Argentina	Yes		22
Australia	Yes	Yes	44
Brazil	Yes	Yes	44
Canada		Yes	22
Chile		Yes	22
China		Yes	22
Egypt	Yes		22
France	Yes		21
Great Britain		Yes	22
Ivory Coast	Yes		21
Germany	Yes		19
Honduras	Yes		22
Japan	Yes	Yes	44
Mexico	Yes		22
New Zealand	Yes	Yes	44
Netherlands		Yes	22
Romania	Yes		22
South Africa	Yes		19
Saudi Arabia	Yes		22
South Korea	Yes		22
Spain	Yes		22
Sweden		Yes	22
United States		Yes	22
Zambia		Yes	22
Total: 24 NOCs	16	12	608

=== Men's qualification ===
In addition to the host nation Japan, 15 men's national teams qualified from six separate continental confederations.

Means of qualification	Ref.	Dates^{1}	Venue(s)^{1}	Berth(s)	Qualified
Host nation		—N/a	—N/a	1	Japan
2019 UEFA European Under-21 Championship		16–30 June 2019	Italy; San Marino	4	Spain; Germany; France; Romania
2019 OFC Men's Olympic Qualifying Tournament		21 September – 5 October 2019	Fiji	1	New Zealand
2019 Africa U-23 Cup of Nations		8–22 November 2019	Egypt	3	Egypt; Ivory Coast; South Africa
2020 AFC U-23 Championship		8–26 January 2020	Thailand	3	South Korea; Saudi Arabia; Australia
2020 CONMEBOL Pre-Olympic Tournament		18 January – 9 February 2020	Colombia	2	Argentina; Brazil
2020 CONCACAF Olympic Qualifying Championship		18–30 March 2021	Mexico	2	Mexico; Honduras
Total				16	

- ^1Dates and venues are those of final tournaments (or final round of qualification tournaments), various qualification stages may precede matches at these specific venues.

=== Women's qualification ===
In addition to hosts Japan, 11 women's national teams qualified from six separate continental confederations.

For the first time, as per an agreement between the four British football associations (England, Northern Ireland, Scotland and Wales), Great Britain qualified for the Olympics through England's performance in the World Cup (a procedure already successfully employed by Team GB in field hockey and rugby sevens). Scotland also participated in the World Cup but, under the agreement whereby the highest ranked home nation is nominated to compete for the purposes of Olympic qualification, their performance was not taken into account.

Means of qualification	Dates^{2}	Venue(s)^{2}	Berth(s)	Qualified
Host nation	—N/a	—N/a	1	Japan
2018 Copa América	4–22 April 2018	Chile	1	Brazil
2018 OFC Nations Cup	18 November – 1 December 2018	New Caledonia	1	New Zealand
2019 FIFA Women's World Cup (as UEFA qualifying)	7 June – 7 July 2019	France	3	Netherlands; Sweden; Great Britain
2020 CONCACAF Olympic Qualifying Championship	28 January – 9 February 2020	United States	2	United States; Canada
2020 CAF Olympic Qualifying Tournament	5–10 March 2020	Multiple	1	Zambia
2020 AFC Olympic Qualifying Tournament	6–11 March 2020 & 8–13 April 2021	Multiple	2	Australia; China
CAF–CONMEBOL play-off	10–13 April 2021	Turkey	1	Chile
Total			12	

- ^2Dates and venues are those of final tournaments (or final round of qualification tournaments), various qualification stages may precede matches at these specific venues.

== Final draw ==
The draws for the men's and women's tournaments was held on 21 April 2021, 10:00 CEST (UTC+2), at the FIFA headquarters in Zürich, Switzerland.

== Medal summary ==
=== Medal table ===
Rank	NOC	Gold	Silver	Bronze	Total
1	Brazil	1	0	0	1
1	Canada	1	0	0	1
3	Spain	0	1	0	1
3	Sweden	0	1	0	1
5	Mexico	0	0	1	1
5	United States	0	0	1	1
Totals (6 entries)		2	2	2	6

=== Medalists ===
Event	Gold	Silver	Bronze
Men	Brazil; Aderbar Santos; Gabriel Menino; Diego Carlos; Ricardo Graça; Douglas Luiz; Guilherme Arana; Paulinho; Bruno Guimarães; Matheus Cunha; Richarlison; Antony; Brenno; Dani Alves; Bruno Fuchs; Nino; Abner; Malcom; Matheus Henrique; Reinier Jesus; Claudinho; Gabriel Martinelli; Lucão	Spain; Unai Simón; Óscar Mingueza; Marc Cucurella; Pau Torres; Jesús Vallejo; Martín Zubimendi; Marco Asensio; Mikel Merino; Rafa Mir; Dani Ceballos; Mikel Oyarzabal; Eric García; Álvaro Fernández; Carlos Soler; Jon Moncayola; Pedri; Javi Puado; Óscar Gil; Dani Olmo; Juan Miranda; Bryan Gil; Iván Villar	Mexico; Luis Malagón; Jorge Sánchez; César Montes; Jesús Angulo; Johan Vásquez; Vladimir Loroña; Luis Romo; Carlos Rodríguez; Henry Martín; Diego Lainez; Alexis Vega; Adrián Mora; Guillermo Ochoa; Érick Aguirre; Uriel Antuna; José Joaquín Esquivel; Sebastián Córdova; Eduardo Aguirre; Ricardo Angulo; Fernando Beltrán; Roberto Alvarado; Sebastián Jurado
Women	Canada; Stephanie Labbé; Allysha Chapman; Kadeisha Buchanan; Shelina Zadorsky; Quinn; Deanne Rose; Julia Grosso; Jayde Riviere; Adriana Leon; Ashley Lawrence; Desiree Scott; Christine Sinclair; Évelyne Viens; Vanessa Gilles; Nichelle Prince; Janine Beckie; Jessie Fleming; Kailen Sheridan; Jordyn Huitema; Sophie Schmidt; Gabrielle Carle; Erin McLeod	Sweden; Hedvig Lindahl; Jonna Andersson; Emma Kullberg; Hanna Glas; Hanna Bennison; Magdalena Eriksson; Madelen Janogy; Lina Hurtig; Kosovare Asllani; Sofia Jakobsson; Stina Blackstenius; Jennifer Falk; Amanda Ilestedt; Nathalie Björn; Olivia Schough; Filippa Angeldal; Caroline Seger; Fridolina Rolfö; Anna Anvegård; Julia Roddar; Rebecka Blomqvist; Zećira Mušović	United States; Alyssa Naeher; Crystal Dunn; Sam Mewis; Becky Sauerbrunn; Kelley O'Hara; Kristie Mewis; Tobin Heath; Julie Ertz; Lindsey Horan; Carli Lloyd; Christen Press; Tierna Davidson; Alex Morgan; Emily Sonnett; Megan Rapinoe; Rose Lavelle; Abby Dahlkemper; Adrianna Franch; Catarina Macario; Casey Krueger; Lynn Williams; Jane Campbell

== Men's competition ==
The competition consisted of two stages: a group stage with four groups of four teams, followed by a knockout stage contested by eight teams which advanced as group winners and runners-up. The 16 teams were drawn into four groups of four teams. The hosts Japan were automatically seeded into Pot 1 and assigned to position A1, while the remaining teams were seeded into their respective pots based on their results in the last five Olympics (more recent tournaments weighted more heavily), with bonus points awarded to confederation champions. No group could contain more than one team from each confederation.

=== Group stage ===
==== Group A ====
Pos	Team	Pld	W	D	L	GF	GA	GD	Pts	Qualification
1	Japan (H)	3	3	0	0	7	1	+6	9	Advance to knockout stage
2	Mexico	3	2	0	1	8	3	+5	6	Advance to knockout stage
3	France	3	1	0	2	5	11	−6	3	
4	South Africa	3	0	0	3	3	8	−5	0	

Source: TOCOG and FIFA
(H) Hosts

==== Group B ====
Pos	Team	Pld	W	D	L	GF	GA	GD	Pts	Qualification
1	South Korea	3	2	0	1	10	1	+9	6	Advance to knockout stage
2	New Zealand	3	1	1	1	3	3	0	4	Advance to knockout stage
3	Romania	3	1	1	1	1	4	−3	4	
4	Honduras	3	1	0	2	3	9	−6	3	

Source: TOCOG and FIFA

==== Group C ====
Pos	Team	Pld	W	D	L	GF	GA	GD	Pts	Qualification
1	Spain	3	1	2	0	2	1	+1	5	Advance to knockout stage
2	Egypt	3	1	1	1	2	1	+1	4	Advance to knockout stage
3	Argentina	3	1	1	1	2	3	−1	4	
4	Australia	3	1	0	2	2	3	−1	3	

Source: TOCOG and FIFA

==== Group D ====
Pos	Team	Pld	W	D	L	GF	GA	GD	Pts	Qualification
1	Brazil	3	2	1	0	7	3	+4	7	Advance to knockout stage
2	Ivory Coast	3	1	2	0	3	2	+1	5	Advance to knockout stage
3	Germany	3	1	1	1	6	7	−1	4	
4	Saudi Arabia	3	0	0	3	4	8	−4	0	

Source: TOCOG and FIFA

=== Knockout stage ===
Quarter-finals
31 July – Yokohama
South Korea	3
Mexico	6
31 July – Saitama
Brazil	1
Egypt	0
31 July – Kashima
Japan (p)	0 (4)
New Zealand	0 (2)
31 July – Rifu
Spain (a.e.t.)	5
Ivory Coast	2

Semi-finals
3 August – Kashima
Mexico	0 (1)
Brazil (p)	0 (4)
3 August – Saitama
Japan	0
Spain (a.e.t.)	1

Gold medal match
7 August – Yokohama
Brazil (a.e.t.)	2
Spain	1
Bronze medal match
6 August – Saitama
Mexico	3
Japan	1

== Women's competition ==
The competition consisted of two stages: a group stage with three groups of four teams, followed by a knockout stage contested by eight teams which advanced as group winners and runners-up plus the two best third-placed teams. The 12 teams will be drawn into three groups of four teams. The hosts Japan were automatically seeded into Pot 1 and assigned to position E1, while the remaining teams were seeded into their respective pots based on the FIFA Women's World Rankings released on 16 April 2021. As Great Britain are not a FIFA member and therefore do not have a ranking, they would be seeded based on the FIFA ranking of England, who qualified on behalf of Great Britain. No group could contain more than one team from each confederation.

=== Group stage ===
==== Group E ====
Pos	Team	Pld	W	D	L	GF	GA	GD	Pts	Qualification
1	Great Britain	3	2	1	0	4	1	+3	7	Advance to knockout stage
2	Canada	3	1	2	0	4	3	+1	5	Advance to knockout stage
3	Japan (H)	3	1	1	1	2	2	0	4	Advance to knockout stage
4	Chile	3	0	0	3	1	5	−4	0	

Source: TOCOG and FIFA
(H) Hosts

==== Group F ====
Pos	Team	Pld	W	D	L	GF	GA	GD	Pts	Qualification
1	Netherlands	3	2	1	0	21	8	+13	7	Advance to knockout stage
2	Brazil	3	2	1	0	9	3	+6	7	Advance to knockout stage
3	Zambia	3	0	1	2	7	15	−8	1	
4	China	3	0	1	2	6	17	−11	1	

Source: TOCOG and FIFA

==== Group G ====
Pos	Team	Pld	W	D	L	GF	GA	GD	Pts	Qualification
1	Sweden	3	3	0	0	9	2	+7	9	Advance to knockout stage
2	United States	3	1	1	1	6	4	+2	4	Advance to knockout stage
3	Australia	3	1	1	1	4	5	−1	4	Advance to knockout stage
4	New Zealand	3	0	0	3	2	10	−8	0	

Source: TOCOG and FIFA

=== Knockout stage ===
Quarter-finals
30 July – Kashima
Great Britain	3
Australia (a.e.t.)	4
30 July – Saitama
Sweden	3
Japan	1
30 July – Yokohama
Netherlands	2 (2)
United States (p)	2 (4)
30 July – Rifu
Canada (p)	0 (4)
Brazil	0 (3)

Semi-finals
2 August – Yokohama
Australia	0
Sweden	1
2 August – Kashima
United States	0
Canada	1

Gold medal match
6 August – Yokohama
Sweden	1 (2)
Canada (p)	1 (3)
Bronze medal match
5 August – Kashima
Australia	3
United States	4

== See also ==
- Football at the 2018 Asian Games
- Football at the 2019 African Games
- Football at the 2019 Pan American Games
- Football 5-a-side at the 2020 Summer Paralympics
