= Football at the 2020 Summer Olympics – Women's tournament – Group E =

Football at the Olympics

Group E of the women's football tournament at the 2020 Summer Olympics was played from 21 to 27 July 2021 and included Canada, Chile, Great Britain and hosts Japan. The top two teams, Great Britain and Canada, advanced to the knockout stage, along with third-placed Japan as one of the two best third-placed teams among all three groups.

== Teams ==
Draw position	Team	Pot	Confederation	Method of qualification	Date of qualification	Olympic appearance	Last appearance	Previous best performance	FIFA Rankings	
Draw position	Team	Pot	Confederation	Method of qualification	Date of qualification	Olympic appearance	Last appearance	Previous best performance	April 2021 (Note: The rankings of April 2021 were used for seeding for the final draw.)	June 2021
E1	Japan	1	AFC	Hosts	7 September 2013	5th	2012	Silver medalists (2012)	11	10
E2	Canada	3	CONCACAF	2020 CONCACAF Women's Olympic Qualifying Championship 2nd place	7 February 2020	4th	2016	Bronze medalists (2012, 2016)	8	8
E3	Great Britain	2	UEFA (Note: As Great Britain is not a member of FIFA, England (a member of UEFA as well) qualified on behalf of Great Britain, and England's ranking was also used for seeding.)	2019 FIFA Women's World Cup 3rd place European team	28 June 2019	2nd	2012	Quarter-finals (2012)	6	6
E4	Chile	4	CONMEBOL	CAF–CONMEBOL play-off winners	13 April 2021	1st	—	Debut	37	37

== Standings ==
Pos	Team	Pld	W	D	L	GF	GA	GD	Pts	Qualification
1	Great Britain	3	2	1	0	4	1	+3	7	Advance to knockout stage
2	Canada	3	1	2	0	4	3	+1	5	Advance to knockout stage
3	Japan (H)	3	1	1	1	2	2	0	4	Advance to knockout stage
4	Chile	3	0	0	3	1	5	−4	0	

Source: TOCOG and FIFA
Rules for classification: Group stage tiebreakers
(H) Hosts

In the quarter-finals,

- The winner of Group E, Great Britain, advanced to play the third-placed team of Group G, Australia.
- The runner-up of Group E, Canada, advanced to play the runner-up of Group F, Brazil.
- The third-placed team of Group E, Japan, advanced as one of the two best third-placed teams to play the winner of Group G, Sweden.

== Matches ==
=== Great Britain vs Chile ===
21 July 2021
16:30

Great Britain	2–0	Chile
White 18', 73'	Report (TOCOG); Report (FIFA)

Sapporo Dome, Sapporo
Attendance: 0
Referee: Salima Mukansanga (Rwanda)

Great Britain	Chile

GK	1	Ellie Roebuck
RB	2	Lucy Bronze
CB	5	Steph Houghton (c)
CB	14	Millie Bright
LB	12	Rachel Daly
CM	4	Keira Walsh	(substituted off) 69'
CM	11	Caroline Weir	(substituted off) 90'
RW	17	Georgia Stanway
AM	8	Kim Little	(substituted off) 90+2'
LW	15	Lauren Hemp	(substituted off) 68'
CF	9	Ellen White
Substitutions:
FW	7	Nikita Parris	(substituted on) 68'
MF	6	Sophie Ingle	(substituted on) 69'
MF	18	Jill Scott	(substituted on) 90'
FW	20	Ella Toone	(substituted on) 90+2'
Manager:
(Norway) Hege Riise

GK	1	Christiane Endler (c)
RB	6	Nayadet López	(substituted off) 81'
CB	14	Daniela Pardo
CB	3	Carla Guerrero
LB	18	Camila Sáez
RM	15	Daniela Zamora
CM	8	Karen Araya
CM	4	Francisca Lara
LM	10	Yanara Aedo	(substituted off) 78'
AM	11	Yessenia López	(substituted off) 70'
CF	9	María José Urrutia
Substitutions:
MF	20	Francisca Mardones	(substituted on) 70'
FW	7	Yenny Acuña	(substituted on) 78'
FW	16	Rosario Balmaceda	(substituted on) 81'
Manager:
José Letelier

Assistant referees:
Bernadettar Kwimbira (Malawi)
Mary Njorge (Kenya)
Fourth official:
Ndidi Patience Madu (Nigeria)
Video assistant referee:
Abdulla Al-Marri (Qatar)
Assistant video assistant referee:
Muhammad Taqi (Singapore)

=== Japan vs Canada ===
21 July 2021
19:30

Japan	1–1	Canada
Iwabuchi 84'	Report (TOCOG); Report (FIFA)	Sinclair 6'

Sapporo Dome, Sapporo
Attendance: 0
Referee: Edina Alves Batista (Brazil)

Japan	Canada

GK	1	Sakiko Ikeda
RB	2	Risa Shimizu
CB	4	Saki Kumagai (c)
CB	5	Moeka Minami
LB	17	Nanami Kitamura
RM	13	Yuzuho Shiokoshi	(substituted off) 62'
CM	8	Narumi Miura
CM	7	Emi Nakajima	(substituted off) 76'
LM	14	Yui Hasegawa	(substituted off) 90'
CF	9	Yuika Sugasawa	(substituted off) 46'
CF	10	Mana Iwabuchi
Substitutions:
FW	11	Mina Tanaka	(substituted on) 46'
FW	12	Jun Endo	(substituted on) 62'
MF	6	Hina Sugita	(substituted on) 76'
FW	15	Yuka Momiki	(substituted on) 90'
Manager:
Asako Takakura

GK	1	Stephanie Labbé	(yellow card) 53'	(substituted off) 58'
RB	10	Ashley Lawrence
CB	3	Kadeisha Buchanan
CB	4	Shelina Zadorsky
LB	2	Allysha Chapman
CM	11	Desiree Scott
CM	5	Quinn		(substituted off) 73'
RW	15	Nichelle Prince		(substituted off) 85'
AM	17	Jessie Fleming
LW	16	Janine Beckie
CF	12	Christine Sinclair (c)		(substituted off) 85'
Substitutions:
GK	18	Kailen Sheridan		(substituted on) 58'
FW	6	Deanne Rose		(substituted on) 73'
FW	13	Évelyne Viens		(substituted on) 85'
FW	9	Adriana Leon		(substituted on) 85'
Manager:
(United Kingdom) Bev Priestman

Assistant referees:
Neuza Back (Brazil)
Mónica Amboya (Ecuador)
Fourth official:
Maria Rivet (Mauritius)
Video assistant referee:
Wagner Reway (Brazil)
Assistant video assistant referee:
Tiago Martins (Portugal)

=== Chile vs Canada ===
24 July 2021
16:30

Chile	1–2	Canada
Araya 57' (pen.)	Report (TOCOG); Report (FIFA)	Beckie 39', 47'

Sapporo Dome, Sapporo
Attendance: 0
Referee: Esther Staubli (Switzerland)

Chile	Canada

GK	1	Christiane Endler (c)
RB	16	Rosario Balmaceda
CB	14	Daniela Pardo	(yellow card) 19'	(substituted off) 90+3'
CB	3	Carla Guerrero
LB	18	Camila Sáez
RM	15	Daniela Zamora
CM	8	Karen Araya
CM	4	Francisca Lara
LM	10	Yanara Aedo
AM	11	Yessenia López	(yellow card) 64'	(substituted off) 85'
CF	9	María José Urrutia
Substitutions:
FW	7	Yenny Acuña		(substituted on) 85'
FW	19	Javiera Grez		(substituted on) 90+3'
Manager:
José Letelier

GK	18	Kailen Sheridan
RB	10	Ashley Lawrence
CB	3	Kadeisha Buchanan
CB	4	Shelina Zadorsky
LB	8	Jayde Riviere
CM	11	Desiree Scott	(yellow card) 79'
CM	7	Julia Grosso		(substituted off) 61'
RW	16	Janine Beckie
AM	17	Jessie Fleming
LW	15	Nichelle Prince		(substituted off) 61'
CF	12	Christine Sinclair (c)
Substitutions:
MF	5	Quinn		(substituted on) 61'
FW	6	Deanne Rose		(substituted on) 61'
Manager:
(United Kingdom) Bev Priestman

Assistant referees:
Katrin Rafalski (Germany)
Susanne Küng (Switzerland)
Fourth official:
Maria Rivet (Mauritius)
Video assistant referee:
Muhammad Taqi (Singapore)
Assistant video assistant referee:
Abdulla Al-Marri (Qatar)

=== Japan vs Great Britain ===
24 July 2021
19:30

Japan	0–1	Great Britain
	Report (TOCOG); Report (FIFA)	White 74'

Sapporo Dome, Sapporo
Attendance: 0
Referee: Anastasia Pustovoitova (Russia)

Japan	Great Britain

GK	18	Ayaka Yamashita	(yellow card) 79'
RB	2	Risa Shimizu
CB	4	Saki Kumagai (c)
CB	5	Moeka Minami
LB	16	Asato Miyagawa
RM	13	Yuzuho Shiokoshi		(substituted off) 55'
CM	7	Emi Nakajima		(substituted off) 80'
CM	6	Hina Sugita
LM	14	Yui Hasegawa
CF	20	Honoka Hayashi	(yellow card) 30'	(substituted off) 67'
CF	11	Mina Tanaka		(substituted off) 67'
Substitutions:
FW	15	Yuka Momiki		(substituted on) 55'
FW	12	Jun Endo		(substituted on) 67'
MF	8	Narumi Miura		(substituted on) 67'
FW	10	Mana Iwabuchi		(substituted on) 80'
Manager:
Asako Takakura

GK	1	Ellie Roebuck
RB	2	Lucy Bronze
CB	5	Steph Houghton (c)
CB	16	Leah Williamson
LB	3	Demi Stokes
CM	4	Keira Walsh
CM	6	Sophie Ingle	(substituted off) 59'
RW	7	Nikita Parris	(substituted off) 76'
AM	8	Kim Little	(substituted off) 89'
LW	15	Lauren Hemp	(substituted off) 88'
CF	9	Ellen White
Substitutions:
MF	11	Caroline Weir	(substituted on) 59'
DF	12	Rachel Daly	(substituted on) 76'
MF	17	Georgia Stanway	(substituted on) 88'
MF	18	Jill Scott	(substituted on) 89'
Manager:
(Norway) Hege Riise

Assistant referees:
Ekaterina Kurochkina (Russia)
Sanja Rodak (Croatia)
Fourth official:
Ndidi Patience Madu (Nigeria)
Video assistant referee:
Bibiana Steinhaus (Germany)
Assistant video assistant referee:
Chris Penso (United States)

=== Chile vs Japan ===
27 July 2021
20:00

Chile	0–1	Japan
	Report (TOCOG); Report (FIFA)	Tanaka 77'

Miyagi Stadium, Rifu
Attendance: 1,326
Referee: Melissa Borjas (Honduras)

Chile	Japan

GK	1	Christiane Endler (c)
CB	14	Daniela Pardo	(substituted off) 76'
CB	3	Carla Guerrero
CB	18	Camila Sáez
RM	16	Rosario Balmaceda	(substituted off) 46'
CM	8	Karen Araya
CM	11	Yessenia López	(substituted off) 83'
LM	4	Francisca Lara
AM	10	Yanara Aedo	(substituted off) 83'
CF	9	María José Urrutia
CF	15	Daniela Zamora	(substituted off) 56'
Substitutions:
DF	17	Javiera Toro	(substituted on) 46'
FW	19	Javiera Grez	(substituted on) 56'
MF	20	Francisca Mardones	(substituted on) 76'
FW	7	Yenny Acuña	(substituted on) 83'
DF	13	Fernanda Pinilla	(substituted on) 83'
Manager:
José Letelier

GK	18	Ayaka Yamashita
RB	2	Risa Shimizu
CB	4	Saki Kumagai (c)	(yellow card) 90'
CB	3	Saori Takarada
LB	17	Nanami Kitamura
RM	14	Yui Hasegawa		(substituted off) 66'
CM	8	Narumi Miura	(yellow card) 60'	(substituted off) 83'
CM	20	Honoka Hayashi		(substituted off) 55'
LM	6	Hina Sugita
CF	10	Mana Iwabuchi
CF	9	Yuika Sugasawa		(substituted off) 46'
Substitutions:
FW	11	Mina Tanaka		(substituted on) 46'
FW	12	Jun Endo		(substituted on) 55'
MF	21	Momoka Kinoshita		(substituted on) 66'
MF	7	Emi Nakajima		(substituted on) 83'
Manager:
Asako Takakura

Assistant referees:
Shirley Perello (Honduras)
Mary Blanco (Colombia)
Fourth official:
Ndidi Patience Madu (Nigeria)
Video assistant referee:
Paweł Raczkowski (Poland)
Assistant video assistant referee:
Roi Reinshreiber (Israel)

=== Canada vs Great Britain ===
27 July 2021
20:00

Canada	1–1	Great Britain
Leon 55'	Report (TOCOG); Report (FIFA)	Prince 85' (o.g.)

Kashima Stadium, Kashima
Attendance: 0
Referee: Kateryna Monzul (Ukraine)

Canada	Great Britain

GK	1	Stephanie Labbé
RB	8	Jayde Riviere	(yellow card) 24'
CB	3	Kadeisha Buchanan (c)
CB	14	Vanessa Gilles
LB	10	Ashley Lawrence		(substituted off) 81'
CM	20	Sophie Schmidt
CM	5	Quinn		(substituted off) 67'
RW	6	Deanne Rose		(substituted off) 46'
AM	16	Janine Beckie		(substituted off) 46'
LW	9	Adriana Leon
CF	13	Évelyne Viens		(substituted off) 54'
Substitutions:
MF	17	Jessie Fleming		(substituted on) 46'
FW	19	Jordyn Huitema		(substituted on) 46'
FW	15	Nichelle Prince		(substituted on) 54'
MF	7	Julia Grosso		(substituted on) 67'
DF	21	Gabrielle Carle		(substituted on) 81'
Manager:
(United Kingdom) Bev Priestman

GK	1	Ellie Roebuck
RB	2	Lucy Bronze
CB	16	Leah Williamson
CB	14	Millie Bright
LB	3	Demi Stokes
CM	18	Jill Scott	(substituted off) 63'
CM	6	Sophie Ingle (c)	(substituted off) 77'
RW	12	Rachel Daly	(substituted off) 63'
AM	11	Caroline Weir
LW	17	Georgia Stanway
CF	7	Nikita Parris
Substitutions:
MF	8	Kim Little	(substituted on) 63'
FW	9	Ellen White	(substituted on) 63'
FW	10	Fran Kirby	(substituted on) 77'
Manager:
(Norway) Hege Riise

Assistant referees:
Lucie Ratajová (Czech Republic)
Maryna Striletska (Ukraine)
Fourth official:
Kate Jacewicz (Australia)
Video assistant referee:
Mahmoud Mohamed Ashour (Egypt)
Assistant video assistant referee:
Wagner Reway (Brazil)

== Discipline ==
Fair play points would have been used as a tiebreaker if the overall and head-to-head records of teams were tied. These were calculated based on yellow and red cards received in all group matches as follows:

- first yellow card: minus 1 point;
- indirect red card (second yellow card): minus 3 points;
- direct red card: minus 4 points;
- yellow card and direct red card: minus 5 points;

Only one of the above deductions could be applied to a player in a single match.

Team	Match 1				Match 2				Match 3				Points
Team	Booked	(yellow card) (yellow-red card)	Sent off (straight red)	(yellow card) (red card)	Booked	(yellow card) (yellow-red card)	Sent off (straight red)	(yellow card) (red card)	Booked	(yellow card) (yellow-red card)	Sent off (straight red)	(yellow card) (red card)	Points
Great Britain													0
Chile					2								−2
Canada	1				1				1				−3
Japan					2				2				−4
