= Nathalie Björn =

Swedish footballer (born 1997)

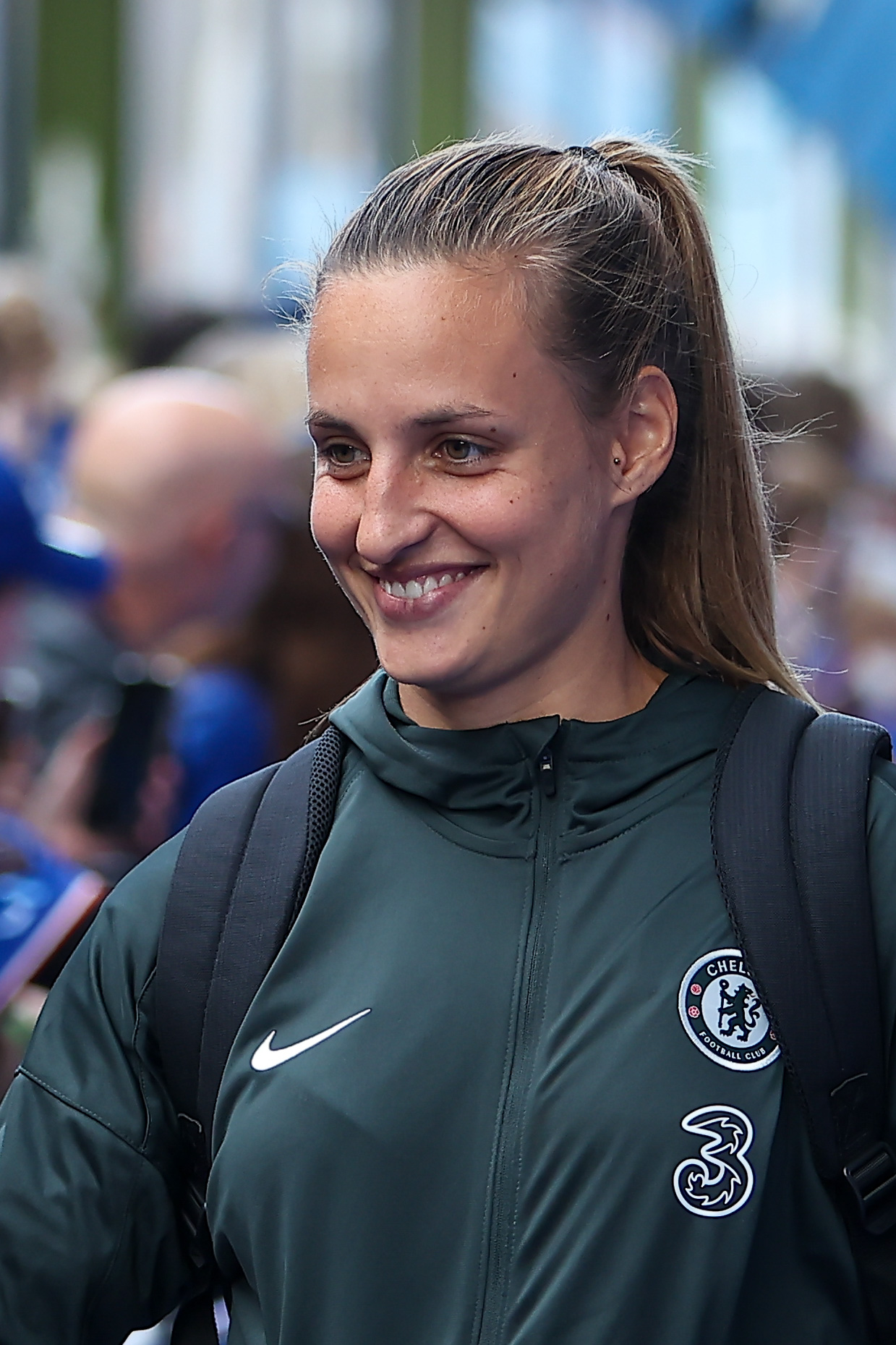
- Björn in 2025

Personal information
- Full name: Gun Nathalie Björn
- Date of birth: 4 May 1997 (age 29)
- Place of birth: Uppsala, Sweden
- Height: 1.74 m (5 ft 9 in)
- Positions: Defender; central midfielder

Team information
- Current team: Chelsea
- Number: 14

Senior career*
Years	Team	Apps	(Gls)
2012	Vaksala SK		
2013	IK Sirius	8	
2014–2015	AIK	34	(0)
2016–2017	Eskilstuna United	39	(0)
2018–2021	Rosengård	68	(4)
2021–2024	Everton	44	(2)
2024–	Chelsea	39	(3)

International career^{‡}
2013	Sweden U17	11	(2)
2014–2015	Sweden U19	29	(5)
2016–	Sweden	84	(7)
Medal record
Women's soccer
Representing Sweden
Olympic Games
Silver medal – second place	2020 Tokyo	Team
FIFA Women's World Cup
Bronze medal – third place	2019 France	Team
Bronze medal – third place	2023 Australia/New Zealand	Team
- * Club domestic league appearances and goals as of 21 November 2026 ‡ National team caps and goals as of 13 October 2026

Gun Nathalie Björn (Swedish: [ɡʉːn nataˈliː ˈbjœːɳ]; born 4 May 1997) is a Swedish professional footballer who plays as a defender for Women's Super League club Chelsea and the Sweden national team.

== Club career ==
=== Early career ===
Björn started at Vaksala SK, a sports club in Uppsala, for which she played in the Swedish Cup at age 14. In 2013, as a 16-year-old, she played for IK Sirius in the Elitettan, the second division in Swedish football, which was newly founded that year. Finishing third, the club narrowly missed promotion to the Damallsvenskan. Björn then moved to second-placed AIK and played for them in the first division the following season, where they narrowly avoided relegation as third-to-last. In the 2015 season, the club came last and was relegated again.

Björn then moved to runners-up Eskilstuna United. With this she came third in 2016 and 2017 and took part in the 2016/17 UEFA Champions League, where she played over 90 minutes in the two wins against Glasgow City FC in the round of 16. In the round of 16 against VfL Wolfsburg she was substituted in after 81 minutes.

=== Rosengård ===
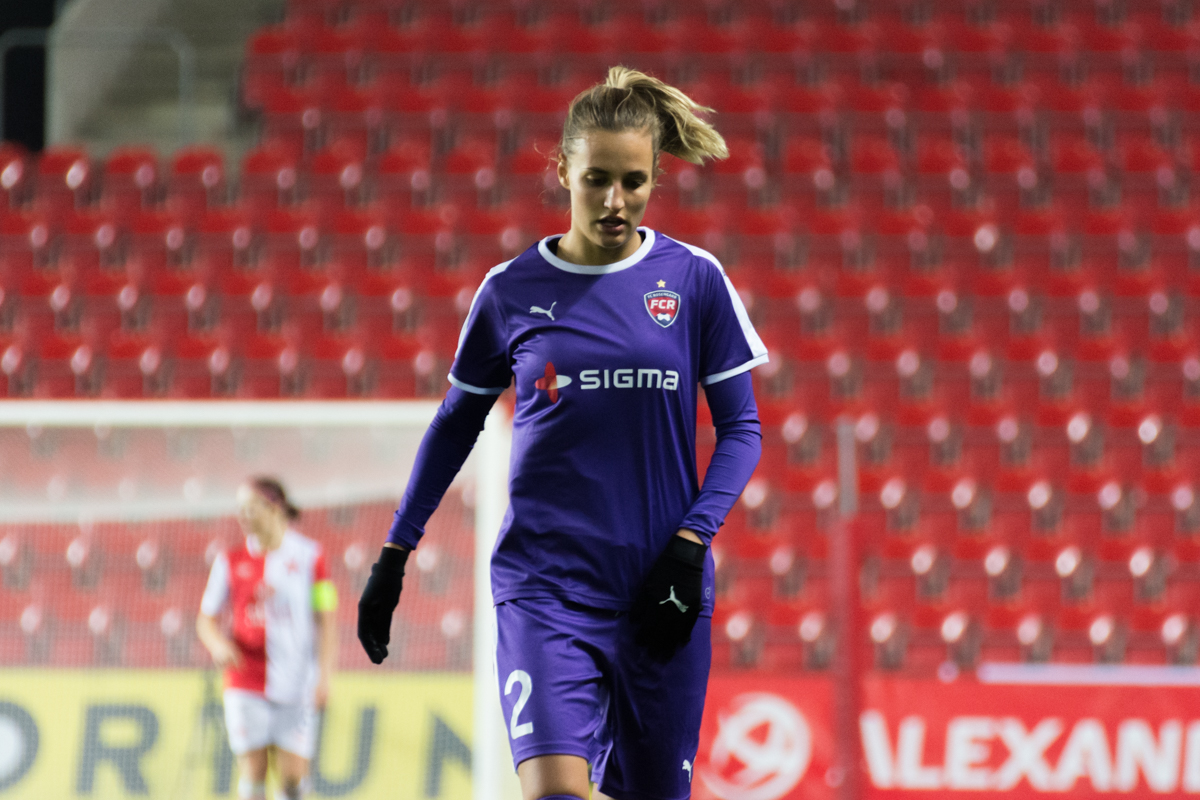
Björn playing for Rosengård against Slavia Prague, November 2018

After two seasons with Eskilstuna, Björn moved to runner-up FC Rosengård, with whom she finished third in the 2018 season. On 18 May 2018, she became cup winner with Rosengård and won her first national title. In the 2018/19 Champions League, she played the full distance in four games, but was eliminated in the round of 16 after a 3–2 home defeat and a goalless away draw against Slavia Prague. On the first matchday of the 2019 season, she scored the only goal of the game in the 90th minute against her old club Eskilstuna United, making her her first ever league goal. Overall, she was used in 17 of 22 games in the season that ended with her team winning the championship. In the 2020 season she was used in all 22 games.

=== Everton ===
In 2021, after eight games in the Damallsvenskan season, Björn moved to Everton, where she received a three-year contract. In the final fixture of the 2021–22 season, she scored her first goal for Everton in the 1–1 draw against Brighton. In the 2022–23 season, she was in the 81st percentile for tackles among center backs. She was named Player of the Season for 2022–23. Along with her Swedish teammate Hanna Bennison, Björn progressed the furthest in the 2023 World Cup of any Everton player. After coming back from injury earlier in November, her successful penalty kick against Aston Villa gave Everton a 2–1 win in one of her last games with the club.

=== Chelsea ===
On 10 January 2024, Björn signed for Chelsea in a three-and-a-half-year deal as the club's first signing of the year. She made her debut for the club on 14 January in the 3–1 FA Cup victory against West Ham, coming on as a substitute for Jess Carter in the 59th minute. She made her first start for the team the following week, playing a full 90 minutes and assisting a goal in the 3–1 win over Manchester United. On 3 March, she opened scoring in the 4–0 victory against Leicester City in the 38th minute, her first goal for Chelsea. On 18 May, she started and helped Chelsea to keep a clean sheet in a 0–6 win against Manchester United at Old Trafford on the final day of the season as the club clinched a 5th consecutive WSL title on goal difference ahead of Manchester City. It was Björn's 1st trophy as a Chelsea player.

On 18 December 2025, Björn was awarded the Diamond Ball Award. On the same day, Chelsea announced that she had suffered a hamstring injury during training and would be sidelined for ‘‘a period of time.’’ In January 2026, head coach Sonia Bompastor confirmed that Björn would be out until after the international break at the end of February. On 15 March, Björn made her return from injury as a second-half substitute during Chelsea's League Cup victory over Manchester United. Just minutes after being brought on, Björn suffered an injury to her calf. Days later, Bompastor stated that she thought it was ‘‘unlikely’’ for Björn to return for the rest of the season. In April, speaking to SVT Sport, Björn described her re-injury as a ‘‘freak accident’’, and expressed the mental difficulty she faced in her recovery.

In July 2026, Björn was named to Chelsea's travelling squad for their pre-season tour of New Zealand and Australia and appearance in the 2026 A-Leagues All Stars Women game. However, she was not included in the final squad who travelled on 2 August.

== International career ==
=== Youth ===
Björn went through the Swedish junior national teams. She was runner-up with the U17 team in the 2013 European Championship. In the first match of the 2015 U19 European Championship, she opened the scoring in the 3–0 win against Israel, and her team ultimately won the title. She then took part in the first qualifying round for the 2016 U19 European Championship, which Sweden successfully completed with three wins. However, she did not play in the elite round in April 2016, in which Sweden were eliminated.

=== Senior ===
On 21 October 2016, she made her first appearance in the senior national team. In the 7–0 win against Iran, who were playing in Europe for the first time, she was in the starting line-up and was one of only three players not substituted. Three days later she played in her second senior international match in a goalless draw against Norway, but was only substituted on four minutes before the end of the game. After several games as captain with the U-23 team in 2018, she was back in the starting line-up on 9 October 2018 in the 0–1 away defeat against Italy. She came on as a substitute after an hour in the 2–0 win against England at the end of the international season. She played over 90 minutes in the 1–2 defeat against Portugal in the 2019 Algarve Cup, where she scored her first international goal.

On 16 May, she was nominated for the 2019 World Cup. At the World Cup she was used for the first time in the group final against the USA and played over 90 minutes. Sweden lost 2–0, but moved into the round of 16 as second in the group, where she came on as a substitute against Canada in the 79th minute. In the quarterfinals, Sweden won a competitive game against Germany again after 24 years and thus qualified for the 2020 Olympic Games. Björn came on as a substitute four minutes before the end of the game. In the semi-finals they lost to European champions Netherlands after extra time, but then won the game for third place against England, in which she was back in the starting line-up and substituted after 72 minutes.

She was also nominated for the 2020 Olympics, which were postponed by a year due to the COVID-19 pandemic. During the games she was used in all of her team's games, coming on as a substitute twice in the second half. In the final penalty shootout against Canada, she was the first Swede to be successful, but Sweden won the silver medal, as in 2016.

In the successful qualification for the 2023 World Cup, she was used in five games, but only came on as a substitute in stoppage time in the first game. She was unable to take part in the games in November 2021. At the Euro 2022 finals in England, which was also postponed by a year due to the COVID-19 pandemic, she was used in her team's five games. With a 4–0 defeat against hosts England, Sweden were eliminated in the semi-finals.

On 13 June 2023, she was included in the 23-player squad for the 2023 World Cup. She played in six of her team's seven games, only resting along with some other regular players in the third group game; otherwise she did not miss a minute. Due to a 1–2 defeat in the semifinals against eventual champions Spain, she and her team missed the final. She won the bronze medal with a 2–0 victory over Australia in the game for third place.

== Personal life ==
Björn is in a relationship with Italian women's footballer Aurora Galli. The couple became engaged in July 2026.

== Career statistics ==
=== International ===
As of match played 13 October 2026

Appearances and goals by national team and year
National team	Year	Apps	Goals
Sweden	2016	2	0
Sweden	2018	2	0
Sweden	2019	13	3
Sweden	2020	5	0
Sweden	2021	12	1
Sweden	2022	12	0
Sweden	2023	15	2
Sweden	2024	8	0
Sweden	2025	13	0
Sweden	2026	2	1
Total		84	7

Scores and results list Sweden's goal tally first, score column indicates score after each Björn goal.

List of international goals scored by Nathalie Björn
No.	Date	Venue	Opponent	Score	Result	Competition	Ref.
1	1 March 2019	Albufeira Municipal Stadium, Albufeira, Portugal	Portugal	1–0	1–2	2019 Algarve Cup	
2	9 April 2019	Motion invest Arena, Maria Enzersdorf, Austria	Austria	2–0	2–0	Friendly	
3	8 October 2019	Gamla Ullevi, Gothenburg, Sweden	Slovakia	4–0	7–0	Euro 2022 qualifying	
4	23 February 2021	Hibernians Stadium, Paola, Malta	Malta	3–0	3–0	Friendly	
5	16 February 2023	Marbella Football Center, Marbella, Spain	China	4–1	4–1	Friendly	
6	11 April 2023	Gamla Ullevi, Gothenburg, Sweden	Norway	2–2	3–3	Friendly	
7	13 October 2026	Nationalarenan, Solna, Sweden	Lithuania	1–0	10–0	2027 FIFA Women's World Cup play-offs	

== Honours ==
FC Rosengård

- Damallsvenskan: 2019
- Svenska Cupen: 2017–18

Chelsea

- Women's Super League: 2023–24, 2024–25
- Women's FA Cup: 2024–25
- FA Women's League Cup: 2024–25, 2025–26

Sweden U19

- UEFA Under-19 Championship: 2015

Sweden U17

- UEFA Under-17 Championship runner-up: 2013
