= Olivia Schough =

Swedish footballer (born 1991)

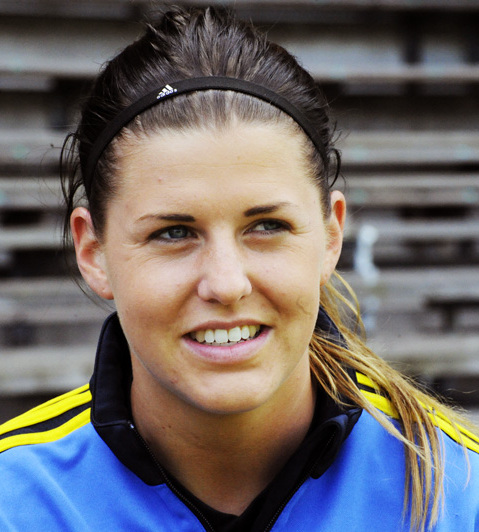
- Schough in 2013

Personal information
- Full name: Olivia Alma Charlotta Schough
- Date of birth: 11 March 1991 (age 35)
- Place of birth: Hylte, Sweden
- Height: 1.72 m (5 ft 8 in)
- Positions: Midfielder; forward

Team information
- Current team: Inter Milan
- Number: 22

Youth career
- Torup/Rydö FF
- Ullareds IK

Senior career*
| Years | Team | Apps | (Gls) |
| 2007–2008 | Falkenbergs FF | | |
| 2009–2013 | Göteborg FC | 92 | (8) |
| 2014 | Bayern Munich | 6 | (0) |
| 2014 | WFC Rossiyanka | 10 | (0) |
| 2014–2017 | Eskilstuna United | 74 | (22) |
| 2018 | Göteborg FC | 20 | (4) |
| 2019–2020 | Djurgårdens IF | 42 | (10) |
| 2021–2024 | FC Rosengård | 37 | (21) |
| 2025– | Inter Milan | 0 | (0) |

International career^{‡}
| 2007–2008 | Sweden U17 | 9 | (2) |
| 2009–2010 | Sweden U19 | 29 | (7) |
| 2010–2012 | Sweden U23 | 14 | (2) |
| 2013– | Sweden | 106 | (13) |
Medal record
Women's soccer
Representing Sweden
Olympic Games
| Silver medal – second place | 2016 Rio de Janeiro | Team |
| Silver medal – second place | 2020 Tokyo | Team |
FIFA Women's World Cup
| Bronze medal – third place | 2019 France | Team |
- * Club domestic league appearances and goals as of 16 March 2019 ‡ National team caps and goals as of 24 July 2023

Olivia Alma Charlotta Schough (pronounced [ˈskuːɡ]; born 11 March 1991) is a Swedish footballer who plays as a midfielder for Serie A club Inter Milan and the Sweden women's national team.

== Club career ==
Schough played for Kopparbergs/Göteborg FC from 2009 to 2013. During that span she won the Svenska Cupen in 2011 and 2012 and the Svenska Supercupen in 2013. She also appeared in the UEFA Women's Champions League in 2011–12 and 2012–13 with Göteborg. In 2013, Göteborg reached the Quarter-finals of the Champions League but were eliminated by Juvisy.

In December 2013 Schough announced her transfer from Göteborg to Bayern Munich. She left Bayern in the summer of 2014 and played for the Russian team WFC Rossiyanka in the fall. In November 2014 she returned to Sweden and signed with Eskilstuna United. In 2015, Eskilstuna finished second in the Damallsvenskan and secured their spot in the Champions League. They defeated Glasgow City in the Round of 32, but were knocked out by Wolfsburg in the Round of 16.

On 5 January 2018, it was announced that Schough was returning to Kopparbergs/Göteborg FC where she had previously played for five years.

After the 2018 season Schough and Göteborg were unable to come to an agreement on a contract extension. Schough then signed with Djurgården for the 2019 Damallsvenskan season.

== International career ==
As an under-19 international she played the 2009 U-19 European Championship, where Sweden won a silver, and the 2010 U-20 World Cup.

Schough was called into the senior national team by coach Pia Sundhage for the 2013 Algarve Cup. She made her debut at the tournament in a 1–1 draw with China. Sundhage also selected Schough for UEFA Women's Euro 2013, which Sweden hosted.

In May 2015, Schough and Eskilstuna teammates Malin Diaz and Sara Thunebro were named in Sundhage's Sweden squad for the 2015 FIFA Women's World Cup in Canada.

Schough was named to Sweden's roster for the 2016 Summer Olympics, she appeared in all six games for Sweden, winning the silver medal.

In June 2017, Schough was named in Sweden's squad for the UEFA Women's Euro 2017. She played in three matches for Sweden, who were eliminated by the Netherlands in the Quarterfinals.

On 13 June 2023, she was included in the 23-player squad for the FIFA Women's World Cup 2023.

== Career statistics ==
=== International ===
Key (expand for notes on "international goals" and sorting)
| Location | Geographic location of the venue where the competition occurred Sorted by country name first, then by city name |
| Lineup | Start – played entire match on minute (off player) – substituted on at the minute indicated, and player was substituted off at the same time off minute (on player) – substituted off at the minute indicated, and player was substituted on at the same time (c) – captain Sorted by minutes played |
| # | NumberOfGoals.goalNumber scored by the player in the match (alternate notation to Goal in match) |
| Min | The minute in the match the goal was scored. For list that include caps, blank indicates played in the match but did not score a goal. |
| Assist/pass | The ball was passed by the player, which assisted in scoring the goal. This column depends on the availability and source of this information. |
| penalty or pk | Goal scored on penalty-kick which was awarded due to foul by opponent. (Goals scored in penalty-shoot-out, at the end of a tied match after extra-time, are not included.) |
| Score | The match score after the goal was scored. Sorted by goal difference, then by goal scored by the player's team |
| Result | The final score. Sorted by goal difference in the match, then by goal difference in penalty-shoot-out if it is taken, followed by goal scored by the player's team in the match, then by goal scored in the penalty-shoot-out. For matches with identical final scores, match ending in extra-time without penalty-shoot-out is a tougher match, therefore precede matches that ended in regulation |
| aet | The score at the end of extra-time; the match was tied at the end of 90' regulation |
| pso | Penalty-shoot-out score shown in parentheses; the match was tied at the end of extra-time |
| | Green background color – exhibition or closed door international friendly match |
| | Yellow background color – match at an invitational tournament |
| | Red background color – Olympic women's football qualification match |
| | Light-blue background color – FIFA women's world cup qualification match |
| | Pink background color – Olympic women's football tournament |
| | Blue background color – FIFA women's world cup final tournament |
NOTE: some keys may not apply for a particular football player

Scores and results list Sweden's goal tally first, score column indicates score after each Schough goal.

List of international goals scored by Olivia Schough
| No. | Date | Venue | Opponent | Score | Result | Competition | Ref. |
|---|---|---|---|---|---|---|---|
| 1 | 2014-06-19 | Tórshavn, Faroe Islands | Faroe Islands | 2–0 | 5–0 | 2015 FIFA Women's World Cup qualification | |
| 2 | 2015-09-17 | Orhei, Moldova | Moldova | 1–0 | 3–0 | UEFA Women's Euro 2017 qualifying | |
| 3 | 2015-09-22 | Gothenburg, Sweden | Poland | 2–0 | 3–0 | UEFA Women's Euro 2017 qualifying | |
| 4 | 2016-03-09 | Rotterdam, Netherlands | Netherlands | 1–1 | 1–1 | 2016 Olympic Qualifying Tournament | |
| 5 | 2016-07-21 | Kalmar, Sweden | Japan | 3–0 | 3–0 | Friendly | |
| 6 | 2016-10-21 | Gothenburg, Sweden | Iran | 3–0 | 7–0 | Friendly | |
| 7 | 2016-10-21 | Gothenburg, Sweden | Iran | 5–0 | 7–0 | Friendly | |
| 8 | 2016-10-21 | Gothenburg, Sweden | Iran | 6–0 | 7–0 | Friendly | |
| 9 | 2018-10-04 | Helsingborg, Sweden | Norway | 1–0 | 2–1 | Friendly | |
| 10 | 2020-10-22 | Gothenburg, Sweden | Latvia | 3–0 | 7–0 | UEFA Women's Euro 2022 qualifying | |
| 11 | 2020-10-27 | Gothenburg, Sweden | Iceland | 2–0 | 2–0 | UEFA Women's Euro 2022 qualifying | |
| 12 | 2022-04-07 | Gori, Georgia | Georgia | 15–0 | 15–0 | 2023 FIFA Women's World Cup qualification | |
| 13 | 2023-04-11 | Gothenburg, Sweden | Norway | 3–2 | 3–3 | Friendly | |

=== Matches and goals scored at World Cup & Olympic tournaments ===
| Goal | Match | Date | Location | Opponent | Lineup | Min | Score | Result | Competition |
|---|---|---|---|---|---|---|---|---|---|
Canada 2015 FIFA Women's World Cup
| | 1 | 2015-6-8 | Winnipeg | Nigeria | on 46' (off Asllani) | | | 3–3 D | Group match |
(Brazil) Rio de Janeiro 2016 Women's Olympic Football Tournament
| | 2 | 2016-8-3 | Rio de Janeiro | South Africa | on 76' (off Rolfö) | | | 1–0 W | Group match |
| | 3 | 2016-8-6 | Rio de Janeiro | Brazil | on 64' (off Rolfö) | | | 1–5 L | Group match |
| | 4 | 2016-8-9 | Brasília | China | Start | | | 0–0 D | Group match |
| | 5 | 2016-8-12 | Brasília | United States | on 90' (off Jakobsson) | | | 1–1 (pso 4–3) (W) | Quarter-Final |
| | 6 | 2016-8-16 | Rio de Janeiro | Brazil | on 104' (off Appelqvist) | | | 0–0 (pso 4–3) (W) | Semi-Final |
| | 7 | 2016-8-19 | Rio de Janeiro | Germany | Start | | | 1–2 L | Gold Medal Match |
France 2019 FIFA Women's World Cup
| | 8 | 2019-6-16 | Nice | Thailand | on 69' (off Seger) | | | 5–1 W | Group match |
| | 9 | 2019-6-20 | Le Havre | United States | off 56' (on Rolfö) | | | 0–2 L | Group match |

=== Matches and goals scored at European Championship tournaments ===
| Goal | Match | Date | Location | Opponent | Lineup | Min | Score | Result | Competition |
|---|---|---|---|---|---|---|---|---|---|
(Sweden) 2013 European Championship
| | 1 | 2013-7-16 | Halmstad | Italy | on 79' (off Thunebro) | | | 3–1 W | Group match |
(Netherlands) 2017 European Championship
| | 2 | 2017-7-17 | Breda | Germany | off 56' (on Rubensson) | | | 0–0 D | Group match |
| | 3 | 2017-7-21 | Deventer | Russia | off 46' (on Rolfö) | | | 2–0 W | Group match |
| | 4 | 2017-7-25 | Doetinchem | Italy | off 79' (on Spetsmark) | | | 2–3 L | Group match |

== Honours ==
Kopparbergs/Göteborg FC

- Svenska Cupen: 2011, 2012
- Svenska Supercupen: 2013

Sweden

- FIFA Women's World Cup third place: 2019
- Summer Olympic Games Silver Medal: 2016, 2020
- Algarve Cup: 2018
