= Hanna Bennison =

Swedish footballer (born 2002)

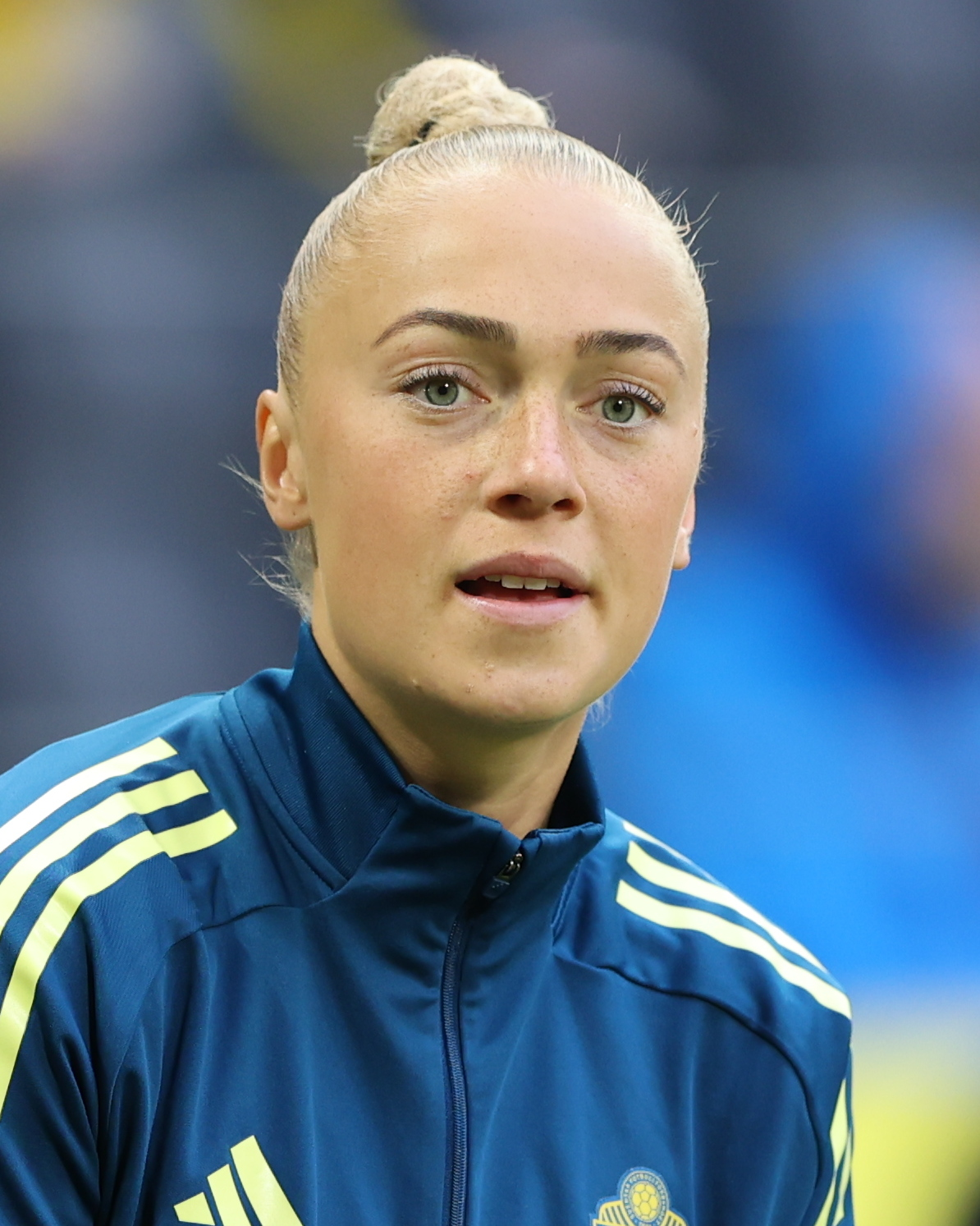
- Bennison with Sweden in 2026

Personal information
- Full name: Hanna Ulrika Bennison
- Date of birth: 16 October 2002 (age 24)
- Place of birth: Lomma, Sweden
- Height: 1.65 m (5 ft 5 in)
- Position: Midfielder

Team information
- Current team: Eintracht Frankfurt
- Number: 8

Youth career
- GIF Nike
- FC Rosengård

Senior career*
Years	Team	Apps	(Gls)
2018–2021	FC Rosengård	48	(8)
2021–2024	Everton	63	(5)
2024–2025	Juventus	23	(1)
2025–2026	Real Madrid	13	(1)
2026–	Eintracht Frankfurt	10	(1)

International career^{‡}
2017–2019	Sweden U17	19	(3)
2019	Sweden U19	2	(1)
2019	Sweden U23	7	(0)
2019–	Sweden	59	(3)
Medal record
Olympic Games
Silver medal – second place	2020 Tokyo	Team
FIFA Women's World Cup
Third place	2023 Australia/New Zealand
- * Club domestic league appearances and goals as of 21 November 2026 ‡ National team caps and goals as of 12 July 2025

Hanna Ulrika Bennison (born 16 October 2002) is a Swedish professional footballer who plays as a midfielder for Frauen-Bundesliga club Eintracht Frankfurt and the Sweden national team. In January 2020 she was named by UEFA as one of the 10 most promising young players in Europe and in March 2021 she won the GOAL NXGN Award as the best young female footballer in the world.

== Club career ==
=== Youth ===
Bennison is from Lomma and joined her local team GIF Nike as a five year old. She later joined the youth system at FC Rosengård.

=== Rosengård ===
In April 2018, 15-year-old Bennison made her Damallsvenskan debut as a substitute against IFK Kalmar. Rosengård won the Swedish Cup that year. She finished the 2018 season with four league appearances.

In September 2018, she made her first appearance in European club competition when she came on as a substitute in the round of 16 of the UEFA Champions League against Ryazan-VDV. In the 2018 season, she scored her first competitive goal in the 2–2 draw against league rivals Kopparbergs/Göteborg FC.

In 2019 Bennison's development accelerated and she played 18 league games, starting in 16, and scoring three goals, as Rosengård won the league title. The club's sporting director Therese Sjögran was surprised by Bennison's rapid progress, and had only expected the youngster to feature in about six league games that season. Despite transfer interest from Lyon, Bennison did not yet want to leave Malmö, since she was still in school.

Bennison was absent much of the 2020 season due to injuries and COVID-19. As she recovered in 2021, she then faced stiff competition for a starting position in the club, mostly from Ria Öling and Olivia Schough.

=== Everton ===
In August 2021, Bennison signed a four-year contract with Everton for a "substantial six-figure sum," making her the club's record signing in terms of transfer fee. She made her debut on September 5 when she came on as a substitute shortly after half-time in the 4–0 defeat against Manchester City. She scored her first goal for the Toffees on September 25 when she scored to make it 2–1 against Birmingham City. Over the course of the season she established herself as a regular player, appearing in each of the 22 league games, ten of them from the start, and thus made a significant contribution to Everton staying in the league. Her achievements in a difficult debut season, which was characterized, among other things, by two coaching changes, were recognized by the club by awarding Bennison the prize for the best young player.

Near the end of the 2022–23 season, Bennison scored the winner in the 91st minute of the 2–1 match against Brighton, ensuring her team finished in a top six spot in the league, an improvement from the 10th place finish the previous season.

=== Juventus ===
On 3 July 2024, Bennison signed a 3-year contract with Juventus.

=== Real Madrid ===
On 2 July 2025, Bennison signed for Spanish club Real Madrid on a three-year deal until 30 June 2028.

=== Eintracht Frankfurt ===
On 6 July 2026, it was announced that Bennsion signed a three-year contract with Frauen-Bundesliga club Eintracht Frankfurt until 30 June 2029.

== International career ==
On 7 November 2019 Bennison made her senior Sweden debut, in a 3–2 friendly defeat by the United States in Columbus, Ohio. Her chipped pass in the build up to Sweden's first goal was hailed as "something special" by television color commentator Aly Wagner.

National team coach Peter Gerhardsson kept Bennison in the squad for the 2020 Algarve Cup, where she started her first match for the Blågult in a 1–0 defeat by Germany. In Portugal Caroline Seger, a teammate with club and country, acknowledged Bennison's great potential but also tried to temper the burgeoning hype: "[She] is a 17-year-old girl so it is important to be careful with her."

FC Rosengård coach Jonas Eidevall noted in an interview in May 2021 that Peter Gerhardsson has a different philosophy than Pia Sundhage and Thomas Dennerby. The earlier national team coaches pretty much excluded players who didn't always start in their club. Gerhardsson doesn't think so, something Eidevall expressed relief over and referenced him saying that he (Gerhardsson) can only start with eleven players and need good substitutions too. Eidevall believes it could be favourable for Hanna Bennison to prove herself as a good substitute player as well, as it would give her a wider repertoire and more possibilities.

On 13 June 2023, she was included in the 23-player squad for the 2023 FIFA Women's World Cup. She played in four of seven games. She played over 90 minutes in the third group game against Argentina when some regular players were rested. She came on as a substitute in the other three games. Due to a 1–2 semi-final defeat against the Spanish, her team missed the final, but was able to win the game for third place against Australia.

== International goals ==
No.	Date	Venue	Opponent	Score	Result	Competition
1.	13 July 2022	Bramall Lane, Sheffield, England	Switzerland	2–1	2–1	UEFA Women's Euro 2022
2.	28 November 2024	Dubočica Stadium, Leskovac, Serbia	Serbia	1–0	2–0	UEFA Women's Euro 2025 qualifying play-offs
3.	3 December 2024	Tele2 Arena, Stockholm, Sweden	Serbia	5–0	6–0	UEFA Women's Euro 2025 qualifying play-offs

== Honours ==
Individual

- IFFHS World's Best Youth (U20) Player: 2021
