= Salima Mukansanga =

Rwandan football referee

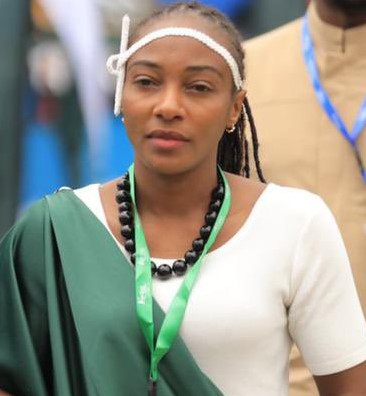
- Full name: Salima Mukansanga
- Born: 25 July 1988 (age 38); Rwanda

International
Years	League	Role
2012-	FIFA listed	Referee

Salima Mukansanga (born 1988) is an international football referee from Rwanda who is a listed international referee for FIFA since 2012. She was an official at the 2019 FIFA Women's World Cup in France.

== Early life ==
Mukansanga initially was involved in basketball but took up a career in football after being told that she was too young to join the national under-17 basketball squad. She approached the Rwanda Football Federation about joining a refereeing course after finishing secondary school but this was declined on the basis of her being too young again. She would later be allowed to take up a course with them after learning the laws of football herself in her own time. Mukansanga went on to graduate with a degree in nursing and midwifery from the University of Gitwe.

At the start of her career, Mukansanga officiated men's local amateur football matches and women's national second division matches in Rwanda.

== Career ==
In 2022, Mukansanga became the first woman to referee at the African Cup of Nations, leading an all-woman officiating team of Fatiha Jermoumi (Morocco), Carine Atemzabong (Cameroon), and Bouchra Karboubi (Morocco) as the VAR. She has officiated at the Olympics, FIFA Women's World Cup, Africa Women Cup of Nations and CAF Women's Champions League. In 2022 she was one of three women referees selected to officiate at the FIFA World Cup to be hosted in Qatar. Mukansanga became the first female African to officiate at the men's top football event on 22 November 2022. She was the fourth official when France, the defending champions, defeated Australia 4–1. She was recognized as one of the BBC 100 Women in December 2022.

On 9 January 2023, FIFA appointed her to the officiating pool for the 2023 FIFA Women's World Cup in Australia and New Zealand.
