= Peter Gerhardsson =

Swedish footballer and manager (born 1959)

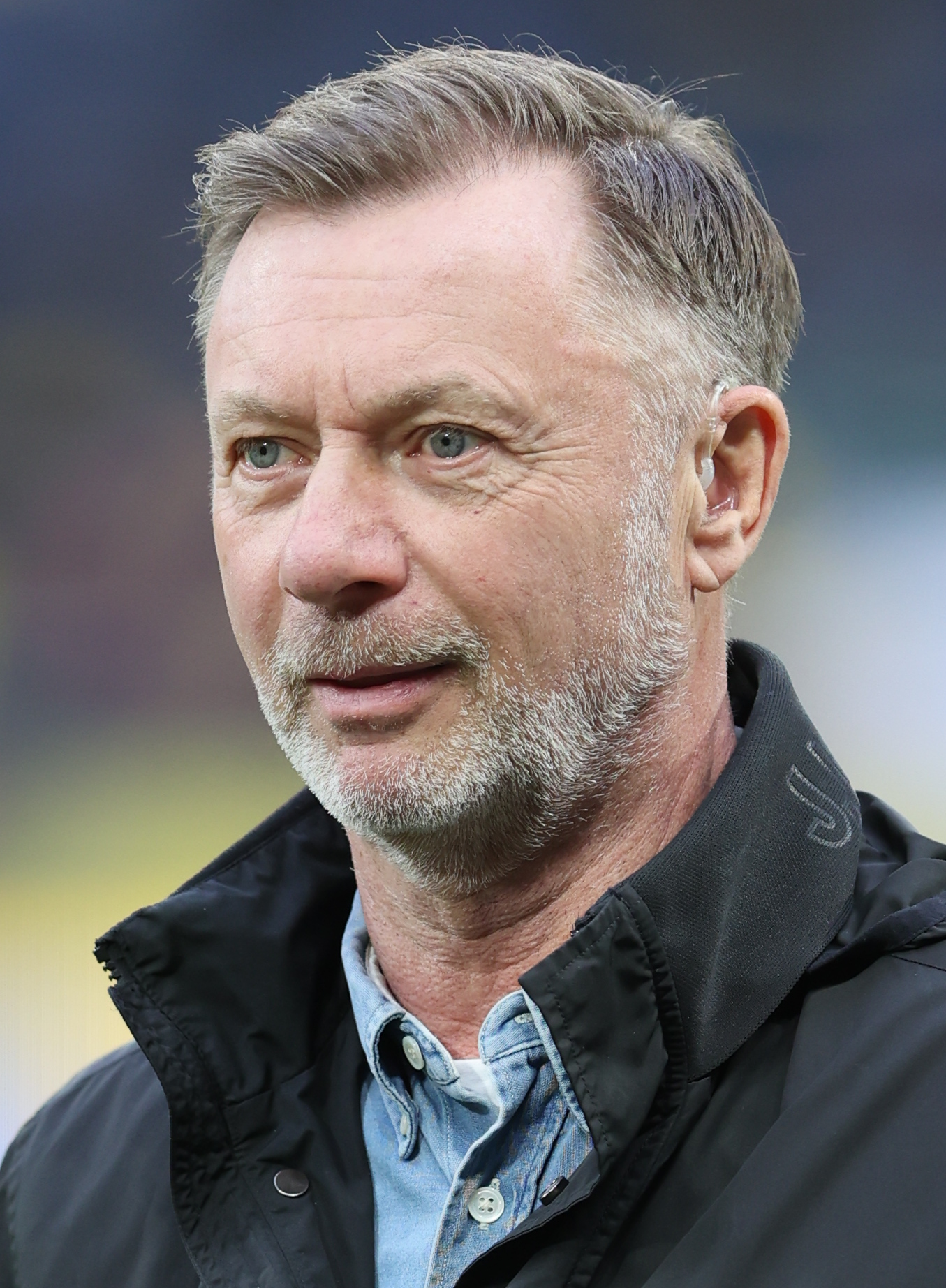
- Gerhardsson in 2026

Personal information
- Full name: Kurt Peter Gerhardsson
- Date of birth: 22 August 1959 (age 67)
- Place of birth: Uppsala, Sweden
- Position: Forward

Youth career
- 1967–1977: Upsala IF
- 1978–: Hammarby IF

Senior career*
Years	Team	Apps	(Gls)
–1977	Upsala IF		
1978–1987	Hammarby IF	152	(49)
1988–1990	Vasalunds IF	71	(21)
1991–1992	Enköpings SK		
Total		223	(70)

International career
1976	Sweden U16	2	(1)
1976–1977	Sweden U18	17	(2)
1986	Sweden Olympic	3	(0)

Managerial career
- 1993–1995: Upsala IF
- 1996: BKV Norrtälje
- 1997–1998: Bälinge IF
- 2000–2002: Enköpings SK (assistant coach)
- 2002–2004: Sweden U17
- 2005–2008: Helsingborgs IF (assistant coach)
- 2009–2016: BK Häcken
- 2017–2025: Sweden Women
- * Club domestic league appearances and goals

Kurt Peter Gerhardsson (born 22 August 1959) is a Swedish football manager and former football player. He was previously the manager of BK Häcken. Before the start of the 2013 Allsvenskan, he was ranked as the best manager in the league by newspaper Aftonbladet.

Gerhardsson became the manager of the Swedish women's national team in 2017, replacing Pia Sundhage after the UEFA Women's Euro 2017. He led the team to third-place finishes in the FIFA Women's World Cup in 2019 and 2023.

== Managerial career ==
With Gerhardsson as manager, the Sweden women's national football team has twice finished third place in the FIFA Women's World Cup, first in 2019 and then in 2023.

== Honours ==
=== Manager ===
==== BK Häcken ====
- Swedish Cup: 2015–16

==== Sweden ====
- FIFA Women's World Cup third place: 2019, 2023
- Summer Olympic silver medalist: 2020
