= Jonna Andersson =

Swedish footballer (born 1993)

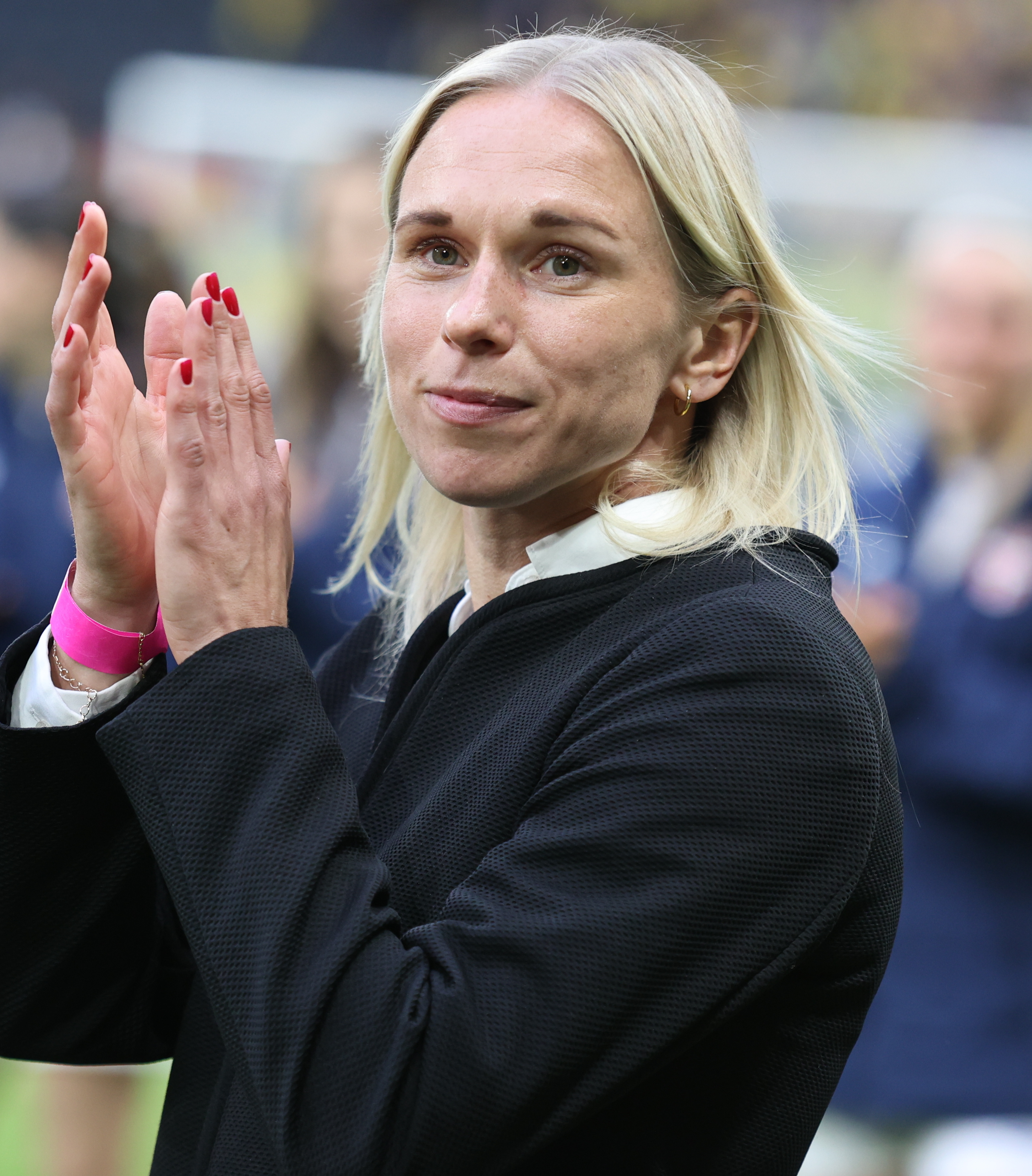
- Andersson in 2026

Personal information
- Full name: Jonna Ann-Charlotte Andersson
- Date of birth: 2 January 1993 (age 33)
- Place of birth: Mjölby, Sweden
- Height: 1.67 m (5 ft 6 in)
- Position: Defender

Team information
- Current team: Linköpings FC
- Number: 25

Youth career
- Mjölby AI FF

Senior career*
Years	Team	Apps	(Gls)
2009–2017	Linköpings FC	158	(16)
2018–2022	Chelsea	82	(4)
2022–2024	Hammarby IF	63	(3)
2025–	Linköpings FC	36	(1)

International career
2008–2010	Sweden U17	20	(12)
2010–2012	Sweden U19	29	(3)
2013–2015	Sweden U23	15	(2)
2016–2025	Sweden	112	(3)
Medal record
Women's football
Representing Sweden
Olympic Games
Silver medal – second place	2016 Rio de Janeiro	Team
Silver medal – second place	2020 Tokyo	Team
FIFA Women's World Cup
Bronze medal – third place	2019 France
Bronze medal – third place	2023 Australia/New Zealand
- * Club domestic league appearances and goals as of 9 October 2026

Jonna Ann-Charlotte Andersson (born 2 January 1993) is a Swedish professional footballer who plays as a defender for Elitettan club Linköpings FC. She recorded 112 caps for the Sweden national team, earning two Olympic silver medals and two FIFA Women's World Cup bronze medals.

== Club career ==
Andersson joined Linköpings FC in 2009 and made two league appearances in her first season as the club won the Damallsvenskan title. After three seasons where she was mainly a substitute, she became an important starting player of the team in the 2013 season.

In December 2017, Andersson joined the FA WSL side Chelsea. In 2019, she renewed her contract until 2022. With Chelsea, Andersson won three consecutive Women's Super League titles, in 2019–20, 2020–21 and 2021–22. The 2020 WSL title was given to Chelsea on a points per game basis after the league was stopped due to the COVID-19 pandemic.

On 5 April 2022, Andersson confirmed she would return to Damallsvenskan, signing a two-and-a-half-year contract with Hammarby IF. The transfer came to effect in August when the Swedish transfer window opened.

In November 2024, she signed a three-year contract with Linköpings FC, returning to the club where she began her professional career.

== International career ==
As a Sweden under-19 international, Andersson featured at the 2012 UEFA Women's Under-19 Championship in Turkey. Sweden won the tournament by beating Spain 1–0 in the final after extra time.

Senior team coach Pia Sundhage called up Andersson for the first time in January 2016 for a friendly against Scotland, as a replacement for Amanda Ilestedt who had a back injury. She played at left-back as the Scots were defeated 6–0 at Prioritet Serneke Arena. Andersson retained her place in the squad for the 2016 UEFA Women's Olympic Qualifying Tournament.

On 13 June 2023, she was included in Sweden's 23-player squad for the 2023 FIFA Women's World Cup.

In February 2026, Andersson announced her retirement from international play. She had scored 3 goals across 112 senior international matches.

== Career statistics ==
=== International ===
Scores and results list Sweden's goal tally first, score column indicates score after each Andersson goal.

List of international goals scored by Jonna Andersson
No.	Date	Venue	Opponent	Score	Result	Competition
1	1 December 2020	Anton Malatinský Stadium, Trnava, Slovakia	Slovakia	4–0	6–0	UEFA Women's Euro 2022 qualifying
2	7 April 2022	Tengiz Burjanadze Stadium, Gori, Georgia	Georgia	7–0	15–0	2023 FIFA Women's World Cup qualification
3	9 July 2022	Bramall Lane, Sheffield, England	Netherlands	1–0	1–1	UEFA Women's Euro 2022

== Honours ==
Linköpings FC

- Damallsvenskan: 2009, 2016, 2017
- Swedish Cup: 2013–14, 2014–15
- Swedish Supercup: 2010

Chelsea

- FA WSL: 2017–18, 2019–20, 2020–21, 2021–22
- Women's FA Cup: 2017–18, 2020–21, 2021–22
- FA Women's League Cup: 2019–20, 2020–21
- Women's FA Community Shield: 2020

Hammarby IF

- Damallsvenskan: 2023
- Swedish Cup: 2022–23

Sweden U19

- UEFA Women's Under-19 Championship: 2012

Sweden

- Summer Olympic Games silver medal: 2016, 2020
- FIFA Women's World Cup third place: 2019, 2023
