= Fridolina Rolfö =

Swedish footballer (born 1993)

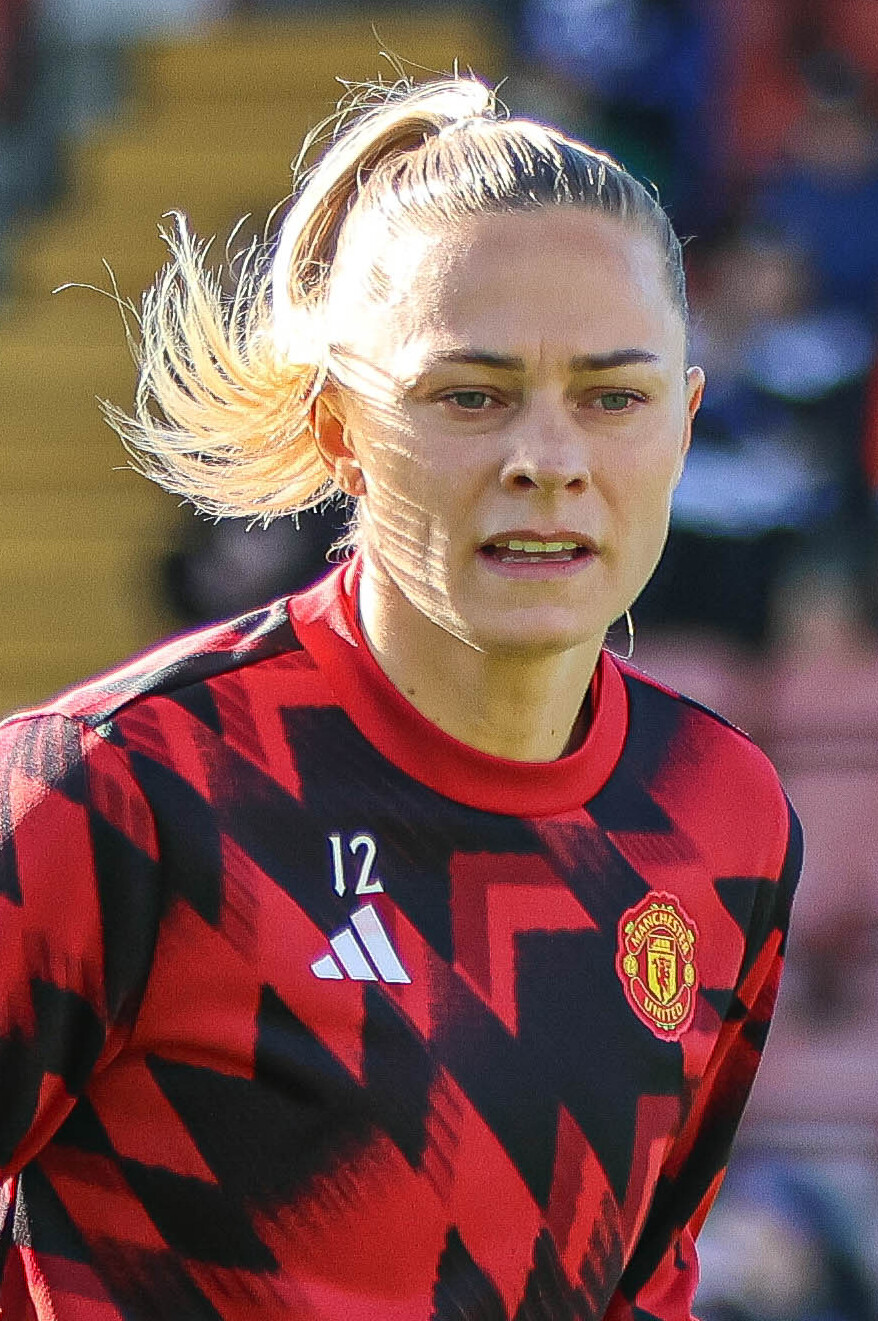
- Rolfö with Manchester United in 2025

Personal information
- Full name: Fridolina Rolfö
- Date of birth: 24 November 1993 (age 32)
- Place of birth: Kungsbacka, Sweden
- Height: 1.78 m (5 ft 10 in)
- Positions: Left-back; left winger

Team information
- Current team: Manchester United
- Number: 12

Youth career
- Fjärås

Senior career*
Years	Team	Apps	(Gls)
2008–2010	Tölö		
2011–2013	Jitex	59	(16)
2014–2016	Linköping	51	(16)
2017–2019	Bayern Munich	40	(18)
2019–2021	VfL Wolfsburg	25	(9)
2021–2025	Barcelona	77	(27)
2025–	Manchester United	19	(3)

International career^{‡}
2011–2012	Sweden U19	26	(8)
2014–	Sweden	110	(34)
Medal record
Women's football
Representing Sweden
Olympic Games
Silver medal – second place	2016 Rio de Janeiro	Team
Silver medal – second place	2020 Tokyo	Team
FIFA Women's World Cup
Bronze medal – third place	2019 France	Team
Bronze medal – third place	2023 Australia–New Zealand	Team
- * Club domestic league appearances and goals as of 00:40, 17 May 2026 (UTC) ‡ National team caps and goals as of 22:08, 24 October 2026 (UTC)

Fridolina Rolfö (born 24 November 1993) is a Swedish professional footballer who primarily plays as a left-back or left winger for Women's Super League club Manchester United and the Sweden national team.

== Early life ==
Fridolina Rolfö was born on 24 November 1993 to mother Eleonore Andersson and father Lars Rolfö. She has a younger brother named Julius and an older sister named Daniella, the latter of whom played football and inspired Rolfö to do the same. She grew up in Kungsbacka, a municipality within Metropolitan Gothenburg.

In her youth, Rolfö played both football and handball, but chose to focus solely on football when she turned 15 years old. The first football team she played for at age 10 was the girls youth section of IFK Fjärås, located in the south of Kungsbacka in the town of Fjärås.

== Club career ==
=== Early career ===
After joining from Tölö, Rolfö scored nine league goals for Jitex in her debut Damallsvenskan season, 2011. Her favoured position was on the right wing, so she could cut inside and shoot with her strong left foot. She scored her first three league goals on 5 May 2011 in a 9–0 away win against newly promoted Dalsjöfors GoIF with a hat trick to make it 1–0, 2–0 and 3–0. She was named the 2011 Women's Junior Player of the Year by Göteborgs-Posten,

Rolfö signed for Linköping in 2014 and scored a hat-trick on her UEFA Champions League debut against English champions Liverpool.

=== Bayern Munich ===
In November 2016, it was announced that Rolfö would sign for reigning Bundesliga champions Bayern Munich. She signed an 18-month contract, starting from 1 January 2017. On 26 February 2017 she made her debut in a 2–1 win in a home game against FF USV Jena, coming on as a substitute for Melanie Leupolz in the 68th minute. She scored her first Bundesliga goal on 1 October 2017 in a 4–0 away win against TSG 1899 Hoffenheim. In each of her three seasons in Germany, Bayern Munich finished runners up to VfL Wolfsburg in the league.

=== VfL Wolfsburg ===
In May 2019, current Bundesliga champions VfL Wolfsburg announced the signing of Rolfö to a two-year contract. On 25 August 2020, Rolfö scored the only goal against Barcelona in their single-legged Champions League semifinal victory to book a place in the final, where her team eventually lost 1–3 to Lyon. On 30 June 2021, Rolfö left VfL Wolfsburg after the expiration of her contract.

=== Barcelona ===
On 7 July 2021, she signed a two-year deal with Barcelona. On 4 September, Rolfö made her official debut for Barcelona when she came on for the last 18 minutes, replacing Mariona Caldentey in her side's 5–0 routing of Granadilla Tenerife. A week later, she scored her first goal for the club, when she slotted her side's fourth goal in another 5–0 victory against Real Betis.

In January 2023, Rolfö extended her contract with Barcelona until June 2026. Rolfö scored the winning goal of the 2022–23 Champions League final, making it 3–2 against her former club VfL Wolfsburg and giving Barcelona their second Champions League title.

On 5 September 2023, Rolfö announced that she would be undergoing keyhole surgery on the meniscus of her right knee. She returned from injury on 17 March 2024, and in her first match back, she opened scoring in the 8th minute for a 7–0 victory against UD Tenerife. Playing both as full-back and winger, and serving as the team's penalty taker, she returned in top form to help Barcelona to Champions League victories at Stamford Bridge and then in the final. On 7 July 2025, her contract with Barcelona was terminated by mutual consent.

=== Manchester United ===
On 15 August 2025, it was announced that Rolfö had signed for English Women's Super League club Manchester United on a two-year deal. She made her debut for the club on 14 September during a 5–1 WSL victory against London City Lionesses. Rolfö scored her first goal for United during their 1–0 Champions League victory against Atlético Madrid on 16 October.

== International career ==
Rolfö played for Sweden under-19 international team at the 2011–12 UEFA Under-19 Championship. She helped Sweden win the competition by defeating Spain 1–0 in extra time.

Rolfö's club form with Linköping caught the eye of national team coach Pia Sundhage, who promptly handed Rolfö a debut cap in Sweden's 2–1 friendly defeat by Germany at Eyravallen on 29 October 2014. In her five-minute substitute appearance she almost scored but was denied by German goalkeeper Nadine Angerer.

Rolfö played in the 2016 Summer Olympics at Rio de Janeiro helping Sweden to a silver medal after losing in the final to Germany. Rolfö did not feature in the 2–1 loss in the Gold Medal Match, after suffering a tournament-ending injury in the quarter-final against the USWNT.

On 16 June 2019, Rolfö scored her first goal in the 2019 World Cup in a 5–1 win over Thailand.

Rolfö was selected to represent Sweden in the 2020 Summer Olympics held in Tokyo in 2021. She featured in every match except for Sweden's final group stage match against New Zealand. She scored three goals in five matches as her team won the silver medal again after being defeated 2–3 on penalties by Canada.

On 13 June 2023, she was included in the 23-player squad for the FIFA 2023 World Cup. She scored the first goal in the 2-0 win over Australia for third place. Two weeks later, she underwent knee surgery to repair her meniscus, and was out for the rest of the year.

On 12 July 2025, she received her 100th cap in a 4–1 victory over Germany at the UEFA Women's Euro 2025.

== Personal life ==
Rolfö is currently in a relationship with Simon Skott, whom she met in 2016. In February 2025, she announced that they had become engaged at some point in the previous year. In September 2026, Rolfö announced that she was pregnant, with the pair expecting their first child in March 2027.

While at Wolfsburg, Rolfö was roommates with fellow national team teammate Madelen Janogy, whom Rolfö helped tackle her mental health challenges.

== Career statistics ==
=== Club ===
As of match played 16 May 2026

Appearances and goals by club, season and competition
Club	Season	League			National cup (Note: Includes Svenska Cupen, DFB-Pokal, Copa de la Reina)		Europe		Other		Total	
Club	Season	Division	Apps	Goals	Apps	Goals	Apps	Goals	Apps	Goals	Apps	Goals
Jitex	2011	Damallsvenskan	21	9	2	0	—		—		23	9
Jitex	2012	Damallsvenskan	16	3	3	0	—		—		19	3
Jitex	2013	Damallsvenskan	22	4	1	0	—		—		23	4
Jitex	Total		59	16	6	0	—		—		65	16
Linköping	2014	Damallsvenskan	20	8	3	0	—		—		23	8
Linköping	2015	Damallsvenskan	18	3	3	1	5	4	0	0	26	8
Linköping	2016	Damallsvenskan	13	5	4	7	—		1 (Note: Appearances in Svenska Supercupen)	1	18	13
Linköping	2017	Damallsvenskan	—		1	0	—		—		1	0
Linköping	Total		51	16	11	8	5	4	1	1	68	29
Bayern Munich	2016–17	Frauen-Bundesliga	5	0	0	0	0	0	—		5	0
Bayern Munich	2017–18	Frauen-Bundesliga	19	9	2	2	2 (Note: Appearances in UEFA Women's Champions League)	1	—		23	12
Bayern Munich	2018–19	Frauen-Bundesliga	16	9	1	1	6	2	—		23	12
Bayern Munich	Total		40	18	3	3	8	3	—		51	24
VfL Wolfsburg	2019–20	Frauen-Bundesliga	11	6	1	0	4	2	—		16	8
VfL Wolfsburg	2020–21	Frauen-Bundesliga	14	3	3	0	5	1	—		22	4
VfL Wolfsburg	Total		25	9	4	0	9	3	—		38	12
Barcelona	2021–22	Primera División	26	9	3	0	11	3	2 (Note: Appearances in Supercopa de España)	1	42	13
Barcelona	2022–23	Liga F	21	8	0	0	11	4	2	0	34	12
Barcelona	2023–24	Liga F	7	5	3	0	5	2	0	0	15	7
Barcelona	2024–25	Liga F	23	5	4	0	9	1	2	0	38	6
Barcelona	Total		77	27	10	0	36	10	6	1	129	38
Manchester United	2025–26	WSL	19	3	0	0	9	3	2 (Note: Appearances in FA Women's League Cup)	1	30	7
Career total			271	89	34	11	67	23	9	3	381	126

=== International ===
As of match played 9 June 2026

Appearances and goals by national team and year
National team	Year	Apps	Goals
Sweden	2014	3	0
Sweden	2015	2	0
Sweden	2016	8	4
Sweden	2017	14	1
Sweden	2018	6	3
Sweden	2019	10	2
Sweden	2020	4	2
Sweden	2021	14	9
Sweden	2022	12	3
Sweden	2023	10	4
Sweden	2024	10	2
Sweden	2025	12	3
Sweden	2026	5	1
Total		110	34

Scores and results list Sweden's goal tally first, score column indicates score after each Rolfö goal.

List of international goals scored by Fridolina Rolfö
No.	Date	Venue	Opponent	Score	Result	Competition
1	2 June 2016	Łódź, Poland	Poland	4–0	4–0	UEFA Euro 2017 qualifying
2	6 June 2016	Gothenburg, Sweden	Moldova	3–0	6–0	UEFA Euro 2017 qualifying
3	6 June 2016	Gothenburg, Sweden	Moldova	5–0	6–0	UEFA Euro 2017 qualifying
4	21 July 2016	Kalmar, Sweden	Japan	2–0	3–0	Friendly
5	8 March 2017	Albufeira, Portugal	Russia	4–0	4–0	2017 Algarve Cup
6	28 February 2018	Parchal, Portugal	Canada	2–1	1–1	2018 Algarve Cup
7	5 March 2018	Parchal, Portugal	Russia	2–0	3–0	2018 Algarve Cup
8	5 March 2018	Parchal, Portugal	Russia	3–0	3–0	2018 Algarve Cup
9	16 June 2019	Nice, France	Thailand	3–0	5–1	2019 FIFA Women's World Cup
10	8 October 2019	Gothenburg, Sweden	Slovakia	7–0	7–0	UEFA Euro 2022 qualifying
11	10 March 2020	Faro/Loulé, Portugal	Portugal	2–0	2–0	2020 Algarve Cup
12	1 December 2020	Trnava, Slovakia	Slovakia	3–0	6–0	UEFA Euro 2022 qualifying
13	19 February 2021	Paola, Malta	Austria	2–1	6–1	Friendly
14	19 February 2021	Paola, Malta	Austria	5–1	6–1	Friendly
15	24 July 2021	Saitama, Japan	Australia	1–0	4–2	2020 Summer Olympics
16	24 July 2021	Saitama, Japan	Australia	3–2	4–2	2020 Summer Olympics
17	2 August 2021	Yokohama, Japan	Australia	1–0	1–0	2020 Summer Olympics
18	17 September 2021	Senec, Slovakia	Slovakia	1–0	1–0	2023 FIFA World Cup qualification
19	26 October 2021	Paisley, Scotland	Scotland	1–0	2–0	Friendly
20	25 November 2021	Gothenburg, Sweden	Finland	1–0	2–1	2023 FIFA World Cup qualification
21	30 November 2021	Malmö, Sweden	Slovakia	2–0	3–0	2023 FIFA World Cup qualification
22	7 April 2022	Gori, Georgia	Georgia	1–0	15–0	2023 FIFA World Cup qualification
23	13 July 2022	Sheffield, England	Switzerland	1–0	2–1	UEFA Euro 2022
24	7 September 2022	Tampere, Finland	Finland	5–0	5–0	2023 FIFA World Cup qualification
25	11 April 2023	Gothenburg, Sweden	Norway	1–0	3–3	Friendly
26	23 July 2023	Wellington, New Zealand	South Africa	1–1	2–1	2023 FIFA Women's World Cup
27	29 July 2023	Wellington, New Zealand	Italy	2–0	5–0	2023 FIFA Women's World Cup
28	19 August 2023	Brisbane, Australia	Australia	1–0	2–0	2023 FIFA Women's World Cup
29	5 April 2024	London, England	England	1–1	1–1	UEFA Euro 2025 qualifying
30	31 May 2024	Dublin, Ireland	Republic of Ireland	2–0	3–0	UEFA Euro 2025 qualifying
31	21 February 2025	Odense, Denmark	Denmark	1–0	2–1	2025 UEFA Women's Nations League A
32	4 April 2025	Solna, Sweden	Italy	3–2	3–2	2025 UEFA Women's Nations League A
33	12 July 2025	Zurich, Switzerland	Germany	3–1	4–1	UEFA Euro 2025
34	9 June 2026	Gothenburg, Sweden	Italy	2–2	2–2	2027 FIFA Women's World Cup qualification

== Honours ==
Linköping

- Damallsvenskan: 2016
- Svenska Cupen: 2013–14, 2014–15

VfL Wolfsburg

- Frauen-Bundesliga: 2019–20
- DFB-Pokal Frauen: 2019–20, 2020–21
- UEFA Women's Champions League runner-up: 2019–20

Barcelona

- Primera División: 2021–22, 2022–23, 2023–24, 2024–25
- Supercopa de España: 2021–22, 2022–23, 2024–25
- Copa de la Reina: 2021–22, 2023–24, 2024–25
- UEFA Women's Champions League: 2022–23, 2023–24, runner-up: 2021–22, 2024–25

Manchester United

- Women's League Cup runner-up: 2025–26

Sweden

- Summer Olympic Games Silver Medal: 2016, 2020
- FIFA Women's World Cup Bronze Medal: 2019, 2023
- Algarve Cup: 2018

Sweden U19

- UEFA Women's Under-19 Championship: 2012

Individual

- Fotbollsgalan Diamantbollen: 2021, 2022
- Fotbollsgalan Swedish Forward of the Year: 2020, 2021, 2022, 2023
- Fotbollsgalan Swedish Goal of the Year: 2021
