= 2026–27 Tottenham Hotspur F.C. Women season =

Tottenham Hotspur
2026–27 season
- Head coach: Martin Ho
- Stadium: Brisbane Road, Leyton
Home colours	Away colours	Third colours

The 2026–27 season was Tottenham Hotspur's eighth season in the top flight of the English football league system and 42nd season in existence. Along with competing in the WSL, the club will also contest two domestic cup competitions: the FA Cup and the League Cup.

== Squad ==
As of 27 August 2026

No.	Player	Nationality	Date of birth (age)	Signed from	Since
Goalkeepers
1	Lize Kop	(Netherlands)	17 March 1998 (age 28)	(England) Leicester City	2025
12	Selma Panengstuen	(Norway)	5 March 2003 (age 23)	(Norway) SK Brann	2026
Defenders
3	Ella Morris	(England)	23 September 2002 (age 24)	(England) Southampton	2024
4	Caitlin Dijkstra	(Netherlands)	30 January 1999 (age 27)	(Germany) VfL Wolfsburg	2026
5	Alice Sombath	(France)	16 October 2003 (age 23)	(France) OL Lyonnes	2026
6	Amanda Nildén	(Sweden)	7 August 1998 (age 28)	(Italy) Juventus	2024
15	Clare Hunt	(Australia)	12 March 1999 (age 27)	(France) Paris Saint-Germain	2024
22	Hanna Wijk	(Sweden)	15 December 2003 (age 22)	(Sweden) BK Häcken	2026
32	Tōko Koga	(Japan)	6 January 2006 (age 20)	(Netherlands) Feyenoord	2025
41	Julie Blakstad	(Norway)	27 August 2001 (age 25)	(Sweden) Hammarby	2026
Midfielders
8	Signe Gaupset	(Norway)	18 June 2005 (age 21)	(Norway) SK Brann	2026
10	Maite Oroz	(Spain)	25 March 1998 (age 28)	(Spain) Real Madrid	2024
11	Olivia Holdt	(Denmark)	7 June 2001 (age 25)	(Sweden) FC Rosengård	2025
20	Olga Ahtinen	(Finland)	15 August 1997 (age 29)	(Sweden) Linköping FC	2023
23	Victoria Pelova	(Netherlands)	7 June 1999 (age 27)	(England) Arsenal	2026
24	Drew Spence (captain)	(Jamaica)	23 October 1992 (age 34)	(England) Chelsea	2022
25	Eveliina Summanen	(Finland)	29 May 1998 (age 28)	(Sweden) Kristianstads DFF	2022
Forwards
7	Jess Naz	(England)	24 September 2000 (age 26)	(England) Arsenal	2018
9	Cathinka Tandberg	(Norway)	18 June 2004 (age 22)	(Sweden) Hammarby	2025
13	Matilda Vinberg	(Sweden)	16 March 2003 (age 23)	(Sweden) Hammarby	2024
14	Matilda Nildén	(Sweden)	10 November 2004 (age 22)	(Sweden) BK Häcken	2026
16	Kirsty Hanson	(Scotland)	17 April 1998 (age 28)	(England) Aston Villa	2026
18	Lenna Gunning-Williams	(England)	5 February 2005 (age 21)	(England) Tottenham Hotspur Academy	2022
19	Shekiera Martinez	(Germany)	4 July 2001 (age 25)	(England) West Ham United	2026
Out on loan
30	Araya Dennis	(England)	11 January 2006 (age 20)	(England) Arsenal	2024

== Transfers ==
=== In ===
Date	Position	Nationality	Name	From	Ref.
1 July 2026	FW	(Germany)	Shekiera Martinez	(England) West Ham United	
1 July 2026	DF	(Netherlands)	Caitlin Dijkstra	(Germany) VfL Wolfsburg	
1 July 2026	FW	(Scotland)	Kirsty Hanson	(England) Aston Villa	
1 July 2026	MF	(Netherlands)	Victoria Pelova	(England) Arsenal	
1 July 2026	GK	(Norway)	Selma Panengstuen	(Norway) SK Brann	
21 July 2026	DF	(France)	Alice Sombath	(France) OL Lyonnes	

=== Out ===
Date	Position	Nationality	Name	To	Ref.
30 June 2026	DF	(England)	Amy James-Turner	Retired	
30 June 2026	DF	(Switzerland)	Luana Bühler	(Switzerland) FC Zürich	
30 June 2026	DF	(Australia)	Charli Grant	(Sweden) Malmö	
30 June 2026	DF	(Sweden)	Josefine Rybrink	(Sweden) Häcken	
30 June 2026	FW	(England)	Bethany England	(England) Crystal Palace	
30 June 2026	GK	(England)	Eleanor Heeps	(England) Brighton & Hove Albion	
29 July 2026	FW	(Scotland)	Martha Thomas	(England) Newcastle United	
3 August 2026	DF	(England)	Molly Bartrip	(England) Crystal Palace	
25 August 2026	MF	(Hungary)	Anna Csiki	(Portugal) Benfica	

=== Loans out ===
Date	Position	Nationality	Name	To	Until	Ref.
25 August 2026	FW	(England)	Araya Dennis	(England) Leicester City	30 June 2027	

== Preseason ==
9 August 2026	Granada	0–1	Tottenham Hotspur	Murcia, Spain
11:00 CEST(BST+01:00)		Report	Gaupset 86'	Stadium: Pinatar Arena

12 August 2026	Real Madrid	2–1	Tottenham Hotspur	Murcia, Spain
20:00 CEST(BST+01:00)	Schröder 22'; Caicedo 25'	Report	Hanson 5'	Stadium: Pinatar Arena

23 August 2026	Tottenham Hotspur	5–3	Birmingham City	Enfield
12:00 BST	Koga 4'; Tandberg 16'; Dijkstra 60'; Holdt 66'; Ahtinen 74'	Report		Stadium: Hotspur Way

30 August 2026	Tottenham Hotspur	5–0	Bristol City	Enfield
14:00 BST	Gaupset 45'; Martinez 68'; Summanen 74'; Blakstad 76'; M. Nildén 89'	Report		Stadium: Hotspur Way

== Women's Super League ==
Win Draw Loss Fixtures

6 September 2026 1	Tottenham Hotspur	3–1	West Ham United	Leyton
12:00 BST	Gaupset 18'; Hanson 30', 74'	Report	Asseyi 90+3'	Stadium: Brisbane Road; Attendance: 1,675; Referee: Abigail Byrne

13 September 2026 2	Liverpool	1–1	Tottenham Hotspur	St Helens
14:00 BST	Csillag 59'	Report	Kerr 41' (o.g.); Summanen (yellow card) 57'; Blakstad (yellow card) 65'	Stadium: St Helens Stadium; Referee: Adewunmi Soneye

20 September 2026 3	Crystal Palace	0–7	Tottenham Hotspur	Selhurst
14:00 BST	Tsunoda (red card) 7'	Report	Hanson (yellow card) 27'; Holdt 49', 61', 73'; Pelova 76', 90'; Martinez 79'; Nildén 86'	Stadium: Selhurst Park; Referee: Sophie Dennington

27 September 2026 4	Tottenham Hotspur	4–0	Aston Villa	Leyton
14:00 BST	Pelova 54', 73'; Dijkstra 81'; Tandberg 88'	Report		Stadium: Brisbane Road; Referee: Lisa Benn

4 October 2026 5	Tottenham Hotspur	1–6	London City Lionesses	Leyton
12:00 BST	Pelova 54'; Gaupset (yellow card) 69'	Report	Putellas 3', 34'; Diani 22', 74'; van de Donk 52'; Cascarino 90+4'	Stadium: Brisbane Road; Attendance: 2,377; Referee: Megan Wilson

18 October 2026 6	Chelsea	6–2	Tottenham Hotspur	Fulham
14:00 BST	James 25', 62'; Carpenter 58', 90+1'; Nüsken 67'; Cuthbert (yellow card) 82'; Hamano 86'	Report	A. Nildén (yellow card) 18'; Vinberg 41'; Pelova (yellow card) 55'; Gaupset 87'; Koga (yellow card) 90+5'	Stadium: Stamford Bridge; Attendance: 7,814; Referee: Kirsty Dowle

25 October 2026 7	Tottenham Hotspur	1–2	Arsenal	Tottenham
14:00 GMT	Tandberg 13'; Koga (yellow card) 26'; Summanen (yellow card) 43'; Dijkstra (yellow card) 58'; Gaupset (yellow card) 90+7'	Report	Stanway 17', (yellow card) 66'; Russo 56' (pen.); Cooney-Cross (yellow card) 77'	Stadium: Tottenham Hotspur Stadium; Referee: Phoebe Cross

1 November 2026 8	Birmingham City	1–4	Tottenham Hotspur	Bordesley
14:00 GMT	Hurtré (yellow card) 36'; Naalsund (yellow card) 49'; Herron 64'	Report	Vinberg (yellow card) 30'; Blakstad 37'; Pelova (yellow card) 45', (goal) 84'; Holdt 50'; Gaupset 53'; Dijkstra (yellow card) 69'	Stadium: St Andrew's; Referee: Kirsty Dowle

8 November 2026 9	Tottenham Hotspur	2–1	Brighton & Hove Albion	Leyton
14:00 GMT	Gaupset 52'; Holdt 53'	Report	Kirby 2'	Stadium: Brisbane Road; Attendance: 1,170; Referee: Melissa Burgin

14 November 2026 10	Tottenham Hotspur	0–0	Everton	Leyton
15:00 GMT	Blakstad (yellow card) 33'; Spence (yellow card) 71'		Mace (yellow card) 53'	Stadium: Brisbane Road; Attendance: 1,256; Referee: Emily Heaslip

22 November 2026 11	Manchester City	1–3	Tottenham Hotspur	Manchester
14:00 GMT	Shaw 10'; Coffey (yellow card) 90+2'	Report	Blakstad (yellow card) 8'; Dijkstra (yellow card) 27'; Tandberg 40'; Spence (yellow card) 52'; Vinberg 74'; Naz 79'; Summanen (yellow card) 90+1'	Stadium: Academy Stadium; Referee: Abigail Byrne

13 December 2026 12	Tottenham Hotspur	v	Charlton Athletic	Leyton
14:00 GMT				Stadium: Brisbane Road

20 December 2026 13	Manchester United	v	Tottenham Hotspur	Leigh
13:00 GMT				Stadium: Leigh Sports Village

10 January 2027 14	Tottenham Hotspur	v	Liverpool	Leyton
14:00 GMT				Stadium: Brisbane Road

20 January 2027 15	Brighton & Hove Albion	v	Tottenham Hotspur	Crawley
19:45 GMT				Stadium: Broadfield Stadium capacity of

24 January 2027 16	Aston Villa	v	Tottenham Hotspur	Aston
14:00 GMT				Stadium: Villa Park

31 January 2027 17	Tottenham Hotspur	v	Chelsea	Leyton
14:00 GMT				Stadium: Brisbane Road

7 February 2027 18	Tottenham Hotspur	v	Manchester United	Tottenham
14:00 GMT				Stadium: Tottenham Hotspur Stadium

14 February 2027 19	Everton	v	Tottenham Hotspur	Liverpool
14:00 GMT				Stadium: Goodison Park

13 March 2027 20	Arsenal	v	Tottenham Hotspur	Holloway
17:30 GMT				Stadium: Emirates Stadium

17 March 2027 21	Tottenham Hotspur	v	Manchester City	Leyton
19:30 GMT				Stadium: Brisbane Road

28 March 2027 22	West Ham United	v	Tottenham Hotspur	Dagenham
14:00 BST				Stadium: Victoria Road

4 April 2027 23	Tottenham Hotspur	v	Crystal Palace	Tottenham
14:00 BST				Stadium: Tottenham Hotspur Stadium

2 May 2027 24	London City Lionesses	v	Tottenham Hotspur	Bromley
14:00 BST				Stadium: Hayes Lane

9 May 2027 25	Charlton Athletic	v	Tottenham Hotspur	Charlton
14:00 BST				Stadium: The Valley

22 May 2027 TBC 26	Tottenham Hotspur	v	Birmingham City	Leyton
TBC				Stadium: Brisbane Road

(Clocks move to GMT on the last Sunday of October. For 2026, this is on Sunday, 25 October 2026 at 2:00 AM. They will move forward one hour in 2027 on Sunday, 28 March at 1:00 am, moving to BST.)

=== League table ===
Pos	Team	Pld	W	D	L	GF	GA	GD	Pts	Qualification or relegation
3	London City Lionesses	11	7	2	2	31	14	+17	23	Qualification for the Champions League third qualifying round
4	Manchester United	10	5	3	2	12	11	+1	18	
5	Tottenham Hotspur	10	5	2	3	25	18	+7	17	
6	Arsenal	10	3	5	2	11	11	0	14	
7	Aston Villa	10	3	4	3	11	16	−5	13	

Updated to match(es) played on 21 November 2026. Source: Women's Super League Table
Rules for classification: 1) Points; 2) Goal difference; 3) Number of goals scored.

== WSL Players Cup ==
=== League table ===
Pos	Grp	Team	Pld	W	PW	PL	L	GF	GA	GD	Pts	Qualification
4	NR	Liverpool	5	4	0	0	1	19	12	+7	12	Advance to Knockout Phase
5	SR	London City Lionesses	5	4	0	0	1	9	4	+5	12	Advance to Knockout Phase
6	SR	Tottenham Hotspur	5	3	0	2	0	15	2	+13	11	Advance to Knockout Phase
7	SR	West Ham United	5	3	1	0	1	9	4	+5	11	Advance to Knockout Phase
8	NR	Aston Villa	5	3	1	0	1	9	6	+3	11	Advance to Knockout Phase

Updated to match(es) played on 18 November 2026. Source: WSL Football
Rules for classification: 1) Points; 2) Goal difference; 3) Number of goals scored; 4) Number of wins; 5) Head-to-head record

Following the competition's restructuring, Tottenham Hotspur were drawn in the Southern Region for the league stage of the competition.

Win Draw Loss Fixtures

23 September 2026	Tottenham Hotspur	0–0 (3–4 p)	West Ham United	Leyton
19:00 BST		Report		Stadium: BetWright Stadium; Attendance: 746; Referee: Amy Fearn
	Penalties
	Spence (penalty scored); Dijkstra (penalty missed); Gaupset (penalty scored); Pelova (penalty scored); Martinez (penalty missed)		(penalty scored) Zelem; (penalty scored) Nyström; (penalty scored) Gago; (penalty scored) Codina; (penalty missed) Salmon

30 September 2026	Brighton & Hove Albion	v	Tottenham Hotspur	Crawley
19:45 BST		Report		Stadium: Broadfield Stadium

28 October 2026	Bristol City	v	Tottenham Hotspur	Failand
19:00 GMT		Report		Stadium: Robins High Performance Centre

11 November 2026	Tottenham Hotspur	v	Crystal Palace	Leyton
19:00 GMT		Report		Stadium: BetWright Stadium

18 November 2026	Tottenham Hotspur	v	Leicester City	Leyton
19:00 GMT		Report		Stadium: BetWright Stadium

16 December 2026	Ipswich Town	v	Tottenham Hotspur	Myland
19:00 GMT		Report		Stadium: JobServe Community Stadium

== Statistics ==
As of 27 September 2026

Starting appearances are listed first, followed by substitute appearances after the + symbol where applicable.

No.	Pos	Nat	Player	Total		Women's Super League		FA Cup		WSL Players Cup	
No.	Pos	Nat	Player	Apps	Goals	Apps	Goals	Apps	Goals	Apps	Goals
1	GK	(Netherlands) NED	Lize Kop	4	0	4	0	0	0	0	0
3	DF	(England) ENG	Ella Morris	4	0	0+3	0	0	0	1	0
4	DF	(Netherlands) NED	Caitlin Dijkstra	5	1	4	1	0	0	0+1	0
5	DF	(France) FRA	Alice Sombath	3	0	0+2	0	0	0	1	0
6	DF	(Sweden) SWE	Amanda Nildén	5	1	4	1	0	0	1	0
7	FW	(England) ENG	Jessica Naz	0	0	0	0	0	0	0	0
8	MF	(Norway) NOR	Signe Gaupset	5	2	4	2	0	0	0+1	0
9	FW	(Norway) NOR	Cathinka Tandberg	4	1	4	1	0	0	0	0
10	FW	(Spain) ESP	Maite Oroz	0	0	0	0	0	0	0	0
11	MF	(Denmark) DEN	Olivia Holdt	5	3	2+2	3	0	0	1	0
12	GK	(Norway) NOR	Selma Panengstuen	1	0	0	0	0	0	1	0
13	FW	(Sweden) SWE	Matilda Vinberg	5	0	2+2	0	0	0	1	0
14	FW	(Sweden) SWE	Matilda Nildén	3	0	0+2	0	0	0	1	0
15	DF	(Australia) AUS	Clare Hunt	0	0	0	0	0	0	0	0
16	FW	(Scotland) SCO	Kirsty Hanson	5	2	4	2	0	0	0+1	0
18	FW	(England) ENG	Lenna Gunning-Williams	1	0	0+1	0	0	0	0	0
19	FW	(Germany) GER	Shekiera Martinez	4	1	0+3	1	0	0	1	0
20	MF	(Finland) FIN	Olga Ahtinen	3	0	0+2	0	0	0	1	0
22	DF	(Sweden) SWE	Hanna Wijk	1	0	0	0	0	0	1	0
23	MF	(Netherlands) NED	Victoria Pelova	5	4	2+2	4	0	0	0+1	0
24	MF	(Jamaica) JAM	Drew Spence	5	0	4	0	0	0	0+1	0
25	MF	(Finland) FIN	Eveliina Summanen	4	0	2+1	0	0	0	1	0
32	DF	(Japan) JPN	Tōko Koga	4	0	4	0	0	0	0	0
41	DF	(Norway) NOR	Julie Blakstad	4	0	4	0	0	0	0	0

=== Goals ===
Rank	Pos.	No.	Player	Women's Super League	FA Cup	WSL Players Cup	Total
1	MF	23	(Netherlands) Victoria Pelova	4	0	0	4
2	MF	11	(Denmark) Olivia Holdt	3	0	0	3
3	FW	16	(Scotland) Kirsty Hanson	2	0	0	2
4	DF	4	(Netherlands) Caitlin Dijkstra	1	0	0	1
4	DF	6	(Sweden) Amanda Nildén	1	0	0	1
4	MF	8	(Norway) Signe Gaupset	1	0	0	1
4	FW	9	(Norway) Cathinka Tandberg	1	0	0	1
4	FW	19	(Germany) Shekiera Martinez	1	0	0	1
Own goals				1	0	0	1
Total				15	0	0	15

=== Assists ===
Rank	Pos.	No.	Player	Women'sSuper League	FA Cup	WSL Players Cup	Total
1	DF	8	(Norway) Signe Gaupset	3	0	0	3
2	FW	13	(Sweden) Matilda Vinberg	2	0	0	2
2	MF	24	(Jamaica) Drew Spence	2	0	0	2
2	DF	41	(Norway) Julie Blakstad	2	0	0	2
3	MF	20	(Finland) Olga Athinen	1	0	0	1
3	MF	23	(Netherlands) Victoria Pelova	1	0	0	1
Total				11	0	0	11

=== Clean sheets ===
Rank	No.	Player	Women'sSuper League	FA Cup	WSL Players Cup	Total
1	1	(Netherlands) Lize Kop	2	0	0	2
2	12	(Norway) Selma Panengstuen	0	0	1	1
Total			2	0	1	3

=== Disciplinary record ===
No.	Pos.	Player	Women's Super League			FA Cup			WSL Players Cup			Total		
No.	Pos.	Player	Yellow card	(yellow card) (yellow-red card)	Red card	Yellow card	(yellow card) (yellow-red card)	Red card	Yellow card	(yellow card) (yellow-red card)	Red card	Yellow card	(yellow card) (yellow-red card)	Red card
5	DF	(France) Alice Sombath	0	0	0	0	0	0	1	0	0	1	0	0
8	DF	(Norway) Signe Gaupset	1	0	0	0	0	0	0	0	0	1	0	0
11	MF	(Denmark) Olivia Holdt	0	0	0	0	0	0	1	0	0	1	0	0
16	FW	(Scotland) Kirsty Hanson	1	0	0	0	0	0	0	0	0	1	0	0
23	MF	(Netherlands) Victoria Pelova	1	0	0	0	0	0	0	0	0	1	0	0
25	MF	(Finland) Eveliina Summanen	1	0	0	0	0	0	0	0	0	1	0	0
41	DF	(Norway) Julie Blakstad	1	0	0	0	0	0	0	0	0	1	0	0
Total			5	0	0	0	0	0	2	0	0	7	0	0
