= Nildén =

Nildén is a Swedish surname. Notable people with the surname include:

- Amanda Nildén (born 1998), Swedish footballer
- Matilda Nildén (born 2004), Swedish footballer
