= Johanna Renmark =

Swedish footballer (born 2003)

Personal information
- Full name: Johanna Anna Maria Renmark
- Date of birth: 2 October 2003 (age 23)
- Place of birth: Surahammar, Sweden
- Position: Forward

Team information
- Current team: Brann
- Number: 11

Youth career
- 2018–2019: Gideonsberg

Senior career*
Years	Team	Apps	(Gls)
2020–2021	Eskilstuna United	8	(0)
2021	Norrköping	4	(0)
2022–2023	Uppsala	50	(14)
2023–2026	Brann	58	(12)
2026–	Djurgården	0	(0)

International career^{‡}
2018–2020	Sweden U17	19	(2)
2023–2026	Sweden U23	12	(2)
- * Club domestic league appearances and goals as of 14 February 2025 ‡ National team caps and goals as of 2 June 2025

Johanna Anna Maria Renmark (born 2 October 2003) is a Swedish professional footballer who plays as a forward for Damallsvenskan club Djurgårdens IF. She previously played for Damallsvenskan clubs Eskilstuna United and IK Uppsala, Elitettan club IFK Norrköping and Toppserien club SK Brann.

== Career ==
Renmark began her senior career with Eskilstuna United in Sweden, making 11 appearances between 2020 and 2021. She then had brief spells with Norrköping, where she made four appearances in 2021, and with Uppsala, where she played 50 matches and scored 14 goals during the 2022 and 2023 seasons. In mid-2023, Renmark moved to Brann. Renmark has represented Sweden at under-17 and under-23 level.

== Career statistics ==
=== Club ===
As of 20 October 2024.

Club	Season	League			Cup		Champions League		Other		Total	
Club	Season	Division	Apps	Goals	Apps	Goals	Apps	Goals	Apps	Goals	Apps	Goals
Eskilstuna United	2020	Damallsvenskan	5	0	1	0	—		0	0	6	0
Eskilstuna United	2021	Damallsvenskan	3	0	2	0	—		0	0	5	0
Eskilstuna United	Total		8	0	3	0	—		0	0	11	0
Norrköping	2021	Elitettan	4	0	0	0	—		0	0	4	0
Uppsala	2022	Elitettan	26	7	2	1	—		2 (Note: Appearances in Damallsvenskan play-offs)	0	30	8
Uppsala	2023	Damallsvenskan	17	5	3	1	—		0	0	20	6
Uppsala	Total		43	12	5	2	—		2	0	50	14
Brann	2023	Toppserien	9	3	1	0	7	1	0	0	17	4
Brann	2024	Toppserien	23	6	4	1	4	0	0	0	31	7
Brann	Total		32	9	5	1	11	1	0	0	48	11
Career total			87	21	13	3	11	1	2	0	113	25
