= Matilda Nildén =

Swedish footballer (born 2004)

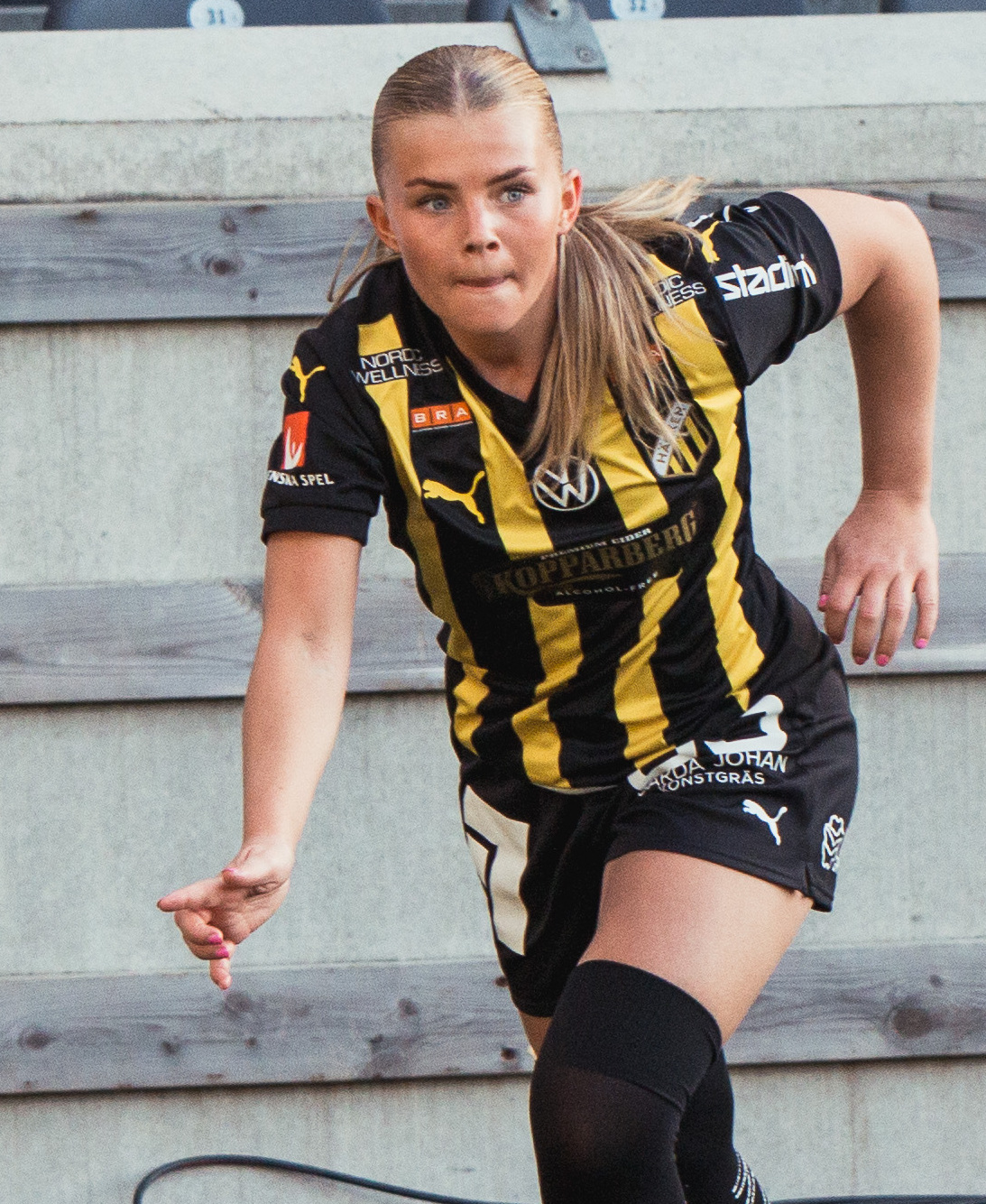
- Nildén with BK Häcken in 2025

Personal information
- Full name: Matilda Elsa Engla Nildén
- Date of birth: 10 November 2004 (age 21)
- Place of birth: Danderyd, Sweden
- Height: 1.60 m (5 ft 3 in)
- Position: Forward

Team information
- Current team: Tottenham Hotspur
- Number: 14

Youth career
- 2010–2020: IF Brommapojkarna

Senior career*
Years	Team	Apps	(Gls)
2020–2021	IF Brommapojkarna	16	(2)
2021–2023	AIK	60	(25)
2021	→ Bollstanäs SK (loan)	1	(0)
2024–2025	BK Häcken	49	(8)
2026–	Tottenham Hotspur	4	(0)

International career^{‡}
2021	Sweden U17	3	(1)
2022–2023	Sweden U19	17	(7)
2023–	Sweden U23	21	(4)
- * Club domestic league appearances and goals as of 04:59, 8 September 2026 (UTC) ‡ National team caps and goals as of 15:10, 17 May 2026 (UTC)

Matilda Elsa Engla Nildén (born 10 November 2004) is a Swedish professional footballer who plays as a forward for Women's Super League club Tottenham Hotspur. She has previously played in Sweden for Damallsvenskan and Elitettan clubs IF Brommapojkarna, AIK, and BK Häcken.

== Club career ==
=== Brommapojkarna ===
Nildén started playing for Stockholm-based club IF Brommapojkarna around the age of 6. She was moved to the club's under-17 team in 2020 and quickly rose through the ranks to the under-19 squad. The same year, she signed her first professional contract with the club. She made her senior debut in a practice match just before the COVID-19 pandemic hit; during the game, she scored a hat-trick after coming on as a halftime substitute. She left Brommapojkarna in 2021 in search of new development opportunities.

=== AIK ===
In the summer of 2021, top-flight club AIK recruited Nildén. She made her Damallsvenskan debut in August 2021 at the age of 16 and went on to play in ten games in her first season for AIK. She also spent the end of 2021 on loan in the Elitettan for Bollstanäs SK alongside multiple other young players from AIK. She scored her first Damallsvenskan goal in 2022, in a loss to Nildén's future club BK Häcken. She started a total of 17 matches as AIK were relegated down to the Elitettan after finishing the 2022 Damallsvenskan in last place.

In August 2023, Nildén went viral after being soaked by a stadium water sprinkler during a halftime interview in a game against Eskilstuna United. Nevertheless, she returned to the field in the second half and scored to help AIK win the match. Goalscoring would prove to be a common trend throughout the season for Nildén, who scored 23 times across 25 matches. She finished in second place in the Elitettan goal leaderboard, just behind Adelisa Grabus. In September 2023, she recorded a hat-trick against Trelleborgs FF to secure a top 3 finish in the league; AIK would reach even greater heights, winning the Elitettan title several games early, finishing the season undefeated, and scoring a record 97 goals. At the end of the year, Nildén chose not to extend her contract with the club, sparking backlash from the AIK fanbase.

=== BK Häcken ===
Nildén's performances for AIK caught the eye of many clubs, including multiple in the Damallsvenskan. In January 2024, she decided on BK Häcken FF, signing through the 2026 season. On 9 March 2024, she registered a debut goal in a cup match against Växjö DFF within only a few minutes of entering the game. She scored her first league goal for the club in May 2024, netting the game-tying goal that sparked a late Häcken comeback against her former team, AIK. Over the rest of the season, Nildén struggled to earn significant playing time as Häcken finished the year as Damallsvenskan runners-up. However, she ended the season on a positive note, scoring two goals against another one of her former clubs, IF Brommapojkarna, to guarantee Häcken's second-place league finish.

The following year, Nildén kicked off the season with a bang, tallying two goals against Vittsjo in a 7–1 cup victory. She went on to start 11 of her 25 Damallsvenskan matches across the year. She helped Häcken win the 2025 Damallsvenskan title, the club's first since 2020. She departed from the club having recorded 48 appearances and 8 goals across two years of league competition.

=== Tottenham Hotspur ===
On 31 December 2025, English Women's Super League club Tottenham Hotspur announced that they had acquired Nildén from Häcken for an undisclosed transfer fee and signed her to a long-term contract. The move reunited Nildén with her sister, Amanda, as well as former Häcken teammates Hanna Wijk and Josefine Rybrink.

== International career ==
Nildén has played for the Swedish U17, U19, and U23 youth national teams. She has made 17 appearances for the under-17 team, multiple of which were as a member of the squad that made it to the semifinals of the 2022 UEFA Women's Under-19 Championship. Nildén made her first appearance for the under-23 team in the summer of 2023, capping off her debut with a goal against China. She has gone on to record 4 goals in 21 appearances for the U17s across three years.

== Personal life ==
Born in Daneryd, Nildén went to high school in Stockholm.

Nildén's grandfather, Jim Nildén, made over 120 Allsvenskan appearances for AIK's men's team, while her father, David, played one season for the same club. Her sister, Amanda, plays for the Sweden national team and with Matilda at Tottenham Hotspur. Her brother, Charlie, also plays professionally.

== Career statistics ==
=== Club ===
As of match played 6 September 2026

Appearances and goals by club, season and competition
Club	Season	League			National cup (Note: Includes Svenska Cupen, Women's FA Cup)		League cup (Note: Includes Women's League Cup)		Continental		Total	
Club	Season	Division	Apps	Goals	Apps	Goals	Apps	Goals	Apps	Goals	Apps	Goals
IF Brommapojkarna	2020	Elitettan	10	2	1	0	—		—		11	2
IF Brommapojkarna	2021	Elitettan	6	0	0	0	—		—		6	0
IF Brommapojkarna			16	2	1	0	0	0	0	0	17	2
AIK	2021	Damallsvenskan	10	0	1	1	—		—		11	1
AIK	2022	Damallsvenskan	25	2	3	1	—		—		28	3
AIK	2023	Elitettan	25	23	2	0	—		—		27	23
AIK	Total		60	25	6	2	0	0	0	0	66	27
Bollstanäs SK (loan)	2021	Elitettan	1	0	0	0	—		—		1	0
BK Häcken	2023	Damallsvenskan	—		3	1	—		1 (Note: Appearance(s) in UEFA Women's Champions League)	0	4	1
BK Häcken	2024	Damallsvenskan	24	7	5	3	—		1	0	30	10
BK Häcken	2025	Damallsvenskan	25	1	1	1	—		6 (Note: Two appearance in UEFA Women's Champions League; four appearances in UEFA Women's Europa Cup)	0	32	2
BK Häcken	Total		49	8	9	5	0	0	8	0	66	13
Tottenham Hotspurs	2025–26	Women's Super League	3	0	2	0	0	0	—		5	0
Tottenham Hotspurs	2026–27	Women's Super League	1	0	0	0	0	0	—		1	0
Tottenham Hotspurs	Total		4	0	2	0	0	0	0	0	6	0
Career total			130	35	18	7	0	0	8	0	156	42
