= Amanda Nildén =

Swedish footballer (born 1998)

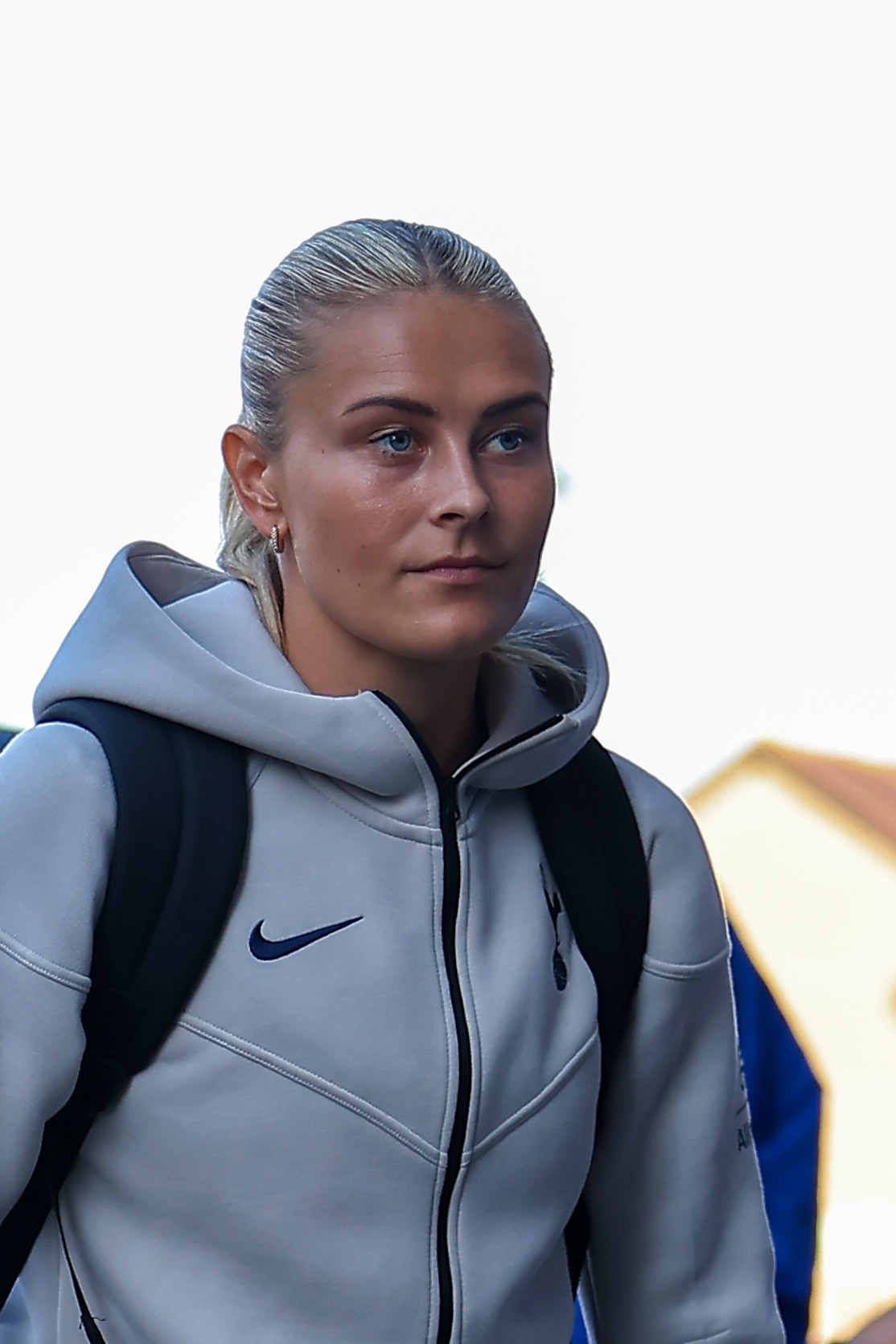
- Nildén in 2025

Personal information
- Full name: Elsa Amanda Nildén
- Date of birth: 7 August 1998 (age 28)
- Place of birth: Stockholm, Sweden
- Height: 1.68 m (5 ft 6 in)
- Positions: Defender; midfielder

Team information
- Current team: Tottenham Hotspur
- Number: 6

Youth career
- IF Brommapojkarna

Senior career*
Years	Team	Apps	(Gls)
2014–2016	IF Brommapojkarna	26	(0)
2017	AIK	23	(3)
2018–2020	Brighton & Hove Albion	20	(2)
2020–2021	Eskilstuna United	27	(0)
2021–2024	Juventus	42	(4)
2024	→ Tottenham Hotspur (loan)	10	(0)
2024–	Tottenham Hotspur	39	(1)

International career^{‡}
2013–2014	Sweden U17	14	(1)
2016–2017	Sweden U19	9	(0)
2018–2019	Sweden U23	19	(2)
2021–	Sweden	19	(0)
- * Club domestic league appearances and goals as of 07:46, 14 September 2026 (UTC) ‡ National team caps and goals as of 23:00, 14 October 2026 (UTC)

Elsa Amanda Nildén (Swedish: [ˈɛ̂lːsa aˈmânːda nɪlˈdeːn]; born 7 August 1998) is a Swedish professional footballer who plays as a defender for Women's Super League club Tottenham Hotspur and the Sweden national team.

== Club career ==
A versatile left-sided defender or midfielder, she previously played in Sweden for IF Brommapojkarna, AIK and Eskilstuna United. She has represented Sweden up to first team level.

Nildén missed the entire 2015 season with an anterior cruciate ligament injury. She signed for AIK in February 2017, emulating her father David and grandfather Jim who both played for the Stockholm club.

On 2 August 2021, Nildén joined Juventus. On 18 August, she made her debut in a 12–0 win against North Macedonian side Kamenica Sasa in the semi-finals of the first round of the UEFA Women's Champions League.

Nildén joined Tottenham Hotspur on 18 January 2024 on loan until June 2024. The loan was made permanent the same summer when Tottenham signed her on a three-year deal.

== International career ==
On 7 June 2022, Nildén was called up to the Sweden squad for the UEFA Women's Euro 2022. She was part of the team that reached the semi-finals.

On 11 June 2025, Nildén was called up to the Sweden squad for the UEFA Women's Euro 2025.

== Personal life ==
Nildén's younger sister, Matilda Nildén, is also a professional footballer. She also plays for Tottenham Hotspur, joining the club on a long term deal in January 2026.

Nildén was in a long-term relationship with Viktor Gyökeres, who is also a professional footballer.

== Career statistics ==
=== Club ===
As of match played 13 September 2026

Appearances and goals by club, season and competition
Club	Season	League			National cup (Note: Includes Svenska Cupen, Women's FA Cup, Coppa Italia)		League cup (Note: Includes Women's League Cup)		Continental (Note: Includes UEFA Women's Champions League)		Other		Total	
Club	Season	Division	Apps	Goals	Apps	Goals	Apps	Goals	Apps	Goals	Apps	Goals	Apps	Goals
IF Brommapojkarna	2014	Elitettan	12	0	1	0	—		—		—		13	0
IF Brommapojkarna	2016	Div 1 Norra Svealand	14	0	1	0	—		—		—		15	0
IF Brommapojkarna	Total		26	0	2	0	0	0	0	0	0	0	28	0
AIK	2017	Elitettan	23	2	2	0	—		—		—		25	2
Brighton & Hove Albion	2017–18	Women's Championship	6	1	0	0	0	0	—		—		6	1
Brighton & Hove Albion	2018–19	Women's Super League	4	1	0	0	1	0	—		—		5	1
Brighton & Hove Albion	2019–20	Women's Super League	10	0	1	1	5	1	—		—		16	2
Brighton & Hove Albion	Total		20	2	1	1	6	1	0	0	0	0	27	4
Eskilstuna United	2020	Damallsvenskan	15	0	5	0	—		—		—		20	0
Eskilstuna United	2021	Damallsvenskan	12	0	0	0	—		—		—		12	0
Eskilstuna United	Total		27	0	5	0	0	0	0	0	0	0	32	0
Juventus	2021–22	Serie A	18	1	4	1	—		8	0	1 (Note: Appearance(s) in Supercoppa Italiana)	1	31	3
Juventus	2022–23	Serie A	15	2	0	0	—		6	1	—		21	3
Juventus	2023–24	Serie A	9	1	0	0	—		1	0	—		10	1
Juventus	Total		42	4	4	1	0	0	16	1	1	1	62	7
Tottenham Hotspur (loan)	2023–24	Women's Super League	10	0	4	0	2	0	—		—		16	0
Tottenham Hotspur	2024–25	Women's Super League	16	1	1	0	2	0	—		—		19	1
Tottenham Hotspur	2025–26	Women's Super League	21	0	3	0	4	1	—		—		28	1
Tottenham Hotspur	2026–27	Women's Super League	2	0	0	0	0	0	—		—		2	0
Tottenham Hotspur	Total		39	1	4	0	6	1	0	0	0	0	49	2
Career total			187	9	22	2	14	2	16	1	1	1	240	15

=== International ===
As of match played 13 October 2026

Appearances and goals by national team and year
National team	Year	Apps	Goals
Sweden	2021	1	0
Sweden	2022	4	3
Sweden	2023	2	0
Sweden	2024	3	0
Sweden	2025	5	0
Sweden	2026	4	0
Total		19	0
