= Lenna Gunning-Williams =

English footballer (born 2005)

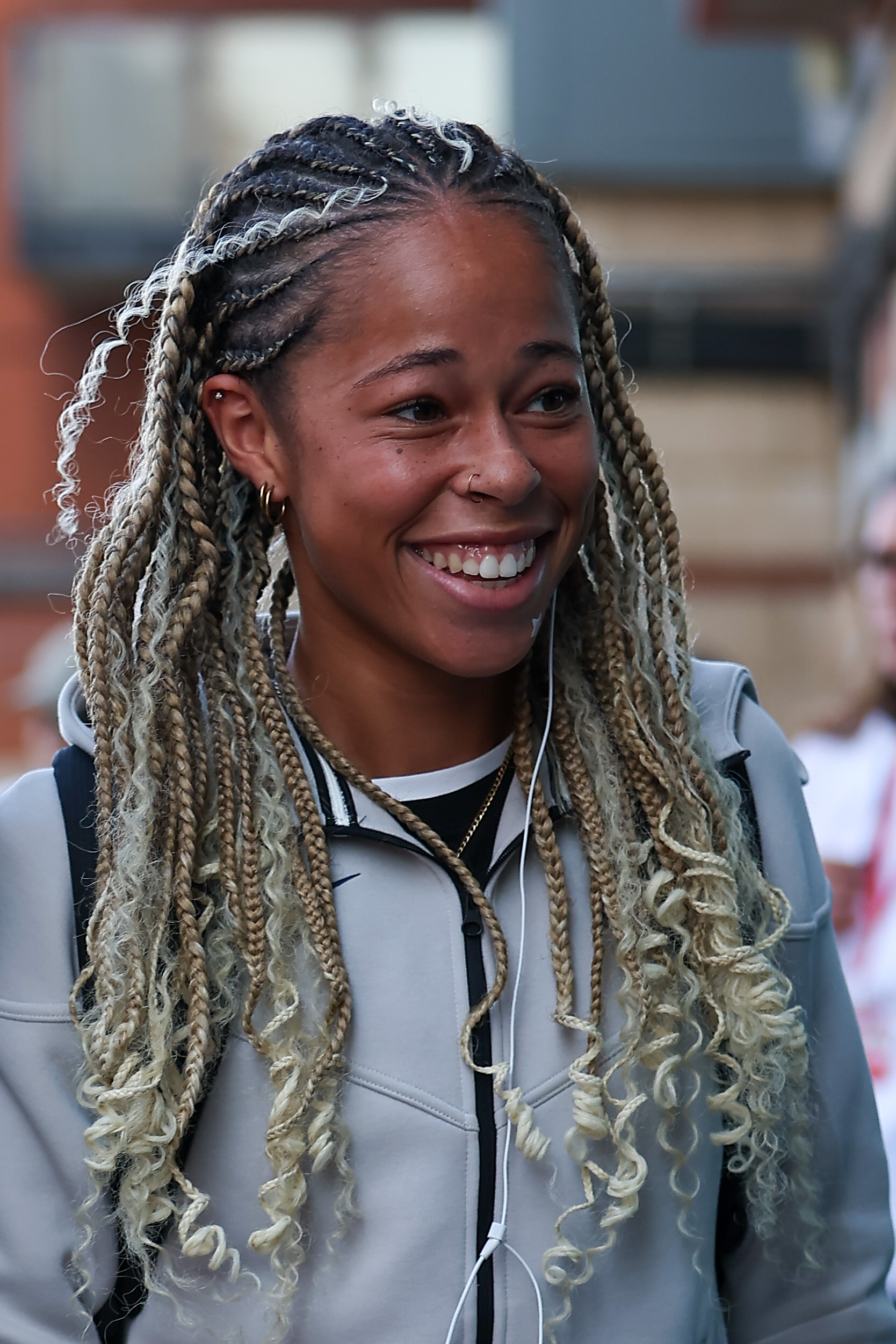
- Gunning-Williams in 2025

Personal information
- Date of birth: 5 February 2005 (age 21)
- Place of birth: London, England
- Position: Forward

Team information
- Current team: Tottenham Hotspur
- Number: 18

Youth career
- Tottenham Hotspur

Senior career*
Years	Team	Apps	(Gls)
2022–	Tottenham Hotspur	42	(4)
2023–2024	→ Ipswich Town (loan)	21	(10)

International career^{‡}
2024–	England U23	9	(1)
- * Club domestic league appearances and goals as of 15:15, 17 May 2026 (UTC) ‡ National team caps and goals as of 02:31, 28 April 2026 (UTC)

Lenna Gunning-Williams (born 5 February 2005) is an English professional footballer and actress who plays as a forward for Women's Super League club Tottenham Hotspur and the England under-23s.

== Early life and television career ==
Gunning-Williams grew up in Enfield, London.

Gunning-Williams was part of the main cast in children's football based TV show 'Jamie Johnson' between 2017 and 2020. She played the role of Jack Marshall, appearing in 31 episodes.

== Youth career ==
Gunning-Williams joined the Tottenham Hotspur academy aged 16. She scored 38 goals in 39 games for the under-21 academy side.

== Club career ==
Gunning-Williams made her senior debut for Tottenham on 27 November 2022 in a League Cup match, coming off the bench to score the final goal in a 5–1 win over Coventry United.

On 1 September 2023, she signed for National League South side Ipswich Town on loan for the 2023-24 season. Gunning-Williams scored her first senior hat-trick for Ipswich against Sutton Coldfield Town in the 2023–24 FA Cup on 27 November 2023. She finished the season as the clubs second highest scorer with 14 goals across all competitions.

== International career ==
In October 2024, Gunning-Williams was named in the England national under-23 team for European League matches against Netherlands and Portugal. On 29 October, as an 87th-minute substitute, she made her youth international debut in a 1–0 win over Portugal. On 6 March 2025, Gunning-Williams scored her debut goal for the under-23s in a 1–1 draw with the Netherlands. She provided an assist in a 3–0 win over Sweden, helping England to win the 2025-26 U23 European Competition title on 17 April 2026.

== Career statistics ==
=== Club ===
As of match played 16 May 2026

Appearances and goals by club, season and competition
Club	Season	League			National cup (Note: Includes Women's FA Cup)		League cup (Note: Includes Women's National League Cup, Women's League Cup)		Total	
Club	Season	Division	Apps	Goals	Apps	Goals	Apps	Goals	Apps	Goals
Tottenham Hotspur	2022–23	Women's Super League	1	0	0	0	2	1	3	1
Tottenham Hotspur	2023–24	Women's Super League	0	0	0	0	0	0	0	0
Tottenham Hotspur	2024–25	Women's Super League	12	0	1	0	3	0	16	0
Tottenham Hotspur	2025–26	Women's Super League	14	0	2	1	3	0	19	1
Tottenham Hotspur	Total		27	0	3	1	8	1	38	2
Ipswich Town (loan)	2023–24	National League South	21	10	4	4	1	0	26	14
Career total			48	10	7	5	9	1	64	16
