= Matilda Vinberg =

Swedish footballer

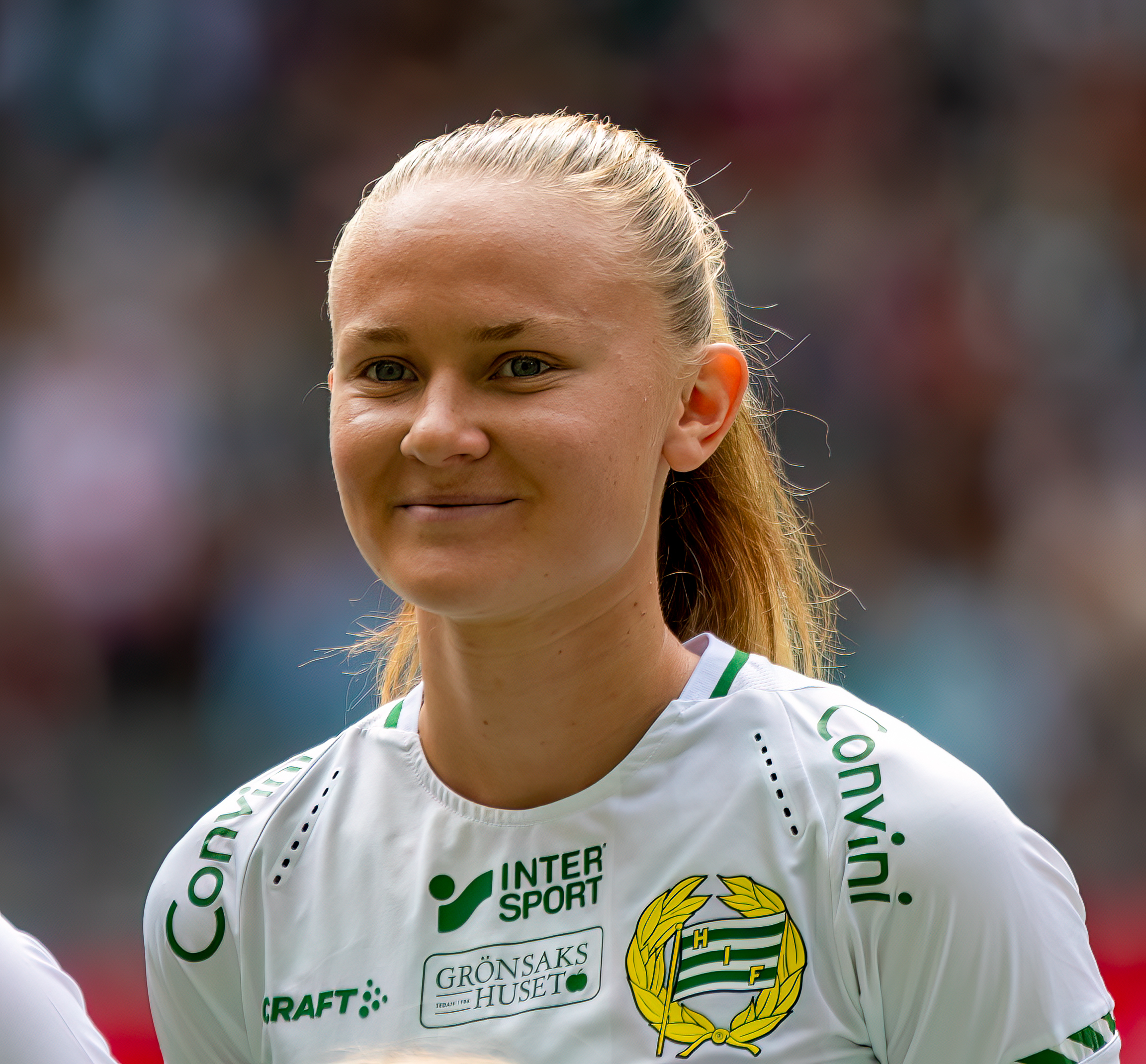
- Vinberg with Hammarby in 2022

Personal information
- Full name: Matilda Liv Vinberg
- Date of birth: 16 March 2003 (age 23)
- Place of birth: Stockholm, Sweden
- Position: Winger

Team information
- Current team: Tottenham Hotspur
- Number: 13

Youth career
- 2010–2017: Enskede IK

Senior career*
| Years | Team | Apps | (Gls) |
| 2018–2020 | Enskede IK | 33 | (18) |
| 2021–2023 | Hammarby IF | 67 | (12) |
| 2024– | Tottenham Hotspur | 50 | (2) |

International career^{‡}
| 2018–2020 | Sweden U17 | 18 | (4) |
| 2021–2022 | Sweden U19 | 12 | (4) |
| 2021– | Sweden U23 | 10 | (2) |
| 2022– | Sweden | 16 | (1) |
- * Club domestic league appearances and goals as of 07:49, 14 September 2026 (UTC) ‡ National team caps and goals as of 07:50, 14 October 2026 (UTC)

Matilda Liv Vinberg (Swedish: [maˈtɪ̂lːda liːv ˈvîːnbærj]; born 16 March 2003) is a Swedish professional footballer who plays as a winger for Women's Super League club Tottenham Hotspur and the Sweden national team.

== Club career ==
=== Enskede IK ===
Vinberg started to play youth football with local club Enskede IK at age seven. In 2018, at age 15, she made her senior debut for the side in Division 1, Sweden's third tier. In three seasons with the club, Vinberg scored 18 goals in 33 league appearances.

=== Hammarby IF ===
On 8 January 2021, Vinberg signed a two-year contract with Hammarby IF in Damallsvenskan. Throughout her debut season, she made 17 league appearances, scoring two goals, helping her side to a 7th place in table. In November, Vinberg signed a new two-year deal with the club.

In 2022, Vinberg featured in all 26 league games, scoring three goals, as Hammarby finished 5th in the table. At the end of the season, she won the prize of Breakthrough Player of the Year in Damallsvenskan. Vinberg was also voted Hammarby Player of the Year by the supporters of the club.

On 6 June 2023, Hammarby won the 2022–23 Svenska Cupen. Vinberg appeared in the final, that ended in a 3–0 win at home against BK Häcken. The club also won the 2023 Damallsvenskan, claiming its second Swedish championship after 38 years, with Vinberg scoring seven goals in 22 league appearances. On 28 December, it was announced that Vinberg would leave Hammarby at the end of the year when her contract expired.

=== Tottenham Hotspur ===
On 2 January 2024, Vinberg signed a two-and-a-half-year contract with Tottenham Hotspur in the English Women's Super League. She scored her first Spurs goal in the 1–0 win against Leicester City on 17 March 2024.

== International career ==
After making numerous youth appearances, Vinberg made her debut for the Swedish national team on 12 November 2022, coming on as a substitute in a 0–4 loss against Australia in an away friendly. A few months earlier, in September, she had previously been invited to train with the Swedish senior squad by manager Peter Gerhardsson.

She scored her first goal for her country in the Nations League on February 28, 2024, scoring first in the 5–0 win against Bosnia and Herzegovina. She played a full 90 minutes in her second start for Sweden.

== Career statistics ==
=== Club ===
As of match played 13 September 2026

Appearances and goals by club, season and competition
| Club | Season | League | | | National cup (Note: Includes Svenska Cupen, Women's FA Cup) | | League cup (Note: Includes FA Women's League Cup) | | Total | |
| Club | Season | Division | Apps | Goals | Apps | Goals | Apps | Goals | Apps | Goals |
|---|---|---|---|---|---|---|---|---|---|---|
| Enskede IK | 2018 | Division 1 | 7 | 3 | 0 | 0 | — | | 7 | 3 |
| Enskede IK | 2019 | Division 1 | 15 | 9 | 0 | 0 | — | | 15 | 9 |
| Enskede IK | 2020 | Division 1 | 11 | 6 | 2 | 2 | — | | 13 | 8 |
| Enskede IK | Total | | 33 | 18 | 2 | 2 | — | | 35 | 20 |
| Hammerby IF | 2021 | Damallsvenskan | 19 | 2 | 5 | 4 | — | | 24 | 6 |
| Hammerby IF | 2022 | Damallsvenskan | 26 | 3 | 5 | 4 | — | | 31 | 7 |
| Hammerby IF | 2023 | Damallsvenskan | 22 | 7 | 1 | 1 | — | | 23 | 8 |
| Hammerby IF | Total | | 67 | 12 | 11 | 9 | — | | 78 | 21 |
| Tottenham Hotspur | 2023–24 | Women's Super League | 11 | 1 | 5 | 0 | 2 | 0 | 18 | 1 |
| Tottenham Hotspur | 2024–25 | Women's Super League | 18 | 0 | 1 | 0 | 4 | 1 | 23 | 1 |
| Tottenham Hotspur | 2025–26 | Women's Super League | 19 | 1 | 3 | 1 | 4 | 0 | 26 | 2 |
| Tottenham Hotspur | 2026–27 | Women's Super League | 2 | 0 | 0 | 0 | 0 | 0 | 2 | 0 |
| Tottenham Hotspur | Total | | 50 | 2 | 9 | 1 | 10 | 1 | 69 | 4 |
| Career total | | | 140 | 32 | 22 | 12 | 10 | 1 | 172 | 45 |

=== International ===
As of match played 13 October 2026

Appearances and goals by national team and year
| National team | Year | Apps | Goals |
|---|---|---|---|
| Sweden | 2023 | 2 | 0 |
| Sweden | 2024 | 7 | 1 |
| Sweden | 2025 | 2 | 0 |
| Sweden | 2026 | 5 | 0 |
| Total | | 16 | 1 |

Scores and results list Sweden's goal tally first, score column indicates score after each Vinberg goal.

List of international goals scored by Matilda Vinberg
| No. | Date | Venue | Opponent | Score | Result | Competition |
|---|---|---|---|---|---|---|
| 1 | 28 February 2024 | Stockholm, Sweden | Bosnia and Herzegovina | 1–0 | 5–0 | 2023–24 UEFA Women's Nations League promotion/relegation matches |

== Honours ==
Hammarby IF

- Svenska Cupen: 2022–23
- Damallsvenskan: 2023

Individual

- Hammarby IF Player of the Year: 2022
- Damallsvenskan Breakthrough Player of the Year: 2022
