= Tōko Koga =

Japanese footballer (born 2006)

Tōko Koga 古賀 塔子
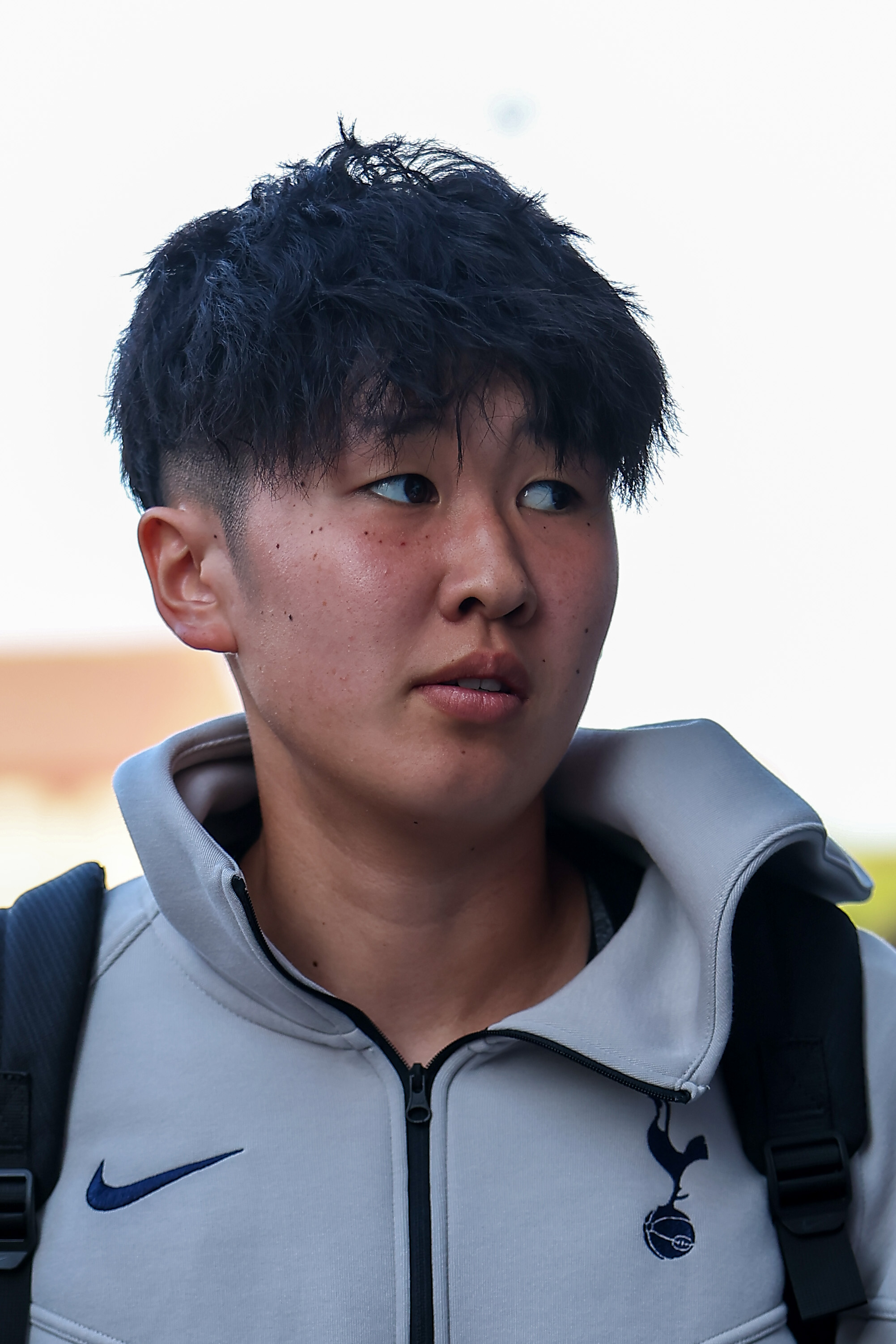
- Koga in 2025

Personal information
- Date of birth: 6 January 2006 (age 20)
- Place of birth: Toyonaka, Osaka, Japan
- Height: 1.73 m (5 ft 8 in)
- Position: Defender

Team information
- Current team: Tottenham Hotspur
- Number: 32

Youth career
- FC Grasion
- 2018–2023: JFA Academy Fukushima

Senior career*
Years	Team	Apps	(Gls)
2018–2023	JFA Academy Fukushima	44	(3)
2024–2025	Feyenoord	32	(3)
2025–	Tottenham Hotspur	21	(2)

International career^{‡}
2022	Japan U-17	5	(1)
2023–	Japan	29	(4)
Medal record
Women's football
Representing Japan
AFC Women's Asian Cup
Winner	2026 Australia
- * Club domestic league appearances and goals as of 07:55, 14 September 2026 (UTC) ‡ National team caps and goals as of 07:25, 20 April 2026 (UTC)

Tōko Koga (古賀 塔子, Koga Tōko; Japanese: [koɡa toːko]; born 6 January 2006) is a Japanese professional footballer who plays as a defender for Women's Super League club Tottenham Hotspur and the Japan national team.

== Early life ==
Koga was born in Toyonaka, Osaka Prefecture on 6 January 2006. She began playing football at the age of six under the influence of her older brother and her father. She joined her local club FC Grasion where her older brother also played at the time, playing alongside boys. She joined JFA Academy Fukushima, the youth development program of the Japan Football Association, during her sixth grade after passing their selection test. She would leave her home in Osaka to live in the academy dormitory in Shizuoka Prefecture. While at the academy, she befriended and progressed through the ranks with her future national teammate, Momoko Tanikawa. Upon graduation from high school, Koga moved overseas to pursue a professional career on the recommendation of her coach.

== Club career ==
=== Feyenoord ===
Through a partnership with Vrouwen Eredivisie club Feyenoord, Koga was given the opportunity to complete a trial with the team, where she would feature in a friendly match against Eintracht Frankfurt. In January 2024, Koga signed with the club on a contract lasting through mid-2026. On January 27, 2024, Koga made her debut for Feyenoord in a home league match defeat against FC Twente. On 2 November 2024, she scored her first goal for the club in a 3–0 league win against SC Heerenveen.

In the following season, Koga would feature prominently in the starting line-up as she played 21 league matches and scored three goals.

=== Tottenham Hotspur ===
On 2 July 2025, Koga signed for Women's Super League club Tottenham Hotspur on a four-year deal.

== International career ==
On 14 June 2024, Koga was included in the Japan squad for the 2024 Summer Olympics.

Koga was part of the Japan squad that won the 2025 SheBelieves Cup.

Koga was part of the Japan squad which won the 2026 AFC Women's Asian Cup, where she featured in a 1–0 win over Australia in the tournament's final on 21 March 2026.

== Career statistics ==
=== Club ===
As of match played 13 September 2026

Appearances and goals by club, season and competition
Club	Season	League			National Cup (Note: Includes Empress's Cup, KNVB Women's Cup)		League Cup (Note: Includes Women's League Cup)		Total	
Club	Season	Division	Apps	Goals	Apps	Goals	Apps	Goals	Apps	Goals
JFA Academy Fukushima	2021	Nadeshiko League 2	14	1	1	0	—		15	1
JFA Academy Fukushima	2022	Nadeshiko League 2	7	0	1	0	—		8	0
JFA Academy Fukushima	2023	Nadeshiko League 2	14	2	1	0	—		15	2
JFA Academy Fukushima	Total		35	3	3	0	0	0	38	3
Feyenoord	2023–24	Vrouwen Eredivisie	11	0	3	0	—		14	0
Feyenoord	2024–25	Vrouwen Eredivisie	21	3	3	0	—		24	3
Feyenoord	Total		32	3	6	0	0	0	38	3
Tottenham Hotspur	2025–26	Women's Super League	19	2	3	0	4	0	26	2
Tottenham Hotspur	2026–27	Women's Super League	2	0	0	0	0	0	2	0
Tottenham Hotspur	Total		21	2	3	0	4	0	28	2
Career Total			88	8	12	0	4	0	104	8

=== International ===
As of match played 18 April 2026

Appearances and goals by national team and year
National team	Year	Apps	Goals
Japan	2023	2	0
Japan	2024	10	1
Japan	2025	10	1
Japan	2026	7	2
Total		29	4

Scores and results list Japan's goal tally first, score column indicates score after each Koga goal.

List of international goals scored by Tōko Koga
No.	Date	Venue	Opponent	Score	Result	Competition
1	31 May 2024	Estadio Nueva Condomina, Murcia, Spain	New Zealand	2–0	2–0	Friendly
2	26 February 2025	Snapdragon Stadium, San Diego, United States	United States	2–1	2–1	2025 SheBelieves Cup
3	15 March 2026	Stadium Australia, Sydney, Australia	Philippines	2–0	7–0	2026 AFC Women's Asian Cup
4	15 March 2026	Stadium Australia, Sydney, Australia	Philippines	5–0	7–0	2026 AFC Women's Asian Cup

== Honours ==
Japan

- AFC Women's Asian Cup: 2026
- Asian Games: 2023
- SheBelieves Cup: 2025

Individual

- PFA WSL Team of the Year: 2025–26
