= 2025–26 Tottenham Hotspur F.C. Women season =

Tottenham Hotspur
2025–26 season
- Head coach: Martin Ho
- Stadium: Brisbane Road, Leyton
- WSL: 5th
- FA Cup: Quarter-finals
- League Cup: Quarter-finals
- Top goalscorer: League: Olivia Holdt (8); All: Olivia Holdt (10)
- Highest home attendance: 9,356 (vs. Chelsea, 8 February)
- Lowest home attendance: 1,356 (vs. Aston Villa, 7 December)
- Average home league attendance: 3,571
- Biggest win: 7–3 v Aston Villa (A); WSL; 15 February 2026
- Biggest defeat: 1–5 v Manchester City (H); WSL; 19 September 2025
| Home colours | Away colours | Third colours |

The 2025–26 season was Tottenham Hotspur's seventh season in the top flight of the English football league system and 41st season in existence. Along with competing in the WSL, the club will also contest two domestic cup competitions: the FA Cup and the League Cup.

== Season summary ==
On 4 July 2025, Martin Ho was announced as head coach of Tottenham Hotspur on a three-year contract.

On 2 September 2025, Tōko Koga became Tottenham Hotspur's youngest goalscorer at the age of 19 years and 300 days, after scoring against Liverpool in the 19th minute.

On 1 February 2026, Eveliina Summanen made her 100th league appearance for the club.

On 5 February 2026, Araya Dennis signed a new long-term contract with the club.

On 11 February 2026, Summanen signed a new long-term contract with the club.

On 30 April 2026, it was announced that Bethany England would be leaving the club at the end of the season.

On 3 May 2026, after a 2–1 win over London City Lionesses, it was announced that Spurs had broken their record points tally, gaining 33 points, meaning they were guaranteed to finish 5th based on the table. They can still record a higher record if they win their last game of the season. On 16 May 2026, after beating Brighton, they finished the season on a record 36 points tally.

== Squad ==
As of 2 February 2026

Note: Flags indicate national team as defined under FIFA eligibility rules; some limited exceptions apply. Players may hold more than one non-FIFA nationality.

| No. | Pos. | Nation | Player |
|---|---|---|---|
| 1 | GK | NED | Lize Kop |
| 2 | DF | AUS | Charli Grant |
| 3 | DF | ENG | Ella Morris |
| 4 | DF | ENG | Amy James-Turner |
| 5 | DF | ENG | Molly Bartrip (vice-captain) |
| 6 | DF | SWE | Amanda Nildén |
| 7 | FW | ENG | Jessica Naz |
| 8 | MF | NOR | Signe Gaupset |
| 9 | FW | ENG | Bethany England (captain) |
| 10 | MF | ESP | Maite Oroz |
| 11 | MF | DEN | Olivia Holdt |
| 12 | DF | SWE | Josefine Rybrink |
| 13 | FW | SWE | Matilda Vinberg |
| 14 | FW | SWE | Matilda Nildén |

| No. | Pos. | Nation | Player |
|---|---|---|---|
| 15 | DF | AUS | Clare Hunt |
| 18 | FW | ENG | Lenna Gunning-Williams |
| 19 | FW | NOR | Cathinka Tandberg |
| 20 | MF | FIN | Olga Ahtinen (vice-captain) |
| 21 | DF | SUI | Luana Bühler |
| 22 | DF | SWE | Hanna Wijk |
| 23 | FW | JPN | Maika Hamano (on loan from Chelsea) |
| 24 | MF | JAM | Drew Spence |
| 25 | MF | FIN | Eveliina Summanen |
| 27 | GK | ENG | Eleanor Heeps |
| 30 | FW | ENG | Araya Dennis |
| 32 | DF | JPN | Tōko Koga |
| 41 | DF | NOR | Julie Blakstad |

=== Out on loan ===
Note: Flags indicate national team as defined under FIFA eligibility rules; some limited exceptions apply. Players may hold more than one non-FIFA nationality.

| No. | Pos. | Nation | Player |
|---|---|---|---|
| 16 | FW | ENG | Kit Graham (at Ipswich Town until 30 June 2026) |
| 17 | FW | SCO | Martha Thomas (at Liverpool until 30 June 2026) |
| — | MF | HUN | Anna Csiki (at Roma until 30 June 2026) |

== Pre-season ==
| 23 August 2025 | Arsenal | 3–4 | Tottenham Hotspur | Borehamwood |
| 15:00 BST | Pelova 7'; Grant 31' (o.g.); Foord 74' | Report | England 14', 59' (pen.); Vinberg 62'; Summanen 77' | Stadium: Meadow Park; Attendance: 1926; Referee: Matthew Norton |

| 31 August 2025 | Southampton | 1–3 | Tottenham Hotspur | Snows Stadium |
| | Primus 54' | Report | Thomas 30'; Jessica Naz 62'; Holdt 73' | Referee: Joanne Horwood |

== Transfers ==
=== Transfers in ===
| Date | Position | Nationality | Name | From | Ref. |
|---|---|---|---|---|---|
| 2 July 2025 | DF | (Japan) | Tōko Koga | (Netherlands) Feyenoord | |
| 4 September 2025 | FW | (Norway) | Cathinka Tandberg | (Sweden) Hammarby | |
| 1 January 2026 (Note: Deal agreed 21 November 2025) | MF | (Norway) | Signe Gaupset | (Norway) Brann | |
| 1 January 2026 (Note: Deal agreed 30 December 2025) | DF | (Sweden) | Hanna Wijk | (Sweden) BK Häcken | |
| 1 January 2026 (Note: Deal agreed 31 December 2025) | FW | (Sweden) | Matilda Nildén | (Sweden) BK Häcken | |
| 5 January 2026 | DF | (Norway) | Julie Blakstad | (Sweden) Hammarby | |

=== Loans in ===
| Date | Position | Nationality | Name | From | Until | Ref. |
|---|---|---|---|---|---|---|
| 4 January 2026 | FW | (Japan) | Maika Hamano | (England) Chelsea | End of season | |

=== Transfers out ===
| Date | Position | Nationality | Name | To | Ref. |
|---|---|---|---|---|---|
| 27 June 2025 | FW | (Morocco) | Rosella Ayane | (England) Leicester City | |
| 7 July 2025 | GK | (Jamaica) | Becky Spencer | (England) Chelsea | |
| 29 August 2025 | FW | (Australia) | Hayley Raso | (Germany) Eintracht Frankfurt | |
| 8 September 2025 | DF | (England) | Zara Bailey | (England) Crystal Palace | |
| 8 January 2026 | DF | (England) | Ashleigh Neville | (England) Leicester City | |

=== Loans out ===
| Date | Position | Nationality | Name | To | Until | Ref. |
|---|---|---|---|---|---|---|
| 4 September 2025 | MF | (Hungary) | Anna Csiki | (England) West Ham United | 22 January 2026 | |
| 17 January 2026 | FW | (Scotland) | Martha Thomas | (England) Liverpool | End of season | |
| 22 January 2026 | FW | (England) | Kit Graham | (England) Ipswich Town | End of season | |
| 2 February 2026 | MF | (Hungary) | Anna Csiki | (Italy) Roma | End of season | |

== Women's Super League ==
=== Results ===
| 7 September 2025 1 | Tottenham Hotspur | 1–0 | West Ham United | Leyton |
| 12:00 | Tandberg (yellow card) 70'; England 86' (pen.) | Report | Graham (yellow card) 90+6' | Stadium: Brisbane Road; Attendance: 1,735; Referee: Phoebe Cross |

| 14 September 2025 2 | Everton | 0–2 | Tottenham Hotspur | Liverpool |
| 14:30 | van Gool (yellow card) 68' | Report | Ahtinen 27'; Tandberg (yellow card) 31' (goal) 49'; Summanen (yellow card) 86' | Stadium: Goodison Park; Attendance: 6,473; Referee: Kirsty Dowle |

| 19 September 2025 3 | Tottenham Hotspur | 1–5 | Manchester City | Leyton |
| 19:30 | Grant (yellow card) 46'; Hunt (yellow card) 55'; Spence (yellow card) 58'; Holdt 87' | Report | Fujino 23'; Miedema 39'; Casparij 43'; Clinton 80'; Coombs 90+5' | Stadium: Brisbane Road; Attendance: 1,631; Referee: Stacey Fullicks |

| 28 September 2025 4 | Leicester City | 1–2 | Tottenham Hotspur | Leicester |
| 12:00 | McLoughlin (yellow card) 33'; Tierney 40'; Cain (yellow card) 50' | Report | Tandberg 15'; Holdt 21'; Summanen (yellow card) 50'; Ahtinen (yellow card) 63'; Hunt (yellow card) 85' | Stadium: King Power Stadium; Attendance: 1,404; Referee: Harrison Blair |

| 5 October 2025 5 | Tottenham Hotspur | 1–0 | Brighton & Hove Albion | Leyton |
| 11:55 | Tandberg 26'; Koga (yellow card) 52'; Spence (yellow card) 66'; Nildén (yellow card) 90+1' | Report | Hayes (yellow card) 35' | Stadium: Brisbane Road; Attendance: 1,427; Referee: Ryan Atkin |

| 12 October 2025 6 | Chelsea | 1–0 | Tottenham Hotspur | Kingston upon Thames |
| 12:00 | Carpenter (yellow card) 15'; Walsh 61'; Bright (yellow card) 71' | Report | Nildén (yellow card) 63' | Stadium: Kingsmeadow; Attendance: 3,925; Referee: Grace Lowe |

| 2 November 2025 7 | Tottenham Hotspur | 2–1 | Liverpool | Leyton |
| 12:15 | Koga 19'; England 52' | Report | Olsson 11'; Holland (yellow card) 61' | Stadium: Brisbane Road; Attendance: 1,674; Referee: Sophie Dennington |

| 9 November 2025 8 | London City Lionesses | 4–2 | Tottenham Hotspur | Bromley |
| 11:55 | Godfrey 8', 84', (yellow card) 66'; Parris (yellow card) 25', (goal) 50'; Geyoro (yellow card) 33'; Asllani (yellow card) 68'; Nildén 81' (o.g.) | Report | Nildén (yellow card) 34'; Tandberg 38'; Neville (yellow card) 48'; Summanen 69'; Thomas (yellow card) 80' | Stadium: Hayes Lane; Attendance: 2,138; Referee: Stacey Pearson |

| 16 November 2025 9 | Tottenham Hotspur | 0–0 | Arsenal | Leyton |
| 14:30 | Thomas (yellow card) 82' | Report | McCabe (yellow card) 41' | Stadium: Brisbane Road; Attendance: 6,788; Referee: Emily Heaslip |

| 7 December 2025 10 | Tottenham Hotspur | 2–1 | Aston Villa | Leyton |
| 12:00 | Hunt (yellow card) 29'; England 85'; Holdt 90+5' | Report | Deslandes (yellow card) 28' (yellow-red card); Hanson 84' | Stadium: Brisbane Road; Attendance: 1,356; Referee: Abigail Byrne |

| 14 December 2025 11 | Manchester United | 3–3 | Tottenham Hotspur | Leigh |
| 14:30 | Zigiotti Olme (yellow card) 74'; Toone 74'; Malard (yellow card) 74'; Rolfö 82', 90+4' | Report | England 37'; Summanen 45+2'; Thomas 61'; Nildén (yellow card) 73'; Kop (yellow card) 89' | Stadium: Leigh Sports Village; Attendance: 3,148; Referee: Emily Heaslip |

| 11 January 2026 12 | Tottenham Hotspur | 1–0 | Leicester City | Leyton |
| 12:00 | Neville 40' (o.g.) | Report | Tierney (yellow card) 82'; Neville (yellow card) 90+3' | Stadium: Brisbane Road; Attendance: 1,384; Referee: Sophie Dennington |

| 25 January 2026 13 | Liverpool | 2–0 | Tottenham Hotspur | St Helens |
| 11:55 | O'Sullivan (yellow card) 70'; Koga 90+4' (o.g.); Enderby 90+5' | Report | Spence (yellow card) 82' | Stadium: Totally Wicked Stadium; Attendance: 2,653; Referee: Grace Lowe |
Note: Fixture was initially scheduled for a 14:00 kick-off, but was moved for live Sky Sports broadcast.

| 1 February 2026 14 | West Ham United | 1–2 | Tottenham Hotspur | Dagenham |
| 12:00 | Martinez 10'; Ueki (yellow card) 77' | Report | Vinberg 54'; Holdt 73'; Tandberg (yellow card) 88'; Spence (red card) 90+6' | Stadium: Victoria Road; Attendance: 1,525; Referee: Emily Heaslip |

| 8 February 2026 15 | Tottenham Hotspur | 0–2 | Chelsea | Tottenham |
| 14:30 | Tandberg (yellow card) 80'; Dennis (yellow card) 89' | Report | Walsh 39'; Thompson 50' | Stadium: Tottenham Hotspur Stadium; Attendance: 9,356; Referee: Phoebe Cross |

| 15 February 2026 16 | Aston Villa | 3–7 | Tottenham Hotspur | Birmingham |
| 12:00 | Hanson 16', 80'; Staniforth (yellow card) 34'; Jean-François 68' | Report | Gaupset 10'; England 19'; Holdt 26'; A. Nildén (yellow card) 45+4'; Tandberg 69', 82'; Hamano 72'; Blakstad 85'; Hunt (yellow card) 90+5' | Stadium: Villa Park; Attendance: 2,563; Referee: Kirsty Dowle |

| 15 March 2026 17 | Tottenham Hotspur | 1–2 | Everton | Tottenham |
| 11:55 | Gaupset 76' | Report | Momiki 12'; Gago 83'; Gabarro (yellow card) 85' | Stadium: Tottenham Hotspur Stadium; Attendance: 4,816; Referee: Lisa Benn |

| 21 March 2026 18 | Manchester City | 5–2 | Tottenham Hotspur | Manchester |
| 12:00 | Shaw 8', 18', 21'; Kerolin 37'; Nildén 45' (o.g.) | Report | Holdt 15'; Wijk (yellow card) 56'; England 85' | Stadium: Academy Stadium; Attendance: 4,575; Referee: Abigail Byrne |

| 28 March 2026 19 | Arsenal | 5–2 | Tottenham Hotspur | Holloway |
| 17:30 | Russo 5', 7', 27'; Smith (yellow card) 38'; Foord 61'; Van Domselaar (yellow card) 90+1'; Blackstenius 90+5' | Report | Maanum 20' (o.g.); Nildén (yellow card) 38'; England 78' | Stadium: Emirates Stadium; Attendance: 46,123; Referee: Grace Lowe |

| 26 April 2026 20 | Tottenham Hotspur | 0–0 | Manchester United | Leyton |
| 14:00 | Hamano (yellow card) 76' | Report | Sandberg (yellow card) 65'; Malard (yellow card) 90+8' | Stadium: Brisbane Road; Attendance: 7,310; Referee: Melissa Burgin |

| 3 May 2026 21 | Tottenham Hotspur | 2–1 | London City Lionesses | Leyton |
| 14:00 | Gaupset 13'; Holdt 28' | Report | Kennedy (yellow card) 49' (goal) 90' | Stadium: Brisbane Road; Attendance: 1,809; Referee: Megan Wilson |

| 16 May 2026 22 | Brighton & Hove Albion | 1–2 | Tottenham Hotspur | Falmer |
| 13:00 BST | Haley 49'; Hayes (yellow card) 68' | Report | Nildén (yellow card) 54'; Morris (yellow card) 66'; Holdt 81'; Spence (yellow card) 86'; Koga 90+2' | Stadium: Falmer Stadium; Attendance: 6,749; Referee: Stacey Pearson |
Note: Fixture was originally scheduled to be played at the Broadfield Stadium with a 14:00 kick-off.

=== League table ===
| Pos | Team | Pld | W | D | L | GF | GA | GD | Pts | Qualification or relegation |
|---|---|---|---|---|---|---|---|---|---|---|
| 3 | Chelsea | 22 | 15 | 4 | 3 | 44 | 20 | +24 | 49 | Qualification for the Champions League third qualifying round |
| 4 | Manchester United | 22 | 11 | 7 | 4 | 38 | 22 | +16 | 40 | |
| 5 | Tottenham Hotspur | 22 | 11 | 3 | 8 | 35 | 38 | −3 | 36 | |
| 6 | London City Lionesses | 22 | 8 | 3 | 11 | 28 | 35 | −7 | 27 | |
| 7 | Brighton & Hove Albion | 22 | 7 | 5 | 10 | 27 | 28 | −1 | 26 | |

Source: WSL League Table
Rules for classification: 1) Points; 2) Goal difference; 3) Number of goals scored.

== Women's FA Cup ==
As a member of the first tier, Tottenham entered the FA Cup in the fourth round proper.

| 18 January 2026 Fourth round | Tottenham Hotspur | 3–0 | Leicester City | Leyton |
| 12:00 | England 24'; Spence 74'; Summanen (yellow card) 84'; Gunning-Williams 90+1' | Report | Neville (yellow card) 64'; Jansson (yellow card) 88' | Stadium: Brisbane Road; Attendance: 1,062; Referee: Kirsty Dowle |

| 23 February 2026 Fifth round | London City Lionesses | 2–2 (a.e.t.) (8–9 p) | Tottenham Hotspur | Bromley |
| 19:30 | van de Donk 58'; Fernández 59' | Report | Vinberg 7'; England 90+6' (pen.) | Stadium: Hayes Lane; Attendance: 1,400; Referee: Ryan Atkin |
| | Penalties |
| | Goodwin (penalty scored); Corrales (penalty scored); Pattinson (penalty scored); Roddar (penalty scored); Partido (penalty scored); Kumagai (penalty scored); Marcetto (penalty scored); Fernández (penalty scored); Sangaré (penalty missed) | | England (penalty scored); Tandberg (penalty scored); A. Nildén (penalty scored); Gaupset (penalty scored); Koga (penalty scored); Kop (penalty scored); Ahtinen (penalty scored); Gunning-Williams (penalty scored); Wijk (penalty scored) |

| 6 April 2026 Quarter-finals | Chelsea | 2–1 | Tottenham Hotspur | Kingston upon Thames |
| 13:30 | Kerr 40'; Buurman 86' | Report | Spence (yellow card) 15'; A. Nildén (yellow card) 27'; Tandberg (yellow card) 33'; Summanen 52' | Stadium: Kingsmeadow; Attendance: 2,736; Referee: Stacey Pearson |

== Women's League Cup ==
| 24 September 2025 Group stage | Tottenham Hotspur | 0–0 (7–6 p) | Aston Villa | Leyton |
| 19:00 BST | | Report | | Stadium: Brisbane Road; Attendance: 664; Referee: Phoebe Cross |
| | Penalties |
| | Gunning-Williams (penalty missed); England (penalty scored); Nildén (penalty scored); Vinberg (penalty scored); Summanen (penalty scored); Spence (penalty scored); Kop (penalty scored); Koga (penalty scored) | | (penalty scored) Mayling; (penalty scored) Patten; (penalty scored) Baijings; (penalty missed) Taylor; (penalty scored) Deslandes; (penalty scored) Wilms; (penalty scored) Kendall; (penalty missed) Mullett |

| 19 October 2025 Group stage | Tottenham Hotspur | 3–0 | Birmingham City | Leyton |
| 14:00 BST | Holdt 40', 74'; Nilden 53' | Report | | Stadium: Brisbane Road; Attendance: 680; Referee: Ryan Atkin |

| 23 November 2025 Group stage | Bristol City | 0–1 | Tottenham Hotspur | Failand |
| 15:00 GMT | Meena (yellow card) 45'; Dafeur (yellow card) 64'; Bennett (yellow card) 83' | Report | Thomas 46'; Spence (yellow card) 90' | Stadium: Robins HPC; Referee: Amy Fearn |

| Pos | Team | Pld | W | PW | PL | L | GF | GA | GD | Pts | Qualification |
|---|---|---|---|---|---|---|---|---|---|---|---|
| 1 | Tottenham Hotspur | 3 | 2 | 1 | 0 | 0 | 4 | 0 | +4 | 8 | Advanced to knockout stage |
| 2 | Aston Villa | 3 | 1 | 0 | 2 | 0 | 6 | 3 | +3 | 5 | |
| 3 | Birmingham City | 3 | 0 | 2 | 0 | 1 | 5 | 8 | −3 | 4 | |
| 4 | Bristol City | 3 | 0 | 0 | 1 | 2 | 2 | 6 | −4 | 1 | |

Source: Women's League Cup
Rules for classification: 1) Points; 2) Goal difference; 3) Number of goals scored; 4) Number of wins; 5) Head-to-head record

=== Knockout stage ===
| 21 December 2025 Quarter-final | Manchester United | 2–1 | Tottenham Hotspur | Leigh |
| 13:00 GMT | Park 51'; Rolfö 86' | Report | Spence 16', (yellow card) 23'; Nildén (yellow card) 55'; Dennis (yellow card) 89' | Stadium: Leigh Sports Village; Attendance: 2,027; Referee: Phoebe Cross |

== Appearances ==
Starting appearances are listed first, followed by substitute appearances after the + symbol where applicable.

As of match played 16 May 2026

| No. | Pos. | Nat. | Player | Women's Super League | | FA Cup | | League Cup | | Total | |
| No. | Pos. | Nat. | Player | Apps | Goals | Apps | Goals | Apps | Goals | Apps | Goals |
|---|---|---|---|---|---|---|---|---|---|---|---|
| 1 | GK | (Netherlands) | Lize Kop | 22 | 0 | 3 | 0 | 4 | 0 | 29 | 0 |
| 2 | DF | (Australia) | Charli Grant | 1+4 | 0 | 0 | 0 | 0+2 | 0 | 1+6 | 0 |
| 3 | DF | (England) | Ella Morris | 3 | 0 | 0+1 | 0 | 0 | 0 | 3+1 | 0 |
| 4 | DF | (England) | Amy James-Turner | 0 | 0 | 0 | 0 | 0 | 0 | 0 | 0 |
| 5 | DF | (England) | Molly Bartrip | 4+2 | 0 | 1 | 0 | 0+1 | 0 | 5+3 | 0 |
| 6 | DF | (Sweden) | Amanda Nildén | 20+1 | 0 | 2+1 | 0 | 4 | 1 | 26+2 | 0 |
| 7 | FW | (England) | Jessica Naz | 10 | 0 | 0 | 0 | 2+1 | 0 | 12+1 | 0 |
| 8 | MF | (Norway) | Signe Gaupset | 11 | 3 | 3 | 0 | 0 | 0 | 14 | 3 |
| 9 | FW | (England) | Bethany England | 15+6 | 7 | 2+1 | 2 | 1+3 | 0 | 18+10 | 9 |
| 10 | MF | (Spain) | Maite Oroz | 0+1 | 0 | 0 | 0 | 2 | 0 | 2+1 | 0 |
| 11 | MF | (Denmark) | Olivia Holdt | 19+2 | 8 | 2+1 | 0 | 3+1 | 2 | 24+4 | 10 |
| 12 | DF | (Sweden) | Josefine Rybrink | 8+1 | 0 | 1 | 0 | 3 | 0 | 12+1 | 0 |
| 13 | FW | (Sweden) | Matilda Vinberg | 15+4 | 1 | 3 | 1 | 4 | 0 | 22+4 | 2 |
| 14 | FW | (Sweden) | Matilda Nildén | 0+3 | 0 | 0+2 | 0 | 0 | 0 | 0+5 | 0 |
| 15 | DF | (Australia) | Clare Hunt | 16 | 0 | 1 | 0 | 4 | 0 | 21 | 0 |
| 18 | FW | (England) | Lenna Gunning-Williams | 1+13 | 0 | 0+2 | 1 | 0+3 | 0 | 1+18 | 1 |
| 19 | FW | (Norway) | Cathinka Tandberg | 13+6 | 6 | 2 | 0 | 3 | 0 | 18+6 | 6 |
| 20 | MF | (Finland) | Olga Ahtinen | 3+12 | 1 | 0+2 | 0 | 2+1 | 0 | 5+15 | 1 |
| 21 | DF | (Switzerland) | Luana Bühler | 0 | 0 | 0 | 0 | 0 | 0 | 0 | 0 |
| 22 | DF | (Sweden) | Hanna Wijk | 5 | 0 | 2+1 | 0 | 0 | 0 | 7+1 | 0 |
| 23 | FW | (Japan) | Maika Hamano | 6+2 | 1 | 2 | 0 | 0 | 0 | 8+2 | 1 |
| 24 | MF | (Jamaica) | Drew Spence | 18+1 | 0 | 1+1 | 1 | 2+1 | 1 | 21+3 | 2 |
| 25 | MF | (Finland) | Eveliina Summanen | 17+4 | 2 | 3 | 1 | 3 | 0 | 23+4 | 3 |
| 27 | GK | (England) | Eleanor Heeps | 0 | 0 | 0 | 0 | 0 | 0 | 0 | 0 |
| 30 | FW | (England) | Araya Dennis | 1+4 | 0 | 0 | 0 | 0+2 | 0 | 1+6 | 0 |
| 32 | DF | (Japan) | Tōko Koga | 19 | 2 | 3 | 0 | 4 | 0 | 26 | 2 |
| 41 | DF | (Norway) | Julie Blakstad | 8+2 | 1 | 2+1 | 0 | 0 | 0 | 10+3 | 1 |
Players away from the club on loan:
| 16 | FW | (England) | Kit Graham | 0+3 | 0 | 0 | 0 | 0+1 | 0 | 0+4 | 0 |
| 17 | FW | (Scotland) | Martha Thomas | 1+9 | 1 | 0 | 0 | 2+1 | 1 | 3+10 | 2 |
Players who appeared for the club but left during the season:
| 29 | DF | (England) | Ashleigh Neville | 6+2 | 0 | 0 | 0 | 1 | 0 | 7+2 | 0 |
