= Cathinka Tandberg =

Norwegian footballer (born 2004)

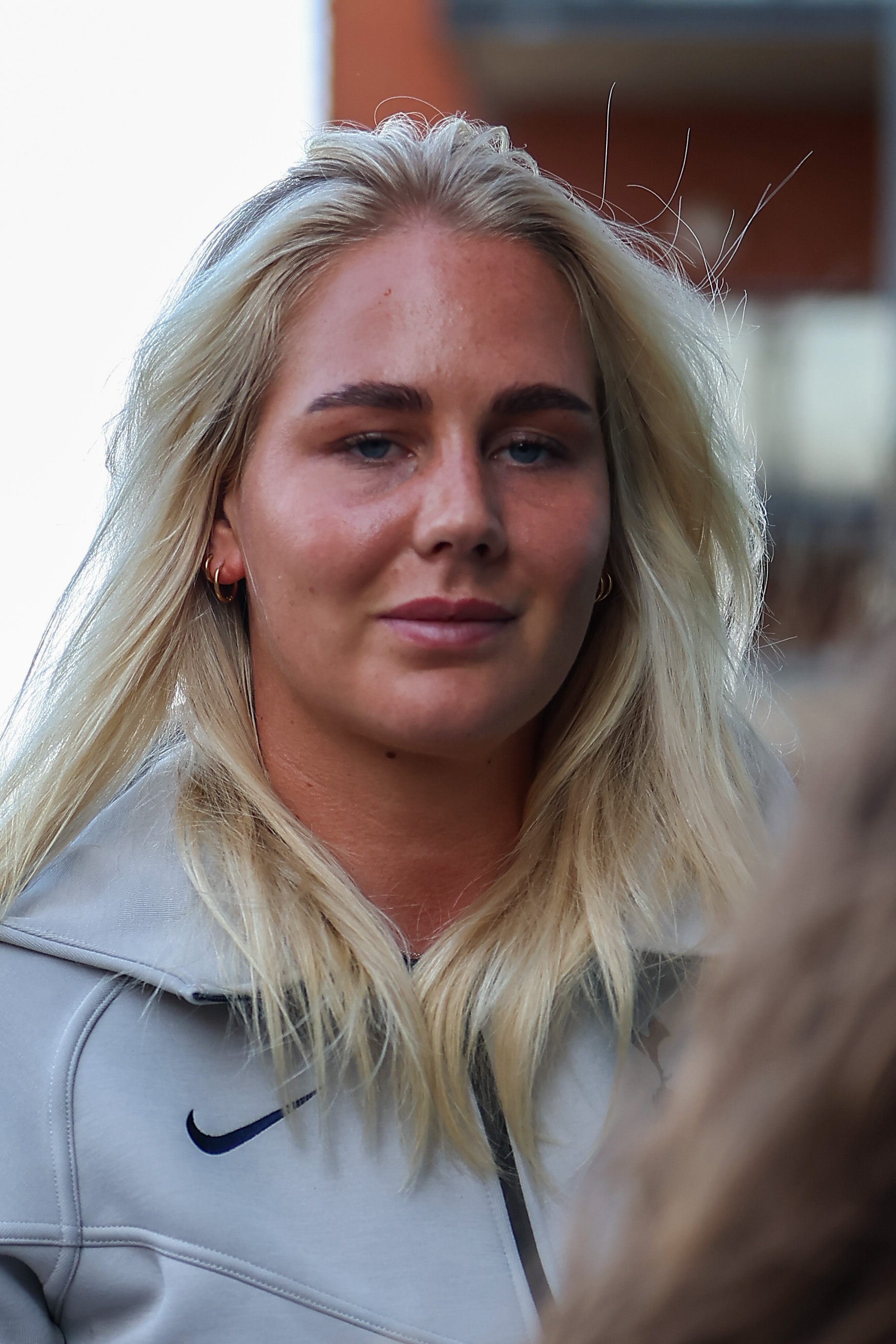
- Tandberg in 2025

Personal information
- Full name: Cathinka Cecilie Friis Tandberg
- Date of birth: 18 June 2004 (age 22)
- Place of birth: Oslo, Norway
- Height: 1.76 m (5 ft 9 in)
- Position: Forward

Team information
- Current team: Tottenham Hotspur
- Number: 9

Youth career
- 2017–2018: Heming
- 2018–2019: Stabæk

Senior career*
| Years | Team | Apps | (Gls) |
| 2019 | Stabæk 2 | 9 | (1) |
| 2020–2022 | Lyn | 55 | (5) |
| 2023–2024 | Linköping | 39 | (23) |
| 2024–2025 | Hammarby IF | 21 | (12) |
| 2025– | Tottenham Hotspur | 21 | (6) |

International career^{‡}
| 2019 | Norway U15 | 4 | (0) |
| 2020 | Norway U16 | 3 | (1) |
| 2021–2023 | Norway U19 | 25 | (11) |
| 2023– | Norway U23 | 3 | (0) |
| 2023– | Norway | 9 | (0) |
- * Club domestic league appearances and goals as of 07:48, 14 September 2026 (UTC) ‡ National team caps and goals as of 22:35, 14 October 2026 (UTC)

Cathinka "Tinka" Cecilie Friis Tandberg (Norwegian: [kɑˈtɪŋkɑ sɛˈsiːlɪə ˈfɾiːs ˈtɑnˌbærɡ]; born 18 June 2004) is a Norwegian professional footballer who plays as a forward for Women's Super League club Tottenham Hotspur and the Norway national team.

== Early life ==
She started her youth career at age 5 in IL Heming, and played with various boys' teams. When starting to play on the girls' team, it was the team for players born in 2001. In 2018, she moved to Stabæk, but did not yet make it to the first team. She moved to Lyn in 2020 and was given a place in the senior team, while attending Wang sport school from age 16.

== Club career ==
=== Linköping ===
Ahead of the 2023 season, she moved abroad to Damallsvenskan, the Swedish title challengers Linköpings FC. She performed well throughout the season. In November 2023, she scored 6 goals in a match against IFK Kalmar.

=== Hammarby IF ===
In August 2024, she signed with Swedish club Hammarby IF a contract during the summer transfer window until 2027.

=== Tottenham Hotspur ===
On 4 September 2025, Tandberg signed with Tottenham Hotspur in the English Super League. In the first away game of the 2025–26 season, Tandberg assisted the first goal and scored the second goal in a 2–0 victory against Everton. Her goal was widely considered spectacular and was shot from 40 yards out.

== International career ==
Following the withdrawals of several players, Tandberg was called up for Norway for the 2023–24 UEFA Nations League matches against France.

== Career statistics ==
=== Club ===
As of match played 13 September 2026

Appearances and goals by club, season and competition
| Club | Season | League | | | National cup (Note: Includes Norwegian Women's Cup, Svenska Cupen, Women's FA Cup) | | League cup (Note: Includes Women's League Cup) | | Continental (Note: Includes UEFA Women's Champions League) | | Total | |
| Club | Season | Division | Apps | Goals | Apps | Goals | Apps | Goals | Apps | Goals | Apps | Goals |
|---|---|---|---|---|---|---|---|---|---|---|---|---|
| Lyn | 2020 | Toppserien | 14 | 0 | 1 | 0 | — | | — | | 15 | 0 |
| Lyn | 2021 | Toppserien | 19 | 2 | 1 | 0 | — | | — | | 20 | 2 |
| Lyn | 2022 | Toppserien | 22 | 3 | 2 | 0 | — | | — | | 24 | 3 |
| Lyn | Total | | 55 | 5 | 4 | 0 | 0 | 0 | 0 | 0 | 59 | 5 |
| Linköpings | 2023 | Damallsvenskan | 26 | 18 | 3 | 4 | — | | — | | 29 | 22 |
| Linköpings | 2024 | Damallsvenskan | 13 | 4 | 3 | 4 | — | | 1 | 0 | 17 | 8 |
| Linköpings | Total | | 39 | 22 | 6 | 8 | 0 | 0 | 1 | 0 | 46 | 30 |
| Hammarby IF | 2024 | Damallsvenskan | 12 | 11 | 0 | 0 | — | | 8 | 3 | 20 | 14 |
| Hammarby IF | 2025 | Damallsvenskan | 11 | 1 | 4 | 2 | — | | 2 | 2 | 17 | 5 |
| Hammarby IF | Total | | 33 | 12 | 4 | 2 | 0 | 0 | 10 | 5 | 37 | 19 |
| Tottenham Hotspur | 2025–26 | Women's Super League | 19 | 6 | 2 | 0 | 3 | 0 | — | | 24 | 6 |
| Tottenham Hotspur | 2026–27 | Women's Super League | 2 | 0 | 0 | 0 | 0 | 0 | — | | 2 | 0 |
| Tottenham Hotspur | Total | | 21 | 6 | 2 | 0 | 3 | 0 | 0 | 0 | 26 | 6 |
| Career total | | | 148 | 45 | 16 | 10 | 3 | 0 | 11 | 5 | 178 | 60 |

=== International ===
As of match played 13 October 2026

Appearances and goals by national team and year
| National team | Year | Apps | Goals |
|---|---|---|---|
| Norway | 2023 | 1 | 0 |
| Norway | 2024 | 4 | 0 |
| Norway | 2025 | 1 | 0 |
| Norway | 2026 | 3 | 0 |
| Total | | 9 | 0 |

== Honours ==
=== Individual ===
- Damallsvenskan top scorer: 2023
- Damallsvenskan Goal of the Season: 2024
- Damallsvenskan Best Striker award: 2024
