= Hanna Wijk =

Swedish footballer (born 2003)

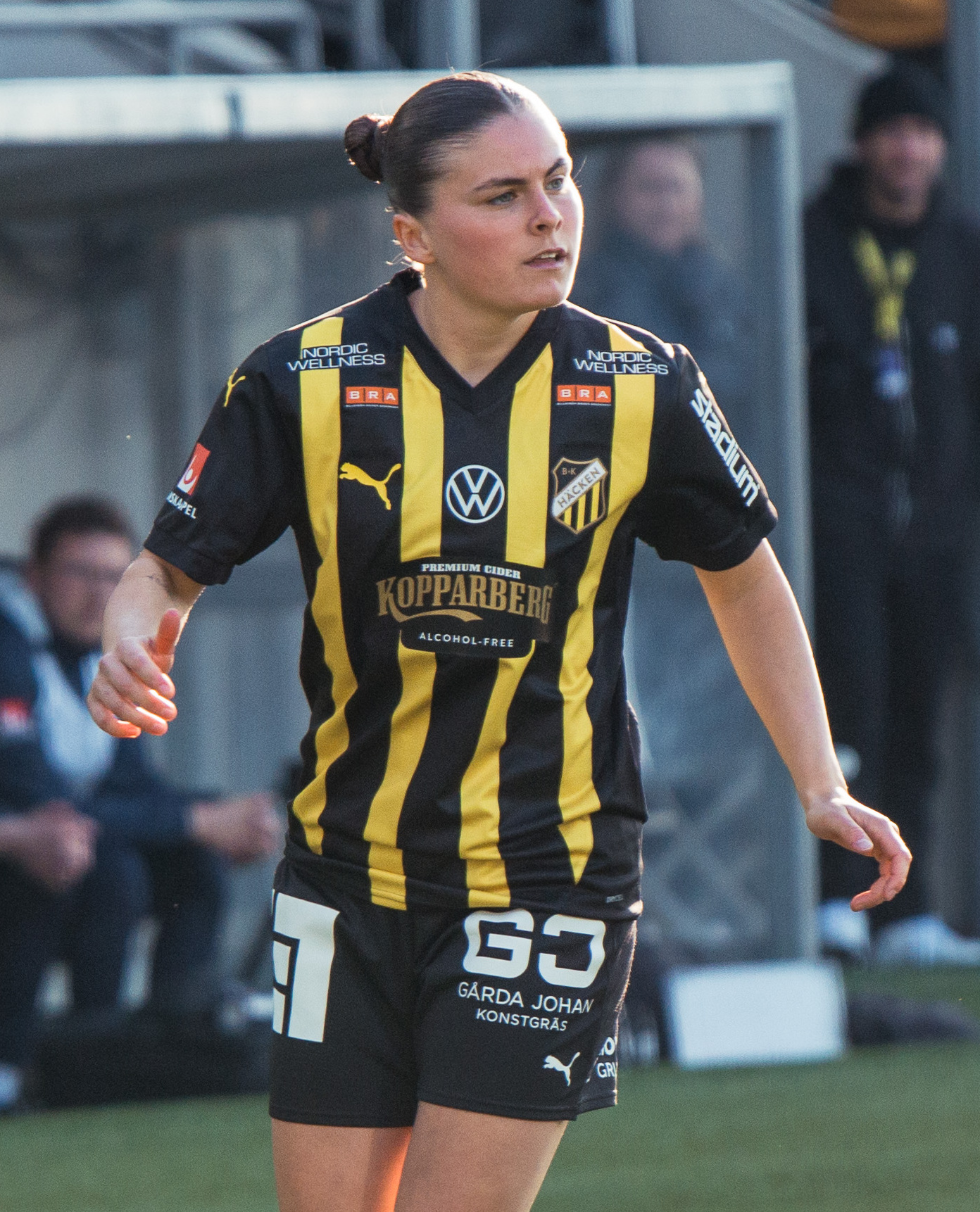
- Wijk with Häcken in 2025

Personal information
- Full name: Hanna Maria Wijk
- Date of birth: 15 December 2003 (age 22)
- Place of birth: Sweden, Lerum.
- Height: 1.67 m (5 ft 6 in)
- Position: Defender

Team information
- Current team: Tottenham Hotspur
- Number: 22

Youth career
- 2013–2015: Floda
- 2015–2020: Lerum

Senior career*
Years	Team	Apps	(Gls)
2020–2026	Häcken	124	(3)
2026–	Tottenham Hotspur	5	(0)

International career^{‡}
2018	Sweden U15	2	(1)
2019	Sweden U16	11	(0)
2020	Sweden U17	3	(0)
2021–2022	Sweden U19	11	(0)
2021–2025	Sweden U23	15	(0)
2024–	Sweden	1	(0)
- * Club domestic league appearances and goals as of 15:21, 17 May 2026 (UTC) ‡ National team caps and goals as of 19 August 2025

Hanna Maria Wijk (Swedish: [ˈhanːa viːk]; born 15 December 2003) is a Swedish professional footballer who plays as a defender for Women's Super League club Tottenham Hotspur and the Sweden national team.

== Club career ==
=== Early career ===
Wijk approached football at age nine, starting her career in the youth teams of Floda BoIF (2013–2015) and Lerums IS (2015–2020), two clubs situated in Lerum Municipality, Västra Götaland County. She remained linked to Lerums IS for five years, wearing the captain's armband and achieving good results in the single-team series, before moving to Kopparbergs/Göteborg in 2020, who later became BK Häcken in January 2021.

=== BK Häcken ===
After a first part of the season played with her under-19 team, Wijk made her debut with the first team, scoring one of the two goals in the victory over Jitex, however she had to wait until July for her debut in Damallsvenskan, coming on in the 68th minute as a substitute for Emma Koivisto in the 4–0 victory over Växjö on matchday 3 of the championship, a tournament that started late due to the restrictions aimed at preventing the spread of the COVID-19 pandemic in Sweden. The team coached by the duo Mats Gren and Jörgen Ericson soon proved to be among the best, with Wijk who, after being in the squad, without taking the field, in the Svenska Cupen match against Linköping, despite still being seventeen years old, received the trust of the coaches by scoring, although often starting from the bench, 17 appearances in the top flight in her debut season, also making two appearances in the UEFA Women's Champions League before the end of the year, both as a starter, in the round of 32 of the 2020-2021 edition in the double challenge with the English team Manchester City. That same year, Wijk and her teammates celebrated winning the club's first Damallsvenskan title, as well as the young player's first trophy in the trophy cabinet.

The following season she remained tied to the club which, after initially taking the decision to dissolve the first team, retraced its steps and before the start of the season reached an agreement with Häcken to become its women's section. Wijk is among the players who join the new team, which with the new colors takes over Kopparbergs/Göteborg in the 2020-2021 edition of the Svenska Cupen, winning the trophy by beating Eskilstuna United in the final with a result of 3–0. Subsequently, with the yellow and black colors of Häcken she played in all editions of the Women's Champions League in 2021–22, with the best result being the quarter-finals in the 2023–24 edition. In March 2021 she extended the duration of her contract by signing a two-year contract, and then renewed it for another two years in May 2023.

=== Tottenham Hotspur ===
On 30 December 2025, Wijk signed with Women's Super League club Tottenham Hotspur to a long term contract.

== International career ==
=== Youth ===
Noted by the Swedish Football Association as a potential new player to include in their youth teams, Wijk was called up in 2018, initially to wear the shirt of the under-15 selection on the occasion of a double friendly match with the same age groups of Norway, against whom she scored the goal of the partial 2–0 in the 6–3 victory of the second match on 23 September, her absolute debut with the national team, and Finland in September and October of that year.

The following year she was called up to the under-16 team first, in April, on the occasion of a semi-official UEFA-sponsored tournament in Slovenia, and subsequently, in July, in the 2019 edition of the Nordisk Flick (Nordic Cup) intended for Scandinavian youth teams, maturing with the subsequent friendly tournaments 11 appearances with this selection facing among others, the United States, Germany and Spain.

In 2020, Wijk would bee aggregated to the U17 squad, having been called up to that squad that faces the MIMA Cup 2020 in San Pedro del Pinatar, Spain, and then moved directly to the U23 squad led by Renée Slegers in 2021, the year in which she matured, again in a friendly, an appearance in the under 18 against Belgium and also begins the call-ups in the under 19. With the largest of the Swedish youth teams between 2021 and 2023 she plays 14 matches, all in friendly tournaments, debuting on 10 June 2021 in the 2–2 draw with France, with the under 19 with the same appearances she scores 3, playing qualifications and the final phase of the UEFA Women's Under-19 Championship in the Czech Republic 2022, with her national team reaching the semi-finals.

=== Senior ===
In the meantime, in September 2022, Wijk also received her first call-up to the senior national team, called up by coach Peter Gerhardsson together with Matilda Vinberg, another new addition to the Swedish squad, for a preliminary training camp, however, she had to wait another two years to materialise in a call-up to an official match, then being used for the first time in the clear 8–0 victory over Luxembourg on 29 October 2024, taking to the field as a starter in the match valid for the qualification for the UEFA Women's Euro 2025 in Switzerland.

== Career statistics ==
=== Club ===
As of match played 16 May 2026

Appearances and goals by club, season and competition
Club	Season	League			National cup (Note: Includes Svenska Cupen, Women's FA Cup)		League cup (Note: Includes Women's League Cup)		Continental		Total	
Club	Season	Division	Apps	Goals	Apps	Goals	Apps	Goals	Apps	Goals	Apps	Goals
BK Häcken	2020	Damallsvenskan	17	0	0	0	—		2 (Note: Appearance(s) in UEFA Women's Champions League)	0	19	0
BK Häcken	2021	Damallsvenskan	10	0	1	0	—		5	0	15	0
BK Häcken	2022	Damallsvenskan	24	1	3	0	—		2	0	29	1
BK Häcken	2023	Damallsvenskan	22	2	4	0	—		7	0	33	2
BK Häcken	2024	Damallsvenskan	26	0	5	0	—		2	0	33	0
BK Häcken	2025	Damallsvenskan	25	0	3	0	—		5 (Note: One appearance in UEFA Women's Champions League; four appearances in UEFA Women's Europa League)	0	33	0
BK Häcken	Total		124	3	16	0	0	0	23	0	163	3
Tottenham Hotspur	2025–26	Women's Super League	5	0	3	0	0	0	0	0	8	0
Career total			129	3	19	0	0	0	23	0	171	3

=== International ===
As of match played 29 October 2024

Appearances and goals by national team and year
National team	Year	Apps	Goals
Sweden	2024	1	0
Total		1	0

== Honours ==
BK Häcken FF

- Damallsvenskan: 2020, 2025
- Svenska Cupen: 2020–21
