= Olivia Holdt =

Danish footballer (born 2001)

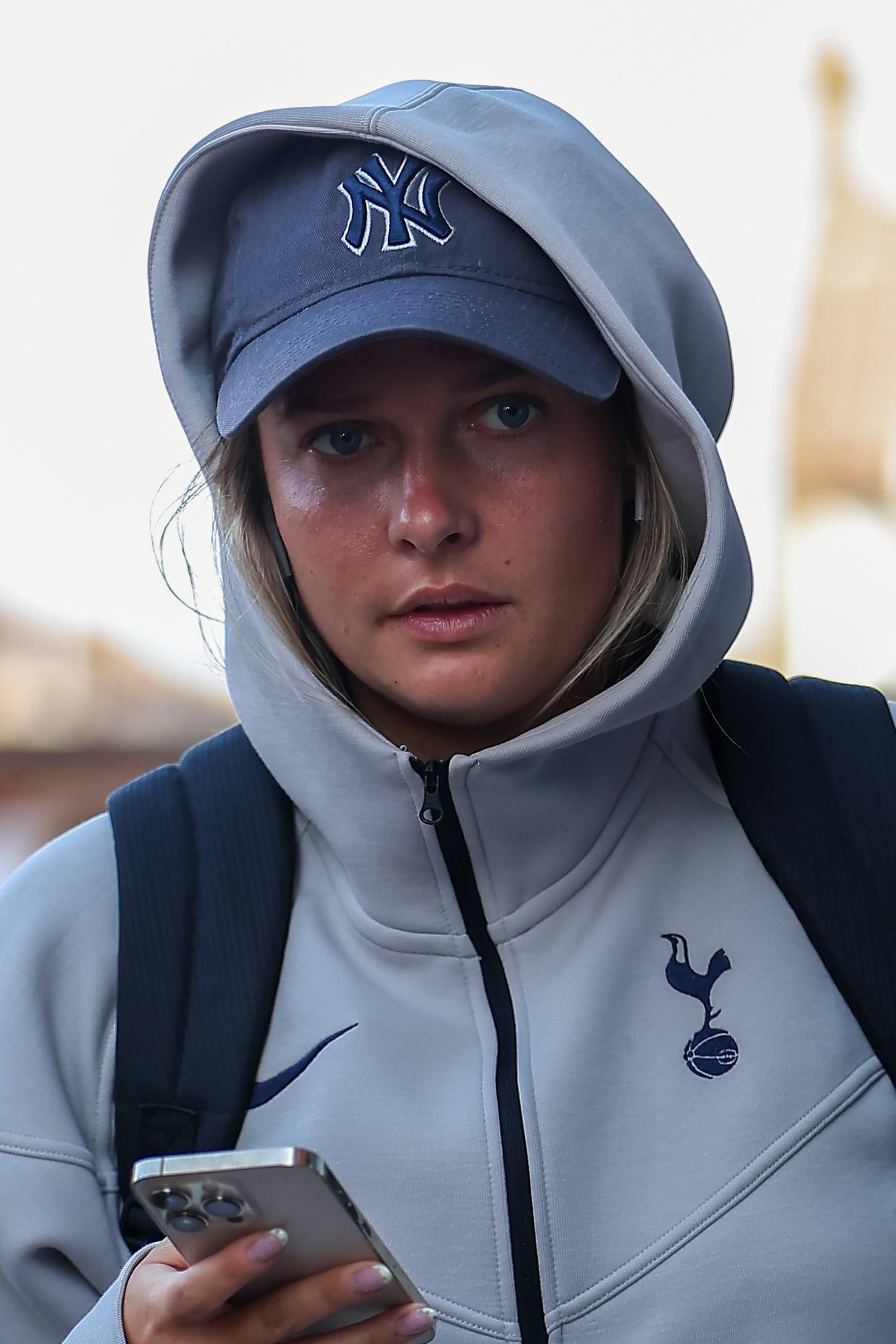
- Holdt in 2025.

Personal information
- Full name: Olivia Møller Holdt
- Date of birth: 7 June 2001 (age 25)
- Place of birth: Ikast, Denmark
- Height: 1.72 m (5 ft 8 in)
- Position: Winger

Team information
- Current team: Tottenham Hotspur
- Number: 11

Youth career
- –2018: Vildbjerg SF

Senior career*
Years	Team	Apps	(Gls)
2019–2020	VSK Aarhus	29	(7)
2020–2022	Fortuna Hjørring	45	(26)
2022–2024	FC Rosengård	47	(25)
2025–	Tottenham Hotspur	34	(9)

International career^{‡}
2016–2017	Denmark U16	14	(3)
2017–2018	Denmark U17	9	(1)
2018–2020	Denmark U19	19	(5)
2019–2024	Denmark U23	3	(2)
2021–	Denmark	10	(2)
- * Club domestic league appearances and goals as of 07:48, 14 September 2026 (UTC) ‡ National team caps and goals as of 04:21, 8 March 2026 (UTC)

Olivia Møller Holdt (Danish: [oˈliˀviæ ˈmølˀɐ ˈhʌlˀt]; born 7 June 2001) is a Danish professional footballer who plays as a winger for Women's Super League club Tottenham Hotspur and the Denmark national team.

Holdt played youth football with Vildbjerg SF before starting her senior career with then-Danish Women's League side VSK Aarhus in 2019. Following one and a half seasons with VSK, Holdt signed with Danish Women's League side Fortuna Hjørring in 2020, where she played for two years and received the Player of the Year award for the 2020/2021 campaign. In 2022, Holdt started playing professionally when she signed with Damallsvenskan side FC Rosengård where she played for two years until 2024, during which the club won the league twice – in 2022 and in 2024. Holdt signed with Women's Super League side Tottenham Hotspur in 2025.

== Club career ==
She was the sixth highest scoring player in the 2019-20 Elite Division.

She was named Player of the Year in the Elite Division 2020–21. Holdt joined Tottenham Hotspur in 2025. She scored a hat-trick in their 0–7 away win against Crystal Palace on 20 September 2026.

== International career ==
She has appeared for the Danish national youth team and Danish national junior team, several times. In 2019, she made her debut for the Denmark national under-23 team, against Netherlands.

Holdt made her debut for the senior Denmark national team on 8 April 2021 against the Republic of Ireland, coming on as a substitute for Signe Bruun. She was also in the squad for the subsequent friendly against Wales.

== Career statistics ==
=== Club ===
As of match played 13 September 2026

Appearances and goals by club, season and competition
Club	Season	League			National cup (Note: Includes Kvindepokalen, Svenska Cupen, Women's FA Cup)		League cup (Note: Includes Women's League Cup)		Continental		Total	
Club	Season	Division	Apps	Goals	Apps	Goals	Apps	Goals	Apps	Goals	Apps	Goals
VSK Aarhus	2018–19	Kvindeligaen	10	1	2	0	—		—		12	1
VSK Aarhus	2019–20	Kvindeligaen	19	6	2	0	—		—		21	6
VSK Aarhus	Total		29	7	4	0	0	0	0	0	33	7
Fortuna Hjørring	2020–21	Kvindeligaen	23	15	2	0	—		4 (Note: Appearances in UEFA Women's Champions League)	0	29	15
Fortuna Hjørring	2021–22	Kvindeligaen	22	11	5	1	—		—		27	12
Fortuna Hjørring	Total		45	26	7	1	0	0	4	0	56	27
FC Rosengård	2022	Damallsvenskan	8	0	0	0	—		8	2	16	2
FC Rosengård	2023	Damallsvenskan	21	12	3	0	—		2	1	26	13
FC Rosengård	2024	Damallsvenskan	18	13	4	3	—		—		22	16
FC Rosengård	Total		47	25	7	3	0	0	10	3	64	31
Tottenham Hotspur	2024–25	Women's Super League	11	1	1	0	0	0	—		12	1
Tottenham Hotspur	2025–26	Women's Super League	21	8	3	0	4	2	—		28	10
Tottenham Hotspur	2026–27	Women's Super League	2	0	0	0	0	0	—		2	0
Tottenham Hotspur	Total		34	9	4	0	4	2	0	0	42	11
Career total			155	67	22	4	4	2	14	3	195	76

=== International ===
As of match played 7 March 2026

Appearances and goals by national team and year
National team	Year	Apps	Goals
Denmark	2021	2	0
Denmark	2022	4	1
Denmark	2024	1	0
Denmark	2025	2	0
Denmark	2026	1	1
Total		10	2

Scores and results list Denmark's goal tally first, score column indicates score after each Holdt goal.

List of international goals scored by Olivia Holdt
No.	Date	Venue	Opponent	Score	Result	Competition
1	8 April 2022	Centenary Stadium, Ta'Qali, Malta	Malta	2–0	2–0	2023 FIFA Women's World Cup qualification
2	7 March 2026	Stadio Romeo Menti, Vicenza, Italy	Italy	1–1	1–1	2027 FIFA Women's World Cup qualification
3	12 October 2026	BMO Field, Toronto, Canada	Canada	1–1	4–3	Friendly
4	12 October 2026	BMO Field, Toronto, Canada	Canada	3–1	4–3	Friendly

== Honours ==
FC Rosengård

- Damallsvenskan: 2022, 2024
- Svenska Cupen: 2021–22

Individual

- Danish Women's League Player of the Year: 2021
