= 2023 Damallsvenskan =

Swedish women's football top division, 2023 season

Damallsvenskan
- Season: 2023
- Dates: 24 March – 11 November 2023
- Champions: Hammarby
- Relegated: IK Uppsala; IFK Kalmar
- Champions League: Hammarby; Häcken
- Matches: 119
- Goals: 360 (3.03 per match)
- Top goalscorer: Cathinka Tandberg (19)
- Biggest home win: Rosengård 10–0 Kalmar; 11 November 2023
- Biggest away win: Kalmar 1–15 Linköping; 5 November 2023
- Highest scoring: Kalmar 1–15 Linköping; 5 November 2023
- Longest winning run: Häcken; Hammarby; Piteå; Vittsjö (6 matches each)
- Longest unbeaten run: Häcken (18 matches)
- Longest winless run: Kalmar (26 matches)
- Longest losing run: IFK Norrköping; Kalmar (9 matches each)
- Highest attendance: 15,033; Hammarby 3–2 Häcken; 5 November 2023
- Lowest attendance: 116; Brommapojkarna 0–6 Häcken; 11 June 2023
- All statistics correct as of 9 July 2023.

The 2023 Damallsvenskan was the 36th season of the Swedish women's association football top division, Damallsvenskan. The league began on 24 March 2023, and ended on 11 November 2023. The league had an eight-week break between rounds 17 and 18 (9 July – 3 September) due to the 2023 FIFA Women's World Cup.

Växjö DFF and IFK Norrköping were new teams for this season after being promoted from Elitettan. Eskilstuna were not granted a licence and replaced in the league by Uppsala.

== Teams ==
Location of teams in 2023 Damallsvenskan

Team	Location	Stadium	Turf	Stadium capacity^{a}
BK Häcken FF	Gothenburg	Bravida Arena	Artificial	6,500
Djurgårdens IF	Stockholm	Stockholm Olympic Stadium	Natural	14,417
FC Rosengård	Malmö	Malmö IP	Artificial	5,700
Hammarby IF	Stockholm	Hammarby IP	Artificial	3,700
IF Brommapojkarna	Stockholm	Grimsta IP	Artificial	5,000
IFK Kalmar	Kalmar	Guldfågeln Arena	Natural	12,000
KIF Örebro DFF	Örebro	Behrn Arena	Artificial	12,624
Kristianstads DFF	Kristianstad	Kristianstads fotbollsarena	Hybrid	3,080^{b}
Kristianstads DFF	Kristianstad	Vilans IP	Natural	5,000^{b}
Linköpings FC	Linköping	Arena Linköping	Artificial	8,500
IFK Norrköping	Norrköping	PlatinumCars Arena	Artificial	17,234
Piteå IF	Piteå	LF Arena	Artificial	6,500
IK Uppsala	Uppsala	Studenternas IP	Artificial	10,000
Växjö DFF	Växjö	Visma Arena	Natural	12,000
Vittsjö GIK	Vittsjö	Vittsjö IP	Natural	3,000

Notes: ^{a} According to each club information page previously available at the Swedish Football Association website for Damallsvenskan, unless otherwise noted. Since May 2018 this is no longer present. Numbers were usually lower than official stadium numbers.
^{b} According to Kristianstads DFF's history web page.

== Standings ==
Pos	Team	Pld	W	D	L	GF	GA	GD	Pts	Qualification or relegation
1	Hammarby (C)	26	18	5	3	60	16	+44	59	Qualification to Champions League second round
2	BK Häcken	26	18	5	3	53	10	+43	59	Qualification to Champions League second round
3	Linköping FC	26	17	5	4	76	30	+46	56	Qualification to Champions League first round
4	Piteå IF	26	16	4	6	44	28	+16	52	
5	Vittsjö GIK	26	15	4	7	44	27	+17	49	
6	Kristianstads DFF	26	13	9	4	48	29	+19	48	
7	FC Rosengård	26	12	9	5	61	32	+29	45	
8	Växjö DFF	26	7	5	14	29	58	−29	26	
9	IFK Norrköping	26	7	3	16	26	33	−7	24	
10	KIF Örebro DFF	26	7	3	16	27	39	−12	24	
11	Djurgårdens IF	26	6	6	14	25	50	−25	24	
12	IF Brommapojkarna	26	4	8	14	30	57	−27	20	Qualification for the relegation play-offs
13	IK Uppsala (R)	26	4	7	15	32	50	−18	19	Relegation to Elitettan
14	IFK Kalmar (R)	26	0	3	23	10	106	−96	3	Relegation to Elitettan

Updated to match(es) played on 11 November 2023. Source: svenskfotboll.se
Rules for classification: 1) Points; 2) Goal difference; 3) Number of goals scored; 4) Head-to-head points; 5) Head-to-head goal difference; 6) Head-to-head away goals scored
(C) Champions; (R) Relegated

== Results ==
Home \ Away	IBP	DIF	HÄK	HAM	KAL	KRI	LIN	NOR	ORE	PIT	ROS	UPP	VÄX	VIT
Brommapojkarna		1–2	0–6	0–0	7–0	0–0	2–5	0–2	1–1	1–4	1–3	2–2	3–2	1–1
Djurgårdens IF	2–2		1–0	0–1	4–0	1–1	1–4	1–1	0–2	0–2	2–1	0–4	0–1	0–3
BK Häcken	4–0	0–1		1–0	3–0	1–0	3–0	1–0	2–1	4–0	0–0	3–1	3–0	1–1
Hammarby	4–1	1–0	3–2		8–0	1–2	1–1	2–1	1–0	0–0	2–2	2–0	6–1	2–0
IFK Kalmar	1–1	0–1	0–3	0–4		2–3	1–15	0–3	0–6	0–2	0–5	1–4	0–1	0–6
Kristianstad	4–1	4–1	0–0	1–1	3–1		1–0	2–1	2–0	4–2	1–1	4–0	3–1	1–6
Linköpings FC	4–0	4–1	0–0	1–3	2–1	3–3		1–0	3–0	3–2	4–1	4–0	6–2	2–1
IFK Norrköping	0–1	3–2	0–1	0–2	3–0	0–2	0–0		0–1	0–1	0–2	2–1	2–1	1–2
KIF Örebro DFF	1–4	1–1	0–2	0–3	4–0	0–4	1–3	1–0		1–0	1–1	1–2	1–2	0–2
Piteå IF	3–0	4–0	0–3	2–1	2–1	1–0	0–0	2–1	1–0		1–0	4–1	5–2	1–0
FC Rosengård	3–1	2–2	2–2	1–5	10–0	2–0	1–3	2–1	2–1	1–1		5–2	7–1	4–0
IK Uppsala	0–0	1–1	0–1	0–2	4–0	2–2	1–3	2–2	0–2	1–2	0–0		1–2	1–2
Växjö DFF	1–0	2–0	0–4	0–1	1–1	0–0	2–4	2–3	1–0	1–1	1–1	2–2		0–1
Vittsjö GIK	2–0	5–1	0–3	0–2	1–1	1–1	2–1	1–0	2–1	3–1	0–2	1–0	1–0	

Source: svenskfotboll.se (in Swedish)
Legend: Blue = home team win; Yellow = draw; Red = away team win.

=== Positions by round ===
The table lists the positions of teams after each week of matches. In order to preserve chronological progress, any matches moved from their original game round are not included in the round at which they were originally scheduled, but added to the full round they were played immediately afterwards. For example, if a match is scheduled for round 13, but then postponed and played between rounds 16 and 17, it will be added to the standings for round 16.

Team ╲ Round	1	2	3	4	5	6	7	8	9	10	11	12	13	14	15	16	17	18	19	20	21	22	23	24	25	26
Hammarby	3	3	1	1	1	1	1	3	3	3	3	3	2	2	2	2	3	3	2	1	1	2	2	2	1	1
BK Häcken	11	5	4	4	3	2	2	2	2	1	1	1	1	1	1	1	1	1	1	2	2	1	1	1	2	2
Linköpings FC	1	1	2	6	7	5	5	5	5	5	4	4	3	3	4	4	2	2	3	3	3	3	3	3	3	3
Piteå IF	8	4	7	5	4	3	3	1	1	2	2	2	4	4	3	3	4	4	4	4	4	5	4	4	4	4
Vittsjö GIK	14	8	8	10	9	8	7	7	6	6	7	7	7	7	7	7	7	5	6	5	5	4	6	6	6	5
Kristianstads DFF	2	6	5	3	2	4	4	4	4	4	6	5	5	6	5	6	6	7	6	6	6	6	5	5	5	6
FC Rosengård	9	12	12	8	6	6	6	6	7	7	5	6	6	5	6	5	5	6	7	7	7	7	7	7	7	7
Växjö DFF	10	14	14	11	10	10	11	9	8	8	8	8	8	8	10	8	8	8	9	10	11	10	10	10	8	8
IFK Norrköping	4	2	3	2	5	7	8	8	9	9	9	11	11	9	8	9	9	9	8	8	9	8	8	8	9	9
KIF Örebro DFF	12	7	9	9	11	11	10	10	11	11	12	12	12	12	11	11	12	11	10	11	10	11	11	11	10	10
Djurgårdens IF	5	9	6	7	8	9	9	11	12	12	11	9	9	10	9	10	10	10	11	9	8	9	9	9	11	11
IF Brommapojkarna	6	10	11	12	12	13	13	13	13	13	13	13	13	13	13	13	13	13	13	13	13	12	13	12	12	12
IK Uppsala	7	11	10	13	13	12	12	12	10	10	10	10	10	11	12	12	11	12	12	12	12	13	12	13	13	13
IFK Kalmar	13	13	13	14	14	14	14	14	14	14	14	14	14	14	14	14	14	14	14	14	14	14	14	14	14	14

Leader and Champions League second round
Champions League second round
Champions League first round
Relegation play-offs
Elitettan

=== Results by round ===
Team ╲ Round	1	2	3	4	5	6	7	8	9	10	11	12	13	14	15	16	17	18	19	20	21	22	23	24	25	26
IF Brommapojkarna	D	L	D	L	L	L	L	D	L	W	L	L	L	D	D	D	L	L	D	L	D	W	L	W	L	W
Djurgårdens IF	W	L	W	L	L	D	L	L	L	L	W	W	L	L	D	L	L	D	L	W	W	D	D	D	L	L
BK Häcken	L	W	W	W	W	W	W	D	W	W	W	W	W	D	W	W	W	D	D	L	W	D	W	W	L	W
Hammarby	W	W	W	W	W	W	L	L	D	D	W	W	W	W	W	D	D	W	W	W	W	L	W	D	W	W
IFK Kalmar	L	L	D	L	L	L	L	L	L	L	D	L	L	L	L	L	D	L	L	L	L	L	L	L	L	L
Kristianstads DFF	W	L	W	W	W	L	W	D	W	D	L	W	W	D	W	L	D	D	W	W	D	W	W	D	D	D
Linköpings FC	W	W	D	L	L	W	W	W	L	W	W	W	W	W	D	W	W	W	D	W	L	W	W	D	W	D
IFK Norrköping	W	W	D	W	L	L	L	L	L	L	L	L	L	W	D	L	W	L	W	L	L	W	D	L	L	L
KIF Örebro DFF	L	W	L	L	L	L	W	D	L	L	L	L	W	L	D	L	L	W	W	L	W	L	L	D	W	L
Piteå IF	D	W	D	W	W	W	W	W	W	L	W	D	L	W	W	W	D	W	L	W	L	L	W	W	W	L
FC Rosengård	D	L	L	W	W	W	W	D	D	W	W	D	W	W	D	W	L	L	D	W	D	D	L	W	D	W
IK Uppsala	D	L	D	L	L	D	L	W	W	D	L	D	L	L	L	L	D	D	L	L	L	L	W	L	L	W
Växjö DFF	L	L	L	W	W	L	L	W	W	D	L	D	L	L	L	W	D	L	L	L	D	W	L	D	W	L
Vittsjö GIK	L	W	L	L	W	W	W	D	W	W	D	L	W	D	L	W	W	W	W	W	W	D	L	L	W	W

Source: svenskfotboll.se (in Swedish)
W = Win; D = Draw; L = Lose

== Relegation play-offs ==
Brommapojkarna won the relegation play-offs and was not relegated.

Team 1	Agg.	Team 2	1st leg	2nd leg
Alingsås	0–6	IF Brommapojkarna	0–0	0–6

== Player statistics ==
=== Top scorers ===
Rank	Player	Club	Goals
1	(Norway) Cathinka Tandberg	Linköping	19
2	(Sweden) Cornelia Kapocs	Linköping	18
3	(Nigeria) Anam Imo	Piteå	15
3	(Japan) Yuka Momiki	Linköping	15
5	(Denmark) Olivia Holdt	FC Rosengård	12
5	(Sweden) Madelen Janogy	Hammarby IF	12
5	(Sweden) Rosa Kafaji	BK Häcken	12
5	(Sweden) Olivia Schough	FC Rosengård	12
5	(Canada) Evelyne Viens	Kristianstad	12

=== Top assists ===
Rank	Player	Club	Assists
1	(Sweden) Olivia Schough	FC Rosengård	10
2	(Denmark) Sofie Bredgaard	FC Rosengård	8
3	(Iceland) Hlín Eiríksdóttir	Kristianstad	7
3	(Nigeria) Anam Imo	Piteå	7
3	(Japan) Yuka Momiki	Linköping	7

=== Hat-tricks ===
Player	For	Against	Result	Date
(Canada) Evelyne Viens	Kristianstad	Örebro	4–0 (A)	16 April 2023
(Finland) Heidi Kollanen^{4}	Örebro	Kalmar	6–0 (A)	8 May 2023
(Denmark) Olivia Holdt	Rosengård	Kalmar	5–0 (A)	14 June 2023
(Finland) Jutta Rantala	Vittsjö	Djurgården	5–1 (H)	9 July 2023
(Finland) Inka Sarjanoja	Örebro	Kalmar	4–0 (H)	10 September 2023
(Sweden) Ellen Wangerheim	Hammarby	Rosengård	5–1 (A)	14 October 2023
(Sweden) Klara Folkesson	Uppsala	Kalmar	4–1 (A)	15 October 2023
(Norway) Cathinka Tandberg^{6}	Linköping	Kalmar	15–1 (A)	5 November 2023
(Sweden) Klara Folkesson	Uppsala	Djurgården	4–0 (A)	11 November 2023
(Denmark) Sofie Bredgaard	Rosengård	Kalmar	10–0 (H)	11 November 2023

Notes

^{4} Player scored 4 goals
^{6} Player scored 6 goals
(H) – Home team
(A) – Away team

=== Clean sheets ===
Rank	Player	Club	Clean sheets
1	(Sweden) Jennifer Falk	Häcken	13
2	(Finland) Anna Tamminen	Hammarby	8
3	(United States) Samantha Murphy	Piteå	6
4	(Sweden) Cajsa Andersson	Linköping	5
5	(Sweden) Louise Högrell	Växjö DFF	4
5	(Germany) Melina Loeck	Kristianstad	4
7	(United States) Lainey Burdett	Vittsjö	3
7	(Sweden) Tove Enblom	Örebro	3
7	(Sweden) Sofia Hjern	IFK Norrköping	3
7	(Sweden) Angel Mukasa	FC Rosengård	3
11	(Sweden) Moa Edrud	Hammarby	2
11	(Finland) Milla-Maj Majasaari	IK Uppsala	2
11	(Sweden) Nichole Persson	IF Brommapojkarna	2
14	(Sweden) Elvira Björklund	Djurgården	1
14	(Sweden) Hedvig Lindahl	Djurgården	1
14	(Australia) Teagan Micah	FC Rosengård	1
14	(Sweden) Moa Öhman	Piteå	1
14	(Sweden) Moa Olsson	Kristianstad	1
14	(Sweden) Somea Položen	FC Rosengård	1
14	(Sweden) Elin Vaughan	Vittsjö	1

=== Discipline ===
==== Player ====
- Most yellow cards: 10
  - (Australia) Katrina Gorry (Vittsjö)
- Most red cards: 1
  - (Ghana) Portia Boakye (Djurgården)
  - (Slovakia) Patrícia Fischerová (Kalmar)
  - (Sweden) Hanna Ekengren (Vittsjö)
  - (Sweden) Madelen Janogy (Hammarby)
  - (Sweden) Emilia Pelgander (Örebro)

==== Club ====
- Most yellow cards: 20
  - Djurgården
- Most red cards: 1
  - Djurgården
  - Hammarby
  - Kalmar
  - Örebro
  - Vittsjö
