= Selma Panengstuen =

Norwegian footballer (born 2003)

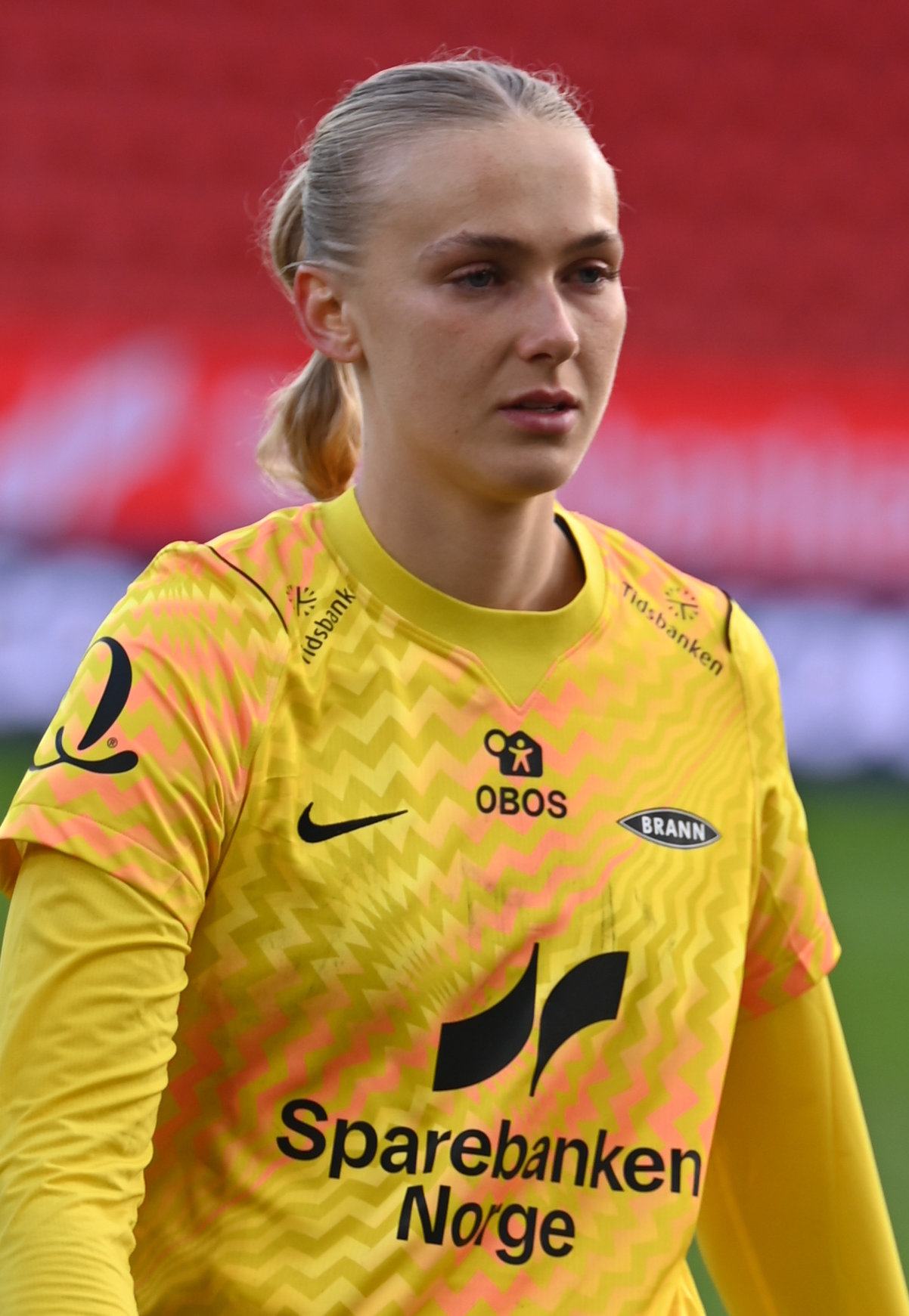
- Panengstuen with Brann in 2026

Personal information
- Date of birth: 5 March 2003 (age 23)
- Position: Goalkeeper

Team information
- Current team: Tottenham Hotspur
- Number: 12

Youth career
- Skreia
- Raufoss

Senior career*
Years	Team	Apps	(Gls)
2018–2019	Raufoss	28	(0)
2020–2021	Stabæk	10	(0)
2022–2024	Kolbotn	58	(0)
2025–2026	Brann	19	(0)
2026–	Tottenham Hotspur	0	(0)

International career^{‡}
2018	Norway U15	2	(0)
2019	Norway U16	12	(0)
2020	Norway U17	2	(0)
2021–2022	Norway U19	15	(0)
2021–2024	Norway U23	10	(0)
2025–	Norway	3	(0)
- * Club domestic league appearances and goals as of 6 September 2025 ‡ National team caps and goals as of 14 October 2026

Selma Panengstuen (born 5 March 2003) is a Norwegian professional footballer who plays as a goalkeeper for Women's Super League club Tottenham Hotspur and the Norway national team.

== Club career ==
Panengstuen started out as a midfielder, but had to play in goal during a match in her early teenages. She was promptly selected for the district team as a goalkeeper. Hailing from Skreia, Panengstuen played for the local team before starting her senior career in the largest club in Toten, Raufoss IL. After the 2019 season she moved to Toppserien club Stabæk.

She made her Toppserien debut, but facing insurmountable competition in Stabæk from Sunniva Skoglund, Panengstuen chose to move to Kolbotn in 2022 in the pursuit of more playing time.

Kolbotn were relegated to the 2023 First Division, but won re-promotion. Panengstuen was named as First Division Player of the Year, as the first goalkeeper to win that accolade. Following the 2024 Toppserien, Panengstuen was named in TV 2's Team of the Year. Toppserien title contenders SK Brann seized the opportunity to sign Panengstuen ahead of the 2025 season.

On 30 June 2026, Panengstuen signed with Tottenham Hotspur in the English Women's Super League.

== International career ==
She made her international debut with Norway U15 in 2018, being named woman of the match against Belgium U15. In 2022 she played the 2022 UEFA Women's Under-19 Championship final for Norway U19 against Spain, but conceded one goal from a mistaken pass, and Norway eventually lost 2–1.

Panengstuen was called up to for Norway for the first time by Hege Riise to play the Netherlands and Brazil in late 2022. She was again called up in Leif Gunnar Smerud's first match as acting manager in 2023. Yet another callup came in October 2024, now under coach Gemma Grainger.

On 16 June 2025, Panengstuen was called up to the Norway squad for the UEFA Women's Euro 2025. She made her senior international debut as a half-time substitute against Sweden in June 2025. She kept a clean sheet.

== Personal life ==
Panengstuen is a hobby pop singer.
