= Sweden women's national under-23 football team =

Women's under-23 national association football team representing Sweden

Sweden
- Association: Swedish Football Association (SvFF)
- Confederation: UEFA
- Head coach: Pierre Fondin (acting)
- FIFA code: SWE
First colours	Second colours

First international
- Sweden 2–4 United States (25 February 1990)

The Sweden women's national under-23 football team (Swedish: Sveriges U23-damlandslag i fotboll) represents Sweden in international under-23 women's football.

== Players ==
=== Current squad ===
On 15 October 2025, Pierre Fondin named a squad of 23 players for two friendly matches against Scotland and Germany on 23 and 27 October. On 16 October, Sara Eriksson, Evelina Duljan and Lisa Löwing all withdrew from the squad and were replaced by Agnes Mårtensson, Lucia Duras and Johanna Svedberg, respectively. Matilda Vinberg withdrew on 17 October and was replaced by Hannah Sjödahl, while Wilma Leidhammar withdrew on 19 October and was replaced by Ida Björnberg.

Caps and goals correct as of 27 October 2025, after the match against Germany.

No.	Pos.	Player	Date of birth (age)	Caps	Goals	Club
	GK	Elvira Björklund	20 January 2004 (age 22)	2	0	(Swedish Football Association) Djurgårdens IF
	GK	Ebba Steen	24 July 2004 (age 22)	0	0	(Swedish Football Association) Trelleborgs FF
	GK	Tilde Tortensson	15 February 2005 (age 21)	0	0	(Swedish Football Association) IF Elfsborg
	DF	Bella Andersson	12 July 2006 (age 20)	4	0	(Royal Spanish Football Federation) Real Madrid
	DF	Lucia Duras	13 December 2004 (age 21)	2	0	(Swedish Football Association) Djurgårdens IF
	DF	Agnes Mårtensson	21 June 2005 (age 21)	0	0	(Swedish Football Association) Malmö FF
	DF	Matilda Nildén	10 November 2004 (age 22)	19	4	(Swedish Football Association) BK Häcken
	DF	Bea Sprung	30 January 2005 (age 21)	17	0	(Swedish Football Association) Hammarby IF
	DF	Sofia Reidy	15 March 2004 (age 22)	16	1	(Swedish Football Association) Hammarby IF
	DF	Hanna Wijk	15 December 2003 (age 22)	17	0	(Swedish Football Association) BK Häcken
	MF	Ida Björnberg	31 December 2006 (age 19)	2	0	(Swedish Football Association) AIK
	MF	Elsa Pelgander	2 August 2006 (age 20)	20	0	(Swedish Football Association) Djurgårdens IF
	MF	Emilia Pelgander	3 March 2004 (age 22)	20	0	(Swedish Football Association) FC Rosengård
	MF	Athinna Persson Lundgren	3 April 2003 (age 23)	7	0	(Swedish Football Association) Hammarby IF
	MF	Hannah Sjödahl	26 June 2006 (age 20)	1	0	(Swedish Football Association) Hammarby IF
	MF	Johanna Svedberg	13 July 2003 (age 23)	2	0	(Swedish Football Association) IF Brommapojkarna
	MF	Elin Westlund	17 November 2005 (age 20)	1	0	(Swedish Football Association) Djurgårdens IF
	FW	Nesrin Akgün	31 December 2004 (age 21)	11	0	(Swedish Football Association) BK Häcken
	FW	Alice Bergström	3 February 2003 (age 23)	22	1	(Swedish Football Association) BK Häcken
	FW	Lisa Björk	11 June 2004 (age 22)	4	0	(Swedish Football Association) Linköping FC
	FW	Svea Rehnberg	21 June 2004 (age 22)	1	0	(Swedish Football Association) IFK Norrköping
	FW	Johanna Renmark	2 October 2003 (age 23)	14	2	(Norwegian Football Federation) SK Brann
	FW	Ellen Wangerheim	1 September 2004 (age 22)	9	3	(Swedish Football Association) Hammarby IF

=== Recent call-ups ===
The following players have also been called up to the squad within the past 12 months.

Pos.	Player	Date of birth (age)	Caps	Goals	Club	Latest call-up

== See also ==
- Sweden women's national football team
- Sweden women's national under-17 football team
- Sweden women's national under-19 football team
