= 2021–22 Svenska Cupen (women) =

Football tournament season

2021–22 Svenska Cupen Damer
Tournament details
- Dates: 21 June 2021 – 26 May 2022
- Teams: 78

Final positions
- Champions: FC Rosengård

Tournament statistics
- Matches played: 85
- Goals scored: 387 (4.55 per match)
- Top goal scorer: Henna-Riikka Honkanen (6)
- All statistics correct as of 26 May 2022.

The 2021–22 Svenska Cupen Damer was the 39th edition of the women's association football main cup competition in Sweden. FC Rosengård won the competition after defeating BK Häcken 2–1 at the final.

== Format ==
52 teams from the Division 1 and below entered the first round. The winners will then join the Elitettan teams at the second round, while the Damallsvenskan teams join at the third round

The qualification round starts from June and ends in February, after which the last 16 clubs would be grouped into 4 groups of 4 teams each.

== Calendar ==
Below are the dates for each round as given by the official schedule:

Round	Date(s)	Number of fixtures	Clubs
Qualification round
First round	21 June – 18 August 2021	26	52 → 26
Second round	25 August – 8 September 2021	20	40 → 20
Third round	28 September – 12 October 2021	16	32 → 16
Group stage
Matchday 1	26/27 February 2022	8	16 → 4
Matchday 2	5/6 March 2022	8	16 → 4
Matchday 3	12/13 March 2022	8	16 → 4
Knockout stage
Semi-finals	19/20 March 2022	2	4 → 2
Final	26 May 2022	1	2 → 1

== Qualification round ==
=== First round ===
52 teams from the Division 1 and lower entered this round via their districts qualifications. Matches were played between 21 June and 18 August 2021.

==== Matches ====
21 June 2021	Vimmerby IF	0–6	IFK Värnamo	Vimmerby
19:00 CEST (UTC+2)		Report	Holmberg 10'; Cedefors 29' 61'; Muratovic 32' 72'; Persson 88'	Stadium: Arena Ceosvallen; Attendance: 72; Referee: Linda Eriksson Kartal

7 July 2021	Älmhults IF	3–0	Nättraby GoIF	Älmhult
19:00 CEST (UTC+2)	Ribacke 34' 61' 65'	Report		Stadium: Älmekulla, Älmevallen, Älmhult; Attendance: 80; Referee: Maja Nyberg

22 July 2021	Lödöse Nygård IK	4–1	Nittorps IK	Nygård
19:00 CEST (UTC+2)	Andersson 21'; Heinerås 44'; Olsson 61'; Hektor 73'	Report	Andersson 90'	Stadium: Alevi A Attendance: 102; Referee: Patrik Nilsson

24 July 2021	Halmstads BK	1–3	Eskilsminne IF	Halmstad
14:00 CEST (UTC+2)	Harrysson 61'	Report	Ohlander 64'; Pigg 82'; Widesjö 87'	Stadium: Halmstad Arena P1; Referee: David Weber

26 July 2021	Sunnanå SK	0–1	Team TG FF	Skellefteå
19:00 CEST (UTC+2)		Report	Lustig 20'	Stadium: Electrolux Home Arena; Attendance: 136; Referee: Fardin Nazari

27 July 2021	IK Gauthiod	1–2	Trollhättans FK	Grästorp
19:00 CEST (UTC+2)	Österberg 60'	Report	Skoglund 43'; Aronsson 47'	Stadium: Lunnevi IP A-plan; Attendance: 83; Referee: Christer Johansson

27 July 2021	Gamla Upsala SK	5–1	Vaksala SK	Uppsala
19:00 CEST (UTC+2)	Åkerman 21' 62'; Lundberg 24' 83'; Forsberg 31'	Report	Johansson 36'	Stadium: Gamlis IP; Attendance: 200; Referee: Katrin De Boer

27 July 2021	Sävedalens IF	0–6	Göteborgs DFF	Sävedalen
19:30 CEST (UTC+2)		Report	Egenwall 33' 62'; Bremer 38' 75'; Holmberg 72'; Sæther 87'	Stadium: Vallhamra 1 Gräs; Attendance: 47; Referee: Ina Landin-Liljestrand

27 July 2021	Sandvikens IF	4–6 (a.e.t.)	Västerås BK 30	Sandviken
19:30 CEST (UTC+2)	Sjöberg 8'; Lang 64'; Bimer 73'; Näslund 101'	Report	Norberg 11' 85'; Burström 42' 103' 110'; Eriksson 102+2'	Stadium: Sportvallen; Attendance: 130; Referee: Agnes Emborg

28 July 2021	Dalhem IF	3–1 (a.e.t.)	Stureby FF	Dalhem
14:00 CEST (UTC+2)	Nilsson 45'; Fröberg 106'; Leveau 111'	Report	Riesterer 87'	Stadium: Dalhem IP; Attendance: 56; Referee: Ola Bröms

28 July 2021	Ljusdals IF	1–0	Alnö IF	Ljusdal
19:00 CEST (UTC+2)	Edlund 86'	Report		Stadium: Erik Hamréns plan Attendance: 73; Referee: Michaela Backlund

28 July 2021	IFK Östersund	0–3	Själevads IK	Östersund
19:30 CEST (UTC+2)		Report	Norberg 45'; Nyberg 79'; Melin 87'	Stadium: Jämtkraft Arena; Attendance: 100; Referee: Kjell Wenna

30 July 2021	IF Viken	1–2	Degerfors IF	Åmål
19:00 CEST (UTC+2)	Kjellman 58'	Report	Dahlström 52'; Eriksson 71'	Stadium: Rösvallen; Referee: Joakim Pettersson

31 July 2021	Linköping BK Tinnis	6–2	Rimforsa IF	Linköping
15:30 CEST (UTC+2)	Andersson 1'; Löfstedt 24'; Bramer 25'; Salvesen 44'; Rosenborg 63'; Ståhlberg 66'	Report	Palmkvist 10'; Halvarsson 78'	Stadium: Skarpans IP; Attendance: 40; Referee: Patricia Yacoub

4 August 2021	Infjärdens SK	4–2	Notvikens IK DFF	Roknäs
19:00 CEST (UTC+2)	Namutosi 22' 66'; Blom 50'; Lakso 67'	Report	Nygård 54'; Johansson 85'	Stadium: IVAB Arena; Referee: Johan Nyström

10 August 2021	Sjöbo IF	0–3	Trelleborgs FF	Sjöbo
19:00 CEST (UTC+2)		Report	Lilliehöök 60'; Engbe 61'; Ahlström 82'	Stadium: Sjöbo IP A-plan; Referee: Johan Hansen Ölmedal

10 August 2021	Onsala BK	0–2	Qviding FIF	Onsala
19:00 CEST (UTC+2)		Report	Åkerström 77'; Alexandersson 90+1'	Stadium: Rydets IP A-plan konstgräs Attendance: 100; Referee: Caroline Johannesson

10 August 2021	Örebro SK FK	1–4	Rävåsens IK Karlskoga	Örebro
19:30 CEST (UTC+2)	Unknown 67' (o.g.)	Report	Aspelin 41'; Sahlén 43' 88'; Bergman 85'	Stadium: Behrn Arena; Attendance: 60; Referee: Selma Griberg

11 August 2021	Önnestad BoIF	1–6 (a.e.t.)	Hittarps IK	Önnestad
19:00 CEST (UTC+2)	Unknown 31' (o.g.)	Report	Jönsson 34'; Hansson 91'; Ahlm 104'; Karlsson 106' 113' 118'	Stadium: Önnevallen IP A-plan; Referee: Sofia Wigerup

11 August 2021	Husqvarna FF	4–0	Mariebo IK	Huskvarna
19:00 CEST (UTC+2)	Gasslander 15'; Wigren 72' 74'; Björk 88'	Report		Stadium: Vapenvallen; Attendance: 150; Referee: Alin Piscoran

11 August 2021	Boo FF	2–1	Sollentuna FK	Boo
19:00 CEST (UTC+2)	Steger 21'; Lyxell 57'	Report	Eliasson 68'	Stadium: Boovallen 1 Attendance: 77; Referee: Emanuel Tas

11 August 2021	IK Brage	0–5	Kvarnsvedens IK	Borlänge
19:00 CEST (UTC+2)		Report	Lagerström 40'; Holmberg 54' 83'; Dahlström 73' 90+1'	Stadium: Borlänge Energi Arena Domnarvsvallen; Attendance: 548; Referee: Amanda Davidsson

11 August 2021	IK Tun	2–6	Enskede IK	Tun
19:15 CEST (UTC+2)	Karnehov 23'; Höök 90+1'	Report	Othérus 27'; Özpolat 28' 32'; Jönsson 76'; Thonérfelth 85'; Mattsson 90+2'	Stadium: Rosvalla IP; Attendance: 51; Referee: Ida Kellström

11 August 2021	Öckerö IF	6–0	IK Rössö Uddevalla	Öckerö
20:00 CEST (UTC+2)	T Nilsson 13' 19' 55' 86'; Palm 27'; J Nilsson 40'	Report		Stadium: Prästängen 1 Konstgräs; Referee: Adnan Tongur

11 August 2021	IFK Lidingö FK	3–2	Täby FK	Lidingö
20:15 CEST (UTC+2)	Schwab 20'; Månsson 25' 26'	Report	Roll 64'; Lindqvist 85'	Stadium: Breviks IP 2 Attendance: 100; Referee: Mimmi Damtew

18 August 2021	Sätra SK	1–0	Tyresö FF	Sätra
19:30 CEST (UTC+2)	Nyberg 73'	Report		Stadium: Sätra BP 1 Attendance: 85; Referee: Moa Wettby

=== Second round ===
The 26 winners from the first round plus the 14 Elitettan teams play in this round. Matches are played between 25 August and 8 September 2021.

==== Matches ====
Boo FF	3–0 (awd)	Dalhem IF
	Report

25 August 2021	Ljusdals IF	0–2	Kvarnsvedens IK	Ljusdal
19:00 CEST (UTC+2)		Report	Dahlström 37'; Hjälte 81'	Stadium: Erik Hamréns plan Attendance: 50; Referee: Katrin De Boer

31 August 2021	Öckerö IF	0–3 (awd)	Göteborgs DFF	Öckerö
19:30 CEST (UTC+2)		Report		Stadium: Prästängen 1 Konstgräs

31 August 2021	Enskede IF	0–9	IF Brommapojkarna	Gamla Enskede
20:00 CEST (UTC+2)		Report	Flores 12' 14' 30'; Lindström 24'; Bergkvist 44'; Prakt 63' 78'; Sjösten 74'; Norlin 84'	Stadium: Enskede IP 1 Attendance: 150; Referee: Mimmi Damtew

1 September 2021	Själevads IK	3–3 (a.e.t.) (3–0 p)	Sundsvalls DFF	Ångermanland
18:00 CEST (UTC+2)	Rosén 21'; Norberg 43'; Fahlberg 68'	Report	Strand 5' 24'; Barkemo 85'	Stadium: Själevads IP A-Plan; Attendance: 54; Referee: William Schill
	Penalties
	Norberg (penalty scored); Östman (penalty scored); Fahlberg (penalty scored)		Unknown (penalty missed); Unknown (penalty missed); Unknown (penalty missed)

1 September 2021	Gamla Upsala SK	0–5	IFK Uppsala Fotboll	Uppsala
18:30 CEST (UTC+2)		Report	Toivio 7'; Öhman 21' 42'; Lundin 53'; Barkfeldt 64'	Stadium: Studenternas; Attendance: 100; Referee: Amanda Nylund Karman

1 September 2021	Qviding FIF	0–3	Jitex BK	Gothenburg
19:00 CEST (UTC+2)		Report	Lidström 7'; Linderoth 13' 18'	Stadium: Valhalla 1 Konstgräs; Attendance: 140; Referee: Soroush Mahmoudi

1 September 2021	Trelleborgs FF	1–3	Borgeby FK	Trelleborg
19:30 CEST (UTC+2)	Mahdi 59'	Report	Karlsson 31'; Olsson 35'; Egnér 61'	Stadium: Vångavallen, Trelleborg A-plan; Referee: Alexander Bergqvist

1 September 2021	Team TG FF	0–2	Umeå IK	Umeå
19:30 CEST (UTC+2)		Report	Jerzak 23'; Bah 63'	Stadium: Umeå Energi Arena SOL; Attendance: 277; Referee: Anja Collén

7 September 2021	Linköping BK Tinnis	0–4	IFK Norrköping FK	Linköping
17:45 CEST (UTC+2)		Report	Wiklander 15'; Cajlakovic 30'; Flenhagen 42'; Ravnell 80'	Stadium: Skarpans IP; Attendance: 90; Referee: Linda Eriksson Kartal

7 September 2021	IFK Värnamo	2–3	Husqvarna FF	Värnamo
19:00 CEST (UTC+2)		Report		Stadium: Finnvedsvallen; Referee: Senad Hamula

7 September 2021	Degerfors IF	2–7	Västerås BK30	Degerfors
19:00 CEST (UTC+2)	Eriksson 9' 90+1'	Report	Eriksson 12' 40' 61' 88'; Alfredsson 19'; Hedenström 24'; Norberg 59'	Stadium: Stora Valla; Attendance: 129; Referee: Nicklas Mattsson

7 September 2021	Sätra SK	0–0 (a.e.t.) (4–3 p)	Älvsjö AIK	Sätra
19:45 CEST (UTC+2)		Report		Stadium: Sätra BP 1 Attendance: 75; Referee: Moa Wettby
	Penalties
	Siljeholm (penalty missed); Cespedes (penalty scored); Modin (penalty scored); Vulic (penalty scored); Carlsson (penalty scored)		Bogren (penalty scored); Praneetphonkrang (penalty scored); Frank (penalty scored); Johansson (penalty missed); Forsgren (penalty missed)

8 September 2021	Älmhults IF	3–9	IFK Kalmar	Älmhult
17:30 CEST (UTC+2)	Sthen 6'; Ribacke 14' 65'	Report	Medhammar 5' 7' 13'; Tindell 46' 61' 63'; Asperot 48'; Persson 58'; Halleen 71'	Stadium: Älmekulla 1, Älmevallen, Älmhult; Attendance: 170; Referee: Rafal Posnik

8 September 2021	Lödöse Nygård IK	1–6	Alingsås IF	Nygård
18:00 CEST (UTC+2)	Johansson 61'	Report	Milton 28'; Jensen 40' 42'; Townsend 70'; Johansson 82' 88'	Stadium: Alevi A Referee: Emilia Stensson

8 September 2021	Infjärdens SK	0–3 (awd)	Morön BK	Roknäs
19:00 CEST (UTC+2)		Report		Stadium: LF Arena

8 September 2021	Rävåsens IK Karlskoga	0–4	Mallbackens IF	Karlskoga
19:00 CEST (UTC+2)		Report	Michael 27'; Renberg 77' 89'; Bajramovic 86'	Stadium: Kilsta IP 2 Attendance: 67; Referee: Amanda Davidsson

8 September 2021	Hittarps IK	2–7	Eskilsminne IF	Helsingborg
19:00 CEST (UTC+2)	Strandh 18'; Björklund 55'	Report	Widesjö 14' 36' 78'; Pigg 33' 63'; Olsson 65' 75'	Stadium: Laröds IP A-plan; Referee: Isabelle Svensson

8 September 2021	IFK Lidingö FK	0–1	Bollstanäs SK	Lidingö
19:30 CEST (UTC+2)		Report	Nazeri 81'	Stadium: Lidingövallen 2 Attendance: 95; Referee: Amanda Nylund Karman

8 September 2021	Trollhättans FK	3–6 (a.e.t.)	Lidköpings FK	Trollhättan
19:30 CEST (UTC+2)	Aronsson 17' 36'; Olsson 21'	Report	Murphy 5' 114'; Greulich 13'; Pettersson 72'; Björklund 107' 108'	Stadium: Edsborgs IP; Attendance: 134; Referee: Mehdi Shirazi

=== Third round ===
The 20 winners from the first round plus the 12 Damallsvenskan teams play in this round.

==== Matches ====
28 September 2021	Göteborgs DFF	0–6	BK Häcken	Gothenburg
19:30 CEST (UTC+2)		Report	Jensen 18' 50'; Holmes 36' 80'; Ijeh 61' 73'	Stadium: Valhalla 1 Konstgräs; Referee: Maral Mirzai Beni

28 September 2021	Bollstanäs SK	3–2	IFK Uppsala Fotboll	Upplands Väsby
20:00 CEST (UTC+2)	Öhlund 12'; Öberg 40'; Edefall 89'	Report	Öhman 44'; Gärds 49'	Stadium: Bollstanäs IP 1 Attendance: 69; Referee: Ali Ali

29 September 2021	IFK Kalmar	2–3 (a.e.t.)	Växjö DFF	Kalmar
18:00 CEST (UTC+2)	Tindell 43'; Persson 73'	Report	Karlsson 28'; Nilsson 52'; Kemppi 111'	Stadium: Gröndals IP; Attendance: 88; Referee: Hassan Al-Saqr

29 September 2021	Boo FF	0–5	Djurgårdens IF	Boo
18:45 CEST (UTC+2)		Report	Andersson 31'; Stokki 55' 68'; Lindwall 90'; Ekengren 90+1'	Stadium: Boovallen 1 Referee: Ulrica Löv

29 September 2021	Eskilsminne IF	1–6	Kristianstads DFF	Gothenburg
19:00 CEST (UTC+2)	Olsson 29'	Report	Petrovic 18'; Welin 25' 67'; Sjöström 32'; Rantala 41'; Harrysson 77'	Stadium: Harlyckans IP; Referee: Isabelle Svensson

29 September 2021	Husqvarna FF	0–3	Linköpings FC	Huskvarna
19:00 CEST (UTC+2)		Report	Törnborg 49'; Unknown 60' (o.g.); Simonsson 81'	Stadium: Vapenvallen; Attendance: 450; Referee: Vanja van Beelen

29 September 2021	IF Brommapojkarna	3–2	AIK	Stockholm
19:00 CEST (UTC+2)	Rojas-Flores 27' 48'; Swedman 28'	Report	Jansson 8'; Nildén 18'	Stadium: Hammarby IP; Attendance: 115; Referee: Sofie Borck Janeheim

29 September 2021	Jitex BK	2–1	Vittsjö GIK	Mölndal
19:00 CEST (UTC+2)	Johansson 44'; Linderoth 87'	Report	Unknown 18' (o.g.)	Stadium: Åbyvallen 1 Konstgräs; Referee: Sara Persson

29 September 2021	Kvarnsvedens IK	1–3	Mallbackens IF	Borlänge
19:00 CEST (UTC+2)	Lindén 90+1'	Report	Kivumbi 47'; Skålberg 57'; Bajramovic 74'	Stadium: Ljungbergsplanen; Referee: Hanna Laajanen

29 September 2021	Morön BK	0–1	Piteå IF	Skellefteå
19:00 CEST (UTC+2)		Report	Guillou 36'	Stadium: Skogsvallen IP; Attendance: 141; Referee: Eva Svärdsudd

29 September 2021	IFK Norrköping FK	1–2	Eskilstuna United DFF	Norrköping
19:00 CEST (UTC+2)	Gustafsson 50'	Report	Duras 52'; Nyström 82'	Stadium: PlatinumCars Arena; Attendance: 84; Referee: Erik Karlgren

29 September 2021	Sätra SK	0–3	Hammarby	Sätra
19:00 CEST (UTC+2)		Report	Wangerheim 13'; Vinberg 56'; Thörnqvist 90+3'	Stadium: Sätra BP 1 Attendance: 200; Referee: Moa Wettby

29 September 2021	Västerås BK30	0–7	KIF Örebro DFF	Västerås
19:00 CEST (UTC+2)		Report	Unknown 16' (o.g.); Öhman 26' 34' 61'; Kollanen 30' 55'; Redenstrand 48'	Stadium: Ringvallen IP; Attendance: 50; Referee: Selma Griberg

29 September 2021	Lidköpings FK	1–2	Alingsås IF	Lidköping
19:15 CEST (UTC+2)	Pechersky 3'	Report	Asplund 29'; Milton 90+8'	Stadium: Rådavallen Dinaplanen; Attendance: 53; Referee: Amanda Davidsson

29 September 2021	Själevads IK	1–4	Umeå IK	Ångermanland
19:30 CEST (UTC+2)	Törmä 56'	Report	Sandström 22'; Honkanen 65' 84'; Westman 82'	Stadium: Skyttis IP; Attendance: 97; Referee: Anja Collén

12 October 2021	Borgeby FK	2–4	Rosengård	Bjärred
19:00 CEST (UTC+2)	Olsson 5'; Anker-Kofoed 67'	Report	Sanders 9' 16' 75'; Kullashi 84'	Stadium: Borgeby IP; Attendance: 124; Referee: Amane Kandas

== Group stage ==
The last 16 teams were divided into 4 groups of 4 teams each.

=== Group A ===
Pos	Team	Pld	W	D	L	GF	GA	GD	Pts	
1	FC Rosengård	3	3	0	0	10	0	+10	9	Advance to Semi-finals
2	Linköpings FC (E)	3	2	0	1	8	6	+2	6	
3	Växjö DFF (E)	3	1	0	2	2	7	−5	3	
4	Alingsås IF (E)	3	0	0	3	1	8	−7	0	

Source: Svensk Fotboll
(E) Eliminated

Home \ Away	ALI	LIN	ROS	VAX
Alingsås IF	—	1–4	0–3	—
Linköpings FC	—	—	—	4–1
FC Rosengård	—	4–0	—	3–0
Växjö DFF	1–0	—	—	—

Source: Svensk Fotboll

==== Matches ====
27 February 2022	Alingsås IF	1–4	Linköpings FC	Alingsås
15:00 CEST (UTC+2)	Jensen 14'; De Feo (yellow card) 16'	Report	Lennartsson (yellow card) 22'; Selerud 32'; Vangsgaard 63'; Bredgaard 79' 82'	Stadium: Mjörnvallen; Attendance: 175; Referee: Selma Griberg

27 February 2022	FC Rosengård	3–0	Växjö DFF	Malmö
15:00 CEST (UTC+2)	Persson 35'; Čanković 90+2'; Kullashi 90+3'	Report	Strömgren (yellow card) 28'	Stadium: Malmö IP; Referee: Sara Persson

5 March 2022	Linköpings FC	4–1	Växjö DFF	Linköping
14:00 CEST (UTC+2)	Kapocs 37'; Vangsgaard 46' 63'; Simonsson 75'	Report	Strömgren 29'	Stadium: Linköping Arena; Attendance: 205; Referee: Lovisa Johansson

5 March 2022	Alingsås IF	0–3	FC Rosengård	Alingsås
15:00 CEST (UTC+2)		Report	Larsson 26'; Kullashi 75'; Schough 79'	Stadium: Mjörnvallen; Attendance: 217; Referee: Joseph Matti

12 March 2022	FC Rosengård	4–0	Linköpings FC	Malmö
13:30 CEST (UTC+2)	Seger 49'; Persson 58'; Schough 62'; Larsson 90'	Report		Stadium: Malmö IP; Referee: Oscar Johnson

13 March 2022	Växjö DFF	1–0	Alingsås IF	Växjö
13:30 CEST (UTC+2)	Ijeh 68'	Report		Stadium: Visma Arena; Attendance: 25; Referee: Toni Galic

=== Group B ===
Pos	Team	Pld	W	D	L	GF	GA	GD	Pts	
1	BK Häcken	3	3	0	0	10	2	+8	9	Advance to Semi-finals
2	Kristianstad (E)	3	2	0	1	9	4	+5	6	
3	Örebro (E)	3	1	0	2	10	6	+4	3	
4	Jitex BK (E)	3	0	0	3	0	17	−17	0	

Source: Svensk Fotboll
(E) Eliminated

Home \ Away	HÄK	JIT	KRI	ORE
BK Häcken	—	—	3–1	2–1
Jitex BK	0–5	—	0–4	—
Kristianstad	—	—	—	4–1
Örebro	—	8–0	—	—

Source: Svensk Fotboll

==== Matches ====
26 February 2022	Jitex BK	0–4	Kristianstad	Mölndal
15:00 CEST (UTC+2)		Report	Pridham 1'; Tindell 10' 52'; Viens 90'	Stadium: Åbyvallen; Attendance: 82; Referee: Emil Persson

27 February 2022	BK Häcken	2–1	Örebro	Gothenburg
15:00 CEST (UTC+2)	Larsen 9'; Rubensson 20' (pen.)	Report	Pikkujämsä (yellow card) 20'; Lockwood 44'	Stadium: Bravida Arena; Attendance: 187; Referee: Ulrica Löv

5 March 2022	Kristianstad	4–1	Örebro	Kristianstad
15:00 CEST (UTC+2)	Van den Bulk 4' (pen.); Andradóttir 15'; Tindell 28'; Allanen 38'	Report	Lockwood 84'	Stadium: Kristianstads Arena; Attendance: 143; Referee: Ulrica Löv

6 March 2022	Jitex BK	0–5	BK Häcken	Mölndal
15:00 CEST (UTC+2)		Report	Albertsdóttir 7'; Larsen 67' 72'; Gevitz 88'; Zomers 90+1'	Stadium: Åbyvallen; Referee: Maral Mirzai Beni

13 March 2022	Örebro	8–0	Jitex BK	Örebro
13:00 CEST (UTC+2)	Wickenheiser 9'; Hellstrom 27' 47'; Kollanen 30' 40'; Kovacs 62'; Öhman 67'; Pikkujämsä 87'	Report		Stadium: Behrn Arena; Attendance: 154; Referee: Lovisa Johansson

13 March 2022	BK Häcken	3–1	Kristianstad	Gothenburg
13:00 CEST (UTC+2)	Gejl 8'; Kaneryd 10' 64'	Report	Pridham 40'	Stadium: Bravida Arena; Attendance: 314; Referee: Maral Mirzai Beni

=== Group C ===
Pos	Team	Pld	W	D	L	GF	GA	GD	Pts	
1	Eskilstuna United DFF	3	2	1	0	4	2	+2	7	Advance to Semi-finals
2	Djurgårdens IF (E)	3	1	2	0	3	0	+3	5	
3	Piteå IF (E)	3	1	1	1	6	2	+4	4	
4	Mallbackens IF (E)	3	0	0	3	1	10	−9	0	

Source: Svensk Fotboll
(E) Eliminated

Home \ Away	DIF	ESK	MAL	PIT
Djurgårdens IF	—	—	—	0–0
Eskilstuna United DFF	0–0	—	—	2–1
Mallbackens IF	0–3	1–2	—	—
Piteå IF	—	—	5–0	—

Source: Svensk Fotboll

==== Matches ====
27 February 2022	Eskilstuna United DFF	2–1	Piteå IF	Eskilstuna
16:00 CEST (UTC+2)	Nyström 72'; Jalkerud 88'	Report	Guillou 19'; Johansson (yellow card) 80'	Stadium: Tunavallen; Attendance: 230; Referee: Mohammadreza Faghani

27 February 2022	Mallbackens IF	0–3	Djurgårdens IF	Lysvik
16:00 CEST (UTC+2)	Berger (yellow card) 62'	Report	Almqvist 10'; Motlhalo 37'; Lindwall 90+3'	Stadium: Strandvallen; Referee: Sofie Borck Janeheim

6 March 2022	Mallbackens IF	1–2	Eskilstuna United DFF	Lysvik
12:00 CEST (UTC+2)	Renberg 75'	Report	Rogic 14' 82'	Stadium: Strandvallen; Referee: Selma Griberg

6 March 2022	Djurgårdens IF	0–0	Piteå IF	Stockholm
16:15 CEST (UTC+2)		Report		Stadium: Stockholm Olympic Stadium; Attendance: 35; Referee: Sofie Borck Janeheim

13 March 2022	Piteå IF	5–0	Mallbackens IF	Piteå
13:00 CEST (UTC+2)	Guillou 11'; F. Andersson 16' (pen.); Imo 32' 56' 71'	Report		Stadium: LF Arena; Attendance: 153; Referee: Joel Bäckström

13 March 2022	Eskilstuna United DFF	0–0	Djurgårdens IF	Eskilstuna
13:00 CEST (UTC+2)		Report		Stadium: Tunavallen; Attendance: 427; Referee: Ulrica Löv

=== Group D ===
Pos	Team	Pld	W	D	L	GF	GA	GD	Pts	
1	Hammarby	3	3	0	0	18	2	+16	9	Advance to Semi-finals
2	Umeå IK (E)	3	2	0	1	15	4	+11	6	
3	IF Brommapojkarna (E)	3	1	0	2	3	8	−5	3	
4	Bollstanäs SK (E)	3	0	0	3	0	22	−22	0	

Source: Svensk Fotboll
(E) Eliminated

Home \ Away	BOL	BRO	HAM	UME
Bollstanäs SK	—	—	0–11	0–9
IF Brommapojkarna	2–0	—	—	—
Hammarby	—	4–0	—	3–2
Umeå IK	—	4–1	—	—

Source: Svensk Fotboll

==== Matches ====
27 February 2022	Bollstanäs SK	0–9	Umeå IK	Upplands Väsby
14:00 CEST (UTC+2)		Report	Kosola 8'; Miettunen 18'; Åberg-Zingmark 32'; Mellouk 36' (pen.) 69'; Honkanen 46' 52' 56'; Dahlkvist 53'	Stadium: Bollstanäs IP; Attendance: 43; Referee: Hanna Laajanen

27 February 2022	Hammarby	4–0	IF Brommapojkarna	Stockholm
15:00 CEST (UTC+2)	Folkesson 3'; Jansson 23'; Hasund 56' 68' (pen.)	Report	Andrup (yellow card) 50'	Stadium: Hammarby IP; Attendance: 723; Referee: Lovisa Johansson

5 March 2022	Bollstanäs SK	0–11	Hammarby	Upplands Väsby
14:00 CEST (UTC+2)		Report	Janogy 1' 44'; Larsson 9' 87'; Hasund 19'; Wangerheim 39' 56' 71'; Vinberg 42'; Jansson 59'; Westin 83'	Stadium: Bollstanäs IP; Attendance: 322; Referee: Hanna Laajanen

6 March 2022	Umeå IK	4–1	IF Brommapojkarna	Umeå
15:00 CEST (UTC+2)	Mellouk 32'; Björk 36'; Honkanen 57' 87'	Report	Wärulf 55'	Stadium: Umeå Energi Arena; Attendance: 120; Referee: Anastasia Oberlauf Poopuu

13 March 2022	Hammarby	3–2	Umeå IK	Stockholm
14:00 CEST (UTC+2)	Hasund 3'; Vinberg 47'; Janogy 82'	Report	Honkanen 39'; Mellouk 85'	Stadium: Hammarby IP; Attendance: 457; Referee: Sara Wiinikka

13 March 2022	IF Brommapojkarna	2–0	Bollstanäs SK	Vällingby
14:00 CEST (UTC+2)	Thörnqvist 11' 47'	Report		Stadium: Grimsta IP; Attendance: 107; Referee: Anastasia Oberlauf Poopuu

== Knockout stage ==
Semi-finals
19 March 2022
Hammarby	1
BK Häcken	2
20 March 2022
FC Rosengård	1
Eskilstuna DFF	0

Final
26 May 2022
BK Häcken	1
FC Rosengård	2

=== Semi-finals ===
19 March 2022	Hammarby	1–2 (a.e.t.)	BK Häcken	Stockholm
13:00 CEST (UTC+2)	Vinberg 12'	Report	Larsen 42'; Kaneryd 109'	Stadium: Hammarby IP; Attendance: 905; Referee: Lovisa Johansson

20 March 2022	FC Rosengård	1–0	Eskilstuna DFF	Malmö
13:00 CEST (UTC+2)	Larsson 15'	Report		Stadium: Malmö IP; Referee: Sara Persson

=== Final ===
26 May 2022	FC Rosengård	2–1 (a.e.t.)	BK Häcken	Malmö
13:00 CEST (UTC+2)	Sprung 62'; Sanders 109'	Report	Kaneryd 8'	Stadium: Malmö IP; Attendance: 1,839; Referee: Sara Persson

== Statistics ==
=== Top scorers ===
As of 26 May 2022

Rank	Player	Club	Goals
1	(Finland) Henna-Riikka Honkanen	Umeå	6
2	(Norway) Vilde Hasund	Hammarby	4
2	(Sweden) Johanna Rytting Kaneryd	Häcken	4
2	(Denmark) Stine Larsen	Häcken	4
2	(Sweden) Sarah Mellouk	Umeå	4
6	(Nigeria) Anam Imo	Piteå	3
6	(Sweden) Madelen Janogy	Hammarby	3
6	(Sweden) Mimmi Larsson	Rosengård	3
6	(Denmark) Amalie Jørgensen Vangsgaard	Linköping	3
6	(Sweden) Matilda Vinberg	Hammarby	3
6	(Sweden) Ellen Wangerheim	Hammarby	3
