= History of Scania =

Modern day region in Sweden

For hundreds of years up until the 18th century, the history of the province of Scania was marked by the struggle between the two Scandinavian kingdoms of Denmark and Sweden over the hegemony in the Baltic area.

== Viking age ==
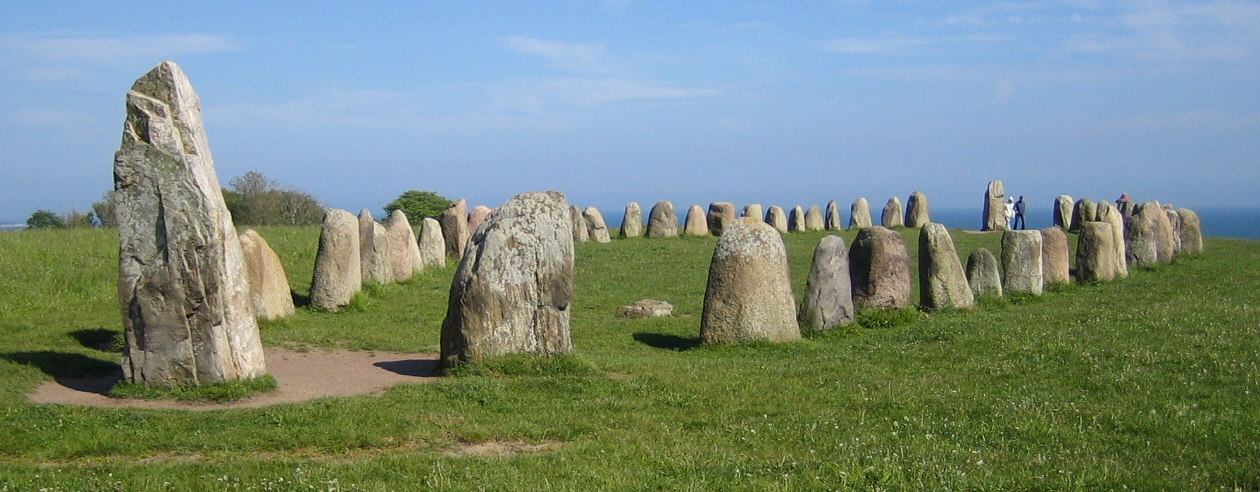
Ale's Stones, a stone ship (burial monument) from c. 500 AD on the coast at Kåseberga, around ten kilometres south east of Ystad in southern Scania

It was previously thought that society in Scania, like in the rest of Scandinavia, was made up of mostly Fen farmers and cattle farmers, thralls, the farmer being free and equal, and having their say at the Things in the affairs of society. Archeological findings on Jutland, the Danish islands, and on the Scanian plains have modified this picture. It has now become clear that the distribution of wealth, at least from the early Migration Period, was very uneven. The plains were to a large extent divided up between large farms which were far bigger than smallholdings, and were often grouped in villages. Subsequently, only a small faction of the population can be presumed to have enjoyed full civic rights. It seems now more likely that this society ought to be perceived as a system of tribes, each led by chieftains, in Danish often called godes, whose authority depended on the size and wealth of the tribe. Scania had 5 main tribes each having had their own Thanes (leaders), and their own group of warriors, all under the command of the King of Scania.

== After Christianization ==
While it was long thought that a period of domestic colonization with Scania started before the Viking Age, it seems like it largely took place after the Viking Age, when donations of land to monasteries led to influences from Continental Europe. This led to a transition from a predominantly animal husbandry-based society to one of farming, which entailed extensive land clearing, possibly also connected with the liberation of the thralls, that led to the creation of many new settlements with names ending in -torp, -rup, and -rød.

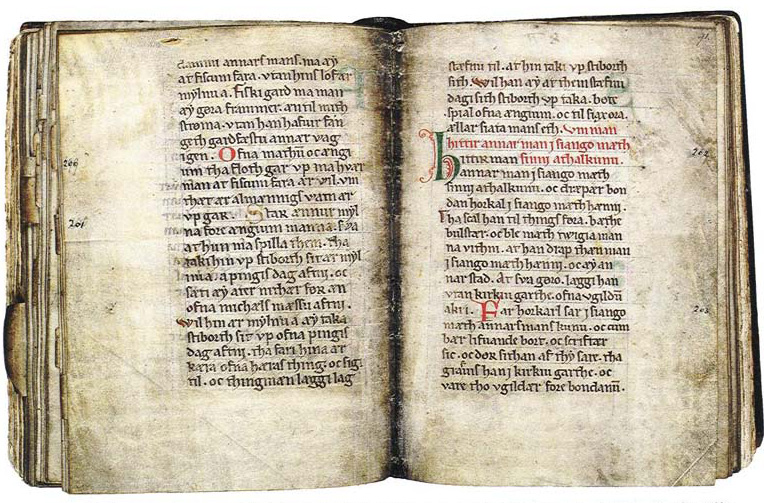
The oldest known manuscript with the Scanian Law, dating to the 13th century.

Scania was first mentioned in written texts in the 8th century, stating that it was a part of Denmark. According to the Large Jelling Stone, Scanians, like all Danes were Christianized by the King of all Danes, Harald Bluetooth before this stone was raised, presumably around 985 AD.

The Scanian law, the oldest of the Medieval Scandinavian laws, came into force in the beginning of the 13th century. It is remarkable in the sense that it exists written in both Latin letters (not in Latin though) as well as Runes, Codex runicus. Already in 1060 was Dalby Church build by Svend Estridsen, as one of the first Danish churches made of stone. Between 1104 and 1536, Lund was the Archbishopric of Denmark, and the Danish National Banner, Dannebrog, was preserved in the Cathedral for several centuries.

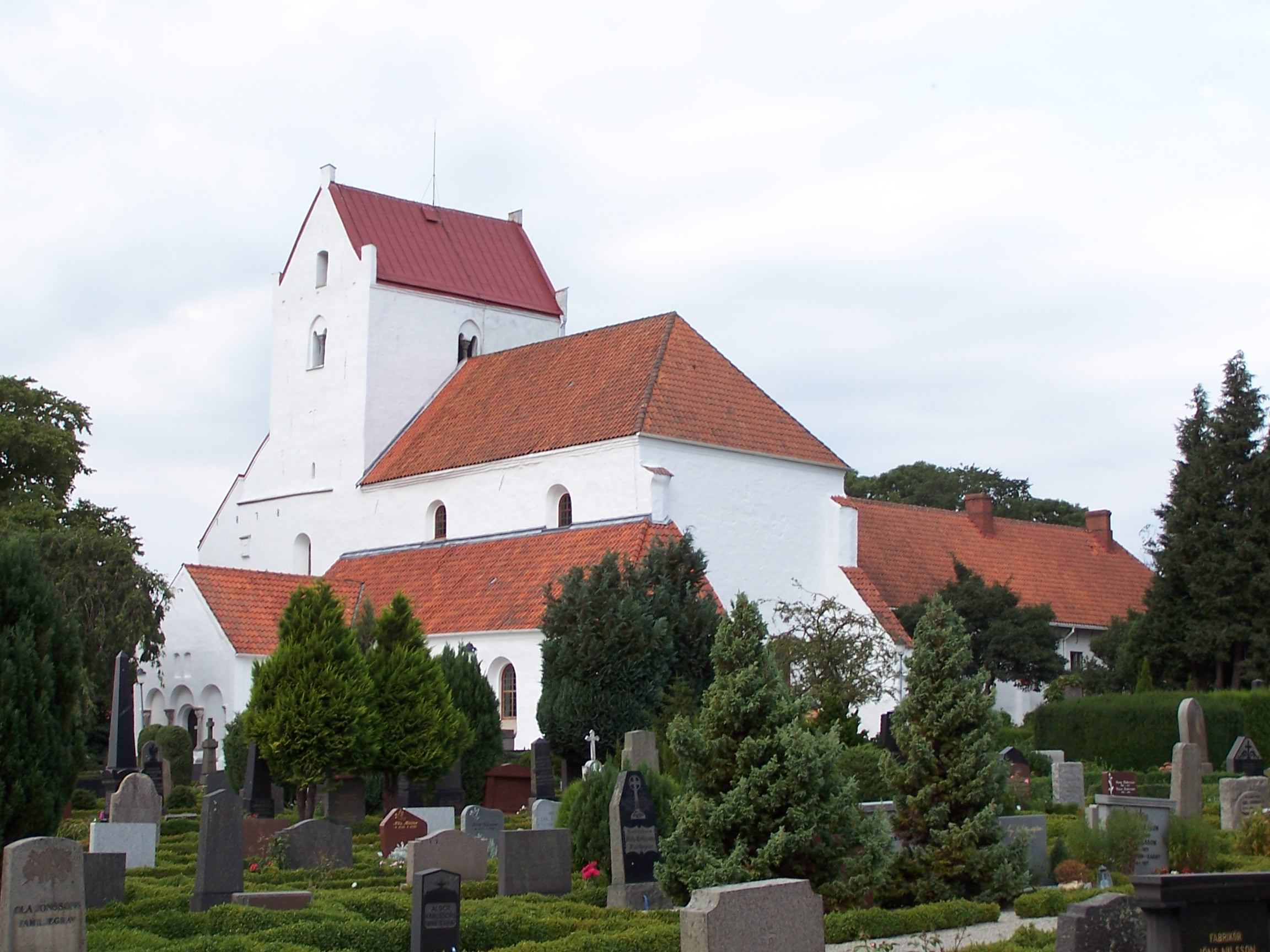
The Holy Cross Church in Dalby.

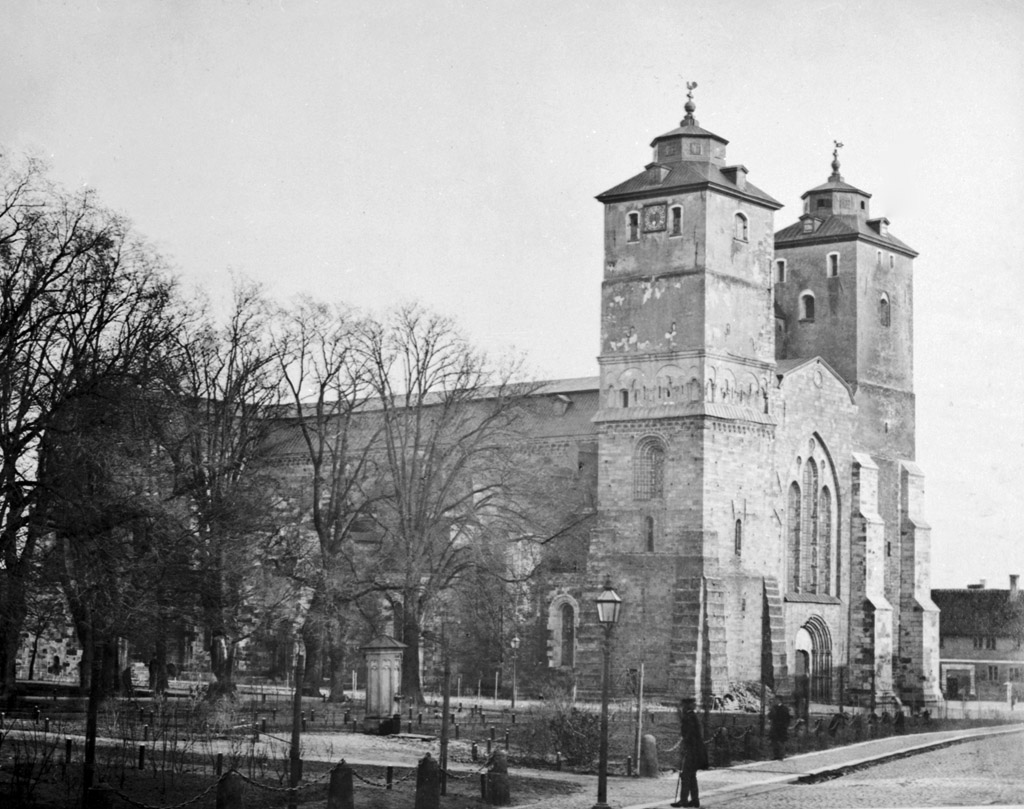
Lund Cathedral in around 1870, before changes were made to the western end of the building.

In 1332 the lands of the eastern Danish provinces, which included Scania, Blekinge and Ven were sold to King Magnus IV of Sweden by Duke Johan of Holstein (who had received the provinces from the Danish king), after the local population expressed dissatisfaction with Duke Johan and stated they would rather be ruled by the Swedes. The Duke started negotiations with the Swedes and it was agreed that the Swedish king would redeem the pledge for 34,000 marks of silver (6 432 kilo). The province was later reconquered by the Danish king Valdemar IV of Denmark in 1360, as part of his conquest campaign to regain previously lost Danish territory. During parts of the Middle Ages, Scania was known throughout Northern Europe for its herring and the market where it was sold.

== 14th and 15th centuries ==
In the middle of the 14th century, the Black Death affected the area as much as in most of Europe. Generally the population declined by a third or more. By the end of this century, the Kalmar Union rose as an attempt to counter the Hanseatic League. The Union was largely a creation of Queen Margaret who had become Queen in Denmark and Norway in 1387, as her only son, King Olaf II of Denmark and IV of Norway died. And two years later she helped the Swedes to get rid of the disliked Albert of Mecklenburg. Her adopted son Boguslaw, actual son of a Polish-Pomeranian Duke, was given the name Eric of Pomerania, as he was crowned King of all three Scandinavian countries on 17 June 1397 in Kalmar, hence the name of the Union. Queen Margaret, remained as the de facto ruler of the three kingdoms more or less until her death in 1412. King Eric founded the Scanian Town, which today is known as Landskrona at the central part of the all Danish Öresund, and introduced the Sound Dues in 1429, which was to last until 1857 (with exception of Swedish ships between 1658 and 1720). By this he secured a large stable income for his kingdom that made it relatively rich and which made the town of Elsinore (Helsingør) flowering. In the Franciscan monastery at Lund, "the Academy" was established in 1425. It was a kind of medieval university, but was closed when the Reformation reached Denmark in 1536.

== Renaissance and final Danish rule ==
=== Golden age of the aristocracy ===
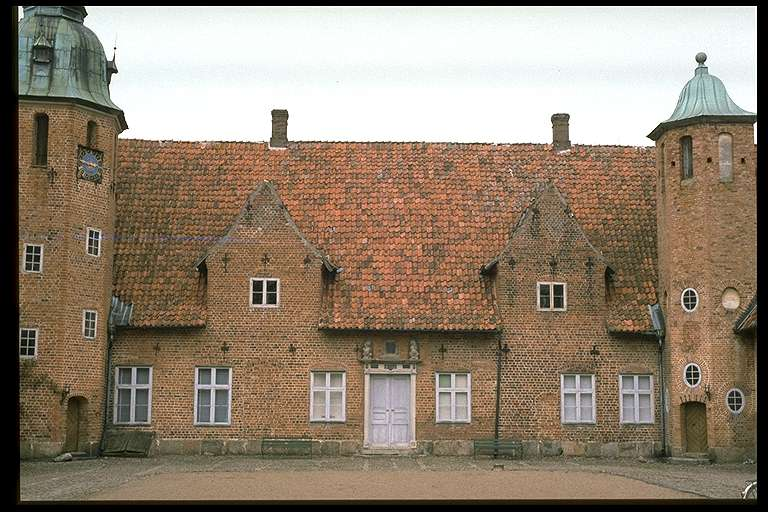
Rosendal Castle whose foundation was laid in 1615 by Anders Stensson Bille på Råbelöv, a Councillor of the Realm.

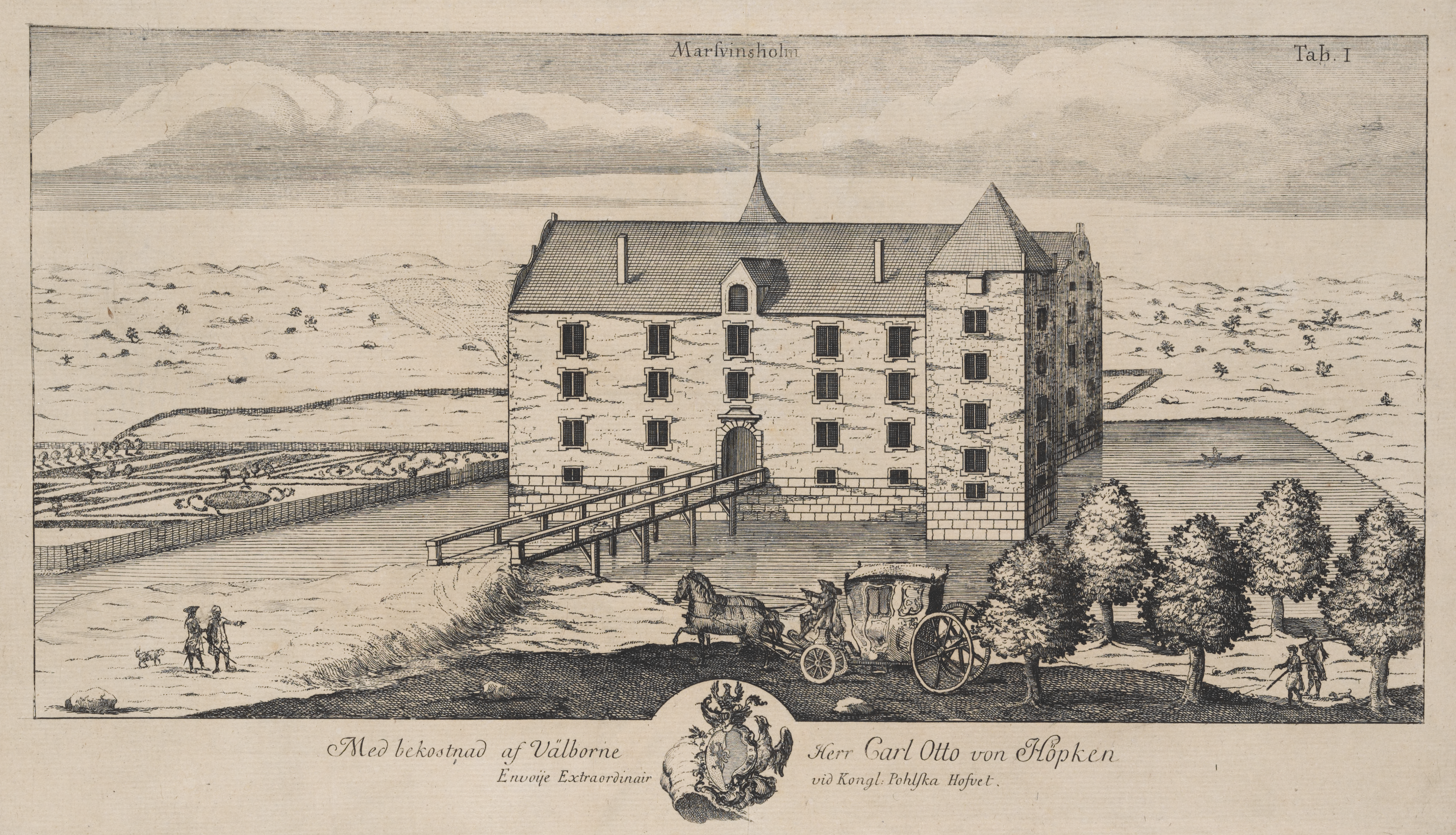
Marsvinsholm Castle built by a Danish nobleman between 1644–1648 and shown as at 1680. The grandeur of the building is emphasised by the moat and extensive formal Italianate gardens to the left of the image.

The period between 1536 and 1660 is often considered a golden age of the Scania nobility in terms of their wealth and economic control. Church estates were confiscated by the Crown in 1536 (following the example of the Swedish Crown in 1527 provided by Gustav Vasa). These included prosperous lands belonging to the former archbishopric at Hogestad and Snårestad as well as those of the monasteries at Bosjökloster, Dalbykloster and Övedskloster. However, the land swap policy of Fredrik II whereby he exchanged lands in Scania for lands near his own estate in Själland (Zealand) resulted in large areas within Scania falling into the hands of local nobility. Their wealth is visible in the private castle-building of the period in places such as Rosendal Castle. By the 17th century approximately 54% overall of the 15,000 estates in Scania were owned by the nobility, though the concentration of ownership was not evenly spread. In the area of Ystad, around 80% of the farmland was owned by aristocrats by 1650.

=== Regional tensions ===
Scania's geopolitical position, situated on the Scandinavian mainland but politically part of the Danish kingdom, made it for centuries the focal point of the struggle for hegemony in the Baltic region between Denmark and Sweden, the so-called dominium maris baltici. The two Nordic countries were in conflict with each other for about five hundred years. By possessing both sides of the Öresund strait, as well as The Belts, Denmark had effective control over the entrance to the Baltic Sea and was able to monopolize trade through the sounds. From the 15th century, Denmark started to collect the Sound Dues, a transitory due from all foreign ships passing through the strait, whether en route to or from Denmark or not. The Sound Dues constituted the major source of income for the Danish crown and was resented by the Swedish Crown. In the Second Treaty of Brömsebro (1645), Sweden's representatives stipulated toll freedom in Öresund for the country, and after this point, Sweden was exempted from paying the Danish Sound Toll. However, this arrangement came to an end in 1720, when the Treaty of Frederiksborg officially ended Sweden's toll-free status. Denmark continued to collect Sound Toll until 1857.

In the winter of 1612, over a period of two weeks, the Swedish King Gustav II Adolf burned down or otherwise destroyed 24 Scanian parishes and most of their population without meeting any enemy troops. The largest destroyed settlement was the town of Væ, which two years later was replaced by Danish King Christian IV as the nearby Christiansted (after the Swedification process, spelled Kristianstad), the last Scanian town to be founded by a Danish king.

== 1658 conquest by Sweden ==
Following the Treaty of Roskilde in 1658, Scania together with all Danish lands east of Öresund became a possession of Sweden. This treaty followed the Dano-Swedish War (1657-1658), which was a part of a wider war, which also included Poland and some of the German states of that time.

Soon after the signing of the Instrument of Cession king Charles X Gustav of Sweden landed in Helsingborg on 5 March 1658 (O.S.) to take possession of the newly acquired provinces. The king was received by a delegation led by the bishop of the Diocese of Lund, Peder Winstrup. The Copenhagen-born bishop quickly shifted his allegiance to the new ruler and later became ennobled. He stayed in office until his death in 1679.

After the Roskilde treaty war with Denmark soon broke out again, this time started by Charles X Gustav of Sweden. The result of this war and the following Treaty of Copenhagen (1660) was the return of Bornholm to Denmark and the present border between the countries was established. At that time king Charles Gustav had died of an infection, during a visit to Gothenburg.

Scania, together with the other so-called Scanian provinces, was placed under a Governor-General taking up residence in the city of Malmö. The first Governor-General was Gustaf Otto Stenbock. This type of government was used in territories which were not fully integrated and were regarded as being more exposed to enemy attacks. The Governor-General held the highest military command in his area and had four county governors answering to him. In 1669 the general governorate was dismantled, but after the outbreak of the Scanian War in 1676 it was reinstituted.

In 1666 the University of Lund or Regia Academia Carolina, after a proposal from Bishop Peder Winstrup, was established as part of a programme of measures to further integrate the newly acquired provinces. The university was closed during the Scanian War, but reopened in 1682.

In 1676, during the Scanian War, the province was occupied by Denmark and many Scanians either joined the Danish army or fought with the Danish. The members of this partisan movement were known as "friskydter", but are today most known by the Swedish degrading name Snapphanar. The 1676–1679 war between Denmark and Sweden over Scania was devastating for the people of Scania. It effectively ended in a draw, after much destruction of property and suffering for the civilian population. Landskrona Citadel became used as the primary Danish base and recruitment centre Turning points came with the Swedish victories in the Battle of Lund in December 1676 and the Battle of Landskrona in July 1677. But the war continued another two years.

In the Treaty of Fontainebleau (1679) on 2.September (Gregorian calendar) peace was restored through French intervention. The Treaty of Copenhagen (1660) borders would be restored in exchange for indemnities, and yet again would Scania become subordinated to Sweden against the will of its people. and the treaty was again confirmed as Treaty of Lund exactly a fortnight later, on the 16th.

1690 portrait of Charles XI with a lion—a symbol for military prowess, fidelity, royal dignity and power.

Section 9 of the Roskilde peace treaty had initially ensured autonomy in Scania and in an additional agreement, signed at the Malmö Recess in 1662, Sweden guaranteed that the old laws and privileges of Scania would continue to apply in the region. The Malmö Recess agreement further ensured that Scanian noblemen, priests and peasants would be allowed to send representatives to the Swedish parliament.

However, in 1680 Sweden's first era of absolute monarchy was ushered in as the Swedish king Charles XI managed to convince the Diet, (the Riksdag of the Estates, an early form of Swedish Parliament) to declare the king "a Christian ruler with absolute power to rule his kingdom at his discretion". In 1682, the Diet downgraded the Council of State to a King's Council and gave the king unlimited powers to legislate without the need for confirmation from the Diet. A decision not to honour the agreement of the Malmö Recess soon followed and a tougher Swedification program was implemented in Scania, aiming to create uniformity within the Swedish kingdom. Scania was allowed to retain its old laws and customs until 1683, at which point the Swedish administration persuaded the Scanian aristocracy to waive the Scanian laws and privileges in favour of the new Swedish law and church ordinance, as a condition for allowing Scanians to have representation in the Swedish parliament.

An entire staff of Swedish politicians, artists, poets and scholars were engaged in creating an image of the king as an instrument of God and a personification of the apocalyptic "Lion of the North", a form of symbolic imagery first introduced for Gustav II Adolf. The propaganda was not only aimed at convincing the Swedish population of the king's divinely ordained power, but was also part of a campaign to present Sweden to the world as an imperial power of considerable wealth and military glory. Many works of art from the era show Charles XI as a victorious warrior in Scania and on the central panel of Jacques Foucquet's monumental ceiling painting in the Stockholm Royal Palace, Charles XI is depicted with "the goddess of Scania" at his feet.

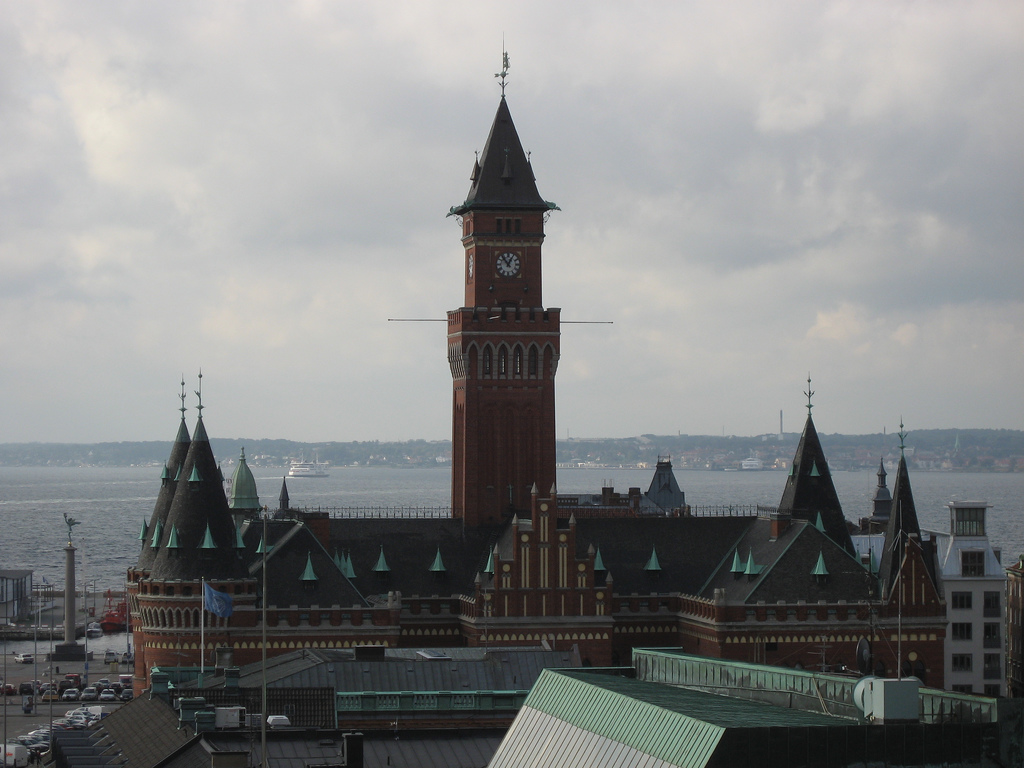
Helsingborg City Hall, with Öresund strait and the Danish shoreline in the background

Blekinge and especially Halland were successively removed from the Skåneland dominion and became fully integrated into the Swedish Kingdom, while the four counties of Scania were joined into one county. Blekinge was though allowed to remain within the diocese of Lund and still is. A gradual process of incorporation of Scania into the Swedish Kingdom was successfully concluded by 1720.

The latest battle between Denmark and Sweden concerning the control of Scania was the Battle of Helsingborg (1710) during the Great Northern War. In March that year the last Danish troops left the province. In July 1720, a peace treaty between Sweden and Denmark again confirmed the status of Scania as part of Sweden.

Two counties got governors and an administrative pattern identical to the other Swedish counties. However, the hostilities between Denmark and Sweden during the Napoleonic Wars caused Sweden to reintroduce the office of the Governor-General. Between 1801 and 1809, Johan Christopher Toll was appointed Governor-General of Scania, with the county governors of Kristianstad County and Malmöhus County answering to him.

King Charles XII took up residence in the city of Lund for two years after his return to Sweden from the Ottoman Empire in 1716.

In July 1720, a peace treaty between Sweden and Denmark again confirmed the status of Scania as part of Sweden.

== Modern history ==
A land reform, the so-called Enskiftet was implemented at the turn of century 1700/1800. At that time the population of the province had just passed 250,000 inhabitants. Rutger Macklean was the first to enforce this largely good reform in the 1780s, at his feudal domains around Svaneholm Castle. But he also burned down the farmer's villages which later caused some unnecessary troubles when the reform was enforced generally.

Jean-Baptiste Bernadotte, the future king Charles XIV John, landed in Helsingborg on the 20 of October 1810 on his way from Paris to Stockholm.

In 1811 revolts broke out in different parts of Sweden due to extra conscriptions of farmers. At the Klågerup shootings 30–40 civilians got shot to death by the military. Several hundred were taken prisoners or/and were wounded. In the aftermath two men publicly first got their right hand cut off and then were beheaded at Stortorget square in Malmö. Also many others were physically punished.

The first horse-drawn railway (although with wooden rails) on Swedish soil was opened in 1798 at Höganäs, connecting the coal mine with the harbour. In 1856 one of the first public railways in the country opened between Malmö and Lund.

In 1863 the population of Scania had reached 500,000 inhabitants.

In the 19th century Scania became the cradle of the Swedish Social Democratic Party when August Palm held his speech "Hvad vilja socialisterna?" ("What do the Socialists want?") in Malmö in 1881, where he also started the newspaper Folkviljan.

Train ferries began to sail the HH route between Helsingborg and Elsinore in 1892 and from 1909 on the route Trelleborg – Sassnitz, Germany. The train ferries later began to transport cars and lorries as well.

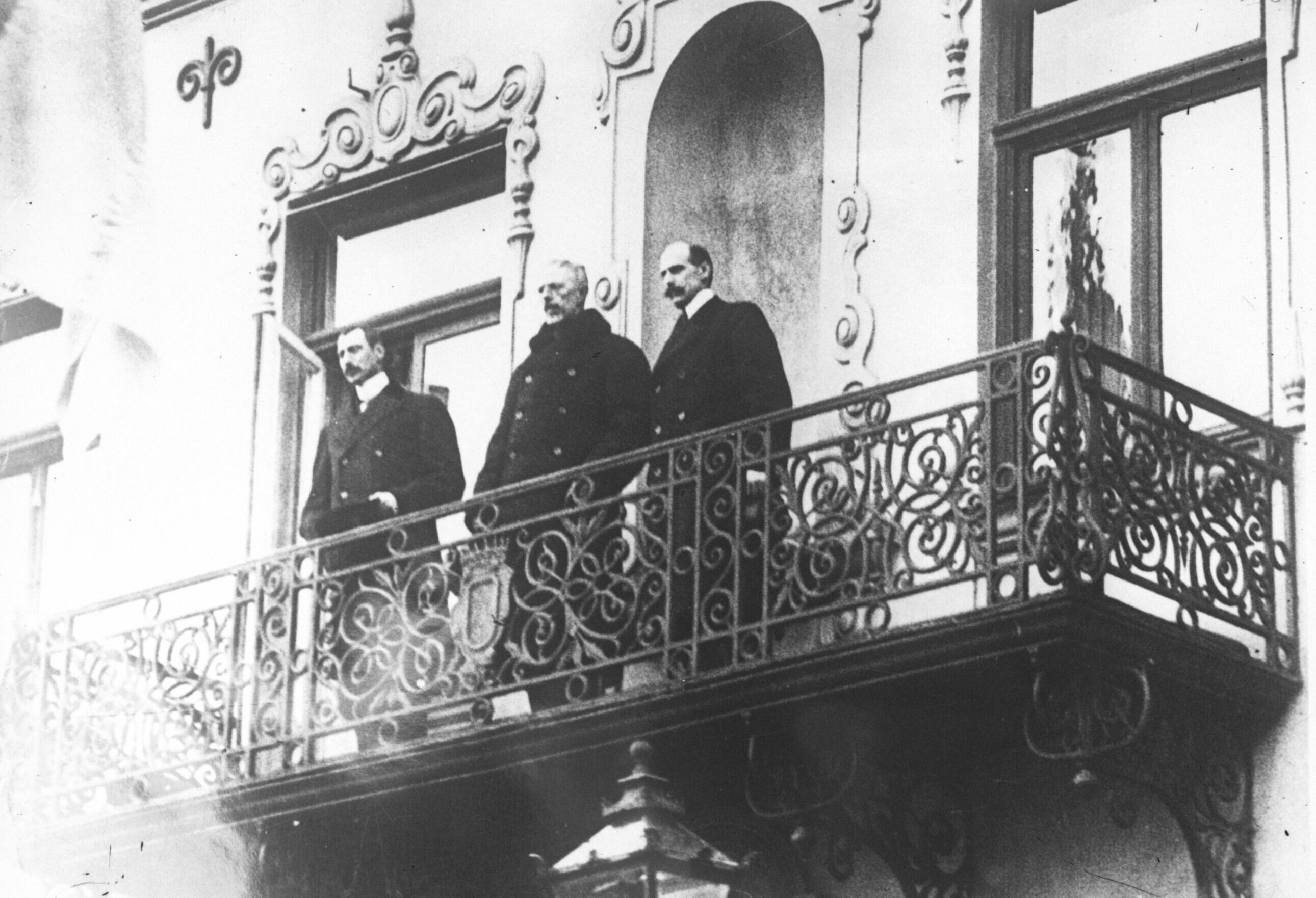
All three Scandinavina kings together in Malmö 18 December 1914

At 18. and 19. December 1914, the Three Kings Meeting was held in Malmö. In order to confirm the joint Scandinavian neutrality during the then ongoing World War, the Swedish King Gustav V, the Danish King Christian X and (his brother) the Norwegian King Håkon VII met together with their Ministers of Foreign Affairs, at Malmö. The Three King's meeting also meant the full Swedish acceptance of Norway's secession from the former Swedish-Norwegian union in 1905. The Swedish King as of 1905, Oscar II couldn't accept his loss of Norway. But in 1907 had his son Gustav V become King, and at least by 1914 could the new Swedish Regent see the call for a normalisation also between the Swedish and the new Norwegian courts. Ever since this Royal meeting in Malmö, has the Royal relationships between Sweden, Denmark and Norway indeed been excellent.

The first public flight school in Sweden was set up in 1915, at Ljungbyhed by Enoch Thulin. Between 1926 and 1996 it was the flight school of the Swedish Air Force. Today commercial flight training is performed at Ljungbyhed Airport, one of the world's oldest active airports. In 1924 the world's shortest international air route was opened from Malmö Bulltofta Airport to Copenhagen, Denmark, using Junkers F 13.

After the February Revolution in Russia 1917, Germany's hope for a separate peace treaty with Russia arose. But the new Russian "temporary leader" Alexander Kerensky declined. Then Germany gave the Russian communist agitator Vladimir Lenin and his companions in Switzerland a safe-conduct through the German Empire, in the hope that Lenin and the communists would destabilise Russia so that hopefully peace could be achieved at the Eastern Front. In August 1917 Lenin and his entourage arrived to Scania, on this historically important journey, through the train ferry line between Saßnitz (Germany) and Trelleborg (Scania in Sweden).

Between 1930 and 1939, the Saxtorp TT-races were held. Motorcycle races resembling the ones at Isle of Man. Nine of these in all ten races, gathered attendances exceeding 100.000, up to 160.000. No other sport events in Sweden has seen crowds of this size. The 1937 race "only" attracted 80.000 people due to heavy rain.

The first motorway in Sweden was inaugurated in 1953 connecting Malmö and Lund (today part of European route E22).

For the 1958 FIFA World Cup was Malmö Stadion build, it was a venue for both football and track and field. The opening game of the entire championships was played there as BRD or "West Germany" defeated Argentina, 3–1. A few games were also played at Olympia in Helsingborg.

In the middle of the 1970s the population of the province passed the one-million mark.

The first aircraft hijacking in Sweden occurred in September 1972 at Bulltofta Airport in Malmö, involving Croatian terrorists.

Malmö and the old Malmö Stadion was one of the four stadiums which hosted the UEFA Euro 1992. Three games were played at Malmö Stadion, Denmark vs England 0-0, England vs France 0–0 and France vs Denmark 1–2.

A new administrative pattern was set up 1997 when Kristianstad County and Malmöhus County were amalgamated, forming Skåne County with 33 municipalities.

In July 2000 the Öresund Bridge was inaugurated, creating a fixed rail and road link between Sweden and Denmark.

At 6.22 am CET, on 16 December 2008 did a very unusual earthquake hit not only Scania, but was felt in large parts of Götaland, Denmark and Northern Germany and Poland. Its epicentre was located close to Sjöbo, and measured 4.8–4.9 on the Richter Scale, and was the worst earthquake in Sweden for a century or longer, according to the closest seismographic station, which is located in Berlin, Germany The craw-flight distance between Sjöbo and Berlin is less than 400 km.

Pope Francis visited the province on 31 October and 1 November 2016. His 24-hour Scanian visit commemorated the 500 year anniversary of the beginning of The Reformation. An ecumenical liturgy was held in the 900 year old Lund Cathedral and the following morning the pope conducted a Catholic mass at Malmö FF's football stadium. During the ecumenical commemoration in the cathedral the Pope and the president of the Lutheran World Federation, Bishop Dr Munib Younan signed a treaty in which Lutherans and Catholics promised each other to in the future see more to what unites than differs between these two branches of Christianity (The Pope had earlier done the same with the Eastern Orthodox Church).

During 2015, the province's population exceeded 1.3 million.
