= Great Partition =

The Great Partition (Swedish: storskiftet Finnish: isojako) was an agricultural land reform in the Swedish Empire. It was a reform supported by the government with the purpose of shifting the land of the village communities, from the solskifte, where every farmer owned several pieces of land split about the village, to a new system, where every farmer owned a connected piece of farmland. The purpose was to increase profit. This was the greatest land reform in Swedish history.

The shift began in 1749 by the initiative of Jacob Faggot, and in 1757 a regulation was issued to given the reform a set organization. Initially, the request to start a reform of a peasant community demanded consensus, but in the regulation of 1757, a village could be shifted upon the request of only one farmer.

The reform greatly changed the rural life. According to the old rules, solskifte, the farmers of a village all had equal share in the land owned by the village collectively, and the land belonging to their farm were split around the area. This made the land belonging to each farm hard to access and work, as it was spread with long distances, but it also secured a greater social justice, as everyone had both bad and good land in their possession.

The result of the reform was that each farm possessed fewer but larger land parcels. This made the land easier to use, but also lessened the standard of living for those being allotted bad land.

The reform was slow, however, and new reform laws were introduced: the radical enskiftet of 1803–07 by initiative of Rutger Macklean signified the partition of the traditional villages in to separate farms, while the laga skiftet of 1827 was a more mild reform with better consideration for local necessities.
