= Rutger Macklean =

Swedish jurist, military officer, politician and land owner

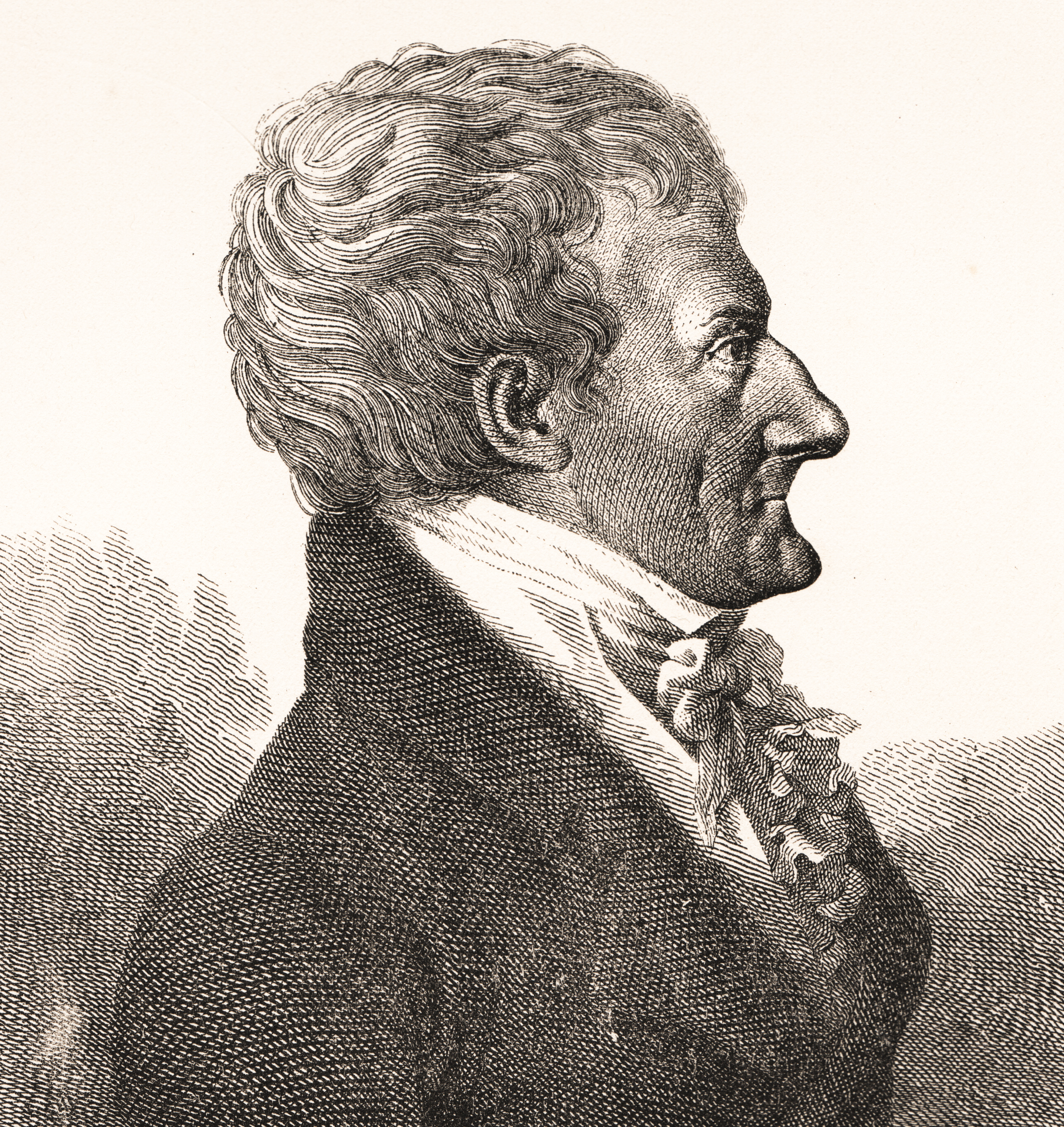
- Born: 28 July 1742; Ström Manor, Hjärtum parish, Bohuslän, Sweden
- Died: 14 January 1816 (aged 73); Svaneholm Castle, Skurup parish, Sweden
- Title: Friherre
- Parent: Rutger Macklean
- Relatives: David Makeléer, grandfather

Rutger Macklean (28 July 1742 – 14 January 1816) also Rutger Macklier II was a Swedish jurist, military officer, politician and land owner. He was a driving figure in the introduction of Swedish agricultural land reforms (Enskiftet) which made possible large-scale farming with its economy of scale.

== Biography ==
Macklean was born on 28 July 1742 at Ström Manor, Hjärtum parish, Bohuslän to Baron Rutger Macklier (1688–1748) and Vilhelmina Eleonora Coyet (1719–1778). He became a student at Lund University in 1757 and graduated with a law degree in 1759. After completing his law degree, he served at the High Court in Jönköping. He became a sergeant in the Holstein regiment in 1763, in 1770 quartermaster and a cornet, and in 1771 a lieutenant in the Jämtland cavalry company and in 1776 the captain of the Kalmar regiment and a commander in the Uppvidinge company. In 1782, Macklean was an army Captain in the forces of the Swedish Army. His brother, Baron Gustaf Macklean (1744–1804) was also a senior military officer.

In 1782, he inherited Svaneholm Castle and its estate of 8500 acres from his mother’s family. In accordance with feudal procedures of tenant land-right inheritance the manor had been divided, in the course of its existence, into hundreds of narrow strip allotments. Some 40 tenant farmers live in four villages on the manor. Each tenant had the right to farm 60 to 70 strips of land, but only two thirds of a tenant's strips were usually close enough to his village that he had time to farm them; his farther strips went unused. Agriculture on the approximately 7,000 acres was poorly managed, productivity was very low and the subordinate farmers mostly indebted.

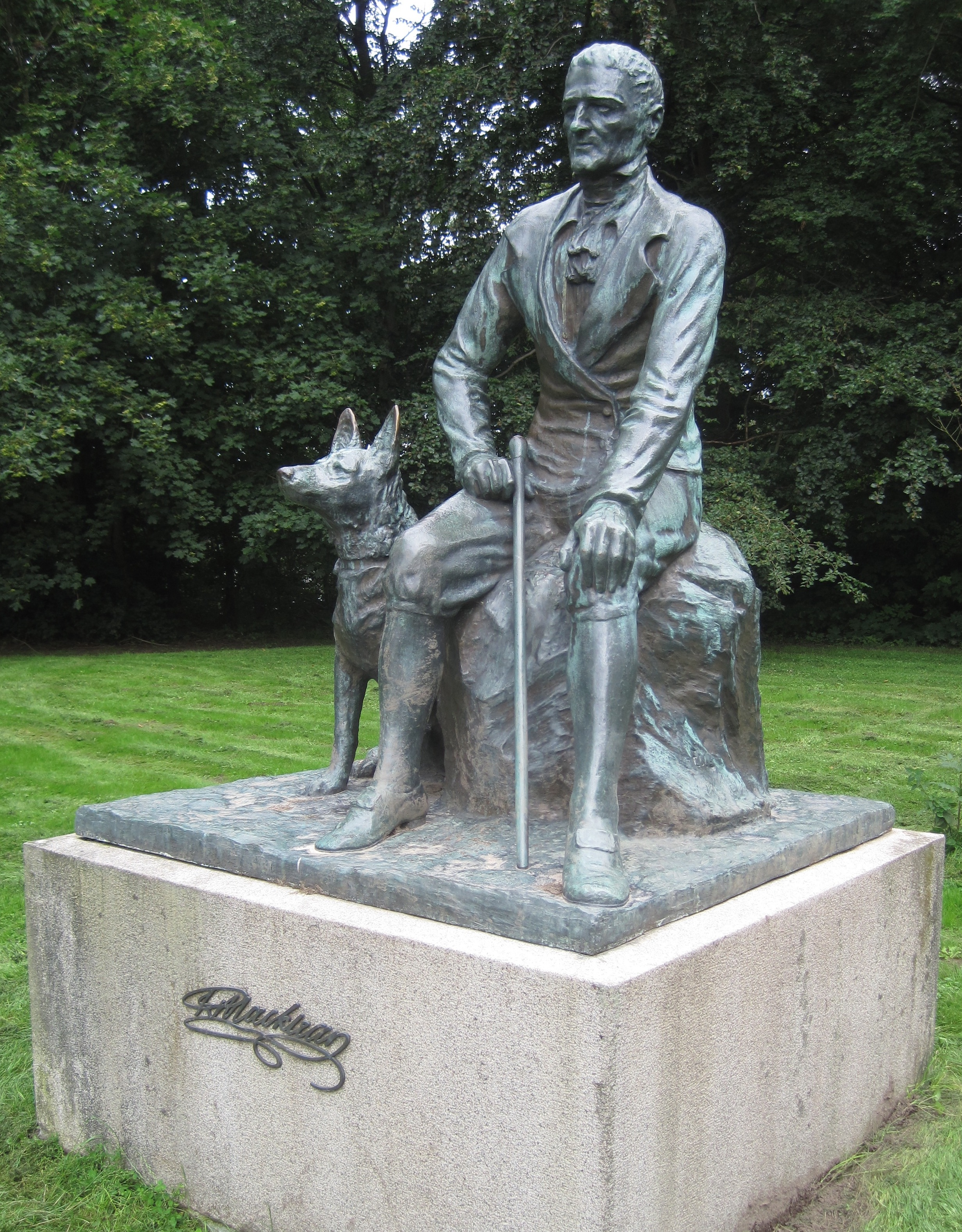
Rutger Macklean statue at Svaneholm Castle

Macklean had his land surveyed and divided into 75 farms. A new cottage and barn were built on each farm and roads were built to connect each farm. A tenant farmer moved into the new farmhouse and they found they could raise more crops on half as much land. He introduced new agricultural implements and taught the farmers to grow crops with higher yields. Despite strong resistance from the tenant farmers and considerable financial difficulties, he basically implemented his plans in a few years. Macklean's land redistribution procedures were introduced into law in Scania in 1802, and land reform legislation (Laga skiftet) for all of Sweden followed in 1827.

In 1812, Macklean was elected to the Royal Swedish Academy of Sciences and became an honorary member of the Royal Swedish Academy of Agriculture and Forestry. He died at Svaneholm Castle in 1816. He is buried in Skurup Church.

== Family surname and origin ==
The family surname was originally spelled "Mackleir". In 1783, one year after Rutger Mackleir inherited Svaneholm Castle in Skåne from his uncle Gustaf Julius Coyet (1717–1782), the name was changed to "Mackeleir" and so remained until Mackeleir and his brother were ennobled, when it became "Macklier" again. During the Anglo-Saxon pre-romantic era it was changed again, to "Macklean". Sources conflict as to whether the Mackleirs were descended from Hector Og Maclean of Scotland or were from Holland.

== Ancestors ==
Baron Rutger Macklean's ancestors in three generations
Baron Rutger Macklean,	Father: Baron Rutger Macklier	Paternal Grandfather: David Makeléer	Paternal Great-Grandfather: Sir John Maclean, 1st Baronet
Baron Rutger Macklean,	Father: Baron Rutger Macklier	Paternal Grandfather: David Makeléer	Paternal Great-grandmother: Anna Gubbertz
Baron Rutger Macklean,	Father: Baron Rutger Macklier	Paternal Grandmother: Eleonora Elisabet von Ascheberg	Paternal Great-Grandfather: Rutger von Ascheberg
Baron Rutger Macklean,	Father: Baron Rutger Macklier	Paternal Grandmother: Eleonora Elisabet von Ascheberg	Paternal Great-Grandmother:
Baron Rutger Macklean,	Mother: Vilhelmina Eleonora Coyet	Maternal Grandfather: possibly Gustaf Adolf Coyet I	Maternal Great-Grandfather:
Baron Rutger Macklean,	Mother: Vilhelmina Eleonora Coyet	Maternal Grandfather: possibly Gustaf Adolf Coyet I	Maternal Great-Grandmother:
Baron Rutger Macklean,	Mother: Vilhelmina Eleonora Coyet	Maternal Grandmother: possibly Bernhardine Morass	Maternal Great-grandfather:
Baron Rutger Macklean,	Mother: Vilhelmina Eleonora Coyet	Maternal Grandmother: possibly Bernhardine Morass	Maternal Great-Grandmother:

== See also ==
- Solskifte

== Related reading ==
- Sölve Göransson (1961) Regular Open-Field Pattern in England and Scandinavian Solskifte (Geografiska Annaler. Volume 43 – Issue 1-2)
