= Skurup Church =

- Skurups kyrka
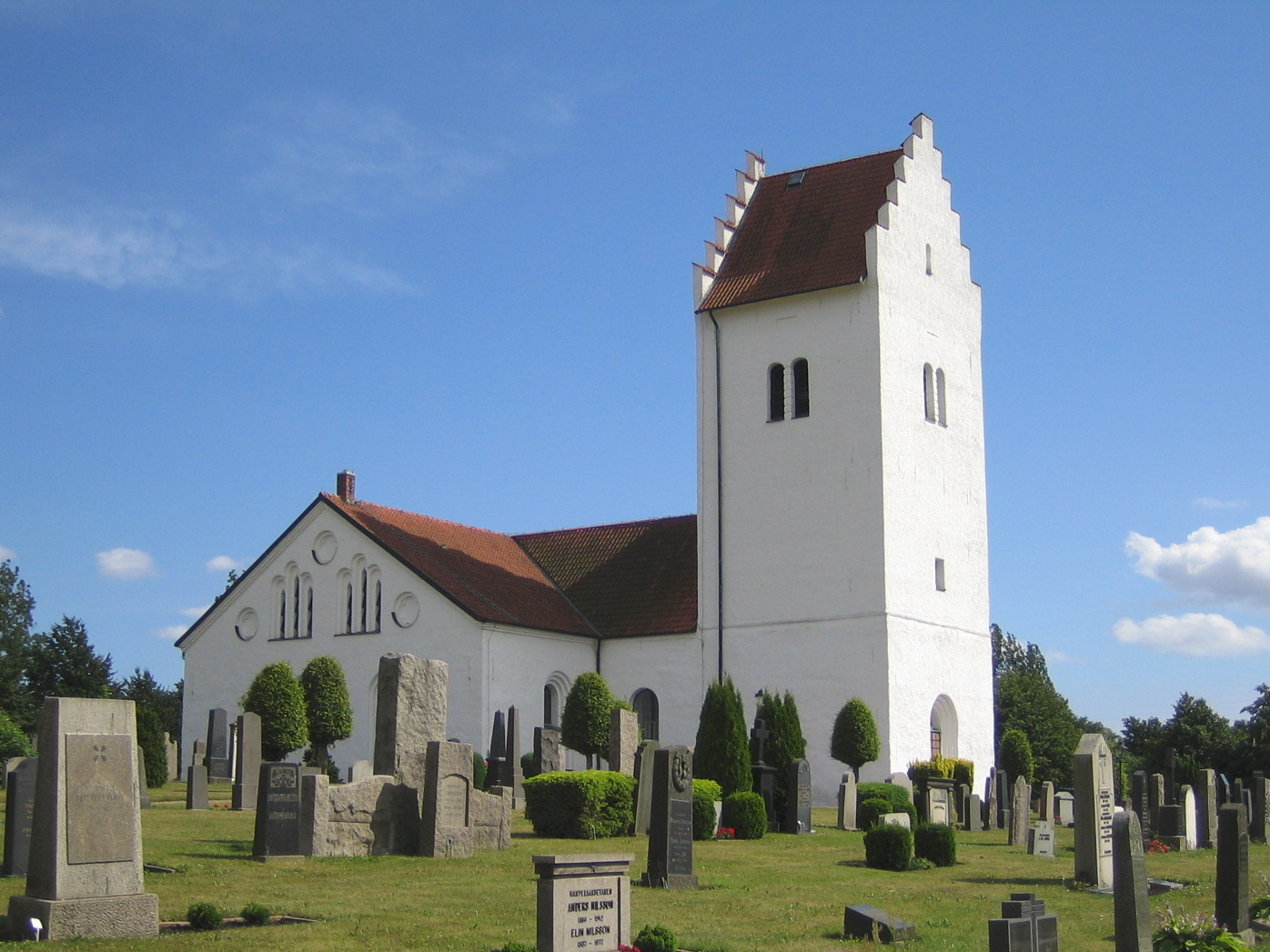
- Skurup Church

- 55°28′21″N 13°30′34″E
- Country: Sweden
- Denomination: Church of Sweden

Skurup Church (Swedish: Skurups kyrka) is a church in Skurup, Scania, Sweden.

== History and architecture ==
The oldest parts of Skurup Church are the chancel, the apse and parts of the tower, built during the 12th century. A new tower was built in the 14th century, and during the same century the vaults of the chancel were constructed. In 1543 the church was enlarged towards the west, and in 1590 the church was expanded through the addition of a burial chapel for the owners of nearby Svaneholm Castle. The tower was rebuilt again in 1595. In 1817 the church porch on the south side of the church was demolished. With the arrival of the railway to Skurup in the middle of the 19th century, the population grew and the church was subsequently enlarged. Two transepts were built between 1856 and 1858, designed by Carl Georg Brunius. At the same time, large parts of the nave were rebuilt. The church was renovated between 1950 and 1951, when medieval murals were also discovered under layers of whitewash and restored.

The murals in the chancel date from the 1340s and depict scenes from the childhood of Christ. In the apse there are additional murals depicting Christ in Majesty and the twelve apostles and other saints. The baptismal font of the church dates from the 13th century. Both of the church bells are from 1595 and made in Copenhagen. The pulpit is from 1605 and decorated with reliefs and sculptures depicting the evangelists and Moses.

The burial chapel built for the owners of Svaneholm Castle contains the grave of politician and land reformer Rutger Macklean.
