= Ninni Kronberg =

Swedish inventor

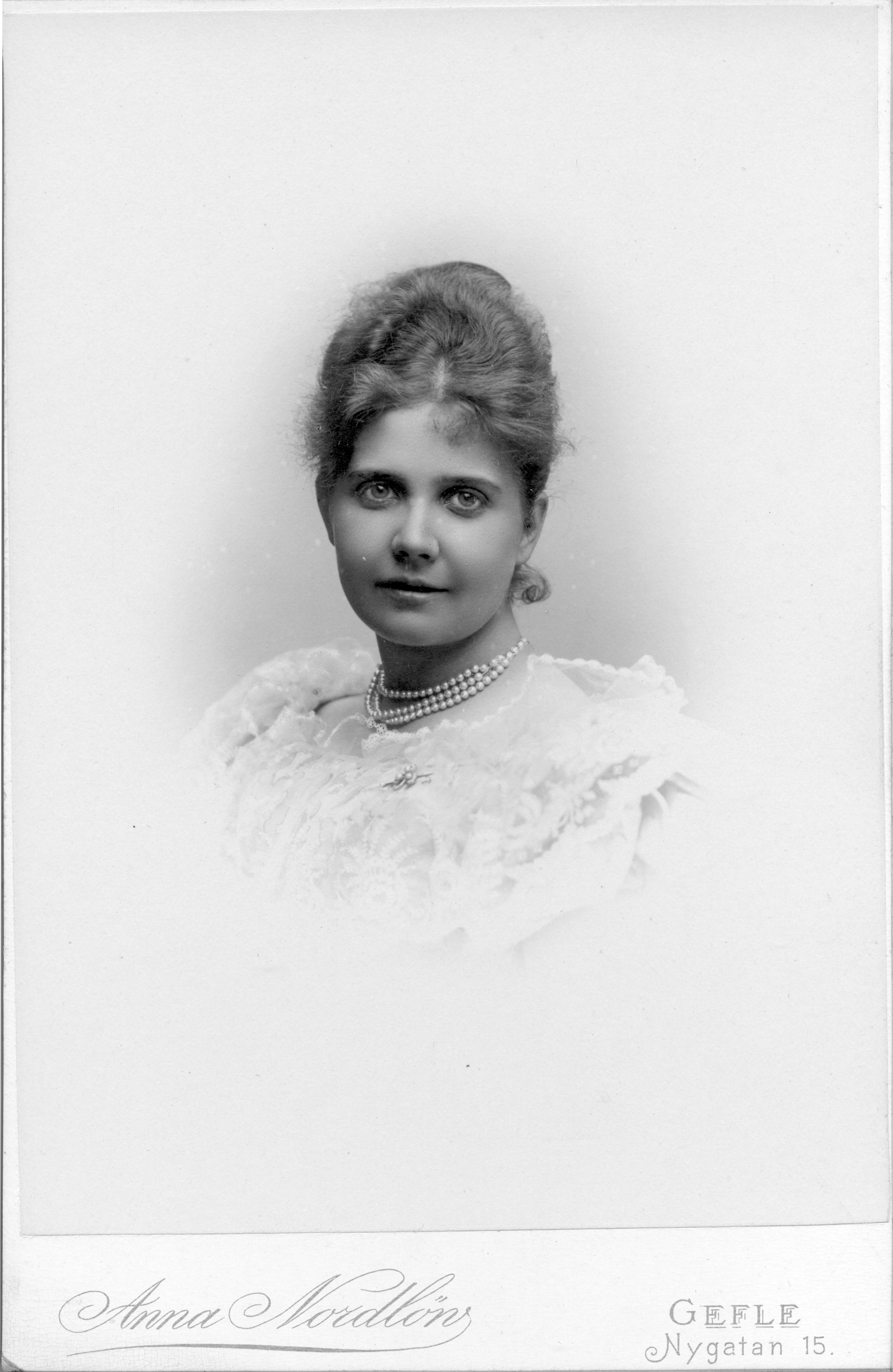
Ninni Kronberg

Maria Johanna "Ninni" Kronberg (1874–1946) was a Swedish inventor. In 1933, Kronberg invented the patent for powdered milk, which ultimately led to the founding of the Semper AB company, a food product manufacturing company.

== Early life ==
Kronberg was born in Gävle in 1874 as the daughter of Viktor Berggren and Caroline Louise Stuart. Educated by governesses throughout her youth, Kronberg never received high school qualifications. In 1896 at the age of 22, Kronberg married wholesaler Erik Kronberg. The couple were well-off in Gävle and ran a large household. Kronberg took pleasure in many things such as handicrafts, painting, sailing and travelling.

Erik Kronberg took over his father's business, B. G. Kronbergs Spannmålsaffär & Maltfabrik, after his death in 1901. In 1915, this became a limited company called AB Kronbergs Maltfabrik. Ninni Kronberg actively supported her husband with the business. In 1922, the business went bankrupt. The Kronsbergs experienced tension in their childless matrimony, and finally divorced in 1925. During this time, Ninni Kronberg moved in with a friend named Gudrun Juel-Westrup and her husband, the diplomat Wilhelm Westrup, at the Rydsgård estate in Skåne.

== Career and Inventions (powdered milk) ==
At the Rydsgård estate, Kronberg was able to create a Practic yeast agent. Kronberg created this yeast product with her knowledge from her time working at her ex-husbands company. Following the invention, Kronberg founded a company together with the Westrups called AB Practic Comp Ltd which launched her product. After further research, Kronberg was awarded her first patent in 1927. She then developed a milk serum, a big step towards her invention for long-lasting powered milk.

After working for several years, in 1934, Kronberg submitted a patent for a newer and better method for the production of a longer-lasting powdered milk. In 1937, Kronberg was awarded 25,000 SEK (Swedish krona) by the Swedish Ministry of Agriculture for her invention. Axel Wenner-Gren, the founder of Electrolux, a Swedish home appliance manufacturer, realised the potential of Kronberg's powdered milk. In 1938, Wenner-Gren created Svenska Mjölkprodukter AB (SMP) to produce Kronberg's powdered milk. SMP built a production plant in Kimstad and production began on 1 September 1939. Although production began during the outbreak of World War II, putting a stop to all exports, the factory produced powdered milk for Sweden's emergency food supply allowing the company to get off on a good start. During the 1940s Ninni Kronberg face multiple legal disputes. Kronberg sued the C. Bert Lilja & Co private bank and the estate owner Erik von Geijer for attempting to illegally acquire her contract with Svenska Mjölkprodukter AB. The court ultimately sided with Kronberg.

== Death and legacy ==
Ninni Kronberg died on 1 October 1949 at the age of 75. In 1963, SMP changed their name to Semper and now focuses on the production of powdered milk and baby food. Semper stated that Kronberg's innovation formed the foundation of the company.

== General references ==
- M Johanna (Ninni) Kronberg, Sveriges biografiska lexikon
