= Ström House =

Manor House in Sweden

Coordinates: 58°8′16″N 12°6′50″E

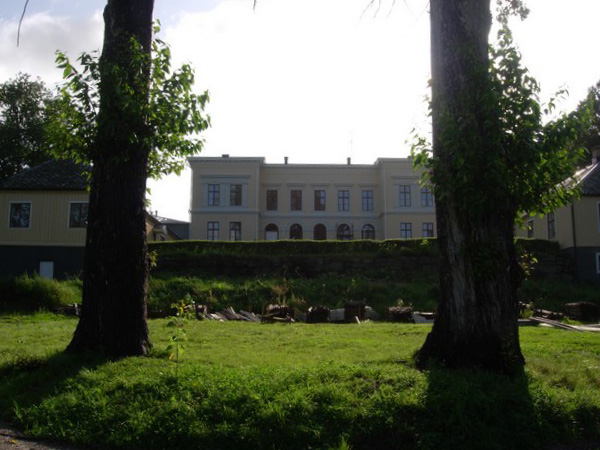
- Interactive map of the Ström House area

General information
- Location: Bohuslän, Sweden

Ström House (Swedish: Ströms slott) is a manor house at Lilla Edet Municipality in Bohuslän, Sweden. It is located west of the Göta River, in the parish of Hjärtum.

== History ==
Between 1685 and 1691, a manor house with built two wings and a slate roof. In the 1840s, the property was sold to Asmus Heinrich Evers (1793–1877), a wholesaler who had immigrated from Lübeck, Germany. The manor house was demolished or burned down in 1851. The current main building was built in 1852 according to drawings by architect Edvard Medén (1825–1911).

In the 1980s, the manor was converted into a conference and restaurant facility. After a bankruptcy in 1990, the manor house underwent renovation. In 2007, it reopened for use as a preschool and daycare center, Ströms slott förskola.

== Exterbak links ==
- Ströms slott website
