= Lilla Edet =

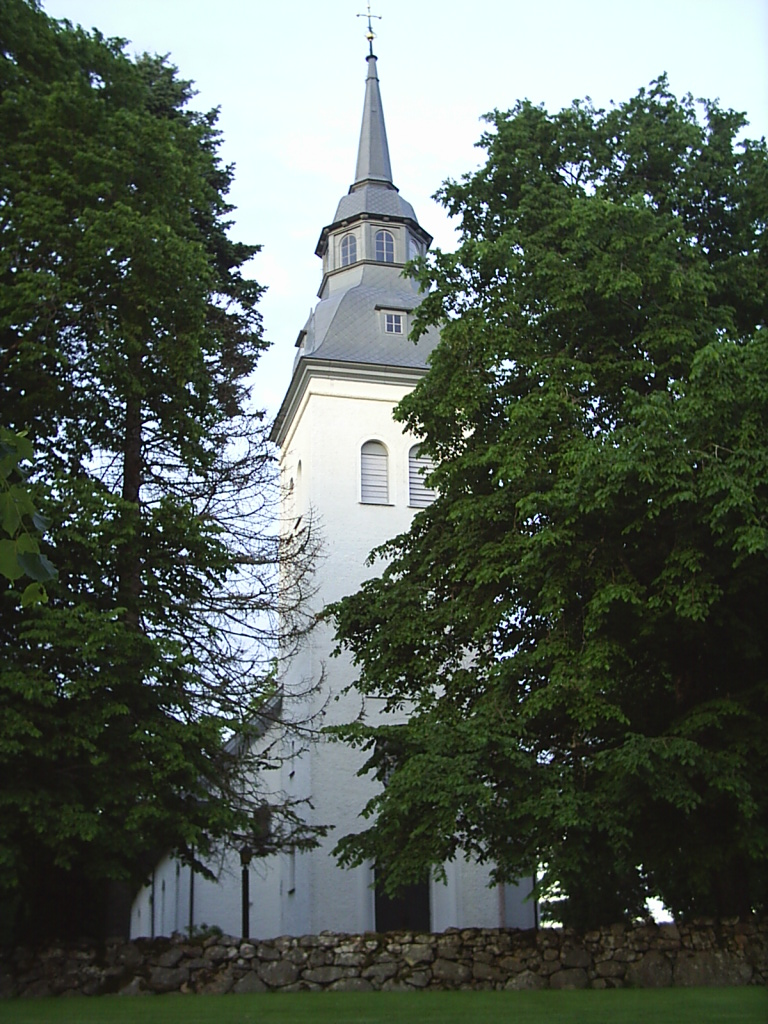
- Hjärtum Church

- Location within Västra Götaland Location within Sweden
- Coordinates: 58°08′N 12°08′E
- Country: Sweden
- Province: Västergötland and Bohuslän
- County: Västra Götaland County
- Municipality: Lilla Edet Municipality

Area
  - Total: 4.26 km^{2} (1.64 sq mi)

Population (31 December 2010)
  - Total: 4,862
  - Density: 1,142/km^{2} (2,960/sq mi)
- Time zone: UTC+1 (CET)
  - Summer (DST): UTC+2 (CEST)

Lilla Edet is a locality and the seat of Lilla Edet Municipality in Västra Götaland County, Sweden. It had 4,862 inhabitants in 2010.

Lilla Edet was the smallest of three settlements that were burnt down in Sweden on 25 June 1888. The wooden towns of Sundsvall and Umeå were almost completely destroyed. The triple fire was widely reported and one collection in California raised $5,000 and blankets and tents were sent from New Zealand.

The town Lilla Edet is situated on the eastern side of the Göta älv, a main river on the west coast of Sweden. It became known as a halt there. The area was known locally as Lilla Edet in comparison to Stora Edet, situated north of Lilla Edet and today known as Trollhättan. However, for a long time the official name of Lilla Edet was Bergaström.

== Lock system ==
A canal lock system was built at Lilla Edet as early as 1607, becoming the first of its kind in Sweden.
