= Skurup Municipality =

Skurup Municipality Skurups kommun
- Municipality
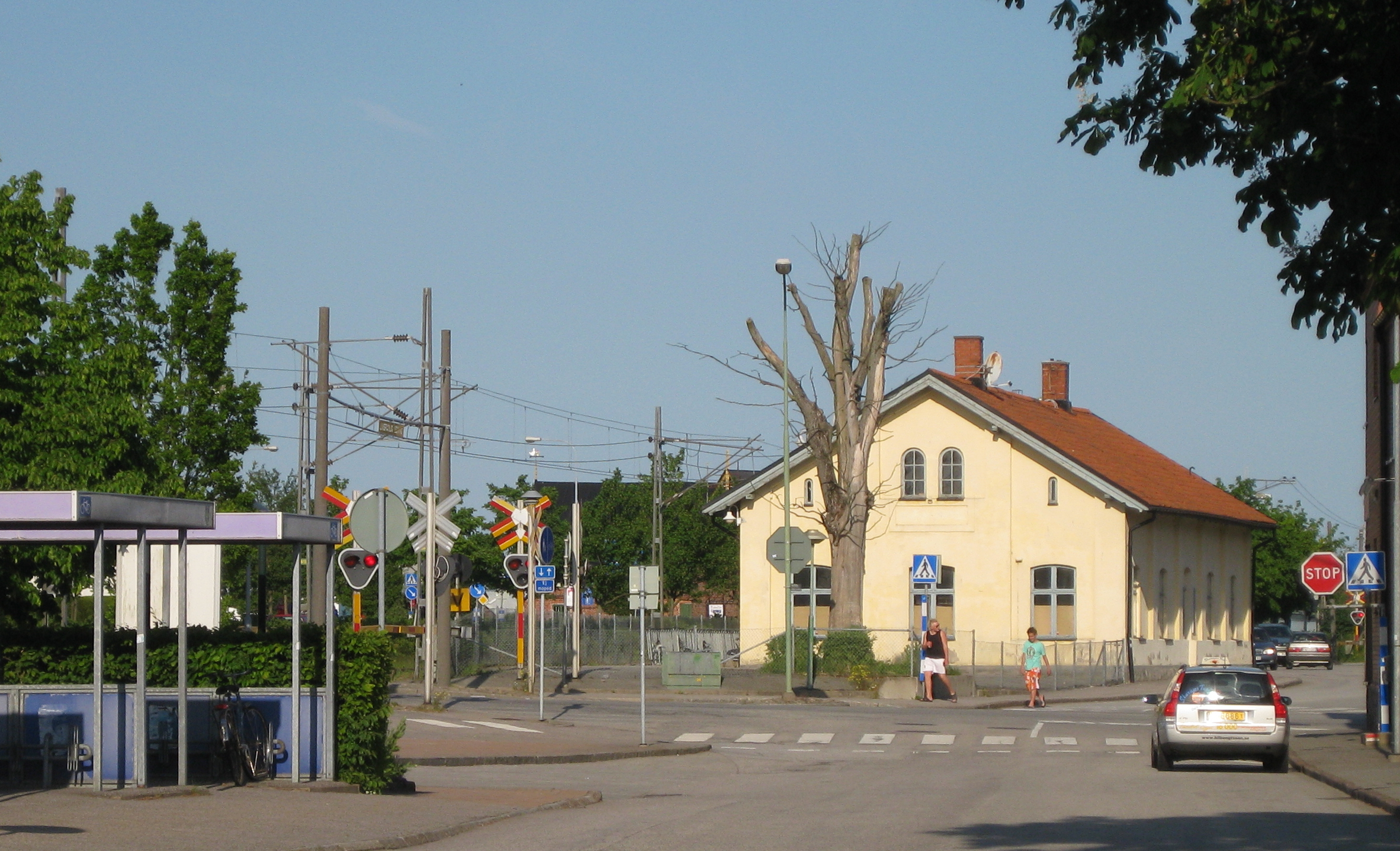
- Skurup Railway Station

- Flag Coat of arms

- Coordinates: 55°29′N 13°30′E
- Country: Sweden
- County: Skåne County
- Seat: Skurup

Area
  - Total: 510.96 km^{2} (197.28 sq mi)
  - Land: 193.58 km^{2} (74.74 sq mi)
  - Water: 317.38 km^{2} (122.54 sq mi)
- Area as of 1 January 2014.

Population (30 June 2025)
  - Total: 17,101
  - Density: 88.341/km^{2} (228.80/sq mi)
- Time zone: UTC+1 (CET)
  - Summer (DST): UTC+2 (CEST)
- ISO 3166 code: SE
- Province: Scania
- Municipal code: 1264
- Website: www.skurup.se

Skurup Municipality (Swedish: Skurups kommun) is a municipality in Skåne County in southern Sweden. Its seat is located in the town Skurup. It is considered part of Greater Malmö by Statistics Sweden.

The present municipality was formed in 1971 when the market town (köping) of Skurup was merged with Rydsgård and Vemmenhög.

== Localities ==
There are 4 urban areas (also called a Tätort or locality) in Skurup Municipality. In the table they are listed according to the size of the population as of December 31, 2005. The municipal seat is in bold characters.

#	Locality	Population
1	**Skurup**	6,978
2	Rydsgård	1,301
3	Skivarp	1,252
4	Abbekås	708

== Demographics ==
This is a demographic table based on Skurup Municipality's electoral districts in the 2022 Swedish general election sourced from SVT's election platform, in turn taken from SCB official statistics.

In total there were 16,403 residents, including 12,295 Swedish citizens of voting age. 35.3% voted for the left coalition and 63.4% for the right coalition. Indicators are in percentage points except population totals and income.

Location	Residents	Citizen adults	Left vote	Right vote	Employed	Swedish parents	Foreign heritage	Income SEK	Degree
Location			%	%					
Rydsgård	1,895	1,436	34.7	64.2	80	85	15	25,579	30
Skivarp N	2,073	1,476	34.6	64.3	81	82	18	25,951	32
Skivarp S	1,643	1,312	32.0	66.3	78	86	14	26,995	46
Skurup NO	2,037	1,537	36.1	62.0	76	78	22	24,151	25
Skurup NV	2,415	1,774	38.6	60.3	81	79	21	25,191	31
Skurup SO	2,531	1,923	33.4	65.4	76	84	16	22,265	32
Skurup SV	2,091	1,510	35.6	63.9	84	82	18	27,297	36
Slimminge	1,718	1,327	35.0	63.7	84	86	14	28,656	40
Source: SVT

== Places of interest ==
- Svaneholm Castle

== Twin cities ==
- Maszlow, Poland
- Franzburg-Richtenberg, Germany
