= Göta, Sweden =

Göta
- Location within Västra Götaland Location within Sweden
- Coordinates: 58°07′N 12°09′E
- Country: Sweden
- Province: Västergötland
- County: Västra Götaland County
- Municipality: Lilla Edet Municipality

Area
  - Total: 1.02 km^{2} (0.39 sq mi)

Population (31 December 2010)
  - Total: 920
  - Density: 906/km^{2} (2,350/sq mi)
- Time zone: UTC+1 (CET)
  - Summer (DST): UTC+2 (CEST)

Göta is a locality situated in Lilla Edet Municipality, Västra Götaland County, Sweden. It had 920 inhabitants in 2010.
