= Abbekås =

Locality in Sweden

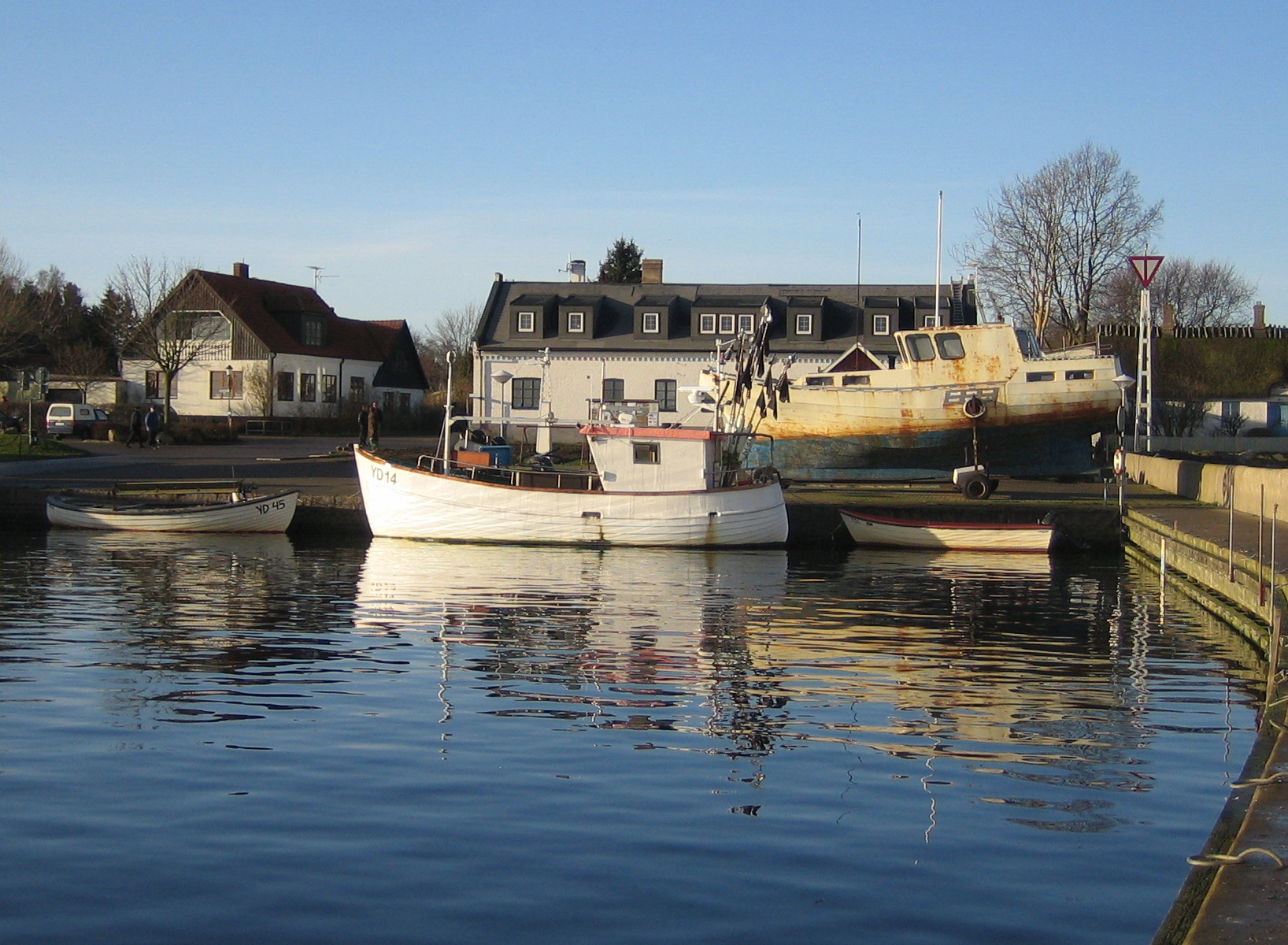

- Location within Skåne Location within Sweden
- Coordinates: 55°24′N 13°36′E
- Country: Sweden
- Province: Skåne
- County: Skåne County
- Municipality: Skurup Municipality

Area
  - Total: 0.91 km^{2} (0.35 sq mi)

Population (31 December 2010)
  - Total: 729
  - Density: 805/km^{2} (2,080/sq mi)
- Time zone: UTC+1 (CET)
  - Summer (DST): UTC+2 (CEST)

Abbekås (Swedish pronunciation: [abɛˈkoːs]) is a locality situated in Skurup Municipality, Skåne County, Sweden with 729 inhabitants in 2010.
