= Enskiftet =

Enskiftet was an agricultural land reform in Sweden in 1803-1807. Its purpose was to replace the scattered farmland in village communities to connected lands for each farm. This was in fact a continuation of the previous land reform storskiftet, but it was more radical and effective, as it did not merely divide the land, as the previous reform, but also forced the villagers to move their farms from the village closer to the land they had been given, which signified the end of traditional village life.

Enskiftet was initiated in the province of Scania by Carl Gideon Wadman at the estate Svaneholm Castle, owned by Rutger Macklean. In 1785, Macklean had the 701 villagers of his estate evicted and forced to relocate their homes on the new land he divided to them. The experiment was deemed so successful, that the government enforced it in the entire province in 1803. In 1807, the reform was enforced in all of Sweden. In practice, however, the reform was never as thoroughly enforced in other provinces as it was in Scania, and in Finland, the reform was not quite given the time to be introduced until the Finnish War.

The reform was followed by the laga skiftet of 1827, which did not force the peasants to abandon their villages and relocate, but did finish the reform introduced by the storskiftet in 1749.
