= Nygård, Sweden =

Nygård
- Location within Västra Götaland Location within Sweden
- Coordinates: 58°03′N 12°13′E
- Country: Sweden
- Province: Västergötland
- County: Västra Götaland County
- Municipality: Lilla Edet Municipality

Area
  - Total: 0.67 km^{2} (0.26 sq mi)

Population (31 December 2010)
  - Total: 419
  - Density: 625/km^{2} (1,620/sq mi)
- Time zone: UTC+1 (CET)
  - Summer (DST): UTC+2 (CEST)

Nygård is a locality situated in Lilla Edet Municipality, Västra Götaland County, Sweden. It had 419 inhabitants in 2010.
