= Roknäs =

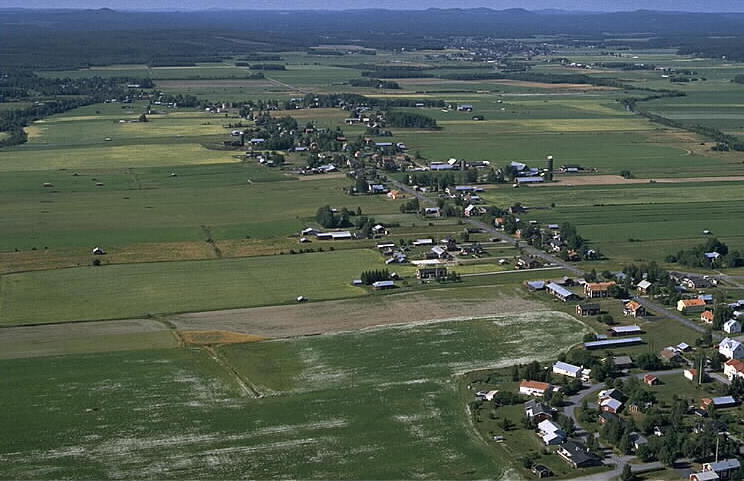

- Location within Norrbotten Location within Sweden
- Coordinates: 65°21′N 21°12′E
- Country: Sweden
- Province: Norrbotten
- County: Norrbotten County
- Municipality: Piteå Municipality

Area
  - Total: 3.05 km^{2} (1.18 sq mi)

Population (31 December 2010)
  - Total: 1,238
  - Density: 405/km^{2} (1,050/sq mi)
- Time zone: UTC+1 (CET)
  - Summer (DST): UTC+2 (CEST)

Roknäs is a locality or village is a situated in Piteå Municipality, Norrbotten County, Sweden with 1,238 inhabitants in 2010. There is a school, a library, a restaurant and a football field in the village. The distanse to Piteå is about 10 kilometres, where there are many shops, restaurants and general city life.
