= Lilla Edet Municipality =

Lilla Edet Municipality Lilla Edets kommun
- Municipality
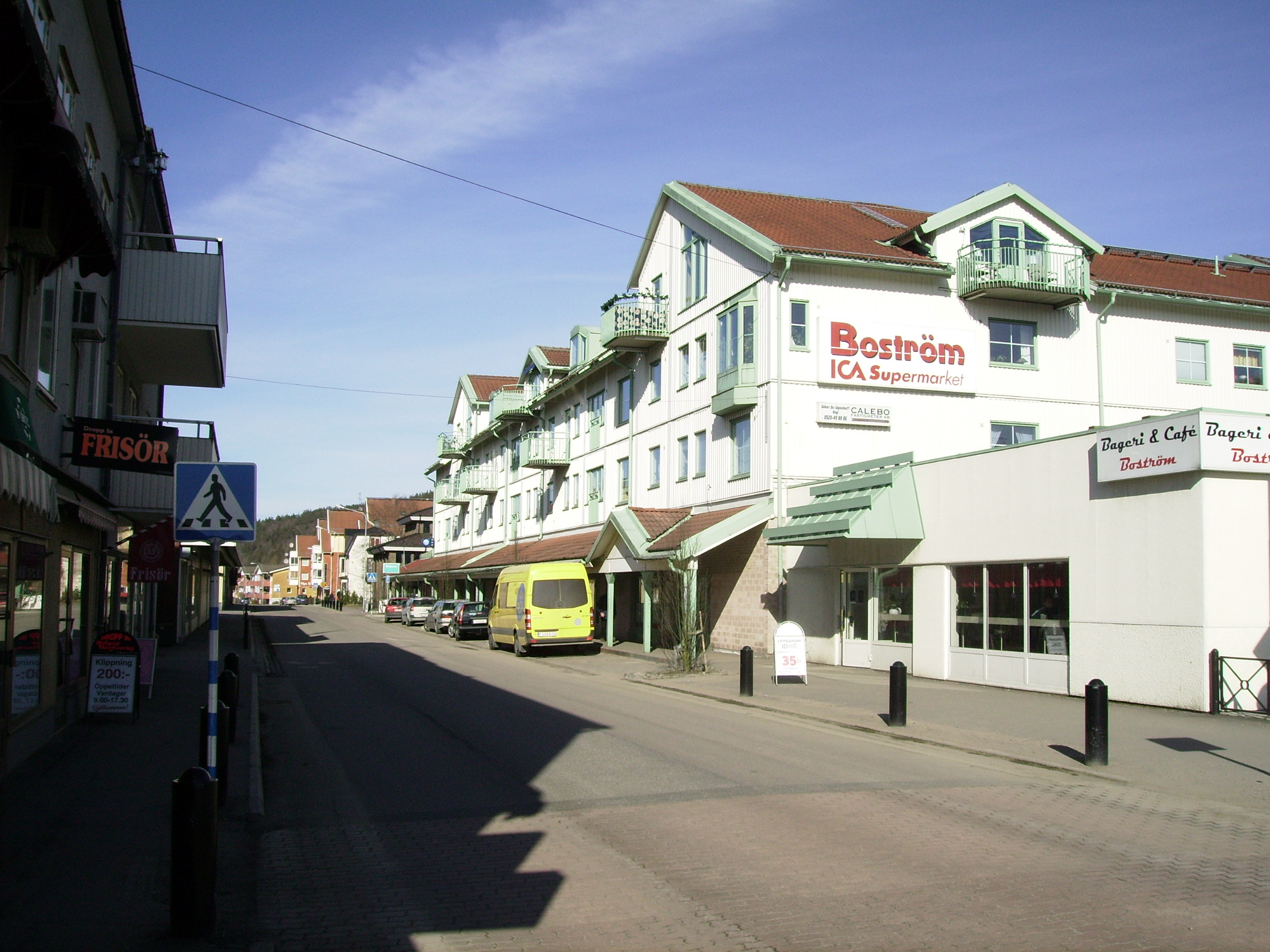

- Coat of arms

- Coordinates: 58°08′N 12°08′E
- Country: Sweden
- County: Västra Götaland County
- Seat: Lilla Edet

Area
  - Total: 341.7841 km^{2} (131.9636 sq mi)
  - Land: 315.6441 km^{2} (121.8709 sq mi)
  - Water: 26.14 km^{2} (10.09 sq mi)
- Area as of 1 January 2014.

Population (30 June 2025)
  - Total: 14,441
  - Density: 45.751/km^{2} (118.49/sq mi)
- Time zone: UTC+1 (CET)
  - Summer (DST): UTC+2 (CEST)
- ISO 3166 code: SE
- Province: Västergötland and Bohuslän
- Municipal code: 1462
- Website: www.lillaedet.se

Lilla Edet Municipality (Swedish: Lilla Edets kommun) is a municipality in Västra Götaland County in western Sweden. Its seat is located in the town of Lilla Edet.

The present municipality was formed in 1971, when the market town (köping) Lilla Edet (instituted as late as 1951) was merged with Flundre (part of), Inlands Torpe and Lödöse.

Population figures from Statistics Sweden as of December 31, 2005.

- Lilla Edet (seat) (pop. 4,936)
- Lödöse (pop. 1,265)
- Göta (pop. 962)
- Nygård (pop. 436)
- Hjärtum (pop. 384)

Of these localities, Lödöse is nationally known for being the original location of the city of Gothenburg. In the medieval age it was a busy city and hosted an important Swedish harbor, until it was moved to its present location in 1473, and little remained. Today it has an interesting museum with many objects.

== Industry ==
The largest employer in Lilla Edet Municipality apart from the government is the paper mill "SCA Hygiene Products AB Edet Bruk", with some 500 employees. It has been in operation for some 120 years, and is best known today for its manufacturing of the toilet paper brand "Edet", available in every store in Sweden.

== Demographics ==
This is a demographic table based on Lilla Edet Municipality's electoral districts in the 2022 Swedish general election sourced from SVT's election platform, in turn taken from SCB official statistics.

In total there were 14,502 residents, including 10,601 Swedish citizens of voting age. 41.7% voted for the left coalition and 56.5% for the right coalition. Indicators are in percentage points except population totals and income.

Location	Residents	Citizen adults	Left vote	Right vote	Employed	Swedish parents	Foreign heritage	Income SEK	Degree
Location			%	%					
Göta	1,991	1,334	39.1	59.7	78	63	37	25,746	29
Hjärtum-Utby	1,724	1,366	42.7	55.8	85	89	11	27,496	34
Lilla Edet N	1,909	1,419	48.9	48.4	75	65	35	23,021	24
Lilla Edet S	1,805	1,286	40.2	58.0	77	66	34	23,856	24
Lödöse-Tunge	2,025	1,419	43.9	54.3	82	80	20	26,574	40
Nygård-Prässebo	1,733	1,315	38.2	59.4	85	84	16	26,463	29
Ström	1,680	1,197	44.1	54.4	78	73	27	24,421	25
Västerlanda	1,635	1,265	37.0	61.7	86	86	14	27,114	29
Source: SVT

== Friendship cities ==
- Nurmijärvi, Finland
