= Sätra SK =

Swedish sports club

- Full name: Sätra sportklubb
- Sport: soccer bandy, table tennis, ice hockey, figure skating, swimming (earlier)
- Team history: Sätrahöjdens SK (1967–1968)
- Based in: Sätra, Sweden

Sätra SK is a sports club in Sätra, Sweden, established in October 1967 as Sätrahöjdens SK before changing name some months later. 10 years after establishment, it had become a bandy and soccer-club only, since the early 1980s club's main focus is women's and girls' soccer.

The women's soccer team, which was started in 1969, played three seasons in the Swedish top division between 1978 and 1980.
