= Rydsgård =

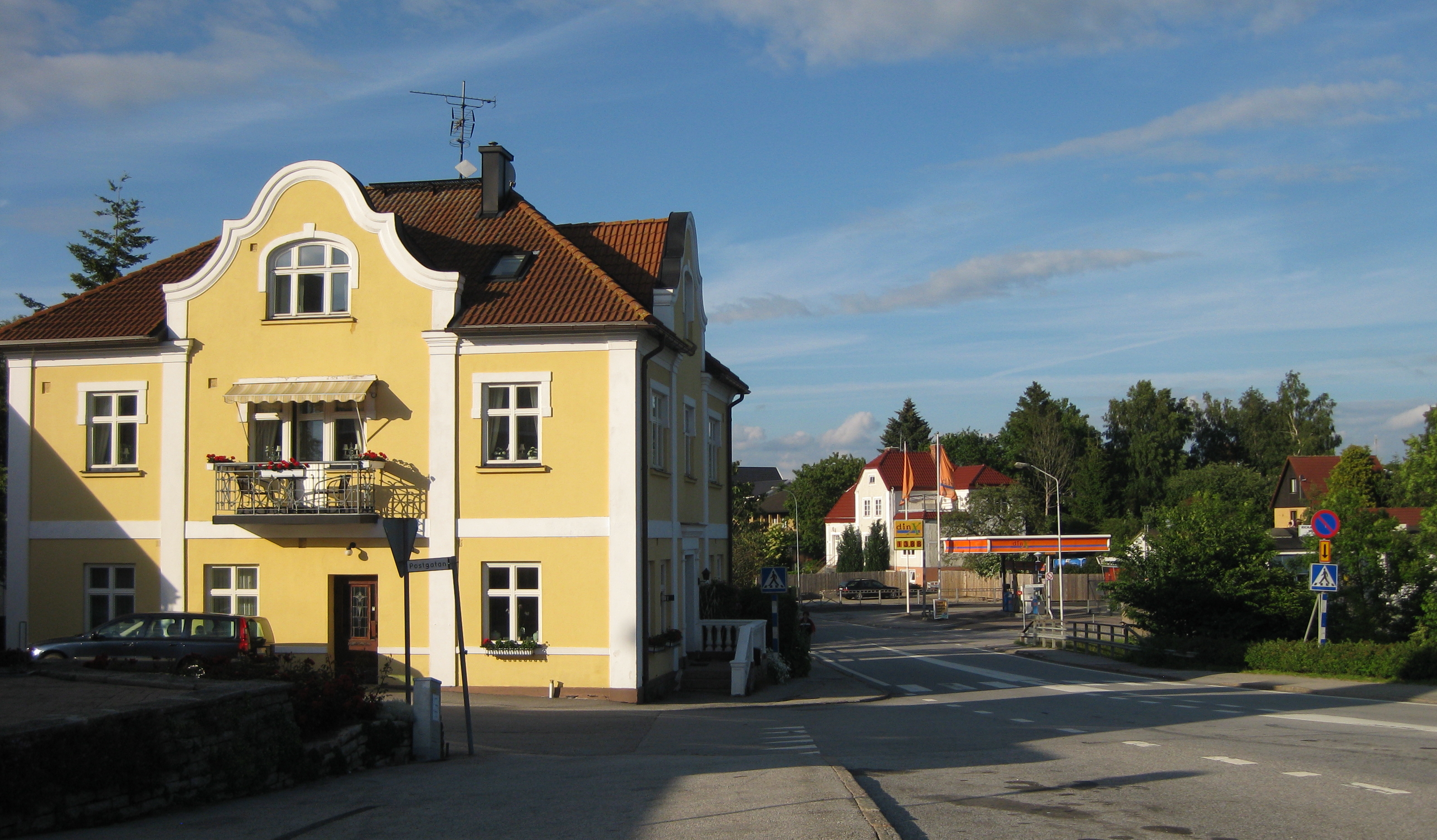
- Main street, Rydsgård

- Location within Skåne Location within Sweden
- Coordinates: 55°28′N 13°36′E
- Country: Sweden
- Province: Skåne
- County: Skåne County
- Municipality: Skurup Municipality

Area
  - Total: 1.16 km^{2} (0.45 sq mi)

Population (31 December 2010)
  - Total: 1,361
  - Density: 1,169/km^{2} (3,030/sq mi)
- Time zone: UTC+1 (CET)
  - Summer (DST): UTC+2 (CEST)

Rydsgård is a locality situated in Skurup Municipality, Skåne County, Sweden with 1,361 inhabitants in 2010.
