= Solskifte =

Land tenure system

The solskifte system was a land tenure system that developed in the Early Middle Ages, but was formalised in Swedish law around 1350. Solskifte means sun division and is a way of allocating land within the community, such that each farmer get an equal access to the sun through the year. This was an important feature in a mountainous and northern nation like Sweden. The system was exported with the Viking conquest to parts of England and Finland, where evidence of it remains in the modern landscape.

In this method of tenure, a community was composed of a village and the surrounding lands. The village was divided into individual tofts (where the residences were built) and into fields where agriculture took place. As each field had different properties and grades of yield, the fields were divided into strips and distributed such that each family in the village received access to (usually) equivalent portion of good and bad fields. The village was then administered by a hallmoot court and the communities by-laws.
