= Skurup =

Skurup, Sweden
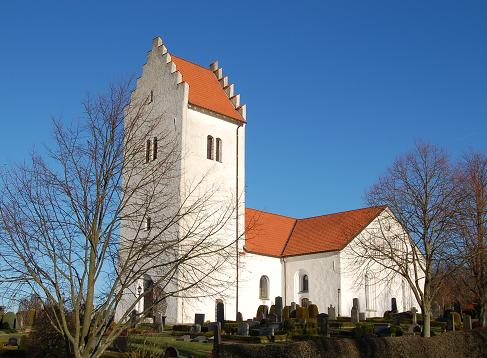
- Skurup Church

- Coat of arms
- Interactive map of Skurup, Sweden
- Coordinates: 55°29′N 13°30′E
- Country: Sweden
- County: Skåne County
- Municipality: Skurup Municipality

Area
  - Total: 4.77 km^{2} (1.84 sq mi)

Population (31 December 2010)
  - Total: 7,565
  - Density: 1,587/km^{2} (4,110/sq mi)
- Time zone: UTC+1 (CET)
  - Summer (DST): UTC+2 (CEST)

Skurup is a locality and the seat of Skurup Municipality, Skåne County, Sweden with 7,565 inhabitants in 2010.
