= Hjärtum =

- Location within Västra Götaland Location within Sweden
- Coordinates: 58°08′N 12°08′E
- Country: Sweden
- Province: Bohuslän
- County: Västra Götaland County
- Municipality: Lilla Edet Municipality

Area
  - Total: 0.49 km^{2} (0.19 sq mi)

Population (31 December 2010)
  - Total: 367
  - Density: 754/km^{2} (1,950/sq mi)
- Time zone: UTC+1 (CET)
  - Summer (DST): UTC+2 (CEST)

Hjärtum is a locality situated in Lilla Edet Municipality, Västra Götaland County, Sweden. It had 367 inhabitants in 2010.

It is situated on the western side of the Göta älv, a main river on the west coast of Sweden. The name Hjärtum originates from the words "hjort" (deer) and "hem" (home), meaning "home of the deers" and was first written down in the 13th century. From the same century is the oldest parts of the church, from which a great view of the river valley can be seen.

Hjärtum parish reaches from Ström, opposite of Lilla Edet, in the south, to Åkerström in the north and had 3202 residents 2004.
