= Svaneholm Castle =

Castle in Skurup Municipality, Scania, Sweden

- Svaneholms slott
- Skurup Municipality
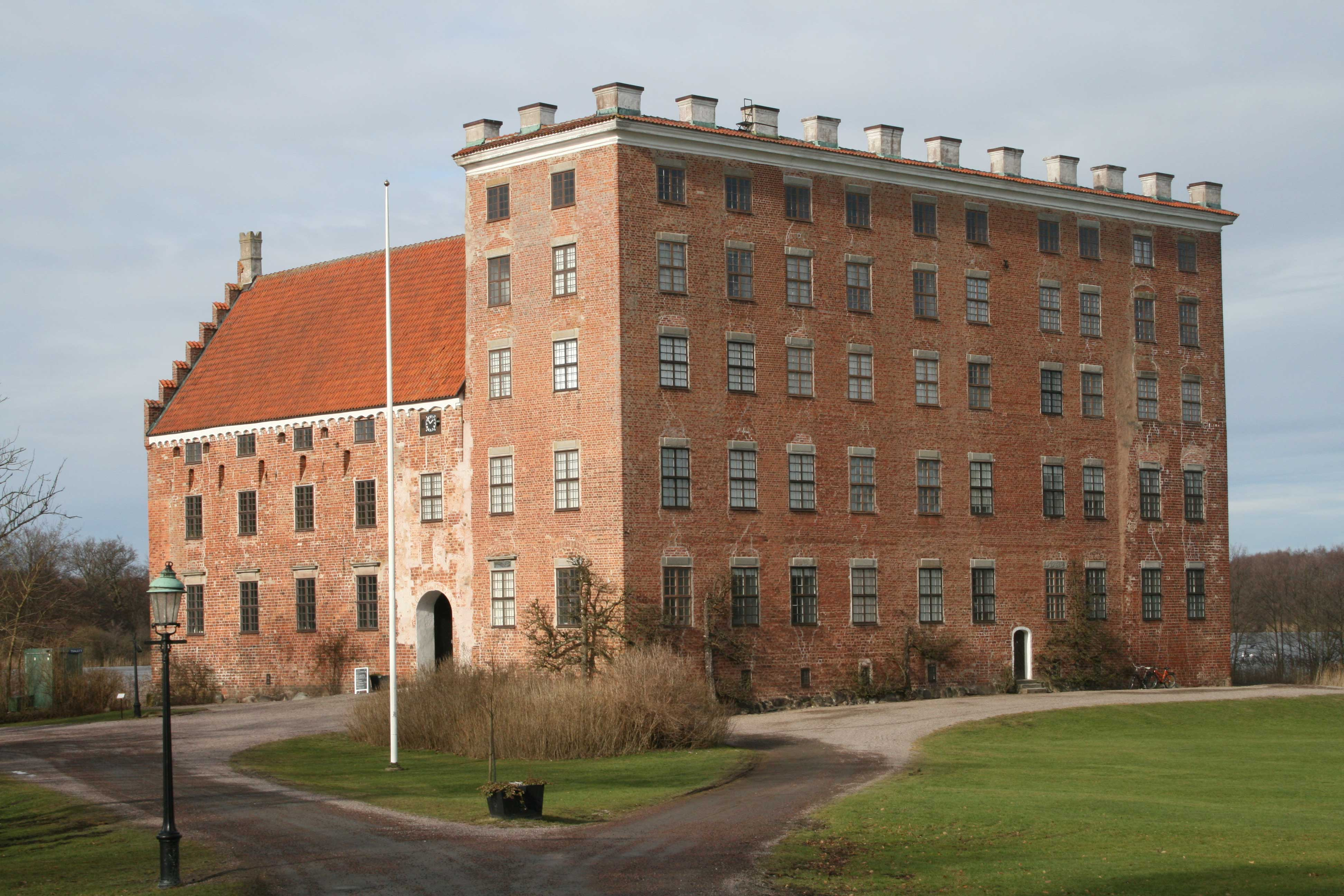
- Svaneholm Castle

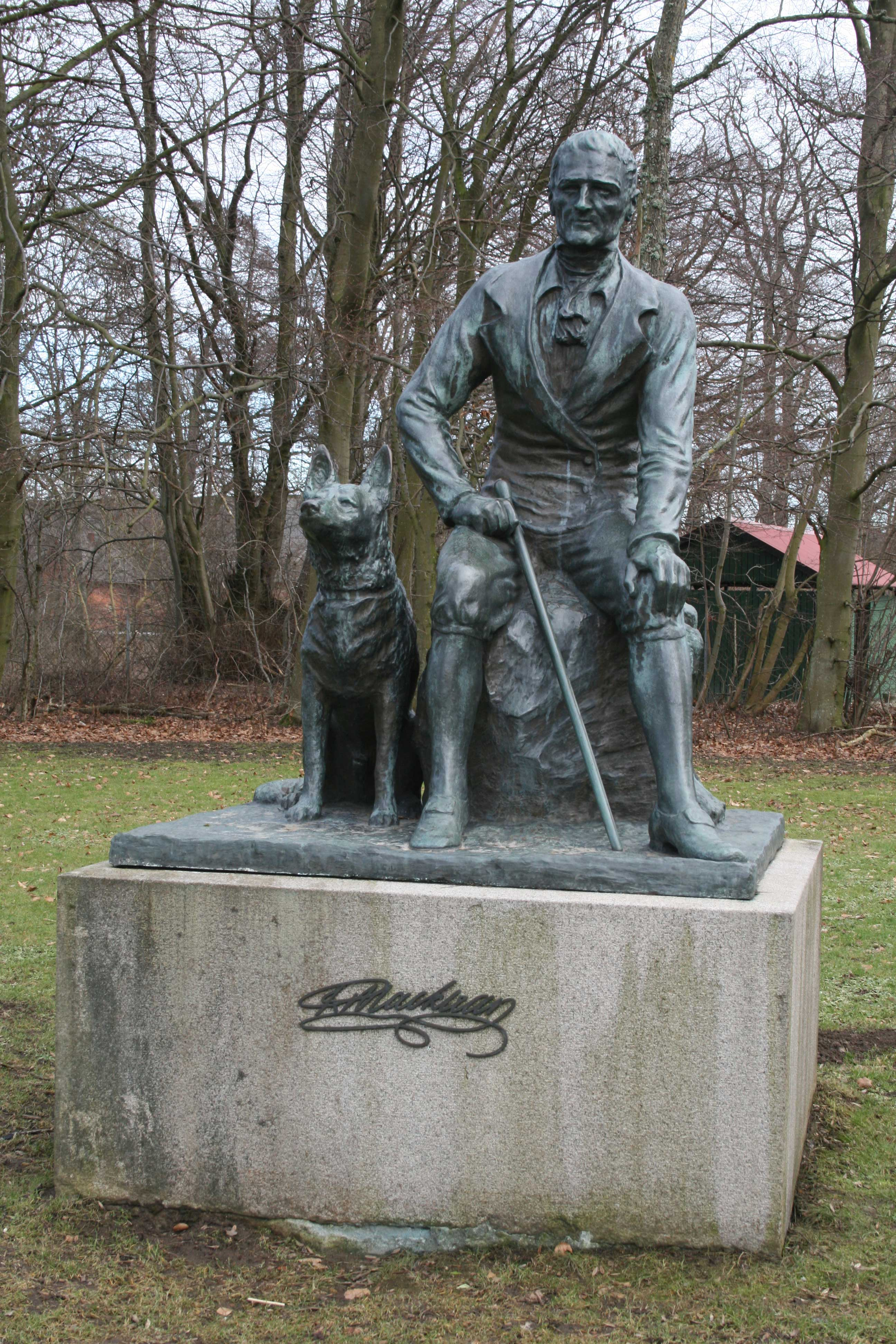
- Statue of Rutger Maclean — "The reformer of Scanian agriculture"

Site information
- Type: Castle
- Open to the public: Yes

Location
- Scania, Sweden
- Location within Skåne
- Coordinates: 55.5008°N 13.4781°E

Site history
- Built: 1530s

Svaneholm Castle (Swedish: Svaneholms slott) is located on the shore of Lake Svaneholmssjön in Skurup Municipality, Scania, Sweden. It has been used as a filming location including for the TV series Wallander.

== History ==
During the Middle Ages the residence was called Skurdorp (Skudrup), which was fortified and situated next to the parish church, where remains still can be seen. During the midst of the fifteenth century it was owned by guardsman Henning Meyenstorp (Meinstrup) and through marriage it later came to the possession of the Sparre-family. Approximately 1530 the residence was moved from Skurup to an islet in the Lake Svaneholmssjön, after that it was called Svaneholm. Svaneholm Castle was initially erected in the 1530s by the Danish knight and royal advisor Mourids Jepsen Sparre (1480–1534).

Through inheritance and purchase, in 1611 Svaneholm Castle came to the possession of Prebend Gyllenstierna (1656–1677). At the death of his great-grandson Axel Gyllenstierna in 1705, the castle went to the nephew Axel Julius Coyet (1692–1719) by will, but 1723 his aunt Sofie Gyllenstierna gained half of the properties via trial. Her half was 1751 bought by baron Gustaf Julius Coyet (1717–1782). In 1782 it was inherited by Coyet's nephew, baron Rutger Macklean (1742–1816). Agricultural reforms introduced by Macklean became the law in Scania in 1803 and in the rest of Sweden in 1827.

At Maclean's death in 1816, Svaneholm Castle was inherited by his nephew Kjell Christoffer Bennet and his three siblings, 1839 it was sold to chamberlain Carl Johan Hallenborg, and belonged to his son and grandchild until 1902 when it was redeemed by count Carl Augustin Ehrensvärd (1854–1934), who was married to Eva Augusta Hallenborg (1864–1947).

== Today ==
A year after the death of Ehrensvärd in 1934, Svaneholm Castle, the park, the garden, most of the lake and the surrounding forest was purchased by the Svaneholm Castle Cooperative Society (Swedish: Svaneholms slott andelsförening). The castle now houses a museum run by Wemmenhög Hundred's Monuments and Home District Society (Swedish: Wemmenhögs härads fornminnes- och hembygdsförening).
