= 2025 BK Häcken FF season =

Häcken
2025 season
- Head coach: Mak Lind
- Stadium: Bravida Arena, Brämaregården
- Damallsvenskan: 1st
- Svenska Cupen: Group stage
- Champions League: Third qualifying round
- Europa Cup: Final
- Top goalscorer: League: Felicia Schröder (30); All: Felicia Schröder (31)
- Highest home attendance: 4,814 v Hammarby; Damallsvenskan; 11 October 2025
- Lowest home attendance: 621 v Växjö; Damallsvenskan; 19 April 2025
- Average home league attendance: 1,812
- Biggest win: 10–0 v Rosso Udevalla (A); Svenska Cupen; 5 November 2025
- Biggest defeat: 0–2 v Kristianstad (A); Damallsvenskan; 29 March 2025; 1–3 v Norrköping (H); Damallsvenskan; 23 August 2025
Home colours	Away colours

The 2025 season is BK Häcken's 29th season in the Damallsvenskan, the top flight of women's football in Sweden. Alongside competing in the Damallsvenskan, Häcken are also competing in the Svenska Cupen and in the qualifying rounds of the inaugural UEFA Women's Europa Cup (UWEC) after being knocked out of the UEFA Women's Champions League (UWCL) in the third qualifying round.

BK Häcken won the Damallsvenskan title for just the second time in history and the first since 2020 (when the club was known as Kopparbergs/Göteborg FC), following a 2–0 away victory over Djurgårdens IF on 8 November 2025.

== Squad ==
As of 8 January 2025

Note: Flags indicate national team as defined under FIFA eligibility rules; some limited exceptions apply. Players may hold more than one non-FIFA nationality.

No.	Pos.	Nation	Player
1	GK	ISL	Fanney Inga Birkisdóttir
3	DF	AUS	Aivi Luik
4	DF	SWE	Emma Östlund
5	MF	CAN	Carly Wickenheiser
6	DF	DEN	Emilie Byrnak
7	MF	DEN	Pernille Sanvig (on loan from Eintracht Frankfurt)
9	FW	SWE	Felicia Schröder
10	FW	SWE	Anna Anvegård
11	FW	SWE	Monica Jusu Bah
12	FW	DEN	Stine Sandbech
13	GK	SWE	Jennifer Falk
14	FW	SWE	Matilda Nildén

No.	Pos.	Nation	Player
15	DF	SWE	Alva Selerud
17	MF	MWI	Faith Chinzimu
18	DF	SWE	Lisa Löwing
19	DF	SWE	Nesrin Akgün
20	DF	SWE	Hanna Wijk
21	MF	DEN	Jóhanna Fossdalsá
22	FW	SWE	Paulina Nyström
23	MF	SWE	Elin Rubensson
24	FW	USA	Tabby Tindell
25	MF	SWE	Alice Bergström
26	MF	SWE	Nathalie Staaf
30	MF	BRA	Helena Sampaio

== Transfers ==
=== Transfers in ===
Date	Position	Nationality	Name	From	Ref.
2 August 2025	MF	(Malawi)	Faith Chinzimu	(Malawi) Ascent Academy	
18 November 2025	DF	(Sweden)	Josefin Baudou	(Sweden) IK Uppsala	
20 November 2025	FW	(Iceland)	Thelma Pálmadóttir	(Iceland) FH Hafnarfjörður	

=== Loans in ===
Date	Position	Nationality	Name	From	Ref.
5 August 2025	MF	(Denmark)	Pernille Sanvig	(Germany) Eintracht Frankfurt	

=== Transfers out ===
Date	Position	Nationality	Name	To	Ref.
9 July 2025	DF	(Japan)	Hikaru Kitagawa	(England) Everton	
26 July 2025	MF	(Sweden)	Alexandra Larsson	(United States) USC Trojans	
30 December 2025	DF	(Sweden)	Hanna Wijk	(England) Tottenham Hotspur	
31 December 2025	FW	(Sweden)	Matilda Nildén	(England) Tottenham Hotspur	

=== Loans out ===
Date	Position	Nationality	Name	To	Ref.
7 January 2025	GK	(Sweden)	Jennifer Falk	(England) Liverpool	

== Friendlies ==
20 November 2024 Friendly	Ajax (Netherlands)	4–4	(Sweden) BK Häcken	's-Gravenzande
13:00		Report		Stadium: Juliana Sportpark

25 January 2025 Friendly	VfL Wolfsburg (Germany)	4–0	(Sweden) BK Häcken	Wolfsburg
15:00	Minge 7'; Beerensteyn 45+1' (pen.); Kielland 45+3'; Blomqvist 65'	Report		Stadium: AOK Stadion

9 February 2025 Friendly	BK Häcken (Sweden)	1–2	(Denmark) FC Nordsjælland	Gothenburg
13:00		Report		Stadium: Bravida Arena; Attendance: 103; Referee: Soroush Mahmoudi

9 February 2025 Friendly	BK Häcken (Sweden)	3–2	(Denmark) Fortuna Hjørring	Gothenburg
13:00		Report		Stadium: Valhalla IP; Attendance: 57; Referee: Soroush Mahmoudi

1 March 2025 Friendly	IF Elfsborg	1–1	BK Häcken	Borås
				Stadium: Borås Arena

27 July 2025 Friendly	Vålerenga (Norway)	1–0	(Sweden) BK Häcken	Oslo
14:00	Preus 12'	Report		Stadium: Intility Arena

2 August 2025 Friendly	BK Häcken	6–2	Kristianstads DFF	Borås
15:00	Jusu Bah 5', 52'; Schröder 20'; Anvegård 28'; Tindell 49'; Nildén 76'	Report	Olsson 1'; Andersson Widén 86'	Stadium: Borås Arena; Referee: Abd Khaled

== Damallsvenskan ==
=== League table ===
Pos	Team	Pld	W	D	L	GF	GA	GD	Pts	Qualification or relegation
1	BK Häcken (C)	26	21	1	4	86	17	+69	64	Qualification for the Champions League second round
2	Hammarby IF	26	19	3	4	72	19	+53	60	Qualification for the Champions League second round
3	Malmö FF	26	18	3	5	58	27	+31	57	Qualification for the Champions League second round
4	Djurgårdens IF	26	15	5	6	49	38	+11	50	
5	IFK Norrköping	26	13	7	6	37	33	+4	46	

Source: Swedish Football Association (in Swedish)
Rules for classification: 1) Points; 2) Goal difference; 3) Number of goals scored; 4) Head-to-head points; 5) Head-to-head goal difference; 6) Head-to-head away goals scored
(C) Champions

=== Results summary ===
Overall								Home						Away					
Pld	W	D	L	GF	GA	GD	Pts	W	D	L	GF	GA	GD	W	D	L	GF	GA	GD
26	21	1	4	86	17	+69	64	10	1	2	44	12	+32	11	0	2	42	5	+37

Last updated: 16 November 2025.
Source: SvFF

=== Results by matchweek ===
Round	1	2	3	4	5	6	7	8	9	10	11	12	13	14	15	16	17	18	19	20	21	22	23	24	25	26
Ground	H	A	H	H	A	A	H	H	A	A	H	A	H	A	H	A	H	A	H	A	A	H	A	H	A	H
Result	L	L	W	W	W	L	W	W	W	W	W	W	W	W	L	W	D	W	W	W	W	W	W	W	W	W
Position	9	11	9	7	5	5	5	4	3	2	2	1	1	1	3	2	3	3	3	2	1	1	1	1	1	1

Source: SvFF
A = Away; H = Home; W = Win; D = Draw; L = Loss

=== Results ===
23 March 2025 Matchweek 1	BK Häcken	2–3	Malmö FF	Gothenburg
15:10	Nildén (yellow card) 35'; Schröder 36'; Tindell 81'	Report	D'Aquila 5', 15'; Persson (yellow card) 38'; Öhman (yellow card) 41'; Kanutte Fornes 82'	Stadium: Bravida Arena; Attendance: 2,719; Referee: Maral Mirzai

29 March 2025 Matchweek 2	Kristianstads DFF	2–0	BK Häcken	Kristianstad
14:00	Olsson 8'; Jóhannsdóttir 41' (yellow card) 63'; Siemsen (yellow card) 71'	Report	Tindell (yellow card) 23'; Rubensson (yellow card) 51'	Stadium: Kristianstads Fotbollsarena; Attendance: 722; Referee: Ulrica Löv

13 April 2025 Matchweek 3	BK Häcken	5–1	Vittsjö GIK	Gothenburg
15:00	Schröder 9', 11', 24', 77' (yellow card) 87'; Wijk (yellow card) 88'; Sandbech 90+7'	Report	Ekengren 17'; Nyby (yellow card) 62'; Rechuwa (yellow card) 80'	Stadium: Bravida Arena; Attendance: 1,036; Referee: Cecilia Ekwall

19 April 2025 Matchweek 4	BK Häcken	3–1	Växjö DFF	Gothenburg
15:00	Schröder 12', 67'; Jusu Bah 24'; Akgün (yellow card) 86'	Report	Harrysson (yellow card) 28'; Russell 54'	Stadium: Bravida Arena; Attendance: 621; Referee: Ulrica Löv

26 April 2025 Matchweek 5	IFK Norrköping	0–4	BK Häcken	Norrköping
15:00	Veber (yellow card) 90+2'	Report	Jusu Bah 12', 74'; Lind (yellow card) 52'; Handfast 63' (o.g.); Nyström 80'; Schröder (yellow card) 86'	Stadium: Nya Parken; Attendance: 708; Referee: Ulrica Löv

5 May 2025 Matchweek 6	Hammarby IF	1–0	BK Häcken	Stockholm
19:00	Blakstad 54'; Edrud (yellow card) 64'	Report	Wickenheiser (yellow card) 44'; Östlund (yellow card) 84'	Stadium: Hammarby IP; Attendance: 2,016; Referee: Hanna Laajanen

11 May 2025 Matchweek 7	BK Häcken	6–1	IF Brommapojkarna	Gothenburg
15:00	Schröder 10', 20', 25'; Tindell 29', 38'; Selerud 90+2'	Report	Olsson (yellow card) 31'; Bengtsson (yellow card) 46'; Lillbäck 63'	Stadium: Bravida Arena; Attendance: 1,106; Referee: George Jansizian

16 May 2025 Matchweek 8	BK Häcken	6–1	Alingsås IF	Gothenburg
18:00	Schröder 20'; Jusu Bah 44'; Lundin 58' (o.g.); Östlund 60'; Bergström 62'; Sampaio 70'	Report	Lundin 63'	Stadium: Bravida Arena; Attendance: 1,306; Referee: Cecilia Ekwall

24 May 2025 Matchweek 9	FC Rosengård	0–1	BK Häcken	Malmö
15:00	Johannsson (yellow card) 31'	Report	Wickenheiser (yellow card) 13'; Lind (yellow card) 32'; Jusu Bah 56'	Stadium: Malmö IP; Attendance: 448; Referee: Hanna Laajanen

9 June 2025 Matchweek 10	Linköping FC	0–5	BK Häcken	Linköping
19:00		Report	Anvegård 13'; Kitagawa 50'; Nyström 77'; Brenn 90+4' (o.g.)	Stadium: Linköping Arena; Attendance: 577; Referee: Amane Kandas

14 June 2025 Matchweek 11	BK Häcken	6–0	AIK Stockholm	Gothenburg
15:00	Wickenheiser 12', 23'; Luik (yellow card) 43'; Schröder 48'; Fossdalsá 60'; Nyström 84', 86'	Report	Plan (yellow card) 31'	Stadium: Bravida Arena; Attendance: 1,511; Referee: Maral Mirzai

19 June 2025 Matchweek 12	Piteå IF	0–5	BK Häcken	Piteå
19:00	Henriksson (red card); Brzykcy (yellow card) 75'	Report	Schröder 18', 45+1' (pen.); Luik (yellow card) 39'; Nyström 79'	Stadium: LF Arena; Attendance: 627; Referee: Lovisa Johansson

9 August 2025 Matchweek 13	BK Häcken	4–1	Djurgårdens IF	Gothenburg
16:00	Bergström (yellow card) 54'; Schröder 65', 69', 76', 90+5'; Sandbech (yellow card) 82'	Report	Karlsson Törnvi (yellow card) 52'; Åsland 89'	Stadium: Bravida Arena; Attendance: 1,529; Referee: Lovisa Johansson

17 August 2025 Matchweek 14	Växjö DFF	0–5	BK Häcken	Växjö
14:00	Unogård (yellow card) 76'	Report	Schröder 20'; Fossdalsá (yellow card) 45+2'; Tindell 48', 61'; Anvegård 62'; Jusu Bah 72'	Stadium: Spiris Arena; Attendance: 404; Referee: Maral Mirzai

23 August 2025 Matchweek 15	BK Häcken	1–3	IFK Norrköping	Gothenburg
16:00	Schröder 32'; Wickenheiser (yellow card) 64'; Dahlberg (yellow card) 72'; Nildén 90+3'	Report	De La Harpe (yellow card) 29'; Jones (yellow card) 44'; Handfast 62'; Leskinen 65' (yellow card) 68' (yellow-red card) 90+3'; Leidhammar 72'	Stadium: Bravida Arena; Attendance: 1,360; Referee: Lovisa Johansson

31 August 2025 Matchweek 16	Vittsjö GIK	0–4	BK Häcken	Vittsjö
13:00	Blagojević (yellow card) 62'; Rewucha (yellow card) 65'; Mårtensson (yellow card) 69'; Lindgren (yellow card) 88'	Report	Sandbech (yellow card) 14'; Jusu Bah 41', 48'; Schröder 84', 90+7'	Stadium: Vittsjö IP; Attendance: 713; Referee: Amane Kandas

6 September 2025 Matchweek 17	BK Häcken	1–1	Kristianstads DFF	Gothenburg
16:00	Wickenheiser 38'	Report	Egnér 15'; Persson (yellow card) 19'; Olsson (yellow card) 23'; Roberts (yellow card) 82'	Stadium: Bravida Arena; Attendance: 1,310; Referee: Tess Olofsson

21 September 2025 Matchweek 19	BK Häcken	3–0	FC Rosengård	Gothenburg
16:00	Schröder (yellow card) 3' (goal) 68'; Cronquist 72' (o.g.); Nildén 80'	Report		Stadium: Bravida Arena; Attendance: 1,464; Referee: Eva Svärdsudd

29 September 2025 Matchweek 20	AIK Stockholm	2–5	BK Häcken	Stockholm
18:00	Dahlqvist 12'; Sembrant (yellow card) 43'; Papadopoulos (yellow card) 52'; Grabus 55' (pen.)	Report	Wickenheiser (yellow card) 37'; Schröder 45'; Anvegård 61', 75'; Bergström 70'; Sampaio (yellow card) 79' (goal) 84'	Stadium: Skytteholms IP; Attendance: 488; Referee: Maral Mirzai

1 October 2025 Matchweek 18	Malmö FF	0–3	BK Häcken	Malmö
18:30	Lilja (yellow card) 33'; Nevin (yellow card) 63'	Report	Anvegård 48'; Bergström 52'; Wickenheiser (yellow card) 67'; Tindell 85'	Stadium: Eleda Stadion; Attendance: 1,183; Referee: Lovisa Johansson

4 October 2025 Matchweek 21	Alingsås IF	0–2	BK Häcken	Alingsås
16:00	Barth (yellow card) 72'	Report	Sandbech 45+3'; Anvegård 82' (pen.)	Stadium: Mjörnvallen; Attendance: 305; Referee: Toni Galić

12 October 2025 Matchweek 22	BK Häcken	2–0	Hammarby IF	Gothenburg
15:00	Tindell 12'; Anvegård 25'	Report		Stadium: Bravida Arena; Attendance: 4,814; Referee: Hanna Laajanen

19 October 2025 Matchweek 23	IF Brommapojkarna	0–6	BK Häcken	Stockholm
14:00		Report	Jusu Bah 7'; Olsson 25' (o.g.); Sandbech 41'; Sampaio (yellow card) 48' (goal) 58'; Anvegård 52'; Wickenheiser (yellow card) 73' (goal) 79'	Stadium: Grimsta IP; Attendance: 140; Referee: Selma Griberg

2 November 2025 Matchweek 24	BK Häcken	4–0	Linköping FC	Gothenburg
16:00	Jusu Bah 3'; Schröder 11', 47' (pen.); Anvegård 74'	Report	Hoelsbrekken Eckhoff (yellow card) 79'	Stadium: Bravida Arena; Attendance: 1,669; Referee: Cecilia Ekwall

8 November 2025 Matchweek 25	Djurgårdens IF	0–2	BK Häcken	Stockholm
14:00	Ulenius (yellow card) 8'; Wahlström (yellow card) 89'	Report	Tindell 53'; Schröder 79'	Stadium: Kristinebergs IP; Attendance: 1,046; Referee: Eva Svärdsudd

16 November 2025 Matchweek 26	BK Häcken	1–0	Piteå IF	Gothenburg
14:00	Berbatovci (yellow card) 65'; Anvegård 90'	Report		Stadium: Bravida Arena; Attendance: 3,112; Referee: Lovisa Johansson

== Svenska Cupen ==
=== Third round ===
5 November 2025 Third round	Rosso Udevalla	0–10	BK Häcken	Uddevalla
19:00		Report	Nildén 19'; Selerud 29', 90'; Sampaio 30', 44'; Nyström 34', 41'; Wickenheiser 39'; Chinzimu 84'; Ryd 86'	Stadium: Rimnevallen; Attendance: 200; Referee: Cavit Kinali

=== Group stage ===
Pos	Team	Pld	W	D	L	GF	GA	GD	Pts	Qualification	HÄK	AIK	LIN	GEF
1	BK Häcken	3	3	0	0	17	0	+17	9	Advance to the semi-finals		3–0	3–0	
2	AIK	3	2	0	1	3	4	−1	6				1–0	
3	Linköping FC	3	1	0	2	4	4	0	3					4–0
4	Gefle IF	3	0	0	3	1	17	−16	0		0–11	1–2		

Source: Swedish Football Association
Rules for classification: Tiebreakers

23 February 2026	Gefle IF	v	BK Häcken	Gävle
19:00		Report		Stadium: Gavlevallen

11 March 2026	BK Häcken	v	Linköping FC	Gothenburg
19:00		Report		Stadium: Nordic Wellness Arena

15 March 2026	BK Häcken	v	AIK	Gothenburg
13:00		Report		Stadium: Nordic Wellness Arena

== UEFA Women's Champions League ==
=== Third qualifying round ===
11 September 2025 Third qualifying round	BK Häcken (Sweden)	1–1	(Spain) Atlético Madrid	Gothenburg
19:00	Schröder 86'; Larsen (yellow card) 88'	Report	Luany 17'	Stadium: Bravida Arena; Attendance: 3,673; Referee: Ivana Projkovska (North Macedonia)

18 September 2025 Third qualifying round	Atlético Madrid (Spain)	2–1 (a.e.t.)	(Sweden) BK Häcken	Madrid
19:00	Lloris (yellow card) 36'; Bøe Risa (yellow card) 60'; Luany 90+10' (pen.); García (yellow card) 90+11'; Jensen 93'	Report	Anvegård 38'; Löwing (yellow card) 47'; Luik (yellow card) 54'; Anvegård (yellow card) 61'	Stadium: Centro Deportivo Wanda Alcalá de Henares; Attendance: 1,200; Referee: Maria Sole Ferrieri Caputi (Italy)

== UEFA Women's Europa Cup ==
=== Second qualifying round ===
7 October 2025 Second qualifying round	BK Häcken (Sweden)	4–0	(Poland) GKS Katowice	Gothenburg
19:00	Nildén (yellow card) 59'; Sampaio 71', 81', 85'; Nyström 83'	Report		Stadium: Bravida Arena; Attendance: 1,025; Referee: Emanuela Rusta (Albania)

16 October 2025 Second qualifying round	GKS Katowice (Poland)	1–3	(Sweden) BK Häcken	Katowice
18:00	Jaszek 24'	Report	Jusu Bah 17'; Nyström 40' (yellow card) 76'; Zawadzka 73' (o.g.)	Stadium: Arena Katowice; Attendance: 548; Referee: Jelena Međedović (Serbia)

=== Round of 16 ===
12 November 2025 Round of 16	BK Häcken (Sweden)	1–0	(Italy) Inter Milan	Gothenburg
18:30	Rúnarsdóttir 4' (o.g.)	Report		Stadium: Hisingen Arena; Attendance: 2,055; Referee: Kirsty Dowle (England)

19 November 2025 Round of 16	Inter Milan (Italy)	0–0	(Sweden) BK Häcken	Milan
18:30		Report		Stadium: Youth Development Training Centre; Attendance: 374; Referee: Désirée Blanco (Switzerland)

=== Quarter-finals ===
February 2026 Quarter-finals	BK Häcken (Sweden)	7–0	(Iceland) Breiðablik	Gothenburg
18:30	Sampaio 25', 78'; Schröder 30', 35'; Jusu Bah 33'; Pálmadóttir 40'; Nyström 68'	Report		Stadium: Bravida Arena; Attendance: 1,274; Referee: Lina Lehtovaara (Finland)

February 2026 Quarter-finals	Breiðablik (Iceland)	v	(Sweden) BK Häcken	Kópavogur

== Squad statistics ==
As of 20 November 2025

Starting appearances are listed first, followed by substitute appearances after the + symbol where applicable.

No.	Pos	Nat	Player	Total		Damallsvenskan		Svenska Cupen		Champions League		Europa Cup	
No.	Pos	Nat	Player	Apps	Goals	Apps	Goals	Apps	Goals	Apps	Goals	Apps	Goals
1	GK	(Iceland) ISL	Fanney Inga Birkisdóttir	6	0	4	0	1	0	0	0	1	0
3	DF	(Australia) AUS	Aivi Luik	20	0	15+1	0	0	0	2	0	2	0
4	DF	(Sweden) SWE	Emma Östlund	25	1	14+2	1	4	0	0+2	0	2+1	0
5	MF	(Canada) CAN	Carly Wickenheiser	30	5	19+4	4	1	1	2	0	4	0
6	DF	(Denmark) DEN	Emilie Byrnak	14	0	5+6	0	1	0	0	0	2	0
7	MF	(Sweden) SWE	Pernille Sanvig	17	0	4+7	0	0+1	0	0+1	0	3+1	0
9	FW	(Sweden) SWE	Felicia Schröder	31	31	26	30	0	0	2	1	3	0
10	FW	(Sweden) SWE	Anna Anvegård	24	11	13+6	10	0	0	1	1	3+1	0
11	FW	(Sweden) SWE	Monica Jusu Bah	32	11	23+3	10	0	0	2	0	4	1
12	FW	(Denmark) DEN	Stine Sandbech	21	2	8+9	2	0	0	2	0	2	0
13	GK	(Sweden) SWE	Jennifer Falk	28	0	22+1	0	0	0	2	0	3	0
14	FW	(Sweden) SWE	Matilda Nildén	32	2	11+14	1	1	1	0+2	0	1+3	0
15	DF	(Sweden) SWE	Alva Selerud	9	3	0+7	1	1	2	0	0	0+1	0
17	MF	(Malawi) MWI	Faith Chinzimu	3	1	0+1	0	1	1	0	0	0+1	0
18	DF	(Sweden) SWE	Lisa Löwing	22	0	10+8	0	0+1	0	2	0	1	0
19	DF	(Sweden) SWE	Nesrin Akgün	12	0	0+8	0	1	0	0+1	0	2	0
20	DF	(Sweden) SWE	Hanna Wijk	30	0	23+2	0	0	0	1	0	3+1	0
21	MF	(Denmark) DEN	Jóhanna Fossdalsá	21	1	19	1	0	0	2	0	0	0
22	FW	(Sweden) SWE	Paulina Nyström	28	9	2+19	5	1	2	0+2	0	1+3	2
23	MF	(Sweden) SWE	Elin Rubensson	3	0	3	0	0	0	0	0	0	0
24	FW	(United States) USA	Tabby Tindell	31	8	23+2	8	0	0	2	0	3+1	0
25	MF	(Sweden) SWE	Alice Bergström	31	3	24+1	3	0	0	2	0	4	0
26	MF	(Sweden) SWE	Nathalie Staaf	3	0	0+2	0	1	0	0	0	0	0
30	MF	(Brazil) BRA	Helena Sampaio	30	8	9+14	3	1	2	0+2	0	1+3	3
31	MF	(Sweden) SWE	Giulia Benvenuti	1	0	0	0	0+1	0	0	0	0	0
32	MF	(Sweden) SWE	Hilda Ryd	1	1	0	0	0+1	1	0	0	0	0
33	FW	(Sweden) SWE	Elna Angus	1	0	0	0	0+1	0	0	0	0	0
Players who left the club during the season
8	DF	(Japan) JPN	Hikaru Kitagawa	10	1	9+1	1	0	0	0	0	0	0
26	MF	(Sweden) SWE	Alexandra Larsson	4	0	0+4	0	0	0	0	0	0	0

- Source: Swedish Football Association

== See also ==
- 2025 BK Häcken season
