= 2026 UEFA Women's Europa Cup final =

Association football match

- Event: 2025–26 UEFA Women's Europa Cup
Hammarby IF	BK Häcken
(Sweden)	(Sweden)
2	4
- on aggregate

First leg
Hammarby IF	BK Häcken
0	1
- Date: 25 April 2026
- Venue: 3Arena, Stockholm
- Player of the Match: Felicia Schröder (BK Häcken)
- Referee: Silvia Gasperotti (Italy)
- Attendance: 7,597
- Weather: Rain; 7 °C (45 °F); 57% humidity

Second leg
BK Häcken	Hammarby IF
3	2
- Date: 1 May 2026
- Venue: Hisingen Arena, Gothenburg
- Player of the Match: Felicia Schröder (BK Häcken)
- Referee: Marta Huerta de Aza (Spain)
- Attendance: 5,566
- Weather: Sunny; 18 °C (64 °F); 34% humidity

The 2026 UEFA Women's Europa Cup final was the final tie of the 2025–26 UEFA Women's Europa Cup, the inaugural season of the UEFA Women's Europa Cup, Europe's secondary women's club football tournament organised by UEFA. The final was played over two legs and contested by Swedish clubs Hammarby IF and BK Häcken.

The first leg was played on 25 April 2026 at the 3Arena in Stockholm, with visitors BK Häcken winning 1–0. The second leg, played on 1 May 2026 at the Hisingen Arena in Gothenburg, was won 3–2 by BK Häcken, securing a 4–2 on aggregate victory to win the inaugural UEFA Women's Europa Cup title. As winners, they qualified for the league phase of the 2026–27 UEFA Women's Champions League, as the berth reserved for the Champions League title holders was not used and passed to the Europa Cup title holders.

== Route to the final ==
Note: In all results below, the score of the finalist is given first (H: home; A: away).

(Sweden) Hammarby IF				Round	(Sweden) BK Häcken			
Champions League
Opponent	Result			Qualifying rounds	Opponent	Agg.	1st leg	2nd leg
(Ukraine) Metalist 1925 Kharkiv	5–4 (H)			Second qualifying round (SF)	Bye			
(England) Manchester United	0–1 (H)			Second qualifying round (F)	Bye			
Eliminated				Third qualifying round	(Spain) Atlético Madrid	2–3	1–1 (H)	1–2 (a.e.t.) (A)
Europa Cup
Opponent	Agg.	1st leg	2nd leg	Qualifying rounds	Opponent	Agg.	1st leg	2nd leg
(Norway) Brann	5–2	4–1 (H)	1–1 (A)	Second qualifying round	(Poland) GKS Katowice	7–1	4–0 (H)	3–1 (A)
Opponent	Agg.	1st leg	2nd leg	Knockout phase	Opponent	Agg.	1st leg	2nd leg
(Netherlands) Ajax	6–2	3–1 (A)	3–1 (H)	Round of 16	(Italy) Inter Milan	1–0	1–0 (H)	0–0 (A)
(Portugal) Sporting CP	1–1 (5–4 p)	1–0 (A)	0–1 (a.e.t.) (H)	Quarter-finals	(Iceland) Breiðablik	11–1	7–0 (H)	4–1 (A)
(Czech Republic) Sparta Prague	5–2	3–2 (A)	2–0 (H)	Semi-finals	(Germany) Eintracht Frankfurt	3–1	3–0 (A)	0–1 (H)

== Matches ==
=== First leg ===
25 April 2026
15:00 UTC+2

Hammarby IF (Sweden)	0–1	(Sweden) BK Häcken
	Report	Schröder 22'

3Arena, Stockholm
Attendance: 7,597
Referee: Silvia Gasperotti (Italy)

Hammarby IF	BK Häcken

GK	28	(Germany) Melina Loeck
CB	18	(Sweden) Alice Carlsson (c)
CB	2	(Norway) Emilie Bragstad
CB	3	(Iceland) Guðrún Arnardóttir
RM	15	(Sweden) Sofia Reidy
CM	8	(Finland) Vilma Koivisto
CM	7	(Norway) Emilie Joramo
LM	17	(Sweden) Stina Lennartsson
RF	6	(Norway) Elin Sørum
CF	16	(Sweden) Svea Rehnberg	(substituted off) 81'
LF	25	(Sweden) Fanny Peterson	(substituted off) 59'
Substitutes:
GK	29	(Sweden) Cajsa Andersson
GK	30	(Sweden) Alice Olsson
DF	23	(Sweden) Athinna Persson Lundgren
DF	40	(Sweden) Sally Nylén
MF	10	(Sweden) Bea Sprung
MF	22	(Sweden) Hannah Sjödahl	(substituted on) 81'
MF	42	(Sweden) Stina Myrén
MF	43	(Sweden) Doris Petz
FW	20	(Norway) Vilde Hasund	(substituted on) 59'
Manager:
(Sweden) William Strömberg

GK	1	(Iceland) Fanney Inga Birkisdóttir
RB	4	(Sweden) Emma Östlund		(substituted off) 89'
CB	3	(Australia) Aivi Luik
CB	12	(Denmark) Stine Sandbech	(yellow card) 15'
LB	15	(Sweden) Alva Selerud		(substituted off) 73'
CM	24	(United States) Tabby Tindell
CM	7	(Denmark) Pernille Sanvig
AM	10	(Sweden) Anna Anvegård (c)		(substituted off) 89'
RF	19	(Sweden) Nesrin Akgün
CF	9	(Sweden) Felicia Schröder	(yellow card) 45+3'
LF	11	(Sweden) Monica Jusu Bah
Substitutes:
GK	29	(Sweden) Hanna Karlsson
DF	14	(Sweden) Tilde Karlsson
DF	18	(Sweden) Lisa Löwing		(substituted on) 89'
MF	5	(United States) Laney Matriano
MF	26	(Sweden) Nathalie Staaf
FW	17	(Malawi) Faith Chinzimu
FW	22	(Finland) Paulina Nyström		(substituted on) 89'
FW	27	(Iceland) Thelma Karen Pálmadóttir		(substituted on) 73'
Manager:
(Sweden) Elena Sadiku

Player of the Match:
Felicia Schröder (BK Häcken)

Assistant referees:
Giulia Tempestilli (Italy)
Emily Carney (England)
Fourth official:
Iuliana Demetrescu (Romania)
Video assistant referee:
Michael Fabbri (Italy)
Assistant video assistant referee:
Valerio Marini (Italy)

Match rules

- 90 minutes
- Maximum of twelve named substitutes
- Maximum of five substitutions
- Maximum of three substitution opportunities

=== Second leg ===
1 May 2026
16:00 UTC+2

BK Häcken (Sweden)	3–2	(Sweden) Hammarby IF
Schröder 6', 9', 53'	Report	Rehnberg 26'; Sørum 47'

Hisingen Arena, Gothenburg
Attendance: 5,566
Referee: Marta Huerta de Aza (Spain)

BK Häcken	Hammarby IF

GK	1	(Iceland) Fanney Inga Birkisdóttir
RB	4	(Sweden) Emma Östlund		(substituted off) 78'
CB	3	(Australia) Aivi Luik
CB	12	(Denmark) Stine Sandbech	(yellow card) 89'
LB	15	(Sweden) Alva Selerud		(substituted off) 46'
CM	7	(Denmark) Pernille Sanvig		(substituted off) 78'
CM	24	(United States) Tabby Tindell
AM	10	(Sweden) Anna Anvegård (c)		(substituted off) 86'
RW	19	(Sweden) Nesrin Akgün
LW	11	(Sweden) Monica Jusu Bah
CF	9	(Sweden) Felicia Schröder		(substituted off) 90'
Substitutes:
GK	29	(Sweden) Hanna Karlsson
DF	14	(Sweden) Tilde Karlsson		(substituted on) 90'
DF	18	(Sweden) Lisa Löwing		(substituted on) 78'
MF	5	(United States) Laney Matriano		(substituted on) 86'
MF	26	(Sweden) Nathalie Staaf
FW	17	(Malawi) Faith Chinzimu
FW	22	(Finland) Paulina Nyström		(substituted on) 78'
FW	27	(Iceland) Thelma Karen Pálmadóttir		(substituted on) 46'
Manager:
(Sweden) Elena Sadiku

GK	28	(Germany) Melina Loeck
CB	18	(Sweden) Alice Carlsson (c)
CB	2	(Norway) Emilie Bragstad	(yellow card) 39'
CB	3	(Iceland) Guðrún Arnardóttir		(substituted off) 15'
RM	15	(Sweden) Sofia Reidy
CM	8	(Finland) Vilma Koivisto		(substituted off) 85'
CM	7	(Norway) Emilie Joramo
LM	17	(Sweden) Stina Lennartsson
RF	6	(Norway) Elin Sørum	(yellow card) 55'
CF	16	(Sweden) Svea Rehnberg	(yellow card) 70'	(substituted off) 85'
LF	20	(Norway) Vilde Hasund
Substitutes:
GK	29	(Sweden) Cajsa Andersson
GK	30	(Sweden) Alice Olsson
DF	23	(Sweden) Athinna Persson Lundgren		(substituted on) 85'
DF	40	(Sweden) Sally Nylén
MF	10	(Sweden) Bea Sprung		(substituted on) 90+3'
MF	22	(Sweden) Hannah Sjödahl		(substituted on) 85'
MF	25	(Sweden) Fanny Peterson		(substituted on) 15' (substituted off) 90+3'
MF	27	(Sweden) Stella Maiquez
MF	42	(Sweden) Stina Myrén
MF	43	(Sweden) Doris Petz
Manager:
(Sweden) William Strömberg

Player of the Match:
Felicia Schröder (BK Häcken)

Assistant referees:
Guadalupe Porras Ayuso (Spain)
Eliana Fernández González (Spain)
Fourth official:
Olatz Rivera Olmedo (Spain)
Video assistant referee:
Guillermo Cuadra Fernández (Spain)
Assistant video assistant referee:
Judit Romano García (Spain)

Match rules

- 90 minutes
- 30 minutes of extra time if necessary
- Penalty shoot-out if scores still level
- Maximum of twelve named substitutes
- Maximum of five substitutions, with a sixth allowed in extra time
- Maximum of three substitution opportunities, with a fourth allowed in extra time

== See also ==
- 2026 UEFA Women's Champions League final
- 2026 UEFA Champions League final
- 2026 UEFA Europa League final
- 2026 UEFA Conference League final
- 2026 UEFA Super Cup
