= 2025–26 UEFA Women's Europa Cup knockout phase =

The 2025–26 UEFA Women's Europa Cup knockout phase began on 12 November 2025 with the first leg of the round of 16 and ended with the second leg of the final on 1 May 2026 to decide the winners of the 2025–26 UEFA Women's Europa Cup.

== Qualified teams ==
The knockout phase involved the 16 teams that qualified from the second qualifying round. The top eight teams formed four pairs while the remaining teams were placed in a single pot in the round of 16.

Entered as seeded teams
Pos	Team
1	(Sweden) BK Häcken
2	(Netherlands) Ajax
3	(Czech Republic) Sparta Prague
4	(Germany) Eintracht Frankfurt
5	(Belgium) Anderlecht
6	(Slovenia) Mura
7	(Scotland) Glasgow City
8	(Denmark) Fortuna Hjørring

Entered as unseeded teams
Pos	Team
9	(Iceland) Breiðablik
10	(Sweden) Hammarby IF
11	(Italy) Inter Milan
12	(Portugal) Sporting CP
13	(Netherlands) PSV Eindhoven
14	Austria Wien
15	(Denmark) Nordsjælland
16	(Switzerland) Young Boys

== Format ==
Each tie in the knockout phase was played over two legs, with each team playing one leg at home. The team that scored more goals on aggregate over the two legs advanced to the next round. If the aggregate score was level, then 30 minutes of extra time were played (the away goals rule was not applied). If the score was still level at the end of extra time, the winners were decided by a penalty shoot-out.

== Schedule ==
The schedule of the competition was as follows.

Schedule for 2025–26 UEFA Women's Europa Cup
Round	Draw date	First leg	Second leg
Round of 16	17 October 2025	12 November 2025	19–20 November 2025
Quarter-finals	17 October 2025	11 February 2026	18 February 2026
Semi-finals	17 October 2025	25 March 2026	2 April 2026
Final	17 October 2025	25 April 2026	1 May 2026

== Bracket ==
Round of 16
(Czech Republic) Sparta Prague	0	4	4
(Switzerland) Young Boys	3	0	3
(Belgium) Anderlecht	0	1	1
Austria Wien	1	2	3
(Scotland) Glasgow City	1	1	2
(Portugal) Sporting CP (a.e.t.)	1	3	4
(Netherlands) Ajax	1	1	2
(Sweden) Hammarby IF	3	3	6
(Netherlands) PSV Eindhoven	1	1	2
(Germany) Eintracht Frankfurt	2	3	5
(Denmark) Nordsjælland	1	4	5
(Slovenia) Mura	0	0	0
(Sweden) BK Häcken	1	0	1
(Italy) Inter Milan	0	0	0
(Iceland) Breiðablik (a.e.t.)	0	4	4
(Denmark) Fortuna Hjørring	1	2	3

Quarter-finals
(Czech Republic) Sparta Prague (a.e.t.)	0	3	3
Austria Wien	0	1	1
(Portugal) Sporting CP	0	1	1 (4)
(Sweden) Hammarby IF (p)	1	0	1 (5)
(Germany) Eintracht Frankfurt	4	3	7
(Denmark) Nordsjælland	0	2	2
(Sweden) BK Häcken	7	4	11
(Iceland) Breiðablik	0	1	1

Semi-finals
(Czech Republic) Sparta Prague	2	0	2
(Sweden) Hammarby IF	3	2	5
(Germany) Eintracht Frankfurt	0	1	1
(Sweden) BK Häcken	3	0	3

Final
(Sweden) Hammarby IF	0	2	2
(Sweden) BK Häcken	1	3	4

== Round of 16 ==
The draw for the round of 16 was held on 17 October 2025.

=== Seeding ===
Seeded				Unseeded
1/2	3/4	5/6	7/8	Unseeded
(Sweden) BK Häcken; (Netherlands) Ajax	(Czech Republic) Sparta Prague; (Germany) Eintracht Frankfurt	(Belgium) Anderlecht; (Slovenia) Mura	(Scotland) Glasgow City; (Denmark) Fortuna Hjørring	(Iceland) Breiðablik; (Sweden) Hammarby IF; (Italy) Inter Milan; (Portugal) Sporting CP; (Netherlands) PSV Eindhoven; Austria Wien; (Denmark) Nordsjælland; (Switzerland) Young Boys

=== Summary ===
The first legs were played on 12 November, and the second legs on 19 and 20 November 2025.

Round of 16
Team 1	Agg.	Team 2	1st leg	2nd leg
Ajax (Netherlands)	2–6	(Sweden) Hammarby IF	1–3	1–3
Glasgow City (Scotland)	2–4	(Portugal) Sporting CP	1–1	1–3 (a.e.t.)
Anderlecht (Belgium)	1–3	Austria Wien	0–1	1–2
Sparta Prague (Czech Republic)	4–3	(Switzerland) Young Boys	0–3	4–0
BK Häcken (Sweden)	1–0	(Italy) Inter Milan	1–0	0–0
Breiðablik (Iceland)	4–3	(Denmark) Fortuna Hjørring	0–1	4–2 (a.e.t.)
Nordsjælland (Denmark)	5–0	(Slovenia) Mura	1–0	4–0
PSV Eindhoven (Netherlands)	2–5	(Germany) Eintracht Frankfurt	1–2	1–3

=== Matches ===
12 November 2025
19:30

Ajax (Netherlands)	1–3	(Sweden) Hammarby IF
Van de Velde 74'	Report	Blakstad 19'; Jøsendal 52'; Wangerheim 71'

De Toekomst, Duivendrecht
Attendance: 711
Referee: Alexandra Collin (France)
20 November 2025
19:00

Hammarby IF (Sweden)	3–1	(Netherlands) Ajax
Miyagawa 60'; Holmberg 68'; Hasund 84'	Report	Smits 5'

3Arena, Stockholm
Attendance: 5,459
Referee: Ivana Martinčić (Croatia)

Hammarby IF won 6–2 on aggregate.

12 November 2025
20:35 (19:35 UTC+0)

Glasgow City (Scotland)	1–1	(Portugal) Sporting CP
Wróbel 20'	Report	Encarnação 75'

Petershill Park, Glasgow
Attendance: 560
Referee: Fabienne Michel (Germany)
19 November 2025
20:45 (19:45 UTC+0)

Sporting CP (Portugal)	3–1 (a.e.t.)	(Scotland) Glasgow City
Encarnação 73', 100'; Armengol 107'	Report	Kozlova 41'

Stadium Aurelio Pereira, Alcochete
Attendance: 228
Referee: Lina Lehtovaara (Finland)

Sporting CP won 4–2 on aggregate.

12 November 2025
19:00

Anderlecht (Belgium)	0–1	Austria Wien
	Report	Šišić 86'

Burg. Van De Wielestadion, Deinze
Attendance: 266
Referee: Kristina Georgieva (Bulgaria)
19 November 2025
19:30

Austria Wien	2–1	(Belgium) Anderlecht
Schiechtl 16'; Strode 54'	Report	Folkesson 79'

Franz Horr Stadium, Vienna
Attendance: 1,911
Referee: Jana Adámková (Czech Republic)

Austria Wien won 3–1 on aggregate.

12 November 2025
18:45

Sparta Prague (Czech Republic)	0–3	(Switzerland) Young Boys
	Report	Jelčić 52'; Jiménez 62'; Ess 84'

Stadion Letná, Prague
Attendance: 1,083
Referee: Ainara Acevedo (Spain)
19 November 2025
18:00

Young Boys (Switzerland)	0–4	(Czech Republic) Sparta Prague
	Report	Černá 15'; Khýrová 18', 36', 90+3'

Stadion Wankdorf, Bern
Attendance: 1,661
Referee: Aleksandra Česen (Slovenia)

Sparta Prague won 4–3 on aggregate.

12 November 2025
18:30

BK Häcken (Sweden)	1–0	(Italy) Inter Milan
Rúnarsdóttir 4' (o.g.)	Report

Hisingen Arena, Gothenburg
Attendance: 2,055
Referee: Kirsty Dowle (England)
19 November 2025
18:30

Inter Milan (Italy)	0–0	(Sweden) BK Häcken
	Report

Youth Development Training Center, Milan
Attendance: 374
Referee: Désirée Blanco (Switzerland)

BK Häcken won 1–0 on aggregate.

12 November 2025
19:00 (18:00 UTC+0)

Breiðablik (Iceland)	0–1	(Denmark) Fortuna Hjørring
	Report	Ogochuckwu 46'

Kópavogsvöllur, Kópavogur
Attendance: 474
Referee: Lotta Vuorio (Finland)
19 November 2025
18:00

Fortuna Hjørring (Denmark)	2–4 (a.e.t.)	(Iceland) Breiðablik
Nielsen 32'; Ogochuckwu 47'	Report	Gísladóttir 49'; Smith 65'; Hansen 90+7' (o.g.); Kristjánsdóttir 107'

Hjørring Stadium, Hjørring
Attendance: 617
Referee: Rasa Grigonė (Lithuania)

Breiðablik won 4–3 on aggregate.

12 November 2025
18:00

Nordsjælland (Denmark)	1–0	(Slovenia) Mura
Mott 29'	Report

Right to Dream Park, Farum
Attendance: 372
Referee: Lizzy van der Helm (Netherlands)
19 November 2025
18:00

Mura (Slovenia)	0–4	(Denmark) Nordsjælland
	Report	Larsen 36'; Marfo 45+4'; El Behery 72'; Engsig-Karup 86'

Fazanerija City Stadium, Murska Sobota
Attendance: 700
Referee: Caroline Lanssens (Belgium)

Nordsjælland won 5–0 on aggregate.

12 November 2025
19:00

PSV Eindhoven (Netherlands)	1–2	(Germany) Eintracht Frankfurt
Jacobs 21'	Report	Freigang 85'; Chiba 90'

De Herdgang, Eindhoven
Attendance: 980
Referee: Deborah Bianchi (Italy)
20 November 2025
18:30

Eintracht Frankfurt (Germany)	3–1	(Netherlands) PSV Eindhoven
Anyomi 20', 77'; Freigang 45'	Report	Rijsbergen 14'

Stadion am Brentanobad, Frankfurt
Attendance: 2,568
Referee: Catarina Campos (Portugal)

Eintracht Frankfurt won 5–2 on aggregate.

== Quarter-finals ==
The draw for the quarter-finals was held on 17 October 2025.

=== Summary ===
The first legs were played on 11 February, and the second legs on 18 February 2026.

Quarter-finals
Team 1	Agg.	Team 2	1st leg	2nd leg
Sporting CP (Portugal)	1–1 (4–5 p)	(Sweden) Hammarby IF	0–1	1–0 (a.e.t.)
Sparta Prague (Czech Republic)	3–1	Austria Wien	0–0	3–1 (a.e.t.)
BK Häcken (Sweden)	11–1	(Iceland) Breiðablik	7–0	4–1
Eintracht Frankfurt (Germany)	7–2	(Denmark) Nordsjælland	4–0	3–2

=== Matches ===
11 February 2026
20:45 (19:45 UTC+0)

Sporting CP (Portugal)	0–1	(Sweden) Hammarby IF
	Report	Joramo 69'

Stadium Aurelio Pereira, Alcochete
Attendance: 371
Referee: Michalina Diakow (Poland)
18 February 2026
19:00

Hammarby IF (Sweden)	0–1 (a.e.t.)	(Portugal) Sporting CP
	Report	Encarnação 70'
Penalties
Hasund (penalty scored); Koivisto (penalty scored); Bragstad (penalty scored); Persson (penalty scored); Janzen (penalty scored)	5–4	(penalty scored) Raphino; (penalty scored) Arques; (penalty scored) Hernandez Gray; (penalty missed) Cherry; (penalty scored) Cancelinha

3Arena, Stockholm
Attendance: 6,353
Referee: Maria Sole Ferrieri Caputi (Italy)

1–1 on aggregate; Hammarby IF won 5–4 on penalties.

11 February 2026
12:00

Sparta Prague (Czech Republic)	0–0	Austria Wien
	Report

Stadion Letná, Prague
Attendance: 4,879
Referee: Olatz Rivera Olmedo (Spain)
18 February 2026
19:30

Austria Wien	1–3 (a.e.t.)	(Czech Republic) Sparta Prague
Cordes 72'	Report	Stárová 70'; Bergford 98'; Khýrová 105+1'

Franz Horr Stadium, Vienna
Attendance: 1,882
Referee: Catarina Campos (Portugal)

Sparta Prague won 3–1 on aggregate.

11 February 2026
18:30

BK Häcken (Sweden)	7–0	(Iceland) Breiðablik
Sampaio 25', 78'; Schröder 30', 35'; Jusu Bah 33'; Pálmadóttir 40'; Nyström 68'	Report

Hisingen Arena, Gothenburg
Attendance: 1,274
Referee: Lina Lehtovaara (Finland)
18 February 2026
19:00 (18:00 UTC+0)

Breiðablik (Iceland)	1–4	(Sweden) BK Häcken
Viðarsdóttir 57'	Report	Nyström 2'; Östlund 18'; Selerud 61'; Jusu Bah 65'

Kópavogsvöllur, Kópavogur
Attendance: 411
Referee: Marta Huerta de Aza (Spain)

BK Häcken won 11–1 on aggregate.

11 February 2026
18:30

Eintracht Frankfurt (Germany)	4–0	(Denmark) Nordsjælland
Anyomi 14'; Blomqvist 36', 58'; Memeti 48'	Report

Stadion am Brentanobad, Frankfurt
Attendance: 2,600
Referee: Désirée Blanco (Switzerland)
18 February 2026
18:00

Nordsjælland (Denmark)	2–3	(Germany) Eintracht Frankfurt
Marfo 30'; Walter 66'	Report	Chiba 6'; Reuteler 22'; Raso 52'

Right to Dream Park, Farum
Attendance: 617
Referee: Emanuela Rusta (Albania)

Eintracht Frankfurt won 7–2 on aggregate.

== Semi-finals ==
The draw for the semi-finals was held on 17 October 2025.

=== Summary ===
The first legs were played on 25 March, and the second legs on 2 April 2026.

Semi-finals
Team 1	Agg.	Team 2	1st leg	2nd leg
Sparta Prague (Czech Republic)	2–5	(Sweden) Hammarby IF	2–3	0–2
Eintracht Frankfurt (Germany)	1–3	(Sweden) BK Häcken	0–3	1–0

=== Matches ===
25 March 2026
18:00

Sparta Prague (Czech Republic)	2–3	(Sweden) Hammarby IF
Stárová 60'; Khýrová 83'	Report	Sørum 45+1'; Reidy 86'; Peterson 90+2'

Stadion Letná, Prague
Attendance: 1,859
Referee: Eleni Antoniou (Greece)
2 April 2026
19:00

Hammarby IF (Sweden)	2–0	(Czech Republic) Sparta Prague
Peterson 33'; Hasund 62'	Report

3Arena, Stockholm
Attendance: 5,260
Referee: Silvia Gasperotti (Italy)

Hammarby IF won 5–2 on aggregate.

25 March 2026
18:30

Eintracht Frankfurt (Germany)	0–3	(Sweden) BK Häcken
	Report	Selerud 16'; Schröder 70', 84'

Stadion am Brentanobad, Frankfurt
Attendance: 4,100
Referee: Catarina Campos (Portugal)
2 April 2026
18:30

BK Häcken (Sweden)	0–1	(Germany) Eintracht Frankfurt
	Report	Anyomi 31'

Hisingen Arena, Gothenburg
Attendance: 2,025
Referee: Ivana Martinčić (Croatia)

BK Häcken won 3–1 on aggregate.

== Final ==
The draw for the final was held on 17 October 2025.

=== Summary ===
The first leg was played on 25 April, and the second leg on 1 May 2026.

Final
Team 1	Agg.	Team 2	1st leg	2nd leg
Hammarby IF (Sweden)	2–4	(Sweden) BK Häcken	0–1	2–3

=== Matches ===
25 April 2026
15:00

Hammarby IF (Sweden)	0–1	(Sweden) BK Häcken
	Report	Schröder 22'

3Arena, Stockholm
Attendance: 7,597
Referee: Silvia Gasperotti (Italy)
1 May 2026
16:00

BK Häcken (Sweden)	3–2	(Sweden) Hammarby IF
Schröder 6', 9', 53'	Report	Rehnberg 26'; Sørum 47'

Hisingen Arena, Gothenburg
Attendance: 5,566
Referee: Marta Huerta de Aza (Spain)

BK Häcken won 4–2 on aggregate.
