= Helena Sampaio =

Helena Sampaio may refer to:

- Helena Sampaio (runner)
- Helena Sampaio (footballer)
