= Jóhanna Fossdalsá =

Danish footballer (born 2005)

Personal information
- Full name: Jóhanna Fossdalsá Sørensen
- Date of birth: 28 November 2005 (age 20)
- Place of birth: Hoyvík, Faroe Islands
- Height: 1.70 m (5 ft 7 in)
- Position: Midfielder

Team information
- Current team: BK Häcken
- Number: 21

Youth career
- Havnar Bóltfelag
- Vildbjerg SF
- Nordsjælland

Senior career*
Years	Team	Apps	(Gls)
2021–2023	Nordsjælland	33	(9)
2023–	BK Häcken	31	(5)

International career^{‡}
2020–2021	Denmark U16	6	(1)
2021–2022	Denmark U17	11	(3)
2022–2023	Denmark U19	18	(7)
2024–	Denmark	5	(0)
- * Club domestic league appearances and goals as of 9 November 2024 ‡ National team caps and goals as of 30 May 2025

Jóhanna Fossdalsá Sørensen (born 28 November 2005) is a Danish professional footballer who plays as a midfielder for Damallsvenskan club BK Häcken and the Denmark national team.

== Club career ==
On 4 July 2023, Swedish club BK Häcken announced the signing of Fossdalsá on a three-year contract until the summer of 2026.

== International career ==
Fossdalsá has represented Denmark at youth level. She was also eligible to play for the Faroe Islands.

In February 2024, Fossdalsá received her first call-up to the Denmark national team. She made her international debut on 28 February 2024 in a 1–1 draw against Austria.

== Personal life ==
Fossdalsá's older brother Heini Sørensen is also a professional footballer. Fossdalsá's family moved from the Faroe Islands to Denmark in 2018 when Sørensen joined Midtjylland.

== Career statistics ==
=== International ===
As of match played 30 May 2025

Appearances and goals by national team and year
National team	Year	Apps	Goals
Denmark	2024	3	0
Denmark	2025	2	0
Total		5	0

== Honors ==
BK Häcken

- Damallsvenskan: 2025
- UEFA Women's Europa Cup: 2025–26
