= Sofia Reidy =

Swedish footballer (born 2004)

Personal information
- Full name: Sofia Ann Elin Reidy
- Date of birth: 15 March 2004 (age 22)
- Place of birth: Uppsala, Sweden
- Height: 1.73 m (5 ft 8 in)
- Position: Defender

Team information
- Current team: Hammarby
- Number: 15

Youth career
- Stenkullen GoIK
- Jonsereds IF
- 2019–2020: Göteborgs DFF

Senior career*
Years	Team	Apps	(Gls)
2021–2023	Jitex BK	70	(3)
2024–2025	Kristianstad	36	(0)
2025–	Hammarby	35	(3)

International career^{‡}
	Sweden U17	2	(0)
2022–2023	Sweden U19	13	(1)
2023–	Sweden U23	18	(1)
2026–	Sweden	1	(0)
- * Club domestic league appearances and goals as of 22 November 2026 ‡ National team caps and goals as of 6 June 2026

Sofia Ann Elin Reidy (born 15 March 2004) is a Swedish professional footballer who plays as a defender for Damallsvenskan club Hammarby and the Sweden national team. She has previously played for Jitex BK and Kristianstads DFF.

== Early life ==
Born in Uppsala, Reidy grew up in the city of Gothenburg. Her older sister, Ella, also plays football professionally, while her father, Tom, is BK Häcken FF's fitness trainer. Reidy started playing football with Stenkullen GoIK and Jonsereds IF, gaining Elitettan experience at the latter club. In 2019, she moved to Göteborgs DFF. Reidy also played badminton throughout her youth before choosing to focus entirely on football after graduating from school. In 2018, she won the Swedish under-15 badminton championship title alongside her sister.

== Club career ==
In 2021, Reidy joined Jitex BK, where she played in the Swedish second division. It was the final club in which she played alongside her sister, Ella. Reidy departed from Jitex ahead of the 2024 Elitettan season.

Damallsvenskan club Kristianstads DFF were next to sign Reidy. In her first season playing top-flight football, Reidy became a consistent starter. She made 36 league appearances in one-and-a-half seasons with Kristianstad.

On 23 July 2025, Reidy made a midseason transfer to Hammarby, leaving Kristianstad with six months remaining on her contract. She signed a long-term contract with Hammarby, lasting through the 2029 season, feeling the time was right for another step forward in her development. She spent much of her first season on the bench, behind Smilla Holmberg on the team's depth chart. The following year, Reidy broke into the starting lineup, often being weaponized at full-back. She helped Hammarby reach the 2026 UEFA Women's Europa Cup final, where they were defeated by fellow Swedish side BK Häcken, and the 2026 Svenska Cupen final, where they won against the same opponent 1 - 0 in extra time. On 31 May 2026, she scored both goals, one of which was the 81st-minute game-winner, in a 2–1 victory over Vittsjö.

== International career ==
Reidy has made numerous appearances for the Sweden youth national teams, starting at the under-17 level. In 2022, she was named to the 2022 UEFA Women's Under-19 Championship squad after making important contributions in the U19's qualifying campaign, including by scoring the tying goal in a comeback win over Iceland. In 2023, she began to play for the under-23s.

In February 2026, Tony Gustavsson gave Reidy her first Sweden senior team call-up, ahead of 2027 FIFA Women's World Cup qualification matches against Italy and Serbia. On 14 April 2026, Reidy made her senior international debut, earning the start in a 2–1 qualifier defeat to Denmark.
