= Elena Sadiku =

Swedish football player and coach (born 1993)

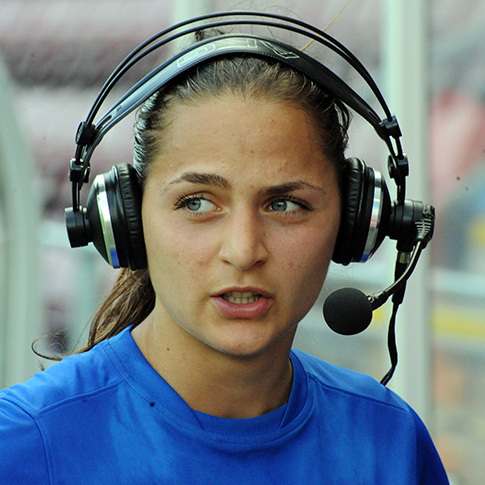
- Sadiku with Eskilstuna United in 2014

Personal information
- Date of birth: 6 November 1993 (age 33)
- Place of birth: Bocholt, Germany
- Height: 1.70 m (5 ft 7 in)

Team information
- Current team: BK Häcken FF (head coach)

Youth career
- LdB Malmö

Senior career*
Years	Team	Apps	(Gls)
2009–2011	LdB Malmö	13	(1)
2012–2013	Kristianstad	28	(1)
2014–2016	Eskilstuna United	16	(5)
2017	Hammarby	6	(1)

International career
2011–2012	Sweden U19	14	(2)

Managerial career
- 2018–2019: Beijing BG Phoenix (assistant)
- 2019–2021: Rosengård (assistant)
- 2021: Fortuna Hjørring
- 2021–2022: Eskilstuna United
- 2023–2024: Everton U21
- 2024–2025: Celtic Women
- 2025–: BK Häcken FF
- * Club domestic league appearances and goals

Elena Sadiku (born 6 November 1993) is a Swedish football manager and former player who is the head coach of Damallsvenskan club BK Häcken.

== Playing career ==
Sadiku began her career at LdB Malmö (now FC Rosengård). Originally playing as a striker, she transitioned into a box-to-box midfielder. By 2011, she played for the Sweden women's national under-19 football team, earning 14 caps and scoring 2 goals. She continued her club career in the Damallsvenskan, transferring to Kristianstads DFF in 2012 and subsequently to Eskilstuna United in 2014.

In July 2014, Sadiku sustained a severe knee injury that involved the tearing of her ACL, MCL, LCL, and meniscus, which sidelined her for a year. In July 2015, she returned to play and scored a hat-trick in Eskilstuna’s 5–1 victory against AIK, but a few days later, she tore the same ACL and LCL again during training. Following these injuries, Sadiku suffered from depression during her prolonged rehabilitation.

In 2017, Sadiku joined Hammarby IF. She played her final game in a match against Djurgårdens IF, where she tore her ACL for the third time. The injury was compounded by a severe infection following a keyhole surgery, requiring seven operations in two weeks and presenting a risk of leg amputation. This life-threatening complication led to her decision to retire from playing at age 24.

== Coaching career ==
Following her retirement as a player, Sadiku took up a coaching position at Hammarby IF’s Academy. In February 2018, she was invited by Kim Björkegren to join him at Chinese Women's Super League (CWSL) club Beijing BG Phoenix as an assistant coach and fitness trainer.

After a season in China, she returned to FC Rosengård, where she became head coach of the U-19 academy. In July 2020, she became joint head coach of FC Rosengård 1917 (the club's "B" team) alongside Renée Slegers. The pair led the team to the 2020 Division 2 Södra Götaland title, securing promotion to Division 1. Sadiku then stepped up into an assistant coach role for Rosengård’s first-team, where she worked under Jonas Eidevall.

In January 2021, Sadiku was appointed as head coach of Danish side Fortuna Hjørring. In the 2020/21 season, she led the club to the quarter-finals of the UEFA Women's Champions League (UWCL). Ten months later, Sadiku returned to Eskilstuna United where she became joint head coach alongside Fredrik Benhardsson. On 7 April 2023, Sadiku was appointed as Women's Academy Head Coach at Everton.

On 12 January 2024, Sadiku became the first female head coach of Celtic FC Women. Under her leadership, Celtic won their first Scottish Women's Premier League (SWPL1) title on goal difference over rivals Rangers. As a result, the club earned a spot in the 2024/25 Champions League qualifiers, where they became the first Scottish side to reach the group stages.

On 22 December 2025, Sadiku was appointed as head coach of Damallsvenskan side BK Häcken FF. On 1 May 2026, she guided the club to victory in the inaugural UEFA Women's Europa Cup, after beating Hammarby IF in the two-legged final 4–2 on aggregate.

== Personal life ==
Sadiku was born on 6 November 1993 in the north-west German city of Bocholt to Kosovor-Albanian parents, before spending six months with her family in Kosovo during the Kosovo War.. The experience of fleeing the war and living as refugees led to their struggles with post-traumatic stress.

At the age of seven, her family relocated to Sweden, where she began playing football in the garden with her brother. The sport turned into a passion for Sadiku and helped her find a sense of safety during her childhood.

== Honours ==
Celtic Women

- Scottish Women's Premier League: 2023–24

BK Häcken FF

- UEFA Women's Europa Cup: 2025–26
