= Fanney Birkisdóttir =

Icelandic footballer (born 2005)

- Fanney with Häcken in 2025

Personal information
- Date of birth: 17 March 2005 (age 21)
- Position: Goalkeeper

Team information
- Current team: Vålerenga

Senior career*
Years	Team	Apps	(Gls)
2020–2022	Valur	1	(0)
2022	FH	1	(0)
2022–2024	Valur	35	(0)
2024–2026	Häcken	6	(0)
2026–	Vålerenga	0	(0)

International career^{‡}
2021–2022	Iceland U17		
2022–2024	Iceland U19	3	(0)
2021–	Iceland	9	(0)
- * Club domestic league appearances and goals as of 1 May 2026 ‡ National team caps and goals as of 15 October 2026

Fanney Inga Birkisdóttir (born 17 March 2005) is an Icelandic professional footballer who plays as a goalkeeper for Toppserien club Vålerenga and the Iceland national team.

== Career ==
After joining Häcken, it was reported that Fanney was bought for a record amount in Icelandic football.

== International career ==
Fanney was part of Iceland's 23-player squad for the UEFA Women's Euro 2025 in Switzerland.

== Honors ==
BK Häcken

- Damallsvenskan: 2025
- UEFA Women's Europa Cup: 2025–26
