= Aivi Luik =

Australian soccer player (born 1985)

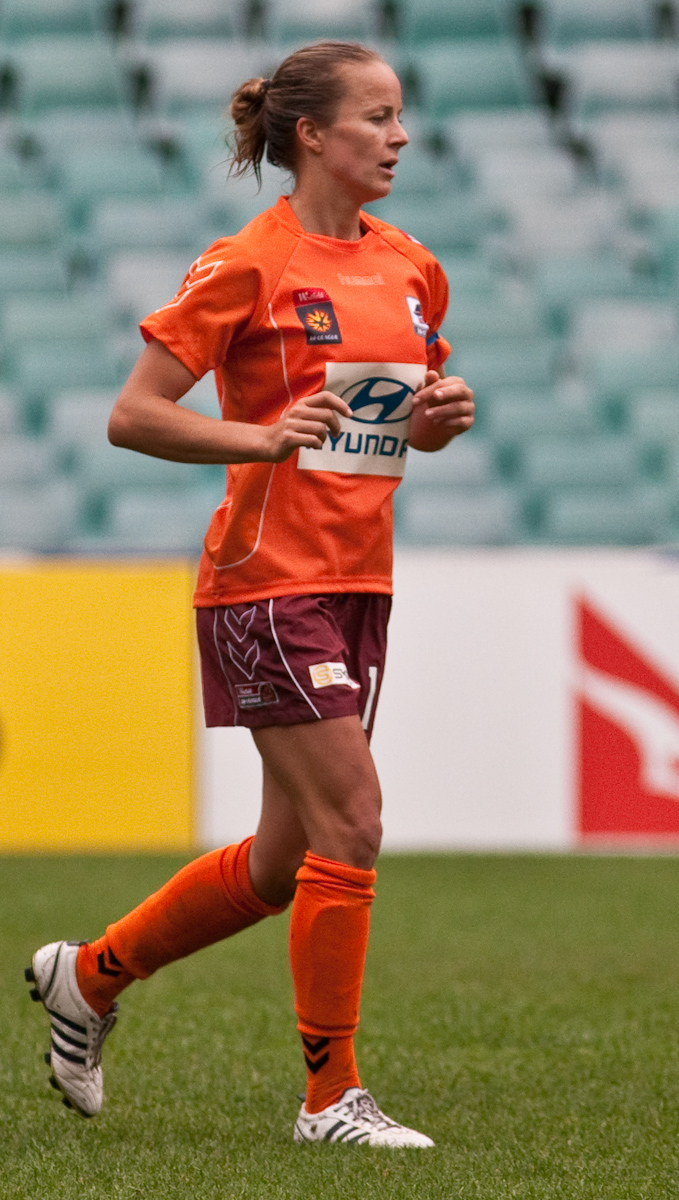
- Luik with Brisbane Roar in 2009

Personal information
- Full name: Aivi Belinda Kerstin Luik
- Date of birth: 18 March 1985 (age 41)
- Place of birth: Perth, Western Australia, Australia
- Height: 1.66 m (5 ft 5 in)
- Position: Defender

Team information
- Current team: Häcken
- Number: 3

College career
Years	Team	Apps	(Gls)
2003–2004	Brescia University		
2005–2006	Nevada Wolf Pack	42	(9)

Senior career*
Years	Team	Apps	(Gls)
2005–2009	F.C. Indiana	84	(11)
2009–2012	Brisbane Roar	29	(1)
2010	Ottawa Fury		
2011–2012	Brøndby IF		
2012–2014	Perth Glory	10	(2)
2015	Fylkir	8	(3)
2015–2020	Melbourne City	49	(6)
2016–2017	Notts County	14	(0)
2017	Vålerenga	21	(3)
2018	Kalmar	9	(1)
2018–2019	Levante	26	(0)
2019	Avaldsnes	11	(0)
2019–2020	Melbourne City	12	(1)
2020–2021	Sevilla	30	(0)
2021–2022	Pomigliano	14	(1)
2022–	Häcken	50	(1)

International career^{‡}
2010–	Australia	45	(1)
- * Club domestic league appearances and goals as of 1 May 2026 ‡ National team caps and goals as of 17 December 2024

Aivi Belinda Kerstin Luik (Estonian: [ˈɑi.vi ˈluik] EYE-vee LOO-ick; born 18 March 1985) is an Australian professional soccer player who plays as a midfielder for Damallsvenskan club BK Häcken. She represented the Australia national team, making over 30 appearances.

Having won the inaugural UEFA Women's Europa Cup (UWEC) with BK Häcken in the 2025–26 season aged 41, Luik is the oldest player to have ever won a European final, having played every single minute of the two-legged final (which Häcken won 4–2 on aggregate over Hammarby IF).

== Early life and collegiate career ==
Luik was born in Perth to an Estonian mother and a Swedish mother. She moved to the Gold Coast at a young age where she played junior football for Palm Beach. Following high school graduation, she enrolled at Brescia University in Kentucky before transferring to the University of Nevada, Reno where she was a two-year starter for the Nevada Wolf Pack from 2005 to 2006. During her senior year, she captained the squad and scored the game-winning penalty kick to win the Western Athletic Conference (WAC) and lift the NCAA College Cup for the first time.

Luik ended her collegiate career at Nevada having made 41 starts in 42 games. She scored nine goals, served seven assists for 25 points. As of 2010, she ranked second in the history of the team for game-winning goals and seventh for goals scored. She earned All-WAC second team honors in 2005 and was named Nevada's most valuable player in 2006.

Luik played for FC Indiana and Ottawa Fury in the USL W-League.

== Club career ==
=== Brisbane Roar, 2009–2011 ===
In 2009, Luik joined Brisbane Roar in the Australian W-League. During the 2009 season, she started in all eleven games for Brisbane. Brisbane finished in third place and advanced to the semi-finals where they defeated Central Coast Mariners 1–0. Brisbane lost the 2009 W-League Grand Final to Sydney FC.

=== Brøndby IF, 2011–12 ===
Luik moved to Europe where she played for Brøndby IF in Denmark's Elitedivisionen during the 2011–12 season. Brøndby finished in first place with a 17–0–1 record.

=== Melbourne City FC, 2015–2020 ===
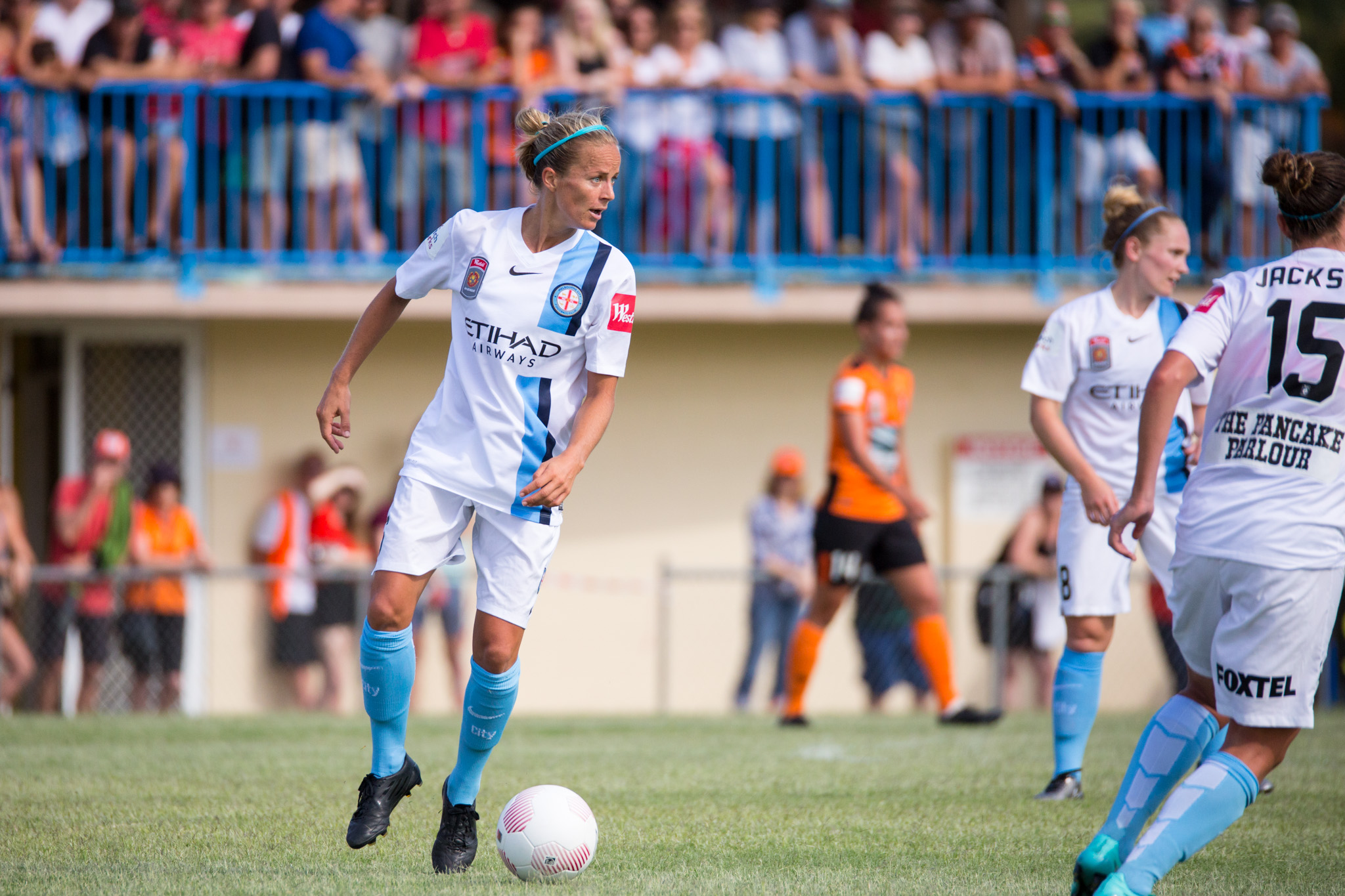
Luik during a match against Brisbane Roar, December 2015

In 2015, Luik joined Melbourne City FC for their inaugural season in the W-League. During a match against the Melbourne Victory, she converted a free-kick to score the game-winning goal. City won all 12 of its regular season games and finished in first place during the regular season with Luik starting in the midfielder in all games. After advancing to the semi-finals, Melbourne City won the 2016 W-League Grand Final. She was named W-League Player of the Year by the club.

After re-signing with Melbourne City for the 2016–17 season, Luik started in the midfield in 13 of the 14 matches she played, including the semifinal and Grand Final. Melbourne finished in fourth place during the regular season with a 6–4–2 record and advanced to the semi-finals. After defeating Brisbane Roar in penalty kicks, Melbourne City advanced and won the 2017 W-League Grand Final for the second consecutive year.

=== Notts County, 2016 ===
In March 2016, Luik signed with English side Notts County F.C. on a two-year deal. During the 2016 FA WSL season, she made 14 appearances including 9 starts. Notts County finished in sixth place with a 4–8–4 record.

=== Pomigliano ===
In August 2021 Luik signed for newly-promoted Italian Serie A club Pomigliano.

== International career ==
Luik made her debut for the Australian national team in February 2010 in a friendly match against New Zealand. A year later she was part of the squad for the 2010 AFC Women's Asian Cup, which Australia won. In the summer of 2021, she was part of Australia's squad for the delayed 2020 Olympics and made three appearances during the tournament. Shortly after the Olympic Games, in August 2021, she announced her retirement from the national team, having made over 30 appearances. Five months later, Luik returned from retirement and was named in Australia's 2022 AFC Women's Asian Cup squad.

Luik was selected for the Australian Matildas football team which qualified for the Tokyo 2020 Olympics. The Matildas advanced to the quarter-finals with one victory and a draw in the group play. In the quarter-finals they beat Great Britain 4-3 after extra time. However, they lost 1–0 to Sweden in the semi-final and were then beaten 4–3 in the bronze medal playoff by USA.

Luik missed Australia's second match of the 2023 FIFA Women's World Cup due to concussion.

== See also ==
- Australia at the 2020 Summer Olympics

== International goals ==
No.	Date	Venue	Opponent	Score	Result	Competition
1.	21 January 2022	Mumbai Football Arena, Mumbai, India	Indonesia	17–0	18–0	2022 AFC Women's Asian Cup

== Honours ==
Brisbane Roar

- W-League Champion: 2010–11

Brøndby IF

- Elitedivisionen: 2011–12

Melbourne City

- W-League Premier: 2015–16, 2019–20
- W-League Champion: 2015–16, 2016–17, 2017–18, 2019–20

Vålerenga

- Norwegian Women's Cup: 2017

BK Häcken

- Damallsvenskan: 2025
- UEFA Women's Europa Cup: 2025–26

Australia

- AFC Women's Asian Cup: 2010
- AFC Olympic Qualifying Tournament: 2016
