= Anna Anvegård =

Swedish footballer (born 1997)

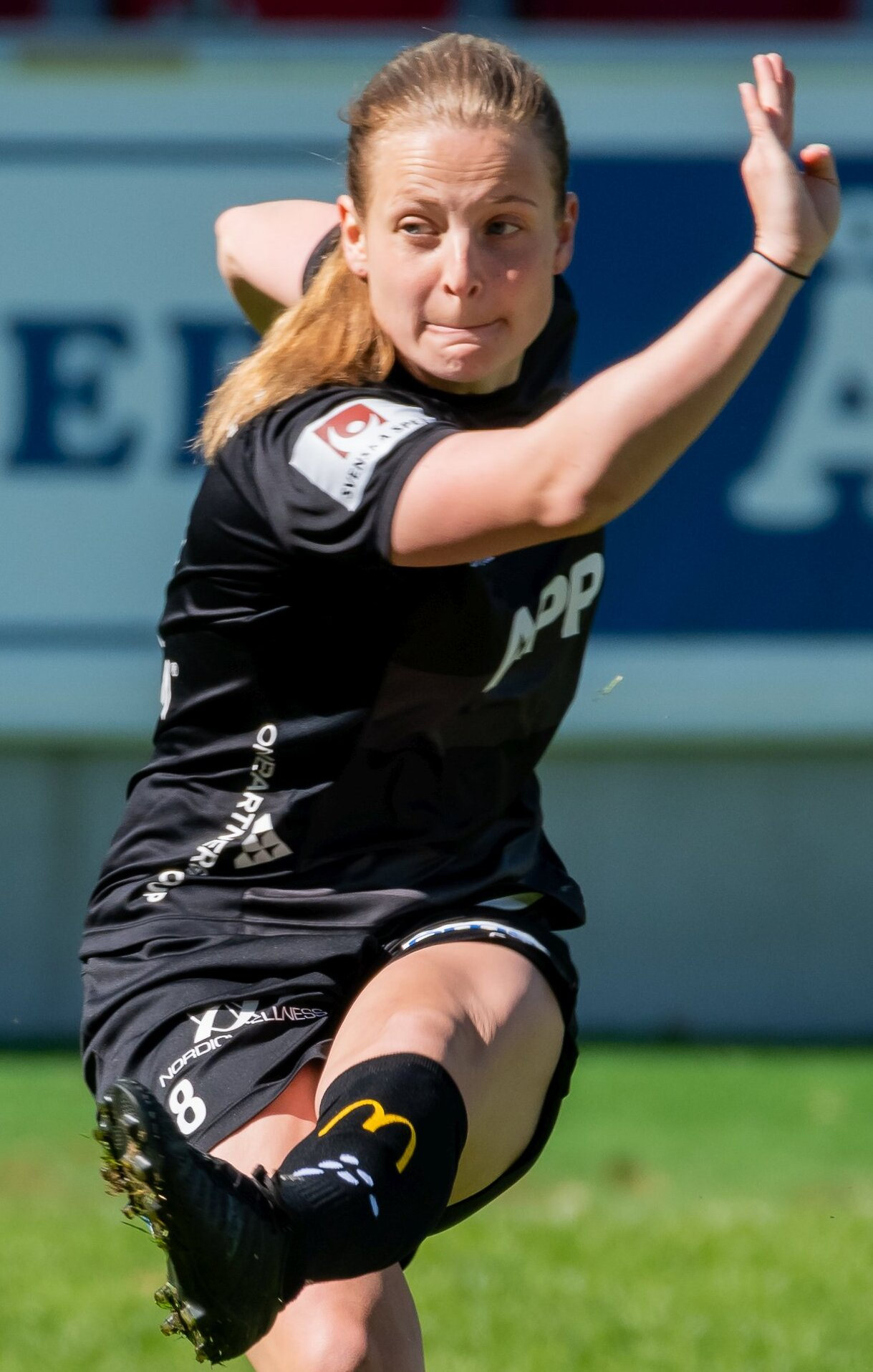
- Anvegård in 2018

Personal information
- Full name: Anna Elin Astrid Anvegård
- Date of birth: 10 May 1997 (age 29)
- Place of birth: Bredaryd, Sweden
- Height: 1.67 m (5 ft 6 in)
- Position: Forward

Team information
- Current team: BK Häcken
- Number: 10

Youth career
- Bredaryd Lanna IK
- BIK/FIF/LGoIF
- RÅs LB

Senior career*
| Years | Team | Apps | (Gls) |
| 2015–2019 | Växjö DFF | 101 | (109) |
| 2019–2021 | FC Rosengård | 36 | (26) |
| 2021–2022 | Everton | 14 | (4) |
| 2022– | BK Häcken | 66 | (29) |

International career^{‡}
| 2013–2014 | Sweden U17 | 14 | (3) |
| 2015–2016 | Sweden U19 | 13 | (4) |
| 2016–2018 | Sweden U23 | 8 | (3) |
| 2018– | Sweden | 39 | (11) |
Medal record
Representing Sweden
Olympic Games
| Silver medal – second place | 2020 Tokyo |
FIFA Women's World Cup
| Third place | 2019 France |
- * Club domestic league appearances and goals as of 6 April 2026 ‡ National team caps and goals as of 14 October 2026

Anna Elin Astrid Anvegård (born 10 May 1997) is a Swedish professional footballer who plays as a forward for BK Häcken in the Damallsvenskan and the Sweden national team.

== Club career ==
=== Växjö DFF ===
Anvegård made her senior debut with Växjö in the third-tier Division 1 in 2015. She finished as top scorer with 27 goals in 17 appearances as the team was promoted to the Elitettan. The following two Elitettan seasons she once again finished as top scorer as Växjö finished in third-place in 2016 before winning the league title in 2017. In her first season in the Damallsvenskan, Anvegård scored a joint-second most 14 goals behind only Anja Mittag as Växjö finished in seventh-place. Her form earned her a call-up to the national team, the first in Växjö's history. At the Fotbollsgalan 2018 awards she was nominated for forward of the year and breakthrough player of the year, winning the latter.

=== FC Rosengård ===
Anvegård's impressive goalscoring records made her a transfer target for several bigger clubs, both in Sweden and abroad. In August 2019, she completed a transfer to Damallsvenskan leaders FC Rosengård. During the 2019 season she finished as top scorer with a combined 14 goals for Växjö and Rosengård as Rosengård won a record 11th Damallsvenskan title. As well as the golden boot, Anvegård was named 2019 Most Valuable Player at the end of season awards. She clinched her fifth career golden boot and second at first division level in 2020 with 16 goals as Rosengård finished in second-place behind Kopparbergs/Göteborg FC. In December 2020 she made her Champions League debut, scoring three goals across two legs against Georgian team Lanchkhuti during the round of 32. She was also named to The 100 Best Female Footballers In The World for the first time in 2020, ranking at 85. Having not yet scored during the 2021 season, Anvegård netted in a 5–0 win over her former club Växjö DFF on 8 July 2021, her final appearance before departing.

=== Everton ===
On 10 July 2021, Anvegård signed a two-year contract with Everton of the English Women's Super League. In her debut season she made 19 appearances in all competitions and finished as the team's top goalscorer in both the league (four goals) and in total (seven goals).

=== BK Häcken ===
After one season in England, Anvegård completed a free transfer back to Sweden with BK Häcken on 20 July 2022.

== International career ==
=== Youth ===
Anvegård was part of the Sweden under-17 squad during 2014 UEFA Women's Under-17 Championship qualification. She scored once in an 8–0 win over Israel as Sweden progressed to the elite round before missing out on qualification, finishing second in the group to France. She scored three goals for the under-19 team during 2016 UEFA Women's Under-19 Championship qualification as Sweden once again finished as runners-up during the elite round. In November 2016, Anvegård was called-up for the FIFA U20 World Cup. She scored one goal in a 6–0 over host nation Papua New Guinea as Sweden were eliminated at the group stage behind North Korea and Brazil.

=== Senior ===
In June 2018, Anvegård was called up to the senior national team and made her debut on 7 June 2018 in a 4–0 friendly win against Croatia, entering as a 71st-minute substitute for Jonna Andersson. She was praised by coach Peter Gerhardsson for her striking instincts: "She has the classic nose for the target and knows where it is." She scored her first senior international goal on the occasion of her fourth cap, in a 2–0 friendly victory over England on 11 November 2018.

In May 2019, Anvegård was named as part of the Swedish squad for the 2019 FIFA Women's World Cup in France. She made three appearances, making her World Cup debut as a 65th-minute substitute in a 2–0 opening group stage win over Chile. She started the next game, a 5–1 win over Thailand. Sweden finished third, losing the semi-final to Netherlands in extra-time before beating England in the bronze medal match.

On 8 November 2019, Anvegård scored her first international brace in a 3–2 friendly loss to reigning world champions United States. In her next appearance she scored a hat-trick against Hungary during UEFA Women's Euro 2022 qualifying.

In July 2021, Anvegård was named to the squad for the delayed 2020 Summer Olympics in Tokyo. She made her Olympic debut on 27 July in the final group game, scoring in a 2–0 win over New Zealand.

== Career statistics ==
=== Club summary ===
As of 8 May 2022.

| Club | Season | League | | | National Cup (Note: Svenska Cupen and FA Cup) | | League Cup (Note: FA Women's League Cup) | | Continental (Note: Champions League) | | Total | |
| Club | Season | Division | Apps | Goals | Apps | Goals | Apps | Goals | Apps | Goals | Apps | Goals |
|---|---|---|---|---|---|---|---|---|---|---|---|---|
| Växjö DFF | 2015 | Division 1 | 17 | 27 | 2 | 1 | — | | — | | 19 | 28 |
| Växjö DFF | 2016 | Elitettan | 26 | 30 | 2 | 0 | — | | — | | 28 | 30 |
| Växjö DFF | 2017 | Elitettan | 25 | 33 | 2 | 5 | — | | — | | 27 | 38 |
| Växjö DFF | 2018 | Damallsvenskan | 21 | 14 | 3 | 1 | — | | — | | 24 | 15 |
| Växjö DFF | 2019 | Damallsvenskan | 12 | 5 | 0 | 0 | — | | — | | 12 | 5 |
| Växjö DFF | Total | | 101 | 109 | 9 | 7 | 0 | 0 | 0 | 0 | 110 | 116 |
| FC Rosengård | 2019 | Damallsvenskan | 9 | 9 | 1 | 1 | — | | — | | 10 | 10 |
| FC Rosengård | 2020 | Damallsvenskan | 21 | 16 | 0 | 0 | — | | 2 | 3 | 23 | 19 |
| FC Rosengård | 2021 | Damallsvenskan | 6 | 1 | 0 | 0 | — | | 1 | 0 | 7 | 1 |
| FC Rosengård | Total | | 36 | 26 | 1 | 1 | 0 | 0 | 3 | 3 | 40 | 30 |
| Everton | 2021–22 | FA WSL | 14 | 4 | 2 | 2 | 3 | 1 | — | | 19 | 7 |
| Career total | | | 151 | 139 | 12 | 10 | 3 | 1 | 3 | 3 | 169 | 153 |

=== International ===
Statistics accurate as of match played 23 February 2022.

Sweden
| Year | Apps | Goals |
|---|---|---|
| 2018 | 4 | 1 |
| 2019 | 10 | 2 |
| 2020 | 5 | 5 |
| 2021 | 4 | 1 |
| 2022 | 2 | 0 |
| Total | 25 | 9 |

=== International goals ===
As of match played 27 July 2021. Sweden score listed first, score column indicates score after each Anvegård goal.

| No. | Date | Cap | Venue | Opponent | Score | Result | Competition |
|---|---|---|---|---|---|---|---|
| 1 | 11 November 2018 | 4 | New York Stadium, Rotherham, England | England | 2–0 | 2–0 | Friendly |
| 2 | 8 November 2019 | 10 | Mapfre Stadium, Columbus, United States | United States | 1–3 | 2–3 | Friendly |
| 3 | 8 November 2019 | 10 | Mapfre Stadium, Columbus, United States | United States | 2–3 | 2–3 | Friendly |
| 4 | 17 September 2020 | 11 | Gamla Ullevi, Gothenburg, Sweden | Hungary | 2–0 | 8–0 | UEFA Euro 2022 qualifying |
| 5 | 17 September 2020 | 11 | Gamla Ullevi, Gothenburg, Sweden | Hungary | 3–0 | 8–0 | UEFA Euro 2022 qualifying |
| 6 | 17 September 2020 | 11 | Gamla Ullevi, Gothenburg, Sweden | Hungary | 7–0 | 8–0 | UEFA Euro 2022 qualifying |
| 7 | 22 September 2020 | 12 | Laugardalsvöllur, Reykjavík, Iceland | Iceland | 1–0 | 1–1 | UEFA Euro 2022 qualifying |
| 8 | 22 October 2020 | 13 | Gamla Ullevi, Gothenburg, Sweden | Latvia | 2–0 | 7–0 | UEFA Euro 2022 qualifying |
| 9 | 27 July 2021 | 20 | Miyagi Stadium, Rifu, Japan | New Zealand | 1–0 | 2–0 | 2020 Summer Olympics |

== Honours ==
Växjö DFF

- Division 1: 2015
- Elitettan: 2017

FC Rosengård

- Damallsvenskan: 2019

BK Häcken

- Damallsvenskan: 2025
- UEFA Women's Europa Cup: 2025–26

Sweden

- FIFA Women's World Cup third place: 2019
- Summer Olympics silver medal: 2020

Individual

- Division 1 Golden Boot: 2015
- Elitettan Golden Boot: 2016, 2017
- Damallsvenskan Golden Boot: 2019, 2020
- SvFF Breakthrough Player of the Year: 2018
- Damallsvenskan Most Valuable Player: 2019
