= Monica Jusu Bah =

Swedish association football player

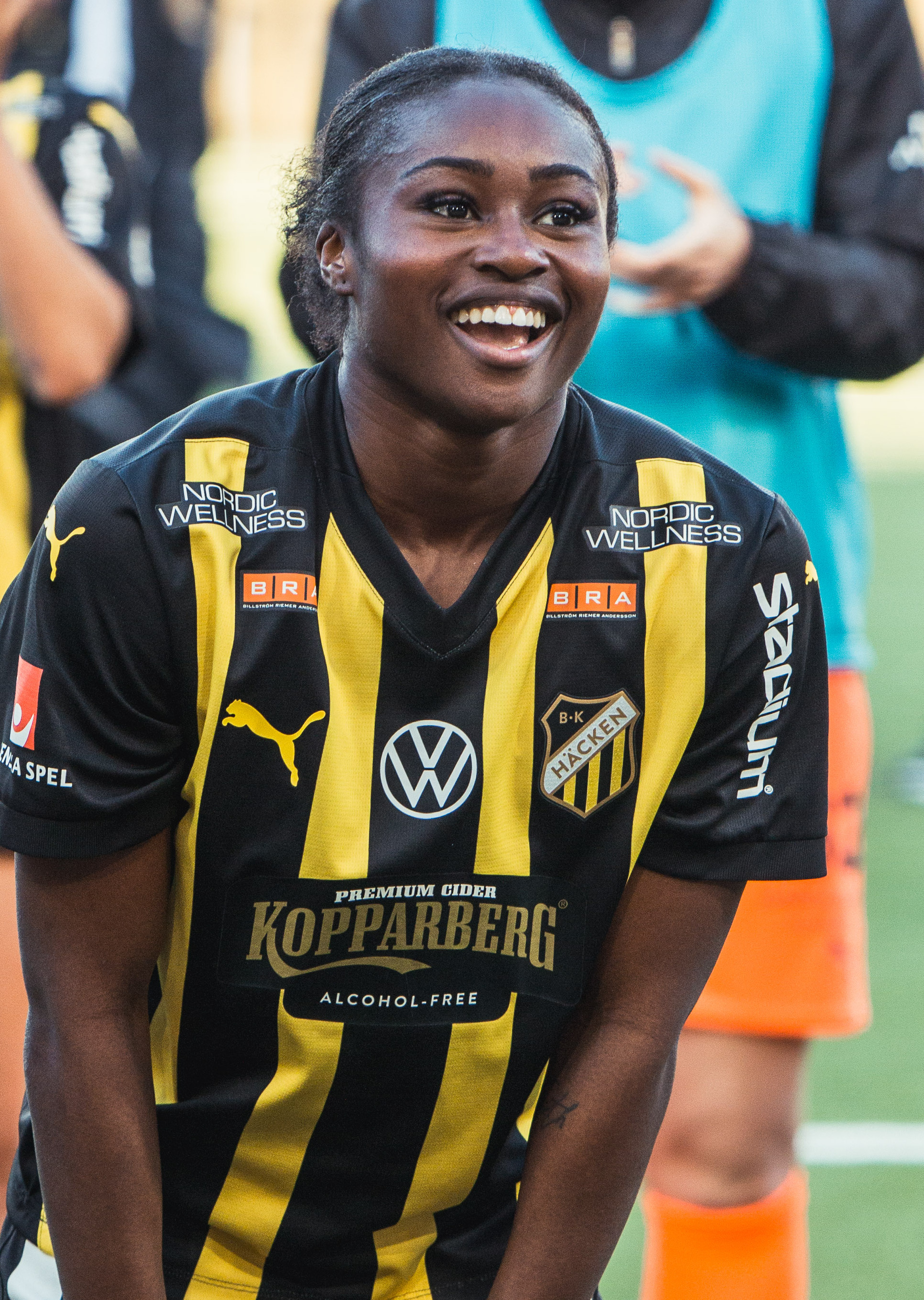
- Jusu Bah with Häcken in 2025

Personal information
- Full name: Monica Allonia Jusu Bah
- Date of birth: 16 May 2003 (age 23)
- Height: 1.60 m (5 ft 3 in)
- Positions: Left winger; striker

Team information
- Current team: Manchester United
- Number: 23

Youth career
- Mariehem
- Umeå IK

Senior career*
Years	Team	Apps	(Gls)
2020–2023	Umeå	52	(21)
2023–2026	Häcken	60	(15)
2026–	Manchester United	6	(0)

International career^{‡}
2018–2020	Sweden U17	19	(9)
2021	Sweden U19	4	(1)
2023–	Sweden U23	10	(2)
2024–	Sweden	12	(1)
- * Club domestic league appearances and goals as of 19:55, 14 November 2026 (UTC) ‡ National team caps and goals as of 10 October 2026

Monica Allonia Jusu Bah (born 16 May 2003) is a Swedish professional footballer who plays as a left winger or striker for Women's Super League club Manchester United and the Sweden national team. She previously played for Elitettan club Umeå IK and Damallsvenskan club BK Häcken.

== Club career ==
A product of Mariehem SK and Umeå IK's academies and having led Umeå to an under-19 league title, Jusu Bah broke into the Umeå first team in 2020.

In July 2023, Jusu Bah signed for BK Häcken. In September 2025, Jusu Bah extended her contract with Häcken until 2028.

On 28 August 2026, Jusu Bah signed for Manchester United on a four-year contract for a reported fee of just under £400,000.

== International career ==
Jusu Bah has represented Sweden as an under-17, under-19 and under-23 youth international.

Jusu Bah made her debut for the senior national team on 29 February 2024 in the second leg of Sweden's UEFA Women's Nations League promotion/relegation playoff against Bosnia and Herzegovina at 3Arena in Stockholm, having come on as a substitute for Rosa Kafaji. Sweden won both legs 5–0, adding up to a 10–0 aggregate win.

== Personal life ==
Jusu Bah is of Sierra Leonean descent.

== International goals ==
No.	Date	Venue	Opponent	Score	Result	Competition
1.	14 April 2026	Gamla Ullevi, Gothenburg, Sweden	Denmark	1–0	1–2	2027 FIFA Women's World Cup qualification

== Honors ==
BK Häcken

- Damallsvenskan: 2025
- UEFA Women's Europa Cup: 2025–26
