= Rebecka Blomqvist =

Swedish football forward

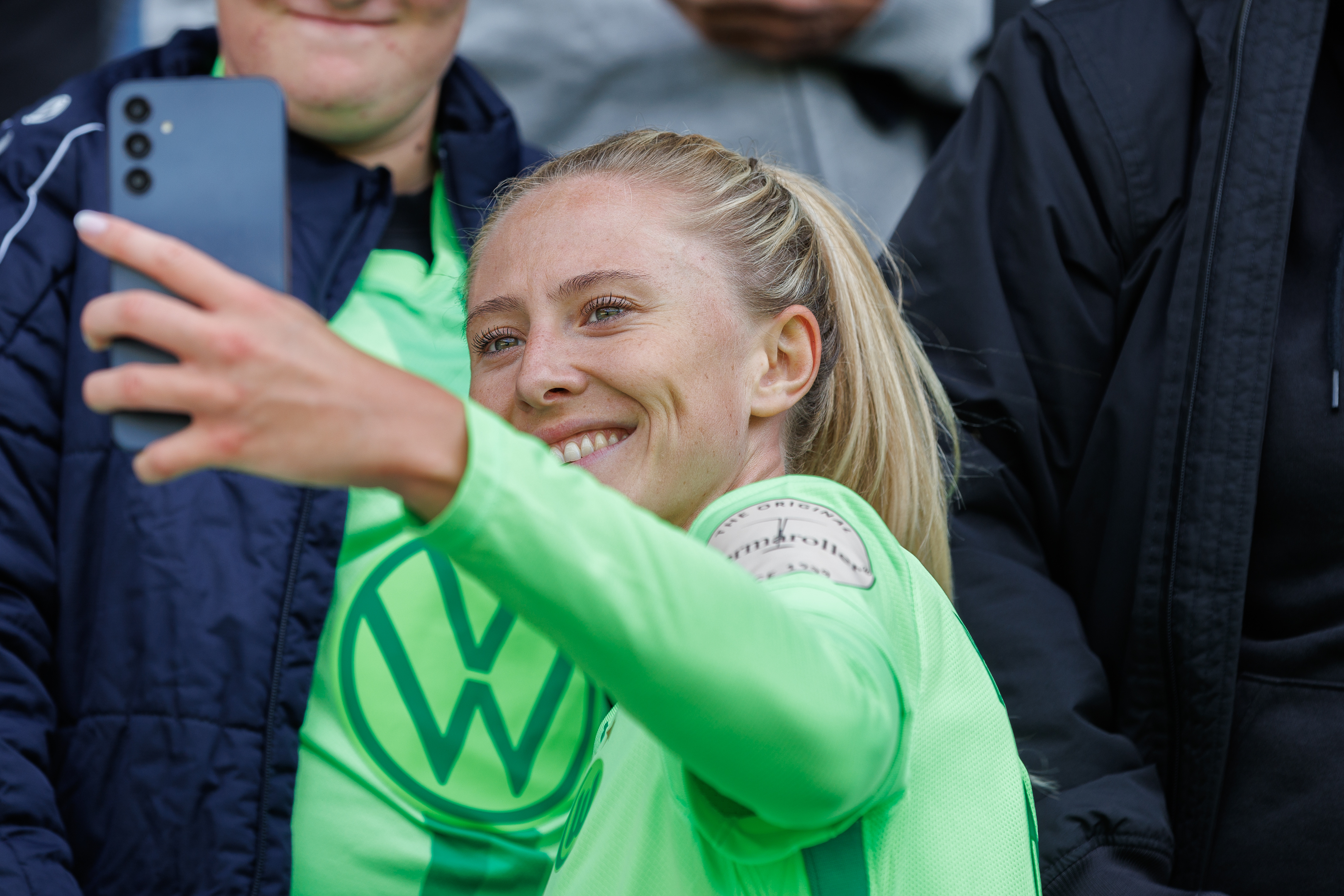
- Blomqvist in 2024

Personal information
- Full name: Rebecka Maria Blomqvist
- Date of birth: 24 July 1997 (age 29)
- Place of birth: Uddevalla, Sweden
- Position: Forward

Team information
- Current team: Eintracht Frankfurt
- Number: 28

Senior career*
| Years | Team | Apps | (Gls) |
| 2015–2020 | Kopparbergs/Göteborg FC | 122 | (45) |
| 2021–2025 | VfL Wolfsburg | 56 | (14) |
| 2025– | Eintracht Frankfurt | 30 | (12) |

International career^{‡}
| 2013 | Sweden U17 | 11 | (10) |
| 2014 | Sweden U19 | 18 | (3) |
| 2016 | Sweden U23 | 20 | (3) |
| 2019– | Sweden | 40 | (9) |
Medal record
Olympic Games
| Silver medal – second place | 2020 Tokyo | Team |
- * Club domestic league appearances and goals as of 21 November 2026 ‡ National team caps and goals as of 15 March 2026

Rebecka Maria Blomqvist (born 24 July 1997) is a Swedish professional footballer who currently plays as a forward for Frauen-Bundesliga club Eintracht Frankfurt and the Sweden national team.

== Club career ==
Blomqvist started her career in 2013 at IK Rössö Uddevalla in the Swedish third division (Division 1 Norra Götaland), where she scored 34 goals in 30 games.

After spending her first professional years at her youth club Kopparbergs/Göteborg FC and attracting attention with strong performances, she moved to German serial champions VfL Wolfsburg during the 2020/2021 winter break. She made her debut for the Wolves on 5 February 2021 in the match against Turbine Potsdam, scoring her first Bundesliga goal.

== International career ==
Blomqvist went through the Swedish junior teams and was able to win the 2015 European Championship with the U19. She made her debut as a substitute for the senior team in the first qualifying match for Euro 2022 on 3 September 2019 against Latvia. In the last qualifying game on 1 December 2020 she scored her first goal for the senior national team in the 5–0 win over Slovakia (final score: 6–0).

She was also nominated for the 2020 Olympics, postponed by a year due to the COVID-19 pandemic, initially as a reserve. After the squad had been increased due to the pandemic, the backups were also part of the squad. In terms of games, she was in the starting XI in a 2–0 win in the third group game against New Zealand, where some regulars were rested after the previous two victories. In the end, the Swedes won the silver medal, as in 2016, from a penalty shootout.

In the successful 2023 World Cup qualification, she came on as a substitute in three games and scored two goals. At the finals of the European Championship in England, which was also postponed by a year due to the COVID-19 pandemic, she only played briefly in the group game against Switzerland. With a 4–0 defeat against hosts England, the Swedes were eliminated in the semi-finals.

On 13 June 2023, she was included in the 23-player squad for the 2023 World Cup. She appeared in six of her team's seven games, coming on as a substitute five times in the final minutes. In the third group game against Argentina, she played over 90 minutes and scored one of her three tournament goals. In the 2–1 semifinal loss against Spain, she was able to equalize in the 88th minute eleven minutes after being substituted on, but the Spaniards scored the winning goal afterwards. With a 2–0 victory in the game for third place over Australia, she won the bronze medal. Together with Fridolina Rolfö, she was her team's second best goalscorer, after Amanda Ilestedt.

== International goals ==
| No. | Date | Venue | Opponent | Score | Result | Competition |
|---|---|---|---|---|---|---|
| 1. | 1 December 2020 | Anton Malatinský Stadium, Trnava, Slovakia | Slovakia | 5–0 | 6–0 | UEFA Women's Euro 2022 qualifying |
| 2. | 7 April 2022 | Tengiz Burjanadze Stadium, Gori, Georgia | Georgia | 12–0 | 15–0 | 2023 FIFA Women's World Cup qualification |
| 3. | 6 September 2022 | Tampere Stadium, Tampere, Finland | Finland | 4–0 | 5–0 | 2023 FIFA Women's World Cup qualification |
| 4. | 7 October 2022 | Estadio Nuevo Arcángel, Córdoba, Spain | Spain | 1–0 | 1–1 | Friendly |
| 5. | 29 July 2023 | Wellington Regional Stadium, Wellington, New Zealand | Italy | 5–0 | 5–0 | 2023 FIFA Women's World Cup |
| 6. | 2 August 2023 | Waikato Stadium, Hamilton, New Zealand | Argentina | 1–0 | 2–0 | 2023 FIFA Women's World Cup |
| 7. | 15 August 2023 | Eden Park, Auckland, New Zealand | Spain | 1–1 | 1–2 | 2023 FIFA Women's World Cup |
| 8. | 29 October 2024 | Gamla Ullevi, Gothenburg, Sweden | Luxembourg | 7–0 | 8–0 | UEFA Women's Euro 2025 qualifying play-offs |
| 9. | 29 October 2024 | Gamla Ullevi, Gothenburg, Sweden | Luxembourg | 8–0 | 8–0 | UEFA Women's Euro 2025 qualifying play-offs |

== Honors ==
Sweden U19

- Under-19 Championship Winner: 2015

VfL Wolfsburg

- German Champion: 2022
- German Cup: 2021, 2022, 2023, 2024

Kopparbergs/Göteborg

- Swedish Championship: 2020
