= 2020 Damallsvenskan =

Damallsvenskan
- Season: 2020
- Champions: Kopparbergs/Göteborg FC
- Relegated: Umeå IK; IK Uppsala Fotboll
- Champions League: Kopparbergs/Göteborg FC; Rosengård
- Matches: 132
- Goals: 383 (2.9 per match)
- Top goalscorer: Anna Anvegård (16 goals)
- Biggest home win: Rosengård 7–1 Linköpings (12 August 2020) Rosengård 6–0 Örebro (24 July 2020)
- Biggest away win: Uppsala 1–9 Rosengård (7 August 2020)
- Highest scoring: Uppsala 1–9 Rosengård (7 August 2020)
- All statistics correct as of 15 November 2020.

The 2020 Damallsvenskan was the 33rd season of the Swedish women's association football top division, Damallsvenskan. The league was originally set to commence on 3 April 2020, but due to the effects of the COVID-19 pandemic it was postponed, and eventually set to begin on 27 June, and end on 15 November. All matches were played without spectators.

Legandary Umeå IK returned to the top tier after 3 years in Elitettan but were relegated alongside Uppsala again at the end of the season. Göteborg were the champions, claiming their first Damallsvenskan title.

All matches were viewed worldwide, except for Mexico, for a fee at Damallsvenskan TV. Aftonbladet have bought broadcasting rights for all Damallsvenskan matches from 2020 to 2022 and will have them available at Sportbladet Play.

== Teams ==
Locations of the 2020 Damallsvenskan in Sweden.

Team	Location	Stadium	Turf	Stadium capacity^{a}
Djurgårdens IF	Stockholm	Stockholm Olympic Stadium	Natural	14,417
Eskilstuna United DFF	Eskilstuna	Tunavallen	Artificial	7,600
FC Rosengård	Malmö	Malmö IP	Artificial	5,700
KIF Örebro DFF	Örebro	Behrn Arena	Artificial	12,624
Kopparbergs/Göteborg FC	Gothenburg	Valhalla IP	Artificial	4,000
Kristianstads DFF	Kristianstad	Kristianstads fotbollsarena	Hybrid	3,080^{b}
Kristianstads DFF	Kristianstad	Vilans IP	Natural	5,000^{b}
Linköpings FC	Linköping	Arena Linköping	Artificial	8,500
Piteå IF	Piteå	LF Arena	Artificial	3,000
Vittsjö GIK	Vittsjö	Vittsjö IP	Natural	3,000
Växjö DFF	Växjö	Myresjöhus Arena	Artificial	12,173
Umeå IK	Umeå	Umeå Energi Arena	Artificial	8,000
IK Uppsala Fotboll	Uppsala	Lötens IP	Artificial	n/a

Notes: ^{a} According to each club information page previously available at the Swedish Football Association website for Damallsvenskan, unless otherwise noted. Since May 2018 this is no longer present. Numbers were usually lower than official stadium numbers.
^{b} According to Kristianstads DFF's history web page.

== Standings ==
Pos	Team	Pld	W	D	L	GF	GA	GD	Pts	Qualification or relegation
1	Kopparbergs/Göteborg FC (C)	22	17	3	2	55	10	+45	54	Qualification to Champions League second round
2	FC Rosengård	22	14	5	3	57	14	+43	47	Qualification to Champions League second round
3	Kristianstads DFF	22	14	3	5	48	29	+19	45	Qualification to Champions League first round
4	Linköpings FC	22	12	3	7	32	34	−2	39	
5	Vittsjö GIK	22	9	4	9	33	35	−2	31	
6	Växjö DFF	22	8	3	11	18	32	−14	27	
7	KIF Örebro DFF	22	7	5	10	26	36	−10	26	
8	Piteå IF	22	7	4	11	21	33	−12	25	
9	Djurgårdens IF	22	6	6	10	20	31	−11	24	
10	Eskilstuna United DFF	22	7	2	13	31	35	−4	23	
11	Umeå IK (R)	22	6	5	11	21	40	−19	23	Relegation to Elitettan
12	IK Uppsala Fotboll (R)	22	3	1	18	21	54	−33	10	Relegation to Elitettan

Source: svenskfotboll.se
Rules for classification: 1) Points; 2) Goal difference; 3) Number of goals scored; 4) Head-to-head points; 5) Head-to-head goal difference; 6) Head-to-head away goals scored
(C) Champions; (R) Relegated

== Positions by round ==
Team ╲ Round	1	2	3	4	5	6	7	8	9	10	11	12	13	14	15	16	17	18	19	20	21	22
Kopparbergs/Göteborg FC	1	3	2	1	1	1	1	1	1	1	1	2	2	2	2	2	1	1	1	1	1	1
FC Rosengård	5	2	4	3	3	2	2	2	2	2	2	1	1	1	1	1	2	2	2	2	2	2
Kristianstads DFF	12	12	11	9	7	6	5	4	4	3	3	4	3	3	3	3	3	3	3	3	3	3
Linköpings FC	2	1	1	2	2	3	3	3	3	4	4	3	4	4	4	4	4	4	4	4	4	4
Vittsjö GIK	10	11	8	10	10	12	12	11	12	12	11	9	8	5	5	5	5	5	5	5	5	5
Växjö DFF	11	10	12	12	12	11	11	10	11	11	12	12	12	12	11	11	11	10	7	9	7	6
KIF Örebro DFF	7	7	5	6	5	7	8	9	7	5	6	5	6	6	6	7	8	6	6	6	6	7
Piteå IF	3	4	3	4	4	4	4	5	6	7	8	10	10	10	9	10	10	11	10	8	9	8
Djurgårdens IF	8	8	9	8	9	9	7	8	10	10	9	8	7	8	8	9	7	8	9	10	10	9
Eskilstuna United DFF	6	6	6	7	8	5	6	7	5	8	5	7	9	9	10	8	6	7	8	7	8	10
Umeå IK	9	9	10	11	11	10	10	12	9	6	7	6	5	7	7	6	9	9	11	11	11	11
IK Uppsala Fotboll	4	5	7	5	6	8	9	6	8	9	11	11	11	11	12	12	12	12	12	12	12	12

Source: everysport.com
= Leader; = Runner up; = Third Place; = Relegation to 2021 Elitettan

== Results ==
Home \ Away	DIF	ESK	FCR	KGFC	KIFÖ	KDFF	LFC	PIF	UIK	UPP	VÄX	VGIK
Djurgårdens IF		2–1	0–0	0–3	0–1	3–3	0–3	1–0	1–1	2–0	2–1	2–1
Eskilstuna United DFF	3–2		1–2	1–1	3–1	2–3	0–1	2–0	0–1	1–3	3–0	3–1
FC Rosengård	3–0	1–2		3–0	6–0	1–2	7–1	2–1	0–0	5–1	0–1	1–0
Kopparbergs/Göteborg FC	2–0	3–0	1–1		1–1	5–1	2–0	3–0	2–0	3–0	4–0	3–1
KIF Örebro DFF	2–0	3–3	0–3	0–1		1–2	1–1	0–1	5–1	2–1	1–0	1–2
Kristianstads DFF	0–1	1–0	0–1	1–0	4–2		1–2	3–1	1–1	2–1	2–0	4–0
Linköpings FC	1–0	1–0	2–2	0–7	1–0	0–3		1–2	3–0	3–1	3–0	1–2
Piteå IF	1–1	1–0	0–3	1–5	1–1	2–3	2–2		1–2	2–0	0–1	0–0
Umeå IK	0–0	1–0	0–3	0–2	1–2	0–4	3–2	2–3		1–0	1–3	3–0
IK Uppsala Fotboll	3–2	2–4	1–9	0–2	1–2	1–4	0–1	0–1	3–0		0–2	0–1
Växjö DFF	1–0	2–0	0–3	0–3	0–0	2–1	0–1	1–0	2–2	1–1		0–2
Vittsjö GIK	1–1	3–2	1–1	0–2	4–0	3–3	1–2	0–1	3–2	4–2	3–1	

Source: svenskfotboll.se (in Swedish)
Legend: Blue = home team win; Yellow = draw; Red = away team win.

== WDL table ==
Team ╲ Round	1	2	3	4	5	6	7	8	9	10	11	12	13	14	15	16	17	18	19	20	21	22
FC Rosengård	W	W	L	W	W	W	D	W	W	W	D	W	W	W	W	D	D	L	D	W	W	L
Ground	H	A	H	A	A	H	A	H	A	H	A	H	A	H	A	H	A	H	A	H	A	H
Position	5	2	4	3	3	2	2	2	2	2	2	1	1	1	1	1	2	2	2	2	2	2
Kopparbergs/Göteborg FC	W	D	W	W	W	W	W	W	W	W	W	L	L	W	W	W	W	W	D	W	W	W
Ground	H	A	H	A	H	A	H	H	A	A	H	A	A	H	A	H	A	H	H	A	A	H
Position	1	3	2	1	1	1	1	1	1	1	1	2	2	2	2	2	1	1	1	1	1	1
Vittsjö GIK	L	L	D	L	L	L	W	W	L	W	W	W	W	W	W	D	D	W	D	L	W	L
Ground	A	H	H	A	H	A	H	A	A	H	A	H	H	A	A	H	A	H	H	A	H	A
Position	10	11	8	10	10	11	12	11	12	12	10	9	8	5	5	5	5	5	5	5	5	5
Eskilstuna United DFF	D	D	W	L	L	W	L	L	W	L	W	L	L	L	L	W	W	L	L	W	L	L
Ground	A	H	A	A	A	H	A	H	H	A	H	A	H	A	A	H	A	H	A	H	A	H
Position	6	6	6	7	8	5	6	7	5	8	5	7	9	9	10	8	6	7	8	7	8	10
Linköpings FC	W	W	W	D	W	L	W	L	L	L	W	W	D	W	L	W	D	W	W	L	L	W
Ground	H	A	H	A	H	A	H	A	H	A	H	A	A	H	H	A	H	A	A	H	H	A
Position	2	1	1	2	2	3	3	3	3	4	4	3	4	4	4	4	4	4	4	4	4	4
Piteå IF	W	D	W	D	W	L	L	L	L	D	L	L	L	L	W	L	D	L	W	W	L	W
Ground	A	H	A	H	A	H	A	A	H	H	A	H	A	H	H	A	H	A	H	A	H	A
Position	3	4	3	4	4	4	4	5	6	7	8	10	10	10	9	10	10	11	10	8	9	8
Kristianstads DFF	L	L	D	W	W	D	W	D	W	W	W	L	W	W	W	L	W	W	W	W	W	L
Ground	A	H	A	A	H	A	H	H	A	H	A	H	H	A	H	A	H	A	A	H	A	H
Position	12	12	11	9	7	6	5	4	4	3	3	4	3	3	3	3	3	3	3	3	3	3
KIF Örebro DFF	D	D	W	L	W	L	L	L	W	W	L	W	D	D	L	L	L	W	D	W	L	L
Ground	H	A	A	H	H	A	A	H	A	H	H	A	H	A	H	A	A	H	A	H	A	H
Position	7	7	5	6	5	7	8	9	7	5	6	5	6	6	6	7	8	6	6	6	6	7
Växjö DFF	L	D	L	L	L	W	D	W	L	L	L	L	L	D	W	W	L	W	W	L	W	W
Ground	A	H	A	H	A	A	H	H	A	A	H	H	A	H	A	H	A	H	A	H	H	A
Position	11	10	12	12	12	11	11	10	11	11	12	12	12	12	11	11	11	10	7	9	7	6
Djurgårdens IF	L	D	L	W	L	D	W	L	L	D	D	W	W	L	L	D	W	L	L	L	D	W
Ground	A	H	A	H	A	H	H	A	H	A	H	A	H	A	H	A	H	A	H	A	A	H
Position	8	8	9	8	9	9	7	8	10	10	9	8	7	8	8	9	7	8	9	10	10	9
Umeå IK	L	D	L	L	L	W	D	D	W	W	L	W	W	L	L	D	L	L	L	L	D	W
Ground	H	A	H	A	H	H	A	A	H	H	A	A	H	A	H	A	H	A	H	A	H	A
Position	9	9	10	11	11	10	10	12	9	6	7	6	5	7	7	6	9	9	11	11	11	11
IK Uppsala Fotboll	W	D	L	W	L	L	L	W	L	L	L	L	L	L	L	L	L	L	L	L	L	L
Ground	H	A	H	H	A	H	A	H	H	A	A	H	A	H	A	H	H	A	H	A	H	A
Position	4	5	7	5	6	8	9	6	8	9	11	11	11	11	12	12	12	12	12	12	12	12

Source: everysport.com
A = Away; H = Home; W = Win; D = Draw; L = Loss; = Leader; = Runner up; = Relegation to 2021 Elitettan

== Player statistics ==
=== Top scorers ===
As of matches played on 15 November 2020.

Rank	Player	Club	Goals
1	(Sweden) Anna Anvegård	FC Rosengård	16
2	(Sweden) Pauline Hammarlund	Kopparbergs/Göteborg FC	12
2	(Sweden) Mimmi Larsson	FC Rosengård	12
4	(Sweden) Karin Lundin	KIF Örebro DFF	11
4	(Sweden) Loreta Kullashi	Eskilstuna United DFF	11
4	(Sweden) Felicia Rogic	Eskilstuna United DFF	11
7	(Sweden) Rebecka Blomqvist	Kopparbergs/Göteborg FC	9
7	(Sweden) Clara Markstedt	Vittsjö GIK	9
