= Karin Lundin =

Swedish footballer (born 1994)

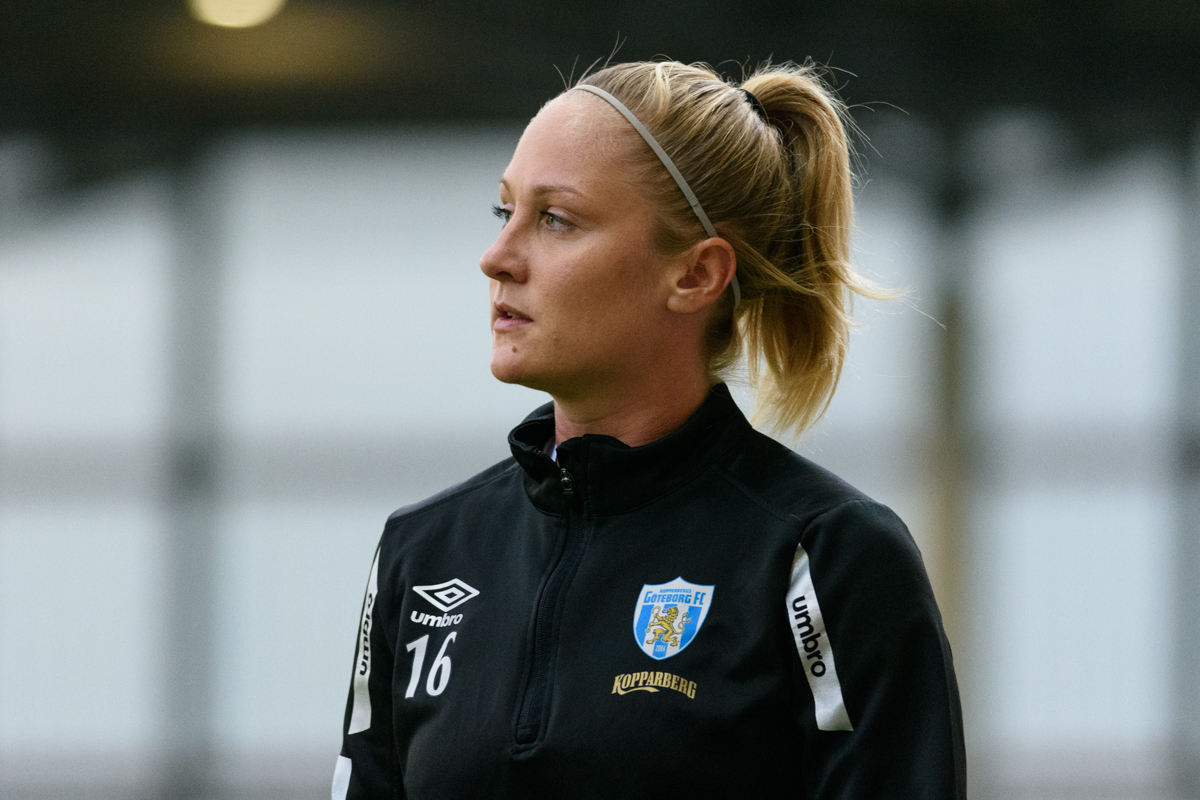
- Lundin in 2019

Personal information
- Full name: Karin Maria Lundin
- Date of birth: 4 December 1994 (age 31)
- Place of birth: Sweden
- Height: 1.72 m (5 ft 8 in)
- Position: Forward

Team information
- Current team: Alingsås
- Number: 18

Senior career*
Years	Team	Apps	(Gls)
2015–2018	Kungsbacka DFF	77	(37)
2018–2019	BK Häcken	21	(2)
2020–2021	KIF Örebro DFF	32	(15)
2021–2022	Fiorentina	19	(8)
2022–2023	FC Rosengård	27	(8)
2023–2024	Fiorentina	25	(1)
2025–	Alingsås	23	(5)
- * Club domestic league appearances and goals as of 02:18, 15 December 2025 (UTC)

Karin Maria Lundin (born 4 December 1994) is a Swedish footballer who plays as a forward for Damallsvenskan club Alingsås.

== Honours ==
Rosengård

- Svenska Cupen: 2017-18
- Damallsvenskan: 2022
