= Alva Selerud =

Swedish footballer (born 2000)

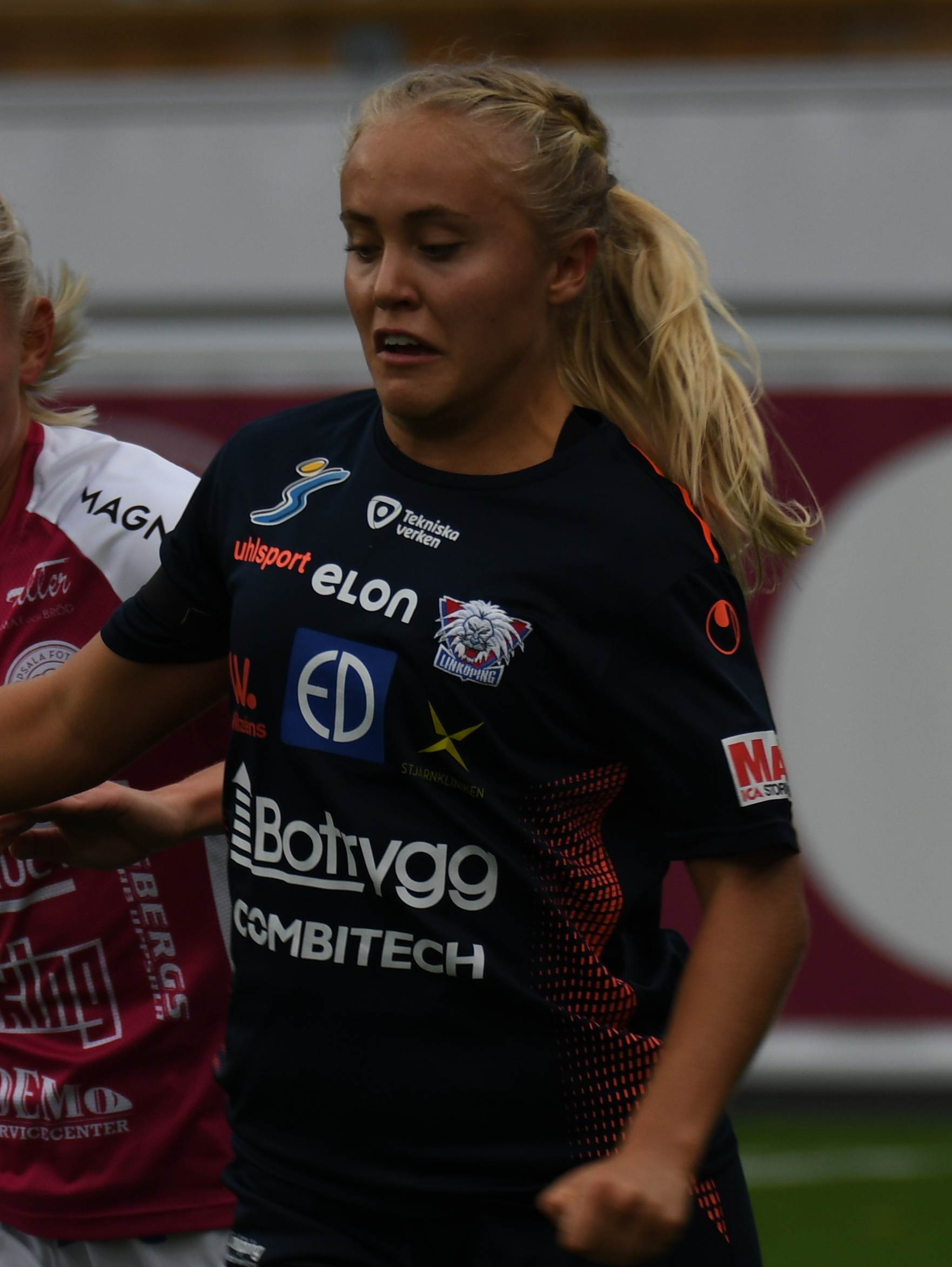
- Selerud with Linköping in 2020

Personal information
- Full name: Emma Alva Elisabeth Selerud
- Date of birth: 3 March 2000 (age 26)
- Place of birth: Svärtinge, Sweden
- Height: 1.69 m (5 ft 7 in)
- Positions: Left winger; left wing-back

Team information
- Current team: BK Häcken FF
- Number: 15

Youth career
- Svärtinge SK
- –2015: IFK Norrköping

Senior career*
Years	Team	Apps	(Gls)
2015–2017	IFK Norrköping	25	(11)
2017–2023	Linköping	78	(5)
2019	→ IFK Norrköping (loan)	10	(7)
2021	→ IFK Norrköping (loan)	3	(1)
2023–2024	Roma	2	(0)
2024–	BK Häcken	16	(2)

International career^{‡}
2018–2019	Sweden U19	9	(0)
2022	Sweden U23	9	(0)
- * Club domestic league appearances and goals as of 00:59, 1 January 2026 (UTC) ‡ National team caps and goals as of 13 January 2023

Emma Alva Elisabeth Selerud (born 3 March 2000) is a Swedish professional footballer who plays as a left winger or left wing-back for Damallsvenskan club BK Häcken FF.

== Club career ==
Selerud started her playing career at Svärtinge SK, before joining IFK Norrköping, where she made her senior debut in 2015, aged 15.

In December 2016, it was announced that Selerud had agreed to join Damallsvenskan side Linköping, with the deal set to activate at the start of the 2017 season. She subsequently made her professional debut on 15 May 2017, coming on as a substitute for Lina Hurtig at the 85th minute of a 4–1 league win against KIF Örebro. Having collected eight league appearances throughout the campaign, she helped the club win their second national title in a row.

Having found limited playing time with Linköping's first team, Selerud was sent back on loan to IFK Norrköping for the first part of the 2019 season, scoring seven goals in ten games for the club in the Division 1 Mellersta Götaland. At the end of the same campaign, she was re-signed by Linköping for the 2020 season, with an option for another year.

On 3 October 2020, Selerud scored her first professional goal in a 2–2 league draw against Rosengård. In December 2020, she extended her contract with the club again, signing a new three-year deal.

In the 2022 campaign, Selerud registered two goals and seven assists, as Linköping finished third in the league, thus qualifying for the first round of the 2023–24 UEFA Women's Champions League. On 2 January 2023, she officially announced her departure from the club after six years.

On 11 January 2023, Selerud joined Serie A side Roma on a permanent deal, signing a contract until June 2025. She then made her debut for the Italian club on 25 January, coming on as a substitute for Elena Linari at the 69th minute of a 8–1 Coppa Italia win over Pomigliano.

== International career ==
Selerud represented Sweden at youth international level, having played for the under-19 and under-23 national teams.

In January 2023, she took part in a training camp with the Swedish senior national team, under head coach Peter Gerhardsson.

== Honours ==
Linköpings FC

- Damallsvenskan: 2017

Roma

- Serie A: 2022–23
- Supercoppa Italiana: 2022

BK Häcken

- Damallsvenskan: 2025
- UEFA Women's Europa Cup: 2025–26
