= Pernille Sanvig =

Danish footballer

Personal information
- Full name: Pernille Marie Hesselholt Sanvig
- Date of birth: 26 November 2005 (age 20)
- Height: 1.63 m (5 ft 4 in)
- Position: Midfielder

Team information
- Current team: BK Häcken
- Number: 7

Senior career*
Years	Team	Apps	(Gls)
2021–2024	Kolding IF	47	(1)
2024	Eintracht Frankfurt II	6	(1)
2024–2026	Eintracht Frankfurt	7	(1)
2025–2026	→ BK Häcken (loan)	22	(1)
2026–	BK Häcken	13	(0)

International career^{‡}
2021	Denmark U16	3	(0)
2021–2022	Denmark U17	11	(1)
2022–2024	Denmark U19	25	(0)
2025–	Denmark U23	4	(0)
- * Club domestic league appearances and goals as of 21 November 2026 ‡ National team caps and goals as of 6 April 2025

Pernille Marie Hesselholt Sanvig (born 26 November 2005) is a Danish professional footballer who plays as a midfielder for Damallsvenskan club BK Häcken. She began her football career at the age of 15 with the team Kolding IF.

== International career ==
Sanvig has represented Denmark at youth level.

== Honors ==
BK Häcken

- Damallsvenskan: 2025
- UEFA Women's Europa Cup: 2025–26
