= Helena Sampaio (footballer) =

Brazilian footballer (born 2002)

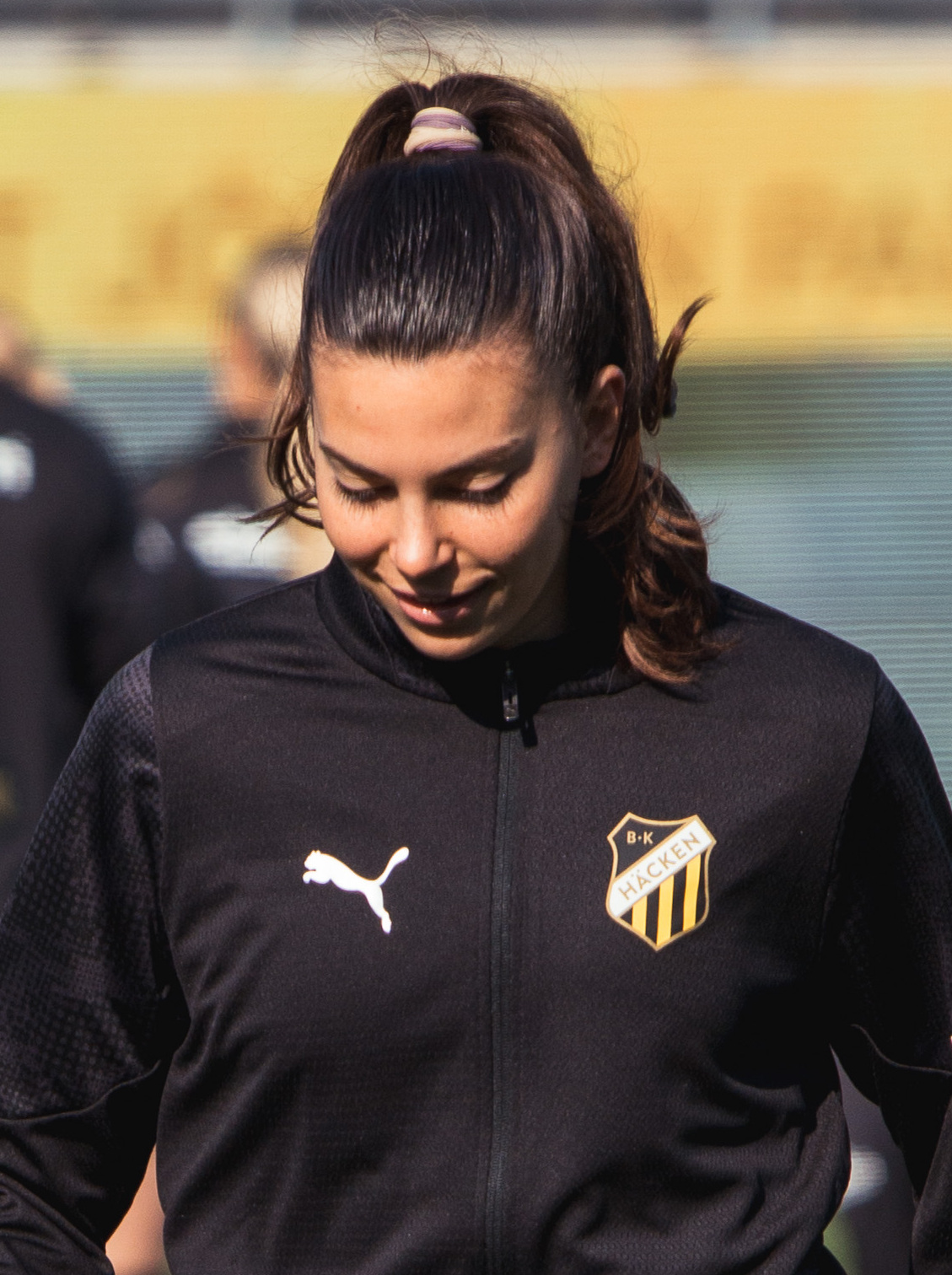
- Sampaio with BK Häcken in 2025

Personal information
- Full name: Helena Rodriguez Sampaio
- Date of birth: February 4, 2002 (age 24)
- Place of birth: Porto Alegre, Brazil
- Height: 5 ft 9 in (1.75 m)
- Position: Midfielder

Team information
- Current team: BK Häcken
- Number: 30

College career
Years	Team	Apps	(Gls)
2021–2024	USC Trojans	78	(12)

Senior career*
Years	Team	Apps	(Gls)
2025–	BK Häcken	22	(3)

International career
2018	Brazil U-17		
- * Club domestic league appearances and goals as of November 8, 2025

Helena Rodriguez Sampaio (born February 4, 2002) is a Brazilian professional footballer who plays as a midfielder for Damallsvenskan club BK Häcken. She played college soccer for the USC Trojans, earning first-team All-American honors in 2024.

== Early life ==
Growing up in Porto Alegre, Sampaio began playing football with boys when she was four. She only started playing on a girls' team in her early teens when she joined Grêmio's new women's side before briefly playing with Internacional. She started high school at Colégio Marista Rosário in Porto Alegre, where she led the football team to two state cup titles. When she was 15, she successfully tried out for IMG Academy in Bradenton, Florida, and received a scholarship to train and finish high school there.

== College career ==
Sampaio played for the USC Trojans from 2021 to 2024, scoring 12 goals with 18 assists in 78 appearances. During her sophomore season, new head coach Jane Alukonis put Sampaio into the starting lineup, and she recorded a team-second-best 8 assists in 18 games. She started all 19 games in her junior season, scoring 6 goals with 3 assists and earning All-Pac-12 Conference second-team honors. With the program's move to the Big Ten Conference in her senior season, she scored 5 goals with a team-best 7 assists in 23 games, helping USC to the conference regular-season title and the NCAA tournament quarterfinals. Following her senior season, she was named the Big Ten Midfielder of the Year, first-team All-Big Ten, and first-team All-American.

== Club career ==
Swedish club BK Häcken announced on January 5, 2025, that they had signed Sampaio to her first professional contract on a two-and-a-half-year deal. She was the club's first Brazilian player. She made her professional debut on March 15 as a stoppage-time substitute against Djurgården in the Svenska Cupen. On May 16, she scored her first professional goal to conclude a 6–1 league win over Alingsås. On October 7, she scored her first professional hat trick, and her first continental goals, against Polish club Katowice in the second qualifying round of the UEFA Women's Europa Cup, breaking a stalemate just seconds after replacing Felicia Schröder in the eventual 4–0 win. On November 8, she started in a 2–0 win over Djurgården as Häcken clinched the league championship for the second time in club history.

On February 18, 2026, Sampaio tore her anterior cruciate ligament (ACL) during the Europa Cup match against Breiðablik, missing the rest of the season as Hacken became the tournament's inaugural champions.

== International career ==
Sampaio trained with Brazil's under-17 team and was an alternate for Brazil's roster at the 2018 FIFA U-17 Women's World Cup.

== Honors and awards ==
USC Trojans

- Big Ten Conference: 2024

BK Häcken

- Damallsvenskan: 2025, 2026
- UEFA Women's Europa Cup: 2025–26

Individual

- First-team All-American: 2024
- Big Ten Midfielder of the Year: 2024
- First-team All-Big Ten: 2024
- Second-team All-Pac-12: 2023
