= Thelma Karen Pálmadóttir =

Icelandic association football player

Personal information
- Date of birth: 18 April 2008 (age 18)
- Position: Forward

International career^{‡}
Years	Team	Apps	(Gls)
2025–	Iceland	6	(1)
- ‡ National team caps and goals as of 11 October 2026

Thelma Karen Pálmadóttir (born 18 April 2008) is an Icelandic footballer who plays for BK Häcken and the Iceland national team.

== International career ==
Pálmadóttir scored her first international goal against Ukraine.

=== International goals ===
No.	Date	Venue	Opponent	Score	Result	Competition
1.	5 June 2026	Stadion Stali Mielec, Mielec, Poland	Ukraine	1–0	1–0	2027 FIFA Women's World Cup qualification
