= BK Häcken FF =

Swedish women's football club

BK Häcken
- Full name: Bollklubben Häcken Fotbollsförening
- Nickname: Getingarna (the Wasps)
- Founded: 1970; 56 years ago, as Landvetters IF
- Ground: Nordic Wellness Arena; Gothenburg, Sweden
- Capacity: 6,300
- Chairman: Anders Billström
- Manager: Elena Sadiku
- League: Damallsvenskan
- 2026: Damallsvenskan, 1st of 14
- Website: https://bkhacken.se/sida/dam
Home colours	Away colours

Bollklubben Häcken Fotbollsförening is a women's football club based in Gothenburg, Sweden. Founded in 1970 as Landvetters IF and known as Kopparbergs/Göteborg FC between 2004 and 2020, the club became the women's section of the men's club BK Häcken in 2021, although as a separate club which is a subsidiary of BK Häcken for legal reasons. The A team play in the Damallsvenskan, the top tier of Swedish women's football, while the B team play in the Elitettan, the second tier.

BK Häcken FF play their home games at Bravida Arena in Gothenburg. The team's colours are yellow and black. The club won their first Damallsvenskan title in 2020, and won a second title in 2025, and again in 2026. Additionally, the club also won the inaugural UEFA Women's Europa Cup in the 2025–26 season.

== History ==
BK Häcken was established in 1970 as Landvetters IF in Landvetter, a town near Gothenburg. In 2004, the club moved into Gothenburg city and changed its name to Kopparbergs/Göteborg FC accordingly.

Veteran Bo Falk was the club's head coach from 1999 until 2004. From 2005 until 2007, the coach was Martin Pringle. He was replaced by Torbjörn Nilsson for the 2008 season.

In the 2010 Damallsvenskan season, Kopparbergs/Göteborg FC finished as runners-up and qualified for the 2011–12 UEFA Women's Champions League for the first time. In 2011, they won the Swedish Cup on a penalty shootout over Tyresö, before retaining the trophy in 2012 by beating Tyresö in the final again.

Kopparbergs/Göteborg FC won their first league title in 2020. On 29 December 2020, the club board announced its intention to cease operating the first team in the Damallsvenskan. Two days later, it reversed the decision to continue in 2021. However, on 28 January the club became the women's department of BK Häcken, a men's football club also based in Gothenburg and playing in top tier Allsvenskan.

== Squad ==
As of 22 September 2026

Note: Flags indicate national team as defined under FIFA eligibility rules; some limited exceptions apply. Players may hold more than one non-FIFA nationality.

No.	Pos.	Nation	Player
3	DF	AUS	Aivi Luik
4	DF	SWE	Emma Östlund
5	MF	USA	Laney Egbuka
6	FW	NGR	Joy Omewa
7	MF	DEN	Pernille Sanvig
8	MF	SWE	Josefin Baudou
9	FW	SWE	Maja Bodin
10	FW	SWE	Anna Anvegård
11	FW	SWE	Tuva Ölvestad
12	DF	DEN	Stine Sandbech
13	GK	SWE	Jennifer Falk
14	FW	SWE	Tilde Karlsson
15	DF	SWE	Alva Selerud
17	MF	MAW	Faith Chinzimu

No.	Pos.	Nation	Player
18	DF	SWE	Lisa Löwing
19	DF	SWE	Nesrin Akgün
20	DF	SWE	Josefine Rybrink
21	MF	DEN	Jóhanna Fossdalsá
22	DF	CAN	Ella McBride
23	MF	SWE	Elin Rubensson
24	DF	USA	Tabby Tindell
25	FW	NOR	Julie Steen
26	MF	SWE	Nathalie Staaf
27	FW	ISL	Thelma Pálmadóttir
28	MF	NGR	Halimatu Ayinde
29	GK	SWE	Hanna Karlsson
30	MF	BRA	Helena Sampaio
40	GK	SWE	Disa Hellwig

=== Loans out ===
Note: Flags indicate national team as defined under FIFA eligibility rules; some limited exceptions apply. Players may hold more than one non-FIFA nationality.

No.	Pos.	Nation	Player

== Honours ==
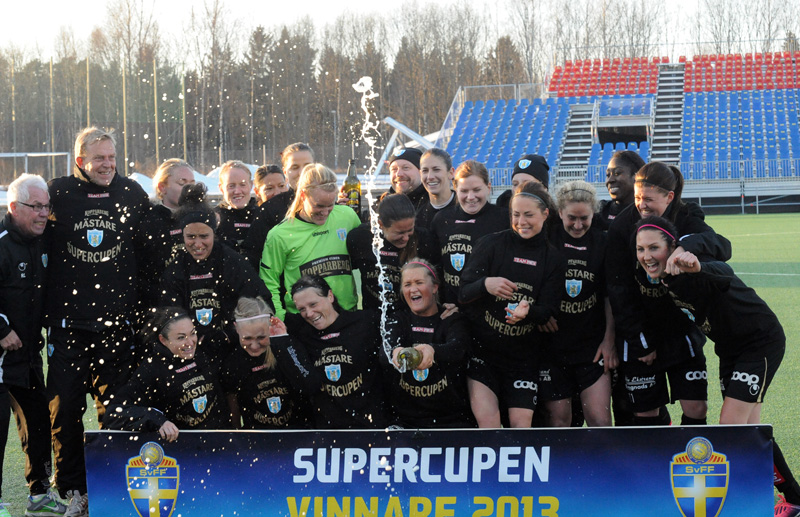
Winning the Supercupen in April 2013

=== Domestic ===
- Damallsvenskan: 2020, 2025, 2026
- Svenska Cupen: 2011, 2012, 2019, 2021
- Svenska Supercupen: 2013

=== Continental ===
- UEFA Women's Europa Cup: 2025–26

== European record ==
All results (away, home and aggregate) list Kopparbergs/Göteborg's goal tally first.

Season	Competition	Round	Club	Away	Home	Aggregate
2011–12	UEFA Women's Champions League	Round of 32	(Croatia) Osijek	4–0^{f}	7–0	11–0
2011–12	UEFA Women's Champions League	Round of 16	(Denmark) Fortuna Hjørring	1–0^{f}	3–2	4–2
2011–12	UEFA Women's Champions League	Quarter-finals	(England) Arsenal	1–3^{f}	1–0	2–3
2012–13	UEFA Women's Champions League	Round of 32	(Serbia) Spartak Subotica	1–0^{f}	3–0	4–0
2012–13	UEFA Women's Champions League	Round of 16	(Denmark) Fortuna Hjørring	1–1^{f}	3–2	4–3
2012–13	UEFA Women's Champions League	Quarter-finals	(France) Juvisy	0–1^{f}	1–3	1–4
2019–20	UEFA Women's Champions League	Round of 32	(Germany) Bayern Munich	1–0	1–2^{f}	2–2(a)
2020–21	UEFA Women's Champions League	Round of 32	(England) Manchester City	0–3	1–2^{f}	1–5
2021–22	UEFA Women's Champions League	Round of 32	(Norway) Vålerenga	3–1^{f}	3–2	6–3
2021–22	UEFA Women's Champions League	Group stage	(Portugal) Benfica	1–0^{f}	1–2	3rd
2021–22	UEFA Women's Champions League	Group stage	(Germany) Bayern Munich	0–4^{f}	1–5	3rd
2021–22	UEFA Women's Champions League	Group stage	(France) Lyon	0–4	0–3 ^{f}	3rd
2022–23	UEFA Women's Champions League	Qualifying round 2	(France) Paris Saint-Germain	1–2^{f}	0–2	1–4
2023–24	UEFA Women's Champions League	Qualifying round 2	(Netherlands) Twente	1–2	2–2^{f}	4–3
2023–24	UEFA Women's Champions League	Group stage	(Spain) Real Madrid	1–0	2–1^{f}	2nd
2023–24	UEFA Women's Champions League	Group stage	(England) Chelsea	0–0^{f}	1–3	2nd
2023–24	UEFA Women's Champions League	Group stage	(France) Paris FC	2–1^{f}	0–0	2nd
2023–24	UEFA Women's Champions League	Quarter-finals	(France) Paris Saint-Germain	0–3	1–2^{f}	1–5
2024–25	UEFA Women's Champions League	Qualifying round 2	(England) Arsenal	0–4	1–0^{f}	1–4
2025–26	UEFA Women's Champions League	Qualifying round 3	(Spain) Atlético Madrid	1–1^{f}	1–2	2–3
2025–26	UEFA Women's Europa Cup	Second qualifying round	(Poland) GKS Katowice	3–1	4–0^{f}	7–1
2025–26	UEFA Women's Europa Cup	Round of 16	(Italy) Inter Milan	0–0	1–0^{f}	1–0
2025–26	UEFA Women's Europa Cup	Quarter-finals	(Iceland) Breiðablik	4–1	7–0^{f}	11–1
2025–26	UEFA Women's Europa Cup	Semi-finals	(Germany) Eintracht Frankfurt	3–0^{f}	0–1	3–1
2025–26	UEFA Women's Europa Cup	Final	(Sweden) Hammarby IF	1–0^{f}	3–2	4–2

^{f} First leg.
