= UEFA Women's Europa Cup =

- Organiser(s): UEFA
- Founded: 2025; 1 year ago
- Region: Europe
- Teams: 44
- Qualifier for: UEFA Women's Champions League
- Related competitions: UEFA Women's Champions League (1st tier)
- Current champions: (Sweden) BK Häcken (1st title)
- Most championships: (Sweden) BK Häcken (1 title)
- Website: Official website
- 2026–27 UEFA Women's Europa Cup

The UEFA Women's Europa Cup is a European women's association football competition organised by UEFA, the governing body of the sport for Europe. It serves as a secondary club competition below the UEFA Women's Champions League and runs concurrently to it. The first edition took place in the 2025–26 season.

Winners
Season	UEFA Women's Europa Cup
2025–26	(Sweden) BK Häcken
2026–27	

The winners of the UEFA Women's Europa Cup qualify for the third qualifying round (Champions Path) of the following season's UEFA Women's Champions League. Alternatively, they will qualify for the league phase (competition proper) should the Champions League title holders qualify for the league phase via their domestic league.

== Background ==
After several decades successfully running knock-out competitions for men's football clubs, the UEFA Women's Cup was created in 2001 to offer similar opportunities for women's clubs. The Women's Cup was renamed to the UEFA Women's Champions League in 2009 to match the styling of the men's tournament, and the tournament was expanded to include more clubs and more countries.

Following UEFA's expansion of men's competitions with the third-tier Europa Conference League playing its first season in 2021, proposals for a second-tier women's competition were submitted to offer a similar increase in scale to the women's game. On 4 December 2023 UEFA announced that it would act on these proposals with the creation of a new second-tier tournament which would commence from the 2025–26 season. The name of the competition was confirmed as the "UEFA Women's Europa Cup" on 16 December 2024.

== Format ==
Similarly to the UEFA Europa League in men's football, clubs can enter the tournament both by virtue of their league position in the previous season or by elimination from early stages of the same season's Champions League. It is a pure knock-out tournament with no group stage or league phase. Every round, up to and including the final, will be played as a two-legged home-and-away tie.

The tournament is be contested by 44 clubs in total – thirteen direct qualifiers from associations ranked 8–13 and 18–24 based on domestic league placement in the previous season plus thirty-one teams eliminated in the second and third qualifying rounds of the same season's Women's Champions League.

Provisional access list
	Teams entering in this round	Teams advancing from the previous round	Teams entering from the Champions League qualifying rounds
First qualifying round (24 teams)	7 runners-up from associations 18–24; 6 third-placed teams from associations 8–13		7 third-placed teams from the second round champions path mini-tournaments; 4 third-placed teams from the second round league path mini-tournaments
Second qualifying round (32 teams)		12 winners from the first qualifying round	7 runners-up from the second round champions path mini-tournaments; 4 runners-up from the second round league path mini-tournaments; 4 losers from the third round champions path; 5 losers from the third round league path
Round of 16 (16 teams)		16 winners from the second qualifying round	

Map of UEFA associations whose teams reached the group stage/league phase of the UEFA Women's Europa Cup UEFA member association that has been represented in the group main phase UEFA member association that has not been represented in the group main phase

Map of where UEFA associations whose teams reached the knockout phase of the UEFA Women's Europa Cup UEFA member association with winning clubs UEFA member association with runner-up clubs UEFA member association that has reached the semi-finals of the Europa Cup UEFA member association that has been represented in the quarter-finals of the Europa Cup UEFA member association that has been represented in the round of 16 of the Europa Cup UEFA member association that has been represented in the qualifying stages, but not the main stage of the Europa Cup UEFA member association that has not been represented in the qualifying/main stages of the Europa Cup Map will be updated as the tournament goes

== Records and statistics ==
=== Winners ===
Performances in the UEFA Women's Europa Cup
Club	Title(s)	Runners-up	Seasons won	Seasons runner-up
(Sweden) BK Häcken	1	0	2025–26	—
(Sweden) Hammarby IF	0	1	—	2025–26

=== By nation ===
Performances in finals by nation
Nation	Title(s)	Runners-up	Total
Sweden	1	1	2

=== Top scorers ===
Top Scorers per Season
Season	Player	Club	Goals
2025–26	(Sweden) Felicia Schröder	(Sweden) BK Häcken	8

== Appearances ==
=== By club ===
Appearances in the UEFA Women's Europa Cup by club
Club	Appearances	Best finish	Last appearance
(Netherlands) Ajax	2	Round of 16 (25/26)	2026–27
(Belgium) Anderlecht	1	Round of 16 (25/26)	2025–26
Austria Wien	1	Quarter-finals (25/26)	2025–26
(Sweden) BK Häcken	1	Winner (25/26)	2025–26
(Norway) Brann	1	TBD	2026–27
(Denmark) Brøndby	1	TBD	2026–27
(Iceland) Breiðablik	1	Quarter-finals (25/26)	2025–26
(Poland) Czarni Sosnowiec	1	TBD	2026–27
(Germany) Eintracht Frankfurt	2	Semi-finals (25/26)	2026–27
(Turkey) Fenerbahçe	1	TBD	2026–27
(Netherlands) Feyenoord	1	TBD	2026–27
(Denmark) Fortuna Hjørring	1	Round of 16 (25/26)	2025–26
(Scotland) Glasgow City	1	Round of 16 (25/26)	2025–26
(Sweden) Hammarby IF	2	Final (25/26)	2026–27
(Italy) Inter Milan	1	Round of 16 (25/26)	2025–26
(Sweden) Malmö FF	1	TBD	2026–27
(Slovenia) Mura	1	Round of 16 (25/26)	2025–26
(Denmark) Nordsjælland	1	Quarter-finals (25/26)	2025–26
(Netherlands) PSV Eindhoven	2	Round of 16 (25/26)	2026–27
(Spain) Real Sociedad	1	TBD	2026–27
(Norway) Rosenborg	1	TBD	2026–27
(Czech Republic) Sparta Prague	2	Semi-finals (25/26)	2026–27
(Slovakia) Spartak Myjava	1	TBD	2026–27
(Portugal) Sporting CP	1	Quarter-finals (25/26)	2025–26
(Portugal) Torreense	1	TBD	2026–27
(Germany) VfL Wolfsburg	1	TBD	2026–27
(Switzerland) Young Boys	1	Round of 16 (25/26)	2025–26

=== By nation ===
Appearances in the UEFA Women's Europa Cup by nation
Nation	Appearances	Best finish	Last appearance
Austria	1	Quarter-finals (25/26)	2025–26
Belgium	1	Round of 16 (25/26)	2025–26
Czechia	2	Semi-finals (25/26)	2026–27
Denmark	2	Quarter-finals (25/26)	2026–27
Germany	2	Semi-finals (25/26)	2026–27
Iceland	1	Quarter-finals (25/26)	2025–26
Italy	1	Round of 16 (25/26)	2025–26
Netherlands	2	Round of 16 (25/26)	2026–27
Norway	1	TBD	2026–27
Poland	1	TBD	2026–27
Portugal	2	Quarter-finals (25/26)	2026–27
Scotland	1	Round of 16 (25/26)	2025–26
Slovakia	1	TBD	2026–27
Slovenia	1	Round of 16 (25/26)	2025–26
Spain	1	TBD	2026–27
Sweden	2	Winner (25/26)	2026–27
Switzerland	1	Round of 16 (25/26)	2025–26
Turkey	1	TBD	2026–27

== See also ==
- UEFA Women's Champions League
- UEFA Europa League
