= 2025–26 UEFA Women's Europa Cup qualifying rounds =

Football tournament qualification stage

The 2025–26 UEFA Women's Europa Cup qualifying rounds began on 10 September and ended on 16 October 2025.

A total of 43 teams competed in the group stage qualifying rounds of the 2025–26 UEFA Women's Europa Cup, which included two rounds, with 18 teams in the Champions Path and 25 teams in the League Path. The 16 winners in the second round advanced to the knockout phase.

Times are CEST (UTC+2), as listed by UEFA (local times, if different, are in parentheses).

== Teams ==
The qualifying stage consisted of the following rounds:

- First qualifying round (22 teams): 11 teams which entered in this round, 7 third-placed teams from the Women's Champions League second qualifying round champions path mini-tournaments, and 4 third-placed teams from the Women's Champions League second qualifying round league path mini-tournaments.
- Second qualifying round (32 teams): 1 team which entered in this round, 11 winners of the first qualifying round, 7 runners-up from the Women's Champions League second qualifying round champions path mini-tournaments, 4 runners-up from the Women's Champions League second qualifying round league path mini-tournaments, 4 losers from the Women's Champions League third qualifying round champions path and 5 losers from the Women's Champions League third qualifying round league path.

Below are the participating teams (with their 2025 UEFA club coefficients), grouped by the starting rounds.

Key to colours
Winners of the second round advanced to knockout phase

Second round
Team	Coeff.
(Sweden) BK Häcken	28.000
(Czech Republic) Slavia Prague	24.000
(Sweden) Rosengård	24.000
(Czech Republic) Sparta Prague	21.000
(Norway) Brann	17.000
(Ukraine) Vorskla Poltava	14.000
(Germany) Eintracht Frankfurt	12.500
(Slovenia) Mura	11.000
(Belarus) FC Minsk	10.500
(Lithuania) Gintra	9.000
(Hungary) Ferencváros	9.000
(Denmark) Fortuna Hjørring	9.000
(Iceland) Breiðablik	8.500
(Sweden) Hammarby IF	8.000
(Belarus) Dinamo Minsk	7.000
(Portugal) Sporting CP	6.600
(Portugal) Braga	6.600
Austria Wien	4.150
(Czech Republic) Slovácko	3.866
(Switzerland) Young Boys	2.850
(Poland) GKS Katowice	1.800

First round
Team	Coeff.
(Netherlands) Ajax	21.000
(Kazakhstan) BIIK Shymkent	13.500
(Albania) Vllaznia	13.000
(Belgium) Anderlecht	11.000
(Bosnia and Herzegovina) SFK 2000	10.000
(Serbia) Spartak Subotica	10.000
(Scotland) Glasgow City	10.000
(Denmark) HB Køge	8.500
(Italy) Inter Milan	7.600
(Norway) Rosenborg	7.000
(Finland) KuPS	6.500
(Netherlands) PSV Eindhoven	5.000
(Austria) Sturm Graz	4.150
(Ukraine) Kolos Kovalivka	3.800
(Denmark) Nordsjælland	2.950
(Switzerland) Grasshopper	2.850
(Albania) Partizani	2.600
(Scotland) Hibernian	2.400
(Cyprus) Aris Limassol	2.400
(Romania) Farul Constanța	2.000
(Turkey) ABB Fomget	1.900
(Republic of Ireland) Athlone Town	1.600

Notes

1. ^{CH Q3} Losers of Champions League third qualifying round (Champions Path).
2. ^{CH Q2 RU} Runners-up of Champions League second qualifying round (Champions Path).
3. ^{CH Q2 TP} Third place of Champions League second qualifying round (Champions Path).
4. ^{LP Q3} Losers of Champions League third qualifying round (League Path).
5. ^{LP Q2 RU} Runners-up of Champions League second qualifying round (League Path).
6. ^{LP Q2 TP} Third place of Champions League second qualifying round (League Path).

== Schedule ==
The schedule of the competition was as follows.

Schedule for 2025–26 UEFA Women's Europa Cup qualifying rounds
Round	Draw date	First leg	Second leg
First qualifying round	31 August 2025	10–11 September 2025	17–18 September 2025
Second qualifying round	19 September 2025	7–8 October 2025	15–16 October 2025

== First qualifying round ==
The first qualifying round consisted of 22 teams who were divided into two pots of 11 seeded teams and 11 unseeded teams according to the club coefficient rankings established at the start of the season. Clubs from the same association could not be drawn against each other. A draw determined pairings and which team played the first leg at home. The draw was held on 31 August 2025.

=== Seeding ===
Seeded	Unseeded
(Netherlands) Ajax; (Kazakhstan) BIIK Shymkent; (Albania) Vllaznia; (Belgium) Anderlecht; (Bosnia and Herzegovina) SFK 2000; (Serbia) Spartak Subotica; (Scotland) Glasgow City; (Denmark) HB Køge; (Italy) Inter Milan; (Norway) Rosenborg; (Finland) KuPS	(Netherlands) PSV Eindhoven; (Austria) Sturm Graz; (Ukraine) Kolos Kovalivka; (Denmark) Nordsjælland; (Switzerland) Grasshopper; (Albania) Partizani; (Scotland) Hibernian; (Cyprus) Aris Limassol; (Romania) Farul Constanța; (Turkey) ABB Fomget; (Republic of Ireland) Athlone Town

=== Summary ===
The first legs were played on 10 and 11 September, and the second legs on 17 and 18 September 2025.

The winners of the ties advanced to the second qualifying round.

First qualifying round
Team 1	Agg.	Team 2	1st leg	2nd leg
Glasgow City (Scotland)	6–0	(Republic of Ireland) Athlone Town	3–0	3–0
Grasshopper (Switzerland)	5–1	(Kazakhstan) BIIK Shymkent	2–0	3–1
HB Køge (Denmark)	6–2	(Romania) Farul Constanța	3–2	3–0
Nordsjælland (Denmark)	8–2	(Finland) KuPS	3–1	5–1
Ajax (Netherlands)	4–0	(Austria) Sturm Graz	2–0	2–0
Aris Limassol (Cyprus)	0–14	(Belgium) Anderlecht	0–5	0–9
Vllaznia (Albania)	4–0	(Ukraine) Kolos Kovalivka	2–0	2–0
Rosenborg (Norway)	3–4	(Netherlands) PSV Eindhoven	3–0	0–4
SFK 2000 (Bosnia and Herzegovina)	3–3 (3–2 p)	(Turkey) ABB Fomget	0–0	3–3 (a.e.t.)
Inter Milan (Italy)	5–1	(Scotland) Hibernian	4–1	1–0
Partizani (Albania)	0–8	(Serbia) Spartak Subotica	0–5	0–3

=== Matches ===
10 September 2025
20:35 (19:35 UTC+1)

Glasgow City (Scotland)	3–0	(Republic of Ireland) Athlone Town
Anderson 15'; Motlhalo 55'; Forrest 60'	Report

Petershill Park, Glasgow
Attendance: 492
Referee: Tjaša Misja (Slovenia)
17 September 2025
20:30 (19:30 UTC+1)

Athlone Town (Republic of Ireland)	0–3	(Scotland) Glasgow City
	Report	Whelan 33'; Kozlova 80', 82'

Athlone Town Stadium, Athlone
Attendance: 1,369
Referee: Karoline Wacker (Germany)

Glasgow City won 6–0 on aggregate.

10 September 2025
19:00

Grasshopper (Switzerland)	2–0	(Kazakhstan) BIIK Shymkent
J. Egli 12', 48'	Report

Stadion Letzigrund, Zurich
Attendance: 702
Referee: Louise Thompson (Northern Ireland)
18 September 2025
08:00 (11:00 UTC+5)

BIIK Shymkent (Kazakhstan)	1–3	(Switzerland) Grasshopper
Gabelia 37'	Report	Rogers 10' (o.g.); Cazalla 19' (pen.); McKenna 57'

Namys Stadium, Shymkent
Attendance: 120
Referee: Minka Vekkeli (Finland)

Grasshopper won 5–1 on aggregate.

10 September 2025
16:00

HB Køge (Denmark)	3–2	(Romania) Farul Constanța
Gejl 1'; Pelkowski 57'; Luplau 90+1'	Report	Botojel 11' (pen.); Pînzariu 61'

Køge Stadium, Køge
Attendance: 548
Referee: Eszter Urban (Hungary)
17 September 2025
14:00 (15:00 UTC+3)

Farul Constanța (Romania)	0–3	(Denmark) HB Køge
	Report	Madsen 2'; Jereko 53'; Luplau 63'

Central Stadium Hagi Academy, Ovidiu
Attendance: 426
Referee: Eleni Antoniou (Greece)

HB Køge won 6–2 on aggregate.

10 September 2025
18:00

Nordsjælland (Denmark)	3–1	(Finland) KuPS
Gamede 54'; Walter 75'; El Behery 85'	Report	Kröger 48'

Right to Dream Park, Farum
Attendance: 558
Referee: Lorraine Watson (Scotland)
17 September 2025
17:00 (18:00 UTC+3)

KuPS (Finland)	1–5	(Denmark) Nordsjælland
Rochi 3'	Report	Larsen 15'; Wisnewski 41'; Walter 56'; El Behery 81'; Østersø 90'

Kuopion Keskuskenttä, Kuopio
Attendance: 457
Referee: Rasa Grigonė (Lithuania)

Nordsjælland won 8–2 on aggregate.

11 September 2025
19:30

Ajax (Netherlands)	2–0	(Austria) Sturm Graz
Noordman 69'; Van Koppen 90'	Report

De Toekomst, Amsterdam
Attendance: 587
Referee: Milica Milovanović (Serbia)
18 September 2025
15:30

Sturm Graz (Austria)	0–2	(Netherlands) Ajax
	Report	Tolhoek 52'; Van Egmond 63'

Anton Koch Stadion, Bad Schwanberg
Attendance: 580
Referee: Lina Lehtovaara (Finland)

Ajax won 4–0 on aggregate.

11 September 2025
18:00 (19:00 UTC+3)

Aris Limassol (Cyprus)	0–5	(Belgium) Anderlecht
	Report	Delabre 16'; Cardia 27'; Kristjánsdóttir 33'; Jonušaitė 56'; Baert 77'

Antonis Papadopoulos Stadium, Larnaca
Attendance: 289
Referee: Laura Mauricio (Switzerland)
17 September 2025
19:00

Anderlecht (Belgium)	9–0	(Cyprus) Aris Limassol
Cardia 1', 35', 75', 77'; IJzerman 18'; Jonušaitė 44'; Delabre 45+1' (pen.); Kristjánsdóttir 73', 83'	Report

Burg. Van De Wielestadion, Deinze
Attendance: 162
Referee: Catarina Campos (Portugal)

Anderlecht won 14–0 on aggregate.

11 September 2025
18:00

Vllaznia (Albania)	2–0	(Ukraine) Kolos Kovalivka
Doçi 14'; Solomakha 45' (o.g.)	Report

Loro Boriçi Stadium, Shkodër
Attendance: 780
Referee: Nanna Løf Andersen (Denmark)
17 September 2025
18:00

Kolos Kovalivka (Ukraine)	0–2	(Albania) Vllaznia
	Report	Doçi 63'; Deda 87'

Loro Boriçi Stadium, Shkodër, Albania (Note: Due to the Russian invasion of Ukraine, Ukrainian teams were required to play their home matches at neutral venues until further notice.)
Attendance: 535
Referee: Aleksandra Česen (Slovenia)

Vllaznia won 4–0 on aggregate.

10 September 2025
18:00

Rosenborg (Norway)	3–0	(Netherlands) PSV Eindhoven
Holum 15'; Berre 63'; Fuglem 75'	Report

Koteng Arena, Trondheim
Attendance: 617
Referee: María Eugenia Gil Soriano (Spain)
17 September 2025
19:00

PSV Eindhoven (Netherlands)	4–0	(Norway) Rosenborg
Ripa 4'; Jansen 40'; Nijstad 47'; Xhemaili 65'	Report

De Herdgang, Eindhoven
Attendance: 812
Referee: Jana Adámková (Czech Republic)

PSV Eindhoven won 4–3 on aggregate.

10 September 2025
18:00

SFK 2000 (Bosnia and Herzegovina)	0–0	(Turkey) ABB Fomget
	Report

Stadion Koševo, Sarajevo
Attendance: 357
Referee: Martina Molinaro (Italy)
18 September 2025
18:00 (19:00 UTC+3)

ABB Fomget (Turkey)	3–3 (a.e.t.)	(Bosnia and Herzegovina) SFK 2000
Kuč 11', 66', 100'	Report	Kršo 17'; Baidoe 34' (pen.); Terzić 105+2'
Penalties
Rangel (penalty scored); Abideen (penalty scored); Ovdiychuk (penalty missed); Smaili (penalty missed); Içinözbebek (penalty missed)	2–3	(penalty scored) Terzić; (penalty scored) Kamerić; (penalty scored) Čađenović; (penalty missed) Gavrić

Eryaman Stadium, Ankara
Attendance: 7,600
Referee: Maïka Vanderstichel (France)

3–3 on aggregate; SFK 2000 won 3–2 on penalties.

10 September 2025
20:00

Inter Milan (Italy)	4–1	(Scotland) Hibernian
Bugeja 4'; Schough 10'; Polli 46'; Glionna 81'	Report	Adams 67'

Youth Development Training Center, Milan
Attendance: 327
Referee: Caroline Lanssens (Belgium)
17 September 2025
20:00 (19:00 UTC+1)

Hibernian (Scotland)	0–1	(Italy) Inter Milan
	Report	Tomašević 90+2'

Easter Road Stadium, Edinburgh
Attendance: 1,606
Referee: Riem Hussein (Germany)

Inter Milan won 5–1 on aggregate.

10 September 2025
15:00

Partizani (Albania)	0–5	(Serbia) Spartak Subotica
	Report	Smith 1', 28', 82'; Vranić 36'; Kim 89'

Niko Dovana Stadium, Durrës
Attendance: 200
Referee: Voĺha Blockaja (Belarus)
17 September 2025
18:00

Spartak Subotica (Serbia)	3–0	(Albania) Partizani
Stupar 12'; Smith 63', 88'	Report

Gradski stadion, Subotica
Attendance: 247
Referee: Kristina Georgieva (Bulgaria)

Spartak Subotica won 8–0 on aggregate.

== Second qualifying round ==
The second qualifying round consisted of 32 teams who were divided into two pots of 16 seeded teams and 16 unseeded teams according to the club coefficient rankings established at the start of the season. Clubs from the same association could not be drawn against each other. A draw determined pairings and which team played the first leg at home. The draw was held on 19 September 2025.

=== Seeding ===
Seeded	Unseeded
(Sweden) BK Häcken; (Czech Republic) Slavia Prague; (Sweden) Rosengård; (Netherlands) Ajax; (Czech Republic) Sparta Prague; (Norway) Brann; (Ukraine) Vorskla Poltava; (Albania) Vllaznia; (Germany) Eintracht Frankfurt; (Belgium) Anderlecht; (Slovenia) Mura; (Belarus) FC Minsk; (Bosnia and Herzegovina) SFK 2000; (Serbia) Spartak Subotica; (Scotland) Glasgow City; (Lithuania) Gintra	(Hungary) Ferencváros; (Denmark) Fortuna Hjørring; (Iceland) Breiðablik; (Denmark) HB Køge; (Sweden) Hammarby IF; (Italy) Inter Milan; (Belarus) Dinamo Minsk; (Portugal) Sporting CP; (Portugal) Braga; (Netherlands) PSV Eindhoven; Austria Wien; (Czech Republic) Slovácko; (Denmark) Nordsjælland; (Switzerland) Young Boys; (Switzerland) Grasshopper; (Poland) GKS Katowice

=== Summary ===
The first legs were played on 7 and 8 October, and the second legs on 15 and 16 October 2025.

The winners of the ties advanced to the round of 16.

Second qualifying round
Team 1	Agg.	Team 2	1st leg	2nd leg
BK Häcken (Sweden)	7–1	(Poland) GKS Katowice	4–0	3–1
Sparta Prague (Czech Republic)	5–0	(Hungary) Ferencváros	0–0	5–0
Inter Milan (Italy)	12–0	(Albania) Vllaznia	7–0	5–0
Grasshopper (Switzerland)	1–2	(Netherlands) Ajax	0–0	1–2
Sporting CP (Portugal)	5–2	(Sweden) Rosengård	3–0	2–2
PSV Eindhoven (Netherlands)	2–0	(Belarus) FC Minsk		
Eintracht Frankfurt (Germany)	5–0	(Czech Republic) Slovácko	4–0	1–0
Vorskla Poltava (Ukraine)	1–2	(Denmark) Fortuna Hjørring	1–1	0–1
Breiðablik (Iceland)	5–1	(Serbia) Spartak Subotica	4–0	1–1
Gintra (Lithuania)	1–5	(Denmark) Nordsjælland	1–0	0–5
Anderlecht (Belgium)	4–3	(Portugal) Braga	1–1	3–2 (a.e.t.)
Young Boys (Switzerland)	3–0	(Bosnia and Herzegovina) SFK 2000	2–0	1–0
HB Køge (Denmark)	5–6	(Scotland) Glasgow City	2–1	3–5
Slavia Prague (Czech Republic)	3–3 (3–5 p)	Austria Wien	2–1	1–2 (a.e.t.)
Mura (Slovenia)	3–2	(Belarus) Dinamo Minsk	2–0	1–2
Hammarby IF (Sweden)	5–2	(Norway) Brann	4–1	1–1

=== Matches ===
7 October 2025
19:00

BK Häcken (Sweden)	4–0	(Poland) GKS Katowice
Sampaio 71', 81', 85'; Nyström 83'	Report

Bravida Arena, Gothenburg
Attendance: 1,025
Referee: Emanuela Rusta (Albania)
16 October 2025
18:00

GKS Katowice (Poland)	1–3	(Sweden) BK Häcken
Jaszek 24'	Report	Jusu Bah 17'; Nyström 40'; Zawadzka 73' (o.g.)

Arena Katowice, Katowice
Attendance: 548
Referee: Jelena Međedović (Serbia)

BK Häcken won 7–1 on aggregate.

8 October 2025
19:00

Sparta Prague (Czech Republic)	0–0	(Hungary) Ferencváros
	Report

Stadion Letná, Prague
Attendance: 603
Referee: Caroline Lanssens (Belgium)
16 October 2025
14:00

Ferencváros (Hungary)	0–5	(Czech Republic) Sparta Prague
	Report	Bergford 7'; Černá 19'; Bartoňová 47'; Frajtović 58' (o.g.); Huvarová 83'

Hévízi úti Stadion, Budapest
Attendance: 326
Referee: Merima Čelik (Bosnia and Herzegovina)

Sparta Prague won 5–0 on aggregate.

8 October 2025
18:00

Inter Milan (Italy)	7–0	(Albania) Vllaznia
Bajraktari 14' (o.g.); Wullaert 23', 41'; Detruyer 31'; Bugeja 57'; Polli 72', 86'	Report

Youth Development Training Center, Milan
Attendance: 246
Referee: Lotta Vuorio (Finland)
15 October 2025
18:00

Vllaznia (Albania)	0–5	(Italy) Inter Milan
	Report	Bugeja 8'; Polli 48'; Glionna 51'; Tomaselli 77' (pen.); Detruyer 81'

Loro Boriçi Stadium, Shkodër
Attendance: 800
Referee: Ana Maria Terteleac (Romania)

Inter Milan won 12–0 on aggregate.

8 October 2025
19:00

Grasshopper (Switzerland)	0–0	(Netherlands) Ajax
	Report

Letzigrund, Zurich
Attendance: 2,279
Referee: Olatz Rivera Olmedo (Spain)
16 October 2025
19:30

Ajax (Netherlands)	2–1	(Switzerland) Grasshopper
Van Asten 5'; Tolhoek 16'	Report	Arcangeli 89'

Sportpark De Toekomst, Duivendrecht
Attendance: 877
Referee: Aleksandra Česen (Slovenia)

Ajax won 2–1 on aggregate.

7 October 2025
20:45 (19:45 UTC+1)

Sporting CP (Portugal)	3–0	(Sweden) Rosengård
Haugen 39'; Santiago 60'; Bonsegundo 90+5'	Report

Stadium Aurelio Pereira, Alcochete
Attendance: 427
Referee: Franziska Wildfeuer (Germany)
15 October 2025
19:00

Rosengård (Sweden)	2–2	(Portugal) Sporting CP
Johansson 47'; Sjöström 62'	Report	Neto 29'; Santiago 57'

Malmö IP, Malmö
Attendance: 248
Referee: Jana Adámková (Czech Republic)

Sporting CP won 5–2 on aggregate.

16 October 2025
13:00

PSV Eindhoven (Netherlands)	2–0	(Belarus) FC Minsk
Jacobs 47'; Rijsbergen 90+2'	Report

House of Football, Tirana, Albania (Note: The players from FC Minsk did not receive visa to travel to the Netherlands, so UEFA decided to play the tie as a one-legged tie at a neutral venue.)
Attendance: 25
Referee: Louise Thompson (Northern Ireland)

8 October 2025
19:00

Eintracht Frankfurt (Germany)	4–0	(Czech Republic) Slovácko
Senß 3' (pen.); Freigang 15'; Lührßen 80'; Trčková 83' (o.g.)	Report

Stadion am Brentanobad, Frankfurt
Attendance: 2,153
Referee: Vanja Janković (Slovenia)
15 October 2025
19:00

Slovácko (Czech Republic)	0–1	(Germany) Eintracht Frankfurt
	Report	Ilestedt 45+1'

Městský fotbalový stadion Miroslava Valenty, Uherské Hradiště
Attendance: 1,216
Referee: Rasa Grigonė (Lithuania)

Eintracht Frankfurt won 5–0 on aggregate.

8 October 2025
18:00

Vorskla Poltava (Ukraine)	1–1	(Denmark) Fortuna Hjørring
Kravchuk 24'	Report	Hansen 31'

Hjørring Stadium, Hjørring, Denmark
Attendance: 270
Referee: Olivia Tschon (Austria)
15 October 2025
18:00

Fortuna Hjørring (Denmark)	1–0	(Ukraine) Vorskla Poltava
Ogochuckwu 14'	Report

Hjørring Stadium, Hjørring
Attendance: 220
Referee: Kristina Georgieva (Bulgaria)

Fortuna Hjørring won 2–1 on aggregate.

8 October 2025
20:00 (18:00 UTC+0)

Breiðablik (Iceland)	4–0	(Serbia) Spartak Subotica
Þorvaldsdóttir 8'; Albertsdóttir 11', 79'; Sigurðardóttir 90'	Report

Kópavogsvöllur, Kópavogur
Attendance: 207
Referee: Katalin Sipos (Hungary)
15 October 2025
17:00

Spartak Subotica (Serbia)	1–1	(Iceland) Breiðablik
Kim So-yi 54'	Report	Stupar 79' (o.g.)

Subotica City Stadium, Subotica
Attendance: 250
Referee: Réka Molnar (Hungary)

Breiðablik won 5–1 on aggregate.

7 October 2025
17:00 (18:00 UTC+3)

Gintra (Lithuania)	1–0	(Denmark) Nordsjælland
Spenazzatto 58'	Report

Savivaldybė Stadium, Šiauliai
Attendance: 420
Referee: Merima Čelik (Bosnia and Herzegovina)
15 October 2025
18:00

Nordsjælland (Denmark)	5–0	(Lithuania) Gintra
Larsen 2'; Antvorskov 19'; Walter 25'; El Behery 87'; Mikutaitė 90+2' (o.g.)	Report

Right to Dream Park, Farum
Attendance: 399
Referee: Deborah Anex (Switzerland)

Nordsjælland won 5–1 on aggregate.

8 October 2025
19:00

Anderlecht (Belgium)	1–1	(Portugal) Braga
Delabre 60' (pen.)	Report	Van de Ven 42'

Burgemeester Van de Wielestadion, Deinze
Attendance: 190
Referee: Abigail Byrne (England)
15 October 2025
21:00 (20:00 UTC+1)

Braga (Portugal)	2–3 (a.e.t.)	(Belgium) Anderlecht
Schmidt 18' (pen.); Vieira 95'	Report	Vanzeir 41'; Delabre 105+3', 120'

Estádio Amélia Morais, Braga
Attendance: 860
Referee: Maria Marotta (Italy)

Anderlecht won 4–3 on aggregate.

8 October 2025
14:00

Young Boys (Switzerland)	2–0	(Bosnia and Herzegovina) SFK 2000
Frey 29'; Chalatsogianni 83' (pen.)	Report

Stadion Wankdorf, Bern
Attendance: 1,690
Referee: Frida Klarlund (Denmark)
16 October 2025
18:00

SFK 2000 (Bosnia and Herzegovina)	0–1	(Switzerland) Young Boys
	Report	Josten 88'

Koševo City Stadium, Sarajevo
Attendance: 501
Referee: Deborah Bianchi (Italy)

Young Boys won 3–0 on aggregate.

8 October 2025
18:30

HB Køge (Denmark)	2–1	(Scotland) Glasgow City
Gejl 32'; Garcia 60'	Report	Anderson 41'

Køge Stadium, Køge
Attendance: 675
Referee: Riem Hussein (Germany)
15 October 2025
20:35 (19:35 UTC+1)

Glasgow City (Scotland)	5–3	(Denmark) HB Køge
Harrison 10'; Whelan 25'; Pelkowski 64' (o.g.); Brownlie 90'; Forrest 90+2'	Report	Gejl 3'; Nadim 27'; Thygesen 84'

Petershill Park, Glasgow
Attendance: 507
Referee: Maïka Vanderstichel (France)

Glasgow City won 6–5 on aggregate.

8 October 2025
15:00

Slavia Prague (Czech Republic)	2–1	Austria Wien
Cvrčková 10'; Morávková 70'	Report	Strode 90'

Sport Centre Radotín, Prague
Attendance: 337
Referee: Milica Milovanović (Serbia)
15 October 2025
19:45

Austria Wien	2–1 (a.e.t.)	(Czech Republic) Slavia Prague
Polcarová 6' (o.g.); Schiechtl 76'	Report	Cvrčková 87'
Penalties
Strode (penalty scored); Weilharter (penalty scored); Wenninger (penalty scored); Šišić (penalty scored); Uka (penalty scored)	5–3	(penalty scored) Bartovičová; (penalty scored) Dubcová; (penalty scored) Divišová; (penalty missed) Veselá

Franz Horr Stadium, Vienna
Attendance: 1,036
Referee: Nanna Løf Andersen (Denmark)

3–3 on aggregate; Austria Wien won 5–3 on penalties.

8 October 2025
18:00

Mura (Slovenia)	2–0	(Belarus) Dinamo Minsk
Vilčnik 15'; Dolinar 27'	Report

Fazanerija City Stadium, Murska Sobota
Attendance: 1,023
Referee: Anastasia Mylopoulou (Greece)
12 October 2025
15:00

Dinamo Minsk (Belarus)	2–1	(Slovenia) Mura
Artishevskaya 7'; Kapysha 22'	Report	Milović 63'

Fazanerija City Stadium, Murska Sobota, Slovenia (Note: Due to the country's involvement in the Russian invasion of Ukraine, Belarusian teams were required to play their home matches at neutral venues and behind closed doors until further notice.)
Attendance: 0
Referee: Marina Živković (Serbia)

Mura won 3–2 on aggregate.

7 October 2025
19:00

Hammarby IF (Sweden)	4–1	(Norway) Brann
Hasund 43'; Wangerheim 55', 56', 66'	Report	Davidson 78'

Grimsta IP, Bromma
Attendance: 800
Referee: Catarina Campos (Portugal)
16 October 2025
18:00

Brann (Norway)	1–1	(Sweden) Hammarby IF
Lovera 36'	Report	Blakstad 68'

Brann Stadion, Bergen
Attendance: 1,457
Referee: Désirée Grundbacher (Switzerland)

Hammarby IF won 5–2 on aggregate.
