= 2021–22 Birmingham City W.F.C. season =

Birmingham City
2021–22 season
- Head Coach: Scott Booth (until 18 November); Tony Elliott (interim, 18 November – 21 November); Darren Carter (interim, from 21 November)
- Stadium: St Andrew's, Birmingham
- FA WSL: 12th (relegated)
- FA Cup: Quarter-final
- League Cup: Group stage
- Top goalscorer: League: Louise Quinn (5 goals); All: Louise Quinn (6 goals)
- Highest home attendance: 1,429 (vs. Chelsea, 1 May)
- Lowest home attendance: 298 (vs. Reading, 7 November)
- Average home league attendance: 732
Home colours	Away colours	Third colours

The 2021–22 Birmingham City W.F.C. season was the club's 54th season in existence and their 11th in the FA Women's Super League, the highest level of the football pyramid, having been founding members of the league in 2011. Along with competing in the WSL, the club also contested two domestic cup competitions: the FA Cup and the League Cup.

Ahead of the 2021–22 season the team moved from Damson Park, where they had been based since 2014, to St Andrew's, the club's main stadium.

Manager Carla Ward resigned at the end of the previous campaign after only one season in charge having kept the team up with an 11th-place finish. Ward was replaced by Scott Booth who ended a six-year spell as manager of Glasgow City to take the role. Having only picked up one point from the opening seven league games and losing both League Cup games, Booth was sacked on 18 November 2021 after five months in charge. Tony Elliott took caretaker control for the WSL game against Chelsea on 21 November before Darren Carter was appointed interim manager later that day having left a coaching role at West Bromwich Albion to take the job.

On 4 May 2022, Birmingham City were relegated following a 6–0 defeat away at Manchester City with one game remaining. Members of the WSL since it was founded in 2011, it ended Birmingham's 20-year stint as a top-flight club having last been promoted as 2001–02 FA Women's Premier League Northern Division champions.

== Squad ==
As of 31 March 2022

Note: Flags indicate national team as defined under FIFA eligibility rules; some limited exceptions apply. Players may hold more than one non-FIFA nationality.

No.	Pos.	Nation	Player
1	GK	IRL	Marie Hourihan
2	DF	DEN	Cecilie Sandvej
3	DF	IRL	Harriet Scott
4	FW	IRL	Lucy Quinn
6	DF	ENG	Lily Simkin
7	FW	GRE	Veatriki Sarri
8	MF	SCO	Lisa Robertson (on loan from Celtic)
9	FW	SCO	Sarah Ewens
10	MF	SCO	Christie Murray
11	FW	ENG	Jade Pennock
12	FW	ENG	Libby Smith
14	MF	IRL	Jamie Finn
17	DF	IRL	Louise Quinn (captain)
19	FW	ENG	Lucy Whipp

No.	Pos.	Nation	Player
21	GK	ENG	Emily Ramsey (on loan from Manchester United)
22	FW	IRL	Eleanor Ryan-Doyle
23	FW	IRL	Emily Whelan
26	DF	ENG	Arabella Suttie
27	MF	ENG	Abbi Jenner
28	DF	ENG	Lucy Hepburn
29	GK	ENG	Lucy Jones
30	DF	ENG	Gemma Lawley
31	FW	ENG	Angelina Nixon
32	MF	ENG	Abi Cowie
34	MF	WAL	Sophie Phillips
36	FW	ENG	Louanne Worsey
37	DF	WAL	Taylor Reynolds
40	FW	ENG	Delphi Cole

== Preseason ==
15 August 2021 Friendly	Birmingham City	–	Coventry United	Kings Norton
				Stadium: Wast Hills Training Ground; Attendance: Behind-closed-doors
Note: No official scoreline released

22 August 2021 Friendly	Birmingham City	0–0	Liverpool	Birmingham
14:00				Stadium: St Andrew's; Attendance: Behind-closed-doors

28 August 2021 Friendly	Reading	–	Birmingham City	Reading
				Stadium: Madejski Stadium; Attendance: Behind-closed-doors
Note: No official scoreline released

== FA Women's Super League ==
=== Results summary ===
Overall								Home						Away					
Pld	W	D	L	GF	GA	GD	Pts	W	D	L	GF	GA	GD	W	D	L	GF	GA	GD
22	3	2	17	15	51	−36	11	1	1	9	5	20	−15	2	1	8	10	31	−21

Last updated: 8 May 2022.
Source: FA WSL

=== Results by matchday ===
Round	1	2	3	4	5	6	7	8	9	10	11	12	13	14	15	16	17	18	19	20	21	22
Ground	A	H	A	H	A	H	H	A	H	A	H	A	A	H	H	A	H	H	A	H	A	A
Result	L	L	L	L	D	L	L	L	L	L	W	L	L	L	L	L	L	D	W	L	L	W
Position	9	10	12	11	11	11	11	11	11	12	11	12	12	12	12	12	12	12	12	12	12	12

A = Away; H = Home; W = Win; D = Draw; L = Loss

=== Results ===
4 September 2021 1	Tottenham Hotspur	1–0	Birmingham City	Tottenham
15:00	Graham 40'	Report	Robertson (yellow card) 46'; Sarri (yellow card) 90+1'	Stadium: Tottenham Hotspur Stadium; Attendance: 4,681; Referee: Lisa Benn

12 September 2021 2	Birmingham City	0–5	Brighton & Hove Albion	Birmingham
14:00		Report	Williams 2'; Kaagman 45+1' (pen.); Carter 50'; Koivisto 58'; Green 70'; Symonds (yellow card) 80'; Simpkins (yellow card) 90+5'	Stadium: St Andrew's; Attendance: 525; Referee: Lucy May

25 September 2021 3	Everton	3–1	Birmingham City	Liverpool
11:30	Maier 13'; Bennison 73'; Sevecke 90+7'	Report	Pennock 32'	Stadium: Walton Hall Park; Attendance: 605; Referee: Helen Conley

3 October 2021 4	Birmingham City	0–2	Manchester United	Birmingham
18:45		Report	Staniforth (yellow card) 9'; Galton 27'; Groenen (yellow card) 63'; Toone 80'	Stadium: St Andrew's; Attendance: 650; Referee: Lisa Benn

10 October 2021 5	West Ham United	1–1	Birmingham City	Dagenham
14:00	Walker (yellow card) 7', (goal) 54'; Stringer (yellow card) 86'	Report	Lo. Quinn 67'	Stadium: Victoria Road; Attendance: 1,142; Referee: Amy Fearn

7 November 2021 6	Birmingham City	0–3	Reading	Birmingham
14:00	Robertson (yellow card) 76'	Report	Harding (yellow card) 43'; Dowie 48'; Rose 54', 71', (yellow card) 64'	Stadium: St Andrew's; Attendance: 298; Referee: Louise Saunders

14 November 2021 7	Birmingham City	0–1	Aston Villa	Birmingham
14:00	Sarri (yellow card) 75'; Robertson (yellow card) 90+1'	Report	Arthur (yellow card) 22'; Asante 25'; Lehmann (yellow card) 55'; Pacheco (yellow card) 90+3'	Stadium: St Andrew's; Attendance: 1,386; Referee: Kirsty Dowle

21 November 2021 8	Chelsea	5–0	Birmingham City	Kingston upon Thames
14:00	Kirby 4', 75'; Kerr 18', 29', 44'; Bright (yellow card) 84'	Report	Lawley (yellow card)	Stadium: Kingsmeadow; Attendance: 2,704; Referee: Elizabeth Simms

12 December 2021 9	Birmingham City	2–3	Manchester City	Birmingham
14:00	Murray 28' (pen.); Robertson (yellow card) 32'; Lo. Quinn 39'	Report	Stanway 34', (yellow card) 72'; Hemp 44'; White (yellow card) 45+3', (goal) 89'	Stadium: St Andrew's; Attendance: 812; Referee: Helen Conley

19 December 2021 10	Leicester City	2–0	Birmingham City	Leicester
14:00	Howard 18'; Tierney 74'; Plumptre (yellow card) 84'; de Graaf (yellow card) 90+2'	Report	Finn (yellow card) 36'	Stadium: King Power Stadium; Attendance: 2,124; Referee: Lisa Benn

9 January 2022 11	Birmingham City	2–0	Arsenal	Birmingham
14:00	Smith 3'; Sarri 42'; Scott (yellow card) 85'; Lu. Quinn (yellow card) 80'	Report	Iwabuchi (yellow card) 60'; Miedema (yellow card) 79'	Stadium: St Andrew's; Attendance: 532; Referee: Lucy May

15 January 2022 12	Manchester United	5–0	Birmingham City	Leigh
12:00	Zelem 12'; Galton 16', 18'; Ladd (yellow card) 25'; Ramsey 45' (o.g.); Russo 71'	Report		Stadium: Leigh Sports Village; Attendance: 1,015; Referee: Kirsty Dowle

23 January 2022 13	Reading	3–2	Birmingham City	Reading
14:00	Vanhaevermaet 45+4'; Dowie 48' (pen.); Harries 55'	Report	Lawley 3'; Pennock 36'	Stadium: Madejski Stadium; Attendance: 552; Referee: Lisa Benn

6 February 2022 14	Birmingham City	1–2	Leicester City	Birmingham
14:00	Ramsey (red card) 26'; Lo. Quinn 85'	Report	Sigsworth 29' (pen.), (yellow card) 90+5'; Purfield 37'	Stadium: St Andrew's; Attendance: 810; Referee: Louise Saunders

13 February 2022 15	Birmingham City	0–2	Tottenham Hotspur	Birmingham
14:00	Robertson (yellow card) 33'; Ramsey (yellow card) 86'	Report	Neville 66'; Percival 85'	Stadium: St Andrew's; Attendance: 487; Referee: Emily Heaslip

6 March 2022 16	Arsenal	4–2	Birmingham City	Borehamwood
12:00	Rafaelle 14'; Miedema 31'; Wälti (yellow card) 61'; Mead 71'; Wienroither (yellow card) 75'; Foord 90+2'	Report	Lawley (yellow card) 44'; Holloway (yellow card) 58'; Smith 76'; Lu. Quinn 82'	Stadium: Meadow Park; Attendance: 1,700; Referee: Richard Massey-Ellis

13 March 2022 17	Birmingham City	0–1	West Ham United	Birmingham
14:00		Report	Leon 41'; Stringer (yellow card) 45+10'; Yallop (yellow card) 88'; Longhurst (yellow card) 90+2'	Stadium: St Andrew's; Attendance: 587; Referee: Louise Saunders

27 March 2022	Manchester City	P–P	Birmingham City	Manchester
14:00				Stadium: Academy Stadium
Note: Postponed due to a COVID-19 outbreak at Birmingham

1 April 2022 18	Birmingham City	0–0	Everton	Birmingham
19:00	Smith (yellow card) 42'	Report	Christiansen (yellow card) 41'	Stadium: St Andrew's; Attendance: 537; Referee: Amy Fearn

23 April 2022 19	Brighton & Hove Albion	1–3	Birmingham City	Crawley
14:00	Kerkdijk (yellow card) 22'; Le Tissier (yellow card) 74'; Zigiotti Olme 84'	Report	Sarri 9'; Lo. Quinn 75', 88'; Smith (yellow card) 86'	Stadium: Broadfield Stadium; Attendance: 1,209; Referee: Elizabeth Simms

1 May 2022 20	Birmingham City	0–1	Chelsea	Birmingham
18:45	Cowie (yellow card) 35'; Robertson (yellow card) 43'; Scott (yellow card) 90+5'	Report	Harder 71' (pen.); Berger (yellow card) 90+4'	Stadium: St Andrew's; Attendance: 1,429; Referee: Emily Heaslip

4 May 2022 21	Manchester City	6–0	Birmingham City	Manchester
19:00	Stanway 58', 64'; Hemp 64'; Kennedy 76'; Kelly 83'; Coombs 87'	Report		Stadium: Academy Stadium; Attendance: 1,207; Referee: Kirsty Dowle
Note: Rescheduled from 27 March 2022

8 May 2022 22	Aston Villa	0–1	Birmingham City	Aston
12:00	Asante (yellow card) 45'	Report	Sarri 10'	Stadium: Villa Park; Attendance: 8,367; Referee: Rebecca Welch

=== League table ===
Pos	Team	Pld	W	D	L	GF	GA	GD	Pts	Qualification or relegation
8	Reading	22	7	4	11	21	40	−19	25	
9	Aston Villa	22	6	3	13	13	40	−27	21	
10	Everton	22	5	5	12	18	41	−23	20	
11	Leicester City	22	4	1	17	14	53	−39	13	
12	Birmingham City (R)	22	3	2	17	15	51	−36	11	Relegation to the Championship

Source: FA WSL
Rules for classification: 1) Points; 2) Goal difference; 3) Number of goals scored.
(R) Relegated

== Women's FA Cup ==
As a member of the first tier, Birmingham City entered the FA Cup in the fourth round proper.

30 January 2022 Fourth round	Birmingham City	2–1 (a.e.t.)	Sunderland	Birmingham
13:00	Sarri 28'; Scott (yellow card) 45+1'; Whipp 100'; Lawley (yellow card) 109'	Report	Ramshaw 86'; Manders (yellow card) 90+5'	Stadium: St Andrew's; Referee: Magda Golba

27 February 2022 Fifth round	Durham	0–1	Birmingham City	Durham
14:00	Hill (yellow card) 41'	Report	Lo. Quinn 78'	Stadium: Maiden Castle; Attendance: 593; Referee: Lucy May

20 March 2022 Quarter-final	Chelsea	5–0	Birmingham City	Kingston upon Thames
14:00	Eriksson 45'; Spence 55', (yellow card) 90'; England 62', 72'; Charles 65'	Report	Lo. Quinn (yellow card) 44'	Stadium: Kingsmeadow; Attendance: 1,869; Referee: Lucy May

== FA Women's League Cup ==
=== Group stage ===
13 October 2021 Group stage	Birmingham City	0–1	Brighton & Hove Albion	Birmingham
19:30	Lu. Quinn (yellow card) 80'	Report	Connolly 45'; Williams (yellow card) 60'	Stadium: St Andrew's; Referee: Lisa Benn

17 November 2021 Group stage	Birmingham City	0–4	West Ham United	Birmingham
19:30	Pennock (yellow card) 45+2'; Holloway (yellow card) 64'; Scott (yellow card) 81'	Report	Lo. Quinn 38' (o.g.); Walker 41', (yellow card) 58'; Parker 74'; Svitková 78'	Stadium: St Andrew's

15 December 2021 Group stage	London City Lionesses	2–2 (5–4 p)	Birmingham City	Dartford
19:00	Muya 39'; Rodgers 59'	Report	Whelan (yellow card) 69'; Ryan-Doyle 80', 88'	Stadium: Princes Park
	Penalties
	Rouse (penalty scored); Bennett (penalty missed); Thompson (penalty scored); Rossiter (penalty scored); Yanez (penalty scored); Napier (penalty scored)		(penalty scored) Ryan-Doyle; (penalty missed) Finn; (penalty scored) Whipp; (penalty scored) Lo. Quinn; (penalty scored) Ewens; (penalty missed) Lawley

Pos	Team	Pld	W	WPEN	LPEN	L	GF	GA	GD	Pts	Qualification	WHU	LCL	BHA	BIR
1	West Ham United	3	3	0	0	0	8	0	+8	9	Advances to knock-out stage	—	—	3–0	—
2	London City Lionesses	3	1	1	0	1	3	3	0	5	Possible knock-out stage based on ranking	0–1	—	—	2–2
3	Brighton & Hove Albion	3	1	0	0	2	1	4	−3	3		—	0–1	—	—
4	Birmingham City	3	0	0	1	2	2	7	−5	1		0–4	—	0–1	—

Source: thefa.com
Rules for classification: 1) Points; 2) Goal difference; 3) Number of goals scored; 4) Number of wins; 5) Head-to-head record

== Squad statistics ==
=== Appearances ===
As of 8 May 2022

Starting appearances are listed first, followed by substitute appearances after the + symbol where applicable.

No.	Pos	Nat	Player	Total		FA WSL		FA Cup		League Cup	
No.	Pos	Nat	Player	Apps	Goals	Apps	Goals	Apps	Goals	Apps	Goals
1	GK	(Republic of Ireland) IRL	Marie Hourihan	11	0	7	0	2	0	2	0
2	DF	(Denmark) DEN	Cecilie Sandvej	6	0	5	0	0	0	1	0
3	DF	(Republic of Ireland) IRL	Harriet Scott	24	0	20	0	2	0	1+1	0
4	DF	(Republic of Ireland) IRL	Louise Quinn	27	6	22	5	3	1	2	0
6	DF	(England) ENG	Lily Simkin	0	0	0	0	0	0	0	0
7	FW	(Greece) GRE	Veatriki Sarri	26	4	19+2	3	3	1	1+1	0
8	MF	(Scotland) SCO	Lisa Robertson	22	0	16	0	3	0	3	0
9	FW	(Scotland) SCO	Sarah Ewens	15	0	4+7	0	2	0	1+1	0
10	MF	(Scotland) SCO	Christie Murray	21	1	17	1	3	0	1	0
11	FW	(England) ENG	Jade Pennock	23	2	17+2	2	1+1	0	2	0
12	FW	(England) ENG	Libby Smith	25	2	14+6	2	2+1	0	0+2	0
14	MF	(Republic of Ireland) IRL	Jamie Finn	26	0	18+2	0	2+1	0	3	0
17	FW	(Republic of Ireland) IRL	Lucy Quinn	28	1	19+3	1	2+1	0	3	0
19	MF	(England) ENG	Lucy Whipp	15	1	4+7	0	0+1	1	2+1	0
21	GK	(England) ENG	Emily Ramsey	17	0	15	0	1	0	1	0
22	FW	(Republic of Ireland) IRL	Eleanor Ryan-Doyle	16	2	3+9	0	1+1	0	1+1	2
23	FW	(Republic of Ireland) IRL	Emily Whelan	24	0	3+16	0	1+1	0	1+2	0
26	DF	(England) ENG	Arabella Suttie	1	0	0+1	0	0	0	0	0
27	MF	(England) ENG	Abbi Jenner	2	0	0	0	0+1	0	0+1	0
28	DF	(England) ENG	Lucy Hepburn	0	0	0	0	0	0	0	0
29	GK	(England) ENG	Lucy Jones	1	0	0+1	0	0	0	0	0
30	DF	(England) ENG	Gemma Lawley	25	1	18+1	1	3	0	3	0
31	FW	(England) ENG	Angelina Nixon	0	0	0	0	0	0	0	0
32	MF	(England) ENG	Abi Cowie	9	0	5+2	0	1	0	1	0
34	MF	(Wales) WAL	Sophie Phillips	0	0	0	0	0	0	0	0
36	FW	(England) ENG	Louanne Worsey	5	0	0+3	0	0+1	0	1	0
37	DF	(Wales) WAL	Taylor Reynolds	1	0	0	0	0	0	1	0
40	FW	(England) ENG	Delphi Cole	1	0	0	0	0+1	0	0	0
Players who appeared for the club but left during the season:
25	DF	(Northern Ireland) NIR	Rebecca Holloway	21	0	16+1	0	1+1	0	2	0

== Transfers ==
=== Transfers in ===
Date	Position	Nationality	Name	From	Ref.
17 July 2021	FW	(England)	Jade Pennock	(England) Sheffield United	
23 July 2021	DF	(Republic of Ireland)	Louise Quinn	(Italy) Fiorentina	
27 July 2021	FW	(Scotland)	Sarah Ewens	(Scotland) Celtic	
27 July 2021	FW	(Republic of Ireland)	Lucy Quinn	(England) Tottenham Hotspur	
28 July 2021	FW	(England)	Libby Smith	(England) Leicester City	
4 August 2021	DF	(Denmark)	Cecilie Sandvej	(France) FC Fleury 91	
27 August 2021	MF	(Republic of Ireland)	Jamie Finn	(Republic of Ireland) Shelbourne	
28 August 2021	GK	(Republic of Ireland)	Marie Hourihan	(Portugal) Braga	
2 September 2021	DF	(England)	Arabella Suttie	(England) Chelsea	
3 September 2021	FW	(Republic of Ireland)	Eleanor Ryan-Doyle	(Republic of Ireland) Peamount United	
3 September 2021	FW	(Republic of Ireland)	Emily Whelan	(Republic of Ireland) Shelbourne	

=== Loans in ===
Date	Position	Nationality	Name	To	Until	Ref.
6 August 2021	GK	(England)	Emily Ramsey	(England) Manchester United	30 June 2022	
6 August 2021	MF	(Scotland)	Lisa Robertson	(Scotland) Celtic	30 June 2022	

=== Transfers out ===
Date	Position	Nationality	Name	To	Ref.
15 June 2021	MF	(England)	Heidi Logan	(England) Lewes	
26 June 2021	GK	(England)	Hannah Hampton	(England) Aston Villa	
29 June 2021	MF	(England)	Sarah Mayling	(England) Aston Villa	
30 June 2021	MF	(England)	Ella Powell	(England) Loughborough Lightning	
1 July 2021	FW	(England)	Claudia Walker	(England) West Ham United	
1 July 2021	MF	(England)	Mollie Green	(England) Coventry United	
16 July 2021	FW	(Scotland)	Abbi Grant	(England) Leicester City	
27 July 2021	FW	(England)	Emma Kelly	(England) Sunderland	
6 August 2021	GK	(England)	Sophie Whitehouse	(England) Bristol City	
19 August 2021	MF	(England)	Connie Scofield	(England) Leicester City	
23 August 2021	FW	(Republic of Ireland)	Ruesha Littlejohn	(England) Aston Villa	
31 March 2022	DF	(Northern Ireland)	Rebecca Holloway	(United States) Racing Louisville	
