= 2025–26 UEFA Women's Europa Cup =

Tournament details
- Dates: Qualifying: 10 September – 16 October 2025; Competition proper: 12 November 2025 – 1 May 2026
- Teams: Competition proper: 16; Total: 43 (from 28 associations)

Final positions
- Champions: (Sweden) BK Häcken (1st title)
- Runners-up: (Sweden) Hammarby IF

Tournament statistics
- Matches played: 30
- Goals scored: 89 (2.97 per match)
- Attendance: 64,813 (2,160 per match)
- Top scorer(s): Felicia Schröder (BK Häcken); 8 goals

The 2025–26 UEFA Women's Europa Cup was the inaugural season of the UEFA Women's Europa Cup, Europe's secondary women's club football tournament organised by UEFA. The competition featured a straight knockout format, with every round (including the final) played as a two-legged home-and-away tie.

The final was played between BK Häcken and Hammarby IF. BK Häcken won 4–2 on aggregate. As winners, they qualified for the league phase of the 2026–27 UEFA Women's Champions League.

== Association team allocation ==
The association ranking based on the UEFA women's country coefficients was used to determine the number of participating teams for each association:

- Associations 8–13 and 18–24 (excluding Russia) each had one team qualify directly.
- 31 teams eliminated from the 2025–26 Women's Champions League qualifying rounds were transferred to the Europa Cup.

An association had to have an eleven-a-side women's domestic league to enter a team. As of 2019–20, 52 of the 55 UEFA member associations organized women's domestic leagues, with the exceptions being Andorra (1 club in Spain), Liechtenstein (3 clubs in Switzerland) and San Marino (1 club in Italy).

=== Association ranking ===
For the 2025–26 UEFA Women's Europa Cup, the associations were allocated places according to their 2024 UEFA women's association coefficients, which took into account their performance in European competitions from 2019–20 to 2023–24.

Apart from the allocation based on the association coefficients, associations could have additional teams participating in the Europa Cup, as noted below:

- (UCL) – Additional teams transferred from the UEFA Women's Champions League

Association ranking for 2025–26 UEFA Women's Europa Cup

Rank	Association	Coeff.	Teams	Notes
1	France	78.333	0	
2	Germany	68.999	0	+1 (UCL)
3	Spain	68.166	0	
4	England	59.999	0	
5	Portugal	34.000	0	+2 (UCL)
6	Italy	34.000	0	+1 (UCL)
7	Sweden	24.999	0	+3 (UCL)
8	Czech Republic	22.332	1	+2 (UCL)
9	Netherlands	22.000	1	+1 (UCL)
10	Denmark	21.750	1	+2 (UCL)
11	Norway	21.500	1	+1 (UCL)
12	Austria	21.250	1	+1 (UCL)
13	Ukraine	19.000	1	+1 (UCL)
14	Belarus	18.000	0	+2 (UCL)
15	Iceland	17.750	0	+1 (UCL)
16	Scotland	17.000	0	+2 (UCL)
17	Kazakhstan	14.750	0	+1 (UCL)
18	Switzerland	14.250	1	+1 (UCL)
19	Serbia	14.000	1	

Rank	Association	Coeff.	Teams	Notes
20	Albania	14.000	1	+1 (UCL)
21	Cyprus	12.000	1	
22	Belgium	12.000	1	
23	Russia	10.250	0	
24	Finland	10.000	1	
25	Bosnia and Herzegovina	10.000	0	+1 (UCL)
26	Hungary	9.500	0	+1 (UCL)
27	Romania	9.000	0	+1 (UCL)
28	Slovenia	9.000	0	+1 (UCL)
29	Poland	9.000	0	+1 (UCL)
30	Croatia	8.500	0	
31	Lithuania	8.500	0	+1 (UCL)
32	Republic of Ireland	8.000	0	+1 (UCL)
33	Kosovo	8.000	0	
34	Turkey	7.500	0	+1 (UCL)
35	Greece	7.000	0	
36	Israel	7.000	0	
37	Georgia	7.000	0	

Rank	Association	Coeff.	Teams	Notes
38	Montenegro	7.000	0	
39	Slovakia	6.500	0	
40	Bulgaria	6.500	0	
41	Luxembourg	6.000	0	
42	Wales	6.000	0	
43	Estonia	5.500	0	
44	Northern Ireland	5.500	0	
45	Latvia	5.500	0	
46	Malta	5.500	0	
47	Moldova	4.500	0	
48	North Macedonia	4.000	0	
49	Faroe Islands	4.000	0	
50	Armenia	3.000	0	
NR	Azerbaijan	—	0	
NR	Gibraltar	—	0	DNE
NR	Andorra	—	0	NL
NR	Liechtenstein	—	0	NL
NR	San Marino	—	0	NL

=== Distribution ===
Access list for 2025–26 UEFA Women's Europa Cup
	Teams entering in this round	Teams advancing from the previous round	Teams entering from the Champions League qualifying rounds
First qualifying round (22 teams)	6 runners-up from associations 18–24 (except Russia); 5 third-placed teams from associations 9–13		7 third-placed teams from the second round champions path mini-tournaments; 4 third-placed teams from the second round league path mini-tournaments
Second qualifying round (32 teams)	1 third-placed teams from association 8	11 winners from the first qualifying round	7 runners-up from the second round champions path mini-tournaments; 4 runners-up from the second round league path mini-tournaments; 4 losers from the third round champions path; 5 losers from the third round league path
Round of 16 (16 teams)		16 winners from the second qualifying round	

=== Teams ===
The labels in the parentheses show how each team qualified for the place of its starting round:

- 2nd, 3rd: League position of the previous season
- CL: Transferred from the Women's Champions League
  - CH/LP Q3: Transferred from the third qualifying round (Champions/League Path)
  - CH/LP Q2: Transferred from the second qualifying round mini-tournaments (Champions/League Path)
    - RU: Runner-up of the mini-tournament
    - TP: Third place of the mini-tournament

Qualified teams for 2025–26 UEFA Women's Europa Cup
Entry round	Teams			
Second qualifying round	(Czech Republic) Slovácko (3rd)	(Denmark) Fortuna Hjørring (CL CH Q3)	(Ukraine) Vorskla Poltava (CL CH Q3)	(Hungary) Ferencváros (CL CH Q3)
Second qualifying round	(Poland) GKS Katowice (CL CH Q3)	(Germany) Eintracht Frankfurt (CL LP Q3)	(Portugal) Sporting CP (CL LP Q3)	(Sweden) BK Häcken (CL LP Q3)
Second qualifying round	(Norway) Brann (CL LP Q3)	Austria Wien (CL LP Q3)	(Sweden) Rosengård (CL CH Q2 RU)	(Czech Republic) Slavia Prague (CL CH Q2 RU)
Second qualifying round	(Belarus) Dinamo Minsk (CL CH Q2 RU)	(Iceland) Breiðablik (CL CH Q2 RU)	(Switzerland) Young Boys (CL CH Q2 RU)	(Slovenia) Mura (CL CH Q2 RU)
Second qualifying round	(Lithuania) Gintra (CL CH Q2 RU)	(Portugal) Braga (CL LP Q2 RU)	(Sweden) Hammarby IF (CL LP Q2 RU)	(Czech Republic) Sparta Prague (CL LP Q2 RU)
Second qualifying round	(Belarus) FC Minsk (CL LP Q2 RU)			
First qualifying round	(Netherlands) Ajax (3rd)	(Denmark) HB Køge (3rd)	(Norway) Rosenborg (3rd)	(Austria) Sturm Graz (3rd)
First qualifying round	(Ukraine) Kolos Kovalivka (3rd)	(Switzerland) Grasshopper (2nd)	(Serbia) Spartak Subotica (2nd)	(Albania) Partizani (2nd)
First qualifying round	(Cyprus) Aris Limassol (2nd)	(Belgium) Anderlecht (2nd)	(Finland) KuPS (2nd)	(Scotland) Hibernian (CL CH Q2 TP)
First qualifying round	(Kazakhstan) BIIK Shymkent (CL CH Q2 TP)	(Albania) Vllaznia (CL CH Q2 TP)	(Bosnia and Herzegovina) SFK 2000 (CL CH Q2 TP)	(Romania) Farul Constanța (CL CH Q2 TP)
First qualifying round	(Republic of Ireland) Athlone Town (CL CH Q2 TP)	(Turkey) ABB Fomget (CL CH Q2 TP)	(Italy) Inter Milan (CL LP Q2 TP)	(Netherlands) PSV Eindhoven (CL LP Q2 TP)
First qualifying round	(Denmark) Nordsjælland (CL LP Q2 TP)	(Scotland) Glasgow City (CL LP Q2 TP)		

Notes

1. Russia (RUS): On 28 February 2022, Russian football clubs and national teams were suspended from FIFA and UEFA competitions. The tables reflect Russia's ongoing suspension from UEFA competitions.

== Schedule ==
The schedule of the competition was as follows.

Schedule for 2025–26 UEFA Women's Europa Cup
Round	Draw date	First leg	Second leg
First qualifying round	31 August 2025	10–11 September 2025	17–18 September 2025
Second qualifying round	19 September 2025	7–8 October 2025	15–16 October 2025
Round of 16	17 October 2025	12 November 2025	19–20 November 2025
Quarter-finals	17 October 2025	11 February 2026	18 February 2026
Semi-finals	17 October 2025	25 March 2026	2 April 2026
Final	17 October 2025	25 April 2026	1 May 2026

== Qualifying rounds ==
=== First qualifying round ===
The first legs were played on 10 and 11 September, and the second legs on 17 and 18 September 2025.

The winners of the ties advanced to the second qualifying round.

First qualifying round
Team 1	Agg.	Team 2	1st leg	2nd leg
Glasgow City (Scotland)	6–0	(Republic of Ireland) Athlone Town	3–0	3–0
Grasshopper (Switzerland)	5–1	(Kazakhstan) BIIK Shymkent	2–0	3–1
HB Køge (Denmark)	6–2	(Romania) Farul Constanța	3–2	3–0
Nordsjælland (Denmark)	8–2	(Finland) KuPS	3–1	5–1
Ajax (Netherlands)	4–0	(Austria) Sturm Graz	2–0	2–0
Aris Limassol (Cyprus)	0–14	(Belgium) Anderlecht	0–5	0–9
Vllaznia (Albania)	4–0	(Ukraine) Kolos Kovalivka	2–0	2–0
Rosenborg (Norway)	3–4	(Netherlands) PSV Eindhoven	3–0	0–4
SFK 2000 (Bosnia and Herzegovina)	3–3 (3–2 p)	(Turkey) ABB Fomget	0–0	3–3 (a.e.t.)
Inter Milan (Italy)	5–1	(Scotland) Hibernian	4–1	1–0
Partizani (Albania)	0–8	(Serbia) Spartak Subotica	0–5	0–3

=== Second qualifying round ===
The first legs were played on 7 and 8 October, and the second legs on 15 and 16 October 2025.

The winners of the ties advanced to the round of 16.

Second qualifying round
Team 1	Agg.	Team 2	1st leg	2nd leg
BK Häcken (Sweden)	7–1	(Poland) GKS Katowice	4–0	3–1
Sparta Prague (Czech Republic)	5–0	(Hungary) Ferencváros	0–0	5–0
Inter Milan (Italy)	12–0	(Albania) Vllaznia	7–0	5–0
Grasshopper (Switzerland)	1–2	(Netherlands) Ajax	0–0	1–2
Sporting CP (Portugal)	5–2	(Sweden) Rosengård	3–0	2–2
PSV Eindhoven (Netherlands)	2–0	(Belarus) FC Minsk		
Eintracht Frankfurt (Germany)	5–0	(Czech Republic) Slovácko	4–0	1–0
Vorskla Poltava (Ukraine)	1–2	(Denmark) Fortuna Hjørring	1–1	0–1
Breiðablik (Iceland)	5–1	(Serbia) Spartak Subotica	4–0	1–1
Gintra (Lithuania)	1–5	(Denmark) Nordsjælland	1–0	0–5
Anderlecht (Belgium)	4–3	(Portugal) Braga	1–1	3–2 (a.e.t.)
Young Boys (Switzerland)	3–0	(Bosnia and Herzegovina) SFK 2000	2–0	1–0
HB Køge (Denmark)	5–6	(Scotland) Glasgow City	2–1	3–5
Slavia Prague (Czech Republic)	3–3 (3–5 p)	Austria Wien	2–1	1–2 (a.e.t.)
Mura (Slovenia)	3–2	(Belarus) Dinamo Minsk	2–0	1–2
Hammarby IF (Sweden)	5–2	(Norway) Brann	4–1	1–1

== Knockout phase ==
Location of teams of the 2025–26 UEFA Women's Europa Cup knockout phase

In the knockout phase, teams played against each other over two legs on a home-and-away basis. The bracket was predetermined and a draw was held on 17 October 2025 to place the 16 teams into positions in the bracket. Eight teams were seeded according to club coefficients and drawn to face the unseeded teams in the round of 16. Which club played the first leg at home for each tie of every round was also decided.

=== Bracket ===
Round of 16
(Czech Republic) Sparta Prague	0	4	4
(Switzerland) Young Boys	3	0	3
(Belgium) Anderlecht	0	1	1
Austria Wien	1	2	3
(Scotland) Glasgow City	1	1	2
(Portugal) Sporting CP (a.e.t.)	1	3	4
(Netherlands) Ajax	1	1	2
(Sweden) Hammarby IF	3	3	6
(Netherlands) PSV Eindhoven	1	1	2
(Germany) Eintracht Frankfurt	2	3	5
(Denmark) Nordsjælland	1	4	5
(Slovenia) Mura	0	0	0
(Sweden) BK Häcken	1	0	1
(Italy) Inter Milan	0	0	0
(Iceland) Breiðablik (a.e.t.)	0	4	4
(Denmark) Fortuna Hjørring	1	2	3

Quarter-finals
(Czech Republic) Sparta Prague (a.e.t.)	0	3	3
Austria Wien	0	1	1
(Portugal) Sporting CP	0	1	1 (4)
(Sweden) Hammarby IF (p)	1	0	1 (5)
(Germany) Eintracht Frankfurt	4	3	7
(Denmark) Nordsjælland	0	2	2
(Sweden) BK Häcken	7	4	11
(Iceland) Breiðablik	0	1	1

Semi-finals
(Czech Republic) Sparta Prague	2	0	2
(Sweden) Hammarby IF	3	2	5
(Germany) Eintracht Frankfurt	0	1	1
(Sweden) BK Häcken	3	0	3

Final
(Sweden) Hammarby IF	0	2	2
(Sweden) BK Häcken	1	3	4

=== Round of 16 ===
The draw for the round of 16 was held on 17 October 2025. The first legs were played on 12 November, and the second legs on 19 and 20 November 2025.

Round of 16
Team 1	Agg.	Team 2	1st leg	2nd leg
Ajax (Netherlands)	2–6	(Sweden) Hammarby IF	1–3	1–3
Glasgow City (Scotland)	2–4	(Portugal) Sporting CP	1–1	1–3 (a.e.t.)
Anderlecht (Belgium)	1–3	Austria Wien	0–1	1–2
Sparta Prague (Czech Republic)	4–3	(Switzerland) Young Boys	0–3	4–0
BK Häcken (Sweden)	1–0	(Italy) Inter Milan	1–0	0–0
Breiðablik (Iceland)	4–3	(Denmark) Fortuna Hjørring	0–1	4–2 (a.e.t.)
Nordsjælland (Denmark)	5–0	(Slovenia) Mura	1–0	4–0
PSV Eindhoven (Netherlands)	2–5	(Germany) Eintracht Frankfurt	1–2	1–3

=== Quarter-finals ===
The draw for the quarter-finals was held on 17 October 2025.

The first legs were played on 11 February, and the second legs on 18 February 2026.

Quarter-finals
Team 1	Agg.	Team 2	1st leg	2nd leg
Sporting CP (Portugal)	1–1 (4–5 p)	(Sweden) Hammarby IF	0–1	1–0 (a.e.t.)
Sparta Prague (Czech Republic)	3–1	Austria Wien	0–0	3–1 (a.e.t.)
BK Häcken (Sweden)	11–1	(Iceland) Breiðablik	7–0	4–1
Eintracht Frankfurt (Germany)	7–2	(Denmark) Nordsjælland	4–0	3–2

=== Semi-finals ===
The draw for the semi-finals was held on 17 October 2025.

The first legs were played on 25 March, and the second legs on 2 April 2026.

Semi-finals
Team 1	Agg.	Team 2	1st leg	2nd leg
Sparta Prague (Czech Republic)	2–5	(Sweden) Hammarby IF	2–3	0–2
Eintracht Frankfurt (Germany)	1–3	(Sweden) BK Häcken	0–3	1–0

=== Final ===
The draw for the final was held on 17 October 2025. The first leg was played on 25 April, and the second leg on 1 May 2026.

25 April 2026
15:00 UTC+2

Hammarby IF (Sweden)	0–1	(Sweden) BK Häcken
	Report	Schröder 22'

3Arena, Stockholm
Attendance: 7,597
Referee: Silvia Gasperotti (Italy)
1 May 2026
16:00 UTC+2

BK Häcken (Sweden)	3–2	(Sweden) Hammarby IF
Schröder 6', 9', 53'	Report	Rehnberg 26'; Sørum 47'

Hisingen Arena, Gothenburg
Attendance: 5,566
Referee: Marta Huerta de Aza (Spain)

BK Häcken won 4–2 on aggregate.

== Statistics ==
Statistics exclude qualifying rounds and play-off round.

=== Top goalscorers ===
Rank	Player	Team	Goals
1	(Sweden) Felicia Schröder	(Sweden) BK Häcken	8
2	(Czech Republic) Michaela Khýrová	(Czech Republic) Sparta Prague	5
3	(Portugal) Telma Encarnação	(Portugal) Sporting CP	4
3	(Germany) Nicole Anyomi	(Germany) Eintracht Frankfurt	4
5	(Sweden) Monica Jusu Bah	(Sweden) BK Häcken	2
5	(Finland) Paulina Nyström	(Sweden) BK Häcken	2
5	(Norway) Vilde Hasund	(Sweden) Hammarby IF	2
5	(Czech Republic) Antonie Stárová	(Czech Republic) Sparta Prague	2
5	(Japan) Remina Chiba	(Germany) Eintracht Frankfurt	2
5	(Germany) Laura Freigang	(Germany) Eintracht Frankfurt	2
5	(Sweden) Rebecka Blomqvist	(Germany) Eintracht Frankfurt	2
5	(Ghana) Princess Marfo	(Denmark) FC Nordsjælland	2
5	(Norway) Elin Sørum	(Sweden) Hammarby IF	2
5	(Brazil) Helena Sampaio	(Sweden) BK Häcken	2
5	(Sweden) Alva Selerud	(Sweden) BK Häcken	2
5	(Sweden) Fanny Peterson	(Sweden) Hammarby IF	2
5	(Nigeria) Joy Omewa Ogochukwu	(Denmark) Fortuna Hjørring	2

== See also ==
- 2025–26 UEFA Women's Champions League
- 2025–26 UEFA Champions League
- 2025–26 UEFA Europa League
- 2025–26 UEFA Conference League
- 2025 UEFA Super Cup
- 2025–26 UEFA Youth League
