= Hammarby Fotboll (women) =

Swedish women's football club

- Full name: Hammarby IF
- Nicknames: Bajen, Söderbönorna
- Founded: 1970; 56 years ago, as Hammarby IF; 1999; 27 years ago, as Hammarby IF Damfotbollsförening; 2016; 10 years ago, as Hammarby IF Fotbollförening
- Ground: Hammarby IP, Stockholm
- Capacity: 3,700
- Chairman: Mattias Fri
- Manager: William Strömberg
- League: Damallsvenskan
- 2025: Damallsvenskan, 2nd of 14
- Website: www.hammarbyfotboll.se
Home colours	Away colours

Hammarby IF Fotbollförening (Swedish pronunciation: [ˈhâmːarˌbyː ˈfûːtbɔlsfœrˌeːnɪŋ]), commonly known as Hammarby IF (pronounced [- iːˈɛfː]), Hammarby Fotboll (pronounced [- ˈfûːtbɔl]) or simply Hammarby, is a women's football club from Stockholm founded in 1970.

Hammarby play their home games at Hammarby IP (also called Kanalplan) in the Södermalm district of Stockholm, and occasionally at Zinkensdamms IP and 3Arena.

Competing in Sweden's first tier, Damallsvenskan, Hammarby are placed fourth in the all-time Damallsvenskan table, and has won the Swedish championship twice: in 1985 and 2023. The club has won Svenska Cupen, the domestic cup competition, four times: in 1994, 1995, 2023 and 2025.

Since 2016, the club has been affiliated with Hammarby Fotboll, a men's team in Allsvenskan, and is a member of the Stockholms Fotbollförbund through its parent club.

== History ==
=== 1970–1984: Establishment of football club ===
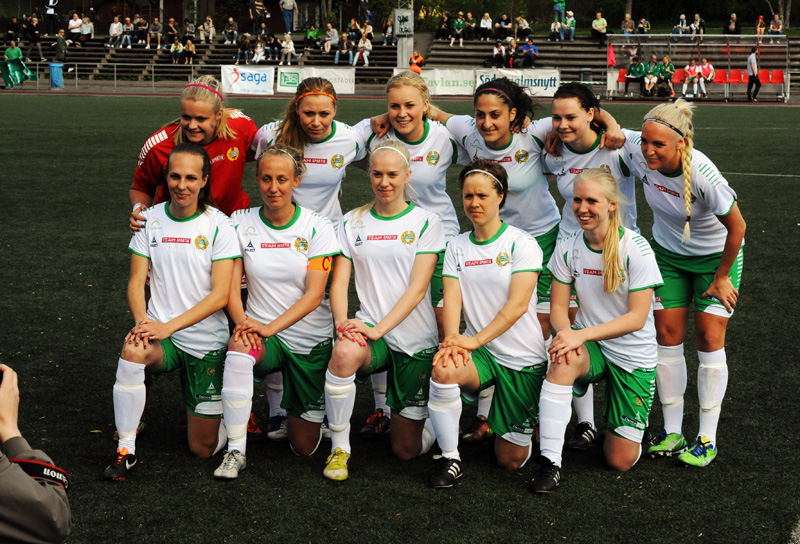
Before a match with Älta IF in 2013

The team was established in 1970, as a section under multi-sports club Hammarby IF, making it one the pioneers in Swedish women's football. Christer Molander is credited as being the founding force behind the establishment of a women's team within the club, and he also worked as head coach for the first five years. In 1973, he also coached the Swedish women's national team in their first ever official international game, a 0–0 home draw against Finland. Four players from Hammarby took part in the historical fixture: Gun Hellestig, Ingalill Arvling, Birgitta Johansson and Ann Jansson. About a year later, on 26 July 1974, Jansson would score Sweden's first ever international goal in a 1–0 away win against the same opponent, Finland.

From her debut in 1972 until in her retirement in 1984, Jansson was Hammarby's undisputed star player. In total, she scored 864 goals in 642 appearances as a forward, a club record. She led her side to five Swedish championship finals, but Hammarby lost all of them: to Jitex BK in 1974, Jakobsbergs GoIF in 1977, Sunnanå SK in 1982, and Öxabäcks IF in both 1978 and 1983. Another driving force behind Hammarby's success was Gunilla Paijkull. After five seasons as a player, she took over as head coach in 1977, a role she held for four years.

=== 1985–1999: First championship title ===
In 1985, Hammarby won their first Swedish championship title, beating GAIS in the final by 7–2 on aggregate. Hammarby forward Anette Nilsson became the league's top scorer with 19 goals.

One of the most renowned Swedish players, Pia Sundhage joined the club in 1986, but left after one season only to return in 1990. In 1994, she took over as player-coach and immediately led Hammarby to silver. Although the club finished as runner-up in Damallsvenskan, they won Svenska Cupen through a 2–1 win against Gideonsbergs IF in the final. In 1995, Hammarby defended its cup title through a 1–0 final win against Älvsjö AIK. Previously, the team had been the cup's runner-up in its first three editions (1981–83).

In 1999, Hammarby IF was reorganized when all the underlying sections got separated into an umbrella organization, with Hammarby IF DFF being founded.

=== 2000–2022: Yo-yo club and attendance record ===
The team's form declined from 2005 and in 2011 it was relegated to First Division for the first time. Before its relegation it was one of only two teams (the other one being FC Rosengård) to have played all 24 editions of the Damallsvenskan since the competition's foundation in 1988.

In recent years, Hammarby has been a typical yo-yo club. They finished the 2014 Elitettan season in 2nd place and gained promotion back to the Damallsvenskan. However, they enjoyed a short stint in the top tier, getting relegated in 2015. In 2016, the club once again gained a promotion from the second tier.

Before the start of the 2017 season, the side merged with Hammarby IF Fotboll, which previously only included the men's division.

On 10 October 2021, Hammarby set a new record attendance of 18,537 in Damallsvenskan, in a 4–1 home win against fierce rivals AIK played at Tele2 Arena.

=== 2023–: Winning the domestic double ===
On 6 June 2023, Hammarby won the 2022–23 Svenska Cupen, claiming their third title in the tournament's history. The final ended in a 3–0 win at home against BK Häcken, played in front of an attendance of 17,623. The club also won the 2023 Damallsvenskan, becoming Swedish champions for the second time in its history. In the last round of the campaign on 11 November, Hammarby won 2–0 against IFK Norrköping, bringing over 7,000 away fans to the away game. Later the same day, thousands of fans gathered at Medborgarplatsen in Stockholm to celebrate the title.

== Players ==
=== First-team squad ===
As of 24 October 2026

Note: Flags indicate national team as defined under FIFA eligibility rules; some limited exceptions apply. Players may hold more than one non-FIFA nationality.

No.	Pos.	Nation	Player
1	GK	SWE	Emma Holmgren
2	DF	NOR	Emilie Bragstad
3	DF	ISL	Gudrún Arnardóttir
4	DF	ENG	Jess Pegram (on loan from Brighton & Hove Albion)
5	MF	SWE	Filippa Curmark
6	MF	NOR	Elin Sørum
7	MF	DEN	Anna Walter
8	MF	FIN	Vilma Koivisto
9	FW	NOR	Mari Nyhagen
11	MF	SWE	Inès Lorenius
14	DF	SWE	Mathilde Janzen
15	DF	SWE	Sofia Reidy
16	FW	SWE	Svea Rehnberg

No.	Pos.	Nation	Player
17	DF	SWE	Stina Lennartsson
18	DF	SWE	Alice Carlsson (captain)
19	FW	ISL	Ída Hermannsdóttir
20	MF	NOR	Vilde Hasund
22	MF	SWE	Anna Linder
23	DF	SWE	Athinna Persson Lundgren
24	DF	SWE	Sally Nylén
25	MF	SWE	Fanny Peterson
26	MF	SWE	Doris Petz
27	MF	SWE	Stella Maiquez
28	GK	DEN	Lene Christensen
29	GK	SWE	Cajsa Andersson

=== Out on loan ===
Note: Flags indicate national team as defined under FIFA eligibility rules; some limited exceptions apply. Players may hold more than one non-FIFA nationality.

No.	Pos.	Nation	Player
21	MF	SWE	Vera Blom (at IF Brommapojkarna until unknown date)

=== Notable players ===
List criteria:

- player has made more than 200 Damallsvenskan appearances for the club, or
- player has scored more than 50 Damallsvenskan goals for the club, or
- player has won Diamantbollen, or
- player is a member of the Swedish football Hall of Fame.

Name	Nationality	Hammarby career	Total appearances (Note: Goals and appearances for Hammarby IF in Damallsvenskan.)	Total goals	Diamantbollen	Hall of Fame
Kristin Bengtsson	Sweden	1988–1996; 2008–2010	222	37	1994; 2004	
Lilie Persson	Sweden	1983–1986; 1989–1996	218	28		
Anneli Olsson	Sweden	1988–1996	186	58		
Pia Sundhage	Sweden	1986; 1990–1996	129	38	1981	Yes
Salina Olsson	Sweden	2000–2005	117	67		
Ann Jansson	Sweden	1973–1984	90	72		Yes
Minna Heponiemi	Sweden	1997–2000	76	65		
Ellen Gibson	Sweden	2011-2024	201	6		

== Management ==
=== Coaching staff ===
As of 30 July 2026

Position	Staff
Head Coach	(Sweden) William Strömberg
Assistant Coach	(Sweden) Viktor Blom
Assistant Coach	(Sweden) Marcus Rinvall
Assistant Coach	(Sweden) Alfred Mörk-Eidem
Goalkeeper Coach	(Sweden) Aleksandar Vasilic
Fitness Coach	(Sweden) Johan Ölmedal
Team Managers	(Sweden) Emmy Pettersson Parnevik
Team Managers	(Sweden) Igor Kubát
MEDICAL STAFF
Team Doctor	(Sweden) Jennifer Settergren
Physiotherapists	(Sweden) Ida Wiberg
Physiotherapists	(Sweden) Frida Merrifield
Physiotherapists	(Sweden) Emma Skarle

=== Club officials ===
Position	Staff
Director of Football	(Sweden) Johan Lager
Technical Director	(Sweden) Adrian von Heijne
Sporting Director	(Iceland) Arnór Smárason

== Results and attendances ==
In recent seasons Hammarby have had the following results and average attendances:

Season	Average attendance	Division/section	Level	Position
2003	998	Damallsvenskan	Tier 1	4
2004	766	Damallsvenskan	Tier 1	5
2005	571	Damallsvenskan	Tier 1	9
2006	510	Damallsvenskan	Tier 1	7
2007	642	Damallsvenskan	Tier 1	8
2008	567	Damallsvenskan	Tier 1	8
2009	602	Damallsvenskan	Tier 1	9
2010	525	Damallsvenskan	Tier 1	10
2011	728	Damallsvenskan	Tier 1	11
2012	226	Norrettan	Tier 2	6
2013	309	Elitettan	Tier 2	4
2014	412	Elitettan	Tier 2	2
2015	805	Damallsvenskan	Tier 1	11
2016	402	Elitettan	Tier 2	2
2017	712	Damallsvenskan	Tier 1	7
2018	1 383	Damallsvenskan	Tier 1	11
2019	1 355	Elitettan	Tier 2	3
2020	30 (Note: Matches were played behind closed doors, or with limited attendance, due to the COVID-19 pandemic.)	Elitettan	Tier 2	2
2021	2 119 (Note: Matches were partly played with limited attendance due to the COVID-19 pandemic.)	Damallsvenskan	Tier 1	7
2022	2 391	Damallsvenskan	Tier 1	5
2023	4 043	Damallsvenskan	Tier 1	1
2024	2 366	Damallsvenskan	Tier 1	3
2025	2 134	Damallsvenskan	Tier 1	2

* Attendances are provided in the Svenska Fotbollförbundet website.

== Honours ==
=== League ===
- Damallsvenskan:
  - Champions: 1985, 2023
  - Runners-up: 1994, 2025
- Elitettan:
  - Runners-up: 2014, 2016, 2020

=== Cups ===
- Swedish Cup:
  - Champions: 1994, 1995, 2022–23, 2024–25, 2025–26
  - Runners-up: 1981, 1982, 1983

=== European ===
- Menton Tournament:
  - Winners: 1986
- UEFA Women's Europa Cup
  - Runners-up: 2025–26

=== Futsal ===
- Damallsvenskan i futsal
  - Champions: 1995, 2000

== See also ==
- Hammarby Fotboll, men's team
- Hammarby IF, sports club
