= Britta Elsert Gynning =

Swedish footballer

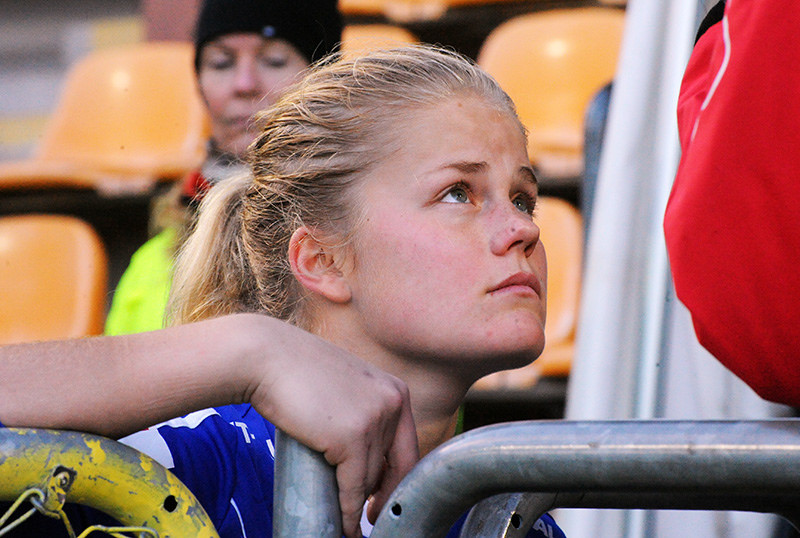

Personal information
- Date of birth: 5 December 1995 (age 30)
- Place of birth: Sweden

Team information
- Current team: Hammarby IF

Senior career*
Years	Team	Apps	(Gls)
2013–2015	AIK	16	(0)
2016–2018	Eskilstuna United	6	(0)
2019–2021	Hammarby IF	43	(0)
- * Club domestic league appearances and goals as of 16 January 2022

Britta Elsert Gynning (born 5 December 1995) is a Swedish former footballer who played as a goalkeeper.
