= Minna Heponiemi =

Swedish footballer

Personal information
- Date of birth: 10 August 1977 (age 49)
- Position: Forward

Senior career*
| Years | Team | Apps | (Gls) |
| 1997–2000 | Hammarby IF | 76 | (65) |

International career
| | Sweden | 1 | (0) |
- * Club domestic league appearances and goals

Minna Heponiemi (born 10 August 1977) is a Swedish former women's international footballer who played as a forward. She was a member of the Sweden women's national football team and took part in the 1999 FIFA Women's World Cup.

== Early life ==
Heponiemi was born to Finnish parents and grew up in Vagnhärad, Sweden. A Finnish citizen by birth, she changed to Swedish citizenship when she was 15 years old.
