= Gemma Lawley =

English footballer (born 2002)

Personal information
- Full name: Gemma Louise Lawley
- Date of birth: 15 September 2002 (age 24)
- Place of birth: Birmingham, England
- Position: Defender

Team information
- Current team: Bristol City
- Number: 3

Youth career
- West Bromwich Albion
- Birmingham City

Senior career*
| Years | Team | Apps | (Gls) |
| 2020–2025 | Birmingham City | 69 | (4) |
| 2025– | Bristol City | 0 | (0) |
- * Club domestic league appearances and goals as of 01 February 2025 (UTC)

Gemma Louise Lawley (born 15 September 2002) is an English defender who plays for FA Women's Championship team Bristol City.

Lawley has spent the majority of her career with Birmingham City before joining Bristol City in 2025.

== Club career ==
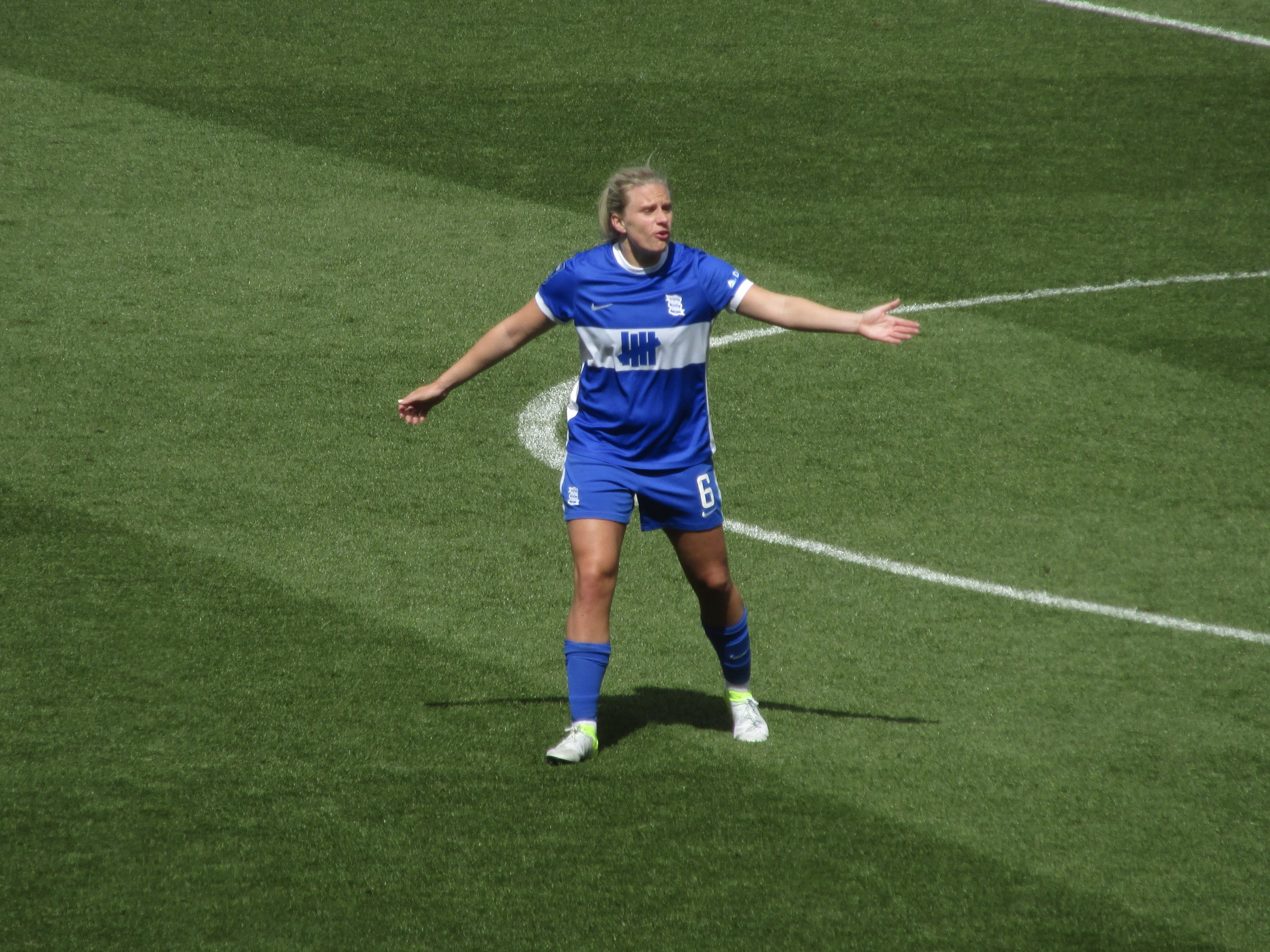
Playing for Birmingham City Women v London City Lionesses, St Andrews, 2024–25 season

Lawley joined the Birmingham City academy at the age of 16 having previously been part of the West Bromwich Albion youth setup. She made her senior debut for Birmingham on 30 September 2020, starting against Everton in a 4–0 FA Cup semi-final defeat to Everton which had been delayed from the previous season due to the COVID-19 pandemic. Her first FA WSL appearance came against West Ham United on 8 November 2020, appearing as a substitute for the last three minutes of the match as Birmingham lost 2–1. Lawley finished her first full campaign with a combined ten appearances as Birmingham finished 11th out of 12. In July 2021, Lawley signed a two-year contract ahead of the 2021–22 season.

Lawley's involvement with the first team increased significantly in her second season, with 19 league appearances including 18 starts and a further six cup appearances. She scored her first professional goal in a 3–2 loss to Reading on 23 January 2022. The goal came in the third minute of the game, a header from Lucy Quinn's corner. On 4 May 2022, Birmingham City were relegated to the FA Women's Championship following a 6–0 defeat away at Manchester City with one game remaining. On 5 December 2023, Lawley was named Barclays Women's Championship Player of the Month for November after receiving the majority vote.

After seven years with Birmingham, on 21 July 2025, Lawley was announced at Bristol City, signing a two year contract with the club.

== International career ==
In November 2020, Lawley was called up to the England under-19s.

== Career statistics ==
=== Club ===
As of match played 8 May 2022.

| Club | Season | League | | | FA Cup | | League Cup | | Total | |
| Club | Season | Division | Apps | Goals | Apps | Goals | Apps | Goals | Apps | Goals |
|---|---|---|---|---|---|---|---|---|---|---|
| Birmingham City | FA WSL | 2020–21 | 5 | 0 | 3 (Note: Includes one appearance in the delayed 2019–20 Women's FA Cup) | 0 | 2 | 0 | 10 | 0 |
| Birmingham City | FA WSL | 2021–22 | 19 | 1 | 3 | 0 | 3 | 0 | 25 | 1 |
| Career total | | | 24 | 1 | 6 | 0 | 5 | 0 | 35 | 1 |
