= Cajsa Andersson =

Swedish footballer

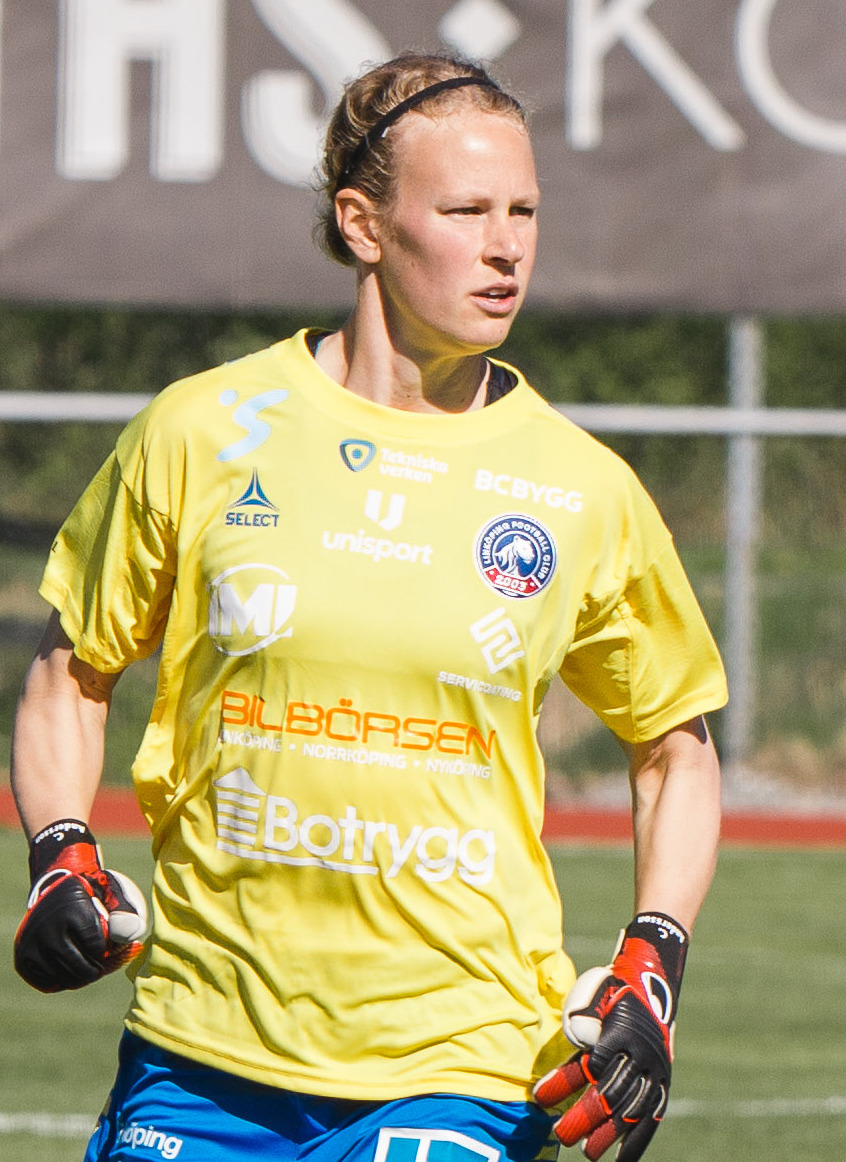
- Andersson with Linköpings FC in 2025

Personal information
- Full name: Cajsa Andersson
- Date of birth: 19 January 1993 (age 33)
- Place of birth: Stockholm, Sweden
- Height: 1.76 m (5 ft 9 in)
- Position: Goalkeeper

Team information
- Current team: Hammarby IF
- Number: 1

Senior career*
Years	Team	Apps	(Gls)
2013–2014	Älta IF	51	(0)
2015–2017	Linköpings FC	43	(0)
2018–2019	Piteå IF	44	(0)
2020–2025	Linköpings FC	110	(1)
2025–	Hammarby IF	13	(0)

International career
2019	Sweden	2	(0)
- * Club domestic league appearances and goals as of 22 November 2026

Cajsa Andersson (born 19 January 1993) is a Swedish footballer who plays as a goalkeeper for Damallsvenskan club Hammarby IF and the Sweden national team.

== Honours ==
Linköpings FC

Winner

- Damallsvenskan: 2016, 2017
- Svenska Cupen: 2014–15

Runner-up

- Svenska Supercupen: 2015
