= Malia Steinmetz =

New Zealand association football player

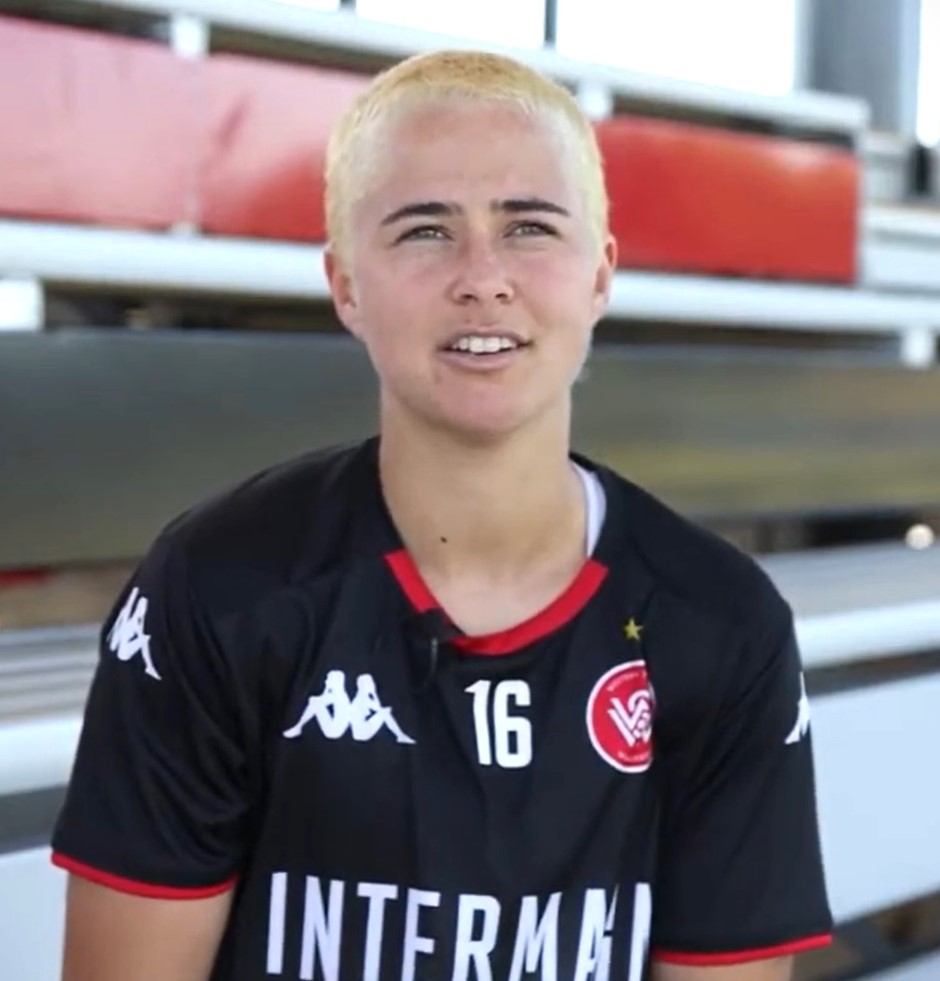
- Steinments interviewed for the Western Sydney Wanderers in 2022

Personal information
- Full name: Malia Rose Steinmetz
- Date of birth: 18 January 1999 (age 27)
- Place of birth: Auckland, New Zealand
- Height: 1.69 m (5 ft 7 in)
- Position: Midfielder

Team information
- Current team: Nordsjælland
- Number: 16

Senior career*
Years	Team	Apps	(Gls)
- Three Kings United
- Forrest Hill Milford United
2019	Northern Tigers	26	(2)
2020–2021	Perth Glory	12	(0)
2021	Northern Tigers	19	(4)
2021–2023	Western Sydney Wanderers	27	(0)
2023–	Nordsjælland	35	(0)

International career^{‡}
2013–2014	New Zealand U17		
2017–2018	New Zealand U20		
2017–	New Zealand	35	(0)
- * Club domestic league appearances and goals as of 23 May 2026. ‡ National team caps and goals as of 23 May 2026.

Malia Rose Steinmetz (born 18 January 1999) is a New Zealand footballer who plays as a midfielder for Nordsjælland and the New Zealand women's national team.

== Club career ==
In August 2023, following the 2023 FIFA Women's World Cup, Steinmetz joined Danish club Nordsjælland.

== International career ==
Steinmetz was a member of the New Zealand U-17 side at the 2016 FIFA U-17 Women's World Cup in Jordan, the New Zealand U-20 side at the 2016 FIFA U-20 Women's World Cup in Papua New Guinea, and again at the 2018 FIFA U-20 Women's World Cup in France.

Steinmetz made her senior début as a substitute in a 5–0 win over Thailand on 28 November 2017.

Steinmetz was called up to the New Zealand squad for the 2023 FIFA Women's World Cup.

On 4 July 2024, Steinmetz was called up to the New Zealand squad for the 2024 Summer Olympics.
