= Libby Smith (footballer) =

English footballer (born 2001)

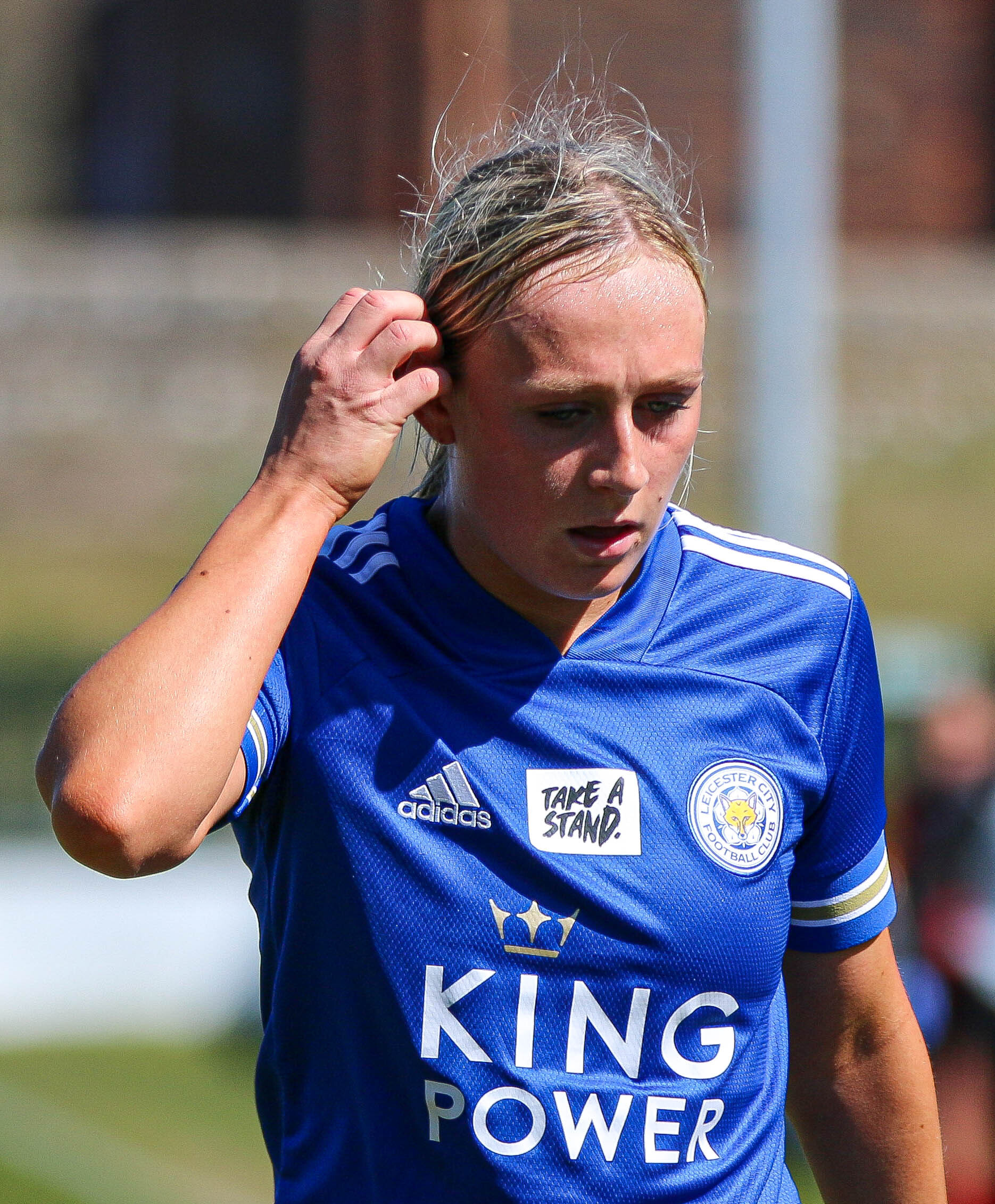
- Smith playing for Leicester City in 2021

Personal information
- Date of birth: 11 March 2001 (age 25)
- Place of birth: Leicester, England
- Positions: Forward; winger

Team information
- Current team: Hibernian

Youth career
- Thetford Town
- Chelsea

Senior career*
Years	Team	Apps	(Gls)
2018–2021	Leicester City	38	(5)
2021–2025	Birmingham City	33	(8)
2025–2026	Sporting JAX	0	(0)
2026	Nottingham Forest	2	(0)
2026–	Hibernian	7	(5)

International career^{‡}
2017–2018	England U17	4	(1)
2018–2019	England U18	6	(1)
2019–2020	England U19	4	(0)
- * Club domestic league appearances and goals as of 5 May 2026 ‡ National team caps and goals as of 12:15, 9 March 2020 (UTC)

Libby Smith (born 11 March 2001) is an English professional footballer who plays as a forward for Hibernian.

Smith previously played for Leicester City and Birmingham City.

== Youth career ==
Born in Leicester, Smith joined Leicester City aged 7. She is also a product of the Chelsea academy, and played for Thetford Town in Norfolk, making four appearances for the girls team.

== Club career ==
=== Leicester City ===
On 30 June 2021, having helped Leicester City in the 2020–21 season to gain promotion to the Women's Super League for the first time in the clubs history, while playing as a right-back, it was announced that Smith would be among nine players leaving the club.

=== Birmingham City ===
On 28 July 2021, Smith signed for Women's Championship club Birmingham City.

On 10 January 2022, during the 2021–22 season in the WSL, Smith featured in the stunning defeat against league leaders Arsenal, scoring the opening goal in the 2–0 victory that ended Arsenal's unbeaten run. Her goal in the third minute that caught out Arsenal's defenders, described as "beautiful in its simplicity" by Optus Sport, would also be her debut goal in the top tier of English women's football.

With City relegated back to the Championship for the 2022–23 season, they faced top tier opposition again for the first time against Brighton & Hove Albion in the League Cup, with Smith scoring an important goal in the 3–2 victory.

=== Sporting JAX ===
On 9 September 2025, Sporting JAX, an expansion team in the USL Super League, announced the signing of Smith to their inaugural season roster. She reunited with former Birmingham teammate Jade Pennock. On 23 December 2025, Smith posted via her Instagram that she had left Sporting JAX.

=== Nottingham Forest ===
On 23 January 2026, Smith joined Women's Super League 2 club Nottingham Forest for the remainder of the 2025 26 Women's Super League season.

=== Hibernian ===
On 23 August 2026, Smith was announced at Hibernian.

== International career ==
In her youth international career, Smith represented the England under-17s, under-18s, and under-19s, while captaining the latter. In July 2019 she was called up to the under-18s for three friendly matches, and in March 2020, she played in La Manga Tournament in Spain for the under-19s.

== Style of play ==
Smith can play as a winger or as a striker and in 2020–21 played a season at right-back. Jade Pennock described Smith as a creative, attack-minded player.

== Career statistics ==
As of match played October 4, 2025

Club	Season	League			Cup		Playoffs		Total	
Club	Season	Division	Apps	Goals	Apps	Goals	Apps	Goals	Apps	Goals
Leicester City	2018–21	(England) FA Women's Championship	38	5	8	1	—		46	6
Birmingham City	2021–22	(England) Women's Super League	20	2	5	0	2	0	25	2
Birmingham City	2022–25	(England) Women's Championship	44	9	6	3	—		50	12
Sporting JAX	2025–26	(United States) USL Super League	0	0	—		—		0	0
Career total			102	16	14	4	2	0	121	20

== Honours ==
Leicester City

- Women's Championship: 2020–21

Birmingham City

- Women's Championship: 2022–23 runner up
