= Laila El Behery =

Egyptian footballer

Personal information
- Full name: Laila Sherif El Behery
- Date of birth: 14 September 2003 (age 23)
- Place of birth: Cairo, Egypt
- Height: 1.70 m (5 ft 7 in)
- Position: Forward

Team information
- Current team: FC Nordsjælland
- Number: 12

College career
| Years | Team | Apps | (Gls) |
| 2021–2024 | UC Irvine | 60 | (6) |

Senior career*
| Years | Team | Apps | (Gls) |
| 2016–2020 | Wadi Degla | | |
- → Kafr Saad (loan)
| 2020–2021 | El Gouna | | |
| 2025– | FC Nordsjælland | 2 | (0) |

International career
- Egypt U17
| 2020–2023 | Egypt U20 | | |
| 2021– | Egypt | | |
- * Club domestic league appearances and goals

Laila Sherif El Behery (Arabic: ليلى شريف البحيري; born 14 September 2003) is an Egyptian footballer who plays as a striker for Danish club FC Nordsjælland and the Egypt women's national team.

== College career ==
In August 2021, El Behery joined UC Irvine, making her collegiate debut in the season opener against UCLA, where she played 24 minutes off the bench and registered her first career assist and point with an 89th-minute strike in a 3–1 defeat. In her second year, she was named to the Big West Fall All-Academic Team, and in her third year, she earned Big West Offensive Player of the Week honors.

== Club career ==
El Behery began her football career with Wadi Degla, making her official debut in the Egyptian Women's Premier League on 14 October 2016. where she scored a brace against Cairene Al Masry (Arabic: المصري القاهري).

In January 2025, El Behery made history by joining FC Nordsjælland in the Kvindeligaen, becoming the first Egyptian to play in Denmark's women's league. On 16 March 2025, She made her debut for the Tigrene against Odense Boldklub Q, coming on a subtitue for Anna Walter on the 63th minute. On 10 September 2025, She became the first Egyptian women's footballer to score at a European competition when she scored against KuPS during the 2025–26 UEFA Women's Europa Cup qualifying rounds.

== International career ==
El Behery excelled internationally with Egypt's U-17 and U-20 national teams before joining the senior squad, where she participated in the qualifiers for the World Cup and the Africa Women's Cup of Nations.

International goals

| No. | Date | Venue | Opponent | Score | Result | Competition |
|---|---|---|---|---|---|---|
| 1. | 20 October 2021 | Petro Sport Stadium, Cairo, Egypt | Tunisia | 1–1 | 2–6 | 2022 WAFCON qualification |
| 2. | 4 April 2025 | Al Salam Training Field, Nasr City, Egypt | Jordan | 1–0 | 3–0 | Friendly |
| 3. | 8 April 2025 | Egyptian Air Defense Stadium, Cairo, Egypt | Jordan | 1–0 | 5–1 | Friendly |
| 4. | 8 April 2025 | Egyptian Air Defense Stadium, Cairo, Egypt | Jordan | 4–1 | 5–1 | Friendly |
| 5. | 2 March 2026 | EFA Center, Cairo, Egypt | Algeria | 1–1 | 2–3 | Friendly |

== Personal life ==
El Behery is a Muslim. Her dream club is FC Barcelona Femení.
