= Nikki IJzerman =

Dutch footballer

Personal information
- Full name: Nikki IJzerman
- Date of birth: 6 August 2000 (age 26)
- Place of birth: Netherlands, Dordrecht,
- Position: Midfielder

Team information
- Current team: RSC Anderlecht
- Number: 29

Senior career*
Years	Team	Apps	(Gls)
2017–2020	Excelsior	59	(0)
2020–2024	ADO Den Haag	75	(10)
2024–	RSC Anderlecht		
- * Club domestic league appearances and goals as of 6 October 2024

Nikki IJzerman (born 6 August 2000) is a Dutch footballer and journalist who plays as a midfielder for RSC Anderlecht.

== Career ==
=== Excelsior ===
IJzerman made her league debut against PSV on 1 September 2017.

=== ADO Den Haag ===
On 30 April 2020, IJzerman joined ADO Den Haag. She made her league debut against PEC Zwolle on 6 September 2020. A hamstring injury kept her out for 4 weeks in February 2021. She scored her first league goal against Feyenoord on 1 May 2022, scoring in the 16th minute. On 5 May 2023, alongside Lobke Loonen and Bo Vonk, IJzerman signed a new one-year deal. She won the Player of the Year award at ADO Den Haag.

=== RSC Anderlecht ===
On 14 June 2024, IJzerman joined RSC Anderlecht, signing a one-year contract with the club.

== Personal life ==
IJzerman was born in Dordrecht. She studied a master's degree in Journalism and New Media at Leiden University. She also has a bachelor's degree in history. IJzerman did an internship with Den Haag Centraal as a journalist, and now writes for them regularly.
