= Amy Rodgers =

British association football player (born 2000)

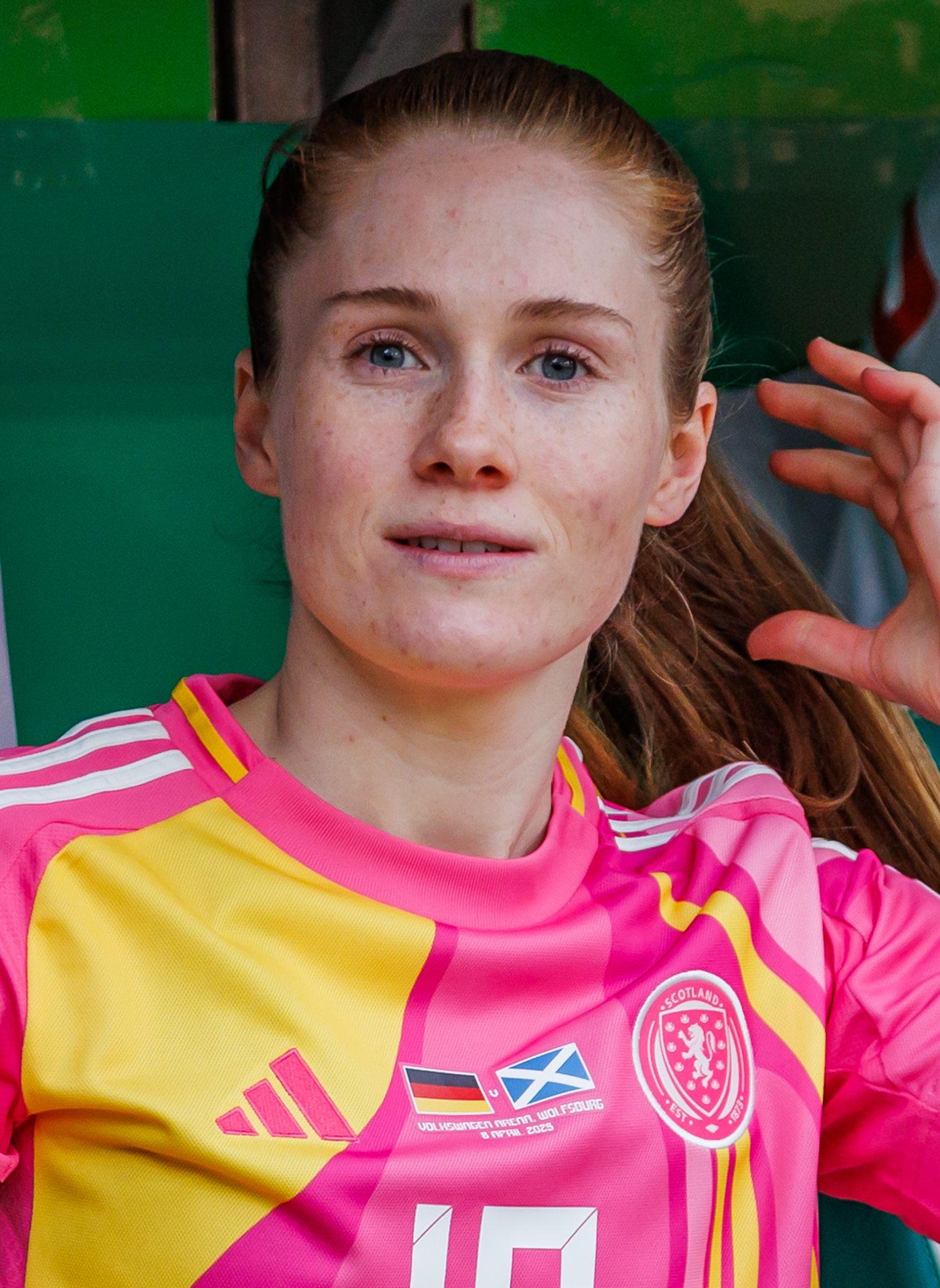
- Rodgers with Scotland in 2025

Personal information
- Full name: Amy Mae Rodgers
- Date of birth: 4 May 2000 (age 26)
- Place of birth: Barnet, England
- Height: 1.72 m (5 ft 8 in)
- Position: Midfielder

Team information
- Current team: Brøndby IF
- Number: 6

Youth career
- Vale Juniors Congleton
- Crewe Alexandra
- Everton
- Liverpool

Senior career*
Years	Team	Apps	(Gls)
2017–2021	Liverpool	35	(4)
2021–2023	London City Lionesses	44	(12)
2023–2025	Bristol City	42	(2)
2025–2026	Nottingham Forest	21	(0)
2026–	Brøndby IF	12	(0)

International career^{‡}
2016–2017	England U17	9	(0)
2018–2019	England U19	14	(1)
2019–2020	England U21	4	(0)
2023–	Scotland	12	(0)
- * Club domestic league appearances and goals as of 30 October 2026 ‡ National team caps and goals as of 25 October 2025

Amy Mae Rodgers (born 4 May 2000) is a professional footballer who plays as a midfielder for A-Liga club Brøndby and the Scotland national team.

She previously played for Liverpool, London City Lionesses, Bristol City and Nottingham Forest. She represented England in youth internationals, but subsequently changed her international status to play for Scotland.

== Club career ==
Rodgers started playing football with Vale Juniors Congleton. She then played within youth sides at Crewe Alexandra and then at Everton Ladies Centre of Excellence before joining the Liverpool youth system.

=== Liverpool ===
Rodgers made her first team debut away at Yeovil Town Ladies during the 2017 Spring Series, proving to be a talented youngster in the Reds ranks. In 2016 she was named Young Sports Achiever of the Year at The Everybody Awards (the event is held annually to recognise the exceptional achievements of sporting and community heroes in Cheshire East). In May 2019 she was named 2018–19 Fan's Liverpool Women's Player of the Year and Young Player of the Season. Rodgers is in the running for the Women's Rising Star of the Year award at the 2019 Northwest Football Awards. In July 2020 Rodgers signed a contract extension at Liverpool Women FC.

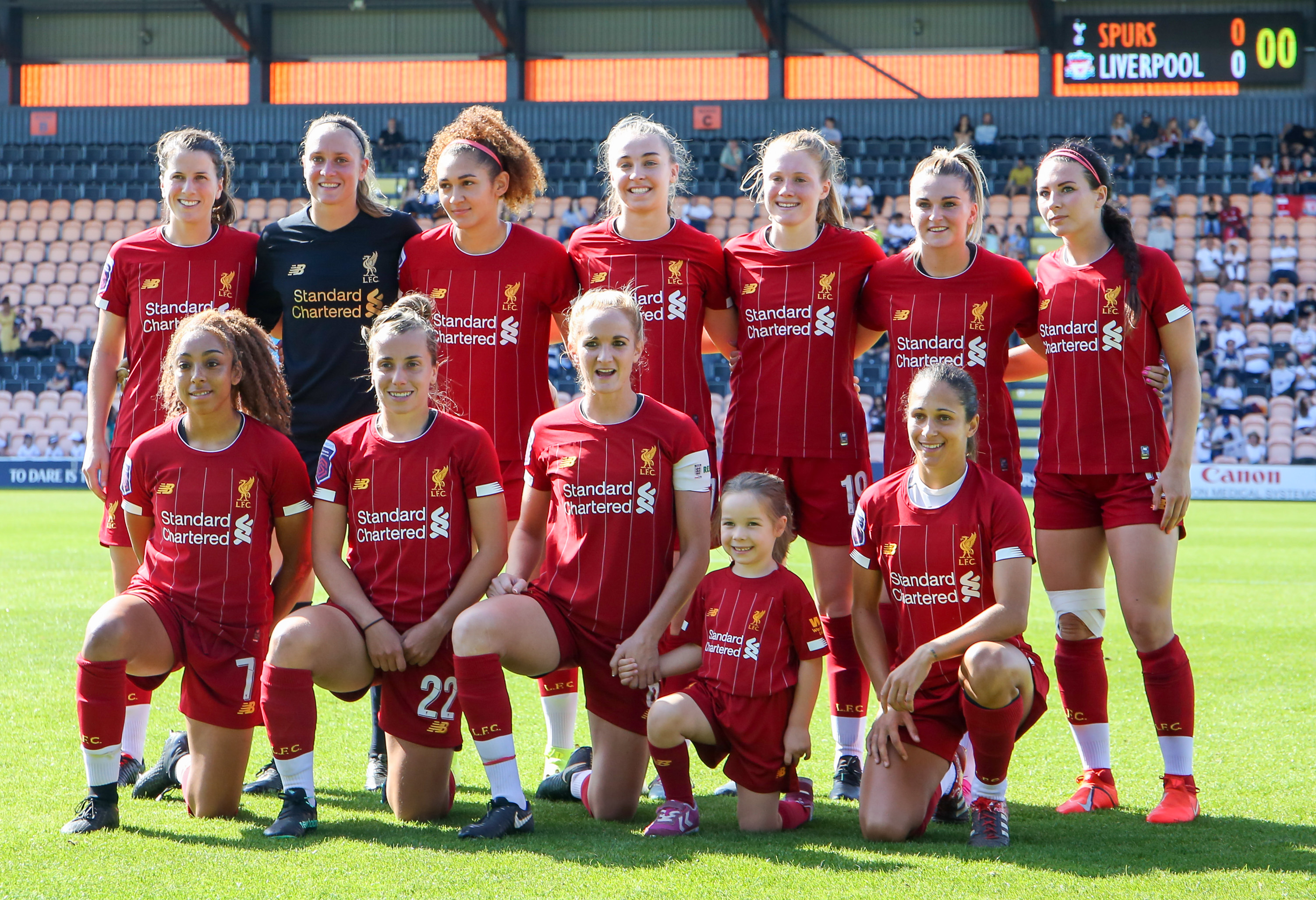
Rodgers (standing, third from right) with Liverpool, 2019

=== London City Lionesses ===
Rodgers joined London City Lionesses in July 2021. In a successful first season she was the top goalscorer, made the most assists and won goal of the season in the end of season awards. She was also nominated for the On Her Side Championship Player of the Year.

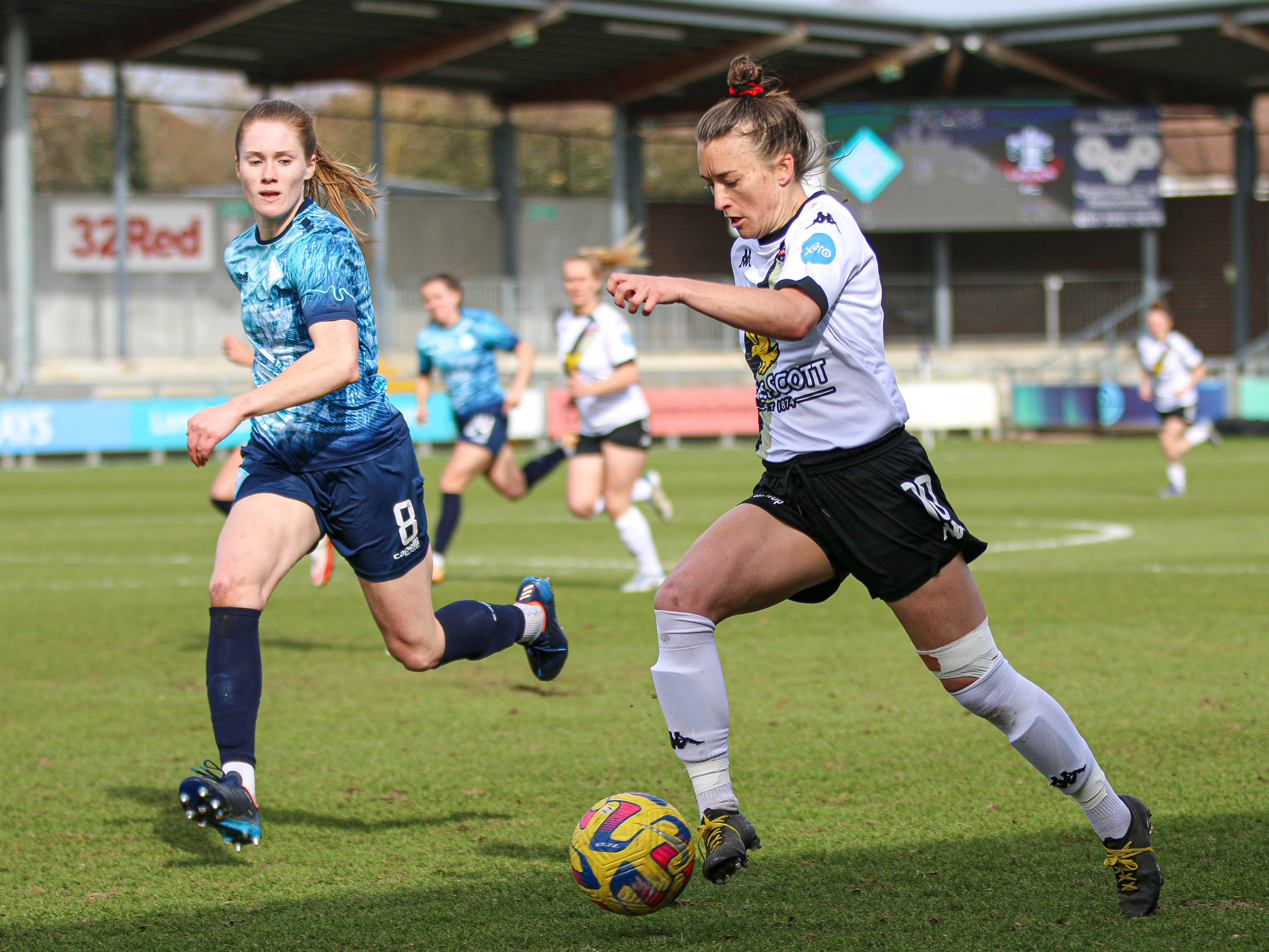
Rodgers (left) with London City Lionesses vs Lewes FC Women, March 2023

=== Bristol City ===
In July 2023 Rodgers announced she had signed for Bristol City. On 2 July 2025, it was announced that Rodgers had left the club upon the expiry of her contract, with the club describing Rodgers as "having been a consistent figure in midfield" across her two seasons with the Robins. Rodgers played in every domestic league fixture for two seasons in a row.

=== Nottingham Forest ===
On 2 July 2025, it was announced that Rodgers had signed a two-year contract with Nottingham Forest.

=== Brøndby IF ===
On 27 June 2026, Rodgers was announced at Brøndby IF.

== International career ==
Rodgers represented England at youth levels, but also qualified to play for Scotland through her Glaswegian mother. She debuted with the England U17s in 2017, playing seven times for them. Rodgers was also a member of the U19s squad which secured qualification for the European Championship in Scotland in summer 2019. She thereafter featured for the England under-21 squad.

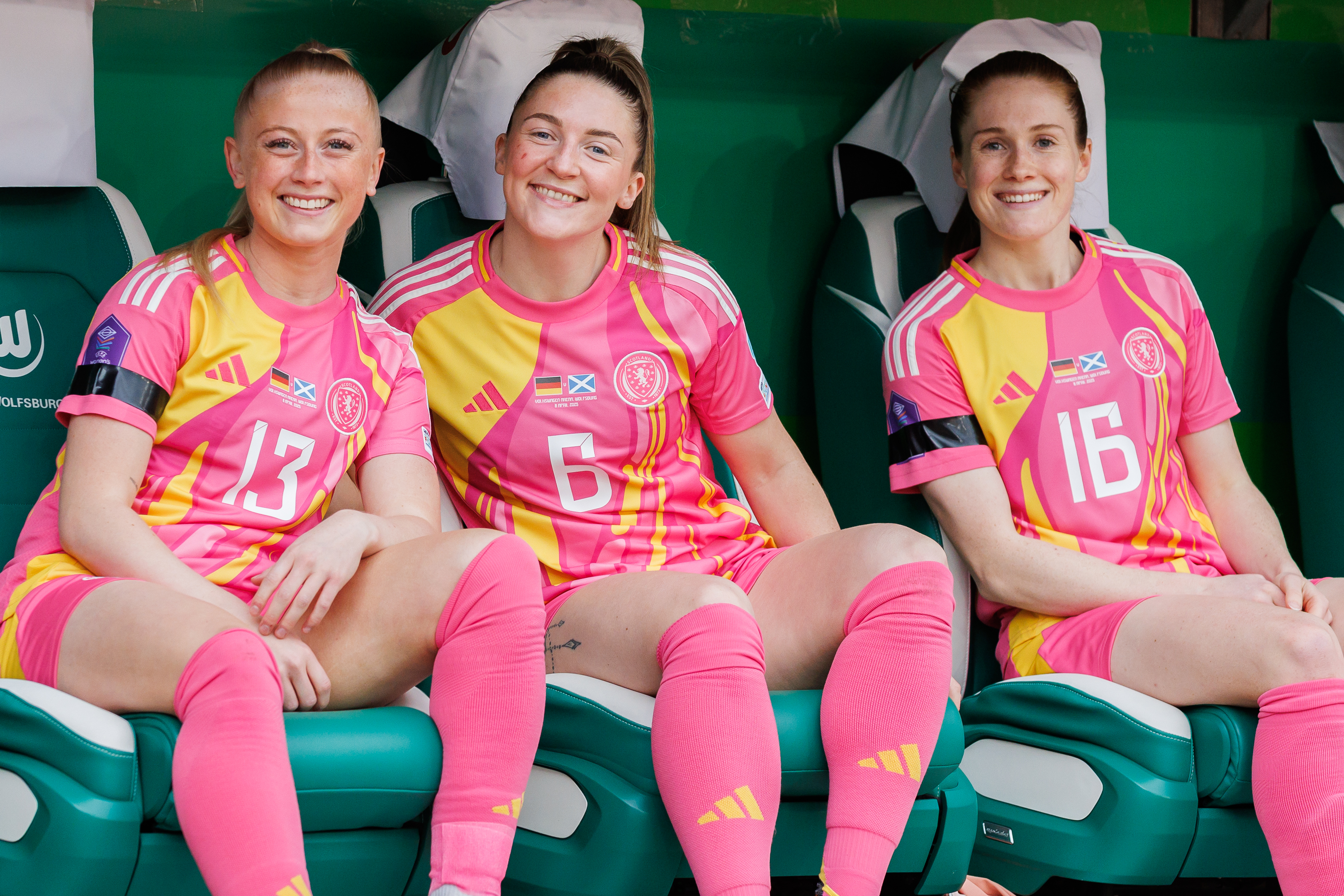
Rodgers (right, with Freya Gregory and Chelsea Cornet) on the substitutes' bench for Scotland, April 2025

Rodgers received her first call-up to the Scotland senior squad on 27 June 2023, for friendlies against Northern Ireland and Finland.

== Personal life ==
Rodgers combined her full-time football commitments with studying for a Psychology degree at the University of Liverpool. In July 2022 she graduated with a first class honours degree.

== Career statistics ==
As of 2 May 2026.

Club	Season	League			FA Cup (Note: Includes the Women's FA Cup)		League Cup (Note: Includes the WSL Cup/Women's League Cup)		Total	
Club	Season	Division	Apps	Goals	Apps	Goals	Apps	Goals	Apps	Goals
Liverpool F.C.	2017	FA WSL	2	0	0	0	0	0	2	0
Liverpool F.C.	2017–18	FA WSL	4	0	1	0	0	0	5	0
Liverpool F.C.	2018–19	FA WSL	12	1	2	0	3	0	16	1
Liverpool F.C.	2019–20	FA WSL	3	0	1	0	3	0	8	0
Liverpool F.C.	2020–21	Championship	14	3	2	0	1	0	17	3
Liverpool F.C.	Total		35	4	7	0	7	0	50	4
London City Lionesses	2021–22	Championship	22	6	2	0	3	1	27	7
London City Lionesses	2022–23	Championship	22	6	2	0	3	0	27	6
London City Lionesses	Total		44	12	4	0	6	1	54	13
Bristol City F.C.	2023–24	FA WSL	22	1	1	0	3	0	26	1
Bristol City F.C.	2024–25	Championship	20	1	1	0	3	0	24	1
Bristol City F.C.	Total		42	2	2	0	6	0	50	2
Nottingham Forest	2025–26	WSL 2	21	0	2	0	3	0	26	0
Nottingham Forest	Total		21	0	2	0	3	0	26	0
Career total			142	18	15	0	22	1	179	19

== Social media ==
- Amy_Rodgers on Twitter_
- Amy Rodgers Instagram
