= Futsal in Sweden =

The origins of futsal in Sweden date back to 2001. At that time, some indoor football enthusiasts contacted the Swedish Football Association (SvFF) and asked them for advice on how to play indoor soccer more seriously with futsal. Also at that time, there was a proposal from the SvFF development group not to adapt to futsal and to remain with five-a-side. These indoor soccer enthusiasts aborted their proposal which led them into carrying out further investigations on futsal before taking any decision.

These indoor football enthusiasts, now futsal enthusiasts, contacted FIFA and UEFA for advice. They arranged a meeting with UEFA and were advised not to do anything that the SvFF disliked. UEFA also advised them not to wait for the SvFF's approval and to proceed with their own ideas of development. With UEFAs help they got a "letter of recommendation" from FIFA that said the group was "certified" as Swedish futsal developers. This letter opened up many doors in the SvFF and other institutions.

The group approached clubs, authorities, manufacturers and media companies who could further benefit the development of futsal. They launched a website, futsal.se that would serve as a portal for all futsal matters in Sweden and at the same time to put more pressure on the SvFF to act. In 2002, they started the first Swedish futsal championship. They have got 12 soccer clubs from Stockholm of the 2-4th division to participate. It stirred up some dust in the SvFF who now had something to make a decision upon. As the football clubs increasingly liked futsal, SvFF made a proposal to the soccer movement to adapt to futsal in favour of five-a-side in 2006.

From 2008 SvFF rules futsal in Sweden with the network Swedish Futsal pushing on.
