= Anna Walter =

Danish footballer

Personal information
- Full name: Anna Christine Walter
- Date of birth: 21 April 2004 (age 22)
- Place of birth: Denmark
- Position: Left winger

Team information
- Current team: Hammarby
- Number: 7

Youth career
- –2020: Nordsjælland academy
- 2020–2021: OB Q

Senior career*
Years	Team	Apps	(Gls)
2021	HB Køge		
2022	Sundby		
2023–2026	Nordsjælland	102	(20)
2026–	Hammarby	10	(0)

International career^{‡}
2020	Denmark U16	3	(0)
2019	Denmark U17	2	(0)
2022–2023	Denmark U19	15	(2)
2024–2025	Denmark U23	4	(1)
2025	Denmark	3	(0)
- * Club domestic league appearances and goals as of 21:20, 22 November 2026 (UTC) ‡ National team caps and goals as of 19:52, 30 September 2026 (UTC)

Anna Christine Walter is a Danish professional footballer who plays as a left-winger for Damallsvenskan club Hammarby and the Denmark national team. Walter previously played for A-Liga clubs Nordsjælland and HB Køge. She was named the 2025 Danish Talent of the Year.

== Youth career ==
Walter started playing football with the boys team at Frederiksberg BK before moving to FC Damsø. She moved to the Nordsjælland U19 academy where she played until 2020 before joining OB Q for one year.

== Club career ==
At 17 Walter began her senior career in 2021 with A-Liga club HB Køge, where she spent just half a season before signing with B-Liga club Sundby in 2022. Following a year with Sundby, Walter signed with her former youth club Nordsjælland in December 2022. Walter played for the A-Liga side for three years before signing with Hammarby in 2026.

== Honours ==
Nordsjælland

- A-Liga: 2023–24
- Danish Cup: 2022–23, 2023–24
