= Courtney Strode =

American association football player

Personal information
- Full name: Courtney Strode Liebermann
- Date of birth: 23 June 1998 (age 28)
- Place of birth: San Diego, California, U.S.
- Height: 1.66 m (5 ft 5 in)
- Position: Forward

Team information
- Current team: FK Austria Wien
- Number: 9

Senior career*
| Years | Team | Apps | (Gls) |
| 2017 | Växjö DFF | 4 | (3) |
| 2018 | KIF Örebro | 24 | (13) |
| 2019 | Saint-Étienne | 11 | (7) |
| 2019–2020 | Arras | 15 | (7) |
| 2020–2022 | Young Boys | 41 | (24) |
| 2022–2023 | Basel | 14 | (8) |
| 2023–2024 | Young Boys | 17 | (14) |
| 2024–2025 | Young Boys | 21 | (12) |
| 2025-2026 | FK Austria Wien | 22 | (10) |
- * Club domestic league appearances and goals

Courtney Strode is an American soccer player who plays for Austrian Club FK Austria Wien Courtney achieved 2x Top Goal Scorer of Switzerland's Axa Women's Super League 2023-2025. And is the overall Top Goal Scorer in the history of the BSC YB Frauen with having scored 75 goals in 105 official games. In 2025 she won the AWSL Championship with BSC YB Frauen. In 2026 she won both the Austrian Bundesliga Cup and League Championship with FK Austria Wien as well as making it to the Quarterfinals of Europacup and being the Top Goal scorer within her team for all international competitions (Champions League Qualifications and Europacup).

== Personal life ==
Courtney Strode's father is Charles Strode who was a professional tennis player in the 1980s.
