= Jakobsbergs GoIF =

Swedish sports club

- Full name: Jakobsbergs gymnastik- och idrottsförening
- Sport: soccer (earlier) handball
- Based in: Jakobsberg, Sweden
- Arena: Viksjöhallen (handball)

Jakobsbergs GoIF is a sports club in Jakobsberg, Sweden, with handball activity. The men's soccer team merged with FC Järfälla in 1993 and the women's soccer team did the same in 2003.

The club won the Swedish women's soccer national championship in 1977. The club also finished second in 1975, losing the final game against Öxabäcks IF on penalty kicks.
