= Lilie Persson =

Swedish association football player and association football manager

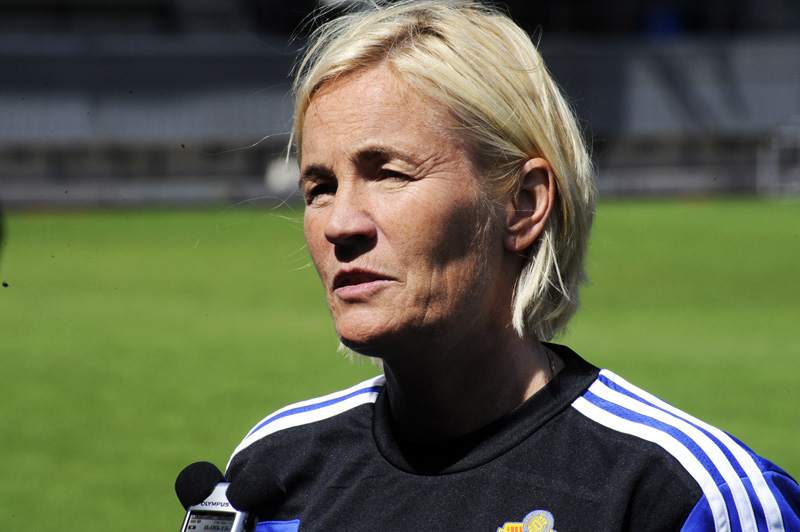

Personal information
- Full name: Birgit Lilie Persson
- Date of birth: 23 April 1966 (age 60)
- Place of birth: Arnäs, Sweden
- Position: Midfielder

Senior career*
Years	Team	Apps	(Gls)
1983–1986	Hammarby Fotboll	218	(28)
- * Club domestic league appearances and goals

Lilie Persson (born 23 April 1966) is a former Swedish footballer who played for most notably for Hammarby Fotboll. After retiring as a player, Persson became the assistant coach of the Sweden women's national football team from 2005 to 2017.

== Honours ==
Hammarby

- Damallsvenskan: 1985
