= Emily Whelan =

Irish international footballer

Personal information
- Full name: Emily Whelan
- Date of birth: 22 August 2002 (age 24)
- Place of birth: Dublin, Ireland
- Height: 1.63 m (5 ft 4 in)
- Position: Forward

Team information
- Current team: Glasgow City
- Number: 11

Youth career
- 2017–2018: Shelbourne Youths

Senior career*
Years	Team	Apps	(Gls)
2018–2021	Shelbourne		(5)
2021–2022	Birmingham City	19	(0)
2022–	Glasgow City	55	(21)

International career^{‡}
2016–2018	Republic of Ireland U-17	17	(7)
2019	Republic of Ireland U-19	3	(0)
2019–	Republic of Ireland	7	(0)
- * Club domestic league appearances and goals as of 01:31, 11 May 2024 (UTC) ‡ National team caps and goals as of 21 September 2021 (UTC)

Emily Whelan (born 22 August 2002) is an Irish footballer who plays for Scottish Women's Premier League club Glasgow City and the Republic of Ireland women's national football team. She is a former Gaelic footballer.

== Career ==
=== Football ===
==== Shelbourne ====
While attending Ardgillan Community College in Balbriggan, Whelan began her career in the Shelbourne Academy and made her debut in the Shelbourne Ladies first-team in August 2018. On 10 November 2018, when she was 16 years old, she was named the best player in the U-17 league and thus the first Continental Tires Women's Under 17 National League Player of the Year.

==== Birmingham City ====
Whelan signed a one-year professional contract with Women's Super League club Birmingham City in September 2021. She made her league debut against Tottenham Hotspur on 4 September 2021.

==== Glasgow City ====
After playing 19 times for Birmingham, who were relegated from the Women's Super League, Whelan transferred to Glasgow City of the Scottish Women's Premier League in July 2022. She made her league debut against Motherwell on 14 August 2022. Whelan scored her first goals against Dundee United on 24 August 2022, scoring in the 9th and 20th minute. She won the 2022-23 Scottish Women's Premier League. Whelan signed a contract extension on 10 May 2024.

==== National team ====
After playing five games for the Irish U-17's team, at 16 years of age, Whelan was called up to play for the Irish senior team against Poland. On 9 October 2018, she made her senior debut as a substitute, in the 86th minute, coming on for Ruesha Littlejohn. On 20 January 2019, she made her second international appearance, after a 76th-minute substitution for Emily Kraft, in a 1–0 defeat by Belgium at the Podoactiva Pinatar Arena Football Centre at San Pedro del Pinatar, Murcia, Spain.

=== International appearances ===
Appearances for national team and year
National team	Year	Apps
Republic of Ireland	2018	1
Republic of Ireland	2019	3
Republic of Ireland	2021	3
Total		7

=== Gaelic football career ===
In her youth until 2017, alongside association football, Whelan played Gaelic Football, for the O'Dwyers GAA, and the Dublin Ladies U-16's.

== Honours ==
Women's National League Awards

- U-17 League Player of the Year (1): 2018

Glasgow City

- Scottish Women's Premier League: 2022–23
