= FC Nordsjælland (women) =

Danish football club

- Full name: Football Club Nordsjælland
- Nickname: The Tigers
- Short name: FCN
- Founded: 2017; 9 years ago
- Ground: Right to Dream Park, Farum
- Capacity: 10,300
- Owner: Pathways Group (99%)
- Chairman: Tom Vernon
- Coach: Amy Harrison
- League: A-Liga
- 2025–26: A-Liga, 4th of 8
- Website: FC Nordsjælland
Home colours	Away colours	Third colours

Football Club Nordsjælland (commonly known as Nordsjælland (lit. 'North Zealand'); previously Farum BK) is a Danish women's football club based in Farum, Denmark. The club plays in A-Liga, the top-flight of the Danish Women's Football League. Like the men's team, they play their home matches at the Right to Dream Park.

== History ==
Farum Idræts Klub (FIK) and Stavnsholt Boldklub merged in January 1991 to form Farum Boldklub. The women's team was established in 1994 and played non-league football. In 2000 the team won the non-league Zealand Series, the fifth tier of the Danish football league system. FC Nordsjælland was founded in 2017, based on the former Farum Boldklub team. However, the team continued as Farum BK until 2019, where Nordsjælland took over the license for the team. In 2018, FC Nordsjælland integrated Farum Boldklub's U18 team to form their women's football branch. The team achieved promotion to A-Liga after only one season in the 1st Division.

== Players ==
=== Current squad ===
As of 17 October 2026

Note: Flags indicate national team as defined under FIFA eligibility rules; some limited exceptions apply. Players may hold more than one non-FIFA nationality.

No.	Pos.	Nation	Player
1	GK	FIN	Ella-Maria Ervasti
2	DF	DEN	Astrid Engsig-Karup
4	DF	RSA	Bongeka Gamede
6	MF	NZL	Grace Wisnewski
7	DF	DEN	Karen Linnebjerg (captain)
9	FW	CIV	Safi N'Sira
10	MF	CIV	Grâce Sery
11	FW	DEN	Clara la Cour
12	FW	EGY	Laila El Behery
13	FW	DEN	Mille Østersø
14	GK	FIN	Helmi Vihervuori
16	MF	NZL	Malia Steinmetz
17	MF	DEN	Simone Qi Andersen
18	FW	DEN	Flora Højer
19	MF	FRO	Kára Sigurðsson

No.	Pos.	Nation	Player
22	MF	DEN	Nellie Mulvad
27	MF	DEN	Signe Antvorskov
29	FW	DEN	Thea Petersen
30	GK	DEN	Hannah Darrell
31	DF	DEN	Carli Scheuer
32	DF	DEN	Josefine Welzel
33	DF	DEN	Hannah Jørgensen
36	MF	DEN	Alberte Mott
39	MF	ISL	Rebekka Brynjarsdottír
40	MF	DEN	Agnete Westberg
41	MF	DEN	Line Tang Pjetursson
43	MF	DEN	Saga Nimb
44	DF	FRO	Sara Benjaminsen
—	MF	RSA	Sibulele Holweni

=== Captains ===
Incomplete

Captaincy	Player
2025–	(Denmark) Karen Linnebjerg
2025	(Denmark) Nikoline Dudek (Australia) Wini Heatley
2023–2024	(Denmark) Emilie Byrnak
2021–2023	(United States) Jessica Davis
–2021	(Denmark) Catrine Gryholt

=== Caps ===
Incomplete

#	Player	Caps
1	(Denmark) Cecilie Larsen	164
2	(Denmark) Karen Linnebjerg	150
	(Denmark) Anna Walter	102
	(Denmark) Nikoline Dudek	100
	(Denmark) Simone Qi Andersen	100
	(Denmark) Emilie Byrnak	81
	(Australia) Wini Heatley	79
	(United States) Jessica Davis	74
	(Denmark) Alberte Mott	50
	(New Zealand) Malia Steinmetz	50
	(Denmark) Kathrine Kühl	50

=== Former players ===
For details of former players, see Category:FC Nordsjælland (women) players.

== Management ==
=== First team ===
As of 27 October 2026

Role	Staff
Head Coach	(Canada) Amy Harrison
Assistant Coach	(Scotland) Louis Britton
Goalkeeper Coach; Analyst	(Denmark) Oliver Foss
Fitness Coach	(Sweden) Tim Stjerna
Mental Coach	(Denmark) Kasper Henriksen
Head of Coaching	(Denmark) Niels Lawaetz
Performance Coach	(England) Ellie Burgess
Analyst	(Denmark) Rasmus Kristensen Bysted
Medical Staff
Head of Medical	(Denmark) Jesper Petersen
Team Doctor	(Denmark) Annie Maria Martin
Physiotherapist	(Denmark) Mie Krog (Norway) Ingrid Hestad

=== Club officials ===
As of 1 July 2026

Role	Staff
Owner	(England) Tom Vernon
Director of Football	(Denmark) Alexander Riget
Sporting Director	(United States) Jessica Davis
Technical Director	Vacant
Operations Coordinator	(Denmark) Anna Mejlhede Dorf Petersen

=== Managers ===
Role	Staff
2026–	(Canada) Amy Harrison
2022–2026	(England) Chris Sargeant
2021–2022	(Canada) Carmelina Moscato
2019–2021	(Denmark) Brian Sørensen

== Honours ==
Incomplete

Nordsjælland honours
Competition	No.	Years
A-Liga	1	(gold) 2023–24
A-Liga	1	(silver) 2024–25
A-Liga	1	(bronze) 2019–20
Danish Cup	3	(gold) 2019–20, 2022–23, 2023–24
Danish Cup	2	(silver) 2024–25, 2025–26

== Seasons ==
As of the 2025–26 season

Key
(gold) Champions	Promotion
(silver) Silver	Relegation
(bronze) Bronze	

Incomplete

Season	Tier	#	W	D	L	F	A	Pts.	Cup
As Farum Boldklub
1994									
1995									
1996									
1996–97									
1997–98									
1998–99									
1999–00	5	1st							
2016–17	5	3rd of 12							
Nordsjælland
2017–18	4	2nd of 11							
2018–19	2								
2019–20	1								
2020–21	1								

== See also ==
- FC Nordsjælland (men's team)
