= Joy Omewa =

Nigerian footballer (born 2002)

Personal information
- Full name: Joy Ogochukwu Omewa
- Date of birth: 1 December 2002 (age 23)
- Place of birth: Osun, Nigeria
- Height: 1.77 m (5 ft 10 in)
- Position: Forward

Team information
- Current team: BK Häcken

Youth career
- 2019–2020: Osun Babes

Senior career*
Years	Team	Apps	(Gls)
2020–2021	Confluence Queens		
2021–2022	B.93	9	(3)
2022–2026	Fortuna Hjørring	85	(52)
2026	Nottingham Forest	9	(3)
2026–	BK Häcken	8	(4)

International career^{‡}
- Nigeria U17
2022	Nigeria U20		
2025–	Nigeria	7	(3)
- * Club domestic league appearances and goals as of 03:19, 30 October 2026 (UTC) ‡ National team caps and goals as of 16 August 2026

Joy Ogochukwu Omewa (born 1 December 2002) is a Nigerian footballer who plays as a forward for Damallsvenskan club BK Häcken and the Nigeria national team.

== Club career ==
Omewa's professional career began in her home country of Nigeria with Confluence Queens prior to arriving in Østerbro, joining B.93 in April 2021 as a collaborative effort between the two clubs. She made her debut for the club on 3 April 2021 in a 0–1 defeat to AaB. During her time with the club, she would make nine appearances while scoring three goals.

=== Fortuna Hjørring ===
In November 2021, Omewa was sold to fellow Danish club Fortuna Hjørring in the Kvindeligaen, the top-flight of women's football in Denmark. During the 2024–25 season, she set herself apart with her scoring efforts, netting 14 goals and four assists in only 17 league games by mid-April. By the end of the 2024–25 season, both her and the club won a domestic double—capturing the Danish Women's League and the Women's Cup. On 13 June 2025, she was recognised as Player of the Season in the Danish Women's League for her performance.

=== Nottingham Forest ===
On 27 January 2026, Omewa was signed by Women's Super League 2 club Nottingham Forest until the end of the 2025–26 season. She made her debut for the club on 1 February, starting the game and scoring one goal in a 5–1 loss to Birmingham City. Nottingham Forest confirmed on 3 June that she would depart the club at the end of the season.

=== BK Häcken ===
Swedish club BK Häcken announced in July 2026 they had completed the signing of Omewa on a contract until 2029.

== International career ==
Omewa has previously been called up to the Nigerian U-17 and U-20 squads. She made her senior debut for Nigeria on 24 October 2025, coming on as a substitute in Nigeria's 2–0 away victory over Benin in a 2026 Women's Africa Cup of Nations qualifier. She scored her first and second goals for the national team on 8 June 2026 in a 3–0 win over Senegal in a friendly.

== Career statistics ==
=== Club ===
As of match played 29 October 2026

Appearances and goals by club, season and competition
Club	Season	League			National Cup (Note: Includes appearances in Danish Women's Cup)		Continental		Other		Total	
Club	Season	Division	Apps	Goals	Apps	Goals	Apps	Goals	Apps	Goals	Apps	Goals
B.93	2020–21	Danish 1st Division	0	0	0	0	—		9 (Note: Appearances in the 2020–21 Danish Women's 1st Division play-offs)	3	9	3
B.93	Total		0	0	0	0	—		9	3	9	3
Fortuna Hjørring	2021–22	Danish League	7	3	0	0	—		—		7	3
Fortuna Hjørring	2022–23	Danish League	21	8	0	0	2 (Note: Appearances in the UEFA Women's Champions League)	0	—		23	8
Fortuna Hjørring	2023–24	Danish League	19	6	0	0	—		—		19	6
Fortuna Hjørring	2024–25	Danish League	24	22	4	3	—		—		28	25
Fortuna Hjørring	2025–26	A-Liga	14	13	0	0	8 (Note: Four appearances and three goals in the UEFA Women's Champions League, four appearances and four goals in the UEFA Women's Europa Cup)	7	—		22	20
Fortuna Hjørring	Total		85	52	4	3	10	7	0	0	99	62
Nottingham Forest	2025–26	Women's Super League 2	9	3	0	0	—		—		9	3
BK Häcken	2026	Damallsvenskan	8	4	—		3	0	—		11	4
Career total			102	59	4	6	10	7	9	3	128	72

=== International ===
As of match played 8 June 2026

Appearances and goals by national team and year
National team	Year	Apps	Goals
Nigeria	2025	2	0
Nigeria	2026	4	3
Total		6	3

Scores and results list Nigeria's goal tally first, score column indicates score after each Omewa goal.

No.	Date	Venue	Opponent	Score	Result	Competition
1.	8 June 2026	Remo Stars Stadium, Ikenne, Nigeria	Senegal	1–0	3–0	Friendly
2.	8 June 2026	Remo Stars Stadium, Ikenne, Nigeria	Senegal	2–0	3–0	Friendly
3.	5 August 2026	Rabat Olympic Stadium, Rabat, Morocco	Egypt	6–2	6–2	2026 Women's Africa Cup of Nations

== Honours ==
Fortuna Hjørring

- Danish League: 2024–25
- Danish Cup: 2021–22, 2024–25

Individual

- Danish League Player of the Season: 2024–25
