= 2025 Hammarby Fotboll (women) season =

Hammarby
2025 season
- Head coach: Martin Sjögren
- Stadium: Hammarby IP, Skanstull; 3Arena, Johanneshov
- Damallsvenskan: 2nd
- Svenska Cupen: Group stage
- Champions League: Second qualifying round
- Europa Cup: Final
- Top goalscorer: League: Ellen Wangerheim (17); All: Ellen Wangerheim (23)
- Highest home attendance: 6,372 v Malmö; Damallsvenskan; 6 September 2025
- Lowest home attendance: 800 v Brann; Europa Cup; 7 October 2025
- Average home league attendance: 2,514
- Biggest win: 7–0 v Alingsås (H); Damallsvenskan; 8 August 2025; 7–0 v Växjö (A); Damallsvenskan; 28 September 2025
- Biggest defeat: 0–2 v Kristianstad (A); Damallsvenskan; 24 May 2025; 0–2 v Häcken (A); 11 October 2025
Home colours	Away colours

The 2025 season is Hammarby IF's fifth consecutive season and 31st overall season in the Damallsvenskan, the top flight of women's football in Sweden. Alongside competing in the Damallsvenskan, Hammarby is also competing in the Svenska Cupen, as well as in the qualifying rounds of the UEFA Women's Europa Cup (UWEC) after being knocked out of the UEFA Women's Champions League (UWCL) in the qualifying rounds.

== Squad ==
As of 6 January 2026

Note: Flags indicate national team as defined under FIFA eligibility rules; some limited exceptions apply. Players may hold more than one non-FIFA nationality.

No.	Pos.	Nation	Player
2	MF	NOR	Emilie Bragstad
3	DF	SWE	Lotta Ökvist
5	DF	DEN	Simone Boye Sørensen
6	MF	JPN	Asato Miyagawa
7	MF	NOR	Emilie Joramo
8	MF	FIN	Vilma Koivisto
9	FW	NOR	Anna Jøsendal
10	MF	SWE	Bea Sprung
11	FW	SWE	Ellen Wangerheim
15	MF	SWE	Sofia Reidy
17	DF	SWE	Stina Lennartsson
18	DF	SWE	Alice Carlsson (captain)

No.	Pos.	Nation	Player
20	FW	NOR	Vilde Hasund
22	MF	SWE	Hannah Sjödahl
23	DF	SWE	Athinna Persson Lundgren
25	MF	SWE	Fanny Peterson
27	MF	SWE	Stella Maiquez
28	GK	GER	Melina Loeck
29	GK	SWE	Moa Edrud
—	GK	SWE	Emma Holmgren

== Transfers ==
=== Transfers in ===
Date	Position	Nationality	Name	From	Ref.
27 November 2024	MF	(Norway)	Emilie Bragstad	(Germany) Bayer Leverkusen	
24 January 2025	MF	(Sweden)	Vera Blom	(United States) Florida Gators	
25 January 2025	GK	(Sweden)	Emma Holmgren	(Spain) Levante	
14 July 2025	MF	(Finland)	Vilma Koivisto	(Sweden) Linköping FC	
23 July 2025	DF	(Sweden)	Sofia Reidy	(Sweden) Kristianstads DFF	
26 July 2025	MF	(Sweden)	Bea Sprung	(Sweden) Rosengård	
22 August 2025	MF	(Sweden)	Hannah Sjödahl	(Sweden) Vittsjö GIK	

=== Loans in ===
Date	Position	Nationality	Name	From	Ref.
2 August 2025	GK	(Germany)	Melina Loeck	(England) Brighton & Hove Albion	

=== Transfers out ===
Date	Position	Nationality	Name	To	Ref.
27 November 2024	DF	(Sweden)	Jonna Andersson	(Sweden) Linköping FC	
17 January 2025	FW	(Sweden)	Emma Westin	(Scotland) Celtic	
25 January 2025	DF	(Finland)	Eva Nyström	(England) West Ham United	
27 January 2025	MF	(Sweden)	Ellen Gibson	(Canada) Ottawa Rapid	
9 June 2025	FW	(Sweden)	Klara Folkesson	(Belgium) RSC Anderlecht	
10 June 2025	MF	(Sweden)	Lykke Ihrfelt	(United States) Dartmouth Big Green	
11 June 2025	MF	(Switzerland)	Smilla Vallotto	(Germany) VfL Wolfsburg	
31 July 2025	DF	(Sweden)	Bella Andersson	(Spain) Real Madrid	
2 August 2025	FW	(Norway)	Thea Sørbo	(Sweden) FC Rosengård	
5 September 2025	GK	(Finland)	Anna Tamminen	(England) Newcastle United	
5 September 2025	FW	(Norway)	Cathinka Tandberg	(England) Tottenham Hotspur	
5 January 2026	Right-back	(Sweden)	Smilla Holmberg	(England) Arsenal	
5 January 2026	Left-back	(Norway)	Julie Blakstad	(England) Tottenham Hotspur (Note: She joined Tottenham upon the expiration of her contract.)	

=== Loans out ===
Date	Position	Nationality	Name	To	Ref.
22 July 2025	MF	(Sweden)	Vera Blom	IF Brommapojkarna	

== Friendlies ==
7 December 2024 Friendly	Hammarby IF	1–3	Hammarby TFF P15	Stockholm
10:30		Report		Stadium: Hammarby IP; Attendance: 52; Referee: Amanda Nylund Karman
Note: This match was a friendly between Hammarby's women's first team and the under-15 boys' academy team.

2 February 2025 Friendly	Linköping FC	0–1	Hammarby IF	Linköping
		Report		Stadium: Linköping Arena

14 February 2025 Friendly	Hammarby IF (Sweden)	1–3	(Norway) SK Brann	Marbella
		Report		Stadium: Banús Football Centre

== Damallsvenskan ==
=== League table ===
Pos	Team	Pld	W	D	L	GF	GA	GD	Pts	Qualification or relegation
1	BK Häcken (C)	26	21	1	4	86	17	+69	64	Qualification for the Champions League second round
2	Hammarby IF	26	19	3	4	72	19	+53	60	Qualification for the Champions League second round
3	Malmö FF	26	18	3	5	58	27	+31	57	Qualification for the Champions League second round
4	Djurgårdens IF	26	15	5	6	49	38	+11	50	
5	IFK Norrköping	26	13	7	6	37	33	+4	46	

Source: Swedish Football Association (in Swedish)
Rules for classification: 1) Points; 2) Goal difference; 3) Number of goals scored; 4) Head-to-head points; 5) Head-to-head goal difference; 6) Head-to-head away goals scored
(C) Champions

=== Results summary ===
Overall								Home						Away					
Pld	W	D	L	GF	GA	GD	Pts	W	D	L	GF	GA	GD	W	D	L	GF	GA	GD
26	19	3	4	72	19	+53	60	13	0	0	40	6	+34	6	3	4	32	13	+19

Last updated: 16 November 2025.
Source: SvFF

=== Results by matchweek ===
Round	1	2	3	4	5	6	7	8	9	10	11	12	13	14	15	16	17	18	19	20	21	22	23	24	25	26
Ground	H	A	H	A	A	H	A	H	A	H	H	A	H	A	H	A	H	H	A	A	H	A	A	H	A	H
Result	W	W	W	W	D	W	L	W	L	W	W	D	W	W	W	D	W	W	L	W	W	L	W	W	W	W
Position	2	1	1	1	1	1	1	1	2	1	1	2	2	2	1	3	1	1	1	1	2	2	2	2	2	2

Source: SvFF
A = Away; H = Home; W = Win; D = Draw; L = Loss

=== Results ===
23 March 2025 Matchweek 1	Hammarby IF	4–1	Växjö DFF	Stockholm
15:00	Andersson (yellow card) 11'; Wangerheim 28', 52'; Holmberg 31', 43'	Report	Bodin 47' (yellow card) 74'	Stadium: Hammarby IP; Attendance: 2,174; Referee: Tess Olofsson

29 March 2025 Matchweek 2	Linköping FC	0–5	Hammarby IF	Linköping
14:00		Report	Holmberg 15'; Wangerheim 20', 53', 62'; Lennartsson (yellow card) 47'; Nadim 88'	Stadium: Linköping Arena; Attendance: 867; Referee: Selma Griberg

14 April 2025 Matchweek 3	Hammarby IF	4–0	FC Rosengård	Stockholm
19:00	Blakstad 4'; Wangerheim 18'; Holmberg 41'; Hasund 44'; Bragstad (yellow card) 82'; Persson Lundgren (yellow card) 88'	Report	Pelgander (yellow card) 79'; Andersson (yellow card) 83'	Stadium: Hammarby IP; Attendance: 2,069; Referee: Lovisa Johansson

19 April 2025 Matchweek 4	IF Brommapojkarna	1–4	Hammarby IF	Stockholm
14:00	Thörnqvist (yellow card) 52'; Engström 88'	Report	Tandberg 33'; Andersson 62'; Vallotto 72'; Hasund 77'	Stadium: Grimsta IP; Attendance: 435; Referee: Eva Svärdsudd

26 April 2024 Matchweek 5	Malmö FF	1–1	Hammarby IF	Malmö
15:00	Mårtensson (yellow card) 78'; D'Aquila 88'	Report	Miyagawa (yellow card) 56'; Wangerheim 58'; Lennartsson 62'	Stadium: Eleda Stadion; Attendance: 1,918; Referee: Selma Griberg

5 May 2025 Matchweek 6	Hammarby IF	1–0	BK Häcken	Stockholm
19:00	Blakstad 54'; Edrud (yellow card) 64'	Report	Caroline Wickenheiser (yellow card) 44'; Östlund (yellow card) 84'	Stadium: Hammarby IP; Attendance: 2,016; Referee: Hanna Laajanen

10 May 2025 Matchweek 7	AIK Stockholm	1–0	Hammarby IF	Stockholm
13:00	Dahlqvist 79'; Papadopoulos (yellow card) 85'	Report	Andersson (yellow card) 9'	Stadium: Skytteholms IP; Attendance: 1,338; Referee: Cecilia Ekwall

17 May 2025 Matchweek 8	Hammarby IF	2–1	Piteå IF	Stockholm
13:00	Vallotto (yellow card) 26'; Blakstad 41'; Wangerheim 50'	Report	Holm (yellow card) 26'; Green (yellow card) 53'; Viklund (yellow card) 82'; Carlsson 88'	Stadium: Hammarby IP; Attendance: 1,216; Referee: Selma Griberg

24 May 2025 Matchweek 9	Kristianstads DFF	2–0	Hammarby IF	Kristianstad
15:00	Sayer 47'; Tryggvadóttir 85'	Report	Bragstad (yellow card) 4'	Stadium: Kristianstads Fotbollsarena; Attendance: 585; Referee: Lovisa Johansson

8 June 2025 Matchweek 10	Hammarby IF	3–2	Vittsjö GIK	Stockholm
12:00	Wangerheim 46', 66'; Hasund 74'	Report	Klinga 12' (yellow card) 36'; Persson 90'	Stadium: Hammarby IP; Attendance: 1,811; Referee: Ulrica Löv

16 June 2025 Matchweek 11	Hammarby IF	2–1	Djurgårdens IF	Stockholm
19:00	Miyagawa 3'; Joramo (yellow card) 42'; Blakstad 90'	Report	Åsland 77'	Stadium: Hammarby IP; Attendance: 3,312; Referee: Tess Olofsson

22 June 2025 Matchweek 12	IFK Norrköping	2–2	Hammarby IF	Norrköping
16:00	Rehnberg 1'; Handfast 36'	Report	Joramo 26'; Nadim 88'; Lennartsson (yellow card) 90+4'	Stadium: Nya Parken; Attendance: 1,323; Referee: Eva Svärdsudd

8 August 2025 Matchweek 13	Hammarby IF	7–0	Alingsås IF	Stockholm
19:00	Jøsendal 8'; Wangerheim 27'; Blakstad 41', 45+1', 56', 83'	Report	Barth (yellow card) 70'	Stadium: Hammarby IP; Attendance: 1,722; Referee: Isabelle Svensson

12 August 2025 Matchweek 16	FC Rosengård	2–2	Hammarby IF	Malmö
19:00	Imo 28'; Sørbo 40'; Johansson (yellow card) 90+2'; Leshnak Murphy (yellow card) 90+6'	Report	Hasund 47'; Koivisto 50'	Stadium: Malmö IP; Attendance: 787; Referee: George Jansizian

16 August 2025 Matchweek 14	Piteå IF	0–5	Hammarby IF	Luleå
13:00		Report	Wangerheim 3', 69'; Bragstad 21'; Jøsendal 37'; Carlsson 90+1'	Stadium: JIABvallen; Attendance: 793; Referee: Eva Svärdsudd

22 August 2025 Matchweek 15	Hammarby IF	1–0	Kristianstads DFF	Stockholm
19:00	Blakstad 10'; Joramo (yellow card) 79'; Lennartsson (yellow card) 84'	Report		Stadium: Hammarby IP; Attendance: 1,096; Referee: Hanna Laajanen

6 September 2025 Matchweek 17	Hammarby IF	2–1	Malmö FF	Stockholm
13:00	Wangerheim 10' (yellow card) 90+3'; Blakstad 34'	Report	M. Persson (yellow card) 60'; N. Persson 88'	Stadium: 3Arena; Attendance: 6,372; Referee: Lovisa Johansson

13 September 2025 Matchweek 18	Hammarby IF	3–0	Linköping FC	Stockholm
15:00	Koivisto 13'; Holmberg 43', 49'	Report		Stadium: Hammarby IP; Attendance: 1,783; Referee: Amane Kandas

22 September 2025 Matchweek 19	Djurgårdens IF	2–1	Hammarby IF	Stockholm
19:00	Wahlström 5'; Koivunen (yellow card) 30'; Watanabe (yellow card) 60' (goal) 90+5'; Lobanova (yellow card) 77'	Report	Miyagawa 34'; Boye Sørensen (yellow card) 43'	Stadium: Stockholm Olympic Stadium; Attendance: 3,633; Referee: Hanna Laajanen

28 September 2025 Matchweek 20	Växjö DFF	0–7	Hammarby IF	Växjö
16:00		Report	Wangerheim 20'; Sprung 45'; Blakstad 50', 51'; Hasund 57'; Joramo 66'; Jøsendal 90+2'	Stadium: Spiris Arena; Attendance: 1,306; Referee: Toni Galić

3 October 2025 Matchweek 21	Hammarby IF	1–0	AIK Stockholm	Stockholm
19:00	Sprung 3'; Wangerheim (yellow card) 83'	Report	Plan (yellow card) 48' (yellow-red card) 90+4'; Selin (yellow card) 80'	Stadium: Hammarby IP; Attendance: 2,260; Referee: Eva Svärdsudd

12 October 2025 Matchweek 22	BK Häcken	2–0	Hammarby IF	Gothenburg
15:00	Tindell 12'; Anvegård 25'	Report		Stadium: Bravida Arena; Attendance: 4,814; Referee: Hanna Laajanen

19 October 2025 Matchweek 23	Vittsjö GIK	0–2	Hammarby IF	Vittsjö
16:00	Rewucha (yellow card) 86'	Report	Hasund 67' (yellow card) 71'; Joramo 90+4'	Stadium: Vittsjö IP; Attendance: 712; Referee: George Jansizian

2 November 2025 Matchweek 24	Hammarby IF	4–0	IFK Norrköping	Stockholm
15:00	Blakstad 31'; Jøsendal 54', 64'; Joramo 67'; Wangerheim 72'	Report		Stadium: Hammarby IP; Attendance: 1,934; Referee: Selma Griberg

8 November 2025 Matchweek 25	Alingsås IF	0–3	Hammarby IF	Alingsås
13:00		Report	Miyagawa 10'; Blakstad 36'; Bragstad 69'	Stadium: Mjörnvallen; Attendance: 415; Referee: Amane Kandas

16 November 2025 Matchweek 26	Hammarby IF	6–0	IF Brommapojkarna	Stockholm
14:00	Blakstad 17'; Hasund 35', 49'; Koivisto 61'; Wangerheim 64'; Maiquez 82'	Report		Stadium: Hammarby IP; Attendance: 1,673; Referee: Tess Olofsson

== Svenska Cupen ==
=== Third round ===
17 September 2025 Third round	Sollentuna FK	0–5	Hammarby IF	Sollentuna
19:00		Report	Myrén 21'; Peterson 24'; Boye Sørensen 39'; Persson Lundgren (red card); Holmberg 86'; Blakstad 90+1'	Stadium: Sollentunavallen; Attendance: 250; Referee: Olivia Wickström

=== Group stage ===
Pos	Team	Pld	W	D	L	GF	GA	GD	Pts	Qualification	HAM	ROS	VÄX	VIT
1	Hammarby IF	3	2	1	0	9	2	+7	7	Advance to the semi-finals			2–2	3–0
2	FC Rosengård	3	1	1	1	4	5	−1	4		0–3			
3	Växjö DFF	3	0	2	1	4	7	−3	2			0–3		
4	Vittsjö GIK	3	0	2	1	3	6	−3	2			1–1	2–2	

Source: Swedish Football Association
Rules for classification: Tiebreakers

23 February 2026	FC Rosengård	v	Hammarby IF	Malmö
19:00		Report		Stadium: Malmö IP; Referee: George Jansizian

12 March 2026	Hammarby IF	v	Växjö DFF	Stockholm
19:00		Report		Stadium: Hammarby IP

16 March 2026	Hammarby IF	v	Vittsjö GIK	Stockholm
19:00		Report		Stadium: Hammarby IP

== UEFA Women's Champions League ==
=== Second qualifying round ===
27 August 2025 Second qualifying round	Hammarby IF (Sweden)	5–4	(Ukraine) Metalist Kharkiv	Stockholm
19:00	Wangerheim 5', 60'; Tandberg 62', 90+3'; Blakstad 69'; Lennartsson (yellow card) 85'	Report	Molodiuk 22'; Petryk (yellow card) 45+2'; Zaborovets 55'; Bragstad 80' (o.g.); Andrukhiv 90'	Stadium: Grimsta IP; Attendance: 1,964; Referee: Alexandra Collin (France)

30 August 2025 Second qualifying round	Manchester United (England)	1–0	(Sweden) Hammarby IF	Stockholm
19:00	Toone (yellow card) 37'; Terland 61'; Riviere (yellow card) 79'; Bizet (yellow card) 88'	Report	Blakstad (yellow card) 37'; Miyagawa (yellow card) 45+2'; Tandberg (yellow card) 75'	Stadium: Stockholm Arena; Attendance: 5,546; Referee: Michaela Pachtová (Czech Republic)

== UEFA Women's Europa Cup ==
=== Second qualifying round ===
7 October 2025 Second qualifying round	Hammarby IF (Sweden)	4–1	(Norway) SK Brann	Stockholm
22:16	Hasund 43'; Wangerheim 55', 56', 66'	Report	Gaupset (yellow card) 25'; Davidson 78'; Þórisdóttir (yellow card) 88'	Stadium: Grimsta IP; Attendance: 800; Referee: Catarina Campos (Portugal)

16 October 2025 Second qualifying round	SK Brann (Norway)	1–1	(Sweden) Hammarby IF	Bergen
18:00	Haugland (yellow card) 34'; Lovera 36'; Davidson (yellow card) 42'	Report	Blakstad 68'; Persson Lundgren (yellow card) 89'	Stadium: Brann Stadion; Attendance: 1,457; Referee: Désirée Grundbacher (Switzerland)

=== Round of 16 ===
12 November 2025 Round of 16	Ajax (Netherlands)	1–3	(Sweden) Hammarby IF	Duivendrecht
19:30	Van de Velde 74'	Report	Blakstad 19'; Jøsendal 52'; Wangerheim 71'	Stadium: De Toekomst; Attendance: 711; Referee: Alexandra Collin (France)

20 November 2025 Round of 16	Hammarby IF (Sweden)	3–1	(Netherlands) Ajax	Stockholm
19:00	Miyagawa 60'; Holmberg 68'; Hasund 84'	Report	Smits 5'	Stadium: 3Arena; Attendance: 1,457; Referee: Ivana Martinčić (Croatia)

=== Quarter-finals ===
February 2026 Quarter-finals	Sporting CP (Portugal)	0–1	(Sweden) Hammarby IF	Alcochete
20:45		Report	Joramo 69'	Stadium: Stadium Aurelio Pereira; Attendance: Referee: Michalina Diakow (Poland)

February 2026 Quarter-finals	Hammarby IF (Sweden)	0-1(5-4p)	(Portugal) Sporting CP	Stockholm

== Squad statistics ==
As of 20 November 2025

Starting appearances are listed first, followed by substitute appearances after the + symbol where applicable.

No.	Pos	Nat	Player	Total		Damallsvenskan		Svenska Cupen		Champions League		Europa Cup	
No.	Pos	Nat	Player	Apps	Goals	Apps	Goals	Apps	Goals	Apps	Goals	Apps	Goals
2	MF	(Norway) NOR	Emilie Bragstad	31	2	18+7	2	0+1	0	1	0	4	0
3	DF	(Sweden) SWE	Lotta Ökvist	7	0	0+6	0	0	0	1	0	0	0
4	DF	(Sweden) SWE	Thea Eriksson	1	0	0	0	0+1	0	0	0	0	0
5	DF	(Denmark) DEN	Simone Boye Sørensen	13	0	7	0	1	0	1	0	1+3	0
6	MF	(Japan) JPN	Asato Miyagawa	28	4	22+1	3	0	0	1	0	3+1	1
7	MF	(Norway) NOR	Emilie Joramo	31	3	23+2	3	0	0	2	0	4	0
8	MF	(Finland) FIN	Vilma Koivisto	19	2	8+4	2	0+1	0	1+1	0	2+2	0
9	FW	(Norway) NOR	Anna Jøsendal	28	6	13+9	5	0	0	2	0	3+1	1
10	MF	(Sweden) SWE	Bea Sprung	18	2	4+9	2	0	0	0+2	0	0+3	0
11	FW	(Sweden) SWE	Ellen Wangerheim	31	23	24+1	17	0	0	2	2	4	4
15	MF	(Sweden) SWE	Lykke Ihrfelt	0	0	0	0	0	0	0	0	0	0
15	MF	(Sweden) SWE	Sofia Reidy	16	0	3+8	0	1	0	1	0	0+3	0
17	DF	(Sweden) SWE	Stina Lennartsson	28	0	16+6	0	0	0	1+1	0	4	0
18	DF	(Sweden) SWE	Alice Carlsson	31	1	23+2	1	0	0	2	0	4	0
20	FW	(Norway) NOR	Vilde Hasund	30	10	22+2	8	0	0	1+1	0	3+1	2
21	MF	(Sweden) SWE	Vera Blom	2	0	0+2	0	0	0	0	0	0	0
22	MF	(Sweden) SWE	Hannah Sjödahl	4	0	0+3	0	1	0	0	0	0	0
23	DF	(Sweden) SWE	Athinna Persson Lundgren	14	0	2+10	0	1	0	0	0	0+1	0
24	MF	(Sweden) SWE	Stina Myrén	1	0	0	0	1	0	0	0	0	0
25	DF	(Sweden) SWE	Sally Nylén	2	0	0+1	0	1	0	0	0	0	0
25	MF	(Sweden) SWE	Fanny Peterson	8	0	1+5	0	1	0	0	0	0+1	0
27	MF	(Sweden) SWE	Stella Maiquez	6	1	0+4	1	1	0	0	0	0+1	0
28	GK	(Germany) GER	Melina Loeck	16	0	11	0	0	0	1	0	4	0
29	GK	(Sweden) SWE	Moa Edrud	9	0	8	0	1	0	0	0	0	0
31	DF	(Sweden) SWE	Smilla Holmberg	33	7	26	6	1	0	2	0	4	1
41	FW	(Norway) NOR	Julie Blakstad	33	18	26	15	0+1	0	2	1	4	2
43	MF	(Sweden) SWE	Doris Petz	1	0	0+1	0	0	0	0	0	0	0
Players away from the club on loan
16	FW	(Japan) JPN	Suzu Amano	0	0	0	0	0	0	0	0	0	0
Players who left the club during the season
1	GK	(Finland) FIN	Anna Tamminen	7	0	7	0	0	0	0	0	0	0
4	FW	(Norway) NOR	Thea Sørbo	0	0	0	0	0	0	0	0	0	0
8	MF	(Sweden) SWE	Ellen Gibson	0	0	0	0	0	0	0	0	0	0
8	FW	(Denmark) DEN	Nadia Nadim	7	2	1+6	2	0	0	0	0	0	0
10	MF	(Switzerland) SUI	Smilla Vallotto	12	1	11+1	1	0	0	0	0	0	0
13	DF	(Finland) FIN	Eva Nyström	0	0	0	0	0	0	0	0	0	0
14	DF	(Sweden) SWE	Bella Andersson	11	1	6+5	1	0	0	0	0	0	0
19	FW	(Norway) NOR	Cathinka Tandberg	13	3	4+7	1	0	0	1+1	2	0	0
23	FW	(Sweden) SWE	Emma Westin	0	0	0	0	0	0	0	0	0	0
25	DF	(Sweden) SWE	Jonna Andersson	0	0	0	0	0	0	0	0	0	0

- Source: Swedish Football Association

== See also ==
- 2025 Hammarby Fotboll season
