= 2025–26 Svenska Cupen (women) group stage =

2025–26 Svenska Cupen group stage
Tournament details
- Country: Sweden
- Dates: 14 February 2025 – 16 March 2026
- Teams: 16
- Semi-finals: Djurgården; Häcken; Hammarby; Kristianstad

Tournament statistics
- Matches played: 24
- Goals scored: 87 (3.63 per match)
- Attendance: 5,776 (241 per match)
- Top goal scorer(s): Therese Åsland (4 goals)
- Goals scored in penalty shootouts not included.

The 2025–26 Svenska Cupen Damer group stage was the fourth round of the 44th and current iteration of the Svenska Cupen, the Swedish national women's football cup competition. The group stage consisted of four groups of four teams, the winners of which advanced to the semi-finals.

BK Häcken, Djurgårdens IF, Hammarby IF and Kristianstads DFF advanced to the semi-finals, having each won their respective groups.

== Group 1 ==
Pos	Team	Pld	W	D	L	GF	GA	GD	Pts	Qualification	HÄK	AIK	LIN	GEF
1	BK Häcken	3	3	0	0	17	0	+17	9	Advance to the semi-finals		3–0	3–0	
2	AIK	3	2	0	1	3	4	−1	6				1–0	
3	Linköping FC	3	1	0	2	4	4	0	3					4–0
4	Gefle IF	3	0	0	3	1	17	−16	0		0–11	1–2		

Source: Swedish Football Association
Rules for classification: Tiebreakers

14 February 2026	Gefle IF	1–2	AIK	Gävle
15:00	Törnros 1'	Report	Garcia 75'; Björk 82'	Stadium: Gavlevallen; Referee: Camilla Friberg

20 February 2026	AIK	1–0	Linköping FC	Stockholm
19:00	Björk 10'	Report		Stadium: Skytteholms IP; Attendance: 237; Referee: Hanna Laajanen

23 February 2026	Gefle IF	0–11	BK Häcken	Gävle
19:00		Report	Nyström 8', 70'; Pálmadóttir 10'; Selerud 18'; Chinzimu 27', 74'; Akgün 30'; Schröder 38', 44'; Karlsson 83'; Ayinde 88'	Stadium: Gavlevallen; Attendance: 265; Referee: Elias Ekström

11 March 2026	BK Häcken	3–0	Linköping FC	Gothenburg
19:00	Schröder 17'; Tindell 38'; Pálmadóttir 63'	Report		Stadium: Nordic Wellness Arena; Attendance: 338; Referee: George Jansizian

15 March 2026	Linköping FC	4–0	Gefle	Linköping
13:00	Kitamura 20'; Viklund 25'; Lundin 45+4'; Fjellström 86'	Report		Stadium: Linköping Arena; Attendance: 138; Referee: Olivia Wickström

15 March 2026	BK Häcken	3–0	AIK	Gothenburg
13:00	Jusu Bah 12', 69', 79'	Report		Stadium: Nordic Wellness Arena; Attendance: 503; Referee: Lovisa Johansson

== Group 2 ==
Pos	Team	Pld	W	D	L	GF	GA	GD	Pts	Qualification	HAM	ROS	VÄX	VIT
1	Hammarby IF	3	2	1	0	9	2	+7	7	Advance to the semi-finals			2–2	3–0
2	FC Rosengård	3	1	1	1	4	5	−1	4		0–3			
3	Växjö DFF	3	0	2	1	4	7	−3	2			0–3		
4	Vittsjö GIK	3	0	2	1	3	6	−3	2			1–1	2–2	

Source: Swedish Football Association
Rules for classification: Tiebreakers

14 February 2026	Vittsjö GIK	1–1	FC Rosengård	Hässleholm
17:00	Klinga 20'	Report	Pobegaylo 90+2'	Stadium: Österås IP; Referee: Dino Demo

21 February 2026	Vittsjö GIK	2–2	Växjö DFF	Hässleholm
15:00	Wäglund 81'; Clegg 90+1'	Report	Nilsson 10', 90+4'	Stadium: Österås IP; Attendance: 78; Referee: Lovisa Johansson

23 February 2026	FC Rosengård	0–4	Hammarby IF	Malmö
19:00		Report	Hasund 21'; Sørum 25'; Joramo 79'; Nyhagen 90+1'	Stadium: Malmö IP; Referee: George Jansizian
Note: FC Rosengård's supporters' group, Forza Rosengård, boycotted this match and all future FC Rosengård A-team matches in protest over the club being sold to British company Crux Football.

12 March 2026	Hammarby IF	2–2	Växjö DFF	Stockholm
19:00	Sørum 40', 53'	Report	Swedman 22', 25'	Stadium: Hammarby IP; Attendance: 651; Referee: Hanna Laajanen

16 March 2026	Växjö DFF	0–3	FC Rosengård	Växjö
19:00		Report	Johansson 24', 60'; Smith 72'	Stadium: Sportfältet Teleborg; Referee: Dino Demo

16 March 2026	Hammarby IF	3–0	Vittsjö GIK	Stockholm
19:00	Rehnberg 6', 66'; Peterson 88'	Report		Stadium: Hammarby IP; Attendance: 568; Referee: Tess Olofsson

== Group 3 ==
Pos	Team	Pld	W	D	L	GF	GA	GD	Pts	Qualification	KRI	PIT	MAL	UME
1	Kristianstads DFF	3	2	1	0	6	3	+3	7	Advance to the semi-finals		3–2		
2	Piteå IF	3	2	0	1	9	5	+4	6					4–0
3	Malmö FF	3	1	0	2	7	7	0	3		1–3	2–3		
4	Umeå IK	3	0	1	2	1	8	−7	1		0–0		1–4	

Source: Swedish Football Association
Rules for classification: Tiebreakers

15 February 2026	Malmö FF	2–3	Piteå IF	Malmö
13:00	Skoog 34'; 88' (o.g.)	Report	Matsubara 58'; Edlund 70'; Hellekant 87'	Stadium: Malmö IP; Attendance: 376; Referee: Lovisa Johansson

16 February 2026	Umeå IK	0–0	Kristianstads DFF	Umeå
19:00		Report		Stadium: Nolia Arena; Attendance: 103; Referee: Anastasia Oberlauf Poopuu

21 February 2026	Umeå IK	1–4	Malmö FF	Umeå
13:00	Westbom 54'	Report	D'Aquila 29'; Skoog 33'; Sayer 53'; Petrović 90+1'	Stadium: Nolia Arena; Attendance: 112; Referee: Hugo Evebring

22 February 2026	Kristianstads DFF	3–2	Piteå IF	Kristianstad
13:00	Boama 36'; Sigurjónsdóttir 38', 68' (pen.)	Report	Matsubara 62'; Hellekant 69'	Stadium: Kristianstads Fotbollsarena; Attendance: 180; Referee: Dino Demo

14 March 2026	Piteå IF	4–0	Umeå IK	Piteå
13:00	Sampson 45+2', 62'; Ekblom 51'; Hellekant 72'	Report		Stadium: LF Arena; Attendance: 507; Referee: Eva Svärdsudd

14 March 2026	Malmö FF	1–3	Kristianstads DFF	Malmö
13:00	Carlsson 84'	Report	Líf Boama 16'; Ekengren 54'; Michelle De Jongh 90'	Stadium: Malmö IP; Attendance: 461; Referee: Selma Griberg

== Group 4 ==
Pos	Team	Pld	W	D	L	GF	GA	GD	Pts	Qualification	DJU	NOR	BRO	ALI
1	Djurgårdens IF	3	3	0	0	6	2	+4	9	Advance to the semi-finals		4–2	1–0	
2	IFK Norrköping	3	2	0	1	5	5	0	6				1–0	2–1
3	IF Brommapojkarna	3	1	0	2	7	2	+5	3					7–0
4	Alingsås IF	3	0	0	3	1	10	−9	0		0–1			

Source: Swedish Football Association
Rules for classification: Tiebreakers

14 February 2026	Djurgårdens IF	1–0	IF Brommapojkarna	Stockholm
12:00	Renmark 65'	Report		Stadium: 3Arena; Attendance: 756; Referee: Eva Svärdsudd

15 February 2026	IFK Norrköping	2–1	Alingsås IF	Norrköping
17:00	Karlernäs 14'; Bárdardóttir 86'	Report	Svanström 77'	Stadium: Idrottsparken; Attendance: 126; Referee: Linnéa Wallin

22 February 2026	Alingsås IF	0–1	Djurgårdens IF	Alingsås
15:00		Report	Åsland 17' (pen.)	Stadium: Gerdskenvallen; Attendance: 122; Referee: Camilla Friberg

22 February 2026	IFK Norrköping	1–0	IF Brommapojkarna	Norrköping
15:00	Karlernäs 34'	Report		Stadium: Idrottsparken; Referee: Paul Shamoun

14 March 2026	IF Brommapojkarna	7–0	Alingsås IF	Stockholm
15:00	Laukström 6'; Wulff 27'; Lillbäck 37', 79'; Blom 38'; Dahlqvist 51', 90+2'	Report		Stadium: Grimsta IP; Attendance: 32; Referee: Anastasia Oberlauf Poopuu

14 March 2026	Djurgårdens IF	4–2	IFK Norrköping	Stockholm
15:00	Watanabe 16'; Åsland 38', 54', 77'	Report	Jones 44'; Bárdardóttir 85'	Stadium: Kristinebergs IP; Attendance: 223; Referee: Amanda Nylund Karman

== Combined table ==
Pos	Team	Pld	W	D	L	GF	GA	GD	Pts	Qualification
1	BK Häcken	3	3	0	0	17	0	+17	9	Advance to the semi-finals
2	Djurgårdens IF	3	3	0	0	6	2	+4	9	Advance to the semi-finals
3	Hammarby IF	3	2	1	0	9	2	+7	7	Advance to the semi-finals
4	Kristianstads DFF	3	2	1	0	6	3	+3	7	Advance to the semi-finals
5	Piteå IF	3	2	0	1	9	5	+4	6	
6	IFK Norrköping	3	2	0	1	5	5	0	6	
7	AIK	3	2	0	1	3	4	−1	6	
8	FC Rosengård	3	1	1	1	4	5	−1	4	
9	IF Brommapojkarna	3	1	0	2	7	2	+5	3	
10	Malmö FF	3	1	0	2	7	7	0	3	
11	Linköping FC	3	1	0	2	4	4	0	3	
12	Växjö DFF	3	0	2	1	4	7	−3	2	
13	Vittsjö GIK	3	0	2	1	3	6	−3	2	
14	Umeå IK	3	0	1	2	1	8	−7	1	
15	Alingsås IF	3	0	0	3	1	10	−9	0	
16	Gefle IF	3	0	0	3	1	17	−16	0	

Source: Swedish Football Association (in Swedish)
Rules for classification: Tiebreakers

== Top scorers ==
Rank	Player	Team	Goals
1	(Norway) Therese Åsland	Djurgården	4
2	(Sweden) Monica Jusu Bah	Häcken	3
2	(Sweden) Felicia Schröder	Häcken	3
2	(Norway) Elin Sørum	Hammarby	3
5	(Iceland) Sigdís Eva Bárdardóttir	Norrköping	2
5	(Sweden) Lisa Björk	AIK	2
5	(Malawi) Faith Chinzimu	Häcken	2
5	(Sweden) Villemo Dahlqvist	Brommapojkarna	2
5	(Sweden) Alexandra Hellekant	Piteå	2
5	(Sweden) Molly Johansson	Rosengård	2
5	(Sweden) Julia Karlernäs	Norrköping	2
5	(Sweden) Julia Laukström	Brommapojkarna	2
5	(Iceland) Linda Líf Boama	Kristianstad	2
5	(Japan) Shiho Matsubara	Piteå	2
5	(Sweden) Elin Nilsson	Växjö	2
5	(Sweden) Paulina Nyström	Häcken	2
5	(Iceland) Thelma Pálmadóttir	Häcken	2
5	(Sweden) Svea Rehnberg	Hammarby	2
5	(Iceland) Elisa Lana Sigurjónsdóttir	Kristianstad	2
5	(Ghana) Sharon Sampson	Piteå	2
5	(Sweden) Tuva Skoog	Malmö	2
5	(Sweden) Saga Swedman	Växjö	2
