= 2022–23 Svenska Cupen (women) =

Football tournament season

2022–23 Svenska Cupen Damer
Tournament details
- Dates: 4 May 2022 – 6 June 2023
- Teams: 78

Final positions
- Champions: Hammarby
- Runners-up: BK Häcken

Tournament statistics
- Matches played: 55
- Goals scored: 256 (4.65 per match)
- Top goal scorer: Sara Kanutte Fornes (5 goals)
- All statistics correct as of 30 August 2022.

The 2022–23 Svenska Cupen Damer was the 40th edition of the women's association football main cup competition in Sweden. Hammarby won the cup, beating BK Häcken FF 3-0 in the final.

== Format ==
A total of 44 teams from Division 1 (third tier) and below entered the first round. The winners then joined the Elitettan (second tier) teams in the second round, while the Damallsvenskan (top tier) teams joined in the third round

The qualification round ran from May to September 2022, after which the last 16 clubs were grouped into 4 groups of 4 teams each. Round-robin group-stage games were held in February-March 2023, with the four group winners progressing to semifinals on 18-19 March and the winners of those to the final on 6 June 2023.

== Calendar ==
Below are the dates for each round as given by the official schedule:

Round	Date(s)	Number of fixtures	Clubs
Qualification round
First Round	4 May – 2 June 2022	22	44 → 22
Second Round	20 July – 17 August 2022	18	36 → 18
Third Round	30 August – 21 September 2022	16	32 → 16
Group stage
Matchday 1	25/26 February 2023	8	16 → 4
Matchday 2	4/5 March 2023	8	16 → 4
Matchday 3	11/12 March 2023	8	16 → 4
Knockout stage
Semi-finals	18/19 March 2023	2	4 → 2
Final	6 June 2023	1	2 → 1

== Qualification round ==
=== First round ===
44 teams from the Division 1 and lower entered this round via their districts qualifications. Matches are to be played between 4 May and 2 June 2022.

==== Matches ====
Sunnanå SK	3–0 (awd)	Härnösands SK
	Report

4 May 2022	FC Rosengård 1917	3–1	Trelleborgs FF	Malmö
19:15 CEST (UTC+2)	Lech 33'; Lundström 38'; Esser 48'; Cronqvist (yellow card) 90+6'	Report	Lundgren 28'	Stadium: Malmö IP; Referee: Åsa Olsson

10 May 2022	Qviding FIF	4–1	Lödöse Nygård IK	Gothenburg
19:30 CEST (UTC+2)	Söderström 15'; Holmström 35'; Jakobsson 57'; Alexandersson 60'; Rahm (yellow card) 85'	Report	Heinerås 86'	Stadium: Valhalla 1 Konstgräs; Referee: Saga Yilmaz

11 May 2022	IF Viken	1–3 (a.e.t.)	Säffle SK	Åmål
19:00 CEST (UTC+2)	Enarsson 12'	Report	Lund 82' 105'; Frankert 96'	Stadium: Rösvallen; Attendance: 85

12 May 2022	Korsnäs IF FK	0–1	Västerås BK 30	Falun
19:30 CEST (UTC+2)	Andersson (yellow card) 68'	Report	Mokko 66'	Stadium: Kopparvallen Konstgräs; Referee: Maja Jons

18 May 2022	IF Team Hudik	2–5	Sandvikens IF	Hudiksvall
19:30 CEST (UTC+2)	Forss 45' 61'; Karlsson (yellow card) 62'; Walter (yellow card) 63'	Report	Cagnina 50' 52' 60'; Hedström 64'; Blom 70'; Lang (yellow card) 90+2'	Stadium: Glysis Sparbanken Arena; Attendance: 48; Referee: Mats Eriksson

18 May 2022	Lindö FF	0–3	Örebro SK FK	Norrköping
19:30 CEST (UTC+2)		Report	Sandberg 48'; Wennerholm 61'; Dervisevic 81'	Stadium: Fastighetsteknik Arena; Referee: Jacob Mourad

18 May 2022	IK Rössö Uddevalla	4–0	Vänersborgs FK A	Uddevalla
19:30 CEST (UTC+2)	Stenberg 18'; Holmqvist (yellow card) 36'; Karnström 52'; Hansson 60'; Stenman 62'	Report		Stadium: Fridhemsvallen; Referee: Adnan Busuladzic

18 May 2022	Bollstanäs SK	4–1	Täby FK	Upplands Väsby
20:00 CEST (UTC+2)	Khalaf 22' 57'; Aglert 65'; Johnsson 90+5'	Report	Olesen 32'	Stadium: Bollstanäs IP 1 Attendance: 77; Referee: Katrin De Boer

18 May 2022	Tyresö FF	1–2	Boo FF	Tyresö
20:00 CEST (UTC+2)	Andersson 87'	Report	Alqass 14'; Bryggö (yellow card) 69' (yellow-red card) 82'; Elowsson 73'	Stadium: Tyresövallen 1 Attendance: 89; Referee: Mimmi Damtew

24 May 2022	Karlskrona FF	1–3	Färjestadens GoIF	Karlskrona
19:00 CEST (UTC+2)	Kummel 75'	Report	Svenzén 16'; Johansson 32'; Podrimcaku (yellow card) 60'; Wretman 72'	Stadium: Nättraby IP 1 Referee: Hamaad Waezi

24 May 2022	IK Tun	3–0 (awd)	Sätra SK	Nyköping
19:30 CEST (UTC+2)		Report		Stadium: Rosvalla IP KG A

25 May 2022	P18 IK	5–0	Stureby FF	Visby
19:00 CEST (UTC+2)	Hali 22'; Sato 41'; Oi 59' 69'; Bäckström 76'; Appelgren (yellow card) 83'	Report		Stadium: Visborgsvallen A plan Attendance: 83; Referee: Isak Malm

25 May 2022	Sävedalens IF	0–3	Göteborgs DFF	Sävedalen
19:30 CEST (UTC+2)		Report	Larsdotter 21' 22'; Egenwall (yellow card) 80'; Lorenzen (yellow card) 87'; Unknown 90'	Stadium: Vallhamra 1 Gräs; Attendance: 65; Referee: Stefan Cosic

29 May 2022	Ulricehamns IFK	3–0 (awd)	Råda BK	Ulricehamn
12:00 CEST (UTC+2)		Report		Stadium: Lassalyckan A-plan konstgräs

31 May 2022	Husqvarna FF	3–4 (a.e.t.)	Smedby AIS	Huskvarna
19:00 CEST (UTC+2)	Henrysson 32'; Samuelsson 75'; Norberg 116'	Report	Norén 22'; Forslund 43'; Näyhä (yellow card) 52'; Lundström 93'; Sjöberg 97'	Stadium: Vapenvallen 1 Attendance: 80; Referee: Maja Nyberg

31 May 2022	Stehags AIF	0–2	Eskilsminne IF	Stehag
19:00 CEST (UTC+2)		Report	Widesjö (yellow card) 28' (goal) 79'; Hansen 87'	Stadium: Gyavallen, Stehag A-plan; Attendance: 123; Referee: Goran Esenchev

31 May 2022	Sollentuna FK	8–1	Enskede IK	Sollentuna
20:00 CEST (UTC+2)	Somkumpee 6' 75'; Agrell 11'; Bäcklund 55' 57' 87'; Adebäck 69' 72'	Report	Svanholm 38'	Stadium: Sollentunavallen 1 Attendance: 55; Referee: Camilla Roll Hellemarck

1 June 2022	Rimbo IF	3–1	Vaksala SK	Rimbo
19:00 CEST (UTC+2)	Klar 1'; Ullström 52'; Rizzo 73'	Report	Monaco 55'	Stadium: IP Arkadien 1 Attendance: 65; Referee: Amanda Nylund Karman

1 June 2022	Mariebo IK	4–1	IFK Värnamo	Jönköping
19:00 CEST (UTC+2)	Obradovic 4'; Bergman 29'; Johansson 59'; Lindal 89'	Report	Gamby 85'	Stadium: Stadsparksvallen; Attendance: 28; Referee: Axel Håkansson

2 June 2022	Ope IF	5–1	Heffnersklubbans BK	Ope
19:00 CEST (UTC+2)	Andersson 8'; Nordenström 12' 17'; Sandström 41'; Jonasson (yellow card) 43' (goal) 76'	Report	Scharin 11'	Stadium: Torvallens IP; Attendance: 55; Referee: Michaela Backlund

2 June 2022	Hittarps IK	1–0	IS Halmia	Helsingborg
20:00 CEST (UTC+2)	Zogejani 35'; Hallström (yellow card) 53'; Jönsson (yellow card) 90'	Report	Bolmenius (yellow card) 69'	Stadium: Laröds IP A-plan; Attendance: 30; Referee: Amane Kandas

=== Second round ===
The 22 winners from the first round plus the 14 Elitettan teams play in this round.

==== Matches ====
20 July 2022	Sunnanå SK	1–3	Team TG FF	Skellefteå
19:00 CEST (UTC+2)	Hedlund 26'; Burman (yellow card) 33'	Report	Åström 15'; Fors 50'; Lindström (yellow card) 70'; Abrahamsson 82'	Stadium: Electrolux Home Arena; Attendance: 231; Referee: Tilde Larsson

28 July 2022	P18 IK	2–0	Boo FF	Visby
13:00 CEST (UTC+2)	Ronström 53' 71'	Report		Stadium: Visborgsvallen 9 mot 9 Attendance: 102; Referee: Mimmi Damtew

31 July 2022	Sandvikens IF	3–1	Västerås BK 30	Sandviken
15:00 CEST (UTC+2)	Hedström (yellow card) 39'; Folkesson 54' 88'; Lang (yellow card) 56'; Ronquist 83'	Report	Burström 29'	Stadium: Jernvallen A-planen; Attendance: 105; Referee: Amanda Nylund Karman

1 August 2022	Smedby AIS	8–0	IK Tun	Norrköping
19:30 CEST (UTC+2)	Holmberg 11' 58'; Lundström 24'; Sävhult 37'; Norén 41'; Forslund 56'; Svensson 75' 84'	Report	Andersson (yellow card) 32'	Stadium: PreZero Arena; Referee: Maria Makar

2 August 2022	Mariebo IK	1–9	IFK Norrköping	Jönköping
19:00 CEST (UTC+2)	Obradovic 77'	Report	Leidhammar 1' 16' 33'; Wiklander 31'; Cajlakovic (yellow card) 36'; Unknown 56' (o.g.); Gustafsson 69'; Handfast 71' (red card) 77'; Burvall 75'; Johansson 79'	Stadium: Stadsparksvallen; Referee: Jesper Rygert

2 August 2022	IK Rössö Uddevalla	2–2 (a.e.t.) (3–4 p)	Lidköpings FK	Uddevalla
19:30 CEST (UTC+2)	Carlsbogård 47'; Fredgren (yellow card) 77' (goal) 92'	Report	Pettersson 57' 113'	Stadium: Fridhemsvallen; Attendance: 100; Referee: Selma Griberg
	Penalties
	Christensson (penalty scored); Stenberg (penalty scored); Holmqvist (penalty scored)		Pettersson (penalty scored); Gabrielsson (penalty scored); Greulich (penalty scored); Degerstedt (penalty scored)

9 August 2022	Eskilsminne IF	1–0	Hittarps IK	Helsingborg
19:00 CEST (UTC+2)	Olsson 66'	Report		Stadium: Västergårds IP 5 Referee: Erenik Kaliqani

10 August 2022	Gamla Upsala SK	0–1	Bollstanäs SK	Uppsala
18:30 CEST (UTC+2)	Fridjonsdottir (yellow card) 28'; Wixner (yellow card) 74'	Report	Engdahl 87'; Rimeika (yellow card) 90+1'	Stadium: Gamlis IP; Attendance: 105; Referee: Katrin De Boer

16 August 2022	Ope IF	4–5	Sundsvalls DFF	Ope
19:00 CEST (UTC+2)	Bergqvist 5'; Sjölund 26'; Backman 51' 69'	Report	Olsson 10'; Unknown 14' (o.g.); Bengtsson 18' 70'; Linell 32'	Stadium: Torvallens IP; Attendance: 79; Referee: Anna-Linnéa Löfgren

16 August 2022	Rimbo IF	0–6	IK Uppsala	Rimbo
19:00 CEST (UTC+2)	Krstic (yellow card) 90'	Report	Lenir 12'; Persson 22' (yellow card) 33' (goal) 52'; Unknown 46' (o.g.); Eke 61'; Gunnarsson 70'	Stadium: IP Arkadien 1 Attendance: 110; Referee: Meysam Moosavi Ghahfarokhi

16 August 2022	Örebro SK FK	1–4	Ravasens IK Karlskoga	Örebro
19:00 CEST (UTC+2)	Ásgeirsdóttir (yellow card) 64'; Sandberg 80'	Report	Lilja 34'; Bergman 67' 86'; Öjebo 73'	Stadium: Grönpepparparkens IP A

16 August 2022	Bergdalens IK	3–2	Ulricehamns IFK	Borås
19:00 CEST (UTC+2)	Bergström 42'; Lindén 70' 78'; Gilkes (yellow card) 83'	Report	Selander 8'; Andersson 66'; Karlsson (yellow card) 88'	Stadium: Borås Arena; Attendance: 113; Referee: Elin Kängström

16 August 2022	Qviding FIF	0–11	Alingsås FC United	Gothenburg
19:30 CEST (UTC+2)		Report	Unknown 7' (o.g.); Öberg 9'; Milton 19'; De Feo 22'; Sultan 47' 53' 76'; Svanström 66' 85'; Roholt 82'; Davin 88'	Stadium: Valhalla 1 Konstgräs; Attendance: 111; Referee: Antti Kanerva

17 August 2022	Färjestadens GoIF	0–3	Växjö DFF	Färjestaden
19:00 CEST (UTC+2)	Lindeborg (yellow card) 53'; Mårtensson (yellow card) 77'	Report	Strömgren 12'; Karlsson 18'; Afram 75'	Stadium: Tallhöjdens IP; Referee: Niklas Franzén

17 August 2022	Säffle SK	0–4	Mallbackens IF	Säffle
19:00 CEST (UTC+2)		Report	Skålberg 4'; Unknown 10' (o.g.); Eriksson 55'; Kaverzina 67'	Stadium: Sporthälla IP A-plan; Attendance: 102; Referee: Vendela Högqvist

17 August 2022	FC Rosengård 1917	4–3 (a.e.t.)	Ifö Bromölla IF	Malmö
19:15 CEST (UTC+2)	Rubensson 20'; Björklund 21'; Esser 67'; Lech (yellow card) 95'; Lundström 108'	Report	Nyberg 8'; Metaj 36'; Larsson 86'	Stadium: Malmö IP; Referee: Victor Folkesson

17 August 2022	Göteborgs DFF	1–4	Jitex Mölndal BK	Gothenburg
19:30 CEST (UTC+2)	Simonsson 84'	Report	Johansson 47'; Linderoth 63' 82'; Hellekant 77'	Stadium: Valhalla 1 Konstgräs; Attendance: 60; Referee: Ina Landin

17 August 2022	Sollentuna FK	7–0	Älvsjö AIK	Sollentuna
20:00 CEST (UTC+2)	Ebbesson 10' 27'; Agrell 31'; Shand 34'; Somkumpee 68'; Viklander 80'; Bäcklund 88'	Report		Stadium: Sollentunavallen 1 Attendance: 69; Referee: Moa Wettby

=== Third round ===
The 18 winners from the second round plus the 14 Damallsvenskan teams play in this round.

==== Matches ====
30 August 2022	Sandvikens IF	0–3	IK Uppsala	Sandviken
19:00 CEST (UTC+2)	Cagnina (yellow card) 25'; Hedström (yellow card) 85'	Report	Jenkins 9'; Renmark 31'; Lenir 58'	Stadium: Jernvallen A-planen; Attendance: 83; Referee: Natnael Zerezgi

13 September 2022	Eskilsminne IF	0–8	FC Rosengård	Helsingborg
19:00 CEST (UTC+2)		Report	Holdt 6'; Sanders 11' 56'; Schmidt 28' 63'; Lundin 53' 59'; Kullashi 75'	Stadium: Harlyckans IP 1 Referee: Isabelle Svensson

13 September 2022	FC Rosengård 1917	1–5	Kristianstads DFF	Malmö
19:15 CEST (UTC+2)	Meronen 33'	Report	Pridham 45+1'; Persson 67'; Viens 75' 87'; Tindell (yellow card) 76' (goal) 90+3'	Stadium: Malmö IP; Referee: Jesper Arnshed

14 September 2022	Team TG FF	0–3	Piteå IF	Umeå
19:00 CEST (UTC+2)		Report	Johansson 34' 58'; Green (yellow card) 65'; Edlund 73'	Stadium: Umeå Energi Arena SOL; Attendance: 49; Referee: Fanny Elfving

14 September 2022	Sundsvalls DFF	0–6	Umeå IK	Sundsvall
19:00 CEST (UTC+2)		Report	Skoog 17' 40'; Kosola 49' 82'; Miettunen 72'; Honkanen 74'	Stadium: NP3 Arena; Attendance: 72; Referee: Hanna Laajanen

14 September 2022	Mallbackens IF	1–4	KIF Örebro DFF	Lysvik
19:00 CEST (UTC+2)	Bajramovic 12'	Report	Frisk 20'; Rantanen 63'; Pikkujämsä 70'; Kovacs 82'	Stadium: Strandvallen; Attendance: 242; Referee: Stefan Fredriksson

14 September 2022	Alingsås FC United	4–1	Lidköpings FK	Alingsås
19:00 CEST (UTC+2)	Jensen 29'; Milton 40' 79'; Öberg 75'	Report	Pettersson 43'	Stadium: Alströmervallen konstgräs Attendance: 75; Referee: Sandra Almkvist

14 September 2022	Jitex Mölndal BK	0–3	BK Häcken	Mölndal
19:00 CEST (UTC+2)	Palklint (yellow card) 34'	Report	Junttila-Nelhage (yellow card) 14'; Larsen 21'; Zeller 25'; Gejl 42'	Stadium: Åbyvallen; Attendance: 232; Referee: Ina Landin

14 September 2022	Ravasens IK Karlskoga	0–7	Eskilstuna United DFF	Karlskoga
19:00 CEST (UTC+2)		Report	Ökvist 29'; Bækkelund 36' 48'; Vickius 51'; Eckhoff 61'; Plan 66'; Rogic 90'	Stadium: Kilsta IP 2 Attendance: 62; Referee: Vendela Högqvist

14 September 2022	Smedby AIS	1–3	Linköpings FC	Norrköping
19:30 CEST (UTC+2)	Jansson 59'	Report	Vangsgaard 20' 35' 74'	Stadium: PreZero Arena; Attendance: 373; Referee: Josef Eissa

14 September 2022	Bollstanäs SK	0–3	IF Brommapojkarna	Upplands Väsby
20:00 CEST (UTC+2)	Malki (yellow card) 65'	Report	Famili 2'; Swedman 12'; Wallén 67'	Stadium: Bollstanäs IP; Attendance: 114; Referee: Moa Wettby

14 September 2022	Sollentuna FK	1–2	AIK	Sollentuna
20:00 CEST (UTC+2)	Zandén 55'; Shand (yellow card) 67' (yellow-red card) 83'; Gillberg (yellow card) 90+3'	Report	Rönnfors 3'; Wennberg (yellow card) 65'; Unknown 90+2' (o.g.)	Stadium: Sollentunavallen 1 Attendance: 69; Referee: Mimmi Damtew

15 September 2022	Bergdalens IK	0–9	Vittsjö GIK	Borås
19:00 CEST (UTC+2)	Dixon (yellow card) 2'	Report	Ekengren 10'; Stratigakis 22'; N Karlsson 40' 90+3'; M Karlsson 49'; Rantala 54' 60'; Markstedt 68' 68'	Stadium: Borås Arena; Attendance: 34; Referee: Abdinaser Bashir

21 September 2022	IFK Kalmar	0–3	Växjö DFF	Kalmar
18:30 CEST (UTC+2)	Fischerová (yellow card) 41'	Report	Stokki 47' 58'; Mattsson (yellow card) 50'; Unknown 66' (o.g.)	Stadium: Gröndals IP; Attendance: 254; Referee: Rustam Osmanov

21 September 2022	P18 IK	0–2	Djurgårdens IF	Visby
19:00 CEST (UTC+2)		Report	Bergström 30'; Johansson 69'	Stadium: Gutavallen; Attendance: 938; Referee: Ola Bröms

21 September 2022	IFK Norrköping	0–1	Hammarby	Norrköping
19:00 CEST (UTC+2)	Flenhagen (yellow card) 29'; Bugre (yellow card) 37'	Report	Jansson 65'; Cooney-Cross (yellow card) 87'; Nevin (yellow card) 90+3'	Stadium: PlatinumCars Arena; Attendance: 580; Referee: Moa Wettby

=== Group 1 ===
Pos	Team	Pld	W	D	L	GF	GA	GD	Pts	Qualification	KRI	LIN	ROS	ALI
1	Kristianstads DFF	3	3	0	0	9	3	+6	9	Advance to Knockout Stage				6–2
2	Linköpings FC	3	1	1	1	9	3	+6	4		1–2			
3	FC Rosengård	3	1	1	1	5	2	+3	4		0–1	1–1		
4	Alingsås FC United	3	0	0	3	2	17	−15	0			0–7	0–4	

Source: https://www.svenskfotboll.se/serier-cuper/tabell-och-resultat/100078/
Rules for classification: 1) Points; 2) Goal difference; 3) Goals scored; 4) Head-to-head record; 5) Highest ranked team

26 February 2023 Matchday 1	Alingsås FC United	0–7	Linköpings FC	Alingsås
15:00		Report	Momiki 17'; Takarada 24'; Tandberg 38', 87', 90'; Lennartsson 44', 73'	Stadium: Gerdskenvallen; Attendance: 148; Referee: Selma Griberg

26 February 2023 Matchday 1	FC Rosengård	0–1	Kristianstads DFF	Malmö
15:00		Report	Alanen 24'	Stadium: Malmö IP; Attendance: 357; Referee: Max Persson

4 March 2023 Matchday 2	Alingsås FC United	0–4	FC Rosengård	Alingsås
15:00		Report	Schough 32', 43', 88'; Larsson 81'	Stadium: Gerdskenvallen; Attendance: 130; Referee: Selma Griberg

4 March 2023 Matchday 2	Linköpings FC	1–2	Kristianstads DFF	Linköping
16:00	Tandberg 16'	Report	Eiríksdóttir 70'; Viens 86'	Stadium: Bilbörsen Arena; Attendance: 182; Referee: Lovisa Johansson

11 March 2023 Matchday 3	Kristianstads DFF	6–2	Alingsås FC United	Kristianstad
13:00	Brewster 16'; Petrović 27'; Eiríksdóttir 62'; Viens 73'; Harrysson 87'; Tindell 90+1'	Report	Öberg 36'; 67' (o.g.)	Stadium: Kristianstads Arenaområde; Attendance: 176; Referee: Niklas Olsson

11 March 2023 Matchday 3	FC Rosengård	1–1	Linköpings FC	Malmö
13:00	Schough 90+6'	Report	Kapocs 77'	Stadium: Malmö IP; Attendance: 309; Referee: Maral Mirzai

=== Group 2 ===
Pos	Team	Pld	W	D	L	GF	GA	GD	Pts	Qualification	HÄK	VIT	ÖRE	VÄX
1	BK Häcken FF	3	3	0	0	10	2	+8	9	Advance to Knockout Stage		3–1	3–1	
2	Vittsjö GIK	3	1	1	1	3	4	−1	4				1–0	
3	KIF Örebro DFF	3	1	0	2	5	5	0	3					4–1
4	Växjö DFF	3	0	1	2	2	9	−7	1		0–4	1–1		

Source: https://www.svenskfotboll.se/serier-cuper/tabell-och-resultat/100079/
Rules for classification: 1) Points; 2) Goal difference; 3) Goals scored; 4) Head-to-head record; 5) Highest ranked team

25 February 2023 Matchday 1	BK Häcken FF	3–1	KIF Örebro DFF	Gothenburg
15:00	Rybrink 15'; Kafaji 50'; Larsen 61'	Report	Bodin 90'	Stadium: Bravida Arena; Attendance: 207; Referee: Isabelle Svensson

26 February 2023 Matchday 1	Växjö DFF	1–1	Vittsjö GIK	Växjö
15:00	Jonasson 83'	Report	Rantala 13'	Stadium: Sportfältet Teleborg; Referee: Lovisa Johansson

5 March 2023 Matchday 2	Vittsjö GIK	1–0	KIF Örebro DFF	Strömsnäsbruk
15:00	Sällström 58'	Report		Stadium: Strömsborg IP; Referee: Maral Mirzai

5 March 2023 Matchday 2	Växjö DFF	0–4	BK Häcken FF	Växjö
15:00		Report	Kafaji 23', 51'; Junttila-Nelhage 39'; Hellekant 83'	Stadium: Sportfältet Teleborg; Attendance: 174; Referee: Isabelle Svensson

12 March 2023 Matchday 3	KIF Örebro DFF	4–1	Växjö DFF	Örebro
15:00	Harding 25'; Bodin 47', 57'; Kollanen 74'	Report	Kemppi 89'	Stadium: Behrn Arena; Attendance: 300; Referee: Abdinaser Bashir

12 March 2023 Matchday 3	BK Häcken FF	3–1	Vittsjö GIK	Gothenburg
15:00	Larsen 3'; Anvegård 45'; Kafaji 49'	Report	Sällström 47'	Stadium: Bravida Arena; Attendance: 249; Referee: Sandra Almkvist

=== Group 3 ===
Pos	Team	Pld	W	D	L	GF	GA	GD	Pts	Qualification	HAM	BRO	UPP	ESK
1	Hammarby	3	3	0	0	13	0	+13	9	Advance to Knockout Stage		4–0		5–0
2	IF Brommapojkarna	3	2	0	1	6	4	+2	6				1–0	
3	IK Uppsala	3	1	0	2	4	6	−2	3		0–4			4–1
4	Eskilstuna United DFF	3	0	0	3	1	14	−13	0			0–5		

Source: https://www.svenskfotboll.se/serier-cuper/tabell-och-resultat/100080/
Rules for classification: 1) Points; 2) Goal difference; 3) Goals scored; 4) Head-to-head record; 5) Highest ranked team

26 February 2023 Matchday 1	Hammarby	4–0	IF Brommapojkarna	Stockholm
15:00	Hamano 6'; Vinberg 26', 55', 90+3'	Report		Stadium: Hammarby IP; Attendance: 552; Referee: Sara Wiinikka

26 February 2023 Matchday 1	IK Uppsala	4–1	Eskilstuna United DFF	Uppsala
15:00	Öhman 7'; Ries 22', 32'; Renmark 56'	Report	Miclat 36'	Stadium: Studenternas IP; Attendance: 125; Referee: Camilla Friberg

4 March 2023 Matchday 2	Eskilstuna United DFF	0–5	IF Brommapojkarna	Eskilstuna
14:00		Report	Andrup 34'; Boriero 68', 73'; Ahlberg 81'; Thörnqvist 87'	Stadium: Tunavallen; Referee: Cecilia Ekwall

4 March 2023 Matchday 2	IK Uppsala	0–4	Hammarby	Uppsala
18:00		Report	Fornes 32', 90+1'; Hasund 59'; Hamano 67'	Stadium: Studenternas IP; Attendance: 248; Referee: Sandra Almkvist

11 March 2023 Matchday 3	IF Brommapojkarna	1–0	IK Uppsala	Vällingby
15:00	Boriero 36'	Report		Stadium: Grimsta IP; Attendance: 56; Referee: Koray Köylüoglu

11 March 2023 Matchday 3	Hammarby	5–0	Eskilstuna United DFF	Stockholm
15:00	Nyström 17'; Fornes 22', 50'; Gibson 68'; Hamano 89'	Report		Stadium: Hammarby IP; Attendance: 453; Referee: Eva Svärdsudd

=== Group 4 ===
Pos	Team	Pld	W	D	L	GF	GA	GD	Pts	Qualification	PIT	DIF	AIK	UME
1	Piteå IF	3	2	1	0	7	3	+4	7	Advance to Knockout Stage		2–2		4–1
2	Djurgårdens IF	3	1	1	1	10	4	+6	4					7–0
3	AIK	3	1	1	1	3	3	0	4		0–1	2–1		
4	Umeå IK	3	0	1	2	2	12	−10	1				1–1	

Source: https://www.svenskfotboll.se/serier-cuper/tabell-och-resultat/100081/
Rules for classification: 1) Points; 2) Goal difference; 3) Goals scored; 4) Head-to-head record; 5) Highest ranked team

25 February 2023 Matchday 1	AIK	2–1	Djurgårdens IF	Stockholm
15:00	Hagström 73'; Flores 87'	Report	Plan 35'	Stadium: Skytteholms IP; Referee: Eva Svärdsudd

26 February 2023 Matchday 1	Piteå IF	4–1	Umeå IK	Piteå
14:00	Viklund 35'; Skoog 56', 62'; Edlund 78'	Report	Sandström 69'	Stadium: Nolia-Airdome; Attendance: 100; Referee: Cecilia Ekwall

5 March 2023 Matchday 2	Djurgårdens IF	7–0	Umeå IK	Stockholm
13:00	Johansson 2', 39'; Lindwall 5', 20', 52', 59'; Plan 48'	Report		Stadium: Stadshagens IP; Attendance: 170; Referee: Camilla Friberg

5 March 2023 Matchday 2	AIK	0–1	Piteå IF	Stockholm
17:00		Report	Carlsson 16'	Stadium: Skytteholms IP; Referee: Hanna Laajanen

12 March 2023 Matchday 3	Umeå IK	1–1	AIK	Umeå
13:00	Schampi 56'	Report	Nildén 66'	Stadium: Umeå Energi Arena; Attendance: 151; Referee: Hanna Laajanen

12 March 2023 Matchday 3	Piteå IF	2–2	Djurgårdens IF	Piteå
13:00	Green 41'; Skoog 50'	Report	Hed 54'; Lundin 67'	Stadium: LF Arena; Attendance: 100; Referee: Andreas Forsberg

== Knockout stage ==
Semi-finals
18 March 2023
BK Häcken	2
Kristianstads DFF	1
19 March 2023
Hammarby	4
Piteå IF	1

Final
6 June 2023
BK Häcken	0
Hammarby	3

=== Semi-finals ===
18 March 2023	BK Häcken	2–1	Kristianstads DFF	Gothenburg
14:00 CEST (UTC+2)	Anvegård 54'; Larsen 90+1'	Report	Alanen 26'	Stadium: Bravida Arena; Attendance: 338; Referee: Maral Mirzai

19 March 2023	Hammarby	4–1 (a.e.t.)	Piteå IF	Stockholm
13:00 CEST (UTC+2)	Fornes 15'; Boye Sørensen 95'; Vinberg 105'; Janogy 115'	Report	Imo 58'	Stadium: Hammarby IP; Attendance: 904; Referee: Eva Svärdsudd

=== Final ===
6 June 2023	BK Häcken	0–3	Hammarby	Stockholm
15:00 CEST (UTC+2)		Report	Janogy 47', 58'; Hamano 68'	Stadium: Tele2 Arena; Attendance: 17,623; Referee: Maral Mirzai

== Statistics ==
=== Top scorers ===
As of 6 June 2023

Rank	Player	Club	Goals
1	(Norway) Sara Kanutte Fornes	Hammarby	5
2	(Japan) Maika Hamano	Hammarby	4
2	(Sweden) Rosa Kafaji	Häcken	4
2	(Sweden) Tilde Lindwall	Djurgården	4
2	(Sweden) Olivia Schough	Rosengård	4
2	(Norway) Cathinka Tandberg	Linköping	4
2	(Sweden) Matilda Vinberg	Hammarby	4
8	(Sweden) Maja Bodin	Örebro	3
8	(Sweden) Frida Boriero	Brommapojkarna	3
8	(Sweden) Madelen Janogy	Hammarby	3
8	(Denmark) Stine Larsen	Häcken	3
8	(Sweden) Tuva Skoog	Piteå	3
