= Alice Carlsson =

Swedish association footballer (born 1995)

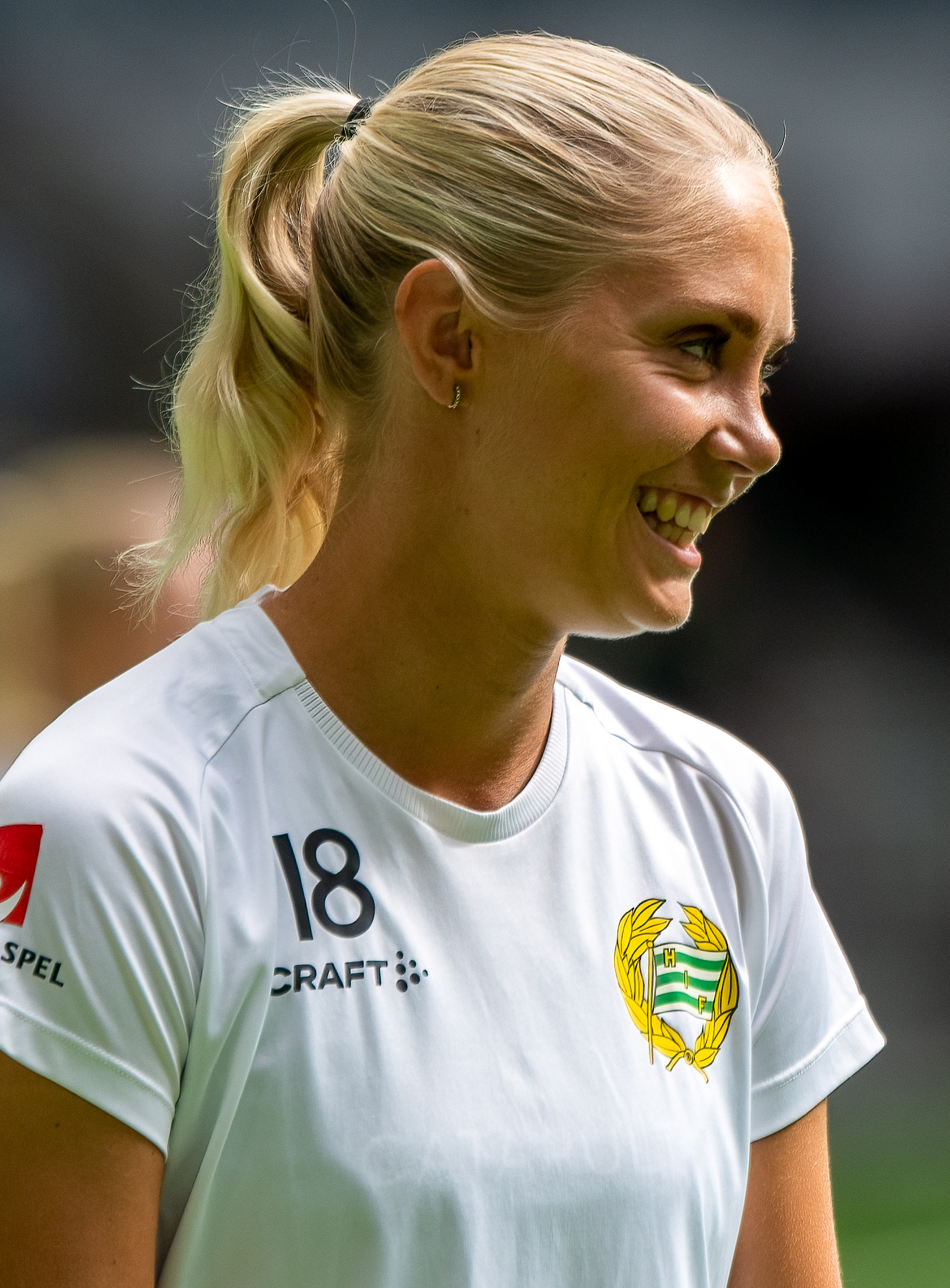
- Carlsson with Hammarby in 2022

Personal information
- Full name: Alice Kristina Carlsson
- Date of birth: 15 September 1995 (age 31)
- Place of birth: Hyssna, Sweden

Team information
- Current team: Hammarby IF
- Number: 18

Youth career
- Hyssna IF
- IFK Örby

Senior career*
Years	Team	Apps	(Gls)
2011–2012	IFK Örby	32	(2)
2013	Qviding FIF	10	(0)
2013–2016	IFK Örby	65	(1)
2017–2018	Jitex BK	43	(2)
2019	IF Brommapojkarna	26	(1)
2020–	Hammarby IF	160	(7)
- * Club domestic league appearances and goals as of 22 November 2026

Alice Kristina Carlsson (born 15 September 1995) is a Swedish professional footballer who plays as a defender for Hammarby IF in the Damallsvenskan.

== Early life and youth career ==
Alice Carlsson was born in Hyssna, Sweden. She began her youth football career with her local club, Hyssna IF, before moving to IFK Örby, where she continued her development as a promising young player.

== Club career ==
Carlsson has played for several clubs in Sweden. She started her senior career at IFK Örby in 2011. Over the years, she played for clubs including Qviding FIF, Jitex BK, and IF Brommapojkarna, demonstrating her skills as a reliable defender.

In 2020, Carlsson joined Hammarby Fotboll, where she become an integral part of the squad and chosen to become the club captain. Alice lead her Hammarby side to get promoted up to the highest tier of the Swedish league pyramid, Damallsvenskan in her first year. In 2023 she won The Swedish Double (Damallsvenskan and the Swedish Cup). In 2024 Alice Carlsson rejected a generous offer from the Italian team Inter Milan to continue to play for Hammarby.

== Honours ==
=== Club ===
Hammarby IF

- Svenska Cupen: 2022–23
- Damallsvenskan: 2023
