= 2025–26 Svenska Cupen (women) =

Tournament details
- Country: Sweden
- Dates: 2025 – 2026
- Teams: 72

Final positions
- Champions: Hammarby (5th title)
- Runners-up: Häcken

Tournament statistics
- Matches played: 40
- Goals scored: 167 (4.18 per match)
- Goals scored in penalty shootouts not included.

The 2025–26 Svenska Cupen Damer is the 44th and current season of the Svenska Cupen Damer, the Swedish national women's football cup competition.

Hammarby IF are the defending champions, having won their fourth title in the 2024–25 season. They successfully defended their title, defeating double winners BK Häcken 1–0 after extra time in the final, with the loan goal being scored by Norwegian striker Mari Nyhagen.

== Group stage ==
=== Group 1 ===
Pos	Team	Pld	W	D	L	GF	GA	GD	Pts	Qualification	HÄK	AIK	LIN	GEF
1	BK Häcken	3	3	0	0	17	0	+17	9	Advance to the semi-finals		3–0	3–0	
2	AIK	3	2	0	1	3	4	−1	6				1–0	
3	Linköping FC	3	1	0	2	4	4	0	3					4–0
4	Gefle IF	3	0	0	3	1	17	−16	0		0–11	1–2		

Source: Swedish Football Association
Rules for classification: Tiebreakers

=== Group 2 ===
Pos	Team	Pld	W	D	L	GF	GA	GD	Pts	Qualification	HAM	ROS	VÄX	VIT
1	Hammarby IF	3	2	1	0	9	2	+7	7	Advance to the semi-finals			2–2	3–0
2	FC Rosengård	3	1	1	1	4	5	−1	4		0–3			
3	Växjö DFF	3	0	2	1	4	7	−3	2			0–3		
4	Vittsjö GIK	3	0	2	1	3	6	−3	2			1–1	2–2	

Source: Swedish Football Association
Rules for classification: Tiebreakers

=== Group 3 ===
Pos	Team	Pld	W	D	L	GF	GA	GD	Pts	Qualification	KRI	PIT	MAL	UME
1	Kristianstads DFF	3	2	1	0	6	3	+3	7	Advance to the semi-finals		3–2		
2	Piteå IF	3	2	0	1	9	5	+4	6					4–0
3	Malmö FF	3	1	0	2	7	7	0	3		1–3	2–3		
4	Umeå IK	3	0	1	2	1	8	−7	1		0–0		1–4	

Source: Swedish Football Association
Rules for classification: Tiebreakers

=== Group 4 ===
Pos	Team	Pld	W	D	L	GF	GA	GD	Pts	Qualification	DJU	NOR	BRO	ALI
1	Djurgårdens IF	3	3	0	0	6	2	+4	9	Advance to the semi-finals		4–2	1–0	
2	IFK Norrköping	3	2	0	1	5	5	0	6				1–0	2–1
3	IF Brommapojkarna	3	1	0	2	7	2	+5	3					7–0
4	Alingsås IF	3	0	0	3	1	10	−9	0		0–1			

Source: Swedish Football Association
Rules for classification: Tiebreakers

== Final rounds ==
=== Bracket ===
Semi-finals
20 March 2026
Kristianstad	0
Hammarby	2
20 March 2026
Djurgården	1
Häcken	3

Final
Hammarby	1
Häcken	0

=== Semi-finals ===
20 March 2026	Kristianstads DFF	0–2	Hammarby IF	Kristianstad
19:00 UTC+1		Report	Sørum 48', 81'	Stadium: Kristianstads Fotbollsarena; Attendance: 403; Referee: Lovisa Johansson

20 March 2026	Djurgårdens IF	1–3 (a.e.t.)	BK Häcken	Stockholm
18:00 UTC+1	Ólafsdottir Grós 10'	Report	Schröder 81', 97', 120'	Stadium: Kristinebergs IP; Attendance: 497; Referee: Eva Svärdsudd

=== Final ===
16 May 2026
15:00 UTC+2

Hammarby IF	1–0 (a.e.t.)	BK Häcken
Nyhagen 107'	Report

3Arena, Stockholm
Attendance: 3,793
Referee: Hanna Laajanen
