= Yuna Matsubara =

Japanese footballer

Personal information
- Date of birth: 24 January 2000 (age 26)
- Place of birth: Osaka Prefecture, Japan
- Height: 1.65 m (5 ft 5 in)
- Position: Defender

Team information
- Current team: 1. FFC Turbine Potsdam
- Number: 6

Senior career*
Years	Team	Apps	(Gls)
2016–2020	Cerezo Osaka	?	(?)
2021–2023	Sanfrecce Hiroshima Regina	17	(2)
2023–2026	INAC Kobe Leonessa	1	(0)
2026–	Turbine Potsdam	6	(0)
- * Club domestic league appearances and goals

Yuna Matsubara (松原優菜, Matsubara Yuna; pronounced [matsɯbaɾa jɯna]; born 24 January 2000) is a Japanese professional footballer who plays as a defender for 2. Frauen-Bundesliga club 1. FFC Turbine Potsdam.

Matsubara is the younger sister of Shiho Matsubara, who is also a professional footballer (currently playing for Damallsvenskan club Piteå IF).

== Club career ==
Matsubara made her WE League debut on 12 September 2021.
