= Ebba Wieder =

Swedish footballer

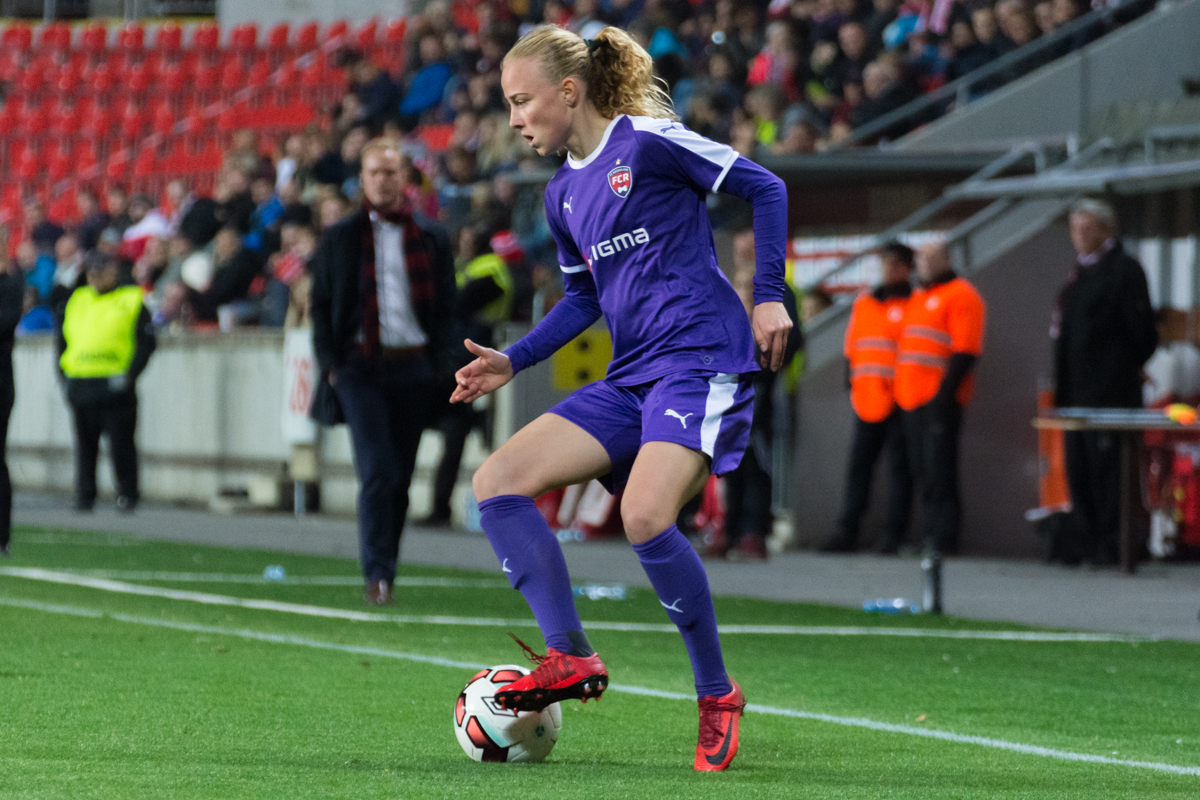
- At the UWCL match vs Slavia Prague

Personal information
- Full name: Ebba Mona Christina Wieder
- Date of birth: 13 July 1998 (age 28)å
- Place of birth: Malmö, Sweden
- Height: 1.70 m (5 ft 7 in)
- Position: Midfielder

Team information
- Current team: Växjö DFF

Senior career*
Years	Team	Apps	(Gls)
2013–2019	FC Rosengård	87	(6)
2020–2021	Vittsjö GIK	25	(2)
2022–2023	Djurgården	13	(0)
2023	Bollstanäs SK	9	(0)
2024-2024	Molde FK	13	(2)
2025-	Växjö DFF	0	(0)

International career^{‡}
2014–2015	Sweden U17	12	(3)
2015–2017	Sweden U19	15	(0)
2018	Sweden U23	13	(0)
- * Club domestic league appearances and goals as of 12:00, 18 Jul 2019 (UTC) ‡ National team caps and goals as of 12:00, 18 Jul 2019 (UTC)

Ebba Wieder (born 13 July 1998) is a Swedish footballer who plays as a midfielder for Växjö DFF.

Vittsjö GIK announced on 14 April 2021 that she is taking an indefinite break from football to focus on her mental health.

== Honours ==
Rosengård

- Damallsvenskan: 2013, 2014, 2015
- Svenska Supercupen: 2015/2016, 2016/2017, 2017/2018
