= Helmi Raijas =

Finnish footballer (born 2005)

Personal information
- Date of birth: 11 May 2005 (age 21)
- Place of birth: Finland
- Position: Defender

Youth career
- –2015: Viikingit
- 2016–2022: Puotinkylän Valtti
- 2022: HFA-Märsky

Senior career*
Years	Team	Apps	(Gls)
2023–2024	HJK	43	(2)
2025–	Växjö	0	(0)

International career^{‡}
2022	Finland U17	4	(0)
2023	Finland U18	2	(0)
2022–2024	Finland U19	19	(0)
2024–	Finland U23	2	(0)
- * Club domestic league appearances and goals as of 30 December 2024 ‡ National team caps and goals as of 30 December 2024

Helmi Raijas (born 11 May 2005) is a Finnish professional footballer who plays as a defender for Damallsvenskan club Växjö DFF.

== Honours ==
HJK

- Kansallinen Liiga: 2024
- Finnish Women's Cup: 2024
