= Melina Loeck =

German footballer (born 2000)

Personal information
- Date of birth: 1 July 2000 (age 26)
- Place of birth: Germany
- Height: 1.80 m (5 ft 11 in)
- Position: Goalkeeper

Team information
- Current team: Brighton & Hove Albion
- Number: 28

Youth career
- 2016-2020: VfL Wolfsburg

Senior career*
| Years | Team | Apps | (Gls) |
| 2020-2023 | Kristianstads DFF | 53 | (0) |
| 2023- | Brighton & Hove Albion | 10 | (0) |
| 2025-2026 | → Hammarby (loan) | 21 | (0) |
- * Club domestic league appearances and goals as of 25 June 2026

Melina Loeck (German: [meˈliːna lœk]) is a German professional footballer who plays as a goalkeeper for Women's Super League club Brighton & Hove Albion.

== Career ==
Loeck joined the VfL Wolfsburg youth team in 2016.

On 31 December 2020, she signed for Kristianstads DFF.

On 22 January 2024, Brighton & Hove Albion announced the signing of Loeck from Kristianstads DFF, and made her Women's Super League debut on 28 April 2024 in a 1–1 draw against Tottenham Hotspur.

On 1 August 2025, Loeck signed a new contract with Brighton & Hove Albion and then joined Hammarby until 1 January 2026.Loeck had her loan spell with Hammarby extended until 30 June 2026.

== Career statistics ==
As of match played 18 November 2026

| Club | Season | League | | | National Cup (Note: Includes Svenska Cupen Women and Women's FA Cup) | | League Cup (Note: Includes FA Women's League Cup) | | Continental (Note: Includes UEFA Women's Champions League and UEFA Women's Europa Cup) | | Total | |
| Club | Season | Division | Apps | Goals | Apps | Goals | Apps | Goals | Apps | Goals | Apps | Goals |
|---|---|---|---|---|---|---|---|---|---|---|---|---|
| Kristianstads DFF | 2020 | Damallsvenskan | 1 | 0 | 1 | 0 | — | | 0 | 0 | 2 | 0 |
| Kristianstads DFF | 2021 | Damallsvenskan | 12 | 0 | 3 | 0 | — | | 0 | 0 | 15 | 0 |
| Kristianstads DFF | 2022 | Damallsvenskan | 26 | 0 | 3 | 0 | — | | 2 | 0 | 31 | 0 |
| Kristianstads DFF | 2023 | Damallsvenskan | 14 | 0 | 1 | 0 | — | | 0 | 0 | 15 | 0 |
| Kristianstads DFF | Total | | 53 | 0 | 8 | 0 | — | | 2 | 0 | 63 | 0 |
| Brighton & Hove Albion | 2023–24 | Women's Super League | 2 | 0 | 0 | 0 | 0 | 0 | — | | 2 | 0 |
| Brighton & Hove Albion | 2024–25 | Women's Super League | 8 | 0 | 2 | 0 | 4 | 0 | — | | 14 | 0 |
| Brighton & Hove Albion | 2026–27 | Women's Super League | 0 | 0 | 0 | 0 | 4 | 0 | — | | 4 | 0 |
| Brighton & Hove Albion | Total | | 10 | 0 | 2 | 0 | 8 | 0 | — | | 20 | 0 |
| Hammarby (loan) | 2025 | Damallsvenskan | 11 | 0 | 0 | 0 | — | | 6 | 0 | 17 | 0 |
| Hammarby (loan) | 2026 | Damallsvenskan | 10 | 0 | 5 | 0 | — | | 6 | 0 | 21 | 0 |
| Hammarby (loan) | Total | | 21 | 0 | 5 | 0 | — | | 12 | 0 | 38 | 0 |
| Career total | | | 84 | 0 | 15 | 0 | 8 | 0 | 14 | 0 | 121 | 0 |
