= Maja Bodin =

Swedish footballer (born 2001)

Personal information
- Full name: Maja Linnea Sofhia Bodin
- Date of birth: 15 September 2001 (age 25)
- Place of birth: Karlskrona, Sweden
- Position: Striker

Team information
- Current team: BK Häcken
- Number: 9

Youth career
- 2009–2013: Karlskrona
- 2013–2015: Nättraby GoIF

Senior career*
Years	Team	Apps	(Gls)
2015–2017	Nättraby GoIF	26	(14)
2017–2022	Kristianstad	59	(3)
2019	→ Asarum (loan)	2	(0)
2021	→ Nättraby GoIF (loan)	5	(2)
2023–2024	KIF Örebro	38	(11)
2025–2026	Växjö	38	(13)
2026–	BK Häcken	13	(11)

International career^{‡}
2019–2020	Sweden U-19	6	(0)
2023–2026	Sweden U-23	9	(1)
- * Club domestic league appearances and goals as of 15 November 2026 ‡ National team caps and goals as of 12 October 2026

Maja Linnea Sofhia Bodin (born 15 September 2001) is a Swedish professional footballer who plays as a striker for Damallsvenskan club BK Häcken. Debuting for Kristianstad at age 15 in 2017, she made her breakthrough with KIF Örebro in 2023, before moving to Växjö two years later. She joined BK Häcken midseason in 2026, winning the Damallsvenskan championship as top scorer in the league.

== Club career ==
=== Kristianstad ===
Born in Karlskrona, Bodin began playing football with boys at local club Karlskrona at age eight. She joined the girls' academy of Nättraby GoIF a few years later. Soon afterwards, she was integrated into their Division 2 (fourth tier) first-team squad at age 13.

Bodin began training weekly with Damallsvenskan side Kristianstad at age 15, signing with the club in late August 2017. A week later, on 3 September, the young forward debuted in the top flight in a 2–1 defeat to Piteå, coming on as a substitute for Tine Schryvers in the 65th minute.

On 19 May 2019, at age 17, Bodin scored her first Damallsvenskan goal to conclude Kristianstad's 3–0 victory over Eskilstuna United. She then played two matches for Elitettan club Asarum, having been loaned to the club on a part-time basis. On 20 July, returning to Kristianstad after the World Cup break, she made her first start in the Damallsvenskan and opened the scoring in a 5–0 win against Kungsbacka.

After six seasons, Bodin left Kristianstad as a free agent at the end of 2022. She scored three league goals for the club. She later reflected: "My years in Kristianstad have shaped me a great deal, both as a person and as a player. I might not have played a huge amount, but I learned to have patience and to work hard."

=== KIF Örebro ===
On 16 December 2022, Bodin signed a two-year contract with KIF Örebro. She debuted for the club in the Swedish Cup on 25 February 2023, scoring the final goal in a 3–1 loss to BK Häcken. Two weeks later, she scored twice in a 4–1 win over Växjö in the same competition. On 2 April, she registered a goal and an assist in a 2–0 league win over Djurgården – her first Damallsvenskan goal in nearly three years. She finished her breakthrough season with 10 goals in all competitions as KIF Örebro's top scorer.

Bodin signed a one-year extension before the following season. On 24 March 2024, she sprained her right foot while scoring in a 5–2 defeat to Hammarby in the Swedish Cup. She missed three months with the injury. On 6 July, in her second match back, she came off the bench to score the 1–0 winner against Djurgården. Despite missing half the season, she was again KIF Örebro's top scorer with 5 goals in all competitions, but could not prevent their relegation from the top flight. Her contract was ended one year early due to the relegation.

=== Växjö ===
On 20 December 2024, following KIF Örebro's relegation, Bodin signed a two-year contract with Växjö. She debuted for the club in the Swedish Cup on 3 March 2025, opening the scoring in a 4–3 defeat to Malmö. Later that month, she scored her first league goal for the club in a season-opening 4–1 loss to Hammarby. On 12 April, she made her 100th career Damallsvenskan appearance and scored the last goal in a 3–0 victory over Alingsås, Växjö's first win of the year. She finished her debut season with 9 goals in all competitions, second in the squad behind Larkin Russell.

On 29 March 2026, Bodin scored the first goal of the Damallsvenskan season, but Växjö lost 2–1 to Djurgården. With five goals through six matches, the forward's strong start to the season drew interest from clubs including Arsenal and West Ham United. She left Växjö soon after the summer break; without her, the club was relegated at the end of the season.

=== BK Häcken ===
On 11 August 2026, Bodin was sold to league rivals BK Häcken, the Damallsvenskan's reigning champions. She signed a five-year contract through 2030. She was viewed as Häcken's replacement for Felicia Schröder, taking over the number 9 shirt from the record transfer player sold to Real Madrid. She debuted for the club four days later, scoring her first career hat trick in a 6–0 win over Brommapojkarna. She scored twice the following week in a 4–1 win over AIK, becoming a double-digit league scorer for the first time. Her standout performances saw her named Player of the Month for August. On 22 September, she made her Champions League debut in a 1–0 defeat to Inter Milan. On 2 November, she scored twice in a 4–1 win over former club Kristianstad as Häcken secured their second consecutive league title. On the final matchday, two weeks later, she scored her 16th league goal of the season in a 2–0 win over Piteå, securing the outright league scoring title over teammate Tabby Tindell.

== International career ==
Bodin made her international debut for the Sweden under-19 team on 28 August 2019, coming on as a substitute for Evelyn Ijeh in a 3–1 win over Iceland. She was part of the qualifying squad for the 2020 UEFA Women's Under-19 Championship which was cancelled due to the COVID-19 pandemic. On 30 November 2023, she debuted for the under-23 team in a 4–1 friendly loss to Spain. A few days later, she scored her first international goal for the under-23s in a 4–2 defeat to the Netherlands.

== Personal life ==
Bodin is the daughter of Ulrika and Anders Bodin. She has a younger brother, Moltas, who plays for her former club Karlskrona. She appeared on the children's TV shows Barda and Wild Kids at age 12; she was part of the Lejonen ("lions") team that won the latter in 2014.

== Honors ==
BK Häcken

- Damallsvenskan: 2026

Individual

- Damallsvenskan top scorer: 2026
