= Stina Lennartsson =

Swedish footballer (born 1997)

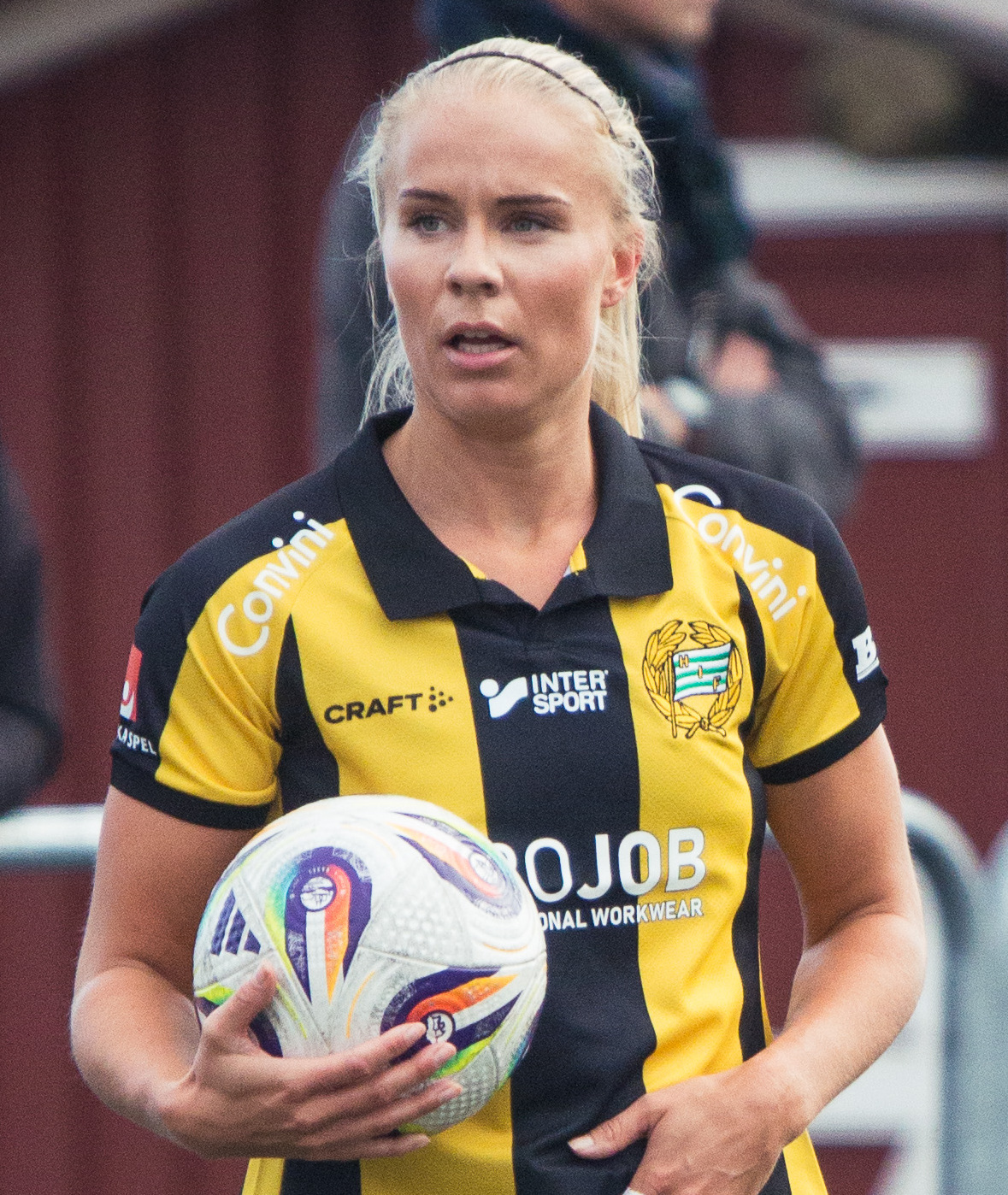
- Lennartsson with Hammarby IF in 2025

Personal information
- Full name: Stina Olivia Lennartsson
- Date of birth: 4 April 1997 (age 29)
- Place of birth: Sweden
- Position: Defender

Team information
- Current team: Hammarby IF
- Number: 17

Senior career*
Years	Team	Apps	(Gls)
2013–2014	Landsbro IK	21	(2)
2014–2021	Växjö DFF	73	(4)
2021–2023	Linköping FC	43	(5)
2024–	Hammarby IF	64	(2)

International career^{‡}
2012	Sweden U17	2	(0)
2023–	Sweden U23	5	(0)
2023–	Sweden	2	(0)
- * Club domestic league appearances and goals as of 22 November 2026 ‡ National team caps and goals as of 25 February 2024

Stina Olivia Lennartsson (born 4 April 1997) is a Swedish professional footballer who plays as a defender for Damallsvenskan club Hammarby IF and the Sweden national team.

== International career ==
On 18 July 2023, Lennartsson was recalled to the 23-player squad for the 2023 FIFA Women's World Cup as the replacement for the injured Hanna Lundkvist.

== Career statistics ==
=== International ===
As of match played 2 August 2023

Appearances and goals by national team and year
National team	Year	Apps	Goals
Sweden	2023	2	0
Total		2	0
