= Bella Andersson =

Swedish footballer (born 2006)

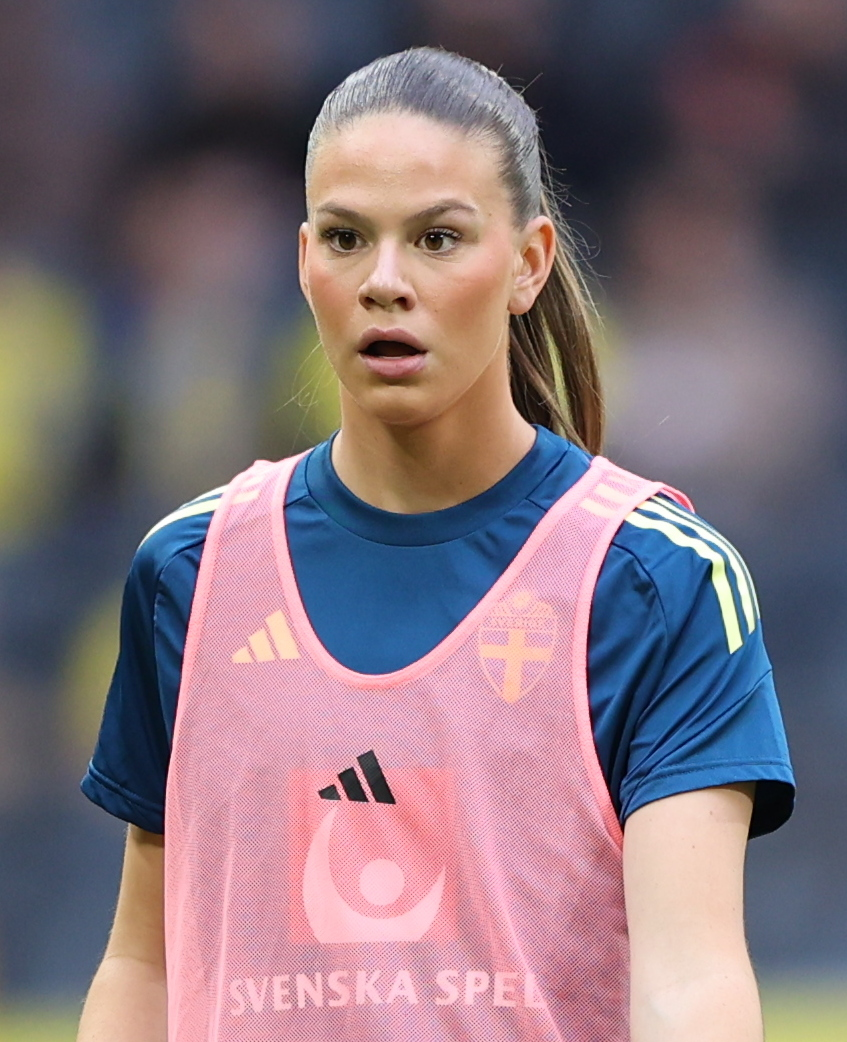
- Andersson with Sweden in 2026

Personal information
- Full name: Bella Astrid Christina Andersson
- Date of birth: 12 July 2006 (age 20)
- Place of birth: Stockholm, Sweden
- Height: 1.83 m (6 ft 0 in)
- Position: Defender

Team information
- Current team: Real Madrid
- Number: 22

Youth career
- 2010–2019: Ösmo GIF
- 2019–2020: IFK Haninge
- 2020–2024: Hammarby IF

Senior career*
Years	Team	Apps	(Gls)
2022–2025	Hammarby IF	25	(2)
2022	→ Älvsjö AIK (loan)	7	(1)
2023	→ IK Uppsala (loan)	9	(0)
2025–	Real Madrid	21	(1)

International career^{‡}
2022–2023	Sweden U17	19	(1)
2024–2025	Sweden U19	22	(1)
2024–	Sweden U23	4	(0)
2026–	Sweden	8	(0)
- * Club domestic league appearances and goals as of 07:32, 14 October 2026 (UTC) ‡ National team caps and goals as of 7:27, 14 October 2026 (UTC)

Bella Astrid Christina Andersson (born 12 July 2006) is a Swedish professional footballer who plays as a defender for Liga F club Real Madrid and the Sweden national team.

== Club career ==
=== Youth career ===
Andersson joined the Hammarby IF academy in 2020 from Ösmo GIF. In 2022, she was part of the U17 team that won the Swedish Championship gold medal.

=== Hammarby IF ===
Andersson made her debut for Hammarby IF in 2022. In 2023, she spent a year out on loan at IK Uppsala before returning to Hammarby in 2024. In total, she played 25 games in the Damallsvenskan.

=== Real Madrid ===
On 30 July 2025, Andersson joined Real Madrid on a 4-year deal until 30 June 2029. She made her debut starting in a 0-0 draw against Tenerife.

== International career ==
Andersson played in the U-17, U-19, and U-23 levels of the Sweden women's national football team.

She made her debut for the senior national team on 3 March 2026 in a match against Italy, when she was given a start by coach Tony Gustavsson.
