= Lova Lundin =

Swedish footballer

Personal information
- Full name: Lova Elly Linnea Lundin
- Date of birth: 25 October 1998 (age 28)
- Place of birth: Borlänge, Sweden
- Height: 1.72 m (5 ft 8 in)
- Position: Forward

Team information
- Current team: Djurgården
- Number: 19

Youth career
- Torsångs IF

Senior career*
Years	Team	Apps	(Gls)
2013–2018	Kvarnsvedens IK	71	(11)
2018–2020	Umeå IK	53	(21)
2021	Logroño	11	(1)
2021–2022	ASJ Soyaux	3	(0)
2022–	Djurgården	0	(0)
- * Club domestic league appearances and goals as of 15 November 2020.

Lova Elly Linnea Lundin (born 25 October 1998) is a Swedish footballer who plays as a forward for Swedish Damallsvenskan club Djurgården.

== Club career ==
A product of Torsångs IF, Lundin has played at senior level for Kvarnsvedens IK and Umeå IK in Sweden.
