= Emilie Bragstad =

Norwegian footballer (born 2001)

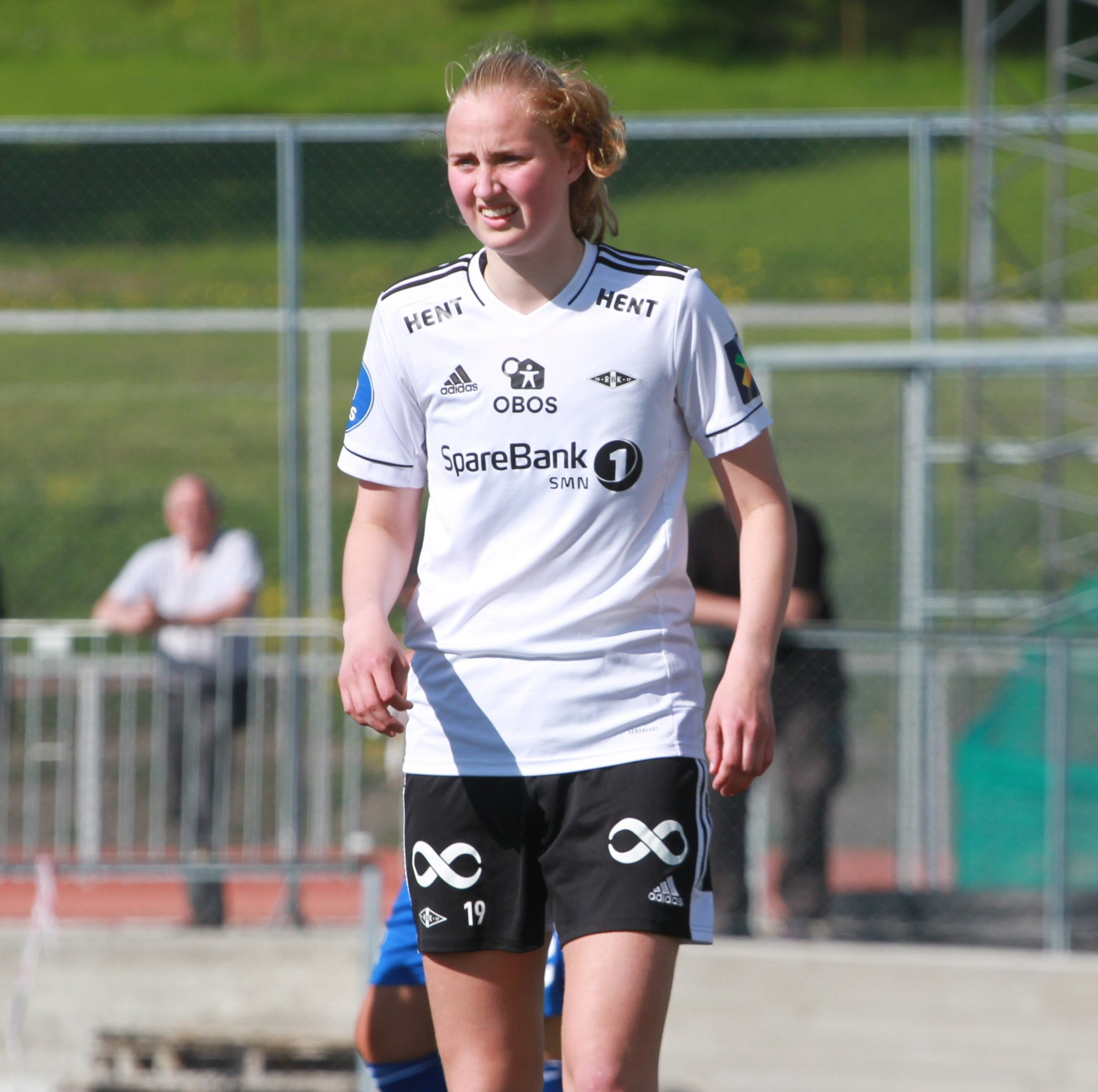
- Bragstad during a Rosenborg match in 2021

Personal information
- Date of birth: 16 December 2001 (age 24)
- Place of birth: Derby, England
- Height: 1.88 m (6 ft 2 in)
- Position: Defender

Team information
- Current team: Hammarby IF
- Number: 2

Youth career
- 2013–2014: Trond
- 2015–2016: Strindheim
- 2017: Rosenborg

Senior career*
Years	Team	Apps	(Gls)
2017–2021	Rosenborg	62	(6)
2022–2024	Bayern Munich	7	(0)
2022	→ Rosenborg (loan)	15	(3)
2022–2023	Bayern Munich II	4	(0)
2023–2024	→ Bayer 04 Leverkusen (loan)	21	(2)
2024–2025	Bayer 04 Leverkusen	10	(0)
2025–	Hammarby IF	41	(4)

International career^{‡}
2016	Norway U15	1	(0)
2017	Norway U16	12	(4)
2018	Norway U17	4	(1)
2018–2020	Norway U19	9	(5)
2022–	Norway U23	20	(1)
2021–	Norway	1	(0)
- * Club domestic league appearances and goals as of 27 September 2026 ‡ National team caps and goals as of 7 April 2025

Emilie Bragstad (born 16 December 2001) is a Norwegian footballer who plays as a defender for Swedish club Hammarby IF and the Norway national team. At the age of 18, UEFA placed her on their list of ten players to watch in 2020.

== Club career ==
In her youth, Bragstad played for Trond and Strindheim before she joined at the time Trondheims-Ørn (now Rosenborg) in 2017.

She was part of the team when Rosenborg came second in Toppserien in both 2020 and 2021. They were also undefeated in Toppserien 2020, and according to UEFA (in their follow up on the ten players to watch in 2020) she played an important role in the team that year. In 2021, she got nominated to the young player of the year in Toppserien.

In January 2022, when Bragstad was 20 years old and already had played 5 seasons in Toppserien, she signed a contract until 30 June 2025 for German side Bayern Munich. She decided to stay on loan in Rosenborg until summer 2022 since she wanted to be part of the Norway national team during Euro 2022, and to achieve that it was important to play enough matches during the spring.

During the 2022–23 season, she made 14 appearances for senior Bayern Munich team, and played four matches for the reserve team. In June 2023, she was loaned out to fellow German club Bayer 04 Leverkusen. Upon the conclusion of the 2023–24 season, her transfer to Leverkusen became permanent, by signing a two-year contract.

== International career ==
Bragstad has played matches for the Norway youth national teams U15, U16, U17, U19, and U23.

At the age of 17, she got selected to part of the Norwegian team for the 2019 UEFA Under-19 Championship. During the championship, she scored 3 goals.

She got called up to the Norway national team for the first time in September 2020, but had withdraw due to a knee injury. In April 2021, she got called up again. She got her debut during her third call up (excluding the one she had to withdraw from), in the match against Armenia on Ullevaal Stadion, which Norway won 10–0. The match was on 16 September 2021, and was the same match Guro Bergsvand debuted in.

== Style of play ==
Bragstad usually plays as a defender, but has also played as a striker at Norway U19, as well as centre midfielder and winger in other situations. According to herself and her father, Bjørn Otto Bragstad, this has made her into a centre-back that has a bigger role in the game, having good technique and taking the ball with her higher up on the field. Martin Sjögren adds that she has good overview and is good in duels. The jury that nominated her to the young player of the year in 2021, agrees in that she has good technique, good at bringing the ball with her towards the opponent's goal, and often wins aerial duels. They conclude she has all the prerequisites needed to become one of the world's best centre-backs.

== Personal life ==
She is daughter of the retired football player Bjørn Otto Bragstad.

== Honours ==
Bayern Munich

- Frauen-Bundesliga: 2022–23
