= Ope =

- Location within Jämtland Location within Sweden
- Coordinates: 63°08′N 14°45′E
- Country: Sweden
- Province: Jämtland
- County: Jämtland County
- Municipality: Östersund Municipality

Area
  - Total: 0.85 km^{2} (0.33 sq mi)

Population (31 December 2010)
  - Total: 453
  - Density: 535/km^{2} (1,390/sq mi)
- Time zone: UTC+1 (CET)
  - Summer (DST): UTC+2 (CEST)

Ope (Swedish pronunciation: [ˈûːpɛ]) is a locality situated in Östersund Municipality, Jämtland County, Sweden with 453 inhabitants in 2010.
