= Hyssna IF =

Swedish football club

- Full name: Hyssna Idrottsförening
- Founded: 1948
- Ground: Ekäng; Hyssna; Sweden
- Chairman: Mats Börjesson
- League: Division 4 Västergötland Södra
Home colours	Away colours

Hyssna IF is a Swedish football club located in Hyssna.

== Background ==
Hyssna IF currently plays in Division 4 Västergötland Södra which is the sixth tier of Swedish football. They play their home matches at the Ekäng in Hyssna.

The club is affiliated to Västergötlands Fotbollförbund.

== Season to season ==
Season	Level	Division	Section	Position	Movements
2006*	Tier 7	Division 5	Västergötland Södra	4th	
2007	Tier 7	Division 5	Västergötland Södra	2nd	Promotion Playoffs
2008	Tier 7	Division 5	Västergötland Sydvästra	5th	
2009	Tier 7	Division 5	Västergötland Södra	3rd	
2010	Tier 7	Division 5	Västergötland Södra	2nd	Promotion Playoffs – Promoted
2011	Tier 6	Division 4	Västergötland Södra		

* League restructuring in 2006 resulted in a new division being created at Tier 3 and subsequent divisions dropping a level.
