= Shiho Matsubara =

Japanese footballer (born 1997)

Shiho Matsubara 松原 志歩
Personal information
- Full name: Shiho Matsubara
- Date of birth: 7 July 1997 (age 29)
- Place of birth: Takaishi, Japan
- Height: 1.62 m (5 ft 4 in)
- Position: Defender

Team information
- Current team: Piteå
- Number: 8

Youth career
- Erba
- Cerezo Osaka

Senior career*
Years	Team	Apps	(Gls)
2013–2020	Cerezo Osaka	109	(32)
2019–2020	→ Albirex Niigata (loan)	32	(0)
2021–2023	Sanfrecce Hiroshima	8	(0)
2023–2025	Fortuna Hjørring	43	(1)
2025–	Piteå	14	(2)

International career
2013	Japan U16		
2014	Japan U17	6	(2)
2016	Japan U20	5	(2)
- * Club domestic league appearances and goals as of 22 February 2026

Shiho Matsubara (松原 志歩, Matsubara Shiho; pronounced [matsɯbaɾa ɕiho]; born 7 July 1997) is a Japanese professional footballer who plays as a defender for Damallsvenskan club Piteå IF. She previously played for Nadeshiko League and WE League clubs Cerezo Osaka Sakai, Albirex Niigata and Sanfrecce Hiroshima Regina, and for Kvindeliga club Fortuna Hjørring.

Matsubara is the older sister of Yuna Matsubara, who is also a professional footballer (currently playing for WE League club INAC Kobe Leonessa).

== Early life ==
Matsubara was born on 7 July 1997 in Takaishi, Osaka Prefecture.

Matsubara began playing football (alongside younger sister, Yuna, who is also a professional footballer) in the third grade of elementary school, inspired by her brother. She played with boys at Erba FC, before joining Cerezo Osaka Sakai's under-15s team in junior high school. At the time, she was playing as a forward.

After graduating from senior high school, Matsubara attended university at Mukogawa Women's University Junior College Division, a private junior college in Nishinomiya, Hyōgo Prefecture. Whilst playing, she became a coach at Cerezo Osaka Soccer School.

== Club career ==
=== Cerezo Osaka Sakai ===
Matsubara was developed as an academy product of Cerezo Osaka Sakai. She played her 100th Nadeshiko League game for the club on 4 June 2018 in a Division 1 match against Urawa Red Diamonds away from home.

=== Albirex Niigata ===
In 2019, Matsubara was loaned out to Albirex Niigata for the 2019 season. In 2020, her loan was extended for another year until the end of the 2020 season.

=== Sanfrecce Hiroshima Regina ===
In 2021, Matsubara signed for Sanfrecce Hiroshima Regina ahead of the 2021–22 season, the inaugural season of the WE League (which was previously known as the Nadeshiko League, which became the second division).

In 2023, following the conclusion of the 2022–23 season, Matsubara departed the club to pursue an opportunity overseas.

=== Fortuna Hjørring ===
In 2023, Matsubara moved to Denmark and signed for Kvindeliga club Fortuna Hjørring ahead of the 2023–24 season.

=== Piteå IF ===
In 2025, Matsubara moved to Sweden and signed for Damallsvenskan club Piteå IF during the 2025 season.

== International career ==
Matsubara was part of the Japan under-16 national team squad that won the 2013 AFC U-16 Women's Championship in Nanjing, China.

Matsubara was part of the Japan under-17 national team's squad that won the 2014 FIFA U-17 Women's World Cup in Costa Rica. She scored two goals in the tournament.

Matsubara was part of the Japan under-20 national team's squad for the 2016 FIFA U-20 Women's World Cup in Papua New Guinea. Japan finished third in the tournament. She scored twice in the tournament, having scored a brace in Japan's 3–1 quarter-final win over Brazil at PNG Football Stadium in Port Moresby on 24 November.

In 2020, Matsubara received her first call-up for the Japan senior national team, being called up for the Nadeshiko Challenge Training Camp, a three-day training camp held from 7 to 9 December.
