= Hyssna =

- Location within Västra Götaland Location within Sweden
- Coordinates: 57°34′N 12°32′E
- Country: Sweden
- Province: Västergötland
- County: Västra Götaland County
- Municipality: Mark Municipality

Area
  - Total: 1.63 km^{2} (0.63 sq mi)

Population (31 December 2010)
  - Total: 638
  - Density: 393/km^{2} (1,020/sq mi)
- Time zone: UTC+1 (CET)
  - Summer (DST): UTC+2 (CEST)

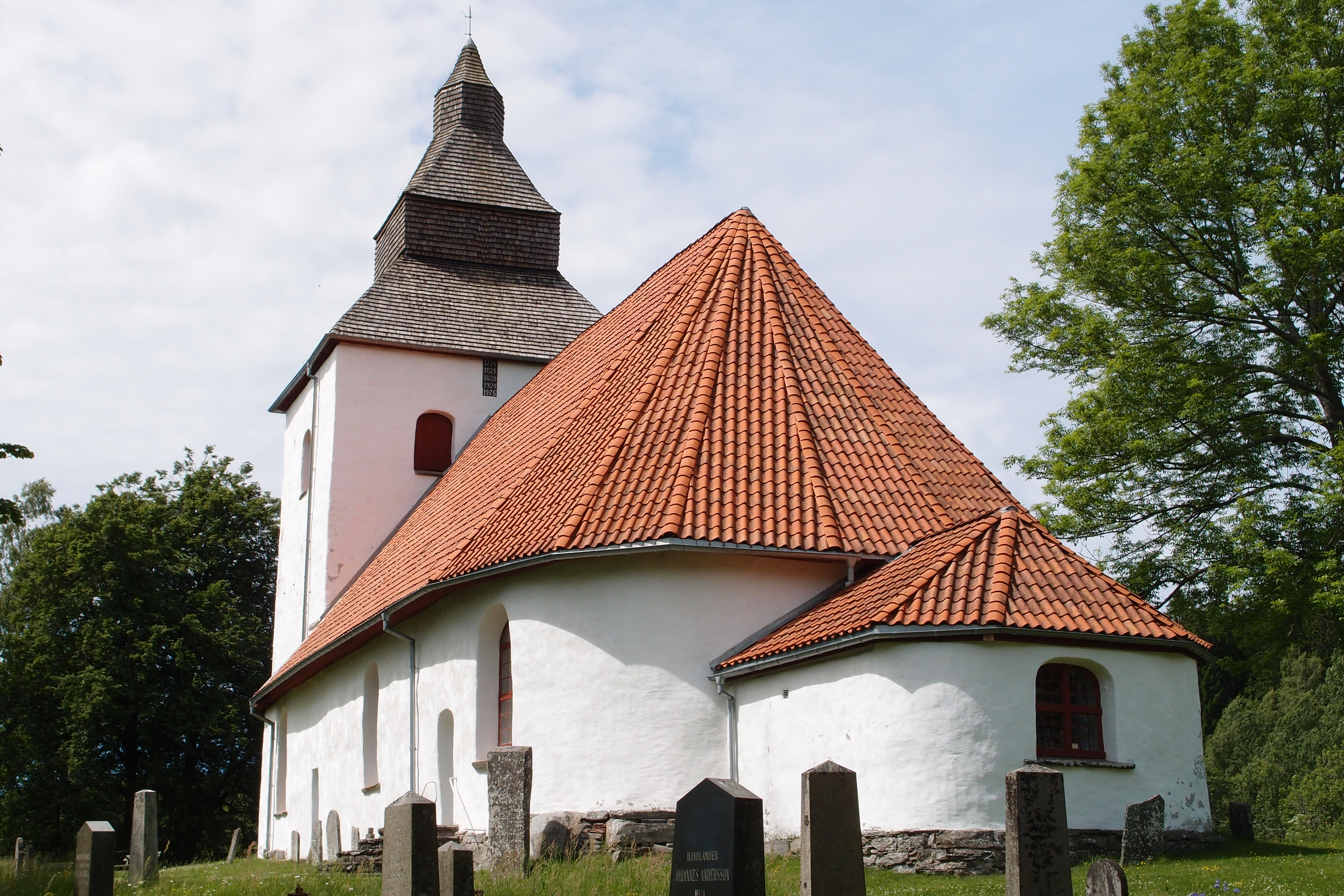
Hyssna Old Church

Hyssna is a locality situated in Mark Municipality, Västra Götaland County, Sweden. It had 728 inhabitants in 2019.

Claes Johannson, a Swedish wrestler and Olympic medalist, was born here

== Events ==
Between 2005 and 2008, Hyssna was home to Fredrik Nordström's recording studio Studio Fredman. In 2008, the studio was relocated back to Gothenburg.

== Sports ==
The following sports clubs are located in Hyssna:

- Hyssna IF
