= Urara Watanabe =

Japanese footballer (born 2002)

Personal information
- Date of birth: 8 April 2002 (age 24)
- Place of birth: Kyoto Prefecture, Japan
- Height: 1.60 m (5 ft 3 in)
- Position: Midfielder

Team information
- Current team: Djurgården
- Number: 23

Youth career
- Kyoto Shiko
- Forest Kyoto
- Nishikyogoku JSC

Senior career*
Years	Team	Apps	(Gls)
2015–2020	JFA Academy Fukushima	50	(7)
2021–2025	Nittaidai Yokohama	81	(9)
2025–	Djurgården	44	(12)

International career^{‡}
2022	Japan U20	1	(0)
- * Club domestic league appearances and goals as of 4 October 2026 ‡ National team caps and goals as of 4 October 2026

Urara Watanabe (渡部麗, Watanabe Urara; pronounced [ɰa̠ta̠na̠be̞ ɯɾa̠ɾa̠]; born 8 April 2002) is a Japanese professional footballer who plays as a midfielder for Damallsvenskan club Djurgårdens IF.

== Early life ==
Watanabe was born on 8 April 2002 in Kyoto Prefecture, Japan. Inspired by her two older brothers, she began playing football at the age of five, and began dreaming of being a professional footballer when she was in the first grade of elementary school. She began attending Nippon Sport Science University (NSSU) in 2021.

== Club career ==
=== JFA Academy Fukushima ===
Ahead of the 2015 season, Watanabe joined Nadeshiko League Division 2 West (NLD2W) club JFA Academy Fukushima at the age of 13.

=== Nittaidai SMG Yokohama ===
Ahead of the 2021 season, Watanabe signed for Nadeshiko League Division 1 (NLD1) club Nittaidai SMG Yokohama whilst studying at Nippon Sport Science University (NSSU or Nittaidai), a private university in the Aoba ward of Yokohama, Kanagawa Prefecture.

At the end of the 2023 season, Watanabe was named in the Nadeshiko League's Best 11.

=== Djurgårdens IF ===
Ahead of the 2025 season, Watanabe signed for Damallsvenskan club Djurgårdens IF.

== International career ==
Watanabe was selected for the Japan under-20 national team by manager Futoshi Ikeda as part of Japan's 21-player squad for the 2022 FIFA U-20 Women's World Cup in Costa Rica, held from 10 to 28 August 2022. She made her début and only appearance on 14 August 2022, coming on as a substitute in the second minute of second-half stoppage time in a 2–0 victory over Ghana at the Estadio Alejandro Morera Soto in Alajuela. Japan, who were the defending champions, finished runners-up at the tournament.

== Career statistics ==
=== Club ===
As of 4 October 2026

Appearances and goals by club, season and competition
Club	Season	League			Domestic cup			Total	
Club	Season	Division	Apps	Goals	Cup	Apps	Goals	Apps	Goals
JFA Academy Fukushima	2015	Nadeshiko League Division 2 West	0	0	Empress' Cup	0	0	0	0
JFA Academy Fukushima	2016	Nadeshiko League Division 2 West	1	0	Empress' Cup	0	0	1	0
JFA Academy Fukushima	2017	Nadeshiko League Division 2 West	7	1	Empress' Cup	1	0	8	1
JFA Academy Fukushima	2018	Nadeshiko League Division 2 West	15	2	Empress' Cup	2	0	17	2
JFA Academy Fukushima	2019	Nadeshiko League Division 2 West	18	3	Empress' Cup	2	0	20	3
JFA Academy Fukushima	2020	Nadeshiko League Division 2 West	9	1	Empress' Cup	1	0	10	1
JFA Academy Fukushima	Total		50	7	Total	6	0	56	7
Nittaidai Yokohama	2021	Nadeshiko League Division 1	21	1	Empress' Cup	1	0	22	1
Nittaidai Yokohama	2022	Nadeshiko League Division 1	18	3	Empress' Cup	1	0	19	3
Nittaidai Yokohama	2023	Nadeshiko League Division 1	21	3	Empress' Cup	4	1	25	4
Nittaidai Yokohama	2024	Nadeshiko League Division 1	21	2	Empress' Cup	1	0	22	1
Nittaidai Yokohama	Total		81	9	Total	7	1	88	10
Djurgården	2025	Damallsvenskan	25	5	Svenska Cupen	2	0	27	5
Djurgården	2026	Damallsvenskan	20	7	Svenska Cupen	5	1	25	8
Djurgården	Total		45	12	Total	7	1	52	13
Career total			176	28	Total	20	2	196	30

=== International ===
Appearances and goals by national team and year
National team	Year	Apps	Goals
Japan U20	2022	1	0
Career total		1	0

== Honours ==
Japan U20

- FIFA U-20 Women's World Cup

Runners-up: 2022
