= Vilde Hasund =

Norwegian footballer (born 1997)

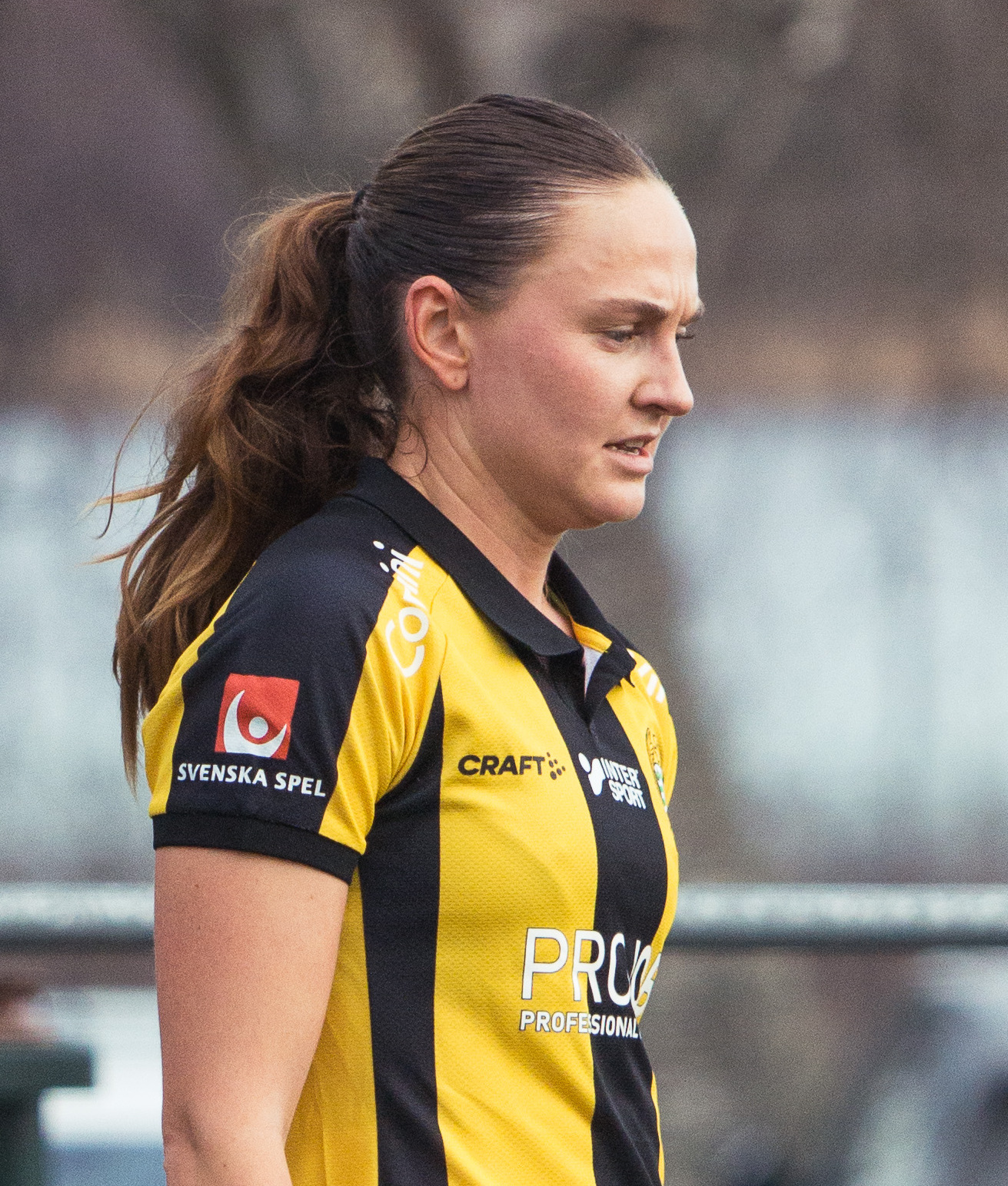
- Hasund with Hammarby IF in 2025

Personal information
- Date of birth: 27 June 1997 (age 29)
- Place of birth: Norway
- Height: 1.72 m (5 ft 8 in)
- Position: Midfielder

Team information
- Current team: Hammarby IF
- Number: 20

Youth career
- Åheim IL
- Hødd

Senior career*
Years	Team	Apps	(Gls)
2013–2014	Hødd	31	(12)
2014–2017	Røa	63	(7)
2018–2019	Lyn	46	(7)
2020–2021	Sandviken	36	(9)
2022–	Hammarby IF	118	(30)

International career^{‡}
2015–2016	Norway U19	17	(4)
2017–2020	Norway U23	14	(5)
2021–	Norway	3	(1)
- * Club domestic league appearances and goals as of 22 November 2026 ‡ National team caps and goals as of 25 November 2021

Vilde Hasund (born 27 June 1997) is a Norwegian footballer who plays as a midfielder for Hammarby IF in Damallsvenskan. In 2022 she was called up to the Norway national team.

== Club career ==
She started playing football as a five-year-old in Åheim IL. As a 15-year-old, she went to Hødd in the 2nd division, where she quickly established herself as an important player. At the age of 17, she moved to Oslo to play for Røa in the Toppserien. She played for Røa for three and a half years before going to Lyn before the 2018 season. The development continued in Lyn and after two seasons at the club she went to Sandviken before the 2020 season.

In 2021 Hasund won the Toppserien, the highest football league in Norway. She was the tenth top scorer in the league with 6 goals in the season. She was a key player when the club won this first league gold. After two seasons in the Bergen club, she signed in December 2021 for Hammarby in the Damallsvenskan.

== International career ==
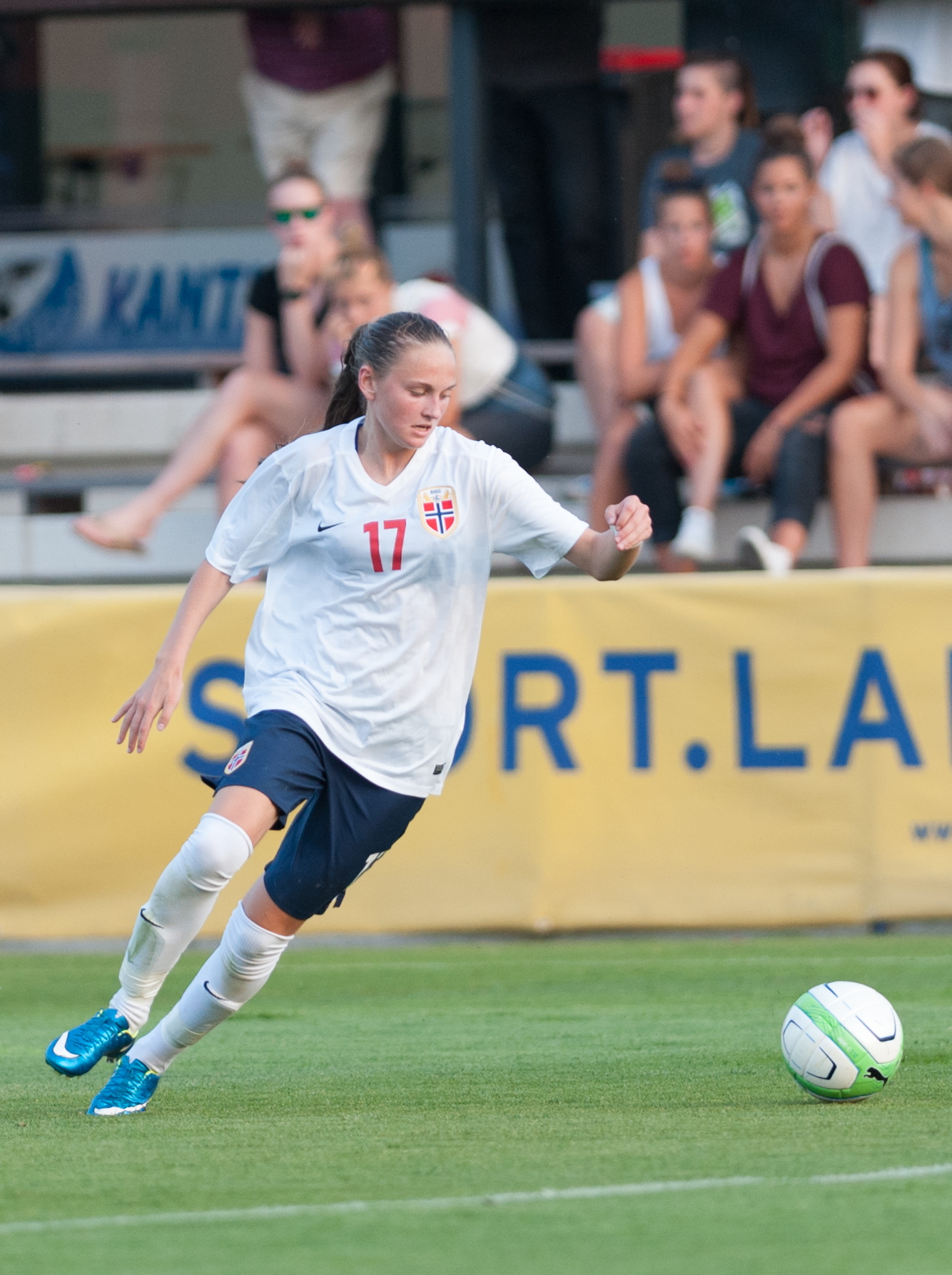
Vilde Hasund in Norway U19, 2015

Hasund began to be called up by the Norwegian Football Federation (NFF) in 2015, initially to wear the jersey of the Under-23 team. She made her debut in friendlies on 24 January in the match lost against Norway of the same age group, before coming included in the squad for the La Manga tournament the following March and for the elite qualifying phase for the 2015 European Championship in Israel. In this phase she was used in all three matches of her national team, resulting decisive for access to the final phase with the brace that she scored on 6 April in the 2-0 victory over Switzerland. Also in the squad for the final phase, she took the field in two of the three matches in group B in the first elimination phase, with Norway already eliminated in the group phase with one win, one draw, and one defeat.

Remained in quota also for the subsequent qualifications for the 2016 European Championship in Slovakia, totals, between friendlies and official matches of the UEFA tournament, another 8 appearances of which 2 in the group stage of her second European category before elimination from the tournament.

Between 2017 and 2020, she made 14 appearances, all in friendly matches, in the Under-23s.

She was called up to the senior national team by coach Martin Sjögren for qualifying in group F of the UEFA zone for the 2023 World Cup in Australia and New Zealand. She made her debut on 25 November 2021, in the match she won 7-0 against Albania, substituting for Frida Maanum in the 80th minute. She scored one minute later.
