= Kristianstads Fotbollsarena =

Football stadium in Kristianstad, Sweden

- Kristianstads Arena
- Interactive map of Kristianstads Fotbollsarena
- Address: Poppelvägen 12, 291 59; Kristianstad, Sweden
- Coordinates: 56.017598°N 14.139435°E
- Capacity: 2,500
- Surface: Hybrid

Construction
- Opened: 2018

Tenants
- Kristianstads DFF (women's football); Kristianstad FC (men's football); Kristianstad Predators (American football)

Kristianstads Fotbollsarena (lit. 'Kristianstad's Football Arena') is a football stadium in Kristianstad, Skåne County, Sweden. The arena opened in April 2018 and is the home stadium of two teams, women's Damallsvenskan club Kristianstads DFF and men's Division 2 club Kristianstad FC.

In 2013, local clubs in several sports proposed to develop the area around Kristianstads Arena to include more sports facilities. The first new stadium was Kristianstads Fotbollarena. It was opened in April 2018 by women's national team manager Peter Gerhardsson as well as two local politicians, followed by intra-Scanian derbies for both men and women (Kristianstads DFF vs. Vittsjö GIK and Kristianstad FC vs. Lunds BK). On the second day, there would be activities for visitors as well as an American football match.

Hybrid grass, a mixture of natural grass and artificial turf, was chosen for the playing surface. It became one of the least liked pitches in the Damallsvenskan.

In 2021 it was used for the 2021–22 UEFA Women's Champions League qualifying mini-tournament featuring Kristianstad and three other clubs.

Nosaby IF, which is based elsewhere in Kristianstad Municipality, applied to play at the arena in both 2022 and 2024, but were turned down in order to limit the number of matches held at the arena. Only "elite teams" could come into consideration.

The stadium is also used by American football team Kristianstad Predators, as well as select matches for the Sweden national youth team in the same sport.

== Facilities ==
The catering at the stadium would be done by Skepparslövs Golfkro, a golf course café at Skepparslöv.
