= Tabby Tindell =

American football player

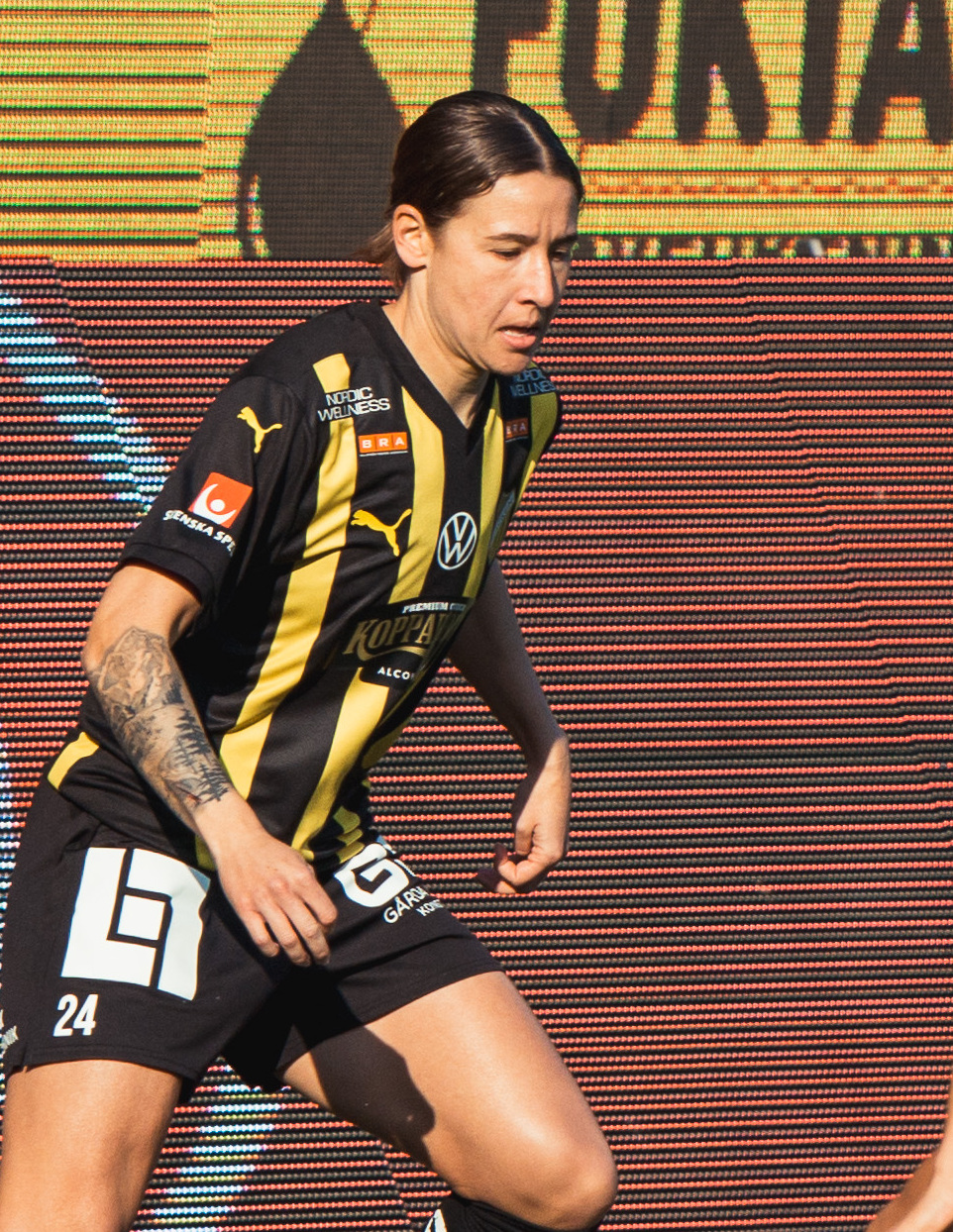
- Tindell with BK Häcken in 2025

Personal information
- Full name: Tabitha Michelle Tindell
- Date of birth: August 25, 1995 (age 31)
- Place of birth: Ocala, Florida, United States
- Height: 5 ft 5 in (1.65 m)
- Positions: Midfielder; forward

Team information
- Current team: BK Häcken
- Number: 24

Youth career
- 2010–2013: Trinity HS

College career
Years	Team	Apps	(Gls)
2013–2016	Florida Gulf Coast Eagles	74	(66)

Senior career*
Years	Team	Apps	(Gls)
2019–2021	IFK Kalmar	63	(39)
2022–2024	Kristianstad	62	(26)
2024–	BK Häcken	35	(12)
- * Club domestic league appearances and goals as of 18:02, December 7, 2025 (UTC)

Tabitha Michelle Tindell (born August 25, 1995) is an American professional soccer player who plays as a midfielder for Damallsvenskan club BK Häcken. She previously played for IFK Kalmar in the Elitettan and Kristianstad in the Damallsvenskan. She played college soccer for the Florida Gulf Coast Eagles, setting multiple program records.

== Early life ==
Tindell attended Trinity High School in Ocala, Florida, where she played girls' soccer. She scored 160 career goals and 80 career assists, including a 44-goal/40-assist campaign in her sophomore season that led all high school players in the United States in points. Trinity won the Florida High School Athletic Association 2A State Championship in 2013, the program's first, with Tindell scoring 52 goals and 30 assists on the season and hat-tricks in four of five playoff matches, including the championship match.

== College career ==
Tindell joined Florida Gulf Coast University in 2013 and played for the Florida Gulf Coast Eagles women's soccer team. As a freshman she set a single-season university record with 15 goals scored, then broke the record in the following season with 20, in which she also became the program's all-time leading goalscorer. Her 8th-second goal against Lipscomb on October 12, 2014, was one of the fastest from kickoff in NCAA history.

She finished her career as the Eagles' all-time leading scorer with 66 goals and 162 points, both of which set university and ASUN Conference records. She scored 31 career game-winning goals, the second-most in NCAA history, and became the program's only two-time All-American after being named in 2014 (second team) and 2016 (third team). The ASUN Conference named her its women's soccer player of the year in 2014, 2015, and 2016.

== Club career ==
=== IFK Kalmar, 2019–2021 ===
Tindell signed with Swedish second-division Elitettan club IFK Kalmar in 2019, and scored a brace in her debut. A jury of team captains and media representatives named her the Elitettan's player of the month in May 2021 following her hat-trick against Brommapojkarna in a 4–0 victory.

She scored a total of 39 goals in 63 appearances in three seasons with the club. Kalmar finished as league runners-up to Umeå IK in 2021, her final season with the club, in which Kalmar won promotion to the top-flight Damallsvenskan. Her 19 goals in the 2021 Elitettan were second-most on the season behind Henna-Riikka Honkanen's 22.

=== Kristianstads DFF, 2022–2024 ===
Tindell and IFK Kalmar teammate Klara Rybrink together signed with top-flight Damallsvenskan club Kristianstads DFF in November 2021. In her first Svenska Cupen match with the club, she scored four goals against Ifö Bromölla. Tindell's 14 goals in 25 league appearances during the 2022 Damallsvenskan was third-most on the season, behind Amalie Vangsgaard of Linköpings FC and Tindell's teammate Évelyne Viens, despite suffering a mid-season knee injury.

=== BK Häcken, 2024– ===
Tindell joined BK Häcken in the middle of the 2024 season.

== Honors and awards ==
Florida Gulf Coast Eagles

- ASUN women's soccer tournament: 2014, 2015, 2016

BK Häcken

- Damallsvenskan: 2025, 2026
- UEFA Women's Europa Cup: 2025–26

Individual

- Atlantic Sun Player of the Year: 2014, 2015, 2016
- Atlantic Sun Freshman of the Year: 2013
- Third-team All-American: 2016
- First-team All-ASUN: 2013, 2014, 2015, 2016

== See also ==
- List of foreign Damallsvenskan players

Sporting positions
Preceded by (Austria) Sarah Zadrazil (East Tennessee State Buccaneers)	ASUN Player of the Year; 2014, 2015, 2016	Succeeded by (United States) Ellen Lundy (Lipscomb Bisons)
