= Växjö DFF =

Swedish women's association football club

- Full name: Växjö Damfotbollsförening
- Founded: 2014; 12 years ago
- Ground: Spiris Arena, Växjö
- Capacity: 12,000
- Chairman: Laura Solterbeck
- Coach: Olof Unogård
- League: Damallsvenskan
- 2025: 10th Damallsvenskan
- Website: http://www.vaxjodff.se
Home colours

Växjö DFF (Swedish: [ˈvɛ̂kːɧøː deːɛfɛf]) is a football club from Växjö, in Kronoberg County, Sweden. The club was established in 2014 and was promoted into the women's premier division Damallsvenskan for the first time in 2017.

The club play their home games at Visma Arena in Växjö. The team colours are black and purple. The club is affiliated to the Smålands Fotbollförbund.

In 2021, Växjö DFF was relegated from Damallsvenskan after losing an away game 0–5 to Linköping FC on 14 October. In 2022, they were again promoted to premier division Damallsvenskan again.

== History ==
Växjö DFF was formed in 2014, through a merger of the women's association Växjö FF and Hovshaga AIF's women's football section. The club took over a place in the Division 1 (Swedish women's football), and finished second in the 2014 season behind IFK Kalmar. The following season, Växjö DFF won the 2015 series and defeated IF Böljan in the promotion qualifier with a combined score of 9–0 over two matches, finishing first in the Division 1 and securing the club;s promotion to the Elitettan for the 2016 season. The 2016 Elitettan season was Växjö DFF's first season in the 2nd level in the Swedish women football pyramid, Växjö DFF finished third behind Hammarby Fotboll (women) by two points. For the 2017 season Växjö DFF won the series and for the first time in club history qualified for the Damallsvenskan.

== Current squad ==
As of 28 August 2026

Note: Flags indicate national team as defined under FIFA eligibility rules; some limited exceptions apply. Players may hold more than one non-FIFA nationality.

No.	Pos.	Nation	Player
1	GK	DEN	Maja Bay Østergaard
2	DF	SWE	Elvira Hammarbäck
4	DF	FIN	Mimmi Nurmela
5	DF	SWE	Emma Holmqvist
6	MF	SWE	Ebba Wieder
7	DF	SWE	Nellie Karlsson
8	FW	SWE	Maja Bodin
9	FW	ISL	Bryndis Nielsdóttir
10	MF	SWE	Victoria Svanström
11	DF	SWE	Sophia Redenstrand
14	FW	GRE	Vasiliki Giannaka

No.	Pos.	Nation	Player
16	MF	SWE	Alexandra Larsson
17	DF	SWE	Tilde Johansson
18	DF	FIN	Helmi Raijas
19	FW	USA	Larkin Russell
20	MF	JPN	Miho Kamogawa
21	FW	BUL	Dessislava Dupay
26	MF	JPN	Suzu Amano
27	DF	SWE	Josefine Harrysson
33	MF	SWE	Elin Nilsson
99	GK	SWE	Cornelia Sundelius
—	MF	SWE	Freja Ekstrand
—	DF	SWE	Ella Nilsson
—	MF	JPN	Suzu Amano

=== Out on loan ===
Note: Flags indicate national team as defined under FIFA eligibility rules; some limited exceptions apply. Players may hold more than one non-FIFA nationality.

No.	Pos.	Nation	Player

=== Former players ===
For details of current and former players, see Category:Växjö DFF players.

== Honours ==
- Elitettan (Tier 2)
  - Winners: 2017
