= 2014 UEFA Women's Under-19 Championship qualification =

Football tournament qualification stage

The qualification for the 2014 UEFA Women's Under-19 Championship were a series of association football matches between national teams to determine the participants of the 2014 Final Tournament held in Norway.

All times are CEST (UTC+02:00).

== Qualifying round ==
The 48 teams were divided into 11 groups of four teams, with each group being contested as a mini-tournament, hosted by one of the group's teams. After all matches have been played, the 11 group winners and 10 best runners-up will advance to the Second qualifying round.

The draw was made on 20 November 2012 at UEFA headquarters in Nyon.

Norway qualified as hosts, while England, Spain and Germany received byes to the second round as the sides with the highest coefficients.

The first round matches were played between 21 and 26 September 2013.

=== Seeding ===
Seeding for the pots of the draw was based on the qualifying matches of the past three seasons with some bonus points for final tournament results. The hosts of the eleven mini-tournament groups are annotated with an H.

=== Tiebreakers ===
Tie-breakers between teams with the same number of points are:

1. Higher number of points obtained in the matches played between the teams in question
2. Superior goal difference resulting from the matches played between the teams in question
3. Higher number of goals scored in the matches played between the teams in question

If now two teams still are tied, reapply tie-breakers 1–3, if this does not break the tie, go on.

1. Superior goal difference in all group matches
2. Higher number of goals scored in all group matches
3. Drawing of lots

=== Group 1 ===
| Pos | Team | Pld | W | D | L | GF | GA | GD | Pts |
|---|---|---|---|---|---|---|---|---|---|
| 1 | Austria (H) | 3 | 3 | 0 | 0 | 15 | 0 | +15 | 9 |
| 2 | Croatia | 3 | 2 | 0 | 1 | 8 | 6 | +2 | 6 |
| 3 | Azerbaijan | 3 | 1 | 0 | 2 | 6 | 5 | +1 | 3 |
| 4 | Israel | 3 | 0 | 0 | 3 | 0 | 18 | −18 | 0 |

(H) Hosts
21 September 2013
11:00

| Croatia | 3–1 | Azerbaijan |
|---|---|---|
| Conjar 27' (pen.), 74'; Gaiser 40' | Report | Jalilli 12' |

Lindabrunn Stadium, Lindabrunn
Attendance: 60
Referee: Amy Rayner (England)
21 September 2013
16:00

| Austria | 8–0 | Israel |
|---|---|---|
| Krammer 5', 29'; Billa 20', 38', 71'; Charwat 54' (pen.); Leitner 62'; Gatea 90+3' | Report |

Lindabrunn Stadium, Lindabrunn
Attendance: 170
Referee: Tania Fernandes Morais (Luxembourg)

23 September 2013
11:00

| Israel | 0–5 | Croatia |
|---|---|---|
| | Report | Dujmović 9', 27'; Stanić 17'; Šćukanec-Hopinski 76'; Conjar 79' |

Lindabrunn Stadium, Lindabrunn
Attendance: 50
Referee: Tania Fernandes Morais (Luxembourg)
23 September 2013
16:00

| Austria | 2–0 | Azerbaijan |
|---|---|---|
| Hasler 31'; Bauer 42' | Report |

Sportzentrum, Trumau
Attendance: 150
Referee: Donka Jeleva-Terzieva (Bulgaria)

26 September 2013
16:00

| Croatia | 0–5 | Austria |
|---|---|---|
| | Report | Bauer 26', 64'; Billa 72'; Mahr 90'; Schwarzlmüller 90+3' |

Sportzentrum, Trumau
Attendance: 350
Referee: Amy Rayner (England)
26 September 2013
16:00

| Azerbaijan | 5–0 | Israel |
|---|---|---|
| Anaya 26'; Nasirova 33'; Jalilli 62'; Taylor 75'; Perarnau 83' | Report |

Lindabrunn Stadium, Lindabrunn
Attendance: 40
Referee: Donka Jeleva-Terzieva (Bulgaria)

=== Group 2 ===
| Pos | Team | Pld | W | D | L | GF | GA | GD | Pts |
|---|---|---|---|---|---|---|---|---|---|
| 1 | Denmark | 3 | 2 | 1 | 0 | 16 | 2 | +14 | 7 |
| 2 | Republic of Ireland (H) | 3 | 2 | 1 | 0 | 12 | 3 | +9 | 7 |
| 3 | Greece | 3 | 1 | 0 | 2 | 4 | 7 | −3 | 3 |
| 4 | Kazakhstan | 3 | 0 | 0 | 3 | 0 | 20 | −20 | 0 |

(H) Hosts
21 September 2013
14:00

| Denmark | 4–0 | Greece |
|---|---|---|
| Hansen 45+1', 84'; Madsen 49'; Larsen 52' | Report |

Dalymount Park, Dublin
Attendance: 50
Referee: Florence Guillemin (France)
21 September 2013
14:00

| Republic of Ireland | 7–0 | Kazakhstan |
|---|---|---|
| Shine 23', 34', 43'; McCabe 26', 72'; Newman 30'; Mustaki 84' | Report |

Dalymount Park, Dublin
Attendance: 250
Referee: Désirée Grundbacher (Switzerland)

23 September 2013
14:00

| Denmark | 10–0 | Kazakhstan |
|---|---|---|
| Sara Andersen 2'; Fisker 12'; Hansen 15', 36', 56'; Bobrova 40' (o.g.); Arngrimsen 48', 53'; Ringsing 86' (pen.); Jensen 90+1' | Report |

Tallaght Stadium, Dublin
Attendance: 20
Referee: Désirée Grundbacher (Switzerland)
23 September 2013
14:00

| Greece | 1–3 | Republic of Ireland |
|---|---|---|
| Papadopoulou 70' | Report | McCabe 24', 44' (pen.); O'Connor 67' |

Tallaght Stadium, Dublin
Attendance: 320
Referee: Ivana Vlaic (Bosnia and Herzegovina)

26 September 2013
14:00

| Republic of Ireland | 2–2 | Denmark |
|---|---|---|
| Shine 26'; Carson 70' | Report | Fisker 66'; Jensen 76' |

Tolka Park Dublin
Attendance: 200
Referee: Florence Guillemin (France)
26 September 2013
14:00

| Kazakhstan | 0–3 | Greece |
|---|---|---|
| | Report | Georgiou 17'; Chamalidou 27' (pen.); Markou 78' |

Richmond Park, Dublin
Attendance: 20
Referee: Ivana Vlaic (Bosnia and Herzegovina)

=== Group 3 ===
| Pos | Team | Pld | W | D | L | GF | GA | GD | Pts |
|---|---|---|---|---|---|---|---|---|---|
| 1 | Sweden | 3 | 3 | 0 | 0 | 21 | 1 | +20 | 9 |
| 2 | Portugal | 3 | 2 | 0 | 1 | 11 | 3 | +8 | 6 |
| 3 | Estonia | 3 | 1 | 0 | 2 | 2 | 15 | −13 | 3 |
| 4 | Lithuania (H) | 3 | 0 | 0 | 3 | 0 | 15 | −15 | 0 |

(H) Hosts
20 September 2013
12:00

| Sweden | 8–1 | Estonia |
|---|---|---|
| Welin 11'; Blackstenius 35', 38', 44', 56'; Wahlberg 40', 64' (pen.); Curmark 49' | Report | Läänmäe 78' |

SRC Alytus, Alytus
Attendance: 25
Referee: Sofia Karagiorgi (Cyprus)
21 September 2013
15:00

| Portugal | 4–0 | Lithuania |
|---|---|---|
| Catarina Lopes 10'; Andreia Norton 14'; Nádia Gomes 38'; Vanessa Malho 45' | Report |

Sūduva Stadium, Marijampolė
Attendance: 25
Referee: Irina Turovskaya (Belarus)

23 September 2013
15:00

| Estonia | 0–7 | Portugal |
|---|---|---|
| | Report | Diana Silva 8', 14'; Vanessa Malho 24', 38', 80' (pen.); Catarina Lopes 45+3'; Fátima Pinto 71' |

SRC Alytus, Alytus
Attendance: 20
Referee: Sjoukje de Jong (Netherlands)
23 September 2013
15:00

| Sweden | 10–0 | Lithuania |
|---|---|---|
| Hurtig 16', 19', 29', 63'; Welin 21' (pen.); Karlsson 23'; Blackstenius 34', 47', 61'; Adamavičiūtė 52' (o.g.) | Report |

Darius and Girėnas Stadium, Kaunas
Attendance: 45
Referee: Irina Turovskaya (Belarus)

26 September 2013
15:00

| Portugal | 0–3 | Sweden |
|---|---|---|
| | Report | Blackstenius 41', 85'; Hurtig 83' |

SRC Alytus, Alytus
Attendance: 30
Referee: Sofia Karagiorgi (Cyprus)
26 September 2013
15:00

| Lithuania | 0–1 | Estonia |
|---|---|---|
| | Report | Kubassova 45+2' |

Darius and Girėnas Stadium, Kaunas
Attendance: 25
Referee: Sjoukje de Jong (Netherlands)

=== Group 4 ===
| Pos | Team | Pld | W | D | L | GF | GA | GD | Pts |
|---|---|---|---|---|---|---|---|---|---|
| 1 | Finland (H) | 3 | 3 | 0 | 0 | 9 | 1 | +8 | 9 |
| 2 | Czech Republic | 3 | 2 | 0 | 1 | 11 | 4 | +7 | 6 |
| 3 | Moldova | 3 | 0 | 1 | 2 | 3 | 9 | −6 | 1 |
| 4 | Faroe Islands | 3 | 0 | 1 | 2 | 2 | 11 | −9 | 1 |

(H) Hosts
20 September 2013
11:00

| Czech Republic | 7–0 | Faroe Islands |
|---|---|---|
| Rychtarová 10'; Svitková 19', 36', 56'; Krejčiříková 38'; Hloupá 43'; Kristýnová 55' | Report |

Keskusurheilupuisto, Pargas
Attendance: 178
Referee: Sabine Bonnin (France)
21 September 2013
14:00

| Finland | 4–0 | Moldova |
|---|---|---|
| Seppelin 10'; Saastamoinen 22', 29'; Kuikka 40' | Report |

Keskusliikuntapuisto, Kaarina
Attendance: 343
Referee: Vivian Peeters (Netherlands)

22 September 2013
14:00

| Czech Republic | 3–1 | Moldova |
|---|---|---|
| Tauberová 53'; Krejčiříková 59'; Bužková 63' | Report | Cerescu 72' |

Keskusliikuntapuisto, Kaarina
Attendance: 85
Referee: Vivian Peeters (Netherlands)
23 September 2013
14:00

| Faroe Islands | 0–2 | Finland |
|---|---|---|
| | Report | Saastamoinen 29'; Grönholm 84' |

Veritas Stadion, Turku
Attendance: 432
Referee: Dimitrina Milkova (Bulgaria)

26 September 2013
14:00

| Finland | 3–1 | Czech Republic |
|---|---|---|
| Tunturi 36'; Nevalampi 43'; Saastamoinen 44' | Report | Svitková 60' |

Keskusurheilupuisto, Pargas
Attendance: 735
Referee: Sabine Bonnin (France)
26 September 2013
14:00

| Moldova | 2–2 | Faroe Islands |
|---|---|---|
| Cerescu 45'; Chiper 90+2' | Report | Thomsen 35'; Klakstein 74' (pen.) |

Keskusliikuntapuisto, Kaarina
Attendance: 52
Referee: Dimitrina Milkova (Bulgaria)

=== Group 5 ===
| Pos | Team | Pld | W | D | L | GF | GA | GD | Pts |
|---|---|---|---|---|---|---|---|---|---|
| 1 | Russia | 3 | 3 | 0 | 0 | 13 | 1 | +12 | 9 |
| 2 | Belarus (H) | 3 | 2 | 0 | 1 | 5 | 3 | +2 | 6 |
| 3 | Wales | 3 | 0 | 1 | 2 | 1 | 7 | −6 | 1 |
| 4 | Cyprus | 3 | 0 | 1 | 2 | 4 | 12 | −8 | 1 |

(H) Hosts
21 September 2013
15:00

| Russia | 7–1 | Cyprus |
|---|---|---|
| Chernomyrdina 43', 49', 69'; Piskunova 72', 90+3'; Kovalenko 77', 85' | Report | Zampa 45+4' |

City Stadium, Molodechno
Attendance: 350
Referee: Lilach Asulin (Israel)
21 September 2013
15:00

| Wales | 0–1 | Belarus |
|---|---|---|
| | Report | Quayle 17' (o.g.) |

Torpedo Stadium, Minsk
Attendance: 150
Referee: Justyna Zajac (Poland)

26 September 2013
15:00

| Russia | 1–0 | Belarus |
|---|---|---|
| Piskunova 16' | Report |

Torpedo Stadium, Minsk
Attendance: 200
Referee: Justyna Zajac (Poland)
23 September 2013
15:00

| Cyprus | 1–1 | Wales |
|---|---|---|
| Zampa 32' | Report | Quayle 54' |

City Stadium, Molodechno
Attendance: 200
Referee: Vesna Budimir (Croatia)

26 September 2013
15:00

| Wales | 0–5 | Russia |
|---|---|---|
| | Report | Piskunova 34'; Karpova 57', 82'; Chernomyrdina 81'; Berezina 90+5' |

City Stadium, Molodechno
Attendance: 150
Referee: Lilach Asulin (Israel)
26 September 2013
15:00

| Belarus | 4–2 | Cyprus |
|---|---|---|
| Krasnova 17'; Violari 45+3' (o.g.); Dubovik 49'; Duben 81' | Report | Zampa 67', 70' |

Torpedo Stadium, Minsk
Attendance: 250
Referee: Vesna Budimir (Croatia)

=== Group 6 ===
| Pos | Team | Pld | W | D | L | GF | GA | GD | Pts |
|---|---|---|---|---|---|---|---|---|---|
| 1 | Netherlands | 3 | 3 | 0 | 0 | 8 | 0 | +8 | 9 |
| 2 | Serbia (H) | 3 | 1 | 1 | 1 | 4 | 6 | −2 | 4 |
| 3 | Bosnia and Herzegovina | 3 | 1 | 0 | 2 | 5 | 4 | +1 | 3 |
| 4 | Malta | 3 | 0 | 1 | 2 | 2 | 9 | −7 | 1 |

(H) Hosts
21 September 2013
15:00

| Netherlands | 2–0 | Bosnia and Herzegovina |
|---|---|---|
| Huls 20', 70' | Report |

Gradski Stadion, Indjija
Attendance: 80
Referee: Yuliya Medvedeva-Keldyusheva (Kazakhstan)
21 September 2013
15:00

| Serbia | 2–2 | Malta |
|---|---|---|
| Jankov 56'; Matić 58' | Report | Giusti 85'; Borg 89' |

FK Srem, Jakovo
Attendance: 50
Referee: Kateryna Zora (Ukraine)

23 September 2013
15:00

| Netherlands | 3–0 | Malta |
|---|---|---|
| Strik 34'; Roord 87' van der Zanden 90+1' | Report |

FK Srem, Jakovo
Attendance: 70
Referee: Kateryna Zora (Ukraine)
23 September 2013
15:00

| Bosnia and Herzegovina | 1–2 | Serbia |
|---|---|---|
| Radeljić 39' | Report | Djordjević 19'; Kuliš 33' (o.g.) |

FK Obilić Stadium, Belgrade
Attendance: 50
Referee: Kristina Husballe (Denmark)

26 September 2013
15:00

| Serbia | 0–3 | Netherlands |
|---|---|---|
| | Report | Kuijpers 10', 15', 84' |

FK Obilić Stadium, Belgrade
Attendance: 70
Referee: Yuliya Medvedeva-Keldyusheva (Kazakhstan)
26 September 2013
15:00

| Malta | 0–4 | Bosnia and Herzegovina |
|---|---|---|
| | Report | Brkić 23', 37'; Kamerić 51'; Radeljić 85' |

FK Srem, Jakovo
Attendance: 50
Referee: Kristina Husballe (Denmark)

=== Group 7 ===
| Pos | Team | Pld | W | D | L | GF | GA | GD | Pts |
|---|---|---|---|---|---|---|---|---|---|
| 1 | Poland | 3 | 2 | 1 | 0 | 13 | 0 | +13 | 7 |
| 2 | Italy | 3 | 1 | 2 | 0 | 6 | 2 | +4 | 5 |
| 3 | Slovenia (H) | 3 | 1 | 1 | 1 | 9 | 6 | +3 | 4 |
| 4 | Albania | 3 | 0 | 0 | 3 | 0 | 20 | −20 | 0 |

(H) Hosts
21 September 2013
16:00

| Italy | 2–2 | Slovenia |
|---|---|---|
| Pittaccio 22', 76' | Report | Kos 52' (pen.); Šiljak 71' |

NK Odranci, Odranci
Attendance: 60
Referee: Marte Sørø (Norway)
21 September 2013
16:00

| Poland | 9–0 | Albania |
|---|---|---|
| Wiankowska 5', 90+1', 90+3'; Zapała 12'; Kaletka 17'; Wróblewska 24'; Bolko 29'; Jaszek 83', 89' | Report |

Sports Park, Beltinci
Attendance: 10
Referee: Sabayel Gurbanova (Azerbaijan)

23 September 2013
16:00

| Italy | 4–0 | Albania |
|---|---|---|
| Cannone 24'; Ferrati 65'; Tardini 73'; Monterubbiano 82' | Report |

NK Odranci, Odranci
Attendance: 10
Referee: Sabayel Gurbanova (Azerbaijan)
23 September 2013
16:00

| Slovenia | 0–4 | Poland |
|---|---|---|
| | Report | Pajor 18', 57', 90+1'; Kos 83' (o.g.) |

Sports Park, Beltinci
Attendance: 240
Referee: Marta Frías (Spain)

26 September 2013
16:00

| Poland | 0–0 | Italy |
|---|---|---|
| | Report |

Sports Park, Beltinci
Attendance: 50
Referee: Marte Sørø (Norway)
26 September 2013
16:00

| Albania | 0–7 | Slovenia |
|---|---|---|
| | Report | Sevšek 16'; Misja 33', 39'; Kos 45+1', 50'; Kos 62', 81' |

NK Odranci, Odranci
Attendance: 10
Referee: Marta Frías (Spain)

=== Group 8 ===
| Pos | Team | Pld | W | D | L | GF | GA | GD | Pts |
|---|---|---|---|---|---|---|---|---|---|
| 1 | Scotland | 3 | 3 | 0 | 0 | 29 | 1 | +28 | 9 |
| 2 | Romania | 3 | 2 | 0 | 1 | 8 | 11 | −3 | 6 |
| 3 | Macedonia (H) | 3 | 1 | 0 | 2 | 4 | 12 | −8 | 3 |
| 4 | Georgia | 3 | 0 | 0 | 3 | 5 | 22 | −17 | 0 |

(H) Hosts
21 September 2013
15:30

| Scotland | 7–0 | Macedonia |
|---|---|---|
| Graham 32'; Arnot 38'; Arsova 42' (o.g.); Williamson 45+1'; Weir 67', 90+3'; Richardson 78' | Report |

Stadion Mladost, Strumica
Attendance: 100
Referee: Aneliya Sinabova (Bulgaria)
21 September 2013
15:30

| Romania | 5–2 | Georgia |
|---|---|---|
| Deca 20', 45+2', 88'; Gangal 62'; Bistrian 86' | Report | Shengelia 17'; Cheminava 57' |

Stadion Kukuš, Strumica
Attendance: 60
Referee: Virginie Derouaux (Belgium)

23 September 2013
15:30

| Scotland | 14–1 | Georgia |
|---|---|---|
| Ness 10', 16', 17', 23', 35'; Stewart 11', 18', 64', 90+1'; Halliday 29', 82'; Weir 36'; Arnott 49'; Williamson 60' | Report | Basiladze 4' |

Stadion Kukuš, Strumica
Attendance: 35
Referee: Virginie Derouaux (Belgium)
23 September 2013
15:30

| Macedonia | 1–3 | Romania |
|---|---|---|
| Ristovska 75' | Report | Roca 32' (pen.); Deca 58' (pen.), 88' |

Stadion Mladost, Strumica
Attendance: 80
Referee: Tanja Subotic (Slovenia)

26 September 2013
15:30

| Romania | 0–8 | Scotland |
|---|---|---|
| | Report | Brown 17'; Weir 33', 56', 75', 85' (pen.); Ness 50', 90+2'; Arnott 82' |

Stadion Kukuš, Strumica
Attendance: 50
Referee: Aneliya Sinabova (Bulgaria)
26 September 2013
15:30

| Georgia | 2–3 | Macedonia |
|---|---|---|
| Gorgadze 7'; Cheminava 86' | Report | Todorovska 5', 90+2'; Jakovska 90+4' |

Stadion Mladost, Strumica
Attendance: 75
Referee: Tanja Subotic (Slovenia)

=== Group 9 ===
| Pos | Team | Pld | W | D | L | GF | GA | GD | Pts |
|---|---|---|---|---|---|---|---|---|---|
| 1 | France | 3 | 3 | 0 | 0 | 14 | 0 | +14 | 9 |
| 2 | Iceland | 3 | 2 | 0 | 1 | 10 | 3 | +7 | 6 |
| 3 | Slovakia | 3 | 1 | 0 | 2 | 4 | 9 | −5 | 3 |
| 4 | Bulgaria (H) | 3 | 0 | 0 | 3 | 0 | 16 | −16 | 0 |

(H) Hosts
21 September 2013
15:30

| France | 4–0 | Slovakia |
|---|---|---|
| Chaumette 7'; M'Bock Bathy 54'; Toletti 73' (pen.), 87' | Report |

Albena 1, Albena
Attendance: 50
Referee: Gordana Kuzmanović (Serbia)
21 September 2013
15:30

| Iceland | 5–0 | Bulgaria |
|---|---|---|
| Thrastardóttir 3', 58'; Jessen 25'; Zlateva 50' (o.g.); Sigurdardóttir 83' | Report |

Gradski stadion, Kavarna
Attendance: 50
Referee: Cristina Bujor (Romania)

23 September 2013
15:30

| France | 7–0 | Bulgaria |
|---|---|---|
| Cousin 1'; Declercq 25'; Thomas 54'; Gherbi 60'; Léger 68', 75'; Karchouni 70' | Report |

Gradski stadion, Kavarna
Attendance: 50
Referee: Cristina Bujor (Romania)
23 September 2013
15:30

| Slovakia | 0–5 | Iceland |
|---|---|---|
| | Report | Thrastardóttir 1', 52'; Antonsdottir 10'; Gudmundsdóttir 73'; Jensen 89' |

Albena 1, Albena
Attendance: 30
Referee: Evgenia Kaskantiri (Greece)

26 September 2013
14:00

| Iceland | 0–3 | France |
|---|---|---|
| | Report | Toletti 2'; Declercq 12'; Chaumette 28' |

Albena 1, Albena
Attendance: 120
Referee: Gordana Kuzmanović (Serbia)
26 September 2013
14:00

| Bulgaria | 0–4 | Slovakia |
|---|---|---|
| | Report | Čopíková 7'; Kantárska 15', 33'; Vrabcová 90+5' |

Gradski stadion, Kavarna
Attendance: 50
Referee: Evgenia Kaskantiri (Greece)

=== Group 10 ===
| Pos | Team | Pld | W | D | L | GF | GA | GD | Pts |
|---|---|---|---|---|---|---|---|---|---|
| 1 | Belgium | 3 | 3 | 0 | 0 | 13 | 2 | +11 | 9 |
| 2 | Turkey | 3 | 2 | 0 | 1 | 6 | 7 | −1 | 6 |
| 3 | Hungary (H) | 3 | 1 | 0 | 2 | 8 | 9 | −1 | 3 |
| 4 | Montenegro | 3 | 0 | 0 | 3 | 2 | 11 | −9 | 0 |

(H) Hosts
21 September 2013
14:30

| Belgium | 4–0 | Turkey |
|---|---|---|
| Michez 25', 65'; Van Gorp 58', 76' | Report |

Stadion Gyula Grosics, Tatabánya
Attendance: 20
Referee: Sara Persson (Sweden)
21 September 2013
14:30

| Hungary | 4–1 | Montenegro |
|---|---|---|
| Vidovenyecz 12'; Goranović 19' (o.g.); Diószegi 69'; Vicsek 74' | Report | Krivokapić 85' |

Globall Football Park, Telki
Attendance: 70
Referee: Agnieszka Plaskocinska (Poland)

23 September 2013
14:30

| Belgium | 4–0 | Montenegro |
|---|---|---|
| Van Ackere 24', 84', 90+2'; Wajnblum 90+3' | Report |

Stadion Gyula Grosics, Tatabánya
Attendance: 30
Referee: Agnieszka Plaskocinska (Poland)
23 September 2013
14:30

| Turkey | 3–2 | Hungary |
|---|---|---|
| Başkol 25', 50' (pen.); Özkan 73' | Report | Zeller 34', 59' |

Globall Football Park, Telki
Attendance: 100
Referee: Paula Brady (Ireland)

26 September 2013
14:30

| Hungary | 2–5 | Belgium |
|---|---|---|
| Zeller 21'; Diószegi 84' | Report | Leynen 34', 86'; Michez 64' (pen.), 73', 78' |

Globall Football Park, Telki
Attendance: 117
Referee: Sara Persson (Sweden)
26 September 2013
14:30

| Montenegro | 1–3 | Turkey |
|---|---|---|
| Djukić 90+1' | Report | Topçu 34', 50'; Goranović 82' (o.g.) |

Stadion Gyula Grosics, Tatabánya
Referee: Paula Brady (Republic of Ireland)

=== Group 11 ===
| Pos | Team | Pld | W | D | L | GF | GA | GD | Pts |
|---|---|---|---|---|---|---|---|---|---|
| 1 | Switzerland | 3 | 3 | 0 | 0 | 13 | 1 | +12 | 9 |
| 2 | Ukraine | 3 | 2 | 0 | 1 | 5 | 3 | +2 | 6 |
| 3 | Northern Ireland | 3 | 1 | 0 | 2 | 6 | 6 | 0 | 3 |
| 4 | Latvia (H) | 3 | 0 | 0 | 3 | 1 | 15 | −14 | 0 |

(H) Hosts
21 September 2013
12:00

| Ukraine | 3–0 | Latvia |
|---|---|---|
| Kozyrenko 40', 47'; Korsun 68' | Report |

Stadions Arkādija, Riga
Attendance: 75
Referee: Mihaela Gurdon Basimamović (Croatia)
21 September 2013
18:00

| Switzerland | 3–1 | Northern Ireland |
|---|---|---|
| Müller 28'; Thürig 48'; Calo 67' | Report | Feehan 76' |

Stadions Arkādija, Riga
Attendance: 50
Referee: Ana Jovanović (Serbia)

23 September 2013
12:00

| Northern Ireland | 1–2 | Ukraine |
|---|---|---|
| Feehan 20' (pen.) | Report | Kozyrenko 19'; Malakhova 73' |

Stadions Arkādija, Riga
Attendance: 24
Referee: Ana Jovanović (Serbia)
23 September 2013
18:00

| Switzerland | 8–0 | Latvia |
|---|---|---|
| Brütsch 15'; Calo 21', 67'; Thürig 25'; Ribeaud 33'; Selimi 53'; Ismaili 69'; Müller 90+2' | Report |

Stadions Arkādija, Riga
Attendance: 30
Referee: Zuzana Strpkova (Slovakia)

26 September 2013
15:00

| Ukraine | 0–2 | Switzerland |
|---|---|---|
| | Report | Mauron 19'; Ribeaud 58' |

Ogres pilsētas stadions, Ogre
Attendance: 20
Referee: Mihaela Gurdon Basimamović (Croatia)
26 September 2013
15:00

| Latvia | 1–4 | Northern Ireland |
|---|---|---|
| Fedotova 90' | Report | Rafferty 15'; Šilova 36' (o.g.); McGivern 47'; Feehan 78' |

Stadions Arkādija, Riga
Attendance: 101
Referee: Zuzana Strpkova (Slovakia)

=== Ranking of second-placed teams ===
To determine the ten best second-placed teams from the qualifying round, only the results of the second-placed teams against the winners and the third-placed in each group are taken into account.

The following criteria are applied to determine the rankings:

1. higher number of points obtained in these matches
2. superior goal difference from these matches
3. higher number of goals scored in these matches
4. fair play conduct of the teams in all group matches in the second qualifying round
5. drawing of lots

| Pos | Grp | Team | Pld | W | D | L | GF | GA | GD | Pts |
|---|---|---|---|---|---|---|---|---|---|---|
| 1 | 2 | Republic of Ireland | 2 | 1 | 1 | 0 | 5 | 3 | +2 | 4 |
| 2 | 3 | Portugal | 2 | 1 | 0 | 1 | 7 | 3 | +4 | 3 |
| 3 | 9 | Iceland | 2 | 1 | 0 | 1 | 5 | 3 | +2 | 3 |
| 4 | 4 | Czech Republic | 2 | 1 | 0 | 1 | 4 | 4 | 0 | 3 |
| 5 | 5 | Belarus | 2 | 1 | 0 | 1 | 1 | 1 | 0 | 3 |
| 6 | 11 | Ukraine | 2 | 1 | 0 | 1 | 2 | 3 | −1 | 3 |
| 7 | 6 | Serbia | 2 | 1 | 0 | 1 | 2 | 4 | −2 | 3 |
| 8 | 1 | Croatia | 2 | 1 | 0 | 1 | 3 | 6 | −3 | 3 |
| 9 | 10 | Turkey | 2 | 1 | 0 | 1 | 3 | 6 | −3 | 3 |
| 10 | 8 | Romania | 2 | 1 | 0 | 1 | 3 | 9 | −6 | 3 |
| 11 | 7 | Italy | 2 | 0 | 2 | 0 | 2 | 2 | 0 | 2 |

== Elite round ==
England, Spain and Germany received byes to the second round as the sides with the highest coefficients. Defending champions France were narrowly eliminated in the second round.

=== Format ===
24 team are drawn into six groups of four. The teams then play each other once. After that the group winners and the best runner-up advance to the final tournament.

The draw was held on 20 November 2013 in Nyon. Teams were seeded based on their first round performances. The hosts of the six mini-tournament groups are indicated below in italics.

| Pot A | Pot B | Pot C | Pot D |
|---|---|---|---|
| Germany; England; Spain; Scotland; Sweden; Austria | France; Switzerland; Russia; Belgium; Finland; Netherlands | Denmark; Poland; Republic of Ireland; Portugal; Czech Republic; Iceland | Croatia; Ukraine; Belarus; Turkey; Romania; Serbia |

=== Tiebreakers ===
Tie-breakers between teams with the same number of points are:

1. Higher number of points obtained in the matches played between the teams in question
2. Superior goal difference resulting from the matches played between the teams in question
3. Higher number of goals scored in the matches played between the teams in question

If now two teams still are tied, reapply tie-breakers 1–3, if this does not break the tie, go on.

1. Superior goal difference in all group matches
2. Higher number of goals scored in all group matches
3. Drawing of lots

=== Group 1 ===
| Pos | Team | Pld | W | D | L | GF | GA | GD | Pts |
|---|---|---|---|---|---|---|---|---|---|
| 1 | Spain | 3 | 3 | 0 | 0 | 13 | 0 | +13 | 9 |
| 2 | Switzerland | 3 | 2 | 0 | 1 | 7 | 2 | +5 | 6 |
| 3 | Portugal (H) | 3 | 1 | 0 | 2 | 11 | 4 | +7 | 3 |
| 4 | Belarus | 3 | 0 | 0 | 3 | 0 | 25 | −25 | 0 |

(H) Hosts
5 April 2014
15:00

| Switzerland | 5–0 | Belarus |
|---|---|---|
| Stierli 6', 13'; Brütsch 51'; Stapelfeldt 65'; Ismaili 90' | Report |

Estádio Municipal de Nazaré, Nazaré
Referee: Eszter Urbán (Hungary)
5 April 2014
17:00

| Spain | 2–0 | Portugal |
|---|---|---|
| Esteban 72' (pen.); Turmo 86' | Report |

Estádio Municipal da Marinha Grande, Marinha Grande
Referee: Ivana Vlaić (Bosnia and Herzegovina)

7 April 2014
15:00

| Spain | 10–0 | Belarus |
|---|---|---|
| Caldentey 3', 42', 51', 62'; Alba Pomares 14'; Beshten 16' (o.g.); Esteban 21', pen.' María Díaz 47'; Vasilyeva 50' (o.g.); Sheila Guijarro 90+1' | Report |

Complexo Desportivo das Caldas Da Rainha, Caldas da Rainha
Referee: Graziella Pirriatore (Italia)
7 April 2014
17:00

| Portugal | 1–2 | Switzerland |
|---|---|---|
| Nádia Gomes 81' | Report | Zehnder 36'; Calo 60' (pen.) |

Estádio Municipal de Nazaré, Nazaré
Referee: Ivana Vlaić (Bosnia and Herzegovina)

10 April 2014
17:00

| Switzerland | 0–1 | Spain |
|---|---|---|
| | Report | Marta Turmo 45' |

Estádio Municipal da Marinha Grande, Marinha Grande
Referee: Eszter Urbán (Hungary)
10 April 2014
17:00

| Belarus | 0–10 | Portugal |
|---|---|---|
| | Report | Vanessa Malho 7' (pen.), 48', 66', 89'; Fátima Pinto 34'; Andreia Norton 52', 72'; Ana Capeta 75'; Diana Silva 78', 90+2' |

Complexo Desportivo das Caldas Da Rainha, Caldas da Rainha
Referee: Graziella Pirriatore (Italia)

=== Group 2 ===
| Pos | Team | Pld | W | D | L | GF | GA | GD | Pts |
|---|---|---|---|---|---|---|---|---|---|
| 1 | Scotland | 3 | 3 | 0 | 0 | 9 | 1 | +8 | 9 |
| 2 | Russia | 3 | 1 | 1 | 1 | 4 | 4 | 0 | 4 |
| 3 | Croatia (H) | 3 | 0 | 2 | 1 | 1 | 3 | −2 | 2 |
| 4 | Iceland | 3 | 0 | 1 | 2 | 4 | 10 | −6 | 1 |

(H) Hosts
5 April 2014
15:30

| Scotland | 5–1 | Iceland |
|---|---|---|
| Graham 2', 23'; Ness 11'; Grant 69'; Weir 73' | Report | Gudmundsdóttir 45' |

Stadion Radnik, Velika Gorica
Referee: Zuzana Štrpková (Slovakia)
5 April 2014
15:30

| Russia | 0–0 | Croatia |
|---|---|---|
| | Report |

Stadion Lučko, Zagreb
Referee: Kristina Husballe (Denmark)

7 April 2014
15:30

| Scotland | 2–0 | Croatia |
|---|---|---|
| Stewart 42'; Turner 74' | Report |

Stadion NŠC Stjepan Spajić, Zagreb
Referee: Lina Lehtovaara (Finland)
7 April 2014
15:30

| Iceland | 2–4 | Russia |
|---|---|---|
| Jensen 80'; Thrastardóttir 90+1' | Report | Chernomyrdina 19', 27', 54' (pen.); Berezina 39' |

Stadion Sv. Josip Radnik, Sesvete
Referee: Kristina Husballe (Denmark)

10 April 2014
14:00

| Russia | 0–2 | Scotland |
|---|---|---|
| | Report | Berezina 25' (o.g.); Weir 35' |

Stadion Lučko, Zagreb
Referee: Zuzana Štrpková (Slovakia)
10 April 2014
14:00

| Croatia | 1–1 | Iceland |
|---|---|---|
| Stanić 34' | Report | Thrastardóttir 71' |

Stadion Sv. Josip Radnik, Sesvete
Referee: Lina Lehtovaara (Finland)

=== Group 3 ===
| Pos | Team | Pld | W | D | L | GF | GA | GD | Pts |
|---|---|---|---|---|---|---|---|---|---|
| 1 | Sweden | 3 | 3 | 0 | 0 | 4 | 1 | +3 | 9 |
| 2 | France (H) | 3 | 1 | 1 | 1 | 7 | 4 | +3 | 4 |
| 3 | Romania | 3 | 1 | 0 | 2 | 4 | 7 | −3 | 3 |
| 4 | Poland | 3 | 0 | 1 | 2 | 4 | 8 | −4 | 1 |

(H) Hosts
5 April 2014
16:00

| France | 5–1 | Romania |
|---|---|---|
| Brun 17'; Diani 41'; Sarr 45+1'; Toletti 49', 57' | Report | Obreja 90' |

Stade Firmin Daudou, Trelissac
Referee: Ana Minić (Serbia)
5 April 2014
18:00

| Sweden | 2–1 | Poland |
|---|---|---|
| Curmark 4'; Hurtig 88' | Report | Zapała 25' |

Plaine de jeux de la Canéda, Sarlat-la-Canéda
Referee: Barbara Bollenberg (Austria)

7 April 2014
17:30

| Sweden | 1–0 | Romania |
|---|---|---|
| Hurtig 68' | Report |

Stade Municipal de Camp Réal, Bergerac
Referee: Paula Brady (Ireland)
7 April 2014
18:00

| Poland | 2–2 | France |
|---|---|---|
| Pajor 15', 40' | Report | Sarr 87'; Diani 89' |

Plaine de jeux de la Canéda, Sarlat-la-Canéda
Referee: Barbara Bollenberg (Austria)

10 April 2014
18:30

| France | 0–1 | Sweden |
|---|---|---|
| | Report | Blackstenius 88' |

Stade Firmin Daudou, Trelissac
Referee: Ana Minić (Serbia)
10 April 2014
18:30

| Romania | 3–1 | Poland |
|---|---|---|
| Lunca 5', 84'; Ciolacu 35' | Report | Szaj 11' |

Stade Municipal de Camp Réal, Bergerac
Referee: Paula Brady (Ireland)

=== Group 4 ===
| Pos | Team | Pld | W | D | L | GF | GA | GD | Pts |
|---|---|---|---|---|---|---|---|---|---|
| 1 | Belgium (H) | 3 | 3 | 0 | 0 | 6 | 2 | +4 | 9 |
| 2 | Germany | 3 | 2 | 0 | 1 | 11 | 2 | +9 | 6 |
| 3 | Czech Republic | 3 | 1 | 0 | 2 | 6 | 7 | −1 | 3 |
| 4 | Ukraine | 3 | 0 | 0 | 3 | 2 | 14 | −12 | 0 |

(H) Hosts
5 April 2014
14:00

| Belgium | 3–1 | Ukraine |
|---|---|---|
| Olkhovska 48' (o.g.); Wajnblum 81'; Van Gorp 90+1' | Report | Andrukhiv 38' |

King Baudouin Stadium, Brussels
Referee: Florence Guillemin (France)
5 April 2014
16:00

| Germany | 4–1 | Czech Republic |
|---|---|---|
| Junge 7'; Gier 32'; Becker 34'; Lagaris 88' | Report | Svitková 4' |

Edmond Machtens Stadium, Brussels
Referee: Justyna Zajac (Poland)

7 April 2014
14:00

| Czech Republic | 1–2 | Belgium |
|---|---|---|
| Hloupá 10' | Report | Michez 56'; De Caigny 68' |

King Baudouin Stadium, Brussels
Referee: Lorraine Clark (Scotland)
7 April 2014
16:00

| Germany | 7–0 | Ukraine |
|---|---|---|
| Gier 8', 30'; Giraud 17', 90+1'; Meister 69'; Schermuly 73'; Gaugigl 85' | Report |

Edmond Machtens Stadium, Brussels
Referee: Justyna Zajac (Poland)

10 April 2014
11:00

| Belgium | 1–0 | Germany |
|---|---|---|
| Van Den Bergh 84' | Report |

King Baudouin Stadium, Brussels
Referee: Florence Guillemin (France)
10 April 2014
11:00

| Ukraine | 1–4 | Czech Republic |
|---|---|---|
| Andrukhiv 10' | Report | Krejčiříková 19', 28'; Szewieczková 55'; Demyanyuk 79' (o.g.) |

Stade Joseph Marien, Brussels
Referee: Lorraine Clark (Scotland)

=== Group 5 ===
| Pos | Team | Pld | W | D | L | GF | GA | GD | Pts |
|---|---|---|---|---|---|---|---|---|---|
| 1 | Netherlands (H) | 3 | 2 | 1 | 0 | 6 | 1 | +5 | 7 |
| 2 | Republic of Ireland | 3 | 2 | 1 | 0 | 2 | 0 | +2 | 7 |
| 3 | Austria | 3 | 0 | 1 | 2 | 2 | 6 | −4 | 1 |
| 4 | Turkey | 3 | 0 | 1 | 2 | 1 | 4 | −3 | 1 |

(H) Hosts
5 April 2014
16:00

| Austria | 0–1 | Republic of Ireland |
|---|---|---|
| | Report | Shine 49' |

Sportpark DVS '33 Ermelo, Ermelo
Referee: Sara Persson (Sweden)
5 April 2014
18:30

| Netherlands | 2–0 | Turkey |
|---|---|---|
| Roord 23' (pen.), 64' | Report |

Sportpark De Strokel, Harderwijk
Referee: Nelli Stepanyan (Armenia)

7 April 2014
17:00

| Austria | 1–1 | Turkey |
|---|---|---|
| Billa 17' | Report | Sivrikaya 59' |

Sportpark De Strokel, Harderwijk
Referee: Tanja Subotič (Slovenia)
7 April 2014
19:30

| Republic of Ireland | 0–0 | Netherlands |
|---|---|---|
| | Report |

Sportpark DVS '33 Ermelo, Ermelo
Referee: Nelli Stepanyan (Armenia)

10 April 2014
19:00

| Netherlands | 4–1 | Austria |
|---|---|---|
| Roord 4', 44'; Kuijpers 79', 86' | Report | Billa 36' |

Sportpark DVS '33 Ermelo, Ermelo
Referee: Sara Persson (Sweden)
10 April 2014
19:00

| Turkey | 0–1 | Republic of Ireland |
|---|---|---|
| | Report | Rowe 36' |

Sportpark De Strokel, Harderwijk
Referee: Tanja Subotič (Slovenia)

=== Group 6 ===
| Pos | Team | Pld | W | D | L | GF | GA | GD | Pts |
|---|---|---|---|---|---|---|---|---|---|
| 1 | England | 3 | 3 | 0 | 0 | 8 | 0 | +8 | 9 |
| 2 | Finland (H) | 3 | 1 | 1 | 1 | 6 | 7 | −1 | 4 |
| 3 | Serbia | 3 | 1 | 0 | 2 | 1 | 6 | −5 | 3 |
| 4 | Denmark | 3 | 0 | 1 | 2 | 2 | 4 | −2 | 1 |

(H) Hosts
5 April 2014
11:00

| England | 1–0 | Denmark |
|---|---|---|
| Williamson 62' | Report |

ISS Stadion, Vantaa
Referee: Karolina Radzik-Johan (Poland)
5 April 2014
16:00

| Finland | 4–0 | Serbia |
|---|---|---|
| Saastamoinen 38', 74'; Franssi 42', 70' | Report |

Sonera Stadium, Helsinki
Referee: Melis Özçiğdem (Turkey)

7 April 2014
11:00

| England | 2–0 | Serbia |
|---|---|---|
| Flint 67'; Ayane 90+2' | Report |

Sonera Stadium, Helsinki
Referee: Irina Turovskaya (Belarus)
7 April 2014
16:00

| Denmark | 2–2 | Finland |
|---|---|---|
| Thøgersen 52'; Hansen 55' | Report | Tunturi 16'; Saastamoinen 85' |

Sonera Stadium, Helsinki
Referee: Melis Özçiğdem (Turkey)

10 April 2014
11:00

| Finland | 0–5 | England |
|---|---|---|
| | Report | Zelem 8', 85'; Flint 14'; Mead 33', 79' |

Sonera Stadium, Helsinki
Referee: Karolina Radzik-Johan (Poland)
10 April 2014
11:00

| Serbia | 1–0 | Denmark |
|---|---|---|
| Delić 80' | Report |

Sonera Stadium, Helsinki
Referee: Irina Turovskaya (Belarus)

=== Ranking of second-placed teams ===
To determine the best second-placed team from the qualifying round, only the results of the second-placed teams against the winners and the third-placed in each group are taken into account.

The following criteria are applied to determine the rankings:

1. higher number of points obtained in these matches
2. superior goal difference from these matches
3. higher number of goals scored in these matches
4. fair play conduct of the teams in all group matches in the second qualifying round
5. drawing of lots

Ireland advanced as best runners-up to the final tournament. Defending champions France and top seeded Germany were eliminated in this stage.

| Pos | Grp | Team | Pld | W | D | L | GF | GA | GD | Pts |
|---|---|---|---|---|---|---|---|---|---|---|
| 1 | 5 | Republic of Ireland | 2 | 1 | 1 | 0 | 1 | 0 | +1 | 4 |
| 2 | 3 | France | 2 | 1 | 0 | 1 | 5 | 2 | +3 | 3 |
| 3 | 4 | Germany | 2 | 1 | 0 | 1 | 4 | 2 | +2 | 3 |
| 4 | 1 | Switzerland | 2 | 1 | 0 | 1 | 2 | 2 | 0 | 3 |
| 5 | 6 | Finland | 2 | 1 | 0 | 1 | 4 | 5 | −1 | 3 |
| 6 | 2 | Russia | 2 | 0 | 1 | 1 | 0 | 2 | −2 | 1 |
