= 2013 UEFA Women's Under-19 Championship second qualifying round =

Football tournament qualification stage

2013 UEFA Women's Under-19 Championship Second Qualifying Round was the first round of qualifications for the Final Tournament of 2013 UEFA Women's Under-19 Championship, which will be held in Wales. The first matches were played on 4 April 2013.

England, France and Germany received byes to the second round as the sides with the highest coefficients.

== Format ==
24 team are drawn into six groups of four. The teams then play each other once. After that the group winners and the best runner-up advance to the final tournament.

== Seedings ==
The draw was held on 20 November 2012 in Nyon. Teams are seeded based on their first round performances. In the draw one team per pot will be drawn together. No team can meet a team they played in the first qualifying round.

Pot A	Pot B	Pot C	Pot D
Germany; France; England; Finland; Denmark; Republic of Ireland	Switzerland; Northern Ireland; Norway; Sweden; Czech Republic; Ukraine	Italy; Belgium; Portugal; Serbia; Spain; Scotland	Iceland; Hungary; Austria; Netherlands; Russia; Greece

The hosts of the four one-venue mini-tournament groups are indicated below in italics.

== Tiebreakers ==
Tie-breakers between teams with the same number of points are:

1. Higher number of points obtained in the matches played between the teams in question
2. Superior goal difference resulting from the matches played between the teams in question
3. Higher number of goals scored in the matches played between the teams in question

If now two teams still are tied, reapply tie-breakers 1-3, if this does not break the tie, go on.

1. Superior goal difference in all group matches
2. Higher number of goals scored in all group matches
3. Drawing of lots

== Group 1 ==
Group 1 was played in the Netherlands.

Team	Pld	W	D	L	GF	GA	GD	Pts
Sweden	3	2	1	0	5	2	+3	7
Republic of Ireland	3	2	0	1	3	3	0	6
Netherlands	3	1	0	2	3	3	0	3
Italy	3	0	1	2	2	5	−3	1

4 April 2013
16:30

Republic of Ireland	1 – 0	Italy
Jarrett 42'	Report

Sportpark Tanthof-Zuid, Delft
Referee: Sandra Bastos (Portugal)
4 April 2013
18:30

Sweden	1 – 0	Netherlands
Hammarlund 39'	Report

Sportpark Juliana, 's-Gravenzande
Referee: Eleni Lampadariou (Greece)

6 April 2013
15:30

Italy	2 – 2	Sweden
Giacinti 57'; Wahlberg 69' (o.g.)	Report	Banušić 10', 74' (pen.)

Sportpark Juliana, 's-Gravenzande
Referee: Sabina Valieva (Russia)
6 April 2013
15:30

Republic of Ireland	2 – 1	Netherlands
Shine 22'; McCabe 25'	Report	Moorrees 68'

Sportpark Tanthof-Zuid, Delft
Referee: Eleni Lampadariou, Greece

9 April 2013
17:00

Sweden	2 – 0	Republic of Ireland
Banušić 69'; Hammarlund 84'	Report

Sportpark Tanthof-Zuid, Delft
9 April 2013
17:00

Netherlands	2 – 0	Italy
Westervelt 14'; Miedema 48'	Report

Sportpark Juliana, 's-Gravenzande

== Group 2 ==
Group 2 was played in Belgium.

Team	Pld	W	D	L	GF	GA	GD	Pts
France	3	3	0	0	11	1	+10	9
Belgium	3	2	0	1	3	2	+1	6
Switzerland	3	1	0	2	4	5	−1	3
Russia	3	0	0	3	1	11	−10	0

4 April 2013
16:00

Switzerland	4 – 0	Russia
Ismalli 35'; Thürig 59'; Deplazes 90', 90+2'	Report

US Center, La Louviere
Referee: Eszter Urban (Hungary)
4 April 2013
19:00

France	2 – 0	Belgium
Dafeur 61'; Diani 88'	Report

Le Tivoli, La Louviere
Referee: Rhona Daly (Republic of Ireland)

6 April 2013
15:30

Belgium	2 – 0	Switzerland
Wajnblum 45+3'; Blom 62'	Report

Le Tivoli, La Louviere
Referee: Riem Hussein (Germany)
6 April 2013
17:00

France	6 – 1	Russia
Declercq 3'; Diani 33'; Levogez 41', 83', 90+3' (pen.); Karchouni 55'	Report	Kovalenko 66' (pen.)

US Center, La Louviere
Referee: Eszter Urban (Hungary)

9 April 2013
17:00

Switzerland	0 – 3	France
		Gagnet 37'; Diani 54'; Declercq 61'

US Center, La Louviere
9 April 2013
17:00

Russia	0 – 1	Belgium
		Vanhamel 88'

Le Tivoli, La Louviere

== Group 3 ==
Group 3 was played in the Scotland.

Team	Pld	W	D	L	GF	GA	GD	Pts
Denmark	3	3	0	0	6	1	+5	9
Scotland	3	2	0	1	8	3	+5	6
Ukraine	3	0	1	2	2	7	−5	1
Austria	3	0	1	2	1	6	−5	1

4 April 2013
20:00

Denmark	1 – 0	Scotland
Thestrup 43'	Report

Almondvale Stadium, Livingston
Referee: Knarik Grigoryan (Armenia)
4 April 2013
20:00

Ukraine	0 – 0	Austria
	Report

Falkirk Stadium, Falkirk
Referee: Leen Martens, (Belgium)

6 April 2013
12:00

Denmark	2 - 1	Austria
Andersen 22'; Thestrup 85'	Report	Bauer 76'

New Douglas Park, Hamilton
Referee: Leen Martens, Belgium
6 April 2013
17:00

Scotland	4 - 2	Ukraine
Hunter 11'; Emslie 36'; Hill 51'; Weir 77'	Report	Furmnova 16'; Khimich 70'

New Douglas Park, Hamilton
Referee: Esther Azzopardi, Malta

9 April 2013
17:00

Ukraine	0 – 3	Denmark
	Report	Gewitz 28'; Thestrup 63', 67'

Falkirk Stadium, Falkirk
9 April 2013
17:00

Austria	0 – 4	Scotland
	Report	Weir 13', 30'; Ness 18'; Richards 53'

Almondvale Stadium, Livingston

== Group 4 ==
Group 4 was played in Norway. Norway qualified as runners-up with the best record.

Team	Pld	W	D	L	GF	GA	GD	Pts
England	3	2	0	1	10	5	+5	6
Norway	3	2	0	1	12	5	+7	6
Hungary	3	1	0	2	4	13	−9	3
Serbia	3	1	0	2	10	13	−3	3

4 April 2013
14:00

England	4 – 5	Serbia
Lawley 24', 25'; Zelem 69', 87' (pen.)	Report	Čubrilo 5'; Damnjanović 31', 76'; Savanović 38'; Popov 47'

UKI Arena, Jessheim
Referee: Lina Lehtovaara (Finland)
4 April 2013
18:00

Norway	7 – 0	Hungary
Eikeland 6', 77'; Skinnes Hansen 22', 69'; Voltervik 59'; Reiten 71' (pen.); Stenevik 84'	Report

UKI Arena, Jessheim
Referee: Séverine Zinck (France)

6 April 2013
13:00

Serbia	2 - 5	Norway
Savanović 27'; Damnjanović 79'	Report	Voltervik 17', 42'; Thun 35', 48'; Reinås 56'

Gjemselund Stadion, Kongsvinger
Referee: Slavomira Majkuthová, Slovakia
6 April 2013
17:00

England	3 – 0	Hungary
Parris 10'; Sigsworth 36'; Zelem 78'	Report

Gjemselund Stadion, Kongsvinger
Referee: Lina Lehtovaara (Finland)

9 April 2013
17:00

Norway	0 – 3	England
	Report	Zelem 36'; Stewart 65'; Prris 70'

UKI Arena, Jessheim
9 April 2013
17:00

Hungary	4 – 3	Serbia
Nagy 2', 71', 75'; Kaján 68'	Report	Djordjević 15', 54'; Kókány 45+1' (o.g.)

Gjemselund Stadion, Kongsvinger

== Group 5 ==
Group 5 was played in Portugal.

Team	Pld	W	D	L	GF	GA	GD	Pts
Finland	3	3	0	0	8	1	+7	9
Iceland	3	1	1	1	2	2	0	4
Portugal	3	1	0	2	3	3	0	3
Northern Ireland	3	0	1	2	1	8	−7	1

4 April 2013
17:00

Northern Ireland	1 – 1	Iceland
Magill 64' (pen.)	Report	Thrastardóttir 27'

Municipal Sergio Conceicao, Coimbra
Referee: Olga Zadinová (Czech Republic)
4 April 2013
17:00

Finland	2 – 1	Portugal
Winter 79'; I. Salmi 86'	Report	Silva 69'

José Bento Pessoa, Figueira de Foz
Referee: Monika Mularczyk (Poland)

6 April 2013
17:00

Finland	1 – 0	Iceland
Engman 50'	Report

Complexo Desportivo da Tocha, Tocha
Referee: Olga Zadinová, Czech Republic
6 April 2013
18:00

Portugal	2 – 0	Northern Ireland
Vanessa Malho 61'; Diana Silva 63'	Report

Municipal Sergio Conceicao, Coimbra
Referee: Pernilla Larsson, Sweden

9 April 2013
17:00

Northern Ireland	0 – 5	Finland
	Report	Heroum 26', 62'; Engman 30'; Kuikka 73'; Kemppi 78'

9 April 2013
17:00

Iceland	1 – 0	Portugal
Óladóttir 67'	Report

== Group 6 ==
Group 6 was played in Germany.

Team	Pld	W	D	L	GF	GA	GD	Pts
Germany	3	3	0	0	16	1	+15	9
Czech Republic	3	1	0	2	3	7	−4	3
Spain	3	1	0	2	5	6	−1	3
Greece	3	1	0	2	3	13	−10	3

4 April 2013
11:00

Germany	2 – 1	Spain
Magull 2', 62'	Report	Pinel 72'

Waldstadion, Viernheim
Referee: Morag Pirie (Scotland)
4 April 2013
14:00

Czech Republic	2 – 0	Greece
A. Šturmová 37'; Hloupá 47'	Report

Waldstadion, Viernheim
Referee: Lilach Asulin (Israel)

6 April 2013
11:00

Germany	9 – 0	Greece
Dallmann 6'; Panfil 9', 17'; Romert 15'; Magull 19'; Dongus 55', 58', 90+1'; Wilde 62'	Report

Sportzentrum Süd, Heidelberg
Referee: Lilach Asulin (Israel)
6 April 2013
14:00

Spain	2 – 1	Czech Republic
Putellas 74'; Pinel 87'	Report	Krejčiříková 63'

Sportzentrum Süd, Heidelberg
Referee: Marte Sørø (Norway)

9 April 2013
17:00

Czech Republic	0 – 5	Germany
		Magull 13'; Däbritz 30' (pen.); Jäger 43'; Leupolz 90'; Chojnowski 90+3'

FC-Astoria Stadion, Walldorf
Referee: Morag Pirie (Scotland)
9 April 2013
17:00

Greece	3 – 2	Spain
Mitkou 3'; Vardali 27'; Kokoviadou 53' (pen.)		Putellas 12' (pen.); Ortiz 20'

Waldstadion, Viernheim
Referee: Marte Sørø (Norway)

== Ranking of group runners-up ==
In the ranking of the second-place finishers, only the results against the first and third teams count.

Grp	Team	Pld	W	D	L	GF	GA	GD	Pts
4	Norway	2	1	0	1	7	3	+4	3
3	Scotland	2	1	0	1	4	3	+1	3
2	Belgium	2	1	0	1	2	2	0	3
5	Iceland	2	1	0	1	1	1	0	3
1	Republic of Ireland	2	1	0	1	2	3	−1	3
6	Czech Republic	2	0	0	2	1	7	−6	0
