= 2012 UEFA Women's Under-19 Championship =

2012 UEFA 19 Yaş Altı Kadınlar Şampiyonası

Tournament details
- Host country: Turkey
- Dates: 2–14 July
- Teams: 8

Final positions
- Champions: Sweden (2nd title)
- Runners-up: Spain

Tournament statistics
- Matches played: 15
- Goals scored: 26 (1.73 per match)
- Top scorer(s): (Sweden) Elin Rubensson (5 goals)
- Best player: (Sweden) Elin Rubensson

The UEFA Women's U-19 Championship 2012 Final Tournament was held in Antalya, Turkey between 2 and 14 July 2012. Players born after 1 January 1993 were eligible to participate in this competition.

== Tournament structure ==
The regulations make up for the following tournament structure:

	Teams entering in this round	Teams advancing from previous round	Competition format
First qualifying round (40 teams)	40 teams from associations ranked 4–53		10 groups of 4 teams, hosted by one nation, seeded into four pots by UEFA coefficient
Second qualifying round (24 teams)	Germany (ranked 1); France (ranked 2); England (ranked 3)	10 group winners and runners-up from 1st qualifying round; best group third-place finisher from 1st qualifying round	6 groups of 4 teams, hosted by one nation, seeded into four pots by UEFA coefficient
Final tournament (8 teams)	Turkey (hosts)	6 group winners from 2nd qualifying round; best group runners-up from 2nd qualifying round	2 groups of 4 teams, semi-finals, final

== Qualifications ==
There are two separate rounds of qualifications held before the Final Tournament.

=== First qualifying round ===
In the first qualifying round 40 teams were drawn into 10 groups. The top two of each group and the best third-place finisher, counting only matches against the top two in the group, advanced.

=== Second qualifying round ===
In the second round the 21 teams from the first qualifying round were joined by top seeds Germany, France and England . The 24 teams of this round will be drawn into six groups of four teams. The group winners and the runners-up team with the best record against the sides first and third in their group advance to the final tournament. The draw was held at UEFA headquarters on 15 November 2011.

== Final tournament ==
The 7 teams advancing from the second qualifying round will be joined by host nation Turkey. The eight teams will be drawn into two groups of four with the top two teams of each group advancing to the semi-finals. Denmark qualified as best runners-up in the second qualifying round. Germany, having been the only team to participate in all final tournaments so far, missed out on qualification for the first time. The draw took place on 24 April in Antalya, Turkey.

=== Group A ===
Team	Pld	W	D	L	GF	GA	GD	Pts
Denmark	3	3	0	0	3	0	+3	9
Portugal	3	1	1	1	1	1	0	4
Turkey	3	0	2	1	1	2	−1	2
Romania	3	0	1	2	1	3	−2	1

2 July 2012
21:30

Denmark	1–0	Romania
Bovbjerg 90+2'	Report

Titanic Stadium, Antalya
Referee: Knarik Grigoryan (Armenia)

2 July 2012
21:30

Turkey	0–0	Portugal
	Report

Mardan Sports Complex, Antalya
Referee: Anastasia Pustovoitova (Russia)

5 July 2012
19:30

Turkey	0–1	Denmark
	Report	Fisker 50'

Mardan Sports Complex, Antalya
Referee: Simona Ghisletta (Switzerland)

5 July 2012
21:30

Portugal	1–0	Romania
Micas 43'	Report

World of Wonders Football Centre, Antalya
Referee: Zuzana Kováčová (Slovakia)

8 July 2012
21:30

Romania	1–1	Turkey
Bâtea 51'	Report	Corduneanu 78' (o.g.)

Mardan Sports Complex, Antalya
Referee: Riem Hussein (Germany)

8 July 2012
21:30

Portugal	0–1	Denmark
	Report	Andersen 75' (pen.)

World of Wonders Football Centre, Antalya
Referee: Stéphanie Frappart (France)

=== Group B ===
Team	Pld	W	D	L	GF	GA	GD	Pts
Spain	3	2	1	0	7	0	+7	7
Sweden	3	2	1	0	6	1	+5	7
England	3	0	1	2	0	5	−5	1
Serbia	3	0	1	2	1	8	−7	1

2 July 2012
19:30

England	0–1	Sweden
	Report	Rubensson 31' (pen.)

Mardan Sports Complex, Antalya
Referee: Simona Ghisletta (Switzerland)

2 July 2012
21:30

Spain	3–0	Serbia
Pinel 6'; Andrés 71'; Calderón 88'	Report

World of Wonders Football Centre, Antalya
Referee: Zuzana Kováčová (Slovakia)

5 July 2012
21:30

Spain	4–0	England
Putellas 17'; Sampedro 29'; Torrecilla 45', 69'	Report

Titanic Stadium, Antalya
Referee: Stéphanie Frappart (France)

5 July 2012
21:30

Serbia	1–5	Sweden
Marija Ilić 65'	Report	Rubensson 31', 62'; Hammarlund 38'; Djordjević 70' (o.g.); Diaz 90+3'

Mardan Sports Complex, Antalya
Referee: Riem Hussein (Germany)

8 July 2012
19:30

Serbia	0–0	England
	Report

Titanic Stadium, Antalya
Referee: Anastasia Pustovoitova (Russia)

8 July 2012
19:30

Sweden	0–0	Spain
	Report

Mardan Sports Complex, Antalya
Referee: Knarik Grigoryan (Armenia)

== Knockout stage ==
=== Bracket ===
Semi-finals
11 July – Antalya
Denmark	1
Sweden	3
11 July – Antalya
Spain	1
Portugal	0

Final
14 July – Antalya
Sweden (a.e.t.)	1
Spain	0

=== Semifinals ===
11 July 2012
21:00
SF1

Denmark	1–3	Sweden
K S Nielsen 61'	Report	Rubensson 6', 23'; Pedersen 90' (o.g.)

World of Wonders Football Centre, Antalya
Referee: Anastasia Pustovoitova (Russia)
11 July 2012
21:00
SF2

Spain	1–0	Portugal
Pinel 87'	Report

Mardan Sports Complex, Antalya
Referee: Riem Hussein (Germany)

=== Final ===
14 July 2012
21:00

Sweden	1–0 (a.e.t.)	Spain
Diaz 108'	Report

Mardan Sports Complex, Antalya
Referee: Stéphanie Frappart (France)

Sweden	Spain

SWEDEN:
GK	1	Jessica Höglander
MF	3	Amanda Ilestedt (c)
DF	4	Jennie Nordin
DF	5	Magdalena Ericsson
MF	6	Therése Boström	(substituted off) 34'
MF	7	Petra Andersson
FW	8	Malin Diaz
FW	9	Pauline Hammarlund	(substituted off) 104'
FW	10	Elin Rubensson
DF	13	Hanna Glas
MF	16	Lina Hurtig	(substituted off) 113'
Substitutes:
FW	11	Jonna Andersson	(substituted on) 34'
FW	14	Fridolina Rolfö	(substituted on) 104'
MF	15	Julia Wahlberg	(substituted on) 113'
Manager:
Calle Barrling

SPAIN:
GK	1	Dolores Gallardo
DF	2	Idaira Rodríguez
DF	4	Ivana Andrés
DF	5	Andrea Pereira
MF	6	Nagore Calderón
MF	7	Gema Gili		(substituted off) 84'
FW	9	Raquel Pinel		(substituted off) 89'
MF	10	Amanda Sampedro	(yellow card) 83'
MF	11	Alexia Putellas (c)		(substituted off) 83'
DF	17	Raquel Carreño
MF	18	Virginia Torrecilla
Substitutes:
MF	12	Nelly Maestro		(substituted on) 83'
MF	16	Ana Troyano		(substituted on) 84'
MF	8	Marina García		(substituted on) 89'
Manager:
Ángel Vilda

MATCH OFFICIALS

- Assistant referees:
  - Michelle O'Neill (Republic of Ireland)
  - Anne Cheron (Belgium)
- Fourth official: Anastasia Pustovoitova (Russia)

2012 UEFA Women's U-19 European champions

Sweden
Second title

== Statistics ==
=== Goalscorers ===
5 goals

- (Sweden) Elin Rubensson

2 goals

- (Spain) Raquel Pinel
- (Spain) Virginia Torrecilla
- (Sweden) Malin Diaz

1 goal

- (Denmark) Camilla Andersen
- (Denmark) Christina Bovbjerg
- (Denmark) Anna Fisker
- (Denmark) Karoline Smidt Nielsen
- (Portugal) Micas
- (Romania) Mara Bâtea
- (Serbia) Marija Ilić
- (Spain) Ivana Andrés
- (Spain) Nagore Calderón
- (Spain) Alexia Putellas
- (Spain) Amanda Sampedro
- (Sweden) Pauline Hammarlund

Own goals

- (Denmark) Stine Pedersen (playing against Sweden)
- (Romania) Andreea Corduneanu (playing against Turkey)
- (Serbia) Jasna Djordjević (playing against Sweden)
