= Gorgadze =

Gorgadze (Georgian: გორგაძე) is a Georgian surname. Notable people with the surname include:

- Beka Gorgadze (bornl 1996), Georgian rugby union player
- Lana Gorgadze (born 1997), Georgian footballer
- Levan Gorgadze (born 1987), Georgian professional sumo wrestler
