= Petra Andersson =

Swedish football midfielder

Personal information
- Full name: Petra Andersson
- Date of birth: 23 October 1993 (age 33)
- Place of birth: Sweden
- Position: Midfielder

Senior career*
Years	Team	Apps	(Gls)
2009–2015	AIK	106	(2)
2016–2017	Eskilstuna United DFF	38	(1)

International career^{‡}
2010–2012	Sweden U19	11	(0)
- * Club domestic league appearances and goals as of 02:35, 18 May 2016 (UTC) ‡ National team caps and goals as of 02:35, 18 May 2016 (UTC)

Petra Andersson (born 23 October 1993) is a Swedish football midfielder who played for Eskilstuna United DFF.

== Awards and honours ==
Sweden U19

Winner

- UEFA Women's Under-19 Championship: 2012
