= Serbia women's national under-19 football team =

National association football team

Serbia U19
- Association: Football Association of Serbia
- Head coach: (Serbia) Lidija Stojkanović
- FIFA code: SRB
First colours	Second colours

UEFA Women's U-19 Championship
- Appearances: 2 (first in 2012)

The Serbia women's national under-19 football team (Serbian Latin: Omladinska ženska reprezentacija Srbije) is the national under-19 football team of Serbia and is controlled by the Football Association of Serbia.

== Current squad ==
The following players were named in the squad for the 2012 UEFA Women's U-19 Championship in July 2012.

No.	Pos.	Player	Date of birth (age)	Caps	Goals	Club
1	GK	Nevena Stojaković	18 March 1995 (age 31)			(Football Association of Serbia) Mašinac
12	GK	Katarina Vojinović	18 May 1995 (age 31)			(Football Association of Serbia) Lemind Lavice Orion
2	DF	Jasna Đorđević	24 May 1993 (age 33)			(Football Association of Serbia) Mašinac
3	DF	Tijana Krstić	1 April 1995 (age 31)			
5	DF	Ivana Bobić	13 July 1993 (age 33)			
6	DF	Miljana Smiljković	8 August 1994 (age 32)			
13	DF	Ivana Damnjanović	16 April 1994 (age 32)			
15	DF	Ana Lilić	28 September 1993 (age 33)			(Football Association of Serbia) Mašinac
4	MF	Aleksandra Savanović	30 August 1994 (age 32)			(Football Association of Serbia) Spartak
7	MF	Jelena Čanković	13 August 1995 (age 31)			(Football Association of Serbia) Spartak
8	MF	Marija Ilić	3 June 1993 (age 33)			(Football Association of Serbia) Spartak
10	MF	Nevena Damnjanović	12 April 1993 (age 33)			(Football Association of Serbia) Spartak
14	MF	Ana Popov	4 April 1994 (age 32)			(Football Association of Serbia) Crvena zvezda
16	MF	Andrijana Trišić	2 September 1994 (age 32)	2	2	(Football Association of Serbia) Mašinac
9	FW	Andrijana Pešić	18 September 1994 (age 32)			(Football Association of Serbia) LASK Crvena zvezda
11	FW	Jelena Čubrilo	9 January 1994 (age 32)			(Football Association of Serbia) Spartak
17	FW	Mima Stanković	26 June 1994 (age 32)			(Football Association of Serbia) Mašinac
18	FW	Jovana Damnjanović	24 November 1994 (age 31)			(Football Association of Serbia) LASK Crvena zvezda

== Competitive Record ==
=== UEFA European U-19 Championship Record ===
Year	Result	MP	W	D*	L	GS	GA
1998 to 2011	did not qualify						
(Turkey) 2012	Group stage	3	0	1	2	1	8
(Wales) 2013	did not qualify						
(Norway) 2014	did not qualify						
(Israel) 2015	did not qualify						
(Slovakia) 2016	did not qualify						
(Northern Ireland) 2017	did not qualify						
(Switzerland) 2018	did not qualify						
(Scotland) 2019	did not qualify						
(Georgia (country)) ~~2020~~	Cancelled						
(Belarus) ~~2021~~	Cancelled						
(Czech Republic) 2022	did not qualify						
(Belgium) 2023	did not qualify						
(Lithuania) 2024	Group stage	3	1	1	1	6	5
(Poland) 2025	Did not qualify						
(Bosnia and Herzegovina) 2026	Did not qualify						
(Hungary) 2027	TBD						
Total	2/26	6	1	2	3	7	13

*Draws include knockout matches decided by penalty shootout.

== See also ==
- Serbia women's national football team
- UEFA Women's U-19 Championship
