= Loreta Kullashi =

Swedish footballer (born 1999)

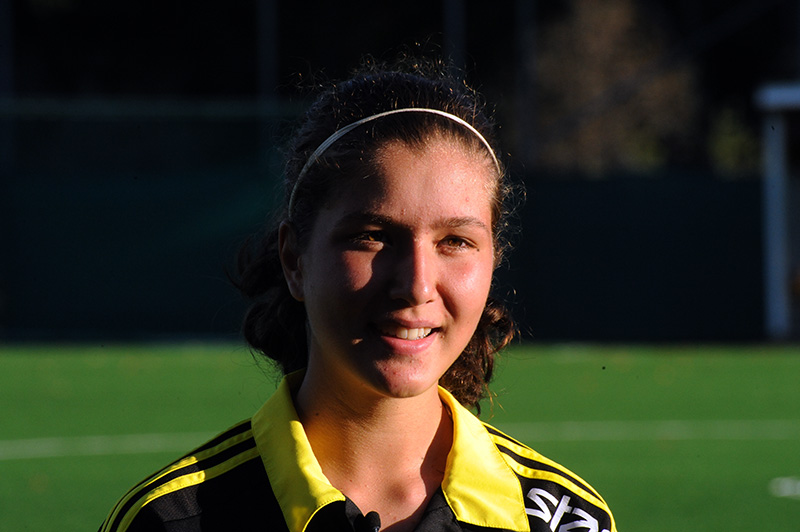
- With AIK in 2015

Personal information
- Full name: Loreta Kullashi
- Date of birth: 20 May 1999 (age 27)
- Place of birth: Helsinki, Finland
- Height: 1.71 m (5 ft 7 in)
- Position: Forward

Team information
- Current team: Badalona
- Number: 14

Youth career
- –2011: Snöstorp Nyhem FF
- 2011–2015: AIK

Senior career*
Years	Team	Apps	(Gls)
2015–2017	AIK	38	(24)
2017–2021	Eskilstuna United	76	(27)
2021–2023	FC Rosengård	47	(12)
2023–2024	→ Sassuolo (loan)	25	(7)
2024	Inter Milan	0	(0)
2025	Napoli	13	(0)
2025–	Badalona	11	(0)

International career
2015	Sweden U17	11	(9)
2016–2018	Sweden U19	19	(8)
2017–2023	Sweden U23	22	(5)
2018–2020	Sweden	8	(3)
- * Club domestic league appearances and goals as of 15:13, 16 December 2025 (UTC)

Loreta Kullashi (born 20 May 1999) is a professional footballer who plays as a forward for Spanish Liga F club Badalona.

She began playing football at Snöstorp Nyhem FF before joining AIK, where she started her senior career. She later played for Eskilstuna United, FC Rosengård, had a loan spell at Sassuolo, and subsequently played for Inter Milan and Napoli before joining Badalona in 2025.

Kullashi represented Sweden across youth levels, including the U17, U19 and U23 teams, before making eight appearances and scoring three goals for the senior Sweden national team between 2018 and 2020. She declared her intention to represent the Kosovo national team in February 2026.

== Club career ==
Kullashi was born in Helsinki, Finland, to Kosovar-Albanian parents. She moved to Sweden from Finland when she was five years old, and she grew up in Halmstad. She started playing organised football with Snöstorp Nyhem FF's youth system and moved to AIK in summer 2011. She made her debut for AIK as a 15-year-old, in a Svenska Cupen quarter-final fixture at Umeå IK on 29 March 2015.

She made six appearances in the 2015 Damallsvenskan for relegated AIK, but was given a more central role the following season. In 2016 she scored 15 goals in 20 Elitettan matches and 20 goals in 23 matches across all competitions. In January 2017 she joined English FA WSL club Manchester City on trial, but ultimately re-signed for AIK in time for the 2017 season. In July 2017 she transferred to Damallsvenskan club Eskilstuna United.

On her debut appearance for Eskilstuna United, Kullashi scored two goals in a 4–0 home win over IF Limhamn Bunkeflo. She was praised by teammate Olivia Schough and her new coach for her dribbling abilities.

== International career ==
Kullashi was the youngest player named to the Sweden squad for the 2016 FIFA U-20 Women's World Cup in Papua New Guinea.

In January 2018, 18-year-old Kullashi enjoyed a "dream" debut for the senior Sweden team, scoring two goals in a 3–0 win over South Africa.

== International goals ==
No.	Date	Venue	Opponent	Score	Result	Competition
1.	21 January 2018	Green Point Stadium, Cape Town, South Africa	South Africa	0–2	0–3	Friendly
2.	21 January 2018	Green Point Stadium, Cape Town, South Africa	South Africa	0–3	0–3	Friendly
3.	4 October 2019	Diósgyőri Stadion, Miskolc, Hungary	Hungary	0–5	0–5	UEFA Women's Euro 2022 qualifying

== Honours ==
Sweden

- Algarve Cup: 2018
