= UEFA Women's Euro 2022 qualifying Group F =

Football tournament qualification stage

Group F of the UEFA Women's Euro 2022 qualifying competition consisted of five teams: Sweden, Iceland, Hungary, Slovakia, and Latvia. The composition of the nine groups in the qualifying group stage was decided by the draw held on 21 February 2019, 13:30 CET (UTC+1), at the UEFA headquarters in Nyon, Switzerland. with the teams seeded according to their coefficient ranking.

The group was played in home-and-away round-robin format between August 2019 and December 2020. The group winners and the three best runners-up among all nine groups (not counting results against the sixth-placed team) qualified directly for the final tournament, while the remaining six runners-up advance to the play-offs.

On 17 March 2020, all matches were put on hold due to the COVID-19 pandemic.

== Standings ==
Pos	Team	Pld	W	D	L	GF	GA	GD	Pts	Qualification	Sweden	Iceland	Slovakia	Hungary	Latvia
1	Sweden	8	7	1	0	40	2	+38	22	Final tournament	—	2–0	7–0	8–0	7–0
2	Iceland	8	6	1	1	25	5	+20	19	Final tournament	1–1	—	1–0	4–1	9–0
3	Slovakia	8	3	1	4	7	19	−12	10		0–6	1–3	—	0–0	2–0
4	Hungary	8	2	1	5	11	20	−9	7		0–5	0–1	1–2	—	4–0
5	Latvia	8	0	0	8	2	39	−37	0		1–4	0–6	1–2	0–5	—

Source: UEFA
Rules for classification: Tiebreakers

== Matches ==
Times are CET/CEST, (Note: CEST (UTC+2) for dates between 31 March and 26 October 2019 and between 29 March and 24 October 2020, and CET (UTC+1) for all other dates.) as listed by UEFA (local times, if different, are in parentheses).

29 August 2019
20:45 (18:45 WET)

Iceland	4–1	Hungary
Jensen 10', 90+2'; Eiríksdóttir 59'; Brynjarsdóttir 65'	Report	Csiszár 42'

Laugardalsvöllur, Reykjavík
Attendance: 2,019
Referee: Abigail Marriott (England)

2 September 2019
20:45 (18:45 WET)

Iceland	1–0	Slovakia
Jensen 65'	Report

Laugardalsvöllur, Reykjavík
Attendance: 2,346
Referee: Irena Velevačkoska (North Macedonia)

3 September 2019
18:00 (19:00 EEST)

Latvia	1–4	Sweden
Ševcova 14'	Report	Sembrant 32'; Ilestedt 50'; Seger 59' (pen.); Asllani 68'

Daugava Stadium, Liepāja
Attendance: 673
Referee: Emanuela Rusta (Albania)

4 October 2019
18:00 (19:00 EEST)

Latvia	1–2	Slovakia
Miksone 3'	Report	Hmírová 33'; Vojteková 74'

Daugava Stadium, Liepāja
Attendance: 206
Referee: Aleksandra Česen (Slovenia)
4 October 2019
20:15

Hungary	0–5	Sweden
	Report	Eriksson 13'; Janogy 46', 51'; Jakobsson 90+3'; Kullashi 90+5'

Diósgyőri Stadion, Miskolc
Attendance: 1,428
Referee: Melis Özçiğdem (Turkey)

8 October 2019
18:45

Sweden	7–0	Slovakia
Asllani 26'; Hurtig 30'; Sembrant 34'; Björn 60'; Blackstenius 65', 68'; Rolfö 90'	Report

Gamla Ullevi, Gothenburg
Attendance: 9,748
Referee: Elvira Nurmustafina (Kazakhstan)
8 October 2019
19:00 (20:00 EEST)

Latvia	0–6	Iceland
	Report	Friðriksdóttir 17', 45+2'; Brynjarsdóttir 29'; Jensen 50'; Jóhannsdóttir 81'; Viðarsdóttir 90+5'

Daugava Stadium, Liepāja
Attendance: 84
Referee: Vivian Peeters (Netherlands)

8 November 2019
17:00

Slovakia	0–0	Hungary
	Report

NTC Senec, Senec
Attendance: 395
Referee: Monika Mularczyk (Poland)

12 November 2019
20:00

Hungary	4–0	Latvia
Jakabfi 13'; Zeller 36'; Fenyvesi 56'; Pusztai 77'	Report

Rohonci út, Szombathely
Attendance: 570
Referee: Volha Tsiareshka (Belarus)

17 September 2020 (Note: All matches originally scheduled to be played in April and June 2020 were postponed due to the COVID-19 pandemic in Europe. These matches were subsequently rescheduled to be played between September and December 2020.)
18:45

Sweden	8–0	Hungary
Hurtig 11', 69'; Anvegård 59', 64', 72'; Eriksson 67'; Ilestedt 71'; Sembrant 90'	Report

Gamla Ullevi, Gothenburg
Attendance: 0
Referee: Rebecca Welch (England)
17 September 2020
20:45 (18:45 WET)

Iceland	9–0	Latvia
Jensen 1'; Jónsdóttir 8', 32'; Brynjarsdóttir 19', 22', 39'; Miksone 71' (o.g.); Jóhannsdóttir 87'; Vilhjálmsdóttir 90+2'	Report

Laugardalsvöllur, Reykjavík
Attendance: 10
Referee: Désirée Grundbacher (Switzerland)

22 September 2020
17:00

Latvia	0–5	Hungary
	Report	Zeller 9', 26'; Pusztai 33'; Turányi 54', 90+3'

Daugava Stadium, Liepāja
Attendance: 0
Referee: Lizzy van Der Helm (Netherlands)
22 September 2020
20:00 (18:00 WET)

Iceland	1–1	Sweden
Jensen 61'	Report	Anvegård 33'

Laugardalsvöllur, Reykjavík
Attendance: 0
Referee: Ivana Martinčić (Croatia)

22 October 2020 (Note: Match originally scheduled to be played on 17 September 2020 was rearranged following postponements to other matches due to the COVID-19 pandemic in Europe.)
18:45

Sweden	7–0	Latvia
Hurtig 1'; Anvegård 10'; Schough 13'; Eriksson 27'; Hammarlund 45', 54'; Curmark 86'	Report

Gamla Ullevi, Gothenburg
Attendance: 0
Referee: Maria Marotta (Italy)

23 October 2020 (Note: Matches originally scheduled to be played on 22 September 2020 were rearranged following postponements to other matches due to the COVID-19 pandemic in Europe.)
20:00

Hungary	1–2	Slovakia
Pusztai 90+2'	Report	Hmírová 68'; Mikolajová 80'

Illovszky Rudolf Stadion, Budapest
Attendance: 600
Referee: Hristiyana Guteva (Belarus)

27 October 2020
18:00

Slovakia	2–0	Latvia
Hmírová 8' (pen.), 34' (pen.)	Report

NTC Senec, Senec
Attendance: 0
Referee: Monika Mularczyk (Poland)
27 October 2020
18:30

Sweden	2–0	Iceland
Jakobsson 25'; Schough 57'	Report

Gamla Ullevi, Gothenburg
Attendance: 0
Referee: Stéphanie Frappart (France)

26 November 2020
18:00

Slovakia	1–3	Iceland
Mikolajová 25'	Report	Þorvaldsdóttir 61'; Gunnarsdóttir 67' (pen.), 77' (pen.)

NTC Senec, Senec
Attendance: 0
Referee: Lina Lehtovaara (Finland)

1 December 2020
15:30

Hungary	0–1	Iceland
	Report	Þorvaldsdóttir 65'

Szusza Ferenc Stadion, Budapest
Attendance: 0
Referee: Iuliana Demetrescu (Romania)
1 December 2020
18:00

Slovakia	0–6	Sweden
	Report	Angeldal 22', 73'; Sembrant 34'; Rolfö 44'; Andersson 49'; Blomqvist 55'

Anton Malatinský Stadium, Trnava
Attendance: 0
Referee: Karoline Wacker (Germany)

== Goalscorers ==
There were 85 goals scored in 21 matches, for an average of 4.05 goals per match (as of 1 December 2020).

6 goals

- (Iceland) Elín Metta Jensen

5 goals

- (Iceland) Dagný Brynjarsdóttir
- (Sweden) Anna Anvegård

4 goals

- (Slovakia) Patrícia Hmírová
- (Sweden) Lina Hurtig
- (Sweden) Linda Sembrant

3 goals

- (Hungary) Sára Pusztai
- (Hungary) Dóra Zeller
- (Sweden) Magdalena Eriksson

2 goals

- (Hungary) Lilla Turányi
- (Iceland) Fanndís Friðriksdóttir
- (Iceland) Sara Björk Gunnarsdóttir
- (Iceland) Alexandra Jóhannsdóttir
- (Iceland) Sveindís Jane Jónsdóttir
- (Iceland) Berglind Björg Þorvaldsdóttir
- (Slovakia) Mária Mikolajová
- (Sweden) Filippa Angeldal
- (Sweden) Kosovare Asllani
- (Sweden) Stina Blackstenius
- (Sweden) Pauline Hammarlund
- (Sweden) Amanda Ilestedt
- (Sweden) Sofia Jakobsson
- (Sweden) Madelen Janogy
- (Sweden) Fridolina Rolfö
- (Sweden) Olivia Schough

1 goal

- (Hungary) Henrietta Csiszár
- (Hungary) Evelin Fenyvesi
- (Hungary) Zsanett Jakabfi
- (Iceland) Hlín Eiríksdóttir
- (Iceland) Margrét Lára Viðarsdóttir
- (Iceland) Karólína Lea Vilhjálmsdóttir
- (Latvia) Karlīna Miksone
- (Latvia) Olga Ševcova
- (Slovakia) Jana Vojteková
- (Sweden) Jonna Andersson
- (Sweden) Nathalie Björn
- (Sweden) Rebecka Blomqvist
- (Sweden) Filippa Curmark
- (Sweden) Loreta Kullashi
- (Sweden) Caroline Seger

1 own goal

- (Latvia) Karlīna Miksone (against Iceland)
