= Jennie Nordin =

Swedish association football player (born 1993)

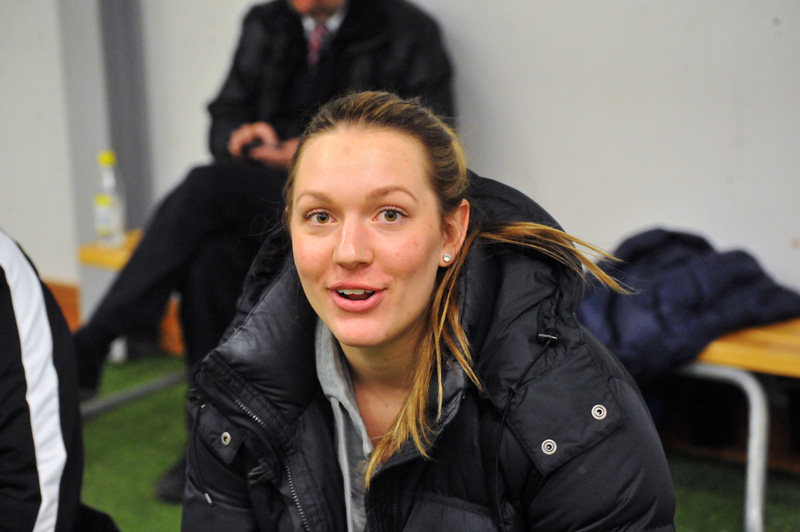
- Nordin in 2013

Personal information
- Full name: Jennie Nordin
- Date of birth: 15 May 1993 (age 33)
- Place of birth: Stockholm, Sweden
- Height: 1.79 m (5 ft 10 in)
- Position: Defender

Team information
- Current team: Piteå IF
- Number: 4

Youth career
- Solrød FC
- Ekerö IK
- 2007–2010: AIK

Senior career*
Years	Team	Apps	(Gls)
2010–2012	AIK	38	(6)
2013–2014	Linköpings FC	20	(1)
2015	AIK	19	(0)
2016–2017	Vålerenga	44	(8)
2018–2020	Växjö DFF	55	(3)
2021	Piteå IF	20	(2)
2022–	AIK	53	(10)

International career
2011–2012	Sweden U19	16	(0)
2014–2015	Sweden U23	13	(0)
- * Club domestic league appearances and goals as of 4 May 2024

Jennie Nordin (born 15 May 1993) is a Swedish footballer who plays as a defender for AIK Fotboll.

== Club career ==
Impressive performances for the victorious Sweden team at the 2012 UEFA Women's Under-19 Championship made Nordin a transfer target for several leading Damallsvenskan clubs. She opted to join Linköpings FC but missed the first half of the 2013 Damallsvenskan campaign due to injury. She broke into the team in the second half of the season, playing alongside Charlotte Rohlin at centre-back when Nilla Fischer left for VfL Wolfsburg.

In March 2018, Nordin signed for newly-promoted Växjö DFF after spending two years in Norway's Toppserien with Vålerenga.

== Personal life ==
Nordin's father Krister Nordin was also a professional footballer. Like Jennie, Krister spent much of his career with AIK. The first team that Jennie ever played for was Solrød FC in Denmark, as the family had moved there when her father was playing for Brøndby IF.

== Honours ==
Sweden U19

Winner

- UEFA Women's Under-19 Championship: 2012
