= Malin Diaz =

Swedish football midfielder

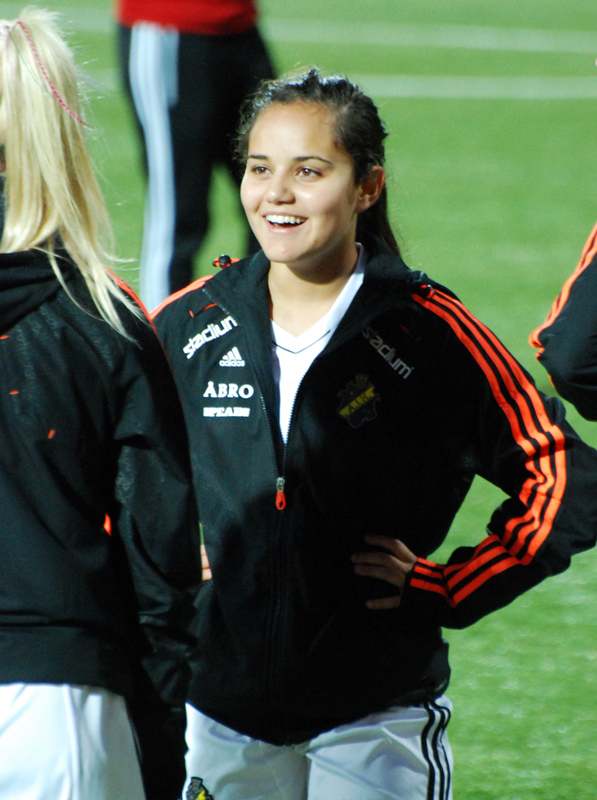
- Diaz in 2012

Personal information
- Full name: Malin Sophie Diaz Pettersson
- Date of birth: 3 January 1994 (age 32)
- Place of birth: Kiruna, Sweden
- Height: 1.55 m (5 ft 1 in)
- Position: Midfielder

Team information
- Current team: Djurgårdens IF
- Number: 8

Youth career
- Vendelsö IK
- AIK

Senior career*
Years	Team	Apps	(Gls)
2009–2012	AIK	58	(5)
2013–2014	Tyresö FF	6	(0)
2014–2017	Eskilstuna United	63	(1)
2018–2020	Djurgårdens IF	42	(0)

International career^{‡}
- Sweden U19
2013	Sweden U23	3	(0)
2014–2016	Sweden	16	(1)
- * Club domestic league appearances and goals as of 26 March 2023 ‡ National team caps and goals as of 2017

Malin Sophie Diaz Pettersson (born 3 January 1994) is a former Swedish football midfielder who have played at club level for AIK, Tyresö FF, Eskilstuna United DFF, and Djurgårdens IF of the Damallsvenskan. Diaz has represented the Sweden national team at senior level.

== Early life ==
Malin was born to Swedish man Thomas Pettersson and Claudia Díaz, who had moved to Sweden from Chile aged eight after the 1973 coup d'état in her home country.

== Club career ==
Diaz made her debut for AIK in the Damallsvenskan as a 15-year-old against Sunnanå SK in October 2009. She started her first match a week later against Kopparbergs/Göteborg FC, in which she also scored her first goal for the club. She finished the 2009 season having played two matches, with one start and one goal. After returning to AIK for the 2010 Damallsvenskan season, she made 16 starts in 19 appearances for a total of 1,488 minutes played. She scored two goals: one during a match against Kristianstad on 3 July in which AIK won 3–1 and another during a 2–2 draw against Umeå on 19 September.

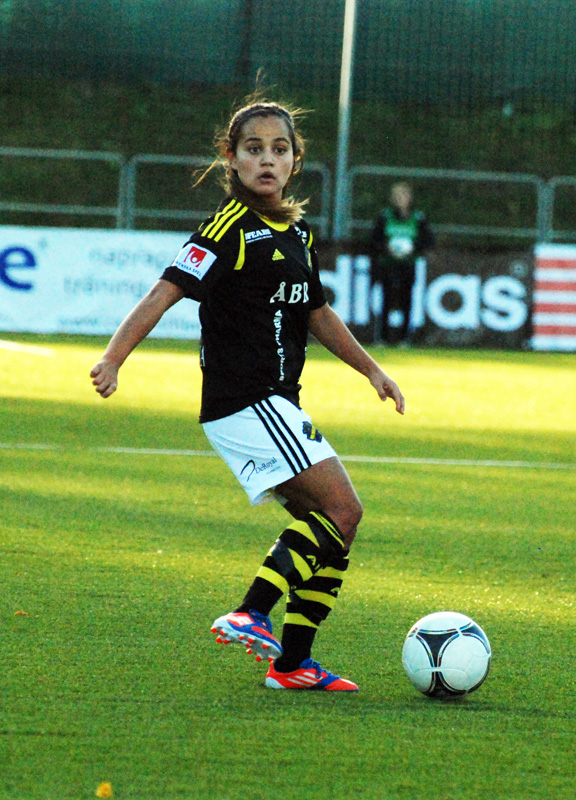
Playing for AIK in October 2012

Following AIK's relegation, Diaz made 17 Norrettan appearances during the 2011 season, where she scored two goals and made five assists, as the club won promotion back to the Damallsvenskan. Diaz signed a new two-year contract with AIK ahead of the 2012 season. She made 21 appearances with 19 starts for a total of 1,656 minutes on the pitch for AIK during the 2012 season.

In January 2013, with AIK relegated again after a 3–4–15 season ended with them bottom of the league table, Diaz signed for league champions Tyresö. She reasoned that, although it would be difficult to break into the team, training alongside Tyresö's star names would improve her as a player. She made her debut for Tyresö during a match against Sunnanå SK on 19 May 2013, which her new team won 10–2.

Diaz was frustrated with her backup role and came close to quitting Tyresö, before she began to play more regularly in 2014. She started Tyresö's 4–3 defeat by Wolfsburg in the 2014 UEFA Women's Champions League Final. Tyresö had suffered a financial collapse in 2014 and withdrew from the league, expunging all their results and making all their players free agents. In June 2014 Umeå IK announced that they were in negotiations to sign Diaz.

Instead Diaz signed for ambitious Damallsvenskan newcomers Eskilstuna United DFF during the summer break. "Eskilstuna is a team on the up and I have the same feeling, to continue to grow," she said.

After 3 1/2 seasons in Eskilstuna United, Diaz joined Djurgårdens IF for the 2018 season. In April 2021, she paused her career because of pregnancy.

== International career ==
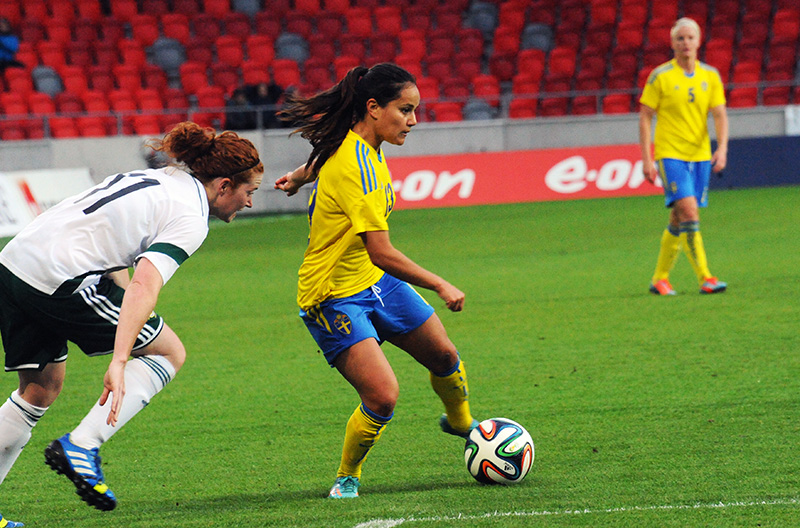
With Sweden in May 2014

As a Swedish under-19 international, Diaz featured at the 2012 U-19 European Championship. She scored the victorious Swedish team's extra time goal in the 1–0 final win over Spain. Reporters covering the tournament for UEFA praised Diaz's technique and passing, naming her among ten "emerging talents".

In December 2012, national team coach Pia Sundhage called up Diaz to a senior squad training camp at Bosön. Diaz was also capped for Sweden at under-23 level.

Diaz was called into the senior Sweden squad for the 2015 FIFA Women's World Cup qualifying match against Northern Ireland in April 2014, after injured Caroline Seger withdrew. She appeared as an injury time substitute in Portadown, to win her first senior cap. Diaz started her first match for the Blågult in June 2014, a 5–0 win over the Faroe Islands.

In May 2015, Diaz and Eskilstuna team-mates Olivia Schough and Sara Thunebro were named in Sundhage's Sweden squad for the 2015 FIFA Women's World Cup in Canada.

=== International goals ===
Key (expand for notes on "international goals" and sorting)
Location	Geographic location of the venue where the competition occurred Sorted by country name first, then by city name
Lineup	Start – played entire match on minute (off player) – substituted on at the minute indicated, and player was substituted off at the same time off minute (on player) – substituted off at the minute indicated, and player was substituted on at the same time (c) – captain Sorted by minutes played
#	NumberOfGoals.goalNumber scored by the player in the match (alternate notation to Goal in match)
Min	The minute in the match the goal was scored. For list that include caps, blank indicates played in the match but did not score a goal.
Assist/pass	The ball was passed by the player, which assisted in scoring the goal. This column depends on the availability and source of this information.
penalty or pk	Goal scored on penalty-kick which was awarded due to foul by opponent. (Goals scored in penalty-shoot-out, at the end of a tied match after extra-time, are not included.)
Score	The match score after the goal was scored. Sorted by goal difference, then by goal scored by the player's team
Result	The final score. Sorted by goal difference in the match, then by goal difference in penalty-shoot-out if it is taken, followed by goal scored by the player's team in the match, then by goal scored in the penalty-shoot-out. For matches with identical final scores, match ending in extra-time without penalty-shoot-out is a tougher match, therefore precede matches that ended in regulation
aet	The score at the end of extra-time; the match was tied at the end of 90' regulation
pso	Penalty-shoot-out score shown in parentheses; the match was tied at the end of extra-time
	Green background color – exhibition or closed door international friendly match
	Yellow background color – match at an invitational tournament
	Red background color – Olympic women's football qualification match
	Light-blue background color – FIFA women's world cup qualification match
	Pink background color – Olympic women's football tournament
	Blue background color – FIFA women's world cup final tournament
NOTE: some keys may not apply for a particular football player

Goal	Date	Location	Opponent	#	Score	Result	Competition
1	2015-09-22	Gothenburg, Sweden	Poland	1.1	3–0	3–0	Euro 2017 qualifying

== Honours ==
=== International ===
Sweden

- UEFA Women's Under-19 Championship (1): 2012
