= Aleksandra Savanović =

Serbian footballer (born 1994)

Personal information
- Full name: Aleksandra Savanović
- Date of birth: 30 August 1994 (age 32)
- Place of birth: Serbia, FR Yugoslavia
- Position: Midfielder

Team information
- Current team: Spartak Subotica
- Number: 4

Senior career*
Years	Team	Apps	(Gls)
2011–2014	Spartak Subotica		

International career^{‡}
2010	Serbia U17	3	(0)
2010–2013	Serbia U19	20	(4)
2010–	Serbia	12	(1)
- * Club domestic league appearances and goals as of 12:08, 3 April 2015 (UTC) ‡ National team caps and goals as of 12:08, 3 April 2015 (UTC)

Aleksandra Savanović (Serbian Cyrillic: Александра Савановић; born 30 August 1994) is a Serbian football midfielder, currently playing for Spartak Subotica.

== Honours ==
Spartak Subotica

Winner

- Serbian Super Liga (3): 2011–12, 2012–13, 2013–14
