= Filippa Curmark =

Swedish football midfielder

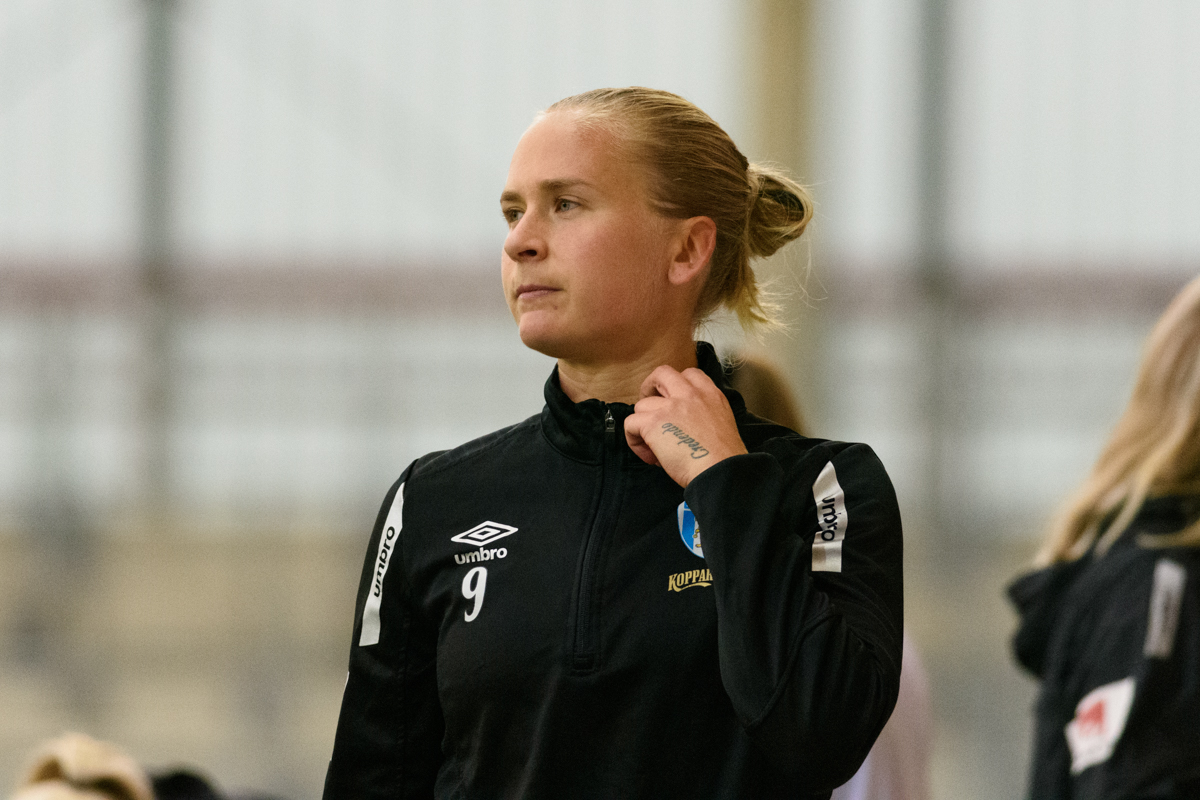

Personal information
- Date of birth: 2 August 1995 (age 31)
- Place of birth: Jönköping, Sweden
- Height: 1.67 m (5 ft 5 1/2 in)
- Position: Midfielder

Team information
- Current team: Hammarby
- Number: 5

Senior career*
Years	Team	Apps	(Gls)
2013	Kalmar	24	(5)
2014	Jitex	19	(1)
2015–2024	Häcken	96	(6)
2025–2026	ACF Fiorentina	24	(0)
2026–	Hammarby	11	(1)

International career^{‡}
2011–2012	Sweden U17	9	(0)
2013–2014	Sweden U19	12	(2)
2020–	Sweden	11	(1)
- * Club domestic league appearances and goals as of 22 November 2026 ‡ National team caps and goals as of 12 April 2022 (UTC)

Filippa Curmark (born 2 August 1995) is a Swedish footballer who plays as a midfielder for Damallsvenskan club Hammarby IF and the Sweden national team. She previously played for Elitettan club IFK Kalmar, Damallsvenskan clubs Jitex BK and BK Häcken and Serie A Women club Fiorentina, and represented Sweden at under-17 and under-19 level.

== International goal ==
Goal	Date	Location	Opponent	Score	Result	Competition
1	2020-10-22	Gothenburg, Sweden	Latvia	7–0	7–0	Euro 2022 qualifying
