= Raquel Pinel =

Spanish footballer

Personal information
- Full name: Raquel Pinel Sáez
- Date of birth: 30 August 1994 (age 32)
- Place of birth: Jaén, Spain
- Height: 1.69 m (5 ft 7 in)
- Position: Forward

Team information
- Current team: Alhama
- Number: 23

Senior career*
| Years | Team | Apps | (Gls) |
- Real Jaén
| 2010–2011 | Sporting Huelva | 17 | (2) |
| 2011–2013 | Valencia | 61 | (7) |
| 2013–2014 | Sant Gabriel | 25 | (5) |
| 2014–2018 | Aldaia | | |
| 2018–2021 | Sevilla | 84 | (18) |
| 2021–2022 | Villarreal | 25 | (1) |
| 2022- | Alhama | 5 | (0) |

International career
| 2009–2010 | Spain U17 | | |
| 2011–2013 | Spain U19 | | |
- * Club domestic league appearances and goals as of 22:40, 27 November 2022 (UTC)

Raquel Pinel Sáez (born 30 August 1994) is a Spanish football forward currently playing for Alhama CF in the Primera División. She previously played for Sporting Huelva, Sevilla and Valencia.

== Club career ==
Pinel made her debut at 15 years of age for Real Jaén. She later joined Sporting Huelva from which she transferred to Valencia in 2011. For Valencia, she won an individual award in the 2012 COTIF Women's Football Tournament, being awarded top scorer for scoring four goals during the tournament. For the 2013–14 Primera División season, she moved to Sant Gabriel, where she would stay for one season. After that, she joined Aldaia, where she would be a regular for the first team. Aldaia never achieved promotion to the Primera División during her time there and, in 2018, she transferred to top tier club Sevilla. At the end of the 2019–20 Primera División season, in which Pinel played in 19 out of 21 matches for Sevilla, scoring three goals, she renewed her contract with Sevilla for one further year. Since 2019, Pinel has played as captain for Sevilla on occasion, sharing the responsibility with Maite Albarrán and Aldana Cometti. In July 2021, after three and a half seasons at Sevilla, Pinel transferred to newly promoted Villarreal.

== International career ==
She has won the 2010 U-17 European Championships with Spain; in the tournament she scored against Denmark and the Netherlands. She also represented Spain in the 2010 U-17 World Cup where she scored three goals, one against Japan, another against Brazil and the last of them was the only goal in the bronze medal match against North Korea. In 2011, she participated in that year's U-17 European Championships, scoring a goal against Belgium in the group stages. Pinel then progressed to representing the under-19 team and represented Spain in the 2012 U-19 European Championships. In the semi-final against Portugal, she scored the game's only goal three minutes before the end of the match, which secured them a place in the final. In the final against Sweden, she played 89 minutes before being substituted in a game in which Spain lost.
