= Jasna Đorđević =

Serbian footballer (born 1993)

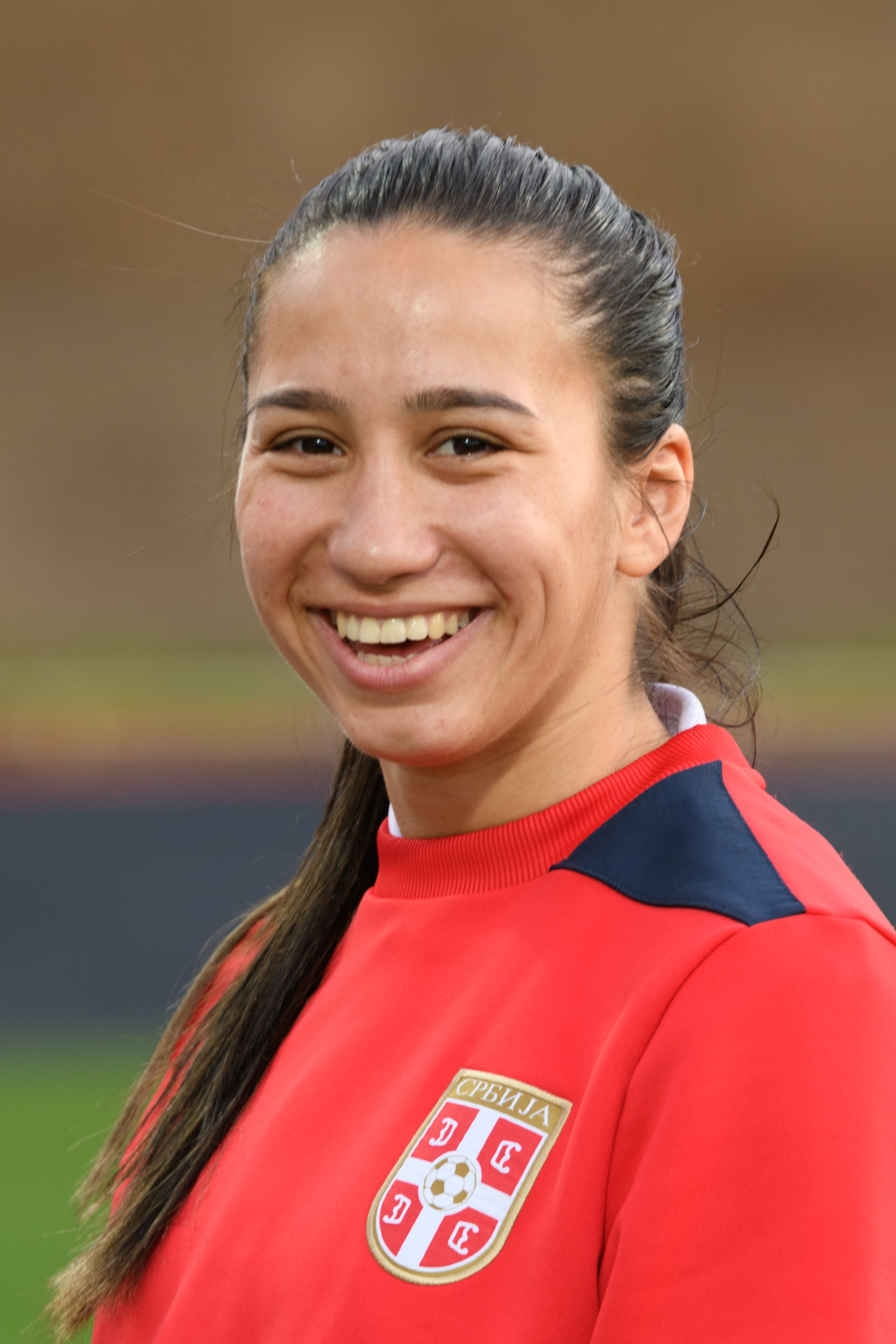
- Đorđević during FIFA Women's Football World Cup Qualification 2019.

Personal information
- Date of birth: 24 May 1993 (age 33)
- Position: Defender

Team information
- Current team: Agia Paraskevi W.F.C.

Senior career*
Years	Team	Apps	(Gls)
- Mašinac Niš
2013–2015	KVK Tienen		
2016–2022	Aris Thessalonikis		
2022–2025	Nees Atromitou		
2025–	Agia Paraskevi	24	(1)

International career^{‡}
2008–2009	Serbia U17	5	(0)
2012	Serbia U19	3	(0)
2012–	Serbia	10	(0)
- * Club domestic league appearances and goals as of 4 June 2026 ‡ National team caps and goals as of 19:48, 30 August 2019 (UTC)

Jasna Đorđević (Serbian Cyrillic: Јасна Ђорђевић; born 24 May 1993) is a Serbian footballer who plays as a defender for Greek club Agia Paraskevi and has appeared for the Serbia women's national team.

== Career ==
Đorđević has been capped for the Serbia national team, appearing for the team during the 2019 FIFA Women's World Cup qualifying cycle.
