= ŽFK LASK =

LASK
- Full name: ŽFK LASK Lazarevac
- Founded: 27.01.2003
- Dissolved: 2011
- Ground: FK Lazarevac stadium, Lazarevac
- Capacity: 4,000
- League: Prva ženska liga
- 2010-2011: 5th
Home colours	Away colours

ŽFK LASK (Serbian Cyrillic: ЖФК ЛАСК) was a women's football club based in Lazarevac, Serbia. The club played in Serbia's top level league, the Prva ženska liga.

The team began playing in 2003 and had its first season in the top league in 2006-07, finishing in 9th place out of 10 teams. Since then, the team consistently placed above 6th place, with the best result being a third-place in 2007-08.

In 2011, LASK was absorbed by SD Crvena Zvezda, becoming its women's football team.

== Former players ==
- Milica Mijatović
- Andrijana Trišić
