= Samantha Quayle =

Welsh footballer (born 1995)

Sam Quayle
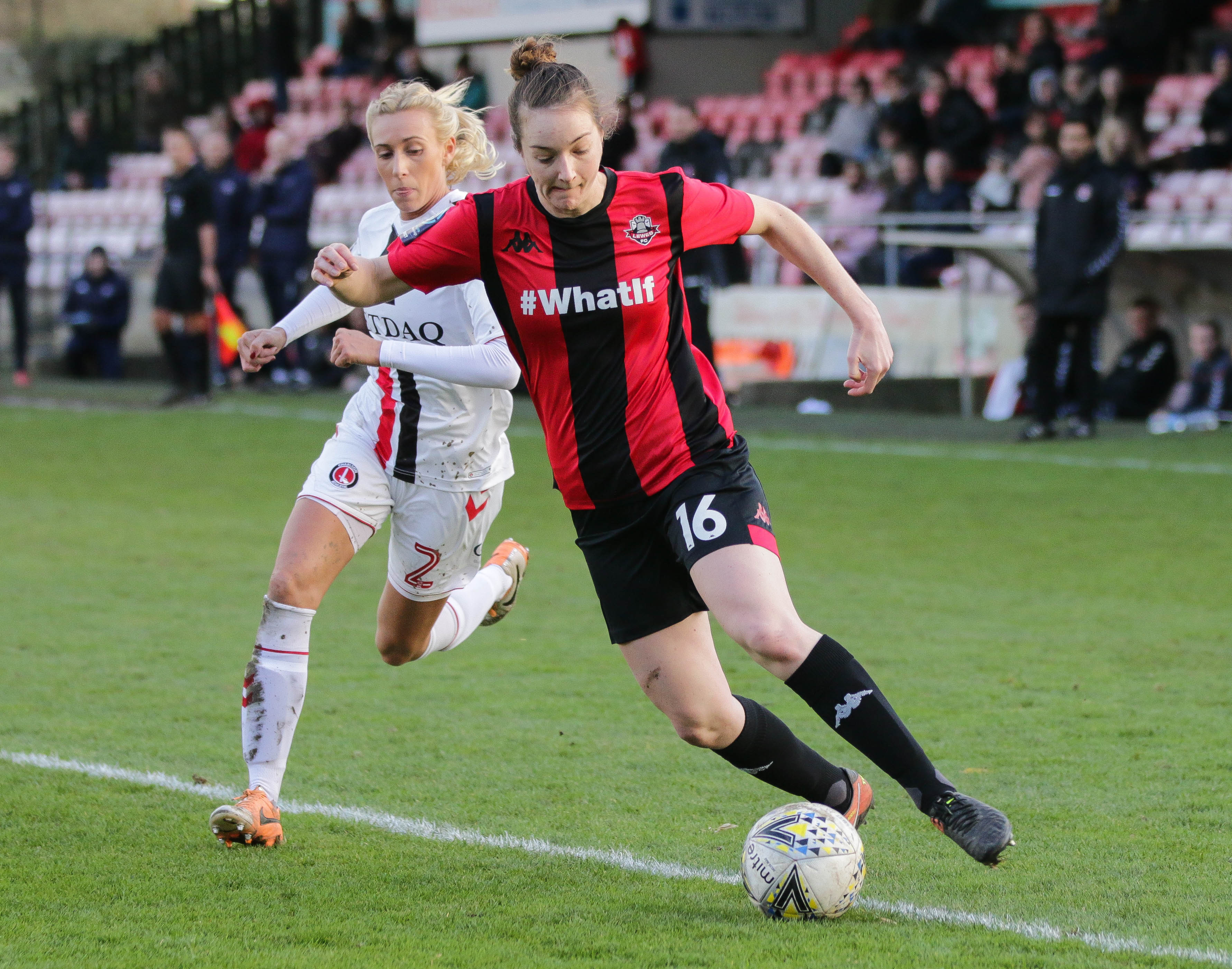
- Quayle (16) playing for Lewes in 2018

Personal information
- Full name: Samantha Quayle
- Date of birth: 8 October 1995 (age 31)
- Position: Winger

Team information
- Current team: Portsmouth
- Number: 23

Youth career
- Bristol Academy

Senior career*
Years	Team	Apps	(Gls)
2013–2014	Bristol Academy	0	(0)
2014–2015	Coventry United	24	(4)
2015–2016	Yeovil Town	7	(0)
2016	→ Portsmouth (loan)	4	(2)
2016–2018	Portsmouth	50	(33)
2018–2021	Lewes	27	(3)
2021–2022	Portsmouth	45	(5)
2022–2022	→ Worthing (Loan)	N/K	(N/K)
2022–	Worthing	16	(10)

International career^{‡}
2012	Wales U17	2	(0)
2013–2014	Wales U19	5	(1)
2011–2014	Wales	10	(0)
- * Club domestic league appearances and goals as of 15 March 2024 ‡ National team caps and goals as of 15 March 2024

Samantha "Sam" Quayle (born 8 October 1995) is a footballer who has played for various English teams with most of her appearances (99) and goals (40) coming during spells at Portsmouth. She has also played for the Wales national team.

She currently plays for Worthing.
