= Aleksandra Ristovska =

Macedonian footballer

Personal information
- Date of birth: 21 August 1995 (age 31)
- Position: Forward

Team information
- Current team: Tiverija

Senior career*
| Years | Team | Apps | (Gls) |
- Tiverija

International career^{‡}
| 2011 | Macedonia U17 | 3 | (0) |
| 2012–2013 | Macedonia U19 | 4 | (1) |
| 2015– | North Macedonia | 13 | (0) |
- * Club domestic league appearances and goals ‡ National team caps and goals as of 27 November 2020

Aleksandra Ristovska (Macedonian: Александра Ристовска; born 21 August 1995) is a Macedonian footballer who plays as a forward for 1. liga club ŽFK Tiverija Istatov and the North Macedonia women's national team.
