= Irina Pando =

Swiss footballer (born 1995)

Personal information
- Full name: Irina Pando-Brütsch
- Date of birth: 24 July 1995 (age 31)
- Place of birth: Zürich, Switzerland
- Height: 1.78 m (5 ft 10 in)
- Position: Defender

Team information
- Current team: Zürich
- Number: 4

Senior career*
Years	Team	Apps	(Gls)
2012–2015	Zürich		
2016–2021	Luzern		
2021–2022	Bayer Leverkusen	21	(3)
2022–	Zürich	21	(3)

International career^{‡}
2013–2014	Switzerland U19	7	(2)
2018–	Switzerland	4	(2)
- * Club domestic league appearances and goals as of 01:05, 21 August 2022 (UTC) ‡ National team caps and goals as of 21:50, 15 March 2021 (UTC)

Irina Pando (born 24 July 1995) is a Swiss footballer who plays as a defender for Zürich and the Switzerland national team.

== International career ==
Pando made her debut for the Switzerland national team on 14 January 2020, as a starter against Malta.
