= Pauline Rubin (footballer) =

Swedish footballer (born 1994)

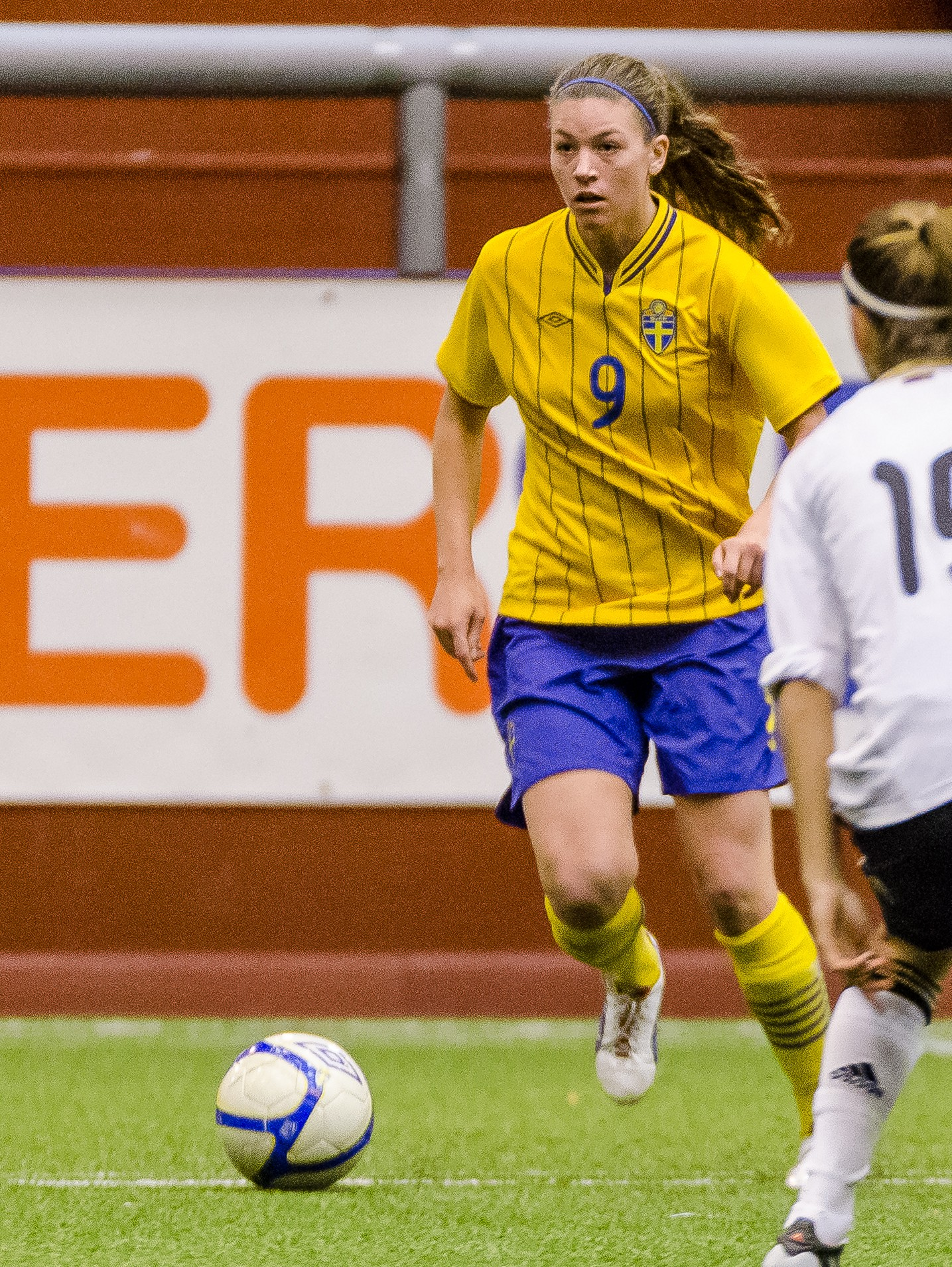
- Hammarlund with Sweden in 2012

Personal information
- Full name: Pauline Louise Hammarlund
- Date of birth: 7 May 1994 (age 32)
- Place of birth: Stockholm, Sweden
- Height: 1.72 m (5 ft 8 in)
- Position: Striker

Team information
- Current team: Djurgårdens IF
- Number: 9

Youth career
- Skogås-Trångsunds FF

Senior career*
Years	Team	Apps	(Gls)
2010–2012	Tyresö	26	(0)
2013	Linköpings FC	18	(2)
2014–2015	Piteå IF	41	(17)
2016–2022	BK Häcken	104	(58)
2023–2024	Fiorentina	33	(4)
2024–	Djurgårdens IF	11	(2)

International career^{‡}
2010	Sweden U17	8	(3)
2011–2013	Sweden U19	27	(11)
2013–2019	Sweden U23	16	(7)
2015–	Sweden	24	(8)
Medal record
Olympic Games
Silver medal – second place	2016 Rio de Janeiro	Team
- * Club domestic league appearances and goals as of 6 May 2024 ‡ National team caps and goals as of 4 June 2024

Pauline Louise Rubin (née Hammarlund; born 7 May 1994) is a Swedish footballer who plays as a striker for Swedish Damallsvenskan club Djurgårdens IF and the Sweden national team. She previously played for Linköpings FC, Piteå IF, BK Häcken, and Fiorentina.

== Club career ==
Hammarlund joined Djurgården from Fiorentina in July 2024 on a one-and-a-half year contract.

== International career ==
Hammarlund made her debut for the senior Sweden team in a 3–0 UEFA Women's Euro 2017 qualifying win over Moldova on 17 September 2015, in which she also scored her first international goal.

== Career statistics ==
=== International ===
As of match played 4 June 2024

Appearances and goals by national team and year
National team	Year	Apps	Goals
Sweden	2015	2	1
Sweden	2016	9	3
Sweden	2017	7	0
Sweden	2020	2	2
Sweden	2024	4	2
Total		24	8

Scores and results list Sweden's goal tally first, score column indicates score after each Hammarlund goal.

List of international goals scored by Pauline Hammarlund
No.	Date	Venue	Opponent	Score	Result	Competition
1	17 September 2015	CSR Orhei, Orhei, Moldova	Moldova	3–0	3–0	2017 UEFA Women's Euro qualification
2	26 January 2016	Prioritet Serneke Arena, Gothenburg, Sweden	Scotland	5–0	6–0	Friendly
3	26 January 2016	Prioritet Serneke Arena, Gothenburg, Sweden	Scotland	6–0	6–0	Friendly
4	15 September 2016	Gamla Ullevi, Gothenburg, Sweden	Slovakia	2–1	2–1	2017 UEFA Women's Euro qualification
5	22 October 2020	Gamla Ullevi, Gothenburg, Sweden	Latvia	5–0	7–0	2022 UEFA Women's Euro qualification
6	22 October 2020	Gamla Ullevi, Gothenburg, Sweden	Latvia	6–0	7–0	2022 UEFA Women's Euro qualification
7	23 February 2024	Bosnia and Herzegovina FA Training Centre, Zenica, Bosnia and Herzegovina	Bosnia and Herzegovina	4–0	5–0	2023–24 UEFA Women's Nations League
8	28 February 2024	Tele2 Arena, Stockholm, Sweden	Bosnia and Herzegovina	5–0	5–0	2023–24 UEFA Women's Nations League

== Personal life ==
In August 2025, Hammarlund married Niklas Rubin who is a professional ice hockey goalkeeper.
