= Lana Gorgadze =

Georgian footballer

Personal information
- Date of birth: 15 February 1997 (age 29)
- Position: Midfielder

International career^{‡}
Years	Team	Apps	(Gls)
- Georgia
- ‡ National team caps and goals as of 19:38, 30 August 2019 (UTC)

Lana Gorgadze (born 15 February 1997) is a Georgian footballer who plays as a midfielder and has appeared for the Georgia women's national team.

== Career ==
Gorgadze has been capped for the Georgia national team, appearing for the team during the 2019 FIFA Women's World Cup qualifying cycle.
