= Nicole Bauer =

German politician (FDP)

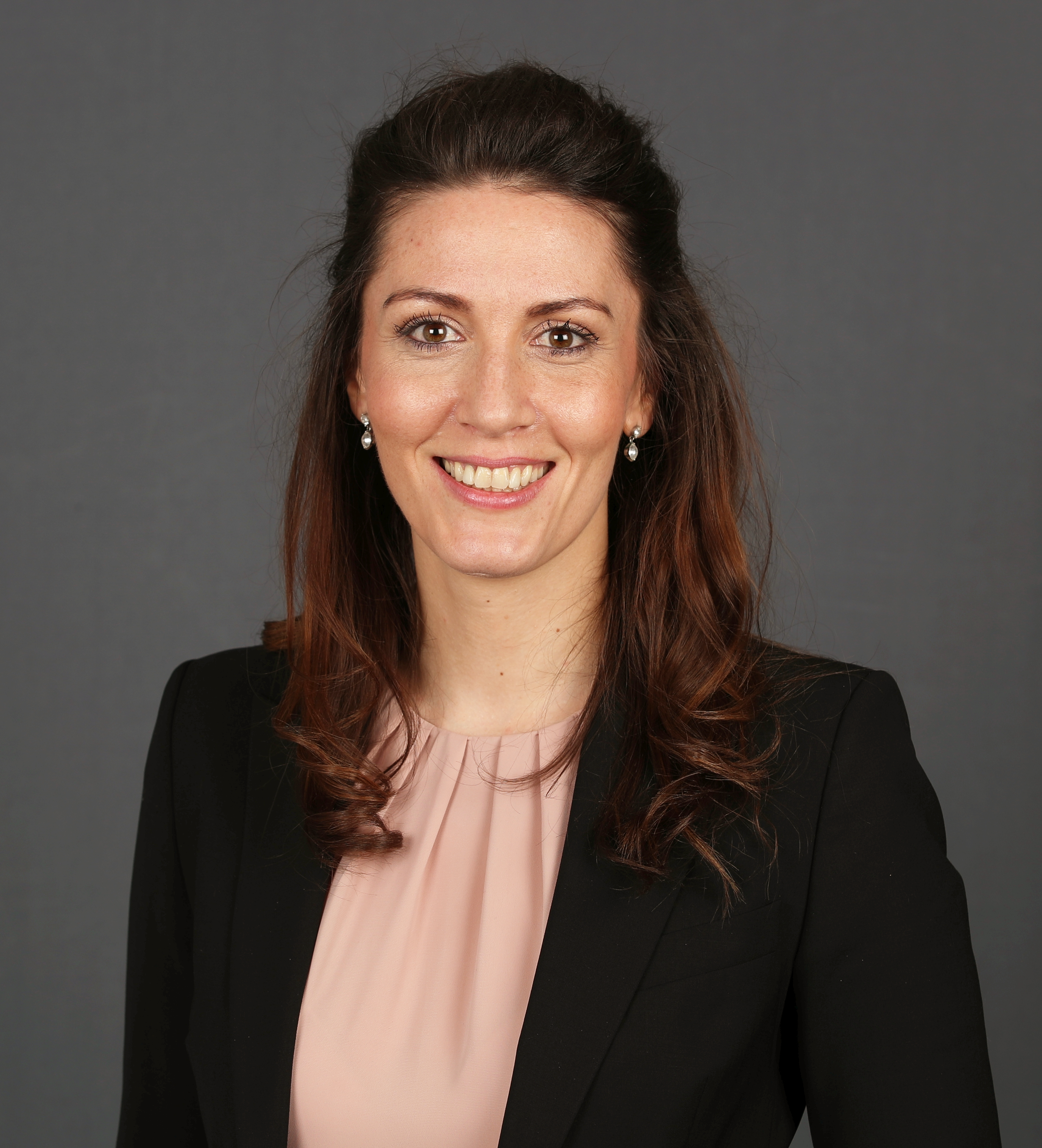
- Bauer in 2020

Member of the Bundestag for Bavaria
- In office 24 October 2017 – 2025
- Constituency: FDP List

Personal details
- Born: 19 March 1987 (age 39) Vilsbiburg, West Germany
- Party: Free Democratic Party
- Education: University of Applied Sciences Landshut

Nicole Bauer (born 19 March 1987) is a German industrial engineer and politician of the Free Democratic Party (FDP) who served as a member of the Bundestag from the state of Bavaria from 2017 to 2024.

== Early life and career ==
After graduating in 2003 at the Staatliche Realschule Landshut, Bauer completed her vocational baccalaureate at the Fachoberschule Landshut in 2005. She completed her studies at the University of Applied Sciences Landshut with a focus on electronics, systems and technologies. She received her diploma as industrial engineer in 2009.

Bauer is a graduate industrial engineer (FH) in the field of electrical engineering. From 2009 to 2012, she worked as an industrial engineer at Maschinenfabrik Reinhausen GmbH in Regensburg and from 2012 to 2018 in the drive system division of BMW in Munich.

== Political career ==
Bauer has been a member of the Free Democrats since 2010. She became a member of the Bundestag in the 2017 German federal election, representing Landshut. During her time in parliament, she served on the Committee on Food and Agriculture and the Committee on Family Affairs, Senior Citizens, Women and Youth. She was her parliamentary group’s spokesperson on women's policy.

In the negotiations to form a so-called traffic light coalition of the Social Democratic Party (SPD), the Green Party and the FDP following the 2021 federal elections, Bauer was part of her party's delegation in the working group on climate change and energy policy, co-chaired by Matthias Miersch, Oliver Krischer and Lukas Köhler.
