= Julia Wahlberg =

Swedish footballer

Personal information
- Date of birth: 29 September 1995
- Position: Midfielder

Senior career*
Years	Team	Apps	(Gls)
2011–2012	Kungsbacka DFF	30	(2)
2013	Jitex BK	20	(0)
2014–2015	Kopparbergs/Göteborg FC	22	(0)

International career^{‡}
2011–2012	Sweden U17	5	(0)
2011–2014	Sweden U19	22	(2)
- * Club domestic league appearances and goals as of 06:13, 17 February 2016 (UTC) ‡ National team caps and goals as of 26 October 2014

Julia Wahlberg (born 29 September 1995) is a Swedish footballer who last played for Kopparbergs/Göteborg FC in the fully professional Damallsvenskan, the highest Swedish women's league, as a midfielder. Wahlberg played for Jitex BK in 2013. She has also played for the Swedish U17 and U19 teams.
