= List of Swedish women's football champions =

Swedish women's football champions (Swedish: Svenska mästare i fotboll) is a title held by the winners of the highest Swedish football league played each year, Damallsvenskan.

== Champions ==
Key
^{†}	Winners also won Svenska Cupen during the same season
(number of championship titles)	A running tally of the total number of championship titles won by each club is kept in brackets.

=== Svenska riksmästerskapet (1972) ===
Year	Winner	Runners-up
1973	Öxabäck IF (unofficial)	

=== Svenska mästerskapet (1973–1977) ===
Year	Winner	Runners-up
1973	Öxabäck IF (1)	
1974	Jitex BK (1)	
1975	Öxabäck IF (2)	
1976	Jitex BK (2)	
1977	Jakobsbergs GoIF (1)	

=== Division 1 (1978–1987) ===
Year	Winner	Runners-up
1978	Öxabäck IF (3)	
1979	Jitex BK (3)	
1980	Sunnanå SK (1)	
1981	Jitex BK (4)^{†}	
1982	Sunnanå SK (2)	
1983	Öxabäck IF (4)	
1984	Jitex BK (5)^{†}	
1985	Hammarby IF (1)	
1986	Malmö FF (1)	
1987	Öxabäck IF (5)^{†}	

=== Damallsvenskan Play-offs (1988–1992) ===
Year	Winner	Runners-up
1988	Öxabäck IF (6)^{†}	
1989	Jitex BK (6)	
1990	Malmö FF (2)^{†}	
1991	Malmö FF (3)	
1992	Gideonsbergs IF (1)	

=== Damallsvenskan (1993–1997) ===
Year	Winner	Runners-up
1993	Malmö FF (4)	
1994	Malmö FF (5)	
1995	Älvsjö AIK (1)	
1996	Älvsjö AIK (2)^{†}	
1997	Älvsjö AIK (3)	

=== Damallsvenskan Play-offs (1998–1999) ===
Year	Winner	Runners-up
1998	Älvsjö AIK (4)	
1999	Älvsjö AIK (5)^{†}	

=== Damallsvenskan (2000–) ===
Year	Winner	Runners-up
2000	Umeå IK (1)	
2001	Umeå IK (2)^{†}	
2002	Umeå IK (3)^{†}	Malmö FF
2003	Djurgården/Älvsjö (1)	
2004	Djurgården/Älvsjö (2)^{†}	
2005	Umeå IK (4)	
2006	Umeå IK (5)	Djurgården/Älvsjö
2007	Umeå IK (6)^{†}	Djurgårdens IF
2008	Umeå IK (7)	Linköpings FC
2009	Linköpings FC (1)^{†}	Umeå IK
2010	LdB FC Malmö (6)	Kopparbergs/Göteborg FC
2011	LdB FC Malmö (7)	Kopparbergs/Göteborg FC
2012	Tyresö FF (1)	LdB FC Malmö
2013	LdB FC Malmö (8)	Tyresö FF
2014	FC Rosengård (9)	KIF Örebro DFF
2015	FC Rosengård (10)	Eskilstuna United DFF
2016	Linköping FC (2)	FC Rosengård
2017	Linköping FC (3)	FC Rosengård
2018	Piteå IF (1)	Kopparbergs/Göteborg FC
2019	FC Rosengård (11)	Kopparbergs/Göteborg FC
2020	Kopparbergs/Göteborg FC (1)	FC Rosengård
2021	FC Rosengård (12)	BK Häcken
2022	FC Rosengård (13)	BK Häcken
2023	Hammarby IF (2)	BK Häcken
2024	FC Rosengård (14)	BK Häcken
2025	BK Häcken (2)	Hammarby IF
2026	BK Häcken (3)	Hammarby IF

== Performances ==
=== Total titles won by club ===
A total of 14 clubs have been crowned Swedish champions from Öxabäck IF in 1973 till Kopparbergs/Göteborg FC in 2020.
A total of 54 Swedish championships have been awarded. FC Rosengård is the most successful club with 14 Swedish championships.

Total titles won by club
Club	Winners	Runners-up	Winning seasons
FC Rosengård	14	13	1986, 1990, 1991, 1993, 1994, 2010, 2011, 2013, 2014, 2015, 2019, 2021, 2022, 2024
Umeå IK	7	3	2000, 2001, 2002, 2005, 2006, 2007, 2008
Jitex BK	6	4	1974, 1976, 1979, 1981, 1984, 1989
Öxabäcks IF	6	1	1973, 1975, 1978, 1983, 1987, 1988
Älvsjö AIK	5	2	1995, 1996, 1997, 1998, 1999
BK Häcken	3	8	2020, 2025, 2026
Linköping FC	3	1	2009, 2016, 2017
Hammarby IF	2	3	1985, 2023
Djurgården/Älvsjö	2	2	2003, 2004
Sunnanå SK	2	0	1980, 1982
Gideonsbergs IF	1	1	1992
Tyresö FF	1	1	2012
Jakobsbergs GoIF	1	0	1977
Piteå IF	1	0	2018

== See also ==
- Damallsvenskan
- Football in Sweden
- Swedish football league system
- List of Damallsvenskan top scorers
- List of Swedish youth football champions
