= List of Linköpings FC seasons =

This is a list of seasons played by Linköpings FC, a Swedish women's football club created in 2003 and based in Linköping.

== Summary ==
Domestic and international results of Linköpings FC
Season	League										Cup	Europe		League top scorers					
Season	Division	Tier	Pos	P	W	D	L	F	A	Pts	Cup	Europe		1st	Goal	2nd	Goal	3rd	Goal
2004–05	2004 Damallsvenskan	1	6	22	8	4	10	28	37	36									
2005–06	2005 Damallsvenskan	1	4	22	11	3	8	41	28	36									
2006–07	2006 Damallsvenskan	1	3	22	12	5	5	43	25	41	W								
2007–08	2007 Damallsvenskan	1	6	22	10	5	7	40	30	35	QF			(Sweden) Aronsson	9	(Sweden) Öqvist	5	4 players	4
2008–09	2008 Damallsvenskan	1	2	22	17	2	3	54	19	53	W			(Sweden) Landström	11	(Sweden) Asllani	8	(Sweden) Öqvist	8
2009–10	2009 Damallsvenskan	1	1	22	15	4	3	45	11	49	W	Champions League	R16	(Sweden) Asllani	12	(Sweden) Landström	12	(Sweden) Seger	5
2010–11	2010 Damallsvenskan	1	3	22	11	7	4	39	15	40	SF	Champions League	QF	(Finland) Sällström	10	(Sweden) Öqvist	9	(Sweden) Rohlin	5
2011–12	2011 Damallsvenskan	1	6	22	9	8	5	30	22	35	SF			(Finland) Sällström	8	(Sweden) Fors	5	(Sweden) Asllani	4
2012–13	2012 Damallsvenskan	1	3	22	11	6	5	50	34	39	R16			(Netherlands) Melis	16	(Australia) De Vanna	7	(Sweden) Lund	6
2013–14	2013 Damallsvenskan	1	3	22	14	4	4	46	25	46	W			(Denmark) Harder	17	(Sweden) Blackstenius	9	(Sweden) Andersson	4
2014–15	2014 Damallsvenskan	1	4	20	11	5	4	43	19	38	W	Champions League	QF	(Denmark) Harder	10	(Sweden) Rolfö	8	(Norway) Minde	5
2015–16	2015 Damallsvenskan	1	4	22	14	2	6	46	17	44	RU			(Denmark) Harder	17	(Sweden) Blackstenius	7	(Norway) Minde	4
2016–17	2016 Damallsvenskan	1	1	22	20	2	0	73	14	62	RU			(Denmark) Harder	24	(Sweden) Blackstenius	20	(Norway) Minde	11
2017–18	2017 Damallsvenskan	1	1	22	16	3	3	45	24	51	TBD	Champions League	TBD	(Sweden) Banušić	11	(Norway) Minde	7	(Denmark) Kildemoes ^{N}	5
