= List of Djurgårdens IF Fotboll (women) seasons =

Djurgårdens Idrottsförening, also known simply as Djurgårdens IF, is a Swedish association football club based in Stockholm. The club is affiliated with Stockholms Fotbollförbund, and plays home games at Stockholm Olympic Stadium. The club's first team play in Elitettan as of 2015, the second-tier league in Swedish football, which takes place from April to October every seasons. Djurgården won its first Swedish title 2003 Damallsvenskan, and most recently repeated this in the 2004 Damallsvenskan.

This is a list of seasons played by Djurgårdens IF in Swedish and European football.

== Seasons ==
Season	League									Cup	Super- cupen	Other	Europe	Top goalscorer (Note: Goals in all competitions (Damallsvenskan or lower, Svenska Cupen, Supercupen and European) are counted.)	
Season	Division	P	W	D	L	GF	GA	Pts	Pos	Cup	Super- cupen	Other	Europe	Name	Gls
Djurgårdens IF
1985	Div 1 Norra	18	8	3	7	32	28	19	5th	?					
1986	Div 1 Norra	18	7	2	9	30	35	16	6th	R4					
1987	Div 1 Norra	22	7	1	14	22	51	15	11th	R4					
1988	Div 1 Norra	22	19	1	2	91	14	39	1st	R2					
1989	Damallsvenskan	22	13	2	7	39	24	28	4th	SF		PO – SF			
1990	Damallsvenskan	22	11	4	7	60	27	37 (Note: The 1990 season saw the introduction of three points for a win)	5th	SF					
1991	Damallsvenskan	22	15	1	6	69	20	46	2nd	QF		PO – SF			
1992	Damallsvenskan	22	4	2	16	24	85	14	11th	R5					
1993	Div 1 Norra	22	9	5	8	50	34	32	5th	R3					
1994	Div 1 Norra	22	9	7	6	32	31	34	5th	R4					
1995	Div 1 Mellersta	18	14	0	4	71	19	42	2nd	R6					
1996	Div 1 Norra	18	14	1	3	84	20	43	1st	R6					
1997	Damallsvenskan	22	10	5	7	51	37	35	6th	SF					
1998	Damallsvenskan	22	7	5	10	38	38	26	8th	RU					
1999	Damallsvenskan	22	14	1	7	58	27	43	4th	RU		PO – SF			
2000	Damallsvenskan	22	14	4	4	56	26	46	4th	W					
2001	Damallsvenskan	22	12	4	6	45	33	40	4th	RU				Elin Flyborg	17 (Note: League goals)
2002	Damallsvenskan	22	10	5	7	41	31	35	5th	R4				Sara Johansson	15
Djurgården/Älvsjö
2003	Damallsvenskan	22	19	1	2	94	25	58	1st	SF				Victoria Svensson	23
2004	Damallsvenskan	22	19	2	1	74	23	59	1st	W				Victoria Svensson	14
2005	Damallsvenskan	22	13	3	6	41	21	42	3rd	W			WC – RU	Victoria Svensson	8
2006	Damallsvenskan	22	13	4	5	61	23	43	2nd	QF			WC – SF	Victoria Svensson	18
Djurgårdens IF
2007	Damallsvenskan	22	16	3	3	51	20	51	2nd	R5				Victoria Svensson	16
2008	Damallsvenskan	22	9	6	7	38	29	33	5th	SF	RU			Victoria Svensson	13
2009	Damallsvenskan	22	13	2	7	53	29	41	6th	SF				Victoria Svensson	14
2010	Damallsvenskan	22	6	4	12	24	34	22	8th	RU				Sarah Michael	7
2011	Damallsvenskan	22	8	1	13	22	42	25	8th	R4				Mia Jalkerud	9
2012	Damallsvenskan	22	6	1	15	21	55	19	11th	R4				Jessica Landström	6
2013	Elitettan	26	8	6	12	36	49	30	9th	R2				Alexandra Höglund	16
2014	Elitettan	26	13	7	6	73	40	46	4th	R2				Mia Jalkerud	26
2015	Elitettan	26	19	4	3	76	15	66	2nd	QF				Mia Jalkerud	30
2016	Damallsvenskan									R1					

== Key ==
- P = Played
- W = Games won
- D = Games drawn
- L = Games lost
- F = Goals for
- A = Goals against
- Pts = Points
- Pos = Final position
- Div 1 = Division 1
- Div 2 = Division 2
- F = Final
- Group = Group stage
- QF = Quarter-finals
- QR1 = First Qualifying Round
- QR2 = Second Qualifying Round
- QR3 = Third Qualifying Round
- QR4 = Fourth Qualifying Round
- RInt = Intermediate Round
- R1 = Round 1
- R2 = Round 2
- R3 = Round 3
- R4 = Round 4
- R5 = Round 5
- R6 = Round 6
- SF = Semi-finals

Champions	Runners-up	Promoted	Relegated
