= List of Tyresö FF seasons =

This is a list of seasons player by the women's team of Tyresö FF, a Swedish football club.

== Summary ==
Champions	Runners-up	Promoted	Relegated

Domestic and international results of Tyresö FF
Season	League										Cup	Europe		League top scorers					
Season	Tier	Division	Pos	P	W	D	L	F	A	Pts	Cup	Europe		1st	Goal	2nd	Goal	3rd	Goal
1993	1	Damallsvenskan	8^{th}	22	7	4	11	33	38	25									
1994	1	Damallsvenskan	6^{th}	22	10	3	9	36	35	33									
1995	1	Damallsvenskan	9^{th}	22	5	1	16	36	64	16									
1996	1	Damallsvenskan	11^{th}	22	1	4	7	27	87	7									
1997	2	Division 1																	
1998	2	Division 1	1^{st}	18	14	2	2	71	19	44									
1999	1	Damallsvenskan	12^{th}	22	3	1	18	30	88	10	R32								
2000	2	Division 1	10^{th}	18	2	0	16	18	88	6									
2001	3	Division 2	4^{th}	18	8	4	6	44	35	28									
2002	3	Division 2	2^{nd}	18	11	4	3	73	19	37	R32								
2003	3	Division 2	2^{nd}	18	11	4	3	60	29	37									
2004	3	Division 2	4^{th}	18	8	3	7	41	42	27									
2005	3	Division 2	9^{th}	18	2	3	13	23	55	9									
2006	4	Division 3	1^{st}																
2007	3	Division 2	1^{st}	18	14	0	4	54	20	42	R16								
2009	2	Division 1	6^{th}	22	9	4	9	36	33	31	R32			(Sweden) Larsson	11	(Bosnia and Herzegovina) Durakovic	8	(Sweden) Egelryd	7
2009	2	Division 1	1^{st}	22	19	3	0	66	12	60				(Sweden) Klinga	13	(Sweden) Stålhammar	11	(Sweden) Egelryd	10
2010	1	Damallsvenskan	4^{th}	22	12	4	6	41	26	40	R16			(Netherlands) van de Ven	13	(Sweden) Edlund	5	(Sweden) Persson ^{N}	3
2011	1	Damallsvenskan	4^{th}	22	13	4	5	49	20	43	RU			(Sweden) Edlund	15	(Netherlands) van de Ven ^{N}	7	(Sweden) Öqvist	7
2012	1	Damallsvenskan	1^{st}	22	18	1	3	65	12	55	RU			(Brazil) Marta ^{N}	12	(Sweden) Edlund	12	(Netherlands) van de Ven	10
2013	1	Damallsvenskan	2^{nd}	22	14	6	2	71	24	48	QF	UWCL	RU	(United States) Press	23	(Brazil) Marta	12	(Netherlands) van de Ven	9
2014	1	Damallsvenskan	W/o	7	3	1	3	9	9	0									
2015	4	Division 2	5^{th}	18	8	3	7	40	28	27									
2016	4	Division 2	1^{st}	18	17	0	1	83	21	51									
2017	3	Division 1	5^{th}	22	10	4	8	48	34	34									
2018	3	Division 1	3^{rd}	22	15	3	4	69	29	48									
2019	3	Division 1	4^{th}	22	13	5	4	63	36	44									
2020	3	Division 1	2^{nd}	11	9	1	1	37	10	28									
2021	3	Division 1	4^{th}	22	14	4	4	70	32	46									
2022	3	Division 1	3^{rd}	22	15	3	4	57	20	48									
