= Malin Allberg =

Swedish footballer

Personal information
- Full name: Malin Eva Helena Allberg
- Date of birth: 1 March 1972 (age 54)
- Place of birth: Stockholm, Sweden
- Position: Forward

Senior career*
Years	Team	Apps	(Gls)
1988	IF Brommapojkarna	18	(14)
1989–1990	AIK		
1991–1992	Djurgårdens IF	19	(5)
1993–1996	Hammarby IF	65	(37)
1997–2000	Älvsjö AIK		

International career
1995–1998	Sweden	20	(3)
- * Club domestic league appearances and goals

Malin Eva Helena Allberg (born 1 March 1972) is a Swedish former footballer who played as a forward for the Sweden national team.

== Club career ==
Allberg started playing youth football with local club Vällingby AIK. In 1988, she made her debut in senior football for IF Brommapojkarna in Division 2, Sweden's third tier at the time, scoring 14 goals in 18 games. She missed the whole 1989 season due to an injury. In 1990, Allberg represented AIK in Division 1, the second division.

In 1991, she signed with Djurgårdens IF in Damallsvenskan. The following season, in 1992, she scored five goals in 19 games, although Djurgården finished 11th in the table and suffered a relegation from the top tier.

In 1993, Allberg joined Hammarby IF, where she became a key player for four seasons scoring 37 goals in 65 league appearances. Led by player-coach Pia Sundhage in 1994, Hammarby finished as runner-up in Damallsvenskan, but won Svenska Cupen through a 2–1 win against Gideonsbergs IF in the final. In 1995, Hammarby defended its cup title through a 1–0 final win against Älvsjö AIK.

In 1997, Allberg joined Älvsjö AIK in Damallsvenskan, where she played until 2000 when she was forced to retire due to a knee injury. During her stint at the club, she won three consecutive Swedish championship titles in 1997, 1998 and 1998. She also won Svenska Cupen with Älvsjö in 1999, through a 2–1 win in extra time against Djurgården in the final.

== International career ==
From her debut in 1995, Allberg won 20 caps for Sweden, scoring three goals. She was part of the squad that reached the semifinal in the UEFA Women's Euro 1997, losing 0–1 to Germany. In 1998, Allberg was given the honorary award Stora Tjejers Märke, the "Big Girls' Badge", by the Swedish Football Association.

== Honours ==
Hammarby IF

- Svenska Cupen: Winner 1994, 1995

Älvsjö AIK

- Damallsvenskan: Winner 1997, 1998, 1999
- Svenska Cupen: Winner 1999
