= Kristine Minde =

Norwegian footballer (born 1992)

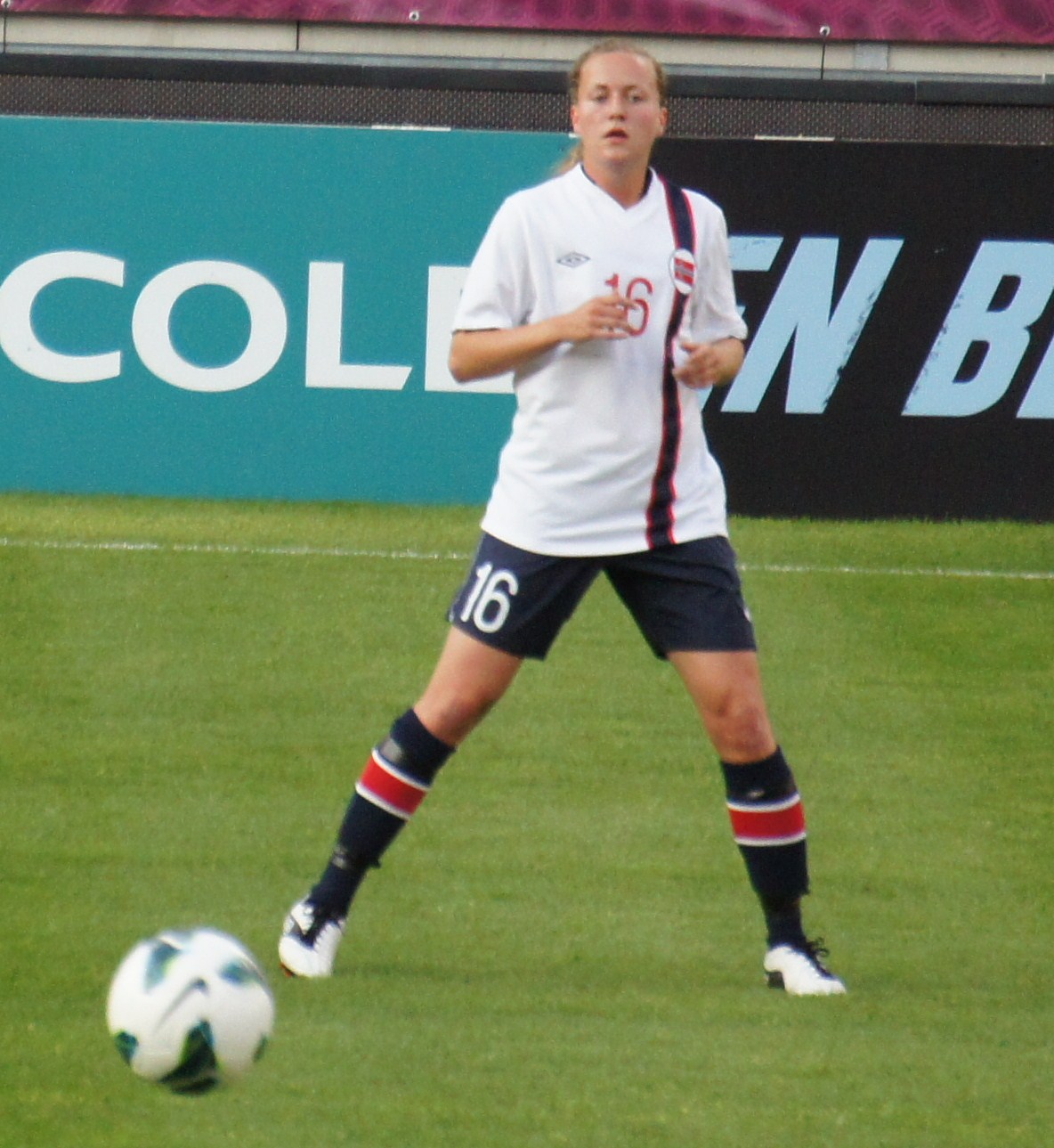
- Kristine Minde in 2013

Personal information
- Birth name: Kristine Wigdahl Hegland
- Date of birth: 8 August 1992 (age 34)
- Place of birth: Bergen, Norway
- Height: 1.69 m (5 ft 7 in)
- Position: Winger

Youth career
- Tertnes

Senior career*
| Years | Team | Apps | (Gls) |
| 2008–2013 | Arna-Bjørnar | 121 | (27) |
| 2014–2017 | Linköpings FC | 82 | (27) |
| 2018–2020 | VfL Wolfsburg | 24 | (6) |
| 2020–2026 | Rosenborg | 48 | (1) |

International career^{‡}
| 2006–2007 | Norway U15 | 2 | (1) |
| 2008 | Norway U16 | 6 | (4) |
| 2007–2008 | Norway U17 | 16 | (2) |
| 2008–2011 | Norway U19 | 40 | (15) |
| 2008–2012 | Norway U20 | 12 | (0) |
| 2010 | Norway U23 | 3 | (0) |
| 2011–2020 | Norway | 108 | (9) |
Medal record
Women's football
Representing Norway
UEFA Women's Championship
| Silver medal – second place | 2013 Sweden | Team |
- * Club domestic league appearances and goals as of 8 October 2022 ‡ National team caps and goals as of 22 September 2020

Kristine Minde (née Wigdahl Hegland; born 8 August 1992) is a Norwegian former footballer who played as a winger. She has represented the Norway women's national football team since 2011 and featured at the 2011 and 2015 FIFA Women's World Cups, as well as UEFA Women's Euro 2013.

== Personal life ==
In November 2013, she got married and took her husband's name, becoming Kristine Minde.

== Club career ==
Born in Bergen, Minde joined Arna-Bjørnar as a 14-year-old and developed into an important player at the club. After playing for Norway in UEFA Women's Euro 2013 she became a transfer target for bigger teams in Sweden and Germany. She was sold to Linköpings ahead of the 2014 Damallsvenskan season. Arna-Bjørnar did not reveal the size of the transfer fee, but said the extra income would come in handy.

In June 2020, she signed a 2-year contract with Norwegian Rosenborg BK, valid from 1 August 2020.

== Honours ==
Linköpings FC

Winner

- Damallsvenskan: 2016, 2017
- Svenska Cupen (1): 2014–15

Runner-up

- Svenska Supercupen: 2015

Rosenborg

- Norwegian Cup: 2023

== Career statistics ==
As of 11 October 2020

| Club | Season | Division | League | | Cup^{1} | | Continental^{2} | | Total | |
| Club | Season | Division | Apps | Goals | Apps | Goals | Apps | Goals | Apps | Goals |
|---|---|---|---|---|---|---|---|---|---|---|
| Arna-Bjørnar | 2008 | Toppserien | 21 | 2 | 0 | 0 | - | | 21 | 2 |
| Arna-Bjørnar | 2009 | Toppserien | 14 | 6 | 0 | 0 | - | | 14 | 6 |
| Arna-Bjørnar | 2010 | Toppserien | 22 | 3 | 0 | 0 | - | | 22 | 3 |
| Arna-Bjørnar | 2011 | Toppserien | 21 | 6 | 1 | 0 | - | | 22 | 6 |
| Arna-Bjørnar | 2012 | Toppserien | 21 | 5 | 4 | 0 | - | | 25 | 5 |
| Arna-Bjørnar | 2013 | Toppserien | 22 | 5 | 3 | 2 | - | | 25 | 7 |
| Arna-Bjørnar | Total | | 121 | 27 | 8 | 2 | - | - | 129 | 29 |
| Linköpin | 2014 | Damallsvenskan | 21 | 5 | 4 | 2 | 4 | 1 | 29 | 8 |
| Linköpin | 2015 | Damallsvenskan | 21 | 4 | 5 | 1 | 2 | 0 | 28 | 5 |
| Linköpin | 2016 | Damallsvenskan | 22 | 11 | 5 | 0 | - | | 27 | 11 |
| Linköpin | 2017 | Damallsvenskan | 18 | 7 | 4 | 2 | - | | 22 | 9 |
| Linköpin | Total | | 82 | 27 | 18 | 5 | 6 | 1 | 106 | 33 |
| Wolfsburg | 2017–18 | Frauen-Bundesliga | 5 | 0 | 2 | 0 | - | | 7 | 0 |
| Wolfsburg | 2018–19 | Frauen-Bundesliga | 11 | 6 | 2 | 0 | 4 | 1 | 17 | 7 |
| Wolfsburg | 2019–20 | Frauen-Bundesliga | 8 | 0 | 3 | 0 | 2 | 1 | 13 | 1 |
| Wolfsburg | Total | | 24 | 6 | 7 | 0 | 6 | 2 | 37 | 8 |
| Rosenborg | 2020 | Toppserien | 12 | 0 | 1 | 1 | - | | 13 | 1 |
| Rosenborg | Total | | 12 | 0 | 1 | 1 | - | | 13 | 1 |
| Career total | | | 239 | 60 | 34 | 8 | 12 | 3 | 285 | 71 |

== International career ==
At youth level Minde was captain of Norway's under-19 national team and played at the 2008 FIFA U-20 Women's World Cup.

Uncapped Minde was a late call-up to the Norway squad for the 2011 FIFA Women's World Cup, following Lisa-Marie Woods' withdrawal with a hip injury. She made her debut at the tournament, in Norway's final group match; a 2–1 defeat by Australia.

National coach Even Pellerud named Minde in his squad for the 2013 European Championships in Sweden. In Norway's opening fixture, Minde put her team ahead against Iceland, only for Margrét Lára Viðarsdóttir to equalise with a late penalty kick. Minde played 120 minutes in the semi-final victory over Denmark and 90 minutes in the final against Germany, as Norway finished with silver medals.

She made her 100th appearance for Norway on 17 June 2019, during the 2019 FIFA Women's World Cup.

== See also ==
- List of women's footballers with 100 or more international caps
