= 1993 Damallsvenskan =

Swedish football league season

The 1993 Damallsvenskan was the sixth season of the Damallsvenskan. Matches were played between 24 April and 23 October 1993. Malmö FF won the title by four points from Jitex BK/JG93. Gideonsbergs IF finished third. Jitex BK/JG 93 were formed from Jitex and GAIS' women's football team. As a result of Jitex and GAIS forming one team, three teams were promoted instead of two. The three teams were AIK, Mallbackens IF and Tyresö FF. Mallbacken were relegated again, along with Lindsdals IF.

== Rankings ==
Pos	Team	Pld	W	D	L	GF	GA	GD	Pts	Qualification or relegation
1	Malmö FF (C)	22	14	7	1	56	25	+31	49	Champions
2	Jitex BK/JG93	22	15	2	5	60	28	+32	47	
3	Gideonsbergs IF (M)	22	14	4	4	61	22	+39	46	
4	Älvsjö AIK	22	14	1	7	56	38	+18	43	
5	Öxabäck/Mark IF	22	9	6	7	57	47	+10	33	
6	Hammarby IF	22	9	4	9	43	41	+2	31	
7	Sunnanå SK	22	8	5	9	29	34	−5	29	
8	Tyresö FF (N)	22	7	4	11	33	38	−5	25	
9	AIK (N)	22	7	2	13	22	37	−15	23	
10	Wä IF	22	6	4	12	24	57	−33	22	
11	Mallbackens IF (R, N)	22	3	3	16	24	56	−32	12	Relegated
12	Lindsdals IF (R)	22	2	6	14	16	58	−42	12	Relegated

Source: aik.se
(C) Champions; (M) Defending champions; (N) Newly promoted to the competition before the season; (R) Relegated
