= Matilda Forslund =

Swedish football midfielder

Personal information
- Full name: Ann Matilda Forslund
- Date of birth: 9 November 1989 (age 36)
- Place of birth: Sweden
- Height: 1.63 m (5 ft 4 in)
- Position: Midfielder

Youth career
- Sunnanå
- Morön BK

Senior career*
Years	Team	Apps	(Gls)
- Umeå Södra
2008–2010	Sunnanå	39	(1)
2012	Hammarby IF		
- * Club domestic league appearances and goals

Ann Matilda Forslund (born 9 November 1989) is a Swedish football midfielder, who most recently played for Hammarby IF in Division 1. She previously played for Sunnanå SK in the Damallsvenskan.

In October 2010 she was sanctioned for terminating unilaterally her contract with Sunnanå to sign for Spanish side Levante UD.
