= 1992 Damallsvenskan =

Swedish football league season

The 1992 Damallsvenskan was the fifth season of the Damallsvenskan. Matches were played between 17 April and 3 October 1992. Öxabäck/Mark IF won the league by one point from Gideonsbergs IF. Malmö FF finished third. In the playoffs, Gideonsbergs IF won the title. This was the only time that the Damallsvenskan and the playoffs had different winners.

The two teams promoted before the season were Lindsdals IF and Älvsjö AIK. The relegated teams were Djurgården and Sundsvall DFF.

== Table ==
Pos	Team	Pld	W	D	L	GF	GA	GD	Pts	Qualification or relegation
1	Öxabäck/Mark IF (Q)	22	17	3	2	78	28	+50	54	Qualified for playoffs
2	Gideonsbergs IF (Q)	22	17	2	3	86	24	+62	53	Qualified for playoffs
3	Malmö FF (Q, M)	22	14	4	4	56	27	+29	46	Qualified for playoffs
4	Älvsjö AIK (Q, N)	22	13	3	6	53	27	+26	42	Qualified for playoffs
5	Jitex BK	22	9	3	10	53	54	−1	30	
6	Hammarby	22	8	5	9	47	44	+3	29	
7	Wä IF	22	8	4	10	36	44	−8	28	
8	Sunnanå SK	22	8	2	12	28	52	−24	26	
9	Lindsdals IF (N)	22	6	5	11	28	51	−23	23	
10	GAIS	22	5	6	11	31	47	−16	21	
11	Djurgården (R)	22	4	2	16	24	85	−61	14	Relegated
12	Sundsvalls FF (R)	22	2	3	17	25	62	−37	9	Relegated

(M) Defending champions; (N) Newly promoted to the competition before the season; (Q) Qualified for the phase indicated; (R) Relegated

== Playoffs ==
Results of the playoffs are not known. The champions were Gideonsbergs IF.
