= 1997 Damallsvenskan =

Swedish women's association football season

The 1997 Damallsvenskan was the tenth season of the Damallsvenskan. Matches were played between 19 April and 25 October 1997. Älvsjö AIK won the title for the third consecutive year, by six points from Malmö FF. Bälinge IF finished third.

Before the season, Djurgården, Lotorps IF and Östers IF were promoted. At the end of the season, the last two teams, as well as Jitex BK, were relegated.

== Table ==
Pos	Team	Pld	W	D	L	GF	GA	GD	Pts	Qualification or relegation
1	Älvsjö AIK (C, M)	22	16	4	2	47	13	+34	52	Champions
2	Malmö FF	22	14	4	4	72	29	+43	46	
3	Bälinge IF	22	13	4	5	58	24	+34	43	
4	Sunnanå SK	22	11	7	4	48	25	+23	40	
5	Hammarby	22	10	6	6	44	30	+14	36	
6	Djurgården (N)	22	10	5	7	51	37	+14	35	
7	Gideonsbergs IF	22	9	4	9	35	41	−6	31	
8	Landvetter IF	22	8	1	13	32	55	−23	25	
9	Öxabäck/Mark IF	22	6	4	12	37	60	−23	22	
10	Lotorps IF (R, N)	22	5	3	14	28	55	−27	18	Relegated
11	Östers IF (R, N)	22	4	2	16	30	62	−32	14	Relegated
12	Jitex BK/JG93 (R)	22	3	2	17	22	73	−51	11	Relegated

Source: RSSSF
(C) Champions; (M) Defending champions; (N) Newly promoted; (R) Relegated
