= Manon Melis =

Dutch footballer and manager (born 1986)

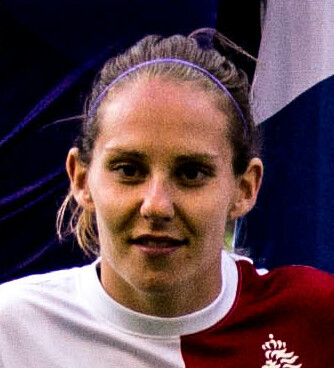
- Manon with Netherlands in 2014

Personal information
- Full name: Gabriëlla Maria Melis
- Date of birth: 31 August 1986 (age 40)
- Place of birth: Rotterdam, Netherlands
- Height: 1.64 m (5 ft 5 in)
- Position: Forward

Youth career
- –2004: RVVH

Senior career*
| Years | Team | Apps | (Gls) |
| 2004–2006 | RVVH | | |
| 2006–2007 | Be Quick '28 | | |
| 2007–2011 | LdB FC Malmö | 103 | (84) |
| 2011–2012 | Sky Blue FC | 0 | (0) |
| 2012 | Linköpings FC | 21 | (16) |
| 2013 | LdB FC Malmö | 21 | (11) |
| 2014–2015 | Kopparbergs/Göteborg FC | 42 | (25) |
| 2016 | Seattle Reign FC | 16 | (7) |

International career
| 2001–2002 | Netherlands U17 | 9 | (3) |
| 2003–2004 | Netherlands U19 | 21 | (13) |
| 2004–2016 | Netherlands | 136 | (59) |
- * Club domestic league appearances and goals

Gabriëlla Maria "Manon" (Note: In Dutch culture it is not unusual to have an official name and an unofficial name (call name), sometimes already announced by the parents at birth. The unofficial name is often a derivative of one of the official names, but does not need to be.) Melis (Dutch pronunciation: [ɣaːbriˈjɛlaː maːˈrijaː maːˈnɔ ˈmeːlɪs]; (Note: In isolation, Manon is pronounced [maːˈnɔn].) born 31 August 1986) is a Dutch manager of women's football development at Feyenoord and a former professional footballer who played as a forward. She spent most of her professional career playing in the Swedish league Damallsvenskan, which she won three times with her club LdB FC Malmö, in 2010, 2011, and 2013. Melis also won the Swedish Supercup with Malmö in 2011, and was briefly with the Swedish teams Linköping and Göteborg. She was the Damallsvenskan top scorer three times, in 2008, 2010, and 2011. In 2016, she moved to the National Women's Soccer League (NWSL) in the US, playing for Seattle Reign for one season, before retiring from professional football.

At age 17, Melis made her debut for the Netherlands national team in 2004. Her scoring helped the Dutch qualify for their first major tournament, the UEFA Women's Euro 2009, where they reached the semi-finals. In the tournament, she scored a crucial goal in the final group game against Denmark to send her team into the knockout stage. At Euro 2013 in Sweden and the 2015 FIFA Women's World Cup in Canada, she played all seven combined matches for her country but did not score. When she retired from playing international football in 2016, she had earned 136 caps and scored 59 goals. She was the all-time top goal scorer for the Netherlands national team from 2010 to 2019.

Melis has been the manager of women's football development at Feyenoord since 2017 with the aim to create a first team that competes in the Dutch Eredivisie and is supported by youth and reserve teams. She achieved this goal when Feyenoord Women fielded a team in the Eredivisie for the first time in the 2021–22 season. Her father is former Feyenoord player Harry Melis.

== Early life ==
Gabriëlla Maria Melis was born on 31 August 1986 in Rotterdam. Her father is Harry Melis, a former footballer who played as a winger in the Dutch Eredivisie for Feyenoord, ADO Den Haag, and DS'79. At a young age, she expressed her desire to follow in his example. She started playing organised football in 1993 for RVVH in Ridderkerk, where she initially played in the girls' team. The Royal Dutch Football Association soon suggested that Melis play with and against boys, a scheme the association had introduced in 1986. She enjoyed the more challenging environment up to the highest youth teams. Girls playing football was still somewhat unusual at the time and she later said that her direct opponents were often ridiculed by their teammates for having to compete against a girl. Melis later said that most of her teammates on the senior national team had played on boys' teams in their youth.

During her childhood, Melis appeared as a ball girl during a national team match at the Sparta Stadion Het Kasteel. She supported Feyenoord, one of her father's clubs, from an early age and has said that Giovanni van Bronckhorst and Henrik Larsson were her favourite players during her youth.

== Club career ==
=== 2004–2006: RVVH ===
After turning 18 in 2004, Melis moved to the senior level. She continued to play for RVVH but was no longer allowed to play on mixed teams and had to switch to the club's women's team. She was joined by Leonne Stentler, who had also played for RVVH's mixed youth teams. Stentler, who went on to earn 16 caps for the Dutch national team, later said that the drop in level had negatively affected their motivation. Other internationals at the club were Jeanine van Dalen and Sandra Muller. For two seasons she played in the Hoofdklasse, the Netherlands' highest amateur league of women's football. There was no professional league in the Netherlands at the time. The women had to arrange their own travel to away games; unlike for the men, the club did not organise transport for them. RVVH did not win the league during Melis's tenure.

=== 2006–2007: Be Quick '28 ===
In 2006, Melis received an offer to play in the German Frauen-Bundesliga, for Duisburg, but declined. She wished to focus fully on football, but this offer meant that she would also have to find other work, which seemed daunting because she was unable to speak German fluently. She decided to stay in the highest Dutch league and accept an offer from Be Quick '28 in Zwolle, because of their more intensive training regime. She joined Sylvia Smit, with whom she had played on the national team, in attack. Melis only played for Be Quick for a few months.

=== 2007–2011: LdB FC Malmö ===
In January 2007, at age 20, Melis moved abroad to play professionally for LdB FC Malmö in the Swedish Damallsvenskan. She later recalled that the women's game was far more advanced in Sweden than in the Netherlands, both in terms of professionalism, exemplified by the frequency and intensity of training, and media coverage. Malmö had finished in fourth place in the twelve-team league the previous season and signed her to challenge defending champions Umeå IK. Among the other players on the team were Ásthildur Helgadóttir, an Iceland international, and Caroline Jönsson, Sweden's goalkeeper. In Melis's first home game, against Örebro in front of 1,013 spectators, she scored twice. In her first season she scored ten goals, and finished as the club's top scorer, ahead of Helgadóttir, but her tally was surpassed by Lotta Schelin of Kopparbergs/Göteborg FC who scored 26. Malmö finished third as Umeå retained the championship.

In her second season at Malmö, Melis scored the first equalising goal in a 2–2 draw with Umeå, who ended up winning the league again, their fourth consecutive title. Malmö finished the season third, but having closed the gap with Umeå they had in Melis's first season. Melis, playing in the number 14 jersey, was the league's joint-top-scorer that season with Umeå's Marta, each of them scoring 23 times, although 6 of Marta's goals were scored on the last day of the season in an 11–1 win over already-relegated Bälinge. In November 2008, Melis was nominated for the Forward of the Year award at the annual Swedish Football Gala but she lost to Marta.

In the 2009 season Melis played 20 games, scoring 10 goals. She shared the club's top scorer spot with Frida Nordin. Early in the season Malmö scored seven goals three games in a row, with Melis scoring a hat-trick in one of them, against Piteå. They finished the season in fourth place, as Linköping took the title.

In Melis's fourth season at Malmö the club won the league, thus securing a place in the 2011–12 UEFA Women's Champions League. She surpassed her 2008-goal tally of 23 by scoring 25 goals in 22 games and was the 2010 Damallsvenskan top scorer. Malmö finished 11 points ahead of the second-place team Göteborg. Melis scored hat-tricks in two matches: in the 5–3 victory over Göteborg early in the season, and in the 4–0 away win over Umeå in June. She also scored the opening goal in a 2–1 win over defending champions Linköping. In the final game of the season Melis scored twice in a 5–0 victory over Umeå. In November 2010, Melis won the awards for Forward of the Year and Most Valuable Player in the Damallsvenskan. In their description of the history of Damallsvenskan, the Swedish Football Association wrote that the 2010 season saw some stars leaving the league and, consequently, audience numbers declined, prompting a decrease in sponsor funds needed to attract new stars.

In her first Supercup, held just prior to the start of the 2011 Damallsvenskan season between league champions Malmö and cup winners Örebro, Melis scored the winning goal in extra time. It was a simple tap-in goal after a Sarah Storck shot rebounded off the crossbar. This Supercup win was followed by Melis being part of Malmö successfully defending their title. With three games to play Melis scored the winning goal in a 2–1 victory over Kristianstad, keeping Malmö close to league leaders Tyresö and rivals Göteborg and Umeå. Tyresö lost their last two games, whereas Malmö won both, staying ahead of Göteborg by one point. In the domestic cup, Malmö again lost in the quarter-finals. Despite Melis's opening goal putting Malmö in the lead before half-time, Linköping came from behind to win 2–1. Melis finished the season as Damallsvenskan's top scorer, with 16 goals from 21 games, sharing the honour with Kristianstad's Margrét Lára Viðarsdóttir. She has been Malmö's top scorer for five straight seasons. Melis played her first ever Champions League game on 29 September 2011 in Italy against Tavagnacco, losing 2–1 in the first leg of a two-legged tie. In the return game she scored twice to help secure a 5–0 win and progress to the next round, where they faced SV Neulengbach from Austria. Melis scored once in the away game, helping her club to a 3–1 win. The return match, on 10 November 2011, was her last game with the club. Melis scored the only goal of the match. As a result, Malmö progressed to the quarter-finals, scheduled for March 2012 after Melis left the team.

=== 2011–2012: Sky Blue FC ===
In November 2011, Melis announced she was moving from Malmö to Sky Blue FC, based in Harrison, New Jersey, to play in the American Women's Professional Soccer (WPS) league. Sky Blue FC head coach Jim Gabarra said that because the WPS defences were quick and physical he needed a fast forward player like Melis. Daphne Koster, with whom Melis played for the Dutch national team, played for Sky Blue the year before. Before Melis could start her first game for Sky Blue, the WPS suspended operations in January 2012 because of a legal dispute with an ousted owner. This left many players, including Melis, in need of a new club.

=== 2012: Linköpings FC ===
In February 2012, Melis returned to the Damallsvenskan and signed with Linköping, ahead of the 2012 season starting in April. Coach Jörgen Petersson called her "a strong addition to an already very interesting player squad". Her colleague in attack was the Australian Lisa De Vanna. Reflecting on her years of experience in the Swedish league Melis said, "I think the league is more equal and harder than previous years. There are so many internationals and good players in the league." She was assigned the number 9 jersey. The club did not start the season well, winning two of the first eight games, but she scored all four of her side's goals in their 4–1 victory over Piteå. She also scored four times in Linköping's 11–0 defeat of Djurgården. In June she faced her old club Malmö at the Malmö IP stadium, where she scored the game's opening goal in a 2–1 defeat. In August, she scored once in the home match against Malmö, who won 5–3, with their German international Anja Mittag scoring a hat-trick. Linköping finished third in the league, 16 points behind title-winners Tyresö. Melis scored 16 goals in 21 games, finishing third on the top scorers list behind Mittag and Göteborg's Christen Press.

=== 2013: LdB FC Malmö ===
Melis agreed to return to Malmö in December 2012 for the 2013 Damallsvenskan season, regaining her number 14 jersey and joining Mittag in attack. In the home game against her former club, Linköping, Melis scored the second goal of a 4–0 victory, on an assist from Sara Björk Gunnarsdóttir. The away match at defending champions Tyresö was a turning point for the club's season. Although Malmö were behind 2–1, and had a player sent off with about 20 minutes to go, they achieved a 3–2 win. In her last home game at the Malmö IP stadium, against old rivals Umeå, Melis scored the opening goal in front of more than 2,500 spectators; Malmö won 2–0. Melis collected her third Damallsvenskan winner's medal, as her team finished seven points ahead of second-placed Tyresö. She scored 11 goals in 21 league matches, two goals fewer than her teammate Mittag and twelve fewer than the league's top scorer, Press.

=== 2014–2015: Kopparbergs/Göteborg FC ===
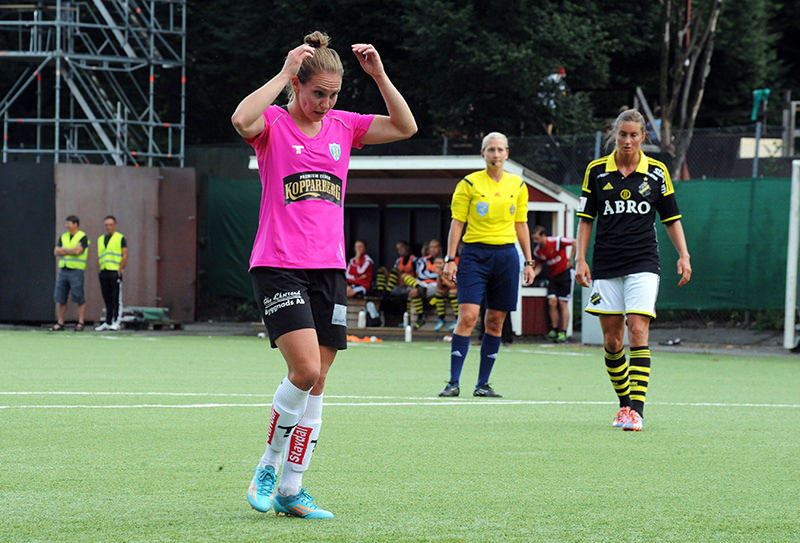
Melis playing for Kopparbergs/Göteborg FC in 2014

Although Melis wanted to stay at Malmö, when Göteborg in November 2013 came in with an offer she decided to accept it for financial reasons. Göteborg had seen several key players depart, notably midfielders Yael Averbuch, Marie Hammarström, Anita Asante and Johanna Almgren, and needed to invest in players to compete for the title again. The club's subsequent signings included Dutch internationals Lieke Martens and Loes Geurts. Göteborg started the 2014 Damallsvenskan season with a 5–0 away win over Vittsjö GIK; Melis scored a hat-trick, including two goals on assists from long-term Göteborg player Sara Lindén. Coach Stefan Rehn said that the team benefitted from Melis and Martens's many years of experience together on the Netherlands national team. In the 4–0 win over Jitex BK in July 2014, Melis scored all four goals in the first 20 minutes. In the penultimate game of the season, with Rosengård (Malmö's new name after merging with FC Rosengård 1917) already title winners, Göteborg lost second place to Örebro as a result of a 3–2 defeat at Kristianstad, despite Melis scoring twice. Melis ended the season in second place on the top scorers' list with 16 goals, behind Mittag, who scored 23. The two foreigners shared the honours for most assists in the season with 11.

In Melis's final season in Sweden, the 2015 Damallsvenskan, Göteborg achieved a sixth-place finish, as her former club Rosengård won the title again. In October 2015, she played her last match in Sweden, a home game against Örebro, with 373 spectators. The club's fourth Dutch international, Daniëlle van de Donk, opened the scoring early on with an assist by Melis, but the away team won the game 4–2. Melis ranked sixth on the top scorers list, scoring 9 goals, more than any of her teammates; leader Gaëlle Enganamouit of Eskilstuna scored 18. At the end of the season, she considered retirement from professional football.

=== 2016: Seattle Reign FC ===
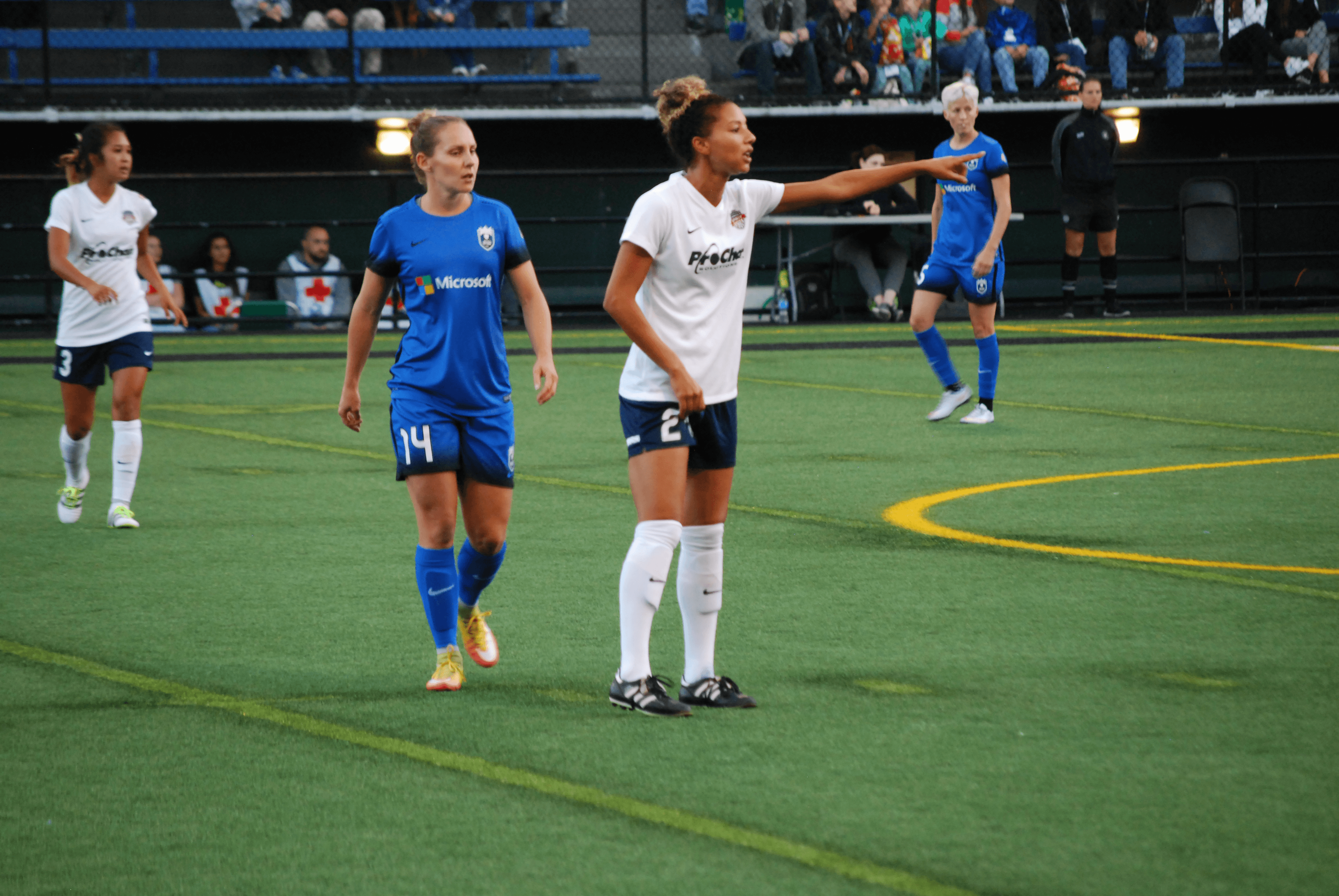
Melis (centre, 14) with Estelle Johnson during Seattle Reign FC vs Washington Spirit

In November 2015, Melis signed a one-year contract with Seattle Reign FC in the American National Women's Soccer League for the 2016 season, and was assigned the number 14 jersey, stating that it was a dream come true to play in the US. Of her signing, Seattle's head coach Laura Harvey said, "Manon is a fantastic talent who will bring something new to our attack next season. We're thrilled to have a player with her experience and consistent record of success at the highest levels of club and international football join our club next season." Melis was surprised at the popularity of women's football in the US, exemplified by how her teammate Hope Solo had to travel wearing a hoodie and sunglasses to avoid attention. Seattle's season started with a defeat to Melis's former club Sky Blue, ending their streak of 24 undefeated home games, in front of a crowd of 4,000. In the next game, away at Boston Breakers, she scored her first goal in the US, in a 3–0 win. In May, in a game against Portland Thorns FC, she fractured her tibia after a bad landing on the pitch. She joined Rapinoe and Jess Fishlock on Seattle's injury list and missed the following four games. Coming back from injury she scored five goals in five matches. On 25 September 2016, she played the last game of her career, in front of over 5,500 people and scored in the 60th minute to help Seattle to a 3–2 away win over Houston Dash. Seattle finished the season in fifth place, narrowly missing out on a spot in the play-offs. In 16 appearances she scored seven times and was the club's leading scorer that season. In November 2016, Melis announced her retirement from professional football.

== International career ==
=== Debut and early years: 2003–2009 ===
Melis represented the Netherlands at the youth levels, making her debut in the under-17 team in May 2001 and in the Under-19 team in January 2003. In a combined total of 30 games she scored 16 goals for the youth teams. She played her first match for the senior Netherlands women's national football team on 25 April 2004, aged 17, in an away game against Belgium. The Dutch were in the middle of UEFA Women's Euro 2005 qualifying, a double round-robin tournament with four groups. Melis came on at half-time and scored the Netherlands' second goal in a 3–0 win. In the next qualification match, at home against Norway in front of 2,000 fans, she again came on as a substitute, playing for the last three minutes. The Dutch finished qualifying in fourth out of five teams as Denmark and Norway were the only teams to qualify from their group. She appeared in the starting line-up for the first time in her 4th cap, a friendly against England. Only in her 16th cap did she score again, in a friendly in preparation for the 2007 World Cup qualifiers. She did not score in any of the qualifiers and the Dutch again did not qualify, which consequently meant they would not participate in the 2008 Olympics either. Not until almost three years after her debut, in her 34th cap, did she score her third goal for her country, in a 2–0 home win over Italy.

In qualification for the UEFA Women's Euro 2009 the Dutch were drawn in the same group as reigning World Cup champions Germany. The Germans won all eight of their qualifier matches, leaving the Dutch to vie with the Swiss and Belgians for a spot in the play-offs. Melis scored in six of the eight matches, only failing to score against the world champions. In the final qualification game, she scored twice in a 3–0 win over Belgium to ensure the Dutch progressed to the play-offs. They beat Spain 2–0 in both legs of their play-off tie to qualify for a major tournament for the first time in their history. Prior to Euro 2009 the team competed at the Cyprus Cup, where Melis scored four times, twice in their victory over Russia and twice in the match for fifth place against South-Africa, which the Netherlands won 5–0. At the end of the tournament Melis had moved into second position on the all-time top scorer's list of the national team, having scored 17 goals.

At Euro 2009 in Finland, the Dutch were drawn in a group with Ukraine, Denmark, and the hosts, Finland. They started well, with a 2–0 victory over Ukraine. Melis, playing in the number 9 jersey, did not score, but played the whole 90 minutes. The second group match, against Finland in front of a crowd of 15,000, resulted in what the Dutch press called a well-deserved 2–1 loss, meaning elimination or progression depended on the final group game against Denmark. Despite the Danes having more attacking chances and outplaying the Dutch, goals by Smit and Melis sent them through to the quarter-finals with a 2–1 win. Looking back at her career after it ended, Melis singled out this goal as the most special of all her goals for the national team. The quarter-final against the French was scoreless after 90 minutes, mostly due to strong defending by Dutch captain Koster and to French goalkeeper Céline Deville pushing aside a dangerous shot by Melis. In extra time Melis almost scored but her shot just missed the net. A penalty shoot-out was needed to decide the winner. The first eight penalties, including the third, taken by Melis, were all converted. The next five players failed to score. Finally, Anouk Hoogendijk converted her penalty and put the Dutch into the semi-finals against England. In another close game, the Dutch mostly defended. Melis was nearly on the receiving end of a long through ball but it was intercepted by goalkeeper Rachel Brown. England scored first, but the Dutch struck back almost immediately. Melis made room for herself on the right and played across to Marlous Pieëte who equalised. In extra time the English missed several chances before a Jill Scott header gave England a 2–1 win and a place in the final.

=== Mid career: 2010–2013 ===
At the 2010 Cyprus Cup Melis scored in three of the four games, ending up joint top scorer of the tournament with New Zealand's Amber Hearn, both with four goals. The Dutch finished in third place. To qualify for the 2011 FIFA Women's World Cup, Melis and her teammates had to win a group with Norway, Macedonia, Belarus and Slovakia. Norway won the group without losing a game. After a defeat to Norway in their away game, the Netherlands drew the Scandinavians 2–2 at home, with Melis scoring the opening goal. The Dutch failed to qualify and consequently also missed out on the 2012 Olympics, since only the best performing teams at the World Cup would qualify. In the final qualifier game, against Belarus in August 2010, Melis scored twice, her 29th and 30th international goals, which made her the national team's all-time top goalscorer. She overtook Marjoke de Bakker's goal tally of 29, scored between 1979 and 1991.

Early in 2011 Melis scored three times at the Cyprus Cup, which the Dutch finished in second place. She scored four goals in a 6–0 win over Serbia in the opening match of the UEFA Women's Euro 2013 qualifying group matches. A draw and a loss in their two matches against England left the Dutch competing for second place. Eight goals in total by Melis helped her team qualify directly as best runners-up of all groups. Prior to Euro 2013 in Sweden, she described the host country as her second home. Melis was asked by the Swedish media to introduce the Dutch team to the Swedish public in a video clip. In the Dutch media she said that Sweden was more advanced in terms of media coverage of women's football. The draw put the Dutch in a group with reigning champions Germany, Iceland and Norway. Melis played in all three group games. The opening match against Germany ended in a 0–0 draw. The second game, against Norway, finished 1–0 to the Scandinavians. In the final game the Dutch failed to score again, as Iceland defeated them 1–0, with Dagný Brynjarsdóttir scoring Iceland's winning goal. Melis had a chance to score on a rebound when Martens hit the crossbar but failed to do so, thus ending the tournament for the Netherlands.

=== Final years and retirement: 2013–2016 ===
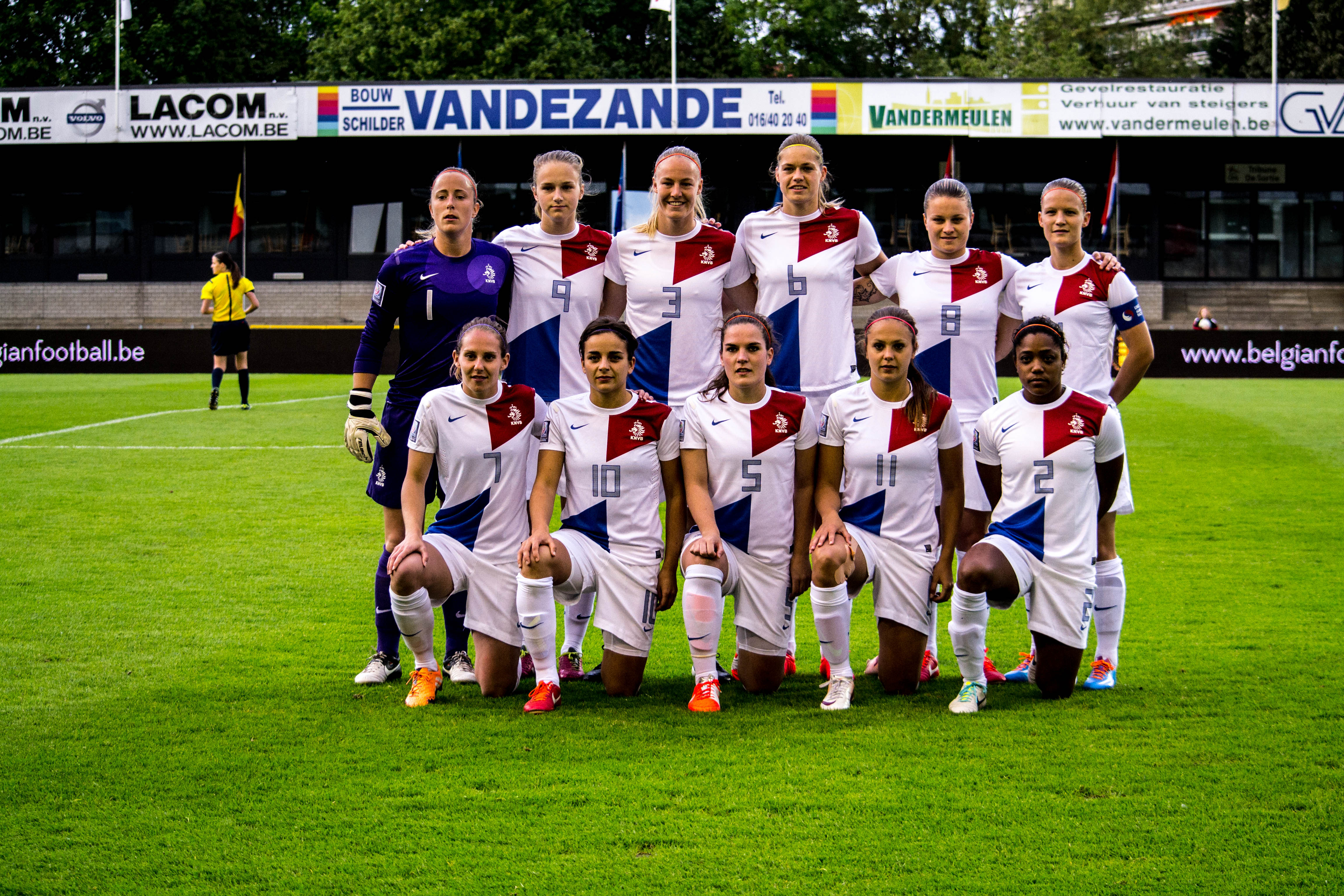
The Netherlands national team in May 2014, with Melis front left

In the opening game of their 2015 World Cup qualification matches, Melis scored a hat-trick in a 4–0 victory over Albania. A loss and a draw in home games with Norway and Belgium respectively put them in third place in the group, but victories in all remaining group matches, against Portugal, Greece, Albania, Belgium and group-winners Norway put them through to the play-offs, with Melis scoring five goals in total. Their opponents in the semi-finals of the play-offs, a two-legged tie, were Scotland. Martens opened the score early on and Melis converted a penalty in the 23rd minute. Kim Little, who later would be Melis's teammate at Seattle, scored for Scotland from the penalty spot as well, but no further goals were scored. In the return leg, Martens and Melis scored again while goalkeeper Geurts kept a clean sheet, sending the Netherlands through to a play-off final against Italy. The first leg ended in a 1–1 draw, the second in a 2–1 victory for the Netherlands, which meant they qualified for their first World Cup tournament. Melis later said they had made history with this qualification, which was one of the highlights of her career.

The Dutch had a good start with their group games at the 2015 World Cup in Canada. They defeated New Zealand 1–0; Martens, Melis's teammate at Göteborg, scored the only goal. In the next game China started defensively, and despite a few attempts by Melis, kept the Netherlands from scoring before making the winning goal in injury time. In the final group game, hosts Canada led 1–0 for nearly 80 minutes. The Dutch needed a draw to advance. Melis had an opportunity to equalise late on but missed. In the last minutes of the game Kirsten van de Ven scored the equaliser, sending them through to the round of 16. The Dutch started the match against Japan well. Melis had a chance to open the score off a pass from Martens, but could not get a shot in. Soon after, Japan scored and the Netherlands missed chances to equalise as both Vivianne Miedema and Martens failed to connect with a Melis pass. In the second half, Japan scored on the counter, and although van de Ven scored after a mistake by Japanese goalkeeper Ayumi Kaihori, the game ended 2–1 for Japan, who would later make it to the final. Melis did not score at the World Cup.

In March 2016, the Dutch played the final game of their qualifying tournament for the 2016 Olympics, against Sweden. Miedema scored after five minutes from a pass by Melis. After Melis missed a chance, Sweden equalised and qualified for the Olympics. Melis said the Dutch team were still too inconsistent. She was disappointed that the young team would miss the opportunity to gain experience from playing the world's best. On 29 March 2016, Melis announced her retirement from international play to focus fully on her club football in the US league. She had earned 136 caps and scored 59 goals. In November 2016, she retired from professional football altogether. A few days later she performed the draw for the Euro 2017, to be held in the Netherlands. The Dutch went on to win the title without her.

For nearly nine years Melis held the all-time goal-scoring record, until 15 June 2019, when Miedema surpassed Melis by scoring her 60th goal in a 3–1 win over Cameroon at a group stage match at the World Cup tournament in France. As of July 2023, Melis ranked third on the all-time goal scoring list for the Netherlands women's football team.

== Managerial career ==
After her playing career, Melis started working for Feyenoord, initially doing social outreach for the Feyenoord Foundation and training young girls for the Feyenoord Soccer Schools. In 2017, she was appointed Feyenoord's manager of women's football development. In 2013, she had expressed her wish for Feyenoord to have a professional team so that she could play for them. In interviews throughout her playing career she stressed the importance of the national team doing well for the development of Dutch women's football in general, for "local competition, financially, sponsors, and everything". While it was somewhat unusual for her as a girl in the 1990s to play football, that was no longer true for Dutch girls towards the end of her career. She said that the Dutch team's successful Euro 2017 in the Netherlands had been pivotal for the development of the women's game in the country. She was tasked by Feyenoord with building a girls' football academy for all age groups. By 2019, Feyenoord had set up girls' teams competing in the under 13, under 15, and under 17 leagues, as well as a reserve team in the newly established women's reserve league. In 2019, she spoke publicly of her desire to bring Vivianne Miedema to Feyenoord in the future, given that Miedema is a Feyenoord fan. Melis confirmed in March 2021 that Feyenoord Women would field a team in the Eredivisie Vrouwen for the first time in the 2021–22 season. On the same day, Miedema expressed the hope to one day join the team. Feyenoord finished their first season in fifth position, and their second in seventh position. As recognition for her "tireless work", the club awarded her the Willem van Hanegem Award.

In December 2023, Melis started taking a Dutch Football Association training course for technical directors.

== Style of play ==
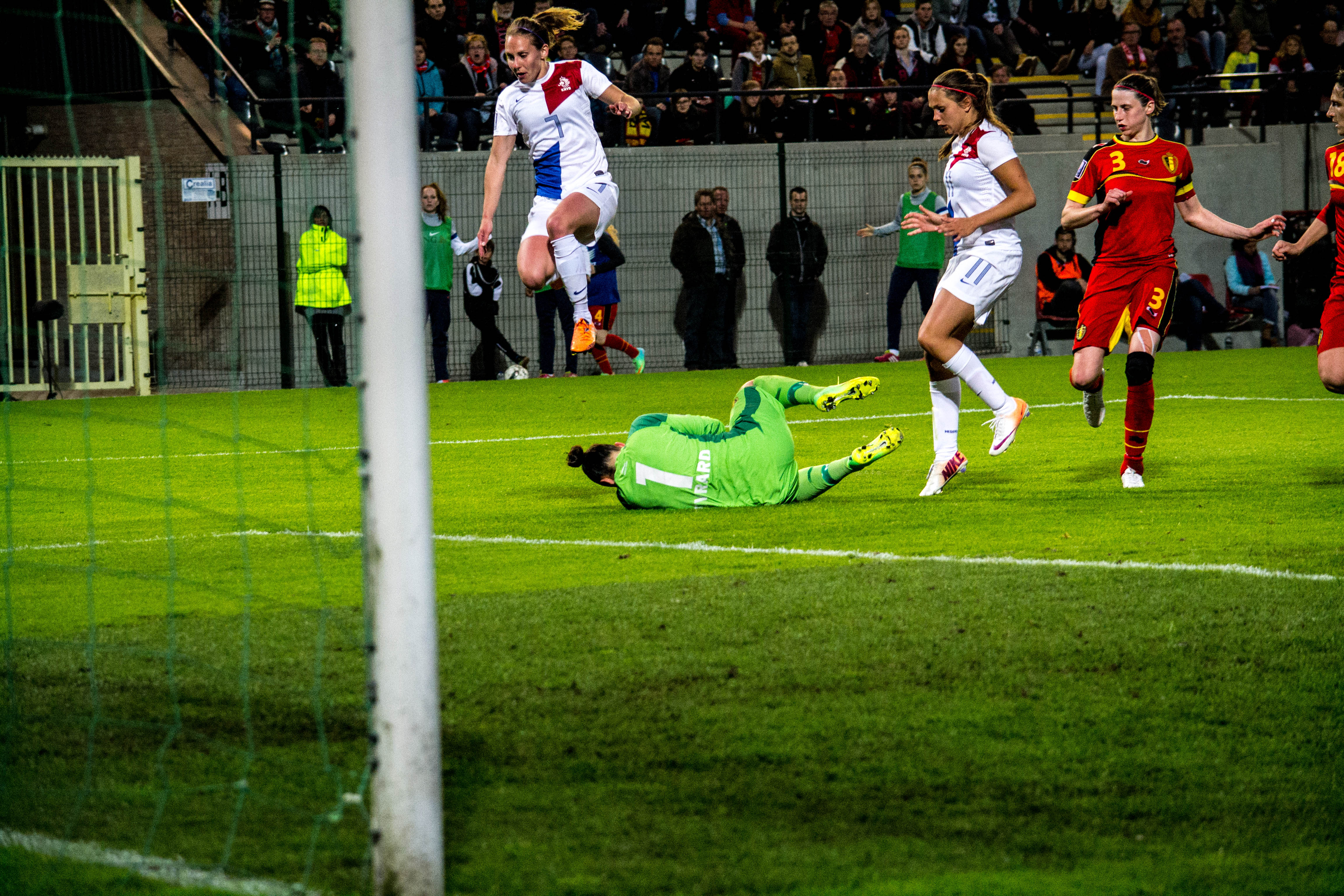
Melis jumps over Belgium's goalkeeper in 2014.

Melis was known for her speed, which earned her the nickname 'The Flying Dutchman' in the US. Her father was also known for his speed. His ex-teammates observed his daughter ran in the same way as he did. She focused more on the differences, stressing that she is a centre forward while he was a winger. Sky Blue assistant coach Emma Hayes noted that apart from being "lightning quick", she was also "technical and with a wonderful eye for goal". Dutch national team coach Arjan van der Laan said Melis was a "superfast" attacker, with excellent goalscoring skills and the ability to set up goals with assists. Martens, her teammate both on the national team and for one season at Göteborg, said Melis had a "killer instinct". Of her goalscoring records Melis has said they seemed more important to others than to her. She was more concerned with winning games and titles.

== Personal life ==
Melis married Dutch professional basketballer Ties Theeuwkens in 2016, prior to the start of her last season. At the announcement of her retirement from professional football, she said that after ten years abroad it was time to return home to be with her husband. Melis is fluent in Swedish.

== Career statistics ==
=== Club ===
Appearances and goals by club, season and competition
| Club | Season | League | | | Cups | | Continental | | Total | |
| Club | Season | Division | Apps | Goals | Apps | Goals | Apps | Goals | Apps | Goals |
|---|---|---|---|---|---|---|---|---|---|---|
| RVVH | 2004–06 | Hoofdklasse | N/A | | N/A | | — | | N/A | |
| Be Quick '28 | 2006–07 | Hoofdklasse | N/A | | N/A | | — | | N/A | |
| LdB FC Malmö | 2007 | Damallsvenskan | 20 | 10 | N/A | | — | | 20 | 10 |
| LdB FC Malmö | 2008 | Damallsvenskan | 20 | 23 | N/A | | — | | 20 | 23 |
| LdB FC Malmö | 2009 | Damallsvenskan | 20 | 10 | 3 | 0 | — | | 23 | 10 |
| LdB FC Malmö | 2010 | Damallsvenskan | 22 | 25 | 3 | 2 | — | | 25 | 27 |
| LdB FC Malmö | 2011 | Damallsvenskan | 21 | 16 | 3 | 3 | 4 | 4 | 28 | 23 |
| LdB FC Malmö | Total | | 103 | 84 | 9 | 5 | 4 | 4 | 116 | 93 |
| Sky Blue FC | 2011 | WPS | — | | — | | — | | — | |
| Linköpings FC | 2012 | Damallsvenskan | 21 | 16 | 1 | 0 | — | | 22 | 16 |
| LdB FC Malmö | 2013 | Damallsvenskan | 21 | 11 | 2 | 3 | 6 | 3 | 29 | 17 |
| Kopparbergs/Göteborg FC | 2014 | Damallsvenskan | 21 | 16 | 2 | 2 | — | | 23 | 18 |
| Kopparbergs/Göteborg FC | 2015 | Damallsvenskan | 21 | 9 | 1 | 0 | — | | 22 | 9 |
| Kopparbergs/Göteborg FC | Total | | 42 | 25 | 3 | 2 | — | | 45 | 27 |
| Seattle Reign FC | 2016 | NWSL | 16 | 7 | — | | — | | 16 | 7 |
| Career total | | | 203 | 143 | 15 | 10 | 10 | 7 | 228 | 160 |

Statistics not available for amateur clubs RVVH and Be Quick '28, and for 2007–08 domestic cup games. Sky Blue FC did not play while Melis was under contract.

=== International ===
During her 12-year international career Melis scored 59 goals from 136 caps.

Appearances and goals by national team and year
| National team | Year | Apps | Goals |
|---|---|---|---|
| Netherlands | 2004 | 7 | 1 |
| Netherlands | 2005 | 11 | 1 |
| Netherlands | 2006 | 15 | 0 |
| Netherlands | 2007 | 8 | 5 |
| Netherlands | 2008 | 6 | 6 |
| Netherlands | 2009 | 16 | 9 |
| Netherlands | 2010 | 8 | 8 |
| Netherlands | 2011 | 12 | 10 |
| Netherlands | 2012 | 10 | 4 |
| Netherlands | 2013 | 11 | 5 |
| Netherlands | 2014 | 14 | 4 |
| Netherlands | 2015 | 13 | 4 |
| Netherlands | 2016 | 5 | 2 |
| Total | | 136 | 59 |

== Honours ==
LdB FC Malmö

- Damallsvenskan: 2010, 2011, 2013
- Swedish Supercup: 2011

Individual

- Damallsvenskan's Most Valuable Player Award: 2010
- Damallsvenskan's Forward of the Year: 2010

Records

- Damallsvenskan top scorer: 2008 (shared with Marta), 2010, 2011 (shared with Margrét Lára Viðarsdóttir)
- Netherlands all-time top goalscorer from 2010 to 2019

== See also ==
- List of women's footballers with 100 or more international caps
- List of UEFA Women's Championship goalscorers
- List of Netherlands women's international footballers
- List of foreign Damallsvenskan players
- List of OL Reign players
- List of foreign NWSL players
