= Division 1 (Swedish women's football) =

- Founded: 1974
- Country: Sweden
- Number of clubs: 42
- Level on pyramid: 3
- Promotion to: Elitettan
- Relegation to: Division 2
- Domestic cup: Svenska Cupen
- Current: 2024 Division 1

Division 1 (Swedish: Division 1 i fotboll för damer) is the third level in the league system of Swedish women's football and, as of 2023, it has 3 sections with 14 football teams in each.

From 1978 to 1987, when the Damallsvenskan was created, it was the highest level of football in Sweden. Until 2013, when the Elitettan was created, it was the second highest level.

== Current sections - 2023 season ==
The teams in the 2023 season were:

=== Div 1 Mellersta ===
- BK Kenty
- Boo FF
- Degerfors IF
- Enskede IK
- Hertzöga BK
- Husqvarna FF
- P18 IK
- Rävåsens IK
- Segeltorps IF
- Smedby AIS
- Tyresö FF
- Västerås BK
- Älvsjö AIK
- Örebro SK FK

=== Div 1 Norra ===
- Bele Barkarby FF
- Gefle IF FF
- Heffnersklubbans BK
- IFK Östersund
- IF Team Hudik
- IK Brage
- Kvarnsvedens IK
- Luleå Fotboll DFF
- Ope IF
- Sandvikens IF
- Själevads IK
- Sollentuna FK
- Sunnanå SK
- Team TG FF

=== Div 1 Södra ===
- Eskilsminne DIF
- FC Rosengård B
- Halmstads BK
- IFK Göteborg
- IFK Värnamo
- IFK Örby
- IS Halmia
- Ljungskile SK
- Lödöse Nygärd IK
- Malmö FF
- Mariebo IK
- Onsala BK
- Södra Sandby IF
- Örgryte IS

== Promoted teams ==
=== Tier 1 ===
Season	Winner	Runners-up
1978	Öxabäck IF	
1979	Jitex BK	
1980	Sunnanå SK	
1981	Jitex BK	
1982	Sunnanå SK	
1983	Öxabäck IF	
1984	Jitex BK	
1985	Hammarby IF	
1986	Malmö FF	
1987	Öxabäck IF	Jitex BK

=== Tier 2 ===
Season	Mellersta	Norra	Södra
1988		Djurgårdens IF	Mariestad BoIS
1989		Sunnanå SK	Wä IF
1990		Sundsvalls DFF	BK Astrio
1991		Älvsjö AIK	Lindsdals IF
1992		Tyresö FF, AIK	Mallbackens IF
1993		Västerås BK30	Östers IF
1994		Bälinge IF	Mallbackens IF
1995	IFK Lidingö	Umeå IK	Landvetter IF
1996	Lotorps IF	Djurgårdens IF	Östers IF
1997	BK Kenty	Umeå IK	Wä IF
1998	Tyresö FF	Ornäs BK	Östers IF
1999	BK Kenty	Sundbybergs IK	BK Astrio
2000	Mallbackens IF	Sunnanå SK	Holmalunds IF
2001	BK Kenty	Alviks IK	IF Trion

Season	Norrettan	Söderettan
2002	Karlslunds IF	Östers IF, Stattena IF
2003	Själevads IK	Linköpings FC
2004	AIK	QBIK
2005	Bälinge IF	Jitex BK
2006	AIK	Falköpings KIK
2007	Umeå Södra FF	Kristianstads DFF
2008	Piteå IF	Stattena IF
2009	Tyresö FF	Jitex BK
2010	Piteå IF	Dalsjöfors GoIF
2011	AIK	Vittsjö GIK
2012	Sunnanå SK	Mallbackens IF

=== Tier 3 ===
In bold, group champions are promoted to Elitettan.

Season	Mellersta Götaland	Norra Götaland	Norra Svealand	Norrland	Södra Götaland	Södra Svealand	Västra Götaland	Östra Götaland
2013		Lidköpings FK	**Bollstanäs SK**	Assi IF	**IS Halmia**	**IF Brommapojkarna**		IFK Norrköping
2014		**Lidköpings FK**	**Östersunds DFF**	Assi IF		Örebro SK	**Kungsbacka DFF**	**IFK Kalmar**
2015	IF Böljan Falkenberg	**Holmalunds IF Alingsås**	**Sundsvalls DFF**	Umeå Södra FF	**Växjö DFF**	IFK Nyköping		
2016	**IF Böljan Falkenberg**	Jitex BK	Bollstanäs SK	**Assi IF**	Glimåkra IF	**Västerås BK30**		
2017	Jitex BK	**Lidköpings FK**	**Ljusdals IF**	Notvikens IK	**Asarums IF**	IF Brommapojkarna		
2018	Jitex BK	IK Rössö Uddevalla	Bollstanäs SK	**Morön BK**	**Borgeby FK**	**IF Brommapojkarna**		
2019	**Jitex BK**	**Alingsås FC United**	**Bollstanäs SK**	**Sunnanå SK**	Dösjöbro IF	**Älvsjö AIK**		
2020	Mariebo IK	IK Rössö Uddevalla	**Sundsvalls DFF**	Notvikens IK	**Borgeby FK**	**IFK Norrköping**		
2021	**Bergdalens IK**	**Rävåsens IK**	**Gamla Upsala SK**	**Team TG FF**	**Ifö Bromölla IF**	Sollentuna FK		
2022	**BK Häcken B**	**IK Rössö Uddevalla**	**Bollstanäs SK**	Sunnanå SK	**Trelleborgs FF**	Boo FF		

Season	Mellersta	Norra	Södra
**2023**	Örebro SK FK	Sunnanå SK	Malmö FF
**2024**			
**2025**			

Last updated: 17 January 2024
