= Caroline Frånberg =

Swedish footballer

Personal information
- Date of birth: 27 February 1988 (age 38)
- Position: Defender

Senior career*
Years	Team	Apps	(Gls)
2010–2014	Djurgården	46	(0)
- * Club domestic league appearances and goals

Caroline Frånberg (born 27 February 1988) is a Swedish football defender who played for Djurgårdens IF in Damallsvenskan.

Frånberg was raised in Härnösand. She made her Damallsvenskan debut for Djurgårdens IF in the 2010 Damallsvenskan season, in a 0–2 loss against Tyresö FF in April.

In the spring of 2013, she took a break from football due to pregnancy and stress fractures in her hip. She returned to play for Djurgården in 2014 after the birth of her son, Melvin.

In total, she made 46 league appearances for Djurgårdens IF in Damallsvenskan and Elitettan 2010–2014 and scored 0 goals.
