= 2007 Damallsvenskan =

- League: Damallsvenskan
- Sport: football
- Duration: April 11 - November 3, 2007
- Games: 132
- Teams: 12

Seasons
- 2006 Damallsvenskan 2008 Damallsvenskan

The 2007 Damallsvenskan was the 20th season of the Damallsvenskan. Matches were played between 11 April and 3 November 2007, with a break due to the 2007 FIFA Women's World Cup. Umeå IK won the title for the sixth time, and third time in a row. Djurgården finished second, nine points behind.

The previous season, Falköpings KIK and AIK Fotboll (women) were promoted. Falköpings KIK were relegated again, together with QBIK.

Pos	Team	Pld	W	D	L	GF	GA	GD	Pts	Qualification or relegation
1	Umeå IK (C, M)	22	20	0	2	81	19	+62	60	Champion
2	Djurgården	22	16	3	3	51	20	+31	51	
3	LdB FC Malmö	22	14	3	5	54	17	+37	45	
4	Kopparbergs/Göteborg FC	22	12	2	8	54	47	+7	38	
5	Sunnanå SK	22	9	8	5	36	25	+11	35	
6	Linköpings FC	22	10	5	7	40	30	+10	35	
7	KIF Örebro	22	8	6	8	28	32	−4	30	
8	Hammarby	22	6	3	13	27	46	−19	21	
9	Bälinge IF	22	5	4	13	29	42	−13	19	
10	AIK (N)	22	3	6	13	10	45	−35	15	
11	Falköpings KIK (N)	22	4	2	16	17	65	−48	14	Relegated
12	QBIK	22	1	6	15	16	55	−39	9	Relegated

(C) Champions; (M) Defending Champion; (N) Newly promoted
