= Swedish Division 1 =

Swedish Division 1 can refer to:

- Division 1 (Swedish football), third level in the Swedish football league system
- Swedish Women's Football Division 1, third level in the league system of Swedish women's football
- Hockeyettan, formerly known as Division 1, third tier of ice hockey in Sweden
