= 2008 Damallsvenskan =

Women's football season in Sweden

Damallsvenskan
- Season: 2008
- Champions: Umeå IK
- Relegated: Umeå Södra, Bälinge
- Top goalscorer: Manon Melis, Marta (23 goals)

The 2008 Damallsvenskan was the 21st season of the Damallsvenskan, the highest level of professional women's football in Sweden, with 12 teams competing. The season ran from 6 April to 18 October. For the fourth time in a row the league was won by Umeå IK. Newly promoted Umeå Södra were relegated, as were Bälinge. Manon Melis and Marta finished as the season's top scorers with 23 goals. Prior to the season's last game, Marta was on 17 goals, but she managed to catch up with Melis by scoring six times in an 11–1 win over relegated Bälinge.

== Summary ==
The game Linköpings FC–Umeå IK (1–4) on 3 september was played at Folkungavallen in Linköping in front of 9 413 spectators, leading to a new Damallsvenskan record attendance.

== Table ==
Pos	Team	Pld	W	D	L	GF	GA	GD	Pts	Qualification or relegation
1	Umeå IK (C, Q)	22	18	3	1	80	17	+63	57	Qualification to Champions League Round of 32
2	Linköpings FC (Q)	22	17	2	3	54	19	+35	53	Qualification to Champions League Qualifying Round
3	LdB FC Malmö	22	16	3	3	62	22	+40	51	
4	AIK	22	14	3	5	49	18	+31	45	
5	Djurgårdens IF	22	9	6	7	38	29	+9	33	
6	Kopparbergs/Göteborg FC	22	10	0	12	45	38	+7	30	
7	KIF Örebro	22	9	3	10	23	31	−8	30	
8	Hammarby IF	22	7	4	11	23	41	−18	25	
9	Kristianstads DFF	22	6	2	14	23	54	−31	20	
10	Sunnanå SK	22	5	4	13	27	37	−10	19	
11	Umeå Södra (R)	22	2	3	17	13	73	−60	9	Relegation to First Division
12	Bälinge IF (R)	22	0	5	17	9	67	−58	5	Relegation to First Division

Rules for classification: 1) Points; 2) Goal difference; 3) Number of goals scored
(C) Champions; (Q) Qualified for the phase indicated; (R) Relegated
