= 2010 Damallsvenskan =

Damallsvenskan
- Season: 2010
- Champions: LdB Malmö
- Top goalscorer: Manon Melis (25 goals)

The 2010 Damallsvenskan was marked 23rd season of the Sweden’s premier women’s football league. Spanning from 3 April to 16 October, this season had the second-latest start date in league history. Linköpings FC aimed to retain their title, while former champions Jitex made a return after a three year absence. Tyresö FF, promoted from the 1st division North, returned for the first time and played in the Damallsvenskan for the first time since 1999.

LdB FC clinched with three games remaining, following a 1–1 draw with Kopparbergs/Göteborg FC. This victory marked Malmö’s title for Malmö since 1994. In an impressive campaign, LdB FC won 18 of their first 20 matches, finishing with 59 points-the best season for any club since Umeå IK in 2007. Dutch Forward Manon Melis emerged as the league’s top scorer, netting 25 goals for the Malmö club. The club also strengthened its squad by signing Icelandic goalkeeper Þóra Helgadóttir from Kolbotn and Australian-New Zealander Kathryn Gill from Sunnanå. Kopparbergs/Göteborg in finished second place, marking their best league performance at that time, which earned them qualification for the Champions’ League

Both newly promoted teams performed exceptionally well, with Tyresö finishing fourth, and Jitex finishing sixth. The season marked the first occasion since the 1992 Damallsvenskan in that which newly promoted team finished in the top four, and the first time ever that two newly promoted teams finished in the top six.

At the opposite end of the table, AIK faced relegation after four seasons in the Damallsvenskan. Two teams with a long history in the Damallsvenskan fought over the other relegation spot; In a decisive final match, Hammarby secured victory, surpassing Sunnanå in the standings, resulting that two Stockholm teams went down. Sunnanå SK was relegated to first division for the first time since 2000, marking a significant moment in the club’s history.

== Table ==
Pos	Team	Pld	W	D	L	GF	GA	GD	Pts	Qualification or relegation
1	LdB Malmö FC (C, Q)	22	19	2	1	66	18	+48	59	Qualification to Champions League Round of 32
2	Kopparbergs/Göteborg FC (Q)	22	14	6	2	59	18	+41	48	Qualification to Champions League Round of 32
3	Linköpings FC	22	11	7	4	39	15	+24	40	
4	Tyresö FF	22	12	4	6	41	26	+15	40	
5	KIF Örebro	22	9	6	7	31	27	+4	33	
6	Jitex BK	22	10	3	9	32	39	−7	33	
7	Umeå IK	22	8	3	11	25	40	−15	27	
8	Djurgårdens IF	22	6	4	12	24	34	−10	22	
9	Kristianstads DFF	22	5	5	12	32	48	−16	20	
10	Hammarby IF	22	5	3	14	22	37	−15	18	
11	Sunnanå SK (R)	22	4	5	13	18	53	−35	17	Relegation to First Division
12	AIK (R)	22	3	4	15	16	50	−34	13	Relegation to First Division

Rules for classification: 1) Points; 2) Goal difference; 3) Number of goals scored
(C) Champions; (Q) Qualified for the phase indicated; (R) Relegated
