= 2006 Damallsvenskan =

Swedish football league season

Damallsvenskan
- Season: 2006
- Champions: Umeå IK
- Relegated: Jitex BK; Mallbackens IF
- UEFA Women's Cup: Umeå IK
- Matches: 132
- Goals: 422 (3.2 per match)
- Average goals/game: 3.2
- Top goalscorer: Lotta Schelin, Kopparbergs/Göteborg FC (21)
- Highest attendance: 3,427 (Linköpings FC v Umeå IK)
- Average attendance: 814

The 2006 Damallsvenskan was the 19th season of the Damallsvenskan. Matches were played between 17 April and 29 October 2006. Umeå IK won the league, defending their title from the previous year. It was Umeå's fourth title overall. Djurgården/Älvsjö finished second, 21 points behind the champions. This was the biggest gap between first and second place in Damalsvenskan's history. Linköpings FC finished third.

The previous season, Bälinge IF and Jitex BK were promoted. Jitex were relegated again, together with Mallbackens IF.

Place	Team	P	W	D	L	+	-	GD	P
1	Umeå IK (M)	22	21	1	0	74	11	+63	64
2	Djurgården/Älvsjö	22	13	4	5	61	23	+38	43
3	Linköpings FC	22	12	5	5	43	25	+18	41
4	Malmö FF Dam	22	11	7	4	41	23	+18	40
5	Kopparbergs/Göteborg FC	22	10	5	7	44	36	+8	35
6	KIF Örebro DFF	22	8	5	9	33	33	0	29
7	Hammarby IF DFF	22	8	5	9	34	43	+1	29
8	Sunnanå SK	22	8	3	11	26	33	-7	27
9	Bälinge IF (N)	22	4	7	11	16	41	-25	19
10	QBIK	22	2	9	11	18	51	-33	15
11	Jitex BK (N)	22	2	7	13	17	59	-42	13
12	Mallbackens IF	22	3	2	17	15	44	-29	11

Winners are marked in green, and relegated teams in pink. (N) marks newly promoted teams, and (M) marks the defending champions.
