= 2015 Damallsvenskan =

Damallsvenskan
- Season: 2015
- Champions: Rosengård (10th title)
- Relegated: AIK; Hammarby
- Champions League: Rosengård; Eskilstuna United
- Matches: 132
- Goals: 394 (2.98 per match)
- Top goalscorer: Gaëlle Enganamouit (18 goals)
- Biggest home win: FC Rosengård 7–0 Kristianstads DFF (21 May 2015)
- Biggest away win: AIK 0–5 Kristianstads DFF (9 May 2015); AIK 0–5 Linköpings FC (12 September 2015); AIK 0–5 FC Rosengård (11 October 2015)
- Highest scoring: AIK 3–6 Umeå IK (22 August 2015)
- Longest winning run: 7 matches FC Rosengård
- Longest unbeaten run: 13 matches FC Rosengård
- Longest winless run: 22 matches AIK
- Longest losing run: 7 matches AIK
- Highest attendance: 6,312; Eskilstuna United DFF 2–0 Kopparbergs/Göteborg FC (18 October 2015)
- Lowest attendance: 102; AIK 1–2 KIF Örebro (26 September 2015)
- Total attendance: 119,762
- Average attendance: 907
- All statistics correct as of 20 October 2015.

2015 Damallsvenskan was the 27th season of the Swedish women's association football top division, Damallsvenskan. It was played between 11 April 2015 and 18 October 2015. FC Rosengård were the defending champions, having won the competition in 2014. They successfully defended their title and together with Eskilstuna United qualified for the 2016–17 UEFA Women's Champions League.

AIK and Hammarby were relegated to the 2016 Elitettan.

== Teams ==
Locations of the 2015 Damallsvenskan teams

Tyresö FF and Jitex BK were relegated at the end of the 2014 season after finishing in the bottom two places of the table. They were replaced by Elitettan top-two teams Mallbackens IF and Hammarby IF.

Team	Location	Stadium	Stadium capacity^{1}
AIK	Solna	Skytteholms IP	1,800
Eskilstuna United DFF	Eskilstuna	Tunavallen	7,600
FC Rosengård	Malmö	Malmö IP	5,700
Hammarby IF	Stockholm	Zinkensdamms IP	2,000
KIF Örebro	Örebro	Behrn Arena	12,624
Kopparbergs/Göteborg FC	Gothenburg	Valhalla IP	4,000
Kristianstads DFF	Kristianstad	Vilans IP	5,000
Linköpings FC	Linköping	Arena Linköping	8,500
Mallbackens IF	Värmland	Strandvallen	4,000
Piteå IF	Piteå	LF Arena	3,000
Umeå IK	Umeå	T3 Arena	8,000
Vittsjö GIK	Vittsjö	Vittsjö IP	3,000

Note: ^{1} According to each club information page at the Swedish Football Association website for Damallsvenskan.

== League table ==
Pos	Team	Pld	W	D	L	GF	GA	GD	Pts	Qualification or relegation
1	FC Rosengård (C, Q)	22	15	6	1	60	16	+44	51	Qualification to Champions League Round of 32
2	Eskilstuna United DFF (Q)	22	16	2	4	41	15	+26	50	Qualification to Champions League Round of 32
3	Piteå IF	22	13	6	3	45	25	+20	45	
4	Linköpings FC	22	14	2	6	43	17	+26	44	
5	KIF Örebro	22	10	4	8	36	30	+6	34	
6	Kopparbergs/Göteborg FC	22	9	5	8	32	33	−1	32	
7	Kristianstads DFF	22	8	3	11	33	41	−8	27	
8	Umeå IK	22	6	6	10	28	34	−6	24	
9	Vittsjö GIK	22	6	6	10	26	38	−12	24	
10	Mallbackens IF	22	5	3	14	19	36	−17	18	
11	Hammarby IF (R)	22	3	9	10	20	38	−18	18	Relegation to Elitettan
12	AIK (R)	22	0	2	20	11	71	−60	2	Relegation to Elitettan

Updated to match(es) played on 18 October 2015. Source: svenskfotboll.se (in Swedish)
Rules for classification: 1) Points; 2) Goal difference; 3) Number of goals scored; 4) Head-to-head points; 5) Head-to-head goal difference; 6) Head-to-head away goals scored
(C) Champions; (Q) Qualified for the phase indicated; (R) Relegated

== Results ==
Home \ Away	AIK	ESK	FCR	HAM	KIFÖ	KGFC	KDFF	LFC	MIF	PIF	UIK	VGIK
AIK		0–3	0–5	1–1	1–2	0–2	0–5	0–5	0–1	0–2	3–6	0–4
Eskilstuna United DFF	5–1		1–2	3–1	3–1	2–0	2–0	1–0	2–0	0–3	2–0	2–0
FC Rosengård	4–0	2–1		5–0	2–1	2–2	7–0	5–0	2–1	5–2	2–0	2–2
Hammarby IF	1–1	0–2	0–1		0–0	3–2	2–2	0–0	3–1	0–0	1–1	2–2
KIF Örebro	1–0	1–2	1–4	3–1		1–1	4–2	2–1	2–1	2–3	2–0	4–0
Kopparbergs/Göteborg FC	5–1	1–3	0–0	3–0	2–4		3–0	1–0	1–0	0–0	1–3	3–1
Kristianstads DFF	5–0	0–2	0–0	1–0	3–1	3–1		0–3	2–1	2–3	1–0	3–1
Linköpings FC	4–0	0–0	2–1	3–0	2–1	4–0	1–0		5–1	5–0	0–2	2–0
Mallbackens IF	1–0	0–2	1–1	2–3	1–0	0–1	1–0	0–1		1–4	0–0	2–1
Piteå IF	4–1	1–0	2–2	2–1	1–1	4–0	4–0	2–0	2–1		1–1	0–1
Umeå IK	2–0	1–2	0–2	2–0	0–2	1–1	4–3	1–2	2–2	2–2		0–2
Vittsjö GIK	3–2	1–1	0–4	1–1	0–0	1–2	1–1	0–3	2–1	0–3	3–0	

Updated to match(es) played on 18 October 2015. Source: svenskfotboll.se (in Swedish)
Legend: Blue = home team win; Yellow = draw; Red = away team win.

== Season statistics ==
As of 20 October 2015

=== Top scorers ===
Rank	Player	Club	Goals
1	(Cameroon) Gaëlle Enganamouit	Eskilstuna United DFF	18
2	(Denmark) Pernille Harder	Linköpings FC	17
3	(Sweden) Pauline Hammarlund	Piteå IF	16
4	(North Macedonia) Nataša Andonova	FC Rosengård	12
5	(Sweden) Hanna Pettersson	Piteå IF	10
6	(Switzerland) Ramona Bachmann	FC Rosengård	9
6	(Nigeria) Ogonna Chukwudi	KIF Örebro	9
6	(Ivory Coast) Ida Guehai	Kristianstads DFF	9
6	(Sweden) Jenny Hjohlman	Umeå IK	9
6	(Netherlands) Manon Melis	Kopparbergs/Göteborg FC	9
