= 2016 Damallsvenskan =

Damallsvenskan
- Season: 2016
- Champions: Linköpings FC (3rd title)
- Relegated: Mallbackens IF; Umeå IK
- Champions League: FC Rosengård; Linköpings FC
- Matches: 132
- Goals: 404 (3.06 per match)
- Top goalscorer: Pernille Harder (24 goals)
- All statistics correct as of 00:40, 12 May 2016 (UTC).

The 2016 Damallsvenskan is the 28th season of the Swedish women's association football top division, Damallsvenskan. FC Rosengård were the defending champions, having won the competition in 2015.

Linköpings FC is the champion of the season.

== Teams ==
Locations of the 2015 Damallsvenskan teams

Team	Location	Stadium	Stadium capacity^{1}
Djurgårdens IF	Stockholm	Stockholm Olympic Stadium	14,417
Eskilstuna United	Eskilstuna	Tunavallen	7,600
FC Rosengård	Malmö	Malmö IP	5,700
KIF Örebro	Örebro	Behrn Arena	12,624
Kopparbergs/Göteborg	Gothenburg	Valhalla IP	4,000
Kristianstads DFF	Kristianstad	Vilans IP	5,000
Kvarnsvedens IK	Borlänge	Ljungbergsplanen	1,000
Linköpings FC	Linköping	Arena Linköping	8,500
Mallbackens IF	Värmland	Strandvallen	4,000
Piteå IF	Piteå	LF Arena	3,000
Umeå IK	Umeå	T3 Arena	8,000
Vittsjö GIK	Vittsjö	Vittsjö IP	3,000

Note: ^{1} According to each club information page at the Swedish Football Association website for Damallsvenskan.

== League table ==
Pos	Team	Pld	W	D	L	GF	GA	GD	Pts	Qualification or relegation
1	Linköpings FC (C, Q)	22	20	2	0	73	14	+59	62	Qualification to Champions League Round of 32
2	FC Rosengård (Q)	22	16	4	2	62	13	+49	52	Qualification to Champions League Round of 32
3	Eskilstuna United	22	11	5	6	34	26	+8	38	
4	Piteå IF	22	10	7	5	29	31	−2	37	
5	Kopparbergs/Göteborg	22	9	6	7	35	24	+11	33	
6	Djurgårdens IF	22	7	6	9	32	34	−2	27	
7	Vittsjö GIK	22	5	9	8	29	37	−8	24	
8	KIF Örebro	22	5	8	9	27	38	−11	23	
9	Kvarnsvedens IK	22	5	8	9	30	48	−18	23	
10	Kristianstads DFF	22	3	6	13	18	35	−17	15	
11	Umeå IK	22	2	7	13	16	47	−31	13	Relegation to Elitettan
12	Mallbackens IF	22	3	4	15	19	57	−38	13	Relegation to Elitettan

Updated to match(es) played on 30 October 2016. Source: soccerway.com
Rules for classification: 1) Points; 2) Goal difference; 3) Number of goals scored; 4) Head-to-head points; 5) Head-to-head goal difference; 6) Head-to-head away goals scored
(C) Champions; (Q) Qualified for the phase indicated

== Top scorers ==
As of 5 November 2016.

Rank	Player	Club	Goals
1	(Denmark) Pernille Harder	Linköpings FC	24
2	(Sweden) Stina Blackstenius	Linköpings FC	20
3	(Malawi) Tabita Chawinga	Kvarnsvedens IK	15
4	(Brazil) Marta	FC Rosengård	13
4	(Sweden) Mimmi Larsson	Eskilstuna United DFF	13
4	(United States) Ella Masar	FC Rosengård	13
7	(Sweden) Pauline Hammarlund	Kopparbergs/Göteborg FC	12
7	(Netherlands) Lieke Martens	FC Rosengård	12
9	(Norway) Kristine Minde	Linköpings FC	11
10	(Sweden) Mia Jalkerud	Djurgårdens IF	9
