= 2014 Damallsvenskan =

Damallsvenskan
- Season: 2014
- Champions: Rosengård
- Relegated: Tyresö FF; Jitex BK
- Champions League: Rosengård; KIF Örebro
- Matches: 110
- Goals: 320 (2.91 per match)
- Top goalscorer: Anja Mittag (21 goals)
- Biggest home win: Göteborg 8-0 Jitex (5 June)
- Biggest away win: Jitex 0-8 Linköpings (16 August)
- Highest scoring: Rosengård 7–1 Vittsjö (16 April); Göteborg 8-0 Jitex (5 June); Jitex 0-8 Linköpings (16 August)
- Longest winning run: 10 games Rosengård
- Longest unbeaten run: 10 games Rosengård
- Longest winless run: 20 games Jitex BK
- Longest losing run: 20 games Jitex BK
- Highest attendance: 5,221; Linköpings 2–0 Umeå IK (10 August)
- Lowest attendance: 151; AIK 0–3 KIF Örebro (27 September)
- Average attendance: 836 (as of 19 October)
- All statistics correct as of 19 October 2014. Statistics retrieved from svenskfotboll.se (in Swedish)

The 2014 Damallsvenskan, part of the 2014 Swedish football season, was the 27th season of Damallsvenskan since its establishment in 1988. The season started on 13 April 2014 and ended on 19 October 2014. LdB Malmö, which was renamed to FC Rosengård in December 2013, were the defending champions and won the title with several match days before the end of the season.

Originally the season featured 12 teams, but due to Tyresö FF's midseason withdrawal, the season ended with 11 teams; nine returned from the 2013 season and the other two were promoted from Elitettan. On 28 September 2014, with few fixtures remaining in the season, relegation was confirmed for Jitex BK after they were defeated by Kristianstads.

== Teams ==
Locations of the 2014 Damallsvenskan teams

Mallbackens IF and Sunnanå SK were relegated at the end of the 2013 season after finishing in the bottom two places of the table. They were replaced by Elitettan top-two teams Eskilstuna United DFF and AIK.

Team	Location	Stadium	Stadium capacity^{1}
AIK	Solna	Skytteholms IP	1,800
Eskilstuna United DFF	Eskilstuna	Tunavallen	7,600
FC Rosengård	Malmö	Malmö IP	5,700
Jitex BK	Mölndal	Åbyvallen	2,500
KIF Örebro DFF	Örebro	Behrn Arena	12,624
Kopparbergs/Göteborg FC	Gothenburg	Valhalla IP	4,000
Kristianstads DFF	Kristianstad	Vilans IP	5,000
Linköpings FC	Linköping	Arena Linköping	8,500
Piteå IF	Piteå	LF Arena	3,000
Tyresö FF^{2}	Tyresö	Tyresövallen	3,500
Umeå IK	Umeå	T3 Arena	8,000
Vittsjö GIK	Vittsjö	Vittsjö IP	3,000

1 According to each club information page at the Swedish Football Association website for Allsvenskan.
2 Withdrew midseason due to lack of players.

== League table ==
Pos	Team	Pld	W	D	L	GF	GA	GD	Pts	Qualification or relegation
1	FC Rosengård (C, Q)	20	18	0	2	62	17	+45	54	Qualification to Champions League Round of 32
2	KIF Örebro DFF (Q)	20	14	0	6	32	14	+18	42	Qualification to Champions League Round of 32
3	Kopparbergs/Göteborg FC	20	12	3	5	50	21	+29	39	
4	Linköpings FC	20	11	5	4	43	19	+24	38	
5	Kristianstads DFF	20	9	4	7	21	18	+3	31	
6	Umeå IK	20	8	3	9	35	29	+6	27	
7	Eskilstuna United DFF	20	6	8	6	25	31	−6	26	
8	Vittsjö GIK	20	7	2	11	21	40	−19	23	
9	Piteå IF	20	6	3	11	22	32	−10	21	
10	AIK	20	4	2	14	13	48	−35	14	
11	Jitex BK (R)	20	0	0	20	6	61	−55	0	Relegation to Elitettan
–	Tyresö FF (D, R)	0	0	0	0	0	0	0	0	Withdrawn and relegation to Division 2 (Note: On 5 June 2014, Tyresö FF withdrew from the league due to lack of players and financial reasons, and was relegated to the fourth-tier league Division 2. Tyresö had at that time played eight matches, which were then nullified and deleted from the table, and stood at place 9 of 12. As a result, only one other team was relegated to Elitettan at the end of the season.)

Source: svenskfotboll.se (in Swedish)
Rules for classification: 1) Points; 2) Goal difference; 3) Number of goals scored; 4) Head-to-head points; 5) Head-to-head goal difference; 6) Head-to-head away goals scored
(C) Champions; (D) Disqualified; (Q) Qualified for the phase indicated; (R) Relegated

== Results ==
Home \ Away	AIK	ESK	FCR	JBK	KIFÖ	KGFC	KDFF	LFC	PIF	UIK	VGIK
AIK		2–2	0–4	1–0	0–3	0–3	0–2	1–1	2–1	0–2	0–2
Eskilstuna United DFF	3–0		0–4	2–0	2–0	1–1	0–0	1–1	3–2	2–3	1–0
FC Rosengård	4–0	3–0		3–0	1–0	5–0	2–1	2–3	6–1	4–2	7–1
Jitex BK	2–3	1–2	0–1		1–2	0–4	0–1	0–8	0–1	0–1	0–2
KIF Örebro DFF	1–0	2–0	0–1	2–0		0–1	1–0	2–0	3–2	1–0	3–1
Kopparbergs/Göteborg FC	6–0	3–2	2–3	8–0	0–2		3–1	1–1	1–0	5–0	3–1
Kristianstads DFF	1–0	1–1	1–2	3–0	0–2	3–2		1–0	0–1	1–0	0–0
Linköpings FC	4–0	0–0	2–0	6–0	0–4	2–1	1–1		3–1	2–0	4–1
Piteå IF	1–2	1–1	2–4	3–1	1–0	0–1	2–3	1–0		1–1	1–0
Umeå IK	3–2	6–1	1–2	6–0	2–3	0–0	1–0	1–3	0–0		6–1
Vittsjö GIK	3–0	1–1	1–4	2–1	2–1	0–5	0–1	1–2	1–0	1–0	

Updated to match(es) played on 19 October 2014. Source: svenskfotboll.se (in Swedish)
Legend: Blue = home team win; Yellow = draw; Red = away team win.

== Season statistics ==
As of 19 October 2014

=== Top scorers ===
Rank	Player	Club	Goals
1	(Germany) Anja Mittag	FC Rosengård	21
2	(Netherlands) Manon Melis	Kopparbergs/Göteborg FC	14
3	(Sweden) Jenny Hjohlman	Umeå IK	12
4	(Switzerland) Ramona Bachmann	FC Rosengård	11
5	(Scotland) Jane Ross	Vittsjö GIK	10
6	(Denmark) Pernille Harder	Linköpings FC	9
6	(Sweden) Sara Lindén	Kopparbergs/Göteborg FC	9
8	(Finland) Emmi Alanen	Umeå IK	8
8	(Nigeria) Sarah Michael	KIF Örebro DFF	8
8	(Sweden) Fridolina Rolfö	Linköpings FC	8
8	(Finland) Sanna Talonen	KIF Örebro DFF	8
