= Svenska Cupen (women) =

Swedish women's football tournament

- Founded: 1981
- Region: Sweden
- Teams: 78
- Current champions: Hammarby IF (5th title)
- Most championships: Öxabäck IF; FC Rosengård (6 titles)
- Website: Svenska Cupen (in Swedish)
- 2025–26

Svenska Cupen (lit. 'Swedish Cup'), also known as the Swedish Women's Cup in English, is the main Swedish women's association football knock-out tournament. A separate Svenska Cupen exists for men.

Hammarby IF are the reigning champions, having defeated BK Häcken in the 2026 final. Öxabäck IF and FC Rosengård are the most successful teams, with six titles each.

== Rounds and teams ==
- First round – 44 teams (Division 1 and below)
- Second round – 36 teams (22 remaining teams from Round 1 + 14 teams from Elitettan)
- Third round – 32 teams (18 remaining teams from Round 2 + 14 teams from Damallsvenskan)
- Fourth round – 16 teams
- Fifth round – quarter finals
- Sixth round – semi finals
- Seventh round – final

== Qualification ==
=== District teams ===
There are a number of districts in the Swedish Football Association (SvFF), and each of them receives a number of spots in the Swedish Cup, due to how many licensed players they have. For an example, Värmlands FF receives three spots and Västergötlands FF receives seven spots.

== Previous winners ==
Seasons 1998/1999 and 1999/2000 were played as fall/spring; all other seasons were played spring/fall.

The cup was also called Folksam Cup between 1981 and 1996.

The winners are:

Year	Winner (title no)	Result	Runners-up
1981	Jitex BK (1)	5–3 (pen.)	Hammarby IF
1982	Jitex BK (2)	4–1	Hammarby IF
1983	Sunnanå SK (1)	2–0	Hammarby IF
1984	Jitex BK (3)	5–2	Alnö IF
1985	Öxabäck IF (1)	2–0	GAIS
1986	Öxabäck IF (2)	1–0	Sunnanå SK
1987	Öxabäck IF (3)	2–0	Jitex BK
1988	Öxabäck IF (4)	1–0	Mallbackens IF
1989	Öxabäck IF (5)	2–1	Jitex BK
1990	Malmö FF (1)	3–0	Öxabäck IF
1991	Öxabäck/Mark IF (6)	3–2	Gideonsbergs IF
1992	Älvsjö AIK (1)	2–1	Gideonsbergs IF
1993	Gideonsbergs IF (1)	4–1	Älvsjö AIK
1994	Hammarby IF (1)	2–1	Gideonsbergs IF
1995	Hammarby IF (2)	1–0	Älvsjö AIK
1996	Älvsjö AIK (2)	2–1	Bälinge IF
1997	Malmö FF (2)	2–1	Sunnanå SK
1998–99	Älvsjö AIK (3)	2–1 (aet)	Djurgårdens IF
1999–2000	Djurgårdens IF (1)	3–1	Älvsjö AIK
2001	Umeå IK (1)	2–1	Djurgårdens IF
2002	Umeå IK (2)	3–0	Kopparbergs/Landvetter IF
2003	Umeå IK (3)	1–0 (aet)	Malmö FF
2004	Djurgården/Älvsjö (2)	2–1	Umeå IK
2005	Djurgården/Älvsjö (3)	3–1	Umeå IK
2006	Linköpings FC (1)	3–2	Umeå IK
2007	Umeå IK (4)	4–3	AIK
2008	Linköpings FC (2)	1–0 (aet)	Umeå IK
2009	Linköpings FC (3)	2–0	Umeå IK
2010	KIF Örebro (1)	4–1	Djurgården/Älvsjö
2011	Göteborg FC (1)	2–2 (aet); 3–2 (pen.)	Tyresö FF
2012	Göteborg FC (2)	2–1 (aet)	Tyresö FF
2013–14	Linköpings FC (4)	2–1	Kristianstads DFF
2014–15	Linköpings FC (5)	2–0	FC Rosengård
2015–16	FC Rosengård (3)	3–1	Linköpings FC
2016–17	FC Rosengård (4)	1–0	Linköpings FC
2017–18	FC Rosengård (5)	1–0	Linköpings FC
2018–19	Göteborg FC (3)	2–1	Kristianstads DFF
2019–20	season cancelled because of the Coronavirus pandemic		
2020–21	BK Häcken (1)	3–0	Eskilstuna United
2021–22	FC Rosengård (6)	2–1 (aet)	BK Häcken
2022–23	Hammarby IF (3)	3–0	BK Häcken
2023–24	Piteå IF (1)	3–0	BK Häcken
2024–25	Hammarby IF (4)	2–0	IFK Norrköping

== Clubs by title ==
Total cup wins by club
Club	Winners	Runners-up
FC Rosengård (Note: including results as Malmö FF.)	6	2
Öxabäcks IF	6	1
Hammarby IF	5	3
Linköpings FC	5	3
Umeå IK	4	5
BK Häcken (Note: including results as Kopparbergs/Landvetter IF and Kopparbergs/Göteborg FC)	4	4
Jitex BK	3	2
Älvsjö AIK	3	3
Djurgårdens IF (Note: including results as Djurgården/Älvsjö.)	3	3
Sunnanå SK	1	2
Gideonsbergs IF	1	3
KIF Örebro	1	0
Piteå IF	1	0
Tyresö FF	0	2
AIK	0	1
Alnö IF	0	1
Bälinge IF	0	1
Eskilstuna United	0	1
GAIS	0	1
Kristianstads DFF	0	2
Mallbackens IF	0	1
