= Lindsdals IF =

Swedish football club

- Full name: Lindsdals Idrottsförening
- Founded: 1926
- Ground: Fjölebro IP, Kalmar
- Capacity: 1,000
- Chairman: Pia Jonsson
- Head coach: Jonas Klippvik
- Coach: Mikael Bengtsson; Dennis Nilsson
- League: Division 3 Sydöstra Götaland
- 2018: Division 2 Östra Götaland, 14th
Home colours	Away colours

Lindsdals IF is a Swedish football club located just outside Kalmar in Småland. The club's major sport is football but table tennis is also available.

== Background ==
Since their foundation on 26 July 1926 Lindsdals IF has participated mainly in the middle and lower divisions of the Swedish football league system. The club currently plays in Division 2 Södra Götaland which is the fourth tier of Swedish football. They play their home matches at the Fjölebro IP in Kalmar.

Thanks to a partnership with Kalmar FF the club hope to be able to take further strides up the league system. Lindsdals IF run a large number of teams with approximately 400 young people active in both boys and girls' teams. The club's ladies team competed in the Damallsvenskan for several years in the 1990s.Their most famous player was Cecilia Sandell who later became an international. English World Cup players Tina Mapes and Karen Farley also played for the club.

Lindsdals IF are affiliated to the Smålands Fotbollförbund.

== Season to season ==
Season	Level	Division	Section	Position	Movements
1993	Tier 5	Division 4	Småland Sydöstra	8th	
1994	Tier 5	Division 4	Småland Sydöstra	5th	
1995	Tier 5	Division 4	Småland Sydöstra	3rd	
1996	Tier 5	Division 4	Småland Sydöstra	6th	
1997	Tier 5	Division 4	Småland Sydöstra	7th	
1998	Tier 5	Division 4	Småland Sydöstra	3rd	
1999	Tier 5	Division 4	Småland Sydöstra	6th	
2000	Tier 5	Division 4	Småland Sydöstra	5th	
2001	Tier 5	Division 4	Småland Östra Elit	4th	Promotion Playoffs – Promoted
2002	Tier 4	Division 3	Sydöstra Götaland	8th	
2003	Tier 4	Division 3	Sydöstra Götaland	6th	
2004	Tier 4	Division 3	Sydöstra Götaland	6th	
2005	Tier 4	Division 3	Sydöstra Götaland	8th	
2006*	Tier 5	Division 3	Sydöstra Götaland	2nd	Promotion Playoffs – Promoted
2007	Tier 4	Division 2	Mellersta Götaland	10th	Relegation Playoffs
2008	Tier 4	Division 2	Östra Götaland	7th	
2009	Tier 4	Division 2	Södra Götaland	3rd	
2010	Tier 4	Division 2	Östra Götaland	5th	
2011	Tier 4	Division 2	Södra Götaland	7th	
2012	Tier 4	Division 2	Östra Götaland	3rd	
2013	Tier 4	Division 2	Södra Götaland	5th	
2014	Tier 4	Division 2	Östra Götaland	10th	
2015	Tier 4	Division 2	Södra Götaland	7th	
2016	Tier 4	Division 2	Södra Götaland	11th	

* League restructuring in 2006 resulted in a new division being created at Tier 3 and subsequent divisions dropping a level.
