= Öxabäcks IF =

Sports club in Öxabäck, Sweden

- Full name: Öxabäcks idrottsförening
- Sport: Football; Floorball (earlier)
- Based in: Öxabäck, Sweden
- Ballpark: Hagavallen

Öxabäcks IF is a sports club in Öxabäck, Sweden, established in 1931. The women's football section was established in 1966 as one of the earliest organised women's football teams in Sweden and adopted the name "Öxabäck/Marks IF" in 1991 to show up more of its connections with Mark Municipality before adopting the previous name some years later.

The women's football team won the Swedish national championship in 1972 (unofficial), 1973, 1975, 1978, 1983, 1987 and 1988. and the Swedish Cup in 1985, 1986, 1987, 1988, 1989 and 1991. The club was relegated from Damallsvenskan during the 1998 season.

The floorball section merged with Örby IF and Berghems IF in 1999 to create Team Tygriket 99 – later IBK Tygriket 99.
