= Gideonsbergs IF =

Swedish sports club

- Full name: Gideonsbergs idrottsförening
- Sport: soccer bandy (earlier)
- Based in: Västerås, Sweden
- Ballpark: Önsta IP

Gideonsbergs IF is a sports club in Västerås, Sweden. Established in 1955, the women's soccer section was established in 1971. The women's soccer team won the Swedish national championship in 1992. and the Swedish Cup in 1993.

The women's bandy team has played 2 seasons in the Swedish top division,
