= Damallsvenskan =

Swedish women's association football top division

OBOS Damallsvenskan
- Founded: 1988; 38 years ago
- Country: Sweden
- Confederation: UEFA
- Number of clubs: 14
- Relegation to: Elitettan
- Domestic cup: Svenska Cupen
- International cup: UEFA Champions League
- Current champions: BK Häcken (3rd title) (2026)
- Most championships: FC Rosengård (14 titles)
- Broadcasters: Fanseat; Viaplay
- Website: https://www.obosdamallsvenskan.se/
- Current: 2026 Damallsvenskan

The Damallsvenskan (Swedish: [ˈdɑ̂ːmˌalːsvɛnskan]; lit. 'Women's Allsvenskan'), also known as OBOS Damallsvenskan for sponsorship reasons, is the highest division of women's football in Sweden. Founded in 1988, it is considered one of the best women's football leagues in the world.

The division consists of a league of 14 teams. From 2013, the Damallsvenskan began operating on a system of promotion and relegation with the Elitettan. The two lowest placed teams are relegated to the Elitettan, and the two highest placed teams from the Elitettan are promoted in their place. Starting with the 2022 season the league has been expanded from 12 to 14 teams.

The first Swedish women's national championship was played in 1973. Since its inception, the Damallsvenskan has featured star players like Marta, Daniela, Nadine Angerer, Lisa De Vanna, Hope Solo, Christen Press, and Hanna Ljungberg. It is also the first women's domestic league to turn professional since its inception in 1988.

The top three teams in the Damallsvenskan qualify for the UEFA Women's Champions League.

Games from the 2022 Damallsvenskan were broadcast on the Swedish sports television channel, Viaplay. International viewers watched on Fanseat via subscription.

== Clubs ==
=== 2026 season ===
Team	Location	Stadium	Capacity (Note: According to each club information page previously available at the Swedish Football Association website for Damallsvenskan, unless otherwise noted. Since May 2018 this is no longer present. Numbers were usually lower than official stadium numbers.)
AIK	Stockholm	Skytteholms IP	5,200
Brommapojkarna	Stockholm	Grimsta IP	5,000
Djurgården	Stockholm	Stockholm Olympic Stadium	14,417
Eskilstuna	Eskilstuna	Tunavallen	7,800
Hammarby	Stockholm	Hammarby IP	3,700
Häcken	Gothenburg	Bravida Arena	6,500
Kristianstad	Kristianstad	Kristianstads Fotbollsarena	3,080 (Note: According to Kristianstad's history website.)
Kristianstad	Kristianstad	Vilans IP	5,000
Malmö	Malmö	Malmö Stadion	26,500
Norrköping	Norrköping	PlatinumCars Arena	17,234
Piteå	Piteå	LF Arena	6,500
Rosengård	Malmö	Malmö IP	5,700
Uppsala	Uppsala (Kungsängen)	Studenternas IP	10,522
Växjo	Växjö	Visma Arena	12,000
Vittsjö	Vittsjö	Vittsjö IP	3,000

== Champions ==
The list of Swedish champions (1973–87) and winners of the Damallsvenskan (1988–present):

From 1988 to 1992 a play-off round was played. The top four teams after the regular season played a semi-final and final.

Season	Winner	Runner-up
1973	Öxabäck IF (1)	IFK Rättvik
1974	Jitex BK (1)	Hammarby IF
1975	Öxabäck IF (2)	Jakobsbergs GoIF
1976	Jitex BK (2)	Ope IF
1977	Jakobsbergs GoIF (1)	Hammarby IF
1978	Öxabäck IF (3)	Hammarby IF
1979	Jitex BK (3)	Gideonsbergs IF
1980	Sunnanå SK (1)	Gideonsbergs IF
1981	Jitex BK (4)	Sunnanå SK
1982	Sunnanå SK (2)	Hammarby IF
1983	Öxabäck IF (4)	Hammarby IF
1984	Jitex BK (5)	Trollhättans IF
1985	Hammarby IF (1)	GAIS
1986	Malmö FF (1)	Sunnanå SK
1987	Öxabäck IF (5)	Jitex BK
1988	Öxabäck IF (6)	Jitex BK
1989	Jitex BK (6)	Malmö FF
1990	Malmö FF (2)	Öxabäck IF
1991	Malmö FF (3)	Jitex BK
1992	Gideonsbergs IF (1)	Öxabäck IF
1993	Malmö FF (4)	Jitex BK/JG93
1994	Malmö FF (5)	Hammarby IF
1995	Älvsjö AIK (1)	Gideonsbergs IF
1996	Älvsjö AIK (2)	Malmö FF
1997	Älvsjö AIK (3)	Malmö FF
1998	Älvsjö AIK (4)	Malmö FF
1999	Älvsjö AIK (5)	Malmö FF
2000	Umeå IK (1)	Malmö FF
2001	Umeå IK (2)	Malmö FF
2002	Umeå IK (3)	Malmö FF
2003	Djurgården/Älvsjö (1)	Umeå IK
2004	Djurgården/Älvsjö (2)	Umeå IK
2005	Umeå IK (4)	Malmö FF
2006	Umeå IK (5)	Djurgården/Älvsjö
2007	Umeå IK (6)	Djurgården/Älvsjö
2008	Umeå IK (7)	Linköpings FC
2009	Linköpings FC (1)	Umeå IK
2010	LdB FC Malmö (6)	Kopparbergs/Göteborg FC
2011	LdB FC Malmö (7)	Kopparbergs/Göteborg FC
2012	Tyresö FF (1)	LdB FC Malmö
2013	LdB FC Malmö (8)	Tyresö FF
2014	FC Rosengård (9)	KIF Örebro DFF
2015	FC Rosengård (10)	Eskilstuna United DFF
2016	Linköpings FC (2)	FC Rosengård
2017	Linköpings FC (3)	FC Rosengård
2018	Piteå IF (1)	Kopparbergs/Göteborg FC
2019	FC Rosengård (11)	Kopparbergs/Göteborg FC
2020	Kopparbergs/Göteborg FC (1)	FC Rosengård
2021	FC Rosengård (12)	BK Häcken
2022	FC Rosengård (13)	BK Häcken
2023	Hammarby IF (2)	BK Häcken
2024	FC Rosengård (14)	BK Häcken
2025	BK Häcken (2)	Hammarby IF
2026	BK Häcken (3)	Hammarby IF

Malmö FF (until 2005), LdB FC Malmö and FC Rosengård are the same club.

Kopparbergs/Göteborg FC became BK Häcken in 2021.

== Player records ==
=== Top scorers ===
The following is a list of top scorers (skyttedrottningar) by season. Lena Videkull has won the award a record five times, while Hanna Ljungberg holds the record for most goals in a season with 39.

Year	Goals	Player
1982	30	(Sweden) Pia Sundhage (Östers IF)
1983	35	(Sweden) Pia Sundhage (Östers IF)
1984	35	(Sweden) Lena Videkull (Trollhättans IF)
1985	19	(Sweden) Anette Nilsson (Hammarby IF)
1986	22	(Sweden) Gunilla Axén (Gideonsbergs IF)
1987	28	(Sweden) Eva-Lotta Carlsson (Dalhem IF)
1988	24	(Sweden) Lena Videkull (Öxabäck/Mark IF)
1989	25	(Sweden) Eleonor Hultin (Jitex BK)
1990	21	(Sweden) Lena Videkull (Malmö FF)
1991	28	(Sweden) Lena Videkull (Malmö FF)
1992	26	(Sweden) Anneli Andelén (Öxabäck/Mark IF)
1993	29	(Sweden) Anneli Andelén (Öxabäck/Mark IF)
1994	33	(Sweden) Anneli Andelén (Öxabäck/Mark IF)
1995	27	(Sweden) Annelie Wahlgren (Bälinge IF)
1996	23	(Sweden) Lena Videkull (Malmö FF)
1997	22	(Sweden) Annelie Wahlgren (Bälinge IF) (Sweden) Lena Videkull (Malmö FF)
1998	32	(Sweden) Victoria Svensson (Älvsjö AIK)
1999	29	(Poland) Luiza Pendyk (Malmö FF)
2000	25	(Poland) Luiza Pendyk (Malmö FF)
2001	34	(Sweden) Victoria Svensson (Älvsjö AIK)
2002	39	(Sweden) Hanna Ljungberg (Umeå IK)
2003	23	(Sweden) Victoria Svensson (Djurgården/Älvsjö)
2004	22	(Finland) Laura Kalmari (Umeå IK) (Brazil) Marta (Umeå IK)
2005	21	(Sweden) Therese Lundin (Malmö FF DFF) (Brazil) Marta (Umeå IK)
2006	21	(Sweden) Lotta Schelin (Kopparbergs/Göteborg FC)
2007	26	(Sweden) Lotta Schelin (Kopparbergs/Göteborg FC)
2008	23	(Brazil) Marta (Umeå IK) (Netherlands) Manon Melis (LdB FC Malmö)
2009	22	(Sweden) Linnea Liljegärd (Kopparbergs/Göteborg FC)
2010	25	(Netherlands) Manon Melis (LdB FC Malmö)
2011	16	(Netherlands) Manon Melis (LdB FC Malmö) (Iceland) Margrét Lára Viðarsdóttir (Kristianstads DFF)
2012	21	(Germany) Anja Mittag (LdB FC Malmö)
2013	23	(United States) Christen Press (Tyresö FF)
2014	21	(Germany) Anja Mittag (FC Rosengård)
2015	18	(Cameroon) Gaëlle Enganamouit (Eskilstuna United DFF)
2016	23	(Denmark) Pernille Harder (Linköping FC)
2017	24	(Malawi) Tabitha Chawinga (Kvarnsvedens IK)
2018	17	(Germany) Anja Mittag (FC Rosengård)
2019	14	(Sweden) Anna Anvegård (FC Rosengård)
2020	16	(Sweden) Anna Anvegård (FC Rosengård)
2021	17	(Sweden) Stina Blackstenius (BK Häcken)
2022	22	(Denmark) Amalie Vangsgaard (Linköping FC)
2023	19	(Norway) Cathinka Tandberg (Linköping FC)
2024	16	(Japan) Momoko Tanikawa (FC Rosengård)
2025	30	(Sweden) Felicia Schröder (BK Häcken)
2026	16	(Sweden) Maja Bodin (BK Häcken)

== Broadcasting rights ==
In 2016, Elitfotboll Dam launched damallsvenskan.tv. All 132 matches of the season were streamed live there through either a subscription costing 169 kronor per month or pay-per-view costing 89 kronor per match, while subscribers also received access to an archive of matches from 2015. In September, it was announced that SVT would broadcast a Damallsvenskan match.

== See also ==
- Svenska Cupen (women)
- Women's football around the world
- Diamantbollen
- List of sporting events in Sweden
