= Bälinge IF =

Swedish football club

- Full name: Bälinge Idrottsförening
- Nickname(s): BIF
- Founded: 1936
- Ground: Bälinge IP, Bälinge, Sweden
- Chairman: Staffan Persson
- League: Division 4 Uppland
- 2023: Division 4 Uppland, 3rd
Home colours	Away colours

Bälinge IF is a sports club from Bälinge, a village 10 kilometres north-west of Uppsala, Sweden.

== Background ==
Bälinge Idrottsförening was established on 15 March 1936 and is currently active in men's and ladies' football, cross-country skiing, floorball, and table tennis. In the past the club has also run an ice hockey section. In the first years of Bälinge IF's history their sportsmen wore blue and yellow team colours. It was then decided that these colours could only be used by a Swedish national team so BIF had to switch to black and yellow.

Since 1942 Bälinge IF has participated mainly in the middle and lower divisions of the Swedish football league system. The club currently plays in Division 4 Uppland which is the sixth tier of Swedish football. They play their home matches at the Bälinge IP in Bälinge.

The club is most famous for its women's football team which participated in the Women's Premier Division (Damallsvenskan) for thirteen seasons since it was established in 1978. The team has never won the Swedish championships but it contributed with players to the Swedish national team, among these Josefine Öqvist who participated in the 2004 Summer Olympics. The team now play at a much lower level: in Division 4 Uppland.

Bälinge IF women's football team played their home games at Studenternas IP Stadium in Uppsala, since the sports field in Bälinge was far too small to host premier games. The team colours are black and yellow.

Bälinge IF are affiliated to the Upplands Fotbollförbund.

== Season to season ==
=== Men's team ===
Season	Level	Division	Section	Position	Movements
1993	Tier 4	Division 3	Norra Svealand	5th	
1994	Tier 4	Division 3	Södra Norrland	10th	Relegated
1995	Tier 5	Division 4	Uppland	1st	Promoted
1996	Tier 4	Division 3	Norra Svealand	7th	
1997	Tier 4	Division 3	Norra Svealand	6th	
1998	Tier 4	Division 3	Norra Svealand	4th	
1999	Tier 4	Division 3	Norra Svealand	7th	
2000	Tier 4	Division 3	Norra Svealand	11th	Relegated
2001	Tier 5	Division 4	Uppland	3rd	
2002	Tier 5	Division 4	Uppland	3rd	
2003	Tier 5	Division 4	Uppland	1st	Promoted
2004	Tier 4	Division 3	Norra Svealand	9th	Relegated
2005	Tier 5	Division 4	Uppland	6th	
2006*	Tier 6	Division 4	Uppland	3rd	
2007	Tier 6	Division 4	Uppland	1st	Promoted
2008	Tier 5	Division 3	Norra Svealand	10th	Relegated
2009	Tier 6	Division 4	Uppland	8th	
2010	Tier 6	Division 4	Uppland	4th	
2011	Tier 6	Division 4	Uppland	2nd	
2012	Tier 6	Division 4	Uppland	1st	Promoted
2013	Tier 5	Division 3	Östra Svealand	11th	Relegated
2014	Tier 6	Division 4	Uppland	7th	
2015	Tier 6	Division 4	Uppland	5th	
2016	Tier 6	Division 4	Uppland	5th	
2017	Tier 6	Division 4	Uppland	6th	
2018	Tier 6	Division 4	Uppland	5th	
2019	Tier 6	Division 4	Uppland	10th	Relegated
2020	Tier 7	Division 5	Uppland Norra	3rd	
2021	Tier 7	Division 5	Uppland Norra	2nd	
2022	Tier 7	Division 5	Uppland Norra	1st	Promoted
2023	Tier 6	Division 4	Uppland	3rd	

* League restructuring in 2006 resulted in a new division being created at Tier 3 and subsequent divisions dropping a level.

=== Ladies' team ===
Season	Level	Division	Section	Position	Movements
1995	Tier 1	Damallsvenskan		5th	
1996	Tier 1	Damallsvenskan		6th	
1997	Tier 1	Damallsvenskan		3rd	
1998	Tier 1	Damallsvenskan		3rd	
1999	Tier 1	Damallsvenskan		5th	
2000	Tier 1	Damallsvenskan		8th	
2001	Tier 1	Damallsvenskan		7th	
2002	Tier 1	Damallsvenskan		7th	
2003	Tier 1	Damallsvenskan		5th	
2004	Tier 1	Damallsvenskan		11th	Relegated
2005	Tier 2	Division 1	Norrettan	1st	Promoted
2006	Tier 1	Damallsvenskan		9th	
2007	Tier 1	Damallsvenskan		9th	
2008	Tier 1	Damallsvenskan		12th	Relegated
2009					Withdrew
2010	Tier 5	Division 4	Uppland Västra	7th	
