= Älvsjö AIK =

Sports club in Älvsjö, Sweden

Älvsjö AIK FF
- Full name: Älvsjö Allmänna Idrottsklubb Fotbollsförening
- Founded: 1915 (Älvsjö AIK); 1993 (Älvsjö AIK FF)
- Ground: Älvsjö IP; Älvsjö; Sweden
- Coach: Nicklas Hedstål; Tommie Taimi
- League: Division 4 Stockholm Södra
- 2018: Division 4 Stockholm Södra, 3rd
Home colours	Away colours

Älvsjö AIK FF is a Swedish football club located in Älvsjö within Stockholm Municipality.

== Background ==
Älvsjö AIK was formed on 23 May 1915. The first and largest section of the newly formed club was football. Other sports played included bandy, ice hockey and floorball. Älvsjö AIK football section was reconstituted in 1993 to become their own separate club with the name Älvsjö AIK Fotbollsförening.

Since their foundation Älvsjö AIK has participated mainly in the middle and lower divisions of the Swedish football league system. The club's most successful period was from 1969 until 1974 when they competed in Division 2, which at that time was the second tier of Swedish football. The club currently plays in Division 3 Östra Svealand which is the fifth tier of Swedish football. They play their home matches at the Älvsjö IP in Älvsjö.

Älvsjö AIK FF are affiliated to the Stockholms Fotbollförbund.

The women's soccer team won the Swedish national championship in 1995, 1996, 1997, 1998 and 1999 and the Swedish national cup tournament three times, 1992, 1996 and 1999.

== Recent history ==
In recent seasons Älvsjö AIK FF have competed in the following divisions:

- 2018 - Division IV, Stockholm Södra
- 2017 - Division IV, Stockholm Södra
- 2016 - Division IV, Stockholm Mellersta
- 2015 - Division III, Södra Svealand
- 2014 – Division III, Östra Svealand
- 2013 – Division III, Östra Svealand
- 2012 – Division III, Södra Svealand
- 2011 – Division III, Södra Svealand
- 2010 – Division III, Östra Svealand
- 2009 – Division II, Södra Svealand
- 2008 – Division II, Östra Svealand
- 2008 – Division II, Södra Svealand
- 2007 – Division II, Norra Svealand
- 2006 – Division II, Norra Svealand
- 2005 – Division III, Östra Svealand
- 2004 – Division III, Östra Svealand
- 2003 – Division III, Östra Svealand
- 2002 – Division III, Östra Svealand
- 2001 – Division III, Östra Svealand
- 2000 – Division IV, Stockholm Södra
- 1999 – Division III, Östra Svealand
- 1998 – Division II, Östra Svealand
- 1997 – Division II, Östra Svealand
- 1996 – Division II, Västra Svealand
- 1995 – Division II, Östra Svealand
- 1994 – Division II, Östra Svealand
- 1993 – Division II, Östra Svealand

== Attendances ==
In recent seasons Älvsjö AIK FF have had the following average attendances:

Season	Average attendance	Division / Section	Level
2005	106	Div 3 Östra Svealand	Tier 4
2006	126	Div 2 Norra Svealand	Tier 4
2007	114	Div 2 Norra Svealand	Tier 4
2008	152	Div 2 Södra Svealand	Tier 4
2009	155	Div 2 Södra Svealand	Tier 4
2010	151	Div 3 Östra Svealand	Tier 5
2011	176	Div 3 Södra Svealand	Tier 5
2012	84	Div 3 Södra Svealand	Tier 5
2013	57	Div 3 Östra Svealand	Tier 5
2014	59	Div 3 Östra Svealand	Tier 5
2015	71	Div 3 Södra Svealand	Tier 5
2016	53	Div 4 Stockholm Mellersta	Tier 6
2017	80	Div 4 Stockholm Södra	Tier 6
2018	55	Div 4 Stockholm Södra	Tier 6
2019		Div 4 Stockholm Södra	Tier 6

* Attendances are provided in the Publikliga sections of the Svenska Fotbollförbundet website.

== Notable managers ==
- (Sweden) Sören Åkeby
- (Sweden) Göran Aral
- (Sweden) Thomas Turesson
