= Jitex BK =

- Full name: Jitex Bollklubb
- Founded: 21 January 1971
- Ground: Åbyvallen, Mölndal
- Capacity: 1,500
- Manager: Anders Holmvén
- League: Elitettan
- 2025: 6th of 14
- Website: http://www.jitex.se
Home colours

Jitex BK, more commonly known as just Jitex, is a football club in Mölndal, Sweden, that competes in Elitettan, the second tier of Swedish women's football. The club was founded January 21, 1971 and previously played in the Elitettan, Sweden's second highest division, and the top division league, the Damallsvenskan.

Jitex won six national championships and three victories in the Swedish Cup during the 1970s and 1980s. The Jitex name came from the first sponsor; Jitex fashion house. The team which has become known for their characteristic purple kit, was first trained by Sven Lundbeck. Notable players during this successful era include Anette Börjesson, Elisabeth Leidinge, Anna Svenjeby and Pia Sundhage.

Financial problems in the early 1990s saw a 1993 merger with local rivals GAIS (Göteborgs Atlet- och Idrottssällskap or Gothenburg Athletics and Sports Association in English) and the adoption of the name Jitex BK/JG93. The team stumbled out of the Damallsvenskan in 1997. After reverting to the original name and transforming the team, the club has since climbed back up the leagues. Following victory in the 2005 Söderettan, the team played in the Damallsvenskan for 2006, but were relegated again the same year. In 2009 Jitex returned to the Damallsvenskan ahead of the 2010 campaign. Jitex were relegated from the Damallsvenskan in 2014, losing all 20 league games, scoring just 6 goals and conceding 61 goals.

The club also plays futsal. In March 2017, the Girls' 17 team won the Swedish Championship by defeating Borgeby FK, 2–1, in the final game in Helsingborg.

== Current squad ==
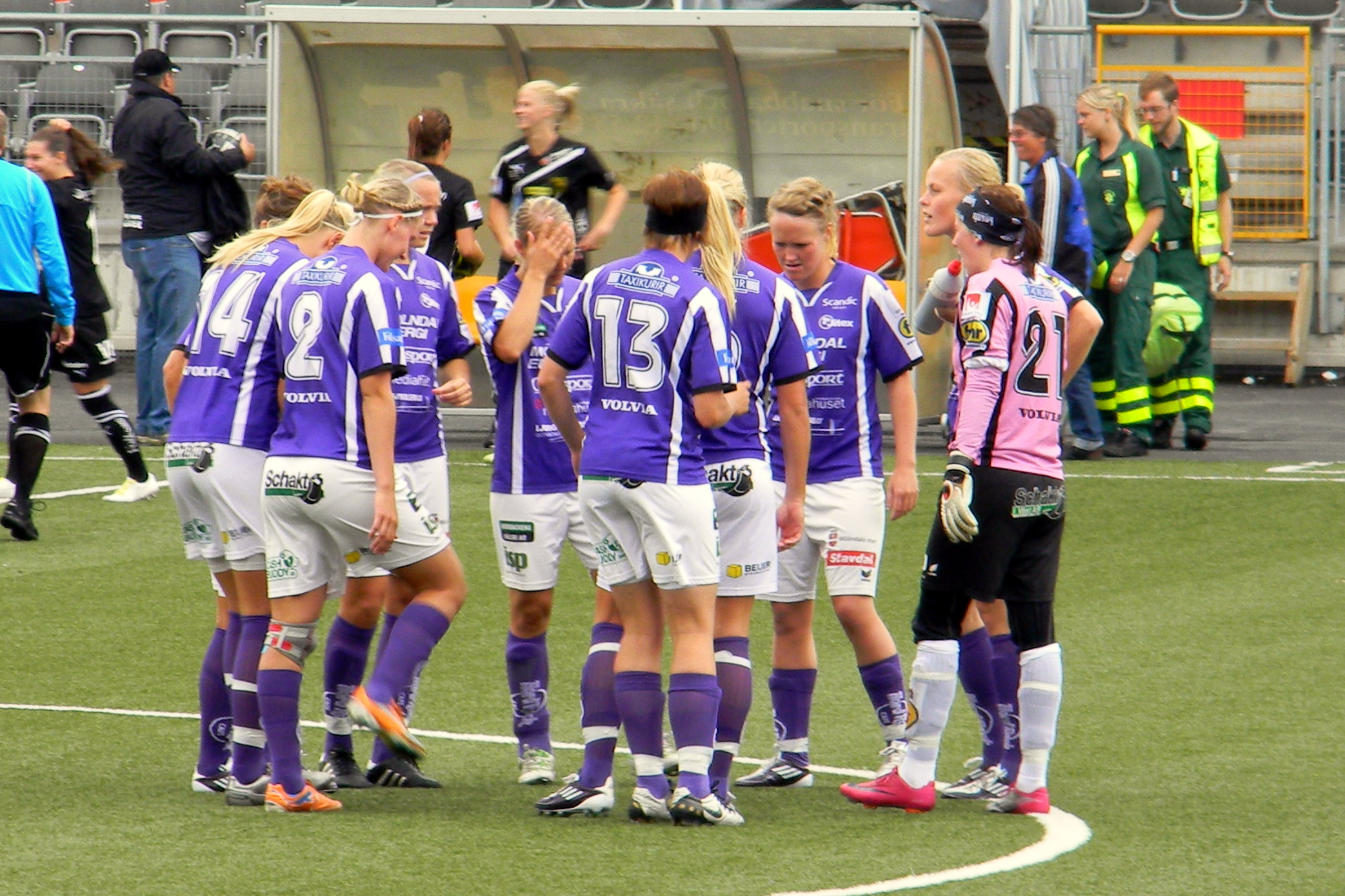
Before a match with Umeå IK in 2011

As of 6 May 2024.

Note: Flags indicate national team as defined under FIFA eligibility rules; some limited exceptions apply. Players may hold more than one non-FIFA nationality.

No.	Pos.	Nation	Player
1	GK	SWE	Klara Tidblom
2	DF	SWE	Elin Palklint (captain)
3	DF	NOR	Synne Vatshelle Raa
3	DF	SWE	Malva Larsson
6	MF	SWE	Felicia Torstensson
6	MF	SWE	Vilma Rydell
7	MF	SWE	Wilma Bergman
9	MF	SWE	Selma Cruse
10	MF	SWE	Olivia Alcaide
11	MF	SWE	Tindra Ivarsson Lidström

No.	Pos.	Nation	Player
12	MF	SWE	Kiara Svensson Senelius
13	MF	SWE	Thea Höglund
15	FW	SWE	Magda Le Therisien
16	DF	SWE	Linnea Folkow
17	MF	SWE	Isabella Veiszhaupt
18	DF	SWE	Hanna Comnell
21	MF	SWE	Vendela Stenberg
23	MF	SWE	Ella Smith Ygfeldt
24	FW	SWE	Amanda Ebbesson
99	GK	SWE	Anna Larsson

=== Former players ===
For notable current and former players, see Category:Jitex BK players.
