= Linköping FC =

Association football club in Linköping, Sweden

- Full name: Linköping Football Club
- Short name: LFC
- Founded: 2003; 23 years ago
- Ground: Linköping Arena, Linköping
- Capacity: 7,400
- Chairman: Maria Hagström
- Manager: Charlie Mitchell
- League: Elitettan
- 2025: 13th, Damallsvenskan (relegated)
- Website: https://www.linkopingfc.com/
Home colours	Away colours

Linköping Football Club (Swedish: [ˈlɪnːˌɕøːpɪŋ]) is an association football club from Linköping, Sweden. The club was established in 2003 when Kenty DFF women's football club decided to merge with the premier division ice hockey club Linköping HC under the new name Linköping FC. The club's goal was both to establish women's football as a sport in Linköping and eventually become one of the top four teams.

== History ==
In 2004, Linköping FC finished their first year in the women's premier division (Damallsvenskan) in sixth place. In the following two seasons, the club reached its goal of finishing top four in the league with a fourth-place finish in 2005 and a third-place finish in 2006. The club also won Svenska Cupen ("The Swedish Cup") for the first time in 2006, defeating Umeå IK 3–2 in the cup final. They finished sixth in 2007, falling short of their ambition to rank among the top four. In 2008 they led a long time through the series but still they finished second behind Swedish giants Umeå IK. Though, some consolation came when they won Svenska Cupen the same season, beating Umeå 1–0 in the final.

From 2004 to 2007 Linköping FC increased their annual turnover from 2,4 million SEK to 5,0 million SEK. At the same time their average attendance dropped from 1,609 in the 2004 season to 997 in 2006. In 2007, Frida Östberg left the team after two years. Later, the team signed Jessica Landström after her debut for the national team. In February, they signed Brazilian internationals Cristiane and Daniela.

In 2025, Linköping FC were relegated to the Elitettan for the first time in history.

== Current squad ==
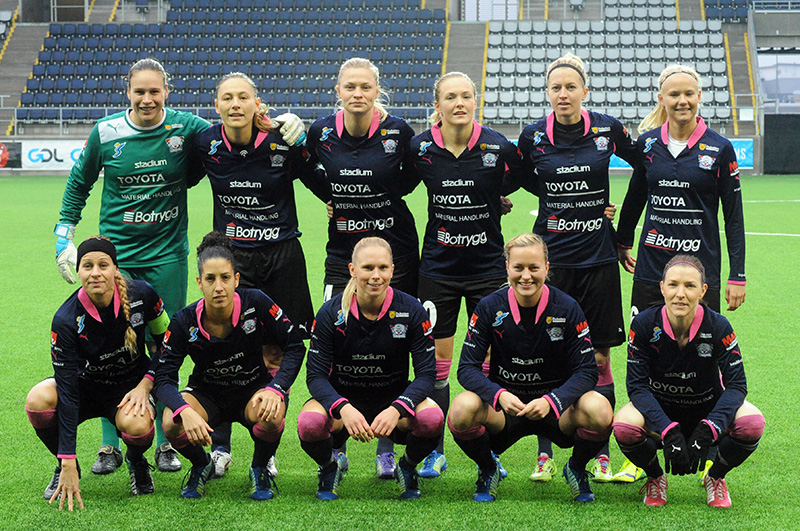
Linköping FC team in November 2014

Former club logo

As of 5 June 2025.

Note: Flags indicate national team as defined under FIFA eligibility rules; some limited exceptions apply. Players may hold more than one non-FIFA nationality.

No.	Pos.	Nation	Player
1	GK	SWE	Cajsa Andersson
3	DF	AUS	Polly Doran
6	MF	NOR	Noor Eckhoff
8	MF	SWE	Sara Eriksson
9	MF	SWE	Ronja Osman-Ingberg
10	DF	SWE	Emma Lennartsson
11	FW	ISL	Maria Ólafsdóttir Grós
12	DF	SWE	Emma Aldén
13	FW	SWE	Ella Lundin
14	MF	SWE	Irene Dirdal

No.	Pos.	Nation	Player
15	FW	SWE	Lisa Björk
17	MF	USA	Talia Gabarra
16	DF	NOR	Malin Brenn
18	MF	SWE	Michelle De Jongh
20	GK	SWE	Clara Wiklund
23	FW	NED	Eshly Bakker
24	FW	SWE	Tyra Andersson
25	DF	SWE	Jonna Andersson
33	FW	SWE	Lilli Halltunen
71	MF	FIN	Vilma Koivisto

=== Out on loan ===
Note: Flags indicate national team as defined under FIFA eligibility rules; some limited exceptions apply. Players may hold more than one non-FIFA nationality.

No.	Pos.	Nation	Player

=== Former players ===
For details of current and former players, see Category:Linköpings FC players.

== Achievements ==
- Damallsvenskan
  - Winners (3): 2009, 2016, 2017
- Svenska Cupen:
  - Winners (5): 2006, 2008, 2009, 2013–14, 2014–15

== Record in UEFA Women's Champions League ==
All results (away, home and aggregate) list Linköping's goal tally first.

Competition	Round	Club	Away	Home	Aggregate
2009–2010	Qualifying round	(Moldova) Roma Calfa	–	11–0	–
2009–2010	Qualifying round	(Northern Ireland) Glentoran Belfast United	–	3–0	–
2009–2010	Qualifying round	(Romania) Clujana Cluj-Napoca	–	6–0	–
2009–2010	Round of 32	(Switzerland) FC Zürich	2–0 ^{f}	3–0	5–0
2009–2010	Round of 16	(Germany) Duisburg	1–1 ^{f}	0–2	1–3
2010–2011	Round of 32	(Slovenia) Krka Novo Mesto	7–0 ^{f}	5–0	12–0
2010–2011	Round of 16	(Czech Republic) Sparta Prague	1–0	2–0 ^{f}	3–0
2010–2011	Quarter-final	(England) Arsenal	1–1 ^{f}	2–2	3–3 (agr)
2014–2015	Round of 32	(England) Liverpool FC	1–2 ^{f}	3–0	4–2
2014–2015	Round of 16	(Russia) Zvezda Perm	0–3	5–0 ^{f}	5–3
2014–2015	Quarter-final	(Denmark) Brøndby	1–1	0–1 ^{f}	1–2
2017–2018	Round of 32	(Cyprus) Apollon Limassol	1–0 ^{f}	3–0	4–0
2017–2018	Round of 16	(Czech Republic) Sparta Prague	1–1 ^{f}	3–0	4–1
2017–2018	Quarter-final	(England) Manchester City	0–2 ^{f}	3–5	3–7
2018–2019	Round of 32	(Ukraine) Zhytlobud-1 Kharkiv	6–1 ^{f}	4–0	10–1
2018–2019	Round of 16	(France) Paris Saint-Germain	2–3	0–2 ^{f}	2–5
2023–2024	Qualifying round 1	(England) Arsenal	0–3		
2023–2024	Qualifying round 1	(Ukraine) FC Kryvbas Kryvyi Rih	3–0		
2024–2025	Qualifying round 1	(Czech Republic) Sparta Prague	1–3 (aet)		
2024–2025	Qualifying round 1	(Austria) First Vienna	8–0		

^{f} First leg.

== See also ==
- List of Linköpings FC seasons
