= Sunnanå SK =

- Full name: Sunnanå Sportklubb
- Nickname(s): SSK
- Founded: 1939
- Ground: Norrvalla IP, Skellefteå
- Capacity: 10.000
- Chairman: Åke Stighäll
- Manager: Fredrik Markström
- League: Elitettan
- 2024: Elitettan, 6th of 14
Home colours	Away colours

Sunnanå SK is a football club from Skellefteå, Sweden who in 2024 plays in Elitettan, the second highest division of women's football in Sweden. The club was established in 1939 and the women's division was added in 1974. Sunnanå has played many seasons in the Women's premier division (Damallsvenskan) and hold two championship gold medals (1980,1982).

Sunnanå SK play their home games at Norrvalla Stadium in Skellefteå. The team colours are blue and white. The club is affiliated to the Västerbottens Fotbollförbund.

The club also plays futsal. In March 2017, the Boys' 17 team won the Swedish Championship by defeating IK Oddevold, 3–1, in the final game in Helsingborg.

== Current squad ==
As of 8 May 2024.

Note: Flags indicate national team as defined under FIFA eligibility rules; some limited exceptions apply. Players may hold more than one non-FIFA nationality.

No.	Pos.	Nation	Player
1	GK	(Finland) FIN	Josefina Långström
2	MF	(Sweden) SWE	Klara Lindbäck
3	DF	(Sweden) SWE	Fanny Wiklund
4	DF	(Sweden) SWE	Emma Burman
5	DF	(Sweden) SWE	Thelma Heikkinen
6	DF	(Sweden) SWE	Lina Pettersson
7	MF	(Sweden) SWE	Tilda Sahlman (captain)
8	MF	(Sweden) SWE	Thelma Gustavsson
9	FW	(Sweden) SWE	Hedvig Hedlund
10	FW	(Denmark) DEN	Sandra Leegaard Jakobsen
11	MF	(Sweden) SWE	Alva Öhgren

No.	Pos.	Nation	Player
12	MF	(Spain) ESP	Andrea Villar
13	MF	(Sweden) SWE	Wilma Lundqvist
14	MF	(Sweden) SWE	Klara Andersson
17	MF	(Sweden) SWE	Tindra Dahlqvist
18	MF	(Sweden) SWE	Alice Gustavsson
19	MF	(Sweden) SWE	Linn Andersson Lundin
20	FW	(Sweden) SWE	Wilma Dahlgren
23	MF	(Sweden) SWE	Vide Forslund
24	GK	(Sweden) SWE	Lisa Sjögren
25	MF	(Sweden) SWE	Sofia Lindmark
27	DF	(Sweden) SWE	Anna Larsson

== Honours ==
=== League ===
- Division 1 / Damallsvenskan
- Winners (2): 1980, 1982

=== Invitational ===
- Menton Tournament (1): 1981
