= Nilla Fischer =

Swedish footballer (born 1984)

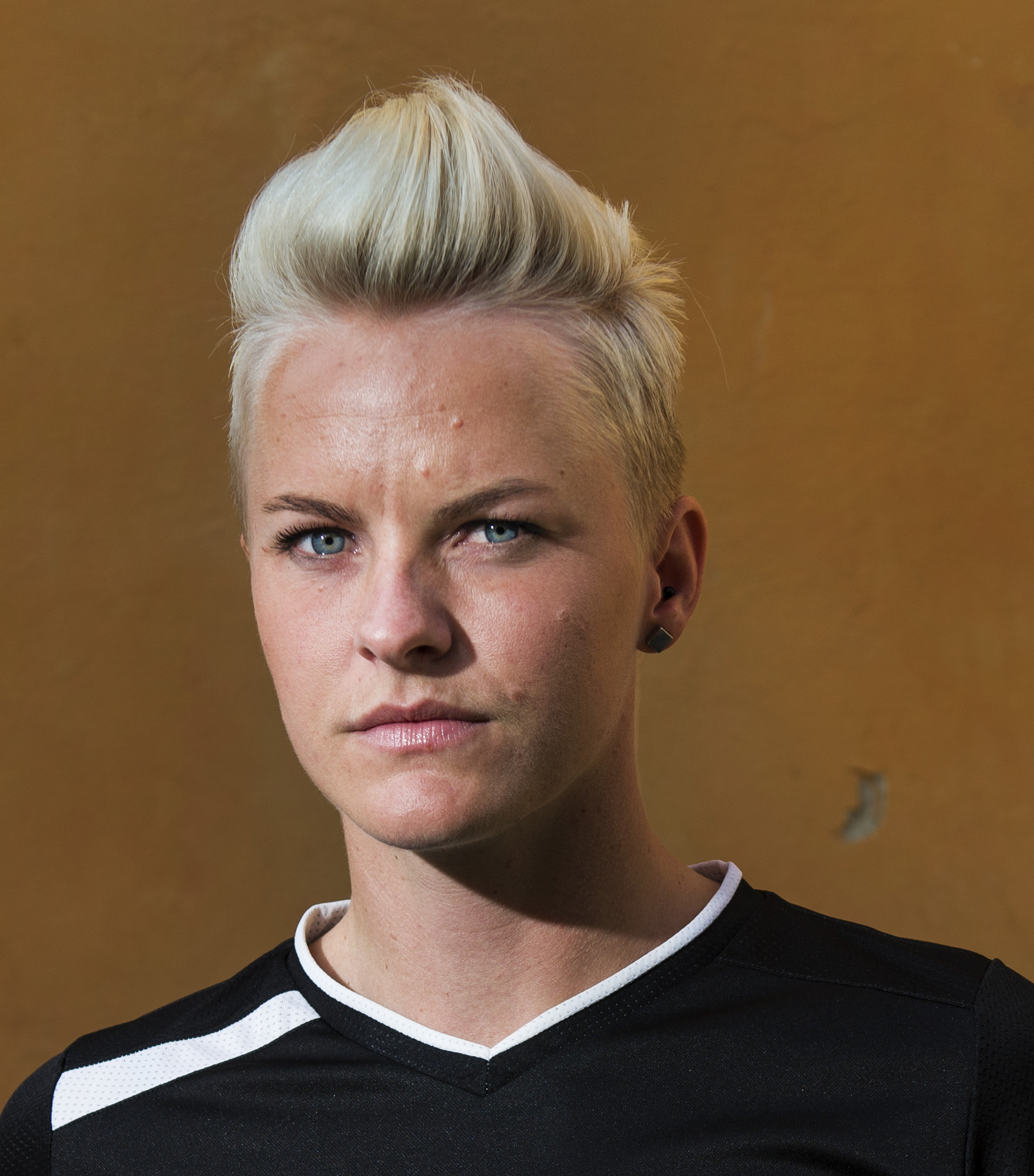
- Fischer in 2013

Personal information
- Full name: Åsa Nilla Maria Fischer
- Date of birth: 2 August 1984 (age 42)
- Place of birth: Kristianstad, Sweden
- Height: 1.75 m (5 ft 9 in)
- Positions: Centre-back; defensive midfielder

Youth career
- Verums GoIF

Senior career*
Years	Team	Apps	(Gls)
1998–2000	Vittsjö GIK		(0)
2000–2003	Kristianstad/Wä DFF		(0)
2003–2011	LdB FC Malmö	136	(24)
2012–2013	Linköping FC	33	(2)
2013–2019	VfL Wolfsburg	125	(11)
2019–2022	Linköping FC	49	(2)

International career
2000–2001	Sweden U17	12	(3)
2001–2004	Sweden U20	24	(4)
2001–2022	Sweden	189 (Note: According to her profile on the Swedish Football Association's website, Fischer's total number of caps is 188, but this appears to be a mistake, as the number which was communicated after her retirement was 189.)	(23)
Medal record
Women's soccer
Representing Sweden
FIFA Women's World Cup
Bronze medal – third place	2011 Germany	Team
Bronze medal – third place	2019 France	Team
Olympic Games
Silver medal – second place	2016 Rio de Janeiro	Team
- * Club domestic league appearances and goals

Åsa Nilla Maria Fischer (born 2 August 1984) is a Swedish former professional footballer who played for LdB FC Malmö (now known as FC Rosengård), Linköping FC, VfL Wolfsburg and the Sweden women's national team.

== Early life ==
Fischer was born in a small village outside Kristianstad, Sweden, and has a twin brother.

== Club career ==
=== Early career ===
Fischer began playing professionally at just 14, with Division 1 team Vittsjö GIK.

In 2000, Fischer left Vittsjö to sign with hometown team Kristianstad/Wä DFF in the Damallsvenskan. The team were relegated to Division 1 at the end of the season.

=== LdB FC Malmö ===
Fischer signed for LdB FC Malmö (now known as FC Rosengård) in 2003. With the club, she won back-to-back Damallsvenskan titles in 2010 and 2011.

=== Linköping FC ===
In October 2011, it was announced that Fischer would join fellow Damallsvenskan club Linköping FC on a two-year contract.

=== VfL Wolfsburg ===
In 2013, Fischer agreed a contract with VfL Wolfsburg of the Frauen-Bundesliga from 1 January 2014. She was, however, released early by Linköping, allowing her to join Wolfsburg in August 2013. She made her debut for the club during the Bundesliga 2013–14 season opener against Bayern Munich on 7 September 2013.

With Wolfsburg, she won the 2013–14 Champions League and finished as runner-up in the 2015–16 and 2017–18 competitions. Alongside the Champions League title, Fischer won the Frauen-Bundesliga four times and secured the DFB Pokal five times. She acted as captain of the team.

=== Return to Linköping ===
Fischer returned to Linköping FC in 2019, following six seasons playing in Germany's Frauen-Bundesliga.

In December 2022, Fischer announced her retirement from playing.

== International career ==
Fischer made her senior debut against Norway in January 2001. She played mostly as a defensive midfielder before transitioning into a centre back, a change cemented under Pia Sundhage in 2013. This change in position coincided with an upturn in goalscoring form for Fischer, who scored three times for Sweden at the home UEFA Women's Euro 2013, earning her the Silver Boot.

Fischer represented Sweden in four World Cups (China 2007, Germany 2011, Canada 2015, France 2019) and three Olympic Games (Beijing 2008, London 2012, Rio 2016.) Across these tournaments, Sweden finished in third place at two World Cups (2011 and 2019), and won a silver medal in Rio.

On 28 March 2022, Fischer announced through her Instagram that she wouldn't take part in the forthcoming UEFA Women's Euro 2022.

On 27 September 2022, Fischer announced her retirement from international play.

== Off the pitch ==
Fischer married her partner Mariah-Michaela (known as Mika) in December 2013. The pair share two children, born in 2017 and 2021 respectively.

Fischer is an ambassador for LGBT rights, and has spoken publicly about being a gay woman playing football. She was the first player in Germany to wear a rainbow coloured captain's armband.

In June 2019, alongside Kosovare Asllani, Hedvig Lindahl, and Caroline Seger, Fischer was honoured with a statue as part of a partnership between Coca-Cola and the Swedish Football Association. Fischer's statue – placed in Linköping – was found toppled shortly after being unveiled.

In her autobiography Jag Sa inte ens Hälften (I Didn't Even Say Half of It), Fischer revealed that Swedish national team players were made to expose their genitalia to medical officials as part of gender tests at the 2011 Women's World Cup.

She is a Liverpool fan.

Fischer graduated from the Swedish police academy in July 2025, and started working full-time as a police officer.

== Career statistics ==
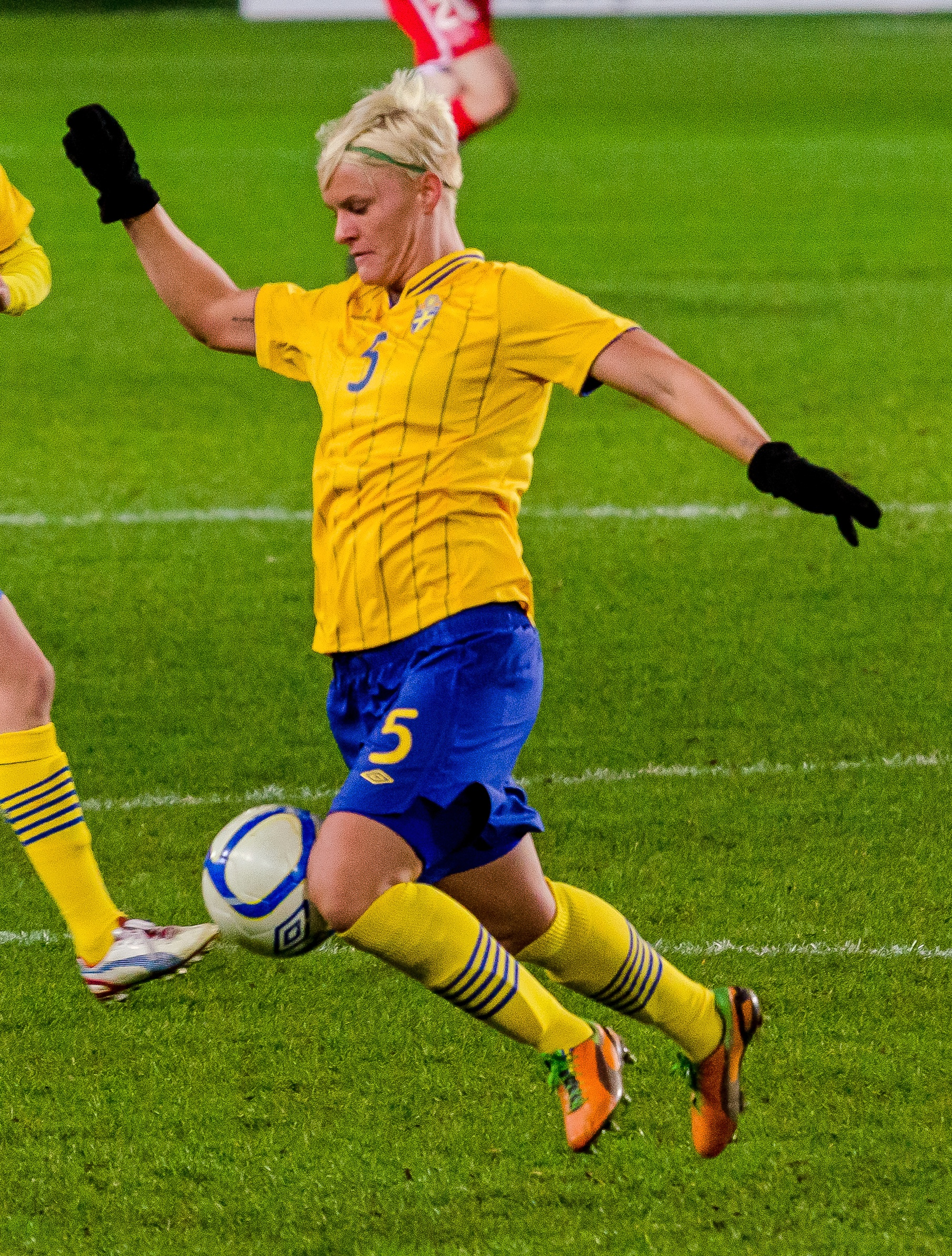
Fischer playing for Sweden in 2012

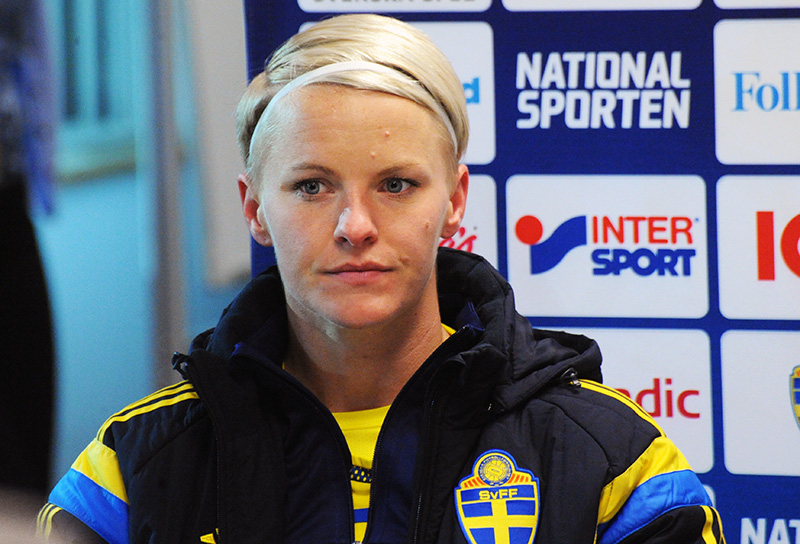
Fischer in 2015

Scores and results list Sweden's goal tally first, score column indicates score after each Fischer goal.

List of international goals scored by Nilla Fischer
No.	Date	Venue	Opponent	Score	Result	Competition
1	27 February 2007	Larnaca, Cyprus	Scotland	1–0	1–0	Friendly
3	5 March 2008	Lagos, Portugal	Finland	2–0	3–1	2008 Algarve Cup
4	3 May 2008	Székesfehérvár, Hungary	Hungary	4–0	6–0	Euro 2009 qualifying
7	6 March 2009	Lagos, Portugal	Finland	1–0	1–0	2009 Algarve Cup
8	9 March 2009	Faro, Portugal	Germany	1–0	3–2	2009 Algarve Cup
9	3 March 2010	Albufeira, Portugal	China	2–0	2–0	2010 Algarve Cup
10	31 March 2010	Broughton, Flintshire, Wales	Wales	1–0	4–0	2011 World Cup qualification
11	6 July 2001	Wolfsburg, Germany	United States	2–0	2–1	2011 FIFA Women's World Cup
12	17 January 2012	La Manga, Spain	Norway	1–0	2–0	Friendly
13	25 July 2012	Coventry, Great Britain	South Africa	1–0	4–1	Olympics 2012
19	12 February 2015	Uusimaa, Finland	Finland	3–0	3–0	Friendly
21	3 August 2016	Rio de Janeiro, Brazil	South Africa	1–0	1–0	Olympics 2016
22	8 March 2017	Albufeira, Portugal	Russia	2–0	4–0	2017 Algarve Cup
23	24 October 2017	Borås, Sweden	Hungary	2–0	5–0	2019 World Cup qualification

Key (expand for notes on "world cup and olympic goals")
Location	Geographic location of the venue where the competition occurred
Lineup	Start – played entire match on minute (off player) – substituted on at the minute indicated, and player was substituted off at the same time off minute (on player) – substituted off at the minute indicated, and player was substituted on at the same time (c) – captain
Min	The minute in the match the goal was scored. For list that include caps, blank indicates played in the match but did not score a goal.
Assist/pass	The ball was passed by the player, which assisted in scoring the goal. This column depends on the availability and source of this information.
penalty or pk	Goal scored on penalty-kick which was awarded due to foul by opponent. (Goals scored in penalty-shoot-out, at the end of a tied match after extra-time, are not included.)
Score	The match score after the goal was scored.
Result	The final score. W – match was won L – match was lost to opponent D – match was drawn (W) – penalty-shoot-out was won after a drawn match (L) – penalty-shoot-out was lost after a drawn match
aet	The score at the end of extra-time; the match was tied at the end of 90' regulation
pso	Penalty-shoot-out score shown in parentheses; the match was tied at the end of extra-time
	Pink background color – Olympic women's football tournament
	Blue background color – FIFA women's world cup final tournament

Goal	Match	Date	Location	Opponent	Lineup	Min	Score	Result	Competition
China 2007 FIFA Women's World Cup
	1	2007-9-14	Chengdu	United States	on 65' (off Sjögran)			0–2 L	Group match
	2	2007-9-18	Tianjin	North Korea	Start			2–1 W	Group match
(China) Beijing 2008 Women's Olympic Football Tournament
	3	2008-8-6	Tianjin	China	off 76' (on Landström)			1–2 L	Group match
1	4	2008-8-9	Tianjin	Argentina	Start	58	1–0	1–0 W	Group match
	5	2008-8-12	Beijing	Canada	off 27' (on Landström)			2–1 W	Group match
Germany 2011 FIFA Women's World Cup
	6	2011-6-28	Leverkusen	Colombia	on 69' (off Seger)			1–0 W	Group match
	7	2011-7-2	Augsburg	North Korea	on 86' (off Sjögran)			1–0 W	Group match
2	8	2011-7-6	Wolfsburg	United States	off 88' (on Sembrant)	35	2–0	2–1 W	Group match
	9	2011-7-10	Augsburg	Australia	on 67' (off Forsberg)			3–1 W	Quarter-final
	10	2011-7-16	Sinsheim	France	off 73' (on Sembrant)			2–1 W	Third place match
(United Kingdom) London 2012 Women's Olympic Football Tournament
3	11	2012-7-25	Coventry	South Africa	off 61' (on Almgren)	7	1–0	4–1 W	Group match
	12	2012-7-31	Newcastle	Canada	off 53' (on Dahlkvist)			2–2 D	Group match
4	13	2012-8-3	Glasgow	France	Start	18	1–0	1–2 L	Quarter-final
Canada 2015 FIFA Women's World Cup
5	14	2015-6-8	Winnipeg	Nigeria	Start	31	2–0	3–3 D	Group match
	15	2015-6-12	Winnipeg	United States	Start			0–0 D	Group match
	16	2015-6-16	Edmonton	Australia	Start			1–1 D	Group match
	17	2015-6-20	Ottawa	Germany	Start			1–4 L	Round of 16
(Brazil) Rio de Janeiro 2016 Women's Olympic Football Tournament
6	18	2016-8-3	Rio de Janeiro	South Africa	Start	76	1–0	1–0 W	Group match
	19	2016-8-6	Rio de Janeiro	Brazil	Start			1–5 L	Group match
	20	2016-8-9	Brasília	China	off 78' (on Berglund)			0–0 D	Group match
	21	2016-8-12	Brasília	United States	Start			1–1 (pso 4–3) (W)	Quarter-final
	22	2016-8-16	Rio de Janeiro	Brazil	Start			0–0 (pso 4–3) (W)	Semi-final
	23	2016-8-19	Rio de Janeiro	Germany	Start			1–2 L	Gold Medal Match
France 2019 FIFA Women's World Cup
	24	2019-6-11	Rennes	Chile	Start			2–1 W	Group match
	25	2019-6-16	Nice	Thailand	Start			5–1 W	Group match
	26	2019-6-24	Paris	Canada	Start			1–0 W	Round of 16
	27	2019-6-29	Rennes	Germany	off 66' (on Ilestedt)			2–1 W	Quarter-final
	28	2019-7-3	Lyon	Netherlands	Start			0–1 L	Semi-final
	29	2019-7-6	Nice	England	Start			2–1 W	3rd place match

== Honours ==
LdB FC Malmö

- Damallsvenskan: 2010, 2011
- Svenska Supercupen: 2011

VfL Wolfsburg

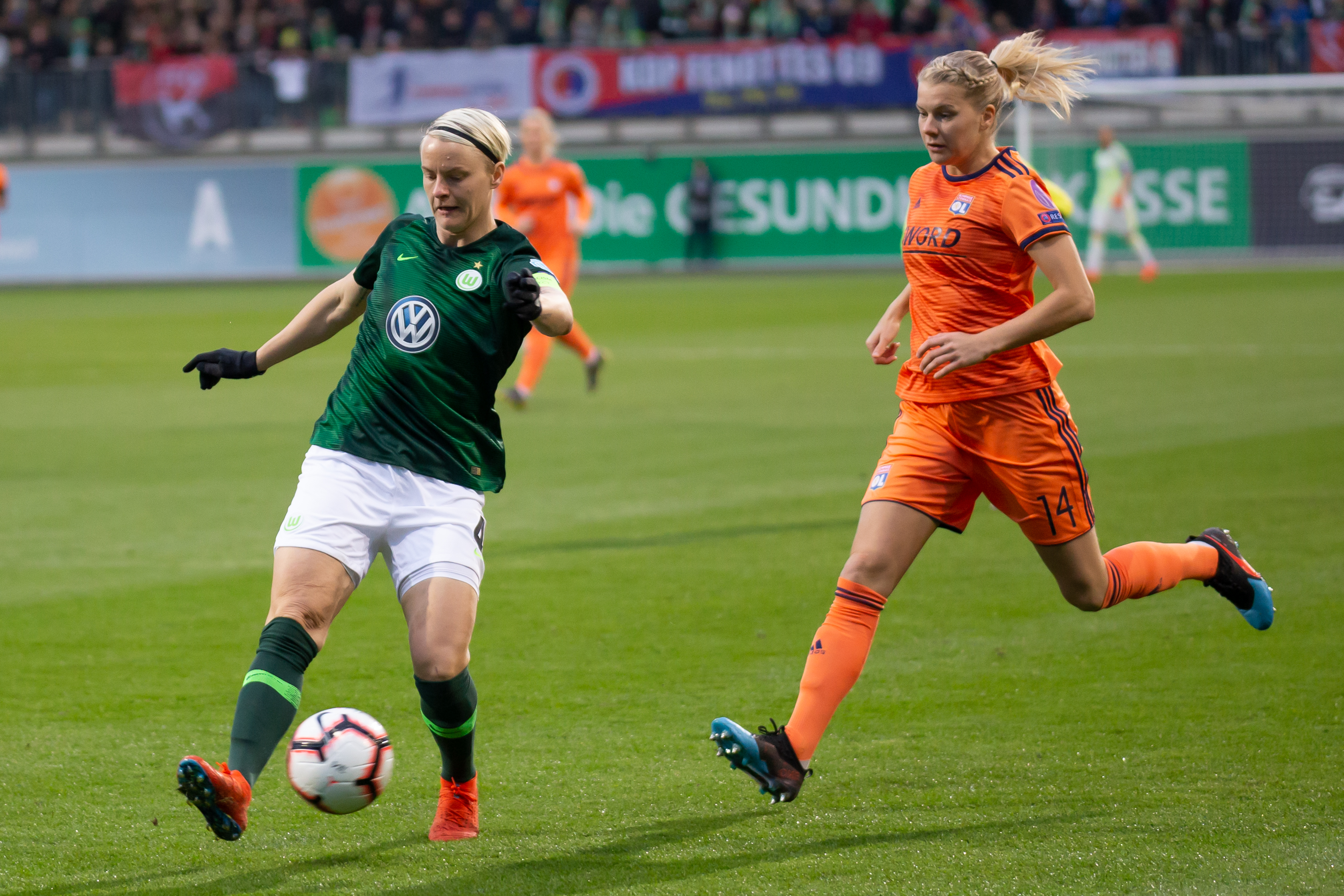
Fischer (left) playing for VfL Wolfsburg in 2019

- UEFA Women's Champions League: 2013–14
- Bundesliga: 2013–14, 2016–17, 2017–18, 2018–19
- DFB-Pokal: 2014–15, 2015–16, 2016–17, 2017–18, 2018–19

Sweden

- FIFA Women's World Cup third place: 2011, 2019
- Summer Olympics silver medal: 2016
- Algarve Cup: 2009

Sweden U19

- Nordic Cup runner-up: 2004

Sweden U17

- Nordic Cup: 2000; runner-up 2001

Individual

- UEFA Women's Championship Silver Boot: 2013
- UEFA Women's Championship All Star Team: 2013
- Fotbollsgalan Best female defense in Sweden: 2013, 2014
- UEFA Best Women's Player in Europe Award third place: 2014
- FIFA FIFPro World XI: 2016
- IFFHS World's Woman Team of the Decade 2011–2020
- IFFHS UEFA Woman Team of the Decade 2011–2020
