= 2011 FIFA Women's World Cup qualification – UEFA Group 8 =

Football tournament qualification stage

The UEFA Group 8 qualification for the 2011 FIFA Women's World Cup was a UEFA qualifying group for the 2011 FIFA Women's World Cup. The group comprised Sweden, the Czech Republic, Belgium, Wales and Azerbaijan.

Sweden won the group and advanced to the play-off rounds.

== Standings ==
Team	Pld	W	D	L	GF	GA	GD	Pts	Sweden	Czech Republic	Belgium	Wales	Azerbaijan
Sweden	8	7	1	0	36	3	+33	22	—	0–0	2–1	5–1	17–0
Czech Republic	8	4	1	3	19	6	+13	13	0–1	—	1–2	2–1	8–0
Belgium	8	3	1	4	18	13	+5	10	1–4	0–3	—	2–3	11–0
Wales	8	3	0	5	23	16	+7	9	0–4	2–0	0–1	—	15–0
Azerbaijan	8	1	1	6	2	60	−58	4	0–3	0–5	0–0	2–1	—

== Results ==
20 September 2009
15:00 UTC+1

Wales	0–1	Belgium
	Report	Verelst 90+4'

Bridge Meadow Stadium, Haverfordwest
Referee: Ann-Helen Østervold (Norway)

23 September 2009
18:00 UTC+2

Sweden	2–1	Belgium
Asllani 30'; Landström 66'	Report	Maes 68'

Gamla Ullevi, Gothenburg
Referee: Esther Staubli (Switzerland)
23 September 2009
19:00 UTC+1

Wales	2–0	Czech Republic
Fishlock 16'; Plewa 84'	Report

Stebonheath Park, Llanelli
Referee: Hilal Tuba Tosun Ayer (Turkey)

24 October 2009
14:00 UTC+5

Azerbaijan	0–3	Sweden
	Report	Seger 38', 80'; Landström 59'

Ismet Qaibov Stadium, Baku
Referee: Carina Susanna Vitulano (Italy)

25 October 2009
14:00 UTC+1

Czech Republic	2–1	Wales
Pincová 8', 22'	Report	Fishlock 17'

Ďolíček Stadion, Prague
Referee: Gyöngyi Krisztina Gaál (Hungary)

28 October 2009
14:00 UTC+4

Azerbaijan	2–1	Wales
Atayeva 33'; Kaziyeva 43'	Report	Lander 29'

Ismet Qaibov Stadium, Baku
Referee: Marija Margareta Damjanović (Croatia)
28 October 2009
20:00 UTC+1

Belgium	1–4	Sweden
Maes 71'	Report	Seger 23', 65'; Landström 67'; Lindén 86'

Den Dreef, Heverlee
Referee: Efthalia Mitsi (Greece)

22 November 2009
14:00 UTC+4

Azerbaijan	0–0	Belgium
	Report

Ismet Qaibov Stadium, Baku
Referee: Gordana Kuzmanović (Serbia)

26 November 2009
14:00 UTC+1

Czech Republic	1–2	Belgium
Pivoňková 69'	Report	Verelst 24'; Maes 27'

Městský sportovní areál, Písek
Referee: Yuliya Medvedeva-Keldyusheva (Kazakhstan)

27 March 2010
14:00 UTC+4

Azerbaijan	0–5	Czech Republic
	Report	Nepokojova 11'; Divišová 21'; Heroldová 43'; Mocová 53'; Krůzová 87'

Tofik Bakhramov Stadium, Baku
Referee: Florence Guillemin (France)

28 March 2010
16:00 UTC+2

Belgium	2–3	Wales
Philtjens 64'; Zeler 72'	Report	Dykes 19'; Daley 42' (pen.); Jones 90+1'

Edmond Machtens Stadium, Brussels
Referee: Elia María Martínez Martínez (Spain)

31 March 2010
19:00 UTC+1

Wales	0–4	Sweden
	Report	Fischer 69'; Liljegärd 78'; Paulson 85'; Landström 90'

The Airfield, Broughton
Referee: Natalia Avdonchenko (Russia)

1 April 2010
20:00 UTC+2

Belgium	0–3	Czech Republic
	Report	Divišová 29', 44', 49'

Edmond Machtens Stadium, Brussels
Referee: Natalia Aleksakhina (Ukraine)

19 June 2010
17:00 UTC+2

Belgium	11–0	Azerbaijan
De Cock 3', 11', 40', 42'; Philtjens 10', 26'; Heiremans 18', 54'; Onzia 35', 90+1'; Puttemans 89'	Report

Stade Leburton, Tubize
Referee: Eun Ah Hong (South Korea)
19 June 2010
18:00 UTC+2

Sweden	0–0	Czech Republic
	Report

Gamla Ullevi, Gothenburg
Referee: Tanja Schett (Austria)

23 June 2010
18:00 UTC+2

Sweden	17–0	Azerbaijan
Mirzaguliyeva 19' (o.g.); Forsberg 25', 31'; Sjögran 33', 60'; Seger 41', 45+1'; Liljegärd 44', 49', 62'; Landström 52', 66'; Asllani 55'; Asadova 63' (o.g.); Lindén 72', 78'; Paulson 72'	Report

Gamla Ullevi, Gothenburg
Referee: Sandra Braz Bastos (Portugal)

21 August 2010
14:00 UTC+2

Czech Republic	0–1	Sweden
	Report	Seger 26'

Ďolíček Stadion, Prague
Referee: Alexandra Ihringova (England)
21 August 2010
15:00 UTC+1

Wales	15–0	Azerbaijan
Lander 3', 7', 21', 36', 38', 72'; Harries 13', 56', 66'; Dutton 19'; Fishlock 59'; Ingle 65'; Green 81', 83'; Manley 90+2'	Report

Latham Park, Newtown
Referee: Paloma Quintero Siles (Spain)

25 August 2010
17:00 UTC+2

Czech Republic	8–0	Azerbaijan
Divišová 6', 43'; Mocová 7'; Pivoňková 14', 57'; Martínková 17', 61'; Došková 54'	Report

Stadion Na Chvalech, Prague
Referee: Aneliya Sinabova (Bulgaria)
25 August 2010
18:00 UTC+2

Sweden	5–1	Wales
Schelin 12', 60'; Öqvist 45', 55', 71'	Report	Harries 81'

Värendsvallen, Växjö
Referee: Silvia Tea Spinelli (Italy)
