= Football at the 2016 Summer Olympics – Women's tournament =

2016 Women's Olympic Football Tournament

Tournament details
- Host country: Brazil
- Dates: 3–19 August
- Teams: 12 (from 6 confederations)
- Venues: 7 (in 6 host cities)

Final positions
- Champions: Germany (1st title)
- Runners-up: Sweden
- Third place: Canada
- Fourth place: Brazil

Tournament statistics
- Matches played: 26
- Goals scored: 66 (2.54 per match)
- Attendance: 635,885 (24,457 per match)
- Top scorer: (Germany) Melanie Behringer (5 goals)
- Fair play award: Sweden

The women's football tournament at the 2016 Summer Olympics was held from 3 to 19 August 2016. It was the 6th edition of the women's Olympic football tournament. Together with the men's competition, the 2016 Summer Olympics football tournament was held in six cities in Brazil, including Olympic host city Rio de Janeiro, which hosted the final at the Maracanã Stadium. There were no player age restrictions for teams participating in the women's competition.

In March 2016, it was agreed that the competition would be part of IFAB's trial to allow a fourth substitute to be made during extra time. The United States, gold medalists for the previous three Games, were eliminated by a penalty shoot-out defeat against Sweden in the quarter-finals. This marked the first time that the United States did not progress to the semi-finals of a major international tournament. For the first time since the introduction of the women's tournament in 1996, three matches in the knockout stage were decided by a penalty shoot-out (two quarter-finals and one semi-final).

Germany won their first gold medal by defeating Sweden 2–1 in the final. Canada won bronze after beating hosts Brazil with the same scoreline in the bronze medal game.

== Competition schedule ==
The match schedule of the women's tournament was unveiled on 10 November 2015.

G	Group stage	¼	Quarter-finals	SF	Semi-finals	B	Bronze medal match	F	Gold medal match

Wed 3	Thu 4	Fri 5	Sat 6	Sun 7	Mon 8	Tue 9	Wed 10	Thu 11	Fri 12	Sat 13	Sun 14	Mon 15	Tue 16	Wed 17	Thu 18	Fri 19	
G			G			G			¼				½			B	F

== Qualification ==
In addition to host nation Brazil, 11 women's national teams qualified from six separate continental confederations. FIFA ratified the distribution of spots at the Executive Committee meeting in March 2014.

Means of qualification	Dates^{4}	Venue^{4}	Berths	Qualified
Host country	2 October 2009	Denmark	1	Brazil
2014 Copa América	11–28 September 2014	Ecuador	1	Colombia
2015 FIFA World Cup (for UEFA eligible teams)^{5}	6 June – 5 July 2015	Canada	2	Germany
2015 FIFA World Cup (for UEFA eligible teams)^{5}	6 June – 5 July 2015	Canada	2	France
2015 CAF Olympic Qualifying Tournament	2–18 October 2015	Various (home and away)	2	South Africa
2015 CAF Olympic Qualifying Tournament	2–18 October 2015	Various (home and away)	2	Zimbabwe^{6}
2016 OFC Olympic Qualifying Tournament	23 January 2016	Papua New Guinea	1	New Zealand
2016 CONCACAF Olympic Qualifying Championship	10–21 February 2016	United States	2	United States
2016 CONCACAF Olympic Qualifying Championship	10–21 February 2016	United States	2	Canada
2016 AFC Olympic Qualifying Tournament	29 February – 9 March 2016	Japan	2	Australia
2016 AFC Olympic Qualifying Tournament	29 February – 9 March 2016	Japan	2	China
2016 UEFA Olympic Qualifying Tournament	2–9 March 2016	Netherlands	1	Sweden
Total			12	

- ^4Dates and venues are those of final tournaments (or final round of qualification tournaments), various qualification stages may precede matches at these specific venues.
- ^5England finished in the top three among UEFA teams in the World Cup, however England is not an IOC member and talks for them to compete as Great Britain broke down.
- ^6Nations making their Olympic tournament debut

== Venues ==
The tournament was held in seven venues across six cities:

- Estádio Mineirão, Belo Horizonte
- Estádio Nacional Mané Garrincha, Brasília
- Arena da Amazônia, Manaus
- Estádio Olímpico João Havelange, Rio de Janeiro
- Estádio do Maracanã, Rio de Janeiro
- Itaipava Arena Fonte Nova, Salvador
- Arena Corinthians, São Paulo

== Squads ==
The women's tournament was a full international tournament with no restrictions on age. Each team had to submit a squad of 18 players, two of whom must be goalkeepers. Each team might also have a list of four alternate players, who would replace any player in the squad in case of injury during the tournament.

== Match officials ==
On 2 May 2016, FIFA released the list of match referees that would officiate at the Olympics.

Match officials
Confederation	Referee	Assistant referees
AFC	Rita Gani (Malaysia)	Cui Yongmei (China PR) (Note: Cui Yongmei (China PR) replaced Allyson Flynn (Australia) as assistant referee for the Germany v Canada group stage match.); Naomi Teshirogi (Japan)
AFC	Ri Hyang-ok (North Korea)	Allyson Flynn (Australia); Hong Kum-nyo (North Korea)
CAF	Gladys Lengwe (Zambia)	Bernadettar Kwimbira (Malawi); Souad Oulhaj (Morocco)
CONCACAF	Carol Anne Chenard (Canada)	Marie-Josée Charbonneau (Canada); Suzanne Morisset (Canada)
CONCACAF	Lucila Venegas (Mexico)	Enedina Caudillo (Mexico); Mayte Chávez (Mexico)
CONMEBOL	Olga Miranda (Paraguay)	Mariana de Almeida (Argentina); Yoleida Lara (Venezuela)
CONMEBOL	Claudia Umpiérrez (Uruguay)	Neuza Back (Brazil); Loreto Toloza (Chile)
OFC	Anna-Marie Keighley (New Zealand)	Sarah Jones (New Zealand); Lata Kaumatule (Tonga)
UEFA	Teodora Albon (Romania)	Petruța Iugulescu (Romania); Mária Súkeníková (Slovakia)
UEFA	Stéphanie Frappart (France)	Manuela Nicolosi (France); Yolanda Parga Rodríguez (Spain)
UEFA	Kateryna Monzul (Ukraine)	Nataliya Rachynska (Ukraine); Sanja Rođak-Karšić (Croatia)
UEFA	Esther Staubli (Switzerland)	Chrysoula Kourompylia (Greece); Lucie Ratajová (Czech Republic)

Fourth officials
Confederation	Referee
CONCACAF	Melissa Borjas (Honduras)
CONMEBOL	María Carvajal (Chile)

== Draw ==
The draw for the tournament was held on 14 April 2016, 10:30 BRT (UTC−3), at the Maracanã Stadium, Rio de Janeiro. The 12 teams in the women's tournament were drawn into three groups of four teams. The teams were seeded into four pots based on the FIFA Ranking of March 2016 (in brackets in the table). The hosts Brazil were automatically assigned into position E1. No groups can contain more than one team from the same confederation.

Pot 1	Pot 2	Pot 3	Pot 4
Brazil (8) (assigned to E1); United States (1); Germany (2)	France (3); Australia (5); Sweden (6)	Canada (10); China (12); New Zealand (16)	Colombia (24); South Africa (54); Zimbabwe (95)

== Group stage ==
The top two teams of each group and the two best third-placed teams advanced to the quarter-finals. The rankings of teams in each group were determined as follows:

1. points obtained in all group matches;
2. goal difference in all group matches;
3. number of goals scored in all group matches;

If two or more teams were equal on the basis of the above three criteria, their rankings were determined as follows:

4. points obtained in the group matches between the teams concerned;
5. goal difference in the group matches between the teams concerned;
6. number of goals scored in the group matches between the teams concerned;
7. drawing of lots by the FIFA Organising Committee.

The groups were denoted as groups E, F and G to avoid confusion with the groups of the men's tournament which used designations A–D.

=== Group E ===
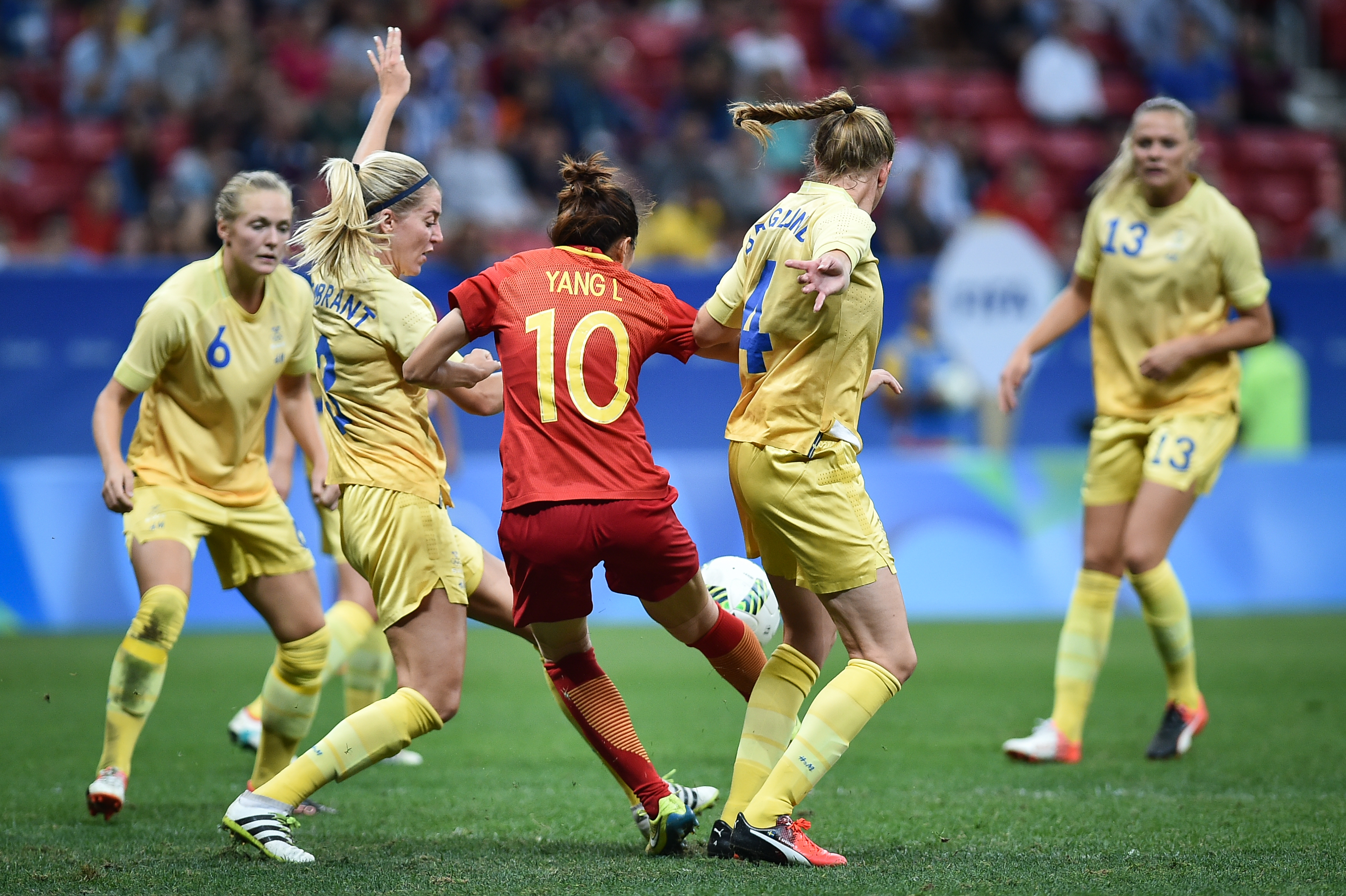
China vs Sweden

Pos	Team	Pld	W	D	L	GF	GA	GD	Pts	Qualification
1	Brazil (H)	3	2	1	0	8	1	+7	7	Quarter-finals
2	China	3	1	1	1	2	3	−1	4	Quarter-finals
3	Sweden	3	1	1	1	2	5	−3	4	Quarter-finals
4	South Africa	3	0	1	2	0	3	−3	1	

Source: Rio2016 & FIFA
Rules for classification: Tiebreakers
(H) Hosts
3 August 2016
13:00

Sweden	1–0	South Africa
Fischer 76'	Report (Rio2016); Report (FIFA); Report

Estádio Olímpico João Havelange, Rio de Janeiro
Attendance: 13,439
Referee: Teodora Albon (Romania)
3 August 2016
16:00

Brazil	3–0	China
Mônica 36'; Andressa 59'; Cristiane 90'	Report (Rio2016); Report (FIFA)

Estádio Olímpico João Havelange, Rio de Janeiro
Attendance: 27,618
Referee: Carol Chenard (Canada)

6 August 2016
19:00

South Africa	0–2	China
	Report (Rio2016); Report (FIFA)	Gu Yasha 45+1'; Tan Ruyin 87'

Estádio Olímpico João Havelange, Rio de Janeiro
Attendance: 25,000
Referee: Esther Staubli (Switzerland)
6 August 2016
22:00

Brazil	5–1	Sweden
Beatriz 21', 86'; Cristiane 24'; Marta 44' (pen.), 80'	Report (Rio2016); Report (FIFA); Report	Schelin 89'

Estádio Olímpico João Havelange, Rio de Janeiro
Attendance: 43,384
Referee: Lucila Venegas (Mexico)

9 August 2016
22:00 (21:00 UTC–4)

South Africa	0–0	Brazil
	Report (Rio2016); Report (FIFA)

Arena da Amazônia, Manaus
Attendance: 38,415
Referee: Stéphanie Frappart (France)
9 August 2016
22:00

China	0–0	Sweden
	Report (Rio2016); Report (FIFA); Report

Estádio Nacional Mané Garrincha, Brasília
Attendance: 7,648
Referee: Olga Miranda (Paraguay)

=== Group F ===
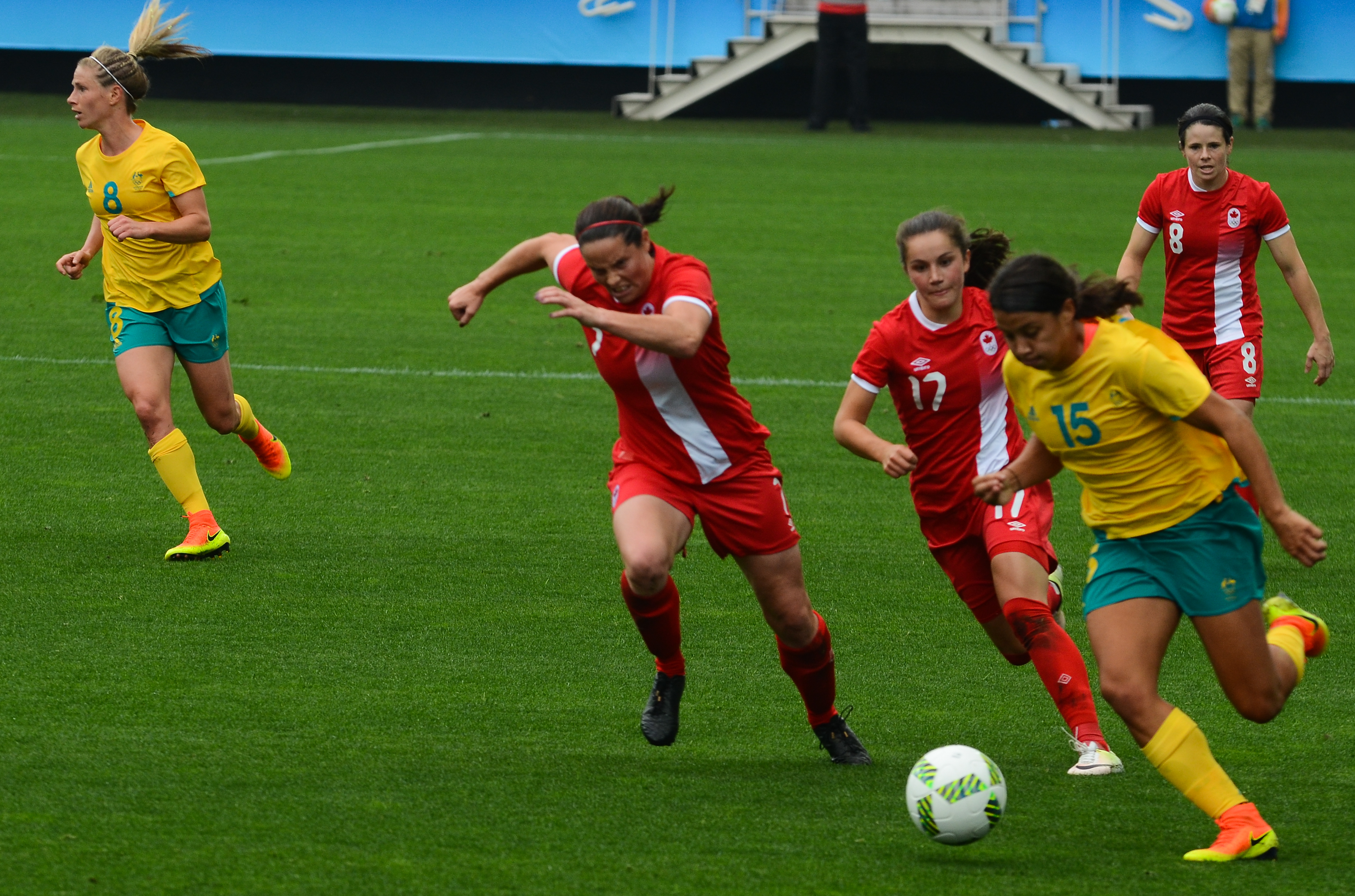
Canada vs Australia

Pos	Team	Pld	W	D	L	GF	GA	GD	Pts	Qualification
1	Canada	3	3	0	0	7	2	+5	9	Quarter-finals
2	Germany	3	1	1	1	9	5	+4	4	Quarter-finals
3	Australia	3	1	1	1	8	5	+3	4	Quarter-finals
4	Zimbabwe	3	0	0	3	3	15	−12	0	

Source: Rio2016 & FIFA
Rules for classification: Tiebreakers
3 August 2016
15:00

Canada	2–0	Australia
Beckie 1'; Sinclair 80'	Report (Rio2016); Report (FIFA)

Arena Corinthians, São Paulo
Attendance: 20,521
Referee: Stéphanie Frappart (France)
3 August 2016
18:00

Zimbabwe	1–6	Germany
Basopo 50'	Report (Rio2016); Report (FIFA)	Däbritz 22'; Popp 36'; Behringer 53', 78'; Leupolz 83'; Chibanda 90' (o.g.)

Arena Corinthians, São Paulo
Attendance: 20,521
Referee: Rita Gani (Malaysia)

6 August 2016
15:00

Canada	3–1	Zimbabwe
Beckie 7', 35'; Sinclair 19' (pen.)	Report (Rio2016); Report (FIFA)	Chirandu 86'

Arena Corinthians, São Paulo
Attendance: 30,295
Referee: Olga Miranda (Paraguay)
6 August 2016
18:00

Germany	2–2	Australia
Däbritz 45+2'; Bartusiak 88'	Report (Rio2016); Report (FIFA)	Kerr 6'; Foord 45'

Arena Corinthians, São Paulo
Attendance: 37,475
Referee: Anna-Marie Keighley (New Zealand)

9 August 2016
16:00

Australia	6–1	Zimbabwe
De Vanna 2'; Polkinghorne 15'; Kennedy 37'; Simon 50'; Heyman 55', 66'	Report (Rio2016); Report (FIFA)	Msipa 90+1'

Itaipava Arena Fonte Nova, Salvador
Attendance: 5,115
Referee: Esther Staubli (Switzerland)
9 August 2016
16:00

Germany	1–2	Canada
Behringer 13' (pen.)	Report (Rio2016); Report (FIFA)	Tancredi 26', 60'

Estádio Nacional Mané Garrincha, Brasília
Attendance: 8,227
Referee: Ri Hyang-ok (North Korea)

=== Group G ===
Pos	Team	Pld	W	D	L	GF	GA	GD	Pts	Qualification
1	United States	3	2	1	0	5	2	+3	7	Quarter-finals
2	France	3	2	0	1	7	1	+6	6	Quarter-finals
3	New Zealand	3	1	0	2	1	5	−4	3	
4	Colombia	3	0	1	2	2	7	−5	1	

Source: Rio2016 & FIFA
Rules for classification: Tiebreakers
3 August 2016
19:00

United States	2–0	New Zealand
Lloyd 9'; Morgan 46'	Report (Rio2016); Report (FIFA)

Mineirão, Belo Horizonte
Attendance: 10,059
Referee: Kateryna Monzul (Ukraine)
3 August 2016
22:00

France	4–0	Colombia
C. Arias 2' (o.g.); Le Sommer 14'; Abily 42'; Majri 82'	Report (Rio2016); Report (FIFA)

Mineirão, Belo Horizonte
Attendance: 6,847
Referee: Ri Hyang-ok (North Korea)

6 August 2016
17:00

United States	1–0	France
Lloyd 64'	Report (Rio2016); Report (FIFA)

Mineirão, Belo Horizonte
Attendance: 11,782
Referee: Claudia Umpierrez (Uruguay)
6 August 2016
20:00

Colombia	0–1	New Zealand
	Report (Rio2016); Report (FIFA)	Hearn 31'

Mineirão, Belo Horizonte
Attendance: 8,505
Referee: Gladys Lengwe (Zambia)

9 August 2016
19:00 (18:00 UTC–4)

Colombia	2–2	United States
Usme 26', 90'	Report (Rio2016); Report (FIFA)	Dunn 41'; Pugh 59'

Arena da Amazônia, Manaus
Attendance: 30,557
Referee: Teodora Albon (Romania)
9 August 2016
19:00

New Zealand	0–3	France
	Report (Rio2016); Report (FIFA)	Le Sommer 38'; Cadamuro 63', 90+2' (pen.)

Itaipava Arena Fonte Nova, Salvador
Attendance: 7,350
Referee: Lucila Venegas (Mexico)

=== Ranking of third-placed teams ===
Pos	Grp	Team	Pld	W	D	L	GF	GA	GD	Pts	Qualification
1	F	Australia	3	1	1	1	8	5	+3	4	Knockout stage
2	E	Sweden	3	1	1	1	2	5	−3	4	Knockout stage
3	G	New Zealand	3	1	0	2	1	5	−4	3	

Source: Rio2016
Rules for classification: 1) Points; 2) Goal difference; 3) Goals scored; 4) Lots drawn by FIFA

== Knockout stage ==
In the knockout stages, if a match is level at the end of normal playing time, extra time is played (two periods of 15 minutes each) and followed, if necessary, by a penalty shoot-out to determine the winner.

On 18 March 2016, the FIFA Executive Committee agreed that the competition would be part of the International Football Association Board's trial to allow a fourth substitute to be made during extra time.

Quarter-finals
12 August — Belo Horizonte
Brazil (p)	0 (7)
Australia	0 (6)
12 August — Brasília
United States	1 (3)
Sweden (p)	1 (4)
12 August — São Paulo
Canada	1
France	0
12 August — Salvador
China	0
Germany	1

Semi-finals
16 August — Rio de Janeiro (Maracanã)
Brazil	0 (3)
Sweden (p)	0 (4)
16 August — Belo Horizonte
Canada	0
Germany	2

Gold medal match
19 August — Rio de Janeiro (Maracanã)
Sweden	1
Germany	2
Bronze medal match
19 August — São Paulo
Brazil	1
Canada	2

=== Quarter-finals ===
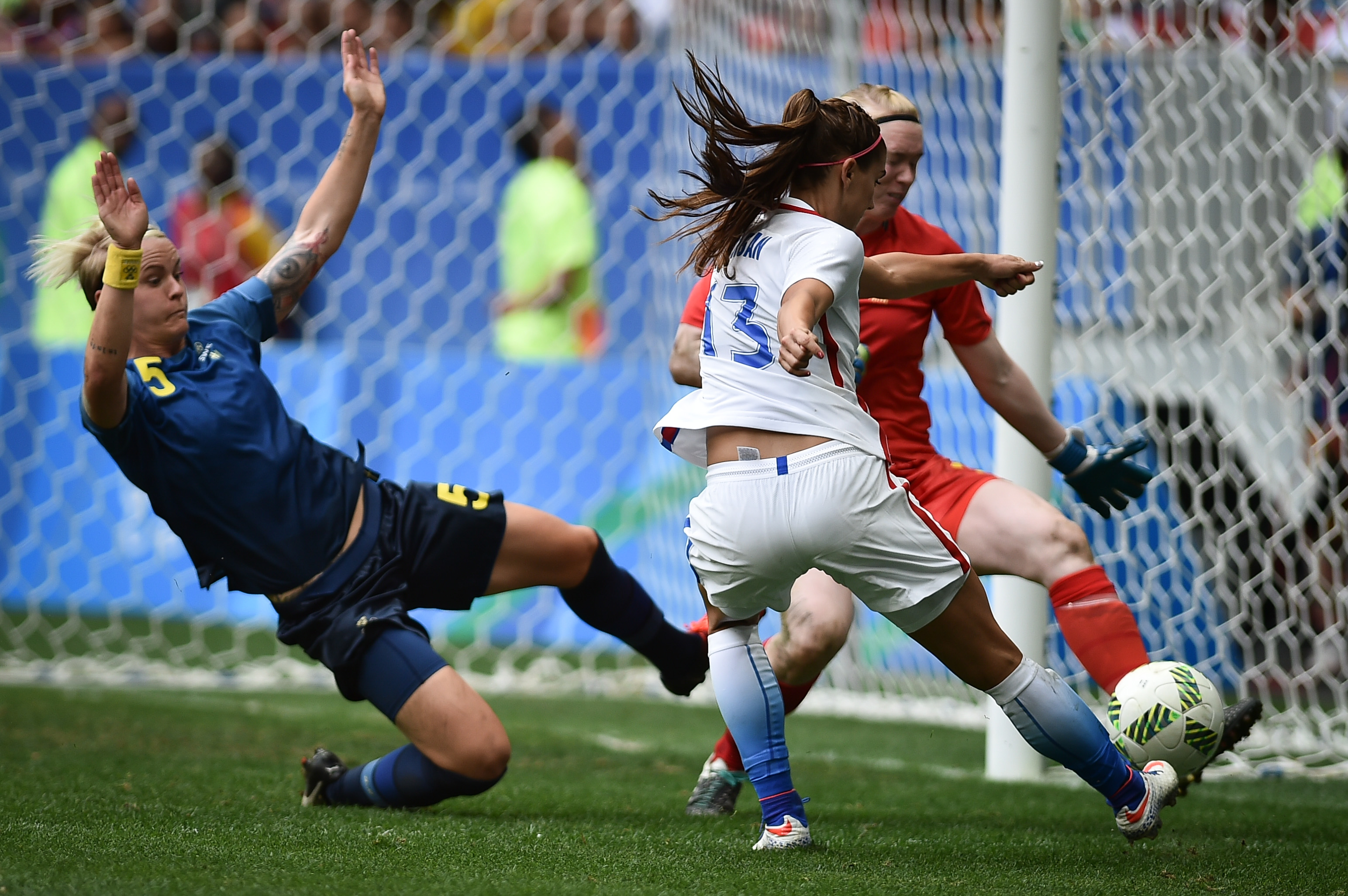
United States vs Sweden

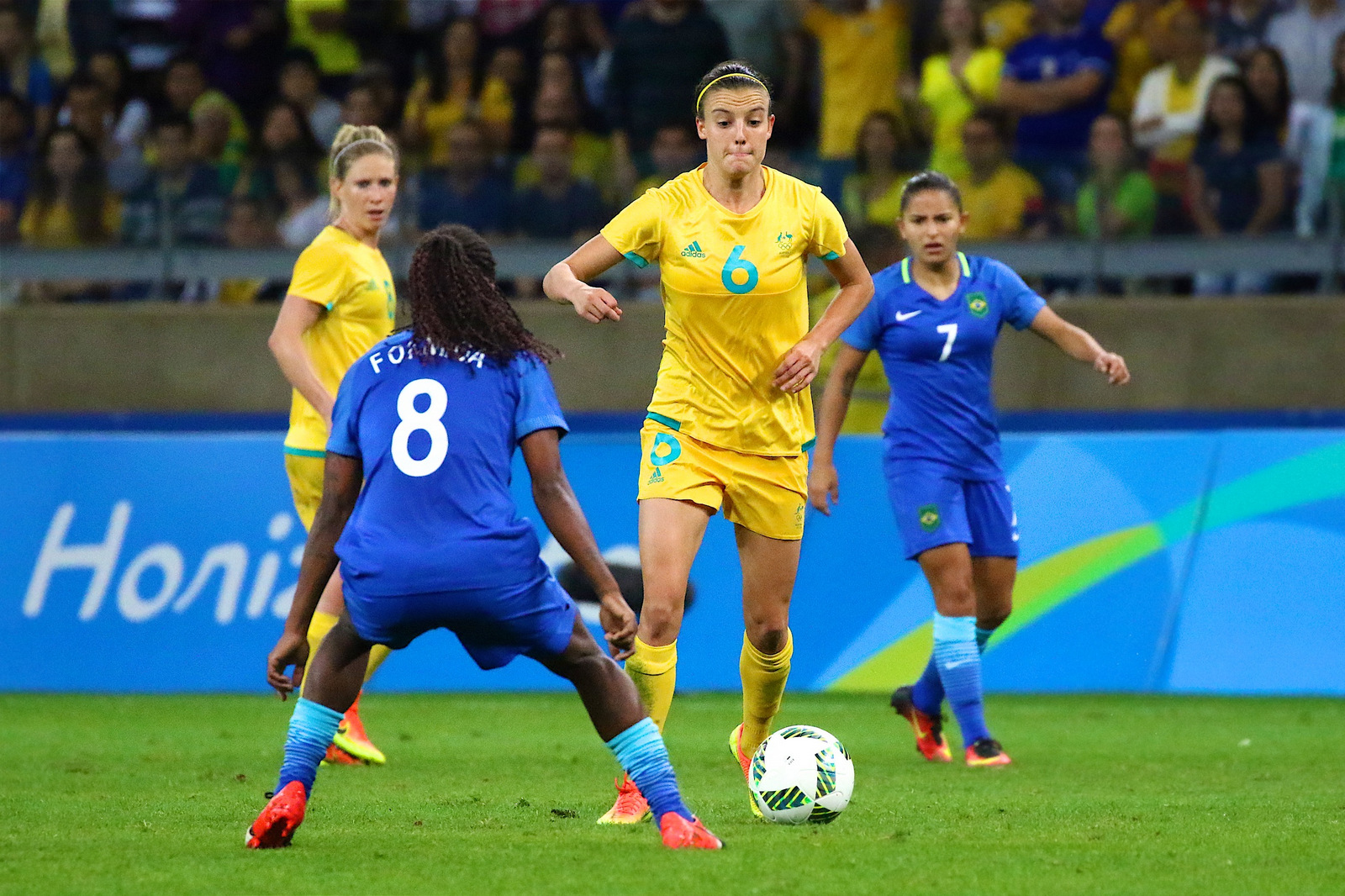
Brazil vs Australia

12 August 2016
13:00

United States	1–1 (a.e.t.)	Sweden
Morgan 77'	Report (Rio2016); Report (FIFA); Report	Blackstenius 61'
Penalties
Morgan (penalty missed); Horan (penalty scored); Lloyd (penalty scored); Brian (penalty scored); Press (penalty missed)	3–4	(penalty scored) Schelin; (penalty scored) Asllani; (penalty missed) Sembrant; (penalty scored) Seger; (penalty scored) Dahlkvist

Estádio Nacional Mané Garrincha, Brasília
Attendance: 13,892
Referee: Anna-Marie Keighley (New Zealand)

12 August 2016
16:00

China	0–1	Germany
	Report (Rio2016); Report (FIFA)	Behringer 76'

Itaipava Arena Fonte Nova, Salvador
Attendance: 9,642
Referee: Kateryna Monzul (Ukraine)

12 August 2016
19:00

Canada	1–0	France
Schmidt 56'	Report (Rio2016); Report (FIFA)

Arena Corinthians, São Paulo
Attendance: 38,688
Referee: Claudia Umpierrez (Uruguay)

12 August 2016
22:00

Brazil	0–0 (a.e.t.)	Australia
	Report (Rio2016); Report (FIFA)
Penalties
Andressa Alves (penalty scored); Andressinha (penalty scored); Beatriz (penalty scored); Rafaelle (penalty scored); Marta (penalty missed); Debinha (penalty scored); Mônica (penalty scored); Tamires (penalty scored)	7–6	(penalty scored) Kellond-Knight; (penalty scored) Alleway; (penalty scored) Van Egmond; (penalty scored) Polkinghorne; (penalty missed) Gorry; (penalty scored) Heyman; (penalty scored) Logarzo; (penalty missed) Kennedy

Mineirão, Belo Horizonte
Attendance: 52,660
Referee: Carol Chenard (Canada)

=== Semi-finals ===
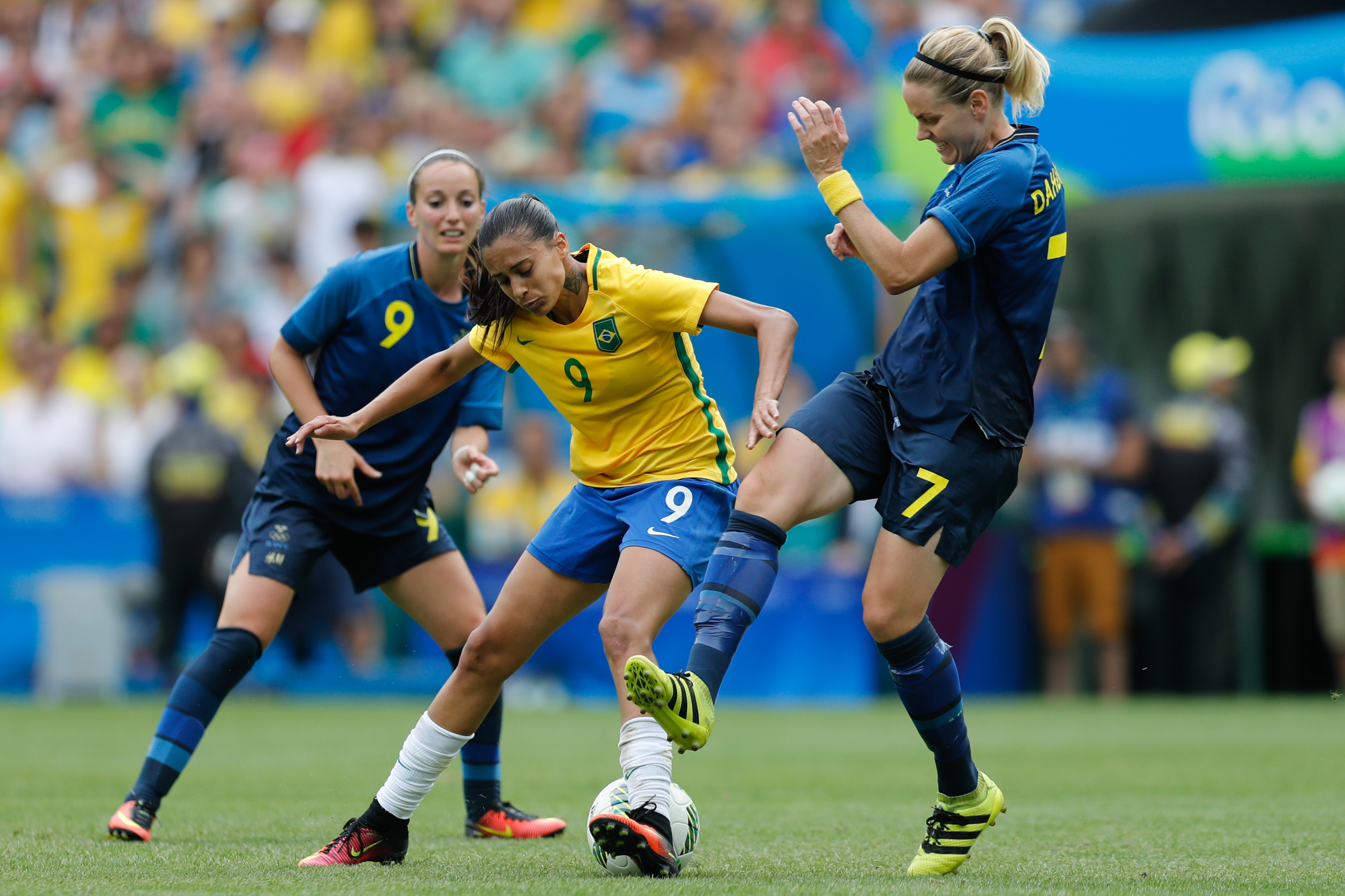
Brazil vs Sweden

16 August 2016
13:00

Brazil	0–0 (a.e.t.)	Sweden
	Report (Rio2016); Report (FIFA); Report
Penalties
Marta (penalty scored); Cristiane (penalty missed); Andressa Alves (penalty scored); Rafaelle (penalty scored); Andressinha (penalty missed)	3–4	(penalty scored) Schelin; (penalty missed) Asllani; (penalty scored) Seger; (penalty scored) Fischer; (penalty scored) Dahlkvist

Maracanã Stadium, Rio de Janeiro
Attendance: 70,454
Referee: Lucila Venegas (Mexico)

16 August 2016
16:00

Canada	0–2	Germany
	Report (Rio2016); Report (FIFA)	Behringer 21' (pen.); Däbritz 59'

Mineirão, Belo Horizonte
Attendance: 5,641
Referee: Ri Hyang-ok (North Korea)

=== Bronze medal match ===
19 August 2016
13:00

Brazil	1–2	Canada
Beatriz 79'	Report (Rio2016); Report (FIFA)	Rose 25'; Sinclair 52'

Arena Corinthians, São Paulo
Attendance: 39,718
Referee: Teodora Albon (Romania)

=== Gold medal match ===
19 August 2016
17:30

Sweden	1–2	Germany
Blackstenius 67'	Report (Rio2016); Report (FIFA); Report	Marozsán 48'; Sembrant 62' (o.g.)

Maracanã Stadium, Rio de Janeiro
Attendance: 52,432
Referee: Carol Chenard (Canada)

== Statistics ==
=== Goalscorers ===
There were 66 goals scored in 26 matches, for an average of 2.54 goals per match.

5 goals

- (Germany) Melanie Behringer

3 goals

- (Brazil) Beatriz
- (Canada) Janine Beckie
- (Canada) Christine Sinclair
- (Germany) Sara Däbritz

2 goals

- (Australia) Michelle Heyman
- (Brazil) Cristiane
- (Brazil) Marta
- (Canada) Melissa Tancredi
- (Colombia) Catalina Usme
- (France) Louisa Cadamuro
- (France) Eugénie Le Sommer
- (Sweden) Stina Blackstenius
- (United States) Carli Lloyd
- (United States) Alex Morgan

1 goal

- (Australia) Lisa De Vanna
- (Australia) Caitlin Foord
- (Australia) Alanna Kennedy
- (Australia) Sam Kerr
- (Australia) Clare Polkinghorne
- (Australia) Kyah Simon
- (Brazil) Andressa Alves
- (Brazil) Mônica
- (Canada) Deanne Rose
- (Canada) Sophie Schmidt
- (China) Gu Yasha
- (China) Tan Ruyin
- (France) Camille Abily
- (France) Amel Majri
- (Germany) Saskia Bartusiak
- (Germany) Melanie Leupolz
- (Germany) Dzsenifer Marozsán
- (Germany) Alexandra Popp
- (New Zealand) Amber Hearn
- (Sweden) Nilla Fischer
- (Sweden) Lotta Schelin
- (United States) Crystal Dunn
- (United States) Mallory Pugh
- (Zimbabwe) Kudakwashe Basopo
- (Zimbabwe) Mavis Chirandu
- (Zimbabwe) Emmaculate Msipa

1 own goal

- (Colombia) Carolina Arias (against France)
- (Sweden) Linda Sembrant (against Germany)
- (Zimbabwe) Eunice Chibanda (against Germany)

Source: FIFA

=== Assists ===
2 assists

- (Australia) Elise Kellond-Knight
- (Australia) Emily van Egmond
- (Brazil) Marta
- (Canada) Christine Sinclair
- (Germany) Melanie Leupolz
- (Germany) Alexandra Popp
- (Zimbabwe) Marjory Nyaumwe

1 assist

- (Australia) Steph Catley
- (Australia) Larissa Crummer
- (Australia) Lisa De Vanna
- (Australia) Caitlin Foord
- (Brazil) Andressa Alves
- (Brazil) Andressinha
- (Brazil) Érika
- (Brazil) Rafaelle
- (Canada) Josée Bélanger
- (Canada) Ashley Lawrence
- (Canada) Deanne Rose
- (Canada) Desiree Scott
- (China) Wang Shuang
- (France) Louisa Cadamuro
- (France) Élodie Thomis
- (Germany) Dzsenifer Marozsán
- (Germany) Anja Mittag
- (New Zealand) Betsy Hassett
- (Sweden) Emilia Appelqvist
- (Sweden) Lisa Dahlkvist
- (Sweden) Olivia Schough
- (United States) Morgan Brian
- (United States) Tobin Heath
- (United States) Carli Lloyd
- (Zimbabwe) Rutendo Makore

Source: FIFA

=== FIFA Fair Play Award ===
Sweden won the FIFA Fair Play Award, given to the team with the best record of fair play during the tournament. Every match in the final competition is taken into account but only teams that reach the second stage of the competition are eligible for the Fair Play Trophy.

Pos	Team	Pts
1	Sweden	872
2	France	859
3	Germany	853
4	Brazil	846
5	United States	840
6	Australia	838
7	China	830
8	Canada	768

=== Tournament ranking ===
Per statistical convention in football, matches decided in extra time are counted as wins and losses, while matches decided by penalty shoot-outs are counted as draws.

Pos	Grp	Team	Pld	W	D	L	GF	GA	GD	Pts	Final result
1	F	Germany	6	4	1	1	14	6	+8	13	Gold medal
2	E	Sweden	6	1	3	2	4	8	−4	6	Silver medal
3	F	Canada	6	5	0	1	10	5	+5	15	Bronze medal
4	E	Brazil (H)	6	2	3	1	9	3	+6	9	Fourth place
5	G	United States	4	2	2	0	6	3	+3	8	Eliminated in quarter-finals
6	G	France	4	2	0	2	7	2	+5	6	Eliminated in quarter-finals
7	F	Australia	4	1	2	1	8	5	+3	5	Eliminated in quarter-finals
8	E	China	4	1	1	2	2	4	−2	4	Eliminated in quarter-finals
9	G	New Zealand	3	1	0	2	1	5	−4	3	Eliminated in group stage
10	E	South Africa	3	0	1	2	0	3	−3	1	Eliminated in group stage
11	G	Colombia	3	0	1	2	2	7	−5	1	Eliminated in group stage
12	F	Zimbabwe	3	0	0	3	3	15	−12	0	Eliminated in group stage

Source: FIFA
(H) Hosts

== See also ==
- Football at the 2016 Summer Olympics – Men's tournament
