= 2010 Algarve Cup =

International women's football tournament

Tournament details
- Host country: Portugal
- Dates: 24 February – 3 March 2010
- Teams: 12 (from 3 confederations)
- Venue(s): 8 (in 8 host cities)

Final positions
- Champions: United States (7th title)
- Runners-up: Germany
- Third place: Sweden
- Fourth place: China

Tournament statistics
- Matches played: 24
- Goals scored: 84 (3.5 per match)
- Top scorer(s): (Germany) Inka Grings (7 goals)

The 2010 Algarve Cup was the seventeenth edition of the Algarve Cup, an invitational women's football tournament held annually in Portugal. It took place between 24 February and 3 March 2010. It was won by the United States who defeated World and European champions Germany 3–2 in the final to extend their record of Algarve titles to seven. Sweden defeated China, 2-0, in the third prize game.

== Format ==
The twelve invited teams were split into three groups that played a round-robin tournament. The main eight entrants were identical to the previous year. Group C featured two different sides with Romania and the Faroe Islands replacing Poland and Wales.

Groups A and B, containing the strongest ranked teams, were the only ones in contention to win the title. The group winners from A and B contested the final, with the runners-up playing for third place and those that finished third in these two groups playing for fifth place.

The teams in Group C were playing for places 7–12, with the winner of Group C playing the team that finished fourth in Group A or B with the better record for seventh place and the Group C runner-up playing the team which came last in Group A or B with the worse record for ninth place. The third and fourth-placed teams in Group C played for eleventh place.

Points awarded in the group stage follow the standard formula of three points for a win, one point for a draw and zero points for a loss. In the case of two teams being tied on the same number of points in a group, their head-to-head result determined the higher place.

== Teams ==
The twelve invited teams were:

Team	FIFA Rankings (December 2009)
United States	1
Germany	2
Sweden	4
Norway	7
Denmark	10
China	13
Finland	16
Iceland	18
Romania	36
Austria	39
Portugal (hosts)	41
Faroe Islands	61

== Group stage ==
All times local (WET/UTC+0)

=== Group A ===
Team	Pts	Pld	W	D	L	GF	GA	GD
Germany	9	3	3	0	0	16	0	+16
China	4	3	1	1	1	3	6	−3
Denmark	3	3	1	0	2	2	7	−5
Finland	1	3	0	1	2	2	10	−8

24 February 2010
15:00

China	1 – 1	Finland
Han Duan 7'		Sällström 54'

Municipal Stadium, Lagos
Referee: Quetzalli Alvarado Godinez (Mexico)

24 February 2010
17:00

Germany	4 – 0	Denmark
Behringer 36'; Prinz 56'; Grings 58', 82'

Complexo Desportivo Belavista, Parchal
Referee: Michelle Pye (Canada)

26 February 2010
15:00

Denmark	0 – 2	China
		Xu Yuan 12', 25'

Municipal Stadium, Lagos
Referee: Silvia Reyes Juarez (Peru)

26 February 2010
17:00

Germany	7 – 0	Finland
Grings 34', 65', 70'; Popp 61', 66'; Keßler 77'; M. Müller 84'

Complexo Desportivo Belavista, Parchal
Referee: Christina Pedersen (Norway)

1 March 2010
17:00

China	0 – 5	Germany
		Garefrekes 2'; Mittag 16', 42'; Peter 75'; Zietz 90'

Estádio Algarve, Faro
Referee: Quetzalli Alvarado Godinez (Mexico)

1 March 2010
17:00

Denmark	2 – 1	Finland
Munk 21'; Nadim 80'		Österberg Kalmari 7' (pen.)

Municipal Stadium, Albufeira
Referee: Marina Wozniak (Germany)

=== Group B ===
Team	Pts	Pld	W	D	L	GF	GA	GD
United States	9	3	3	0	0	6	1	+5
Sweden	4	3	1	1	1	7	5	+2
Norway	4	3	1	1	1	6	6	0
Iceland	0	3	0	0	3	3	10	−7

24 February 2010
15:00

United States	2 – 0	Iceland
Atladóttir 60' (o.g.); Cheney 62'	Report

Municipal Stadium, Vila Real de Santo António
Referee: Christine Bek (Germany)

24 February 2010
18:00

Norway	2 – 2	Sweden
Wiik 7'; Christensen 13'		Sembrant 20'; Landström 53'

Municipal Stadium, Vila Real de Santo António
Referee: Kirsi Heikkienen (Finland)

26 February 2010
15:00

Norway	1 – 2	United States
Herlovsen 64'	Report	Wambach 13', 90+2'

José Arcanjo Stadium, Olhão
Referee: Sung Mi Cha (South Korea)

26 February 2010
15:00

Iceland	1 – 5	Sweden
Magnúsdóttir 17'		Dahlkvist 47', 71' (pen.); Liljegärd 52', 64'; Asllani 69'

Municipal Stadium, Vila Real de Santo António
Referee: Katerina Monzul (Ukraine)

1 March 2010
15:00

United States	2 – 0	Sweden
Cheney 57', 87'	Report

Estádio da Nora, Ferreiras
Referee: Efthalia Mitsi (Greece)

1 March 2010
15:00

Iceland	2 – 3	Norway
Viðarsdóttir 55'; Magnúsdóttir 73'		Gulbrandsen 8', 58'; Woods 62'

Francisco Vieira Stadium, Silves
Referee: Katerina Monzul (Ukraine)

=== Group C ===
Team	Pts	Pld	W	D	L	GF	GA	GD
Romania	7	3	2	1	0	7	1	+6
Portugal	7	3	2	1	0	7	1	+6
Austria	3	3	1	0	2	4	4	0
Faroe Islands	0	3	0	0	3	1	13	−12

Note: Portugal and Romania drew lots to determine finishing positions

24 February 2010
14:00

Portugal	5 – 0	Faroe Islands
Vieira 5', 19'; Fernandes 41', 45', 46'

Complexo Desportivo Belavista, Parchal
Referee: Efthalia Mitsi (Greece)

24 February 2010
18:00

Romania	2 – 0	Austria
Duşă 4'; Rus 35'

Municipal Stadium, Lagos
Referee: Theresa Raissa Neguel (Cameroon)

26 February 2010
14:00

Portugal	0 – 0	Romania

Complexo Desportivo Belavista, Parchal
Referee: Carolina Gonzalez Urrutia (Chile)

26 February 2010
18:00

Austria	3 – 0	Faroe Islands
Burger 7'; Gröbner 28', 59'

Municipal Stadium, Lagos

1 March 2010
14:00

Faroe Islands	1 – 5	Romania
Hansen 11'		Rus 3', 6', 75'; Iuşan 78'; Pavel 90+1'

CD Montechoro, Albufeira
Referee: Faduma Dia (Senegal)

1 March 2010
14:00

Portugal	2 – 1	Austria
Matias 71' (pen.); Couto 81'		Gröbner 13'

Estádio Algarve, Faro
Referee: Jia Wang (China)

== Placement play-offs ==
All times local (WET/UTC+0)

=== 11th Place ===
3 March 2010
11:00

Austria	6 – 0	Faroe Islands
Hanschitz 59', 90+1'; Gröbner 68'; Burger 73'; Puntigam 75', 89'

José Arcanjo Stadium, Olhão
Referee: Silvia Reyes Juarez (Peru)

=== 9th Place ===
3 March 2010
13:00

Portugal	0 – 3	Iceland
		Magnúsdóttir 49'; Viðarsdóttir 62'; Lárusdóttir 90+3'

Estádio Algarve, Faro
Referee: Christina Pedersen (Norway)

=== 7th Place ===
3 March 2010
11:00

Finland	0 – 1	Romania
		Pavel 17'

Francisco Vieira Stadium, Silves
Referee: Theresa Raissa Neguel (Cameroon)

=== 5th Place ===
3 March 2010
11:00

Denmark	2 – 1	Norway
Rasmussen 48'; Veje 60'		Pedersen 90+4'

Estádio da Nora, Ferreiras
Referee: Sung Mi Cha (South Korea)

=== 3rd Place ===
3 March 2010
11:00

China	0 – 2	Sweden
		Dahlkvist 13'; Fischer 68'

Municipal Stadium, Albufeira
Referee: Michelle Pye (Canada)

== Final ==
3 March 2010
16:00

Germany	2 – 3	United States
Grings 41', 74'	Report	Lloyd 18'; Wambach 22'; Cheney 69'

Estádio Algarve, Faro
Attendance: 1,200
Referee: Kirsi Heikkinen (Finland)

GERMANY:
GK	1	Nadine Angerer
DF	4	Babett Peter
DF	22	Bianca Schmidt
DF	15	Sonja Fuss
MF	9	Birgit Prinz (c)
MF	29	Lena Goeßling	(substituted off) 29'
MF	18	Kerstin Garefrekes
MF	7	Melanie Behringer	(substituted off) 86'
MF	19	Fatmire Bajramaj	(substituted off) 46'
FW	8	Inka Grings
FW	11	Anja Mittag	(substituted off) 70'
Substitutes:
GK	12	Ursula Holl
DF	3	Saskia Bartusiak
DF	5	Annike Krahn
FW	13	Célia Okoyino da Mbabi	(substituted in) 46'
MF	14	Kim Kulig
FW	16	Martina Müller	(substituted in) 86'
MF	20	Jennifer Zietz	(substituted in) 29'
MF	27	Alexandra Popp	(substituted in) 70'
Manager:
(Germany) Silvia Neid

UNITED STATES:
GK	1	Hope Solo
DF	17	Meghan Schnur
DF	2	Heather Mitts	(yellow card) 39'
DF	6	Amy LePeilbet
DF	26	Rachel Buehler
MF	7	Shannon Boxx (c)
MF	9	Heather O'Reilly
MF	10	Carli Lloyd	(yellow card) 46'
FW	8	Amy Rodriguez		(substituted off) 59'
FW	11	Lauren Cheney		(substituted off) 83'
FW	20	Abby Wambach
Substitutes:
GK	18	Nicole Barnhart
GK	24	Jillian Loyden
DF	4	Cat Whitehill
MF	5	Lori Lindsey		(substituted in) 59'
MF	12	Yael Averbuch
FW	13	Megan Rapinoe
DF	14	Stephanie Cox
MF	15	Casey Nogueira		(substituted in) 83'
Manager:
(Sweden) Pia Sundhage

MATCH RULES

- 90 minutes
- No extra time
- Penalty shoot-out if scores still level

2010 Algarve Cup

United States
Seventh title
