= Linda Sembrant =

Swedish footballer (born 1987)

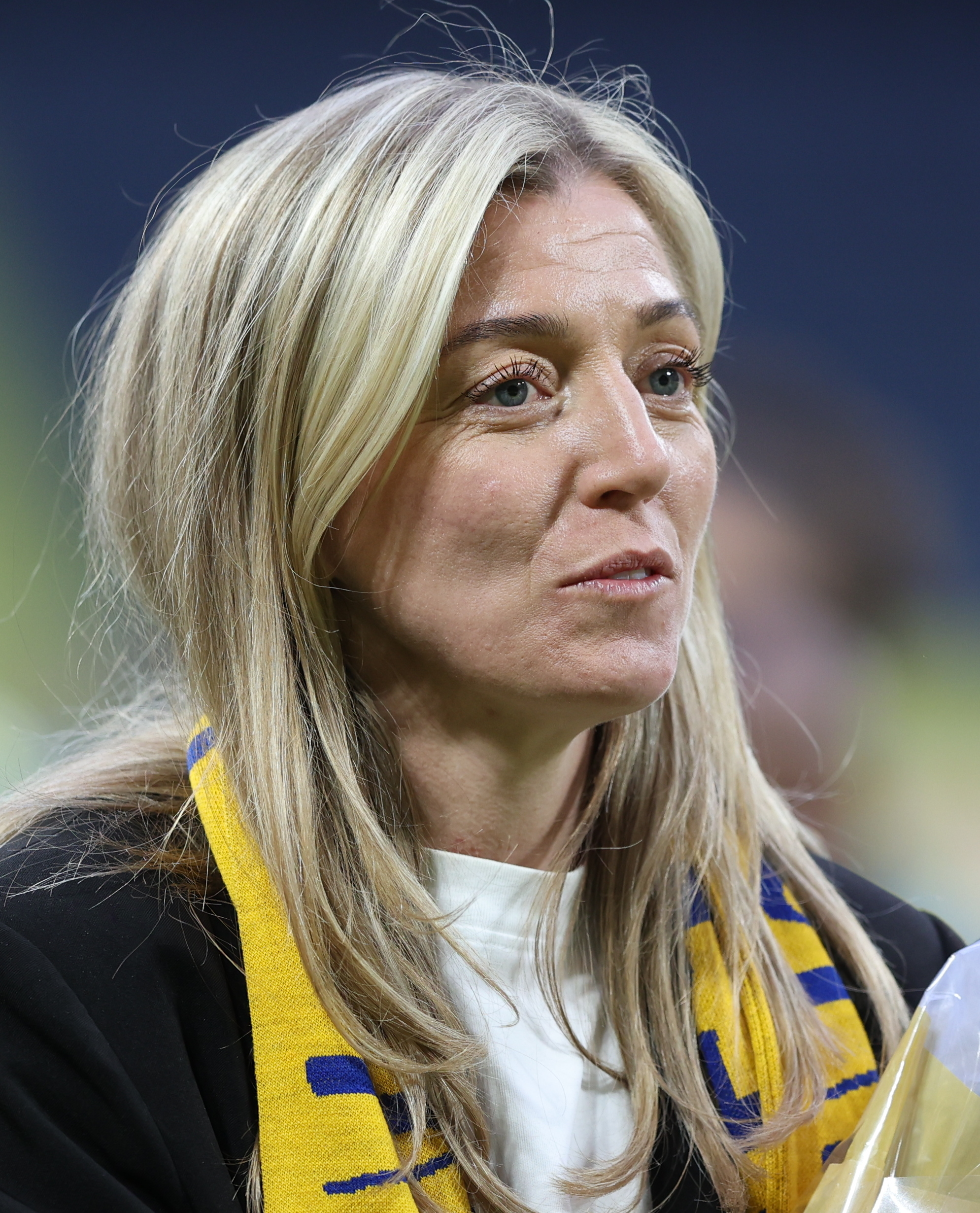
- Sembrant in 2026

Personal information
- Full name: Linda Brigitta Sembrant
- Date of birth: 15 May 1987 (age 39)
- Place of birth: Uppsala, Sweden
- Height: 1.75 m (5 ft 9 in)
- Position: Centre back

Youth career
- SK Servia
- Upsala IF
- Bälingetrollen

Senior career*
Years	Team	Apps	(Gls)
2004–2007	Bälinge IF		
2006	→ Lincoln Ladies (loan)	3	(0)
2008–2010	AIK	62	(6)
2011	Kopparbergs/Göteborg FC	22	(3)
2012–2014	Tyresö FF	30	(4)
2014–2019	Montpellier	99	(9)
2019–2024	Juventus	67	(7)
2024	→ Bayern Munich (loan)	10	(1)
2024–2025	Bayern Munich	11	(2)
2025–2026	AIK	9	(1)

International career^{‡}
2008–2025	Sweden	155	(19)
Medal record
Women's soccer
Representing Sweden
Olympic Games
Silver medal – second place	2016 Rio de Janeiro	Team
FIFA Women's World Cup
Bronze medal – third place	2011 Germany	Team
Bronze medal – third place	2019 France	Team
Bronze medal – third place	2023 Australia	Team
- * Club domestic league appearances and goals as of 12 June 2026 ‡ National team caps and goals as of 21 February 2025

Linda Brigitta Sembrant (born 15 May 1987) is a Swedish former professional footballer who last played as a centre back for Damallsvenskan club AIK Stockholm.

== Club career ==
Sembrant began playing football with SK Servia, then progressed through the youth system of Bälinge IF. Although her role model while growing up was the striker Henrik Larsson, Sembrant became a defender.

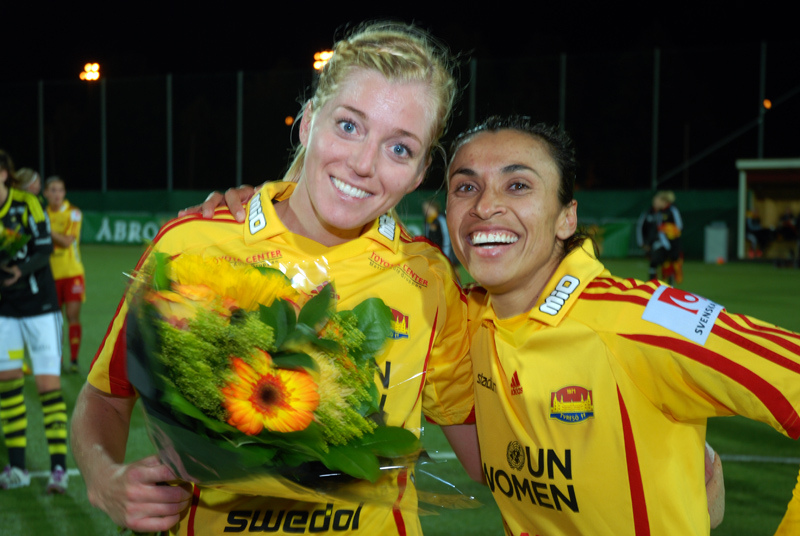
Sembrant (L) and Marta

Sembrant spent the 2006–07 off–season playing in England with Lincoln Ladies (then known as Lincoln City Ladies). She then moved to AIK in 2008. In November 2010 Sembrant switched to Kopparbergs/Göteborg FC, after becoming captain of AIK. One year later she moved to Tyresö FF.

In 2012 Sembrant was part of the Tyresö team who won the Damallsvenskan championship, but she missed the end of the season after suffering an anterior cruciate ligament injury. Tyresö suffered a financial collapse during the 2014 season, withdrawing from the league and letting all their players go. Sembrant secured a lucrative move to French club Montpellier.

In July 2019, Sembrant moved to Italy to sign with defending Serie A champions Juventus.

In January 2024, Sembrant was loaned to Bayern Munich until the end of the 2023–24 season. After winning the Bundesliga in her first season at Bayern, Sembrant signed a new contract for 2024–2025 season. Sembrant scored three goals in 31 games for Munich and won two Bundesliga titles, one DFB-Cup and one DFB-Supercup.

In August 2025, Sembrant signed a contract with AIK Stockholm until 31 December 2026.

== International career ==
Sembrant represented Sweden at all youth levels, then won her first senior cap against England in February 2008. She was withdrawn from the Sweden squad for Euro 2009 through injury.

In 2011 Sembrant was called up to Sweden's squad for the World Cup in Germany. She retained her place in the national selection for the 2012 London Olympics.

On the occasion of Sembrant's 50th cap, she scored Sweden's goal in a 1–1 draw with Canada. The friendly match was staged in Los Angeles in November 2014.

Sembrandt scored against Thailand at the 2019 FIFA Women's World Cup, the opening goal in a 5–1 win.

On 13 June 2023, she was included in the 23-player squad for the 2023 FIFA Women's World Cup.

On 24 November 2025, it was announced that Sembrant retired from the national team.

== Personal life ==
Sembrant used to date Italian footballer Lisa Boattin.

== Career statistics ==
=== Club ===
As of 12 May 2025

Club	Season	League			Cup (Note: Includes Svenska cupen (women), Coupe de France féminine, Coppa Italia (women), Supercoppa Italiana (women), DFB-Pokal Frauen)		Continental (Note: Includes UEFA Women's Champions League)		Total	
Club	Season	Division	Apps	Goals	Apps	Goals	Apps	Goals	Apps	Goals
Bälinge IF	2005	Norrettan	3	3	0	0	—		3	3
AIK	2008	Damallsvenskan	21	2	0	0	—		21	2
AIK	2009	Damallsvenskan	20	2	2	2	—		22	4
AIK	2010	Damallsvenskan	21	2	2	1	—		23	3
Kopparbergs/Göteborg FC	2011	Damallsvenskan	22	3	5	0	4	2	31	5
Tyresö FF	2012	Damallsvenskan	13	1	1	0	—		14	1
Tyresö FF	2013	Damallsvenskan	11	2	0	0	4	0	15	2
Tyresö FF	2014	Damallsvenskan	6	1	2	0	5	0	13	1
Montpellier HSC	2014–15	D1 Féminine	22	2	4	0	—		26	2
Montpellier HSC	2015–16	D1 Féminine	22	4	5	1	—		27	5
Montpellier HSC	2016–17	D1 Féminine	18	1	2	0	—		20	1
Montpellier HSC	2017–18	D1 Féminine	20	2	4	0	6	1	30	3
Montpellier HSC	2018–19	D1 Féminine	18	0	1	0	—		19	0
Juventus FC	2019–20	Serie A	16	2	3	1	2	0	21	3
Juventus FC	2020–21	Serie A	19	3	3	0	2	0	24	3
Juventus FC	2021–22	Serie A	9	0	4	0	2	0	15	0
Juventus FC	2022–23	Serie A	21	2	6	0	8	0	35	2
Juventus FC	2023–24	Serie A	2	0	1	0	2	0	5	0
Bayern Munich	2023–24	Frauen-Bundesliga	10	1	3	0	0	0	13	1
Bayern Munich	2024–25	Frauen-Bundesliga	11	2	1	0	6	0	18	2
AIK	2025	Damallsvenskan	0	0	0	0	—		0	0
Career total			305	35	49	5	41	3	395	43

=== International goals ===
No.	Date	Venue	Opponent	Score	Result	Competition	Ref.
1.	24 February 2010	Municipal Stadium, Vila Real de Santo António, Portugal	Norway	1–2	2–2	2010 Algarve Cup	
2.	10 March 2014	Estádio Algarve, Faro, Portugal	Japan	1–0	1–2	2014 Algarve Cup	
3.	21 August 2014	Stadion Kazimierza Deyny, Starogard Gdański, Poland	Poland	4–0	4–0	2015 FIFA Women's World Cup qualification	
4.	26 November 2014	Los Angeles, United States	Canada	1–0	1–1	Friendly	
5.	8 June 2015	Investors Group Field, Winnipeg, Canada	Nigeria	3–2	3–3	2015 FIFA Women's World Cup	
6.	20 June 2015	TD Place Stadium, Ottawa, Canada	Germany	1–3	1–4	2015 FIFA Women's World Cup	
7.	8 April 2016	NTC Poprad, Poprad, Slovakia	Slovakia	2–0	3–0	UEFA Women's Euro 2017 qualifying	
8.	8 July 2017	Falcon Alkoholfri Arena, Falkenberg, Sweden	Mexico	1–0	1–0	Friendly	
9.	16 June 2019	Allianz Riviera, Nice, France	Thailand	1–0	5–1	2019 FIFA Women's World Cup	
10.	3 September 2019	Daugava Stadium, Liepāja, Latvia	Latvia	1–1	4–1	UEFA Women's Euro 2022 qualifying	
11.	8 October 2019	Gamla Ullevi, Gothenburg, Sweden	Slovakia	3–0	7–0	UEFA Women's Euro 2022 qualifying	
12.	17 September 2020	Gamla Ullevi, Gothenburg, Sweden	Hungary	8–0	8–0	UEFA Women's Euro 2022 qualifying	
13.	1 December 2020	Anton Malatinský Stadium, Trnava, Slovakia	Slovakia	2–0	6–0	UEFA Women's Euro 2022 qualifying	
14.	19 February 2021	Hibernians Stadium, Paola, Malta	Austria	1–0	6–1	Friendly	
15.	7 April 2022	Tengiz Burjanadze Stadium, Gori, Georgia	Georgia	4–0	15–0	2023 FIFA Women's World Cup qualification	
16.	22 July 2022	Leigh Sports Village, Leigh, England	Belgium	1–0	1–0	UEFA Women's Euro 2022	
17.	6 September 2022	Tampere Stadium, Tampere, Finland	Finland	3–0	5–0	2023 FIFA Women's World Cup qualification	
18.	31 October 2023	Eleda Stadion, Malmö, Sweden	Italy	1–1	1–1	2023–24 UEFA Women's Nations League A	
19.	19 February 2024	Odense Stadium, Odense, Denmark	Denmark	1–0	2–1	2025 UEFA Women's Nations League A	

== Honours ==
Kopparbergs/Göteborg FC

- Svenska Cupen: 2011

Tyresö FF

- Damallsvenskan: 2012

Juventus

- Serie A: 2019–20, 2020–21, 2021–22
- Coppa Italia: 2022, 2023
- Supercoppa Italiana: 2019, 2020–21

Bayern Munich

- Frauen-Bundesliga: 2023–24, 2024–25
- DFB-Supercup: 2024
- DFB-Pokal: 2024–25

Sweden

- Summer Olympic Games Silver Medal: 2016
- FIFA Women's World Cup third place: 2011, 2019, 2023
- Algarve Cup: 2009, 2018
