= Hilal Tuba Tosun Ayer =

Turkish football referee

- Born: January 1, 1970 (age 56); Ankara, Turkey
- Other occupation: Teacher

Domestic
Years	League	Role
1997–1998	A2 Ligi	assistant referee
1998–2014	TFF Third League	referee
2001–2013	A2 Ligi	referee
2002–2014	TFF Second League	referee
2012–2014	Women's Second League	referee
2008–2013	Women's First League	referee

International
Years	League	Role
2000–2014	FIFA Women's World Cup; UEFA Women's Championship	referee

Hilal Tuba Tosun Ayer (born Hilal Tuba Tosun in 1970) is a Turkish retired female association football referee and teacher of physical education by profession. She is a FIFA listed woman referee since 2000.

== Early life ==
Hilal Tuba Tosun was born 1970 in Ankara, Turkey to a sportspeople family. Her father Nizamettin Tosun is a former police chief and national sport shooter. Her brother is professional basketball player. She studied physical education at Dokuz Eylül University in İzmir, and became a school teacher.

== Sport career ==
She became interested in football sport through two teacher colleagues of hers. She was encouraged also by her father to attend a referee course. She started her referee career serving as an assistant referee in a TFF Third League match on May 11, 1996. She was promoted to the referee position officiating a match in the same league on November 1, 1998. In later years, she oversaw many football competitions in different higher-level leagues. Since November 23, 2008, she supervises matches in the Turkish Women's First Football League.

In 2000, Tosun Ayer received her FIFA badget to officiate international football matches. On July 16, 2006, she oversaw the group stage match between the women's national teams of Sweden and Denmark in Langenthal, Switzerland. Tosun Ayer officiated the preliminary round match of Norway against France at the 2008 UEFA Women's Under-19 Championship played in Romorantin-Lanthenay, France on July 13, 2008. She supervised the match between the national teams from Wales and the Czech Republic at the 2011 FIFA Women's World Cup qualification – UEFA Group 8 in Llanelli, Wales on 23 September 2009. Another Women's World Cup qualification match she officiated was the game between Hungary and Bosnia and Herzegovina in Sopron, Croatia on March 31, 2010. She served as referee at the UEFA Women's Euro 2013 qualifying round matches for the Group 1 game Greece against Macedonia in Athens, Greece on April 4, 2012 and for the Group 3 game Hungary Bulgaria in Sopron, Croatia on September 19, 2012. She officiated the 2015 FIFA Women's World Cup qualification – UEFA Group 7 match between France and Kazakhstan in Angers, France on April 5, 2014.

After officiating a TFF Second League match as the fourth official on May 11, 2014, she ended her 18-year referee career, during which she served in a total of 208 matches.

== Family life ==
She continued her teaching career at the Police Academy in Ankara, where she met her future husband Salih Ayer, who was a footballer in the academy's team. The couple has a child.
