= 2009 Damallsvenskan =

Women's Football season

Damallsvenskan
- Season: 2009
- Champions: Linköpings
- Top goalscorer: Linnea Liljegärd (22 goals)

The 2009 Damallsvenskan was the 22nd season of the Damallsvenskan, the highest level of professional women's football in Sweden, with 12 teams competing. The season ran from 25 March to 7 November. For the first time in five years the league had a new champion in Linköpings, as Umeå IK did not manage to win the league for a fifth time in a row. Newly promoted Piteå and Stattena were both relegated. Göteborg's Linnea Liljegärd finished as the season's top scorer with 22 goals.

== Table ==
Pos	Team	Pld	W	D	L	GF	GA	GD	Pts	Qualification or relegation
1	Linköpings FC (C, Q)	22	15	4	3	45	11	+34	49	Qualification to Champions League Round of 32
2	Umeå IK (Q)	22	15	3	4	53	22	+31	48	Qualification to Champions League Qualifying Round
3	LdB FC Malmö	22	14	3	5	60	16	+44	45	
4	Kopparbergs/Göteborg FC	22	14	3	5	46	21	+25	45	
5	KIF Örebro	22	13	3	6	34	25	+9	42	
6	Djurgårdens IF	22	13	2	7	53	29	+24	41	
7	Sunnanå SK	22	10	2	10	28	27	+1	32	
8	AIK	22	7	3	12	29	38	−9	24	
9	Hammarby IF	22	6	3	13	29	38	−9	21	
10	Kristianstads DFF	22	6	0	16	32	61	−29	18	
11	Piteå IF (R)	22	2	3	17	16	59	−43	9	Relegation to First Division
12	Stattena IF (R)	22	1	3	18	14	92	−78	6	Relegation to First Division

Rules for classification: 1) Points; 2) Goal difference; 3) Number of goals scored
(C) Champions; (Q) Qualified for the phase indicated; (R) Relegated
