= Jessica Landström =

Swedish footballer

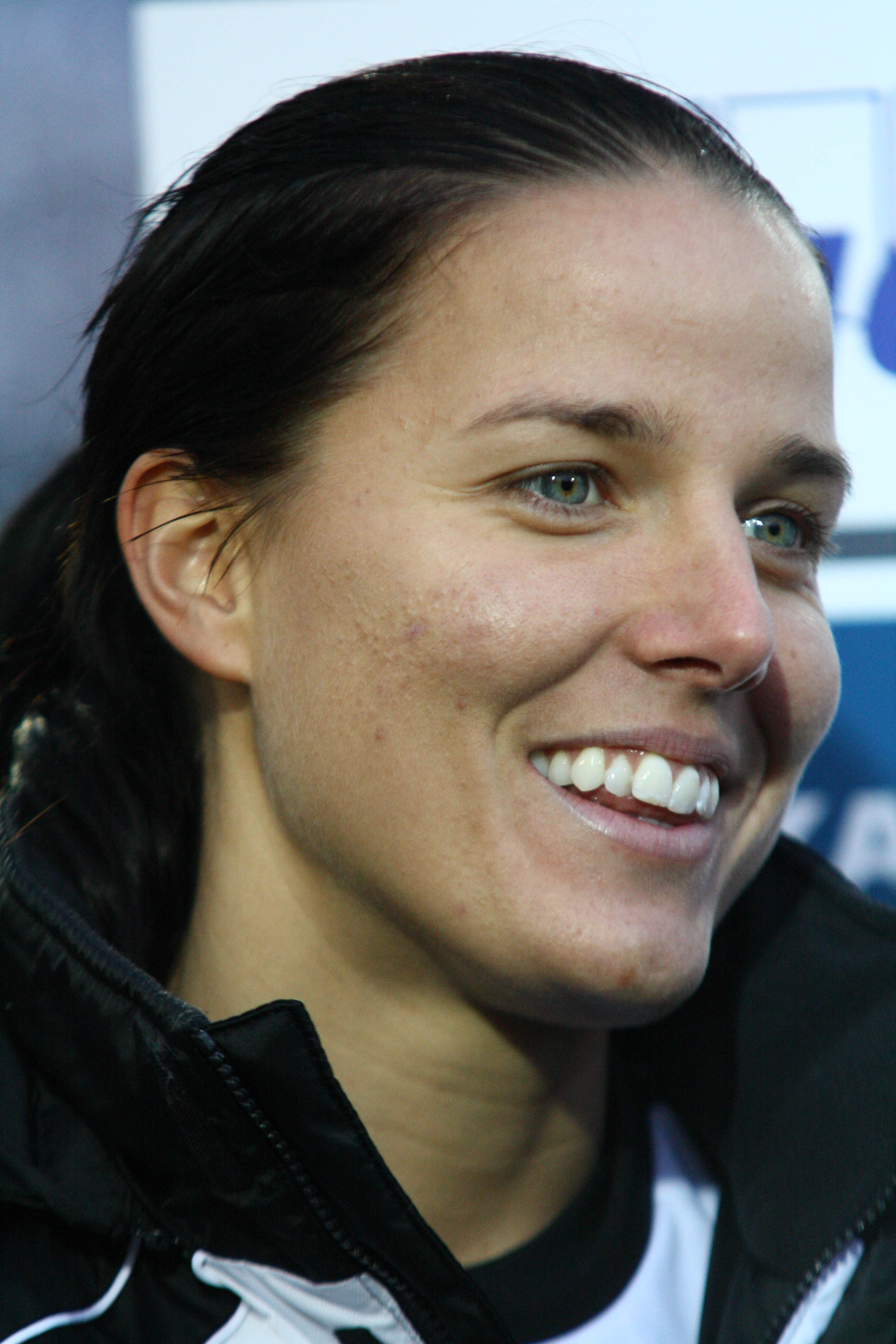
- Landström with Frankfurt in 2011

Personal information
- Full name: Jessica Elin Maria Landström
- Date of birth: 12 December 1984 (age 41)
- Place of birth: Nacka, Sweden
- Height: 1.80 m (5 ft 11 in)
- Positions: Midfielder; forward

Youth career
- 1995–1997: Lira Luleå BK
- 1998–1999: Vallentuna BK
- 2000: Täby FF

Senior career*
Years	Team	Apps	(Gls)
2001–2004	Djurgårdens IF (Note: 2003–2004 as Djurgården/Älvsjö.)		
2005–2007	Hammarby IF		
2007–2009	Linköpings FC	39	(23)
2010	Sky Blue FC	9	(0)
2010–2012	1. FFC Frankfurt	29	(9)
2012	Djurgårdens IF	15	(6)
2013	Kopparbergs/Göteborg FC	19	(0)

International career
2005–2007	Sweden U-23	9	(3)
2007–2012	Sweden	64	(19)
Medal record
Women's football
Representing Sweden
FIFA Women's World Cup
Bronze medal – third place	2011 Germany	Team
- * Club domestic league appearances and goals

Jessica Elin Maria Landström (born 12 December 1984) is a former Swedish football forward who has represented the Sweden women's national football team at the 2008 Olympic Football Tournament, the 2009 UEFA Women's Championship and the 2011 FIFA Women's World Cup. At club level she has played for Damallsvenskan teams Djurgårdens IF, Hammarby IF, Linköpings FC and Kopparbergs/Göteborg FC. She has also played for 1. FFC Frankfurt of Germany and Sky Blue FC of the United States.

== Club career ==
After starting her career with four years at Djurgårdens, Landström played for Hammarby IF as a forward from 2005 to 2007. A few weeks after her debut and first goal for the Sweden women's national team, she was signed by Linköpings FC to replace the departing Frida Östberg. The transfer multiplied her salary by nearly six times; when with Hammarby, she made about $500 a month, whereas she reportedly banked up to $3,000 playing for Linköpings. She intended that the transfer would help to secure her spot on the national squad for the 2008 Beijing Olympics.

Landström scored 11 goals in 17 games in 2008 and decided to stay with Linköpings for the 2009 season, in which the club collected a league and cup "double". She scored against Umeå in the 2–0 Swedish Cup final win.

In November 2009 Landström signed a professional contract with American WPS team Sky Blue FC. After starting three of nine appearances for Sky Blue, Landström negotiated a release and accepted a two-year contract from FFC Frankfurt in July 2010. She criticised the American club for a lack of leadership and expressed the hope that playing in Germany would provide better preparation for the 2011 FIFA Women's World Cup.

Landström agreed a deal to return to Djurgårdens in April 2012, but with Frankfurt still in the UEFA Women's Champions League, the German club insisted on her staying until the end of their season before she was eventually allowed to complete the move.

When Djurgårdens were relegated at the end of the 2012 season, Landström transferred to Kopparbergs/Göteborg FC. She was signed as a direct replacement for Christen Press, Göteborg's top goalscorer who had departed for Tyresö FF. After leaving Göteborg, Landström did not play in 2014 but was training with former club Hammarby ahead of the 2015 campaign.

== International career ==
Landström's "dreams were crushed" when she was overlooked for the youth national teams, after finishing as top–scorer in a regional Under–15 tournament. She debuted for the senior Sweden national team against Denmark on 8 November 2007, starting at forward and scoring her first international goal in a 4–2 win. She had also played for the U21/23 national team.

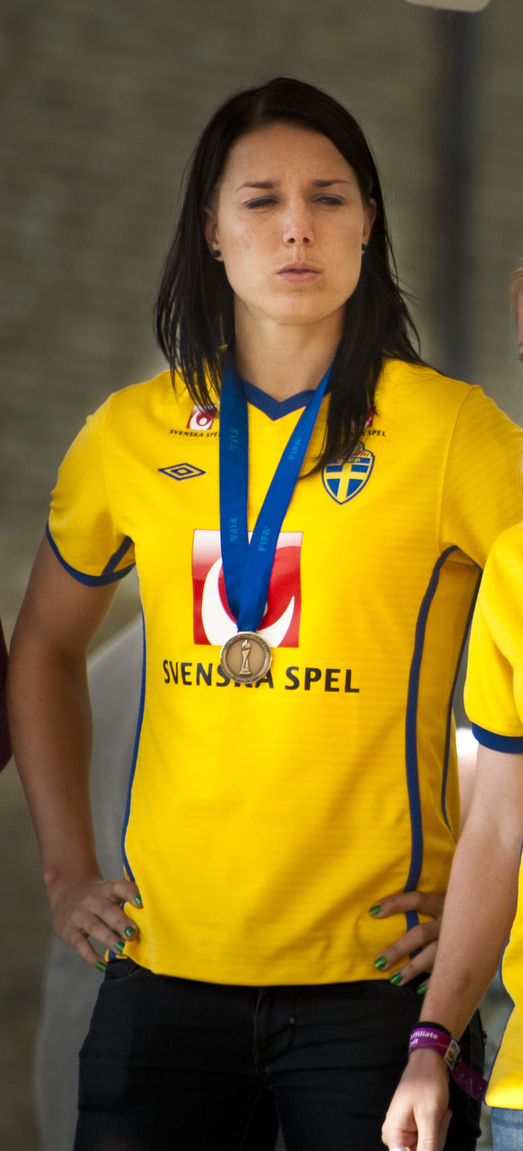
Landström with her World Cup bronze medal

She was included in coach Thomas Dennerby's squad for the 2008 Olympic Games. It was her first major championship and she wanted to learn from playing alongside first choice strikers Lotta Schelin and Victoria Sandell Svensson. Landström played in four games in China, and retained her place in the national squad for UEFA Women's Euro 2009, where she played twice.

At the 2011 FIFA Women's World Cup Landström scored the winning goal in the group stage win over Colombia, as Sweden reached the semi-final. She featured as a substitute in Sweden's 3–1 defeat to eventual winners Japan in Frankfurt. Sweden secured third place by beating France 2–1 in Sinsheim, though Landström remained an unused substitute.

Landström was named as an alternate for the Sweden squad at the 2012 London Olympics but did not play.

== Playing style ==
In signing Landström for Sky Blue FC, the American club's general manager Gerry Marrone said:

Jessica is the prototypical target: she can play with her back to the goal, is commanding in the air and a big physical presence. This season in Sweden, she was one of the leading goal scorers, and more importantly, scored some big goals in big games.

== International goals ==
No.	Date	Venue	Opponent	Score	Result	Competition
1.	8 November 2007	Viborg, Denmark	Denmark	1–0	4–2	2008 Summer Olympics qualification
2.	23 September 2009	Gothenburg, Sweden	Belgium	2–1	2–1	2011 FIFA Women's World Cup qualification
3.	24 October 2009	Baku, Azerbaijan	Azerbaijan	2–0	3–0	2011 FIFA Women's World Cup qualification
4.	28 October 2009	Heverlee, Belgium	Belgium	3–0	4–1	2011 FIFA Women's World Cup qualification
5.	24 February 2010	Vila Real de Santo António, Portugal	Norway	1–2	2–2	2010 Algarve Cup
6.	31 March 2010	Broughton, Wales	Wales	4–0	4–0	2011 FIFA Women's World Cup qualification
7.	23 June 2010	Gothenburg, Sweden	Azerbaijan	9–0	17–0	2011 FIFA Women's World Cup qualification
8.	23 June 2010	Gothenburg, Sweden	Azerbaijan	14–0	17–0	2011 FIFA Women's World Cup qualification
9.	4 March 2011	Olhão, Portugal	Denmark	1–0	3–1	2011 Algarve Cup
10.	4 March 2011	Olhão, Portugal	Denmark	3–1	3–1	2011 Algarve Cup
17.	28 June 2011	Leverkusen, Germany	Colombia	1–0	1–0	2011 FIFA Women's World Cup
18.	2 March 2012	Ferreiras, Portugal	Iceland	3–1	4–1	2012 Algarve Cup

== Personal life ==
Landström is lesbian and came out publicly in November 2008, to acknowledge the support she had received from her partner. Before turning professional, she had studied for a master's degree in mechanical engineering.

== Honours ==
=== Club ===
Djurgårdens IF

- Damallsvenskan (2): 2003, 2004
- Svenska Cupen (1): 2004

Linköpings FC

- Damallsvenskan (1): 2009
- Svenska Cupen (2): 2008, 2009
- Supercupen (1): 2009

1. FFC Frankfurt

- German Cup (1): 2010–11

Kopparbergs/Göteborg FC

- Supercupen (1): 2013

=== Individual ===
- Swedish Newcomer of the Year (1): 2008
