= Linnea Liljegärd =

Swedish footballer

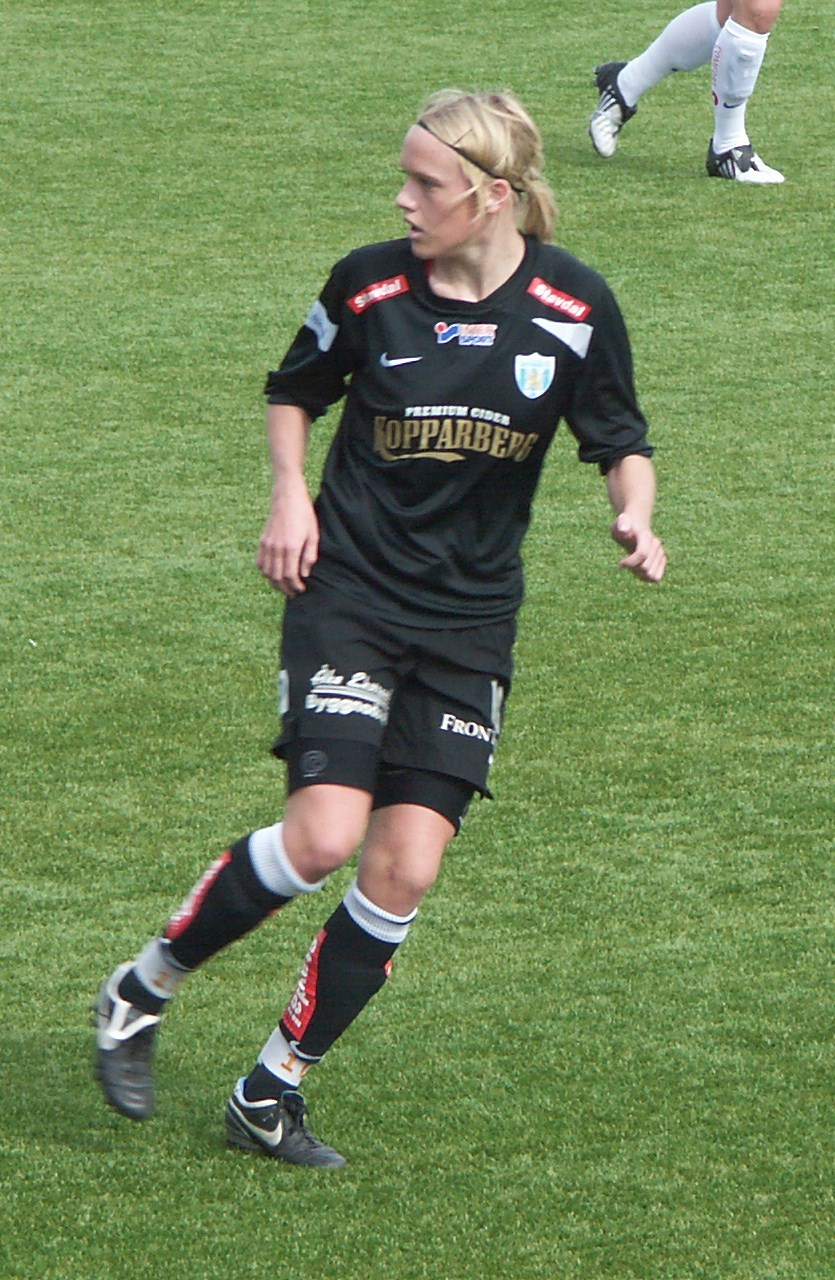

Personal information
- Full name: Linnea Viktoria Liljegärd
- Date of birth: 8 December 1988 (age 37)
- Place of birth: Arvika, Sweden
- Height: 1.68 m (5 ft 6 in)
- Positions: Midfielder; forward

Youth career
- Skogsbygdens IF

Senior career*
Years	Team	Apps	(Gls)
2004–2007	Falköpings KIK		
2008–2012	Kopparbergs/Göteborg FC	101	(65)
2012–2013	WFC Rossiyanka	2	(0)
2013	Avaldsnes IL	10	(3)
2013–2014	Kristianstads DFF	25	(5)

International career^{‡}
2009–2011	Sweden	18	(6)
- * Club domestic league appearances and goals as of 21:29, 27 November 2014 (UTC) ‡ National team caps and goals as of 21:29, 27 November 2014 (UTC)

Linnea Viktoria Liljegärd (born 8 December 1988) is a Swedish former footballer who played for the Sweden women's national football team as well as professional clubs in Sweden, Norway and Russia.

== Club career ==
Liljegärd was raised in Vårgårda and began her career with Skogsbygdens IF. After three years with Falköpings KIK, she joined Kopparbergs/Göteborg FC in 2008. In 2009 Liljegärd was the top scorer in the Damallsvenskan with 22 goals. She turned down approaches from WPS club Sky Blue FC and Swedish champions Linköpings FC in order to stay with Göteborg.

In September 2012 Göteborg accepted an offer for Liljegärd from WFC Rossiyanka and she transferred to the Russian club. In January 2013 she opted out of her contract and returned to Sweden for surgery on a foot injury. After recovering she signed for Norwegian Toppserien club Avaldsnes IL.

She returned to Sweden with Damallsvenskan club Kristianstads DFF in August 2013. Liljegärd announced her retirement from playing in November 2014, aged 25, to focus on coaching Division 2 team Bergdalens IK. She had lost her motivation but did not rule out a comeback.

== International career ==
Liljegärd represented Sweden at all youth levels, then won her first senior cap in a 5–1 friendly win over Norway in January 2009. She was subsequently named in the Sweden squad for Euro 2009.

Despite good form at domestic level, in June 2011 Liljegärd was left out of Sweden's squad for the World Cup in Germany.

== International goals ==
No.	Date	Venue	Opponent	Score	Result	Competition
1.	26 February 2010	Vila Real de Santo António, Portugal	Iceland	2–1	5–1	2010 Algarve Cup
2.	26 February 2010	Vila Real de Santo António, Portugal	Iceland	3–1	5–1	2010 Algarve Cup
3.	31 March 2010	Broughton, Wales	Wales	2–0	4–0	2011 FIFA Women's World Cup qualification
4.	23 June 2010	Gothenburg, Sweden	Azerbaijan	6–0	17–0	2011 FIFA Women's World Cup qualification
5.	23 June 2010	Gothenburg, Sweden	Azerbaijan	8–0	17–0	2011 FIFA Women's World Cup qualification
6.	23 June 2010	Gothenburg, Sweden	Azerbaijan	12–0	17–0	2011 FIFA Women's World Cup qualification
