= Kosovare Asllani =

Swedish footballer (born 1989)

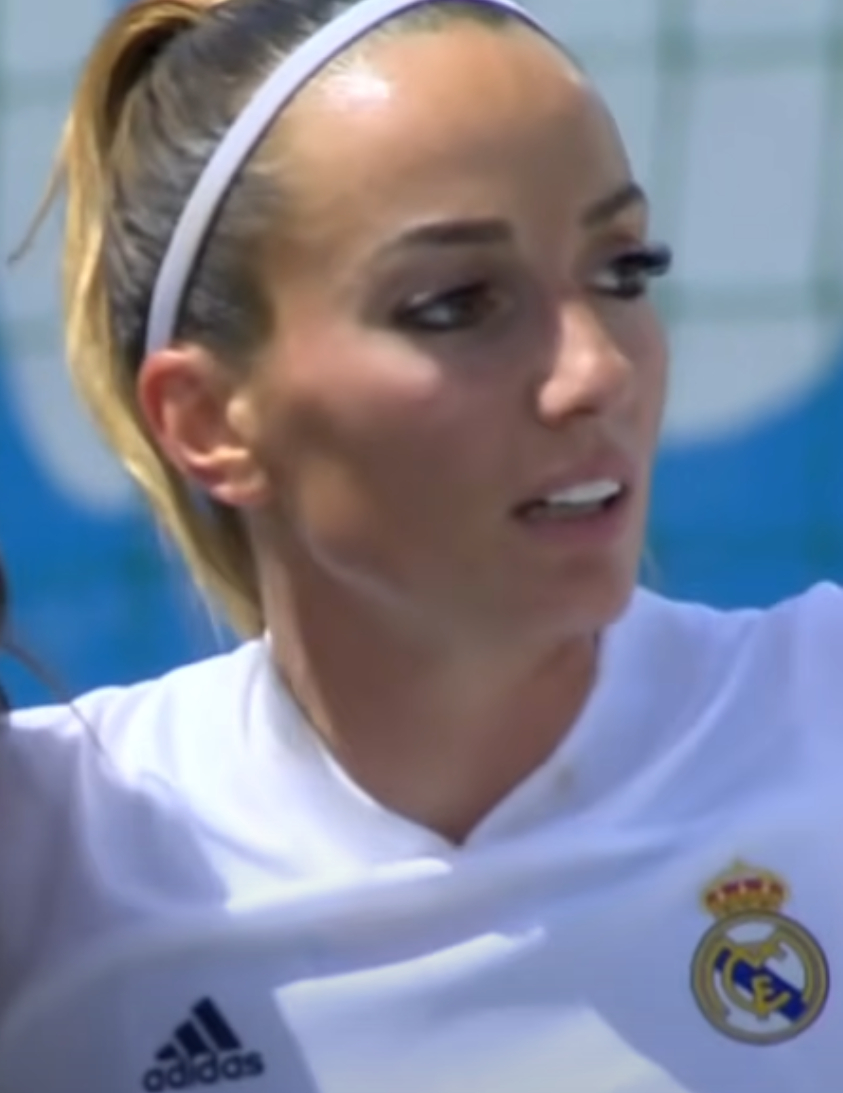
- Asllani with Real Madrid in 2021

Personal information
- Full name: Kosovare Asllani
- Date of birth: 29 July 1989 (age 37)
- Place of birth: Kristianstad, Sweden
- Height: 1.66 m (5 ft 5 in)
- Positions: Striker; attacking midfielder

Team information
- Current team: London City Lionesses
- Number: 9

Youth career
- 2004–2007: Vimmerby IF

Senior career*
Years	Team	Apps	(Gls)
2007–2009	Linköpings FC	37	(21)
2010	Chicago Red Stars	13	(2)
2010–2011	Linköpings FC	26	(7)
2012	Kristianstads DFF	15	(7)
2012–2016	Paris Saint-Germain	59	(39)
2016–2017	Manchester City	15	(2)
2017–2019	Linköpings FC	27	(8)
2019–2022	Real Madrid	63	(24)
2022–2024	AC Milan	34	(15)
2024–	London City Lionesses	35	(7)

International career^{‡}
2005–2006	Sweden U17	6	(1)
2007–2008	Sweden U19	15	(5)
2008–2012	Sweden U23	4	(3)
2008–	Sweden	209	(50)
Medal record
Women's football
Representing Sweden
FIFA Women's World Cup
Bronze medal – third place	2019 France	Team
Bronze medal – third place	2023 Australia/New Zealand	Team
Olympic Games
Silver medal – second place	2016 Rio de Janeiro	Team
Silver medal – second place	2020 Tokyo	Team
- * Club domestic league appearances and goals as of 06:59, 20 May 2026 (UTC) ‡ National team caps and goals as of 09:20, 20 May 2026 (UTC)

Kosovare Asllani (Albanian: [kɔsɔˈvaɾɛ asˈlani]; born 29 July 1989) is a Swedish professional footballer who plays as a striker or attacking midfielder for and captains both Women's Super League club London City Lionesses and the Sweden national team.

Asllani began her club career with Vimmerby IF and has played in the Damallsvenskan for Linköpings FC and hometown club Kristianstads DFF. In the 2010 season she played in the United States, with Chicago Red Stars of Women's Professional Soccer (WPS). She returned to Sweden to play for Kristianstad, before moving to Paris Saint-Germain, Manchester City and then back to Linköping.

== Club career ==
=== Childhood and early career ===
Asllani is of Kosovar Albanian descent, born in Kristianstad to Kosovar parents who had migrated to Sweden. Asllani grew up playing both football and ice hockey, but chose to focus her talents on football. At the age of 15, Asllani started her career at second division team Vimmerby IF. During her time at Vimmerby, she scored 49 goals in 48 matches, establishing herself as a football prodigy. Former coach Cecilia Wilhelmsson praised Asllani's football technique and fitness. After receiving offers from many clubs, Asllani accepted a move to Damallsvenskan team Linköpings FC in 2007, where she made quick progress.

=== Linköpings FC, 2007–2009 ===
During Asllani's first season, she generally came off the substitutes' bench early in the games to help her settle into the Damallsvenskan. During the following season, Asllani established herself as a regular starter and was an increasingly valuable member of the squad. In 2009, she helped Linköping win both the Svenska Cupen and the club's first ever Damallsvenskan title.

=== Chicago Red Stars, 2009–10 ===
On 4 December 2009, American Women's Professional Soccer (WPS) club Chicago Red Stars confirmed that they had signed Asllani from Linköpings FC. Asllani spent a single season in the WPS. She was established as a fan's favourite and in the 7th week of the season, Asllani received the WPS Player of the Week award after Chicago Red Stars' defeat of FC Gold Pride. After her season with the Red Stars, Asllani returned to Sweden and Linköpings FC.

=== Return to Linköping, 2010–11 ===
Asllani's presence boosted Linköping, especially in the UEFA Women's Champions League. She scored goals against Sparta Praha and Arsenal. However, her season was disrupted by a thigh injury and she departed Linköping at the end of the campaign.

=== Kristianstads DFF, 2011–12 ===
In December 2011, she moved back to her hometown Kristianstad to play with Kristianstads DFF who had finished seventh in the previous year's Damallsvenskan.

=== Paris Saint-Germain, 2012–16 ===
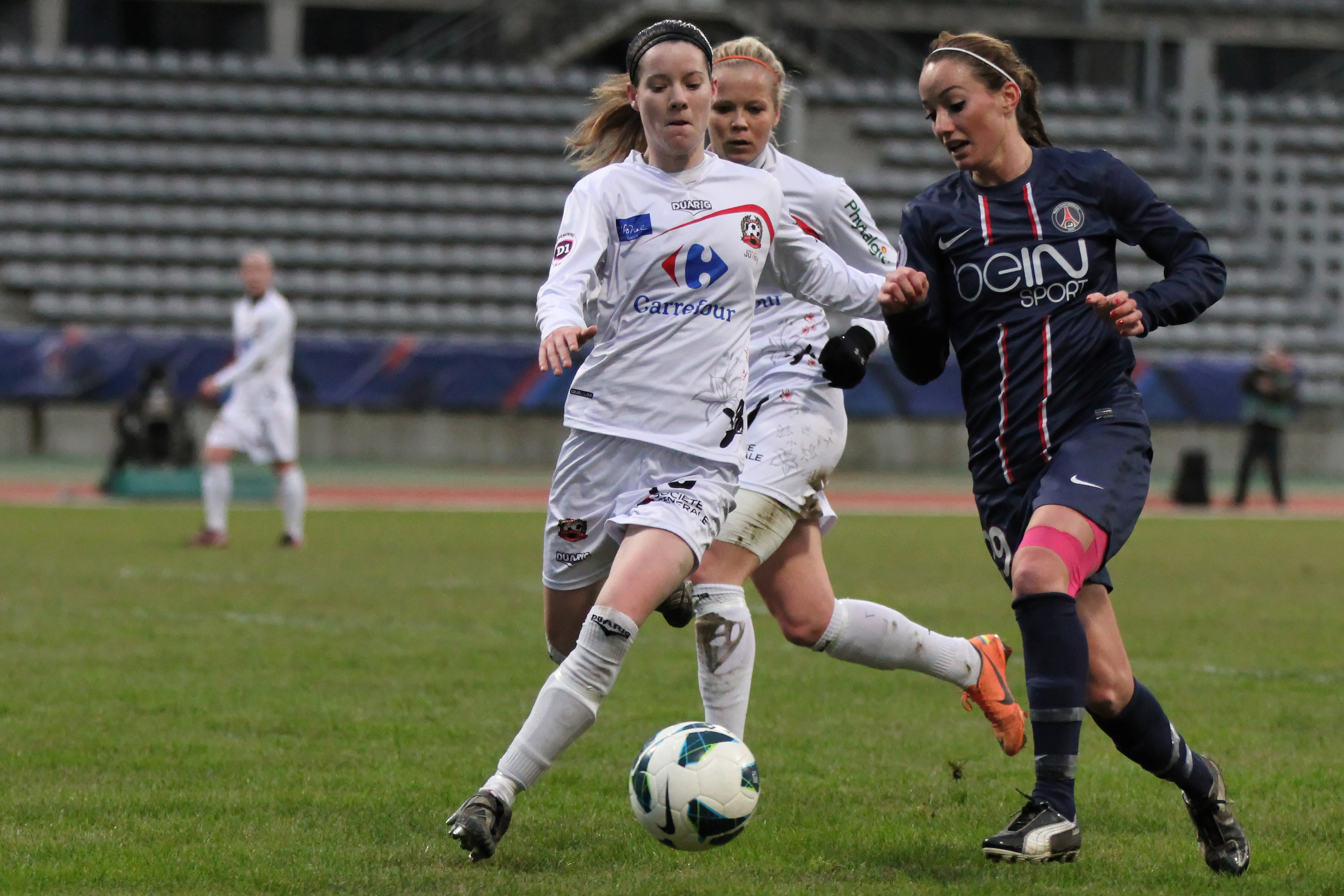
Asllani (right) playing for PSG against FCF Juvisy in December 2012

When Asllani had a month left on her contract with Kristianstad she was subject to a transfer bid from Paris Saint-Germain. Although the teams were in dispute over the size of the transfer fee, Asllani flew to Paris and signed a two-year contract in September 2012, after completing a medical. At PSG, Asllani was presented to the media by sporting director Leonardo and player Zlatan Ibrahimović, who declared: "If you want to win you need a Swedish striker." Asllani scored 17 goals in her 19 appearances in the 2012–13 Division 1 Féminine, as PSG finished second in the table behind Lyon. On 4 January 2016, Asllani announced on her Instagram account that she had ended her contract with Paris Saint-Germain, where she had played for three-and-a-half years.

=== Manchester City, 2016–17 ===
On 22 January 2016, English FA WSL club Manchester City revealed that they had signed Asllani to a two-year contract.

=== Third spell with Linköpings FC, 2017–19 ===
On 10 August 2017, it was announced a two-and-a-half-year contract had been agreed for Asllani to return to Linköpings FC. She departed the club by mutual consent on 15 July 2019.

=== CD Tacón/Real Madrid, 2019–22 ===
After her departure from Linköpings FC, Asllani signed with CD Tacón/Real Madrid on 18 July 2019.

Upon Real Madrid's purchase of their license, CD Tacón would operate as Real Madrid's women's team from 2020, making Asllani the first Galáctica. Asllani scored 5 goals in 17 league appearances for Tacón in the prematurely ended 2019–20 Primera Iberdrola season. After the rebrand of the team to Real Madrid CFF, she scored 8 goals in the first 8 league appearances despite playing in an unfamiliar out-and-out-striker role. In 2021–22, Asllani scored 3 league goals.

=== AC Milan, 2022 ===
On 30 June 2022, Asllani joined Italian club AC Milan. She scored 9 goals in her first season in Serie A.

=== London City Lionesses, 2024–26 ===
Asllani joined the London City Lionesses of the Women's Championship on 28 June 2024.

The club was promoted to the Super League for the 2025–26 season. In their first game against Arsenal on 6 September 2025, Asllani scored London City's first goal in the top flight of football.

In March 2026, Asllani suffered a ‘‘complex’’ multi-ligament which included a rupture of her anterior cruciate ligament. On 14 July 2026, Asllani signed a one-year contract extension with the club.

== International career ==
In September 2008 Asllani made her debut for the Sweden national team against Romania. Next year she was called up to represent Sweden in the UEFA Euro 2009. Asllani was an important member of the national team during the qualification rounds of the 2011 World Cup, but coach Thomas Dennerby controversially did not select her in the squad sent to the finals. Football pundits, including Pia Sundhage, the Swedish coach of the United States national team, expressed surprise at Asllani's omission.

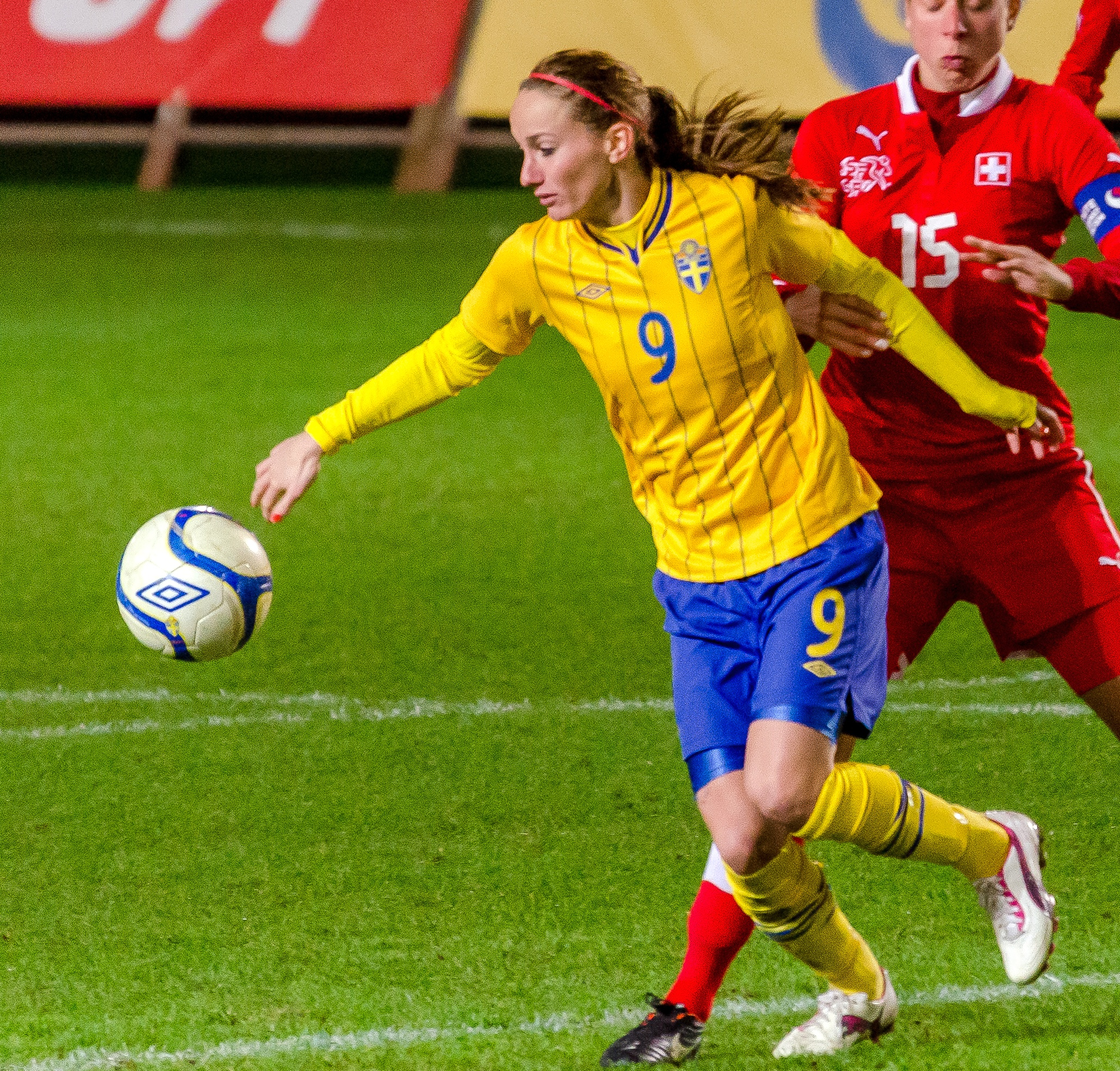
Asllani playing for Sweden in 2012

Dennerby recalled Asllani to the national squad for the 2012 London Olympics.

Asllani played for Sweden at the 2016 Summer Olympics, where the team won a silver medal. She failed to score a single goal during the tournament, despite playing in all six of Sweden's games. She scored in the penalty shootout against the United States in the quarterfinals, in which Sweden won the shootout 4–3 after being tied 1–1 during extra time. She again stepped up to take a penalty against Brazil in the semi final, but her weak effort was saved.

She scored in the 5–1 and 2-0 wins over Thailand and Chile at the 2019 World Cup respectively.

In 2021, Asllani was selected for the Sweden squad at the 2021 Summer Olympics. Like in 2016, her only goal was a penalty, this time in the quarter final vs Japan. She took a crucial penalty in the final against Canada, but missed the target from twelve yards, as Sweden lost the shootout, and once again had to settle for silver medals.

On 13 June 2023, she was included in the 23-player squad for the 2023 World Cup. She made the final goal in Sweden's match against Australia on 19 August 2023. Sweden won and secured the bronze medals for the team.

== Personal life ==
Asllani was born in Sweden to ethnic Albanian parents from Koshutovë, Kosovo. She has a tattoo of a black double-headed eagle, symbolising Albania, on her ankle. She also has the words "Stay Strong" tattooed on the inside of her right biceps.

== Career statistics ==
=== Club ===
As of match played 16 May 2026

Appearances and goals by club, season and competition
Club	Season	League			National cup (Note: Includes Svenska Cupen, Coupe de France, Women's FA Cup, Copa de la Reina)		League cup (Note: Includes Women's League Cup)		Continental		Total	
Club	Season	Division	Apps	Goals	Apps	Goals	Apps	Goals	Apps	Goals	Apps	Goals
Linköpings	2007	Damallsvenskan	1	1	2	2	—		—		3	3
Linköpings	2008	Damallsvenskan	21	9	0	0	—		—		21	9
Linköpings	2009	Damallsvenskan	22	12	3	5	—		3	1	28	18
Linköpings	Total		44	22	5	7	0	0	3	1	52	30
Chicago Red Star	2010	Women's Professional Soccer	13	2	—		—		—		13	2
Linköpings	2010	Damallsvenskan	7	3	0	0	—		4	4	11	7
Linköpings	2011	Damallsvenskan	19	4	4	2	—		—		23	6
Linköpings	Total		26	7	4	2	0	0	4	4	34	13
Kristianstads DFF	2012	Damallsvenskan	15	7	3	2	—		—		18	9
Paris Saint Germain	2012–13	D1 Féminine	19	17	4	5	—		—		23	22
Paris Saint Germain	2013–14	D1 Féminine	17	7	1	0	—		2	0	20	7
Paris Saint Germain	2014–15	D1 Féminine	17	13	3	0	—		9	1	29	14
Paris Saint Germain	2015–16	D1 Féminine	6	2	0	0	—		0	0	6	2
Paris Saint Germain	Total		59	39	8	5	0	0	11	1	78	45
Manchester City	2016	Women's Super League	11	1	3	0	3	0	8	1	25	2
Manchester City	2017	Women's Super League	4	1	1	0	—		3	1	8	2
Manchester City	Total		15	2	4	0	3	0	11	2	33	4
Linköpings	2017	Damallsvenskan	9	0	6	2	—		—		15	2
Linköpings	2018	Damallsvenskan	19	9	3	4	—		4	0	26	13
Linköpings	2019	Damallsvenskan	6	1	0	0	—		—		6	1
Linköpings	Total		34	10	9	16	0	0	4	0	47	16
Real Madrid	2019–20	Primera División	17	5	1	1	—		—		18	6
Real Madrid	2020–21	Primera División	29	16	1	1	—		—		30	17
Real Madrid	2021–22	Primera División	17	3	1	1	—		3	2	21	4
Real Madrid	Total		63	24	3	3	0	0	3	2	69	27
AC Milan	2022–23	Serie A	17	9	1	1	—		—		18	10
AC Milan	2023–24	Serie A	17	6	3	0	—		—		20	6
AC Milan	Total		34	15	4	1	0	0	0	0	38	16
London City Lionnesses	2024–25	Women's Championship	16	5	2	1	1	0	—		19	6
London City Lionnesses	2025–26	Women's Super League	19	2	2	0	0	0	—		21	2
London City Lionnesses	Total		35	7	4	1	1	0	0	0	40	8
Career total			338	128	44	27	4	0	36	10	422	165

=== International ===
As of match played 7 March 2026

Appearances and goals by national team and year
National team	Year	Apps	Goals
Sweden	2008	2	0
Sweden	2009	14	2
Sweden	2010	12	2
Sweden	2011	3	1
Sweden	2012	11	3
Sweden	2013	15	5
Sweden	2014	11	5
Sweden	2015	12	4
Sweden	2016	12	3
Sweden	2017	17	5
Sweden	2018	12	1
Sweden	2019	17	6
Sweden	2020	6	0
Sweden	2021	12	2
Sweden	2022	13	5
Sweden	2023	13	2
Sweden	2024	10	1
Sweden	2025	15	3
Sweden	2026	2	0
Total		209	50

Scores and results list Sweden's goal tally first, score column indicates score after each Asllani goal.

List of international goals scored by Kosovare Asllani
No.	Date	Venue	Opponent	Score	Result	Competition
1	28 August 2009	Turku, Finland	Italy	2–0	2–0	Euro 2009
2	23 September 2009	Gothenburg, Sweden	Belgium	1–0	2–1	2011 World Cup qualification
3	26 February 2010	Vila Real de Santo António, Portugal	Iceland	4–1	5–1	2010 Algarve Cup
4	23 June 2010	Gothenburg, Sweden	Azerbaijan	10–0	17–0	2011 World Cup qualification
5	21 January 2011	Chongqing, China	United States	2–1	2–1	2011 Four Nations Tournament
6	31 March 2012	Malmö, Sweden	Canada	3–0	3–1	Friendly
7	15 September 2012	Gothenburg, Sweden	Netherlands	2–1	2–1	Friendly
8	23 October 2012	Växjö, Sweden	Switzerland	2–0	3–0	Friendly
9	8 March 2013	Albufeira, Portugal	Iceland	1–0	6–1	2013 Algarve Cup
10	8 March 2013	Albufeira, Portugal	Iceland	5–0	6–1	2013 Algarve Cup
11	13 March 2013	Lagos, Portugal	Norway	1–0	2–2 (pso 4–5)	2013 Algarve Cup
12	13 July 2013	Gothenburg, Sweden	Finland	3–0	5–0	UEFA Euro 2013
13	31 October 2013	Gothenburg, Sweden	Faroe Islands	3–0	5–0	2015 World Cup qualification
14	5 March 2014	Albufeira, Portugal	Denmark	1–0	2–0	2014 Algarve Cup
15	5 April 2014	Portadown, Northern Ireland	Northern Ireland	1–0	4–0	2015 World Cup qualification
16	14 June 2014	Motherwell, Scotland	Scotland	2–1	3–1	2015 World Cup qualification
17	14 June 2014	Motherwell, Scotland	Scotland	3–1	3–1	2015 World Cup qualification
18	21 August 2014	Starogard Gdański, Poland	Poland	2–0	4–0	2015 World Cup qualification
19	13 January 2015	La Manga, Spain	Norway	1–2	3–2	Friendly
20	13 January 2015	La Manga, Spain	Norway	2–2	3–2	Friendly
21	9 March 2015	Vila Real de Santo António, Portugal	China	1–0	3–0	2015 Algarve Cup
22	30 May 2015	Toronto, Canada	Netherlands	2–1	2–1	Friendly
23	02 June 2016	Łódź, Poland	Poland	3–0	4–0	Euro 2017 qualifying
24	6 June 2016	Gothenburg, Sweden	Moldova	2–0	6–0	Euro 2017 qualifying
25	6 June 2016	Gothenburg, Sweden	Moldova	4–0	6–0	Euro 2017 qualifying
26	8 March 2017	Albufeira, Portugal	Russia	1–0	4–0	2017 Algarve Cup
27	8 March 2017	Albufeira, Portugal	Russia	3–0	4–0	2017 Algarve Cup
28	19 September 2017	Varaždin, Croatia	Croatia	2–0	2–0	2019 World Cup qualification
29	24 October 2017	Borås, Sweden	Hungary	3–0	5–0	2019 World Cup qualification
30	24 October 2017	Borås, Sweden	Hungary	5–0	5–0	2019 World Cup qualification
31	30 August 2018	Gothenburg, Sweden	Ukraine	3–0	3–0	2019 World Cup qualification
32	27 February 2019	Faro/Loulé, Portugal	Switzerland	3–1	4–1	2019 Algarve Cup
33	11 June 2019	Rennes, France	Chile	1–0	2–0	2019 FIFA World Cup
34	16 June 2019	Nice, France	Thailand	2–0	5–1	2019 FIFA World Cup
35	6 July 2019	Nice, France	England	1–0	2–1	2019 FIFA World Cup
36	3 September 2019	Liepāja, Latvia	Latvia	4–1	4–1	UEFA Euro 2022 qualifying
37	8 October 2019	Gothenburg, Sweden	Slovakia	1–0	7–0	UEFA Euro 2022 qualifying
38	23 February 2021	Paola, Malta	Malta	1–0	3–0	Friendly
39	30 July 2021	Saitama, Japan	Japan	3–1	3–1	2020 Summer Olympics
40	20 February 2022	Algarve, Portugal	Portugal	3–0	4–0	2022 Algarve Cup
41	7 April 2022	Gori, Georgia	Georgia	13–0	15–0	2023 World Cup qualification
42	7 April 2022	Gori, Georgia	Georgia	14–0	15–0	2023 World Cup qualification
43	12 April 2022	Gothenburg, Sweden	Republic of Ireland	1–1	1–1	2023 World Cup qualification
44	17 July 2022	Leigh, Greater Manchester, England	Portugal	4–0	5–0	UEFA Women's Euro 2022
45	19 August 2023	Brisbane, Australia	Australia	2–0	2–0	2023 FIFA Women's World Cup
46	5 December 2023	Málaga, Spain	Spain	2–1	3–5	2023–24 UEFA Women's Nations League
47	3 December 2024	Stockholm, Sweden	Serbia	2–0	6–0	UEFA Women's Euro 2025 qualifying play-offs
48	4 April 2025	Solna, Sweden	Italy	1–1	3–2	2025 UEFA Women's Nations League A
49	8 July 2025	Allmend Stadion Luzern, Lucerne, Switzerland	Poland	2–0	3–0	UEFA Women's Euro 2025
50	17 July 2025	Stadion Letzigrund, Zurich, Switzerland	England	1–0	2–2 (2–3 p)	UEFA Women's Euro 2025

== Honours ==
Linköpings FC

- Damallsvenskan: 2009, 2017
- Svenska Supercupen: 2009
- Svenska Cupen: 2008, 2009

Manchester City

- FA WSL: 2016
- FA WSL Continental Cup: 2016

Sweden

- Summer Olympics runner-up: 2016, 2020
- FIFA Women's World Cup third place: 2019., 2023
- Algarve Cup: 2018

Individual

- Swedish women's footballer of the year: 2017
- Swedish women's midfielder of the year: 2017
- Women's Golden Foot: 2022
