= Parvana Mirzaguliyeva =

Azerbaijani footballer (born 1988)

Personal information
- Date of birth: 15 April 1988 (age 38)
- Position: Defender

Senior career*
Years	Team	Apps	(Gls)
- Gömrükçü Baku

International career^{‡}
2004	Azerbaijan U19	1+	(0)
2010	Azerbaijan	5	(0)
- * Club domestic league appearances and goals ‡ National team caps and goals as of 25 August 2010

Parvana Mirzaguliyeva (Azerbaijani: Pərvanə Mirzəquliyeva; born 15 April 1988) is an Azerbaijani former footballer who played as a defender. She has been a member of the Azerbaijan women's national team since 2010.
