= List of foreign Damallsvenskan players =

This is a list of foreign players in Damallsvenskan, which commenced play in 1988. The following players must meet both of the following two criteria:

1. have played at least one Damallsvenskan game. Players who were signed by Damallsvenskan clubs, but only played in lower league, cup and/or European games, or did not play in any competitive games at all, are not included.
2. are considered foreign, determined by the following:

A player is considered foreign if she is not eligible to play for Sweden women's national football team.

More specifically,

- If a player has been capped on international level, the national team is used; if she has been capped by more than one country, the highest level (or the most recent) team is used.
- If a player has not been capped on international level, her country of birth is used, except those who were born abroad from Swedish parents or moved to Sweden at a young age, and those who clearly indicated to have switched her nationality to another nation.

The list is organized alphabetically first by country, then by player's name (surname and first name). Clubs listed are those which the player has played at least one Damallsvenskan game for.

In bold: players who have played at least one Damallsvenskan game in the most recent season (2023 Damallsvenskan), and are still at the clubs for which they have played. This does not include current players of an Damallsvenskan club who have not played an Damallsvenskan game in the current season.

== Africa (CAF) ==
=== Algeria ===
- Hanna Boubezari

=== Cameroon ===
- Gaëlle Enganamouit – Eskilstuna United, Rosengård – 2014–2016
- Easther Mayi Kith – Kristianstads DFF – 2022
- Alexandra Takounda – Djurgården – 2021

=== DR Congo ===
- **Flavine Mawete** – **Djurgården** – 2022–

=== Ghana ===
- Elizabeth Addo – Kvarnsveden, Djurgården – 2016–2017, 2021
- **Portia Boakye** – **Djurgården** – 2018–
- Sherifatu Sumaila – Djurgården – 2018

=== Ivory Coast ===
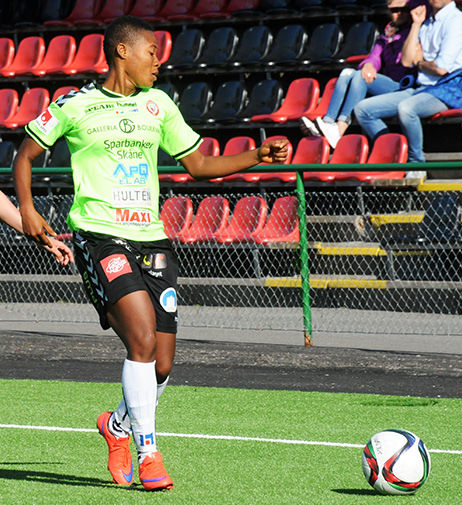
Ida Guehai

- Ida Guehai – Kristianstads DFF – 2015–

=== Malawi ===
- Tabitha Chawinga – Kvarnsveden – 2016–2017
- Temwa Chawinga – Kvarnsveden – 2017

=== Nigeria ===
- **Halimatu Ayinde** – Eskilstuna United, **Rosengård** – 2019–
- Rita Chikwelu – Umeå IK – 2010–
- Ogonna Chukwudi – Umeå IK, KIF Örebro, Kristianstads DFF, Djurgården – 2011–2019
- Josephine Chukwunonye – Vittsjö – 2016
- Onome Ebi – Piteå, Djurgården, Sunnanå – 2009–2010, 2013
- Faith Ikidi – QBIK, Linköping, Piteå – 2005–
- Anam Imo – Rosengård – 2019–
- Ulunma Jerome – Piteå – 2011
- Rebecca Kalu – Piteå – 2009
- Uchenna Kanu – Linköping – 2020–2021
- Yinka Kudaisi – QBIK – 2006
- Sarah Michael – Piteå, Djurgården, Örebro – 2009–
- Maureen Mmadu – QBIK, Linköping – 2006–2007
- Perpetua Nkwocha – Sunnanå – 2007–2010, 2013
- Osinachi Ohale – Vittsjö, Växjö DFF – 2017–2019
- Ngozi Okobi-Okeoghene – Vittsjö, Eskilstuna United – 2016–2022
- Francisca Ordega – Piteå – 2013–2014
- Helen Ukaonu – Sunnanå – 2013
- Ini-Abasi Umotong – Växjö DFF – 2020
- Cynthia Uwak – Falköping – 2007

=== South Africa ===
- Stephanie Malherbe – Djurgården – 2019
- Linda Motlhalo – Djurgården – 2020–2022
- Leandra Smeda – Vittsjö – 2019

=== Uganda ===
- Ritah Kivumbi
- **Violah Nambi** – Växjö DFF, **IFK Kalmar** – 2019–2020, 2022–

== Asia (AFC) ==
=== Australia ===
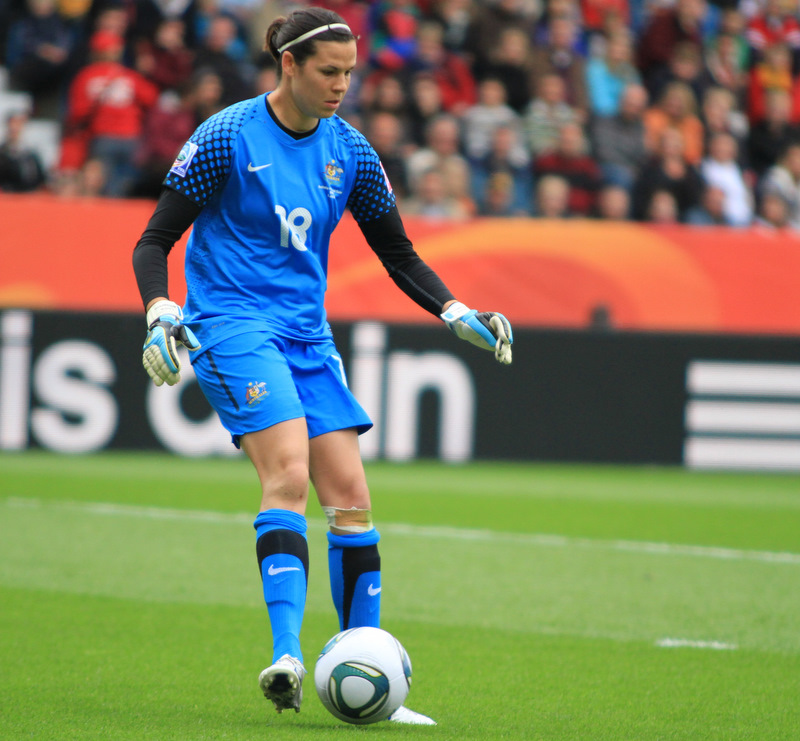
Lydia Williams

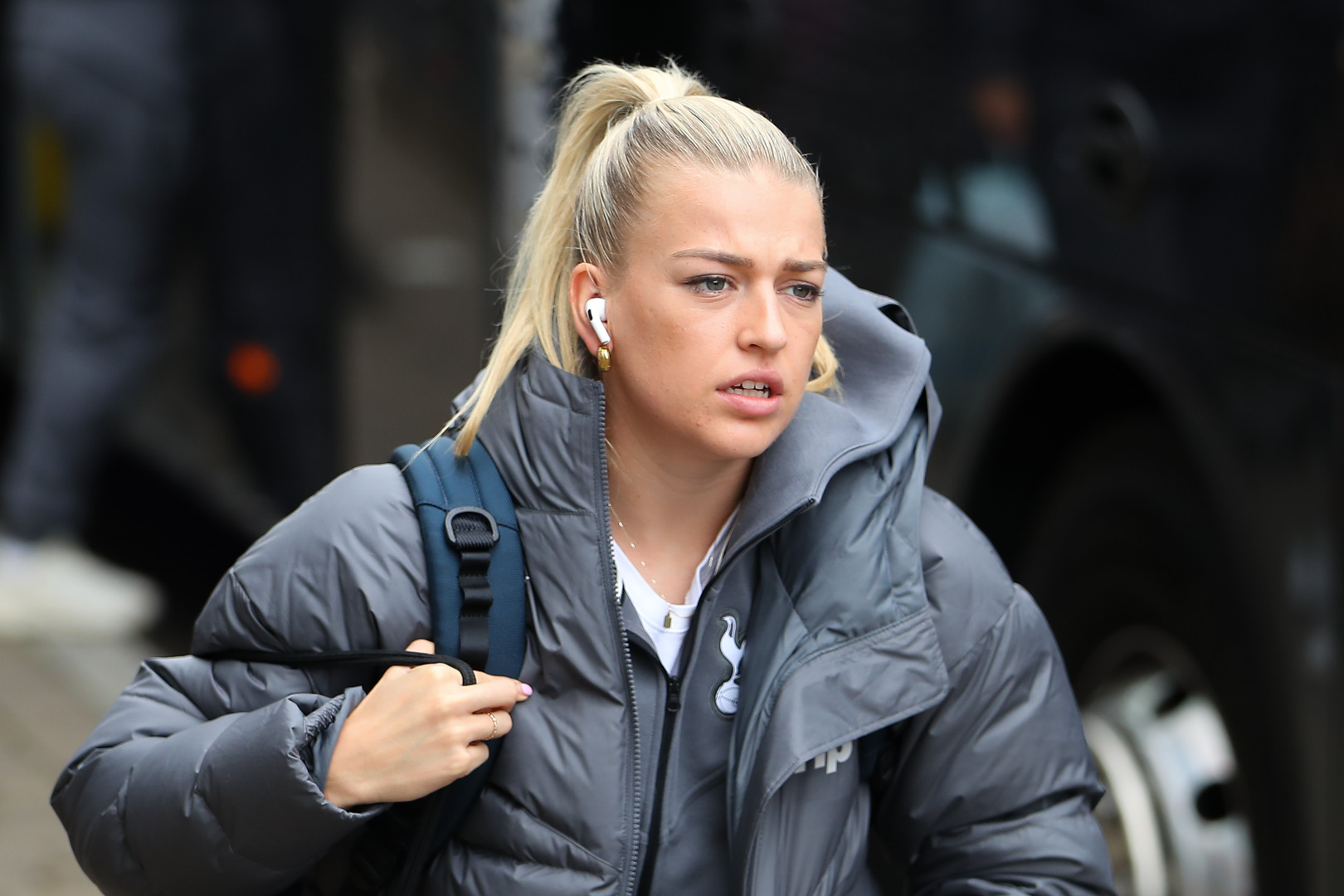
Charli Grant

- Nicole Begg – Kristianstads DFF – 2013
- Tameka Butt – Mallbacken – 2016
- Emma Checker – Umeå IK – 2022
- Kyra Cooney-Cross – Hammarby – 2022–2023
- Brianna Davey – Linköping – 2013
- Lisa De Vanna – AIK, Linköping – 2008, 2012
- Heather Garriock – Rosengård – 2011
- Emily Gielnik – Vittsjö – 2020–2021
- Kate Gill – AIK, Sunnanå, Rosengård, Linköping – 2008–2011
- Katrina Gorry – Vittsjö – 2022–2024
- Charli Grant – Rosengård, Vittsjö – 2021–2024
- Winonah Heatley – Växjö DFF – 2021
- Elise Kellond-Knight – Kristianstads DFF, Hammarby – 2018, 2020–2022
- Chloe Logarzo – Eskilstuna United – 2016
- Aivi Luik – IFK Kalmar, Häcken – 2018, 2022–
- Teagan Micah – Rosengård – 2021–2023
- **Courtney Nevin** – Hammarby – 2022–2023, **Malmö** – 2025–
- Joanne Peters – KIF Örebro – 2005
- Clare Polkinghorne – Vittsjö – 2021–
- Remy Siemsen – AIK, Kristianstad – 2022, 2024–
- Stacey Stocco – Jitex – 2006
- Lydia Williams – Piteå – 2012–2013

=== China ===
- Ma Xiaoxu – Umeå IK – 2007

=== Chinese Taipei ===
- Michelle Pao – Vittsjö – 2015

=== Japan ===
- **Maika Hamano** – **Hammarby** – 2023–
- Honoka Hayashi – AIK – 2021–2022
- **Yuka Momiki** – Linköping – 2020–
- Aya Noguchi – Linköping – 2014
- **Saori Takarada** – **Linköping** – 2022–
- Mami Yamaguchi – Umeå IK, Hammarby – 2008-2009, 2011

=== Philippines ===
- Katrina Guillou – Piteå – 2021–

=== Thailand ===
- Miranda Nild – Kristianstads DFF – 2021

== Europe (UEFA) ==
=== Albania ===
- Dafina Memedov – Rosengård, Kristianstads DFF, Linköping – 2008–2009, 2011

=== Armenia ===
- Natasha Tcheki-Jamgotchian – AIK – 2022

=== Austria ===
- Simona Koren – Växjö DFF – 2018–2019

=== Belgium ===
- Marijke Callebaut – Hammarby, Djurgården – 2006–2009
- Femke Maes – Djurgården – 2008
- Lorca van de Putte – Kristianstads DFF – 2013–2017
- Tine Schryvers – Kristianstads DFF – 2017–2018

=== Bosnia and Herzegovina ===
- Eldina Ahmić – AIK – 2014–2015
- Azra Duraković – Tyresö – 2010
- Melisa Hasanbegović – Kvarnsveden – 2017
- Lidija Kuliš – Linköping – 2013
- Elma Smajić – Växjö DFF, IFK Kalmar – 2020–2022

=== Bulgaria ===
- Dessi Dupuy – KIF Örebro – 2021

=== Croatia ===
- Iva Landeka – Rosengård – 2016–2019

=== Czech Republic ===
- Irena Martínková – KIF Örebro – 2013–2014
- Lucie Martínková – KIF Örebro – 2013–2014
- Pavlína Ščasná – KIF Örebro, Rosengård – 2006–2010

=== Denmark ===
- Janni Arnth – Linköping – 2014–2018
- **Simone Boye Sørensen** – Rosengård, **Hammarby** – 2017–2018, 2022–
- **Sofie Bredgaard** – Linköping, **Rosengård** – 2020–
- Cecilie Breil Kramer – Vittsjö – 2015
- Tine Cederkvist – Rosengård – 2009–2010
- Dorte Dalum Jensen – Djurgården – 2006–2007
- Nina Frausing Pedersen – Rosengård – 2016
- Mariann Gajhede Knudsen – Linköping – 2011–2016
- Mille Gejl Jensen – Häcken – 2021–2022
- Line Geltzer Johansen – Kopparbergs/Göteborg – 2017
- Pernille Harder – Linköping – 2012–2016
- Dajan Hashemi – Linköping – 2018–2019
- Nanna Johansen – Rosengård – 2006–2007
- Amalie Jørgensen Vangsgaard – Linköping – 2021–2022
- Sofie Junge Pedersen – Rosengård, Vittsjö – 2015–2018
- **Kamilla Karlsen** – **Djurgården** – 2021–
- Maja Kildemoes – Linköping – 2017–2018
- Kathrine Larsen – Djurgården, Hammarby – 2020, 2022
- **Stine Larsen** – **Häcken** – 2021–
- Mie Leth Jans – Rosengård – 2019–
- Stina Lykke Borg – Kristianstads DFF – 2016
- Bonny Madsen – Malmö FF – 1990–1991
- Luna Nørgaard Gevitz – Häcken – 2021–2022
- Christina Ørntoft – Rosengård – 2008–2012
- Cathrine Paaske Sørensen – Linköping – 2009
- Katrine Pedersen – Djurgården – 2006
- Johanna Rasmussen – Umeå IK, Kristianstads DFF, Linköping – 2008–2009, 2011–2016, 2018
- Line Røddik Hansen – Tyresö, Rosengård – 2010–2015
- Julie Rydahl Bukh – Linköping – 2009
- Karina Sefron – Rosengård – 1990–1991
- Nicoline Sørensen – Rosengård – 2014
- Sofie Svava – Rosengård – 2019–
- Frederikke Thøgersen – FC Rosengård – 2022
- Sanne Troelsgaard Nielsen – Rosengård – 2017–
- Katrine Veje – Rosengård – 2011–2013

=== England ===
- Rebecca Angus – Jitex – 2011
- Anita Asante – Kopparbergs/Göteborg, Rosengård – 2012–2017
- Karen Bardsley – Linköping – 2011
- Natasha Dowie – Linköping – 2018
- Karen Farley – Hammarby, Tyresö – 1994–2000
- Katie Lockwood – KIF Örebro – 2022
- Jodie Taylor – Kopparbergs/Göteborg – 2013

=== Estonia ===
- Karina Kork – IFK Kalmar – 2022

=== Finland ===
- **Olga Ahtinen** – IF Limhamn Bunkeflo, **Linköping** – 2019–
- **Emmi Alanen** – Umeå IK, Vittsjö, Växjö DFF, **Kristianstads DFF** – 2013–
- Kaisa Collin – Eskilstuna United, AIK – 2019–2022
- Jenny Danielsson – Kristianstads DFF, Kungsbacka, AIK – 2016, 2019, 2021–2022
- **Adelina Engman** – Kopparbergs/Göteborg, Växjö DFF, **Hammarby** – 2015–2018, 2021–
- Christina Forssell – Hammarby – 2004–2005
- Tia Hälinen – Eskilstuna United – 2018–2019
- Nina Hietanen – Hammarby, Stattena – 2009
- Henna-Riika Honkanen – Umeå IK – 2022
- Tuija Hyyrynen – Umeå IK – 2011–2015
- Jessica Julin – Umeå IK, Kopparbergs/Göteborg, AIK, Stattena – 1998–1999, 2003–2009
- Heidi Kackur – Rosengård, Kopparbergs/Göteborg – 2003–2005
- **Juliette Kemppi** – AIK, **Växjö DFF**, IFK Kalmar – 2015, 2021–
- Emma Koivisto – Kopparbergs/Göteborg – 2018–
- **Vilma Koivisto** – Piteå, Umeå IK, **IFK Norrköping** – 2020, 2022–
- **Anna Koivunen** – Linköping, **IFK Kalmar** – 2021, 2023–
- **Heidi Kollanen** – **KIF Örebro** – 2019–
- Tinja-Riikka Korpela – Tyresö – 2014 (Note: Financial problems forced Tyresö FF to withdraw from the 2014 Damallsvenskan season. Up to that point they have played 7 matches (which were later cancelled by the Swedish Football Association). As these 7 matches effectively took place and match reports exist, players involved are considered in this list.)
- Katariina Kosola – Umeå IK – 2022
- Natalia Kuikka – Kopparbergs/Göteborg – 2019–
- Annika Kukkonen – Rosengård, Djurgården, Sunnanå, Örebro – 2011–2014, 2016
- Susanna Lehtinen – KIF Örebro – 2008–2015
- Caroline Lundberg – Djurgården, Kvarnsveden – 2011, 2016
- Milla-Maj Majasaari – AIK – 2021–2022
- Anne Mäkinen – Umeå IK, AIK – 2005–2006, 2008–2009
- Sanna Malaska – Sunnanå – 2004
- Heidi Matinlassi – Bälinge – 2006–2007
- Minna Meriluoto – Umeå Södra, Hammarby, Jitex, Vittsjö – 2008–2014
- Anni Miettunen – Umeå IK – 2022
- Mathilda Mörn – Djurgården – 2010–2011
- Minna Mustonen – Bälinge – 2006
- Katri Nokso-Koivisto – Bälinge, Jitex – 2007–2008, 2012
- Pernilla Nordlund – Umeå IK – 2010–2012
- Linda Nyman – Kungsbacka – 2019
- **Eva Nyström** – Umeå IK, **Hammarby** – 2020–
- **Ria Öling** – Växjö DFF, **Rosengård** – 2019–
- Laura Österberg Kalmari – Umeå IK, Djurgården, AIK – 2003–2009
- Elli Pikkujämsä – KIF Örebro – 2020–2022
- Leena Puranen – KIF Örebro, Hammarby, Jitex – 2008–2013
- **Jutta Rantala** – Kristianstads DFF, **Vittsjö** – 2020–
- **Amanda Rantanen** – KIF Örebro, **Linköping** – 2021–
- Anna-Kaisa Rantanen – Linköping, Djurgården, Jitex – 2004–2009, 2011
- Natalia Rickne – Djurgården – 2010–2012
- Maija Saari – Umeå IK, AIK, Mallbacken – 2009–2010, 2012–2015
- Essi Sainio – AIK – 2009
- **Linda Sällström** – Djurgården, Linköping, **Vittsjö** – 2008–2011, 2013–2018, 2022–
- Iina Salmi – Rosengård – 2016
- Emma Santamäki – AIK, Umeå IK – 2021–2022
- Caroline Sjöblom – Djurgården – 2011
- Wilma Sjöholm – Djurgården – 2018–2019
- Annica Sjölund – Älvsjö AIK, AIK, Jitex, Kopparbergs/Göteborg – 2002, 2008–2014
- Elina Sormunen – Umeå Södra – 2008
- Eveliina Summanen – KIF Örebro – 2019–
- Sanna Talonen – KIF Örebro – 2009–2015
- **Anna Tamminen** – **Hammarby** – 2021–
- Julia Tunturi – Eskilstuna United, Vittsjö – 2018–2022
- Petra Vaelma – Bälinge, Umeå Södra – 2006, 2008
- Sanna Valkonen – Umeå IK, AIK, KIF Örebro – 2002–2010
- Anna Westerlund – Umeå IK, Piteå – 2010–2013

=== France ===
- Sabrina Viguier – Kopparbergs/Göteborg, IF Limhamn Bunkeflo – 2014, 2016
- Annahita Zamanian – Kopparbergs/Göteborg – 2016–2018

=== Germany ===
- Nadine Angerer – Djurgården – 2008
- Eunice Beckmann – Linköping – 2013
- **Gina Chmielinski** – **Rosengård** – 2022–
- Ariane Hingst – Djurgården – 2007–2008
- **Rebecca Knaak** – **Rosengård** – 2022–
- Kathrin Längert – Rosengård – 2014–2015
- **Melina Loeck** – **Kristianstads DFF** – 2020–
- Jennifer Meier – QBIK, Djurgården – 2005–2009
- Anja Mittag – Rosengård – 2012–2015, 2017–2019
- Helen Nottebrock – Tyresö, Hammarby – 2010–2011
- **Charléne Nowotny** – **IFK Kalmar** – 2022–
- Kathleen Radtke – Rosengård – 2013–2014
- Bianca Rech – Sunnanå – 2005
- Stefanie Sanders – FC Rosengård – 2021–2022
- **Bianca Schmidt** – **Rosengård** – 2021–
- Michelle Wörner – Djurgården – 2016–2018

=== Greece ===
- Maria Yatrakis – QBIK – 2006–2007

=== Hungary ===
- **Anna Júlia Csiki** – **Häcken** – 2020–
- **Dóra Zeller** – **Häcken** – 2022–

=== Iceland ===
- Berglind Rós Ágústsdóttir – KIF Örebro – 2021–2022
- María Björg Ágústsdóttir – KIF Örebro – 2011
- **Agla María Albertsdóttir** – **Häcken** – 2022–
- Erla Steina Arnardóttir – Stattena, Mallbacken, Kristianstads DFF – 2003–2006, 2008–2011
- **Guðrún Arnardóttir** – Djurgården, **Rosengård** – 2019–
- Arna Ásgrímsdóttir – Kopparbergs/Göteborg – 2015–
- Sif Atladóttir – Kristianstads DFF – 2011–
- Ásgerður Stefanía Baldursdóttir – Kristianstads DFF – 2015–
- **Hlin Eiriksdóttir** – Piteå, **Kristianstads DFF** – 2021–
- Edda Garðarsdóttir – KIF Örebro – 2009–2012
- Hallbera Guðný Gísladóttir – Piteå, Djurgården, AIK, IFK Kalmar – 2012–2013, 2017, 2021–2022
- Svava Rós Guðmundsdóttir – Kristianstads DFF – 2019–2020
- Guðbjörg Gunnarsdóttir – Djurgården – 2009–2012, 2016–2020
- Guðrún Sóley Gunnarsdóttir – Djurgården – 2009
- Sara Björk Gunnarsdóttir – Rosengård – 2011–
- Soffía Arnþrúður Gunnarsdóttir – Jitex – 2014
- Ásthildur Helgadóttir – Rosengård – 2003–2007
- Þóra Björg Helgadóttir – Rosengård – 2007, 2010–2014
- Rakel Hönnudóttir – IF Limhamn Bunkeflo – 2018
- **Amanda Jacobsen Andradóttir** – **Kristianstads DFF** – 2022–
- Katrín Jónsdóttir – Djurgården, Umeå IK – 2011–2013
- Anna Björk Kristjánsdóttir – KIF Örebro – 2016
- Dóra María Lárusdóttir – Djurgården – 2011
- Hólmfríður Magnúsdóttir – Kristianstads DFF – 2009
- Guðný Björk Óðinsdóttir – Kristianstads DFF – 2009–2015
- Katrín Ómarsdóttir – Kristianstads DFF – 2010, 2012
- Anna Rakel Pétursdóttir – Linköping, Uppsala – 2019–2020
- Ingibjörg Sigurðardóttir – Djurgården – 2018–2019
- Sandra Sigurðardóttir – Jitex – 2011
- Dóra Stefánsdóttir – Rosengård – 2006–2010
- Elísa Viðarsdóttir – Kristianstads DFF – 2014–
- Margrét Lára Viðarsdóttir – Linköping, Kristianstads DFF – 2009–
- Ólína Guðbjörg Viðarsdóttir – KIF Örebro – 2009–2011
- Glódís Perla Viggósdóttir – Eskilstuna United, Rosengård – 2015–
- **Diljá Ýr Zomers** – **Häcken** – 2021–
- Emelía Óskarsdóttir – **Kristianstads DFF** – 2022–

=== Ireland ===
- Michele O'Brien – QBIK – 2007
- Fiona O'Sullivan – AIK, Piteå – 2010–2011
- Louise Quinn – Eskilstuna United – 2014–2016

=== Italy ===
- Pamela Conti – Eskilstuna United – 2014
- Anna Maria Picarelli – Kristianstads DFF – 2010

=== Latvia ===
- Nora Abolins – KIF Örebro – 2017

=== Montenegro ===
- Armisa Kuč – Kvarnsveden – 2017

=== Netherlands ===
- Mandy van den Berg – Vittsjö – 2012–2014
- **Sheila van den Bulk** – Djurgården, **Kristianstads DFF** – 2016–
- Daniëlle van de Donk – Kopparbergs/Göteborg – 2015
- Nathalie Geeris – Landvetter, Öxabäcks IF – 1998–1999
- Loes Geurts – Vittsjö, Kopparbergs/Göteborg – 2012–
- Lieke Martens – Kopparbergs/Göteborg, Rosengård – 2014–
- Manon Melis – Rosengård, Linköping, Kopparbergs/Göteborg – 2007–2015
- Renée Slegers – Djurgården, Linköping – 2011–
- Kirsten van de Ven – Tyresö, Rosengård – 2010–2015
- Maruschka Waldus – Mallbacken – 2015

=== North Macedonia ===
- Nataša Andonova – Rosengård – 2015–2017

=== Northern Ireland ===
- Jackie Burns – Häcken – 2022

=== Norway ===
- **Joanna Aalstad Bækkelund** – Eskilstuna United – 2022–
- Vilde Bøe Risa – Kopparbergs/Göteborg – 2019–
- Ann Mari Dovland – Piteå – 2012
- Cathrine Dyngvold – Kopparbergs/Göteborg – 2013
- **Heidi Ellingsen** – Linköping, **Växjö DFF** – 2021–
- Caroline Graham Hansen – Tyresö – 2013
- **Vilde Hasund** – **Hammarby** – 2022–
- Andrine Hegerberg – Kopparbergs/Göteborg, Häcken – 2013–2016, 2022
- Noor Hoelsbrekken Eckhoff – Eskilstuna United – 2021–2022
- Nora Holstad Berge – Linköping – 2010–2012
- Camilla Huseby – Djurgården – 2020
- Lisa-Marie Karlseng Utland – Rosengård – 2018–
- Lise Klaveness – Umeå IK – 2006–2007
- Kristine Lindblom – Jitex – 2010–2012
- Frida Maanum – Linköping – 2017–2021
- Kristine Minde – Linköping – 2014–
- Maren Mjelde – Kopparbergs/Göteborg – 2014
- Bente Nordby – Djurgården – 2006–2007
- Hilde Gunn Olsen – AIK, Linköping – 2014
- June Pedersen – Umeå IK, Piteå – 2007–
- Guro Pettersen – Piteå – 2020–2021
- Ingrid Ryland – Djurgården – 2018
- Ingrid Schjelderup – Linköping, Eskilstuna United – 2010–2011, 2016
- Reidun Seth – Jitex, Öxabäcks IF – 1995
- Elise Stenevik – Eskilstuna United – 2020–2022
- Ingvild Stensland – Kopparbergs/Göteborg – 2007–2008, 2011

=== Poland ===
- **Kayla Adamek** – **Vittsjö** – 2022–
- Patrycja Jerzak – Djurgården – 2017
- Luiza Pendyk – Tyresö, Mallbacken, Malmö FF – 1993, 1995–2001

=== Portugal ===
- Kimberly Brandão – Falköping – 2007
- Carolina Mendes – Djurgården – 2016
- Cláudia Neto – Linköping – 2014–2017
- Jéssica Silva – Linköping – 2014

=== Romania ===
- Andrea Herczeg – Kungsbacka – 2019

=== Russia ===
- **Alexsandra Lobanova** – Brommapojkarna, **Djurgården** – 2022–

=== Scotland ===
- Lee Alexander – Mallbacken – 2016
- Vaila Barsley – Eskilstuna United, Brommapojkarna – 2014–2022
- Fiona Brown – Eskilstuna United, Rosengård – 2017–
- Ifeoma Dieke – QBIK, Kristianstads DFF, Vittsjö, IFK Kalmar – 2007–2008, 2012–2018
- Mhairi Gilmour – Djurgården – 2002
- Lucy Graham – Mallbacken – 2015
- Nicky Grant – QBIK – 2007
- Hayley Lauder – Mallbacken, Vittsjö – 2013–2014
- Shannon Lynn – Vittsjö – 2014–2020, 2022
- Eilish McSorley – Mallbacken – 2015–2016
- Zoe Ness – Mallbacken – 2015–2016
- Jane Ross – Vittsjö – 2013–2015

=== Serbia ===
- Jelena Čanković – Växjö DFF, Rosengård – 2018–
- Milica Kostić – Eskilstuna United – 2022–
- Susanne Nilsson – Kopparbergs/Göteborg, AIK, Sunnanå – 2009–2010, 2012–2013
- Emilija Emma Petrović – Kristianstads DFF – 2021–

=== Slovakia ===
- Patrícia Fischerová – IFK Kalmar – 2022–

=== Slovenia ===
- Lara Ivanuša – Kvarnsveden – 2017

=== Spain ===
- Verónica Boquete – Tyresö – 2012–2014
- Jennifer Hermoso – Tyresö – 2013
- Celia Jiménez – Rosengård – 2018

=== Switzerland ===
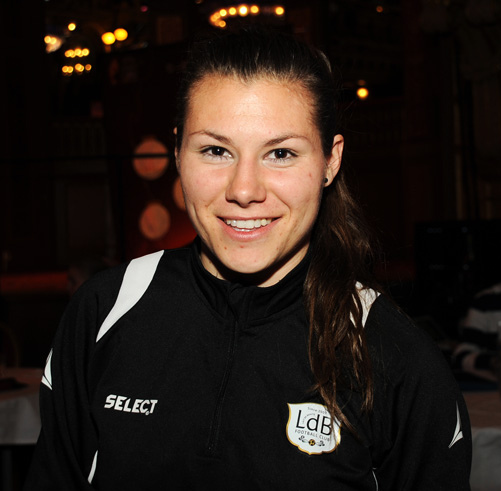
Ramona Bachmann

- Ramona Bachmann – Umeå IK, Rosengård – 2007–2009, 2011–2015
- Sandra Betschart – Kristianstads DFF, Sunnanå – 2011, 2013
- Kathrin Lehmann – Hammarby – 2007–2008
- **Livia Peng** – **Häcken** – 2022–

=== Turkey ===
- Sejde Abrahamsson – KIF Örebro, Hammarby, Piteå – 2012–2020
- Leyla Güngör – Kristianstads DFF – 2011
- Aylin Yaren – Rosengård – 2008–2009

=== Ukraine ===
- Vera Djatel – Linköping – 2015
- Nadiia Kunina – Linköping – 2021–

=== Wales ===
- Carys Hawkins – Sunnanå – 2013

== North and Central America, Caribbean (CONCACAF) ==
=== Canada ===
- Lindsay Agnew – KIF Örebro – 2020
- Marie-Yasmine Alidou – Linköping – 2018
- Brittany Baxter – Piteå – 2009
- Josée Bélanger – Rosengård – 2015
- Justine Bernier – AIK – 2015
- Gabrielle Carle – Kristianstads DFF – 2022
- Allysha Chapman – Eskilstuna United – 2014
- Paige Culver – IFK Kalmar – 2022
- Sabrina D'Angelo – Vittsjö – 2019–2022
- Nkem Ezurike – Vittsjö – 2016
- **Jenna Hellstrom** – Rosengård, Växjö DFF, **KIF Örebro** – 2017–
- Christina Julien – Jitex – 2012
- Kaylyn Kyle – Piteå – 2009
- Stephanie Labbé – Piteå, KIF Örebro – 2009, 2011–2014
- Erin McLeod – Dalsjöfors, Rosengård, Växjö DFF – 2011, 2017, 2019
- Carmelina Moscato – Piteå – 2011
- Marie-Ève Nault – KIF Örebro – 2013–2016
- Lisa Pechersky – KIF Örebro – 2022
- Quinn (Note: Initially known as Rebecca Quinn while with Vittsjö) – Vittsjö – 2020
- Erin Ramsay – Falköping – 2007
- Leah Robinson – QBIK – 2006
- Sophie Schmidt – Kristianstads DFF – 2012
- Sarah Stratigakis – Vittsjö – 2022–
- Melissa Tancredi – Piteå, KIF Örebro – 2011, 2016
- Amy Vermeulen – Bälinge – 2006
- Évelyne Viens – Kristianstads DFF – 2022–
- **Shannon Woeller** – Eskilstuna United, Växjö DFF, Brommapojkarna, **IFK Norrköping** – 2018–2019, 2021–
- Shelina Zadorsky – Vittsjö – 2015
- Emily Zurrer – Dalsjöfors, Jitex – 2011, 2014

=== Dominican Republic ===
- Brianne Reed – Kvarnsveden – 2017

=== Jamaica ===
- Chinyelu Asher – AIK – 2022
- Tiffany Cameron – Vittsjö – 2018
- Konya Plummer – AIK – 2021

=== Mexico ===
- Bri Campos – Umeå IK, Vittsjö – 2020–2022
- Amanda Perez – Vittsjö – 2019–
- Verónica Pérez – KIF Örebro – 2016
- Pamela Tajonar – Rosengård – 2011

=== Trinidad and Tobago ===
- Ahkeela Mollon – Djurgården – 2010
- Tasha St. Louis – Sunnanå – 2009

=== United States ===
• Jaida Nyby-Vittsjo-2024-

- Allison Abbe – AIK – 2022
- Danesha Adams – Vittsjö – 2012
- Michelle Akers – Tyresö – 1993–1994
- Brittany Anghel – AIK – 2014
- Julia Ashley – Linköping – 2019
- Julie Augustyniak – Stattena IF – 2004
- Nancy Augustyniak – Stattena IF – 2004
- Yael Averbuch – Kopparbergs/Göteborg – 2012–2013
- **Jessica Ayers** – **IFK Kalmar** – 2022–
- Madeline Bauer – Djurgården – 2018
- Katie Bethke – Mallbacken, Eskilstuna United – 2015–
- Rachel Bloznalis – Djurgården – 2020
- Brittany Bock – Vittsjö – 2012
- Kayla Braffet – KIF Örebro – 2019–
- Corinne Briers – Rosengård – 2005
- Lori Chalupny – AIK – 2012
- Kelly Conheeney – Hammarby – 2018
- Fanta Cooper – Bälinge – 2006
- **Aubrei Corder** – **IFK Kalmar** – 2022–
- Niki Cross – Umeå Södra – 2008
- Kelsey Daugherty – Djurgården – 2021–2022
- Hannah Davison – AIK – 2021–2022
- Kim DeCesare – Eskilstuna United – 2014
- Robyn Decker – Jitex, Kvarnsveden – 2014, 2016
- Monica Dolinsky – Mallbacken – 2015
- **Hayley Dowd** – **Djurgården** – 2021–
- Keeley Dowling – KIF Örebro – 2006–2007
- Kelly Eagan – Hammarby – 2011
- Becky Edwards – Hammarby, Kristianstads DFF – 2011–2012, 2014
- Sarah Elnicky – Kvarnsveden – 2016
- Whitney Engen – Tyresö – 2011, 2014
- Katie Eriksson – Jitex – 2006
- Caitlin Fischer – Hammarby – 2006
- Kendall Fletcher – Vittsjö – 2012–2013
- Tessa Florio-Gavilsky – Mallbacken – 2015
- Bri Folds – Kopparbergs/Göteborg – 2020
- Julie Foudy – Tyresö – 1993–1994
- Katlynn Fraine – Mallbacken, Linköping, Vittsjö, Växjö DFF, Eskilstuna United – 2013–2016, 2018–2022
- Tessa Gavilsky – Mallbacken – 2015–
- Adelaide Gay – Kvarnsveden – 2016
- Shawna Gordon – Umeå IK – 2014
- Lindsay Greco – Mallbacken – 2005
- Summer Green – Vittsjö – 2019–
- Annie Habeeb – IFK Kalmar – 2022
- Ashlyn Harris – Tyresö – 2013
- Mary Harvey – Hammarby, Tyresö – 1993–1994
- Valerie Henderson – KIF Örebro – 2011
- Rachel Hill – Linköping – 2020
- Venus James – Djurgården – 2004–2005
- Katie Kelly – Kristianstads DFF, Hammarby – 2010–2011
- Hana Kerner – Piteå – 2022
- Noelle Keselica – Bälinge – 2008
- Meghan Klingenberg – Tyresö – 2012–2014
- **Michaela Kovacs** – **KIF Örebro** – 2022–
- Ali Krieger – Tyresö – 2013
- Jennifer Lalor – Hammarby – 1999
- Taylor Leach – Kopparbergs/Göteborg – 2017–
- Camille Levin – Kopparbergs/Göteborg – 2012–2013
- Savannah Levin – Kopparbergs/Göteborg – 2017
- Kristine Lilly – Tyresö, KIF Örebro – 1994, 2005
- Joanna Lohman – Bälinge – 2008
- Kristin Luckenbill – QBIK – 2006
- Hailie Mace – Rosengård – 2019–
- Emily Madril – Häcken – 2022
- Kate Markgraf – KIF Örebro – 2005
- Brett Maron – Kristianstads DFF – 2009, 2013, 2015–2021
- Ella Masar – Rosengård – 2016–
- Blakely Mattern – Mallbacken – 2013
- Amanda McGlynn – Piteå – 2022
- Kia McNeill – Kristianstads DFF – 2008
- Rachel Mercik – Vittsjö – 2016
- Tiffeny Milbrett – Sunnanå, Linköping – 2005–2007
- Mary-Frances Monroe – KIF Örebro – 2005
- Caroline Murray – AIK – 2021–2022
- Jennifer Nobis – Umeå Södra, Piteå – 2008–2009, 2011–2012
- Jill Oakes – Falköping – 2007
- Alissa Oldenkamp – Kristianstads DFF – 2008
- Allison Pantuso – IFK Kalmar – 2022
- Jennifer Pelley – Djurgården – 2018–2019
- Katie Pingel – IFK Kalmar – 2022
- Christen Press – Kopparbergs/Göteborg, Tyresö – 2012–2014
- **Delaney Baie Pridham** – Kristianstads DFF – 2021–
- Denise Reddy – Rosengård – 1995–2005
- Elli Reed – Kristianstads DFF – 2013
- Danielle Rice – KIF Örebro – 2019–
- Jill Rutten – Umeå IK – 1996
- Kelly Schmedes – KIF Örebro – 2006
- Jessica Shufelt – Mallbacken – 2013
- Alex Singer – Dalsjöfors – 2011
- Maggie Smither – Brommapojkarna – 2022
- Hope Solo – Kopparbergs/Göteborg – 2004
- Emily Sonnett – Kopparbergs/Göteborg – 2020
- Natalie Spilger – Bälinge – 2008
- **Regan Steigleder** – **KIF Örebro** – 2022–
- Juliane Stich – Bälinge – 2006
- Maddy Talbot – Brommapojkarna – 2022
- Rashidat Sade Thomas-Ayinde – Kopparbergs/Göteborg – 2014
- **Tabby Tindell** – **Kristianstads DFF** – 2022–
- Megan Toohey – Kvarnsveden – 2016
- India Trotter – Dalsjöfors – 2011
- Alyssa Walker – IFK Kalmar – 2022
- Tiffany Weimer – AIK – 2010
- Ingrid Wells – Kopparbergs/Göteborg – 2012
- Christie Welsh – KIF Örebro – 2004
- Kacey White – Bälinge, AIK – 2006–2007
- **Carly Wickenheiser** – KIF Örebro, **Kristianstads DFF** – 2021–
- Antoinette Williams – IFK Kalmar – 2022
- Heather Williams – KIF Örebro – 2019–

== Oceania (OFC) ==
=== New Zealand ===
- CJ Bott – Vittsjö – 2018–2019
- Anna Green – Mallbacken – 2016
- **Erin Nayler** – Umeå IK – 2022–
- Ali Riley – Rosengård – 2012–2018, 2020
- Rebecca Smith – Sunnanå – 2005–2008
- Hannah Wilkinson – Vittsjö, Djurgården – 2017–2018, 2020
- Kirsty Yallop – Kristianstads DFF, Vittsjö, Mallbacken – 2010, 2012–2016

== South America (CONMEBOL) ==
=== Brazil ===
- Bárbara – Sunnanå – 2009–2010
- Cristiane – Linköping – 2008
- Daniela – Kopparbergs/Göteborg, Linköping – 2004, 2008
- Elaine – Umeå IK, Tyresö – 2005–2013
- Fernanda – Piteå, Vittsjö – 2019–2021
- Formiga – Rosengård – 2004–2005
- **Helena Sampaio** – Häcken – 2025–present
- Juliana Cabral – Kopparbergs/Göteborg – 2004
- Ketlen – Vittsjö – 2013
- Kóki – Rosengård – 2009
- Luana – Sunnanå – 2010
- Marina – Själevad – 2004
- Marta – Umeå IK, Tyresö, Rosengård – 2004–2008, 2012–2016
- Mayara – Tyresö – 2014
- Nildinha – Hammarby – 2010
- Rilany – Tyresö – 2014
- Thaisa – Tyresö – 2014

=== Chile ===
- Estíbaliz Montes de Oca – AIK – 2015
- Daniela Zamora – Djurgården – 2021

=== Colombia ===
- Yoreli Rincón – Rosengård – 2013

=== Peru ===
- Andrea Torisson – Rosengård – 2015–

== See also ==
- List of Damallsvenskan players
- List of foreign Allsvenskan players

== Notes ==
1. Born in Canada
2. Born in England
3. Born in Germany
4. Born in Kosovo
5. Born in Sweden
6. Born in the United Arab Emirates
7. Born in the United States
8. Capped for the Canada women's national football team
9. Capped for the Canada women's national under-17 football team
10. Capped for the Germany women's national under-17 football team
11. Capped for the Iceland women's national under-19 football team
12. Capped for the Sweden women's national under-15 football team
13. Capped for the Sweden women's national under-17 football team
14. Capped for the Sweden women's national under-19 football team
15. Capped for the Sweden women's national under-23 football team
16. Capped for the United States women's national under-23 football team
