= 2015 Elitettan =

Elitettan
- Season: 2015
- Champions: Kvarnsvedens IK
- Relegated: Lidköpings FK; Bollstanäs SK; Jitex BK
- Promoted to Damallsvenskan: Kvarnsvedens IK; Djurgården
- Matches: 182
- Goals: 641 (3.52 per match)
- Top goalscorer: Tabitha Chawinga (43 goals)
- Biggest home win: Djurgården 10–2 Älta IF (17 October 2015)
- Biggest away win: Lidköpings FK 0–6 Djurgårdens IF (11 April 2015)
- Highest scoring: Djurgården 10–2 Älta IF (17 October 2015)
- Longest winning run: 11 matches Kvarnsvedens IK
- Longest unbeaten run: 19 matches Kvarnsvedens IK
- Longest winless run: 13 matches Kungsbacka DFF
- Longest losing run: 8 matches Älta IF
- Highest attendance: 1,672; Kungsbacka DFF 0–0 IK Sirius (12 September 2015)
- Lowest attendance: 35; Älta IF 0–0 IFK Kalmar (30 May 2015)
- All statistics correct as of 30 August 2015.

2015 Elitettan was the 2015 season of the Swedish women's association football second-tier division, Elitettan.

== Teams ==
Team	Location	Stadium	Turf^{1}	Stadium capacity
Älta IF	Älta	Älta IP		1,000
Bollstanäs SK	Upplands Väsby	Bollstanäs IP		350
Djurgårdens IF	Stockholm	Stockholm Olympic Stadium		14,417
Hovås Billdal IF	Hovås	Hovåsvallen		1,000
IF Limhamn Bunkeflo	Bunkeflostrand	Limhamns IP		2,800
IFK Kalmar	Kalmar	Gröndals IP		1,500
IK Sirius	Uppsala	Studenternas IP		6,500
Jitex BK	Mölndal	Åbyvallen		6,000
Kungsbacka DFF	Frillesås	Tingbergsvallen		2,000
Kvarnsvedens IK	Borlänge	Ljungbergsplanen		1,000
Lidköpings FK	Lidköping	IP Framnäs		2,500
Östersunds DFF	Frösön	Jämtkraft Arena		6,028
QBIK	Karlstad	Tingvalla IP		10,000
Sunnanå SK	Skellefteå	Norrvalla IP		2,650

== League table ==
Pos	Team	Pld	W	D	L	GF	GA	GD	Pts	Promotion, qualification or relegation
1	Kvarnsvedens IK	26	21	3	2	76	15	+61	66	Promotion to Damallsvenskan
2	Djurgårdens IF	26	19	4	3	80	32	+48	61	Promotion to Damallsvenskan
3	IFK Kalmar	26	17	5	4	62	37	+25	56	
4	IF Limhamn Bunkeflo	26	15	5	6	61	35	+26	50	
5	Hovås Billdal IF	26	15	5	6	40	30	+10	50	
6	IK Sirius	26	12	8	6	39	27	+12	44	
7	Sunnanå SK	26	9	5	12	52	48	+4	32	
8	Östersunds DFF	26	7	7	12	41	54	−13	28	
9	QBIK	26	5	9	12	29	38	−9	24	
10	Kungsbacka DFF	26	6	6	14	34	55	−21	24	
11	Älta IF	26	6	5	15	37	71	−34	23	
12	Jitex BK	26	5	5	16	28	52	−24	20	Relegation to Division 1
13	Bollstanäs SK	26	5	3	18	29	69	−40	18	Relegation to Division 1
14	Lidköpings FK	26	3	4	19	33	78	−45	13	Relegation to Division 1

Source: svenskfotboll.se (in Swedish)
Rules for classification: 1) Points; 2) Goal difference; 3) Number of goals scored; 4) Head-to-head points; 5) Head-to-head goal difference; 6) Head-to-head away goals scored

== Results ==
Home \ Away	ÄIF	BSK	DIF	HBIF	IFLB	IFKK	IKS	JBK	KDFF	KIK	LFK	ÖDFF	QBI	SSK
Älta IF		3–5	0–1	1–1	1–5	1–4	1–2	1–0	3–2	0–0	3–1	0–4	0–1	0–3
Bollstanäs SK	2–1		0–0	0–1	0–3	4–1	5–1	1–2	0–0	1–2	1–3	2–3	1–1	0–2
Djurgårdens IF	10–2	3–1		4–0	5–1	4–0	1–1	3–1	5–2	3–2	5–1	7–1	1–0	3–1
Hovås Billdal IF	3–1	1–0	1–2		1–1	2–1	1–1	2–0	3–2	0–2	4–1	3–1	1–0	5–0
IF Limhamn Bunkeflo	6–1	3–0	1–1	5–0		2–1	3–0	2–0	3–3	1–4	3–0	2–1	2–1	2–1
IFK Kalmar	5–4	6–1	3–1	1–0	3–0		0–0	1–1	3–1	2–1	4–2	3–3	4–1	4–3
IK Sirius	2–1	4–0	2–0	0–2	2–1	0–2		3–0	5–0	1–2	3–3	1–1	2–1	1–0
Jitex BK	2–3	6–0	1–5	0–1	0–2	1–1	0–3		2–1	0–5	0–3	0–0	3–0	2–1
Kungsbacka DFF	1–1	2–0	0–1	1–2	1–3	2–4	0–0	3–1		0–3	2–0	3–2	0–0	1–0
Kvarnsvedens IK	4–0	5–0	7–2	2–0	1–0	1–1	1–0	2–0	4–0		4–0	6–0	3–0	2–2
Lidköpings FK	2–3	3–5	0–6	1–2	1–0	1–3	1–1	2–2	2–2	1–6		1–3	0–2	0–3
Östersunds DFF	2–2	4–0	1–3	0–1	2–5	0–2	0–0	1–0	4–2	0–3	4–2		2–2	1–2
QBIK	0–0	2–0	1–1	0–0	3–3	1–2	0–1	5–3	0–1	0–1	3–1	1–1		1–2
Sunnanå SK	3–4	7–0	2–3	3–3	2–2	0–1	1–3	1–1	4–2	1–3	4–1	1–0	3–3	

Updated to match(es) played on 17 October 2015. Source: svenskfotboll.se (in Swedish)
Legend: Blue = home team win; Yellow = draw; Red = away team win.

== Top scorers ==
As of 20 October 2015

Rank	Player	Club	Goals
1	(Malawi) Tabita Chawinga	Kvarnsvedens IK	43
2	(Sweden) Mia Jalkerud	Djurgårdens IF	29
3	(Sweden) Madeleine Stegius	Djurgårdens IF	18
4	(Sweden) Christine Tjärnlund	Sunnanå SK	16
5	(Sweden) Anna Welin	IF Limhamn Bunkeflo	15
6	(Finland) Caroline Lundberg	IK Sirius	14
6	(Sweden) Mathilda Prakt	IFK Kalmar	14
8	(Sweden) Emma Jones	IFK Kalmar	13
9	(Sweden) Amanda Fredriksson	IFK Kalmar	12
10	(Sweden) Karin Lundin	Kungsbacka DFF	11
10	(Sweden) Pernilla Milton	Hovås Billdal IF	11
