= Robyn Decker =

American soccer defender

Personal information
- Full name: Robyn Elizabeth Decker
- Date of birth: January 17, 1987 (age 39)
- Place of birth: Connecticut, United States
- Position: Defender

College career
Years	Team	Apps	(Gls)
2005–2008	Fairfield Stags	84	

Senior career*
Years	Team	Apps	(Gls)
2011–2012	QBIK	43	(4)
2013	Hovås Billdal IF	26	(2)
2014	Jitex BK	0	(0)
2015	Hovås Billdal IF	25	(0)
2016–2017	Kvarnsvedens IK	40	(0)
2017–2018	AGSM Verona	13	(1)
2018	Grand Bodø	15	(0)
2019–2021	Avaldsnes	57	(4)
- * Club domestic league appearances and goals as of April 28, 2020

Robyn Elizabeth Decker (born January 17, 1987) is an American soccer defender.

Decker attended Mercy High School in Middletown, Connecticut. She attended Fairfield University where she played 84 times for the Fairfield Stags between 2005 and 2008.
