= Mikaela Uthas =

Swedish footballer

Personal information
- Date of birth: 7 June 1992 (age 34)
- Height: 1.77 m (5 ft 9 1/2 in)
- Position: Defender

Team information
- Current team: Hovås Billdal IF
- Number: 5

Youth career
- Bankeryds SK

Senior career*
| Years | Team | Apps | (Gls) |
| 2012 | Dalsjöfors GoIF | 12 | (6) |
| 2012–2013 | Jitex BK | 13 | (0) |
| 2014–2015 | Djurgårdens IF | 49 | (8) |
| 2016– | Hovås Billdal IF | | |
- * Club domestic league appearances and goals as of 19 October 2015

Mikaela Uthas (born 7 June 1992) is a Swedish football defender who currently plays for Hovås Billdal IF in the Elitettan. She has previously played for Djurgårdens IF and at the Damallsvenskan for Jitex BK.
