= Nicky Grant =

Scottish footballer

Personal information
- Full name: Nichola Anne Grant
- Date of birth: 13 August 1976 (age 50)
- Place of birth: Aberdeen, Scotland
- Position: Midfielder

Senior career*
Years	Team	Apps	(Gls)
- Cove Rangers
- Cumbernauld United
–2001	Stenhousemuir		
2001	ÍBV	10	(3)
2002	Arsenal		
2002–2003	Glasgow City		
2003	1. FFC Frankfurt		
2003–2005	Kilmarnock Ladies		
2005	Doncaster Rovers Belles		
2005–2006	Hibernian Ladies		
2006–2010	Hamilton Academical Ladies		
2007	QBIK		
2011	Celtic Ladies		
2011	Hamilton Academical Ladies		
2012	Forfar Farmington		

International career^{‡}
1993–2006	Scotland	98	(7)
- * Club domestic league appearances and goals as of 12:00, 19 June 2011 (UTC) ‡ National team caps and goals as of 12:00, 19 June 2011 (UTC)

Nichola Anne "Nicky" Grant (born 13 August 1976) was a Scottish international footballer, who played as a midfielder. She last played professionally in the Scottish Women's Premier League for Forfar Farmington, having previously played in England for Arsenal and Doncaster Rovers Belles as well as in Iceland, Germany and Sweden. Grant amassed over 90 appearances for the Scotland women's national football team.

== Club career ==
Born in Aberdeen and brought up in Elgin, Grant first came to prominence as a member of a successful Cove Rangers team, where she signed an individual paid contract (the first such deal in Scottish football). She scored twice in the 1995 Scottish Women's Cup final as Cove beat Cumbernauld United 5–1 at McDiarmid Park, and twice in the 1996 final as they defeated Aberdeen by the same score at the same venue. They won the trophy for the third time in 1997. After switching to Cumbernauld United, Grant won a domestic treble in 1997–98.

In the 2000 Scottish Women's Cup final, Grant scored four goals in Stenhousemuir's 9–0 win over Clyde.

Grant spent the 2001 summer season in Iceland with ÍBV and scored three goals in ten Úrvalsdeild appearances. She then collected an FA Women's Premier League winners medal with Arsenal Ladies in 2002, but did not wish to move to London long-term. In 2003 Grant joined Frauen Bundesliga champions 1. FFC Frankfurt as a full–time professional. She did not remain in Germany for long due to injuries and returned to Scotland to work as a teacher while playing for Kilmarnock.

In January 2005, Grant rejected an approach from Sunderland in favour of Doncaster Rovers Belles. Grant helped Doncaster avoid relegation by scoring the second goal in a vital 2–0 win over Bristol City, but she was sent off for removing her shirt in celebration.

In summer 2007 she joined Swedish Damallsvenskan club QBIK at the invitation of international teammate Ifeoma Dieke.

After a spell at Hamilton Academical, Grant signed for Celtic in 2011. She returned to Accies during the Scottish Women's Premier League mid–season break. Grant signed for Forfar Farmington ahead of the 2012 season, after moving to the Angus area for work reasons.

== International career ==
Grant made her senior debut for Scotland against Italy in October 1993. The Scots were beaten 4–0 in the 1995 UEFA Women's Championship qualification match hosted in Senigallia.

In summer 2003 Grant had a disagreement with the Scotland management team and spent a year out of the national team. She was recalled in July 2004 after her Kilmarnock Ladies manager Jim Chapman interceded.

== Career outwith playing ==
Nicky taught at schools in West Lothian where her principal subject was physical education and she became depute head at Kemnay Academy, Aberdeenshire. In 2016 Nicky was appointed depute head teacher at Elgin High School with Moray Council. In December 2018 she was appointed as the head teacher of Alness Academy.

In October 2019 she was appointed as head of education services at Highland Council and was promoted to education ECO in July 2021. She left the post in April 2024. In November 2024 she took on the role of operations and commercial manager at Elgin City F.C..

== Personal life ==
Grant's brother Graeme is also a footballer, who played with Buckie Thistle and Forres Mechanics in the Highland Football League, as well as spending 2002–03 with Elgin City in the Scottish Football League Third Division.
