= Sara Ikonen =

Finnish footballer (born 2004)

Personal information
- Date of birth: 3 June 2004 (age 22)
- Place of birth: Finland
- Position: Defender

Team information
- Current team: Eskilstuna United

Youth career
- –2020: ONS

Senior career*
Years	Team	Apps	(Gls)
2020–2023	ONS	37	(0)
2022	→ HauPa (loan)	2	(0)
2023–2024	KIF Örebro	24	(0)
2025–	Eskilstuna United	0	(0)

International career^{‡}
2019	Finland U17	3	(0)
2022–2023	Finland U19	11	(0)
2023–	Finland U23	4	(0)
- * Club domestic league appearances and goals as of 31 December 2024 ‡ National team caps and goals as of 31 December 2024

Sara Ikonen (born 3 June 2004) is a Finnish professional footballer plays as a defender for Eskilstuna United.
