= Sarah Storck =

Swedish footballer

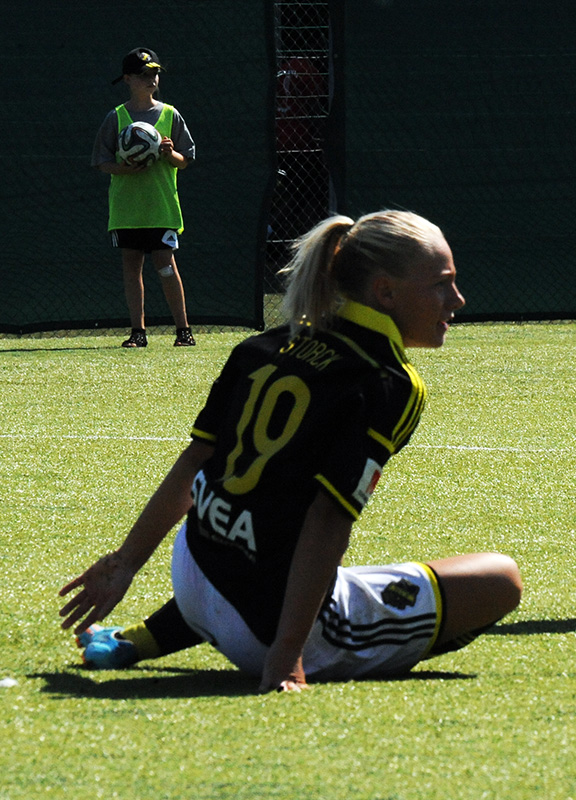

Personal information
- Date of birth: 22 September 1990 (age 36)
- Place of birth: Uppsala, Sweden
- Height: 1.60 m (5 ft 3 in)
- Position: Forward

Senior career*
Years	Team	Apps	(Gls)
2008	Bälinge IF	17	(0)
2009–2012	LdB FC Malmö	14	(0)
2012–2013	IK Sirius FK	24	(8)
2014–2015	AIK FF	31	(6)
2016	Östersunds DFF	23	(11)
2017–2018	AIK FF	38	(8)

International career
	Sweden Under 17	1	(0)
	Sweden Under 19	14	(3)
	Sweden Under 23	9	(3)
- * Club domestic league appearances and goals

Sarah Storck is a Swedish former professional footballer who played as a forward in the Swedish league Damallsvenskan. Her first professional club was Bälinge IF, for which she played 17 times in the Damallsvenskan in 2008. In 2009 she moved to LdB FC Malmö. The next year she went on loan to Vittsjö GIK. She later played for IK Sirius FK. Her last club was AIK. She retired from professional football after the 2018 season. At the international level, she represented Sweden in the Under-17, Under-19 and Under-23 teams.

Storck was instrumental in Malmö winning the Supercup in 2011, a match held just prior to the start of the 2011 Damallsvenskan season between league champions Malmö and cup winners Örebro. She scored the first goal for Malmö and, in the final minutes of extra time, hit the cross-bar, with the oncoming Manon Melis scoring from the rebound. She played two matches in the 2011–12 UEFA Women's Champions League for Malmö.
