= Östersunds DFF =

Swedish football club

- Founded: 2001; 24 years ago
- Ground: Jämtkraft Arena, Östersund
- Capacity: 8,466
- Chairman: Hans-Olov Johansson
- Manager: Leif Widegren
- League: Elitettan

Östersunds DFF is a Swedish football club in Östersund, Sweden. The club was formed 2001 as a co-operation between two Östersund clubs, originally using the name Storsjöns DFF, which was later changed to Ope-Frösö DFF and finally to Östersunds DFF in 2004. They are affiliated to the Jämtland-Härjedalens Fotbollförbund and play their home games at Jämtkraft Arena.

In October 2014, the club was promoted to Elitettan, the second tier of women's football in Sweden, for the first time in club history, and it finished in 8th place in 2015.

== Current squad ==
Note: Flags indicate national team as defined under FIFA eligibility rules; some limited exceptions apply. Players may hold more than one non-FIFA nationality.

| No. | Pos. | Nation | Player |
|---|---|---|---|
| 1 | GK | (Sweden) SWE | Emelie Almesjö |
| 2 | DF | (Sweden) SWE | Elin Kristiansson |
| 5 | DF | (Sweden) SWE | Caroline Röstlund |
| 6 | DF | (United States) USA | Mykaylin Rosenquist |
| 7 | MF | (Sweden) SWE | Emma Danielsson |
| 9 | FW | (Sweden) SWE | Sarah Storck (captain) |
| 13 | DF | (Sweden) SWE | Terese Kristoffersson |
| 18 | MF | (Australia) AUS | Jessica Nagel |
| 22 | DF | (Sweden) SWE | Malin Winberg |
| 23 | MF | (Sweden) SWE | Rebecca Rulander |

== Season to season ==
| Season | Level | Division | Section | Position | Movements |
|---|---|---|---|---|---|
| 2012 | Tier 4 | Division 2 | Södra Norrland | 1st | Promoted |
| 2013 | Tier 3 | Division 1 | Norra Svealand | 3rd | |
| 2014 | Tier 3 | Division 1 | Norra Svealand | 1st | Promoted |
| 2015 | Tier 2 | Elitettan | | 8th | |
