= Violah Nambi =

Ugandan footballer (born 1995)

Personal information
- Full name: Violah Nambi Ssebunya
- Date of birth: 14 July 1995 (age 31)
- Place of birth: Uganda
- Positions: Winger; striker

Senior career*
Years	Team	Apps	(Gls)
2019–2020	Växjö DFF	21	(3)
2021	Dornbirn		
2022–2023	IFK Kalmar	23	(2)
2023–2024	Pomigliano	26	(1)
2024	Napoli	3	(0)

International career
- Uganda
- * Club domestic league appearances and goals as of 16:41, 21 December 2025 (UTC).

Violah Nambi Ssebunya (born 14 July 1995) is a Ugandan professional footballer who plays as a winger or striker for the Uganda national team.

== Early life ==
Nambi attended St. Mary's Kitende in Uganda.

== Club career ==
Nambi played for Swedish side Växjö DFF, where she was described as "Växjö's sharpest weapon" and "became an offensive sensation at the end of the 2019 season". She suffered an injury while playing for the club.

After that, Nambi played for Austrian side FC Dornbirn 1913, where she was described as "expected to contribute to the promotion with the decisive goals". She then played for Swedish side IFK Kalmar, where she was regarded as one of the club's most important players.

== International career ==
Nambi has been regarded to have struggled to be available even when called up to the Uganda women's national football team.

== Style of play ==
Nambi mainly operates as a winger or striker and is known for her speed.

== Personal life ==
Nambi has been a Christian.
