= Marie Salander =

Swedish footballer

Personal information
- Full name: Marie Salander
- Date of birth: 25 October 1985 (age 41)
- Place of birth: Sweden
- Position: Defender

Team information
- Current team: Kvarnsvedens IK
- Number: 13

Senior career*
Years	Team	Apps	(Gls)
2011–	Kvarnsvedens IK	215	(15)
- * Club domestic league appearances and goals as of 15 June 2020 (UTC)

Marie Salander (born 25 October 1985) is a Swedish football defender who plays for Kvarnsvedens IK.
