= Luiza Pendyk =

Polish footballer

Personal information
- Full name: Luiza Pendyk
- Date of birth: 23 September 1970 (age 56)
- Place of birth: Lubań, Poland
- Position: Forward

Senior career*
Years	Team	Apps	(Gls)
- AZS Wrocław
- Czarni Sosnowiec
1990–1994	Tyresö FF		
1995	Mallbackens IF		
1996–2000	Malmö FF		
2001	Malmö FF		
2002	Staffanstorps GIF		

International career
1987–1992	Poland	25	(6)
- * Club domestic league appearances and goals

Luiza Pendyk (born 23 September 1970) is a Polish former professional footballer who played as a forward. Capped 25 times for the Poland women's national team, at club level she played for multiple teams in Sweden and was the Damallsvenskan top goal scorer on two occasions.

== Club career ==
Born in Lubań and raised in Wrocław, Pendyk emerged with the AZS Wrocław club. She transferred to Czarni Sosnowiec and quickly became recognised as one of the best players in the country.

Pendyk continued her football career in Sweden, initially with Tyresö FF. In a long and successful spell in Swedish football she was the Damallsvenskan top goal scorer on two consecutive occasions: 1999 and 2000.

After five seasons with Malmö FF, Pendyk retired from football to focus on her studies. However, she agreed to return to the club part way through the following 2001 season, after which she retired again. Altogether Pendyk scored 163 goals in 161 games for Malmö.

In July 2002, Pendyk agreed to join local lower division team Staffanstorps GIF, where some former Malmö teammates also played. She finished the 2002 Söderettan season with seven goals to her credit. She decided to remain in Sweden after her football career and took Swedish citizenship.

== International career ==
Pendyk won her first cap for Poland on 27 June 1987, in a 1–1 friendly draw with Czechoslovakia at BKS Stadium, Bielsko-Biała. She scored an equaliser with two minutes left in the match after entering play as a 39th-minute substitute. The goal was a "beautiful" header from 16 metres.

After moving to play club football in Sweden, Pendyk fell into dispute with the Polish national team and made herself unavailable for selection. Her 25th and final appearance was as captain in a 4–1 UEFA Women's Euro 1993 qualifying defeat by Italy at WKS Wawel Stadium in Kraków on 27 September 1992.

The Swedish Football Association made an unsuccessful attempt to naturalise Pendyk to play for the Sweden women's national football team. The plan failed because Pendyk's earlier appearances for Poland made her ineligible under FIFA rules to switch her allegiances.

== Career statistics ==
=== International ===
Appearances and goals by national team and year
National team	Year	Apps	Goals
Poland	1987	1	1
Poland	1988	2	2
Poland	1989	5	1
Poland	1990	2	0
Poland	1991	11	2
Poland	1992	4	0
Total		25	6

Scores and results list Poland's goal tally first, score column indicates score after each Pendyk goal.

List of international goals scored by Luiza Pendyk
No.	Date	Venue	Cap	Opponent	Score	Result	Competition
1	27 June 1987	BKS Stadium, Bielsko-Biała, Poland	1	Czechoslovakia	1–1	1–1	Friendly
2	26 June 1988	Samokov, Bulgaria	2	Bulgaria	1–0	1–2	Friendly
3	16 October 1988	Stadion Ludowy, Sosnowiec, Poland	3	Hungary	1–1	2–1	Friendly
4	27 June 1989	Tempio Pausania, Sardinia, Italy	5	Soviet Union	1–0	2–1	Friendly
5	25 June 1991	Pula, Sardinia, Italy	16	Greece	1–0	2–0	Friendly
6	6 September 1991	Skra Stadium, Częstochowa, Poland	18	Soviet Union	1–1	2–1	Friendly

== Honours ==
Czarni Sosnowiec

- Ekstraliga: 1988–89
- Polish Cup: 1988–89

Individual

- Damallsvenskan top scorer: 1999, 2000
