= Hallbera Guðný Gísladóttir =

Icelandic footballer (1986)

Hallbera G. Gísladóttir
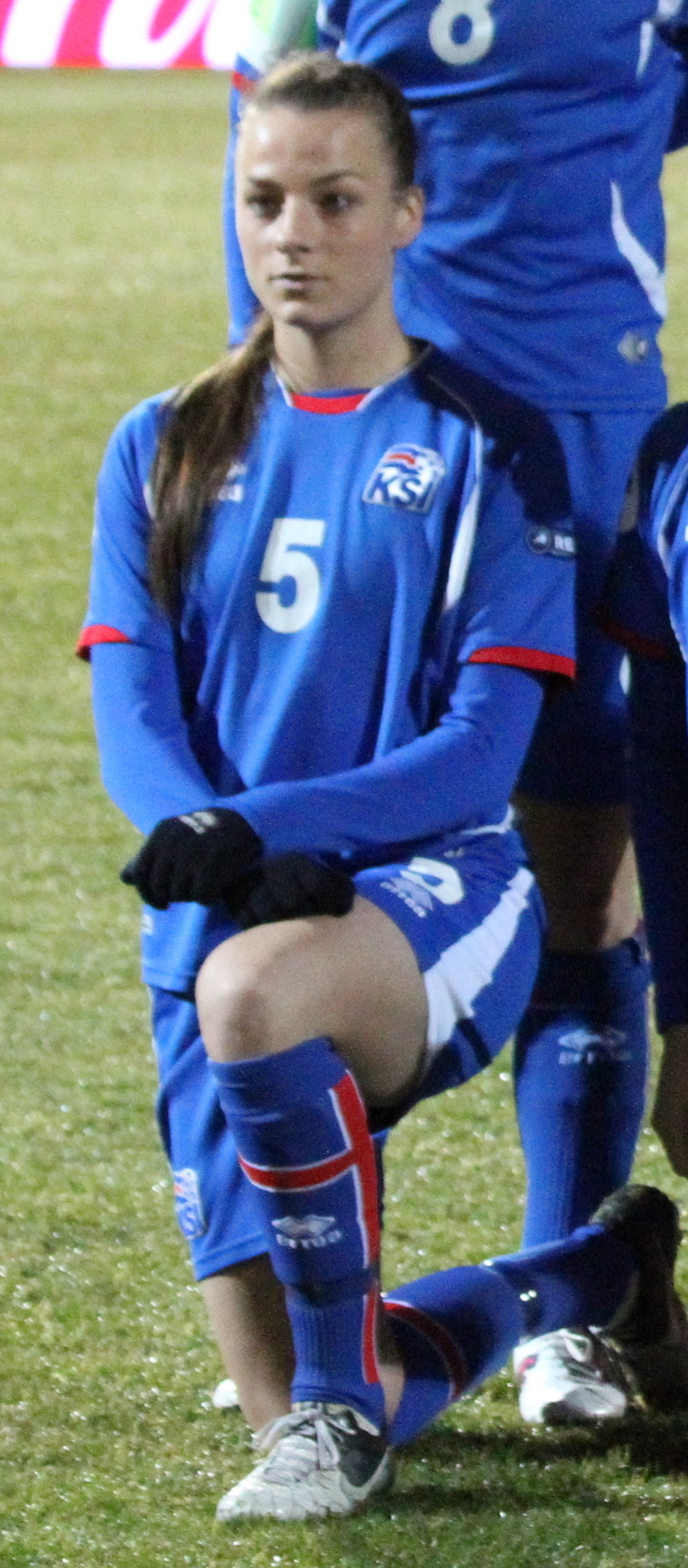
- Before Iceland's Euro 2013 play-off against Ukraine in October 2012

Personal information
- Full name: Hallbera Guðný Gísladóttir
- Date of birth: 14 September 1986 (age 40)
- Place of birth: Akranes, Iceland
- Height: 5 ft 6 in (1.68 m)
- Positions: Left-back; left wing

Team information
- Current team: IFK Kalmar
- Number: 23

Youth career
- ÍA

Senior career*
Years	Team	Apps	(Gls)
2005	ÍA	14	(1)
2006–2011	Valur	96	(31)
2012–2013	Piteå IF	40	(1)
2014	Torres	13	(1)
2014	Valur	10	(0)
2015–2016	Breiðablik	36	(2)
2017	Djurgårdens IF	22	(0)
2018–2020	Valur	51	(1)
2021	AIK	12	(0)
2022-	IFK Kalmar	2	(0)

International career^{‡}
2003	Iceland U-17	7	(0)
2003–2004	Iceland U-19	9	(0)
2005	Iceland U-21	2	(0)
2008–	Iceland	128	(3)
- * Club domestic league appearances and goals as of 28 January 2019 ‡ National team caps and goals as of 13:16, 7 December 2021 (UTC)

Hallbera Guðný Gísladóttir (born 14 September 1986) is an Icelandic footballer who plays for Swedish Damallsvenskan club IFK Kalmar and the Iceland national team. Although primarily a left-back, she can also play further forward as a left winger.

== Club career ==
She played for Valur from 2006 to 2011 before moving to Sweden. In December 2011 Hallbera went on trial with KIF Örebro DFF who made a contract offer, but she opted to join Piteå instead.

In 2014, she joined Torres of the Italian women's Serie A.

== International career ==
Hallbera made her senior international debut at the 2008 edition of the Algarve Cup, in a 2–0 win over Poland.

She was called up to be part of the national team for the UEFA Women's Euro 2013.

== Personal life ==
Hallbera's father Gísli Gíslason is a former mayor of Akranes.

== Honours ==
=== Club ===
Valur

Winner

- Úrvalsdeild: 2006, 2007, 2008, 2009, 2010, 2019
- Icelandic Women's Cup: 2006, 2009, 2010, 2011
