= Umeå Södra FF =

- Full name: Umeå Södra FF
- Nickname(s): USFF
- Founded: 1982
- Ground: Gammliavallen, Umeå
- Capacity: 9,000
- Manager: Torbjörn Nordström
- League: Damallsvenskan

Umeå Södra FF is a football club from Umeå, Sweden. The club was established in 1982 with the merging of Röbäcks IF and Tegs SK. The club qualified for the Damallsvenskan league on October 13, 2007, by defeating the Ornäs BK 4–0 in the second to last round of the Swedish Women's Northern Division 1. Once there in 2008, they ended up 11th, and was relegated.

The club includes U-12 through U-18 youth teams.

Umeå Södra FF play their home games at the Gammliavallen Stadium in Umeå. The team colours are yellow and blue.

== Current squad ==
As of 20 June 2008

Note: Flags indicate national team as defined under FIFA eligibility rules; some limited exceptions apply. Players may hold more than one non-FIFA nationality.

No.	Pos.	Nation	Player
1	GK	(Sweden) SWE	Jessica Lundberg
2	DF	(Sweden) SWE	Anna Rehn
3	DF	(Sweden) SWE	Maria Lundqvist
4	DF	(Sweden) SWE	Moa Westermark
5	DF	(Sweden) SWE	Kristin Åberg
6	MF	(Sweden) SWE	Victoria Forsmark
7	DF	(Sweden) SWE	Anna Forss
8	FW	(Sweden) SWE	Terese Andersson
9	MF	(Sweden) SWE	Patricia Hägglund
10	FW	(Sweden) SWE	Linda Fransson
11	FW	(Sweden) SWE	Vanessa Mångsén

No.	Pos.	Nation	Player
12	DF	(Sweden) SWE	Maria Wictorsson
13	GK	(Finland) FIN	Minna Meriluoto
15	DF	(Sweden) SWE	Ragna Lestander
16	MF	(Sweden) SWE	Emma Sundberg
17	MF	(Sweden) SWE	Hanna Folkesson
18	MF	(Finland) FIN	Elina Sormunen
19	FW	(United States) USA	Jennifer Nobis
20	FW	(Sweden) SWE	Mathilda Varmin
21	DF	(Finland) FIN	Petra Vaelma
24	GK	(Sweden) SWE	Amanda Janzén
