= Rosita Herreros =

Spanish footballer

Personal information
- Full name: Rosa Maria Herreros Ossorio
- Date of birth: 18 November 1992 (age 33)
- Place of birth: Palma de Mallorca, Spain
- Height: 1.55 m (5 ft 1 in)
- Position: Midfielder

Youth career
- 2007–2008: Penya Arrabal

Senior career*
Years	Team	Apps	(Gls)
2008–2014	Collerense		
2009–2011	Collerense B		
2014	Kokkola F10	22	(4)
2015	Cuneo	12	(2)
2015	Merilappi United	16	(0)
2016	Kokkola F10		
2016–2017	GBK	19+	(2+)
2018–2020	Åland United	63	(8)
2021	Umeå FC	25	(1)
2022–2023	IK Uppsala	26	(7)
2023–2024	Växjö DFF	12	(1)
2024	Eskilstuna United	3	(1)
- * Club domestic league appearances and goals

Rosa Maria Herreros Ossorio (born 18 November 1992) is a Spanish footballer who plays as a midfielder for Eskilstuna United DFF.

== Early life ==
Herreros is also known as "Rosita" and was born in 1992 in Mallorca, Spain. She began playing for a boys' football team at the age of four.

Herreros studied to become a physical education teacher in Spain.

== Playing career ==
Herreros started her career with Spanish side Penya Arrabal. After that, she signed for Spanish side Collerense, where she played alongside future Spain internationals Virginia Torrecilla and Patricia Guijarro. Herreros got an opportunity to play football in Finland through an Erasmus scholarship. Before the 2014 season, she signed for Finnish side Kokkola F10, where she wore the number 10 jersey in honor of former teammate Pili Espadas. Before the second half of 2014/15, she signed for Italian side Cuneo.

Before the 2016 season, she signed for Finnish second-tier side Kokkola F10, where she scored five goals, before signing for Finnish second-tier side GBK mid-season, where she recorded six assists, was named Man of the Match twice in six games, and helped the club earn promotion to the Finnish top flight. While playing for the club, she also worked as a baker. She was named 2016 Best Player of the Finnish second tier.

Before the 2018 season, she signed for Finnish top flight side Åland United, helping the club win the league and cup. While playing for the club, she was regarded as a fan favorite. She also experienced the coronavirus pandemic while playing for the club and was the first Spanish women's player to play an official game during the resulting lockdown. Despite initially experiencing difficulty adapting to Finland, she gradually became regarded as one of the most recognized and prominent footballers playing in the Finnish league during her time there. Before the 2021 season, she signed for Swedish second-tier side Umeå FC, helping them earn promotion to the Swedish top flight, before signing for Swedish second-tier side IK Uppsala, where she scored two goals in her first two appearances. A few years before signing for IK Uppsala, she wanted to quit professional football before changing her mind. During the 2022 season, she was regarded as one of IK Uppsala's most important players. She helped IK Uppsala achieve promotion to the Swedish top flight. Despite wanting to stay at the club for the 2023 season, her contract with the club was not renewed after the 2022 season. Before the 2023 season, she signed for Swedish top flight side Växjö DFF. However, she suffered a thigh injury upon arrival.

== Style of play ==
Herreros mainly operates as a center midfielder or attacking midfielder and is known for her ability to create attacking opportunities.

== Managerial career ==
While playing in Finland, Herreros managed a women's team and a girls' team.

== Personal life ==
Herreros began learning Finnish while playing there and working in a bakery. She has been the girlfriend of Finland international Anna Tamminen.
