= Guðbjörg Gunnarsdóttir =

Icelandic footballer (born 1985)

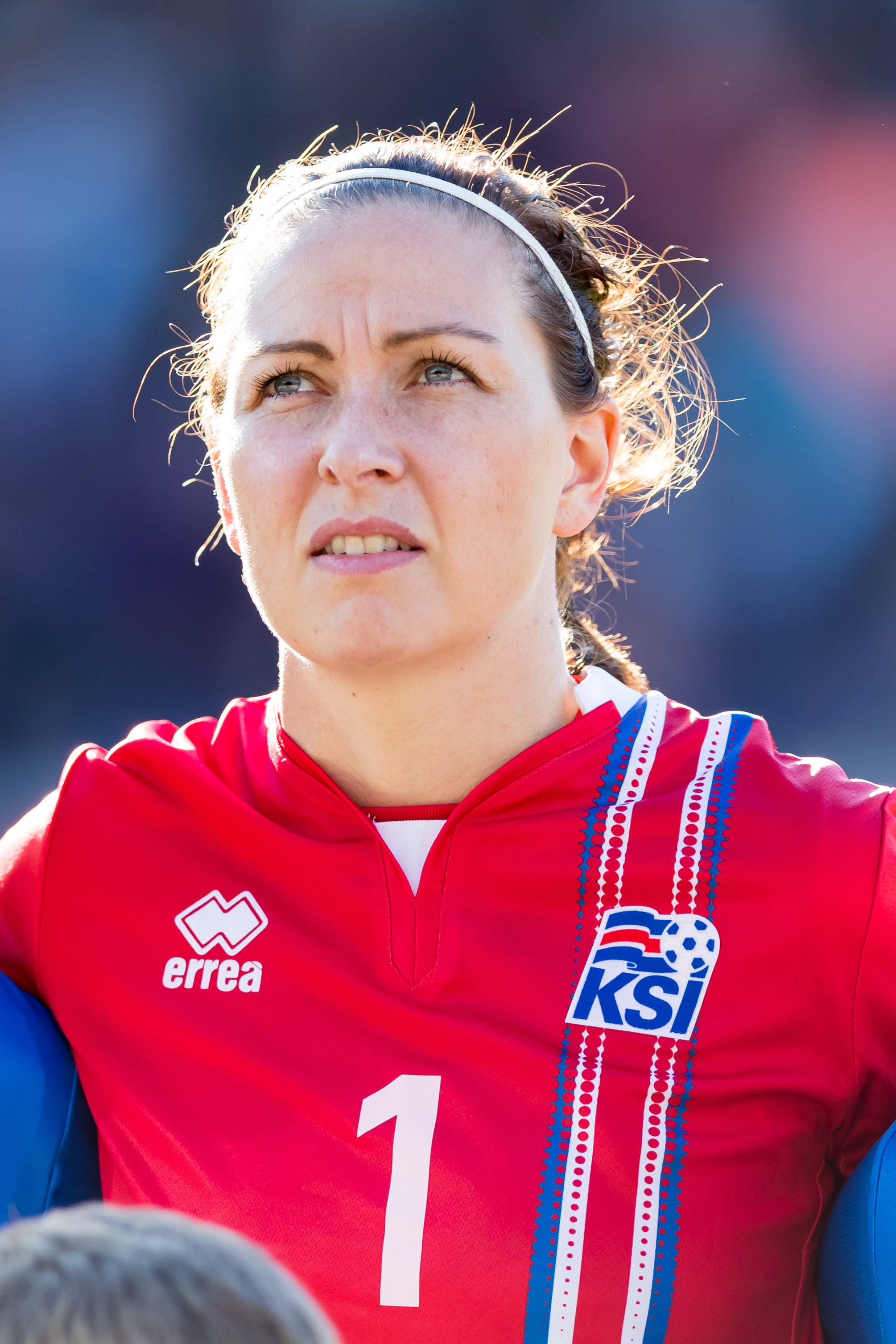
- Guðbjörg in October 2017.

Personal information
- Full name: Guðbjörg Gunnarsdóttir
- Date of birth: 18 May 1985 (age 41)
- Place of birth: Sandgerði, Iceland
- Height: 1.78 m (5 ft 10 in)
- Position: Goalkeeper

Senior career*
Years	Team	Apps	(Gls)
1999–2002	FH	23	(0)
2002–2008	Valur	71	(0)
2009–2012	Djurgårdens IF	81	(0)
2013	Avaldsnes IL	21	(0)
2014	Turbine Potsdam	4	(0)
2014–2015	LSK Kvinner	20	(0)
2016–2020	Djurgårdens IF	71	(0)
2021	Arna-Bjørnar	2	(0)
2022	Eskilstuna United	0	(0)

International career^{‡}
2000–2002	Iceland U-17	12	(0)
2001–2004	Iceland U-19	14	(0)
2003–2006	Iceland U-21	11	(0)
2004–2018	Iceland	64	(0)
- * Club domestic league appearances and goals as of 6 January 2021 ‡ National team caps and goals as of 6 January 2021

Guðbjörg "Gugga" Gunnarsdóttir (born 18 May 1985) is an Icelandic footballer who played as a goalkeeper for Swedish Damallsvenskan club Eskilstuna United and Iceland's national team. She represented her country in the 2009 and 2013 editions of the UEFA Women's Championship. At club level Guðbjörg has previously represented LSK Kvinner FK and Avaldsnes IL of the Norwegian Toppserien, Turbine Potsdam of the German Frauen-Bundesliga and FH and Valur of the Icelandic Úrvalsdeild.

== Club career ==
Beginning her club career with FH, Guðbjörg made 23 Úrvalsdeild appearances before signing for Valur in summer 2002. At Valur she overcame a series of injuries to claim four Úrvalsdeild winner's medals and one Icelandic Women's Cup winner's medal. She moved to Swedish Damallsvenskan club Djurgårdens IF Dam ahead of the 2009 season.

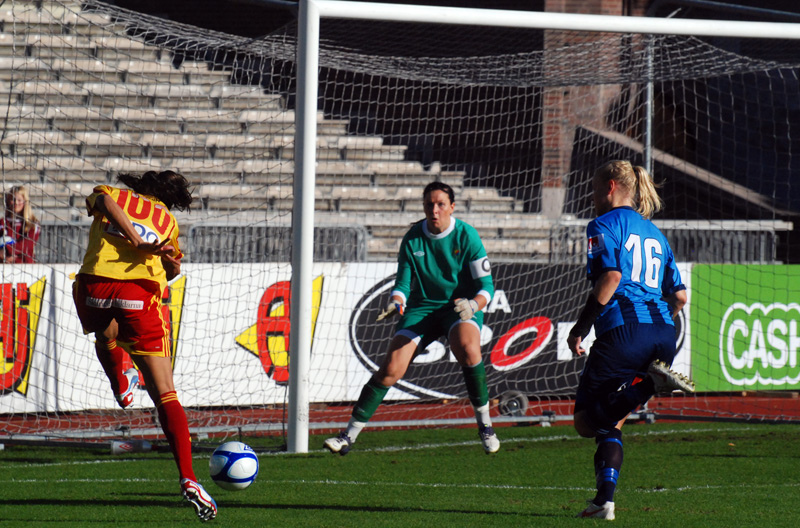
Guðbjörg (centre) playing for Djurgården in October 2012

Guðbjörg developed an affinity for Djurgården and was proud to captain the club. But several other players left due to economic downsizing and when the club was relegated in 2012 she had to leave to protect her national team place.

In early 2013 Guðbjörg moved to Norway to play for wealthy Toppserien newcomers Avaldsnes IL. She also had offers from clubs in Sweden, Germany and Russia.

After one season in Norway, Guðbjörg announced a move to the German club Turbine Potsdam in December 2013. She signed a contract to run for one and a half seasons from 1 January 2014, telling UEFA.com: "If one of the best teams in the world makes you an offer, you cannot say no."

Unable to dislodge Ann-Katrin Berger from the starting goalkeeper position at Turbine, Guðbjörg moved back to Norway with LSK Kvinner FK in July 2014. There she would compete with Nora Neset Gjøen for a place in the team.

In November 2015 Guðbjörg won the Norwegian Women's Cup, playing in LSK's 3–2 final win over her former club Avaldsnes. The following month she announced that she had left LSK and returned to Djurgården, who had been promoted back into the Damallsvenskan for the following season. Declaring "it feels great to be back", Guðbjörg looked forward to challenging Susanne Nilsson for a place in the team. She missed most of the 2019 and 2020 seasons due to the birth of her twins.

In January 2021, Guðbjörg signed with Norwegian Toppserien club Arna-Bjørnar.

== International career ==
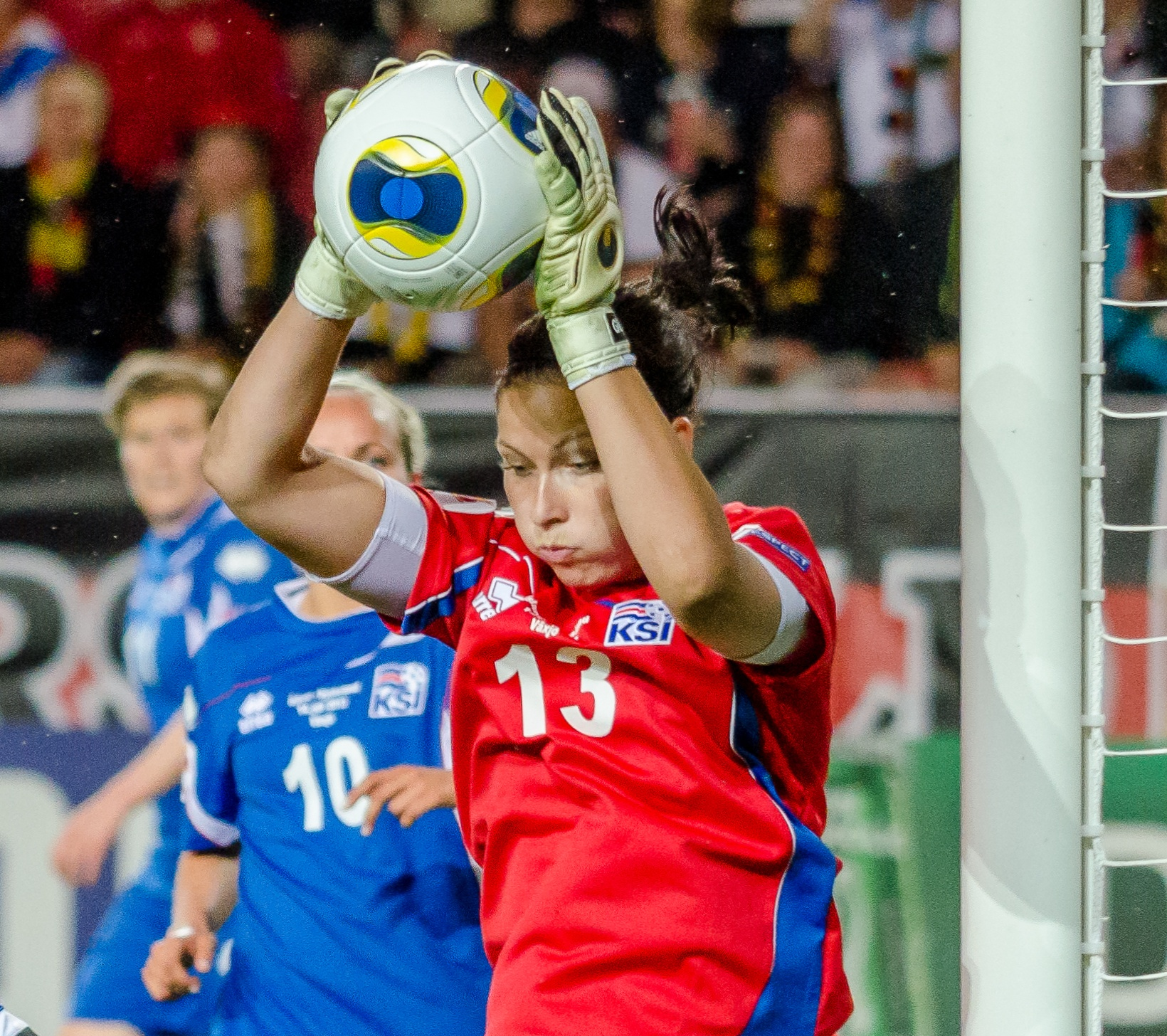
Playing a Group stage game against Germany in the UEFA Women's Euro 2013 at Myresjöhus Arena in Växjö.

Guðbjörg made her senior international debut for Iceland in a 5–1 friendly win over Scotland at the Egilshöll Arena in March 2004.

At UEFA Women's Euro 2009, Guðbjörg played in one match as Iceland were eliminated in the first round.

National team coach Siggi Eyjólfsson selected Guðbjörg in the Iceland squad for UEFA Women's Euro 2013, while rival goalkeeper Þóra Björg Helgadóttir was recovering from a hamstring injury. Guðbjörg took the goalkeeping position at the final tournament, playing in all three group matches and the 4–0 quarter-final defeat to hosts Sweden. The Swedish press hailed her as one of the best players at the competition.

== Honours ==
- Valur:
- Úrvalsdeild: 2004, 2006, 2007, 2008
- Icelandic Women's Cup: 2003, 2006
- LSK Kvinner:
- Toppserien: 2014, 2015
- Norwegian Women's Cup: 2015, 2014
