= Ifeoma Dieke =

Scottish footballer (born 1981)

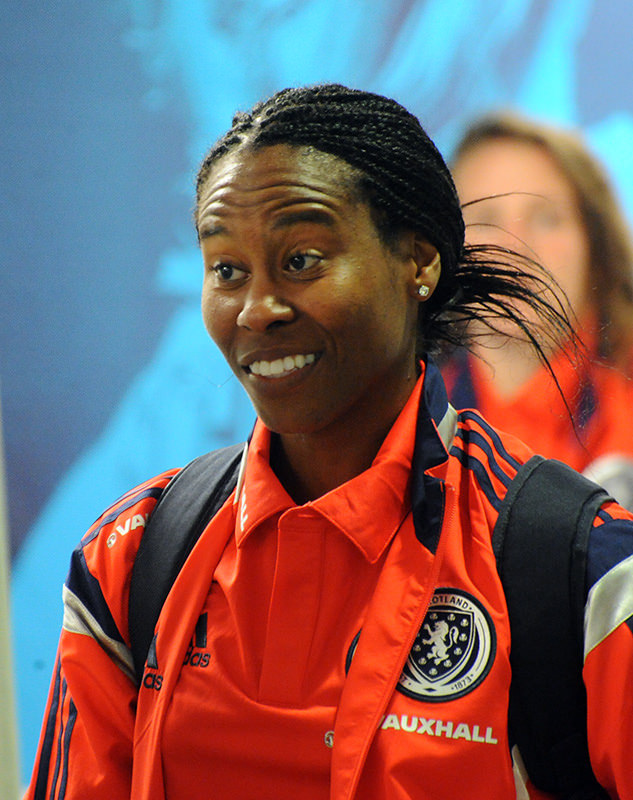
- Dieke with Scotland in September 2014

Personal information
- Full name: Ifeoma Nnenna Dieke
- Date of birth: 25 February 1981 (age 45)
- Place of birth: Amherst, Massachusetts, U.S.
- Height: 5 ft 5 in (1.65 m)
- Position: Defender

College career
Years	Team	Apps	(Gls)
1999–2002	FIU Golden Panthers		

Senior career*
Years	Team	Apps	(Gls)
2003	Atlanta Beat	13	(1)
2007	QBIK		
2008	Kristianstads DFF	18	(0)
2009–2010	Chicago Red Stars	19	(0)
2010–2011	Boston Breakers	22	(1)
2011	→ Apollon Limassol (loan)		
2012–2017	Vittsjö GIK	94	(0)
2018	IFK Kalmar	14	(0)
2018–2019	Apollon Limassol	9	(0)

International career^{‡}
2004–2017	Scotland	123	(0)
2012	Great Britain	3	(0)
- * Club domestic league appearances and goals as of 23:21, 12 December 2018 (UTC) ‡ National team caps and goals as of 23:21, 12 December 2018 (UTC)

Ifeoma Nnenna Dieke (born 25 February 1981) is an American-born Scottish international footballer who played as a defender for several professional clubs in Sweden, the United States, and Cyprus. Between 2004 and 2017, she won 123 caps for the Scotland women's national football team. Dieke was born in Amherst, Massachusetts, to Nigerian parents, moving to Cumbernauld in Scotland when she was three years old. Dieke was the first black woman to captain for Scotland, and Dieke and fellow Scot Kim Little were the only non-English players selected in the Great Britain squad for the 2012 London Olympics.

== Playing career ==
=== Club ===
Dieke started her football career when she was eight years old, playing for her primary school St Mary's. She later joined Cumbernauld Cosmos, from where she moved to Cumbernauld Ladies. In 1999, she was awarded a scholarship by Florida International University, playing for the university's FIU Golden Panthers women's soccer team. She graduated in 2003 and joined Women's United Soccer Association side Atlanta Beat. She started eight of 13 regular season games and scored one goal. The league folded at the end of her first season, and Dieke later played in Sweden (for QBIK in 2007 and for Kristianstads DFF in 2008) and Cyprus.

In 2009, she joined the Chicago Red Stars. In the inaugural 2009 Women's Professional Soccer season, Dieke appeared in 14 games. She was sent off for fouling Kelley O'Hara during the Red Stars' 2–0 defeat to FC Gold Pride in May 2010. The following month she was allowed to move to the Boston Breakers on a free transfer. She started 12 of her 13 appearances for the Breakers in 2010, scoring one goal against her former employers Chicago, for whom she had made five early season appearances.

During the WPS offseason in 2011, Dieke joined Cypriot club Apollon Limassol on loan from the Breakers. The WPS folded ahead of the 2012 season and Dieke returned to Sweden, signing for Damallsvenskan newcomers Vittsjö GIK. Despite missing almost the entire 2013 Damallsvenskan season through injury, Dieke was given a new contract by Vittsjö ahead of 2014.

In January 2018, Dieke left Vittsjö after six seasons. In search of a new challenge, she joined newly promoted Damallsvenkan club IFK Kalmar. The move was not successful and with Kalmar adrift at the foot of the league table, Dieke was dropped from the team and released during the mid-season break. It was reported that she was unhappy at Kalmar's failure to strengthen their playing squad. She returned to Apollon in September 2018.

=== International ===
Dieke was eligible to represent either Scotland, the United States or Nigeria at international level. She made her Scotland debut in January 2004 against Greece and earned her 50th cap against Northern Ireland in May 2009.

In October 2008 she scored an own goal in a UEFA Women's Euro 2009 qualifying play-off against Russia in Nalchik. The tie finished 4–4 and Scotland were eliminated on the away goals rule, much to Dieke's disappointment: "It hit off my shin, and for me that was the one that knocked us out because it was an away goal. I was beating myself up quite a bit for that."

In 2012 Dieke was selected for a place in the Great Britain team at the 2012 London Olympics. Along with Scotland teammate Kim Little, Dieke was one of only two non-English players in the squad. She played alongside Casey Stoney in central defence, but suffered knee ligament damage in the second group match and had to withdraw from the squad. Medical tests showed that she had ruptured an anterior cruciate ligament, which prevented her from playing in the remainder of Scotland's UEFA Women's Euro 2013 qualifying matches.

After missing almost two years of international football due to the injury, Dieke was recalled to Scotland's squad for the 2014 Cyprus Women's Cup. That October she won her 100th cap in Scotland's 2–0 2015 FIFA Women's World Cup qualification – UEFA play-offs defeat by the Netherlands in Rotterdam.

Dieke remained in Scotland's team for UEFA Women's Euro 2017 qualifying. With teammate Jo Love, she was awarded a special cap in October 2015 as part of a UEFA-backed programme to honour players with 100 or more appearances for their national teams.

When Scotland secured qualification for their first ever major tournament at UEFA Women's Euro 2017, after several near misses, 36-year-old veteran Dieke announced that she would be retiring from international football afterwards. She played in all three games as Scotland made a limp group stage exit, then confirmed her decision to retire the following month.

== Coaching career ==
Dieke began coaching youth club soccer in the United States from 2000 to 2007. She was named varsity coach for Palmer Trinity School in 2019.

Dieke was a coach at Elite Clubs National League (ECNL) youth club FC Prime of Sunrise, Florida, from 2020 to 2022. In a Washington Post report published in November 2022, Dieke alleged that she had experienced sexist behavior from club staff and match officials, and suggested that the ECNL's exclusion of women from leadership roles was "a systemic problem". She derisively compared her tenure to Nigerian politics, which she experienced through her mother's campaigning for office in Nigeria. The ECNL and several of the clubs named in the report responded by denying the allegations or dismissing the complaints, and the league's chief operating officer Jennifer Winnagle stated that more than half of the league's front office staff was female.

On April 15, 2022, Dieke was named Miami-Dade County girls' soccer coach of the year for classes 4A-2A, recognizing her work managing the Palmer Trinity School Falcons to the county's only regional playoff wins in its classification.

In May 2022, United States Youth Soccer Association club Miami Rush Kendall SC announced Dieke as a U19 girls coach.

== Playing style ==
Team GB coach Hope Powell said of Dieke: "Ife's a great defender one-v-one. She probably prefers a centre-half role but can play anywhere along the back." Writing in The Herald in 2017, sports journalist Alan Campbell described Dieke as: "[a] quick and tactically astute central defender".

== Personal life ==
Dieke is often referred to by the hypocorism "Ife" (or "Iffy"). She can speak the Igbo language.
