= Susanne Nilsson =

Serbian-Swedish footballer (born 1991)

Susanne Åberg
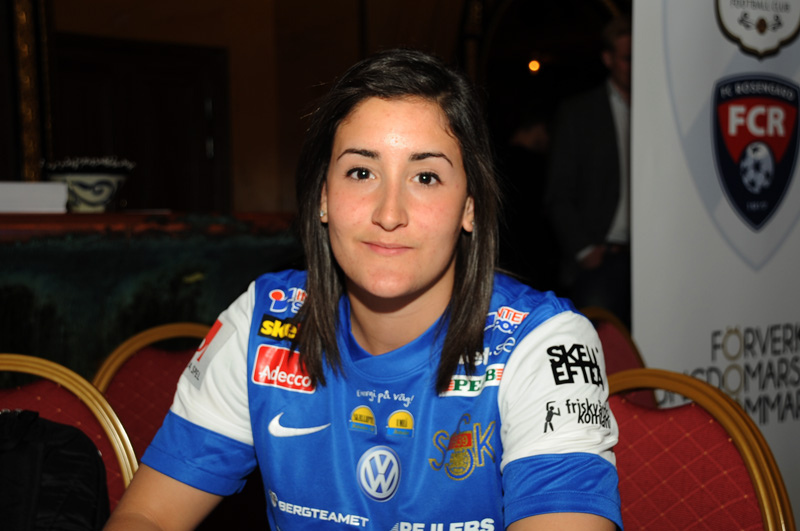

Personal information
- Date of birth: 30 December 1991 (age 34)
- Place of birth: Sweden
- Height: 1.70 m (5 ft 7 in)
- Position: Goalkeeper

Youth career
- Kristianstads DFF

Senior career*
Years	Team	Apps	(Gls)
2007–2008	Byttorps IF		
2009–2011	Göteborg	2	(0)
2011	→ Hovås Billdal IF (loan)	14	(0)
2012	AIK	21	(0)
2013–2014	Sunnanå SK	37	(0)
2014–2016	Djurgårdens IF	25	(0)
2016–2019	Morön BK	73	(0)

International career^{‡}
2007	Sweden U17	4	(0)
2007–2010	Sweden U19	15	(0)
2011–2012	Sweden U23	3	(0)
2014–2016	Serbia	12	(0)
- * Club domestic league appearances and goals as of 7 September 2016 ‡ National team caps and goals as of 7 September 2016

Susanne "Sussie" Åberg (née Nilsson; Serbian: Сузaнa Нилсoн, romanized: Suzana Nilson; born 30 December 1991) is a former football goalkeeper who most recently played for Morön BK. She previously played for Djurgårdens IF, Sunnanå SK, AIK and Göteborg FC. After playing for the country of her birth Sweden at youth level, Åberg represented Serbia at senior international level.

== Club career ==
Åberg signed for Göteborg FC in 2009 from Byttorps IF. She found her path to the first team blocked, first by Hedvig Lindahl, and then by Kristin Hammarström. She spent part of the 2011 season on loan to Hovås Billdal IF, then signed for AIK ahead of the 2012 season.

In 2012, Åberg was being evaluated by scouts from Turbine Potsdam and other foreign clubs. Her contract with AIK contained a relegation release clause. When AIK were relegated, Åberg signed a one-year contract with Damallsvenskan newcomers Sunnanå SK. Åberg played with Sunnanå SK during the 2013 and 2014 seasons and made a total of 37 league appearances.

For the 2015 season, Åberg joined Djurgårdens IF. She played an important role in securing Djurgårdens' return to the Damallsvenskan, but subsequently lost her place in the team to Guðbjörg Gunnarsdóttir. During the mid-season break in the 2016 Damallsvenskan, Åberg quit Djurgårdens because she wanted to move back to Skellefteå.

Instead of going back to Sunnanå, Åberg joined Morön BK. The modest club competed in Division 1, the regionalised third tier of Swedish women's football. They declared their surprise and delight at signing a goalkeeper of Åberg's standing. In October 2018 Åberg helped a youthful Morön team win promotion to the Elitettan. She announced her retirement from professional football in November 2019.

== International career ==
As a Swedish under-19 international, she took part as a reserve in the 2009 U-19 European Championship and the 2010 U-20 World Cup. She made a total of 15 appearances for the U19 team and three for the U17 team.

Despite being capped by Sweden up to under-23 level, Åberg was also eligible to play for Serbia. In January 2013, she was considering an offer from the Serbs to attend their national team training camp ahead of the 2015 FIFA Women's World Cup qualification tournament. She accepted a call-up from Serbia and joined the team for a match against Malta in February 2014.
