= Alexandra Benediktsson =

Swedish footballer

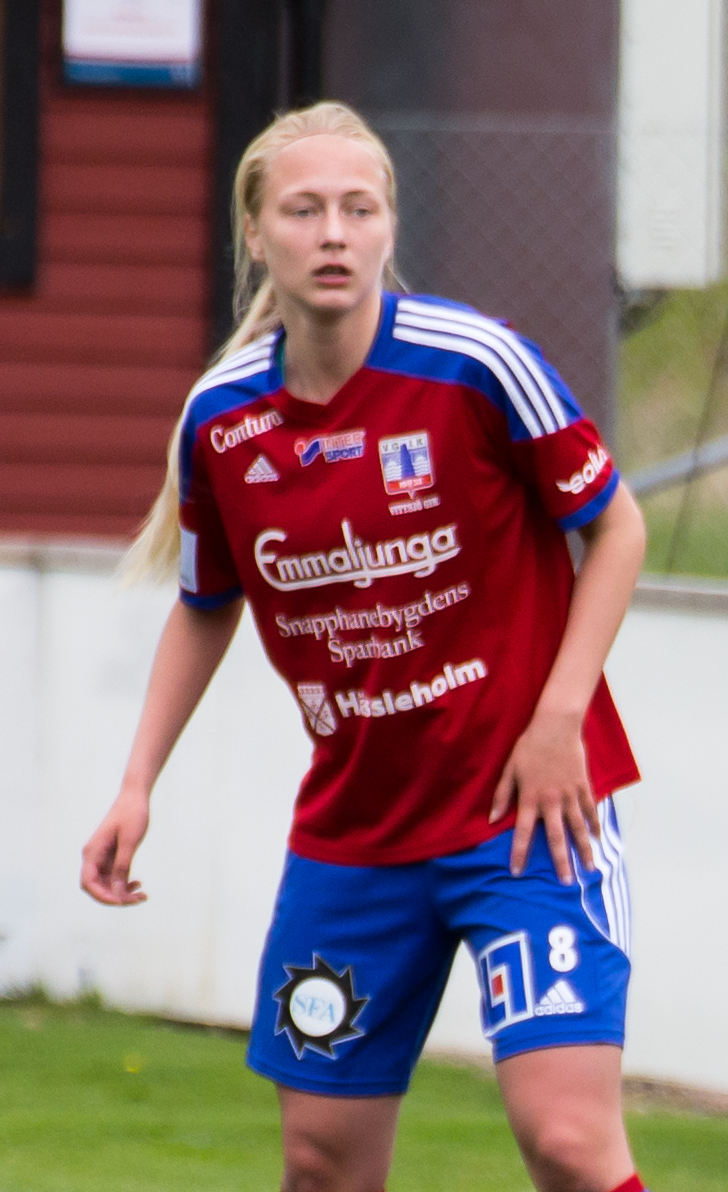

Personal information
- Full name: Linnéa Alexandra Charlotte Benediktsson
- Date of birth: 22 October 1994 (age 32)
- Place of birth: Malmö, Sweden
- Position: Defender

Team information
- Current team: Vittsjö GIK
- Number: 8

Senior career*
| Years | Team | Apps | (Gls) |
| 2012–2014 | IF Limhamn Bunkeflo | 62 | (3) |
| 2015–2021 | Vittsjö GIK | 59 | (3) |
| 2022 | Piteå IF | 12 | (0) |
| 2023–2025 | Eskilstuna United DFF | 5 | (0) |

International career^{‡}
| 2011 | Sweden U17 | 1 | (0) |
| 2012–2013 | Sweden U19 | 8 | (1) |
- * Club domestic league appearances and goals as of 09:30, 26 May 2023 (UTC) ‡ National team caps and goals as of 21:16, 23 May 2016 (UTC)

Linnéa Alexandra Charlotte Benediktsson (born 22 October 1994) is a Swedish women's footballer who plays as a defender for Vittsjö GIK.
