= Petra Vaelma =

Finnish footballer (born 1982)

Personal information
- Full name: Petra Pauliina Vaelma
- Date of birth: 11 May 1982 (age 44)
- Place of birth: Turku, Finland
- Height: 1.71 m (5 ft 7 in)
- Position: Defender

Senior career*
Years	Team	Apps	(Gls)
- TPS
- Pyrkivä
2001–2006	Pietarsaari		
2006	Bälinge		
2007	Eskilstuna		
2008	Umeå Södra	21	(0)
2009–2013	Klepp		

International career
1999–2011	Finland	93	(0)
- * Club domestic league appearances and goals

Petra Pauliina Vaelma (born 11 May 1982) is a Finnish former football defender who most recently played for Klepp IL of the Norwegian Toppserien. She previously played for United Pietarsaari in the Naisten Liiga, and Bälinge IF and Umeå Södra in the Swedish Damallsvenskan, also playing in the UEFA Women's Champions League with United Pietarsaari.

Since 1998 she was a member of the Finnish national team, playing in the 2005 and 2009 editions of the European Championships.

Vaelma retired from football after the 2013 season, but remained in Stavanger to work in a hotel.
