= Michaela Hermansson =

Swedish footballer

Personal information
- Full name: Michaela Hermansson
- Date of birth: 9 February 1990 (age 36)
- Place of birth: Sweden
- Position: Midfielder

Team information
- Current team: Kvarnsvedens IK
- Number: 8

Senior career*
Years	Team	Apps	(Gls)
2011–	Kvarnsvedens IK	142	(16)
- * Club domestic league appearances and goals as of 15 June 2020 (UTC)

Michaela Hermansson (born 9 February 1990) is a Swedish football midfielder who plays for Kvarnsvedens IK.
