= Sarah Elnicky =

American soccer defender

Personal information
- Full name: Sarah Catherine Elnicky
- Date of birth: October 5, 1982 (age 44)
- Place of birth: Rochester, New York, United States
- Position: Defender

Team information
- Current team: Kvarnsvedens IK
- Number: 5

College career
Years	Team	Apps	(Gls)
2001–2004	Syracuse Orange		

Senior career*
Years	Team	Apps	(Gls)
2012–2013	IK Sirius	48	(7)
2014	Medkila IL	22	(1)
2015–	Kvarnsvedens IK	31	(8)
- * Club domestic league appearances and goals as of May 21, 2016

Sarah Catherine Elnicky (born October 5, 1982) is an American former soccer defender who played for IK Sirius, Medkila IL and Kvarnsvedens IK. Elnicky played for the Syracuse Orange women's soccer team representing Syracuse University from 2001 to 2004.
