= Maria Yatrakis =

American-born Greek footballer and manager

Personal information
- Full name: Maria Peter Yatrakis
- Date of birth: 10 June 1980 (age 46)
- Place of birth: Brooklyn, United States
- Position: Goalkeeper

College career
Years	Team	Apps	(Gls)
1999–2002	Connecticut Huskies		

Senior career*
Years	Team	Apps	(Gls)
2006–2007	QBIK		

International career
2004	Greece	29 (?)	(0)

Managerial career
- Columbia Lions (women) (assistant)
- * Club domestic league appearances and goals

Maria Peter Yatrakis (born 10 June 1980), known in Greece as Maria Giatrakis (Greek: Μαρία Γιατράκη), is an American-born Greek football manager and former player, who played as a goalkeeper. She has been a member of the Greece women's national team.

== Early life ==
Yatrakis was born in Brooklyn Heights to Greek immigrant parents.

== College career ==
Yatrakis attended the University of Connecticut in Storrs, Connecticut.

== Club career ==
After college, Yatrakis tried out for the Women's United Soccer Association but was cut. In 2006, she joined Swedish Damallsvenskan club QBIK.

== International career ==
With the Athens Olympics approaching, Yatrakis applied for Greek citizenship in 2002, and joined the Greek national team that same year. She was one of several American-born Greek players on the team. She played for the Greece women's national football team at the 2004 Summer Olympics.

== Managerial career ==
Yatrakis worked as an assistant coach for the Columbia University Lions.

== See also ==
- Greece at the 2004 Summer Olympics
