= Rachel Mercik =

American association football player

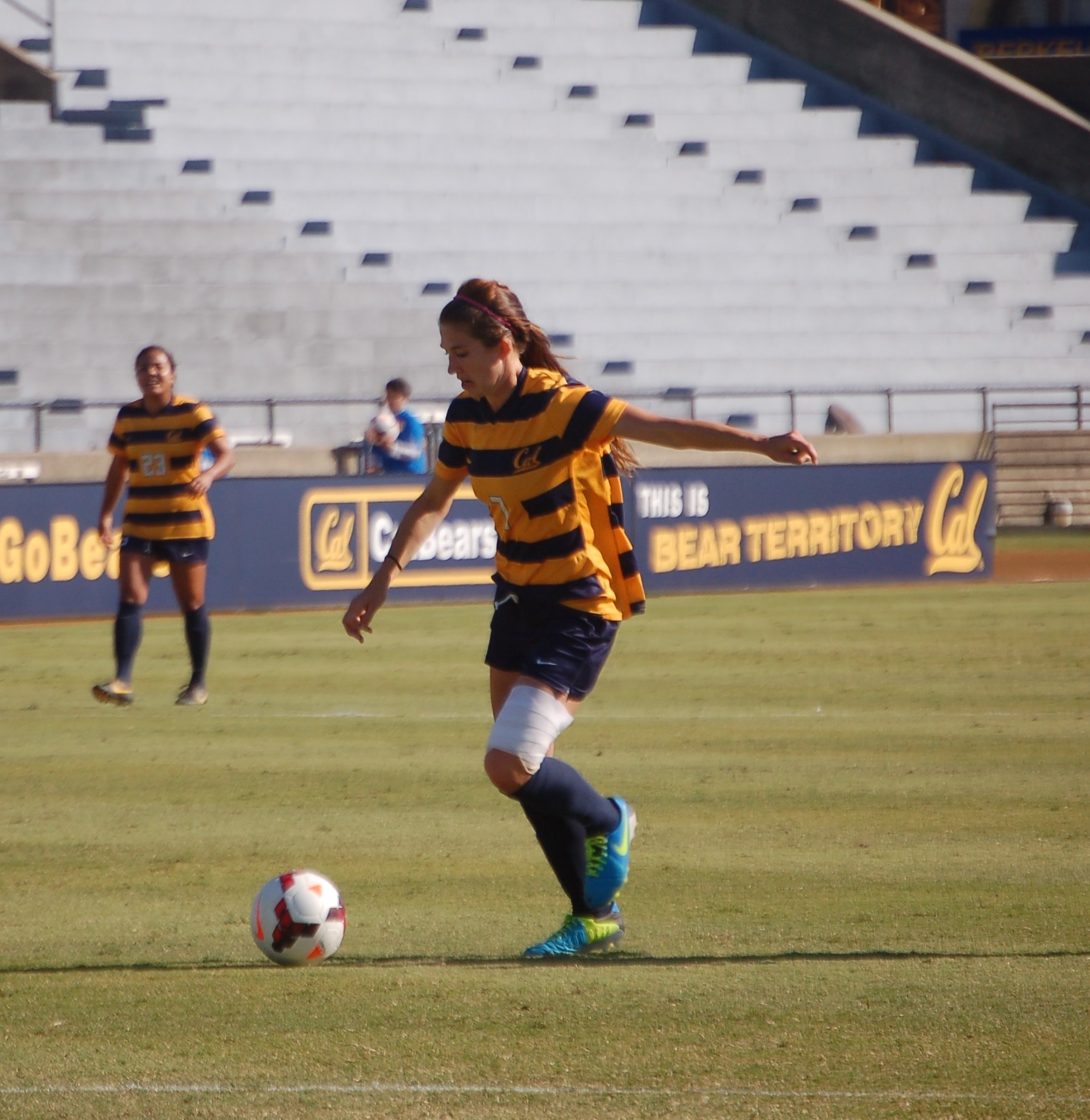
- Rachel Mercik

Personal information
- Full name: Rachel Lynne Mercik
- Date of birth: December 16, 1991 (age 34)
- Place of birth: Mountain View, California, United States
- Height: 5 ft 8 in (1.73 m)
- Positions: Midfielder; forward

Team information
- Current team: Apollon Ladies F.C.
- Number: 27

Youth career
- Sacramento Storm

College career
Years	Team	Apps	(Gls)
2010–2013	California Golden Bears		

Senior career*
Years	Team	Apps	(Gls)
2013	Seattle Sounders Women	10	(0)
2014	Bay Area Breeze	10	
2014–2015	1. FFC Turbine Potsdam	9	(0)
2016–2018	Vittsjö GIK	40	
2018–	Apollon Ladies F.C.		

International career
2007	United States U-17		
2011	U-20 National Team Pool		
2014	United States U-23		
- * Club domestic league appearances and goals as of January 12, 2018

Rachel Lynne Mercik (born December 16, 1991) is an American professional soccer player who currently plays for Apollon Ladies F.C. in the Cypriot First Division (women). She previously played in the German Frauen-Bundesliga with 1. FFC Turbine Potsdam and the Swedish Damallsvenskan for Vittsjö GIK. Mercik has represented the United States on the under-16, under-17, under-20 and under-23 national soccer teams.

== Early life ==
Raised in El Dorado Hills, California, Mercik attended Oak Ridge High School where she captained the varsity soccer team in 2009. She led the team in goals and assists and led her team to the 2009 Sac-Joaquin Section Division II championship and was subsequently named to the all-league first-team. As a senior in 2010, Mercik was ranked as the No. 18 player in the nation, according to the Top Drawer Soccer National Top-100 List, and earned a 2009 ESPN Spring All-America team honorable mention.

Mercik played club soccer for the CASA Boca Juniors as well as the MVLA Soccer club under coach Albertin Montoya.

=== University of California, Berkeley, 2010–2013 ===
As a freshman in 2010, Mercik played in 12 of Cal's 20 games, starting four. She scored two goals and two assists. During her sophomore year, Mercik played in 20 of Cal's 22 games, starting 9, and added four goals and two assists. As a junior, Mercik played in every game for the Bears, starting 17 times, scored one goal and served four assists. During her senior year, Mercik captained the team and started in all 21 games. She ranked second on the team for goals (6) and assists (4) and scored a golden goal against Cal's longtime rivals Stanford to help the Bears with their first win over Stanford in 7 years. Her collegiate accolades include Pac-12 Offensive Player of the Week, All-Pac-12 Honorable Mention, and Cal Women' Soccer team Offensive MVP of the 2013/2014 season.

== Playing career ==
=== Club ===
==== 1. FFC Turbine Potsdam, 2014–15 ====
Mercik joined German Frauen-Bundesliga club 1. FFC Turbine Potsdam in September 2014. The team reached the DFB-Pokal (women) final, losing to Wolfsburg 3–0.

==== Vittsjö GIK, 2016–2018 ====
Mercik signed with Vittsjö GIK on December 3, 2015, for the 2016 Damallsvenskan season, playing her first 90 minutes against IFK Kalmar in the Svenska Cupen (women) on February 18, 2016.

==== Apollon Ladies F.C., 2018–present ====
In January 2018, Mercik signed with Apollon Ladies F.C.

== International ==
Mercik represented the United States on the under-17 national soccer teal in 2007 during three-game friendly series in Argentina. She has also played for the under-16, under-17, under-20 and under-23 national soccer teams.
