= Lovisa Lennartsson =

Swedish footballer

Personal information
- Full name: Lovisa Lennartsson
- Date of birth: January 10, 1998 (age 28)
- Place of birth: Sweden
- Position: Midfielder

Team information
- Current team: Kvarnsvedens IK
- Number: 12

Senior career*
Years	Team	Apps	(Gls)
2013–	Kvarnsvedens IK	77	(9)
- * Club domestic league appearances and goals as of 01:10, 15 June 2020 (UTC)

Lovisa Lennartsson (born 10 January 1998) is a Swedish football midfielder who plays for Kvarnsvedens IK.
