= Agnes Dahlström =

Swedish footballer

Personal information
- Full name: Agnes Dahlström
- Date of birth: 28 November 1991 (age 34)
- Place of birth: Sweden
- Position: Defender

Team information
- Current team: [IK BRAGE]]
- Number: 7

Senior career*
Years	Team	Apps	(Gls)
2015	Korsnäs IF FK		
2015–	Kvarnsvedens IK	117	(19)
- * Club domestic league appearances and goals as of 15 June 2020 (UTC)

Agnes Dahlström (born 28 November 1991) is a Swedish football defender who plays for Kvarnsvedens IK.
