= Falköpings KIK =

Swedish sports club

- Full name: Falköpings Kvinnliga Idrottsklubb
- Founded: 1976; 49 years ago
- Ground: Odenplan, Falköping
- Website: falkopingskik.se
Home colours	Away colours

Falköpings Kvinnliga Idrottsklubb, commonly known as Falköpings KIK, is a women's sports club in Falköping, Sweden, founded in 1976. The football team had advanced to the Swedish top division, Damallsvenskan in the 2007 season and started by winning their first three matches. In the end, they finished eleventh and were relegated to the following season.

The team plays in red shirt with white details, red shorts and red socks at home, and an all black away kit.
