= 1999 Damallsvenskan =

Swedish women's association football season

The 1999 Damallsvenskan was the twelfth season of the Damallsvenskan. Matches were played between 14 April and 29 October 1999. Älvsjö AIK won the title for the fifth time, a record that stood until the end of 2013. They won by eleven points from Umeå IK. Malmö FF finished third. The playoffs were also won by Älvsjö, beating Malmö FF in the final, who therefore finished as runners-up. This was the last time that playoffs were used.

Before the season, Ornäs BK, Tyresö FF and Östers IF were promoted. The first two teams and Sunnanå SK were relegated at the end of the season.

== Table ==
Pos	Team	Pld	W	D	L	GF	GA	GD	Pts	Qualification or relegation
1	Älvsjö AIK (C, Q)	22	19	2	1	78	13	+65	59	Qualified for playoffs
2	Umeå IK (Q)	22	15	3	4	49	22	+27	48	Qualified for playoffs
3	Malmö FF (Q)	22	13	5	4	71	25	+46	44	Qualified for playoffs
4	Djurgården (Q)	22	14	1	7	58	27	+31	43	Qualified for playoffs
5	Bälinge IF	22	10	4	8	42	45	−3	34	
6	Landvetter IF	22	9	4	9	44	38	+6	31	
7	Hammarby	22	9	3	10	44	47	−3	30	
8	Kristianstad/Wä DFF	22	8	3	11	33	56	−23	27	
9	Östers IF	22	5	7	10	31	48	−17	22	
10	Sunnanå SK (R)	22	3	6	13	29	54	−25	15	Relegated
11	Ornäs BK (R)	22	3	3	16	32	78	−46	12	Relegated
12	Tyresö FF (R)	22	3	1	18	30	88	−58	10	Relegated

Source: RSSSF.com
(C) Champions; (Q) Qualified for the phase indicated; (R) Relegated

== Playoffs ==
=== Semifinals ===
Team 1	Result	Team 2	Match 1	Match 2
Djurgården	1-3	Älvsjö AIK	0-0	1-3
Malmö FF	6-5	Umeå	3-3	3-2

=== Final ===
Team 1	Result	Team 2
Älvsjö AIK	2-0	Malmö FF
