= Ornäs BK =

Swedish football club

- Full name: Ornäs bollklubb
- Sport: soccer
- Founded: 1982
- Based in: Ornäs, Sweden
- Arena: Ornäs IP

Ornäs BK is a soccer club in Ornäs, Sweden, established 1982. The women's team played in the Swedish top division in 1999. The women's soccer section was inactive for a while during the first decade of the 2000s, before being restarted.
