= Caroline Lundberg =

Swedish footballer

Personal information
- Full name: Caroline Lundberg
- Date of birth: March 28, 1990 (age 36)
- Place of birth: Sweden
- Position: Forward

Team information
- Current team: Kvarnsvedens IK
- Number: 10
2011	Djurgårdens IF	9	(0)
2012–2015	IK Sirius	82	(35)
2016–	Kvarnsvedens IK	5	(1)

Caroline Lundberg (born 28 March 1990) is a Swedish football forward who played for Kvarnsvedens IK starting in 2016.
