= Estíbaliz Montes de Oca =

Chilean football player (born 1999)

Personal information
- Full name: Estíbaliz Montes de Oca Muñoz
- Date of birth: 20 February 1999 (age 27)
- Place of birth: Stockholm, Sweden
- Height: 1.66 m (5 ft 5 in)
- Position: Midfielder

Team information
- Current team: Sundsvalls DFF

Senior career*
Years	Team	Apps	(Gls)
2015–2017	AIK	19	(0)
2017–2020	BP	48	(4)
2021	Cesena		
2022–	Sundsvalls DFF	16	(0)

International career
2013	Sweden U15		
2016	Chile U17		
- * Club domestic league appearances and goals

Estíbaliz Montes de Oca Muñoz (born 20 February 1999) is a footballer who plays as a midfielder for Sundsvalls DFF. Born in Sweden, she has been called up to represent Chile internationally.

== Career ==
=== Club career ===
Montes de Oca started her career with Swedish top flight side AIK, where she suffered relegation to the Swedish second tier. In 2017, Montes de Oca signed for BP in the Swedish third tier, helping them earn promotion to the Swedish second tier.

Before the second half of 2020–21, she signed for Italian club Cesena. Before the 2022 season, she signed for Sundsvalls DFF in the Swedish second tier.

=== International career ===
Montes de Oca has represented Sweden at under-15 level in 2013 and Chile at under-17 level in the 2016 South American Championship.

Montes de Oca is eligible to represent Chile internationally through her parents. In October 2021, she was called up to the Chile squad for friendly matches against Colombia, but she didn't make any appearance.

== Personal life ==
She holds dual nationality Swedish-Chilean since her parents are Chilean.
