= Minna Meriluoto =

Finnish footballer (born 1985)

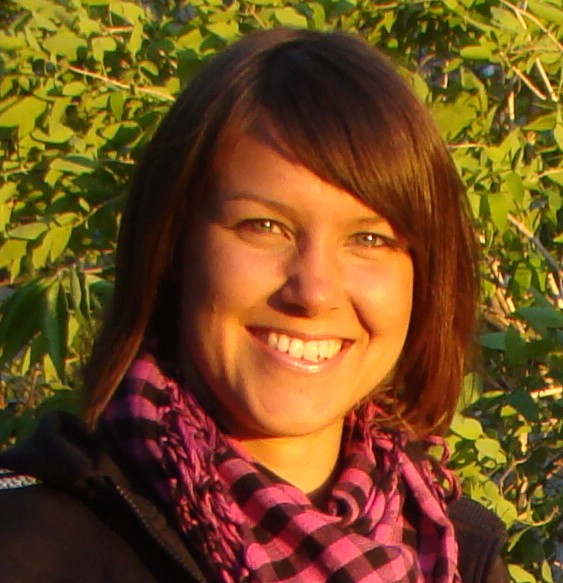

Personal information
- Full name: Minna Johanna Meriluoto
- Date of birth: 4 October 1985 (age 41)
- Place of birth: Turku, Finland
- Height: 1.72 m (5 ft 8 in)
- Position: Goalkeeper

Team information
- Current team: HJK Helsinki
- Number: 1

Youth career
- TuNL
- TuTo
- SCR

Senior career*
Years	Team	Apps	(Gls)
–2006	FC United (Pietarsaari)		
2008	Umeå Södra FF	17	(0)
2009–2011	Hammarby IF	58	(0)
2012–2013	Jitex BK	35	(0)
2014	Vittsjö	15	(0)
2015–	HJK Helsinki	6	(0)

International career^{‡}
2006–	Finland	51	(0)
- * Club domestic league appearances and goals as of 23 May 2015 ‡ National team caps and goals as of 25 August 2014

Minna Johanna Kauppinen (née Meriluoto; born 4 October 1985) is a Finnish international football goalkeeper. At club level she plays in the Naisten Liiga for HJK Helsinki.

== Club career ==
Meriluoto participated in the 2005–06 UEFA Women's Cup with FC United. Ahead of the 2008 season, in November 2007, she moved to Sweden and joined Umeå Södra FF. When her club were relegated at the end of that campaign, Meriluoto remained in the Damallsvenskan in signing for Hammarby IF. In October 2011 Jitex BK announced that she was to play the following season with them.

In December 2013 Meriluoto confirmed her departure from Jitex and signed for Damallsvenskan rivals Vittsjö GIK.

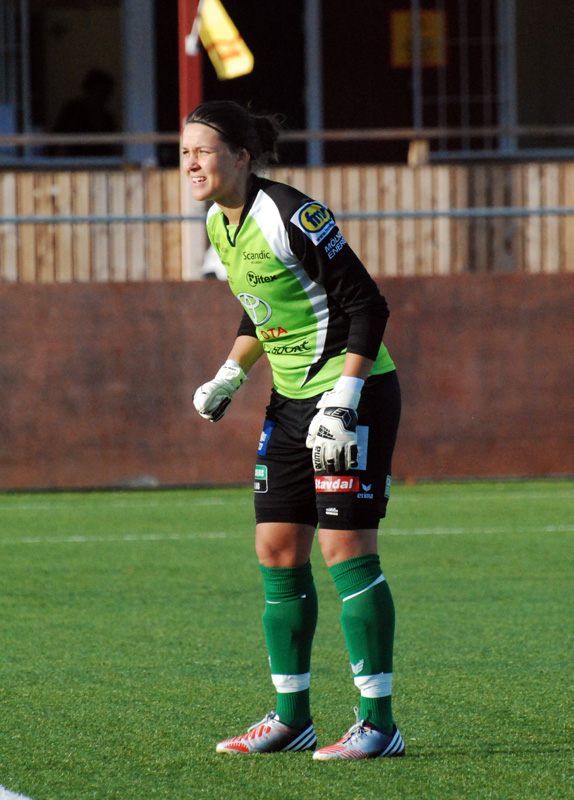
Playing for Jitex in 2012

== International career ==
Meriluoto was hosts Finland's first choice goalkeeper at the 2004 UEFA Women's Under-19 Championship. She had been voted Finland's most promising female player in 2002.

She made her debut for the senior Finland team on 5 February 2006; playing 90 minutes against Netherlands in Spain. Meriluoto also played in one of Finland's matches at UEFA Women's Euro 2009, against Ukraine.

In June 2013 Meriluoto was named in national coach Andrée Jeglertz's Finland squad for UEFA Women's Euro 2013. At the tournament, she took over goalkeeping duties from Tinja-Riikka Korpela for the final group game; a 1–1 draw with Denmark.

== Personal life ==
Meriluoto moved to Sweden with her footballer boyfriend Jesper Törnqvist, who signed for Umeå FC.
