= Anna Welin =

Swedish footballer (born 1994)

Personal information
- Date of birth: 25 March 1994 (age 32)
- Place of birth: Höllviken, Sweden
- Height: 1.73 m (5 ft 8 in)
- Position: Midfielder

Team information
- Current team: Malmö FF
- Number: 28

Senior career*
Years	Team	Apps	(Gls)
2012–2013	FC Rosengård	18	(0)
2014	Vittsjö GIK	18	(0)
2015–2018	IF Limhamn Bunkeflo	94	(36)
2019–2021	Kristianstad	70	(17)
2022–2023	Brøndby IF	20	(1)
2023–	Malmö FF	0	(0)

International career^{‡}
2010–2011	Sweden U-17	5	(0)
2013	Sweden U-19	1	(0)
- * Club domestic league appearances and goals as of 1 August 2023 ‡ National team caps and goals as of 31 January 2014

Anna Welin (born 25 March 1994) is a Swedish professional footballer playing for Malmö FF in Division 1.

== Career ==
She played as a midfielder for Kristianstad in the Damallsvenskan. She previously played for LdB FC Malmö from 2012 to 2013. In July 2023 she signed with Swedish Division 1 club Malmö FF Women.

== Honours ==
=== Club ===
LdB FC Malmö

Winner

- Damallsvenskan: 2013
- Super Cup: 2012

Runner-up

- Damallsvenskan: 2012
