= Patrycja Jerzak =

Polish footballer (born 1998)

Personal information
- Full name: Patrycja Weronika Jerzak
- Date of birth: 13 January 1998 (age 28)
- Place of birth: Rybnik, Poland
- Height: 1.74 m (5 ft 8 1/2 in)
- Position: Midfielder

College career
Years	Team	Apps	(Gls)
2018–2019	UConn Huskies	31	(2)

Senior career*
Years	Team	Apps	(Gls)
2014	Åkers IF	0	(0)
2014–2015	IFK Nyköping	21	(1)
2017	Djurgårdens IF	1	(0)
2018–2019	Telge United FF	8	(2)
2020	Napoli		
2020	Mallbackens IF	9	(0)
2021	Umeå IK	7	(1)
2022	Ifö Bromölla IF	25	(2)
2023–2024	Eskilstuna United DFF	9	(1)

International career
2015–2016	Poland U19	2	(2)
- * Club domestic league appearances and goals as of 29 May 2025

Patrycja Weronika Jerzak (born 13 January 1998) is a Polish footballer who plays as a midfielder.

== Early life ==
Born in 1998 in Poland, Jerzak is nicknamed "Pato". She started playing football at the age of five before moving to Sweden. She trained with her family until reaching the age of twelve, when she joined the youth academy of Stallarholmens SK for a year. She then moved to the academy of IFK Nyköping at the age of fifteen.

== Club career ==
She started her senior career with Swedish side Djurgårdens IF and was regarded as a Polish prospect at the time. During the 2017 season with the club, she made one Damallsvenskan appearance. From 2018 to 2019, Jerzak played for the UConn Huskies in the United States. After that, she signed for Italian second-tier side Napoli, where she experienced lockdown during the COVID-19 pandemic. She helped them earn promotion to the Italian top flight. Before the 2021 season, she signed for Swedish side Umea. Before the 2023 season, she signed for Eskilstuna United DFF, where she suffered an injury.

== International career ==
Jerzak has represented Poland internationally at youth level.

== Style of play ==
Jerzak mainly operates on the right side of the field.

== Personal life ==
Jerzak has a brother. She has created her own magazine, Football is Everywhere.
