= Eskilstuna United DFF =

Swedish football club

- Full name: Eskilstuna United DFF
- Founded: 29 September 2002; 23 years ago
- Ground: Tunavallen, Eskilstuna
- Capacity: 7,800
- Chairman: Karl-Anders Siljebråt
- Coach: Vaila Barsley
- League: Damallsvenskan
- 2025: ▲ Winners, Elitettan
- Website: http://eskilstunaunited.se
Home colours

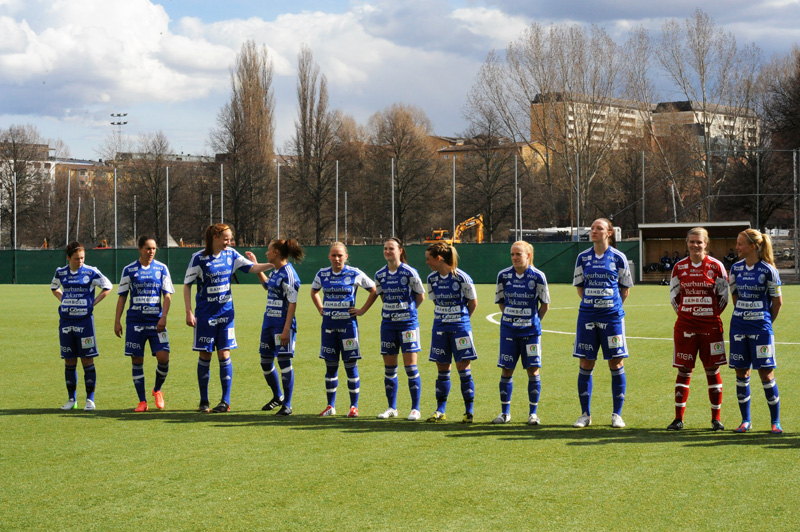
Lining out in April 2013

Eskilstuna United DFF is a football club from Eskilstuna, in Södermanland County, Sweden. The club currently plays in the Damallsvenskan, the top tier of Swedish women's football.

The club was established in 2002. Spending the 2000s and early 2010s in the lower tiers of the football pyramid, the club won promotion from the Elitettan in the 2013 season, playing in the Damallsvenskan for the first time in the 2014 season. After finishing runners-up in the 2015 season, the club qualified for the UEFA Women's Champions League (UWCL) round of 32 for the 2016–17, though were eliminated in the round of 16. The club was relegated to the Elitettan in the 2022 season after they were not given a licence for the 2023 season. After winning the Elitettan in the 2025 season, the club returned to the Damallsvenskan for the 2026 season.

The club play their home games at Tunavallen in Eskilstuna. The team colours are blue and white. The club is affiliated to the Södermanlands Fotbollförbund.

== History ==
Played in the first season (2013) of the newly created second level Elitettan and won the title. In its first top level season (2014 Damallsvenskan) the club finished seventh. In its second top season, they finished as runners-up and qualified to the 2016–17 UEFA Women's Champions League.

Eskilstuna United DFF lost the Swedish Women's Cup final, 0–3, to BK Häcken FF in May 2021.

On 5 December 2022, the Swedish Football Association announced that the club was denied for failing to fulfill economic requirements, and weren't allowed to play the 2023 Damallsvenskan and instead were relegated to Elitettan. The club appealed, but on 2 January 2023, the Swedish Football Association announced that instead, IK Uppsala would be promoted.

== Current squad ==
As of 6 May 2024.

Note: Flags indicate national team as defined under FIFA eligibility rules; some limited exceptions apply. Players may hold more than one non-FIFA nationality.

No.	Pos.	Nation	Player
1	GK	SWE	Julia Langörgen
3	DF	SWE	Matilda Eriholm
4	DF	SWE	Stina Niklasson
6	DF	SCO	Paige McAllister
7	FW	SWE	Astrid Larsson
8	DF	SWE	Alexandra Benediktsson
9	FW	FIN	Kaisa Collin
10	MF	SWE	Maja Alvin
11	MF	ESP	Rosita (captain)
12	GK	SWE	Hedvig Lindahl
13	DF	SWE	Elisabeth Tillenius
14	FW	USA	Nicole Robertson
15	MF	SWE	Emma Bülow

No.	Pos.	Nation	Player
17	MF	SWE	Chloe Eriksson
18	FW	SWE	Agnes Vigholm
20	GK	SWE	Clara Wiklund (on loan from Linköping)
23	MF	SWE	Fiona Eriksson
24	MF	SWE	Moa Selling
26	MF	SWE	Linda Hallin
85	MF	POL	Patrycja Jerzak
—	DF	SWE	Hanna Waiter
—	MF	SWE	Isa Sweström
—	MF	SWE	Tyra Ingårda
—	MF	SWE	Tiama Youhana
—	DF	FIN	Sara Ikonen
—	MF	FIN	Viivi Ollonqvist
—	DF	FIN	Noora Hämäläinen

=== Former players ===
For details of current and former players, see Category:Eskilstuna United DFF players.

== Honours ==
- Elitettan (Tier 2)
  - Winners: 2013, 2025

== Record in UEFA Women's Champions League ==
All results (away, home and aggregate) list Eskilstuna United's goal tally first.

Competition	Round	Club	Away	Home	Aggregate
2016–2017	Round of 32	(Scotland) Glasgow City	2–1	1–0 ^{a}	3–1
2016–2017	Round of 16	(Germany) Wolfsburg	0–3	1–5 ^{a}	1–8

^{a} First leg.
