= Hovås Billdal IF =

Swedish football club

- Full name: Hovås Billdal Idrottsförening
- Founded: 1943
- Ground: Hovåsvallen, Hovås, Gothenburg
- League: Division 4 Göteborg B
Home colours	Away colours

Hovås Billdal IF is a Swedish football club located in Hovås, Gothenburg.

== Background ==
Hovås Billdal IF currently plays in Division 4 Göteborg B which is the sixth tier of Swedish football. They play their home matches at the Hovåsvallen in Hovås.

The club is affiliated to Göteborgs Fotbollförbund. Hovås IF have competed in the Svenska Cupen on 21 occasions and have played 52 matches in the competition.

== Season to season ==
In their most successful period Hovås IF competed in the following divisions:

Season	Level	Division	Section	Position	Movements
1969	Tier 3	Division 3	Sydvästra Götaland	1st	Promoted
1970	Tier 2	Division 2	Norra Götaland	8th	
1971	Tier 2	Division 2	Norra Götaland	11th	Relegated
1972	Tier 3	Division 3	Sydvästra Götaland	5th	

In recent seasons Hovås Billdal IF have competed in the following divisions:

Season	Level	Division	Section	Position	Movements
2006**	Tier 7	Division 5	Göteborg B	3rd	Promotion Playoffs – Promoted
2007	Tier 6	Division 4	Göteborg B	11th	Relegated
2008	Tier 7	Division 5	Göteborg B	2nd	Promoted
2009	Tier 6	Division 4	Göteborg B	5th	
2010	Tier 6	Division 4	Göteborg B	9th	
2011	Tier 6	Division 4	Göteborg B	4th	

** League restructuring in 2006 resulted in a new division being created at Tier 3 and subsequent divisions dropping a level.
