= Kvarnsvedens IK =

Swedish football club

- Full name: Kvarnsvedens Idrottsklubb
- Short name: KIK
- Ground: Ljungbergsplanen; Borlänge; Sweden
- Capacity: 1,010
- Chairman: Sven-Olov Davidsson
- Coach: Jonas Björkgren
- League: Elitettan
- 2019: 7th
Home colours	Away colours

Kvarnsvedens IK is a Swedish football club located in Borlänge in Dalarna County.

== Background ==
Football was first played in 1907 under the name Kvarnsvedens GOIF and this continued until 1935 when operations were shut down for financial reasons. A new club was started in 1936 called Övermora IS and from 1941 matches were played at Kvarnsvedens IP. The same year the name of the club was changed to Kvarnsvedens BK. However by 1946 the club had closed for financial reasons.

On 25 July 1962 BTK Verdandi application for membership of the Swedish Football Association was approved along with participation in the league system. This was the beginning of what today is Kvarnsvedens Idrottsklubb. BTK Verdandi played their first game against Ulfshyttan på Romme on 6 April 1963 and won 4–2. In 1970 it was decided to change the name of the club from BTK Verdandi to Kvarnsvedens IK.

Since their foundation Kvarnsvedens IK has participated mainly in the middle and lower divisions of the Swedish football league system. Their best achievements have been third tier football over two seasons in Division 2 Norra in 1987 and 1990 followed by one season in Division 2 Södra Norrland / Västra Norrland in 1991. The club currently plays in Division 2 Norra Svealand which is now the fourth tier of Swedish football. They play their home matches at the Ljungbergsplanen in Borlänge.

Kvarnsvedens IK are affiliated to the Dalarnas Fotbollförbund.

== Women's team ==
The club's women's side gained promotion to the top tier Damallsvenskan for the first time in 2015.

=== Current squad ===
As of 21 June 2020.

Note: Flags indicate national team as defined under FIFA eligibility rules; some limited exceptions apply. Players may hold more than one non-FIFA nationality.

No.	Pos.	Nation	Player
3	DF	SWE	Agnes Dahlström
4	DF	SWE	Hannah Claesson
5	DF	SWE	Anna Björklund
7	MF	SWE	Elvira Bergman
8	MF	SWE	Michaela Hermansson
10	MF	SWE	Joanna Snell
12	MF	SWE	Lovisa Lennartsson
—	MF	SWE	Irmeli Jonsson
—	MF	SWE	Emma Lindén
—	DF	SWE	Frida Jacobsson
—	FW	SWE	Hanna Spets

No.	Pos.	Nation	Player
13	DF	SWE	Marie Salander
15	DF	SWE	Lova Ottvall
16	MF	SWE	Filippa Karlberg
20	MF	SWE	Alice Eriksson
23	FW	SWE	Sofia Lagerström
25	GK	SWE	Jenny Wahlén
33	GK	SWE	Julia Langörgen
—	FW	SWE	Alma Nygren
—	MF	SWE	My Cato
—	FW	SWE	Moa Öhman
—	DF	SWE	Klara Folkesson
—	MF	SWE	Linnéa Lindström

== Honours ==
- Elitettan (Tier 2)
  - Winners: 2015
