= IFK Kalmar =

- Founded: 1970
- Ground: Gröndals IP, Kalmar
- Capacity: 12,182
- Head coach: Jens Wedeborg
- League: Division 2
- 2024: Elitettan, 14th (relegated)
- Website: https://ifkkalmar.se/
Home colours

IFK Kalmar is a football club based in Kalmar, Sweden. The team plays (2026) in Division 2, the fourth tier of the Swedish women's football league system. It played in the first tier, Damallsvenskan, in 2018 and 2022–2023.

IFK Kalmar play their home games at Gröndals IP in Kalmar.

== Former players ==
For details of former players, see Category:IFK Kalmar players.
