= QBIK =

- Full name: QBIK Damfotboll
- Founded: 1978; 47 years ago
- Ground: Tingvalla IP, Karlstad
- Capacity: 10,000
- Chairman: Per-Olof Bäckström
- Manager: Per-Johan Karlsson
- League: Elitettan
- 2016: 12th
- Website: http://www.qbik.se/

QBIK is a Swedish football team from Karlstad. In 2005 they achieved promotion to the Damallsvenskan, which is the women's premier division. The team narrowly missed relegation with a 10th place, but was relegated in 2007 having finished in last 12th place. In 2016 they were relegated one more level down. The club was established in 1978.

QBIK play their home games at Tingvalla Stadium in Karlstad.

== Attendances ==
In recent seasons QBIK have had the following average attendances:

| Season | Average attendance | Division / Section | Level |
|---|---|---|---|
| 2005 | 1 386 | Damallsvenskan | Tier 1 |
| 2006 | 736 | Damallsvenskan | Tier 1 |
| 2007 | 657 | Damallsvenskan | Tier 1 |
| 2008 | 191 | Söderettan | Tier 2 |
| 2009 | 166 | Söderettan | Tier 2 |
| 2010 | 223 | Söderettan | Tier 2 |
| 2011 | 212 | Söderettan | Tier 2 |
| 2012 | 250 | Söderettan | Tier 2 |
| 2013 | 176 | Elitettan | Tier 2 |
| 2014 | 226 | Elitettan | Tier 2 |
| 2015 | 128 | Elitettan | Tier 2 |
| 2016 | 136 | Elitettan | Tier 2 |
| 2017 | ? | Div 1 Norra Götaland | Tier 3 |

* Attendances are provided in the Publikliga sections of the Svenska Fotbollförbundet website.
