= Hilda Carlén =

Swedish footballer (born 1991)

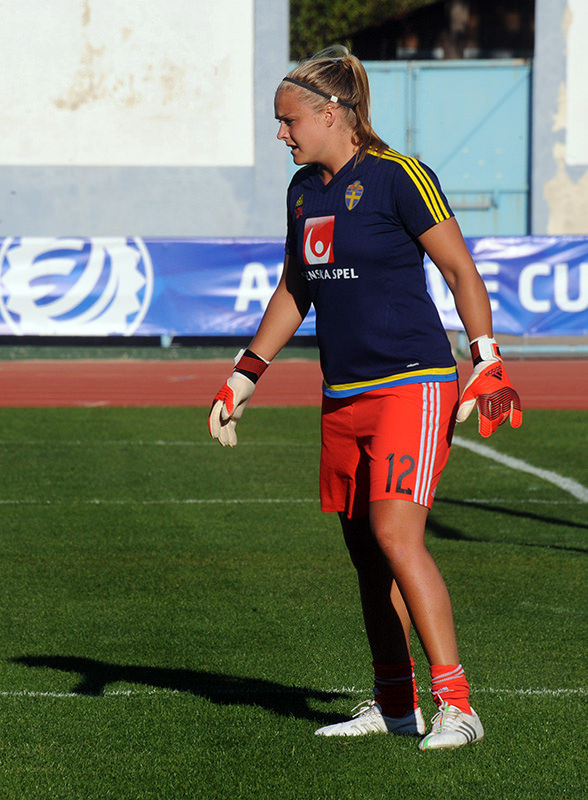
- Carlén training at the 2015 Algarve Cup

Personal information
- Full name: Hilda Maria Carlén
- Date of birth: 13 August 1991 (age 35)
- Place of birth: Ystad, Sweden
- Height: 1.72 m (5 ft 8 in)
- Position: Goalkeeper

Team information
- Current team: Piteå IF
- Number: 1

Youth career
- Öja FF
- Ystads IF FF
- IK Pandora

Senior career*
Years	Team	Apps	(Gls)
2007–2008	Hammenhögs IF		
2009–2012	LdB FC Malmö	0	(0)
2010	→ Linköpings FC (loan)	0	(0)
2013	Hammarby IF	23	(0)
2014–2017	Piteå IF	27	(0)
2018	Linköpings FC	4	(0)
2022	Piteå IF	0	(0)

International career
2015–2018	Sweden	8	(0)
Medal record
Olympic Games
Silver medal – second place	2016 Rio de Janeiro	Team
- * Club domestic league appearances and goals

Hilda Maria Carlén (born 13 August 1991) is a Swedish footballer who plays as a goalkeeper. She has represented Sweden at senior international level.

== Club career ==
After signing for Malmö for the 2009 season, Carlén was understudy to Caroline Jönsson, then Þóra Björg Helgadóttir. She also spent the 2010 season on loan at Damallsvenskan rivals Linköpings FC, where she was back-up to established goalkeeper Sofia Lundgren. Carlén played in Linköpings' 2010–11 UEFA Women's Champions League win over ŽNK Krka, but did not play in the league and was instead sent to get match practice playing for Stattena IF.

Carlén joined Hammarby IF of the Elitettan for the 2013 season, in her quest for first team football. She was back in the Damallsvenskan with Piteå IF for 2014 and made her top level debut on 13 April 2014 in Piteå's 1–0 win over Linköpings.

She made 20 league appearances in her first season with Piteå and was nominated for the "Årets målvakt" (English: Goalkeeper of the Year) award won by Hedvig Lindahl.

== International career ==
Carlén was Sweden's goalkeeper at the 2009 UEFA Women's Under-19 Championship in Belarus and the 2010 FIFA U-20 Women's World Cup in Germany. She made her senior international debut against Finland on 12 February 2015. That month she was also selected in the squad for the 2015 Algarve Cup.

In May 2015, Carlén and Piteå team-mate Emilia Appelqvist were both confirmed in Sweden's squad for the 2015 FIFA Women's World Cup in Canada.

== Personal life ==
Hilda's father is Per Carlén, a team handball coach and former player. Her mother Margareta and brother Oscar also represented Sweden at handball.

== Honours ==
LdB FC Malmö

- Damallsvenskan: 2011
- Svenska Supercupen: 2011, 2012

Linköpings FC

- Svenska Supercupen: 2010

International

- Summer Olympic Games Silver Medal: 2016
- Algarve Cup: 2018
