= Beata Kollmats =

Swedish footballer (born 1992)

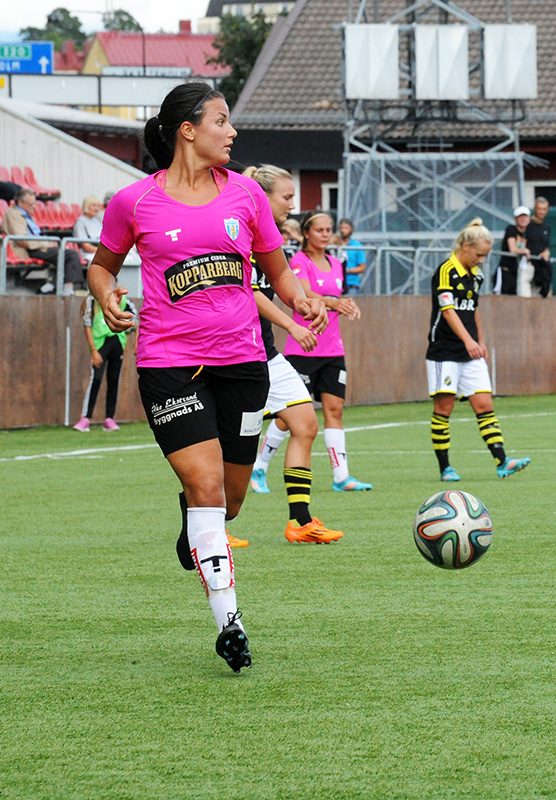

Personal information
- Full name: Beata Kollmats
- Date of birth: 6 July 1992 (age 34)
- Place of birth: Gothenburg, Sweden
- Height: 1.73 m (5 ft 8 in)
- Position: Center back

Team information
- Current team: Djurgården
- Number: 27

Youth career
- IF Böljan

Senior career*
Years	Team	Apps	(Gls)
2008–2010	IF Böljan		
2011–2021	BK Häcken	123	(13)
2021–2023	AS Roma	14	(1)
2023–2024	Djurgården	27	(3)
- * Club domestic league appearances and goals as of 21 February 2025

Beata Kollmats (born 6 July 1992) is a Swedish footballer. Initially a midfielder, she later developed into a center back.

== Club career ==
=== Kopparbergs/Göteborg FC ===
Kollmats started her senior career with IF Böljan in Division 2. In December 2010, at the age of 18, Kollmats signed with Kopparbergs/Göteborg FC in the Damallsvenskan, the top division of women's soccer in Sweden. She started for the club during her single season appearance during a match against Piteå IF in which Göteborg won 6–0. Göteborg won the Swedish Cup the same year.

During the 2012 season, Kollmats made 5 starts in 11 appearances for Göteborg playing a total of 496 minutes. Göteborg was runner-up for the Swedish Super Cup 2012 losing 2–1 to LdB FC Malmö. In April 2013, Göteborg defeated 2012 Damallsvenskan champions, Tyresö FF to clinch the Swedish Supercup. Kollmats returned to the Göteborg squad for the 2013 season. In August of that year, Kollmats suffered a cracked rib after colliding with goalkeeper Kristin Hammarström.

Kollmats was appointed Göteborg captain in April 2018, succeeding Elin Rubensson. In September 2018 Kollmats endured a difficult game against Hammarby, scoring two own-goals in Göteborg's 2–1 defeat and then being carried off with concussion.

On January 28, 2021, Kopparbergs/Göteborg FC became the women's team of BK Häcken.

=== AS Roma ===
On 15 January 2022, Kollmats joined AS Roma and signed a contract until June 2023.

=== Djurgården ===
Kollmats returned to Sweden to play with Djurgården in July 2023 after one and a half year in Roma. In January 2025, she paused her football career as she was expecting a child. Until then, she had made 27 league appearances for the club and scored three goals during one and a half season.

== Honours ==
Kopparbergs/Göteborg FC

- Svenska Cupen Women: 2011–12
- Super Cup Women: 2013

AS Roma

- Serie A: 2022–23
- Supercoppa Italiana: 2022
