= Erin McLeod =

Canadian soccer player (born 1983)

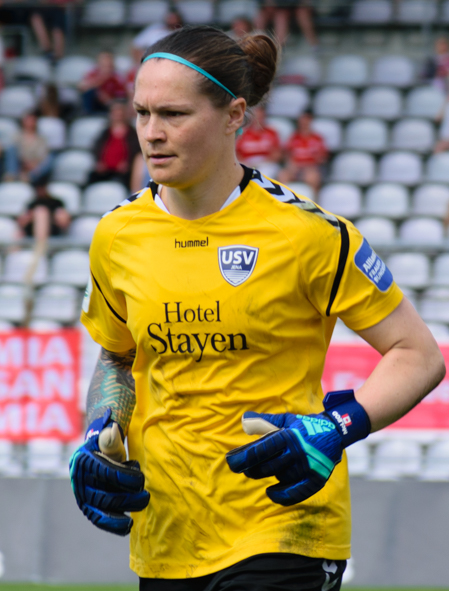
- McLeod in 2018

Personal information
- Full name: Erin Katrina McLeod
- Date of birth: February 26, 1983 (age 43)
- Place of birth: St. Albert, Alberta, Canada
- Height: 1.74 m (5 ft 9 in)
- Position: Goalkeeper

College career
Years	Team	Apps	(Gls)
2001–2002	SMU Mustangs	38	(0)
2004–2005	Penn State Nittany Lions	45	(0)

Senior career*
Years	Team	Apps	(Gls)
2004–2006	Vancouver Whitecaps	21	(0)
2009–2010	Washington Freedom	28	(0)
2011–2012	Dalsjöfors GoIF	16	(0)
2013	Chicago Red Stars	16	(0)
2014–2015	Houston Dash	31	(0)
2016–2017	FC Rosengård	13	(0)
2018	FF USV Jena	8	(0)
2018	SC Sand	0	(0)
2019	Växjö DFF	10	(0)
2020–2022	Orlando Pride	26	(0)
2020	→ Stjarnan (loan)	8	(0)
2023–2024	Stjarnan	27	(0)
2025	Halifax Tides	6	(0)
Total		210	(0)

International career^{‡}
2001–2002	Canada U19	22	(0)
2002–2021	Canada	119	(0)
Medal record
Olympic Games
Gold medal – first place	2020 Tokyo	Team
Bronze medal – third place	2012 London	Team
- * Club domestic league appearances and goals as of July 15, 2025 ‡ National team caps and goals as of January 27, 2023

Erin Katrina McLeod (born February 26, 1983) is a Canadian former soccer player who played as a goalkeeper.

She first appeared for the Canada women's national soccer team at the 2002 Algarve Cup and made a total of 119 appearances for the team. In 2012, as part of the Canadian Soccer Association's Centennial Celebration, she was honoured on the All-Time Canada XI women's in a 20-year career. McLeod represented Canada in four FIFA Women's World Cups: 2003 in the U.S., 2007 in China, 2011 in Germany and 2015 in Canada. She played in two Olympic tournaments: 2008 in Beijing and 2012 in London where she helped Canada win the bronze medal.

Before joining FC Rosengård in 2015, she played professional soccer for the Vancouver Whitecaps, Washington Freedom, Dalsjöfors GoIF, Chicago Red Stars, and Houston Dash. She played collegiate soccer for the Southern Methodist University Mustangs as well as the Penn State Nittany Lions where she set several all-time records.

McLeod's most notable and controversial appearance came during the 2012 Summer Olympics in London. In the semi-final match against the United States on August 6, the referee ruled that McLeod had broken the six-second handling rule in the 76th minute, when Canada was leading 3–2. A free kick was given to the United States which resulted in a penalty being called on Canadian player Marie-Ève Nault after the ball struck her in the arm. The United States was given a penalty kick, which McLeod did not save. The United States ultimately won the game in overtime, eliminating Canada's chance for the gold medal.

McLeod suffered three ACL injuries to her right knee during her playing career. The final of these occurred in March 2016, while she was playing for FC Rosengård, and kept her out for the 2016 Summer Olympics in Rio de Janeiro.

== Early life ==
Born to Cheryl and Doug McLeod in St. Albert, Alberta, a city near Edmonton, Erin was raised with her younger sister, Cara, and older sister, Megan. As a young girl, McLeod fell in love with hockey and the Edmonton Oilers. At the age of five, her family moved to Calgary, where she channelled her obsession into soccer. She quickly climbed the local soccer ranks and found herself a midfielder on a Calgary select team. At the age of 12, the goalkeeper on the team was injured and she stepped up for the spot. She would go on to play solely as a goalkeeper from this point.

At practice, she's the first one there, she always wants to do one more thing. It doesn't matter how cold or rainy it is outside, she's always out on the field.

— Doug McLeod (Erin's father)

McLeod's father, Doug, was an oil engineer, a job that required him to move around frequently. In 1997, when McLeod was 14, she and her family moved to Jakarta, Indonesia, where she spent both grades 9 and 10 at Jakarta Intercultural School. While in Jakarta, McLeod captained the under-15 Jakarta all-stars as the only girl on the team. She was able to greatly improve her game by playing with boys. She grew too old for the all-star team the following year and was left to play on the high school team with many girls who had never played soccer before.

During the May 1998 riots in Indonesia, McLeod, then 15, and her family were forced to evacuate due to the impending danger. The main airport in Jakarta was too dangerous at the time and they were forced to fly out from a smaller airport, passing a long line of tanks on the way there. She noted that it "opened up [her] eyes to what's going on in the world" and that she didn't "know poverty like they do." McLeod and her family eventually returned to their home in Indonesia, where she remained for another year.

While in Indonesia, McLeod was plagued by body image issues and developed an eating disorder. She was "bigger" than many girls at her high school, and would often skip meals and exercise excessively; her family eventually hired a nutritionist to help her recover.

In the summer of 1999, before McLeod entered grade 11, she made the decision to move back to Calgary to live with her grandmother, leaving her parents and younger sister behind in Jakarta. After making the move back to Canada, McLeod caught the attention of Canadian under-19 coach Ian Bridge and reached her dream of representing Canada on the international stage.

== College career ==
=== SMU Mustangs ===
McLeod attended Southern Methodist University and played for the Mustangs in the Western Athletic Conference (WAC) for the 2001 and 2002 seasons. In her rookie season, she made 84 saves and conceded 25 goals, ending the year off with a 14–4–0 record and six clean sheets. She recorded a 1.36 goals against average (GAA) for the season. In 2002, she made 85 saves and conceded 23 goals in 18 games. She ended the season with a 9–5–4 record and four clean sheets, making 4.72 saves per game and recording a 1.19 goals against average (GAA).

During her career at SMU, McLeod played 38 games, starting 18. She had a career record of 23–9–4, with 10 clean sheets, 4.45 saves per game, and a 0.779 save percentage. She made 169 saves in the 3390 minutes she played for the Mustangs.

McLeod was named to the All-WAC Tournament Team in 2001 and the Academic All-WAC Team in 2002. She received First Team All-WAC Honours and NSCAA All-Region Honours in both 2001 and 2002.

=== Penn State Nittany Lions ===
Following her role on the bench for the Canadian national team at the 2003 FIFA Women's World Cup, McLeod starting looking at other schools. After fellow Canadian international Carmelina Moscato told McLeod that Pennsylvania State University was looking for a goalkeeper, McLeod transferred to the school and played for the Nittany Lions for the 2004 and 2005 seasons while majoring in creative advertising.

McLeod quickly took over the starting goalkeeper position for the 2004 season. Although a shoulder injury pained her throughout the season, she appeared in 21 of 23 games, playing a total of 1885 minutes. She led the Big Ten Conference in clean sheets with 11 total for the season and ranked second in the nation in goals against average (GAA) at 0.43. McLeod conceded 9 goals and recorded 56 saves during the season. She earned third team NSCAA All-America honours, first team All-Big Ten honours, and first team All-Mid Atlantic Region honours for 2004, becoming the second goalkeeper to earn All-America honours for the Nittany Lions.

In 2005, McLeod once again was the star goalkeeper for the team, appearing in 24 of the 25 games of the season. She played a total of 2,187 minutes, conceding 20 goals and recording 85 saves for the entire season. She helped the Nittany Lions go undefeated in the regular season to become one of the few teams in NCAA history to finish the season undefeated and not win a national championship. She earned first team NSCAA All-American honours, first team All-Big Ten honours, first team All-Mid Atlantic Region honours, third team ESPN The Magazine Academic All-America honours, and Big Ten Defensive Player of the Year for 2005. The same year, she was named a M.A.C. Hermann Trophy semi-finalist.

==== Penn State statistics ====
Year	GP/GS	Min	Record	SO	SV	GC	GAA
2004	21/19	1885:59	17–2–1	11	56	9	0.43
2005	24/24	2187:18	22–0–2	10.47	85	20	0.82
Total	45/43	4037:17	39–2–3	21.47	141	29	0.64

Updated through 2016-06-16

==== Penn State all-time records ====
McLeod's record 11 clean sheets in 21 games during the 2004 season rank second all-time at Penn State as of June 2016. Her 0.957 winning percentage during the 2005 season is ranked first of all time, while her winning percentage in 2004 of 0.875 is ranked second at the school. In 2004, her 0.43 goals against average (GAA) ranked second best of all time. The same year, she also conceded the fewest goals in one season. As of June 2016, she still holds the all-time career record for highest winning percentage (0.92), fewest goals against average (0.64), and consecutive clean sheet minutes (857:24).

== Club career ==
=== Vancouver Whitecaps ===
McLeod played with the Vancouver Whitecaps in the W-League in 2004 and 2006. While playing for the Whitecaps, the team never lost a game and she helped bring in the club's first championship victory in 2004. In the championship game, she made two saves in the penalty shootout and scored the game-winning penalty kick. In 2006, she helped the Whitecaps win a second W-League title after securing a clean sheet in the final against Ottawa Fury.

=== Washington Freedom ===
On April 16, 2009, the Washington Freedom announced they had signed McLeod as a post-International Draft discovery claim for the inaugural season of Women's Professional Soccer league. Though it was intended that McLeod would be the team's starting goalkeeper, visa issues kept her unavailable for the first five matches of the regular season. She made her first appearance for the team on May 17, 2009 and was the starting goalkeeper in all fifteen of her appearances. The Freedom finished in third place during the regular season with a 8–7–5 record, sending them to the playoffs. The team was defeated 2–1 by eventual champions Sky Blue FC in the first round.

McLeod returned as the starting goalkeeper for the Freedom during the 2010 WPS season. She made fourteen appearances for the team before she suffered a season-ending ACL injury to her right knee in the 84th minute of a match against FC Gold Pride on July 24, 2010. The Freedom finished in fourth place during the regular season with a 8–9–7 record, earning a spot in the playoffs. The team was defeated 1–0 in overtime by the Philadelphia Independence in the first round. Following the 2010 season, the Washington Freedom was purchased by Dan Borislow who renamed the team magicJack and relocated it to Boca Raton, Florida. McLeod remained on the roster following the team's ownership change until her contract was terminated on March 9, 2011.

=== Dalsjöfors GoIF ===
McLeod signed with Swedish team Dalsjöfors GoIF of the Damallsvenskan for the 2011 season. Though the season ran from April 9 to October 15, McLeod didn't make an appearance for the team until August 13, following her return from national team duties at the 2011 FIFA Women's World Cup. She started all ten of her appearances for the team, winning one game on October 8. The team finished in last place in the regular season and was relegated to a lower division for the following season.

=== Chicago Red Stars ===
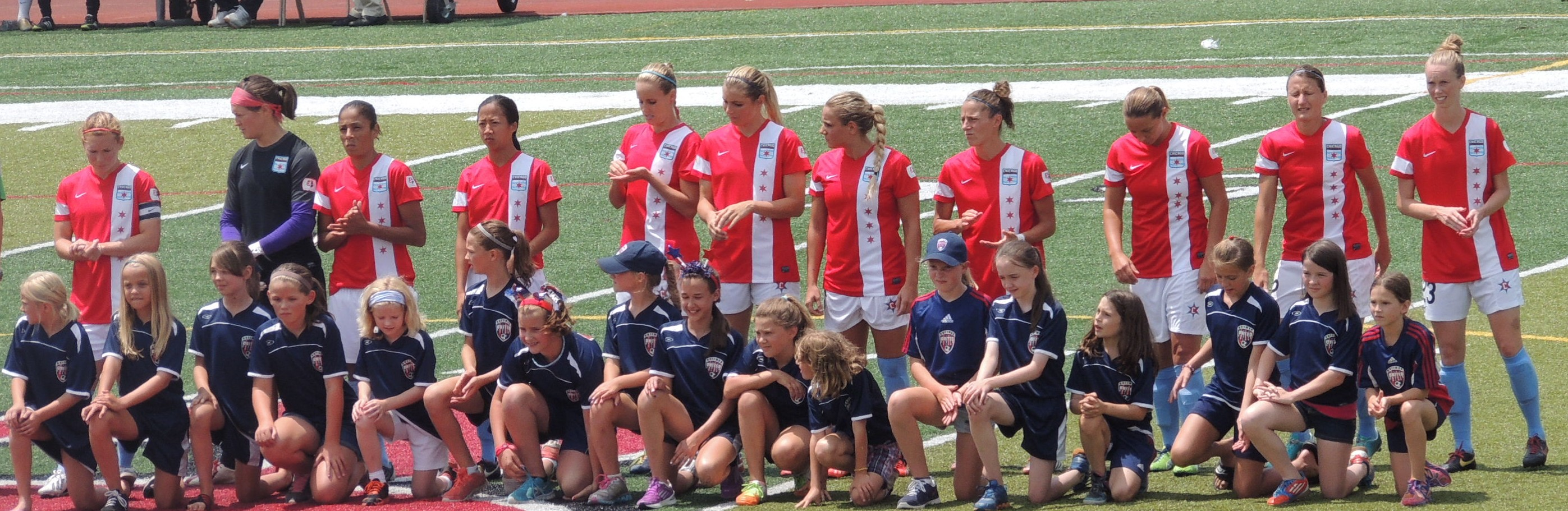
McLeod (second from top left) with the Chicago Red Stars, July 2013

In January 2013, McLeod joined the Chicago Red Stars in the new National Women's Soccer League as part of the NWSL Player Allocation, which distributed national team players from the United States, Canada, and Mexico. She started in the league's first-ever game on April 14, 2013, against the Seattle Reign. The game ended in a 1–1 draw.

McLeod started all sixteen of her appearances for the Red Stars and ended the season with a 1–2 win over FC Kansas City on August 18. For the 2013 NWSL season, she ranked seventh in the league for number of saves with 64 and fifth for number of clean sheets with four. Her save percentage for the season was 70%, saving 64 of the 92 shots on goal.

=== Houston Dash ===
I might be a bit biased because I've played with Erin before. Being through the professional ranks and playing on the U.S. team and playing all over the world, I don't think I've ever met anyone that has been as dedicated or put the team before herself more than McLeod.

— Ella Masar

In January 2014, McLeod was traded to expansion team Houston Dash for fellow Canadian international Melissa Tancredi, who had been newly allocated to the Dash as part of the 2014 NWSL Player Allocation. McLeod was named captain of the team for the 2014 NWSL Season on April 8 after a vote by her teammates.

McLeod was the starting goalkeeper in the team's league debut against the Portland Thorns on April 13, 2014. She conceded one goal, leading to the first loss of the season for the Dash. She made twenty appearances for the team during the 2014 season, starting nineteen. She ranked second in the league for number of saves with 83 and ended the season with a save percentage of 69%.

In 2015, Ella Masar took over as the Houston Dash captain because of McLeod's expected time away for the 2015 FIFA Women's World Cup. Due to her national team duties, McLeod made 11 appearances in 20 regular season games. Despite playing in only half of the games during the 2015 season, she ranked third in the league for number of saves with 60, a save percentage of 81%. McLeod stated that she was playing some of the best soccer in her career during the 2015 season, and was there in the final push to get the Dash into the playoffs; the team ultimately finished in fifth place, just outside of playoff position. She played her last game with the Dash on September 6, 2015, in a match against the Chicago Red Stars that ended in a 1–1 draw.

She ended her time with the Houston Dash with a 7–18–6 record.

=== FC Rosengård ===
Following the 2015 NWSL season, McLeod was released by the Dash in order to pursue the chance to play in the UEFA Women's Champions League. It was announced in February 2016 that she had signed with Swedish team, FC Rosengård, along with Dash teammate (and then-wife) Masar. McLeod made her debut for the team in the 2016 Super Cup on March 16, where FC Rosengård won 2–1. On March 23, 2016, McLeod played 13 minutes of a preseason friendly before being forced off due to a knee injury. It was later revealed that McLeod had suffered a third injury to her right ACL, although the injury had most likely occurred a month earlier while playing with the Canadian national team. The injury caused her to miss the entire 2016 season, returning to make her Damallsvenskan debut in a 5–0 win over Göteborg on May 7, 2017. Rosengård chose not to renew McLeod's contract at the end of 2017.

=== FF USV Jena ===
On January 25, 2018, McLeod signed for FF USV Jena in Germany for the second half of the 2017–18 Bundesliga season. McLeod made her debut on February 25 in a 1–1 draw with Werder Bremen. In total she made eight appearances, keeping two clean sheets and conceding 13 goals. The team finished bottom of the league and was relegated.

=== SC Sand ===
Following USV Jena's relegation, McLeod signed a contract with SC Sand, remaining in the Bundesliga. A combination of recurring injuries and squad competition meant McLeod was only included in three matchday squads as a substitute during the first half of the season, failing to make an appearance before having her contract mutually terminated in November 2018.

=== Växjö DFF ===
On November 18, 2018, McLeod returned to the Damallsvenskan, signing with Växjö DFF ahead of the 2019 season. She made her debut for the club on February 9, 2019, in a 1–0 Svenska Cupen defeat to Göteborg. She made her first league appearance on April 17, 2019, playing 16 minutes against Linköpings FC before being substituted off injured.

=== Orlando Pride ===
On February 14, 2020, McLeod returned to the NWSL, signing for Orlando Pride on a one-year contract with an option for an additional year. With preseason and the upcoming league schedule canceled due to the COVID-19 pandemic, McLeod was unable to feature for Orlando in 2020 after the Pride were also forced to withdraw from the return to play 2020 NWSL Challenge Cup following multiple positive COVID-19 tests among both players and staff. On January 24, 2023, Orlando announced McLeod would be departing the club to relocate to Iceland, the home country of wife and teammate Gunnhildur Jónsdóttir following their marriage earlier in the month.

==== Loan to Stjarnan ====
On August 14, 2020, McLeod joined Icelandic Úrvalsdeild team Stjarnan on loan for the rest of the season.

=== Stjarnan ===
In January 2023, McLeod re-signed for Stjarnan.

=== Halifax Tides FC ===
Having initially planned on retirement, McLeod was approached by Northern Super League side Halifax Tides and signed in October 2024. McLeod played in the club's inaugural match on April 26, 2025, a 4–1 defeat to the Calgary Wild. Having sustained a season-ending injury in June, on Wednesday September 3, 2025, she announced her retirement from professional soccer. She took on the roles of technical consultant and head of player development for Inter Halifax Soccer Club, and serves on the NSL advisory group.

== International career ==
=== 2001-2002: Youth level ===
In May 2000, McLeod was 1 of 40 players selected by the Canadian Soccer Association for a week-long training camp in Vancouver, BC for the newly formed Canadian women's under-19 and under-17 national teams. She was subsequently named to the under-17 roster. Later that year, McLeod was called up for the under-17 training camps in Nebraska and subsequent friendlies that took place in August.

McLeod played in the under-19 team's first international tournament, the third annual adidas Cup, in May 2001. She started in goal for the May 29 match against China, which they lost 3–0. She was the starting goalkeeper in a match against Japan on May 31, helping to record the first international win for Canada's under-19 team. During Canada's final game of the tournament against Finland, McLeod was subbed in for Anne Ogundele during the second half. Canada lost 3–2, resulting in a tied third-place position.

After McLeod was called up for an under-21 training camp in June 2001, she appeared in two friendlies against Mexico. Later in June, she was called up for an under-19 training camp in Toronto. Following the camp, the under-19 team took on the United States in two friendlies on June 30 and July 2. McLeod started in goal for both games, conceding twelve goals across both matches.

McLeod was named to the 18-player roster for the under-21 Open Nordic Cup in Gjorvik, Norway held July 25–31, 2001. The team arrived a week before the tournament to train and participate in an exhibition match against a 1. divisjon all-star team on July 23. McLeod made several appearances during the tournament, with Canada earning fifth place.

=== 2002 Algarve Cup ===
McLeod's received her first call-up to the senior national team in March 2002 for the Algarve Cup. She was among eight under-19 players that were added to the 20-player roster for the tournament in Portugal. McLeod earned her first international cap with the senior national team on March 3, 2002, in the team's second match of the tournament against Wales, recording her first clean sheet in the 4–0 win. She made a second appearance in the tournament in a match against Portugal, conceding one goal. McLeod made her final appearance of the tournament in the team's final match against Finland, conceding three goals.

McLeod was named to the senior national team for the Tournoi international de France from April 3–9, 2002. During Canada's first match of the tournament on April 3 (and McLeod's sole appearance at the tournament), she earned her second career clean sheet with a 0–0 draw.

=== 2002 FIFA U-19 Women's World Championship ===
==== Qualifying ====
McLeod spent the summer of 2002 training with both the under-19 and senior national teams. She was named to the 18-player roster for the under-19 training camp in Florida from April 10–14, 2002. The team also participated in a tournament during the camp, which served as a qualifying tournament for the first FIFA Under-19 Women's World Championship held later in the summer; however, Canada already qualified as the host nation. McLeod started in goal for both matches of the tournament.

==== Road to the World Championship ====
McLeod was called up for the under-19 training camp and three-game series against Italy held between May 26 – June 5, 2002 in preparation for the FIFA U-19 Women's World Championship. She recorded a clean sheet during the first match on May 30 and started in all three games.

McLeod played in goal for a three-game series against Mexico from June 25 – July 6, 2002 following an under-19 training camp. She recorded a clean sheet during the second game of the series on July 3. As the goalkeeper for the final three games of the Road to the World Championship series, she contributed to three straight wins for the team: two against Chinese Taipei and one against Brazil. She posted a clean sheet with a 2–0 win over Brazil in the final game on August 11.

McLeod was invited to train with the senior national team in Toronto in preparation for an international friendly against Norway in July of the same year. She started in goal for the friendly on July 17, which resulted in a 2–2 draw.

==== 2002 FIFA U-19 Women's World Championship ====
McLeod started all six of Canada's games in the first FIFA U-19 Women's World Championship, held August 17 – September 1, 2002. Highly recognizable for her red and white Mohawk hairstyle throughout the tournament, she conceded six goals in the six games, ending the tournament with a 4–1–1 record. Following the tournament, she was named to the FIFA All-Star Team, along with fellow Canadians Candace Chapman, Carmelina Moscato, and Christine Sinclair.

=== Transition to the senior national team ===
McLeod fully transitioned to the Canadian senior national team following her performance at the U-19 World Championship. She has stated that the transition was difficult for her due to the great depth of goalkeepers already with the national team, noting she often took the back seat to more experienced players, which affected her confidence.

In October 2002, McLeod was named to the 18-player roster for the 2002 CONCACAF Gold Cup, the qualifying tournament for the 2003 FIFA Women's World Cup. McLeod made one appearance during the tournament in Canada's first match against Haiti, allowing one goal in the 11–1 win. McLeod was forced to leave the tournament early to return to her Southern Methodist University team in order to maintain her scholarship.

=== 2003–2006: The struggle for caps ===
From 2003 to 2006, McLeod made 22 appearances for the Canadian national team, four of those being in major tournaments.

McLeod made the 18-player roster for the 2003 Algarve Cup in Portugal held March 14–20, 2003 and made one appearance during the team's final match against Greece. She was the starting goalkeeper in four of five other appearances for the national team in 2003, conceding six goals and recording one clean sheet.

In September 2003, McLeod represented Canada at the 2003 FIFA Women's World Cup though she did not make an appearance during the tournament. Following the tournament, McLeod moved to Vancouver to live with another goalkeeper in order to gain more practice and improve her game.

McLeod made one appearance for Canada during the Four Nations tournament in China on January 30, 2004, against China. Her second appearance in 2004 came during the CONCACAF Women's Olympic Qualifying tournament in March. She was subbed in during the 69th minute of the March 5 match against Costa Rica, helping to secure a third place win. Because of the team's third-place finish, Canada did not qualify for the 2004 Summer Olympics.

McLeod did not make another appearance for the national team until 2006. She was invited to the first training camp of 2006 in mid-January; it was the first training camp she had taken part in since July 2004. McLeod was named to a 17-women roster for two matches against the Netherlands in March 2006. She started in goal for one of the matches, conceding one goal in 90 minutes played. In April, she made the 18-women roster for a four-city, five-match tour of the United States, where the Canadian team played various college teams. Following the tour, McLeod appeared and started in seven friendlies for Canada from June to August, conceding eight goals total and recording two clean sheets.

McLeod was a member of the 20-player team that played in the inaugural Peace Queen Cup that took place in South Korea between October and November 2006. She was the starting goalkeeper in all four of Canada's games in the tournament, losing only once to the United States in the final.

McLeod was named to the 22-player roster that represented Canada during the 2006 CONCACAF Women's Gold Cup in November, which served as the qualifying tournament for the 2007 FIFA Women's World Cup. As the starting goalkeeper for the semi-final match against Jamaica, she recorded a clean sheet, earning Canada the win and a place in the championship final and 2007 World Cup. In the championship final against the United States, McLeod was the starting goalkeeper and conceded one goal in regular time, leading to a tie after 90 minutes. In the last minute of extra time, Kristine Lilly of the United States scored on a penalty kick against McLeod, giving the United States the Gold Cup title.

=== 2007 FIFA Women's World Cup ===
McLeod and the national team began preparation for the 2007 FIFA Women's World Cup with a residency camp in Vancouver in the months leading up to the September tournament. Leading up to the World Cup, McLeod started in goal in three international friendlies for Canada, conceding nine goals and recording one clean sheet.

As Canada's starting goalkeeper at the 2007 World Cup in China, McLeod played in all three of the team's matches during the group stage of the tournament. She conceded three goals in 259 minutes played, recording one clean sheet in a match against Ghana. The team placed third in their group, ending their tournament journey.

McLeod and the national team regrouped in November 2007 for another residency camp to begin preparing for the 2008 Summer Olympics.

=== 2008 and the Beijing Olympics ===
In January 2008, McLeod was named to the 21-player roster for the Four Nations tournament in China. The four-team, three-game tournament took place in late January and provided preparation for the Canadian team ahead of the CONCACAF Women's Olympic Qualifying Tournament later that year. McLeod made one appearance during the tournament in Canada's first match against the United States. She started and played the full 90 minutes of the game. McLeod was named to the roster for a European trip that included the Cyprus Cup from March 5–12 and two international friendlies. McLeod was the starting goalkeeper for two of three matches in the Cyprus Cup, conceding one goal and recording a clean sheet. She recorded a clean sheet in an international friendly as the starting goalkeeper against France on March 14.

As Canada's starting goalkeeper at the 2008 CONCACAF Women's Olympic Qualifying Tournament in April, McLeod recorded three clean sheets and conceded one goal in the final against the United States. The team's April 9 semi-final win over Mexico was her sixth clean sheet of the season, setting a national team record. She helped Canada set a CONCACAF record with 509 consecutive clean sheet minutes. Canada's second-place finish at the tournament earned the team a spot at the 2008 Summer Olympics in Beijing. Following the Olympic Qualifying Tournament, McLeod started in two friendlies in May against the United States and Australia before the Peace Queen Cup in Korea in June. She recorded one clean sheet during the tournament. After the Peace Queen Cup, McLeod and Canada's women's national team resumed the Vancouver residency program for final preparations for the 2008 Women's Olympic Football Tournament. The residency included three friendlies in July against Brazil, New Zealand, and Singapore; McLeod started in the matches against New Zealand and Singapore and conceded two goals.

==== Women's Olympic Football Tournament, injury, and setbacks ====
McLeod represented Canada at the 2008 Summer Olympics in Beijing that took place from August 6–21. During the group stage, she was the starting goalkeeper for all three of Canada's matches against Argentina, China, and Sweden. She conceded four goals in three matches, helping Canada advance to the knockout stage.

During the quarter-finals, Canada faced the United States with McLeod starting in goal. In the twelfth minute of the game, American player Heather O'Reilly made a shot on goal, but it was stopped by McLeod. Angela Hucles then got the rebound and scored for the United States. However, McLeod injured her right knee during the play. She was down for several minutes before she got up and attempted to resume playing. A few minutes later, she was replaced by goalkeeper Karina LeBlanc in the 19th minute. The United States won the game 1–2. It was later revealed that McLeod had torn her right ACL.

Following the injury, McLeod stated that she was relieved because the injury gave her a much needed break from the national team. After the 2007 World Cup, she experienced a drop in confidence due to both her own negative thoughts about her performances as well as derogatory comments about her sexuality made by fellow national team players. It took her a number of years to consistently return to the national team.

=== 2009-2010: Attempted comeback and another injury ===
Following her ACL injury, McLeod did not make an appearance for the Canadian national team until July 2009. She made one appearance for the team in 2009 during an international friendly against the United States on July 22, where she conceded one goal. She was noted for making several impressive saves during the match. McLeod returned to training with the national team in November for the 12-day camp in Florida which featured 22 players and a pair of exhibition matches against local university teams.

In February 2010, McLeod joined the national team for an 18-day training camp that included four matches in the Cyprus Cup and an international friendly against Poland. McLeod started in the friendly against Poland on February 20, recording a clean sheet. She also made one start in the Cyprus Cup against South Africa, conceding one goal. She made one other appearance in 2010 in a friendly in April against China before sustaining another ACL injury in July while playing with the Washington Freedom.

=== Comeback and disappointment ===
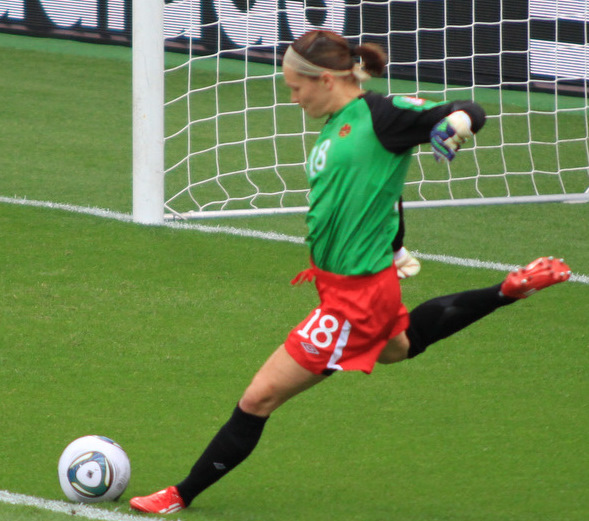
McLeod at the 2011 FIFA Women's World Cup in Germany, July 2011

McLeod recovered from her second ACL injury quickly and was on the 24-player roster that competed in Chongqing, China at the Four Nations Tournament in late January 2011. She appeared in one of three matches against China on January 21. After the Four Nations tournament, the Canadian national team convened for their traditional residency program in preparation for the FIFA Women's World Cup. The team trained in Italy from February 12–22 preceding the Cyprus Cup. McLeod appeared in three of the four matches in the Cyprus Cup, recording two clean sheets. Following the tournament, the Canadian team took a break during which McLeod hosted Special Goalkeeper Training Sessions. The team reconvened for a four-week training camp from March 23 – April 20 in Roma, Italy to prepare for the World Cup. During the camp, McLeod appeared in three friendlies and recorded two clean sheets.

As Canada's starting goalkeeper at the 2011 FIFA Women's World Cup in Germany, McLeod appeared in two of three matches in the group stage, conceding six goals. Despite an impressive effort, the Canadian team did not advance past the group stage. Some have stated that the team was burned out following the extensive residency program leading up to the World Cup. Players were also critical of the decision of head coach Carolina Morace to hold the camp in Italy as opposed to Canada. Following the tournament, McLeod appeared in friendlies against the United States and Sweden.

=== 2012 London Olympics ===
I started embracing error – if I wasn't making mistakes in training or games, I wasn't going out of my comfort zone enough. I started embracing feedback and people's help. It made me want to help others around me in return.

— Erin McLeod

After the 2011 FIFA Women's World Cup, John Herdman was hired as head coach of the Canadian national team. He rebuilt the team and used inclusive language to help create an environment that allowed players to be honest with each other and grow. McLeod was able to address issues that she had with herself and others, which she attributed to helping rebuild her confidence.

Leading up to the 2012 Olympics, McLeod helped the Canadian team qualify at the CONCACAF Women's Olympic Qualifying tournament that took place in Vancouver. She started in the group stage match against Cuba on January 21 and recorded a clean sheet. She made one other appearance during the tournament in the final match against the United States on January 29 at BC Place. During the match, she conceded four goals, resulting in a 4–0 win for the United States.

Following a 10-day training camp in Cyprus in February 2012, McLeod was named to the 21-player roster for the 2012 Cyprus Cup that ran from February 28 to March 6. She appeared in two of Canada's four matches in the tournament, including the final against France. From April until late June, McLeod joined her teammates in an extended residency camp in Vancouver in preparation for the 2012 Olympics. During the camp, the team played in various friendlies; McLeod appeared and started in four friendlies, recording two clean sheets.

McLeod was Canada's starting goalkeeper at the 2012 Summer Olympics in London. During the group stage, she played in two matches against Japan and Sweden on July 25 and 31, respectively. She conceded four goals in the two matches. In the quarter-finals, McLeod started in goal against Great Britain and secured a clean sheet.

McLeod started in the semi-final game against the United States on August 6, in what many have called a controversial match. In the 78th minute of the game, Canada was leading, 3–2, when the referee ruled that McLeod had held the ball for more than six seconds, going by a rule that is rarely enforced, and gave an indirect free kick inside the penalty area to the United States. McLeod faced no challenge with the free kick however the referee then called a penalty after the ball struck Canadian player Marie-Eve Nault on the arm. American striker Abby Wambach took the penalty kick, and scored. The match went into extra time, with Alex Morgan heading in the ball past McLeod's fingertips in the 123rd minute, resulting in a win for the United States.

McLeod started in the Bronze medal match against France on August 9. Her clean sheet helped Canada win the bronze medal.

=== 2013–2014 ===
McLeod was named to the national team roster for the Four Nations tournament that took place in Yongchuan, China in January 2013. She started in two of the three matches, recording two clean sheets. In March, she started in three of the four matches at the Cyprus Cup, conceding only one goal in all three games. The national team travelled to Europe for eight days in April 2013, where McLeod started in two friendlies against France and England, conceding one goal in each match. McLeod was named Canada's player of the match in the draw against France on April 4. She was the starting goalkeeper against the United States on June 2 in Toronto. Later in June, McLeod played during a friendly against Germany and was named Canada's player of the match for the second time in 2013. McLeod started in goal four more times in 2013, including two friendlies and two matches in the Torneio Internacional Cidade de São Paulo in December. All four games were clean sheets for Canada.

In 2014, McLeod appeared in seven games, starting six. The year started off with a friendly against the United States on January 31, where McLeod conceded one goal. In March of the same year, she started in two matches during the Cyprus Cup. The last four matches of the year for McLeod were international friendlies, including another match up against the United States on May 8, which ended in a 1–1 draw. On November 24, 2014, McLeod made her 100th appearance for the senior team and recorded a clean sheet in a friendly match against Sweden at Loyola Marymount University in Los Angeles.

=== 2015 ===
==== 2015 FIFA Women's World Cup ====
In the months leading up to the 2015 FIFA Women's World Cup, McLeod joined the Canadian national team as they took part in an extended residency in order to prepare and train. McLeod and the Canadian national team started off the year at the Four Nations Tournament. While McLeod was on the roster for the tournament, she did not play in any of the three games, allowing Stephanie Labbé to gain experience. McLeod made her first appearance of the year at the Cyprus Cup in March, where she appeared in three of the four matches that Canada played, recording three clean sheets. She also appeared in friendlies against France and England in April and May.

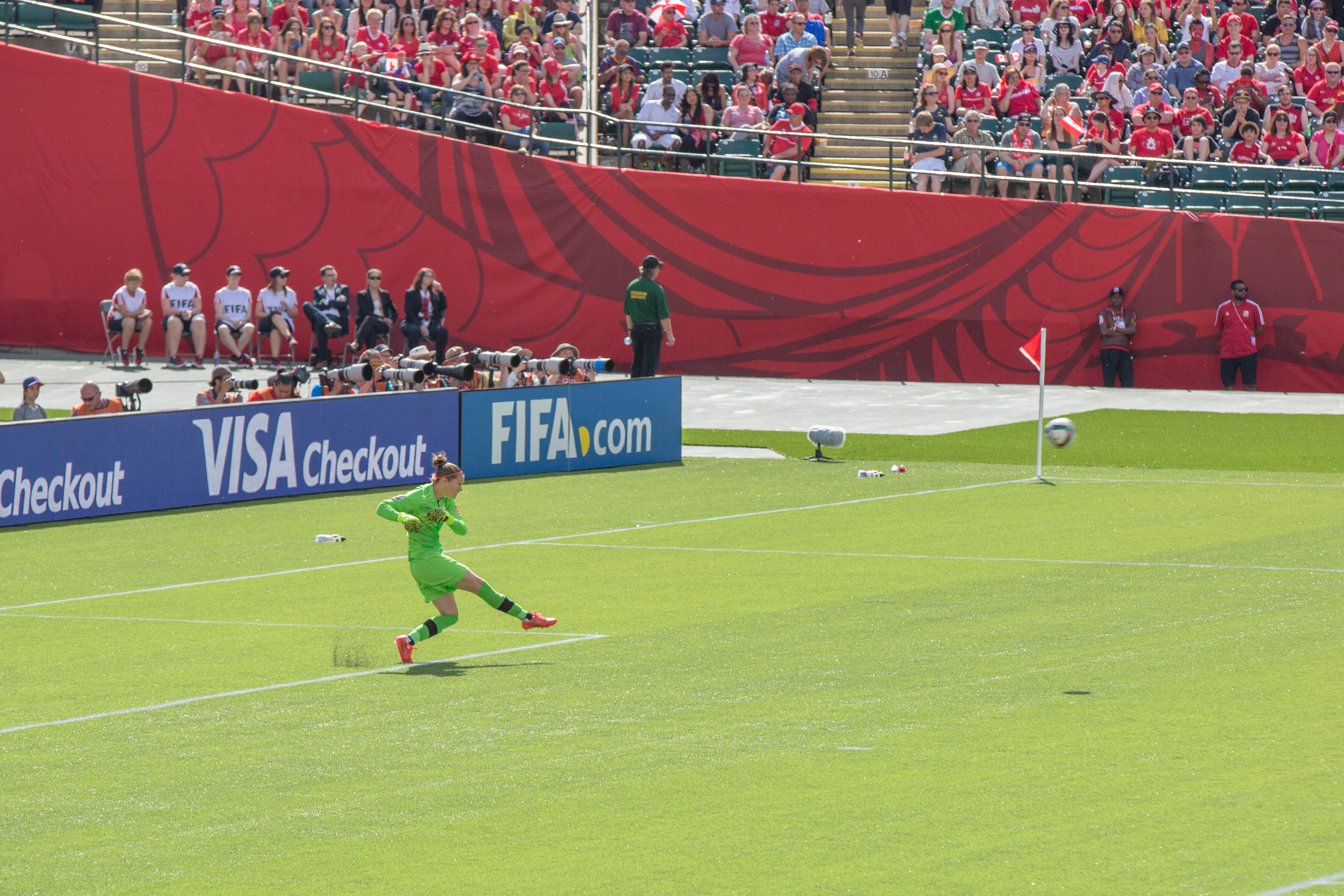
McLeod at the 2015 FIFA Women's World Cup in Edmonton, June 2015

In April 2015, McLeod was named to the 23-player Canadian roster for the FIFA Women's World Cup, a home tournament for Canada. As Canada's veteran goalkeeper, she started in net for all five of the team's matches, recording three clean sheets, and helping Canada earn a sixth-place finish. The team's first loss came in the quarter-finals against England, which halted their advancement in the tournament. Although McLeod had an impressive tournament, she was left off both the Golden Glove shortlist and the FIFA Technical Study Group All-Star Squad.

==== Injury ====
Following the 2015 World Cup, McLeod was named to the national team roster for the Torneio Internacional de Natal. During her second appearance of the tournament on December 20 – a match against Brazil – McLeod jumped for an incoming ball in the 35th minute and collided with Brazilian player Marta. McLeod landed awkwardly on her right leg, sustaining ligament damage in her right knee. She walked off the field on her own accord.

=== 2016 ===
Despite her injury, McLeod returned to the pitch quickly, starting in three games at the CONCACAF Women's Olympic Qualifier in February 2016 where she recorded two clean sheets. On February 19, McLeod joined the national team for their semifinal match against Costa Rica. In the warmup for the game, she again injured her right knee and left the warmup early. However, she played all 90 minutes of the match. Following the tournament, she returned to Sweden to play with her club team, FC Rosengård. In March 2016, her knee collapsed after kicking a ball while playing with FC Rosengård. It was revealed that she had torn her ACL in her right knee for the third time. Later, her surgeon stated that the injury had most likely occurred in the warmup before Canada's match against Costa Rica. McLeod stated that her recovery was expected to take one to two years and planned to be back on the field in February or March 2017.

=== 2020 Tokyo Olympics ===
In June 2021, McLeod was named as one of four alternates for the delayed 2020 Summer Olympics. The following month it was confirmed that the IOC and FIFA would be expanding rosters to 22 meaning the four alternates could now be named to a matchday squad. McLeod was an unused substitute for one game, a 2–1 group stage win against Chile, which made her eligible for a medal as Canada won gold for the first time.

=== Retirement ===
She announced her retirement from international soccer in January 2023 having made her last appearance in a friendly against New Zealand in October 2021.

== Player profile ==
=== Style of play ===
In the early years of her career, McLeod's playing style was described as exuberant, with "boisterous" energy. Her kinetic style of goalkeeping was something that came naturally to her in her youth. Tim Rosenfeld, who would go on to become a coach at the University of Wisconsin, first saw McLeod in the early 2000s while he was coaching at Penn State University and noted that she was "out of control" and kept coming off her line "going for balls she had no business going for." When she eventually transferred to Penn State in 2004, Rosenfeld stated that "she'd make saves that no one in the world could make, but she'd also made decisions that allowed a bad goal." As a youth player in 2002, the FIFA U-19 Women's World Championship Technical Study Group noted that she was "self-assured in all situations," has "good positioning" and "organized defense well."

After gaining more experience in goal, McLeod improved her control and composure. Canadian head coach John Herdman noted her ability to stay focused, sharp and alert as well as her strength when faced with great crosses. In 2007, the FIFA Women's World Cup Technical Study Group stated that she was an "influential goalkeeper" with "steady performances." In 2012, the Olympic Football Tournament Technical Study Group noted that she was a "reliable goalkeeper with good positional play" and that she "comes off her line to good effect." She has been noted for her dedication, hard work, and attention to detail when playing.

McLeod has been known to rely on meditation to deal with mental fatigue and mentally prepare for games. She has said that Buddhist principles drive her meditation and her lifestyle. Herdman noted that, because of this, McLeod had a calm and comforting presence on the field. She has been recognized for her leadership on and off the field. Her ability to effectively communicate with her back line allowed her to take complete control, creating an organized defence. In 2015, the FIFA Women's World Cup Technical Study Group called her a "goalkeeper with good positioning and technique" and stated that she "played with confidence and leadership" and "communicated well from the back."

== Outside of football ==
=== Noble Motives Collective ===
McLeod and fashion designer Adelle Renaud founded the Noble Motives Collective composed of Peau de Loup, a button down shirt company; Caposhie, a fashion boutique located in West Vancouver; and Motive Athletics, McLeod's athletic clothing line. Peau de Loup was founded in early 2013 by Renaud and McLeod joined the company in October of the same year. Caposhie opened for business in October 2015 in the Park Royal Shopping Center in West Vancouver. Motive Athletics was revealed in late 2015, with some promotional products being sold in Caposhie, but was not officially launched until July 2016. On November 4, 2015, McLeod appeared on the business reality show Dragons' Den presenting her company and getting a deal.

In June 2015, Peau de Loup teamed up with the Canadian Soccer Association to launch an exclusive collection in support of the women's national team at the 2015 FIFA Women's World Cup with a campaign named The Canadian Promise. The line included the Unity Scarf, which donned the word "Canada" on the inside, as well as the True North Flannel. Players from the Canadian national team could be seen wearing items from the collection during the tournament. In addition to their support for team Canada, Peau de Loup also supported Freedom Factory, a Canadian charity based in Surrey, British Columbia, and one dollar from every shirt sold went directly to the women of Al-lhsan.

=== Art gallery ===
In 2013, McLeod launched her art career with her first solo art exhibit "Limitless" from September 16–30 at the Jane Roos Gallery in Toronto. She created all of the pieces in just six months. After completing a successful showing, McLeod began working on commission pieces. In November 2014, she launched the Erin McLeod Gallery on Etsy, where she sold both original pieces and prints.

=== Philanthropy ===
McLeod was an ambassador for the Right To Play campaign, a program that sought to educate and empower youth in impoverished countries in order to build self-sustaining communities. Regarding her reason to get involved with the organization, McLeod stated, "I saw 7- or 8-year-olds who are taking care of a family of six because their parents have died of AIDS. It's one of the harshest circumstances I've ever seen."

McLeod has also worked with Rethink Breast Cancer, a program that educates young women on nutrition and body image in order to promote healthy living. She has cited her own body image issues and eating disorder as her reason for getting involved with the organization.

In 2013, McLeod became an ambassador for the non-profit organization Athlete Ally, which works to end homophobia and transphobia in sports. She stated that her performance on the field improved after she gained more confidence in who she was off the field. McLeod believes promoting such confidence and creating an accepting environment, as Athlete Ally strives to do, is important for athletes and is the reason she joined the organization.

=== Endorsements ===
In February 2015, McLeod signed an endorsement deal with Destination Chrysler Jeep Dodge Ram, in which she received a 2015 Jeep Wrangler Sahara. In March, she visited two schools in Vancouver in collaboration with the company to speak to younger children about her experiences with soccer and life.

=== Grass2Gold ===
McLeod and fellow Canadian international Melissa Tancredi co-founded the training program Grass2Gold for youth athletes in order to provide national level training for younger athletes so that they can reach their full potential.

== Personal life ==
When faced with discrimination sometimes I feel like screaming and fighting. … But then I remember – how happy and blessed I am to love her.

— Erin McLeod

=== Relationships ===
McLeod is openly lesbian. She came out publicly during a CBC interview following the controversy surrounding the 2014 Sochi Olympics and Russia's gay propaganda laws. She was among a group of athletes who called for a change in the language of the Olympic Charter and host-city contract to include non-discrimination of sexual orientation. She also served on the Canadian Athletes' Commission as the LGBT representative.

On July 6, 2015, McLeod married American teammate Ella Masar in Vancouver following the 2015 FIFA Women's World Cup. The two co-hosted a regular online web show called The Ella and Erin Show while playing for the Chicago Red Stars and later the Houston Dash in order to promote home games and give away tickets to fans. Masar and McLeod underwent an amicable separation in 2019, followed by divorce.

In October 2020, McLeod made public her relationship with Icelandic footballer Gunny Jónsdóttir. They married in January 2023. Jónsdóttir gave birth to their son in October 2024.

=== Tattoos ===
McLeod has several tattoos, the most noticeable being on her right arm. In 2002, following Canada's silver medal win at the Under-19 Women's World Championship, McLeod had the image of a Canadian Maple Leaf tattooed on her buttocks. Prior to the 2008 Summer Olympics in Beijing, she had a Washington Irving quote tattooed on her right forearm:

There is sacredness in tears. They are not the mark of weakness, but a power. They speak more eloquently than 10,000 tongues. They are the messengers of overwhelming grief and unspeakable love.

— Washington Irving

In addition to the quote, she had the Roman numeral "V" above the quote near the crevice of her elbow. While the "V" was meant to represent the five members of her immediate family, she had the tattoo covered up in early 2014. In its place is a black rectangle with the words "keep going" inscribed inside. At the same time, she had teal zigzag lines inked around her entire right forearm, surrounding the Washington Irving quote, a large owl wrapped around her arm, and script around her wrist, the latter two of which she got right after the 2012 Summer Olympics.

McLeod has the Roman numerals "X X IX" tattooed down the back of her neck, representing the 29th Olympiad. McLeod and ex-wife Masar have matching tattoos, which they received in the summer of 2015 following their wedding. The tattoo is simply composed of the word "one" located on the side of her ring finger.

== Player statistics ==
=== International summary ===
Canada
Year	Apps	Goals
2002	6	0
2003	6	0
2004	2	0
2005	0	0
2006	14	0
2007	6	0
2008	18	0
2009	1	0
2010	3	0
2011	11	0
2012	13	0
2013	13	0
2014	7	0
2015	12	0
2016	3	0
2017	0	0
2018	1	0
2019	2	0
2020	0	0
2021	1	0
Total	119	0

=== World Cup and Olympic appearances ===
Updated through 2016-06-16

Match	Date	Location	Opponent	GC	Min	CS	Result	Competition
2007 FIFA Women's World Cup
1	2007-09-12	Hangzhou, China	Norway	2	90	0	1–2 L	Group stage
2	2007-09-15	Hangzhou, China	Ghana	0	90	1	4–0 W	Group stage
3	2007-09-20	Chengdu, China	Australia	1	79	0	2–2 D	Group stage
2008 Women's Olympic Football Tournament
4	2008-08-06	Tianjin, China	Argentina	1	90	0	2–1 W	Group stage
5	2008-08-09	Tianjin, China	China	1	90	0	1–1 D	Group stage
6	2008-08-12	Beijing, China	Sweden	2	90	0	1–2 L	Group stage
7	2008-08-15	Shanghai, China	(United States) USA	1	19	0	1–2 L	Quarter-final
2011 FIFA Women's World Cup
8	2011-06-26	Berlin, Germany	Germany	2	90	0	1–2 L	Group stage
9	2011-06-30	Bochum, Germany	France	4	90	0	0–4 L	Group stage
2012 Women's Olympic Football Tournament
10	2012-07-25	Coventry, England	Japan	2	90	0	1–2 L	Group stage
11	2012-07-31	Newcastle, England	Sweden	2	90	0	2–2 D	Group stage
12	2012-08-03	Coventry, England	(United Kingdom) Great Britain	0	90	1	2–0 W	Quarter-final
13	2012-08-06	Manchester, England	(United States) USA	4	120	0	3–4 L	Semi-final
14	2012-08-09	Coventry, England	France	0	90	1	1–0 W	Bronze medal match
2015 FIFA Women's World Cup
15	2015-06-06	Edmonton, Canada	China	0	90	1	1–0 W	Group stage
16	2015-06-11	Edmonton, Canada	New Zealand	0	90	1	0–0 D	Group stage
17	2015-06-15	Montréal, Canada	Netherlands	1	90	0	1–1 D	Group stage
18	2015-06-21	Vancouver, Canada	Switzerland	0	90	1	1–0 W	Round of 16
19	2015-06-27	Vancouver, Canada	England	2	90	0	1–2 L	Quarter-final

== Honours ==
=== Vancouver Whitecaps ===
- W-League Championship: 2004, 2006

Canada

- Summer Olympics: 2021; bronze medal: 2012
- International Tournament of São Paulo: 2010
- Cyprus Cup: 2008, 2010, 2011

Individual

- All-WAC Tournament Team: 2001
- NSCAA Central All-Region Team: 2001, 2002
- All-WAC First-Team: 2001, 2002
- Academic All-WAC Team: 2002
- NSCAA All-American Third Team: 2004
- All-Mid Atlantic Region First team: 2004, 2005
- All-Big Ten First Team: 2004, 2005
- NSCAA All-American First Team: 2005
- ESPN The Magazine Academic All-American Third-Team: 2005
- Big Ten Defensive Player of the Year: 2005
- M.A.C. Hermann Trophy semi-finalist: 2005
- Canadian Soccer Association's All-Time Canada XI: 2012

== See also ==
- List of footballers with 100 or more caps
- List of Olympic medalists in football
- LGBT Olympians
- List of players who have appeared in multiple FIFA Women's World Cups
- List of Pennsylvania State University Olympians
