= Kollmats =

Kollmats is a surname. Notable people with the surname include:

- Beata Kollmats (born 1992), Swedish footballer
- Lennart Kollmats (1943–2025), Swedish politician
