= 2020–21 Svenska Cupen Damer =

Football tournament season

Tournament details
- Dates: 27 June 2020 – 13 May 2021
- Teams: 78

Final positions
- Champions: BK Häcken

Tournament statistics
- Matches played: 89
- Goals scored: 341 (3.83 per match)
- All statistics correct as of 13 May 2021.

The 2020–21 Svenska Cupen Damer was the 38th edition of the women's association football main cup competition in Sweden. BK Häcken won the competition after defeating Eskilstuna 3–0 at the final.

== Format ==
The format for this season changed a bit, 52 teams from the Division 1 and below entered the first round via their districts instead of 80. The winners will then join the Elitettan teams at the second round, while the Damallsvenskan teams join at the third round.

The qualification round starts from June and ends in February, after which the last 16 clubs would be grouped into 4 groups of 4 teams each.

== Calendar ==
Below are the dates for each round as given by the official schedule:

Round	Date(s)	Number of fixtures	Clubs
Qualification round
First round	27 June – 12 August 2020	26	52 → 26
Second round	26 August – 9 September 2020	20	40 → 20
Third round	30 September 2020 – 28 February 2021	16	32 → 16
Group stage
Matchday 1	13 & 14 March 2021	8	16 → 4
Matchday 2	19 – 21 March 2021	8	16 → 4
Matchday 3	27 March 2021	8	16 → 4
Knockout stage
Semi-finals	3 & 4 April 2021	2	4 → 2
Final	13 May 2021	1	2 → 1

== Qualification round ==
=== First round ===
52 teams from the Division 1 and lower entered this round via their districts qualifications. Matches were played between 27 June and 12 August 2020.

Team 1	Score	Team 2
27 June 2020
Älvsby IF	0–1	Luleå SK
26 July 2020
Ornäs BK	1–3	Västerås BK
Åsebro IF	0–7	Norrstrands IF
28 July 2020
Hertzöga BK	1–6	Örebro SK Söder
1 August 2020
Gamla Upsala SK	5–2	Tyresö FF
IF Centern	1–9	Eskilsminne IF
Umedalens IF	3–0	Kågedalens AIF
Ope IF	1–4	Själevads IK
P18 IK	0–2	Stuvsta IF
Mariebo IK	3–0	IK Gauthiod
Göteborgs DFF	5–2	Ulricehamns IFK
Lörby IF	1–3	Hammenhögs IF
3 August 2020
IK Rössö Uddevalla	8–2	Göteborgs FF
Götene FK	0–2	Skoftebyns IF
4 August 2020
Tranås FF	2–1	Smedby AIS
IF Team Hudik	0–2	Gefle IF
Mälarhöjdens IK	0–4	IFK Norrköping
Mjölby FC	0–2	Husqvarna FF
5 August 2020
Hittarps IK	2–1	Dösjöbro IF
11 August 2020
Östervåla IF	1–0	Avesta AIK
12 August 2020
IK Tun	3–4 (a.e.t.)	Älta IF
Valinge-Derome DFF	0–1	Qviding FIF
Emmaboda IS	1–8	IFÖ Bromölla IF
Hultsjö IF	1–5	Nittorps IK
Enskede IK	8–0	Sollentuna FK
Täby FK	4–3	Boo FF

=== Second round ===
The 26 winners from the first round plus the 14 Elitettan teams played in this round. Matches were played between 26 August and 9 September 2020.

Team 1	Score	Team 2
26 August 2020
Själevads IK	4–0	Umedalens IF
Göteborgs DFF	2–0	Nittorps IK
27 August 2020
Östervåla IF	4–2	Sandvikens IF
1 September 2020
IFÖ Bromölla IF	5–0	Hammenhögs IF
Sundsvalls DFF	3–0	Gefle IF
8 September 2020
Västerås BK	3–0	Kvarnsvedens IK
Husqvarna FF	0–4	Mariebo IK
Norrstrands IF	0–4	Mallbackens IF
Skoftebyns IF	1–9	Lidköpings FK
Stuvsta IF	0–2	Hammarby IF
Älta IF	2–3	IF Brommapojkarna
Enskede IK	2–3 (a.e.t.)	Älvsjö AIK (Note: The match between Enskede IK and Älvsjö AIK on 8 September was interrupted with 15 minutes left in extra time, the remainder of the match was completed on September 14.)
9 September 2020
Tranås FF	0–2	IFK Kalmar
Luleå SK	0–5	Morön BK
Eskilsminne IF	3–1	Hittarps IK
Örebro SK Söder	0–5	IFK Norrköping
IK Rössö Uddevalla	0–9	Alingsås IF
Qviding FIF	1–4	Jitex BK
Gamla Upsala SK	1–4	AIK
Täby FK	0–3	Bollstanäs SK

=== Third round ===
The 20 winners from the second round plus the 12 Damallsvenskan teams plays in this round. All matches are scheduled to take place between 30 September and 7 October 2020.

Team 1	Score	Team 2
30 September 2020
Mariebo IK	0–5	Vittsjö GIK
6 October 2020
Hammarby IF	2–0	Älvsjö AIK
Själevads IK	0–7	Umeå IK
7 October 2020
AIK	1–3	Djurgårdens IF
IFK Kalmar	1–3	Växjö DFF
IFÖ Bromölla IF	0–6	Kristianstads DFF
Jitex BK	0–7	Kopparbergs/Göteborg FC
Morön BK	4–3	Piteå IF
Bollstanäs SK	0–6	Eskilstuna DFF
Västerås BK	1–5	KIF Örebro DFF
Lidköpings FK	2–1	Mallbackens IF
Eskilsminne IF	2–3	FC Rosengård
Östervåla IF	2–3	Sundsvalls DFF
Göteborgs DFF	0–3	Alingsås IF
19 November 2020
IF Brommapojkarna	1–4 (a.e.t.)	IK Uppsala
28 February 2021
IFK Norrköping	0–3	Linköpings FC

== Group stage ==
The last 16 teams were divided into 4 groups of 4 teams each. All matches were played in March 2021.

=== Group A ===
Pos	Team	Pld	W	D	L	GF	GA	GD	Pts	Qualification
1	BK Häcken (Note: Kopparbergs/Göteborg FC is known as BK Häcken.) (Q)	3	3	0	0	14	3	+11	9	Advance to Semi-finals
2	Linköpings FC	3	2	0	1	6	5	+1	6	
3	Växjö DFF	3	1	0	2	4	2	+2	3	
4	Lidköpings FK	3	0	0	3	1	15	−14	0	

Source: Svensk Fotboll
(Q) Qualified
Notes:

Home \ Away	HAC	LID	LIN	VAX
BK Häcken	—	—	5–2	1–0
Lidköpings FK	1–8	—	0–3	—
Linköpings FC	—	—	—	1–0
Växjö DFF	—	4–0	—	—

Source: Svensk Fotboll

=== Group B ===
Pos	Team	Pld	W	D	L	GF	GA	GD	Pts	Qualification
1	FC Rosengård (Q)	3	2	1	0	13	4	+9	7	Advance to Semi-finals
2	Kristianstads DFF	3	2	1	0	9	4	+5	7	
3	Vittsjö GIK	3	1	0	2	3	5	−2	3	
4	Alingsås IF	3	0	0	3	0	0	0	0	

Source: Svensk Fotboll
(Q) Qualified

Home \ Away	ALI	KRI	ROS	VIT
Alingsås IF	—	0–4	0–7	—
Kristianstads DFF	—	—	—	2–1
FC Rosengård	—	3–3	—	3–1
Vittsjö GIK	1–0	—	—	—

Source: Svensk Fotboll

=== Group C ===
Pos	Team	Pld	W	D	L	GF	GA	GD	Pts	Qualification
1	Eskilstuna DFF (Q)	3	2	1	0	5	1	+4	7	Advance to Semi-finals
2	Hammarby IF	3	2	0	1	10	2	+8	6	
3	Örebro	3	1	1	1	7	4	+3	4	
4	Sundsvalls DFF	3	0	0	3	1	16	−15	0	

Source: Svensk Fotboll
(Q) Qualified

Home \ Away	ESK	HAM	ORE	SUN
Eskilstuna DFF	—	1–0	—	—
Hammarby IF	—	—	—	7–1
Örebro	1–1	0–3	—	—
Sundsvalls DFF	0–3	—	0–6	—

Source: Svensk Fotboll

=== Group D ===
Pos	Team	Pld	W	D	L	GF	GA	GD	Pts	Qualification
1	Umeå IK (Q)	3	3	0	0	10	2	+8	9	Advance to Semi-finals
2	Djurgårdens IF	3	2	0	1	11	4	+7	6	
3	Morön BK	3	1	0	2	3	10	−7	3	
4	IK Uppsala	3	0	0	3	1	9	−8	0	

Source: Svensk Fotboll
(Q) Qualified

Home \ Away	DJU	MOR	UME	UPP
Djurgårdens IF	—	—	2–3	4–0
Moròn BK	1–5	—	0–4	—
Umeå IK	—	—	—	3–0
IK Uppsala	—	1–2	—	—

Source: Svensk Fotboll

== Knockout stage ==
Semi-finals
3 April 2021
Umeå IK	2
Eskilstuna DFF	4
4 April 2021
BK Häcken	1
FC Rosengård	0

Final
13 May 2021
Eskilstuna DFF	0
BK Häcken	3

=== Semi-finals ===
3 April 2021
13:00

Umeå IK	2–4	Eskilstuna DFF
Rosita 36'; Sandström 90'	Report	Kullashi 26'; Collin 52'; Rogic 58' (pen.); Andersson 90+3'

Gammliavallen, Umeå
Attendance: 0
Referee: Sara Persson

4 April 2021
15:30

BK Häcken	1–0	FC Rosengård
Blackstenius 78'; Čanković (yellow card) 35' (yellow-red card) 90+4'	Report

Bravida Arena, Gothenburg
Attendance: 0
Referee: Pernilla Larsson

=== Final ===
13 May 2021
14:15

Eskilstuna	0–3	BK Häcken
	Report	Angeldal 56'; Blackstenius 70'; Hammarlund 87'

Bravida Arena, Gothenburg
Referee: Lovisa Johansson

== Top scorers ==
Not including qualifying. Updated to matches played on 4 April 2021.

Rank	Player	Club	Goals
1	(Sweden) Emilia Larsson	Hammarby	6
2	(Sweden) Stina Blackstenius	BK Häcken	5
3	(Sweden) Julia Zigiotti Olme	BK Häcken	4
4	(Serbia) Jelena Čanković	Rosengård	3
4	(Finland) Henna Honkanen	Umeå	3
4	(Sweden) Karin Lundin	Örebro	3
