= Skau =

Skau is a Norwegian and Danish habitational surname from several small places or farmsteads situated in or near a forest. Notable people with the surname include:

- Annie Skau Berntsen (1911–1992), Norwegian missionary
- Bjørn Skau (1929–2013), Norwegian politician
- Marie Skau (1890–1966), Norwegian politician
- Reidar Skau (1893–1975), Norwegian judge
- Tore Skau (born 1945), Norwegian former sports shooter

== See also ==
- Skog (surname)
