= Elin Rubensson =

Swedish footballer (born 1993)

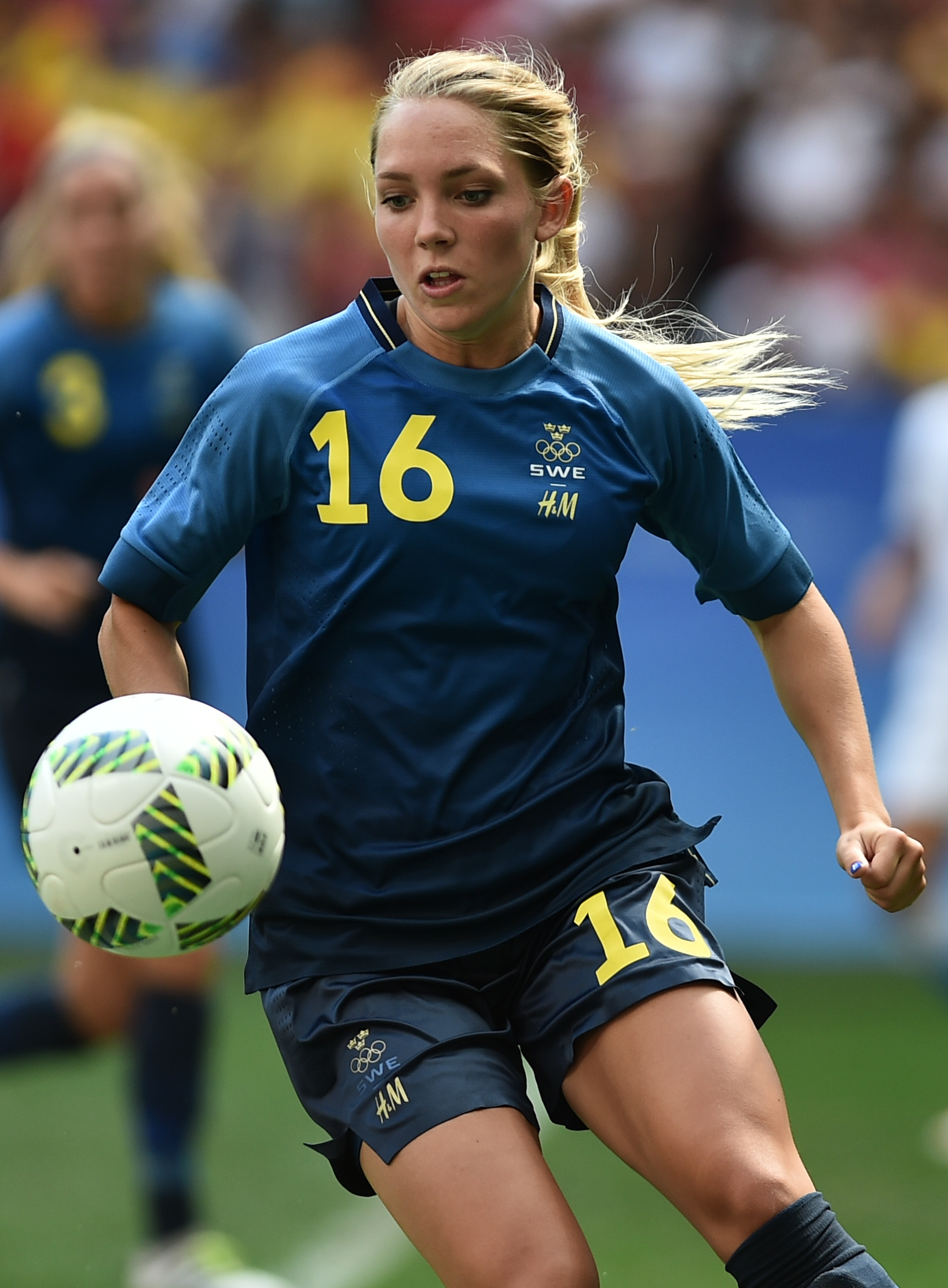
- Rubensson at the 2016 Olympics

Personal information
- Full name: Elin Ingrid Johanna Rubensson
- Date of birth: 11 May 1993 (age 33)
- Place of birth: Marieholm, Sweden
- Height: 1.66 m (5 ft 5 in)
- Positions: Central midfielder; right-back

Team information
- Current team: BK Häcken
- Number: 23

Youth career
- Marieholms IS
- 2008–2009: Stehags IF

Senior career*
Years	Team	Apps	(Gls)
2010–2013	LdB FC Malmö	52	(11)
2014	FC Rosengård	15	(2)
2015–2020	Kopparbergs/Göteborg	97	(27)
2021–2024	BK Häcken	60	(12)
2024	Houston Dash	15	(0)
2025–	BK Häcken	3	(0)

International career^{‡}
2008–2010	Sweden U17	22	(24)
2011–2012	Sweden U19	26	(24)
2011–2013	Sweden U23	5	(0)
2012–	Sweden	81	(4)
Medal record
Women's soccer
Representing Sweden
Olympic Games
Silver medal – second place	2016 Rio de Janeiro	Team
FIFA Women's World Cup
Bronze medal – third place	2019 France	Team
- * Club domestic league appearances and goals as of 1 May 2026 ‡ National team caps and goals as of 17:57, 2 August 2023 (UTC)

Elin Ingrid Johanna Rubensson (born 11 May 1993) is a Swedish professional footballer who plays as a midfielder for Damallsvenskan club BK Häcken and the Swedish national team. She was part of and played an important role for Sweden at the Under 19 Championship in 2012. Between 2008 and 2012, Rubensson scored nearly 50 goals for the Sweden U17 and U19 youth national teams. She also played for the Houston Dash of the National Women's Soccer League (NWSL).

== Club career ==
Rubensson started playing football at Marieholms IS. From 2010 she played for Malmö FF in the Damallsvenskan, with which she became champion in 2010, 2011, 2013, and 2014 and won the 2012 Supercup. She also took the team to the Champions League four times, with the best showing being reaching the quarter-finals in 2011/12 and 2012/13. In May 2013 Malmö converted Rubensson from a forward to a left back.

She left champions Malmö (who had become known as FC Rosengård) in December 2014, to sign a two-year contract with Kopparbergs/Göteborg FC. They finished second in the 2018 season, meaning the team qualified for the 2019–20 Champions League. After a 1–2 home defeat against Bayern Munich, in which she scored the goal for her team, they won 1–0 in Munich, but the away goals rule was against the Swedes.

On 4 August 2018 she signed a 5-year contract extension with Kopparbergs/Göteborg FC.

On 1 May 2019 she won the cup with Kopparbergs/Göteborg FC, scoring the 2–1 winning goal from a penalty in the first minute of stoppage time. On 29 September 2019 she suffered a head injury during the league game against Vittsjö GIK.

She played at the start of the 2021 season, also due to the subsequent pregnancy and parental leave. By then she was a regular player again at the club, which is now named BK Häcken.

In the 2021–22 Champions League, she reached the group stage for the first time after two wins in the qualifying final against Vålerenga Oslo. Here they won the away game against Benfica Lisbon 1–0. The other games were lost, so they were eliminated as bottom of the group. Rubensson played in all games and also scored the goal for her team from a penalty in the 1–2 home defeat against Benfica. She and her club failed to qualify for the group stage of the 2022–23 Champions League against Paris Saint-Germain.

In 2024, Rubensson signed with the Houston Dash in the NWSL. The club announced her departure on 6 December 2024.

== International career ==
She scored 24 goals in 22 games for the Sweden U17 team. She achieved the same number for the U19 team, with whom she won the 2012 U19 European Championship, where she was top scorer with five goals and was voted "Golden Player" by UEFA.

Rubensson made her debut for the Swedish national team in October 2012. She was named to Sweden's squad for the 2015 World Cup and appeared in all four matches. Rubensson appeared in all six matches for Sweden at the 2016 Summer Olympics and won the Silver Medal.

In July 2017 Rubensson was named to the Sweden roster for the Euro 2017, she appeared in two matches as Sweden lost to the Netherlands in the Quarterfinals.

She won the 2019 Algarve Cup with her team. As part of qualifying for the 2019 World Cup, she scored her first international goal in a 4–0 win against Croatia, making it 2–0. She scored in the 5–1 win over Thailand at the 2019 World Cup. She was used in five World Cup games, in the starting line-up each time.

In Sweden's successful qualification for the 2022 European Championship, she played once in the first game. Due to injury and the subsequent pregnancy and birth of her son, she was nominated again for the World Cup qualification in September 2021, but was not used. She was used again in the friendly match against Scotland on 26 October 2021, 784 days after her last international match.

At the 2022 Euro, she played in the 5–0 win in the final group game against Portugal. With a 4–0 defeat against hosts England, the Swedes were eliminated in the semi-finals.

After the Euro, she was used in the last game of qualifying for the World Cup 2023. The Swedes were the first European team to qualify in April 2022.

On 13 June 2023, Rubensson was included in the 23-player squad for the World Cup. She played in all seven of her team's games and was defeated 1–2 in the semi-finals against Spain. She won the bronze medal with a 2–0 victory in the game for third place over Australia. She scored one goal during the tournament from a penalty to make it 2–0 in the final group game against Argentina.

== Personal life ==
Rubensson has two siblings, Jacob and Cajsa. Cajsa is also a footballer and plays for the youth teams of Sweden and FC Rosengård. In 2018, Rubensson married fellow footballer Filip Stenström, who took her surname afterwards. The couple have a son, Frans, born in 2020. Rubensson is also a certified interior designer.

== Career statistics ==
=== International ===
Scores and results list Sweden's goal tally first, score column indicates score after each Rubensson goal.

List of international goals scored by Elin Rubensson
No.	Date	Venue	Opponent	Score	Result	Competition	Ref.
1	7 June 2018	Gothenburg, Sweden	Croatia	2–0	4–0	2019 World Cup qualification	
2	30 August 2018	Gothenburg, Sweden	Ukraine	1–0	3–0	2019 World Cup qualification	
3	16 June 2019	Nice, France	Thailand	5–1	5–1	2019 FIFA Women's World Cup	
4	2 August 2023	Hamilton, New Zealand	Argentina	2–0	2–0	2023 FIFA Women's World Cup	

== Honours ==
LdB FC Malmö / FC Rosengård

- Damallsvenskan: 2010, 2011, 2013, 2014
- Svenska Supercupen: 2011, 2012

Kopparbergs/Göteborg FC / BK Häcken

- Damallsvenskan: 2020, 2025
- UEFA Women's Europa Cup: 2025–26

Sweden U19

- UEFA Women's Under-19 Championship: 2012

Sweden

- FIFA Women's World Cup third place: 2019, 2023
- Summer Olympic Games Silver Medal: 2016
- Algarve Cup: 2018

Individual

- Fotbollsgalan Diamantbollen: 2023
