= Skog (disambiguation) =

Skog means "forest" in Norwegian and Swedish and is the name of Norwegian rock band. It may also refer to:

- Skog (surname)
- Skog, Sweden, a former municipality in Sweden
- AT Skog, a regional forestry organisation in Norway
- Djungelskog, a plush toy manufactured by IKEA
- Island of the Skog, a children's book by Stephen Kellogg
- Norske Skog, Norwegian pulp and paper company
