= 2011 Damallsvenskan =

Damallsvenskan
- Season: 2011
- Champions: LdB Malmö
- UEFA Women's Champions League: LdB Malmö, Kopparbergs/Göteborg
- Top goalscorer: Manon Melis; Margrét Lára Viðarsdóttir (16 goals)
- Biggest home win: Tyresö 8–1 Hammarby
- Biggest away win: Dalsjöfors 0–9 Jitex

The 2011 Damallsvenskan was the 39th edition of the premier women's football championship in Sweden, and the 24th season of the Damallsvenskan era. Contested by twelve teams, it ran from 9 April to 15 October 2011. Defending champion LdB FC Malmö won its sixth title with a one-point advantage over Kopparbergs/Göteborg FC, which also repeated as the runner-up, qualifying too for the 2012–13 UEFA Women's Champions League. Umeå IK, Tyresö FF and KIF Örebro followed in the table within a ten points distance. On the other hand, 1985 champion Hammarby IF and newly promoted Dalsjöfors GoIF were relegated as the two bottom teams. With 16 goals Malmö's Manon Melis's repeated as the season's top scorer, ex-aequo with 7th-placed Kristianstads DFF's Margrét Lára Viðarsdóttir.

== Table ==
Pos	Team	Pld	W	D	L	GF	GA	GD	Pts	Qualification or relegation
1	LdB Malmö FC (C, Q)	22	15	4	3	52	19	+33	49	Qualification to Champions League Round of 32
2	Kopparbergs/Göteborg FC (Q)	22	15	3	4	50	13	+37	48	Qualification to Champions League Round of 32
3	Umeå IK	22	13	5	4	45	21	+24	44	
4	Tyresö FF	22	13	4	5	49	20	+29	43	
5	KIF Örebro	22	11	6	5	39	28	+11	39	
6	Linköping FC	22	9	8	5	30	22	+8	35	
7	Kristianstads DFF	22	10	4	8	37	27	+10	34	
8	Djurgårdens IF	22	8	1	13	22	42	−20	25	
9	Jitex BK	22	5	4	13	32	43	−11	19	
10	Piteå IF	22	4	5	13	22	44	−22	17	
11	Hammarby IF (R)	22	1	5	16	7	52	−45	8	Relegation to First Division
12	Dalsjöfors GoIF (R)	22	1	5	16	9	63	−54	8	Relegation to First Division

Rules for classification: 1) Points; 2) Goal difference; 3) Number of goals scored
(C) Champions; (Q) Qualified for the phase indicated; (R) Relegated

== Results ==
Home \ Away	MAL	GÖT	UME	TYR	ÖRE	LIN	KRI	DJU	JIT	PIT	HAM	DAL
LdB Malmö		1–1	1–1	3–5	6–0	3–1	2–1	4–0	5–0	2–0	3–1	5–0
Kopparbergs/Göteborg	1–0		0–1	0–0	3–1	2–0	3–2	3–0	3–1	6–0	6–0	5–0
Umeå	1–1	1–2		0–2	0–1	1–1	3–1	2–1	2–0	2–2	4–0	4–0
Tyresö	1–2	1–4	1–3		2–1	1–1	1–1	3–0	4–0	2–0	8–1	3–0
Örebro	1–1	3–1	1–2	1–0		2–1	1–1	4–0	2–2	0–0	2–1	1–1
Linköping	2–0	0–0	2–2	1–4	0–2		3–1	1–0	3–1	1–1	5–0	0–0
Kristianstad	0–1	1–0	2–1	1–0	4–2	0–0		3–1	1–1	0–2	3–0	5–1
Djurgården	1–2	1–0	0–5	0–3	1–3	1–2	2–0		2–1	3–2	1–0	4–1
Jitex	1–3	0–1	1–3	1–2	0–4	1–2	1–2	2–0		3–0	0–0	3–2
Piteå	1–4	0–3	1–3	0–2	1–1	0–3	1–3	0–2	1–1		2–1	5–0
Hammarby	0–1	0–5	0–2	0–0	0–3	0–0	1–0	1–2	1–3	0–2		0–0
Dalsjöfors	0–2	0–1	1–2	0–4	1–3	0–1	0–5	0–0	0–9	2–1	0–0	

Legend: Blue = home team win; Yellow = draw; Red = away team win.

== Season statistics ==
=== Top scorers ===
Rank	Player	Club	Goals
1	(Netherlands) Manon Melis	LdB FC Malmö	16
1	(Iceland) Margrét Lára Viðarsdóttir	Kristianstads DFF	16
3	(Sweden) Madeleine Edlund	Tyresö FF	15
4	(Sweden) Sara Lindén	Kopparbergs/Göteborg	14
5	(Switzerland) Ramona Bachmann	Umeå IK	13
6	(Iceland) Sara Björk Gunnarsdóttir	LdB FC Malmö	12
6	(Sweden) Linnea Liljegärd	Kopparbergs/Göteborg	12
6	(Finland) Annica Sjölund	Jitex BK	12
9	(Finland) Sanna Talonen	Örebro	10
10	(Sweden) Mia Jalkerud	Djurgården	9
10	(Sweden) Fridolina Rolfö	Jitex BK	9

=== Top assists ===
Rank	Player	Club	Assists
1	(Sweden) Johanna Almgren	Kopparbergs/Göteborg	9
2	(Sweden) Linnea Liljegärd	Kopparbergs/Göteborg	7
2	(Sweden) Josefine Öqvist	Tyresö FF	7
2	(Sweden) Annica Svensson	Tyresö FF	7
5	(Sweden) Elin Magnusson	KIF Örebro DFF	6
5	(Nigeria) Sarah Michael	KIF Örebro DFF	6
7	(Netherlands) Manon Melis	LdB FC Malmö	5
7	(Denmark) Johanna Rasmussen	Kristianstads DFF	5
7	(Sweden) Elin Rubensson	LdB FC Malmö	5
7	(Sweden) Sofia Skog	Jitex BK	5
7	(Iceland) Margrét Lára Viðarsdóttir	Kristianstads DFF	5
