= Skog (surname) =

Skog is a surname that may refer to

- Cecilie Skog (born 1974), Norwegian adventurer
- Emil Skog (1897–1981), Finnish telephone worker, civil servant and politician
- Harald Skog (born 1949), Norwegian Olympic boxer
- Jan Erik Skog (born 1945), Norwegian electrician, trade unionist and whistleblower
- Karin Lamberg-Skog (born 1961), Swedish cross-country skier
- Laurence Skog (born 1943), American botanist
- Netta Skog (born 1989–1990), Finnish accordionist
- Nils Skog (1877–1964), Swedish sports shooter
- Richard Skog, Norwegian strongman competitor
- Sofia Skog (born 1988), Swedish association football player
- Wea Skog (born 1938), South African cricketer

== See also ==
- Skog (disambiguation)
