= Stina Blackstenius =

Swedish footballer (born 1996)

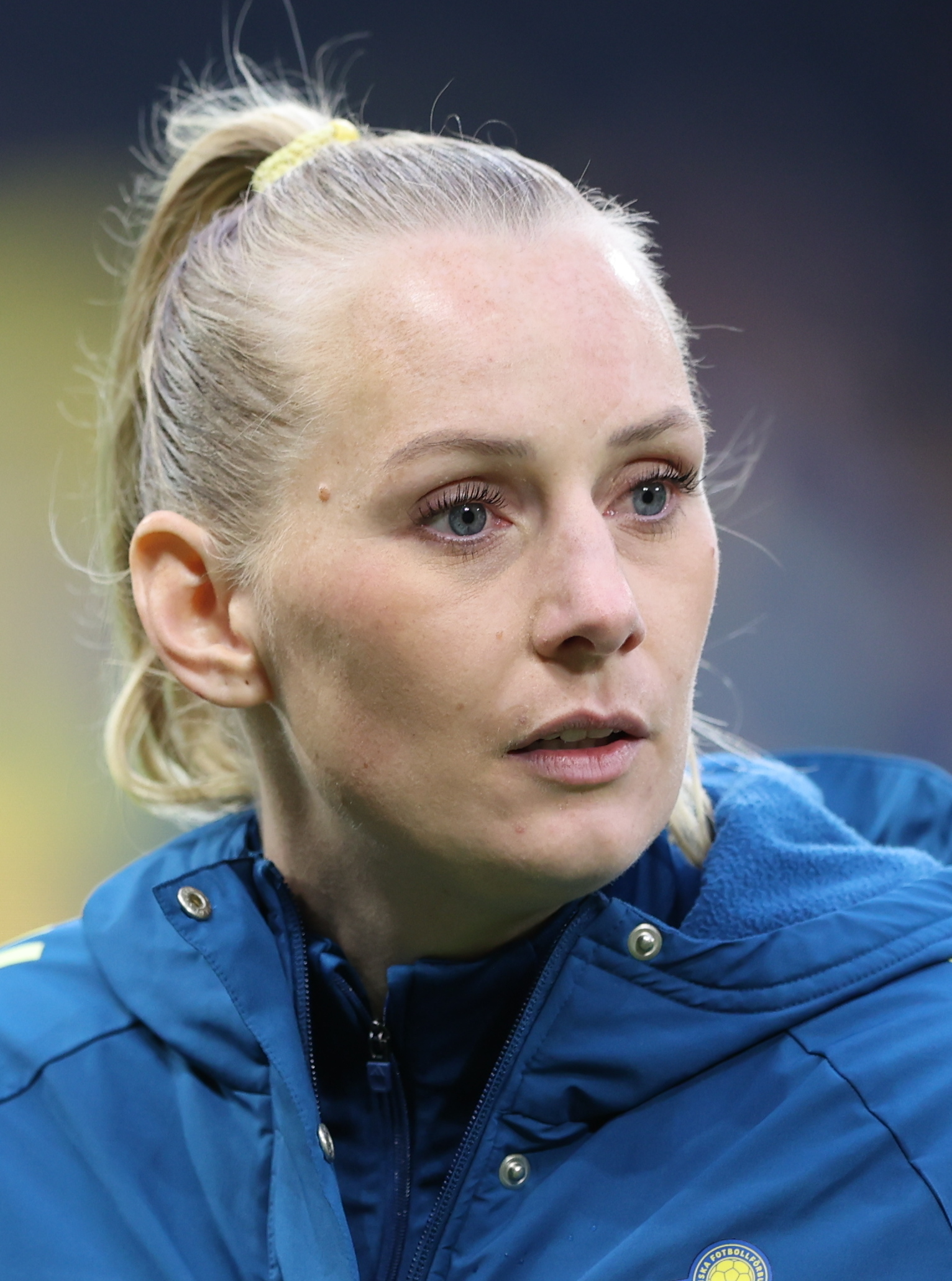
- Blackstenius with Sweden in 2026

Personal information
- Full name: Emma Stina Blackstenius
- Date of birth: 5 February 1996 (age 30)
- Place of birth: Vadstena, Sweden
- Height: 1.74 m (5 ft 9 in)
- Position: Striker

Team information
- Current team: Arsenal
- Number: 25

Youth career
- 2002–2011: Vadstena GIF

Senior career*
Years	Team	Apps	(Gls)
2011–2012	Vadstena GIF	34	(59)
2013–2016	Linköping	78	(37)
2017–2019	Montpellier	43	(25)
2019–2020	Linköping	22	(9)
2020–2021	BK Häcken	40	(25)
2022–	Arsenal	99	(36)

International career^{‡}
2012–2013	Sweden U17	16	(11)
2013–2015	Sweden U19	29	(34)
2016	Sweden U20	4	(5)
2015–	Sweden	132	(48)
Medal record
Representing Sweden
Olympic Games
Silver medal – second place	2016 Rio de Janeiro
Silver medal – second place	2020 Tokyo
FIFA Women's World Cup
Third place	2019 France
Third place	2023 Australia/New Zealand
- * Club domestic league appearances and goals as of 1 November 2026 ‡ National team caps and goals as of 14 October 2026

Emma Stina Blackstenius (Swedish: [ˈstîːna blakˈstěːnɪɵs]; born 5 February 1996) is a Swedish professional footballer who plays as a forward for Arsenal in the English Women's Super League and the Sweden national team.

== Club career ==
=== Vadstena ===
Blackstenius grew up in Vadstena and joined local club Vadstena GIF in 2002 at the age of 6. On 20 April 2011, Blackstenius made her senior debut for the club against BK Kenty in the Östergötland region Division 3, the fifth tier of women's football in Sweden. She started the match and scored twice as Vadstena lost 5–4. In her debut season, Blackstenius started all 18 leagues games and scored 21 goals. She played 16 games the following season and finished as the league's top scorer with 38 goals. She was named 2012 Östergötland player of the year.

=== Linköping ===
Prior to the start of the 2013 season, Blackstenius signed a three-year contract with Linköping FC of the top-flight Damallsvenskan. She made her Damallsvenskan debut as a 68th-minute substitute on 17 April 2013 in a 1–1 draw with Kopparbergs/Göteborg FC. She scored her first top-flight goal on 28 May 2013, in a 3–1 victory over Malmö FF. On 31 July 2013, Blackstenius played her first Svenska Cupen match for the club, scoring a hattrick during a 13–0 win against Landsbro IF. Having appeared in 9 of the first 11 league games of the season all as a substitute, Blackstenius was given a bigger role towards the end of the season. She started all of the 11 remaining league games and went on a run of scoring six goals in the final five games as Linköping finished third. Linköping reached the 2013–14 Swedish Cup final. They beat Kristianstads DFF 2–1 with Blackstenius appearing as a 62nd-minute substitute. In October 2014, Blackstenius made her UEFA Champions League debut away to English Super League side Liverpool. Linköping lost the first leg 2–1 but won 3–0 at home to progress. At the Fotbollsgalan 2015 awards, Blackstenius was named Breakthrough Player of the Year. In 2016, Linköping won the 2016 Damallsvenskan title. Blackstenius was the second-highest scorer in the league with 19 goals behind teammate Pernille Harder.

=== Montpellier ===
In January 2017, Blackstenius signed a two-and-a-half-year deal with French Division 1 Féminine club Montpellier HSC. She made her debut on 4 January 2017, entering as a halftime substitute against Paris Saint-Germain and scored the 81st-minute winner in the 2–1 victory. On 19 February 2017, she scored four goals in a Coupe de France 16–0 win over fourth division side FC Domont. Joining halfway through the 2016–17 season, Blackstenius helped Montpellier to finish second in the league behind Lyon, scoring seven goals in 11 league games. The following season, Blackstenius finished as the fourth-highest scorer in the league with 12 goals in 20 games as Montpellier finished third. Blackstenius fell out of favour at the start of the 2018–19 season, only starting in six of 12 appearances, and opted to leave in January 2019.

=== Return to Linköping ===
On 30 January 2019, Blackstenius returned to Sweden, signing a two-year contract with her former club Linköpings FC. She made her second debut in a 5–0 win over Växjö DFF in the Damallsvenskan. The team finished fifth with Blackstenius scoring nine goals.

=== BK Häcken ===
Ahead of the 2020 season, Blackstenius moved to Kopparbergs/Göteborg FC (later rebranded BK Häcken). A dispute between Linköping and Göteborg in regard to the transfer had to be settled by the Swedish Football Association's arbitration committee with neither party wishing to comment on the nature of the dispute. In her debut season with the club, Göteborg won the 2020 Damallsvenskan. On 4 April 2021, Blackstenius scored the only goal in a 2020–21 Svenska Cupen semi-final win over FC Rosengård before scoring again in the final as BK Häcken beat Eskilstuna United 3–0. In the 2021 season, Häcken finished second behind Rosengård. Blackstenius led the league in both goals (17) and assists (8). In November 2021, she was named to the 20-player Ballon d'Or shortlist. Blackstenius left the club upon the expiry of her contract at the end of the 2021 season.

=== Arsenal ===
On 14 January 2022, English Super League club Arsenal confirmed the signing of Blackstenius on a free transfer. She made her debut five days later, as a 69th-minute substitute for Vivianne Miedema in a 1–0 defeat at home to Manchester United in the League Cup quarter-finals. She scored her first goal for Arsenal on 5 February 2022 against Manchester United, tying the game 1–1 in the 78th minute. In the 2022–23 Conti Cup final against Chelsea, Blackstenius scored a goal making it 1–1 in the eventual 3–1 win for Arsenal. She scored a hat trick against Reading in the 2023–24 Conti Cup. She scored a first-half hat trick in the 4–0 win against Aston Villa in the 2023–24 Conti Cup semifinal. In the final, she scored the game-winning goal in the 116th minute of overtime, beating Chelsea 1–0 to lift the trophy. In the away match against Manchester City, Arsenal were down by one until Blackstenius scored in the 89th and 92nd minute, beating City away from home for the first time in seven years.

On 24 May 2025, Blackstenius was introduced as a 67th minute substitute in the 2025 UEFA Champions League final against Barcelona. In the 74th minute, she scored the only goal of the match, winning Arsenal their second Champions League title.

On 21 April 2026, it was announced that Blackstenius had signed a two-year contract to extend her time with Arsenal.

== International career ==
=== Youth ===
On 30 October 2012, Blackstenius made her Sweden under-17 debut during 2013 UEFA Under-17 Championship qualification, scoring a hattrick in a 9–0 win over Croatia. As an under-19 international, Blackstenius featured prominently at the 2015 UEFA Under-19 Championship. She finished as tournament's top goalscorer after scoring six goals for the victorious Swedish team, including two in the 3–1 final win over Spain. In total she scored 50 goals in 49 appearances while representing Sweden at various youth age groups.

=== Senior ===
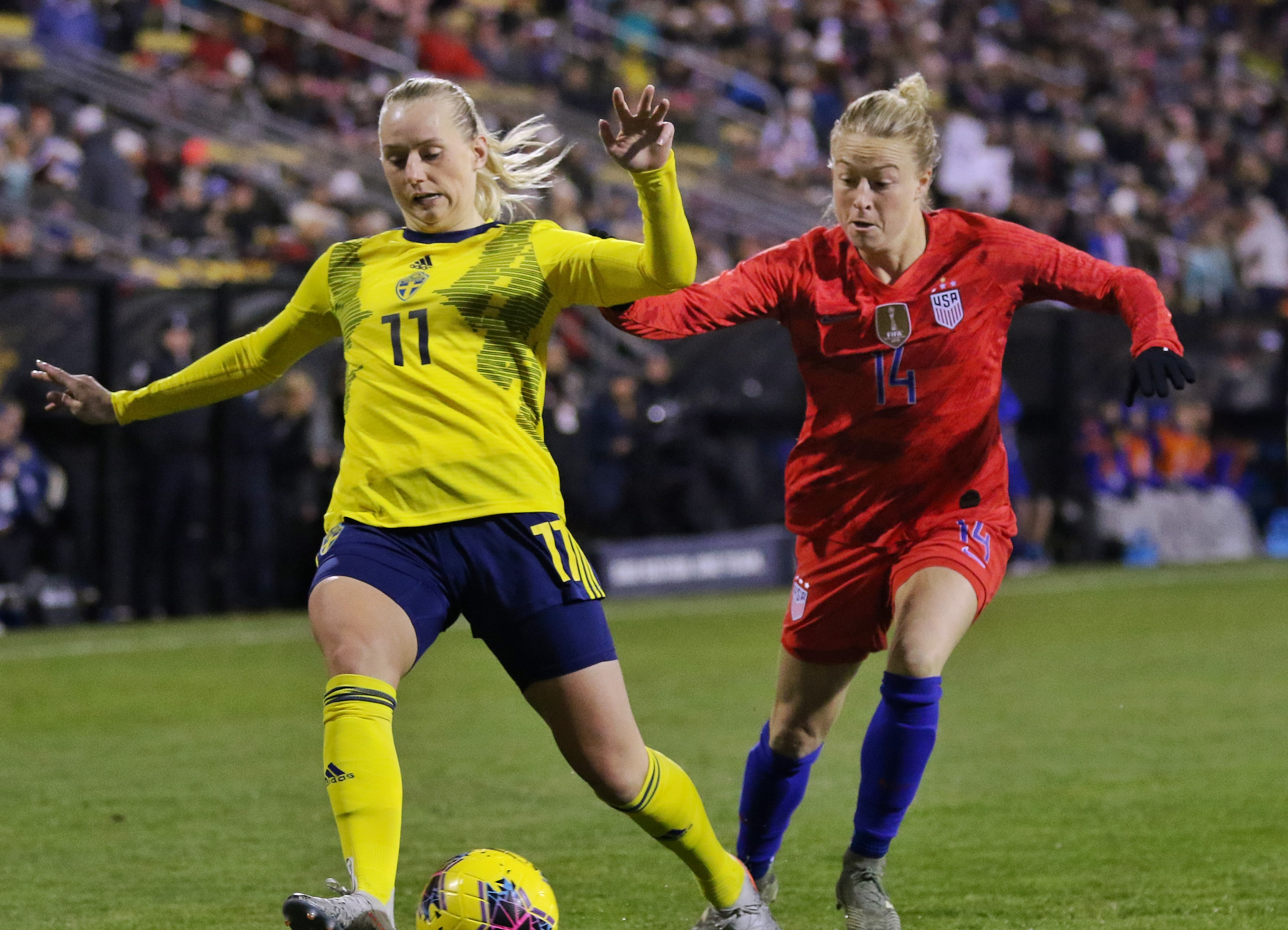
Blackstenius playing for Sweden in a match against the United States on 7 November 2019.

Blackstenius made her senior Sweden national team debut as a 79th-minute substitute in a 1–0 UEFA Euro 2017 qualifying win over Denmark on 27 October 2015, at Gamla Ullevi. On 8 April 2016, she scored her first senior international goal on her fifth appearance, the third goal in Sweden's 3–0 win over Slovakia in Poprad during UEFA Euro 2017 qualifying.

In June 2016, Blackstenius was named in the Sweden squad for the 2016 Summer Olympics. Having appeared as a substitute against South Africa in the opening group match, Blackstenius was an unused substitute for the next two as Sweden progressed as one of the two best-ranked third place teams. In the quarter-final against the reigning World Cup and Olympic champions United States, she came off the bench to replace the injured Fridolina Rolfö in the 18th minute and scored in the second half to give Sweden a lead. With the game tied at 1–1, Sweden progressed following a penalty shoot-out. Coming on again as a substitute in the Gold Medal match, Blackstenius scored in the 67th minute to pull Sweden within one score of Germany. The game finished 2–1 with Sweden winning the silver medal.

The following summer, Blackstenius was called up to the squad for Euro 2017. She scored in consecutive group games against Russia and Italy before Sweden were knocked out at the quarter-final stage by host nation Netherlands.

Having helped helping Sweden qualify for the 2019 FIFA World Cup with three goals, second on the team behind Kosovare Asllani, Blackstenius was selected in the final squad to travel to France. She made her World Cup debut starting the first game, a 2–0 win over Chile. She scored her first World Cup goal in the round of 16, the only goal in a 1–0 win over Canada. She scored another game winniner in the following match, a 2–1 quarter-final win over Germany, Sweden's first win against Germany in a major tournament since the 1995 World Cup. They lost the semi-final to Netherlands before winning the third-place match against England.

In July 2021, Blackstenius was named to her second successive Olympics for the delayed 2020 Tokyo games. Sweden repeated their silver medal run with Blackstenius having her most successful tournament to date, leading the team in goals with five. She scored three goals during the group stage: a brace during a 3–0 win over the United States in the opening group game and another against Australia. In the knockout stage, she scored the go-ahead goal in a 3–1 quarter-final win over hosts Japan before again netting in an Olympic gold medal match, this time to give Sweden the lead over Canada. She was substituted in the 106th minute during extra-time with Canada eventually winning the gold medal on penalties 3–2 as four of Sweden's six penalty takers were unsuccessful. Combined with her goals at Rio 2016, Blackstenius' seven Olympic goals surpassed the previous Swedish record of six in the competition set by Lotta Schelin.

In June 2022, Blackstenius was named to the squad for Euro 2022. Despite injury concerns, she was fit enough to be named on the bench for the team's opening group stage game against Netherlands and appeared as a 68th-minute substitute in the 1–1 draw. She started all four remaining matches, scoring one goal during a 5–0 victory over Portugal, before Sweden were eliminated by hosts England at the semi-final stage 4–0.

On 13 June 2023, she was included in the 23-player squad for the 2023 World Cup. She scored in Sweden's 5–0 win over Italy.

She got her first hat-trick for Sweden on 3 June 2025 in a 6-1 victory over Denmark in the 2024-25 UEFA Women's Nations League group stages.

== Personal life ==
Blackstenius is the daughter of Magnus Blackstenius and Lena Wiberg. She has an older brother, Oscar, and her younger half-sister is Sweden international handball player Nina Koppang. Blackstenius also grew up playing handball and did so competitively until 2013. Blackstenius studied economics at Kungshögaskolan in Mjölby.

Her last name, Blackstenius, comes from her father's family. He lived on a farm called "Blacksta", and her grandfather's name was "Sten". She, her father, and her brother are the only ones who have that name in Sweden.

== Career statistics ==
=== Club ===
As of match played 1 November 2026

Appearances and goals by club, season and competition
Club	Season	League			National cup (Note: Svenska Cupen and Coupe de France)		League cup (Note: FA Women's League Cup)		Continental (Note: Champions League)		Other		Total	
Club	Season	Division	Apps	Goals	Apps	Goals	Apps	Goals	Apps	Goals	Apps	Goals	Apps	Goals
Vadstena GIF	2011	Division 3	18	21	?	?	—		—		—		18	21
Vadstena GIF	2012	Division 3	16	38	?	?	—		—		—		16	38
Vadstena GIF	Total		34	59	?	?	0	0	0	0	0	0	34	59
Linköping	2013	Damallsvenskan	20	8	6	7	—		—		—		26	15
Linköping	2014	Damallsvenskan	17	3	5	4	—		2	0	—		24	7
Linköping	2015	Damallsvenskan	19	7	5	3	—		2	0	—		26	10
Linköping	2016	Damallsvenskan	22	19	2	5	—		—		—		24	24
Linköping	Total		78	37	18	19	0	0	4	0	0	0	100	56
Montpellier	2016–17	D1 Féminine	11	7	3	4	—		—		—		14	11
Montpellier	2017–18	D1 Féminine	20	12	3	1	—		6	1	—		29	14
Montpellier	2018–19	D1 Féminine	12	6	1	0	—		—		—		13	6
Montpellier	Total		43	25	7	5	0	0	6	1	0	0	56	31
Linköping	2019	Damallsvenskan	22	9	3	1	—		—		—		25	10
BK Häcken	2020	Damallsvenskan	19	8	1	3	—		2	0	—		22	11
BK Häcken	2021	Damallsvenskan	21	17	5	6	—		7	4	—		33	27
BK Häcken	Total		40	25	6	9	0	0	9	4	0	0	55	38
Arsenal	2021–22	WSL	11	6	2	1	1	0	2	0	—		16	7
Arsenal	2022–23	WSL	22	8	2	2	3	2	12	6	—		39	18
Arsenal	2023–24	WSL	19	7	2	1	6	9	2	1	—		29	18
Arsenal	2024–25	WSL	19	5	3	3	2	0	15	2	—		39	10
Arsenal	2025–26	WSL	20	10	3	1	2	1	10	1	2 (Note: Appearance(s) in FIFA Women's Champions Cup)	1	37	14
Arsenal	2026–27	WSL	8	0	0	0	—		3	0	—		11	0
Arsenal	Total		99	36	12	8	14	12	44	10	2	1	171	67
Career total			316	191	46	42	14	12	63	15	2	1	441	261

=== International ===
As of match played 13 October 2026

Appearances and goals by national team and year
National team	Year	Apps	Goals
Sweden	2015	1	0
Sweden	2016	12	3
Sweden	2017	17	2
Sweden	2018	10	5
Sweden	2019	14	4
Sweden	2020	4	0
Sweden	2021	14	8
Sweden	2022	14	6
Sweden	2023	17	2
Sweden	2024	8	5
Sweden	2025	14	8
Sweden	2026	7	7
Total		132	47

As of match played 13 October 2026
Scores and results list Sweden's goal tally first, score column indicates score after each Blackstenius goal.

List of international goals scored by Stina Blackstenius
No.	Date	Cap	Venue	Opponent	Score	Result	Competition
1	8 April 2016	5	NTC Poprad, Poprad, Slovakia	Slovakia	3–0	3–0	UEFA Euro 2017 qualifying
2	12 August 2016	10	Mané Garrincha, Brasília, Brazil	United States	1–0	1–1 (4–3 p)	2016 Summer Olympics
3	19 August 2016	12	Maracanã, Rio de Janeiro, Brazil	Germany	1–2	1–2	2016 Summer Olympics
4	21 July 2017	25	De Adelaarshorst, Deventer, Netherlands	Russia	2–0	2–0	UEFA Euro 2017
5	25 July 2017	26	De Vijverberg, Doetinchem, Netherlands	Italy	2–2	2–3	UEFA Euro 2017
6	28 February 2018	32	Estádio Municipal Bela Vista, Parchal, Portugal	Canada	3–1	3–1	2018 Algarve Cup
7	2 March 2018	33	Estádio Municipal Bela Vista, Parchal, Portugal	South Korea	1–0	1–1	2018 Algarve Cup
8	5 April 2018	34	Haladás Sportkomplexum, Szombathely, Hungary	Hungary	3–1	4–1	2019 FIFA World Cup qualification
9	7 June 2018	35	Gamla Ullevi, Gothenburg, Sweden	Croatia	1–0	4–0	2019 FIFA World Cup qualification
10	7 June 2018	35	Gamla Ullevi, Gothenburg, Sweden	Croatia	3–0	4–0	2019 FIFA World Cup qualification
11	24 June 2019	47	Parc des Princes, Paris, France	Canada	1–0	1–0	2019 FIFA World Cup
12	29 June 2019	48	Roazhon Park, Rennes, France	Germany	2–1	2–1	2019 FIFA World Cup
13	8 October 2019	53	Gamla Ullevi, Gothenburg, Sweden	Slovakia	5–0	7–0	UEFA Euro 2022 qualifying
14	8 October 2019	53	Gamla Ullevi, Gothenburg, Sweden	Slovakia	6–0	7–0	UEFA Euro 2022 qualifying
15	13 April 2021	62	Stadion Widzewa, Łódź, Poland	Poland	1–1	4–2	Friendly
16	13 April 2021	62	Stadion Widzewa, Łódź, Poland	Poland	2–1	4–2	Friendly
17	10 June 2021	63	Guldfågeln Arena, Kalmar, Sweden	Norway	1–0	1–0	Friendly
18	21 July 2021	65	Tokyo Stadium, Chōfu, Japan	United States	1–0	3–0	2020 Summer Olympics
19	21 July 2021	65	Tokyo Stadium, Chōfu, Japan	United States	2–0	3–0	2020 Summer Olympics
20	24 July 2021	66	Saitama Stadium, Saitama, Japan	Australia	4–2	4–2	2020 Summer Olympics
21	30 July 2021	67	Saitama Stadium, Saitama, Japan	Japan	2–1	3–1	2020 Summer Olympics
22	6 August 2021	69	International Stadium Yokohama, Yokohama, Japan	Canada	1–0	1–1 (2–3 p)	2020 Summer Olympics
23	20 February 2022	73	Estádio Algarve, Algarve, Portugal	Portugal	4–0	4–0	2022 Algarve Cup
24	7 April 2022	75	Tengiz Burjanadze Stadium, Gori, Georgia	Georgia	3–0	15–0	2023 FIFA World Cup qualification
25	7 April 2022	75	Tengiz Burjanadze Stadium, Gori, Georgia	Georgia	5–0	15–0	2023 FIFA World Cup qualification
26	28 June 2022	77	Nationalarenan, Stockholm, Sweden	Brazil	3–1	3–1	Friendly
27	17 July 2022	80	Leigh Sports Village, Manchester, England	Portugal	5–0	5–0	UEFA Euro 2022
28	6 September 2022	83	Tampere Stadium, Tampere, Finland	Finland	1–0	5–0	2023 FIFA World Cup qualification
29	29 July 2023	92	Wellington Regional Stadium, Wellington, New Zealand	Italy	3–0	5–0	2023 FIFA World Cup
30	5 December 2023	103	La Rosaleda Stadium, Málaga, Spain	Spain	3–1	3–5	2023–24 UEFA Nations League
31	28 February 2024	105	Tele2 Arena, Stockholm, Sweden	Bosnia and Herzegovina	2–0	5–0	2023–24 UEFA Nations League
32	25 October 2024	108	Stade Émile Mayrisch, Esch-sur-Alzette, Luxembourg	Luxembourg	3–0	4–0	UEFA Euro 2025 qualifying play-offs
33	29 October 2024	109	Gamla Ullevi, Gothenburg, Sweden	Luxembourg	5–0	8–0	UEFA Euro 2025 qualifying play-offs
34	3 December 2024	111	Tele2 Arena, Stockholm, Sweden	Serbia	3–0	6–0	UEFA Euro 2025 qualifying play-offs
35	3 December 2024	111	Tele2 Arena, Stockholm, Sweden	Serbia	4–0	6–0	UEFA Euro 2025 qualifying play-offs
36	3 June 2025	116	Strawberry Arena, Stockholm, Sweden	Denmark	1–0	6–1	2025 UEFA Nations League
37	3 June 2025	116	Strawberry Arena, Stockholm, Sweden	Denmark	4–1	6–1	2025 UEFA Nations League
38	3 June 2025	116	Strawberry Arena, Stockholm, Sweden	Denmark	5–1	6–1	2025 UEFA Nations League
39	26 June 2025	117	Ullevål, Oslo, Sweden	Norway	1–0	2–0	Friendly
40	8 July 2025	119	Allmend Stadion Luzern, Lucerne, Switzerland	Poland	1–0	3–0	UEFA Women's Euro 2025
41	12 July 2025	120	Stadion Letzigrund, Zurich, Switzerland	Germany	1–1	4–1	UEFA Women's Euro 2025
42	17 July 2025	121	Stadion Letzigrund, Zurich, Switzerland	England	2–0	2–2 (2–3 p)	UEFA Women's Euro 2025
43	28 November 2025	124	Stade Auguste-Delaune, Reims, France	France	1–1	1–2	2025 UEFA Women's Nations League Finals
44	18 April 2026	128	Strawberry Arena, Stockholm, Sweden	Serbia	1–0	1–0	2027 FIFA Women's World Cup qualification
45	9 October 2026	131	Darius and Girėnas Stadium, Kaunas, Lithuania	Lithuania	4–0	5–0	2027 FIFA Women's World Cup qualification play-offs
46	13 October 2026	132	Strawberry Arena, Stockholm, Sweden	Lithuania	2–0	10–0	2027 FIFA Women's World Cup qualification play-offs
47	13 October 2026	132	Strawberry Arena, Stockholm, Sweden	Lithuania	7–0	10–0	2027 FIFA Women's World Cup qualification play-offs

== Honours ==
Linköping

- Damallsvenskan: 2016
- Svenska Cupen: 2013–14, 2014–15

Kopparbergs/Göteborg FC

- Damallsvenskan: 2020
- Svenska Cupen: 2020–21

Arsenal

- FA Women's League Cup: 2022–23, 2023–24
- UEFA Women's Champions League: 2024–25
- FIFA Women's Champions Cup: 2026

Sweden U17

- UEFA Women's Under-17 Championship runner-up: 2013

Sweden U19

- UEFA Women's Under-19 Championship: 2015

Sweden

- Summer Olympics silver medal: 2016, 2020
- Algarve Cup: 2018
- FIFA Women's World Cup third place: 2019, 2023

Individual

- Division 3 Golden Boot: 2012
- SvFF Breakthrough Player of the Year: 2015
- UEFA Women's Under-19 Championship Golden Boot: 2015
- Damallsvenskan Golden Boot: 2021
- Arsenal Women's Player of the Month: March 2024
