= Elin Magnusson =

Swedish footballer (born 1982)

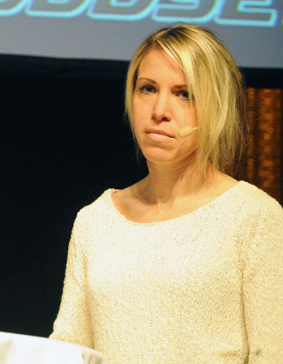

Personal information
- Full name: Elin Maria Magnusson
- Date of birth: 2 June 1982 (age 44)
- Place of birth: Örebro, Sweden
- Height: 1.73 m (5 ft 8 in)
- Position: Midfielder

Youth career
- Hallsbergs BK

Senior career*
Years	Team	Apps	(Gls)
1998	IFK Kumla		
1999–2015	KIF Örebro DFF	275	(29)

International career^{‡}
2013–2014	Sweden	1	(0)
- * Club domestic league appearances and goals as of 01:04, 17 February 2016 (UTC) ‡ National team caps and goals as of 01:04, 17 February 2016 (UTC)

Elin Maria Magnusson (born 2 June 1982) is a retired Swedish footballer. She played for KIF Örebro DFF and the Sweden women's national football team. A versatile player, who functioned as a central midfielder as well as a left back.

== Club career ==
Magnusson joined KIF Örebro in 1999 when they were known as Karlslunds IF. She remained loyal to the club and later became captain. After seventeen seasons at the club, 29 goals in 275 league matches and more than 400 matches in all competitions, she retired in November 2015.

== International career ==
Magnusson made her debut for the senior Sweden team, aged 31, in a 1–1 draw with Brazil on 19 June 2013. She had represented the national team at Under 17 and Under 19 level, then spent several years in the international wilderness. Coach Pia Sundhage named Magnusson in the Sweden squad for UEFA Women's Euro 2013.
