= Dalsjöfors GoIF =

Swedish football club

- Full name: Dalsjöfors GoIF
- Founded: 1980
- Ground: Borås Arena
- Capacity: 16,899

Dalsjöfors GoIF is a football club in Dalsjöfors, Sweden. They play in the highest level of women's football leagues in Sweden, the Damallsvenskan.

Dalsjöfors GoIF play their home games at Borås Arena Stadium in Borås, also home of IF Elfsborg of the men's Premier Division (Allsvenskan).

== 2011 squad ==
As of 20 September 2011

Note: Flags indicate national team as defined under FIFA eligibility rules; some limited exceptions apply. Players may hold more than one non-FIFA nationality.

No.	Pos.	Nation	Player
1	GK	SWE	Fia Löfdahl
2	DF	SWE	Elin Dahl-Örn
3	DF	SWE	Maria Andersson
4	DF	USA	Alex Singer
5	DF	CAN	Emily Zurrer
6	MF	SWE	Alexandra Larsson
7	DF	SWE	Anna Lindén
8	FW	SWE	Marlene Laggren
9	MF	SWE	Linda Westberg
10	MF	SWE	Klara Lindberg
11	FW	SWE	Jessica Jansson
12	MF	SWE	Ellen Larsson

No.	Pos.	Nation	Player
13	MF	SWE	Sara Back
14	MF	SWE	Malin Svenjeby
15	DF	SWE	Josefin Berg
16	FW	SWE	Emelie Johansson
17	FW	CAN	Melissa Tancredi
18	MF	SWE	Nanna Jansson
19	DF	SWE	Frida Persson
21	FW	SWE	Rebecca Johnson
22	FW	USA	India Trotter
25	GK	SWE	Elin Hallin
28	GK	CAN	Erin McLeod
30	GK	SWE	Sandra Bjurteg
