= Hammenhögs IF =

Swedish sports club

- Full name: Hammenhögs idrottsförening
- Sport: association football
- Founded: 1927
- Based in: Hammenhög, Sweden
- Ballpark: Hamondavallen

Hammenhögs IF is a sports club in Hammenhög, Sweden, established in 1927.

The women’s soccer team played four seasons in the Swedish top division between 1978 and 1981.
