= Sofia Skog =

Swedish footballer

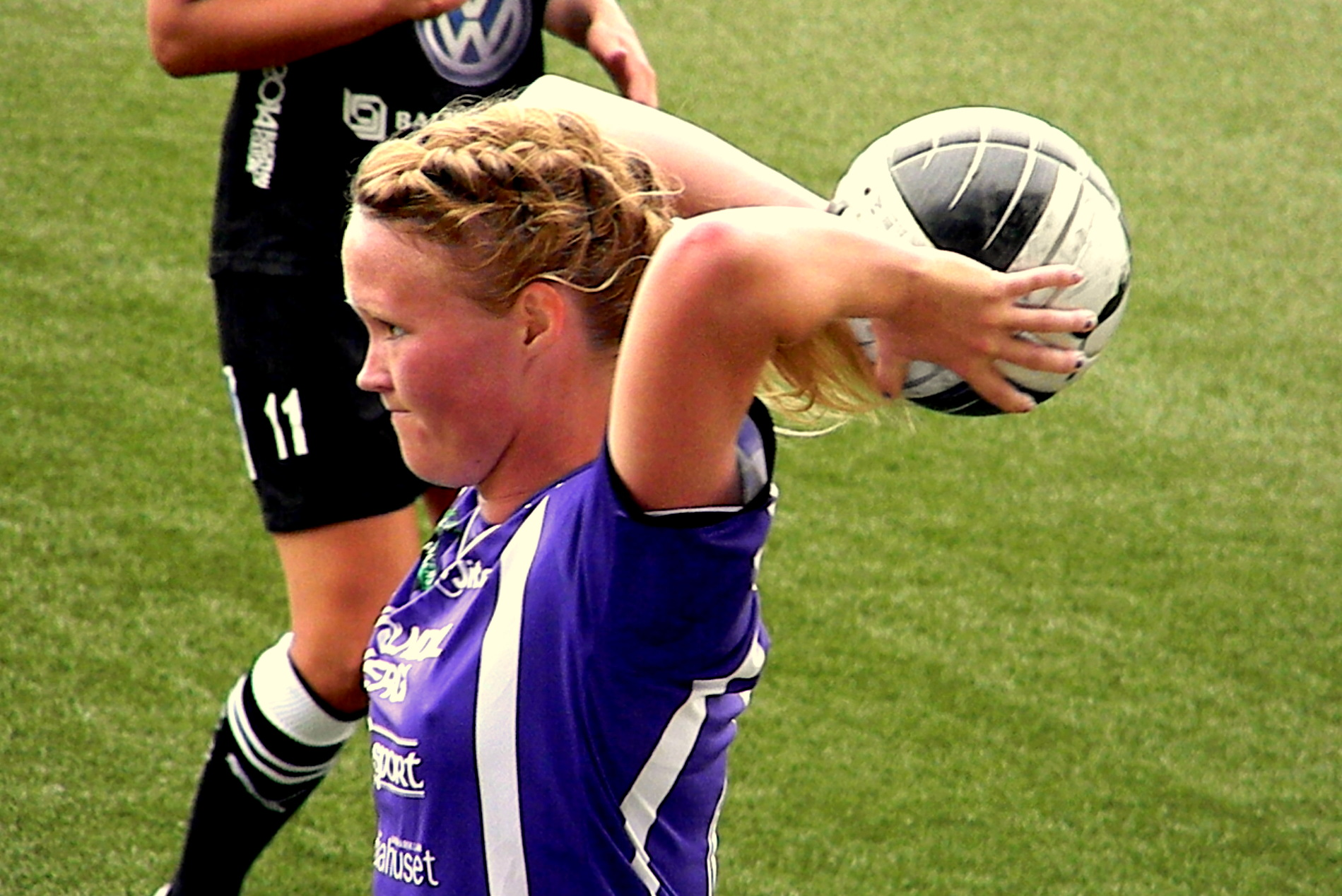

Personal information
- Date of birth: 1 October 1988 (age 38)
- Position: Midfielder

Senior career*
| Years | Team | Apps | (Gls) |
| 2010–2013 | Jitex BK | 76 | (4) |
| 2014–2015 | Kopparbergs/Göteborg FC | 30 | (4) |
- * Club domestic league appearances and goals as of 06:23, 17 February 2016 (UTC)

Sofia Skog (born 1 October 1988) is a Swedish footballer who last played for Kopparbergs/Göteborg FC in the fully professional Damallsvenskan, the top Swedish women's league, as a midfielder. Skog played for Jitex BK from 2010 to 2013, where she scored four goals in 76 appearances.
