= 2012 Svenska Supercupen (women) =

- Event: Svenska Supercupen
| LdB FC Malmö | Kopparbergs/Göteborg FC |
| 2 | 1 |
- Date: 25 March 2012
- Venue: Malmö IP, Malmö
- Referee: Pernilla Larsson (Trollhättan)
- Attendance: 311

Svenska Supercupen 2012, Swedish Super Cup 2012, was the 6th Svenska Supercupen for women, an annual football match contested by the winners of the previous season's Damallsvenskan and Svenska Cupen competitions. The match was played at Malmö IP, Malmö, on 25 March 2012, and was contested by league winners LdB FC Malmö and cup winners Kopparbergs/Göteborg FC. The match was Malmö's second consecutive appearance and Kopparbergs/Göteborg's first in Svenska Supercupen since its creation. Malmö won the match 2–1 and claimed their second consecutive title in the competition.

== Match facts ==
25 March 2012
17:00 (UTC+1)

| LdB FC Malmö | 2 – 1 | Kopparbergs/Göteborg FC |
|---|---|---|
| Bachmann 58'; Mittag 89' | Report | Ek 49' |

Malmö IP, Malmö
Attendance: 311
Referee: Pernilla Larsson (Trollhättan)

| LdB FC Malmö | Kopparbergs/Göteborg FC |
