= Svenska Supercupen (women) =

Swedish women's football tournament

- Founded: 2007
- Country: Sweden
- Number of clubs: 2
- Most championships: FC Rosengård (formerly LdB FC Malmö) (4 titles)
- Website: Svenska Supercupen

Svenska Supercupen was a single-match fixture in Swedish football played between the previous season's Damallsvenskan league champions and the winners of the Svenska Cupen. It was played before the start of the next Damallsvenskan season. The first final was played in 2007.

In 2014 no Supercup was held, as the Swedish Cup was restructured going from single years to being played summer to summer.

== Previous winners ==
Previous winners are:

In 2007 Umea won the league and the cup thus playing against league runners-up Djurgarden in the 2008 supercup.

Season	Winner	Result	Runner-up	Venue	Attendance
2007	Umeå IK^{Ch}	3–1; SvFF report	Linköpings FC^{Cw}	Idrottsparken, Norrköping	573
2008	Umeå IK^{Ch,}^{Cw}	3–0; SvFF report	Djurgårdens IF Dam	Gammliavallen, Umeå	377
2009	Linköpings FC^{Cw}	1–0; SvFF report	Umeå IK^{Ch}	Gammliavallen, Umeå	
2010	Linköpings FC^{Cw}	2–0; SvFF report	Umeå IK^{Ch}	Idrottsparken, Norrköping	
2011	LdB FC Malmö^{Ch}	2–1; SvFF report	KIF Örebro^{Cw}	Malmö IP, Malmö	354
2012	LdB FC Malmö^{Ch}	2–1; SvFF report	Kopparbergs/Göteborg FC^{Cw}	Malmö IP, Malmö	311
2013	Kopparbergs/Göteborg FC^{Cw}	2–2 a.e.t. (4–2 p); SvFF report	Tyresö FF^{Ch}	Tyresövallen, Tyresö	439
2015	Rosengård^{Ch}	1–0; SvFF report	Linköpings FC^{Cw}	Malmö IP, Malmö	
2016	Rosengård^{Ch}	2–1; SvFF report	Linköpings FC^{Cw}	Malmö IP, Malmö	

Ch League champion.
Cw Cup winner
